= 2017 World Junior Ice Hockey Championships =

Under-20 ice hockey championship held in Canada

2017 IIHF World Junior Championship

Tournament details
- Host country: Canada
- Cities: Montreal, Toronto
- Venue(s): Centre Bell; Air Canada Centre (in 2 host cities)
- Dates: December 26, 2016 – January 5, 2017
- Teams: 10

Final positions
- Champions: United States (4th title)
- Runners-up: Canada
- Third place: Russia
- Fourth place: Sweden

Tournament statistics
- Games played: 30
- Goals scored: 183 (6.1 per game)
- Attendance: 257,882 (8,596 per game)
- Scoring leader: (Russia) Kirill Kaprizov (12 points)

Awards
- MVP: (Canada) Thomas Chabot

Official website
- worldjunior2017.com

The 2017 World Junior Ice Hockey Championships was the 41st edition of the Ice Hockey World Junior Championship (WJC or WM20). The main tournament was co-hosted by the Bell Centre in Montreal, Quebec and Air Canada Centre in Toronto, Ontario. This was the 14th championship that Canada had hosted. Montreal and Toronto also jointly hosted the 2015 edition. The tournament consisted of 30 games between 10 nations.

Group A preliminary games, as well as the medal rounds, were hosted by the Bell Centre in Montreal. The Air Canada Centre in Toronto hosted preliminaries in Group B, including the host country of Canada. The tournament also initiated several year-long celebrations, the 375th anniversary of Montreal's founding; the 100th anniversary of the National Hockey League's founding in Montreal; the 100th anniversary of Hockey Canada's origins; the 50th anniversary of Montreal's Expo 67; the 150th anniversary of Canadian confederation; and the 100th anniversary of the Toronto Maple Leafs. The Maple Leafs had planned to make the WJHC the centrepiece of their 100th-anniversary celebrations.

The event was organized by Hockey Canada, Hockey Québec, Ontario Hockey Federation, Montreal Canadiens, Maple Leaf Sports & Entertainment and Evenko. Montreal and Quebec provided C$1 million and C$2 million in funding, respectively, for both the 2015 and 2017 editions.

For the first time in the history of the event, the defending champion (Finland) had to compete in the relegation round. Latvia was relegated to Division I-A for 2018 by merit of their tenth-place finish.

== Player eligibility ==
A player was eligible to play in the 2017 World Junior Ice Hockey Championships if:

- the player was of male gender;
- the player was born at the earliest in 1997, and at the latest, in 2002;
- the player was a citizen in the country he represented;
- the player was under the jurisdiction of a national association that was a member of the IIHF.

If a player who has never played in IIHF-organized competition wishes to switch national eligibility, he must have played in competitions for two consecutive years in the new country without playing in another country, as well as show his move to the new country's national association with an international transfer card. In case the player has previously played in IIHF-organized competition but wishes to switch national eligibility, he must have played in competitions for four consecutive years in the new country without playing in another country, he must show his move to the new country's national association with an international transfer card, as well as be a citizen of the new country. A player may only switch national eligibility once.

== Top Division ==
=== Venues ===
Montreal	2017 World Junior Ice Hockey Championships is located in Canada	Toronto
Bell Centre Capacity: 21,288	2017 World Junior Ice Hockey Championships is located in Canada	Air Canada Centre Capacity: 18,800

=== Match officials ===
The International Ice Hockey Federation selected 12 referees and 10 linesmen to officiate during the tournament:

Referees

- (Sweden) Tobias Björk
- (Canada) Darcy Burchell
- (Czech Republic) Jan Hribik
- (Slovakia) Jozef Kubus
- (United States) Mark Lemelin
- (Sweden) Marcus Linde
- (Germany) Marian Rohatsch
- (Finland) Anssi Salonen
- (United States) Brett Sheva
- (Belarus) Maxim Sidorenko
- (Czech Republic) Robin Šír
- (Switzerland) Daniel Stricker

Linesmen

- (Sweden) Jimmy Dahmen
- (United States) Jake Davis
- (Switzerland) Nicolas Fluri
- (Belarus) Dmitry Golyak
- (Denmark) Henrik Haurum
- (Germany) Lukas Kohlmuller
- (Russia) Yakov Paley
- (Czech Republic) Libor Suchanek
- (Finland) Sakari Suominen
- (Canada) Nathan Vanoosten

=== Format ===
The four best ranked teams from each group of the preliminary round advanced to the quarterfinals, while the last-placed team from both groups played a relegation round in a best-of-three format to determine the relegated team.

=== Preliminary round ===
All times are local. (Eastern Standard Time – UTC−5)

==== Group A ====
Pos	Team	Pld	W	OTW	OTL	L	GF	GA	GD	Pts	Qualification
1	Sweden	4	4	0	0	0	18	6	+12	12	Quarterfinals
2	Denmark	4	1	1	1	1	11	15	−4	6	Quarterfinals
3	Czech Republic	4	1	0	2	1	9	13	−4	5	Quarterfinals
4	Switzerland	4	0	2	0	2	11	13	−2	4	Quarterfinals
5	Finland	4	1	0	0	3	6	8	−2	3	Relegation round

Source: IIHF

26 December 2016; 13:00	Denmark	1–6 (0–2, 0–4, 1–0)	Sweden	Centre Bell, Montreal; Attendance: 4,518

Game reference

Lasse Petersen
Goalies
Felix Sandström
Referees:
(Germany) Marian Rohatsch
(Finland) Anssi Salonen
Linesmen:
(Switzerland) Nicolas Fluri
(Finland) Sakari Suominen

	0–1	10:11 – Nylander
	0–2	18:24 – Eriksson Ek (Dahlin, Kylington)
	0–3	24:30 – Dahlén (Grundström, L. Carlsson)
	0–4	26:26 – Grundström (SH)
	0–5	33:12 – Dahlin (G. Carlsson)
	0–6	38:22 – Nylander (Bernhardt, Eriksson Ek)
Krag Christensen (J. Røndbjerg) – 57:53	1–6

2 min
Penalties
6 min
22
Shots
33

26 December 2016; 17:00	Finland	1–2 (1–1, 0–0, 0–1)	Czech Republic	Centre Bell, Montreal; Attendance: 4,703

Game reference

Veini Vehviläinen
Goalies
Jakub Škarek
Referees:
(Sweden) Tobias Björk
(Switzerland) Daniel Stricker
Linesmen:
(Russia) Yakov Paley
(Canada) Nathan Vanoosten

	0–1	04:27 – Krenželok (Nečas)
Luoto – 08:46	1–1
	1–2	58:42 – Špaček (Musil, Zbořil)

4 min
Penalties
2 min
23
Shots
30

27 December 2016; 13:00	Czech Republic	3–4 OT (0–0, 0–2, 3–1) (OT: 0–1)	Switzerland	Centre Bell, Montreal; Attendance: 4,683

Game reference

Jakub Škarek
Goalies
Joren van Pottelberghe
Referees:
(United States) Mark Lemelin
(Finland) Anssi Salonen
Linesmen:
(Germany) Lukas Kohlmuller
(Finland) Sakari Suominen

	0–1	29:19 – In Albon (Hischier, Diem)
	0–2	36:03 – Thürkauf (Riat, Hischier) (PP)
Koblížek (Zbořil) – 45:02	1–2
	1–3	48:34 – Riat (Siegenthaler, Thurkauf) (PP)
Chlapík (Hronek, Špaček) (PP) – 50:41	2–3
Chlapík (Špaček, Zbořil) (EA) – 59:44	3–3
	3–4	60:23 – Hischier (Riat)

14 min
Penalties
8 min
39
Shots
22

27 December 2016; 17:30	Denmark	3–2 (2–0, 1–0, 0–2)	Finland	Centre Bell, Montreal; Attendance: 4,733

Game reference

Kasper Krog
Goalies
Veini Vehviläinen
Karolus Kaarlehto
Referees:
(Sweden) Tobias Björk
(Czech Republic) Robin Šír
Linesmen:
(Switzerland) Nicolas Fluri
(Canada) Nathan Vanoosten

Boysen (Weichel, True) (PP) – 05:20	1–0
Madsen (Jensen, Høeg) – 17:40	2–0
Blichfeld (J. Røndbjerg, Koch) – 35:53	3–0
	3–1	44:17 – Vaakanainen (Mattila, Väyrynen)
	3–2	55:30 – Björkqvist (Luoto, Mattila)

12 min
Penalties
10 min
10
Shots
36

28 December 2016; 17:00	Switzerland	2–4 (1–2, 1–0, 0–2)	Sweden	Centre Bell, Montreal; Attendance: 5,630

Game reference

Joren van Pottelberghe
Goalies
Felix Sandström
Referees:
(Germany) Marian Rohatsch
(Czech Republic) Robin Šír
Linesmen:
(Germany) Lukas Kohlmuller
(Russia) Yakov Paley

	0–1	04:13 – Eriksson Ek (Nylander, Bernhardt)
Siegenthaler (Riat, In Albon) (PP) – 05:08	1–1
	1–2	06:38 – Andersson (Grundström)
Thürkauf (Hischier, Siegenthaler) (PP) – 26:17	2–2
	2–3	54:52 – Eriksson Ek (Grundström, Nylander)
	2–4	57:11 – L. Carlsson (Asplund)

10 min
Penalties
14 min
15
Shots
46

29 December 2016; 13:00	Denmark	3–2 OT (0–1, 1–1, 1–0) (OT: 1–0)	Czech Republic	Centre Bell, Montreal; Attendance: 4,536

Game reference

Lasse Petersen
Goalies
Daniel Vladař
Referees:
(Sweden) Marcus Linde
(United States) Brett Sheva
Linesmen:
(Sweden) Jimmy Dahmen
(Russia) Yakov Paley

	0–1	07:56 – Nečas (Musil)
Blichfeld (Boysen, Larsen) (PP) – 28:41	1–1
	1–2	30:29 – Hronek (Suchý)
Krag Christensen (Blichfeld) – 53:36	2–2
From (Krag Christensen) – 60:47	3–2

8 min
Penalties
8 min
22
Shots
34

29 December 2016; 17:30	Finland	1–3 (1–0, 0–1, 0–2)	Sweden	Centre Bell, Montreal; Attendance: 9,062

Game reference

Veini Vehviläinen
Goalies
Felix Sandström
Referees:
(Czech Republic) Jan Hribik
(Slovakia) Jozef Kubus
Linesmen:
(United States) Jake Davis
(Denmark) Henrik Haurum

Räsänen (Tolvanen, Juolevi) (PP) – 16:35	1–0
	1–1	32:16 – Andersson (Nylander)
	1–2	41:24 – Nylander (Grundström, Eriksson Ek)
	1–3	59:00 – Nylander (ENG)

0 min
Penalties
8 min
29
Shots
20

30 December 2016; 17:00	Switzerland	5–4 GWS (1–3, 2–1, 1–0) (OT: 0–0) (SO: 1–0)	Denmark	Centre Bell, Montreal; Attendance: 6,006

Game reference

Joren van Pottelberghe
Goalies
Kasper Krog
Referees:
(Canada) Darcy Burchell
(Slovakia) Jozef Kubus
Linesmen:
(United States) Jake Davis
(Czech Republic) Suchanek Libor

	0–1	00:20 – True (Gatz)
	0–2	03:45 – Blichfeld (Krag Christensen, Gatz)
	0–3	13:40 – Andersen (From, Weichel) (PP)
Hischier (Riat, Siegenthaler) – 17:56	1–3
	1–4	20:28 – From (True, M. Røndbjerg)
Zehnder (Weber, Gross) – 26:29	2–4
Eggenberger (Prassl, Miranda) – 32:26	3–4
Zehnder (In-Albon, Siegenthaler) – 43:35	4–4

Miranda
Riat (miss)
Shootout
(miss) From
(miss) Blichfeld
(miss) True
6 min
Penalties
20 min
53
Shots
22

31 December 2016; 13:00	Sweden	5–2 (3–0, 1–0, 1–2)	Czech Republic	Centre Bell, Montreal; Attendance: 6,259

Game reference

Filip Gustavsson
Goalies
Daniel Vladař
Referees:
(United States) Brett Sheva
(Belarus) Maxim Sidorenko
Linesmen:
(Belarus) Dmitry Golyak
(Denmark) Henrik Haurum

Asplund (Ahl, Pettersson) – 00:37	1–0
Dahlén (Asplund, Nylander) (PP) – 08:56	2–0
Lööke (Karlström, Bernhardt) – 16:46	3–0
Dahlén (Karlström) – 37:09	4–0
Dahlén (Nylander, Kylington) (PP) – 43:34	5–0
	5–1	53:09 – Kaše (Kurovský)
	5–2	57:28 – Hronek (Kaše, Chlapík) (PP)

14 min
Penalties
10 min
37
Shots
38

31 December 2016; 17:30	Finland	2–0 (0–0, 2–0, 0–0)	Switzerland	Centre Bell, Montreal; Attendance: 4,013

Game reference
Veini Vehviläinen	Goalies	Joren van Pottelberghe	Referees: (Canada) Darcy Burchell (Sweden) Marcus Linde; Linesmen: (Sweden) Jimmy Dahmen (Czech Republic) Libor Suchanek
Räsänen (Vesalainen, Tolvanen) – 24:35 / 1–0; Tolvanen (Saarijärvi, Räsänen) (PP) – 33:53 / 2–0			Referees: (Canada) Darcy Burchell (Sweden) Marcus Linde; Linesmen: (Sweden) Jimmy Dahmen (Czech Republic) Libor Suchanek
2 min	Penalties	8 min	Referees: (Canada) Darcy Burchell (Sweden) Marcus Linde; Linesmen: (Sweden) Jimmy Dahmen (Czech Republic) Libor Suchanek
51	Shots	17	Referees: (Canada) Darcy Burchell (Sweden) Marcus Linde; Linesmen: (Sweden) Jimmy Dahmen (Czech Republic) Libor Suchanek

==== Group B ====
Pos	Team	Pld	W	OTW	OTL	L	GF	GA	GD	Pts	Qualification
1	United States	4	4	0	0	0	17	6	+11	12	Quarterfinals
2	Canada (H)	4	3	0	0	1	21	8	+13	9	Quarterfinals
3	Russia	4	2	0	0	2	16	9	+7	6	Quarterfinals
4	Slovakia	4	1	0	0	3	6	14	−8	3	Quarterfinals
5	Latvia	4	0	0	0	4	6	29	−23	0	Relegation round

Source: IIHF
(H) Host

26 December 2016; 15:30	United States	6–1 (1–1, 2–0, 3–0)	Latvia	Air Canada Centre, Toronto; Attendance: 7,014

Game reference

Tyler Parsons
Goalies
Mareks Mitens
Referees:
(Slovakia) Jozef Kubus
(Belarus) Maxim Sidorenko
Linesmen:
(Belarus) Dmitry Golyak
(Denmark) Henrik Haurum

Harper (Fitzgerald, Ahcan) – 06:27	1–0
	1–1	15:22 – Krastenbergs (E. Jansons)
White (Thompson, Fox) – 26:29	2–1
Keller (White, Thompson) – 38:45	3–1
Keller – 52:19	4–1
Bracco (Terry) (PP) – 57:41	5–1
Greenway (Kunin, Terry) – 59:20	6–1

14 min
Penalties
20 min
30
Shots
12

26 December 2016; 20:00	Canada	5–3 (1–1, 2–0, 2–2)	Russia	Air Canada Centre, Toronto; Attendance: 18,099

Game reference

Carter Hart
Goalies
Ilya Samsonov
Referees:
(Czech Republic) Jan Hribik
(Sweden) Marcus Linde
Linesmen:
(Sweden) Jimmy Dahmen
(United States) Jake Davis

Jost (Myers, Dubé) – 03:11	1–0
	1–1	09:47 – Sergachev (Gurianov)
Strome (Barzal, Chabot) (PP) – 33:15	2–1
Roy (Gauthier) – 37:08	3–1
Barzal (Dubois) (PP) – 43:03	4–1
	4–2	45:12 – Kaprizov (Vorobyev, Rykov) (PP)
Strome (Barzal) (PP) – 49:06	5–2
	5–3	50:36 – Rykov (Yurtaikin, Kaprizov)

6 min
Penalties
12 min
37
Shots
17

27 December 2016; 16:00	Latvia	1–9 (0–3, 1–3, 0–3)	Russia	Air Canada Centre, Toronto; Attendance: 6,789

Game reference

Gustavs Grigals
Denijs Romanovskis
Goalies
Vladislav Sukhachyov
Referees:
(Canada) Darcy Burchell
(Sweden) Marcus Linde
Linesmen:
(Sweden) Jimmy Dahmen
(Czech Republic) Libor Suchanek

	0–1	05:33 – Yurtaikin (Dronov)
	0–2	12:10 – Polunin (Kaprizov, Sidorov)
	0–3	17:39 – Karnaukhov (Guryanov, Kudako)
	0–4	20:56 – Kaprizov (Vorobyev, Polunin)
Balcers (Dzierkals) (PP) – 23:42	1–4
	1–5	24:21 – Polunin (Rykov, Vorobyov)
	1–6	25:04 – Belyayev (Yurtaikin, Alexeyev)
	1–7	46:07 – Kaprizov (Rykov, Vorobyov) (PP)
	1–8	49:28 – Trenin (Kaprizov, Polunin) (PP2)
	1–9	56:07 – Kaprizov (Rykov, Vorobyov) (PP)

18 min
Penalties
10 min
26
Shots
40

27 December 2016; 20:00	Canada	5–0 (0–0, 4–0, 1–0)	Slovakia	Air Canada Centre, Toronto; Attendance: 12,694

Game reference

Connor Ingram
Goalies
Adam Húska
Referees:
(Czech Republic) Jan Hribik
(United States) Brett Sheva
Linesmen:
(United States) Jake Davis
(Denmark) Henrik Haurum

Lauzon (Gauthier, Jost) – 25:30	1-0
Raddysh (Dubois, Chabot) (PP) – 30:57	2-0
Cirelli (Lauzon, Speers) – 32:37	3-0
Chabot (Barzal, Strome) (PP) – 36:25	4-0
McLeod (Cirelli, Dubé) – 42:59	5–0

4 min
Penalties
8 min
44
Shots
6

28 December 2016; 19:30	Slovakia	2–5 (1–2, 0–3, 1–0)	United States	Air Canada Centre, Toronto; Attendance: 8,391

Game reference

Matej Tomek
Goalies
Joseph Woll
Referees:
(Canada) Darcy Burchell
(Belarus) Maxim Sidorenko
Linesmen:
(Belarus) Dmitry Golyak
(Czech Republic) Libor Suchanek

	0–1	10:15 – Laczynski (Cecconi)
	0–2	17:00 – White (Keller, Jones)
Fehérváry (Sádecký, Pataky) (PP) – 18:08	1–2
	1–3	22:03 – Thompson (Roslovic, Bellows)
	1–4	28:39 – McAvoy (Roslovic, Cecconi)
	1–5	32:57 – Terry (Kunin, Fitzgerald) (PP)
Roman (Andrisik, Sádecký) – 59:23	2–5

22 min
Penalties
4 min
20
Shots
50

29 December 2016; 15:30	Russia	2–3 (1–1, 1–2, 0–0)	United States	Air Canada Centre, Toronto; Attendance: 13,759

Game reference

Ilya Samsonov
Goalies
Tyler Parsons
Referees:
(Finland) Anssi Salonen
(Switzerland) Daniel Stricker
Linesmen:
(Finland) Sakari Suominen
(Canada) Nathan Vanoosten

	0–1	04:14 – Keller (Anderson, Fitzgerald)
Urakov (Trenin, Zborovski) (SH) – 11:59	1–1
	1–2	24:03 – White (McAvoy, Keller) (PP)
	1–3	31:41 – Terry (Foley, Laczynski)
Kaprizov (Rykov, Vorobyev) (PP) – 37:17	2–3

10 min
Penalties
6 min
27
Shots
37

29 December 2016; 20:00	Latvia	2–10 (0–3, 1–5, 1–2)	Canada	Air Canada Centre, Toronto; Attendance: 13,796

Game reference

Mareks Mitens
Gustavs Grigals
Goalies
Carter Hart
Referees:
(Sweden) Tobias Björk
(United States) Mark Lemelin
Linesmen:
(Switzerland) Nicolas Fluri
(Belarus) Dmitry Golyak
(Canada) Nathan Vanoosten replaced Golyak during the game due to injury

	0–1	10:38 – Barzal (Myers) (SH)
	0–2	11:54 – Roy (Myers, Clague) (PP)
	0–3	19:40 – Raddysh (Chabot, Strome) (PP)
	0–4	29:11 – Raddysh (Strome, Dubois) (PP)
	0–5	32:13 – Raddysh (Joseph, Clague)
	0–6	32:53 – Barzal (Raddysh, Clague)
	0–7	33:30 – Cirelli (Dubé, Speers)
	0–8	34:56 – McLeod (Strome, Fabbro)
Krastenbergs (Tralmaks, E. Jansons) (SH) – 37:58	1–8
	1–9	42:07 – Raddysh (Juulsen, Joseph)
Dzierkals – 47:59	2–9
	2–10	58:05 – Gauthier (Dubois, Strome)

14 min
Penalties
20 min
25
Shots
35

30 December 2016; 19:30	Slovakia	4–2 (1–1, 1–0, 2–1)	Latvia	Air Canada Centre, Toronto; Attendance: 6,018

Game reference

Adam Húska
Goalies
Mareks Mitens
Gustavs Grigals
Referees:
(United States) Mark Lemelin
(Germany) Marian Rohatsch
Linesmen:
(Germany) Lukas Kohlmuller
(Finland) Sakari Suominen

	0–1	03:40 – Cukste (Balcers, Buncis)
Lestan – 08:13	1–1
Mi Roman (Mich Roman, Sloboda) – 38:11	2–1
Hatala (Mich Roman, Sádecký) – 40:41	3–1
Sloboda (Mi Roman, Grman) – 45:01	4–1
	4–2	53:29 – Buncis (Cukste, Dzierkals) (PP)

12 min
Penalties
10 min
36
Shots
24

31 December 2016; 15:30	United States	3–1 (2–0, 1–1, 0–0)	Canada	Air Canada Centre, Toronto; Attendance: 18,584

Game reference

Joseph Woll
Goalies
Connor Ingram
Referees:
(Finland) Anssi Salonen
(Switzerland) Daniel Stricker
Linesmen:
(Switzerland) Nicolas Fluri
(Russia) Yakov Paley

White (Greenway, Keller) (PP) – 04:31	1–0
Greenway (Keller, McAvoy) (PP) – 06:04	2–0
	2–1	28:12 – Chabot (Barzal, Strome) (PP2)
Bracco (Lindgren, Greenway) – 33:08	3–1

37 min
Penalties
16 min
20
Shots
26

31 December 2016; 20:00	Russia	2–0 (0–0, 1–0, 1–0)	Slovakia	Air Canada Centre, Toronto; Attendance: 5,269

Game reference
Ilya Samsonov	Goalies	Matej Tomek	Referees: (Germany) Marian Rohatsch (Czech Republic) Robin Šír; Linesmen: (Germany) Lukas Kohlmuller (Canada) Nathan Vanoosten
Guryanov (Kvartalnov, Karnaukhov) (PP) – 29:06 / 1–0; Trenin (Urakov, Belyayev) – 49:39 / 2–0			Referees: (Germany) Marian Rohatsch (Czech Republic) Robin Šír; Linesmen: (Germany) Lukas Kohlmuller (Canada) Nathan Vanoosten
4 min	Penalties	6 min	Referees: (Germany) Marian Rohatsch (Czech Republic) Robin Šír; Linesmen: (Germany) Lukas Kohlmuller (Canada) Nathan Vanoosten
30	Shots	15	Referees: (Germany) Marian Rohatsch (Czech Republic) Robin Šír; Linesmen: (Germany) Lukas Kohlmuller (Canada) Nathan Vanoosten

=== Relegation round ===
2 January 2017; 11:00	Finland	2–1 (1–0, 0–1, 1–0)	Latvia	Centre Bell, Montreal; Attendance: 3,016

Game reference

Veini Vehviläinen
Goalies
Mareks Mitens
Referees:
(United States) Brett Sheva
(Belarus) Maxim Sikorenko
Linesmen:
(Belarus) Dmitry Golyak
(Denmark) Henrik Haurum

Saarijärvi (Räsänen) (PP) – 07:43	1–0
	1–1	24:37 – Ponomarenko (Krastenbergs, Tralmaks)
Vesalainen (Heiskanen, Tolvanen) – 49:00	2–1

10 min
Penalties
12 min
45
Shots
24

3 January 2017; 17:30	Latvia	1–4 (1–1, 0–0, 0–3)	Finland	Centre Bell, Montreal; Attendance: 4,216

Game reference

Mareks Mitens
Goalies
Veini Vehviläinen
Referees:
(Czech Republic) Jan Hribik
(Czech Republic) Robin Šir
Linesmen:
(United States) Jake Davis
(Russia) Yakov Paley

	0–1	01:31 – Tolvanen (Räsänen, Nättinen) (PP2)
Krastenbergs (Čukste, Ponomarenko) (PP) – 16:23	1–1
	1–2	41:28 – Saarijärvi (Tolvanen, Juolevi) (PP)
	1–3	42:33 – Välimäki (Björkqvist, Kuokkanen)
	1–4	57:26 – Välimäki (Räsänen, Saarijärvi) (PP2)

49 min
Penalties
16 min
23
Shots
42

Note: Latvia was relegated to the 2018 Division I A

=== Playoff round ===
Quarterfinals
1A	Sweden	8
4B	Slovakia	3
2B	Canada	5
3A	Czech Republic	3
2A	Denmark	0
3B	Russia	4
1B	United States	3
4A	Switzerland	2

Semifinals
1A	Sweden	2
2B	Canada	5
3B	Russia	3
1B	United States (GWS)	4

Final
2B	Canada	4
1B	United States (GWS)	5
Bronze medal game
1A	Sweden	1
3B	Russia (OT)	2

==== Quarterfinals ====
2 January 2017; 13:00	Denmark	0–4 (0–2, 0–0, 0–2)	Russia	Air Canada Centre, Toronto; Attendance: 7,801

Game reference

Lasse Petersen
Kasper Krog
Goalies
Ilya Samsonov
Referees:
(United States) Mark Lemelin
(Germany) Marian Rohatsch
Linesmen:
(Germany) Lukas Kohlmuller
(Finland) Sakari Suominen

0–1	08:45 – Polunin (Vorobyev)
0–2	19:49 – Kaprizov (Vorobyev, Trenin) (PP)
0–3	47:12 – Karnaukhov (Guryanov, Kvartalnov)
0–4	55:35 – Kaprizov (Polunin)

10 min
Penalties
14 min
14
Shots
32

2 January 2017; 15:30	Sweden	8–3 (3–0, 2–2, 3–1)	Slovakia	Centre Bell, Montreal; Attendance: 6,331

Game reference

Felix Sandström
Goalies
Adam Húska
Referees:
(Canada) Darcy Burchell
(Czech Republic) Jan Hribik
Linesmen:
(United States) Jake Davis
(Czech Republic) Libor Suchanek

Eriksson Ek (Asplund, Karlström) (PP) – 01:18	1–0
Söderlund (Wingerli, Gunnarsson) – 16:28	2–0
Grundström (Nylander, L. Carlsson) – 17:01	3–0
Nylander (Dahlén, Asplund) – 26:17	4–0
Karlström (Ahl, Asplund) – 33:07	5–0
	5–1	35:48 – Bodák (Sloboda) (PP)
	5–2	36:54 – Struska (Černák)
	5–3	41:53 – Ružička
Söderlund (G. Carlsson) – 42:36	6–3
Andersson (Larsson, Lööke) (PP) – 44:27	7–3
Eriksson Ek (Asplund, Kylington) (PP) – 57:04	8–3

2 min
Penalties
20 min
50
Shots
18

2 January 2017; 17:30	United States	3–2 (2–0, 0–1, 1–1)	Switzerland	Air Canada Centre, Toronto; Attendance: 8,176

Game reference

Tyler Parsons
Goalies
Joren van Pottelberghe
Referees:
(Sweden) Tobias Björk
(Czech Republic) Robin Šír
Linesmen:
(Russia) Yakov Paley
(Canada) Nathan Vanoosten

Bracco (Thompson, Terry) (PP) – 08:32	1–0
Kunin (Greenway, Bracco) – 10:42	2–0
	2–1	30:47 – Hischier (Siegenthaler, Riat) (PP)
	2–2	46:00 – Hischier (Thürkauf) (PP)
Greenway (McAvoy, Keller) (PP) – 46:18	3–2

10 min
Penalties
18 min
17
Shots
21

2 January 2017; 20:00	Canada	5–3 (0–1, 3–1, 2–1)	Czech Republic	Centre Bell, Montreal; Attendance: 10,215

Game reference

Connor Ingram
Goalies
Jakub Škarek
Referees:
(Slovakia) Jozef Kubus
(Sweden) Marcus Linde
Linesmen:
(Sweden) Jimmy Dahmen
(Switzerland) Nicolas Fluri

	0–1	16:49 – Kaše (Musil, Hronek)
Speers (Stephens, Joseph) – 23:45	1–1
Stephens (Cirelli) – 27:27	2–1
	2–2	28:53 – Šoustal
Chabot (Stephens, Cirelli) – 33:32	3–2
Gauthier (Roy) – 43:18	4–2
	4–3	45:54 – Stransky (Nečas)
Gauthier (Barzal, Chabot) – 46:37	5–3

4 min
Penalties
8 min
41
Shots
19

==== Semifinals ====
4 January 2017; 15:00	United States	4–3 GWS (1–1, 2–1, 0–1) (OT: 0–0) (SO: 4–3)	Russia	Centre Bell, Montreal; Attendance: 11,576

Game reference

Tyler Parsons
Goalies
Ilya Samsonov
Referees:
(Canada) Darcy Burchell
(Sweden) Marcus Linde
Linesmen:
(Germany) Lukas Kohlmuller
(Czech Republic) Libor Suchanek

	0–1	11:54 – Kaprizov (Vorobyev)
White (Keller, Jones) – 19:05	1–1
	1–2	21:17 – Guryanov (Kudako, Karnaukhov)
Kunin (Greenway, Bracco) (PP) – 30:23	2–2
White (Anderson, Keller) – 36:21	3–2
	3–3	46:04 – Guryanov

White (miss)
Keller (miss)
Anderson (miss)
Terry
Bracco
Terry
Terry
Shootout
Guryanov
(miss) Polunin
(miss) Alexeyev
Vorobyev
(miss) Kaprizov
Guryanov
(miss) Polunin
2 min
Penalties
8 min
44
Shots
36

4 January 2017; 19:30	Sweden	2–5 (2–2, 0–1, 0–2)	Canada	Centre Bell, Montreal; Attendance: 13,456

Game reference

Felix Sandström
Goalies
Connor Ingram
Carter Hart

Eriksson Ek (Söderlund) (SH) – 6:05	1–0
	1–1	7:43 – Stephens (Cirelli)
Grundström (Nylander, Eriksson Ek) – 8:05	2–1
	2–2	18:49 – Cirelli (Clague, Chabot)
	2–3	32:02 – Gauthier (Dubois)
	2–4	47:38 – Strome (Juulsen, Bean)
	2–5	58:02 – Gauthier (Strome, Jost) (ENG)

12 min
Penalties
8 min
31
Shots
43

==== Bronze medal game ====
5 January 2017; 15:30	Sweden	1–2 OT (0–0, 1–1, 0–0) (OT: 0–1)	Russia (bronze)	Centre Bell, Montreal; Attendance: 8,366

Game reference

Felix Sandström
Goalies
Ilya Samsonov
Referees:
(Canada) Darcy Burchell
(Slovakia) Jozef Kubus
Linesmen:
(Finland) Sakari Suominen
(Canada) Nathan Vanoosten

	0–1	20:16 – Kaprizov (Vorobyev, Rykov)
Dahlén – 30:11	1–1
	1–2	60:33 – Guryanov

4 min
Penalties
6 min
39
Shots
26

==== Final ====
5 January 2017; 20:00	(gold) United States	5–4 GWS (0–2, 2–0, 2–2) (OT: 0–0) (SO: 1–0)	Canada (silver)	Centre Bell, Montreal; Attendance: 20,173

Game reference

Tyler Parsons
Goalies
Carter Hart
Referees:
(Finland) Anssi Salonen
(Switzerland) Daniel Stricker
Linesmen:
(Sweden) Jimmy Dahmén
(Switzerland) Nicolas Fluri

	0–1	4:58 – Chabot (Barzal, Joseph)
	0–2	9:02 – Lauzon (Stephens)
McAvoy (Greenway, Fox) – 23:04	1–2
Bellows (Fox, Thompson) (PP) – 29:30	2–2
	2–3	41:52 – Roy (Bean, Jost) (PP)
	2–4	44:05 – Joseph (McLeod, Chabot)
Bellows (McAvoy) – 44:44	3–4
White (Fox, Keller) – 47:07	4–4

White (miss)
Keller (miss)
Bellows (miss)
Terry
Bracco (miss)
Shootout
(miss) Strome
(miss) Barzal
(miss) Jost
(miss) Cirelli
(miss) Roy
12 min
Penalties
4 min
36
Shots
50

=== Statistics ===
==== Scoring leaders ====
Pos	Player	Country	GP	G	A	Pts	+/−	PIM
1	Kirill Kaprizov	Russia	7	9	3	12	+7	2
2	Alexander Nylander	Sweden	7	5	7	12	+7	0
3	Clayton Keller	United States	7	3	8	11	+3	2
4	Thomas Chabot	Canada	7	4	6	10	+4	8
5	Dylan Strome	Canada	7	3	7	10	+1	0
6	Mikhail Vorobyev	Russia	7	0	10	10	+6	4
7	Joel Eriksson Ek	Sweden	7	6	3	9	+8	4
8	Colin White	United States	7	7	1	8	+5	4
9	Mathew Barzal	Canada	7	3	5	8	+4	4
9	Jordan Greenway	United States	7	3	5	8	+3	2

GP = Games played; G = Goals; A = Assists; Pts = Points; +/− = Plus–minus; PIM = Penalties in minutes
Source: IIHF

==== Goaltending leaders ====
(minimum 40% team's total ice time)

Pos	Player	Country	TOI	GA	GAA	Sv%	SO
1	Veini Vehviläinen	Finland	317:57	8	1.51	93.10	1
2	Ilya Samsonov	Russia	370:11	13	2.11	92.97	2
3	Kasper Krog	Denmark	165:00	9	3.27	91.96	0
4	Tyler Parsons	United States	330:00	12	2.18	91.67	0
5	Felix Sandström	Sweden	359:50	13	2.17	91.45	0

TOI = Time On Ice (minutes:seconds); GA = Goals against; GAA = Goals against average; Sv% = Save percentage; SO = Shutouts
Source: IIHF

=== Tournament awards ===
Reference: Most Valuable Player

- Defenceman: (Canada) Thomas Chabot

All-star team

- Goaltender: (Russia) Ilya Samsonov
- Defencemen: (Canada) Thomas Chabot, (United States) Charlie McAvoy
- Forwards: (Russia) Kirill Kaprizov, (Sweden) Alexander Nylander, (United States) Clayton Keller

IIHF best player awards

- Goaltender: (Sweden) Felix Sandström
- Defenceman: (Canada) Thomas Chabot
- Forward: (Russia) Kirill Kaprizov

=== Final standings ===
Pos	Grp	Team	Pld	W	OTW	OTL	L	GF	GA	GD	Pts	Final result
1	B	United States	7	5	2	0	0	29	15	+14	19	Champions
2	B	Canada (H)	7	5	0	1	1	35	18	+17	16	Runners-up
3	B	Russia	7	3	1	1	2	25	14	+11	12	Third place
4	A	Sweden	7	5	0	1	1	29	16	+13	16	Fourth place
5	A	Denmark	5	1	1	1	2	11	19	−8	6	Eliminated in Quarter-finals
6	A	Czech Republic	5	1	0	2	2	12	18	−6	5	Eliminated in Quarter-finals
7	A	Switzerland	5	0	2	0	3	13	16	−3	4	Eliminated in Quarter-finals
8	B	Slovakia	5	1	0	0	4	9	22	−13	3	Eliminated in Quarter-finals
9	A	Finland	6	3	0	0	3	12	10	+2	9	Advanced in Relegation round
10	B	Latvia	6	0	0	0	6	8	35	−27	0	Relegated to the 2018 Division I A

Source: IIHF
(H) Host

== Division I ==
=== Group A ===
The Division I A tournament was held in Bremerhaven, Germany, from December 11 to 17, 2016.

Pos	Team	Pld	W	OTW	OTL	L	GF	GA	GD	Pts	Promotion or relegation
1	Belarus	5	4	0	1	0	20	10	+10	13	Promoted to the 2018 Top Division
2	Germany (H)	5	3	1	0	1	17	13	+4	11	
3	France	5	2	0	0	3	16	19	−3	6 (Note: In head-to-head games, France had 6 Pts, Kazakhstan had 3 Pts, and Austria 0 Pts.)	
4	Kazakhstan	5	2	0	0	3	14	16	−2	6	
5	Austria	5	2	0	0	3	15	17	−2	6	
6	Norway	5	1	0	0	4	10	17	−7	3	Relegated to the 2018 Division I B

Source: IIHF
Rules for classification: 1) points; 2) head-to-head points; 3) head-to-head goal difference; 4) head-to-head number of goals scored; 5) result against closest best-ranked team outside tied teams; 6) result against second-best-ranked team outside tied teams; 7) seeding before tournament.
(H) Host

=== Group B ===
The Division I B tournament was held in Budapest, Hungary, from December 11 to 17, 2016. The hosts, entering as the bottom seed, won promotion for the second year in a row.

Pos	Team	Pld	W	OTW	OTL	L	GF	GA	GD	Pts	Promotion or relegation
1	Hungary (H)	5	4	0	0	1	21	12	+9	12	Promoted to the 2018 Division I A
2	Poland	5	3	1	0	1	21	16	+5	11	
3	Slovenia	5	2	1	0	2	21	13	+8	8	
4	Italy	5	2	0	1	2	12	19	−7	7	
5	Ukraine	5	1	1	0	3	9	13	−4	5	
6	Great Britain	5	0	0	2	3	8	19	−11	2	Relegated to the 2018 Division II A

Source: IIHF
Rules for classification: 1) points; 2) head-to-head points; 3) head-to-head goal difference; 4) head-to-head number of goals scored; 5) result against closest best-ranked team outside tied teams; 6) result against second-best ranked team outside tied teams; 7) seeding before tournament.
(H) Host

== Division II ==
=== Group A ===
The Division II A tournament was held in Tallinn, Estonia, from December 11 to 17, 2016.

Pos	Team	Pld	W	OTW	OTL	L	GF	GA	GD	Pts	Promotion or relegation
1	Lithuania	5	5	0	0	0	42	10	+32	15	Promoted to the 2018 Division I B
2	Japan	5	4	0	0	1	35	13	+22	12	
3	Romania	5	2	0	1	2	21	29	−8	7	
4	Estonia (H)	5	2	0	0	3	18	24	−6	6	
5	Netherlands	5	1	0	0	4	9	24	−15	3	
6	Croatia	5	0	1	0	4	11	36	−25	2	Relegated to the 2018 Division II B

Source: IIHF
Rules for classification: 1) points; 2) head-to-head points; 3) head-to-head goal difference; 4) head-to-head number of goals scored; 5) result against closest best-ranked team outside tied teams; 6) result against second-best ranked team outside tied teams; 7) seeding before tournament.
(H) Host

=== Group B ===
The Division II B tournament was held in Logroño, Spain, from January 7 to 13, 2017.

Pos	Team	Pld	W	OTW	OTL	L	GF	GA	GD	Pts	Promotion or relegation
1	South Korea	5	4	1	0	0	27	7	+20	14	Promoted to the 2018 Division II A
2	Spain (H)	5	4	0	0	1	38	12	+26	12	
3	Serbia	5	3	0	1	1	23	12	+11	10	
4	Belgium	5	2	0	0	3	15	19	−4	6	
5	Mexico	5	0	1	0	4	13	39	−26	2	
6	Australia	5	0	0	1	4	9	36	−27	1	Relegated to the 2018 Division III

Source: IIHF
Rules for classification: 1) points; 2) head-to-head points; 3) head-to-head goal difference; 4) head-to-head number of goals scored; 5) result against closest best-ranked team outside tied teams; 6) result against second-best ranked team outside tied teams; 7) seeding before tournament.
(H) Host

== Division III ==
The Division III tournament was held in Dunedin, New Zealand, from January 16 to 22, 2017. Turkey defeated China to achieve promotion to Division II. Chinese Taipei returned to play for the first time since 2011, losing all but their final game.

=== Group ===
Rank	Team	Result
1	Turkey	Promoted to the 2018 Division II B
2	China	
3	Iceland	
4	New Zealand	
5	Israel	
6	Bulgaria	
7	Chinese Taipei	Relegated to the 2018 Division III Qualification
8	South Africa	Relegated to the 2018 Division III Qualification

== See also ==
- 2015 World Junior Ice Hockey Championship when Toronto & Montreal co-hosted
- 2012 World Junior Ice Hockey Championships when Calgary & Edmonton co-hosted
- 2010 World Junior Ice Hockey Championships when Saskatoon & Regina co-hosted
- 2009 World Junior Ice Hockey Championships when Ottawa hosted
