= Andrej Hatala =

Slovak ice hockey defenceman

- Born: February 26, 1997 (age 28); Trenčín, Slovakia
- Height: 6 ft 0 in (183 cm)
- Weight: 187 lb (85 kg; 13 st 5 lb)
- Position: Defence
- Shoots: Right
- Slovak team Former teams: HK Dukla Trenčín; HC Nové Zámky; MsHK Žilina; HKM Zvolen
- Playing career: 2014–present

Andrej Hatala (born February 26, 1997) is a Slovak professional ice hockey defenceman playing for HK Dukla Trenčín of the Slovak Extraliga.

Hatala began his career with his hometown team HK Dukla Trenčín and made his debut for the team during the 2013–14 season. He remained with the team until 2017 when he moved to MsHK Žilina. He played for the team for just a single season before joining HC Nové Zámky on June 17, 2018. On June 29, 2020, Hatala joined HKM Zvolen.

Hatala represented Slovakia in the 2015 IIHF World U18 Championships and the 2017 World Junior Ice Hockey Championships.

== Career statistics ==
=== Regular season and playoffs ===
			Regular season					Playoffs
Season	Team	League	GP	G	A	Pts	PIM	GP	G	A	Pts	PIM

=== International ===
Year	Team	Event	Result	GP	G	A	Pts	PIM
2015	Slovakia	WJC18	7th	5	0	0	0	2
2017	Slovakia	WJC	8th	5	1	0	1	6
Junior totals				10	1	0	1	8

== Awards and honors ==
Award	Year
Slovak
Champion	2021
