= Grigori Dronov =

Russian ice hockey player (born 1998)

- Born: 10 January 1998 (age 28) Magnitogorsk, Russia
- Height: 6 ft 3 in (191 cm)
- Weight: 201 lb (91 kg; 14 st 5 lb)
- Position: Defence
- Shoots: Left
- KHL team Former teams: Traktor Chelyabinsk; Metallurg Magnitogorsk
- National team: Russia
- Playing career: 2016–present

Grigori Dronov (Russian: Григорий Антонович Дронов; born 10 January 1998) is a Russian professional ice hockey defenceman currently playing with Traktor Chelyabinsk of the Kontinental Hockey League (KHL).

== Playing career ==
Dronov originally played as a youth within Metallurg Magnitogorsk junior program before making his professional debut with Metallurg Magnitogorsk in the Kontinental Hockey League (KHL) during the 2016–17 season.

In his sixth season in the KHL with Magnitogorsk, after being limited to just 6 regular season games, Dronov broke out in the playoffs, placing second in league scoring amongst defenseman with 14 points to help Metallurg advance to the Gagarin Cup finals.

As a free agent, Dronov opted to pursue his NHL ambitions. After originally reporting to accept an invitation to the Arizona Coyotes training camp, Dronov later agreed to a tryout with the Carolina Hurricanes, appearing in a prospects showcase before participating in the Hurricanes' training camp. Following positive reviews through training camp and pre-season, Dronov was signed to a one-year, two-way contract with the Hurricanes and was immediately assigned to join AHL affiliate, the Chicago Wolves, on 4 October 2022. However, before his contract was officially lodged with the NHL, the Hurricanes announced they had mutually agreed to part ways on 6 October 2022.

Dronov returned to Russia and resumed his tenure with Metallurg Magnitogorsk, signing a one-year contract for the remainder of the 2022–23 season on 15 October 2022.

== Career statistics ==
=== Regular season and playoffs ===
			Regular season					Playoffs
Season	Team	League	GP	G	A	Pts	PIM	GP	G	A	Pts	PIM
2015–16	Stalnye Lisy	MHL	36	4	8	12	34	8	0	0	0	10
2016–17	Metallurg Magnitogorsk	KHL	38	0	2	2	12	14	0	1	1	2
2016–17	Stalnye Lisy	MHL	4	1	0	1	4	—	—	—	—	—
2017–18	Metallurg Magnitogorsk	KHL	25	2	5	7	4	9	0	1	1	6
2018–19	Metallurg Magnitogorsk	KHL	16	2	3	5	18	4	0	1	1	2
2018–19	Stalnye Lisy	MHL	1	0	0	0	0	—	—	—	—	—
2019–20	Metallurg Magnitogorsk	KHL	62	1	9	10	21	5	0	0	0	0
2020–21	Metallurg Magnitogorsk	KHL	42	2	12	14	10	12	1	3	4	4
2021–22	Metallurg Magnitogorsk	KHL	6	0	1	1	0	24	5	9	14	6
2022–23	Metallurg Magnitogorsk	KHL	41	8	11	19	24	11	4	2	6	10
2023–24	Metallurg Magnitogorsk	KHL	28	3	5	8	18	—	—	—	—	—
2023–24	Traktor Chelyabinsk	KHL	23	0	6	6	8	14	1	2	3	4
2024–25	Traktor Chelyabinsk	KHL	60	14	17	31	22	20	5	7	12	6
2025–26	Traktor Chelyabinsk	KHL	57	14	26	40	64	—	—	—	—	—
KHL totals			398	46	97	143	201	113	16	26	42	40

Medal record

Representing Russia

Ice hockey

World Junior Championships
Bronze medal – third place	2017 Canada	

=== International ===
Year	Team	Event	Result	GP	G	A	Pts	PIM
2017	Russia	WJC	3rd place, bronze medalist(s)	7	0	1	1	2
2021	ROC	WC	5th	5	0	0	0	0
Junior totals				7	0	1	1	2
Senior totals				5	0	0	0	0
