= Michal Roman =

Ice hockey player (1997-)

- Born: December 15, 1997 (age 28) Kysucké Nové Mesto, Slovakia
- Height: 6 ft 0 in (183 cm)
- Weight: 163 lb (74 kg; 11 st 9 lb)
- Position: Defence
- Shoots: Left
- Slovak team Former teams: HC Nové Zámky; HC Oceláři Třinec; MsHK Žilina; HKM Zvolen; HC Prešov; MHk 32 Liptovský Mikuláš; HC '05 Banská Bystrica
- Playing career: 2015–present

Michal Roman (born December 15, 1997) is a Slovak professional ice hockey player. He is currently playing for HC Nové Zámky of the Slovak Extraliga.

Roman made his Czech Extraliga debut playing with HC Oceláři Třinec during the 2015-16 Czech Extraliga season.

== Career statistics ==
=== Regular season and playoffs ===
			Regular season					Playoffs
Season	Team	League	GP	G	A	Pts	PIM	GP	G	A	Pts	PIM

=== International ===
Year	Team	Event	Result	GP	G	A	Pts	PIM
2015	Slovakia	WJC18	7th	5	0	0	0	2
2017	Slovakia	WJC	8th	5	1	2	3	2
Junior totals				10	1	2	3	4
