= Thomas Chabot =

Canadian ice hockey player (born 1997)

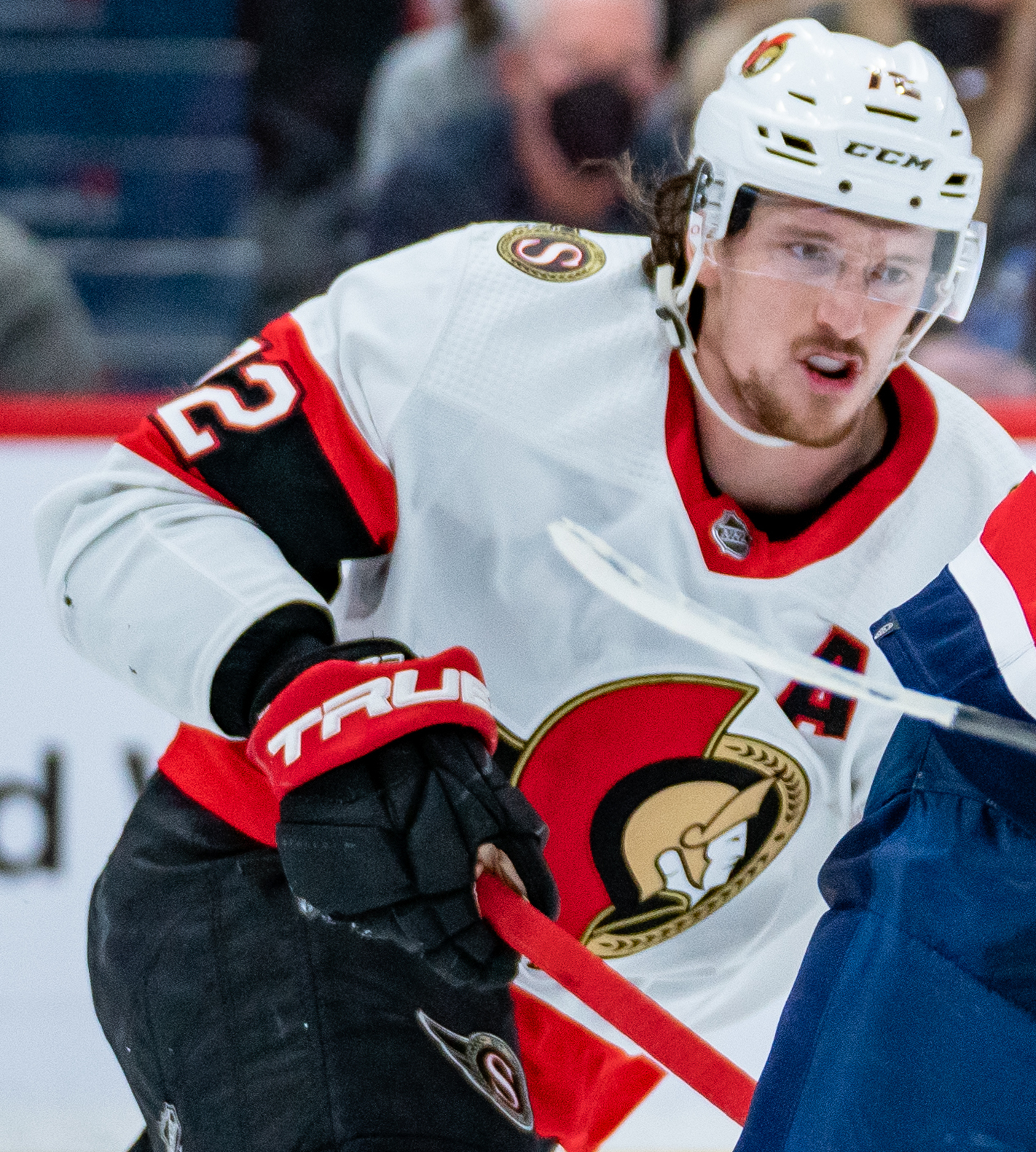
- Chabot with the Ottawa Senators in 2022
- Born: January 30, 1997 (age 29) Sainte-Marie, Quebec, Canada
- Height: 6 ft 1 in (185 cm)
- Weight: 200 lb (91 kg; 14 st 4 lb)
- Position: Defence
- Shoots: Left
- NHL team: Ottawa Senators
- National team: Canada
- NHL draft: 18th overall, 2015; Ottawa Senators
- Playing career: 2016–present

Thomas Chabot (/ʃəˈbɒt/ shə-BOT; born January 30, 1997) is a Canadian professional ice hockey player who is a defenceman and captain for the Ottawa Senators of the National Hockey League (NHL). Chabot was drafted in the first round (18th overall) by the Senators in the 2015 NHL entry draft. He won a silver medal at the World Junior Championships in January 2017, becoming the first defenceman to be named the most valuable player in the history of the tournament. He also won two silver medals at the IIHF World Championships in 2019 and 2022.

== Early life ==
Chabot was born in Sainte-Marie-de-Beauce to Francois, an elementary-school teacher and Claude, a hairdresser. His older brother Felix-Antoine, scored two goals in his only QMHL game. Chabot began skating at three years old. He played in the 2009 and 2010 Quebec International Pee-Wee Hockey Tournaments with his minor ice hockey team from the Beauce-Nord area.

== Playing career ==
=== Amateur ===
Chabot was selected by the Saint John Sea Dogs of the Quebec Major Junior Hockey League (QMJHL) in the second round, 22nd overall, of the 2013 QMJHL entry draft. In his rookie season in 2013–14, he appeared in 55 games with the Sea Dogs, scoring one goal and 21 assists for 22 points. The following season his outstanding play was rewarded when he was selected to play in the 2015 CHL/NHL Top Prospects Game. He led the team's defence in scoring with 12 goals and 41 points in 66 games, and finished fifth overall on the team. The Sea Dogs qualified for the playoffs but were eliminated by the Baie-Comeau Drakkar in the opening round. He tallied just one assist in the five-game series.

In his third season with the Sea Dogs in 2015–16, Chabot recorded 11 goals and 45 points in 47 games. The Sea Dogs made the playoffs for the second consecutive season and advanced to the semifinals where they were beaten by the Shawinigan Cataractes. In 17 playoff games, he added three goals and 21 points. In 2016–17, his final season with the Sea Dogs, Chabot tallied ten goals and 45 points in 34 games. In February 2017, he was suspended twice by the QMJHL, once for an illegal use of his hockey stick on an opposing player and the second for an illegal check to the head of an opponent. In total he was suspended for four games. On March 15, Chabot set a franchise record as the Sea Dogs' all-time top scoring defenceman. The Sea Dogs qualified for the playoffs for the third consecutive season and defeated the Blainville-Boisbriand Armada to win the President's Cup as champions of the league. In 18 playoff games, he added five goals and 23 points. He was named the playoff most valuable players and awarded the Guy Lafleur Trophy. As league champions, the Sea Dogs represented the QMJHL at the 2017 Memorial Cup, a round-robin tournament in which the champions of the three leagues that comprise the Canadian Hockey League face off against each other and a host team. The Sea Dogs went on to lose in the semifinals to the Ontario Hockey League's Erie Otters. At the conclusion of the season, Chabot earned the Sea Dogs' Top Defenceman Award and the Fans Choice Award. He was also awarded the Emile Bouchard Trophy as the QMJHL's best defenceman and the Paul Dumont Trophy as the league's personality of the year in April. In 2023, he was named to the Sea Dogs Hall of Fame.

=== Professional ===
Chabot was selected by the Ottawa Senators of the National Hockey League (NHL) in the first round, 18th overall, in the 2015 NHL entry draft. He attended the Senators' 2015 rookie and main training camps after taking part in Hockey Canada's National Team Summer Showcase held in Calgary during late-summer, playing in three preseason games with Ottawa. He was returned to Saint John on September 30, 2015, the same day he signed a three-year entry-level contract with Ottawa. A year later, Chabot attended the Senators' 2016 training camp and made the team, making his NHL debut on October 18, 2016, versus the Arizona Coyotes. Despite remaining with the team for nearly a month, he was a healthy scratch eight times. He was returned to the Sea Dogs in November for his final major junior season after playing in the one game with the Senators.

To start the 2017–18 season, Chabot was sent to Ottawa's American Hockey League affiliate, the Belleville Senators, where he recorded two goals and five assists in 12 games before being recalled by Ottawa in November. He scored his first NHL goal, and recorded two assists, in a 6–5 win over the New York Islanders on December 1, 2017. On April 2, 2018, he recorded two goals and assisted on another in a 6–5 loss to the Winnipeg Jets to record his first multi-goal game. In his first NHL season, he finished with nine goals and 16 assists for 25 points in 63 games, while averaging less than 18 minutes of ice-time per game. Chabot had a breakout season in 2018–19, finishing with 14 goals and 55 points in 70 games, the tenth-highest among NHL defencemen.. He recorded another multi-goal game on October 6, scoring twice and assisting on another in a 5–3 victory over the Toronto Maple Leafs. One month later on November 6, he tallied three points, scoring once and assisting twice in a 7–3 win over the New Jersey Devils. As the season progressed, his ice-time jumped to an average of 25 minutes per game and he assumed first-pairing duties alongside Dylan DeMelo. He was one of only three defencemen under the age of 25 to score 50 points or more, along with Jacob Trouba and Morgan Rielly. However, in November, he was among seven players forced to release an apology after a video was released showing the players discussing the team negatively. That season, Chabot was selected to appear in the NHL All-Star Game. With Ottawa's top two scorers, Mark Stone and Matt Duchene, both sent away at the trading deadline, Chabot finished the season as the team's leading scorer. Following the season, hockey writers began listing Chabot as one of the NHL's top defencemen, The Senators were eliminated from playoff contention in March. In September 2019, he signed an eight-year, $64 million contract extension with the Senators.

To begin the 2019–20 season, Chabot was paired with Nikita Zaitsev, but by November, was back alongside DeMelo. In February 2020, DeMelo was traded away, a deal that was viewed negatively by critics who believed he allowed Chabot to play better when paired with him. Shortly thereafter, the season was suspended on March 12, due to the COVID-19 pandemic. In 71 games, he scored six goals and 39 points as the Senators failed to qualify for the playoffs again. In the pandemic-shortened 2020–21 season he was named as one of the Senators' alternate captains. He made 49 appearances, scoring six goals and 31 points, again anchoring the Senators defence. The Senators were eliminated from the playoffs and on May 4, 2021, Chabot took a hard hit from Jets' defenceman Logan Stanley that forced him to miss the rest of the season.

In the seasons that followed, Chabot was the keystone player in Ottawa's defence corps, which was otherwise considered thin by many commentators and had no stable partner since DeMelo. As a result, he logged very high minutes per game. In the 2021–22 season he averaged 26:23 minutes of ice time per game, the highest for any player on any team in the league. On March 5, 2022. in an 8–5 loss to the Coyotes, Chabot recorded three assists. He repeated the feat on April 29, in a 4–2 victory over the Philadelphia Flyers. He finished with seven goals and 38 points in 59 games. During the 2022–23 season, Chabot struggled, with growing criticism of his game, though some argued that injury and overuse have affected his play. On January 18, 2023, he recorded three assists in a 5–4 overtime victory over the Pittsburgh Penguins. Later that month on January 31, he again tallied three assists, in a 5–4 victory over the Montreal Canadiens. On February 27, he recorded another three-point game, scoring once and adding two assists in a 6–2 victory over the Detroit Red Wings. Chabot missed time with injury again that season, suffering a concussion in November, and an upper body injury in March that ended his season prematurely. In 68 appearances, he tallied 11 goals and 41 points. The Senators did not qualify for the playoffs for the sixth consecutive season.

Jakob Chychrun was acquired from the Coyotes to help stabilize the Senators' defence, but between him, Chabot and up and coming Jake Sanderson, the defence remained in a state of flux in the 2023–24 season. Chabot's season was plagued by injuries again, suffering a hand injury on October 28 that caused him to miss ten games and then two games after returning, suffered a leg injury that kept him out of the lineup for a month, before a knee injury sidelined him in March 2024. He finished the season with nine goals and 31 points in 51 games. In the offseason Chychrun was dealt for Nick Jensen who provided Chabot with the solid defensive partner he had missed since DeMelo. As a result, he saw his best offensive total since 2018–19. On April 13, he marked one goal and added two assists for the a three-point effort in a 4–3 overtime win over the Flyers. In nearly a full season of 80 games, he marked nine goals and 45 points. The Senators qualified for the playoffs for the first time in Chabot's career, facing the Maple Leafs in the opening round. He made his playoff debut on April 20. Chabot marked his first career playoff goal on April 29 in a 4–0 victory. The Senators were eliminated in six games in their best-of-seven series. In the six games, Chabot tallied the one goal and four points.

During the 2025–26 season, Chabot suffered an upper-body injury after taking a hit from Dallas Stars forward Colin Blackwell. He also suffered a broken arm injury after taken a cross-check from New York Rangers captain J. T. Miller in a game on March 23, 2026, and needed surgery. Chabot was expected to miss four-to-eight weeks but 17 days later, he returned to the line-up in a 5–1 win against the Florida Panthers on April 10. He finished the season with seven goals and 31 points in 57 games. The Senators qualified for the final playoff spot and faced the Carolina Hurricanes, the top team in the Eastern Conference, in the first round. The Hurricanes swept the Senators in four games. Chabot went scoreless in the series.

On September 29, 2026, Chabot was named the eleventh captain of the Senators.

== International play ==
Medal record

Representing Canada

Ice hockey

World Championships
| Silver medal – second place | 2019 Slovakia | |
| Silver medal – second place | 2022 Finland | |

World Junior Championships
| Silver medal – second place | 2017 Canada | |

IIHF World U18 Championship
| Bronze medal – third place | 2015 Switzerland | |

Chabot played at the 2015 IIHF World U18 Championships where he won a bronze medal with Team Canada.

On December 1, 2015, Chabot was invited to the Team Canada selection camp for the 2016 World Junior Hockey Championships. He made the team and finished with three points in five games, but Canada finished sixth. Chabot was selected as an alternate captain for Team Canada at the 2017 World Junior Ice Hockey Championships. He helped guide Canada to a silver medal and was one of the top five scorers in the tournament. Chabot was named the tournament MVP and the best defenceman at the tournament.

On April 12, 2018, he was one of the 18 players to be named to the 2018 IIHF World Championship to represent Canada. He finished the tournament with one point in six games while Team Canada finished fourth. On April 29, 2019, he was again named to represent Canada at the 2019 IIHF World Championship. He helped Canada progress through to the playoff rounds before losing the final to Finland to finish with the silver medal on May 26, 2019. He was named captain of Team Canada for the 2022 IIHF World Championship. Team Canada finished with the silver medal, after losing the final game 4–3 in overtime to Finland.

== Career statistics ==
=== Regular season and playoffs ===
| | | | Regular season | | | | | Playoffs |
| Season | Team | League | GP | G | A | Pts | PIM | GP | G | A | Pts | PIM |
|---|---|---|---|---|---|---|---|---|---|---|---|---|
| 2012–13 | Lévis Commandeurs | QMAAA | 41 | 6 | 20 | 26 | 22 | 4 | 1 | 1 | 2 | 8 |
| 2013–14 | Saint John Sea Dogs | QMJHL | 55 | 1 | 21 | 22 | 36 | — | — | — | — | — |
| 2014–15 | Saint John Sea Dogs | QMJHL | 66 | 12 | 29 | 41 | 62 | 5 | 0 | 1 | 1 | 6 |
| 2015–16 | Saint John Sea Dogs | QMJHL | 47 | 11 | 34 | 45 | 79 | 17 | 3 | 18 | 21 | 13 |
| 2016–17 | Saint John Sea Dogs | QMJHL | 34 | 10 | 35 | 45 | 43 | 18 | 5 | 18 | 23 | 12 |
| 2016–17 | Ottawa Senators | NHL | 1 | 0 | 0 | 0 | 0 | — | — | — | — | — |
| 2017–18 | Belleville Senators | AHL | 13 | 2 | 5 | 7 | 8 | — | — | — | — | — |
| 2017–18 | Ottawa Senators | NHL | 63 | 9 | 16 | 25 | 14 | — | — | — | — | — |
| 2018–19 | Ottawa Senators | NHL | 70 | 14 | 41 | 55 | 32 | — | — | — | — | — |
| 2019–20 | Ottawa Senators | NHL | 71 | 6 | 33 | 39 | 42 | — | — | — | — | — |
| 2020–21 | Ottawa Senators | NHL | 49 | 6 | 25 | 31 | 36 | — | — | — | — | — |
| 2021–22 | Ottawa Senators | NHL | 59 | 7 | 31 | 38 | 26 | — | — | — | — | — |
| 2022–23 | Ottawa Senators | NHL | 68 | 11 | 30 | 41 | 52 | — | — | — | — | — |
| 2023–24 | Ottawa Senators | NHL | 51 | 9 | 21 | 30 | 22 | — | — | — | — | — |
| 2024–25 | Ottawa Senators | NHL | 80 | 9 | 36 | 45 | 24 | 6 | 1 | 3 | 4 | 2 |
| 2025–26 | Ottawa Senators | NHL | 57 | 7 | 24 | 31 | 22 | 4 | 0 | 0 | 0 | 2 |
| NHL totals | | | 569 | 78 | 257 | 335 | 270 | 10 | 1 | 3 | 4 | 4 |

=== International ===
| Year | Team | Event | Result | GP | G | A | Pts | PIM |
|---|---|---|---|---|---|---|---|---|
| 2015 | Canada | U18 | 3rd place, bronze medalist(s) | 7 | 1 | 4 | 5 | 0 |
| 2016 | Canada | WJC | 6th | 5 | 0 | 3 | 3 | 4 |
| 2017 | Canada | WJC | 2nd place, silver medalist(s) | 7 | 4 | 6 | 10 | 8 |
| 2018 | Canada | WC | 4th | 6 | 0 | 1 | 1 | 0 |
| 2019 | Canada | WC | 2nd place, silver medalist(s) | 10 | 2 | 5 | 7 | 8 |
| 2022 | Canada | WC | 2nd place, silver medalist(s) | 10 | 0 | 4 | 4 | 6 |
| Junior totals | | | | 19 | 5 | 13 | 18 | 12 |
| Senior totals | | | | 26 | 2 | 10 | 12 | 14 |

== Awards and honours ==
| Award | Year |
QMJHL
| CHL/NHL Top Prospects Game | 2015 |
| Second All-Star Team | 2016 |
| First All-Star Team | 2017 |
| Emile Bouchard Trophy | 2017 |
| Paul Dumont Trophy | 2017 |
| Guy Lafleur Trophy | 2017 |
NHL
| NHL All-Star Game | 2019 |
International
| WJC MVP | 2017 |
| WJC Best Defenceman | 2017 |
| WJC All-Star Team | 2017 |
| WJC All-Decade Team | 2019 |

Awards and achievements
| Preceded by Curtis Lazar | Ottawa Senators first-round draft pick 2015 | Succeeded by Colin White |
Sporting positions
| Preceded by Brady Tkachuk | Ottawa Senators captain 2026–present | Incumbent |
