= Alexander Nylander =

Swedish ice hockey player (born 1998)

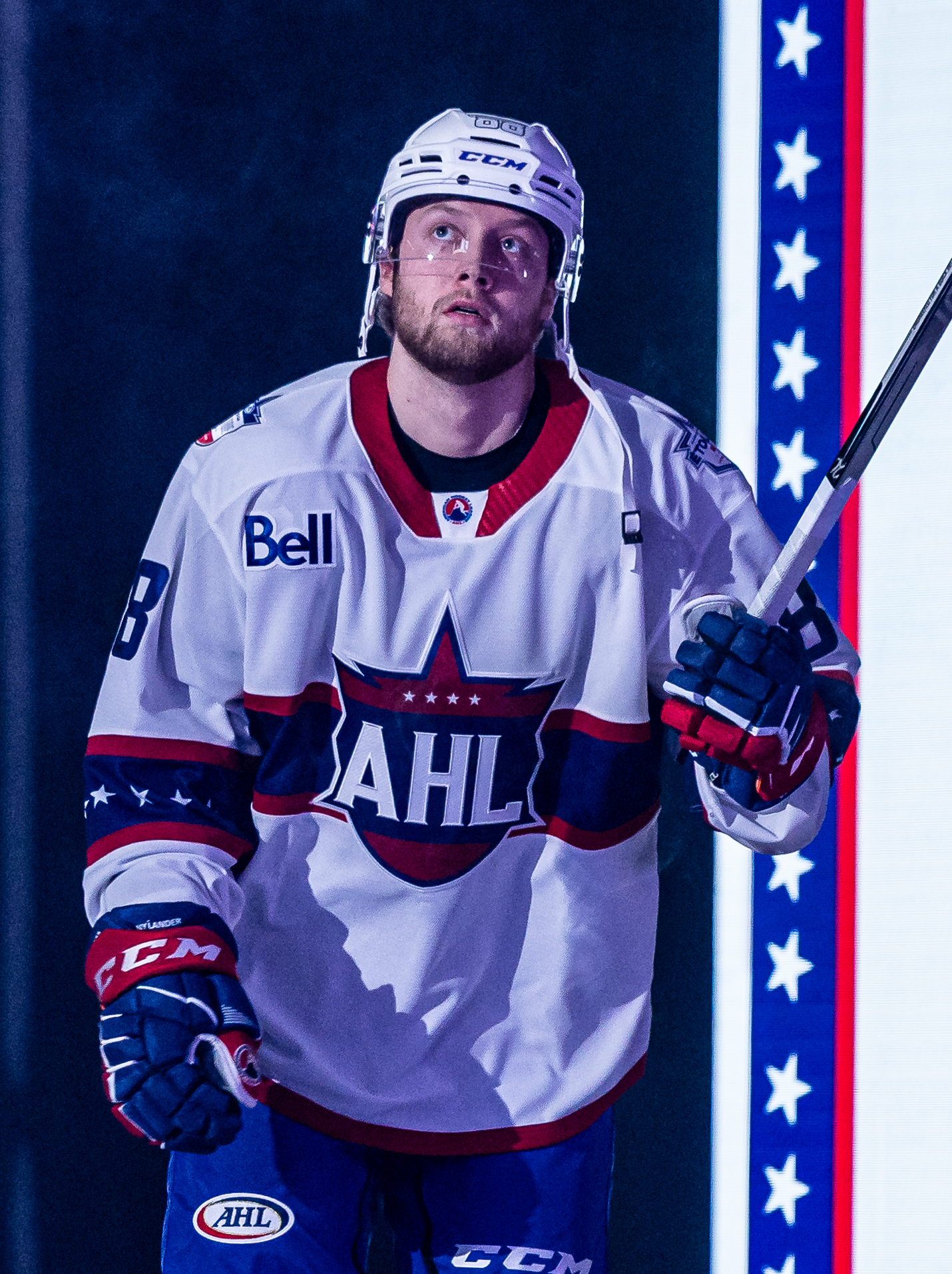
- Nylander at the 2023 AHL All Star Classic Game
- Born: 2 March 1998 (age 28) Calgary, Alberta, Canada
- Height: 6 ft 1 in (185 cm)
- Weight: 205 lb (93 kg; 14 st 9 lb)
- Position: Forward
- Shoots: Right
- NHL team (P) Cur. team Former teams: Calgary Flames; Calgary Wranglers (AHL); Buffalo Sabres; Chicago Blackhawks; Pittsburgh Penguins; Columbus Blue Jackets; Toronto Maple Leafs
- National team: Sweden
- NHL draft: 8th overall, 2016; Buffalo Sabres
- Playing career: 2016–present

Alexander Maximilian Michael Junior Nylander Altelius (born 2 March 1998) is a Swedish professional ice hockey forward who is currently with the Calgary Wranglers in the American Hockey League (AHL) while under contract to the Calgary Flames of the National Hockey League (NHL). He was selected eighth overall by the Buffalo Sabres in the 2016 NHL entry draft. He is the brother of William Nylander. Like his brother, he was born in Canada while his father Michael played for the Flames, but represented Sweden internationally.

== Playing career ==
=== Major junior ===
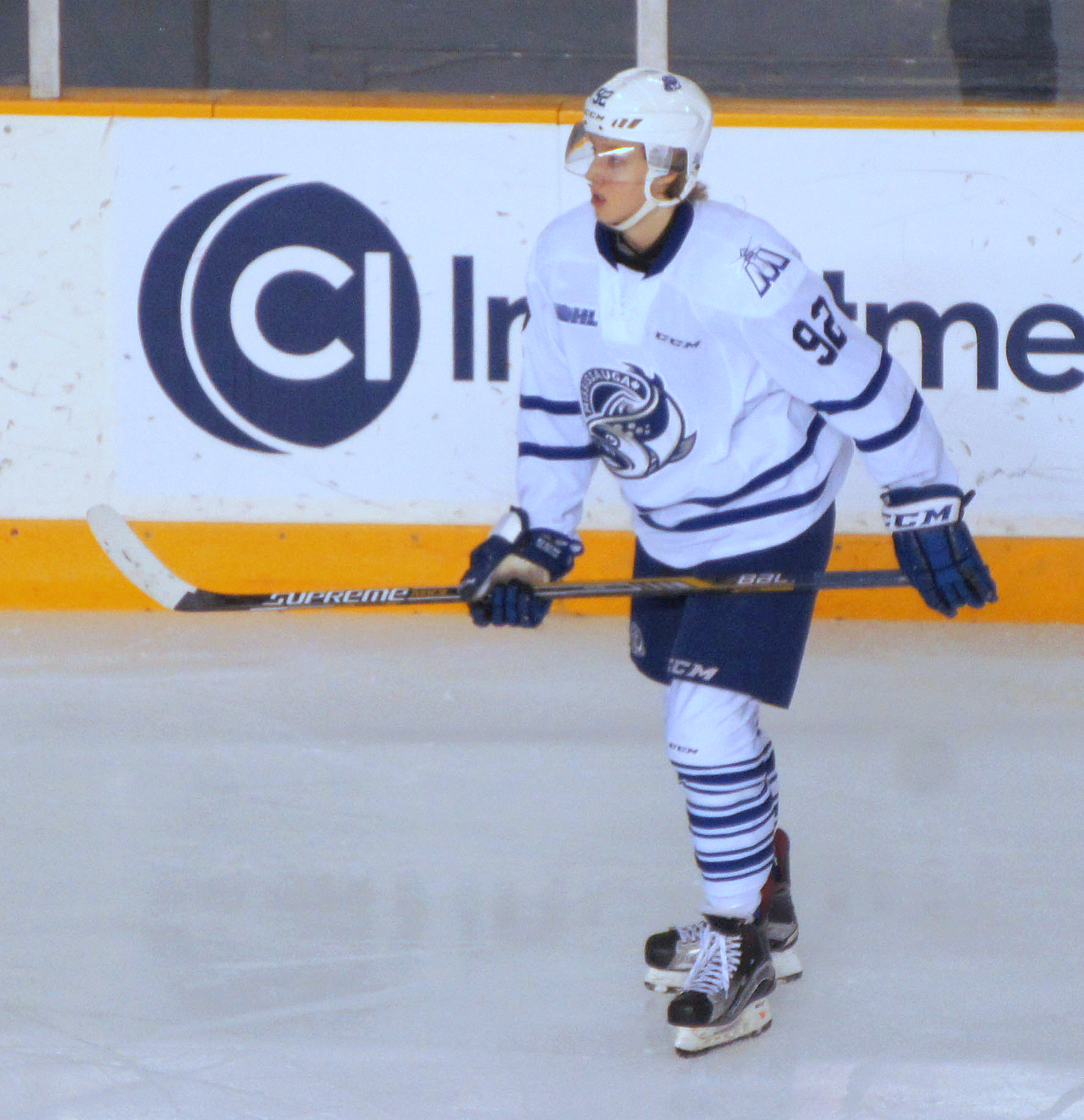
Nylander with the Mississauga Steelheads in 2016

Nylander was selected 12th overall by the Mississauga Steelheads of the Ontario Hockey League (OHL) at the 2015 Canadian Hockey League (CHL) Import Draft. On 5 September 2015, Nylander committed to the Steelheads with his father joining as assistant coach. His reasons for joining include being close to his brother William and having the chance to play the Canadian style of hockey.

In his only season with the Steelheads, Nylander led all rookies in scoring, and was awarded both the Emms Family Award as OHL Rookie of the Year and CHL Rookie of the Year.

Leading up to the NHL draft, Nylander was ranked the no. 3 North American skater. He was described as a dynamic offensive player with a great shot and playmaking ability.

=== Professional ===
Nylander was selected eighth overall by the Buffalo Sabres of the National Hockey League (NHL) in the 2016 NHL entry draft. On 15 July 2016, the Sabres signed Nylander to a three-year entry-level contract. Nylander was called up to the NHL for the first time on 3 April 2017, to play in a game against the Toronto Maple Leafs. Nylander played 14:28 minutes during the 4–2 loss. After playing four games in the NHL he was reassigned back to their American Hockey League (AHL) affiliate, the Rochester Americans. The Sabres assigned Nylander to their AHL affiliate before finalizing their roster for the 2017–18 season. Nylander suffered a lower-body injury in mid-September during the Buffalo Sabres' first prospect game, causing him to miss the rest of the training camp and the beginning of the 2017–18 AHL season. He returned to the lineup on 17 November 2017, for a game against the Hartford Wolf Pack. Despite a slow start, Nylander was called up to the NHL on 3 April 2018. He recorded his first career NHL goal on 6 April 2018 in a game against the Tampa Bay Lightning. After the Sabres failed to qualify for the 2018 Stanley Cup playoffs, Nylander was reassigned to the AHL.

On 9 July 2019, Nylander was traded by the Sabres to the Chicago Blackhawks in exchange for fellow first-rounder Henri Jokiharju and opted to wear sweater no. 92 with the club, the same number his father wore. Nylander appeared in 65 games during the condensed 2019–20 season for the Blackhawks, where he recorded 10 goals and 16 assists. Nylander appeared in eight postseason games for Chicago but failed to register a point. He injured his left knee in the first round of the 2020 Stanley Cup playoffs, and missed the entire 2020–21 season while recovering from surgery. Nylander re-signed with Chicago on a one-year contract worth $874,125 on 16 August 2021. Beginning the 2021–22 season on the injured reserve, Nylander missed the first half of the season.

On returning to health, Nylander was traded to the Pittsburgh Penguins, in exchange for Sam Lafferty on 5 January 2022. He split time between Pittsburgh and their AHL affiliate, the Wilkes-Barre/Scranton Penguins. He signed a one-year contract extension on 29 April 2023 with Pittsburgh.

In the midst of the 2023–24 season, having split time between Wilkes-Barre/Scranton and Pittsburgh for the third successive season, Nylander was traded following five games with the Penguins, along with a conditional 2026 sixth round pick to the Columbus Blue Jackets in exchange for Emil Bemström on 23 February 2024. Instantly joining the Blue Jackets, Nylander made his debut with Columbus in a 4–2 victory over the New York Rangers on 25 February 2024, and recorded his first NHL hat trick in a 6–3 win against the Vegas Golden Knights on 4 March 2024. In an elevated offensive role with the Blue Jackets, Nylander responded in notching a career best 11 goals through just 23 games to close out the season.

As a free agent from the Blue Jackets at the conclusion of his contract, Nylander was unable to secure an NHL deal and opted to sign a one-year AHL contract with the Toronto Marlies of the AHL, affiliate to the Toronto Maple Leafs on 28 July 2024. Nylander began the 2024–25 season, posting 8 goals and 12 points in 14 appearances with the Marlies. With the Maple Leafs suffering a spate of injuries, he was signed to a one-year league minimum contract and instantly recalled to the Maple Leafs on 22 November. Nylander was assigned to the Toronto Marlies after he cleared waivers on 12 December. He would play 5 games with the Maple Leafs but spend the majority of the season with the Toronto Marlies, after which he was not resigned to a new contract and released to unrestricted free agency.

On 4 August 2025, Nylander opted to remain within the Maple Leafs organization after going un-signed over the summer, agreeing to a one-year AHL contract with the Marlies for the 2025–26 season.

== International play ==
Medal record

Representing Sweden

Men's ice hockey

World Junior Championships
Silver medal – second place	2018 United States	

IIHF World U18 Championship
Silver medal – second place	2016 United States	

Despite being born in Canada, like his brother, Nylander represents Sweden internationally.

At the 2016 World Junior Championships, Nylander led the Sweden junior team in points with four goals and five assists. Sweden finished fourth in the tournament. Nylander was also chosen to represent Sweden at the 2018 World Junior Championships. In the tournament Nylander recorded one goal and six assists in seven games, while Sweden won silver medals.

== Personal life ==
Nylander was born in Calgary while his father, Michael, played for the Calgary Flames. He spent the majority of his youth in the United States where his father played for a multitude of NHL teams, and spending the summers in Sweden.

His older brother, William also plays for the Toronto Maple Leafs. He was also drafted 8th overall, 2 years earlier.

== Career statistics ==
=== Regular season and playoffs ===
			Regular season					Playoffs
Season	Team	League	GP	G	A	Pts	PIM	GP	G	A	Pts	PIM
2014–15	AIK	J20	42	15	25	40	12	2	0	1	1	0
2014–15	AIK	Allsv	3	0	0	0	0	4	1	1	2	0
2015–16	Mississauga Steelheads	OHL	57	28	47	75	18	6	6	6	12	2
2016–17	Rochester Americans	AHL	65	10	18	28	6	—	—	—	—	—
2016–17	Buffalo Sabres	NHL	4	0	1	1	0	—	—	—	—	—
2017–18	Rochester Americans	AHL	51	8	19	27	10	3	0	0	0	0
2017–18	Buffalo Sabres	NHL	3	1	0	1	0	—	—	—	—	—
2018–19	Rochester Americans	AHL	49	12	19	31	12	—	—	—	—	—
2018–19	Buffalo Sabres	NHL	12	2	2	4	4	—	—	—	—	—
2019–20	Chicago Blackhawks	NHL	65	10	16	26	10	8	0	0	0	2
2021–22	Rockford IceHogs	AHL	23	8	4	12	2	—	—	—	—	—
2021–22	Wilkes-Barre/Scranton Penguins	AHL	44	14	16	30	8	6	3	3	6	0
2022–23	Wilkes-Barre/Scranton Penguins	AHL	55	25	25	50	8	—	—	—	—	—
2022–23	Pittsburgh Penguins	NHL	9	1	1	2	6	—	—	—	—	—
2023–24	Wilkes-Barre/Scranton Penguins	AHL	43	17	15	32	6	—	—	—	—	—
2023–24	Pittsburgh Penguins	NHL	5	0	0	0	0	—	—	—	—	—
2023–24	Columbus Blue Jackets	NHL	23	11	4	15	6	—	—	—	—	—
2024–25	Toronto Marlies	AHL	64	23	21	44	14	2	1	0	1	0
2024–25	Toronto Maple Leafs	NHL	5	0	0	0	4	—	—	—	—	—
2025–26	Toronto Marlies	AHL	65	24	29	53	12	24	6	1	7	2
NHL totals			126	25	24	49	32	8	0	0	0	2

=== International ===
Year	Team	Event	Result	GP	G	A	Pts	PIM
2014	Sweden	U17	3rd place, bronze medalist(s)	6	2	5	7	0
2015	Sweden	IH18	2nd place, silver medalist(s)	5	2	4	6	6
2016	Sweden	U18	2nd place, silver medalist(s)	7	3	8	11	0
2016	Sweden	WJC	4th	7	4	5	9	0
2017	Sweden	WJC	4th	7	5	7	12	0
2018	Sweden	WJC	2nd place, silver medalist(s)	7	1	6	7	2
2023	Sweden	WC	6th	8	0	2	2	2
Junior totals				32	14	27	41	8
Senior totals				8	0	2	2	2

== Awards and honors ==
Award	Year
AHL
Calder Cup champion	2026

Awards and achievements
Preceded by Jack Eichel	Buffalo Sabres first-round draft pick 2016	Succeeded by Casey Mittelstadt
