= Yegor Rykov =

Russian ice hockey player (born 1997)

- Born: 14 April 1997 (age 29) Vidnoe, Russia
- Height: 6 ft 2 in (188 cm)
- Weight: 205 lb (93 kg; 14 st 9 lb)
- Position: Defence
- Shoots: Left
- KHL team Former teams: Amur Khabarovsk; SKA Saint Petersburg; HC Sochi; CSKA Moscow; Severstal Cherepovets; Admiral Vladivostok; Avangard Omsk; HC Vityaz; Lada Togliatti; Traktor Chelyabinsk
- NHL draft: 132nd overall, 2016; New Jersey Devils
- Playing career: 2016–present

Yegor Alexandrovich Rykov (Russian: Егор Александрович Рыков; born 14 April 1997) is a Russian professional ice hockey defenceman who is currently under contract with Amur Khabarovsk of the Kontinental Hockey League (KHL).

== Playing career ==
Rykov was drafted 132nd overall by the New Jersey Devils in the 2016 NHL entry draft. Despite being drafted, Rykov extended his KHL contract with the SKA Saint Petersburg until 30 April 2019. On 22 February 2018, the Devils traded his playing rights, along with a second-round draft pick in the 2018 NHL entry draft, to the New York Rangers in exchange for forward Michael Grabner. Rykov received little playing time with SKA to begin the 2018–19 season, and was subsequently traded to HC Sochi. On 20 May 2019, Rykov signed an entry-level contract with the New York Rangers.

In his debut North American season in 2019–20 after attending the Rangers training camp, Rykov was assigned to AHL affiliate the Hartford Wolf Pack. Limited to 27 games, Rykov contributed with 2 goal and 11 points, before the season was prematurely cancelled due to the COVID-19 pandemic.

Approaching the second year of his contract with the Rangers and with the 2020–21 North American season to be delayed, Rykov returned to Russia on loan signing a one-year contract with CSKA Moscow of the KHL on 7 August 2020.

== International play ==
Rykov played in the 2016 World Junior Ice Hockey Championships where he helped team Russia win a silver medal.

== Career statistics ==
=== Regular season and playoffs ===
			Regular season					Playoffs
Season	Team	League	GP	G	A	Pts	PIM	GP	G	A	Pts	PIM
2013–14	SKA-1946	MHL	37	1	6	7	20	4	0	0	0	2
2014–15	SKA-1946	MHL	42	5	16	21	8	7	1	1	2	0
2015–16	SKA Saint Petersburg	KHL	10	0	1	1	0	2	0	0	0	2
2015–16	SKA-Neva	VHL	10	0	2	2	8	5	1	0	1	0
2015–16	SKA-1946	MHL	20	3	7	10	10	2	0	0	0	0
2016–17	SKA Saint Petersburg	KHL	47	0	9	9	8	15	0	0	0	7
2016–17	SKA-1946	MHL	—	—	—	—	—	1	0	0	0	0
2017–18	SKA Saint Petersburg	KHL	53	2	12	14	20	13	0	2	2	5
2017–18	SKA-Neva	VHL	7	0	6	6	2	8	1	1	2	2
2017–18	SKA-1946	MHL	—	—	—	—	—	1	0	0	0	2
2018–19	SKA-Neva	VHL	1	0	0	0	0	—	—	—	—	—
2018–19	HC Sochi	KHL	47	3	6	9	8	6	0	3	3	0
2019–20	Hartford Wolf Pack	AHL	27	2	9	11	6	—	—	—	—	—
2020–21	CSKA Moscow	KHL	49	0	9	9	10	16	0	1	1	2
2021–22	Severstal Cherepovets	KHL	25	0	9	9	0	—	—	—	—	—
2021–22	Admiral Vladivostok	KHL	4	0	1	1	0	—	—	—	—	—
2022–23	Admiral Vladivostok	KHL	8	0	0	0	4	—	—	—	—	—
2023–24	Avangard Omsk	KHL	5	0	0	0	0	—	—	—	—	—
2023–24	Omskie Krylia	VHL	8	0	2	2	2	—	—	—	—	—
2024–25	HC Vityaz	KHL	50	1	6	7	4	—	—	—	—	—
2025–26	Lada Togliatti	KHL	4	0	1	1	2	—	—	—	—	—
2025–26	Traktor Chelyabinsk	KHL	3	0	1	1	0	—	—	—	—	—
2025–26	Amur Khabarovsk	KHL	22	1	8	9	4	—	—	—	—	—
KHL totals			327	7	63	70	60	52	0	6	6	16

=== International ===
Year	Team	Event	Result	GP	G	A	Pts	PIM
2014	Russia	U17	3rd place, bronze medalist(s)	6	0	4	4	0
2014	Russia	IH18	5th	4	1	1	2	0
2015	Russia	U18	5th	5	0	0	0	0
2016	Russia	WJC	2nd place, silver medalist(s)	7	1	2	3	2
2017	Russia	WJC	3rd place, bronze medalist(s)	7	1	6	7	0
Junior totals				29	3	13	16	2

== Awards and honors ==
Award	Year
KHL
Gagarin Cup (SKA Saint Petersburg])	2017
