= Pavel Karnaukhov =

Russian ice hockey player (born 1997)

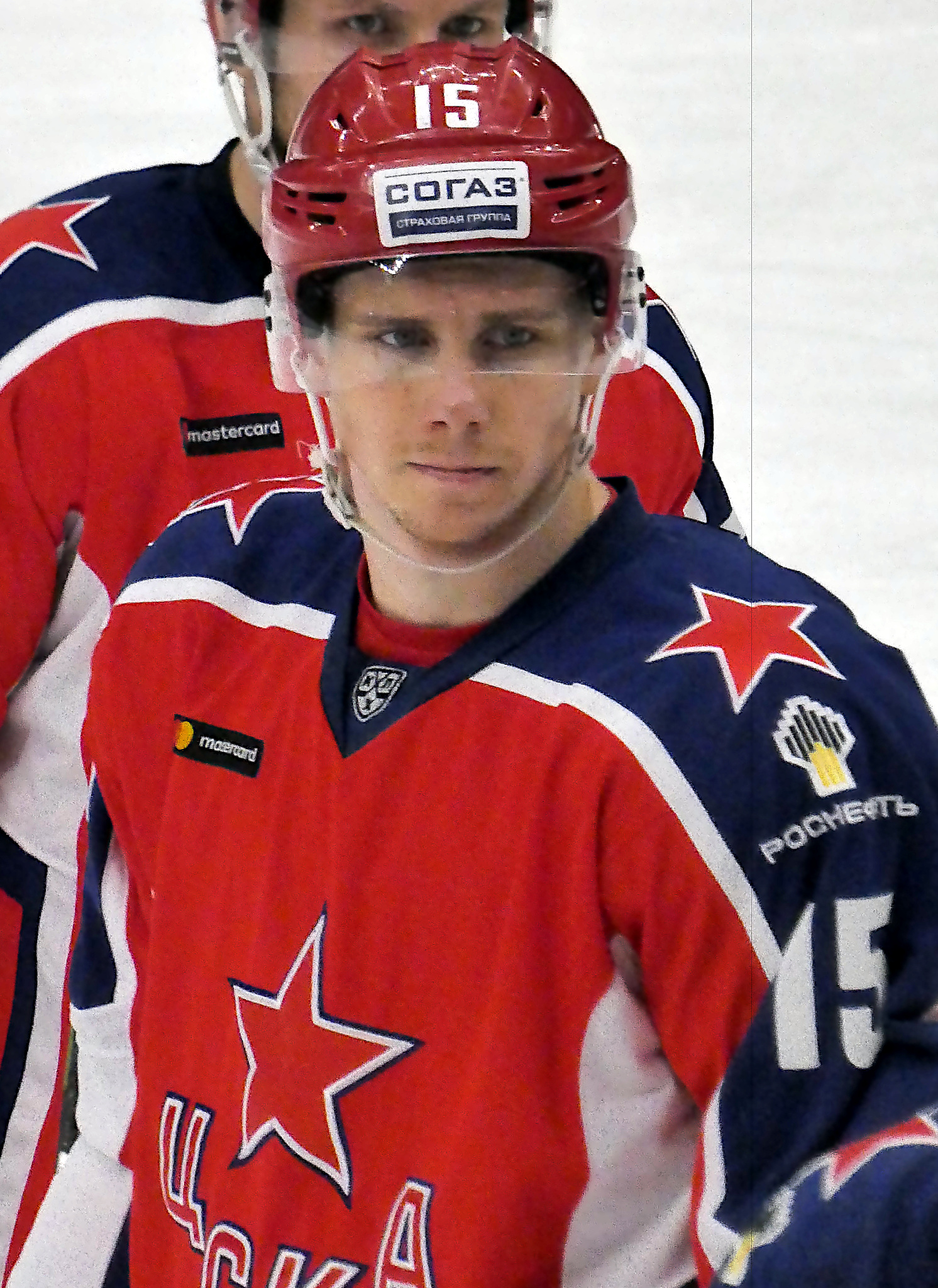
- Karnaukhov with CSKA Moscow in 2019
- Born: 15 March 1997 (age 29) Minsk, Belarus
- Height: 6 ft 2 in (188 cm)
- Weight: 212 lb (96 kg; 15 st 2 lb)
- Position: Left wing
- Shoots: Left
- KHL team: CSKA Moscow
- National team: Russia
- NHL draft: 136th overall, 2015; Calgary Flames
- Playing career: 2016–present

Pavel Karnaukhov (Russian: Павел Андреевич Карнаухов; born 15 March 1997) is a Belarusian-born Russian professional ice hockey forward for CSKA Moscow of the Kontinental Hockey League (KHL). He also plays in the Russian national team.

== Playing career ==
He was selected in the fifth round, 136th overall, in the 2015 NHL entry draft by the Calgary Flames.

== International play ==
Medal record

Ice hockey

Representing ROC

Olympic Games
Silver medal – second place	2022 Beijing	

World Junior Championships
Silver medal – second place	2017 Canada	

On 23 January 2022, Karnaukhov was named to the roster to represent Russian Olympic Committee athletes at the 2022 Winter Olympics.

== Career statistics ==
=== Regular season and playoffs ===
			Regular season					Playoffs
Season	Team	League	GP	G	A	Pts	PIM	GP	G	A	Pts	PIM
2013–14	Krasnaya Armiya	MHL	48	13	16	29	56	11	3	2	5	4
2014–15	Calgary Hitmen	WHL	69	20	22	42	51	17	6	5	11	10
2015–16	Calgary Hitmen	WHL	49	12	19	31	52	5	2	1	3	4
2016–17	CSKA Moscow	KHL	11	0	1	1	12	8	0	0	0	5
2016–17	Zvezda Chekhov	VHL	24	7	11	18	10	3	0	0	0	2
2016–17	Krasnaya Armiya	MHL	2	0	0	0	4	11	5	5	10	4
2017–18	CSKA Moscow	KHL	11	0	2	2	4	2	0	0	0	8
2017–18	Zvezda Chekhov	VHL	40	14	19	33	20	1	0	0	0	0
2018–19	CSKA Moscow	KHL	33	3	6	9	21	12	2	0	2	9
2018–19	Zvezda Chekhov	VHL	9	4	1	5	2	—	—	—	—	—
2019–20	CSKA Moscow	KHL	53	4	5	9	16	4	1	0	1	4
2020–21	CSKA Moscow	KHL	45	10	6	16	53	23	0	3	3	38
2021–22	CSKA Moscow	KHL	37	7	6	13	18	22	4	5	9	18
2022–23	CSKA Moscow	KHL	60	14	15	29	45	27	3	5	8	4
2023–24	CSKA Moscow	KHL	68	14	14	28	28	5	1	0	1	2
2024–25	CSKA Moscow	KHL	67	9	11	20	20	6	1	0	1	0
2025–26	CSKA Moscow	KHL	67	13	13	26	51	10	3	0	3	0
KHL totals			452	74	79	153	268	119	15	13	28	88

=== International ===
Year	Team	Event	Result	GP	G	A	Pts	PIM
2014	Russia	IH18	5th	4	0	1	1	2
2017	Russia	WJC	3rd place, bronze medalist(s)	7	2	2	4	4
2021	ROC	WC	5th	7	2	2	4	0
2022	ROC	OG	2nd place, silver medalist(s)	6	1	1	2	4
Junior totals				11	2	3	5	6
Senior totals				13	3	3	6	4

== Awards and honors ==
Award	Year
KHL
Gagarin Cup (CSKA Moscow)	2019, 2022, 2023
