= Kristoffer Gunnarsson =

Swedish ice hockey player (born 1997)

- Born: 26 February 1997 (age 29) Borås, Sweden
- Height: 6 ft 1 in (185 cm)
- Weight: 209 lb (95 kg; 14 st 13 lb)
- Position: Defence
- Shoots: Left
- Allsv team Former teams: Mora IK; Frölunda HC; Linköpings HC
- NHL draft: 135th overall, 2017; Vancouver Canucks
- Playing career: 2015–present

Kristoffer Gunnarsson Matsson (born 26 February 1997) is a Swedish professional ice hockey defenseman who is currently playing with Mora IK of the HockeyAllsvenskan (Allsv). He was selected by the Vancouver Canucks in the fifth round, 135th overall, of the 2017 NHL entry draft.

== Playing career ==
Gunnarsson played junior hockey with Swedish team Frölunda HC. In 2012 Gunnarsson competed with a regional all-star team from Västergötland in the annual TV-pucken, an under-15 national tournament, and notched one assists over eight games. After impressive performances in the J20 SuperElit, Gunnarsson played 13 games in Sweden's top-flight SHL.

During the 2018–19 season, Gunnarsson recorded 1 goal in 15 games from the blueline with Frölunda before he was loaned to fellow SHL club, Linköpings HC, for the remainder of the season on 3 December 2018.

On 15 May 2019, Gunnersson left the SHL to sign a two-year contract with Mora IK of the HockeyAllsvenskan.

== Career statistics ==
=== Regular season and playoffs ===
			Regular season					Playoffs
Season	Team	League	GP	G	A	Pts	PIM	GP	G	A	Pts	PIM
2014–15	Frölunda HC	J20	38	0	0	0	16	7	0	0	0	0
2015–16	Frölunda HC	J20	36	7	7	14	88	3	0	0	0	4
2015–16	Frölunda HC	SHL	13	0	0	0	0	—	—	—	—	—
2015–16	IK Oskarshamn	Allsv	5	0	0	0	2	—	—	—	—	—
2016–17	Frölunda HC	J20	4	0	0	0	0	4	0	0	0	6
2016–17	Frölunda HC	SHL	10	0	0	0	29	8	0	0	0	6
2016–17	IK Oskarshamn	Allsv	29	1	1	2	8	—	—	—	—	—
2017–18	Frölunda HC	SHL	46	0	0	0	24	6	0	0	0	0
2018–19	Frölunda HC	SHL	15	1	0	1	4	—	—	—	—	—
2018–19	Linköpings HC	SHL	26	0	1	1	18	—	—	—	—	—
2019–20	Mora IK	Allsv	33	1	2	3	22	—	—	—	—	—
2019–20	Kristianstads IK	Allsv	14	0	1	1	37	—	—	—	—	—
2020–21	Mora IK	Allsv	49	1	9	10	18	4	1	0	1	0
2021–22	Mora IK	Allsv	44	2	5	7	12	8	0	0	0	10
2022–23	Mora IK	Allsv	43	0	5	5	18
SHL totals			110	1	1	2	75	14	0	0	0	6

=== International ===
Year	Team	Event	Result	GP	G	A	Pts	PIM
2017	Sweden	WJC	4th	7	0	1	1	2
Junior totals				7	0	1	1	2

== Awards and honors ==
Award	Year
CHL
Champions (Frölunda HC)	2016, 2017, 2019
