= Nikolaj Krag Christensen =

Danish professional ice hockey forward

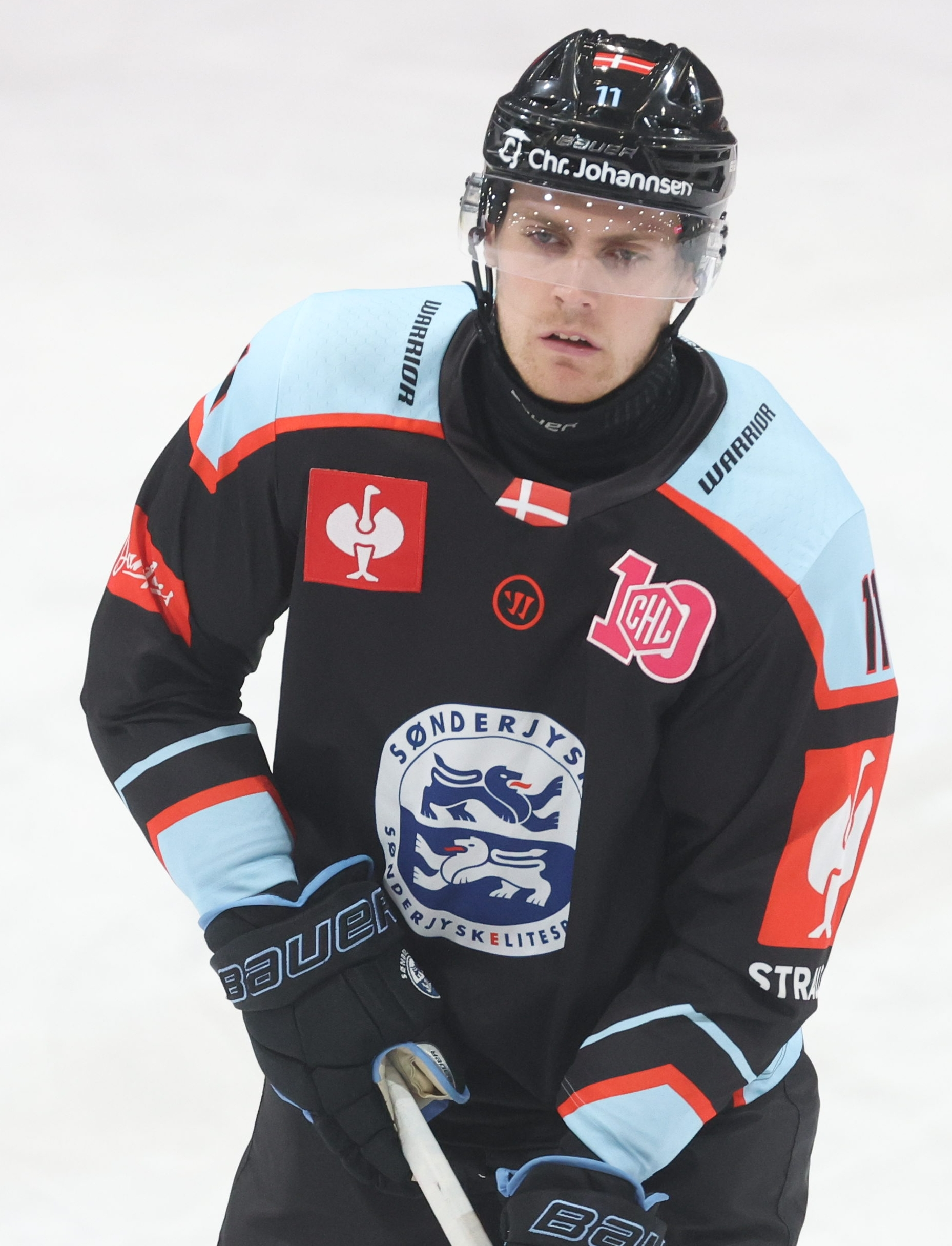
- Nikolaj Krag Christensen, 2024
- Born: 12 August 1998 (age 27) Rødovre, Denmark
- Height: 191 cm (6 ft 3 in)
- Weight: 91 kg (201 lb; 14 st 5 lb)
- Position: Forward
- Shoots: Left
- Metal team Former teams: SønderjyskE; Rødovre Mighty Bulls; Rögle BK; Rungsted Seier Capital; Frederikshavn White Hawks
- NHL draft: 209th overall, 2016; St. Louis Blues
- Playing career: 2016–present

Nikolaj Krag Christensen (born 12 August 1998) is a Danish professional ice hockey forward currently playing for the SønderjyskE of the Danish Metal Ligaen.

Christensen was selected by the St. Louis Blues in the seventh round (209th overall) of the 2016 NHL entry draft.

== Career statistics ==
=== Regular season and playoffs ===
			Regular season					Playoffs
Season	Team	League	GP	G	A	Pts	PIM	GP	G	A	Pts	PIM
2014–15	Rødovre Mighty Bulls	DEN	9	1	1	2	0	—	—	—	—	—
2015–16	Rødovre Mighty Bulls	DEN	30	2	2	4	10	—	—	—	—	—
2016–17	Rögle BK	J20	43	12	12	24	28	3	0	2	2	0
2016–17	Rögle BK	SHL	5	0	0	0	0	—	—	—	—	—
2017–18	HPK	Jr. A	9	3	4	7	0	—	—	—	—	—
2017–18	LeKi	Mestis	5	0	0	0	0	—	—	—	—	—
2017–18	Rungsted Seier Capital	DEN	16	3	7	10	8	14	2	0	2	4
2018–19	Rungsted Seier Capital	DEN	40	5	10	15	20	14	3	4	7	6
2019–20	Frederikshavn White Hawks	DEN	47	14	13	27	6	—	—	—	—	—
2020–21	Frederikshavn White Hawks	DEN	45	11	18	29	22	7	1	2	3	0
2021–22	Frederikshavn White Hawks	DEN	41	7	18	25	4	5	0	1	1	0
2022–23	SønderjyskE	DEN	40	16	20	36	4	3	1	1	2	0
2023–24	SønderjyskE	DEN	47	21	34	55	12	16	4	3	7	4
DEN totals			315	80	123	203	86	59	11	12	23	14
SHL totals			5	0	0	0	0	—	—	—	—	—

=== International ===
Year	Team	Event	Result	GP	G	A	Pts	PIM
2015	Denmark	U18-D1	11th	5	3	1	4	2
2016	Denmark	U18	10th	7	1	5	6	6
2016	Denmark	WJC	8th	5	0	1	1	0
2017	Denmark	WJC	5th	5	2	2	4	2
2018	Denmark	WJC	9th	4	1	1	2	0
Junior totals				26	7	10	17	10
