= Lucas Carlsson =

Swedish ice hockey player (born 1997)

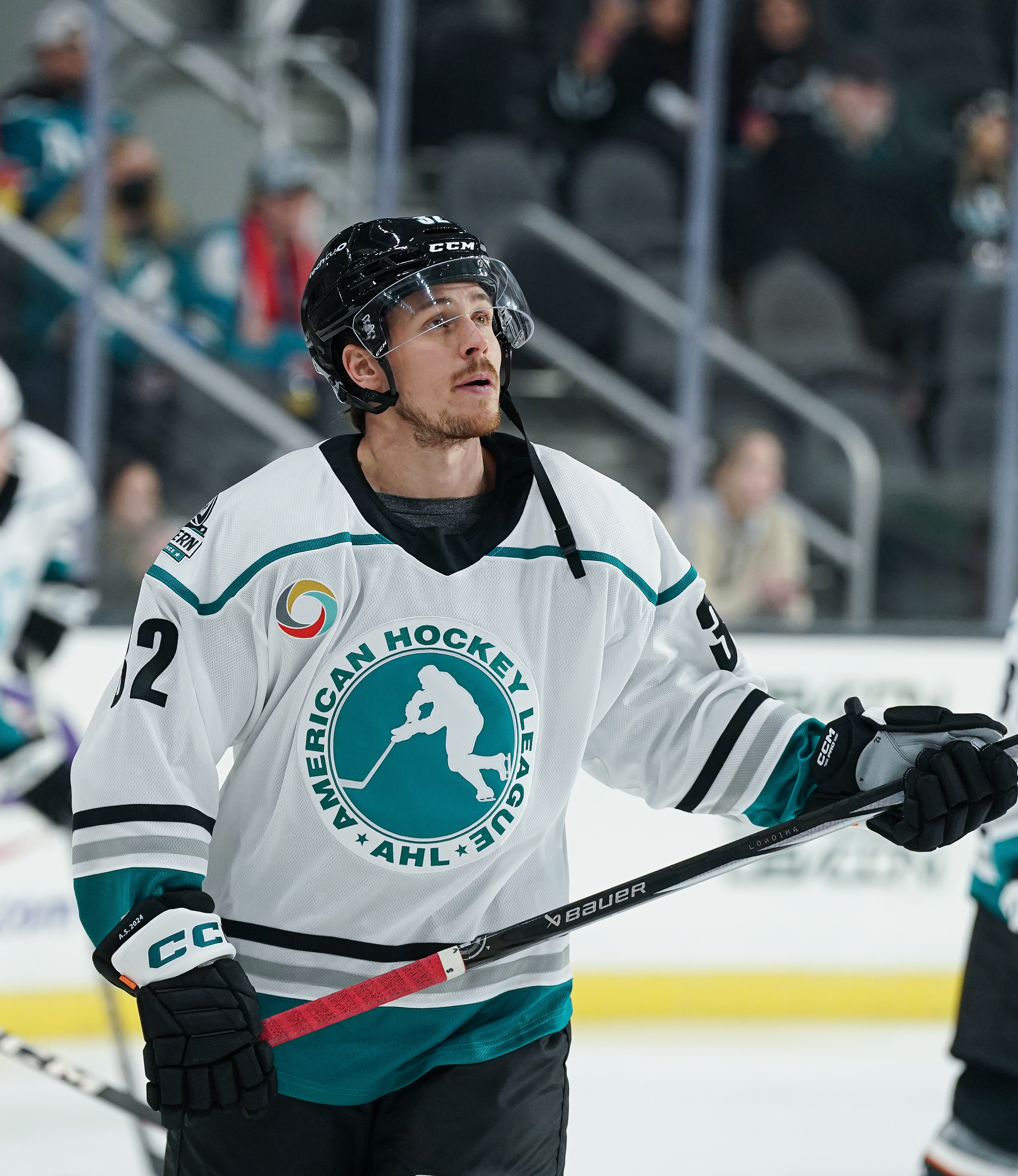
- Carlsson, 2024 AHL AllStar Challenge
- Born: 5 July 1997 (age 29) Gävle, Sweden
- Height: 6 ft 0 in (183 cm)
- Weight: 190 lb (86 kg; 13 st 8 lb)
- Position: Defence
- Shoots: Left
- SHL team Former teams: Djurgårdens IF; Brynäs IF; Chicago Blackhawks; Florida Panthers; San Jose Sharks
- NHL draft: 110th overall, 2016; Chicago Blackhawks
- Playing career: 2014–present

Lucas Carlsson (born 5 July 1997) is a Swedish ice hockey player who is a defenceman for Djurgårdens IF of the Swedish Hockey League (SHL). He was drafted by the Chicago Blackhawks in the fourth round, 110th overall, of the 2016 NHL entry draft.

== Playing career ==
Carlsson made his debut in the Swedish Hockey League (SHL) during the 2014–15 SHL season, suiting up for Brynäs IF.

=== Blackhawks and Panthers ===
After wrapping up his fourth season in the SHL with Brynäs IF in 2017–18, where he continued to develop his game, Carlsson signed a three-year entry-level contract with the Chicago Blackhawks on 21 May 2018.

In the COVID-19-delayed 2020–21 season, after tallying 1 assist over 12 games with the Blackhawks, Carlsson was traded to the Florida Panthers on 8 April 2021, along with Lucas Wallmark. In return, Chicago received Brett Connolly, Riley Stillman, Henrik Borgström, and a seventh-round pick in the 2021 draft.

=== San Jose Sharks ===
After completing three seasons with the Panthers organization, Carlsson entered free agency during the 2024 off-season. Seeking a new opportunity to further his career in North America, he agreed to terms with the San Jose Sharks on 1 July 2024. The contract was a two-year, two-way deal, allowing Carlsson the flexibility to play both at the NHL level with the Sharks and in the AHL with their affiliate, the San Jose Barracuda.

On 21 March 2025, Carlsson was recalled by the San Jose Sharks from their AHL affiliate, the Barracuda. The following day, on 22 March, he made his first NHL appearance since 1 November 2022, and scored the game-winning goal in his debut game with the Sharks.

=== Djurgårdens IF ===
In May 2026, Carlsson joined Stockholm-based Djurgårdens IF of the Swedish Hockey League (SHL) on a four-year contract.

== Career statistics ==
=== Regular season and playoffs ===
			Regular season					Playoffs
Season	Team	League	GP	G	A	Pts	PIM	GP	G	A	Pts	PIM
2012–13	Brynäs IF	J18	17	3	6	9	20	—	—	—	—	—
2012–13	Brynäs IF	J18 Allsv	17	1	7	8	30	3	0	0	0	0
2013–14	Brynäs IF	J18	17	8	14	22	24	—	—	—	—	—
2013–14	Brynäs IF	J18 Allsv	17	6	4	10	72	5	0	5	5	2
2013–14	Brynäs IF	J20	5	1	1	2	10	—	—	—	—	—
2014–15	Brynäs IF	J18	4	2	4	6	0	—	—	—	—	—
2014–15	Brynäs IF	J18 Allsv	5	6	2	8	33	4	4	2	6	2
2014–15	Brynäs IF	J20	42	6	12	18	60	2	0	1	1	4
2014–15	Brynäs IF	SHL	16	0	1	1	2	1	0	0	0	0
2015–16	Brynäs IF	J20	15	1	10	11	53	1	0	0	0	25
2015–16	Brynäs IF	SHL	35	4	5	9	8	3	0	2	2	0
2016–17	Brynäs IF	SHL	41	3	8	11	16	20	0	4	4	4
2017–18	Brynäs IF	SHL	44	7	10	17	28	6	0	0	0	2
2018–19	Rockford IceHogs	AHL	69	9	24	33	34	—	—	—	—	—
2019–20	Rockford IceHogs	AHL	48	5	21	26	26	—	—	—	—	—
2019–20	Chicago Blackhawks	NHL	6	0	1	1	0	1	0	0	0	0
2020–21	Chicago Blackhawks	NHL	12	0	1	1	2	—	—	—	—	—
2020–21	Rockford IceHogs	AHL	7	1	2	3	4	—	—	—	—	—
2020–21	Syracuse Crunch	AHL	11	2	7	9	8	—	—	—	—	—
2021–22	Charlotte Checkers	AHL	8	1	5	6	8	—	—	—	—	—
2021–22	Florida Panthers	NHL	40	3	6	9	10	—	—	—	—	—
2022–23	Charlotte Checkers	AHL	61	20	34	54	42	7	3	3	6	4
2022–23	Florida Panthers	NHL	2	0	0	0	2	—	—	—	—	—
2023–24	Charlotte Checkers	AHL	52	15	24	39	54	—	—	—	—	—
2024–25	San Jose Barracuda	AHL	45	10	13	23	26	4	0	2	2	0
2024–25	San Jose Sharks	NHL	13	1	3	4	14	—	—	—	—	—
2025–26	San Jose Barracuda	AHL	58	12	14	26	30	—	—	—	—	—
SHL totals			136	14	24	38	54	30	0	6	6	6
NHL totals			73	4	11	15	28	1	0	0	0	0

=== International ===
Year	Team	Event	Result	GP	G	A	Pts	PIM
2014	Sweden	U17	6th	5	1	2	3	8
2014	Sweden	IH18	4th	5	2	1	3	4
2015	Sweden	WJC18	8th	5	1	1	2	4
2017	Sweden	WJC	4th	7	1	2	3	4
Junior totals				22	5	6	11	20
