= Colin White (ice hockey, born 1997) =

American ice hockey player (born 1997)

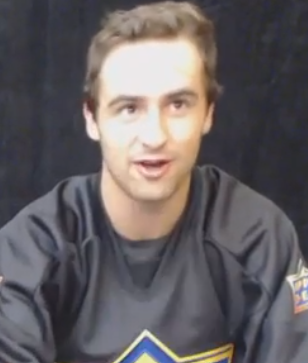
- White in 2017
- Born: January 30, 1997 (age 29) Hanover, Massachusetts, U.S.
- Height: 6 ft 1 in (185 cm)
- Weight: 195 lb (88 kg; 13 st 13 lb)
- Position: Center
- Shoots: Right
- NHL team (P) Cur. team Former teams: New Jersey Devils; Utica Comets (AHL); Ottawa Senators; Florida Panthers; Pittsburgh Penguins; Montreal Canadiens; San Jose Sharks
- National team: United States
- NHL draft: 21st overall, 2015; Ottawa Senators
- Playing career: 2017–present

Colin Andrew White (born January 30, 1997) is an American professional ice hockey player who is a center for the Utica Comets of the American Hockey League (AHL) while under contract to the New Jersey Devils of the National Hockey League (NHL). He was selected in the first round, 21st overall, by the Ottawa Senators in the 2015 NHL entry draft. White has also previously played for the Florida Panthers, Pittsburgh Penguins, Montreal Canadiens, and San Jose Sharks.

== Early life ==
White was born on January 30, 1997, in Hanover, Massachusetts to parents Mark and Christine. His father played collegiate football and track and field at Georgia Tech while his mother played tennis at Florida State University. He began ice skating after his sister had her eighth birthday party at an ice rink. Growing up, he rooted for the Pittsburgh Penguins and his favorite player was Mario Lemieux.

== Playing career ==
White played high school ice hockey at Noble and Greenough School before joining the USA Hockey National Team Development Program (U.S. NTDP). As a member of the U.S. NTDP, he played the 2013–14 and 2014–15 seasons in the United States Hockey League (USHL). White's play was rewarded when he was invited to skate in the 2014 CCM/USA Hockey All-American Prospects Game. In his final season with the U.S. NTDP, White recorded 17 points in 20 games.

White played college ice hockey at Boston College from 2015 to 2017. He scored his first collegiate hat-trick on January 8, 2016, against Providence College. In 2015–16, White was named to the Hockey East All-Rookie Team.

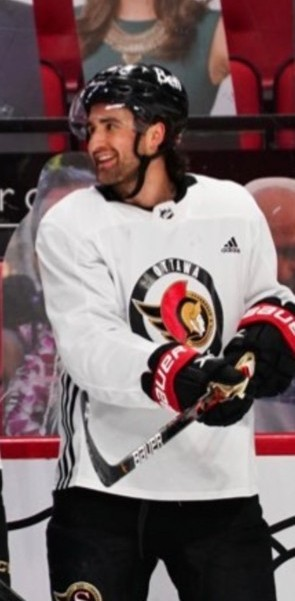
Colin White with the Ottawa Senators in 2025

White was selected by the Ottawa Senators of the National Hockey League (NHL) in the first round, 21st overall, in the 2015 NHL entry draft. Following the 2016–17 NCAA season, White signed an amateur tryout with the Senators' American Hockey League (AHL) affiliate, the Binghamton Senators, on March 26. He recorded three points in three games. On April 2, the Ottawa Senators signed White to a three-year, entry-level contract. He made his NHL debut the following day in a 5–4 loss to the Detroit Red Wings. He made his NHL post-season debut in game six of the Eastern Conference Final against the Pittsburgh Penguins on May 23.

White split his first professional season between Ottawa and Binghamton. On February 6, 2018, he recorded his first career NHL goal in a 5–3 win over the New Jersey Devils. He finished his first season in Ottawa with six points in 21 games. In his first full season with Ottawa, White recorded 14 goals and 41 points in 71 games. On August 21, 2019, the Senators signed White to a six-year, $28.5 million contract extension.

On October 5, 2021, White sustained an upper-body injury five minutes into a pre-season game against the Toronto Maple Leafs after a collision with David Kämpf. He was expected to miss four to six months to recover from shoulder surgery. White later returned in the 2021–22 season to record three goals and 10 points through 24 games.

Having been affected through injury and failing to live up to his contract expectations, on July 5, 2022, White was placed on unconditional waivers by the Senators and upon clearing was bought out from the remaining three-years of his contract. On the opening day of free agency, White was signed to a one-year, $1.2 million contract with the Florida Panthers on July 13, 2022. He finished the season with eight goals and fifteen points in 68 games and was a restricted free agent following its conclusion. However, the Panthers chose not to give him a qualifying offer and instead let White become an unrestricted free agent on July 1, 2023.

White signed a professional tryout (PTO) agreement with the Pittsburgh Penguins on September 9, 2023. He was invited to training camp and was one of five forwards working for the final two spots on the roster after the penultimate round of cuts. On October 7, White signed a one-year deal with the Penguins. However, he was assigned to the Penguins AHL affiliate, the Wilkes-Barre/Scranton Penguins, to start the 2023–24 season. White was limited to 21 games in the AHL due to injuries, scoring five goals and ten points. He was recalled by Pittsburgh on January 13, 2024. He made his Pittsburgh debut that night against the Carolina Hurricanes.

Following an 11-game stint with the Penguins in which he was held pointless, White was claimed off waivers by the Montreal Canadiens on February 22, 2024. He made his debut for the Canadiens that night against the Penguins. White made 17 appearances with the Canadiens and was held without a point for the remainder of the season.

As a free agent, White went initially un-signed before agreeing to a one-year AHL contract with the San Jose Barracuda, the primary affiliate to the San Jose Sharks, on August 13, 2024. Midway through the 2024–25 season, having posted 10 points through 20 appearances with the Barracuda, White was signed for the remainder of the season to a one-year league minimum contract with the San Jose Sharks on January 24, 2025. He signed a one-year contract with the Sharks on July 1, 2025.

On July 30, 2026, White was signed to a one-year, two-way contract by the New Jersey Devils.

== International play ==
Medal record

Men's ice hockey

Representing the United States

World Championships
Bronze medal – third place	2018 Denmark	

World Junior Championships
Gold medal – first place	2017 Canada	
Bronze medal – third place	2016 Finland	

World U18 Championships
Gold medal – first place	2015 Switzerland	

White competed as a member of Team USA at the 2014 IIHF World U17 Championships, where he set a USA record of 18 points in six games. He helped lead Team USA to a Gold medal defeating Canada in the championship game. He was named to the tournament's all-star team. He competed as a member of Team USA at the 2015 IIHF World U18 Championships, where he scored the overtime game-winning goal to defeat Finland in the gold medal game.

White represented Team USA at the 2016 IIHF World Junior Championships, where he helped Team USA win a bronze medal in Helsinki, Finland. In 2017, he returned as a member of Team USA at the 2017 World Junior Ice Hockey Championships, where he scored to tie the game that went to overtime in which USA defeated Canada in the gold medal game.

After the Senators failed to qualify for the 2018 Stanley Cup playoffs, White was named to represent Team USA's 2018 IIHF World Championship roster. The United States claimed the bronze medal in Denmark. On April 19, 2019, White was selected to represent Team USA at the 2019 IIHF World Championship, held in Bratislava and Kosice, Slovakia. Team USA made it to the quarterfinals but were eliminated by Russia 4–3.

== Career statistics ==
=== Regular season and playoffs ===
			Regular season					Playoffs
Season	Team	League	GP	G	A	Pts	PIM	GP	G	A	Pts	PIM
2011–12	Noble and Greenough School	USHS	29	16	28	44	2	—	—	—	—	—
2012–13	Noble and Greenough School	USHS	22	18	14	32	10	—	—	—	—	—
2013–14	U.S. NTDP Juniors	USHL	35	14	14	28	50	—	—	—	—	—
2013–14	U.S. NTDP U17	USDP	47	33	31	64	79	—	—	—	—	—
2013–14	U.S. NTDP U18	USDP	8	1	2	3	4	—	—	—	—	—
2014–15	U.S. NTDP Juniors	USHL	20	4	13	17	10	—	—	—	—	—
2014–15	U.S. NTDP U18	USDP	54	23	31	54	28	—	—	—	—	—
2015–16	Boston College	HE	37	19	24	43	46	—	—	—	—	—
2016–17	Boston College	HE	35	16	17	33	46	—	—	—	—	—
2016–17	Binghamton Senators	AHL	3	1	2	3	2	—	—	—	—	—
2016–17	Ottawa Senators	NHL	2	0	0	0	0	1	0	0	0	0
2017–18	Belleville Senators	AHL	47	11	16	27	43	—	—	—	—	—
2017–18	Ottawa Senators	NHL	21	2	4	6	8	—	—	—	—	—
2018–19	Ottawa Senators	NHL	71	14	27	41	24	—	—	—	—	—
2019–20	Ottawa Senators	NHL	61	7	16	23	39	—	—	—	—	—
2019–20	Belleville Senators	AHL	1	0	2	2	0	—	—	—	—	—
2020–21	Ottawa Senators	NHL	45	10	8	18	16	—	—	—	—	—
2021–22	Ottawa Senators	NHL	24	3	7	10	4	—	—	—	—	—
2022–23	Florida Panthers	NHL	68	8	7	15	12	21	0	2	2	6
2023–24	Wilkes-Barre/Scranton Penguins	AHL	21	5	5	10	10	—	—	—	—	—
2023–24	Pittsburgh Penguins	NHL	11	0	0	0	2	—	—	—	—	—
2023–24	Montreal Canadiens	NHL	17	0	0	0	2	—	—	—	—	—
2024–25	San Jose Barracuda	AHL	48	12	13	25	32	5	1	5	6	2
2024–25	San Jose Sharks	NHL	3	0	0	0	0	—	—	—	—	—
2025–26	San Jose Barracuda	AHL	46	21	27	48	28	2	1	0	1	2
NHL totals			323	44	69	113	107	22	0	2	2	6

=== International ===
Year	Team	Event	Result	GP	G	A	Pts	PIM
2014	United States	U17	1st place, gold medalist(s)	6	10	8	18	4
2015	United States	WJC18	1st place, gold medalist(s)	7	6	3	9	0
2016	United States	WJC	3rd place, bronze medalist(s)	7	3	4	7	4
2017	United States	WJC	1st place, gold medalist(s)	7	7	1	8	4
2018	United States	WC	3rd place, bronze medalist(s)	10	2	1	3	6
2019	United States	WC	7th	8	2	1	3	4
Junior totals				27	26	16	42	12
Senior totals				18	4	2	6	10

== Awards and honors ==
Award	Year	Ref
USHL
CCM/USA Hockey All-American Prospects Game	2014	
College
Hockey East All-Rookie Team	2016	
Hockey East Rookie of the Year	2016	
Hockey East Second All-Star Team	2016	
International
World U18 Championship gold medal	2015	
World Junior Championship gold medal	2017	

Awards and achievements
Preceded by Thomas Chabot	Ottawa Senators first-round draft pick 2015	Succeeded by Logan Brown
Preceded by Jack Eichel	Hockey East Rookie of the Year; 2015–16	Succeeded by Clayton Keller
