= David Bernhardt (ice hockey) =

Swedish ice hockey player

- Born: 1 December 1997 (age 28) Huddinge, Sweden
- Height: 6 ft 3 in (191 cm)
- Weight: 191 lb (87 kg; 13 st 9 lb)
- Position: Defence
- Shoots: Left
- SHL team Former teams: Linköping HC; Djurgårdens IF; Växjö Lakers; SaiPa; HIFK; MoDo Hockey
- NHL draft: 199th overall, 2016; Philadelphia Flyers
- Playing career: 2016–present

David Bernhardt (born 1 December 1997) is a Swedish professional ice hockey defenseman. He is currently playing with Linköping HC of the Swedish Hockey League (SHL). Bernhardt was selected by the Philadelphia Flyers in the seventh round (199th overall) of the 2016 NHL entry draft.

== Playing career ==
Bernhardt made his Swedish Hockey League debut playing with Djurgårdens IF during the 2016–17 SHL season. On 26 November 2016, he agreed to an additional one-year contract extension until 2018 with Djurgården.

During the 2018–19 season, having tallied just 1 assist in 16 games in the final year of his contract with Djurgårdens IF, Bernhardt was released and signed by rival club, Växjö Lakers, to a new three-year contract on 4 January 2019.

After MoDo Hockey demotion to the Allsvenskan, Bernhardt left the club to remain in the SHL, signing a three-year contract with Linköping HC on 9 April 2025.

David's older brother Daniel was also formerly a prospect with the Djurgårdens IF organization, and was drafted by the New York Rangers in 2015.

== Career statistics ==
=== Regular season and playoffs ===
| | | | Regular season | | | | | Playoffs |
| Season | Team | League | GP | G | A | Pts | PIM | GP | G | A | Pts | PIM |
|---|---|---|---|---|---|---|---|---|---|---|---|---|
| 2013–14 | Djurgårdens IF | J20 | 6 | 0 | 0 | 0 | 2 | 2 | 0 | 0 | 0 | 0 |
| 2014–15 | Djurgårdens IF | J20 | 38 | 6 | 9 | 15 | 10 | 7 | 0 | 1 | 1 | 4 |
| 2014–15 | Väsby IK | Div.1 | 1 | 0 | 0 | 0 | 0 | — | — | — | — | — |
| 2015–16 | Djurgårdens IF | J20 | 45 | 10 | 28 | 38 | 30 | 7 | 3 | 3 | 6 | 2 |
| 2016–17 | Djurgårdens IF | J20 | 21 | 9 | 12 | 21 | 28 | 2 | 0 | 1 | 1 | 0 |
| 2016–17 | Djurgårdens IF | SHL | 27 | 2 | 5 | 7 | 4 | — | — | — | — | — |
| 2017–18 | Djurgårdens IF | SHL | 51 | 1 | 10 | 11 | 6 | 2 | 0 | 3 | 3 | 0 |
| 2018–19 | Djurgårdens IF | SHL | 16 | 0 | 1 | 1 | 0 | — | — | — | — | — |
| 2018–19 | Växjö Lakers | SHL | 20 | 3 | 4 | 7 | 4 | 7 | 0 | 1 | 1 | 2 |
| 2019–20 | Växjö Lakers | SHL | 9 | 0 | 0 | 0 | 2 | — | — | — | — | — |
| 2019–20 | SaiPa | Liiga | 33 | 1 | 6 | 7 | 12 | — | — | — | — | — |
| 2020–21 | SaiPa | Liiga | 35 | 3 | 8 | 11 | 6 | — | — | — | — | — |
| 2020–21 | HIFK | Liiga | 10 | 0 | 0 | 0 | 0 | 8 | 0 | 3 | 3 | 0 |
| 2021–22 | MoDo Hockey | Allsv | 52 | 14 | 30 | 44 | 55 | 13 | 4 | 8 | 12 | 10 |
| 2022–23 | MoDo Hockey | Allsv | 52 | 19 | 32 | 51 | 24 | 17 | 10 | 11 | 21 | 4 |
| 2023–24 | MoDo Hockey | SHL | 52 | 3 | 17 | 20 | 16 | — | — | — | — | — |
| 2024–25 | MoDo Hockey | SHL | 51 | 10 | 22 | 32 | 46 | — | — | — | — | — |
| SHL totals | | | 226 | 19 | 59 | 78 | 78 | 9 | 0 | 4 | 4 | 2 |
| Liiga totals | | | 78 | 4 | 14 | 18 | 18 | 8 | 0 | 3 | 3 | 0 |

=== International ===
| Year | Team | Event | Result | GP | G | A | Pts | PIM |
|---|---|---|---|---|---|---|---|---|
| 2017 | Sweden | WJC | 4th | 7 | 0 | 3 | 3 | 4 |
| Junior totals | | | | 7 | 0 | 3 | 3 | 4 |
