= Marek Sloboda =

Slovak professional ice hockey player (born 1997)

- Born: 1 November 1997 (age 27); Bratislava, Slovakia
- Height: 182 cm (6 ft 0 in)
- Weight: 82 kg (181 lb; 12 st 13 lb)
- Position: Left wing
- Shoots: Left
- Slovak team Former teams: HK Dukla Trenčín; HC Slovan Bratislava; Motor České Budějovice; HK Orange 20; Bratislava Capitals; HC Nové Zámky; HC '05 Banská Bystrica; HC Baník Sokolov; HC ZUBR Přerov
- Playing career: 2016–present

Marek Sloboda (born 1 November 1997) is a Slovak professional ice hockey player who currently playing for HK Dukla Trenčín of the Slovak Extraliga.

== Career statistics ==
=== Regular season and playoffs ===
			Regular season					Playoffs
Season	Team	League	GP	G	A	Pts	PIM	GP	G	A	Pts	PIM
2014–15	Team Slovakia U18	Slovak.1	41	5	4	9	12	—	—	—	—	—
2014–15	HC Slovan Bratislava	Slovak-Jr.	2	2	0	2	0	—	—	—	—	—
2015–16	Motor České Budějovice	Czech-Jr.	41	13	8	21	78	3	1	0	1	4
2015–16	Motor České Budějovice	Czech.1	—	—	—	—	—	2	0	0	0	0
2016–17	HK Orange 20	Slovak	15	3	1	4	6	—	—	—	—	—
2016–17	HK Orange 20	Slovak.1	7	0	2	2	4	—	—	—	—	—
2016–17	Motor České Budějovice	Czech.1	2	0	1	1	2	—	—	—	—	—
2017–18	HC Slovan Bratislava	KHL	25	1	0	1	4	—	—	—	—	—
2017–18	HC Bratislava	Slovak.1	15	6	7	13	34	—	—	—	—	—
2018–19	HC Slovan Bratislava	KHL	35	3	0	3	6	—	—	—	—	—
2018–19	HC Nové Zámky	Slovak	2	0	0	0	0	—	—	—	—	—
2019–20	HC Slovan Bratislava	Slovak	48	2	7	9	36	—	—	—	—	—
2020–21	HC '05 Banská Bystrica	Slovak	36	3	4	7	10	1	0	0	0	0
KHL totals			60	4	0	4	10	—	—	—	—	—
Slovak totals			101	8	12	20	52	1	0	0	0	0

=== International ===
Year	Team	Event	Result	GP	G	A	Pts	PIM
2014	Slovakia	IH18	8th	1	0	0	0	2
2015	Slovakia	WJC18	7th	5	0	0	0	2
2017	Slovakia	WJC	8th	5	1	2	3	2
Junior totals				11	1	2	3	6
