= Mikhail Vorobyev (ice hockey) =

Russian ice hockey player (born 1997)

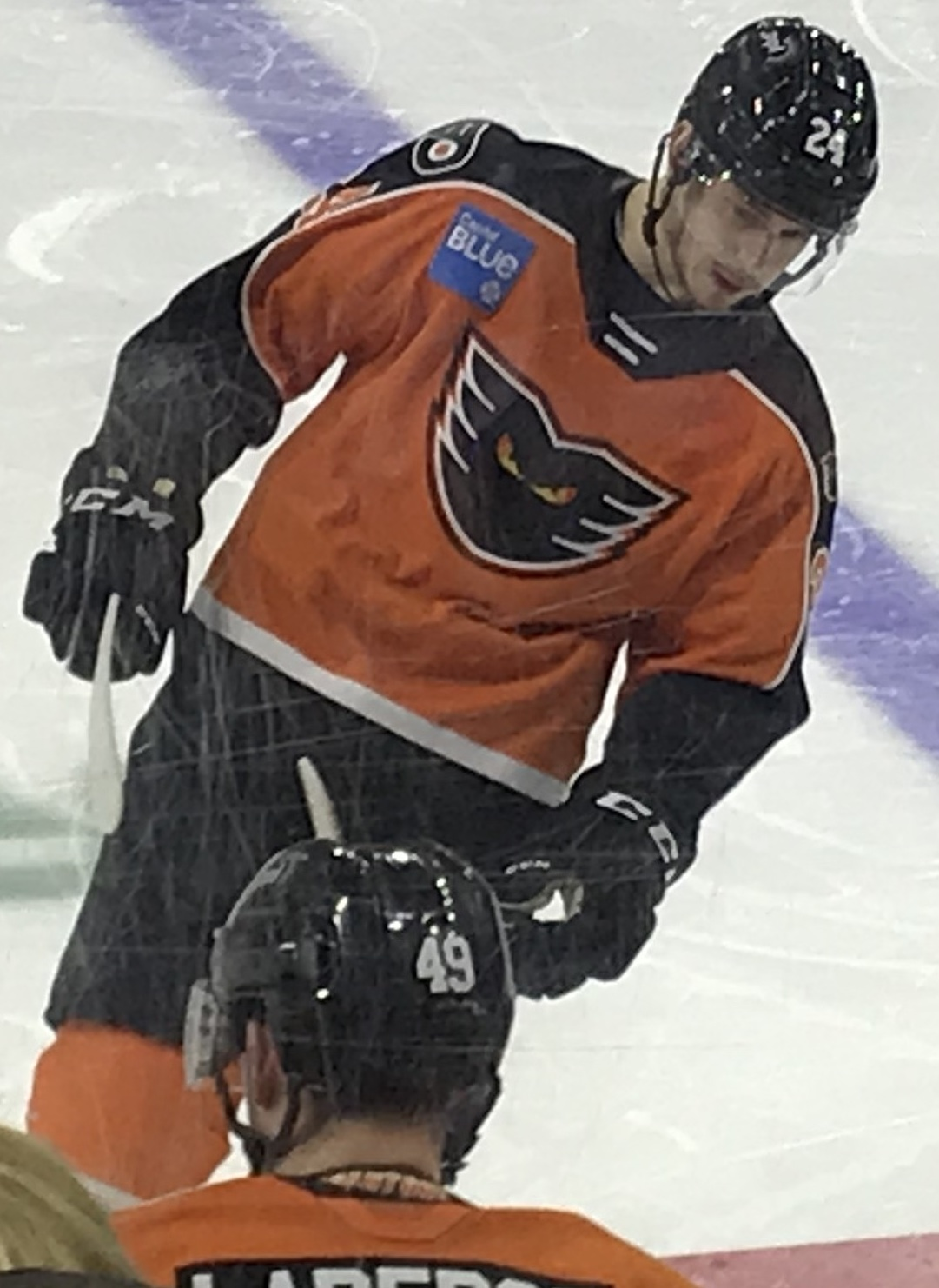
- Mikhail Vorobyev on January 15, 2020
- Born: 5 January 1997 (age 29) Salavat, Russia
- Height: 6 ft 2 in (188 cm)
- Weight: 187 lb (85 kg; 13 st 5 lb)
- Position: Centre
- Shoots: Left
- KHL team Former teams: Torpedo Nizhny Novgorod; Salavat Yulaev Ufa; Philadelphia Flyers; SKA Saint Petersburg
- NHL draft: 104th overall, 2015; Philadelphia Flyers
- Playing career: 2015–present

Mikhail Sergeyevich Vorobyev (Russian: Михаил Сергеевич Воробьёв; born 5 January 1997) is a Russian professional ice hockey forward currently playing for Torpedo Nizhny Novgorod of the Kontinental Hockey League (KHL). He was selected 104th overall in the 2015 NHL entry draft by the Philadelphia Flyers.

== Playing career ==
Vorobyev made his Kontinental Hockey League (KHL) debut playing with Salavat Yulaev Ufa during the 2015–16 KHL season.

On 27 April 2017 Vorobyev signed a three-year, entry-level contract with Philadelphia Flyers. Following the Flyers training camp before the 2017–18 season, Vorobyov was assigned to the Flyers American Hockey League affiliate, the Lehigh Valley Phantoms.

After playing one season with the Phantoms, Vorobyev made the Flyers' 2018–19 season-opening night roster out of training camp. He made his NHL debut on 4 October 2018, where he earned one assist in a 5–2 win over the Vegas Golden Knights. Vorobyev recorded his first career NHL goal in 5–2 loss to the Colorado Avalanche on 7 October 2018. During the second period Avalanche's goalie, Semyon Varlamov, was crashed into by a teammate, allowing Vorobyev to shoot the puck into the empty net and tie the game 2–2.

Vorobyev played three seasons within the Flyers organization before leaving as an impending restricted free agent to return to his original Russian club, Salavat Yulaev Ufa of the KHL. He agreed to a three-year contract starting in the 2020–21 season on 30 June 2020.

Approaching the 2021–22 season, Vorobyev was traded by Salavat Yulaev to SKA Saint Petersburg in exchange for Dinar Khafizullin on 28 August 2021.

On 6 March 2024, Vorobyev's signing rights were traded to the Vegas Golden Knights, as part of a three-team trade involving the Flyers and Calgary Flames that sent Noah Hanifin to Vegas.

After five seasons with Saint Petersburg, Vorobyev left as a free agent and was signed to a two-year contract with fellow KHL club, Torpedo Nizhny Novgorod, on 1 June 2026.

== Career statistics ==
=== Regular season and playoffs ===
			Regular season					Playoffs
Season	Team	League	GP	G	A	Pts	PIM	GP	G	A	Pts	PIM
2013–14	Tolpar Ufa	MHL	4	0	3	3	0	—	—	—	—	—
2014–15	Tolpar Ufa	MHL	39	8	12	20	40	8	3	0	3	2
2015–16	Tolpar Ufa	MHL	21	6	17	23	28	—	—	—	—	—
2015–16	Salavat Yulaev Ufa	KHL	28	2	1	3	14	1	0	0	0	0
2016–17	Salavat Yulaev Ufa	KHL	44	3	8	11	18	5	0	0	0	4
2017–18	Lehigh Valley Phantoms	AHL	58	9	20	29	14	9	1	1	2	20
2018–19	Philadelphia Flyers	NHL	15	1	1	2	2	—	—	—	—	—
2018–19	Lehigh Valley Phantoms	AHL	42	7	19	26	36	—	—	—	—	—
2019–20	Lehigh Valley Phantoms	AHL	45	12	16	28	34	—	—	—	—	—
2019–20	Philadelphia Flyers	NHL	20	1	2	3	6	—	—	—	—	—
2020–21	Salavat Yulaev Ufa	KHL	33	5	8	13	18	—	—	—	—	—
2021–22	SKA Saint Petersburg	KHL	41	6	13	19	20	16	1	7	8	2
2022–23	SKA Saint Petersburg	KHL	59	13	26	39	26	14	3	3	6	6
2023–24	SKA Saint Petersburg	KHL	61	17	24	41	36	10	2	3	5	0
2024–25	SKA Saint Petersburg	KHL	49	7	16	23	10	4	0	0	0	6
2025–26	SKA Saint Petersburg	KHL	48	7	26	33	14	5	0	0	0	4
KHL totals			363	60	122	182	156	55	6	13	19	22
NHL totals			35	2	3	5	8	—	—	—	—	—

Medal record

Representing Russia

Ice hockey

IIHF World Junior Championship
Bronze medal – third place	2017 Canada	

=== International ===
Year	Team	Event	Result	GP	G	A	Pts	PIM
2015	Russia	WJC18	5th	5	1	3	4	2
2017	Russia	WJC	3rd place, bronze medalist(s)	7	0	10	10	4
Junior totals				12	1	13	14	6
