= Filip Hronek =

Czech ice hockey player (born 1997)

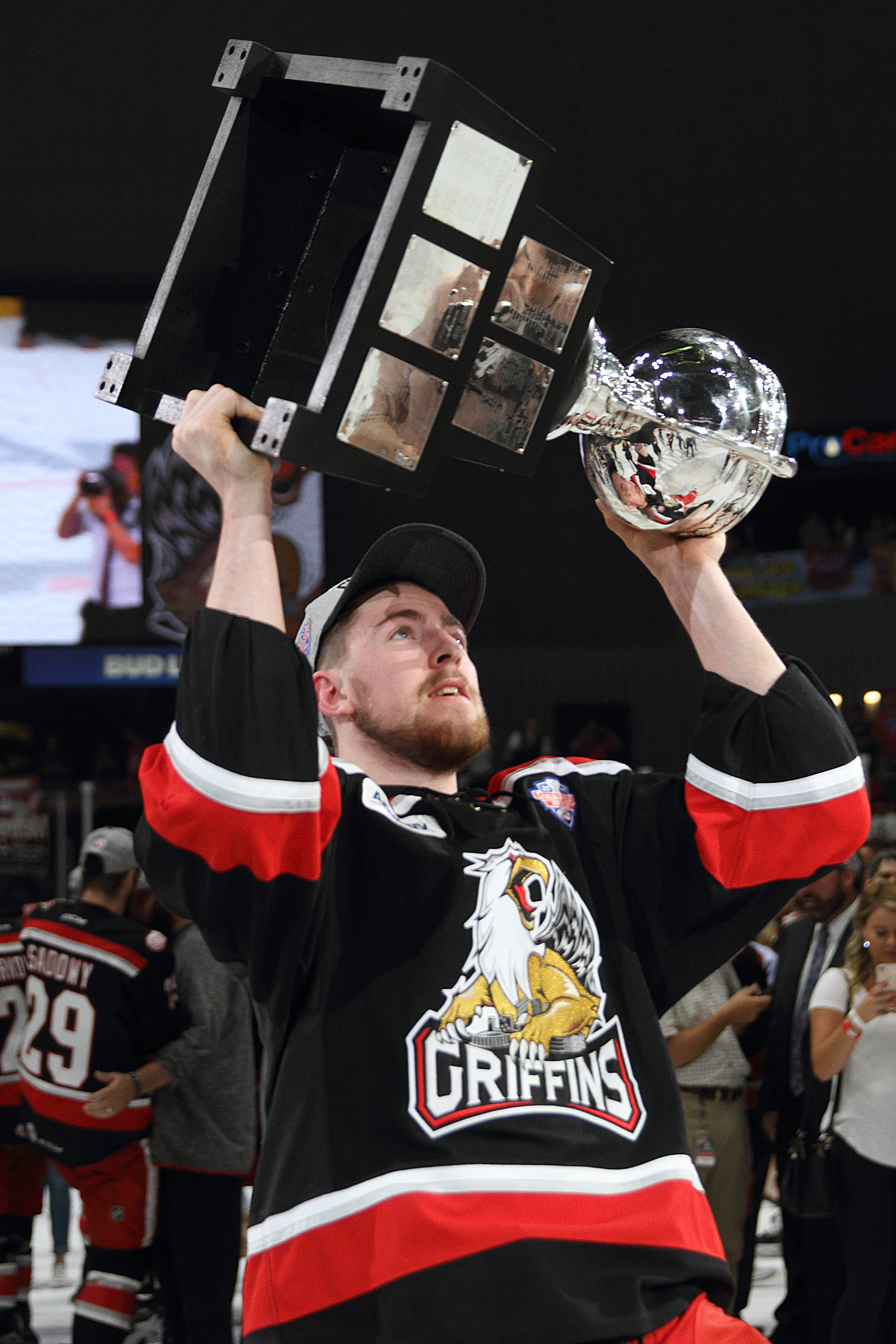
- Hronek winning the Calder Cup with the Grand Rapids Griffins in 2017
- Born: 2 November 1997 (age 28) Hradec Králové, Czech Republic
- Height: 6 ft 0 in (183 cm)
- Weight: 190 lb (86 kg; 13 st 8 lb)
- Position: Defence
- Shoots: Right
- NHL team Former teams: Vancouver Canucks; Mountfield HK; Detroit Red Wings
- National team: Czech Republic
- NHL draft: 53rd overall, 2016; Detroit Red Wings
- Playing career: 2015–present

Filip Hronek (born 2 November 1997) is a Czech professional ice hockey player who is a defenceman and alternate captain for the Vancouver Canucks of the National Hockey League (NHL). Hronek previously played in the NHL for the Detroit Red Wings. He was drafted 53rd overall by the Red Wings in the 2016 NHL entry draft.

== Playing career ==
=== Czech Republic ===
Hronek made his Czech Extraliga debut with Mountfield HK during the 2014–15 season. During the 2015–16 season, he recorded no goals and four assists in 40 games.

=== North America ===
==== Saginaw Spirit and Detroit Red Wings ====
On 14 July 2016, the Detroit Red Wings signed Hronek to a three-year, entry-level contract. Following the completion of the 2016–17 OHL season, Hronek was assigned to the Grand Rapids Griffins on 22 March 2017. In his first season in North America, Hronek recorded 14 goals and 47 assists in 59 games for the Saginaw Spirit. He was tied for fourth among OHL defenceman in scoring with 61 points, and was among the team's leaders with 47 assists (1st), 21 power play points (1st), 14 goals (4th) and 235 shots (2nd) and was named the Spirits' Best Defenceman, and Most Valuable Player.

He made his NHL debut for the Red Wings on 4 October 2018. On 13 October 2018, Hronek scored his first career NHL goal against Tuukka Rask of the Boston Bruins. During the 2018–19 season, Hronek recorded five goals and 18 assists in 46 games for the Red Wings. His 23 points led all Red Wings rookies, and ranked fourth in NHL scoring by a rookie defenceman. He finished the season on a four-game point streak, the longest point streak by a Red Wings rookie defenceman since 1991–92, and posted seven total points in his last six games. Following the completion of the Red Wings' season, he was reassigned to the Griffins. Hronek was named the 2019 Red Wings Rookie of the Year in voting conducted by Detroit Sports Media.

On 28 August 2020, having returned to his native Czech Republic through the off-season and during the COVID-19 pandemic, Hronek joined former club, Mountfield HK of the ELH on loan until the commencement of the delayed 2020–21 North American season.

On 3 September 2021, Hronek signed a three-year, $13.2 million contract with the Red Wings.

==== Vancouver Canucks ====
On 1 March 2023, Hronek was traded to the Vancouver Canucks, along with a fourth-round pick in the 2023 NHL entry draft, in exchange for a first-round and second-round pick in the 2023 NHL entry draft. Prior to being traded, Hronek appeared in 60 games with the Red Wings during the 2022–23 season, where he recorded nine goals, 29 assists, four power play goals, 16 power play points, 122 shots and 21:32 average time on ice.

In his first full season with the Canucks, Hronek and his defensive partner Quinn Hughes played important roles in helping the team find early success. On 15 November, Hronek recorded his first goal with the team and tied the franchise record for longest point streak by a Canuck defenceman. At the time, he had accumulated one goal and 13 assists for 14 points. By the end of November, Hronek and Hughes led all league defencemen pairs with 59 combined points. Hronek continued to set new Canucks records as he became the fifth fastest player in Canucks history to record 30 assists since being acquired via a trade.

On 18 June 2024, Canucks General Manager Patrik Allvin announced that Hronek had signed an eight-year, $58 million contract extension to remain with the team through 2032.

== International play ==
Medal record

Men's ice hockey

Representing the Czech Republic

World Championships
Bronze medal – third place	2022 Finland	

Hronek captained the Czech Republic junior team at the 2017 World Junior Championships, where he was the team's leading defenceman with two goals and two assists in five games.

Hronek also represented the Czech Republic senior team in four World Championships. At the 2019 World Championship, Hronek led the tournament in points for a defenceman, was selected for the tournament All-Star Team, and was named the Best Defenceman.

== Career statistics ==
=== Regular season and playoffs ===
			Regular season					Playoffs
Season	Team	League	GP	G	A	Pts	PIM	GP	G	A	Pts	PIM
2013–14	Mountfield HK	CZE U18	43	8	7	15	56	4	0	1	1	2
2014–15	Mountfield HK	CZE U18	33	5	19	24	108	9	4	5	9	35
2014–15	Mountfield HK	CZE.2 U20	19	4	13	17	20	1	0	0	0	0
2014–15	Mountfield HK	ELH	1	0	0	0	2	—	—	—	—	—
2015–16	Mountfield HK	CZE U20	13	4	12	16	12	10	4	5	9	28
2015–16	Mountfield HK	ELH	40	0	4	4	22	—	—	—	—	—
2015–16	HC Stadion Litoměřice	CZE.2	12	2	2	4	18	—	—	—	—	—
2016–17	Saginaw Spirit	OHL	59	14	47	61	60	—	—	—	—	—
2016–17	Grand Rapids Griffins	AHL	10	1	1	2	4	2	0	0	0	6
2017–18	Grand Rapids Griffins	AHL	67	11	28	39	44	5	0	1	1	14
2018–19	Grand Rapids Griffins	AHL	31	7	17	24	45	5	0	3	3	28
2018–19	Detroit Red Wings	NHL	46	5	18	23	30	—	—	—	—	—
2019–20	Detroit Red Wings	NHL	65	9	22	31	46	—	—	—	—	—
2020–21	Mountfield HK	ELH	22	10	13	23	18	—	—	—	—	—
2020–21	Detroit Red Wings	NHL	56	2	24	26	16	—	—	—	—	—
2021–22	Detroit Red Wings	NHL	78	5	33	38	36	—	—	—	—	—
2022–23	Detroit Red Wings	NHL	60	9	29	38	34	—	—	—	—	—
2022–23	Vancouver Canucks	NHL	4	0	1	1	0	—	—	—	—	—
2023–24	Vancouver Canucks	NHL	81	5	43	48	38	13	1	1	2	6
2024–25	Vancouver Canucks	NHL	61	5	28	33	40	—	—	—	—	—
2025–26	Vancouver Canucks	NHL	82	8	41	49	33	—	—	—	—	—
NHL totals			533	48	239	287	273	13	1	1	2	6

=== International ===
Year	Team	Event	Result	GP	G	A	Pts	PIM
2015	Czech Republic	U18	6th	5	0	3	3	6
2016	Czech Republic	WJC	5th	5	0	2	2	4
2017	Czech Republic	WJC	6th	5	2	2	4	10
2018	Czech Republic	WC	7th	8	1	2	3	2
2019	Czech Republic	WC	4th	10	3	8	11	22
2021	Czech Republic	WC	7th	7	1	3	4	4
2022	Czechia	WC	3rd place, bronze medalist(s)	10	0	2	2	0
2025	Czechia	WC	6th	8	0	6	6	4
2026	Czechia	OG	8th	5	0	5	5	0
2026	Czechia	WC	5th	8	1	2	3	2
Junior totals				15	2	7	9	20
Senior totals				56	6	28	34	34

== Awards and honours ==
Award	Year	Ref
AHL
Calder Cup champion	2017	
AHL All-Rookie Team	2018	
International
WC All-Star Team	2019	
Best Defenceman	2019	
