= Darcy Burchell =

Canadian ice hockey referee

- Occupation: Ice hockey referee

Darcy Burchell is a Canadian ice hockey referee.

On September 1, 2011, Burchell was signed by the National Hockey League (NHL). He made his NHL debut on January 29, 2013, officiating a match-up between the Dallas Stars and Detroit Red Wings.

He was not re-hired by the NHL for the 2015-16 season, but continues to officiate in the American Hockey League.
