= Alexander Polunin =

Russian ice hockey player

- Born: 25 May 1997 (age 29) Moscow, Russia
- Height: 175 cm (5 ft 9 in)
- Weight: 78 kg (172 lb; 12 st 4 lb)
- Position: Left wing
- Shoots: Left
- KHL team Former teams: Lokomotiv Yaroslavl; HC Sochi; Amur Khabarovsk
- Playing career: 2015–present

Alexander Andreyevich Polunin (Russian: Александр Андреевич Полунин; born 25 May 1997) is a Russian professional ice hockey forward who currently plays for Lokomotiv Yaroslavl of the Kontinental Hockey League (KHL).

== Playing career ==
He made his professional debut with Lokomotiv Yaroslavl in the 2015–16 season.

On 21 July 2020, Polunin was traded by Lokomotiv to Amur Khabarovsk in exchange for the rights to North American Ryan Strome. After recording career highs of 11 goals and 26 points through 60 games of the 2020–21 season with Amur Khabarovsk, Polunin was returned to Lokomotiv on 1 June 2021.

== Awards and honors ==
Award	Year
KHL
Gagarin Cup champion	2025, 2026
