= 2012–13 OHL season =

- League: Ontario Hockey League
- Sport: Hockey
- Duration: Preseason; September 2012; Regular season September 2012 – March 2013; Playoffs; March 2013 – May 2013
- Teams: 20
- TV partner(s): Rogers TV, TVCogeco

Draft
- Top draft pick: Connor McDavid
- Picked by: Erie Otters

Regular season
- Hamilton Spectator Trophy: London Knights (6)
- Season MVP: Vincent Trocheck (Saginaw/Plymouth)
- Top scorer: Vincent Trocheck (Saginaw/PLymouth)

Playoffs
- Playoffs MVP: Bo Horvat (Knights)
- Finals champions: London Knights (3)
- Runners-up: Barrie Colts

OHL seasons
- 2011–12 2013–14

2012–13 CHL season
- League: Canadian Hockey League
- Sport: Hockey
- Duration: OHL; September 2012 – March 2013; QMJHL; September 2012 – March 2013; WHL; September 2012 – March 2013
- Teams: 60
- TV partner(s): RDS; Rogers Sportsnet; Rogers TV; Shaw TV
- Season MVP: Jonathan Drouin (Halifax Mooseheads) (QMHL)
- Top scorer: Brendan Leipsic (Portland Winterhawks) (WHL)

Memorial Cup
- Finals champions: Halifax Mooseheads (QMJHL)
- Runners-up: Portland Winterhawks (WHL)

The 2012–13 OHL season was the 33rd season of the Ontario Hockey League. The Mississauga St. Michael's Majors were sold during the off-season. As part of the sale, the "St. Michael's Majors" name was returned to St. Michael's College School. The new name of the team will be the Mississauga Steelheads. The Brampton Battalion announced during the season that this would be their last season in Brampton and will relocate to North Bay, Ontario for the 2013–14 OHL season. Twenty teams played 68 games each during the regular season schedule, which began in September 2012 and ended in March 2013. The London Knights won their second consecutive J. Ross Robertson Cup and third in franchise history, and with it a berth in the 2013 Memorial Cup hosted by the Saskatoon Blades of the WHL.

== Regular season ==
=== Final standings ===
Note: DIV = Division; GP = Games played; W = Wins; L = Losses; OTL = Overtime losses; SL = Shootout losses; GF = Goals for; GA = Goals against; PTS = Points; x = clinched playoff berth; y = clinched division title; z = clinched conference title

=== Eastern conference ===
Rank	Team	DIV	GP	W	L	OTL	SL	PTS	GF	GA
1	z-Belleville Bulls	East	68	44	16	5	3	96	228	167
2	y-Barrie Colts	Central	68	44	20	2	2	92	245	185
3	x-Oshawa Generals	East	68	42	22	1	3	88	235	192
4	x-Brampton Battalion	Central	68	34	25	3	6	77	193	190
5	x-Sudbury Wolves	Central	68	29	27	5	7	70	214	234
6	x-Niagara IceDogs	Central	68	30	34	2	2	64	227	250
7	x-Kingston Frontenacs	East	68	27	35	3	3	60	217	273
8	x-Mississauga Steelheads	Central	68	26	34	0	8	60	179	221
9	Peterborough Petes	East	68	26	35	3	4	59	202	254
10	Ottawa 67's	East	68	16	46	0	6	38	208	323

=== Western conference ===
Rank	Team	DIV	GP	W	L	OTL	SL	PTS	GF	GA
1	z-London Knights	Midwest	68	50	13	2	3	105	279	180
2	y-Plymouth Whalers	West	68	42	17	5	4	93	292	202
3	x-Owen Sound Attack	Midwest	68	44	18	1	5	94	231	165
4	x-Kitchener Rangers	Midwest	68	39	20	1	8	87	216	185
5	x-Guelph Storm	Midwest	68	39	23	2	4	84	253	210
6	x-Sault Ste. Marie Greyhounds	West	68	36	26	3	3	78	262	257
7	x-Sarnia Sting	West	68	35	28	1	4	75	247	254
8	x-Saginaw Spirit	West	68	32	29	4	3	71	250	264
9	Windsor Spitfires	West	68	26	33	3	6	61	212	278
10	Erie Otters	Midwest	68	19	40	4	5	47	206	312

=== Scoring leaders ===
Note: GP = Games played; G = Goals; A = Assists; Pts = Points; PIM = Penalty minutes

Player	Team	GP	G	A	Pts	PIM
Vincent Trocheck	Saginaw/Plymouth	63	50	59	109	58
Charlie Sarault	Sarnia Sting	68	22	86	108	28
Nick Cousins	Sault Ste. Marie Greyhounds	64	27	76	103	83
Eric Locke	Saginaw Spirit	68	44	53	97	84
Reid Boucher	Sarnia Sting	68	62	33	95	53
Ryan Strome	Niagara IceDogs	53	34	60	94	59
Garret Ross	Saginaw Spirit	61	44	46	90	114
Kerby Rychel	Windsor Spitfires	68	40	47	87	94
Max Domi	London Knights	64	39	48	87	71
Boone Jenner	Oshawa Generals	56	45	37	82	58

=== Leading goaltenders ===
Note: GP = Games played; Mins = Minutes played; W = Wins; L = Losses: OTL = Overtime losses; SL = Shootout losses; GA = Goals Allowed; SO = Shutouts; GAA = Goals against average

Player	Team	GP	Mins	W	L	OTL	SL	GA	SO	Sv%	GAA
Malcolm Subban	Belleville Bulls	46	2695	29	11	4	0	96	5	0.934	2.14
Jordan Binnington	Owen Sound Attack	50	3011	32	12	1	5	109	7	0.932	2.17
Mathias Niederberger	Barrie Colts	56	3128	35	12	2	1	122	4	0.933	2.34
Matěj Machovský	Brampton Battalion	52	3023	25	19	3	4	127	3	0.910	2.52
Franky Palazzese	Kitchener/Sudbury	43	2533	17	15	3	6	110	2	0.922	2.61

== Playoffs ==
Conference quarterfinals	Conference semifinals
1	Belleville	4
8	Mississauga	2
1	Belleville	4
5	Sudbury	0
2	Barrie	4
7	Kingston	0
Eastern conference
3	Oshawa	4
6	Niagara	1
2	Barrie	4
3	Oshawa	0
4	Brampton	1
5	Sudbury	4
Note: Pairings are re-seeded after the first round.
1	London	4
8	Saginaw	0
1	London	4
4	Kitchener	1
2	Plymouth	4
7	Sarnia	0
Western conference
3	Owen Sound	4
6	Sault Ste. Marie	2
2	Plymouth	4
3	Owen Sound	2
4	Kitchener	4
5	Guelph	1

Conference finals
1	Belleville	3
2	Barrie	4
1	London	4
2	Plymouth	1

Finals
E2	Barrie	3
W1	London	4

=== Conference quarterfinals ===
==== Eastern conference quarterfinals ====
===== (1) Belleville Bulls vs. (8) Mississauga Steelheads =====
March 21	Belleville Bulls	8 – 1	Mississauga Steelheads	Yardmen Arena	Recap
Scott Simmonds (1) - 3:46; Garrett Hooey (1) - 4:26; Brendan Gaunce (1) - 18:29		First period	No scoring
Jordan Subban (1) - 17:23; Brendan Gaunce (2) - pp - 18:56		Second period	11:09 - Dylan DeMelo (1)
Jake Cardwell (1) - 9:59; Alan Quine (1) - 12:43; Carter Sandlak (1) - 13:20		Third period	No scoring
Malcolm Subban (25 saves / 26 shots)		Goalie stats	Spencer Martin (28 saves / 36 shots)

March 23	Belleville Bulls	4 – 1	Mississauga Steelheads	Yardmen Arena	Recap
2:24 - pp - Tyler Graovac (1); 15:59 - Joseph Cramarossa (1)		First period	Spenser Cobbold (1) - 13:34
16:01 - Carter Sandlak (2)		Second period	No scoring
3:31 - Jake Cardwell (2)		Third period	No scoring
Malcolm Subban (29 saves / 30 shots)		Goalie stats	Tyson Teichmann (37 saves / 41 shots)

March 24	Mississauga Steelheads	2 – 1	Belleville Bulls	Hershey Centre	Recap
19:34 - Damian Bourne (1)		First period	Tyler Graovac (2) - 3:36
No scoring		Second period	No scoring
19:08 - pp - Josh Burnside (1)		Third period	No scoring
Tyson Teichmann (31 saves / 32 shots)		Goalie stats	Malcolm Subban (23 saves / 25 shots)

March 26	Mississauga Steelheads	5 – 2	Belleville Bulls	Hershey Centre	Recap
No scoring		First period	Joseph Cramarossa (2) - 0:11
4:08 - Dylan Smoskowitz (1); 8:57 - Riley Brace (1); 16:31 - pp - Dylan Smoskowitz (2)		Second period	Jake Cardwell (3) - pp - 1:27
16:35 - pp - Josh Burnside (2); 18:56 - en - Andres Kopstals (1)		Third period	No scoring
Tyson Teichmann (25 saves / 27 shots)		Goalie stats	Malcolm Subban (16 saves / 20 shots)

March 30	Belleville Bulls	5 – 0	Mississauga Steelheads	Yardmen Arena	Recap
18:02 - Scott Simmonds (2); 19:59 - Brendan Gaunce (3)		First period	No scoring
4:36 - Alan Quine (2); 10:08 - Austen Brassard (1)		Second period	No scoring
2:04 - Stephen Silas (1)		Third period	No scoring
Malcolm Subban (29 saves / 29 shots)		Goalie stats	Tyson Teichmann (14 saves / 18 shots); Spencer Martin (9 saves / 10 shots)

April 1	Mississauga Steelheads	1 – 3	Belleville Bulls	Hershey Centre	Recap
No scoring		First period	Alan Quine (3) - 12:38
No scoring		Second period	Daniil Zharkov (1) - 4:55
4:06 - pp - Eric Diodati (1)		Third period	Carter Sandlak (3) - en - 19:37
Tyson Teichmann (24 saves / 26 shots)		Goalie stats	Malcolm Subban (31 saves / 32 shots)

Belleville wins series 4 – 2

===== (2) Barrie Colts vs. (7) Kingston Frontenacs =====
March 21	Barrie Colts	3 – 1	Kingston Frontenacs	Barrie Molson Centre	Recap
No scoring		First period	Ryan Kujawinski (1) - 1:09
0:58 - Steven Beyers (1); 3:55 - pp - Mark Scheifele (1)		Second period	No scoring
19:14 - en - Anthony Camara (1)		Third period	No scoring
Mathias Niederberger (33 saves / 34 shots)		Goalie stats	Mike Morrison (41 saves / 43 shots)

March 23	Barrie Colts	7 – 4	Kingston Frontenacs	Barrie Molson Centre	Recap
0:17 - Anthony Camara (2); 1:08 - Mitchell Theoret (1)		First period	Spencer Watson (1) - pp - 14:25
3:49 - Anthony Camara (3); 9:34 - pp - Mark Scheifele (2); 10:23 - Andreas Athanasiou (1); 12:33 - Devon Rymarchuk (1)		Second period	Henri Ikonen (1) - pp - 18:23
11:34 - pp - Steven Beyers (2)		Third period	Cody Alcock (1) - pp - 5:18
Mathias Niederberger (41 saves / 45 shots)		Goalie stats	Mike Morrison (15 saves / 20 shots); Colin Furlong (10 saves / 12 shots)

March 25	Kingston Frontenacs	2 – 4	Barrie Colts	K-Rock Centre	Recap
No scoring		First period	No scoring
5:44 - Mikko Vainonen (2); 17:23 - Ryan Kujawinski (2)		Second period	Mitchell Theoret (2) - 1:21
No scoring		Third period	Andreas Athanasiou (2) - 16:02; Mark Scheifele (3) - 18:38; Mitchell Theoret (3) - en - 19:07
Mike Morrison (26 saves / 29 shots)		Goalie stats	Mathias Niederberger (23 saves / 25 shots)

March 27	Kingston Frontenacs	2 – 8	Barrie Colts	K-Rock Centre	Recap
No scoring		First period	Mitchell Theoret (4) - 0:10; Erik Bradford (1) - 4:26; Mark Scheifele (4) - 16:12; Andreas Athanasiou (3) - pp - 18:13
No scoring		Second period	Andreas Athanasiou (4) - 11:10
1:04 - Darcy Greenaway (1); 1:24 - Darcy Greenaway (2)		Third period	Mitchell Theoret (5) - 9:16; Aaron Ekblad (1) - pp - 9:57; Cody Brown (1) - 19:00
Mike Morrison (17 saves / 23 shots)		Goalie stats	Mathias Niederberger (35 saves / 37 shots)

Barrie wins series 4 – 0

===== (3) Oshawa Generals vs. (6) Niagara IceDogs =====
March 22	Oshawa Generals	5 – 2	Niagara IceDogs	General Motors Centre	Recap
11:56 - Lucas Lessio (1); 13:11 - Michael Dal Colle (1)		First period	Ryan Strome (1) - 1:51
1:30 - Scott Laughton (1)		Second period	Carter Verhaeghe (1) - pp - 9:22
10:52 - Bradley Latour (1); 19:21 - en - Scott Laughton (2)		Third period	No scoring
Daniel Altshuller (17 saves / 19 shots)		Goalie stats	Christopher Festarini (27 saves / 31 shots)

March 24	Oshawa Generals	4 – 3	Niagara IceDogs	General Motors Centre	Recap
3:17 - Scott Laughton (3); 14:17 - Scott Sabourin (1); 19:37 - Josh Brown (1)		First period	Brendan Perlini (1) - 18:46
9:07 - Scott Sabourin (2)		Second period	Ben Hughes (1) - 12:15; Jordan Maletta (1) - pp - 16:40
No scoring		Third period	No scoring
Daniel Altshuller (23 saves / 26 shots)		Goalie stats	Christopher Festarini (34 saves / 38 shots)

March 26	Niagara IceDogs	4 – 2	Oshawa Generals	Gatorade Garden City Complex	Recap
16:17 - Steven Shipley (1)		First period	No scoring
1:26 - Steven Shipley (2); 9:53 - Anthony DiFruscia (1)		Second period	No scoring
4:25 - Brett Ritchie (1)		Third period	Cole Cassels (1) - 3:42; Scott Laughton (4) - 13:34
Christopher Festarini (40 saves / 42 shots)		Goalie stats	Daniel Altshuller (31 saves / 35 shots)

March 28	Niagara IceDogs	1 – 4	Oshawa Generals	Gatorade Garden City Complex	Recap
No scoring		First period	No scoring
1:13 - Anthony DiFruscia (2)		Second period	Scott Laughton (5) - sh - 3:49; Bradley Latour (2) - 13:17; Scott Laughton (6) - 18:35
No scoring		Third period	Matt Petgrave (1) - en - 18:35
Christopher Festarini (23 saves / 26 shots)		Goalie stats	Daniel Altshuller (28 saves / 29 shots)

March 29	Oshawa Generals	3 – 2	Niagara IceDogs	General Motors Centre	Recap
9:38 - pp - Boone Jenner (1); 19:24 - Boone Jenner (2)		First period	Ryan Strome (2) - pp - 18:59
6:00 - Bradley Latour (3)		Second period	Carter Verhaeghe (2) - 18:15
No scoring		Third period	No scoring
Daniel Altshuller (18 saves / 20 shots)		Goalie stats	Christopher Festarini (32 saves / 35 shots)

Oshawa wins series 4 – 1

===== (4) Brampton Battalion vs. (5) Sudbury Wolves =====
March 21	Brampton Battalion	4 – 1	Sudbury Wolves	Powerade Centre	Recap
3:20 - pp - Matt MacLeod (1)		First period	No scoring
0:41 - Barclay Goodrow (1); 18:03 - pp - Dylan Blujus (1)		Second period	Matt Schmalz (1) - 2:05
7:33 - Francis Menard (1)		Third period	No scoring
Matěj Machovský (17 saves / 18 shots)		Goalie stats	Franky Palazzese (23 saves / 27 shots)

March 24	Brampton Battalion	4 – 5	Sudbury Wolves	Powerade Centre	Recap
6:47 - Barclay Goodrow (2); 16:04 - pp - Patrik Machač (1)		First period	Charlie Dodero (1) - pp - 2:52; Michael Kantor (1) - pp - 2:57; Nicholas Baptiste (1) - pp - 5:41
10:31 - Blake Clarke (1); 15:23 - pp - Brenden Miller (1)		Second period	Jacob Harris (1) - 6:47
No scoring		Third period	Dominik Kubalík (1) - 8:27
Matěj Machovský (12 saves / 17 shots)		Goalie stats	Franky Palazzese (30 saves / 34 shots)

March 26	Sudbury Wolves	3 – 1	Brampton Battalion	Sudbury Community Arena	Recap
No scoring		First period	Blake Clarke (2) - 4:19
19:07 - Mathew Campagna (1)		Second period	No scoring
5:01 - Dominik Kubalík (2); 18:53 - en - Nathan Pancel (1)		Third period	No scoring
Franky Palazzese (39 saves / 40 shots)		Goalie stats	Matěj Machovský (10 saves / 12 shots)

March 28	Sudbury Wolves	5 – 4	OT	Brampton Battalion	Sudbury Community Arena	Recap
5:48 - Nicholas Baptiste (2); 14:00 - pp - Nicholas Baptiste (3); 18:05 - Chad Thibodeau (1)		First period		No scoring
10:59 - pp - Mathew Campagna (2)		Second period		Blake Clarke (3) - pp - 8:23; Brandon Robinson (1) - 16:19
No scoring		Third period		Dylan Blujus (2) - pp - 15:42; Matt MacLeod (2) - 16:32
14:35 - Dominik Kubalík (3)		First overtime period		No scoring
Franky Palazzese (35 saves / 39 shots)		Goalie stats		Matěj Machovský (5 saves / 8 shots); Jacob Smith (25 saves / 27 shots)

March 29	Brampton Battalion	0 – 1	OT	Sudbury Wolves	Powerade Centre	Recap
No scoring		First period		No scoring
No scoring		Second period		No scoring
No scoring		Third period		No scoring
No scoring		First overtime period		Evan de Haan (1) - 6:23
Jacob Smith (21 saves / 22 shots)		Goalie stats		Franky Palazzese (35 saves / 35 shots)

Sudbury wins series 4 – 1

==== Western conference quarterfinals ====
===== (1) London Knights vs. (8) Saginaw Spirit =====
March 22	London Knights	5 – 2	Saginaw Spirit	Budweiser Gardens	Recap
5:02 - Dakota Mermis (1); 7:34 - Alex Broadhurst (1)		First period	No scoring
0:38 - pp - Max Domi (1); 8:07 - ps - Josh Anderson (1); 18:04 - Max Domi (2)		Second period	Andrey Alexeey (1) - 19:43
No scoring		Third period	Eric Locke (1) - 11:47
Anthony Stolarz (24 saves / 26 shots)		Goalie stats	Jake Paterson (24 saves / 29 shots); Nikita Serebryakov (9 saves / 9 shots)

March 24	London Knights	3 – 2	2OT	Saginaw Spirit	Budweiser Gardens	Recap
No scoring		First period		Justin Kea (1) - 12:21
No scoring		Second period		Jimmy Lodge (1) - pp - 19:46
6:57 - Bo Horvat (1); 19:59 - Bo Horvat (2)		Third period		No scoring
9:11 - Chris Tierney (1)		Second overtime period		No scoring
Anthony Stolarz (41 saves / 43 shots)		Goalie stats		Jake Paterson (67 saves / 70 shots)

March 26	Saginaw Spirit	1 – 7	London Knights	Dow Event Center	Recap
13:46 - pp - Dalton Young (1)		First period	Alex Broadhurst (2) - 2:12; Kyle Platzer (1) - 6:00
No scoring		Second period	Remi Elie (1) - 4:24; Alex Broadhurst (3) - pp - 6:12
No scoring		Third period	Paxton Leroux (1) - 2:45; Alex Broadhurst (4) - 12:19; Nikita Zadorov (1) - pp - 19:45
Jake Paterson (21 saves / 28 shots)		Goalie stats	Anthony Stolarz (32 saves / 33 shots)

March 28	Saginaw Spirit	2 – 6	London Knights	Dow Event Center	Recap
8:46 - pp - Eric Locke (2)		First period	Seth Griffith (1) - 1:20; Remi Elie (2) - 15:55; Max Domi (3) - 17:26
No scoring		Second period	Bo Horvat (3) - 19:44
No scoring		Third period	Olli Määttä (1) - 1:51; Remi Elie (3) - 5:43
Jake Paterson (17 saves / 23 shots); Nikita Serebryakov (7 saves / 7 shots)		Goalie stats	Anthony Stolarz (25 saves / 27 shots)

London wins series 4 – 0

===== (2) Plymouth Whalers vs. (7) Sarnia Sting =====
March 22	Plymouth Whalers	11 – 2	Sarnia Sting	Compuware Arena	Recap
1:12 - Vincent Trocheck (1); 6:38 - Tom Wilson (1); 14:12 - Garrett Meurs (1); 16:22 - Vincent Trocheck (2); 19:55 - Stefan Noesen (1)		First period	Charlie Sarault (1) - pp - 10:39
2:56 - pp - Garrett Meurs (2); 7:01 - Stefan Noesen (2); 14:53 - Gianluca Curcuruto (1)		Second period	Reid Boucher (1) - pp - 12:18
1:14 - Vincent Trocheck (3); 11:14 - pp - Matt Mistele (1); 18:38 - Cody Payne (1)		Third period	No scoring
Alex Nedeljkovic (31 saves / 33 shots)		Goalie stats	J.P. Anderson (39 saves / 50 shots)

March 23	Plymouth Whalers	3 – 2	Sarnia Sting	Compuware Arena	Recap
1:26 - Mitchell Heard (1)		First period	Nickolas Latta (1) - pp - 4:59
1:50 - Zach Lorentz (1); 6:36 - Tom Wilson (2)		Second period	No scoring
No scoring		Third period	Reid Boucher (2) - pp - 5:31
Alex Nedeljkovic (25 saves / 27 shots)		Goalie stats	J.P. Anderson (33 saves / 36 shots)

March 25	Sarnia Sting	2 – 5	Plymouth Whalers	RBC Centre	Recap
5:57 - Nickolas Latta (2)		First period	Rickard Rakell (1) - 1:03; Ryan Hartman (1) - 3:57; Stefan Noesen (3) - 10:49
No scoring		Second period	Ryan Hartman (2) - 6:55
15:01 - Tony DeAngelo (1)		Third period	Rickard Rakell (2) - 16:49
J.P. Anderson (39 saves / 44 shots)		Goalie stats	Alex Nedeljkovic (19 saves / 21 shots)

March 27	Sarnia Sting	2 – 5	Plymouth Whalers	RBC Centre	Recap
0:21 - Bryan Moore (1); 19:39 - pp - Nickolas Latta (3)		First period	Garrett Meurs (3) - 6:39; Vincent Trocheck (4) - sh - 7:31
No scoring		Second period	Mitchell Heard (2) - pp - 19:57
No scoring		Third period	Vincent Trocheck (5) - 2:04; Mitchell Heard (3) - pp - 12:59
J.P. Anderson (43 saves / 48 shots)		Goalie stats	Alex Nedeljkovic (22 saves / 24 shots)

Plymouth wins series 4 – 0

===== (3) Owen Sound Attack vs. (6) Sault Ste. Marie Greyhounds =====
March 21	Owen Sound Attack	2 – 1	OT	Sault Ste. Marie Greyhounds	Bayshore Community Centre	Recap
19:08 - Artur Gavrus (1)		First period		Michael Schumacher (1) - 7:37
No scoring		Second period		No scoring
No scoring		Third period		No scoring
4:58 - Daniel Milne (1)		First overtime period		No scoring
Jordan Binnington (37 saves / 38 shots)		Goalie stats		Matt Murray (36 saves / 38 shots)

March 23	Owen Sound Attack	4 – 2	Sault Ste. Marie Greyhounds	Bayshore Community Centre	Recap
No scoring		First period	Nick Cousins (1) - 4:54
5:40 - pp - Zach Nastasiuk (1); 14:24 - Keevin Cutting (1); 16:41 - pp - Gemel Smith (1)		Second period	Michael Schumacher (2) - 11:13
19:47 - en - Zach Nastasiuk (2)		Third period	No scoring
Jordan Binnington (41 saves / 43 shots)		Goalie stats	Matt Murray (20 saves / 23 shots)

March 25	Sault Ste. Marie Greyhounds	5 – 3	Owen Sound Attack	Essar Centre	Recap
No scoring		First period	Gemel Smith (2) - 19:41
1:12 - pp - Nick Cousins (2); 2:34 - pp - Michael Schumacher (3); 2:48 - pp - Nick Cousins (3)		Second period	Gemel Smith (3) - 8:19
2:49 - Darnell Nurse (1); 19:43 - sh - en - Brandon Alderson (1)		Third period	Kyle Hope (1) - 8:30
Matt Murray (22 saves / 25 shots)		Goalie stats	Jordan Binnington (30 saves / 34 shots)

March 27	Sault Ste. Marie Greyhounds	1 – 0	OT	Owen Sound Attack	Essar Centre	Recap
No scoring		First period		No scoring
No scoring		Second period		No scoring
No scoring		Third period		No scoring
19:12 - pp - Ryan Sproul (1)		First overtime period		No scoring
Matt Murray (36 saves / 36 shots)		Goalie stats		Jordan Binnington (41 saves / 42 shots)

March 29	Owen Sound Attack	5 – 3	Sault Ste. Marie Greyhounds	Bayshore Community Centre	Recap
2:42 - Daniel Catenacci (1); 4:16 - Daniel Catenacci (2)		First period	Michael Schumacher (4) - 12:07
5:15 - Gemel Smith (4); 11:44 - Gilbert Gabor (1); 18:29 - Gemel Smith (5)		Second period	Ryan Sproul (2) - pp - 4:16; Sergey Tolchinsky (1) - pp - 7:42
No scoring		Third period	No scoring
Jordan Binnington (24 saves / 27 shots)		Goalie stats	Matt Murray (35 saves / 40 shots)

March 31	Sault Ste. Marie Greyhounds	3 – 4	Owen Sound Attack	Essar Centre	Recap
4:11 - Sergey Tolchinsky (2)		First period	Zach Nastasiuk (3) - sh - 15:31
14:52 - Tyler Gaudet (1)		Second period	Gemel Smith (6) - 8:09
19:11 - Colin Miller (1)		Third period	Holden Cook (1) - 4:31; Artur Gavrus - 16:37
Matt Murray (22 saves / 26 shots)		Goalie stats	Jordan Binnington (34 saves / 37 shots)

Owen Sound wins series 4 – 2

===== (4) Kitchener Rangers vs. (5) Guelph Storm =====
March 22	Kitchener Rangers	5 – 2	Guelph Storm	Kitchener Auditorium	Recap
10:51 - pp - Ryan Murphy (1)		First period	Andrey Pedan (1) - pp - 17:07
3:32 - pp - Ryan Murphy (2); 11:31 - pp - Evan McEneny (1); 15:52 - Curtis Meighan (1); 17:53 - pp - Matt Puempel (1)		Second period	Jason Dickinson (1) - 0:36
No scoring		Third period	No scoring
John Gibson (36 saves / 38 shots)		Goalie stats	Garret Sparks (24 saves / 29 shots); Michael Nishi (13 saves / 13 shots)

March 24	Kitchener Rangers	2 – 0	Guelph Storm	Kitchener Auditorium	Recap
No scoring		First period	No scoring
10:18 - Matt Puempel (2)		Second period	No scoring
1:59 - Eric Ming (1)		Third period	No scoring
John Gibson (49 saves / 49 shots)		Goalie stats	Garret Sparks (36 saves / 38 shots)

March 26	Guelph Storm	3 – 2	Kitchener Rangers	Sleeman Centre	Recap
No scoring		First period	Ben Thomson (1) - 12:31
No scoring		Second period	No scoring
14:30 - Andrey Pedan (2); 17:50 - Andrey Pedan (3); 18:11 - Scott Kosmachuk (1)		Third period	Radek Faksa (1) - 8:56
Garret Sparks (33 saves / 35 shots)		Goalie stats	John Gibson (40 saves / 43 shots)

March 28	Guelph Storm	1 – 2	Kitchener Rangers	Sleeman Centre	Recap
No scoring		First period	Radek Faksa (2) - 10:59
No scoring		Second period	No scoring
11:35 - pp - Zack Mitchell (1)		Third period	Josh Leivo (1) - pp - 9:50
Garret Sparks (30 saves / 32 shots)		Goalie stats	John Gibson (40 saves / 41 shots)

March 29	Kitchener Rangers	4 – 2	Guelph Storm	Kitchener Auditorium	Recap
No scoring		First period	No scoring
1:38 - Max Iafrate (1); 6:32 - sh - Tobias Rieder (1); 13:59 - pp - Radek Faksa (3)		Second period	No scoring
18:27 - pp - en - Josh Leivo (2)		Third period	Brock McGinn (1) - 7:42; Brock McGinn (2) - ps - 10:40
John Gibson (35 saves / 37 shots)		Goalie stats	Garret Sparks (38 saves / 41 shots)

Kitchener wins series 4 – 1

=== Conference semifinals ===
==== Eastern conference semifinals ====
===== (1) Belleville Bulls vs. (5) Sudbury Wolves =====
April 5	Belleville Bulls	6 – 3	Sudbury Wolves	Yardmen Arena	Recap
3:09 - Niki Petti (1); 12:30 - pp - Tyler Graovac (3)		First period	Michael Kantor (2) - 15:53; Dominik Kahun (1) - pp - 19:41
1:27 - Carter Sandlak (4); 10:31 - Daniil Zharkov (2); 13:10 - pp - Scott Simmonds (3)		Second period	No scoring
17:58 - Stephen Silas (2)		Third period	Nathan Pancel (2) - 4:32
Malcolm Subban (29 saves / 32 shots)		Goalie stats	Franky Palazzese (40 saves / 46 shots)

April 7	Belleville Bulls	4 – 1	Sudbury Wolves	Yardmen Arena	Recap
7:02 - Jordan Subban (2); 11:26 - pp - Stephen Silas (3); 18:42 - Austen Brassard (2)		First period	No scoring
No scoring		Second period	No scoring
19:15 - en - Joseph Cramarossa (3)		Third period	Nathan Pancel (3) - 4:58
Malcolm Subban (17 saves / 18 shots)		Goalie stats	Franky Palazzese (24 saves / 27 shots)

April 9	Sudbury Wolves	0 – 4	Belleville Bulls	Sudbury Community Arena	Recap
No scoring		First period	Tyler Graovac (4) - 15:02; Joseph Cramarossa (4) - 15:31
No scoring		Second period	No scoring
No scoring		Third period	Brendan Gaunce (4) - 10:15; Brendan Gaunce (5) - 12:37
Franky Palazzese (28 saves / 32 shots)		Goalie stats	Malcolm Subban (28 saves / 28 shots)

April 11	Sudbury Wolves	0 – 5	Belleville Bulls	Sudbury Community Arena	Recap
No scoring		First period	Daniil Zharkov (3) - 11:45; Austen Brassard (3) - 15:21
No scoring		Second period	Daniil Zharkov (4) - 16:36
No scoring		Third period	Tyler Graovac (5) - pp - 3:15; Aaron Berisha (1) - pp - 3:34
Franky Palazzese (25 saves / 30 shots)		Goalie stats	Malcolm Subban (27 saves / 27 shots)

Belleville wins series 4 – 0

===== (2) Barrie Colts vs. (3) Oshawa Generals =====
April 3	Barrie Colts	4 – 3	OT	Oshawa Generals	Barrie Molson Centre	Recap
11:05 - Mark Scheifele (5)		First period		Michael Dal Colle (2) - 8:04
No scoring		Second period		Bradley Latour (4) - sh - 1:59; Scott Sabourin (3) - 5:18
15:08 - Steven Beyers (3); 16:41 - pp - Zach Hall (1)		Third period		No scoring
1:18 - Zach Hall (2)		First overtime period		No scoring
Mathias Niederberger (40 saves / 43 shots)		Goalie stats		Daniel Altshuller (32 saves / 36 shots)

April 5	Barrie Colts	4 – 1	Oshawa Generals	Barrie Molson Centre	Recap
No scoring		First period	No scoring
13:16 - sh - Mitchell Theoret (6); 16:01 - Mitchell Theoret (7); 17:03 - Andreas Athanasiou (5)		Second period	Scott Laughton (7) - 12:32
19:15 - pp - en - Mitchell Theoret (8)		Third period	No scoring
Mathias Niederberger (29 saves / 30 shots)		Goalie stats	Daniel Altshuller (40 saves / 43 shots)

April 7	Oshawa Generals	0 – 4	Barrie Colts	General Motors Centre	Recap
No scoring		First period	Steven Beyers (4) - pp - 3:09; Aaron Ekblad (2) - pp - 19:42
No scoring		Second period	No scoring
No scoring		Third period	Anthony Camara (4) - pp - 5:41; Andreas Athanasiou (6) - 14:53
Daniel Altshuller (21 saves / 25 shots)		Goalie stats	Mathias Niederberger (35 saves / 35 shots)

April 9	Oshawa Generals	2 – 4	Barrie Colts	General Motors Centre	Recap
No scoring		First period	Steven Beyers (5) - 10:29
17:46 - Colin Suellentrop (1)		Second period	Aaron Ekblad (3) - 6:01; Alex Yuill (1) - 9:55
19:00 - Scott Sabourin (4)		Third period	Alex Lepkowski (1) - 1:55
Daniel Altshuller (24 saves / 28 shots)		Goalie stats	Mathias Niederberger (36 saves / 38 shots)

Barrie wins series 4 – 0

==== Western conference semifinals ====
===== (1) London Knights vs. (4) Kitchener Rangers =====
April 5	London Knights	4 – 1	Kitchener Rangers	Budweiser Gardens	Recap
7:55 - Kyle Platzer (2); 17:43 - pp - Tyler Ferry (1)		First period	Matt Puempel (3) - 4:09
No scoring		Second period	No scoring
8:44 - Chris Tierney (2); 19:27 - en - Ryan Rupert (1)		Third period	No scoring
Anthony Stolarz (29 saves / 30 shots)		Goalie stats	John Gibson (33 saves / 36 shots)

April 7	London Knights	2 – 0	Kitchener Rangers	Budweiser Gardens	Recap
No scoring		First period	No scoring
No scoring		Second period	No scoring
15:24 - Max Domi (4); 18:27 - Bo Horvat (4)		Third period	No scoring
Anthony Stolarz (34 saves / 34 shots)		Goalie stats	John Gibson (28 saves / 30 shots)

April 8	Kitchener Rangers	6 – 2	London Knights	Kitchener Auditorium	Recap
4:53 - pp - Josh Leivo (3); 6:05 - Josh Sterk (1); 19:42 - Matia Marcantuoni (1)		First period	No scoring
4:14 - pp - Frank Corrado (1); 6:52 - pp - Ryan Murphy (3)		Second period	Ryan Rupert (2) - 13:34; Alex Broadhurst (5) - pp - 19:45
1:29 - pp - Radek Faksa (4)		Third period	No scoring
John Gibson (37 saves / 39 shots)		Goalie stats	Anthony Stolarz (16 saves / 20 shots); Jake Patterson (16 saves / 18 shots)

April 10	Kitchener Rangers	3 – 4	OT	London Knights	Kitchener Auditorium	Recap
8:24 - Justin Bailey (1); 13:06 - pp - Tobias Rieder (2); 18:34 - Ben Fanelli (1)		First period		Seth Griffith (2) - 9:08
No scoring		Second period		Matt Rupert (1) - pp - 13:22
No scoring		Third period		Nikita Zadorov (2) - 3:50
No scoring		First overtime period		Chris Tierney (3) - 13:24
John Gibson (57 saves / 61 shots)		Goalie stats		Anthony Stolarz (47 saves / 50 shots)

April 12	London Knights	4 – 1	Kitchener Rangers	Budweiser Gardens	Recap
7:15 - pp - Olli Määttä (2)		First period	No scoring
2:19 - Chris Tierney (4); 15:42 - pp - Ryan Rupert (3)		Second period	Eric Ming (2) - 17:06
19:02 - en - Max Domi (5)		Third period	No scoring
Anthony Stolarz (35 saves / 36 shots)		Goalie stats	John Gibson (29 saves / 32 shots)

London wins series 4 – 1

===== (2) Plymouth Whalers vs. (3) Owen Sound Attack =====
April 5	Plymouth Whalers	4 – 1	Owen Sound Attack	Compuware Arena	Recap
No scoring		First period	Gemel Smith (7) - 10:54
No scoring		Second period	No scoring
2:30 - pp - Garrett Meurs (4); 4:45 - Sebastian Uvira (1); 16:48 - Sebastian Uvira (2); 18:58 - sh - en - Rickard Rakell (3)		Third period	No scoring
Alex Nedeljkovic (22 saves / 23 shots)		Goalie stats	Jordan Binnington (30 saves / 33 shots)

April 7	Plymouth Whalers	1 – 3	Owen Sound Attack	Compuware Arena	Recap
3:56 - Ryan Hartman (3)		First period	No scoring
No scoring		Second period	Zach Nastasiuk (4) - 10:49
No scoring		Third period	Holden Cook (2) - 11:41; Kurtis Gabriel (1) - sh - 15:28
Alex Nedeljkovic (24 saves / 27 shots)		Goalie stats	Jordan Binnington (36 saves / 37 shots)

April 9	Owen Sound Attack	3 – 6	Plymouth Whalers	Bayshore Community Centre	Recap
15:20 - pp - Kurtis Gabriel (2); 15:33 - Holden Cook (3)		First period	Stefan Noesen (4) - 18:49
12:04 - pp - Cody Ceci (1)		Second period	Garrett Meurs (5) - pp - 14:15; Vincent Trocheck (6) - pp - 15:03; Mitchell Heard (4) - pp - 17:58
No scoring		Third period	Vincent Trocheck (7) - pp - 3:10; Vincent Trocheck (8) - en - 18:13
Jordan Binnington (25 saves / 30 shots)		Goalie stats	Alex Nedeljkovic (29 saves / 32 shots)

April 10	Owen Sound Attack	4 – 3	Plymouth Whalers	Bayshore Community Centre	Recap
8:02 - pp - Kurtis Gabriel (3); 17:43 - pp - Daniel Catenacci (3)		First period	No scoring
2:30 - Holden Cook (4); 5:14 - Artur Gavrus (3)		Second period	Connor Carrick (1) - pp - 7:48; Stefan Noesen (5) - 18:14
No scoring		Third period	Vincent Trocheck (9) - 17:47
Jordan Binnington (21 saves / 24 shots)		Goalie stats	Alex Nedeljkovic (15 saves / 19 shots); Matt Mahalak (15 saves / 15 shots)

April 12	Plymouth Whalers	5 – 0	Owen Sound Attack	Compuware Arena	Recap
6:41 - Stefan Noesen (6); 17:19 - pp - Tom Wilson (3); 17:35 - Mitchell Heard (5)		First period	No scoring
1:33 - Stefan Noesen (7); 3:44 - Mitchell Heard (6)		Second period	No scoring
No scoring		Third period	No scoring
Alex Nedeljkovic (19 saves / 19 shots)		Goalie stats	Jordan Binnington (15 saves / 20 shots); Brandon Hope (23 saves / 23 shots)

April 14	Owen Sound Attack	1 – 3	Plymouth Whalers	Bayshore Community Centre	Recap
No scoring		First period	Matt Mistele (2) - 2:33; Matt Mistele (3) - 18:49
2:13 - pp - Cameron Brace (1)		Second period	No scoring
No scoring		Third period	Mitchell Heard (7) - en - 19:48
Jordan Binnington (28 saves / 30 shots)		Goalie stats	Alex Nedeljkovic (32 saves / 33 shots)

Plymouth wins series 4 – 2

=== Conference finals ===
==== Eastern conference finals ====
===== (1) Belleville Bulls vs. (2) Barrie Colts =====
April 19	Belleville Bulls	3 – 2	Barrie Colts	Yardmen Arena	Recap
No scoring		First period	Zach Hall (3) - 2:54
14:10 - Stephen Silas (4); 14:10 - Austen Brassard (4)		Second period	Aaron Ekblad (4) - pp - 9:28
18:05 - pp - Austen Brassard (5)		Third period	No scoring
Malcolm Subban (26 saves / 28 shots)		Goalie stats	Mathias Niederberger (38 saves / 41 shots)

April 20	Belleville Bulls	0 – 5	Barrie Colts	Yardmen Arena	Recap
No scoring		First period	Mark Scheifele (6) - pp - 6:01; Mark Scheifele (7) - 9:07
No scoring		Second period	6:29 - pp - Mitchell Theoret (9); Josh MacDonald (1) - sh - 15:35; Steven Beyers (6) - 19:45
No scoring		Third period	No scoring
Malcolm Subban (18 saves / 23 shots); Charlie Graham (8 saves / 8 shots)		Goalie stats	Mathias Niederberger (32 saves / 32 shots)

April 22	Barrie Colts	5 – 4	OT	Belleville Bulls	Barrie Molson Centre	Recap
10:41 - pp - Zach Hall (4); 18:31 - Mitchell Theoret (10)		First period		Joseph Cramarossa (5) - 8:21
10:59 - Jake Dotchin (1); 12:36 - Jonathan Laser (1)		Second period		Tyler Graovac (6) - 5:46; Garrett Hooey (2) - pp - 16:52; Jake Cardwell (4) - 17:27
No scoring		Third period		No scoring
19:55 - Anthony Camara (5)		First overtime period		No scoring
Mathias Niederberger (35 saves / 39 shots)		Goalie stats		Malcolm Subban (43 saves / 48 shots)

April 24	Barrie Colts	4 – 3	OT	Belleville Bulls	Barrie Molson Centre	Recap
10:21 - Mark Scheifele (8); 18:20 - pp - Aaron Ekblad (5)		First period		Garrett Hooey (3) - 5:02
No scoring		Second period		Brendan Gaunce (6) - 8:18
0:52 - Zach Hall (5)		Third period		Alan Quine (4) - 5:35
5:26 - Brendan Lemieux (1)		First overtime period		No scoring
Mathias Niederberger (25 saves / 28 shots)		Goalie stats		Malcolm Subban (38 saves / 42 shots)

April 26	Belleville Bulls	3 – 1	Barrie Colts	Yardmen Arena	Recap
No scoring		First period	No scoring
16:09 - Austen Brassard (6); 18:42 - Alan Quine (5)		Second period	Anthony Camara (6) - 3:33
13:27 - pp - Alan Quine (6)		Third period	No scoring
Malcolm Subban (41 saves / 42 shots)		Goalie stats	Mathias Niederberger (37 saves / 40 shots)

April 27	Barrie Colts	1 – 3	Belleville Bulls	Barrie Molson Centre	Recap
No scoring		First period	No scoring
18:51 - Aaron Ekblad (6)		Second period	Brendan Gaunce (7) - 0:19
No scoring		Third period	Brendan Gaunce (8) - 15:27; Alan Quine (7) - 17:44
Mathias Niederberger (27 saves / 30 shots)		Goalie stats	Malcolm Subban (32 saves / 33 shots)

April 29	Belleville Bulls	1 – 3	Barrie Colts	Yardmen Arena	Recap
8:12 - pp - Alan Quine (8)		First period	Aaron Ekblad (7) - 17:29
No scoring		Second period	Tyson Fawcett (1) - pp - 11:49
No scoring		Third period	Ryan O'Connor (1) - 14:10
Malcolm Subban (25 saves / 28 shots)		Goalie stats	Mathias Niederberger (36 saves / 37 shots)

Barrie wins series 4 – 3

==== Western conference finals ====
===== (1) London Knights vs. (2) Plymouth Whalers =====
April 19	London Knights	2 – 1	Plymouth Whalers	Budweiser Gardens	Recap
19:54 - Ryan Rupert (4)		First period	No scoring
15:06 - Remi Elie (4)		Second period	Connor Carrick (2) - 13:57
No scoring		Third period	No scoring
Anthony Stolarz (32 saves / 33 shots)		Goalie stats	Alex Nedeljkovic (29 saves / 31 shots)

April 21	London Knights	3 – 4	2OT	Plymouth Whalers	Budweiser Gardens	Recap
11:35 - Bo Horvat (5)		First period		No scoring
12:21 - pp - Chris Tierney (5)		Second period		Tom Wilson (4) - 7:38
10:06 - pp - Max Domi (6)		Third period		Tom Wilson (5) - pp - 6:53; Tom Wilson (6) - 19:12
No scoring		Second overtime period		Rickard Rakell (4) - pp - 10:16
Anthony Stolarz (41 saves / 45 shots)		Goalie stats		Alex Nedeljkovic (61 saves / 64 shots)

April 23	Plymouth Whalers	4 – 6	London Knights	Compuware Arena	Recap
No scoring		First period	Ryan Rupert (5) - pp - 2:11; Bo Horvat (6) - sh - 8:42; Bo Horvat (7) - sh - 9:51
No scoring		Second period	No scoring
1:35 - pp - Tom Wilson (7); 5:44 - Tom Wilson (8); 10:59 - Rickard Rakell (5); 12:01 - Mitchell Heard (8)		Third period	Max Domi (7) - pp - 15:17; Seth Griffith (3) - 16:06; Max Domi (8) - en - 19:03
Alex Nedeljkovic (22 saves / 27 shots)		Goalie stats	Anthony Stolarz (38 saves / 42 shots)

April 24	Plymouth Whalers	4 – 6	London Knights	Compuware Arena	Recap
6:34 - Sebastian Uvira (3); 12:52 - pp - Vincent Trocheck (10)		First period	Alex Broadhurst (6) - 9:10; Seth Griffith (4) - pp - 18:58
11:39 - pp - Garrett Meurs (6); 17:16 - Tom Wilson (9)		Second period	Bo Horvat (8) - pp - 5:41; Ryan Rupert (6) - 9:38
No scoring		Third period	Alex Broadhurst (7) - pp - 5:29; Seth Griffith (5) - en - 18:40
Alex Nedeljkovic (7 saves / 11 shots); Matt Mahalak (15 saves / 16 shots)		Goalie stats	Anthony Stolarz (42 saves / 46 shots)

April 26	London Knights	5 – 4	OT	Plymouth Whalers	Budweiser Gardens	Recap
9:24 - Max Domi (9); 15:56 - Alex Broadhurst (8)		First period		No scoring
2:30 - pp - Bo Horvat (9); 6:49 - pp - Alex Broadhurst (9)		Second period		Ryan Hartman (4) - 17:26
No scoring		Third period		Garrett Meurs (7) - 9:09; Rickard Rakell (6) - 11:42; Gianluca Curcuruto (2) - 15:27
0:20 - Max Domi (10)		First overtime period		No scoring
Anthony Stolarz (37 saves / 41 shots)		Goalie stats		Alex Nedeljkovic (29 saves / 34 shots)

London wins series 4 – 1

=== J. Ross Robertson Cup ===
==== (W1) London Knights vs. (E2) Barrie Colts ====
May 3	London Knights	2 – 4	Barrie Colts	Budweiser Gardens	Recap
No scoring		First period	No scoring
5:24 - Ryan Rupert (7)		Second period	Andreas Athanasiou (7) - 7:37; Anthony Camara (7) - 15:21
8:56 - pp - Alex Broadhurst (10)		Third period	Brendan Lemieux (2) - pp - 1:24; Mark Scheifele (9) - en - 19:17
Anthony Stolarz (24 saves / 27 shots)		Goalie stats	Mathias Niederberger (42 saves / 44 shots)

May 5	London Knights	4 – 1	Barrie Colts	Budweiser Gardens	Recap
No scoring		First period	No scoring
0:18 - Seth Griffith (6); 1:15 - Bo Horvat (10); 14:31 - pp - Brett Welychka (1)		Second period	No scoring
18:36 - en - Seth Griffith (7)		Third period	Andreas Athanasiou (8) - sh - 9:11
Anthony Stolarz (22 saves / 23 shots)		Goalie stats	Mathias Niederberger (41 saves / 44 shots)

May 6	Barrie Colts	6 – 3	London Knights	Barrie Molson Centre	Recap
0:35 - Zach Hall (6); 8:49 - Mark Scheifele (10)		First period	Ryan Rupert (8) - 7:16; Olli Määttä (3) - pp - 10:57
4:12 - pp - Zach Hall (7)		Second period	No scoring
1:40 - Alex Lepkowski (2); 16:48 - Andreas Athanasiou (9); 19:22 - sh - en - Mark Scheifele (11)		Third period	Seth Griffith (8) - pp - 15:38
Mathias Niederberger (29 saves / 32 shots)		Goalie stats	Anthony Stolarz (23 saves / 28 shots)

May 8	Barrie Colts	6 – 4	London Knights	Barrie Molson Centre	Recap
0:37 - Anthony Camara (8)		First period	Tyler Ferry (2) - 3:23; Bo Horvat (11) - 7:05
No scoring		Second period	Brett Welychka (2) - 2:46
0:44 - Mark Scheifele (12); 1:17 - Josh MacDonald (2); 4:23 - Mark Scheifele (13); 8:05 - pp - Mark Scheifele (14); 19:53 - en - Mark Scheifele (15)		Third period	Ryan Rupert (9) - 3:09
Mathias Niederberger (29 saves / 33 shots)		Goalie stats	Anthony Stolarz (20 saves / 25 shots)

May 10	London Knights	6 – 4	Barrie Colts	Budweiser Gardens	Recap
9:14 - Seth Griffith (9)		First period	No scoring
2:30 - Chris Tierney (6); 12:32 - Max Domi (11); 16:59 - pp - Bo Horvat (12)		Second period	Mitchell Theoret (11) - 6:22
6:21 - sh - Bo Horvat (13); 10:48 - Brett Welychka (3)		Third period	Ryan O'Connor (2) - 1:44; Anthony Camara (9) - 9:19; Andreas Athanasiou (10) - sh - 18:14
Jake Patterson (25 saves / 29 shots)		Goalie stats	Mathias Niederberger (28 saves / 34 shots); Alex Fotinos (3 saves / 3 shots)

May 11	Barrie Colts	4 – 5	OT	London Knights	Barrie Molson Centre	Recap
No scoring		First period		Brett Welychka (4) - 2:25; Tommy Hughes (1) - 7:54
No scoring		Second period		Bo Horvat (14) - 7:15; Ryan Rupert (10) - 16:50
4:55 - pp - Andreas Athanasiou (11); 15:07 - Erik Bradford (2); 15:32 - Mitchell Theoret (12); 19:18 - Mitchell Theoret (13)		Third period		No scoring
No scoring		First overtime period		Ryan Rupert (11) - 1:30
Mathias Niederberger (18 saves / 22 shots); Alex Fotinos (7 saves / 8 shots)		Goalie stats		Jake Patterson (23 saves / 27 shots)

May 13	London Knights	3 – 2	Barrie Colts	Budweiser Gardens	Recap
7:13 - Bo Horvat (15)		First period	Andreas Athanasiou (12) - pp - 8:59
16:58 - pp - Olli Määttä (4)		Second period	No scoring
19:59 - Bo Horvat (16)		Third period	Mitchell Theoret (14) - 17:07
Jake Patterson (30 saves / 32 shots)		Goalie stats	Mathias Niederberger (45 saves / 48 shots)

London wins series 4 – 3

=== J. Ross Robertson Cup Champions Roster ===
2012–13 London Knights
Goaltenders: (Canada) 35 – Jake Patterson; (United States) 43 – Anthony Stolarz	Defencemen: (Finland) 2 – Olli Määttä; (Canada) 3 – Justin Sefton; (Canada) 4 – Miles Liberati; (Canada) 6 – Scott Harrington – C; (Canada) 14 – Tommy Hughes – A; (Canada) 21 – Tyler Ferry; (United States) 44 – Dakota Mermis; (Canada) 51 – Paxton Leroux; (Russia) 65 – Nikita Zadorov	Wingers: (Canada) 7 – Corey Pawley; (Canada) 11 – Owen MacDonald; (Canada) 17 – Seth Griffith – A; (Canada) 46 – Matt Rupert; (Canada) 53 – Bo Horvat; (Canada) 77 – Josh Anderson; (Canada) 81 – Remi Elie; (Canada) 91 – Kyle Platzer; (Canada) 95 – Jacob Jammes	Centres: (Canada) 16 – Max Domi; (United States) 18 – Alex Broadhurst; (Canada) 27 – Brett Welychka; (Canada) 64 – Ryan Rupert; (Canada) 71 – Chris Tierney; Coach: (Canada) Dale Hunter; General Manager: (Canada) Mark Hunter

=== Playoff scoring leaders ===
Note: GP = Games played; G = Goals; A = Assists; Pts = Points; PIM = Penalty minutes

Player	Team	GP	G	A	Pts	PIM
Mark Scheifele	Barrie Colts	21	15	26	41	14
Max Domi	London Knights	21	11	21	32	26
Alex Broadhurst	London Knights	21	10	18	28	22
Zach Hall	Barrie Colts	19	7	21	28	20
Andreas Athanasiou	Barrie Colts	22	12	13	25	11
Seth Griffith	London Knights	21	9	16	25	14
Vincent Trocheck	Plymouth Whalers	15	10	14	24	8
Bo Horvat	London Knights	21	16	7	23	10
Brendan Gaunce	Belleville Bulls	17	8	14	22	10
Tyler Graovac	Belleville Bulls	15	6	16	22	17

=== Playoff leading goaltenders ===
Note: GP = Games played; Mins = Minutes played; W = Wins; L = Losses: OTL = Overtime losses; SL = Shootout losses; GA = Goals Allowed; SO = Shutouts; GAA = Goals against average

Player	Team	GP	Mins	W	L	GA	SO	Sv%	GAA
Malcolm Subban	Belleville Bulls	17	1021	11	6	34	3	0.933	2.00
John Gibson	Kitchener Rangers	10	609	5	5	22	1	0.946	2.17
Anthony Stolarz	London Knights	18	1115	13	5	47	1	0.923	2.53
Mathias Niederberger	Barrie Colts	22	1313	15	6	57	2	0.928	2.60
Matt Murray	Sault Ste. Marie Greyhounds	6	381	2	4	17	1	0.910	2.67

== Awards ==
J. Ross Robertson Cup:	London Knights
Hamilton Spectator Trophy:	London Knights
Bobby Orr Trophy:	Barrie Colts
Wayne Gretzky Trophy:	London Knights
Emms Trophy:	Barrie Colts
Leyden Trophy:	Belleville Bulls
Holody Trophy:	London Knights
Bumbacco Trophy:	Plymouth Whalers
Red Tilson Trophy:	Vincent Trocheck, Plymouth Whalers
Eddie Powers Memorial Trophy:	Vincent Trocheck, Plymouth Whalers
Matt Leyden Trophy:	Mike Vellucci, Plymouth Whalers
Jim Mahon Memorial Trophy:	Seth Griffith, London Knights
Max Kaminsky Trophy:	Ryan Sproul, Sault Ste. Marie Greyhounds
OHL Goaltender of the Year:	Jordan Binnington, Owen Sound Attack
Jack Ferguson Award:	Travis Konecny, Ottawa 67's
Dave Pinkney Trophy:	Jordan Binnington & Brandon Hope, Owen Sound Attack
OHL Executive of the Year:	Mike Vellucci, Plymouth Whalers
Bill Long Award:	Ray McKelvie, Owen Sound Attack
Emms Family Award:	Connor McDavid, Erie Otters
F. W. "Dinty" Moore Trophy:	Alex Nedeljkovic, Plymouth Whalers
Dan Snyder Memorial Trophy:	Ben Fanelli, Kitchener Rangers
William Hanley Trophy:	Tyler Graovac, Belleville Bulls
Leo Lalonde Memorial Trophy:	Charles Sarault, Sarnia Sting
Bobby Smith Trophy:	Darnell Nurse, Sault Ste. Marie Greyhounds
Roger Neilson Memorial Award:	Daniel Altshuller, Oshawa Generals
Ivan Tennant Memorial Award:	Connor Burgess, Sudbury Wolves
Mickey Renaud Captain's Trophy:	Colin Miller, Sault Ste. Marie Greyhounds
Tim Adams Memorial Trophy:	Adam Craievich, Oakville Rangers
Wayne Gretzky 99 Award:	Bo Horvat, London Knights

== All-Star teams ==
The OHL All-Star Teams were selected by the OHL's General Managers.

=== First team ===
- Vincent Trocheck, Centre, Plymouth Whalers
- Reid Boucher, Left Wing, Sarnia Sting
- Seth Griffith, Right Wing, London Knights
- Ryan Sproul, Defence, Sault Ste. Marie Greyhounds
- Scott Harrington, Defence, London Knights
- Jordan Binnington, Goaltender, Owen Sound Attack
- Mike Vellucci, Coach, Plymouth Whalers

=== Second team ===
- Charles Sarault, Centre, Sarnia Sting
- Garret Ross, Left Wing, Saginaw Spirit
- Brett Ritchie, Right Wing, Niagara IceDogs
- Cody Ceci, Defence, Owen Sound Attack
- Ryan Murphy, Defence, Kitchener Rangers
- John Gibson, Goaltender, Kitchener Rangers
- George Burnett, Coach, Belleville Bulls

=== Third team ===
- Boone Jenner, Centre, Oshawa Generals
- Anthony Camara, Left Wing, Barrie Colts
- Cameron Brace, Right Wing, Owen Sound Attack
- Dylan DeMelo, Defence, Mississauga Steelheads
- Colin Miller, Defence, Sault Ste. Marie Greyhounds
- Malcolm Subban, Goaltender, Belleville Bulls
- D. J. Smith, Coach, Oshawa Generals

== 2013 OHL Priority Selection ==
On April 6, 2013, the OHL conducted the 2013 Ontario Hockey League Priority Selection. The Ottawa 67's held the first overall pick in the draft, and selected Travis Konecny from the Elgin-Middlesex Chiefs. Konecny was awarded the Jack Ferguson Award, awarded to the top pick in the draft.

Below are the players who were selected in the first round of the 2013 Ontario Hockey League Priority Selection.

#	Player	Nationality	OHL team	Hometown	Minor team
1	Travis Konecny (RW)	Canada	Ottawa 67's	Clachan, Ontario	Elgin-Middlesex Chiefs
2	Dylan Strome (C)	Canada	Erie Otters	Mississauga, Ontario	Toronto Marlboros
3	Matthew Spencer (D)	Canada	Peterborough Petes	Oakville, Ontario	Oakville Rangers
4	Sean Day (D)	/ (United States) Canada/USA	Mississauga Steelheads	Toronto, Ontario	Detroit Compuware 16U
5	Lawson Crouse (LW)	Canada	Kingston Frontenacs	Mount Brydges, Ontario	Elgin-Middlesex Chiefs
6	Hayden McCool (LW)	Canada	Niagara IceDogs	Whitby, Ontario	Whitby Wildcats
7	Kyle Capobianco (D)	Canada	Sudbury Wolves	Mississauga, Ontario	Oakville Rangers
8	Mitchell Stephens (RW)	Canada	Saginaw Spirit	Peterborough, Ontario	Toronto Marlboros
9	Nikita Korostelev (RW)	Russia	Sarnia Sting	Moscow, Russia	Toronto Jr. Canadiens
10	Brett McKenzie (C)	Canada	North Bay Battalion	Vars, Ontario	Oakville Rangers
11	Blake Speers (RW)	Canada	Sault Ste. Marie Greyhounds	Sault Ste. Marie, Ontario	Soo Thunder
12	Garrett McFadden (D)	Canada	Guelph Storm	Kincardine, Ontario	Grey-Bruce Highlanders
13	Mike Davies (LW)	Canada	Kitchener Rangers	Thorold, Ontario	Southern Tier Admirals
14	Mitchell Vande Sompel (D)	Canada	Oshawa Generals	London, Ontario	London Jr. Knights
15	Matthew Kreis (LW)	Canada	Barrie Colts	Georgetown, Ontario	Halton Hills Hurricanes
16	Jordan Greenway (LW)	United States	Plymouth Whalers	Potsdam, New York	Shattuck-St. Mary's 16U
17	Ethan Szypula (C)	Canada	Owen Sound Attack	London, Ontario	London Jr. Knights
18	Justin Lemcke (D)	Canada	Belleville Bulls	Whitby, Ontario	Whitby Wildcats
19	Mitch Marner (RW)	Canada	London Knights	Thornhill, Ontario	Don Mills Flyers

== 2013 NHL entry draft ==
On June 30, 2013, the National Hockey League conducted the 2013 NHL entry draft held at the Prudential Center in Newark, New Jersey. In total, 37 players from the Ontario Hockey League were selected in the draft. Sean Monahan of the Ottawa 67's was the first player from the OHL to be selected, as he was taken with the sixth overall pick by the Calgary Flames.

Below are the players selected from OHL teams at the NHL Entry Draft.

Round	#	Player	Nationality	NHL team	Hometown	OHL team
1	6	Sean Monahan (C)	Canada	Calgary Flames	Brampton, Ontario	Ottawa 67's
1	7	Darnell Nurse (D)	Canada	Edmonton Oilers	Hamilton, Ontario	Sault Ste. Marie Greyhounds
1	9	Bo Horvat (LW)	Canada	Vancouver Canucks	Rodney, Ontario	London Knights
1	12	Max Domi (C)	Canada	Phoenix Coyotes	Toronto, Ontario	London Knights
1	16	Nikita Zadorov (D)	Russia	Buffalo Sabres	Moscow, Russia	London Knights
1	19	Kerby Rychel (LW)	Canada	Columbus Blue Jackets	Tecumseh, Ontario	Windsor Spitfires
1	29	Jason Dickinson (LW)	Canada	Dallas Stars	Georgetown, Ontario	Guelph Storm
1	30	Ryan Hartman (LW)	United States	Chicago Blackhawks	West Dundee, Illinois	Plymouth Whalers
2	32	Chris Bigras (D)	Canada	Colorado Avalanche	Elmvale, Ontario	Owen Sound Attack
2	40	Remi Elie (LW)	Canada	Dallas Stars	Green Valley, Ontario	London Knights
2	48	Zach Nastasiuk (RW)	Canada	Detroit Red Wings	Barrie, Ontario	Owen Sound Attack
2	52	Justin Bailey (C)	United States	Buffalo Sabres	Williamsville, New York	Kitchener Rangers
2	58	Tyler Bertuzzi (LW)	Canada	Detroit Red Wings	Sudbury, Ontario	Guelph Storm
3	63	Spencer Martin (G)	Canada	Colorado Avalanche	Oakville, Ontario	Mississauga Steelheads
3	69	Nicholas Baptiste (RW)	Canada	Buffalo Sabres	Nepean, Ontario	Sudbury Wolves
3	71	Connor Crisp (C)	Canada	Montreal Canadiens	Alliston, Ontario	Erie Otters
3	73	Ryan Kujawinski (C)	Canada	San Jose Sharks	Iroquois Falls, Ontario	Kingston Frontenacs
3	81	Kurtis Gabriel (RW)	Canada	Minnesota Wild	Newmarket, Ontario	Owen Sound Attack
3	82	Carter Verhaeghe (C)	Canada	Toronto Maple Leafs	Waterdown, Ontario	Niagara IceDogs
3	84	Jimmy Lodge (C)	United States	Winnipeg Jets	Downingtown, Pennsylvania	Saginaw Spirit
3	85	Cole Cassels (C)	United States	Vancouver Canucks	Columbus, Ohio	Oshawa Generals
4	96	Kyle Platzer (RW)	Canada	Edmonton Oilers	Waterloo, Ontario	London Knights
4	101	Nick Paul (LW)	Canada	Dallas Stars	Mississauga, Ontario	Brampton Battalion
4	103	Justin Auger (RW)	Canada	Los Angeles Kings	Waterloo, Ontario	Guelph Storm
4	105	Nick Moutrey (RW)	Canada	Columbus Blue Jackets	Shelburne, Ontario	Saginaw Spirit
4	108	Ben Harpur (D)	Canada	Ottawa Senators	Niagara Falls, Ontario	Guelph Storm
4	115	Jordan Subban (D)	Canada	Vancouver Canucks	Rexdale, Ontario	Belleville Bulls
5	126	Brent Pedersen (LW)	Canada	Carolina Hurricanes	Arthur, Ontario	Kitchener Rangers
6	152	Josh Brown (D)	Canada	Florida Panthers	London, Ontario	Oshawa Generals
6	154	Henri Ikonen (LW)	Finland	Tampa Bay Lightning	Savonlinna, Finland	Kingston Frontenacs
6	156	Tyler Ganly (D)	Canada	Carolina Hurricanes	Milton, Ontario	Sault Ste. Marie Greyhounds
6	166	Alan Quine (C)	Canada	New York Islanders	Ottawa, Ontario	Belleville Bulls
6	178	Zac Leslie (D)	Canada	Los Angeles Kings	Ottawa, Ontario	Guelph Storm
7	189	Eric Locke (C)	Canada	Buffalo Sabres	Toronto, Ontario	Saginaw Spirit
7	191	Dominik Kubalík (LW)	Czech Republic	Los Angeles Kings	Plzeň, Czech Republic	Sudbury Wolves
7	205	Miles Liberati (D)	United States	Vancouver Canucks	Cheswick, Pennsylvania	London Knights
7	210	Mitchell Dempsey (LW)	Canada	Boston Bruins	Cambridge, Ontario	Sault Ste. Marie Greyhounds

== 2013 CHL Import Draft ==
On July 3, 2013, the Canadian Hockey League conducted the 2013 CHL Import Draft, in which teams in all three CHL leagues participate in. The Ottawa 67's held the first pick in the draft by a team in the OHL, and selected Alex Lintuniemi from Finland with their selection.

Below are the players who were selected in the first round by Ontario Hockey League teams in the 2013 CHL Import Draft.

#	Player	Nationality	OHL team	Hometown	Last team
2	Alex Lintuniemi (D)	Finland	Ottawa 67's	Helsinki, Finland	Jokerit Helsinki Jr.
5	Andre Burakovsky (LW)	Sweden	Erie Otters	Malmö, Sweden	Malmö IF Redhawks
8	Matej Paulovic (C)	Slovakia	Peterborough Petes	Topolcany, Slovakia	Farjestad BK Jr.
11	Jacob De La Rose (LW)	Sweden	Windsor Spitfires	Arvika, Sweden	Leksands IF
14	Artem Rasulov (LW)	Russia	Mississauga Steelheads	Kazan, Russia	Kazan Irbis
17	No selection made		Kingston Frontenacs		
20	Nikita Yazkov (LW)	Russia	Windsor Spitfires	Novokuznetsk, Russia	Novokuznetsk Kuznetskiye
23	Dmitrii Sergeev (D)	Russia	Kitchener Rangers	Chelyabinsk, Russia	Chelyabinsk Traktor U17
26	Phil Baltisberger (D)	Switzerland	Guelph Storm	Zurich, Switzerland	Zurich GCK Lions
29	Vladislav Kodola (C)	Belarus	Sarnia Sting	Gomel, Belarus	Cherepovets Severstal U17
32	Alexander Henriksson (RW)	Sweden	North Bay Battalion	Skövde, Sweden	Farjestad BK Jr.
35	Jorgen Karterud (RW)	Norway	Sault Ste. Marie Greyhounds	Oslo, Norway	Valerenga
38	Pius Suter (C/LW)	Switzerland	Guelph Storm	Wallisellen, Switzerland	Zurich GCK Lions
41	Victor Crus-Rydberg (C)	Sweden	Plymouth Whalers	Tingsryd, Sweden	Linköping HC Jr.
44	Jimi Kuronen (D)	Finland	Oshawa Generals	Forssa, Finland	Lukko Rauma Jr.
47	Daniel Gibl (G)	Slovakia	Barrie Colts	Ilava, Slovakia	Martin Jr.
50	Damir Sharipzyanov (D)	Russia	Owen Sound Attack	Nizhnekamsk, Russia	Nizhnekamsk Reaktor
53	No selection made		Sudbury Wolves		
56	David Tomášek (C)	Czech Republic	Belleville Bulls	Prague, Czech Republic	Oakland Jr. Grizzlies 16U
58	Alex Rašner (D)	Czech Republic	London Knights	Jeseník, Czech Republic	Olomouc Jr.

== See also ==
- 2013 Memorial Cup
- List of OHL seasons
- 2012–13 QMJHL season
- 2012–13 WHL season
- 2012 in ice hockey
- 2013 in ice hockey

Preceded by 2011–12 OHL season	OHL seasons	Succeeded by 2013–14 OHL season
