= Anthony Camara =

Canadian professional ice hockey player

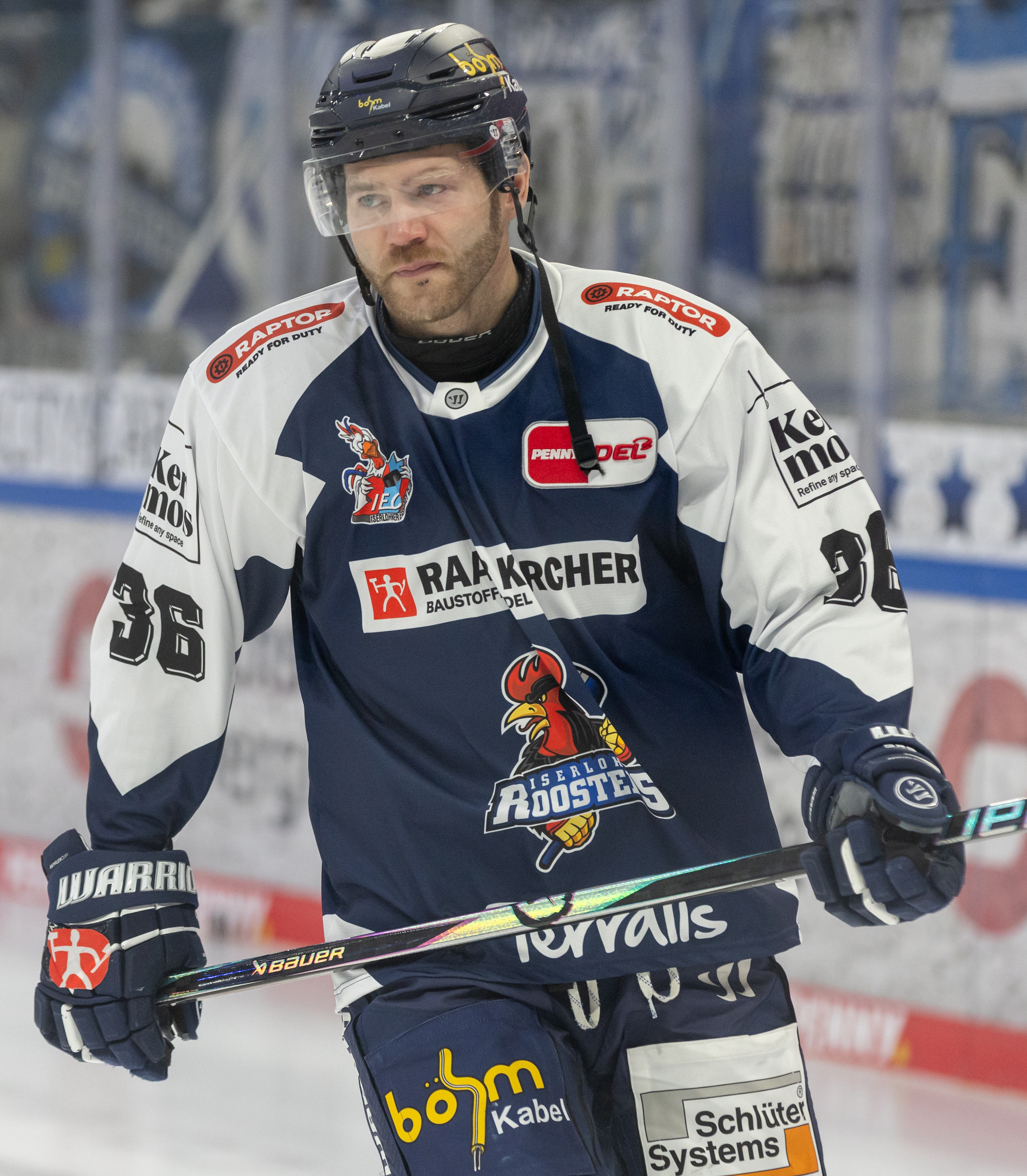
- Born: September 4, 1993 (age 33) Toronto, Ontario, Canada
- Height: 6 ft 0 in (183 cm)
- Weight: 192 lb (87 kg; 13 st 10 lb)
- Position: Left wing
- Shoots: Left
- KHL team Former teams: Admiral Vladivostok; Providence Bruins; Charlotte Checkers; St. John's IceCaps; Odense Bulldogs; Graz 99ers Iserlohn Roosters; HV71; HC Dynamo Pardubice; Neftekhimik Nizhnekamsk; Barys Astana; HK Nitra; Lada Togliatti
- NHL draft: 81st overall, 2011; Boston Bruins
- Playing career: 2013–present

Anthony Camara (born September 4, 1993) is a Canadian professional ice hockey player. He is currently playing with Admiral Vladivostok in the Kontinental Hockey League (KHL). Camara was selected by the Boston Bruins in the 3rd round (81st overall) of the 2011 NHL entry draft.

== Playing career ==
Camara played five seasons (2009–2013) of major junior hockey in the Ontario Hockey League (OHL) with the Saginaw Spirit and Barrie Colts, where he had a breakout year in 2012–13 scoring 36 goals and 24 assists in 50 games played.

Camara made his professional debut in the American Hockey League with the Providence Bruins during the 2013–14 season. In the second year of his contract with the Boston Bruins, Camara made the opening night roster, but was placed on injured reserve before opening night.

During the 2015–16 season, his third with the Providence Bruins, Camara was included in a trade at the NHL deadline by the Bruins, along with two draft picks to the Carolina Hurricanes in exchange for John-Michael Liles on February 29, 2016. He closed out the season with AHL affiliate, the Charlotte Checkers contributing with 8 points in 15 games.

Camara remained a free agent over the duration of the summer and into the 2016–17 season, before he belatedly signed an ECHL contract with the Kalamazoo Wings on November 4, 2016. In a leading offensive role for the K-Wings, Camara responded with 17 points in 25 games before returning to the AHL in agreeing to a professional try-out deal with the St. John's IceCaps on January 5, 2017.

As an un-signed free agent approaching the 2017–18 season, Camara signed his first contract abroad in agreeing to a one-year deal with Danish club, Odense Bulldogs of the Metal Ligaen on August 1, 2017. Camara scored 37 points in 27 games before moving to the EBEL with Graz 99ers before completing the season with German outfit, Iserlohn Roosters of the Deutsche Eishockey Liga (DEL).

Following a successful 2018–19 season with the Roosters, compiling a professional personal high with 23 goals and 43 points in 50 games, Camara gained interest as a free agent from the Swedish Hockey League, agreeing to a one-year contract with HV71 on April 20, 2019.

In the following 2019–20 season, Camara quickly adapted to the SHL and was among HV71 top regular season scorers. On February 6, 2020, he was signed to a two-year contract extension with HV71 through 2022. However on March 5, 2020, despite amassing 11 goals and 26 points through 42 regular season games, Camara's contract with HV71 was immediately terminated after a disciplinary matter.

Prior to the 2020–21 season, Camara was signed by HC Dynamo Pardubice of the Czech Extraliga.

Following two seasons in Czechia, Camara continued his journeyman career in agreeing to a one-year contract with Russian club, HC Neftekhimik Nizhnekamsk of the KHL on June 21, 2022.

After a lone season and second stint with the German top flight club, Iserlohn Roosters of the DEL, Camara opted to return to the KHL, agreeing to a one-year contract with Admiral Vladivostok on August 6, 2026.

== Career statistics ==
=== Regular season and playoffs ===
			Regular season					Playoffs
Season	Team	League	GP	G	A	Pts	PIM	GP	G	A	Pts	PIM
2009–10	Saginaw Spirit	OHL	65	6	6	12	96	6	1	1	2	5
2010–11	Saginaw Spirit	OHL	64	8	9	17	132	12	0	1	1	25
2011–12	Saginaw Spirit	OHL	35	7	12	19	76	—	—	—	—	—
2011–12	Barrie Colts	OHL	31	9	5	14	59	13	2	3	5	22
2012–13	Barrie Colts	OHL	50	36	24	60	91	16	9	7	16	42
2013–14	Providence Bruins	AHL	58	9	13	22	50	—	—	—	—	—
2014–15	Providence Bruins	AHL	59	3	5	8	32	—	—	—	—	—
2015–16	Providence Bruins	AHL	33	0	5	5	54	—	—	—	—	—
2015–16	Charlotte Checkers	AHL	15	3	5	8	17	—	—	—	—	—
2016–17	Kalamazoo Wings	ECHL	25	9	8	17	50	—	—	—	—	—
2016–17	St. John's IceCaps	AHL	23	3	5	8	8	3	0	0	0	4
2017–18	Odense Bulldogs	DEN	27	15	22	37	114	—	—	—	—	—
2017–18	Graz 99ers	EBEL	14	5	6	11	36	—	—	—	—	—
2017–18	Iserlohn Roosters	DEL	1	1	1	2	0	2	2	0	2	4
2018–19	Iserlohn Roosters	DEL	50	23	20	43	83	—	—	—	—	—
2019–20	HV71	SHL	42	11	15	26	59	—	—	—	—	—
2020–21	HC Dynamo Pardubice	ELH	44	21	14	35	52	8	4	4	8	28
2021–22	HC Dynamo Pardubice	ELH	48	22	14	36	88	8	0	2	2	6
2022–23	Neftekhimik Nizhnekamsk	KHL	65	14	17	31	47	4	0	2	2	4
2023–24	Neftekhimik Nizhnekamsk	KHL	25	3	6	9	18	—	—	—	—	—
2023–24	Barys Astana	KHL	34	11	7	18	46	—	—	—	—	—
2024–25	HK Nitra	Slovak	16	5	8	13	65	—	—	—	—	—
2024–25	Lada Togliatti	KHL	19	3	4	7	13	—	—	—	—	—
2025–26	Iserlohn Roosters	DEL	32	10	15	25	38	—	—	—	—	—
AHL totals			188	18	33	51	161	3	0	0	0	4
KHL totals			143	31	34	65	124	4	0	2	2	4

=== International ===
Year	Team	Event	Result	GP	G	A	Pts	PIM
2013	Canada	WJC	4th	6	0	2	2	31
Junior totals				6	0	2	2	31
