= Gemel Smith =

Canadian ice hockey player (born 1994)

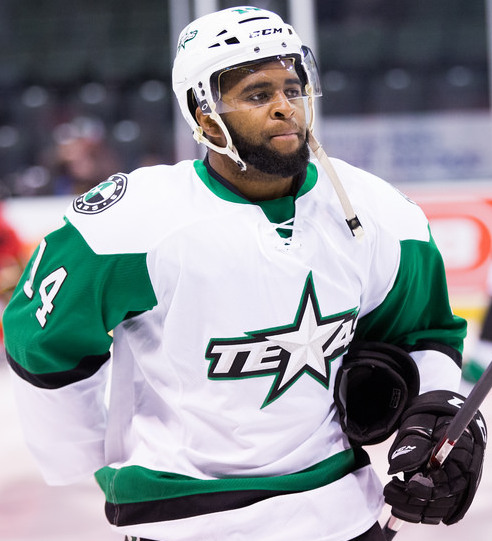
- Smith with the Texas Stars in 2015
- Born: April 16, 1994 (age 32) Toronto, Ontario, Canada
- Height: 5 ft 10 in (178 cm)
- Weight: 194 lb (88 kg; 13 st 12 lb)
- Position: Forward
- Shoots: Left
- team Former teams: Esbjerg Energy; Dallas Stars; Boston Bruins; Tampa Bay Lightning; Detroit Red Wings; Dinamo Minsk; Kunlun Red Star; Grizzlys Wolfsburg; HC 21 Prešov
- NHL draft: 104th overall, 2012; Dallas Stars
- Playing career: 2014–present

Gemel Smith (born April 16, 1994) is a Canadian professional ice hockey forward who is currently playing for the Esbjerg Energy of the Metal Ligaen. He most recently played for the Bridgeport Islanders of the American Hockey League (AHL). He has previously played in the National Hockey League (NHL) with the Dallas Stars, who selected him 104th overall in the 2012 NHL entry draft, as well as the Boston Bruins, Detroit Red Wings, and Tampa Bay Lightning.

== Playing career ==
Smith first played midget hockey with the Markham Majors before playing with the North York Rangers of the Greater Toronto Major Midget Hockey League before he was selected 120th overall in the Ontario Hockey League's 2010 OHL Priority Selection by the Owen Sound Attack. In his first major junior season in 2010–11 with the Attack he finished with 16 points in 66 games.

After completing his OHL career with the London Knights, he was signed by the Dallas Stars to a three-year, entry-level contract on May 31, 2014. He made his professional debut in the following 2014–15 season, after he was assigned by the Stars to their AHL affiliate, the Texas Stars. In 68 games with Texas, Smith contributed with 10 goals and 27 points in 68 games as a rookie.

In the 2016–17 season, with a rash of injuries suffered in Dallas, Smith received his first recall to the NHL on October 22, 2016. He made his NHL debut with the Stars that night, skating on the fourth-line in a 3–0 loss to the Columbus Blue Jackets. In his seventh game with the Stars, Smith scored his first two NHL goals in a 4–3 overtime loss to the Chicago Blackhawks on November 6, 2016.

On July 11, 2017, the Stars re-signed Smith to a one-year, two-way contract worth $650,000. In his first full season with the club, Smith recorded six goals and 11 points in 46 games, often finding himself as a healthy scratch.

On August 3, 2018, the Stars re-signed Smith to a one-year, $720,000 contract extension. During the 2018–19 season, on December 6, Smith was claimed on waivers by the Boston Bruins. Smith appeared in three games with Boston before he was re-assigned to Boston's AHL affiliate, the Providence Bruins, upon clearing waivers on December 19, 2018. In playing out his contract in Providence, Smith was an offensive presence, contributing 40 points in 47 games.

As an impending restricted free agent, Smith was not tendered a qualifying offer by the Bruins, releasing him as an unrestricted free agent on June 25, 2019. He signed a one-year, two-way contract with the Tampa Bay Lightning on July 8, 2019.

Smith was one of the eight players called up to the Lightning for their training camp prior to the 2020 Stanley Cup playoffs.

Following back-to-back championships with the Lightning, Smith began the 2021–22 season on the long-term injured reserve. After returning to health, Smith was claimed on waivers from the Lightning by the Detroit Red Wings on January 19, 2022. He was assigned by the Red Wings to a conditioning stint with their AHL affiliate, the Grand Rapids Griffins, on January 23, 2022.

On February 19, 2022, the Lightning reclaimed Smith from the Red Wings, again on waivers.

In the following 2022–23 season, Smith remained within the Lightning organization, continuing with the Syracuse Crunch. While placing third in team scoring, collecting 37 points through 35 games, Smith left the Crunch as he was re-assigned on loan by the Lightning to the Vegas Golden Knights' AHL affiliate, the Henderson Silver Knights, on February 16, 2023. He played out the season in Henderson, posting 5 goals and 16 points through 19 games.

As a free agent from the Lightning, Smith paused his career in North America and was signed to a one-year contract with Belarusian club, HC Dinamo Minsk of the KHL, on July 20, 2023. In the 2023–24 season, Smith collected 4 goals through just 15 appearances with Dinamo before he was released from his contract and promptly signed for the remainder of the season with Chinese KHL outfit, Kunlun Red Star, on November 29, 2023.

Returning to North America following the conclusion of his contract with Kunlun, Smith as a free agent leading into the 2024–25 season opted to return to the Syracuse Crunch organization, in signing a PTO on October 8, 2024. His third stint with the Crunch was short lived as he was released from his PTO after only 7 appearances, registering 4 points, on October 29, 2024. He continued in the AHL, on December 13, 2024, signing a tryout with the Bridgeport Islanders, the primary affiliate to the New York Islanders.

== Personal life ==
Smith is of Jamaican descent through both parents. His younger brother, Givani, was drafted by the Detroit Red Wings in the second round of the 2016 NHL entry draft, and currently plays for the Colorado Avalanche.

During the 2018–19 NHL season, Smith was battling depression-like symptoms and had a hard time sleeping. He said he "made himself go into a sunken place". While with the Boston Bruins, Patrice Bergeron suggested he get help.

== Career statistics ==
=== Regular season and playoffs ===
			Regular season					Playoffs
Season	Team	League	GP	G	A	Pts	PIM	GP	G	A	Pts	PIM
2010–11	Owen Sound Attack	OHL	66	8	8	16	14	—	—	—	—	—
2011–12	Owen Sound Attack	OHL	68	21	39	60	51	5	1	2	3	10
2012–13	Owen Sound Attack	OHL	61	23	29	52	54	12	7	3	10	10
2013–14	Owen Sound Attack	OHL	40	26	22	48	37	—	—	—	—	—
2013–14	London Knights	OHL	29	11	16	27	10	9	3	9	12	9
2014–15	Texas Stars	AHL	68	10	17	27	38	—	—	—	—	—
2015–16	Texas Stars	AHL	65	13	13	26	24	3	0	0	0	2
2015–16	Idaho Steelheads	ECHL	4	1	3	4	2	—	—	—	—	—
2016–17	Texas Stars	AHL	53	12	21	33	44	—	—	—	—	—
2016–17	Dallas Stars	NHL	17	3	3	6	21	—	—	—	—	—
2017–18	Dallas Stars	NHL	46	6	5	11	17	—	—	—	—	—
2018–19	Dallas Stars	NHL	14	2	1	3	0	—	—	—	—	—
2018–19	Boston Bruins	NHL	3	0	0	0	0	—	—	—	—	—
2018–19	Providence Bruins	AHL	47	16	24	40	32	2	0	0	0	0
2019–20	Tampa Bay Lightning	NHL	3	1	0	1	4	—	—	—	—	—
2019–20	Syracuse Crunch	AHL	50	22	18	40	50	—	—	—	—	—
2020–21	Tampa Bay Lightning	NHL	5	0	3	3	11	—	—	—	—	—
2020–21	Syracuse Crunch	AHL	3	3	3	6	7	—	—	—	—	—
2021–22	Grand Rapids Griffins	AHL	3	0	1	1	8	—	—	—	—	—
2021–22	Detroit Red Wings	NHL	3	0	1	1	5	—	—	—	—	—
2021–22	Syracuse Crunch	AHL	13	5	3	8	2	3	1	0	1	0
2022–23	Syracuse Crunch	AHL	35	13	24	37	89	—	—	—	—	—
2022–23	Henderson Silver Knights	AHL	19	5	11	16	56	—	—	—	—	—
2023–24	Dinamo Minsk	KHL	15	4	1	5	11	—	—	—	—	—
2023–24	Kunlun Red Star	KHL	20	3	6	9	2	—	—	—	—	—
2024–25	Syracuse Crunch	AHL	7	1	3	4	0	—	—	—	—	—
2024–25	Bridgeport Islanders	AHL	23	5	10	15	48	—	—	—	—	—
2025–26	Grizzlys Wolfsburg	DEL	19	8	2	10	10	3	1	0	1	5
NHL totals			91	12	13	25	58	—	—	—	—	—

=== International ===
Year	Team	Event	GP	G	A	Pts	PIM
2012	Canada	U18	7	2	3	5	2
Junior totals			7	2	3	5	2
