= Kurtis Gabriel =

Canadian ice hockey player

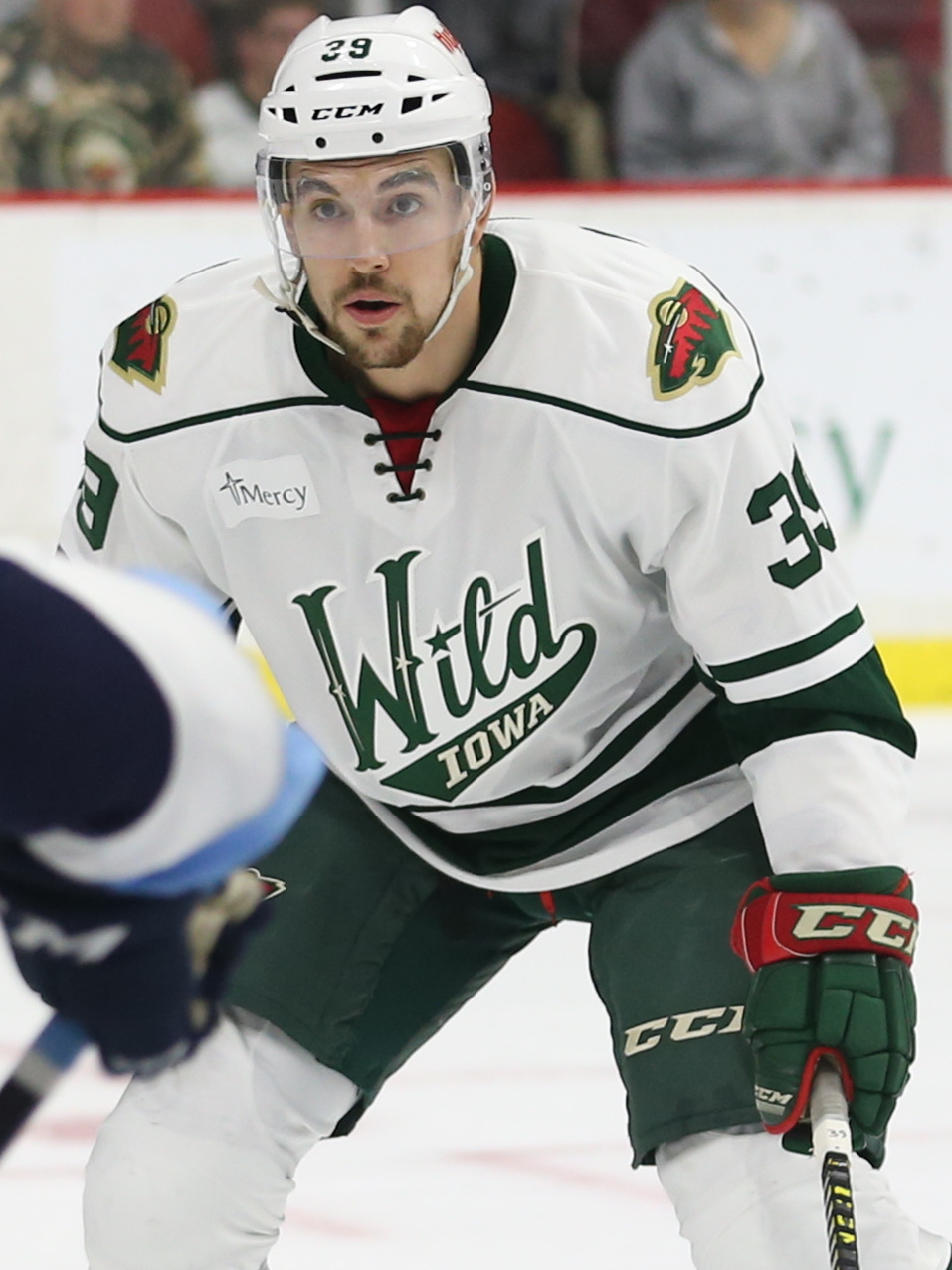
- Gabriel with the Iowa Wild in 2015
- Born: April 20, 1993 (age 33) Newmarket, Ontario, Canada
- Height: 6 ft 4 in (193 cm)
- Weight: 215 lb (98 kg; 15 st 5 lb)
- Position: Right wing
- Shot: Right
- Played for: Minnesota Wild; New Jersey Devils; San Jose Sharks; Chicago Blackhawks
- NHL draft: 81st overall, 2013; Minnesota Wild
- Playing career: 2014–2022

Kurtis Gabriel (born April 20, 1993) is a Canadian former professional ice hockey player. A forward, he is mostly known as an enforcer.

After being passed over in the NHL entry draft during his first two years of eligibility, Gabriel was selected by the Minnesota Wild in the 3rd round (81st overall) of the 2013 NHL entry draft. He made his NHL debut with the Wild on November 10, 2015, but spent most of his tenure with their AHL affiliate, the Iowa Wild. He concluded his nearly five season tenure with the team following the 2017–18 season, where he subsequently signed with the New Jersey Devils. Although Gabriel only spent one season with the Devils organization, he became the first NHL player to use Pride Tape outside of NHL designated Pride Nights. His advocacy work for the local community earned him the IOA/American Specialty AHL Man of the Year with the Wild and Phantoms.

== Early life and education ==
Gabriel was born on April 20, 1993, in Newmarket, Ontario, Canada, to mother Kim. His mother and maternal grandparents are of Scottish heritage. His parents split up by the time he was six years old. Growing up, he played hockey, baseball, basketball, volleyball, and ultimate frisbee. By the age of 10, Gabriel was playing Triple-A level hockey, until his father died by suicide and he dropped two divisions. He would later collaborate with the Shared Grief Project as a result of his father's suicide.

== Playing career ==
=== Amateur ===
While attending Dr. John M. Denison Secondary School, Gabriel was convinced by a friend to pursue hockey as a career. At that point, he had been splitting his time between baseball, soccer, and hockey and was considering pursuing a college basketball scholarship. He began playing for the AAA midgets Markham Waxers and York-Simcoe Express before earning an invite to the Jr. A Newmarket Hurricanes and Georgina Ice Jr. C evaluation camp. While participating in the Georgina Ice evaluation camp in Georgina, Ontario, he impressed the Ontario Hockey League's (OHL) Owen Sound Attack scout Bryan Denney and was invited to their development camp.

Gabriel ended up playing four seasons in the OHL from 2010 to 2014, all with the Owen Sound Attack. Gabriel played in 40 games for Owen Sound during his rookie campaign and recorded four points. After his first season in the OHL, Gabriel was not drafted at the 2011 NHL entry draft but attended the Phoenix Coyotes Rookie Camp as a free agent invitee. Due to the 2012–13 NHL lockout, Gabriel was also not offered an invite to a rookie camp the following season, following a 17-point campaign. When he returned to Owen Sound prior to the 2012–13 season, he began his first breakout season. By December, he had earned the Attacker of the Week award for helping the team win in a shootout against the Plymouth Whalers, and later scoring the team's only goal in a 4–1 loss to the same team. Although Gabriel concluded the 2012–13 season with a career-high 13 goals and 15 assists for 28 points, he was left off the NHL Central Scouting Bureau's final ranking. In spite of being passed over in his first two years of eligibility, the Minnesota Wild eventually drafted him 81st overall in the 2013 NHL entry draft.

In his final session of major junior hockey, Gabriel was named an alternate captain and once again set a new career high in goals, assists, and points. On March 3, 2014, the Minnesota Wild signed Gabriel to a three-year entry-level contract. As the Owen Sound Attack qualified for the OHL playoffs, Gabriel was coming off a 10-game point streak. During the first round of the OHL playoffs, Gabriel recorded one assist in an eventual loss to the Sault Ste. Marie Greyhounds.

=== Professional ===
After the Owen Sound Attack were eliminated from the OHL playoffs, Gabriel was reassigned to the Minnesota Wild's American Hockey League (AHL) affiliate, the Iowa Wild. He recorded his first AHL goal on April 16, 2014, in a 4–3 shootout loss to the Chicago Wolves, and ended the season with four points in eight games.

Following a successful eight games in the 2013–14 season, Gabriel was invited to participate at the Minnesota Wild's Training Camp prior to the 2014–15 season. He eventually began his first full professional season with the Iowa Wild, where he recorded seven goals and 16 points overall in 67 games. This gained attention from the National Hockey League and he was invited to participate in the Minnesota Wild's September training camp prior to the 2015–16 season. Although he was unable to crack the Wild's lineup to begin the season, Gabriel made his NHL debut on November 10, 2015, in a game against the Winnipeg Jets before being reassigned the following day. At the end of the regular season, the Iowa Wild named him their Insurance Office of America (IOA)/American Specialty AHL Man of the Year for his "outstanding contributions to the Des Moines community during the 2015–16 season." As the Iowa Wild failed to qualify for the 2016 Calder Cup playoffs, he made his first Stanley Cup playoffs appearance with the Minnesota Wild against the Dallas Stars on April 18.

Gabriel spent the majority of the 2016–17 season with the Iowa Wild, only playing 13 games in the NHL. On February 27, 2017, Gabriel was suspended for six AHL games as the result of off ice actions taken place two days prior. Despite this, Gabriel ended the season with 10 points in 40 games for the Wild and accrued 68 penalty minutes. He signed a one-year contract with the Minnesota Wild on July 10, 2017.

During the 2017–18 season, Gabriel endured a partial cut to his median nerve and damage to a major muscle and a ligament in his wrist, as the result of accidentally falling on a skate blade. He underwent surgery three days after the game and was expected to return to the lineup before the season concluded. He eventually returned to the Wild's lineup in February 2018, for their games against Chicago and Rockford. Upon returning, he spent the entirety of the season in the AHL and was unable earn a recall to Minnesota through the 2017–18 season. As a result, Gabriel left the Wild organization as a free agent during the offseason and signed a one-year, two-way contract with the New Jersey Devils on July 2, 2018.

Following training camp, Gabriel was assigned to the Devils AHL affiliate, the Binghamton Devils, to begin the 2018–19 season. He was then recalled to the NHL. On February 21, 2019, he scored his first NHL goal with the Devils against the Ottawa Senators, in a 4–0 win. He later received a one-game suspension for boarding Philadelphia Flyers player Nolan Patrick during a game; it was a short suspension as a result of it being his first-time offence. During the game, Gabriel was only assessed a five-minute boarding major penalty and Patrick later elbowed him in the head causing him to leave the ice. Gabriel concluded his only season with the New Jersey Devils, recording four points in 22 games. On July 1, 2019, Gabriel left the Devils as a free agent to sign a one-year, two-way contract with the Philadelphia Flyers.

Following the Flyers' 2019 training camp, Gabriel was assigned to their American Hockey League affiliate, the Lehigh Valley Phantoms, to begin the season.

As an unrestricted free agent following the 2019–20 season, Gabriel signed a one-year, two-way contract with the San Jose Sharks on November 2, 2020. His debut for the Sharks came in a 2–6 loss to the Los Angeles Kings on February 12, 2021. During a later game, Gabriel was fined $3,017.24, the maximum allowable under the Collective Bargaining Agreement, for cross-checking a member of the Kings during warm-ups. At the conclusion of the season, Gabriel was named a finalist for the King Clancy Memorial Trophy as "an NHL player who best exemplifies leadership qualities on and off the ice and who has made a significant humanitarian contribution to his community."

On July 28, 2021, he signed a one-year, $750,000 deal as a free agent with the Toronto Maple Leafs. However, he spent the first several months of the season with the Maple Leafs' AHL affiliate, the Toronto Marlies; he was then traded to the Chicago Blackhawks on December 9, 2021, in exchange for defenceman Chad Krys, without playing a game for the Maple Leafs.

After spending the majority of the 2021–22 season in the AHL, Gabriel announced his retirement from professional hockey on September 19, 2022.

== Pride Tape and activism ==
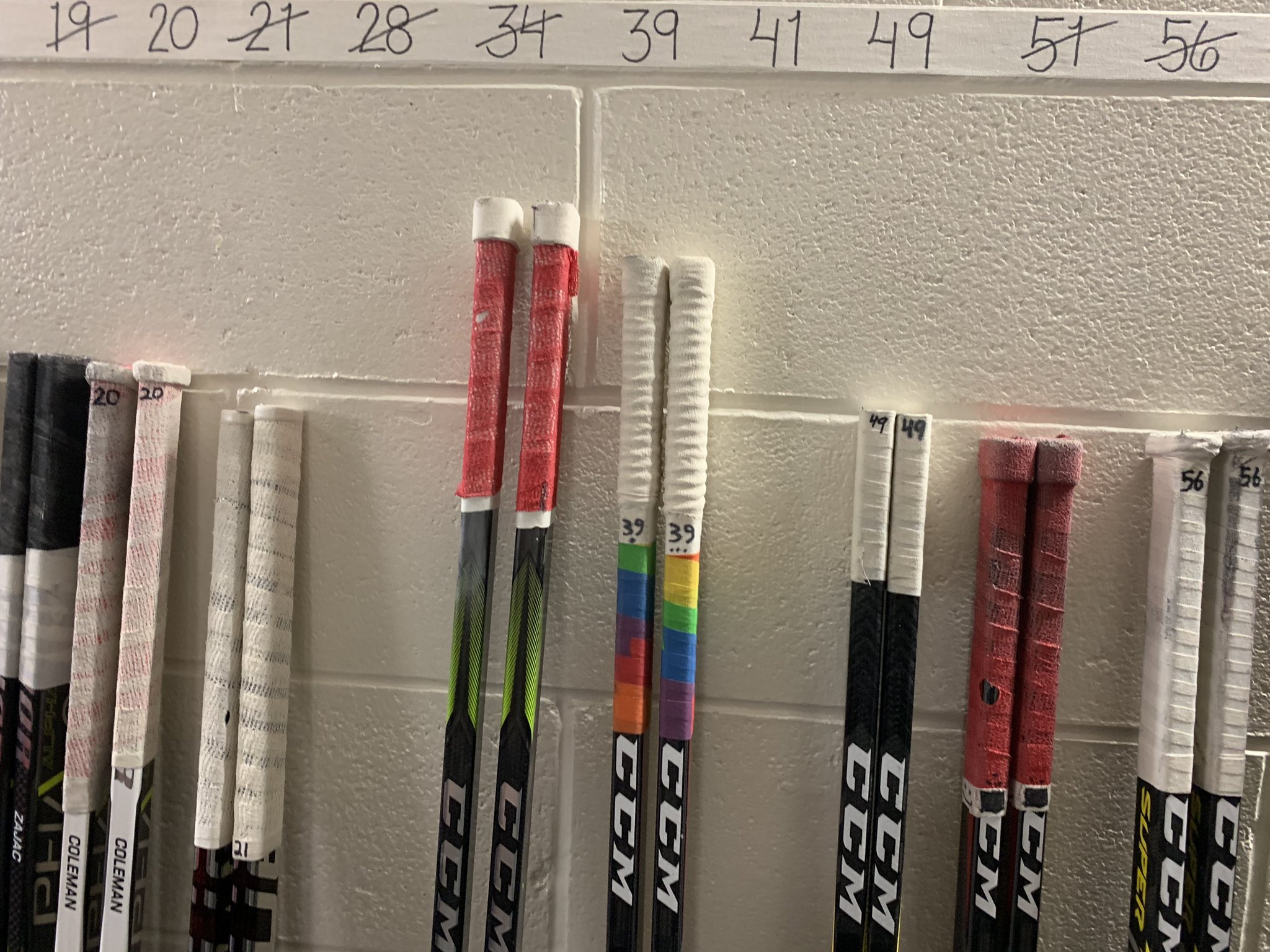
A photo of Gabriel's stick with Pride Tape on it during the 2018–19 season.

In 2019, he became the first NHL player to play a game while using Pride Tape and continue to use it past Pride Night. That year, the New Jersey Devils hosted a themed Pride Night on February 25. Players were provided with Pride Tape to decorate their sticks and gear during warmups. Gabriel did not remove the tape from his stick after warmups, and he still had the tape on his stick when he scored the winning goal that night against the Montreal Canadiens. The game was nationally televised in Canada.

After the positive response, Gabriel continued to use the tape. He has also spoken about being shocked to learn that the friend of an ex-girlfriend was alienated by her family after coming out and how he wanted to do something to help.

During his first season with the Flyers organization in 2019 while playing with the Lehigh Valley Phantoms, Gabriel continued to be the only player in the AHL to use Pride Tape during every game beyond Pride Night. He also became the Phantoms You Can Play project ambassador and was part of a feature story on WFMZ-TV about inclusion in hockey. As a result, he was named the Phantoms 2020 IOA/American Specialty AHL Man of the Year.

== Player profile ==
Gabriel has been described as an enforcer but has shown the ability to score points when needed. One of the main critiques of his game growing up was his lack of skating ability.

When the New Jersey Devils signed Gabriel to a one-year contract, coach John Hynes spoke highly of Gabriel as a player:

He's a guy who brings attributes that a lot of other players don't...He brings toughness, he brings physicality, he's got good hands, he's defensively responsible, he can finish and when he finishes he hits through people. He's definitely a presence.

== Career statistics ==
			Regular season					Playoffs
Season	Team	League	GP	G	A	Pts	PIM	GP	G	A	Pts	PIM
2010–11	Owen Sound Attack	OHL	40	1	3	4	20	—	—	—	—	—
2011–12	Owen Sound Attack	OHL	65	4	13	17	72	4	0	0	0	0
2012–13	Owen Sound Attack	OHL	67	13	15	28	100	12	3	2	5	34
2013–14	Owen Sound Attack	OHL	60	16	35	51	99	5	0	1	1	22
2013–14	Iowa Wild	AHL	8	2	2	4	15	—	—	—	—	—
2014–15	Iowa Wild	AHL	67	7	9	16	125	—	—	—	—	—
2015–16	Iowa Wild	AHL	66	6	4	10	137	—	—	—	—	—
2015–16	Minnesota Wild	NHL	3	0	0	0	10	4	0	0	0	0
2016–17	Iowa Wild	AHL	49	8	2	10	68	—	—	—	—	—
2016–17	Minnesota Wild	NHL	13	0	1	1	29	—	—	—	—	—
2017–18	Iowa Wild	AHL	42	3	5	8	43	—	—	—	—	—
2018–19	Binghamton Devils	AHL	32	2	4	6	28	—	—	—	—	—
2018–19	New Jersey Devils	NHL	22	2	2	4	59	—	—	—	—	—
2019–20	Lehigh Valley Phantoms	AHL	53	5	4	9	92	—	—	—	—	—
2020–21	San Jose Sharks	NHL	11	0	0	0	55	—	—	—	—	—
2020–21	San Jose Barracuda	AHL	2	2	1	3	11	—	—	—	—	—
2021–22	Toronto Marlies	AHL	13	1	1	2	36	—	—	—	—	—
2021–22	Chicago Blackhawks	NHL	2	0	0	0	0	—	—	—	—	—
2021–22	Rockford IceHogs	AHL	39	3	1	4	84	5	0	0	0	12
NHL totals			51	2	3	5	153	4	0	0	0	0

== Awards and honours ==
Award	Year	Ref
AHL
IOA/American Specialty AHL Man of the Year	2016, 2020	
