= Joseph Cramarossa =

Canadian ice hockey player (born 1992)

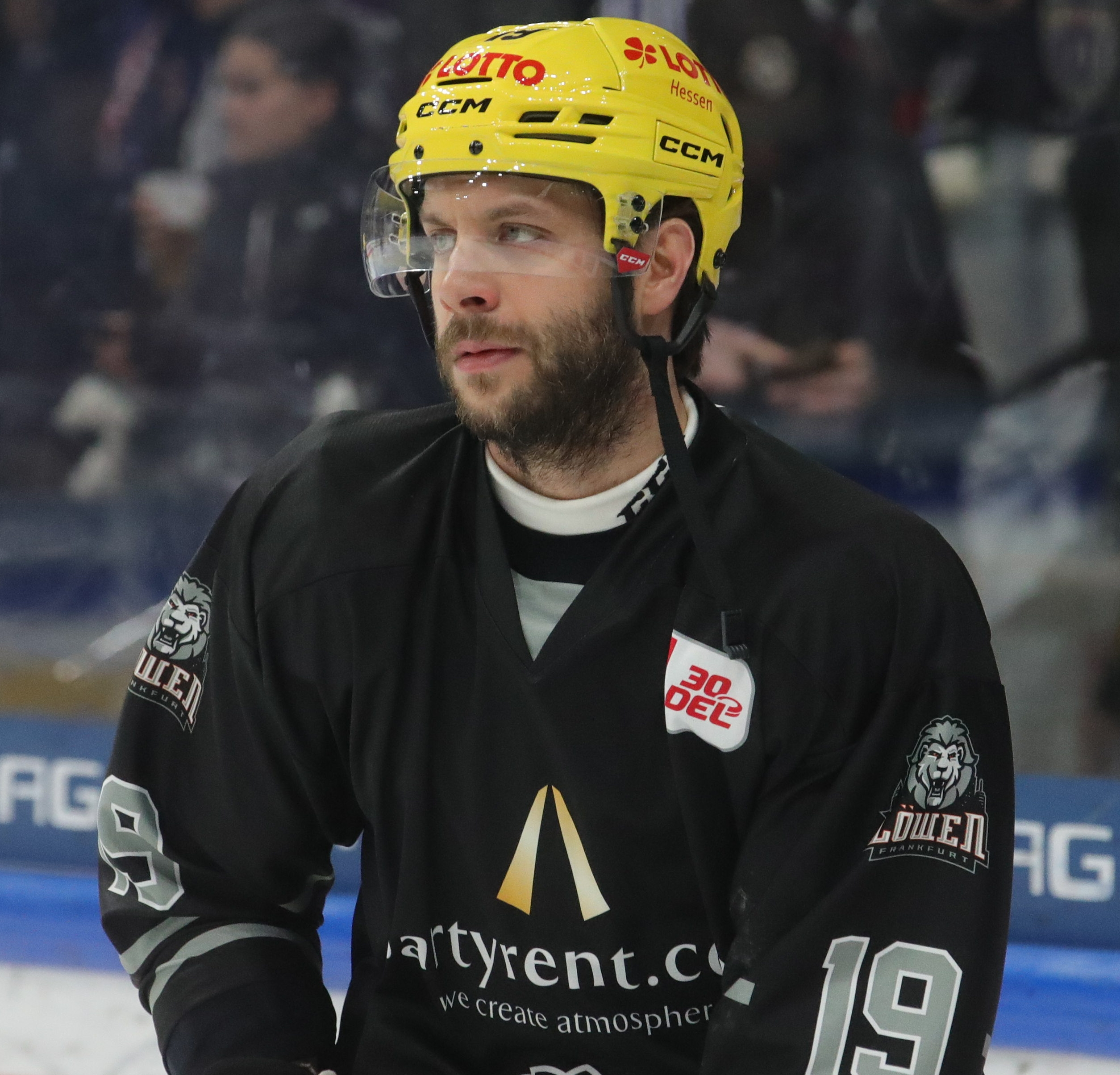
- Cramarossa with the Löwen Frankfurt in 2023
- Born: October 26, 1992 (age 33) Markham, Ontario, Canada
- Height: 6 ft 1 in (185 cm)
- Weight: 192 lb (87 kg; 13 st 10 lb)
- Position: Left wing
- Shoots: Left
- DEL team Former teams: Augsburger Panther; Anaheim Ducks; Vancouver Canucks; Minnesota Wild; Adler Mannheim; Löwen Frankfurt; Vienna Capitals
- NHL draft: 65th overall, 2011; Anaheim Ducks
- Playing career: 2013–present

Joseph Cramarossa (born October 26, 1992) is a Canadian professional ice hockey forward for Augsburger Panther in the Deutsche Eishockey Liga (DEL).

== Playing career ==
On March 2, 2013, he was signed by the Ducks to a three-year, entry-level contract. He made his professional debut in the 2013–14 season, after he was assigned by the Ducks to AHL affiliate, the Norfolk Admirals. In 47 games with the Admirals, Cramarossa contributed with 4 points as a rookie.

Cramarossa built upon his previous successful season by impressing returning coach Randy Carlyle in the Ducks training camp and pre-season to be named on Anaheim's opening night roster for the 2016–17 season. He was soon returned on loan to the Gulls without featuring with the Ducks, on October 14, 2016. Having made his season debut with the Gulls, Cramarossa received his first NHL recall on October 22, 2016. He made his NHL debut in the Ducks home opener, in a 4–2 victory over the Vancouver Canucks on October 23, 2016. Cramarossa scored his first NHL goal in a 4–0 win over the Los Angeles Kings on November 1, 2016.

On September 11, 2017, the Calgary Flames signed Cramarossa to a professional tryout to attend training camp. He was later released by the Flames on September 27, 2017, but signed an AHL contract with the Stockton Heat, the Flames' AHL affiliate, the next day. On February 14, 2018, Cramarossa was traded by the Heat to the Wilkes-Barre/Scranton Penguins in exchange for Colin Smith.

On July 12, 2018, the Penguins re-signed Cramarossa to a one-year extension. On February 20, 2019, the Pittsburgh Penguins signed Cramarossa to a two-way contract for the remainder of the 2018–19 season. Cramarossa spent the entirety of the season in Wilkes-Barre/Scranton, recording 16 points in 56 games.

On April 27, 2019, the Penguins re-signed Cramarossa to a one-year, two-way contract for the 2019–20 season. Cramarossa played in nine games with Wilkes-Barre, before he was traded by the Penguins to the Chicago Blackhawks in exchange for Graham Knott on November 20, 2019. He was directly assigned to the Blackhawks' AHL affiliate, the Rockford IceHogs.

Continuing his career in the DEL for the 2023–24 season, Cramarossa signed a one-year contract with Löwen Frankfurt on July 24, 2023.

On July 18, 2025, Cramarossa returned to the DEL in signing a one-year contract with Augsburger Panther for the 2025–26 season.

== Career statistics ==
			Regular season					Playoffs
Season	Team	League	GP	G	A	Pts	PIM	GP	G	A	Pts	PIM
2008–09	Markham Waxers	OJHL	38	7	3	10	14	12	1	2	3	0
2009–10	Mississauga St. Michael's Majors	OHL	64	6	10	16	60	14	0	2	2	11
2010–11	Mississauga St. Michael's Majors	OHL	59	12	20	32	101	14	2	2	4	6
2011–12	Mississauga St. Michael's Majors	OHL	15	6	5	11	40	—	—	—	—	—
2011–12	Belleville Bulls	OHL	29	8	8	16	43	6	2	2	4	18
2012–13	Belleville Bulls	OHL	68	19	44	63	89	17	5	4	9	35
2013–14	Norfolk Admirals	AHL	47	1	3	4	52	2	0	0	0	0
2013–14	Utah Grizzlies	ECHL	3	0	2	2	7	—	—	—	—	—
2014–15	Norfolk Admirals	AHL	54	5	5	10	75	—	—	—	—	—
2015–16	San Diego Gulls	AHL	61	11	6	17	68	9	3	0	3	6
2016–17	San Diego Gulls	AHL	2	0	0	0	8	—	—	—	—	—
2016–17	Anaheim Ducks	NHL	49	4	6	10	51	—	—	—	—	—
2016–17	Vancouver Canucks	NHL	10	0	0	0	9	—	—	—	—	—
2017–18	Stockton Heat	AHL	37	3	7	10	38	—	—	—	—	—
2017–18	Wilkes-Barre/Scranton Penguins	AHL	28	6	6	12	28	3	1	0	1	2
2018–19	Wilkes-Barre/Scranton Penguins	AHL	56	4	12	16	116	—	—	—	—	—
2019–20	Wilkes-Barre/Scranton Penguins	AHL	9	2	1	3	16	—	—	—	—	—
2019–20	Rockford IceHogs	AHL	42	5	7	12	110	—	—	—	—	—
2020–21	Iowa Wild	AHL	8	2	1	3	9	—	—	—	—	—
2020–21	Minnesota Wild	NHL	4	0	1	1	15	—	—	—	—	—
2021–22	Iowa Wild	AHL	51	10	9	19	62	—	—	—	—	—
2021–22	Minnesota Wild	NHL	1	0	1	1	2	—	—	—	—	—
2022–23	Iowa Wild	AHL	18	4	5	9	47	—	—	—	—	—
2022–23	Minnesota Wild	NHL	4	1	0	1	4	—	—	—	—	—
2022–23	Adler Mannheim	DEL	15	2	6	8	11	7	0	1	1	7
2023–24	Löwen Frankfurt	DEL	46	10	17	27	39	—	—	—	—	—
2024–25	Vienna Capitals	ICEHL	32	8	15	23	32	3	0	0	0	12
NHL totals			68	5	8	13	81	—	—	—	—	—
