= Tyler Graovac =

Canadian ice hockey player (born 1993)

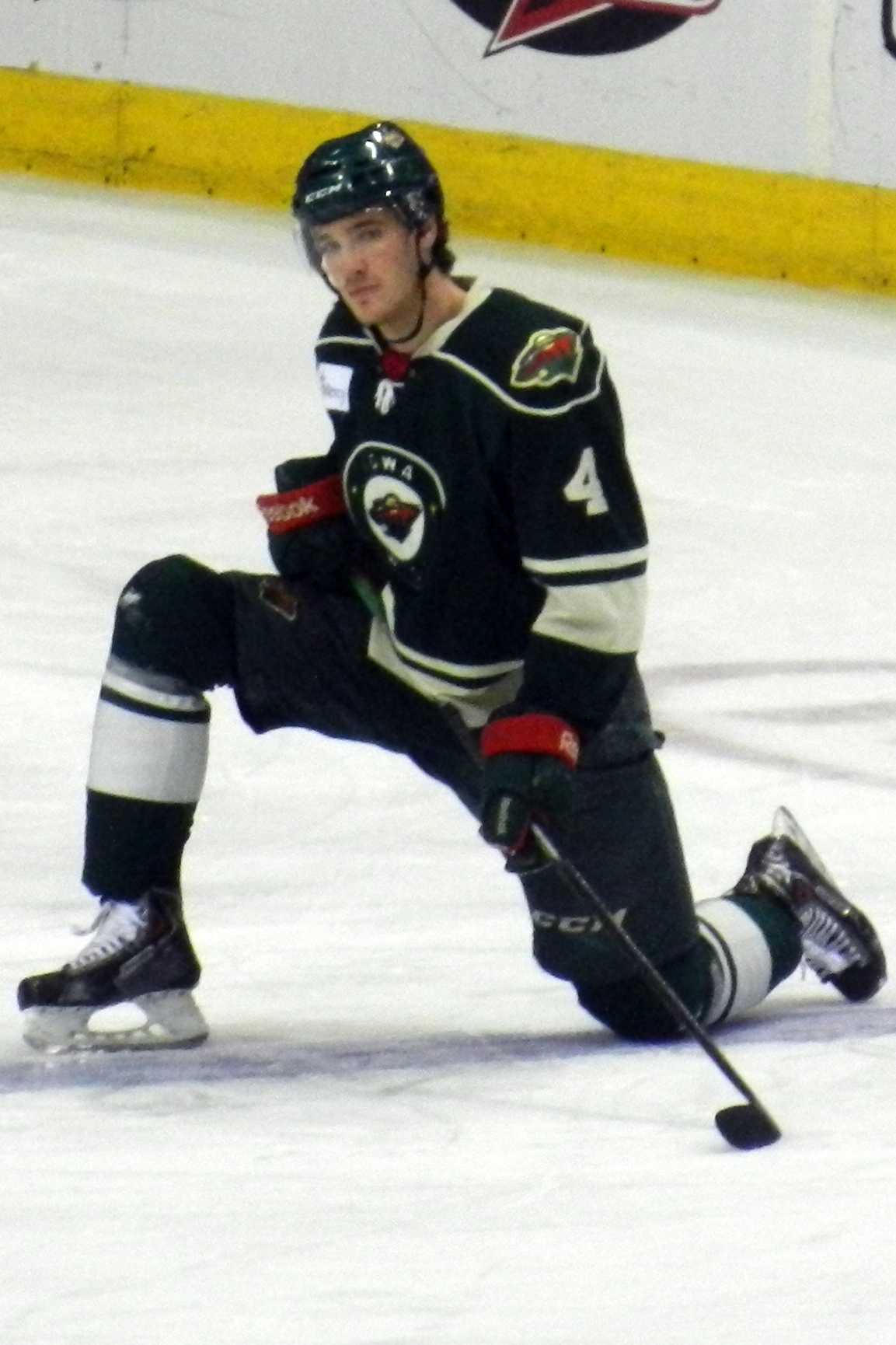
- Graovac with the Iowa Wild in 2014
- Born: April 27, 1993 (age 33) Brampton, Ontario, Canada
- Height: 6 ft 5 in (196 cm)
- Weight: 212 lb (96 kg; 15 st 2 lb)
- Position: Centre
- Shoots: Left
- KHL team Former teams: Free agent Minnesota Wild; Washington Capitals; Vancouver Canucks; Dinamo Minsk; Vityaz Podolsk; Admiral Vladivostok; Kunlun Red Star; Lada Togliatti
- NHL draft: 191st overall, 2011; Minnesota Wild
- Playing career: 2013–present

Tyler Graovac (born April 27, 1993) is a Canadian professional ice hockey player. He is currently an unrestricted free agent. He most recently played for HC Lada Togliatti of the Kontinental Hockey League (KHL). Graovac was selected by the Minnesota Wild in the 7th round (191st overall) of the 2011 NHL entry draft.

== Playing career ==
Graovac played four seasons of major junior hockey in the Ontario Hockey League (OHL) with the Ottawa 67's and Belleville Bulls, registering a total of 58 goals, 72 assists, and 76 penalty minutes, in 228 OHL games. He was recognized for his outstanding play when, following his final year, he was awarded the William Hanley Trophy as the OHL's most sportsmanlike player, and was further honoured when he was named 2012–13 Canadian Hockey League (CHL) Sportsman of the Year.

On April 2, 2013, the Minnesota Wild signed Graovac to a three-year, two-way entry-level contract worth $750,000.

In the 2014–15 season, his second professional season, Graovac made his NHL debut with the Wild on December 29, 2014 against the Winnipeg Jets.

On October 5, 2016, he was placed on waivers by the Wild.

On June 14, 2017, he was traded by the Wild to the Washington Capitals in exchange for a fifth-round pick in the 2018 NHL entry draft. Graovac opened the 2017–18 season on the Capitals roster, however appeared in just 5 scoreless games before he was waived and reassigned to AHL affiliate, the Hershey Bears for the remainder of the season.

On July 1, 2018, having left the Capitals as a free agent, Graovac was signed to a one-year, two-way contract with the Calgary Flames. In the 2018–19 season, Graovac played exclusively with the Flames' AHL affiliate, the Stockton Heat. In 65 games with the Heat, he led the team with 24 goals, finishing second in points with 50.

Unable to earn a recall with the Flames, Graovac left as a free agent at the conclusion of his contract. On July 1, 2019, Graovac agreed to a one-year, two-way contract with fellow Canadian club, the Vancouver Canucks. Following the Canucks training camp, Graovac was sent to their AHL affiliate, the Utica Comets. He was recalled to the Canucks on November 13. Graovac scored two goals in eight games with the Canucks before leaving a December 1 game against the Edmonton Oilers due to a long-term lower-body injury.

On December 13, 2020, the Vancouver Canucks re-signed Graovac to a one-year, two-way contract. After attending the Canucks training camp, Graovac was initially assigned to the Utica Comets. On January 20, 2021, Graovac was re-assigned by the Canucks to the Winnipeg Jets AHL affiliate, the Manitoba Moose, due to shorter quarantine recall regulations. He contributed with 9 points in as many games with the Moose before returning to the Canucks and contributing with 3 goals and 4 points in 14 games.

As a free agent from the Canucks, Graovac left the NHL and signed his first contract abroad in agreeing to a one-year deal with Belarusian based club, HC Dinamo Minsk of the KHL, on July 26, 2021.

At the conclusion of his contract with Minsk, Graovac continued in the KHL in joining Russian based club, HC Vityaz, on a one-year contract on July 27, 2022.

Graovac continued his tenure in the KHL following his departure from Vityaz as a free agent, signing a one-year contract for the 2023–24 season with Admiral Vladivostok on June 21, 2023. Graovac made 20 appearances with Admiral before he was traded to Chinese KHL outfit, Kunlun Red Star, in exchange for Cliff Pu on November 29, 2023.

== Career statistics ==
			Regular season					Playoffs
Season	Team	League	GP	G	A	Pts	PIM	GP	G	A	Pts	PIM
2009–10	Ottawa 67's	OHL	52	2	7	9	17	12	0	0	0	2
2010–11	Ottawa 67's	OHL	66	10	11	21	10	—	—	—	—	—
2011–12	Ottawa 67's	OHL	50	8	19	27	31	18	4	6	10	12
2012–13	Ottawa 67's	OHL	30	21	14	35	8	—	—	—	—	—
2012–13	Belleville Bulls	OHL	30	17	21	38	10	15	6	16	22	17
2013–14	Iowa Wild	AHL	64	13	12	25	29	—	—	—	—	—
2014–15	Iowa Wild	AHL	73	21	25	46	26	—	—	—	—	—
2014–15	Minnesota Wild	NHL	3	0	0	0	0	—	—	—	—	—
2015–16	Minnesota Wild	NHL	2	0	0	0	0	—	—	—	—	—
2015–16	Iowa Wild	AHL	39	5	11	16	20	—	—	—	—	—
2016–17	Iowa Wild	AHL	26	10	5	15	15	—	—	—	—	—
2016–17	Minnesota Wild	NHL	52	7	2	9	10	—	—	—	—	—
2017–18	Washington Capitals	NHL	5	0	0	0	2	—	—	—	—	—
2017–18	Hershey Bears	AHL	53	12	17	29	12	—	—	—	—	—
2018–19	Stockton Heat	AHL	65	24	26	50	37	—	—	—	—	—
2019–20	Utica Comets	AHL	11	2	1	3	2	—	—	—	—	—
2019–20	Vancouver Canucks	NHL	8	2	0	2	2	—	—	—	—	—
2020–21	Manitoba Moose	AHL	9	2	7	9	0	—	—	—	—	—
2020–21	Vancouver Canucks	NHL	14	3	1	4	6	—	—	—	—	—
2021–22	Dinamo Minsk	KHL	44	11	15	26	24	4	0	1	1	4
2022–23	HC Vityaz	KHL	49	9	11	20	12	3	0	0	0	2
2023–24	Admiral Vladivostok	KHL	20	3	1	4	42	—	—	—	—	—
2023–24	Kunlun Red Star	KHL	30	7	8	15	14	—	—	—	—	—
2024–25	Kunlun Red Star	KHL	67	15	21	36	28	—	—	—	—	—
2025–26	Lada Togliatti	KHL	19	5	3	8	4	—	—	—	—	—
NHL totals			84	12	3	15	20	—	—	—	—	—
KHL totals			229	50	59	109	124	7	0	1	1	6

== Awards and honours ==
Award	Year
OHL
William Hanley Trophy - Most Sportsmanlike Player	2012–13
CHL Sportsman of the Year	2012–13
