= Alan Quine =

Canadian ice hockey player (born 1993)

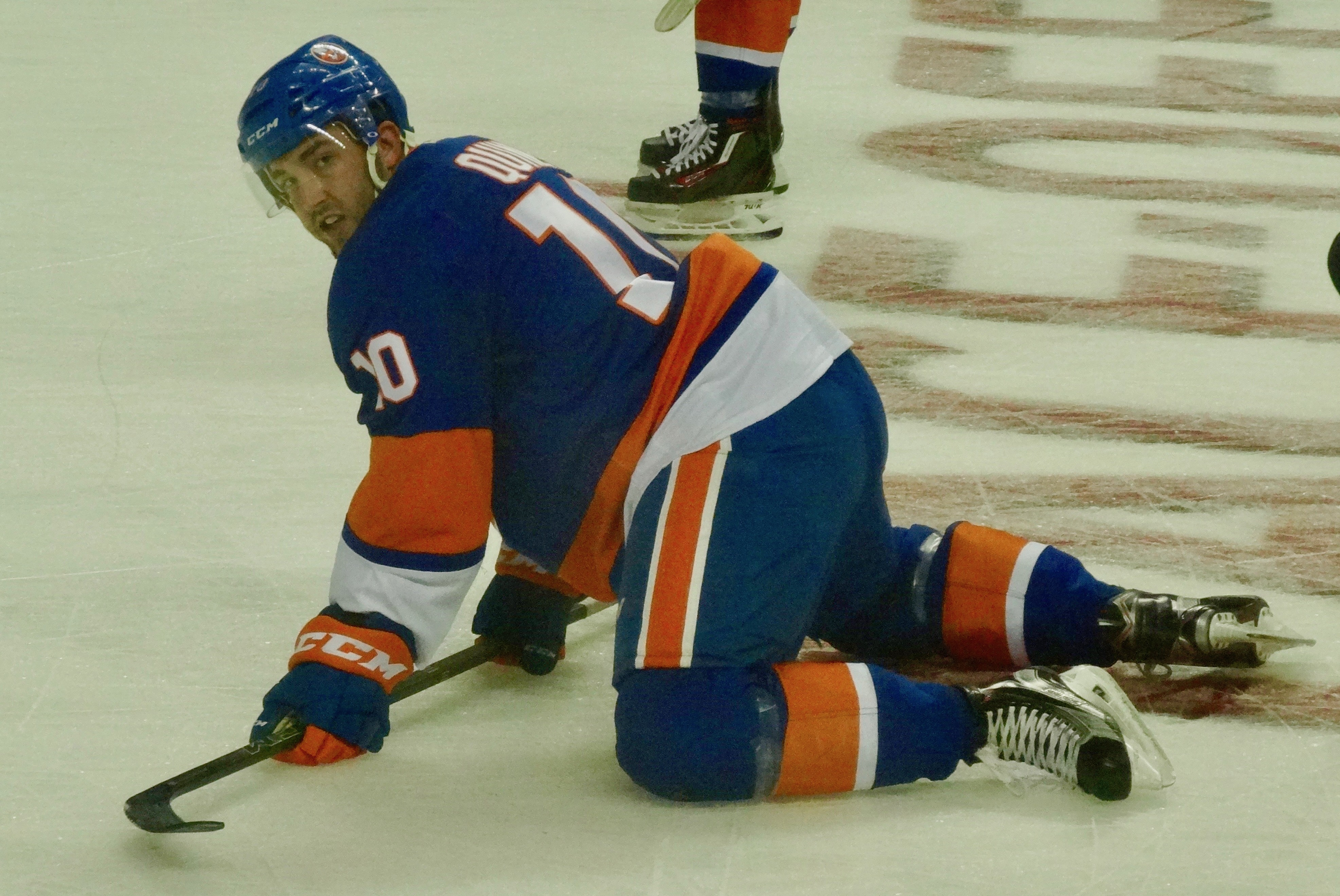
- Quine with the New York Islanders in 2016
- Born: February 25, 1993 (age 33) Belleville, Ontario, Canada
- Height: 6 ft 0 in (183 cm)
- Weight: 205 lb (93 kg; 14 st 9 lb)
- Position: Forward
- Shot: Left
- Played for: New York Islanders; Calgary Flames; Malmö Redhawks
- NHL draft: 85th overall, 2011; Detroit Red Wings; 166th overall, 2013; New York Islanders
- Playing career: 2012–2025

Alan Wesley Quine (born February 25, 1993) is a Canadian former professional ice hockey player. Quine was selected by the New York Islanders in the 6th round (166th overall) of the 2013 NHL entry draft.

== Playing career ==
=== Junior ===
Drafted by the Kingston Frontenacs in the first round (2nd overall) of the 2009 Ontario Hockey League (OHL) Priority Selection, Quine played 252 games in the OHL with the Kingston Frontenacs, Peterborough Petes, and Belleville Bulls, registering a total of 90 goals and 128 assists for 218 points, and 218 penalty minutes. Following the 2010–11 OHL season, Quine was selected by the Detroit Red Wings in the 3rd round of the 2011 NHL entry draft however, he did not sign with the Red Wings and continued to play major junior hockey in the OHL. Following the 2012–13 OHL season, Quine again heard his name called in the NHL entry draft, this time by the New York Islanders who picked him in the 6th round.

=== Professional ===
On September 28, 2013, the New York Islanders signed Quine to a three-year, entry-level contract, and he was assigned to play the 2013–14 season with the Bridgeport Sound Tigers of the AHL.

On April 9, 2016, Quine was called up from the Sound Tigers and made his NHL debut for the Islanders in a game against the Buffalo Sabres where he scored his first NHL point with a goal. On April 14, 2016, Quine scored his first NHL playoff point by having an assist. On April 22, 2016, Quine scored his first playoff and overtime goal.

Having not received a qualifying offer from the Islanders, Quine left as a free agent following the 2017–18 season. On July 1, 2018, he agreed to a one-year, two-way contract with the Calgary Flames.

After two seasons within the Flames organization, Quine left as a free agent to sign a one-year, $750,000 contract with rival club, the Edmonton Oilers on October 9, 2020.

Leaving the Oilers as a free agent following the 2020–21 season having played exclusively with minor-league affiliate, the Bakersfield Condors, Quine opted to extend his career in the AHL by agreeing to a one-year deal with the Henderson Silver Knights on September 1, 2021.

As an un-signed free agent heading into the 2022–23 season, Quine was signed to continue his career in the AHL, agreeing to a contract with the Ontario Reign, primary affiliate to the Los Angeles Kings, on August 18, 2022.

At the conclusion of his contract with the Reign, Quine left North America as a free agent and signed a one-year deal with Swedish club, Malmö Redhawks of the SHL, on July 12, 2023.

== International play ==
At the 2010 World U-17 Hockey Challenge, Quine settled for a silver medal with Team Ontario, despite being named the player-of-the-game in the final championship match. Quine won gold with Team Canada at the 2010 Ivan Hlinka Memorial Tournament, and he also competed at the 2011 IIHF World U18 Championships where he scored seven points in seven games, however Team Canada finished the tournament ranked fourth.

== Career statistics ==
=== Regular season and playoffs ===
			Regular season					Playoffs
Season	Team	League	GP	G	A	Pts	PIM	GP	G	A	Pts	PIM
2008–09	Toronto Jr. Canadiens	OJHL	2	1	1	2	0	—	—	—	—	—
2009–10	Kingston Frontenacs	OHL	64	11	17	28	8	7	1	2	3	0
2010–11	Kingston Frontenacs	OHL	17	4	7	11	2	—	—	—	—	—
2010–11	Peterborough Petes	OHL	52	22	20	42	6	—	—	—	—	—
2011–12	Peterborough Petes	OHL	65	30	40	70	21	—	—	—	—	—
2011–12	Grand Rapids Griffins	AHL	3	0	1	1	0	—	—	—	—	—
2012–13	Peterborough Petes	OHL	26	9	17	26	14	—	—	—	—	—
2012–13	Belleville Bulls	OHL	28	14	27	41	6	17	8	7	15	6
2013–14	Bridgeport Sound Tigers	AHL	61	8	19	27	23	—	—	—	—	—
2013–14	Stockton Thunder	ECHL	7	2	6	8	2	8	3	1	4	0
2014–15	Bridgeport Sound Tigers	AHL	75	23	38	61	34	—	—	—	—	—
2015–16	Bridgeport Sound Tigers	AHL	56	19	29	48	24	—	—	—	—	—
2015–16	New York Islanders	NHL	2	1	0	1	0	10	1	4	5	2
2016–17	New York Islanders	NHL	61	5	13	18	8	—	—	—	—	—
2017–18	New York Islanders	NHL	21	0	3	3	4	—	—	—	—	—
2017–18	Bridgeport Sound Tigers	AHL	4	1	0	1	4	—	—	—	—	—
2018–19	Stockton Heat	AHL	41	19	33	52	18	—	—	—	—	—
2018–19	Calgary Flames	NHL	13	3	2	5	6	—	—	—	—	—
2019–20	Stockton Heat	AHL	38	14	32	46	14	—	—	—	—	—
2019–20	Calgary Flames	NHL	9	1	0	1	4	3	0	1	1	0
2020–21	Bakersfield Condors	AHL	7	0	3	3	2	—	—	—	—	—
2021–22	Henderson Silver Knights	AHL	39	6	22	28	8	2	0	1	1	0
2022–23	Ontario Reign	AHL	64	8	19	27	23	2	0	0	0	0
2023–24	Malmö Redhawks	SHL	28	4	10	14	10	—	—	—	—	—
NHL totals			106	10	18	28	22	13	1	5	6	2
SHL totals			28	4	10	14	10	—	—	—	—	—

=== International ===
Year	Team	Event	Result	GP	G	A	Pts	PIM
2010	Canada Ontario	U17	2nd place, silver medalist(s)	6	1	2	3	0
2010	Canada	IH18	1st place, gold medalist(s)	5	1	2	3	0
2011	Canada	U18	4th	7	1	6	7	6
Junior totals				18	3	10	13	6

== Awards and honors ==
Award	Year
International
World U-17 Hockey Challenge Silver Medal	2010
Ivan Hlinka Memorial Tournament Gold Medal	2010
IIHF World U18 Championship (Team Canada)	2011
