= Spencer Martin (ice hockey) =

Canadian ice hockey player (born 1995)

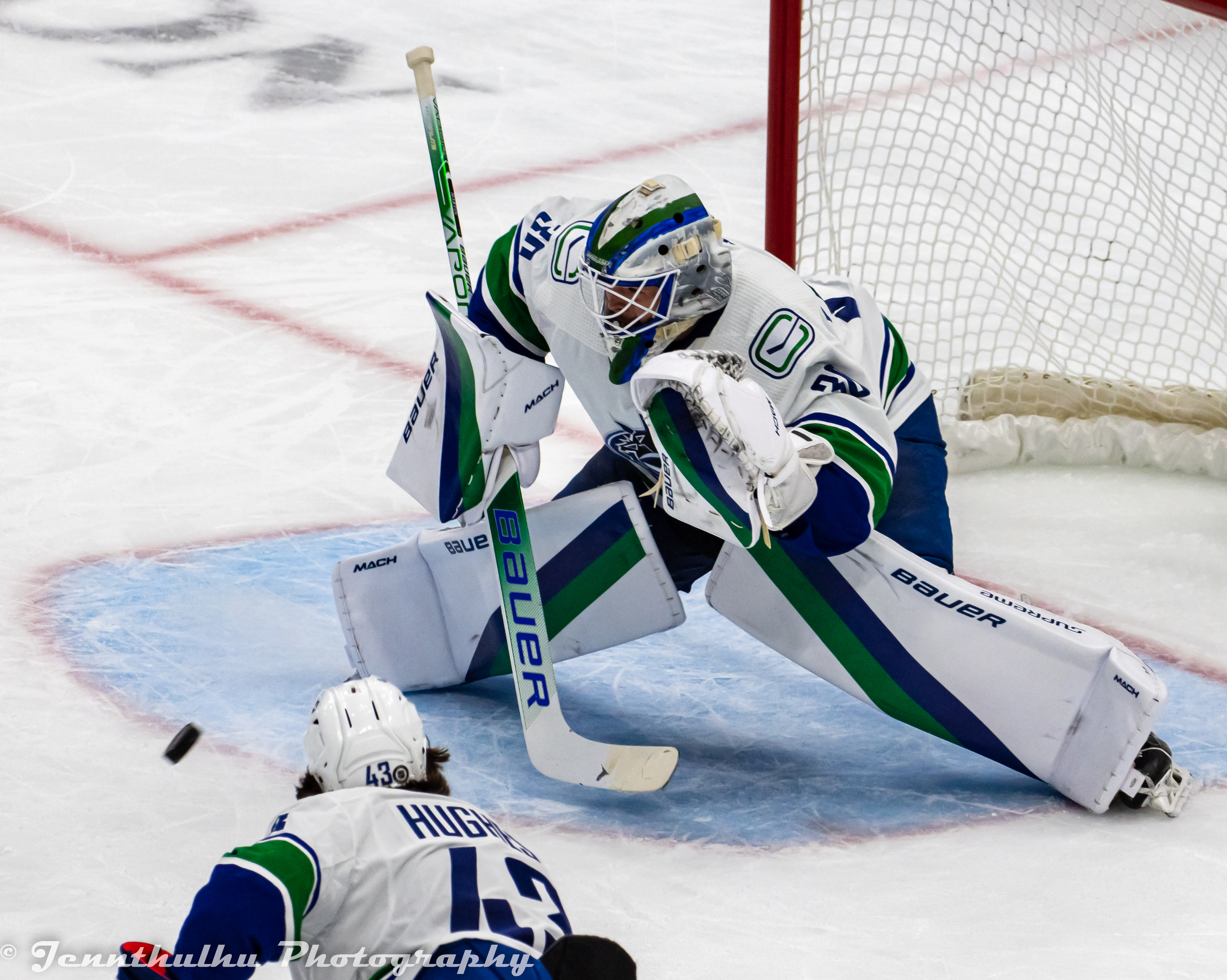
- Martin with the Vancouver Canucks in 2023
- Born: June 8, 1995 (age 31) Oakville, Ontario, Canada
- Height: 6 ft 3 in (191 cm)
- Weight: 201 lb (91 kg; 14 st 5 lb)
- Position: Goaltender
- Catches: Left
- NHL team (P) Cur. team Former teams: Chicago Blackhawks; Rockford IceHogs (AHL); Colorado Avalanche; Vancouver Canucks; Columbus Blue Jackets; Carolina Hurricanes; CSKA Moscow; New York Rangers
- NHL draft: 63rd overall, 2013; Colorado Avalanche
- Playing career: 2015–present

Spencer Martin (born June 8, 1995) is a Canadian professional ice hockey player who is a goaltender for the Rockford IceHogs of the American Hockey League (AHL) while under contract to the Chicago Blackhawks of the National Hockey League (NHL). Martin was selected by the Colorado Avalanche in the third round, 63rd overall, in the 2013 NHL entry draft, and has also played in the NHL for the Vancouver Canucks, Columbus Blue Jackets, Carolina Hurricanes and New York Rangers, as well as a brief stint with CSKA Moscow of the Kontinental Hockey League (KHL).

== Playing career ==
An Ontario native, Martin played midget hockey with the Toronto Jr. Canadiens before he was originally selected 18th overall in the 2011 OHL Priority Selection by the Mississauga St. Michael's Majors, He made his debut in the 2011–12 season, appearing in 15 games in the last season that the team was known as the Majors.

With the renamed Mississauga Steelheads during the 2012–13 season, Martin was an invited participant at the 2013 CHL Top Prospects Game where he led Team Orr to a rare shutout win. Leading up to the 2013 NHL entry draft, Martin was rated as a top prospect. He was the fifth goaltender selected in the draft, when he was selected 63rd overall by the Colorado Avalanche.

In the 2013–14 season, Martin, playing in his second campaign as the Steelheads' first-choice goaltender, appeared in a league-high 64 games and 3562 minutes in posting 24 wins. In his final year of major junior hockey, Martin was signed by the Avalanche to a three-year, entry-level contract on October 5, 2014.

While playing in a career-high 50 games during the 2016–17 season, Martin was selected for the 2017 AHL All-Star Classic, the first and only Rampage goaltender to ever be selected. The same season, Martin made his NHL debut on January 21, 2017, in a 3–2 overtime loss to the San Jose Sharks. Due to the recalls by the Avalanche, Martin was unable to participate in the All-Star Classic. On July 16, 2018, Martin signed a one-year contract extension with the Avalanche.

An impending restricted free agent following the conclusion of his entry-level contract, Martin's tenure with the Avalanche ended after he was not tendered a qualifying offer on June 25, 2019. On the opening day of free agency, Martin agreed to a one-year, two-way contract with the Tampa Bay Lightning on July 1, 2019.

Martin was one of eight players called up to the Lightning for their training camp prior to the 2020 Stanley Cup playoffs.

On May 3, 2021, Martin signed a one-year, two-way contract extension with the Lightning.

In the following off-season, on July 31, 2021, Martin was traded by the Lightning to the Vancouver Canucks in exchange for future considerations. Martin played sevn games for the Abbotsford Canucks of the American Hockey League (AHL) to begin the 2021–22 campaign, posting a 5–0–2 record with a 2.24 GAA, .921 save percentage and 1 shutout, a 23-save performance against the San Diego Gulls, before being called up to the parent club on January 15 after its backup netminder, Jaroslav Halák, was placed on COVID-19 protocol. Starter Thatcher Demko subsequently tested positive for COVID-19 on January 20. This led to Martin playing in his first NHL game in nearly five years on January 21. Facing the league leading Florida Panthers, Martin turned aside 33 shots in a 2–1 shootout loss and was named the game's first star. He followed this up with a 47-save effort in a 3–2 overtime loss to the Edmonton Oilers on January 25. Martin earned his first NHL win in his following start, stopping 33 shots in a 5–1 victory over the Winnipeg Jets on January 27. He was reassigned to Abbotsford on January 30 as Demko and Halák returned to play.

On September 29, 2023, the Columbus Blue Jackets claimed Martin off waivers from the Vancouver Canucks. Remaining with Columbus to begin the 2023–24 season, Martin made his debut with the Blue Jackets replacing starting goaltender Elvis Merzļikins during a 5–3 victory over the New York Rangers on October 14, 2023. Martin was used in rotation by the Blue Jackets, posting just three wins through 13 games, before he was surpassed for the backup role by Daniil Tarasov. Martin was placed on waivers by the Blue Jackets, and was subsequently claimed by the Carolina Hurricanes on January 19, 2024.

During the 2024–25 season, on October 28, 2024, Martin was recalled from the Wolves to replace an injured Frederik Andersen. On November 16, Martin recorded his first career shutout as the Hurricanes defeated the Ottawa Senators 4-0. He made 9 appearances with the Hurricanes, however was unable to find consistency between the pipes and was re-assigned to the Wolves for the remainder of the season. As the starting goaltender with the Wolves, Martin helped the club return to the post-season, posting 20 wins in just 31 appearances.

As a free agent at the conclusion of his contract with the Hurricanes, Martin opted to pursue a career abroad by agreeing to a two-year contract with Russian club, CSKA Moscow of the Kontinental Hockey League (KHL), on July 2, 2025. However, just four months into his tenure with CSKA, Martin was waived by the team on November 5. Just over a week later, on November 12, Martin signed a two-year contract with the New York Rangers, who assigned him to their AHL affiliate the Hartford Wolf Pack.

On November 15, 2026, Martin was traded to the Chicago Blackhawks in exchange for Arvid Söderblom.

== International play ==
Martin won a bronze medal with Team Ontario at the 2012 World U-17 Hockey Challenge, and was also a member of Canada under-18 team at the 2012 World U18 Championships, which won bronze medals. In 2013, he helped Canada's under-18 team win gold medals at the 2013 World U18 Championships.

== Personal life ==
Martin is a Catholic Christian. While he grew up Catholic, he began to attend Church services and Bible studies more frequently just prior to attending university, he later met his wife Danielle Jones during a Bible study. Martin proposed to Jones in 2024.

== Career statistics ==
=== Regular season and playoffs ===
			Regular season									Playoffs
Season	Team	League	GP	W	L	OTL	MIN	GA	SO	GAA	SV%	GP	W	L	MIN	GA	SO	GAA	SV%
2010–11	Toronto Jr. Canadiens	GTMMHL	50	—	—	—	2,250	115	5	2.27	—	—	—	—	—	—	—	—	—
2011–12	Mississauga St. Michael's Majors	OHL	15	2	7	1	753	50	0	3.98	.885	—	—	—	—	—	—	—	—
2012–13	Mississauga Steelheads	OHL	46	17	21	4	2,504	126	0	3.02	.906	2	0	1	90	9	0	6.01	.804
2013–14	Mississauga Steelheads	OHL	64	24	33	5	3,562	210	3	3.54	.899	4	0	4	270	18	0	3.99	.901
2014–15	Mississauga Steelheads	OHL	31	15	13	1	1,713	85	1	2.98	.921	—	—	—	—	—	—	—	—
2015–16	Fort Wayne Komets	ECHL	20	9	9	1	1,113	60	2	3.23	.878	1	0	1	44	5	0	6.87	.688
2015–16	San Antonio Rampage	AHL	18	7	7	1	905	40	3	2.65	.921	—	—	—	—	—	—	—	—
2016–17	San Antonio Rampage	AHL	50	19	26	5	2,812	136	2	2.90	.904	—	—	—	—	—	—	—	—
2016–17	Colorado Avalanche	NHL	3	0	2	1	181	13	0	4.35	.865	—	—	—	—	—	—	—	—
2017–18	San Antonio Rampage	AHL	34	14	15	4	1,856	96	1	3.10	.893	—	—	—	—	—	—	—	—
2018–19	Colorado Eagles	AHL	23	9	10	2	1,305	74	3	3.40	.902	—	—	—	—	—	—	—	—
2019–20	Orlando Solar Bears	ECHL	4	2	2	0	231	12	0	3.12	.915	—	—	—	—	—	—	—	—
2019–20	Syracuse Crunch	AHL	33	12	11	5	1,742	87	0	3.00	.897	—	—	—	—	—	—	—	—
2020–21	Syracuse Crunch	AHL	15	7	5	2	847	40	0	2.83	.907	—	—	—	—	—	—	—	—
2021–22	Abbotsford Canucks	AHL	25	19	4	2	1,506	61	3	2.43	.914	2	0	2	125	5	0	2.40	.938
2021–22	Vancouver Canucks	NHL	6	3	0	3	378	11	0	1.74	.950	—	—	—	—	—	—	—	—
2022–23	Vancouver Canucks	NHL	29	11	15	1	1,611	107	0	3.99	.871	—	—	—	—	—	—	—	—
2022–23	Abbotsford Canucks	AHL	16	7	7	2	962	39	1	2.43	.916	4	2	2	250	8	1	1.92	.929
2023–24	Columbus Blue Jackets	NHL	13	3	8	1	707	43	0	3.65	.887	—	—	—	—	—	—	—	—
2023–24	Carolina Hurricanes	NHL	6	4	1	1	365	16	0	2.63	.896	—	—	—	—	—	—	—	—
2024–25	Carolina Hurricanes	NHL	9	3	4	1	416	27	1	3.89	.846	—	—	—	—	—	—	—	—
2024–25	Chicago Wolves	AHL	31	20	8	2	1,818	71	3	2.34	.909	2	0	2	130	6	0	2.78	.900
2025–26	CSKA Moscow	KHL	14	5	6	2	780	35	2	2.69	.905	—	—	—	—	—	—	—	—
2025–26	Hartford Wolf Pack	AHL	22	3	13	3	1,197	70	2	3.51	.873	—	—	—	—	—	—	—	—
2025–26	New York Rangers	NHL	6	1	3	0	291	20	0	4.13	.864	—	—	—	—	—	—	—	—
2025–26	New York Rangers	NHL	1	0	0	0	35	3	0	5.09	.833	—	—	—	—	—	—	—	—
2025–26	Hartford Wolf Pack	AHL	4	2	1	1	240	12	0	3.00	.890	—	—	—	—	—	—	—	—
NHL totals			73	25	33	8	3,982	240	1	3.62	.881	—	—	—	—	—	—	—	—
KHL totals			14	5	6	2	780	35	2	2.69	.905	—	—	—	—	—	—	—	—

=== International ===
Year	Team	Event	Result	GP	W	L	T	MIN	GA	SO	GAA	SV%
2012	Canada Ontario	U17	3rd place, bronze medalist(s)	5	4	1	0	308	10	1	1.95	.931
2013	Canada	U18	1st place, gold medalist(s)	2	2	0	0	120	2	0	1.00	.941
Junior totals				7	6	1	0	428	12	1	1.68	.934

== Awards and honours ==
Award	Year	Ref
OHL
Second All-Rookie Team	2012	
CHL Top Prospects Game	2013	
International
World U-17 Hockey Challenge bronze medal	2012	
U18 bronze medal	2012	
U18 gold medal	2013	
