= Mike Davies (ice hockey) =

Canadian ice hockey player

Micheal ‘Mike’ Davies (born February 5, 1997), is a former Canadian ice hockey left winger known for his tenure in the Ontario Hockey League (OHL) and subsequent play in Canadian university hockey.

Standing at 6 feet 3 inches and weighing 200 pounds, Davies shoots left-handed.

== OHL career ==
Davies began his OHL career with the Kitchener Rangers, selected 13th overall in the OHL priority draft. Davies began his OHL play during the 2013–2014 season. Over three seasons with the Rangers, he played a total of 136 games, recording 18 goals and 17 assists. In the 2015–2016 season, Davies was traded to the Saginaw Spirit. During his time with Saginaw, he appeared in 81 games, posting 15 goals and 13 assists.

== Post OHL Career ==
Following his OHL tenure, Davies joined the St. Catharines Falcons of the Greater Ontario Junior Hockey League (GOJHL) for the 2017–2018 season, and became team captain. In 44 games, he tallied 30 goals and 41 assists, leading the team in scoring.

Transitioning to university hockey, Davies enrolled at Wilfrid Laurier University and played for the Golden Hawks men's ice hockey team during the 2018–2019 season.

== Playing style ==
Throughout his career, Davies has been recognized for his offensive capabilities, particularly his goal-scoring proficiency and playmaking skills.

In September 2017, Davies was selected as Golden Horseshoe Player of the Month.

== Personal life ==
Davies lives in St. Catharines, Ontario, Canada. His sister, Emma Davies, plays soccer for the University of South Florida.
