= Connor Bunnaman =

Canadian ice hockey player (born 1998)

- Bunnaman in 2026
- Born: April 16, 1998 (age 28) Guelph, Ontario, Canada
- Height: 6 ft 1 in (185 cm)
- Weight: 207 lb (94 kg; 14 st 11 lb)
- Position: Centre
- Shoots: Left
- ELH team Former teams: Mountfield HK; Philadelphia Flyers; Kärpät
- NHL draft: 109th overall, 2016; Philadelphia Flyers
- Playing career: 2018–present

Connor Bunnaman (born April 16, 1998) is a Canadian professional ice hockey forward for Mountfield HK of the Czech Extraliga (ELH). Bunnaman played in the Ontario Hockey League for the Kitchener Rangers before being drafted by the Philadelphia Flyers in the 2016 NHL entry draft.

== Early life ==
Bunnaman was born on April 16, 1998, in Guelph, Ontario, Canada.

== Playing career ==
=== Junior ===
Growing up, Bunnaman played for the Guelph Jr. Gryphons U16 AAA in the South Central Triple-A Hockey League U16. Following this, he was named to Team OMHA White, where he competed at the OHL Gold Cup U-16 tournament and earned an invitation to Canada’s national under-17 development camp. He was subsequently drafted 31st overall in the 2014 Ontario Hockey League (OHL) draft by the Kitchener Rangers. He scored his first career OHL goal during a 6–5 win over the Guelph Storm off an assist from Mike Davies on October 13, 2014. As the Rangers began their playoff berth against the London Knights, he recorded his first post-season goal during Game 2.

Bunnaman was drafted in the fourth round, 109th overall, by the Philadelphia Flyers in the 2016 NHL entry draft. Upon being drafted, Bunnaman stated that he felt he would fit in well with the team because he considered himself "a two-way, power forward. I create space well for others so I think I fit into their system well." Prior to the 2017–18 season, Bunnaman signed an entry-level contract with the team and was invited to participate in the Flyers' training camp. Upon returning, Bunnaman was named captain of the Kitchener Rangers alongside alternate captains Adam Mascherin, Connor Hall and Jake Henderson. At the night of the announcement, Bunnaman also played in his 200th career OHL game, tying Barry Duench for 41st place in franchise history for regular-season games played.

=== Professional ===
==== Philadelphia Flyers ====
Upon concluding his major junior ice hockey career, Bunnaman joined the Flyers' American Hockey League (AHL) affiliate, the Lehigh Valley Phantoms, for the 2018–19 season. He recorded his first professional goal on October 28, 2018, in a 3–1 loss against the Hershey Bears. After a slow start to the season, Bunnaman was moved to the teams' first line after Phil Varone was recalled by the Flyers and played alongside Greg Carey and Nicolas Aubé-Kubel. By December, he had a goal-scoring streak of three games and recorded the game winning goal during a game against the Belleville Senators. Bunnaman ended the season with 32 points in 62 games.

After participating in the Flyers' 2019 training camp, Bunnaman made his NHL debut on October 4, 2019, skating 11:06 minutes and recording two shots on goal. He split the 2019-20 season between the Flyers and the Phantoms, but recorded his first career NHL goal on January 13, 2020, against the Boston Bruins. He also joined the Flyers for the 2020 playoffs in Toronto.

==== Florida Panthers ====
On March 19, 2022, Bunnaman was involved in a trade that sent him along with Claude Giroux, German Rubtsov, and a draft pick to the Florida Panthers in exchange for Owen Tippett and some draft picks.

==== Abroad ====
On July 31, 2023, as a free agent, Bunnaman was signed to his first contract abroad in agreeing to a one-year contract with Finnish Liiga team Kärpät.

At the conclusion of his contract with Kärpät, Bunnaman remained un-signed as a free agent over the summer before opting to continue his career abroad in signing an initial one-year contract with Czech league club, Mountfield HK of the ELH on October 12, 2024. During the 2024–25 season, Bunnaman having established himself within Mountfield's forward group, was signed to a two-year contract extension on January 17, 2025.

== Career statistics ==
			Regular season					Playoffs
Season	Team	League	GP	G	A	Pts	PIM	GP	G	A	Pts	PIM
2014–15	Kitchener Rangers	OHL	67	10	5	15	18	6	1	1	2	0
2015–16	Kitchener Rangers	OHL	68	16	22	38	14	9	2	2	4	0
2016–17	Kitchener Rangers	OHL	64	37	15	52	30	3	4	0	4	7
2017–18	Kitchener Rangers	OHL	66	27	23	50	31	19	5	9	14	16
2018–19	Lehigh Valley Phantoms	AHL	62	19	13	32	16	—	—	—	—	—
2019–20	Philadelphia Flyers	NHL	21	1	1	2	2	4	0	0	0	2
2019–20	Lehigh Valley Phantoms	AHL	29	6	3	9	12	—	—	—	—	—
2020–21	Philadelphia Flyers	NHL	18	0	1	1	2	—	—	—	—	—
2020–21	Lehigh Valley Phantoms	AHL	15	1	1	2	12	—	—	—	—	—
2021–22	Philadelphia Flyers	NHL	15	0	0	0	4	—	—	—	—	—
2021–22	Lehigh Valley Phantoms	AHL	41	6	5	11	10	—	—	—	—	—
2021–22	Charlotte Checkers	AHL	12	1	2	3	0	7	1	0	1	2
2022–23	Charlotte Checkers	AHL	61	16	7	23	48	7	2	3	5	0
2023–24	Oulun Kärpät	Liiga	56	7	11	18	14	7	0	1	1	0
NHL totals			54	1	2	3	8	4	0	0	0	2
