= Kyle Wood (ice hockey) =

Canadian ice hockey player (born 1996)

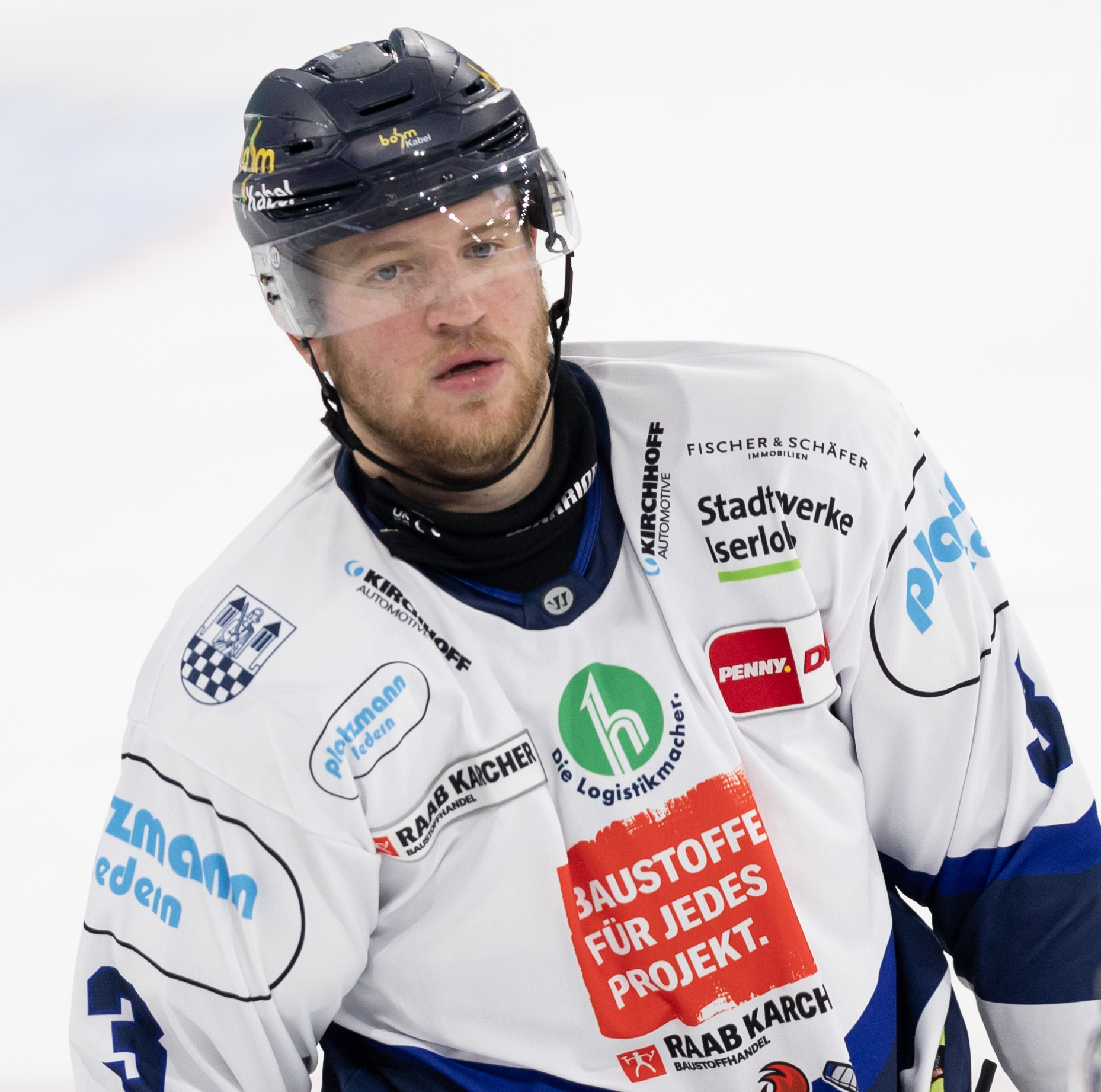
- Wood with the Iserlohn Roosters in 2025
- Born: May 4, 1996 (age 30) Waterloo, Ontario, Canada
- Height: 6 ft 5 in (196 cm)
- Weight: 235 lb (107 kg; 16 st 11 lb)
- Position: Defence
- Shoots: Right
- DEL team Former teams: Iserlohn Roosters; Springfield Falcons; Tucson Roadrunners; San Jose Barracuda; Charlotte Checkers; Grand Rapids Griffins; Rytíři Kladno; Kunlun Red Star
- NHL draft: 84th overall, 2014; Colorado Avalanche
- Playing career: 2016–present

Kyle Wood (born May 4, 1996) is a Canadian professional ice hockey defenceman for the Iserlohn Roosters of the Deutsche Eishockey Liga (DEL). Wood was drafted 84th overall by the Colorado Avalanche in the 2014 NHL entry draft.

== Playing career ==
Wood played youth hockey in his hometown of Waterloo, Ontario, and was selected in the third round, 57th overall, by the Brampton Battalion of the OHL Priority Selection in 2012.

Wood was selected after the 2013–14 season by the Colorado Avalanche in the 2014 NHL entry draft, 84th overall. In his final year of junior eligibility, the Avalanche traded Wood's NHL rights, along with those of Alex Tanguay and Conner Bleackley, to the Arizona Coyotes in exchange for Mikkel Boedker on February 29, 2016.

At the conclusion of the 2015–16 OHL season with the North Bay Battalion, Wood signed a three-year, entry-level contract with the Coyotes on March 27, 2016. This was later revised to an amateur try-out deal, which he made with their AHL affiliate, the Springfield Falcons.

After attending his first training camp with the Coyotes, Wood was reassigned to new AHL affiliate, the Tucson Roadrunners, for the 2016–17 season. In his first pro season, he earned October Rookie of the Month honors by registering points in all games. He also represented the Roadrunners at the AHL All-Star Classic. Wood finished the season with 13 goals and 40 points in 63 games, earning selection to the AHL All-Rookie Team.

On June 15, 2018, the Coyotes traded Wood to the San Jose Sharks for Adam Helewka. The Sharks re-signed him to a one-year contract on July 12, 2019.

On August 6, 2019, Wood was traded to the Carolina Hurricanes for Trevor Carrick. After the 2019 training camp, the Canes sent him to the Charlotte Checkers of the AHL for the 2019–20 season where he contributed 3 goals and 5 points in 14 games before being traded, for the fourth time in his professional career, going to the Detroit Red Wings in exchange for Oliwer Kaski on December 12, 2019.

Unable to impress within the Red Wings organization, Wood as an impending restricted free agent was not tendered a qualifying offer by the club and was released to free agency on October 8, 2020. Having played through 5 NHL organizations and unable to feature at top level, Wood left North America to sign his first European contract, agreeing to a one-year contract with second tier German club, Löwen Frankfurt of the DEL2, on November 2, 2020. Regaining his scoring touch from the blueline, Wood contributed with 5 goals and 21 points through 32 regular season games for Frankfurt.

As a free agent, Wood left Germany and opted to continue his European career in the Czech Republic, signing a one-year contract with Rytíři Kladno of the ELH, on July 14, 2021.

After three seasons with Kunlun, Wood returned to Germany as a free agent in signing a one-year contract with DEL club, Iserlohn Roosters, on August 22, 2025.

== Career statistics ==
			Regular season					Playoffs
Season	Team	League	GP	G	A	Pts	PIM	GP	G	A	Pts	PIM
2010–11	Waterloo Wolves	Midget AAA	2	0	0	0	0	—	—	—	—	—
2011–12	Waterloo Wolves	Midget AAA	30	9	11	20	54	14	3	13	16	6
2011–12	Waterloo Siskins	GOJHL	2	0	0	0	0	5	0	2	2	4
2012–13	Orangeville Flyers	OJHL	46	6	11	17	10	—	—	—	—	—
2012–13	Brampton Battalion	OHL	16	1	1	2	8	5	0	0	0	2
2013–14	North Bay Battalion	OHL	33	2	10	12	21	22	2	8	10	6
2014–15	North Bay Battalion	OHL	67	16	24	40	18	15	1	10	11	2
2015–16	North Bay Battalion	OHL	49	8	31	39	18	11	2	11	13	2
2015–16	Springfield Falcons	AHL	2	0	0	0	2	—	—	—	—	—
2016–17	Tucson Roadrunners	AHL	68	14	29	43	16	—	—	—	—	—
2017–18	Tucson Roadrunners	AHL	49	3	16	19	16	2	0	0	0	0
2018–19	San Jose Barracuda	AHL	68	6	29	35	47	4	0	1	1	14
2019–20	Charlotte Checkers	AHL	14	3	2	5	24	—	—	—	—	—
2019–20	Grand Rapids Griffins	AHL	35	1	5	6	8	—	—	—	—	—
2020–21	Löwen Frankfurt	DEL2	32	5	16	21	14	1	0	0	0	0
2021–22	Rytíři Kladno	ELH	54	8	14	22	18	—	—	—	—	—
2022–23	Kunlun Red Star	KHL	62	4	15	19	36	—	—	—	—	—
2023–24	Kunlun Red Star	KHL	47	8	6	14	32	—	—	—	—	—
2024–25	Kunlun Red Star	KHL	20	0	3	3	0	—	—	—	—	—
2025–26	Iserlohn Roosters	DEL	45	5	17	22	10	—	—	—	—	—
AHL totals			236	27	81	108	113	6	0	1	1	14
KHL totals			129	12	24	36	68	—	—	—	—	—

== Awards and honours ==
Award	Year
AHL
All-Star Game	2017
All-Rookie Team	2017
