= 2015–16 OHL season =

- League: Ontario Hockey League
- Sport: Hockey
- Duration: Preseason; August 2015 – September 2015; Regular season September 2015 – March 2016; Playoffs; March 2016 – May 2016
- Teams: 20
- TV partner(s): Rogers TV, TVCogeco, Shaw TV

Draft
- Top draft pick: David Levin
- Picked by: Sudbury Wolves

Regular season
- Hamilton Spectator Trophy: Erie Otters (2)
- Season MVP: Mitch Marner (London Knights)
- Top scorer: Kevin Labanc (Barrie Colts)

Playoffs
- Playoffs MVP: Mitch Marner (Knights)
- Finals champions: London Knights (4)
- Runners-up: Niagara IceDogs

OHL seasons
- 2014–15 2016–17

2015–16 CHL season
- League: Canadian Hockey League
- Sport: Hockey
- Duration: OHL; September 2015 – March 2016; QMJHL; September 2015 – March 2016; WHL; September 2015 – March 2016
- Teams: 60
- TV partner(s): RDS; Rogers Sportsnet; Rogers TV; Shaw TV
- Season MVP: Mitch Marner (London Knights) (OHL)
- Top scorer: Conor Garland (Moncton Wildcats) (QMJHL)

Memorial Cup
- Finals champions: London Knights (OHL) (2nd title)
- Runners-up: Rouyn-Noranda Huskies (QMJHL)

The 2015–16 OHL season was the 36th season of the Ontario Hockey League, in which twenty teams played 68 games each according to the regular season schedule, from September 2015 to March 2016. The Plymouth Whalers relocated to Flint and became the Flint Firebirds, playing at the Dort Federal Credit Union Event Center. The Belleville Bulls relocated to Hamilton and became the Hamilton Bulldogs, playing at FirstOntario Centre. The London Knights won the J. Ross Robertson Cup for the fourth time in franchise history, as they defeated the Niagara IceDogs in four games in the final round of the playoffs. The Knights qualified for the 2016 Memorial Cup held at the ENMAX Centrium in Red Deer, Alberta. London defeated the Rouyn-Noranda Huskies 3-2 in overtime in the final game, winning the Memorial Cup for the second time in franchise history.

== Regular season ==
=== Final standings ===
Note: DIV = Division; GP = Games played; W = Wins; L = Losses; OTL = Overtime losses; SL = Shootout losses; GF = Goals for; GA = Goals against; PTS = Points; x = clinched playoff berth; y = clinched division title; z = clinched conference title

=== Eastern conference ===
Rank	Team	DIV	GP	W	L	OTL	SL	PTS	GF	GA
1	z-Kingston Frontenacs	East	68	46	17	3	2	97	252	189
2	y-Barrie Colts	Central	68	43	22	0	3	89	295	207
3	x-North Bay Battalion	Central	68	35	23	6	4	80	240	227
4	x-Niagara IceDogs	Central	68	35	26	4	3	77	213	198
5	x-Ottawa 67's	East	68	36	29	2	1	75	234	219
6	x-Peterborough Petes	East	68	33	28	2	5	73	240	259
7	x-Mississauga Steelheads	Central	68	33	30	2	3	71	215	229
8	x-Oshawa Generals	East	68	27	33	4	4	62	197	235
9	Hamilton Bulldogs	East	68	25	35	8	0	58	197	260
10	Sudbury Wolves	Central	68	16	46	5	1	38	183	328

=== Western conference ===
Rank	Team	DIV	GP	W	L	OTL	SL	PTS	GF	GA
1	z-Erie Otters	Midwest	68	52	15	1	0	105	269	183
2	y-Sarnia Sting	West	68	42	19	5	2	91	254	192
3	x-London Knights	Midwest	68	51	14	2	1	105	319	182
4	x-Kitchener Rangers	Midwest	68	44	17	5	2	95	256	197
5	x-Windsor Spitfires	West	68	40	21	6	1	87	253	200
6	x-Owen Sound Attack	Midwest	68	32	25	8	3	75	209	222
7	x-Sault Ste. Marie Greyhounds	West	68	33	27	7	1	74	243	233
8	x-Saginaw Spirit	West	68	24	37	4	3	55	209	282
9	Flint Firebirds	West	68	20	42	4	2	46	184	279
10	Guelph Storm	Midwest	68	13	49	4	2	32	156	297

=== Scoring leaders ===
Note: GP = Games played; G = Goals; A = Assists; Pts = Points; PIM = Penalty minutes

Player	Team	GP	G	A	Pts	PIM
Kevin Labanc	Barrie Colts	65	39	88	127	70
Christian Dvorak	London Knights	59	52	69	121	27
Mitch Marner	London Knights	57	39	77	116	68
Dylan Strome	Erie Otters	56	37	74	111	44
Matthew Tkachuk	London Knights	57	30	77	107	80
Andrew Mangiapane	Barrie Colts	59	51	55	106	50
Alex DeBrincat	Erie Otters	60	51	50	101	28
Travis Konecny	Ottawa/Sarnia	60	30	71	101	27
Michael Amadio	North Bay Battalion	68	50	48	98	40
Christian Fischer	Windsor Spitfires	66	40	50	90	34

=== Leading goaltenders ===
Note: GP = Games played; Mins = Minutes played; W = Wins; L = Losses: OTL = Overtime losses; SL = Shootout losses; GA = Goals Allowed; SO = Shutouts; GAA = Goals against average

Player	Team	GP	Mins	W	L	OTL	SL	GA	SO	Sv%	GAA
Tyler Parsons	London Knights	49	2835	37	9	2	1	110	4	0.921	2.33
Devin Williams	Erie Otters	55	3179	41	10	1	0	125	2	0.915	2.36
Michael DiPietro	Windsor Spitfires	29	1644	16	8	1	1	67	2	0.912	2.45
Justin Fazio	Sarnia Sting	41	2466	24	13	3	1	110	3	0.902	2.68
Luke Opilka	Kitchener Rangers	44	2552	27	11	3	2	115	3	0.906	2.70

== Playoffs ==
Conference quarterfinals	Conference semifinals
1	Kingston	4
8	Oshawa	1
1	Kingston	0
4	Niagara	4
2	Barrie	4
7	Mississauga	3
Eastern conference
3	North Bay	4
6	Peterborough	3
2	Barrie	4
3	North Bay	0
4	Niagara	4
5	Ottawa	1
Note: Pairings are re-seeded after the first round.
1	Erie	4
8	Saginaw	0
1	Erie	4
7	Sault Ste. Marie	1
2	Sarnia	3
7	Sault Ste. Marie	4
Western conference
3	London	4
6	Owen Sound	2
3	London	4
4	Kitchener	0
4	Kitchener	4
5	Windsor	1

Conference finals
2	Barrie	0
4	Niagara	4
1	Erie	0
3	London	4

Finals
E4	Niagara	0
W3	London	4

=== Conference quarterfinals ===
==== Eastern conference quarterfinals ====
===== (1) Kingston Frontenacs vs. (8) Oshawa Generals =====
March 25	Oshawa Generals	0 – 6	Kingston Frontenacs	Rogers K-Rock Centre	Recap
No scoring		First period	No scoring
No scoring		Second period	6:54 - pp - Warren Foegele (1); 12:34 - Roland McKeown (1); 14:44 - Spencer Watson (1)
No scoring		Third period	1:16 - pp - Lawson Crouse (1); 1:37 - Jared Steege (1); 7:06 - Roland McKeown (2)
Jeremy Brodeur (27 saves / 32 shots); Justin Nichols (8 saves / 9 shots)		Goalie stats	Jeremy Helvig (18 saves / 18 shots)

March 26	Oshawa Generals	3 – 7	Kingston Frontenacs	Rogers K-Rock Centre	Recap
No scoring		First period	3:36 - pp - Spencer Watson (2); 16:24 - Warren Foegele (2); 18:33 - Warren Foegele (3)
Domenic Commisso (1) - 0:40		Second period	15:13 - Warren Foegele (4)
Joe Manchurek (1) - 6:08; Domenic Commisso (2) - pp - 12:44		Third period	11:56 - Lawson Crouse (2); 19:07 - en - sh - Lawson Crouse (3); 19:53 - Warren Foegele (5)
Jeremy Brodeur (11 saves / 14 shots); Justin Nichols (17 saves / 20 shots)		Goalie stats	Jeremy Helvig (26 saves / 29 shots)

March 29	Kingston Frontenacs	5 – 4	Oshawa Generals	General Motors Centre	Recap
No scoring		First period	2:09 - Domenic Commisso (3)
Michael Dal Colle (1) - 5:58; Warren Foegele (6) - 15:18		Second period	15:45 - Mitchell Vande Sompel (1)
Jason Robertson (1) - 2:06; Roland McKeown (3) - 9:04; Michael Dal Colle (2) - 19:36		Third period	0:18 - Anthony Cirelli (1); 15:55 - Joe Manchurek (2)
Jeremy Helvig (11 saves / 14 shots); Lucas Peressini (14 saves / 15 shots)		Goalie stats	Jeremy Brodeur (35 saves / 40 shots)

March 31	Kingston Frontenacs	3 – 4	OT	Oshawa Generals	General Motors Centre	Recap
Michael Dal Colle (3) - 15:04; Juho Lammikko (1) - 18:13		First period		No scoring
Jared Steege (2) - 1:39		Second period		10:32 - pp - Lukas Lofquist (1); 17:11 - pp - Anthony Cirelli (2); 18:29 - pp - Jalen Smereck (1)
No scoring		Third period		No scoring
No scoring		First overtime period		3:02 - Eric Henderson (1)
Lucas Peressini (28 saves / 32 shots)		Goalie stats		Jeremy Brodeur (43 saves / 46 shots)

April 1	Oshawa Generals	0 – 6	Kingston Frontenacs	Rogers K-Rock Centre	Recap
No scoring		First period	13:11 - Ryan Verbeek (1)
No scoring		Second period	8:05 - pp - Stephen Desrocher (1); 8:48 - pp - Lawson Crouse (4); 16:49 - Spencer Watson (3); 16:56 - Warren Foegele (7)
No scoring		Third period	5:04 - Warren Foegele (8)
Jeremy Brodeur (18 saves / 22 shots); Justin Nichols (11 saves / 13 shots)		Goalie stats	Jeremy Helvig (20 saves / 20 shots)

Kingston wins series 4 – 1

===== (2) Barrie Colts vs. (7) Mississauga Steelheads =====
March 26	Mississauga Steelheads	2 – 5	Barrie Colts	Barrie Molson Centre	Recap
Josh Burnside (1) - 14:57		First period	18:59 - pp - Greg DiTomaso (1); 19:43 - pp - Dylan Sadowy (1)
Damian Bourne (1) - 18:43		Second period	13:45 - Kevin Labanc (1)
No scoring		Third period	19:27 - en - Dylan Sadowy (2); 19:49 - en - Julius Nättinen (1)
Jack Flinn (37 saves / 40 shots)		Goalie stats	Mackenzie Blackwood (23 saves / 25 shots)

March 28	Mississauga Steelheads	6 – 3	Barrie Colts	Barrie Molson Centre	Recap
No scoring		First period	4:21 - Justin Scott (1)
No scoring		Second period	8:03 - sh - Rasmus Andersson (1); 14:56 - pp - Anthony Stefano (1)
Everett Clark (1) - 7:16; Alexander Nylander (1) - 10:58; Alexander Nylander (2) - 13:08; Mason Marchment (1) - 16:14; Daniel Muzito-Bagenda (1) - 18:07; Alexander Nylander (3) - en - 19:15		Third period	No scoring
Jack Flinn (36 saves / 39 shots)		Goalie stats	Mackenzie Blackwood (30 saves / 35 shots)

March 29	Barrie Colts	3 – 4	2OT	Mississauga Steelheads	Hershey Centre	Recap
Justin Scott (2) - 12:39; Kevin Labanc (2) - pp - 17:48		First period		6:38 - pp - Daniel Muzito-Bagenda (2); 11:15 - Alexander Nylander (4)
Justin Scott (3) - 13:19		Second period		9:54 - pp - Daniel Muzito-Bagenda (3)
No scoring		Third period		No scoring
No scoring		Second overtime period		2:49 - Josh Burnside (2)
Mackenzie Blackwood (34 saves / 37 shots); David Ovsjannikov (0 saves / 1 shot)		Goalie stats		Jack Flinn (23 saves / 26 shots)

March 31	Barrie Colts	6 – 5	OT	Mississauga Steelheads	Hershey Centre	Recap
Andre Mangiapane (1) - sh - 7:08; Justin Scott (4) - 10:45		First period		5:21 - pp - Alexander Nylander (5)
Rasmus Andersson (2) - 18:54		Second period		4:15 - Daniel Muzito-Bagenda (4); 12:41 - Michael McLeod (1)
Justin Scott (5) - 7:40; Justin Scott (6) - 16:19		Third period		1:51 - pp - Daniel Muzito-Bagenda (5); 2:09 - pp - Alexander Nylander (6)
Justin Scott (7) - 4:46		First overtime period		No scoring
David Ovsjannikov (29 saves / 34 shots)		Goalie stats		Jack Flinn (38 saves / 44 shots)

April 2	Mississauga Steelheads	0 – 3	Barrie Colts	Barrie Molson Centre	Recap
No scoring		First period	17:09 - Andrew Mangiapane (2)
No scoring		Second period	11:12 - pp - Kevin Labanc (3)
No scoring		Third period	16:54 - en - Andrew Mangiapane (3)
Jack Flinn (29 saves / 31 shots)		Goalie stats	David Ovsjannikov (30 saves / 30 shots)

April 3	Barrie Colts	0 – 7	Mississauga Steelheads	Hershey Centre	Recap
No scoring		First period	3:03 - Brendan Harrogate (1); 5:07 - Sean Day (1); 6:11 - Michael McLeod (2)
No scoring		Second period	2:43 - Mason Marchment (2)
No scoring		Third period	11:27 - Jared Welsh (1); 16:59 - pp - Daniel Muzito-Bagenda (6); 19:51 - pp - Owen Tippett (1)
David Ovsjannikov (0 saves / 3 shots); Mackenzie Blackwood (28 saves / 32 shots)		Goalie stats	Jack Flinn (24 saves / 24 shots)

April 5	Mississauga Steelheads	1 – 5	Barrie Colts	Barrie Molson Centre	Recap
No scoring		First period	No scoring
Michael McLeod (3) - 12:13		Second period	No scoring
No scoring		Third period	4:20 - Justin Scott (8); 9:12 - pp - Andrew Mangiapane (4); 11:37 - Justin Scott (9); 16:29 - pp - Justin Scott (10); 18:45 - en - sh - Kevin Labanc (4)
Jack Flinn (28 saves / 32 shots)		Goalie stats	Mackenzie Blackwood (22 saves / 23 shots)

Barrie wins series 4 – 3

===== (3) North Bay Battalion vs. (6) Peterborough Petes =====
March 25	Peterborough Petes	1 – 2	North Bay Battalion	North Bay Memorial Gardens	Recap
Logan DeNoble (1) - pp - 11:39		First period	14:23 - sh - Michael Amadio (1)
No scoring		Second period	No scoring
No scoring		Third period	7:09 - Brett Hargrave (1)
Matthew Mancina (30 saves / 32 shots)		Goalie stats	Jake Smith (20 saves / 21 shots)

March 27	Peterborough Petes	5 – 3	North Bay Battalion	North Bay Memorial Gardens	Recap
Logan DeNoble (2) - 19:49		First period	16:22 - Maurizio Colella (1)
Hunter Garlent (1) - 4:57; Jonathan Ang (1) - pp - 9:36; Greg Betzold (1) - 17:14		Second period	19:13 - pp - Michael Amadio (2)
Steven Lorentz (1) - 6:09		Third period	16:19 - pp - Steve Harland (1)
Matthew Mancina (24 saves / 27 shots)		Goalie stats	Jake Smith (16 saves / 21 shots)

March 29	North Bay Battalion	6 – 7	OT	Peterborough Petes	Peterborough Memorial Centre	Recap
Michael Amadio (3) - 0:39; Brett McKenzie (1) - 3:51		First period		1:57 - Hunter Garlent (2); 16:56 - Adam Timleck (1)
Mathew Santos (1) - 4:39		Second period		5:28 - Daniel Nikandrov (1)
Mathew Santos (2) - 4:33; Steve Harland (2) - pp - 10:49; Mathew Santos (3) - pp - 18:08		Third period		6:04 - Logan DeNoble (3); 7:41 - pp - Hunter Garlent (3); 8:09 - Josh Maguire (1)
No scoring		First overtime period		4:46 - Jonathan Ang (2)
Jake Smith (35 saves / 42 shots)		Goalie stats		Matthew Mancina (33 saves / 39 shots)

March 31	North Bay Battalion	2 – 0	Peterborough Petes	Peterborough Memorial Centre	Recap
No scoring		First period	No scoring
Jacob Ball (1) - 11:38		Second period	No scoring
Riley Bruce (1) - pp - 11:57		Third period	No scoring
Jake Smith (29 saves / 29 shots)		Goalie stats	Matthew Mancina (32 saves / 34 shots)

April 1	Peterborough Petes	1 – 2	OT	North Bay Battalion	North Bay Memorial Gardens	Recap
No scoring		First period		5:07 - pp - Brett McKenzie (2)
Steven Lorentz (2) - 12:27		Second period		No scoring
No scoring		Third period		No scoring
No scoring		First overtime period		11:08 - Michael Amadio (4)
Matthew Mancina (39 saves / 41 shots)		Goalie stats		Jake Smith (34 saves / 35 shots)

April 3	North Bay Battalion	5 – 7	Peterborough Petes	Peterborough Memorial Centre	Recap
No scoring		First period	No scoring
Michael Amadio (5) - pp - 1:19; Michael Amadio (6) - 5:33; Michael Amadio (7) - 8:06		Second period	16:29 - Greg Betzold (2); 18:17 - Hunter Garlent (4)
Maurizio Colella (2) - 13:49; Maurizio Colella (3) - 19:23		Third period	8:10 - sh - Jonathan Ang (3); 11:29 - Brandon Prophet (1); 13:18 - Greg Betzold (3); 18:34 - en - Eric Cornel (1); 19:52 - en - Brandon Prophet (2)
Jake Smith (23 saves / 28 shots)		Goalie stats	Matthew Mancina (31 saves / 36 shots)

April 5	Peterborough Petes	1 – 4	North Bay Battalion	North Bay Memorial Gardens	Recap
Josh Maguire (2) - 3:57		First period	7:45 - Kyle Wood (1); 18:29 - pp - Mathew Santos (4)
No scoring		Second period	4:08 - Michael Amadio (8)
No scoring		Third period	18:35 - en - pp - Michael Amadio (9)
Matthew Mancina (23 saves / 26 shots)		Goalie stats	Jake Smith (27 saves / 28 shots)

North Bay wins series 4 – 3

===== (4) Niagara IceDogs vs. (5) Ottawa 67's =====
March 24	Ottawa 67's	4 – 5	Niagara IceDogs	Meridian Centre	Recap
Nathan Todd (1) - pp - 5:45		First period	1:25 - William Lochead (1)
Travis Barron (1) - 5:47; Dante Salituro (1) - pp - 13:08		Second period	3:37 - pp - Anthony DiFruscia (1); 6:55 - Graham Knott (1); 14:47 - Pavel Jenyš (1)
Jeremiah Addison (1) - pp - 16:46		Third period	1:05 - pp - Vince Dunn (1)
Leonid Lazarev (31 saves / 36 shots)		Goalie stats	Alex Nedeljkovic (19 saves / 23 shots)

March 26	Ottawa 67's	3 – 5	Niagara IceDogs	Meridian Centre	Recap
Dante Salituro (2) - 8:25; Travis Barron (2) - 11:27		First period	No scoring
No scoring		Second period	6:05 - Brendan Perlini (1)
Nevin Guy (1) - pp - 2:23		Third period	0:33 - pp - Pavel Jenyš (2); 3:23 - Christopher Paquette (1); 11:32 - Josh Ho-Sang (1); 19:03 - en - Brendan Perlini (2)
Leonid Lazarev (26 saves / 30 shots)		Goalie stats	Alex Nedeljkovic (24 saves / 27 shots)

March 28	Niagara IceDogs	2 – 4	Ottawa 67's	TD Place Arena	Recap
No scoring		First period	1:06 - Artur Tyanulin (1); 7:51 - Nathan Todd (2)
Pavel Jenyš (3) - pp - 15:07		Second period	1:40 - Nathan Todd (3); 15:36 - Stephen Falkovsky (1)
Vince Dunn (2) - pp - 2:46		Third period	No scoring
Alex Nedeljkovic (12 saves / 16 shots)		Goalie stats	Leonid Lazarev (26 saves / 28 shots)

March 30	Niagara IceDogs	2 – 1	OT	Ottawa 67's	TD Place Arena	Recap
Pavel Jenyš (4) - 19:04		First period		No scoring
No scoring		Second period		No scoring
No scoring		Third period		16:49 - pp - Nathan Todd (4)
Jordan Maletta (1) - 0:46		First overtime period		No scoring
Alex Nedeljkovic (30 saves / 31 shots)		Goalie stats		Leonid Lazarev (28 saves / 30 shots)

April 1	Ottawa 67's	2 – 5	Niagara IceDogs	Meridian Centre	Recap
No scoring		First period	8:58 - pp - Brendan Perlini (3)
Austen Keating (1) - 19:57		Second period	2:32 - Ryan Mantha (1)
Evan de Haan (1) - 15:23		Third period	6:35 - Kyle Langdon (1); 16:48 - Pavel Jenyš (5); 19:29 - en - Josh Ho-Sang (2)
Leonid Lazarev (29 saves / 33 shots)		Goalie stats	Alex Nedeljkovic (22 saves / 24 shots)

Niagara wins series 4 – 1

==== Western conference quarterfinals ====
===== (1) Erie Otters vs. (8) Saginaw Spirit =====
March 25	Saginaw Spirit	1 – 5	Erie Otters	Erie Insurance Arena	Recap
No scoring		First period	6:47 - Kyle Maksimovich (1); 12:12 - Nick Betz (1); 15:48 - Kyle Pettit (1)
No scoring		Second period	5:55 - pp - Travis Dermott (1); 9:19 - Kyle Pettit (2)
Jesse Barwell (1) - sh - 14:02		Third period	No scoring
Evan Cormier (21 saves / 26 shots); Cameron Zanussi (10 saves / 10 shots)		Goalie stats	Devin Williams (15 saves / 16 shots)

March 27	Saginaw Spirit	3 – 7	Erie Otters	Erie Insurance Arena	Recap
No scoring		First period	12:20 - pp - Taylor Raddysh (1); 13:52 - pp - Alex DeBrincat (1)
Jesse Barwell (2) - sh - 14:52		Second period	2:09 - pp - Dylan Strome (1); 9:24 - Mitchell Byrne (1); 16:02 - pp - Kyle Maksimovich (2)
Connor Brown (1) - 8:40; Brady Gilmour (1) - 14:54		Third period	10:35 - Patrick Fellows (1); 16:51 - en - Kyle Pettit (3)
Evan Cormier (36 saves / 42 shots)		Goalie stats	Devin Williams (19 saves / 22 shots)

March 29	Erie Otters	6 – 3	Saginaw Spirit	Dow Event Center	Recap
Christian Girhiny (1) - 2:53; Taylor Raddysh (2) - 4:36; Alex DeBrincat (2) - 13:57; Kyle Maksimovich (3) - 18:20		First period	6:29 - Mike Davies (1); 11:01 - Connor Brown (2)
Alex DeBrincat (3) - pp - 12:13; Dylan Strome (2) - sh - 14:37		Second period	No scoring
No scoring		Third period	9:26 - Mitchell Stephens (1)
Devin Williams (10 saves / 12 shots); Jake Lawr (11 saves / 12 shots)		Goalie stats	Evan Cormier (32 saves / 38 shots)

March 31	Erie Otters	6 – 4	Saginaw Spirit	Dow Event Center	Recap
Taylor Raddysh (3) - 3:42; Travis Dermott (2) - 6:52; Kyle Maksimovich (4) - 19:05		First period	No scoring
Patrick Fellows (2) - 0:37; Dylan Strome (3) - pp - 14:37		Second period	3:05 - Kirill Maksimov (1); 9:49 - pp - Connor Brown (3); 17:54 - Connor Brown (4)
Dylan Strome (4) - en - 19:58		Third period	16:03 - Mitchell Stephens (2)
Jake Lawr (22 saves / 26 shots)		Goalie stats	Evan Cormier (19 saves / 22 shots); Cameron Zanussi (16 saves / 18 shots)

Erie wins series 4 – 0

===== (2) Sarnia Sting vs. (7) Sault Ste. Marie Greyhounds =====
March 25	Sault Ste. Marie Greyhounds	6 – 3	Sarnia Sting	Sarnia Sports & Entertainment Centre	Recap
Hayden Verbeek (1) - 11:19		First period	4:29 - pp - Travis Konecny (1); 4:57 - pp - Kevin Spinozzi (1)
Gabe Guertler (1) - pp - 2:23; Bobby McIntyre (1) - 3:09; Gabe Guertler (2) - 7:59; Blake Speers (1) - pp - 15:32		Second period	6:13 - pp - Matt Mistele (1)
Boris Katchouk (1) - 7:43		Third period	No scoring
Brandon Halverson (33 saves / 36 shots)		Goalie stats	Charlie Graham (25 saves / 31 shots)

March 27	Sault Ste. Marie Greyhounds	5 – 2	Sarnia Sting	Sarnia Sports & Entertainment Centre	Recap
Zachary Senyshyn (1) - 18:22		First period	No scoring
Boris Katchouk (2) - 5:07; Tim Gettinger (1) - 9:10; Bobby McIntyre (2) - 15:15		Second period	No scoring
Zachary Senyshyn (2) - 14:15		Third period	6:31 - Anthony Salinitri (1); 11:00 - pp - Matt Mistele (2)
Brandon Halverson (39 saves / 41 shots)		Goalie stats	Charlie Graham (18 saves / 22 shots); Justin Fazio (2 saves / 3 shots)

March 29	Sarnia Sting	5 – 2	Sault Ste. Marie Greyhounds	Essar Centre	Recap
Matt Mistele (3) - pp - 13:41; Brandon Lindberg (1) - sh - 18:05		First period	No scoring
Patrick White (1) - 16:47		Second period	19:44 - pp - Blake Speers (2)
Pavel Zacha (1) - pp - 3:26; Matt Mistele (4) - pp - 8:24		Third period	8:38 - Frankie Pucci (1)
Charlie Graham (23 saves / 25 shots)		Goalie stats	Brandon Halverson (31 saves / 36 shots)

March 31	Sarnia Sting	2 – 3	2OT	Sault Ste. Marie Greyhounds	Essar Centre	Recap
Matt Mistele (5) - 10:51		First period		8:01 - pp - Blake Speers (3)
Pavel Zacha (2) - 13:58		Second period		No scoring
No scoring		Third period		10:44 - Colton White (1)
No scoring		Second overtime period		7:24 - pp - Gabe Guertler (3)
Charlie Graham (29 saves / 32 shots)		Goalie stats		Brandon Halverson (40 saves / 42 shots)

April 2	Sault Ste. Marie Greyhounds	1 – 5	Sarnia Sting	Sarnia Sports & Entertainment Centre	Recap
No scoring		First period	6:09 - Matt Mistele (6); 8:49 - pp - Pavel Zacha (3)
Gustav Bouramman (1) - pp - 15:14		Second period	17:12 - sh - Sam Studnicka (1); 19:28 - Ryan McGregor (1)
No scoring		Third period	9:16 - Troy Lajeunesse (1)
Brandon Halverson (29 saves / 34 shots)		Goalie stats	Charlie Graham (27 saves / 28 shots)

April 3	Sarnia Sting	5 – 1	Sault Ste. Marie Greyhounds	Essar Centre	Recap
Jakob Chychrun (1) - pp - 17:26		First period	4:58 - Boris Katchouk (3)
Jordan Kyrou (1) - 14:33		Second period	No scoring
Pavel Zacha (4) - 4:59; Jakob Chychrun (2) - 5:59; Pavel Zacha (5) - pp - 14:00		Third period	No scoring
Charlie Graham (28 saves / 29 shots)		Goalie stats	Brandon Halverson (28 saves / 33 shots)

April 5	Sault Ste. Marie Greyhounds	4 – 3	Sarnia Sting	Sarnia Sports & Entertainment Centre	Recap
Gabe Guertler (4) - 10:37		First period	4:34 - Anthony Salinitri (2)
Bobby McIntyre (3) - 12:57		Second period	16:21 - pp - Pavel Zacha (6)
Blake Speers (4) - 0:27; Boris Katchouk (4) - 7:40		Third period	17:51 - Troy Lajeunesse (2)
Brandon Halverson (36 saves / 39 shots)		Goalie stats	Charlie Graham (13 saves / 17 shots)

Sault Ste. Marie wins series 4 – 3

===== (3) London Knights vs. (6) Owen Sound Attack =====
March 25	Owen Sound Attack	1 – 4	London Knights	Budweiser Gardens	Recap
No scoring		First period	No scoring
No scoring		Second period	10:35 - Max Jones (1); 13:44 - Cliff Pu (1)
Petrus Palmu (1) - pp - 13:18		Third period	9:24 - Aaron Berisha (1); 19:28 - en - Mitch Marner (1)
Michael McNiven (15 saves / 18 shots)		Goalie stats	Tyler Parsons (27 saves / 28 shots)

March 26	Owen Sound Attack	2 – 0	London Knights	Budweiser Gardens	Recap
No scoring		First period	No scoring
Josh Sterk (1) - pp - 17:08		Second period	No scoring
Kevin Hancock (1) - en - 17:23		Third period	No scoring
Michael McNiven (23 saves / 23 shots)		Goalie stats	Tyler Parsons (27 saves / 28 shots)

March 28	London Knights	5 – 1	Owen Sound Attack	Harry Lumley Bayshore Community Centre	Recap
No scoring		First period	18:08 - pp - Damir Sharipzyanov (1)
Matthew Tkachuk (1) - pp - 3:52; Aaron Berisha (2) - 16:18; Mitch Marner (2) - 17:45		Second period	No scoring
Mitch Marner (3) - 0:10; Matthew Tkachuk (2) - 8:23		Third period	No scoring
Tyler Parsons (38 saves / 39 shots)		Goalie stats	Michael McNiven (36 saves / 41 shots)

March 30	London Knights	8 – 5	Owen Sound Attack	Harry Lumley Bayshore Community Centre	Recap
Robert Thomas (1) - 12:03		First period	9:46 - pp - Petrus Palmu (2); 14:29 - Josh Sterk (2)
Matthew Tkachuk (3) - pp - 4:57; Cliff Pu (2) - 11:47; Mitch Marner (4) - 17:40; Matthew Tkachuk (4) - 17:54		Second period	13:42 - pp - Bryson Cianfrone (1)
Matthew Tkachuk (5) - pp - 3:24; Cliff Pu (3) - sh - 9:40; Matthew Tkachuk (6) - en - 19:15		Third period	10:58 - Kevin Hancock (2); 18:54 - Nick Suzuki (1)
Tyler Parsons (34 saves / 39 shots)		Goalie stats	Michael McNiven (30 saves / 37 shots)

April 1	Owen Sound Attack	4 – 3	OT	London Knights	Budweiser Gardens	Recap
Jonah Gadjovich (1) pp - 12:18; Santino Centorame (1) - pp - 16:42		First period		11:47 - Christian Dvorak (1); 15:45 - Cliff Pu (4)
Josh Sterk (3) - pp - 17:28		Second period		No scoring
No scoring		Third period		17:02 - pp - Aaron Berisha (3)
Petrus Palmu (3) - 3:36		First overtime period		No scoring
Michael McNiven (25 saves / 28 shots)		Goalie stats		Tyler Parsons (29 saves / 33 shots)

April 3	London Knights	5 – 2	Owen Sound Attack	Harry Lumley Bayshore Community Centre	Recap
Matthew Tkachuk (7) - 0:52; Christian Dvorak (2) - pp - 19:58		First period	17:03 - pp - Nick Suzuki (2)
Victor Mete (1) - 6:56		Second period	No scoring
Cliff Pu (5) - 1:06; Matthew Tkachuk (8) - en - 18:37		Third period	14:44 - pp - Josh Sterk (4)
Tyler Parsons (31 saves / 33 shots)		Goalie stats	Michael McNiven (25 saves / 29 shots)

London wins series 4 – 2

===== (4) Kitchener Rangers vs. (5) Windsor Spitfires =====
March 24	Windsor Spitfires	5 – 6	OT	Kitchener Rangers	Kitchener Memorial Auditorium Complex	Recap
Aaron Luchuk (1) - 4:38; Christian Fischer (1) - pp - 6:41; Jalen Chatfield (1) - 9:36		First period		12:58 - pp - Brandon Robinson (1); 18:30 - pp - Ryan MacInnis (1)
Logan Stanley (1) - 18:22		Second period		2:39 - pp - Gustaf Franzen (1); 15:52 - Adam Mascherin (1)
Bradley Latour (1) 15:02		Third period		3:56 - Ryan MacInnis (2)
No scoring		First overtime period		2:39 - Brandon Robinson (2)
Mario Culina (32 saves / 38 shots)		Goalie stats		Luke Opilka (4 saves / 7 shots); Dawson Carty (29 saves / 31 shots)

March 26	Windsor Spitfires	4 – 6	Kitchener Rangers	Kitchener Memorial Auditorium Complex	Recap
Mikhail Sergachev (1) - 18:33		First period	15:19 - Nick Magyar (1)
Jalen Chatfield (2) - 0:40; Mads Eller (1) - 4:19		Second period	10:02 - Brandon Robinson (3); 14:55 - pp - David Miller (1)
Mikhail Sergachev (2) - pp - 10:34		Third period	6:21 - Miles Liberati (1); 9:13 - Connor Bunnaman (1); 18:28 - en - Brandon Robinson (4)
Mario Culina (20 saves / 25 shots)		Goalie stats	Dawson Carty (31 saves / 35 shots)

March 28	Kitchener Rangers	2 – 1	Windsor Spitfires	WFCU Centre	Recap
Jeremy Bracco (1) - 19:25		First period	No scoring
No scoring		Second period	No scoring
Brandon Robinson (5) - 18:34		Third period	9:25 - pp - Aaron Luchuk (2)
Dawson Carty (26 saves / 27 shots)		Goalie stats	Michael DiPietro (28 saves / 30 shots)

March 30	Kitchener Rangers	4 – 5	OT	Windsor Spitfires	WFCU Centre	Recap
Adam Mascherin (2) - pp - 1:08; Adam Mascherin (3) - 18:14		First period		No scoring
No scoring		Second period		15:53 - pp - Brendan Lemieux (1); 17:19 - pp - Brendan Lemieux (2); 17:54 - pp - Brendan Lemieux (3)
David Miller (2) - 14:52; Gustaf Franzen (2) - 16:38		Third period		8:29 - Bradley Latour (2)
No scoring		First overtime period		10:19 - pp - Bradley Latour (3)
Dawson Carty (30 saves / 35 shots)		Goalie stats		Michael DiPietro (17 saves / 21 shots)

April 1	Windsor Spitfires	2 – 5	Kitchener Rangers	Kitchener Memorial Auditorium Complex	Recap
Gabriel Vilardi (1) - 9:38		First period	0:20 - Brandon Robinson (6)
Brendan Lemieux (4) - pp - 15:27		Second period	16:30 - pp - Ryan MacInnis (3); 18:12 - pp - Jeremy Bracco (2); 18:28 - Connor Hall (1)
No scoring		Third period	16:53 - pp - Adam Mascherin (4)
Michael DiPietro (28 saves / 33 shots)		Goalie stats	Dawson Carty (28 saves / 30 shots)

Kitchener wins series 4 – 1

=== Conference semifinals ===
==== Eastern conference semifinals ====
===== (1) Kingston Frontenacs vs. (4) Niagara IceDogs =====
April 7	Niagara IceDogs	3 – 1	Kingston Frontenacs	Rogers K-Rock Centre	Recap
Vince Dunn (3) - 11:07		First period	No scoring
Anthony DiFruscia (2) - pp - 6:59		Second period	No scoring
Aaron Haydon (1) - sh - en - 19:39		Third period	16:40 - pp - Lawson Crouse (5)
Alex Nedeljkovic (31 saves / 32 shots)		Goalie stats	Jeremy Helvig (29 saves / 31 shots)

April 8	Niagara IceDogs	6 – 5	OT	Kingston Frontenacs	Rogers K-Rock Centre	Recap
Kyle Langdon (2) - 12:14; Vince Dunn (4) - 12:54; Pavel Jenyš (6) - pp - 18:02		First period		2:08 - pp - Conor McGlynn (1)
No scoring		Second period		6:21 - pp - Michael Dal Colle (4)
Ryan Mantha (2) - 2:02; Aleksander Mikulovich (1) - 4:43		Third period		10:13 - Michael Dal Colle (5); 11:37 - pp - Michael Dal Colle (6); 14:54 - Juho Lammikko (2)
Anthony DiFruscia (3) - 18:57		First overtime period		No scoring
Alex Nedeljkovic (47 saves / 52 shots)		Goalie stats		Jeremy Helvig (24 saves / 29 shots); Lucas Peressini (10 saves / 11 shots)

April 10	Kingston Frontenacs	2 – 3	OT	Niagara IceDogs	Meridian Centre	Recap
Lawson Crouse (6) - 13:22		First period		No scoring
No scoring		Second period		3:57 - Josh Ho-Sang (3)
Juho Lammikko (3) - sh - 18:02		Third period		10:47 - Johnny Corneil (1)
No scoring		First overtime period		1:07 - Aaron Haydon (2)
Lucas Peressini (32 saves / 35 shots)		Goalie stats		Alex Nedeljkovic (32 saves / 34 shots)

April 13	Kingston Frontenacs	1 – 3	Niagara IceDogs	Meridian Centre	Recap
No scoring		First period	11:58 - pp - Brendan Perlini (4); 17:16 - Brendan Perlini (5)
No scoring		Second period	No scoring
Lawson Crouse (7) - sh - 0:43		Third period	1:00 - pp - Johnny Corneil (2)
Lucas Peressini (26 saves / 29 shots)		Goalie stats	Alex Nedeljkovic (32 saves / 33 shots)

Niagara wins series 4 – 0

===== (2) Barrie Colts vs. (3) North Bay Battalion =====
April 7	North Bay Battalion	2 – 5	Barrie Colts	Barrie Molson Centre	Recap
No scoring		First period	11:38 - pp - Andrew Mangiapane (5); 13:51 - Andrew Mangiapane (6); 15:28 - Josh Carrick (1)
No scoring		Second period	1:52 - Josh Carrick (2)
Steve Harland (3) - 4:11; Kyle Wood (2) - pp - 16:09		Third period	18:55 - en - Justin Scott (11)
Jake Smith (25 saves / 29 shots)		Goalie stats	Mackenzie Blackwood (32 saves / 34 shots)

April 11	North Bay Battalion	2 – 3	OT	Barrie Colts	Barrie Molson Centre	Recap
Michael Amadio (10) - 13:16; Michael Amadio (11) - 13:45		First period		No scoring
No scoring		Second period		10:48 - Justin Scott (12)
No scoring		Third period		17:43 - Anthony Stefano (2)
No scoring		First overtime period		2:35 - Justin Scott (13)
Jake Smith (33 saves / 36 shots)		Goalie stats		Mackenzie Blackwood (34 saves / 36 shots)

April 12	Barrie Colts	4 – 2	North Bay Battalion	North Bay Memorial Gardens	Recap
Kevin Labanc (5) - sh - 7:34; Michael Webster (1) - 11:44		First period	No scoring
Justin Murray (1) - 8:43		Second period	0:29 - Mathew Santos (5); 17:18 - pp - Michael Amadio (12)
Justin Scott (14) - 12:24		Third period	No scoring
Mackenzie Blackwood (24 saves / 26 shots)		Goalie stats	Jake Smith (22 saves / 26 shots)

April 14	Barrie Colts	6 – 0	North Bay Battalion	North Bay Memorial Gardens	Recap
Giordano Finoro (1) - 12:15; Kevin Labanc (6) - 18:15		First period	No scoring
Andrew Mangiapane (7) - 4:12		Second period	No scoring
Andrew Mangiapane (8) - 6:38; Cordell James (1) - 15:05; Cordell James (2) - pp - 19:26		Third period	No scoring
Mackenzie Blackwood (29 saves / 29 shots)		Goalie stats	Jake Smith (20 saves / 26 shots)

Barrie wins series 4 – 0

==== Western conference semifinals ====
===== (1) Erie Otters vs. (7) Sault Ste. Marie Greyhounds =====
April 8	Sault Ste. Marie Greyhounds	2 – 3	OT	Erie Otters	Erie Insurance Arena	Recap
Boris Katchouk (5) - 8:28; Boris Katchouk (6) - sh - 19:37		First period		2:24 - Jake Marchment (1)
No scoring		Second period		No scoring
No scoring		Third period		18:33 - Darren Raddysh (1)
No scoring		First overtime period		0:58 - Darren Raddysh (2)
Brandon Halverson (32 saves / 35 shots)		Goalie stats		Devin Williams (14 saves / 16 shots)

April 9	Sault Ste. Marie Greyhounds	1 – 3	Erie Otters	Erie Insurance Arena	Recap
No scoring		First period	No scoring
No scoring		Second period	3:51 - Nick Betz (2); 9:50 - Dylan Strome (5)
Blake Speers (5) - pp - 4:18		Third period	19:31 - en - Dylan Strome (6)
Brandon Halverson (21 saves / 23 shots)		Goalie stats	Devin Williams (15 saves / 16 shots)

April 11	Erie Otters	2 – 3	Sault Ste. Marie Greyhounds	Essar Centre	Recap
Kyle Pettit (4) - 14:25		First period	No scoring
No scoring		Second period	16:29 - Morgan Frost (1)
Dylan Strome (7) - 11:47		Third period	7:15 - Bobby McIntyre (4); 19:37 - Bobby McIntyre (5)
Devin Williams (19 saves / 22 shots)		Goalie stats	Brandon Halverson (25 saves / 27 shots)

April 13	Erie Otters	5 – 2	Sault Ste. Marie Greyhounds	Essar Centre	Recap
Alex DeBrincat (4) - 4:31; Jake Marchment (2) - 7:52		First period	17:05 - Jack Kopacka (1)
No scoring		Second period	No scoring
Darren Raddysh (3) - 2:45; Nick Betz (3) - 8:19; Travis Dermott (3) - en - 18:47		Third period	8:48 - Blake Speers (6)
Devin Williams (15 saves / 17 shots)		Goalie stats	Brandon Halverson (40 saves / 44 shots)

April 15	Sault Ste. Marie Greyhounds	2 – 5	Erie Otters	Erie Insurance Arena	Recap
Jack Kopacka (2) - 13:15		First period	10:07 - Alex DeBrincat (5)
Mac Hollowell (1) - 11:30		Second period	4:48 - pp - Dylan Strome (8); 19:35 - pp - Taylor Raddysh (4)
No scoring		Third period	11:13 - Dylan Strome (9); 19:00 - en - Dylan Strome (10)
Brandon Halverson (25 saves / 29 shots)		Goalie stats	Devin Williams (12 saves / 14 shots)

Erie wins series 4 – 1

===== (3) London Knights vs. (4) Kitchener Rangers =====
April 8	Kitchener Rangers	3 – 6	London Knights	Budweiser Gardens	Recap
Ryan MacInnis (4) - 19:42		First period	1:40 - Christian Dvorak (3)
Connor Bunnaman (2) - 17:27		Second period	6:10 - pp - Christian Dvorak (4); 9:09 - J.J. Piccinich (1); 15:04 - pp - Olli Juolevi (1)
Adam Mascherin (5) - 18:05		Third period	18:26 - Mitch Marner (5); 19:14 - en - Christian Dvorak (5)
Dawson Carty (20 saves / 25 shots)		Goalie stats	Tyler Parsons (20 saves / 23 shots)

April 10	Kitchener Rangers	3 – 5	London Knights	Budweiser Gardens	Recap
No scoring		First period	No scoring
David Miller (3) - 7:37; Adam Mascherin (6) - 10:20; Darby Llewellyn (1) - 12:23		Second period	6:15 - pp - Christian Dvorak (6); 16:06 - Matthew Tkachuk (9); 19:56 - sh - Mitch Marner (6)
No scoring		Third period	6:35 - Cliff Pu (6); 19:23 - en - Victor Mete (2)
Dawson Carty (26 saves / 30 shots)		Goalie stats	Tyler Parsons (26 saves / 29 shots)

April 12	London Knights	2 – 1	OT	Kitchener Rangers	Kitchener Memorial Auditorium Complex	Recap
No scoring		First period		8:25 - Ryan MacInnis (5)
No scoring		Second period		No scoring
Matthew Tkachuk (10) - 5:09		Third period		No scoring
Chandler Yakimowicz (1) - 7:51		First overtime period		No scoring
Tyler Parsons (30 saves / 31 shots)		Goalie stats		Dawson Carty (32 saves / 34 shots)

April 14	London Knights	6 – 4	Kitchener Rangers	Kitchener Memorial Auditorium Complex	Recap
No scoring		First period	9:41 - Darby Llewellyn (2); 19:05 - Jeremy Bracco (3)
Aaron Berisha (4) - 9:27; Mitch Marner (7) - 15:45		Second period	5:11 - pp - Frank Hora (1); 15:02 - Darby Llewellyn (3)
Cliff Pu (7) - 4:31; Mitch Marner (8) - 16:36; Mitch Marner (9) - 16:46; Mitch Marner (10) - en - 18:23		Third period	No scoring
Tyler Parsons (20 saves / 24 shots)		Goalie stats	Dawson Carty (24 saves / 29 shots)

London wins series 4 – 0

=== Conference finals ===
==== Eastern conference finals ====
===== (2) Barrie Colts vs. (4) Niagara IceDogs =====
April 21	Niagara IceDogs	3 – 2	Barrie Colts	Barrie Molson Centre	Recap
No scoring		First period	9:12 - Justin Scott (15)
No scoring		Second period	No scoring
Blake Siebenaler (1) - pp - 11:37; Josh Ho-Sang (4) - 12:31; Jordan Maletta (2) - 12:45		Third period	10:56 - sh - Andrew Mangiapane (9)
Alex Nedeljkovic (27 saves / 29 shots)		Goalie stats	Mackenzie Blackwood (39 saves / 42 shots)

April 23	Niagara IceDogs	4 – 1	Barrie Colts	Barrie Molson Centre	Recap
No scoring		First period	No scoring
Stephen Harper (1) - 0:30; Anthony DeFruscia (4) - pp - 13:24		Second period	No scoring
Graham Knott (2) - 6:32; Brendan Perlini (6) - 11:05		Third period	1:40 - pp - Andrew Mangiapane (10)
Alex Nedeljkovic (27 saves / 28 shots)		Goalie stats	Mackenzie Blackwood (33 saves / 37 shots)

April 25	Barrie Colts	3 – 6	Niagara IceDogs	Meridian Centre	Recap
Julius Nättinen (2) - pp - 18:24		First period	2:32 - Christopher Paquette (2)
Adrian Carbonara (1) - 2:49; Justin Scott (16) - 3:09		Second period	1:01 - Stephen Harper (2); 3:51 - Josh Ho-Sang (5); 9:28 - pp - Pavel Jenyš (7); 18:38 - Josh Wesley (1)
No scoring		Third period	18:43 - en - Stephen Harper (3)
Mackenzie Blackwood (36 saves / 41 shots)		Goalie stats	Alex Nedeljkovic (19 saves / 22 shots)

April 27	Barrie Colts	2 – 3	Niagara IceDogs	Meridian Centre	Recap
Justin Scott (17) - 17:46		First period	19:40 - Stephen Harper (4)
No scoring		Second period	3:33 - Johnathon Schaefer (1); 6:31 - Josh Wesley (2)
Kody Gagnon (1) - 9:42		Third period	No scoring
Mackenzie Blackwood (26 saves / 29 shots)		Goalie stats	Alex Nedeljkovic (27 saves / 29 shots)

Niagara wins series 4 – 0

==== Western conference finals ====
===== (1) Erie Otters vs. (3) London Knights =====
April 20	London Knights	7 – 4	Erie Otters	Erie Insurance Arena	Recap
Christian Dvorak (7) - pp - 5:56; Matthew Tkachuk (11) - pp - 8:18; Mitch Marner (11) - pp - 10:31; Christian Dvorak (8) - 11:48		First period	1:34 - Kyle Maksimovich (5)
Matthew Tkachuk (12) - 0:43		Second period	6:11 - Alex DeBrincat (6); 18:02 - Alex DeBrincat (7)
Olli Juolevi (2) - 7:47; Matthew Tkachuk (13) - en - 19:01		Third period	9:28 - Alex DeBrincat (8)
Tyler Parsons (26 saves / 30 shots)		Goalie stats	Devin Williams (19 saves / 25 shots)

April 24	London Knights	6 – 1	Erie Otters	Erie Insurance Arena	Recap
Mitch Marner (12) - 0:56; Daniel Bernhardt (1) - 9:27; Aaron Berisha (5) - 13:55		First period	No scoring
Daniel Bernhardt (2) - 2:16		Second period	16:15 - pp - Darren Raddysh (4)
Matthew Tkachuk (14) - pp - 16:55; Nicolas Mattinen (1) - pp - 19:50		Third period	No scoring
Tyler Parsons (26 saves / 27 shots)		Goalie stats	Devin Williams (19 saves / 25 shots); Jake Lawr (0 saves / 0 shots)

April 26	Erie Otters	1 – 5	London Knights	Budweiser Gardens	Recap
No scoring		First period	4:42 - Christian Dvorak (9)
No scoring		Second period	4:35 - Owen MacDonald (1); 14:08 - Matthew Tkachuk (15); 17:45 - Mitch Marner (13)
Jake Marchment (3) - 0:22		Third period	12:56 - pp - Mitch Marner (14)
Devin Williams (20 saves / 25 shots)		Goalie stats	Tyler Parsons (26 saves / 27 shots)

April 27	Erie Otters	1 – 5	London Knights	Budweiser Gardens	Recap
No scoring		First period	12:14 - pp - Matthew Tkachuk (16); 19:35 - J.J. Piccinich (2)
Jake Marchment (4) - pp - 2:44		Second period	15:56 - Owen MacDonald (2)
No scoring		Third period	9:44 - pp - Christian Dvorak (10); 16:42 - en - sh - Mitch Marner (15)
Devin Williams (18 saves / 22 shots)		Goalie stats	Tyler Parsons (27 saves / 28 shots)

London wins series 4 – 0

=== J. Ross Robertson Cup ===
==== (W3) London Knights vs. (E4) Niagara IceDogs ====
May 5	Niagara IceDogs	1 – 4	London Knights	Budweiser Gardens	Recap
No scoring		First period	No scoring
Pavel Jenyš (8) - 2:42		Second period	6:39 - Owen MacDonald (3); 11:19 - sh - Chandler Yakimowicz (2); 19:35 - Christian Dvorak (11)
No scoring		Third period	10:03 - pp - Mitch Marner (16)
Alex Nedeljkovic (26 saves / 30 shots)		Goalie stats	Tyler Parsons (27 saves / 28 shots)

May 7	Niagara IceDogs	1 – 6	London Knights	Budweiser Gardens	Recap
Stephen Harper (5) - 6:04		First period	18:44 - pp - Matthew Tkachuk (17)
No scoring		Second period	6:54 - Matthew Tkachuk (18); 10:42 - Owen MacDonald (4); 19:31 - Victor Mete (3)
No scoring		Third period	1:10 - Christian Dvorak (12); 2:25 - pp - Matthew Tkachuk (19)
Alex Nedeljkovic (17 saves / 23 shots); Stephen Dhillon (2 saves / 2 shots)		Goalie stats	Tyler Parsons (24 saves / 25 shots); Brendan Burke (3 saves / 3 shots)

May 9	London Knights	6 – 5	OT	Niagara IceDogs	Meridian Centre	Recap
Matthew Tkachuk (20) - 0:32; Cliff Pu (8) - sh - 19:07		First period		1:09 - Ryan Mantha (3); 6:24 - pp - Stephen Harper (6); 15:28 - pp - Vince Dunn (5); 17:21 - Josh Ho-Sang (6)
Olli Juolevi (3) - 9:32		Second period		6:31 - Aleksander Mikulovich (2)
Christian Dvorak (13) - 7:42; Victor Mete (4) - 11:15		Third period		No scoring
Owen MacDonald (5) - 2:58		First overtime period		No scoring
Tyler Parsons (25 saves / 30 shots)		Goalie stats		Alex Nedeljkovic (33 saves / 39 shots)

May 11	London Knights	1 – 0	Niagara IceDogs	Meridian Centre	Recap
Christian Dvorak (14) - 16:37		First period	No scoring
No scoring		Second period	No scoring
No scoring		Third period	No scoring
Tyler Parsons (18 saves / 18 shots)		Goalie stats	Alex Nedeljkovic (28 saves / 29 shots)

London wins series 4 – 0

=== J. Ross Robertson Cup Champions Roster ===
2015-16 London Knights
Goaltenders: (United States) 1 – Tyler Parsons; (United States) 50 – Brendan Burke	Defencemen: (Canada) 2 – Evan Bouchard; (Canada) 3 – Nicolas Mattinen; (Finland) 4 – Olli Juolevi; (United States) 14 – Brandon Crawley; (Canada) 44 – Jacob Graves; (Canada) 74 – Aiden Jamieson; (United States) 86 – Chris Martenet; (Canada) 98 – Victor Mete	Wingers: (United States) 7 – Matthew Tkachuk; (Sweden) 20 – Daniel Bernhardt; (United States) 21 – Chandler Yakimowicz; (Canada) 28 – Chad Heffernan; (United States) 49 – Max Jones; (United States) 67 – Kole Sherwood; (Canada) 72 – Aaron Berisha; (United States) 84 – J.J. Piccinich; (Canada) 93 – Mitch Marner – C	Centres: (United States) 10 – Christian Dvorak – C; (Canada) 11 – Owen MacDonald; (Canada) 27 – Robert Thomas; (Canada) 63 – Cliff Pu; Coach: (Canada) Dale Hunter; General Manager: (Canada) Basil McRae

=== Playoff scoring leaders ===
Note: GP = Games played; G = Goals; A = Assists; Pts = Points; PIM = Penalty minutes

Player	Team	GP	G	A	Pts	PIM
Mitch Marner	London Knights	18	16	28	44	8
Matthew Tkachuk	London Knights	18	20	20	40	42
Christian Dvorak	London Knights	18	14	21	35	4
Kevin Labanc	Barrie Colts	15	6	20	26	24
Josh Ho-Sang	Niagara IceDogs	17	6	20	26	8
Dylan Strome	Erie Otters	13	10	11	21	12
Andrew Mangiapane	Barrie Colts	15	10	11	21	14
Justin Scott	Barrie Colts	15	17	3	20	8
Alex DeBrincat	Erie Otters	13	8	11	19	13
Michael Amadio	North Bay Battalion	11	12	6	18	10
Michael Dal Colle	Kingston Frontenacs	9	6	12	18	2

=== Playoff leading goaltenders ===
Note: GP = Games played; Mins = Minutes played; W = Wins; L = Losses: OTL = Overtime losses; SL = Shootout losses; GA = Goals Allowed; SO = Shutouts; GAA = Goals against average

Player	Team	GP	Mins	W	L	GA	SO	Sv%	GAA
Tyler Parsons	London Knights	18	1086	16	2	39	1	0.925	2.15
Jeremy Helvig	Kingston Frontenacs	7	325	3	1	13	2	0.908	2.40
Mackenzie Blackwood	Barrie Colts	13	797	6	5	36	1	0.914	2.71
Alex Nedeljkovic	Niagara IceDogs	17	1026	12	5	48	0	0.903	2.81
Jack Flinn	Mississauga Steelheads	7	447	3	4	21	1	0.913	2.82

== Awards ==
J. Ross Robertson Cup:	London Knights
Hamilton Spectator Trophy:	Erie Otters
Bobby Orr Trophy:	Niagara IceDogs
Wayne Gretzky Trophy:	London Knights
Emms Trophy:	Barrie Colts
Leyden Trophy:	Kingston Frontenacs
Holody Trophy:	Erie Otters
Bumbacco Trophy:	Sarnia Sting
Red Tilson Trophy:	Mitch Marner, London Knights
Eddie Powers Memorial Trophy:	Kevin Labanc, Barrie Colts
Matt Leyden Trophy:	Kris Knoblauch, Erie Otters
Jim Mahon Memorial Trophy:	Kevin Labanc, Barrie Colts
Max Kaminsky Trophy:	Mikhail Sergachev, Windsor Spitfires
OHL Goaltender of the Year:	Mackenzie Blackwood, Barrie Colts
Jack Ferguson Award:	Ryan Merkley, Guelph Storm
Dave Pinkney Trophy:	Tyler Parsons & Brendan Burke, London Knights
Emms Family Award:	Alexander Nylander, Mississauga Steelheads
F. W. "Dinty" Moore Trophy:	Michael DiPietro, Windsor Spitfires
Dan Snyder Memorial Trophy:	Will Petschenig, Saginaw Spirit
William Hanley Trophy:	Mike Amadio, North Bay Battalion
Leo Lalonde Memorial Trophy:	Kevin Labanc, Barrie Colts
Bobby Smith Trophy:	Nicolas Hague, Mississauga Steelheads
Roger Neilson Memorial Award:	Damian Bourne, Mississauga Steelheads
Ivan Tennant Memorial Award:	Kyle Keyser, Flint Firebirds
Mickey Renaud Captain's Trophy:	Michael Webster, Barrie Colts
Tim Adams Memorial Trophy:	Andrei Berezinskiy, York Simcoe Express
Wayne Gretzky 99 Award:	Mitch Marner, London Knights
Bill Long Award:	Pat Casey, Peterborough Petes

== All-Star teams ==
The OHL All-Star Teams were selected by the OHL's General Managers.

=== First team ===
- Christian Dvorak, Centre, London Knights
- Matthew Tkachuk, Left Wing, London Knights
- Mitch Marner, Right Wing, London Knights
- Mikhail Sergachev, Defence, Windsor Spitfires
- Rasmus Andersson, Defence, Barrie Colts
- Mackenzie Blackwood, Goaltender, Barrie Colts
- Kris Knoblauch, Coach, Erie Otters

=== Second team ===
- Michael Amadio, Centre, North Bay Battalion
- Andrew Mangiapane, Left Wing, Barrie Colts
- Kevin Labanc, Right Wing, Barrie Colts
- Travis Dermott, Defence, Erie Otters
- Jakob Chychrun, Defence, Sarnia Sting
- Devin Williams, Goaltender, Erie Otters
- Rocky Thompson, Coach, Windsor Spitfires

=== Third team ===
- Dylan Strome, Centre, Erie Otters
- Alexander Nylander, Left Wing, Mississauga Steelheads
- Alex DeBrincat, Right Wing, Erie Otters
- Olli Juolevi, Defence, London Knights
- Roland McKeown, Defence, Kingston Frontenacs
- Alex Nedeljkovic, Goaltender, Niagara IceDogs
- Mike Van Ryn, Coach, Kitchener Rangers

== 2016 OHL Priority Selection ==
On April 9, 2016, the OHL conducted the 2016 Ontario Hockey League Priority Selection. The Guelph Storm held the first overall pick in the draft, and selected Ryan Merkley from the Toronto Jr. Canadiens of the GTHL. Merkley was awarded the Jack Ferguson Award, awarded to the top pick in the draft.

Below are the players who were selected in the first round of the 2016 Ontario Hockey League Priority Selection.

#	Player	Nationality	OHL team	Hometown	Minor team
1	Ryan Merkley (D)	Canada	Guelph Storm	Mississauga, Ontario	Toronto Jr. Canadiens (GTHL)
2	Owen Lalonde (D)	Canada	Sudbury Wolves	Windsor, Ontario	Windsor Jr. Spitfires (MHAO)
3	Connor Roberts (C)	Canada	Hamilton Bulldogs	Owen Sound, Ontario	Grey-Bruce Highlanders (OMHA-SCTA)
4	Blade Jenkins (C)	United States	Saginaw Spirit	Jackson, Michigan	Detroit Compuware 16U (HPHL)
5	Ty Dellandrea (C)	Canada	Flint Firebirds	Port Perry, Ontario	Central Ontario Wolves (OMHA-EHL)
6	Danil Antropov (RW)	Canada	Oshawa Generals	Toronto, Ontario	Toronto Marlboros (GTHL)
7	Kirill Nizhnikov (RW)	Russia	Mississauga Steelheads	Moscow, Russia	Toronto Jr. Canadiens (GTHL)
8	Pavel Gogolev (LW)	Russia	Peterborough Petes	Moscow, Russia	CIH Academy White (OEMHL)
9	Barrett Hayton (C)	Canada	Sault Ste. Marie Greyhounds	Peterborough, Ontario	Toronto Red Wings (GTHL)
10	Aidan Dudas (C)	Canada	Owen Sound Attack	Parry Sound, Ontario	North Central Predators (OMHA-EHL)
11	Peter Stratis (D)	Canada	Ottawa 67's	Toronto, Ontario	Mississauga Rebels (GTHL)
12	Akil Thomas (C)	Canada	Niagara IceDogs	Toronto, Ontario	Toronto Marlboros (GTHL)
13	Adam McMaster (C)	Canada	North Bay Battalion	Beamsville, Ontario	Niagara North Stars (OMHA-SCTA)
14	Tyler Tucker (D)	Canada	Barrie Colts	Longlac, Ontario	Toronto Titans (GTHL)
15	Tyler Weiss (C)	United States	Sarnia Sting	Raleigh, North Carolina	Don Mills Flyers (GTHL)
16	Giovanni Vallati (D)	Canada	Kitchener Rangers	Toronto, Ontario	Vaughan Kings (GTHL)
17	Nathan Dunkley (C)	Canada	Kingston Frontenacs	Campbellford, Ontario	Quinte Red Devils (OMHA-EHL)
18	Liam Foudy (C)	Canada	London Knights	Toronto, Ontario	Markham Majors (GTHL)
19	Allan McShane (C)	Canada	Erie Otters	Toronto, Ontario	Toronto Marlboros (GTHL)
20	Jack McBain (C)	Canada	Barrie Colts	Toronto, Ontario	Don Mills Flyers (GTHL)

== 2016 NHL entry draft ==
On June 24–25, 2016, the National Hockey League conducted the 2016 NHL entry draft held at the First Niagara Center in Buffalo, New York. In total, 48 players from the Ontario Hockey League were selected in the draft. Olli Juolevi of the London Knights was the first player from the OHL to be selected, as he was taken with the fifth overall pick by the Vancouver Canucks.

Below are the players selected from OHL teams at the NHL Entry Draft.

Round	#	Player	Nationality	NHL team	Hometown	OHL team
1	5	Olli Juolevi (D)	Finland	Vancouver Canucks	Helsinki, Finland	London Knights
1	6	Matthew Tkachuk (LW)	United States	Calgary Flames	St. Louis, Missouri	London Knights
1	8	Alexander Nylander (LW)	Sweden	Buffalo Sabres	Södertälje, Sweden	Mississauga Steelheads
1	9	Mikhail Sergachev (D)	Russia	Montreal Canadiens	Nizhnekamsk, Russia	Windsor Spitfires
1	11	Logan Brown (C)	United States	Ottawa Senators	Chesterfield, Missouri	Windsor Spitfires
1	12	Michael McLeod (C)	Canada	New Jersey Devils	Mississauga, Ontario	Mississauga Steelheads
1	16	Jakob Chychrun (D)	Canada	Arizona Coyotes	Boca Raton, Florida	Sarnia Sting
1	18	Logan Stanley (D)	Canada	Winnipeg Jets	Waterloo, Ontario	Windsor Spitfires
1	24	Max Jones (LW)	United States	Anaheim Ducks	Orion, Michigan	London Knights
2	35	Jordan Kyrou (RW)	Canada	Philadelphia Flyers	Toronto, Ontario	Sarnia Sting
2	38	Adam Mascherin (LW)	Canada	Florida Panthers	Maple, Ontario	Kitchener Rangers
2	39	Alex DeBrincat (RW)	United States	Chicago Blackhawks	Farmington Hills, Michigan	Erie Otters
2	41	Nathan Bastien (RW)	Canada	New Jersey Devils	Kitchener, Ontario	Mississauga Steelheads
2	44	Boris Katchouk (LW)	Canada	Tampa Bay Lightning	Waterloo, Ontario	Sault Ste. Marie Greyhounds
2	46	Givani Smith (RW)	Canada	Detroit Red Wings	Toronto, Ontario	Guelph Storm
2	54	Tyler Parsons (G)	United States	Calgary Flames	Chesterfield, Michigan	London Knights
2	58	Taylor Raddysh (RW)	Canada	Tampa Bay Lightning	Caledon, Ontario	Erie Otters
3	63	Markus Niemelainen (D)	Finland	Edmonton Oilers	Kuopio, Finland	Saginaw Spirit
3	68	Cam Dineen (D)	United States	Arizona Coyotes	Toms River, New Jersey	North Bay Battalion
3	69	Cliff Pu (C)	Canada	Buffalo Sabres	Richmond Hill, Ontario	London Knights
3	70	Will Bitten (LW)	Canada	Montreal Canadiens	Gloucester, Ontario	Flint Firebirds
3	77	Connor Hall (D)	Canada	Pittsburgh Penguins	Cambridge, Ontario	Kitchener Rangers
3	81	Sean Day (D)	Canada	New York Rangers	Rochester, Michigan	Mississauga Steelheads
4	93	Jack Kopacka (LW)	United States	Anaheim Ducks	Metamora, Michigan	Sault Ste. Marie Greyhounds
4	94	Jonathan Ang (C)	Canada	Florida Panthers	Markham, Ontario	Peterborough Petes
4	100	Victor Mete (D)	Canada	Montreal Canadiens	Woodbridge, Ontario	London Knights
4	101	Keaton Middleton (D)	Canada	Toronto Maple Leafs	Stratford, Ontario	Saginaw Spirit
4	105	Evan Cormier (G)	Canada	New Jersey Devils	Bowmanville, Ontario	Saginaw Spirit
4	109	Connor Bunnaman (C)	Canada	Philadelphia Flyers	Guelph, Ontario	Kitchener Rangers
4	114	Riley Stillman (D)	Canada	Florida Panthers	Peterborough, Ontario	Oshawa Generals
5	123	Dylan Wells (G)	Canada	Edmonton Oilers	St. Catharines, Ontario	Peterborough Petes
5	134	Jeremy Helvig (G)	Canada	Carolina Hurricanes	Markham, Ontario	Kingston Frontenacs
5	137	Jordan Sambrook (D)	Canada	Detroit Red Wings	Markham, Ontario	Erie Otters
5	140	Cole Candella (D)	Canada	Vancouver Canucks	Mississauga, Ontario	Hamilton Bulldogs
5	141	Tim Gettinger (LW)	United States	New York Rangers	North Olmsted, Ohio	Sault Ste. Marie Greyhounds
5	146	Nicholas Caamano (LW)	Canada	Dallas Stars	Ancaster, Ontario	Flint Firebirds
5	148	Christopher Paquette (C)	Canada	Tampa Bay Lightning	Kingston, Ontario	Niagara IceDogs
6	160	Michael Pezzetta (C)	Canada	Montreal Canadiens	Toronto, Ontario	Sudbury Wolves
6	164	Noah Carroll (D)	Canada	Carolina Hurricanes	Strathroy, Ontario	Guelph Storm
6	172	Anthony Salinitri (C)	Canada	Philadelphia Flyers	Windsor, Ontario	Sarnia Sting
6	179	Nicolas Mattinen (D)	Canada	Toronto Maple Leafs	Ottawa, Ontario	London Knights
6	180	Mark Shoemaker (D)	Canada	San Jose Sharks	Mississauga, Ontario	North Bay Battalion
7	186	Stepan Falkovsky (D)	Belarus	Calgary Flames	Minsk, Belarus	Ottawa 67's
7	189	Austin Osmanski (D)	United States	Buffalo Sabres	East Aurora, New York	Mississauga Steelheads
7	191	Travis Barron (LW)	Canada	Colorado Avalanche	Belfountain, Ontario	Ottawa 67's
7	194	Brett McKenzie (C)	Canada	Vancouver Canucks	Vars, Ontario	North Bay Battalion
7	196	Dmitry Sokolov (RW)	Russia	Minnesota Wild	Omsk, Russia	Sudbury Wolves
7	202	Jacob Friend (D)	Canada	Los Angeles Kings	Bowmanville, Ontario	Owen Sound Attack

== 2016 CHL Import Draft ==
On June 28, 2016, the Canadian Hockey League conducted the 2016 CHL Import Draft, in which teams in all three CHL leagues participate in. The Guelph Storm held the first pick in the draft by a team in the OHL, and selected Dmitri Samorukov from Russia with their selection.

Below are the players who were selected in the first round by Ontario Hockey League teams in the 2016 CHL Import Draft.

#	Player	Nationality	OHL team	Hometown	Last team
2	Dmitri Samorukov (D)	Russia	Guelph Storm	Volgograd, Russia	Moscow CSKA
5	Jachym Kondelik (LW)	Czech Republic	Sudbury Wolves	České Budějovice, Czech Republic	Ceske Budejovice Jr. B
8	Michal Steinocher (D)	Czech Republic	Flint Firebirds	Louny, Czech Republic	Slavia Praha Jr. B
11	Marian Studenic (LW)	Slovakia	Hamilton Bulldogs	Holíč, Slovakia	Skalica Jr.
14	Filip Hronek (D)	Czech Republic	Saginaw Spirit	Býšť, Czech Republic	Hradec Kralove Mountfield HC
17	Eeli Tolvanen (RW)	Finland	Oshawa Generals	Espoo, Finland	Sioux City Musketeers
20	Jacob Moverare (D)	Sweden	Mississauga Steelheads	Östersund, Sweden	HV71 Jr.
23	Matyas Svoboda (LW)	Czech Republic	Peterborough Petes	Údlice, Czech Republic	Chomutov KLH Jr. B
26	Otto Makinen (C)	Finland	Sault Ste. Marie Greyhounds	Tampere, Finland	Tappara Tampere Jr.
29	Maxim Sushko (LW)	Belarus	Owen Sound Attack	Brest, Belarus	Soligorsk Shakhner
32	Andrei Golikov (D)	Russia	Ottawa 67's	Ryazan, Russia	Yaroslavl Loko-Junior
35	Pavel Demin (C)	Russia	Niagara IceDogs	Moscow, Russia	Balashikha HC MVD
38	Adam Thilander (D)	Sweden	North Bay Battalion	Skövde, Sweden	Skelleftea AIK Jr. 18
41	Urho Vaakanainen (D)	Finland	Windsor Spitfires	Joensuu, Finland	Espoo Blues
44	Alexey Lipanov (C)	Russia	Barrie Colts	Moscow, Russia	Balashikha HC MVD
47	Filip Helt (LW)	Czech Republic	Sarnia Sting	Litvínov, Czech Republic	Litvinov Chemopetrol Jr. B
50	Cedric Schiemenz (C)	Germany	Kitchener Rangers	Berlin, Germany	EC Red Bull Salzburg U18
53	Linus Nyman (RW)	Finland	Kingston Frontenacs	Helsinki, Finland	Jokerit Helsinki Jr.
56	Janne Kuokkanen (C/LW)	Finland	London Knights	Oulu, Finland	Karpat Oulu Jr.
58	German Poddubnyi (C)	Russia	Erie Otters	Sarov, Russia	Philadelphia Jr. Flyers 16U

Preceded by 2014–15 OHL season	OHL seasons	Succeeded by 2016–17 OHL season
