= Daniel Bernhardt (ice hockey) =

Swedish professional ice hockey forward

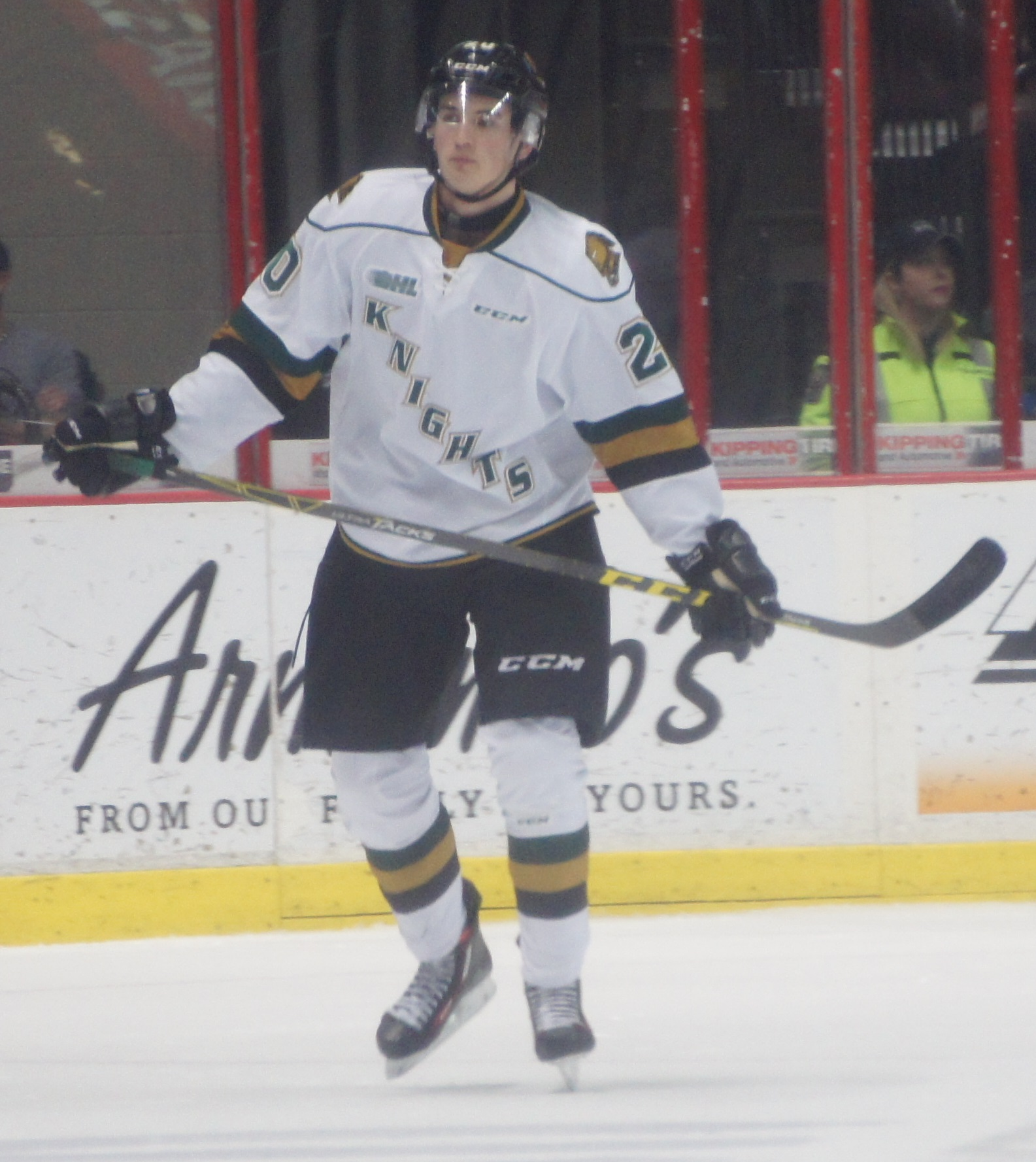
- Born: 11 April 1996 (age 30) Huddinge, Sweden
- Height: 6 ft 3 in (191 cm)
- Weight: 194 lb (88 kg; 13 st 12 lb)
- Position: Forward
- Shoots: Left
- team Former teams: Free Agent; Djurgårdens IF
- NHL draft: 119th overall, 2015; New York Rangers
- Playing career: 2014–present

Daniel Bernhardt (born 11 April 1996) is a Swedish professional ice hockey forward. He is currently an unrestricted free agent who most recently played with BIK Karlskoga of the HockeyAllsvenskan (Allsv). Bernhardt was selected by the New York Rangers in the 4th round (119th overall) of the 2015 NHL entry draft.

Bernhardt made his Swedish Hockey League debut playing with Djurgårdens IF during the 2014–15 SHL season. His younger brother, David remains playing in the SHL with the Växjö Lakers.

== Career statistics ==
			Regular season					Playoffs
Season	Team	League	GP	G	A	Pts	PIM	GP	G	A	Pts	PIM
2013–14	Djurgårdens IF	J20	11	0	0	0	2	1	0	0	0	0
2014–15	Djurgårdens IF	J20	44	26	35	61	22	7	2	2	4	0
2014–15	Djurgårdens IF	SHL	2	0	0	0	0	—	—	—	—	—
2015–16	Djurgårdens IF	J20	2	1	0	1	2	—	—	—	—	—
2015–16	Djurgårdens IF	SHL	10	1	0	1	0	—	—	—	—	—
2015–16	Almtuna IS	Allsv	13	1	3	4	4	—	—	—	—	—
2015–16	London Knights	OHL	29	3	8	11	0	14	2	1	3	0
2016–17	Djurgårdens IF	SHL	4	0	1	1	0	—	—	—	—	—
2016–17	VIK Västerås HK	Allsv	28	4	1	5	4	10	1	1	2	0
2017–18	BIK Karlskoga	Allsv	3	0	0	0	2	—	—	—	—	—
SHL totals			16	1	1	2	0	—	—	—	—	—
