= Victor Mete =

Canadian ice hockey player (born 1998)

- Born: June 7, 1998 (age 28) Woodbridge, Ontario, Canada
- Height: 5 ft 9 in (175 cm)
- Weight: 184 lb (83 kg; 13 st 2 lb)
- Position: Defence
- Shot: Left
- Played for: Montreal Canadiens; Ottawa Senators; Toronto Maple Leafs; Philadelphia Flyers
- NHL draft: 100th overall, 2016; Montreal Canadiens
- Playing career: 2017–2024

Victor Joseph Mete (born June 7, 1998) is a Canadian former professional ice hockey defenceman. He most recently played for the Lehigh Valley Phantoms of the American Hockey League (AHL) while under contract to the Philadelphia Flyers of the National Hockey League (NHL). He was selected in the fourth round, 100th overall, by the Montreal Canadiens in the 2016 NHL entry draft. Mete has also previously played for the Ottawa Senators and Toronto Maple Leafs.

== Playing career ==
=== Amateur ===
Mete was drafted in the first round, eighth overall by the Owen Sound Attack of the Ontario Hockey League (OHL) in the 2014 OHL draft, but refused to play in Owen Sound and was traded before making an appearance with the club to the London Knights in exchange for six draft picks (three second-round, two third-round picks and a conditional sixth-round pick). He would go on to play three seasons with then Knights, helping the team win the Memorial Cup in 2016.

=== Professional ===
Shortly after the Memorial Cup win, Mete was drafted by the Montreal Canadiens in the fourth round, 100th overall during the 2016 NHL entry draft. On March 27, 2017, Mete was signed to a three-year, entry-level contract with the Canadiens. Shortly after, leading up to the 2017–18 season, Mete impressed at Montreal training camp and made the opening night roster. He picked up his first point on October 17, registering an assist in a 5–2 defeat to the San Jose Sharks. On March 2, 2018, Mete left a game against the New York Islanders due to an injury, and a few days later it was announced that Mete suffered a finger fracture and was set to be out for six weeks.

Mete began the 2018–19 season with the Canadiens in the NHL. After struggling in his first 23 games of the season, Mete was sent to the Canadiens American Hockey League (AHL) affiliate, the Laval Rocket, to help his development. Mete was recalled to the NHL on December 17 after recording one goal and three assists in seven AHL games.

Mete made the Canadiens lineup out of training camp for the 2019–20 season. After going goalless to start the season, Mete broke his 127-game, franchise-record goalless streak in a 4–0 win over the Minnesota Wild. In the same game, rookie Nick Suzuki also scored his first career NHL goal, making the pair the first Canadiens players to score their first NHL goal in the same game since 2005. In 51 games with the Canadiens, Mete tallied 4 goals and 11 points from the blueline before suffering a season-ending broken foot against the Detroit Red Wings on February 18, 2020. On October 9, 2020, Mete signed a one-year contract extension with the Canadiens. In the following pandemic-delayed 2020–21 season, Mete was dressed in just 14 games, collecting 3 assists, before he was placed on waivers approaching the NHL trade deadline.

On April 12, 2021, Mete was claimed off waivers by the Ottawa Senators, Mete scored the only goal of his tenure with the Senators on April 28 in a 6–3 win over the Vancouver Canucks. He finished the season with 28 games played registering one goal and five points. On August 4, 2021, the Senators re-signed him to a one-year, $1.2 million contract. During the 2021–22 season, Mete played in 37 games, only registering 7 points. At the conclusion of the season, Mete was not tendered a qualifying offer by the Senators to retain his exclusive negotiating rights, thereby releasing him to unrestricted free agency.

On July 14, the day after free agency began, Mete signed a one-year, $750,000 contract with his hometown Toronto Maple Leafs. Though Mete played well in training camp, he was placed on waivers and assigned to begin the 2022–23 season with Toronto's AHL affiliate, the Toronto Marlies on October 9, 2022. He was recalled on October 16 and played in 11 games registering two points with the Maple Leafs before suffering a serious injury on December 6.

As an unrestricted free agent from the Maple Leafs after one season, Mete was signed to a one-year, two-way contract with his first American-based club, the Philadelphia Flyers, on July 5, 2023. He attended the Flyers 2023 training camp, but failed to make the team. He was placed on waivers and after going unclaimed, was assigned to Philadelphia's AHL affiliate, the Lehigh Valley Phantoms to start the 2023–24 season. He was recalled by the Flyers on October 25, but did not play with Philadelphia and was returned to Lehigh Valley on November 2. He was recalled again on November 5. He was sent back to Lehigh Valley on November 14.

== International play ==
Medal record

Representing Canada

Ice hockey

World Junior Championships
Gold medal – first place	2018 United States	

Ivan Hlinka Memorial Tournament
Gold medal – first place	2015 Břeclav/Bratislava	

On December 16, 2017, Mete was named to the 22-man roster representing Canada at the IIHF World U20 Championship. On December 23, 2017, he was named alternate captain. Team Canada ended up winning the gold medal at that tournament.

== Personal life ==
Mete is of Italian descent. In 2022, Mete's maternal grandfather, Vittorio Panza, was killed during the 2022 Vaughan shooting.

== Career statistics ==
=== Regular season and playoffs ===
			Regular season					Playoffs
Season	Team	League	GP	G	A	Pts	PIM	GP	G	A	Pts	PIM
2014–15	London Knights	OHL	58	7	16	23	14	10	1	7	8	2
2015–16	London Knights	OHL	68	8	30	38	18	18	4	7	11	0
2016–17	London Knights	OHL	50	15	29	44	14	14	1	6	7	4
2017–18	Montreal Canadiens	NHL	49	0	7	7	4	—	—	—	—	—
2018–19	Montreal Canadiens	NHL	71	0	13	13	6	—	—	—	—	—
2018–19	Laval Rocket	AHL	7	1	3	4	0	—	—	—	—	—
2019–20	Montreal Canadiens	NHL	51	4	7	11	20	10	0	2	2	2
2020–21	Montreal Canadiens	NHL	14	0	3	3	6	—	—	—	—	—
2020–21	Ottawa Senators	NHL	14	1	1	2	2	—	—	—	—	—
2021–22	Ottawa Senators	NHL	37	0	7	7	4	—	—	—	—	—
2022–23	Toronto Maple Leafs	NHL	11	0	2	2	4	—	—	—	—	—
2022–23	Toronto Marlies	AHL	6	0	0	0	14	—	—	—	—	—
2023–24	Lehigh Valley Phantoms	AHL	59	1	15	16	22	4	0	1	1	2
2023–24	Philadelphia Flyers	NHL	1	0	0	0	0	—	—	—	—	—
NHL totals			248	5	40	45	46	10	0	2	2	2

=== International ===
Year	Team	Event	Result	GP	G	A	Pts	PIM
2014	Canada Red	U17	6th	5	1	1	2	4
2015	Canada	IH18	1st place, gold medalist(s)	4	0	1	1	0
2018	Canada	WJC	1st place, gold medalist(s)	6	0	3	3	2
Junior totals				15	1	5	6	6

== Awards and honours ==
Award	Year
OHL
Second All-Rookie Team	2015
Robertson Cup Champion	2016
CHL
Memorial Cup champion	2016
