= Pavel Jenyš =

Czech professional ice hockey forward (born 1996)

- Born: 2 April 1996 (age 30) Brno, Czech Republic
- Height: 6 ft 2 in (188 cm)
- Weight: 192 lb (87 kg; 13 st 10 lb)
- Position: Forward
- Shoots: Left
- Chance liga team Former teams: HC RT Torax Poruba; HC Kometa Brno; Sudbury Wolves; Iowa Wild; Niagara IceDogs; Quad City Mallards; Rapid City Rush; Allen Americans; Ontario Reign; Manchester Monarchs; SK Horácká Slavia Třebíč; HC Dynamo Pardubice; HC Košice
- NHL draft: 199th overall, 2014; Minnesota Wild
- Playing career: 2013–present

Pavel Jenyš (born 2 April 1996) is a Czech professional ice hockey forward currently playing for HC RT Torax Poruba in the Chance liga.

Jenyš was selected by the Minnesota Wild in the seventh round (199th overall) at the 2014 NHL entry draft.

== Playing career ==
Jenyš made his Czech Extraliga debut playing with HC Kometa Brno debut during the 2013–14 season. After his selection by the Minnesota Wild in the 2014 NHL entry draft, Jenyš moved to North America and played a season of junior hockey with the Sudbury Wolves of the Ontario Hockey League (OHL).

On 5 May 2015, Jenyš was signed to a three-year, entry-level contract with the Wild. On 21 November 2018, Jenyš was traded to the Los Angeles Kings in exchange for Stepan Falkovsky.

With his entry-level contract completed and as an impending free agent from the Kings, Jenyš opted to return to the Czech Republic, agreeing to a one-year contract with original club, HC Kometa Brno, on 5 June 2019.

== Career statistics ==
=== Regular season and playoffs ===
			Regular season					Playoffs
Season	Team	League	GP	G	A	Pts	PIM	GP	G	A	Pts	PIM
2013–14	HC Kometa Brno	ELH	29	2	0	2	4	—	—	—	—	—
2014–15	Sudbury Wolves	OHL	63	15	30	45	45	—	—	—	—	—
2014–15	Iowa Wild	AHL	8	0	3	3	0	—	—	—	—	—
2015–16	Sudbury Wolves	OHL	24	4	8	12	16	—	—	—	—	—
2015–16	Niagara IceDogs	OHL	42	11	14	25	20	17	8	9	17	4
2016–17	Quad City Mallards	ECHL	46	12	4	16	8	1	0	0	0	0
2017–18	Rapid City Rush	ECHL	48	17	18	35	29	—	—	—	—	—
2017–18	Iowa Wild	AHL	9	1	0	1	2	—	—	—	—	—
2018–19	Allen Americans	ECHL	9	4	0	4	0	—	—	—	—	—
2018–19	Ontario Reign	AHL	1	0	0	0	0	—	—	—	—	—
2018–19	Manchester Monarchs	ECHL	24	10	14	24	2	10	3	6	9	0
AHL totals			18	1	3	4	2	—	—	—	—	—

=== International ===
Year	Team	Event	Result	GP	G	A	Pts	PIM
2013	Czech Republic	IH18	3rd place, bronze medalist(s)	4	2	1	3	0
Junior totals				4	2	1	3	0
