= Cam Dineen =

American ice hockey player (born 1998)

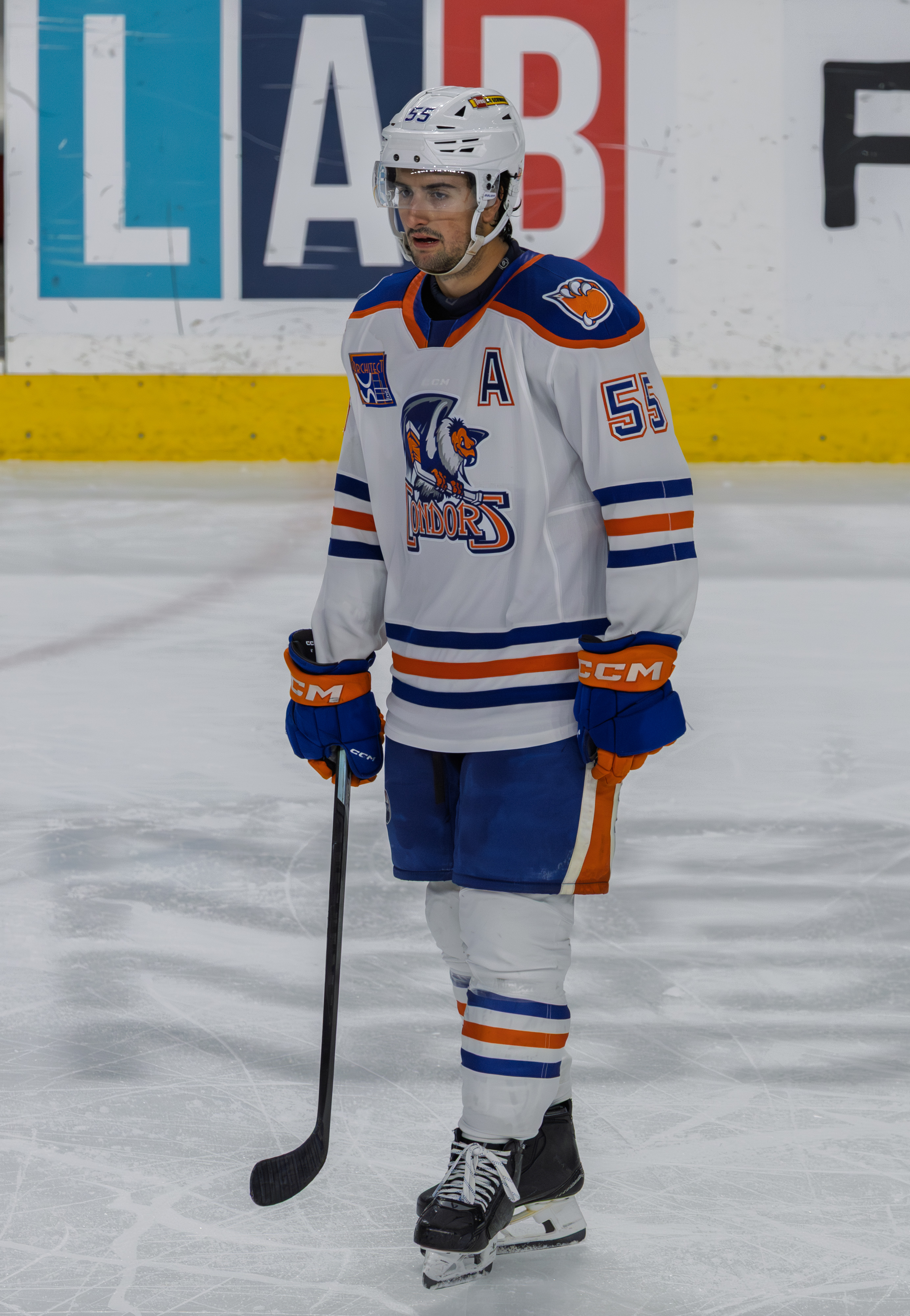
- Dineen with the Bakersfield Condors in April 2026
- Born: June 19, 1998 (age 28) Toms River, New Jersey, U.S.
- Height: 5 ft 11 in (180 cm)
- Weight: 188 lb (85 kg; 13 st 6 lb)
- Position: Defense
- Shoots: Left
- NHL team (P) Cur. team Former teams: Philadelphia Flyers; Lehigh Valley Phantoms (AHL); Arizona Coyotes; Edmonton Oilers
- NHL draft: 68th overall, 2016; Arizona Coyotes
- Playing career: 2018–present

Cameron Dineen (born June 19, 1998) is an American professional ice hockey defenseman for the Lehigh Valley Phantoms of the American Hockey League (AHL) while under contract to the Philadelphia Flyers of the National Hockey League (NHL). Dineen was drafted 68th overall by the Arizona Coyotes in the 2016 NHL entry draft and made his NHL debut on November 5, 2021, in a 3–1 loss to the Anaheim Ducks.

== Early life ==
Dineen was born on June 19, 1998, in Toms River, New Jersey to parents Melissa and Kevin. Although he is not related to longtime NHL player Kevin Dineen, he comes from a hockey playing family. His father played for North's Mariners while his brother competed with the Jersey Shore Whalers. His cousins also played minor hockey while his uncle played for Ocean County College and East Stroudsburg University.

Dineen began ice skating at the age of four with the learn-to-skate program while his father was a member of the Chicago Blackhawks’ program. Following youth hockey, Dineen began playing with the New Jersey Rockets U19 of the Independent Junior Hockey League and Eastern Hockey League. He played prep hockey at Toms River High School North.

== Playing career ==
=== Amateur ===
In his final year with the Rockets, Dineen recorded 11 goals and 30 assists for 41 points through 39 games. He was also the Tri-City Storm's first-round pick in the 2014 United States Hockey League (USHL) Draft, and went pointless in three games. As a result of his play with the Rockets, Dineen was named the EHL's Rookie of the Year for 2015 and committed to play collegiate ice hockey with Yale University. Following this, Dineen was signed to an education contract with the North Bay Battalion of the Ontario Hockey League (OHL) on June 11, 2015.

In his rookie season with the Battalion, Dineen recorded 13 goals and 46 assists for 59 points in 68 games. He began the 2015–16 season ranked 117th overall amongst North American skaters by the NHL Central Scouting Bureau but jumped into the top 40 after averaging nearly a point per game. As such, he was named to the 2015–16 OHL All-Rookie Team and named a finalist for the Emms Family Award as OHL Rookie of the Year. During the post-season, he also tallied eight assists in 11 games before being drafted in the third round, 68th overall, by the Arizona Coyotes in the 2016 NHL entry draft.

Upon returning to the Battalion, Dineen played in 29 games before suffering a season-ending MCL tear. On January 6, 2018, Dineen was traded to the Sarnia Sting in exchange for Braden Henderson, a second-round pick in 2019, fourth-round pick in 2019, fourth-round pick in 2020, second-round pick in 2021, sixth-round pick in 2022, and two conditional draft picks. He finished the season with the Sting, tallying 28 points in 26 games, and was named a finalist for Defenceman of the Year and Most Sportsmanlike Player of the Year.

=== Professional ===
On August 2, 2021, Dineen signed a one-year contract extension to remain with the Coyotes organization. He was recalled to the NHL on October 26 and made his NHL debut on November 5, 2021, in a 3–1 loss to the Anaheim Ducks. During his debut, he recorded three shots and one hit in 16:50 of ice time.

On March 2, 2023, the Coyotes traded Dineen along with Nick Bjugstad to the Edmonton Oilers in exchange for a third-round pick in 2023, and prospect Michael Kesselring.

Dineen spent the remainder of the 2022–2023 season as well as the entire 2023–2024 season with the Bakersfield Condors, AHL affiliate of the Oilers. On March 5, 2025, he was called up as an emergency recall due to injuries to Mattias Ekholm and John Klingberg and made his Oilers debut against the Montreal Canadiens. He was called up again on April 10, 2025.

On July 1, 2026, Dineen signed a two-year, two-way contract with the Philadelphia Flyers.

== Career statistics ==
=== Regular season and playoffs ===
			Regular season					Playoffs
Season	Team	League	GP	G	A	Pts	PIM	GP	G	A	Pts	PIM
2014–15	New Jersey Rockets	EHL	39	10	31	41	8	2	0	0	0	0
2014–15	Tri-City Storm	USHL	3	0	0	0	0	—	—	—	—	—
2015–16	North Bay Battalion	OHL	68	13	46	59	18	11	0	8	8	0
2016–17	North Bay Battalion	OHL	29	6	8	14	8	—	—	—	—	—
2017–18	North Bay Battalion	OHL	39	11	25	36	10	—	—	—	—	—
2017–18	Sarnia Sting	OHL	26	9	19	28	0	12	1	3	4	0
2018–19	Tucson Roadrunners	AHL	57	3	9	12	6	—	—	—	—	—
2019–20	Tucson Roadrunners	AHL	57	5	9	14	12	—	—	—	—	—
2020–21	Tucson Roadrunners	AHL	22	3	7	10	4	1	0	0	0	0
2021–22	Tucson Roadrunners	AHL	21	3	16	19	6	—	—	—	—	—
2021–22	Arizona Coyotes	NHL	34	0	7	7	4	—	—	—	—	—
2022–23	Tucson Roadrunners	AHL	50	4	31	35	14	—	—	—	—	—
2022–23	Bakersfield Condors	AHL	19	2	10	12	0	2	0	1	1	0
2023–24	Bakersfield Condors	AHL	58	5	20	25	18	2	0	0	0	10
2024–25	Bakersfield Condors	AHL	59	9	34	43	20	—	—	—	—	—
2024–25	Edmonton Oilers	NHL	4	0	0	0	0	—	—	—	—	—
2025–26	Bakersfield Condors	AHL	40	3	18	21	22	3	0	1	1	0
NHL totals			38	0	7	7	4	—	—	—	—	—

=== International ===
Year	Team	Event	Result	GP	G	A	Pts	PIM
2015	United States	IH18	5th	4	0	2	2	2
Junior totals				4	0	2	2	2

== Awards and honors ==
Award	Year
EHL
Rookie of the Year	2015
First All-Star Team	2015
OHL
First All-Rookie Team	2016
Third All-Star Team	2018
