= Tyler Parsons =

Canadian ice hockey player (born 1997)

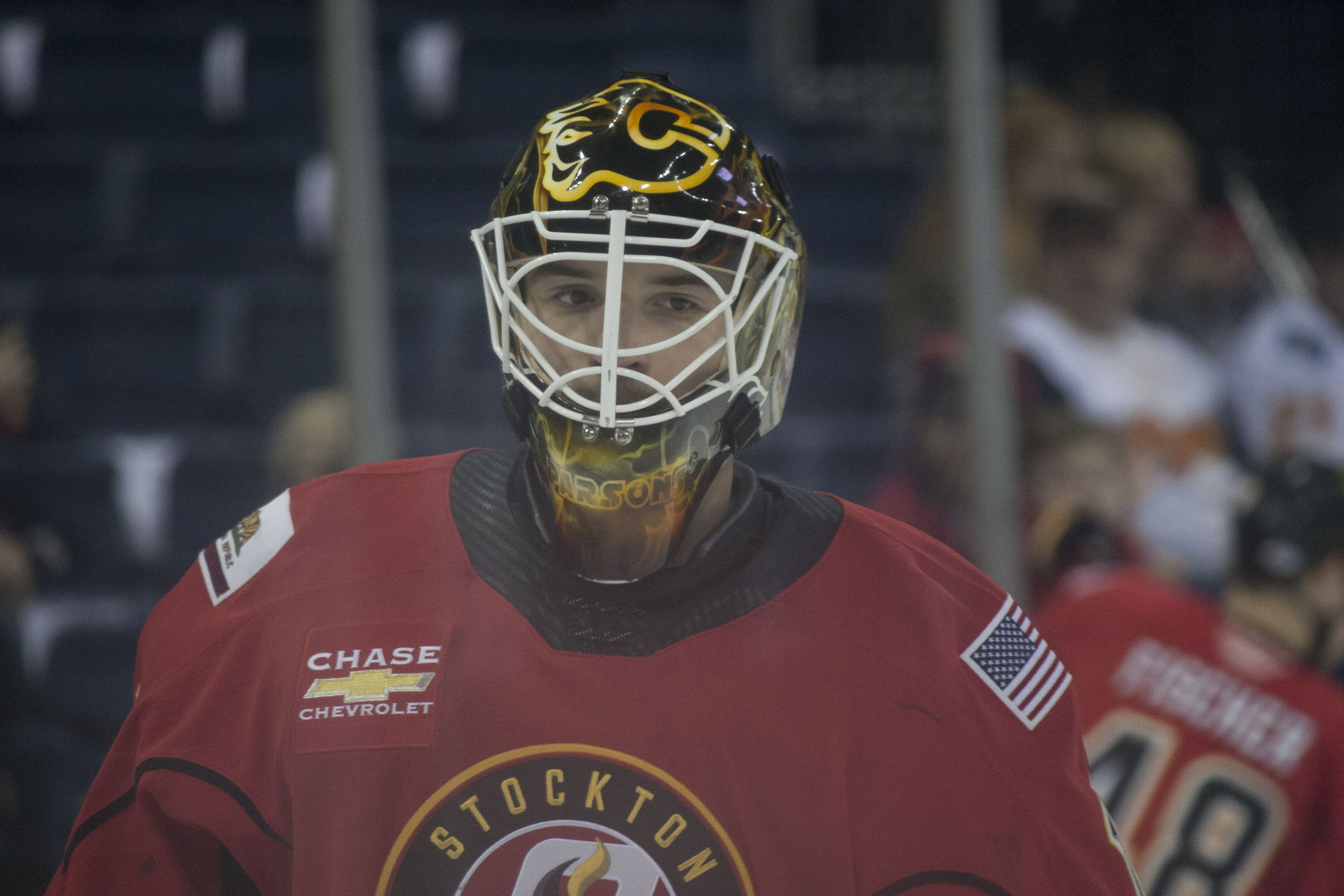
- Parsons with the Stockton Heat in 2019
- Born: September 18, 1997 (age 29) Chesterfield, Michigan, U.S.
- Height: 6 ft 1 in (185 cm)
- Weight: 185 lb (84 kg; 13 st 3 lb)
- Position: Goaltender
- Caught: Left
- Played for: Stockton Heat; Kansas City Mavericks
- NHL draft: 54th overall, 2016; Calgary Flames
- Playing career: 2017–2020

Tyler Parsons (born September 18, 1997) is an American former professional ice hockey goaltender. Parsons most recently played for the Stockton Heat in the American Hockey League (AHL) as a prospect to the Calgary Flames of the National Hockey League (NHL).

== Playing career ==
=== Junior ===
Parsons spent his junior career with the London Knights of the OHL, playing three seasons with the team, including winning seventeen straight games en route to winning the 2016 Memorial Cup. During the 2016-17 season, Parsons was one of the top goaltenders in the league; leading the league in save percentage for starting goaltenders.

=== Professional ===
After his impressive performance leading up to his Memorial Cup championship, Parsons was drafted by the Calgary Flames in the 2nd round of the 2016 NHL draft, 54th overall. Parsons signed his entry-level contract with the Flames on March 19, 2017. On October 13, 2017, Parsons made his professional debut for the Kansas City Mavericks of the ECHL, a 5–3 victory against the Tulsa Oilers. Parsons would spend most of his professional rookie season with the Mavericks, with the remainder played with the Flames top affiliate, the Stockton Heat of the AHL.

Despite being regarded as the Flames top goaltending prospect, Parsons would play the entirety of his career in the Flames minor league system, never being called up due to injury and struggles with anger management, anxiety, and depression.

== International play ==
Medal record

Representing United States

Ice hockey

World Junior Championships
Gold medal – first place	2017 Canada	

On December 24, 2016, Parsons was named to the final roster to represent the United States during the 2017 World Junior Ice Hockey Championships. Parsons would go on to shine in the tournament; not being credited with a loss, and winning the gold medal game in exciting fashion, beating host team Canada in the shootout.

== Career statistics ==
=== Regular season and playoffs ===
			Regular season									Playoffs
Season	Team	League	GP	W	L	OT	MIN	GA	SO	GAA	SV%	GP	W	L	MIN	GA	SO	GAA	SV%
2014–15	London Knights	OHL	33	15	10	2	1,147	97	0	3.53	.905	8	4	3	437	24	1	3.30	.917
2015–16	London Knights	OHL	49	37	9	3	2,835	110	4	2.33	.921	18	16	2	1086	39	1	2.15	.925
2016–17	London Knights	OHL	34	23	6	5	2,000	79	4	2.37	.925	14	7	7	870	39	1	2.69	.922
2017–18	Stockton Heat	AHL	7	1	3	0	301	22	0	4.39	.856	—	—	—	—	—	—	—	—
2017–18	Kansas City Mavericks	ECHL	28	12	12	2	1,576	83	1	3.16	.902	—	—	—	—	—	—	—	—
2018–19	Stockton Heat	AHL	20	9	9	2	1,087	67	0	3.70	.898	—	—	—	—	—	—	—	—
2019–20	Kansas City Mavericks	ECHL	25	11	9	2	1,327	67	1	3.03	.911	—	—	—	—	—	—	—	—
2020–21	Stockton Heat	AHL	1	0	1	0	60	5	0	5.00	.800	—	—	—	—	—	—	—	—

=== International ===
Year	Team	Event	Result	GP	W	L	T	MIN	GA	SO	GAA	SV%
2017	United States	WJC	1st place, gold medalist(s)	5	2	0	0	330	12	0	2.18	0.917
