= Cliff Pu =

Canadian ice hockey player (born 1998)

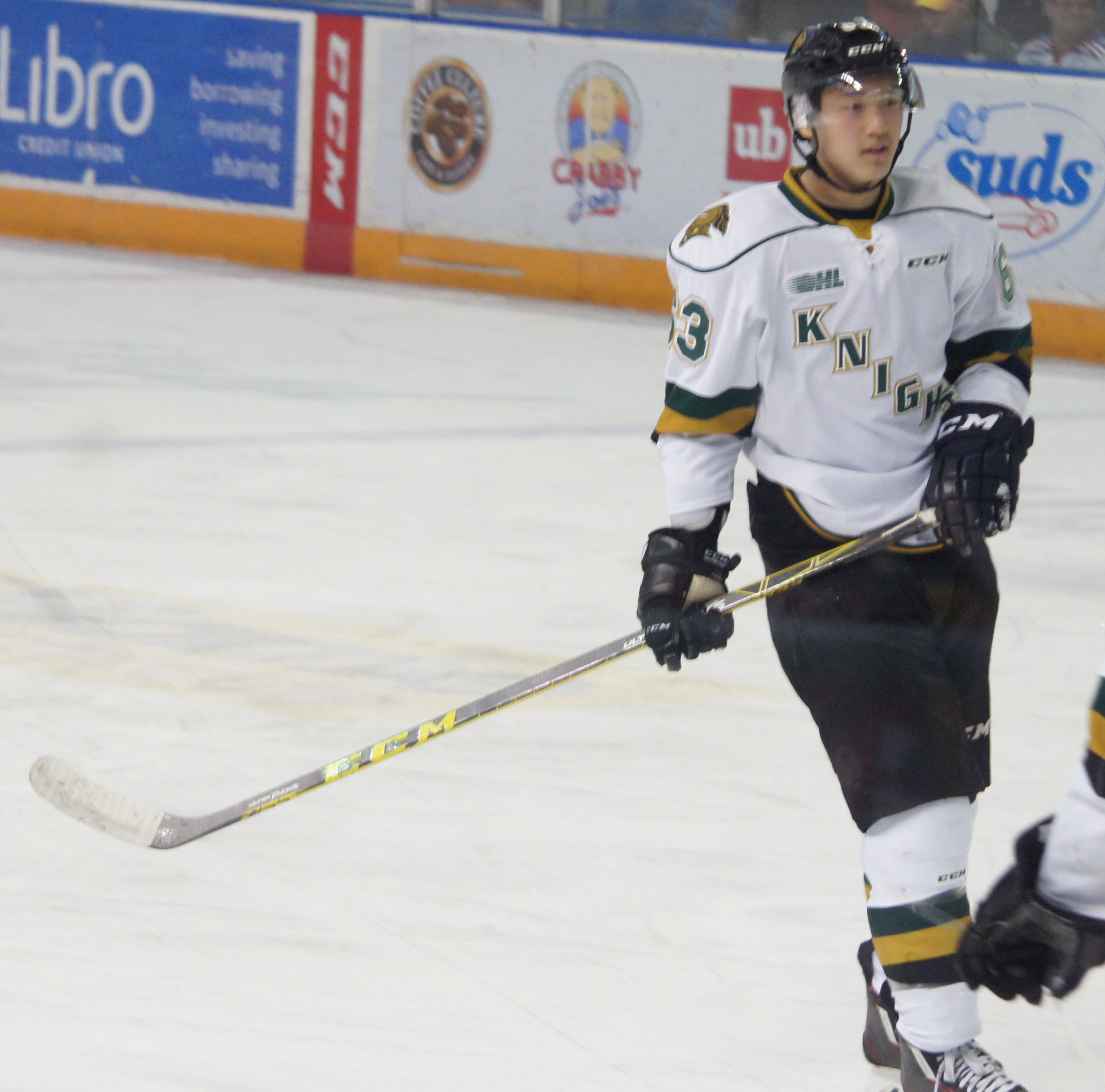
- Pu with the London Knights in 2016
- Born: June 3, 1998 (age 28) North York, Ontario, Canada
- Height: 6 ft 3 in (191 cm)
- Weight: 192 lb (87 kg; 13 st 10 lb)
- Position: Centre
- Shoots: Right
- EIHL team Former teams: Sheffield Steelers; Charlotte Checkers; Springfield Thunderbirds; Cleveland Monsters; Kunlun Red Star; Admiral Vladivostok; HK Dukla Michalovce; HC La Chaux-de-Fonds
- NHL draft: 69th overall, 2016; Buffalo Sabres
- Playing career: 2018–present

Clifford Pu (born June 3, 1998) is a Canadian professional ice hockey forward who most recently played for Sheffield Steelers of the Elite Ice Hockey League (EIHL). He was selected 69th overall in the 2016 NHL entry draft by the Buffalo Sabres.

== Playing career ==
=== Youth ===
Pu played at the AAA hockey level since the Atom age group. He was named an International Silverstick Atom AAA All Star in 2009. In his final year of minor ice hockey, he played for the Toronto Marlboros Minor Midget AAA team. He was seen as one of the top prospects in the 2014 OHL Priority Selection after finishing 4th on his team in points.

=== Junior ===
Pu was drafted in the first round, 16th overall, in the 2014 OHL Priority Selection by the Oshawa Generals. He appeared in 17 games with the Generals, scoring two goals and adding an assist. On January 1, 2015, Pu was traded to the London Knights along with Josh Sterk and three draft picks, in exchange for Michael McCarron and Dakota Mermis. In the 24 games he appeared in for the Knights following the trade, Pu scored four goals and added two assists.

In his first full season with the Knights, Pu recorded 12 goals and 19 assists. In the following season, he greatly improved on his totals, leading the Knights in regular season scoring. On January 3, 2018, the Knights traded Pu to the Kingston Frontenacs for Nathan Dunkley and draft picks.

=== Professional ===
In 2016, Pu became eligible for the 2016 NHL entry draft. He was the 83rd ranked North American skater by the NHL's Scouting Service. He was drafted in the third round, 69th overall, by the Buffalo Sabres. On October 23, 2017, Pu signed a three-year, entry-level contract with the Sabres.

Pu was traded to the Carolina Hurricanes on August 2, 2018, along with future draft picks (2019 second-round, and 2020 third-round and a sixth-round) in exchange for forward Jeff Skinner.

After attending the Hurricanes' 2018 training camp, Pu was assigned to begin the 2018–19 season, with Carolina's AHL affiliate, the Charlotte Checkers. He struggled to translate his offensive game to the professional level and was reassigned to the ECHL affiliate, the Florida Everblades, on February 9, 2019. After scoring at a point-per-game through five appearances with the Everblades, Pu was returned to the AHL. Having contributed with one goal and five assists for six points in 44 games with Charlotte, Pu was traded by the Hurricanes to the Florida Panthers in exchange for future considerations, which correlated with the Checkers' acquisition of Tomáš Jurčo, on February 25, 2019.

On October 8, 2020, Pu was traded for the third time during his entry-level contract by the Panthers to the Columbus Blue Jackets in exchange for Markus Nutivaara.

With his contract concluding with the Blue Jackets, Pu was not tendered a qualifying offer and became a free agent. On August 13, 2021, with limited opportunities in North America, he embarked on a European career, agreeing to a one-year contract with Austrian club, the Vienna Capitals of the ICE Hockey League.

On June 20, 2024, Slovak Extraliga team HK Dukla Michalovce announced that Pu had been signed to a one-year contract. After just 7 games with the team, Pu was released via mutual agreement on October 10th, 2024. On December 12, 2024, he signed with HC La Chaux-de-Fonds in the Swiss League until the end of the season.

On July 10, 2025, Pu signed a one-year contract with the Sheffield Steelers in the EIHL.

== Personal life ==
Pu was born in North York, Ontario and was raised in Richmond Hill, Ontario.

== Career statistics ==
=== Regular season and playoffs ===
			Regular season					Playoffs
Season	Team	League	GP	G	A	Pts	PIM	GP	G	A	Pts	PIM
2012–13	Toronto Marlboros	GTMMHL	33	23	24	47	10	16	4	13	17	4
2014–15	Oshawa Generals	OHL	17	2	1	3	2	—	—	—	—	—
2014–15	London Knights	OHL	24	2	4	6	2	5	0	0	0	0
2015–16	London Knights	OHL	63	12	19	31	24	18	8	5	13	6
2016–17	London Knights	OHL	63	35	51	86	36	14	2	5	7	8
2017–18	London Knights	OHL	36	16	29	45	22	—	—	—	—	—
2017–18	Kingston Frontenacs	OHL	29	13	26	39	6	15	4	13	17	6
2018–19	Charlotte Checkers	AHL	44	1	5	6	10	—	—	—	—	—
2018–19	Florida Everblades	ECHL	5	2	3	5	0	—	—	—	—	—
2018–19	Springfield Thunderbirds	AHL	9	1	1	2	0	—	—	—	—	—
2019–20	Springfield Thunderbirds	AHL	10	0	2	2	4	—	—	—	—	—
2019–20	Greenville Swamp Rabbits	ECHL	4	1	5	6	2	—	—	—	—	—
2020–21	Cleveland Monsters	AHL	16	3	7	10	6	—	—	—	—	—
2021–22	Kunlun Red Star	KHL	15	3	3	6	6	—	—	—	—	—
2022–23	Kunlun Red Star	KHL	41	11	9	20	34	—	—	—	—	—
2023–24	Kunlun Red Star	KHL	29	1	8	9	12	—	—	—	—	—
2023–24	Admiral Vladivostok	KHL	24	1	5	6	6	—	—	—	—	—
2024–25	HK Dukla Michalovce	Slovak	7	1	2	3	2	—	—	—	—	—
2024–25	HC La Chaux-de-Fonds	SL	13	3	9	12	8	1	0	0	0	0
AHL totals			79	5	15	20	20	—	—	—	—	—
KHL totals			109	16	25	41	58	—	—	—	—	—

=== International ===
Year	Team	Event	Result	GP	G	A	Pts	PIM
2014	Canada Black	U17	7th	5	1	0	1	2
Junior totals				5	1	0	1	2
