= Stepan Falkovsky =

Belarusian ice hockey player

- Born: 18 December 1996 (age 29) Minsk, Belarus
- Height: 6 ft 9 in (206 cm)
- Weight: 249 lb (113 kg; 17 st 11 lb)
- Position: Defence
- Shoots: Left
- KHL team Former teams: Lokomotiv Yaroslavl; Yunost Minsk; Dinamo Minsk; SKA Saint Petersburg; Ak Bars Kazan
- National team: Belarus
- NHL draft: 186th overall, 2016; Calgary Flames
- Playing career: 2013–present

Stepan Falkovsky (Belarusian: Сцяпан Мікалаевіч Фалькоўскі, romanized: Sciapan Mikałajevič Falkoŭski; born 18 December 1996) is a Belarusian professional ice hockey defenceman playing for Lokomotiv Yaroslavl of the Kontinental Hockey League (KHL). He was selected by the Calgary Flames in the seventh round (186th overall) at the 2016 NHL entry draft.

== Playing career ==
Falkovsky played in his native Belarus, as a youth with Yunost Minsk. He made his professional debut as a 16-year-old in the Vysshaya Liga in 2013. In moving to North America to continue his development at a higher level, Falkovsky played major junior with the Ottawa 67's of the Ontario Hockey League (OHL).

Falkovsky was selected in the seventh round (186th overall) by the Calgary Flames in the 2016 NHL entry draft. He was signed to an AHL/ECHL contract with the Flames' affiliate, the Stockton Heat on 5 October 2016. Pushed down the depth chart, Falkovsky was rooted to the ECHL for the duration of the 2016–17 season, recording 21 goals in 54 games with the Adirondack Thunder.

As an unsigned prospect of the Flames, on 1 July 2017, Falkovsky signed as a free agent to a three-year, entry-level contract with the Los Angeles Kings. On 21 November 2018, Falkovsky was traded by the Kings to the Minnesota Wild in exchange for Pavel Jenyš. He played 5 games with the Iowa Wild in the AHL, before he was reassigned to the ECHL, moving to the Wild's affiliate, the Allen Americans. On March 8, 2019, Falkovsky left the Americans and was returned with the permission of the Minnesota Wild to former ECHL club, the Monarchs, at the trade deadline.

At the conclusion of his entry-level contract with the Wild, Falkovsky left North America to return to Belarus, securing an initial trial contract with HC Dinamo Minsk of the KHL on 4 August 2020. In the 2020–21 season, Falkovsky was signed to a one-year contract, breaking out with 8 goals and 20 points through 37 regular season games.

On 16 June 2021, Falkovsky was traded by Dinamo Minsk to SKA Saint Petersburg, in exchange for Lukas Bengtsson. He was signed to a two-year contract extension to remain with SKA through 2023.

After two seasons with Ak Bars Kazan, Falkovsky continued his career in the KHL by signing a one-year contract with Lokomotiv Yaroslavl on August 10, 2026.

== Career statistics ==
=== Regular season and playoffs ===
			Regular season					Playoffs
Season	Team	League	GP	G	A	Pts	PIM	GP	G	A	Pts	PIM
2013–14	MHK Yunost Minsk	MHL	33	0	3	3	18	—	—	—	—	—
2013–14	Yunior Minsk	Bel.1	13	3	3	6	18	17	4	3	7	22
2014–15	Yunost Minsk	BXL	1	0	0	0	0	—	—	—	—	—
2014–15	MHK Yunost Minsk	MHL	22	4	7	11	2	5	0	1	1	8
2014–15	Yunior Minsk	Bel.1	9	4	4	8	14	—	—	—	—	—
2015–16	Ottawa 67's	OHL	58	9	23	32	35	5	1	2	3	4
2016–17	Adirondack Thunder	ECHL	54	21	11	32	37	4	0	2	2	0
2017–18	Ontario Reign	AHL	44	3	4	7	28	—	—	—	—	—
2018–19	Manchester Monarchs	ECHL	27	4	8	12	32	11	0	3	3	17
2018–19	Iowa Wild	AHL	5	0	0	0	2	—	—	—	—	—
2018–19	Allen Americans	ECHL	12	1	3	4	2	—	—	—	—	—
2019–20	Allen Americans	ECHL	46	15	26	41	32	—	—	—	—	—
2020–21	Dinamo Minsk	KHL	37	8	12	20	16	5	0	0	0	4
2021–22	SKA Saint Petersburg	KHL	29	0	8	8	8	16	3	1	4	6
2022–23	SKA Saint Petersburg	KHL	51	8	13	21	14	16	2	3	5	6
2023–24	SKA Saint Petersburg	KHL	39	4	7	11	12	10	1	1	2	2
2024–25	SKA Saint Petersburg	KHL	29	2	5	7	6	—	—	—	—	—
2024–25	Ak Bars Kazan	KHL	29	3	7	10	10	13	2	3	5	4
2025–26	Ak Bars Kazan	KHL	52	2	11	13	12	20	0	2	2	2
KHL totals			266	27	63	90	78	80	8	10	18	24

=== International ===
Year	Team	Event	Result	GP	G	A	Pts	PIM
2014	Belarus	WJC18-D1	14th	5	2	3	5	6
2015	Belarus	WJC-D1	11th	5	0	0	0	0
2016	Belarus	WJC	10th	6	1	1	2	0
2018	Belarus	WC	15th	7	0	1	1	8
2021	Belarus	WC	15th	7	0	1	1	0
Junior totals				16	3	4	7	6
Senior totals				14	0	2	2	8
