= Blake Speers =

Canadian ice hockey player (born 1997)

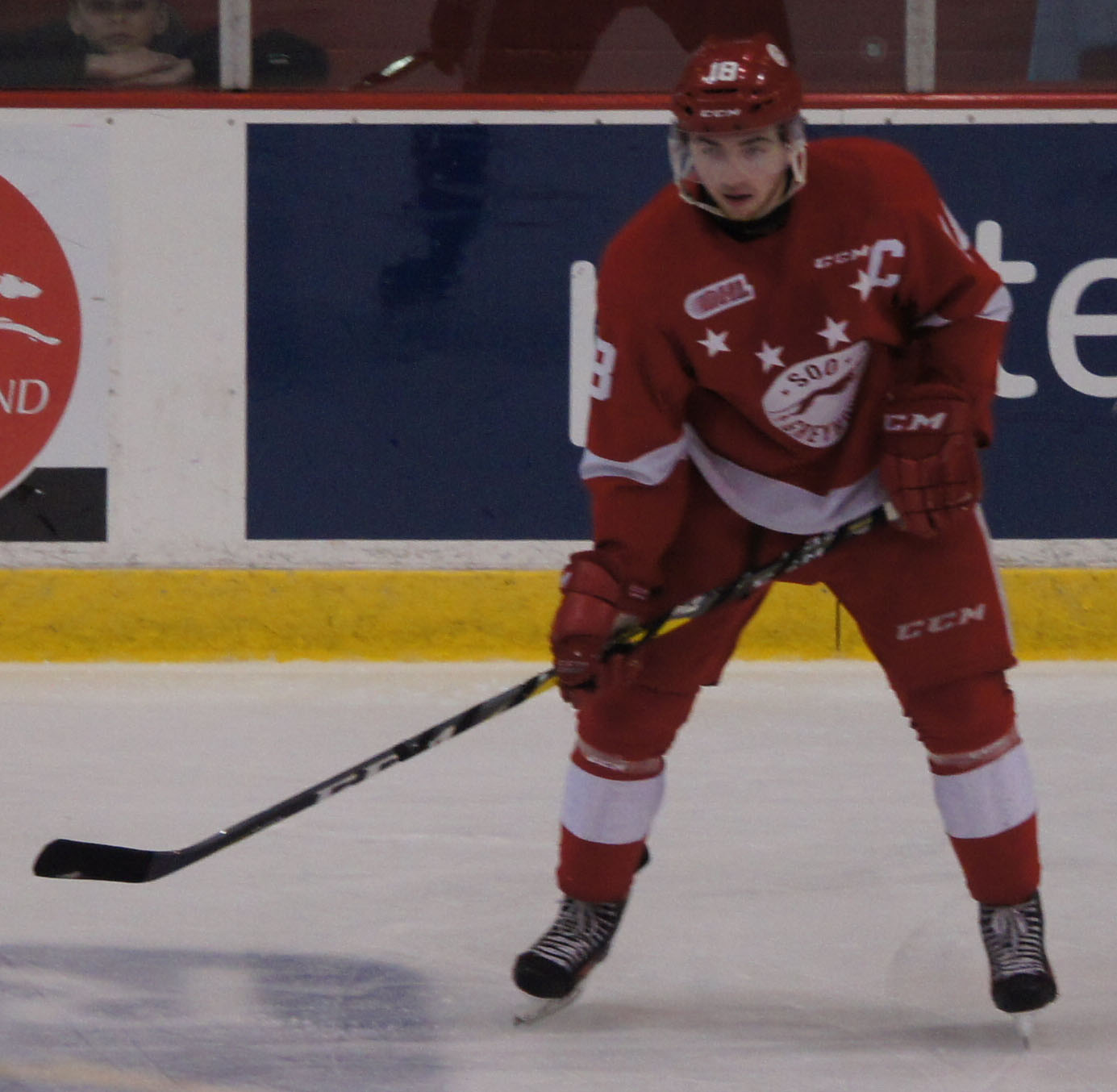
- Speers with the Sault Ste. Marie Greyhounds in 2016
- Born: January 2, 1997 (age 29) Sault Ste. Marie, Ontario, Canada
- Height: 5 ft 11 in (180 cm)
- Weight: 185 lb (84 kg; 13 st 3 lb)
- Position: Centre
- Shoots: Right
- team Former teams: Free agent New Jersey Devils; Arizona Coyotes; Albany Devils; Binghamton Devils; Tucson Roadrunners; Västerås IK
- NHL draft: 67th overall, 2015; New Jersey Devils
- Playing career: 2016–present

Blake Speers (born January 2, 1997) is a Canadian professional ice hockey centre. Speers was most recently with the Belfast Giants in the Elite Ice Hockey League (EIHL), and has formerly played in the National Hockey League (NHL) with the New Jersey Devils and the Arizona Coyotes.

== Playing career ==
Speers began his major junior career playing with the Sault Ste. Marie Greyhounds in the Ontario Hockey League before he was drafted in the 3rd round, 67th overall, by the New Jersey Devils in the 2015 NHL entry draft. On September 21, 2016, Speers signed a three-year entry-level contract with the Devils. On October 11, 2016, it was announced that Speers had made the Devils opening night roster for the 2016–17 season. He made his NHL debut on October 13, 2016 in a 2–1 overtime defeat against the Florida Panthers. After three scoreless games with the Devils, Speers was returned for his final junior eligible season with the Greyhounds on October 24, 2016.

On December 16, 2019, Speers was traded to the Arizona Coyotes as a part of a trade that sent Taylor Hall to the Devils. After recording 4 goals and 9 points in 32 games with their American Hockey League (AHL) affiliate, the Tucson Roadrunners, in addition to one assist in 10 AHL games before the trade, Speers signed a one-year, two-way contract with the Coyotes in August 2020.

As a free agent from the Coyotes following the 2021–22 season, Speers left North America to pursue a European career in agreeing to a one-year deal with Swedish second tier club, Västerås IK of the HockeyAllsvenskan, on August 1, 2022.

In February 2024, Speers signed with Elite Ice Hockey League (EIHL) side Belfast Giants for the remainder of the season.

== Career statistics ==
=== Regular season and playoffs ===
			Regular season					Playoffs
Season	Team	League	GP	G	A	Pts	PIM	GP	G	A	Pts	PIM
2013–14	Sault Ste. Marie Greyhounds	OHL	62	19	21	40	12	9	0	3	3	0
2014–15	Sault Ste. Marie Greyhounds	OHL	57	24	43	67	12	14	3	6	9	4
2015–16	Sault Ste. Marie Greyhounds	OHL	68	26	48	74	42	12	6	4	10	8
2016–17	New Jersey Devils	NHL	3	0	0	0	0	—	—	—	—	—
2016–17	Sault Ste. Marie Greyhounds	OHL	30	15	19	34	16	11	1	7	8	12
2016–17	Albany Devils	AHL	—	—	—	—	—	2	0	0	0	2
2017–18	Binghamton Devils	AHL	62	12	7	19	26	—	—	—	—	—
2018–19	Binghamton Devils	AHL	43	3	5	8	24	—	—	—	—	—
2019–20	Binghamton Devils	AHL	10	0	1	1	4	—	—	—	—	—
2019–20	Tucson Roadrunners	AHL	32	4	5	9	20	—	—	—	—	—
2020–21	Tucson Roadrunners	AHL	4	0	0	0	2	—	—	—	—	—
2021–22	Tucson Roadrunners	AHL	52	2	3	5	23	—	—	—	—	—
2021–22	Arizona Coyotes	NHL	2	0	0	0	2	—	—	—	—	—
2022–23	Västerås IK	Allsv.	38	4	10	14	19	7	0	2	2	6
2023–24	Belfast Giants	EIHL	15	4	7	11	6	4	2	0	2	0
NHL totals			5	0	0	0	2	—	—	—	—	—

=== International ===
Year	Team	Event	Result	GP	G	A	Pts	PIM
2014	Canada Ontario	U17	5th	5	1	3	4	6
2017	Canada	WJC	2nd place, silver medalist(s)	7	1	2	3	2
Junior totals				12	2	5	7	8
