= Justin Scott (ice hockey) =

Canadian ice hockey player (born 1995)

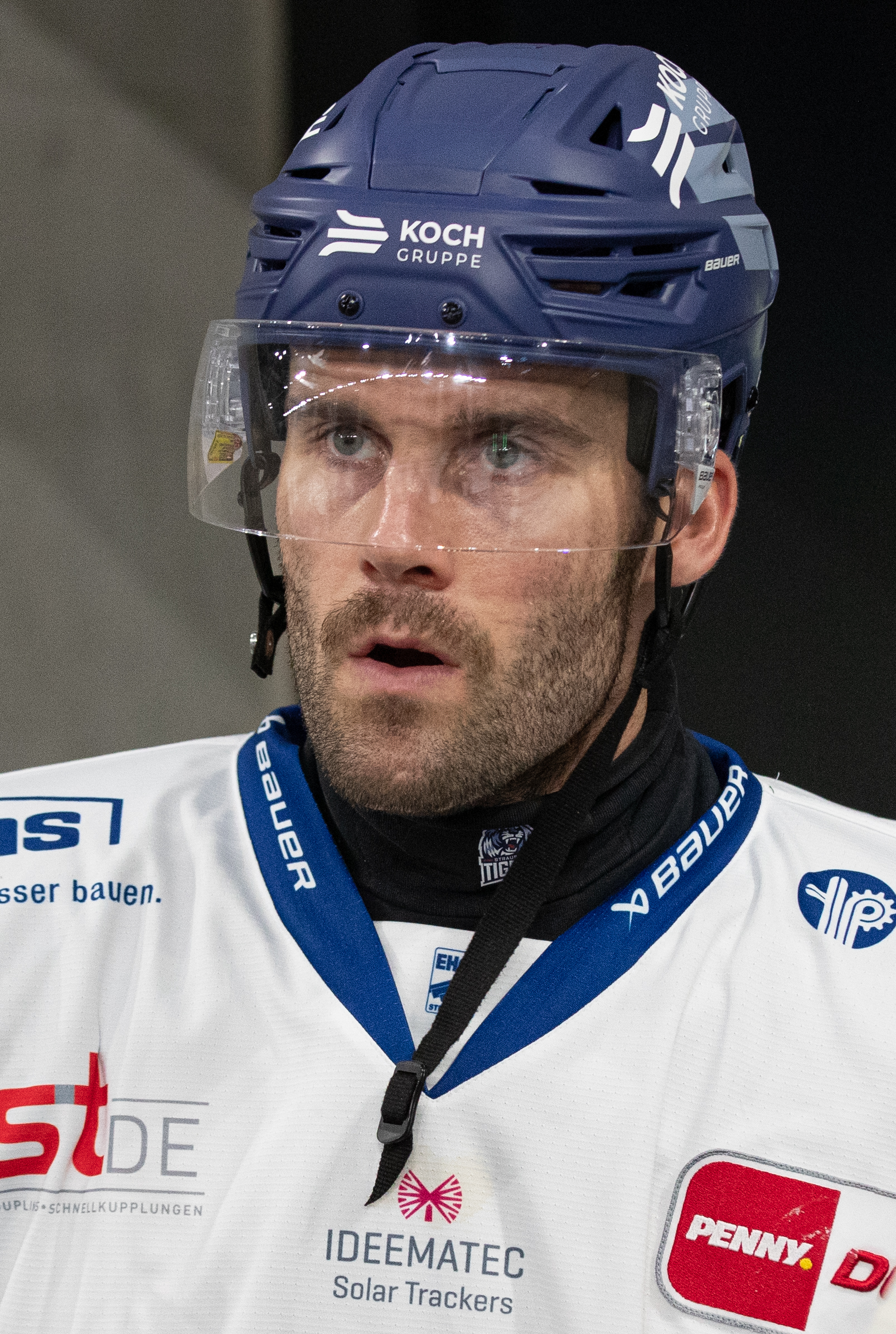
- Scott playing for the Straubing Tigers in 2025
- Born: 13 August 1995 (age 30) Burlington, Ontario, Canada
- Height: 6 ft 1 in (185 cm)
- Weight: 194 lb (88 kg; 13 st 12 lb)
- Position: Centre
- Shoots: Left
- DEL team Former teams: Straubing Tigers; Cleveland Monsters; Colorado Eagles
- NHL draft: Undrafted
- Playing career: 2016–present

Justin Scott (born 13 August 1995) is a Canadian professional ice hockey forward for the Straubing Tigers in the Deutsche Eishockey Liga (DEL). He previously played for the Cleveland Monsters and Colorado Eagles in the American Hockey League (AHL).

== Playing career ==
=== Junior ===
After playing in the Ontario Junior Hockey League (OJHL), Scott was drafted 80th overall by the Barrie Colts in the 2011 OHL Priority Selection.

Scott made his OHL debut on 20 September 2012 in a 6–4 win against Ottawa 67's. On 22 November 2012, he scored his first OHL point with an assist in a 3–2 loss against the Brampton Battalion. On 29 November 2012, he made his first OHL goal in a 4–2 win against the Windsor Spitfires; overall, he played 55 games with four goals and five assists in his rookie OHL season. In his sophomore season, he appeared in 61 games with seven goals and 13 assists. He improved on his numbers in the 2014–15 OHL season, with 68 games played with 30 goals and 23 assists.

Prior to his final season, Scott was selected as an alternate captain of the Colts, playing 67 games with 28 goals and 37 assists and leading the Colts to the OHL Eastern Conference Finals.

=== Professional ===
After going undrafted in the NHL entry draft, the Columbus Blue Jackets signed Scott to a three-year entry-level contract on 15 April 2016. On 14 October 2016, he made his professional debut for the Blue Jackets' AHL affiliate, the Cleveland Monsters, in a 2–1 win against the Rockford IceHogs. The next day, he scored his first AHL point with an assist in a 3–1 win against the IceHogs. On 28 October 2016, he scored his first professional goal in a 4–1 loss against the San Antonio Rampage. On 25 November 2016, after Matt Calvert was placed on injured reserve, Scott was recalled to the Blue Jackets, however, he did not appear in a National Hockey League (NHL) game and was reassigned to the Monsters two days later. In his rookie AHL season, he appeared in 58 games with 13 goals and ten assists. In his sophomore AHL season, he appeared in 73 games with six goals and 12 assists. In the 2018–19 AHL season, he appeared in 67 games with 13 goals and 11 assists, en route to an Eastern Conference final appearance in the 2019 Calder Cup playoffs.

On 10 July 2019, the Blue Jackets re-signed Scott to a one-year two-way contract. On 1 January 2020, Scott was recalled to the Blue Jackets. However, he did not appear in an NHL game and was reassigned to the Monsters two days later, playing 44 games with six goals and nine assists in the shortened season.

After the 2019–20 AHL season, Scott was released by the Blue Jackets. The Cleveland Monsters signed Scott to a one-year AHL contract on 12 October 2020 and was selected as an alternate captain. He played 18 games with two goals and five assists in the 2020–21 AHL season before having a season-ending shoulder injury.

On 23 June 2021, the Monsters re-signed Scott to an AHL contract. On 24 October 2021, in a 3–2 shootout loss to the Toronto Marlies, he appeared in his 265th career game for the Monsters, passing Cameron Gaunce for the most games played in franchise history. Scott left the Monsters at the conclusion of his sixth season with the club, having played in 336 regular season games.

On 12 July, 2022, the Colorado Eagles, the AHL affiliate for the Colorado Avalanche, announced they signed Scott to a one-year AHL contract for the 2022–23 season. In a depth forward, checking line role, Scott made 53 regular season appearances with the Eagles, posting 4 goals and 11 points. He featured in 2 post-season games as the Eagles reached the Division Semi-finals.

As a free agent from the Eagles, Scott left North America in the off-season to sign a one-year contract with German club, Straubing Tigers of the DEL, on July 15, 2023.

== Career statistics ==
			Regular season					Playoffs
Season	Team	League	GP	G	A	Pts	PIM	GP	G	A	Pts	PIM
2011–12	Burlington Cougars	OJHL	47	14	21	35	22	6	1	2	3	7
2012–13	Barrie Colts	OHL	55	4	5	9	24	7	0	0	0	0
2013–14	Barrie Colts	OHL	61	7	13	20	29	11	2	1	3	4
2014–15	Barrie Colts	OHL	68	30	23	53	39	9	1	6	7	10
2015–16	Barrie Colts	OHL	67	28	37	65	60	15	17	3	20	8
2016–17	Cleveland Monsters	AHL	58	13	10	23	55	—	—	—	—	—
2017–18	Cleveland Monsters	AHL	73	6	12	18	73	—	—	—	—	—
2018–19	Cleveland Monsters	AHL	67	13	11	24	61	8	2	1	3	0
2019–20	Cleveland Monsters	AHL	44	6	9	15	50	—	—	—	—	—
2020–21	Cleveland Monsters	AHL	18	2	5	7	35	—	—	—	—	—
2021–22	Cleveland Monsters	AHL	76	16	18	34	89	—	—	—	—	—
2022–23	Colorado Eagles	AHL	53	4	7	11	71	2	0	0	0	0
2023–24	Straubing Tigers	DEL	52	14	25	39	53	12	1	5	6	9
2024–25	Straubing Tigers	DEL	52	13	12	25	23	6	1	0	1	2
AHL totals			389	60	72	132	434	10	2	1	3	0
