= Roy Radke =

American ice hockey player

- Born: December 10, 1996 (age 29) Chicago, Illinois, USA
- Height: 6 ft 3 in (191 cm)
- Weight: 205 lb (93 kg; 14 st 9 lb)
- Position: Right wing
- Shot: Right
- Played for: SaiPa
- NHL draft: 164th overall, 2015; Chicago Blackhawks
- Playing career: 2017–2019

Roy Radke (born December 10, 1996) is an American former professional ice hockey winger who last played for SaiPa in the Finnish top tier league Liiga. He was drafted 164th overall by the Chicago Blackhawks in the 2013 NHL entry draft.

== Early life ==
Although Radke grew up in Logan Square, Chicago, his family moved to St. Charles while he was young. He stayed in St. Charles and was educated at Lincoln Elementary School until the fourth grade when his family moved to Geneva. Radke attended Geneva Middle School North before playing prep hockey in Indiana at Culver Military Academy. Radke later transferred to Shattuck St. Mary's in Minnesota where he played prep school hockey with the Shattuck St. Mary's Midget Prep.

== Playing career ==
=== Major junior ===
Radke was drafted by the Barrie Colts in the 2012 Ontario Hockey League Draft and by the Indiana Ice in the 2013 USHL Draft. After the Ice temporarily withdrew from the USHL before the 2014–15 season, Radke's playing rights were sent to the Dubuque Fighting Saints. On August 12, 2014, Radke committed to play in the Ontario Hockey League (OHL) with the Colts after concluding the 2013–14 season at Shattuck St. Mary's with a National Championship title.

Leading up to the 2015 NHL entry draft, Radke was ranked 104th for North American skaters by the NHL Central Scouting Bureau. He was eventually drafted 164th overall by the Chicago Blackhawks. Without a contract from the Blackhawks, Radke returned for one more season of major junior hockey before signing an amateur tryout agreement (ATO) with the Blackhawks American Hockey League affiliate, the Rockford IceHogs. However, a few days after signing his ATO, Radke underwent season ending surgery, cutting his final OHL season short.

=== Professional ===
Although he was given the option to join the IceHogs in the AHL after his rehab, on August 21, 2017, Radke left North America to play with SaiPa in the Finnish Liiga on a tryout contract. His tryout was extended in early October, and he eventually signed a one-year contract with the team in November. His contract was extended to the 2018–19 season on March 10, 2018.

Early on in the 2018–19 season, Radke suffered a head injury and was out for the remainder of the season. On April 3, 2019, the team announced Radke would be healthy for the following season. However, he was unable to be medically cleared to play and officially retired.

== Career statistics ==
			Regular season					Playoffs
Season	Team	League	GP	G	A	Pts	PIM	GP	G	A	Pts	PIM
2013–14	Shattuck-Saint Mary's	USHS	49	19	21	40	46	—	—	—	—	—
2014–15	Barrie Colts	OHL	64	9	9	18	29	9	4	0	4	2
2015–16	Barrie Colts	OHL	66	19	20	39	43	15	0	0	0	0
2016–17	Barrie Colts	OHL	45	23	13	36	30	—	—	—	—	—
2017–18	SaiPa	Liiga	46	7	5	12	34	7	0	0	0	4
2018–19	SaiPa	Liiga	1	0	1	0	0	—	—	—	—	—
Liiga totals			47	7	6	13	34	7	0	0	0	4
