= Jordan Maletta =

Canadian ice hockey player (born 1995)

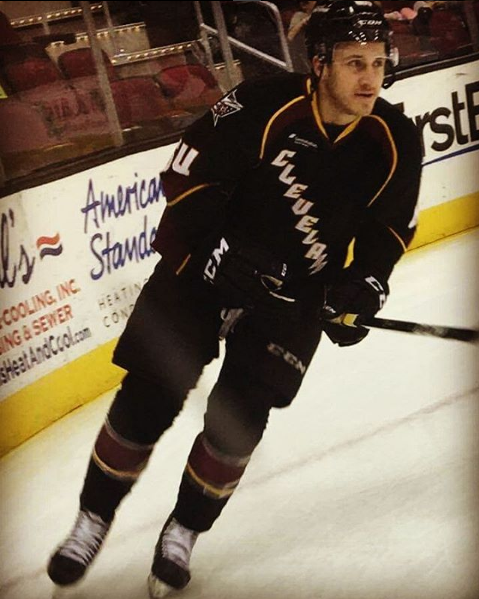
- Jordan Maletta playing for the Cleveland Monsters in 2017
- Born: April 30, 1995 (age 31) St. Catharines, Ontario, Canada
- Height: 6 ft 3 in (191 cm)
- Weight: 215 lb (98 kg; 15 st 5 lb)
- Position: Centre
- Shot: Right
- Played for: Cleveland Monsters; Tucson Roadrunners
- NHL draft: Undrafted
- Playing career: 2016–2018

Jordan Maletta (born April 30, 1995) is a Canadian former professional ice hockey forward. Maletta was signed as a free agent by the Columbus Blue Jackets on March 26, 2016. Prior to being signed by the Blue Jackets, he played junior ice hockey for the Windsor Spitfires and the Niagara Ice Dogs of the Ontario Hockey League.

== Playing career ==
=== Junior ===
In 2011, Jordan Maletta was the first-round pick for the Windsor Spitfires, and thirteenth overall pick, in the OHL Priority Selection. Maletta played for Windsor throughout the 2011–12 season, playing in a total of 57 games with 5 goals scored, 15 assists, and 59 penalty minutes. He started the 2012–13 season with Windsor, but was traded to the Niagara IceDogs on January 4, 2013. Maletta played for the IceDogs for the remainder of the 2012–13 season and throughout the subsequent three seasons. In his final season with the IceDogs, Maletta was named Niagara's Overage Player of the Year and was the team's nominee for the Red Tilson Trophy as the Most Outstanding Player of the Year after amassing a career high 34 goals. He served as assistant captain in his final two seasons in Niagara. Throughout his stint in the OHL, Maletta scored a total of 82 goals with 109 assists and 278 penalty minutes.

=== Professional ===
On March 21, 2016, Jordan Maletta was signed by the Columbus Blue Jackets as a free agent prospect to a three-year entry-level contract. He was assigned to the Blue Jackets AHL affiliate Cleveland Monsters on September 30, 2016, and played with the Monsters throughout the 2016–17 season. Maletta competed in every game in the season for the Monsters finishing with 23 points in 76 games and 2nd on the team in fights.

In the 2017–18 season, Maletta battled through a hand injury to make it back to the lineup, posting 4 assists in 28 games before he was dealt by the Blue Jackets to the Arizona Coyotes in exchange for Ryan Kujawinski on February 26, 2018. Maletta was dispatched to Arizona's affiliate, the Tucson Roadrunners and made just 1 appearance in end the campaign.

On July 12, 2018, Maletta was part of a multi-player trade that saw his rights go to the Chicago Blackhawks along with Marcus Krüger, Andrew Campbell, prospect MacKenzie Entwistle, and a fifth-round pick in 2019 in exchange for the contract of Marian Hossa, Vinnie Hinostroza, Jordan Oesterle, and a third-round pick in 2019. With Maletta not medically cleared to play in the following 2018–19 season, on October 4, 2018, he was placed on unconditional waivers and mutually terminated from his contract with the Blackhawks to end his professional career.

== Career statistics ==
=== Regular season and playoffs ===
			Regular season					Playoffs
Season	Team	League	GP	G	A	Pts	PIM	GP	G	A	Pts	PIM
2011–12	Windsor Spitfires	OHL	57	5	15	20	59	4	1	1	2	6
2012–13	Windsor Spitfires	OHL	36	4	8	12	38	—	—	—	—	—
2012–13	Niagara IceDogs	OHL	26	3	5	8	27	5	1	0	1	0
2013–14	Niagara IceDogs	OHL	29	12	28	40	58	7	2	1	3	4
2014–15	Niagara IceDogs	OHL	68	24	28	52	41	11	6	3	9	2
2015–16	Niagara IceDogs	OHL	68	34	25	59	55	17	2	9	11	15
2016–17	Cleveland Monsters	AHL	76	12	11	23	69	—	—	—	—	—
2017–18	Cleveland Monsters	AHL	28	0	4	4	32	—	—	—	—	—
2017–18	Tucson Roadrunners	AHL	1	0	0	0	0	—	—	—	—	—
AHL totals			105	12	15	27	101	—	—	—	—	—

=== International ===
Year	Team	Event	Result	GP	G	A	Pts	PIM
2012	Canada Ontario	U17	3rd place, bronze medalist(s)	2	0	0	0	0
Junior totals				2	0	0	0	0
