= 2014–15 OHL season =

- League: Ontario Hockey League
- Sport: Hockey
- Duration: Preseason; August – September 2014; Regular season September 24, 2014 – March 22, 2015; Playoffs; March 26, 2015 – May 15, 2015
- Teams: 20
- TV partner(s): Rogers TV, TVCogeco, Shaw TV

Draft
- Top draft pick: Jakob Chychrun
- Picked by: Sarnia Sting

Regular season
- Hamilton Spectator Trophy: Sault Ste. Marie Greyhounds (4)
- Season MVP: Connor McDavid (Erie Otters)
- Top scorer: Dylan Strome (Erie Otters)

Playoffs
- Playoffs MVP: Connor McDavid (Otters)
- Finals champions: Oshawa Generals (13)
- Runners-up: Erie Otters

OHL seasons
- 2013–14 2015–16

2014–15 CHL season
- League: Canadian Hockey League
- Sport: Hockey
- Duration: OHL; September 24, 2014 – March 22, 2015; QMJHL; September 2014 – March 2015; WHL; September 2014 – March 2015
- Teams: 60
- TV partner(s): RDS; Rogers Sportsnet; Rogers TV; Shaw TV
- Season MVP: Connor McDavid (Erie Otters) (OHL)
- Top scorer: Dylan Strome (Erie Otters) (OHL) & Conor Garland (Moncton Wildcats) (QMJHL)

Memorial Cup
- Finals champions: Oshawa Generals (OHL) (5th title)
- Runners-up: Kelowna Rockets (WHL)

The 2014–15 OHL season was the 35th season of the Ontario Hockey League, in which twenty teams played 68 games each according to the regular season schedule, from September 24, 2014 to March 22, 2015. The Niagara IceDogs began play at their new arena, the Meridian Centre. The Ottawa 67's returned to TD Place Arena after a two-year hiatus due to a renovation. Brian Kilrea returned to coach the Ottawa 67's for one game on October 17, becoming the oldest coach in league history.

The Oshawa Generals won the J. Ross Robertson Cup for the 13th time in franchise history, as they defeated the Erie Otters in five games in the final round of the playoffs. The Generals qualified for the 2015 Memorial Cup held at Colisée Pepsi in Quebec City. Oshawa defeated the Kelowna Rockets 2–1 in overtime in the final game, winning the Memorial Cup for the fifth time in franchise history.

Near the end of the regular season, the Plymouth Whalers were sold, and the franchise moved to Flint, Michigan, becoming the Flint Firebirds. Also near the end of the regular season, the Belleville Bulls were sold and the franchise moved to Hamilton, Ontario, becoming the Hamilton Bulldogs.

== Regular season ==
=== Final standings ===
Note: DIV = Division; GP = Games played; W = Wins; L = Losses; OTL = Overtime losses; SL = Shootout losses; GF = Goals for; GA = Goals against; PTS = Points; x = clinched playoff berth; y = clinched division title; z = clinched conference title

=== Eastern conference ===
Rank	Team	DIV	GP	W	L	OTL	SL	PTS	GF	GA
1	z-Oshawa Generals	East	68	51	11	2	4	108	292	157
2	y-Barrie Colts	Central	68	41	24	1	2	85	278	227
3	x-North Bay Battalion	Central	68	37	20	6	5	85	237	195
4	x-Ottawa 67's	East	68	38	25	4	1	81	239	220
5	x-Niagara IceDogs	Central	68	37	27	2	2	78	274	237
6	x-Kingston Frontenacs	East	68	32	28	5	3	72	196	197
7	x-Belleville Bulls	East	68	27	33	3	5	62	203	246
8	x-Peterborough Petes	East	68	26	36	1	5	58	203	268
9	Mississauga Steelheads	Central	68	25	40	2	1	53	178	265
10	Sudbury Wolves	Central	68	12	54	1	1	26	149	323

=== Western conference ===
Rank	Team	DIV	GP	W	L	OTL	SL	PTS	GF	GA
1	z-Sault Ste. Marie Greyhounds	West	68	54	12	0	2	110	342	196
2	y-Erie Otters	Midwest	68	50	14	2	2	104	331	212
3	x-London Knights	Midwest	68	40	24	1	3	84	289	260
4	x-Guelph Storm	Midwest	68	38	26	2	2	80	237	237
5	x-Owen Sound Attack	Midwest	68	35	24	2	7	79	240	211
6	x-Kitchener Rangers	Midwest	68	32	26	3	7	74	216	221
7	x-Sarnia Sting	West	68	29	32	4	3	65	232	263
8	x-Saginaw Spirit	West	68	29	36	2	1	61	212	271
9	Plymouth Whalers	West	68	23	38	5	2	53	195	255
10	Windsor Spitfires	West	68	24	40	2	2	52	223	305

=== Scoring leaders ===
Note: GP = Games played; G = Goals; A = Assists; Pts = Points; PIM = Penalty minutes

Player	Team	GP	G	A	Pts	PIM
Dylan Strome	Erie Otters	68	45	84	129	32
Mitch Marner	London Knights	63	44	82	126	53
Connor McDavid	Erie Otters	47	44	76	120	48
Joseph Blandisi	Barrie Colts	68	52	60	112	126
Christian Dvorak	London Knights	66	41	68	109	24
Kevin Labanc	Barrie Colts	68	31	76	107	55
Alex DeBrincat	Erie Otters	68	51	53	104	73
Andrew Mangiapane	Barrie Colts	68	43	61	104	54
Max Domi	London Knights	57	32	70	102	66
Tyler Bertuzzi	Guelph Storm	68	43	55	98	91

=== Leading goaltenders ===
Note: GP = Games played; Mins = Minutes played; W = Wins; L = Losses: OTL = Overtime losses; SL = Shootout losses; GA = Goals Allowed; SO = Shutouts; GAA = Goals against average

Player	Team	GP	Mins	W	L	OTL	SL	GA	SO	Sv%	GAA
Ken Appleby	Oshawa Generals	50	2935	38	7	0	4	102	6	0.924	2.08
Lucas Peressini	Kingston Frontenacs	59	3413	30	20	3	3	132	5	0.922	2.32
Brandon Halverson	Sault Ste. Marie Greyhounds	50	2784	40	5	0	2	122	6	0.913	2.63
Liam Herbst	Ottawa 67's	39	2170	24	8	3	1	100	3	0.901	2.76
Jacob Smith	North Bay Battalion	56	3305	28	18	5	5	153	4	0.896	2.78

== Playoffs ==
Conference quarterfinals	Conference semifinals
1	Oshawa	4
8	Peterborough	1
1	Oshawa	4
5	Niagara	1
2	Barrie	4
7	Belleville	0
Eastern conference
3	North Bay	4
6	Kingston	0
2	Barrie	1
3	North Bay	4
4	Ottawa	2
5	Niagara	4
Note: Pairings are re-seeded after the first round.
1	Sault Ste. Marie	4
8	Saginaw	0
1	Sault Ste. Marie	4
4	Guelph	0
2	Erie	4
7	Sarnia	1
Western conference
3	London	4
6	Kitchener	2
2	Erie	4
3	London	0
4	Guelph	4
5	Owen Sound	1

Conference finals
1	Oshawa	4
3	North Bay	2
1	Sault Ste. Marie	2
2	Erie	4

Finals
E1	Oshawa	4
W2	Erie	1

=== Conference quarterfinals ===
==== Eastern conference quarterfinals ====
===== (1) Oshawa Generals vs. (8) Peterborough Petes =====
March 27	Oshawa Generals	7 – 2	Peterborough Petes	General Motors Centre	Recap
9:45 - Tobias Lindberg (1); 13:26 - pp - Tobias Lindberg (2); 14:13 - pp - Tobias Lindberg (3)		First period	Josh Maguire (1) - 4:27
4:26 - Hunter Smith (1)		Second period	Matt McCartney (1) - 3:18
6:29 - pp - Mitchell Vande Sompel (1); 14:03 - Michael McCarron (1); 19:06 - sh - Joe Manchurek (1)		Third period	No scoring
Ken Appleby (18 saves / 20 shots)		Goalie stats	Matthew Mancina (34 saves / 41 shots)

March 29	Oshawa Generals	2 – 1	Peterborough Petes	General Motors Centre	Recap
12:27 - Bradley Latour (1)		First period	No scoring
No scoring		Second period	No scoring
8:49 - Michael McCarron (2)		Third period	Matt Timms (1) - pp - 16:25
Ken Appleby (27 saves / 28 shots)		Goalie stats	Matthew Mancina (39 saves / 41 shots)

March 31	Peterborough Petes	3 – 1	Oshawa Generals	Peterborough Memorial Centre	Recap
11:21 - Greg Betzold (1)		First period	Cole Cassels (1) - 17:44
1:16 - Kyle Jenkins (1)		Second period	No scoring
19:48 - en - Michael Clarke (1)		Third period	No scoring
Matthew Mancina (46 saves / 47 shots)		Goalie stats	Ken Appleby (21 saves / 23 shots)

April 2	Peterborough Petes	0 – 4	Oshawa Generals	Peterborough Memorial Centre	Recap
No scoring		First period	Michael Dal Colle (1) - 7:57; Bradley Latour (2) - 13:39
No scoring		Second period	Mitchell Vande Sompel (2) - pp - 9:20; Matt Mistele (1) - pp - 19:27
No scoring		Third period	No scoring
Matthew Mancina (52 saves / 56 shots)		Goalie stats	Ken Appleby (27 saves / 27 shots)

April 3	Oshawa Generals	3 – 2	Peterborough Petes	General Motors Centre	Recap
2:49 - Matt Mistele (2)		First period	No scoring
12:09 - pp - Hunter Smith (2)		Second period	Greg Betzold (2) - pp - 5:20; Matt Spencer (1) - pp - 16:11
13:08 - pp - Matt Mistele (3)		Third period	No scoring
Ken Appleby (20 saves / 22 shots)		Goalie stats	Matthew Mancina (47 saves / 50 shots)

Oshawa wins series 4 – 1

===== (2) Barrie Colts vs. (7) Belleville Bulls =====
March 26	Barrie Colts	3 – 2	Belleville Bulls	Barrie Molson Centre	Recap
No scoring		First period	Jordan Subban (1) - pp - 8:03
7:59 - Garrett Hooey (1); 12:55 - Andrew Mangiapane (1); 15:37 - Ben Harpur (1)		Second period	No scoring
No scoring		Third period	Stephen Harper (1) - 10:49
Mackenzie Blackwood (40 saves / 42 shots)		Goalie stats	Charlie Graham (37 saves / 40 shots)

March 30	Barrie Colts	8 – 2	Belleville Bulls	Barrie Molson Centre	Recap
5:58 - pp - Garrett Hooey (2); 19:01 - pp - Joseph Blandisi (1); 19:25 - pp - Ben Harpur (2)		First period	Matt Luff (1) - pp - 10:13; Michael Cramarossa (1) - 12:19
12:15 - pp - Cordell James (1); 15:34 - Joseph Blandisi (2)		Second period
7:53 - Roy Radke (1); 10:15 - Cordell James (2); 17:47 - pp - Andrew Mangiapane (2)		Third period	No scoring
Mackenzie Blackwood (25 saves / 27 shots)		Goalie stats	Charlie Graham (34 saves / 42 shots)

April 1	Belleville Bulls	1 – 2	OT	Barrie Colts	Yardmen Arena	Recap
No scoring		First period		Garrett Hooey (3) - 18:46
12:28 - pp - Jordan Subban (2)		Second period		No scoring
No scoring		Third period		No scoring
No scoring		First overtime period		Joseph Blandisi (3) - 1:34
Charlie Graham (26 saves / 28 shots)		Goalie stats		Mackenzie Blackwood (42 saves / 43 shots)

April 2	Belleville Bulls	2 – 4	Barrie Colts	Yardmen Arena	Recap
13:05 - pp - Stephen Harper (2)		First period	Andrew Mangiapane (3) - 4:14
		Second period	Andrew Mangiapane (4) - pp - 5:33; Jonathan Laser (1) - 16:24
5:35 - Jordan Subban (3)		Third period	Joseph Blandisi (4) - en - 18:57
Charlie Graham (21 saves / 24 shots)		Goalie stats	Mackenzie Blackwood (38 saves / 40 shots)

Barrie wins series 4 – 0

===== (3) North Bay Battalion vs. (6) Kingston Frontenacs =====
March 27	North Bay Battalion	8 – 0	Kingston Frontenacs	North Bay Memorial Gardens	Recap
17:04 - Michael Amadio (1)		First period	No scoring
4:47 - Nick Paul (1); 11:43 - sh - Ryan Kujawinski (1); 13:27 - Riley Bruce (1); 15:32 - pp - Nick Paul (2); 16:43 - Zach Bratina (1)		Second period	No scoring
6:32 - pp - Ryan Kujawinski (2); 8:52 - Brenden Miller (1)		Third period	No scoring
Jacob Smith (18 saves / 18 shots)		Goalie stats	Lucas Peressini (25 saves / 31 shots); Jeremy Helvig (9 saves / 11 shots)

March 29	North Bay Battalion	3 – 2	Kingston Frontenacs	North Bay Memorial Gardens	Recap
10:01 - pp - Michael Amadio (2); 19:59 - Brenden Miller (2)		First period	Lawson Crouse (1) - pp - 3:48
17:58 - Michael Amadio (3)		Second period	No scoring
No scoring		Third period	Evan McEneny (1) - 14:43
Jacob Smith (25 saves / 27 shots)		Goalie stats	Lucas Peressini (25 saves / 28 shots)

March 31	Kingston Frontenacs	1 – 3	North Bay Battalion	Rogers K-Rock Centre	Recap
No scoring		First period	Nick Paul (3) - 8:14
0:39 - Lawson Crouse (2)		Second period	Alex Henriksson (1) - 11:44
No scoring		Third period	Mathew Santos (1) - en - 19:30
Lucas Peressini (31 saves / 33 shots)		Goalie stats	Jacob Smith (46 saves / 47 shots)

April 2	Kingston Frontenacs	1 – 3	North Bay Battalion	Rogers K-Rock Centre	Recap
No scoring		First period	Michael Amadio (4) - 14:41; Mathew Santos (2) - 19:53
No scoring		Second period	Mathew Santos (3) - 15:56
14:56 - sh - Juho Lammikko (1)		Third period	No scoring
Lucas Peressini (26 saves / 29 shots)		Goalie stats	Jacob Smith (26 saves / 27 shots)

North Bay wins series 4 – 0

===== (4) Ottawa 67's vs. (5) Niagara IceDogs =====
March 26	Ottawa 67's	8 – 5	Niagara IceDogs	TD Place Arena	Recap
2:18 - sh - Trent Mallette (1); 4:53 - Dante Salituro (1)		First period	Vince Dunn (1) - 17:41
13:13 - pp - Travis Konecny (1)		Second period	Jordan Maletta (1) - 2:58; Vince Dunn (2) - 5:40
0:41 - Nathan Todd (1); 1:30 - Jeremiah Addison (1); 4:07 - Sam Studnicka (1); 6:36 - Jeremiah Addison (2); 18:52 - pp - en - Dante Salituro (2)		Third period	Vince Dunn (3) - pp - 5:30; Vince Dunn (4) - pp - 13:46
Liam Herbst (25 saves / 30 shots)		Goalie stats	Brandon Hope (23 saves / 30 shots)

March 28	Ottawa 67's	8 – 2	Niagara IceDogs	TD Place Arena	Recap
No scoring		First period	No scoring
2:46 - Alex Lintuniemi (1); 5:50 - Nathan Todd (2); 6:13 - Curtis Meighan (1); 8:45 - pp - Nevin Guy (1); 10:31 - Dante Salituro (3); 19:08 - pp - Jeremiah Addison (3)		Second period	Brendan Perlini (1) - pp - 2:07
5:54 - Dante Salituro (4); 13:26 - pp - Jacob Middleton (1)		Third period	Mikkel Aagaard (1) - 8:09
Liam Herbst (22 saves / 24 shots)		Goalie stats	Brent Horan (5 saves / 10 saves); Brandon Hope (7 saves / 10 shots)

March 30	Niagara IceDogs	6 – 2	Ottawa 67's	Meridian Centre	Recap
4:31 - Billy Jenkins (1); 17:58 - Carter Verhaeghe (1)		First period	No scoring
4:02 - Jordan Maletta (2); 9:28 - Anthony DiFruscia (1)		Second period	No scoring
1:47 - Jordan Maletta (3); 14:40 - en - Billy Jenkins (2)		Third period	Jeremiah Addison (4) - pp - 2:38; Jeremiah Addison (5) - 6:14
Brandon Hope (21 saves / 23 shots)		Goalie stats	Liam Herbst (28 saves / 32 shots); Leonid Lazarev (11 saves / 12 shots)

April 1	Niagara IceDogs	4 – 3	OT	Ottawa 67's	Meridian Centre	Recap
5:35 - Josh Ho-Sang (1)		First period		Travis Konecny (2) - 2:23
10:07 - Vince Dunn (5)		Second period		Brendan Bell (1) - 16:33
17:18 - Graham Knott (1)		Third period		Evan de Haan (1) - 1:24
6:03 - Brendan Perlini (2)		First overtime period		No scoring
Brandon Hope (21 saves / 24 shots)		Goalie stats		Liam Herbst (26 saves / 30 shots)

April 3	Ottawa 67's	3 – 8	Niagara IceDogs	TD Place Arena	Recap
4:33 - Jeremiah Addison (6)		First period	Carter Verhaeghe (2) - 18:07
16:21 - Travis Konecny (3); 16:33 - Travis Barron (1)		Second period	Brendan Perlini (3) - 8:10; Anthony DiFruscia (2) - 8:29; Mikkel Aagaard (2) - 10:56
No scoring		Third period	Jordan Maletta (4) - 2:05; Brendan Perlini (4) - sh - 5:08; Graham Knott (2) - 15:17; Billy Jenkins (3) - 19:52
Liam Herbst (18 saves / 22 shots); Leonid Lazarev (14 saves / 17 shots)		Goalie stats	Brandon Hope (30 saves / 33 shots)

April 5	Niagara IceDogs	4 – 3	Ottawa 67's	Meridian Centre	Recap
15:33 - Jordan Maletta (5)		First period	Dante Salituro (5) - 19:42
8:52 - Cody Payne (1); 12:42 - Vince Dunn (6); 16:36 - pp - Brendan Perlini (5)		Second period	Taylor Davis (1) - pp - 10:46
No scoring		Third period	Nevin Guy (2) - 5:28
Brandon Hope (28 saves / 31 shots)		Goalie stats	Liam Herbst (23 saves / 27 shots)

Niagara wins series 4 – 2

==== Western Conference quarterfinals ====
===== (1) Sault Ste. Marie Greyhounds vs. (8) Saginaw Spirit =====
March 27	Sault Ste. Marie Greyhounds	5 – 1	Saginaw Spirit	Essar Centre	Recap
12:07 - Justin Bailey (1); 14:18 - pp - Michael Bunting (1)		First period	No scoring
6:05 - Zachary Senyshyn (1); 17:23 - sh - Jared McCann (1)		Second period	Connor Brown (1) - pp - 15:25
2:09 - Bryan Moore (1)		Third period	No scoring
Brandon Halverson (25 saves / 26 shots)		Goalie stats	Evan Cormier (29 saves / 34 shots)

March 28	Sault Ste. Marie Greyhounds	8 – 2	Saginaw Spirit	Essar Centre	Recap
9:40 - pp - Bryan Moore (2); 12:03 - Justin Bailey (2); 16:30 - - pp - Nick Ritchie (1); 18:08 - pp - Michael Bunting (2)		First period	No scoring
1:54 - Zachary Senyshyn (2); 8:50 - Michael Bunting (3); 16:57 - pp - Justin Bailey (3)		Second period	Artem Artemov (1) - pp - 4:03; Michael Holmes (1) - 14:17
17:34 - pp - Bryan Moore (3)		Third period	No scoring
Brandon Halverson (8 saves / 10 shots); Joseph Raaymakers (8 saves / 8 shots)		Goalie stats	Evan Cormier (44 saves / 52 shots)

March 31	Saginaw Spirit	0 – 4	Sault Ste. Marie Greyhounds	Dow Event Center	Recap
No scoring		First period	Michael Bunting (4) - 8:46; Tyler Ganly (1) - 17:35
No scoring		Second period	Blake Speers (1) - 17:32
No scoring		Third period	Nick Ritchie (2) - 7:21
Evan Cormier (38 saves / 42 shots)		Goalie stats	Brandon Halverson (24 saves / 24 shots)

April 2	Saginaw Spirit	2 – 5	Sault Ste. Marie Greyhounds	Dow Event Center	Recap
7:54 - Artem Artemov (2); 16:36 - Vladislav Kodola (1)		First period	No scoring
No scoring		Second period	Michael Bunting (5) - pp - 9:17
No scoring		Third period	Tim Gettinger (1) - 3:06; Nick Ritchie (3) - pp - 10:47; Sergey Tolchinsky (1) - 13:51; Darnell Nurse (1) - sh - en - 18:02
Evan Cormier (36 saves / 40 shots)		Goalie stats	Brandon Halverson (23 saves / 25 shots)

Sault Ste. Marie wins series 4 – 0

===== (2) Erie Otters vs. (7) Sarnia Sting =====
March 26	Erie Otters	2 – 3	Sarnia Sting	Erie Insurance Arena	Recap
No scoring		First period	No scoring
11:47 - pp - Alex DeBrincat (1)		Second period	Pavel Zacha (1) - 17:32; Jeff King (1) - pp - 19:57
11:02 - Remi Elie (1)		Third period	No scoring
Devin Williams (29 saves / 32 shots)		Goalie stats	Taylor Dupuis (32 saves / 34 shots)

March 27	Erie Otters	3 – 1	Sarnia Sting	Erie Insurance Arena	Recap
No scoring		First period	No scoring
4:56 - Connor McDavid (1); 11:12 - Remi Elie (2); 14:58 - pp - Nicholas Baptiste (1)		Second period	No scoring
No scoring		Third period	Nikita Korostelev (1) - 3:49
Devin Williams (24 saves / 25 shots)		Goalie stats	Taylor Dupuis (26 saves / 29 shots)

March 29	Sarnia Sting	5 – 6	Erie Otters	RBC Centre	Recap
3:31 - Stephen Pierog (2); 9:05 - Pavel Zacha (2)		First period	Dylan Strome (1) - 15:48
7:16 - Alexandre Renaud (1)		Second period	Jake Marchment (1) - 2:25; Dylan Strome (2) - pp - 3:42; Jake Marchment (2) - 3:55; Jake Marchment (3) - sh - 5:48
2:25 - pp - Hayden Hodgson (1); 3:17 - Troy Lajeunesse (1)		Third period	Connor McDavid (2) - 9:23
Taylor Dupuis (31 saves / 37 shots)		Goalie stats	Devin Williams (22 saves / 27 shots)

March 31	Sarnia Sting	3 – 4	OT	Erie Otters	RBC Centre	Recap
0:42 - Hayden Hodgson (2); 2:57 - sh - Kevin Spinozzi (1); 12:58 - Jordan Kyrou (1)		First period		No scoring
No scoring		Second period		Kyle Maksimovich (1) - 8:42
No scoring		Third period		Travis Dermott (1) - 0:46; Taylor Raddysh (1) - 1:11
No scoring		First overtime period		Dylan Strome (3) - 10:35
Taylor Dupuis (41 saves / 45 shots)		Goalie stats		Devin Williams (3 saves / 6 shots); Dan Dekoning (17 saves / 17 shots)

April 3	Erie Otters	7 – 0	Sarnia Sting	Erie Insurance Arena	Recap
13:29 - pp - Dylan Strome (4)		First period	No scoring
0:27 - pp - Nicholas Baptiste (2); 4:56 - Nicholas Baptiste (3); 18:14 - Jake Marchment (4)		Second period	No scoring
3:04 - Travis Dermott (2); 8:46 - sh - Connor McDavid (3); 17:03 - pp - Patrick Murphy (1)		Third period	No scoring
Devin Williams (26 saves / 26 shots)		Goalie stats	Taylor Dupuis (42 saves / 49 shots)

Erie wins series 4 – 1

===== (3) London Knights vs. (6) Kitchener Rangers =====
March 27	London Knights	3 – 1	Kitchener Rangers	Budweiser Gardens	Recap
7:09 - Mitch Marner (1); 16:57 - pp - Mitch Marner (2)		First period	No scoring
No scoring		Second period	No scoring
18:13 - en - Matt Rupert (1)		Third period	Darby Llewellyn (1) - pp - 3:15
Tyler Parsons (35 saves / 36 shots)		Goalie stats	Jake Paterson (32 saves / 34 shots)

March 29	London Knights	6 – 2	Kitchener Rangers	Budweiser Gardens	Recap
1:30 - Mitch Marner (3); 11:41 - pp - Josh Sterk (1); 15:43 - sh - Max Domi (1)		First period	Connor Bunnaman (1) - pp - 18:35
0:49 - Julius Bergman (1); 6:30 - Mitch Marner (4)		Second period	No scoring
4:04 - sh - Mitch Marner (5)		Third period	Mike Davies (1) - pp - 17:56
Tyler Parsons (41 saves / 43 shots)		Goalie stats	Jake Paterson (8 saves / 13 shots); Dawson Carty (18 saves / 19 shots)

March 31	Kitchener Rangers	6 – 10	London Knights	Kitchener Memorial Auditorium	Recap
3:56 - Liam Maaskant (1); 16:10 - David Miller (1); 19:16 - pp - Nick Magyar (1)		First period	Owen MacDonald (1) - 8:35; Christian Dvorak (1) - pp - 15:38
0:28 - Darby Llewellyn (2); 16:51 - David Miller (2)		Second period	Matt Rupert (2) - pp - 6:51; Julius Bergman (2) - 8:57; Matt Rupert (3) - 18:07
11:10 - Liam Maaskant (2)		Third period	Mitch Marner (6) - 4:27; Max Domi (2) - 6:09; Christian Dvorak (2) - 12:08; Mitch Marner (7) - 13:37; Jack Hidi (1) - en - 19:01
Jake Paterson (24 saves / 33 shots)		Goalie stats	Tyler Parsons (35 saves / 41 shots)

April 2	Kitchener Rangers	5 – 4	London Knights	Kitchener Memorial Auditorium	Recap
No scoring		First period	Jack Hidi (2) - 13:04
2:26 - Gustaf Franzen (1); 5:11 - Adam Mascherin (1); 10:20 - Ryan MacInnis (1); 11:09 - Gustaf Franzen (2)		Second period	Christian Dvorak (3) - 16:06
14:11 - Mason Kohn (1)		Third period	Mitch Marner (8) - pp - 12:31; Christian Dvorak (4) - 18:01
Jake Paterson (32 saves / 36 shots)		Goalie stats	Tyler Parsons (33 saves / 38 shots)

April 3	London Knights	3 – 6	Kitchener Rangers	Budweiser Gardens	Recap
3:49 - Julius Bergman (3)		First period	Frank Hora (1) - 13:12
1:06 - sh - Max Domi (3)		Second period	Darby Llewellyn (3) - 14:18; Ryan MacInnis (2) - 17:05
18:16 - Matt Rupert (4)		Third period	Brandon Robinson (1) - 16:16; Frank Hora (2) - en - 18:39; Ryan MacInnis (3) - en - 19:46
Tyler Parsons (36 saves / 40 shots)		Goalie stats	Jake Paterson (31 saves / 34 shots)

April 5	Kitchener Rangers	0 – 5	London Knights	Kitchener Memorial Auditorium	Recap
No scoring		First period	No scoring
No scoring		Second period	Victor Mete (1) - 10:26; Aiden Jamieson (1) - 13:26; Christian Dvorak (5) - 17:54; Matt Rupert (5) - 18:36
No scoring		Third period	Tait Seguin (1) - pp - 19:20
Jake Paterson (37 saves / 42 shots)		Goalie stats	Tyler Parsons (30 saves / 30 shots)

London wins series 4 – 2

===== (4) Guelph Storm vs. (5) Owen Sound Attack =====
March 27	Guelph Storm	1 – 6	Owen Sound Attack	Sleeman Centre	Recap
No scoring		First period	2:55 - Jeffrey Gilligan (1); 8:42 - Erik Bradford (1)
Jason Dickinson (1) - 2:07		Second period	5:08 - pp - Damir Sharipzyanov (1)
No scoring		Third period	5:18 - pp - Connor Walters (1); 7:22 - Justin Brack (1); 12:21 - pp - Daniel Milne (1)
Justin Nichols (8 saves / 11 shots); Brad Van Schubert (11 saves / 14 shots)		Goalie stats	Jack Flinn (30 saves / 31 shots)

March 29	Guelph Storm	5 – 4	OT	Owen Sound Attack	Sleeman Centre	Recap
12:41 - pp - Tyler Bertuzzi (1); 15:51 - Jason Dickinson (2)		First period		No scoring
No scoring		Second period		Santino Centorame (1) - 7:29; Chris Bigras (1) - 8:44; Daniel Milne (2) - 10:47
1:10 - Tyler Bertuzzi (2); 5:58 - pp - Tyler Bertuzzi (3)		Third period		Kyle Platzer (1) - pp - 11:13
2:47 - Chris Marchese (1)		First overtime period		No scoring
Justin Nichols (32 saves / 36 shots)		Goalie stats		Jack Flinn (22 saves / 27 shots)

March 31	Owen Sound Attack	1 – 2	Guelph Storm	Bayshore Community Centre	Recap
No scoring		First period	Tyler Bertuzzi (4) - 6:53; Robby Fabbri (1) - 13:18
No scoring		Second period	No scoring
11:02 - pp - Zach Nastasiuk (1)		Third period	No scoring
Jack Flinn (22 saves / 24 shots)		Goalie stats	Justin Nichols (34 saves / 35 shots)

April 1	Owen Sound Attack	2 – 3	OT	Guelph Storm	Bayshore Community Centre	Recap
No scoring		First period		No scoring
14:54 - pp - Petrus Palmu (1)		Second period		Jason Dickinson (3) - 12:56
8:35 - Daniel Milne (3)		Third period		Garrett McFadden (1) - sh - 18:33
No scoring		First overtime period		Givani Smith (1) - 5:24
Jack Flinn (34 saves / 37 shots)		Goalie stats		Justin Nichols (48 saves / 50 shots)

April 4	Guelph Storm	2 – 1	Owen Sound Attack	Sleeman Centre	Recap
No scoring		First period	Ethan Szypula (1) - 8:50
10:51 - Phil Baltisberger (1); 12:09 - sh - Pius Suter (1)		Second period	No scoring
No scoring		Third period	No scoring
Justin Nichols (28 saves / 29 shots)		Goalie stats	Jack Flinn (32 saves / 34 shots)

Guelph wins series 4 – 1

=== Conference semifinals ===
==== Eastern conference semifinals ====
===== (1) Oshawa Generals vs. (5) Niagara IceDogs =====
April 10	Oshawa Generals	5 – 3	Niagara IceDogs	General Motors Centre	Recap
No scoring		First period	No scoring
3:29 - pp - Michael Dal Colle (2); 6:57 - Hunter Smith (3); 16:46 - Michael Dal Colle (3)		Second period	Billy Jenkins (4) - 8:20
1:22 - Michael McCarron (3); 10:02 - pp - Mitchell Vande Sompel (3)		Third period	Johnny Corneil (1) - 15:00; Carter Verhaeghe (3) - 16:52
Ken Appleby (26 saves / 29 shots)		Goalie stats	Brandon Hope (33 saves / 38 shots); Brent Moran (7 saves / 7 shots)

April 12	Oshawa Generals	6 – 1	Niagara IceDogs	General Motors Centre	Recap
8:56 - Michael Dal Colle (4); 11:54 - Michael McCarron (4)		First period	No scoring
No scoring		Second period	Brendan Perlini (6) - pp - 16:19
3:40 - pp - Tobias Lindberg (4); 13:16 - pp - Matt Mistele (4); 18:44 - Hunter Smith (4); 19:13 - Stephen Desrocher (1)		Third period	No scoring
Ken Appleby (26 saves / 27 shots)		Goalie stats	Brandon Hope (37 saves / 43 shots)

April 14	Niagara IceDogs	7 – 3	Oshawa Generals	Meridian Centre	Recap
0:27 - Billy Jenkins (5); 17:44 - pp - Brendan Perlini (7)		First period	Tobias Lindberg (5) - 7:56; Aidan Wallace (1) - 16:00
13:23 - Billy Jenkins (6); 18:36 - Aleksandar Mikulovich (1)		Second period	No scoring
1:37 - pp - Carter Verhaeghe (4); 11:49 - Billy Jenkins (7); 16:00 - sh - en - Mikkel Aagaard (3)		Third period	Josh Brown (1) - sh - 9:56
Brandon Hope (38 saves / 41 shots)		Goalie stats	Ken Appleby (34 saves / 40 shots); Jeremy Brodeur (0 saves / 0 shots)

April 16	Niagara IceDogs	4 – 7	Oshawa Generals	Meridian Centre	Recap
No scoring		First period	Hunter Smith (5) - pp - 14:45; Michael McCarron (5) - 19:08
No scoring		Second period	Cole Cassels (2) - 0:20; Michael Dal Colle (5) - 3:44
3:00 - pp - Carter Verhaeghe (5); 7:59 - Carter Verhaeghe (6); 8:16 - Jordan Maletta (6); 18:29 - Mikkel Aagaard (4)		Third period	Michael McCarron (6) - 13:06; Tobias Lindberg (6) - 15:46; Michael Dal Colle (6) - en - 18:56
Brandon Hope (19 saves / 25 shots)		Goalie stats	Ken Appleby (30 saves / 34 shots)

April 17	Oshawa Generals	4 – 2	Niagara IceDogs	General Motors Centre	Recap
7:15 - Matt Mistele (5)		First period	No scoring
15:11 - pp - Cole Cassels (3)		Second period	Ryan Mantha (1) - 17:41
5:13 - pp - Cole Cassels (4); 17:42 - pp - Cole Cassels (5)		Third period	Brian Brosnan (1) - 7:29
Ken Appleby (29 saves / 31 shots)		Goalie stats	Brandon Hope (33 saves / 37 shots)

Oshawa wins series 4 – 1

===== (2) Barrie Colts vs. (3) North Bay Battalion =====
April 10	Barrie Colts	3 – 2	North Bay Battalion	Barrie Molson Centre	Recap
6:41 - Andrew Mangiapane (5)		First period	Nick Moutrey (1) - 10:27
7:29 - Jonathan Laser (2)		Second period	Ryan Kujawinski (3) - sh - 8:39
5:08 - Joseph Blandisi (5)		Third period	No scoring
Mackenzie Blackwood (34 saves / 36 shots)		Goalie stats	Jacob Smith (27 saves / 30 shots)

April 12	Barrie Colts	2 – 3	North Bay Battalion	Barrie Molson Centre	Recap
No scoring		First period	Kyle Wood (1) - pp - 4:39; Ray Huether (1) - 14:58
1:25 - Brendan Lemieux (1); 3:46 - Roy Radke (2)		Second period	No scoring
No scoring		Third period	Nick Paul (4) - sh - 4:08
Mackenzie Blackwood (31 saves / 34 shots)		Goalie stats	Jacob Smith (24 saves / 26 shots)

April 14	North Bay Battalion	4 – 2	Barrie Colts	North Bay Memorial Gardens	Recap
11:56 - pp - Nick Moutrey (2)		First period	Justin Scott (1) - 5:02
12:05 - Ray Huether (2); 18:15 - Brenden Miller (3)		Second period	Joseph Blandisi (6) - 13:15
3:50 - pp - Ryan Kujawinski (4)		Third period	No scoring
Jacob Smith (13 saves / 15 shots)		Goalie stats	Mackenzie Blackwood (36 saves / 40 shots)

April 16	North Bay Battalion	4 – 3	2OT	Barrie Colts	North Bay Memorial Gardens	Recap
13:49 - pp - Marcus McIvor (1)		First period		No scoring
2:46 - pp - Michael Amadio (5)		Second period		No scoring
4:43 - Nick Moutrey (3)		Third period		Rasmus Andersson (1) - 4:03; Roy Radke (3) - 8:54; Roy Radke (4) - 13:50
3:49 - Ryan Kujawinski (5)		Second overtime period		No scoring
Jacob Smith (16 saves / 19 shots)		Goalie stats		Mackenzie Blackwood (45 saves / 49 shots)

April 18	Barrie Colts	5 – 7	North Bay Battalion	Barrie Molson Centre	Recap
4:33 - Matthew Kreis (1)		First period	Mathew Santos (4) - 9:52; Nick Paul (5) - pp - 10:37; Brenden Miller (4) - 15:39; Nick Paul (6) - 17:18
2:20 - pp - Andrew Mangiapane (6); 15:09 - Michael Webster (1)		Second period	Michael Amadio (6) - pp - 10:38
8:23 - pp - Kevin Labanc (1); 16:16 - Kevin Labanc (2)		Third period	Nick Moutrey (4) - pp - 0:21; Mathew Santos (5) - 18:21
Mackenzie Blackwood (29 saves / 36 shots)		Goalie stats	Jacob Smith (33 saves / 38 shots)

North Bay wins series 4 – 1

==== Western conference semifinals ====
===== (1) Sault Ste. Marie Greyhounds vs. (4) Guelph Storm =====
April 8	Sault Ste. Marie Greyhounds	7 – 4	Guelph Storm	Essar Centre	Recap
No scoring		First period	No scoring
5:36 - pp - Zachary Senyshyn (3); 7:58 - Bryan Moore (4); 19:59 - pp - Sergey Tolchinsky (2)		Second period	Givani Smith (2) - pp - 12:42; C.J. Garcia (1) - 10:08; C.J. Garcia (2) - pp - 15:37; Jason Dickinson (4) - pp - 17:00
0:51 - pp - Justin Bailey (4); 9:23 - Michael Bunting (6); 9:53 - Nick Ritchie (4); 19:05 - en - Nick Ritchie (5)		Third period	No scoring
Brandon Halverson (21 saves / 25 shots)		Goalie stats	Justin Nichols (31 saves / 37 shots)

April 9	Sault Ste. Marie Greyhounds	9 – 3	Guelph Storm	Essar Centre	Recap
8:14 - Nick Ritchie (6); 9:51 - Justin Bailey (5); 16:50 - Sergey Tolchinsky (3); 17:42 - Jean Dupuy (1); 18:12 - Nick Ritchie (7)		First period	Tyler Bertuzzi (5) - 3:08
1:21 - Jean Dupuy (2); 12:46 - pp - Gustav Bouramman (1); 14:00 - Zachary Senyshyn (4); 18:22 - Nick Ritchie (8)		Second period	Chris Marchese (2) - 10:30; Chris Marchese (3) - sh - 13:12
No scoring		Third period	No scoring
Brandon Halverson (18 saves / 21 shots); Joseph Raaymakers (8 saves / 8 shots)		Goalie stats	Justin Nichols (8 saves / 10 shots); Brad Van Schubert (35 saves / 42 shots)

April 12	Guelph Storm	1 – 6	Sault Ste. Marie Greyhounds	Sleeman Centre	Recap
No scoring		First period	Jared McCann (2) - 2:01; Blake Speers (2) - pp - 11:57
13:27 - pp - Tyler Bertuzzi (6)		Second period	Darnell Nurse (2) - pp - 1:20; Nick Ritchie (9) - 1:50; Justin Bailey (6) - pp - 7:09; Keigan Goetz (1) - 18:08
No scoring		Third period	No scoring
Justin Nichols (25 saves / 31 shots); Brad Van Schubert (9 saves / 9 shots)		Goalie stats	Brandon Halverson (26 saves / 27 shots)

April 14	Guelph Storm	2 – 3	Sault Ste. Marie Greyhounds	Sleeman Centre	Recap
No scoring		First period	No scoring
16:44 - Pius Suter (2)		Second period	Bryan Moore (5) - 8:42; Jared McCann (3) - 13:53; Nick Ritchie (10) - 14:46
1:27 - sh - Pius Suter (3)		Third period	No scoring
Brad Van Schubert (32 saves / 35 shots)		Goalie stats	Brandon Halverson (28 saves / 30 shots)

Sault Ste. Marie wins series 4 – 0

===== (2) Erie Otters vs. (3) London Knights =====
April 9	Erie Otters	5 – 2	London Knights	Erie Insurance Arena	Recap
No scoring		First period	Mitch Marner (9) - sh - 5:08
4:11 - pp - Dylan Strome (5); 14:21 - sh - Nicholas Baptiste (4); 18:16 - sh - Connor McDavid (4)		Second period	Max Domi (4) - 0:28
10:37 - Alex DeBrincat (2); 17:28 - en - Connor McDavid (5)		Third period	No scoring
Devin Williams (16 saves / 18 shots)		Goalie stats	Tyler Parsons (41 saves / 45 shots)

April 10	Erie Otters	7 – 3	London Knights	Erie Insurance Arena	Recap
5:27 - Connor McDavid (6); 19:15 - Connor McDavid (7)		First period	No scoring
6:41 - Connor McDavid (8); 7:29 - Jake Marchment (5); 13:42 - Connor McDavid (9)		Second period	No scoring
16:04 - Connor McDavid (10); 19:41 - en - Taylor Raddysh (2)		Third period	Chandler Yakimowicz (1) - 10:25; Aaron Berisha (1) - 12:10; Jack Hidi (3) - 15:30
Devin Williams (21 saves / 24 shots)		Goalie stats	Tyler Parsons (13 saves / 15 shots); Michael Giugovaz (22 saves / 26 shots)

April 12	London Knights	1 – 4	Erie Otters	Budweiser Gardens	Recap
No scoring		First period	Travis Dermott (3) - pp - 5:40
No scoring		Second period	No scoring
13:24 - Joel Wigle (1)		Third period	Nick Betz (1) - 4:55; Jake Marchment (6) - 10:37; Alex DeBrincat (3) - 12:41
Michael Giugovaz (37 saves / 41 shots)		Goalie stats	Devin Williams (27 saves / 28 shots)

April 14	London Knights	2 – 5	Erie Otters	Budweiser Gardens	Recap
No scoring		First period	No scoring
1:54 - Julius Bergman (4); 7:08 - Max Domi (5)		Second period	Dylan Strome (6) - 6:32; Kyle Maksimovich (2) - 17:58
No scoring		Third period	Taylor Raddysh (3) - 16:13; Travis Dermott (4) - en - 18:09; Connor McDavid (11) - en - 19:52
Michael Giugovaz (41 saves / 44 shots)		Goalie stats	Devin Williams (35 saves / 37 shots)

Erie wins series 4 – 0

=== Conference finals ===
==== Eastern conference finals ====
===== (1) Oshawa Generals vs. (3) North Bay Battalion =====
April 24	Oshawa Generals	1 – 6	North Bay Battalion	General Motors Centre	Recap
10:12 - Michael McCarron (7)		First period	No scoring
No scoring		Second period	Zach Poirier (1) - 3:55; Ray Huether (3) - 13:12; Nick Paul (7) - sh - 17:18
No scoring		Third period	Zach Bratina (2) - 2:49; Nick Moutrey (5) - 6:33; Nick Moutrey (6) - 16:37
Ken Appleby (22 saves / 27 shots); Jeremy Brodeur (1 save / 2 shots)		Goalie stats	Jacob Smith (30 saves / 31 shots)

April 26	Oshawa Generals	1 – 0	OT	North Bay Battalion	General Motors Centre	Recap
No scoring		First period		No scoring
No scoring		Second period		No scoring
No scoring		Third period		No scoring
1:01 - Dakota Mermis (1)		First overtime period		No scoring
Ken Appleby (33 saves / 33 shots)		Goalie stats		Jacob Smith (38 saves / 39 shots)

April 28	North Bay Battalion	2 – 1	OT	Oshawa Generals	North Bay Memorial Gardens	Recap
15:54 - Ray Huether (4)		First period		Stephen Desrocher (2) - pp - 11:57
No scoring		Second period		No scoring
No scoring		Third period		No scoring
10:28 - Ryan Kujawinski (6)		First overtime period		No scoring
Jacob Smith (34 saves / 35 shots)		Goalie stats		Ken Appleby (31 saves / 33 shots)

April 29	North Bay Battalion	2 – 3	Oshawa Generals	North Bay Memorial Gardens	Recap
15:14 - Mathew Santos (6)		First period	No scoring
13:53 - pp - Marcus McIvor (2)		Second period	Matt Mistele (6) - pp - 8:05; Michael Dal Colle (7) - pp - 16:36
No scoring		Third period	Stephen Desrocher (3) - 8:23
Jacob Smith (13 saves / 16 shots)		Goalie stats	Ken Appleby (24 saves / 26 shots)

May 1	Oshawa Generals	4 – 1	North Bay Battalion	General Motors Centre	Recap
0:41 - Matt Mistele (7)		First period	No scoring
17:39 - pp - Anthony Cirelli (1)		Second period	Ray Huether (5) - sh - 5:36
3:22 - pp - Cole Cassels (6); 10:19 - pp - Hunter Smith (6)		Third period	No scoring
Ken Appleby (36 saves / 37 shots)		Goalie stats	Jacob Smith (31 saves / 35 shots)

May 3	North Bay Battalion	1 – 2	Oshawa Generals	North Bay Memorial Gardens	Recap
No scoring		First period	Hunter Smith (7) - 6:04
No scoring		Second period	Matt Mistele (8) - 9:47
12:36 - pp - Nick Moutrey (7)		Third period	No scoring
Jacob Smith (22 saves / 24 shots)		Goalie stats	Ken Appleby (20 saves / 21 shots)

Oshawa wins series 4 – 2

==== Western conference finals ====
===== (1) Sault Ste. Marie Greyhounds vs. (2) Erie Otters =====
April 23	Sault Ste. Marie Greyhounds	6 – 3	Erie Otters	Essar Centre	Recap
6:13 - Bryan Moore (6); 6:56 - Jean Dupuy (3)		First period	No scoring
10:10 - pp - Justin Bailey (7)		Second period	Connor McDavid (12) - pp - 17:44
3:22 - Gabe Guertler (1); 14:17 - Nick Ritchie (11); 18:20 - en - Gabe Guertler (2)		Third period	Connor McDavid (13) - pp - 0:16; Connor McDavid (14) - pp - 1:06
Brandon Halverson (39 saves / 42 shots)		Goalie stats	Devin Williams (26 saves / 31 shots)

April 24	Sault Ste. Marie Greyhounds	2 – 5	Erie Otters	Essar Centre	Recap
9:44 - Nick Ritchie (12)		First period	Dylan Strome (7) - 19:52
No scoring		Second period	Dylan Strome (8) - pp - 18:54
10:11 - pp - Blake Speers (3)		Third period	Connor McDavid (15) - 0:23; Kyle Maksimovich (3) - 1:46; Connor McDavid (16) - en - 19:30
Brandon Halverson (23 saves / 27 shots)		Goalie stats	Devin Williams (27 saves / 29 shots)

April 26	Erie Otters	4 – 2	Sault Ste. Marie Greyhounds	Erie Insurance Arena	Recap
5:55 - Nick Betz (2); 10:51 - sh - Connor McDavid (17)		First period	Tyler Ganly (2) - 16:39
1:01 - Connor McDavid (18)		Second period	Nick Ritchie (13) - 14:57
18:21 - en - Nicholas Baptiste (5)		Third period	No scoring
Devin Williams (33 saves / 35 shots)		Goalie stats	Brandon Halverson (18 saves / 21 shots)

April 28	Erie Otters	7 – 5	Sault Ste. Marie Greyhounds	Erie Insurance Arena	Recap
2:35 - pp - Nicholas Baptiste (6); 8:29 - sh - Alex DeBrincat (4)		First period	Jean Dupuy (4) - 0:38; Michael Bunting (7) - 9:58
11:24 - pp - Nicholas Baptiste (7)		Second period	Gabe Guertler (3) - 8:09
3:32 - pp - Dylan Strome (9); 12:31 - Alex DeBrincat (5); 13:23 - Nicholas Baptiste (8); 19:22 - en - Nicholas Baptiste (9)		Third period	Jared McCann (4) - 2:51; Sergey Tolchinsky (4) - 18:04
Devin Williams (32 saves / 37 shots)		Goalie stats	Brandon Halverson (26 saves / 32 shots)

April 30	Sault Ste. Marie Greyhounds	4 – 2	Erie Otters	Essar Centre	Recap
12:09 - pp - Jared McCann (5)		First period	Nicholas Baptiste (10) - 2:06
No scoring		Second period	No scoring
3:36 - Michael Bunting (8); 12:55 - Bryan Moore (7); 19:58 - sh - en - Gabe Guertler (4)		Third period	Travis Dermott (5) - 5:13
Brandon Halverson (26 saves / 28 shots)		Goalie stats	Devin Williams (36 saves / 39 shots)

May 2	Erie Otters	7 – 3	Sault Ste. Marie Greyhounds	Erie Insurance Arena	Recap
2:49 - Nick Betz (3); 10:12 - Jake Marchment (7)		First period	Michael Bunting (9) - 6:03; Jared McCann (6) - pp - 8:45
8:46 - pp - Alex DeBrincat (6); 10:19 - pp - Connor McDavid (19)		Second period	No scoring
11:53 - Nicholas Baptiste (11); 14:32 - Alex DeBrincat (7); 17:08 - en - Alex DeBrincat (8)		Third period	Darnell Nurse (3) - pp - 4:04
Devin Williams (24 saves / 27 shots)		Goalie stats	Brandon Halverson (22 saves / 28 shots)

Erie wins series 4 – 2

=== J. Ross Robertson Cup ===
==== (E1) Oshawa Generals vs. (W2) Erie Otters ====
May 8	Oshawa Generals	4 – 1	Erie Otters	General Motors Centre	Recap
10:35 - pp - Michael McCarron (8)		First period	No scoring
0:20 - Mitchell Vande Sompel (4)		Second period	Remi Elie (3) - pp - 19:24
0:46 - Michael Dal Colle (8); 17:39 - Hunter Smith (8)		Third period	No scoring
Ken Appleby (18 saves / 19 shots)		Goalie stats	Devin Williams (27 saves / 31 shots)

May 9	Oshawa Generals	5 – 1	Erie Otters	General Motors Centre	Recap
5:21 - pp - Matt Mistele (9)		First period	Nick Betz (4) - 14:58
No scoring		Second period	No scoring
12:17 - Anthony Cirelli (2); 13:40 - Tobias Lindberg (7); 15:42 - Cole Cassels (7); 17:29 - pp - Matt Mistele (10)		Third period	No scoring
Ken Appleby (32 saves / 33 shots)		Goalie stats	Devin Williams (28 saves / 33 shots)

May 11	Erie Otters	4 – 3	Oshawa Generals	Erie Insurance Arena	Recap
14:32 - Remi Elie (4); 18:53 - Alex DeBrincat (9)		First period	No scoring
No scoring		Second period	No scoring
5:14 - Connor McDavid (20); 12:24 - Nick Betz (5)		Third period	Cole Cassels (8) - 6:29; Sam Harding (1) - 16:09; Cole Cassels (9) - pp - 18:08
Devin Williams (24 saves / 27 shots)		Goalie stats	Ken Appleby (25 saves / 29 shots)

May 13	Erie Otters	5 – 6	OT	Oshawa Generals	Erie Insurance Arena	Recap
15:10 - pp - Nicholas Baptiste (12); 15:43 - pp - Dylan Strome (10)		First period		Matt Mistele (11) - 9:21; Mitchell Vande Sompel (5) - pp - 10:37
12:22 - Jake Marchment (8); 15:37 - Darren Raddysh (1); 17:44 - Connor McDavid (21)		Second period		Matt Mistele (12) - 4:44; Stephen Desrocher (4) - 12:12; Josh Brown (2) - 19:59
No scoring		Third period		No scoring
No scoring		First overtime period		Cole Cassels (10) - pp - 8:19
Devin Williams (26 saves / 32 shots)		Goalie stats		Ken Appleby (27 saves / 32 shots)

May 15	Oshawa Generals	6 – 2	Erie Otters	General Motors Centre	Recap
13:07 - Hunter Smith (9)		First period	Nick Betz (6) - 12:24
0:26 - Sam Harding (2); 2:56 - pp - Michael McCarron (9); 4:52 - pp - Matt Mistele (13)		Second period	Darren Raddysh (2) - pp - 9:57
14:37 - Bradley Latour (3); 19:12 - sh - en - Aidan Wallace (2)		Third period	No scoring
Ken Appleby (30 saves / 32 shots)		Goalie stats	Devin Williams (9 saves / 13 shots); Dan Dekoning (12 saves / 13 shots)

Oshawa wins series 4 – 1

=== J. Ross Robertson Cup champions roster ===
2014-15 Oshawa Generals
Goaltenders: (Canada) 35 – Ken Appleby; (United States) 56 – Jeremy Brodeur	Defencemen: (Canada) 3 – Josh Brown – C; (Canada) 6 – Will Petschenig; (United States) 7 – Chris Carlisle; (Denmark) 18 – Sonny Hertzberg; (Canada) 24 – Stephen Templeton; (Canada) 26 – Daniel Robertson; (Canada) 37 – Stephen Desrocher; (United States) 44 – Dakota Mermis; (Canada) 58 – Mitchell Vande Sompel	Wingers: (Canada) 14 – Bradley Latour; (United States) 15 – Michael Turner; (Canada) 17 – Brent Pedersen; (Canada) 20 – Matt Mistele; (Sweden) 23 – Tobias Lindberg; (Canada) 25 – Kenny Huether; (Canada) 29 – Joe Manchurek; (Canada) 34 – Hunter Smith – A; (United States) 55 – Michael McCarron; (Canada) 71 – Michael Dal Colle – A	Centres: (Canada) 10 – Aidan Wallace; (United States) 19 – Cole Cassels – A; (Canada) 22 – Anthony Cirelli; (Canada) 89 – Sam Harding; Coach: (Canada) D. J. Smith; General Manager: (Canada) Roger Hunt

=== Playoff scoring leaders ===
Note: GP = Games played; G = Goals; A = Assists; Pts = Points; PIM = Penalty minutes

Player	Team	GP	G	A	Pts	PIM
Connor McDavid	Erie Otters	20	21	28	49	12
Cole Cassels	Oshawa Generals	21	10	21	31	14
Michael Dal Colle	Oshawa Generals	21	8	23	31	2
Nick Ritchie	Sault Ste. Marie Greyhounds	14	13	13	26	28
Remi Elie	Erie Otters	20	4	20	24	20
Nicholas Baptiste	Erie Otters	20	12	11	23	10
Dylan Strome	Erie Otters	20	10	12	22	12
Tobias Lindberg	Oshawa Generals	21	7	12	19	8
Michael McCarron	Oshawa Generals	21	9	9	18	33
Hunter Smith	Oshawa Generals	21	9	9	18	38

=== Playoff leading goaltenders ===
Note: GP = Games played; Mins = Minutes played; W = Wins; L = Losses: OTL = Overtime losses; SL = Shootout losses; GA = Goals Allowed; SO = Shutouts; GAA = Goals against average

Player	Team	GP	Mins	W	L	GA	SO	Sv%	GAA
Jacob Smith	North Bay Battalion	15	931	10	5	31	1	0.927	2.00
Ken Appleby	Oshawa Generals	21	1259	16	5	47	2	0.922	2.24
Jack Flinn	Owen Sound Attack	5	305	1	4	13	0	0.915	2.56
Mackenzie Blackwood	Barrie Colts	9	562	5	4	27	0	0.922	2.88
Brandon Halverson	Sault Ste. Marie Greyhounds	14	796	10	4	39	1	0.893	2.94

== Awards ==
J. Ross Robertson Cup (OHL Champions):	Oshawa Generals
Hamilton Spectator Trophy (best regualer season record):	Sault Ste. Marie Greyhounds
Bobby Orr Trophy (Eastern conference playoffs champion):	Oshawa Generals
Wayne Gretzky Trophy (Western conference playoffs champion):	Erie Otters
Emms Trophy (regular season champion Central division):	Barrie Colts
Leyden Trophy (regular season champion East division):	Oshawa Generals
Holody Trophy (regular season champion MidWest division):	Erie Otters
Bumbacco Trophy (regular season champion West division):	Sault Ste. Marie Greyhounds
Red Tilson Trophy (MVP):	Connor McDavid, Erie Otters
Eddie Powers Memorial Trophy (most points):	Dylan Strome, Erie Otters
Matt Leyden Trophy (coach of the year):	Sheldon Keefe, Sault Ste. Marie Greyhounds
Jim Mahon Memorial Trophy (Right Winger with the most points):	Mitch Marner, London Knights
Max Kaminsky Trophy (most outstanding defenceman):	Tony DeAngelo, Sarnia Sting & Sault Ste. Marie Greyhounds
OHL Goaltender of the Year:	Lucas Peressini, Kingston Frontenacs
Jack Ferguson Award (number 1 pick in OHL draft):	David Levin, Sudbury Wolves
Dave Pinkney Trophy (goaltenders with lowest goals against average):	Ken Appleby & Jeremy Brodeur, Oshawa Generals
OHL Executive of the Year:
Emms Family Award (Rookie of the Year):	Alex DeBrincat, Erie Otters
F. W. "Dinty" Moore Trophy (first-year goaltender with the best goals against average):	Michael McNiven, Owen Sound Attack
Dan Snyder Memorial Trophy (positive role model):	Nick Paul, North Bay Battalion
William Hanley Trophy (most sportsmanlike player):	Dylan Strome, Erie Otters
Leo Lalonde Memorial Trophy (best overage player):	Joseph Blandisi, Barrie Colts
Bobby Smith Trophy (Scholastic Player of the Year):	Connor McDavid, Erie Otters
Roger Neilson Memorial Award (top academic post-secondary school player):	Justin Nichols, Guelph Storm
Ivan Tennant Memorial Award (top academic high school player):	Stephen Dhillon, Niagara IceDogs
Mickey Renaud Captain's Trophy (best OHL team captain):	Max Domi, London Knights
Tim Adams Memorial Trophy (most valuable player of the OHL Cup):	Ryan McLeod, Toronto Marlboros
Wayne Gretzky 99 Award (MVP in the playoffs):	Connor McDavid, Erie Otters

== All-Star teams ==
The OHL All-Star Teams were selected by the OHL's General Managers.

=== First team ===
- Connor McDavid, Centre, Erie Otters
- Max Domi, Left Wing, London Knights
- Mitch Marner, Right Wing, London Knights
- Tony DeAngelo, Defence, Sarnia & Sault Ste. Marie
- Chris Bigras, Defence, Owen Sound Attack
- Lucas Peressini, Goaltender, Kingston Frontenacs
- Sheldon Keefe, Coach, Sault Ste. Marie Greyhounds

=== Second team ===
- Dylan Strome, Centre, Erie Otters
- Tyler Bertuzzi, Left Wing, Guelph Storm
- Alex DeBrincat, Right Wing, Erie Otters
- Darnell Nurse, Defence, Sault Ste. Marie Greyhounds
- Rasmus Andersson, Defence, Barrie Colts
- Ken Appleby, Goaltender, Oshawa Generals
- Jeff Brown, Coach, Ottawa 67's

=== Third team ===
- Joseph Blandisi, Centre, Barrie Colts
- Michael Dal Colle, Left Wing, Oshawa Generals
- Sergey Tolchinsky, Right Wing, Sault Ste. Marie Greyhounds
- Jakob Chychrun, Defence, Sarnia Sting
- Jordan Subban, Defence, Belleville Bulls
- Alex Nedeljkovic, Goaltender, Plymouth Whalers
- D. J. Smith, Coach, Oshawa Generals

== 2015 OHL priority selection ==
On April 11, 2015, the OHL conducted the 2015 Ontario Hockey League priority selection. The Sudbury Wolves held the first overall pick in the draft, and selected David Levin from the Don Mills Flyers of the GTHL. Levin was awarded the Jack Ferguson Award, awarded to the top pick in the draft.

Below are the players who were selected in the first round of the 2015 Ontario Hockey League priority selection.

#	Player	Nationality	OHL team	Hometown	Minor team
1	David Levin (RW)	Israel	Sudbury Wolves	North York, Ontario	Don Mills Flyers
2	Gabriel Vilardi (C)	Canada	Windsor Spitfires	Kingston, Ontario	CIH Academy
3	Ryan McLeod (C)	Canada	Flint Firebirds	Mississauga, Ontario	Toronto Marlboros
4	Owen Tippett (RW)	Canada	Mississauga Steelheads	Peterborough, Ontario	Toronto Red Wings
5	Zach Gallant (C)	Canada	Peterborough Petes	Oakville, Ontario	Mississauga Rebels
6	Brady Gilmour (C)	Canada	Saginaw Spirit	Grafton, Ontario	Quinte Red Devils
7	Ben Jones (C)	Canada	Niagara IceDogs	Waterloo, Ontario	Toronto Marlboros
8	Matthew Strome (LW)	Canada	Hamilton Bulldogs	Mississauga, Ontario	Toronto Marlboros
9	Markus Phillips (D)	Canada	Owen Sound Attack	Toronto, Ontario	Toronto Titans
10	Sasha Chmelevski (C)	United States	Sarnia Sting	Northville, Michigan	Detroit HoneyBaked 16U
11	Robbie Burt (RW)	Canada	Kingston Frontenacs	Erin, Ontario	Mississauga Rebels
12	Greg Meireles (C)	Canada	Kitchener Rangers	Ottawa, Ontario	Ottawa Jr. 67's
13	Hayden Davis (D)	Canada	Niagara IceDogs	Hamilton, Ontario	Hamilton Huskies
14	Nick Suzuki (C)	Canada	Owen Sound Attack	London, Ontario	London Jr. Knights
15	Isaac Ratcliffe (LW)	Canada	Guelph Storm	London, Ontario	London Jr. Knights
16	Austen Keating (C)	Canada	Ottawa 67's	Guelph, Ontario	Guelph Gryphons
17	Evan Bouchard (D)	Canada	London Knights	Burlington, Ontario	Oakville Rangers
18	Brady Lyle (D)	Canada	North Bay Battalion	North Bay, Ontario	Shattuck-St. Mary's 16U
19	Jacob Tortora (LW)	United States	Barrie Colts	Victor, New York	Don Mills Flyers
20	Ivan Lodnia (RW)	United States	Erie Otters	Novi, Michigan	Detroit HoneyBaked 16U
21	Jack Studnicka (C)	Canada	Oshawa Generals	Northville, Michigan	Detroit Belle Tire 16U
22	Liam Hawel (C)	Canada	Sault Ste. Marie Greyhounds	Arnprior, Ontario	Ottawa Valley Titans

== 2015 NHL entry draft ==
On June 26–27, 2015, the National Hockey League conducted the 2015 NHL entry draft held at the BB&T Center in Sunrise, Florida. In total, 31 players from the Ontario Hockey League were selected in the draft. Connor McDavid of the Erie Otters was the first player from the OHL to be selected, as he was taken with the first overall pick by the Edmonton Oilers.

Below are the players selected from OHL teams at the NHL Entry Draft.

Round	#	Player	Nationality	NHL team	Hometown	OHL team
1	1	Connor McDavid (C)	Canada	Edmonton Oilers	Newmarket, Ontario	Erie Otters
1	3	Dylan Strome (C)	Canada	Arizona Coyotes	Mississauga, Ontario	Erie Otters
1	4	Mitch Marner (RW)	Canada	Toronto Maple Leafs	Thornhill, Ontario	London Knights
1	6	Pavel Zacha (C)	Czech Republic	New Jersey Devils	Brno, Czech Republic	Sarnia Sting
1	11	Lawson Crouse (LW)	Canada	Florida Panthers	Mount Brydges, Ontario	Kingston Frontenacs
1	15	Zachary Senyshyn (RW)	Canada	Boston Bruins	Ottawa, Ontario	Sault Ste. Marie Greyhounds
1	24	Travis Konecny (RW)	Canada	Philadelphia Flyers	Clachan, Ontario	Ottawa 67's
2	33	Mitchell Stephens (C)	Canada	Tampa Bay Lightning	Peterborough, Ontario	Saginaw Spirit
2	34	Travis Dermott (D)	Canada	Toronto Maple Leafs	Newmarket, Ontario	Erie Otters
2	42	Mackenzie Blackwood (G)	Canada	New Jersey Devils	Thunder Bay, Ontario	Barrie Colts
2	44	Matthew Spencer (D)	Canada	Tampa Bay Lightning	Oakville, Ontario	Peterborough Petes
2	53	Rasmus Andersson (D)	Sweden	Calgary Flames	Malmö, Sweden	Barrie Colts
2	54	Graham Knott (LW)	Canada	Chicago Blackhawks	Holland Landing, Ontario	Niagara IceDogs
2	56	Vince Dunn (D)	Canada	St. Louis Blues	Lindsay, Ontario	Niagara IceDogs
3	63	Kyle Capobianco (D)	Canada	Arizona Coyotes	Mississauga, Ontario	Sudbury Wolves
3	67	Blake Speers (RW)	Canada	New Jersey Devils	Sault Ste. Marie, Ontario	Sault Ste. Marie Greyhounds
3	72	Anthony Cirelli (C)	Canada	Tampa Bay Lightning	Woodbridge, Ontario	Oshawa Generals
3	82	Mitchell Vande Sompel (D)	Canada	New York Islanders	London, Ontario	Oshawa Generals
3	88	Thomas Schemitsch (D)	Canada	Florida Panthers	Thornhill, Ontario	Owen Sound Attack
4	97	Colton White (D)	Canada	New Jersey Devils	London, Ontario	Sault Ste. Marie Greyhounds
4	103	Chris Martenet (D)	United States	Dallas Stars	St. Louis, Missouri	London Knights
5	134	Matt Schmalz (RW)	Canada	Los Angeles Kings	Dunnville, Ontario	Sudbury Wolves
6	155	Stephen Desrocher (D)	Canada	Toronto Maple Leafs	Toronto, Ontario	Oshawa Generals
6	164	Roy Radke (RW)	United States	Chicago Blackhawks	Geneva, Illinois	Barrie Colts
6	166	Andrew Mangiapane (C)	Canada	Calgary Flames	Bolton, Ontario	Barrie Colts
6	176	Liam Dunda (LW)	Canada	St. Louis Blues	Grimsby, Ontario	Owen Sound Attack
7	185	Nikita Korostelev (RW)	Russia	Toronto Maple Leafs	Moscow, Russia	Sarnia Sting
7	186	Steven Lorentz (C)	Canada	Carolina Hurricanes	Waterloo, Ontario	Peterborough Petes
7	196	Riley Bruce (D)	Canada	Calgary Flames	Carp, Ontario	North Bay Battalion
7	201	Gustav Bouramman (D)	Sweden	Minnesota Wild	Stockholm, Sweden	Sault Ste. Marie Greyhounds
7	207	Jeremiah Addison (RW)	Canada	Montreal Canadiens	Brampton, Ontario	Ottawa 67's

== 2015 CHL import draft ==
On June 30, 2015, the Canadian Hockey League conducted the 2015 CHL Import Draft, in which teams in all three CHL leagues participate in. The Sudbury Wolves held the first pick in the draft by a team in the OHL, and selected Dmitry Sokolov from Russia with their selection.

Below are the players who were selected in the first round by Ontario Hockey League teams in the 2015 CHL Import Draft.

#	Player	Nationality	OHL team	Hometown	Last team
3	Dmitry Sokolov (RW)	Russia	Sudbury Wolves	Omsk, Russia	Omsk Yastreby
6	Mikhail Sergachev (D)	Russia	Windsor Spitfires	Nizhnekamsk, Russia	Kazan Irbis
9	Vili Saarijarvi (D)	Finland	Flint Firebirds	Rovaniemi, Finland	Green Bay Gamblers
12	Alexander Nylander (C)	Sweden	Mississauga Steelheads	Stockholm, Sweden	AIK IF Jr. 18
15	Jonne Tammela (LW)	Finland	Peterborough Petes	Ylivieska, Finland	KalPa
18	Markus Niemelainen (D)	Finland	Saginaw Spirit	Kuopio, Finland	HPK Jr.
21	Ondrej Kachyna (D)	Czech Republic	Hamilton Bulldogs	Hodonín, Czech Republic	HC Ceske Budejovice Jr. B
24	Patrik Laine (RW)	Finland	Sarnia Sting	Tampere, Finland	Tappara
27	Konstantin Chernyuk (D)	Russia	Kingston Frontenacs	Saint Petersburg, Russia	Wichita Falls Wildcats
30	No selection made		Kitchener Rangers		
33	David Kase (C/LW)	Czech Republic	Niagara IceDogs	Kadaň, Czech Republic	Pirati Chomutov
36	No selection made		Owen Sound Attack		
39	Timo Haussener (C/RW)	Switzerland	Guelph Storm	Rapperswil-Jona, Switzerland	SC Rapperswill-Jona E Jr.
42	Stepan Falkovsky (D)	Belarus	Ottawa 67's	Minsk, Belarus	Yunost Minsk
45	Olli Juolevi (D)	Finland	London Knights	Helsinki, Finland	Jokerit Jr.
48	Max Kislinger (LW)	Germany	North Bay Battalion	Garmisch-Partenkirchen, Germany	EC Red Bull Salzburg U20
51	Julius Nattinen (C)	Finland	Barrie Colts	Jyväskylä, Finland	JYP
54	Erik Cernak (D)	Slovakia	Erie Otters	Košice, Slovakia	HC Kosice
56	Lukas Lofquist (RW)	Sweden	Oshawa Generals	Stockholm, Sweden	Djurgårdens IF Jr.
58	Makar Tokarev (LW)	Russia	Sault Ste. Marie Greyhounds	Magnitogorsk, Russia	Magnitogorsk Stalnye Lisy

Preceded by 2013–14 OHL season	OHL seasons	Succeeded by 2015–16 OHL season
