= Nick Moutrey =

Canadian professional ice hockey player

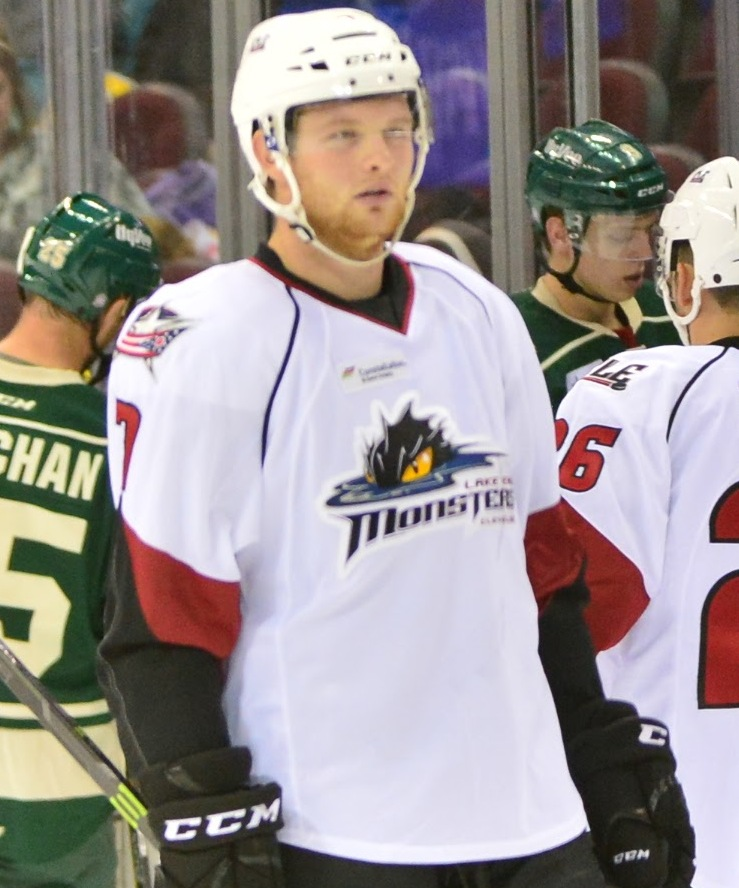
- Moutrey with the Lake Erie Monsters in 2015
- Born: June 24, 1995 (age 31) Toronto, Ontario, Canada
- Height: 6 ft 3 in (191 cm)
- Weight: 207 lb (94 kg; 14 st 11 lb)
- Position: Center
- Shoots: Left
- Ligue Magnus team Former teams: Ducs d'Angers; Cleveland Monsters; Belleville Senators; Rockford IceHogs; Texas Stars; Ässät; Rungsted Seier Capital
- NHL draft: 105th overall, 2013; Columbus Blue Jackets
- Playing career: 2015–present

Nick Moutrey (born June 24, 1995) is a Canadian professional ice hockey forward who currently plays for Les Ducs d'Angers in the Ligue Magnus.

== Playing career ==
Moutrey played major junior hockey in the Ontario Hockey League (OHL) with the Saginaw Spirit and the North Bay Battalion. He was selected by the Columbus Blue Jackets in the fourth-round, 105th overall, of the 2013 NHL entry draft.

He was signed to a three-year, entry-level contract with the Blue Jackets on March 6, 2015. He made his professional debut in the 2015-16 season, assigned to the Blue Jackets American Hockey League affiliate, the Lake Erie Monsters, appearing in 56 regular season games and posting 11 points, before making two playoff appearances in helping the Monsters to claim the Calder Cup.

In his final season of his entry-level contract in the 2017–18 season, unable to make his debut with the Blue Jackets, Moutrey was traded to the Ottawa Senators along with a third-round selection in 2018 in exchange for Ian Cole on February 27, 2018. He was immediately assigned to the Senators AHL affiliate, the Belleville Senators, for the remainder of the season.

Following stints with the Rockford IceHogs and the Texas Stars, Moutrey left North America following 283 AHL games and signed his first European contract in agreeing to a one-year deal with Finnish top-tier club, Ässät of the Liiga, on August 25, 2021.

Despite ice time, Moutrey knows little production during his stint in Finland and signs a year later in Denmark's top club Rungsted Seier Capital. There, he scores 16 points in 18 games but suffer a season ending injury. After a second stint in scandinavia, Moutrey signs with les Ducs d'Angers in the Ligue Magnus on august 14, 2023.

== Career statistics ==
			Regular season					Playoffs
Season	Team	League	GP	G	A	Pts	PIM	GP	G	A	Pts	PIM
2011–12	Saginaw Spirit	OHL	66	2	7	9	46	12	0	0	0	4
2012–13	Saginaw Spirit	OHL	65	16	27	43	44	4	0	0	0	12
2013–14	Saginaw Spirit	OHL	68	15	26	41	82	5	0	3	3	2
2014–15	Saginaw Spirit	OHL	36	15	25	40	40	—	—	—	—	—
2014–15	North Bay Battalion	OHL	26	10	12	22	14	15	7	6	13	12
2015–16	Lake Erie Monsters	AHL	53	6	5	11	39	2	0	0	0	2
2016–17	Cleveland Monsters	AHL	61	8	9	17	42	—	—	—	—	—
2017–18	Cleveland Monsters	AHL	22	3	3	6	6	—	—	—	—	—
2017–18	Belleville Senators	AHL	16	2	3	5	4	—	—	—	—	—
2018–19	Manchester Monarchs	ECHL	12	4	8	12	2	—	—	—	—	—
2018–19	Rockford IceHogs	AHL	49	1	4	5	22	—	—	—	—	—
2019–20	Rockford IceHogs	AHL	52	5	6	11	33	—	—	—	—	—
2020–21	Texas Stars	AHL	30	3	2	5	19	—	—	—	—	—
2021–22	Porin Ässät	Liiga	57	9	8	17	43	—	—	—	—	—
2022–23	Rungsted Seier Capital	Metal Ligaen	18	7	9	16	14	—	—	—	—	—
2023–24	Ducs d'Angers	Ligue Magnus	3	3	1	4	2
AHL totals			361	47	50	97	236	2	0	0	0	2

== Awards and honours ==
Awards	Year
AHL
Calder Cup (Lake Erie Monsters)	2016
