= Cole Cassels =

American ice hockey player (born 1995)

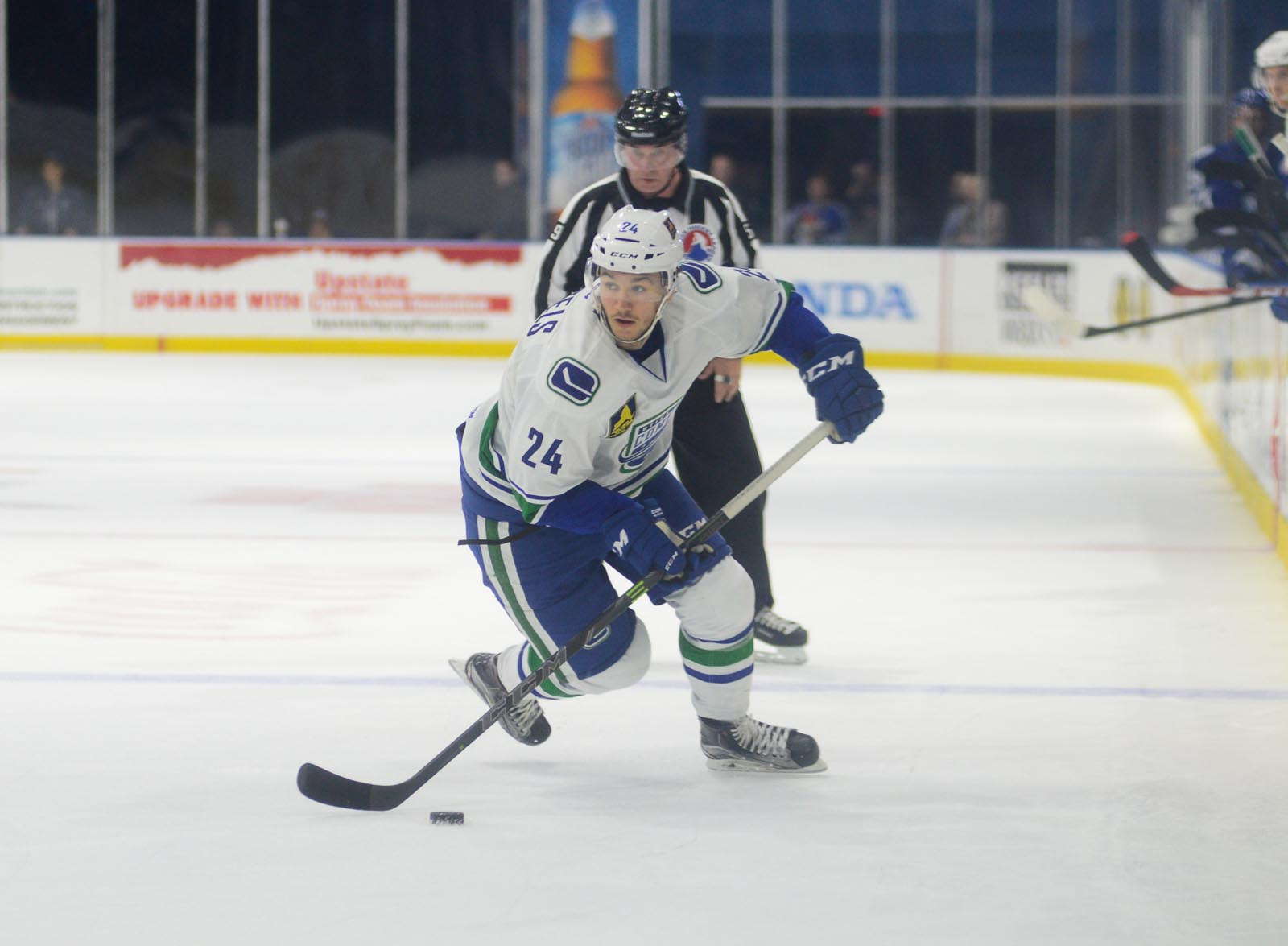
- Cassels with the Utica Comets in 2015
- Born: May 4, 1995 (age 31) Hartford, Connecticut, U.S.
- Height: 6 ft 0 in (183 cm)
- Weight: 179 lb (81 kg; 12 st 11 lb)
- Position: Centre
- Shoots: Right
- Slovak team Former teams: HKM Zvolen; Utica Comets; Grizzlys Wolfsburg; Belleville Senators; WBS Penguins; Cleveland Monsters; Södertälje SK; San Jose Barracuda; Avangard Omsk; CSKA Moscow
- NHL draft: 85th overall, 2013; Vancouver Canucks
- Playing career: 2015–present

Cole Cassels (born May 4, 1995) is an American professional ice hockey centre who plays for HKM Zvolen of the Slovak Extraliga.

== Playing career ==
With early years spent with the Ohio AAA Blue Jackets, he played junior ice hockey for the Oshawa Generals, winning the Memorial Cup with the team in 2015. He was selected by the Vancouver Canucks in the third round (85th overall) in 2013. He signed an entry-level contract with the Canucks in 2013.

At the conclusion of his rookie contract with the Canucks having played exclusively with American Hockey League affiliate, the Utica Comets, Cassels was not tendered a qualifying offer by the Canucks and was free to pursue free agency on June 25, 2018.

On July 31, 2018, Cassels signed his first contract abroad, agreeing to a one-year deal with German outfit, Grizzlys Wolfsburg of the DEL. In his only season with the Grizzlys in 2018–19, Cassels registered 23 points through 50 games, before leaving at the conclusion of the regular season as a free agent on March 8, 2019.

Approaching the 2019–20 season, he returned to the AHL in attending the Belleville Senators training camp. Upon his release from Belleville, Cassels resumed his North American career, agreeing to a contract with the Utah Grizzlies of the ECHL on October 2, 2019. He played 7 games with the Grizzlies, amassing 10 points before he returned to Belleville on a professional tryout contract on November 1, 2019. Cassels made 24 appearances with Belleville, contributing with 3 goals and 8 points, before leaving for fellow AHL club, the Wilkes-Barre/Scranton Penguins in securing an AHL contract for the remainder of the season on January 4, 2020.

At the conclusion of his contract with the Penguins, Cassels as a free agent opted to continue within the Senators organization, returning to Belleville on a one-year AHL contract on October 29, 2020.

On July 30, 2021, Cassels extended his career in the AHL, agreeing to a one-year contract with the Cleveland Monsters, affiliate to the Columbus Blue Jackets.

As a free agent from the Monsters organization, Cassels left for Europe for the second time in his career, agreeing to a one-year contract with Swedish club, Södertälje SK of the HockeyAllsvenskan on July 26, 2022. Cassels registered just 2 assists through 13 games to start the 2022–23 season with Södertälje SK, before opting to leave Sweden and return to the AHL in signing a one-year contract for a second stint with the Belleville Senators on November 2, 2022.

On September 12, 2023, Cassels continued his career in the AHL by moving as a free agent to the San Jose Barracuda on a one-year contract. In the 2023–24 season, Cassels was amongst the Barracuda's offensive leaders in posting 11 goals and 45 points through 67 regular season games as the club missed out on the post-season.

At the conclusion of his contract with the Barracuda, Cassels opted to leave the AHL in securing a one-year contract with Russian club, Avangard Omsk of the Kontinental Hockey League (KHL), on May 16, 2024. Registering just 5 points through 33 games in the 2024–25 season with Avangard, Cassels was traded to HC CSKA Moscow in exchange for Konstantin Okulov on December 25, 2024. He played out the remainder of the season with CSKA, before opting for a mutual release from the remaining year of his contract on July 29, 2025.

== Personal life ==
Cassels is the son of former NHL player Andrew Cassels. Cole spent most of his childhood living in Dublin, Ohio. He was born in Hartford, when his father was a member of the Hartford Whalers.

== Career statistics ==
=== Regular season and playoffs ===
			Regular season					Playoffs
Season	Team	League	GP	G	A	Pts	PIM	GP	G	A	Pts	PIM
2011–12	Oshawa Generals	OHL	64	3	8	11	31	6	1	0	1	6
2012–13	Oshawa Generals	OHL	64	15	28	43	51	9	1	0	1	14
2013–14	Oshawa Generals	OHL	61	24	49	73	90	12	6	11	17	16
2014–15	Oshawa Generals	OHL	54	30	51	81	100	16	6	13	19	12
2015–16	Utica Comets	AHL	67	2	5	7	24	4	1	0	1	0
2016–17	Utica Comets	AHL	66	6	5	11	33	—	—	—	—	—
2017–18	Utica Comets	AHL	69	7	19	26	70	5	2	1	3	2
2018–19	Grizzlys Wolfsburg	DEL	50	7	16	23	44	—	—	—	—	—
2019–20	Utah Grizzlies	ECHL	7	2	8	10	8	—	—	—	—	—
2019–20	Belleville Senators	AHL	24	3	5	8	10	—	—	—	—	—
2019–20	Wilkes-Barre/Scranton Penguins	AHL	28	6	13	19	10	—	—	—	—	—
2020–21	Belleville Senators	AHL	31	5	12	17	26	—	—	—	—	—
2021–22	Cleveland Monsters	AHL	70	6	19	25	56	—	—	—	—	—
2022–23	Södertälje SK	Allsv	13	0	2	2	31	—	—	—	—	—
2022–23	Belleville Senators	AHL	64	12	39	51	35	—	—	—	—	—
2023–24	San Jose Barracuda	AHL	67	11	34	45	30	—	—	—	—	—
2024–25	Avangard Omsk	KHL	33	2	3	5	2	—	—	—	—	—
2024–25	CSKA Moscow	KHL	23	0	6	6	0	2	0	1	1	0
AHL totals			486	58	151	209	294	9	3	1	4	2
KHL totals			56	2	9	11	2	2	0	1	1	0

=== International ===
Year	Team	Event	Result	GP	G	A	Pts	PIM
2012	Canada Ontario	U17	3rd place, bronze medalist(s)	6	1	2	3	6
Junior totals				6	1	2	3	6
