= Mitchell Vande Sompel =

Canadian ice hockey player (born 1997)

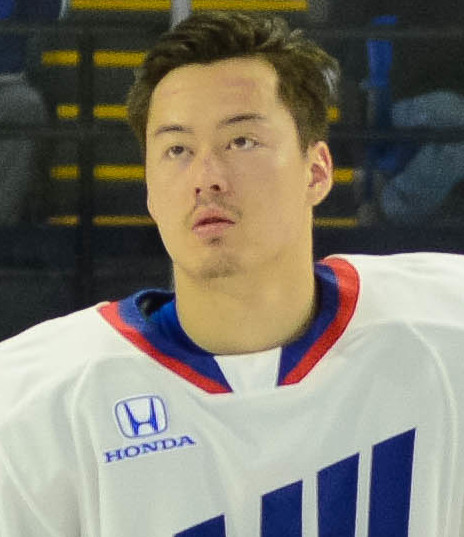
- Born: February 11, 1997 (age 29) London, Ontario, Canada
- Height: 5 ft 11 in (180 cm)
- Weight: 190 lb (86 kg; 13 st 8 lb)
- Position: Defence
- Shoots: Left
- AHL team Former teams: Charlotte Checkers; Bridgeport Islanders; Colorado Eagles; Chicago Wolves
- NHL draft: 82nd overall, 2015; New York Islanders
- Playing career: 2017–present

Mitchell Vande Sompel (born February 11, 1997) is a Canadian professional ice hockey defenceman for the Charlotte Checkers in the American Hockey League (AHL). He was selected by the New York Islanders, 82nd overall, in the 2015 NHL entry draft.

== Playing career ==
=== Junior ===
Vande Sompel played as a youth within the London Jr. Knights program and the London Nationals of the Greater Ontario Junior Hockey League (GOJHL) before he was selected 14th overall in the 2013 OHL Priority Selection by the Oshawa Generals. He made an immediate impact playing major junior in the Ontario Hockey League with the Generals in the 2013–14 season, earning a place in the First All-Rookie Team after contributing offensively from the blueline with 5 goals and 20 assists through 47 regular season games.

In the 2014–15 season, Vande Sompel assuming the top-pairing role with the Generals, recorded his career highs with 51 assists and 63 points through just 58 regular season games. In the post-season he helped Oshawa win the 2015 OHL title and Memorial Cup championship.

Off the back of his successful season, Vande Sompel was selected in the third-round, 82nd overall, by the New York Islanders of the 2015 NHL entry draft. He was later signed to a three-year, entry-level contact with the Islanders on October 12, 2016.

During his fourth and final junior season, Vande Sompel was traded by the Generals to his hometown London Knights midway through the 2016–17 season. He totalled 20 goals through 67 regular season games, which ranked second among OHL defensemen.

=== Professional ===
Embarking on his professional career, Vande Sompel was reassigned following training camp with the New York Islanders to AHL affiliate, the Bridgeport Sound Tigers, to begin the 2017–18 season. After registering an assist in his professional debut against the Binghamton Devils on October 7, 2017, Vande Sompel quickly adapted to the AHL and impressively led all Sound Tigers defenceman with 22 assist and co-led with 29 points. As a rookie he also represented Bridgeport at the 2018 AHL All-Star Classic, scoring three goals, tied for most out of any player.

Vande Sompel continued to grow in his development the following season, solidifying his role on the blueline with the Sound Tigers in recording 10 goals and a career high 31 points through 70 regular season games.

Entering his final season of his entry-level contract, Vande Sompel suffered an arm injury during training camp with the Islanders, ruling him out for the entirety of the 2019–20 season.

He was re-signed as a restricted free agent by the Islanders to a two-year contract extension on October 28, 2020. In suffering a setback through his injury, Vande Sompel struggled making his return during the pandemic-shortened 2020–21 season with no just 5 assists with a -19 rating in 20 games.

Entering his fifth season within the Islanders organization, Vande Sompel continuing in the AHL slowly regained his confidence and finished the season 18 points through 56 regular season games.

As a free agent from the Islanders, Vande Sompel having been unable to secure another NHL contract, was signed to a one-year AHL contract with the Colorado Eagles, primary affiliate to the Colorado Avalanche, on July 21, 2022. In the 2022–23 season, Vande Sompel used in a utility role featured in 47 regular season games, posting 5 goals and 15 assists for 20 points.

As a free agent, Vande Sompel left the Eagles and opted to sign a one-year contract with the lone AHL independent club, the Chicago Wolves, on July 18, 2023. In the 2023–24 season, Vande Sompel regressed offensively, posting 2 goals and 7 points in 31 regular season appearances with the Wolves. On March 8, 2024, Vande Sompel was traded by Chicago to the Charlotte Checkers in exchange for Jake Wise.

In the following off-season, Vande Sompel was re-signed by the Checkers to a two-year contract extension on June 5, 2024.

== Personal life ==
Vande Sompel is the cousin of Buffalo Sabres defenceman Jacob Bryson.

== Career statistics ==
=== Regular season and playoffs ===
			Regular season					Playoffs
Season	Team	League	GP	G	A	Pts	PIM	GP	G	A	Pts	PIM
2012–13	London Nationals	GOJHL	2	0	1	1	0	—	—	—	—	—
2013–14	Oshawa Generals	OHL	47	5	15	20	18	12	1	2	3	0
2014–15	Oshawa Generals	OHL	58	12	51	63	38	21	5	9	14	4
2015–16	Oshawa Generals	OHL	46	10	28	38	36	5	1	3	4	8
2016–17	Oshawa Generals	OHL	37	17	20	37	35	—	—	—	—	—
2016–17	London Knights	OHL	30	3	13	16	0	14	1	5	6	2
2017–18	Bridgeport Sound Tigers	AHL	58	7	22	29	36	—	—	—	—	—
2018–19	Bridgeport Sound Tigers	AHL	70	10	21	31	28	5	0	0	0	4
2020–21	Bridgeport Sound Tigers	AHL	20	0	5	5	8	—	—	—	—	—
2021–22	Bridgeport Islanders	AHL	56	2	16	18	20	6	0	0	0	4
2022–23	Colorado Eagles	AHL	47	5	15	20	38	7	0	3	3	2
2023–24	Chicago Wolves	AHL	31	2	5	7	4	—	—	—	—	—
2023–24	Charlotte Checkers	AHL	16	3	3	6	4	3	0	1	1	0
2024–25	Charlotte Checkers	AHL	13	0	2	2	0	—	—	—	—	—
2025–26	Charlotte Checkers	AHL	36	4	7	11	17	—	—	—	—	—
AHL totals			347	33	96	129	155	21	0	4	4	10

=== International ===
Year	Team	Event	Result	GP	G	A	Pts	PIM
2014	Canada Ontario	U17	5th	5	1	1	2	4
2014	Canada	IH18	1st place, gold medalist(s)	4	1	1	2	0
Junior totals				9	2	2	4	4

== Awards and honours ==
Award	Year
OHL
First All-Rookie Team	2014
J. Ross Robertson Trophy	2015
CHL
Memorial Cup (Oshawa Generals)	2015
AHL
All-Star Game	2018
