= Michael Dal Colle =

Canadian ice hockey player (born 1996)

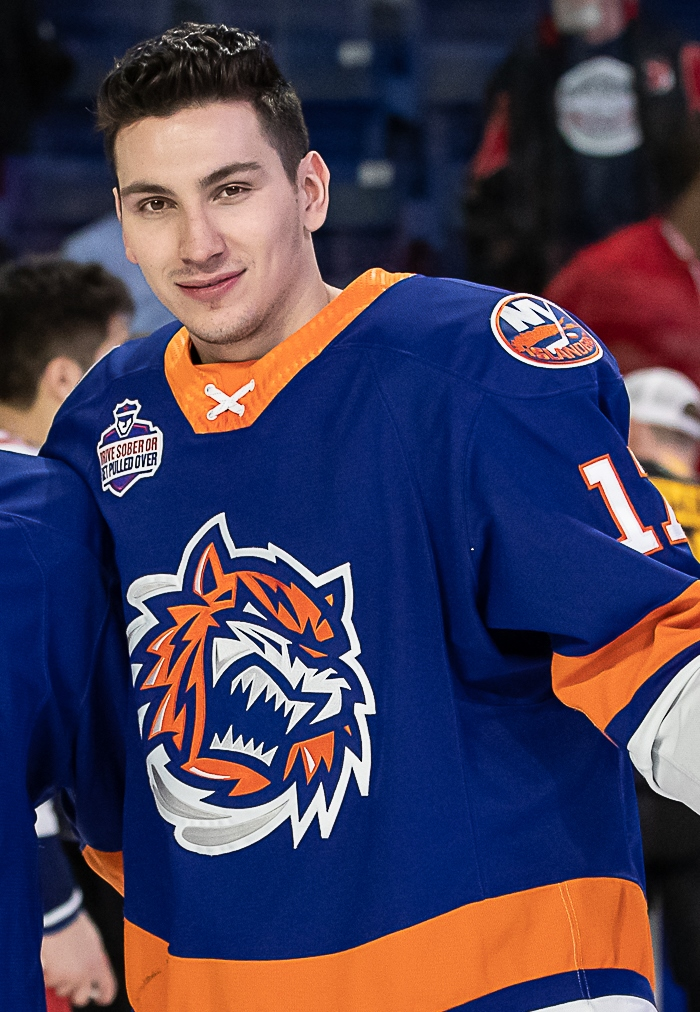
- Dal Colle with the Bridgeport Sound Tigers in 2019
- Born: June 20, 1996 (age 30) Richmond Hill, Ontario, Canada
- Height: 6 ft 3 in (191 cm)
- Weight: 195 lb (88 kg; 13 st 13 lb)
- Position: Left wing
- Shoots: Left
- ICEHL team Former teams: Milano HC; New York Islanders; HC TPS; Iserlohn Roosters; Dinamo Minsk
- NHL draft: 5th overall, 2014; New York Islanders
- Playing career: 2016–present

Michael Dal Colle (born June 20, 1996) is a Canadian professional ice hockey player who is currently under contract with Milano HC in the ICE Hockey League (ICEHL). Dal Colle was selected by the New York Islanders in the first round (fifth overall) of the 2014 NHL entry draft. Dal Colle was born in Richmond Hill, Ontario, but grew up in Vaughan, Ontario.

== Playing career ==
Dal Colle was selected seventh overall in the 2012 OHL Priority Selection by the Oshawa Generals. He was rated as a top prospect prior to the 2014 NHL entry draft.

Dal Colle was recognized for his outstanding performance during the 2012–13 season when he was named to the OHL First All-Rookie Team. He also won a gold medal with Team Canada at the 2013 Ivan Hlinka Memorial Tournament.

On September 28, 2014, the Islanders announced that they had signed Dal Colle to a three-year entry-level contract. On January 1, 2016, Oshawa traded Dal Colle to the Kingston Frontenacs in exchange for Robbie Burt and four draft picks. At the conclusion of the OHL season, Dal Colle joined the Bridgeport Sound Tigers, the Islanders American Hockey League (AHL) affiliate.

Dal Colle began the 2017–18 season with the Sound Tigers after being cut from the Islanders training camp. Dal Colle was called up from the Sound Tigers on January 11 and made his NHL debut with the Islanders on January 13, 2018, against the New York Rangers.

Dal Colle attended the Islanders training camp prior to the 2018–19 season but was reassigned to the Sound Tigers. On January 3, 2019, Dal Colle and teammate Sebastian Aho were selected to represent the Sound Tigers at the AHL All-Star Classic. On January 17, 2019, Dal Colle scored his first NHL goal in a 4–1 Islanders' victory over the New Jersey Devils. He was reassigned to the Sound Tigers shortly thereafter only to be recalled again on an emergency basis on March 5, 2019. In his first game back, Dal Colle recorded an assist off Devon Toews' goal to help the Islanders win 5–4 over the Ottawa Senators. On March 8, Dal Colle's emergency recall status was changed to a regular recall. The Islanders re-signed Dal Colle on September 21, 2021.

After the 2021–22 season, Dal Colle was not re-signed by the Islanders, making him an unrestricted free agent. On September 15, 2022, Dal Colle signed a professional try-out with the Ottawa Senators. He was released from the tryout on October 1, 2022. With his options in North America limited, Dal Colle embarked on a career abroad, signing a one-year contract with Finnish club, HC TPS of the Liiga, on October 16, 2022. In the 2022–23 season, Dal Colle made 36 regular season appearances with TPS, adapting to the European size rink with 4 goals and 15 assists for 19 points.

Leaving TPS at the conclusion of the season, Dal Colle continued his career in Europe by signing a one-year contract with Iserlohn Roosters of the Deutsche Eishockey Liga (DEL), on July 27, 2023.

Dal Colle enjoyed two seasons in the DEL with the Roosters before leaving at the conclusion of his contract to sign a two-year deal with Belarusian club, HC Dinamo Minsk of the Kontinental Hockey League, on August 22, 2025. Dal Colle made just 7 appearances with Minsk in the 2025–26 season before leaving the club by mutual consent at the mid-p[oint of the campaign.

As a free agent, Dal Colle resumed playing in the following season by agreeing to a one-year contract with newly formed Milano HC of the ICE Hockey League on June 19, 2026.

== Personal life ==
Dal Colle was raised in Vaughan, Ontario as the youngest of three children to Gus and Wendy Dal Colle, having an older brother, Jonluca, who is autistic, and a sister, Daniela, who played hockey at Niagara University. Dal Colle is of Italian descent from his paternal side, with his grandparents, Bruno and Gilda, emigrating from Verona, while his mother is of Irish descent.

== Career statistics ==
=== Regular season and playoffs ===
			Regular season					Playoffs
Season	Team	League	GP	G	A	Pts	PIM	GP	G	A	Pts	PIM
2011–12	St. Michael's Buzzers	OJHL	4	0	0	0	4	1	0	0	0	0
2012–13	Oshawa Generals	OHL	63	15	33	48	18	9	2	3	5	6
2013–14	Oshawa Generals	OHL	67	39	56	95	34	12	8	12	20	0
2014–15	Oshawa Generals	OHL	56	42	51	93	18	21	8	23	31	2
2015–16	Oshawa Generals	OHL	30	8	17	25	10	—	—	—	—	—
2015–16	Kingston Frontenacs	OHL	30	27	28	55	16	9	6	12	18	2
2015–16	Bridgeport Sound Tigers	AHL	3	0	0	0	0	3	0	1	1	0
2016–17	Bridgeport Sound Tigers	AHL	75	15	26	41	37	—	—	—	—	—
2017–18	Bridgeport Sound Tigers	AHL	60	7	17	24	26	—	—	—	—	—
2017–18	New York Islanders	NHL	4	0	0	0	0	—	—	—	—	—
2018–19	Bridgeport Sound Tigers	AHL	34	18	16	34	20	—	—	—	—	—
2018–19	New York Islanders	NHL	28	3	4	7	2	1	0	0	0	0
2019–20	New York Islanders	NHL	53	4	6	10	12	3	0	0	0	0
2020–21	New York Islanders	NHL	26	1	3	4	4	—	—	—	—	—
2021–22	Bridgeport Islanders	AHL	39	9	13	22	8	6	2	1	3	0
2021–22	New York Islanders	NHL	1	0	0	0	0	—	—	—	—	—
2022–23	HC TPS	Liiga	36	4	15	19	14	—	—	—	—	—
2023–24	Iserlohn Roosters	DEL	50	16	29	45	10	—	—	—	—	—
2024–25	Iserlohn Roosters	DEL	47	13	25	38	12	—	—	—	—	—
2025–26	Dinamo Minsk	KHL	7	1	0	1	0	—	—	—	—	—
NHL totals			112	8	13	21	18	4	0	0	0	0

=== International ===
Year	Team	Event	Result	GP	G	A	Pts	PIM
2013	Canada Ontario	U17	6th	5	2	4	6	0
2013	Canada	IH18	1st place, gold medalist(s)	5	2	2	4	4
Junior totals				10	4	6	10	4

== Awards and honours ==
Medal record

Representing Canada

Men's ice hockey

Ivan Hlinka Memorial Tournament
Gold medal – first place	2013 Czech Republic/Slovakia	

Award	Year
OHL
First All-Rookie Team	2012–13
Second All-Star Team	2013–14
Memorial Cup	2015
AHL
AHL All-Star Classic	2019
International
Ivan Hlinka Memorial Tournament gold medal	2013

Awards and achievements
Preceded by Ryan Pulock	New York Islanders first round pick 2014	Succeeded by Josh Ho-Sang
