= Nicholas Baptiste =

Canadian ice hockey player (born 1995)

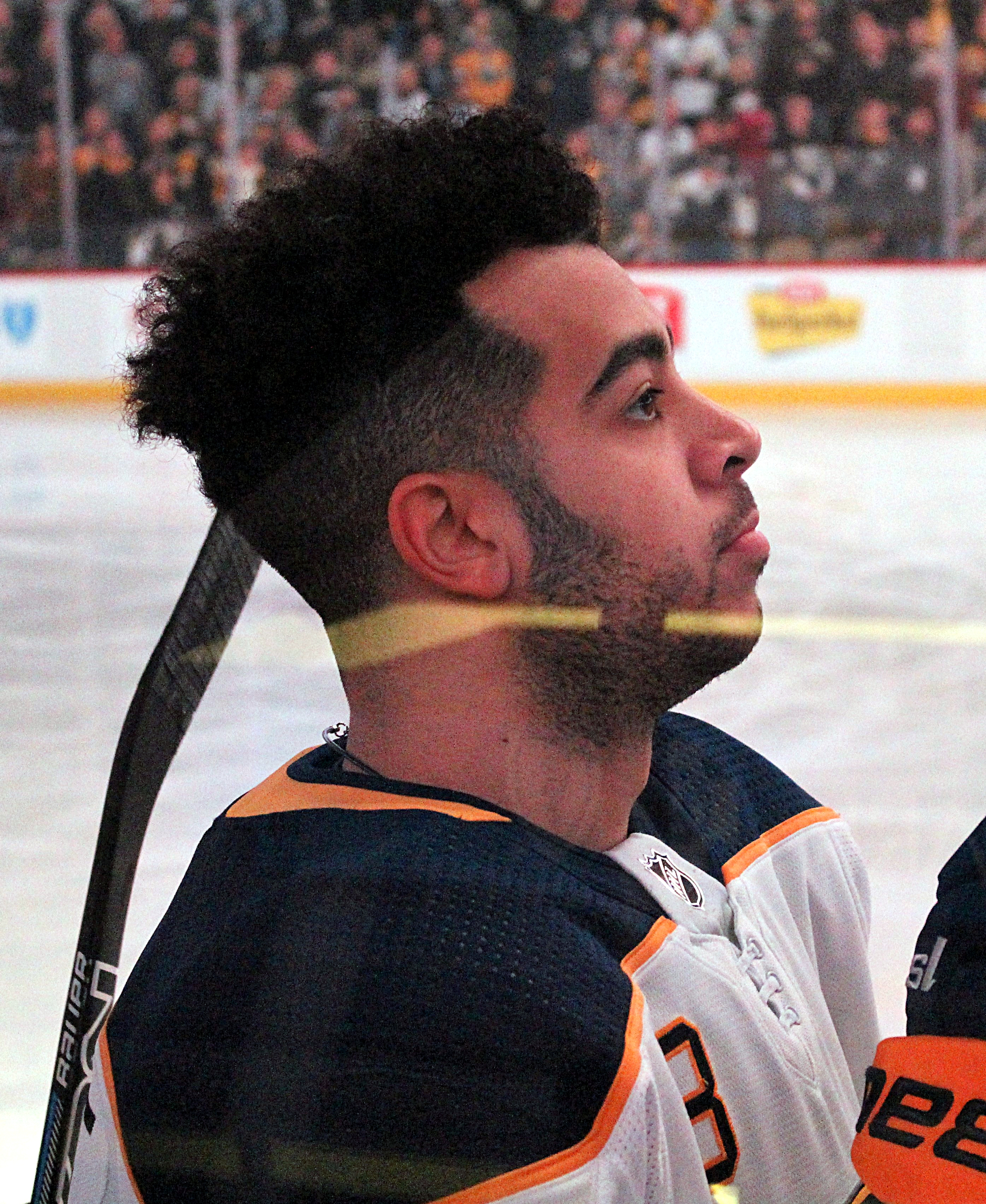
- Baptiste with the Buffalo Sabres in 2017
- Born: August 4, 1995 (age 31) Ottawa, Ontario, Canada
- Height: 6 ft 1 in (185 cm)
- Weight: 205 lb (93 kg; 14 st 9 lb)
- Position: Right wing
- Shoots: Right
- DEL2 team Former teams: Düsseldorfer EG; Buffalo Sabres; Milwaukee Admirals; Toronto Marlies; Belleville Senators; Texas Stars; Ilves; Kölner Haie; Tappara; HC Vityaz; Augsburger Panther; HK Dukla Trencin; HK Dukla Michalovce
- NHL draft: 69th overall, 2013; Buffalo Sabres
- Playing career: 2015–present

Nicholas Baptiste (born August 4, 1995) is a Haitian-Canadian professional ice hockey forward who currently plays for Düsseldorfer EG of DEL2. Baptiste was drafted by the Buffalo Sabres in the third round (69th overall) of the 2013 NHL entry draft.

== Early life ==
Baptiste was born on August 4, 1995, in Ottawa, Ontario, Canada to parents Ralph Baptiste and Michele Emond. His father, coming from Haiti, had limited knowledge of hockey and bought Baptiste his first pair of skates for $2.99 from the Salvation Army. Baptiste began ice skating at the age of six and joined his first hockey team the following year.

== Playing career ==
=== Minor ===
Baptiste joined a house league hockey team at the age of eight and began playing competitive hockey shortly after. He played for the Ottawa Ambassadors Novice 'AAA' Spring team. By the age of 12, he began being approached and recruited by scouts and agents. During this time, he also played football and soccer but eventually chose to focus on hockey. Baptiste played minor midget hockey with the Ottawa Senators of the Ottawa District Minor Hockey Association and won their Player of the Year Award in 2011 for his "outstanding ability and the qualities of sportsmanship and leadership." While attending St. Joseph Catholic High School, Baptiste played in the Ontario East Minor Hockey League (OEMHL) and was chosen to compete with the Under-16 Ontario team at the Canada Winter Games in Halifax. During the tournament, he drew the attention of Sudbury Wolves head scout Norm Robert but suffering a season-ending injury. He thus finished the OEMHL regular season with 55 points in 24 games.

=== Major junior ===
Baptiste was drafted in the first round, sixth overall, by the Sudbury Wolves of the Ontario Hockey League (OHL) during the 2011 OHL Entry Draft. In his first season with the team, Baptiste competed in 68 regular-season games and finished with 8 goals with 19 assists. In December 2011, Baptiste was chosen to skate for Canada Ontario in the 2012 World U-17 Hockey Challenge and helped them win a bronze medal.

Baptiste returned to the Wolves for his sophomore season and became the third-leading scorer for the team with 21 goals with 27 assists in 66 games. Baptiste was again chosen to compete for Team Canada at the 2013 IIHF World U18 Championships where he helped the team win a gold medal by recording two assists in the gold medla game. He and Morgan Klimchuk were tied behind Connor McDavid for second in scoring for Canada at the tournament, with both scoring three goals and five assists. Upon concluding his sophomore season with the Wolves, Baptiste was given the final ranking of 61 amongst North American Skaters by the NHL Central Scouting Bureau prior to the 2013 NHL entry draft. He was eventually drafted in the third-round, 69th overall, by the Buffalo Sabres.

In his third OHL season, Baptiste was named an assistant captain alongside Mathew Campagna and Jeff Corbett for the 2013–14 campaign. He led the Wolves in scoring with 45 goals and 44 assists in 65 regular-season games and signed a three-year entry-level contract with the Sabres on May 31, 2014. As a result of his play, Baptiste was named the Eastern Conference's Best Shootout Skater in the Ontario Hockey League's Coaches Poll and finished second to Andreas Athanasiou as the best skater in the conference.

Baptiste returned to the Wolves for his fourth and final season as co-captain for the team alongside Brody Silk. He skated in 12 games for the team before being traded to the Erie Otters on November 24, 2014, in exchange for Travis Wood, Cole Mayo, and four draft picks. In 53 regular-season games between the two teams, he scored 32 goals with 32 assists and had 26 penalty minutes.

=== Professional ===
Upon concluding his major junior career, Baptiste joined the Rochester Americans of the American Hockey League (AHL) for their 2015–16 season.

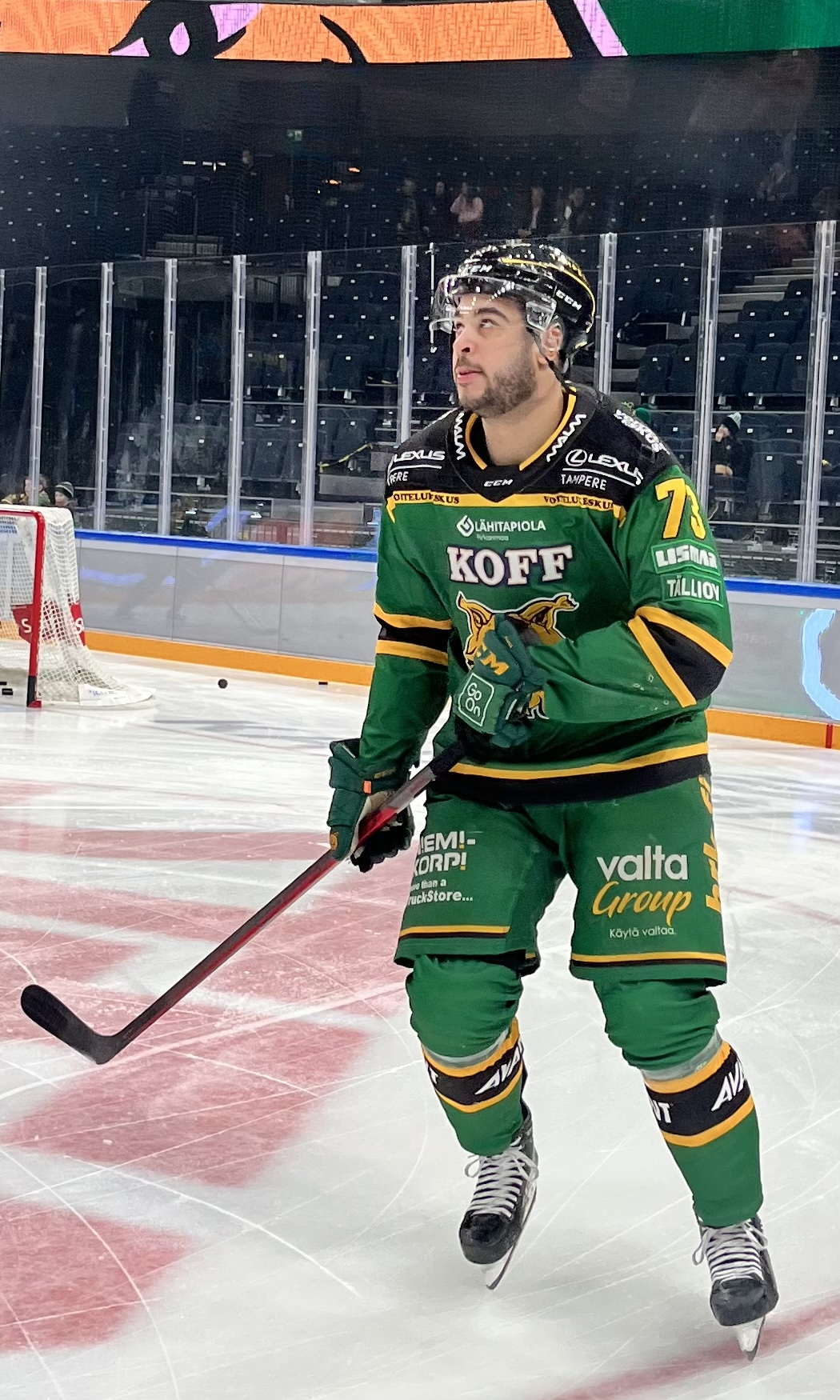
Baptiste with Ilves in 2022

Following his rookie season, Baptiste was invited by the Sabres to participate in their Prospects Challenge in September, during which he scored a hat-trick. As a result, Sabres coach Dan Bylsma said that Baptiste is "a good possibility" to make his NHL debut at some point during the team's three-game road trip in Western Canada. Baptiste was also invited to the Sabres training camp prior to the 2016–17 season but was unable to finish due to a back injury suffered during a preseason game against the Toronto Maple Leafs. He was medically cleared to play for the Americans opening night game. Following injuries to Evander Kane and Jack Eichel, Baptiste earned his first NHL call up on October 16, 2016 and made his debut against the Calgary Flames on October 18, 2016. He recorded his first career NHL goal the following game, in a 2–1 loss to the Vancouver Canucks. Although Baptiste was awarded the goal, he was not the one to shoot it into the net. There was a misplay between two Canucks players leading the puck to go into the net and since Baptiste was the last Sabres player to touch it, he was awarded his first NHL goal. Upon rejoining the Americans, Baptiste recorded his first professional regular season hat-trick in a 5–2 win over the Toronto Marlies on December 15.

In this third and final season with the Sabres, Baptiste skated in a career-high 33 NHL games with the Sabres during the year and recorded six points. He re-signed with the Sabres on July 18, 2018.

On October 1, 2018, before the 2018–19 season, Baptiste was traded to the Nashville Predators in exchange for Jack Dougherty. He was immediately reassigned to join AHL affiliate, the Milwaukee Admirals. Baptiste remained with the Admirals, scoring 10 goals and 20 points in 54 games before he was traded for the second time within the season, dealt by the Predators to the Toronto Maple Leafs in exchange for future considerations on February 24, 2019. He was assigned directly to the Maple Leafs AHL affiliate, the Toronto Marlies, playing out the remainder of the season to collect 2 goals and 7 points in 18 games.

With his contract with the Maple Leafs concluded, Baptiste as a free agent opted to continue within the organization, signing a one-year AHL contract with the Marlies on August 15, 2019. In the 2019–20 season, Baptiste recorded just 3 goals in 29 games with the Marlies before he was traded to the Belleville Senators in exchange for Miles Gendron on February 24, 2020.

As a free agent from the Senators, Baptiste continued his tenure in the AHL, signing a one-year AHL contract with the Texas Stars on January 23, 2021. Following the signing, Baptiste was named an alternate captain alongside Josh Melnick and captain Cole Schneider for the 2020–21 season. In the shortened season, Baptiste registered 12 goals and 24 points through 34 regular season games for Texas.

As a free agent, Baptiste opted to sign his first contract abroad, agreeing to a one-year deal with Finnish club, Ilves Tampere, of the Liiga, on July 21, 2021. In the 2021–22 season, Baptiste quickly adapted to the European style, contributing with 21 goals and 35 points in 52 regular season games. He notched 5 goals in the playoffs, helping Ilves reach the semi-finals.

On July 4, 2022, Baptiste left Finland after agreeing to a one-year contract with German club, Kölner Haie of the Deutsche Eishockey Liga (DEL), for the 2022–23 season. In his lone season in Germany, Baptiste contributed offensively with 14 goals and 34 points through 46 regular season games.

As a free agent Baptiste opted to leave the DEL and return to the Finnish Liiga, agreeing to a one-year contract with Tappara on June 22, 2023.

After a successful season with Tappara, Baptiste left at the conclusion of his contract and continued his career abroad in agreeing to a one-year deal with Russian club, Vityaz Moscow Region of the KHL, on May 29, 2024.

== Career statistics ==
=== Regular season and playoffs ===
			Regular season					Playoffs
Season	Team	League	GP	G	A	Pts	PIM	GP	G	A	Pts	PIM
2011–12	Sudbury Wolves	OHL	64	8	19	27	42	4	0	0	0	2
2012–13	Sudbury Wolves	OHL	66	21	27	48	44	9	3	1	4	6
2013–14	Sudbury Wolves	OHL	65	45	44	89	59	5	1	4	5	8
2014–15	Sudbury Wolves	OHL	12	6	5	11	8	—	—	—	—	—
2014–15	Erie Otters	OHL	41	26	27	53	18	20	12	11	23	10
2015–16	Rochester Americans	AHL	62	13	15	28	30	—	—	—	—	—
2016–17	Rochester Americans	AHL	59	25	16	41	34	—	—	—	—	—
2016–17	Buffalo Sabres	NHL	14	3	1	4	6	—	—	—	—	—
2017–18	Buffalo Sabres	NHL	33	4	2	6	14	—	—	—	—	—
2017–18	Rochester Americans	AHL	36	7	11	18	22	3	1	0	1	2
2018–19	Milwaukee Admirals	AHL	55	12	10	22	14	—	—	—	—	—
2018–19	Toronto Marlies	AHL	18	2	5	7	6	13	1	0	1	2
2019–20	Toronto Marlies	AHL	29	3	6	9	8	—	—	—	—	—
2019–20	Belleville Senators	AHL	6	1	1	2	2	—	—	—	—	—
2020–21	Texas Stars	AHL	34	12	12	24	18	—	—	—	—	—
2021–22	Ilves	Liiga	52	21	14	35	41	13	5	0	5	2
2022–23	Kölner Haie	DEL	46	14	20	34	24	6	3	1	4	4
2023–24	Tappara	Liiga	50	14	13	27	26	16	2	4	6	10
2024–25	HC Vityaz	KHL	11	2	1	3	6	—	—	—	—	—
2024–25	Augsburger Panther	DEL	20	8	3	11	8	—	—	—	—	—
NHL totals			47	7	3	10	20	—	—	—	—	—
Liiga totals			102	35	27	62	67	29	7	4	11	12

=== International ===
Year	Team	Event	Result	GP	G	A	Pts	PIM
2012	Canada Ontario	U17	3rd place, bronze medalist(s)	6	1	3	4	2
2013	Canada	U18	1st place, gold medalist(s)	7	3	5	8	4
Junior totals				13	4	8	12	6
