= Remi Elie =

Canadian ice hockey player (born 1995)

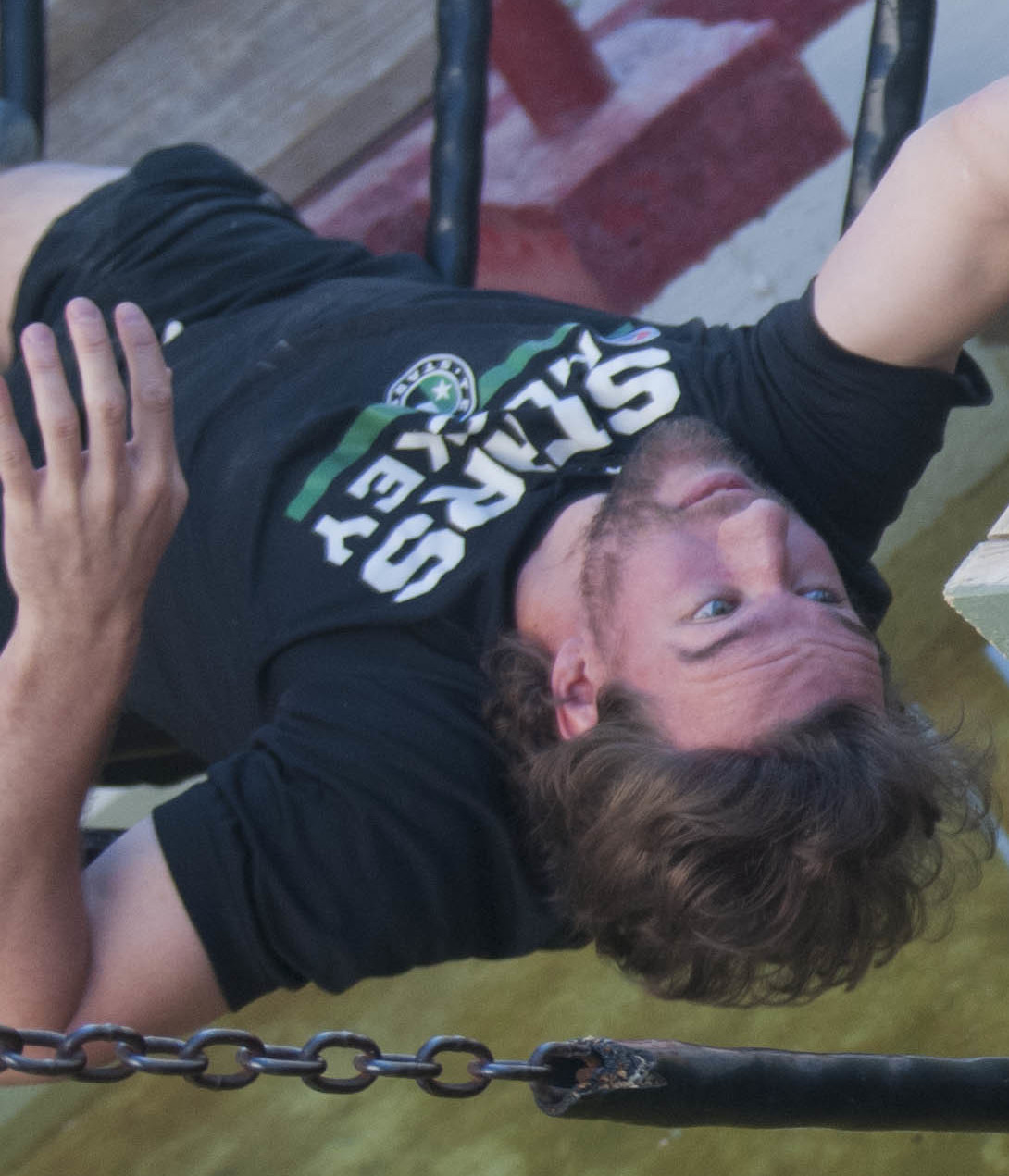
- Elie with the Texas Stars in 2015
- Born: April 16, 1995 (age 31) Green Valley, Ontario, Canada
- Height: 6 ft 1 in (185 cm)
- Weight: 203 lb (92 kg; 14 st 7 lb)
- Position: Left wing
- Shoots: Left
- SHL team Former teams: Linköping HC; Dallas Stars; Buffalo Sabres; Tampa Bay Lightning; Färjestad BK
- NHL draft: 40th overall, 2013; Dallas Stars
- Playing career: 2015–present

Remi Elie (born April 16, 1995) is a Canadian professional ice hockey forward who is currently playing for Linköping HC of the Swedish Hockey League (SHL). He was selected by the Dallas Stars in the 2nd round (40th overall) of the 2013 NHL entry draft.

== Playing career ==
Elie was drafted 91st overall by the London Knights of the Ontario Hockey League in the 2011 OHL Priority Selection. After two seasons with the Knights, Elie was traded to the Belleville Bulls in exchange for Brady Austin.

On September 28, 2014, the Dallas Stars, who drafted Elie in the 2013 NHL entry draft, announced they had signed him to a three-year entry-level contract. He proceeded to play with the Belleville Bulls for the 2014–15 season before joining the Erie Otters in a mid-season trade to conclude his junior career.

In the 2016–17 season, Elie, on his second NHL recall, made his NHL debut in the Stars 2-1 victory against the Florida Panthers on March 4, 2017. He scored his first NHL goal in a game against the San Jose Sharks on March 12, 2017. The following season, Elie, a restricted free agent, accepted the Stars qualifying offer of a one-year $735,000 contract for the 2018–19 season.

After participating at the Stars 2018–19 training camp, he was placed on waivers and claimed by the Buffalo Sabres. Elie served largely as a healthy scratch, appearing in 16 games with 1 assist before he was waived by the Sabres. Upon clearing, Elie was reassigned to AHL affiliate, the Rochester Americans on February 3, 2019.

On January 29, 2021, Elie as a free agent from the Sabres signed a one-year AHL contract to continue his tenure with the Rochester Americans. Elie enjoyed a successful shortened 2020–21 season with the Americans, appearing in 28 games and recording 10 goals and 19 points to lead the club in goals and was tied for second in points.

Elie secured an NHL contract as a free agent, agreeing to a one-year, two-way deal with back-to-back Stanley Cup champions the Tampa Bay Lightning on July 28, 2021.

== Career statistics ==
			Regular season					Playoffs
Season	Team	League	GP	G	A	Pts	PIM	GP	G	A	Pts	PIM
2011–12	Hawkesbury Hawks	CCHL	59	21	25	46	39	9	5	4	9	12
2012–13	London Knights	OHL	65	7	10	17	34	21	4	4	8	8
2013–14	London Knights	OHL	6	1	2	3	4	—	—	—	—	—
2013–14	Belleville Bulls	OHL	61	28	37	65	44	—	—	—	—	—
2014–15	Belleville Bulls	OHL	35	14	20	34	24	—	—	—	—	—
2014–15	Erie Otters	OHL	28	16	26	42	14	20	4	20	24	20
2015–16	Texas Stars	AHL	64	6	11	17	51	4	0	0	0	0
2016–17	Texas Stars	AHL	53	9	19	28	37	—	—	—	—	—
2016–17	Dallas Stars	NHL	18	1	6	7	8	—	—	—	—	—
2017–18	Texas Stars	AHL	4	1	0	1	6	19	2	7	9	10
2017–18	Dallas Stars	NHL	72	6	8	14	18	—	—	—	—	—
2018–19	Buffalo Sabres	NHL	16	0	1	1	2	—	—	—	—	—
2018–19	Rochester Americans	AHL	25	8	6	14	14	3	0	0	0	0
2019–20	Rochester Americans	AHL	34	8	5	13	10	—	—	—	—	—
2020–21	Rochester Americans	AHL	28	10	9	19	18	—	—	—	—	—
2021–22	Syracuse Crunch	AHL	48	17	12	29	23	5	3	0	3	2
2021–22	Tampa Bay Lightning	NHL	1	0	0	0	0	—	—	—	—	—
2022–23	Färjestad BK	SHL	32	6	12	18	20	5	0	1	1	2
2023–24	Linköping HC	SHL	49	10	16	26	24	4	0	0	0	6
2024–25	Linköping HC	SHL	49	15	11	26	55	—	—	—	—	—
NHL totals			107	7	15	22	28	—	—	—	—	—
