= Lucas Peressini =

Canadian ice hockey player

- Born: March 9, 1995 (age 31) Nobleton, Ontario, Canada
- Height: 6 ft 2 in (188 cm)
- Weight: 185 lb (84 kg; 13 st 3 lb)
- Position: Goaltender
- Catches: left
- team Former teams: Free agent Belleville Senators
- NHL draft: Undrafted
- Playing career: 2022–present

Lucas Peressini (born March 9, 1995) is a Canadian professional ice hockey goaltender. He is currently an unrestricted free agent who most recently played with the Allen Americans in the ECHL. Peressini played with the Western Mustangs of the OUA.

== Playing career ==
=== Kingston Frontenacs (2012–2016) ===
Originally a tenth-round draft pick of the Saginaw Spirit in 2011, Peressini was traded to Kingston the following year. Peressini made his Ontario Hockey League debut with the Kingston Frontenacs during the 2012-13 season, appearing in only one game, in which he allowed six goals on 38 shots in a 6–1 loss to the Oshawa Generals. He spent the majority of the 2011–12 season, however, in the OJHL with the Newmarket Hurricanes.

Peressini became the Frontenacs back up goaltender in 2013-14. He recorded his first career OHL victory on September 27, 2013, making 27 saves in a 5–1 victory over the Niagara IceDogs. In 25 games with the club, Peressini had a record of 11-4-4 with a 3.43 GAA and a .902 save percentage. In the post-season, Peressini went 0–1 with a 3.77 GAA and a .919 save percentage as the Frontenacs lost to the Peterborough Petes in the first round.

In 2014-15, Peressini was named the Frontenacs starting goaltender. On October 12, 2014, he made 31 saves in a 1–0 win to earn his first career OHL shutout. Peressini finished the regular season winning his last seven decisions, helping the Frontenacs into the post-season. Overall, Peressini had a 30-20-6 record with a 2.32 GAA and a .922 save percentage, and had five shutouts, to win the OHL Goaltender of the Year award, and was named to the OHL First All-Star Team. In the post-season, he struggled in four games, going 0–4 with a 3.96 GAA and a .884 save percentage, as the Frontenacs were swept by the North Bay Battalion.

Peressini returned to the Frontenacs for his overage season in 2015-16, as he put up a record of 27-14-4 with a 2.85 GAA and a .906 save percentage. On February 15, Peressini made 50 saves against the Barrie Colts, as Kingston won the game by a 6–4 score. Due to the emergence of backup goaltender Jeremy Helvig, Peressini began the post-season as the Frontenacs backup goaltender, however, he would regain his starters job midway in the second round. On March 29, Peressini earned his first career playoff victory, coming in relief for Helvig in the third period, and made 14 saves on 15 shots, as the Frontenacs defeated the Oshawa Generals 5–4. Overall in the playoffs, Peressini had a 1–4 record with a 3.09 GAA and a .902 save percentage.

=== University of Western Ontario (2016–2020) ===
Peressini joined the Western Mustangs of the OUA for the 2016–17 season. In his first game with the Mustangs on October 22, Peressini made 43 saves in a 4–1 loss to the Windsor Lancers. Peressini earned his first victory with Western on November 25, making 23 saves in a 6–3 win over the Laurentian Voyageurs.

== Career statistics ==
			Regular season									Playoffs
Season	Team	League	GP	W	L	T/OT	MIN	GA	SO	GAA	SV%	GP	W	L	MIN	GA	SO	GAA	SV%
2012–13	Kingston Frontenacs	OHL	1	0	1	0	60	6	0	6.00	.842	—	—	—	—	—	—	—	—
2013–14	Kingston Frontenacs	OHL	25	11	4	4	1260	72	0	3.43	.902	1	0	1	48	3	0	3.77	.919
2014–15	Kingston Frontenacs	OHL	59	30	20	6	3413	132	5	2.32	.922	4	0	4	212	14	0	3.96	.884
2015–16	Kingston Frontenacs	OHL	47	27	14	4	2672	127	1	2.85	.906	5	1	4	233	12	0	3.09	.902
2016–17	U. of Western Ontario	OUAA	9	1	6	0	450	35	0	4.67	.860	—	—	—	—	—	—	—	—
2017–18	U. of Western Ontario	OUAA	13	9	3	0	750	28	1	2.24	.929	3	—	—	—	—	—	3.12	.918
2018–19	U. of Western Ontario	OUAA	24	15	8	0	1413	55	1	2.34	.927	9	4	4	—	—	—	2.54	.918
2019–20	U. of Western Ontario	OUAA	20	6	14	0	1189	76	0	3.83	.893	9	4	4	—	—	—	2.49	.933
2021–22	Ryerson University	OUAA	4	4	0	0	244	8	0	1.97	.941	—	—	—	—	—	—	—	—
2021–22	Worcester Railers	ECHL	1	0	1	0	59	6	0	6.05	.800	—	—	—	—	—	—	—	—
2021–22	Allen Americans	ECHL	26	15	7	1	1341	67	0	3.00	.919	4	1	3	232	15	0	3.87	.914
2022–23	Allen Americans	ECHL	35	17	14	2	1997	122	0	3.67	.895	—	—	—	—	—	—	—	—
2022–23	Belleville Senators	AHL	1	0	1	0	13	3	0	14.10	.571	—	—	—	—	—	—	—	—
OHL totals			132	68	39	14	7405	337	6	2.73	.912	10	1	9	493	29	0	3.53	.896

== Awards and honours ==
Honours	Year
OHL First Team All Star	2014–15
OHL Goaltender of the Year	2014–15
