= Zachary Senyshyn =

Canadian ice hockey player (born 1997)

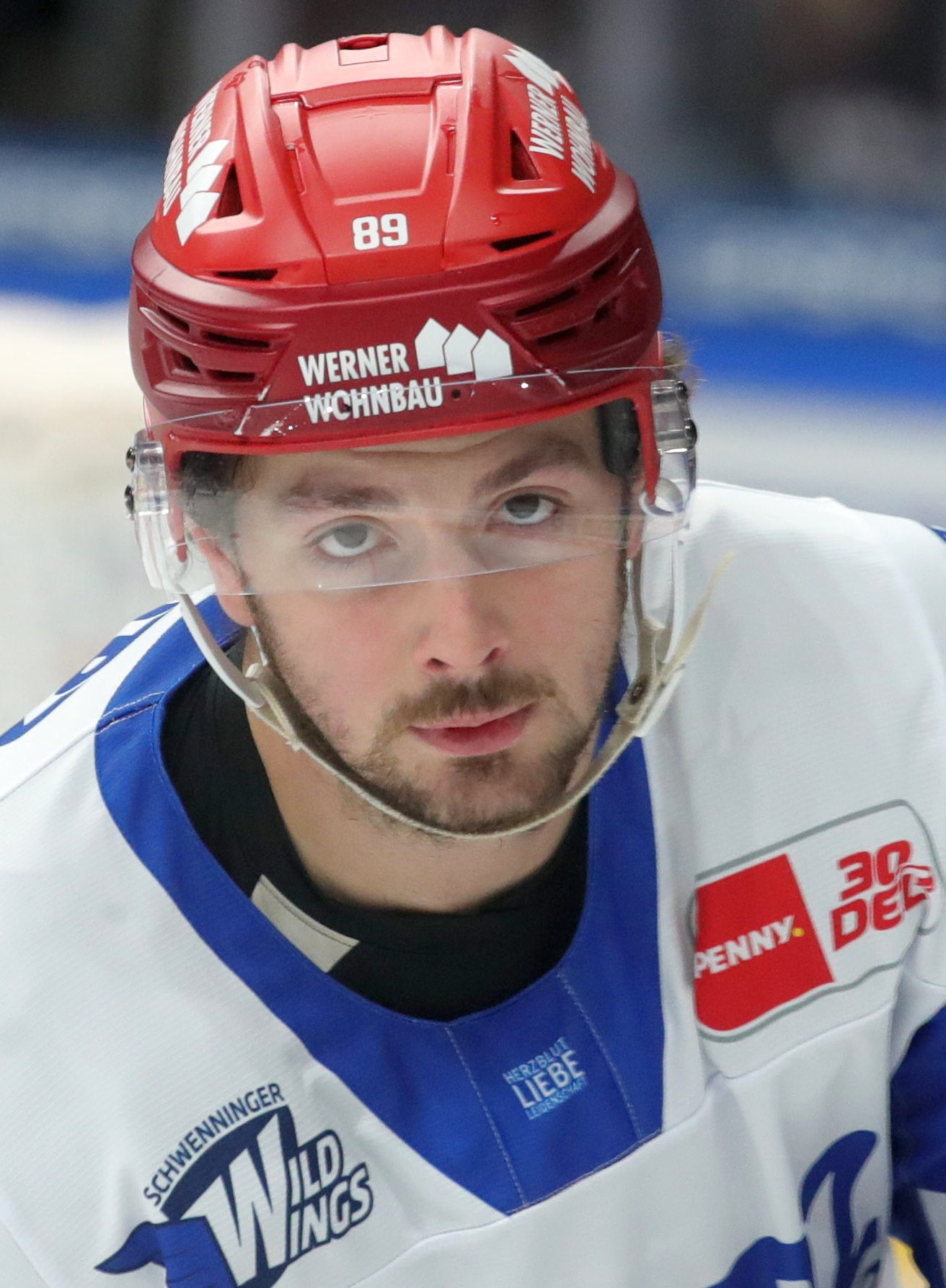
- Zachary Senyshyn playing for the Schwenninger Wild Wings in 2023
- Born: March 30, 1997 (age 29) Ottawa, Ontario, Canada
- Height: 6 ft 1 in (185 cm)
- Weight: 205 lb (93 kg; 14 st 9 lb)
- Position: Right wing
- Shoots: Right
- ELH team Former teams: HC Olomouc; Boston Bruins; Ottawa Senators; Schwenninger Wild Wings; Vlci Žilina
- NHL draft: 15th overall, 2015; Boston Bruins
- Playing career: 2017–present

Zachary Senyshyn (born March 30, 1997) is a Canadian professional ice hockey forward for HC Olomouc of the Czech Extraliga. Senyshyn was selected by the Boston Bruins in the first round (15th overall) of the 2015 NHL entry draft. He was born in Ottawa, Ontario.

== Playing career ==
Following the 2014–15 OHL season in which he scored 45 points in 65 games with the Sault Ste. Marie Greyhounds, Senyshyn was ranked number 38 by the NHL Central Scouting Bureau on their list of North American Skaters eligible for the 2015 NHL entry draft. Expected to be drafted in the middle of the second round, the Boston Bruins unexpectedly picked Senyshyn 15th overall with the pick acquired in exchange for Dougie Hamilton.

During the 2015–16 season, Senyshyn was signed to a three-year entry-level contract with the Boston Bruins on November 12, 2015. He was assigned to the Bruins American Hockey League (AHL) team, the Providence Bruins, in April 2017 to help them in their playoff run. Senyshyn then started the 2017–18 season with the Providence Bruins after being cut from Bruins training camp. Senyshyn was recalled on April 3, 2019, and played his first NHL game the following evening against the Minnesota Wild. He also scored his first NHL goal in that game, an empty net goal in a 3–0 Bruin win. He was sent back down to Providence on April 7.

On March 21, 2022, Senyshyn was traded by the Bruins, along with a 2022 fifth-round selection to the Ottawa Senators in exchange for Josh Brown and a conditional 2022 seventh-round draft pick. He was recalled by Ottawa from their AHL affiliate, the Belleville Senators, on April 17, 2022. He appeared in his first game for the Senators on April 20, 2022 versus the Seattle Kraken. He was re-assigned to Belleville on April 20.

A free agent at the end of the season, Senyshyn signed a professional tryout with the New Jersey Devils on September 14, 2022. Unable to crack the Devils lineup, Senyshyn signed a one-year contract to play with the AHL's Utica Comets in October 2022. In the 2022–23 season, Senyshyn appeared in 37 games with the Comets registering 6 goals and 9 points, before he was traded to the Chicago Wolves in exchange for future considerations on February 18, 2023.

As a free agent in the following off-season, Senyshyn was signed to his first European contract, agreeing to a one-year deal with German club, Schwenninger Wild Wings of the DEL, on July 16, 2023. After three years in the DEL, and a four game stint with Vlci Žilina of the Slovak Extraliga, Senyshyn signed a contract with HC Olomouc of the Czech Extraliga for the 2026–27 season.

== Career statistics ==
			Regular season					Playoffs
Season	Team	League	GP	G	A	Pts	PIM	GP	G	A	Pts	PIM
2013–14	Smiths Falls Bears	CCHL	57	22	10	32	8	16	4	6	10	0
2013–14	Sault Ste. Marie Greyhounds	OHL	4	1	1	2	0	—	—	—	—	—
2014–15	Sault Ste. Marie Greyhounds	OHL	66	26	19	45	17	14	4	3	7	2
2015–16	Sault Ste. Marie Greyhounds	OHL	66	45	20	65	20	12	2	7	9	6
2016–17	Sault Ste. Marie Greyhounds	OHL	59	42	23	65	31	11	4	1	5	8
2016–17	Providence Bruins	AHL	—	—	—	—	—	4	0	0	0	2
2017–18	Providence Bruins	AHL	66	12	14	26	14	4	0	1	1	0
2018–19	Providence Bruins	AHL	66	14	10	24	20	4	0	0	0	2
2018–19	Boston Bruins	NHL	2	1	0	1	0	—	—	—	—	—
2019–20	Providence Bruins	AHL	42	7	9	16	13	—	—	—	—	—
2019–20	Boston Bruins	NHL	4	0	2	2	0	—	—	—	—	—
2020–21	Boston Bruins	NHL	8	0	0	0	2	—	—	—	—	—
2020–21	Providence Bruins	AHL	18	7	6	13	4	—	—	—	—	—
2021–22	Providence Bruins	AHL	51	19	12	31	14	—	—	—	—	—
2021–22	Belleville Senators	AHL	16	0	3	3	6	—	—	—	—	—
2021–22	Ottawa Senators	NHL	2	0	0	0	2	—	—	—	—	—
2022–23	Utica Comets	AHL	37	6	3	9	20	—	—	—	—	—
2022–23	Chicago Wolves	AHL	25	4	5	9	6	—	—	—	—	—
2023–24	Schwenninger Wild Wings	DEL	51	13	18	31	10	7	1	1	2	0
2024–25	Schwenninger Wild Wings	DEL	52	27	10	37	2	3	1	0	1	0
2025–26	Schwenninger Wild Wings	DEL	31	10	5	15	2	—	—	—	—	—
2025–26	Vlci Žilina	Slovak	4	0	2	2	0	—	—	—	—	—
NHL totals			16	1	2	3	4	—	—	—	—	—
DEL totals			134	50	33	83	14	10	2	1	3	0
Slovak totals			4	0	2	2	0	—	—	—	—	—

== Awards and honours ==
Award	Year
OHL
Second All-Rookie Team	2015

Awards and achievements
Preceded by Jake DeBrusk	Boston Bruins first-round draft pick 2015	Succeeded by Charlie McAvoy
