= 2014 IIHF World U18 Championships =

2014 IIHF U18 World Championship

Tournament details
- Host country: Finland
- Venues: 2 (in 2 host cities)
- Dates: 17 – 27 April 2014
- Teams: 10

Final positions
- Champions: United States (8th title)
- Runners-up: Czech Republic
- Third place: Canada

Tournament statistics
- Scoring leader: (Sweden) William Nylander (16 points)

The 2014 IIHF U18 World Championship was the 16th IIHF World U18 Championship, and was hosted by Lappeenranta and Imatra, Finland. The tournament began on 17 April 2014, with the gold medal game played on 27 April 2014.

== Top Division ==
=== Officials ===
The IIHF selected 12 referees and 10 linesmen to work the 2014 IIHF U18 World Championship.
They were the following:

Referees

- (Latvia) Andris Ansons
- (United Kingdom) Michael Hicks
- (Czech Republic) Pavel Hodek
- (Finland) Mikko Kaukokari
- (Slovakia) Daniel Konc
- (United States) Geoffrey Miller
- (Canada) Kendrick Nicholson
- (Sweden) Linus Öhlund
- (Finland) Anssi Salonen
- (Germany) Gordon Schukies
- (Russia) Alexander Sergeyev
- (Switzerland) Tobias Wehrli

Linesmen

- (Canada) Jordan Browne
- (Denmark) René Jensen
- (Russia) Gleb Lazarev
- (Czech Republic) Miroslav Lhotský
- (Sweden) Andreas Malmqvist
- (United States) Dana Penkivech
- (Finland) Jani Pesonen
- (Germany) Nikolaj Ponomarjow
- (Norway) Alexander Waldejer
- (Japan) Sotaro Yamaguchi

=== Preliminary round ===
==== Group A ====
Pos	Team	Pld	W	OTW	OTL	L	GF	GA	GD	Pts	Qualification
1	Canada	4	3	0	1	0	12	7	+5	10	Quarterfinals
2	Sweden	4	2	1	0	1	20	11	+9	8	Quarterfinals
3	Russia	4	1	2	1	0	14	10	+4	8	Quarterfinals
4	Slovakia	4	1	0	1	2	9	12	−3	4	Quarterfinals
5	Germany	4	0	0	0	4	8	23	−15	0	Relegation round

Source: IIHF

All times are local. (Eastern European Summer Time – UTC+03)

17 April 2014; 16:00	Slovakia	2–3 OT (1–1, 1–1, 0–0) (OT 0–1)	Russia	Arena, Imatra; Attendance: 786

Game reference

Adam Húska
Goalies
Alexander Trushkov
Referees:
(Latvia) Andris Ansons
(Finland) Anssi Salonen
Linesmen:
(Denmark) René Jensen
(Norway) Alexander Waldejer

	0–1	15:44 – Y. Svechnikov (I. Nikolishin, N. Lyamkin)
P. Maier (M. Paločko) (PP) – 19:08	1–1
K. Pospíšil (SH) – 36:02	2–1
	2–2	37:20 – K. Pilipenko (V. Kamenev, D. Vovchenko) (PP)
	2–3	60:22 – K. Pilipenko (D. Vovchenko, N. Lyamkin) (PP)

12 min
Penalties
4 min
17
Shots
36

17 April 2014; 19:30	Sweden	1–3 (0–1, 1–1, 0–1)	Canada	Arena, Imatra; Attendance: 967

Game reference

Linus Söderström
Goalies
Mason McDonald
Referees:
(Finland) Mikko Kaukokari
(United States) Geoffrey Miller
Linesmen:
(United States) Dana Penkivech
(Finland) Jani Pesonen

	0–1	06:45 – J. Virtanen (R. McKeown)
	0–2	21:03 – J. Virtanen (PP)
D. Muzito Bagenda (A. Holmström) (PP) – 30:57	1–2
	1–3	43:07 – M. Barzal

26 min
Penalties
22 min
25
Shots
18

18 April 2014; 16:00	Germany	1–4 (1–1, 0–1, 0–2)	Slovakia	Arena, Imatra; Attendance: 968

Game reference

Florian Proske
Goalies
Matej Tomek
Referees:
(Russia) Alexander Sergeyev
(Switzerland) Tobian Wehrli
Linesmen:
(Russia) Gleb Lazarev
(Japan) Sotaro Yamaguchi

M. Wiederer (M. Kammerer) – 00:32	1–0
	1–1	17:50 – J. Milý
	1–2	34:22 – R. Bondra (J. Melisko)
	1–3	44:38 – K. Ferleťák (K. Pospíšil)
	1–4	59:50 – M. Paločko (J. Mily)

6 min
Penalties
12 min
24
Shots
18

19 April 2014; 16:00	Canada	5–2 (1–0, 1–2, 3–0)	Germany	Arena, Imatra; Attendance: 1,200

Game reference

Julio Billia
Goalies
Daniel Fiessinger
Referees:
(Czech Republic) Pavel Hodek
(Finland) Anssi Salonen
Linesmen:
(Sweden) Andreas Malmqvist
(Norway) Alexander Waldejer

D. Audette (J. Hawryluk, B. Thomas) – 06:37	1–0
	1–1	33:09 – A. Eder (M. Daubner, J. Mayenschein)
C. Bleakley (C. Bishop) – 34:29	2–1
	2–2	37:49 – M. Kammerer (S. Loibl, M. Wiederer)
R. Gropp (J. Virtanen) – 54:24	3–2
T. Konecny (B. Point, B. Perlini) – 56:18	4–2
J. McCann (J. Virtanen) – 59:25	5–2

4 min
Penalties
4 min
42
Shots
23

19 April 2014; 19:30	Russia	3–4 GWS (0–2, 0–1, 3–0) (OT 0–0) (SO: 0–1)	Sweden	Arena, Imatra; Attendance: 1,200

Game reference

Alexander Trushkov
Maxim Tretiak
Goalies
Linus Söderström
Referees:
(Canada) Kendrick Nicholson
(Switzerland) Tobias Wehrli
Linesmen:
(United States) Dana Penkivech
(Germany) Nikolaj Ponomarjow

	0–1	11:19 – O. Lindblom (W. Nylander)
	0–2	14:46 – G. Forsling (W. Nylander) (PP)
	0–3	27:25 – G. Forsling (O. Lindblom) (PP)
D. Vovchenko (I. Dervuk) – 42:48	1–3
S. Afonasievski – 49:02	2–3
V. Kamenev (N. Lyamkin, D. Vovchenko) (PP) – 52:05	3–3

Ivan Nikolishin (miss)
D. Vovchenko (miss)
Shootout
Adrian Kempe
W. Nylander
16 min
Penalties
12 min
18
Shots
30

20 April 2014; 16:00	Slovakia	1–2 (1–0, 0–1, 0–1)	Canada	Arena, Imatra; Attendance: 1,083

Game reference

Adam Húska
Goalies
Mason McDonald
Referees:
(United Kingdom) Michael Hicks
(Germany) Gordon Schukies
Linesmen:
(Denmark) René Jensen
(Germany) Nikolaj Ponomarjow

J. Milý (SH) – 12:24	1–0
	1–1	39:53 – B. Perlini (H. Fleury, T. Sanheim) (PP)
	1–2	53:23 – B. Perlini

18 min
Penalties
12 min
22
Shots
25

21 April 2014; 16:00	Russia	5–2 (3–2, 0–0, 2–0)	Germany	Arena, Imatra; Attendance: 1,183

Game reference

Maxim Tretiak
Alexander Trushkov
Goalies
Florian Proske
Referees:
(Finland) Mikko Kaukorai
(Slovakia) Daniel Konc
Linesmen:
(Sweden) Andreas Malmqvist
(United States) Dana Penkivech

Y. Svechnikov (V. Kamenev, N. Lyamkin) (PP) – 08:14	1–0
A. Protapovich (I. Nikolishin) – 09:22	2–0
	2–1	13:29 – S. Loibl (PP2)
	2–2	14:17 – M. Kammerer (K. Wissmann, A. Eder) (PP)
K. Pilipenko (N. Lyamkin, V. Kamenev) (PP) – 15:59	3–2
I. Nikolishin (A. Protapovich, Y. Svechnikov) – 45:44	4–2
Y. Svechnikov (I. Nikolishin, A. Sleptsov) (PP) – 48:32	5–2

22 min
Penalties
14 min
35
Shots
29

21 April 2014; 19:30	Sweden	6–2 (1–0, 3–1, 2–1)	Slovakia	Arena, Imatra; Attendance: 1,200

Game reference

Linus Söderström
Goalies
Matej Tomek
Referees:
(Czech Republic) Pavel Hodek
(Finland) Anssi Salonen
Linesmen:
(Finland) Jani Pesonen
(Japan) Sotaro Yamaguchi

G. Forsberg (W. Nylander, A. Kempe) (PP) – 08:14	1–0
W. Nylander (A. Holmström) – 25:44	2–0
	2–1	26:57 – C. Jaroš (M. Halama)
W. Nylander (A. Kempe) (PP2) – 28:57	3–1
A. Holmström (A. Ollas-Mattsson, W. Nylander) – 36:12	4–1
H. Törnqvist (R. Andersson) (SH) – 41:13	5–1
	5–2	45:27 – J. Milý
W. Nylander (A. Kempe, A. Holmström) (PP2) – 54:29	6–2

12 min
Penalties
43 min
33
Shots
19

22 April 2014; 16:00	Canada	2–3 GWS (0–0, 1–0, 1–2) (OT 0–0) (SO: 0–1)	Russia	Arena, Imatra; Attendance: 1200

Game reference

Mason McDonald
Goalies
Maxim Tretiak
Referees:
(Latvia) Andris Ansons
(United States) Geoffrey Miller
Linesmen:
(Czech Republic) Miroslav Lhotsky
(Finland) Jani Pesonen

T. Konecny (T. Sanheim) – 21:49	1–0
	1–1	40:27 – I. Nikolishin (R. Fazleyev)
M. Barzal (J. McCann, T. Sanheim) – 47:40	2–1
	2–2	59:25 – V. Kamenev (I. Nikolishin, A. Sleptsov) (PP)(EA)

Connor Bleackley (miss)
J. McCann (miss)
Jake Virtanen (miss)
Shootout
Kirill Pilipenko
(miss) V. Kamenev
10 min
Penalties
25 min
25
Shots
31

22 April 2014; 19:30	Germany	3–9 (0–3, 1–4, 2–2)	Sweden	Arena, Imatra; Attendance: 1200

Game reference

Florian Proske
Daniel Fiessinger
Goalies
Markus Olsson
Referees:
(United Kingdom) Michael Hicks
(Switzerland) Tobias Wehrli
Linesmen:
(Canada) Jordan Browne
(United States) Dana Penkivech

	0–1	07:06 – A. Holmström (O. Lindblom, A. Ollas-Mattsson)
	0–2	11:21 – S. Aho (G. Franzén, K. Rosdahl) (PP2)
	0–3	14:52 – O. Lindblom (W. Nylander, A. Holmström)
	0–4	25:05 – W. Lagesson (W. Nylander, A. Holmström)
	0–5	25:14 – H. Törnqvist (J. Forsbacka-Karlsson, K. Rosdahl)
M. Wiederer (M. Kammerer, K. Wissmann) (PP) – 31:01	1–5
	1–6	32:58 – S. Aho (G. Franzén) (PP)
	1–7	33:53 – R. Andersson (C. Ehn, K. Elgestål)
M. Kammerer (S. Loibl, C. Konopatzki) – 41:30	2–7
M. Wiederer (M. Todam, K. Wissmann) (PP) – 44:33	3–7
	3–8	45:23 – G. Forsling (W. Nylander, A. Kempe) (PP)
	3–9	50:30 – W. Nylander (A. Holmström, O. Lindblom)

10 min
Penalties
6 min
21
Shots
45

==== Group B ====
Pos	Team	Pld	W	OTW	OTL	L	GF	GA	GD	Pts	Qualification
1	United States	4	3	0	0	1	16	7	+9	9	Quarterfinals
2	Czech Republic	4	2	1	0	1	17	10	+7	8	Quarterfinals
3	Finland	4	2	0	1	1	14	10	+4	7	Quarterfinals
4	Switzerland	4	2	0	0	2	10	10	0	6	Quarterfinals
5	Denmark	4	0	0	0	4	5	25	−20	0	Relegation round

Source: IIHF

All times are local. (Eastern European Summer Time – UTC+03)

17 April 2014; 15:00	Switzerland	4–2 (1–2, 0–0, 3–0)	United States	Kisapuisto, Lappeenranta; Attendance: 726

Game reference

Gauthier Descloux
Goalies
Alexander Nedeljkovic
Referees:
(United Kingdom) Michael Hicks
(Canada) Kendrick Nicholson
Linesmen:
(Canada) Jordan Browne
(Czech Republic) Miroslav Lhotský

	0–1	05:13 – J. Dougherty (B. Fortunato, F. Milano) (PP)
D. Riat (J. Privet) – 11:55	1–1
	1–2	15:42 – K. Connor (N. Hanifin)
K. Fiala (D. Malgin, J. Siegenthaler) – 40:46	2–2
D. Malgin (K. Fiala) – 56:30	3–2
D. Malgin (ENG) – 59:49	4–2

16 min
Penalties
2 min
37
Shots
33

17 April 2014; 18:30	Denmark	1–6 (0–3, 1–2, 0–1)	Finland	Kisapuisto, Lappeenranta; Attendance: 1,942

Game reference

Thomas Lilie
Goalies
Kaapo Kahkonen
Referees:
(Czech Republic) Pavel Hodek
(Sweden) Linus Ohlund
Linesmen:
(Germany) Nikolaj Ponomarjow
(Japan) Sotaro Yamaguchi

	0–1	04:21 – S. Aho (A. Kalapudas)
	0–2	07:24 – M. Rantanen (Rouhiainen, J. Lammikko)
	0–3	08:26 – M. Rantanen (J. Lammikko, S. Moberg) (PP)
J. Korsgaard (S. Nielsen) – 21:36	1–3
	1–4	24:32 – S. Moberg (J. Lammikko)
	1–5	29:23 – M. Rantanen (SH)
	1–6	51:35 – K. Kapanen (M. Honkanen) (PP)

33 min
Penalties
10 min
11
Shots
41

18 April 2014; 18:30	Czech Republic	9–2 (4–0, 3–0, 2–2)	Denmark	Kisapuisto, Lappeenranta; Attendance: 204

Game reference

Vítek Vaněček
Goalies
Mathias Seldrup
Thomas Lilie
Referees:
(Germany) Daniel Konc
(Germany) Gordon Schukies
Linesmen:
(Sweden) Andreas Malmqvist
(Finland) Jani Pesonen

J. Vrána (D. Pastrňák, V. Karabáček) (PP) – 06:51	1–0
M. Špaček (J. Zbořil, P. Zacha) – 10:44	2–0
P. Zacha (V. Karabáček, M. Špaček) – 13:00	3–0
L. Vopelka (D. Mašín) – 15:11	4–0
F. Pyrochta (J. Ordoš, J. Černoch) – 22:14	5–0
A. Rasner (L. Vopelka, J. Vrána) – 31:34	6–0
V. Karabáček (M. Špaček, J. Zbořil) – 35:15	7–0
	7–1	42:34 – A. True (M. Klussmann, F. Hoeg)
J. Vrána (D. Pastrňák) – 46:45	8–1
V. Karabáček (P. Zacha, V. Vaněček) – 50:10	9–1
	9–2	59:28 – J. Korsgaard (M. Eskildsen)

2 min
Penalties
8 min
52
Shots
11

19 April 2014; 15:00	United States	3–0 (2–0, 1–0, 0–0)	Czech Republic	Kisapuisto, Lappeenranta; Attendance: 2,523

Game reference

Alexander Nedeljkovic
Goalies
Vítek Vaněček
Referees:
(Latvia) Andris Ansons
(Sweden) Linus Öhlund
Linesmen:
(Canada) Jordan Browne
(Russia) Gleb Lazarev

A. Matthews (J. Dougherty, B. Fortunato) – 08:17	1–0
S. Milano (J. Eichel, A. Tuch) – 20:58	2–0
K. Connor (J. Wegwerth, J. Glover) – 24:27	3–0

10 min
Penalties
6 min
35
Shots
24

19 April 2014; 18:30	Finland	2–1 (1–1, 0–0, 1–0)	Switzerland	Kisapuisto, Lappeenranta; Attendance: 4,133

Game reference

Kaapo Kahkonen
Goalies
Gauthier Descloux
Referees:
(Germany) Daniel Konc
(Russia) Alexander Sergeyev
Linesmen:
(Denmark) Rene Jensen
(Czech Republic) Miroslav Lhotsky

J. Lammikko (M. Rantanen) – 04:48	1–0
	1–1	10:01 – D. Malgin (K. Fiala, N. Rod)
S. Aho (W. Hopponen, J. Rouhiainen) – 49:04	2–1

14 min
Penalties
6 min
27
Shots
25

20 April 2014; 18:30	Denmark	0–7 (0–1, 0–2, 0–4)	United States	Kisapuisto, Lappeenranta; Attendance: 384

Game reference

Mathias Seldrup
Goalies
Edwin Minney
Referees:
(Finland) Mikko Kaukokari
(Switzerland) Tobias Wehrli
Linesmen:
(Czech Republic) Miroslav Lhotský
(Japan) Sotaro Yamaguchi

0–1	10:24 – S. Milano (J. Eichel)
0–2	31:47 – J. Fiegl (J. Wegwerth)
0–3	36:34 – J. Eichel (S. Milano, J. Glover)
0–4	42:41 – J. Glover (L. Belpedio, S. Milano)
0–5	45:28 – R. Hitchcock (A. Matthews)
0–6	52:49 – J. Eichel (B. Fortunato, J. Dougherty
0–7	53:05 – K. Connor (R. Hitchcock, N. Hanifin)

14 min
Penalties
6 min
8
Shots
59

21 April 2014; 15:00	Finland	3–4 GWS (0–0, 1–2, 2–1) (OT 0–0) (SO: 0–1)	Czech Republic	Kisapuisto, Lappeenranta; Attendance: 3,575

Game reference

Kaapo Kahkonen
Goalies
Vítek Vaněček
Referees:
(United States) Geoffrey Miller
(Canada) Kendrick Nicholson
Linesmen:
(Russia) Gleb lazarev
(Germany) Nikolaj Ponomarjow

A. Kalapudas (W. Hopponen, J. Parikka) – 23:59	1–0
	1–1	32:14 – J. Vrána (D. Kaše)
	1–2	32:51 – J. Šmejkal (F. Chlapík, R. Veselý)
J. Lammikko (M. Rantanen) – 48:20	2–2
	2–3	56:39 – V. Karabáček
S. Niku (A. Kalapudas, S. Aho) – 58:48	3–3

A. Kalapudas (miss)
Kasperi Kapanen (miss)
Shootout
J. Vrána
David Pastrňák
14 min
Penalties
10 min
32
Shots
37

21 April 2014; 18:30	Switzerland	3–2 (0–0, 2–1, 1–1)	Denmark	Kisapuisto, Lappeenranta; Attendance: 593

Game reference

Gauthier Descloux
Goalies
Thomas Lilie
Referees:
(Latvia) Andris Ansons
(Sweden) Linus Öhlund
Linesmen:
(Canada) Jordan Browne
(Norway) Alexander Waldejer

R. Karrer (K. Fiala, D. Malgin) (PP) – 30:34	1–0
K. Fiala (J. Siegenthaler, R. Karrer) – 34:23	2–0
	2–1	37:41 – T. Olsen (E. Christensen)
	2–2	55:46 – C. Mieritz (s. Nielsen) (PP)
N. Rod (K. Fiala, D. Malgin) – 57:50	3–2

6 min
Penalties
8 min
46
Shots
24

22 April 2014; 15:00	Czech Republic	4–2 (0–0, 1–0, 3–2)	Switzerland	Kisapuisto, Lappeenranta; Attendance: 587

Game reference

Vítek Vaněček
Goalies
Kevin Fehr
Referees:
(Slovakia) Daniel Konc
(Germany) Gordon Schukies
Linesmen:
(United States) Dana Penkivech
(Norway) Alexander Waldejer

J. Vrána (D. Mašín, F. Pyrochta) – 23:16	1–0
P. Zacha (V. Karabáček, D. Pastrňák) – 41:37	2–0
	2–1	44:28 – N. Rod (K. Fiala, R. Karrer)
P. Zacha (D. Pastrňák) – 45:33	3–1
	3–2	52:12 – K. Fiala (R. Karrer, N. Rod)
J. Šmejkal (D. Pastrňák) (ENG) – 59:57	4–2

6 min
Penalties
8 min
27
Shots
18

22 April 2014; 18:30	United States	4–3 (1–1, 2–2, 1–0)	Finland	Kisapuisto, Lappeenranta; Attendance: 4,047

Game reference

Alexander Nedeljkovic
Goalies
Kaapo Kahkonen
Referees:
(Sweden) Linus Ohlund
(Russia) Alexander Sergeyev
Linesmen:
(Russia) Gleb Lazarev
(Sweden) Andreas Malmqvist

	0–1	09:54 – M. Keskitalo (J. Lammikko, M. Honkanen)
N. Hanifin (PP) – 19:56	1–1
A. Bjork (D. Larkin) – 20:19	2–1
	2–2	25:42 – A. Saarela (M. Keskitalo)
	2–3	33:53 – J. Kiviranta (K. Kapanen)
K. Connor (A. Matthews, N. Hanifin) – 39:59	3–3
J. Eichel (S. Milano) – 58:56	4–3

2 min
Penalties
10 min
46
Shots
20

=== Relegation round ===
The last-placed teams played a best-of-three series.

24 April 2014; 11:00	Germany	3–2 (1–1, 1–1, 1–0)	Denmark	Arena, Imatra; Attendance: 988

Game reference

Florian Proske
Goalies
Thomas Lillie
Referees:
(United Kingdom) Michael Hicks
(Czech Republic) Pavel Hodek
Linesmen:
(Canada) Jordan Browne
(Norway) Alexander Waldejer

	0–1	12:04 – M. Eskildsen (E. Christensen, M. Jensen)
D. Kolb (A. Eder, T. Kircher) – 12:21	1–1
	1–2	31:19 – M. Jensen (T. Olsen, E. Grandal) (PP)
A. Eder (D. Kolb, T. Kircher) (PP) – 37:43	2–2
S. Loibl (M. Wiederer, E. Quaas) – 51:20	3–2

8 min
Penalties
4 min
24
Shots
24

25 April 2014; 16:00	Denmark	2–3 OT (2–0, 0–0, 0–2) (OT 0–1)	Germany	Arena, Imatra; Attendance: 746

Game reference

Thomas Lillie
Goalies
Florian Proske
Referees:
(Latvia) Andris Ansons
(Slovakia) Daniel Konc
Linesmen:
(Russia) Gleb Lazarev
(Czech Republic) Miroslav Lhotský

C. Mieritz (K. Jensen, M. Jensen) – 04:41	1–0
A. Krogsgaard (J. Holmberg, E. Grandal) (PP) – 12:57	2–0
	2–1	49:56 – A. Eder (T. Kircher, D. Trinkberger)
	2–2	55:40 – L. Koziol (T. Kircher, A. Eder)
	2–3	63:55 – J. Mayenschein (D. Trinkberger)

8 min
Penalties
4 min
10
Shots
33

- Denmark is relegated to next year's Division I A; the third game was not played because the result of the relegation series had been decided.

=== Knockout stage ===
Quarterfinals
B1	United States	6
A4	Slovakia	2
A2	Sweden	10
B3	Finland	0
A1	Canada	3
B4	Switzerland	2
B2	Czech Republic	3
A3	Russia	2

Semifinals
B1	United States	4
A2	Sweden	1
A1	Canada	3
B2	Czech Republic	4

Finals
B1	United States	5
B2	Czech Republic	2
Bronze medal game
A1	Canada	3
A2	Sweden	1

==== Quarterfinals ====
24 April 2014; 13:00	United States	6–2 (3–0, 1–0, 2–2)	Slovakia	Kisapuisto, Lappeenranta; Attendance: 503

Game reference

Alexander Nedeljkovic
Goalies
Matej Tomek
Adam Húska
Referees:
(Germany) Gordon Schukies
(Russia) Alexander Sergeyev
Linesmen:
(Russia) Gleb Lazarev
(Germany) Nikolaj Ponomarjow

J. Eichel (A. Tuch) – 00:54	1–0
J. MacLeod (J. Eichel) (PP2) – 03:28	2–0
A. Bjork (J. Eichel, S. Milano) – 17:08	3–0
A. Matthews (K. Connor, J. Glover) – 24:00	4–0
	4–1	46:17 – K. Ferleťák (C. Jaroš)
J. MacLeod (A. Tuch) (PP) – 48:30	5–1
N. Stevens (R. Collins) (PP) – 52:37	6–1
	6–2	55:30 – M. Halama (L. Hrusik, K. Ferleťák) (PP2)

14 min
Penalties
16 min
43
Shots
12

24 April 2014; 15:00	Czech Republic	3–2 OT (1–0, 0–1, 1–1) (OT 1–0)	Russia	Arena, Imatra; Attendance: 1,116

Game reference

Vítek Vaněček
Goalies
Maxim Tretiak
Referees:
(Finland) Mikko Kaukokari
(Switzerland) Tobias Wehrli
Linesmen:
(United States) Dana Penkivech
(Finland) Jani Pesonen

J. Vrána (O. Mikliš, D. Kaše) – 18:53	1–0
	1–1	32:35 – Y. Korshkov (K. Pilipenko, V. Kamenev) (PP)
D. Kaše (A. Rasner, M. Špaček) – 41:17	2–1
	2–2	49:02 – K. Pilipenko (E. Svechnikov, V. Kamenev)
J. Vrána (F. Pyrochta, D. Mašín) – 65:55	3–2

6 min
Penalties
4 min
28
Shots
27

24 April 2014; 17:00	Sweden	10–0 (3–0, 2–0, 5–0)	Finland	Kisapuisto, Lappeenranta; Attendance: 3,075

Game reference

Linus Söderström
Goalies
Kaapo Kähkönen
Joona Voutilainen
Referees:
(United States) Geoffrey Miller
(Canada) Kendrick Nicholson
Linesmen:
(Czech Republic) Miroslav Lhotský
(Japan) Sotaro Yamaguchi

W. Nylander (A. Holmström) – 00:52	1–0
K. Rosdahl (H. Törnqvist, J. Forsbacka-Karlsson) – 07:36	2–0
W. Lagesson (C. Ehn, K. Elgestål) – 10:43	3–0
W. Lagesson (PP) – 20:54	4–0
M. Pettersson (C. Ehn, A. Ottosson) – 22:16	5–0
R. Andersson (H. Törnqvist) – 41:43	6–0
K. Elgestål – 45:43	7–0
W. Nylander – 45:49	8–0
A. Holmström (O. Lindblom, W. Nylander) (PP) – 52:22	9–0
A. Holmström (W. Nylander, A. Ollas-Mattsson) – 54:25	10–0

8 min
Penalties
10 min
32
Shots
24

24 April 2014; 19:00	Canada	3–2 (1–1, 1–0, 1–1)	Switzerland	Arena, Imatra; Attendance: 1,116

Game reference

Mason McDonald
Goalies
Gauthier Descloux
Referees:
(Sweden) Linus Öhlund
(Finland) Anssi Salonen
Linesmen:
(Denmark) René Jensen
(Sweden) Andreas Malmqvist

	0–1	07:50 – D. Diem (R. Frick, D. Riat)
J. Virtanen (T. Sanheim, J. McCann) (PP) – 17:28	1–1
J. Quenneville (J. Hawryluk, R. Gropp) – 31:58	2–1
	2–2	55:43 – K. Fiala (D. Malgin, R. Karrer) (PP)
T. Konecny (T. Sanheim) – 59:30	3–2

16 min
Penalties
18 min
17
Shots
21

==== Semifinals ====
26 April 2014; 15:00	United States	4–1 (1–1, 1–0, 2–0)	Sweden	Kisapuisto, Lappeenranta; Attendance: 2,038

Game reference

Alexander Nedeljkovic
Goalies
Linus Söderström
Referees:
(Canada) Kendrick Nicholson
(Russia) Alexander Sergeyev
Linesmen:
(Canada) Jordan Browne
(Russia) Gleb Lazarev

	0–1	02:39 – G. Franzén (W. Nylander, A. Kempe)
A. Matthews (K. Connor) – 03:11	1–1
R. Hitchcock (N. Hanifin) – 27:47	2–1
D. Larkin (R. Hitchcock) – 48:38	3–1
J. Eichel (D. Larkin) (ENG) – 59:14	4–1

14 min
Penalties
6 min
34
Shots
20

26 April 2014; 19:00	Canada	3–4 OT (0–1, 1–2, 2–0) (OT 0–1)	Czech Republic	Kisapuisto, Lappeenranta; Attendance: 1,603

Game reference

Mason McDonald
Goalies
Vítek Vaněček
Referees:
(Finland) Mikko Kaukokari
(Switzerland) Tobias Wehrli
Linesmen:
(Sweden) Andreas Malmqvist
(United States) Dana Penkivech

	0–1	01:15 – M. Špaček (J. Vrána)
	0–2	27:37 – J. Vrána (M. Špaček, J. Zbořil)
	0–3	32:57 – J. Šmejkal (R. Veselý)
M. Barzal (D. Audette, J. Quenneville) (PP) – 34:51	1–3
J. Hicketts (C. Bleackley) – 45:02	2–3
D. Audette (M. Barzal) – 52:21	3–3
	3–4	66:17 – D. Kaše

4 min
Penalties
6 min
30
Shots
33

==== Bronze medal game ====
27 April 2014; 15:00	Canada	3–1 (1–1, 1–0, 1–0)	Sweden	Kisapuisto, Lappeenranta; Attendance: 3,251

Game reference

Mason McDonald
Goalies
Linus Söderström
Referees:
(United States) Geoffrey Miller
(Finland) Anssi Salonen
Linesmen:
(Czech Republic) Miroslav Lhotský
(Japan) Sotaro Yamaguchi

	0–1	10:07 – H. Törnqvist (SH)
B. Perlini (J. Virtanen) (PP) – 17:02	1–1
L. Crouse (T. Konecny, J. Hicketts) – 31:57	2–1
T. Konecny (T. Sanheim, J. Hicketts) – 55:22	3–1

30 min
Penalties
45 min
26
Shots
39

==== Final ====
27 April 2014; 19:00	United States	5–2 (3–1, 2–1, 0–0)	Czech Republic	Kisapuisto, Lappeenranta; Attendance: 3,338

Game reference

Alexander Nedeljkovic
Goalies
Vítek Vaněček
Referees:
(Finland) Mikko Kaukokari
(Switzerland) Tobias Wehrli
Linesmen:
(Sweden) Andreas Malmqvist
(Finland) Jani Pesonen

J. Dougherty (S. Milano, J. Eichel) – 00:33	1–0
A. Matthews (K. Connor, R. Collins) – 06:55	2–0
S. Milano (L. Belpedio, J. MacLeod) – 07:41	3–0
	3–1	19:26 – J. Šmejkal (R. Veselý, F. Chlapík)
D. Larkin (S. Milano) – 21:13	4–1
A. Matthews (B. Fortunato) – 26:57	5–1
	5–2	33:20 – D. Kaše (A. Rasner, M. Špaček) (PP)

6 min
Penalties
6 min
41
Shots
17

=== Scoring leaders ===
List shows the top ten skaters sorted by points, then goals.

Player	GP	G	A	Pts	+/−	PIM
(Sweden) William Nylander	7	6	10	16	+8	0
(Sweden) Axel Holmström	7	3	8	11	+8	4
(Czech Republic) Jakub Vrána	7	8	2	10	+3	4
(United States) Jack Eichel	7	5	5	10	+6	2
(United States) Sonny Milano	7	3	7	10	+6	4
(Switzerland) Kevin Fiala	5	4	5	9	+4	8
(Russia) Kirill Pilipenko	5	5	2	7	0	0
(United States) Auston Matthews	7	5	2	7	+7	4
(United States) Kyle Connor	7	4	3	7	+8	0
(Switzerland) Denis Malgin	5	3	4	7	+4	2

GP = Games played; G = Goals; A = Assists; Pts = Points; +/− = Plus–minus; PIM = Penalties In Minutes
Source: IIHF.com

=== Leading goaltenders ===
Only the top five goaltenders, based on save percentage, who have played 40% of their team's minutes are included in this list.

Player	TOI	SA	GA	GAA	Sv%	SO
(Canada) Mason McDonald	371:17	171	12	1.94	92.98	0
(Switzerland) Gauthier Descloux	238:28	101	9	2.26	91.09	0
(Slovakia) Adam Húska	159:52	84	8	3.00	90.48	0
(United States) Alex Nedeljkovic	359:05	112	11	1.84	90.18	1
(Russia) Maxim Tretiak	183:55	80	8	2.61	90.00	0

TOI = Time on ice (minutes:seconds); SA = Shots against; GA = Goals against; GAA = Goals against average; Sv% = Save percentage; SO = Shutouts
Source: IIHF.com

=== Tournament Awards ===
Best players selected by the directorate:

- Best Goalkeeper: Mason McDonald (CAN)
- Best Defenseman: Haydn Fleury (CAN)
- Best Forward: William Nylander (SWE)

Source: IIHF.com

=== Final standings ===
	Team
1st place, gold medalist(s)	United States
2nd place, silver medalist(s)	Czech Republic
3rd place, bronze medalist(s)	Canada
4th	Sweden
5th	Russia
6th	Finland
7th	Switzerland
8th	Slovakia
9th	Germany
10th	Denmark

Relegated to the 2015 Division I A

2014 IIHF U18 World champions

United States
8th title

== Division I ==
=== Group A ===
The Division I A tournament was played in Nice, France, from 13 to 19 April 2014.

Pos	Team	Pld	W	OTW	OTL	L	GF	GA	GD	Pts	Promotion or relegation
1	Latvia	5	4	0	0	1	20	11	+9	12	Promoted to the 2015 Top Division
2	Norway	5	3	1	0	1	26	12	+14	11	
3	Kazakhstan	5	3	0	1	1	17	11	+6	10	
4	Belarus	5	2	1	1	1	15	12	+3	9	
5	France	5	1	0	0	4	9	22	−13	3	
6	Italy	5	0	0	0	5	8	27	−19	0	Relegated to the 2015 Division I B

Source: IIHF

=== Group B ===
The Division I B tournament was played in Székesfehérvár, Hungary, from 13 to 19 April 2014.

Pos	Team	Pld	W	OTW	OTL	L	GF	GA	GD	Pts	Promotion or relegation
1	Hungary	5	5	0	0	0	35	10	+25	15	Promoted to the 2015 Division I A
2	Austria	5	3	0	0	2	15	10	+5	9	
3	Slovenia	5	3	0	0	2	15	16	−1	9	
4	Japan	5	3	0	0	2	22	20	+2	9	
5	Ukraine	5	1	0	0	4	15	16	−1	3	
6	Poland	5	0	0	0	5	5	35	−30	0	Relegated to the 2015 Division II A

Source: IIHF

== Division II ==
=== Group A ===
The Division II A tournament was played in Dumfries, Great Britain, from 24 to 30 March 2014.

Pos	Team	Pld	W	OTW	OTL	L	GF	GA	GD	Pts	Promotion or relegation
1	Lithuania	5	3	1	1	0	23	12	+11	12	Promoted to the 2015 Division I B
2	South Korea	5	2	2	0	1	24	21	+3	10	
3	Croatia	5	3	0	0	2	18	14	+4	9	
4	Netherlands	5	2	0	0	3	12	17	−5	6	
5	Great Britain	5	1	0	1	3	16	25	−9	4	
6	Romania	5	1	0	1	3	15	19	−4	4	Relegated to the 2015 Division II B

Source: IIHF

=== Group B ===
The Division II B tournament was played in Tallinn, Estonia, from 14 to 20 April 2014.

Pos	Team	Pld	W	OTW	OTL	L	GF	GA	GD	Pts	Promotion or relegation
1	Estonia	5	4	0	0	1	30	13	+17	12	Promoted to the 2015 Division II A
2	Spain	5	4	0	0	1	25	11	+14	12	
3	Serbia	5	4	0	0	1	31	9	+22	12	
4	Belgium	5	1	1	0	3	17	31	−14	5	
5	China	5	1	0	1	3	16	21	−5	4	
6	Iceland	5	0	0	0	5	8	42	−34	0	Relegated to the 2015 Division III A

Source: IIHF

== Division III ==
=== Group A ===
The Division III A tournament was played in Sofia, Bulgaria, from 24 to 30 March 2014.

Pos	Team	Pld	W	OTW	OTL	L	GF	GA	GD	Pts	Promotion or relegation
1	Australia	5	4	0	0	1	14	6	+8	12	Promoted to the 2015 Division II B
2	Israel	5	3	0	0	2	25	15	+10	9	
3	Chinese Taipei	5	2	1	0	2	12	13	−1	8	
4	Bulgaria	5	2	0	0	3	11	17	−6	6	
5	Mexico	5	2	0	0	3	13	10	+3	6	
6	New Zealand	5	1	0	1	3	9	23	−14	4	Relegated to the 2015 Division III B

Source: IIHF

=== Group B ===
The Division III B tournament was played in İzmit, Turkey, from 13 to 15 February 2014.

Pos	Team	Pld	W	OTW	OTL	L	GF	GA	GD	Pts	Promotion
1	South Africa	2	2	0	0	0	10	4	+6	6	Promoted to the 2015 Division III A
2	Turkey	2	1	0	0	1	6	4	+2	3	
3	Hong Kong	2	0	0	0	2	5	13	−8	0	

Source: IIHF
