= Rasner =

Rasner is a surname. Notable people with the name include:

- Darrell Rasner (born 1981), American baseball player
- Martin Rasner (born 1995), Austrian footballer

== See also ==
- Alex Rašner (born 1996), Czech ice hockey player
