= Keskitalo =

Keskitalo is a Finnish surname. Notable people with the surname include:

- Sinikka Keskitalo (1951–2011), Finnish long-distance runner
- Petri Keskitalo (born 1967), Finnish decathlete
- Aili Keskitalo (born 1968), Norwegian Sami politician
- Miro Keskitalo (born 1996), Finnish ice hockey defenceman
