= 2016 Deutschland Cup =

Tournament details
- Host country: Germany
- Venue: 1 (in 1 host city)
- Dates: 4–6 November
- Teams: 4

Final positions
- Champions: Slovakia (4th title)
- Runners-up: Canada
- Third place: Germany
- Fourth place: Switzerland

Tournament statistics
- Games played: 6
- Goals scored: 28 (4.67 per game)
- Attendance: 27,690 (4,615 per game)
- Scoring leader: (Canada) Kevin Clark (4 points)

Official website
- Website

The 2016 Deutschland Cup was the 27th edition of the tournament.

== Teams ==
- Canada
- Germany
- Slovakia
- Switzerland

== Standings ==
Pos	Team	Pld	W	OTW	OTL	L	GF	GA	GD	Pts
1	Slovakia	3	2	1	0	0	11	5	+6	8
2	Canada	3	2	0	1	0	9	5	+4	7
3	Germany	3	1	0	0	2	5	8	−3	3
4	Switzerland	3	0	0	0	3	3	10	−7	0

Source: IIHF
Rules for classification: 1) points; 2) head-to-head points; 3) head-to-head goal difference; 4) head-to-head number of goals scored.

== Results ==
All times are local (UTC+1).

4 November 2016; 16:00	Canada	3–0 (1–0, 1–0, 1–0)	Switzerland	Curt Frenzel Stadium, Augsburg; Attendance: 4,000

Game reference

Danny Taylor
Goalies
Tobias Stephan
Referees:
(Germany) Rainer Köttstorfer
(Germany) Marian Rohatsch
Linesmen:
(Germany) Lukas Kohlmüller
(Germany) Tobias Schwenk

Robinson (Roy, Kozun) (PP) – 12:13	1–0
Kinrade (Robinson, Kozun) (PP) – 24:52	2–0
Roy (Talbot) (ENG) – 58:54	3–0

8 min
Penalties
6 min
19
Shots
20

4 November 2016; 19:30	Germany	1–3 (0–0, 0–1, 1–2)	Slovakia	Curt Frenzel Stadium, Augsburg; Attendance: 4,035

Game reference

Felix Brueckmann
Goalies
Jaroslav Janus
Referees:
(Germany) Sirko Hunnius
(Czech Republic) Robin Sir
Linesmen:
(Germany) Jonas Merten
(Germany) Andreas Roth

	0–1	33:24 – Čajkovský (Haščák, Mikúš)
	0–2	51:39 – Dravecký (Mikúš, Graňák)
Krämmer (Oppenheimer, Fauser) (EA) – 58:20	1–2
	1–3	59:11 – Hrnka (Skokan) (ENG)

6 min
Penalties
6 min
30
Shots
32

5 November 2016; 16:00	Slovakia	4–3 GWS (1–1, 2–1, 0–1); OT (0–0); GWS (1–0)	Canada	Curt Frenzel Stadium, Augsburg; Attendance: 4,500

Game reference

Jaroslav Janus
Goalies
Barry Brust
Referees:
(Germany) Sirko Hunnius
(Germany) Marian Rohatsch
Linesmen:
(Germany) Jonas Merten
(Germany) Tobias Schwenk

	0–1	07:49 – Clark (Petersen, Scott)
Gernát (Kudrna) – 10:40	1–1
Kudrna (Šedivý) (SH) – 31:51	2–1
	2–2	32:30 – Ellison (Genoway, Szczechura)
Jánošík (Čerešňák, Hrnka) – 33:10	3–2
	3–3	47:46 – Scott (Clark)

Skokan (miss)
Hrnka (miss)
Dravecký
Shootout
(miss) Kozun
(miss) Lee
(miss) Szczechura
24 min
Penalties
10 min
19
Shots
33

5 November 2016; 19:30	Switzerland	2–3 (1–0, 1–1, 0–2)	Germany	Curt Frenzel Stadium, Augsburg; Attendance: 4,985

Game reference

Robert Mayer
Goalies
Mathias Niederberger
Referees:
(Germany) Marc Iwert
(Czech Republic) Robin Sir
Linesmen:
(Germany) Kilian Hinterdobler
(Germany) Lukas Kohlmüller

Herren (Haas, Martschini) – 04:19	1–0
	1–1	25:51 – Krämmer (Hospelt, Brandt) (PP)
Schäppi (Rod) – 37:19	2–1
	2–2	45:08 – Pföderl (Radeke)
	2–3	48:37 – Reul (Pföderl) (SH)

33 min
Penalties
10 min
31
Shots
18

6 November 2016; 13:00	Switzerland	1–4 (0–1, 0–0, 1–3)	Slovakia	Curt Frenzel Stadium, Augsburg; Attendance: 4,500

Game reference

Tobias Stephan
Goalies
Ján Laco
Referees:
(Germany) Marc Iwert
(Germany) Rainer Köttstorfer
Linesmen:
(Germany) Kilian Hinterdobler
(Germany) Andreas Roth

	0–1	15:17 – Cingeľ (Gernát) (SH)
Martschini – 41:59	1–1
	1–2	43:50 – Čajkovský (Kudrna)
	1–3	50:46 – Haščák (Cingeľ)
	1–4	58:58 – Haščák (Gernát) (ENG)

8 min
Penalties
6 min
24
Shots
23

6 November 2016; 16:30	Germany	1–3 (0–3, 0–0, 1–0)	Canada	Curt Frenzel Stadium, Augsburg; Attendance: 5,670

Game reference

Niklas Treutle
Goalies
Danny Taylor
Referees:
(Germany) Marian Rohatsch
(Czech Republic) Robin Sir
Linesmen:
(Germany) Lukas Kohlmüller
(Germany) Jonas Merten

	0–1	05:23 – Clark (Petersen, Scott)
	0–2	17:24 – Roy (Talbot, Robinson)
	0–3	18:11 – Clark (Petersen, Sigalet)
Greilinger (Pietta, Flaake) – 45:49	1–3

6 min
Penalties
4 min
29
Shots
37
