= Christoffer Ehn =

Swedish ice hockey player (born 1996)

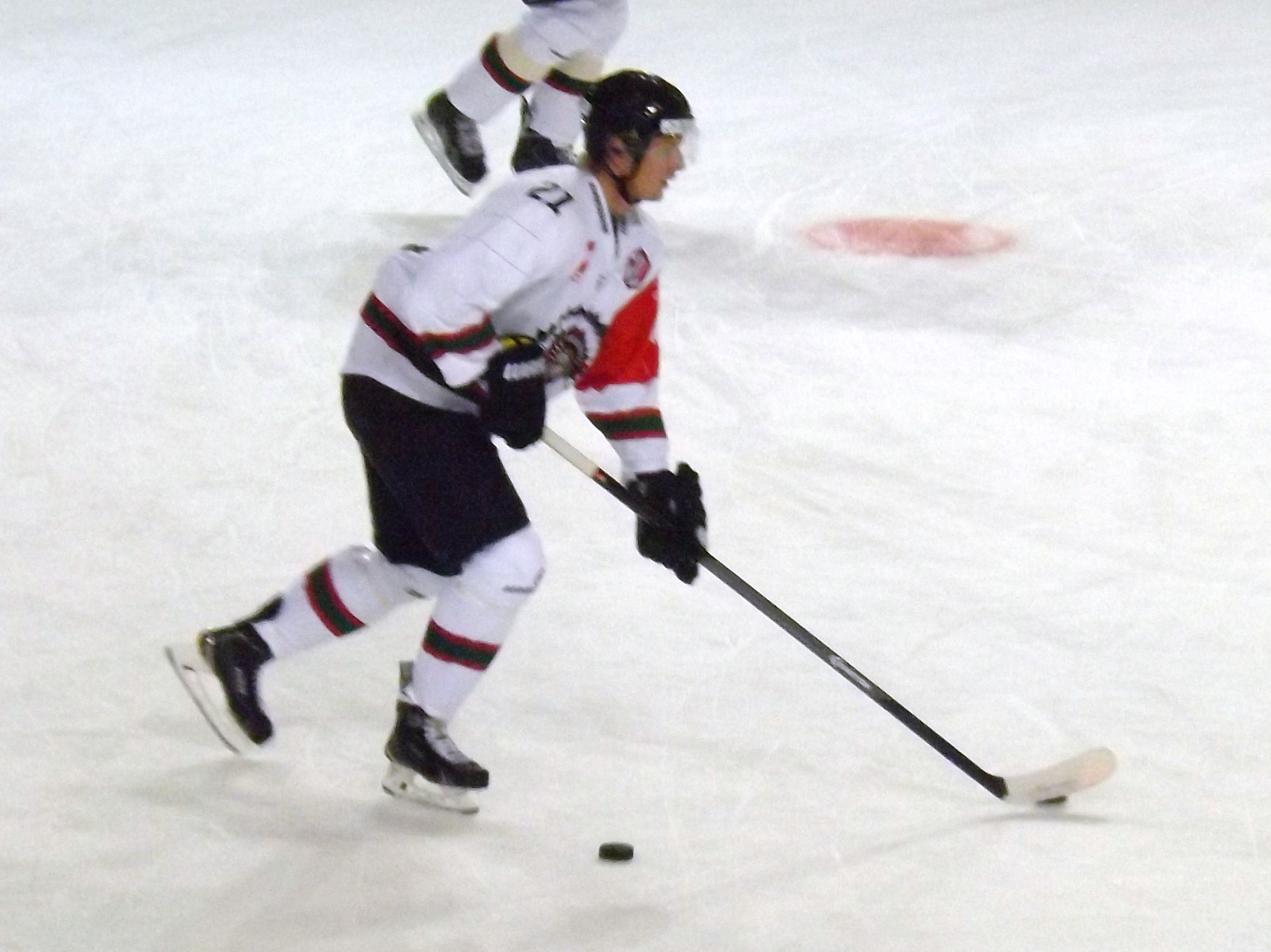
- Ehn with Frölunda HC in 2014
- Born: 5 April 1996 (age 30) Skara, Sweden
- Height: 6 ft 3 in (191 cm)
- Weight: 181 lb (82 kg; 12 st 13 lb)
- Position: Forward
- Shoots: Left
- SHL team Former teams: Linköping HC; Frölunda HC; Detroit Red Wings
- NHL draft: 106th overall, 2014; Detroit Red Wings
- Playing career: 2013–present

Christoffer Ehn (born 5 April 1996) is a Swedish professional ice hockey forward, who is currently playing with Linköping HC of the Swedish Hockey League (SHL). Ehn was drafted 106th overall by the Detroit Red Wings in the 2014 NHL entry draft.

== Playing career ==
During the 2013–14 season, Ehn recorded eight goals and ten assists in 15 games with Frölunda HC's Under-18 team, as well as four goals and seven assists in 45 games with Frölunda's J20 SuperElit team. Ehn was ranked 89th by the NHL Central Scouting Bureau on their final list of the top draft-eligible European skaters leading into the 2014 NHL entry draft.

During the 2015–16 season, Ehn recorded two assists in 37 regular season games, and one assist in 16 playoff games, helping lead Frölunda HC to the Le Mat Trophy.

During the 2016–17 season, Ehn recorded four goals and nine assists in 52 games with Frölunda HC. Following the conclusion of the season, Ehn left the Swedish Hockey League (SHL) and was signed to a professional tryout by the Grand Rapids Griffins, the American Hockey League (AHL) affiliate of the Red Wings. On 20 April 2017, Ehn signed a three-year, entry-level contract with the Red Wings. He made his NHL debut for the Red Wings on 4 October 2018. Ehn was re-assigned to the Grand Rapids Griffins on 25 October after playing in nine games but was recalled a few weeks later on 21 November. On 23 December he scored his first career NHL goal against Garret Sparks of the Toronto Maple Leafs in a 5–4 overtime loss.

During the 2018–19 season in his first full year in the NHL, Ehn posted three goals and six assists in 60 games, while averaging 10:37 time on ice.

As a free agent from the Red Wings following the completion of his contract, Ehn opted to return on a one-year contract to his original Swedish club, Frölunda HC of the SHL, on 6 November 2020. In the following 2020–21 season, Ehn made 36 regular season appearances, contributing with 4 goals and 9 points.

On 11 May 2021, Ehn joined his second SHL club, agreeing to a three-year contract as a free agent with Linköping HC.

== International play ==
Ehn represented Sweden at the 2014 IIHF World U18 Championships, where he recorded three assists in seven games. Ehn later represented Sweden at the 2015 World Junior Ice Hockey Championships, where he recorded two assists in seven games. Ehn represented Sweden at the 2016 World Junior Ice Hockey Championships, where he recorded one goal and one assist in seven games.

== Career statistics ==
=== Regular season and playoffs ===
			Regular season					Playoffs
Season	Team	League	GP	G	A	Pts	PIM	GP	G	A	Pts	PIM
2011–12	Skövde IK	J18	25	7	4	11	16	—	—	—	—	—
2011–12	Skövde IK	SWE.2 U20	14	4	0	4	4	—	—	—	—	—
2012–13	Frölunda HC	J18	21	6	14	20	6	—	—	—	—	—
2012–13	Frölunda HC	J18 Allsv	12	3	8	11	10	3	1	0	1	2
2013–14	Frölunda HC	J18	8	4	5	9	4	—	—	—	—	—
2013–14	Frölunda HC	J18 Allsv	7	4	5	9	0	5	1	3	4	0
2013–14	Frölunda HC	J20	45	4	7	11	14	3	3	0	3	0
2013–14	Frölunda HC	SHL	2	0	0	0	0	—	—	—	—	—
2014–15	Frölunda HC	J20	40	12	24	36	61	—	—	—	—	—
2014–15	Frölunda HC	SHL	6	0	0	0	2	10	0	0	0	2
2014–15	IK Oskarshamn	Allsv	4	0	0	0	0	—	—	—	—	—
2015–16	Frölunda HC	J20	14	9	7	16	0	1	2	0	2	0
2015–16	Frölunda HC	SHL	37	0	2	2	2	16	0	1	1	0
2015–16	BIK Karlskoga	Allsv	13	2	3	5	8	—	—	—	—	—
2016–17	Frölunda HC	SHL	52	4	9	13	10	14	1	1	2	4
2017–18	Frölunda HC	SHL	50	7	10	17	24	6	0	0	0	0
2018–19	Detroit Red Wings	NHL	60	3	6	9	6	—	—	—	—	—
2018–19	Grand Rapids Griffins	AHL	17	2	5	7	8	5	0	2	2	2
2019–20	Detroit Red Wings	NHL	54	2	2	4	2	—	—	—	—	—
2020–21	Frölunda HC	SHL	34	4	5	9	60	7	1	0	1	4
2021–22	Linköping HC	SHL	50	9	9	18	10	—	—	—	—	—
2022–23	Linköping HC	SHL	47	11	10	21	35	—	—	—	—	—
2023–24	Linköping HC	SHL	52	4	13	17	14	4	0	0	0	0
2024–25	Linköping HC	SHL	52	14	14	28	4	—	—	—	—	—
SHL totals			382	53	72	125	161	57	2	2	4	10
NHL totals			114	5	8	13	8	—	—	—	—	—

=== International ===
Year	Team	Event	Result	GP	G	A	Pts	PIM
2014	Sweden	WJC18	4th	7	0	3	3	0
2015	Sweden	WJC	4th	7	0	2	2	2
2016	Sweden	WJC	4th	7	1	1	2	2
Junior totals				21	1	6	7	4
