= Daniel Audette =

Canadian ice hockey player (born 1996)

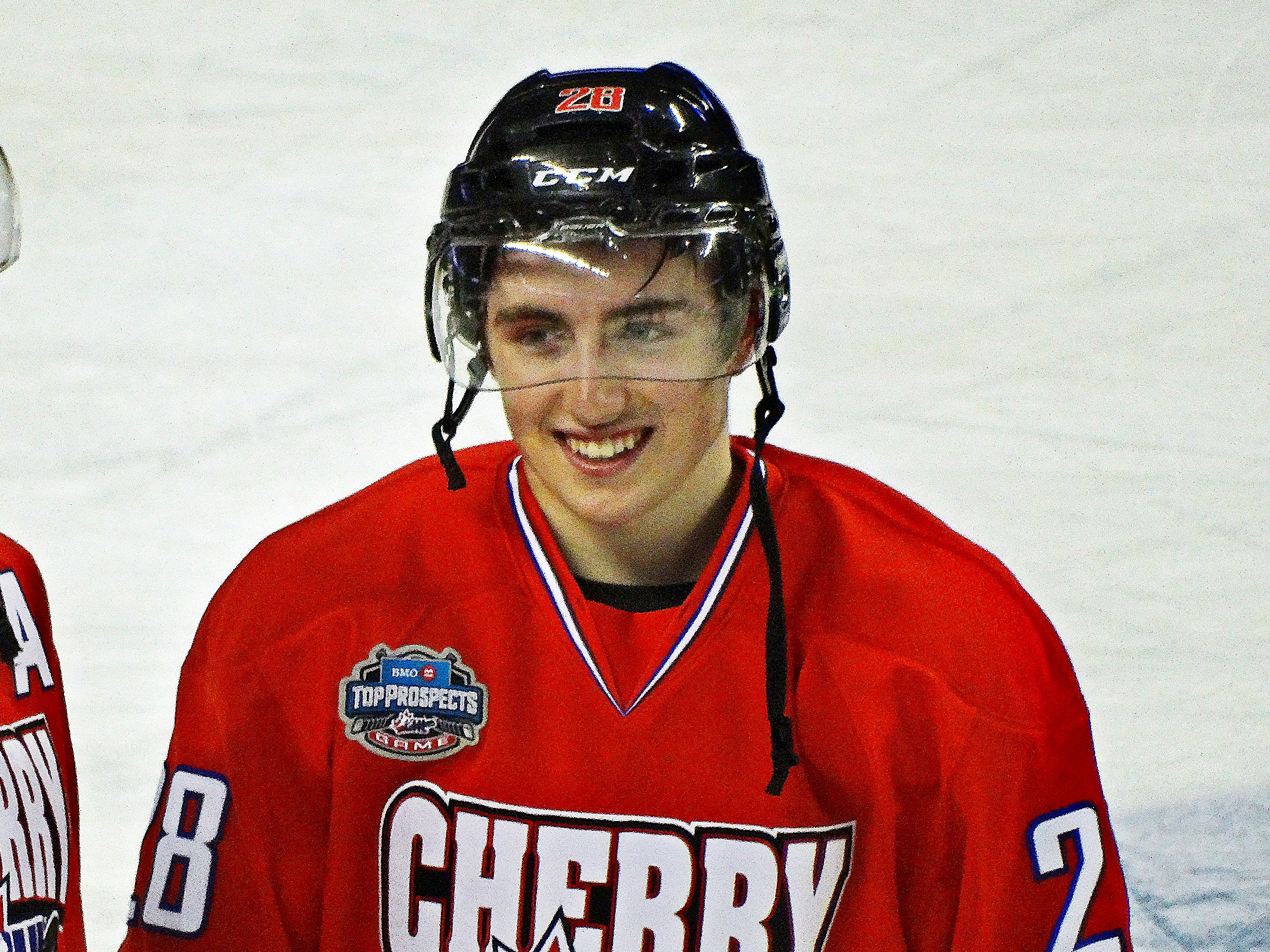
- Audette in 2014
- Born: May 6, 1996 (age 30) Blainville, Quebec, Canada
- Height: 5 ft 9 in (175 cm)
- Weight: 165 lb (75 kg; 11 st 11 lb)
- Position: Centre
- Shoots: Left
- Czech team Former teams: Rytíři Kladno; St. John's IceCaps; Laval Rocket; Springfield Thunderbirds; Lukko; HC Vityaz; Örebro HK; Lausanne HC; HC Ajoie; EHC Kloten
- NHL draft: 147th overall, 2014; Montreal Canadiens
- Playing career: 2016–present

Daniel Audette (born May 6, 1996) is a Canadian professional ice hockey centre for Rytíři Kladno in the Czech Extraliga. He was selected in the fifth round, 147th overall, by the Montreal Canadiens in the 2014 NHL entry draft.

== Playing career ==
=== Junior ===
Following a stellar season with Collège Esther-Blondin Phénix of the Quebec Junior AAA Hockey League (QMAAA), Audette was selected first overall in the 2012 Quebec Major Junior Hockey League (QMJHL) Entry Draft by the Sherbrooke Phoenix. During his four seasons with the team, he amassed 237 points, setting the franchise record for most goals, assists, and points.

Audette was subsequently selected in the fifth round (147th overall) by the Montreal Canadiens at the 2014 NHL entry draft. When he signed his entry-level contract, Audette became the first Phoenix draftee to sign a professional contract in the National Hockey League (NHL).

=== Professional ===
During the 2018–19 season, Audette played on multiple lines throughout the lineup for the Laval Rocket, the American Hockey League (AHL) affiliate of the Canadiens. In the final year of his contract, he played first-line centre, left wing, and third-line centre throughout the season. At the end of the season, the Canadiens opted not to offer him a new contract. Audette eventually signed a minor league deal with the Springfield Thunderbirds on September 13, 2019.

Having competed in five seasons in the AHL, Audette opted to pause his North American career and sign his first contract abroad, agreeing to a one-year contract with Finnish Liiga club, Lukko, on May 28, 2020. In his debut European season, Audette enjoyed a standout 2020–21 campaign, recording a professional best with 37 assists and 50 points in 60 regular season games. He continued with four helpers in 11 postseason games to help Lukko claim their first Finnish championship.

As a free agent from Lukko, Audette continued his career abroad in agreeing to a one-year contract with Russian based club, HC Vityaz of the Kontinental Hockey League (KHL), on June 1, 2021. Despite this, Audette would leave HC Vityaz midway through the 2021–22 KHL season, signing with Örebro HK of the Swedish Hockey League (SHL) for the remainder of the 2021–22 SHL season on February 15, 2022.

In August 2022, Audette signed a two-year deal with Lausanne HC of the Switzerland-based National League (NL). However, following the 2022–23 season, both parties mutually agreed to part ways on June 16, 2024. Audette (along with former AHL teammate Éric Gélinas) then joined HC Ajoie for the 2023–24 season.

On June 12, 2024, Audette signed with EHC Kloten for the 2024–25 season.

== International play ==
Following his rookie QMJHL season in 2012–13, Audette competed in the annual Ivan Hlinka Memorial Tournament, winning gold with Team Canada. He was likewise a part of the bronze medalist Canadian team at the 2014 IIHF World U18 Championship.

== Personal life ==
Audette's father, Donald, is a former professional ice hockey winger who played a total of fourteen NHL seasons with the Buffalo Sabres, Los Angeles Kings, Atlanta Thrashers, Dallas Stars, Montreal Canadiens and Florida Panthers.

== Career statistics ==
=== Regular season and playoffs ===
			Regular season					Playoffs
Season	Team	League	GP	G	A	Pts	PIM	GP	G	A	Pts	PIM
2010–11	Collège Esther-Blondin Phénix	QMAAA	4	0	0	0	6	2	0	0	0	0
2011–12	Collège Esther-Blondin Phénix	QMAAA	39	25	35	60	57	13	7	16	23	20
2012–13	Sherbrooke Phoenix	QMJHL	54	10	19	29	65	4	0	2	2	6
2013–14	Sherbrooke Phoenix	QMJHL	68	21	55	76	79	—	—	—	—	—
2014–15	Sherbrooke Phoenix	QMJHL	60	29	44	73	64	6	2	4	6	0
2015–16	Sherbrooke Phoenix	QMJHL	52	22	37	59	53	5	1	5	6	2
2015–16	St. John's IceCaps	AHL	4	0	0	0	0	—	—	—	—	—
2016–17	St. John's IceCaps	AHL	75	10	20	30	37	4	0	1	1	0
2017–18	Laval Rocket	AHL	56	13	16	29	55	—	—	—	—	—
2018–19	Laval Rocket	AHL	71	14	25	39	53	—	—	—	—	—
2019–20	Springfield Thunderbirds	AHL	58	13	25	38	37	—	—	—	—	—
2020–21	Lukko	Liiga	60	13	37	50	34	11	0	4	4	0
2021–22	HC Vityaz	KHL	45	17	22	39	8	—	—	—	—	—
2021–22	Örebro HK	SHL	11	2	4	6	4	7	0	3	3	0
2022–23	Lausanne HC	NL	42	10	11	21	12	—	—	—	—	—
2023–24	HC Ajoie	NL	51	13	25	38	8	—	—	—	—	—
AHL totals			264	50	86	136	182	4	0	1	1	0
Liiga totals			60	13	37	50	34	11	0	4	4	0
KHL totals			45	17	22	39	8	—	—	—	—	—

=== International ===
Year	Team	Event	Result	GP	G	A	Pts	PIM
2012	Canada Quebec	U17	6th	5	0	1	1	0
2013	Canada Quebec	U17	4th	5	1	2	3	4
2013	Canada	IH18	1st place, gold medalist(s)	5	1	2	3	2
2014	Canada	U18	3rd place, bronze medalist(s)	7	2	1	3	14
Junior totals				22	4	6	10	20

== Awards and honours ==
Award	Year	Ref
QMAAA
Champions (Collège Esther-Blondin Phénix)	2012	
First All-Star Team	2012	
Top Prospect Award	2012	
Liiga
Champions (Lukko)	2021	
