= Vladislav Kamenev =

Russian ice hockey player (born 1996)

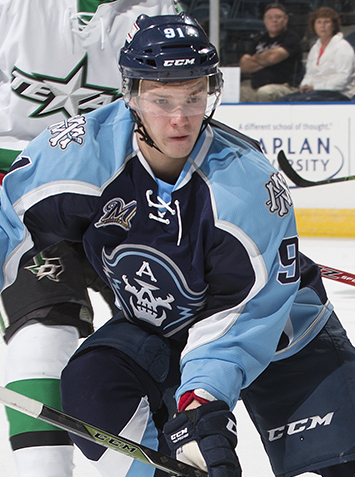
- Kamenev with the Milwaukee Admirals in 2015
- Born: 12 August 1996 (age 30) Orsk, Russia
- Height: 6 ft 2 in (188 cm)
- Weight: 194 lb (88 kg; 13 st 12 lb)
- Position: Forward
- Shoots: Left
- KHL team Former teams: Free agent Metallurg Magnitogorsk; Nashville Predators; Colorado Avalanche; SKA Saint Petersburg; CSKA Moscow
- National team: Russia
- NHL draft: 42nd overall, 2014; Nashville Predators
- Playing career: 2013–present

Vladislav Dmitriyevich Kamenev (Russian: Владислав Дмитриевич Каменев, born 12 August 1996) is a Russian professional ice hockey forward. He is currently an unrestricted free agent and most recently played with HC CSKA Moscow of the Kontinental Hockey League (KHL). Kamenev was originally selected by the Nashville Predators in the second round (42nd overall) of the 2014 NHL entry draft.

== Playing career ==
=== Metalurg Magnitogorsk ===
Kamenev played as a youth and later made his Kontinental Hockey League (KHL) debut playing with Metallurg Magnitogorsk during the 2013–14 KHL season. He was selected by the Nashville Predators in the second round, 42nd overall, of the 2014 NHL entry draft.

At the conclusion of his first full KHL season in 2014–15 with Magnitogorsk, Kamenev opted to pursue his NHL ambitions, in agreeing to a three-year entry-level contract with the Nashville Predators on 10 July 2015.

=== Nashville Predators ===
In the 2016–17 season, Kamenev made his NHL debut on 6 January 2017, against the Florida Panthers, after being recalled by the Predators from the Milwaukee Admirals. During an interview, Kamenev recalled being at the Florida airport just about an hour before the Fort Lauderdale airport shooting, as he was travelling to reach the team after playing a game in California with the Admirals. He appeared in 2 scoreless games with the Predators before he was returned to play out the remainder of the campaign with the Admirals, collecting 21 goals and 51 points in 70 games.

He was assigned to continue in his third season with the Milwaukee Admirals to start the 2017–18 season. Kamenev increased his scoring pace with 8 points in 10 games with the Admirals before he was dealt by the Predators, alongside Samuel Girard and a 2018 second round pick, in a three-team trade to the Colorado Avalanche, including Matt Duchene and Kyle Turris from the Ottawa Senators on 5 November 2017.

=== Colorado Avalanche ===
With the Avalanche embarking on a Global Series in Sweden, he was to continue in the AHL with affiliate, the San Antonio Rampage. He compiled 4 assists in as many games with the Rampage before he was recalled to Colorado on 14 November 2017. On 16 November 2017, Kamenev made his Avalanche debut against the Washington Capitals, centering a line between Sven Andrighetto and Nail Yakupov. During the second period of an eventual 6–2 victory for the Avalanche, Kamenev left the game as a result of a neutral zone check from Capitals veteran defenseman, Brooks Orpik. He was later diagnosed with a broken forearm and placed indefinitely on the injury reserve list. Kamenev missed 50 games before he returned to health and was sent on a conditioning assignment to the San Antonio Rampage on 10 March 2018. He later returned to the Avalanche and appeared in two further regular season games. He remained on the Avalanche playoff roster however did not feature in their first-round defeat to his former club the Nashville Predators.

During his first pre-season with the Avalanche, Kamenev ended training camp on the injured reserve, before he was reassigned to begin the 2018–19 season with new AHL affiliate the Colorado Eagles. He appeared in 2 games before he was recalled by the Avalanche on 8 October 2018. Kamenev recorded his first NHL point on an assist on a Mark Barberio goal in a 3–2 defeat to the Minnesota Wild on 27 October 2018. Kamenev soon notched his first career NHL goal on 1 November 2018 in a 6–5 loss to the Calgary Flames. Fellow rookie Sheldon Dries also scored his first NHL goal that game, making the pair the first Avalanche rookies to score their first NHL goals in the same game since 27 January 1995. His shorthanded goal was also the first tallied by the Avalanche rookie since Greg Mauldin in 2010. In a bottom six role, Kamenev showed promise within his role with the Avalanche, posting 5 points in 23 games before his season was again thwarted by injury, suffering a season ending shoulder injury against the Tampa Bay Lightning on 8 December 2018.

On 30 July 2019, Kamenev was re-signed by the Avalanche to a one-year contract extension. Approaching his third season within the Avalanche, Kamenev now waiver eligible made the club's opening night roster for the 2019–20 season. With the Avalanche adding significant forward depth in the off-season, Kamenev began the season as a healthy scratch. In a limited fourth-line role, he tallied 1 goal and 8 points in 38 games with the Avalanche before the regular season was paused due to the COVID-19 pandemic.

Kamenev was later named in the Avalanche's Return to Play training camp roster, however having earlier contracted coronavirus following the cancellation of the regular season and then followed by the removal of his appendix, he was left of the Avalanche playoff roster due to concerns he would not withstand the post-season pace.

=== Return to KHL ===
As a restricted free agent with the Avalanche, Kamenev's KHL rights were traded by Metallurg Magnitogorsk to SKA Saint Petersburg in exchange for Nikolai Prokhorkin on 11 June 2020. With ambitions to play on the Russian Olympic team in 2022, Kamenev in search of a larger role agreed to return to the KHL by signing a two-year contract with SKA Saint Petersburg on 1 September 2020. In his first season with SKA in 2020–21, Kamenev was fairly limited through injury and recorded just 5 goals in 21 regular season games. He notched 4 points in 10 playoff games, unable to help propel SKA past CSKA Moscow in the conference finals.

In the following 2021–22 season, Kamenev was unable to cement a role within SKA, collecting just 1 assist through 7 regular season games. On 15 October 2021, Kamenev was released from his contract and joined rivals CSKA Moscow for the remainder of the season.

== Career statistics ==
=== Regular season and playoffs ===
			Regular season					Playoffs
Season	Team	League	GP	G	A	Pts	PIM	GP	G	A	Pts	PIM
2012–13	Stalnye Lisy	MHL	36	9	6	15	22	3	0	0	0	0
2013–14	Stalnye Lisy	MHL	15	4	6	10	12	5	1	2	3	4
2013–14	Yuzhny Ural Orsk	VHL	3	0	1	1	2	1	0	0	0	0
2013–14	Metallurg Magnitogorsk	KHL	16	1	0	1	2	—	—	—	—	—
2014–15	Metallurg Magnitogorsk	KHL	41	6	4	10	10	10	1	0	1	0
2015–16	Milwaukee Admirals	AHL	57	15	22	37	35	3	1	0	1	0
2016–17	Milwaukee Admirals	AHL	70	21	30	51	59	3	1	0	1	6
2016–17	Nashville Predators	NHL	2	0	0	0	2	—	—	—	—	—
2017–18	Milwaukee Admirals	AHL	10	3	5	8	25	—	—	—	—	—
2017–18	San Antonio Rampage	AHL	7	0	8	8	2	—	—	—	—	—
2017–18	Colorado Avalanche	NHL	3	0	0	0	0	—	—	—	—	—
2018–19	Colorado Eagles	AHL	2	0	1	1	2	—	—	—	—	—
2018–19	Colorado Avalanche	NHL	23	2	3	5	10	—	—	—	—	—
2019–20	Colorado Avalanche	NHL	38	1	7	8	8	—	—	—	—	—
2020–21	SKA Saint Petersburg	KHL	21	5	0	5	10	10	1	2	3	4
2021–22	SKA Saint Petersburg	KHL	7	0	1	1	0	—	—	—	—	—
2021–22	CSKA Moscow	KHL	27	7	11	18	21	22	5	10	15	8
2022–23	CSKA Moscow	KHL	60	22	19	41	36	27	11	4	15	23
2023–24	CSKA Moscow	KHL	57	16	18	34	30	5	2	1	3	0
2024–25	CSKA Moscow	KHL	63	10	16	26	29	—	—	—	—	—
KHL totals			292	67	69	136	138	74	20	17	37	35
NHL totals			66	3	10	13	20	—	—	—	—	—

Medal record

Ice hockey

Representing Russia

World Junior Championships
Silver medal – second place	2015 Canada	
Silver medal – second place	2016 Finland	

World Junior A Challenge
Silver medal – second place	2013 Yarmouth	

=== International ===
Year	Team	Event	Result	GP	G	A	Pts	PIM
2013	Russia	U17	2nd place, silver medalist(s)	6	0	1	1	0
2013	Russia	IH18	4th	4	0	0	0	2
2014	Russia	U18	5th	5	2	5	7	2
2015	Russia	WJC	2nd place, silver medalist(s)	7	1	3	4	0
2016	Russia	WJC	2nd place, silver medalist(s)	7	5	1	6	32
2021	ROC	WC	5th	6	0	2	2	2
Junior totals				29	8	10	18	36
Senior totals				6	0	2	2	2

== Awards and honors ==
Award	Year
AHL
All-Star Game	2016
KHL
Rookie of the Month (September)	2014
Gagarin Cup (CSKA Moscow)	2022, 2023
