= Daniel Muzito Bagenda =

Swedish ice hockey player (born 1996)

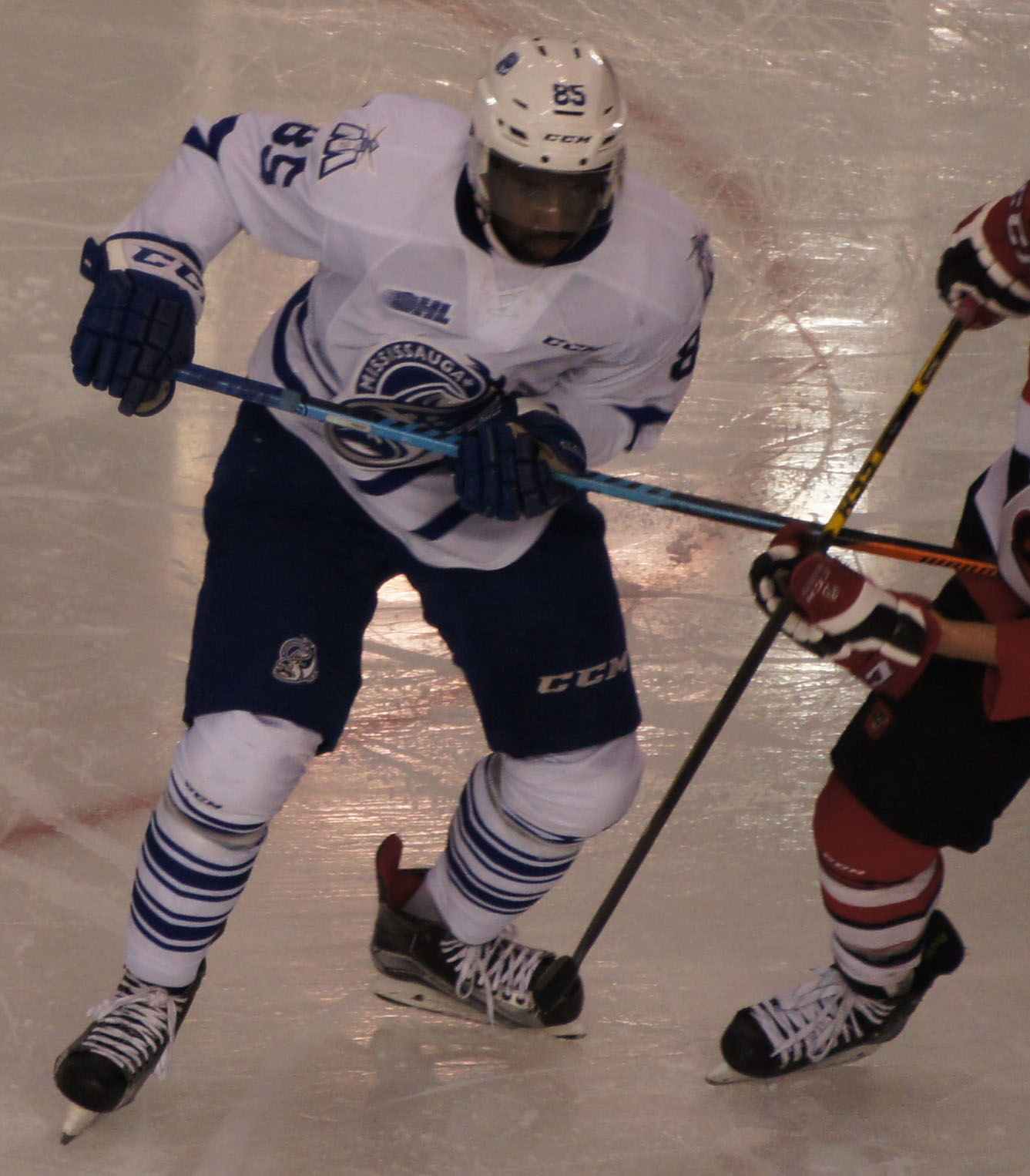
- Born: June 16, 1996 (age 30) Umeå, Sweden
- Height: 6 ft 1 in (185 cm)
- Weight: 198 lb (90 kg; 14 st 2 lb)
- Position: Left wing
- Shoots: Left
- Allsv team Former teams: AIK; Modo Hockey; Rochester Americans; Örebro HK; IK Oskarshamn
- NHL draft: Undrafted
- Playing career: 2014–present

Daniel Muzito Bagenda (born June 16, 1996) is a Swedish professional ice hockey forward. He is currently playing with SSK of the HockeyAllsvenskan (Allsv).

== Playing career ==
Muzito Bagenda made his Swedish Hockey League debut playing with Modo Hockey during the 2013–14 SHL season.

After four games in the SHL as a junior, Bagenda opted to further his development at the Canadian major junior level with the Mississauga Steelheads of the Ontario Hockey League (OHL). In the 2015–16 season with the Steelheads, Bagenda contributed with 20 goals in 63 games before he was passed over in the 2016 NHL entry draft.

On July 3, 2016, Muzito Bagenda signalled the start of his North American professional career, in agreeing to a one-year AHL contract with the Rochester Americans, an affiliate of the Buffalo Sabres.

After two seasons under contract with the Americans, Muzito Bagenda returned to Sweden as a free agent. He agreed to a try-out contract in joining AIK of the HockeyAllsvenskan on August 22, 2018. He made an immediate impact with AIK and was soon signed to a contract for the 2018–19 season. In his first season in the Allsvenskan, Muzito Bagenda used his size and physicality to contribute with 13 goals and 27 points in 52 games.

On April 8, 2019, Muzito Bagenda secured a return to the SHL, signing a two-year contract with Örebro HK.

== Career statistics ==
=== Regular season and playoffs ===
			Regular season					Playoffs
Season	Team	League	GP	G	A	Pts	PIM	GP	G	A	Pts	PIM
2012–13	Modo Hockey	J20	7	1	3	4	6	—	—	—	—	—
2013–14	Modo Hockey	J20	39	15	7	22	48	5	0	0	0	0
2013–14	Modo Hockey	SHL	1	0	0	0	0	—	—	—	—	—
2014–15	Modo Hockey	J20	37	10	25	35	26	5	0	2	2	0
2014–15	Modo Hockey	SHL	3	0	0	0	0	—	—	—	—	—
2015–16	Mississauga Steelheads	OHL	63	20	17	37	36	7	6	4	10	6
2016–17	Rochester Americans	AHL	61	9	6	15	45	—	—	—	—	—
2017–18	Cincinnati Cyclones	ECHL	46	19	27	46	54	5	2	5	7	2
2017–18	Rochester Americans	AHL	6	1	1	2	0	—	—	—	—	—
2018–19	AIK	Allsv	52	13	14	27	36	7	0	0	0	0
2019–20	Örebro HK	SHL	50	7	10	17	20	—	—	—	—	—
2020–21	Örebro HK	SHL	46	5	8	13	33	—	—	—	—	—
2021–22	IK Oskarshamn	SHL	46	4	3	7	18	—	—	—	—	—
2022–23	AIK	Allsv	50	23	17	40	54	8	3	8	11	2
2023–24	AIK	Allsv	49	17	20	37	18	4	0	1	1	29
2024–25	AIK	Allsv	37	8	19	27	25	16	5	3	8	8
SHL totals			146	16	21	37	71	—	—	—	—	—

=== International ===
Year	Team	Event	Result	GP	G	A	Pts	PIM
2013	Sweden	U17	1st place, gold medalist(s)	6	0	3	3	4
2013	Sweden	IH18	7th	4	2	1	3	2
2014	Sweden	U18	4th	7	0	1	1	2
Junior totals				17	2	5	7	8
