= Christián Jaroš =

Slovak ice hockey player (born 1996)

- Born: 2 April 1996 (age 30) Košice, Slovakia
- Height: 6 ft 3 in (191 cm)
- Weight: 201 lb (91 kg; 14 st 5 lb)
- Position: Defence
- Shoots: Right
- KHL team Former teams: Spartak Moscow; Luleå HF; Ottawa Senators; San Jose Sharks; New Jersey Devils; Avangard Omsk; CSKA Moscow; Severstal Cherepovets
- National team: Slovakia
- NHL draft: 139th overall, 2015; Ottawa Senators
- Playing career: 2014–present

Christián Jaroš (born 2 April 1996) is a Slovak professional ice hockey defenceman for HC Spartak Moscow of the Kontinental Hockey League (KHL). Jaroš was drafted 139th overall in the 2015 NHL entry draft by the Ottawa Senators.

== Playing career ==
Jaros made his Swedish Hockey League debut playing with Luleå HF during the 2014–15 SHL season.

On 30 May 2017, Jaroš was signed to a three-year, entry-level contract by the Ottawa Senators. He made his NHL debut on 10 October against the Vancouver Canucks, playing six minutes of the shootout win for the Senators. He only played a total of two games in the NHL that season. He played hockey with Ottowa's American Hockey League (AHL) team, the Belleville Senators, recording 8 points (1 goal and 7 assists) in the 21 games he played until the end of 2017.

Despite beginning the 2018–19 season in the AHL, Jaroš was recalled to the NHL and on 21 November 2018, scored his first career NHL goal in a 6–4 loss to the Minnesota Wild. He finished the 2018–19 season with 61 NHL games, recording nine assists to add to his goal. In spite of that, he started the 2019–20 season in the AHL as well, only making his first NHL appearance against the New York Rangers on 23 November 2019.

On 27 January 2021, Jaroš was traded by the Senators to the San Jose Sharks. He made his debut for the Sharks on 6 April, in a 5–1 loss to the Anaheim Ducks. His first point came four days later, assisting Dylan Gambrell for the first Sharks goal, in a 4–2 defeat by the Los Angeles Kings.

On 26 July 2021, Jaroš was traded by San Jose to the New Jersey Devils in exchange for Nick Merkley. In the following 2021–22 season, he remained on the Devils roster, serving in a depth defenceman role. He appeared in 11 games for the Devils before he was placed on waivers and re-assigned to AHL affiliate, the Utica Comets, at the NHL trade deadline, on 21 March 2022. After failing to report to the AHL, Jaroš was placed on unconditional waivers in order to mutually terminate the remainder of his contract with the Devils on 24 March.

On 9 June 2022, Jaroš signed one-year contract with Avangard Omsk of the Kontinental Hockey League (KHL). In the 2022–23 season, Jaroš featured in 24 games from the blueline for Avangard Omsk, registering three goals and six assists. On 23 December, Jaroš was traded by Avangard Omsk to CSKA Moscow in exchange for Dmitri Alexeyev. He won the Gagarin Cup in 2023 with SKA Moscow, although missed the playoffs due to injury. In the off-season, Jaroš was announced to have left CSKA on 1 July 2023. On 19 October, his KHL rights were traded to Severstal Cherepovets.

After a lone season with Severstal, Jaroš returned for a second stint with former club CSKA Moscow, in signing a one-year contract on 4 July 2024. In the 2024–25 season, Jaroš in a top four pairing role contributed with 2 goals and 12 points in 51 regular season games for CSKA.

As a free agent, Jaroš opted to return to North America by agreeing to a one-year, two-way contract with the Columbus Blue Jackets for the 2025–26 season on 1 July 2025. However, just three months later, Jaroš was waived for the purposes of a mutual termination. He later returned to the KHL, joining Spartak Moscow on an initial one-year agreement on 6 October 2025.

== Personal life ==
Jaroš is a cousin of Erik Černák, who plays for the Tampa Bay Lightning and won a Stanley Cup in 2020 and 2021.

== Career statistics ==
=== Regular season and playoffs ===
			Regular season					Playoffs
Season	Team	League	GP	G	A	Pts	PIM	GP	G	A	Pts	PIM
2010–11	HC Košice	SVK U18	2	0	0	0	0	—	—	—	—	—
2010–11	HK Trebišov	SVK.2 U18	5	0	0	0	0	—	—	—	—	—
2011–12	HC Košice	SVK U18	38	4	10	14	26	—	—	—	—	—
2012–13	HC Košice	SVK U18	15	3	17	20	16	2	0	0	0	0
2013–14	Luleå HF	J18	16	4	8	12	20	—	—	—	—	—
2013–14	Luleå HF	J18 Allsv	18	7	6	13	24	5	0	2	2	6
2013–14	Luleå HF	J20	3	1	3	4	0	—	—	—	—	—
2014–15	Luleå HF	J20	23	4	8	12	74	3	0	1	1	6
2014–15	Luleå HF	SHL	25	0	1	1	6	—	—	—	—	—
2014–15	Asplöven HC	Allsv	6	0	1	1	0	—	—	—	—	—
2015–16	Luleå HF	SHL	25	0	5	5	45	10	0	3	3	20
2015–16	Asplöven HC	Allsv	22	2	3	5	53	—	—	—	—	—
2016–17	Luleå HF	SHL	36	5	8	13	22	—	—	—	—	—
2017–18	Belleville Senators	AHL	44	3	13	16	43	—	—	—	—	—
2017–18	Ottawa Senators	NHL	2	0	0	0	0	—	—	—	—	—
2018–19	Ottawa Senators	NHL	61	1	9	10	27	—	—	—	—	—
2018–19	Belleville Senators	AHL	1	0	0	0	0	—	—	—	—	—
2019–20	Belleville Senators	AHL	34	2	13	15	14	—	—	—	—	—
2019–20	Ottawa Senators	NHL	13	0	3	3	6	—	—	—	—	—
2020–21	San Jose Barracuda	AHL	11	0	3	3	2	—	—	—	—	—
2020–21	San Jose Sharks	NHL	7	0	1	1	2	—	—	—	—	—
2021–22	New Jersey Devils	NHL	11	0	0	0	2	—	—	—	—	—
2022–23	Avangard Omsk	KHL	24	3	6	9	4	—	—	—	—	—
2022–23	CSKA Moscow	KHL	16	0	3	3	12	—	—	—	—	—
2023–24	Severstal Cherepovets	KHL	41	3	15	18	14	3	1	0	1	2
2024–25	CSKA Moscow	KHL	51	2	10	12	18	6	0	0	0	2
2025–26	Spartak Moscow	KHL	41	1	11	12	31	5	0	1	1	0
NHL totals			94	1	13	14	37	—	—	—	—	—
KHL totals			173	9	45	54	79	14	1	1	2	4

Medal record

Representing Slovakia

Ice hockey

World Junior Championships
Bronze medal – third place	2015 Canada	

=== International ===
Year	Team	Event	Result	GP	G	A	Pts	PIM
2013	Slovakia	IH18	8th	4	1	1	2	2
2014	Slovakia	WJC18	8th	5	1	1	2	6
2015	Slovakia	WJC	3rd place, bronze medalist(s)	7	0	1	1	8
2016	Slovakia	WJC	7th	5	1	1	2	2
2016	Slovakia	WC	9th	5	2	0	2	10
2018	Slovakia	WC	9th	7	1	0	1	0
2019	Slovakia	WC	9th	4	0	2	2	2
2021	Slovakia	OGQ	Q	3	0	0	0	22
Junior totals				21	3	4	7	18
Senior totals				19	3	2	5	34

== Awards and honours ==
Award	Year
KHL
Gagarin Cup champion	2023
