= Stefan Loibl =

German ice hockey player

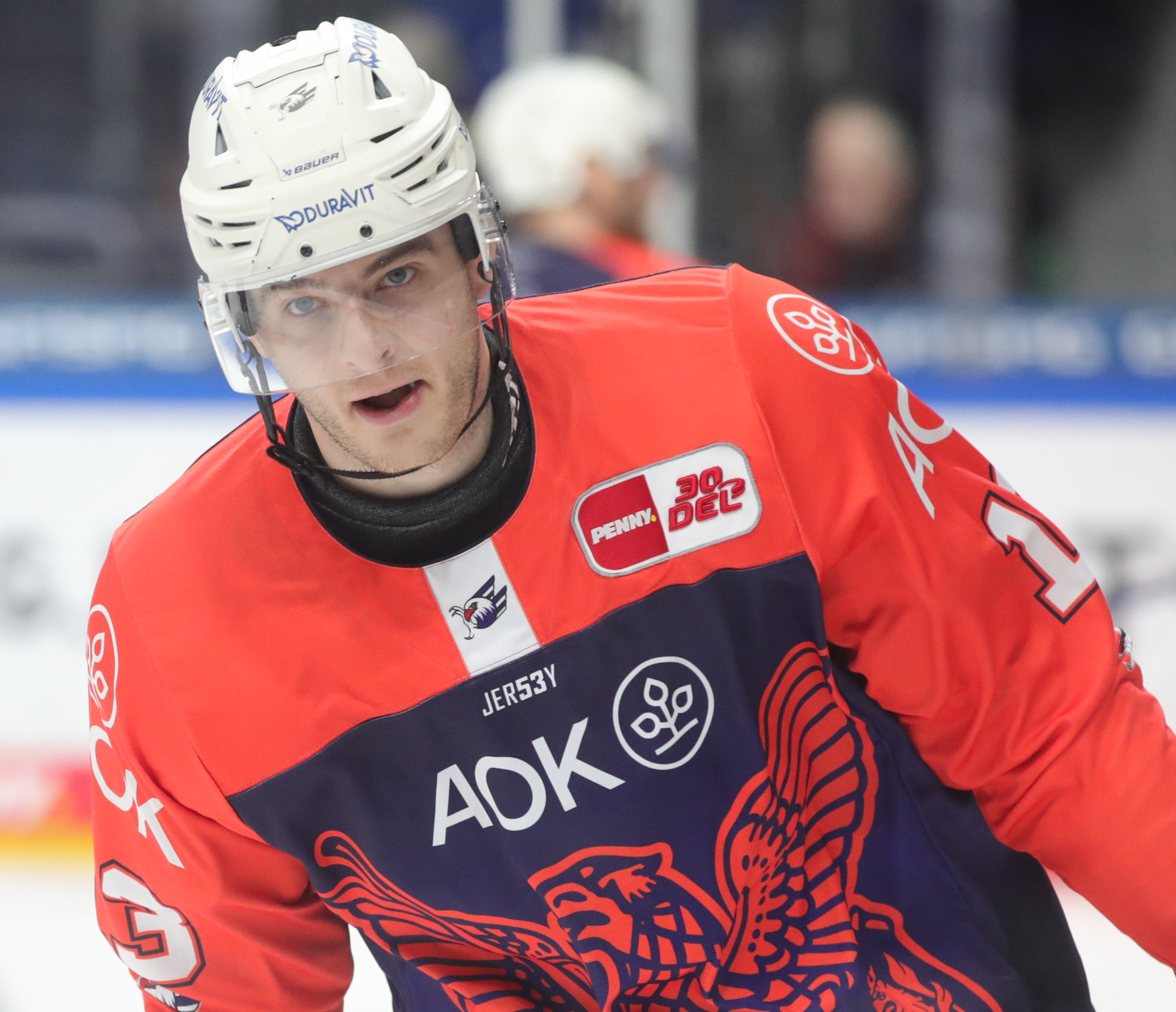
- Loibl in 2023
- Born: 24 June 1996 (age 30) Straubing, Germany
- Height: 1.86 m (6 ft 1 in)
- Weight: 83 kg (183 lb; 13 st 1 lb)
- Position: Forward
- Shoots: Left
- DEL team Former teams: Straubing Tigers; Adler Mannheim; Skellefteå AIK
- National team: Germany
- Playing career: 2013–present

Stefan Loibl (born 24 June 1996) is a German professional ice hockey player who is a forward for the Straubing Tigers of the Deutsche Eishockey Liga (DEL).

== Playing career ==
Loibl played six seasons in the DEL with the Straubing Tigers, before leaving out of contract to sign a three-year deal with Adler Mannheim on 7 August 2020.

== International play ==
He represented Germany at the 2019 IIHF World Championship.

On 25 January 2022, Loibl was selected to play for Team Germany at the 2022 Winter Olympics.

== Career statistics ==
=== International ===
Year	Team	Event	GP	G	A	Pts	PIM
2014	Germany	U18	6	2	2	4	0
2016	Germany	WJC-D1	5	1	4	5	2
2019	Germany	WC	3	0	0	0	0
2021	Germany	WC	10	1	3	4	0
2022	Germany	OLY	4	0	0	0	0
2022	Germany	WC	8	1	2	3	0
2026	Germany	WC	7	1	3	4	0
Junior totals			11	3	6	9	2
Senior totals			32	3	8	11	0
