= Noah Rod =

Swiss professional ice hockey player (born 1996)

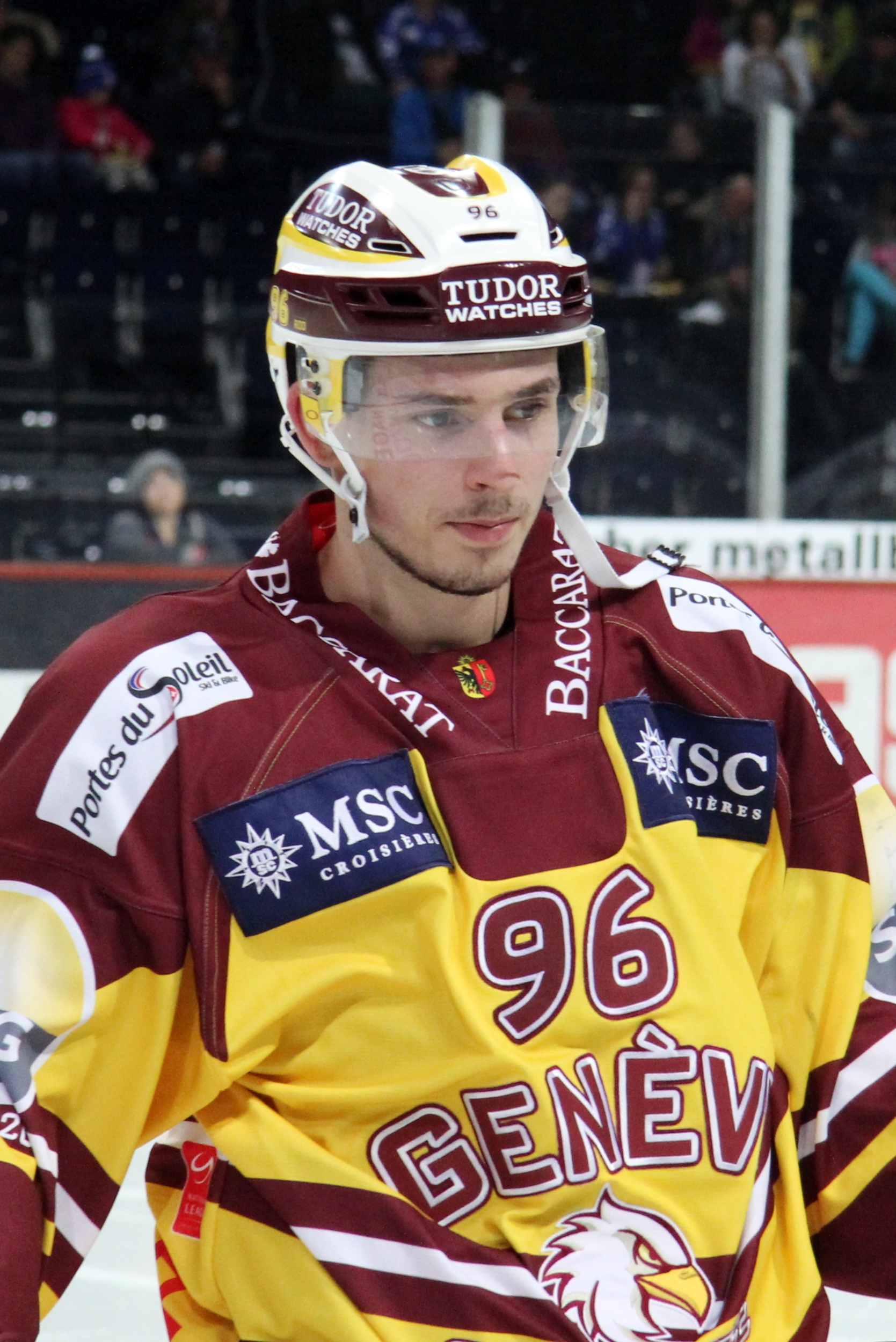
- Rod with Genève-Servette HC in 2014
- Born: 7 June 1996 (age 30) La Chaux-de-Fonds, Switzerland
- Height: 6 ft 1 in (185 cm)
- Weight: 192 lb (87 kg; 13 st 10 lb)
- Position: Right wing
- Shoots: Left
- NL team Former teams: Genève-Servette HC; San Jose Barracuda
- National team: Switzerland
- NHL draft: 53rd overall, 2014; San Jose Sharks
- Playing career: 2013–present

Noah Rod (born 7 June 1996) is a Swiss professional ice hockey right winger who currently serves as captain of Genève-Servette HC of the National League (NL). Rod was selected by the San Jose Sharks in the second round (53rd overall) of the 2014 NHL entry draft.

== Playing career ==
Rod made his National League A debut playing with Genève-Servette HC during the 2013–14 NLA season, signing a one-year contract. In 2014, he was selected by the San Jose Sharks in the second round (53rd overall) of the 2014 NHL entry draft.

On 5 October 2016, Rod agreed to a five-year contract extension with Geneva with an NHL-out clause.

At the conclusion of Genève-Servette's 2016–17 season after a first round sweep in the post-season, Rod used his out-clause in signing a three-year entry-level contract with the San Jose Sharks of the National Hockey League on 23 March 2017. After sorting out immigration visa issues, Rod was assigned to affiliate for the playoff run of the San Jose Barracuda of the American Hockey League (AHL).

At the end of the 2016–17 season, Rod stated that he would no longer play in the AHL, considering the league too weak compared to the National League. Should he not make the Sharks roster at the end of training camp, he would then rejoin Genève-Servette. After participating in the Sharks training camp and pre-season, Rod was reassigned on loan back to Genève-Servette on 25 September 2017. In the off-season following the 2017–18 season, Rod was placed on unconditional waivers and mutually terminated his contract with the Sharks on July 17, 2018, after he refused to play in the AHL. That same day, he was named captain of Genève-Servette HC and signed through the 2023–24 season with the team.

On September 16, 2019, Rod was suspended for 2 games and fined CHF 3,900 after an illegal check against SCL Tigers's Loic In-Albon during the first regular season game on September 14, 2019.

On January 17, 2020, Rod was suspended for 4 games and fined CHF 6,400 following a hit to the head of Alessio Bertaggia in a game against HC Lugano on January 14, 2020.

On February 13, 2024, Rod hurt his shoulder following an awkward fall into the boards. On February 16, 2024, it was announced that his injury required surgery, forcing him to miss the remainder of the season.

During the summer of 2024, it was announced that Rod's injury will likely force him to sit out the entire 2024/25 season. Roger Karrer assumed the team's captaincy during this season. Rod eventually made his comeback on August 18, 2025 in a preseason game against the Fischtown Pinguins in Yverdon-les-Bains. On August 20, 2025 he scored a goal during an other preseason contest to a standing ovation from the sold out Patinoire des Vergers.

== International play ==
Medal record

Representing Switzerland

Ice hockey

World Championships
Silver medal – second place	2018 Denmark	

Rod represented the Swiss National junior team at multiple tournaments. The first time he was selected to play for Switzerland men's national team, was during the 2016 Deutschland Cup.

Rod won silver with Switzerland at the 2018 IIHF World Championship in Denmark. He appeared in all 10 games of the tournament (0 point). The next year, Rod was also named to the team for the 2019 IIHF World Championship in Slovakia.

== Personal life ==
Rod is the son of former National League player Jean-Luc Rod who spent most of his career with HC Fribourg-Gottéron.

His brother, Julien, is currently under contract with HC Fribourg-Gottéron in the Swiss U20 league.

== Career statistics ==
=== Regular season and playoffs ===
			Regular season					Playoffs
Season	Team	League	GP	G	A	Pts	PIM	GP	G	A	Pts	PIM
2011–12	Genève-Servette HC	Elite. A	14	0	1	1	14	—	—	—	—	—
2012–13	Genève-Servette HC	Elite. A	33	14	17	31	62	—	—	—	—	—
2013–14	Genève-Servette HC	Elite. A	31	16	21	37	58	2	0	1	1	29
2013–14	Genève-Servette HC	NLA	28	1	2	3	8	12	1	3	4	4
2014–15	Genève-Servette HC	NLA	38	1	3	4	22	10	2	1	3	6
2015–16	Genève-Servette HC	Elite. A	3	1	6	7	4	—	—	—	—	—
2015–16	Genève-Servette HC	NLA	44	7	9	16	12	6	2	2	4	4
2016–17	Genève-Servette HC	NLA	27	5	9	14	22	4	0	0	0	2
2016–17	San Jose Barracuda	AHL	2	0	1	1	0	5	0	0	0	0
2017–18	Genève-Servette HC	NL	25	7	2	9	38	3	1	2	3	2
2017–18	San Jose Barracuda	AHL	9	1	3	4	2	—	—	—	—	—
2018–19	Genève-Servette HC	NL	44	11	10	21	30	6	1	4	5	2
2019–20	Genève-Servette HC	NL	44	14	12	26	57	—	—	—	—	—
2020–21	Genève-Servette HC	NL	45	18	9	27	20	10	5	1	6	4
2021–22	Genève-Servette HC	NL	27	4	11	15	6	2	1	0	1	0
2022–23	Genève-Servette HC	NL	45	11	9	20	22	11	1	0	1	2
NL totals			367	79	76	155	237	64	14	13	27	26

=== International ===
Year	Team	Event	Result	GP	G	A	Pts	PIM
2014	Switzerland	IH18	7th	4	0	1	1	2
2014	Switzerland	U18	7th	5	2	4	6	22
2015	Switzerland	WJC	9th	6	3	3	6	2
2016	Switzerland	WJC	9th	6	4	2	6	6
2018	Switzerland	WC	2nd place, silver medalist(s)	10	0	0	0	4
2019	Switzerland	WC	8th	8	0	1	1	2
2021	Switzerland	WC	6th	5	0	0	0	2
Junior totals				21	9	10	19	32
Senior totals				23	0	1	1	8
