= Kevin Elgestål =

Swedish ice hockey player (born 1996)

- Born: May 29, 1996 (age 29) Gothenburg, Sweden
- Height: 6 ft 1 in (185 cm)
- Weight: 198 lb (90 kg; 14 st 2 lb)
- Position: Right wing
- Shoots: Right
- Div.3 team Former teams: Stenungsund HF; Frölunda HC; DVTK Jegesmedvék
- NHL draft: 194th overall, 2014; Washington Capitals
- Playing career: 2013–present

Kevin Elgestål (born May 29, 1996) is a Swedish professional ice hockey right winger. He is currently playing with Stenungsund HF in the Hockeytvåan (Div.3).

== Playing career ==
Elgestål made his Swedish Hockey League debut playing with Frölunda HC during the 2013–14 SHL season.

On June 26, 2014, Elgestål was drafted in the 7th round of the 2014 NHL entry draft, 194th overall, by the Washington Capitals of the National Hockey League (NHL).

Elgestål continued his tenure with Frölunda HC, however after being un-signed by the Capitals and also unable to break into the SHL team, he left the club to sign with second-tier club, HC Vita Hästen, in the HockeyAllsvenskan (Allsv).

== Career statistics ==
=== Regular season and playoffs ===
			Regular season					Playoffs
Season	Team	League	GP	G	A	Pts	PIM	GP	G	A	Pts	PIM
2012–13	Frölunda HC	J20	5	1	0	1	2	—	—	—	—	—
2013–14	Frölunda HC	J20	44	13	22	35	34	3	1	0	1	2
2013–14	Frölunda HC	SHL	2	0	1	1	0	—	—	—	—	—
2014–15	Frölunda HC	J20	33	10	16	26	65	6	2	5	7	29
2015–16	Frölunda HC	J20	16	6	6	12	28	—	—	—	—	—
2015–16	HC Vita Hästen	Allsv	27	3	2	5	10	—	—	—	—	—
2016–17	HC Vita Hästen	Allsv	30	4	1	5	29	—	—	—	—	—
2017–18	HC Vita Hästen	Allsv	49	7	6	13	22	—	—	—	—	—
2018–19	HC Vita Hästen	Allsv	47	5	7	12	20	—	—	—	—	—
2019–20	HC Vita Hästen	Allsv	52	8	10	18	22	1	0	0	0	0
2020–21	HC Vita Hästen	Allsv	23	1	1	2	6	—	—	—	—	—
2021–22	HC Vita Hästen	Allsv	1	0	0	0	0	—	—	—	—	—
2021–22	DVTK Jegesmedvék	Erste	29	8	14	22	33	9	4	1	5	2
SHL totals			2	0	1	1	0	—	—	—	—	—

=== International ===
Year	Team	Event	Result	GP	G	A	Pts	PIM
2013	Sweden	IH18	7th	4	2	0	2	2
2014	Sweden	WJC18	4th	7	1	2	3	27
Junior totals				11	3	2	5	29
