= Jack Dougherty (ice hockey) =

American ice hockey player

- Born: May 25, 1996 (age 30) Saint Paul, Minnesota, U.S.
- Height: 6 ft 1 in (185 cm)
- Weight: 186 lb (84 kg; 13 st 4 lb)
- Position: Defense
- Shoots: Right
- EIHL team Former teams: Sheffield Steelers; Milwaukee Admirals; Rochester Americans; Belleville Senators; Providence Bruins; Kölner Haie; Nürnberg Ice Tigers; Vienna Capitals
- NHL draft: 51st overall, 2014; Nashville Predators
- Playing career: 2016–present

Jack Dougherty (born May 25, 1996) is an American professional ice hockey defenseman for the Sheffield Steelers of the Elite Ice Hockey League (EIHL). Dougherty was selected by the Nashville Predators in the second round (51st overall) of the 2014 NHL entry draft.

== Playing career ==
Dougherty was born in Saint Paul, Minnesota, but grew up in Cottage Grove, Minnesota. He was rated as a top prospect who was projected as a possible first round selection in the 2014 NHL Entry Draft. He trained with the USA Hockey National Team Development Program team during the 2013–14 season, and was invited to participate in the 2013 CCM/USA Hockey All-American Prospects Game. In October 2013 he committed to play for the Wisconsin Badgers men's ice hockey team of the NCAA Big Ten Conference.

On July 24, 2015, Dougherty signed a three-year entry-level contract with the Predators. As a result, Dougherty was sent to the Portland Winterhawks of the Western Hockey League, the team which held his major junior rights.

Prior to the 2018–19 season, on October 1, 2018, Dougherty was traded by the Predators to the Buffalo Sabres in exchange for Nicholas Baptiste. With the Sabres' AHL affiliate, the Rochester Americans, he compiled 2 goals and 10 assists for 12 points in 56 games from the blueline.

Following the conclusion of his entry-level deal with the Sabres, on June 25, 2019, Dougherty was not tendered a qualifying offer by Buffalo, releasing him to free agency. On July 10, 2019, Dougherty agreed to a one-year AHL contract with the Belleville Senators, affiliate to the Ottawa Senators, on July 10, 2019.

Having left the Senators organization as a free agent, Dougherty was signed to a one-year AHL contract with the Providence Bruins on September 30, 2021, and was invited to the Boston Bruins training camp on a professional try-out. He appeared in just one game with Providence to start the 2020–21 season, before he was later returned in a trade for future considerations to former club, the Belleville Senators, on November 23, 2021.

Unable to secure an AHL contract for the 2022–23 season, Dougherty was signed as a free agent to a contract with the Orlando Solar Bears of the ECHL on October 12, 2022. Following 19 games with the Bears, Dougherty returned to the Belleville Senators in the AHL, making 15 further regular season appearances.

On February 16, 2023, having left the AHL, Dougherty was immediately signed for the remainder of the 2022–23 season, by German club Kölner Haie of the DEL. He made just two appearances during his tenure with the Sharks going scoreless.

As a free agent, Dougherty opted to continue in the DEL, signing a one-year contract with the Nürnberg Ice Tigers on July 26, 2023.

Following a season in the ICE Hockey League with the Vienna Capitals, Dougherty moved to England in signing a contract with the Sheffield Steelers of the EIHL on July 21, 2025.

== International play ==
As a 16-year-old he was named to the USA U17 Select team to play in the 2012 Five Nations Cup tournament held in the Czech Republic in August 2012. As a 17-year-old, Dougherty was chosen to compete with the American U-18 squad at the 2013 Ivan Hlinka Memorial Tournament where he won a silver medal, and he also helped Team USA capture the gold medal at the 2014 IIHF World U18 Championships.

== Career statistics ==
=== Regular season and playoffs ===
			Regular season					Playoffs
Season	Team	League	GP	G	A	Pts	PIM	GP	G	A	Pts	PIM
2011–12	St. Thomas Academy	USHS	24	0	9	9	8	3	0	0	0	0
2012–13	St. Thomas Academy	USHS	25	3	21	24	16	3	2	3	5	0
2013–14	U.S. National Development Team	USHL	23	4	8	12	34	—	—	—	—	—
2014–15	University of Wisconsin	B1G	33	2	7	9	29	—	—	—	—	—
2015–16	Portland Winterhawks	WHL	68	11	41	52	71	4	0	2	2	6
2015–16	Milwaukee Admirals	AHL	3	0	1	1	2	—	—	—	—	—
2016–17	Milwaukee Admirals	AHL	75	2	11	13	32	3	0	0	0	4
2017–18	Milwaukee Admirals	AHL	63	1	11	12	36	—	—	—	—	—
2018–19	Rochester Americans	AHL	56	2	10	12	32	—	—	—	—	—
2019–20	Belleville Senators	AHL	59	4	11	15	34	—	—	—	—	—
2020–21	Belleville Senators	AHL	29	0	5	5	6	—	—	—	—	—
2021–22	Providence Bruins	AHL	1	0	0	0	0	—	—	—	—	—
2021–22	Belleville Senators	AHL	13	0	2	2	2	—	—	—	—	—
2022–23	Orlando Solar Bears	ECHL	19	1	6	7	16	—	—	—	—	—
2022–23	Belleville Senators	AHL	15	0	2	2	8	—	—	—	—	—
2022–23	Kölner Haie	DEL	2	0	0	0	0	—	—	—	—	—
2023–24	Nürnberg Ice Tigers	DEL	29	2	9	11	8	1	0	1	1	2
2024–25	Vienna Capitals	ICEHL	43	0	11	11	18	3	1	0	1	0
2025–26	Sheffield Steelers	EIHL	49	2	13	15	18	4	0	0	0	0
AHL totals			314	9	53	62	152	3	0	0	0	4

=== International ===
Year	Team	Event	Result	GP	G	A	Pts	PIM
2013	United States	IH18	2nd place, silver medalist(s)	5	1	2	3	10
2014	United States	U18	1st place, gold medalist(s)	7	2	2	4	0
Junior totals				12	3	4	7	10

== Awards and honors ==
Honors	Year	Ref
Ivan Hlinka Memorial Tournament silver medal	2013	
CCM/USA Hockey All-American Prospects Game	2013	
IIHF World U18 Championship gold medal	2014	
