= Dominik Mašín =

Czech ice hockey player

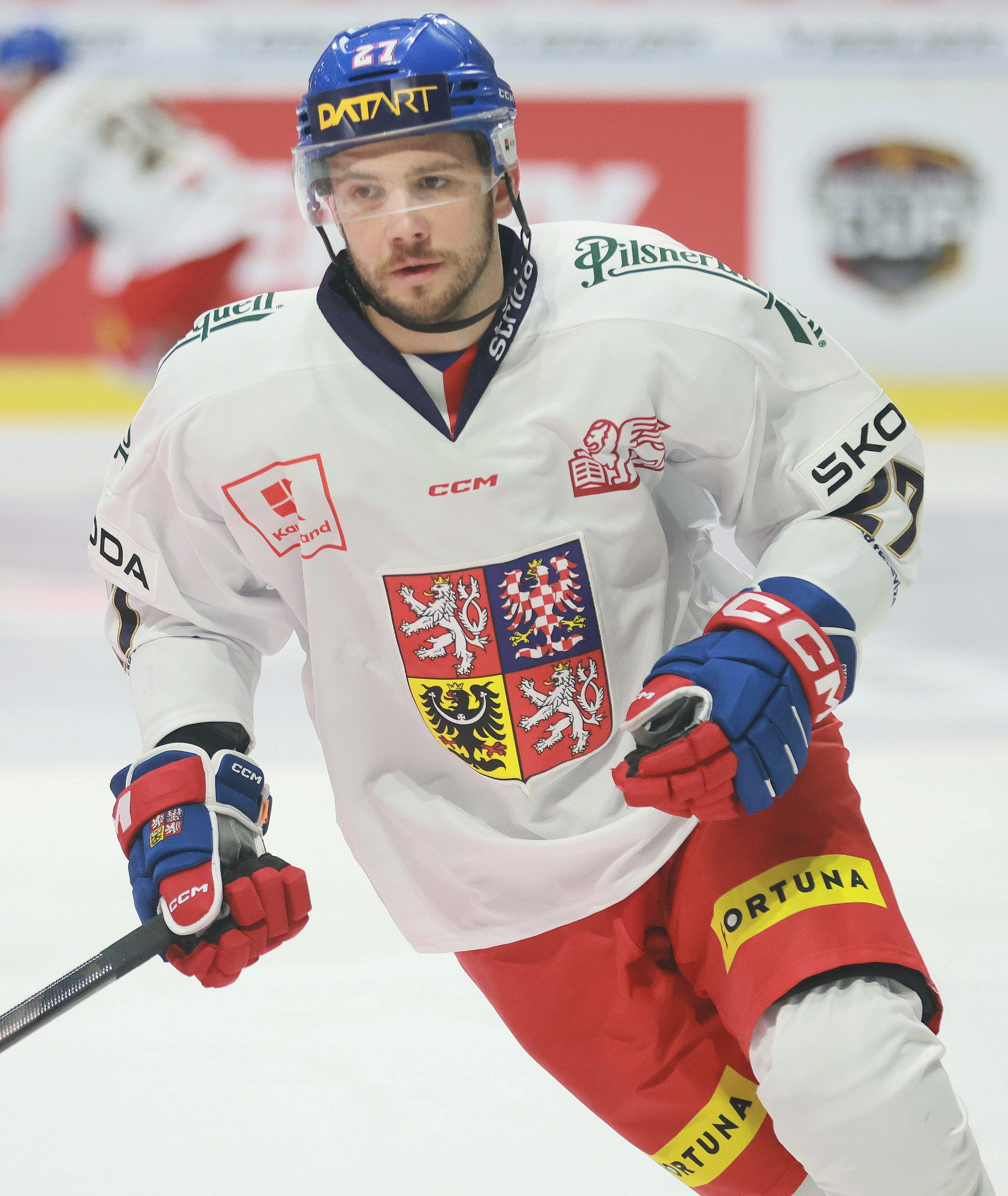
- Mašín in 2025
- Born: 1 February 1996 (age 30) Městec Králové, Czech Republic
- Height: 6 ft 2 in (188 cm)
- Weight: 200 lb (91 kg; 14 st 4 lb)
- Position: Defence
- Shoots: Left
- Liiga team Former teams: Ilves; Syracuse Crunch; Amur Khabarovsk
- NHL draft: 35th overall, 2014; Tampa Bay Lightning
- Playing career: 2016–present

Dominik Mašín (born 1 February 1996) is a Czech professional ice hockey defenceman who is currently playing with Ilves of the Liiga. He formerly played as a prospect to the Tampa Bay Lightning of the National Hockey League (NHL).

== Playing career ==
=== Juniors ===
Mašín was rated as a top prospect who was ranked 18th on the NHL Central Scouting Bureau's mid-term ranking of International skaters, rising to the 10th spot with the release of their final rankings in April 2014. He was selected by the Tampa Bay Lightning in the second round (35th overall) of the 2014 NHL entry draft.

During the 2013–14 season, Mašín was the Czech U20's most penalized player with 102 penalty minutes.

=== Professional ===
On 13 October 2015, the Lightning signed Mašín to a three-year, entry-level contract.

He made his professional debut with the Syracuse Crunch on 9 April 2016 following the conclusion of his junior season. In four games with the Crunch at the end of the 2015-16 AHL season, he posted zero points and a +1 rating.

Following his fifth season with the Syracuse Crunch, Mašín placed 6th in all-time games played with the Crunch, with 58 points and 303 penalty minutes in 273 games.

On 1 July 2020, a report surfaced that Mašín would sign as a restricted free agent from the Lightning with Russian club, Amur Khabarovsk of the Kontinental Hockey League (KHL). It was later confirmed by the club on 7 August 2020.

In his second season with Amur in 2021–22, Mašín went scoreless in 15 regular season games before leaving the club and transferring for the remainder of the year to Finnish club Ilves of the Liiga, on 14 October 2021.

On June 23, 2022, Mašín secured a one-year contract extension to continue with Ilves in the 2022–23 season.

== International play ==
As a member of the Czech Republic men's national junior ice hockey team, Mašín participated at the 2013 European Youth Olympic Winter Festival, and captained the Czech team at the 2013 Ivan Hlinka Memorial Tournament, and at the 2013 World Junior A Challenge.

== Career statistics ==
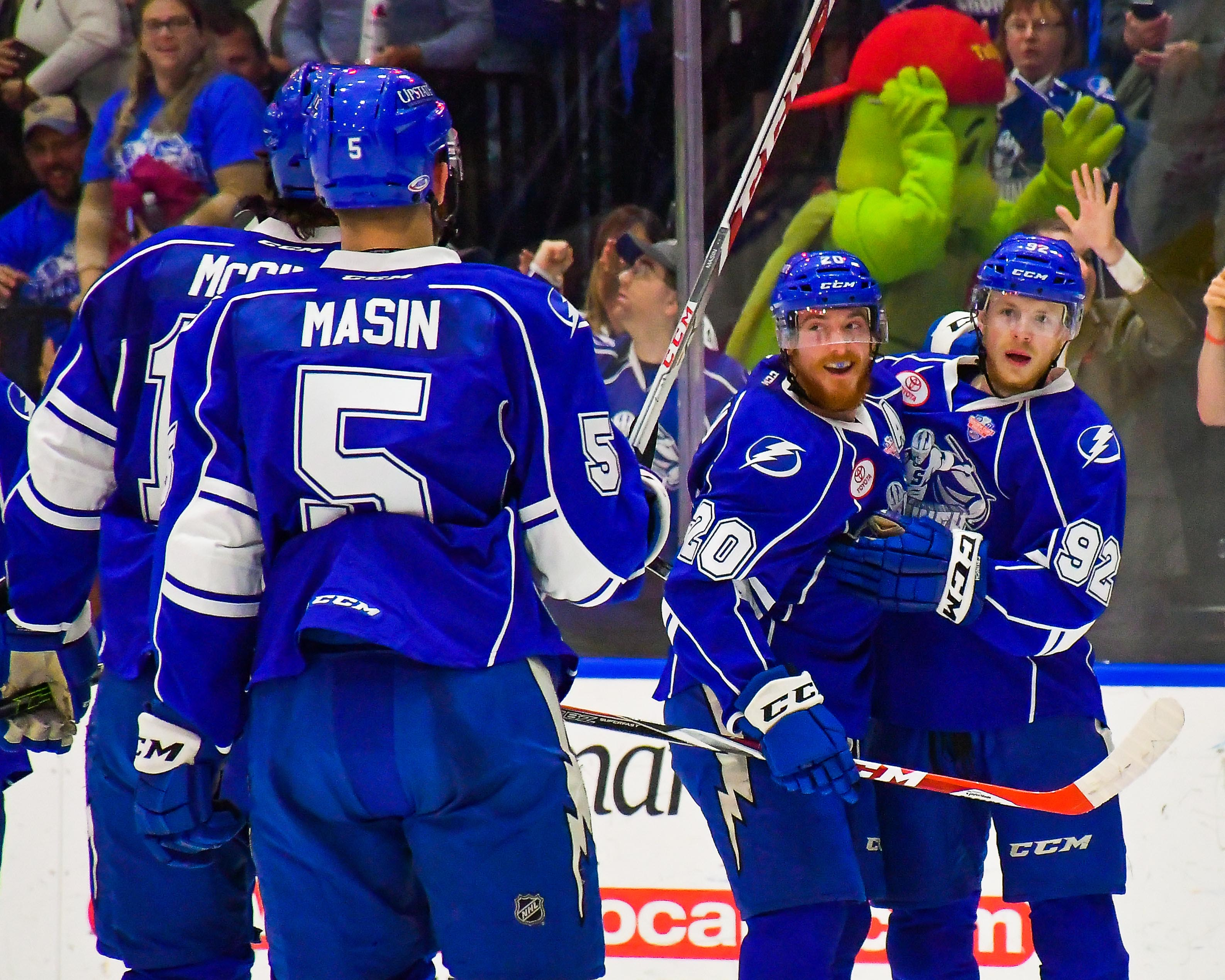
Mašín during the Calder Cup finals in 2017.

=== Regular season and playoffs ===
			Regular season					Playoffs
Season	Team	League	GP	G	A	Pts	PIM	GP	G	A	Pts	PIM
2010–11	HC Slavia Praha	CZE U18	16	1	2	3	18	3	0	1	1	2
2011–12	HC Slavia Praha	CZE U18	34	0	3	3	30	—	—	—	—	—
2012–13	HC Slavia Praha	CZE U18	12	3	3	6	41	2	0	0	0	4
2012–13	HC Slavia Praha	CZE U20	25	1	2	3	16	—	—	—	—	—
2013–14	HC Slavia Praha	CZE U20	39	2	19	21	102	5	1	1	2	33
2013–14	HC Slavia Praha	CZE U18	—	—	—	—	—	2	1	0	1	2
2014–15	Peterborough Petes	OHL	48	7	19	26	70	—	—	—	—	—
2015–16	Peterborough Petes	OHL	57	8	32	40	50	7	0	3	3	12
2015–16	Syracuse Crunch	AHL	4	0	0	0	0	—	—	—	—	—
2016–17	Syracuse Crunch	AHL	69	3	3	6	73	22	0	2	2	16
2017–18	Syracuse Crunch	AHL	72	9	15	24	79	7	1	2	3	10
2018–19	Syracuse Crunch	AHL	69	2	10	12	72	4	0	0	0	0
2019–20	Syracuse Crunch	AHL	59	2	14	16	79	—	—	—	—	—
2020–21	Amur Khabarovsk	KHL	32	2	9	11	31	—	—	—	—	—
2021–22	Amur Khabarovsk	KHL	15	0	0	0	16	—	—	—	—	—
2021–22	Ilves	Liiga	44	1	10	11	67	12	0	1	1	6
2022–23	Ilves	Liiga	36	4	4	8	26	—	—	—	—	—
AHL totals			273	16	42	58	303	33	1	4	5	26
KHL totals			47	2	9	11	47	—	—	—	—	—

=== International ===
Year	Team	Event	Result	GP	G	A	Pts	PIM
2013	Czech Republic	IH18	3rd place, bronze medalist(s)	4	0	0	0	4
2014	Czech Republic	WJC18	2nd place, silver medalist(s)	7	0	3	3	6
2015	Czech Republic	WJC	6th	5	0	1	1	2
2016	Czech Republic	WJC	5th	5	1	1	2	0
Junior totals				21	1	5	6	12
