= Radek Veselý =

Czech ice hockey player

- Born: May 5, 1996 (age 30) Pelhřimov, Czech Republic
- Height: 6 ft 0 in (183 cm)
- Weight: 189 lb (86 kg; 13 st 7 lb)
- Position: Forward
- Shoots: Left
- team Former teams: Free Agent; Piráti Chomutov; HC Litvínov; AZ Havířov; Coventry Blaze
- Playing career: 2014–present

Radek Veselý (born May 5, 1996) is a Czech professional ice hockey player currently signed to Romanian Erste Liga on HSC Csíkszereda. He last played for Coventry Blaze in the UK's Elite Ice Hockey League (EIHL). Veselý was previously with AZ Havířov of the Czech 1.liga.

Veselý made his Czech Extraliga debut playing with Piráti Chomutov during the 2015-16 Czech Extraliga season.
