= Henrik Törnqvist =

Swedish ice hockey player

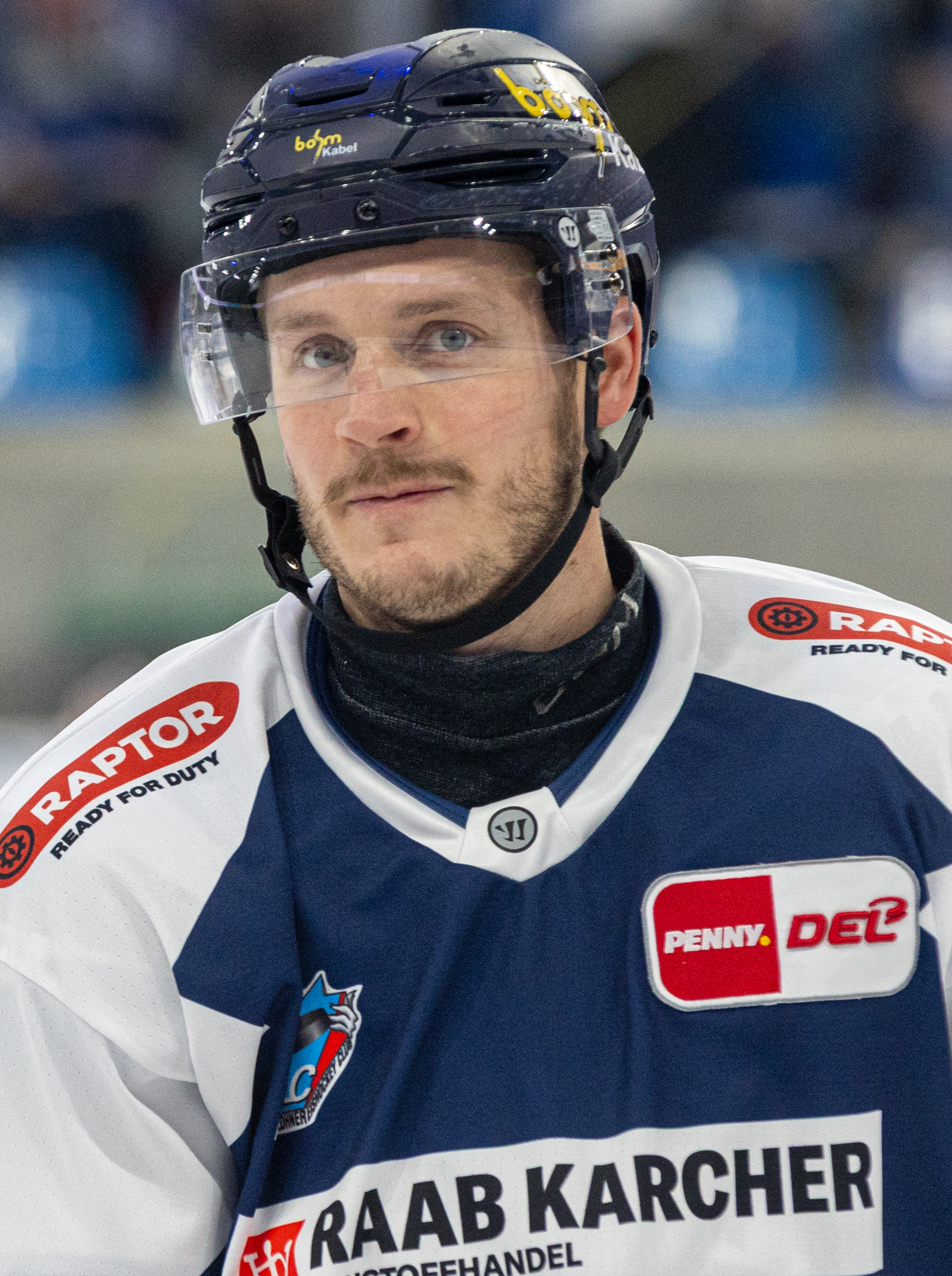
- Henrik Törnqvist with the Iserlohn Roosters in 2025
- Born: August 25, 1996 (age 30) Motala, Sweden
- Height: 6 ft 2 in (188 cm)
- Weight: 187 lb (85 kg; 13 st 5 lb)
- Position: Right wing
- Shoots: Right
- Liiga team Former teams: Oulun Kärpät; Linköping HC; Karlskrona HK; Timrå IK; Iserlohn Roosters
- Playing career: 2014–present

Henrik Törnqvist (born August 25, 1996) is a Swedish professional ice hockey player. He is currently playing with Oulun Kärpät of the Finnish Liiga.

== Playing career ==
Törnqvist made his Swedish Hockey League debut playing with Linköping HC during the 2014–15 SHL season.

In the 2018–19 season, Törnqvist joined Timrå IK, and made 51 appearances, scoring a career best 9 goals, 23 assists for 32 points. Unable to prevent Timrå IK from relegation, Törnqvist returned for a third stint with original club, Linköping HC, securing a three-year contract on 21 April 2019.
