= Matej Paločko =

Slovak ice hockey defenceman

- Born: 26 May 1996 (age 29) Košice, Slovakia
- Height: 5 ft 10 in (178 cm)
- Weight: 176 lb (80 kg; 12 st 8 lb)
- Position: Forward
- Shoots: Left
- Slovak team Former teams: HK Poprad; HC Bílí Tygři Liberec; HC Benátky nad Jizerou; HK Spišská Nová Ves; Nice hockey Côte d'Azur
- Playing career: 2013–present

Matej Paločko (born 26 May 1996) is a Slovak professional ice hockey forward currently playing for HK Poprad of the Slovak Extraliga.

== Career ==
Paločko began his career with HK Poprad, playing in their various Jr. teams in 2013. After that he played in Jr. teams for HC Bílí Tygři Liberec between 2014 and 2016.

Paločko previously played for HC Benátky nad Jizerou, HK Spišská Nová Ves and Nice hockey Côte d'Azur of the Ligue Magnus.

== Career statistics ==
=== Regular season and playoffs ===
			Regular season					Playoffs
Season	Team	League	GP	G	A	Pts	PIM	GP	G	A	Pts	PIM

=== International ===
Year	Team	Event	Result	GP	G	A	Pts	PIM
