= Juraj Milý =

Slovak ice hockey winger

- Born: 9 December 1996 (age 29) Prešov, Slovakia
- Height: 5.4 ft 4 in (175 cm)
- Weight: 170 lb (77 kg; 12 st 2 lb)
- Position: Winger
- Shoots: Right
- Slovenská hokejová liga team Former teams: HC Prešov; HK Orange 20; HC Košice; HC Prešov Penguins; HC 07 Detva; MsHK Žilina; HC 19 Humenné; HC 21 Prešov
- Playing career: 2015–present

Juraj Milý (born 9 December 1996) is a Slovak professional ice hockey winger currently playing for HK Steel Team Trebišov of the Slovenská hokejová liga.

== Career ==
Milý was drafted 14th overall in the 2014 CHL Import Draft by the Acadie-Bathurst Titan of the Quebec Major Junior Hockey League. After scoring just one goal in nineteen games, he left the team and spent the remainder of the 2014–15 season with the Muskegon Lumberjacks of the United States Hockey League.

He then returned to Slovakia for the 2015–16 season, joining the HK Orange 20 junior project and HC Košice of the Tipsport Liga, as well as HC Prešov Penguins of the Slovak 1. Liga. He joined HC 07 Detva in 2017. He signed a contract with Detva on May 1, 2018, before joining MsHK Žilina on October 20, 2018. On May 13, 2019, Milý rejoined HC Košice again.
