= Alexander Trushkov =

Russian ice hockey player (born 1996)

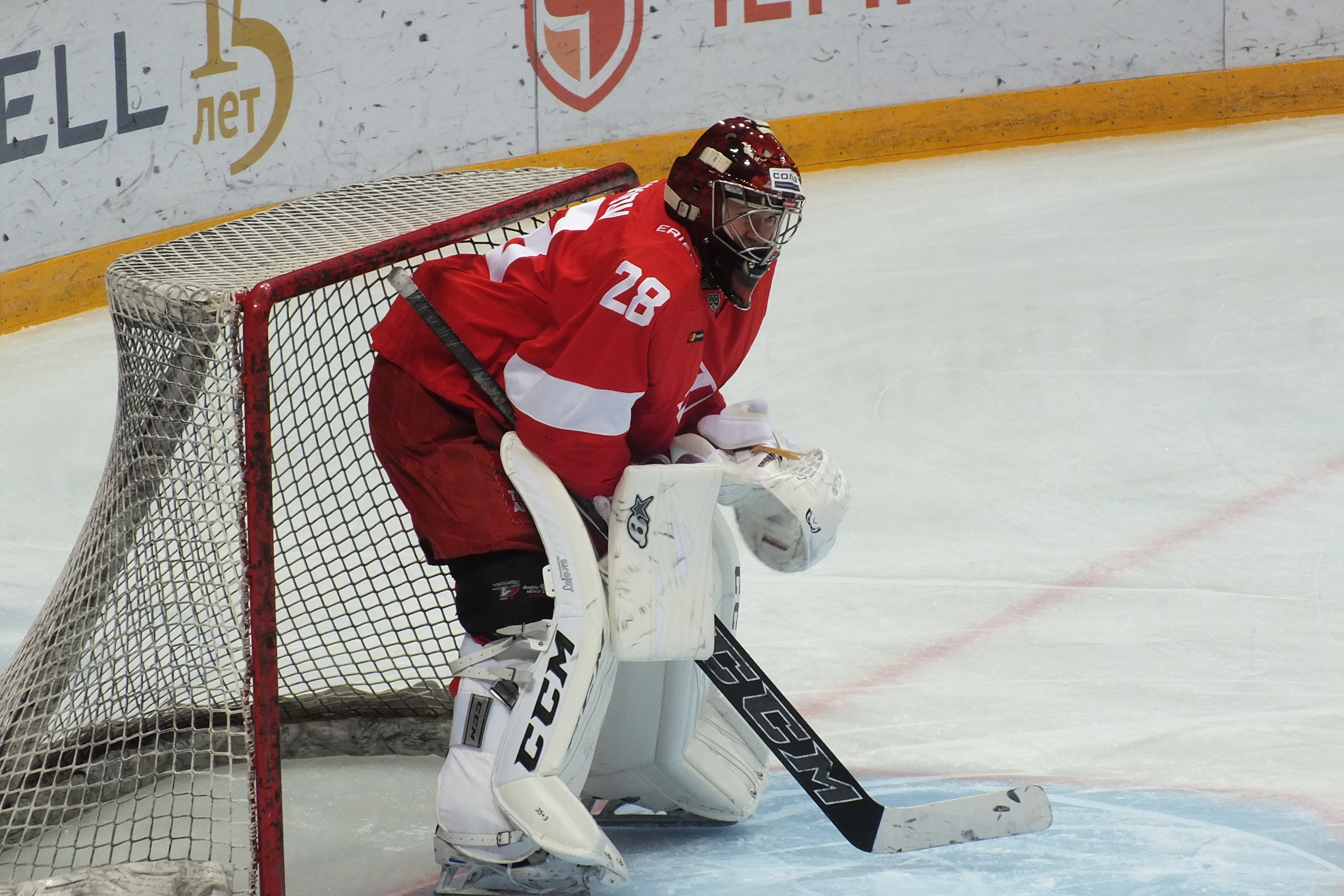
- Born: July 31, 1996 (age 30) Moscow, Russia
- Height: 5 ft 11 in (180 cm)
- Weight: 179 lb (81 kg; 12 st 11 lb)
- Position: Goaltender
- Catches: Left
- KHL team Former teams: Amur Khabarovsk; Spartak Moscow; Admiral Vladivostok; Lada Togliatti
- Playing career: 2013–present

Alexander Alexandrovich Trushkov (Трушков Александр Александрович; born July 31, 1996) is a Russian professional ice hockey goaltender. He is currently playing with Amur Khabarovsk of the Kontinental Hockey League (KHL).

Trushkov made his KHL debut playing with HC Spartak Moscow during the 2013–14 KHL season.

After five seasons as the starting goaltender for HC Lada Togliatti, Trushkov was signed to a one-year contract with Amur Khabarovsk on 3 June 2026.
