= Gauthier Descloux =

Swiss ice hockey player

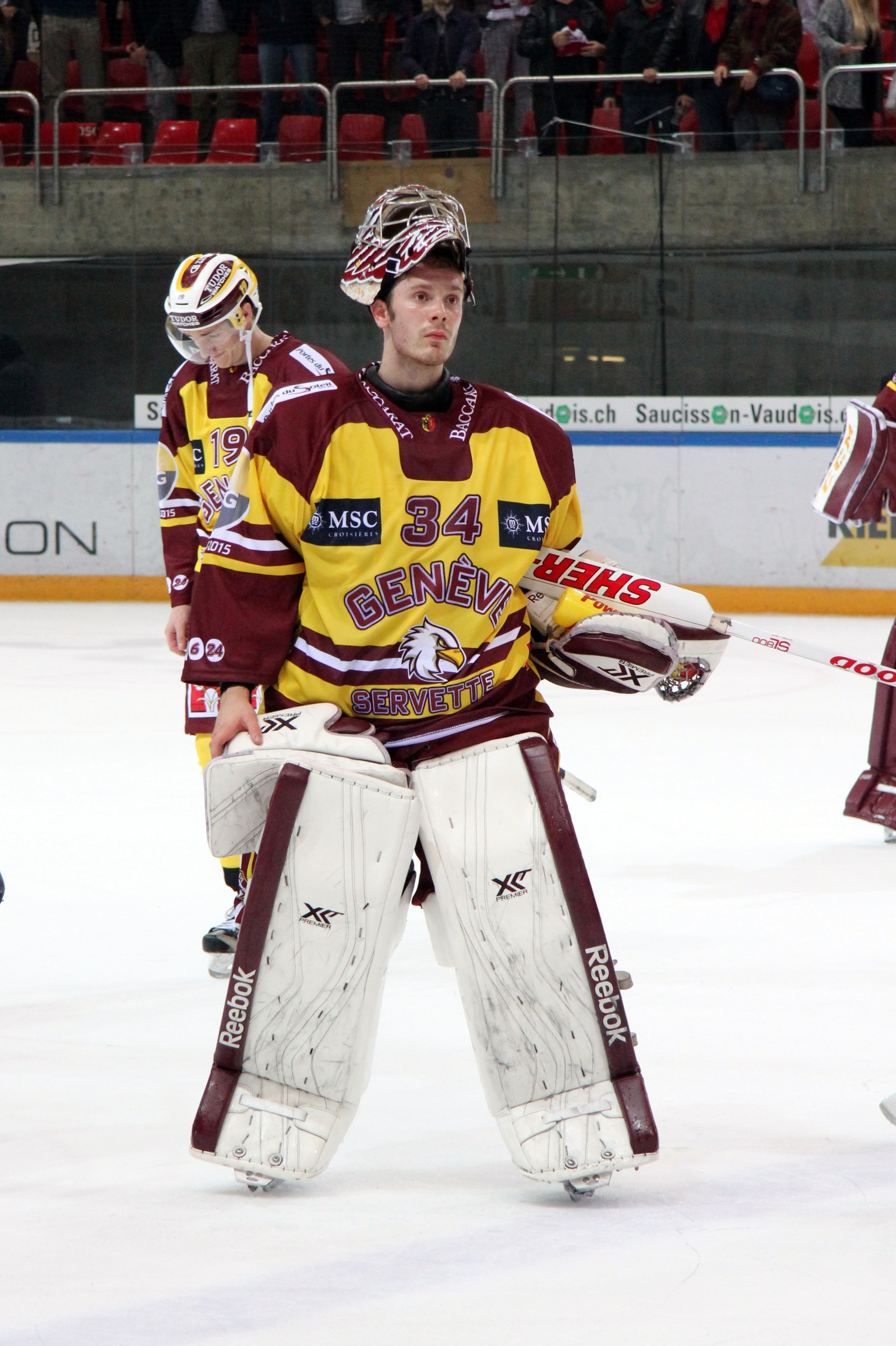
- Descloux with the Genève-Servette HC in 2014
- Born: July 23, 1996 (age 29) Fribourg, Switzerland
- Height: 5 ft 11 in (180 cm)
- Weight: 165 lb (75 kg; 11 st 11 lb)
- Position: Goaltender
- Caught: Left
- Played for: Genève-Servette HC; HC Ambrì-Piotta; HC Ajoie
- Playing career: 2014–2025

Gauthier Descloux is a Swiss former professional ice hockey goaltender who spent most of his career with Genève-Servette HC of the National League (NL). He won the 2023 NL title and the 2024 CHL title with Servette.

Descloux also briefly played with HC Ajoie of the Swiss League (SL) and with HC Ambrì-Piotta of the National League (NL).

== Playing career ==
Descloux made his professional debut with Genève-Servette HC during the 2014–15 season. The next year he was loaned to HC Ajoie for most of the season, including the 2016 SL playoffs. Descloux posted a .936 save % during the playoffs with a 1.77 GAA to lead Ajoie to the Swiss League title. Descloux was loaned to HC Ambrì-Piotta to start the 2016/17 season. He played 16 games for the team, as well as 4 SL games with their affiliate, the Ticino Rockets. He again started the 2017/18 season on loan with Ambri-Piotta but was called back by Geneva at the start of the season to replace injured Robert Mayer.

On October 18, 2018, Descloux was signed to an early 3-year contract extension by Genève-Servette.

On February 3, 2021, Descloux agreed to an early four-year contract extension with Servette through the end of the 2025–26 season. In June 2025, Descloux decided to forgo the last year of his contract with Geneva for personal reasons.

In January 2026, Descloux officially announced his retirement from professional hockey.

== International play ==
Descloux made his debut with the Switzerland men's national team in November 2018 at the Deutschland Cup.
