= Nikita Lyamkin =

Russian ice hockey player

- Born: February 6, 1996 (age 29); Barnaul, Altai Krai, Russia
- Height: 6 ft 5 in (196 cm)
- Weight: 214 lb (97 kg; 15 st 4 lb)
- Position: Defence
- Shoots: Left
- KHL team Former teams: Ak Bars Kazan; Metallurg Novokuznetsk
- NHL draft: Undrafted
- Playing career: 2012–present

Nikita Lyamkin (born February 6, 1996) is a Russian professional ice hockey defenceman currently playing with Ak Bars Kazan in the Kontinental Hockey League (KHL). He is a one-time Russian Champion.

== Awards and honours ==
Award	Year
KHL
Gagarin Cup (Ak Bars Kazan)	2018
