= Roger Karrer =

Swiss ice hockey player

- Born: January 21, 1997 (age 28) Zürich, Switzerland
- Height: 5 ft 11 in (180 cm)
- Weight: 181 lb (82 kg; 12 st 13 lb)
- Position: Defence
- Shoots: Right
- NL team Former teams: Genève-Servette HC; ZSC Lions
- Playing career: 2014–present

Roger Karrer (born January 21, 1997) is a Swiss professional ice hockey defenceman who currently serves as captain of Genève-Servette HC of the National League (NL). He previously played for the GCK Lions and the ZSC Lions.

== Playing career ==
Karrer made his professional debut with the GCK Lions of the Swiss League (SL) in the 2014–15 season, appearing in 43 SL games this season. He also made his National League (NL) debut that same year with the ZSC Lions, playing 5 games and scoring no point. Karrer also played the 2015 playoffs with Zürich's junior team in the Elite Junior A, scoring 3 points in 12 games and helped the team win the championship.

Karrer eventually played 121 NL games (13 points) with Zürich and 91 SL games (23 points) with their affiliate before signing a three-year contract with an option for a fourth season with Genève-Servette HC on November 21, 2018. The contract runs from the 2019/20 season through the 2021/22 season. On May 13, 2021, Karrer renegotiated his contract to sign a new 4-year deal with Servette through the 2024–25 season.

On July 24, 2024, Karrer agreed to an early 3-year contract extension with Servette, keeping him at the club through the 2027/28 season.

On September 3, 2024, it was announced that Karrer would take over the team's captaincy during the 2024/25 season as Noah Rod is set to miss the entirety of the season.

== International play ==
Karrer made his debut with Switzerland men's team in 2018.
