= Sebastian Moberg =

Finnish ice hockey player

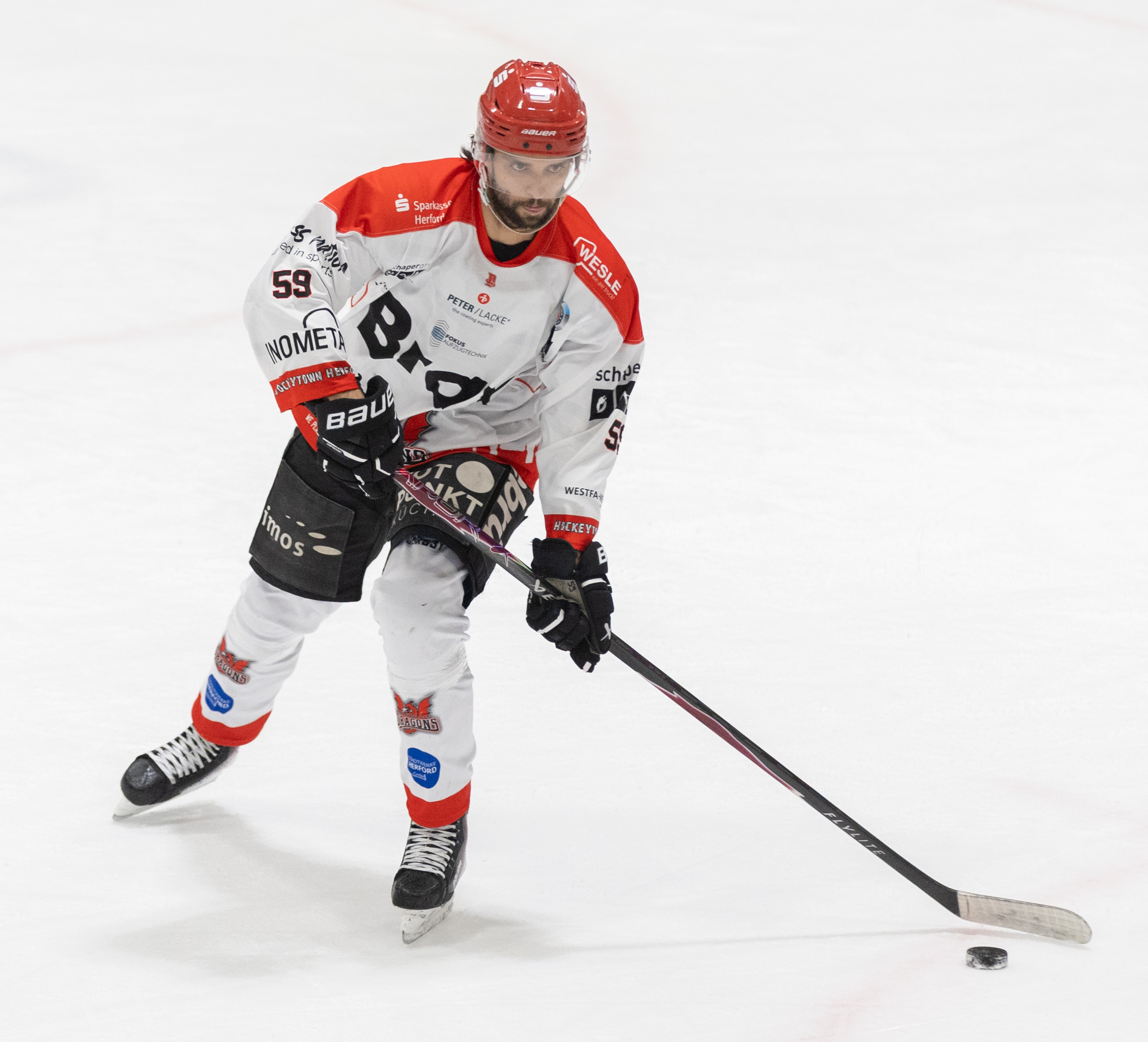
- Moberg in 2026
- Born: February 24, 1996 (age 30) Espoo, Finland
- Height: 5 ft 11 in (180 cm)
- Weight: 168 lb (76 kg; 12 st 0 lb)
- Position: Defence
- Shoots: Left
- Liiga team: HIFK
- NHL draft: Undrafted
- Playing career: 2013–present

Sebastian Moberg (born February 24, 1996) is a Finnish ice hockey defenceman. He is currently playing with IceFighters Leipzig in Germany

Moberg made his Liiga debut playing with HIFK during the 2014–15 Liiga season.
