= Jere Rouhiainen =

Finnish ice hockey player

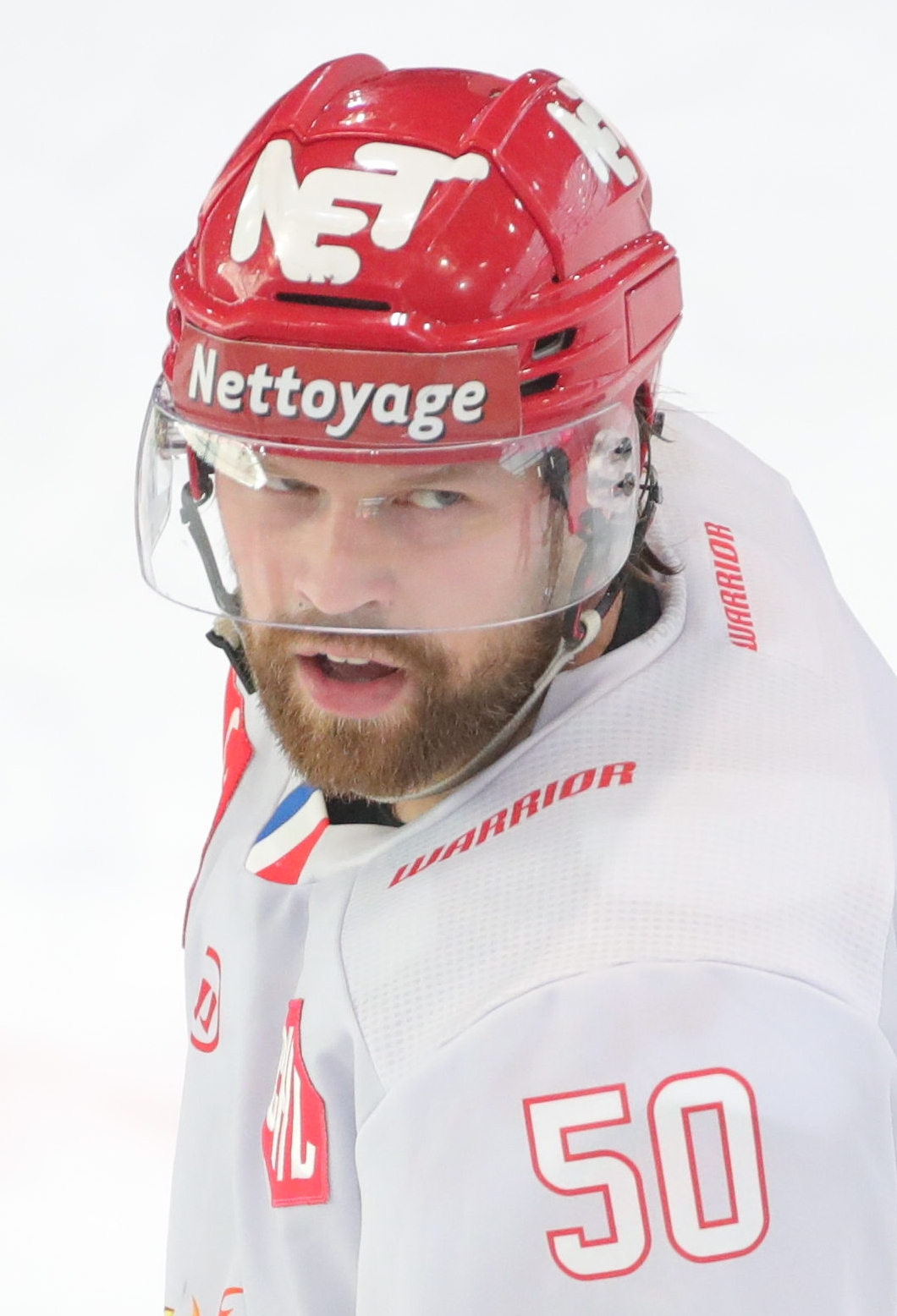
- Born: January 26, 1996 (age 30) Tampere, Finland
- Height: 6 ft 0 in (183 cm)
- Weight: 170 lb (77 kg; 12 st 2 lb)
- Position: Defense
- Shoots: Left
- Synerglace Ligue Magnus team Former teams: Brûleurs de Loups; Tappara; LeKi
- NHL draft: Undrafted
- Playing career: 2014–present

Jere Rouhiainen (born January 26, 1996) is a Finnish professional ice hockey player. He is currently playing for Brûleurs de Loups of the French Synerglace Ligue Magnus.

Rouhiainen made his Liiga debut playing with LeKi during the 2015-16 Liiga season.
