= Joona Voutilainen =

Finnish ice hockey player

- Born: November 17, 1996 (age 28); Espoo, Finland
- Height: 6 ft 1 in (185 cm)
- Weight: 159 lb (72 kg; 11 st 5 lb)
- Position: Goaltender
- Catches: Left
- NOR team Former teams: Vålerenga; Lahti Pelicans; JYP Jyväskylä; HPK; KooKoo; IF Björklöven
- Playing career: 2016–present

Joona Voutilainen (born November 17, 1996) is a Finnish professional ice hockey goaltender who currently plays for Vålerenga Ishockey in the EliteHockey Ligaen (NOR).
