= Miro Keskitalo =

Finnish ice hockey player

- Born: 16 February 1996 (age 30) Vantaa, Finland
- Height: 6 ft 2 in (188 cm)
- Weight: 198 lb (90 kg; 14 st 2 lb)
- Position: Defence
- Shoots: Left
- Liiga team: Kiekko-Espoo
- NHL draft: Undrafted
- Playing career: 2014–present

Miro Keskitalo (born 16 February 1996) is a Finnish ice hockey defenceman. He is currently playing with Kiekko-Espoo in the Finland's Liiga. Keskitalo made his Liiga debut playing with HC TPS during the 2014–15 Liiga season.
