= Alex Rašner =

Czech ice hockey player

- Born: February 12, 1996 (age 29); Jeseník, Czech Republic
- Height: 5 ft 11 in (180 cm)
- Weight: 176 lb (80 kg; 12 st 8 lb)
- Position: Defenseman
- Shoots: Left
- Czech team: HC Olomouc
- Playing career: 2012–present

Alex Rašner (born February 12, 1996) is a Czech professional ice hockey player. He is currently playing for HC Olomouc of the Czech Extraliga.

Rašner made his Czech Extraliga debut playing with HC Olomouc during the 2014-15 Czech Extraliga season.
