= 2016 World Junior Ice Hockey Championships =

2016 international ice hockey competition

2016 IIHF World Junior Championship

Tournament details
- Host country: Finland
- City: Helsinki
- Venue(s): Hartwall Arena and Helsinki Ice Hall (in 1 host city)
- Dates: December 26, 2015 – January 5, 2016
- Teams: 10

Final positions
- Champions: Finland (4th title)
- Runners-up: Russia
- Third place: United States
- Fourth place: Sweden

Tournament statistics
- Games played: 30
- Goals scored: 193 (6.43 per game)
- Attendance: 215,226 (7,174 per game)
- Scoring leader: (Finland) Jesse Puljujärvi (17 points)

Awards
- MVP: (Finland) Jesse Puljujärvi

Official website
- worldjunior2016.com

The 2016 World Junior Ice Hockey Championship was the 40th Ice Hockey World Junior Championship. It was hosted in Helsinki, Finland. It began on December 26, 2015, and ended with the gold medal game on January 5, 2016. This marked the sixth time that Finland has hosted the WJC, and the hosts defeated Russia 4–3 in overtime to win their fourth title in history and second in the last three years. Belarus was relegated to Division I-A for 2017 by merit of their tenth-place finish, while Finnish right winger Jesse Puljujärvi earned MVP and top scorer honors.

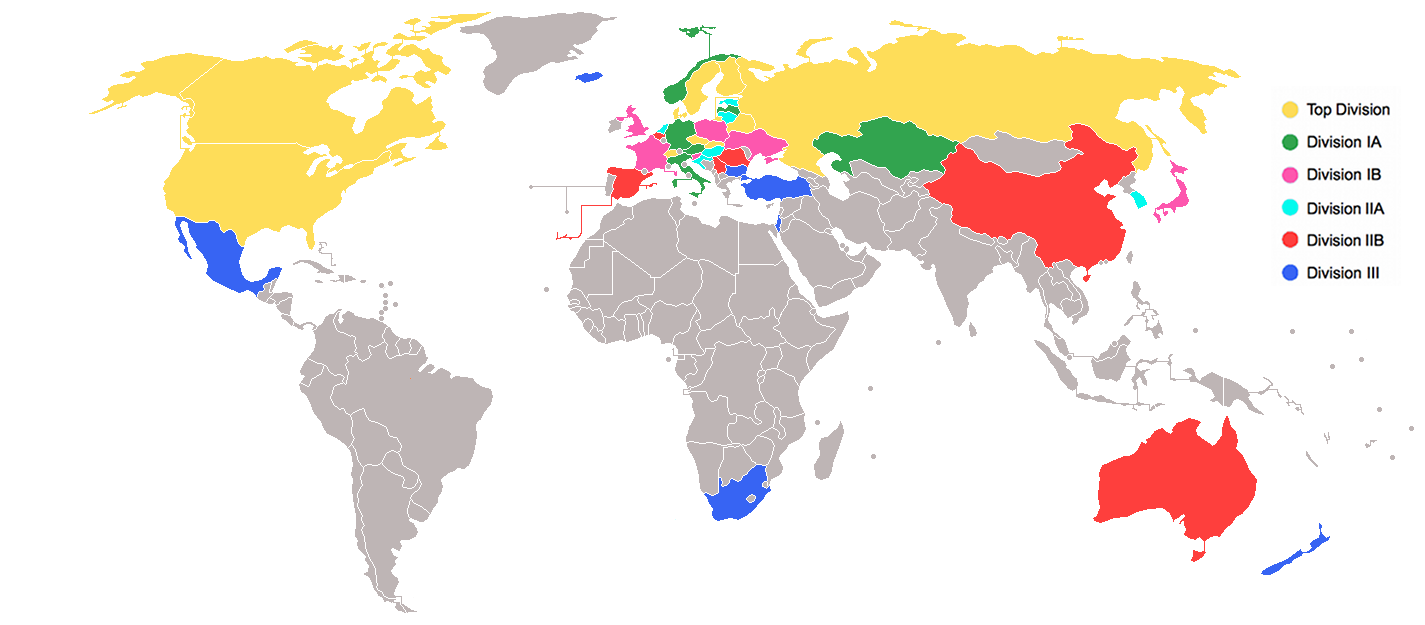
Nations participating at 2016 IIHF World Junior Championships

== Player eligibility ==
A player is eligible to play in the 2016 World Junior Ice Hockey Championships if:

- the player is of male gender;
- the player was born at the earliest in 1996, and at the latest, in 2001;
- the player is a citizen in the country he represents;
- the player is under the jurisdiction of a national association that is a member of the International Ice Hockey Federation (IIHF).

If a player who has never played in IIHF-organized competition wishes to switch national eligibility, he must have played in competitions for two consecutive years in the new country without playing in another country, as well as show his move to the new country's national association with an international transfer card. In case the player has previously played in IIHF-organized competition but wishes to switch national eligibility, he must have played in competitions for four consecutive years in the new country without playing in another country, he must show his move to the new country's national association with an international transfer card, as well as be a citizen of the new country. A player may only switch national eligibility once.

== Top Division ==
=== Venues ===
Helsinki	Helsinki is located in Finland	Helsinki
Hartwall Arena Capacity: 13,349	Helsinki is located in Finland	Helsinki Ice Hall Capacity: 8,200

=== Match officials ===
The IIHF selected 12 referees and 10 linesmen to officiate during the tournament:

Referees

- (Russia) Alexei Anisimov
- (Latvia) Andris Ansons
- (Finland) Stefan Fonselius
- (Canada) Brett Iverson
- (Slovakia) Daniel Konc
- (Sweden) Mikael Nord
- (Czech Republic) Vladimir Pešina
- (Germany) Daniel Piechaczek
- (United States) Christopher Pitoscia
- (Finland) Aleksi Rantala
- (Canada) Jean-Philippe Sylvain
- (Switzerland) Marc Wiegand

Linesmen

- (Canada) Nicolas Chartrand-Piché
- (Slovenia) Matjaž Hribar
- (Denmark) Rene Jensen
- (Switzerland) Roman Kaderli
- (Finland) Pasi Nieminen
- (United States) Brian Oliver
- (Russia) Alexander Otmakhov
- (Sweden) Henrik Pihlblad
- (Finland) Hannu Sormunen
- (Norway) Alexander Waldejer

=== Format ===
The four best ranked teams from each group of the preliminary round advance to the quarterfinals, while the last-placed team from both groups play a relegation round in a best-of-three format to determine the relegated team.

=== Preliminary round ===
All times are local. (Eastern European Time – UTC+2)

==== Group A ====
Pos	Team	Pld	W	OTW	OTL	L	GF	GA	GD	Pts	Qualification
1	Sweden	4	4	0	0	0	19	5	+14	12	Quarterfinals
2	United States	4	3	0	0	1	18	5	+13	9	Quarterfinals
3	Canada	4	1	1	0	2	13	12	+1	5	Quarterfinals
4	Denmark	4	1	0	0	3	4	16	−12	3	Quarterfinals
5	Switzerland	4	0	0	1	3	7	23	−16	1	Relegation round

Source: IIHF

December 26, 2015; 16:00	Switzerland	3–8 (1–3, 1–3, 1–2)	Sweden	Helsinki Ice Hall; Attendance: 5,600

Game reference

Gauthier Descloux
Joren van Pottelberghe
Goalies
Linus Söderström
Referees:
(Latvia) Andris Ansons
(Czech Republic) Vladimír Pešina
Linesmen:
(Finland) Pasi Nieminen
(United States) Brian Oliver

	0–1	01:21 – W. Nylander (A. Nylander, Timashov)
	0–2	10:17 – Lindblom (Holmström, Kempe)
Kessler (Malgin, Glauser) – 17:23	1–2
	1–3	19:31 – Timashov (A. Nylander) (PP)
	1–4	21:48 – Timashov (Pettersson, A. Nylander) (PP)
	1–5	24:17 – Asplund (Carlsson, Pettersson)
Rod (Harlacher, Malgin) – 27:11	2–5
	2–6	32:50 – Forsbacka-Karlsson (Lagesson)
	2–7	42:34 – Larsson (A. Nylander, A. Holmström)
Kessler (SH) – 51:57	3–7
	3–8	56:40 – Ollas Matsson (Pettersson)

60 min
Penalties
10 min
18
Shots
39

December 26, 2015; 20:00	United States	4–2 (0–0, 1–1, 3–1)	Canada	Helsinki Ice Hall; Attendance: 6,112

Game reference

Alex Nedeljkovic
Goalies
Mason McDonald
Referees:
(Sweden) Mikael Nord
(Finland) Aleksi Rantala
Linesmen:
(Russia) Alexander Otmakhov
(Finland) Hannu Sormunen

	0–1	25:06 – Barzal (Chartier, Gauthier)
White (Milano, Dvorak) – 36:33	1–1
Werenski (Matthews, Tkachuk) (PP) – 47:22	2–1
	2–2	50:45 – Strome (Marner, Dermott) (PP)
Belpedio (Borgen, White) – 56:42	3–2
Matthews (Werenski, Tkachuk) – 57:23	4–2

27 min
Penalties
4 min
25
Shots
27

December 27, 2015; 20:00	Denmark	2–1 (0–1, 0–0, 2–0)	Switzerland	Helsinki Ice Hall; Attendance: 1,596

Game reference

Thomas Lillie
Goalies
Joren van Pottelberghe
Referees:
(Russia) Alexei Anisimov
(United States) Christopher Pitoscia
Linesmen:
(Slovenia) Matjaž Hribar
(Norway) Alexander Waldejer

	0–1	08:21 – Rod (Harlacher, Karrer)
Nielsen (K. Jensen, Røndbjerg) – 41:17	1–1
From (True, Krag) – 46:20	2–1

25 min
Penalties
4 min
22
Shots
23

December 28, 2015; 16:00	Sweden	1–0 (0–0, 1–0, 0–0)	United States	Helsinki Ice Hall; Attendance: 5,415

Game reference
Linus Söderström	Goalies	Alex Nedeljkovic	Referees: (Germany) Daniel Piechaczek (Canada) Jean-Phillippe Sylvain; Linesmen: (Canada) Nicolas Chartrand-Piché (Finland) Hannu Sormunen
A. Nylander (Timashov, Carlsson) – 22:41 / 1–0			Referees: (Germany) Daniel Piechaczek (Canada) Jean-Phillippe Sylvain; Linesmen: (Canada) Nicolas Chartrand-Piché (Finland) Hannu Sormunen
16 min	Penalties	12 min	Referees: (Germany) Daniel Piechaczek (Canada) Jean-Phillippe Sylvain; Linesmen: (Canada) Nicolas Chartrand-Piché (Finland) Hannu Sormunen
23	Shots	46	Referees: (Germany) Daniel Piechaczek (Canada) Jean-Phillippe Sylvain; Linesmen: (Canada) Nicolas Chartrand-Piché (Finland) Hannu Sormunen

December 28, 2015; 20:00	Canada	6–1 (1–1, 4–0, 1–0)	Denmark	Helsinki Ice Hall; Attendance: 5,891

Game reference

Mason McDonald
Goalies
Mathias Seldrup
Referees:
(Slovakia) Daniel Konc
(Switzerland) Marc Wiegand
Linesmen:
(Switzerland) Roman Kaderli
(Finland) Pasi Nieminen

	0–1	12:49 – True (From, Krogsgaard)
Beauvillier (Barzal, Chartier) – 13:52	1–1
Quenneville (Marner, Fleury) – 21:14	2–1
Barzal (Chabot, Hicketts) (PP) – 25:03	3–1
Crouse (Konecny, Dermott) – 25:54	4–1
Marner (Strome, Point) – 31:30	5–1
Strome (Point) (PP) – 49:32	6–1

6 min
Penalties
10 min
58
Shots
11

December 29, 2015; 20:00	Switzerland	2–3 GWS (2–1, 0–1, 0–0) (OT 0–0) (SO: 0–1)	Canada	Helsinki Ice Hall; Attendance: 3,522

Game reference

Joren van Pottelberghe
Goalies
Mackenzie Blackwood
Referees:
(Finland) Stefan Fonselius
(Sweden) Mikael Nord
Linesmen:
(Sweden) Henrik Pihlblad
(Finland) Hannu Sormunen

Riat (Rod, Malgin) (PP) – 02:12	1–0
Meyer (Forrer, Privet) – 15:37	2–0
	2–1	19:37 – Strome (Chabot, Crouse)
	2–2	32:17 – Hicketts (Crouse)

Suter (miss)
Meier (miss)
Shootout
(miss) Strome
Point
Barzal
8 min
Penalties
4 min
25
Shots
35

December 30, 2015; 16:00	Sweden	5–0 (2–0, 1–0, 2–0)	Denmark	Helsinki Ice Hall; Attendance: 4,193

Game reference

Felix Sandström
Goalies
Thomas Lillie
Referees:
(Finland) Aleksi Rantala
(Switzerland) Marc Wiegand
Linesmen:
(Russia) Alexander Otmakhov
(Norway) Alexander Waldejer

Kempe (Lindblom) – 00:13	1–0
Forsling (Forsbacka-Karlsson) (PP) – 10:22	2–0
Lindblom (Holmström, Ollas Mattsson) – 37:17	3–0
Lagesson (Lööke, Ehn) – 50:02	4–0
A. Nylander (Asplund, Larsson) – 55:55	5–0

4 min
Penalties
10 min
48
Shots
9

December 30, 2015; 20:00	United States	10–1 (6–0, 4–1, 0–0)	Switzerland	Helsinki Ice Hall; Attendance: 3,701

Game reference

Alex Nedeljkovic
Brandon Halverson
Goalies
Joren van Pottelberghe
Ludovic Waeber
Referees:
(Slovakia) Daniel Konc
(Germany) Daniel Piechaczek
Linesmen:
(Denmark) Rene Jensen
(Finland) Pasi Nieminen

Dvorak (Werenski, Milano) – 7:23	1–0
Matthews (Tkachuk, White) – 8:26	2–0
Carlo (Werenski) – 10:13	3–0
Werenski (Dvorak, Milano) – 12:59	4–0
Tkachuk (Matthews) – 15:10	5–0
Schmaltz (Hitchcock, Boeser) – 16:33	6–0
	6–1	21:26 – Meier (Hischier)
Tkachuk (Matthews) – 22:12	7–1
Matthews (Schmaltz, White) (PP) – 28:09	8–1
White (Dvorak) (SH) – 29:00	9–1
Donato – 30:58	10–1

6 min
Penalties
14 min
33
Shots
28

December 31, 2015; 16:00	Denmark	1–4 (1–1, 0–1, 0–2)	United States	Helsinki Ice Hall; Attendance: 5,128

Game reference

Mathias Seldrup
Goalies
Brandon Halverson
Referees:
(Finland) Stefan Fonselius
(Canada) Brett Iverson
Linesmen:
(Canada) Nicolas Chartrand-Piché
(Sweden) Henrik Pihlblad

Lassen – 10:14	1–0
	1–1	17:04 – Matthews (White, Tkachuk)
	1–2	24:02 – Milano (Belpedio)
	1–3	45:40 – White (Tkachuk, Matthews)
	1–4	47:43 – Bjork (Milano, Fortunato) (PP)

6 min
Penalties
2 min
17
Shots
44

December 31, 2015; 20:00	Canada	2–5 (1–2, 0–1, 1–2)	Sweden	Helsinki Ice Hall; Attendance: 7,003

Game reference

Mackenzie Blackwood
Goalies
Linus Söderström
Felix Sandström
Referees:
(Russia) Alexei Anisimov
(Czech Republic) Vladimír Pešina
Linesmen:
(Finland) Pasi Nieminen
(United States) Brian Oliver

	0–1	4:37 – A. Nylander (Asplund, Timashov) (PP)
	0–2	7:08 – Forsling (Nylander, Kempe) (PP)
Stephens (Chabot) – 15:51	1–2
	1–3	33:38 – Kempe (Holmström, Forsling) (PP)
	1–4	47:09 – Karlsson (Carlsson, Lööke)
Marner (Hicketts, Strome) (PP2) – 54:10	2–4
	2–5	59:49 – Asplund (Englund) (ENG)

20 min
Penalties
14 min
24
Shots
32

==== Group B ====
Pos	Team	Pld	W	OTW	OTL	L	GF	GA	GD	Pts	Qualification
1	Russia	4	3	1	0	0	14	7	+7	11	Quarterfinals
2	Finland (H)	4	3	0	0	1	23	13	+10	9	Quarterfinals
3	Czech Republic	4	2	0	1	1	12	10	+2	7	Quarterfinals
4	Slovakia	4	1	0	0	3	8	14	−6	3	Quarterfinals
5	Belarus	4	0	0	0	4	6	19	−13	0	Relegation round

Source: IIHF
(H) Host

December 26, 2015; 14:00	Czech Republic	1–2 GWS (0–0, 1–0, 0–1) (OT 0–0) (SO: 0–1)	Russia	Hartwall Arena; Attendance: 10,106

Game reference
Vítek Vaněček	Goalies	Alexandar Georgiev	Referees: (Finland) Stefan Fonselius (Germany) Daniel Piechaczek; Linesmen: (Canada) Nicolas Chartrand-Piché (Sweden) Henrik Pihlblad
Špaček (PS) – 33:54 / 1–0; / 1–1 / 49:09 – Lauta (Fazleyev, Dergachyov)			Referees: (Finland) Stefan Fonselius (Germany) Daniel Piechaczek; Linesmen: (Canada) Nicolas Chartrand-Piché (Sweden) Henrik Pihlblad
Lakatoš (miss); Chlapík (miss); Kaše (miss)	Shootout	Lazarev; (miss) Polunin; (miss) Lauta	Referees: (Finland) Stefan Fonselius (Germany) Daniel Piechaczek; Linesmen: (Canada) Nicolas Chartrand-Piché (Sweden) Henrik Pihlblad
27 min	Penalties	6 min	Referees: (Finland) Stefan Fonselius (Germany) Daniel Piechaczek; Linesmen: (Canada) Nicolas Chartrand-Piché (Sweden) Henrik Pihlblad
25	Shots	22	Referees: (Finland) Stefan Fonselius (Germany) Daniel Piechaczek; Linesmen: (Canada) Nicolas Chartrand-Piché (Sweden) Henrik Pihlblad

December 26, 2015; 18:00	Finland	6–0 (0–0, 1–0, 5–0)	Belarus	Hartwall Arena; Attendance: 12,222

Game reference

Veini Vehviläinen
Goalies
Ivan Kulbakov
Referees:
(Slovakia) Daniel Konc
(France) Jean-Philippe Sylvain
Linesmen:
(Slovenia) Matjaž Hribar
(Denmark) Rene Jensen

Puljujärvi (Aho) – 37:14	1–0
Laine (Puljujärvi, Juolevi) – 41:33	2–0
Niku (Siikonen, Björkqvist) – 45:46	3–0
Puljujärvi (Juolevi, Aho) (PP) – 47:26	4–0
Repo (Saarela) – 53:04	5–0
Rantanen (Aho, Mikkola) (SH, ENG) – 59:40	6–0

8 min
Penalties
18 min
37
Shots
10

December 27, 2015; 16:00	Belarus	2–4 (1–1, 1–1, 0–2)	Slovakia	Hartwall Arena; Attendance: 1,472

Game reference

Ivan Kulbakov
Vladislav Verbitski
Goalies
Adam Húska
Referees:
(Finland) Stefan Fonselius
(Switzerland) Marc Wiegand
Linesmen:
(Denmark) Rene Jensen
(Switzerland) Roman Kaderli

	0–1	06:56 – Koch (Sukeľ, Šiška) (EA)
Malinovski (Chernikov, Sushko) – 11:33	1–1
Vasilchuk (Belevich, Karaban) (PP) – 22:21	2–1
	2–2	32:28 – Lešťan (Surový)
	2–3	40:19 – Hrušík (Paločko)
	2–4	59:41 – Šiška (AG, EN)

10 min
Penalties
4 min
26
Shots
39

December 28, 2015; 14:00	Slovakia	0–2 (0–0, 0–1, 0–1)	Czech Republic	Hartwall Arena; Attendance: 8,998

Game reference
Adam Húska	Goalies	Vítek Vaněček	Referees: (Latvia) Andris Ansons (Finland) Aleksi Rantala; Linesmen: (Russia) Alexander Otmakhov (Norway) Alexander Waldejer
0–1 / 36:58 – Pastrňák (Zbořil, Kaše) (PP); 0–2 / 51:55 – Lakatoš (Hronek)			Referees: (Latvia) Andris Ansons (Finland) Aleksi Rantala; Linesmen: (Russia) Alexander Otmakhov (Norway) Alexander Waldejer
6 min	Penalties	4 min	Referees: (Latvia) Andris Ansons (Finland) Aleksi Rantala; Linesmen: (Russia) Alexander Otmakhov (Norway) Alexander Waldejer
18	Shots	34	Referees: (Latvia) Andris Ansons (Finland) Aleksi Rantala; Linesmen: (Russia) Alexander Otmakhov (Norway) Alexander Waldejer

December 28, 2015; 18:00	Russia	6–4 (1–2, 4–1, 1–1)	Finland	Hartwall Arena; Attendance: 12,526

Game reference

Alexandar Georgiev
Goalies
Veini Vehviläinen
Referees:
(Canada) Brett Iverson
(United States) Christopher Pitoscia
Linesmen:
(United States) Brian Oliver
(Sweden) Henrik Pihlblad

	0–1	04:13 – Aho (Puljujärvi, Laine)
Kaprizov (Provorov, Lazarev) (PP) – 06:10	1–1
	1–2	18:53 – Laine (Puljujärvi, Keskitalo)
	1–3	20:53 – Saarela (Puljujärvi, Laine) (PP)
Svetlakov (Korshkov, Voronkov) (SH) – 28:48	2–3
Kraskovsky (Korshkov, Zhuldikov) (PP) – 32:29	3–3
Kamenev (Kaprizov, Lazarev) (PP) – 35:28	4–3
Polunin (Korshkov) – 36:05	5–3
	5–4	41:18 – Saarela (Nättinen)
Fazleyev (Provorov, Lauta) – 53:48	6–4

12 min
Penalties
12 min
25
Shots
32

December 29, 2015; 16:00	Belarus	1–4 (0–3, 0–0, 1–1)	Russia	Hartwall Arena; Attendance: 2,342

Game reference

Vladislav Verbitski
Goalies
Ilya Samsonov
Referees:
(Latvia) Andris Ansons
(Czech Republic) Vladimír Pešina
Linesmen:
(Slovenia) Matjaž Hribar
(Denmark) Rene Jensen

	0–1	10:00 – Lazarev (Kamenev, Kaprizov) (PP)
	0–2	15:42 – Polunin (Kraskovsky, Korshkov) (PP)
	0–3	18:19 – Kamenev (Provorov, Lazarev)
Alexei Patsenkin (Busko) – 46:14	1–3
	1–4	47:41 – Polunin (Korshkov, Zhuldikov)

6 min
Penalties
6 min
18
Shots
32

December 30, 2015; 14:00	Czech Republic	5–3 (1–0, 1–3, 3–0)	Belarus	Hartwall Arena; Attendance: 8,456

Game reference

Vítek Vaněček
Goalies
Ivan Kulbakov
Referees:
(Canada) Brett Iverson
(Canada) Jean-Philippe Sylvain
Linesmen:
(Canada) Nicolas Chartrand-Piché
(Switzerland) Roman Kaderli

Stránský – 15:39	1–0
	1–1	20:43 – Falkovski (Chernikov, Karaban)
	1–2	30:26 – Sharangovich (Karaban, Falkovski) (PP)
Lakatoš (Pastrňák, Hronek) – 32:26	2–2
	2–3	37:31 – Vladislav Goncharov (Karaban) (PP)
Smejkal (Špaček, Ordoš) – 52:06	3–3
Veselý (Špaček) – 54:20	4–3
Mašín (Smejkal) (ENG) – 59:40	5–3

4 min
Penalties
2 min
49
Shots
24

December 30, 2015; 18:00	Slovakia	3–8 (2–1, 0–2, 1–5)	Finland	Hartwall Arena; Attendance: 12,723

Game reference

Adam Húska
Stanislav Skorvanek
Goalies
Kaapo Kähkönen
Referees:
(Russia) Alexei Anisimov
(United States) Cristopher Pitoscia
Linesmen:
(Slovenia) Matjaž Hribar
(United States) Brian Oliver

Sukeľ (Paločko, Sloboda) (PP) – 9:50	1–0
Bondra (Romančík, Surový) – 11:55	2–0
	2–1	15:15 – Aho (Laine, Puljujärvi) (PP)
	2–2	34:07 – Saarela (Juolevi, Puljujärvi) (PP)
	2–3	38:22 – Hintz (Saarijärvi, Rantanen)
	2–4	40:28 – Puljujärvi (Laine, Aho)
	2–5	42:41 – Aho (Puljujärvi, Juolevi) (PP)
Maier (Sukeľ, Jaroš) (PP,EA) – 45:27	3–5
	3–6	51:52 – Laine
	3–7	52:30 – Kapanen (Saarijärvi, Hintz) (PP)
	3–8	57:42 – Björkqvist (Saarijärvi, Siikonen)

16 min
Penalties
8 min
28
Shots
48

December 31, 2015; 14:00	Russia	2–1 (1–0, 1–1, 0–0)	Slovakia	Hartwall Arena; Attendance: 6,497

Game reference

Alexandar Georgiev
Goalies
Adam Húska
Referees:
(Sweden) Mikael Nord
(Canada) Jean-Philippe Sylvain
Linesmen:
(Switzerland) Roman Kaderli
(Finland) Hannu Sormunen

Lauta (Mikulovich, Provorov) – 15:29	1–0
Rykov – 29:12	2–0
	2–1	35:50 – Jaroš (Sukeľ)

14 min
Penalties
8 min
27
Shots
21

December 31, 2015; 18:00	Finland	5–4 (0–0, 3–3, 2–1)	Czech Republic	Hartwall Arena; Attendance: 12,198

Game reference

Veini Vehviläinen
Goalies
Vítek Vaněček
Referees:
(Latvia) Andris Ansons
(Switzerland) Marc Wiegand
Linesmen:
(Russia) Alexander Otmakhov
(Norway) Alexander Waldejer

Puljujärvi (Aho) – 20:57	1–0
	1–1	24:22 – Smejkal (Špaček, Pastrňák)
	1–2	26:08 – Ordoš (Voženílek, Šoustal)
Hintz – 28:06	2–2
Kalapudas (Kapanen, Niku) (PP) – 30:46	3–2
	3–3	39:27 – Sklenička (Mašín, Zacha)
	3–4	48:37 – Špaček (Pastrňák, Smejkal)
Puljujärvi (Nättinen, Juolevi) (PP) – 50:10	4–4
Laine (Juolevi, Aho) – 54:13	5–4

8 min
Penalties
10 min
27
Shots
35

=== Relegation round ===
January 2, 2016; 12:00	Switzerland	5–1 (1–1, 2–0, 2–0)	Belarus	Helsinki Ice Hall; Attendance: 453

Game reference

Joren van Pottelberghe
Goalies
Ivan Kulbakov
Referees:
(Slovakia) Daniel Konc
(Czech Republic) Vladimír Pešina
Linesmen:
(Denmark) Rene Jensen
(Finland) Hannu Sormunen

	0–1	01:59 – Buinitsky (Veremyov) (PP)
Rod (Kessler) – 06:36	1–1
Malgin (Meier, Riat) – 35:36	2–1
Riat (Malgin, Meier) – 38:41	3–1
Privet (Hischier) – 51:05	4–1
Meier (Suter, Malgin) (PP) – 58:59	5–1

8 min
Penalties
26 min
42
Shots
21

January 3, 2016; 12:00	Belarus	2–6 (2–3, 0–3, 0–0)	Switzerland	Helsinki Ice Hall; Attendance: 748

Game reference

Vladislav Verbitski
Ivan Kulbakov
Goalies
Joren van Pottelberghe
Referees:
(Russia) Alexei Anisimov
(Sweden) Mikael Nord
Linesmen:
(Denmark) Rene Jensen
(Finland) Hannu Sormunen

	0–1	03:41 – Suter (Meier, Malgin) (PP)
	0–2	03:50 – Suter (Karrer, Siegenthaler)
	0–3	12:43 – Suter (Rod, Malgin) (PP)
Buinitsky (Vorobei, Bokun) – 15:20	1–3
Filippovich (Belevich, Patsenkin) – 16:44	2–3
	2–4	28:18 – Rod (Malgin, Kessler) (PP)
	2–5	31:52 – Thürkauf (Kessler, Riat)
	2–6	35:21 – Meyer (Thürkauf)

16 min
Penalties
14 min
23
Shots
44

Note: Belarus was relegated to the 2017 Division I A

=== Playoff round ===
Quarterfinals
1A	Sweden	6
4B	Slovakia	0
2B	Finland	6
3A	Canada	5
1B	Russia (OT)	4
4A	Denmark	3
2A	United States	7
3B	Czech Republic	0

Semifinals
1A	Sweden	1
2B	Finland	2
1B	Russia	2
2A	United States	1

Final
2B	Finland (OT)	4
1B	Russia	3
Bronze medal game
1A	Sweden	3
2A	United States	8

==== Quarterfinals ====
2 January 2016; 14:00	Russia	4–3 OT (1–0, 0–2, 2–1) (OT 1–0)	Denmark	Hartwall Arena, Helsinki; Attendance: 8,869

Game reference

Alexandar Georgiev
Goalies
Thomas Lillie
Referees:
(Finland) Aleksi Rantala
(Switzerland) Marc Wiegand
Linesmen:
(Slovenia) Matjaž Hribar
(Switzerland) Roman Kaderli

Korshkov (Kraskovsky, Rykov) – 2:49	1–0
	1–1	22:37 – Ma. Jensen (Holmberg, Olsen)
	1–2	29:20 – Olsen (K. Jensen, Nielsen)
Lauta (Dergachyov, Fazleyev) – 52:31	2–2
	2–3	54:36 – E. Christensen (Krogsgaard)
Kamenev (Lauta, Provorov) (EA) – 59:16	3–3
Kamenev (Provorov, Svetlakov) – 65:00	4–3

14 min
Penalties
2 min
46
Shots
21

2 January 2016; 16:00	Sweden	6–0 (2–0, 1–0, 3–0)	Slovakia	Helsinki Ice Hall, Helsinki; Attendance: 3,796

Game reference

Linus Söderström
Goalies
Adam Húska
Referees:
(Latvia) Andris Ansons
(Canada) Jean-Philippe Sylvain
Linesmen:
(Russia) Alexander Otmakhov
(Norway) Alexander Waldejer

Eriksson Ek (Forsbacka-Karlsson) – 5:10	1–0
Lindblom (Holmström, Kempe) (PP) – 11:35	2–0
Ehn (Lööke) – 30:07	3–0
Kempe (Holmström, Englund) – 43:43	4–0
Lööke (Forsbacka-Karlsson) (SH) – 45:36	5–0
A. Nylander (Timashov, Pettersson) – 56:57	6–0

12 min
Penalties
14 min
55
Shots
17

2 January 2016; 18:00	Finland	6–5 (1–2, 3–1, 2–2)	Canada	Hartwall Arena, Helsinki; Attendance: 13,016

Game reference

Veini Vehviläinen (out 27:20)
Kaapo Kähkönen (in 27:20)
Goalies
Mackenzie Blackwood
Referees:
(Germany) Daniel Piechaczek
(United States) Christopher Pitoscia
Linesmen:
(United States) Brian Oliver
(Sweden) Henrik Pihlblad

	0–1	5:21 – Konecny (Quenneville, Stephens)
	0–2	10:59 – Strome (Gauthier, Crouse)
Laine (Aho, Puljujärvi) – 19:49	1–2
Kalapudas (Juolevi, Tuulola) – 26:18	2–2
	2–3	27:20 – Crouse (Virtanen)
Saarela (Puljujärvi) (PP) – 35:44	3–3
Nättinen (Saarela, Juolevi) – 37:17	4–3
	4–4	43:14 – Marner (Point, Sanheim) (PP)
Aho (Puljujärvi, Laine) – 44:21	5–4
	5–5	45:57 – Marner (P. Point) (PP)
Laine (Juolevi, Aho) (PP2) – 54:10	6–5

12 min
Penalties
18 min
29
Shots
34

2 January 2016; 20:00	United States	7–0 (2–0, 3–0, 2–0)	Czech Republic	Helsinki Ice Hall, Helsinki; Attendance: 3,113

Game reference

Alex Nedeljkovic
Goalies
Vítek Vaněček (out 20:00)
Aleš Stezka (in 20:00)
Referees:
(Finland) Stefan Fonselius
(Canada) Brett Iverson
Linesmen:
(Canada) Nicolas Chartrand-Piché
(Finland) Pasi Nieminen

Schmaltz (Boeser) – 5:17	1–0
Dvorak (Carlo, Milano) – 15:14	2–0
Matthews (Borgen, Tkachuk) – 24:15	3–0
Matthews (Schmaltz, Werenski) (PP) – 29:08	4–0
Eansor (SH) – 38:04	5–0
Matthews (Schmaltz, Werenski) (PP) – 40:24	6–0
DeBrincat (Donato, MacInnis) – 51:53	7–0

6 min
Penalties
10 min
35
Shots
28

==== Semifinals ====
4 January 2016; 16:00	Sweden	1–2 (1–0, 0–2, 0–0)	Finland	Hartwall Arena, Helsinki; Attendance: 13,340

Game reference

Linus Söderström
Goalies
Kaapo Kähkönen
Referees:
(Germany) Daniel Piechaczek
(United States) Christopher Pitoscia
Linesmen:
(United States) Brian Oliver
(Russia) Alexander Otmakhov

Asplund (Timashov, Larsson) – 10:17	1–0
	1–1	31:08 – Hintz (Rantanen, Kapanen)
	1–2	33:04 – Kalapudas (Rantanen, Kapanen) (PP)

20 min
Penalties
6 min
22
Shots
28

4 January 2016; 20:00	Russia	2–1 (0–1, 2–0, 0–0)	United States	Hartwall Arena, Helsinki; Attendance: 11,812

Game reference

Ilya Samsonov
Goalies
Alex Nedeljkovic
Referees:
(Canada) Brett Iverson
(Switzerland) Marc Wiegand
Linesmen:
(Canada) Nicolas Chartrand-Piché
(Finland) Pasi Nieminen

	0–1	9:03 – Dvorak (Milano, Werenski)
Kraskovsky (Korshkov) – 35:08	1–1
Korshkov – 37:56	2–1

4 min
Penalties
8 min
33
Shots
27

==== Bronze medal game ====
5 January 2016; 16:00	Sweden	3–8 (2–2, 0–4, 1–2)	United States (bronze)	Hartwall Arena, Helsinki; Attendance: 10,889

Game reference

Felix Sandström
Goalies
Alex Nedeljkovic
Referees:
(Finland) Stefan Fonselius
(Finland) Aleksi Rantala
Linesmen:
(Canada) Nicolas Chartrand-Piché
(Finland) Pasi Nieminen

	0–1	11:59 – Bjork (Dvorak)
	0–2	15:32 – Tkachuk (Werenski, Schmaltz)
Lagesson (Kempe) – 17:39	1–2
Grundström (Eriksson Ek, Forsbacka-Karlsson) – 18:34	2–2
	2–3	22:17 – Boeser (Borgen, Tkachuk)
	2–4	24:06 – Donato (Carlo, MacInnis)
	2–5	36:31 – Bjork (Milano, Dvorak)
	2–6	39:51 – Carlo (Schmaltz, Hitchcock)
	2–7	43:38 – Donato (MacInnis)
	2–8	51:12 – Tkachuk (Schmaltz)
Holmström (Lindblom, Kempe) – 58:28	3–8

8 min
Penalties
10 min
38
Shots
29

==== Final ====
5 January 2016; 20:30	(silver) Russia	3–4 OT (1–0, 0–0, 2–3) (OT 0–1)	Finland (gold)	Hartwall Arena, Helsinki; Attendance: 13,479

Game reference

Alexandar Georgiev
Goalies
Kaapo Kähkönen
Referees:
(Canada) Brett Iverson
(United States) Christopher Pitoscia
Linesmen:
(United States) Brian Oliver
(Sweden) Henrik Pihlblad

Kamenev (Provorov, Lazarev) (PP) – 4:50	1–0
	1–1	40:24 – Laine (Aho, Puljujärvi)
Svetlakov – 41:41	2–1
	2–2	50:07 – Aho (Puljujärvi, Laine)
	2–3	57:51 – Rantanen (Saarijärvi, Kalapudas) (PP)
Svetlakov (Provorov, Rykov) (EA) – 59:54	3–3
	3–4	61:33 – Kapanen (Saarela)

40 min
Penalties
4 min
25
Shots
29

=== Statistics ===
==== Scoring leaders ====
Pos	Player	Country	GP	G	A	Pts	+/−	PIM
1	Jesse Puljujärvi	Finland	7	5	12	17	+8	0
2	Sebastian Aho	Finland	7	5	9	14	+9	4
3	Patrik Laine	Finland	7	7	6	13	+8	6
4	Auston Matthews	United States	7	7	4	11	+6	2
5	Matthew Tkachuk	United States	7	4	7	11	+7	6
6	Alexander Nylander	Sweden	7	4	5	9	+5	0
7	Zach Werenski	United States	7	2	7	9	+10	4
8	Denis Malgin	Switzerland	6	1	8	9	−1	6
9	Olli Juolevi	Finland	7	0	9	9	+6	4
10	Christian Dvorak	United States	7	3	5	8	+8	0
10	Adrian Kempe	Sweden	7	3	5	8	+1	8

GP = Games played; G = Goals; A = Assists; Pts = Points; +/− = Plus–minus; PIM = Penalties In Minutes

Source: IIHF

==== Goaltending leaders ====
(minimum 40% team's total ice time)

Pos	Player	Country	TOI	GA	GAA	Sv%	SO
1	Linus Söderström	Sweden	295:28	7	1.42	94.70	2
2	Alex Nedeljkovic	United States	325:52	9	1.66	94.27	1
3	Thomas Lillie	Denmark	185:00	10	3.24	91.45	0
4	Kaapo Kähkönen	Finland	214:13	9	2.52	90.91	0
5	Adam Húska	Slovakia	292:30	19	3.90	89.89	0

TOI = Time on ice (minutes:seconds); GA = Goals against; GAA = Goals against average; Sv% = Save percentage; SO = Shutouts
Source: IIHF

=== Tournament awards ===
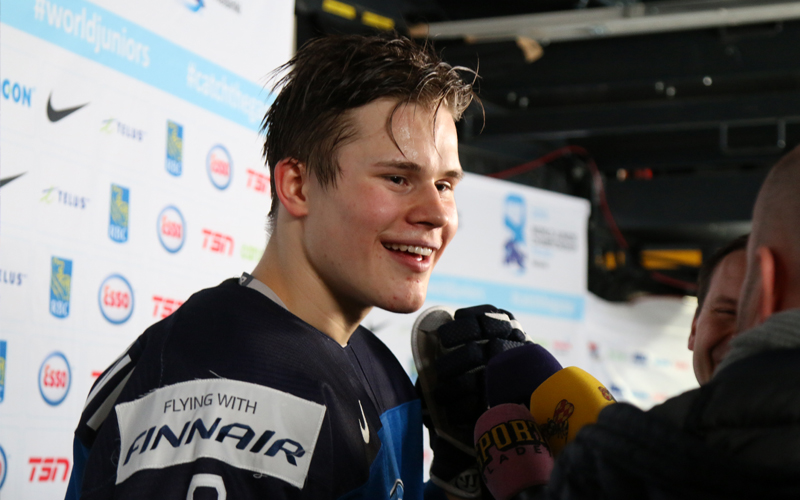
Jesse Puljujärvi being interviewed at the U20 World Championships 2016

Reference: Most Valuable Player

- Forward: (Finland) Jesse Puljujärvi

All-star team

- Goaltender: (Sweden) Linus Söderström
- Defencemen: (Finland) Olli Juolevi, (United States) Zach Werenski
- Forwards: (Finland) Jesse Puljujärvi, (Finland) Patrik Laine, (United States) Auston Matthews

IIHF best player awards

- Goaltender: (Sweden) Linus Söderström
- Defenceman: (United States) Zach Werenski
- Forward: (Finland) Jesse Puljujärvi

=== Final standings ===
Rank	Team
1st place, gold medalist(s)	Finland
2nd place, silver medalist(s)	Russia
3rd place, bronze medalist(s)	United States
4th	Sweden
5th	Czech Republic
6th	Canada
7th	Slovakia
8th	Denmark
9th	Switzerland
10th	Belarus

Relegated to the 2017 Division I A

2016 IIHF Junior World champions

Finland
4th title

Note that due to the lack of playoff games for determining the spots 5–8, these spots were determined by the preliminary round records for each team.

== Division I ==
=== Group A ===
The Division I A tournament was played in Vienna, Austria, from December 13 to 19, 2015.

Pos	Team	Pld	W	OTW	OTL	L	GF	GA	GD	Pts	Promotion or relegation
1	Latvia	5	4	1	0	0	20	7	+13	14	Promoted to the 2017 Top Division
2	Austria (H)	5	3	0	0	2	18	18	0	9	
3	Kazakhstan	5	2	1	0	2	21	13	+8	8	
4	Norway	5	1	1	2	1	21	14	+7	7	
5	Germany	5	2	0	1	2	10	14	−4	7	
6	Italy	5	0	0	0	5	5	29	−24	0	Relegated to the 2017 Division I B

Source: IIHF
(H) Host

=== Group B ===
The Division I B tournament was played in Megève, France, from December 12 to 18, 2015. Prior to the start of the tournament, Japan withdrew, and was relegated for 2017.

Pos	Team	Pld	W	OTW	OTL	L	GF	GA	GD	Pts	Promotion or relegation
1	France (H)	4	2	1	0	1	17	9	+8	8	Promoted to the 2017 Division I A
2	Poland	4	2	1	0	1	15	10	+5	8	
3	Great Britain	4	2	1	0	1	13	16	−3	8	
4	Ukraine	4	1	0	2	1	9	10	−1	5	
5	Slovenia	4	0	0	1	3	6	15	−9	1	
6	~~Japan~~	0	0	0	0	0	0	0	0	0	Withdrawn; relegated to the 2017 Division II A

Source: IIHF
(H) Host

== Division II ==
=== Group A ===
The Division II A tournament was played in Elektrėnai, Lithuania, from December 13 to 19, 2015.

Pos	Team	Pld	W	OTW	OTL	L	GF	GA	GD	Pts	Promotion or relegation
1	Hungary	5	5	0	0	0	36	9	+27	15	Promoted to the 2017 Division I B
2	Lithuania (H)	5	3	1	0	1	18	16	+2	11	
3	Estonia	5	3	0	0	2	27	26	+1	9	
4	Croatia	5	2	0	0	3	13	21	−8	6	
5	Netherlands	5	0	1	0	4	14	23	−9	2	
6	South Korea	5	0	0	2	3	15	28	−13	2	Relegated to the 2017 Division II B

Source: IIHF
Rules for classification: 1) points; 2) head-to-head points; 3) head-to-head goal difference; 4) head-to-head number of goals scored; 5) result against closest best-ranked team outside tied teams; 6) result against second-best ranked team outside tied teams; 7) seeding before tournament.
(H) Host

=== Group B ===
The Division II B tournament was played in Novi Sad, Serbia, from January 17 to 23, 2016.

Pos	Team	Pld	W	OTW	OTL	L	GF	GA	GD	Pts	Promotion or relegation
1	Romania	5	4	1	0	0	37	14	+23	14	Promoted to the 2017 Division II A
2	Spain	5	4	0	0	1	34	12	+22	12	
3	Serbia (H)	5	3	0	1	1	34	9	+25	10	
4	Belgium	5	2	0	0	3	14	21	−7	6	
5	Australia	5	1	0	0	4	11	35	−24	3	
6	China	5	0	0	0	5	6	45	−39	0	Relegated to the 2017 Division III

Source: IIHF
Rules for classification: 1) points; 2) head-to-head points; 3) head-to-head goal difference; 4) head-to-head number of goals scored; 5) result against closest best-ranked team outside tied teams; 6) result against second-best ranked team outside tied teams; 7) seeding before tournament.
(H) Host

== Division III ==
The Division III tournament was played in Mexico City, Mexico, from January 15 to 24, 2016.

Pos	Team	Pld	W	OTW	OTL	L	GF	GA	GD	Pts	Promotion
1	Mexico (H)	6	5	0	0	1	24	14	+10	15	Promoted to the 2017 Division II B
2	Bulgaria	6	4	0	0	2	18	13	+5	12	
3	New Zealand	6	4	0	0	2	29	16	+13	12	
4	Israel	6	3	0	1	2	39	23	+16	10	
5	Iceland	6	2	1	0	3	24	21	+3	8	
6	Turkey	6	2	0	0	4	20	15	+5	6	
7	South Africa	6	0	0	0	6	7	59	−52	0	

Source: IIHF
Rules for classification: 1) points; 2) head-to-head points; 3) head-to-head goal difference; 4) head-to-head number of goals scored; 5) result against closest best-ranked team outside tied teams; 6) result against second-best-ranked team outside tied teams; 7) seeding before tournament.
(H) Host
