= 2017 Karjala Tournament =

2017 Karjala Tournament (Euro Hockey Games)
Tournament details
- Host countries: Finland; Sweden; Switzerland
- Cities: Helsinki; Örebro; Biel/Bienne
- Venues: 3 (in 3 host cities)
- Dates: 8–12 November 2017
- Teams: 6

Final positions
- Champions: Finland (12th title)
- Runners-up: Russia
- Third place: Sweden
- Fourth place: Canada

Tournament statistics
- Games played: 9
- Goals scored: 51 (5.67 per game)
- Attendance: 57,266 (6,363 per game)
- Scoring leader: (Russia) Mikhail Grigorenko (6 points)

The 2017 Karjala Tournament was played between 8 and 12 November 2017. The Czech Republic, Finland, Sweden and Russia. The new teams involved in the tournament were Canada and Switzerland. One match watch played in Örebro, Sweden, match game in Biel/Bienne, Switzerland and the rest of the matches in Helsinki, Finland The tournament was part of 2017–18 Euro Hockey Tour.

Finland won the tournament, ahead of Russia and Sweden.

== Standings ==
Pos	Team	Pld	W	OTW	OTL	L	GF	GA	GD	Pts
1	Finland	3	3	0	0	0	10	6	+4	9
2	Russia	3	2	0	0	1	13	7	+6	6
3	Sweden	3	2	0	0	1	8	6	+2	6
4	Canada	3	1	0	0	2	6	8	−2	3
5	Czech Republic	3	1	0	0	2	8	12	−4	3
6	Switzerland	3	0	0	0	3	6	12	−6	0

Source: Swehockey

== Games ==
All times are local. Helsinki – (Eastern European Time – UTC+2) Biel/Bienne – (Central European Time – UTC+1)

8 November 2017; 19:00	Sweden	5–3 (1–1, 2–2, 2–0)	Czech Republic	Behrn Arena, Örebro; Attendance: 5,500

Game reference

Jhonas Enroth
Goalies
Pavel Francouz
Referees:
(Russia) Roman Gofman
(Russia) Konstantin Olenin
Linesmen:
(Sweden) Henrik Pihlblad
(Sweden) Jimmy Dahmén

	0–1	J. Nakládal (A. Nestrašil, L. Radil) (PP) – 12:55
D. Everberg (J. Ahnelöv, A. Lander) – 14:45	1–1
	1–2	M. Birner ( M. Řepík, T. Kundrátek) – 21:55
O. Möller (J. Lindström) – 29:53	2–2
J. Lindström (S. Kronwall) (PP) – 32:07	3–2
	3–3	L. Radil (J. Klepiš, J. Nakládal) – 35:22
D. Axelsson (A. Petersson, L. Omark) (PP) – 48:25	4–3
D. Axelsson (A. Petersson) (PP) – 57:42	5–3

4 min
Penalties
8 min
24
Shots
23

8 November 2017; 20:15	Switzerland	2–3 (0–0, 1–3, 1–0)	Canada	Tissot Arena, Biel/Bienne; Attendance: 5,476

Game reference

Jonas Hiller
Goalies
Ben Scrivens
Referees:
(Sweden) Marcus Vinnerborg
(Switzerland) Daniel Sticker

M. Fora (C. Almond, L. Martschini) – 25:43	1–0
	1–1	G. Brulé (S. Després, C. Genoway) – 28:24
	1–2	E. O'Dell (K. Stollery, Z. Whitecloud) – 35:43
	1–3	M. Ellison (G. Kinrade) – 36:47
R. Loeffel (F. Du Bois, G. Hofmann) – 58:02	2–3

10 min
Penalties
6 min
25
Shots
28

9 November 2017; 18:30	Finland	3–2 (1–0, 1–2, 1–0)	Russia	Hartwall Arena, Helsinki; Attendance: 10,860

Game reference

Mikko Koskinen
Goalies
Ilya Sorokin
Referees:
(Sweden) Tobias Björk
(Sweden) Linus Öhlund

J. Kemppainen (J. Junttila, M. Koivisto) – 01:55	1–0
M. Heiskanen (A. Pihlström, M. Anttila) – 23:10	2–0
	2–1	K. Kaprizov (N. Gusev) – 26:41
	2–2	S. Plotnikov (I. Telegin) – 37:007
A. Ohtamaa (M. Anttila) – 50:52	3–2

31 min
Penalties
29 min
24
Shots
17

10 November 2017; 15:00	Czech Republic	3–2 (2–0, 1–1, 0–1)	Switzerland	Hartwall Arena, Helsinki; Attendance: 1,320

Game reference

Marek Mazanec
Goalies
Gilles Senn
Referees:
(Finland) Mikko Kaukokari
(Finland) Lassi Heikkinen
Linesmen:
(Finland) Daniel Österholm
(Finland) Lauri Nikulainen

M. Gulaš (J. Krejčík, D. Kubalík) (PP) – 02:02	1–0
L. Radil (J. Klepiš) (PP) – 19:46	2–0
	2–1	G. Haas (V. Praplan, D. Hollenstein) – 22:50
D. Kubalík (M. Gulaš) (2PP) – 32:52	3–1
	3–2	A. Ambühl (F. Du Bois, R. Loeffel) – 50:54

8 min
Penalties
16 min
29
Shots
24

10 November 2017; 18:30	Canada	0–2 (0–0, 0–1, 0–1)	Sweden	Hartwall Arena, Helsinki; Attendance: 2,132

Game reference
Ben Scrivens	Goalies	Magnus Hellberg	Referees: (Finland) Anssi Salonen (Finland) Stefan Fonselius; Linesmen: (Finland) Sakari Suominen (Finland) Markus Hägerström
0–1 / P. Lindholm (P. Hersley, R. Dahlin) (PP) – 36:02; 0–2 / P. Lindholm (O. Möller, J. Lindström) (PP) – 51:53			Referees: (Finland) Anssi Salonen (Finland) Stefan Fonselius; Linesmen: (Finland) Sakari Suominen (Finland) Markus Hägerström
37 min	Penalties	16 min	Referees: (Finland) Anssi Salonen (Finland) Stefan Fonselius; Linesmen: (Finland) Sakari Suominen (Finland) Markus Hägerström
35	Shots	21	Referees: (Finland) Anssi Salonen (Finland) Stefan Fonselius; Linesmen: (Finland) Sakari Suominen (Finland) Markus Hägerström

11 November 2017; 13:30	Switzerland	2–6 (2–1. 0–0, 0–5)	Russia	Hartwall Arena, Helsinki; Attendance: 2,713

Game reference

Jonas Hiller
Goalies
Ilya Sorokin
Referees:
(Finland) Anssi Salonen
(Finland) Aleksi Rantala

	0–1	S. Shirokov (N. Gusev, N. Nesterov) (PP) – 04:19
S. Moser (F. Du Bois, A. Ambühl) (PP2) – 14:49	1–1
V. Praplan (G. Haas, R. Schäppi) (PP) – 19:34	2–1
	2–2	S. Kalinin (M. Grigorenko, P. Kraskovsky) – 46:04
	2–3	N. Nesterov (N. Gusev, D. Khafizullin) – 46:05
	2–4	V. Nichushkin (S. Mozyakin, B. Kiselevich) – 50:01
	2–5	M. Grigorenko (P. Kraskovsky, V. Tokranov) – 51:08
	2–6	V. Tkachev (S. Mozyakin, M. Grigorenko) – 59:47

10 min
Penalties
33 min
33
Shots
34

11 November 2017; 17:30	Finland	3–1 (1–0, 2–1, 0–0)	Sweden	Hartwall Arena, Helsinki; Attendance: 13,085

Game reference

Mikko Koskinen
Goalies
Magnus Hellberg Jhonas Enroth(31:19)
Referees:
(Czech Republic) Robin Šír
(Czech Republic) René Hradil
Linesmen:
Hannu Sormunen
Henri Neve

E. Tolvanen (P. Kontiola) – 03:20	1–0
J. Peltola (E. Tolvanen) – 20:50	2–0
S. Manninen (J. Lajunen, M. Pyörälä) – 30:59	3–0
	3–1	F. Pettersson (E. Gustafsson, R. Nilsson) – 31:19

8 min
Penalties
6 min
19
Shots
17

12 November 2017; 13:30	Russia	5–2 (2–0, 2–1, 1–1)	Czech Republic	Hartwall Arena, Helsinki; Attendance: 3,143

Game reference

Ilya Sorokin
Goalies
Marek Mazanec
Referees:
(Finland) Aleksi Rantala
(Finland) Stefan Fonselius
Linesmen:
(Finland) Sakari Suominen
(Finland) Markus Hägerström

M. Grigorenko (V. Tokranov) – 04:23	1–0
M. Grigorenko (S. Kalinin) – 11:10	2–0
K. Kaprizov (N. Gusev, N. Nesterov) (PP2) – 23:40	3–0
	3–1	D. Kubalík (J. Kovář, M. Řepík) (PP) – 30:36
M. Grigorenko (P. Kraskovsky) – 33:06	4–1
D. Khafizullin (S. Mozyakin, V. Tkachev) – 55:36	5–1
	5–2	J. Klepiš (J. Kovář) – 59:52

6 min
Penalties
18 min
35
Shots
28

12 November 2017; 17:30	Finland	4–3 (1–1, 1–1, 2–1)	Canada	Hartwall Arena, Helsinki; Attendance: 13,037

Game reference

Eero Kilpeläinen
Goalies
Ben Scrivens
Referees:
(Czech Republic) Robin Šír
(Czech Republic) René Hradil

	0–1	G. Brulé (M. Ellison, W. Wolski) – 02:22
J. Lajunen (S. Manninen, M. Pyörälä) – 12:19	1–1
	1–2	M. Noreau (T. Purcell) (PP) – 29:36
S. Lepistö (M. Pyörälä) (PP) – 39:54	2–2
M. Heiskanen (J. Lajunen, A. Erkinjuntti) – 39:54	3–2
	3–3	C. Thomas – 46:25
E. Tolvanen (S. Lepistö, M. Pyörälä) (PP) – 52:36	4–3

8 min
Penalties
12 min
30
Shots
28

== Scoring leaders ==
Pos	Player	Country	GP	G	A	Pts	+/−	PIM	POS
1	Mikhail Grigorenko	Russia	3	4	2	6	+7	0	F
2	Mika Pyörälä	Finland	3	0	4	4	+3	0	F
3	Nikita Gusev	Russia	3	0	4	4	+1	0	F
4	Lukáš Radil	Czech Republic	3	2	1	3	-3	0	F
5	Dominik Kubalík	Czech Republic	3	2	1	3	0	0	F

GP = Games played; G = Goals; A = Assists; Pts = Points; +/− = Plus/minus; PIM = Penalties in minutes; POS = Position
Source: quanthockey

== Goaltending leaders ==
Pos	Player	Country	TOI	GA	GAA	Sv%	SO
1	Ilya Sorokin	Russia	120:00	1	0.50	98.18	1
2	Mikko Koskinen	Finland	81:52	2	1.47	93.33	0
3	Igor Shesterkin	Russia	60:00	2	2.00	92.59	0
4	Joel Lassinantti	Sweden	83:08	5	3.61	89.36	0
5	Harri Säteri	Finland	96:45	7	4.34	87.04	0
6	Šimon Hrubec	Czech Republic	60:00	3	3.00	86.36	0
7	Dominik Furch	Czech Republic	120:00	6	3.00	86.05	0
8	Niklas Svedberg	Czech Republic	93:19	7	4.50	84.09	0

TOI = Time on ice (minutes:seconds); SA = Shots against; GA = Goals against; GAA = Goals Against Average; Sv% = Save percentage; SO = Shutouts
Source: swehockey

== Tournament awards ==
The tournament directorate named the following players in the tournament 2012:

- Best goalkeeper: (Finland) Mikko Koskinen
- Best defenceman: (Czech Republic) Jakub Nakládal
- Best forward: (Russia) Mikhail Grigorenko
