= Namestnikov =

Namestnikov (Russian: Наместников) is a Russian masculine surname, its feminine counterpart is Namestnikova. It may refer to

- Evgeny Namestnikov (born 1971), Russian ice hockey player, father of Vladislav
- Vladislav Namestnikov (born 1992), Russian-American professional ice hockey forward
