= Karaban =

Karaban is a surname. Notable people with the surname include:

- Alex Karaban (born 2002), American basketball player
- Danila Karaban (born 1996), Belarusian ice hockey player
- Jason Karaban (fl. from 1997), American singer-songwriter and musician

== See also ==
- Carabane
