= Juho Lammikko =

Finnish ice hockey player (born 1996)

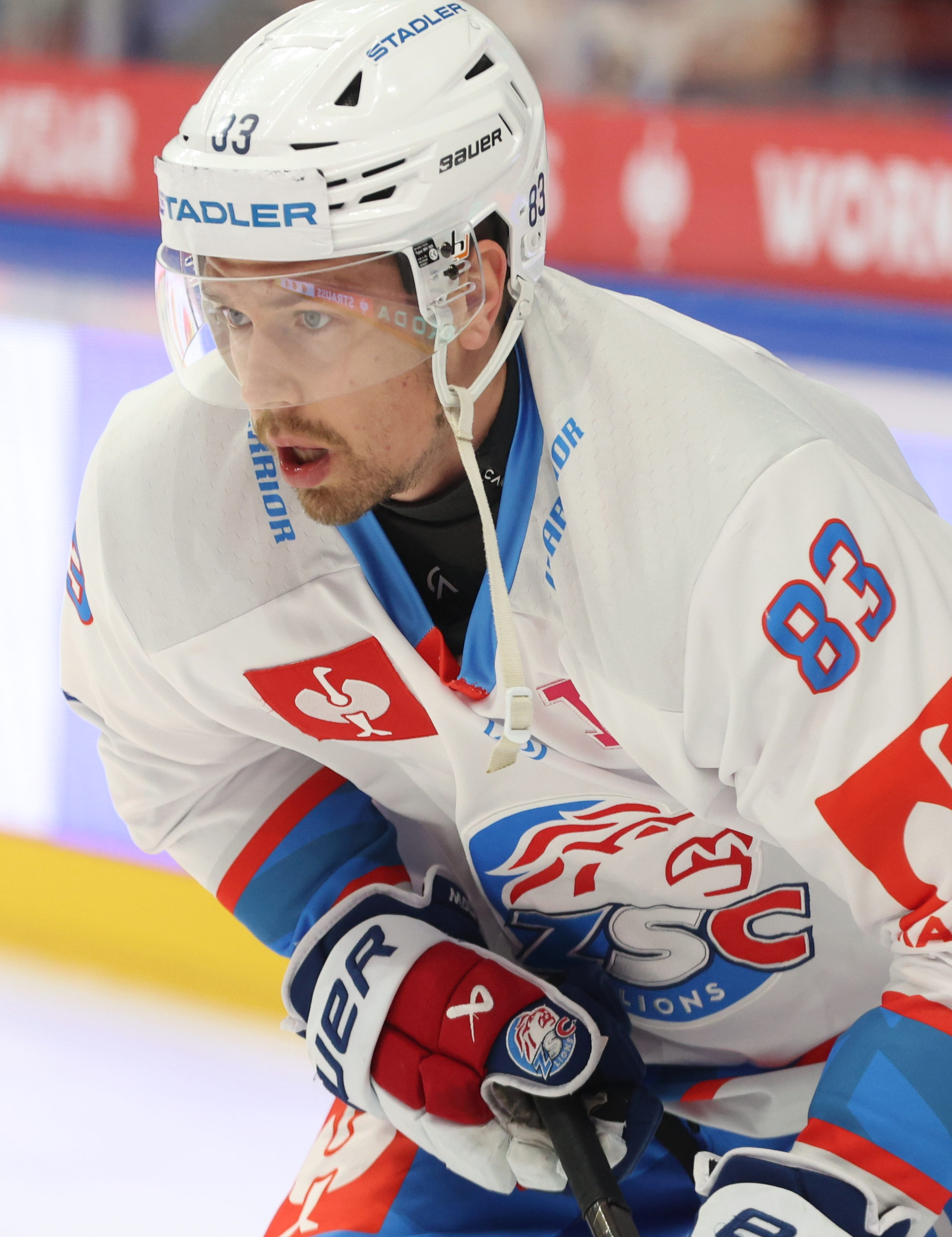
- Lammikko with the ZSC Lions in 2024
- Born: 29 January 1996 (age 30) Noormarkku, Finland
- Height: 6 ft 2 in (188 cm)
- Weight: 191 lb (87 kg; 13 st 9 lb)
- Position: Forward
- Shoots: Left
- NL team Former teams: ZSC Lions; Ässät; Florida Panthers; Oulun Kärpät; Metallurg Magnitogorsk; Vancouver Canucks; New Jersey Devils
- National team: Finland
- NHL draft: 65th overall, 2014; Florida Panthers
- Playing career: 2013–present

Juho Lammikko (born 29 January 1996) is a Finnish professional ice hockey player who is a forward for ZSC Lions of the National League (NL). He has previously played in the National Hockey League (NHL) for the Florida Panthers, Vancouver Canucks and New Jersey Devils.

== Playing career ==
=== Porin Ässät ===
Lammikko made his Liiga debut with Ässät during the 2013–14 Liiga season, appearing in 20 games and recording an assist. He also played in 37 games with the Ässät under 20 team, scoring 17 goals and 42 points, followed by three goals and eight points in 11 playoff games. Following the season, Lammikko was drafted by the Florida Panthers in the third round of the 2014 NHL entry draft.

Lammikko returned to Ässät at the beginning of the 2015–16 Liiga season, scoring two goals in five games, before returning to his OHL team, the Kingston Frontenacs.

=== Kingston Frontenacs ===
Lammikko was drafted 43rd overall by the Kingston Frontenacs of the Ontario Hockey League in the 2014 CHL Import Draft. In his first game with the Frontenacs, Lammikko scored his first career OHL goal against Jason Da Silva of the Peterborough Petes, and added two assists, in a 5–3 victory. Overall, Lammikko appeared in 64 games with Kingston, scoring 18 goals and 44 points, and had a team high +23 rating. In the playoffs, Lammikko had a goal and two points in four games.

Lammikko returned to the Frontenacs for the 2015–16 season, and in 59 games, he scored 22 goals and 55 points. On 15 February, Lammikko earned his first career hat-trick, scoring three goals against Mackenzie Blackwood of the Barrie Colts in a 6–4 victory, and on 18 March, Lammikko scored two goals and added two assists for four points in a 7–0 win over the Oshawa Generals. In the post-season, Lammikko scored three goals and seven points in nine games.

=== Florida Panthers ===
Lammikko was drafted by the Florida Panthers at the 2014 NHL entry draft with the Panthers' third-round pick, 65th overall. On 15 April 2016, the Panthers signed Lammikko to a three-year entry-level contract, and assigned him to their AHL affiliate, the Portland Pirates. He appeared in one game with the Pirates in the 2015–16 season, earning no points.

After attending the Panthers 2018 training camp, and despite strong pre-season showing Lammikko was initially returned to begin the 2018–19 season with the Springfield Thunderbirds. Lammikko played one game before he received his first NHL recall to the Panthers, due to an injury to Derek MacKenzie on 9 October 2018.

=== Oulun Kärpät ===
At the conclusion of his entry-level contract, Lammikko as a restricted free agent, opted to return to Finland to further develop his offensive game. With his rights retained by the Panthers, Lammikko signed a one-year contract with Oulun Kärpät of the Liiga on 12 July 2019. In the 2019–20 season, Lammikko made an instant impact with Kärpät earning Liiga player of the month honours for October. In 57 regular season games with the Liiga leading Kärpät, Lammikko collected 22 goals and 51 points, before the season was cancelled due to the COVID-19 pandemic.

=== Metallurg Magnitogorsk ===
With his rights still held by the Panthers, Lammikko opted to continue his career abroad by signing a one-year contract with Russian club, Metallurg Magnitogorsk of the Kontinental Hockey League (KHL) on 4 June 2020. His KHL rights were earlier acquired by Mettalurg from Spartak Moscow on 1 June. In the 2020–21 season, Lammikko in a top-nine forward role, produced 6 goals and 8 points through 22 regular season games.

=== Return to Florida ===
With his NHL right's still held by the Panthers, and with the club under new management, Lammikko ended his stint in Russia with Metallurg and returned to the Florida Panthers in agreeing to a one-year, two-way contract on 25 November 2020.

=== Vancouver Canucks ===
Prior to the commencement of the 2021–22 season, on 10 October 2021, Lammikko was traded by the Panthers to the Vancouver Canucks, along with Noah Juulsen, in exchange for Olli Juolevi. Lammikko appeared in a career best 75 games with the Canucks and registered new offensive highs with 7 goals and 8 assists for 15 points.

As a restricted free agent having concluded his contract with Vancouver, Lammikko was not tendered a qualifying offer by the Canucks and was released as a free agent on 11 July 2022.

=== ZSC Lions ===
Unable to garner a satisfactory NHL contract, Lammikko returned to Europe after agreeing to a one-year contract with Swiss club, ZSC Lions of the National League (NL), on 4 August 2022.

=== New Jersey Devils ===
After three years in the Swiss National League with ZSC Lions, Lammikko returned to the NHL in securing a one-year, $800,000 contract with the New Jersey Devils for the 2025–26 season on 16 June 2025. In a depth forward role, Lammikko was unable to translate his offensive instinct to the NHL posting just two assists through 24 appearances. He was placed on unconditional waivers by the Devils and once cleared his contract was mutually terminated on 6 February 2026.

=== Return to ZSC ===
As a free agent, Lammikko opted to immediately return to former Swiss club, ZSC Lions of the NL, in agreeing to a three-year contract on 7 February 2026.

== Career statistics ==
=== Regular season and playoffs ===
			Regular season					Playoffs
Season	Team	League	GP	G	A	Pts	PIM	GP	G	A	Pts	PIM
2011–12	Ässät	FIN U18	2	0	1	1	0	—	—	—	—	—
2011–12	Ässät	FIN U20	2	0	1	1	0	—	—	—	—	—
2012–13	Ässät	FIN U18	31	21	32	53	22	9	5	6	11	12
2012–13	Ässät	FIN U20	15	0	1	1	10	—	—	—	—	—
2013–14	Ässät	FIN U20	37	17	25	42	32	11	3	5	8	28
2013–14	Ässät	Liiga	20	0	1	1	0	—	—	—	—	—
2014–15	Kingston Frontenacs	OHL	64	18	26	44	36	4	1	1	2	8
2015–16	Ässät	Liiga	5	2	0	2	4	—	—	—	—	—
2015–16	Kingston Frontenacs	OHL	59	22	33	55	51	9	3	4	7	6
2015–16	Portland Pirates	AHL	1	0	0	0	2	—	—	—	—	—
2016–17	Springfield Thunderbirds	AHL	47	6	5	11	24	—	—	—	—	—
2017–18	Springfield Thunderbirds	AHL	59	8	20	28	16	—	—	—	—	—
2018–19	Springfield Thunderbirds	AHL	36	6	12	18	22	—	—	—	—	—
2018–19	Florida Panthers	NHL	40	0	6	6	6	—	—	—	—	—
2019–20	Kärpät	Liiga	57	22	29	51	48	—	—	—	—	—
2020–21	Metallurg Magnitogorsk	KHL	22	6	2	8	8	—	—	—	—	—
2020–21	Florida Panthers	NHL	44	4	1	5	10	—	—	—	—	—
2021–22	Vancouver Canucks	NHL	75	7	8	15	14	—	—	—	—	—
2022–23	ZSC Lions	NL	52	24	16	40	32	8	2	2	4	4
2023–24	ZSC Lions	NL	44	11	23	34	28	11	5	2	7	4
2024–25	ZSC Lions	NL	48	13	25	38	32	13	5	3	8	6
2025–26	New Jersey Devils	NHL	24	0	2	2	4	—	—	—	—	—
Liiga totals			82	24	30	54	52	—	—	—	—	—
NHL totals			183	11	17	28	34	—	—	—	—	—
KHL totals			22	6	2	8	8	—	—	—	—	—
NL totals			144	48	64	112	92	32	12	7	9	14

=== International ===
Medal record

Men's ice hockey

Representing Finland

World Championships
Gold medal – first place	2019 Slovakia	
Gold medal – first place	2022 Finland	

World Junior Championships
Gold medal – first place	2016 Finland	

Year	Team	Event	Result	GP	G	A	Pts	PIM
2013	Finland	U17	7th	5	0	6	6	2
2013	Finland	IH18	5th	4	3	3	6	6
2014	Finland	U18	6th	5	2	4	6	2
2016	Finland	WJC	1st place, gold medalist(s)	7	0	0	0	2
2019	Finland	WC	1st place, gold medalist(s)	7	0	0	0	0
2022	Finland	WC	1st place, gold medalist(s)	10	0	2	2	5
2023	Finland	WC	7th	8	2	1	3	2
2025	Finland	WC	7th	8	0	3	3	2
Junior totals				21	5	13	18	12
Senior totals				33	2	6	8	9
