= Gustav Forsling =

Swedish ice hockey player (born 1996)

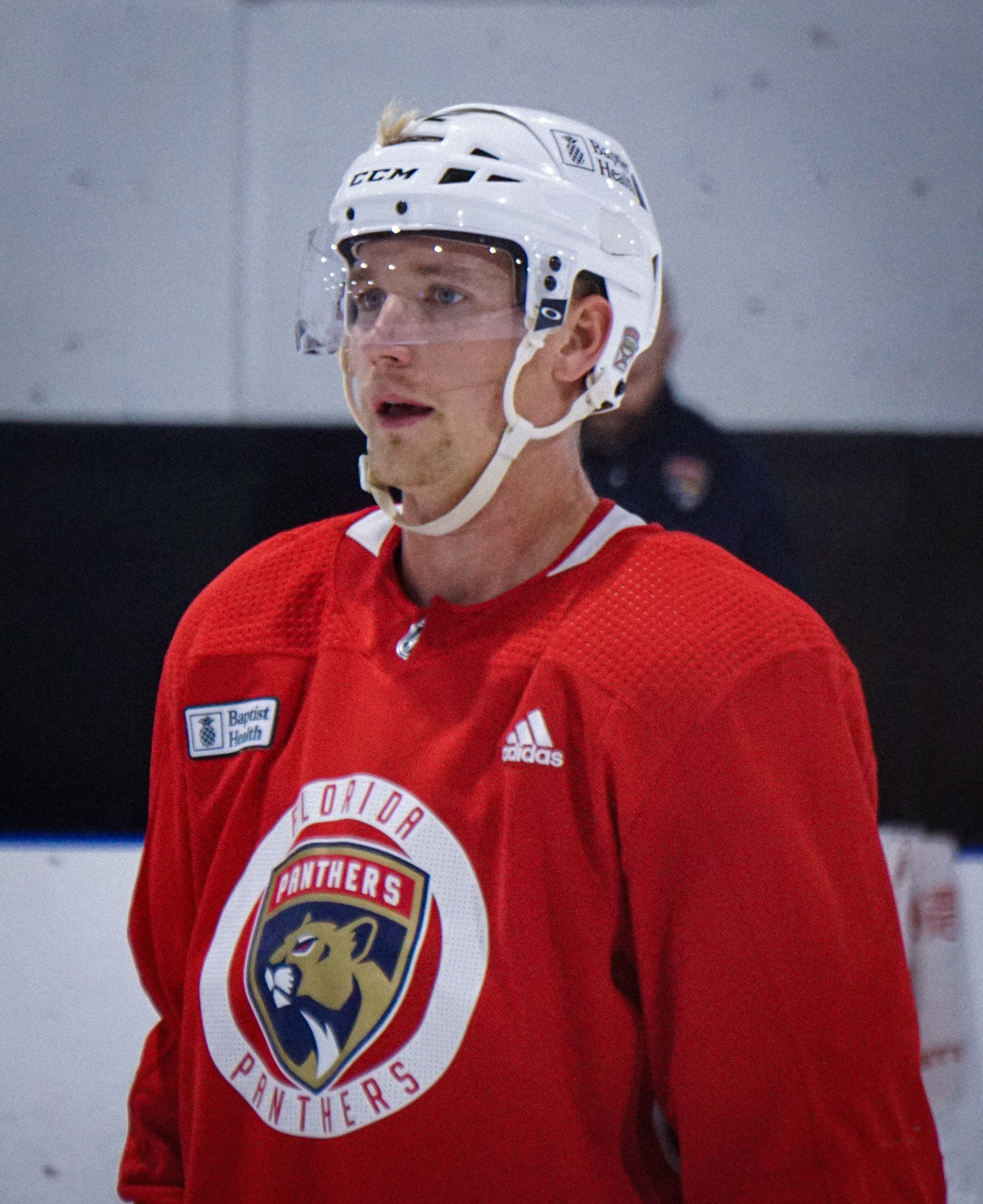
- Forsling with the Florida Panthers in 2023
- Born: 12 June 1996 (age 30) Linköping, Sweden
- Height: 6 ft 0 in (183 cm)
- Weight: 181 lb (82 kg; 12 st 13 lb)
- Position: Defence
- Shoots: Left
- NHL team Former teams: Florida Panthers; Linköpings HC; Chicago Blackhawks
- National team: Sweden
- NHL draft: 126th overall, 2014; Vancouver Canucks
- Playing career: 2014–present

Gustav Forsling (born 12 June 1996) is a Swedish professional ice hockey player who is a defenceman for the Florida Panthers of the National Hockey League (NHL). Forsling was selected by the Vancouver Canucks in the fifth round (126th overall) of the 2014 NHL entry draft, but did not play for the team. He previously played for the Chicago Blackhawks. Forsling won back-to-back Stanley Cup championships with the Panthers in 2024 and 2025.

== Playing career ==
A product of Linköpings HC, Forsling made his senior Swedish Hockey League (SHL) debut with the club during the 2014–15 SHL season. After his selection by the Vancouver Canucks in the 2014 NHL entry draft, Forsling's NHL rights were traded to the Chicago Blackhawks in exchange for Adam Clendening on 29 January 2015.

On 11 May 2016, he signed a three-year contract with the Chicago Blackhawks. He made the Blackhawks' opening night roster to begin his first North American season in 2016–17. On 13 November, Forsling scored his first NHL goal in a 3–2 win against the Montreal Canadiens. He was later reassigned to AHL affiliate, the Rockford IceHogs on 6 January 2017.

On 24 June 2019, Forsling was traded by the Blackhawks, along with Anton Forsberg to the Carolina Hurricanes in exchange for Calvin de Haan and Aleksi Saarela. On 16 July, he was re-signed to a one-year contract by the Hurricanes. During the 2020 off-season, on 24 October 2020, Forsling signed a one-year contract with Carolina.

On 8 January 2021, Forsling was placed on waivers by the Hurricanes prior to the delayed 2020–21 season. The following day, he was subsequently claimed by the Florida Panthers. On 15 July, the Panthers signed Forsling to a three-year, $8 million contract extension.

On 7 March 2024, Forsling was signed to an eight-year, $46 million contract extension by the Panthers. Forsling earned his first Stanley Cup championship when the Panthers won the seventh game of the Stanley Cup Final against the Edmonton Oilers on 24 June. In the following season, Forsling earned his second consecutive Stanley Cup championship as the Panthers returned to the Stanley Cup Final for a third straight year, defeating the Edmonton Oilers for a second straight year in six games.

== International play ==
Forsling represented Sweden's junior national teams on several occasions. Serving as captain for Sweden, he was named to the All-Star team at the 2015 World Junior Championships. He his first played for Sweden senior team during the 2015–16 Euro Hockey Tour.

== Personal life ==
Forsling has an older brother, Hampus and a younger brother, Hannes.

== Career statistics ==
=== Regular season and playoffs ===
			Regular season					Playoffs
Season	Team	League	GP	G	A	Pts	PIM	GP	G	A	Pts	PIM
2011–12	Linköpings HC	J18	9	3	0	3	0	—	—	—	—	—
2011–12	Linköpings HC	J18 Allsv	18	2	3	5	10	3	0	1	1	0
2012–13	Linköpings HC	J18	14	2	6	8	10	—	—	—	—	—
2012–13	Linköpings HC	J18 Allsv	17	5	2	7	10	2	0	0	0	0
2012–13	Linköpings HC	J20	14	0	1	1	8	1	0	0	0	0
2013–14	Linköpings HC	J18	2	1	2	3	0	—	—	—	—	—
2013–14	Linköpings HC	J18 Allsv	3	2	1	3	2	5	1	0	1	0
2013–14	Linköpings HC	J20	44	6	12	18	36	2	1	3	4	2
2014–15	Linköpings HC	SHL	38	3	3	6	8	—	—	—	—	—
2015–16	Linköpings HC	SHL	48	6	15	21	4	6	1	2	3	4
2016–17	Chicago Blackhawks	NHL	38	2	3	5	4	—	—	—	—	—
2016–17	Rockford IceHogs	AHL	30	1	7	8	12	—	—	—	—	—
2017–18	Chicago Blackhawks	NHL	41	3	10	13	8	—	—	—	—	—
2017–18	Rockford IceHogs	AHL	18	2	3	5	6	13	1	4	5	6
2018–19	Rockford IceHogs	AHL	5	0	2	2	2	—	—	—	—	—
2018–19	Chicago Blackhawks	NHL	43	3	6	9	30	—	—	—	—	—
2019–20	Charlotte Checkers	AHL	57	8	18	26	30	—	—	—	—	—
2020–21	Florida Panthers	NHL	43	5	12	17	8	6	1	1	2	0
2021–22	Florida Panthers	NHL	71	10	27	37	18	10	0	3	3	4
2022–23	Florida Panthers	NHL	82	13	28	41	40	21	2	6	8	10
2023–24	Florida Panthers	NHL	79	10	29	39	43	24	4	9	13	12
2024–25	Florida Panthers	NHL	80	11	20	31	16	23	1	4	5	8
2025–26	Florida Panthers	NHL	80	2	26	28	51	—	—	—	—	—
SHL totals			86	9	18	27	12	6	1	2	3	4
NHL totals			557	59	161	220	218	84	8	23	31	34

=== International ===
Year	Team	Event	Result	GP	G	A	Pts	PIM
2013	Sweden	U17	1st place, gold medalist(s)	6	0	2	2	2
2013	Sweden	IH18	7th	4	0	0	0	6
2014	Sweden	WJC18	4th	7	4	1	5	2
2015	Sweden	WJC	4th	7	3	5	8	0
2016	Sweden	WJC	4th	6	2	1	3	0
2025	Sweden	4NF	3rd place, bronze medalist(s)	3	0	0	0	0
2026	Sweden	OG	7th	5	1	1	2	4
Junior totals				30	9	9	18	10
Senior totals				8	1	1	2	4

== Awards and honours ==
Award	Year	Ref
NHL
Stanley Cup champion	2024, 2025	
