= Aleksi Saarela =

Finnish ice hockey player (born 1997)

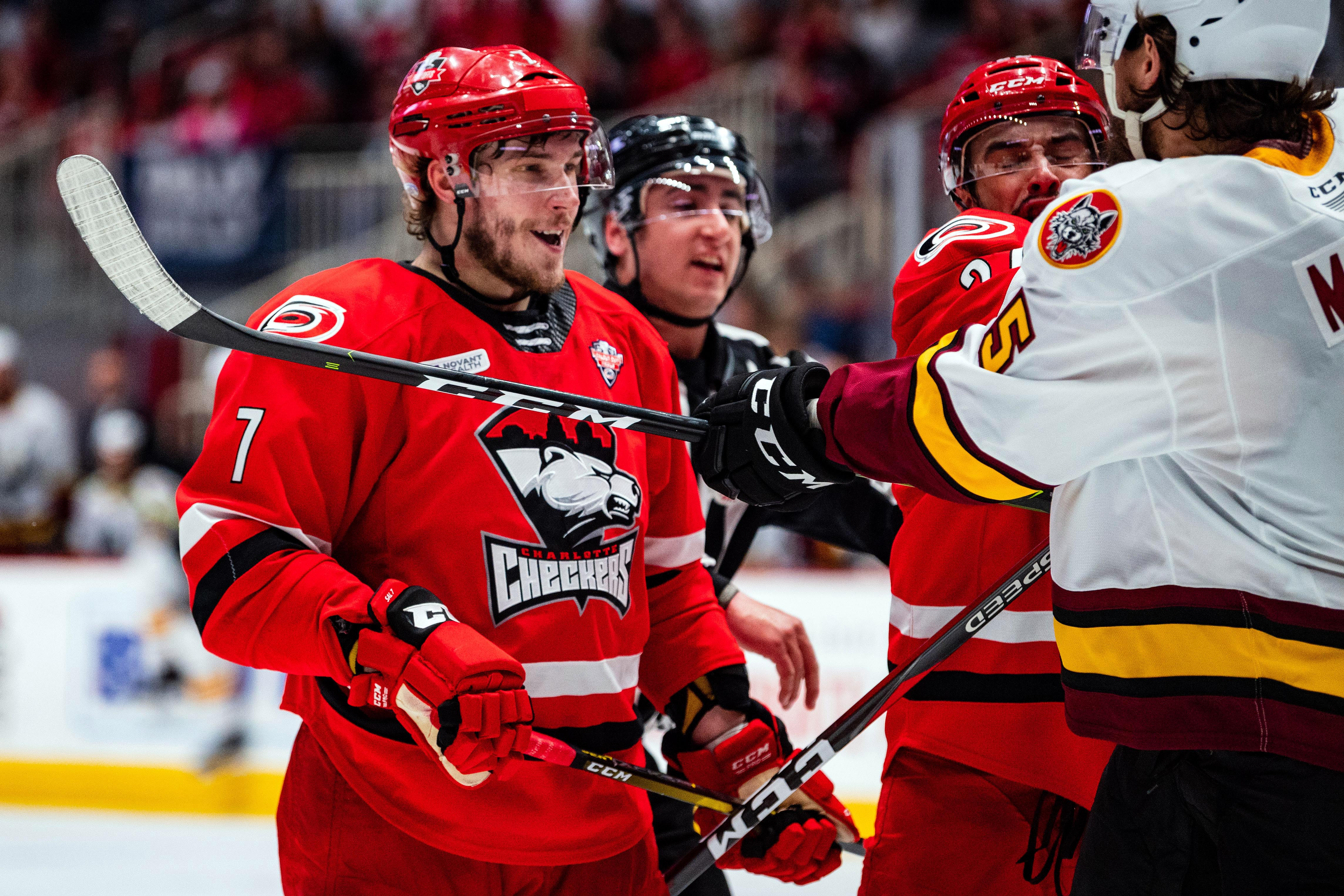
- Saarela with the Charlotte Checkers in 2019
- Born: 7 January 1997 (age 29) Helsinki, Finland
- Height: 5 ft 11 in (180 cm)
- Weight: 198 lb (90 kg; 14 st 2 lb)
- Position: Centre
- Shoots: Left
- NL team Former teams: SCL Tigers; Lukko; Ässät; Carolina Hurricanes; Florida Panthers
- NHL draft: 89th overall, 2015; New York Rangers
- Playing career: 2013–present

Aleksi Saarela (born 7 January 1997) is a Finnish professional ice hockey forward who is currently playing with the SCL Tigers of the National League (NL). He was originally selected 89th overall in the 2015 NHL entry draft by the New York Rangers.

== Playing career ==
Saarela made his SM-liiga debut playing with Lukko during the 2012–13 SM-liiga season. On 28 February 2016, the rights to Saarela, along with a 2016 second-round draft pick and a 2017 second-round draft pick, were traded from the New York Rangers to the Carolina Hurricanes in exchange for Eric Staal.

In the 2015–16 season, Saarela led Porin Ässät with 20 goals and finished third in overall scoring with 33 points in 51 games. On 20 April 2016, he signed a one-year contract to return to his original club, Lukko, on a one-year contract. Under two months later, on 13 June 2016, Saarela was then signed to a three-year entry-level contract with the Carolina Hurricanes.

On 3 January 2018, Saarela was recalled by the Carolina Hurricanes from the Charlotte Checkers prior to a game with the Pittsburgh Penguins. However, it was short lived as he was sent back down days later without playing a game.

He made his NHL debut during game five of the Hurricanes' first round playoff series against the Washington Capitals.

On June 24, 2019, Saarela was traded by the Hurricanes, along with Calvin de Haan, to the Chicago Blackhawks in exchange for Gustav Forsling and Anton Forsberg.

Saarela participated in the Blackhawks 2019 training camp, before he was reassigned to begin the 2019–20 season in the AHL with the Rockford IceHogs. Unable to crack Chicago's roster, Saarela requested a trade and after just 5 games with the IceHogs Saarela was dealt by the Blackhawks to the Florida Panthers in exchange for Ian McCoshen on October 23, 2019. He was directly assigned to report to the Panthers' AHL affiliate, the Springfield Thunderbirds.

On 22 August 2020, following the Panthers' elimination from the 2020 Stanley Cup playoffs, Saarela returned to original club, Lukko of the Liiga, as a restricted free agent from the Panthers due to the delayed 2020–21 North American season.

On August 6, 2021, Saarela agreed to a one-year deal with the SCL Tigers of the National League (NL). In October of the same year, Saarela signed a two-year extension. Saarela stayed with the club until the end of the 2024-25 season, when he and the SCL Tigers agreed to terminate his contract, which extended until the end of the 2026–27 season, as Saarela was conscripted for his obligatory military service with the Finnish Defence Forces.

== Career statistics ==
=== Regular season and playoffs ===
			Regular season					Playoffs
Season	Team	League	GP	G	A	Pts	PIM	GP	G	A	Pts	PIM
2012–13	Lukko	Jr. A	22	8	10	18	6	10	2	6	8	2
2012–13	Lukko	SM-l	3	1	1	2	0	—	—	—	—	—
2013–14	Lukko	Jr. A	17	6	16	22	8	—	—	—	—	—
2013–14	Lukko	Liiga	12	0	2	2	2	—	—	—	—	—
2014–15	Ässät	Liiga	51	6	6	12	18	2	0	0	0	0
2015–16	Ässät	Liiga	51	20	13	33	14	—	—	—	—	—
2016–17	Lukko	Liiga	49	15	13	28	10	—	—	—	—	—
2016–17	Charlotte Checkers	AHL	9	6	4	10	2	5	0	0	0	2
2017–18	Charlotte Checkers	AHL	69	25	18	43	8	8	2	1	3	2
2018–19	Charlotte Checkers	AHL	69	30	24	54	12	17	7	8	15	4
2018–19	Carolina Hurricanes	NHL	—	—	—	—	—	1	0	0	0	0
2019–20	Rockford IceHogs	AHL	5	0	1	1	0	—	—	—	—	—
2019–20	Springfield Thunderbirds	AHL	43	12	19	31	12	—	—	—	—	—
2019–20	Florida Panthers	NHL	9	2	2	4	0	1	0	0	0	0
2020–21	Lukko	Liiga	43	23	14	37	22	11	4	4	8	4
2021–22	SCL Tigers	NL	31	10	12	22	6	—	—	—	—	—
2022–23	SCL Tigers	NL	48	24	15	39	10	—	—	—	—	—
2023–24	SCL Tigers	NL	50	18	23	41	8	—	—	—	—	—
Liiga totals			209	65	49	114	66	13	4	4	8	4
NHL totals			9	2	2	4	0	2	0	0	0	0

Medal record

Representing Finland

Ice hockey

World Junior Championships
Gold medal – first place	2016 Finland	

IIHF World U18 Championships
Silver medal – second place	2015 Switzerland	

=== International ===
Year	Team	Event	Result	GP	G	A	Pts	PIM
2013	Finland	U17	7th	5	2	2	4	2
2014	Finland	WJC18	6th	2	1	0	1	0
2015	Finland	WJC18	2nd place, silver medalist(s)	7	3	5	8	6
2016	Finland	WJC	1st place, gold medalist(s)	7	4	3	7	4
Junior totals				21	10	10	20	12

== Awards and honors ==
Award	Year
AHL
Calder Cup (Charlotte Checkers)	2019
