= Sami Niku =

Finnish ice hockey player (born 1996)

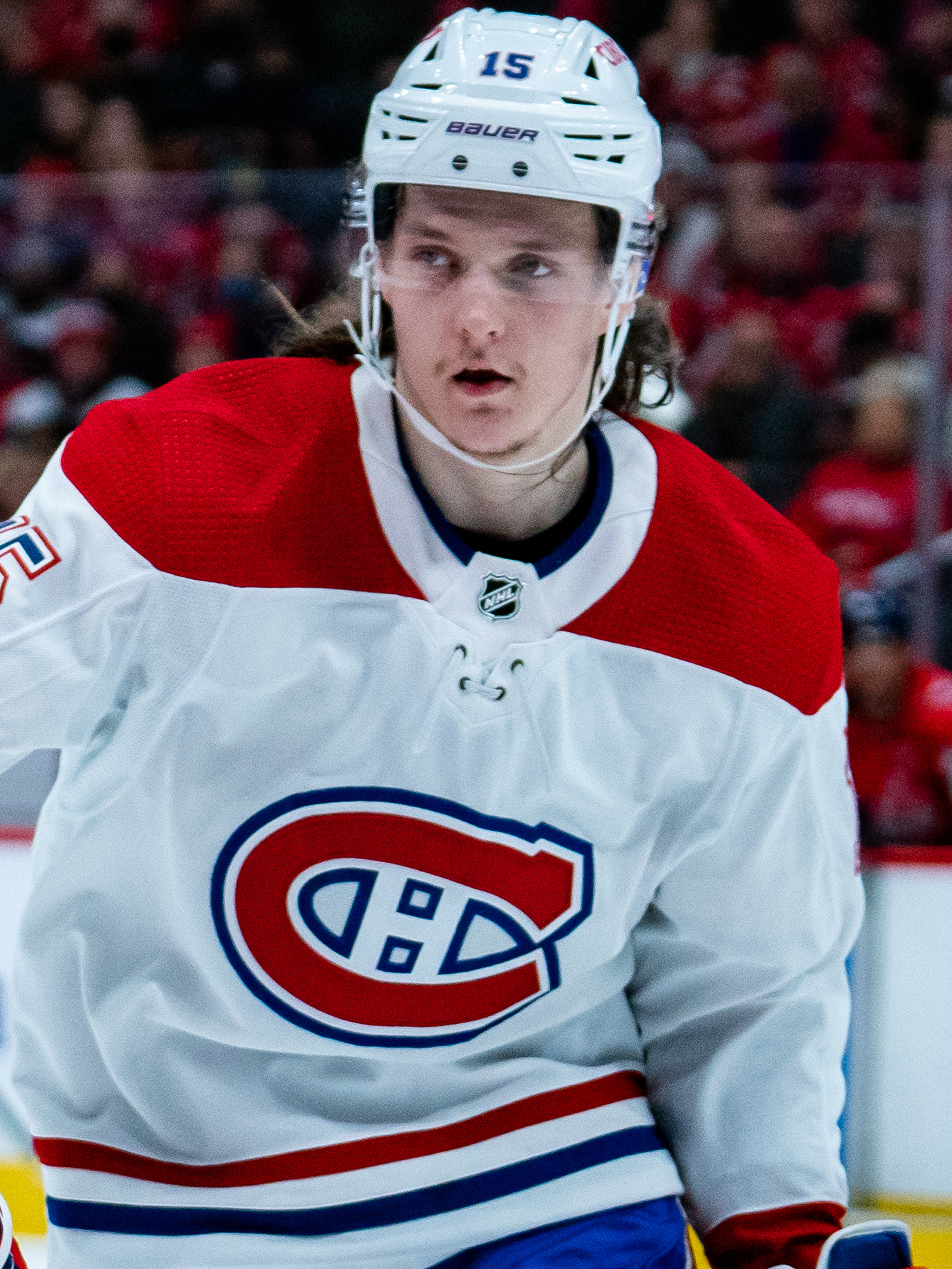
- Niku with the Montreal Canadiens in 2021
- Born: 10 October 1996 (age 29) Haapavesi, Finland
- Height: 6 ft 0 in (183 cm)
- Weight: 176 lb (80 kg; 12 st 8 lb)
- Position: Defence
- Shoots: Left
- NL team Former teams: Lausanne HC; JYP Jyväskylä; Winnipeg Jets; Montreal Canadiens; Ilves Tampere; EHC Kloten
- NHL draft: 198th overall, 2015; Winnipeg Jets
- Playing career: 2013–present

Sami Niku (born 10 October 1996) is a Finnish professional ice hockey defenceman currently playing with Lausanne HC of the National League (NL). He was selected in the seventh round, 198th overall, by the Winnipeg Jets of the National Hockey League (NHL) in the 2015 NHL entry draft.

== Playing career ==
Niku made his Liiga debut playing with JYP Jyväskylä during the 2014–15 Liiga season.

Following the 2016–17 season with JYP, having played his first full season in the Liiga in posting 27 points in 59 games, Niku agreed to a three-year, entry-level contract with the Winnipeg Jets on May 15, 2017. He played most of the 2017–18 season with the Manitoba Moose, the Jets' American Hockey League (AHL) affiliate. He was called up by the Jets on April 1, 2018, and scored his first goal in his NHL debut in a Jets' win over the Montreal Canadiens on April 3. At conclusion of the 2017–18 regular season, Niku was voted as the AHL's top defenseman, as well as earning AHL First All-Star team and the AHL All-Rookie honours.

On 21 September 2021, Niku was bought out of his contract with the Jets. Three days later, he signed a one-year contract with the Montreal Canadiens. A week later, in his first pre-season game with the team, Niku sustained a concussion after being hit from behind by Ottawa Senators player Josh Norris and was ruled out indefinitely.

As a free agent from the Canadiens, Niku opted to return to Finland agreeing to re-join original club, JYP Jyväskylä of the Liiga, on a one-year contract for the 2022–23 season on 29 July 2022.

For the 2024–25 season, Niku signed a one-year contract with the Swiss club EHC Kloten of the NL.

On April 30, 2025, Niku signed a two-year contract with the Lausanne HC, remaining in the NL.

== International play ==
Medal record

Representing Finland

Ice hockey

IIHF World U20 Championship
Gold medal – first place	2016 Finland	

Internationally, Niku played in the 2014 IIHF World U18 Championships, the 2015 World Junior Ice Hockey Championships, and the 2016 World Junior Ice Hockey Championships.

== Career statistics ==
=== Regular season and playoffs ===
			Regular season					Playoffs
Season	Team	League	GP	G	A	Pts	PIM	GP	G	A	Pts	PIM
2011–12	JYP	FIN U18	17	1	1	2	0	—	—	—	—	—
2012–13	JYP	FIN U18	3	2	1	3	0	—	—	—	—	—
2012–13	JYP	FIN U20	30	0	8	8	22	6	0	0	0	2
2013–14	JYP	FIN U18	1	0	3	3	0	—	—	—	—	—
2013–14	JYP	FIN U20	20	4	10	14	20	—	—	—	—	—
2013–14	JYP–Akatemia	Mestis	30	0	3	3	16	—	—	—	—	—
2014–15	JYP–Akatemia	Mestis	39	3	22	25	24	6	0	5	5	4
2014–15	JYP	Liiga	12	0	1	1	6	—	—	—	—	—
2015–16	JYP	Liiga	38	4	7	11	2	—	—	—	—	—
2015–16	JYP–Akatemia	Mestis	7	0	2	2	4	—	—	—	—	—
2016–17	JYP	Liiga	59	5	22	27	26	15	1	5	6	2
2017–18	Manitoba Moose	AHL	76	16	38	54	30	9	1	2	3	2
2017–18	Winnipeg Jets	NHL	1	1	0	1	0	—	—	—	—	—
2018–19	Manitoba Moose	AHL	20	3	9	12	14	—	—	—	—	—
2018–19	Winnipeg Jets	NHL	30	1	3	4	2	—	—	—	—	—
2019–20	Manitoba Moose	AHL	18	3	11	14	12	—	—	—	—	—
2019–20	Winnipeg Jets	NHL	17	0	5	5	12	—	—	—	—	—
2020–21	Winnipeg Jets	NHL	6	0	0	0	8	—	—	—	—	—
2021–22	Montreal Canadiens	NHL	13	0	6	6	2	—	—	—	—	—
2021–22	Laval Rocket	AHL	36	2	11	13	14	15	0	11	11	10
2022–23	JYP	Liiga	54	9	33	42	26	—	—	—	—	—
2023–24	JYP	Liiga	37	11	26	37	24	—	—	—	—	—
2023–24	Ilves	Liiga	16	1	11	12	4	5	0	1	1	2
2024–25	EHC Kloten	NL	52	5	25	30	32	9	0	1	1	4
2025–26	Lausanne HC	NL	50	8	16	24	22	6	0	3	3	0
Liiga totals			216	30	100	130	88	20	1	6	7	4
NHL totals			67	2	14	16	24	—	—	—	—	—

=== International ===
Year	Team	Event	Result	GP	G	A	Pts	PIM
2013	Finland	U17	7th	5	1	1	2	4
2013	Finland	IH18	5th	4	1	1	2	4
2014	Finland	WJC18	6th	5	1	0	1	0
2015	Finland	WJC	7th	5	0	0	0	0
2016	Finland	WJC	1st place, gold medalist(s)	8	1	2	3	6
Junior totals				27	4	4	8	14

== Awards and honors ==
Award	Year
AHL
Eddie Shore Award for Top Defensemen	2018
First All-Star team	2018
All-Rookie Team	2018
