= Adam Ollas Mattsson =

Swedish ice hockey player

- Born: July 30, 1996 (age 29) Stockholm, Sweden
- Height: 6 ft 4 in (193 cm)
- Weight: 216 lb (98 kg; 15 st 6 lb)
- Position: Defence
- Shoots: Left
- SHL team Former teams: Färjestad BK; Djurgårdens IF; Malmö Redhawks
- NHL draft: 175th overall, 2014; Calgary Flames
- Playing career: 2013–present

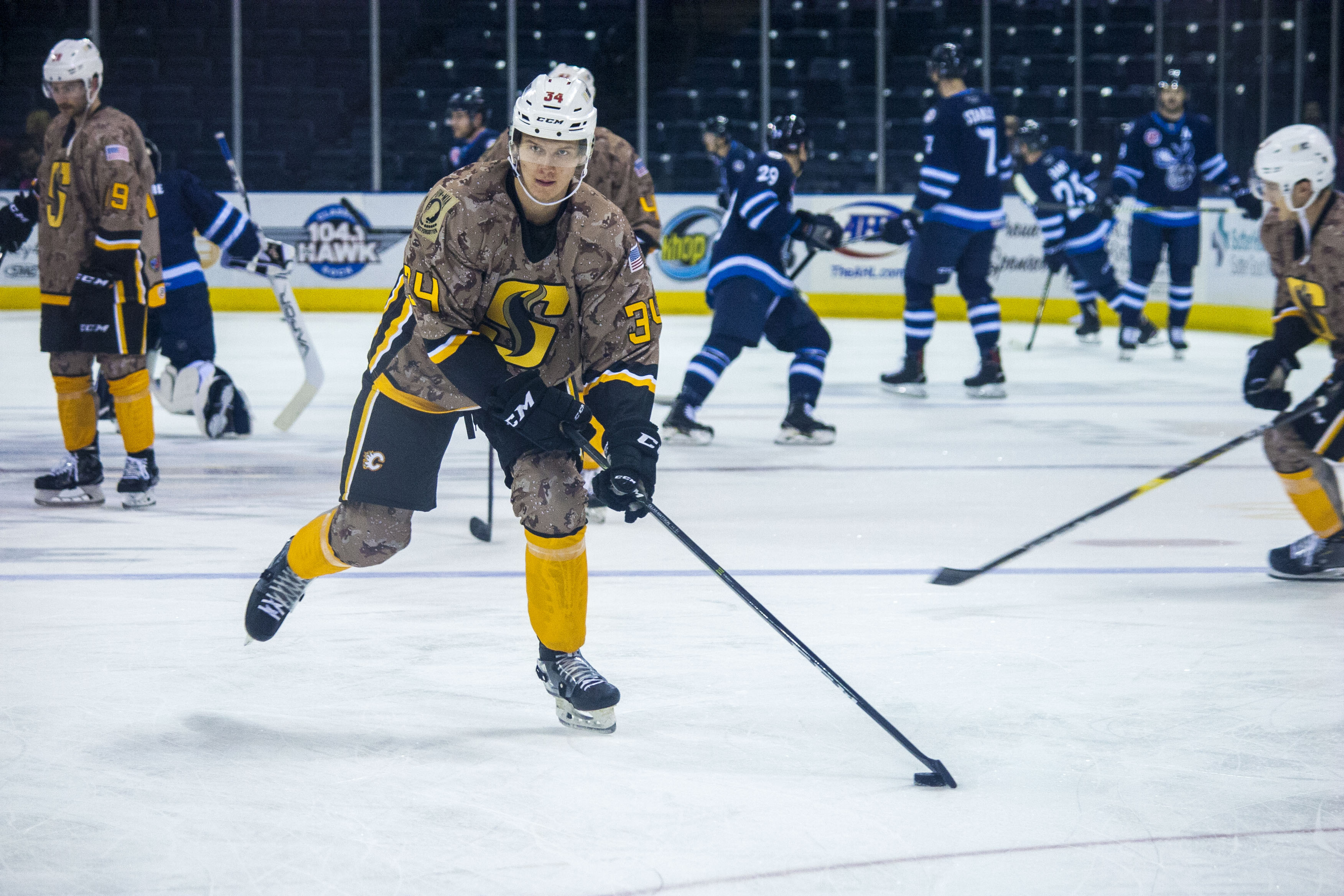
Adam Ollas Mattsson

Adam Ollas-Mattsson (born July 30, 1996) is a Swedish professional ice hockey defenseman. He is currently playing with Färjestad BK in the Swedish Hockey League (SHL).

== Playing career ==
Ollas Mattsson played youth hockey with Djurgårdens IF and made his senior debut during the 2013–14 season in the Allsvenskan. Ollas Mattsson was selected by the Calgary Flames in the sixth round (175th overall) of the 2014 NHL entry draft.

At the conclusion of 2016–17 season, his third season within the Swedish Hockey League (SHL) with Djurgårdens IF, Ollas Mattsson pursued his ambition for an NHL contract in agreeing to an amateur try-out contract to close out the year with the Stockton Heat of the American Hockey League, the primary affiliate of draft club, the Calgary Flames, on March 21, 2017.

Ollas Mattsson played two full seasons with the Stockton Heat, appearing in a career high 65 games for 6 goals and 18 points in the 2018–19 season. Unable to garner an NHL contract from the Flames, Ollas Mattsson opted to return to the SHL in Sweden as a free agent, signing a two-year contract with the Malmö Redhawks on 28 May 2019.

== Career statistics ==
=== Regular season and playoffs ===
| | | | Regular season | | | | | Playoffs |
| Season | Team | League | GP | G | A | Pts | PIM | GP | G | A | Pts | PIM |
|---|---|---|---|---|---|---|---|---|---|---|---|---|
| 2013–14 | Djurgårdens IF | J20 | 33 | 1 | 8 | 9 | 42 | 4 | 0 | 2 | 2 | 2 |
| 2013–14 | Djurgårdens IF | Allsv | 6 | 0 | 2 | 2 | 4 | — | — | — | — | — |
| 2014–15 | Djurgårdens IF | J20 | 19 | 1 | 6 | 7 | 42 | 7 | 0 | 2 | 2 | 29 |
| 2014–15 | Djurgårdens IF | SHL | 34 | 0 | 2 | 2 | 4 | 1 | 0 | 0 | 0 | 0 |
| 2015–16 | Djurgårdens IF | SHL | 22 | 1 | 3 | 4 | 2 | 1 | 0 | 0 | 0 | 0 |
| 2015–16 | Djurgårdens IF | J20 | — | — | — | — | — | 3 | 0 | 3 | 3 | 0 |
| 2016–17 | Djurgårdens IF | SHL | 52 | 1 | 3 | 4 | 29 | 3 | 0 | 0 | 0 | 0 |
| 2016–17 | Stockton Heat | AHL | 9 | 1 | 1 | 2 | 6 | — | — | — | — | — |
| 2017–18 | Stockton Heat | AHL | 14 | 0 | 0 | 0 | 6 | — | — | — | — | — |
| 2018–19 | Stockton Heat | AHL | 65 | 6 | 12 | 18 | 28 | — | — | — | — | — |
| 2019–20 | Malmö Redhawks | SHL | 49 | 2 | 10 | 12 | 63 | — | — | — | — | — |
| 2020–21 | Malmö Redhawks | SHL | 50 | 1 | 7 | 8 | 20 | 2 | 0 | 1 | 1 | 0 |
| 2021–22 | Malmö Redhawks | SHL | 52 | 3 | 12 | 15 | 16 | — | — | — | — | — |
| 2022–23 | Malmö Redhawks | SHL | 51 | 5 | 11 | 16 | 14 | — | — | — | — | — |
| 2023–24 | Malmö Redhawks | SHL | 49 | 6 | 15 | 21 | 14 | — | — | — | — | — |
| 2024–25 | Färjestad BK | SHL | 50 | 3 | 11 | 14 | 16 | 6 | 0 | 0 | 0 | 4 |
| SHL totals | | | 409 | 22 | 74 | 96 | 178 | 13 | 0 | 1 | 1 | 4 |

=== International ===
| Year | Team | Event | Result | GP | G | A | Pts | PIM |
|---|---|---|---|---|---|---|---|---|
| 2013 | Sweden | U17 | 1st place, gold medalist(s) | 6 | 0 | 3 | 3 | 26 |
| 2013 | Sweden | IH18 | 7th | 4 | 0 | 0 | 0 | 2 |
| 2014 | Sweden | WJC18 | 4th | 7 | 1 | 2 | 3 | 4 |
| 2016 | Sweden | WJC | 4th | 5 | 1 | 1 | 2 | 6 |
| Junior totals | | | | 22 | 2 | 6 | 8 | 38 |
