= Andrei Svetlakov =

Russian ice hockey player

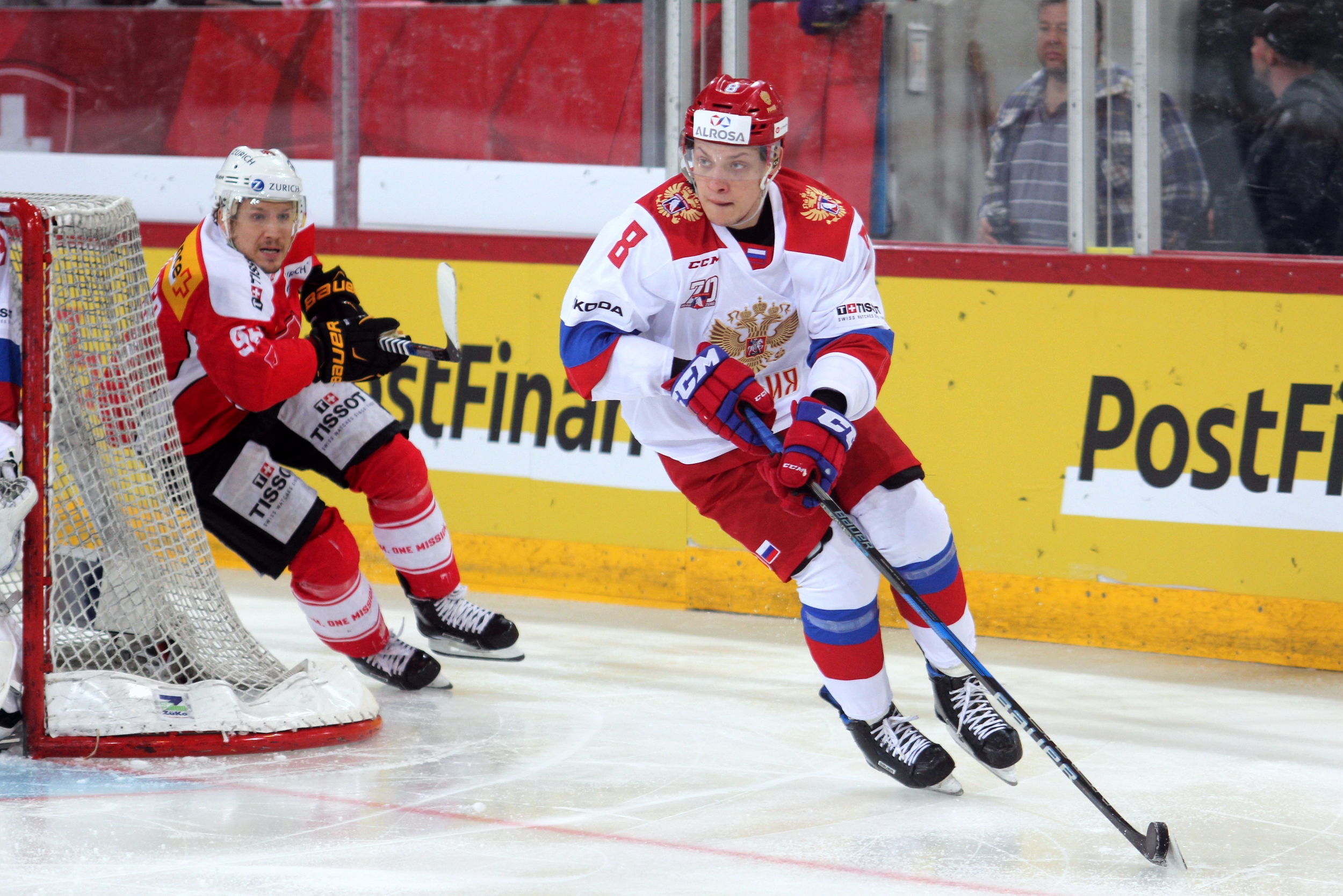
- Svetlakov with Russia in 2017
- Born: 6 April 1996 (age 30) Moscow, Russia
- Height: 6 ft 0 in (183 cm)
- Weight: 201 lb (91 kg; 14 st 5 lb)
- Position: Centre
- Shoots: Left
- KHL team Former teams: Traktor Chelyabinsk; CSKA Moscow
- NHL draft: 178th overall, 2017; Minnesota Wild
- Playing career: 2015–present

Andrei Pavlovich Svetlakov (Russian: Андрей Павлович Светлаков; born 6 April 1996) is a Russian ice hockey forward currently playing for Traktor Chelyabinsk in the Kontinental Hockey League (KHL). He was drafted 178th overall by the Minnesota Wild in the 2017 NHL entry draft.

== Playing career ==
Svetlakov began his junior career at just 16 years old, playing in the Junior Hockey League (MHL), Russia's top junior league, where he suited up for Krasnaya Armiya. His strong performances in the MHL earned him a call-up to the Kontinental Hockey League (KHL), and he made his professional debut with HC CSKA Moscow during the 2015–16 KHL season.

Throughout the 2022–23 season, Svetlakov showcased his offensive talents by achieving career-high statistics while playing for CSKA Moscow. On February 23, 2023, the Wild, who held his NHL rights, traded those rights to the Boston Bruins. This transaction was part of a complex three-team trade involving the Wild, the Bruins, and the Washington Capitals.

After finishing the 2023–24 season, marking his ninth year in the KHL and winning three Gagarin Cup titles with CSKA Moscow, Svetlakov departed the team as a free agent. On 7 May 2024, he signed a three-year deal with another KHL club, Traktor Chelyabinsk.

== International play ==
Medal record

Ice hockey

Representing Russia

World Junior Championships
Silver medal – second place	2016 Finland	

In the 2016 World Junior Ice Hockey Championships final, he netted two goals, including a dramatic equalizer with only six seconds remaining in regulation time. Despite his efforts, Russia was defeated in overtime, finishing with the silver medal. For his performance, Svetlakov was named the best player of the game.

== Career statistics ==
=== Regular season and playoffs ===
			Regular season					Playoffs
Season	Team	League	GP	G	A	Pts	PIM	GP	G	A	Pts	PIM
2012–13	Krasnaya Armiya	MHL	33	1	3	4	10	—	—	—	—	—
2013–14	Krasnaya Armiya	MHL	35	4	4	8	18	8	0	0	0	2
2014–15	Krasnaya Armiya	MHL	49	18	34	52	92	10	5	6	11	10
2015–16	Krasnaya Armiya	MHL	1	0	0	0	2	—	—	—	—	—
2015–16	CSKA Moscow	KHL	30	7	3	10	14	8	0	2	2	6
2015–16	Zvezda Chekhov	VHL	5	1	1	2	8	—	—	—	—	—
2016–17	CSKA Moscow	KHL	37	4	12	16	42	10	3	0	3	18
2016–17	Zvezda Chekhov	VHL	2	1	1	2	6	—	—	—	—	—
2017–18	CSKA Moscow	KHL	37	7	10	17	44	12	1	1	2	16
2017–18	Zvezda Chekhov	VHL	8	2	6	8	8	—	—	—	—	—
2018–19	CSKA Moscow	KHL	44	8	7	15	25	18	2	6	8	8
2018–19	Zvezda Chekhov	VHL	2	2	1	3	0	—	—	—	—	—
2019–20	CSKA Moscow	KHL	41	5	12	17	24	3	0	0	0	2
2020–21	CSKA Moscow	KHL	48	7	13	20	48	23	1	3	4	12
2021–22	CSKA Moscow	KHL	28	3	4	7	18	22	4	5	9	18
2021–22	Zvezda Chekhov	VHL	3	3	2	5	0	—	—	—	—	—
2022–23	CSKA Moscow	KHL	68	11	16	27	32	24	3	7	10	16
2023–24	CSKA Moscow	KHL	59	10	19	29	36	5	0	1	1	6
2024–25	Traktor Chelyabinsk	KHL	66	17	22	39	38	20	3	6	9	2
2025–26	Traktor Chelyabinsk	KHL	59	20	19	39	37	5	0	2	2	2
KHL totals			517	99	137	236	358	150	17	33	50	106

=== International ===
Year	Team	Event	Result	GP	G	A	Pts	PIM
2013	Russia	U17	2nd place, silver medalist(s)	6	0	2	2	12
2016	Russia	WJC	2nd place, silver medalist(s)	7	3	1	4	6
Junior totals				13	3	3	6	18

== Awards and honors ==
Award	Year
KHL
Gagarin Cup (CSKA Moscow)	2019, 2022, 2023
