= Yegor Korshkov =

Russian ice hockey player

- Born: 10 July 1996 (age 30) Novosibirsk, Russia
- Height: 6 ft 4 in (193 cm)
- Weight: 214 lb (97 kg; 15 st 4 lb)
- Position: Right wing
- Shoots: Left
- KHL team Former teams: Sibir Novosibirsk; Lokomotiv Yaroslavl; Toronto Maple Leafs; Amur Khabarovsk; Ak Bars Kazan; Traktor Chelyabinsk
- NHL draft: 31st overall, 2016; Toronto Maple Leafs
- Playing career: 2014–present

Yegor Alexeyevich Korshkov (Russian: Егор Алексеевич Коршков; born 10 July 1996) is a Russian professional ice hockey forward who is currently playing for Sibir Novosibirsk in the Kontinental Hockey League (KHL). His rights are held by the Florida Panthers of the National Hockey League (NHL).

== Playing career ==
Korshkov made his Kontinental Hockey League debut playing with Lokomotiv Yaroslavl during the 2014–15 KHL season.

In the 2016 NHL entry draft Korshkov was chosen 31st overall by the Toronto Maple Leafs, the highest the team had ever selected a Russian player. Korshkov was scouted out by Evgeny Namestnikov, the same scout who tipped the Leafs off on Nikita Soshnikov a year earlier.

In the 2018–19 season, Korshkov recorded 3 goals and 5 points through 19 games before collecting 3 assists in 9 playoff games. On 1 May 2019, Korshkov signed a two-year, entry-level contract with the Maple Leafs, immediately joining AHL affiliate the Toronto Marlies during their playoff run.

During the 2019–20 season, Korshkov continued in the AHL with the Marlies before he was recalled by the Maple Leafs to make his NHL debut, and subsequently scored his first NHL goal on 16 February 2020 in a game against the Buffalo Sabres.

On 15 February 2021, Korshkov rights were traded along with David Warsofsky to the Carolina Hurricanes in exchange for Alex Galchenyuk. Following the completion of the 2021–22 season with Lokomotiv, suffering a first-round defeat in the playoffs to CSKA Moscow, Korshokv's NHL rights were again traded, dealt by the Hurricanes in a three-team trade to the Florida Panthers on 21 March 2022.

Following the completion of his eighth season with Lokomotiv Yaroslavl in 2022–23, Korshkov, with a year remaining on his contract, was traded to fellow KHL club, Amur Khabarovsk, in exchange for financial compensation on 16 May 2023.

After posting offensive career highs with Amur Khabarovsk during the 2023–24 season, Korshkov left the club as a free agent and joined fellow Russian outfit, Ak Bars Kazan, on a two-year contract on 1 May 2024.

== Career statistics ==
=== Regular season and playoffs ===
			Regular season					Playoffs
Season	Team	League	GP	G	A	Pts	PIM	GP	G	A	Pts	PIM
2013–14	Loko Yaroslavl	MHL	43	12	10	22	22	7	0	1	1	6
2014–15	Lokomotiv Yaroslavl	KHL	24	1	2	3	4	—	—	—	—	—
2014–15	Loko Yaroslavl	MHL	23	13	15	28	18	14	5	8	13	10
2015–16	Lokomotiv Yaroslavl	KHL	41	6	6	12	23	4	0	0	0	0
2015–16	Loko Yaroslavl	MHL	4	2	4	6	6	15	9	10	19	10
2016–17	Lokomotiv Yaroslavl	KHL	36	6	13	19	24	15	1	2	3	10
2016–17	Loko Yaroslavl	MHL	2	0	0	0	4	—	—	—	—	—
2017–18	Lokomotiv Yaroslavl	KHL	52	8	18	26	45	9	1	1	2	16
2018–19	Lokomotiv Yaroslavl	KHL	19	3	2	5	6	9	0	3	3	4
2018–19	Toronto Marlies	AHL	—	—	—	—	—	9	1	0	1	4
2019–20	Toronto Marlies	AHL	44	16	9	25	22	—	—	—	—	—
2019–20	Toronto Maple Leafs	NHL	1	1	0	1	0	—	—	—	—	—
2020–21	Lokomotiv Yaroslavl	KHL	59	17	17	34	26	11	3	6	9	0
2021–22	Lokomotiv Yaroslavl	KHL	44	11	11	22	18	4	1	0	1	4
2022–23	Lokomotiv Yaroslavl	KHL	40	4	8	12	35	7	0	1	1	2
2023–24	Amur Khabarovsk	KHL	67	15	29	44	32	6	2	1	3	0
2024–25	Ak Bars Kazan	KHL	60	8	15	23	18	5	0	1	1	0
2025–26	Traktor Chelyabinsk	KHL	68	16	21	37	18	5	0	0	0	2
KHL totals			510	95	142	237	249	75	8	15	23	38
NHL totals			1	1	0	1	0	—	—	—	—	—

=== International ===
Year	Team	Event	Result	GP	G	A	Pts	PIM
2014	Russia	WJC18	5th	5	1	0	1	4
2016	Russia	WJC	2nd place, silver medalist(s)	7	2	6	8	16
Junior totals				12	3	6	9	20
