= Olli Juolevi =

Finnish ice hockey player (born 1998)

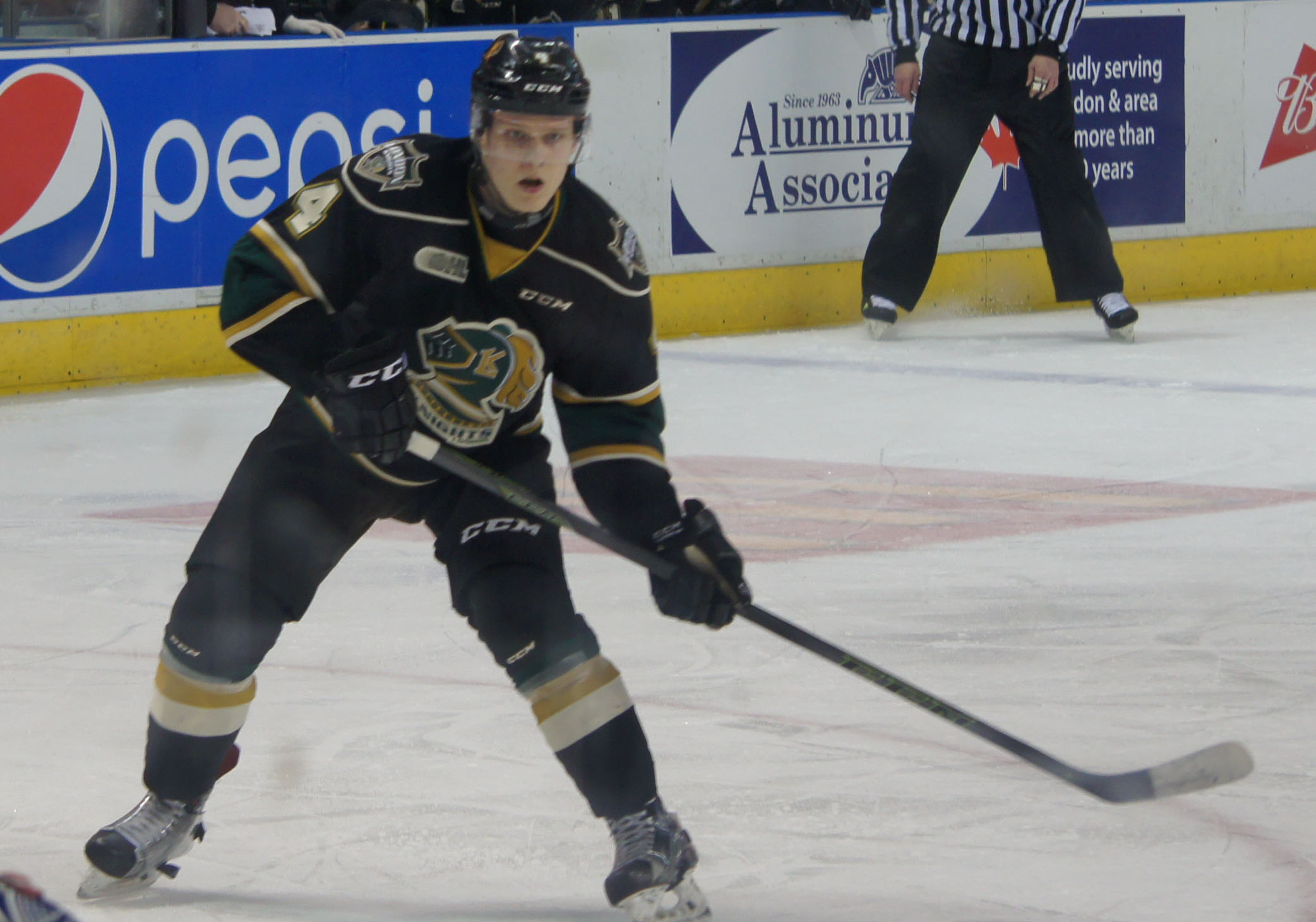
- Juolevi with the London Knights in 2016
- Born: 5 May 1998 (age 28) Helsinki, Finland
- Height: 6 ft 2 in (188 cm)
- Weight: 182 lb (83 kg; 13 st 0 lb)
- Position: Defence
- Shoots: Left
- SM-liiga team Former teams: Jokerit; TPS; Vancouver Canucks; Florida Panthers; Detroit Red Wings; Timrå IK; Tappara
- NHL draft: 5th overall, 2016; Vancouver Canucks
- Playing career: 2017–present

Olli Juolevi (Finnish pronunciation: [ˈolːi ˈjuo̯leʋi]; born 5 May 1998) is a Finnish professional ice hockey defenceman who plays with Jokerit in the Liiga. He was selected fifth overall by the Vancouver Canucks in the 2016 NHL entry draft. Born and raised in Finland, Juolevi developed in the Jokerit program before he moved to North America to play major junior hockey with the Ontario Hockey League (OHL)'s London Knights in 2015. After one season with London, he was drafted by the Canucks.

Internationally, Juolevi has represented Finland in three World Junior Championships, winning gold at the 2016 tournament.

== Playing career ==
At age 14, Juolevi began playing junior hockey in Finland for Jokerit's U16 team in 2012–13. By the following year, he was playing for Jokerit's U20 team in the Jr. A SM-liiga. After scoring 32 points (6 goals and 26 assists) in 44 games, he was named to the league's First All-Star Team and awarded Rookie of the Year. During the off-season, Juolevi was selected 45th overall by the London Knights of the Ontario Hockey League (OHL) at the 2015 Canadian Hockey League Import Draft. Juolevi committed to the Knights shortly thereafter, leaving his junior career in Finland.

With 42 points (9 goals and 33 assists) in 57 games, Juolevi ranked third among OHL rookie defencemen and 13th among defencemen overall in 2015–16. He was named to the OHL Third All-Star Team and Second All-Rookie Team. During the 2016 OHL playoffs, he added 14 points (3 goals and 11 assists) in 18 games, ranking second among all defencemen, as the Knights won the J. Ross Robertson Cup as OHL champions. With the Knights advancing to the 2016 Memorial Cup, Juolevi recorded seven assists in four games and was named to the tournament's All-Star Team, helping London to a national championship.

Having played a key role in London's championship season, Juolevi was highly regarded by scouts. NHL Central Scouting ranked him fifth among draft-eligible players competing in North America, praising his offensive play. During the 2016 NHL entry draft, he was the first defenceman selected, fifth overall by the Vancouver Canucks. On 5 August 2016, Juolevi signed his first professional contract in agreeing to a three-year, entry-level contract with the Canucks.

Juolevi was assigned to Vancouver's AHL affiliate, the Utica Comets, to start the 2018–19 season. After registering 13 points in 18 games in his first AHL season, Juolevi was sidelined for the remainder of the year due to knee surgery.

Following his injury-shortened season, Juolevi was again sent to Utica to start for the 2019–20 season. After 5 points in 14 games, Juolevi again suffered an injury in November 2019, though he returned three weeks later. Juolevi would play in 45 games with Utica, scoring 25 points, before the 2019–20 AHL season was suspended and later cancelled due to the COVID-19 pandemic.

Juolevi made his NHL debut with the Canucks during the 2020 Stanley Cup playoffs, playing in the fourth and final game of Vancouver's Qualifying Round series against the Minnesota Wild. He played 6:16 in the game, which Vancouver won 5–4 in overtime to eliminate Minnesota and move onto the First Round.

The following season, Juolevi earned a spot on Vancouver's roster out of training camp for the first time in his career. He scored his first career goal on 25 January 2021 in a 7–1 win over the Ottawa Senators.

On 10 October 2021, Juolevi was traded to the Florida Panthers in exchange for Noah Juulsen and Juho Lammikko. He began the 2021–22 season on the Panthers roster, adding depth to the blueline in remaining as a healthy scratch. Yet to feature with the Panthers, he was assigned on a conditioning stint to AHL affiliate, the Charlotte Checkers, before returning to the Panthers and making his debut against the Arizona Coyotes on 10 December 2021. He went scoreless over 10 games before on 5 March 2022, Juolevi was placed on waivers by the Panthers. The following day, Juolevi's tenure with the Panthers ended after he was claimed by the Detroit Red Wings.

On July 27, 2022, Juolevi signed a one-year, two-way contract with the Anaheim Ducks. In the 2022–23 season, Juolevi did not feature in a contest with the Ducks, playing exclusively with AHL affiliate the San Diego Gulls and posting 1 goal and 14 points through just 38 regular season appearances.

As a free agent at the conclusion of his contract with the Ducks, Juolevi opted to leave North America and return to Europe in signing a one-month contract with Timrå IK of the Swedish Hockey League (SHL) on 5 October 2023. In beginning the 2023–24 season in the SHL, Juolevi registered 1 goal through 9 appearances, before concluding his short-term contract with Timrå IK. On 13 November 2023, Juolevi marked his return to the Finnish Liiga, in securing a contract with eventual champions, Tappara. Juolevi's role grew in the post-season, notching 2 goals and 6 points through 16 appearances in contributing to claiming the Finnish title.

== International play ==
Medal record

Representing Finland

Men's ice hockey

IIHF World U20 Championship
Gold medal – first place	2016 Finland	

Juolevi played for Finland at the 2016 World Junior Championships, where they won gold on 5 January 2016. In recognition of his play, he was named to the tournament All-star team.

Juolevi was named Finland's captain for the 2017 World Junior Championships. In the tournament, Finland was unable to match their success from the previous year, placing ninth and defeating Team Latvia to avoid relegation.

== Career statistics ==
=== Regular season and playoffs ===
			Regular season					Playoffs
Season	Team	League	GP	G	A	Pts	PIM	GP	G	A	Pts	PIM
2013–14	Jokerit	Jr. A	11	1	3	4	0	—	—	—	—	—
2014–15	Jokerit	Jr. A	44	6	26	32	28	5	1	2	3	2
2015–16	London Knights	OHL	57	9	33	42	16	18	3	11	14	4
2016–17	London Knights	OHL	58	10	32	42	36	14	3	5	8	8
2017–18	TPS	Liiga	38	7	12	19	14	11	2	5	7	0
2018–19	Utica Comets	AHL	18	1	12	13	2	—	—	—	—	—
2019–20	Utica Comets	AHL	45	2	23	25	24	—	—	—	—	—
2019–20	Vancouver Canucks	NHL	—	—	—	—	—	1	0	0	0	0
2020–21	Vancouver Canucks	NHL	23	2	1	3	0	—	—	—	—	—
2021–22	Charlotte Checkers	AHL	3	0	1	1	2	—	—	—	—	—
2021–22	Florida Panthers	NHL	10	0	0	0	2	—	—	—	—	—
2021–22	Detroit Red Wings	NHL	8	0	0	0	4	—	—	—	—	—
2022–23	San Diego Gulls	AHL	38	1	13	14	22	—	—	—	—	—
2023–24	Timrå IK	SHL	9	1	0	1	0	—	—	—	—	—
2023–24	Tappara	Liiga	40	2	4	6	6	16	2	4	6	8
Liiga totals			78	9	16	25	20	27	4	9	13	8
NHL totals			41	2	1	3	6	1	0	0	0	0

=== International ===
Year	Team	Event	Result	GP	G	A	Pts	PIM
2014	Finland	IH18	5th	4	0	1	1	4
2016	Finland	WJC	1st place, gold medalist(s)	7	0	9	9	4
2017	Finland	WJC	9th	6	0	2	2	0
2018	Finland	WJC	6th	5	1	3	4	0
Junior totals				22	1	15	16	8

== Awards and honors ==
Award	Year
International
IIHF World U20 Championship Gold Medal	2016
IIHF World U20 Championship All-Star Team	2016

Awards and achievements
Preceded by Brock Boeser	Vancouver Canucks first-round draft pick 2016	Succeeded by Elias Pettersson
