= Gabriel Carlsson =

Swedish ice hockey player (born 1997)

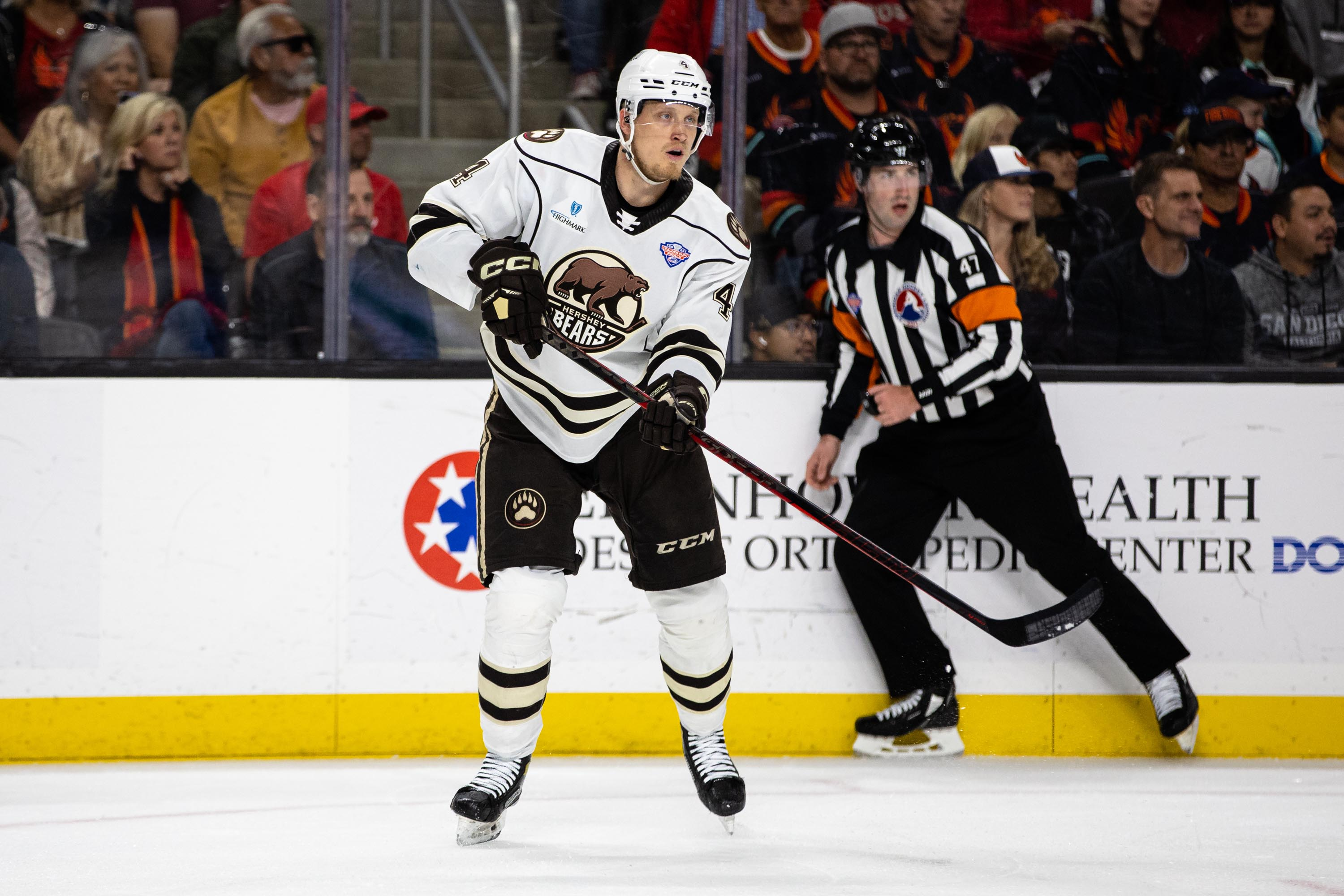
- Carlsson with the Hershey Bears in 2023
- Born: 2 January 1997 (age 29) Örebro, Sweden
- Height: 6 ft 4 in (193 cm)
- Weight: 195 lb (88 kg; 13 st 13 lb)
- Position: Defence
- Shoots: Left
- SHL team Former teams: Färjestad BK; Linköpings HC; Columbus Blue Jackets; Washington Capitals; Växjö Lakers; EV Zug
- NHL draft: 29th overall, 2015; Columbus Blue Jackets
- Playing career: 2014–present

Gabriel Carlsson (born 2 January 1997) is a Swedish professional ice hockey defenseman for Färjestad BK of the Swedish Hockey League (SHL).

He was considered one of the top ten international skaters for the 2015 NHL entry draft according to the NHL Central Scouting Bureau before he was selected 29th overall by the Columbus Blue Jackets.

== Playing career ==
Carlsson came through the youth ranks of Örebro HK, before joining the Linköpings HC youth system in 2013. He made his Swedish Hockey League (SHL) debut with Linköping's men's squad during the 2014–15 season. After appearing in 10 post-season games, Carlsson was signed to a two-year contract extension to remain with Linköping on 17 April 2015. He made 45 appearances in the 2015–16 season with one goal and eight assists. Carlsson also competed in six playoff contests with Linköping that year.

The Columbus Blue Jackets, who picked Carlsson in the 2015 NHL entry draft, announced on 19 April 2016 that he has signed a three-year entry-level contract with the franchise. He made his NHL debut at the end of the 2016–17 season and played in five Stanley Cup playoff games. On 15 October 2017, Carlsson was injured during a game against the New York Rangers and was subsequently placed on injured reserve.

Carlsson started the 2018–19 season with the Blue Jackets in the NHL, but was reassigned to the Cleveland Monsters on 10 October.

After six years within the Blue Jackets organization, Carlsson left as a free agent and was signed to a one-year, two-way contract with the Washington Capitals for the 2022–23 season on 20 July 2022. Carlsson contributed with 2 assists through 6 appearances with the Capitals, playing the majority of the season with AHL affiliate, the Hershey Bears, and helping the club capture the Calder Cup.

Leaving the Capitals at the conclusion of his contract, Carlsson returned to his native Sweden in signing a three-year contract with the Växjö Lakers of the SHL on 28 July 2023.

After only 1 season with the Swedish club, Calrsson made use of the opt-out clause of his contract to sign a two-year contract with EV Zug of the Swiss National League (NL).

The following season, EV Zug terminated his contract. Calrsson returned to Sweden, signing a three-year contract with Färjestad BK.

== Career statistics ==
=== Regular season and playoffs ===
			Regular season					Playoffs
Season	Team	League	GP	G	A	Pts	PIM	GP	G	A	Pts	PIM
2012–13	Örebro HK	J18	16	1	5	6	4	—	—	—	—	—
2013–14	Linköpings HC	J18	22	2	12	14	8	—	—	—	—	—
2013–14	Linköpings HC	J18 Allsv	18	2	3	5	6	5	0	0	0	4
2014–15	Linköpings HC	J18	3	2	0	2	0	—	—	—	—	—
2014–15	Linköpings HC	J18 Allsv	4	0	3	3	2	—	—	—	—	—
2014–15	Linköpings HC	J20	39	0	7	7	14	3	0	2	2	2
2014–15	Linköpings HC	SHL	7	0	2	2	0	10	0	1	1	2
2015–16	Linköpings HC	J20	11	2	6	8	8	1	0	0	0	0
2015–16	Linköpings HC	SHL	45	1	8	9	2	6	0	0	0	0
2016–17	Linköpings HC	SHL	40	2	2	4	6	6	0	0	0	0
2016–17	Cleveland Monsters	AHL	3	0	1	1	2	—	—	—	—	—
2016–17	Columbus Blue Jackets	NHL	2	0	1	1	0	5	0	0	0	0
2017–18	Columbus Blue Jackets	NHL	14	0	2	2	4	—	—	—	—	—
2017–18	Cleveland Monsters	AHL	33	2	3	5	14	—	—	—	—	—
2018–19	Columbus Blue Jackets	NHL	1	0	0	0	2	—	—	—	—	—
2018–19	Cleveland Monsters	AHL	67	2	10	12	14	8	0	3	3	2
2019–20	Cleveland Monsters	AHL	41	2	10	12	14	—	—	—	—	—
2019–20	Columbus Blue Jackets	NHL	6	0	0	0	2	—	—	—	—	—
2020–21	Columbus Blue Jackets	NHL	14	1	3	4	4	—	—	—	—	—
2021–22	Cleveland Monsters	AHL	2	0	2	2	0	—	—	—	—	—
2021–22	Columbus Blue Jackets	NHL	38	2	7	9	10	—	—	—	—	—
2022–23	Hershey Bears	AHL	59	1	14	15	44	20	0	2	2	8
2022–23	Washington Capitals	NHL	6	0	2	2	0	—	—	—	—	—
2023–24	Växjö Lakers	SHL	45	8	18	26	20	8	1	2	3	2
2024–25	EV Zug	NL	39	3	8	11	40	4	0	0	0	2
SHL totals			137	11	30	41	28	30	1	3	4	4
NHL totals			81	3	15	18	22	5	0	0	0	0

=== International ===
Year	Team	Event	Result	GP	G	A	Pts	PIM
2014	Sweden	U17	6th	5	0	0	0	2
2014	Sweden	IH18	4th	5	0	1	1	0
2015	Sweden	WJC18	8th	5	0	0	0	2
2016	Sweden	WJC	4th	7	0	3	3	8
2017	Sweden	WJC	4th	6	0	2	2	0
Junior totals				28	0	6	6	12

== Awards and honours ==
Award	Year
AHL
Calder Cup	2023

Awards and achievements
Preceded by Zach Werenski	Columbus Blue Jackets first-round draft pick 2015	Succeeded by Pierre-Luc Dubois
