= Anders Krogsgaard =

- Born: 19 April 1996 (age 29) Esbjerg, Denmark
- Height: 1.85 m (6 ft 1 in)
- Weight: 82 kg (181 lb; 12 st 13 lb)
- Position: Defence
- Shoots: Right
- ICEHL team Former teams: HC TWK Innsbruck; Esbjerg Energy; Esbjerg IK; Aalborg Pirates; Fischtown Pinguins
- National team: Denmark
- Playing career: 2013–present

Anders Krogsgaard (born 19 April 1996) is a Danish ice hockey player for HC TWK Innsbruck in the ICE Hockey League (ICEHL) and the Danish national team.

He represented Denmark at the 2021 IIHF World Championship.
