= Jan Ordoš =

Czech ice hockey player

- Born: September 18, 1996 (age 29) Usti nad Labem, Czech Republic
- Height: 5 ft 11 in (180 cm)
- Weight: 179 lb (81 kg; 12 st 11 lb)
- Position: Forward
- Shoots: Left
- ELH team Former teams: Motor České Budějovice; Bílí Tygři Liberec; IK Oskarshamn
- Playing career: 2014–present

Jan Ordoš (born September 18, 1996) is a Czech professional ice hockey player. He is currently playing for Motor České Budějovice of the Czech Extraliga (ELH).

Ordoš made his Czech Extraliga debut playing with HC Bílí Tygři Liberec during the 2015-16 Czech Extraliga season.
