= Evgeny Namestnikov =

Russian ice hockey player (born 1971)

- Born: October 9, 1971 (age 55) Arzamas, Soviet Union
- Height: 5 ft 10 in (178 cm)
- Weight: 190 lb (86 kg; 13 st 8 lb)
- Position: Defence
- Shot: Right
- Played for: Vancouver Canucks; New York Islanders; Nashville Predators
- National team: Soviet Union
- NHL draft: 117th overall, 1991; Vancouver Canucks
- Playing career: 1988–2005

Yevgeni "John" Yurievich Namestnikov (Russian: Евгений Юрьевич Наместников; born October 9, 1971) is a Russian former professional ice hockey defenceman who spent parts of six seasons in the National Hockey League (NHL) and is currently an NHL amateur scout for the Toronto Maple Leafs. Namestnikov is the father of current NHL player Vladislav Namestnikov and brother-in-law of former NHL player Slava Kozlov.

== Playing career ==
Namestnikov was drafted 117th overall by the Vancouver Canucks in the 1991 NHL entry draft. After spending two more seasons in Russia with CSKA Moscow, he came to North America for the 1993–94 season.

Undersized for an NHL defender, Namestnikov compensated for his size by playing a hard-nosed physical game and was an excellent open-ice hitter. Called up midway through the 1993–94 season, he made an instant impact with his strong play through his first ten or so games, but faded and was returned to the American Hockey League. This pattern would continue throughout his four seasons in the Canuck organization: when called up, he'd make a quick impact with his physical play, but his lack of size and sometimes questionable decision-making would catch up with him, and he'd find himself back in the AHL.

Namestnikov signed as a free agent with the New York Islanders for the 1997–98 season, but again found himself primarily in the minors, appearing in just two games for the Islanders in two seasons with the organization. After a brief stint in the system of the New York Rangers, Namestnikov was dealt to the Nashville Predators, where he played his final two NHL games in the 1999–2000 season. Following his release from Nashville in 2001, he returned to Russia, where he played for five more seasons before retiring in 2006.

Namestnikov appeared in 43 NHL games, recording 9 assists and 24 penalty minutes. He also appeared in two playoff games for the Canucks without recording a point.

== Scouting career ==
Namestnikov works as a scout for the Toronto Maple Leafs. Notable players he has scouted include Nikita Soshnikov and Yegor Korshkov.

== Personal life ==
Namestnikov moved from Russia to Salt Lake City, Utah, in 1993 with his wife and eight-month-old son, Vladislav, who later became an NHL player himself.

== Career statistics ==
=== Regular season and playoffs ===
			Regular season					Playoffs
Season	Team	League	GP	G	A	Pts	PIM	GP	G	A	Pts	PIM
1988–89	Torpedo Gorky	USSR	2	0	0	0	2	8	1	0	1	8
1988–89	Kvarts Bor	USSR-3	6	1	0	1	6	—	—	—	—	—
1989–90	Torpedo Gorky	USSR	23	0	0	0	25	—	—	—	—	—
1989–90	Kvarts Bor	USSR-3	17	0	0	0	20	—	—	—	—	—
1990–91	Torpedo Gorky	USSR	45	3	0	3	20	—	—	—	—	—
1991–92	CSKA Moscow	USSR	34	1	0	1	37	8	0	2	2	10
1991–92	CSKA Moscow-2	USSR-3	2	0	0	0	0	—	—	—	—	—
1992–93	CSKA Moscow	IHL	42	5	5	10	68	—	—	—	—	—
1993–94	Vancouver Canucks	NHL	17	0	5	5	10	—	—	—	—	—
1993–94	Hamilton Canucks	AHL	59	7	27	34	97	4	0	2	2	19
1994–95	Vancouver Canucks	NHL	16	0	3	3	4	1	0	0	0	2
1994–95	Syracuse Crunch	AHL	59	11	22	33	59	—	—	—	—	—
1995–96	Vancouver Canucks	NHL	—	—	—	—	—	1	0	0	0	0
1995–96	Syracuse Crunch	AHL	59	13	34	47	85	15	1	8	9	16
1996–97	Vancouver Canucks	NHL	2	0	0	0	4	—	—	—	—	—
1996–97	Syracuse Crunch	AHL	55	9	37	46	73	3	2	0	2	0
1997–98	New York Islanders	NHL	6	0	1	1	4	—	—	—	—	—
1997–98	Utah Grizzlies	IHL	62	6	19	25	48	4	1	0	1	2
1998–99	Lowell Lock Monsters	AHL	42	12	14	26	42	—	—	—	—	—
1999–00	Nashville Predators	NHL	2	0	0	0	0	—	—	—	—	—
1999–00	Hartford Wolf Pack	AHL	33	1	9	10	14	—	—	—	—	—
1999–00	Milwaukee Admirals	IHL	12	2	3	5	17	3	0	0	0	0
2000–01	Milwaukee Admirals	IHL	56	7	22	29	36	3	0	1	1	0
2001–02	Lada Togliatti	RUS	50	6	7	13	56	4	0	1	1	2
2002–03	Ak Bars Kazan	RUS	34	2	8	10	20	5	1	0	1	4
2003–04	CSKA Moscow	RUS	38	3	3	6	18	—	—	—	—	—
2004–05	CSKA Moscow	RUS	36	0	1	1	26	—	—	—	—	—
2005–06	Mytishchi Khimik	RUS	18	1	2	3	16	—	—	—	—	—
2005–06	HC MVD	RUS	25	0	2	2	28	—	—	—	—	—
AHL totals			307	53	143	196	370	22	3	10	13	35
USSR/RUS totals			347	21	28	49	316	25	2	3	5	24
NHL totals			43	0	9	9	24	2	0	0	0	2

=== International ===
Year	Team	Event	GP	G	A	Pts	PIM
1989	Soviet Union	EJC	6	0	1	1	6
1990	Soviet Union	WJC	7	0	1	1	6
1991	Soviet Union	WJC	7	1	0	1	10
Junior totals			20	1	2	3	22
