= Pavel Kraskovsky =

Russian ice hockey player (born 1996)

- Born: September 11, 1996 (age 30) Yaroslavl, Russia
- Height: 6 ft 4 in (193 cm)
- Weight: 196 lb (89 kg; 14 st 0 lb)
- Position: Forward
- Shoots: Left
- KHL team Former teams: Torpedo Nizhny Novgorod; Lokomotiv Yaroslavl
- NHL draft: 164th overall, 2014; Winnipeg Jets
- Playing career: 2013–present

Pavel Dmitrievich Kraskovsky (Russian: Павел Дмитриевич Красковский; born September 11, 1996) is a Russian professional ice hockey player. He is currently playing with Torpedo Nizhny Novgorod of the Kontinental Hockey League (KHL).

== Playing career ==
Kraskovsky made his Kontinental Hockey League (KHL) debut playing with Lokomotiv Yaroslavl during the 2013–14 KHL season. On June 26, 2014, Kraskovsky was drafted in the 6th round of the 2014 NHL entry draft (164th overall) by the Winnipeg Jets of the National Hockey League

After the winning consecutive Gagarin Cup's with Lokomotiv, Kraskovsky left the club following 13 seasons and was signed to a two-year contract with Torpedo Nizhny Novgorod on 25 June 2026.

== International play ==
Medal record

Representing Russia

Ice hockey

IIHF World Junior Championship
Silver medal – second place	2016 Finland	

Kraskovsky competed for Russia in the 2014 IIHF World U18 Championship.

== Career statistics ==
=== Regular season and playoffs ===
			Regular season					Playoffs
Season	Team	League	GP	G	A	Pts	PIM	GP	G	A	Pts	PIM
2012–13	Loko Yaroslavl	MHL	19	2	3	5	0	—	—	—	—	—
2014–15	Loko Yaroslavl	MHL	39	10	17	27	16	7	0	0	0	2
2013–14	Lokomotiv Yaroslavl	KHL	8	1	0	1	14	—	—	—	—	—
2014–15	Loko Yaroslavl	MHL	38	11	19	30	56	15	4	9	13	8
2014–15	Lokomotiv Yaroslavl	KHL	3	0	0	0	0	—	—	—	—	—
2015–16	Loko Yaroslavl	MHL	4	4	2	6	0	14	6	4	10	24
2015–16	Lokomotiv Yaroslavl	KHL	40	2	3	5	14	5	0	0	0	4
2016–17	Lokomotiv Yaroslavl	KHL	58	8	10	18	18	15	3	1	4	13
2017–18	Lokomotiv Yaroslavl	KHL	53	3	7	10	30	9	0	1	1	4
2018–19	Lokomotiv Yaroslavl	KHL	26	1	2	3	8	9	2	1	3	4
2019–20	Lokomotiv Yaroslavl	KHL	44	2	5	7	8	—	—	—	—	—
2020–21	Lokomotiv Yaroslavl	KHL	56	17	21	38	36	9	0	1	1	0
2021–22	Lokomotiv Yaroslavl	KHL	47	8	13	21	22	4	1	1	2	0
2022–23	Lokomotiv Yaroslavl	KHL	64	8	15	23	20	12	1	3	4	4
2023–24	Lokomotiv Yaroslavl	KHL	68	10	12	22	40	20	1	6	7	6
2024–25	Lokomotiv Yaroslavl	KHL	57	7	5	12	10	21	0	4	4	0
2025–26	Lokomotiv Yaroslavl	KHL	63	4	8	12	28	8	0	2	2	0
KHL totals			587	71	101	172	248	112	8	20	28	35

=== International ===
Year	Team	Event	Result	GP	G	A	Pts	PIM
2013	Russia	U17	2nd place, silver medalist(s)	6	0	2	2	0
2014	Russia	U18	5th	5	0	1	1	2
2016	Russia	WJC	2nd place, silver medalist(s)	7	2	2	4	0
Junior totals				18	2	5	7	2

== Awards and honors ==
Award	Year
KHL
Gagarin Cup champion	2025, 2026
