= Danila Karaban =

Belarusian ice hockey player

- Born: July 26, 1996 (age 30) Novopolotsk, Belarus
- Height: 5 ft 10 in (178 cm)
- Weight: 170 lb (77 kg; 12 st 2 lb)
- Position: Forward
- Shoots: Right
- PHL team Former teams: Saryarqa Karagadna; Dinamo-Shinnik Bobruysk; RCOP Raubichi-96; Dinamo-Raubichi Minsk; HC Dinamo-Molodechno; Dinamo Minsk; Shakhter Soligorsk; Arlan Kokshetau
- National team: Belarus
- Playing career: 2013–present

Danila Karaban (born July 26, 1996) is a Belarusian ice hockey player and a forward for Saryarqa Karagadna and the Belarusian national team.

He participated at the 2017 IIHF World Championship.
