= 2013 World U-17 Hockey Challenge =

Tournament details
- Host country: Canada
- Venue(s): Centre Marcel Dionne, Colisée Desjardins (in 2 host cities)
- Dates: December 29 – January 4
- Teams: 10

The 2013 World Under-17 Hockey Challenge was an ice hockey tournament held in Drummondville and Victoriaville, Quebec, Canada between December 29, 2012 and January 4, 2013. The World Under-17 Hockey Challenge is held by Hockey Canada annually to showcase young hockey talent from across Canada and other strong hockey countries. The primary venues used for the tournament are the Centre Marcel Dionne in Drummondville and the Colisée Desjardins in Victoriaville.

== Challenge results ==
=== Preliminary round ===
==== Group A ====
Team	Pld	W	OTW	OTL	L	GF	GA	GD	Pts
Sweden	4	4	0	0	0	24	10	+14	12
Russia	4	2	0	1	1	22	21	+1	7
Canada Pacific	4	0	3	0	1	20	20	0	6
Finland	4	1	0	1	2	17	21	−4	4
Canada West	4	0	0	1	3	9	20	−11	1

===== Results =====
December 29, 2012	Sweden	4–0	Canada West	Centre Marcel Dionne, Drummondville

H. Tornqvist (PP) – 11:17; G. Franzen (ES) – 25:09; G. Franzen (PP) – 34:50; A. Karlsson (PP) – 36:28 / Goals

December 29, 2012	Canada Pacific	8–7 OT	Russia	Centre Marcel Dionne, Drummondville

C. Bleackley (ES) – 10:04; C. Bleackley (ES) – 17:12; R. Duke (PP) – 22:14; B. Point (ES) – 27:26; R. Gropp (ES) – 29:24; J. Virtanen (ES) – 34:51; T. MacMaster (PP) – 40:39; J. Hicketts (PP) – 60:59 / Goals / 6:20 – Y. Orlov (ES); 9:44 – I. Zinoviev (ES); 24:04 – N. Yazkov (ES); 38:15 – M. Lazarev (ES); 44:36 – R. Fazleyev (ES); 51:00 – I. Nikolishin (PP); 57:57 – E. Nasybullin (PP)

December 30, 2012	Finland	3–7	Sweden	Centre Marcel Dionne, Drummondville

M. Rantanen (ES) – 1:10; T. Lämsä (ES) – 19:33; M. Rantanen (SH) – 42:28 / Goals / 7:23 – P. Engvall (ES); 7:58 – O. Lindblom (ES); 14:27 – J. Forsbacka Karlsson (PP); 32:17 – A. Kempe (ES); 45:05 – W. Nylander Alelius (PP); 57:34 – A. Kempe (EN); 59:22 – A. Kempe (EN)

December 30, 2012	Russia	6–2	Canada West	Centre Marcel Dionne, Drummondville

M. Lazarev (ES) – 14:21; D. Vovchenko (ES) – 23:18; A. Kuzmenko (ES) – 31: 27; Y. Svechnikov (SH) – 39:01; I. Zinoviev (ES) – 44:41; I. Zinoviev (PP) – 59:08 / Goals / 20:50 – R. Chartier (ES); 32:55 – R. Gardner (PP)

December 31, 2012	Canada Pacific	3–6	Sweden	Centre Marcel Dionne, Drummondville

B. Martin (PP) – 36:33; R. Gagnon (ES) – 37:35; J. Virtanen (PP) – 57:33 / Goals / 13:19 – H. Törnqvist (ES); 28:17 – A. Karlsson (ES); 39:10 – G. Franzén (ES); 54:46 – A. Karlsson (PP); 55:16 – O. Lindblom (PP); 58:00 – O. Lindblom (ES)

December 31, 2012	Canada West	4–6	Finland	Centre Marcel Dionne, Drummondville

K. Olynek (ES) – 18:47; A. Brooks (ES) – 38:10; K. Olynek – 41:17; V. Mpofu (PP) – 45:57 / Goals / 20:16 – S. Niku (ES); 29:19 – E. Sopanen (ES); 39:55 – T. Lämsä (PP); 49:04 – M. Mäkinen (ES); 52:35 – K. Kapanen (PP); 59:07 – W. Hopponen (ES)

January 1, 2013	Sweden	7–4	Russia	Colisée Desjardins, Victoriaville

A. Gunnarsson (ES) – 2:11; A. Kempe (PP) – 12:06; A. Karlsson (ES) – 13:06; O. Lindblom (ES) – 37:55; G. Franzen (ES) – 38:52; O. Lindblom (ES) – 57:29; W. Nylander Altelius (PP) – 58:16 / Goals / 20:47 – I. Nikolishin (PP); 25:44 – M. Lazarev (ES); 38:59 – E. Nasybullin (ES); 45:05 – Y. Svechnikov (ES)

January 1, 2013	Finland	4–5 GWS	Canada Pacific	Colisée Desjardins, Victoriaville

A. Saarela (ES) – 8:55; T. Lamsa (PP) – 45:57; J. Kiviranta (ES) – 50:20; K. Kapanen (ES) – 52:10 A. Saarela (miss); K. Kapanen (miss) / Goals / 9:29 – R. Graham (ES); 9:49 – J. Virtanen (ES); 11:51 – J. Virtanen (PP); 22:40 – R. Duke (PP) (miss) C. Bleackley; B. Point; J. Virtanen

January 2, 2013	Russia	5–4	Finland	Colisée Desjardins, Victoriaville

Y. Svechnikov (ES) – 19:45; M. Lazarev (PP) – 21:51; Y. Svechnikov (PP) – 30:37; N. Yazkov (ES) – 30:58; K. Pilipenko (ES) – 38:49 / Goals / 9:58 – A. Makinen (ES); 37:29 – J. Kiviranta (ES); 50:26 – A. Saarela (SH); 50:55 – K. Kapanen (ES)

January 2, 2013	Canada West	3–4 OT	Canada Pacific	Colisée Desjardins, Victoriaville

K. Olynek (ES) – 00:55; M. Warkentine (ES) – 36:00; R. Gardiner (ES) – 56:59 / Goals / 17:14 – J. Thrower (PP); 29:48 – B. Point (PP); 44:06 – T. MacMaster (ES); 60:45 – B. Hickey (ES)

==== Group B ====
Team	Pld	W	OTW	OTL	L	GF	GA	GD	Pts
United States	4	3	1	0	0	24	11	+13	11
Canada Quebec	4	3	0	0	1	11	10	+1	9
Canada Ontario	4	2	0	1	1	29	9	+20	7
Canada Atlantic	4	1	0	0	3	10	23	−13	3
Slovakia	4	0	0	0	4	5	26	−21	0

===== Results =====
December 29, 2012	Canada Ontario	5–6 GWS	United States	Colisée Desjardins, Victoriaville

A. Ekblad (PP) – 10:55; J. Ho-Sang (ES) – 21:57; D. De Sousa (SH) – 24:44; C. McDavid (ES) – 51:25; S. Bennett (ES) – 49:36 C. McDavid (miss); J. Ho-Sang (miss); S. Bennett (miss) / Goals / 20:33 – R. Hitchcock (ES); 37:38 – J. Eichel (ES); 42:59 – K. Iverson (ES); 49:14 – J. Eichel (PP); 51:39 – S. Milano (PP) S. Milano; (miss) D. Turgeon

December 29, 2012	Canada Atlantic	2–5	Canada Quebec	Colisée Desjardins, Victoriaville

C. Bishop (PP) – 30:32; C. Bishop (PP) – 44:12 / Goals / 13:23 – J. Nantel (ES); 21:44 – N. Aubé-Kubel (PP); 32:42 – A. Richard (ES); 37:39 – N. Aubé-Kubel (ES); 56:09 – N. Hebert (ES)

December 30, 2012	United States	6–3	Canada Atlantic	Colisée Desjardins, Victoriaville

S. Milano (PP) – 7:47; J. Fiegl (ES) – 8:11; N. Billitier (PP) – 13:57; D. Larkin (ES) – 32:05; A. Poganski (PP) – 43:59; R. Collins (ES) – 53:47 / Goals / 6:10 – D. MacIntyre (PP); 18:11 – M. Highmore (PP); 50:05 – C. Bishop (PP)

December 30, 2012	Canada Ontario	12–0	Slovakia	Arena Leo-Paul-Boutin, Plessisville

D. Salituro (PP) – 8:45; S. Bennett (ES) – 10:04; C. McDavid (ES) – 21:06; C. McDavid (PP) – 24:36; S. Watson (PP) – 28:48; J. Ho-Sang (ES) – 31:13; C. McDavid (ES) – 31:47; J. Lindo (ES) – 32:07; S. Bennett (ES) – 40:45; B. Hargrave (ES) – 45:21; R. Fabbri (ES) – 49:51; R. Fabbri (ES) – 56:18 / Goals

December 31, 2012	Slovakia	1–4	Canada Atlantic	Colisée Desjardins, Victoriaville

M. Surovy (ES) – 41:56 / Goals / 22:21 – J. Pugsley (ES); 41:45 – K. Kielly (ES); 45:32 – K. Kielly (PP); 52:02 – L. Hynes (ES)

December 31, 2012	United States	5–1	Canada Quebec	Colisée Desjardins, Victoriaville

J. Eichel (PP) – 2:15; R. MacInnis (ES) – 32:55; A. Poganski (ES) – 34:37; R. Bliss (ES) – 51:45; C. Wilkie (ES) – 53:22 / Goals / 35:40 – N. Aubé-Kubel (ES)

January 1, 2013	Canada Atlantic	1–11	Canada Ontario	Centre Marcel Dionne, Drummondville

L. Batt (ES) – 29:21 / Goals / 2:06 – D. Salituro (ES); 5:40 – M. Dal Colle (ES); 29:58 – J. McCann (ES); 33:11 – M. Dal Colle (PP); 33:23 – J. Ho-Sang (ES); 35:43 – S. Watson (PP); 40:42 – S. Watson (PP); 42:28 – R. Fabbri (ES); 49:57 – D. Salituro (ES); 51:18 – S. Watson (ES); 53:54 – D. Bourne (PP)

January 1, 2013	Canada Quebec	3–2	Slovakia	Centre Marcel Dionne, Drummondville

A. Pepin (ES) – 8:08; V. Deslauriers (ES) – 13:28; A. Pepin (ES) – 51:14 / Goals / 21:55 – M. Paločko (ES); 50:48 – A. Holešinský (ES)

January 2, 2013	Slovakia	2–7	United States	Centre Marcel Dionne, Drummondville

A. Holesinsky (ES) – 5:55; A. Hascic (ES) – 29:45 / Goals / 0:56 – S. Milano (ES); 9:15 – D. Larkin (ES); 10:35 – A. Tuch (ES); 17:29 – R. MacInnis (PP); 43:34 – R. Hitchcock (ES); 54:02 – R. Collins (PP); 54:40 – S. Milano (ES)

January 2, 2013	Canada Quebec	2–1	Canada Ontario	Centre Marcel Dionne, Drummondville

C. Neill (PP) – 22:13; L. Leveille (PP) – 23:49 / Goals / 3:48 – B. Hargrave (ES)

=== Final round ===
Semifinals
A1	Sweden	6
B2	Canada Quebec	4
B1	United States	4
A2	Russia	6

Final
SF1	Sweden	7
SF2	Russia	5

==== Semifinals ====
January 3, 2013	Sweden	6–4	Canada Quebec	Centre Marcel Dionne, Drummondville

O. Lindblom (ES) – 7:58; P. Engvall (ES) – 18:55; O. Lindblom (SH) – 29:27; J. Forsbacka Karlsson (SH) – 37:19; O. Lindblom (PP) – 48:00; H. Tornqvist (ES) – 58:11 / Goals / 11:54 – A. Pepin (PP); 17:04 – N. Aubé-Kubel (ES); 42:11 – O. LeBlanc (PP); 48:43 – D. Audette (ES)

January 3, 2013	United States	4–6	Russia	Colisée Desjardins, Victoriaville

C. Wilkie (PP) – 2:14; C. Wilkie (ES) – 16:22; A. Poganski (PP) – 38:56; J. Glover (PP) – 47:51 / Goals / 16:35 – Y. Svechnikov (ES); 35:27 – I. Nikolishin (ES); 40:45 – R. Fazleyev (PP); 44:42 – M. Lazarev (PP); 45:17 – R. Fazleyev (ES); 59:34 – Y. Svechnikov (ENG)

==== 9th place game ====
January 3, 2013	Canada West	4–1	Slovakia	Pavillon Jean-Beliveau, Victoriaville

H. Fleury (ES) – 2:28; J. Uhrich (ES) – 9:18; R. Gardner (ES) – 37:13; R. Gardiner (SH) – 52:38 / Goals / 34:19 – A. Hascic (SH)

==== 7th place game ====
January 3, 2013	Finland	8–2	Canada Atlantic	Centre Marcel Dionne, Drummondville

M. Makinen (ES) – 1:39; M. Honkanen (ES) – 15:48; T. Lamsa (ES) – 21:18; M. Honkanen (PP) – 23:19; T. Lamsa (ES) – 25:27; T. Lamsa (ES) – 44:50; J. Nättinen (ES) – 53:23; J. Tuulola (PP) – 55:30 / Goals / 24:21 – L. Hynes (PP); 46:42 – K. Kielly (ES)

==== 5th place game ====
January 3, 2013	Canada Pacific	7–6	Canada Ontario	Colisée Desjardins, Victoriaville

R. Graham (ES) – 2:17; R. Gropp (ES) – 12:49; B. Martin (PP) – 16:27; T. MacMaster (PP) – 23:00; T. MacMaster (PP) – 39:12; J. Virtanen (ES) – 39:55; C. Bleackley (ES) – 58:29 / Goals / 1:36 – C. McDavid (PP); 12:35 – A. Ekblad (PP); 13:25 – J. Lindo (PP); 38:12 – J. Middleton (PP); 39:35 – C. McDavid (ES); 41:51 – S. Watson (ES)

==== Bronze medal game ====
January 4, 2013	Canada Quebec	3–4	United States	Centre Marcel Dionne, Drummondville

N. Marois (ES) – 16:03; C. Neill (PP) – 38:37; F. Perron (ES) – 59:26 / Goals / 19:43 – A. Poganski (PP); 35:46 – A. Poganski (ES); 49:52 – A. Poganski (PP); 50:37 – R. MacInnis (ES)

==== Gold medal game ====
January 4, 2013	Sweden	7–5	Russia	Colisée Desjardins, Victoriaville; Attendance: 4,192

G. Franzen (ES) – 6:49; R. Kovacs (ES) – 12:19; A. Kempe (ES) – 28:09; A. Gunarrsson (PP) – 35:20; A. Karlsson (PP) – 49:56; G. Franzen (PP) – 51:41; A. Karlsson (EN) – 59:38 / Goals / 6:24 – N. Yazkov (ES); 10:32 – I. Nikolishin (ES); 31:20 – A. Mikulovich (ES); 38:03 – Y. Svechnikov (ES); 58:05 – E. Nasybullin (PP)

== Scoring leaders ==
Player	Country	GP	G	A	Pts	PIM
Oskar Lindblom	Sweden	6	8	5	13	0
Gustaf Franzen	Sweden	6	6	4	10	2
Maxim Lazarev	Russia	6	5	5	10	8
Sonny Milano	United States	6	4	6	10	6
William Nylander Altelius	Sweden	6	2	8	10	2
Anton Karlsson	Sweden	6	6	3	9	22
Connor McDavid	Canada Ontario	5	6	3	9	2
Chris Wilkie	United States	6	3	6	9	2
Kasperi Kapanen	Finland	5	3	6	9	4
Brycen Martin	Canada Pacific	5	2	7	9	2

== Goaltending leaders ==
(Minimum 60 minutes played)

Player	Country	MINS	GA	Sv%	GAA	SO
Mikael Saari	Finland	62:11	2	.920	1.93	0
Julio Billia	Canada Quebec	240:00	14	.905	3.05	0
Alex Bureau	Canada Quebec	118:35	6	.889	3.04	0
Jesper Eriksson	Sweden	240:00	12	.886	3.00	1
Felix Sandström	Sweden	120:00	7	.885	3.50	0

== Final standings ==
	Team
1st place, gold medalist(s)	Sweden
2nd place, silver medalist(s)	Russia
3rd place, bronze medalist(s)	United States
4	Canada Quebec
5	Canada Pacific
6	Canada Ontario
7	Finland
8	Canada Atlantic
9	Canada West
10	Slovakia

== Tournament All-Star Team ==
- Goaltender: (Canada) Quebec Julio Billia
- Defencemen: (Russia) Nikita Lyamkin, (Sweden) Adam Ollas Mattsson
- Forwards: (Sweden) Oskar Lindblom, (Canada) Ontario Connor McDavid, (United States) Sonny Milano

== See also ==
- World U-17 Hockey Challenge
- 2013 IIHF World U18 Championships
- 2013 World Junior Ice Hockey Championships
