= Jakob Forsbacka Karlsson =

Swedish ice hockey player (born 1996)

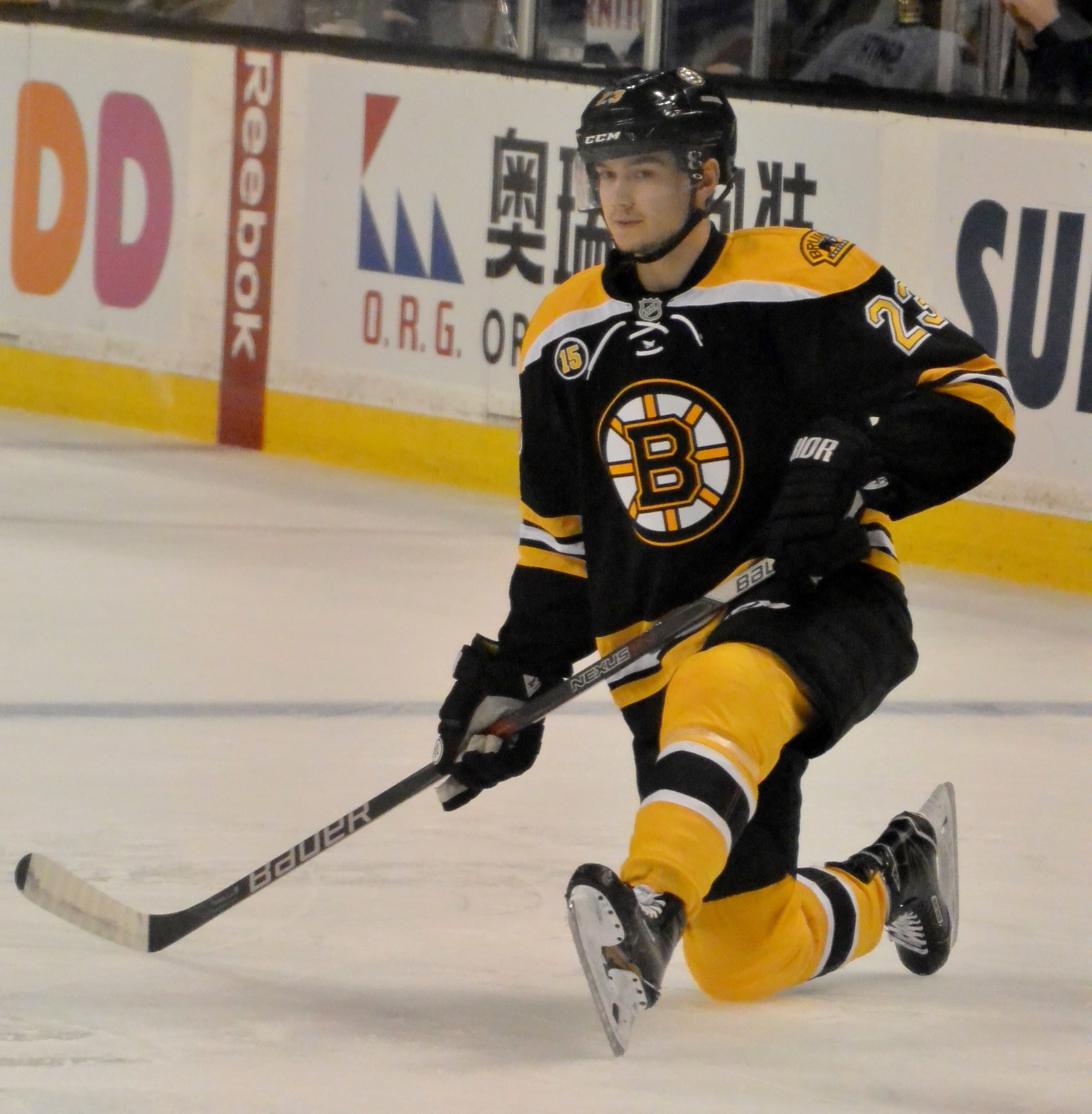
- Forsbacka Karlsson with the Boston Bruins in 2017
- Born: 31 October 1996 (age 29) Stockholm, Sweden
- Height: 6 ft 1 in (185 cm)
- Weight: 184 lb (83 kg; 13 st 2 lb)
- Position: Centre
- Shot: Right
- Played for: Boston Bruins; Växjö Lakers; Färjestad BK
- NHL draft: 45th overall, 2015; Boston Bruins
- Playing career: 2017–2021

Jakob Forsbacka Karlsson (born 31 October 1996) is a Swedish former professional ice hockey player, who played for the Boston Bruins in the National Hockey League (NHL). Nicknamed "JFK", Forsbacka Karlsson was drafted by the Bruins in the second round (45th overall) of the 2015 NHL entry draft.

== Playing career ==
For the 2013–14 season, Forsbacka Karlsson moved to North America to play with the Omaha Lancers of the United States Hockey League (USHL). During the 2014–15 season, Forsbacka Karlsson led the Lancers in scoring with 53 points in 50 games. He was selected to participate in the 2014 CCM/USA Hockey All-American Prospects Game where he was named his team's the most valuable player.

Forsbacka Karlsson committed to play the 2015–16 season with Boston University, and following the 2016–17 Terriers' run for the 2017 NCAA Division I Men's Ice Hockey Tournament, as announced on 2 April 2017, Forsbacka Karlsson signed a three-year, entry-level contract with the Boston Bruins. Following a call up from the Providence Bruins to Boston to help bolster the Bruins' injury-riddled lineup in November 2018, Forsbacka Karlsson scored his first NHL goal on 17 November 2018, in a 2–1 loss the Arizona Coyotes.

Having completed his entry-level contract at the conclusion of the 2018–19 season, Forsbacka Karlsson split the season between Boston and Providence, establishing new career marks in the NHL with 9 points in 28 games.

As an impending restricted free agent, and with the Bruins in the midst of their playoff run to the 2019 Stanley Cup Finals, Forsbacka Karlsson opted to pause his NHL career and return to Sweden after six years, citing family reasons. He signed a two-year contract in the SHL with the Växjö Lakers on 21 May 2019.

== International play ==
Medal record

Representing Sweden

Ice hockey

World U-17 Hockey Challenge
Gold medal – first place	2013 Quebec	

Forsbacka Karlsson helped Swedish team win the gold medal at the 2013 World U-17 Hockey Challenge. He also competed with Sweden at both the 2013 and 2014 IIHF World U18 Championships.

== Career statistics ==
=== Regular season and playoffs ===
			Regular season					Playoffs
Season	Team	League	GP	G	A	Pts	PIM	GP	G	A	Pts	PIM
2011–12	Nacka HK	J18	26	13	19	32	16	—	—	—	—	—
2012–13	Linköpings HC	J18	9	10	15	25	6	—	—	—	—	—
2012–13	Linköpings HC	J18 Allsv	8	5	5	10	10	2	0	0	0	0
2012–13	Linköpings HC	J20	31	9	7	16	26	5	0	2	2	4
2013–14	Omaha Lancers	USHL	60	11	22	33	26	4	0	1	1	4
2014–15	Omaha Lancers	USHL	50	15	38	53	38	—	—	—	—	—
2015–16	Boston University	HE	39	10	20	30	28	—	—	—	—	—
2016–17	Boston University	HE	39	14	19	33	32	—	—	—	—	—
2016–17	Boston Bruins	NHL	1	0	0	0	0	—	—	—	—	—
2017–18	Providence Bruins	AHL	58	15	17	32	26	4	1	0	1	2
2018–19	Providence Bruins	AHL	28	7	9	16	6	4	0	0	0	0
2018–19	Boston Bruins	NHL	28	3	6	9	2	—	—	—	—	—
2019–20	Växjö Lakers	SHL	40	5	8	13	2	—	—	—	—	—
2020–21	Växjö Lakers	SHL	26	0	4	4	4	—	—	—	—	—
2020–21	Färjestad BK	SHL	24	5	4	9	4	6	0	0	0	2
NHL totals			29	3	6	9	2	—	—	—	—	—

=== International ===
Year	Team	Event	Result	GP	G	A	Pts	PIM
2013	Sweden	U17	1st place, gold medalist(s)	6	2	3	5	2
2013	Sweden	WJC18	5th	5	0	1	1	10
2014	Sweden	WJC18	4th	5	0	2	2	6
2016	Sweden	WJC	4th	7	1	4	5	2
Junior totals				23	3	10	13	20

== Awards and honors ==
Award	Year
J18 Elit
Most Points by U16 Player (32)	2011–12
USHL
CCM/USA Hockey All-American Prospects Game	2015
Team West MVP	2015
Third All-Star Team	2015
College
HE All-Rookie Team	2016
International
World U-17 Hockey Challenge gold medal	2013
