= Ryan MacInnis =

German-American ice hockey player

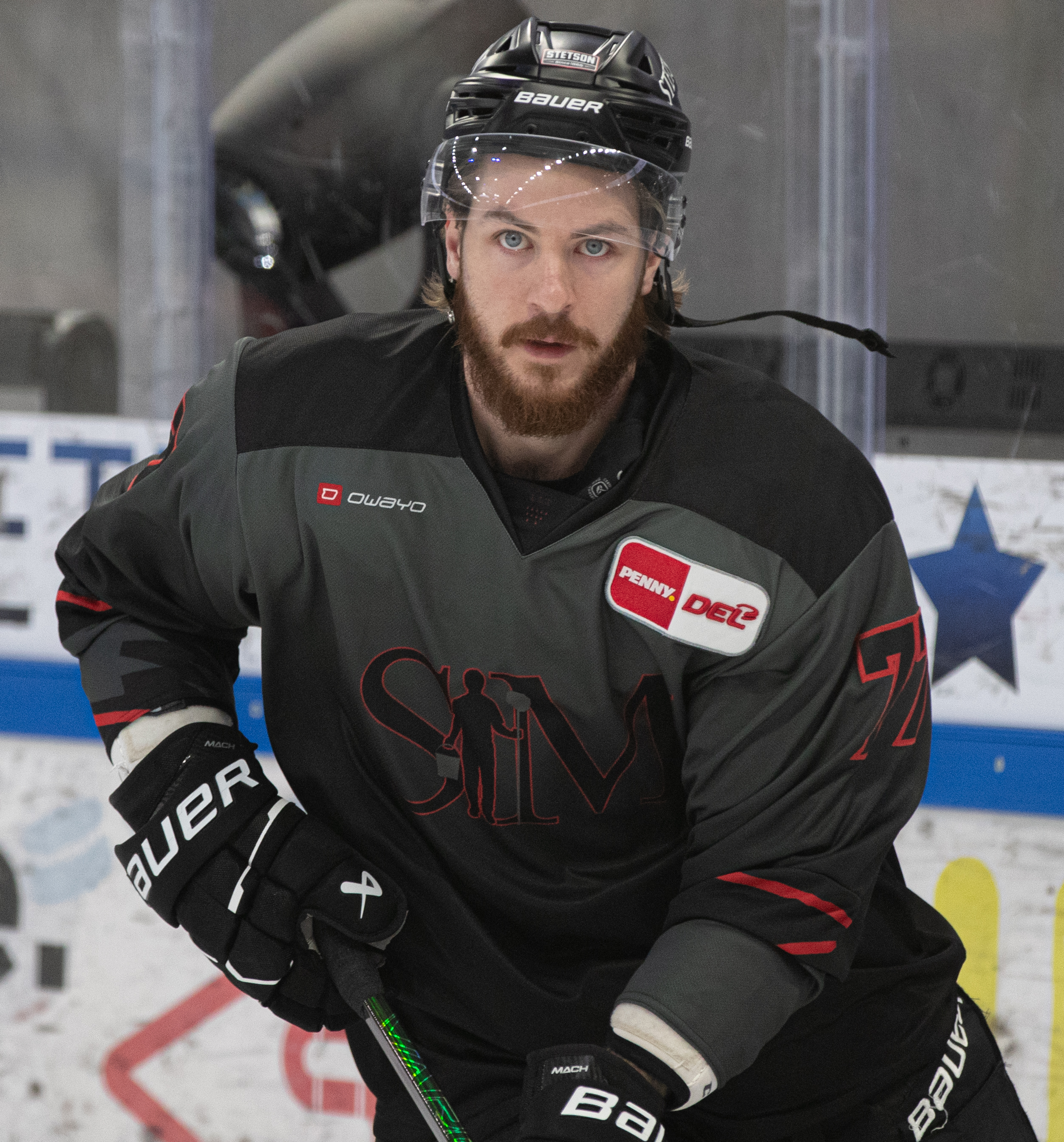
- MacInnis with Kölner Haie in 2025
- Born: February 14, 1996 (age 30) St. Louis, Missouri, U.S.
- Height: 6 ft 3 in (191 cm)
- Weight: 201 lb (91 kg; 14 st 5 lb)
- Position: Center
- Shoots: Left
- DEL team Former teams: Kölner Haie; Columbus Blue Jackets; Buffalo Sabres; Adler Mannheim
- NHL draft: 43rd overall, 2014; Arizona Coyotes
- Playing career: 2016–present

Ryan MacInnis (born February 14, 1996) is an American professional ice hockey forward. He is currently playing under contract with Kölner Haie of the Deutsche Eishockey Liga (DEL). MacInnis was selected by the Arizona Coyotes in the second round (43rd overall) of the 2014 NHL entry draft. His father is the Hockey Hall of Fame defenseman Al MacInnis.

== Playing career ==
MacInnis trained with the USA Hockey National Team Development Program team during the 2012–13 season. He played with Team USA at the 2012 Winter Youth Olympics, and he help the USA squad capture a bronze medal at the 2013 World U-17 Hockey Challenge MacInnis joined the Kitchener Rangers of the Ontario Hockey League for the 2013–14 season, and was invited to take part in both the 2013 CCM/NHL Top Prospects Game and the 2014 CHL/NHL Top Prospects Game.

On April 10, 2015, MacInnis was signed to a three-year entry-level contract with the Arizona Coyotes.

After the 2017–18 season, and having been unable to make progression in two seasons with the Coyotes' affiliate, the Tucson Roadrunners, MacInnis was traded to the Columbus Blue Jackets in exchange for Jacob Graves on July 19, 2018.

MacInnis made his first appearance in an NHL game with the Blue Jackets on December 21, 2019 against the New Jersey Devils. On December 27, 2019, MacInnis picked up his first career NHL point with an assist against the Washington Capitals.

As a free agent from the Blue Jackets after three seasons within the organization, MacInnis signed a one-year, two-way contract to join the Buffalo Sabres on July 30, 2021. In the 2021–22 season, MacInnis primarily featured with the Sabres AHL affiliate, the Rochester Americans. He was recalled and made a single appearance with the Sabres, going scoreless.

Leaving the Sabres organization as a free agent, MacInnis went unsigned over the summer leading into the 2022–23 season. On October 4, 2022, MacInnis agreed to his first contract abroad in signing a one-year deal with German club, Adler Mannheim of the DEL.

== Career statistics ==
=== Regular season and playoffs ===
			Regular season					Playoffs
Season	Team	League	GP	G	A	Pts	PIM	GP	G	A	Pts	PIM
2012–13	U.S. National Development Team	USHL	41	8	6	14	6	—	—	—	—	—
2013–14	Kitchener Rangers	OHL	66	16	21	37	18	—	—	—	—	—
2014–15	Kitchener Rangers	OHL	67	25	37	62	28	6	3	5	8	6
2015–16	Kitchener Rangers	OHL	59	38	43	81	49	9	5	8	13	8
2015–16	Springfield Falcons	AHL	2	0	0	0	0	—	—	—	—	—
2016–17	Tucson Roadrunners	AHL	68	8	9	17	50	—	—	—	—	—
2017–18	Tucson Roadrunners	AHL	59	6	8	14	22	9	2	1	3	2
2018–19	Cleveland Monsters	AHL	71	4	20	24	39	8	1	2	3	2
2019–20	Cleveland Monsters	AHL	45	7	23	30	22	—	—	—	—	—
2019–20	Columbus Blue Jackets	NHL	10	0	1	1	0	—	—	—	—	—
2020–21	Cleveland Monsters	AHL	5	1	1	2	0	—	—	—	—	—
2020–21	Columbus Blue Jackets	NHL	16	0	0	0	0	—	—	—	—	—
2021–22	Rochester Americans	AHL	49	11	16	27	33	10	0	1	1	2
2021–22	Buffalo Sabres	NHL	1	0	0	0	0	—	—	—	—	—
2022–23	Adler Mannheim	DEL	37	8	14	22	8	12	2	3	5	2
2023–24	Adler Mannheim	DEL	22	5	5	10	2	7	3	1	4	0
2024–25	Adler Mannheim	DEL	29	8	11	19	8	9	0	1	1	6
NHL totals			27	0	1	1	0	—	—	—	—	—
DEL totals			88	21	30	51	18	28	5	5	10	8

=== International ===
Year	Team	Event	Result	GP	G	A	Pts	PIM
2013	United States	U17	3rd place, bronze medalist(s)	6	2	3	5	0
2016	United States	WJC	3rd place, bronze medalist(s)	7	0	3	3	2
Junior totals				13	2	6	8	2

== Awards and honors ==
Honors	Year
Youth Olympic Games	2012
World U-17 Hockey Challenge Bronze Medal	2013
CCM/NHL Top Prospects Game	2013
CHL/NHL Top Prospects Game (Team Cherry)	2014
