= Walter Gretzky =

Canadian ice hockey coach (1938–2021)

Walter Gretzky CM OOnt
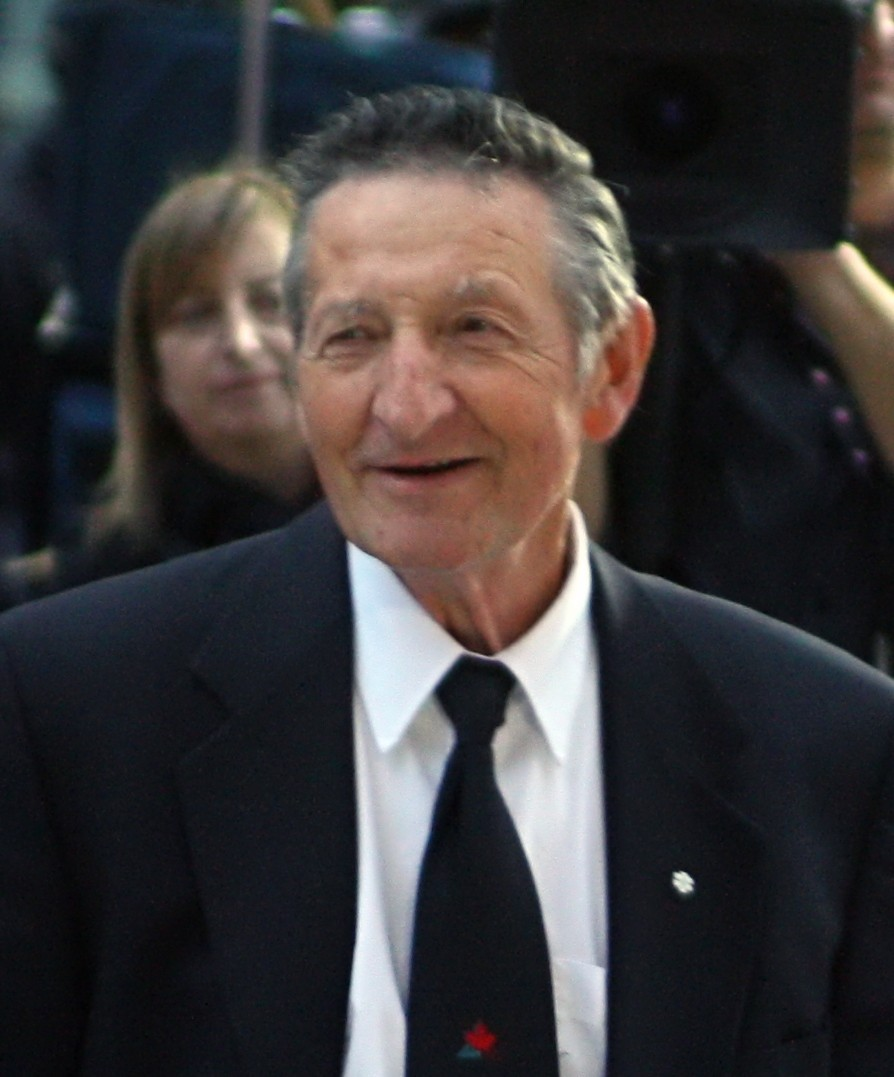
- Gretzky in 2010
- Born: October 8, 1938; Canning, Ontario, Canada
- Died: March 4, 2021 (aged 82); Brantford, Ontario, Canada
- Occupation: Bell Canada repairman
- Spouse: Phyllis Hockin (m. 1960; died 2005)
- Children: 5, including Wayne, Keith and Brent

Walter Gretzky CM, OOnt (8 October 1938 – 4 March 2021) was a Canadian philanthropist who was the father of Canadian ice hockey player Wayne Gretzky.

An avid hockey player as a youth, and a keen analyst of the game, he built a backyard rink for his children, and coached Wayne continually from the age of three, devising creative exercises and drills, and teaching him profound insights into how to play successfully. Wayne credited his father as playing a key role in his success, citing advice such as "skate to where the puck is going, not where it has been".

Gretzky contributed to minor hockey in Canada, and helped many local, provincial and national charities, for which he was honoured.

== Early life ==
The Gretzky family were Tsarist landowners in the Russian Empire, originally from Grodno (now in the Republic of Belarus). Prior to the outbreak of the Russian Revolution, Gretzky's father Anton ("Tony") Gretzky, immigrated along with his family to Canada. Following World War I, Anton, who served in the Canadian Expeditionary Force, would marry his wife, Mary.

Gretzky's ancestry is typically described as either Belarusian, Ukrainian, or Polish. In interviews, Walter Gretzky has stated that his parents were "White Russians from Belarus", and whenever anyone asked his father if he was Russian, "he'd say, "Nyet. Belarus", meaning, White Russian, the upper class". At home "the only Slavic language spoken in the Gretzky family [was] Ukrainian," of which Walter was a fluent speaker from birth.

Tony and Mary owned a 25-acre (10 ha) cucumber farm in Canning, Ontario, where Walter Gretzky was born and raised. This is where he met his future wife, Phyllis Hockin, at a wiener roast when she was 15 and he was 18. She may have been a descendant of British General Sir Isaac Brock, a hero of the War of 1812. They married in 1960, and moved to Brantford, Ontario, where Gretzky worked as a cable repairman for Bell Telephone Canada. The family moved into a house on Varadi Avenue in Brantford seven months after the birth of their son, Wayne, chosen partly because the yard was flat enough to be able to make an ice rink every winter. The couple would later have a daughter, Kim, and three more sons, Keith, Glen, and Brent.

== Background in sport ==
Gretzky was an athlete in high school. In track and field, he set school records in running, pole vault, and long jump. He preferred hockey, and in his teens was a prolific goal-scorer during five years of play with the Junior B-level Woodstock Warriors. He set his sights on the National Hockey League (NHL), and some thought he was destined to make it there.

A local car salesman gave Gretzky a bargain so he could more easily drive to hockey games in and around Woodstock, but his relatively small size and weight, at 5-foot-9 inches and 140 lbs, was a problem for progressing in hockey. He tried out for the Junior A level Toronto Marlboros, a few weeks after catching chicken pox and losing considerable weight. Although he scored just as many goals in the tryout game as any of his fellow hopefuls, he was judged to be too small for the higher league. He returned to play with the Woodstock team.

== Career ==
Walter was an installer and repairman for Bell Canada for 34 years, retiring in 1991. A work-related injury in 1961 put him in a coma and deafened his right ear.

Five days after his 53rd birthday, in 1991, a near-fatal brain aneurysm impaired his short-term memory. His physical therapist, Ian Kohler, married his daughter Kim in 1995. His ordeal is the basis of the CBC movie Waking Up Wally: The Walter Gretzky Story.

He helped charities and fundraisers and coached at his summer youth hockey camp in California.

== Coaching ==
Walter Gretzky devised numerous creative ways to develop hockey skills, which were often ahead of their time in Canada. Wayne Gretzky would later remark that the Soviet national team's practice drills, which impressed Canada in 1972, had nothing to offer him: "I'd been doing those drills since I was three. My Dad was very smart."

Some say I have a "sixth sense" ... Baloney, I've just learned to guess what's going to happen next. It's anticipation. It's not God-given, it's Wally-given. He used to stand on the blue line and say to me, "Watch, this is how everybody else does it." Then he'd shoot a puck along the boards and into the corner and then go chasing after it. Then he'd come back and say, "Now, this is how the smart player does it." He'd shoot it into the corner again, only this time he cut across to the other side and picked it up over there. Who says anticipation can't be taught?

In his autobiography, Wayne describes how his Dad would teach him the fundamentals of smart hockey, quiz style:

Him: "Where do you skate?"
Me: "To where the puck is going, not where it's been."
Him: "Where's the last place a guy looks before he passes it?"
Me: "The guy he's passing to."
Him: "Which means..."
Me: "Get over there and intercept it."
Him: "If you get cut off, what are you gonna do?"
Me: "Peel."
Him: "Which way?"
Me: "Away from the guy, not towards him."

From September 2004 to April 2005, Walter was an assistant coach for the University of Pittsburgh inline hockey team. A long time friend of head coach Bob Coyne, Walter was hired by team president Ryan Gaus as an assistant coach, along with Bob Bradley and Tim Fryer. Pitt participated in the Eastern Collegiate Roller Hockey Association (ECRHA) at the Division I level.

== Charity ==
=== CNIB ===
Walter had worked for the CNIB Foundation (formerly the Canadian National Institute for the Blind). The entire Gretzky family is now associated with the CNIB.

The Gretzkys' support of the CNIB started when Wayne was 19 years old. Two completely blind boys started to talk to him, and one recognized him by his voice. He felt a sense of compassion and persuaded his father to set up a golf tournament to raise cash for the CNIB. These tournaments soon gained fame and attracted NHL players and celebrities. Brendan Shanahan, the Toronto Maple Leafs, Eddie Mio, Brett Hull, Gordie Howe, Scott Stevens, Mark Messier, Marty McSorley, Glen Campbell and Paul Coffey are among hockey names that have attended. Celebrities who have attended include John Candy, Rob Lowe, Teri Garr, Alan Thicke, Jamie Farr, Bob Woods, Kevin Smith, and David Foster. All the money from these tournaments funds visually impaired Canadian university students. At the first tournament, Walter had enough money raised to award three scholarships, which increased to 15 scholarships a year. After eleven years, these tournaments raised over three million dollars.

=== SCORE program ===
Another fundraiser that Walter Gretzky established was the SCORE program (Summer Computer Orientation Recreational Education). SCORE helps blind students learn computer skills that will be needed for jobs in the future and increases blind students' access to computer programs and internet applications. So far SCORE has provided over 500 career positions for visually impaired students.

== Books ==
Gretzky wrote two books: On Family, Hockey and Healing (2001), and Gretzky: From Backyard Rink to the Stanley Cup (1985), in which he recounted how he recognized Wayne's prodigious skills and shaped him into the most prolific scorer in hockey history.

== Honours ==
Gretzky was awarded the "Brantford Citizen of the Year award" in 1996. He was also an inductee to the Brantford Walk of Fame. He was also awarded the honorary title of Lord Mayor of Brantford.

He was appointed as a Member of the Order of Ontario (O.Ont) in 2002. Gretzky was named a Member of the Order of Canada on December 28, 2007, "for his contributions to minor hockey in Canada and for his dedication to helping a myriad of local, provincial, and national charities". On February 12, 2010, Gretzky carried the Olympic Torch during the Olympic Relay on the last day of the relay, hours before the opening ceremonies in Vancouver, British Columbia, where Wayne later lit the Olympic Flame.

He received honorary degrees from three universities. These included:

- Doctor of Laws (LL.D) from McMaster University in November 2002.
- Doctor of Education (D.Ed.) from Nipissing University in 2006.
- Doctor of Letters (D.Litt.) from Wilfrid Laurier University in June 2014.

On April 12, 2012, in his home town of Brantford, Ontario, the Grand Erie District School Board opened Walter Gretzky Elementary School. It is part of a dual-track Catholic-Public Green School with the Brant Haldimand-Norfolk Catholic District School Board's St. Basil's School.

In 2021, Northridge Golf Course in Brantford, Ontario was renamed as the Walter Gretzky Municipal Golf Course, Banquet and Learning Academy.

== Illness and death ==
Gretzky's wife Phyllis died of lung cancer on December 19, 2005. Gretzky was diagnosed with Parkinson's disease in 2012 and died on March 4, 2021, after suffering a hip injury three weeks prior, at the age of 82. Gretzky's funeral was held at St. Mark's Anglican Church in Brantford on March 6. He was buried at Farringdon Burial Ground in Brantford.

== See also ==
- Challenge Cup

== General bibliography ==
- Czuboka, Michael (1983). Ukrainian Canadian, eh?. Communigraphics. ISBN 9780920073001.
- Gretzky, Walter (2001). On Family, Hockey and Healing. Anchor Canada. ISBN 9780307369376.
- Gretzky, Wayne; Davidson, John (1999). Diamond, Dan (ed.). 99: My Life in Pictures. Toronto, Ontario: Total Sports Canada. ISBN 978-0-920445-67-9.
- Gretzky, Wayne; Reilly, Rick (1990). Gretzky: An Autobiography. New York: HarperCollins. ISBN 978-0-06-016339-6.
- Redmond, Gerald (1993). Wayne Gretzky: The Great One. Toronto, Ontario: ECW Press. ISBN 978-1-55022-190-9.
