= Radel Fazleev =

Russian ice hockey player

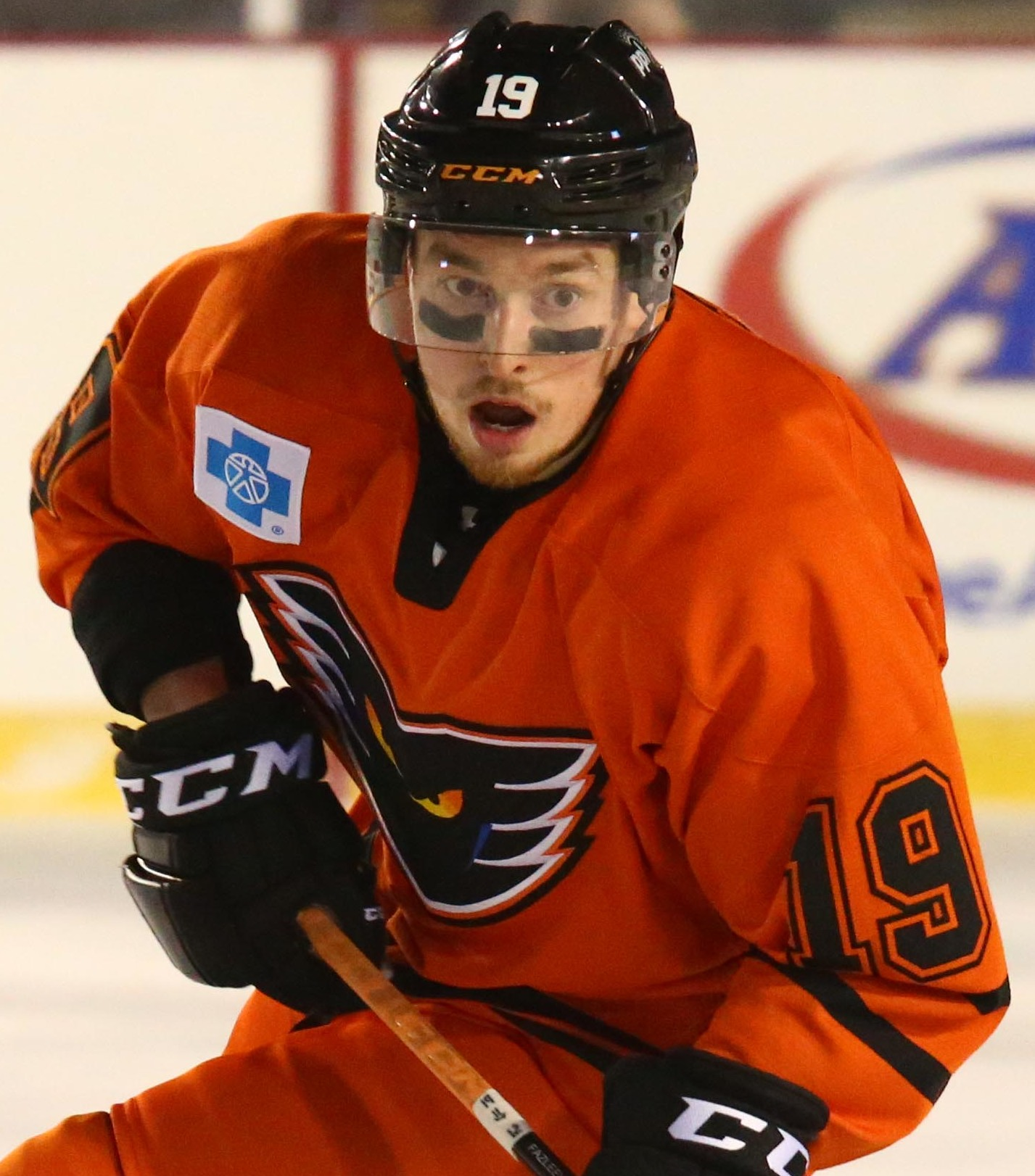
- Fazleev with the Lehigh Valley Phantoms in 2018
- Born: 7 January 1996 (age 30) Kazan, Russia
- Height: 6 ft 0 in (183 cm)
- Weight: 176 lb (80 kg; 12 st 8 lb)
- Position: Center
- Shoots: Left
- KAZ team Former teams: Humo Tashkent; Lehigh Valley Phantoms; Neftekhimik Nizhnekamsk
- NHL draft: 168th overall, 2014; Philadelphia Flyers
- Playing career: 2016–present

Radel Fazleyev (Russian: Радель Равилевич Фазлеев; born 7 January 1996) is a Russian professional ice hockey forward who currently plays for Humo Tashkent of the Pro Hokei Ligasy (KAZ). He was drafted in the sixth round of the 2014 NHL entry draft by the Philadelphia Flyers.

== Playing career ==
Fazleyev signed a three-year entry-level contract with the Flyers on 28 May 2015 and played three seasons with their American Hockey League affiliate the Lehigh Valley Phantoms. Midway through his third season with the Phantoms, Fazleyev agreed to a mutual termination of the final year of his contract and he signed with Ak Bars Kazan on 25 December 2018.

In the 2019-20 season, Fazleev initially began with HC Neftekhimik Nizhnekamsk, appearing in 14 games before returning in a trade to the Ak Bars Kazan organization. He was unable to solidify a role within Ak Bars and was released as a free agent at the conclusion of the VHL season.

On 26 June 2020, Fazleev was signed to a one-year contract to continue in the VHL with Neftyanik Almetievsk.

== Career statistics ==
=== Regular season and playoffs ===
			Regular season					Playoffs
Season	Team	League	GP	G	A	Pts	PIM	GP	G	A	Pts	PIM
2012–13	Bars Kazan	MHL	9	0	0	0	0	—	—	—	—	—
2012–13	Irbis Kazan	MHLB	23	7	10	17	8	5	1	2	3	4
2013–14	Calgary Hitmen	WHL	34	4	4	8	18	6	3	4	7	0
2014–15	Calgary Hitmen	WHL	71	18	33	51	36	17	4	10	14	6
2015–16	Calgary Hitmen	WHL	59	19	52	71	46	5	0	0	0	6
2016–17	Lehigh Valley Phantoms	AHL	65	6	10	16	26	—	—	—	—	—
2016–17	Reading Royals	ECHL	1	0	0	0	0	—	—	—	—	—
2017–18	Lehigh Valley Phantoms	AHL	63	4	15	19	24	4	0	2	2	2
2018–19	Lehigh Valley Phantoms	AHL	15	0	2	2	0	—	—	—	—	—
2018–19	Bars Kazan	VHL	16	2	5	7	30	—	—	—	—	—
2019–20	Neftekhimik Nizhnekamsk	KHL	14	0	3	3	6	—	—	—	—	—
2019–20	CSK VVS Samara	VHL	13	3	4	7	4	—	—	—	—	—
2019–20	Bars Kazan	VHL	17	3	12	15	4	6	0	1	1	27
2020–21	Neftyanik Almetievsk	VHL	40	8	11	19	10	13	0	3	3	8
2021–22	Neftyanik Almetievsk	VHL	43	3	10	13	12	6	1	1	2	6
2022–23	Neftyanik Almetievsk	VHL	32	3	3	6	6	—	—	—	—	—
2023–24	Saryarka Karaganda	KAZ	30	11	14	25	42	—	—	—	—	—
2023–24	HC Tambov	VHL	17	2	9	11	6	7	0	2	2	0
2024–25	HC Shakhtyor Soligorsk	BHL	32	4	9	13	12	—	—	—	—	—
AHL totals			143	10	27	37	50	4	0	2	2	2
KHL totals			14	0	3	3	6	—	—	—	—	—

=== International ===
Year	Team	Event	Result	GP	G	A	Pts	PIM
2013	Russia	U17	2nd place, silver medalist(s)	6	3	4	7	2
2013	Russia	IH18	4th	4	1	2	3	0
2014	Russia	U18	5th	5	0	1	1	2
2016	Russia	WJC	2nd place, silver medalist(s)	7	1	2	3	0
Junior totals				22	5	9	14	4
