= Conner Bleackley =

Canadian ice hockey player (born 1996)

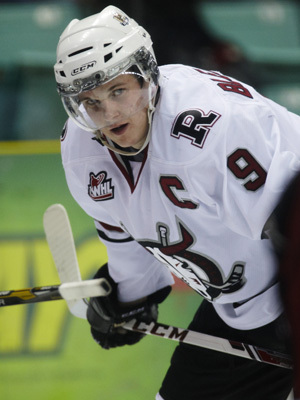
- Bleackley with the Red Deer Rebels in 2014
- Born: February 7, 1996 (age 30) High River, Alberta, Canada
- Height: 6 ft 0 in (183 cm)
- Weight: 192 lb (87 kg; 13 st 10 lb)
- Position: Centre
- Shot: Right
- Played for: Chicago Wolves; San Antonio Rampage; Texas Stars; Hartford Wolf Pack
- NHL draft: 23rd overall, 2014; Colorado Avalanche; 144th overall, 2016; St. Louis Blues
- Playing career: 2016–2023

Conner Bleackley (born February 7, 1996) is a former Canadian professional ice hockey player. He most recently played under contract with the Rapid City Rush in the ECHL. Bleackley was originally selected by the Colorado Avalanche in the first round (23rd overall) of the 2014 NHL entry draft, but was not signed to an entry-level contract, forcing him to re-enter the 2016 NHL entry draft, whereupon he was selected by the St. Louis Blues in the fifth round, 144th overall.

== Playing career ==
Bleackley was selected by the Red Deer Rebels in the 1st round (21st overall) of the 2012 WHL Bantam Draft from AAA Bantam club the Okotoks Oilers. After playing a further half season of midget hockey with the UFA Bisons of Strathmore in the Alberta Midget Hockey League he made his WHL debut in the 2011–12 season.

In only his second full season with the Red Deer Rebels he was named team captain as a 17-year-old for the 2013–14 season. Bleackley whilst showing positional versatility broke out offensively with the Rebels, producing a career high 29 goals and 68 points in 71 games. His outstanding play was further rewarded when he was chosen to skate in the 2014 CHL/NHL Top Prospects Game.

Bleackley draft stock rose and he finished the season rated as a top prospect who was viewed as a possible first round selection heading into the 2014 NHL Entry Draft before he was selected by the Colorado Avalanche. In Bleackley's first NHL training camp, the Avalanche were critical of his conditioning and promptly returned him to the WHL without an entry-level contract. In the 2014–15 season, Bleackley continued his scoring pace from previous seasons with 27 goals and 49 points in 51 games. On February 6, Bleackley suffered a strained groin, effectively ruling him out until the post-season in which Red Deer suffered a first-round exit.

During the off-season in the lead up to the 2015–16 season, Bleackley returned to the Avalanche rookie and training camp with ambition to earn an entry-level contract. With an improved physical performance, Bleackley was later returned for his final season of junior after competing in a pre-season game with the Avalanche. Prior to the commencement of the WHL season, Bleackley was relinquished of the captaincy by the Rebels, with coach Brent Sutter explaining the intent to focus on reaching his potential. With a guaranteed berth at the 2016 Memorial Cup, Bleackley struggled in the early stages of the year offensively. Bleackley picked up his offensive production and scored 41 points in 47 games before suffering a broken kneecap against the Everett Silvertips on January 23, 2016.

With the Avalanche intending not to offer Bleackley a contract, at the trade deadline on February 29, 2016, his rights were included in a trade alongside Alex Tanguay and fellow prospect Kyle Wood to the Arizona Coyotes in exchange for Mikkel Boedker. Citing his injury history, the Coyotes also declined to offer Bleackley a contract and instead chose to receive a compensatory second-round draft pick in the 2016 NHL entry draft; Bleackley was required to re-enter the same draft.

After his re-selection in the 2016 NHL entry draft by the St. Louis Blues, on July 2, 2016, Bleackley was finally signed to a three-year, entry-level contract.

Bleackley played with the Kansas City Mavericks in the 2016-2017 season. The following year in the 2017-2018 season, he played for the Tulsa Oilers.

At the conclusion of his entry-level contract, Bleackley was not tendered a qualifying offer by the Blues, releasing him to become a free agent on June 25, 2019. Unable to attract NHL interest, Bleackley was signed to a one-year ECHL contract with the Idaho Steelheads on September 3, 2019. He was invited to attend the Steelheads AHL affiliate, the Texas Stars training camp prior to the 2019–20 season. On October 5, 2019 after a successful camp he was signed to a professional try-out contract with Texas to remain on the roster. Bleackley opened the season with the Stars, scoring 2 goals in a 5-3 defeat to the Manitoba Moose on October 5, 2019. Showing initial success with the Stars, Bleackley remained with the club through 10 games, registering 5 points, before he was returned to the Idaho Steelheads. Bleackley compiled 13 points through 18 games with the Steelheads before he was dealt in a three-way trade to the Maine Mariners on January 14, 2020. Bleackley played well with Maine over the last 15 games of the 2019–20 season, recording 5 goals and 5 assists.

On January 2, 2021, Bleackley continued his career in the ECHL, signing a contract to play with the Allen Americans. In the 2020–21 season, Bleackley struggled to contribute offensively, posting 4 goals and 9 points through 32 regular season games. On April 13, 2021, he was traded by the Americans to the Indy Fuel to complete an earlier transaction. He did not report and feature with the Fuel.

As a free agent in the following summer, Bleackley opted to continue in the ECHL, returning to former club the Maine Mariners on September 29, 2021. In 2023, Bleackley joined the Rapid City Rush.

== International play ==
As a 17-year-old he was chosen to compete with the team representing Canada Pacific at the World U-17 Hockey Challenge, and as an 18-year-old he helped Team Canada capture the bronze medal at the 2014 IIHF World U18 Championships.

== Career statistics ==
=== Regular season and playoffs ===
			Regular season					Playoffs
Season	Team	League	GP	G	A	Pts	PIM	GP	G	A	Pts	PIM
2011–12	UFA Bisons	AMHL	26	13	17	30	41	2	0	0	0	0
2011–12	Red Deer Rebels	WHL	16	2	0	2	6	—	—	—	—	—
2012–13	Red Deer Rebels	WHL	66	9	9	18	28	9	2	1	3	0
2013–14	Red Deer Rebels	WHL	71	29	39	68	48	1	0	1	1	0
2014–15	Red Deer Rebels	WHL	51	27	22	49	49	5	1	1	2	4
2015–16	Red Deer Rebels	WHL	55	13	33	46	49	—	—	—	—	—
2016–17	Chicago Wolves	AHL	45	2	8	10	8	2	0	0	0	5
2016–17	Missouri Mavericks	ECHL	14	7	10	17	14	—	—	—	—	—
2017–18	Tulsa Oilers	ECHL	40	19	19	38	82	—	—	—	—	—
2017–18	Chicago Wolves	AHL	7	0	1	1	2	—	—	—	—	—
2017–18	San Antonio Rampage	AHL	13	1	0	1	7	—	—	—	—	—
2018–19	San Antonio Rampage	AHL	57	5	11	16	35	—	—	—	—	—
2019–20	Texas Stars	AHL	10	3	2	5	6	—	—	—	—	—
2019–20	Idaho Steelheads	ECHL	18	4	9	13	4	—	—	—	—	—
2019–20	Maine Mariners	ECHL	15	5	5	10	14	—	—	—	—	—
2019–20	Hartford Wolf Pack	AHL	1	0	0	0	2	—	—	—	—	—
2020–21	Allen Americans	ECHL	32	4	5	9	17	—	—	—	—	—
2021–22	Maine Mariners	ECHL	66	11	15	26	38	6	1	1	2	10
2022–23	Maine Mariners	ECHL	32	4	8	12	19	—	—	—	—	—
2023–24	Rapid City Rush	ECHL	13	0	3	3	2	—	—	—	—	—
AHL totals			133	11	22	33	60	2	0	0	0	5

=== International ===
Year	Team	Event	Result	GP	G	A	Pts	PIM
2013	Canada Pacific	U17	5th	5	3	1	4	12
2014	Canada	U18	3rd place, bronze medalist(s)	7	1	1	2	4
Junior totals				12	4	2	6	16

== Awards and honours ==
Honours	Year
CHL
CHL/NHL Top Prospects Game (Team Cherry)	2014
International
World U-17 Hockey Challenge (Canada Pacific)	2013
IIHF World U18 Championship Bronze Medal	2014

Awards and achievements
Preceded by Nathan MacKinnon	Colorado Avalanche first-round draft pick 2014	Succeeded by Mikko Rantanen
