= Jake Virtanen =

Canadian ice hockey player (born 1996)

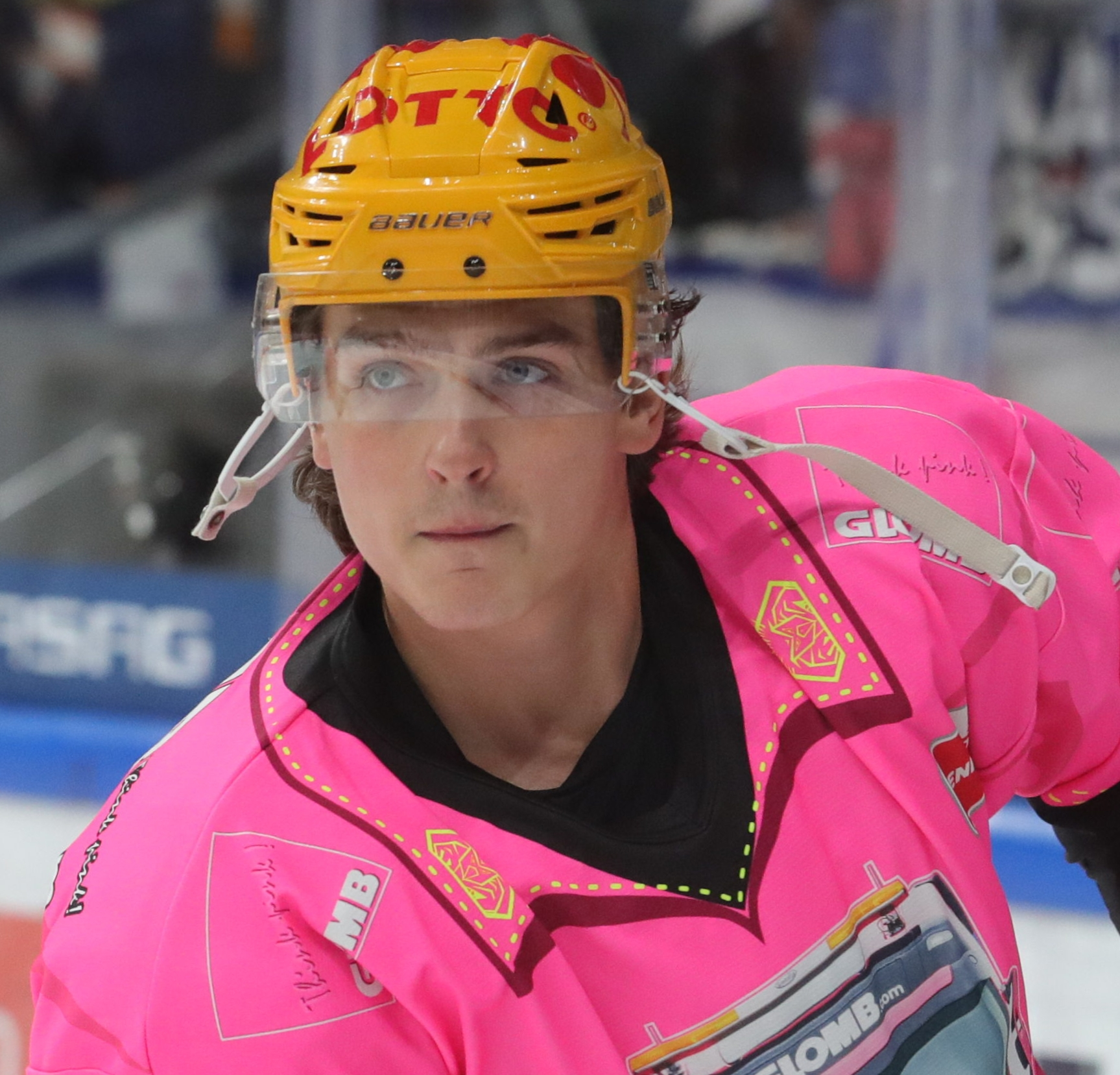
- Virtanen with the Fischtown Pinguins in 2023
- Born: August 17, 1996 (age 30) New Westminster, British Columbia, Canada
- Height: 6 ft 1 in (185 cm)
- Weight: 226 lb (103 kg; 16 st 2 lb)
- Position: Right wing
- Shoots: Right
- Slovak team Former teams: HK Dukla Michalovce; Vancouver Canucks; Spartak Moscow; Fischtown Pinguins; Iserlohn Roosters
- NHL draft: 6th overall, 2014; Vancouver Canucks
- Playing career: 2015–present

Jacob Virtanen (born August 17, 1996) is a Finnish-Canadian professional ice hockey player who currently plays for HK Dukla Michalovce of the Slovak Extraliga. Virtanen was drafted by the Vancouver Canucks sixth overall in the 2014 NHL entry draft and played for the NHL team from 2015 to 2021.

Virtanen played junior hockey with the Calgary Hitmen of the Western Hockey League (WHL) and has represented Canada five times in international competition at the 2013 World U-17 Hockey Challenge, 2013 U-18 Junior World Cup, 2014 IIHF World U18 Championships, 2015 IIHF World U20 Championships and 2016 IIHF World U20 Championships.

== Early life ==
Virtanen was born August 17, 1996, in New Westminster, British Columbia, and spent his first 12 years living in Langley, British Columbia, before settling in nearby Abbotsford. Growing up, Virtanen attended Fraser Middle School Hockey Academy where he played rugby through grade 7 and 8. In eighth grade, he helped the team win the Fraser Valley 7s and the full-on league for Grade 8 15-a-side teams. He caught the attention of his physical education teacher who, after convincing him to continue playing rugby seriously, personally trained him on the rules of the sport. Virtanen's middle school fed directly into the W.A. Fraser Skills academy, which he also attended along with Yale Hockey Academy. While attending Yale Secondary School which worked with the hockey Academy, Virtanen was praised for his wrist shot from the executive director Billy Wilms. He said in an interview that "Jake stood out as a kid who you just knew was going to be a pro, in grade 9...His wrist shot was harder than my slap shot when we did skill testing...Jake steps up and fires an 81 with a snapper, and he was only in grade 9."

His father, Rainer, immigrated from Finland and his mother is French Canadian. Virtanen acquired jus sanguinis Finnish citizenship through his father and has a tattoo of the Finnish coat of arms on his right forearm.

== Playing career ==
=== Minor ===
Growing up in Abbotsford, Virtanen began his minor hockey career there. As a member of the Abbotsford Hawks at the bantam level in 2010–11, Virtanen scored 68 goals and 117 points in 59 games. As a 15-year-old, Virtanen spent most of the 2011–12 season in midget hockey with the Fraser Valley Bruins where he scored 39 points in 39 games and recorded 120 penalty minutes.

=== Junior ===
The Western Hockey League (WHL)'s Calgary Hitmen selected Virtanen with the first overall pick at the 2011 WHL Bantam Draft. He appeared in nine games for the Hitmen during the 2011–12 season and was a regular for Calgary in 2012–13. Virtanen scored 16 goals and 34 points in 62 games and began to establish himself as a highly ranked prospect for the 2014 NHL entry draft.

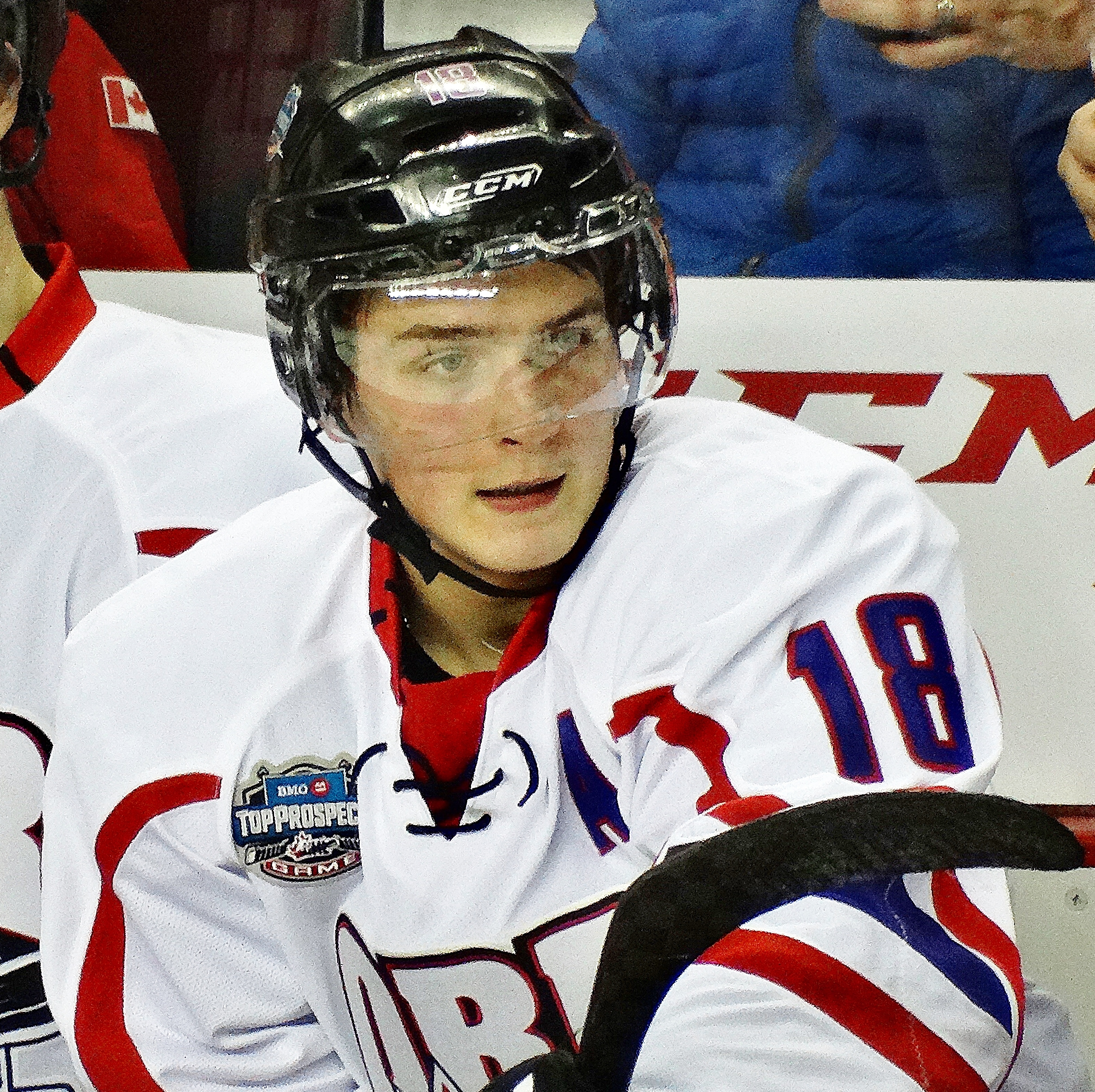
Virtanen at the 2014 CHL Top Prospects Game.

Returning to Calgary for his second full junior season, Virtanen nearly tripled his goal scoring total from the previous season and finished with 45 on the year. He added 26 assists to finish with 71 points. The NHL Central Scouting Bureau ranked Virtanen as the ninth-best North American skater for the 2014 Draft at its midseason ranking and he played in the CHL/NHL Top Prospects Game.

Virtanen moved up three spots in NHL Central Scouting's year-end ranking and entered the Draft ranked sixth among North American skaters. The Hockey News projected Virtanen to be a "pure goal scorer" in the NHL and ranked him 11th overall in its draft preview. The magazine praised both his physical ability and the quality shot, but added that he is not known as a playmaker and that his "hockey sense" required development. He had shoulder surgery in May 2014 that was expected to sideline him until December 2014.

=== Professional ===
==== Vancouver Canucks ====
Virtanen was selected 6th overall in the 2014 NHL entry draft by the Vancouver Canucks. He was the first British Columbia born player selected in the first round by the Canucks since Cam Neely in 1983. On July 25, 2014, Virtanen announced he had signed an entry-level contract with the Canucks via Twitter. When posting about his deal he said,"such an honour to sign with the Vancouver Canucks! I'd like to thank everybody who's helped me get to this point especially my family!!" He returned to the Hitmen for his final year of major junior hockey before being reassigned to the Canucks' American Hockey League (AHL) affiliate, the Utica Comets, following their WHL Playoff elimination. Virtanen immediately joined the Comets' 2015 Calder Cup playoffs lineup on May 18, where he made his professional debut during Game 6 of the Western Conference Semifinals. Following the 2–1 loss to the Oklahoma City Barons, he said it was "a great experience and exciting time with a great group of guys. The guys up here are a lot bigger and the game is faster. The game was exciting and the fans were amazing up here. The atmosphere in the rink is incredible." He continued to play with the Comets during their postseason push, eventually recording his first professional assist on a Sven Bärtschi goal in Game 3 of the Western Conference Finals against the Grand Rapids Griffins.

Following his stint in the AHL, Virtanen was invited to participate in the Canucks 2015 training camp prior to the 2015–16 season. He impressed during the camp by recording two goals and two assists in six pre-season games and was subsequently named to their opening night roster. His NHL debut came days later when he was subbed in as a replacement for Jared McCann on October 13 prior to the Canucks contest with the Los Angeles Kings. He went scoreless in his debut but later recording his first NHL point (an assist) on a Derek Dorsett goal in a 5–1 win against the Montreal Canadiens. On November 1, 2015, it was announced Virtanen and McCann had made the Canucks' team past their nine-game "tryout" period which would have sent them back to juniors without wasting a year of their contract. Following this decision, Virtanen, playing alongside Brandon Sutter, scored his first career NHL goal in a 3–1 win over the Philadelphia Flyers. After recording one goal and four points in 19 games with the Canucks, he was reassigned to the Comets on a condition stint. He played two games with the team before being loaned to the Canadian national junior team for the 2016 World Junior Ice Hockey Championships (WJC). During the WJC, Virtanen recorded one point in five games and took three penalties in the quarterfinal game against Finland. He responded to his online hate from fans saying, "I was more disappointed in losing the game. We went over there to win a gold medal and we didn't get it. Obviously I want to take a little bit of the responsibility for that." Upon returning to North America, Virtanen re-joined the Canucks and ended his rookie season with 13 points in 55 games.

Virtanen was invited to the Canucks training camp prior to the 2016–17 season but arrived overweight. He was instructed to maintain a weight of 213 over the offseason but upon arrival weighed in at 231 pounds. He played 10 games with the Canucks before being reassigned to the Utica Comets, where he remained for the majority of the season. On November 13, he was recalled to the Canucks, but three days later, he was sent back down again—up until then, he had registered only 7 goals and 7 assists in 65 games with the Canucks. While in Utica, Virtanen recorded 19 points 65 games while often playing a bottom-six role. His development in Utica earned him an invite to the Canucks training camp leading up to the 2017–18 season where he made the roster for opening night. He would spend the entirety of the season in the NHL and record 20 points in 75 games. On July 25, 2018, the Canucks re-signed Virtanen to a two-year $1.25 million contract while GM Jim Benning praised his "physical presence and speed."

Prior to the start of the 2018–19 season, TSN 1040 radio hosts Jason Brough and Mike Halford vowed to shotgun a beer every time Virtanen scored during the season, deeming it "Shotgun Jake." Following his first goal of the season in a 5–2 win over the Calgary Flames, fans took to Twitter to tweet videos of themselves shotgunning beer using the hashtag #ShotgunJake. Although his season started off well with a career-high 22 points through 58 games, he suffered a fractured rib during a game against the Anaheim Ducks in February and remained out of the lineup for one month.

Leading up to the 2019–20 season, Virtanen attended the Canucks training camp where he was relegated to the third skating group consisting of mostly AHLers. When questioned, Canucks head coach Travis Green said there were "goals" that weren't met during the offseason. Green admitted that Virtanen would stay in the Canucks lineup but was not expected to have a large role during the season. In spite of his rocky start, Virtanen recorded a career-high 36 points in 69 games during the shortened regular season. As the NHL began to enter Stage 2 of their Return to Play process, Virtanen was filmed attending a night club called Celebrities Nightclub in Vancouver which the Canucks said was addressed internally. As the league readied to resume play for the post-season, Virtanen again unimpressed Canucks coaches during training camp and was scratched for their first game against the Minnesota Wild in the Qualifying Round. He returned to their lineup for Game 2 along with Loui Eriksson as a replacement for forwards Tyler Toffoli and Adam Gaudette and helped lead the team to a 4–3 win over Minnesota. In Vancouver's first–round series versus the St. Louis Blues, Virtanen scored a goal and an assist in Game 5 to help the Canucks comeback from a 3–1 deficit and win the game 4–3, giving Vancouver a 3–2 lead in the series, which they won in six games. During the second round against the Vegas Golden Knights, Virtanen helped push the team to a Game 7 elimination game after recording the game-winning goal in Game 6. Following their elimination in Game 7, he ended the postseason with three points in 16 games.

On October 22, 2020, Virtanen signed a two-year, $5.1 million contract with the Canucks. In the pandemic delayed 2020–21 season, Virtanen struggled to contribute offensively with the Canucks producing a career low 5 goals in 38 regular season games.

Virtanen was placed on leave by the Canucks on May 1, 2021, and had his $3.4 million contract bought out by his hometown team in July, following sexual misconduct allegations. He was charged with sexual assault in January 2022 following an investigation by the Vancouver Police Department. The incident occurred on September 26, 2017, and on July 26, 2022, he was later cleared of all charges by jury. On July 25, 2021, Virtanen was placed on unconditional waivers by the Canucks for the purpose of a buyout from the remaining year of his contract.

==== Russia ====
Remaining as a free agent over the off-season and with his sexual misconduct allegations pending, Virtanen was unable to secure a contract in the NHL. With the 2021–22 season underway abroad, on September 7, 2021, Virtanen was signed to a one-year contract with Russian club, Spartak Moscow of the Kontinental Hockey League (KHL). On March 7, 2022, Virtanen was released from his contract with Spartak Moscow due to a "breach of contract" during a period where multiple foreign KHL players had similarly left the league after the 2022 Russian invasion of Ukraine that February.

==== Switzerland ====
On September 19, 2022, attempting to make a return to the NHL, Virtanen signed a professional tryout agreement with the Edmonton Oilers. After attending the Oilers training camp and pre-season, Virtanen was released on October 6, 2022. Opting to return to Europe, Virtanen agreed to join second tier Swiss club EHC Visp of the SL, signing a two-year contract on November 6, 2022. Virtanen got into an altercation with a teammate in January 2023, and was dismissed from the team in February 2023 after a player on his team told management an ultimatum of either keeping him or Virtanen.

==== Germany ====
A free agent, Virtanen quickly signed to a contract with German club Fischtown Pinguins of the DEL, for the remainder of the 2022–23 season with the option of an extra year on February 14, 2023.

On May 30, 2024, Virtanen opted to stay in Germany and signed a one-year contract with the Iserlohn Roosters. Virtanen recorded 19 points in 46 games for the Roosters.

==== Slovakia ====
On July 30, 2025, HK Dukla Michalovce of the Slovak Extraliga announced that it had signed Virtanen to a one-year contract.

== International play ==
Medal record

Representing Canada

Ice hockey

IIHF World U18 Championship
Bronze medal – third place	2014 Finland	

Ivan Hlinka Memorial Tournament
Gold medal – first place	2013 Czech Republic/Slovakia	

IIHF World U20 Championship
Gold medal – first place	2015 Canada	

Making his first appearance with the Canadian national team prior to the 2013–14 season, Virtanen joined the under-18 squad for the 2012 Ivan Hlinka Memorial Tournament. Playing in a grinding role, Virtanen recorded one assist in five games as Canada won its sixth consecutive gold medal at the event, which culminated with a 4–0 victory over the United States.

A first round exit from the WHL playoffs by Calgary allowed Virtanen to make a second appearance with the national team as he played in the 2014 IIHF World U18 Championships. He tied for the team lead in scoring with six points to help lead the Canadians to a bronze medal at the event.

At the 2016 IIHF World Junior Championships in Helsinki, Virtanen had one assist in five games and led Canada in penalty minutes at ten. Canada was eliminated by the host Finland in the quarterfinal.

== Personal life ==
=== Sexual assault allegations and acquittal ===
On May 1, 2021, Virtanen was placed on leave by the Canucks following a sexual assault allegation made by a woman identified in court documents as "M.S.". Virtanen and M.S. met at the 2017 Calgary Stampede and stayed in touch via text messages throughout the summer of 2017. She claimed that on September 26, 2017, she came to Vancouver for a photoshoot and to visit friends. She agreed to get together with Virtanen while in Vancouver, and he subsequently picked her up from a friend's house in North Vancouver and drove her to a Vancouver hotel. The woman claimed Virtanen then "used his body weight and superior strength" to render her powerless. "Virtanen proceeded to push open the plaintiff's legs and to have sexual intercourse with the plaintiff without the plaintiff's consent," her lawsuit reads. The Canucks later released a statement remarking that "their organization does not accept sexual misconduct of any kind, and that the claims as reported were being treated very seriously."

The alleged victim claims she finally decided to come forward after seeing others do so on Twitter. In a response filed by Virtanen in a British Columbia court, he acknowledged having sex with the woman, but claimed he had not forced himself on her and that she consented "through her words and conduct". Virtanen claimed M.S. gave him no verbal or physical indication that she did not want to engage in sexual activity. M.S. testified in court that she said "no" and physically pushed Virtanen off her.

After the Vancouver Police Department launched an investigation in May 2021, Virtanen was charged with one count of sexual assault by the British Columbia Prosecution Service in January 2022. The trial began on July 18, 2022, at the BC Supreme Court in Vancouver. On July 26, 2022, a 12-person jury found Virtanen not guilty of the charge. Virtanen expressed relief at the verdict, stating "I am glad the truth has come to light", while adding that he was eager to resume his NHL career.

=== Engagement ===
In February 2024, he reported via his Instagram account an engagement to his partner, Emily.

== Career statistics ==
=== Regular season and playoffs ===
			Regular season					Playoffs
Season	Team	League	GP	G	A	Pts	PIM	GP	G	A	Pts	PIM
2010–11	Abbotsford Hawks	PCBHL	59	68	49	117	—	—	—	—	—	—
2011–12	Fraser Valley Bruins	BCMML	39	17	22	39	120	—	—	—	—	—
2011–12	Calgary Hitmen	WHL	9	3	1	4	4	5	0	0	0	4
2012–13	Calgary Hitmen	WHL	62	16	18	34	67	15	2	4	6	27
2013–14	Calgary Hitmen	WHL	71	45	26	71	100	6	1	3	4	4
2014–15	Calgary Hitmen	WHL	50	21	31	52	82	14	5	8	13	28
2014–15	Utica Comets	AHL	—	—	—	—	—	10	0	1	1	6
2015–16	Vancouver Canucks	NHL	55	7	6	13	45	—	—	—	—	—
2015–16	Utica Comets	AHL	2	0	0	0	0	—	—	—	—	—
2016–17	Vancouver Canucks	NHL	10	0	1	1	2	—	—	—	—	—
2016–17	Utica Comets	AHL	65	9	10	19	48	—	—	—	—	—
2017–18	Vancouver Canucks	NHL	75	10	10	20	46	—	—	—	—	—
2018–19	Vancouver Canucks	NHL	70	15	10	25	44	—	—	—	—	—
2019–20	Vancouver Canucks	NHL	69	18	18	36	41	16	2	1	3	25
2020–21	Vancouver Canucks	NHL	38	5	0	5	41	—	—	—	—	—
2021–22	Spartak Moscow	KHL	36	9	7	16	24	—	—	—	—	—
2022–23	EHC Visp	SL	21	14	11	25	44	—	—	—	—	—
2022–23	Fischtown Pinguins	DEL	8	1	1	2	2	8	1	1	2	10
2023–24	Fischtown Pinguins	DEL	36	6	15	21	27	2	0	0	0	0
2024–25	Iserlohn Roosters	DEL	46	6	13	19	29	—	—	—	—	—
NHL totals			317	55	45	100	219	16	2	1	3	25
KHL totals			36	9	7	16	24	—	—	—	—	—

=== International ===
Year	Team	Event	Result	GP	G	A	Pts	PIM
2013	Canada Pacific	U17	5th	5	5	2	7	8
2013	Canada	IH18	1st place, gold medalist(s)	5	0	1	1	4
2014	Canada	WJC18	3rd place, bronze medalist(s)	7	3	3	6	10
2015	Canada	WJC	1st place, gold medalist(s)	7	1	3	4	4
2016	Canada	WJC	6th	5	0	1	1	10
Junior totals				24	9	9	18	26

Awards and achievements
Preceded by Hunter Shinkaruk	Vancouver Canucks first-round draft pick 2014	Succeeded by Jared McCann
