= Sonny Milano =

American ice hockey player (born 1996)

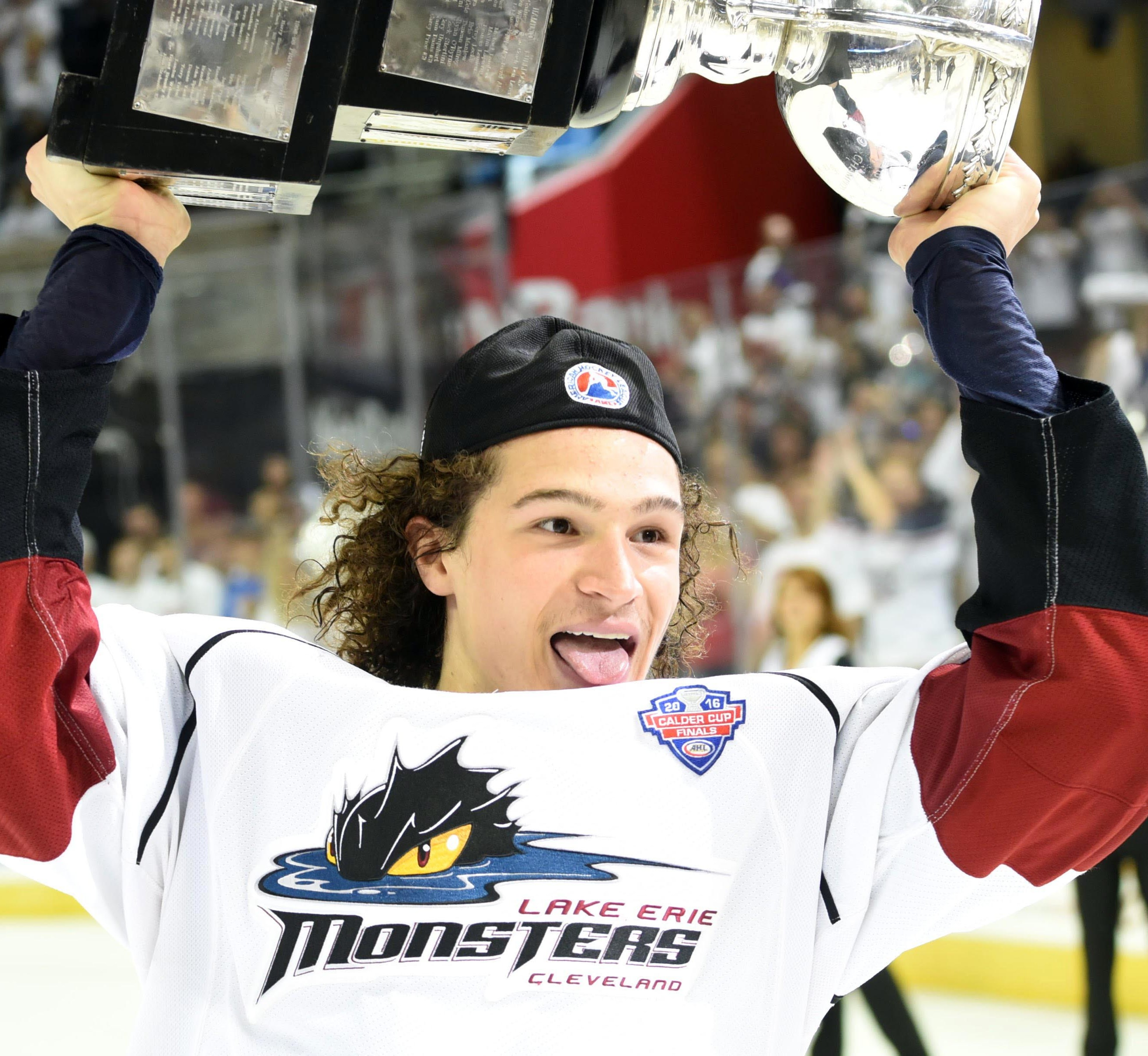
- Milano with the Lake Erie Monsters in 2016
- Born: May 12, 1996 (age 30) Massapequa, New York, U.S.
- Height: 6 ft 0 in (183 cm)
- Weight: 205 lb (93 kg; 14 st 9 lb)
- Position: Winger
- Shoots: Left
- NL team Former teams: SC Bern; Columbus Blue Jackets; Anaheim Ducks; Washington Capitals
- National team: United States
- NHL draft: 16th overall, 2014; Columbus Blue Jackets
- Playing career: 2015–present

Frank "Sonny" Milano (born May 12, 1996) is an American professional ice hockey player who is a winger for SC Bern of the National League (NL) in Switzerland. He was selected by the Columbus Blue Jackets in the first round, 16th overall, of the 2014 NHL entry draft.

== Early life ==
Milano was born on May 12, 1996, to parents Frank and Caroline Milano in Massapequa, New York. Growing up, Milano was a fan of the New York Islanders and his favorite player was Ziggy Palffy. He began skating at the age of two after seeing his sister skate during her figure skating lessons.

== Playing career ==
Growing up in New York, Milano played in the 2009 Quebec International Pee-Wee Hockey Tournament with the New York Rangers minor ice hockey team. He left home at the age of 15 after being recruited by Cleveland Barons coaching director Tim Alexander to play for the Barons' Midget Minor Tier 1 team. Milano spent his freshman year at the Portledge School in Locust Valley before moving to Rocky River High School while playing with the Barons. During the 2011–12 season with the Barons, Milano led the entire Tier 1 Elite Hockey League with 44 goals and 43 assists for 87 points through 40 games. He subsequently tried out for the USA Hockey National Team Development Program in January 2012 but failed to make the team.

=== Junior ===
Milano was rated as a top prospect who was widely projected to be a first round selection in the 2014 NHL Entry Draft. He trained with the USA Hockey National Team Development Program team during the 2012–13 and 2013–14 seasons, and was invited to participate in the 2013 CCM/USA Hockey All-American Prospects Game.

Milano was committed to play for the Boston College Eagles men's ice hockey team in the Hockey East Association. However, on August 16, 2014, Eagles' head coach Jerry York announced Milano had advised the team of his intention to sign a professional contract with the Blue Jackets, thus forgoing his college eligibility. During the 2014–2015 season, Milano was playing for the Plymouth Whalers in the OHL. On September 11, 2014, Milano signed a three-year entry-level contract with the Blue Jackets.

=== Professional ===
==== Columbus Blue Jackets ====
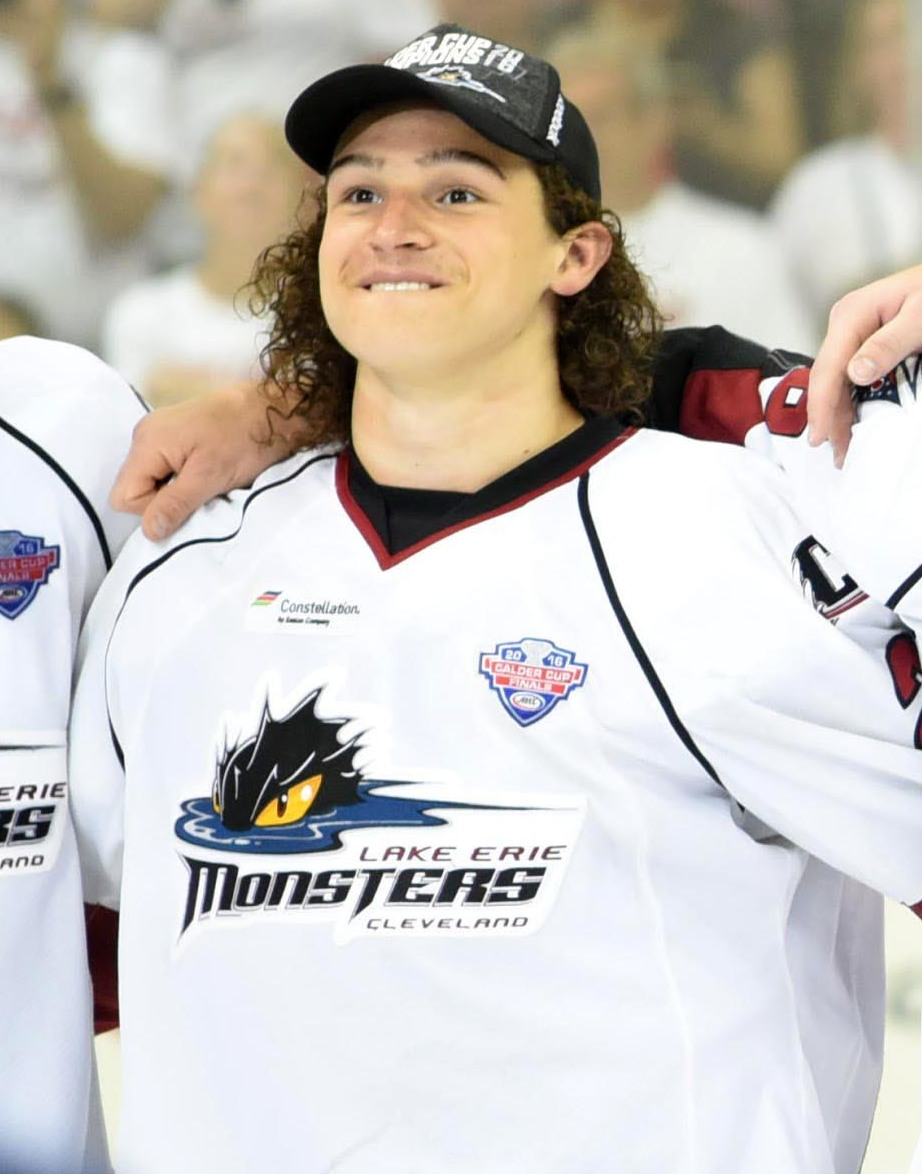
Milano during the 2016 Calder Cup playoffs.

On March 23, 2015, Milano concluded his OHL career and was assigned to the Blue Jackets American Hockey League (AHL) affiliate, the Springfield Falcons. He immediately made his professional debut with the Falcons and recorded five assists through 10 games. Milano participated in the Blue Jackets training and development camp before being re-assigned to their new AHL affiliate, the Lake Erie Monsters, for the 2015–16 season. Upon joining the Monsters, Milano tallied 12 goals and 27 points through 48 games before being recalled to the NHL level on an emergency basis on March 30, 2016. He scored his first career NHL assist in his second game on April 2 to help the Blue Jackets beat the Carolina Hurricanes 5–1. Milano remained with the Blue Jackets for three games before returning to the AHL for the remainder of the season. He finished the 2015–16 regular season with 14 goals and 31 points through 54 games. He finished tied for fifth in goals and sixth in points for the Monsters. Milano was an important player for the Monsters in their 2016 Calder Cup playoffs push. He accumulated four goals and four assists for eight points through 17 games as the Monsters clinched the Calder Cup.

Following their Calder Cup win, Milano returned to the Blue Jackets' 2016 development and training camp prior to the 2016–17 season. Although he was originally assigned to their newly named AHL affiliate, the Cleveland Monsters, to begin the season, Milano was recalled to the NHL on October 21. At the time of the recall, he had accumulated one goal through two games. He did not play during his callup and was returned to the AHL for two more games before returning to the NHL on November 4. Milano made his season debut on November 9, playing on the second line alongside center Boone Jenner and right wing Cam Atkinson. Despite the numerous call ups, Milano ranked second among all Cleveland players with .33 goals per game in all situations through six games played. By February 21, Milano ranked second in team scoring with 11 goals and 14 assists for 25 points while also tying Markus Hännikäinen for most goals among active Monsters players. His production continued to steadily increase as the season continued and he added five goals and 13 assists by April. As a result of his play, Milano earned his third call up of the season on April 3. Milano played in one game with the Blue Jackets before returning to the AHL level on April 5. He earned two more call ups on April 9 and 15 as the Monsters concluded their regular season. Milano finished his second professional season leading the Monsters in points and assists with 18 goals and 29 assists for 47 points. While with the Blue Jackets, Milano made his Stanley Cup playoffs debut on April 16 during their first-round series against the Pittsburgh Penguins. His debut came during Game 3 as he replaced a suspended Matt Calvert.

After spending the majority of two seasons in the AHL, Milano played a career-high 55 games at the NHL level during the 2017–18 season. For the first time, he made the Blue Jackets roster directly out of training camp and immediately scored his first career NHL goal on October 6, 2017, in a 5-0 shutout of the Islanders. He continued to produce and quickly accumulated four goals in his first three games of the season. As the season progressed, coach John Tortorella played Milano on the left wing on the third line where he averaged around 15 minutes a game and earned time on the power play. Despite his early success, Milano was sent back down to the Cleveland Monsters on December 3, 2017, after registering 10 points in 24 games. Coach Tortorella later explained that he was re-assigned due to an overflow of forwards in the lineup, not as a result of his play. Milano recorded two assists through two games with the Monsters before being recalled back to the Blue Jackets on December 9. After continuing to go pointless in the NHL through the following four games, Milano was returned to the Monsters on December 22. However, as injuries quickly began to befall the Blue Jackets lineup, Milano and forward Jordan Schroeder were recalled to the NHL on December 26 an emergency basis. During this recall, Milano recorded his second two-goal game of the season in a loss to the Ottawa Senators on December 29. His overall play earned him an extended stay in the Blue Jackets lineup as he replaced Boone Jenner on the left wing of the second line. However, he shortly thereafter suffered a torn oblique muscle during a game against the Toronto Maple Leafs on January 8 and was expected to miss four to six weeks to recover. At the time of the injury, Milano had recorded eight goals and five assists for 13 points through 35 games. Once Milano was activated off of injured reserve on February 16, he was re-assigned to the AHL level. This would be Milano's last assignment as he was recalled to the NHL on February 26 and stayed with the team for the remainder of the season. He subsequently finished the 2017–18 AHL season with two goals and three assists for five points and four penalty minutes through nine contests. Upon returning to the Blue Jackets, Milano was often paired with centre Nick Foligno and right winger Oliver Bjorkstrand. However, Foligno was replaced with Brandon Dubinsky once he suffered a long-term injury in late March. As the Blue Jackets clinched a berth in the 2018 Stanley Cup playoffs, Milano finished the regular season with 14 goals and 22 points in 55 games. Despite this, he was made a healthy scratch for Game 1 of the Stanley Cup first round against the Washington Capitals to make room for Foligno's return. Milano made his post-season debut in Game 2 as a replacement for an injured Alexander Wennberg. Milano played three games with the Blue Jackets during the postseason, averaging 6:45 minutes of ice time but recording no points, shots, or shot attempts.

For the second straight season, Milano was named to the Blue Jackets' opening night roster prior to the start of the 2018–19 season. However, after scoring only one goal in eight games for the Blue Jackets, Milano returned to the Monsters for the remainder of the season. Injuries severely limited Milano's playing ability with the Monsters and he finished the season with 11 goals and 13 assists for 24 points through 27 games. At the conclusion of the season, Milano accepted the Blue Jackets' qualifying offer to remain with the team through the 2019–20 season. During the 2019 offseason, Milano switched trainers and stated he felt more confident in his game. After making the teams' opening night roster for the 2019-20 season, Milano played his first NHL game in 349 days. He recorded five goals and 13 assists for 18 points through 46 games with the Blue Jackets before being traded to the Anaheim Ducks in exchange for Devin Shore on February 24, 2020.

==== Anaheim Ducks and Calgary Flames ====
Upon joining the Anaheim Ducks, Milano recorded two goals and three assists through nine games before the season was paused on March 12 due to the COVID-19 pandemic. On July 28, 2020, the Ducks signed Milano to a two-year, $3.4 million contract extension. Once the 2020–21 NHL season began, Milano was placed on the Ducks' top line alongside Ryan Getzlaf and Rickard Rakell. However, they struggled to produce and only earned one point among them through the team's first four games. Milano shortly thereafter suffered another injury and he was assigned to the Ducks' AHL affiliate, the San Diego Gulls, on a Long-Term Injury Conditioning Loan on February 17.

At the conclusion of the 2021–22 season and his contract with the Ducks, despite establishing new offensive career highs, Milano was not tendered a qualifying offer and was released as a free agent. After going un-signed over the summer, Milano opted to join the Calgary Flames on a professional tryout contract to attend training camp. He participated in the pre-season with the Flames before he was released from his tryout without a contract on September 27, 2022.

==== Washington Capitals ====
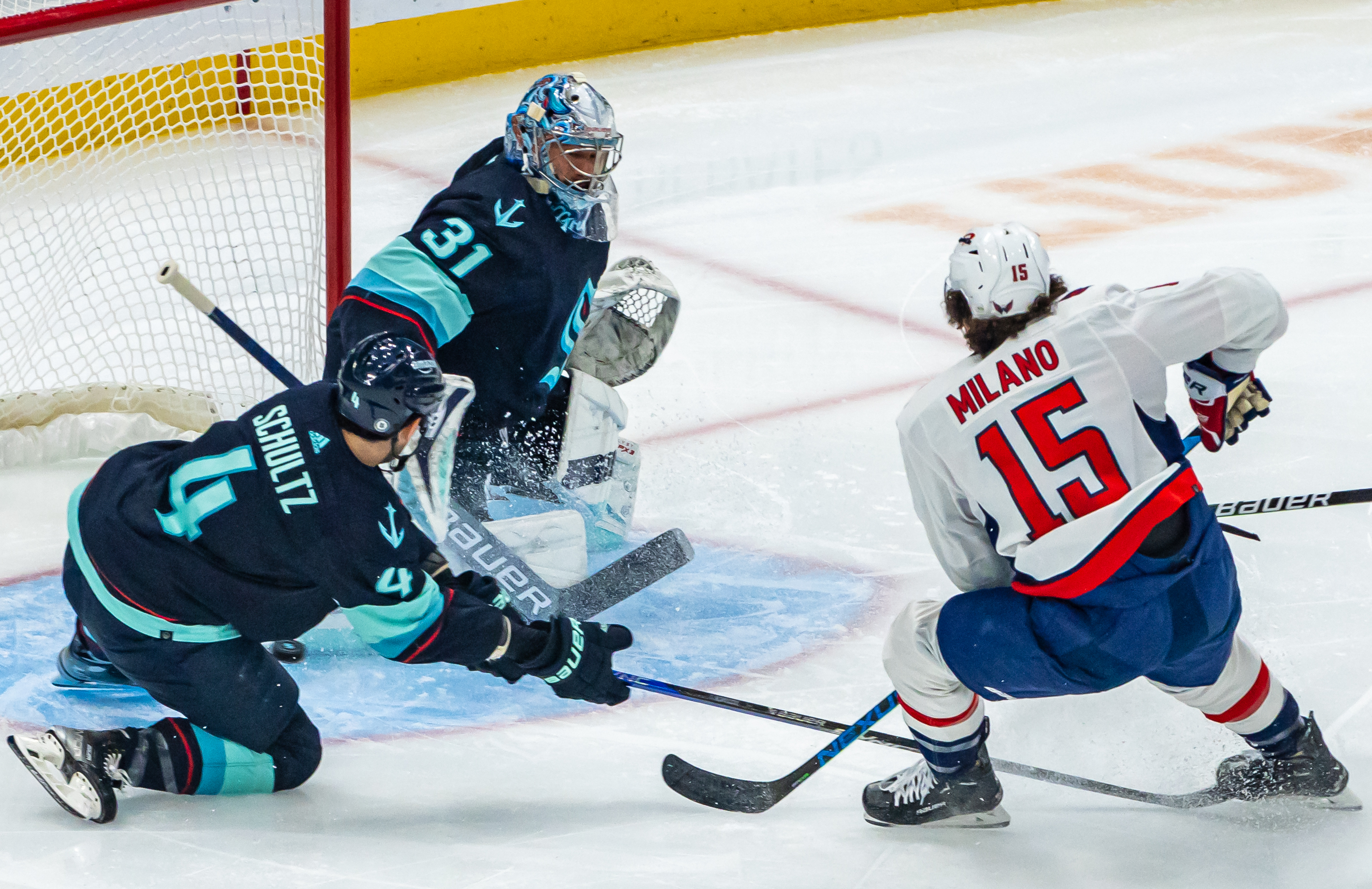
Milano (right) during a game against the Seattle Kraken in 2022.

Beginning the 2022–23 season without a club, Milano was belatedly signed to a one-year, $750,000 contract with the Washington Capitals on October 17, 2022. He was immediately placed on waivers and upon clearing was assigned by the Capitals to AHL affiliate, the Hershey Bears. Milano recorded three points through five games with Hershey before being recalled to the NHL level on November 2, 2022. During this call-up, Milano collected a primary assist in his 200th career NHL game as the Capitals fell 4–1 to the Pittsburgh Penguins on November 8. As he became a mainstay in the lineup, Milano found a place on a line with Dylan Strome and Nicolas Aubé-Kubel. He was later placed on a line with veterans Tom Wilson and Nicklas Bäckström. By early February, Milano ranked fourth on the team in goals and sixth in scoring since his NHL debut. He ranked third on the team with eight even-strength goals and had also recorded 14 assists through 40 games. As a result of his performance, Milano signed a three-year contract extension with an annual salary cap hit of $1.9 million.

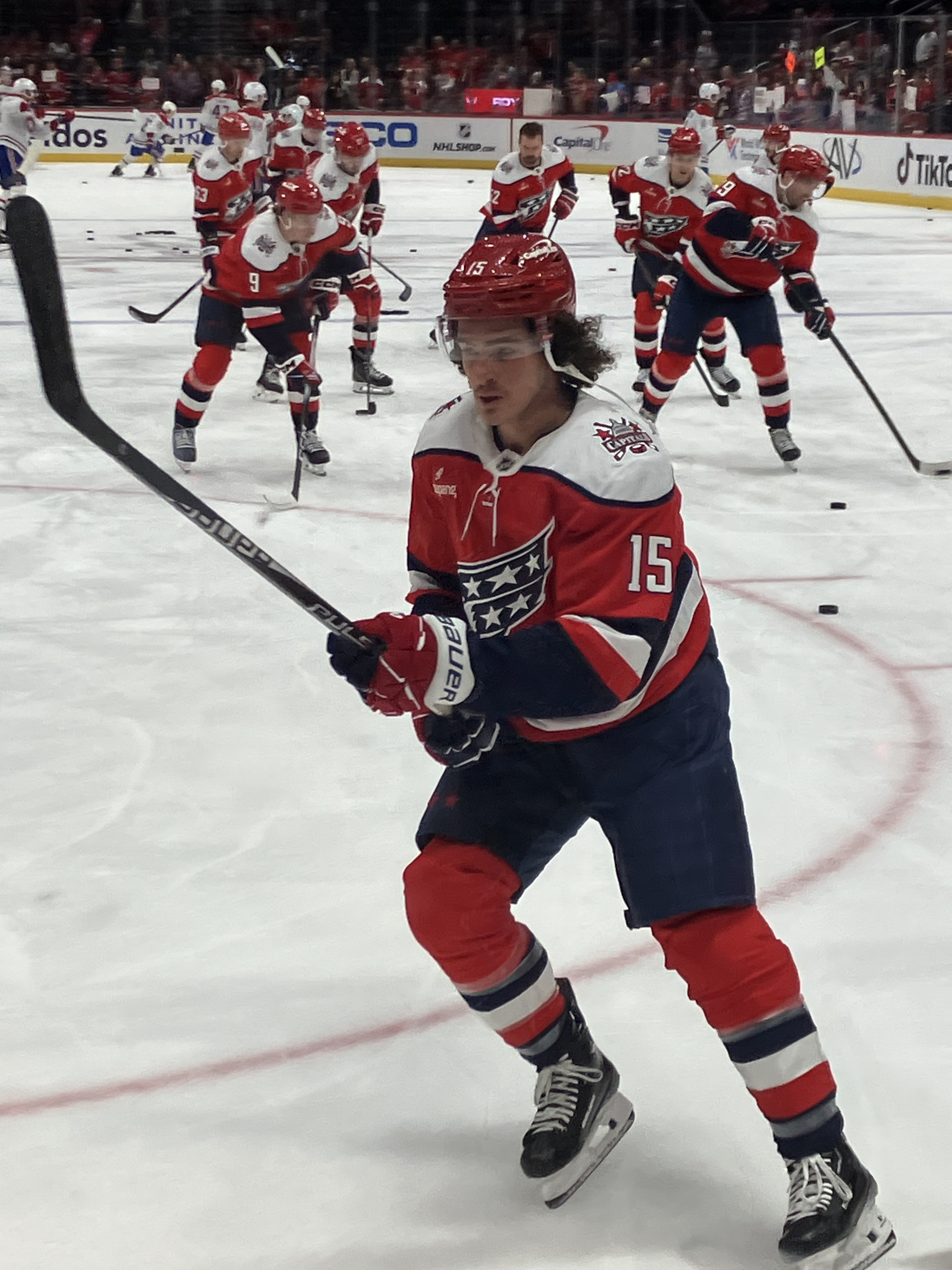
Milano with the Capitals in 2026

Late into his second season with the Capitals, Milano scored his first-ever hat trick in an intense 7–6 shootout win at home over the favored Carolina Hurricanes, a victory that boosted the Capitals' hopes of avoiding back-to-back postseason misses. He scored twice in the Capitals' last regular season meeting with the Tampa Bay Lightning, breaking his previous single season goal record of 14 and further solidifying Washington's tenacious stake on the final playoff spot on the Eastern Conference, which was finally clinched in their regular season finale, a 2–1 win over the Philadelphia Flyers.

Milano missed a large portion of the Capitals' 50th anniversary season due to an injury he sustained early in the season in a 3–2 win at home against the Nashville Predators on November 6, 2024. He returned to health during the 2025–26 season, splitting time with the Capitals and the Hershey Bears.

==== SC Bern ====
As a free agent from the Capitals, Milano left the NHL in agreeing to his first contract abroad by signing a one-year contract with SC Bern of the National League in Switzerland for the 2026–27 season on April 29, 2026.

== International play ==
Medal record

Representing United States

Ice hockey

World Championship
Bronze medal – third place	2018 Denmark	

World Junior Championship
Bronze medal – third place	2016 Finland	

IIHF World U18 Championship
Gold medal – first place	2014 Finland	

As a 16-year-old Milano won a bronze medal with Team USA at the 2013 World U-17 Hockey Challenge, and as a 17-year-old he helped the USA squad capture the gold medal at the 2014 IIHF World U18 Championships. Milano recorded 2 goals and 2 assists at the 2015 World Junior Championships. Milano was part of the bronze medal-winning USA U20 squad at the 2016 World Junior Ice Hockey Championships.

Milano was named to Team USA to compete at the 2018 IIHF World Championship, along with teammate Cam Atkinson.

== Personal life ==
On July 7, 2019, Milano and then-Colorado Avalanche forward A. J. Greer, were arrested in New York City for alleged third degree assault. The alleged assault was reportedly over the victim demanding money after getting Greer and Milano table service at a nightclub. Charges were subsequently dropped in January 2020 after Greer and Milano paid an undisclosed amount for the victim's medical bills and completed community service.

== Career statistics ==
=== Regular season and playoffs ===
			Regular season					Playoffs
Season	Team	League	GP	G	A	Pts	PIM	GP	G	A	Pts	PIM
2010–11	Portledge School	HS-Prep	18	10	11	21	—	—	—	—	—	—
2011–12	Cleveland Barons 16U AAA	T1EHL	40	44	43	87	10	—	—	—	—	—
2012–13	U.S. NTDP Juniors	USHL	38	10	12	22	12	—	—	—	—	—
2012–13	U.S. NTDP U17	USDP	56	20	27	47	20	—	—	—	—	—
2013–14	U.S. NTDP Juniors	USHL	25	14	25	39	21	—	—	—	—	—
2013–14	U.S. NTDP U18	USDP	58	29	57	86	23	—	—	—	—	—
2014–15	Plymouth Whalers	OHL	50	22	46	68	24	—	—	—	—	—
2014–15	Springfield Falcons	AHL	10	0	5	5	0	—	—	—	—	—
2015–16	Cleveland Monsters	AHL	54	14	17	31	22	17	4	4	8	4
2015–16	Columbus Blue Jackets	NHL	3	0	1	1	0	—	—	—	—	—
2016–17	Cleveland Monsters	AHL	63	18	29	47	24	—	—	—	—	—
2016–17	Columbus Blue Jackets	NHL	4	0	0	0	0	1	0	0	0	0
2017–18	Columbus Blue Jackets	NHL	55	14	8	22	10	3	0	0	0	0
2017–18	Cleveland Monsters	AHL	9	2	3	5	4	—	—	—	—	—
2018–19	Columbus Blue Jackets	NHL	8	1	0	1	0	—	—	—	—	—
2018–19	Cleveland Monsters	AHL	27	11	13	24	22	8	2	8	10	10
2019–20	Columbus Blue Jackets	NHL	46	5	13	18	22	—	—	—	—	—
2019–20	Anaheim Ducks	NHL	9	2	3	5	4	—	—	—	—	—
2020–21	Anaheim Ducks	NHL	6	0	0	0	0	—	—	—	—	—
2020–21	San Diego Gulls	AHL	2	0	2	2	0	—	—	—	—	—
2021–22	San Diego Gulls	AHL	1	0	1	1	0	—	—	—	—	—
2021–22	Anaheim Ducks	NHL	66	14	20	34	10	—	—	—	—	—
2022–23	Hershey Bears	AHL	5	2	1	3	2	—	—	—	—	—
2022–23	Washington Capitals	NHL	64	11	22	33	18	—	—	—	—	—
2023–24	Washington Capitals	NHL	49	15	8	23	10	4	0	0	0	0
2024–25	Washington Capitals	NHL	3	0	0	0	0	—	—	—	—	—
2025–26	Washington Capitals	NHL	31	4	4	8	4	—	—	—	—	—
2025–26	Hershey Bears	AHL	16	5	8	13	0	2	1	0	1	0
NHL totals			344	66	79	145	78	8	0	0	0	0

=== International ===
Year	Team	Event	Result	GP	G	A	Pts	PIM
2013	United States	U17	3rd place, bronze medalist(s)	6	4	6	10	6
2014	United States	U18	1st place, gold medalist(s)	7	3	7	10	4
2015	United States	WJC	5th	5	2	2	4	2
2018	United States	WC	3rd place, bronze medalist(s)	8	1	1	2	4
Junior totals				18	9	15	24	12
Senior totals				8	1	1	2	4

== Awards and honors ==
Awards	Year
AHL
Calder Cup champion	2016
Junior
CCM/USA Hockey All-American Prospects Game	2013

Awards and achievements
Preceded by Marko Daňo	Columbus Blue Jackets first-round draft pick 2014	Succeeded by Zach Werenski
