= Evgeny Svechnikov =

Russian ice hockey player (born 1996)

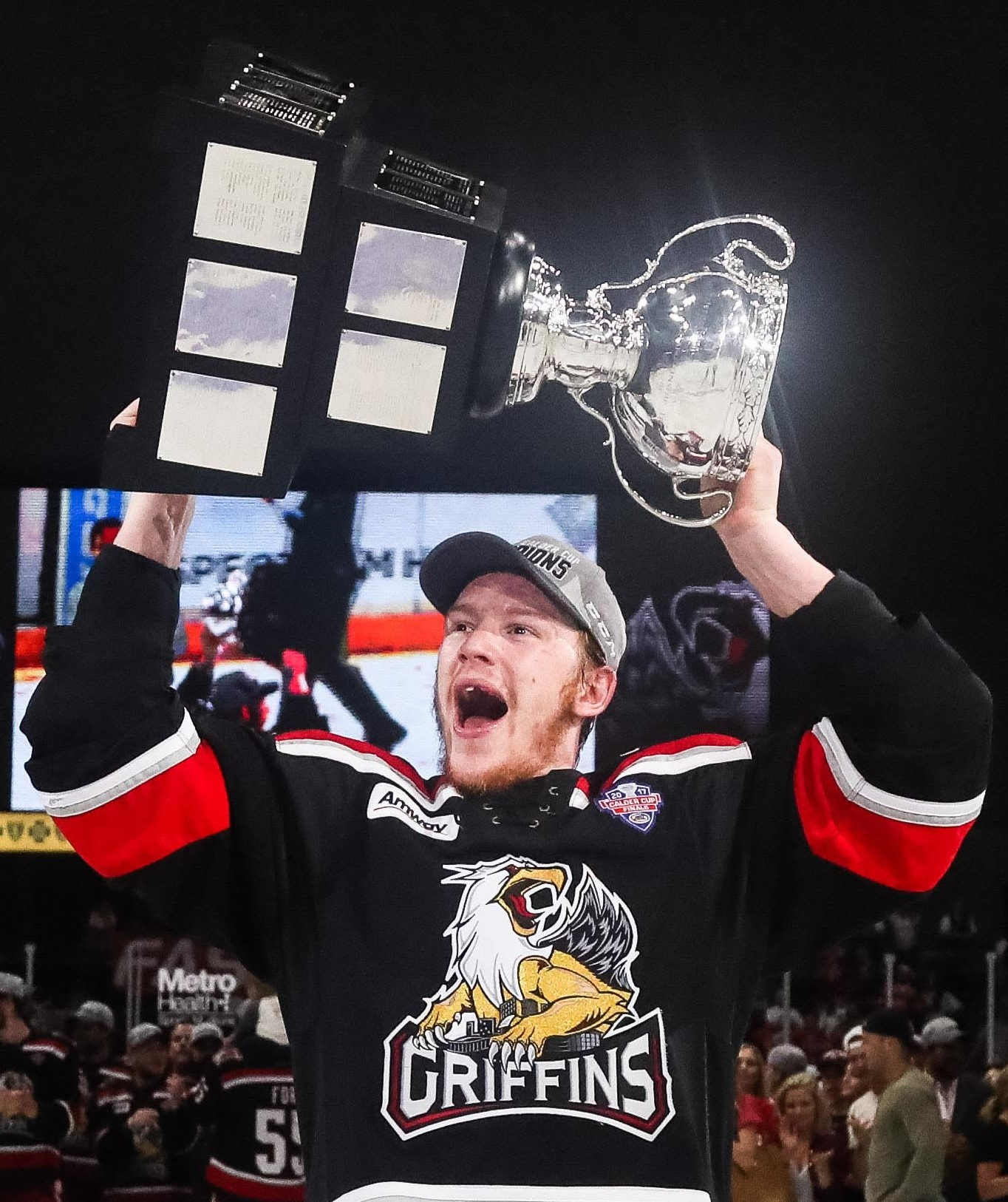
- Svechnikov with the Grand Rapids Griffins in 2017, holding the Calder Cup over his head
- Born: 31 October 1996 (age 29) Yuzhno-Sakhalinsk, Russia
- Height: 6 ft 3 in (191 cm)
- Weight: 208 lb (94 kg; 14 st 12 lb)
- Position: Winger
- Shoots: Left
- KHL team Former teams: Free agent Detroit Red Wings; Winnipeg Jets; San Jose Sharks; Ak Bars Kazan; Torpedo Nizhny Novgorod; Amur Khabarovsk
- NHL draft: 19th overall, 2015; Detroit Red Wings
- Playing career: 2013–present

Evgeny Igorevich Svechnikov (Russian: Евгений Игоревич Свечников; born 31 October 1996) is a Russian professional ice hockey player who is a winger. He is currently an unrestricted free agent who most recently played for Amur Khabarovsk of the Kontinental Hockey League (KHL). He has previously played in the National Hockey League (NHL) with the Detroit Red Wings, Winnipeg Jets and San Jose Sharks. He was drafted 19th overall by the Red Wings in the 2015 NHL entry draft.

== Playing career ==
In 2012, soon after his move to Kazan in 2010, Svechnikov began his junior career playing for Bars and Irbis, junior teams of the Ak Bars Kazan club system. He made his pro debut with Ak Bars before reaching the age of 17, during the 2013–14 season.

Svechnikov was drafted in the second round, 63rd overall, in the 2013 CHL Import Draft by the Cape Breton Screaming Eagles and committed to the organization for the 2014–15 season. In his rookie season, he finished third in club scoring, and ranked second among QMJHL rookies with 32 goals and 46 assists in 55 games. He led his team in points-per-game at 1.42. Following an outstanding rookie season, he was named to the QMJHL All-Rookie Team and featured in the CHL/NHL Top Prospects Game.

On 26 June 2015, Svechinkov was drafted 19th overall by the Detroit Red Wings in the 2015 NHL entry draft. On 2 October 2015 the Red Wings signed Svechinkov to a three-year, entry-level contract.

During the 2015–16 season, Svechnikov recorded 32 goals and 47 assists in 50 games. His 79 points ranked second on the team and tied for 18th in the QMJHL, while his 47 assists placed 17th and his 13 power play goals tied for eighth.

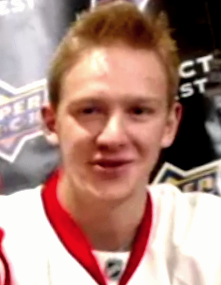
Svechnikov in 2016.

On 24 April 2016, Svechnikov was assigned to the Grand Rapids Griffins of the American Hockey League (AHL). On 3 April 2017, Svechnikov was recalled by the Red Wings. Prior to being recalled he recorded 18 goals and 26 assists in 68 games for the Griffins. He led all Griffins rookies in points and ranked among the top AHL rookies in goals (T10th), points (T6th), game-winning goals (T1st) and shots (2nd). He made his NHL debut for the Red Wings later that night in a game against the Ottawa Senators. In his debut, he scored the game-winning goal in a seven-round shootout. He was assigned to the Griffins on 5 April. He played two games with the Red Wings, recording four shots in 13:08 average time on ice. During the 2016–17 season, he ranked third on the Griffins with 20 goals and 31 assists in 74 regular-season games and added five goals and seven assists in 19 playoff games, to help lead the Griffins to the Calder Cup.

On 8 March 2018, Svechnikov was recalled by the Red Wings. After producing just five points over the Griffins's first 26 games this season, Svechnikov has recorded five goals and 12 assists in 25 games since 30 December 2017, including eight points in his last 11 games. On 20 March, Svechnikov scored his first career NHL goal against Petr Mrázek of the Philadelphia Flyers. On 4 April, Svechnikov was assigned to the Griffins. He appeared in 14 games for the Red Wings, posting two goals, two assists, eight penalty minutes, 15 shots on goal, 15 hits and six blocked shots.

On 16 October 2018, Svechnikov underwent anterior cruciate ligament reconstruction surgery on his right knee due to an injury he sustained in the Red Wings final preseason game against the Toronto Maple Leafs on 29 September 2018. He missed the entire 2018–19 season.

On 6 August 2020, Svechnikov accepted his qualifying offer and re-signed a one-year contract with the Red Wings. On 12 January 2021, the Red Wings assigned Svechnikov to the Grand Rapids Griffins. In the 2020–21 season, on 16 February 2021, Svechnikov was reassigned to the Red Wings. Prior to being recalled by the Red Wings, he recorded one goal and one assist in three games for the Griffins.

Following his sixth season within the Red Wings organization, after which he was still struggling to make a name for himself in the NHL, Svechnikov was not tendered a qualifying offer by the Red Wings, making him an unrestricted free agent. Unable to secure an NHL contract, Svechnikov on 20 August 2021 was signed to a one-year AHL contract with the Manitoba Moose, the primary affiliate to the Winnipeg Jets. After a successful training camp with the Jets, Svechnikov then signed a one-year NHL contract.

After the Jets did not send a qualifying offer to Svechnikov, Svechnikov as a free agent agreed to terms on a one-year, two-way, $750,000 contract with the San Jose Sharks on 4 September 2022.

In August 2023, Svechnikov returned to his native Russia and signed a contract with his original development club, Ak Bars Kazan. In the 2023–24 season, Svechnikov was unable to produce offensively to the level expected with Ak Bars, notching 8 goals and 13 points through 31 regular season games.

On 30 July 2024, Svechnikov left Ak Bars Kazan to sign a one-year contract with fellow KHL club, Torpedo Nizhny Novgorod. After a lone season with Novgorod, having posted 13 goals and 24 points through 57 regular season games in 2024–25, Svechnikov left to sign a one-year contract with Amur Khabarovsk on 2 July 2025.

== International play ==
Medal record

Men's ice hockey

Representing Russia

World Junior Championships
Silver medal – second place	2016 Finland	

World U-17 Hockey Challenge
Silver medal – second place	2013 Canada	

Svechnikov represented Russia at the 2013 World U-17 Hockey Challenge, where he recorded seven goals and one assist in six games, and won a silver medal. Svechnikov represented Russia at the 2016 World Junior Championships, where he won a silver medal.

== Personal ==
Svechnikov was born in Neftegorsk, Russia, but following the 1995 Neftegorsk earthquake his family moved to Barnaul. Evgeny's younger brother Andrei was drafted in the first round of the 2018 NHL entry draft by the Carolina Hurricanes.

== Career statistics ==
=== Regular season and playoffs ===
			Regular season					Playoffs
Season	Team	League	GP	G	A	Pts	PIM	GP	G	A	Pts	PIM
2012–13	Bars Kazan	MHL	34	9	9	18	34	4	1	1	2	2
2013–14	Bars Kazan	MHL	29	14	13	27	68	6	4	1	5	14
2013–14	Ak Bars Kazan	KHL	3	0	0	0	0	—	—	—	—	—
2014–15	Cape Breton Screaming Eagles	QMJHL	55	32	46	78	70	7	1	6	7	14
2015–16	Cape Breton Screaming Eagles	QMJHL	50	32	47	79	97	13	4	11	15	8
2015–16	Grand Rapids Griffins	AHL	—	—	—	—	—	2	0	1	1	0
2016–17	Grand Rapids Griffins	AHL	74	20	31	51	62	19	5	7	12	20
2016–17	Detroit Red Wings	NHL	2	0	0	0	0	—	—	—	—	—
2017–18	Grand Rapids Griffins	AHL	57	7	16	23	58	5	1	0	1	4
2017–18	Detroit Red Wings	NHL	14	2	2	4	8	—	—	—	—	—
2019–20	Grand Rapids Griffins	AHL	51	11	14	25	61	—	—	—	—	—
2019–20	Detroit Red Wings	NHL	4	0	0	0	2	—	—	—	—	—
2020–21	Grand Rapids Griffins	AHL	4	1	1	2	2	—	—	—	—	—
2020–21	Detroit Red Wings	NHL	21	3	5	8	10	—	—	—	—	—
2021–22	Winnipeg Jets	NHL	72	7	12	19	38	—	—	—	—	—
2022–23	San Jose Sharks	NHL	59	8	6	14	26	—	—	—	—	—
2023–24	Ak Bars Kazan	KHL	31	8	5	13	26	2	1	0	1	0
2024–25	Torpedo Nizhny Novgorod	KHL	57	13	11	24	72	3	0	0	0	6
2025–26	Amur Khabarovsk	KHL	34	8	8	16	40	—	—	—	—	—
KHL totals			125	29	24	53	138	5	1	0	1	6
NHL totals			172	20	25	45	84	—	—	—	—	—

=== International ===
Year	Team	Event	Result	GP	G	A	Pts	PIM
2013	Russia	WHC17	2nd place, silver medalist(s)	6	7	1	8	8
2013	Russia	WJC18	4th	7	0	1	1	4
2013	Russia	IH18	4th	4	0	0	0	8
2014	Russia	WJC18	5th	5	3	4	7	4
2016	Russia	WJC	2nd place, silver medalist(s)	7	0	0	0	6
Junior totals				29	10	6	16	30

== Awards and honours ==
Award	Year	Ref
QMJHL
All-Rookie Team	2015	
AHL
Calder Cup champion	2017	

Awards and achievements
Preceded by Dylan Larkin	Detroit Red Wings first-round draft pick 2015	Succeeded by Dennis Cholowski
