= Teemu Lämsä =

Finnish ice hockey player

- Born: 6 February 1996 (age 29); Turku, Finland
- Height: 6 ft 3 in (191 cm)
- Weight: 198 lb (90 kg; 14 st 2 lb)
- Position: Forward
- Shoots: Right
- Liiga team: HC TPS
- Playing career: 2014–present

Teemu Lämsä (born 6 February 1996) is a Finnish ice hockey player. He is currently playing with HC TPS in the Finnish Liiga.

Lämsä made his Liiga debut playing with HC TPS during the 2013–14 Liiga season.
