= August Gunnarsson =

Swedish ice hockey player

- Born: March 31, 1996 (age 28); Örebro, Sweden
- Height: 6 ft 0 in (183 cm)
- Weight: 179 lb (81 kg; 12 st 11 lb)
- Position: Forward
- Shoots: Right
- Allsv team Former teams: HC Vita Hästen; Färjestad BK
- Playing career: 2015–present

August Gunnarsson (born March 31, 1996) is a Swedish ice hockey player. He is currently playing with HC Vita Hästen of the HockeyAllsvenskan (Allsv).

Gunnarsson made his Swedish Hockey League debut playing with Färjestad BK during the 2014–15 SHL season.
