= Yegor Orlov =

Russian ice hockey player

- Born: July 20, 1996 (age 29) Moscow, Russia
- Height: 6 ft 1 in (185 cm)
- Weight: 187 lb (85 kg; 13 st 5 lb)
- Position: Defence
- Shoots: Left
- KHL team: HC Dynamo Moscow
- NHL draft: Undrafted
- Playing career: 2015–present

Yegor Orlov (born July 20, 1996) is a Russian ice hockey defenceman. He is currently playing with HC Dynamo Moscow of the Kontinental Hockey League (KHL).

On February 3, 2015, Orlov made his Kontinental Hockey League debut playing with HC Dynamo Moscow during the 2014–15 KHL season.
