= Nikita Yazkov =

Russian ice hockey player

- Born: February 27, 1996 (age 29); Novokuznetsk, Kemerovo Oblast, Russia
- Height: 6 ft 1 in (185 cm)
- Weight: 198 lb (90 kg; 14 st 2 lb)
- Position: Left wing
- Shoots: Right
- KHL team Former teams: Spartak Moscow; Metallurg Novokuznetsk; Ak Bars Kazan; Metallurg Magnitogorsk; Amur Khabarovsk
- Playing career: 2012–present

Nikita Yazkov (born February 27, 1996) is a Russian professional ice hockey forward who is currently playing with HC Spartak Moscow in the Kontinental Hockey League (KHL). He is a one-time Russian Champion.

== Awards and honours ==
Award	Year
KHL
Gagarin Cup (Ak Bars Kazan)	2018
