= Gustaf Franzen =

Swedish professional ice hockey player

- Born: September 22, 1996 (age 28); Valdemarsvik, Sweden
- Height: 5 ft 11 in (180 cm)
- Weight: 172 lb (78 kg; 12 st 4 lb)
- Position: Forward
- Shoots: Right
- Allsv team Former teams: BIK Karlskoga; HV71; Örebro HK; IK Oskarshamn
- NHL draft: Undrafted
- Playing career: 2014–present

Gustaf Franzen (born September 22, 1996) is a Swedish professional ice hockey player. He is currently playing for BIK Karlskoga of the HockeyAllsvenskan (Allsv).

Franzen made his Swedish Hockey League debut playing with HV71 during the 2013–14 SHL season. Franzen moved to North America and played two seasons of major junior with the Kitchener Rangers of the Ontario Hockey League.

Undrafted, Franzen opted to return to the SHL in Sweden, signing a two-year deal with Örebro HK on April 27, 2016. He made his Örebro debut in the opening two games of the 2016–17 season before he was assigned to Allsvenskan affiliate, a former youth club, HC Vita Hästen, on September 26, 2016.
