= Challenge Cup (ice hockey) =

International ice hockey tournament for youth

Challenge Cup AAA International Showcase
Tournament details
- Host country: Canada
- Venues: May 21–24, 2010: Burnaby 8Rinks; Burnaby Winter Club; Ice Sports North Shore; UBC Thunderbird Arena; Richmond Ice Center; Great Pacific Forum; Langley Twin Rinks; (in : Burnaby; Vancouver; North Vancouver (district); Richmond; Delta; Langley; host cities)
- Dates: 1992–present
- Teams: May 21–24, 2010: 250

Tournament statistics
- Attendance: 1,250 (per game average)

The Challenge Cup International AAA Championship Showcase (colloquially known as the Challenge Cup or simply The Cup) is an international ice hockey tournament held annually in Metro Vancouver, British Columbia for ice hockey teams from around the world. Ages range from Novice Minor (age 9) to Midget Major (age 18) for both girls and boys and the tournament is traditionally held on the weekend of the Canadian holiday Victoria Day.

Within each age level, teams are divided into three divisions: A, B, and C. During the exhibition round and round-robin play, teams play games with opponents within their own division. Upon completion of round-robin play, teams enter the elimination round. Teams play compete within their own divisions and later play teams in other divisions. Teams with the most wins are considered tournament winners. Points are distributed in the following order: three points for a regulation win, two points for an overtime win, one point for an overtime loss, and zero points for a regulation loss. Ties are decided in this order: 1) Most points; 2) Team with the greatest number of wins; 3) Games against team with equal record; 4) Penalty minute differential; 5) Basic goal differential GF (goals For) – GA (goals Against); 6) Total goal differential GF–GA/GF; 7) Team with the fewest penalty minutes.

== History ==
First held in 1992 as a relatively obscure tournament, the Challenge Cup has grown in prestige, particularly in the local community, particularly the Lower Mainland where the tournament ranks as one of the most significant events on the hockey calendar. Since its opening ceremonies on May 22, 1992, and the first finals on May 24, 1992, the tournament has grown to over 250 expected teams in 2010, another increase from previous years. In 2008 and 2009, the tournament hosted 186 teams, and 220 teams respectively. Among the divisions with the most teams are Bantam Minor (24 teams), Pee-Wee minor (24 teams), and Atom Major (26 teams). In 2007, there were even fewer teams, at 161. The opening ceremonies are always kicked off with a speech from the Challenge Cup's celebrity guest Walter Gretzky.

=== Walter Gretzky's appearances ===
Walter Gretzky, the prestigious father of NHL superstar Wayne Gretzky, makes an annual appearance at the tournament. He is involved in the opening ceremonies each year, to give the opening speech to all teams and participants involved, followed by an autograph session held in the upper lobby. Walter also actively participates in helping some of the younger players, in making pre-game appearances to the teams.

=== Other celebrity guest appearances ===
There have not been many other celebrity guests that have made their appearances to the tournament in the past years, except Walter Gretzky, of course. In the past few years, there have been two appearances by Garry Unger in 2008, and returned again in 2009. Gary played 16 seasons in the National Hockey League from 1967 until 1983. Unger holds the second longest consecutive games streak in NHL history, with 914 consecutive games played during the regular season between February 24, 1968 and December 21, 1979. Doug Jarvis holds the current record at 964 consecutive games. Unger ended up playing 1105 career NHL games, scoring 413 goals and 391 assists for 804 points, and he also registered 1075 career penalty minutes.

== Tournament statistics ==
=== 2010 champions ===
Note that as a result of the large number of teams in the 2010 tournament, some age levels played in two different divisions. A higher numbered division does not represent a more skilled team.

Age Level	Winner (Team Name)	Locale	Runner up (Team Name)	Locale	Final score
Midget Major	Okanagan Coyote Selects	British Columbia	New Western Bruins	Canada	5-2
Midget Minor	Information Not Available	N/A	Information Not Available	N/A	N/A
Bantam Major	Vancouver Millionaires	British Columbia	Pursuit of Excellence	British Columbia	2-1 OT
Bantam Minor	Calgary Jr. Flames (Division 1) and Red Deer Rustlers (Division 2)	Alberta	Saskatoon Junior Blades (Division 1) and Southern Alberta Selects (Division 2)	Saskatchewan and Alberta	4-3 OT (Division 1) and 3-0 (Division 2)
Peewee Major	Information Not Available	N/A	Information Not Available	N/A	N/A
Peewee Minor	Vancouver Selects	British Columbia	Vancouver Millionaires	British Columbia	4-3 OT
Atom Major	Can West Vipers (Division 1) and Colorado Thunderbirds (Division 2)	British Columbia and Colorado	Vancouver Selects (Division 1) and Steveston Sharks (Division 2)	British Columbia	6-2 (Division 1) and 2-1 OT (Division 2)
Atom Minor	Information Not Available	N/A	Information Not Available	N/A	N/A
Novice Major	BC Bears(Division 1) and Wolverine X-MEN (Division 2)	British Columbia and Alberta	Edmonton Jr. Oilers (Division 1) and Colorado Thunderbirds (Division 2)	Alberta and Colorado	6-4 (Division 1) and 9-0 (Division 2)
Novice Minor	Kelowna All-Stars	British Columbia	BC Bears	British Columbia	2-1
Midget Girls	Calgary Rocky Mountain Fury	Alberta	Fraser Valley Phantoms	British Columbia	6-3
Bantam Girls	Pacific Storm	British Columbia	Island Stars	British Columbia	4-2
Peewee Girls	West Coast Flyers	British Columbia	BC Rockets	British Columbia	2-0

=== 2010 scoring leaders ===
Age Level	Player name	Team name	Points	Goals	Assists
Midget Major	(Canada) Madison Dias	(British Columbia) Okanagan Coyote Selects	12	3	9
Midget Minor	Information Not Available	N/A	N/A	N/A	N/A
Bantam Major	(Canada) Adam Erne	(British Columbia) Vancouver Millionaires	15	8	7
Bantam Minor	(Canada) Tyler Coulter	Central Alberta Rage	13	7	6
Peewee Major	(Canada) Tyler Welsh	(British Columbia) Ice Dogs	14	9	5
Peewee Minor	(Canada) Kyle Uy	(British Columbia) Vancouver Junior Giants	8	6	2
Atom Major	(Canada) Brendon Marfleat	(British Columbia) Young Guns	12	6	6
Atom Minor	(Canada) Cam Lamberton	(British Columbia) Pacific Titans	9	8	1
Novice Major	(Canada) Dylan Wilson	(British Columbia) Tri-City Penguins	12	6	6
Novice Minor	(Canada) Ozzy Wiesblatt	(British Columbia) Kelowna All-Stars	11	7	4
Peewee Girls	(Canada) Meghan Kraus and Elizabeth "Libby" Riedl	(British Columbia) Vancouver Island Stars and Westcoast Flyers	4 (Both)	1	3
Bantam Girls	(Canada) Rachel Piitz	(Alberta) Calgary Rocky Mountain Storm	7	6	1
Midget Girls	(Canada) S. Laurin	(Alberta) Calgary Rocky Mountain Fury	9	6	3

=== 2009 champions ===
Age Level	Winner (Team Name)	Locale	Runner up (Team Name)	Locale	Final score
Midget Major	U18 Alberta Wolverines	Alberta	U18 Peace Country Selects	British Columbia	6-0
Midget Minor	Western Alberta Wolverines	Alberta	South Surrey Junior Eagles	British Columbia	6-5 OT
Bantam Major	Western 94 Sabers	Canada	West Coast Wings	United States	4-1
Bantam Minor	Alberta Predators	Alberta	Vancouver Selects	British Columbia	3-0
Peewee Major	Vancouver Selects	British Columbia	BC Bruins	British Columbia	5-1
Peewee Minor	Calgary Jr. Dinos	Alberta	Seattle Starz	(Washington (state)) Washington	3-2 2OT
Atom Major	Vancouver Selects	British Columbia	Alberta Wolverines	Alberta	2-0
Atom Minor	Prince George Ice Sharks	British Columbia	Vancouver Selects	British Columbia	2-1
Novice Major	Edge Mountaneers	British Columbia	Young Guns	Alberta	5-4 OT
Novice Minor	Vancouver Bulldogs	British Columbia	Can West Vipers	British Columbia	8-3
Midget Girls	Pursuit Of Excellence	British Columbia	Fraser Valley Falcons	British Columbia	2-1 OT
Bantam Girls	Pacific Storm	British Columbia	Island Heat	British Columbia	3-0
Peewee Girls	BC Rockets	British Columbia	NAA PeeWee Girls AAA	Alberta	3-2 OT

=== 2009 scoring leaders ===
Age Level	Player name	Team name	Points	Goals	Assists
Midget Major	(Canada) Madison Dias	(British Columbia) Okanagan Desert Dogs	13	6	8
Midget Minor	Information Not Available	N/A	N/A	N/A	N/A
Bantam Major	(United States) Anthony Olguin	(Colorado) Pikes Peak Miners	13	9	4
Bantam Minor	(Canada) Morgan Klimchuk	(Alberta) Calgary Jr. Flames	15	8	7
Peewee Major	(Canada) Tanner MacMaster	(Alberta) Calgary Jr. Flames	21	7	14
Peewee Minor	(Canada) Mathew Barzal	(British Columbia) Valley Eagles	17	9	8
Atom Major	(Canada) Jake Kryski	(British Columbia) 98 Vancouver Selects	14	9	5
Atom Minor	(Canada) Ocean Wiesblatt	Cougar Selects	18	7	11
Novice Major	(Canada) Bradley Braich	(British Columbia) Abbotsford Bulldogs	18	12	6
Novice Minor	(Canada) Henrik Rybinski	(British Columbia) Vancouver Bulldogs	20	7	13

== Skills competition ==
Winners are chosen and based on four categories. These events seem to serve at least two purposes: the first is to establish bragging rights between athletes for possessing a particular skill needed to succeed in the game, and the second is to increase revenue for those that sponsor the event. Skills contests are often held during an All-star break, but in this tournament, they are held as a part of a mid-tournament break, usually during the second day of competition, and usually the players get the entire afternoon off.

=== Fastest skater ===
Players skate two laps, one forward and one backward. A pivot is made between center ice and the blue line after finishing one lap. The player with the fastest recorded time wins.

=== Hardest shot ===
The speed of the player's shot (players take two shots) on net is recorded with a radar gun. The shot must hit the net to count. The fastest shot wins. If there is a radar gun malfunction, or if a radar gun is unavailable, a Most Accurate Shot competition will take place in lieu of the Hardest Shot. Players will be required to hit indicated targets in a limited amount of time.

=== Best puck handler ===
Players will skate with a puck through an indicated route, most likely marked with cones. Players must complete the entire course with the puck, and having not lost any control whatsoever during their routine. The player with the fastest recorded time wins.

=== Showdown ===
A player is required to take three breakaways in less than thirty seconds. Distances to the goal will vary between age groups. Saves and goals are recorded for each shooter and goalie. The goalie with the most saves wins, and the shooter with the most goals scored in the fastest recorded time wins. If necessary, goalies will perform a series of timed movement exercises to determine which goalie advances to the final round if their saves count is equal after the Round-Robin series.

== Notes ==
Preceded by 2010 Challenge Cup	2011 Challenge Cup; 19th Annual	Succeeded by 2012 Challenge Cup
