= USA Hockey All-American Game =

The Chipotle All-American Game (formerly the CCM/USA Hockey All-American Prospects Game and BioSteel All-American Game) is an annual ice hockey event in which 40 of the top American-born NHL entry draft eligible prospects play against each other in an exhibition game, each hoping to boost their draft ranking with the National Hockey League scouts and general managers who attend. To date, 292 players who have played in the All-American Game have been selected in the NHL draft, including 63 first-round selections.

== Results ==
Year	Score	Venue	Most Valuable Player	Attendance	Ref
2012	Team McClanahan 5–2 Team Housley	First Niagara Center, Buffalo, New York	Ryan Fitzgerald	5,519	
2013	Team Johnson 5–2 Team Mullen	Consol Energy Center, Pittsburgh, Pennsylvania	Keegan Iverson	5,059	
2014	Team Grier 6–3 Team Olczyk	First Niagara Center, Buffalo, New York	Jack Eichel	7,310	
2015	Team Plante 6–4 Team Roenick	First Niagara Center, Buffalo, New York	Luke McInnis	5,548	
2016	Team LeClair 6–4 Team Howe	Wells Fargo Center, Philadelphia, Pennsylvania	Casey Mittelstadt	N/A	
2017	Team Leetch 6–5 Team Chelios	KeyBank Center, Buffalo, New York	Brady Tkachuk	4,112	
2018	Team Langenbrunner 6–4 Team Leopold	Xcel Energy Center, Saint Paul, Minnesota	Matthew Boldy	3,448	
2020	Team Knuble 6–1 Team Gomez	USA Hockey Arena, Plymouth, Michigan	Jake Sanderson	1,621	
2021	Team Blue 7–1 Team White	USA Hockey Arena, Plymouth, Michigan	Sasha Pastujov	375	
2022	Team Blue 4–3 Team White (OT)	USA Hockey Arena, Plymouth, Michigan	Rutger McGroarty	865	
2023	Team Blue 6–3 Team White	USA Hockey Arena, Plymouth, Michigan	Will Smith	1,315	
2024	Team White 5–4 Team Blue (OT)	USA Hockey Arena, Plymouth, Michigan	James Hagens	1,338	

== NHL first round draft picks ==
Year	Pick	Player	Team
2013	4	Seth Jones	Nashville Predators
2013	25	Michael McCarron	Montreal Canadiens
2013	30	Ryan Hartman	Chicago Blackhawks
2014	15	Dylan Larkin	Detroit Red Wings
2014	16	Sonny Milano	Columbus Blue Jackets
2014	18	Alex Tuch	Minnesota Wild
2014	19	Tony DeAngelo	Tampa Bay Lightning
2014	20	Nick Schmaltz	Chicago Blackhawks
2015	2	Jack Eichel	Buffalo Sabres
2015	5	Noah Hanifin	Carolina Hurricanes
2015	8	Zach Werenski	Columbus Blue Jackets
2015	17	Kyle Connor	Winnipeg Jets
2015	21	Colin White	Ottawa Senators
2015	23	Brock Boeser	Vancouver Canucks
2015	25	Jack Roslovic	Winnipeg Jets
2016	6	Matthew Tkachuk	Calgary Flames
2016	7	Clayton Keller	Arizona Coyotes
2016	11	Logan Brown	Ottawa Senators
2016	14	Charlie McAvoy	Boston Bruins
2016	15	Luke Kunin	Minnesota Wild
2016	19	Kieffer Bellows	New York Islanders
2016	24	Max Jones	Anaheim Ducks
2016	25	Riley Tufte	Dallas Stars
2016	26	Tage Thompson	St. Louis Blues
2016	29	Trent Frederic	Boston Bruins
2017	8	Casey Mittelstadt	Buffalo Sabres
2017	19	Josh Norris	San Jose Sharks
2017	22	Kailer Yamamoto	Edmonton Oilers
2017	25	Ryan Poehling	Montreal Canadiens
2017	26	Jake Oettinger	Dallas Stars
2018	4	Brady Tkachuk	Ottawa Senators
2018	7	Quinn Hughes	Vancouver Canucks
2018	11	Oliver Wahlstrom	New York Islanders
2018	14	Joel Farabee	Philadelphia Flyers
2018	19	Jay O'Brien	Philadelphia Flyers
2018	22	K'Andre Miller	New York Rangers
2019	1	Jack Hughes	New Jersey Devils
2019	5	Alex Turcotte	Los Angeles Kings
2019	9	Trevor Zegras	Anaheim Ducks
2019	12	Matthew Boldy	Minnesota Wild
2019	13	Spencer Knight	Florida Panthers
2019	14	Cameron York	Philadelphia Flyers
2019	15	Cole Caufield	Montreal Canadiens
2019	30	John Beecher	Boston Bruins
2020	5	Jake Sanderson	Ottawa Senators
2020	29	Brendan Brisson	Vegas Golden Knights
2021	2	Matty Beniers	Seattle Kraken
2021	12	Cole Sillinger	Columbus Blue Jackets
2021	13	Matthew Coronato	Calgary Flames
2021	18	Chaz Lucius	Winnipeg Jets
2021	24	Mackie Samoskevich	Florida Panthers
2022	3	Logan Cooley	Arizona Coyotes
2022	5	Cutter Gauthier	Philadelphia Flyers
2022	13	Frank Nazar	Chicago Blackhawks
2022	14	Rutger McGroarty	Winnipeg Jets
2022	23	Jimmy Snuggerud	St. Louis Blues
2022	25	Sam Rinzel	Chicago Blackhawks
2022	31	Isaac Howard	Tampa Bay Lightning
2023	4	Will Smith	San Jose Sharks
2023	8	Ryan Leonard	Washington Capitals
2023	19	Oliver Moore	Chicago Blackhawks
2023	23	Gabe Perreault	New York Rangers

== See also ==
- CHL/NHL Top Prospects Game
