= 2016 World Junior Ice Hockey Championships rosters =

Below are the rosters for teams competing in the 2016 World Junior Ice Hockey Championships.

== Group A ==
=== Canada ===
- Head coach: (Canada) Dave Lowry

| Pos. | No. | Player | Team | NHL Rights |
|---|---|---|---|---|
| GK | 1 | Mason McDonald | (Canada) Charlottetown Islanders | Calgary Flames |
| GK | 29 | Mackenzie Blackwood | (Canada) Barrie Colts | New Jersey Devils |
| GK | 33 | Samuel Montembeault | (Canada) Blainville-Boisbriand Armada | Florida Panthers |
| D | 3 | Joe Hicketts – A | (Canada) Victoria Royals | Detroit Red Wings |
| D | 4 | Haydn Fleury | (Canada) Red Deer Rebels | Carolina Hurricanes |
| D | 5 | Thomas Chabot | (Canada) Saint John Sea Dogs | Ottawa Senators |
| D | 6 | Brandon Hickey | (United States) Boston University | Calgary Flames |
| D | 20 | Roland McKeown | (Canada) Kingston Frontenacs | Carolina Hurricanes |
| D | 23 | Travis Sanheim | (Canada) Calgary Hitmen | Philadelphia Flyers |
| D | 24 | Travis Dermott | (United States) Erie Otters | Toronto Maple Leafs |
| F | 9 | Dylan Strome | (United States) Erie Otters | Arizona Coyotes |
| F | 11 | Brendan Perlini | (Canada) Niagara IceDogs | Arizona Coyotes |
| F | 12 | Julien Gauthier | (Canada) Val-d'Or Foreurs | Draft Eligible 2016 |
| F | 13 | Mathew Barzal | (United States) Seattle Thunderbirds | New York Islanders |
| F | 14 | Rourke Chartier | (Canada) Kelowna Rockets | San Jose Sharks |
| F | 16 | Mitch Marner | (Canada) London Knights | Toronto Maple Leafs |
| F | 17 | Travis Konecny | (Canada) Ottawa 67's | Philadelphia Flyers |
| F | 18 | Jake Virtanen | (Canada) Vancouver Canucks | Vancouver Canucks |
| F | 19 | Brayden Point – C | (Canada) Moose Jaw Warriors | Tampa Bay Lightning |
| F | 21 | Anthony Beauvillier | (Canada) Shawinigan Cataractes | New York Islanders |
| F | 22 | John Quenneville | (Canada) Brandon Wheat Kings | New Jersey Devils |
| F | 27 | Mitchell Stephens | (United States) Saginaw Spirit | Tampa Bay Lightning |
| F | 28 | Lawson Crouse – A | (Canada) Kingston Frontenacs | Florida Panthers |

=== Denmark ===
- Head coach: (Denmark) Olaf Eller

| Pos. | No. | Player | Team | NHL Rights |
|---|---|---|---|---|
| GK | 1 | Mathias Seldrup | (Denmark) Herning IK | Undrafted 2015 |
| GK | 30 | Lasse Petersen | (United States) Spokane Chiefs | Undrafted 2015 |
| GK | 31 | Thomas Lillie | (Sweden) Växjö Lakers | Undrafted 2015 |
| D | 2 | Anders Krogsgaard | (Denmark) Esbjerg Energy | Undrafted 2014 |
| D | 4 | Ludvig Adamsen | (Canada) Surrey Eagles | Undrafted 2015 |
| D | 5 | Matias Lassen | (Sweden) Leksands IF | Undrafted 2015 |
| D | 6 | Lasse Bo Knudsen | (Denmark) Aalborg Pirates | Undrafted 2014 |
| D | 8 | Nicolai Weichel | (Denmark) Rungsted IK | Draft Eligible 2016 |
| D | 12 | Christian Mieritz | (Canada) Hamilton Bulldogs | Draft Eligible 2016 |
| D | 15 | Morten Jensen | (Sweden) Rögle BK J20 | Undrafted 2015 |
| F | 9 | Markus Jensen | (Denmark) Herning Blue Fox | Undrafted 2014 |
| F | 10 | Thomas Olesen | (Sweden) Malmö Redhawks J20 | Undrafted 2014 |
| F | 10 | Kristian Jensen | (Sweden) Luleå HF | Undrafted 2014 |
| F | 16 | Jonas Røndbjerg | (Denmark) Rungsted IK | Draft Eligible 2017 |
| F | 17 | Mathias From | (Sweden) Rögle BK | Draft Eligible 2016 |
| F | 18 | William Boysen | (Denmark) Rungsted IK | Undrafted 2015 |
| F | 19 | Nikolaj Krag Christensen | (Denmark) Rødovre Mighty Bulls | Draft Eligible 2016 |
| F | 20 | Jeppe Jul Korsgaard | (Denmark) Aalborg Pirates | Draft Eligible 2016 |
| F | 23 | Jeppe Holmberg | (Denmark) Esbjerg Energy | Undrafted 2014 |
| F | 24 | Niklas Andersen | (United States) Spokane Chiefs | Draft Eligible 2016 |
| F | 25 | Søren Nielsen | (Denmark) Esbjerg Energy | Undrafted 2015 |
| F | 27 | Alexander True | (United States) Seattle Thunderbirds | Undrafted 2015 |
| F | 28 | Emil Oliver Christensen | (Denmark) Rødovre Mighty Bulls | Undrafted 2014 |

=== Sweden ===
- Head coach: (Sweden) Rikard Grönborg

| Pos. | No. | Player | Team | NHL Rights |
|---|---|---|---|---|
| GK | 1 | Felix Sandström | (Sweden) Brynäs IF | Philadelphia Flyers |
| GK | 30 | Linus Söderström | (Sweden) Djurgårdens IF | New York Islanders |
| GK | 35 | Erik Källgren | (Sweden) IK Oskarshamn | Arizona Coyotes |
| D | 3 | William Lagesson | (United States) U. of Massachusetts Amherst | Edmonton Oilers |
| D | 4 | Jacob Larsson | (Sweden) Frölunda HC | Anaheim Ducks |
| D | 5 | Adam Ollas Mattsson | (Sweden) Djurgårdens IF | Calgary Flames |
| D | 6 | Andreas Englund – C | (Sweden) Djurgårdens IF | Ottawa Senators |
| D | 7 | Marcus Pettersson | (Sweden) Skellefteå AIK | Anaheim Ducks |
| D | 8 | Gustav Forsling | (Sweden) Linköpings HC | Chicago Blackhawks |
| D | 9 | Gabriel Carlsson | (Sweden) Linköpings HC | Columbus Blue Jackets |
| F | 12 | Jakob Forsbacka Karlsson | (United States) Boston University | Boston Bruins |
| F | 16 | Carl Grundström | (Sweden) Modo Hockey | Draft Eligible 2016 |
| F | 17 | Dmytro Timashov | (Canada) Quebec Remparts | Toronto Maple Leafs |
| F | 18 | Rasmus Asplund | (Sweden) Färjestad BK | Draft Eligible 2016 |
| F | 19 | Alexander Nylander | (Canada) Mississauga Steelheads | Draft Eligible 2016 |
| F | 20 | Joel Eriksson Ek | (Sweden) Färjestad BK | Minnesota Wild |
| F | 21 | William Nylander – A | (Canada) Toronto Marlies | Toronto Maple Leafs |
| F | 23 | Oskar Lindblom | (Sweden) Brynäs IF | Philadelphia Flyers |
| F | 24 | Jens Lööke | (Sweden) Brynäs IF | Arizona Coyotes |
| F | 25 | Axel Holmström – A | (Sweden) Skellefteå AIK | Detroit Red Wings |
| F | 26 | Christoffer Ehn | (Sweden) Frölunda HC | Detroit Red Wings |
| F | 27 | Anton Karlsson | (Sweden) Frölunda HC | Arizona Coyotes |
| F | 29 | Adrian Kempe | (United States) Ontario Reign | Los Angeles Kings |

=== Switzerland ===
- Head coach: (Switzerland) John Fust

| Pos. | No. | Player | Team | NHL Rights |
|---|---|---|---|---|
| GK | 1 | Ludovic Waeber | (Switzerland) HC Red Ice | Undrafted 2014 |
| GK | 29 | Gauthier Descloux | (Switzerland) Genève-Servette HC | Undrafted 2014 |
| GK | 30 | Joren van Pottelberghe | (Sweden) Linköpings HC | Detroit Red Wings |
| D | 3 | Andrea Glauser | (Switzerland) HC Fribourg-Gottéron | Undrafted 2014 |
| D | 4 | Roger Karrer | (Switzerland) ZSC Lions | Undrafted 2015 |
| D | 6 | Edson Harlacher | (Switzerland) Kloten Flyers | Undrafted 2014 |
| D | 9 | Marco Forrer | (Switzerland) HC Davos | Undrafted 2015 |
| D | 20 | Simon Kindschi | (Switzerland) HC Davos | Undrafted 2015 |
| D | 25 | Jonas Siegenthaler | (Switzerland) ZSC Lions | Washington Capitals |
| D | 27 | Fabian Heldner | (Switzerland) HC Davos | Undrafted 2014 |
| F | 11 | Julien Privet | (Switzerland) EHC Visp | Undrafted 2014 |
| F | 12 | Calvin Thürkauf | (Canada) Kelowna Rockets | Undrafted 2015 |
| F | 13 | Denis Malgin | (Switzerland) ZSC Lions | Florida Panthers |
| F | 14 | Dario Meyer | (Canada) Edmonton Oil Kings | Undrafted 2015 |
| F | 15 | Kris Schmidli | (Switzerland) GC Küsnacht Lions | Undrafted 2014 |
| F | 16 | Auguste Impose | (Canada) Quebec Remparts | Undrafted 2015 |
| F | 18 | Nico Hischier | (Switzerland) SC Bern | Draft Eligible 2017 |
| F | 19 | Damien Riat | (Switzerland) Genève-Servette HC | Undrafted 2015 |
| F | 21 | Chris Egli | (Switzerland) HC Davos | Undrafted 2014 |
| F | 22 | Tino Kessler | (Switzerland) HC Davos | Undrafted 2014 |
| F | 24 | Pius Suter | (Switzerland) ZSC Lions | Undrafted 2014 |
| F | 26 | Noah Rod | (Switzerland) Genève-Servette HC | San Jose Sharks |
| F | 28 | Timo Meier | (Canada) Halifax Mooseheads | San Jose Sharks |

=== United States ===
- Head coach: (United States) Ron Wilson

| Pos. | No. | Player | Team | NHL Rights |
|---|---|---|---|---|
| GK | 31 | Alex Nedeljkovic | (Canada) Niagara IceDogs | Carolina Hurricanes |
| GK | 36 | Brandon Halverson | (Canada) Sault Ste. Marie Greyhounds | New York Rangers |
| D | 4 | Chad Krys | (United States) U.S. NTDP | Draft Eligible 2016 |
| D | 5 | Brandon Fortunato | (United States) Boston University | Undrafted 2014 |
| D | 8 | Louie Belpedio – A | (United States) Miami University | Minnesota Wild |
| D | 13 | Zach Werenski – C | (United States) University of Michigan | Columbus Blue Jackets |
| D | 20 | Will Borgen | (United States) St. Cloud State University | Buffalo Sabres |
| D | 25 | Charlie McAvoy | (United States) Boston University | Draft Eligible 2016 |
| D | 26 | Brandon Carlo | (United States) Tri-City Americans | Boston Bruins |
| F | 9 | Nick Schmaltz | (United States) University of North Dakota | Chicago Blackhawks |
| F | 7 | Matthew Tkachuk | (Canada) London Knights | Draft Eligible 2016 |
| F | 10 | Anders Bjork | (United States) University of Notre Dame | Boston Bruins |
| F | 11 | Christian Dvorak | (Canada) London Knights | Arizona Coyotes |
| F | 12 | Alex DeBrincat | (United States) Erie Otters | Draft Eligible 2016 |
| F | 14 | Scott Eansor | (United States) Seattle Thunderbirds | Undrafted 2014 |
| F | 17 | Ryan MacInnis | (Canada) Kitchener Rangers | Arizona Coyotes |
| F | 18 | Colin White – A | (United States) Boston College | Ottawa Senators |
| F | 19 | Ryan Donato | (United States) Harvard University | Boston Bruins |
| F | 21 | Ryan Hitchcock | (United States) Yale University | Undrafted 2014 |
| F | 23 | Brock Boeser | (United States) University of North Dakota | Vancouver Canucks |
| F | 28 | Sonny Milano | (United States) Lake Erie Monsters | Columbus Blue Jackets |
| F | 34 | Auston Matthews – A | (Switzerland) ZSC Lions | Draft Eligible 2016 |

== Group B ==
=== Belarus ===
- Head coach: (Latvia) / (Belarus) Aleksandrs Belavskis

| Pos. | No. | Player | Team | NHL Rights |
|---|---|---|---|---|
| GK | 20 | Alexander Osipkov | (Belarus) MHK Yunost Minsk | Undrafted 2015 |
| GK | 25 | Vladislav Verbitsky | (Belarus) Dinamo U20 | Undrafted 2015 |
| GK | 31 | Ivan Kulbakov | (Belarus) Dinamo U20 | Undrafted 2015 |
| D | 2 | Alexander Tabolin | (Belarus) Dinamo U20 | Undrafted 2015 |
| D | 3 | Pavel Vorobey | (Belarus) Dinamo U20 | Undrafted 2015 |
| D | 4 | Stepan Falkovsky | (Canada) Ottawa 67's | Undrafted 2015 |
| D | 5 | Ilya Sushko | (Belarus) Dinamo U20 | Draft Eligible 2016 |
| D | 9 | Vladislav Goncharov – C | (Belarus) Dinamo U20 | Undrafted 2015 |
| D | 14 | Sergei Romanovich | (Belarus) Dinamo U20 | Undrafted 2015 |
| D | 24 | Daniil Bokun – A | (Belarus) Dinamo U20 | Undrafted 2014 |
| F | 6 | Alexander Patsenkin | (Belarus) MHK Yunost Minsk | Undrafted 2015 |
| F | 8 | Yegor Sharangovich | (Belarus) Dinamo-Raubichi Minsk | Draft Eligible 2016 |
| F | 10 | Dmitry Buinitsky | (Belarus) Dinamo Minsk | Undrafted 2015 |
| F | 11 | Dmitri Filippovich | (Belarus) Dinamo U20 | Undrafted 2014 |
| F | 13 | Alexei Busko | (Belarus) Shakhter Soligorsk | Undrafted 2014 |
| F | 15 | Grigori Veremyov | (Belarus) Dinamo U20 | Undrafted 2014 |
| F | 16 | Alexei Patsenkin | (Belarus) MHK Yunost Minsk | Undrafted 2015 |
| F | 18 | Ilya Bobko | (Belarus) Dinamo U20 | Undrafted 2015 |
| F | 19 | Artemi Chernikov | (Belarus) Dinamo U20 | Undrafted 2014 |
| F | 22 | Danila Karaban – A | (Belarus) Dinamo U20 | Undrafted 2014 |
| F | 23 | Andrei Belevich | (Belarus) Dinamo U20 | Undrafted 2015 |
| F | 26 | Ruslan Vasilchuk | (Belarus) Dinamo U20 | Draft Eligible 2016 |
| F | 27 | Vadim Malinovsky | (United States) Okanagan European Eagles | Undrafted 2014 |

=== Czech Republic ===
- Head coach: (Czech Republic) / (Australia) Jakub Petr

| Pos. | No. | Player | Team | NHL Rights |
|---|---|---|---|---|
| GK | 1 | Vítek Vaněček | (United States) South Carolina Stingrays | Washington Capitals |
| GK | 2 | Aleš Stezka | (United States) Sioux Falls Stampede | Minnesota Wild |
| GK | 30 | Daniel Vladař | (United States) Chicago Steel | Boston Bruins |
| D | 4 | Ondřej Mikliš | (Czech Republic) Mountfield HK | Undrafted 2014 |
| D | 9 | David Sklenička | (Czech Republic) HC Plzeň | Undrafted 2014 |
| D | 12 | Alex Rašner | (Czech Republic) HC Olomouc | Undrafted 2014 |
| D | 20 | Jakub Zbořil | (Canada) Saint John Sea Dogs | Boston Bruins |
| D | 23 | Jan Ščotka | (Czech Republic) HC Pardubice | Undrafted 2014 |
| D | 24 | Filip Pyrochta | (Canada) Val-d'Or Foreurs | Undrafted 2014 |
| D | 25 | Filip Hronek | (Czech Republic) Mountfield HK | Draft Eligible 2016 |
| D | 27 | Dominik Mašín | (Canada) Peterborough Petes | Tampa Bay Lightning |
| F | 9 | David Pastrňák | (United States) Boston Bruins | Boston Bruins |
| F | 10 | Jiří Smejkal | (Canada) Moose Jaw Warriors | Undrafted 2015 |
| F | 11 | Šimon Stránský | (Canada) Prince Albert Raiders | Draft Eligible 2016 |
| F | 13 | Pavel Zacha | (Canada) Sarnia Sting | New Jersey Devils |
| F | 14 | Filip Chlapík | (Canada) Charlottetown Islanders | Ottawa Senators |
| F | 15 | Dominik Lakatoš | (Czech Republic) Bílí Tygři Liberec | Undrafted 2015 |
| F | 17 | Jan Ordoš | (Czech Republic) Bílí Tygři Liberec | Undrafted 2015 |
| F | 18 | Michael Špaček | (Canada) Red Deer Rebels | Winnipeg Jets |
| F | 19 | Radek Veselý | (Czech Republic) Piráti Chomutov | Undrafted 2014 |
| F | 21 | Daniel Voženílek | (Czech Republic) HC Pardubice | Undrafted 2014 |
| F | 22 | David Kaše | (Czech Republic) Piráti Chomutov | Philadelphia Flyers |
| F | 26 | Tomáš Šoustal | (Canada) Kelowna Rockets | Undrafted 2015 |
| F | 28 | David Tomášek | (Czech Republic) HC Pardubice | Undrafted 2014 |

=== Finland ===
- Head coach: (Finland) Jukka Jalonen

| Pos. | No. | Player | Team | NHL Rights |
|---|---|---|---|---|
| GK | 1 | Kaapo Kähkönen | (Finland) Espoo Blues | Minnesota Wild |
| GK | 30 | Veini Vehviläinen | (Finland) JYP Jyväskylä | Draft Eligible 2016 |
| GK | 31 | Emil Larmi | (Finland) Peliitat Heinola | Undrafted 2015 |
| D | 2 | Sami Niku | (Finland) JYP Jyväskylä | Winnipeg Jets |
| D | 3 | Miro Keskitalo | (Finland) TPS | Undrafted 2014 |
| D | 4 | Olli Juolevi | (Canada) London Knights | Draft Eligible 2016 |
| D | 5 | Eetu Sopanen | (Finland) Lahti Pelicans | Undrafted 2014 |
| D | 6 | Joni Tuulola | (Finland) HPK | Chicago Blackhawks |
| D | 7 | Niko Mikkola | (Finland) KalPa | St. Louis Blues |
| D | 18 | Vili Saarijärvi | (United States) Flint Firebirds | Detroit Red Wings |
| F | 9 | Jesse Puljujärvi | (Finland) Oulun Kärpät | Draft Eligible 2016 |
| F | 10 | Roope Hintz | (Finland) Ilves | Dallas Stars |
| F | 12 | Kasper Björkqvist | (Finland) Espoo Blues | Undrafted 2015 |
| F | 13 | Miska Siikonen | (Finland) Lahti Pelicans | Undrafted 2014 |
| F | 15 | Mikko Rantanen – C | (United States) San Antonio Rampage | Colorado Avalanche |
| F | 19 | Aleksi Saarela | (Finland) Ässät | New York Rangers |
| F | 20 | Sebastian Aho | (Finland) Oulun Kärpät | Carolina Hurricanes |
| F | 21 | Antti Kalapudas | (Finland) Oulun Kärpät | Undrafted 2015 |
| F | 23 | Sebastian Repo | (Finland) Lahti Pelicans | Undrafted 2014 |
| F | 24 | Kasperi Kapanen | (Canada) Toronto Marlies | Toronto Maple Leafs |
| F | 25 | Julius Nättinen | (Canada) Barrie Colts | Anaheim Ducks |
| F | 28 | Juho Lammikko | (Canada) Kingston Frontenacs | Florida Panthers |
| F | 29 | Patrik Laine | (Finland) Tappara | Draft Eligible 2016 |

=== Russia ===
- Head coach: (Russia) Valeri Bragin

| Pos. | No. | Player | Team | NHL Rights |
|---|---|---|---|---|
| GK | 1 | Ilya Samsonov | (Russia) Metallurg Magnitogorsk | Washington Capitals |
| GK | 20 | Maxim Tretiak | (Russia) Krasnaya Armiya | Undrafted 2015 |
| GK | 30 | Alexandar Georgiyev | (Finland) TPS | Undrafted 2014 |
| D | 2 | Sergei Boikov | (Canada) Drummondville Voltigeurs | Colorado Avalanche |
| D | 3 | Dmitri Sergeyev | (Canada) Kitchener Rangers | Undrafted 2014 |
| D | 4 | Damir Sharipzyanov | (Canada) Owen Sound Attack | Los Angeles Kings |
| D | 5 | Alexander Mikulovich | (Canada) Niagara IceDogs | Undrafted 2014 |
| D | 9 | Ivan Provorov | (Canada) Brandon Wheat Kings | Philadelphia Flyers |
| D | 22 | Yegor Voronkov | (Russia) HC Vityaz | Undrafted 2015 |
| D | 28 | Yegor Rykov | (Russia) SKA-1946 | Undrafted 2015 |
| D | 29 | Nikita Zhuldikov | (Russia) Traktor Chelyabinsk | Undrafted 2014 |
| F | 7 | Evgeny Svechnikov | (Canada) Cape Breton Screaming Eagles | Detroit Red Wings |
| F | 8 | Andrei Svetlakov – A | (Russia) CSKA Moscow | Undrafted 2014 |
| F | 11 | Maxim Lazarev | (Canada) Cape Breton Screaming Eagles | Undrafted 2014 |
| F | 12 | Pavel Kraskovsky – A | (Russia) Lokomotiv Yaroslavl | Winnipeg Jets |
| F | 13 | Alexander Polunin | (Russia) Lokomotiv Yaroslavl | Undrafted 2015 |
| F | 16 | Vladislav Kamenev – C | (United States) Milwaukee Admirals | Nashville Predators |
| F | 17 | Kirill Kaprizov | (Russia) Metallurg Novokuznetsk | Minnesota Wild |
| F | 19 | Radel Fazleyev | (Canada) Calgary Hitmen | Philadelphia Flyers |
| F | 21 | Andrei Kuzmenko | (Russia) CSKA Moscow | Undrafted 2014 |
| F | 23 | Artur Lauta | (Russia) Avangard Omsk | Undrafted 2014 |
| F | 25 | Alexander Dergachyov | (Russia) SKA Saint Petersburg | Los Angeles Kings |
| F | 26 | Yegor Korshkov | (Russia) Lokomotiv Yaroslavl | Undrafted 2015 |

=== Slovakia ===
- Head coach: (Slovakia) (Czech Republic) Ernest Bokroš

| Pos. | No. | Player | Team | NHL Rights |
|---|---|---|---|---|
| GK | 1 | Dávid Hrenák | (Slovakia) HK Orange 20 | Draft Eligible 2016 |
| GK | 2 | Stanislav Škorvánek | (Slovakia) HK Orange 20 | Undrafted |
| GK | 30 | Adam Húska | (United States) Green Bay Gamblers | New York Rangers |
| D | 3 | Adrián Sloboda | (Slovakia) HK Orange 20 | Undrafted |
| D | 5 | Matej Moravčík | (Slovakia) HK Orange 20 | Undrafted |
| D | 6 | Patrik Koch | (Slovakia) HK Orange 20 | Undrafted |
| D | 7 | Ladislav Romančík | (Sweden) Södertälje SK | Undrafted |
| D | 13 | Samuel Ivanič | (Slovakia) HK Orange 20 | Undrafted |
| D | 14 | Erik Černák - A | (United States) Erie Otters | Los Angeles Kings |
| D | 16 | Patrik Maier | (Canada) Kamloops Blazers | Undrafted |
| D | 26 | Christián Jaroš - C | (Sweden) Luleå HF | Ottawa Senators |
| F | 8 | Matej Paločko | (Czech Republic) Bílí Tygři Liberec | Undrafted |
| F | 9 | Juraj Šiška | (Slovakia) HK Orange 20 | Undrafted |
| F | 10 | Dominik Briestenský | (Slovakia) HK Orange 20 | Undrafted |
| F | 11 | Radovan Bondra | (Canada) Vancouver Giants | Chicago Blackhawks |
| F | 12 | Juraj Milý | (Slovakia) HK Orange 20 | Undrafted |
| F | 15 | Jozef Huňa | (Czech Republic) Bílí Tygři Liberec | Undrafted |
| F | 17 | Maroš Surový | (Slovakia) HK Orange 20 | Undrafted |
| F | 18 | Boris Sádecký | (Slovakia) HK Orange 20 | Draft Eligible 2016 |
| F | 19 | Matúš Sukeľ - A | (Slovakia) HK Orange 20 | Undrafted |
| F | 22 | Kristián Pospíšil | (Canada) Blainville-Boisbriand Armada | Undrafted |
| F | 23 | Lukáš Hrušík | (Slovakia) HK Orange 20 | Undrafted |
| F | 27 | Filip Lešťan | (Sweden) HV71 | Draft Eligible 2016 |
