= 2017 World Junior Ice Hockey Championships rosters =

Below are the rosters for teams competing in the 2017 World Junior Ice Hockey Championships.

== Group A ==
=== Czech Republic ===
- Head coach: (Czech Republic) Jakub Petr

Pos.	No.	Player	Team	NHL Rights
GK	1	Petr Kváča	(Czech Republic) Motor České Budějovice	
GK	2	Jakub Škarek	(Czech Republic) Dukla Jihlava	
GK	30	Daniel Vladař	(United States) Providence Bruins	Boston Bruins
D	3	Daniel Krenželok	(Czech Republic) Vítkovice Ridera	
D	6	Ondřej Vála	(Canada) Kamloops Blazers	Dallas Stars
D	7	David Kvasnička	(Czech Republic) HC Plzeň	
D	12	František Hrdinka	(Sweden) Linköpings HC J20	
D	20	Jakub Zbořil	(Canada) Saint John Sea Dogs	Boston Bruins
D	28	Petr Kalina	(Czech Republic) Sparta Prague	
D	29	Filip Hronek – C	(United States) Saginaw Spirit	Detroit Red Wings
F	8	Martin Nečas	(Czech Republic) Kometa Brno	
F	14	Filip Chlapík	(Canada) Charlottetown Islanders	Ottawa Senators
F	15	Tomáš Šoustal	(Canada) Kelowna Rockets	
F	16	Daniel Kurovský	(Czech Republic) Vítkovice Ridera	
F	17	Lukáš Jašek	(Czech Republic) Oceláři Třinec	Vancouver Canucks
F	18	Michael Špaček – A	(Canada) Red Deer Rebels	Winnipeg Jets
F	21	Radek Koblížek	(Finland) Oulun Kärpät	
F	22	David Kaše – A	(Czech Republic) Piráti Chomutov	Philadelphia Flyers
F	23	Šimon Stránský	(Canada) Prince Albert Raiders	
F	24	Filip Suchý	(United States) Omaha Lancers	
F	25	Kristian Reichel	(Czech Republic) HC Litvínov	
F	26	Adam Musil	(Canada) Red Deer Rebels	St. Louis Blues

=== Denmark ===
- Head coach: (Denmark) Olaf Eller

Pos.	No.	Player	Team	NHL Rights
GK	1	Emil Gransøe	(United States) Topeka Roadrunners	
GK	30	Lasse Petersen	(Canada) Red Deer Rebels	
GK	31	Kasper Krog	(Denmark) SønderjyskE Ishockey	
D	2	Oliver Larsen	(Denmark) Odense Bulldogs	
D	3	Anders Koch	(Denmark) Esbjerg Energy	
D	5	Oliver Gatz Nielsen	(Denmark) Herning Blue Fox	
D	7	Mathias Røndbjerg	(Denmark) Rungsted Seier Capital	
D	8	Nicolai Weichel – A	(Denmark) Rungsted Seier Capital	
D	12	Christian Mieritz – A	(Sweden) Leksands IF	
D	15	Morten Jensen	(Sweden) Rögle BK	
F	9	Jeppe Jul Korsgaard	(Denmark) Aalborg Pirates	
F	10	Rasmus Thykjær Andersson	(Sweden) HV71	
F	11	Joachim Blichfeld	(United States) Portland Winterhawks	San Jose Sharks
F	13	Christian Wejse	(Canada) Blainville-Boisbriand Armada	
F	14	Niklas Andersen	(Denmark) Esbjerg Energy	
F	16	Jonas Røndbjerg	(Sweden) Växjö Lakers	
F	18	William Boysen	(Denmark) Rungsted Seier Capital	
F	19	Nikolaj Krag Christensen	(Sweden) Rögle BK	St. Louis Blues
F	20	Mathias From	(Sweden) Rögle BK	Chicago Blackhawks
F	21	Tobias Maximilian Ladehoff	(Denmark) Aalborg Pirates	
F	22	Frederik Høeg	(Denmark) Odense Bulldogs	
F	23	David Madsen	(Sweden) Växjö Lakers	
F	27	Alexander True – C	(United States) Seattle Thunderbirds	

=== Finland ===
- Head coach: (Finland) Jukka Rautakorpi / (Finland) Jussi Ahokas

Pos.	No.	Player	Team	NHL Rights
GK	1	Markus Ruusu	(Finland) JYP Jyväskylä	Dallas Stars
GK	30	Karolus Kaarlehto	(Finland) TPS	
GK	31	Veini Vehviläinen	(Finland) JYP Jyväskylä	
D	2	Miro Heiskanen	(Finland) HIFK	
D	3	Urho Vaakanainen	(Finland) JYP Jyväskylä	
D	6	Juho Rautanen	(Finland) Jokerit	
D	7	Olli Juolevi – C	(Canada) London Knights	Vancouver Canucks
D	12	Juuso Välimäki	(United States) Tri-City Americans	
D	18	Vili Saarijärvi – A	(Canada) Mississauga Steelheads	Detroit Red Wings
D	28	Jesper Mattila	(United States) Boston College	
F	9	Janne Kuokkanen	(Canada) London Knights	Carolina Hurricanes
F	10	Kasper Björkqvist – A	(United States) Providence College	Pittsburgh Penguins
F	13	Henrik Borgström	(United States) University of Denver	Florida Panthers
F	15	Petrus Palmu	(Canada) Owen Sound Attack	
F	20	Julius Mattila	(United States) Boston College	
F	21	Joona Luoto	(Finland) Tappara	
F	22	Arttu Ruotsalainen	(Finland) Ässät	
F	25	Julius Nättinen	(Canada) Windsor Spitfires	Anaheim Ducks
F	27	Teemu Väyrynen	(Finland) TPS	
F	32	Aapeli Räsänen	(United States) Sioux City Musketeers	Edmonton Oilers
F	33	Eeli Tolvanen	(United States) Sioux City Musketeers	
F	34	Kristian Vesalainen	(Finland) HPK	
F	35	Otto Koivula	(Finland) Ilves	New York Islanders

=== Sweden ===
- Head coach: (Sweden) Tomas Montén

Pos.	No.	Player	Team	NHL Rights
GK	1	Felix Sandström	(Sweden) Brynäs IF	Philadelphia Flyers
GK	30	Filip Gustavsson	(Sweden) Luleå HF	Pittsburgh Penguins
GK	35	Adam Werner	(Sweden) IF Björklöven	Colorado Avalanche
D	4	Jacob Larsson	(Sweden) Frölunda HC	Anaheim Ducks
D	5	David Bernhardt	(Sweden) Djurgårdens IF	Philadelphia Flyers
D	6	Kristoffer Gunnarsson	(Sweden) IK Oskarshamn	
D	7	Oliver Kylington	(United States) Stockton Heat	Calgary Flames
D	8	Rasmus Dahlin	(Sweden) Frölunda HC	
D	9	Gabriel Carlsson	(Sweden) Linköpings HC	Columbus Blue Jackets
D	23	Lucas Carlsson	(Sweden) Brynäs IF	Chicago Blackhawks
F	11	Filip Ahl	(Canada) Regina Pats	Ottawa Senators
F	14	Elias Pettersson	(Sweden) Timrå IK	
F	15	Lias Andersson	(Sweden) HV71	
F	16	Carl Grundström – A	(Sweden) Frölunda HC	Toronto Maple Leafs
F	17	Fredrik Karlström	(Sweden) AIK	Dallas Stars
F	18	Rasmus Asplund – A	(Sweden) Färjestad BK	Buffalo Sabres
F	19	Alexander Nylander	(United States) Rochester Americans	Buffalo Sabres
F	20	Joel Eriksson Ek – C	(Sweden) Färjestad BK	Minnesota Wild
F	24	Jens Lööke	(Sweden) Timrå IK	Arizona Coyotes
F	25	Sebastian Ohlsson	(Sweden) Skellefteå AIK	
F	27	Jonathan Dahlén	(Sweden) Timrå IK	Ottawa Senators
F	28	Andreas Wingerli	(Sweden) Skellefteå AIK	
F	29	Tim Söderlund	(Sweden) Skellefteå AIK	

=== Switzerland ===
- Head coach: (Switzerland) Christian Wohlwend

Pos.	No.	Player	Team	NHL Rights
GK	1	Matteo Ritz	(Switzerland) Lausanne HC	
GK	29	Philip Wuthrich	(Switzerland) SC Bern	
GK	30	Joren van Pottelberghe	(Switzerland) HC Davos	Detroit Red Wings
D	3	Tobias Geisser	(Switzerland) EV Zug	
D	4	Roger Karrer	(Switzerland) ZSC Lions	
D	5	Livio Stadler	(Sweden) Luleå HF	
D	7	Nico Gross	(Switzerland) EV Zug	
D	10	Serge Weber	(Switzerland) EHC Kloten	
D	24	Colin Gerber	(Switzerland) SC Langenthal	
D	25	Jonas Siegenthaler – A	(Switzerland) ZSC Lions	Washington Capitals
F	8	Jerome Portmann	(Switzerland) HC Davos	
F	9	Damien Riat – A	(Switzerland) Genève-Servette HC	Washington Capitals
F	11	Marco Miranda	(Switzerland) GCK Lions	
F	12	Calvin Thürkauf – C	(Canada) Kelowna Rockets	Columbus Blue Jackets
F	15	Nathan Marchon	(Switzerland) HC Fribourg-Gottéron	
F	16	Loïc In-Albon	(Switzerland) Lausanne HC	
F	17	Raphael Prassl	(Switzerland) GCK Lions	
F	18	Nico Hischier	(Canada) Halifax Mooseheads	
F	20	Philipp Kurashev	(Canada) Quebec Remparts	
F	21	Fabian Haberstich	(Switzerland) EV Zug	
F	22	Nando Eggenberger	(Switzerland) HC Davos	
F	23	Dominik Diem	(Switzerland) GCK Lions	

== Group B ==
=== Canada ===
- Head coach: (Canada) Dominique Ducharme

Pos.	No.	Player	Team	NHL Rights
GK	1	Connor Ingram	(Canada) Kamloops Blazers	Tampa Bay Lightning
GK	31	Carter Hart	(United States) Everett Silvertips	Philadelphia Flyers
D	2	Jake Bean	(Canada) Calgary Hitmen	Carolina Hurricanes
D	3	Noah Juulsen	(United States) Everett Silvertips	Montreal Canadiens
D	5	Thomas Chabot – A	(Canada) Saint John Sea Dogs	Ottawa Senators
D	6	Philippe Myers	(Canada) Rouyn-Noranda Huskies	Philadelphia Flyers
D	8	Dante Fabbro	(United States) Boston University	Nashville Predators
D	10	Kale Clague	(Canada) Brandon Wheat Kings	Los Angeles Kings
D	15	Jérémy Lauzon	(Canada) Rouyn-Noranda Huskies	Boston Bruins
F	9	Dillon Dubé	(Canada) Kelowna Rockets	Calgary Flames
F	11	Mathieu Joseph	(Canada) Saint John Sea Dogs	Tampa Bay Lightning
F	12	Julien Gauthier	(Canada) Val-d'Or Foreurs	Carolina Hurricanes
F	14	Mathew Barzal – A	(United States) Seattle Thunderbirds	New York Islanders
F	16	Taylor Raddysh	(United States) Erie Otters	Tampa Bay Lightning
F	17	Tyson Jost	(United States) University of North Dakota	Colorado Avalanche
F	18	Pierre-Luc Dubois	(Canada) Cape Breton Screaming Eagles	Columbus Blue Jackets
F	19	Dylan Strome – C	(United States) Erie Otters	Arizona Coyotes
F	20	Michael McLeod	(Canada) Mississauga Steelheads	New Jersey Devils
F	21	Blake Speers	(Canada) Sault Ste. Marie Greyhounds	New Jersey Devils
F	22	Anthony Cirelli	(Canada) Oshawa Generals	Tampa Bay Lightning
F	25	Nicolas Roy	(Canada) Chicoutimi Saguenéens	Carolina Hurricanes
F	27	Mitchell Stephens	(United States) Saginaw Spirit	Tampa Bay Lightning

=== Latvia ===
- Head coach: (Latvia) Ēriks Miļuns

Pos.	No.	Player	Team	NHL Rights
GK	1	Denijs Romanovskis	(Latvia) HS Riga	
GK	29	Gustavs Dāvis Grigals	(Latvia) HK Rīga	
GK	30	Mareks Egīls Mitens	(United States) Aston Rebels	
D	3	Eduards Hugo Jansons	(Latvia) Zemgale Jelgava	
D	4	Gvido Jansons	(United States) Aston Rebels	
D	5	Kristiāns Rubīns	(Canada) Medicine Hat Tigers	
D	7	Maksims Ponomarenko	(Norway) Lorenskog IK	
D	8	Kristaps Zīle – C	(Latvia) Dinamo Riga	
D	15	Tomass Zeile	(United States) Shreveport Mudbugs	
D	23	Kārlis Čukste – A	(United States) Quinnipiac University	San Jose Sharks
D	26	Rimants Zeilis	(Latvia) HK Rīga	
F	6	Eduards Tralmaks	(United States) Chicago Steel	
F	9	Rihards Puide	(Switzerland) GCK Lions	
F	10	Mārtiņš Dzierkals	(Canada) Rouyn-Noranda Huskies	Toronto Maple Leafs
F	11	Renārs Krastenbergs	(Canada) Oshawa Generals	
F	12	Erlends Kļaviņš	(United States) Omaha Lancers	
F	14	Roberts Baranovskis	(Latvia) HK Rīga	
F	16	Valters Apfelbaums	(Latvia) Prizma Riga	
F	17	Roberts Bļugers	(United States) Fairbanks Ice Dogs	
F	18	Ričards Bernhards	(United States) Springfield Jr. Blues	
F	21	Rūdolfs Balcers	(Canada) Kamloops Blazers	San Jose Sharks
F	22	Filips Buncis – A	(United States) Johnstown Tomahawks	
F	24	Deniss Smirnovs	(Switzerland) Geneve Futur Hockey	

=== Russia ===
- Head coach: (Russia) Valeri Bragin

Pos.	No.	Player	Team	NHL Rights
GK	1	Anton Krasotkin	(Russia) Lokomotiv Yaroslavl	
GK	20	Vladislav Sukhachyov	(Russia) Chelyabinsk Polar Bears	
GK	30	Ilya Samsonov	(Russia) Metallurg Magnitogorsk	Washington Capitals
D	2	Vadim Kudako	(Russia) Severstal Cherepovets	
D	3	Mikhail Sidorov	(Russia) Ak Bars Kazan	
D	6	Sergei Zborovskiy	(Canada) Regina Pats	New York Rangers
D	15	Yegor Voronkov	(Russia) Vityaz Podolsk	
D	23	Grigori Dronov	(Russia) Metallurg Magnitogorsk	
D	26	Mikhail Sergachev	(Canada) Windsor Spitfires	Montreal Canadiens
D	28	Yegor Rykov – A	(Russia) SKA Saint Petersburg	New Jersey Devils
D	29	Artyom Volkov	(Russia) Dynamo Moscow	
F	7	Kirill Kaprizov – C	(Russia) Salavat Yulaev Ufa	Minnesota Wild
F	8	Kirill Urakov	(Russia) Torpedo Nizhny Novgorod	
F	9	Danila Kvartalnov – A	(Russia) CSKA Moscow	
F	10	Alexander Polunin	(Russia) Lokomotiv Yaroslavl	
F	14	Kirill Belyayev	(Russia) Yugra Khanty-Mansiysk	
F	17	German Rubtsov	(Russia) Vityaz Podolsk	Philadelphia Flyers
F	19	Pavel Karnaukhov	(Russia) CSKA Moscow	Calgary Flames
F	21	Denis Alexeyev	(Russia) MHC Loko	
F	22	Danil Yurtaikin	(Russia) MHC Loko	
F	24	Mikhail Vorobyev	(Russia) Salavat Yulaev Ufa	Philadelphia Flyers
F	25	Yakov Trenin	(Canada) Gatineau Olympiques	Nashville Predators
F	27	Denis Guryanov	(United States) Texas Stars	Dallas Stars

=== Slovakia ===
- Head coach: (Slovakia) Ernest Bokroš

Pos.	No.	Player	Team	NHL Rights
GK	1	Roman Durný	(Slovakia) HK Orange 20	
GK	2	Matej Tomek	(United States) University of North Dakota	Philadelphia Flyers
GK	30	Adam Huska	(United States) University of Connecticut	New York Rangers
D	3	Martin Bodák	(Finland) Tappara	
D	4	Oliver Košecký	(Slovakia) HK Orange 20	
D	5	Michal Roman	(Czech Republic) Oceláři Třinec	
D	6	Martin Fehérváry	(Sweden) Malmö J20	
D	7	Samuel Hain	(Slovakia) HK Orange 20	
D	14	Erik Černák	(United States) Erie Otters	Los Angeles Kings
D	16	Andrej Hatala	(Slovakia) Dukla Trenčín	
D	17	Mário Grman	(Slovakia) HK Orange 20	
F	8	Marek Hecl	(Slovakia) HK Orange 20	
F	11	Radovan Bondra	(Canada) Vancouver Giants	Chicago Blackhawks
F	12	Marian Studenič	(Canada) Hamilton Bulldogs	
F	15	Marek Sloboda	(Slovakia) HK Orange 20	
F	18	Boris Sádecký	(Slovakia) HK Orange 20	
F	20	Adam Ružička	(Canada) Sarnia Sting	
F	22	Oliver Pataky	(Slovakia) HK Orange 20	
F	23	Martin Andrisík	(Slovakia) HK Orange 20	
F	25	Miroslav Struska	(Slovakia) HK Orange 20	
F	26	Miloš Roman	(Czech Republic) Oceláři Třinec	
F	27	Filip Lešťan	(Sweden) HV71	
F	29	Patrik Oško	(Slovakia) HK Orange 20	

=== United States ===
- Head coach: (United States) Bob Motzko

Pos.	No.	Player	Team	NHL Rights
GK	1	Tyler Parsons	(Canada) London Knights	Calgary Flames
GK	30	Jake Oettinger	(United States) Boston University	
GK	31	Joseph Woll	(United States) Boston College	Toronto Maple Leafs
D	2	Ryan Lindgren	(United States) University of Minnesota	Boston Bruins
D	3	Jack Ahcan	(United States) St. Cloud State University	
D	4	Caleb Jones	(United States) Portland Winterhawks	Edmonton Oilers
D	6	Casey Fitzgerald	(United States) Boston College	Buffalo Sabres
D	8	Adam Fox	(United States) Harvard University	Calgary Flames
D	25	Charlie McAvoy – A	(United States) Boston University	Boston Bruins
D	33	Joseph Cecconi	(United States) University of Michigan	Dallas Stars
F	9	Luke Kunin – C	(United States) University of Wisconsin	Minnesota Wild
F	10	Tanner Laczynski	(United States) Ohio State University	Philadelphia Flyers
F	11	Patrick Harper	(United States) Boston University	Nashville Predators
F	12	Jordan Greenway	(United States) Boston University	Minnesota Wild
F	13	Joey Anderson	(United States) University of Minnesota Duluth	New Jersey Devils
F	14	Erik Foley	(United States) Providence College	Winnipeg Jets
F	17	Jeremy Bracco	(Canada) Kitchener Rangers	Toronto Maple Leafs
F	18	Colin White – A	(United States) Boston College	Ottawa Senators
F	19	Clayton Keller	(United States) Boston University	Arizona Coyotes
F	20	Troy Terry	(United States) University of Denver	Anaheim Ducks
F	23	Kieffer Bellows	(United States) Boston University	New York Islanders
F	28	Jack Roslovic	(Canada) Manitoba Moose	Winnipeg Jets
F	29	Tage Thompson	(United States) University of Connecticut	St. Louis Blues
