= 2015 IIHF World U18 Championship Division I =

International ice hockey tournaments

2015 IIHF U18 World Championship Division I

Tournament details
- Host countries: Hungary; Slovenia
- Venues: 2 (in 2 host cities)
- Dates: 12–18 April 2015
- Teams: 12

The 2015 IIHF U18 World Championship Division I was two international under-18 ice hockey tournaments organised by the International Ice Hockey Federation. The Division I A and Division I B tournaments represent the second and the third tier of the IIHF World U18 Championship.

== Division I A ==
The Division I A tournament was played in Debrecen, Hungary, from 12 to 18 April 2015.

=== Participants ===
Team	Qualification
Denmark	Placed 10th in 2014 Top Division and were relegated
Norway	Placed 2nd in 2014 Division I A
Kazakhstan	Placed 3rd in 2014 Division I A
Belarus	Placed 4th in 2014 Division I A
France	Placed 5th in 2014 Division I A
Hungary	Hosts, placed 1st in 2014 Division I B and were promoted

=== Standings ===
Pos	Team	Pld	W	OTW	OTL	L	GF	GA	GD	Pts	Promotion or relegation
1	Denmark	5	4	1	0	0	28	8	+20	14	Promoted to the 2016 Top Division
2	Belarus	5	3	1	1	0	19	11	+8	12	
3	France	5	2	1	0	2	16	13	+3	8	
4	Norway	5	2	0	2	1	14	12	+2	8	
5	Kazakhstan	5	1	0	0	4	15	28	−13	3	
6	Hungary	5	0	0	0	5	11	31	−20	0	Relegated to the 2016 Division I B

Source: IIHF

=== Results ===
All times are local. (Central European Summer Time – UTC+2)

12 April 2015; 13:00	Belarus	3–2 OT (0–1, 1–1, 1–0); OT:(1–0)	Norway	Főnix Hall, Debrecen; Attendance: 210

Game reference

Alexander Osipkov
Goalies
Jakob Opsahl
Referee:
(Poland) Pizemyslav Kepa
Linesmen:
(Russia) Yakow Paley
(Hungary) Botond Palkovi

	0–1	05:35 – Krogdahl (Ronnild, Christensen)
	0–2	32:44 – Gulliksen (Paulsen) (PP)
Buinitski (Alexei Patsenkin, Alexa. Patsenkin) (PP) – 38:33	1–2
Gavrilenko (Vorobei, Buinitski) (PP) – 43:49	2–2
Vorobei (Alexei Patsenkin, Shikut) (PP) – 61:12	3–2

12 min
Penalties
14 min
32
Shots
20

12 April 2015; 16:30	Hungary	1–9 (1–3, 0–4, 0–2)	Denmark	Főnix Hall, Debrecen; Attendance: 560

Game reference

Gergely Bors
Goalies
Lasse Petersen
Referee:
(Latvia) Juris Balodis
Linesmen:
(Ukraine) Artem Korepanov
(Latvia) Kriss Kupcus

	0–1	01:13 – Boysen (O. Nielsen, D. Nielsen)
	0–2	09:26 – Ladehoff (Weichel) (PP)
	0–3	12:49 – True (Ladehoff, Korsgaard)
Gaspar (Sagi, Simotics) (PP)	1–3
	1–4	22:44 – Christensen (Brinkmann, Mieritz)
	1–5	32:52 – Brinkmann (From, Christensen)
	1–6	33:09 – D. Nielsen (Krag, Boysen)
	1–7	39:37 – True (Weichel, Ladehoff) (PP)
	1–8	52:46 – From (Brinkmann, M. Jensen) (PP)
	1–9	56:56 – Korsgaard (K. Jensen, D. Nielsen)

14 min
Penalties
26 min
28
Shots
48

12 April 2015; 20:00	France	7–1 (2–0, 3–1, 2–0)	Kazakhstan	Főnix Hall, Debrecen; Attendance: 250

Game reference

Raphael Garnier
Goalies
Nikita Ustinovich
Referee:
(United Kingdom) Tom Darnell
Linesmen:
(United States) Daniel Cohen
(Denmark) Jonas Reimer

Matima (Ville, Ritz) – 04:59	1–0
Colomban (SH) – 10:54	2–0
Matima (Ville) – 23:08	3–0
	3–1	23:54 – Borovikov (Polokhov)
Addamo (Coulaud) – 29:54	4–1
Addamo (Maia) – 36:39	5–1
Maia (Colomban) – 50:22	6–1
Addamo (Colomban, Maia) – 53:03	7–1

8 min
Penalties
31 min
43
Shots
26

13 April 2015; 16:30	Norway	2–3 OT (1–0, 0–1, 1–1); OT (0–1)	France	Főnix Hall, Debrecen; Attendance: 185

Game reference

Jakob Opsahl
Goalies
Raphael Garnier
Referee:
(Italy) Daniel Gamper
Linesmen:
(Austria) David Nothegger
(Denmark) Jonas Reimer

Ekberg (Marthinsen) – 04:29	1–0
	1–1	29:28 – Couland (Fritz-Dreysse, Ville) (PP)
Paulsen (Jorgensen, Gronstad) – 43:44	2–1
	2–2	46:29 – Torres (Colomban)
	2–3	62:41 – Maia

10 min
Penalties
12 min
43
Shots
38

13 April 2015; 20:00	Denmark	4–3 OT (1–1, 1–2, 1–0); OT (1–0)	Belarus	Főnix Hall, Debrecen; Attendance: 150

Game reference

Lasse Petersen
Goalies
Vladislav Verbitski
Referee:
(United Kingdom) Tom Darnell
Linesmen:
(United States) Daniel Cohen
(Russia) Yakov Paley

Ladehoff – 07:01	1–0
	1–1	13:15 – Alexei Patsenkin
	1–2	30:02 – Shikut (Alexei Patsenkin, Buinitski) (PP)
	1–3	36:22 – Alexa. Patsenkin (Alexei Patsenkin) (SH)
Krag – 39:59	2–3
Ladehoff (M. Jensen) (PP) – 57:43	3–3
Krag – 60:25	4–3

29 min
Penalties
10 min
35
Shots
33

14 April 2015; 16:30	Kazakhstan	6–5 (2–3, 1–1, 3–1)	Hungary	Főnix Hall, Debrecen; Attendance: 370

Game reference

Alexander Kutko
Nikita Ustinovich
Goalies
Bence Kiss
Referee:
(Poland) Przemyslav Kepa
Linesmen:
(Ukraine) Artem Korepanov
(Russia) Yakov Paley

	0–1	07:15 – Horvath
	0–2	08:08 – Torok (Garat, P. Kiss) (PP)
Smolyakov (Pavlov, Kiselyov) – 10:36	1–2
Demyanov (Melikhov, Solodovnikov) – 13:10	2–2
	2–3	15:23 – Szita (Gaspar, Z. Kiss)
	2–4	29:39 – Z. Kiss (Simotics, Torok)
Makeyev (Panyukov) – 29:53	3–4
Borisevich (Panyukov) (PP) – 45:54	4–4
Demyanov (Kiselyov, Smolyakov) – 47:06	5–4
Demyanov (EA) – 48:26	6–4
	6–5	58:59 – Stipsicz (Torok) (EA)

14 min
Penalties
10 min
52
Shots
41

15 April 2015; 13:00	Denmark	4–1 (1–0, 1–1, 2–0)	France	Főnix Hall, Debrecen; Attendance: 190

Game reference

Lasse Petersen
Goalies
Raphael Garnier
Referee:
(Poland) Przemyslav Kepa
Linesmen:
(Austria) David Nothegger
(Hungary) Botond Palkovi

Ladehoff (True, J. Roendbjerg) – 10:07	1–0
	1–1	30:44 – Ville (Matima)
Korsgaard (D. Nielsen, M. Roendbjerg) – 36:01	2–1
Brinkman (M. Roendbjerg) – 41:09	3–1
From (Mieritz) (ENG) – 59:01	4–1

12 min
Penalties
10 min
32
Shots
19

15 April 2015; 16:30	Hungary	2–7 (1–0, 2–4, 0–3)	Belarus	Főnix Hall, Debrecen; Attendance: 430

Game reference

Gergely Bors
Goalies
Alexander Osipkov
Referee:
(Italy) Daniel Gamper
Linesmen:
(United States) Daniel Cohen
(Denmark) Jonas Reimer

Szita (Stipsicz, Gaspar) – 18:15	1–0
Garat (Szita, Gaspar) – 21:39	2–0
	2–1	23:59 – Alexei Patsenkin (Buinitski)
	2–2	23:59 – Gavrilenko (Borisov)
	2–3	28:11 – Sushko (Buinitski, Alexei Patsenkin) (PP2)
	2–4	31:49 – Alexa. Patsenkin (Shikut)
	2–5	45:59 – Sushko (Shikut, Buinitski) (PP)
	2–6	47:29 – Kutsyr
	2–7	49:43 – Alexei Patsenkin (Sushko, Buinitski) (PP)

24 min
Penalties
22 min
21
Shots
47

15 April 2015; 20:00	Norway	5–3 (1–1, 1–2, 3–0)	Kazakhstan	Főnix Hall, Debrecen; Attendance: 210

Game reference

Jakob Opsahl
Goalies
Christian Kaasastul
Referee:
(United Kingdom) Tom Darnell
Linesmen:
(Ukraine) Artem Korepanov
(Latvia) Kriss Kupcus

	0–1	17:32 – Makeyev (Borisevich)
Gronstad (Jorgensen, Marthinsen) – 17:58	1–1
	1–2	24:05 – Panyukov
	1–3	24:57 – Borisevich (Medvedev, Makeyev)
Petter Gronstad (Gulliksen) (PP) – 38:12	2–3
Granholm (Johannessen, Marthinsen) – 41:48	3–3
Christensen (Ronnild, Karlsen) – 43:09	4–3
Marthinsen (Gronstad) – 50:52	5–3

12 min
Penalties
12 min
36
Shots
30

16 April 2015; 16:30	Belarus	4–0 (3–0, 0–0, 1–0)	France	Főnix Hall, Debrecen; Attendance: 220

Game reference

Alexander Osipkov
Goalies
Raphael Garnier
Quentin Papillon
Referee:
(Latvia) Juris Balodis
Linesmen:
(Latvia) Kriss Kupcus
(Hungary) Botond Palkovi

Shikut (Sushko, Alexei Patsenkin) (PP2) – 02:54	1–0
Sharangovich (Borisov) (PP) – 03:58	2–0
Buinitski (Lukashevich) – 12:28	3–0
Farafontov (Buinitski, Shushko) (ENG) – 58:43	4–0

24 min
Penalties
42 min
25
Shots
30

17 April 2015; 13:00	Kazakhstan	2–5 (0–3, 1–1, 1–1)	Denmark	Főnix Hall, Debrecen; Attendance: 120

Game reference

Nikita Ustinovich
Goalies
Lasse Petersen
Referee:
(Italy) Daniel Gamper
Linesmen:
(United States) Daniel Cohen
(Austria) David Nothegger

	0–1	02:41 – D. Nielsen (Korsgaard, Brinkman)
	0–2	14:57 – From (M. Roendbjerg)
	0–3	18:13 – Korsgaard (D. Nielsen)
Borovikov (Aidash, Solodovnikov) – 25:41	1–3
	1–4	29:58 – Christensen (Weichel, True) (PP)
Panyukov (Tanimov) – 40:28	2–4
	2–5	44:37 – From (D. Nielsen, K. Jensen) (PP)

36 min
Penalties
16 min
22
Shots
34

17 April 2015; 16:30	Norway	4–1 (2–0, 1–1, 1–0)	Hungary	Főnix Hall, Debrecen; Attendance: 270

Game reference

Jakob Opsahl
Jens Kristian Lillegrend
Goalies
Bence Kiss
Referee:
(Poland) Przemyslav Kepa
Linesmen:
(Russia) Yakov Paley
(Denmark) Jonas Reimer

Gulliksen (Karlsen, Christensen) – 01:20	1–0
Granholm (Ellingsen, Noer) – 07:14	2–0
Gulliksen (Jorgensen, Gronstad) (PP) – 30:21	3–0
	3–1	36:57 – Szita (Garat, Stipsicz)
Gronstad (Ellingsen) (ENG) – 59:06	4–1

12 min
Penalties
14 min
36
Shots
21

18 April 2015; 13:00	Kazakhstan	3–6 (1–2, 1–2, 1–2)	Belarus	Főnix Hall, Debrecen; Attendance: 100

Game reference

Nikita Ustinovich
Goalies
Alexander Osipkov
Referee:
(Latvia) Juris Balodis
Linesmen:
(Latvia) Kriss Kupcus
(Hungary) Botond Palkovi

	0–1	14:10 – Sharangovich (Gavrilenko, Alexei Patsenkin)
Demyanov (Dzhangazinov, Parkhomenko) – 15:15	1–1
	1–2	19:23 – Sharangovich (Sushko, Borisov)
	1–3	20:36 – Gavrilenko (Sharangovich)
	1–4	23:53 – Astankov (Sharangovich)
Melikhov (Borisevich) – 28:28	2–4
	2–5	40:51 – Buinitski (Astankov) (PP)
Dzhangazinov – 49:02	3–5
	3–6	58:02 – Sharangovich (ENG)

22 min
Penalties
10 min
22
Shots
47

18 April 2015; 16:25	France	5–2 (2–0, 2–2, 1–0)	Hungary	Főnix Hall, Debrecen; Attendance: 380

Game reference

Quentin Papillon
Goalies
Gergely Bors
Referee:
(United Kingdom) Tom Darnell
Linesmen:
(United States) Daniel Cohen
(Ukraine) Artem Korepanov

Bougro (Gleizes, Maia) – 04:32	1–0
Texier (Guebey, Couvat) – 12:19	2–0
Ville (Colomban, Maia) (PP) – 24:59	3–0
Gleizes (Bougro, Maia) – 26:19	4–0
	4–1	33:31 – P. Kiss
	4–2	39:34 – Nagy (P. Kiss, Stipsicz) (SH)
Texier (Couvat, Fritz-Dreysse) – 55:06	5–2

16 min
Penalties
45 min
51
Shots
24

18 April 2015; 20:00	Denmark	2–1 (0–0, 1–1, 1–0)	Norway	Főnix Hall, Debrecen; Attendance: 280

Game reference

Lasse Petersen
Goalies
Jakob Opsahl
Referee:
(Italy) Daniel Gamper
Linesmen:
(Austria) David Nothegger
(Russia) Yakov Paley

J. Roendbjerg (True, O. Nielsen) – 36:55	1–0
	1–1	37:18 – Noer (Ellingsen, Johannessen)
Krag (Korsgaard) – 56:11	2–1

6 min
Penalties
8 min
28
Shots
24

=== Statistics and awards ===
==== Scoring leaders ====
Pos	Player	Country	GP	G	A	Pts	+/−	PIM
1	Alexei Patsenkin	Belarus	5	3	8	11	+4	0
2	Dmitri Buinitski	Belarus	5	3	7	10	+2	6
3	Tobias Ladehoff	Denmark	5	4	3	7	+4	6
4	Bastien Maia	France	5	2	5	7	0	10
4	Daniel Nielsen	Denmark	5	2	5	7	+5	0
6	Mathias From	Denmark	5	4	2	6	0	0
6	Yegor Sharangovich	Belarus	5	4	2	6	+2	0
8	Petter Gronstad	Norway	5	3	3	6	+1	4
8	Jeppe Korsgaard	Denmark	5	3	3	6	+8	2
10	Ilya Sushko	Belarus	5	2	4	6	+1	18

GP = Games played; G = Goals; A = Assists; Pts = Points; +/− = P Plus–minus; PIM = Penalties In Minutes

Source: IIHF.com

==== Goaltending leaders ====
(minimum 40% team's total ice time)

Pos	Player	Country	TOI	GA	GAA	Sv%	SO
1	Lasse Petersen	Denmark	300:25	8	1.60	93.65	0
2	Alexander Osipkov	Belarus	241:12	7	1.74	92.47	1
3	Jakob Opsahl	Norway	301:20	12	2.39	91.89	0
4	Raphael Garnier	France	194:16	9	2.78	91.43	0
5	Gergely Bors	Hungary	180:00	21	7.00	85.62	0

TOI = Time on ice (minutes:seconds); GA = Goals against; GAA = Goals against average; Sv% = Save percentage; SO = Shutouts

Source: IIHF.com

==== IIHF best player awards ====
- Goaltender: (Belarus) Alexander Osipkov
- Defenceman: (Norway) Andreas Marthinsen
- Forward: (Denmark) Mathias From

== Division I B ==
The Division I B tournament was played in Maribor, Slovenia, from 12 to 18 April 2015.

=== Participants ===
Team	Qualification
Italy	Placed 6th in 2014 Division I A and were relegated
Austria	Placed 2nd in 2014 Division I B
Slovenia	Hosts, placed 3rd in 2014 Division I B
Japan	Placed 4th in 2014 Division I B
Ukraine	Placed 5th in 2014 Division I B
Lithuania	Placed 1st in 2014 Division II A and were promoted

=== Standings ===
Pos	Team	Pld	W	OTW	OTL	L	GF	GA	GD	Pts	Promotion or relegation
1	Austria	5	5	0	0	0	26	6	+20	15	Promoted to the 2016 Division I A
2	Slovenia	5	3	0	1	1	27	21	+6	10	
3	Japan	5	2	1	0	2	16	16	0	8	
4	Ukraine	5	2	0	0	3	13	14	−1	6	
5	Italy	5	1	0	0	4	16	24	−8	3	
6	Lithuania	5	1	0	0	4	8	25	−17	3	Relegated to the 2016 Division II A

Source: IIHF

=== Results ===
All times are local. (Central European Summer Time – UTC+2)

12 April 2015; 13:00	Japan	1–5 (0–4, 0–0, 1–1)	Austria	Tabor Ice Hall, Maribor; Attendance: 347

Game reference

Shotaro Kaneko
Goalies
Dominic Divis
Referee:
(Kazakhstan) Eduard Ibatulin
Linesmen:
(Slovenia) Gaspar-Jaka Zganc
(Belgium) Maarten van der Acker

	0–1	09:17 – Kromp (B. Wolf)
	0–2	12:59 – Kromp (Poschmann, Nussbaumer)
	0–3	16:34 – Haudum (Poschmann, Baltram)
	0–4	17:58 – Haudum (B. Wolf, Winkler) (PP)
Matsui – 42:23	1–4
	1–5	46:07 – Kragl (Kromp, Baltram) (PP)

12 min
Penalties
30 min
19
Shots
22

12 April 2015; 16:30	Lithuania	2–3 (1–1, 1–2, 0–0)	Italy	Tabor Ice Hall, Maribor; Attendance: 339

Game reference

Artur Pavliukov
Goalies
Hannes Treibenreif
Referee:
(Sweden) Robert Hallin
Linesmen:
(United Kingdom) Ally Flockhart
(Belarus) Vasili Kaliada

	0–1	06:30 – Delueg (Dal Sasso) (PP)
Laukaitis (Benilov) (EA) – 08:52	1–1
Bogdziul (Krakauskas) (PP) – 22:29	2–1
	2–2	27:04 – Deluca (Bernard) (PP)
	2–3	31:41 – Pitschieler (Bernard)

12 min
Penalties
4 min
16
Shots
35

12 April 2015; 20:00	Ukraine	3–5 (0–3, 2–1, 1–1)	Slovenia	Tabor Ice Hall, Maribor; Attendance: 627

Game reference

Yuri Krasnopolskiy
Bogdan Dyachenko
Goalies
Mark Vlahovic
Referee:
(Belgium) Chris Deweerdt
Linesmen:
(France) Yann Furet
(Poland) Slawomir Szachniewicz

	0–1	06:15 – Jezovsek
	0–2	07:35 – Jezovsek (Glavic)
	0–3	15:57 – Glavic (Grahut)
	0–4	28:41 – Orehek (Simsic) (SH)
Mazur (Fadieiev) (PP) – 30:55	1–4
Vorona (Nigmatullin) – 34:51	2–4
	2–5	41:10 – Drozg
Nigmatullin (Gerasymenko) – 45:24	3–5

12 min
Penalties
10 min
27
Shots
25

13 April 2015; 13:00	Italy	5–6 (2–1, 2–4, 1–1)	Japan	Tabor Ice Hall, Maribor; Attendance: 350

Game reference

Hannes Treibenreif
Luca Stevan
Goalies
Shotaro Kaneko
Tomoya Numata
Referee:
(Croatia) Trpimir Piragic
Linesmen:
(France) Yann Furet
(Slovenia) Damir Rakovic

Bernard (Delueg) – 02:53	1–0
Moroder (Berger, Bernard) – 08:41	2–0
	2–1	09:47 – Kyoya
	2–2	22:49 – Matsui (Nakayashiki) (PP)
	2–3	23:54 – Konishi
de Lorenzo-Meo (Dal Sasso, Pitshieler) (PP) – 26:32	3–3
	3–4	28:02 – Ikeda
	3–5	32:06 – Funaka
Marzolini (Thum, Dal Sasso) (PP) – 35:53	4–5
	4–6	41:35 – Kirie (Saito, Funaka) (PP)
Delueg (Basso, Dal Sasso) (PP) – 56:54	5–6

10 min
Penalties
10 min
32
Shots
24

13 April 2015; 16:30	Austria	3–2 (0–1, 1–1, 2–0)	Ukraine	Tabor Ice Hall, Maribor; Attendance: 369

Game reference

Dominic Divis
Goalies
Bogdan Dyachenko
Referee:
(Sweden) Robert Hallin
Linesmen:
(Poland) Slawomir Szachniewicz
(Slovenia) Gasper-Jaka Zganc

	0–1	18:49 – Gerasymenko (Aleksandrov)
	0–2	25:18 – Terchiev (Merzhko)
Kromp (Witting) – 33:03	1–2
Kromp (B. Wolf) (PP) – 57:48	2–2
Winkler (Haudum) – 59:08	3–2

33 min
Penalties
16 min
38
Shots
19

13 April 2015; 20:00	Slovenia	10–1 (0–0, 3–1, 7–0)	Lithuania	Tabor Ice Hall, Maribor; Attendance: 679

Game reference

Mark Vlahovic
Goalies
Artur Pavliukov
Elvinas Karla
Referee:
(Kazakhstan) Eduard Ibatulin
Linesmen:
(Belarus) Vasili Kaliada
(Belgium) Maarten van den Acker

Jezovsek – 20:51	1–0
Jezovsek (Simsic) (PP) – 33:01	2–0
	2–1	33:35 – Bogdziul (Krakauskas)
Jeklic (Glavic, Kuzman) (PP) – 39:59	3–1
Orehek (Simsic) – 41:20	4–1
Jeklic (Cepon) (PP) – 47:17	5–1
Simsic (Kapel) – 48:30	6–1
Jezovsek (SH) – 52:29	7–1
Orehek (Cepon, Zorko) (PP2) – 55:45	8–1
Jezovsek (Simsic) (PP2) – 56:23	9–1
Glavic (Zorko, Ulamec) (PP2) – 58:05	10–1

24 min
Penalties
43 min
39
Shots
28

15 April 2015; 13:00	Italy	1–3 (1–0, 0–0, 0–3)	Ukraine	Tabor Ice Hall, Maribor; Attendance: 368

Game reference

Hannes Treibenreif
Goalies
Bogdan Dyachenko
Referee:
(Kazakhstan) Eduard Ibatulin
Linesmen:
(Poland) Slawomir Szachniewicz
(Slovenia) Gaspar-Jaka Zganc

Thum (Spinell) – 16:24	1–0
	1–1	46:35 – Svyshev (Shcherbakov, Nigmatullin) (EA)
	1–2	54:51 – Gerasymenko (Matvienko)
	1–3	59:44 – Gerasymenko (ENG)

6 min
Penalties
2 min
19
Shots
27

15 April 2015; 16:30	Lithuania	2–1 (0–0, 1–0, 1–1)	Japan	Tabor Ice Hall, Maribor; Attendance: 390

Game reference

Artur Pavliukov
Goalies
Shotaro Kaneko
Referee:
(Belgium) Chris Deweerdt
Linesmen:
(Slovenia) Damir Rakovic
(Belgium) Maarten van den Acker

Bucys (Krakauskas, Bogdziul) – 32:22	1–0
Kuzminov (Peliusenok, Zukauskas) – 50:57	2–0
	2–1	52:51 – Nakayashki (Ishibashi)

10 min
Penalties
8 min
26
Shots
24

15 April 2015; 20:00	Austria	6–1 (2–0, 1–0, 3–1)	Slovenia	Tabor Ice Hall, Maribor; Attendance: 681

Game reference

Dominic Divis
Goalies
Mark Vlahovic
Referee:
(Croatia) Trpimir Piragic
Linesmen:
(United Kingdom) Ally Flockhart
(France) Yann Furet

Haudum (Huber) – 07:10	1–0
Baltram (B. Wolf) – 18:37	2–0
Kromp (Poschmann, Baltram) – 29:16	3–0
Poschmann (Kromp, Kragl)	4–0
	4–1	53:23 – Glavic (Jeklic, Zorko) (PP)
Kromp (Baltram) (ENG) – 57:12	5–1
Witting (SH) (ENG) – 59:41	6–1

10 min
Penalties
16 min
21
Shots
29

17 April 2015; 13:00	Austria	7–2 (3–1, 1–1, 3–0)	Lithuania	Tabor Ice Hall, Maribor; Attendance: 379

Game reference

Dominic Divis
Goalies
Artur Pavliukov
Referee:
(Belgium) Chris Deweerdt
Linesmen:
(France) Yann Furet
(Slovenia) Damir Rakovic

Maxa (Winkler) (PP)– 10:22	1–0
Haudum (Wachter, B. Wolf) – 12:28	2–0
Winkler (Haudum) (PP) – 14:36	3–0
	3–1	17:05 – Zukauskas (Kuzminov, Krakauskas)
	3–2	31:45 – Cetvertak (Laukaitis)
Baltram (Kromp) – 38:46	4–2
Winkler (Haudum) – 44:13	5–2
Wappis (Nissner) – 51:26	6–2
Baltram (Moidl) – 59:55	7–2

10 min
Penalties
16 min
44
Shots
18

17 April 2015; 16:30	Japan	4–1 (2–0, 1–0, 1–1)	Ukraine	Tabor Ice Hall, Maribor; Attendance: 369

Game reference

Shotaro Kaneko
Tomoya Numata
Goalies
Yuri Krasnopolskiy
Bogdan Dyachenko
Referee:
(Croatia) Trpimir Piragic
Linesmen:
(United Kingdom) Ally Flockhart
(Belgium) Maarten van den Acker

Saito (Fuanaka, Kon) (PP) – 08:08	1–0
Ikeda (Nakayashiki) (PP) – 18:23	2–0
Nakayashiki – 30:01	3–0
	3–1	42:42 – Mazur (Fadieiev, Grygoryev) (PP)
Sawade (Funaka, Saito) – 49:00	4–1

12 min
Penalties
8 min
15
Shots
34

17 April 2015; 20:00	Slovenia	8–7 (3–0, 3–3, 2–4)	Italy	Tabor Ice Hall, Maribor; Attendance: 604

Game reference

Mark Vlahovic
Goalies
Luca Steven
Hannes Treibenreif
Referee:
(Sweden) Robert Hallin
Linesmen:
(Belarus) Vasili Kaliada
(Poland) Slawomir Szachniewicz

Simsic (Jezovsek) (PP) – 04:53	1–0
Zorko (Drozg) (PP) – 08:46	2–0
Drozg (Jeklic) – 12:41	3–0
Drozg (Cepon) – 24:29	4–0
Glavic (Jeklic, Zorko) (PP) – 27:02	5–0
	5–1	27:35 – Gasser (Delueg)
	5–2	29:47 – Deluca (Pitschieler) (PP)
	5–3	30:36 – de Lorenzo-Meo (Moroder)
Tomazevic (Petek) (PP) – 35:00	6–3
	6–4	48:34 – Spinell (Dal Sasso)
	6–5	50:18 – Thum (Spinell)
Potocnik (Cepon) (PP) – 53:15	7–5
	7–6	54:55 – Bernard (Deluca)
	7–7	55:23 – Spinell (Thum)
Markic (Ulamec – 55:50	8–7

12 min
Penalties
14 min
30
Shots
21

18 April 2015; 13:00	Ukraine	4–1 (2–0, 1–0, 1–1)	Lithuania	Tabor Ice Hall, Maribor; Attendance: 345

Game reference

Bogdan Dyanchenko
Goalies
Artur Pavliukov
Referee:
(Croatia) Trpimir Piragic
Linesmen:
(United Kingdom) Ally Flockhart
(Slovenia) Gasper Jaka Zganc

Fadieiev (Terchiev) – 04:31	1–0
Vorona (Fadieiev, Mazur) – 13:34	2–0
Generalov (Mazur, Vorona) (PP) – 34:45	3–0
	3–1	45:51 – Laukaitis (Bogdziul) (PP)
Terchiev (ENG) – 59:54	4–1

6 min
Penalties
4 min
28
Shots
20

18 April 2015; 16:30	Italy	0–5 (0–3, 0–1, 0–1)	Austria	Tabor Ice Hall, Maribor; Attendance: 412

Game reference

Hannes Treibenreif
Goalies
Marco Simair
Referee:
(Sweden) Robert Hallin
Linesmen:
(Slovenia) Damir Rakovic
(Belgium) Maarten van den Acker

0-1	04:13 – Kromp (Kragl, Baltram) (PP)
0–2	17:42 – B. Wolf (Maxa, Wappis)
0–3	19:13 – Winkler (Jennes, Witting)
0–4	33:15 – B. Wolf (Baltram, S. Wolf)
0–5	58:22 – Wachter (Winkler)

10 min
Penalties
6 min
13
Shots
33

18 April 2015; 20:00	Slovenia	3–4 GWS (1–1, 0–1, 2–1) (OT 0–0) (SO: 0–1)	Japan	Tabor Ice Hall, Maribor; Attendance: 575

Game reference

Tilen Spreitzer
Goalies
Shotaro Kaneko
Referee:
(Belgium) Chris Deweerdt
Linesmen:
(France) Yann Furet
(Belarus) Vaili Kaliada

Tomazevic (Markic) – 01:59	1–0
	1–1	04:58 – Nakayashiki (Ikeda)
	1–2	26:22 – Sawade (Saito)
	1–3	41:55 – Ishibashi (Ikeda)
Drozg (Zorko, Cepon) (PP) – 45:10	2–3
Jezovsek (Mercina) – 55:38	3–3

Jezovsek (miss)
Simsic (miss)
Shootout
(miss) Nakayashiki
T. Kaneko
Shimizu
2 min
Penalties
4 min
23
Shots
28

=== Statistics and awards ===
==== Scoring leaders ====
Pos	Player	Country	GP	G	A	Pts	+/−	PIM
1	Christof Kromp	Austria	5	7	3	10	+9	4
2	Florian Baltram	Austria	5	3	6	9	+6	2
3	Zan Jezovsek	Slovenia	5	7	1	8	–2	4
4	Lukas Haudum	Austria	5	4	3	7	+5	10
5	Nik Simsic	Slovenia	5	2	5	7	–2	14
5	Bernd Wolf	Austria	5	2	5	7	+8	4
7	Jan Drozg	Slovenia	5	4	2	6	+5	0
7	Gasper Glavic	Slovenia	5	4	2	6	+3	14
9	Matic Jeklic	Slovenia	5	3	3	6	+1	4
9	Dario Winkler	Austria	5	3	3	6	+5	0

GP = Games played; G = Goals; A = Assists; Pts = Points; +/− = P Plus–minus; PIM = Penalties In Minutes

Source: IIHF.com

==== Goaltending leaders ====
(minimum 40% team's total ice time)

Pos	Player	Country	TOI	GA	GAA	Sv%	SO
1	Dominic Divis	Austria	240:00	6	1.50	92.94	0
2	Bogdan Dyachenko	Ukraine	251:54	10	2.38	90.48	0
3	Shotaro Kaneko	Japan	247:59	13	3.15	87.96	0
4	Artur Pavliukov	Belarus	286:40	20	4.19	87.80	0
5	Mark Vlahovic	Slovenia	238:46	15	3.77	84.21	0

TOI = Time on ice (minutes:seconds); GA = Goals against; GAA = Goals against average; Sv% = Save percentage; SO = Shutouts

Source: IIHF.com

==== IIHF best player awards ====
- Goaltender: (Austria) Dominic Divis
- Defenceman: (Slovenia) Mark Cepon
- Forward: (Austria) Christof Kromp
