= 2022 Deutschland Cup =

Tournament details
- Host country: Germany
- Venue: 1 (in 1 host city)
- Dates: 10–13 November
- Teams: 4

Final positions
- Champions: Germany (9th title)
- Runners-up: Austria
- Third place: Denmark
- Fourth place: Slovakia

Tournament statistics
- Games played: 6
- Goals scored: 27 (4.5 per game)
- Attendance: 12,980 (2,163 per game)
- Scoring leader: (Denmark) Mathias From (3 points)

The 2022 Deutschland Cup was the 33rd edition of the tournament, held between 10 and 13 November 2022.

== Standings ==
Pos	Team	Pld	W	OTW	OTL	L	GF	GA	GD	Pts
1st place, gold medalist(s)	Germany	3	2	1	0	0	9	2	+7	8
2nd place, silver medalist(s)	Austria	3	1	1	0	1	6	6	0	5
3rd place, bronze medalist(s)	Denmark	3	0	1	1	1	7	9	−2	3
4	Slovakia	3	0	0	2	1	5	10	−5	2

Source: IIHF
Rules for classification: 1) points; 2) head-to-head points; 3) head-to-head goal difference; 4) head-to-head number of goals scored.

== Results ==
All times are local (UTC+1).

10 November 2022; 16:15	Austria	3–2 OT (1–1, 1–0, 0–1) (OT: 1–0)	Slovakia	Yayla Arena, Krefeld; Attendance: 830

Game reference

David Kickert
Goalies
Denis Godla
Referees:
(Germany) Benjamin Hoppe
(Germany) Gordon Schukies
Linesmen:
(Germany) Tim Heffner
(Germany) Jonas Merten

	0–1	14:51 – Beňo
Wolf (Gaffal) – 18:44	1–1
Heinrich (Thaler) (PP) – 23:15	2–1
	2–2	54:51 – Holešinský
Haudum (Maier, Kasper) – 60:32	3–2

2 min
Penalties
10 min
22
Shots
36

10 November 2022; 19:45	Germany	3–2 OT (1–1, 1–1, 0–0) (OT: 1–0)	Denmark	Yayla Arena, Krefeld; Attendance: 1,680

Game reference

Dustin Strahlmeier
Goalies
Frederik Dichow
Referees:
(Czech Republic) Martin Fraňo
(Germany) Marian Rohatsch
Linesmen:
(Germany) Joshua Römer
(Germany) Tobias Schwenk

Michaelis (Ugbekile, Wohlgemuth) – 15:09	1–0
	1–1	18:56 – Koch (Eller, K. Jensen)
	1–2	25:49 – Meyer (Aagaard, From) (PP)
Schmölz (Blank, Karrer) – 32:47	2–2
Schmölz (A. Eder, Schinko) – 63:30	3–2

2 min
Penalties
2 min
30
Shots
27

12 November 2022; 14:30	Slovakia	3–4 OT (0–2, 2–1, 1–0) (OT: 0–1)	Denmark	Yayla Arena, Krefeld; Attendance: 1,706

Game reference

Dominik Riečický
Goalies
Frederik Dichow
Referees:
(Germany) Kilian Hinterdobler
(Germany) Gordon Schukies
Linesmen:
(Germany) Yannik Koziol
(Germany) Tobias Schwenk

	0–1	11:15 – From (Poulsen)
	0–2	15:39 – Poulsen (Larsen, Aagaard)
	0–3	23:20 – K. Jensen (Weichel, Aagaard)
Čacho (Koch, Lunter) – 29:28	1–3
Fominych (Grman) – 37:33	2–3
Čacho (Lunter, Rosandič) – 55:22	3–3
	3–4	61:11 – From

4 min
Penalties
4 min
45
Shots
15

12 November 2022; 18:00	Germany	3–0 (2–0, 1–0, 0–0)	Austria	Yayla Arena, Krefeld; Attendance: 3,310

Game reference

Dustin Strahlmeier
Goalies
David Kickert
Referees:
(Czech Republic) Martin Fraňo
(Germany) Benjamin Hoppe
Linesmen:
(Germany) Tim Heffner
(Germany) Jonas Merten

A. Eder (Tiffels, Michaelis) – 05:45	1–0
T. Eder (Tiffels, A. Eder) (PP) – 17:26	2–0
Leonhardt (Ehl, Schütz) – 28:34	3–0

25 min
Penalties
29 min
32
Shots
24

13 November 2022; 11:00	Denmark	1–3 (1–1, 0–1, 0–1)	Austria	Yayla Arena, Krefeld; Attendance: 1,600

Game reference

Georg Sørensen
Goalies
David Madlener
Referees:
(Germany) Kilian Hinterdobler
(Germany) Marian Rohatsch
Linesmen:
(Germany) Yannik Koziol
(Germany) Tobias Schwenk

	0–1	11:42 – Stefan Gaffal (Lukas Kainz, Ramon Schnetzer)
Christian Wejse (Felix Schee, Anders Koch) (PP) – 17:53	1–1
	1–2	28:34 – Lukas Haudum (Schnetzer)
	1–3	47:24 – Marco Kasper (Florian Baltram, David Reinbacher) (PP)

12 min
Penalties
32 min
31
Shots
21

13 November 2022; 14:30	Germany	3–0 (1–0, 1–0, 1–0)	Slovakia	Yayla Arena, Krefeld; Attendance: 3,854

Game reference

Mirko Pantkowski
Goalies
Dominik Riečický
Referees:
(Czech Republic) Martin Fraňo
(Germany) Gordon Schukies
Linesmen:
(Germany) Jonas Merten
(Germany) Joshua Römer

Wohlgemuth (Schinko, Zimmermann) (PP) – 06:20	1–0
T. Eder (Bokk, Hüttl) (PP) – 30:50	2–0
Fleischer (EN) – 59:46	3–0

6 min
Penalties
8 min
27
Shots
39
