= Dominik Bernard =

French actor

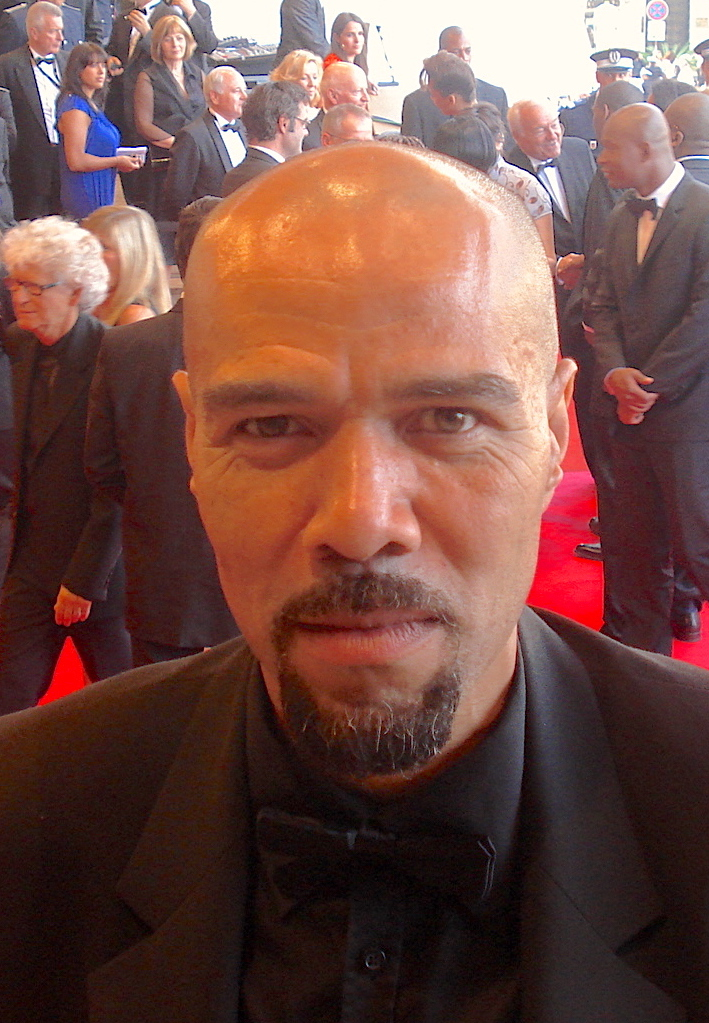
- Bernard on the red carpet at the Cannes Film Festival in May 2008.
- Born: Pointe-à-Pitre, Guadeloupe
- Occupations: Actor; stage director; film director
- Years active: 1983–present

Dominik Bernard, born in Pointe-à-Pitre, is a French stage and film actor and a director of Guadeloupean origin. He is also the French voice for many American actors, such as Dwayne "The Rock" Johnson, Courtney B. Vance, Dennis Haysbert, Jeffrey Wright and Chiwetel Ejiofor.

== Selected filmography ==
Year	Title	Director	Role	Notes
1996	Inseln unter dem wind	Marco Serafini		TV series (ZDF/Season 2, 2 episodes)
1997	The Swindle (French: Rien ne va plus)	Claude Chabrol		Feature Film
1998	Sucre Amer	Christian Lara	Général Sériziat	Feature Film
2000	Antilles sur Seine	Pascal Légitimus		Feature Film
2003	La Fonte des neiges	Laurent Jaoui	The African diplomat	TV film
2004	Siméon	Euzhan Palcy		Feature Film
2004	Lien	Thomas Proux	Toad	Short Film
2005	La Noiraude	Fabienne Kanor & Véronique Kanor	The Marabout	Short Film
2007	Dix films pour en parler	Laurence Ferreira Barbosa	The Medical Examiner	TV series short (1 Episode: The Medical Examiner)
2008	Bientôt j'arrête	Léa Fazer	Ted	Short Film, Talents Cannes
2009	Un Flic	Patrick Dewolf	Miloud	TV series (France 2/Season 3, episode 3: Dancers)
2009	Syd	Fabien Gazanhes	Syd's Father	Short Film
2011	Death in Paradise	Charles Palmer	Bank manager	TV series (Episode 1.1)
2011	Domino	Sébastien Chambard		TV series short (season 1, 1 Episode)
2014	Villa Karayib	Gwendal Pointeau	Rosan	TV series short (season 2, Recurring role)
2015	Domino a Kaz	Gilbert Di Nino, Selim Isker	Hubert (Laurence's Dad)	TV series short (season 3, 6 episodes)
2015	Nightmare Before Wedding	Fabienne Chomaud	The Mad Hatter	Short Film
2016	San Konbin	Samuel Tanda	Commissioner Marcel Romarin	Short Film

=== Music video appearances ===
Title	Year	Performer	Album	Ref.
"Que restera-t-il ?"	2008	Johnny Hallyday	Le Cœur d'un homme	
"Parle-moi"	2014	Lady Sweety	Parle-moi	,

== Stage ==
=== Actor ===
Year	Show	Director	Role	Venue
1998	Blood Knot (Athol Fugard)	Jean-Michel Martial	Morris	L'Artchipel, Théâtre de la Tempête (Paris)
1999	The Double Inconstancy (Marivaux)	Éric-Gaston Lorvoire	Trivelino	Lucernaire theatre
2000–2002	King Lear	Philippe Adrien	Oswald	Théâtre de la Tempête (Paris)
2002	The Exception and the Rule (Bertolt Brecht)	Alain Ollivier	The guide	Théâtre Gérard Philipe (Saint-Denis)
2003	Œdipe ou la controverse (from Sophocles)	Sotigui Kouyaté	Creon	Théâtre des Bouffes du Nord (Paris)
2003	Monsieur Toussaint (Édouard Glissant)	Greg Germain	François Mackandal	Fort de Joux : Bicentennial of Toussaint Louverture’s death
2003	Traffic jam (French: Embouteillage)	Anne-Laure Liégeois		Grande Halle de la Villette (Paris)
2004	Miss Julie (by August Strindberg)	Pierre-Marie Carlier	Jean	Théâtre Daniel Sorano (Vincennes)
2005	Africa-Solo (Ernest Pépin)	José Exélis		Théâtre de la Tempête (Paris)
2005	Sturm & Tempête (from Shakespeare)	Alex Novak	Prospero	L’Illiade Theatre (Illkirch-Graffenstaden), Reithalle (Offenburg)
2005	A Creole Respectable Wedding (from Bertolt Brecht)	Philippe Adrien	The Bridegroom's Friend	L'Artchipel, Avignon Festival
2006	Abribus (Laurent Van Wetter)	Hassane Kassi Kouyaté		La Scène Watteau (Nogent-sur-Marne)
2006	A Creole Respectable Wedding (from Bertolt Brecht)	Philippe Adrien	The Bridegroom's Friend	Théâtre de la Tempête (Paris)
2007	Murders of the Jewish princess (Armando Llamas)	Philippe Adrien		Théâtre de la Tempête (Paris)
2008	Crave (Sarah Kane)	Ludovic Lagarde		Festival d'automne à Paris : Théâtre de la Cité internationale
2010–2011	Lucy (from Catherine Rey)	Valérie Goma	Julio	French Guiana, Suriname, Brazil, Avignon Festival 2011
2011	Conger eel and Homarus (French: Congre et Homard) (Gaël Octavia)	Dominik Bernard	Conger	Scène nationale de Martinique, L'Artchipel, Avignon Festival
2012–2014	Un archipel de Solitudes (Frantz Succab)	José Jernidier	Tic	L'Artchipel, Avignon Festival
2014	Le Temps suspendu de Thuram (Véronique Kanor)	Alain Timár	Eugene	L'Artchipel, Théâtre des Halles : Avignon Festival

=== Stage director ===
Year	Show	Author	Venue
2009	Adélaïde, a negro tragedy	Solal Valentin	Théâtre de l’Épée de Bois (La Cartoucherie, Paris)
2011	Conger eel and Homarus (French: Congre et Homard)	Gaël Octavia	Scène nationale of Martinique, L'Artchipel, Avignon Festival 2011
2018	Happy Birthday Marta	José Jernidier	L'Artchipel, Scène nationale of Guadeloupe

== Voxography ==
=== French Radio dramas ===
Year	Station	Show	Author	Notes
2007	France Culture	Le monde tel quel, une aventure de Sam Collette	Christine Spianti	Radio drama, Role: Bakari
2007	France Inter	Rosa Parks, la femme qui a dit non	Anne Jolivet	Radio drama, Role: Raymond Parks
2007	France Culture	American Darling	Russell Banks	Radio drama series, Role: Samuel Doe
2008	France Culture	Zeno's Conscience	Italo Svevo	Radio drama series
2003	RFO Guadeloupe	Conger eel and Homarus (French: Congre et Homard)	Gaël Octavia	Radio drama, director, Role: Conger
