= David Reinbacher =

Austrian ice hockey player (born 2004)

- Born: 25 October 2004 (age 21) Hohenems, Austria
- Height: 6 ft 3 in (191 cm)
- Weight: 209 lb (95 kg; 14 st 13 lb)
- Position: Defence
- Shoots: Right
- NHL team (P) Cur. team Former teams: Montreal Canadiens; Laval Rocket (AHL); EHC Kloten
- National team: Austria
- NHL draft: 5th overall, 2023; Montreal Canadiens
- Playing career: 2022–present

David Reinbacher (born 25 October 2004) is an Austrian professional ice hockey player who is a defenceman for the Laval Rocket in the American Hockey League (AHL) as a prospect under contract to the Montreal Canadiens of the National Hockey League (NHL). He was selected in the first round, fifth overall, by the Canadiens in the 2023 NHL entry draft, making him the highest-drafted Austrian player in NHL history along with Thomas Vanek in 2003.

== Playing career ==
=== Switzerland ===
As a youth, Reinbacher played in Switzerland with EHC Rheintal and EHC Bülach, before moving to EHC Kloten at the U15 level. Initially appearing within the team's junior ranks, he made his professional debut with the club in the Swiss League (SL), the second tier of the Swiss league system, midway through the 2021–22 season. Reinbacher managed one goal and 10 assists in 27 regular season appearances. He then played in 14 postseason games, which culminated in Kloten securing promotion to the National League (NL), Switzerland's top league.

In the 2022–23 season, Reinbacher established himself a regular on Kloten's blueline, attracting attention for doing so as an 18-year-old player, and seeing his average ice time rise from six minutes per game to over 20. He recorded three goals and 19 assists in 46 games during the regular season, and two further points in three postseason games. He would go on to win the league's award for the best young player of the year.

Reinbacher initially had a low profile among evaluators prior to the 2023 NHL entry draft, with some European evaluators identifying him as a potential second-round selection. By November 2022, he was receiving attention from major North American publications, with The Hockey News naming him to their "All-Sleeper Squad" of players who should be considered for the first round. At the time of the draft in June, Reinbacher was mooted as a top ten selection by many, and generally considered likely to be the first defenceman taken during proceedings. Ultimately, he was selected fifth overall by the Montreal Canadiens, with team general manager Kent Hughes describing him as "a diamond in the rough with a lot of potential." This made Reinbacher the highest-drafted Austrian skater in NHL history, alongside Thomas Vanek, who was also drafted fifth overall 20 years earlier. The Canadiens' decision was controversial due to their passing over Matvei Michkov, considered by many to be the most talented player still available at the time, who was subsequently taken by the Philadelphia Flyers. Criticism on social media attracted sports media coverage, notably due to reported abusive messages directed at Reinbacher himself.

On 5 July 2023, the Canadiens signed Reinbacher to a three-year, entry-level contract. After what was generally considered a positive appearance at the Canadiens' training camp in the autumn of 2023, he was sent back to EHC Kloten for the 2023–24 NL season. In the midst of a difficult campaign for the team overall, Reinbacher produced one goal and ten assists in 35 appearances, having missed sporadic time due to injury.

=== North America ===
Following the end of the NL schedule, Reinbacher was assigned to the Laval Rocket, the Canadiens' American Hockey League (AHL) affiliate, on 18 March 2024. He made his AHL debut thereafter on 22 March in a 3–2 overtime win versus the Belleville Senators, recording a goal. In eleven games with Laval, he registered two goals and three assists along with a plus–minus differential of +6.

While competing with the Canadiens in exhibition play against the Toronto Maple Leafs on 28 September 2024, Reinbacher exited the game after a hit by Leafs defenceman Marshall Rifai. Days later, it was announced that he had undergone knee surgery, and would miss five-to-six months of the 2024–25 season. Reinbacher ultimately made his season debut with the Rocket on 19 February 2025 versus the Manitoba Moose, and appeared in 23 total games during the 2024–25 AHL season, including participating in his team's deep run to the Eastern Conference Final of the Calder Cup playoffs.

Prior to the beginning of the 2025–26 season, Reinbacher was sidelined yet again after suffering a broken metacarpal in an exhibition game against the Leafs on 25 September 2025. On 31 October, he made his first AHL appearance in a game against the Rochester Americans. Through 57 games played with the Rocket, Reinbacher recorded five goals and 19 assists. After a late season injury to Canadiens defenceman Noah Dobson, he was recalled by the team and made his NHL debut on 12 April 2026 against the New York Islanders, recording his first NHL point, an assist, in a 4–1 victory. After appearing in the final two games of the regular season, Reinbacher remained on Montreal's roster through the first four games of the 2026 Stanley Cup playoffs, but did not see game action. He was then returned to Laval for the start of the 2026 Calder Cup playoffs.

Reinbacher was generally credited with a strong performance in the Canadiens' 2026 preseason competition, but on 27 September he was sent down to commence the 2026–27 season with the Laval Rocket. Following injuries to the Canadiens' defence corps, he was recalled to the roster, and made his season debut on 17 October against the Buffalo Sabres.

== Personal life ==
Reinbacher's father, Harald, is a former professional hockey player for EHC Lustenau of the Alps Hockey League (AlpsHL). He has one sibling, a brother named Tobias, who also plays professionally for the Pioneers Vorarlberg of the ICE Hockey League.

== International play ==
Medal record

Men's ice hockey

Representing Austria

Deutschland Cup
Silver medal – second place	2022 Germany	

Internationally, Reinbacher first represented the Austrian under-18 national team at the 2022 IIHF World U18 Championship. Shortly thereafter, he was named to the Austrian junior national team for the annual World Junior Championships. In November 2022, Reinbacher made his debut with the Austrian senior national team at that year's Deutschland Cup, capturing a silver medal.

The following year, he averaged over 26 minutes of ice time per game at the 2023 World Junior Championships, and had two assists in his team's final tournament game, which saw them relegated following two consecutive losses to Latvia. At the ensuing IIHF World Championship, he would suffer an MCL injury in Austria's second game against Sweden and subsequently miss three games. Despite this, Reinbacher returned to play 23 minutes in the final group stage game against Hungary and help his country avoid relegation.

== Career statistics ==
=== Regular season and playoffs ===
			Regular season					Playoffs
Season	Team	League	GP	G	A	Pts	PIM	GP	G	A	Pts	PIM
2020–21	Kloten U20	U20-Elit	25	1	3	4	16	—	—	—	—	—
2021–22	Kloten U20	U20-Elit	23	9	13	22	12	3	0	1	1	2
2021–22	EHC Kloten	SL	27	1	10	11	4	14	0	0	0	10
2022–23	EHC Kloten	NL	46	3	19	22	26	3	1	1	2	2
2023–24	EHC Kloten	NL	35	1	10	11	18	—	—	—	—	—
2023–24	Laval Rocket	AHL	11	2	3	5	4	—	—	—	—	—
2024–25	Laval Rocket	AHL	10	2	3	5	10	13	2	4	6	14
2025–26	Laval Rocket	AHL	57	5	19	24	56	4	0	0	0	0
2025–26	Montreal Canadiens	NHL	2	0	1	1	0	—	—	—	—	—
NL totals			81	4	29	33	44	3	1	1	2	2
NHL totals			2	0	1	1	0	—	—	—	—	—

=== International ===
Year	Team	Event	Result	GP	G	A	Pts	PIM
2022	Austria	U18 D1B	5th	5	0	1	1	0
2022	Austria	WJC	10th	4	0	2	2	4
2022	Austria	DC	2nd place, silver medalist(s)	3	0	1	1	0
2023	Austria	WJC	10th	5	0	2	2	0
2023	Austria	WC	14th	4	0	1	1	2
Junior totals				14	0	5	5	4
Senior totals				7	0	2	2	2

== Awards and honours ==
Award	Year	Ref
Swiss League
Swiss League championship	2022	
National League
Young Player of the Year	2023	

Awards and achievements
Preceded by Filip Mešár	Montreal Canadiens first-round draft pick 2023	Succeeded by Ivan Demidov
