= Gaël Octavia =

French playwright, writer, and artist

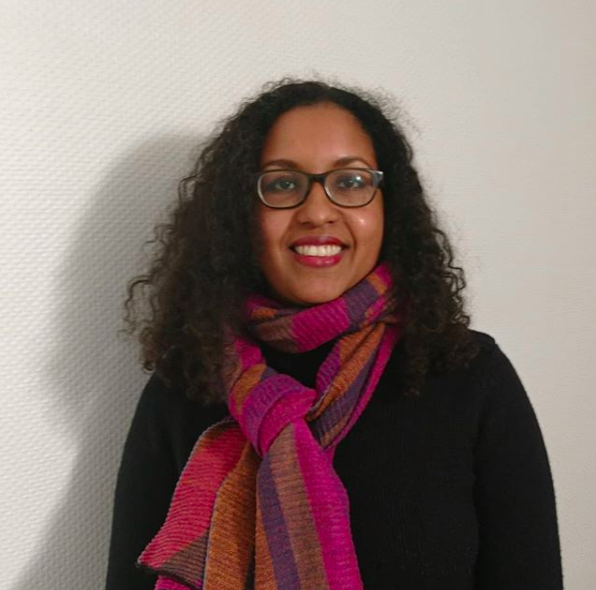
- Born: 29 December 1977 (age 48); Fort de France, Martinique
- Occupations: Writer, playwright
- Writing career
- Language: French
- Genres: Theatre, Literature, Visual Art
- Notable works: Congre et homard (Play, 2012); Cette guerre que nous n'avons pas faite (Play, 2014); La fin de Mame Baby (Novel, 2017); La bonne histoire de Madeleine Démétrius (Novel, 2020)
- Notable awards: Prix Goncourt de la nouvelle 2025

Gaël Octavia (born 29 December 1977 in Fort-de-France, Martinique), is a French writer and playwright. She is also a film director and painter. In May 2025, she was awarded the Prix Goncourt de la nouvelle for her collection of short stories, L'étrangeté de Mathilde T.

== Biography ==
Gaël Octavia grew up on a council estate in Schœlcher, where she was greatly influenced by her parents. Her mother would tell the story of Octavia's grandmother, who fell in love with a married man. When he died, she was left alone to raise her children, destitute and excluded. This family story captivated Gaël Octavia, who retold it in Ma Parole. After studying at the Lycée Victor-Schœlcher, she obtained her baccalaureate in 1995 and left Martinique to settle in Paris to study. She studied at the lycée Fénelon in Paris and then at a prestigious engineering school.

After graduating with a degree in engineering, she worked in telecommunications. In 2002, she started writing for Tangente, a popular mathematics magazine. She also became head of communications for Fondation Sciences Mathématiques de Paris.

Gaël Octavia's abilities blend the mathematical and the artistic. Her favourite means of expression are painting, film making, and above all, literary writing.

== Writing ==
While being influenced by Martinique, Gaël Octavia's writing deals with broad issues: the family, the status of women, social exclusion and migration.

Cultural organisations working to promote Caribbean theatre recognised Octavia's work early on. In 2003, actor Greg Germain chose her first play, Le Voyage, for a reading in his theatre at the Chapelle du Verbe Incarné in Avignon. The following year, Congre et homard, another play, was selected by the reading committee of Textes en Paroles, an association based in Guadeloupe working to promote contemporary Caribbean theatrical writing. In 2005, Moisson d'avril, a portrait of a power-seeking but conflicted politician, was broadcast on RFO Martinique under the title "Ça y est!". Gaël Octavia's plays have been staged in France, Democratic Republic of the Congo, across the West Indies and in the United States.

In 2009, her first book, Le Voyage, was published by the New York publisher RivartiCollection.

The first of her plays to be staged, Congre et homard, is a story told between a fisherman and the young man working for him, the third character being the fisherman's wife, who never appears. It was premiered in 2010 by the Guadeloupean director Dominik Bernard, as part of the first edition of the Cap Excellence en Théâtre Festival. After a tour of the Caribbean, in Guadeloupe, Haiti, Martinique and Guyana, the play was performed during the 2011 Avignon Festival, before being published the following year by Lansman, under the Etc Caraibe label. Cette guerre que nous n'avons pas faite, a dialogue between a soldier and his mother, was premiered in 2017 by Luc Clémentin at the Scène nationale de Martinique, Tropiques Atrium, and was performed in Martinique, Guadeloupe, Paris and Reunion. La fin de Mame Baby is a story of four women narrated by Aline, a home care nurse just returned to her neighbourhood, after fleeing it seven years before. It won the prix Wepler in 2017. It has been said that in her two novels, she dismantles the myth of the poto mitan, the woman as pillar of Martinique society, saying herself of the idea: "culpabilise les femmes et dédouane les hommes", that it places a burden of responsibility on women, while exculpating men.

Rhapsodie was premiered in 2020 by Abdon Fortuné Koumbha at the Centre Culturel Municipal Jean Gagnant, in Limoges, as part of their autumn theatre festival. In December 2021, her work Une vie familiale was performed in English as Family at Molière in the Park, an outdoor theatre festival held in Prospect Park, a "dream-like" play of a closeted husband and wife, trapped by their need to keep up appearances.

In May 2025, she was awarded the Goncourt Prize for a collection of short stories, L'étrangeté de Mathilde T.

== Works ==
=== Novels ===
- La Fin de Mame Baby, Paris, Éditions Gallimard, 2017
- La Bonne Histoire de Madeleine Démétrius, Paris, Éditions Gallimard, 2020

=== Plays ===
- 2003 : Un procès équitable (unpublished)
- 2004 : Moisson d’avril (unpublished text): reading on the radio station, RFO Martinique in January 2005
- 2009 : Le voyage. RivartiCollection. 2009. p. 97. ISBN 978-0-9786614-5-8.
- 2008 : Une vie familiale (unpublished): Special mention from the jury of the ETC_Caraïbes/Association Beaumarchais-SACD competition in 2009
- 2012 : Congre et homard. Lansman éditeur, Collection: Théâtre à vif. 2012. p. 48. ISBN 978-2-87282-873-9.
- 2012 : Séraphin, péri en mer., radio drama premiered on Guadeloupe Première
- 2014 : Cette guerre que nous n'avons pas faite. Lansman éditeur, Collection: Théâtre à vif. 2012. p. 36. ISBN 978-2-8071-0003-9.
- 2014 : Les vieilles (unpublished): Finaliste du Prix des Inédits d'Afrique et Outremer (Prix lycéen de littérature dramatique francophone) 2016
- 2017 : Grizzly (unpublished): Finalist in the competition for the Prix Annick Lansman 2018
- 2020 : Rhapsodie. Lansman éditeur. 2020. p. 60. ISBN 978-2-8071-0297-2.

=== Short fiction ===
- 2013 : Kalashnikov Bébé, in Les animaux sauvages, Le Texte Vivant, 2013, free download from iTunes
- 2014 : Deux petites Indiennes, in revue IntranQu’îllités no. 3, 2014 ISBN 978-99970-61-03-4
- 2015 : Nez d'aigle, dents d'ivoire, in Volcaniques : une anthologie du plaisir, edited by Léonora Miano. ISBN 978-2-89712-272-0
- 2017 : L'homme aux dents pointues, in Fanm kon Flanm, anthology edited by Nicole Cage, Cimarron Editions ISBN 979-1-09-715800-2
- 2018 : L'étrangeté de Mathilde T., in Nouvelle Revue Française no. 630, May 2018, Gallimard, ISBN 2072790948
- 2018 : L'enfant du pays, in Chroniques des îles du vent, Sépia/K. Editions ISBN 979-10-334-0141-4
- 2020 : L'irradiant, in IntranQu’îllités no. 5, 2020 ISBN 979-10-307-0339-9
- 2021 : Pour une algorithmique de la Relation, in Nouvelle Revue Française no. 646, January 2021, Gallimard ISBN 2072930375
- 2025 : L'étrangeté de Mathilde T., Gallimard: Continents noirs. ISBN 9782073100139

=== Poetry ===
- 2013 : Beau monde, in the journal L'Incertain no.1, K.Editions, 2013, ISBN 2918141291
- 2014 : Le chien de Varkala, in the journal L'Incertain no. 4, K.Editions, 2014, ISBN 2918141488
- 2018 : Cantique, Paradis, Rosaline and other poems, in the journal WIP. Littérature sans filtre no. 2, Khartala, May 2018, ISBN 2811119868

=== Filmography ===
Short films

- 2006 : Kidnappeur et kidnappeuse (14 min; script writer, filmmaker and editor).
- 2007 : La plus belle conquête de l’homme (6 min 46 s; script writer, filmmaker and editor), with cast: Vincent Byrd-Lesage, Lydie Selebran, Mike Ibrahim, Don Pablo, Franck Salin…
- 2008 : Vélib’ (6 min 08 s; script writer, filmmaker and editor), avec Isabelle Mayeko et Raphaël Lévy.
- 2009 : Cocktail (8 min 40 s; script writer and filmmaker), with cast: Vincent Byrd-Lesage, Caroline Rochefort, Céline Creux-Thomas, Véronique Sambin.

== Prizes and awards ==
- 2009 : Special mention from the jury of the ETC_Caraïbes/Association Beaumarchais-SACD competition in 2009, for Une vie familiale
- 2013 : Prix du meilleur texte francophone Etc Caraïbes/Association Beaumarchais-SACD, for Cette guerre que nous n'avons pas faite
- 2016 : Finalist in the Prix des Inédits d'Afrique et Outremer (High school prize for French-language dramatic literature), for Les vieilles
- 2017 : Prix Wepler, Special mention from the jury, for La fin de Mame Baby
- 2017 : Finalist in the Prix Carbet de la Caraïbe, for La fin de Mame Baby
- 2018 : Finalist in the Prix Annick Lansman, for Grizzly
- 2018 : Finalist in the Prix Jeune Mousquetaire du Premier Roman, for La fin de Mame Baby
- 2018 : Finalist in the Prix Régine Deforges, for La fin de Mame Baby

== Bibliography ==
- Notre Librairie (CulturesSud) no. 162 : Théâtres contemporains du Sud 1990-2006, pp. 146 to 149. Paris-France, 2006.
- Gaël Octavia : une écriture de femme antillaise qui a grandi au contact d'autres femmes antillaises, interview with Gaël Octavia, by Stéphanie Bérard, in Africultures no. 80-81, Emergences Caraïbe(s) : une création théâtrale archipélique, pp. 247 to 253. Paris-France, 2010. ISBN 978-2-296-10351-1
- Scènes et détours zoologiques : Les détours animaliers des écritures contemporaines, Université d'été des Théâtres d'Outre-Mer in Avignon (TOMA), Laboratoire SeFeA de l'Institut de recherche en études théâtrales - Sorbonne Nouvelle.
- Coulisses, No. 42 : Racine : Théâtre et émotion, pp. 121 to 131. Presses universitaires de Franche-Comté. Paris-France, 2011. ISBN 2-84867-316-8
