= Simon Pitschieler =

Italian ice hockey player

- Born: 3 December 1997 (age 28) Bolzano, Italy
- Height: 1.80 m (5 ft 11 in)
- Weight: 81 kg (179 lb; 12 st 11 lb)
- Position: Centre
- Shoots: Left
- AlpsHL team Former teams: HC Bozen–Bolzano; Wipptal Broncos; HC Gherdëina; Val di Fiemme
- National team: Italy
- NHL draft: Undrafted
- Playing career: 2015–present

Simon Pitschieler (born 3 December 1997) is an Italian ice hockey player for HC Bozen–Bolzano and the Italian national team.

He represented Italy at the 2021 IIHF World Championship.
