= A Respectable Wedding =

1919 play by Bertolt Brecht

A Respectable Wedding is a short play by the German dramatist Bertolt Brecht, written in 1919 and first performed on 11 December 1926 at the Schauspielhaus Frankfurt under its original title Die Hochzeit (The Wedding). Brecht changed the title a short time later to Die Kleinbürgerhochzeit (The Petit Bourgeois Wedding).

Like others of Brecht's early works (Baal, Drums in the Night, and The Threepenny Opera), A Respectable Wedding is seen as a critique of bourgeois society.

The play includes nine characters:

- The Bridegroom's Mother
- The Bride's Father
- The Bride
- The Bridegroom
- The Young Man
- The Bride's Sister
- The Woman
- The Man
- The Friend
