= Morten Jensen (ice hockey) =

Danish ice hockey player

- Born: 1 March 1997 (age 29) Esbjerg, Denmark
- Height: 6 ft 0 in (183 cm)
- Weight: 181 lb (82 kg; 12 st 13 lb)
- Position: Defence
- Shoots: Left
- EIHL team Former teams: Belfast Giants; Rögle BK; HC Pustertal; Rungsted Seier Capital
- National team: Denmark
- Playing career: 2015–present

Morten Jensen (born 1 March 1997) is a Danish professional ice hockey defenceman currently playing for Belfast Giants of the Elite Ice Hockey League (UK).

== Career statistics ==
=== Regular season and playoffs ===
			Regular season					Playoffs
Season	Team	League	GP	G	A	Pts	PIM	GP	G	A	Pts	PIM
2010–11	Esbjerg U17	Denmark U17	18	1	1	2	8	—	—	—	—	—
2011–12	Esbjerg U17	Denmark U17	11	2	0	2	16	—	—	—	—	—
2012–13	Esbjerg U17	Denmark U17	13	6	6	12	39	6	7	2	9	4
2012–13	Esbjerg IK	Denmark2	18	4	4	8	8	5	0	3	3	0
2013–14	Rögle BK J18	J18 Elit	20	4	9	13	10	—	—	—	—	—
2013–14	Rögle BK J18	J18 Allsvenskan	18	1	2	3	10	—	—	—	—	—
2013–14	Rögle BK J20	J20 SuperElit	2	0	0	0	0	—	—	—	—	—
2014–15	Rögle BK J18	J18 Elit	20	6	12	18	53	—	—	—	—	—
2014–15	Rögle BK J18	J18 Allsvenskan	18	1	6	7	16	—	—	—	—	—
2014–15	Rögle BK J20	J20 SuperElit	4	0	0	0	2	4	0	0	0	0
2015–16	Rögle BK J20	J20 SuperElit	42	3	12	15	42	7	0	0	0	6
2015–16	Rögle BK	SHL	1	0	0	0	0	—	—	—	—	—
2016–17	Rögle BK J20	J20 SuperElit	41	15	14	29	93	3	0	3	3	4
2016–17	Rögle BK	SHL	12	0	0	0	0	—	—	—	—	—
2016–17	Helsingborgs HC	Hockeyettan	1	0	0	0	0	—	—	—	—	—
2017–18	Rungsted Seier Capital	Metal Ligaen	50	11	17	28	40	14	3	6	9	18
2018–19	Rungsted Seier Capital	Metal Ligaen	38	7	20	27	69	14	2	9	11	12
2019–20	Kristianstads IK	HockeyAllsvenskan	49	3	10	13	28	—	—	—	—	—
2020–21	Rungsted Seier Capital	Metal Ligaen	46	9	33	42	58	15	1	7	8	10
2021–22	Rungsted Seier Capital	Metal Ligaen	44	13	33	46	28	17	2	11	13	10
2022–23	HC Pustertal	ICEHL	8	1	0	1	11	—	—	—	—	—
2022–23	Rungsted Seier Capital	Metal Ligaen	35	6	13	19	38	7	1	3	4	10
2023–24	Rungsted Seier Capital	Metal Ligaen	43	16	27	43	52	4	0	2	2	6
2024–25	Rungsted Seier Capital	Metal Ligaen	32	13	18	31	51	12	3	7	10	4
2025–26	Rungsted Seier Capital	Metal Ligaen	44	12	28	40	32	11	5	6	11	16
Metal Ligaen totals			332	87	189	276	368	94	17	51	68	86

=== International ===
Year	Team	Event	GP	G	A	Pts	PIM
2014	Denmark U18	WJC-18	6	0	1	1	0
2015	Denmark U18	WJC-18 (D1)	5	0	2	2	16
2016	Denmark U20	WJC-20	5	0	0	0	0
2017	Denmark U20	WJC-20	5	0	1	1	14
2022	Denmark	WC	5	0	0	0	2
2023	Denmark	WC	3	0	0	0	0
2026	Denmark	WC	1	0	0	0	0
Junior totals			21	0	4	4	30
Senior totals			9	0	0	0	2
