= Ernest Bokroš =

Slovak ice hockey coach

- Born: 25 August 1959 (age 67) Karviná, Czechoslovakia
- Height: 6 ft 2 in (188 cm)
- Weight: 192 lb (87 kg; 13 st 10 lb)
- Position: Defence
- Shot: Left
- Played for: HC Dukla Trenčín
- NHL draft: Undrafted
- Playing career: 1978–1992

Ernest Bokroš (born 25 August 1959) is a Slovak ice hockey coach. He was the head coach of the Slovakia men's national junior ice hockey team at the 2015 World Junior Ice Hockey Championships.
