= Dmitry Buinitsky =

Belarusian ice hockey player (born 1997)

- Born: March 1, 1997 (age 29) Mogilev, Byelorussian SSR, Soviet Union
- Height: 6 ft 1 in (185 cm)
- Weight: 187 lb (85 kg; 13 st 5 lb)
- Position: Forward
- Shot: Left
- Played for: Dinamo Minsk; Metallurg Magnitogorsk
- National team: Belarus
- NHL draft: Undrafted
- Playing career: 2015–2022

Dmitry Buinitsky (Belarusian: Дзмітрый Буйніцкі; born March 1, 1997) is a Belarusian former professional ice hockey forward. He most recently played with HC Dinamo Minsk of the Kontinental Hockey League (KHL).

== Playing career ==
On February 27, 2015, Buinitsky made his Kontinental Hockey League debut playing with HC Dinamo Minsk during the 2014–15 KHL season.

In order to continue his development, Buinitsky played two seasons of junior in North America with the Madison Capitols of the United States Hockey League (USHL) and the Quebec Remparts of the Quebec Major Junior Hockey League (QMJHL), before returning undrafted to resume his professional career with Dinamo Minsk in the 2017–18 season.

Buinitsky played two seasons with Minsk, scoring 10 goals in 36 games in the 2018–19 season, before leaving as a free agent to sign a three-year contract with Russian club, Metallurg Magnitogorsk, on May 8, 2019.

On 11 April 2024, Buinitsky announced his retirement from professional hockey at the age of 27.
