= Niklas Andersen (ice hockey) =

Danish ice hockey player

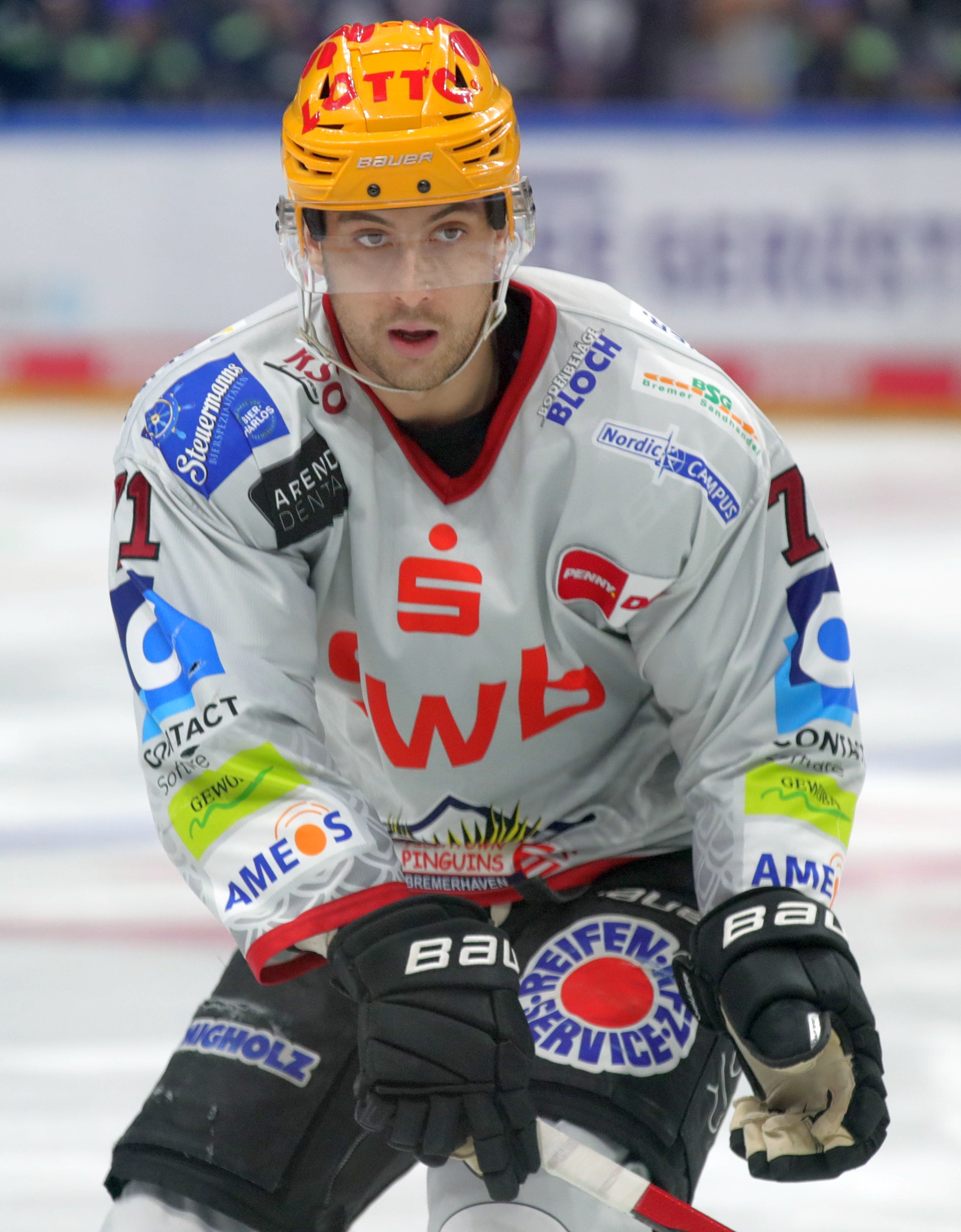
- Born: 20 November 1997 (age 28) Esbjerg, Denmark
- Height: 1.80 m (5 ft 11 in)
- Weight: 86 kg (190 lb; 13 st 8 lb)
- Position: Centre/Right wing
- Shoots: Left
- DEL team Former teams: Augsburger Panther; Esbjerg Energy; Fischtown Pinguins
- National team: Denmark
- NHL draft: Undrafted
- Playing career: 2014–present

Niklas Andersen (born 20 November 1997) is a Danish ice hockey player for Augsburger Panther in the Deutsche Eishockey Liga (DEL) and the Danish national team.

He represented Denmark at the 2021 IIHF World Championship.
