= Alexander True =

Danish ice hockey player (born 1997)

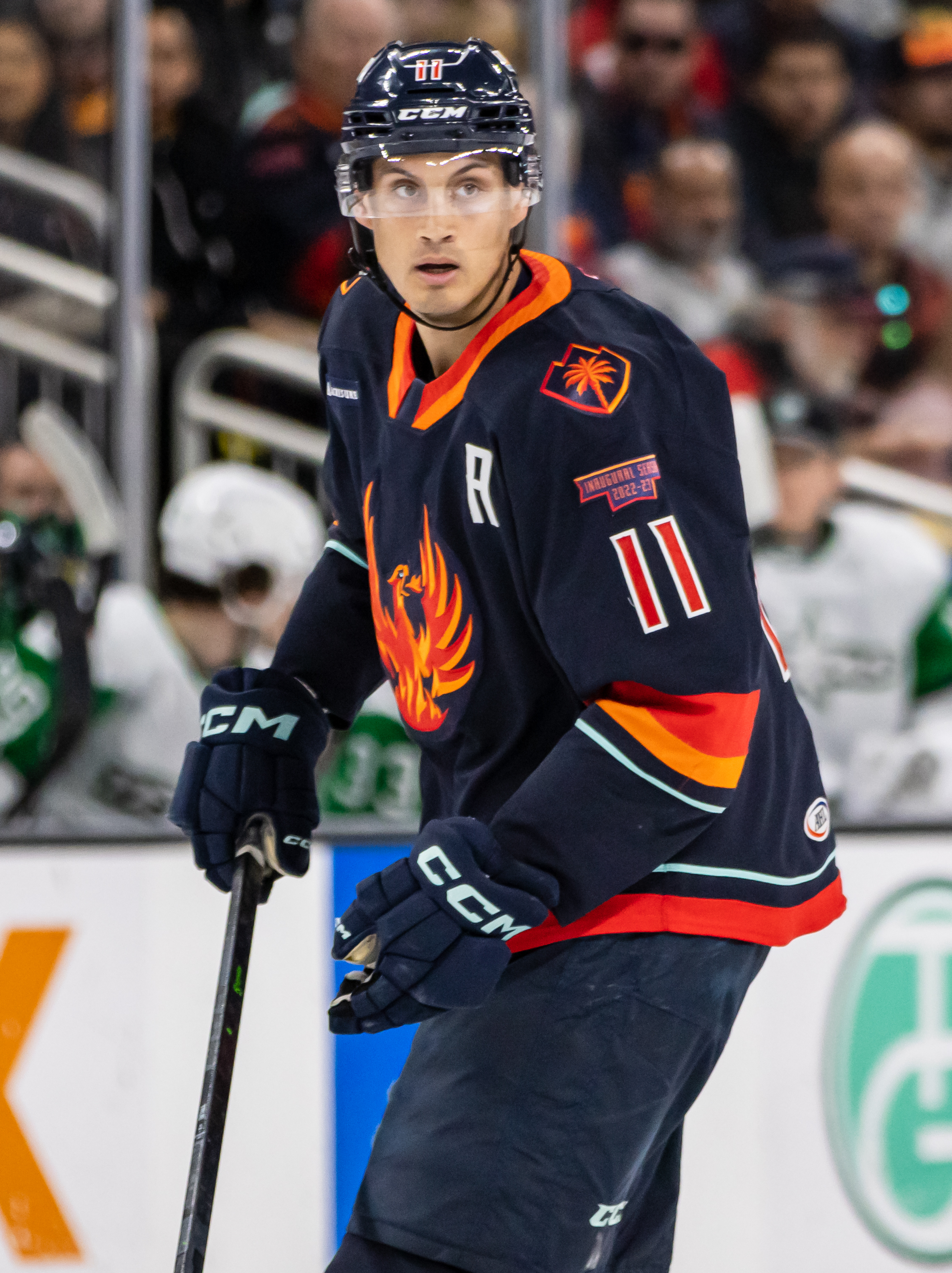
- True with the Coachella Valley Firebirds in 2023
- Born: 17 July 1997 (age 29) Copenhagen, Denmark
- Height: 6 ft 5 in (196 cm)
- Weight: 213 lb (97 kg; 15 st 3 lb)
- Position: Centre
- Shoots: Left
- Liiga team Former teams: JYP Jyväskylä; Rungsted IK; San Jose Sharks; Seattle Kraken; MoDo Hockey
- National team: Denmark
- NHL draft: Undrafted
- Playing career: 2017–present

Alexander True (born 17 July 1997) is a Danish professional ice hockey player who is a centre for JYP Jyväskylä of the Liiga.

Born and raised in Denmark, True played for the Rungsted Ishockey Klub and Gladsaxe SF in the Danish Division 1 before moving to North America. He played three seasons of major junior hockey with the Seattle Thunderbirds in the Western Hockey League before turning professional with the San Jose Barracuda in the American Hockey League (AHL).

== Playing career ==
=== Amateur ===
Following the 2013–14 season, True was drafted in the first round, 48th overall, by the Seattle Thunderbirds in the Western Hockey League (WHL). He joined the Thunderbirds for the 2014–15 season and made his debut with the team on 19 September 2014. In his debut, he scored his first WHL goal to lead the Thunderbirds to a 4–1 win over the Portland Winterhawks. By December, True had accumulated five goals and five assists for 10 points through 30 regular-season games. His playing ability earned him a spot on Team Denmark for the 2014 World Junior A Challenge and the 2015 World Junior Ice Hockey Championships. While True would miss significant time to recover from an arm injury, he finished his rookie season with six goals and six assists through 38 regular season games and two goals in six playoff games.

After remaining undrafted in the 2015 NHL entry draft, True returned to the Thunderbirds for their training camp ahead of the 2015–16 season. He immediately improved on his rookie seasons total by amassing 10 goals and eight assists for 18 points through his first 27 games. On 8 December, True was named to Team Denmark's preliminary roster for the 2016 World Junior Ice Hockey Championships. He finished the season with 14 goals to help the Thunderbirds clinch a 45–23–4 record, the second most wins in franchise history. During the 2016 WHL Championship, True tallied two goals to stave off elimination in Game 4. He scored again the following game but the Thunderbirds fell 8–4 to the Brandon Wheat Kings. True finished the playoffs with six goals and four assists through all 18 games.

True returned to the Thunderbirds for the 2016–17 season, his third and final season in the WHL. With the short-term loss of Mathew Barzal to the New York Islanders, True stepped up into a first line role for the Thunderbirds throughout the season. By the start of November, True had collected five goals through the first 12 games of the season. He continued to improve throughout the month, including scoring a hat-trick to lead the Thunderbirds to a 4–3 win over the Lethbridge Hurricanes. His efforts were recognized by the league with their WHL Player of the Week honour for the week ending on 20 November. Throughout the week, True had registered five goals and two assists over three games to help the Thunderbirds maintain a 2–0–1 record. In December, True was again named to Team Denmark ahead of the 2017 World Junior Ice Hockey Championships. At the time of the selection, he had amassed 10 goals and 19 points over the first 30 games of the season. True finished the regular season with 22 goals as he helped the Thunderbirds clinch home-ice advantage in the first round of the 2017 WHL playoffs. True scored two goals in Game 4 to sweep the Tri-City Americans in their best-of-seven first round playoff series. He scored another series-clinching goal in the second round against the Everett Silvertips to help the Thunderbirds reach the Western Conference final. True later scored the game-winning goal in overtime in Game 6 of the WHL Championship series to lead the Thunderbirds to their first championship title in franchise history.

=== Professional ===
==== San Jose Sharks organization ====
Following the 2016–17 season, True participated in the San Jose Sharks NHL training camp ahead of the 2017–18 season. After impressing at the training camp, he signed a professional contract with their American Hockey League (AHL) affiliate, the San Jose Barracuda, on 13 July. True made his professional debut and scored his first professional goal on 14 October against the San Antonio Rampage. In his first month with the Barracuda, True consistently centred their second line and spent time on their power play and penalty-killing units. Over his first 26 games with the Barracuda, True tallied five goals and four assists for nine points while seeing consistent playing time on the team's penalty kill unit. On 14 April 2018, True scored the game-winning goal over the Stockton Heat to lead the Barracusa to its third consecutive playoff appearance. He finished his rookie regular season ranked second on the Barracuda with 15 goals and tied for third with 28 points. In the first round of the 2018 Calder Cup playoffs, True scored his first professional playoff goal in his playoff debut during Game 1 against the top-ranked Tucson Roadrunners. After the Barracuda fell to the Roadrunners, True signed an entry-level contract with the San Jose Sharks on 18 July.

Upon signing the contract, True again participated in the San Jose Sharks training camp before returning to the Barracuda for the 2018–19 season. In his sophomore season with the Barracuda, True set both personal and franchise records while leading the team to another playoff berth. On 27 March 2019, True scored his team-leading 23rd goal of the season to move into third on the franchise's goals scored in a season list. He finished the season with a franchise record six game-winning goals and also set a new personal best while leading the team with 24 goals and 31 assists for 55 points. In the 2019 Calder Cup playoffs, True scored 50 seconds into Game 4 to give the Barracuda the lead but the team was swept San Diego Gulls. In recognition of his efforts, True received the team's most valuable player (MVP) award at the end of the season.

While True spent the majority of the shortened 2019–20 season in the AHL, he made his NHL debut in February and played 12 games with the Sharks. After being re-assigned to the Barracuda to start the 2019–20 season, True continued to build on his sophomore success. By February 2020, True ranked third on the team with 11 goals and 14 assists for 25 points. He was recalled to the NHL level on 3 February and made his NHL debut the following night in a 3–1 win over the Calgary Flames. In his debut, True recorded one shot on net and four hits in 12:52 minutes of ice time. He recorded his first career NHL point, an assist on Stefan Noesen's second period goal, on 6 February during a 6–3 win over the Edmonton Oilers. He finished his 12 game NHL stint with four assists and two penalty minutes. After being returned to the AHL, True helped the Barracuda finish the season with a 21–27–5–2 record when the league cancelled the remainder of the 2019–20 season due to the COVID-19 pandemic.

While the league was paused, True returned to Denmark and played with the Rungsted IK until the season started again. Shortly after the AHL started their shortened 2020–21 season, True was named an alternate captain for the Barracuda. In his first year as an alternate captain, True finished tied for third on the team with nine goals and 11 assists for 20 points. He also received the team's MVP award for the second time, becoming the first player in franchise history to earn this honor twice. True also appeared in seven games for the Sharks during the season, where he tallied one point and six penalty minutes. At the conclusion of the season, True was left unprotected by the Sharks in the 2021 NHL expansion draft.

==== Seattle Kraken organization ====
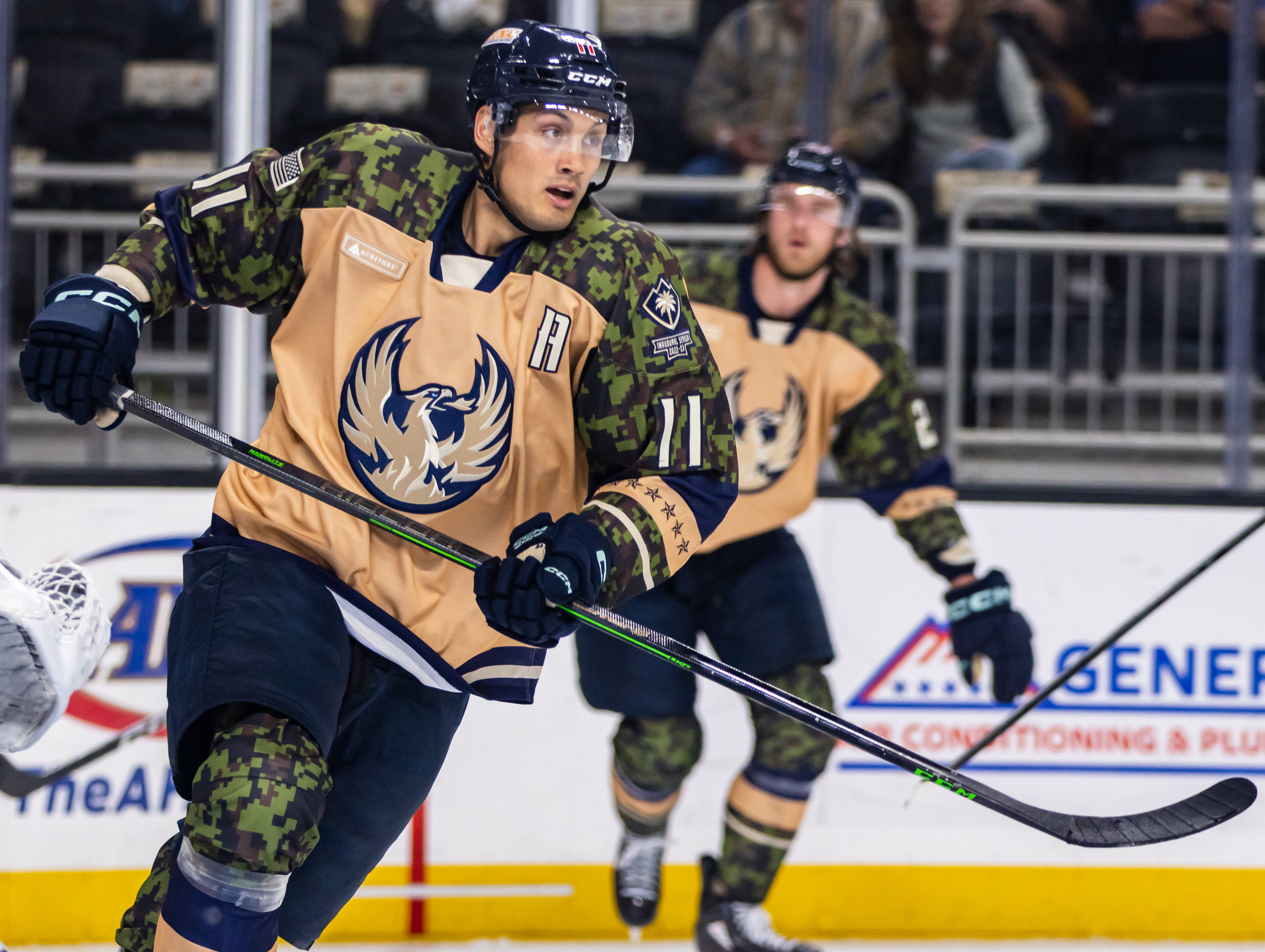
True playing with the Coachella Valley Firebirds in 2023.

After being left unprotected by the Sharks, True was drafted by the Seattle Kraken in the 2021 NHL Expansion Draft. Following the draft, True signed a one-year, two-way contract with the Kraken worth an average annual value of $750,000. It was later revealed that he would wear jersey number 11 when playing with the Kraken. After participating in the preseason with the Kraken, True was reassigned to their AHL affiliate, the Charlotte Checkers, to start the 2021–22 season. He was recalled for a short stint in early October as a potential replacement for Jared McCann and Joonas Donskoi in case they were unable to clear the league's COVID-19 protocols. After tallying 18 points in 22 games with the Checkers, True was recalled to the NHL level on 11 December as a potential temporary replacement for Yanni Gourde or Riley Sheahan. He made his regular season debut for the Kraken the following night against the Columbus Blue Jackets. True appeared in eight games for the Kraken during the callup before being reassigned to the AHL on 21 January 2022. Although he had missed nearly a month, True returned to the Checkers as their fourth most prolific scorer. By the start of March, True improved to 11 goals and 18 assists for 29 points through 39 games. In the final seven games of the season, True scored five goals to finish with the team lead in scoring with 18 goals and 24 assists. His efforts helped the Checkers become the first team in the Eastern Conference to clinch a playoff spot. As a result of their first place spot, the Checkers earned a bye which advanced them to the second round of a 2022 Calder Cup playoffs. In Game 1 of their second round series against the Bridgeport Islanders, True scored twice to give the Checkers the series lead. He finished the series with two goals and two assists as the Checkers advanced to the third round. In the Eastern Conference Division Finals, True and the Checkers were swept in three games by the Springfield Thunderbirds. He finished the postseason notching three goals and four assists in seven games.

On 12 July 2022, True signed a two-way, one-year contract extension with the Kraken worth an average annual value of $750,000. He then spent the entire 2022-23 season with the team's new AHL affiliate, the Coachella Valley Firebirds.

==== Florida Panthers organization ====
After two seasons within the Kraken organization, True left as a free agent and was signed to a one-year, two-way contract with the Florida Panthers on 1 July 2023. After participating in nearly all of the Panther's preseason games, True was placed on waivers with the intent to be re-assigned to their AHL affiliate to start the 2023–24 season. True remained with the Charlotte Checkers for the duration of the season, posting just 19 points through 55 regular season games.

==== MoDo Hockey ====
As a pending free agent from the Panthers, True opted to return to Europe in signing a two-year contract with Swedish top tier club, MoDo Hockey of the Swedish Hockey League (SHL), on 4 May 2024. In the 2024–25 season, True was utilised in a top-nine forward role, contributing with 7 goals and 17 points. Appearing in every game in the season, True was unable to help MoDo avoid relegation to the Allsvenskan.

==== JYP Jyväskylä ====
With MoDo returning to the second tier, True opted to leave the club and was signed to a one-year contract with Finnish club, JYP Jyväskylä of the Liiga, on 28 July 2025.

== Personal life ==
True was born on July 17, 1997, in Copenhagen, Denmark, to father Søren True. While his dad is Danish, his mom is Filipino. He was born into an athletic family as his father, uncles, cousins, and brother all play ice hockey. His father was selected by the New York Rangers in the 12th round of the 1986 NHL entry draft, although he never appeared in a game. Both of True's uncles, Mikkel and Mads, played for the Odense Bulldogs in the Metal Ligaen. True's younger brother Oliver also chose to remain in Denmark and currently plays for the Herlev Eagles. Like his father, True's cousin Nikolaj Ehlers was drafted into the NHL and currently plays left wing for the Carolina Hurricanes.

== Career statistics ==
=== Regular season and playoffs ===
			Regular season					Playoffs
Season	Team	League	GP	G	A	Pts	PIM	GP	G	A	Pts	PIM
2012–13	Rungsted IK	DEN.20	12	3	4	7	0	2	2	2	4	0
2013–14	Gladsaxe SF	DEN.20	—	—	—	—	—	3	2	0	2	2
2013–14	Rungsted IK	DEN.2	25	10	12	22	14	—	—	—	—	—
2013–14	Rungsted IK	DEN	11	0	0	0	0	—	—	—	—	—
2014–15	Seattle Thunderbirds	WHL	38	6	6	12	14	6	2	0	2	0
2015–16	Seattle Thunderbirds	WHL	65	14	18	32	26	18	6	4	10	6
2016–17	Seattle Thunderbirds	WHL	66	25	15	40	38	20	12	10	22	16
2017–18	San Jose Barracuda	AHL	68	15	13	28	33	4	1	0	1	4
2018–19	San Jose Barracuda	AHL	68	24	31	55	45	4	1	1	2	0
2019–20	San Jose Barracuda	AHL	40	11	14	25	14	—	—	—	—	—
2019–20	San Jose Sharks	NHL	12	0	4	4	2	—	—	—	—	—
2020–21	Rungsted IK	DEN	1	0	0	0	0	—	—	—	—	—
2020–21	San Jose Sharks	NHL	7	0	1	1	6	—	—	—	—	—
2020–21	San Jose Barracuda	AHL	27	9	11	20	14	—	—	—	—	—
2021–22	Charlotte Checkers	AHL	60	18	24	42	45	7	3	4	7	14
2021–22	Seattle Kraken	NHL	8	0	0	0	2	—	—	—	—	—
2022–23	Coachella Valley Firebirds	AHL	72	11	21	32	48	26	7	12	19	6
2023–24	Charlotte Checkers	AHL	55	4	15	19	36	3	0	1	1	2
2024–25	MoDo Hockey	SHL	52	7	10	17	16	—	—	—	—	—
2025–26	JYP Jyväskylä	Liiga	53	13	22	35	50	—	—	—	—	—
NHL totals			27	0	5	5	10	—	—	—	—	—
SHL totals			52	7	10	17	16	—	—	—	—	—

=== International ===
Year	Team	Event	Result	GP	G	A	Pts	PIM
2014	Denmark	U18	10th	6	1	0	1	2
2015	Denmark	WJC	8th	5	0	0	0	2
2015	Denmark	U18-D1A	11th	5	2	3	5	4
2016	Denmark	WJC	8th	5	1	1	2	6
2017	Denmark	WJC	5th	5	1	2	3	0
2021	Denmark	WC	12th	7	1	1	2	0
2022	Denmark	OGQ	Q	3	0	0	0	0
2024	Denmark	WC	13th	7	1	0	1	2
2024	Denmark	OGQ	Q	3	0	1	1	0
2025	Denmark	WC	4th	10	2	2	4	8
2026	Denmark	OG	9th	4	1	1	2	0
2026	Denmark	WC	12th	7	0	1	1	2
Junior totals				26	5	6	11	14
Senior totals				41	5	6	11	12
