= Christian Mieritz =

Danish ice hockey player

- Born: 30 September 1997 (age 28) Rødovre, Denmark
- Height: 184 cm (6 ft 0 in)
- Weight: 90 kg (198 lb; 14 st 2 lb)
- Position: Defenceman
- Shoots: Left
- ML team Former teams: Frederikshavn White Hawks; Rødovre Mighty Bulls; Leksands IF; Herning Blue Fox
- Playing career: 2014–present

Christian Mieritz (born 30 September 1997) is a Danish ice hockey defenceman currently playing for Frederikshavn White Hawks of the Danish Metal Ligaen.
