= Nicolai Weichel =

Danish ice hockey player

- Born: November 6, 1997 (age 27); Hørsholm, Denmark
- Height: 6 ft 1 in (185 cm)
- Weight: 198 lb (90 kg; 14 st 2 lb)
- Position: Defence
- Shoots: Left
- ML team: Nordsjælland Cobras
- National team: Denmark
- Playing career: 2012–present

Nicolai Weichel (born November 6, 1997) is a Danish ice hockey player for Nordsjælland Cobras and the Danish national team.

He participated at the 2017 IIHF World Championship.
