= Mathias From =

Danish ice hockey player (born 1997)

- Born: 16 December 1997 (age 28) Frederikshavn, Denmark
- Height: 6 ft 1 in (185 cm)
- Weight: 187 lb (85 kg; 13 st 5 lb)
- Position: Forward
- Shoots: Right
- ICEHL team Former teams: EC KAC; Rögle BK; Düsseldorfer EG; Herning Blue Fox
- National team: Denmark
- NHL draft: 143rd overall, 2016; Chicago Blackhawks
- Playing career: 2013–present

Mathias From Frederikshavn (born 16 December 1997) is a Danish professional ice hockey player who is a forward for EC KAC of the ICE Hockey League (ICEHL). From was selected by the Chicago Blackhawks in the fifth round, 143rd overall, in the 2016 NHL entry draft.

== Playing career ==
From originally played as a youth in his native Denmark with Frederikshavn IK of the Danish Division 1 before joining Swedish club, Rögle BK, to continue his development as a junior.

He played three seasons in the Swedish Hockey League for Rögle BK before leaving the club and playing in the Swedish second tier league, the HockeyAllsvenskan with AIK IF and Modo Hockey.

On 9 April 2020, From opted to continue his European career by leaving Sweden and agreeing to a one-year contract with German club, Düsseldorfer EG of the DEL.

Following the conclusion of his contract in Germany, From opted to return to the Swedish Allsvenskan, agreeing to a two-year contract with Västerås IK on 1 June 2021.

== Career statistics ==
=== Regular season and playoffs ===
			Regular season					Playoffs
Season	Team	League	GP	G	A	Pts	PIM	GP	G	A	Pts	PIM
2012–13	Frederikshavn IK	DEN.2	1	0	2	2	0	—	—	—	—	—
2013–14	Frederikshavn IK	DEN.2	15	5	6	11	4	—	—	—	—	—
2014–15	Rögle BK	J20	—	—	—	—	—	4	0	0	0	2
2015–16	Rögle BK	J20	36	6	15	21	42	7	2	2	4	0
2015–16	Rögle BK	SHL	16	2	2	4	0	—	—	—	—	—
2016–17	Rögle BK	J20	13	9	9	18	8	3	2	0	2	0
2016–17	Rögle BK	SHL	33	3	1	4	12	—	—	—	—	—
2017–18	Rögle BK	SHL	21	2	3	5	6	—	—	—	—	—
2017–18	Södertälje SK	Allsv	16	1	3	4	4	—	—	—	—	—
2017–18	AIK	Allsv	7	1	0	1	6	5	2	3	5	4
2018–19	AIK	Allsv	45	8	8	16	16	7	1	1	2	0
2019–20	Modo Hockey	Allsv	49	12	13	25	46	2	0	0	0	2
2020–21	Düsseldorfer EG	DEL	36	5	12	17	0	—	—	—	—	—
2021–22	Västerås IK	Allsv	43	11	10	21	32	4	1	0	1	0
2022–23	Västerås IK	Allsv	3	0	0	0	2	—	—	—	—	—
2022–23	Herning Blue Fox	DEN	35	16	20	36	14	17	4	14	18	6
2023–24	Herning Blue Fox	DEN	45	28	34	62	24	12	15	9	24	14
SHL totals			70	7	6	13	18	—	—	—	—	—

=== International ===
Year	Team	Event	Result	GP	G	A	Pts	PIM
2015	Denmark	U18-D1	11th	5	4	2	6	0
2016	Denmark	WJC	8th	4	1	1	2	4
2017	Denmark	WJC	5th	3	2	1	3	0
2019	Denmark	WC	11th	4	0	0	0	0
2021	Denmark	WC	12th	7	1	1	2	0
2024	Denmark	WC	13th	7	1	0	1	0
2025	Denmark	WC	4th	10	0	0	0	0
2026	Denmark	WC	12th	7	0	0	0	0
Junior totals				12	7	4	11	4
Senior totals				35	2	1	3	0
