= Hunter Jones (ice hockey) =

Canadian ice hockey player (born 2000)

- Born: September 21, 2000 (age 26) Brantford, Ontario
- Height: 6 ft 4 in (193 cm)
- Weight: 204 lb (93 kg; 14 st 8 lb)
- Position: Goaltender
- Catches: Left
- AHL team Former teams: Laval Rocket; Iowa Wild
- NHL draft: 59th overall, 2019; Minnesota Wild
- Playing career: 2021–present

Hunter Jones (born September 21, 2000) is a Canadian professional ice hockey player who is a goaltender for Laval Rocket of the American Hockey League (AHL). He was selected in the second round, 59th overall, by the Minnesota Wild in the 2019 NHL entry draft.

== Early life ==
Jones was born in Brantford, Ontario, Canada. He began playing hockey at a young age and quickly rose through the ranks of the minor hockey system. His youth team was the Mississauga Reps U15 AAA of the Greater Toronto Hockey League (GTHL).

== Playing career ==
=== Junior ===
Jones began his junior hockey career with the Stouffville Spirit of the Ontario Junior Hockey League (OJHL) in 2016–17. He played in 16 games for the Spirit, posting a 2.74 goals against average and .917 save percentage.

After one season with the Spirit, Jones was drafted by the Peterborough Petes of the Ontario Hockey League (OHL). He joined the Petes in 2017–18 and appeared in 15 games, posting a 5.14 goals against average and .866 save percentage.

While facing struggles in his first season with the Petes, Jones rebounded in 2018–19. In 57 games, he posted a 3.31 goals against average and .902 save percentage. He was named the Petes' most improved player and was selected to play in the 2019 CHL/NHL Top Prospects Game.

In his final major junior season with the Petes in 2019–20, Jones was named OHL's Goaltender of the Month in October 2019, after recording an 8-1-0-0 record with a 2.34 goals against average, .923 save percentage and one shutout over nine games.

=== Professional ===
Jones was drafted by the Minnesota Wild in the second round (59th overall) of the 2019 NHL entry draft. He signed a three-year, entry-level contract with the Wild on March 26, 2020.

Jones made his American Hockey League (AHL) debut with the Iowa Wild in the 2020–21 season, playing 19 games, and posting a 3.50 goals against average and .886 save percentage.

During the Stanley Cup playoffs of the 2022–23 season, Wild general manager Bill Guerin announced that Jones was recalled to serve as Minnesota's third goalie on April 17, 2023.

On July 1, 2024, Jones signed a one-year AHL contract with the Laval Rocket, affiliate of the Montreal Canadiens. Prior to the beginning of the 2024–25 season, Jones was reassigned to the Trois-Rivières Lions, the Canadiens' ECHL affiliate, on October 7. Thereafter, Jones helped guide the Lions to the franchise's first Kelly Cup championship.

Entering the ensuing offseason as an unrestricted free agent, Jones agreed to a one-year deal to remain with the Rocket organization on July 5, 2025. He once again rejoined Trois-Rivières that October ahead of the 2025–26 season.

== International play ==
Medal record

Representing Canada

World Junior A Challenge
Silver medal – second place	2016 Canada	

World U-17 Hockey Challenge
Silver medal – second place	2016 Canada	

Internationally, Jones firstly represented Hockey Canada as part of team Canada Black at the 2016 World U-17 Hockey Challenge where he earned a silver medal. Shortly thereafter, he became the first ever 16-year-old goaltender to be named to the annual World Junior A Challenge capturing a silver medal along with team Canada East.

== Career statistics ==
			Regular season									Playoffs
Season	Team	League	GP	W	L	T/OT	MIN	GA	SO	GAA	SV%	GP	W	L	MIN	GA	SO	GAA	SV%
2016–17	Stouffville Spirit	OJHL	16	7	7	0	854	39	1	2.74	.917	3	0	1	97	10	0	6.18	.833
2017–18	Peterborough Petes	OHL	15	3	9	0	875	75	0	5.14	.866	—	—	—	—	—	—	—	—
2018–19	Peterborough Petes	OHL	57	28	24	2	3,156	174	3	3.31	.902	5	1	4	245	19	0	4.66	.862
2019–20	Peterborough Petes	OHL	49	31	14	3	2,833	130	4	2.75	.913	—	—	—	—	—	—	—	—
2020–21	Iowa Wild	AHL	19	9	9	1	1,097	64	2	3.50	.886	—	—	—	—	—	—	—	—
2021–22	Iowa Wild	AHL	9	2	6	1	485	29	0	3.59	.884	—	—	—	—	—	—	—	—
2021–22	Iowa Heartlanders	ECHL	22	5	11	4	1,260	85	0	4.04	.878	—	—	—	—	—	—	—	—
2022–23	Iowa Wild	AHL	1	0	0	1	61	2	0	1.95	.929	—	—	—	—	—	—	—	—
2022–23	Iowa Heartlanders	ECHL	38	11	17	9	2,227	114	1	3.07	.905	—	—	—	—	—	—	—	—
2023–24	Iowa Wild	AHL	1	0	1	0	60	6	0	6.00	.889	—	—	—	—	—	—	—	—
2023–24	Iowa Heartlanders	ECHL	18	5	9	2	1,014	61	0	3.61	.890	—	—	—	—	—	—	—	—
2024–25	Trois-Rivières Lions	ECHL	28	15	6	6	1,629	78	0	2.87	.905	2	1	0	79	1	1	0.76	.970
2025–26	Trois-Rivières Lions	ECHL	30	17	10	1	1,675	66	4	2.36	.917	—	—	—	—	—	—	—	—
2025–26	Laval Rocket	AHL	3	0	3	0	173	12	0	4.16	.844	—	—	—	—	—	—	—	—
AHL totals			33	11	19	3	1,876	113	2	3.61	.884	—	—	—	—	—	—	—	—

=== International ===
Year	Team	Event	Result	GP	W	L	OT	MIN	GA	SO	GAA	SV%
2016	Canada Black	U17	2nd place, silver medalist(s)	1	1	0	0	60	4	0	4.00	.852
2016	Canada East	WJAC	2nd place, silver medalist(s)	—	—	—	—	—	—	—	—	—
Junior totals				1	1	0	0	60	4	0	4.00	.852

== Awards and honours ==
Award	Year	Ref
OHA
Top Prospect Award	2017	
OJHL
Second All-Prospect Team	2017	
CHL
CHL Canada/Russia Series	2018, 2019	
CHL/NHL Top Prospects Game	2019	
ECHL
Kelly Cup champion	2025	
