= Damien Giroux =

Canadian ice hockey player

- Born: March 3, 2000 (age 26) Sudbury, Ontario, Canada
- Height: 5 ft 10 in (178 cm)
- Weight: 179 lb (81 kg; 12 st 11 lb)
- Position: Center
- Shoots: Left
- SVK team Former teams: HK Spišská Nová Ves; Minnesota Wild
- NHL draft: 155th overall, 2018; Minnesota Wild
- Playing career: 2021–present

Damien Giroux (born March 3, 2000) is a Canadian professional ice hockey forward for the HK Spišská Nová Ves of the Slovak Extraliga. He was selected 155th overall by the Minnesota Wild in the 2018 NHL entry draft.

== Playing career ==
Giroux played junior hockey with the Sudbury Wolves Minor Midget AAA in the GNML before a brief stint with the Rayside-Balfour Canadians in the Northern Ontario Junior Hockey League (NOJHL). Having been selected in the OHL Priority Selection, 44th overall in 2016, by the Saginaw Spirit, Giroux was promptly signed to begin his major junior career in the Ontario Hockey League (OHL) in the 2016–17 season.

Giroux was soon elevated to a leadership role, elevated to an alternate captain in just his second season with the Spirit in 2017–18, in producing 43 points in 68 regular season games, Giroux was selected in the fifth-round, 155th overall, by the Minnesota Wild in the 2018 NHL entry draft.

He would play four seasons in total with the Saginaw Spirit (OHL) from 2016 to 2020, registering 101 goals and 93 assists in 249 games and servings as team captain in his final two campaigns with the Spirit. He concluded his junior career earning a contract with the Wild, signing a three-year, entry-level contract on March 24, 2020.

In his first full professional year, Giroux was limited by the pandemic shortened 2020–21 season, posting 19 points through just 34 games having been assigned to the Iowa Wild in the AHL. Giroux remained with Iowa for the entirety of the following 2021–22 season, suffering injury in posting just 7 points in 48 games.

In the 2022–23 season, Giroux remained with the Iowa Wild, appearing in a career high 67 games, while contributing with 22 points. On April 13, 2022, Giroux was recalled by Minnesota and made his NHL debut in the Wild's final regular season game, recording an assist, in a 4–3 overtime defeat to the Nashville Predators.

As a pending restricted free agent, Giroux was not tendered a qualifying offer by the Wild and was released as a free agent. Unable to garner an NHL contract, Giroux was signed a one-year contract to continue in the AHL with the Rochester Americans, the primary affiliate to the Buffalo Sabres, on July 11, 2023.

At the conclusion of his contract with the Americans, Giroux left as a free agent and continued in the AHL after signing a one-year deal with the Coachella Valley Firebirds, affiliate to the Seattle Kraken, on August 20, 2024.

== Career statistics ==
			Regular season					Playoffs
Season	Team	League	GP	G	A	Pts	PIM	GP	G	A	Pts	PIM
2015–16	Rayside-Balfour Canadians	NOJHL	2	0	1	1	0	1	1	1	2	0
2016–17	Saginaw Spirit	OHL	53	8	17	25	21	—	—	—	—	—
2017–18	Saginaw Spirit	OHL	68	19	24	43	18	4	0	1	1	4
2018–19	Saginaw Spirit	OHL	67	30	21	51	22	17	9	4	13	10
2019–20	Saginaw Spirit	OHL	61	44	31	75	22	—	—	—	—	—
2020–21	Iowa Wild	AHL	34	7	12	19	27	—	—	—	—	—
2021–22	Iowa Wild	AHL	48	3	4	7	20	—	—	—	—	—
2022–23	Iowa Wild	AHL	67	3	19	22	28	2	1	0	1	2
2022–23	Minnesota Wild	NHL	1	0	1	1	2	—	—	—	—	—
2023–24	Rochester Americans	AHL	30	4	7	11	12	—	—	—	—	—
2023–24	Jacksonville Icemen	ECHL	17	7	8	15	10	6	2	0	2	0
2024–25	Kansas City Mavericks	ECHL	67	26	30	56	32	15	6	4	10	2
NHL totals			1	0	1	1	2	—	—	—	—	—
