= Kyle MacLean =

American ice hockey player (born 1999)

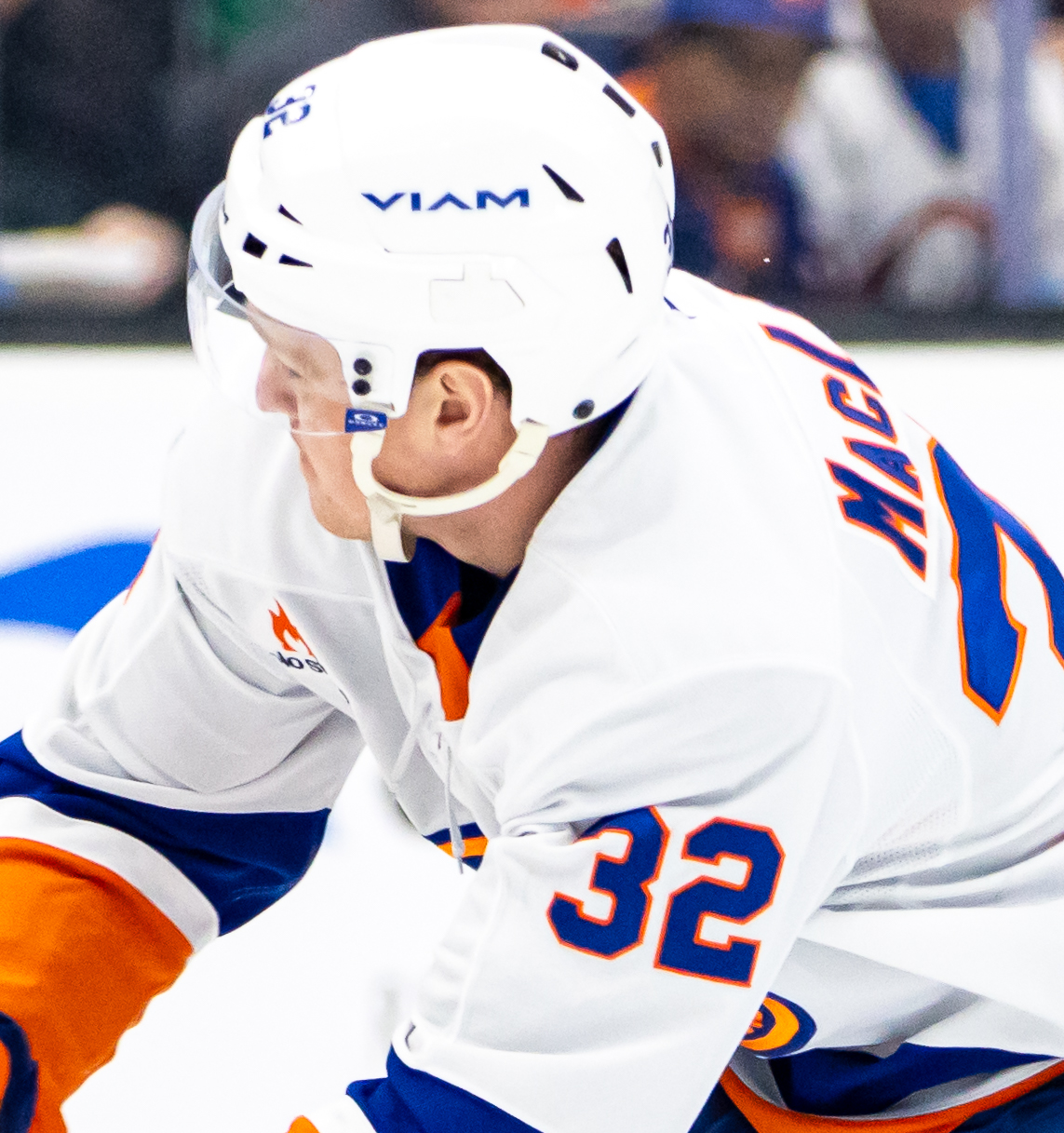
- MacLean with the New York Islanders in 2024
- Born: April 29, 1999 (age 27) Livingston, New Jersey, U.S.
- Height: 6 ft 1 in (185 cm)
- Weight: 190 lb (86 kg; 13 st 8 lb)
- Position: Center
- Shoots: Left
- NHL team: New York Islanders
- NHL draft: Undrafted
- Playing career: 2020–present

Kyle MacLean (born April 29, 1999) is an American professional ice hockey player who is a center for the New York Islanders of the National Hockey League (NHL).

== Playing career ==
In 2015, MacLean was selected with the 78th overall pick in the 2015 OHL Priority Selection by Oshawa Generals of the Ontario Hockey League (OHL). He played for five seasons with the Generals and also served as their captain for two years, before joining the Bridgeport Sound Tigers of the American Hockey League (AHL) for the 2020–21 training camp. On August 3, 2021, he signed a one-year contract extension with Bridgeport.

On May 19, 2023, MacLean signed a one-year, two-way contract with the New York Islanders of the National Hockey League (NHL). In September 2023, he joined New York's training camp roster for the 2023–24 season, but did not make the team and was loaned to Bridgeport for the start of the season. He was recalled to the NHL on January 17, 2024, and made his NHL debut two days later in the Islanders' 4–3 overtime loss to the Chicago Blackhawks. MacLean scored his first NHL goal on February 5, in a 3–2 win over the Toronto Maple Leafs. After conclusion of the 2023–24 season, in which MacLean recorded four goals and five assists for nine points in 32 games with New York, he was re-signed to a three-year contract on June 19, 2024.

== Personal life ==
MacLean is the son of former NHL player John MacLean, who was formerly the assistant coach of the New York Islanders.

== Career statistics ==
			Regular season					Playoffs
Season	Team	League	GP	G	A	Pts	PIM	GP	G	A	Pts	PIM
2015–16	Oshawa Generals	OHL	47	4	5	9	30	5	0	0	0	4
2016–17	Oshawa Generals	OHL	68	6	7	13	47	11	2	0	2	8
2017–18	Oshawa Generals	OHL	44	10	18	28	46	5	3	0	3	0
2018–19	Oshawa Generals	OHL	68	18	42	60	42	15	5	8	13	12
2019–20	Oshawa Generals	OHL	51	13	33	46	64	—	—	—	—	—
2020–21	Bridgeport Sound Tigers	AHL	22	2	6	8	18	—	—	—	—	—
2021–22	Bridgeport Islanders	AHL	68	10	14	24	61	6	1	1	2	7
2022–23	Bridgeport Islanders	AHL	67	11	16	27	81	—	—	—	—	—
2023–24	Bridgeport Islanders	AHL	43	6	16	22	32	—	—	—	—	—
2023–24	New York Islanders	NHL	32	4	5	9	11	5	1	0	1	5
2024–25	New York Islanders	NHL	81	4	7	11	14	—	—	—	—	—
2025–26	New York Islanders	NHL	59	2	5	7	40	—	—	—	—	—
NHL totals			172	10	17	27	65	5	1	0	1	5
