= Tye Felhaber =

Canadian ice hockey player (born 1998)

- Born: August 5, 1998 (age 28) Pembroke, Ontario, Canada
- Height: 5 ft 11 in (180 cm)
- Weight: 187 lb (85 kg; 13 st 5 lb)
- Position: Left wing
- Shoots: Left
- NHL team (P) Cur. team Former teams: San Jose Sharks; San Jose Barracuda (AHL); Colorado Avalanche
- NHL draft: Undrafted
- Playing career: 2018–present

Tye Felhaber (born August 5, 1998) is a Canadian professional ice hockey left wing for the San Jose Barracuda of the American Hockey League (AHL), while under contract to the San Jose Sharks of the National Hockey League (NHL).

== Playing career ==
Felhaber was born and raised in Pembroke, Ontario, where he played minor and junior hockey. During the 2024–25 season, after signing a two year, entry-level contract with the Colorado Avalanche on December 15, 2024, he played in his first NHL game the next day, against the Vancouver Canucks.

After two seasons within the Avalanche organization, Felhaber left as a free agent and was signed to a one-year, two-way contract by the San Jose Sharks on July 1, 2026.

== Career statistics ==
=== Regular season and playoffs ===
			Regular season					Playoffs
Season	Team	League	GP	G	A	Pts	PIM	GP	G	A	Pts	PIM
2013–14	Pembroke Lumber Kings	CCHL	5	1	1	2	0	3	0	0	0	0
2014–15	Saginaw Spirit	OHL	63	20	17	37	19	4	0	1	1	0
2015–16	Saginaw Spirit	OHL	64	18	20	38	16	4	0	0	0	0
2016–17	Saginaw Spirit	OHL	13	4	4	8	4	—	—	—	—	—
2016–17	Ottawa 67's	OHL	35	13	10	23	13	6	2	3	5	0
2017–18	Ottawa 67's	OHL	68	31	39	70	26	5	2	2	4	9
2017–18	Laval Rocket	AHL	4	0	0	0	0	—	—	—	—	—
2018–19	Ottawa 67's	OHL	68	59	50	109	45	18	17	11	28	12
2019–20	Texas Stars	AHL	41	2	6	8	33	—	—	—	—	—
2019–20	Idaho Steelheads	ECHL	6	3	3	6	4	—	—	—	—	—
2020–21	Texas Stars	AHL	31	4	4	8	27	—	—	—	—	—
2021–22	Texas Stars	AHL	14	2	0	2	2	—	—	—	—	—
2021–22	Orlando Solar Bears	ECHL	14	9	5	14	8	—	—	—	—	—
2021–22	Syracuse Crunch	AHL	3	0	0	0	0	—	—	—	—	—
2022–23	Fort Wayne Komets	ECHL	51	14	49	63	43	7	2	4	6	14
2022–23	Milwaukee Admirals	AHL	21	7	6	13	4	—	—	—	—	—
2023–24	Milwaukee Admirals	AHL	50	10	13	23	68	4	0	1	1	0
2024–25	Colorado Eagles	AHL	67	22	22	44	108	9	4	4	8	26
2024–25	Colorado Avalanche	NHL	5	0	0	0	0	—	—	—	—	—
2025–26	Colorado Eagles	AHL	63	15	16	31	36	17	3	4	7	6
NHL totals			5	0	0	0	0	—	—	—	—	—

=== International ===
Year	Team	Event	Result	GP	G	A	Pts	PIM
2014	Canada Red	U17	6th	5	0	1	1	2
Junior totals				5	0	1	1	2

== Awards and honours ==
Award	Year
OHL
Second All-Star Team	2019
