= Alexey Toropchenko =

Russian ice hockey player (born 1999)

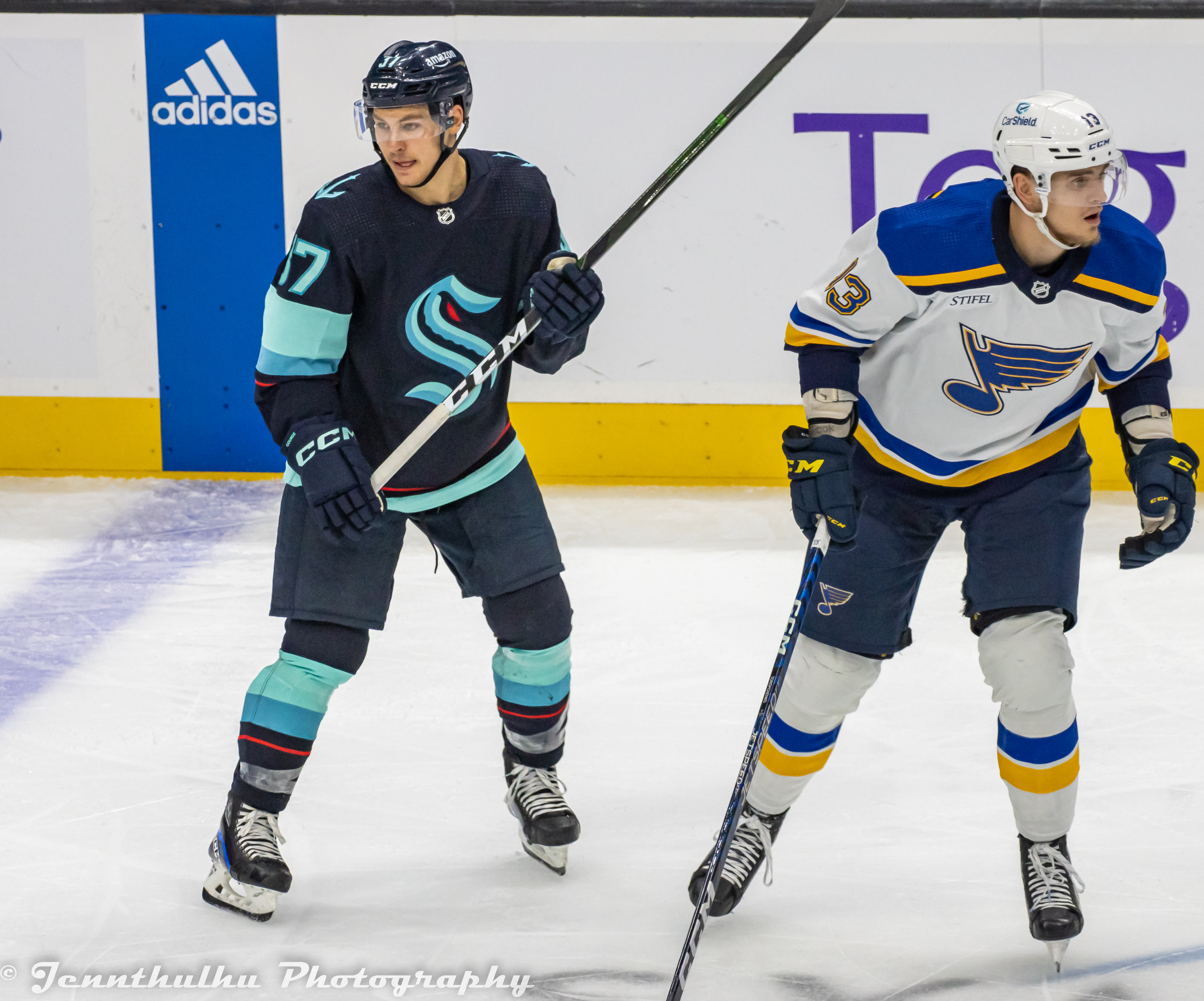
- Toropchenko with the St. Louis Blues in 2022
- Born: 25 June 1999 (age 27) Moscow, Russia
- Height: 6 ft 6 in (198 cm)
- Weight: 222 lb (101 kg; 15 st 12 lb)
- Position: Forward
- Shoots: Left
- NHL team Former teams: St. Louis Blues; Kunlun Red Star
- NHL draft: 113th overall, 2017; St. Louis Blues
- Playing career: 2017–present

Alexey Leonidovich Toropchenko (Russian: Алексей Леонидович Торопченко; born 25 June 1999) is a Russian professional ice hockey player who is a forward for the St. Louis Blues of the National Hockey League (NHL). He was drafted 113th overall by the Blues in the fourth round of the 2017 NHL entry draft.

== Playing career ==
=== Junior ===
Toropchenko was an alternate captain for the HK MVD Balashikha in the Junior Hockey League (MHL) before being drafted fourth overall by the Guelph Storm for the Ontario Hockey League (OHL) in the 2017 CHL Import Draft.

In his OHL debut on 22 September 2017, Toropchenko made his first OHL goal and assist in a 4–3 shootout loss against the Sarnia Sting. Overall, he played 66 games with 17 goals and 22 assists in the 2017–18 OHL season. In his sophomore season, he played 62 games with 17 goals and 26 assists, helping the Storm win their fourth J. Ross Robertson Cup in the 2019 OHL playoffs.

=== Professional ===
After being drafted 113th overall by the St. Louis Blues in the fourth round of the 2017 NHL entry draft, the Blues signed Toropchenko to a three-year entry-level contract on 13 December 2018.

On 13 April 2018, Toropchenko made his professional debut with the Blues' then AHL affiliate, the San Antonio Rampage, in a 4–2 loss against the Texas Stars. On 1 November 2019, he made his first professional goal in a 4–2 win against the Stars, ultimately playing 59 games with five goals and four assists in the 2019–20 AHL season.

On 29 September 2020, the Blues assigned Toropchenko to the HC Kunlun Red Star of the Kontinental Hockey League (KHL) for the 2020–21 KHL season, ultimately playing 45 games with seven goals and four assists. He made his KHL debut on 4 October 2020 in a 6–3 loss against Dynamo Moscow. He scored his first KHL goal on 19 October 2020 in a 3–1 win against Torpedo Nizhny Novgorod. On 25 October 2020 in a game against CSKA Moscow, he scored the fastest goal in Kunlun Red Star history, scoring 34 seconds into the first period.

He returned to the Blues' AHL affiliate, the Springfield Thunderbirds, for the 2021–22 season.

On 14 December 2021, after the Blues suffered a COVID-19 outbreak, Toropchenko made his NHL debut in a 4–1 win against the Dallas Stars.

== International play ==
Toropchenko represented Russia men's national under-18 ice hockey team at the 2016 Ivan Hlinka Memorial Tournament and the 2017 IIHF World U18 Championships, winning a bronze medal in both tournaments.

== Personal life ==
His father, Leonid, was the 260th overall pick for the Pittsburgh Penguins in the 1993 NHL entry draft and played 14 seasons of professional hockey in Russia and North America. He died of a heart attack in May 2017.

== Career statistics ==
=== Regular season and playoffs ===
			Regular season					Playoffs
Season	Team	League	GP	G	A	Pts	PIM	GP	G	A	Pts	PIM
2015–16	HK MVD Balashikha	MHL	21	1	2	3	2	—	—	—	—	—
2016–17	HK MVD Balashikha	MHL	45	19	12	31	50	—	—	—	—	—
2016–17	Dynamo Balashikha	VHL	1	0	0	0	0	—	—	—	—	—
2017–18	Guelph Storm	OHL	66	17	22	29	31	6	1	1	2	4
2018–19	Guelph Storm	OHL	62	17	26	43	33	24	13	6	19	21
2019–20	San Antonio Rampage	AHL	59	5	4	9	21	—	—	—	—	—
2020–21	Kunlun Red Star	KHL	45	7	4	11	39	—	—	—	—	—
2021–22	Springfield Thunderbirds	AHL	42	10	10	20	24	—	—	—	—	—
2021–22	St. Louis Blues	NHL	28	2	0	2	15	12	0	2	2	2
2022–23	St. Louis Blues	NHL	69	10	9	19	12	—	—	—	—	—
2022–23	Springfield Thunderbirds	AHL	5	1	2	3	4	—	—	—	—	—
2023–24	St. Louis Blues	NHL	82	14	7	21	30	—	—	—	—	—
2024–25	St. Louis Blues	NHL	80	4	14	18	25	7	2	2	4	10
2025–26	St. Louis Blues	NHL	65	4	7	11	28	—	—	—	—	—
NHL totals			324	34	37	71	110	19	2	4	6	12

=== International ===
Year	Team	Event	Result	GP	G	A	Pts	PIM
2016	Russia	IH18	3rd place, bronze medalist(s)	5	0	0	0	0
2017	Russia	U18	3rd place, bronze medalist(s)	7	0	2	2	2
Junior totals				12	0	2	2	2
