= Matt Villalta =

Canadian ice hockey player (born 1999)

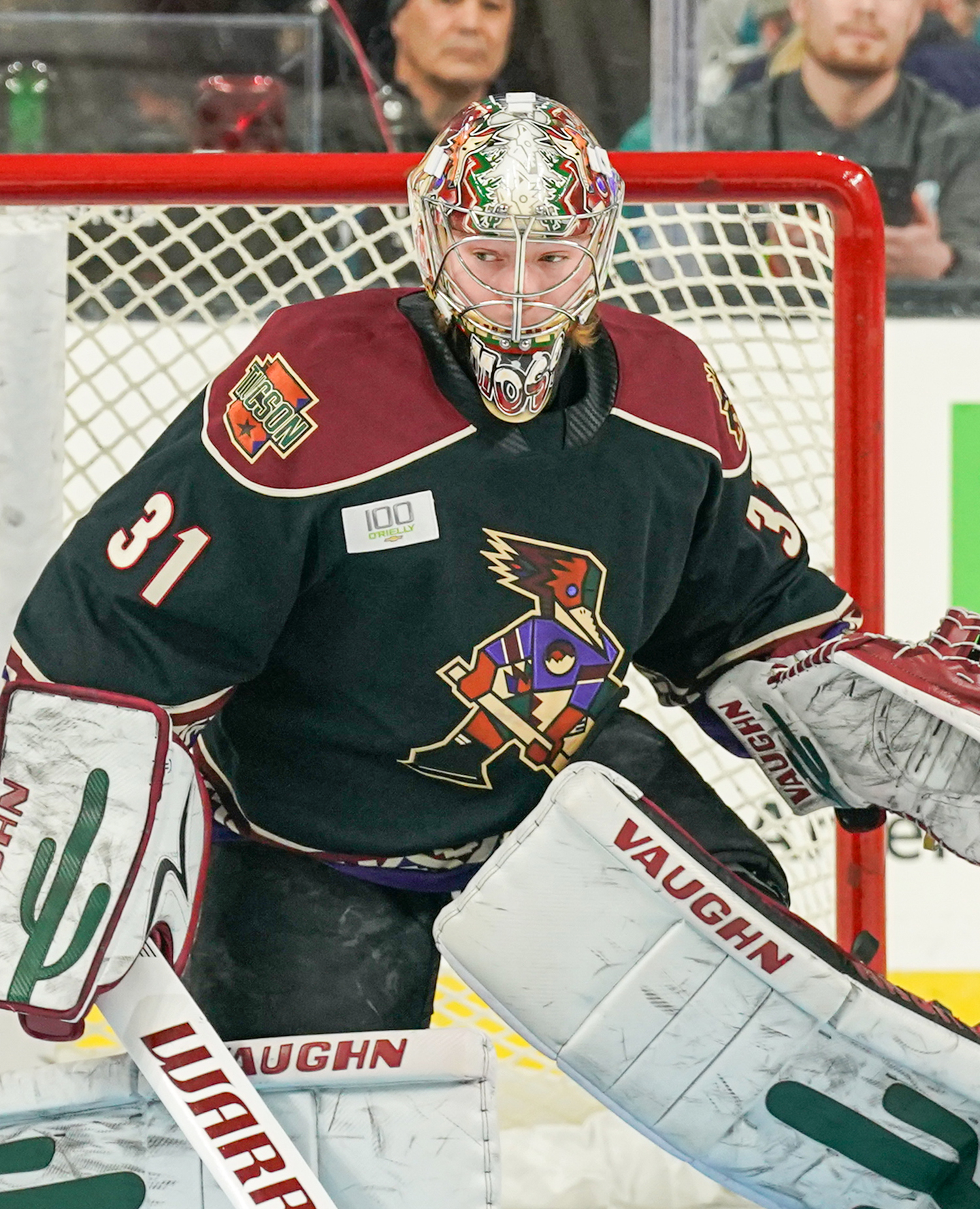
- Villalta with the Tucson Roadrunners in 2024
- Born: June 3, 1999 (age 27) Kingston, Ontario, Canada
- Height: 6 ft 3 in (191 cm)
- Weight: 190 lb (86 kg; 13 st 8 lb)
- Position: Goaltender
- Catches: Left
- NHL team (P) Cur. team Former teams: Buffalo Sabres; Rochester Americans (AHL); Arizona Coyotes; Utah Hockey Club
- NHL draft: 72nd overall, 2017; Los Angeles Kings
- Playing career: 2019–present

Matthew Villalta (born June 3, 1999) is a Canadian professional ice hockey player who is a goaltender for the Rochester Americans of the American Hockey League (AHL) while under contract to the Buffalo Sabres of the National Hockey League (NHL). He was selected by the Los Angeles Kings in the third round (72nd overall) of the 2017 NHL entry draft.

== Playing career ==
Villalta played for the Greater Kingston Jr. Frontenacs U16 team in 2014–15 and for the club's U18 squad in 2015–16. At age 15 in 2015, he was the only person from Greater Kingston to receive an invite to the Ontario Hockey League (OHL) combine. However, he was not selected in the OHL Draft and signed with the junior-B level Westport Rideaus.

Villalta began playing in the OHL for the Sault Ste. Marie Greyhounds starting in 2016, after having impressed at a Greyhounds tryout. He appeared in 33 games with 28 starts in the 2016–17 season, having a 25–3–0–0 record with a .918 save percentage while having a team record 2.41 goals against average (GAA) mark. He received a league rookie of the month honor and became the winner of the F. W. "Dinty" Moore Trophy for having the best GAA in the league among first-year players.

Villalta was selected in the third round (72nd overall) of the 2017 NHL entry draft by the Los Angeles Kings. He returned to the Greyhounds for the 2017–18 season and had a 40–5–2–2 record while playing 49 games, having a save percentage of .908 with a GAA of 2.58. He was named third-team All-OHL and was the recipient of the Dave Pinkney Trophy for best GAA. He signed a three-year, entry-level contract with the Kings on April 27, 2018. In the 2018–19 season with the Greyhounds, Villalta had a record of 33–15–5–0 in 51 games played, having a .903 save percentage and 3.03 GAA.

Villalta played for the Ontario Reign of the American Hockey League (AHL) in 2019–20, playing 22 games while having a record of 10–6–2–0, a save percentage of .899 and a 3.27 goals against average. He also saw action in eight games with the Fort Wayne Komets of the ECHL, recording a save percentage of .864. He returned to the Reign in 2020–21 and had an 8–8–1 record while being one of the members of the Kings' taxi squad. The following season, he ranked third in the league with 28 wins and was fourth with 2660:32 minutes played; in 46 games played his record was 28–10–7, and he helped the team reach the AHL playoffs while having a .903 save percentage.

Villalta signed a one-year, two-way contract extension with Los Angeles on July 1, 2022. He played in 22 games and had a record of 12–8–1 in the 2022–23 season. He became a free agent after the season and signed with the Arizona Coyotes. He was sent to their AHL affiliate, the Tucson Roadrunners, and became the team's top goaltender and one of the best in the league. He started the season with a record of 22–11–1 with a 2.58 GAA and .913 save percentage, being named an AHL All-Star before being recalled to the Coyotes. He made his NHL debut on February 16, 2024, stopping each of the four shots he faced while playing most of the third period in a 5–1 loss to the Carolina Hurricanes. Three days later, he made his first start against the Edmonton Oilers, resulting in a 6–3 loss.

As a free agent at the conclusion of his contract with the Mammoth, Villalta was signed to a one-year, two-way contract with the Buffalo Sabres on July 4, 2026.

== Personal life ==
Villalta was born on June 3, 1999, in Kingston, Ontario. His twin brother, Wyatt, played ice hockey as well, while his sister, Rachel, played college soccer.

== Career statistics ==
			Regular season									Playoffs
Season	Team	League	GP	W	L	OT	MIN	GA	SO	GAA	SV%	GP	W	L	MIN	GA	SO	GAA	SV%
2016–17	Sault Ste. Marie Greyhounds	OHL	33	25	3	0	1,795	72	1	2.42	.918	2	1	1	100	—	0	4.20	.841
2017–18	Sault Ste. Marie Greyhounds	OHL	49	40	5	4	2,904	125	3	2.58	.908	24	14	9	1,416	—	1	3.30	.893
2018–19	Sault Ste. Marie Greyhounds	OHL	51	33	12	5	2,930	148	1	3.03	.903	11	6	5	630	—	1	3.43	.885
2019–20	Fort Wayne Komets	ECHL	8	4	3	1	468	30	0	3.85	.864	—	—	—	—	—	—	—	—
2019–20	Ontario Reign	AHL	22	10	6	2	1,157	63	0	3.27	.899	—	—	—	—	—	—	—	—
2020–21	Ontario Reign	AHL	18	8	8	1	1,016	58	1	3.43	.889	1	0	1	69	5	0	4.35	.828
2021–22	Ontario Reign	AHL	46	28	10	10	2,661	132	0	2.98	.903	3	2	1	168	13	0	4.64	.829
2022–23	Ontario Reign	AHL	22	12	8	1	1,288	57	1	2.65	.910	—	—	—	—	—	—	—	—
2023–24	Tucson Roadrunners	AHL	51	31	17	3	3,049	129	3	2.54	.911	2	0	2	117	5	0	2.56	.914
2023–24	Arizona Coyotes	NHL	2	0	1	0	72	5	0	4.17	.828	—	—	—	—	—	—	—	—
2024–25	Tucson Roadrunners	AHL	43	18	22	3	2,532	128	4	3.03	.905	1	0	1	58	4	0	4.12	.826
2024–25	Utah Hockey Club	NHL	1	1	0	0	60	3	0	3.00	.903	—	—	—	—	—	—	—	—
2025–26	Tucson Roadrunners	AHL	33	16	12	3	1914	99	1	3.10	.895	—	—	—	—	—	—	—	—
NHL totals			2	1	1	0	132	8	0	3.64	.867	—	—	—	—	—	—	—	—
