= Markus Phillips =

Canadian ice hockey player (born 1999)

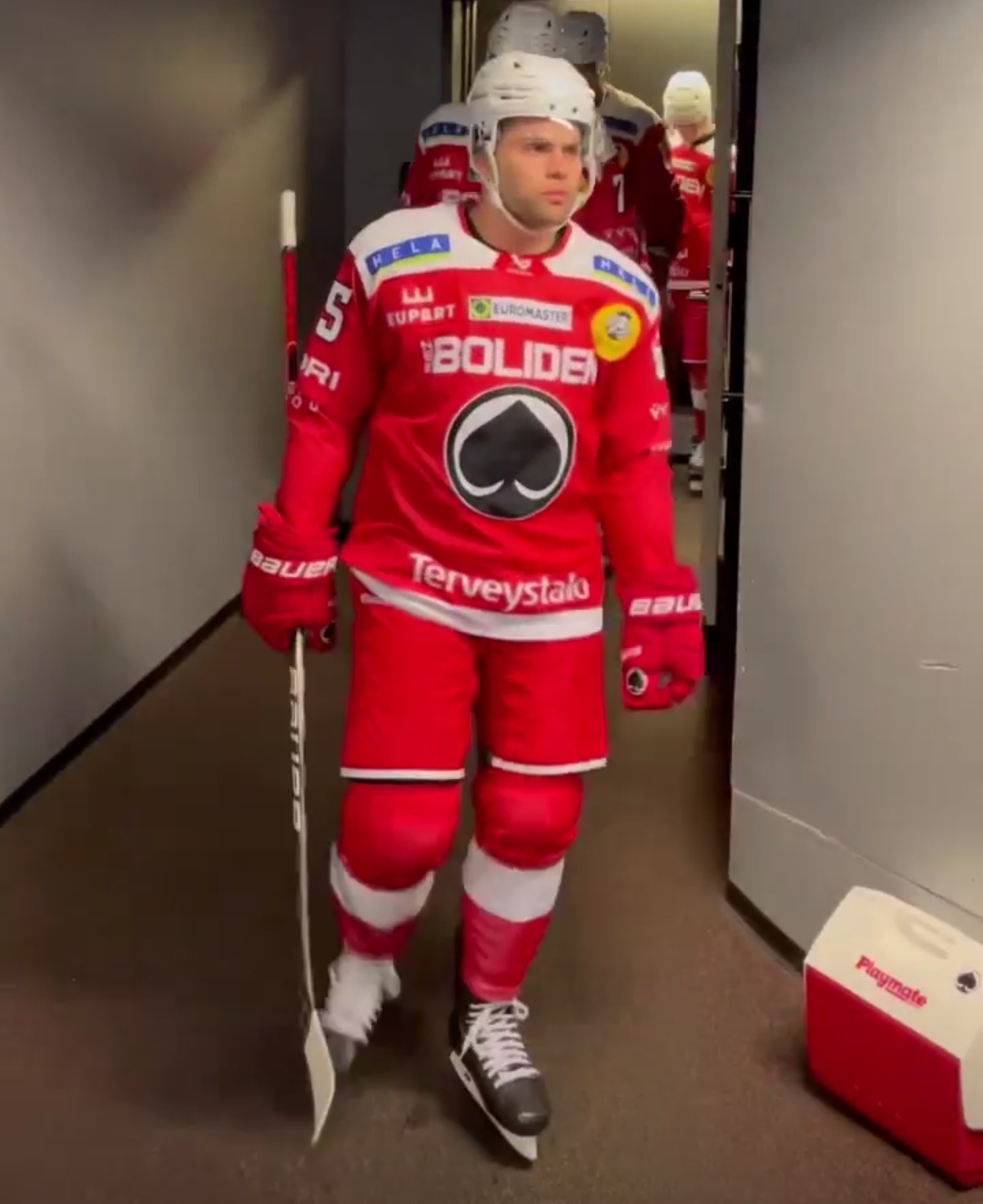
- Born: 21 March 1999 (age 27) Port Perry, Ontario, Canada
- Height: 6 ft 1 in (185 cm)
- Weight: 201 lb (91 kg; 14 st 5 lb)
- Position: Defence
- Shoots: Left
- team Former teams: Free agent Ontario Reign; Manitoba Moose; Porin Ässät; Fehérvár AV19; Torpedo Nizhny Novgorod; SKA Saint Petersburg
- NHL draft: 118th overall, 2017; Los Angeles Kings
- Playing career: 2019–present

Markus Phillips (born 21 March 1999) is a Canadian professional ice hockey defenceman who is currently an unrestricted free agent. He most recently played for SKA Saint Petersburg in the Kontinental Hockey League (KHL). He is a Los Angeles Kings draft pick from the 2017 NHL entry draft.

== Playing career ==
Phillips played junior hockey with the Newmarket Hurricanes of the Ontario Junior Hockey League (OJHL), before moving to the major junior level in the Ontario Hockey League (OHL) with the Owen Sound Attack.

Following his second season with the Attack, Phillips was selected in the 2017 NHL entry draft in the fourth-round, 118th overall, by the Los Angeles Kings. He was later signed to a three-year, entry-level contract with the Kings on April 30, 2019.

Phillips spent the duration of his contract with the Kings, assigned to AHL affiliate, the Ontario Reign.

In the final season of the rookie contract with the Kings in 2021–22, Phillips was traded to the Winnipeg Jets organization in exchange for Nelson Nogier on March 21, 2022. He was immediately assigned to continue in the AHL with the Manitoba Moose, where he played out the remainder of the season.

As a pending restricted free agent with the Jets, Phillips was later un-signed by the club and opted to leave North America to sign a signing a one-year contract with Finnish club, Porin Ässät of the Liiga, on August 5, 2022.

After a lone season with Hungarian club, Fehérvár AV19 in the ICE Hockey League, Phillips continued his career abroad in securing a one-year contract with Russian club, Torpedo Nizhny Novgorod of the KHL, on June 11, 2024.

== Career statistics ==
=== Regular season and playoffs ===
| | | | Regular season | | | | | Playoffs |
| Season | Team | League | GP | G | A | Pts | PIM | GP | G | A | Pts | PIM |
|---|---|---|---|---|---|---|---|---|---|---|---|---|
| 2014–15 | Newmarket Hurricanes | OJHL | 2 | 0 | 1 | 1 | 4 | — | — | — | — | — |
| 2015–16 | Owen Sound Attack | OHL | 63 | 3 | 9 | 12 | 22 | 6 | 0 | 0 | 0 | 2 |
| 2016–17 | Owen Sound Attack | OHL | 66 | 13 | 30 | 43 | 44 | 17 | 0 | 5 | 5 | 10 |
| 2017–18 | Owen Sound Attack | OHL | 68 | 10 | 29 | 39 | 34 | 10 | 0 | 3 | 3 | 4 |
| 2018–19 | Owen Sound Attack | OHL | 31 | 2 | 8 | 10 | 28 | — | — | — | — | — |
| 2018–19 | Guelph Storm | OHL | 31 | 3 | 13 | 16 | 20 | 24 | 2 | 2 | 4 | 8 |
| 2019–20 | Ontario Reign | AHL | 5 | 0 | 0 | 0 | 4 | — | — | — | — | — |
| 2019–20 | Fort Wayne Komets | ECHL | 20 | 0 | 6 | 6 | 18 | — | — | — | — | — |
| 2019–20 | London Knights | OHL | 25 | 3 | 8 | 11 | 13 | — | — | — | — | — |
| 2020–21 | Ontario Reign | AHL | 31 | 3 | 7 | 10 | 14 | 1 | 0 | 0 | 0 | 0 |
| 2021–22 | Ontario Reign | AHL | 38 | 1 | 4 | 5 | 18 | — | — | — | — | — |
| 2021–22 | Manitoba Moose | AHL | 7 | 0 | 2 | 2 | 8 | — | — | — | — | — |
| 2022–23 | Ässät | Liiga | 33 | 0 | 4 | 4 | 10 | 5 | 0 | 0 | 0 | 0 |
| 2023–24 | Fehérvár AV19 | ICEHL | 38 | 5 | 11 | 16 | 14 | 7 | 1 | 2 | 3 | 4 |
| 2024–25 | Torpedo Nizhny Novgorod | KHL | 58 | 2 | 11 | 13 | 16 | 4 | 0 | 0 | 0 | 2 |
| 2025–26 | SKA Saint Petersburg | KHL | 67 | 3 | 10 | 13 | 22 | 5 | 0 | 2 | 2 | 0 |
| AHL totals | | | 81 | 4 | 13 | 17 | 44 | 1 | 0 | 0 | 0 | 0 |
| Liiga totals | | | 33 | 0 | 4 | 4 | 10 | 5 | 0 | 0 | 0 | 0 |
| KHL totals | | | 125 | 5 | 21 | 26 | 38 | 9 | 0 | 2 | 2 | 2 |

=== International ===
| Year | Team | Event | Result | GP | G | A | Pts | PIM |
|---|---|---|---|---|---|---|---|---|
| 2015 | Canada Red | U17 | 4th | 6 | 0 | 1 | 1 | 2 |
| 2016 | Canada | U18 | 4th | 7 | 0 | 2 | 2 | 2 |
| 2016 | Canada | IH18 | 5th | 4 | 0 | 1 | 1 | 6 |
| 2019 | Canada | WJC | 6th | 5 | 0 | 3 | 3 | 6 |
| Junior totals | | | | 22 | 0 | 7 | 7 | 16 |
