= Isaac Ratcliffe =

Canadian ice hockey player (born 1999)

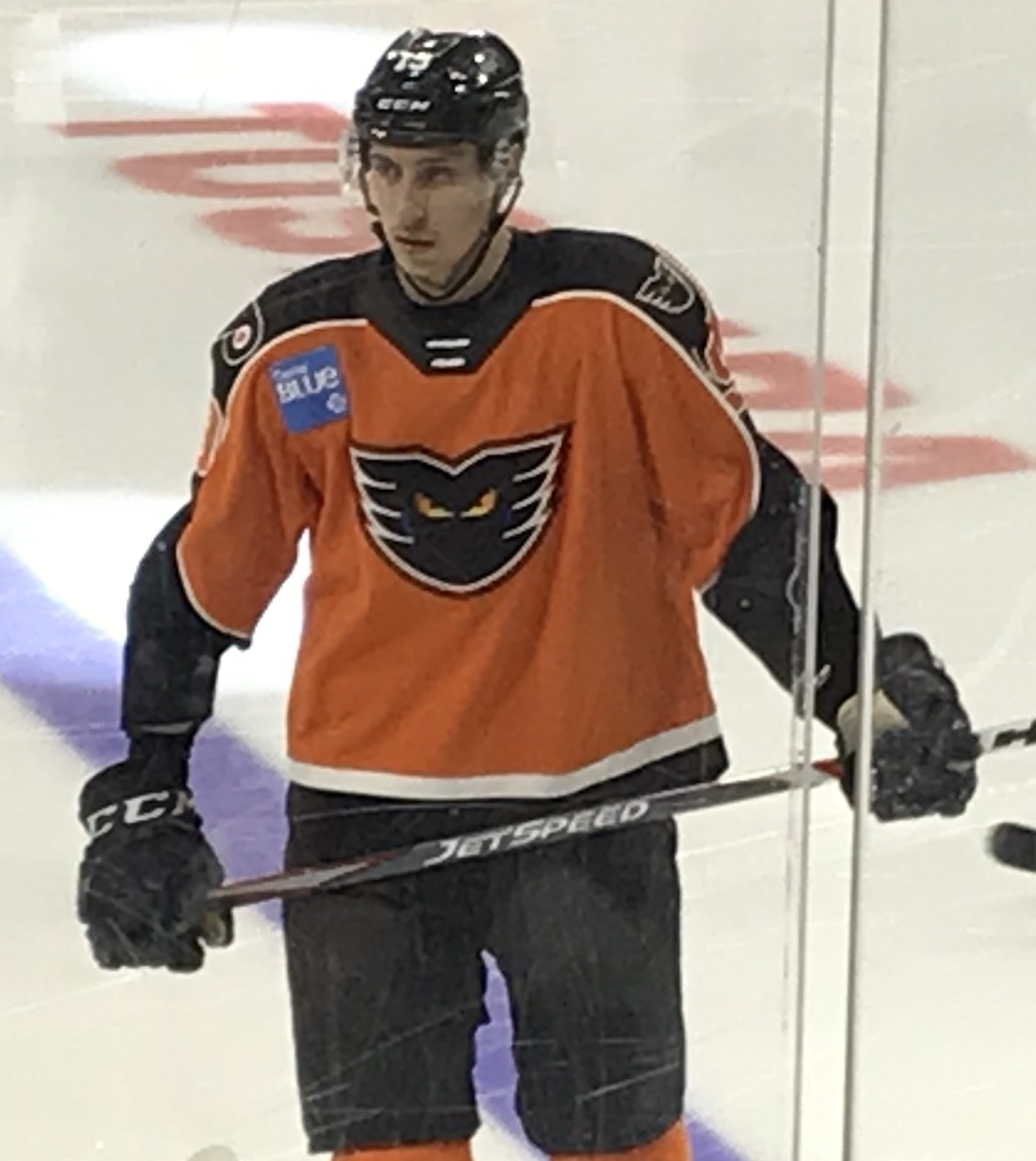
- Ratcliffe with the Phantoms in 2020
- Born: February 15, 1999 (age 27) London, Ontario, Canada
- Height: 6 ft 6 in (198 cm)
- Weight: 200 lb (91 kg; 14 st 4 lb)
- Position: Left wing
- Shoots: Left
- ICEHL team Former teams: HC Bolzano; Philadelphia Flyers
- NHL draft: 35th overall, 2017; Philadelphia Flyers
- Playing career: 2018–present

Isaac Ratcliffe (born February 15, 1999) is a Canadian professional ice hockey left wing for HC Bolzano of the ICE Hockey League (ICEHL). He was selected by the Philadelphia Flyers in the second round, 35th overall, of the 2017 NHL entry draft.

== Early life ==
Ratcliffe was born on February 15, 1999, in London, Ontario, to Elaine and Al Ratcliffe. Born into a basketball family, Ratcliffe followed his older brother Landon into ice hockey, learning to skate at the age of three and playing in coordinated games two years later. He was childhood friends with fellow London native and future National Hockey League (NHL) player Nick Suzuki, and the pair would play ice hockey, golf, and soccer together. Originally a defenceman, Ratcliffe was converted to a power forward at the age of 11, as he spent most of his time in his team's offensive zone. He and Suzuki went on to play minor ice hockey together for the London Jr. Knights of Alliance Hockey. In his final season with the London Jr. Knights of the Alliance Hockey, Ratcliffe recorded 22 goals and 27 assists for a total of 49 points in 32 games.

== Playing career ==
=== Junior ===
The Guelph Storm of the Ontario Hockey League (OHL) drafted Ratcliffe in the first round, 15th overall, of the 2015 OHL Priority Selection. He joined the team for the 2015–16 OHL season, scoring his first junior ice hockey goal on October 3, 2015, against goaltender Evan Cormier of the Saginaw Spirit. Ratcliffe finished his first season in Guelph with five goals and eight assists in 46 games. His rookie season was limited by a number of injuries, but he soon saw an offensive surge during the 2016–17 OHL season, with seven goals and 10 assists in the first 19 games of the season. With 43 games into his sophomore season, Ratcliffe had nearly tripled his previous-season totals, with 20 goals and 18 assists, and he was one of two Guelph Storm skaters named to the 2017 CHL/NHL Top Prospects Game. He finished the season with 56 points in 67 games, including a team-leading 28 goals, and was named the Storm's Most Improved Player. In June 2017, the Philadelphia Flyers selected Ratcliffe in the second round, 35th overall, of the 2017 NHL entry draft, and he signed an entry-level contract with them in August 2017.

After joining the Flyers for training camp, Ratcliffe returned to the Storm for the 2017–18 OHL season. He had trouble early in the season, struggling with his speed and accuracy, but soon picked up his play with 37 goals through his first 61 games. Finishing the season with 68 points and a career-high 41 goals, Ratcliffe earned the Glad Mowatt Most Valuable Player Award, Fay Scott Memorial Award, and Top Scorer Award at the Storm's end-of-year team banquet. When the Guelph season concluded, Ratcliffe joined the Lehigh Valley Phantoms, the Flyers' American Hockey League (AHL) affiliate, for the end of their 2017–18 season. He played two AHL games that season, scoring his first professional ice hockey goal on April 13, 2018, in a 5–2 win over the Bridgeport Sound Tigers.

Ratcliffe rejoined the Storm for the 2018–19 OHL season, where he was named captain. On March 18, 2019, Ratcliffe scored his 49th and 50th goals of the season in a 5–2 defeat of the Erie Otters, making him the fifth player in franchise history to reach the 50-goal mark in a single season. He finished the regular season with 50 goals and 82 points in 65 games, and he took home the Mickey Renaud Captain's Trophy for leadership in the OHL that spring. Ratcliffe added another 15 goals and 30 points in 24 OHL playoff games as he captained the Storm to their first J. Ross Robertson Cup in six years and a berth in the Memorial Cup. Although the Storm fell in the Memorial Cup semifinal round, Ratcliffe added an additional 15 goals and 14 assists in 24 games, and he was named to the Memorial Cup All-Star Team.

=== Professional ===
Ratcliffe joined the Phantoms again in 2019–20 for his first full season of professional ice hockey. He struggled with the transition from junior to professional level, particularly the greater resistance he faced from opposing skaters, but showed signs of improvement before the COVID-19 pandemic forced the cancellation of the 2019–20 AHL season. He finished the year with six goals and 15 points in 53 games with the Phantoms. He was also limited by injuries during the 2020–21 AHL season, with two goals and six assists in only 22 games.

Facing a slew of injuries to their forwards, the Flyers called Ratcliffe up to the NHL on January 27, 2022, to play on the fourth line with Zack MacEwen and Connor Bunnaman for their January 29 game against the Los Angeles Kings.

During the 2022–23 season, Ratcliffe was traded by the Flyers to the Nashville Predators in exchange for future considerations on February 26, 2023. Ratcliffe played out the remainder of his contract with the Predators AHL affiliate, the Milwaukee Admirals, increasing his offensive output in posting 16 points through 21 regular season games, and adding 3 goals in first playoff appearance in the AHL.

Ratcliffe as a pending restricted free agent was not tendered a qualifying offer by the Predators and was released as a free agent. On July 18, 2023, he opted to sign a one-year contract with the lone AHL independent club, the Chicago Wolves, on July 18, 2023. On August 25, 2023, Ratcliffe accepted an invitation to attend the St. Louis Blues 2023 training camp on a professional tryout contract.

After two further seasons with the Milwaukee Admirals, Ratcliffe left as a free agent and signed his first contract abroad in agreeing to a one-year contract with Italian club, HC Bolzano of the ICEHL, on June 10, 2026.

== Career statistics ==
			Regular season					Playoffs
Season	Team	League	GP	G	A	Pts	PIM	GP	G	A	Pts	PIM
2014–15	London Jr. Knights	ALLIANCE	32	22	27	49	16	13	6	1	7	12
2015–16	Guelph Storm	OHL	46	5	8	13	24	—	—	—	—	—
2016–17	Guelph Storm	OHL	67	28	26	54	65	—	—	—	—	—
2017–18	Guelph Storm	OHL	67	41	27	68	58	6	5	4	9	8
2017–18	Lehigh Valley Phantoms	AHL	2	1	0	1	4	—	—	—	—	—
2018–19	Guelph Storm	OHL	65	50	32	82	105	24	15	15	30	20
2019–20	Lehigh Valley Phantoms	AHL	53	6	9	15	40	—	—	—	—	—
2020–21	Lehigh Valley Phantoms	AHL	22	2	6	8	15	—	—	—	—	—
2021–22	Lehigh Valley Phantoms	AHL	59	11	17	28	61	—	—	—	—	—
2021–22	Philadelphia Flyers	NHL	10	1	3	4	10	—	—	—	—	—
2022–23	Lehigh Valley Phantoms	AHL	26	2	2	4	22	—	—	—	—	—
2022–23	Milwaukee Admirals	AHL	21	4	12	16	46	10	3	1	4	8
2023–24	Chicago Wolves	AHL	66	7	3	10	60	—	—	—	—	—
2024–25	Milwaukee Admirals	AHL	13	1	2	3	25	—	—	—	—	—
2025–26	Milwaukee Admirals	AHL	58	9	15	24	61	3	0	0	0	2
NHL totals			10	1	3	4	10	—	—	—	—	—
