= Mac Hollowell =

Canadian ice hockey player (born 1998)

- Hollowell with the Iserlohn Roosters in 2026
- Born: September 26, 1998 (age 27) Niagara Falls, Ontario, Canada
- Height: 5 ft 10 in (178 cm)
- Weight: 170 lb (77 kg; 12 st 2 lb)
- Position: Defence
- Shoots: Right
- DEL team Former teams: Iserlohn Roosters; Toronto Maple Leafs; Lada Togliatti; CSKA Moscow
- NHL draft: 118th overall, 2018; Toronto Maple Leafs
- Playing career: 2018–present

Mac Hollowell (born September 26, 1998) is a Canadian professional ice hockey defenceman for the Iserlohn Roosters of the Deutsche Eishockey Liga (DEL).

== Playing career ==
=== Early career ===
Hollowell played 38 games with the Niagara Rivermen Minor Midget hockey club, where he tallied 8 goals and 19 assists for 27 points. He then played one season of junior B hockey with the Niagara Falls Canucks under the leadership of Frank Pietrangelo. He was eventually drafted by the Sault Ste. Marie Greyhounds in the 12th round of the 2014 Ontario Hockey League (OHL) Priority Selection Draft. Hollowell recorded his first career OHL goal on December 28, 2014, against the Saginaw Spirit. He ended his rookie season totalling two goals and four assists in 11 games.

Although eligible for the 2017 NHL entry draft, Hollowell went undrafted. However, he drew some interest from the Toronto Maple Leafs who invited him to their prospect camp during the summer. He returned to the Greyhounds where he ended the 2017–18 season fifth amongst leading scoring OHL defencemen with 12 goals and 44 assists in 63 games. Due to his play, Hollowell was drafted in the fourth round of the 2018 NHL entry draft by the Toronto Maple Leafs. He was invited to attend the Toronto Marlies training camp but was returned to the Greyhounds prior to the 2018–19 season. Prior to the start of his season as an overager, Hollowell was named an alternate captain alongside Jordan Sambrook and Morgan Frost. Hollowell finished his final season in the OHL with 24 goals, 53 assists, and 77 points in 64 games. As a result, he was selected for the OHL First All-Star Team.

=== Professional ===
On March 7, 2019, the Maple Leafs signed Hollowell to an entry-level contract. At the conclusion of his OHL career, Hollowell joined the Toronto Marlies of the American Hockey League (AHL) during their Calder Cup run. Upon making the jump to professional hockey, Hollowell remarked "The guys are bigger and older and positionally smarter, so I'm just trying to find ways to play my game. It's definitely been a big adjustment, but I like it." After attending the Toronto Maple Leafs training camp, Hollowell was reassigned to the Marlies for the 2019–20 season. However, he began the season with the Leafs ECHL affiliate, the Newfoundland Growlers.

On October 6, 2019, Hollowell recorded his first career ECHL goal in an overtime win against the Reading Royals. He made his AHL regular season debut in an 8–5 win over the Texas Stars on November 16, 2019. However, on November 24 he was reassigned to the ECHL.

On October 28, 2020, with the upcoming 2020–21 season delayed by the ongoing pandemic, Hollowell was loaned to Finnish second division club, TUTO Hockey of the Mestis. He registered 6 points through 6 games before returning to North America for the Maple Leafs training camp. On November 23, 2022, Hollowell made his NHL debut against the New Jersey Devils.

After four seasons within the Maple Leafs organization, Hollowell left as an unrestricted free agent and was signed to a one-year, two-way contract with the New York Rangers for the 2023–24 season on July 2, 2023. He was placed on waivers by the Rangers on October 1, 2023 and after going unclaimed, was assigned to New York's AHL affiliate, the Hartford Wolf Pack to start the 2023–24 season. He spent the season in the AHL, playing in 64 games, scoring three goals and 44 points. He represented the Wolf Pack at the 2024 AHL All-Star Classic. He also made ten playoff appearances with Hartford, registering three points.

On July 1, 2024, Hollowell signed as a free agent to a one-year, two-way contract with the Pittsburgh Penguins. After going unclaimed on waivers, he was assigned to Pittsburgh's AHL affiliate, the Wilkes-Barre/Scranton Penguins, to begin the 2024–25 season. Through the campaign, Hollowell led the Penguins blueline in scoring, posting 1 goal and 30 assists for 31 points in 56 regular season games.

As a pending free agent, Holloway left the Penguins and opted to continue his career abroad by agreeing to a one-year contract with the Kontinental Hockey League team, Lokomotiv Yaroslavl, on June 11, 2025. In August 2025, Hollowell was traded from Lokomotiv Yaroslavl to Lada Togliatti in exchange for monetary compensation and signed a contract through the end of the 2025–26 season. He made 28 appearances with Togliatti before ending his lone season in the KHL with HC CSKA Moscow.

As a free agent, Hollowell continued his career abroad by agreeing to a one-year contract with German club, Iserlohn Roosters of the DEL, on August 6, 2026.

== Personal life ==
Hollowell was born to parents Jenn Sheldon and Lenn Hollowell.

== Career statistics ==
			Regular season					Playoffs
Season	Team	League	GP	G	A	Pts	PIM	GP	G	A	Pts	PIM
2014–15	Niagara Falls Canucks	GOJHL	47	8	29	37	40	4	0	2	2	4
2014–15	Sault Ste. Marie Greyhounds	OHL	11	2	4	6	4	—	—	—	—	—
2015–16	Sault Ste. Marie Greyhounds	OHL	58	1	20	21	23	12	1	3	4	14
2016–17	Sault Ste. Marie Greyhounds	OHL	63	3	20	23	19	11	0	3	3	8
2017–18	Sault Ste. Marie Greyhounds	OHL	63	12	44	56	18	24	2	14	16	22
2018–19	Sault Ste. Marie Greyhounds	OHL	64	24	53	77	62	11	2	9	11	10
2018–19	Toronto Marlies	AHL	—	—	—	—	—	9	0	1	1	0
2019–20	Newfoundland Growlers	ECHL	19	3	10	13	21	—	—	—	—	—
2019–20	Toronto Marlies	AHL	34	3	9	12	25	—	—	—	—	—
2020–21	TUTO Hockey	Mestis	6	2	4	6	6	—	—	—	—	—
2020–21	Toronto Marlies	AHL	27	2	8	10	10	—	—	—	—	—
2021–22	Toronto Marlies	AHL	45	5	21	26	44	—	—	—	—	—
2022–23	Toronto Marlies	AHL	18	0	13	13	8	—	—	—	—	—
2022–23	Toronto Maple Leafs	NHL	6	0	2	2	2	—	—	—	—	—
2023–24	Hartford Wolf Pack	AHL	64	3	41	44	63	10	0	3	3	12
2024–25	Wilkes-Barre/Scranton Penguins	AHL	56	1	30	31	50	—	—	—	—	—
2025–26	Lada Togliatti	KHL	28	1	10	11	4	—	—	—	—	—
2025–26	CSKA Moscow	KHL	30	2	6	8	2	9	0	1	1	2
NHL totals			6	0	2	2	2	—	—	—	—	—
KHL totals			58	3	16	19	6	9	0	1	1	2

== Awards and honours ==
Award	Year
OHL
First All-Star Team	2019
AHL
2024 AHL All-Star Classic	2024
