= 2018–19 OHL season =

- League: Ontario Hockey League
- Sport: Hockey
- Duration: Preseason; August 31, 2018 – September 16, 2018; Regular season September 19, 2018 – March 17, 2019; Playoffs; March 21, 2019 – May 12, 2019
- Teams: 20
- TV partner(s): Rogers TV, Shaw TV, YourTV, Sportsnet

Draft
- Top draft pick: Quinton Byfield
- Picked by: Sudbury Wolves

Regular season
- Hamilton Spectator Trophy: Ottawa 67's (4)
- Season MVP: Ukko-Pekka Luukkonen (Sudbury Wolves)
- Top scorer: Jason Robertson (Kingston/Niagara)

Playoffs
- Playoffs MVP: Nick Suzuki (Storm)
- Finals champions: Guelph Storm (4)
- Runners-up: Ottawa 67's

OHL seasons
- 2017–18 2019–20

2018–19 CHL season
- League: Canadian Hockey League
- Sport: Hockey
- Duration: OHL; September 2018 – May 2019; QMJHL; September 2018 – May 2019; WHL; September 2018 – May 2019
- Teams: 60
- TV partner(s): TVA Sports, Rogers Sportsnet/Rogers TV, Shaw TV
- Season MVP: Alexis Lafrenière (Rimouski Océanic) (QMJHL)
- Top scorer: Jason Robertson (Kingston/Niagara) (OHL)

Memorial Cup
- Finals champions: Rouyn-Noranda Huskies (QMJHL) (1st title)
- Runners-up: Halifax Mooseheads (QMJHL)

The 2018–19 OHL season was the 39th season of the Ontario Hockey League, in which twenty teams played 68 games each according to the regular season schedule, from September 19, 2018 to March 17, 2019.

The Guelph Storm won the J. Ross Robertson Cup as they defeated the Ottawa 67's in six games to represent the Ontario Hockey League in the 2019 Memorial Cup, which was hosted by the Halifax Mooseheads of the QMJHL at the Scotiabank Centre in Halifax, Nova Scotia from May 17–26, 2019.

== Regular season ==
=== Final standings ===
Note: DIV = Division; GP = Games played; W = Wins; L = Losses; OTL = Overtime losses; SL = Shootout losses; GF = Goals for; GA = Goals against; PTS = Points; x = clinched playoff berth; y = clinched division title; z = clinched conference title

=== Eastern conference ===
Rank	Team	DIV	GP	W	L	OTL	SL	PTS	GF	GA
1	z-Ottawa 67's	East	68	50	12	4	2	106	296	183
2	y-Niagara IceDogs	Central	68	44	17	7	0	95	326	209
3	x-Oshawa Generals	East	68	44	20	4	0	92	288	216
4	x-Sudbury Wolves	Central	68	43	20	3	2	91	254	206
5	x-Mississauga Steelheads	Central	68	32	29	5	2	71	239	250
6	x-Peterborough Petes	East	68	33	31	3	1	70	234	256
7	x-North Bay Battalion	Central	68	30	33	3	2	65	230	281
8	x-Hamilton Bulldogs	East	68	29	34	3	2	63	241	283
9	Barrie Colts	Central	68	26	38	3	1	56	221	245
10	Kingston Frontenacs	East	68	14	52	1	1	30	144	307

=== Western conference ===
Rank	Team	DIV	GP	W	L	OTL	SL	PTS	GF	GA
1	z-London Knights	Midwest	68	46	15	6	1	99	299	211
2	y-Saginaw Spirit	West	68	45	17	3	3	96	292	218
3	x-Sault Ste. Marie Greyhounds	West	68	44	16	7	1	96	292	224
4	x-Guelph Storm	Midwest	68	40	18	6	4	90	308	230
5	x-Kitchener Rangers	Midwest	68	34	30	3	1	72	251	267
6	x-Owen Sound Attack	Midwest	68	31	31	4	2	68	224	274
7	x-Sarnia Sting	West	68	28	33	5	2	63	271	300
8	x-Windsor Spitfires	West	68	25	33	5	5	60	216	257
9	Erie Otters	Midwest	68	26	38	3	1	56	230	300
10	Flint Firebirds	West	68	16	46	6	0	38	212	350

=== Scoring leaders ===
Note: GP = Games played; G = Goals; A = Assists; Pts = Points; PIM = Penalty minutes

Player	Team	GP	G	A	Pts	PIM
Jason Robertson	Kingston/Niagara	62	48	69	117	42
Justin Brazeau	North Bay Battalion	68	61	52	113	40
Tye Felhaber	Ottawa 67's	68	59	50	109	45
Morgan Frost	Sault Ste. Marie Greyhounds	58	37	72	109	45
Kevin Hancock	Owen Sound/London	70	52	55	107	38
Arthur Kaliyev	Hamilton Bulldogs	67	51	51	102	22
Ben Jones	Niagara IceDogs	68	41	61	102	82
Akil Thomas	Niagara IceDogs	63	38	64	102	40
Nate Schnarr	Guelph Storm	65	34	68	102	58
Greg Meireles	Kitchener Rangers	68	36	61	97	40

=== Leading goaltenders ===
Note: GP = Games played; Mins = Minutes played; W = Wins; L = Losses: OTL = Overtime losses; SL = Shootout losses; GA = Goals Allowed; SO = Shutouts; GAA = Goals against average

Player	Team	GP	Mins	W	L	OTL	SL	GA	SO	Sv%	GAA
Michael DiPietro	Windsor/Ottawa	38	2174	23	12	0	1	87	4	0.911	2.40
Cedrick Andree	Ottawa 67's	45	2634	34	5	2	2	109	4	0.910	2.48
Ukko-Pekka Luukkonen	Sudbury Wolves	53	3078	38	10	2	2	128	6	0.920	2.50
Kyle Keyser	Oshawa Generals	48	2707	32	8	3	0	124	2	0.916	2.75
Ivan Prosvetov	Saginaw Spirit	53	2996	36	11	2	1	147	4	0.910	2.94

== Playoffs ==
Conference quarterfinals	Conference semifinals
1	Ottawa	4
8	Hamilton	0
1	Ottawa	4
4	Sudbury	0
4	Sudbury	4
5	Mississauga	0
Eastern Conference
2	Niagara	4
7	North Bay	1
2	Niagara	2
3	Oshawa	4
3	Oshawa	4
6	Peterborough	1
1	London	4
8	Windsor	0
1	London	3
4	Guelph	4
4	Guelph	4
5	Kitchener	0
Western Conference
2	Saginaw	4
7	Sarnia	0
2	Saginaw	4
3	Sault Ste. Marie	2
3	Sault Ste. Marie	4
6	Owen Sound	1

Conference finals
1	Ottawa	4
3	Oshawa	0
4	Guelph	4
2	Saginaw	3

Finals
E1	Ottawa	2
W4	Guelph	4

=== Conference quarterfinals ===
==== Eastern conference quarterfinals ====
===== (1) Ottawa 67's vs. (8) Hamilton Bulldogs =====
March 22	Hamilton Bulldogs	3 – 9	Ottawa 67's	TD Place Arena	Recap
Eric Henderson (1) - 19:24		First period	7:14 - pp - Sasha Chmelevski (1)
Matthew Strome (1) - 8:25		Second period	11:33 - pp - Kody Clark (1); 16:02 - Kyle Maksimovich (1); 17:48 - Sasha Chmelevski (2)
Kade Landry (1) - pp - 7:55		Third period	1:05 - Nikita Okhotiuk (1); 6:55 - Noel Hoefenmayer (1); 9:59 - Graeme Clarke (1); 12:01 - pp - Graeme Clarke (2); 15:27 - pp - Kyle Maksimovich (2)
Zachary Roy (32 saves / 41 shots)		Goalie stats	Michael DiPietro (27 saves / 30 shots)

March 24	Hamilton Bulldogs	2 – 5	Ottawa 67's	TD Place Arena	Recap
No scoring		First period	5:37 - sh Mitchell Hoelscher (1); 11:29 - pp - Graeme Clarke (3)
Matthew Strome (2) - pp - 12:54		Second period	14:44 - pp - Graeme Clarke (4); 15:13 - Jack Quinn (1)
Isaac Nurse (1) - 7:55		Third period	19:45 - pp - Graeme Clarke (5)
Zachary Roy (30 saves / 35 shots)		Goalie stats	Michael DiPietro (17 saves / 19 shots)

March 26	Ottawa 67's	2 – 1	Hamilton Bulldogs	FirstOntario Centre	Recap
Mitchell Hoelscher (2) - 16:10		First period	No scoring
Noel Hoefenmayer (2) - pp - 4:38		Second period	14:34 - pp - Arthur Kaliyev (1)
No scoring		Third period	No scoring
Michael DiPietro (18 saves / 19 shots)		Goalie stats	Zachary Roy (22 saves / 24 shots)

March 27	Ottawa 67's	7 – 2	Hamilton Bulldogs	FirstOntario Centre	Recap
Cameron Tolnai (1) - 3:01; Noel Hoefenmayer (3) - pp - 6:13; Merrick Rippon (1) - 13:14; Marco Rossi (1) - pp - 17:15		First period	No scoring
Mitchell Hoelscher (3) - 5:37; Kody Clark (2) - 16:31		Second period	14:25 - pp - Eric Henderson (2)
Lucas Chiodo (1) - 7:48		Third period	14:15 - Frank Jenkins (1)
Michael DiPietro (25 saves / 27 shots)		Goalie stats	Zachary Roy (38 saves / 45 shots)

Ottawa wins series 4 – 0

===== (2) Niagara IceDogs vs. (7) North Bay Battalion =====
March 21	North Bay Battalion	0 – 2	Niagara IceDogs	Meridian Centre	Recap
No scoring		First period	14:06 - pp - Jack Studnicka (1)
No scoring		Second period	17:56 - Jason Robertson (1)
No scoring		Third period	No scoring
Christian Propp (50 saves / 52 shots)		Goalie stats	Stephen Dhillon (23 saves / 23 shots)

March 23	North Bay Battalion	5 – 2	Niagara IceDogs	Meridian Centre	Recap
Daniel Walker (1) - 8:41; Justin Brazeau (1) - 9:38		First period	No scoring
Mitchell Russell (1) - 8:20; Mason Primeau (1) - 11:08		Second period	2:06 - Akil Thomas (1); 5:04 - Ben Jones (1)
Brad Chenier (1) - en - 17:37		Third period	No scoring
Christian Propp (43 saves / 45 shots)		Goalie stats	Stephen Dhillon (22 saves / 26 shots)

March 26	Niagara IceDogs	6 – 0	North Bay Battalion	North Bay Memorial Gardens	Recap
Andrew Bruder (1) - 3:38; Philip Tomasino (1) - 12:59		First period	No scoring
Ivan Lodnia (1) - sh - 4:51		Second period	No scoring
Jack Studnicka (2) - 9:46; Oliver Castleman (1) - 12:15; Philip Tomasino (2) - pp - 12:59		Third period	No scoring
Stephen Dhillon (20 saves / 20 shots)		Goalie stats	Christian Propp (45 saves / 51 shots)

March 28	Niagara IceDogs	5 – 3	North Bay Battalion	North Bay Memorial Gardens	Recap
Drew Hunter (1) - pp - 9:50; Jack Studnicka (3) - 10:55		First period	No scoring
Philip Tomasino (3) - 6:25		Second period	15:10 - Luke Moncada (1)
Oliver Castleman (2) - 15:56; Elijah Roberts (1) - en - 19:43		Third period	18:43 - Brad Chenier (2); 19:20 - Theo Calvas (1)
Stephen Dhillon (23 saves / 26 shots)		Goalie stats	Christian Propp (43 saves / 47 shots)

March 29	North Bay Battalion	0 – 4	Niagara IceDogs	Meridian Centre	Recap
No scoring		First period	3:52 - pp - Jason Robertson (2)
No scoring		Second period	11:52 - pp - Akil Thomas (2)
No scoring		Third period	8:37 - Jacob Paquette (1); 13:25 - pp - Jack Studnicka (4)
Christian Propp (53 saves / 57 shots)		Goalie stats	Stephen Dhillon (27 saves / 27 shots)

Niagara wins series 4 – 1

===== (3) Oshawa Generals vs. (6) Peterborough Petes =====
March 22	Peterborough Petes	0 – 7	Oshawa Generals	Tribute Communities Centre	Recap
No scoring		First period	2:10 - Anthony Salinitri (1); 18:42 - Nando Eggenberger (1)
No scoring		Second period	1:37 - Brett Neumann (1); 18:24 - Brandon Saigeon (1)
No scoring		Third period	11:24 - Kyle MacLean (1); 13:40 - pp - Brett Neumann (2); 18:07 - Ian Blacker (1)
Hunter Jones (40 saves / 47 shots)		Goalie stats	Kyle Keyser (33 saves / 33 shots)

March 24	Peterborough Petes	2 – 8	Oshawa Generals	Tribute Communities Centre	Recap
No scoring		First period	0:31 - Danil Antropov (1); 8:00 - Nicolas Mattinen (1); 8:32 - Tyler Tullio (1)
Christopher Paquette (1) - pp - 5:08		Second period	13:23 - sh - Kyle MacLean (2)
Dustin Hutton (1) - 13:46		Third period	0:32 - pp - Allan McShane (1); 1:14 - Anthony Salinitri (2); 1:46 - Cole Resnick (1); 16:43 - Tyler Tullio (2)
Hunter Jones (2 saves / 5 shots); Tye Austin (22 saves / 27 shots)		Goalie stats	Kyle Keyser (25 saves / 27 shots)

March 26	Oshawa Generals	2 – 3	Peterborough Petes	Peterborough Memorial Centre	Recap
Allan McShane (2) - pp - 0:33; Nicolas Mattinen (2) - 4:22		First period	13:23 - Declan Chisholm (1)
No scoring		Second period	8:41 - Adam Timleck (1)
No scoring		Third period	9:03 - Christopher Paquette (2)
Kyle Keyser (33 saves / 36 shots)		Goalie stats	Hunter Jones (28 saves / 30 shots)

March 28	Oshawa Generals	5 – 2	Peterborough Petes	Peterborough Memorial Centre	Recap
No scoring		First period	6:11 - Declan Chisholm (2)
Anthony Salinitri (3) - 10:49; Kyle MacLean (3) - 15:11		Second period	17:25 - pp - Nick Robertson (1)
Anthony Salinitri (4) - 15:11; Brett Neumann (3) - 17:21; William Ennis (1) - en - 19:29		Third period	No scoring
Kyle Keyser (35 saves / 37 shots)		Goalie stats	Hunter Jones (22 saves / 26 shots)

March 30	Peterborough Petes	2 – 4	Oshawa Generals	Tribute Communities Centre	Recap
Zach Gallant (1) - sh - 1:47		First period	17:50 - pp - Serron Noel (1)
Zach Gallant (2) - pp - 12:09		Second period	7:52 - Cole Resnick (2); 18:07 - pp - Anthony Salinitri (5)
No scoring		Third period	19:04 - en - Kyle MacLean (4)
Hunter Jones (27 saves / 30 shots)		Goalie stats	Kyle Keyser (37 saves / 39 shots)

Oshawa wins series 4 – 1

===== (4) Sudbury Wolves vs. (5) Mississauga Steelheads =====
March 22	Mississauga Steelheads	2 – 5	Sudbury Wolves	Sudbury Community Arena	Recap
No scoring		First period	3:36 - Nolan Hutcheson (1); 8:32 - Nolan Hutcheson (2)
No scoring		Second period	16:53 - Blake Murray (1)
Keean Washkurak (1) - 13:44; Alan Lyszczarczyk (1) - 19:42		Third period	14:24 - Nolan Hutcheson (3); 14:49 - Shane Bulitka (1)
Jacob Ingham (27 saves / 32 shots)		Goalie stats	Ukko-Pekka Luukkonen (29 saves / 31 shots)

March 23	Mississauga Steelheads	2 – 3	OT	Sudbury Wolves	Sudbury Community Arena	Recap
James Hardie (1) - 2:48		First period		7:41 - pp - David Levin (1); 8:38 - Quinton Byfield (1)
Alan Lyszczarczyk (2) - pp - 15:17		Second period		No scoring
No scoring		Third period		No scoring
No scoring		First overtime period		6:38 - David Levin (2)
Jacob Ingham (26 saves / 29 shots)		Goalie stats		Ukko-Pekka Luukkonen (39 saves / 41 shots)

March 24	Sudbury Wolves	5 – 3	Mississauga Steelheads	Paramount Fine Foods Centre	Recap
David Levin (3) - 2:43; Quinton Byfield (2) - pp - 13:04		First period	7:49 - pp - Cole Schwindt (1); 9:58 - Liam Ham (1)
Quinton Byfield (3) - 6:11; Blake Murray (2) - pp - 11:04		Second period	15:50 - pp - Nick McHugh (1)
Cole Candella (1) - sh - en - 19:09		Third period	No scoring
Ukko-Pekka Luukkonen (39 saves / 42 shots)		Goalie stats	Jacob Ingham (36 saves / 40 shots)

March 27	Sudbury Wolves	4 – 1	Mississauga Steelheads	Paramount Fine Foods Centre	Recap
Blake Murray (3) - 7:00; Macauley Carson (1) - pp - 16:20		First period	No scoring
Drake Pilon (1) - 6:50		Second period	10:26 - Nick Isaacson (1)
Peter Stratis (1) - en - 18:59		Third period	No scoring
Ukko-Pekka Luukkonen (32 saves / 33 shots)		Goalie stats	Jacob Ingham (28 saves / 31 shots)

Sudbury wins series 4 – 0

==== Western conference quarterfinals ====
===== (1) London Knights vs. (8) Windsor Spitfires =====
March 22	Windsor Spitfires	3 – 4	London Knights	Budweiser Gardens	Recap
No scoring		First period	2:27 - Evan Bouchard (1); 5:40 - pp - Alex Formenton (1)
Will Cuylle (1) - 9:27		Second period	10:19 - Evan Bouchard (2); 11:55 - pp - Alec Regula (1)
Tyler Angle (1) - pp - 19:24; Connor Corcoran (1) - 19:30		Third period	No scoring
Kari Piiroinen (21 saves / 25 shots)		Goalie stats	Jordan Kooy (23 saves / 26 shots)

March 24	Windsor Spitfires	0 – 5	London Knights	Budweiser Gardens	Recap
No scoring		First period	9:50 - Nathan Dunkley (1); 16:01 - pp - Nathan Dunkley (2)
No scoring		Second period	No scoring
No scoring		Third period	0:23 - Connor McMichael (1); 7:30 - Cole Tymkin (1); 15:05 - Cole Tymkin (2)
Colton Incze (32 saves / 37 shots)		Goalie stats	Jordan Kooy (15 saves / 15 shots)

March 26	London Knights	6 – 3	Windsor Spitfires	WFCU Centre	Recap
Adam Boqvist (1) - pp - 19:10		First period	14:36 - Will Cuylle (2)
Adam Boqvist (2) - pp - 5:21		Second period	7:27 - sh - Tyler Angle (2); 16:22 - Louka Henault (1)
Adam Boqvist (3) - pp - 8:09; Adam Boqvist (4) - 13:07; Liam Foudy (1) - en - 18:33; Alex Formenton (2) - en - 19:17		Third period	No scoring
Jordan Kooy (25 saves / 28 shots)		Goalie stats	Colton Incze (23 saves / 27 shots)

March 28	London Knights	5 – 2	Windsor Spitfires	WFCU Centre	Recap
Adam Boqvist (5) - pp - 1:37; Will Lochead (1) - 17:44		First period	13:54 - Tyler Angle (3)
Kevin Hancock (1) - 12:04; Adam Boqvist (6) - 16:20		Second period	16:22 - Connor Corcoran (2)
Billy Moskal (1) - en - 18:46		Third period	No scoring
Jordan Kooy (23 saves / 25 shots)		Goalie stats	Kari Piiroinen (24 saves / 28 shots)

London wins series 4 – 0

===== (2) Saginaw Spirit vs. (7) Sarnia Sting =====
March 21	Sarnia Sting	3 – 6	Saginaw Spirit	Dow Event Center	Recap
Hugo Leufvenius (1) - 4:41; Hugo Leufvenius (2) - 19:56		First period	No scoring
No scoring		Second period	1:10 - Blade Jenkins (1); 2:56 - Ethan Cardwell (1); 3:12 - Owen Tippett (1)
Nick Grima (1) - 6:33		Third period	6:11 - pp - Cole Perfetti (1); 12:58 - Bode Wilde (1); 18:38 - en - Owen Tippett (2)
Ethan Langevin (18 saves / 23 shots)		Goalie stats	Ivan Prosvetov (34 saves / 37 shots)

March 23	Sarnia Sting	1 – 5	Saginaw Spirit	Dow Event Center	Recap
No scoring		First period	5:42 - pp - Damien Giroux (1); 8:42 - Cole Perfetti (2)
No scoring		Second period	16:39 - pp - Owen Tippett (3)
Jacob Perreault (1) - 11:13		Third period	1:43 - pp - Bode Wilde (2); 14:17 - Damien Giroux (2)
Ethan Langevin (44 saves / 49 shots)		Goalie stats	Ivan Prosvetov (37 saves / 38 shots)

March 26	Saginaw Spirit	6 – 1	Sarnia Sting	Progressive Auto Sales Arena	Recap
Owen Tippett (4) - 2:54; Camaryn Baber (1) - 10:56		First period	11:21 - Justin McCombs (1)
Damien Giroux (3) - sh - 14:34		Second period	No scoring
Justin Murray (1) - sh - 5:11; Ragan O'Grady (1) - sh - 12:15; Jake Goldowski (1) - pp - 17:27		Third period	No scoring
Ivan Prosvetov (34 saves / 35 shots)		Goalie stats	Ethan Langevin (20 saves / 24 shots); Cameron Lamour (5 saves / 7 shots)

March 28	Saginaw Spirit	5 – 4	OT	Sarnia Sting	Progressive Auto Sales Arena	Recap
Owen Tippett (5) - 1:20; Damien Giroux (4) - 18:17		First period		3:01 - Frank Sporviero (1)
No scoring		Second period		9:04 - sh - Ryan McGregor (1); 11:13 - Ryan McGregor (2); 15:09 - Justin McCombs (2)
D.J. Busdeker (1) - 5:20; Ryan McLeod (1) - 16:30		Third period		No scoring
Blade Jenkins (2) - 11:33		First overtime period		No scoring
Ivan Prosvetov (28 saves / 32 shots)		Goalie stats		Cameron Lamour (50 saves / 55 shots)

Saginaw wins series 4 – 0

===== (3) Sault Ste. Marie Greyhounds vs. (6) Owen Sound Attack =====
March 21	Owen Sound Attack	4 – 3	OT	Sault Ste. Marie Greyhounds	GFL Memorial Gardens	Recap
Maksim Sushko (1) - pp - 6:56; Zach Poirier (1) - pp - 19:29		First period		8:00 - pp - Keeghan Howdeshell (1)
Kaleb Pearson (1) - 0:50		Second period		6:08 - Mac Hollowell (1); 13:28 - Jaromír Pytlík (1)
No scoring		Third period		No scoring
Maksim Sushko (2) - pp - 13:53		First overtime period		No scoring
Mack Guzda (43 saves / 46 shots)		Goalie stats		Matt Villalta (35 saves / 39 shots)

March 23	Owen Sound Attack	3 – 6	Sault Ste. Marie Greyhounds	GFL Memorial Gardens	Recap
Sergey Popov (1) - 16:00		First period	4:18 - Tye Kartye (1); 6:27 - Alex Johnston (1); 12:18 - Keeghan Howdeshell (2); 19:47 - Barrett Hayton (1)
Jackson Doherty (1) - 11:11; Kaleb Pearson (2) - 12:07		Second period	No scoring
No scoring		Third period	18:06 - en - Barrett Hayton (2); 19:31 - en - Morgan Frost (1)
Mack Guzda (41 saves / 45 shots)		Goalie stats	Matt Villalta (18 saves / 21 shots)

March 25	Sault Ste. Marie Greyhounds	5 – 2	Owen Sound Attack	Bayshore Community Centre	Recap
Jaromír Pytlík (2) - pp - 6:46; Barrett Hayton (3) - sh - 12:03		First period	15:45 - Barrett Kirwin (1); 19:52 - Aidan Dudas (1)
Keeghan Howdeshell (3) - 8:24		Second period	No scoring
Alex Johnston (2) - 7:42; Holden Wale (1) - 9:13		Third period	No scoring
Matt Villalta (31 saves / 33 shots)		Goalie stats	Mack Guzda (23 saves / 28 shots)

March 27	Sault Ste. Marie Greyhounds	5 – 2	Owen Sound Attack	Bayshore Community Centre	Recap
Jordan Sambrook (1) - pp - 8:00; Morgan Frost (2) - 11:28		First period	16:29 - Brady Lyle (1)
Barrett Hayton (4) - pp - 4:29; Jordan Sambrook (2) - pp - 7:21		Second period	No scoring
Morgan Frost (3) - 0:28		Third period	10:19 - pp - Sergey Popov (2)
Matt Villalta (24 saves / 26 shots)		Goalie stats	Mack Guzda (20 saves / 25 shots)

March 29	Owen Sound Attack	4 – 7	Sault Ste. Marie Greyhounds	GFL Memorial Gardens	Recap
Aidan Dudas (2) - pp - 8:22		First period	10:52 - Keeghan Howdeshell (4)
Zach Poirier (2) - 4:11; Aidan Dudas (3) - 19:49		Second period	2:24 - Jaromír Pytlík (3); 3:09 - Alex Johnston (3)
Daylon Groulx (1) - 6:33		Third period	7:57 - Ryan Roth (1); 9:01 - Tye Kartye (2); 18:06 - en - Cole MacKay (1); 19:20 - en - Keeghan Howdeshell (5)
Mack Guzda (24 saves / 29 shots)		Goalie stats	Matt Villalta (20 saves / 24 shots)

Sault Ste. Marie wins series 4 – 1

===== (4) Guelph Storm vs. (5) Kitchener Rangers =====
March 22	Kitchener Rangers	2 – 4	Guelph Storm	Sleeman Centre	Recap
No scoring		First period	5:33 - pp - Nate Schnarr (1); 16:24 - Zachary Roberts (1)
No scoring		Second period	5:36 - Alexey Toropchenko (1)
Greg Meireles (1) - 1:00; Cole Cameron (1) - 11:26		Third period	18:50 - en - MacKenzie Entwistle (1)
Luke Richardson (30 saves / 33 shots)		Goalie stats	Anthony Popovich (22 saves / 24 shots)

March 24	Kitchener Rangers	0 – 7	Guelph Storm	Sleeman Centre	Recap
No scoring		First period	3:02 - Nick Suzuki (1); 3:56 - Domenico Commisso (1); 14:16 - Fedor Gordeev (1); 19:45 - Liam Hawel (1)
No scoring		Second period	0:45 - Liam Hawel (2); 12:45 - pp - Isaac Ratcliffe (1)
No scoring		Third period	12:11 - pp - Alexey Toropchenko (2)
Luke Richardson (19 saves / 25 shots); Lucas Pfeil (8 saves / 9 shots)		Goalie stats	Anthony Popovich (22 saves / 22 shots)

March 26	Guelph Storm	6 – 3	Kitchener Rangers	Kitchener Memorial Auditorium	Recap
Nick Suzuki (2) - pp - 10:09		First period	10:54 - Joseph Garreffa (1)
Nate Schnarr (2) - 1:14; Isaac Ratcliffe (2) - 2:36; Alexey Toropchenko (3) - 6:15; Nick Suzuki (3) - 6:49		Second period	0:37 - Jonathan Yantsis (1); 7:29 - Jonathan Yantsis (2)
Dmitri Samorukov (1) - en - 19:20		Third period	No scoring
Anthony Popovich (37 saves / 40 shots)		Goalie stats	Luke Richardson (38 saves / 43 shots)

March 28	Guelph Storm	5 – 1	Kitchener Rangers	Kitchener Memorial Auditorium	Recap
MacKenzie Entwistle (2) - pp - 14:59		First period	No scoring
Nick Suzuki (4) - 14:11		Second period	19:03 - Rickard Hugg (1)
Pavel Gogolev (1) - 4:22; Alexey Toropchenko (4) - 13:43; Alexey Toropchenko (5) - en - 18:41		Third period	No scoring
Anthony Popovich (26 saves / 27 shots)		Goalie stats	Luke Richardson (36 saves / 40 shots)

Guelph wins series 4 – 0

=== Conference semifinals ===
==== Eastern conference semifinals ====
===== (1) Ottawa 67's vs. (4) Sudbury Wolves =====
April 5	Sudbury Wolves	5 – 8	Ottawa 67's	TD Place Arena	Recap
David Levin (4) - pp - 17:10		First period	9:45 - Lucas Chiodo (2)
No scoring		Second period	0:49 - Kevin Bahl (1); 11:02 - Tye Felhaber (1); 16:05 - Tye Felhaber (2); 17:00 - Sam Bitten (1)
Blake Murray (4) - 0:31; Cole Candella (2) - 5:27; Adam Ružička (1) - 11:39; Owen Gilhula (1) - 14:54		Third period	5:41 - Lucas Chiodo (3); 9:15 - Lucas Chiodo (4); 14:17 - pp - Tye Felhaber (3)
Ukko-Pekka Luukkonen (18 saves / 23 shots); Jonathan Lemaire (15 saves / 18 shots)		Goalie stats	Michael DiPietro (23 saves / 28 shots)

April 7	Sudbury Wolves	0 – 5	Ottawa 67's	TD Place Arena	Recap
No scoring		First period	18:25 - pp - Lucas Chiodo (5)
No scoring		Second period	10:52 - Noel Hoefenmayer (4); 19:28 - Austen Keating (1)
No scoring		Third period	7:39 - pp - Noel Hoefenmayer (5); 16:24 - Tye Felhaber (4)
Ukko-Pekka Luukkonen (20 saves / 25 shots)		Goalie stats	Michael DiPietro (27 saves / 27 shots)

April 9	Ottawa 67's	8 – 5	Sudbury Wolves	Sudbury Community Arena	Recap
Lucas Chiodo (6) - 14:22		First period	No scoring
Lucas Peric (1) - 3:02; Sasha Chmelevski (3) - 6:05; Kyle Maksimovich (3) - 14:21; Kody Clark (3) - 14:45		Second period	1:20 - pp - Shane Bulitka (2); 3:30 - Owen Gilhula (2); 6:51 - sh - Macauley Carson (2)
Jack Quinn (2) - 2:18; Tye Felhaber (5) - 9:34; Kyle Maksimovich (4) - en - 17:28		Third period	12:41 - Adam Ružička (2); 16:37 - pp - Jack Thompson (1)
Michael DiPietro (21 saves / 26 shots)		Goalie stats	Ukko-Pekka Luukkonen (33 saves / 40 shots)

April 11	Ottawa 67's	3 – 2	3OT	Sudbury Wolves	Sudbury Community Arena	Recap
No scoring		First period		No scoring
Mitchell Hoelscher (4) - 4:19		Second period		13:33 - pp - Adam Ružička (3); 16:41 - Nolan Hutcheson (4)
Kyle Maksimovich (5) - 6:40		Third period		No scoring
Tye Felhaber (6) - pp - 10:15		Third overtime period		No scoring
Michael DiPietro (58 saves / 60 shots)		Goalie stats		Ukko-Pekka Luukkonen (60 saves / 63 shots)

Ottawa wins series 4 – 0

===== (2) Niagara IceDogs vs. (3) Oshawa Generals =====
April 5	Oshawa Generals	2 – 3	OT	Niagara IceDogs	Meridian Centre	Recap
Cole Resnick (3) - 0:13		First period		1:45 - pp - Ben Jones (2)
Brandon Saigeon (2) - 2:54		Second period		12:22 - Drew Hunter (2)
No scoring		Third period		No scoring
No scoring		First overtime period		4:14 - pp - Jason Robertson (3)
Kyle Keyser (47 saves / 50 shots)		Goalie stats		Stephen Dhillon (23 saves / 25 shots)

April 7	Oshawa Generals	1 – 5	Niagara IceDogs	Meridian Centre	Recap
No scoring		First period	5:47 - pp - Ivan Lodnia (2)
Allan McShane (3) - 2:54		Second period	5:05 - Matt Brassard (1); 9:20 - Philip Tomasino (4)
No scoring		Third period	10:56 - Jason Robertson (4); 17:39 - en - Jason Robertson (5)
Kyle Keyser (37 saves / 41 shots)		Goalie stats	Stephen Dhillon (24 saves / 25 shots)

April 9	Niagara IceDogs	1 – 4	Oshawa Generals	Tribute Communities Centre	Recap
No scoring		First period	No scoring
Jason Robertson (6) - 6:27		Second period	18:15 - pp - Serron Noel (2)
No scoring		Third period	2:40 - Kyle Bollers (1); 2:47 - Serron Noel (3); 10:42 - pp - Brett Neumann (4)
Stephen Dhillon (31 saves / 35 shots)		Goalie stats	Kyle Keyser (28 saves / 29 shots)

April 11	Niagara IceDogs	3 – 7	Oshawa Generals	Tribute Communities Centre	Recap
Matthew Philip (1) - 6:02; Akil Thomas (3) - 15:52		First period	7:10 - Anthony Salinitri (6); 11:46 - pp - Giovanni Vallati (1); 14:47 - sh - Kyle MacLean (5)
No scoring		Second period	12:50 - pp - Nando Eggenberger (2)
Jason Robertson (7) - 7:01		Third period	6:15 - Nando Eggenberger (3); 16:13 - Anthony Salinitri (7); 18:03 - pp - Allan McShane (4)
Stephen Dhillon (19 saves / 26 shots)		Goalie stats	Kyle Keyser (36 saves / 39 shots)

April 13	Oshawa Generals	3 – 1	Niagara IceDogs	Meridian Centre	Recap
No Scoring		First period	No Scoring
Cole Resnick (4) - 15:35		Second period	No scoring
Danil Antropov (2) - pp - 7:01; Nando Eggenberger (4) - en - 19:40		Third period	3:34 - pp - Jack Studnicka (5)
Kyle Keyser (36 saves / 37 shots)		Goalie stats	Stephen Dhillon (23 saves / 25 shots)

April 15	Niagara IceDogs	2 – 3	Oshawa Generals	Tribute Communities Centre	Recap
No scoring		First period	18:54 - pp - Brandon Saigeon (3)
Ivan Lodnia (3) - 0:47		Second period	7:01 - pp - Giovanni Vallati (2); 18:55 - Nando Eggenberger (5)
Ivan Lodnia (4) - 4:33		Third period	No scoring
Stephen Dhillon (27 saves / 30 shots)		Goalie stats	Kyle Keyser (34 saves / 36 shots)

Oshawa wins series 4 – 2

==== Western conference semifinals ====
===== (1) London Knights vs. (4) Guelph Storm =====
April 5	Guelph Storm	2 – 3	London Knights	Budweiser Gardens	Recap
No scoring		First period	13:49 - Liam Foudy (2); 19:08 - sh - Josh Nelson (1)
Owen Lalonde (1) - pp - 4:50		Second period	10:18 - pp - Kevin Hancock (2)
MacKenzie Entwistle (3) - 10:34		Third period	No scoring
Anthony Popovich (36 saves / 39 shots)		Goalie stats	Jordan Kooy (22 saves / 24 shots)

April 7	Guelph Storm	0 – 7	London Knights	Budweiser Gardens	Recap
No scoring		First period	3:23 - Kevin Hancock (3)
No scoring		Second period	15:51 - Matvey Guskov (1)
No scoring		Third period	0:31 - Liam Foudy (3); 1:02 - Josh Nelson (2); 2:33 - Kevin Hancock (4); 3:21 - pp - Adam Boqvist (7); 5:52 - pp - William Lochead (2)
Anthony Popovich (21 saves / 26 shots); Nico Daws (8 saves / 10 shots)		Goalie stats	Jordan Kooy (27 saves / 27 shots)

April 8	London Knights	7 – 4	Guelph Storm	Sleeman Centre	Recap
Adam Boqvist (8) - pp - 5:02; Liam Foudy (4) - 9:33; Kevin Hancock (5) - pp - 19:56		First period	9:11 - pp - Dmitri Samorukov (2)
William Lochead (3) - 10:28; Evan Bouchard (3) - 13:38; Matvey Guskov (2) - 17:25		Second period	4:22 - Dmitri Samorukov (3); 13:01 - Markus Phillips (1); 19:44 - Nick Suzuki (5)
Evan Bouchard (4) - 8:11		Third period	No scoring
Jordan Kooy (29 saves / 33 shots)		Goalie stats	Anthony Popovich (15 saves / 22 shots)

April 10	London Knights	3 – 4	Guelph Storm	Sleeman Centre	Recap
Adam Boqvist (9) - pp - 17:32		First period	4:24 - pp - Nate Schnarr (3)
No scoring		Second period	4:58 - Nate Schnarr (4); 5:45 - Nick Suzuki (6)
Billy Moskal (2) - 0:12; Alec Regula (2) - pp - 15:18		Third period	14:34 - Liam Hawel (3)
Jordan Kooy (27 saves / 31 shots)		Goalie stats	Anthony Popovich (39 saves / 42 shots)

April 12	Guelph Storm	3 – 1	London Knights	Budweiser Gardens	Recap
Domenico Commisso (2) - 9:44		First period	19:07 - Alex Formenton (3)
No scoring		Second period	No scoring
Nick Suzuki (7) - 3:59; Nick Suzuki (8) - en - 19:47		Third period	No scoring
Anthony Popovich (35 saves / 36 shots)		Goalie stats	Jordan Kooy (32 saves / 34 shots)

April 13	London Knights	3 – 5	Guelph Storm	Sleeman Centre	Recap
Liam Foudy (5) - 3:30		First period	No scoring
Billy Moskal (3) - 15:20		Second period	7:01 - Isaac Ratcliffe (3); 17:20 - Jack Hanley (1); 19:42 - Sean Durzi (1)
Adam Boqvist (10) - pp - 5:09		Third period	1:50 - Domenico Commisso (3); 18:23 - en - Nick Suzuki (9)
Jordan Kooy (25 saves / 29 shots)		Goalie stats	Anthony Popovich (26 saves / 29 shots)

April 16	Guelph Storm	6 – 3	London Knights	Budweiser Gardens	Recap
Dmitri Samorukov (4) - 16:40		First period	No scoring
Nick Suzuki (10) - pp - 6:59		Second period	0:33 - pp - Alex Formenton (4); 2:23 - Connor McMichael (2); 3:37 - Liam Foudy (6)
Isaac Ratcliffe (4) - 2:49; Isaac Ratcliffe (5) - 3:59; MacKenzie Entwistle (4) - 6:30; MacKenzie Entwistle (5) - en - 15:38		Third period	No scoring
Anthony Popovich (31 saves / 34 shots)		Goalie stats	Jordan Kooy (22 saves / 27 shots)

Guelph wins series 4 – 3

===== (2) Saginaw Spirit vs. (3) Sault Ste. Marie Greyhounds =====
April 5	Sault Ste. Marie Greyhounds	1 – 4	Saginaw Spirit	Dow Event Center	Recap
No scoring		First period	No scoring
Jaden Peca (1) - 16:48		Second period	1:34 - Owen Tippett (6)
No scoring		Third period	8:21 - pp - Bode Wilde (3); 17:54 - en - Owen Tippett (7); 19:00 - en - Damien Giroux (5)
Matt Villalta (29 saves / 31 shots)		Goalie stats	Ivan Prosvetov (34 saves / 35 shots)

April 7	Sault Ste. Marie Greyhounds	1 – 10	Saginaw Spirit	Dow Event Center	Recap
No scoring		First period	5:37 - Nicholas Porco (1); 7:50 - Ryan McLeod (2); 12:17 - Ryan McLeod (3); 13:10 - Camaryn Baber (2); 14:35 - Brady Gilmour (1)
Mac Hollowell (2) - 12:11		Second period	3:46 - Owen Tippett (8); 7:15 - Nicholas Porco (2); 10:42 - pp - Blade Jenkins (3)
No scoring		Third period	2:14 - Blade Jenkins (4); 14:09 - sh - Mason Millman (1)
Matt Villalta (14 saves / 21 shots); Ethan Taylor (18 saves / 21 shots)		Goalie stats	Ivan Prosvetov (42 saves / 43 shots)

April 9	Saginaw Spirit	7 – 5	Sault Ste. Marie Greyhounds	GFL Memorial Gardens	Recap
Cole Coskey (1) - 18:01		First period	1:07 - Morgan Frost (4); 2:15 - Barrett Hayton (5); 8:49 - Jaromír Pytlík (4)
D.J. Busdeker (2) - 2:09; Bode Wilde (4) - 7:57; Brady Gilmour (2) - 8:17; Camaryn Baber (3) - 9:44		Second period	5:23 - Joe Carroll (1); 10:47 - Joe Carroll (2)
Cole Perfetti (3) - pp - 13:54; Owen Tippett (9) - en - 18:13		Third period	No scoring
Ivan Prosvetov (34 saves / 39 shots)		Goalie stats	Matt Villalta (19 saves / 25 shots)

April 11	Saginaw Spirit	0 – 3	Sault Ste. Marie Greyhounds	GFL Memorial Gardens	Recap
No scoring		First period	No scoring
No scoring		Second period	6:17 - Jordan Sambrook (3)
No scoring		Third period	16:22 - pp - Keeghan Howdeshell (6); 17:52 - en - Barrett Hayton (6)
Ivan Prosvetov (26 saves / 28 shots)		Goalie stats	Matt Villalta (25 saves / 25 shots)

April 12	Sault Ste. Marie Greyhounds	6 – 2	Saginaw Spirit	Dow Event Center	Recap
Morgan Frost (5) - 7:05; Jaden Peca (2) - 18:30		First period	No scoring
Morgan Frost (6) - 7:20; Keeghan Howdeshell (7) - pp - 16:58		Second period	14:49 - Albert Michnac (1)
Morgan Frost (7) - 2:11; Jaden Peca (3) - 15:36		Third period	8:27 - Bode Wilde (5)
Matt Villalta (41 saves / 43 shots)		Goalie stats	Ivan Prosvetov (11 saves / 16 shots); Tristan Lennox (5 saves / 6 shots)

April 14	Saginaw Spirit	5 – 0	Sault Ste. Marie Greyhounds	GFL Memorial Gardens	Recap
No scoring		First period	No scoring
Nicholas Porco (3) - 3:00; Ryan McLeod (4) - 16:08		Second period	No scoring
Damien Giroux (6) - 11:28; Bode Wilde (6) - en - 18:25; Jake Goldowski (2) - 18:50		Third period	No scoring
Ivan Prosvetov (34 saves / 34 shots)		Goalie stats	Matt Villalta (21 saves / 25 shots)

Saginaw wins series 4 – 2

=== Conference finals ===
==== Eastern conference finals ====
===== (1) Ottawa 67's vs. (3) Oshawa Generals =====
April 18	Oshawa Generals	4 – 6	Ottawa 67's	TD Place Arena	Recap
Brett Neumann (5) - 12:47		First period	15:47 - Marco Rossi (2); 18:24 - Marco Rossi (3)
Danil Antropov (3) - pp - 12:47; Brandon Saigeon (4) - 18:32; Brandon Saigeon (5) - 19:13		Second period	No scoring
No scoring		Third period	7:34 - Mitchell Hoelscher (5); 14:04 - Sasha Chmelevski (4); 14:53 - pp - Noel Hoefenmayer (6); 19:20 - en - Kody Clark (4)
Kyle Keyser (31 saves / 36 shots)		Goalie stats	Michael DiPietro (16 saves / 20 shots)

April 20	Oshawa Generals	3 – 7	Ottawa 67's	TD Place Arena	Recap
Brandon Saigeon (6) - 0:28; Serron Noel (4) - 18:10		First period	7:03 - Sasha Chmelevski (5); 12:57 - Graeme Clarke (6)
No scoring		Second period	17:14 - pp - Tye Felhaber (7)
Allan McShane (5) - 0:37		Third period	3:11 - pp - Marco Rossi; 7:12 - Mitchell Hoelscher (6); 8:44 - Sasha Chmelevski (6); 11:16 - Kyle Maksimovich (6)
Kyle Keyser (29 saves / 36 shots); Aidan Hughes (6 saves / 6 shots)		Goalie stats	Michael DiPietro (25 saves / 28 shots)

April 21	Ottawa 67's	5 – 1	Oshawa Generals	Tribute Communities Centre	Recap
Tye Felhaber (8) - 10:06; Jack Quinn (3) - sh - 18:53		First period	No scoring
Marco Rossi (5) - pp - 12:59; Lucas Chiodo (7) - 19:31		Second period	10:43 - Nicolas Mattinen (3)
Tye Felhaber (9) - 3:51		Third period	No scoring
Michael DiPietro (28 saves / 29 shots)		Goalie stats	Kyle Keyser (35 saves / 40 shots)

April 24	Ottawa 67's	2 – 1	OT	Oshawa Generals	Tribute Communities Centre	Recap
No scoring		First period		No scoring
No scoring		Second period		1:20 - Ty Tullio (3)
Tye Felhaber (10) - pp - 19:26		Third period		No scoring
Tye Felhaber (11) - pp - 0:20		First overtime period		No scoring
Michael DiPietro (21 saves / 22 shots)		Goalie stats		Kyle Keyser (42 saves / 44 shots)

Ottawa wins series 4 – 0

==== Western conference finals ====
===== (2) Saginaw Spirit vs. (4) Guelph Storm =====
April 18	Guelph Storm	2 – 7	Saginaw Spirit	Dow Event Center	Recap
Isaac Ratcliffe (6) - 0:40		First period	4:35 - Blade Jenkins (5)
Sean Durzi (2) - pp - 8:57		Second period	2:55 - Brady Gilmour (3); 6:20 - Cole Perfetti (4); 12:44 - Cole Coskey (2); 15:31 - Cole Perfetti (5); 19:34 - Cole Coskey (3)
No scoring		Third period	7:28 - Mason Millman (2)
Anthony Popovich (19 saves / 25 shots); Nico Daws (4 saves / 5 shots)		Goalie stats	Ivan Prosvetov (26 saves / 28 shots)

April 20	Guelph Storm	3 – 4	OT	Saginaw Spirit	Dow Event Center	Recap
No scoring		First period		No scoring
Nick Suzuki (11) - 6:54		Second period		4:00 - Damien Giroux (7); 15:08 - Cole Perfetti (6)
Isaac Ratcliffe (7) - pp - 13:26; Markus Phillips (2) - pp - 14:00		Third period		18:43 - pp - Bode Wilde (7)
No scoring		First overtime period		6:52 - Ryan McLeod (5)
Anthony Popovich (30 saves / 34 shots)		Goalie stats		Ivan Prosvetov (31 saves / 34 shots); Tristan Lennox (2 saves / 2 shots)

April 22	Saginaw Spirit	2 – 5	Guelph Storm	Sleeman Centre	Recap
No scoring		First period	15:49 - Zachary Roberts (2)
Owen Tippett (10) - 3:59; Reagan O'Grady (2) - 18:36		Second period	0:54 - Isaac Ratcliffe (8)
No scoring		Third period	2:20 - Cedric Ralph (1); 12:58 - pp - Nate Schnarr (5); 18:02 - en - Keegan Stevenson (1)
Tristan Lennox (41 saves / 45 shots)		Goalie stats	Anthony Popovich (20 saves / 22 shots)

April 24	Saginaw Spirit	4 – 1	Guelph Storm	Sleeman Centre	Recap
Ragan O'Grady (3) - 4:38		First period	No scoring
Owen Tippett (11) - 7:50; Cole Perfetti (7) - pp - 15:05		Second period	No scoring
Cole Perfetti (8) - 11:48		Third period	4:45 - pp - Dmitri Samorukov (5)
Tristan Lennox (36 saves / 37 shots)		Goalie stats	Anthony Popovich (22 saves / 26 shots)

April 26	Guelph Storm	4 – 0	Saginaw Spirit	Dow Event Center	Recap
No scoring		First period	No scoring
Dmitri Samorukov (6) - 5:33; Isaac Ratcliffe (9) - 15:17; Dmitri Samorukov (7) - pp - 17:25		Second period	No scoring
Dmitri Samorukov (8) - 1:44		Third period	No scoring
Anthony Popovich (20 saves / 20 shots)		Goalie stats	Tristan Lennox (39 saves / 43 shots)

April 28	Saginaw Spirit	1 – 5	Guelph Storm	Sleeman Centre	Recap
No scoring		First period	8:34 - Pavel Gogolev (2)
No scoring		Second period	2:28 - Fedor Gordeev (2); 7:52 - Nick Suzuki (12)
Jake Goldowski (3) - 17:28		Third period	0:28 - pp - Sean Durzi (3); 1:46 - Pavel Gogolev (3)
Tristan Lennox (20 saves / 25 shots)		Goalie stats	Anthony Popovich (18 saves / 19 shots)

April 29	Guelph Storm	3 – 2	Saginaw Spirit	Dow Event Center	Recap
Cedric Ralph (2) - 13:10		First period	3:29 - Damien Giroux (8)
Alexey Toropchenko (6) - 4:54		Second period	No scoring
Nick Suzuki (13) - en - 18:40		Third period	18:56 - Damien Giroux (9)
Anthony Popovich (23 saves / 25 shots)		Goalie stats	Tristan Lennox (30 saves / 32 shots)

Guelph wins series 4 – 3

=== OHL Finals ===
==== J. Ross Robertson Cup ====
===== (E1) Ottawa 67's vs. (W4) Guelph Storm =====
May 2	Guelph Storm	2 – 7	Ottawa 67's	TD Place Arena	Recap
No scoring		First period	3:46 - Sasha Chmelevski (7); 18:48 - pp - Tye Felhaber (12)
Isaac Ratcliffe (10) - 1:50; Nick Suzuki (14) - pp - 10:16		Second period	0:54 - Lucas Chiodo (8); 15:24 - Marco Rossi (6)
No scoring		Third period	10:36 - pp - Sasha Chmelevski (8); 11:31 - pp - Noel Hoefenmayer (7); 12:12 - pp - Tye Felhaber (13)
Anthony Popovich (19 saves / 26 shots)		Goalie stats	Michael DiPietro (37 saves / 39 shots)

May 4	Guelph Storm	3 – 4	Ottawa 67's	TD Place Arena	Recap
Alexey Toropchenko (7) - pp - 12:59; Keegan Stevenson (2) - 13:57		First period	19:40 - pp - Austen Keating (2)
No scoring		Second period	1:31 - Kyle Maksimovich (7); 6:43 - Tye Felhaber (14); 12:51 - Sasha Chmelevski (9)
Alexey Toropchenko (8) - 1:15		Third period	No scoring
Anthony Popovich (37 saves / 41 shots)		Goalie stats	Michael DiPietro (7 saves / 9 shots); Cedrick Andree (26 saves / 27 shots)

May 6	Ottawa 67's	2 – 7	Guelph Storm	Sleeman Centre	Recap
Sasha Chmelevski (10) - pp - 5:23		First period	4:08 - Isaac Ratcliffe (11); 11:41 - Alexey Toropchenko (9)
Graeme Clarke (7) - 6:30		Second period	0:59 - Nate Schnarr (6); 16:31 - Alexey Toropchenko (10)
No scoring		Third period	7:49 - MacKenzie Entwistle (6); 14:45 - Isaac Ratcliffe (12); 16:33 - MacKenzie Entwistle (7)
Cedrick Andree (29 saves / 36 shots)		Goalie stats	Anthony Popovich (18 saves / 20 shots)

May 8	Ottawa 67's	4 – 5	Guelph Storm	Sleeman Centre	Recap
Hudson Wilson (1) - 4:48		First period	12:04 - pp - Nate Schnarr (7); 13:29 - Alexey Toropchenko (11)
Lucas Chiodo (9) - 18:22		Second period	6:46 - Alexey Toropchenko (12); 13:34 - Nick Suzuki (15)
Tye Felhaber (15) - pp - 16:05; Kyle Maksimovich (8) - 19:57		Third period	2:28 - pp - Liam Hawel (4)
Cedrick Andree (19 saves / 24 shots)		Goalie stats	Anthony Popovich (30 saves / 34 shots)

May 10	Guelph Storm	4 – 3	Ottawa 67's	TD Place Arena	Recap
Cedric Ralph (3) - 12:44; Isaac Ratcliffe (13) - 12:57		First period	10:40 - Tye Felhaber (16)
Alexey Toropchenko (13) - 3:40; Nate Schnarr (8) - 12:39		Second period	6:33 - Sasha Chmelevski (11)
No scoring		Third period	11:26 - Tye Felhaber (17)
Anthony Popovich (28 saves / 31 shots)		Goalie stats	Cedrick Andree (25 saves / 29 shots)

May 12	Ottawa 67's	3 – 8	Guelph Storm	Sleeman Centre	Recap
Noel Hoefenmayer (8) - 2:59; Kody Clark (5) - pp - 8:30		First period	No scoring
Sasha Chmelevski (12) - pp - 18:52		Second period	0:51 - pp - Dmitri Samorukov (9); 7:46 - Isaac Ratcliffe (14); 14:43 - pp - Isaac Ratcliffe (15); 15:04 - Cedric Ralph (4); 15:57 - Nick Suzuki (16)
No scoring		Third period	10:45 - pp - Dmitri Samorukov (10); 15:35 - en - Domenico Commisso (4); 16:37 - Keegan Stevenson (3)
Cedrick Andree (31 saves / 38 shots)		Goalie stats	Anthony Popovich (23 saves / 26 shots)

Guelph wins series 4 – 2

=== J. Ross Robertson Cup champions roster ===
2018-19 Guelph Storm
Goaltenders: (Canada) 32 – Nico Daws; (Canada) 35 – Anthony Popovich	Defencemen: (Canada) 4 – Owen Lalonde; (Russia) 5 – Dmitri Samorukov; (Canada) 6 – Sean Durzi; (Russia) 11 – Daniil Chayka; (Canada) 22 – Jack Hanley; (Canada) 23 – Zack Terry; (Canada) 25 – Markus Phillips; (Canada) 29 – Fedor Gordeev	Wingers: (Canada) 7 – Zachary Roberts; (Canada) 12 – Keegan Stevenson; (Russia) 13 – Alexey Toropchenko; (Canada) 14 – Cedric Ralph; (Canada) 16 – Nate Schnarr; (Russia) 17 – Pavel Gogolev; (Canada) 19 – Isaac Ratcliffe – C; (Canada) 20 – Ben McFarlane; (Canada) 21 – Ty Collins	Centres: (Canada) 8 – Cam Hillis; (Canada) 9 – Nick Suzuki; (Canada) 10 – MacKenzie Entwistle; (Canada) 15 – Liam Hawel; (Canada) 27 – Domenico Commisso; Coach: (Canada) George Burnett; General Manager: (Canada) George Burnett

=== Playoff scoring leaders ===
Note: GP = Games played; G = Goals; A = Assists; Pts = Points; PIM = Penalty minutes

Player	Team	GP	G	A	Pts	PIM
Nick Suzuki	Guelph Storm	24	16	26	42	16
Sasha Chmelevski	Ottawa 67's	18	12	19	31	10
Isaac Ratcliffe	Guelph Storm	24	15	15	30	20
Lucas Chiodo	Ottawa 67's	18	9	20	29	2
Tye Felhaber	Ottawa 67's	18	17	11	28	12
Dmitri Samorukov	Guelph Storm	24	10	18	28	12
Sean Durzi	Guelph Storm	24	3	24	27	14
Owen Tippett	Saginaw Spirit	17	11	11	22	0
Kyle Maksimovich	Ottawa 67's	16	8	14	22	19
Marco Rossi	Ottawa 67's	17	6	16	22	18

=== Playoff leading goaltenders ===
Note: GP = Games played; Mins = Minutes played; W = Wins; L = Losses: OTL = Overtime losses; SL = Shootout losses; GA = Goals Allowed; SO = Shutouts; GAA = Goals against average

Player	Team	GP	Mins	W	L	GA	SO	Sv%	GAA
Michael DiPietro	Ottawa 67's	14	844	13	0	33	1	0.914	2.35
Stephen Dhillon	Niagara IceDogs	11	660	6	5	26	3	0.910	2.36
Ivan Prosvetov	Saginaw Spirit	12	707	9	2	28	1	0.930	2.38
Jordan Kooy	London Knights	11	655	7	4	29	2	0.903	2.66
Kyle Keyser	Oshawa Generals	15	891	8	7	42	1	0.925	2.83

== Awards ==
Playoffs trophies
Trophy name	Recognition	Recipient
J. Ross Robertson Cup	OHL Finals champion	Guelph Storm
Bobby Orr Trophy	Eastern Conference champion	Ottawa 67's
Wayne Gretzky Trophy	Western Conference champion	Guelph Storm
Wayne Gretzky 99 Award	Playoffs MVP	Nick Suzuki, Guelph Storm
Regular season — Team trophies
Trophy name	Recognition	Recipient
Hamilton Spectator Trophy	Team with best record	Ottawa 67's
Leyden Trophy	East division champion	Ottawa 67's
Emms Trophy	Central division champion	Niagara IceDogs
Bumbacco Trophy	West division champion	Saginaw Spirit
Holody Trophy	Midwest division champion	London Knights
Regular season — Executive awards
Trophy name	Recognition	Recipient
Matt Leyden Trophy	Coach of the year	André Tourigny, Ottawa 67's
Bill Long Award	Lifetime achievement	Larry Mavety, Belleville & Kingston
OHL Executive of the Year	Executive of the Year	–
Regular season — Player awards
Trophy name	Recognition	Recipient
Red Tilson Trophy	Most outstanding player	Ukko-Pekka Luukkonen, Sudbury Wolves
Eddie Powers Memorial Trophy	Top scorer	Jason Robertson, Kingston & Niagara
Dave Pinkney Trophy	Lowest team goals against	Cedrick Andree & Michael DiPietro, Ottawa 67's
Max Kaminsky Trophy	Most outstanding defenceman	Evan Bouchard, London Knights
Jim Mahon Memorial Trophy	Top scoring right winger	Justin Brazeau, North Bay Battalion
Emms Family Award	Rookie of the year	Quinton Byfield, Sudbury Wolves
William Hanley Trophy	Most sportsmanlike player	Nick Suzuki, Owen Sound & Guelph
F. W. "Dinty" Moore Trophy	Best rookie GAA	Ethan Taylor, Sault Ste. Marie Greyhounds
Bobby Smith Trophy	Scholastic player of the year	Thomas Harley, Mississauga Steelheads
Leo Lalonde Memorial Trophy	Overage player of the year	Justin Brazeau, North Bay Battalion
OHL Goaltender of the Year	Goaltender of the year	Ukko-Pekka Luukkonen, Sudbury Wolves
Dan Snyder Memorial Trophy	Humanitarian of the year	Nicholas Canade, Mississauga Steelheads
Roger Neilson Memorial Award	Top academic college/university player	Sasha Chmelevski, Ottawa 67's
Ivan Tennant Memorial Award	Top academic high school player	Mack Guzda, Owen Sound & Zack Terry, Guelph
Mickey Renaud Captain's Trophy	Team captain that best exemplifies character and commitment	Isaac Ratcliffe, Guelph Storm
Prospect player awards
Trophy name	Recognition	Recipient
Jack Ferguson Award	First overall pick in priority selection	Shane Wright, Kingston Frontenacs
Tim Adams Memorial Trophy	OHL Cup MVP	Shane Wright, Don Mills Flyers

== All-Star teams ==
The OHL All-Star Teams were selected by the OHL's General Managers.

=== First team ===
- Morgan Frost, Centre, Sault Ste. Marie Greyhounds
- Jason Robertson, Left Wing, Kingston Frontenacs/Niagara IceDogs
- Justin Brazeau, Right Wing, North Bay Battalion
- Evan Bouchard, Defence, London Knights
- Mac Hollowell, Defence, Sault Ste. Marie Greyhounds
- Ukko-Pekka Luukkonen, Goaltender, Sudbury Wolves
- Andre Tourigny, Coach, Ottawa 67's

=== Second team ===
- Kevin Hancock, Centre, Owen Sound Attack/London Knights
- Arthur Kaliyev, Left Wing, Hamilton Bulldogs
- Tye Felhaber, Right Wing, Ottawa 67's
- Bode Wilde, Defence, Saginaw Spirit
- Adam Boqvist, Defence, London Knights
- Kyle Keyser, Goaltender, Oshawa Generals
- Cory Stillman, Coach, Sudbury Wolves

=== Third team ===
- Nick Suzuki, Centre, Owen Sound Attack/Guelph Storm
- Isaac Ratcliffe, Left Wing, Guelph Storm
- Nate Schnarr, Right Wing, Guelph Storm
- Dmitri Samorukov, Defence, Guelph Storm
- Thomas Harley, Defence, Mississauga Steelheads
- Ivan Prosvetov, Goaltender, Saginaw Spirit
- Dale Hunter, Coach, London Knights

== 2019 OHL Priority Selection ==
On April 6, 2019, the OHL conducted the 2019 Ontario Hockey League Priority Selection. The Kingston Frontenacs held the first overall pick in the draft, and selected Shane Wright from the Don Mills Flyers of the GTHL. Wright was awarded the Jack Ferguson Award, awarded to the top pick in the draft.

Below are the players who were selected in the first round of the 2019 Ontario Hockey League Priority Selection.

#	Player	Nationality	OHL team	Hometown	Minor team
1	Shane Wright (C)	Canada	Kingston Frontenacs	Burlington, Ontario	Don Mills Flyers (GTHL)
2	Brennan Othmann (LW)	Canada	Flint Firebirds	Pickering, Ontario	Don Mills Flyers (GTHL)
3	Connor Lockhart (C)	Canada	Erie Otters	Kanata, Ontario	Kanata Lasers (HEO Midget)
4	Brandt Clarke (D)	Canada	Barrie Colts	Nepean, Ontario	Don Mills Flyers (GTHL)
5	Mason McTavish (C)	Canada	Peterborough Petes	Pembroke, Ontario	Pembroke Lumber Kings (HEO Midget)
6	Wyatt Johnston (C)	Canada	Windsor Spitfires	Toronto, Ontario	Toronto Marlboros (GTHL)
7	Benjamin Gaudreau (G)	Canada	Sarnia Sting	Corbeil, Ontario	North Bay Trappers (NOHA)
8	Ryan Winterton (RW)	Canada	Hamilton Bulldogs	Whitby, Ontario	Whitby Wildcats (OMHA-EHL)
9	Liam Arnsby (C)	Canada	North Bay Battalion	Ajax, Ontario	Don Mills Flyers (GTHL)
10	Deni Goure (C)	Canada	Owen Sound Attack	Grande Pointe, Ontario	Chatham-Kent Cyclones (MHAO)
11	Jon-Randall Avon (C)	Canada	Peterborough Petes	Peterborough, Ontario	Peterborough Minor Petes (OMHA-EHL)
12	Ethan Del Mastro (D)	Canada	Mississauga Steelheads	Freelton, Ontario	Toronto Marlboros (GTHL)
13	Francesco Pinelli (C)	Canada	Kitchener Rangers	Stoney Creek, Ontario	Toronto Red Wings (GTHL)
14	Danny Zhilkin (C)	Canada	Guelph Storm	Mississauga, Ontario	Toronto Marlboros (GTHL)
15	Landon McCallum (C)	Canada	Sudbury Wolves	Simcoe, Ontario	Brantford 99ers (MHAO)
16	Brett Harrison (C)	Canada	Oshawa Generals	Dorchester, Ontario	London Jr. Knights (MHAO)
17	Isaac Enright (D)	Canada	Niagara Ice Dogs	Cobden, Ontario	Pembroke Lumber Kings (HEO Midget)
18	Jacob Holmes (D)	Canada	Sault Ste. Marie Greyhounds	Alliston, Ontario	York-Simcoe Express (OMHA-EHL)
19	Connor Punnett (D)	Canada	Saginaw Spirit	Huntsville, Ontario	North Central Predators (OMHA-EHL)
20	Stuart Rolofs (LW)	Canada	London Knights	Carp, Ontario	Kanata Lasers (HEO Midget)
21	Jack Matier (D)	Canada	Ottawa 67's	Sault Ste. Marie, Ontario	Soo Thunderbirds (NOHA)

== 2019 NHL entry draft ==
On June 21–22, 2019, the National Hockey League conducted the 2019 NHL entry draft held at Rogers Arena in Vancouver, British Columbia. In total, 25 players from the Ontario Hockey League were selected in the draft. Thomas Harley of the Mississauga Steelheads was the first player from the OHL to be selected, as he was taken with the 18th overall pick by the Dallas Stars.

Below are the players selected from OHL teams at the NHL Entry Draft.

Round	#	Player	Nationality	NHL team	Hometown	OHL team
1	18	Thomas Harley (D)	United States	Dallas Stars	Syracuse, New York	Mississauga Steelheads
1	24	Philip Tomasino (RW)	Canada	Nashville Predators	Mississauga, Ontario	Niagara IceDogs
1	25	Connor McMichael (C)	Canada	Washington Capitals	Ajax, Ontario	London Knights
1	28	Ryan Suzuki (C)	Canada	Carolina Hurricanes	London, Ontario	Barrie Colts
2	33	Arthur Kaliyev (LW)	United States	Los Angeles Kings	Staten Island, New York	Hamilton Bulldogs
2	44	Jamieson Rees (C)	Canada	Carolina Hurricanes	Hamilton, Ontario	Sarnia Sting
2	52	Vladislav Kolyachonok (D)	Belarus	Florida Panthers	Minsk, Belarus	Flint Firebirds
2	53	Nick Robertson (LW)	United States	Toronto Maple Leafs	Northville, Michigan	Peterborough Petes
2	59	Hunter Jones (G)	Canada	Minnesota Wild	Brantford, Ontario	Peterborough Petes
2	61	Nikita Okhotiuk (D)	Russia	New Jersey Devils	Chelyabinsk, Russia	Ottawa 67's
3	80	Graeme Clarke (RW)	Canada	New Jersey Devils	Ottawa, Ontario	Ottawa 67's
3	81	Cole Schwindt (RW)	Canada	Florida Panthers	Kitchener, Ontario	Mississauga Steelheads
3	82	Michael Vukojevic (D)	Canada	New Jersey Devils	Oakville, Ontario	Kitchener Rangers
4	103	Mason Millman (D)	Canada	Philadelphia Flyers	London, Ontario	Saginaw Spirit
4	122	Ethan Keppen (LW)	Canada	Vancouver Canucks	Whitby, Ontario	Flint Firebirds
5	126	Jacob LeGuerrier (RW)	Canada	Montreal Canadiens	Gloucester, Ontario	Sault Ste. Marie Greyhounds
5	141	Mason Primeau (C)	Canada	Vegas Golden Knights	Toronto, Ontario	North Bay Battalion
5	142	Nicholas Porco (LW)	Canada	Dallas Stars	Sault Ste. Marie, Ontario	Saginaw Spirit
5	149	Matvey Guskov (LW)	Russia	Minnesota Wild	Nizhnekamsk, Russia	London Knights
5	155	Keean Washkurak (C)	Canada	St. Louis Blues	Waterloo, Ontario	Mississauga Steelheads
6	168	Greg Meireles (C)	Canada	Florida Panthers	Ottawa, Ontario	Kitchener Rangers
6	183	Blake Murray (C)	Canada	Carolina Hurricanes	Uxbridge, Ontario	Sudbury Wolves
6	186	Mathew Hill (D)	Canada	Anaheim Ducks	Oakville, Ontario	Barrie Colts
7	209	Cole Coskey (RW)	United States	New York Islanders	Zion, Illinois	Saginaw Spirit
7	212	Tyler Angle (C)	Canada	Columbus Blue Jackets	Thorold, Ontario	Windsor Spitfires

== 2019 CHL Import Draft ==
On June 27, 2019, the Canadian Hockey League conducted the 2019 CHL Import Draft, in which teams in all three CHL leagues participate in. The Kingston Frontenacs held the first pick in the draft by a team in the OHL, and selected Martin Chromiak from Slovakia with their selection.

Below are the players who were selected in the first round by Ontario Hockey League teams in the 2019 CHL Import Draft.

#	Player	Nationality	OHL team	Hometown	Last team
2	Martin Chromiak (RW)	Slovakia	Kingston Frontenacs	Ilava, Slovakia	Trencin Jr.
5	Yevgeni Oksentyuk (RW)	Belarus	Flint Firebirds	Brest, Belarus	Soligorsk Shakhner
8	Marat Khusnutdinov (C)	Russia	Erie Otters	Moscow, Russia	Podolsk Vityaz U18
11	Arturs Silovs (G)	Latvia	Barrie Colts	Riga, Latvia	Riga SK Riga
14	Ruben Rafkin (D)	Finland	Windsor Spitfires	Turku, Finland	Lincoln Stars
17	Eric Hjorth (D)	Sweden	Sarnia Sting	Linköping, Sweden	Linkoping HC J18E
20	Jan Mysak (C)	Czech Republic	Hamilton Bulldogs	Litvínov, Czech Republic	Litvinov Verva
23	Martin Hugo Has (D)	Czech Republic	North Bay Battalion	Prague, Czech Republic	Tappara Tampere Jr.
26	Stepan Machacek (LW)	Czech Republic	Owen Sound Attack	Nový Jičín, Czech Republic	Trinec HC Zelenzarny Jr.
29	David Maier (D)	Austria	Peterborough Petes	Klagenfurt, Austria	North Bay Battalion
32	Ole Julian Holm (D)	Norway	Mississauga Steelheads	Oslo, Norway	Colorado Thunderbirds 16U
35	Ville Ottavainen (D)	Finland	Kitchener Rangers	Oulu, Finland	Karpat Oulu B
38	Andrei Bakanov (RW)	Russia	Guelph Storm	Moscow, Russia	Cedar Rapids RoughRiders
41	Frederik Nissen Dichow (G)	Denmark	Sudbury Wolves	Vojens, Denmark	Vojens
44	Oliver Suni (RW)	Finland	Oshawa Generals	Kempele, Finland	Karpat Oulu B
47	Giancarlo Chanton (D)	Switzerland	Niagara IceDogs	Langnau im Emmental, Switzerland	Langnau SCL Young Tigers Jr.
50	Nick Malik (G)	Czech Republic	Sault Ste. Marie Greyhounds	Ostrava, Czech Republic	Frydek-Mistek HC
53	Ilya Solovyov (D)	Belarus	Saginaw Spirit	Mogilev, Belarus	Team Belarus U20
56	Kirill Steklov (D)	Russia	London Knights	Tallinn, Estonia	Podolsk Vityaz U17
58	No selection made		Ottawa 67's		

Preceded by 2017–18 OHL season	OHL seasons	Succeeded by 2019–20 OHL season
