= Dmitri Samorukov =

Russian ice hockey player (born 1999)

- Born: 16 June 1999 (age 27) Volgograd, Russia
- Height: 6 ft 3 in (191 cm)
- Weight: 188 lb (85 kg; 13 st 6 lb)
- Position: Defence
- Shoots: Left
- KHL team Former teams: CSKA Moscow; Edmonton Oilers; St. Louis Blues
- NHL draft: 84th overall, 2017; Edmonton Oilers
- Playing career: 2018–present

Dmitri Andreyevich Samorukov (Russian: Дмитрий Андреевич Саморуков; born 16 June 1999) is a Russian professional ice hockey defenseman for HC CSKA Moscow of the Kontinental Hockey League (KHL).

== Playing career ==
Samorukov played major junior hockey in the Ontario Hockey League with the Guelph Storm and was drafted by the Oilers in the 2017 NHL Entry Draft in the third round, 84th overall. He signed an entry-level contract on 7 September 2017. In the 2020–21 season, he played one season in the Kontinental Hockey League (KHL) with CSKA Moscow due to COVID-19-related stoppages in North American hockey, but returned to Bakersfield for the next season.

On 9 October 2022, Samorukov was traded by the Oilers to the St. Louis Blues in exchange for fellow Russian, Klim Kostin. He was assigned to affiliate, the Springfield Thunderbirds of the AHL for the majority of the 2022–23 season, before appearing in two games with St. Louis in a brief recall.

As a pending restricted free agent, Samorukov was not tendered a qualifying offer by the Blues and was released as a free agent. On 31 July 2023, Samorukov opted to continue his career in North America in signing a one-year, AHL contract with the Wilkes-Barre/Scranton Penguins, the affiliate to the Pittsburgh Penguins. Samorukov opened the 2023–24 season in the AHL, posting 5 points through 15 games with Wilkes-Barre/Scranton before he was signed to a one-year, two-way contract with Pittsburgh on 22 November 2023.

On 1 August 2024, Samorukov as a free agent opted to return to his homeland to continue his career, signing a three-year contract with his original club, CSKA Moscow of the KHL.

== Career statistics ==
=== Regular season and playoffs ===
			Regular season					Playoffs
Season	Team	League	GP	G	A	Pts	PIM	GP	G	A	Pts	PIM
2015–16	Krasnaya Armiya	MHL	3	0	1	1	0	—	—	—	—	—
2016–17	Guelph Storm	OHL	67	4	16	20	41	—	—	—	—	—
2017–18	Guelph Storm	OHL	62	11	23	34	29	6	0	2	2	6
2017–18	Bakersfield Condors	AHL	5	0	2	2	2	—	—	—	—	—
2018–19	Guelph Storm	OHL	59	10	35	45	20	24	10	18	28	12
2019–20	Bakersfield Condors	AHL	47	2	8	10	24	—	—	—	—	—
2020–21	CSKA Moscow	KHL	48	2	6	8	12	—	—	—	—	—
2021–22	Bakersfield Condors	AHL	51	3	15	18	44	—	—	—	—	—
2021–22	Edmonton Oilers	NHL	1	0	0	0	0	—	—	—	—	—
2022–23	Springfield Thunderbirds	AHL	69	4	16	20	28	2	0	0	0	0
2022–23	St. Louis Blues	NHL	2	0	0	0	2	—	—	—	—	—
2023–24	Wilkes-Barre/Scranton Penguins	AHL	64	5	10	15	28	1	0	0	0	0
2024–25	CSKA Moscow	KHL	32	1	4	5	24	6	2	0	2	0
2025–26	CSKA Moscow	KHL	48	3	7	10	14	10	0	0	0	6
KHL totals			128	6	17	23	50	16	2	0	2	6
NHL totals			3	0	0	0	2	—	—	—	—	—

Medal record

Representing Russia

Ice hockey

World Junior Championships
Bronze medal – third place	2019 Canada	

=== International ===
Year	Team	Event	Result	GP	G	A	Pts	PIM
2015	Russia	U17	2nd place, silver medalist(s)	6	2	0	2	18
2016	Russia	U18	6th	5	1	4	5	2
2016	Russia	IH18	3rd place, bronze medalist(s)	5	0	2	2	16
2017	Russia	U18	3rd place, bronze medalist(s)	7	1	4	5	6
2018	Russia	WJC	5th	5	0	1	1	4
2019	Russia	WJC	3rd place, bronze medalist(s)	7	1	3	4	2
Junior totals				35	5	14	19	48
