= Justin Brazeau =

Canadian ice hockey player (born 1998)

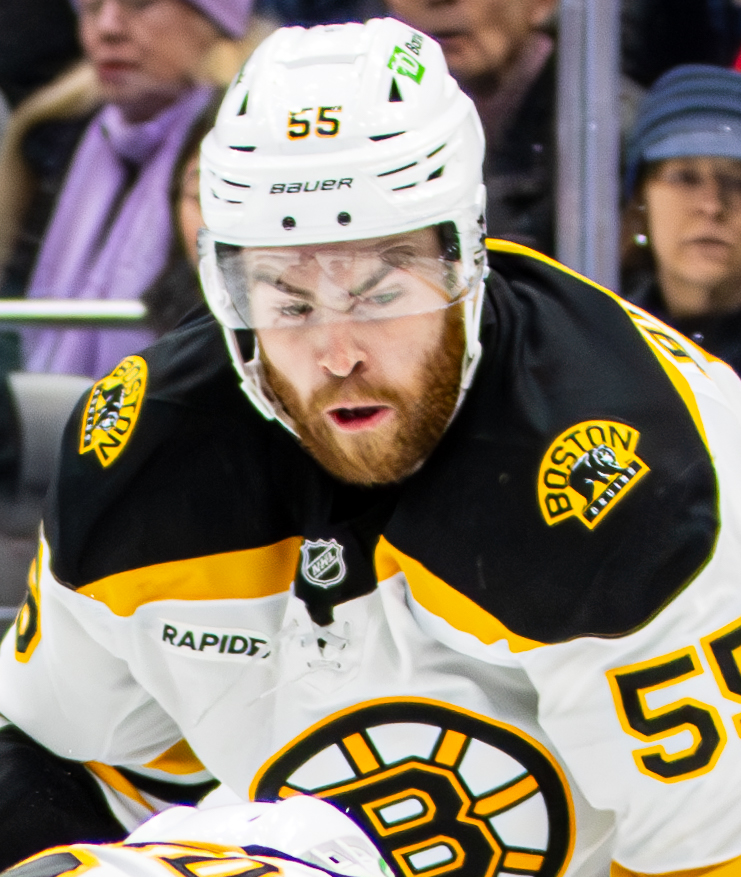
- Brazeau with the Boston Bruins in 2024
- Born: February 2, 1998 (age 28) New Liskeard, Ontario, Canada
- Height: 6 ft 6 in (198 cm)
- Weight: 232 lb (105 kg; 16 st 8 lb)
- Position: Forward
- Shoots: Right
- NHL team Former teams: Pittsburgh Penguins; Boston Bruins; Minnesota Wild
- NHL draft: Undrafted
- Playing career: 2019–present

Justin Brazeau (born February 2, 1998) is a Canadian professional ice hockey player who is a forward for the Pittsburgh Penguins of the National Hockey League (NHL). He previously played for the Boston Bruins and Minnesota Wild.

== Playing career ==
=== Amateur ===
Brazeau played four seasons in the Ontario Hockey League for the North Bay Battalion, serving as a captain in his final season, a season in which he scored 61 goals and 53 assists. Despite this success, Brazeau went undrafted, but was highly touted as an undrafted free agent.

=== Professional ===
==== Toronto Marlies ====
On April 4, 2019, Brazeau signed an AHL contract with the Toronto Marlies. However, he would only play one game for the team in the 2019-20 season, instead playing most of his games with the Newfoundland Growlers of the ECHL. After registering 27 goals and 55 points in 57 games, his season came to an early end on March 12, 2020, as the ECHL season was postponed and later cancelled due to the COVID-19 pandemic. On April 2, 2020, Brazeau was named to the ECHL's All-Rookie team.

Brazeau made the Marlies out of camp for the delayed and shortened 2020–21 season. However, Brazeau had troubled adjusting to the AHL, only scoring four goals for five points in 21 games with the Marlies.

==== Boston Bruins ====
Brazeau signed an AHL contract with the Providence Bruins in 2021.

In his first season in the Boston Bruins organization, Brazeau once again started in the ECHL, being assigned to the Maine Mariners to start the 2021–22 season. However, after finding success with the Mariners, he was called up to Providence after only 18 games, where he would spend the rest of the season and continue his success, scoring 15 goals for 31 points.

Brazeau looked to build off his success in the Bruins organization in 2022–23 season, and made the AHL team to start the season. Brazeau had another strong season and helped the P-Bruins win the Atlantic Division. However, the team would be eliminated by the Hartford Wolf Pack in four games in the opening round of Calder Cup playoffs.

On July 4, 2023, the Providence Bruins announced that they had resigned Brazeau to a one-year AHL contract.

In the midst of his third season with the Providence Bruins, Brazeau signed a two-year, two-way contract with the Boston Bruins on February 19, 2024. He was then called up to make his NHL debut against the Dallas Stars. Brazeau scored his first NHL goal in his NHL debut against the Stars on the same day. Brazeau's story gained attention due to his many years in the minors prior to his call-up and debut. Brazeau's size and play earned him a regular spot in the NHL lineup following his debut. He continued to prove his worth to the Bruins with his first career two-goal effort against the Ottawa Senators on March 19, 2024. Brazeau exited a game against the Nashville Predators with an upper-body injury. The injury would keep Brazeau out the rest of the regular season. Brazeau would not return to the ice for the Bruins until Game 5 of the first round of the 2024 Stanley Cup playoffs against the Toronto Maple Leafs. Brazeau would record his first NHL playoff point with an assist on Hampus Lindholm's game-tying goal in Game 7 of the first round. The Bruins would end up beating the Leafs 2–1 to advance to the second round of the playoffs. Brazeau would score his first career playoff goal in Game 1 of the second round against the Florida Panthers.

Brazeau would make the 2024–25 opening night roster for the Bruins, and would solidify himself as a lineup regular. Brazeau proved himself to be a valuable fourth liner for a struggling Bruins team, recording nine goals and eight assists throughout January. However, the Bruins' struggles, along with an expiring contract, led to speculation that Brazeau's big body and solid production would provide a valuable trade asset to the team.

==== Minnesota Wild ====
On March 6, 2025, Brazeau was traded to the Minnesota Wild, in exchange for Marat Khusnutdinov, Jakub Lauko, and a sixth-round draft pick.

Brazeau would score his first goal as a member of the Wild on March 22, 2025, against the Buffalo Sabres. He would struggle to recreate the same scoring touch he had prior to the trade, managing only a lone goal and assist with the Wild during the regular season. He would score two assists in the Wild first round series against the Vegas Golden Knights, which they lost in six games.

==== Pittsburgh Penguins ====
On July 1, 2025, Brazeau signed a two-year, US$3,000,000 contract with the Pittsburgh Penguins.

Brazeau would start the season on a scoring tear for the Penguins. Throughout the first month of the season, he scored six goals and six assists in 12 games, already closing in on his career high marks. Unfortunately, Brazeau would suffered an injury at the end of the month that would keep him out for the entirety of November. He would return in early December would continue his success, and by the end of the month, Brazeau would have 12 goals and eight assists on the season, already one-upping his career high from the previous season. On December 28, 2025, Brazeau recording his first career hat-trick against the Chicago Blackhawks. Despite putting up career highs during the season, with 17 goals and 17 assists in 64 games, Brazeau found himself to be a healthy scratch at the start of the Penguins first round playoffs series against the Philadelphia Flyers. Brazeau would reenter the lineup in Game 3 of the series, but found himself again a healthy scratch thereafter. The Penguins would lose to the Flyers in six games, ending their season.

== Personal life ==
Brazeau is from New Liskeard, Ontario.

Brazeau's first son was born in October 2025.

== Career statistics ==
Bold indicates led league

			Regular season					Playoffs
Season	Team	League	GP	G	A	Pts	PIM	GP	G	A	Pts	PIM
2015–16	North Bay Battalion	OHL	65	6	7	13	8	11	0	0	0	2
2016–17	North Bay Battalion	OHL	67	22	15	37	10	—	—	—	—	—
2017–18	North Bay Battalion	OHL	68	39	36	75	26	5	5	2	7	2
2018–19	North Bay Battalion	OHL	68	**61**	52	113	40	5	1	0	1	8
2019–20	Toronto Marlies	AHL	1	0	0	0	0	—	—	—	—	—
2019–20	Newfoundland Growlers	ECHL	57	27	28	55	12	—	—	—	—	—
2020–21	Toronto Marlies	AHL	21	4	1	5	6	—	—	—	—	—
2021–22	Providence Bruins	AHL	51	15	16	31	6	2	0	0	0	0
2021–22	Maine Mariners	ECHL	18	10	10	20	4	—	—	—	—	—
2022–23	Providence Bruins	AHL	67	16	29	45	20	4	2	1	3	2
2023–24	Providence Bruins	AHL	49	18	19	37	14	—	—	—	—	—
2023–24	Boston Bruins	NHL	19	5	2	7	2	9	1	1	2	12
2024–25	Boston Bruins	NHL	57	10	10	20	16	—	—	—	—	—
2024–25	Minnesota Wild	NHL	19	1	1	2	2	6	0	2	2	0
2025–26	Pittsburgh Penguins	NHL	64	17	17	34	14	1	0	0	0	0
NHL totals			159	33	30	63	34	16	1	3	4	12

== Awards and honors ==
Award	Year	Ref.
OHL
First Team All-Star	2018–19	
Jim Mahon Memorial Trophy	2018-19	
Leo Lalonde Memorial Trophy	2018-19	
ECHL
All-Rookie Team	2019–20	
All-Star Classic	2022	
