= 2016–17 OJHL season =

- League: Ontario Junior Hockey League
- Sport: Hockey
- Number of teams: 22
- Finals champions: Georgetown Raiders

OJHL seasons
- ← 2015–16 OJHL 2017–18 OJHL →

The 2016–17 season was the 23rd season for the Ontario Junior Hockey League.

== Standings ==
Note: GP = Games played; W = Wins; L = Losses; OTL = Overtime losses; SL = Shootout losses; GF = Goals for; GA = Goals against; PTS = Points; x = clinched playoff berth; y = clinched division title; z = clinched conference title

=== North East Conference ===
North division	GP	W	L	T	OTL	PTS
y-Markham Royals	54	30	20	1	3	64
x-Stouffville Spirit	54	28	20	3	3	62
x-Newmarket Hurricanes	54	22	26	2	4	50
Lindsay Muskies	54	14	36	0	4	32
Aurora Tigers	54	9	39	2	4	24
Pickering Panthers	54	9	42	1	2	21
East division	GP	W	L	T	OTL	PTS
z-Trenton Golden Hawks	54	42	9	2	1	87
x-Cobourg Cougars	54	39	11	0	4	82
x-Whitby Fury	54	38	11	1	4	81
x-Wellington Dukes	54	31	19	1	3	66
x-Kingston Voyageurs	54	28	16	1	3	66

=== South West Conference ===
South division	GP	W	L	T	OTL	PTS
y-Oakville Blades	54	33	14	0	7	73
x-St. Michael's Buzzers	54	28	19	0	7	63
x-Toronto Jr. Canadiens	54	28	20	2	4	62
x-Toronto Patriots	54	29	23	0	2	60
x-North York Rangers	54	26	24	1	3	56
Mississauga Chargers	54	16	34	2	2	36
West division	GP	W	L	T	OTL	PTS
z-Georgetown Raiders	54	45	5	2	2	94
x-Burlington Cougars	54	40	11	3	0	83
x-Buffalo Jr. Sabres	54	23	27	2	2	50
Orangeville Flyers	54	17	33	1	3	38
Milton Icehawks	54	4	48	1	1	10

== Playoffs ==
Conference quarterfinals	Conference semifinals
1	Trenton	4
8	Newmarket	2
1	Trenton	4
7	Stouffville	0
2	Markham	2
7	Stouffville	4
North-East conference
3	Cobourg	4
6	Kingston	0
3	Cobourg	4
5	Wellington	1
4	Whitby	4
5	Wellington	3
Note: Pairings are re-seeded after the first round.
1	Georgetown	4
8	Buffalo	1
1	Georgetown	4
5	Toronto Jr. Canadiens	0
2	Oakville	4
7	North York	1
South-West conference
3	Burlington	4
6	Toronto Patriots	1
2	Oakville	4
3	Burlington	1
4	St. Michael's	3
5	Toronto Jr. Canadiens	4

Conference finals
1	Trenton	4
3	Cobourg	0
1	Georgetown	4
3	Oakville	2

Finals
1	Trenton	3
1	Georgetown	4
