= 2017–18 OHL season =

- League: Ontario Hockey League
- Sport: Hockey
- Duration: Preseason; September 2017; Regular season September 2017 – March 2018; Playoffs; March 2018 – May 2018
- Teams: 20
- TV partner(s): Rogers TV, TVCogeco, Shaw TV

Draft
- Top draft pick: Ryan Suzuki
- Picked by: Barrie Colts

Regular season
- Hamilton Spectator Trophy: Sault Ste. Marie Greyhounds (5)
- Season MVP: Jordan Kyrou (Sarnia Sting)
- Top scorer: Aaron Luchuk (Windsor/Barrie)

Playoffs
- Playoffs MVP: Robert Thomas (Bulldogs)
- Finals champions: Hamilton Bulldogs (1)
- Runners-up: Sault Ste. Marie Greyhounds

OHL seasons
- 2016–17 2018–19

2017–18 CHL season
- League: Canadian Hockey League
- Sport: Hockey
- Duration: OHL; September 2017 – March 2018; QMJHL; September 2017 – March 2018; WHL; September 2017 – March 2018
- Teams: 60
- TV partner(s): TVA Sports; Rogers Sportsnet; Rogers TV; Shaw TV
- Season MVP: Alex Barré-Boulet (Blainville-Boisbriand Armada) (QMJHL)
- Top scorer: Jayden Halbgewachs (Swift Current Broncos) (WHL)

Memorial Cup
- Finals champions: Acadie-Bathurst Titan (QMJHL) (1st title)
- Runners-up: Regina Pats (WHL)

The 2017–18 OHL season was the 38th season of the Ontario Hockey League, in which twenty teams played 68 games each according to the regular season schedule, from September 21, 2017 to March 18, 2018. The Sault Ste. Marie Greyhounds accomplished a streak of 23 consecutive wins between October 27, 2017 and January 4, 2018.

The Hamilton Bulldogs won the J. Ross Robertson Cup as they defeated the Sault Ste. Marie Greyhounds in six games to represent the Ontario Hockey League at the 2018 Memorial Cup, which was hosted by the Regina Pats of the WHL at the Brandt Centre in Regina, Saskatchewan from May 18–27, 2018.

== Regular season ==
=== Final standings ===
Note: DIV = Division; GP = Games played; W = Wins; L = Losses; OTL = Overtime losses; SL = Shootout losses; GF = Goals for; GA = Goals against; PTS = Points; x = clinched playoff berth; y = clinched division title; z = clinched conference title

=== Eastern conference ===
| Rank | Team | DIV | GP | W | L | OTL | SL | PTS | GF | GA |
|---|---|---|---|---|---|---|---|---|---|---|
| 1 | z-Hamilton Bulldogs | East | 68 | 43 | 18 | 4 | 3 | 93 | 252 | 207 |
| 2 | y-Barrie Colts | Central | 68 | 42 | 21 | 4 | 1 | 89 | 297 | 229 |
| 3 | x-Kingston Frontenacs | East | 68 | 36 | 23 | 6 | 3 | 81 | 243 | 202 |
| 4 | x-Niagara IceDogs | Central | 68 | 35 | 23 | 7 | 3 | 80 | 240 | 235 |
| 5 | x-Oshawa Generals | East | 68 | 36 | 29 | 3 | 0 | 75 | 250 | 243 |
| 6 | x-North Bay Battalion | Central | 68 | 30 | 28 | 7 | 3 | 70 | 213 | 237 |
| 7 | x-Mississauga Steelheads | Central | 68 | 33 | 32 | 1 | 2 | 69 | 251 | 250 |
| 8 | x-Ottawa 67's | East | 68 | 30 | 29 | 7 | 2 | 69 | 225 | 260 |
| 9 | Peterborough Petes | East | 68 | 23 | 39 | 3 | 3 | 52 | 222 | 283 |
| 10 | Sudbury Wolves | Central | 68 | 17 | 42 | 9 | 0 | 43 | 197 | 291 |

=== Western conference ===
| Rank | Team | DIV | GP | W | L | OTL | SL | PTS | GF | GA |
|---|---|---|---|---|---|---|---|---|---|---|
| 1 | z-Sault Ste. Marie Greyhounds | West | 68 | 55 | 7 | 3 | 3 | 116 | 317 | 186 |
| 2 | y-Kitchener Rangers | Midwest | 68 | 43 | 21 | 3 | 1 | 90 | 246 | 218 |
| 3 | x-Sarnia Sting | West | 68 | 46 | 17 | 4 | 1 | 97 | 299 | 213 |
| 4 | x-Owen Sound Attack | Midwest | 68 | 38 | 22 | 3 | 5 | 84 | 289 | 247 |
| 5 | x-London Knights | Midwest | 68 | 39 | 25 | 2 | 2 | 82 | 233 | 212 |
| 6 | x-Windsor Spitfires | West | 68 | 32 | 30 | 4 | 2 | 70 | 214 | 224 |
| 7 | x-Guelph Storm | Midwest | 68 | 30 | 29 | 5 | 4 | 69 | 228 | 263 |
| 8 | x-Saginaw Spirit | West | 68 | 29 | 30 | 9 | 0 | 67 | 196 | 238 |
| 9 | Erie Otters | Midwest | 68 | 23 | 35 | 7 | 3 | 56 | 220 | 270 |
| 10 | Flint Firebirds | West | 68 | 20 | 43 | 3 | 2 | 45 | 194 | 316 |

=== Scoring leaders ===
Note: GP = Games played; G = Goals; A = Assists; Pts = Points; PIM = Penalty minutes

| Player | Team | GP | G | A | Pts | PIM |
|---|---|---|---|---|---|---|
| Aaron Luchuk | Windsor/Barrie | 68 | 50 | 65 | 115 | 8 |
| Morgan Frost | Sault Ste. Marie Greyhounds | 67 | 42 | 70 | 112 | 56 |
| Jordan Kyrou | Sarnia Sting | 56 | 39 | 70 | 109 | 22 |
| Nick Suzuki | Owen Sound Attack | 64 | 42 | 58 | 100 | 18 |
| Dmitri Sokolov | Sudbury/Barrie | 64 | 50 | 46 | 96 | 18 |
| Sam Miletic | London/Niagara | 63 | 36 | 56 | 92 | 24 |
| Jason Robertson | Kingston Frontenacs | 68 | 41 | 46 | 87 | 36 |
| Evan Bouchard | London Knights | 67 | 25 | 62 | 87 | 56 |
| Adam Mascherin | Kitchener Rangers | 67 | 40 | 46 | 86 | 20 |
| Boris Katchouk | Sault Ste. Marie Greyhounds | 58 | 42 | 43 | 85 | 30 |
| Linus Nyman | Kingston Frontenacs | 67 | 39 | 46 | 85 | 12 |

=== Leading goaltenders ===
Note: GP = Games played; Mins = Minutes played; W = Wins; L = Losses: OTL = Overtime losses; SL = Shootout losses; GA = Goals Allowed; SO = Shutouts; GAA = Goals against average

| Player | Team | GP | Mins | W | L | OTL | SL | GA | SO | Sv% | GAA |
|---|---|---|---|---|---|---|---|---|---|---|---|
| Matt Villalta | Sault Ste. Marie Greyhounds | 49 | 2904 | 40 | 5 | 2 | 2 | 125 | 3 | 0.908 | 2.58 |
| Jeremy Helvig | Kingston Frontenacs | 56 | 3318 | 31 | 16 | 6 | 3 | 148 | 2 | 0.916 | 2.68 |
| Michael DiPietro | Windsor Spitfires | 56 | 3267 | 29 | 21 | 3 | 1 | 152 | 7 | 0.910 | 2.79 |
| Christian Propp | Barrie/North Bay | 35 | 2052 | 19 | 10 | 3 | 3 | 96 | 1 | 0.910 | 2.81 |
| Joseph Raaymakers | London Knights | 46 | 2623 | 29 | 13 | 1 | 1 | 124 | 3 | 0.910 | 2.84 |

== Playoffs ==
Conference quarterfinals | Conference semifinals
1 | Hamilton | 4
8 | Ottawa | 1
1 | Hamilton | 4
4 | Niagara | 1
4 | Niagara | 4
5 | Oshawa | 1
Eastern Conference
2 | Barrie | 4
7 | Mississauga | 2
2 | Barrie | 2
3 | Kingston | 4
3 | Kingston | 4
6 | North Bay | 1
1 | Sault Ste. Marie | 4
8 | Saginaw | 0
1 | Sault Ste. Marie | 4
4 | Owen Sound | 3
4 | Owen Sound | 4
5 | London | 0
Western Conference
2 | Kitchener | 4
7 | Guelph | 2
2 | Kitchener | 4
3 | Sarnia | 2
3 | Sarnia | 4
6 | Windsor | 2

Conference finals
1 | Hamilton | 4
3 | Kingston | 1
1 | Sault Ste. Marie | 4
2 | Kitchener | 3

Finals
E1 | Hamilton | 4
W1 | Sault Ste. Marie | 2

=== Conference quarterfinals ===
==== Eastern conference quarterfinals ====
===== (1) Hamilton Bulldogs vs. (8) Ottawa 67's =====
| March 22 | Ottawa 67's | 3 – 6 | Hamilton Bulldogs | FirstOntario Centre | Recap |
| Sam Bitten (1) - pp - 13:16 | | First period | 17:45 - pp - Matthew Strome (1) |
| Noel Hoefenmayer (1) - pp - 10:33; Noel Hoefenmayer (2) - 16:06 | | Second period | 1:29 - Benjamin Gleason (1); 15:02 - Robert Thomas (1); 16:49 - Brandon Saigeon (1) |
| No scoring | | Third period | 8:16 - pp - Brandon Saigeon (2); 19:33 - en - Robert Thomas (2) |
| Olivier Tremblay (19 saves / 24 shots) | | Goalie stats | Kaden Fulcher (20 saves / 23 shots) |

| March 25 | Ottawa 67's | 5 – 4 | Hamilton Bulldogs | FirstOntario Centre | Recap |
| No scoring | | First period | 1:03 - William Bitten (1) |
| Shaw Boomhower (1) - 9:28 | | Second period | No scoring |
| Shaw Boomhower (2) - 3:58; Sasha Chmelevski (1) - 10:44; Travis Barron (1) - 12:22; Sam Bitten (2) - pp - 17:59 | | Third period | 4:48 - Justin Lemcke (1); 13:36 - Riley Stillman (1); 16:56 - pp - Brandon Saigeon (3) |
| Olivier Tremblay (31 saves / 35 shots) | | Goalie stats | Kaden Fulcher (25 saves / 30 shots) |

| March 27 | Hamilton Bulldogs | 8 – 1 | Ottawa 67's | TD Place Arena | Recap |
| William Bitten (2) - 14:35 | | First period | No scoring |
| Nick Caamano (1) - pp - 4:11; Isaac Nurse (1) - 5:20; Brandon Saigeon (4) - pp - 6:28; Ryan Moore (1) - pp - 11:05 | | Second period | 5:34 - Mitchell Hoelscher (1) |
| Brandon Saigeon (5) - 0:10; Riley Stillman (2) - 2:03; Arthur Kaliyev (1) - 6:28 | | Third period | No scoring |
| Kaden Fulcher (23 saves / 24 shots) | | Goalie stats | Olivier Tremblay (22 saves / 29 shots); Cedrick Andree (8 saves / 9 shots) |

| March 28 | Hamilton Bulldogs | 5 – 2 | Ottawa 67's | TD Place Arena | Recap |
| Robert Thomas (3) - 14:35; Brandon Saigeon (6) - 17:55 | | First period | 11:49 - pp - Sam Bitten (3) |
| Robert Thomas (4) - 6:34; Nicolas Mattinen (1) - 7:02 | | Second period | 10:28 - Tye Felhaber (1) |
| Ryan Moore (2) - 13:25 | | Third period | No scoring |
| Kaden Fulcher (27 saves / 29 shots) | | Goalie stats | Olivier Tremblay (7 saves / 11 shots); Cedrick Andree (20 saves / 21 shots) |

| March 30 | Ottawa 67's | 1 – 4 | Hamilton Bulldogs | FirstOntario Centre | Recap |
| No scoring | | First period | 4:48 - Matthew Strome (2); 12:19 - pp - Nick Caamano (2) |
| Tye Felhaber (2) - 10:55 | | Second period | 12:44 - pp - Brandon Saigeon (7) |
| No scoring | | Third period | 17:54 - en - Isaac Nurse (2) |
| Olivier Tremblay (24 saves / 27 shots) | | Goalie stats | Kaden Fulcher (24 saves / 25 shots) |

| Hamilton wins series 4 – 1 |

===== (2) Barrie Colts vs. (7) Mississauga Steelheads =====
| March 22 | Mississauga Steelheads | 6 – 2 | Barrie Colts | Barrie Molson Centre | Recap |
| Trent Fox (1) - pp - 18:05 | | First period | 7:32 - Aaron Luchuk (1) |
| Ryan McLeod (1) - sh - 8:26; Owen Tippett (1) - 19:28; Michael McLeod (1) - 19:58 | | Second period | 13:13 - pp - Lucas Chiodo (1) |
| Trent Fox (2) - pp - 6:15; Owen Tippett (2) - 7:24 | | Third period | No scoring |
| Jacob Ingham (32 saves / 34 shots) | | Goalie stats | Leo Lazarev (32 saves / 38 shots) |

| March 26 | Mississauga Steelheads | 3 – 5 | Barrie Colts | Barrie Molson Centre | Recap |
| Keean Washkurak (1) - 15:55 | | First period | 2:08 - Lucas Chiodo (2) |
| Ryan McLeod (2) - 4:06; Owen Tippett (1) - 19:28; Michael McLeod (1) - 19:58 | | Second period | No scoring |
| Adam Varga (1) - 18:22 | | Third period | 5:45 - Aaron Luchuk (2); 9:43 - pp - Dmitry Sokolov (1); 11:51 - Lucas Chiodo (3); 17:28 - en - sh - Zachary Magwood (1) |
| Jacob Ingham (22 saves / 26 shots) | | Goalie stats | Leo Lazarev (38 saves / 41 shots) |

| March 27 | Barrie Colts | 1 – 2 | Mississauga Steelheads | Hershey Centre | Recap |
| No scoring | | First period | No scoring |
| Dmitry Sokolov (2) - 8:47 | | Second period | 15:51 - Michael McLeod (2) |
| No scoring | | Third period | 3:06 - Owen Tippett (3) |
| Leo Lazarev (32 saves / 34 shots) | | Goalie stats | Jacob Ingham (24 saves / 25 shots) |

| March 29 | Barrie Colts | 5 – 4 | OT | Mississauga Steelheads | Hershey Centre | Recap |
| Zachary Magwood (2) - 15:33 | | First period | | No scoring |
| Zachary Magwood (3) - pp - 12:35; Tyler Tucker (1) - 16:55 | | Second period | | 11:59 - sh - Michael McLeod (3); 18:57 - Cole Carter (1) |
| Jaden Peca (1) - 15:17 | | Third period | | 6:39 - Michael McLeod (4); 19:04 - pp - Cole Carter (2) |
| Tyler Tucker (2) - 0:16 | | First overtime period | | No scoring |
| Leo Lazarev (45 saves / 49 shots) | | Goalie stats | | Jacob Ingham (24 saves / 29 shots) |

| March 31 | Mississauga Steelheads | 2 – 5 | Barrie Colts | Barrie Molson Centre | Recap |
| No scoring | | First period | No scoring |
| Mathieu Foget (1) - 13:17 | | Second period | 2:35 - Justin Murray (1); 18:21 - Lucas Chiodo (4) |
| Michael McLeod (5) - 10:01 | | Third period | 14:10 - Tyler Tucker (3); 17:54 - pp - Dmitry Sokolov (3); 19:26 - pp - Jason Willms (1) |
| Emanuel Vella (30 saves / 35 shots) | | Goalie stats | Leo Lazarev (46 saves / 48 shots) |

| April 1 | Barrie Colts | 8 – 2 | Mississauga Steelheads | Hershey Centre | Recap |
| No scoring | | First period | 15:38 - Michael McLeod (6) |
| Aaron Luchuk (3) - 11:08; Zachary Magwood (4) - 11:15; Zachary Magwood (5) - 13:55 | | Second period | 2:52 - Cole Carter (3) |
| Andrei Svechnikov (1) - 3:20; Andrei Svechnikov (2) - sh - 10:07; Dmitry Sokolov (4) - pp - 10:59; Dmitry Sokolov (5) - pp - 15:28; Luke Bignell (1) - 15:51 | | Third period | No scoring |
| Leo Lazarev (40 saves / 42 shots) | | Goalie stats | Jacob Ingham (32 saves / 40 shots) |

| Barrie wins series 4 – 2 |

===== (3) Kingston Frontenacs vs. (6) North Bay Battalion =====
| March 23 | North Bay Battalion | 5 – 2 | Kingston Frontenacs | Rogers K-Rock Centre | Recap |
| Luke Burghardt (1) - 8:48 | | First period | 16:22 - pp - Jason Robertson (1) |
| Luke Burghardt (2) - 0:26; Nick King (1) - pp - 13:32 | | Second period | No scoring |
| Jake Henderson (1) - 15:58; Justin Brazeau (1) - en - 18:13 | | Third period | 6:37 - Eemeli Rasanen (1) |
| Christian Propp (32 saves / 34 shots) | | Goalie stats | Jeremy Helvig (40 saves / 44 shots) |

| March 25 | North Bay Battalion | 3 – 4 | Kingston Frontenacs | Rogers K-Rock Centre | Recap |
| Kyle Potts (1) - 19:59 | | First period | 9:32 - pp - Linus Nyman (1); 17:52 - Linus Nyman (2) |
| Brandon Coe (1) - 19:08 | | Second period | 9:28 - pp - Brett Neumann (1) |
| Brad Chenier (1) - pp - 7:07 | | Third period | 8:47 - Jacob Paquette (1) |
| Christian Propp (27 saves / 31 shots) | | Goalie stats | Jeremy Helvig (26 saves / 29 shots) |

| March 27* | Kingston Frontenacs | 4 – 1 | North Bay Battalion | North Bay Memorial Gardens | Recap |
| No scoring | | First period | No scoring |
| Jason Robertson (2) - pp - 1:53; Gabriel Vilardi (1) - pp - 3:04; Gabriel Vilardi (2) - 19:19 | | Second period | No scoring |
| Jason Robertson (3) - 3:43 | | Third period | 0:58 - Jake Henderson (2) |
| Jeremy Helvig (31 saves / 32 shots) | | Goalie stats | Christian Propp (27 saves / 31 shots) |

| March 29 | Kingston Frontenacs | 6 – 3 | North Bay Battalion | North Bay Memorial Gardens | Recap |
| No scoring | | First period | No scoring |
| Ryan Cranford (1) - 0:14; Cliff Pu (1) - 4:03; Cliff Pu (2) - 8:28 | | Second period | 5:55 - Kyle Potts (2); 13:34 - Matthew Struthers (1) |
| Ryan Cranford (2) - 9:24; Gabriel Vilardi (3) - 13:48; Linus Nyman (3) - en - 18:52 | | Third period | 10:27 - Luke Burghardt (3) |
| Jeremy Helvig (28 saves / 31 shots) | | Goalie stats | Christian Propp (22 saves / 27 shots) |

| March 31 | North Bay Battalion | 5 – 6 | 3OT | Kingston Frontenacs | Rogers K-Rock Centre | Recap |
| Rhys Forhan (1) - 15:18; Justin Brazeau (2) - 15:45; Justin Brazeau (3) - sh - 17:50 | | First period | | 1:44 - pp - Gabriel Vilardi (4); 8:23 - Ted Nichol (1) |
| Justin Brazeau (4) - 3:45 | | Second period | | No scoring |
| Justin Brazeau (5) - 16:39 | | Third period | | 9:56 - Sean Day (1); 12:24 - pp - Jason Robertson (4); 19:40 - Sean Day (2) |
| No scoring | | Third overtime period | | 14:05 - Gabriel Vilardi (5) |
| Christian Propp (71 saves / 77 shots) | | Goalie stats | | Jeremy Helvig (46 saves / 51 shots) |

| Kingston wins series 4 – 1 |

*Note: Game 3 has been moved to Sudbury Community Arena, because the North Bay Memorial Gardens hasn't been ready in time after hosting the 2018 Ford World Women's Curling Championship.

===== (4) Niagara IceDogs vs. (5) Oshawa Generals =====
| March 23 | Oshawa Generals | 2 – 4 | Niagara IceDogs | Meridian Centre | Recap |
| No scoring | | First period | 9:31 - Drew Hunter (1) |
| Jack Studnicka (1) - sh - 17:18 | | Second period | 5:26 - Sam Miletic (1) |
| Matt Brassard (1) - pp - 16:59 | | Third period | 11:13 - Akil Thomas (1); 12:17 - Ben Jones (1) |
| Kyle Keyser (32 saves / 36 shots) | | Goalie stats | Stephen Dhillon (34 saves / 36 shots) |

| March 25 | Oshawa Generals | 1 – 6 | Niagara IceDogs | Meridian Centre | Recap |
| Allan McShane (1) - pp - 5:03 | | First period | 18:39 - pp - Liam Ham (1) |
| No scoring | | Second period | 8:24 - Adrian Carbonara (1) |
| No scoring | | Third period | 3:39 - pp - Sam Miletic (2); 4:10 - Bradey Johnson (1); 12:46 - pp - Akil Thomas (2); 14:25 - pp - Sam Miletic (3) |
| Kyle Keyser (26 saves / 32 shots) | | Goalie stats | Stephen Dhillon (34 saves / 35 shots) |

| March 27 | Niagara IceDogs | 2 – 6 | Oshawa Generals | Tribute Communities Centre | Recap |
| Akil Thomas (3) - 19:00 | | First period | No scoring |
| No scoring | | Second period | 1:15 - Alex Di Carlo (1); 9:46 - pp - Danil Antropov (1); 16:19 - Kyle MacLean (1) |
| Danial Singer (1) - 11:09 | | Third period | 12:16 - Renārs Krastenbergs (1); 16:06 - Kyle MacLean (2); 17:03 - en - sh - Alex Di Carlo (2) |
| Stephen Dhillon (32 saves / 37 shots) | | Goalie stats | Kyle Keyser (39 saves / 41 shots) |

| March 29 | Niagara IceDogs | 5 – 2 | Oshawa Generals | Tribute Communities Centre | Recap |
| Drew Hunter (2) - 7:21 | | First period | 6:17 - Brendan Harrogate (1); 17:48 - Domenico Commisso (1) |
| Bradey Johnson (2) - 2:33; Matthew Philip (1) - 11:51; Justin MacPherson (1) - 17:38 | | Second period | No scoring |
| Matthew Philip (2) - en - 18:06 | | Third period | No scoring |
| Stephen Dhillon (33 saves / 35 shots) | | Goalie stats | Kyle Keyser (31 saves / 35 shots) |

| March 31 | Oshawa Generals | 2 – 5 | Niagara IceDogs | Meridian Centre | Recap |
| No scoring | | First period | No scoring |
| Kyle MacLean (3) - 15:11 | | Second period | 4:12 - William Lochead (1); 8:37 - pp - Kirill Maksimov (1); 16:57 - pp - Oliver Castleman (1) |
| Kenny Huether (1) - 5:01 | | Third period | 9:37 - Akil Thomas (4); 11:21 - pp - Kirill Maksimov (2) |
| Kyle Keyser (22 saves / 27 shots) | | Goalie stats | Stephen Dhillon (31 saves / 33 shots) |

| Niagara wins series 4 – 1 |

==== Western conference quarterfinals ====
===== (1) Sault Ste. Marie Greyhounds vs. (8) Saginaw Spirit =====
| March 23 | Saginaw Spirit | 2 – 5 | Sault Ste. Marie Greyhounds | Essar Centre | Recap |
| No scoring | | First period | 2:53 - Jack Kopacka (1) |
| Cole Coskey (1) - 6:14 | | Second period | 15:57 - Taylor Raddysh (1); 19:07 - Taylor Raddysh (2) |
| Danny Katic (1) - 16:50 | | Third period | 7:14 - Mac Hollowell (1); 12:20 - pp - Keeghan Howdeshell (1) |
| Evan Cormier (34 saves / 39 shots) | | Goalie stats | Matt Villalta (19 saves / 21 shots) |

| March 25 | Saginaw Spirit | 0 – 8 | Sault Ste. Marie Greyhounds | Essar Centre | Recap |
| No scoring | | First period | 4:41 - Morgan Frost (1); 6:30 - pp - Morgan Frost (2); 7:28 - pp - Jack Kopacka (2); 19:35 - pp - Boris Katchouk (1) |
| No scoring | | Second period | 10:52 - Jack Kopacka (3) |
| No scoring | | Third period | 0:13 - pp - Conor Timmins (1); 10:49 - Keeghan Howdeshell (2); 11:45 - Barrett Hayton (1) |
| Evan Cormier (36 saves / 44 shots) | | Goalie stats | Matt Villalta (21 saves / 21 shots) |

| March 26 | Sault Ste. Marie Greyhounds | 7 – 3 | Saginaw Spirit | Dow Event Center | Recap |
| Taylor Raddysh (3) - pp - 10:25 | | First period | 8:28 - pp - Max Grondin (1) |
| Boris Katchouk (2) - 9:41 | | Second period | 14:56 - Mason Kohn (1) |
| Boris Katchouk (3) - 6:29; Hayden Verbeek (1) - 6:42; Rasmus Sandin (1) - pp - 13:10; Jack Kopacka (4) - 15:01; Taylor Raddysh (4) - pp - 17:40 | | Third period | 17:04 - Nicholas Porco (1) |
| Matt Villalta (23 saves / 26 shots) | | Goalie stats | Evan Cormier (29 saves / 36 shots) |

| March 28 | Sault Ste. Marie Greyhounds | 5 – 3 | Saginaw Spirit | Dow Event Center | Recap |
| No scoring | | First period | 0:40 - Cole Coskey (2) |
| Boris Katchouk (4) - 5:24; Tim Gettinger (1) - 7:06; Boris Katchouk (5) - pp - 17:41 | | Second period | No scoring |
| Conor Timmins (2) - pp - 0:55; Boris Katchouk (6) - en - 18:49 | | Third period | 2:25 - D.J. Busdeker (1); 16:19 - D.J. Busdeker (2) |
| Matt Villalta (15 saves / 18 shots) | | Goalie stats | Evan Cormier (23 saves / 27 shots) |

| Sault Ste. Marie wins series 4 – 0 |

===== (2) Kitchener Rangers vs. (7) Guelph Storm =====
| March 23 | Guelph Storm | 2 – 7 | Kitchener Rangers | Kitchener Memorial Auditorium | Recap |
| No scoring | | First period | 8:57 - Jack York (1); 11:38 - Adam Mascherin (1); 13:11 - Greg Meireles (1); 14:22 - pp - Joseph Garreffa (1); 18:19 Riley Damiani (1) |
| Nate Schnarr (1) - 18:02 | | Second period | 18:39 - Kole Sherwood (1) |
| Isaac Ratcliffe (1) - pp - 6:10 | | Third period | 9:46 - Michael Vukojevic (1) |
| Anthony Popovich (24 saves / 30 shots); Nico Daws (12 saves / 13 shots) | | Goalie stats | Mario Culina (36 saves / 38 shots) |

| March 25 | Guelph Storm | 1 – 2 | Kitchener Rangers | Kitchener Memorial Auditorium | Recap |
| Cam Hillis (1) - 1:49 | | First period | 10:07 - pp - Givani Smith (1) |
| No scoring | | Second period | No scoring |
| No scoring | | Third period | 12:34 - Kole Sherwood (2) |
| Anthony Popovich (30 saves / 32 shots) | | Goalie stats | Mario Culina (41 saves / 42 shots) |

| March 27 | Kitchener Rangers | 5 – 7 | Guelph Storm | Sleeman Centre | Recap |
| Logan Stanley (1) - 3:08; Kole Sherwood (3) - 13:01; Givani Smith (2) - 16:50 | | First period | 5:20 - pp - Garrett McFadden (1); 10:26 - Barret Kirwin (1) |
| Riley Damiani (2) - 10:09 | | Second period | 9:29 - Liam Hawel (1); 19:11 - pp - Nate Schnarr (2) |
| Kole Sherwood (4) - 1:58 | | Third period | 17:51 - pp - Alexey Toropchenko (1); 18:15 - Zach Poirier (1); 19:09 - en - Cedric Ralph (1) |
| Mario Culina (20 saves / 26 shots) | | Goalie stats | Anthony Popovich (30 saves / 35 shots) |

| March 28 | Kitchener Rangers | 4 – 6 | Guelph Storm | Sleeman Centre | Recap |
| Joseph Garreffa (2) - pp - 11:17; Givani Smith (3) - 13:25 | | First period | 6:03 - Isaac Ratcliffe (2) |
| No scoring | | Second period | 1:35 - Liam Hawel (2); 5:10 - Isaac Ratcliffe (3); 11:20 Keegan Stevenson (1); 14:11 - Garrett McFadden (2) |
| Kole Sherwood (5) - 5:46; Joseph Garreffa (3) - 8:01 | | Third period | 18:58 - en - Liam Hawel (3) |
| Mario Culina (9 saves / 13 shots); Luke Richardson (5 saves / 6 shots) | | Goalie stats | Anthony Popovich (39 saves / 43 shots) |

| March 30 | Guelph Storm | 2 – 10 | Kitchener Rangers | Kitchener Memorial Auditorium | Recap |
| No scoring | | First period | 6:01 - Kole Sherwood (6); 7:29 - Connor Bunnaman (1); 17:33 - Adam Mascherin (2) |
| Zach Poirier (2) - 13:18 | | Second period | 9:45 - pp - Kole Sherwood (7); 18:36 - Connor Bunnaman (2); 19:58 - Jonathan Yantsis (1) |
| Isaac Ratcliffe (4) - pp - 7:22 | | Third period | 13:46 - Joseph Garreffa (4); 15:42 - pp - Adam Mascherin (3); 18:52 - Jonathan Yantsis (2) |
| Anthony Popovich (32 saves / 39 shots); Nico Daws (7 saves / 10 shots) | | Goalie stats | Mario Culina (32 saves / 34 shots) |

| April 1 | Kitchener Rangers | 5 – 2 | Guelph Storm | Sleeman Centre | Recap |
| Logan Brown (1) - 6:48 | | First period | 7:34 - pp - Ryan Merkley (1) |
| Givani Smith (4) - 0:14; Logan Brown (2) - 8:53; Riley Damiani (3) - 9:31 | | Second period | 19:35 - Isaac Ratcliffe (5) |
| Joseph Garreffa (5) - 17:30 | | Third period | No scoring |
| Mario Culina (29 saves / 31 shots) | | Goalie stats | Anthony Popovich (27 saves / 32 shots) |

| Kitchener wins series 4 – 2 |

===== (3) Sarnia Sting vs. (6) Windsor Spitfires =====
| March 23 | Windsor Spitfires | 6 – 2 | Sarnia Sting | Progressive Auto Sales Arena | Recap |
| No scoring | | First period | No scoring |
| William Sirman (1) - 4:35; Cole Purboo (1) - 7:50; Igor Larionov (1) - pp - 17:02 | | Second period | 10:29 - Drake Rymsha (1) |
| Zach Shankar (1) - 3:34; Cole Purboo (2) - en - 19:07; Jake Smith (1) - 19:29 | | Third period | 15:36 - Anthony Salinitri (1) |
| Michael DiPietro (43 saves / 45 shots) | | Goalie stats | Justin Fazio (24 saves / 29 shots) |

| March 24 | Windsor Spitfires | 1 – 4 | Sarnia Sting | Progressive Auto Sales Arena | Recap |
| Cole Purboo (3) - 16:24 | | First period | No scoring |
| No scoring | | Second period | 14:56 - Sean Josling (1); 17:09 - Hugo Leufvenius (1) |
| No scoring | | Third period | 18:11 - en - Jordan Kyrou (1); 18:31 - en - Hugo Leufvenius (2) |
| Michael DiPietro (48 saves / 50 shots) | | Goalie stats | Justin Fazio (21 saves / 22 shots) |

| March 27 | Sarnia Sting | 5 – 3 | Windsor Spitfires | WFCU Centre | Recap |
| No scoring | | First period | No scoring |
| Drake Rymsha (2) - 0:53; Theo Calvas (1) - sh - 9:34 | | Second period | 1:26 - Daniel D'Amico (1); 1:50 - Cole Purboo (4); 12:24 - Connor Corcoran (1) |
| Hugh Leufvenius (3) - 16:00; Jordan Ernst (1) - 17:27; Sean Josling (2) - en - 19:40 | | Third period | No scoring |
| Justin Fazio (14 saves / 17 shots) | | Goalie stats | Michael DiPietro (33 saves / 37 shots) |

| March 29 | Sarnia Sting | 1 – 3 | Windsor Spitfires | WFCU Centre | Recap |
| Ryan McGregor (1) - 14:22 | | First period | 3:00 - Luke Boka (1) |
| No scoring | | Second period | No scoring |
| No scoring | | Third period | 3:59 - sh - Chris Playfair (1); 13:23 - Curtis Douglas (1) |
| Justin Fazio (19 saves / 22 shots) | | Goalie stats | Michael DiPietro (46 saves / 47 shots) |

| March 30 | Windsor Spitfires | 2 – 4 | Sarnia Sting | Progressive Auto Sales Arena | Recap |
| Tyler Angle (1) - 4:07 | | First period | 13:13 - Cam Dineen (1) |
| No scoring | | Second period | 4:46 - sh - Sean Josling (3) |
| Jake Smith (2) - 4:48 | | Third period | 4:29 - Michael Pezzetta (1); 19:18 - en - Hugo Leufvenius (4) |
| Michael DiPietro (28 saves / 31 shots); Brock Baier (11 saves / 11 shots) | | Goalie stats | Justin Fazio (23 saves / 25 shots) |

| April 1 | Sarnia Sting | 5 – 2 | Windsor Spitfires | WFCU Centre | Recap |
| Ryan McGregor (2) - 4:03; Franco Sproviero (1) - 5:48 | | First period | No scoring |
| Jonathan Ang (1) - 7:41 | | Second period | 11:39 - William Sirman (2) |
| Jordan Ernst (2) - 10:19; Hugo Leufvenius (5) - en - 19:31 | | Third period | 5:16 - Zach Shankar (2) |
| Justin Fazio (18 saves / 20 shots) | | Goalie stats | Michael DiPietro (28 saves / 32 shots) |

| Sarnia wins series 4 – 2 |

===== (4) Owen Sound Attack vs. (5) London Knights =====
| March 22 | London Knights | 4 – 5 | Owen Sound Attack | Harry Lumley Bayshore Community Centre | Recap |
| Richard Whittaker (1) - 2:24; Alex Formenton (1) - pp - 8:55 | | First period | 4:01 - pp - Alan Lyszczarczyk (1); 7:31 - pp- Kevin Hancock (1); 17:21 - Alan Lyszczarczyk (2) |
| Jacob Golden (1) - 4:18; Alex Formenton (2) - pp - 7:30 | | Second period | 2:55 - Nick Suzuki (1) |
| No scoring | | Third period | 2:54 - Maksim Sushko (1) |
| Joseph Raaymakers (38 saves / 43 shots) | | Goalie stats | Olivier Lafrenière (22 saves / 26 shots) |

| March 24 | London Knights | 3 – 4 | OT | Owen Sound Attack | Harry Lumley Bayshore Community Centre | Recap |
| Alex Formenton (3) - pp - 5:30; Alex Formenton (4) - 8:55 | | First period | | 6:47 - Aidan Dudas (1); 10:34 - pp - Brett McKenzie (1) |
| Alex Formenton (5) - sh - 1:03 | | Second period | | No scoring |
| No scoring | | Third period | | 19:11 - Alan Lyszczarczyk (3) |
| No scoring | | First overtime period | | 4:43 - pp - Brett McKenzie (2) |
| Joseph Raaymakers (43 saves / 47 shots) | | Goalie stats | | Olivier Lafrenière (18 saves / 21 shots) |

| March 26 | Owen Sound Attack | 4 – 3 | OT | London Knights | Budweiser Gardens | Recap |
| Brett McKenzie (3) - 3:54 | | First period | | No scoring |
| Brett McKenzie (4) - 5:08; Sean Durzi (1) - 8:36 | | Second period | | 2:30 - Sergey Popov (1); 10:30 - pp - Tyler Rollo (1) |
| No scoring | | Third period | | 15:01 - pp - Evan Bouchard (1) |
| Alan Lyszczarczyk (4) - 0:33 | | First overtime period | | No scoring |
| Olivier Lafrenière (23 saves / 26 shots) | | Goalie stats | | Joseph Raaymakers (38 saves / 42 shots) |

| March 29 | Owen Sound Attack | 2 – 1 | London Knights | Budweiser Gardens | Recap |
| Kevin Hancock (2) - sh - 12:52 | | First period | No scoring |
| Kevin Hancock (3) - pp - 15:19 | | Second period | No scoring |
| No scoring | | Third period | 10:20 - Liam Foudy (1) |
| Olivier Lafrenière (21 saves / 22 shots) | | Goalie stats | Joseph Raaymakers (38 saves / 40 shots) |

| Owen Sound wins series 4 – 0 |

=== Conference semifinals ===
==== Eastern conference semifinals ====
===== (1) Hamilton Bulldogs vs. (4) Niagara IceDogs =====
| April 5 | Niagara IceDogs | 4 – 5 | OT | Hamilton Bulldogs | FirstOntario Centre | Recap |
| No scoring | | First period | | 17:19 - Isaac Nurse (3) |
| Ben Jones (2) - pp - 16:58 | | Second period | | 7:50 - Nick Caamano (3); 9:02 - pp - Robert Thomas (4); 14:05 - Ryan Moore (3) |
| Danial Singer (2) - 0:54; Andrew Bruder (1) - 7:11; Ben Jones (3) - pp - 12:46 | | Third period | | No scoring |
| No scoring | | First overtime period | | 6:32 - Isaac Nurse (4) |
| Stephen Dhillon (42 saves / 47 shots) | | Goalie stats | | Kaden Fulcher (30 saves / 34 shots) |

| April 7 | Niagara IceDogs | 2 – 3 | OT | Hamilton Bulldogs | FirstOntario Centre | Recap |
| Sam Miletic (4) - pp - 7:25 | | First period | | 1:15 - pp - Matthew Strome (3) |
| No scoring | | Second period | | 14:09 - pp - Brandon Saigeon (8) |
| Matthew Philip (3) - pp - 5:16 | | Third period | | No scoring |
| No scoring | | First overtime period | | 6:25 - pp - Ryan Moore (4) |
| Stephen Dhillon (47 saves / 50 shots) | | Goalie stats | | Kaden Fulcher (21 saves / 23 shots) |

| April 9 | Hamilton Bulldogs | 3 – 4 | OT | Niagara IceDogs | Meridian Centre | Recap |
| No scoring | | First period | | 6:20 - Ben Jones (4); 7:18 - pp - Akil Thomas (5) |
| Isaac Nurse (5) - sh - 10:35 | | Second period | | 11:36 - pp - Elijah Roberts (1) |
| Ryan Moore (5) - 16:34; MacKenzie Entwistle (1) - pp - 19:15 | | Third period | | No scoring |
| No scoring | | First overtime period | | 11:27 - Kirill Maksimov (3) |
| Kaden Fulcher (29 saves / 33 shots) | | Goalie stats | | Stephen Dhillon (47 saves / 50 shots) |

| April 11 | Hamilton Bulldogs | 4 – 2 | Niagara IceDogs | Meridian Centre | Recap |
| Marián Studenič (1) - 9:07 | | First period | 9:59 - Kirill Maksimov (4) |
| No scoring | | Second period | 1:55 - Justin MacPherson (2) |
| Isaac Nurse (6) - 1:57; Marián Studenič (2) - 2:54; Robert Thomas (5) - sh - en - 19:59 | | Third period | No scoring |
| Kaden Fulcher (24 saves / 26 shots) | | Goalie stats | Stephen Dhillon (23 saves / 26 shots) |

| April 12 | Niagara IceDogs | 2 – 4 | Hamilton Bulldogs | FirstOntario Centre | Recap |
| No scoring | | First period | 12:59 - Robert Thomas (6) |
| No scoring | | Second period | No scoring |
| Johnny Corneil (1) - 11:41; Ben Jones (5) - 17:44 | | Third period | 10:20 - Matthew Strome (4); 11:24 - Nick Caamano (4); 19:37 - en - MacKenzie Entwistle (2) |
| Stephen Dhillon (30 saves / 33 shots) | | Goalie stats | Kaden Fulcher (30 saves / 32 shots) |

| Hamilton wins series 4 – 1 |

===== (2) Barrie Colts vs. (3) Kingston Frontenacs =====
| April 4 | Kingston Frontenacs | 5 – 6 | OT | Barrie Colts | Barrie Molson Centre | Recap |
| Linus Nyman (4) - pp - 7:55; Justin Pringle (1) - 17:42 | | First period | | 11:37 - Jaden Peca (2); 18:35 - Dmitry Sokolov (6) |
| Matt Hotchkiss (1) - 3:37 | | Second period | | 11:44 - Aaron Luchuk (4); 18:14 - Ryan Suzuki (1) |
| Jakob Brahaney (1) - pp - 4:51; Jason Robertson (5) - 9:15 | | Third period | | 6:59 - pp - Jason Willms (2) |
| No scoring | | First overtime period | | 1:58 - Jason Willms (3) |
| Jeremy Helvig (39 saves / 45 shots) | | Goalie stats | | Leonid Lazarev (23 saves / 28 shots) |

| April 6 | Kingston Frontenacs | 1 – 4 | Barrie Colts | Barrie Molson Centre | Recap |
| No scoring | | First period | 3:33 - pp - Justin Murray (2) |
| Jason Robertson (6) - 6:58 | | Second period | No scoring |
| No scoring | | Third period | 4:47 - Zachary Magwood (6); 18:39 - Andrei Svechnikov (3); 18:59 - en - Andrei Svechnikov (4) |
| Jeremy Helvig (31 saves / 34 shots) | | Goalie stats | Leonid Lazarev (40 saves / 41 shots) |

| April 8 | Barrie Colts | 2 – 4 | Kingston Frontenacs | Rogers K-Rock Centre | Recap |
| Andrei Svechnikov (5) - pp - 18:38 | | First period | 8:32 - pp - Jakob Brahaney (2); 9:34 - pp - Linus Nyman (5) |
| No scoring | | Second period | No scoring |
| Dmitry Sokolov (7) - pp - 6:27 | | Third period | 11:47 - Gabriel Vilardi (6); 19:08 - pp - en - Gabriel Vilardi (7) |
| Leonid Lazarev (25 saves / 28 shots) | | Goalie stats | Jeremy Helvig (28 saves / 30 shots) |

| April 10 | Barrie Colts | 2 – 4 | Kingston Frontenacs | Rogers K-Rock Centre | Recap |
| Lucas Chiodo (5) - pp - 16:34 | | First period | No scoring |
| Dmitry Sokolov (8) - 12:24 | | Second period | 5:28 - Gabriel Vilardi (8) - 5:28; 14:22 - Gabriel Vilardi (9); 17:57 - sh - Linus Nyman (6) |
| No scoring | | Third period | 19:46 - en - Cliff Pu (3) |
| Leonid Lazarev (32 saves / 35 shots) | | Goalie stats | Jeremy Helvig (30 saves / 32 shots) |

| April 12 | Kingston Frontenacs | 7 – 1 | Barrie Colts | Barrie Molson Centre | Recap |
| Max Jones (1) - 1:15; Gabriel Vilardi (10) - 5:13; Brett Neumann (2) - 14:07; Jason Robertson (7) - 17:18; Gabriel Vilardi (11) - 19:21 | | First period | 11:24 - Jason Willms (4) |
| Sean Day (3) - 1:54; Matt Hotchkiss (2) - 17:34 | | Second period | No scoring |
| No scoring | | Third period | No scoring |
| Jeremy Helvig (32 saves / 33 shots) | | Goalie stats | Leonid Lazarev (11 saves / 16 shots); Kai Edmonds (20 saves / 22 shots) |

| April 13 | Barrie Colts | 1 – 2 | Kingston Frontenacs | Rogers K-Rock Centre | Recap |
| No scoring | | First period | 12:41 - Brett Neumann (3) |
| Aaron Luchuk (5) - 2:51 | | Second period | 18:52 - Ted Nichol (2) |
| No scoring | | Third period | No scoring |
| Leonid Lazarev (23 saves / 25 shots) | | Goalie stats | Jeremy Helvig (29 saves / 30 shots) |

| Kingston wins series 4 – 2 |

==== Western conference semifinals ====
===== (1) Sault Ste. Marie Greyhounds vs. (4) Owen Sound Attack =====
| April 5 | Owen Sound Attack | 4 – 1 | Sault Ste. Marie Greyhounds | Essar Centre | Recap |
| Nick Suzuki (2) - pp - 11:28; Alan Lyszczarczyk (5) - 11:58; Sean Durzi (2) - 19:58 | | First period | No scoring |
| No scoring | | Second period | 6:54 - pp - Boris Katchouk (7) |
| Ethan Szypula (1) - en - 18:21 | | Third period | No scoring |
| Olivier Lafreniere (28 saves / 29 shots) | | Goalie stats | Matt Villalta (34 saves / 37 shots) |

| April 6 | Owen Sound Attack | 4 – 5 | OT | Sault Ste. Marie Greyhounds | Essar Centre | Recap |
| No scoring | | First period | | 13:47 - Hayden Verbeek (2); 18:42 - Hayden Verbeek (3) |
| Brett McKenzie (5) - 4:44; Maksim Sushko (2) - 13:45 | | Second period | | 19:58 - pp - Taylor Raddysh (5) |
| Brady Lyle (1) - pp - 9:20; Nick Suzuki (3) - pp - 18:35 | | Third period | | 11:11 - Morgan Frost (3) |
| No scoring | | First overtime period | | 1:15 - Tim Gettinger (2) |
| Olivier Lafreniere (34 saves / 39 shots) | | Goalie stats | | Matt Villalta (28 saves / 32 shots) |

| April 9 | Sault Ste. Marie Greyhounds | 2 – 6 | Owen Sound Attack | Harry Lumley Bayshore Community Centre | Recap |
| Morgan Frost (4) - pp - 10:47 | | First period | 4:03 - pp - Kevin Hancock (4) |
| Keeghan Howdeshell (3) - 0:38 | | Second period | 0:24 - Alan Lyszczarczyk (6); 7:11 - Aidan Dudas (2); 10:22 - Cade Robinson (1) |
| No scoring | | Third period | 6:35 - Kevin Hancock (5); 15:05 - Ethan Szypula (2) |
| Matt Villalta (21 saves / 27 shots) | | Goalie stats | Olivier Lafreniere (28 saves / 30 shots) |

| April 11 | Sault Ste. Marie Greyhounds | 5 – 2 | Owen Sound Attack | Harry Lumley Bayshore Community Centre | Recap |
| Boris Katchouk (8) - 14:37 | | First period | No scoring |
| Taylor Raddysh (6) - 1:00; Keeghan Howdeshell (4) - 7:57 | | Second period | 3:54 - pp - Kevin Hancock (6) |
| Keeghan Howdeshell (5) - 12:02; Conor Timmins (3) - en - 18:38 | | Third period | 9:35 - Ethan Szypula (3) |
| Matt Villalta (37 saves / 39 shots) | | Goalie stats | Olivier Lafreniere (36 saves / 40 shots) |

| April 13 | Owen Sound Attack | 1 – 4 | Sault Ste. Marie Greyhounds | Essar Centre | Recap |
| Alan Lyszczarczyk (7) - pp - 5:25 | | First period | 6:23 - Taylor Raddysh (7); 16:32 - pp - Barrett Hayton (2) |
| No scoring | | Second period | 4:27 - Barrett Hayton (3) |
| No scoring | | Third period | 19:12 - en - Morgan Frost (5) |
| Olivier Lafreniere (12 saves / 15 shots); Mack Guzda (15 saves / 15 shots) | | Goalie stats | Matt Villalta (28 saves / 29 shots) |

| April 15 | Sault Ste. Marie Greyhounds | 1 – 7 | Owen Sound Attack | Harry Lumley Bayshore Community Centre | Recap |
| Barrett Hayton (4) - 14:41 | | First period | 15:29 - Trenton Bourque(1) |
| No scoring | | Second period | 1:34 - Jonah Gadjovich (1); 8:10 - pp - Kevin Hancock (7); 17:13 - Ethan Szypula (4); 18:00 - Brett McKenzie (6) |
| No scoring | | Third period | 7:48 - Alan Lyszczarczyk (8); 17:00 - Aidan Dudas (3) |
| Matt Villalta (21 saves / 25 shots); Tyler Johnson (18 saves / 21 shots) | | Goalie stats | Mack Guzda (24 saves / 25 shots) |

| April 17 | Owen Sound Attack | 7 – 9 | Sault Ste. Marie Greyhounds | Essar Centre | Recap |
| Brett McKenzie (7) - 11:27 | | First period | 12:47 - Noah Carroll (1); 13:17 - Ryan Roth (1); 13:48 - Hayden Verbeek (4); 19:43 - sh - Boris Katchouk (9) |
| Sean Durzi (3) - 15:11 | | Second period | 9:47 - Boris Katchouk (10); 13:56 - Noah Carroll (2) |
| Brett McKenzie (8) - 4:14; Jacob Friend (1) - 14:44; Jonah Gadjovich (2) - 17:13; Sean Durzi (4) - 17:34; Kevin Hancock (9) - pp - 19:00 | | Third period | 0:16 - pp - Barrett Hayton (5); 13:46 - pp - Boris Katchouk (11); 18:03 - en - Taylor Raddysh (8) |
| Mack Guzda (22 saves / 29 shots); Olivier Lafreniere (3 saves / 4 shots) | | Goalie stats | Matt Villalta (29 saves / 36 shots) |

| Sault Ste. Marie wins series 4 – 3 |

===== (2) Kitchener Rangers vs. (3) Sarnia Sting =====
| April 6 | Sarnia Sting | 2 – 4 | Kitchener Rangers | Kitchener Memorial Auditorium | Recap |
| No scoring | | First period | No scoring |
| Ryan McGregor (3) - 6:16 | | Second period | 6:50 - Joseph Garreffa (6) |
| Theo Calvas (2) - 14:01 | | Third period | 3:08 - pp - Connor Bunnaman (3); 3:29 - pp - Logan Stanley (2); 5:51 - Kole Sherwood (8) |
| Justin Fazio (36 saves / 40 shots) | | Goalie stats | Mario Culina (29 saves / 31 shots) |

| April 8 | Sarnia Sting | 3 – 2 | OT | Kitchener Rangers | Kitchener Memorial Auditorium | Recap |
| No scoring | | First period | | No scoring |
| Franco Sproviero (2) - 9:27 | | Second period | | 4:54 - Riley Damiani (4) |
| Drake Rymsha (3) - 9:25 | | Third period | | 11:26 - pp - Kole Sherwood (9) |
| Sean Josling (4) - 10:10 | | First overtime period | | No scoring |
| Justin Fazio (36 saves / 38 shots) | | Goalie stats | | Mario Culina (32 saves / 35 shots) |

| April 10 | Kitchener Rangers | 1 – 4 | Sarnia Sting | Progressive Auto Sales Arena | Recap |
| No scoring | | First period | 8:51 - Franco Sproviero (3); 19:56 - Sean Josling (5) |
| No scoring | | Second period | No scoring |
| Joseph Garreffa (7) - pp - 8:19 | | Third period | 7:45 - Jonathan Ang (2); 19:22 - pp - en - Franco Sproviero (4) |
| Mario Culina (23 saves / 26 shots) | | Goalie stats | Justin Fazio (26 saves / 27 shots) |

| April 12 | Kitchener Rangers | 5 – 3 | Sarnia Sting | Progressive Auto Sales Arena | Recap |
| Kole Sherwood (10) - 5:14; Austin McEneny (1) - 7:54 | | First period | 2:07 - Connor Schlichting (1) |
| Jonathan Yantsis (3) - 14:34 | | Second period | 9:56 - Brayden Guy (1); 14:42 - Jordan Kyrou (2) |
| Givani Smith (5) - 8:03; Connor Bunnaman (4) - 10:00 | | Third period | No scoring |
| Mario Culina (33 saves / 36 shots) | | Goalie stats | Justin Fazio (27 saves / 32 shots) |

| April 13 | Sarnia Sting | 2 – 3 | OT | Kitchener Rangers | Kitchener Memorial Auditorium | Recap |
| No scoring | | First period | | No scoring |
| No scoring | | Second period | | 5:24 - Jack York (2) |
| Sean Josling (6) - 1:35; Hugo Leufvenius (6) - 10:37 | | Third period | | 14:52 - Nick McHugh (1) |
| No scoring | | First overtime period | | 7:56 - Rickard Hugg (1) |
| Justin Fazio (31 saves / 34 shots) | | Goalie stats | | Mario Culina (47 saves / 49 shots) |

| April 15 | Kitchener Rangers | 6 – 2 | Sarnia Sting | Progressive Auto Sales Arena | Recap |
| Adam Mascherin (5) - 16:19; Greg Meireles (2) - 19:43 | | First period | 15:43 - Anthony Salinitri (2) |
| Adam Mascherin (6) - 18:29 | | Second period | No scoring |
| Givani Smith (6) - 2:03; Logan Brown (3) - 3:26; Givani Smith (7) - 15:17 | | Third period | 5:27 - pp - Jordan Kyrou (3) |
| Mario Culina (37 saves / 39 shots) | | Goalie stats | Justin Fazio (23 saves / 29 shots) |

| Kitchener wins series 4 – 2 |

=== Conference finals ===
==== Eastern conference finals ====
===== (1) Hamilton Bulldogs vs. (3) Kingston Frontenacs =====
| April 18 | Kingston Frontenacs | 2 – 6 | Hamilton Bulldogs | FirstOntario Centre | Recap |
| No scoring | | First period | 9:39 - Nick Caamano (5); 17:24 - Benjamin Gleason (2) |
| Max Jones (2) - 16:52; Jason Robertson (8) - pp - 17:26 | | Second period | 0:52 - pp - Brandon Saigeon (9); 1:03 - Brandon Saigeon (10); 2:58 - pp - MacKenzie Entwistle (3); 10:39 - Ryan Moore (6) |
| No scoring | | Third period | No scoring |
| Jeremy Helvig (16 saves / 22 shots); Brendan Bonello (14 saves / 14 shots) | | Goalie stats | Kaden Fulcher (26 saves / 28 shots) |

| April 20 | Kingston Frontenacs | 1 – 7 | Hamilton Bulldogs | FirstOntario Centre | Recap |
| No scoring | | First period | 2:35 - Nick Caamano (6); 10:45 - Brandon Saigeon (11); 13:07 - sh - William Bitten (3); 14:40 - Robert Thomas (7); 14:51 - Ryan Moore (7) |
| Ryan Cranford (3) - 17:36 | | Second period | No scoring |
| No scoring | | Third period | 6:01 - pp - MacKenzie Entwistle (6); 10:44 - pp - Riley Stillman (3) |
| Jeremy Helvig (30 saves / 37 shots) | | Goalie stats | Kaden Fulcher (19 saves / 20 shots) |

| April 22 | Hamilton Bulldogs | 3 – 1 | Kingston Frontenacs | Rogers K-Rock Centre | Recap |
| Benjamin Gleason (3) - 1:16 | | First period | 18:21 - Ryan Cranford (4) |
| No scoring | | Second period | No scoring |
| Isaac Nurse (7) - 5:50; Brandon Saigeon (12) - en - 19:34 | | Third period | No scoring |
| Kaden Fulcher (30 saves / 31 shots) | | Goalie stats | Jeremy Helvig (28 saves / 30 shots) |

| April 24 | Hamilton Bulldogs | 2 – 5 | Kingston Frontenacs | Rogers K-Rock Centre | Recap |
| MacKenzie Entwistle (5) - 5:54; Arthur Kaliyev (2) - 10:17 | | First period | 3:32 - Cliff Pu (4); 14:17 - Max Jones (3) |
| No scoring | | Second period | 15:03 - Sam Field (1) |
| No scoring | | Third period | 9:49 - pp - Jason Robertson (9); 11:34 - pp - Sean Day (4) |
| Kaden Fulcher (24 saves / 29 shots) | | Goalie stats | Jeremy Helvig (30 saves / 32 shots) |

| April 26 | Kingston Frontenacs | 1 – 2 | Hamilton Bulldogs | FirstOntario Centre | Recap |
| Jason Robertson (10) - 9:50 | | First period | No scoring |
| No scoring | | Second period | 8:22 - Justin Lemcke (2) |
| No scoring | | Third period | 12:56 - Connor Walters (1) |
| Jeremy Helvig (36 saves / 38 shots) | | Goalie stats | Kaden Fulcher (17 saves / 18 shots) |

| Hamilton wins series 4 – 1 |

==== Western conference finals ====
===== (1) Sault Ste. Marie Greyhounds vs. (2) Kitchener Rangers =====
| April 20 | Kitchener Rangers | 2 – 3 | Sault Ste. Marie Greyhounds | Essar Centre | Recap |
| Connor Bunnaman (5) - pp - 10:29 | | First period | 16:50 - pp - Jack Kopacka (5) |
| Givani Smith (8) - pp - 8:03 | | Second period | 12:09 - Conor Timmins (4) |
| No scoring | | Third period | 19:59 - sh - Conor Timmins (5) |
| Mario Culina (29 saves / 32 shots) | | Goalie stats | Matt Villalta (18 saves / 20 shots) |

| April 21 | Kitchener Rangers | 2 – 4 | Sault Ste. Marie Greyhounds | Essar Centre | Recap |
| Adam Mascherin (7) - 1:44 | | First period | No scoring |
| No scoring | | Second period | 11:18 - Morgan Frost (6) |
| Logan Stanley (3) - 19:33 | | Third period | 7:50 - Boris Katchouk (12); 18:48 - sh - en - Boris Katchouk (13); 19:52 - en - Taylor Raddysh (9) |
| Mario Culina (28 saves / 30 shots) | | Goalie stats | Matt Villalta (34 saves / 36 shots) |

| April 23 | Sault Ste. Marie Greyhounds | 0 – 3 | Kitchener Rangers | Kitchener Memorial Auditorium | Recap |
| No scoring | | First period | No scoring |
| No scoring | | Second period | 0:41 - Riley Damiani (5) |
| No scoring | | Third period | 1:49 - Kole Sherwood (11); 18:09 - en - Nick McHugh (2) |
| Matt Villalta (37 saves / 39 shots) | | Goalie stats | Mario Culina (24 saves / 24 shots) |

| April 25 | Sault Ste. Marie Greyhounds | 4 – 7 | Kitchener Rangers | Kitchener Memorial Auditorium | Recap |
| No scoring | | First period | 4:19 - pp - Logan Brown (4); 4:57 - Greg Meireles (3); 11:28 - Adam Mascherin (8); 16:51 - Givani Smith (9) |
| Taylor Raddysh (10) - pp - 19:53 | | Second period | 13:30 - Kole Sherwood (12); 18:14 - pp - Givani Smith (10) |
| Tim Gettinger (3) - 2:03; Keeghan Howdeshell (6) - 8:07; Keeghan Howdeshell (7) - sh - 18:12 | | Third period | 5:14 - Rickard Hugg (2) |
| Matt Villalta (11 saves / 15 shots); Tyler Johnson (15 saves / 18 shots) | | Goalie stats | Mario Culina (30 saves / 34 shots) |

| April 27 | Kitchener Rangers | 3 – 7 | Sault Ste. Marie Greyhounds | Essar Centre | Recap |
| Nick McHugh (3) - 3:54 | | First period | 2:09 - Jacob LeGuerrier (1); 5:06 - Jack Kopacka (6); 14:58 - Keeghan Howdeshell (8) |
| Logan Brown (5) - 1:16 | | Second period | 17:10 - pp - Tim Gettinger (4); 18:25 - Jack Kopacka (7) |
| Kole Sherwood (13) - pp - 8:07 | | Third period | 4:26 - Jacob LeGuerrier (2); 19:05 - en - Jack Kopacka (8) |
| Mario Culina (37 saves / 43 shots) | | Goalie stats | Matt Villalta (17 saves / 20 shots) |

| April 29 | Sault Ste. Marie Greyhounds | 3 – 4 | OT | Kitchener Rangers | Kitchener Memorial Auditorium | Recap |
| Mac Hollowell (2) - 8:21 | | First period | | No scoring |
| No scoring | | Second period | | 15:28 - Givani Smith (11) |
| Taylor Raddysh (11) - 15:21; Taylor Raddysh (12) - pp - 18:35 | | Third period | | 2:27 - Joseph Garreffa (8); 14:24 - pp - Adam Mascherin (9) |
| No scoring | | First overtime period | | 13:12 - Kole Sherwood (14) |
| Matt Villalta (34 saves / 38 shots) | | Goalie stats | | Mario Culina (45 saves / 48 shots) |

| April 30 | Kitchener Rangers | 3 – 4 | 2OT | Sault Ste. Marie Greyhounds | Essar Centre | Recap |
| No scoring | | First period | | 15:27 - Boris Katchouk (14) |
| Jonathan Yantsis (4) - 2:47; Rickard Hugg (3) - pp - 11:40 | | Second period | | 9:01 - Boris Katchouk (15) |
| Logan Stanley (4) - 19:08 | | Third period | | 11:41 - pp - Morgan Frost (7) |
| No scoring | | Second overtime period | | 4:00 - Jack Kopacka (9) |
| Mario Culina (37 saves / 41 shots) | | Goalie stats | | Matt Villalta (33 saves / 36 shots) |

| Sault Ste. Marie wins series 4 – 3 |

=== J. Ross Robertson Cup ===
==== (W1) Sault Ste. Marie Greyhounds vs. (E1) Hamilton Bulldogs ====
| May 3 | Hamilton Bulldogs | 4 – 3 | OT | Sault Ste. Marie Greyhounds | Essar Centre | Recap |
| MacKenzie Entwistle (6) - 17:27 | | First period | | No scoring |
| Robert Thomas (9) - 0:14; Brandon Saigeon (13) - 3:43 | | Second period | | 8:24 - Barrett Hayton (6); 10:24 - Boris Katchouk (16) |
| No scoring | | Third period | | 5:53 - Taylor Raddysh (13) |
| MacKenzie Entwistle (7) - 1:57 | | First overtime period | | No scoring |
| Kaden Fulcher (28 saves / 31 shots) | | Goalie stats | | Matt Villalta (26 saves / 30 shots) |

| May 5 | Hamilton Bulldogs | 2 – 4 | Sault Ste. Marie Greyhounds | Essar Centre | Recap |
| MacKenzie Entwistle (8) - pp - 19:35 | | First period | 4:19 - pp - Barrett Hayton (7) |
| No scoring | | Second period | 8:29 - pp - Morgan Frost (8); 11:18 - Jack Kopacka (10) |
| Brandon Saigeon (14) - pp - 12:46 | | Third period | 19:46 - sh - en - Morgan Frost (9) |
| Kaden Fulcher (30 saves / 33 shots) | | Goalie stats | Matt Villalta (36 saves / 38 shots) |

| May 7 | Sault Ste. Marie Greyhounds | 5 – 6 | Hamilton Bulldogs | FirstOntario Centre | Recap |
| Joe Carroll (1) - 1:55; Tim Gettinger (5) - 19:01 | | First period | 4:21 - Nick Caamano (7); 10:08 - pp - Arthur Kaliyev (3); 13:35 - William Bitten (4) |
| Tim Gettinger (6) - pp - 8:29 | | Second period | 0:18 - Brandon Saigeon (15); 15:57 - Brandon Saigeon (16) |
| Jack Kopacka (11) - pp - 9:45; Morgan Frost (10) - pp - 18:28 | | Third period | 17:02 - Marián Studenič (3) |
| Matt Villalta (27 saves / 33 shots) | | Goalie stats | Kaden Fulcher (28 saves / 33 shots) |

| May 9 | Sault Ste. Marie Greyhounds | 3 – 2 | OT | Hamilton Bulldogs | FirstOntario Centre | Recap |
| Boris Katchouk (17) - 0:34 | | First period | | 17:37 - sh - Nick Caamano (8) |
| Jack Kopacka (12) - 2:12 | | Second period | | No scoring |
| No scoring | | Third period | | 8:52 - Riley Stillman (4) |
| Noah Carroll (3) - 9:13 | | First overtime period | | No scoring |
| Matt Villalta (45 saves / 47 shots) | | Goalie stats | | Kaden Fulcher (28 saves / 31 shots) |

| May 11 | Hamilton Bulldogs | 6 – 4 | Sault Ste. Marie Greyhounds | Essar Centre | Recap |
| MacKenzie Entwistle (9) - 1:39 | | First period | No scoring |
| Robert Thomas (10) - 2:14; Ryan Moore (8); Robert Thomas (11) - 16:13 | | Second period | 0:57 - Keeghan Howdeshell (9) |
| Brandon Saigeon (17) - 7:06; Nick Caamano (9) - en - 18:35 | | Third period | 9:08 - Tim Gettinger (7); 10:53 - pp - Boris Katchouk (18); 14:32 - Jack Kopacka (13) |
| Kaden Fulcher (30 saves / 34 shots) | | Goalie stats | Matt Villalta (28 saves / 33 shots) |

| May 13 | Sault Ste. Marie Greyhounds | 4 – 5 | Hamilton Bulldogs | FirstOntario Centre | Recap |
| Cole MacKay (1) - 11:57 | | First period | No scoring |
| Boris Katchouk (19) - 3:10; Barrett Hayton (8) - pp - 18:53 | | Second period | 8:55 - Brandon Saigeon (18); 17:37 - MacKenzie Entwistle (10) |
| Jordan Sambrook (1) - 19:15 | | Third period | 8:28 - Riley Stillman (5); 11:30 - Robert Thomas (12); 18:02 - en - Nick Caamano (10) |
| Matt Villalta (32 saves / 36 shots) | | Goalie stats | Kaden Fulcher (40 saves / 44 shots) |

| Hamilton wins series 4 – 2 |

=== J. Ross Robertson Cup Champions Roster ===
2017-18 Hamilton Bulldogs
| Goaltenders: (Canada) 29 – Nick Donofrio; (Canada) 33 – Kaden Fulcher | Defencemen: (Canada) 5 – Justin Lemcke – C; (Canada) 7 – Kade Landry; (Canada) 9 – Jake Gravelle; (Canada) 22 – Jack Hanley; (Canada) 24 – Connor Walters; (United States) 42 – Benjamin Gleason; (Canada) 52 – Nicolas Mattinen; (Canada) 61 – Riley Stillman | Wingers: (Canada) 10 – Nicholas Caamano; (Canada) 11 – Isaac Nurse; (Canada) 12 – Zachary Jackson; (Canada) 14 – William Bitten; (Canada) 15 – Navrin Mutter; (Canada) 18 – Matthew Strome; (Slovakia) 28 – Marián Studenič; (United States) 34 – Arthur Kaliyev; (Canada) 44 – MacKenzie Entwistle; (Canada) 81 – Liam Van Loon | Centres: (Canada) 16 – Owen Burnell; (Canada) 17 – Brandon Saigeon; (Canada) 19 – Ben Garagan; (United States) 40 – Ryan Moore; (Canada) 77 – Jake Murray; Coach: (United States) John Gruden; General Manager: (Canada) Steve Staios |

=== Playoff scoring leaders ===
Note: GP = Games played; G = Goals; A = Assists; Pts = Points; PIM = Penalty minutes

| Player | Team | GP | G | A | Pts | PIM |
|---|---|---|---|---|---|---|
| Boris Katchouk | Sault Ste. Marie Greyhounds | 24 | 19 | 18 | 37 | 8 |
| Taylor Raddysh | Sault Ste. Marie Greyhounds | 24 | 13 | 21 | 34 | 14 |
| Robert Thomas | Hamilton Bulldogs | 21 | 12 | 20 | 32 | 14 |
| Morgan Frost | Sault Ste. Marie Greyhounds | 24 | 10 | 19 | 29 | 26 |
| Logan Brown | Kitchener Rangers | 19 | 5 | 22 | 27 | 6 |
| Kole Sherwood | Kitchener Rangers | 19 | 14 | 12 | 26 | 30 |
| Ryan Moore | Hamilton Bulldogs | 21 | 8 | 18 | 26 | 30 |
| Brandon Saigeon | Hamilton Bulldogs | 21 | 18 | 7 | 25 | 10 |
| Adam Mascherin | Kitchener Rangers | 19 | 9 | 15 | 24 | 16 |
| Gabriel Vilardi | Kingston Frontenacs | 16 | 11 | 11 | 22 | 14 |
| Nick Caamano | Hamilton Bulldogs | 21 | 10 | 12 | 22 | 22 |
| Tim Gettinger | Sault Ste. Marie Greyhounds | 24 | 7 | 15 | 22 | 4 |

=== Playoff leading goaltenders ===
Note: GP = Games played; Mins = Minutes played; W = Wins; L = Losses: OTL = Overtime losses; SL = Shootout losses; GA = Goals Allowed; SO = Shutouts; GAA = Goals against average

| Player | Team | GP | Mins | W | L | GA | SO | Sv% | GAA |
|---|---|---|---|---|---|---|---|---|---|
| Kaden Fulcher | Hamilton Bulldogs | 21 | 1290 | 16 | 5 | 58 | 0 | 0.905 | 2.70 |
| Mario Culina | Kitchener Rangers | 19 | 1161 | 11 | 6 | 54 | 1 | 0.917 | 2.79 |
| Stephen Dhillon | Niagara IceDogs | 10 | 621 | 5 | 5 | 29 | 0 | 0.924 | 2.80 |
| Michael DiPietro | Windsor Spitfires | 6 | 342 | 2 | 4 | 16 | 0 | 0.934 | 2.81 |
| Justin Fazio | Sarnia Sting | 12 | 729 | 6 | 6 | 37 | 0 | 0.890 | 3.04 |

== Awards ==
Playoffs trophies
| Trophy name | Recognition | Recipient |
|---|---|---|
| J. Ross Robertson Cup | OHL Finals champion | Hamilton Bulldogs |
| Bobby Orr Trophy | Eastern Conference champion | Hamilton Bulldogs |
| Wayne Gretzky Trophy | Western Conference champion | Sault Ste. Marie Greyhounds |
| Wayne Gretzky 99 Award | Playoffs MVP | Robert Thomas, Hamilton Bulldogs |
Regular season — Team trophies
| Trophy name | Recognition | Recipient |
| Hamilton Spectator Trophy | Team with best record | Sault Ste. Marie Greyhounds |
| Leyden Trophy | East division champion | Hamilton Bulldogs |
| Emms Trophy | Central division champion | Barrie Colts |
| Bumbacco Trophy | West division champion | Sault Ste. Marie Greyhounds |
| Holody Trophy | Midwest division champion | Kitchener Rangers |
Regular season — Executive awards
| Trophy name | Recognition | Recipient |
| Matt Leyden Trophy | Coach of the year | Drew Bannister, Sault Ste. Marie Greyhounds |
| Bill Long Award | Lifetime achievement | – |
| OHL Executive of the Year | Executive of the Year | – |
Regular season — Player awards
| Trophy name | Recognition | Recipient |
| Red Tilson Trophy | Most outstanding player | Jordan Kyrou, Sarnia Sting |
| Eddie Powers Memorial Trophy | Top scorer | Aaron Luchuk, Windsor/Barrie |
| Dave Pinkney Trophy | Lowest team goals against | M. Villalta & T. Johnson, Sault Ste. Marie Greyhounds |
| Max Kaminsky Trophy | Most outstanding defenceman | Nicolas Hague, Mississauga Steelheads |
| Jim Mahon Memorial Trophy | Top scoring right winger | Jordan Kyrou, Sarnia Sting |
| Emms Family Award | Rookie of the year | Andrei Svechnikov, Barrie Colts |
| William Hanley Trophy | Most sportsmanlike player | Nick Suzuki, Owen Sound Attack |
| F. W. "Dinty" Moore Trophy | Best rookie GAA | Jordan Kooy, London Knights |
| Bobby Smith Trophy | Scholastic player of the year | Barrett Hayton, Sault Ste. Marie Greyhounds |
| Leo Lalonde Memorial Trophy | Overage player of the year | Aaron Luchuk, Windsor/Barrie |
| OHL Goaltender of the Year | Goaltender of the year | Michael DiPietro, Windsor Spitfires |
| Dan Snyder Memorial Trophy | Humanitarian of the year | Garrett McFadden, Guelph Storm |
| Roger Neilson Memorial Award | Top academic college/university player | Stephen Gibson, Mississauga Steelheads |
| Ivan Tennant Memorial Award | Top academic high school player | Mack Guzda, Owen Sound Attack |
| Mickey Renaud Captain's Trophy | Team captain that best exemplifies character and commitment | Justin Lemcke, Hamilton Bulldogs |
Prospect player awards
| Trophy name | Recognition | Recipient |
| Jack Ferguson Award | First overall pick in priority selection | Quinton Byfield, Sudbury Wolves |
| Tim Adams Memorial Trophy | OHL Cup MVP | Dylan Robinson, Toronto Jr. Canadiens |

== All-Star teams ==
The OHL All-Star Teams were selected by the OHL's General Managers.

=== First team ===
- Morgan Frost, Centre, Sault Ste. Marie Greyhounds
- Boris Katchouk, Left Wing, Sault Ste. Marie Greyhounds
- Jordan Kyrou, Right Wing, Sarnia Sting
- Nicolas Hague, Defence, Mississauga Steelheads
- Evan Bouchard, Defence, London Knights
- Michael DiPietro, Goaltender, Windsor Spitfires
- Drew Bannister, Coach, Sault Ste. Marie Greyhounds

=== Second team ===
- Aaron Luchuk, Centre, Windsor Spitfires/Barrie Colts
- Sam Miletic, Left Wing, London Knights/Niagara IceDogs
- Taylor Raddysh, Right Wing, Sault Ste. Marie Greyhounds
- Sean Durzi, Defence, Owen Sound Attack
- Conor Timmins, Defence, Sault Ste. Marie Greyhounds
- Jeremy Helvig, Goaltender, Kingston Frontenacs
- Dale Hawerchuk, Coach, Barrie Colts

=== Third team ===
- Gabriel Vilardi, Centre, Kingston Frontenacs
- Adam Mascherin, Left Wing, Kitchener Rangers
- Jason Robertson, Right Wing, Kingston Frontenacs
- Cam Dineen, Defence, Sarnia Sting
- Joey Keane, Defence, Barrie Colts
- Matt Villalta, Goaltender, Sault Ste. Marie Greyhounds
- Trevor Letowski, Coach, Windsor Spitfires

== 2018 OHL Priority Selection ==
On April 7, 2018, the OHL conducted the 2018 Ontario Hockey League Priority Selection. The Sudbury Wolves held the first overall pick in the draft, and selected Quinton Byfield from the York-Simcoe Express of the OMHA. Byfield was awarded the Jack Ferguson Award, awarded to the top pick in the draft.

Below are the players who were selected in the first round of the 2018 Ontario Hockey League Priority Selection.

| # | Player | Nationality | OHL team | Hometown | Minor team |
|---|---|---|---|---|---|
| 1 | Quinton Byfield (C) | Canada | Sudbury Wolves | Newmarket, Ontario | York-Simcoe Express (OMHA-EHL) |
| 2 | Evan Vierling (C) | Canada | Flint Firebirds | Aurora, Ontario | York-Simcoe Express (OMHA-EHL) |
| 3 | William Cuylle (LW) | Canada | Peterborough Petes | Toronto, Ontario | Toronto Marlboros (GTHL) |
| 4 | Jamie Drysdale (D) | Canada | Erie Otters | Toronto, Ontario | Toronto Marlboros (GTHL) |
| 5 | Cole Perfetti (C) | Canada | Saginaw Spirit | Whitby, Ontario | Vaughan Kings (GTHL) |
| 6 | Cameron Tolnai (C) | Canada | Ottawa 67's | Oakville, Ontario | Oakville Rangers (OMHA-SCTA) |
| 7 | Daniil Chayka (D) | Russia | Guelph Storm | Moscow, Russia | Toronto Jr. Canadiens (GTHL) |
| 8 | James Hardie (LW) | Canada | Mississauga Steelheads | Innisfil, Ontario | Barrie Jr. Colts (OMHA-EHL) |
| 9 | Pacey Schlueting (D) | Canada | North Bay Battalion | North Bay, Ontario | North Bay Trappers (NOHA) |
| 10 | Jean-Luc Foudy (C) | Canada | Windsor Spitfires | Toronto, Ontario | Toronto Titans (GTHL) |
| 11 | Tyler Tullio (C) | / (United States) Canada/USA | Oshawa Generals | Lakeshore, Ontario | Vaughan Kings (GTHL) |
| 12 | Lleyton Moore (D) | Canada | Niagara IceDogs | Woodbridge, Ontario | Toronto Marlboros (GTHL) |
| 13 | Jake Murray (D) | Canada | Kingston Frontenacs | Oakville, Ontario | Oakville Rangers (OMHA-SCTA) |
| 14 | Luke Evangelista (RW) | Canada | London Knights | Oakville, Ontario | Oakville Rangers (OMHA-SCTA) |
| 15 | Nolan Seed (D) | Canada | Owen Sound Attack | Newboro, Ontario | Smiths Falls Bears (HEO Midget) |
| 16 | Riley Piercey (RW) | Canada | Barrie Colts | Mississauga, Ontario | Toronto Marlboros (GTHL) |
| 17 | Reid Valade (RW) | Canada | Kitchener Rangers | Caledon, Ontario | Toronto Marlboros (GTHL) |
| 18 | Logan Morrison (C) | Canada | Hamilton Bulldogs | Guelph, Ontario | Guelph Gryphons (OMHA-SCTA) |
| 19 | Jacob Perreault (C) | / (United States) Canada/USA | Sarnia Sting | Hinsdale, Illinois | Chicago Mission 16u (HPHL) |
| 20 | Ryan O'Rourke (D) | Canada | Sault Ste. Marie Greyhounds | Pickering, Ontario | Vaughan Kings (GTHL) |

== 2018 NHL entry draft ==
On June 22-23, 2018, the National Hockey League conducted the 2018 NHL entry draft held at the American Airlines Center in Dallas, Texas. In total, 35 players from the Ontario Hockey League were selected in the draft. Andrei Svechnikov of the Barrie Colts was the first player from the OHL to be selected, as he was taken with the second overall pick by the Carolina Hurricanes.

Below are the players selected from OHL teams at the NHL Entry Draft.

| Round | # | Player | Nationality | NHL team | Hometown | OHL team |
|---|---|---|---|---|---|---|
| 1 | 2 | Andrei Svechnikov (RW) | Russia | Carolina Hurricanes | Barnaul, Russia | Barrie Colts |
| 1 | 5 | Barrett Hayton (C) | Canada | Arizona Coyotes | Peterborough, Ontario | Sault Ste. Marie Greyhounds |
| 1 | 10 | Evan Bouchard (D) | Canada | Edmonton Oilers | Oakville, Ontario | London Knights |
| 1 | 13 | Ty Dellandrea (C) | Canada | Dallas Stars | Port Perry, Ontario | Flint Firebirds |
| 1 | 18 | Liam Foudy (C) | Canada | Columbus Blue Jackets | Scarborough, Ontario | London Knights |
| 1 | 21 | Ryan Merkley (D) | Canada | San Jose Sharks | Mississauga, Ontario | Guelph Storm |
| 1 | 29 | Rasmus Sandin (D) | Sweden | Toronto Maple Leafs | Uppsala, Sweden | Sault Ste. Marie Greyhounds |
| 2 | 34 | Serron Noel (RW) | Canada | Florida Panthers | Ottawa, Ontario | Oshawa Generals |
| 2 | 40 | Ryan McLeod (C) | Canada | Edmonton Oilers | Mississauga, Ontario | Mississauga Steelheads |
| 2 | 47 | Kody Clark (RW) | Canada | Washington Capitals | Toronto, Ontario | Ottawa 67's |
| 2 | 51 | Akil Thomas (C) | Canada | Los Angeles Kings | Scarborough, Ontario | Niagara IceDogs |
| 2 | 52 | Sean Durzi (D) | Canada | Toronto Maple Leafs | Mississauga, Ontario | Owen Sound Attack |
| 2 | 55 | Kevin Bahl (D) | Canada | Arizona Coyotes | Mississauga, Ontario | Ottawa 67's |
| 3 | 66 | Cam Hillis (C) | Canada | Montreal Canadiens | Enniskillen, Ontario | Guelph Storm |
| 3 | 67 | Alec Regula (D) | United States | Detroit Red Wings | West Bloomfield, Michigan | London Knights |
| 3 | 76 | Semyon Der-Arguchintsev (C) | Russia | Toronto Maple Leafs | Moscow, Russia | Peterborough Petes |
| 3 | 88 | Joey Keane (D) | United States | New York Rangers | Homer Glen, Illinois | Barrie Colts |
| 4 | 97 | Allan McShane (LW) | Canada | Montreal Canadiens | Collingwood, Ontario | Oshawa Generals |
| 4 | 100 | Adam Mascherin (LW) | Canada | Dallas Stars | Maple, Ontario | Kitchener Rangers |
| 4 | 101 | Nico Gross (D) | Switzerland | New York Rangers | Pontresina, Switzerland | Oshawa Generals |
| 4 | 106 | Curtis Douglas (C) | Canada | Dallas Stars | Oakville, Ontario | Windsor Spitfires |
| 4 | 113 | Aidan Dudas (C) | Canada | Los Angeles Kings | Parry Sound, Ontario | Owen Sound Attack |
| 4 | 118 | Mac Hollowell (D) | Canada | Toronto Maple Leafs | Niagara Falls, Ontario | Sault Ste. Marie Greyhounds |
| 5 | 134 | Blade Jenkins (LW) | United States | New York Islanders | Jackson, Michigan | Saginaw Spirit |
| 5 | 137 | Riley Damiani (C) | Canada | Dallas Stars | Mississauga, Ontario | Kitchener Rangers |
| 5 | 140 | Brandon Saigeon (C) | Canada | Colorado Avalanche | Grimsby, Ontario | Hamilton Bulldogs |
| 5 | 145 | Dennis Busby (D) | Canada | Arizona Coyotes | Barrie, Ontario | Flint Firebirds |
| 5 | 150 | Declan Chisholm (D) | Canada | Winnipeg Jets | Bowmanville, Ontario | Peterborough Petes |
| 5 | 153 | Giovanni Vallati (D) | Canada | Winnipeg Jets | Ottawa, Ontario | Kitchener Rangers |
| 5 | 154 | Connor Corcoran (D) | Canada | Vegas Golden Knights | Beeton, Ontario | Windsor Spitfires |
| 5 | 155 | Damien Giroux (C) | Canada | Minnesota Wild | Hanmer, Ontario | Saginaw Spirit |
| 6 | 172 | Mitchell Hoelscher (C) | Canada | New Jersey Devils | Elora, Ontario | Ottawa 67's |
| 6 | 175 | Jacob Ingham (G) | Canada | Los Angeles Kings | Barrie, Ontario | Mississauga Steelheads |
| 7 | 200 | Tyler Tucker (D) | Canada | St. Louis Blues | Longlac, Ontario | Barrie Colts |
| 7 | 208 | Jordan Kooy (G) | Canada | Vegas Golden Knights | Bradford, Ontario | London Knights |

== 2018 CHL Import Draft ==
On June 28, 2018, the Canadian Hockey League conducted the 2018 CHL Import Draft, in which teams in all three CHL leagues participate in. The Sudbury Wolves held the first pick in the draft by a team in the OHL, and selected Ukko-Pekka Luukkonen from Finland with their selection.

Below are the players who were selected in the first round by Ontario Hockey League teams in the 2018 CHL Import Draft.

| # | Player | Nationality | OHL team | Hometown | Last team |
|---|---|---|---|---|---|
| 3 | Ukko-Pekka Luukkonen (G) | Finland | Sudbury Wolves | Espoo, Finland | Leki |
| 6 | Jan Jeník (RW) | Czech Republic | Flint Firebirds | Brno, Czech Republic | Benátky nad Jizerou HC |
| 9 | Liam Kirk (LW) | United Kingdom | Peterborough Petes | Nottingham, United Kingdom | Sheffield Steelers |
| 12 | Petr Čajka (C) | Czech Republic | Erie Otters | Kadaň, Czech Republic | Zug EV Jr. |
| 15 | Ivan Prosvetov (G) | Russia | Saginaw Spirit | Moscow, Russia | Youngstown Phantoms |
| 18 | Marco Rossi (C) | Austria | Ottawa 67's | Feldkirch, Austria | Zurich GCK Lions Jr. |
| 21 | No selection made | | Guelph Storm | | |
| 24 | Filip Reisnecker (LW) | Czech Republic | Mississauga Steelheads | Prague, Czech Republic | Regensburg Jr. |
| 27 | Yegor Postnov (LW) | Russia | North Bay Battalion | Moscow, Russia | Stupino Capitan |
| 30 | Kari Piiroinen (G) | Finland | Windsor Spitfires | Helsinki, Finland | HIFK Helsinki B |
| 33 | Nando Eggenberger (LW) | Switzerland | Kingston Frontenacs | Chur, Switzerland | Davos HC |
| 36 | Kyen Sopa (LW) | Switzerland | Niagara IceDogs | Flawil, Switzerland | Bern Future SC Jr. |
| 39 | Ian Derungs (LW) | Switzerland | Kingston Frontenacs | Frauenfeld, Switzerland | Kloten EHC Sports AG Jr. |
| 42 | Matvei Guskov (C) | Russia | London Knights | Nizhnekamsk, Russia | Moscow CSKA U17 |
| 45 | Manuel Alberg (RW) | Germany | Owen Sound Attack | Koln, Germany | Kolner EC Jr. |
| 48 | Maksim Zhukov (G) | Russia | Barrie Colts | Kaliningrad, Russia | Green Bay Gamblers |
| 51 | Axel Andersson (D) | Sweden | Kitchener Rangers | Södertälje, Sweden | Djurgardens IF Jr. |
| 54 | Philip Broberg (D) | Sweden | Hamilton Bulldogs | Örebro, Sweden | AIK IF Jr. |
| 56 | No selection made | | Sarnia Sting | | |
| 58 | Roman Půček (LW) | Czech Republic | Sault Ste. Marie Greyhounds | Vsetín, Czech Republic | Vsetín Jr. B |

| Preceded by 2016–17 OHL season | OHL seasons | Succeeded by 2018–19 OHL season |
