= Adam Mascherin =

Canadian ice hockey player (born 1998)

- Born: June 6, 1998 (age 28) Maple, Ontario, Canada
- Height: 5 ft 10 in (178 cm)
- Weight: 205 lb (93 kg; 14 st 9 lb)
- Position: Left wing
- Shot: Left
- Played for: Texas Stars; Skellefteå AIK
- NHL draft: 38th overall, 2016; Florida Panthers; 100th overall, 2018; Dallas Stars
- Playing career: 2018–2023

Adam Mascherin ([maskeˈrin]; born June 6, 1998) is a Canadian former professional ice hockey player. He played for Skellefteå AIK in the Swedish Hockey League (SHL). He was originally drafted 38th overall by the Florida Panthers in the 2016 NHL entry draft but, after failing to sign with the team, he was re-drafted by the Dallas Stars in 2018.

== Early life ==
Mascherin was born on June 6, 1998, in Maple, Ontario and attended Maple High School, to parents Sandy and Sylvie. Growing up, he would shoot 500 pucks a day into a net in front of his parents’ garage while his twin brother Aedan stood in net. Eventually, his brother and friends refused to be his goaltender due to his hard shots. He also played basketball from elementary school until Grade 8 when he chose to fixate on hockey.

== Playing career ==
Growing up in Ontario, Mascherin played with the Georgetown Raiders of the Ontario Junior Hockey League and Vaughan Kings Minor Midget team of the Greater Toronto Hockey League (GTHL). During the 2013–14 season, Mascherin won the GTHL's Player of the Year Award after recording 67 goals and 62 assists in 61 games. Mascherin said he tried to model his game after Tampa Bay Lightning star Steven Stamkos. While playing minor hockey, Mascherin said he would lean on twin brother for tips on opposing netminders while watching opposing teams play.

=== Major junior ===
Following the 2013–14 season, Mascherin was drafted second overall by the Kitchener Rangers in the 2014 Ontario Hockey League (OHL) Priority Selection. Prior to the draft, Mascherin was described by a scout as "one of the purest goal scorers that I have seen in a number of years." The Rangers' head coach Troy Smith also praised his shooting ability, saying "Mascherin has a world-class shot with a world-class release." He subsequently committed to join the Rangers for their 2014–15 season. Prior to the start of the season, Mascherin was invited to participate in Canada's national under-17 development camp and was eventually named to the Team Canada Red roster for the 2014 World U-17 Hockey Challenge. Coach Troy Smith and his coaching staff moved Mascherin from his natural centre position to the left wing so he could work on creating offence. Mascherin finished his rookie season with 12 goals and 29 points in 62 regular season games, which earned him the team's Michael Pappert Memorial Trophy as Rookie of the Year and a selection to the OHL's Second All-Rookie Team.

Following his rookie season, Mascherin experienced a breakout sophomore campaign with points in each of his first eleven games. He was injured in his 12th game of the season but returned to the lineup after a few games and continued to register points. By December, Mascherin was second in team scoring with 14 goals and 20 assists and he finished the season with a total of 81 points in 61 games. As a result of his play, he was ranked 42nd amongst all North American skaters eligible for the 2016 NHL entry draft by the NHL Central Scouting Bureau. It was later debated amongst scouts that Mascherin was only ranked so low due to his height. He finished the season with numerous team awards including Les Bradley Memorial Award as the Most Improved Player and Jim Reilly Trophy as the Team Scoring Leader.

Upon finishing the 2015–16 season with 35 goals and 81 points in 65 games, Mascherin was drafted by the Florida Panthers in the second round of the 2016 NHL Entry Draft. Prior to being drafted, Panthers general manager Tom Rowe described Mascherin as "the best pure goal scorer in the OHL, if not all of Canada." He subsequently attended the Panthers' Development Camp and Rookie Tournament. Prior to returning the Rangers for the 2016–17 season, Mascherin said he would eagerly work on what the coaching staff told him to. On January 2, 2018, Mascherin scored a career-high four goals in one game as the Rangers beat the Peterborough Petes in a 5–4 overtime win.

=== Professional ===
As he did not sign with the Panthers by the June 1 deadline, Mascherin was re-entered into the 2018 NHL entry draft. He was eventually drafted in the fourth round, 100th overall, by the Dallas Stars and signed a three-year entry-level contract on July 13. Following the draft, Stars General Managaer Jim Nill said "[t]his is his third, fourth year of junior. We all knew about him. He's been drafted. We knew about the situation...He's a good player and the nice thing is we can turn him pro right away, put him in Austin and go from there."

After attending the Stars' development camp, Mascherin was reassigned to their American Hockey League (AHL) affiliate, the Texas Stars. While playing with the team, he recorded his first professional goal on October 12, 2018, in a 4–3 shootout win against the Iowa Wild. On November 25, Mascherin recorded a first period hat-trick in an eventual 7–3 win over the San Antonio Rampage. Following the hat trick game, he was moved up to the top line with Denis Gurianov and Justin Dowling.

Mascherin was limited to only 30 games during the 2019–20 season, finishing with four goals and seven points. He suffered an injury during a fight on December 28 and missed 13 months of hockey both due to recovery and the COVID-19 pandemic.

After attending the Stars' training camp prior to the 2020–21 season, Mascherin was reassigned to the AHL. Upon re-joining the team, Mascherin recorded 11 goals and 23 points by March and was tied for second in the league in points and goals. In the same month, during a loss against the Iowa Wild, Mascherin set a new franchise record for most shots on goal during a game with 12.

== Career statistics ==
=== Regular season and playoffs ===
			Regular season					Playoffs
Season	Team	League	GP	G	A	Pts	PIM	GP	G	A	Pts	PIM
2013–14	Georgetown Raiders	OJHL	5	5	7	12	0	11	6	2	8	0
2014–15	Kitchener Rangers	OHL	62	12	17	29	18	6	1	1	2	4
2015–16	Kitchener Rangers	OHL	65	35	46	81	16	9	6	6	12	0
2016–17	Kitchener Rangers	OHL	65	35	65	100	20	5	1	3	4	2
2017–18	Kitchener Rangers	OHL	67	40	46	86	20	19	9	15	24	16
2018–19	Texas Stars	AHL	75	18	26	44	30	—	—	—	—	—
2019–20	Texas Stars	AHL	30	4	7	11	21	—	—	—	—	—
2020–21	Texas Stars	AHL	37	18	16	34	14	—	—	—	—	—
2021–22	Skellefteå AIK	SHL	15	7	1	8	27	—	—	—	—	—
2022–23	Skellefteå AIK	SHL	16	0	1	1	4	—	—	—	—	—
AHL totals			142	40	49	89	65	—	—	—	—	—
SHL totals			31	7	2	9	31	—	—	—	—	—

=== International ===
Year	Team	Event	Result	GP	G	A	Pts	PIM
2014	Canada Red	U17	6th	5	2	1	3	4
Junior totals				5	2	1	3	4
