= Joey Keane =

American ice hockey player (born 1999)

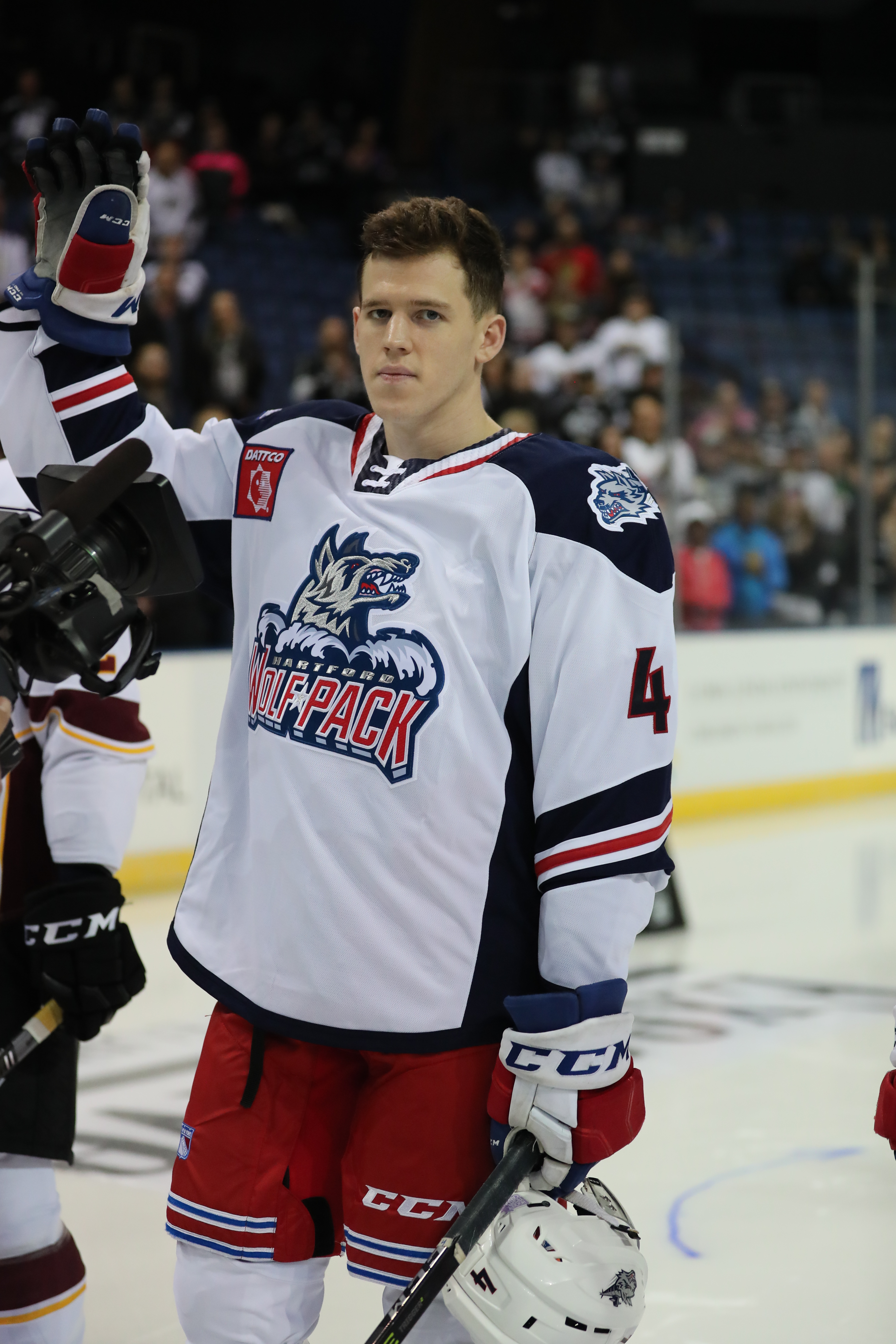
- Keane with the Hartford Wolf Pack in 2020
- Born: July 2, 1999 (age 27) Chicago, Illinois, U.S.
- Height: 6 ft 0 in (183 cm)
- Weight: 185 lb (84 kg; 13 st 3 lb)
- Position: Defense
- Shoots: Right
- KHL team Former teams: Spartak Moscow; Carolina Hurricanes
- NHL draft: 88th overall, 2018; New York Rangers
- Playing career: 2019–present

Joey Keane (born July 2, 1999) is an American professional ice hockey defenseman for HC Spartak Moscow of the Kontinental Hockey League (KHL). He was selected by the New York Rangers in the third round (88th overall) of the 2018 NHL entry draft.

== Playing career ==
Keane started his junior hockey career for the Barrie Colts of the Ontario Hockey League. He played for Barrie for 2 1/2 seasons and was traded to the London Knights partway through his final junior season of 2018–19. He was selected to the OHL Third All-Star Team for Barrie for the 2017–18 season.

He made his professional debut for the Hartford Wolf Pack of the American Hockey League (AHL) in the 2019–20 season. As an AHL rookie he was selected for the 2020 AHL All-Star Challenge. He was called up to the Rangers on February 14, 2020, after posting 8 goals and 20 assists in 48 games with Hartford. He was returned to Hartford after not playing in the Rangers' game that day. On February 18, 2020, Keane was traded to the Carolina Hurricanes in exchange for Julien Gauthier.

As a restricted free agent after his contract with the Hurricanes, Keane opted to move abroad in agreeing to a one-year contract for the 2022–23 season with Russian club HC Spartak Moscow of the KHL, on July 25, 2022.

After two seasons with HC Spartak Moscow, where he scored 35 points in 102 games, Keane returned to the United States and signed a professional try-out agreement with the San Jose Sharks on September 19, 2024. On September 27, 2024, Keane was assigned to the Sharks' AHL affiliate San Jose Barracuda. In the 2024–25 season, Keane was unable to replicate his offensive prowess from the KHL, limited to just 38 regular season games through injury and contributing with 11 points.

As a free agent, Keane opted to return the KHL and former club Spartak Moscow, agreeing to a two-year contract on July 15, 2025.

== Career statistics ==
=== Regular season and playoffs ===
			Regular season					Playoffs
Season	Team	League	GP	G	A	Pts	PIM	GP	G	A	Pts	PIM
2015–16	Dubuque Fighting Saints	USHL	55	2	9	11	51	12	1	1	2	2
2016–17	Barrie Colts	OHL	67	1	18	19	61	—	—	—	—	—
2017–18	Barrie Colts	OHL	62	12	32	44	52	12	0	7	7	8
2018–19	Barrie Colts	OHL	29	4	16	20	46	—	—	—	—	—
2018–19	London Knights	OHL	37	4	15	19	57	11	0	5	5	6
2019–20	Hartford Wolf Pack	AHL	49	8	22	30	32	—	—	—	—	—
2019–20	Charlotte Checkers	AHL	9	1	6	7	4	—	—	—	—	—
2020–21	Chicago Wolves	AHL	24	0	13	13	35	—	—	—	—	—
2020–21	Carolina Hurricanes	NHL	1	0	0	0	0	—	—	—	—	—
2021–22	Chicago Wolves	AHL	62	7	26	33	81	18	1	11	12	32
2021–22	Carolina Hurricanes	NHL	1	0	0	0	2	—	—	—	—	—
2022–23	Spartak Moscow	KHL	64	6	18	24	75	—	—	—	—	—
2023–24	Spartak Moscow	KHL	38	4	7	11	24	6	0	0	0	0
2024–25	San Jose Barracuda	AHL	38	2	9	11	24	2	0	0	0	2
2025–26	Spartak Moscow	KHL	60	9	30	39	44	3	0	0	0	0
NHL totals			2	0	0	0	2	—	—	—	—	—
KHL totals			162	19	45	74	143	9	0	0	0	0

=== International ===
Year	Team	Event	Result	GP	G	A	Pts	PIM
2016	United States	IH18	2nd place, silver medalist(s)	4	0	0	0	10
Junior totals				4	0	0	0	10

== Awards and honors ==
Award	Year
OHL
Third All-Star Team	2018
AHL
All-Star Game	2020
All-Rookie Team	2020
Calder Cup (Chicago Wolves)	2022
