= Riley Damiani =

Canadian ice hockey player (born 2000)

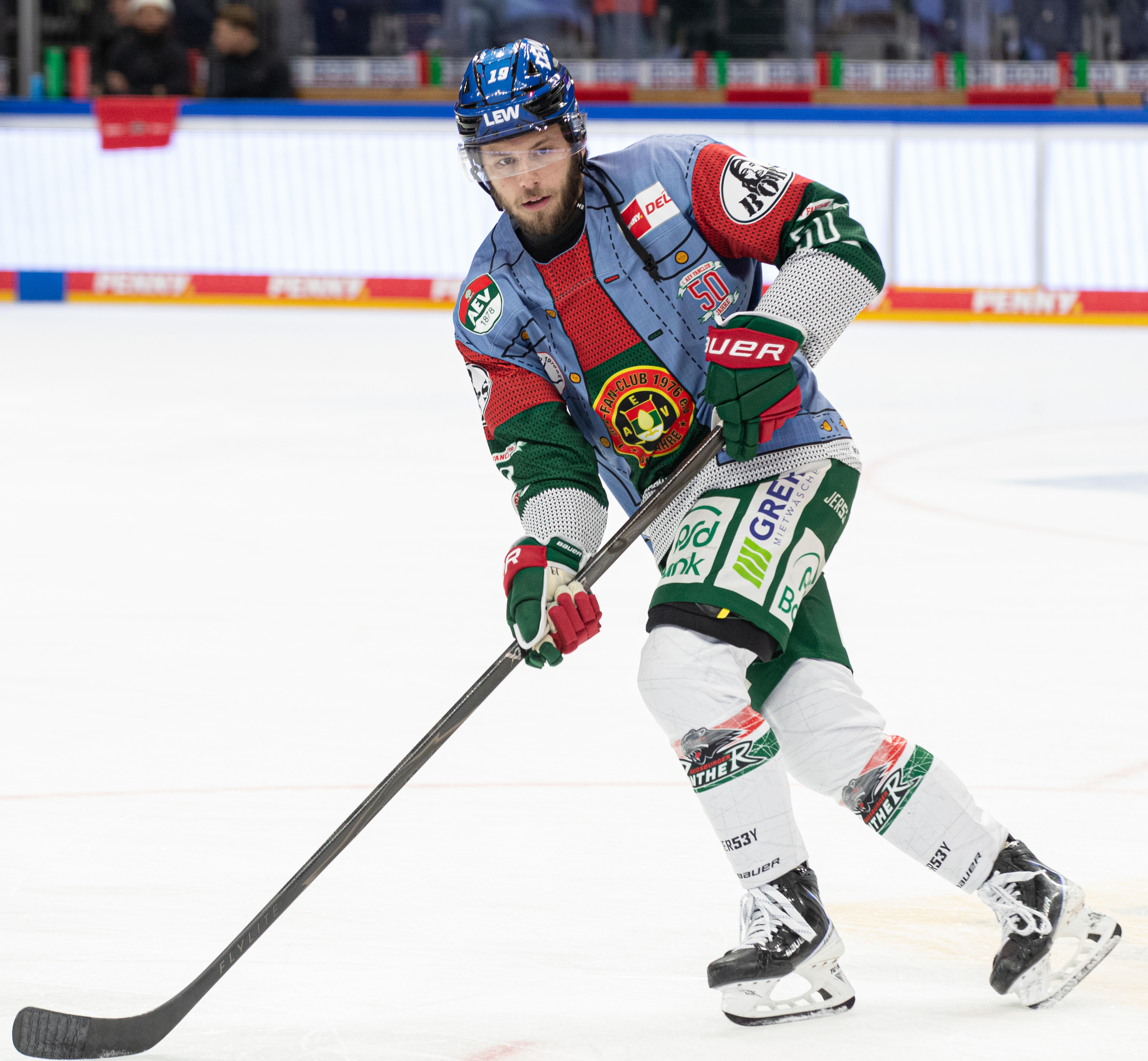
- Born: March 20, 2000 (age 26) Mississauga, Ontario, Canada
- Height: 5 ft 10 in (178 cm)
- Weight: 170 lb (77 kg; 12 st 2 lb)
- Position: Centre
- Shoots: Right
- DEL team Former teams: Augsburger Panther; Dallas Stars
- NHL draft: 137th overall, 2018; Dallas Stars
- Playing career: 2019–present

Riley Damiani (born March 20, 2000) is a Canadian professional ice hockey forward who is currently under contract with Augsburger Panther of the Deutsche Eishockey Liga (DEL).

== Early life ==
Damiani was born on March 20, 2000, in Mississauga, Ontario, Canada to parents Rino and Jennifer. He is the middle of three brothers. As his father Rino grew up alongside Raami Durzi, Damiani was childhood friend with defenceman Sean Durzi. They played together with the Mississauga Rebels before joining the Ontario Hockey League (OHL).

== Playing career ==
Growing up in Mississauga, Damiani played minor midget hockey with the Mississauga Rebels of the Greater Toronto Hockey League (GTHL) before joining the OHL. While with the Rebels during the 2015–16 regular season, Damiani registered 34 goals and 41 assists for 75 points through 71 games. He also tallied two assists to help the GTHL Blue team win the 2016 OHL Gold Cup. As a result, Damiani was drafted 29th overall by the Kitchener Rangers in the 2016 OHL Priority Selection.

=== Major junior ===
Upon joining the Rangers for the 2016–17 season, Damiani was chosen to represent Team Canada Red at the 2016 World U-17 Hockey Challenge. He then tallied his first major junior goal in a 9–3 win over the Sudbury Wolves on October 2, 2016. Following the 2016–17 season, Damiani was awarded the Jim McGeachie Memorial Award for Outstanding Team Effort and the Les Bradley Award for Most Improved Player.

Damiani returned to the Rangers for the 2017–18 season where he set new career highs in goals, assists, points, power-play goals, shorthanded goals, and game-winning goals. By December 2017, Damiani surpassed his goal total from his rookie season and nearly beat his previous season's point total. As a result of his offensive abilities, Damiani was listed by the NHL Central Scouting Bureau on their Midterm Rankings among North American Skaters. He helped push the Rangers to a playoff berth although they were eliminated in Game 7 of the Western Conference Final by the Sault Ste. Marie Greyhounds. Following their elimination, Damiani was selected by the Dallas Stars in the fifth-round, 137th overall, of the 2018 NHL entry draft.

Damiani began the 2018–19 OHL season strong by centring the Rangers' top line and playing on their power play and penalty kills. On December 11, 2018, Damiani was suspended for five games after he flipped a puck into the crowd following the Kingston Frontenacs empty-net goal. Following the suspension, Damiani registered his second straight four-point game, including scoring the opening goal within 33 seconds. Later that season, he tallied a hat-trick in a 6–3 win over the Erie Otters on March 14, 2019. Damiani subsequently finished the season with a career-best 85 points while scoring on 29% of the Rangers' power plays. His play earned him numerous team awards including being named the co-winner of the teams' Most Valuable Player Award and their Three-Star Award.

Prior to the start of the 2019–20 season, Damiani participated in his second Dallas Stars Development Camp and was invited to Hockey Canada's World Junior Summer Development Camp. While attending the Stars' Development Camp, player development coordinator Rich Peverley praised his passing ability and shot blockings. Upon returning to the OHL, Damiani was named co-captain of the Rangers alongside Greg Meireles. Damiani began the season strong and tallied a hat-trick on October 4, 2019, against the Owen Sound Attack. He continued to produce offensively and was selected to partake in Game 3 of the CHL Canada/Russia Series as a member of Team OHL.

=== Professional ===
On April 1, 2019, Damiani signed a three-year, entry-level contract with the Stars and an amateur tryout agreement with their American Hockey League (AHL) affiliate, the Texas Stars, for the remainder of the 2018–19 season. He then began his first full professional season in 2021 with the Texas Stars. As a rookie, he registered a team leading 25 assists and 36 points through 36 regular season games and was selected to the AHL's All-Rookie Team. He was awarded the Dudley "Red" Garrett Memorial Award as the AHL's Rookie of the Year.

Damiani remained with the Texas Stars in the following 2021–22 season, posting 18 points through 21 games before receiving his first recall to Dallas on December 14, 2021. He made his NHL debut that night, scoring his first NHL goal, in a 4–1 defeat to the St. Louis Blues.

During the 2023–24 season, on March 7, 2024, Damiani was traded to the Calgary Flames in exchange for Mathias Emilio Pettersen. He was assigned to continue in the AHL with the Flames affiliate, the Calgary Wranglers, and played out the remainder of his contract with the club.

As a free agent from the Flames, Damiani opted to sign his first contract abroad in agreeing to a one-year contract with German club, Augsburger Panther of the DEL, on July 10, 2024.

== Career statistics ==
=== Regular season and playoffs ===
			Regular season					Playoffs
Season	Team	League	GP	G	A	Pts	PIM	GP	G	A	Pts	PIM
2015–16	Georgetown Raiders	OJHL	4	2	1	3	0	1	0	0	0	0
2016–17	Kitchener Rangers	OHL	62	9	13	22	29	5	1	1	2	6
2017–18	Kitchener Rangers	OHL	64	19	18	37	38	19	5	7	12	10
2018–19	Kitchener Rangers	OHL	58	30	55	85	27	4	0	1	1	4
2018–19	Texas Stars	AHL	1	0	0	0	0	—	—	—	—	—
2019–20	Kitchener Rangers	OHL	61	28	50	78	32	—	—	—	—	—
2020–21	Texas Stars	AHL	36	11	25	36	18	—	—	—	—	—
2021–22	Texas Stars	AHL	55	13	23	36	42	2	0	0	0	0
2021–22	Dallas Stars	NHL	7	1	1	2	2	—	—	—	—	—
2022–23	Texas Stars	AHL	59	13	18	31	28	6	2	1	3	2
2023–24	Texas Stars	AHL	53	10	13	23	34	—	—	—	—	—
2023–24	Calgary Wranglers	AHL	14	1	0	1	2	6	1	0	1	4
2024–25	Augsburger Panther	DEL	15	3	6	9	49	—	—	—	—	—
NHL totals			7	1	1	2	2	—	—	—	—	—

=== International ===
Year	Team	Event	Result	GP	G	A	Pts	PIM
2016	Canada Red	U17	6th	5	1	2	3	14
Junior totals				5	1	2	3	14

== Awards and honours ==
Award	Year	Ref
AHL
Central Division All-Star Team	2021	
All-Rookie Team	2021	
Dudley "Red" Garrett Memorial Award	2021	
