= Tyler Tucker =

Canadian ice hockey player (born 2000)

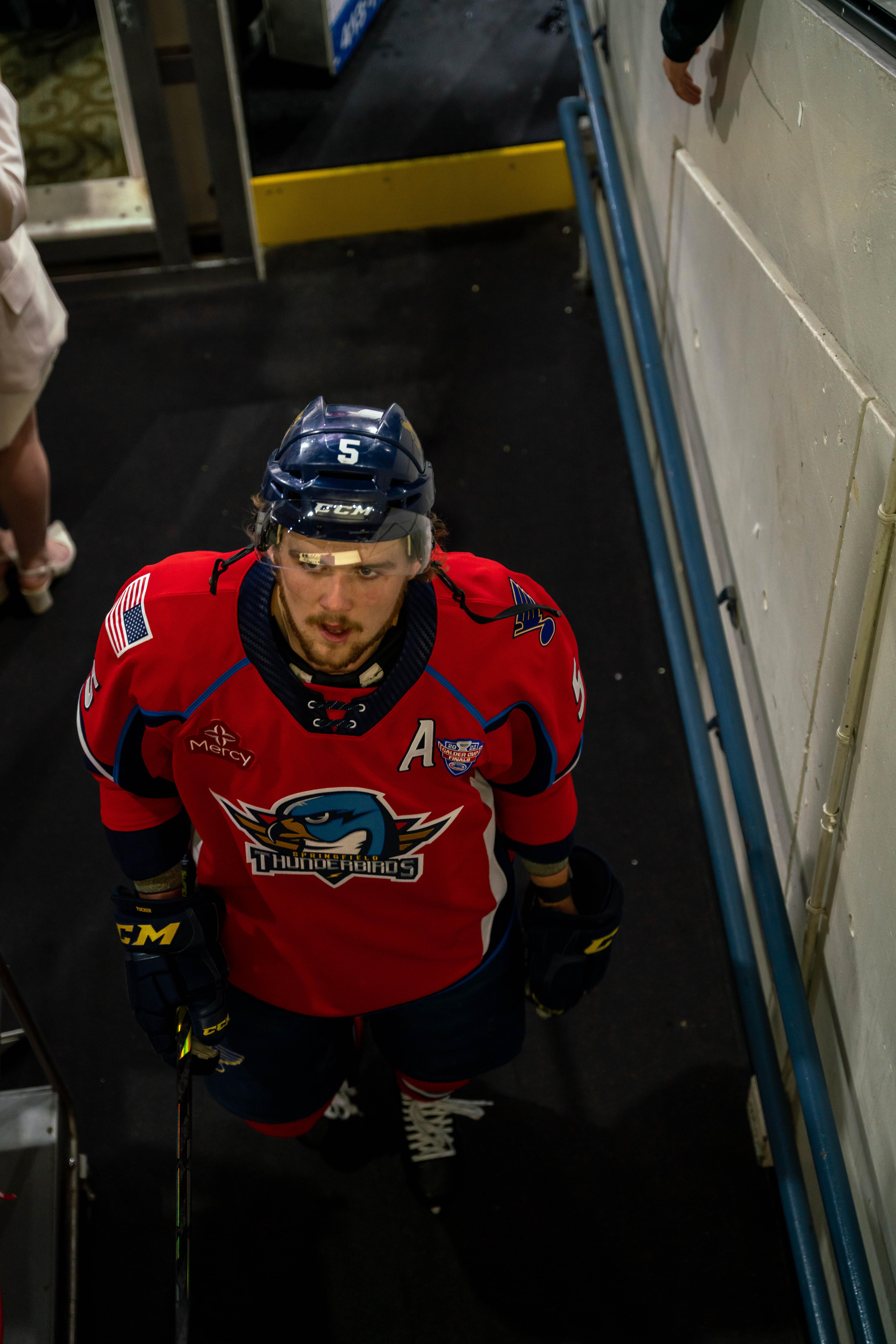
- Born: March 1, 2000 (age 26) Thunder Bay, Ontario, Canada
- Height: 6 ft 2 in (188 cm)
- Weight: 205 lb (93 kg; 14 st 9 lb)
- Position: Defence
- Shoots: Left
- NHL team: St. Louis Blues
- NHL draft: 200th overall, 2018; St. Louis Blues
- Playing career: 2019–present

Tyler Tucker (born March 1, 2000) is a Canadian professional ice hockey player who is a defenceman for the St. Louis Blues in the National Hockey League (NHL). He was selected by the Blues in the seventh round, 200th overall, of the 2018 NHL entry draft.

== Playing career ==
Tucker played major junior hockey with the Barrie Colts in the Ontario Hockey League (OHL) before he was selected in his first year of eligibility in the 2018 NHL entry draft by the St. Louis Blues, 200th overall. He made his professional debut at conclusion of the 2018–19 season, signing an amateur tryout with the Blues then AHL affiliate, the San Antonio Rampage, on April 7, 2019.

During his final season of major junior hockey in 2019–20, Tucker was traded by the Colts to the Flint Firebirds on January 7, 2020. He finished with a career best 17 goals in a combined 55 regular season games before the playoffs were cancelled due to the COVID-19 pandemic.

On March 3, 2020, Tucker was signed by the St. Louis Blues to a three-year, entry-level contract. Embarking on his first professional season, Tucker was eventually assigned to the Blues temporary AHL affiliate, the Utica Comets, for the pandemic-shortened 2020–21 season. He registered 7 points through 27 appearances with the Comets.

Approaching the final season of his entry-level contract in 2022–23, Tucker was reassigned to continue his second season with the Springfield Thunderbirds in the AHL. After contributing with 7 points through his first 11 games, Tucker was recalled by the Blues and later made his NHL debut on St. Louis' third-pairing in a 5–2 victory over the Chicago Blackhawks on November 16, 2022.

== Personal life ==
Tyler has a twin brother, Jesse, who plays in the ECHL with the Indy Fuel.

== Career statistics ==
			Regular season					Playoffs
Season	Team	League	GP	G	A	Pts	PIM	GP	G	A	Pts	PIM
2015–16	Newmarket Hurricanes	OJHL	2	0	0	0	2	2	0	0	0	0
2016–17	Barrie Colts	OHL	62	1	13	14	51	—	—	—	—	—
2017–18	Barrie Colts	OHL	59	3	20	23	87	12	3	3	6	10
2018–19	Barrie Colts	OHL	68	14	45	59	105	—	—	—	—	—
2018–19	San Antonio Rampage	AHL	2	0	0	0	0	—	—	—	—	—
2019–20	Barrie Colts	OHL	28	8	21	29	43	—	—	—	—	—
2019–20	Flint Firebirds	OHL	27	9	18	27	44	—	—	—	—	—
2020–21	Utica Comets	AHL	27	1	6	7	34	—	—	—	—	—
2021–22	Springfield Thunderbirds	AHL	72	3	15	18	114	18	1	1	2	20
2022–23	Springfield Thunderbirds	AHL	41	3	18	21	79	2	0	0	0	2
2022–23	St. Louis Blues	NHL	26	1	3	4	31	—	—	—	—	—
2023–24	St. Louis Blues	NHL	26	1	1	2	42	—	—	—	—	—
2023–24	Springfield Thunderbirds	AHL	6	0	0	0	6	—	—	—	—	—
2024–25	Springfield Thunderbirds	AHL	19	4	6	10	39	—	—	—	—	—
2024–25	St. Louis Blues	NHL	38	3	4	7	55	3	1	0	1	4
2025–26	St. Louis Blues	NHL	69	3	14	17	81	—	—	—	—	—
NHL totals			159	8	22	30	209	3	1	0	1	4
