= Cameron Hillis =

Canadian ice hockey player (born 2000)

- Born: June 24, 2000 (age 26) Oshawa, Ontario, Canada
- Height: 5 ft 10 in (178 cm)
- Weight: 189 lb (86 kg; 13 st 7 lb)
- Position: Center
- Shoots: Right
- Liiga team Former teams: Kiekko-Espoo; Montreal Canadiens
- NHL draft: 66th overall, 2018; Montreal Canadiens
- Playing career: 2021–present

Cameron Hillis (born June 24, 2000) is a Canadian professional ice hockey forward for Kiekko-Espoo in the Liiga. He was selected in the third round, 66th overall, by the Montreal Canadiens in the 2018 NHL entry draft.

== Playing career ==
Hillis played Canadian High School hockey with St. Andrew's College and also featured in the Conference of Independent Schools Athletic Association league. He was selected 28th overall in the 2016 Priority Selection Draft by the Guelph Storm and was later committed to join the major junior club for the 2017–18 season.

In his rookie season with the Storm, Hillis lead the league in assists among rookies with 39 and added 20 goals to finish with 59 points through 60 games to earn a selection to the OHL First All-Rookie Team. He was later selected in the third-round, 66th overall, by the Montreal Canadiens in the 2018 NHL entry draft.

Following a successful three season junior career with the Storm, claiming the OHL championship in the 2018–19 season, Hillis was signed to a three-year, entry-level contract with the Montreal Canadiens on May 13, 2020.

In turning pro, Hillis appeared in the pandemic shortened 2020–21 season with the Canadiens American Hockey League (AHL) affiliate, the Laval Rocket. He was limited to just 18 games, registering a goal.

In the following 2021–22 season, Hillis began the season assigned to the Canadiens secondary affiliate, the Trois-Rivières Lions in the ECHL, before continuing his tenure with the Laval Rocket in the AHL. On December 27, 2021, with the Canadiens suffering a spate of injury and covid-related absences, Hillis was added to the taxi squad. He made his NHL debut with the Canadiens on January 1, 2022, featuring on the fourth-line in a 5–2 defeat against the Florida Panthers. After his solitary game with Montreal, he was later returned to the minor leagues for the remainder of the campaign.

Entering the final season of his entry-level contract, Hillis for a second consecutive year was assigned to begin the 2022–23 season in the ECHL with the Trois-Rivières Lions. Hillis contributed with 2 goals in 3 games with the Lions before he was traded by the Canadiens to the Chicago Blackhawks in exchange for Nicolas Beaudin on October 26, 2022. He was immediately reassigned by the Blackhawks to join AHL affiliate, the Rockford Icehogs.

Leaving the Blackhawks at the conclusion of his contract, Hillis remained un-signed over the summer. On August 29, 2023, he was signed to a professional tryout contract to attend the 2023 training camp of the Detroit Red Wings. At the completion of training camp, Hillis was among the first cuts and was released from his tryout with the Red Wings on September 25, 2023.

Following his fourth North American professional season, Hillis opted to pursue a career abroad, agreeing to a one-year contract with Finnish club, Kiekko-Espoo of the Liiga, on July 30, 2024.

== Career statistics ==
=== Regular season and playoffs ===
			Regular season					Playoffs
Season	Team	League	GP	G	A	Pts	PIM	GP	G	A	Pts	PIM
2015–16	St. Andrew's College	CAHS	7	1	1	2	2	—	—	—	—	—
2016–17	St. Andrew's College	CAHS	58	28	49	77	42	—	—	—	—	—
2017–18	Guelph Storm	OHL	60	20	39	59	48	6	1	2	3	2
2018–19	Guelph Storm	OHL	33	10	12	22	27	2	0	0	0	2
2019–20	Guelph Storm	OHL	62	24	59	83	43	—	—	—	—	—
2020–21	Laval Rocket	AHL	18	1	0	1	2	—	—	—	—	—
2021–22	Trois-Rivières Lions	ECHL	14	3	6	9	10	—	—	—	—	—
2021–22	Laval Rocket	AHL	24	5	4	9	14	—	—	—	—	—
2021–22	Montreal Canadiens	NHL	1	0	0	0	0	—	—	—	—	—
2022–23	Trois-Rivières Lions	ECHL	3	2	0	2	0	—	—	—	—	—
2022–23	Indy Fuel	ECHL	45	14	36	50	34	2	0	1	1	2
2022–23	Rockford IceHogs	AHL	18	0	2	2	4	—	—	—	—	—
2023–24	Indy Fuel	ECHL	54	18	43	61	66	—	—	—	—	—
2023–24	Hartford Wolf Pack	AHL	5	0	1	1	2	—	—	—	—	—
NHL totals			1	0	0	0	0	—	—	—	—	—

=== International ===
Year	Team	Event	Result	GP	G	A	Pts	PIM
2016	Canada Red	U17	6th	5	0	0	0	2
2018	Canada	U18	5th	5	0	2	2	12
Junior totals				10	0	2	2	14

== Awards and honours ==
Award	Year
OHL
First All-Rookie Team	2018
J. Ross Robertson Cup (Guelph Storm)	2019
