= Kaden Fulcher =

Ice hockey goaltender

- Born: September 23, 1998 (age 27) Brigden, Ontario, Canada
- Height: 6 ft 3 in (191 cm)
- Weight: 183 lb (83 kg; 13 st 1 lb)
- Position: Goaltender
- Catches: Left
- OSHL team Former teams: Alvinston Killer Bees; Detroit Red Wings
- NHL draft: Undrafted
- Playing career: 2019–present

Kaden Fulcher (born September 23, 1998) is a Canadian professional ice hockey goaltender for the Alvinston Killer Bees of the OSHL. He has formerly played with the Detroit Red Wings of the National Hockey League (NHL).

== Playing career ==
=== Junior ===
Fulcher was drafted 241st overall by the Sarnia Sting in the 2014 OHL Priority Selection. During the 2015–16 season, Fulcher began the season with the Sarnia Sting, where he posted a 2–0–1 record in three games, with a 3.30 goals-against average (GAA) and .890 save percentage. On January 7, 2016, he was traded to the Hamilton Bulldogs in exchange for goaltender Charlie Graham. He finished the season with a 4–10 record, with a 4.48 GAA and .876 save percentage in 14 games for the Bulldogs.

During the 2017–18 season, Fulcher posted a 32–17–6 regular-season record for the Hamilton Bulldogs, with a 2.86 GAA and .899 save percentage. On March 1, 2018, Fulcher won his 30th game of the season, setting a single-season franchise record for the most wins. During the playoffs he posted a 16–5 record, with a 2.70 GAA and .905 save percentage to help the Bulldogs win the J. Ross Robertson Cup, their first championship in franchise history. With the win, the Bulldogs advanced to the 2018 Memorial Cup, where Fulcher posted a 2–2 record with a 2.27 GAA and a .918 save percentage. Following the tournament, he was awarded the Hap Emms Memorial Trophy as the tournament's most outstanding goaltender.

=== Professional ===
On October 3, 2017, the Detroit Red Wings signed Fulcher to a three-year, entry-level contract. Following a championship winning season in junior hockey, Fulcher was assigned to the Toledo Walleye of the ECHL on September 27, 2018. During the 2018–19 season, Fulcher posted a 15–7–6 record with a 3.00 GAA and a .899 save percentage in 28 games for the Walleye in his first professional season. On March 3, 2019, Fulcher posted his first career shutout, in a 5–0 victory over the Indy Fuel.

On March 31, 2019, Fulcher was recalled by the Red Wings under emergency conditions. On April 6, he made his NHL debut for the Red Wings in a game against the Buffalo Sabres, replacing an injured Jimmy Howard in the second period, making nine saves on 11 shots in 28 minutes. Following the completion of the Red Wings' season, Fulcher was re-assigned to the Walleye the next day and added to their playoff roster.

On January 12, 2021, the Red Wings assigned Fulcher to the Grand Rapids Griffins of the American Hockey League (AHL).

As a free agent from the Red Wings, following four seasons within the organization, Fulcher remained un-signed leading into the 2022–23 season. He returned to the professional ranks on December 17, 2022, in signing a contract with ECHL club, the Reading Royals. After making his debut with the Royals, Fulcher was soon loaned to AHL club, the Syracuse Crunch, in January 2023.

Continuing his career, Fulcher signed with the ECHL's Idaho Steelheads on September 19, 2023; however, he was released from his contract on October 18, and instead signed with the Pensacola Ice Flyers of the SPHL on October 23. Soon after, Fulcher returned to the ECHL, as the Ice Flyers loaned him to the Savannah Ghost Pirates on November 22.

Fulcher was traded to the Worcester Railers in the end of December 2023 from the Savannah Ghost Pirates in exchange for cash considerations. Fulcher played a total of five games during his short stint in Savannah, collecting a .893 save percentage, a 3.78 goals against average, and an 0-4-0 record.

== Career statistics ==
			Regular season									Playoffs
Season	Team	League	GP	W	L	T/OT	MIN	GA	SO	GAA	SV%	GP	W	L	MIN	GA	SO	GAA	SV%
2015–16	Sarnia Sting	OHL	3	2	0	1	182	10	0	3.30	.890	—	—	—	—	—	—	—	—
2015–16	Hamilton Bulldogs	OHL	14	4	10	0	764	57	0	4.48	.876	—	—	—	—	—	—	—	—
2016–17	Hamilton Bulldogs	OHL	43	19	17	3	2,393	128	2	3.21	.891	—	—	—	—	—	—	—	—
2017–18	Hamilton Bulldogs	OHL	55	32	17	2	3,207	153	3	2.86	.899	—	—	—	—	—	—	—	—
2018–19	Toledo Walleye	ECHL	28	15	7	2	1,642	82	1	3.00	.899	—	—	—	—	—	—	—	—
2018–19	Detroit Red Wings	NHL	1	0	0	0	28	2	0	4.44	.818	—	—	—	—	—	—	—	—
2019–20	Toledo Walleye	ECHL	2	0	2	0	120	11	0	5.51	.831	—	—	—	—	—	—	—	—
2020–21	Grand Rapids Griffins	AHL	7	2	2	2	380	18	1	2.84	.905	—	—	—	—	—	—	—	—
2021–22	Toledo Walleye	ECHL	19	10	7	0	1074	44	2	2.46	.912	—	—	—	—	—	—	—	—
2021–22	Grand Rapids Griffins	AHL	4	1	3	0	217	16	0	4.42	.846	—	—	—	—	—	—	—	—
2022–23	Reading Royals	ECHL	9	4	5	0	534	27	0	3.03	.897	1	0	0	35	1	0	1.70	.933
2022–23	Syracuse Crunch	AHL	1	0	0	1	60	3	0	2.99	.906	—	—	—	—	—	—	—	—
NHL totals			1	0	0	0	28	2	0	4.44	.818	—	—	—	—	—	—	—	—

== See also ==
- List of players who played only one game in the NHL
