= Tim Gettinger =

American ice hockey player (born 1998)

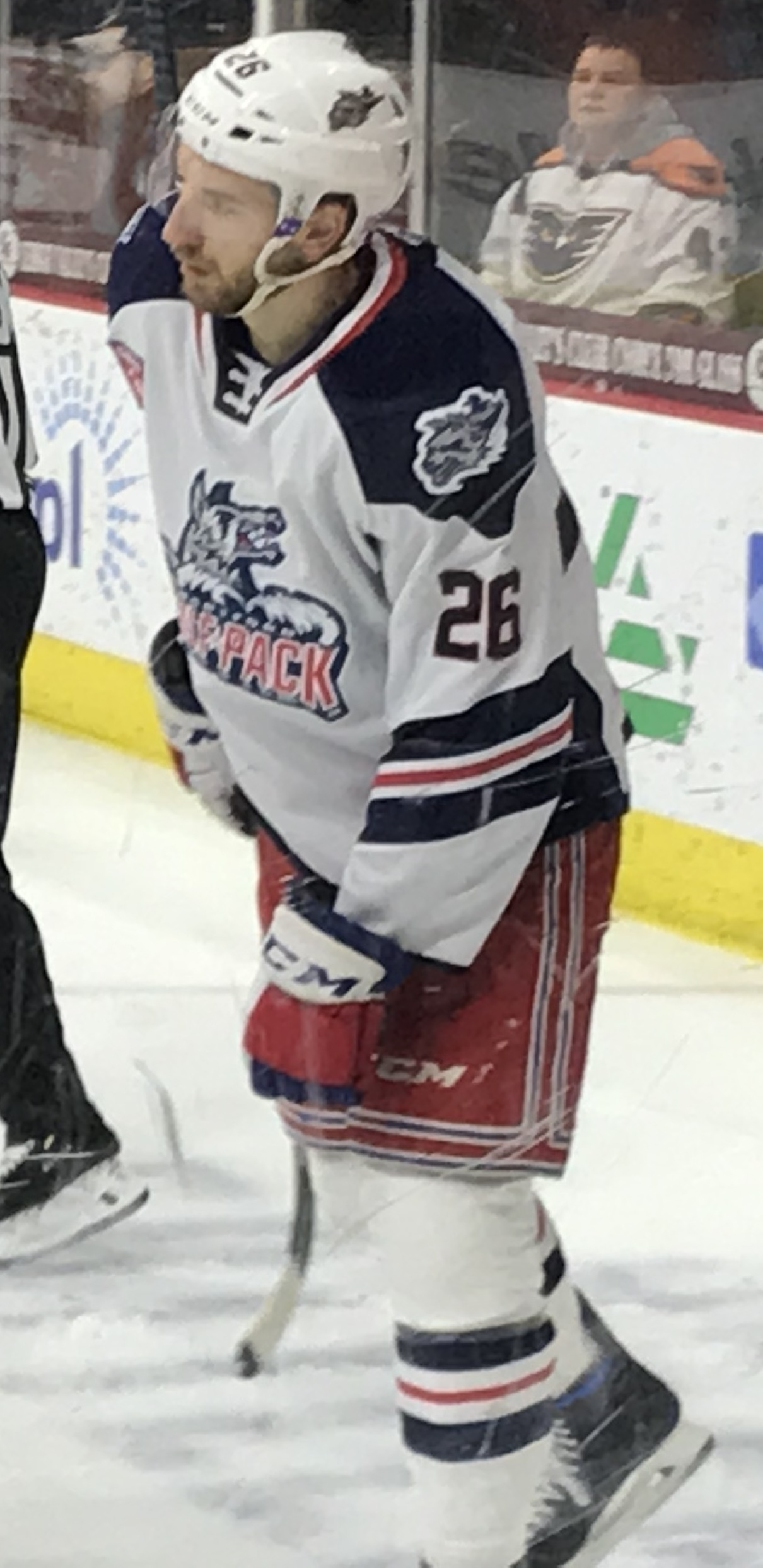
- Gettinger with the Hartford Wolf Pack in 2019
- Born: April 14, 1998 (age 28) North Olmsted, Ohio, U.S.
- Height: 6 ft 6 in (198 cm)
- Weight: 222 lb (101 kg; 15 st 12 lb)
- Position: Forward
- Shoots: Left
- EIHL team Former teams: Sheffield Steelers; New York Rangers; Schwenninger Wild Wings
- NHL draft: 141st overall, 2016; New York Rangers
- Playing career: 2018–present

Timothy Gettinger (born April 14, 1998) is an American professional ice hockey forward for Sheffield Steelers of the Elite Ice Hockey League (EIHL). He was selected by the New York Rangers in the fifth round, 141st overall, in the 2016 NHL entry draft. He had served as captain for the Sault Ste. Marie Greyhounds of the Ontario Hockey League (OHL).

== Playing career ==
Gettinger first played midget hockey in Cleveland with the Barons. In his first season with the Sault Ste. Marie Greyhounds of the Ontario Hockey League (OHL) in the 2014–15 season, Gettinger scored 10 goals. In the second season with the Greyhounds, his totals improved to 17 goals and 39 points in 60 games for the 2015–16 season.

On June 24, 2016, Gettinger was selected 141st overall by the New York Rangers during the 2016 NHL entry draft. Gettinger entered the draft as the 65th-ranked prospect.

On March 16, 2017, the Rangers signed Gettinger to a three-year, entry-level contract.

On October 12, 2017, Gettinger was named captain of the Sault Ste. Marie Greyhounds.

Gettinger began the 2018–19 season with the Hartford Wolf Pack of the American Hockey League (AHL). He was recalled by the Rangers due to an injury to forward Mats Zuccarello on November 23, 2018, and played his first NHL game the next day with the Rangers. He was returned to Harford after playing one game, only to be recalled the next day.

On July 22, 2022, Gettinger was re-signed to a one-year, two-way contract extension with the Rangers for the 2022–23 season. He recorded 13 goals and 22 assists in 52 games with the Hartford Wolf Pack of the AHL.

On July 1, 2023, Gettinger signed a one-year, two-way contract with the Detroit Red Wings. On March 11, 2024, the Red Wings re-signed Gettinger to a one-year, two-way contract extension.

At the conclusion of his contract with the Red Wings, having played seven seasons in North America, Gettinger opted to sign abroad in agreeing to a one-year contract with German club, Schwenninger Wild Wings of the DEL, on 30 July 2025.

On 1 August 2026, Gettinger signed with Sheffield Steelers of the Elite Ice Hockey League.

== Career statistics ==
=== Regular season and playoffs ===
			Regular season					Playoffs
Season	Team	League	GP	G	A	Pts	PIM	GP	G	A	Pts	PIM
2014–15	Sault Ste. Marie Greyhounds	OHL	54	10	15	25	13	6	1	1	2	2
2015–16	Sault Ste. Marie Greyhounds	OHL	60	17	22	39	32	12	1	3	4	0
2016–17	Sault Ste. Marie Greyhounds	OHL	62	31	23	54	27	11	4	3	7	0
2017–18	Sault Ste. Marie Greyhounds	OHL	63	33	36	69	53	24	7	15	22	4
2018–19	Hartford Wolf Pack	AHL	64	14	13	27	27	—	—	—	—	—
2018–19	New York Rangers	NHL	4	0	0	0	0	—	—	—	—	—
2019–20	Hartford Wolf Pack	AHL	53	16	11	27	14	—	—	—	—	—
2019–20	New York Rangers	NHL	2	0	1	1	0	—	—	—	—	—
2020–21	Hartford Wolf Pack	AHL	23	9	10	19	20	—	—	—	—	—
2020–21	New York Rangers	NHL	2	0	0	0	0	—	—	—	—	—
2021–22	Hartford Wolf Pack	AHL	45	10	15	25	39	—	—	—	—	—
2021–22	New York Rangers	NHL	8	0	0	0	0	—	—	—	—	—
2022–23	Hartford Wolf Pack	AHL	52	13	22	35	26	9	2	6	8	7
2023–24	Grand Rapids Griffins	AHL	55	12	13	25	20	8	0	0	0	0
2024–25	Grand Rapids Griffins	AHL	54	7	9	16	19	3	0	1	1	0
2025–26	Schwenninger Wild Wings	DEL	30	5	2	7	6	6	0	1	1	0
NHL totals			16	0	1	1	0	—	—	—	—	—

=== International ===
Year	Team	Event	Result	GP	G	A	Pts	PIM
2015	United States	IH18	5th	4	2	2	4	30
Junior totals				4	2	2	4	30
