= Nick Caamano =

Canadian ice hockey player (born 1998)

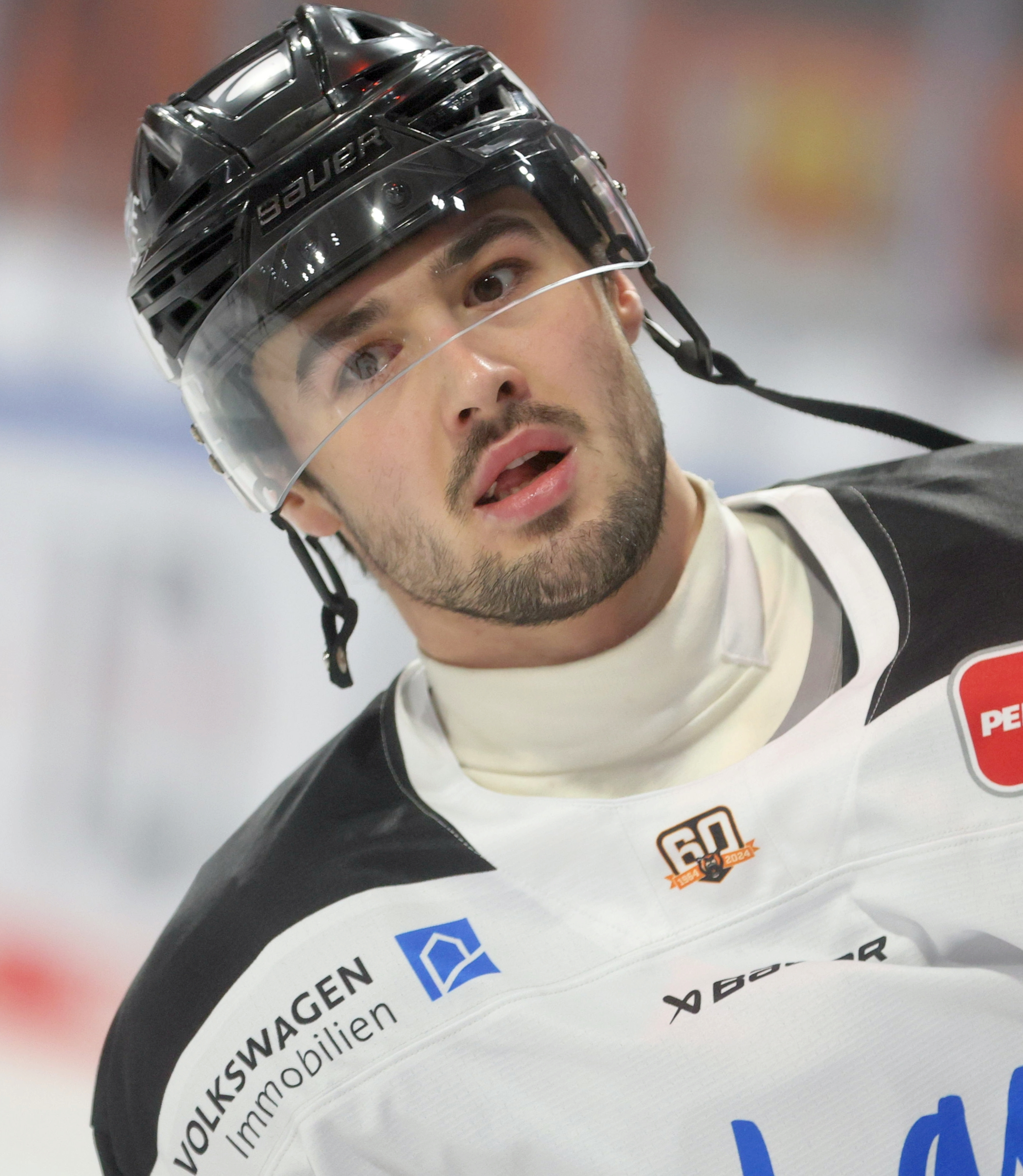
- Born: September 7, 1998 (age 28) Ancaster, Ontario, Canada
- Height: 6 ft 2 in (188 cm)
- Weight: 191 lb (87 kg; 13 st 9 lb)
- Position: Right wing
- Shoots: Left
- ICEHL team Former teams: Milano Hockey Club; Dallas Stars Grizzlys Wolfsburg Valerenga Ishockey
- NHL draft: 146th overall, 2016; Dallas Stars
- Playing career: 2017–present

Nicholas Caamano (born September 7, 1998) is a Canadian professional ice hockey forward who is currently under contract with Milano Hockey Club of the ICE Hockey League (ICEHL). He previously played for the Dallas Stars of the National Hockey League (NHL), Grizzlys Wolfsburg of the Deutsche Eishockey Liga (DEL), and Vålerenga Ishockey of the EliteHockey Ligaen (EHL).

== Early life ==
Caamano was born on September 7, 1998, in Ancaster, Ontario, Canada to parents Joe and Amalia Caamano.

== Playing career ==
Born and raised in Ancaster, Caamano attended Bishop Tonnos Catholic Secondary School while playing with the Hamilton Jr. Bulldogs minor midget team. After committing to play for the Plymouth Whalers, who drafted him in the second round of the 2014 Ontario Hockey League (OHL) Priority Selection, he enrolled at the Plymouth-Canton Educational Park.

Caamano played for the Flint Firebirds, Plymouth Whalers and Hamilton Bulldogs in the Ontario Hockey League, and was drafted by the Stars in the 2016 NHL entry draft.

He scored his first career NHL goal against the Washington Capitals on October 8, 2019. Upon returning to the AHL, Caamano was nominated as their representative for the IOA/American Specialty AHL Man of the Year award for his outstanding contributions to the Central Texas community. During the COVID-19 pandemic, Caamano played 24 games in the 2020–21 NHL season with the Dallas Stars, while he also enrolled in economics, sports management and personal finance classes at Southern New Hampshire University. After spending the 2021–22 season playing in the AHL with the Texas Stars, Caamano underwent back surgery in September 2022, and was placed on the non-roster injured reserve list and is expected to be out for at least three months.

Following six professional seasons within the Stars organization, Caamano left the club as a free agent and opted to pursue a career abroad. Caamano played short stints in multiple European leagues, first signing a one-year contract with German club, Grizzlys Wolfsburg of the DEL, on July 26, 2024, then joining the Norwegian club, Vålerenga Ishockey of the EHL, on June 3, 2025, before finally joining Italy's Milano Hockey Club of the ICEHL on June 15, 2026, where he is currently slated to play for the upcoming season.

== Career statistics ==
			Regular season					Playoffs
Season	Team	League	GP	G	A	Pts	PIM	GP	G	A	Pts	PIM
2013–14	Ancaster Avalanche	GOJHL	3	1	4	5	0	—	—	—	—	—
2014–15	Plymouth Whalers	OHL	63	3	6	9	29	—	—	—	—	—
2015–16	Flint Firebirds	OHL	64	20	17	37	40	—	—	—	—	—
2016–17	Flint Firebirds	OHL	67	35	29	64	63	5	0	3	3	8
2016–17	Texas Stars	AHL	6	0	3	3	2	—	—	—	—	—
2017–18	Flint Firebirds	OHL	23	12	9	21	38	—	—	—	—	—
2017–18	Hamilton Bulldogs	OHL	41	13	23	36	56	21	10	12	22	22
2018–19	Texas Stars	AHL	73	12	12	24	91	—	—	—	—	—
2019–20	Dallas Stars	NHL	12	1	1	2	4	4	0	0	0	0
2019–20	Texas Stars	AHL	36	9	14	23	51	—	—	—	—	—
2020–21	Dallas Stars	NHL	24	0	1	1	17	—	—	—	—	—
2021–22	Texas Stars	AHL	47	8	6	14	40	—	—	—	—	—
2022–23	Texas Stars	AHL	29	2	9	11	10	8	4	2	6	4
2023–24	Texas Stars	AHL	55	13	10	23	37	7	0	0	0	4
2024–25	Grizzlys Wolfsburg	DEL	35	9	12	21	24	—	—	—	—	—
2025–26	Vålerenga Ishockey	EHL	35	19	12	31	51	10	0	2	2	14
2026–27	Milano Hockey Club	ICEHL	5	1	3	4	4	—	—	—	—	—
NHL totals			36	1	2	3	21	4	0	0	0	0
