= Justin Fazio =

Canadian-born Italian ice hockey player

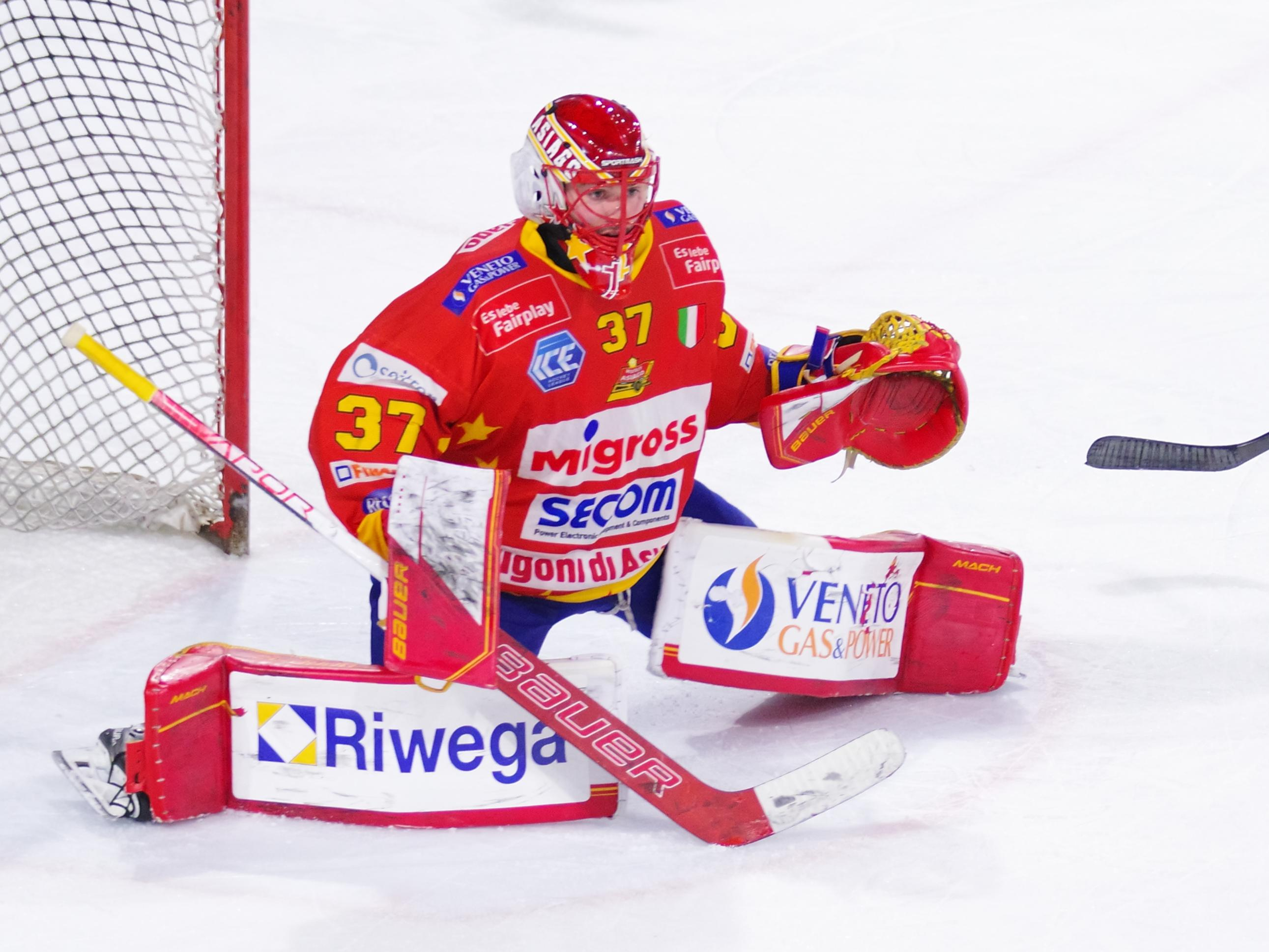
- Born: May 3, 1997 (age 29) Sarnia, Ontario, Canada
- Height: 1.85 m (6 ft 1 in)
- Weight: 87 kg (192 lb; 13 st 10 lb)
- Position: Goaltender
- Catches: Left
- ICEHL team Former teams: Guilford Flames; Charlotte Checkers; Milwaukee Admirals; HC Bolzano; Sarnia Sting
- National team: Italy
- NHL draft: Undrafted
- Playing career: 2017–present

Justin Fazio (born May 3, 1997) is a Canadian-born Italian ice hockey player for Asiago Hockey 1935 in the ICE Hockey League (ICEHL) and the Italian national team.

He represented Italy at the 2021 IIHF World Championship.
