= Hugo Leufvenius =

Swedish ice hockey player

- Born: March 26, 1999 (age 27) Stockholm, Sweden
- Height: 6 ft 3 in (191 cm)
- Weight: 225 lb (102 kg; 16 st 1 lb)
- Position: Centre
- Shot: Left
- Played for: Linköpings HC; Karlskrona HK
- Playing career: 2016–2024

Hugo Leufvenius (born March 26, 1999) is a Swedish professional ice hockey centre currently playing for Karlskrona HK of HockeyAllsvenskan.

Leufvenius played two games in the Swedish Hockey League for Linköpings HC during the 2016–17 SHL season. He also played two seasons in the Ontario Hockey League for the Sarnia Sting.
