= 2016–17 OHL season =

- League: Ontario Hockey League
- Sport: Hockey
- Duration: Preseason; September 2016; Regular season September 21, 2016 – March 21, 2017; Playoffs; March 23, 2017 – May 12, 2017
- Teams: 20
- TV partner(s): Rogers TV, TVCogeco, Shaw TV

Draft
- Top draft pick: Ryan Merkley
- Picked by: Guelph Storm

Regular season
- Hamilton Spectator Trophy: Erie Otters (3)
- Season MVP: Alex DeBrincat (Erie Otters)
- Top scorer: Alex DeBrincat (Erie Otters)

Playoffs
- Playoffs MVP: Warren Foegele (Otters)
- Finals champions: Erie Otters (2)
- Runners-up: Mississauga Steelheads

OHL seasons
- 2015–16 2017–18

2016–17 CHL seasons
- League: Canadian Hockey League
- Sport: Hockey
- Duration: OHL; September 2016 – March 2017; QMJHL; September 2016 – March 2017; WHL; September 2016 – March 2017
- Teams: 60
- TV partner(s): TVA Sports, Rogers Sportsnet, Rogers TV, Shaw TV
- Season MVP: Alex DeBrincat (Erie Otters) (OHL)
- Top scorer: Sam Steel (Regina Pats) (WHL)

Memorial Cup
- Finals champions: Windsor Spitfires (OHL) (3rd title)
- Runners-up: Erie Otters (OHL)

The 2016–17 OHL season was the 37th season of the Ontario Hockey League, in which twenty teams played 68 games each according to the regular season schedule, from September 21, 2016, to March 21, 2017. The playoffs began on March 23, 2017, and ended on May 12. The Erie Otters won the J. Ross Robertson Cup for the second time in franchise history, and the first time since 2002, as they defeated the Mississauga Steelheads in five games to represent the OHL at the 2017 Memorial Cup held at the WFCU Centre in Windsor, Ontario. The Windsor Spitfires also qualified for the tournament as the host team.

== Regular season ==
=== Final standings ===
Note: DIV = Division; GP = Games played; W = Wins; L = Losses; OTL = Overtime losses; SL = Shootout losses; GF = Goals for; GA = Goals against; PTS = Points; x = clinched playoff berth; y = clinched division title; z = clinched conference title

=== Eastern conference ===
Rank	Team	DIV	GP	W	L	OTL	SL	PTS	GF	GA
1	z-Peterborough Petes	East	68	42	21	2	3	89	239	221
2	y-Mississauga Steelheads	Central	68	34	21	6	7	81	240	219
3	x-Oshawa Generals	East	68	40	23	3	2	85	228	215
4	x-Kingston Frontenacs	East	68	33	26	5	4	75	179	200
5	x-Hamilton Bulldogs	East	68	33	27	4	4	74	238	225
6	x-Sudbury Wolves	Central	68	27	34	7	0	61	207	263
7	x-Ottawa 67's	East	68	26	34	7	1	60	221	271
8	x-Niagara IceDogs	Central	68	23	35	6	4	56	207	274
9	North Bay Battalion	Central	68	24	38	5	1	54	192	260
10	Barrie Colts	Central	68	17	44	6	1	41	192	291

=== Western conference ===
Rank	Team	DIV	GP	W	L	OTL	SL	PTS	GF	GA
1	z-Erie Otters	Midwest	68	50	15	2	1	103	319	182
2	y-Sault Ste. Marie Greyhounds	West	68	48	16	3	1	100	287	208
3	x-Owen Sound Attack	Midwest	68	49	15	2	2	102	297	177
4	x-London Knights	Midwest	68	46	15	3	4	99	289	194
5	x-Windsor Spitfires	West	68	41	19	5	3	90	232	185
6	x-Kitchener Rangers	Midwest	68	36	27	3	2	77	244	251
7	x-Flint Firebirds	West	68	32	28	3	5	72	229	242
8	x-Sarnia Sting	West	68	31	30	6	1	69	257	277
9	Saginaw Spirit	West	68	27	32	7	2	63	204	248
10	Guelph Storm	Midwest	68	21	40	5	2	49	202	297

=== Scoring leaders ===
Note: GP = Games played; G = Goals; A = Assists; Pts = Points; PIM = Penalty minutes

Player	Team	GP	G	A	Pts	PIM
Alex DeBrincat	Erie Otters	63	65	62	127	49
Taylor Raddysh	Erie Otters	58	42	67	109	37
Adam Mascherin	Kitchener Rangers	65	35	65	100	20
Petrus Palmu	Owen Sound Attack	62	40	58	98	34
Nick Suzuki	Owen Sound Attack	64	45	51	96	10
Jordan Kyrou	Sarnia Sting	66	30	64	94	36
Ryan Moore	Flint Firebirds	68	39	51	90	57
Cliff Pu	London Knights	63	35	51	86	36
Kole Sherwood	Flint Firebirds	60	33	52	85	60
Kevin Hancock	Owen Sound Attack	68	30	55	85	14
Artur Tyanulin	Ottawa 67's	67	24	61	85	67

=== Leading goaltenders ===
Note: GP = Games played; Mins = Minutes played; W = Wins; L = Losses: OTL = Overtime losses; SL = Shootout losses; GA = Goals Allowed; SO = Shutouts; GAA = Goals against average

Player	Team	GP	Mins	W	L	OTL	SL	GA	SO	Sv%	GAA
Michael McNiven	Owen Sound Attack	54	3184	41	9	2	2	122	6	0.915	2.30
Michael DiPietro	Windsor Spitfires	51	2935	30	12	4	2	115	6	0.917	2.35
Troy Timpano	Erie Otters	44	2559	36	8	0	0	101	4	0.901	2.37
Tyler Parsons	London Knights	34	2000	23	6	2	3	79	4	0.925	2.37
Matt Villalta	Sault Ste. Marie Greyhounds	33	1795	25	3	0	0	72	1	0.918	2.41

== Playoffs ==
Conference quarterfinals	Conference semifinals
1	Erie	4
8	Sarnia	0
1	Erie	4
4	London	3
4	London	4
5	Windsor	3
Western conference
2	Sault Ste. Marie	4
7	Flint	1
2	Sault Ste. Marie	2
3	Owen Sound	4
3	Owen Sound	4
6	Kitchener	1
1	Peterborough	4
8	Niagara	0
1	Peterborough	4
4	Kingston	0
4	Kingston	4
5	Hamilton	3
Eastern conference
2	Mississauga	4
7	Ottawa	2
2	Mississauga	4
3	Oshawa	1
3	Oshawa	4
6	Sudbury	2

Conference finals
1	Erie	4
3	Owen Sound	2
1	Peterborough	0
2	Mississauga	4

Finals
W1	Erie	4
E2	Mississauga	1

=== Conference quarterfinals ===
==== Eastern conference quarterfinals ====
===== (1) Peterborough Petes vs. (8) Niagara IceDogs =====
March 23	Niagara IceDogs	2 – 5	Peterborough Petes	Peterborough Memorial Centre	Recap
Kirill Maksimov (1) - 4:17		First period	13:16 - Adam Timleck (1)
No scoring		Second period	1:15 - Semyon Der-Arguchintsev (1); 7:02 - Josh Coyle (1); 18:52 - Kyle Jenkins (1)
Danial Singer (1) - 14:32		Third period	4:39 - Adam Timleck (2)
Stephen Dhillon (31 saves / 36 shots); Colton Incze (7 saves / 7 shots)		Goalie stats	Dylan Wells (32 saves / 34 shots)

March 25	Niagara IceDogs	3 – 6	Peterborough Petes	Peterborough Memorial Centre	Recap
Ryan Mantha (1) - pp - 8:36; Johnny Corneil (1) - pp - 16:25		First period	6:49 - Steven Lorentz (1)
No scoring		Second period	14:03 - pp - Nikita Korostelev (1); 14:59 - Jonathan Ang (1)
Kirill Maksimov (2) - 18:46		Third period	8:01 - Jonathan Ang (2); 14:07 - pp - Steven Lorentz (2); 19:55 - en - Matt Spencer (1)
Stephen Dhillon (35 saves / 40 shots)		Goalie stats	Dylan Wells (41 saves / 44 shots)

March 28	Peterborough Petes	4 – 3	OT	Niagara IceDogs	Meridian Centre	Recap
Jonathan Ang (3) - pp - 9:19		First period		17:37 - pp - Kirill Maksimov (3)
Steven Lorentz (3) - pp - 9:58; Steven Lorentz (4) - 19:33		Second period		3:07 - Ondřej Machala (1); 3:47 - Ryan Mantha (2)
No scoring		Third period		No scoring
Josh Coyle (2) - 15:59		First overtime period		No scoring
Dylan Wells (39 saves / 42 shots)		Goalie stats		Stephen Dhillon (46 saves / 50 shots)

March 30	Peterborough Petes	6 – 2	Niagara IceDogs	Meridian Centre	Recap
Josh Coyle (3) - 17:53; Jonathan Ang (4) - 19:45		First period	14:12 - Kirill Maksimov (4)
Nick Isaacson (1) - 3:10; Jonathan Ang (5) - 19:02		Second period	9:09 - pp - Danial Singer (2)
Logan DeNoble (1) - 3:02; Matyas Svoboda (1) - 9:34		Third period	No scoring
Dylan Wells (37 saves / 39 shots)		Goalie stats	Stephen Dhillon (30 saves / 36 shots)

Peterborough wins series 4 – 0

===== (2) Mississauga Steelheads vs. (7) Ottawa 67's =====
March 24	Ottawa 67's	2 – 6	Mississauga Steelheads	Hershey Centre	Recap
Sasha Chmelevski (1) - pp - 7:07		First period	12:16 - Michael McLeod (1); 15:42 - Owen Tippett (1); 17:02 - pp - Vili Saarijärvi (1)
Zack Dorval (1) - 17:13		Second period	3:32 - Nathan Bastian (1)
No scoring		Third period	1:07 - Trent Fox (1); 13:20 - en - Trent Fox (2)
Leonid Lazarev (24 saves / 29 shots)		Goalie stats	Jacob Ingham (23 saves / 25 shots)

March 26	Ottawa 67's	4 – 0	Mississauga Steelheads	Hershey Centre	Recap
No scoring		First period	No scoring
Travis Barron (1) - pp - 14:09; Sasha Chmelevski (2) - pp - 16:11; Tye Felhaber (1) - 17:51		Second period	No scoring
Mathieu Foget (1) - en - 17:32		Third period	No scoring
Leonid Lazarev (31 saves / 31 shots)		Goalie stats	Jacob Ingham (20 saves / 23 shots)

March 28	Mississauga Steelheads	2 – 1	Ottawa 67's	TD Place Arena	Recap
No scoring		First period	No scoring
Michael McLeod (2) - 0:10; Jacob Cascagnette (1) - pp - 13:46		Second period	7:31 - pp - Noel Hoefenmayer (1)
No scoring		Third period	No scoring
Jacob Ingham (22 saves / 23 shots)		Goalie stats	Leonid Lazarev (30 saves / 32 shots)

March 30	Mississauga Steelheads	6 – 4	Ottawa 67's	TD Place Arena	Recap
No scoring		First period	No scoring
Spencer Watson (1) - 0:26; Nathan Bastian (2) - 4:06; Vili Saarijärvi (2) - pp - 10:00; Nathan Bastian (3) - 17:46		Second period	14:44 - Austen Keating (1)
Michael McLeod (3) - pp - 11:47; Nathan Bastian (4) - 12:21		Third period	8:27 - Noel Hoefenmayer (2); 10:51 - sh - Patrick White (1); 18:42 - pp - Austen Keating (2)
Jacob Ingham (15 saves / 19 shots)		Goalie stats	Leonid Lazarev (28 saves / 34 shots)

March 31	Ottawa 67's	5 – 3	Mississauga Steelheads	Hershey Centre	Recap
Tye Felhaber (2) - 15:17		First period	No scoring
Patrick White (2) - 2:51		Second period	No scoring
Artur Tyanulin (1) - 6:34; Artur Tyanulin (2) - 12:36; Jared Steege (1) - 17:40		Third period	10:32 - Spencer Watson (2); 17:06 - Nathan Bastian (5); 19:07 - Michael McLeod (4)
Leonid Lazarev (51 saves / 54 shots)		Goalie stats	Jacob Ingham (14 saves / 19 shots)

April 2	Mississauga Steelheads	5 – 1	Ottawa 67's	TD Place Arena	Recap
No scoring		First period	No scoring
Spencer Watson (3) - 2:48; Michael McLeod (5) - 4:55; Michael McLeod (6) - 9:13; Jacob Cascagnette (2) - 12:4-		Second period	No scoring
Spencer Watson (4) - 4:53		Third period	9:51 - Mathieu Foget (2)
Jacob Ingham (19 saves / 20 shots)		Goalie stats	Leonid Lazarev (39 saves / 44 shots)

Mississauga wins series 4 – 2

===== (3) Oshawa Generals vs. (6) Sudbury Wolves =====
March 24	Sudbury Wolves	5 – 2	Oshawa Generals	Tribute Communities Centre	Recap
Alan Lyszczarczyk (1) - pp - 9:46; Dmitry Sokolov (1) - pp - 13:36		First period	No scoring
Drake Pilon (1) - 3:36; Michael Pezzetta (1) - 18:51		Second period	13:04 - Serron Noel (1)
Macauley Carson (1) - 2:16		Third period	15:55 - Kenny Huether (1)
Jake McGrath (33 saves / 35 shots)		Goalie stats	Jeremy Brodeur (26 saves / 31 shots)

March 26	Sudbury Wolves	1 – 5	Oshawa Generals	Tribute Communities Centre	Recap
No scoring		First period	10:39 - pp - Jack Studnicka (1)
No scoring		Second period	6:24 - Jack Studnicka (2); 11:37 - sh - Kyle MacLean (1)
Dmitry Sokolov (2) - pp - 13:56		Third period	2:51 - pp - Matt Brassard (1); 7:27 - Mason Kohn (1)
Jake McGrath (27 saves / 32 shots)		Goalie stats	Jeremy Brodeur (34 saves / 35 shots)

March 28	Oshawa Generals	2 – 3	Sudbury Wolves	Sudbury Community Arena	Recap
Robbie Burt (1) - 9:44		First period	No scoring
No scoring		Second period	6:00 - Dmitry Sokolov (3); 10:45 - pp - Macauley Carson (2); 14:59 - sh - Michael Pezzetta (2)
Danil Antropov (1) - 7:44		Third period	No scoring
Jeremy Brodeur (26 saves / 29 shots)		Goalie stats	Jake McGrath (33 saves / 35 shots)

March 30	Oshawa Generals	4 – 2	Sudbury Wolves	Sudbury Community Arena	Recap
Joe Manchurek (1) - 1:42; Renārs Krastenbergs (1) - 16:11		First period	19:53 - David Levin (1)
Robbie Burt (2) - pp - 5:12		Second period	18:32 - Dmitry Sokolov (4)
Domenico Commisso (1) - 7:13		Third period	No scoring
Jeremy Brodeur (41 saves / 43 shots)		Goalie stats	Jake McGrath (24 saves / 28 shots)

March 31	Sudbury Wolves	1 – 4	Oshawa Generals	Tribute Communities Centre	Recap
No scoring		First period	7:11 - Jack Studnicka (3)
No scoring		Second period	5:37 - Renārs Krastenbergs (2)
Dmitry Sokolov (5) - 9:13		Third period	15:17 - Joe Manchurek (2); 18:42 - en - Mason Kohn (2)
Jake McGrath (22 saves / 25 shots)		Goalie stats	Jeremy Brodeur (34 saves / 35 shots)

April 2	Oshawa Generals	3 – 1	Sudbury Wolves	Sudbury Community Arena	Recap
No scoring		First period	8:59 - Dmitry Sokolov (6)
Renārs Krastenbergs (3) - 19:18		Second period	No scoring
Kenny Huether (2) - 6:34; Joe Manchurek (3) - en - 19:11		Third period	No scoring
Jeremy Brodeur (26 saves / 27 shots)		Goalie stats	Jake McGrath (27 saves / 29 shots)

Oshawa wins series 4 – 2

===== (4) Kingston Frontenacs vs. (5) Hamilton Bulldogs =====
March 24	Hamilton Bulldogs	2 – 0	Kingston Frontenacs	Rogers K-Rock Centre	Recap
William Bitten (1) - pp - 18:44		First period	No scoring
William Bitten (2) - pp - 16:36		Second period	No scoring
No scoring		Third period	No scoring
Dawson Carty (19 saves / 19 shots)		Goalie stats	Jeremy Helvig (27 saves / 29 shots)

March 26	Hamilton Bulldogs	5 – 4	Kingston Frontenacs	Rogers K-Rock Centre	Recap
No scoring		First period	7:00 - Stephen Desrocher (1); 16:01 - pp - Linus Nyman (1)
Matt Luff (1) - 0:10; Marián Studenič (1) - 4:24; Niki Petti (1) - 7:09; Connor Roberts (1) - 7:57; Niki Petti (2) - 14:29		Second period	6:25 - Nathan Dunkley (1); 18:22 - Jason Robertson (1)
No scoring		Third period	No scoring
Dawson Carty (35 saves / 39 shots)		Goalie stats	Jeremy Helvig (18 saves / 23 shots)

March 28	Kingston Frontenacs	4 – 2	Hamilton Bulldogs	FirstOntario Centre	Recap
Nathan Billitier (1) - 18:26		First period	9:17 - Michael Cramarossa (1)
No scoring		Second period	4:04 - Niki Petti (3)
Brett Neumann (1) - 9:46; Nathan Dunkley (2) - 13:25; Nathan Dunkley (3) - en - 19:15		Third period	No scoring
Jeremy Helvig (29 saves / 31 shots)		Goalie stats	Dawson Carty (26 saves / 29 shots)

March 30	Kingston Frontenacs	5 – 1	Hamilton Bulldogs	FirstOntario Centre	Recap
Jason Robertson (2) - 8:13; Ted Nichol (1) - 8:29; Sam Field (1) - 17:00		First period	No scoring
Cody Caron (1) - 11:43		Second period	No scoring
Brett Neumann (2) - 12:45		Third period	9:15 - pp - Marián Studenič (2)
Jeremy Helvig (22 saves / 23 shots)		Goalie stats	Dawson Carty (7 saves / 10 shots); Kaden Fulcher (17 saves / 19 shots)

March 31	Hamilton Bulldogs	2 – 4	Kingston Frontenacs	Rogers K-Rock Centre	Recap
No scoring		First period	1:11 - Ryan Cranford (1); 18:06 - pp - Stephen Desrocher (2)
Matt Luff (2) - pp - 8:21; Justin Lemcke (1) - 15:52		Second period	14:28 - Linus Nyman (2)
No scoring		Third period	4:07 - Jason Robertson (3)
Dawson Carty (24 saves / 28 shots)		Goalie stats	Jeremy Helvig (20 saves / 22 shots)

April 2	Kingston Frontenacs	2 – 5	Hamilton Bulldogs	FirstOntario Centre	Recap
Eemeli Rasanen (1) - pp - 13:03		First period	No scoring
Nathan Dunkley (4) - 2:00		Second period	1:17 - Luke Kutkevicius (1); 10:03 - pp - William Bitten (3); 13:42 - Matthew Strome (1); 14:56 - MacKenzie Entwistle (1)
No scoring		Third period	17:51 - en - Matt Luff (3)
Jeremy Helvig (23 saves / 27 shots)		Goalie stats	Dawson Carty (28 saves / 30 shots)

April 4	Hamilton Bulldogs	2 – 3	OT	Kingston Frontenacs	Rogers K-Rock Centre	Recap
No scoring		First period		No scoring
Matt Luff (4) - 14:45; Michael Cramarossa (2) - 19:11		Second period		19:29 - Jason Robertson (4)
No scoring		Third period		5:05 - Linus Nyman (3)
No scoring		First overtime period		8:48 - Linus Nyman (4)
Dawson Carty (18 saves / 21 shots)		Goalie stats		Jeremy Helvig (23 saves / 25 shots)

Kingston wins series 4 – 3

==== Western conference quarterfinals ====
===== (1) Erie Otters vs. (8) Sarnia Sting =====
March 23	Sarnia Sting	3 – 6	Erie Otters	Erie Insurance Arena	Recap
Drake Rymsha (1) - pp - 3:20		First period	7:35 - Kyle Maksimovich (1); 11:06 - Warren Foegele (1); 14:25 - Kyle Maksimovich (2)
Jordan Ernst (1) - 11:15		Second period	13:00 - Alex DeBrincat (1)
Jordan Kyrou (1) - 10:53		Third period	5:53 - Taylor Raddysh (1); 16:44 - pp - Anthony Cirelli (1)
Justin Fazio (45 saves / 51 shots)		Goalie stats	Troy Timpano (20 saves / 23 shots)

March 25	Erie Otters	9 – 3	Sarnia Sting	Progressive Auto Sales Arena	Recap
Warren Foegele (2) - pp - 8:55; Taylor Raddysh (2) - 13:20; Erik Černák (1) - 13:47; Anthony Cirelli (2) - pp - 17:08		First period	No scoring
Dylan Strome (1) - 1:25; Dylan Strome (2) - 14:27; Anthony Cirelli (3) - 15:16		Second period	13:11 - pp - Jordan Ernst
Ivan Lodnia (1) - pp - 15:44; Haydn Hopkins (1) - 16:19		Third period	9:01 - Kevin Spinozzi (1); 10:56 - Kevin Spinozzi (2)
Troy Timpano (26 saves / 29 shots)		Goalie stats	Aidan Hughes (24 saves / 31 shots); Blair Coffin (12 saves / 14 shots)

March 27	Erie Otters	5 – 3	Sarnia Sting	Progressive Auto Sales Arena	Recap
Dylan Strome (3) - pp - 1:23		First period	5:06 - pp - Jordan Ernst (3)
Darren Raddysh (1) - pp - 5:41; Alex DeBrincat (2) - 15:37; Darren Raddysh (2) - pp - 19:59		Second period	No scoring
Kyle Pettit (1) - en - 19:59		Third period	8:59 - pp - Kevin Spinozzi (3); 16:42 - pp - Jaden Lindo (1)
Troy Timpano (25 saves / 28 shots)		Goalie stats	Aidan Hughes (35 saves / 39 shots)

March 29	Sarnia Sting	3 – 9	Erie Otters	Erie Insurance Arena	Recap
Franco Sproviero (1) - 18:04		First period	4:46 - pp - Anthony Cirelli (4); 6:11 - Dylan Strome (4); 8:52 - Haydn Hopkins (2); 12:13 - Dylan Strome (5); 13:44 - T. J. Fergus (1)
Ryan McGregor (1) - 5:04		Second period	No scoring
Jaden Lindo (2) - 4:50		Third period	7:19 - Kyle Maksimovich (3); 8:26 - Darren Raddysh (3); 14:14 - sh - Taylor Raddysh (3); 15:17 - Dylan Strome (6)
Justin Fazio (34 saves / 43 shots)		Goalie stats	Troy Timpano (18 saves / 21 shots)

Erie wins series 4 – 0

===== (2) Sault Ste. Marie Greyhounds vs. (7) Flint Firebirds =====
March 23	Flint Firebirds	2 – 5	Sault Ste. Marie Greyhounds	Essar Centre	Recap
No scoring		First period	10:34 - Hayden Verbeek (1); 13:50 - Jack Kopacka (1)
Mathieu Henderson (1) - pp - 19:11; Alex Peters (1) - 19:33		Second period	8:25 - Hayden Verbeek (2)
No scoring		Third period	7:29 - Boris Katchouk (1); 18:08 - en - Blake Speers (1)
Connor Hicks (32 saves / 36 shots)		Goalie stats	Matt Villalta (19 saves / 21 shots)

March 25	Flint Firebirds	6 – 3	Sault Ste. Marie Greyhounds	Essar Centre	Recap
Kole Sherwood (1) - 4:35; Alex Peters (2) - 7:04		First period	No scoring
Jalen Smereck (1) - pp - 0:43; Maurizio Colella (1) - pp - 11:54; Ryan Moore (1) - sh - 18:22		Second period	2:57 - sh - Boris Katchouk (2)
Maurizio Colella (2) - sh - en - 18:41		Third period	1:53 - Zachary Senyshyn (1); 13:24 - Jack Kopacka (2)
Connor Hicks (24 saves / 27 shots)		Goalie stats	Matt Villalta (18 saves / 23 shots); Joseph Raaymakers (7 saves / 7 shots)

March 27	Sault Ste. Marie Greyhounds	3 – 1	Flint Firebirds	Dort Federal Credit Union Event Center	Recap
No scoring		First period	8:12 - Kole Sherwood (2)
Tim Gettinger (1) - sh - 2:17		Second period	No scoring
Zachary Senyshyn (2) - pp - 13:37; Boris Katchouk (3) - en - 19:12		Third period	No scoring
Joseph Raaymakers (33 saves / 34 shots)		Goalie stats	Connor Hicks (25 saves / 27 shots)

March 29	Sault Ste. Marie Greyhounds	5 – 2	Flint Firebirds	Dort Federal Credit Union Event Center	Recap
Morgan Frost (1) - pp - 9:34; Otto Makinen (1) - 13:46		First period	No scoring
Boris Katchouk (4) - 0:17; David Miller (1) - 2:35		Second period	6:58 - Everett Clark (1)
Bobby McIntyre (1) - 4:50		Third period	8:34 - pp - Kole Sherwood (3)
Joseph Raaymakers (28 saves / 30 shots)		Goalie stats	Connor Hicks (31 saves / 36 shots)

March 31	Flint Firebirds	1 – 6	Sault Ste. Marie Greyhounds	Essar Centre	Recap
Kole Sherwood (4) - 16:35		First period	7:52 - Gustav Bouramman (1); 19:59 - Tim Gettinger (2)
No scoring		Second period	3:48 - pp - Boris Katchouk (5); 4:51 - pp - Tim Gettinger (3); 6:27 - Zachary Senyshyn (3); 7:06 - David Miller (2)
No scoring		Third period	No scoring
Connor Hicks (33 saves / 39 shots)		Goalie stats	Joseph Raaymakers (21 saves / 22 shots)

Sault Ste. Marie wins series 4 – 1

===== (3) Owen Sound Attack vs. (6) Kitchener Rangers =====
March 24	Kitchener Rangers	1 – 9	Owen Sound Attack	Bayshore Community Centre	Recap
No scoring		First period	7:33 - Jonah Gadjovich (1); 15:19 - Kevin Hancock (1)
No scoring		Second period	4:30 - pp - Maksim Sushko (1); 6:43 - Petrus Palmu (1); 8:25 - Cordell James (1); 15:05 - sh - Nick Suzuki (1); 19:02 - Santino Centorame (1)
Cole Carter (1) - 6:02		Third period	6:29 - pp - Ethan Szypula (1); 14:49 - Matt Schmalz (1)
Luke Opilka (28 saves / 35 shots); Luke Richardson (13 saves / 15 shots)		Goalie stats	Michael McNiven (24 saves / 25 shots)

March 25	Kitchener Rangers	2 – 1	Owen Sound Attack	Bayshore Community Centre	Recap
Adam Mascherin (1) - pp - 9:03		First period	0:33 - Petrus Palmu (2)
No scoring		Second period	No scoring
Jonathan Yantsis (1) - 4:44		Third period	No scoring
Luke Opilka (40 saves / 41 shots)		Goalie stats	Michael McNiven (24 saves / 26 shots)

March 27	Owen Sound Attack	4 – 0	Kitchener Rangers	Kitchener Memorial Auditorium	Recap
Santino Centorame (2) - 17:45		First period	No scoring
No scoring		Second period	No scoring
Nick Suzuki (2) - 3:26; Kevin Hancock (2) - pp - 6:08; Nick Suzuki (3) - en - 18:35		Third period	No scoring
Michael McNiven (21 saves / 21 shots)		Goalie stats	Luke Opilka (41 saves / 44 shots)

March 29	Owen Sound Attack	7 – 4	Kitchener Rangers	Kitchener Memorial Auditorium	Recap
Petrus Palmu (3) - 13:39; Cordell James (2) - pp - 19:40		First period	2:40 - Connor Bunnaman (1)
Kevin Hancock (3) - sh - 9:15; Petrus Palmu (4) - sh - 10:02		Second period	1:29 - Riley Damiani (1); 4:54 - pp - Connor Bunnaman (2); 18:20 - Jonathan Yantsis (2)
Petrus Palmu (5) - pp - 0:23; Matthew Struthers (1) - 17:10; Jonah Gadjovich (2) - en - 18:43		Third period	No scoring
Michael McNiven (16 saves / 20 shots)		Goalie stats	Luke Opilka (64 saves / 70 shots)

March 31	Kitchener Rangers	2 – 6	Owen Sound Attack	Bayshore Community Centre	Recap
Connor Bunnaman (3) - 0:24		First period	6:58 - pp - Ethan Szypula (2); 15:01 - Santino Centorame (3)
No scoring		Second period	7:04 - sh - Petrus Palmu (6); 13:57 - pp - Nick Suzuki (4); 14:32 - Matthew Struthers (2)
Connor Bunnaman (4) - pp - 1:51		Third period	8:15 - pp - Kevin Hancock (4)
Luke Opilka (32 saves / 38 shots)		Goalie stats	Michael McNiven (26 saves / 28 shots)

Owen Sound wins series 4 – 1

===== (4) London Knights vs. (5) Windsor Spitfires =====
March 24	Windsor Spitfires	4 – 3	OT	London Knights	Budweiser Gardens	Recap
No scoring		First period		5:08 - pp - Olli Juolevi (1)
Jeremiah Addison (1) - 2:10; Aaron Luchuk (1) - pp - 14:21		Second period		6:29 - Victor Mete (1)
Aaron Luchuk (2) - 1:31		Third period		17:51 - Mitchell Stephens (1)
Jeremiah Addison (2) - 15:06		First overtime period		No scoring
Michael DiPietro (35 saves / 38 shots)		Goalie stats		Tyler Parsons (43 saves / 47 shots)

March 26	Windsor Spitfires	2 – 5	London Knights	Budweiser Gardens	Recap
No scoring		First period	11:35 - Cliff Pu (1)
Aaron Luchuk (3) - pp - 14:41; Mikhail Sergachev (1) - 17:06		Second period	8:09 - pp - Olli Juolevi (2)
No scoring		Third period	11:32 - pp - Mitchell Stephens (2); 18:54 - en - Max Jones (1); 19:35 - en - Max Jones (2)
Michael DiPietro (30 saves / 33 shots)		Goalie stats	Tyler Parsons (29 saves / 31 shots)

March 28	London Knights	1 – 3	Windsor Spitfires	WFCU Centre	Recap
No scoring		First period	12:25 - pp - Julius Nättinen (1)
Janne Kuokkanen (1) - 1:33		Second period	6:15 - Gabriel Vilardi (1); 12:15 - Cristiano DiGiacinto (1)
No scoring		Third period	No scoring
Tyler Parsons (15 saves / 18 shots)		Goalie stats	Michael DiPietro (15 saves / 16 shots)

March 30	London Knights	2 – 3	OT	Windsor Spitfires	WFCU Centre	Recap
No scoring		First period		2:42 - pp - Graham Knott (1)
Evan Bouchard (1) - 6:26; Janne Kuokkanen (2) - pp - 8:26		Second period		16:20 - pp - Gabriel Vilardi (2)
No scoring		Third period		No scoring
No scoring		First overtime period		5:58 - Graham Knott (2)
Tyler Parsons (30 saves / 33 shots)		Goalie stats		Michael DiPietro (31 saves / 33 shots)

March 31	Windsor Spitfires	1 – 2	London Knights	Budweiser Gardens	Recap
No scoring		First period	7:05 - Robert Thomas (1)
Jeremy Bracco (1) - 0:21		Second period	12:09 - Mitchell Stephens (3)
No scoring		Third period	No scoring
Michael DiPietro (27 saves / 29 shots)		Goalie stats	Tyler Parsons (25 saves / 26 shots)

April 2	London Knights	5 – 3	Windsor Spitfires	WFCU Centre	Recap
No scoring		First period	4:59 - Jeremiah Addison (3)
Mitchell Stephens (4) - pp - 5:53; Janne Kuokkanen (3) - 10:12		Second period	No scoring
J.J. Piccinich (1) - 4:23; Robert Thomas (2) - 5:50; Robert Thomas (3) - en - 19:00		Third period	11:38 - Jeremiah Addison (4); 14:38 - Jeremiah Addison (5)
Tyler Parsons (25 saves / 28 shots)		Goalie stats	Michael DiPietro (39 saves / 43 shots)

April 4	Windsor Spitfires	2 – 3	London Knights	Budweiser Gardens	Recap
No scoring		First period	No scoring
No scoring		Second period	3:55 - pp - Janne Kuokkanen (4); 12:04 - Max Jones (3)
Jeremy Bracco (2) - 2:15; Aaron Luchuk (4) - pp - 9:34		Third period	12:49 - pp - Olli Juolevi (3)
Michael DiPietro (26 saves / 29 shots)		Goalie stats	Tyler Parsons (30 saves / 32 shots)

London wins series 4 – 3

=== Conference semifinals ===
==== Eastern conference semifinals ====
===== (1) Peterborough Petes vs. (4) Kingston Frontenacs =====
April 6	Kingston Frontenacs	2 – 4	Peterborough Petes	Peterborough Memorial Centre	Recap
No scoring		First period	11:29 - Steven Lorentz (5); 17:09 - Nikita Korostelev (2)
Sam Harding (1) - 11:04		Second period	6:31 - pp - Kyle Jenkins (2)
Linus Nyman (5) - 8:23		Third period	11:31 - Christopher Paquette (1)
Jeremy Helvig (30 saves / 34 shots)		Goalie stats	Dylan Wells (27 saves / 29 shots)

April 9	Kingston Frontenacs	1 – 4	Peterborough Petes	Peterborough Memorial Centre	Recap
No scoring		First period	9:27 - pp - Christopher Paquette (2)
No scoring		Second period	19:30 - Alex Black (1)
Ted Nichol (2) - 17:27		Third period	14:44 - Steven Lorentz (6); 18:25 - en - Josh Coyle (4)
Jeremy Helvig (33 saves / 36 shots)		Goalie stats	Dylan Wells (28 saves / 29 shots)

April 11	Peterborough Petes	3 – 1	Kingston Frontenacs	Rogers K-Rock Centre	Recap
Adam Timleck (3) - 0:11		First period	No scoring
Semyon Der-Arguchintsev (2) - 15:09; Alex Black (2) - 19:20		Second period	No scoring
No scoring		Third period	13:19 - pp - Linus Nyman (6)
Dylan Wells (33 saves / 34 shots)		Goalie stats	Jeremy Helvig (14 saves / 17 shots)

April 13	Peterborough Petes	6 – 2	Kingston Frontenacs	Rogers K-Rock Centre	Recap
No scoring		First period	5:26 - pp - Jason Robertson (5)
Steven Lorentz (7) - 9:33; Jonathan Ang (6) - 11:27; Steven Lorentz (8) - 17:40		Second period	3:24 - Linus Nyman (7)
Christopher Paquette (3) - 9:05; Jonathan Ang (7) - en - 16:49; Dylan Wells (1) - en - 19:18		Third period	No scoring
Dylan Wells (33 saves / 35 shots)		Goalie stats	Jeremy Helvig (26 saves / 30 shots)

Peterborough wins series 4 – 0

===== (2) Mississauga Steelheads vs. (3) Oshawa Generals =====
April 7	Oshawa Generals	3 – 2	Mississauga Steelheads	Hershey Centre	Recap
Joe Manchurek (4) - pp - 4:40; Jack Studnicka (4) - 7:46		First period	No scoring
Riley Stillman (1) - pp - 16:45		Second period	12:57 - pp - Vili Saarijärvi (3)
No scoring		Third period	2:40 - pp - Jacob Cascagnette (3)
Jeremy Brodeur (50 saves / 52 shots)		Goalie stats	Matthew Mancina (18 saves / 21 shots)

April 9	Oshawa Generals	3 – 7	Mississauga Steelheads	Hershey Centre	Recap
Renārs Krastenbergs (4) - 2:30		First period	2:50 - Ryan McLeod (1); 6:14 - Trent Fox (3); 19:53 - Owen Tippett (2)
Domenico Commisso (2) - 4:31; Eric Henderson (1) - 11:53		Second period	10:52 - Jacob Cascagnette (4); 18:11 - Spencer Watson (5)
No scoring		Third period	5:01 - Brendan Harrogate (1); 19:00 - Matthew Titus (1)
Jeremy Brodeur (22 saves / 29 shots)		Goalie stats	Matthew Mancina (28 saves / 31 shots)

April 11	Mississauga Steelheads	7 – 4	Oshawa Generals	Tribute Communities Centre	Recap
Nicolas Hague (1) - pp - 4:37; Vili Saarijärvi (4) - 8:33		First period	14:03 - Renārs Krastenbergs (5); 16:06 - pp - Jack Studnicka (5)
Spencer Watson (6) - 4:44; Owen Tippett (3) - pp - 5:27; Spencer Watson (7) - 12:44		Second period	16:31 - pp - Danil Antropov (2)
Spencer Watson (8) - pp - 7:05; Brendan Harrogate (2) - pp - 9:48		Third period	16:36 - pp - Renārs Krastenbergs (6)
Matthew Mancina (29 saves / 33 shots)		Goalie stats	Jeremy Brodeur (30 saves / 36 shots); Logan Gauthier (6 saves / 7 shots)

April 13	Mississauga Steelheads	4 – 3	Oshawa Generals	Tribute Communities Centre	Recap
Spencer Watson (9) - 18:25		First period	No scoring
Jacob Cascagnette (5) - 8:55; Spencer Watson (10) - 12:09; Owen Tippett (4) - 14:20		Second period	No scoring
No scoring		Third period	0:39 - Mason Kohn (3); 7:20 - pp - Kyle MacLean (2); 14:22 - pp - Medric Mercier (1)
Matthew Mancina (20 saves / 23 shots)		Goalie stats	Jeremy Brodeur (15 saves / 18 shots); Kyle Keyser (23 saves / 24 shots)

April 15	Mississauga Steelheads	3 – 1	Oshawa Generals	Tribute Communities Centre	Recap
No scoring		First period	No scoring
Stefan LeBlanc (1) - 8:54; Trent Fox (4) - 15:25		Second period	No scoring
Nathan Bastian (6) - 12:41		Third period	18:57 - Joe Manchurek (5)
Matthew Mancina (22 saves / 23 shots)		Goalie stats	Kyle Keyser (36 saves / 39 shots)

Mississauga wins series 4 – 1

==== Western conference semifinals ====
===== (1) Erie Otters vs. (4) London Knights =====
April 6	London Knights	2 – 0	Erie Otters	Erie Insurance Arena	Recap
No scoring		First period	No scoring
Mitchell Stephens (5) - 14:23; Evan Bouchard (2) - 19:26		Second period	No scoring
No scoring		Third period	No scoring
Tyler Parsons (46 saves / 46 shots)		Goalie stats	Troy Timpano (10 saves / 12 shots)

April 7	London Knights	1 – 5	Erie Otters	Erie Insurance Arena	Recap
No scoring		First period	10:43 - Darren Raddysh (4); 12:12 - pp - Darren Raddysh (5)
Mitchell Vande Sompel (1) - 13:02		Second period	7:41 - Kyle Maksimovich (4); 19:57 - pp - Taylor Raddysh (4)
No scoring		Third period	18:01 - en - Darren Raddysh (6)
Tyler Parsons (27 saves / 31 shots); Tyler Johnson (0 saves / 0 shots)		Goalie stats	Troy Timpano (23 saves / 24 shots); Joseph Murdaca (0 saves / 0 shots)

April 11	Erie Otters	3 – 1	London Knights	Budweiser Gardens	Recap
No scoring		First period	12:50 - Janne Kuokkanen (5)
Anthony Cirelli (5) - 0:58; Alex DeBrincat (3) - pp - 6:10		Second period	No scoring
Alex DeBrincat (4) - 6:34		Third period	No scoring
Troy Timpano (33 saves / 34 shots)		Goalie stats	Tyler Parsons (33 saves / 36 shots)

April 13	Erie Otters	2 – 4	London Knights	Budweiser Gardens	Recap
Warren Foegele (3) - 8:12; Anthony Cirelli (6) - pp - 18:14		First period	No scoring
No scoring		Second period	No scoring
No scoring		Third period	5:51 - Max Jones (4); 10:30 - Janne Kuokkanen (6); 11:01 - Janne Kuokkanen (7); 19:32 - en - Max Jones (5)
Troy Timpano (29 saves / 32 shots)		Goalie stats	Tyler Parsons (26 saves / 28 shots)

April 15	London Knights	3 – 6	Erie Otters	Erie Insurance Arena	Recap
No scoring		First period	8:51 - Jordan Sambrook (1); 15:06 - Alex DeBrincat (5)
Max Jones (6) - 1:47; Max Jones (7) - 2:38; Janne Kuokkanen (8) - 2:57		Second period	16:32 - Patrick Fellows (1)
No scoring		Third period	10:00 - Taylor Raddysh (5); 11:24 - Dylan Strome (7); 16:36 - Anthony Cirelli (7)
Tyler Parsons (33 saves / 39 shots)		Goalie stats	Troy Timpano (7 saves / 10 shots); Joseph Murdaca (13 saves / 13 shots)

April 16	Erie Otters	1 – 2	OT	London Knights	Budweiser Gardens	Recap
Jordan Sambrook (2) - 0:47		First period		No scoring
No scoring		Second period		17:45 - pp - Janne Kuokkanen (9)
No scoring		Third period		No scoring
No scoring		First overtime period		9:44 - Mitchell Stephens (6)
Troy Timpano (24 saves / 26 shots)		Goalie stats		Tyler Parsons (44 saves / 45 shots)

April 18	London Knights	4 – 5	OT	Erie Otters	Erie Insurance Arena	Recap
Janne Kuokkanen (10) - pp - 12:18; Evan Bouchard (3) - 13:44; Cliff Pu (2) - 14:29		First period		8:41 - Ivan Lodnia (2); 19:59 - Darren Raddysh (7)
No scoring		Second period		No scoring
Mitchell Stephens (7) - 19:00		Third period		5:14 - Anthony Cirelli (8); 16:29 - Alex DeBrincat (6)
No scoring		First overtime period		10:40 - Warren Foegele (4)
Tyler Parsons (58 saves / 63 shots)		Goalie stats		Troy Timpano (8 saves / 11 shots); Joseph Murdaca (17 saves / 18 shots)

Erie wins series 4 – 3

===== (2) Sault Ste. Marie Greyhounds vs. (3) Owen Sound Attack =====
April 5	Owen Sound Attack	1 – 4	Sault Ste. Marie Greyhounds	Essar Centre	Recap
No scoring		First period	No scoring
No scoring		Second period	2:08 - Jack Kopacka (3)
No scoring		Third period	6:03 - pp - Gustav Bouramman (2); 16:25 - Jack Kopacka (4); 19:14 - sh - en - Conor Timmins (1)
Michael McNiven (34 saves / 37 shots)		Goalie stats	Joseph Raaymakers (27 saves / 28 shots)

April 7	Owen Sound Attack	1 – 4	Sault Ste. Marie Greyhounds	Essar Centre	Recap
No scoring		First period	5:22 - pp - Barrett Hayton (1); 19:59 - pp - Barrett Hayton (2)
No scoring		Second period	14:36 - Bobby McIntyre (2)
Petrus Palmu (7) - 7:26		Third period	18:42 - en - Tim Gettinger (4)
Michael McNiven (34 saves / 37 shots)		Goalie stats	Joseph Raaymakers (34 saves / 35 shots)

April 9	Sault Ste. Marie Greyhounds	1 – 4	Owen Sound Attack	Bayshore Community Centre	Recap
No scoring		First period	5:49 - pp - Jacob Friend (1)
Boris Katchouk (6) - 18:26		Second period	12:07 - Kevin Hancock (5)
No scoring		Third period	6:30 - Sean Durzi (1); 18:46 - en - Petrus Palmu (8)
Joseph Raaymakers (37 saves / 40 shots)		Goalie stats	Michael McNiven (22 saves / 23 shots)

April 11	Sault Ste. Marie Greyhounds	2 – 4	Owen Sound Attack	Bayshore Community Centre	Recap
No scoring		First period	2:07 - Chase Campbell (1)
Boris Katchouk (7) - 6:10		Second period	4:49 - sh - Nick Suzuki (5)
Morgan Frost (2) - 15:38		Third period	8:20 - pp - Petrus Palmu (9); 16:09 - Jonah Gadjovich (3)
Joseph Raaymakers (37 saves / 41 shots)		Goalie stats	Michael McNiven (25 saves / 27 shots)

April 14	Owen Sound Attack	4 – 3	Sault Ste. Marie Greyhounds	Essar Centre	Recap
Nick Suzuki (6) - 6:07; Chase Campbell (2) - 14:54; Kevin Hancock (6) - 18:51		First period	No scoring
No scoring		Second period	0:38 - Jack Kopacka (5)
Petrus Palmu (10) - 17:34		Third period	0:23 - Boris Katchouk (8); 18:31 - Zachary Senyshyn (4)
Michael McNiven (36 saves / 39 shots)		Goalie stats	Joseph Raaymakers (30 saves / 34 shots)

April 16	Sault Ste. Marie Greyhounds	0 – 1	Owen Sound Attack	Bayshore Community Centre	Recap
No scoring		First period	No scoring
No scoring		Second period	13:09 - Nick Suzuki (7)
No scoring		Third period	No scoring
Joseph Raaymakers (41 saves / 42 shots)		Goalie stats	Michael McNiven (23 saves / 23 shots)

Owen Sound wins series 4 – 2

=== Conference finals ===
==== Eastern conference finals ====
===== (1) Peterborough Petes vs. (2) Mississauga Steelheads =====
April 20	Mississauga Steelheads	5 – 3	Peterborough Petes	Peterborough Memorial Centre	Recap
Owen Tippett (5) - 12:57		First period	No scoring
Spencer Watson (11) - 14:08; Ryan McLeod (2) - pp - 19:07		Second period	2:03 - Steven Lorentz (9); 12:05 - pp - Nikita Korostelev (3)
Spencer Watson (12) - 12:23; Michael McLeod (7) - 13:42		Third period	11:19 - Semyon Der-Arguchintsev (3)
Matthew Mancina (27 saves / 30 shots)		Goalie stats	Dylan Wells (27 saves / 32 shots)

April 22	Mississauga Steelheads	3 – 0	Peterborough Petes	Peterborough Memorial Centre	Recap
No scoring		First period	No scoring
Jacob Moverare (1) - 6:18; Owen Tippett (6) - 11:45		Second period	No scoring
Spencer Watson (13) - en - 17:51		Third period	No scoring
Matthew Mancina (24 saves / 24 shots)		Goalie stats	Dylan Wells (49 saves / 51 shots)

April 24	Peterborough Petes	1 – 2	2OT	Mississauga Steelheads	Hershey Centre	Recap
Nikita Korostelev (4) - 2:03		First period		No scoring
No scoring		Second period		0:28 - Spencer Watson (14)
No scoring		Third period		No scoring
No scoring		Second overtime period		10:29 - Michael McLeod (8)
Dylan Wells (53 saves / 55 shots)		Goalie stats		Matthew Mancina (28 saves / 29 shots)

April 26	Peterborough Petes	0 – 7	Mississauga Steelheads	Hershey Centre	Recap
No scoring		First period	8:29 - Owen Tippett (7); 11:54 - Ryan McLeod (3)
No scoring		Second period	2:05 - Vili Saarijarvi (5); 9:20 - Jacob Moverare (2); 16:58 - Trent Fox (5)
No scoring		Third period	0:33 - Michael McLeod (9); 17:18 - Brendan Harrogate (3)
Dylan Wells (24 saves / 31 shots)		Goalie stats	Matthew Mancina (24 saves / 24 shots)

Mississauga wins series 4 – 0

==== Western conference finals ====
===== (1) Erie Otters vs. (3) Owen Sound Attack =====
April 21	Owen Sound Attack	1 – 6	Erie Otters	Erie Insurance Arena	Recap
No scoring		First period	2:19 - Anthony Cirelli (9)
No scoring		Second period	0:40 - Taylor Raddysh (6); 6:58 - Taylor Raddysh (7); 8:28 - Warren Foegele (5); 13:43 - Alex DeBrincat (7)
Chase Campbell (3) - 2:02		Third period	3:52 - Dylan Strome (8)
Michael McNiven (11 saves / 16 shots); Emanuel Vella (15 saves / 16 shots)		Goalie stats	Joseph Murdaca (27 saves / 28 shots)

April 22	Owen Sound Attack	4 – 3	OT	Erie Otters	Erie Insurance Arena	Recap
Nick Suzuki (8) - 16:10		First period		13:46 - Alex DeBrincat (8); 19:30 - Dylan Strome (9)
Kevin Hancock (7) - sh - 15:06		Second period		7:17 - Warren Foegele (6)
Maksim Sushko (2) - 2:03		Third period		No scoring
Matt Schmalz (2) - 4:22		First overtime period		No scoring
Michael McNiven (33 saves / 36 shots)		Goalie stats		Joseph Murdaca (33 saves / 37 shots)

April 24	Erie Otters	3 – 6	Owen Sound Attack	Bayshore Community Centre	Recap
Jordan Sambrook (3) - 4:20		First period	6:32 - Petrus Palmu (11); 7:43 - Jacob Friend (2)
Taylor Raddysh (8) - 10:09; Alex DeBrincat (9) - 19:09		Second period	2:04 - Ethan Szypula (4)
No scoring		Third period	9:04 - Maksim Sushko (3); 15:38 - Ethan Szypula (5); 19:42 - pp - en - Petrus Palmu (12)
Troy Timpano (22 saves / 27 shots)		Goalie stats	Michael McNiven (32 saves / 35 shots)

April 26	Erie Otters	4 – 3	Owen Sound Attack	Bayshore Community Centre	Recap
Jordan Sambrook (4) - 1:12; Kyle Maksimovich (5) - 11:55		First period	5:22 - pp - Jonah Gadjovich (4)
Anthony Cirelli (10) - pp - 1:40		Second period	5:26 - Matt Schmalz (3); 12:50 - Jonah Gadjovich (5)
Warren Foegele (7) - sh - 10:03		Third period	No scoring
Troy Timpano (27 saves / 30 shots)		Goalie stats	Michael McNiven (31 saves / 35 shots)

April 28	Owen Sound Attack	2 – 4	Erie Otters	Erie Insurance Arena	Recap
Aidan Dudas (1) - 15:07		First period	17:23 - Gera Poddubnyi (1)
Aidan Dudas (2) - 6:20		Second period	11:11 - Gera Poddubnyi (2); 19:46 - Jordan Sambrook (5)
No scoring		Third period	19:52 - en - Taylor Raddysh (9)
Michael McNiven (35 saves / 38 shots)		Goalie stats	Troy Timpano (23 saves / 25 shots)

April 30	Erie Otters	7 – 2	Owen Sound Attack	Bayshore Community Centre	Recap
Anthony Cirelli (11) - pp - 16:38		First period	5:58 - Aidan Dudas (3)
Darren Raddysh (8) - pp - 2:56; Anthony Cirelli (12) - 5:30; Dylan Strome (10) - 17:36		Second period	16:03 - Petrus Palmu (13)
Dylan Strome (11) - 5:26; Anthony Cirelli (13) - sh - 7:50; Warren Foegele (8) - 9:49		Third period	No scoring
Troy Timpano (31 saves / 33 shots)		Goalie stats	Michael McNiven (26 saves / 33 shots)

Erie wins series 4 – 2

=== J. Ross Robertson Cup ===
==== (W1) Erie Otters vs. (E2) Mississauga Steelheads ====
May 4	Mississauga Steelheads	1 – 2	Erie Otters	Erie Insurance Arena	Recap
No scoring		First period	No scoring
No scoring		Second period	5:38 - Warren Foegele (9); 14:45 - Dylan Strome (12)
Stefan LeBlanc (2) - 17:25		Third period	No scoring
Matthew Mancina (26 saves / 28 shots)		Goalie stats	Troy Timpano (13 saves / 14 shots)

May 7	Mississauga Steelheads	2 – 3	Erie Otters	Erie Insurance Arena	Recap
Ryan McLeod (4) - 16:14		First period	18:45 - pp - Alex DeBrincat (10)
No scoring		Second period	No scoring
Shaw Boomhower (1) - 19:31		Third period	18:03 - Warren Foegele (10); 18:53 - en - Alex DeBrincat (11)
Matthew Mancina (31 saves / 33 shots)		Goalie stats	Troy Timpano (22 saves / 24 shots)

May 8	Erie Otters	3 – 4	Mississauga Steelheads	Hershey Centre	Recap
No scoring		First period	6:17 - Ryan McLeod (5)
Alex DeBrincat (12) - pp - 7:46; Dylan Strome (13) - 11:57; Anthony Cirelli (14) - 19:25		Second period	2:23 - Trent Fox (6)
No scoring		Third period	9:03 - Nathan Bastian (7); 14:52 - pp - Michael McLeod (10)
Troy Timpano (27 saves / 31 shots)		Goalie stats	Matthew Mancina (23 saves / 26 shots)

May 10	Erie Otters	5 – 2	Mississauga Steelheads	Hershey Centre	Recap
Warren Foegele (11) - 0:27; Dylan Strome (14) - 4:08		First period	11:40 - sh - Owen Tippett (8)
No scoring		Second period	No scoring
Alex DeBrincat (13) - sh - 1:33; Warren Foegele (12) - 7:13; Warren Foegele (13) - en - 19:41		Third period	11:06 - Owen Tippett (9)
Troy Timpano (22 saves / 24 shots)		Goalie stats	Matthew Mancina (32 saves / 36 shots)

May 12	Mississauga Steelheads	3 – 4	OT	Erie Otters	Erie Insurance Arena	Recap
Spencer Watson (15) - 8:27; Michael McLeod (11) - 19:18		First period		No scoring
Owen Tippett (10) - 14:09		Second period		1:39 - Taylor Raddysh (10); 18:12 - pp - Taylor Raddysh (11)
No scoring		Third period		18:45 - Taylor Raddysh (12)
No scoring		First overtime period		2:41 - pp - Anthony Cirelli (15)
Matthew Mancina (39 saves / 43 shots)		Goalie stats		Troy Timpano (23 saves / 26 shots)

Erie wins series 4 – 1

=== J. Ross Robertson Cup champions roster ===
2016-17 Erie Otters
Goaltenders: (Canada) 30 – Joseph Murdaca; (Canada) 33 – Troy Timpano	Defencemen: (Canada) 2 – Mitchell Byrne; (Canada) 3 – Ryan Martin; (Canada) 6 – Jordan Sambrook; (Slovakia) 14 – Erik Černák; (Canada) 20 – Josh Wainman; (Canada) 24 – Darren Raddysh – A; (Canada) 25 – T. J. Fergus; (Canada) 47 – Owen Headrick; (Canada) 49 – Cameron Lizotte	Wingers: (Canada) 7 – Christian Girhiny; (Canada) 9 – Kyle Maksimovich; (United States) 12 – Alex DeBrincat – A; (Canada) 17 – Taylor Raddysh; (Canada) 21 – Patrick Fellows; (United States) 27 – Ivan Lodnia; (United States) 46 – Cade Robinson; (United States) 34 – Arthur Kaliyev; (Canada) 44 – MacKenzie Entwistle; (Canada) 81 – Liam Van Loon	Centres: (Canada) 8 – Carson Edwardson; (Canada) 15 – Kyle Pettit – A; (Canada) 19 – Dylan Strome – C; (Canada) 40 – Anthony Cirelli; (Canada) 37 – Warren Foegele; (Russia) 39 – Gera Poddubnyi; (Canada) 42 – Haydn Hopkins; Coach: (Canada) Kris Knoblauch; General Manager: (Canada) Dave Brown

=== Playoff scoring leaders ===
Note: GP = Games played; G = Goals; A = Assists; Pts = Points; PIM = Penalty minutes

Player	Team	GP	G	A	Pts	PIM
Alex DeBrincat	Erie Otters	22	13	25	38	10
Dylan Strome	Erie Otters	22	14	20	34	14
Anthony Cirelli	Erie Otters	22	15	16	31	4
Taylor Raddysh	Erie Otters	22	12	19	31	18
Michael McLeod	Mississauga Steelheads	20	11	16	27	19
Warren Foegele	Erie Otters	22	13	13	26	25
Spencer Watson	Mississauga Steelheads	20	15	10	25	14
Nick Suzuki	Owen Sound Attack	17	8	15	23	10
Darren Raddysh	Erie Otters	22	8	14	22	14
Petrus Palmu	Owen Sound Attack	17	13	8	21	6

=== Playoff leading goaltenders ===
Note: GP = Games played; Mins = Minutes played; W = Wins; L = Losses: OTL = Overtime losses; SL = Shootout losses; GA = Goals Allowed; SO = Shutouts; GAA = Goals against average

Player	Team	GP	Mins	W	L	GA	SO	Sv%	GAA
Joseph Raaymakers	Sault Ste. Marie Greyhounds	10	554	5	4	18	0	0.942	1.95
Matthew Mancina	Mississauga Steelheads	14	867	9	5	33	2	0.918	2.28
Michael DiPietro	Windsor Spitfires	7	436	3	4	18	0	0.917	2.48
Dylan Wells	Peterborough Petes	12	764	8	4	32	0	0.930	2.51
Jacob Ingham	Mississauga Steelheads	6	358	4	2	16	0	0.876	2.68

== Awards ==
J. Ross Robertson Cup:	Erie Otters
Hamilton Spectator Trophy:	Erie Otters
Bobby Orr Trophy:	Mississauga Steelheads
Wayne Gretzky Trophy:	Erie Otters
Emms Trophy:	Mississauga Steelheads
Leyden Trophy:	Peterborough Petes
Holody Trophy:	Erie Otters
Bumbacco Trophy:	Sault Ste. Marie Greyhounds
Red Tilson Trophy:	Alex DeBrincat, Erie Otters
Eddie Powers Memorial Trophy:	Alex DeBrincat, Erie Otters
Matt Leyden Trophy:	Ryan McGill, Owen Sound Attack
Jim Mahon Memorial Trophy:	Alex DeBrincat, Erie Otters
Max Kaminsky Trophy:	Darren Raddysh, Erie Otters
OHL Goaltender of the Year:	Michael McNiven, Owen Sound Attack
Jack Ferguson Award:	Ryan Suzuki, Barrie Colts
Dave Pinkney Trophy:	Michael McNiven & Emanuel Vella, Owen Sound Attack
Emms Family Award:	Ryan Merkley, Guelph Storm
F. W. "Dinty" Moore Trophy:	Matt Villalta, Sault Ste. Marie Greyhounds
Dan Snyder Memorial Trophy:	Garrett McFadden, Guelph Storm
William Hanley Trophy:	Nick Suzuki, Owen Sound Attack
Leo Lalonde Memorial Trophy:	Darren Raddysh, Erie Otters
Bobby Smith Trophy:	Sasha Chmelevski, Ottawa 67's
Roger Neilson Memorial Award:	Stephen Gibson, Mississauga Steelheads
Ivan Tennant Memorial Award:	Quinn Hanna, Guelph Storm
Mickey Renaud Captain's Trophy:	Alex Peters, Flint Firebirds
Tim Adams Memorial Trophy:	Mike Petizian, Mississauga Reps
Wayne Gretzky 99 Award:	Warren Foegele, Erie Otters

== All-Star teams ==
The OHL All-Star Teams were selected by the OHL's General Managers.

=== First team ===
- Dylan Strome, Centre, Erie Otters
- Adam Mascherin, Left Wing, Kitchener Rangers
- Alex DeBrincat, Right Wing, Erie Otters
- Santino Centorame, Defence, Owen Sound Attack
- Darren Raddysh, Defence, Erie Otters
- Michael McNiven, Goaltender, Owen Sound Attack
- Ryan McGill, Coach, Owen Sound Attack

=== Second team ===
- Nick Suzuki, Centre, Owen Sound Attack
- Petrus Palmu, Right Wing, Owen Sound Attack
- Ryan Mantha, Defence, Niagara IceDogs
- Mikhail Sergachev, Defence, Windsor Spitfires
- Tyler Parsons, Goaltender, London Knights
- Kris Knoblauch, Coach, Erie Otters

=== Third team ===
- Cliff Pu, Centre, London Knights
- Kevin Hancock, Left Wing, Owen Sound Attack
- Taylor Raddysh, Right Wing, Erie Otters
- Filip Hronek, Defence, Saginaw Spirit
- Olli Juolevi, Defence, London Knights
- Michael DiPietro, Goaltender, Windsor Spitfires
- Drew Bannister, Coach, Sault Ste. Marie Greyhounds

== 2017 OHL Priority Selection ==
On April 8, 2017, the OHL conducted the 2017 Ontario Hockey League Priority Selection. The Barrie Colts held the first overall pick in the draft, and selected Ryan Suzuki from the London Jr. Knights of the MHAO. Suzuki was awarded the Jack Ferguson Award, awarded to the top pick in the draft.

Below are the players who were selected in the first round of the 2017 Ontario Hockey League Priority Selection.

#	Player	Nationality	OHL team	Hometown	Minor team
1	Ryan Suzuki (C)	Canada	Barrie Colts	London, Ontario	London Jr. Knights (MHAO)
2	Tag Bertuzzi (C)	Canada	Guelph Storm	Birmingham, Michigan	Oakland Jr. Grizzlies 16U (HPHL)
3	Brandon Coe (RW)	Canada	North Bay Battalion	Ajax, Ontario	Toronto Nationals (GTHL)
4	Nicholas Porco (LW)	Canada	Saginaw Spirit	Sault Ste. Marie, Ontario	Vaughan Kings (GTHL)
5	Philip Tomasino (C)	Canada	Niagara IceDogs	Mississauga, Ontario	Mississauga Rebels (GTHL)
6	Graeme Clarke (RW)	Canada	Ottawa 67's	Ottawa, Ontario	Toronto Marlboros (GTHL)
7	Blake Murray (C)	Canada	Sudbury Wolves	Uxbridge, Ontario	Whitby Wildcats (OMHA-EHL)
8	Jack Hughes (C)	United States	Mississauga Steelheads	Orlando, Florida	Toronto Marlboros (GTHL)
9	Jamieson Rees (C)	Canada	Sarnia Sting	Vaughan, Ontario	Mississauga Reps (GTHL)
10	Ethan Keppen (LW)	Canada	Flint Firebirds	Whitby, Ontario	Toronto Nationals (GTHL)
11	Connor McMichael (C)	Canada	Hamilton Bulldogs	Ajax, Ontario	Ajax-Pickering Raiders (OMHA-EHL)
12	Cody Morgan (C)	Canada	Kingston Frontenacs	Richmond Hill, Ontario	Toronto Jr. Canadiens (GTHL)
13	Grayson Ladd (D)	Canada	Kitchener Rangers	Dresden, Ontario	Chatham-Kent Cyclones (MHAO)
14	Thomas Harley (D)	United States	Mississauga Steelheads	Syracuse, New York	Vaughan Kings (GTHL)
15	Mitchell Brewer (D)	Canada	Oshawa Generals	Waterdown, Ontario	Halton Hills Hurricanes (OMHA-SCTA)
16	Nick Robertson (C)	United States	Peterborough Petes	Northville, Michigan	Toronto Red Wings (GTHL)
17	Nathan Staios (RW)	/ (United States) Canada/USA	Windsor Spitfires	Oakville, Ontario	Vaughan Kings (GTHL)
18	Lucas Rowe (C)	Canada	London Knights	Toronto, Ontario	Mississauga Reps (GTHL)
19	Hayden Fowler (C)	Canada	Sault Ste. Marie Greyhounds	Kingston, Ontario	Kingston Jr. Frontenacs (OMHA-EHL)
20	Mitchell Russell (C)	Canada	Owen Sound Attack	Barrie, Ontario	Barrie Jr. Colts (OMHA-EHL)
21	Emmett Sproule (C)	Canada	Erie Otters	Nottawa, Ontario	Grey-Bruce Highlanders (OMHA-SCTA)

== 2017 NHL entry draft ==
On June 23–24, 2017, the National Hockey League conducted the 2017 NHL entry draft held at the United Center in Chicago, Illinois. In total, 42 players from the OHL were selected in the draft. Owen Tippett of the Mississauga Steelheads was the first player from the OHL to be selected, taken tenth overall by the Florida Panthers.

Below are the players selected from OHL teams at the NHL Entry Draft.

Round	#	Player	Nationality	NHL team	Hometown	OHL team
1	10	Owen Tippett (RW)	Canada	Florida Panthers	Peterborough, Ontario	Mississauga Steelheads
1	11	Gabriel Vilardi (C)	Canada	Los Angeles Kings	Kingston, Ontario	Windsor Spitfires
1	13	Nick Suzuki (C)	Canada	Vegas Golden Knights	London, Ontario	Owen Sound Attack
1	20	Robert Thomas (C)	Canada	St. Louis Blues	Aurora, Ontario	London Knights
1	27	Morgan Frost (C)	Canada	Philadelphia Flyers	Aurora, Ontario	Sault Ste. Marie Greyhounds
2	32	Conor Timmins (D)	Canada	Colorado Avalanche	Thorold, Ontario	Sault Ste. Marie Greyhounds
2	34	Nicolas Hague (D)	Canada	Vegas Golden Knights	Kitchener, Ontario	Mississauga Steelheads
2	35	Isaac Ratcliffe (LW)	Canada	Philadelphia Flyers	London, Ontario	Guelph Storm
2	39	Jason Robertson (RW)	United States	Dallas Stars	Northville, Michigan	Kingston Frontenacs
2	47	Alex Formenton (LW)	Canada	Ottawa Senators	King City, Ontario	London Knights
2	53	Jack Studnicka (C)	Canada	Boston Bruins	Tecumseh, Ontario	Oshawa Generals
2	55	Jonah Gadjovich (LW)	Canada	Vancouver Canucks	Whitby, Ontario	Owen Sound Attack
2	59	Eemeli Rasanen (D)	Finland	Toronto Maple Leafs	Joensuu, Finland	Kingston Frontenacs
3	64	Michael DiPietro (G)	Canada	Vancouver Canucks	Amherstburg, Ontario	Windsor Spitfires
3	69	MacKenzie Entwistle (RW)	Canada	Arizona Coyotes	Georgetown, Ontario	Hamilton Bulldogs
3	72	Matthew Villalta (G)	Canada	Los Angeles Kings	Godfrey, Ontario	Sault Ste. Marie Greyhounds
3	75	Nate Schnarr (C)	Canada	Arizona Coyotes	Waterloo, Ontario	Guelph Storm
3	83	Zach Gallant (C)	Canada	Detroit Red Wings	Oakville, Ontario	Peterborough Petes
3	84	Dmitri Samorukov (D)	Russia	Edmonton Oilers	Volgograd, Russia	Guelph Storm
3	85	Ivan Lodnia (RW)	United States	Minnesota Wild	Novi, Michigan	Erie Otters
4	101	Liam Hawel (C)	Canada	Dallas Stars	Arnprior, Ontario	Guelph Storm
4	106	Matthew Strome (LW)	Canada	Philadelphia Flyers	Mississauga, Ontario	Hamilton Bulldogs
4	107	Maksim Sushko (RW)	Belarus	Philadelphia Flyers	Brest, Belarus	Owen Sound Attack
4	108	Noel Hoefenmayer (D)	Canada	Arizona Coyotes	Toronto, Ontario	Ottawa 67's
4	109	Adam Ruzicka (C)	Slovakia	Calgary Flames	Bratislava, Slovakia	Sarnia Sting
4	118	Markus Phillips (D)	Canada	Los Angeles Kings	Toronto, Ontario	Owen Sound Attack
4	123	Brandon Crawley (D)	United States	New York Rangers	Glen Rock, New Jersey	London Knights
5	131	Cole Fraser (D)	Canada	Detroit Red Wings	Beckwith, Ontario	Peterborough Petes
5	138	Drake Rymsha (C)	United States	Los Angeles Kings	Huntington Woods, Michigan	Sarnia Sting
5	141	Fedor Gordeev (D)	Canada	Toronto Maple Leafs	Toronto, Ontario	Flint Firebirds
5	143	Marian Studenic (RW)	Slovakia	New Jersey Devils	Holíč, Slovakia	Hamilton Bulldogs
5	146	Kirill Maksimov (RW)	Russia	Edmonton Oilers	Moscow, Russia	Niagara IceDogs
5	147	Jacob Golden (D)	Canada	Minnesota Wild	Toronto, Ontario	London Knights
6	164	Reilly Webb (D)	Canada	Detroit Red Wings	Hamilton, Ontario	Hamilton Bulldogs
6	172	Ryan McGregor (LW)	Canada	Toronto Maple Leafs	Burlington, Ontario	Sarnia Sting
6	175	Trenton Bourque (D)	Canada	St. Louis Blues	Burlington, Ontario	Owen Sound Attack
6	181	Petrus Palmu (RW)	Finland	Vancouver Canucks	Joensuu, Finland	Owen Sound Attack
6	185	Sasha Chmelevski (C)	United States	San Jose Sharks	Northville, Michigan	Ottawa 67's
7	188	Matt Brassard (D)	Canada	Vancouver Canucks	Barrie, Ontario	Oshawa Generals
7	189	Ben Jones (C)	Canada	Vegas Golden Knights	Waterloo, Ontario	Niagara IceDogs
7	193	Brady Gilmour (C)	Canada	Detroit Red Wings	Grafton, Ontario	Saginaw Spirit
7	216	Jacob Paquette (D)	Canada	Nashville Predators	Ottawa, Ontario	Kingston Frontenacs

== 2017 CHL Import Draft ==
On June 28, 2017, the Canadian Hockey League conducted the 2017 CHL Import Draft, in which teams in all three CHL leagues participate in. The Barrie Colts held the first pick in the draft by a team in the OHL, and selected Andrei Svechnikov from Russia with their selection.

Below are the players who were selected in the first round by Ontario Hockey League teams in the 2017 CHL Import Draft.

#	Player	Nationality	OHL team	Hometown	Last team
1	Andrei Svechnikov (RW)	Russia	Barrie Colts	Barnaul, Russia	Muskegon Lumberjacks
4	Alexei Toropchenko (RW)	Russia	Guelph Storm	Balashikha, Russia	HK MVD Balashikha
7	Filip Chytil (C)	Czech Republic	North Bay Battalion	Zlín, Czech Republic	PSG Zlin
10	Martin Necas (C)	Czech Republic	Saginaw Spirit	Nové Město na Moravě, Czech Republic	HC Kometa Brno
13	Timothy Liljegren (D)	Sweden	Mississauga Steelheads	Kristianstad, Sweden	Rogle BK
16	Nikita Okhotiuk (D)	Russia	Ottawa 67's	Chelyabinsk, Russia	Belye Medvedi
19	Zack Malik (D)	Czech Republic	Sudbury Wolves	Brno, Czech Republic	Vitkovice Ostrava Jr.
22	Hugo Leufvenius (C)	Sweden	Sarnia Sting	Stockholm, Sweden	Linkoping HC Jr.
25	Nikita Alexandrov (D)	Russia	Flint Firebirds	Kurgan, Russia	HK MVD Balashikha
28	Joni Ikonen (C)	Finland	Hamilton Bulldogs	Espoo, Finland	Frolunda HC Jr.
31	No selection made		Kingston Frontenacs		
34	Adam Liska (C/LW)	Slovakia	Kitchener Rangers	Bratislava, Slovakia	HK Orange 20
37	Albert Michnac (LW)	Czech Republic	Mississauga Steelheads	Prague, Czech Republic	Guelph Storm
40	Nico Gross (D)	Switzerland	Oshawa Generals	Pontresina, Switzerland	Zug EV Jr.
43	Gleb Babintsev (D)	Russia	Peterborough Petes	Moscow, Russia	Metallurg Magnitogorsk U17
46	Kirill Kozhevnikov (C)	Russia	Windsor Spitfires	Yugra, Russia	Khanty-Mansiysk Mamonty
49	Jesper Bratt (RW)	Sweden	London Knights	Stockholm, Sweden	AIK IF
52	Rasmus Sandin (D)	Sweden	Sault Ste. Marie Greyhounds	Uppsala, Sweden	Brynas IF Jr.
55	Vasili Filyayev (C)	Belarus	Owen Sound Attack	Zhlobin, Belarus	Team Belarus U17
57	Stephane Patry (LW)	Switzerland	Erie Otters	Geneva, Switzerland	Geneve-Servette HC Jr.

Preceded by 2015–16 OHL season	OHL seasons	Succeeded by 2017–18 OHL season
