= Jeremy Brodeur =

American ice hockey player (born 1996)

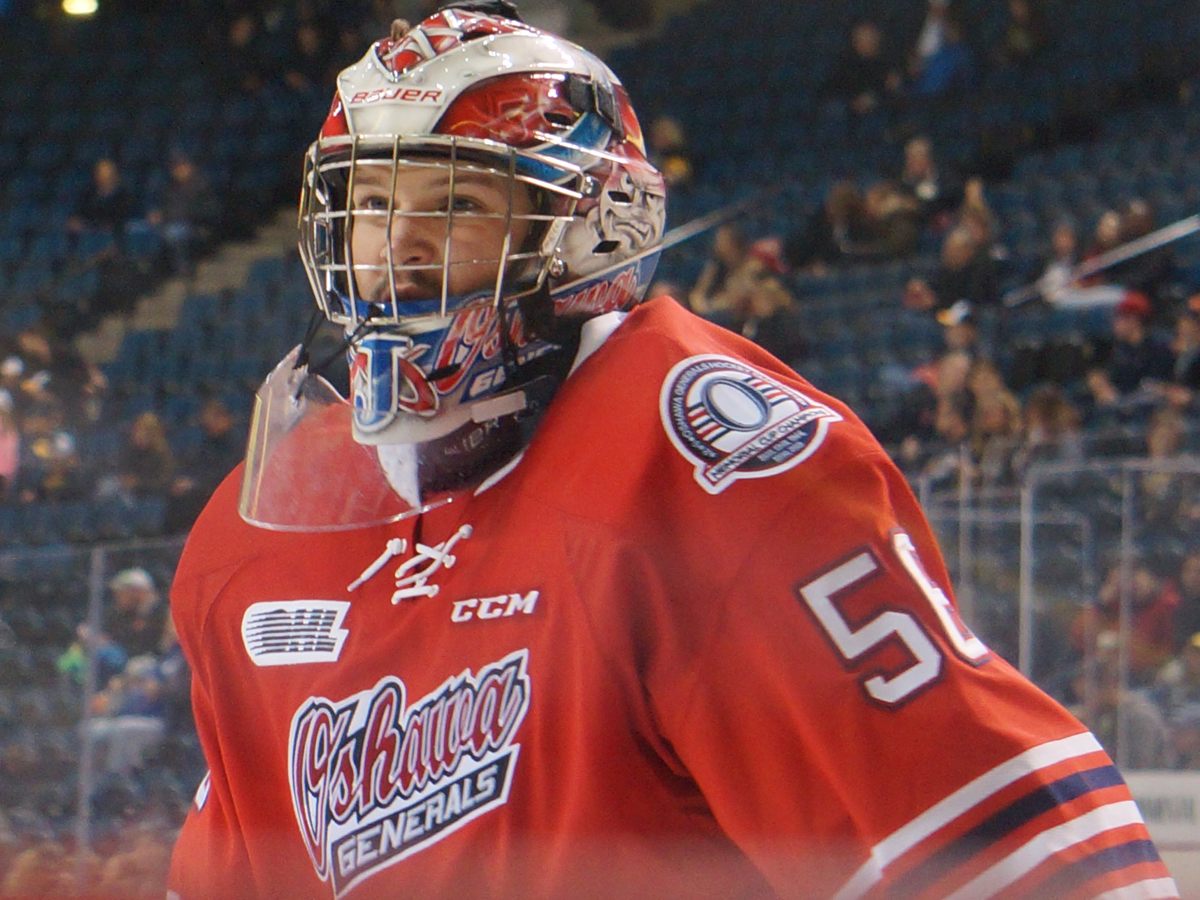
- Brodeur with the Oshawa Generals in 2016
- Born: October 29, 1996 (age 29) Essex Fells, New Jersey, U.S.
- Height: 6 ft 1 in (185 cm)
- Weight: 186 lb (84 kg; 13 st 4 lb)
- Position: Goaltender
- Catches: Left
- AHL team (P) Cur. team Former teams: Utica Comets; Adirondack Thunder (ECHL); Binghamton Devils; Providence Bruins; Manchester Storm
- NHL draft: Undrafted
- Playing career: 2017–present

Jeremy Brodeur (born October 29, 1996) is a Canadian-American professional ice hockey goaltender who is currently playing for the Adirondack Thunder of the ECHL while under contract to the Utica Comets of the American Hockey League (AHL).

== Playing career ==
=== Junior ===
Brodeur spent three years playing his junior hockey in the Ontario Hockey League (OHL) for the Oshawa Generals, drafted by the team in 2013 in the eighth round. As a member of the Generals, Brodeur had a 2.78 goals-against average and .904 save percentage, becoming the franchise's all-time leader in shutouts along with winning the OHL Championship and Memorial Cup in 2014–15.

He played in prospect camps for the Columbus Blue Jackets and the Dallas Stars, but did not sign with either team. Brodeur joined the New York Rangers on a professional try out, but was released after the first preseason game against his father's former team, the New Jersey Devils.

=== Professional ===
He signed with the Toledo Walleye of the ECHL after the end of the OHL's 2016–17 season, but did not appear in a game. In 2017–18, he signed with the Allen Americans in the ECHL. He was then acquired off waivers by the Norfolk Admirals during the 2018–19 season.

In 2019, Brodeur signed with the Atlanta Gladiators but departed the team prior to the start of the regular season to play with the Peoria Rivermen of the Southern Professional Hockey League.

After a short stint in 2020 with UK EIHL side Sheffield Steelers, Brodeur returned to the SPHL and signed with Knoxville Ice Bears in October 2020. In January 2021, and after posting a shutout in his first start of the season, Brodeur signed an AHL contract with Binghamton Devils of the American Hockey League. In April 2022, Brodeur made his first AHL start with an incredible 47 save performance on 50 shots against division leading Hershey Bears and was named the game's third star.

By the timeframe of the late summer and early autumn of 2021, Brodeur had made an appearance for the Boston Bruins as a potential goaltending prospect, initially at the tri-team "2021 Prospects Challenge" tryouts, held in Buffalo, New York between the NHL prospects of the Boston Bruins, Buffalo Sabres and his father's former team, the New Jersey Devils and under a week later, at the Warrior Ice Arena, the practice rink of the Bruins, Brodeur was listed as one of the goaltending participants in the Bruins' official 2021 training camp roster.

As a free agent from the Devils, Brodeur was signed to a AHL contract over the summer with the Providence Bruins of the AHL and split the 2021–22 season between the Bruins and the Maine Mariners of the ECHL.

On September 6, 2022, Brodeur continued his career in the ECHL, signing a contract with the Norfolk Admirals. After a spell with the South Carolina Stingrays, Brodeur signed for UK EIHL side Manchester Storm in November 2022.

On July 6, 2023, Brodeur returned to the Devils' minor league system, signing with the Utica Comets.

== Personal life ==
Brodeur was born in Essex Fells, New Jersey, when his father, Martin was a member of the New Jersey Devils. His brother Anthony has also played professional hockey as a goaltender.

== Career statistics ==
=== Regular season and playoffs ===
			Regular season									Playoffs
Season	Team	League	GP	W	L	OTL	MIN	GA	SO	GAA	SV%	GP	W	L	MIN	GA	SO	GAA	SV%
2013–14	Shattuck-Saint Mary's Sabres	HS-MN	25	—	—	—	—	—	—	2.18	.919	—	—	—	—	—	—	—	—
2014–15	Oshawa Generals	OHL	19	13	4	2	1118	46	3	2.47	.900	2	0	0	18	1	0	3.44	.500
2015–16	Oshawa Generals	OHL	54	24	22	5	3086	149	6	2.90	.905	4	1	2	162	15	0	5.57	.868
2016–17	Oshawa Generals	OHL	51	33	14	3	2849	149	2	2.84	.916	10	5	4	560	31	0	3.33	.907
2017–18	Allen Americans	ECHL	39	15	13	4	1942	102	0	3.15	.917	1	—	—	—	—	—	—	—
2018–19	Allen Americans	ECHL	14	0	9	0	558	38	0	4.09	.888	—	—	—	—	—	—	—	—
2018–19	Norfolk Admirals	ECHL	7	0	5	1	360	26	0	4.34	.885	—	—	—	—	—	—	—	—
2019–20	Peoria Rivermen	SPHL	6	5	1	0	357	11	1	1.85	.944	—	—	—	—	—	—	—	—
2019–20	HK Budapest	Erste Liga	7	—	—	—	376	19	—	3.04	.915	—	—	—	—	—	—	—	—
2020–21	Knoxville Ice Bears	SPHL	1	1	0	0	60	0	1	0.00	1.00	—	—	—	—	—	—	—	—
2020–21	Binghamton Devils	AHL	3	0	2	1	182	9	0	2.97	.922	—	—	—	—	—	—	—	—
2021–22	Maine Mariners	ECHL	37	16	12	5	2066	108	0	3.14	.907	2	1	0	51	0	1	0.00	1.00
2021–22	Providence Bruins	AHL	1	0	0	0	20	1	0	3.03	.917	—	—	—	—	—	—	—	—
2022–23	South Carolina Stingrays	ECHL	2	1	0	0	64	5	0	4.75	.821	—	—	—	—	—	—	—	—
2022–23	Manchester Storm	EIHL	36	16	20	0	2104	117	1	3.34	.917	2	0	1	117	7	0	3.59	.914
2023–24	Adirondack Thunder	ECHL	32	18	9	3	1897	81	2	2.56	.918	6	3	1	268	11	0	2.47	.917
2023–24	Utica Comets	AHL	1	0	1	0	53	2	0	2.26	.909	—	—	—	—	—	—	—	—
2024–25	Adirondack Thunder	ECHL	24	11	11	1	1369	66	4	2.89	.905	—	—	—	—	—	—	—	—
2024–25	Utica Comets	AHL	5	4	0	0	278	10	0	2.16	.923	—	—	—	—	—	—	—	—
2025–26	Adirondack Thunder	ECHL	41	23	12	5	2475	111	1	2.69	.908	7	3	4	434	18	0	2.49	.926
2025–26	Utica Comets	AHL	1	0	1	0	58	3	0	3.08	.914	—	—	—	—	—	—	—	—
AHL totals			11	4	4	1	591	25	0	2.54	.921	—	—	—	—	—	—	—	—

== Awards and honors ==
Award	Year
CHL / OHL
Memorial Cup champion	2015
J. Ross Robertson Cup champion	2015
Dave Pinkney Trophy (lowest goals against average)	2015
ECHL
Goaltender of the Week (January 3)	2022
3ICE
Grant Fuhr Goalie of the Year Award	2022
