= Kirill Maksimov =

Russian ice hockey player

- Born: June 1, 1999 (age 26) Moscow, Russia
- Height: 6 ft 3 in (191 cm)
- Weight: 192 lb (87 kg; 13 st 10 lb)
- Position: Right wing
- Shoots: Right
- AlpsHL team Former teams: Kitzbüheler EC; Bakersfield Condors; CSKA Moscow; Mikkelin Jukurit; Barys Astana; Torpedo Nizhny Novgorod; Admiral Vladivostok; Yugra Khanty-Mansiysk; Metallurg Novokuznetsk
- NHL draft: 146th overall, 2017; Edmonton Oilers
- Playing career: 2019–present

Kirill Maksimov (Russian: Кирилл Максимов; born June 1, 1999) is a Russian-Canadian professional ice hockey winger who currently plays for Kitzbüheler EC of the Alps Hockey League (AlpsHL). He was drafted by the Edmonton Oilers in the 2017 NHL entry draft and played in the Ontario Hockey League for the Saginaw Spirit and Niagara IceDogs.

== Career statistics ==
=== Regular season and playoffs ===
			Regular season					Playoffs
Season	Team	League	GP	G	A	Pts	PIM	GP	G	A	Pts	PIM
2015–16	Saginaw Spirit	OHL	54	6	15	21	18	4	1	2	3	2
2016–17	Saginaw Spirit	OHL	37	6	10	16	26	—	—	—	—	—
2016–17	Niagara IceDogs	OHL	29	15	7	22	15	4	4	0	4	6
2017–18	Niagara IceDogs	OHL	62	34	46	80	72	10	4	6	10	16
2018–19	Niagara IceDogs	OHL	63	40	39	79	118	2	0	0	0	4
2019–20	Bakersfield Condors	AHL	53	5	8	13	34	—	—	—	—	—
2020–21	CSKA Moscow	KHL	16	2	1	3	2	—	—	—	—	—
2020–21	Zvezda Moscow	VHL	25	12	15	27	36	5	1	2	3	10
2021-22	Mikkelin Jukurit	Liiga	26	4	4	8	14	2	0	1	1	2
KHL totals			16	2	1	3	2	—	—	—	—	—

=== International ===
Year	Team	Event	Result	GP	G	A	Pts	PIM
2016	Russia	U18	6th	4	0	0	0	0
2017	Russia	U18	3rd place, bronze medalist(s)	7	3	0	3	2
Junior totals				11	3	0	3	2
