= Dylan Wells =

Canadian ice hockey player

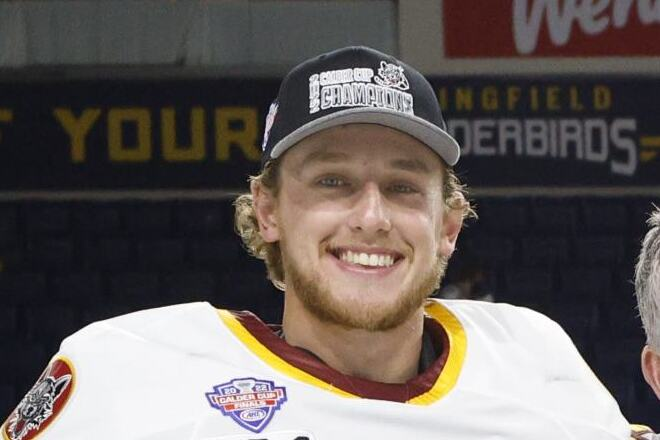
- Wells with the Chicago Wolves in 2022
- Born: January 3, 1998 (age 28) St. Catharines, Ontario, Canada
- Height: 6 ft 2 in (188 cm)
- Weight: 190 lb (86 kg; 13 st 8 lb)
- Position: Goaltender
- Catches: Left
- team Former teams: Free agent Chicago Blackhawks
- NHL draft: 123rd overall, 2016; Edmonton Oilers
- Playing career: 2018–present

Dylan Wells (born January 3, 1998) is a Canadian professional ice hockey goaltender who is currently an unrestricted free agent. He most recently played under contract with the Tucson Roadrunners in the American Hockey League (AHL).

== Playing career ==
Wells played junior hockey with the Peterborough Petes in the Ontario Hockey League (OHL) and was drafted by the Edmonton Oilers, in the fifth-round, 123rd overall, in the 2016 NHL entry draft. He was signed to a three-year, entry-level contract with the Oilers on May 18, 2017.

During his tenure within the Oilers organization, Wells played between minor-league affiliates, the Bakersfield Condors of the AHL and the Wichita Thunder of the ECHL.

Having spent the majority of the pandemic affected 2020–21 season on the Oilers taxi squad, Wells was traded at the conclusion of the season to the Carolina Hurricanes in exchange for future considerations on July 15, 2021. With his entry-level contract completed, Wells remained within the Hurricanes organization after signing a one-year AHL contract with affiliate, the Chicago Wolves, on August 11, 2021.

Wells spent the majority of the 2021–22 season playing with the Wolves ECHL affiliate, the Norfolk Admirals, appearing in 43 games for 18 wins.

As a free agent from the Wolves, Wells opted to continue his professional career in the AHL after agreeing to a one-year contract with the Rockford IceHogs on July 14, 2022. Beginning the 2022–23 season with the IceHogs, Wells was signed to a one-year NHL contract by the Chicago Blackhawks on November 5, 2022, due to a rash of injuries. Serving as the Blackhawks' backup goaltender he surprisingly made his NHL debut, called into the game in a relief appearance against the Winnipeg Jets on November 5, 2022. He made 12 saves from 13 shots in the third period of a 4–0 defeat. Following his debut he was returned to the IceHogs on November 8.

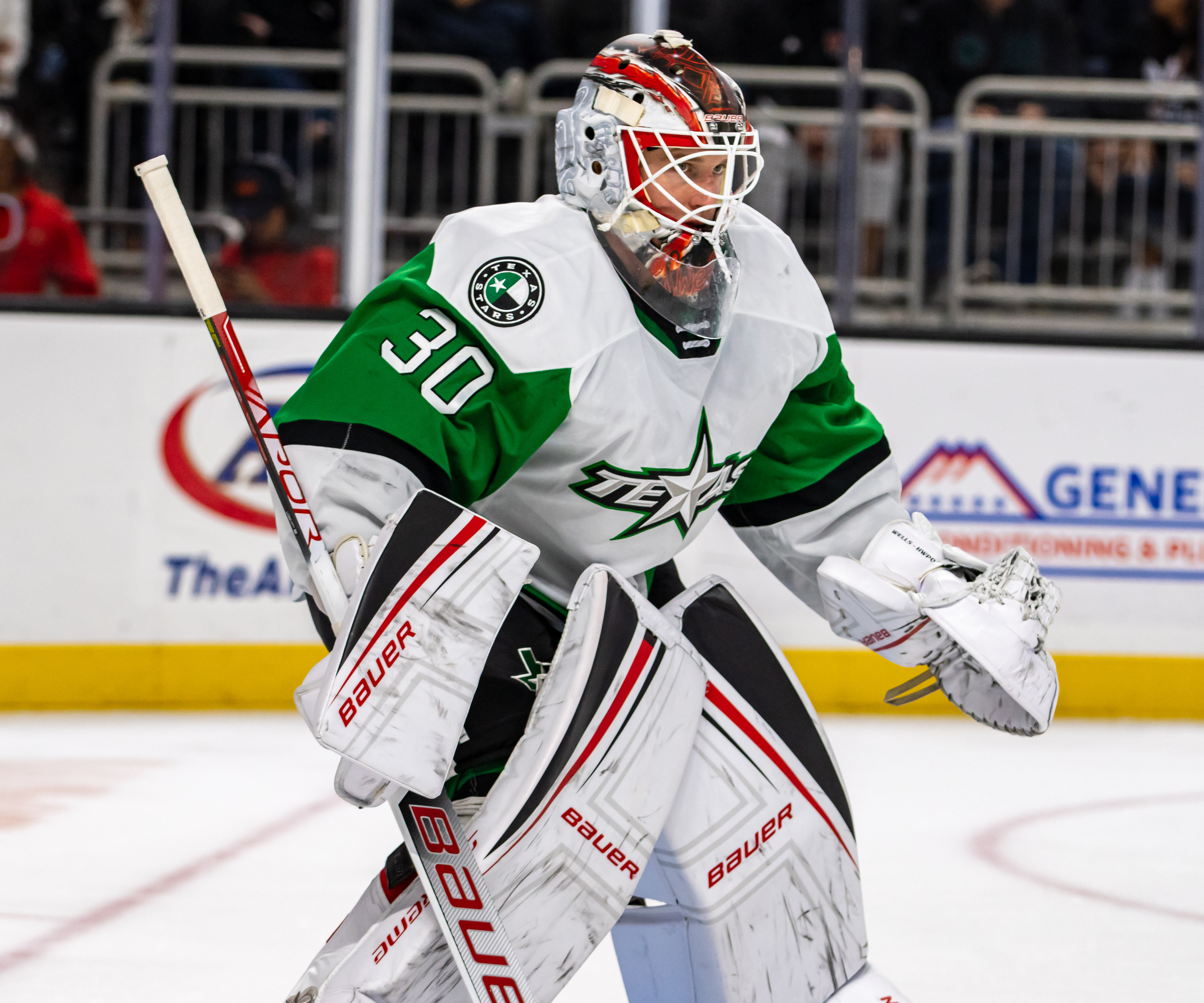
Wells with the Texas Stars in 2023.

On March 2, 2023, the Blackhawks traded Wells along with Max Domi to the Dallas Stars in exchange for Anton Khudobin and a second-round pick in the 2025 NHL Entry Draft.

Having concluded the remainder of his contract with the Stars, Wells left the club as a free agent in the off-season. On August 31, 2023, Wells accepted an invite to attend the Nashville Predators 2023 training camp on a professional tryout deal. Later released from his tryout with the Predators, Wells returned to the Idaho Steelheads of the ECHL to commence the 2023–24 season on October 18, 2023. Posting 7 wins in as many games for the Steelheads, Wells was signed to a PTO with the Tucson Roadrunners of the AHL on November 23, 2023.

== Career statistics ==
=== Regular season and playoffs ===
			Regular season									Playoffs
Season	Team	League	GP	W	L	OT	MIN	GA	SO	GAA	SV%	GP	W	L	MIN	GA	SO	GAA	SV%
2014–15	Peterborough Petes	OHL	27	7	15	4	1471	97	0	3.96	.893	—	—	—	—	—	—	—	—
2015–16	Peterborough Petes	OHL	27	9	13	3	1516	116	0	4.59	.871	—	—	—	—	—	—	—	—
2016–17	Peterborough Petes	OHL	52	33	15	2	3026	155	1	3.07	.916	12	8	4	764	32	0	2.51	.903
2017–18	Peterborough Petes	OHL	56	20	30	3	3230	195	1	3.62	.896	—	—	—	—	—	—	—	—
2017–18	Wichita Thunder	ECHL	1	0	1	0	11	3	0	16.39	.571	—	—	—	—	—	—	—	—
2018–19	Bakersfield Condors	AHL	12	6	6	0	718	34	1	2.84	.909	1	0	1	59	3	0	3.03	.921
2018–19	Wichita Thunder	ECHL	22	12	5	2	1206	61	1	3.04	.912	—	—	—	—	—	—	—	—
2019–20	Wichita Thunder	ECHL	10	3	6	1	579	48	0	4.98	.871	—	—	—	—	—	—	—	—
2019–20	Bakersfield Condors	AHL	7	0	4	1	366	23	0	3.77	.878	—	—	—	—	—	—	—	—
2021–22	Norfolk Admirals	ECHL	43	18	21	2	2492	149	0	3.59	.895	—	—	—	—	—	—	—	—
2021–22	Chicago Wolves	AHL	3	1	1	1	179	9	0	3.01	.893	—	—	—	—	—	—	—	—
2022–23	Rockford IceHogs	AHL	17	9	6	1	912	45	0	2.96	.905	—	—	—	—	—	—	—	—
2022–23	Chicago Blackhawks	NHL	1	0	0	0	20	1	0	3.00	.923	—	—	—	—	—	—	—	—
2022–23	Texas Stars	AHL	3	0	1	0	101	9	0	5.35	.839	—	—	—	—	—	—	—	—
2022–23	Idaho Steelheads	ECHL	2	2	0	0	120	4	0	1.99	.934	—	—	—	—	—	—	—	—
2023–24	Idaho Steelheads	ECHL	7	7	0	0	421	23	0	3.27	.894	—	—	—	—	—	—	—	—
2023–24	Tucson Roadrunners	AHL	18	10	5	3	1062	58	1	3.28	.898	—	—	—	—	—	—	—	—
2024–25	Allen Americans	ECHL	20	7	9	3	1106	70	0	3.80	.896	—	—	—	—	—	—	—	—
2024–25	Tucson Roadrunners	AHL	10	3	3	1	457	22	0	2.89	.900	—	—	—	—	—	—	—	—
2025–26	Utah Grizzlies	ECHL	22	7	13	2	1260	89	1	4.24	.874	—	—	—	—	—	—	—	—
2025–26	Kansas City Mavericks	ECHL	12	9	3	0	715	22	3	1.85	.928	9	7	2	565	19	1	2.02	.923
NHL totals			1	0	0	0	20	1	0	3.00	.923	—	—	—	—	—	—	—	—

=== International ===
Year	Team	Event	Result	GP	W	L	T	MIN	GA	SO	GAA	SV%
2014	Canada Red	U17	6th	3	1	2	0	175	11	1	3.78	.838
2015	Canada	IH18	1st place, gold medalist(s)	3	3	0	0	185	4	1	1.30	.924
Junior totals				6	4	2	0	360	15	2	2.50	.901

== Awards and honours ==
Award	Year
CHL
CHL Top Prospects Game	2016
