= Matt Luff =

Canadian ice hockey player (born 1997)

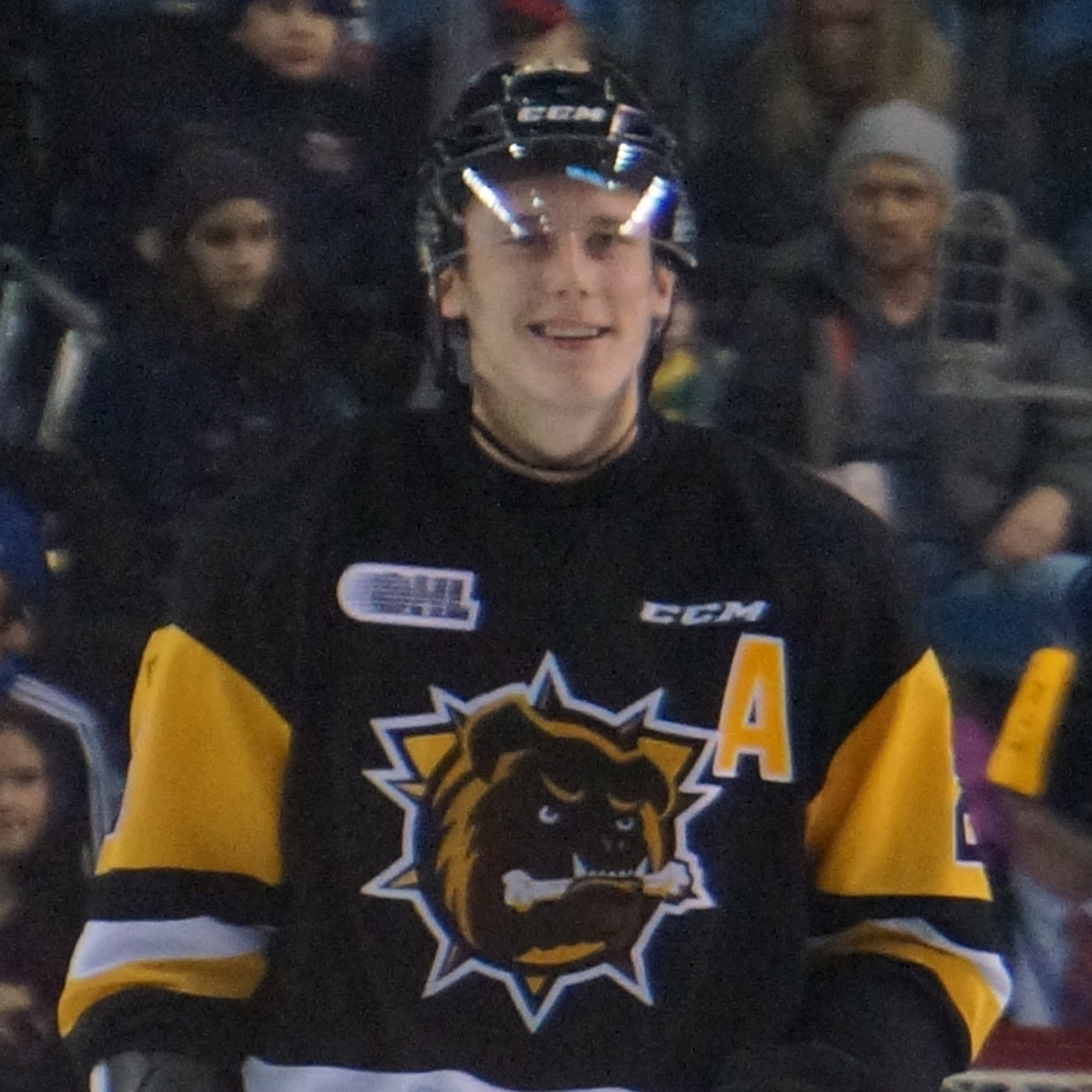
- Luff with the Hamilton Bulldogs
- Born: May 5, 1997 (age 29) Oakville, Ontario, Canada
- Height: 6 ft 2 in (188 cm)
- Weight: 190 lb (86 kg; 13 st 8 lb)
- Position: Winger
- Shoots: Right
- NHL team (P) Cur. team Former teams: New York Islanders; Hamilton Hammers (AHL); Los Angeles Kings; Nashville Predators; Detroit Red Wings; St. Louis Blues
- NHL draft: Undrafted
- Playing career: 2017–present

Matt Luff (born May 5, 1997) is a Canadian professional ice hockey player who is a winger for the Hamilton Hammers of the American Hockey League (AHL) while under contract to the New York Islanders of the National Hockey League (NHL). Undrafted, he has played for the Los Angeles Kings, Nashville Predators, Detroit Red Wings, and the St. Louis Blues.

== Playing career ==
=== Amateur ===
Coming off a successful season with the Oakville Rangers Midget AAA, Luff split his time between the Rangers and the Oakville Blades of the Ontario Junior Hockey League for the 2013–14 season. On June 9, 2014, Luff signed a contract with the Blades for the 2014–15 season, however he chose to commit to the Belleville Bulls of the Ontario Hockey League who had drafted him in the OHL Draft. In his rookie year with the Bulls, Luff was named a finalist for the Rookie of the Year, with the award eventually going to Alex DeBrincat. Following the 2014–15 season, the Bulls were renamed the Hamilton Bulldogs.

=== Professional ===
==== Los Angeles Kings ====
After going undrafted in the NHL entry draft, Luff attended the Los Angeles Kings development and training camp as a free agent. He eventually signed a three-year entry-level contract with the Kings on September 23, 2016, becoming the first Bulldog to sign an NHL contract. Luff returned to the OHL for the 2016–17 season where he played only 45 games due to a shoulder injury and concussion. Despite his shortened season, Luff was reassigned to the Kings American Hockey League (AHL) affiliate, the Ontario Reign on April 7, 2017.

Luff began the 2018–19 season with the Ontario Reign after being assigned there from the Kings training camp. Luff was recalled to the NHL on November 3, 2018, and he made his NHL debut that night against the Columbus Blue Jackets. Luff played 9:43 in his debut to help the Kings win 4–1 over the Blue Jackets. After playing in three games, Luff was reassigned to the Ontario Reign on November 11 only to be recalled three days later on November 14. Luff recorded his first career NHL goal in a 2–0 win over the St. Louis Blues on November 19. On November 25, in a 5–2 win over the Edmonton Oilers, Luff recorded his fourth goal in the same number of games, becoming the fifth Kings rookie to do so since Jimmy Carson in 1987. His streak ended the following game against the Vancouver Canucks.

After appearing in 30 games for the Kings, and recording 10 points, Luff was reassigned to the Ontario Reign on February 8, 2019.

==== Nashville Predators ====
Luff played for five years within the Los Angeles Kings organization before leaving as a free agent following the 2020–21 season. He was signed to a one-year, two-way contract with the Nashville Predators on July 28, 2021.

==== Detroit Red Wings ====
On July 13, 2022, Luff signed a one-year, two-way contract with the Detroit Red Wings. During the 2022–23 season, he recorded two goals and two assists in 19 games with the Red Wings, and eight goals and 17 assists in 28 games for the Grand Rapids Griffins of the AHL. On July 1, 2023, Luff signed a one-year, two-way contract with the Red Wings.

Following two seasons within the Red Wings organization, Luff left as a free agent and was un-signed over the summer. On September 11, 2024, Luff accepted an invitation to attend the Florida Panthers training camp for the 2024–25 season on a professional tryout. On September 30, Luff was released from the PTO after failing to make the team. After being released, he joined the AHL Charlotte Checkers training camp on a tryout basis. Luff began the season with the Checkers, contributing with 2 goals and 4 points through 6 games before he was released from his PTO to sign a one-year contract with fellow AHL club, the Springfield Thunderbirds, the primary affiliate to the St. Louis Blues on November 7, 2024.

==== St. Louis Blues ====
After a successful stint in the AHL with affiliate, the Thunderbirds, Luff continued his tenure with the organization by signing a one-year, two-way contract with the St. Louis Blues on July 1, 2025.

==== New York Islanders ====
On February 24, 2026, it was announced that Matt Luff had been traded to the New York Islanders in exchange for Julien Gauthier.

== Career statistics ==
			Regular season					Playoffs
Season	Team	League	GP	G	A	Pts	PIM	GP	G	A	Pts	PIM
2013–14	Oakville Blades	OJHL	10	3	3	6	6	—	—	—	—	—
2014–15	Belleville Bulls	OHL	64	9	22	31	20	4	1	1	2	4
2015–16	Hamilton Bulldogs	OHL	61	27	30	57	43	—	—	—	—	—
2016–17	Hamilton Bulldogs	OHL	45	25	24	49	33	7	4	5	9	4
2016–17	Ontario Reign	AHL	2	0	1	1	0	—	—	—	—	—
2017–18	Ontario Reign	AHL	67	12	17	29	42	4	1	0	1	2
2018–19	Ontario Reign	AHL	36	11	20	31	32	—	—	—	—	—
2018–19	Los Angeles Kings	NHL	33	8	3	11	9	—	—	—	—	—
2019–20	Ontario Reign	AHL	30	9	15	24	18	—	—	—	—	—
2019–20	Los Angeles Kings	NHL	18	1	4	5	2	—	—	—	—	—
2020–21	Los Angeles Kings	NHL	13	1	0	1	5	—	—	—	—	—
2020–21	Ontario Reign	AHL	4	3	1	4	2	—	—	—	—	—
2021–22	Milwaukee Admirals	AHL	30	14	17	31	16	—	—	—	—	—
2021–22	Nashville Predators	NHL	23	3	3	6	4	—	—	—	—	—
2022–23	Grand Rapids Griffins	AHL	28	8	17	25	6	—	—	—	—	—
2022–23	Detroit Red Wings	NHL	19	2	2	4	0	—	—	—	—	—
2023–24	Grand Rapids Griffins	AHL	26	10	8	18	18	5	0	1	1	4
2024–25	Charlotte Checkers	AHL	6	2	2	4	0	—	—	—	—	—
2024–25	Springfield Thunderbirds	AHL	50	18	27	45	42	3	1	0	1	0
2025–26	Springfield Thunderbirds	AHL	42	14	25	39	29	—	—	—	—	—
2025–26	St. Louis Blues	NHL	5	1	0	1	0	—	—	—	—	—
2025–26	Bridgeport Islanders	AHL	20	4	9	13	2	2	1	1	2	2
NHL totals			111	16	12	28	20	—	—	—	—	—
