= Petrus Palmu =

Finnish ice hockey player

- Born: 16 July 1997 (age 29) Joensuu, Finland
- Height: 5 ft 7 in (170 cm)
- Weight: 179 lb (81 kg; 12 st 11 lb)
- Position: Right wing
- Shoots: Left
- SHL team Former teams: Linköping HC; HC TPS; JYP Jyväskylä; ERC Ingolstadt; Jukurit; Örebro HK
- NHL draft: 181st overall, 2017; Vancouver Canucks
- Playing career: 2017–present

Petrus Palmu (born 16 July 1997) is a Finnish professional ice hockey forward who is currently playing with Linköping HC in the Swedish Hockey League (SHL). He was drafted 181st overall by the Vancouver Canucks in the 2017 NHL entry draft.

== Playing career ==
Palmu played in his native Finland, as a youth with Jokipojat and Jokerit at the Junior A and B level before opting to continue his development in North America after he was selected 22nd overall in the 2014 CHL import draft by the Owen Sound Attack of the Ontario Hockey League (OHL).

Following three seasons of major junior hockey with Owen Sound and after his selection to the Vancouver Canucks in the 2017 NHL Entry Draft, Palmu opted to return to Finland to embark on his professional career, agreeing to a contract with TPS of the Liiga on 3 May 2017.

In the 2017–18 season, Palmu led all rookies within the Liiga by posting 17 goals and 36 points in 59 games. As a result, Palmu was awarded the Jarmo Wasama Memorial Trophy as Liiga's Rookie of the Year.

On 28 May 2018, Palmu signed a three-year entry-level contract with the Vancouver Canucks of the National Hockey League (NHL). After attending the Canucks 2018 training camp, Palmu was reassigned to begin the 2018–19 season with AHL affiliate, the Utica Comets. Petrus played just 12 of 28 games with Utica, featuring heavily as a healthy scratch, before he was loaned back to TPS to continue his development for the remainder of the season on 13 December 2018.

Palmu again attended the Vancouver Canucks training camp before the 2019–20 season, before he was returned to Finland for a second consecutive year on loan, joining JYP Jyväskylä on 3 October 2019. In a top-line scoring role, Palmu rebounded from his previous season in collecting 14 goals and 35 points through 47 regular-season games.

Entering the final season of his entry-level contract with the Canucks, having been pushed down in the depth chart and with the COVID-19 pandemic delaying the 2020–21 season, Palmu remained in Europe after he loaned by Vancouver to German club, ERC Ingolstadt of the DEL, on 23 November 2020.

== Career statistics ==
=== Regular season and playoffs ===
			Regular season					Playoffs
Season	Team	League	GP	G	A	Pts	PIM	GP	G	A	Pts	PIM
2013–14	Jokerit	Jr. A	10	1	2	3	6	—	—	—	—	—
2014–15	Owen Sound Attack	OHL	62	22	20	42	20	5	1	0	1	0
2015–16	Owen Sound Attack	OHL	52	23	26	49	30	6	3	3	6	8
2016–17	Owen Sound Attack	OHL	62	40	58	98	34	17	13	8	21	6
2017–18	TPS	Liiga	59	17	19	36	36	11	4	2	6	4
2018–19	Utica Comets	AHL	12	0	1	1	2	—	—	—	—	—
2018–19	TPS	Liiga	29	4	14	18	8	4	0	0	0	0
2019–20	JYP Jyväskylä	Liiga	47	13	22	35	24	—	—	—	—	—
2020–21	ERC Ingolstadt	DEL	37	9	13	22	6	1	0	0	0	0
2021–22	Jukurit	Liiga	59	26	33	59	24	7	2	3	5	4
2022–23	Örebro HK	SHL	15	1	3	4	22	—	—	—	—	—
2022–23	Linköping HC	SHL	26	0	5	5	6	—	—	—	—	—
Liiga totals			194	60	88	148	92	22	6	5	11	8

=== International ===
Year	Team	Event	Result	GP	G	A	Pts	PIM
2014	Finland	IH18	5th	4	4	4	8	4
2015	Finland	U18	2nd place, silver medalist(s)	7	1	2	3	4
2017	Finland	WJC	9th	6	0	0	0	2
Junior totals				17	5	6	11	10

== Awards and honours ==
Award	Year
OHL
Second All-Star Team	2017
Liiga
Jarmo Wasama Memorial Trophy	2018
