= Drake Rymsha =

American ice hockey player

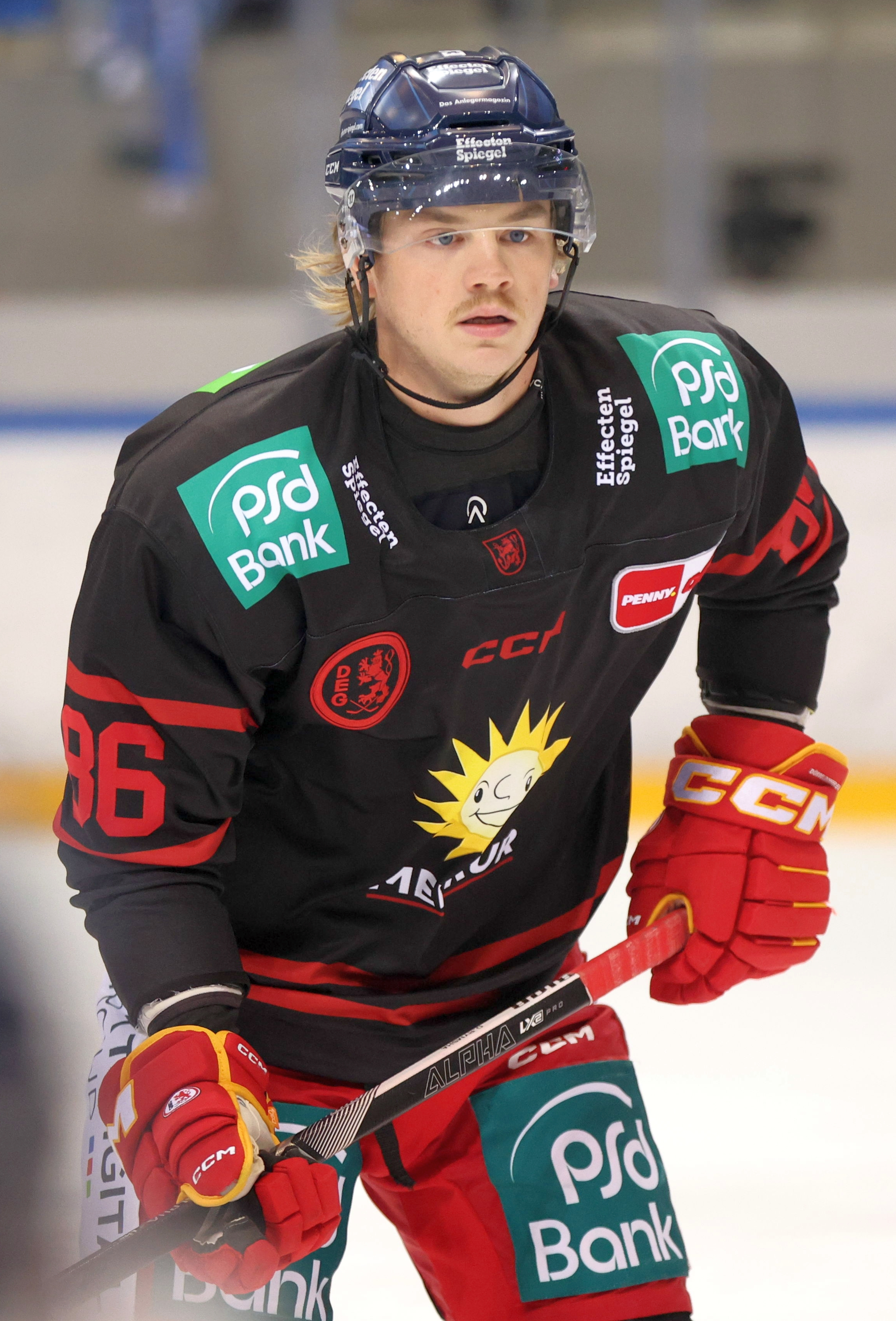
- Rymsha in 2024
- Born: August 6, 1998 (age 28) Huntington Woods, Michigan, US
- Height: 6 ft 0 in (183 cm)
- Weight: 187 lb (85 kg; 13 st 5 lb)
- Position: Centre
- Shoots: Right
- DEL team Former teams: Düsseldorfer EG; Los Angeles Kings; HKM Zvolen; EC Red Bull Salzburg
- NHL draft: 138th overall, 2017; Los Angeles Kings
- Playing career: 2018–present

Drake Rymsha (born August 6, 1998) is an American professional ice hockey forward who is currently playing with Düsseldorfer EG of the Deutsche Eishockey Liga (DEL). He has played for the Los Angeles Kings of the National Hockey League (NHL).

== Playing career ==
Rymsha played for the London Knights, Ottawa 67s and Sarnia Sting of the Ontario Hockey League, and was selected by the Los Angeles Kings in the fifth round, 138th overall, of the 2017 NHL entry draft. He was signed by the Kings to an entry-level contract on August 25, 2018.

Rymsha made his NHL debut in the final game of the Los Angeles Kings 2020–21 season, appearing on the fourth line in a 5-1 defeat to the Colorado Avalanche on May 13, 2021.

Following the completion of his entry-level deal with the Kings, Rymsha was not tendered a qualifying offer by the organization, releasing him as a free agent. On September 8, 2021, Rymsha signed a one-year contract with his former ECHL club, the Fort Wayne Komets. In the 2021–22 season, Rymsha was the offensive catalyst to start the year with the Komets, before he was signed to a professional try-out with the Hershey Bears on November 11, 2021. He later established a role on the team with the Bears and secured an AHL contract for the remainder of the year on January 23, 2022. He would make 49 regular season appearances with the Bears contributing with 1 goal and 9 points.

As a free agent from the Bears, Rymsha continued his career in the AHL, signing a one-year contract with the Bakersfield Condors, the primary affiliate to the Edmonton Oilers, on August 9, 2022. In the 2022–23 season, Rymsha spent the majority of the campaign with ECHL affiliate, the Fort Wayne Komets, in producing 58 points in as many games. He added 1 assist through 4 games with the Condors.

On June 20, 2023, Rymsha left North America as a free agent and signed a one-year contract with the Slovak club HKM Zvolen of the Slovak Extraliga. Rymsha began the 2023–24 season, on the top offensive line with Zvolen, producing 4 goals and 7 points through just 6 appearances before leaving the club to sign for the remainder of the season with Austrian champions, EC Red Bull Salzburg of the ICE Hockey League, on November 29, 2023. He collected 11 goals through 22 regular season contests before notching 5 goals in 19 playoff games to help Salzburg claim their third successive championship.

As a free agent, Rymsha continued his tenure abroad in joining the neighbouring DEL, signing a one-year deal with Düsseldorfer EG on June 6, 2024.

== Career statistics ==
			Regular season					Playoffs
Season	Team	League	GP	G	A	Pts	PIM	GP	G	A	Pts	PIM
2013–14	Toronto Jr. Canadiens	GTHL	33	15	26	41	26	13	3	5	8	18
2014–15	London Knights	OHL	62	5	7	12	51	10	0	0	0	0
2015–16	London Knights	OHL	4	0	0	0	4	—	—	—	—	—
2015–16	Ottawa 67's	OHL	28	3	6	9	24	5	0	0	0	6
2016–17	Ottawa 67's	OHL	37	15	14	29	41	—	—	—	—	—
2016–17	Sarnia Sting	OHL	28	20	13	33	39	4	1	2	3	17
2017–18	Sarnia Sting	OHL	68	31	42	73	70	12	3	6	9	10
2018–19	Ontario Reign	AHL	26	1	3	4	36	—	—	—	—	—
2018–19	Manchester Monarchs	ECHL	35	8	5	13	24	8	1	1	2	2
2019–20	Fort Wayne Komets	ECHL	24	9	8	17	23	—	—	—	—	—
2019–20	Ontario Reign	AHL	11	0	1	1	10	—	—	—	—	—
2020–21	Ontario Reign	AHL	1	0	0	0	5	—	—	—	—	—
2020–21	Los Angeles Kings	NHL	1	0	0	0	0	—	—	—	—	—
2021–22	Fort Wayne Komets	ECHL	11	10	8	18	14	—	—	—	—	—
2021–22	Hershey Bears	AHL	49	1	8	9	60	3	0	1	1	0
2022–23	Fort Wayne Komets	ECHL	58	24	34	58	62	5	0	5	5	4
2022–23	Bakersfield Condors	AHL	4	0	1	1	2	—	—	—	—	—
2023–24	HKM Zvolen	Slovak	6	4	3	7	0	—	—	—	—	—
2023–24	EC Red Bull Salzburg	ICEHL	22	8	3	11	28	19	5	2	7	16
2024–25	Düsseldorfer EG	DEL	50	15	12	27	47	—	—	—	—	—
NHL totals			1	0	0	0	0	—	—	—	—	—
