= Kole Sherwood =

American ice hockey player (born 1997)

- Born: January 22, 1997 (age 29) New Albany, Ohio, U.S.
- Height: 6 ft 1 in (185 cm)
- Weight: 202 lb (92 kg; 14 st 6 lb)
- Position: Right wing
- Shot: Right
- Played for: Columbus Blue Jackets; Nashville Predators
- NHL draft: Undrafted
- Playing career: 2018–2022

Kole Sherwood (born January 22, 1997) is an American retired professional ice hockey right winger. He most recently played with the Milwaukee Admirals in the American Hockey League (AHL) as a prospect to the Nashville Predators of the National Hockey League (NHL) in 2022.

When Sherwood made his NHL debut during the 2018–19 season, he became the first player from central Ohio to play for the Columbus Blue Jackets. Prior to turning professional, Sherwood played in the Ontario Hockey League with the London Knights, Flint Firebirds, and Kitchener Rangers.

== Playing career ==
=== Junior ===
Sherwood was introduced to hockey with his brother Kiefer by their father Roger. After playing in 31 games for the Ohio Blue Jackets U18 team, Sherwood played three games with the Youngstown Phantoms in the United States Hockey League (USHL) during the 2014–15 season.

On February 9, 2015, Sherwood committed to play NCAA hockey for Boston University. While Sherwood and his brother went undrafted to the NHL, they were both invited to the Columbus Blue Jackets 2015 development camp. He eventually signed an entry-level contract with the Blue Jackets on July 17, 2015, forgoing his NCAA eligibility. Instead of joining the Boston Terriers, Sherwood committed to the London Knights of the Ontario Hockey League (OHL) for the 2015–16 season.

On September 29, 2016, after playing his rookie season with the Knights, Sherwood was traded to the Flint Firebirds in exchange for two second round picks and one conditional pick. After having a career-high season with Flint in which he recorded 85 points in 60 games, Sherwood was traded to the Kitchener Rangers in exchange for draft picks ranging from 2019 to 2021. While with the Firebirds, Sherwood made his professional debut with the Cleveland Monsters, the Blue Jackets American Hockey League (AHL) affiliate, in April. Sherwood was returned to the OHL for the 2017–18 season where he completed his major junior career with the Rangers.

=== Professional ===
After attending the Blue Jackets training camp prior to the 2018–19 season, he was assigned to their AHL affiliate, the Cleveland Monsters, to begin the season. On November 21, 2018, after playing in eight AHL games, Sherwood was assigned to the Monsters ECHL affiliate, the Jacksonville Icemen. The demotion was short-lived as he was recalled back to the AHL on November 26, after playing in three games.

He was recalled to the NHL on January 13, 2019, after playing in 22 games for the Monsters. Although he was sent down without making his NHL debut, he was recalled again in February. Sherwood eventually made his NHL debut on February 16, 2019, against the Chicago Blackhawks, becoming the first player from central Ohio to play for the Blue Jackets. In his debut, he played 6:58 minutes alongside Riley Nash, Lukáš Sedlák, and Anthony Duclair to help the Blue Jackets win 5–2. He was reassigned to the Monsters on February 19 after Brandon Dubinsky was activated from injured reserve.

Sherwood attended the Blue Jackets training camp but failed to make their opening night roster. After spending the beginning of the season with the Monsters, Sherwood was called up on November 3, 2019. That night, Sherwood was roughed by Calgary Flames forward Milan Lucic who was subsequently suspended for two games.

On October 6, 2020, Sherwood as a restricted free agent was signed to a one-year, two-way contract with the Columbus Blue Jackets. He was subsequently loaned to join the KHL's Kunlun Red Star but rejoined the Blue Jackets prior to the 2020–21 season. Sherwood split the season between the Blue Jackets and the Monsters, appearing in 6 regular season games and registering 1 assist.

As an impending restricted free agent, Sherwood was released as a free agent after he was not tendered a qualifying offer by the Blue Jackets. On July 29, 2021, Sherwood agreed to a one-year, two-way contract with the Ottawa Senators. After competing in his first training camp with the Senators, Sherwood was assigned to the AHL to begin the 2021–22 season with the Belleville Senators. Compiling just 1 goal and 4 points in 13 games with Belleville, on November 30, 2021, Sherwood was traded by the Senators to the Nashville Predators in exchange for future considerations. He was immediately re-assigned by the Predators to join the Milwaukee Admirals.

== Personal life ==
Sherwood was born to parents Roger and Yuko in New Albany, Ohio. His older brother Kiefer is a professional hockey player for the San Jose Sharks, and previously with Vancouver Canucks.

== Career statistics ==
			Regular season					Playoffs
Season	Team	League	GP	G	A	Pts	PIM	GP	G	A	Pts	PIM
2014–15	Ohio Blue Jackets	T1EHL	31	22	26	48	29	4	1	3	4	16
2014–15	Youngstown Phantoms	USHL	3	1	1	2	0	18	2	4	6	14
2015–16	London Knights	OHL	63	12	22	34	53	7	0	0	0	0
2016–17	Flint Firebirds	OHL	60	33	52	85	60	5	4	1	5	10
2016–17	Cleveland Monsters	AHL	2	0	0	0	2	—	—	—	—	—
2017–18	Kitchener Rangers	OHL	57	30	30	60	56	19	14	12	26	30
2018–19	Cleveland Monsters	AHL	56	16	9	25	71	6	0	1	1	13
2018–19	Jacksonville Icemen	ECHL	3	1	0	1	4	—	—	—	—	—
2018–19	Columbus Blue Jackets	NHL	2	0	0	0	0	—	—	—	—	—
2019–20	Cleveland Monsters	AHL	43	10	3	13	54	—	—	—	—	—
2019–20	Columbus Blue Jackets	NHL	3	0	0	0	2	—	—	—	—	—
2020–21	Cleveland Monsters	AHL	9	3	1	4	17	—	—	—	—	—
2020–21	Columbus Blue Jackets	NHL	6	0	1	1	7	—	—	—	—	—
2021–22	Belleville Senators	AHL	13	1	3	4	8	—	—	—	—	—
2021–22	Milwaukee Admirals	AHL	31	4	3	7	27	3	0	0	0	4
2021–22	Nashville Predators	NHL	1	0	0	0	0	—	—	—	—	—
NHL totals			12	0	1	1	9	—	—	—	—	—

== See also ==
- List of family relations in the NHL
