= Jonah Gadjovich =

Canadian ice hockey player (born 1998)

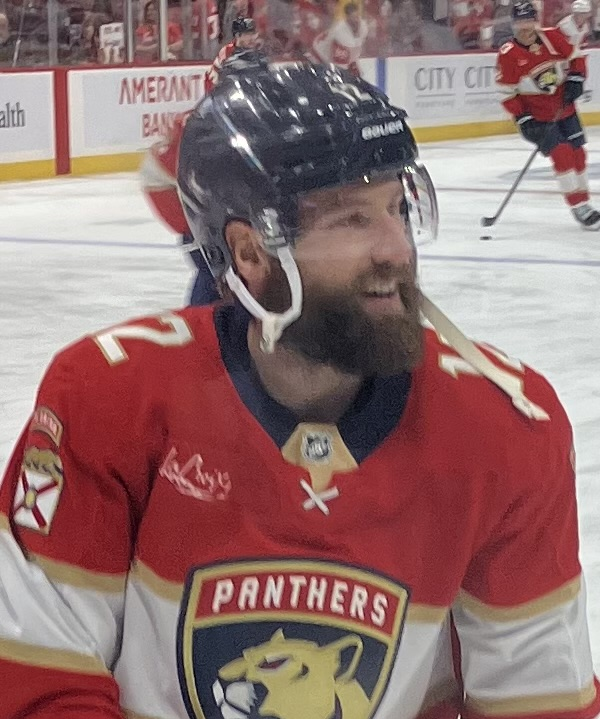
- Gadjovich with the Florida Panthers in 2025
- Born: October 12, 1998 (age 27) Whitby, Ontario, Canada
- Height: 6 ft 2 in (188 cm)
- Weight: 211 lb (96 kg; 15 st 1 lb)
- Position: Left wing
- Shoots: Left
- NHL team Former teams: Florida Panthers; Vancouver Canucks; San Jose Sharks
- NHL draft: 55th overall, 2017; Vancouver Canucks
- Playing career: 2019–present

Jonah Gadjovich (born October 12, 1998) is a Canadian professional ice hockey player who is a left winger for the Florida Panthers of the National Hockey League (NHL). He was selected 55th overall in the 2017 NHL entry draft by the Vancouver Canucks. He previously played for the Canucks and the San Jose Sharks. He won the Stanley Cup with the Panthers in 2024 and 2025.

Growing up in Whitby, Ontario, Gadjovich began playing minor ice hockey with the Whitby Wildcats of the Eastern AAA Hockey League. He was soon drafted by the Owen Sound Attack in the second round of the 2014 Ontario Hockey League (OHL) Priority Selection. Through his tenure with the Attack, Gadjovich accumulated 89 goals and 66 assists through 228 games played.

== Early life ==
Gadjovich was born on October 12, 1998, in Whitby, Ontario. He was born into an athletic family of Macedonian descent as his uncles Blair and Tony MacDonald were active within the National Hockey League (NHL). Blair played 219 career NHL games with the Edmonton Oilers and Vancouver Canucks while Tony is the director of amateur scouting for the Carolina Hurricanes.

== Playing career ==
=== Amateur ===
Growing up in Whitby, Ontario, Gadjovich began playing minor ice hockey with the Whitby Wildcats of the Eastern AAA Hockey League. While with the team, he competed for Team OMHA White at the Gold Cup in Kitchener where he tallied a goal and three assists in five games. During the 2013–14 season, he had tallied 15 goals and 15 assists before signing a standard player agreement with the Owen Sound Attack of the Ontario Hockey League (OHL). He had originally been drafted by the Attack in the second round, 39th overall, in the 2014 Ontario Hockey League Priority Selection. Following the signing, Gadjovich, and teammate Victor Mete were selected by Hockey Canada to participate in their 2014 National Under-17 Development Camp. He returned to the Attack for his rookie season and notched his first career OHL goal on October 5, 2014, in a 7–2 win over the Ottawa 67's. Gadjovich finished his rookie season with four goals and five assists for nine points through 60 games.

Gadjovich improved offensively in his first year of draft eligibility and finished the 2016–17 season with 46 goals through 60 games. His first career OHL hat-trick came on January 7, 2017, in a 5–1 win over the Windsor Spitfires to lead the Attack to their ninth consecutive win. He scored his second hat-trick of the season two games later to help set an Attack franchise record with 11th consecutive wins. On February 11, Gadjovich tallied his third OHL hat-trick in a 10–5 win over the Ottawa 67's to lead the Attack to their eighth win in 10 games. During a game against the London Knights, Gadjovich recorded his fourth hat-trick of the season to help the team qualify for the 2017 Ontario Hockey League Playoffs. During the game, he was cross-checked by Max Jones who was subsequently suspended for 10 games. At the conclusion of the season, Gadjovich was selected for the OHL Second All-Star Team. As the 2017 NHL entry draft approached, Gadjovich was given a final ranking of 39th amongst North American skaters by the NHL Central Scouting Bureau. He had originally been ranked 60th overall in November but his breakout season earned him a jump in the standings.

Gadjovich was eventually drafted in the second round, 55th overall, by the Vancouver Canucks after they acquired the pick from the Columbus Blue Jackets as compensation for the Blue Jackets hiring John Tortorella. He returned to the Attack for the 2017–18 season where he played eight games before signing an entry-level contract with the Canucks.

=== Professional ===
==== Vancouver Canucks ====
Gadjovich concluded his major junior ice hockey career at end of the 2017–18 season and joined the Canucks American Hockey League (AHL) affiliate, the Utica Comets, for the 2018–19 season. However, he did not compete in the Canucks' Summer Showcase game at Rogers Arena as he was recovering from a wrist injury suffered during the OHL playoffs. He made his professional debut on October 5, 2018, in the Comets' season opener against the Toronto Marlies. He later scored his first professional goal on November 9 in a 4–3 shootout win over the Hartford Wolf Pack to lead the team to a 5–3–1 record. As Gadjovich continued to display his offensive prowess, Comets coach Trent Cull gave him time on the Comets' power play as a replacement for Zack MacEwen. He finished his first professional season with four goals and 10 points through 40 games.

Following his rookie season, Gadjovich was invited to participate in the Canucks development camp prior to the 2019–20 season. However, he was subsequently re-assigned to the Comets prior to the start of the season. By December, Gadjovich had surpassed his previous season's goal total with five goals through 12 games. Due to various injuries and illness throughout the shortened season, Gadjovich was held to only 38 games but he still set career-highs with 13 goals and four assists for 17 points along with 32 penalty minutes.

Gadjovich continued to produce and score goals in his third professional season. In May, he led the Comets with 15 goals and earned his first career NHL call-up after recording a Gordie Howe hat trick. Gadjovich subsequently made his NHL debut on May 17, 2021, against the Calgary Flames, where he played 4:55 in the 6–5 overtime loss. As a result of his overall play during the season, Gadjovich was voted the Comets' Most Valuable Player, which is voted on by media members, and the Tom McVie Award for the coach’s most valuable player.

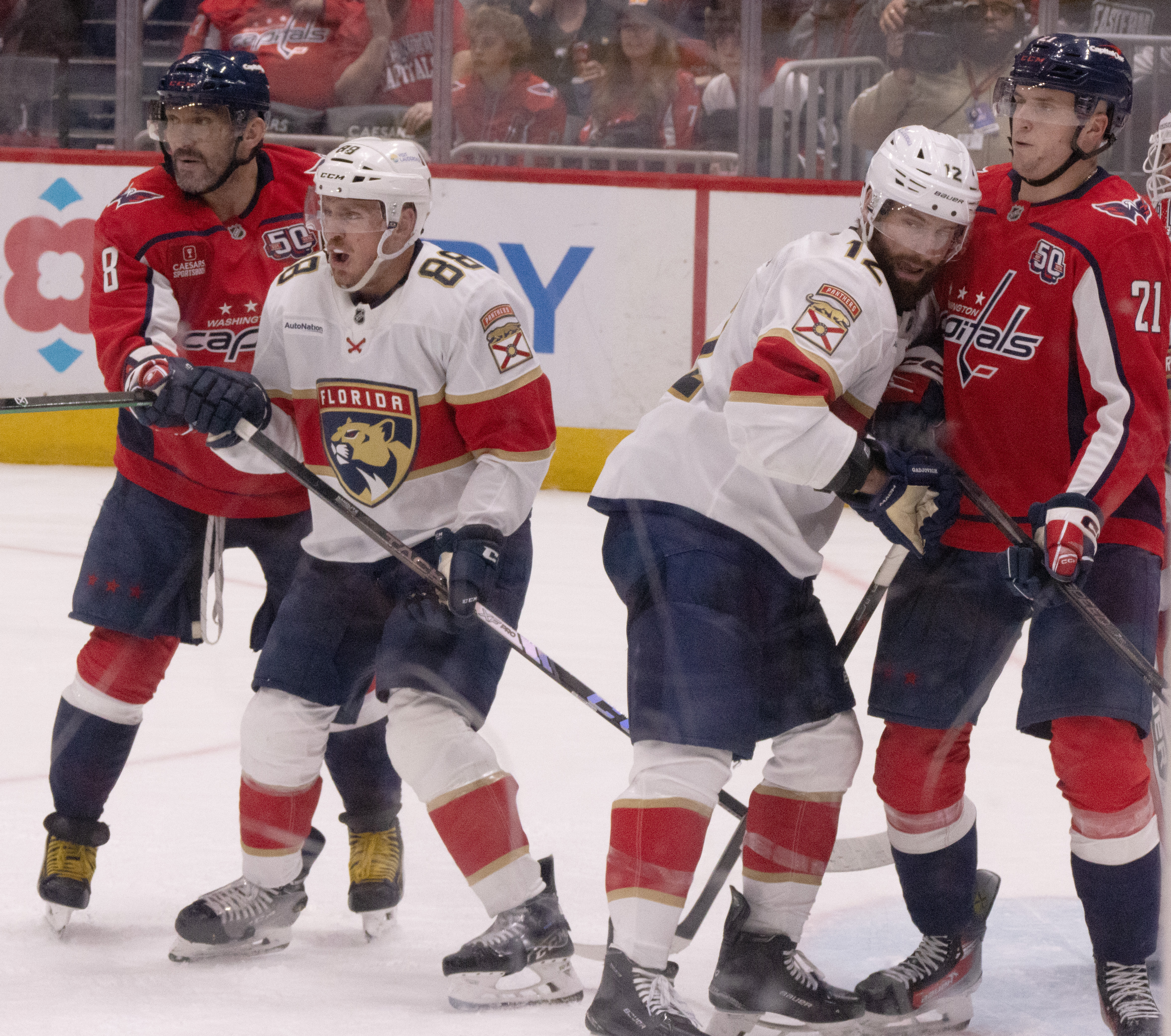
Gadjovich (second from right) battles for position with Aliaksei Protas during a game against the Washington Capitals in 2025.

==== San Jose Sharks ====
On October 7, 2021, Gadjovich was claimed off waivers by the San Jose Sharks. Upon claiming him, Sharks general manager Doug Wilson praised him as a "skater who can use his size to his advantage." Gadjovich was subsequently named to their NHL roster and made his debut against the Boston Bruins on October 24, 2021. During that game, he tallied his first NHL point, an assist, on Jasper Weatherby's goal in an eventual 4–3 loss to the Bruins. His first goal came on February 27, 2022, in a 3–1 victory over the Seattle Kraken. He re-signed to a one-year contract on August 29, 2022.

==== Florida Panthers ====
Leaving the Sharks organization after two seasons, Gadjovich initially signed a one-year AHL deal with the Charlotte Checkers on July 2, 2023. Approaching the 2023–24 season, Gadjovich accepted an invitation to attend the affiliated Florida Panthers training camp. Remaining with the team through pre-season and before making an appearance with the Checkers, Gadjovich was signed to a one-year, $810,000 contract with the Panthers on October 17, 2023. Gadjovich made his season debut with the Checkers before he was recalled and made his Florida Panthers debut in a 2–1 victory over the Anaheim Ducks on November 17, 2023.

On March 7, 2024, Gadjovich was signed to a two-year contract extension by the Panthers. In his first season with the Panthers, Gadjovich won the Stanley Cup in 2024. He played 39 regular season games but did not dress in the playoffs. Florida requested Gadjovich's name be included on the Stanley Cup for spending the whole season with the team.

On October 12, 2025, Gadjovich was signed to another two-year extension by the Panthers.

== International play ==
Medal record

Representing Canada

ice hockey

IIHF World U20 Championship
Gold medal – first place	2018 United States	

Gadjovich was selected to the Team Canada's under-20 team for the 2018 World Junior Championships in Buffalo, New York, winning gold. He was named a player of the game for scoring two goals against Slovakia.

== Career statistics ==
=== Regular season and playoffs ===
			Regular season					Playoffs
Season	Team	League	GP	G	A	Pts	PIM	GP	G	A	Pts	PIM
2013–14	Whitby Wildcats	ETAHL	23	15	15	30	20	4	0	2	2	0
2014–15	Owen Sound Attack	OHL	60	4	5	9	59	3	0	0	0	0
2015–16	Owen Sound Attack	OHL	66	14	10	24	42	6	1	1	2	6
2016–17	Owen Sound Attack	OHL	60	46	28	74	32	17	4	3	7	8
2017–18	Owen Sound Attack	OHL	42	25	23	48	42	9	2	2	4	2
2018–19	Utica Comets	AHL	43	4	6	10	32	—	—	—	—	—
2019–20	Utica Comets	AHL	38	13	4	17	32	—	—	—	—	—
2020–21	Utica Comets	AHL	19	15	3	18	17	—	—	—	—	—
2020–21	Vancouver Canucks	NHL	1	0	0	0	17	—	—	—	—	—
2021–22	San Jose Sharks	NHL	43	1	2	3	74	—	—	—	—	—
2022–23	San Jose Sharks	NHL	35	3	4	7	57	—	—	—	—	—
2023–24	Florida Panthers	NHL	39	2	2	4	104	—	—	—	—	—
2023–24	Charlotte Checkers	AHL	3	1	0	1	0	—	—	—	—	—
2024–25	Florida Panthers	NHL	42	4	0	4	60	16	2	1	3	33
2025–26	Florida Panthers	NHL	10	0	3	3	7	—	—	—	—	—
NHL totals			170	10	11	21	319	16	2	1	3	33

=== International ===
Year	Team	Event	Result	GP	G	A	Pts	PIM
2018	Canada	WJC	1st place, gold medalist(s)	7	2	1	3	6
Junior totals				7	2	1	3	6

== Awards and honours ==
Award	Year	Ref
OHL
Second All-Star Team	2017	
NHL
Stanley Cup champion	2024, 2025	
