= Semyon Der-Arguchintsev =

Russian ice hockey player (born 2000)

- Born: September 15, 2000 (age 26) Moscow, Russia
- Height: 5 ft 11 in (180 cm)
- Weight: 170 lb (77 kg; 12 st 2 lb)
- Position: Centre
- Shoots: Right
- KHL team Former teams: Free agent Torpedo Nizhny Novgorod; Toronto Maple Leafs; Traktor Chelyabinsk; Dynamo Moscow
- NHL draft: 76th overall, 2018; Toronto Maple Leafs
- Playing career: 2019–present

Semyon Der-Arguchintsev (Russian: Семён Дер-Аргучинцев; born September 15, 2000) is a Russian professional ice hockey forward who is currently under contract with Admiral Vladivostok of the Kontinental Hockey League (KHL). He was drafted by the Toronto Maple Leafs in the 2018 NHL entry draft, with his National Hockey League (NHL) rights still held by the club.

== Playing career ==
In 2016, while playing for the CIHA White Midget AAA, Der-Arguchintsev was selected in the 2016 Ontario Hockey League (OHL) Priority Selection Draft, second round, 27th overall, by the Peterborough Petes. After scoring 80 points in 131 OHL games, in the 2018 NHL entry draft, Der-Arguchintsev was selected in the third round, 76th overall, by the Toronto Maple Leafs. Impressing at his first Maple Leafs rookie training camp, Der-Arguchintsev was signed by the Maple Leafs to a three-year, entry-level contract on September 22, 2018.

In the following year, Der-Arguchintsev nabbed 46 points in 62 games in the OHL, and played three regular season games for the Newfoundland Growlers, the Maple Leafs ECHL affiliate, registering two points. He featured in nine playoff games, adding a further two points.

Returning to the OHL the following 2019–20 season, and playing with fellow Leafs prospect Nicholas Robertson, Der-Arguchintsev scored 12 goals and acquired 63 assists for 75 points in 55 games before the season was canceled due to the COVID-19 pandemic. His 63 assists was third in the OHL, behind Marco Rossi of the Ottawa 67's and Cole Perfetti of the Saginaw Spirit.

Approaching his first full professional season, and with North American 2020–21 season set to be delayed due to the ongoing pandemic, on October 26, 2020, Der-Arguchintsev was loaned by the Maple Leafs to join Russian club, Torpedo Nizhny Novgorod of the Kontinental Hockey League (KHL). He returned to North America in the following season. Der-Arguchintsev spent the entire 2021–22 season with the Leafs American Hockey League (AHL) affiliate, the Toronto Marlies. For the 2022–23 season, he was assigned to the Marlies. However, on December 4, 2022, Der-Arguchintsev was recalled by the Maple Leafs. On December 6, Der-Arguchintsev made his NHL debut in a 4–0 win over the Dallas Stars. He was returned to the Marlies on December 8.

As a pending restricted free agent following his third season within the Maple Leafs organization, Der-Arguchintsev opted to return to Russia and sign a two-year contract with Traktor Chelyabinsk of the KHL on July 4, 2023.

== Career statistics ==
			Regular season					Playoffs
Season	Team	League	GP	G	A	Pts	PIM	GP	G	A	Pts	PIM
2016–17	Peterborough Petes	OHL	63	8	21	29	2	12	3	5	8	2
2017–18	Peterborough Petes	OHL	68	12	39	51	18	—	—	—	—	—
2018–19	Peterborough Petes	OHL	62	6	40	46	20	5	0	3	3	2
2018–19	Newfoundland Growlers	ECHL	3	1	1	2	0	9	1	1	2	2
2019–20	Peterborough Petes	OHL	55	12	63	75	23	—	—	—	—	—
2020–21	Torpedo Nizhny Novgorod	KHL	17	2	4	6	2	4	0	0	0	0
2020–21	Toronto Marlies	AHL	6	0	4	4	0	—	—	—	—	—
2021–22	Toronto Marlies	AHL	51	13	19	32	18	—	—	—	—	—
2022–23	Toronto Marlies	AHL	50	12	28	40	16	5	2	1	3	0
2022–23	Toronto Maple Leafs	NHL	1	0	0	0	0	—	—	—	—	—
2023–24	Traktor Chelyabinsk	KHL	53	17	17	34	18	13	4	6	10	0
2024–25	Traktor Chelyabinsk	KHL	59	13	17	30	26	19	4	8	12	2
2025–26	Traktor Chelyabinsk	KHL	33	2	21	23	4	—	—	—	—	—
2025–26	Dynamo Moscow	KHL	26	4	10	14	6	4	0	2	2	2
KHL totals			188	38	69	107	56	40	8	16	24	4
NHL totals			1	0	0	0	0	—	—	—	—	—

== Awards and honours ==
Award	Year
ECHL
Kelly Cup champion	2019
