= 2020–21 SPHL season =

- League: Southern Professional Hockey League
- Sport: Ice hockey
- Duration: December 26, 2020 – May 2, 2021
- Number of games: 42
- Number of teams: 5

Regular season
- William B. Coffey Trophy: Macon Mayhem
- Season MVP: Mason Baptista (Macon)
- Top scorer: Logan Nelson (Birmingham)

Playoffs
- Finals champions: Pensacola Ice Flyers
- Finals runners-up: Macon Mayhem

SPHL seasons
- ← 2019–20 2021–22 →

The 2020–21 SPHL season is the 17th season of the Southern Professional Hockey League (SPHL). Due to the ongoing restrictions amid the COVID-19 pandemic, the start of the season was delayed to December 26, 2020, and only half of the member teams participated in the shortened season.

== League business ==
Due to the COVID-19 pandemic, the 2019–20 season was curtailed and no champion was named. For the 2020–21 season, the league announced the Evansville Thunderbolts, Fayetteville Marksmen, Peoria Rivermen, Quad City Storm, and Roanoke Rail Yard Dawgs had withdrawn from participating in the season due to pandemic-related capacity restrictions barring fans from attending games.

== Teams ==
2020-201Southern Professional Hockey League
Team	City	Arena
Birmingham Bulls	Pelham, Alabama	Pelham Civic Center
Huntsville Havoc	Huntsville, Alabama	Von Braun Center
Knoxville Ice Bears	Knoxville, Tennessee	Knoxville Civic Coliseum
Macon Mayhem	Macon, Georgia	Macon Coliseum
Pensacola Ice Flyers	Pensacola, Florida	Pensacola Bay Center

== Map of teams ==
SPHL teams

== Regular season ==
=== Standings ===
Final standings:

Team	GP	W	L	OTL	SOL	GF	GA	Pts
Macon Mayhem‡	42	32	6	2	2	134	84	68
Knoxville Ice Bears	42	24	14	3	1	128	103	52
Pensacola Ice Flyers	42	18	18	2	4	117	120	42
Huntsville Havoc	42	19	22	1	0	123	137	39
Birmingham Bulls	42	12	23	7	0	103	161	31

^{‡} William B. Coffey Trophy winners
Qualified for playoffs

=== Attendance ===
Team	Total	Games	Average
Pensacola	45,615	21	2,172
Huntsville	44,136	21	2,102
Birmingham	35,301	21	1,681
Knoxville	33,331	21	1,587
Macon	25,066	21	1,194
League	183,449	105	1,747

== President's Cup playoffs ==
For 2021, the top four teams at the end of the regular season qualified for the playoffs.

=== Playoff bracket ===
Semifinals; Best-of-3
1	Macon	2
4	Huntsville	0
2	Knoxville	0
3	Pensacola	2

Championship; Best-of-3
1	Macon	0
3	Pensacola	2

== Awards ==
Award	Recipient(s)
President's Cup	Pensacola Ice Flyers
William B. Coffey Trophy (Best regular-season record)	Macon Mayhem
Defenseman of the Year	Kenton Helgesen (Knoxville)
Rookie of the Year	Jake Wahlin (Pensacola)
Goaltender of the Year	Jake Theut (Macon)
Coach of the Year	Kevin Kerr (Macon)
Most Valuable Player	Mason Baptista (Macon)
Leading Scorer Award	Logan Nelson (Birmingham)

=== All-SPHL selections ===
Position	First Team	Second Team	All-Rookie
G	Jake Theut (Macon)	Austyn Roudebush (Knoxville)	Ryan Ruck (Macon)
D	Kenton Helgesen (Knoxville); Nolan Kaiser (Huntsville) tie Nick Minerva (Macon) tie	Casey Johnson (Macon); Nick Neville (Pensacola)	Casey Johnson (Macon); Andrew McLean (Knoxville)
F	Mason Baptista (Macon); Jacob Benson (Knoxville); Jake Wahlin (Pensacola)	Rob Darrar (Huntsville); Eddie Matsushima (Pensacola); Logan Nelson (Birmingham)	Nick Master (Knoxville); Ryan Smith (Macon); Jake Wahlin (Pensacola)
