= Kirill Kozhevnikov (ice hockey) =

Russian ice hockey player (born 1999)

- Born: 26 January 1999 (age 27) Nizhnevartovsk, Russia
- Height: 186 cm (6 ft 1 in)
- Weight: 92 kg (203 lb; 14 st 7 lb)
- Position: Forward
- Shoots: Left
- KHL team Former teams: Avangard Omsk; HC Yugra; HC Sochi; Spartak Moscow
- NHL draft: Undrafted
- Playing career: 2016–present

Kirill Kozhevnikov (born 26 January 1999) is a Russian professional ice hockey forward who is currently under contract with Avangard Omsk of the Kontinental Hockey League (KHL).
