= Mattias Norlinder =

Swedish ice hockey player (born 2000)

- Born: 12 April 2000 (age 26) Kramfors, Sweden
- Height: 6 ft 0 in (183 cm)
- Weight: 191 lb (87 kg; 13 st 9 lb)
- Position: Defence
- Shoots: Left
- SHL team Former teams: Brynäs IF; Montreal Canadiens; MoDo Hockey; Frölunda HC
- National team: Sweden
- NHL draft: 64th overall, 2019; Montreal Canadiens
- Playing career: 2019–present

Mattias Norlinder (born 12 April 2000) is a Swedish professional ice hockey player who is a defenceman for Brynäs IF of the Swedish Hockey League (SHL). He was selected in the third round, 64th overall, by the Montreal Canadiens in the 2019 NHL entry draft.

== Playing career ==
=== Sweden ===
As a youth, Norlinder played junior hockey for MoDo Hockey in his country's J20 SuperElit, winning the Anton Cup and Playoffs MVP award in 2019.

During the 2018–19 season, he made his professional debut for the team in the HockeyAllsvenskan ranks, appearing in 14 games with two goals and four assists over that span. In March 2019, he signed a one-year professional contract with the team. The following year, despite missing time with a concussion, Norlinder was named as the best junior (Guldgallret) in the HockeyAllsvenskan.

In 2020–21, he was loaned to Frölunda HC of the top-tier Swedish Hockey League (SHL), registering five goals and five assists across 37 games played.

=== North America ===
Selected by the Montreal Canadiens of the National Hockey League (NHL) in the third round (64th overall) of the 2019 NHL entry draft, Norlinder was signed to a three-year, entry-level contract by the team on 3 June 2021. That November, he made his North American professional debut with the Canadiens' American Hockey League (AHL) affiliate, the Laval Rocket, followed by his NHL debut with Montreal in a 6–0 loss against the Pittsburgh Penguins on 18 November 2021. On 27 November 2021, Norlinder recorded his first NHL point with an assist in a 6–3 win against the Penguins. Having played six NHL games before returning to the Rocket, he was later reassigned on loan to continue his development overseas with Frölunda HC for the remainder of their SHL season on 16 December 2021.

Returning to North America for the 2022–23 campaign, Norlinder appeared in 67 games with the Rocket scoring two goals and 19 total points. He was again assigned to Laval to begin the 2023–24 season. However, after fellow defenceman Jordan Harris suffered a significant injury, Norlinder was recalled by Montreal on 21 November 2023. Collectively, he saw no playing time with the Canadiens and, after veteran David Savard rejoined the lineup, he was returned to Laval on 10 December.

=== Return to Sweden ===
Prior to the beginning of the NHL free agency period, Norlinder was not tendered a qualifying offer by the Canadiens before the deadline of 30 June 2024, therefore making him an unrestricted free agent. Having trained with former club MoDo Hockey during the 2024–25 preseason, the team began a crowdfunding campaign to raise 1,000,000 Swedish kronor ($97,500) in additional funds to sign him. On 4 September 2024, Norlinder officially agreed to a two-year contract with the foregoing, turning down an offer from the Canadiens to do so.

Following MoDo's relegation to the HockeyAllsvenskan after just one season, Norlinder ended his tenure to continue in the SHL with Brynäs IF on a two-year deal in May 2025.

== International play ==
Norlinder represented the Swedish national junior team at the 2020 World Junior Ice Hockey Championships, capturing a bronze medal. Thereafter, he made his senior national team debut at the 2020 Karjala Cup as part of the Euro Hockey Tour. Norlinder likewise participated in the 2024 iteration of the tournament.

== Personal life ==
Norlinder's younger brother, Linus, is also an ice hockey player currently with Kramfors-Alliansen of Sweden's Hockeytvåan.

== Career statistics ==
=== Regular season and playoffs ===
			Regular season					Playoffs
Season	Team	League	GP	G	A	Pts	PIM	GP	G	A	Pts	PIM
2017–18	Modo Hockey	J20	36	8	5	13	10	—	—	—	—	—
2018–19	Modo Hockey	J20	30	5	16	21	43	5	2	4	6	6
2018–19	Modo Hockey	Allsv	14	2	4	6	4	5	1	2	3	2
2019–20	Modo Hockey	Allsv	34	7	11	18	2	2	1	0	1	0
2020–21	Frölunda HC	SHL	37	5	5	10	12	7	3	2	5	6
2021–22	Montreal Canadiens	NHL	6	0	1	1	2	—	—	—	—	—
2021–22	Laval Rocket	AHL	6	1	1	2	2	5	0	1	1	2
2021–22	Frölunda HC	SHL	21	0	2	2	2	9	0	6	6	8
2022–23	Laval Rocket	AHL	67	2	17	19	20	2	0	0	0	0
2023–24	Laval Rocket	AHL	50	2	7	9	26	—	—	—	—	—
2024–25	Modo Hockey	SHL	50	4	15	19	37	—	—	—	—	—
SHL totals			108	9	22	31	51	16	3	8	11	14
NHL totals			6	0	1	1	2	—	—	—	—	—

=== International ===
Year	Team	Event	Result	GP	G	A	Pts	PIM
2020	Sweden	WJC	3rd place, bronze medalist(s)	7	0	0	0	0
2020	Sweden	Karjala	4th	2	0	0	0	0
2024	Sweden	Karjala	4th	5	0	0	0	0
Junior totals				7	0	0	0	0
Senior totals				7	0	0	0	0

== Awards and honours ==
Award	Year	Ref
J20 SuperElit
Anton Cup	2019	
Playoffs MVP	2019	
HockeyAllsvenskan
Best junior (Guldgallret)	2020	
