= 2020 Karjala Tournament =

2020 Karjala Tournament (Euro Hockey Games)
Tournament details
- Host country: Finland
- City: Helsinki
- Venue: 1 (in 1 host city)
- Dates: 5–8 November 2020
- Teams: 4

Final positions
- Champions: Russia (9th title)
- Runners-up: Czech Republic
- Third place: Finland
- Fourth place: Sweden

Tournament statistics
- Games played: 6
- Goals scored: 25 (4.17 per game)
- Attendance: 7,850 (1,308 per game)
- Scoring leader: (Russia) Yegor Afanasyev (4 points)

Official website
- leijonat.com

The 2020 Karjala Tournament was played between 5–8 November 2020. The Czech Republic, Finland, Sweden and Russia played a round-robin for a total of three games per team and six games in total. All games were played in Helsinki Halli, Helsinki. Russia won the tournament. The tournament was part of the 2020–21 Euro Hockey Tour.

== Standings ==
Pos	Team	Pld	W	OTW	OTL	L	GF	GA	GD	Pts
1	Russia	3	2	1	0	0	11	3	+8	8
2	Czech Republic	3	2	0	0	1	5	4	+1	6
3	Finland	3	1	0	0	2	5	10	−5	3
4	Sweden	3	0	0	1	2	4	8	−4	1

Source: eurohockey

== Games ==
All times are local. Helsinki – (Eastern European Time – UTC+2)

5 November 2020; 14:30	Czech Republic	3-1 (2-0, 1-0, 0-1)	Sweden	Helsinki Halli, Helsinki; Attendance: 0

Game reference

Patrik Bartošák
Goalies
Niklas Rubin
Referees:
(Finland) Riku Brander
(Finland) Aaro Brännare

16:34 – Filip Hronek (Andrej Nestrasil, Hynek Zohorna) (PP)	1-0
18:18 – Hynek Zohorna (Andrej Nestrasil, Filip Hronek) (PP)	2-0
26:56 – Jakub Galvas (Šimon Stránský, Jan Mysak)	3-0
	3-1	41:44 – Max Friberg (Anton Wedin, Andreas Wingerli)

4 min
Penalties
6 min
24
Shots
20

5 November 2020; 18:30	Russia	6-2 (3-0, 2-1, 1-1)	Finland	Helsinki Halli, Helsinki; Attendance: 2,224

Game reference

Yaroslav Askarov
Goalies
Oskari Setänen
Referees:
(Finland) Mikko Kaukokari
(Finland) Sakari Suominen

01:42 – Rodion Amirov	1-0
11:21 – Marat Khusnutdinov (Daniil Chayka)	2-0
16:53 – Ilya Safonov (Vasily Podkolzin, Yegor Afanasyev)	3-0
	3-1	22:33 – Elmeri Eronen (Jukka Peltola)
34:57 – Daniil Chayka (Yegor Afanasyev, Vasily Podkolzin) (PP)	4-1
38:20 – Egor Chinakhov (Ilya Safonov, Maxim Groshev)	5-1
	5-2	40:46 – Jere Sallinen (Valtteri Kemiläinen)
52:01 – Yegor Afanasyev (Shakir Mukhamadullin, Semen Chistyakov)	6-2

22 min
Penalties
35 min
26
Shots
19

7 November 2020; 13:30	Sweden	1-2 GWS (0-0, 1-1, 0-0) (OT: 0–0) (SO: 0–1)	Russia	Helsinki Halli, Helsinki; Attendance: 0

Game reference
Samuel Ersson	Goalies	Yaroslav Askarov	Referees: (Finland) Mikko Kaukokari (Finland) Joonas Kova
55:13 – Anton Wedin (Andreas Wingerli, Jesper Frödén) / 1-0; / 1-1 / 58:49 – Rodion Amirov (Vasily Podkolzin)			Referees: (Finland) Mikko Kaukokari (Finland) Joonas Kova
	Shootout	Podkolzin	Referees: (Finland) Mikko Kaukokari (Finland) Joonas Kova
6 min	Penalties	8 min	Referees: (Finland) Mikko Kaukokari (Finland) Joonas Kova
28	Shots	36	Referees: (Finland) Mikko Kaukokari (Finland) Joonas Kova

7 November 2020; 17:30	Finland	0-2 (0-1, 0-1, 0-0)	Czech Republic	Helsinki Halli, Helsinki; Attendance: 2,412

Game reference
Sami Rajaniemi	Goalies	Dominik Hrachovina	Referees: (Finland) Lassi Heikkinen (Finland) Kristian Vikman
0-1 / 12:28 – Andrej Nestrasil (Hynek Zohorna, Jakub Galvas); 0-2 / 20:31 – Jan Ordoš (Michal Moravčík, Radan Lenc)			Referees: (Finland) Lassi Heikkinen (Finland) Kristian Vikman
2 min	Penalties	10 min	Referees: (Finland) Lassi Heikkinen (Finland) Kristian Vikman
24	Shots	31	Referees: (Finland) Lassi Heikkinen (Finland) Kristian Vikman

8 November 2020; 13:30	Czech Republic	0-3 (0-1, 0-2, 0-0)	Russia	Helsinki Halli, Helsinki; Attendance: 0

Game reference

Lukas Parik
Goalies
Yaroslav Askarov
Referees:
(Finland) Kristian Vikman
(Finland) Joonas Kova

0-1	18:04 – Rodion Amirov (Egor Chinakhov, Daniil Chayka)
0-2	20:27 – Egor Chinakhov (Ilya Safonov)
0-3	28:55 – Yegor Afanasyev (Vasily Podkolzin, Shakir Mukhamadullin)

8 min
Penalties
2 min
29
Shots
30

8 November 2020; 17:30	Finland	3-2 (0-0, 1-2, 2-0)	Sweden	Helsinki Halli, Helsinki; Attendance: 3,214

Game reference

Sami Rajaniemi
Goalies
Niklas Rubin
Referees:
(Finland) Mikko Kaukokari
(Finland) Lassi Heikkinen

	0-1	20:18 – Max Friberg (John Nyberg, Linus Ölund)
	0-2	21:01 – Leon Bristedt (Daniel Zaar, Anton Wedin) (PP)
34:10 – Aleksi Saarela (Jere Sallinen, Vili Saarijärvi)	1-2
49:25 – Vili Saarijärvi (Jukka Peltola, Otto Karvinen)	2-2
57:33 – Valtteri Kemiläinen (Jere Innala, Eemeli Suomi) (PP)	3-2

12 min
Penalties
6 min
19
Shots
17

== Scoring leaders ==
Pos	Player	Country	GP	G	A	Pts	+/−	PIM	POS
1	Yegor Afanasyev	Russia	3	2	2	4	+2	0	F
2	Vasili Podkolzin	Russia	3	0	4	4	+3	0	F
3	Rodion Amirov	Russia	3	3	0	4	+2	0	F
4	Yegor Chinakhov	Russia	3	2	1	3	+3	0	F
5	Andrej Nestrašil	Czech Republic	3	1	2	3	+1	2	F

GP = Games played; G = Goals; A = Assists; Pts = Points; +/− = Plus/minus; PIM = Penalties in minutes; POS = Position
Source: quanthockey
