= Groshev =

Groshev (masculine, Russian: Грошев) or Grosheva (feminine, Russian: Грошева) is a Russian surname. Notable people with the surname include:

- Elena Grosheva (born 1979), Russian gymnast
- Maksim Groshev (born 1978), Russian footballer
- Yevgeni Groshev (1937–2013), Russian Soviet ice hockey player
- Momcilo Groshev (1960–2010), Macedonian goalkeeper

== See also ==
- Groshev GN-7, Soviet sailplane
