= List of Vegas Golden Knights draft picks =

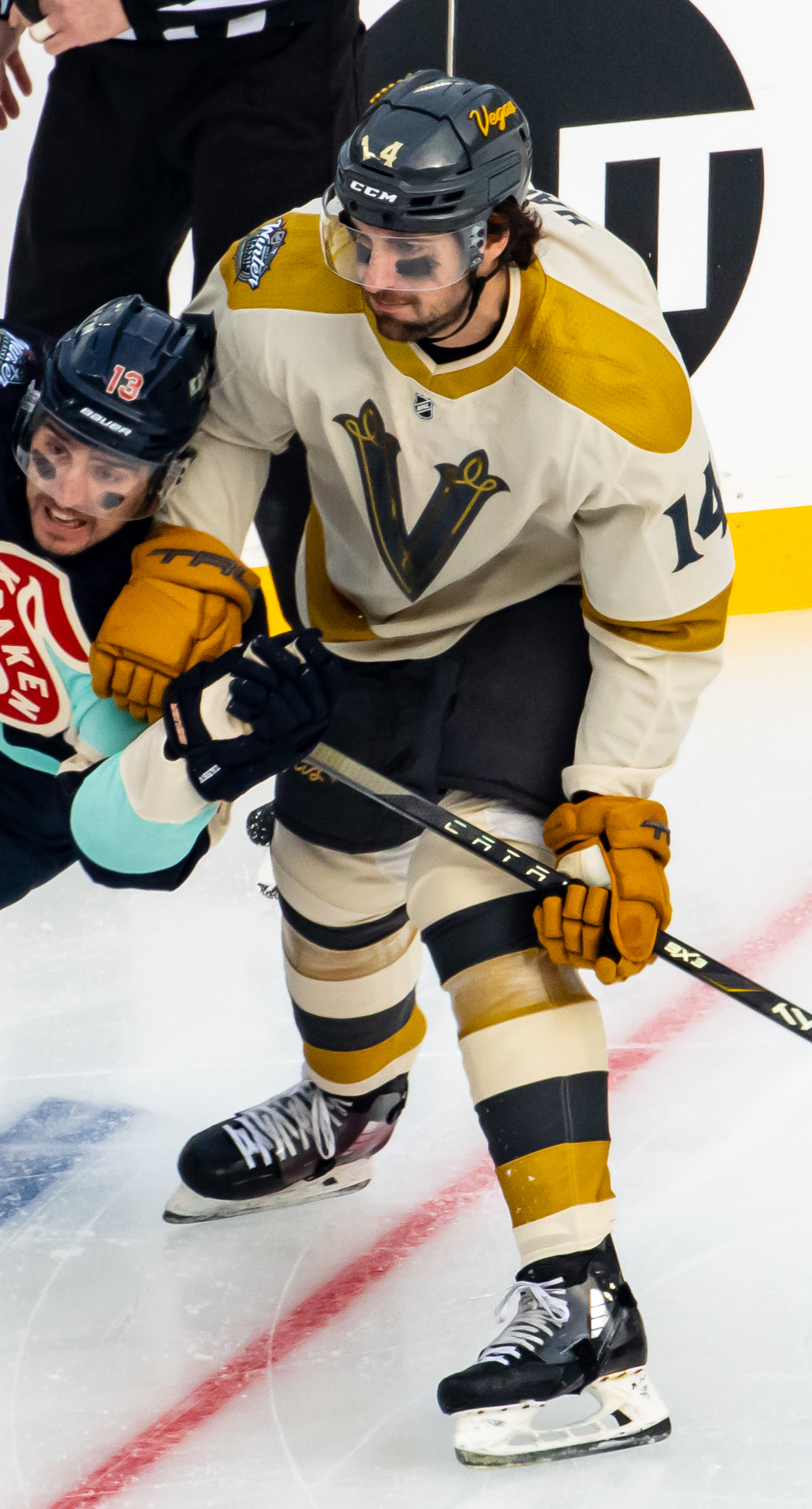
Nicolas Hague, selected 34th overall in the 2017 NHL entry draft, has played the most games with the Golden Knights of any of the franchise's draft picks.

The Vegas Golden Knights are a professional ice hockey franchise located in Las Vegas, Nevada. Founded ahead of the 2017–18 season as an expansion team, they play in the Pacific Division of the Western Conference in the National Hockey League (NHL). As of 2026, the Golden Knights have made 65 selections in ten entry drafts.

The NHL entry draft is held each off-season, allowing teams to select players who have turned 18 years old by September 15 in the year the draft is held. The draft order is determined by the previous season's order of finish, with non-playoff teams drafting first, followed by the teams that made the playoffs, with the specific order determined by the number of points earned by each team. The NHL holds a weighted lottery for the 16 non-playoff teams, allowing the winner to move up to the first overall pick. The team with the fewest points has the best chance of winning the lottery, with each successive team given a lower chance of moving up in the draft.

The Golden Knights first participated in the 2017 NHL entry draft, where they made Cody Glass their first-ever selection at sixth overall; additionally, they selected Nick Suzuki and Erik Brännström later in the first round. However, only Glass ultimately played for the Golden Knights, with Suzuki traded to the Montreal Canadiens ahead of the 2018–19 season, and Brännström traded to the Ottawa Senators during the same season. 2017 second-round pick Nicolas Hague has played the most games for the Golden Knights of any draft pick, with 364 games played between his debut in the 2019–20 season and his trade to the Nashville Predators following the 2024–25 season; Hague was also the only Golden Knights draft pick to play with the team in the 2023 Stanley Cup Final, with him and 2018 fifth-round pick Paul Cotter the only picks to subsequently be engraved on the Stanley Cup. Jiří Patera, selected in the sixth round in 2017, was the first goaltender drafted by the Golden Knights to appear for the team, with eight games played prior to his departure after the 2023–24 season.

== Key ==
^{†} Played at least one game with the Golden Knights.
* Spent entire NHL career with the Golden Knights.

General terms and abbreviations
Term or abbreviation	Definition
Draft	The year that the player was selected
Round	The round of the draft in which the player was selected
Pick	The overall position in the draft at which the player was selected

Position abbreviations
Abbreviation	Definition
G	Goaltender
D	Defense
LW	Left wing
C	Center
RW	Right wing
F	Forward

Abbreviations for statistical columns
Abbreviation	Definition
Pos	Position
GP	Games played
G	Goals
A	Assists
Pts	Points
PIM	Penalties in minutes
W	Wins
L	Losses
OT	Overtime/shootout losses
GAA	Goals against average
—	Does not apply

== Draft picks ==
Statistics are complete as of the 2025–26 NHL season and show each player's career regular season totals in the NHL. Wins, losses, overtime losses and goals against average apply to goaltenders and are used only for players at that position.

List of all players drafted by the Vegas Golden Knights and their career statistics (Note: Note: Hockey-Reference.com considers ties in the same category as overtime losses. As the Golden Knights were founded after the NHL abolished ties, they are not included on this table.)
Draft	Round	Pick	Player	Nationality	Pos	GP	G	A	Pts	PIM	W	L	OT	GAA
2017	1	6	Cody Glass^{†}	Canada	C	322	54	65	119	109	—	—	—	—
2017	1	13	Nick Suzuki	Canada	C	537	167	309	476	167	—	—	—	—
2017	1	15	Erik Brännström	Sweden	D	294	10	67	77	162	—	—	—	—
2017	2	34	Nicolas Hague^{†}	Canada	D	426	23	75	98	282	—	—	—	—
2017	2	62	Jake Leschyshyn^{†}	Canada	C	77	2	4	6	16	—	—	—	—
2017	3	65	Jonas Røndbjerg*	Denmark	RW	80	3	8	11	8	—	—	—	—
2017	4	96	Maksim Zhukov	Russia	G	—	—	—	—	—	—	—	—	—
2017	5	127	Lucas Elvenes	Sweden	C	—	—	—	—	—	—	—	—	—
2017	5	142	Jack Dugan	United States	LW	—	—	—	—	—	—	—	—	—
2017	6	158	Nick Campoli	Canada	C	—	—	—	—	—	—	—	—	—
2017	6	161	Jiří Patera^{†}	Czech Republic	G	9	0	0	0	0	3	4	1	4.01
2017	7	189	Ben Jones^{†}	Canada	C	56	1	2	3	12	—	—	—	—
2018	2	61	Ivan Morozov	Russia	C	—	—	—	—	—	—	—	—	—
2018	4	99	Stanislav Demin	United States	D	—	—	—	—	—	—	—	—	—
2018	4	115	Paul Cotter^{†}	United States	C	296	47	35	82	143	—	—	—	—
2018	5	135	Brandon Kruse	United States	LW	—	—	—	—	—	—	—	—	—
2018	5	154	Connor Corcoran	Canada	D	—	—	—	—	—	—	—	—	—
2018	6	180	Peter Diliberatore	Canada	D	—	—	—	—	—	—	—	—	—
2018	6	185	Xavier Bouchard	Canada	D	—	—	—	—	—	—	—	—	—
2018	7	208	Jordon Kooy	Canada	G	—	—	—	—	—	—	—	—	—
2019	1	17	Peyton Krebs^{†}	Canada	C	378	42	91	133	277	—	—	—	—
2019	2	41	Kaedan Korczak*	Canada	D	155	4	33	37	36	—	—	—	—
2019	3	79	Pavel Dorofeyev*	Russia	LW	231	92	57	149	74	—	—	—	—
2019	3	86	Layton Ahac	Canada	D	—	—	—	—	—	—	—	—	—
2019	4	110	Ryder Donovan	United States	C	—	—	—	—	—	—	—	—	—
2019	5	135	Isaiah Saville	United States	G	—	—	—	—	—	—	—	—	—
2019	5	139	Marcus Kallionkieli	Finland	LW	—	—	—	—	—	—	—	—	—
2019	5	141	Mason Primeau	Canada	C	—	—	—	—	—	—	—	—	—
2020	1	29	Brendan Brisson^{†}	United States	C	27	2	7	9	2	—	—	—	—
2020	3	68	Lukas Cormier*	Canada	D	2	0	1	1	0	—	—	—	—
2020	3	91	Jackson Hallum	United States	F	—	—	—	—	—	—	—	—	—
2020	5	125	Jesper Vikman	Sweden	G	—	—	—	—	—	—	—	—	—
2020	6	184	Noah Ellis	United States	D	—	—	—	—	—	—	—	—	—
2020	7	215	Maxim Marushev	Russia	C	—	—	—	—	—	—	—	—	—
2021	1	30	Zach Dean	Canada	C	9	0	0	0	6	—	—	—	—
2021	2	38	Daniil Chayka	Russia	D	—	—	—	—	—	—	—	—	—
2021	4	102	Jakub Brabenec	Czech Republic	C	—	—	—	—	—	—	—	—	—
2021	4	128	Jakub Demek	Slovakia	RW	—	—	—	—	—	—	—	—	—
2021	6	190	Artur Cholach	Ukraine	D	—	—	—	—	—	—	—	—	—
2021	7	222	Carl Lindbom*	Sweden	G	8	0	0	0	0	2	4	2	3.00
2022	2	48	Matyas Sapovaliv	Czech Republic	C	—	—	—	—	—	—	—	—	—
2022	3	79	Jordan Gustafson	Canada	C	—	—	—	—	—	—	—	—	—
2022	4	128	Cameron Whitehead	Canada	G	—	—	—	—	—	—	—	—	—
2022	5	145	Patrick Guay	Canada	C	—	—	—	—	—	—	—	—	—
2022	6	177	Ben Hemmerling	Canada	RW	—	—	—	—	—	—	—	—	—
2022	7	209	Abram Wiebe	Canada	D	4	0	0	0	2	—	—	—	—
2023	1	32	David Edstrom	Sweden	C	—	—	—	—	—	—	—	—	—
2023	3	77	Matheiu Cataford	Canada	C	—	—	—	—	—	—	—	—	—
2023	3	96	Arttu Karki	Finland	D	—	—	—	—	—	—	—	—	—
2023	6	192	Tuomas Uronen	Finland	RW	—	—	—	—	—	—	—	—	—
2024	1	19	Trevor Connelly	United States	LW	—	—	—	—	—	—	—	—	—
2024	3	83	Pavel Moysevich	Belarus	G	—	—	—	—	—	—	—	—	—
2024	6	180	Trent Swick	Canada	LW	—	—	—	—	—	—	—	—	—
2024	7	197	Lucas Van Vilet	United States	RW	—	—	—	—	—	—	—	—	—
2025	2	55	Jakob Ihs-Wozniak	Sweden	C	—	—	—	—	—	—	—	—	—
2025	3	85	Mateo Nobert	Canada	C	—	—	—	—	—	—	—	—	—
2025	6	186	Alexander Weiermair	United States	C	—	—	—	—	—	—	—	—	—
2025	6	187	Gustav Sjoqvist	Sweden	D	—	—	—	—	—	—	—	—	—
2026	1	29	Juho Piiparinen	Finland	D	—	—	—	—	—	—	—	—	—
2026	3	92	Ben Wilmott	United States	C	—	—	—	—	—	—	—	—	—
2026	3	95	Sean Burick	United States	D	—	—	—	—	—	—	—	—	—
2026	4	113	Jonah Sivertson	Canada	RW	—	—	—	—	—	—	—	—	—
2026	5	159	Will McLaughlin	Canada	D	—	—	—	—	—	—	—	—	—
2026	6	191	Matthew Minchak	United States	G	—	—	—	—	—	—	—	—	—
2026	7	207	Noel Pakarinen	Finland	LW	—	—	—	—	—	—	—	—	—

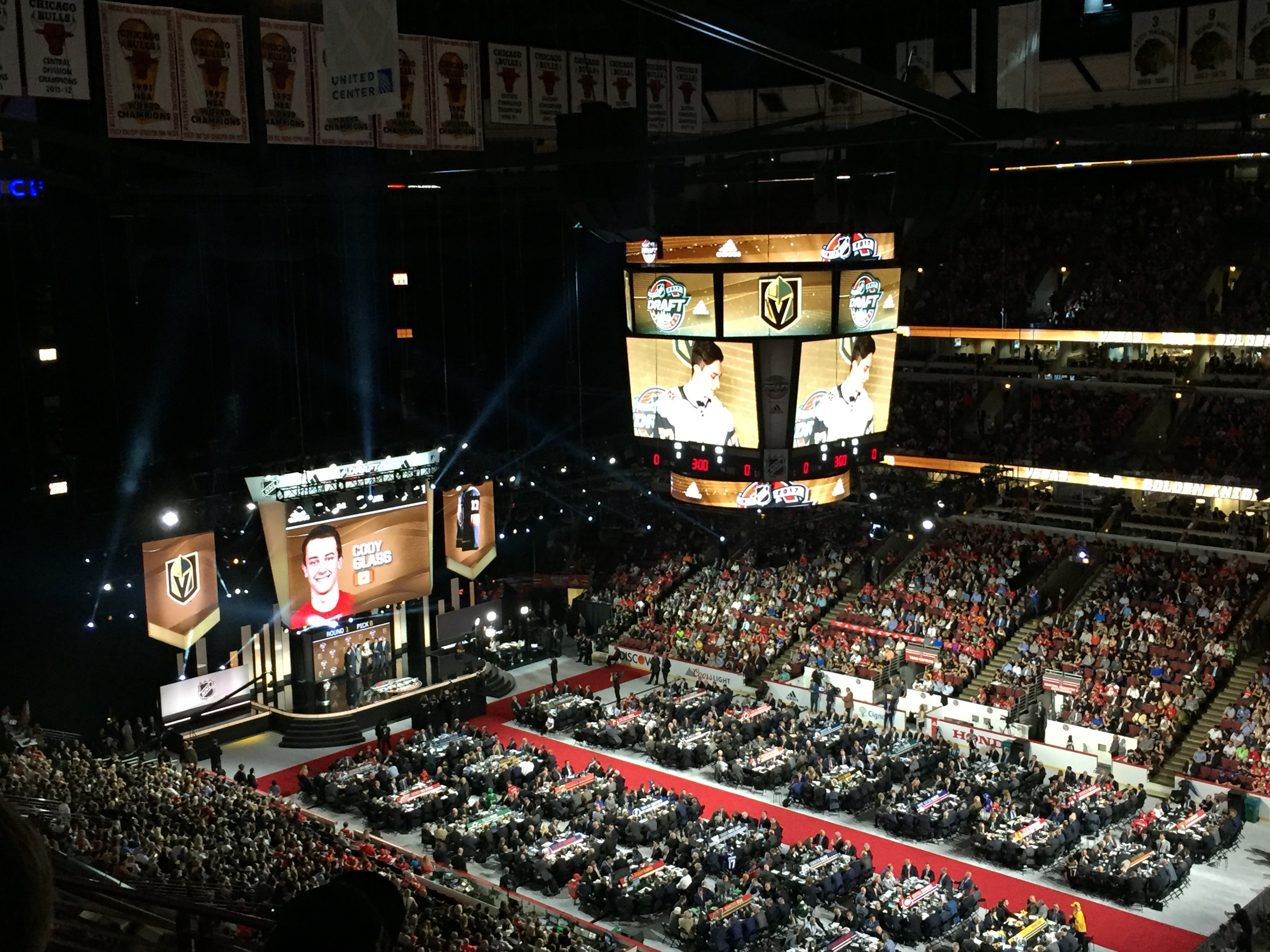
The 2017 NHL entry draft as the Golden Knights made Cody Glass their first ever selection, at 6th overall.

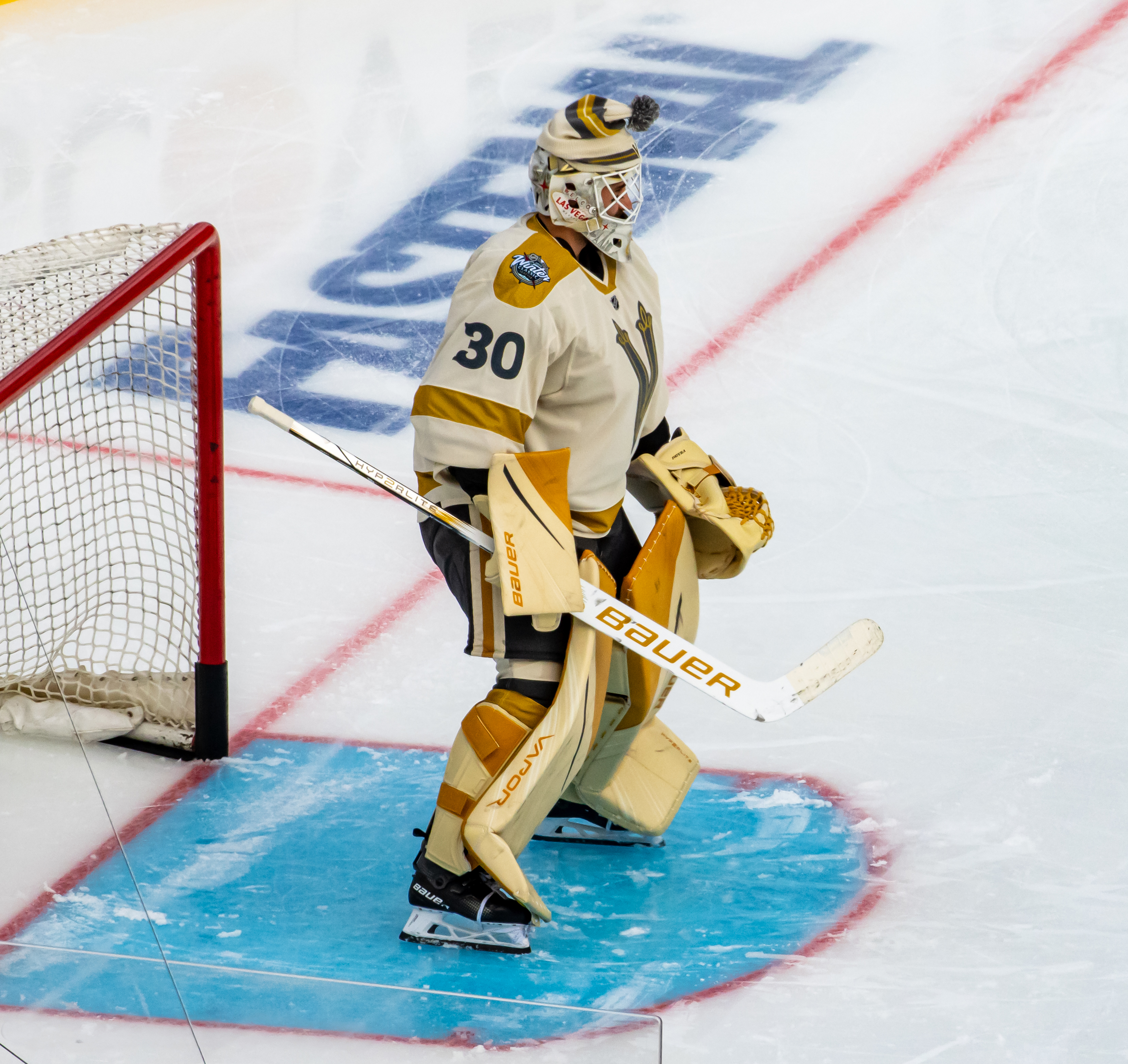
2017 161st overall pick Jiří Patera was the first goaltender drafted by the Golden Knights to appear for the team.

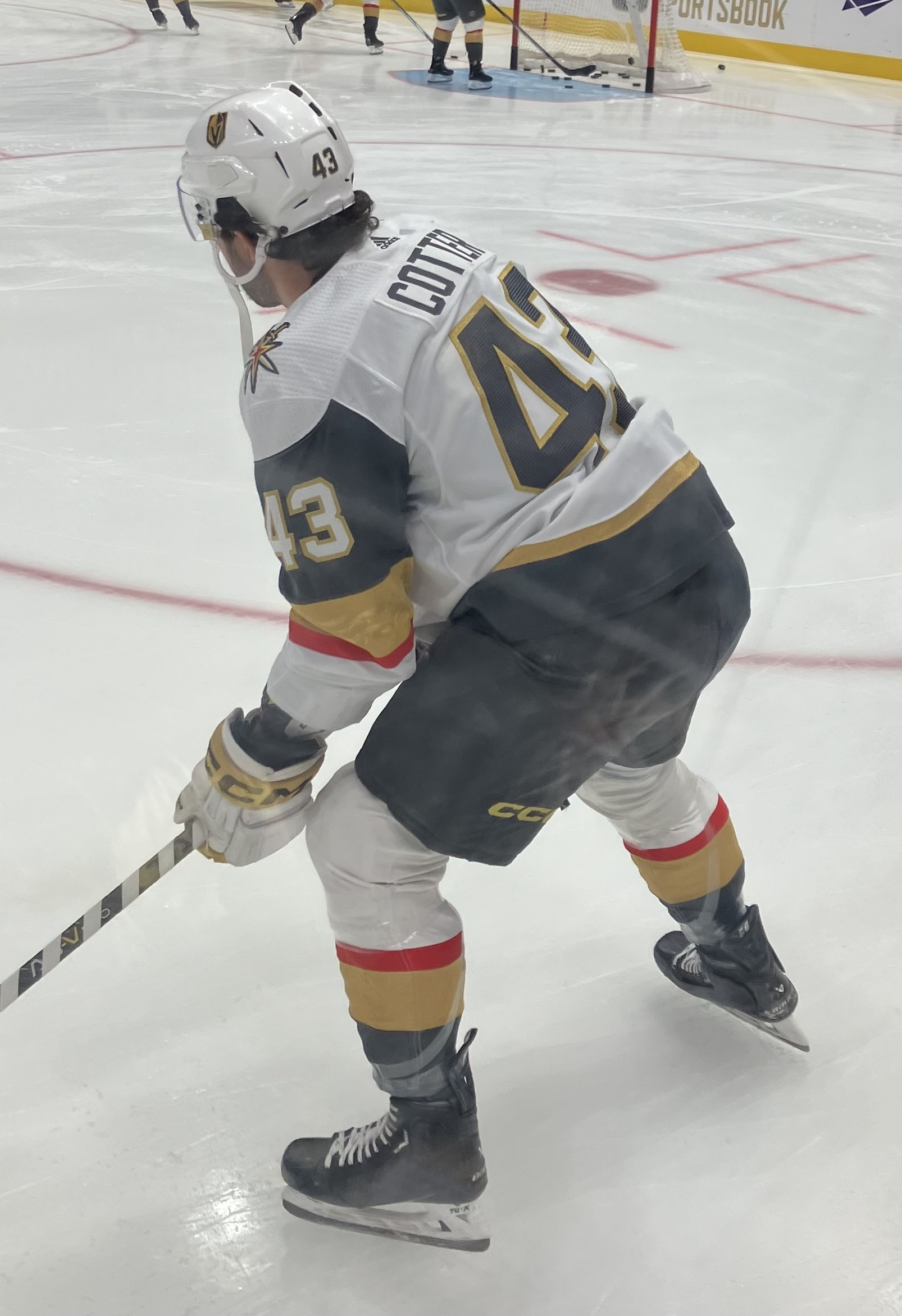
Paul Cotter, selected 115th overall in 2018, won the Stanley Cup with the Golden Knights in 2023.

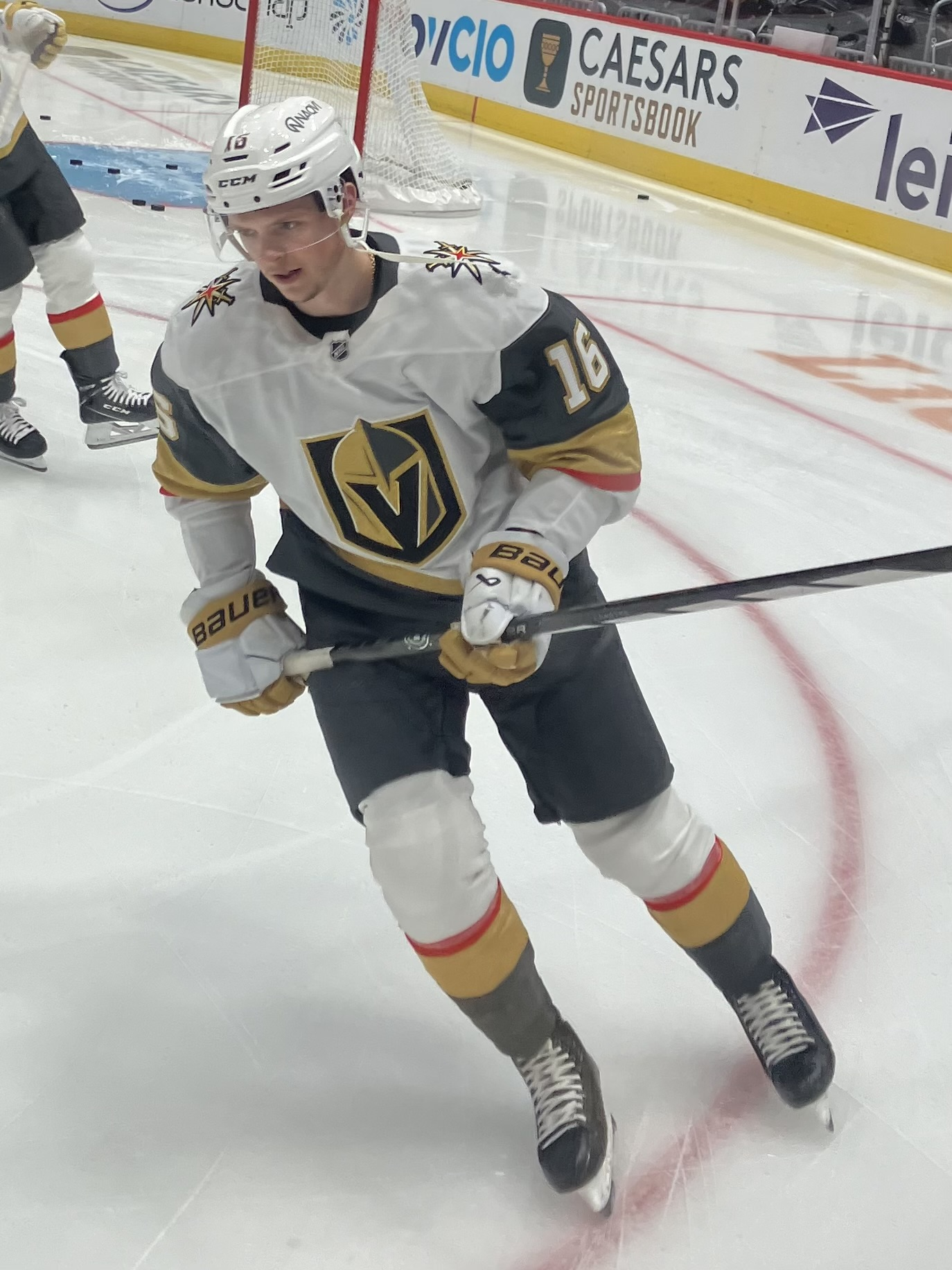
Pavel Dorofeyev, selected 79th overall in 2019, appeared in 231 games for the Golden Knights.

== See also ==
- 2017 NHL expansion draft
