= List of Swedish ice hockey junior champions =

The Swedish ice hockey junior championship (Swedish: Svenska juniormästare i ishockey) is a club championship contested in three age groups (20 years and younger, 18 years and younger and 16 years and younger) awarded annually to the winning playoff team of respective league or cup, the J20 SuperElit, the J18 Allsvenskan, and the U16 Swedish Championship.

The champion of the oldest age group wins the Anton Cup. Frölunda HC has won the most championships in the oldest age group, Leksands IF the most in the middle age group and Djurgårdens IF the most in the youngest age group.

== 20 years and younger (J20) ==
=== Previous winners ===
The previous winners and runner-ups are presented in the table below.

Season	Winners	Runners-up
1953	Djurgårdens IF (1)	Hammarby IK
1954	Leksands IF (1)	IFK Nyland
1955	Grums IK (1)	Södertälje SK
1956	Skellefteå AIK (1)	Hammarby IK
1957	Värmland (1)	Gästrikland
1958	Dalarna (1)	Värmland
1959	Dalarna (2)	Värmland
1960	Värmland (2)	Medelpad
1961	IFK Bofors (1)	Wifsta/Östrands IF
1962	AIK (1)	IF Älgarna
1963	Leksands IF (2)	Tyringe SoSS
1964	MoDo AIK (1)	Djurgårdens IF
1965	MoDo AIK (2)	VIK Västerås HK
1966	VIK Västerås HK (1)	MoDo AIK
1967	Skellefteå AIK (2)	MoDo AIK
1968	Timrå IK (2)	Bofors IK
1969	Timrå IK (3)	Leksands IF
1970	Leksands IF (3)	Timrå IK
1971	Leksands IF (4)	Färjestad BK
1972	Färjestad BK (1)	Brynäs IF
1973	Färjestad BK (2)	Leksands IF
1974	Färjestad BK (3)	IFK Luleå
1975	Leksands IF (5)	Tingsryds AIF
1976	Västra Frölunda IF (1)	Brynäs IF
1977	Brynäs IF (1)	Timrå IK
1978	Färjestad BK (4)	MoDo AIK
1979	Kiruna AIF (1)	Djurgårdens IF
1980	Färjestad BK (5)	AIK
1981	Skellefteå AIK (3)	Brynäs IF
1982	AIK (2)	Timrå IK
1983	Brynäs IF (2)	Leksands IF
1984	Södertälje SK (1)	Färjestad BK
1985	AIK (3)	Färjestad BK
1986	Leksands IF (6)	Djurgårdens IF
1987	Södertälje SK (2)	Leksands IF
1988	Djurgårdens IF (2)	AIK
1989	VIK Västerås HK (3)	Södertälje SK
1990	Leksands IF (7)	Södertälje SK
1991	MoDo HK (3)	Djurgårdens IF
1992	MoDo HK (4)	Leksands IF
1993	MoDo HK (5)	VIK Västerås HK
1994	Rögle BK (1)	Luleå HF
1995	Västra Frölunda HC (2)	Uppsala/AIS
1996	HV71 (1)	MoDo Hockey
1997	HV71 (2)	Malmö IF
1998	Malmö IF (1)	Rögle BK
1999	Färjestad BK (6)	Mora IK
2000	Västra Frölunda HC (3)	Hammarby IF
2001	Västra Frölunda HC (4)	Leksands IF
2002	Västra Frölunda HC (5)	MIF Redhawks
2003	Västra Frölunda HC (6)	HV71
2004	Modo Hockey (6)	MIF Redhawks
2005	Frölunda HC (7)	Luleå HF
2006	Linköpings HC (1)	Frölunda HC
2007	Frölunda HC (8)	Djurgårdens IF
2008	Frölunda HC (9)	Brynäs IF
2009	Brynäs IF (3)	HV71
2010	Leksands IF (8)	Brynäs IF
2011	Frölunda HC (10)	Skellefteå AIK
2012	Linköpings HC (2)	HV71
2013	HV71 (3)	Modo Hockey
2014	HV71 (4)	Färjestad BK
2015	Djurgårdens IF (3)	Frölunda HC
2016	Djurgårdens IF (4)	Skellefteå AIK
2017	Modo Hockey (7)	Växjö Lakers
2018	Växjö Lakers (1)	HV71
2019	Modo Hockey (8)	Linköpings HC
2020	Cancelled due to COVID-19 pandemic in Sweden	
2021	Cancelled due to COVID-19 pandemic in Sweden	
2022	Linköpings HC (3)	Djurgårdens IF
2023	Rögle BK (2)	Leksands IF
2024	Skellefteå AIK (4)	Örebro HK
2025	Djurgårdens IF (5)	Skellefteå AIK
2026	Djurgårdens IF (6)	Frölunda HC

=== Title champions ===
Titles	Club
10	Frölunda HC
8	Modo Hockey
7	Leksands IF
6	Djurgårdens IF
6	Färjestad BK
6	HV71
3	AIK
3	Brynäs IF
2	Dalarna
2	Linköpings HC
2	Skellefteå AIK
2	Södertälje SK
2	Timrå IK
2	Värmland
2	VIK Västerås HK
1	IFK Bofors
1	Kiruna AIF
1	Malmö Redhawks
1	Rögle BK
1	Växjö Lakers

== 18 years and younger (J18) ==
=== Previous winners ===
Season	Winners	Runners-up
1980	Färjestad BK (1)	Mora IK
1981	Södertälje SK (1)	Luleå HF
1982	Färjestad BK (2)	Stocksunds IF
1983	Södertälje SK (2)	HV71
1984	Leksands IF (1)	MoDo AIK
1985	Leksands IF (2)	Djurgårdens IF
1986	IK VIK-Hockey (1)	MoDo AIK
1987	Södertälje SK (3)	Rögle BK
1988	Skellefteå HC (1)	IK VIK-Hockey
1989	Färjestad BK (3)	VIK Västerås HK
1990	VIK Västerås HK (2)	MoDo HK
1991	Skellefteå HC (2)	Färjestad BK
1992	MoDo HK (1)	Leksands IF
1993	MoDo HK (2)	Leksands IF
1994	Hammarby IF (1)	Malmö IF
1995	Leksands IF (3)	Skellefteå AIK
1996	MoDo HK (3)	Skellefteå AIK
1997	Leksands IF (4)	Färjestad BK
1998	Västra Frölunda HC (1)	Färjestad BK
1999	Leksands IF (5)	MoDo Hockey
2000	Leksands IF (6)	MoDo Hockey
2001	Mora IK (1)	MoDo Hockey
2002	Västra Frölunda HC (2)	Huddinge IK
2003	Västra Frölunda HC (3)	Modo Hockey
2004	Västra Frölunda HC (4)	Luleå HF
2005	Frölunda HC (5)	Djurgårdens IF
2006	Färjestad BK (4)	Malmö Redhawks
2007	Färjestad BK (5)	Frölunda HC
2008	Djurgårdens IF (1)	Färjestad BK
2009	AIK (1)	Skellefteå AIK
2010	Brynäs IF (1)	Djurgårdens IF
2011	Frölunda HC (6)	Djurgårdens IF
2012	Rögle BK (1)	Skellefteå AIK
2013	Brynäs IF (2)	Modo Hockey

=== Title champions ===
Titles	Club
7	Leksands IF
6	Frölunda HC
5	Färjestad BK
4	MODO Hockey
3	Södertälje SK
2	Brynäs IF
1	AIK
1	Djurgårdens IF
1	Hammarby IF Hockey (1921–2008)
1	Mora IK
1	Rögle BK
1	Skellefteå AIK
1	VIK Västerås HK

== 16 years and younger (U16) ==
=== Previous winners ===
Season	Winners	Runners-up
1972	AIK (1)	MoDo AIK
1973	Leksands IF (1)	Färjestad BK
1974	Bofors IK (1)	Brynäs IF
1975	Timrå IK (1)	Bofors IK
1976	Kiruna AIF (1)	Djurgårdens IF
1977	Mora IK (1)	MoDo AIK
1978	Leksands IF (1)	Södertälje SK
1979	HV71 (1)	GroKo Hockey
1980	Stocksunds IF (1)	Rögle BK
1981	AIK (2)	Kiruna AIF
1982	Hammarby IF (1)	Färjestad BK
1983	Södertälje SK (1)	Nacka HK
1984	Östersunds IK (1)	Södertälje SK
1985	Djurgårdens IF (1)	Södertälje SK
1986	Rögle BK (1)	Färjestad BK
1987	AIK (3)	Södertälje SK
1988	AIK (4)	Djurgårdens IF
1989	Djurgårdens IF (2)	Färjestad BK
1990	Djurgårdens IF (3)	Kiruna AIF
1991	Djurgårdens IF (4)	HV71
1992	Huddinge IK (1)	Luleå HF
1993	Färjestad BK (1)	Brynäs IF
1994	MoDo HK (1)	Huddinge IK
1995	Djurgårdens IF (5)	MoDo HK
1996	MoDo HK (2)	Huddinge IK
1997	Djurgårdens IF (6)	Leksands IF
1998	Hammarby IF (2)	Borlänge HF
1999	Huddinge IK (2)	HV71
2000	AIK (5)	Strömsbro IF
2001	AIK (6)	Huddinge IK
2002	MoDo HK (3)	Almtuna IS
2003	Linköpings HC (1)	Västerås IK Ungdom
2004	MIF Redhawks (1)	Timrå IK
2005	Hammarby IF (3)	Spånga IS
2006	Malmö Redhawks (2)	VIK Västerås HK
2007	Djurgårdens IF (7)	Huddinge IK
2008	Malmö Redhawks (3)	Brynäs IF
2009	Djurgårdens IF (8)	AIK
2010	Frölunda HC (1)	SDE HF
2011	SDE HF (1)	Modo Hockey
2012	Djurgårdens IF (9)	Frölunda HC
2013	Färjestad BK (2)	Brynäs IF

=== Title champions ===
Titles	Club
9	Djurgårdens IF
6	AIK
3	Hammarby IF Hockey (1921–2008)
3	Malmö Redhawks
3	Modo Hockey
2	Färjestad BK
2	Huddinge IK
2	Leksands IF
1	Bofors IK
1	Frölunda HC
1	HV71
1	Kiruna AIF
1	Linköpings HC
1	Mora IK
1	Östersunds IK
1	Rögle BK
1	SDE HF
1	Södertälje SK
1	Stocksunds IF
1	Timrå IK

== See also ==
- List of Swedish ice hockey champions
