= Lukáš Galvas =

Czech ice hockey player (born 1979)

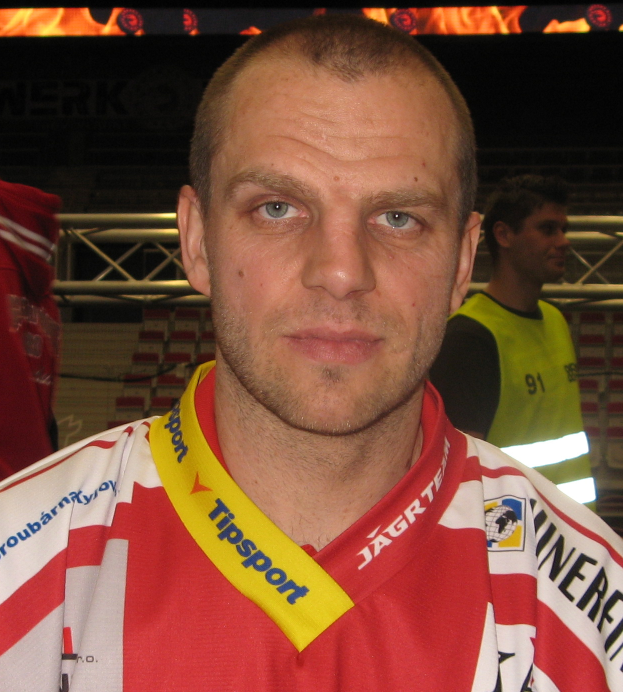
- Born: March 28, 1979 (age 47) Opava, Czechoslovakia
- Height: 5 ft 10 in (178 cm)
- Weight: 190 lb (86 kg; 13 st 8 lb)
- Position: Defence
- Shot: Left
- Played for: HC Vítkovice; HC Zlín; HC Karlovy Vary; HC Oceláři Třinec; HC Olomouc
- Playing career: 1997–2018

Lukáš Galvas (born March 28, 1979) is a Czech former professional ice hockey defenceman who played in the Czech Extraliga (ELH).

== Playing career ==
Galvas played with HC Zlín in the Czech Extraliga during the 2010–11 Czech Extraliga season.

During the 2016–17 Czech Extraliga season, Galvas made history with his son Jakub Galvas by being the first father and son in league history to play against one another.

In the following 2017–18 season, Galvas signed as a free agent with HC Olomouc, in order to play alongside his son, Jakub. In his final professional season of his 21-year career, he was paired defensively alongside his son recording 7 points in 38 games.

== Career statistics ==
			Regular season					Playoffs
Season	Team	League	GP	G	A	Pts	PIM	GP	G	A	Pts	PIM
1996–97	HC Vitkovice U20	Czech U20	—	—	—	—	—	—	—	—	—	—
1996–97	HC Vitkovice	Czech	8	0	0	0	2	2	0	0	0	0
1997–98	HC Vitkovice U20	Czech U20	—	—	—	—	—	—	—	—	—	—
1997–98	HC Vitkovice	Czech	29	0	3	3	31	8	0	0	0	4
1998–99	HC Vitkovice U20	Czech U20	—	—	—	—	—	—	—	—	—	—
1998–99	HC Vitkovice	Czech	39	0	6	6	30	4	0	0	0	27
1999–00	HC Vitkovice U20	Czech U20	3	1	0	1	4	1	0	0	0	2
1999–00	HC Vitkovice	Czech	47	1	9	10	34	—	—	—	—	—
2000–01	HC Vitkovice	Czech	34	0	3	3	65	10	1	3	4	16
2000–01	HC Slezan Opava	Czech2	1	0	1	1	2	—	—	—	—	—
2001–02	HC Vitkovice	Czech	52	4	19	23	42	12	1	3	4	10
2002–03	HC Hamé Zlin	Czech	46	1	5	6	40	—	—	—	—	—
2003–04	HC Energie Karlovy Vary	Czech	52	2	8	10	26	—	—	—	—	—
2004–05	HC Hamé Zlin	Czech	40	1	5	6	40	17	0	1	1	20
2005–06	HC Hamé Zlin	Czech	46	4	4	8	77	6	0	2	2	8
2006–07	HC Hamé Zlin	Czech	51	2	4	6	66	5	1	1	2	4
2007–08	HC Zlín	Czech	46	2	9	11	38	—	—	—	—	—
2008–09	HC Zlín	Czech	52	3	18	21	60	5	0	0	0	4
2009–10	HC Zlín	Czech	31	5	7	12	59	2	0	2	2	2
2010–11	HC Zlín	Czech	52	4	18	22	68	4	2	1	3	2
2011–12	HC Zlín	Czech	52	6	3	9	24	12	1	4	5	14
2012–13	HC Oceláři Třinec	Czech	41	2	12	14	16	13	0	3	3	10
2013–14	HC Oceláři Třinec	Czech	47	4	3	7	16	11	0	2	2	2
2014–15	HC Oceláři Třinec	Czech	48	1	6	7	28	16	2	3	5	6
2015–16	HC Oceláři Třinec	Czech	27	1	2	3	14	3	0	1	1	4
2016–17	HC Oceláři Třinec	Czech	33	0	1	1	36	6	0	1	1	10
2017–18	HC Olomouc	Czech	38	0	7	7	26	9	0	1	1	0
Czech totals			911	43	152	195	838	145	8	28	36	143
