= Cody Glass =

Canadian ice hockey player (born 1999)

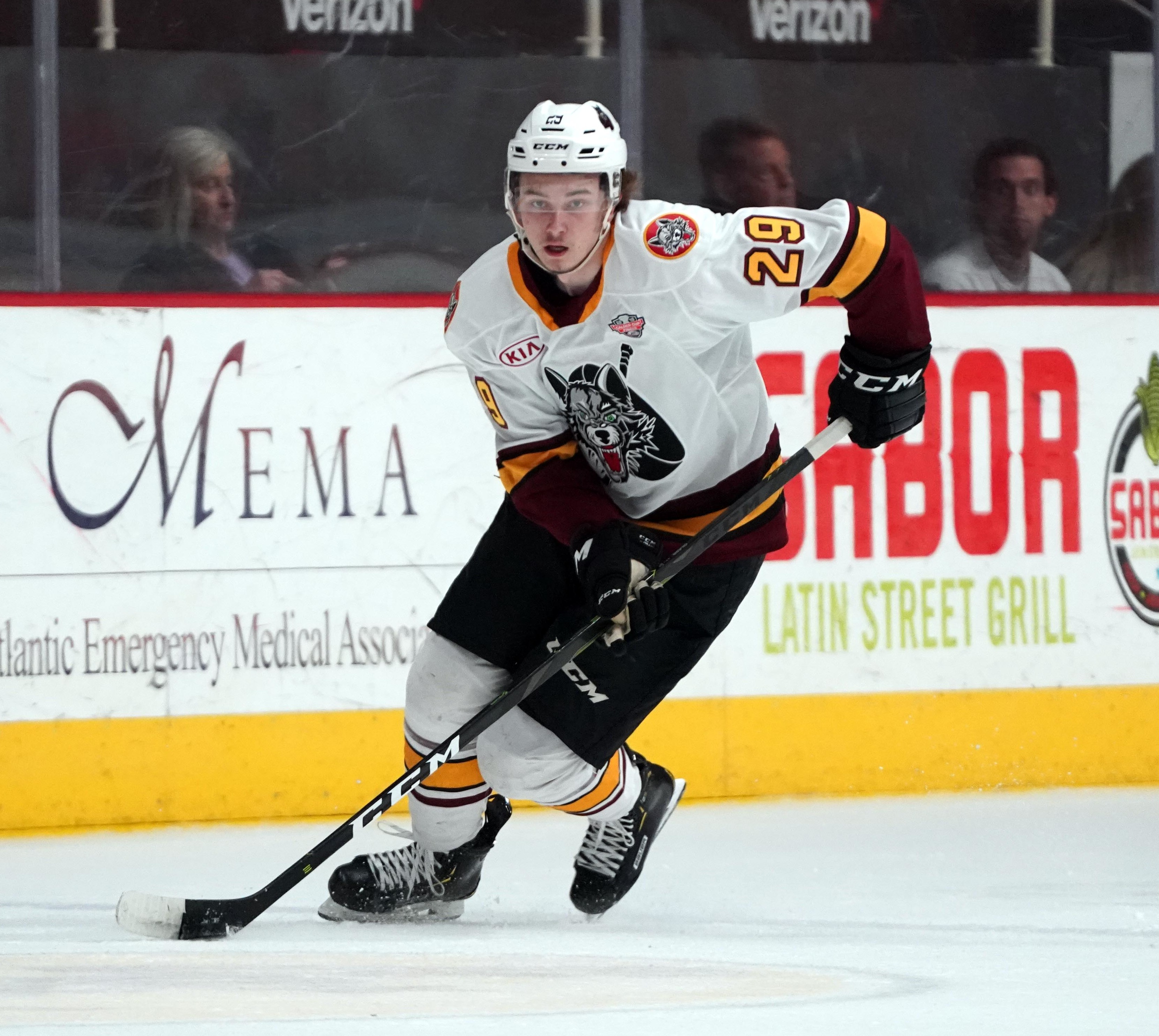
- Glass with the Chicago Wolves in 2019
- Born: April 1, 1999 (age 27) Winnipeg, Manitoba, Canada
- Height: 6 ft 2 in (188 cm)
- Weight: 201 lb (91 kg; 14 st 5 lb)
- Position: Forward
- Shoots: Right
- NHL team Former teams: New Jersey Devils; Vegas Golden Knights; Nashville Predators; Pittsburgh Penguins
- National team: Canada
- NHL draft: 6th overall, 2017; Vegas Golden Knights
- Playing career: 2019–present

Cody Glass (born April 1, 1999) is a Canadian professional ice hockey player who is a forward for the New Jersey Devils of the National Hockey League (NHL). Glass was the first-ever draft selection in Vegas Golden Knights franchise history, after he was drafted sixth overall in the 2017 NHL entry draft, and has also played for the Nashville Predators.

== Early life ==
Glass was born on April 1, 1999, in Winnipeg, Manitoba. His parents divorced in 2010 and he lived with his father alongside his brother Matthew. Glass' grandmother Judy helped support the family financially until her death in 2016.

== Playing career ==
=== Junior ===
Glass played AAA ice hockey with the Winnipeg Thrashers during the 2014–15 season, recording 55 points in 40 games. He was subsequently selected by the Portland Winterhawks of the Western Hockey League (WHL) in 1st round (19th overall) in the 2014 WHL bantam draft, after acquiring the pick in a trade with the Calgary Hitmen. In his rookie season, Glass was chosen to compete with Team Manitoba at the 2015 Canada Winter Games.

Early in the 2016–17 season, Glass quickly began rising in the draft rankings with his exceptional play. Initially rated a "C" level prospect by NHL Central Scouting in August, he was upgraded to "A" by November, indicating first-round potential. By the end of the season Glass was regarded as a top prospect of the 2017 NHL entry draft, with scouts praising his combination of playmaking, hockey sense and hands.

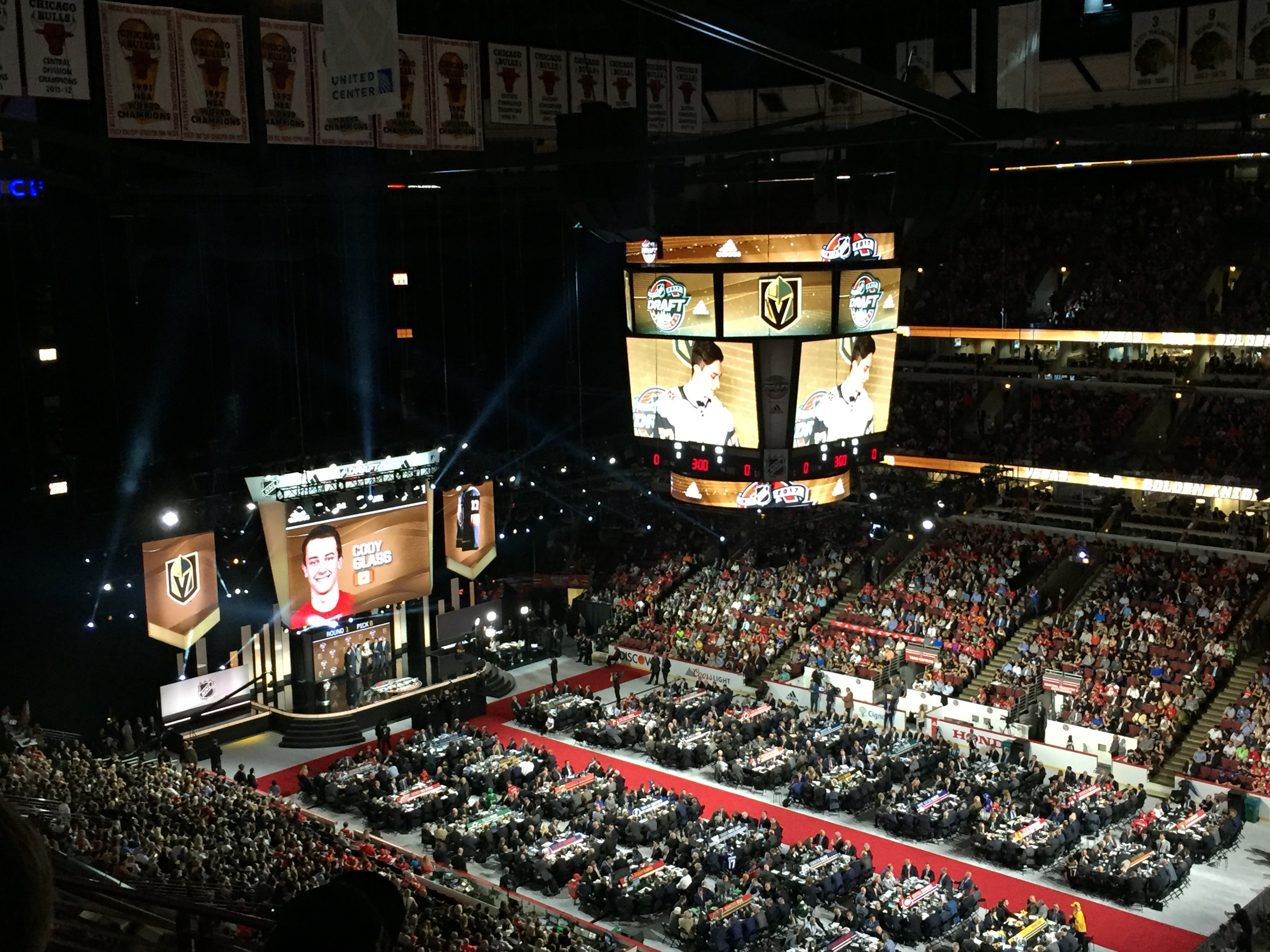
Glass was the Golden Knights first selection at the 2017 NHL entry draft.

Glass was drafted sixth overall by the Vegas Golden Knights in the 2017 NHL entry draft. He is the first-ever player drafted by the Golden Knights. On July 16, 2017, Glass agreed to a three-year, entry-level contract with the Vegas Golden Knights. Glass was invited to the Knights training camp before the 2017–18 season, however he was cut and reassigned to the Winterhawks before the final roster was announced. On March 31, 2018, Glass was named a Western Conference First Team All-Star and the Western Conference's Most Sportsmanlike Player. On April 17, Glass was assigned to the Golden Knights' American Hockey League (AHL) affiliate, the Chicago Wolves, after the Winterhawks were eliminated from the 2018 WHL playoffs. However, the Wolves were eliminated from the 2018 Calder Cup playoffs before Glass made an appearance for the team.

On September 25, 2018, prior to the 2018–19 season, Glass was reassigned to the Winterhawks, where he was named team captain. While with the Winterhawks, Glass was one of seven WHL players selected by Hockey Canada to attend their 2019 national junior team selection camp. On March 20, Glass was named to the 2018–19 WHL First All-Star Team.

=== Professional ===
After attending the Golden Knights training camp, Glass made his NHL debut in the Golden Knights' season opener against the San Jose Sharks on October 2, 2019. As a result, he became the first Golden Knights draft pick to play for the team. In that game, he recorded his first career NHL goal. During the 2019–20 season, Glass was elbowed by Brendan Lemieux of the New York Rangers who was fined $2,000 and he went through concussion protocol.

On July 17, 2021, the Golden Knights traded Glass to the Nashville Predators as part of a three-team trade also involving the Philadelphia Flyers. He spent the majority of his first season in the organization with the team's minor league affiliate, the Milwaukee Admirals. On July 1, 2023, the Predators signed Glass to a two-year, $5 million contract extension. On March 2, 2024, Glass scored his first career hat-trick in a 5–1 win against the Colorado Avalanche.

On August 13, 2024, Glass was traded to the Pittsburgh Penguins, alongside two draft picks, in exchange for Jordan Frasca. In the 2024–25 season with the Penguins, Glass struggled to replicate his previous offensive contributions, registering just 4 goals and 15 points through 51 appearances. At the NHL trade deadline, on March 7, 2025, Glass was dealt by the Penguins alongside Jonathan Gruden to the New Jersey Devils in exchange for Chase Stillman, the rights' to prospect Max Graham and a third-round pick in 2027.

== International play ==
Medal record

Representing Canada

Ice hockey

World Championships
Gold medal – first place	2023 Finland/Latvia	

On May 5, 2023, Glass was named to Canada senior team at the 2023 IIHF World Championship where he recorded four assists in ten games and won a gold medal.

== Player profile ==
Described as a quick-skating and mobile playmaker, Glass said he modeled his play after Patrice Bergeron. Teammate Max Pacioretty said "He [Glass] has the ultimate hockey tool, and that's hockey IQ and knowing where to be on the ice."

== Career statistics ==
=== Regular season and playoffs ===
			Regular season					Playoffs
Season	Team	League	GP	G	A	Pts	PIM	GP	G	A	Pts	PIM
2014–15	Winnipeg Thrashers	MMHL	40	23	32	55	26	8	2	2	4	6
2014–15	Portland Winterhawks	WHL	3	0	0	0	0	—	—	—	—	—
2015–16	Portland Winterhawks	WHL	65	10	17	27	20	4	1	2	3	0
2016–17	Portland Winterhawks	WHL	69	32	62	94	36	11	4	5	9	10
2017–18	Portland Winterhawks	WHL	64	37	65	102	26	12	4	9	13	2
2018–19	Portland Winterhawks	WHL	38	15	54	69	18	1	1	0	1	0
2018–19	Chicago Wolves	AHL	6	3	2	5	2	22	7	8	15	6
2019–20	Vegas Golden Knights	NHL	39	5	7	12	6	—	—	—	—	—
2019–20	Chicago Wolves	AHL	2	1	1	2	0	—	—	—	—	—
2020–21	Vegas Golden Knights	NHL	27	4	6	10	8	1	0	0	0	0
2020–21	Henderson Silver Knights	AHL	14	4	6	10	24	2	0	3	3	0
2021–22	Nashville Predators	NHL	8	0	1	1	0	2	0	0	0	0
2021–22	Milwaukee Admirals	AHL	66	14	48	62	20	7	1	5	6	2
2022–23	Nashville Predators	NHL	72	14	21	35	20	—	—	—	—	—
2023–24	Nashville Predators	NHL	41	6	7	13	20	—	—	—	—	—
2024–25	Pittsburgh Penguins	NHL	51	4	11	15	12	—	—	—	—	—
2024–25	New Jersey Devils	NHL	14	2	5	7	4	5	0	0	0	2
2025–26	New Jersey Devils	NHL	70	19	7	26	39	—	—	—	—	—
NHL totals			322	54	65	119	109	8	0	0	0	2

=== International ===
Year	Team	Event	Result	GP	G	A	Pts	PIM
2015	Canada Red	U17	4th	6	0	0	0	0
2017	Canada	U18	5th	3	2	1	3	0
2019	Canada	WJC	6th	5	2	4	6	2
2023	Canada	WC	1st place, gold medalist(s)	10	0	4	4	2
Junior totals				14	4	5	9	2
Senior totals				10	0	4	4	2

== Awards and honours ==
Award	Year	Ref
WHL
West First Team All-Star	2017, 2018, 2019	
Brad Hornung Trophy	2018	

Awards and achievements
Preceded by None	Vegas Golden Knights first-round draft pick 2017	Succeeded by Nick Suzuki
