= Nick Suzuki =

Canadian ice hockey player (born 1999)

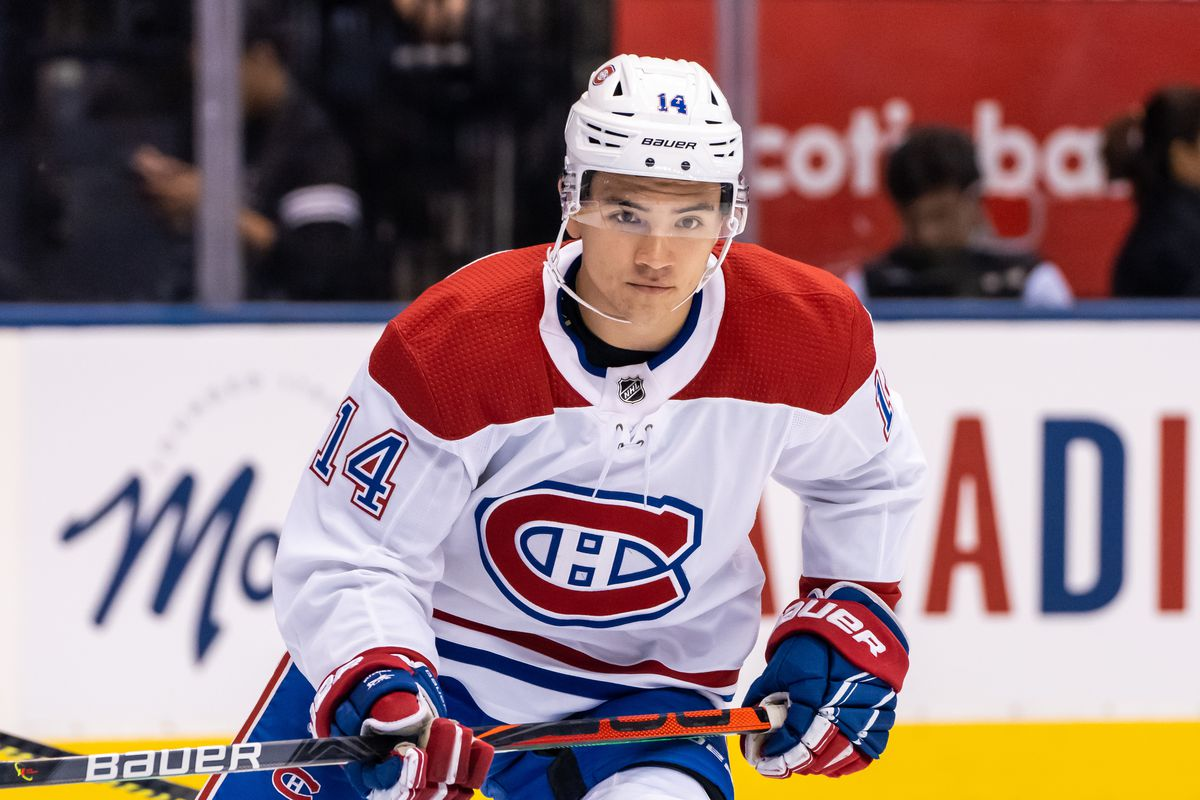
- Suzuki with the Montreal Canadiens in 2022
- Born: August 10, 1999 (age 27) London, Ontario, Canada
- Height: 5 ft 11 in (180 cm)
- Weight: 207 lb (94 kg; 14 st 11 lb)
- Position: Centre
- Shoots: Right
- NHL team: Montreal Canadiens
- National team: Canada
- NHL draft: 13th overall, 2017; Vegas Golden Knights
- Playing career: 2019–present

Nicholas Masaru James Suzuki (born August 10, 1999) is a Canadian professional ice hockey player who is a centre and captain for the Montreal Canadiens of the National Hockey League (NHL). He was selected in the first round, 13th overall, by the Vegas Golden Knights in the 2017 NHL entry draft. Known for his craftiness, Suzuki earned the nickname "Slick Nick".

== Early life ==
Suzuki was born on August 10, 1999, in London, Ontario, to parents Rob and Amanda. As a child, he suffered from several health conditions including hand, foot, and mouth disease, several bouts of pneumonia due to respiratory syncytial virus, and recurrent ear infections, the latter of which required surgery to insert tympanostomy tubes. Suzuki's health improved as he grew older, and he began ice skating at the age of three. He befriended his neighbour Isaac Ratcliffe, and the two began playing sports together when they were eight: ice hockey in the winter, and golf and soccer in the summer. Suzuki and Ratcliffe went on to play minor ice hockey together for the London Jr. Knights, where they led their team to the semifinals of the annual OHL Cup. After leading the league with 34 goals and 68 points in 31 games, Suzuki was named the ALLIANCE Hockey Player of the Year for the 2014–15 season.

== Playing career ==
=== Junior ===
==== Owen Sound Attack (2015–2018) ====
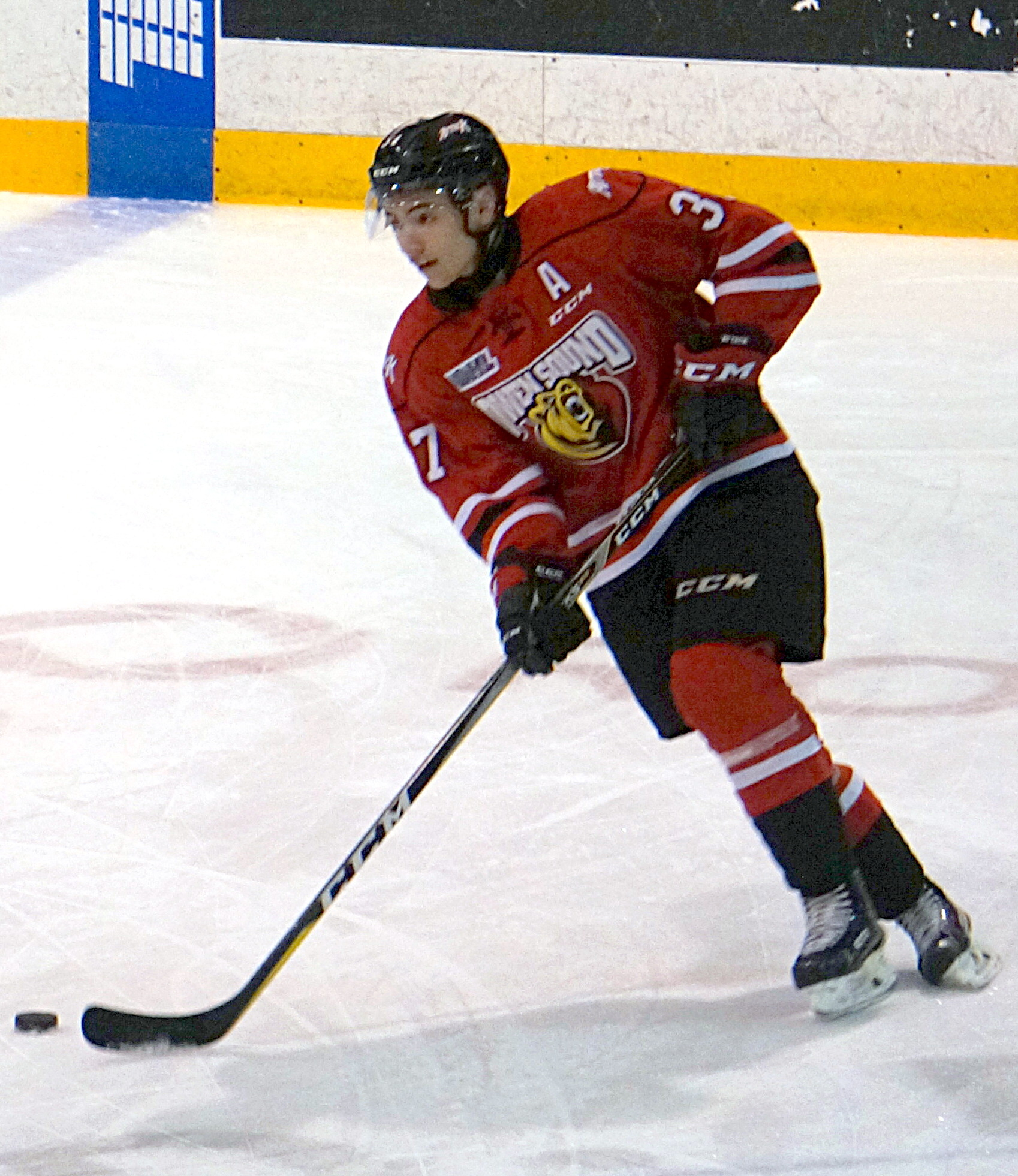
Suzuki with the Owen Sound Attack in 2017

Selected in the first round (14th overall) of the 2015 Ontario Hockey League (OHL) priority selection draft by the Owen Sound Attack, Suzuki signed with the team that June. He made an immediate impact upon his debut, with two goals and one assist through the first three games of the 2015–16 season. This included his first career major junior goal against the Kitchener Rangers on September 25. After finishing the first half of his rookie campaign with an overtime goal against the London Knights, Suzuki registered his first OHL hat-trick on January 30 in a 5–2 win over the Ottawa 67's. He scored his 20th goal of the year in the last regular-season game, a 7–3 loss to Kitchener, becoming the first Attack rookie to produce 20 goals in his 16-year-old season since Joey Hishon in 2008. With 38 cumulative points in 63 games played, Suzuki was the only 16-year-old in the OHL over the course of the season to score 20 or more goals. He added two more goals in six postseason games before the Knights eliminated Owen Sound in the first round. Thereafter, he was named to the OHL First All-Rookie Team at centre.

Entering the 2016–17 season, Suzuki, who had a goal and an assist in his first four games, was named a Player to Watch by the NHL Central Scouting Bureau. By mid-December, Suzuki was eighth in the OHL with 43 points and had already tied his previous season high of 20 goals. He was subsequently named to Team Cherry at the 2017 CHL/NHL Top Prospects Game. He was the top-ranked member of the Attack in the NHL Central Scouting Bureau's midterm report, named the number 16 North American skating prospect. Suzuki moved up to 10th in the final Central Scouting Rankings after ending the regular season with 45 goals and 96 points in 65 games. He added an additional eight goals and 23 points in 17 postseason games as the Attack reached the OHL Western Conference Finals, where they were eliminated by the Erie Otters in six games. At the end of his sophomore season, Suzuki was named to the OHL Second All-Star Team, and he also received both the William Hanley Trophy and the CHL Sportsman of the Year award after recording only 10 penalty minutes in 65 games. In June 2017, the Vegas Golden Knights of the National Hockey League (NHL) selected Suzuki in the first round, 13th overall, of that year's NHL entry draft, and signed him to an entry-level contract the following month.

Initially attending the Golden Knights' training camp prior to the 2017–18 season, Suzuki would be reassigned to Owen Sound on September 22. Upon his return, he was named an assistant captain for the Attack. Suzuki recorded several milestones over the course of the ensuing OHL season. On February 3, 2018, he registered his 200th OHL point with an assist on Kevin Hancock's goal against the Kitchener Rangers. His 100th OHL goal came on March 10, in a 3–0 win over the Saginaw Spirit. One week later, Suzuki earned his 100th point of the season, scoring two goals and recording an assist against the Sarnia Sting. He became the fifth Attack player in history to record a 100-point season, and the first since Bobby Ryan during the 2006–07 season. Suzuki finished his third OHL season with 42 goals and 58 assists in 64 games, and he was awarded his second consecutive William Hanley Trophy after recording only 18 penalty minutes during the season.

Owen Sound began the 2018 OHL playoffs with a first-round sweep of the London Knights, during which Suzuki recorded one goal and six points. They were subsequently eliminated the following round by the Sault Ste. Marie Greyhounds in seven games, whereas Suzuki finished the postseason with three goals and 12 points in 11 games. After his OHL season concluded, the Golden Knights assigned Suzuki to the Chicago Wolves, their American Hockey League (AHL) affiliate, for that year's Calder Cup playoffs. Despite being swept by the Rockford IceHogs in the first round, Suzuki made a brief appearance in the final game of the series.

==== Guelph Storm (2018–2019) ====
On September 10, 2018, the Golden Knights traded Suzuki, as well as Tomáš Tatar and a second-round pick in the 2019 NHL entry draft, to the Montreal Canadiens in exchange for veteran forward Max Pacioretty. He attended training camp with the Canadiens before returning to Owen Sound for the 2018–19 season as captain of the Attack. After scoring 22 goals and 45 points through the first 30 games of the OHL season, Suzuki was part of another trade on January 9, 2019, that sent himself, Zachary Roberts, and Sean Durzi to the Guelph Storm in exchange for forwards Zachary Pointer and Barret Kirwin, defenceman Mark Woolley, and picks in the next four OHL priority selection drafts. On February 20, he recorded his 300th OHL point with an assist on Dmitri Samorukov's game-winning overtime goal against the Flint Firebirds. A natural centre, Suzuki spent more time on the right wing after the trade. He was moved back to centre at the end of February, with Nate Schnarr and longtime friend Isaac Ratcliffe on his wings. This line proved quickly successful, combining for 19 goals and 48 points in a six-game span, including five goals and 20 points from Suzuki. He scored 12 goals and recorded 49 points in 29 games following the midseason trade, finishing the season with 34 goals and 94 points in 59 games between the two teams. Suzuki was named to the league's 2019 Third All-Star Team, and likewise received his third consecutive William Hanley Trophy for recording just 12 penalty minutes over the course of the season.

After sweeping the Kitchener Rangers in the first round of the 2019 OHL playoffs, during which Suzuki and Ratcliffe combined for six goals and 13 points, Guelph quickly fell into a 3–0 series deficit against the London Knights. Suzuki contributed eight points in the next three games to even the series and force a winner-take-all Game 7. After defeating the Knights, Guelph faced the Saginaw Spirit in the OHL Western Conference Finals. They came back to win the series from a 3–1 deficit, and Suzuki collected seven goals and 17 points in seven games. Facing the Ottawa 67's in Game 4 of the OHL championships, Suzuki recorded his 38th postseason point, a single-season franchise record for the Storm. Guelph won the J. Ross Robertson Cup in six games, and Suzuki, who had 16 goals and 42 points in 24 games, was named recipient of the Wayne Gretzky 99 Award as the league's Playoff MVP. Guelph then advanced to the 2019 Memorial Cup, where they were defeated by the Quebec Major Junior Hockey League (QMJHL) champion Rouyn-Noranda Huskies in the semifinal. Suzuki recorded three goals and seven points in the process, and received the George Parsons Trophy as the tournament's most sportsmanlike player. He finished his major junior career with 141 goals and 328 points in four OHL seasons between Owen Sound and Guelph.

=== Professional ===
==== 2019–2022 ====
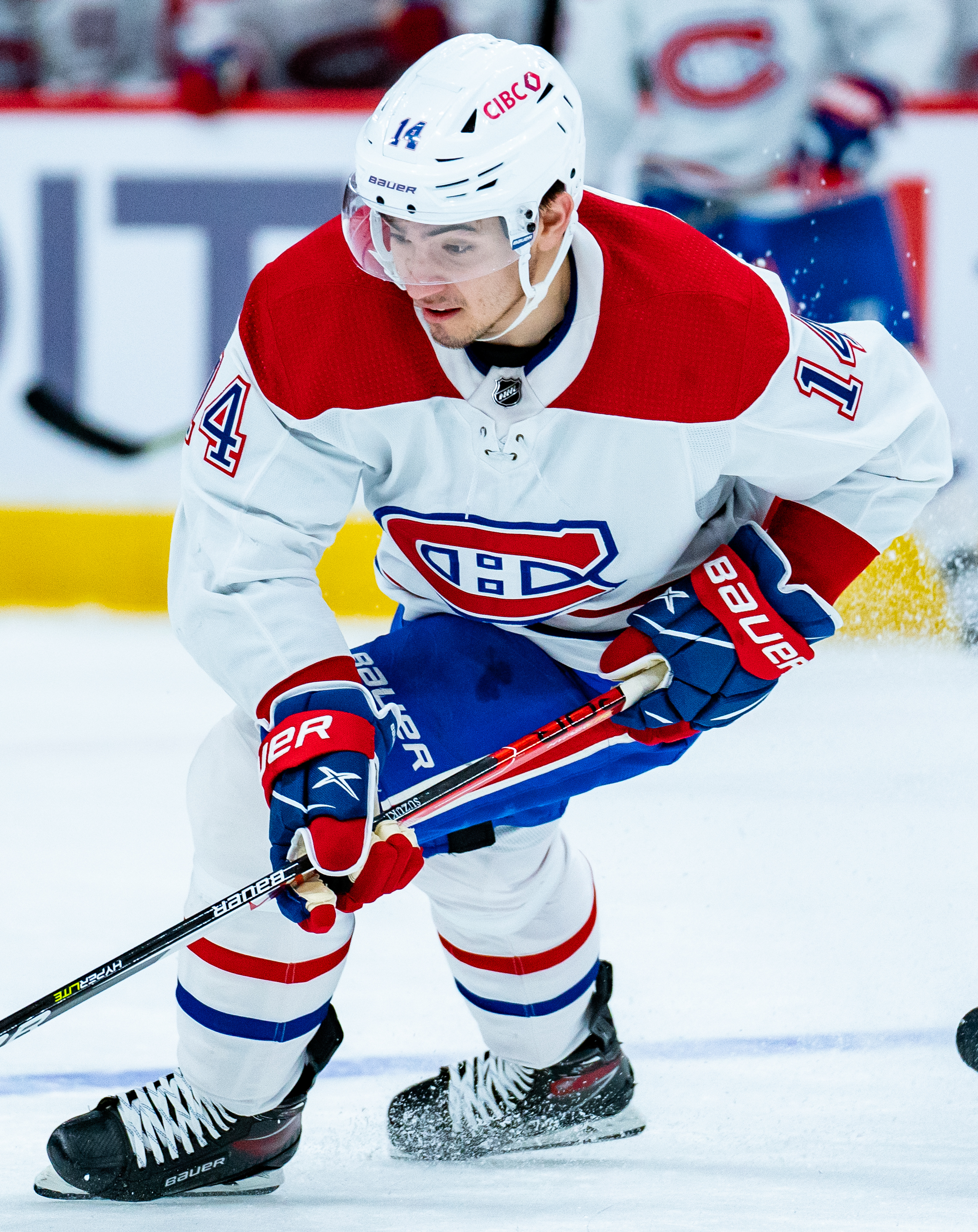
Suzuki with the Canadiens in 2021

After making an impression on general manager Marc Bergevin during training camp, Suzuki was named to the Canadiens' opening-night roster for the 2019–20 season. He made his NHL debut on October 3, 2019, a 4–3 shootout loss to the Carolina Hurricanes. Five days later, Suzuki assisted on Joel Armia's goal against the Buffalo Sabres to earn his first career NHL point. Suzuki's first career NHL goal came in just his seventh game played, when he scored on Alex Stalock in a 4–0 shutout victory over the Minnesota Wild. With this, he and defenceman Victor Mete became the first Montreal teammates to score their first career goals in the same game since Chris Higgins and Alexander Perezhogin in 2005. Alternating between centre and wing, Suzuki had seven goals and 19 points by the NHL's midseason holiday break. On February 8, 2020, Suzuki recorded his 35th point with an assist on Ilya Kovalchuk's game-winning goal against the Toronto Maple Leafs. He was the first Montreal rookie to register that many points since Higgins during the 2005–06 season. With four goals and 10 points in the month of February, including a team-leading five power play points, Suzuki was awarded the Molson Cup as Montreal's player of the month. At the time that the regular NHL season was suspended indefinitely due to the COVID-19 pandemic, Suzuki had 13 goals and 41 points in 71 games. He was one of only three players to appear in every regular-season game, and his 41 points were second to Guy Lafleur for the most of any Montreal rookie aged 20 or younger.

With the NHL forgoing the remainder of the regular season to begin the 2020 Stanley Cup playoffs that July, Suzuki was one of 31 players selected to join the team in Toronto. He scored his first postseason NHL goal in the first game of the Stanley Cup qualifiers, putting Montreal up 2–0 in an eventual 3–2 win over the Pittsburgh Penguins. Advancing to the Eastern Conference First Round, the Canadiens would lose to the Philadelphia Flyers in six games. Suzuki finished with four goals and seven points in 10 games, tying Jonathan Drouin for the most of any Canadiens skater in that year's playoffs. At the end of the season, he was named to the annual NHL All-Rookie Team.

Starting the 2020–21 season on the top offensive line with Drouin and Josh Anderson, Suzuki began the year on a six-game point streak. That early-season momentum failed to carry forward: through 18 games, the Canadiens' four centres scored only eight goals, four of which were from Suzuki. By midseason, Suzuki had 18 points in 28 games and was on an eight-game scoring drought. At the NHL trading deadline, Bergevin acquired veteran Eric Staal to act as a mentor for Suzuki and Jesperi Kotkaniemi, both of whom were struggling with consistency. Suzuki also benefited from the late-season addition of Cole Caufield, who joined the Canadiens after finishing his collegiate career with the Wisconsin Badgers. After Caufield set up Suzuki's game-tying goal against the Edmonton Oilers on May 12, the latter told reporters that the "chemistry is there" between them. Collectively, Suzuki finished the regular season with 15 goals and 41 points in 56 games played.

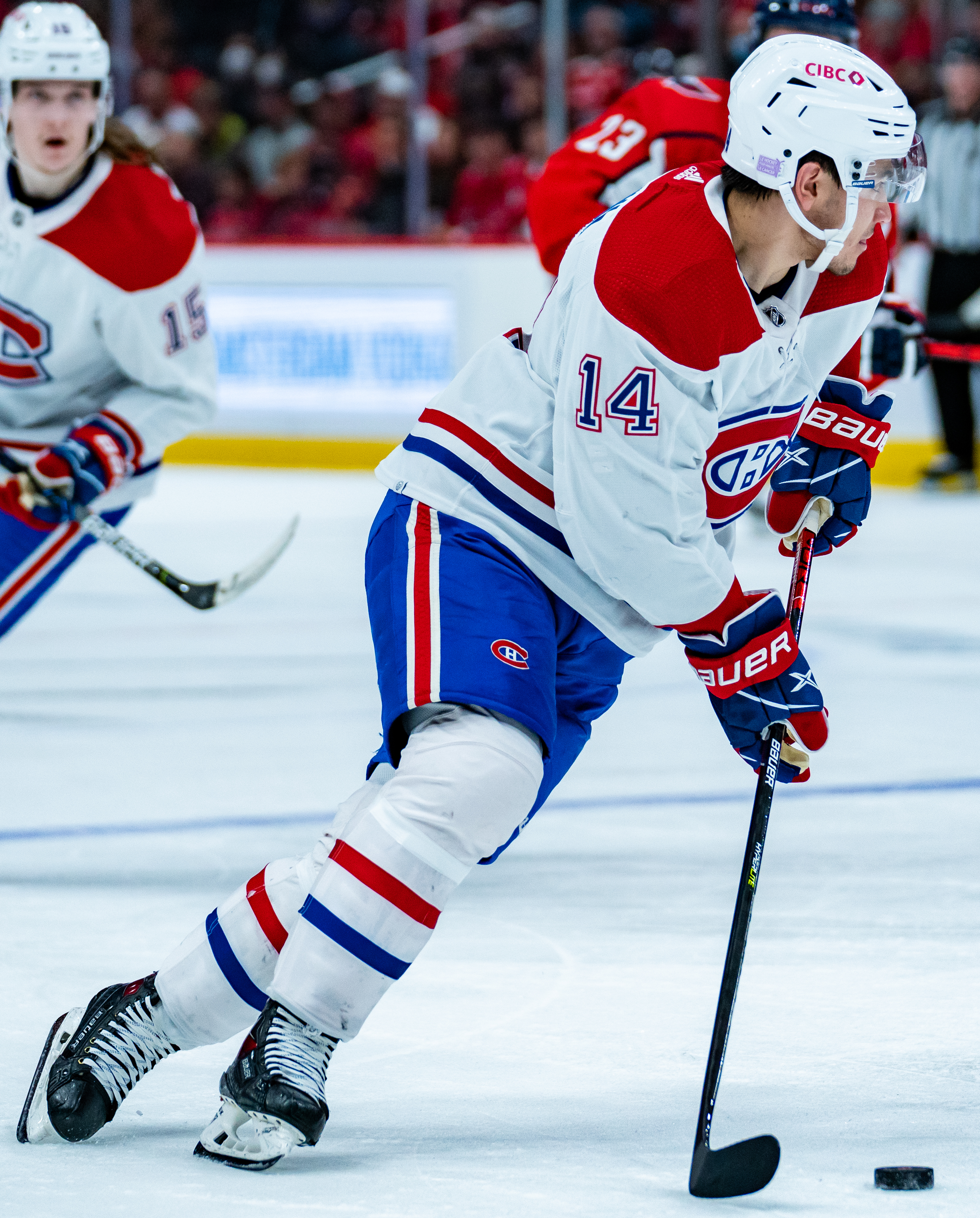
Suzuki with the Canadiens in 2021

During the ensuing 2021 Stanley Cup playoffs, Suzuki and the Canadiens would face the Toronto Maple Leafs in the first round. After Toronto took a 3–1 series lead, Suzuki scored the overtime winner in Game 5 to extend the series. Montreal would then take the series in seven games, moving on to play the Winnipeg Jets in the second round. Sweeping the Jets in four games, Suzuki for his part would contribute four goals and eight points through the first 11 games of the postseason. After defeating the Vegas Golden Knights in six games, the Canadiens faced the Tampa Bay Lightning in the 2021 Stanley Cup Finals, being the first time a Canadian team reached the Finals since the Vancouver Canucks ten years prior. The Canadiens eventually lost the series in five games, whereas Suzuki finished the postseason with seven goals and 16 points in 22 games.

On October 12, 2021, Suzuki signed an eight-year, $63 million extension with the Canadiens, which would carry through the 2029–30 NHL season. He also served as one of several alternate captains for Montreal during the 2021–22 season. After recording four goals and ten points in 14 games, Suzuki was presented the Canadiens' Molson Cup for the month of November. On December 7, Suzuki collected his 100th career NHL point with an assist in Montreal's 3–2 loss to the Lightning. With this, he became the ninth-youngest skater to record 100 points with Montreal and, doing so in 154 games, the third-fastest of any Canadien since 1996. In January, Suzuki, who led the team with 19 points in 35 games, was named Montreal's representative for the 2022 NHL All-Star Game in Las Vegas. On February 9, the Canadiens, who were last in the league with an 8–30–7 record, fired head coach Dominique Ducharme and appointed Martin St. Louis to the role on an interim basis. Shortly thereafter, St. Louis placed Caufield and Anderson on the top line alongside Suzuki. In their first game together, the line combined for seven points as Montreal won 5–2 against Toronto. Suzuki's 40th point of the season came on March 5, his 12th point in a seven-game stretch. Suzuki and Caufield were both honoured with the Molson Cup for March after scoring seven goals apiece in 15 games. On April 16, Suzuki scored his 20th goal of the season against the Washington Capitals, while his 60th point came on April 27 against the New York Rangers. Although Montreal failed to reach the 2022 Stanley Cup playoffs, Suzuki nonetheless managed to set career highs with 21 goals and 61 points, while his 209 consecutive games gave him the seventh-longest iron man streak among active players. At the end of the season, Suzuki was named as the Canadiens' Molson Cup recipient.

==== 2022–present ====
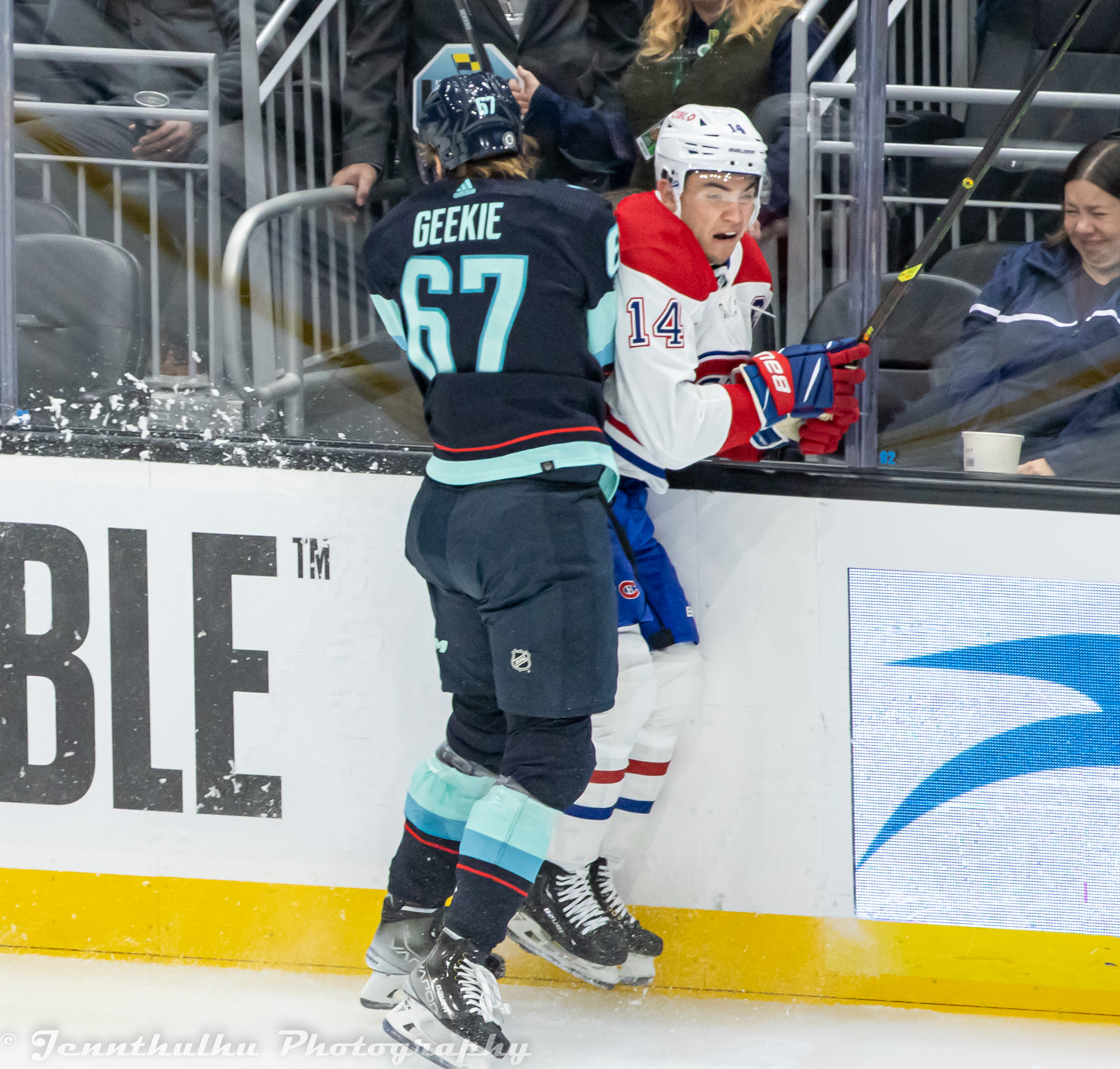
Suzuki during a game against the Seattle Kraken in 2022

Prior to the 2022–23 season, Suzuki succeeded Shea Weber as captain of the Canadiens, becoming the 31st overall for the franchise and, at 23 years old, the youngest in team history on September 12, 2022. Veteran players Joel Edmundson and Brendan Gallagher were subsequently named alternate captains.

In what was expected to be a development year for the rebuilding Canadiens, coach St. Louis began experimenting with different players in the other wing position to complement the established duo of Suzuki and Caufield on the team's first line. The early stages saw Anderson, Sean Monahan and Mike Hoffman rotate through before being nextly given to Kirby Dach, the former 2019 third overall selection acquired by the Canadiens in the off-season, whom had held the initial expectation that he would play centre. Generating strong initial results as a unit, the team once again became plagued by injuries by the second half of the season, with Caufield being ruled out indefinitely due to shoulder surgery, while Dach, who also missed time, returned to the lineup and assumed position as second-line centre. After seeing his scoring pace fall off as a result, Suzuki saw a late-season surge, highlighted by a four-game sequence where he managed ten points, tying his career high of 61 points with nine games remaining in the season. He would be named the NHL's second star of the week of March 20–26, the first such recognition in his career. Finishing the season with 26 goals (sharing the team lead with Caufield) and 66 overall points, he would also be the Canadiens' sole representative at the All-Star Game that season and won the Molson Cup as the best franchise player for the second consecutive year.

Suzuki began the 2023–24 season with only marginal point production in the opening stretch of games, attracting some criticism, but began to improve his totals by late October. On October 30, he played his 300th career NHL game, coincidentally against the Golden Knights, the team that had initially drafted him. He scored a goal in regulation and the Canadiens' only shootout goal in a 3–2 loss. He had, to that point, seven points in seven career games against Vegas. In early 2024, Suzuki was chosen to represent the Canadiens at the All-Star Game for the third consecutive year. He was also named the NHL's third star for the week of February 5–11, having had four goals and two assists across three games, which included having points on six of the Canadiens' nine goals in those games. After a rotation of wingers joined Suzuki and Caufield on the top line during the early part of the season, the team's first overall draft pick in 2022, Juraj Slafkovský, gradually established himself as a regular presence alongside them, a combination which would enjoy strong results. On March 5, Suzuki scored his 100th career NHL goal, the overtime winner in a 3–2 win over the Nashville Predators. Continuing to hit new milestones over the course of the season, he hit the 30-goal threshold on March 28 in a 4–1 victory over the Philadelphia Flyers. With two goals in a 5–3 win over the Florida Panthers on April 2, Suzuki would reach the 70-point mark for the first time in his career while also becoming the fifth Canadiens player to do so amidst the salary cap era. Amassing a team-leading 33 goals and 77 points, he received his third consecutive Molson Cup honour. He was also the Canadiens' nominee for the King Clancy Memorial Trophy, which is awarded annually to the NHL player who "best exemplifies leadership qualities on and off the ice and who has made a noteworthy humanitarian contribution in his community," citing his charitable efforts.

Suzuki reached a number of career milestones in the early stages of the 2024–25 season. On November 11, 2024, he registered his 300th career NHL point in a 7–5 win over the Buffalo Sabres, while he skated in his 400th career NHL game on December 7 versus the Washington Capitals. On December 21, Suzuki contributed two assists in a 5–1 win over the visiting Detroit Red Wings, reaching and then surpassing the 200-assist threshold in the process. After registering nine points through eight games during the month of February, including a stretch of three goals and four assists through the Canadiens' final three games of the monthly schedule, he would be named the NHL's third star of the week for the period ending on March 2, 2025. On April 3, Suzuki reached the 80-point mark, becoming the first player to reach that point total for the franchise since Alex Kovalev in 2007–08. Two days later, he surpassed 82 points on the season, securing a point-per-game (PPG) production over the course of a full league schedule as a Canadiens skater, most recently achieved by the aforementioned Kovalev. With three multi-point games totaling seven points (four goals, three assists), Suzuki was named as the league's second star of the week for the period ending April 6. He had a goal and an assist in the team's season-ending victory over the Carolina Hurricanes, leading the Canadiens to the Stanley Cup playoffs for the first time in four years. Finishing the regular season with 30 goals and 89 points, he earned his fourth straight Molson Cup honour, and was selected as the Canadiens' nominee for the King Clancy Memorial Trophy for the second consecutive year.

Suzuki began the 2025–26 season playing alongside Caufield and Slafkovský, but from late November the latter was moved onto the team's second line in a bid to bolster offensive depth. As a result, other players rotated onto Suzuki's wing, including Zachary Bolduc and Alexandre Texier. On January 10, Suzuki appeared in his 500th career NHL game, becoming the sixth player in league history to skate in as many consecutive games to start their career. With Slafkovský eventually returning to Suzuki and Caufield's line following the 2026 Winter Olympics hiatus, all three continued to enjoy strong offensive production. With a three-point game against the Hurricanes on March 29, Suzuki reached and then surpassed the 90-point mark, the first Canadien to do so since 1995–96. In an April 9 victory over the Lightning, Suzuki had primary assists on both Caufield's 50th goal of the season and Slafkovský's 30th, thereby reaching the 70-assist mark. For a third year in a row, he was the Canadiens' nominee for the King Clancy Memorial Trophy. Suzuki scored in the first period of an April 12 game against the New York Islanders, recording his 100th point of the season. This made him the fifth Canadien to reach that mark, and the first since Mats Näslund did so in the 1985–86 season. He ended the season with 101 points in 82 games, sixth overall in NHL scoring; this made him the first Canadien to finish in the top ten in league scoring since Näslund. In recognition of his performance, the Professional Hockey Writers' Association awarded him the Frank J. Selke Trophy, given to the best defensive forward in the NHL. He received 151 of 198 first-place votes for the trophy, and was the first Canadien to receive it since Guy Carbonneau in 1992.

In the first nine games of the 2026–27 season, Suzuki registered five goals and seven assists. He injured his hand in an October 20 game against the San Jose Sharks while blocking a shot from Sharks defender Michael Kesselring, and two days later it was announced that he would miss two to four weeks as a result, bringing his 546-game iron man streak to an end. At the time, he was second in the league in consecutive games played, behind only Brent Burns of the Colorado Avalanche. After missing six games, Suzuki returned to the lineup on November 5, contributing a goal and two assists to a 5–4 victory over the Utah Mammoth.

== International play ==
Medal record

Men's ice hockey

Representing Canada

Winter Olympics
Silver medal – second place	2026 Milano Cortina	

World U-17 Hockey Challenge
Gold medal – first place	2015 Canada	

Canada Winter Games
Gold medal – first place	2015 Prince George	

Prior to his major junior career, Suzuki was a member of Team Ontario at the 2015 Canada Winter Games, winning a gold medal. Thereafter, he was one of three members of the Owen Sound Attack invited by Hockey Canada to participate in the 2015 World U-17 Hockey Challenge. Capturing gold as part of Canada White, Suzuki recorded one goal and four points across six tournament games. The following year, he was named to Canada under-18 team for the 2016 Ivan Hlinka Memorial Tournament. Collecting one goal and three points in four games played, Canada ultimately finished the tournament in fifth place.

As a member of Canada junior team, Suzuki participated in the 2019 World Junior Championships. He provided three assists in five games, whereas his country was eliminated following a 2–1 quarterfinal loss to Finland, marking the first time in history that Canada had hosted the tournament and not reached the medal rounds.

During the 2025–26 season, Suzuki was named to Canada senior team for the 2026 Winter Olympics. Suzuki scored a goal in Canada's opening victory against Czechia in the group stage, but admitted to finding aspects of his use as a winger to be a difficult adjustment. His performance in the group stage generated criticism. In the tournament quarterfinal rematch with Czechia, he scored a crucial game-tying goal with minutes left in regulation time, allowing Canada to avoid elimination. Canada was ultimately defeated by the United States in the final, earning the silver medal.

== Personal life ==
Suzuki's younger brother Ryan also plays professional hockey. He was selected in the first round, 28th overall, by the Carolina Hurricanes in the 2019 NHL entry draft. The siblings are related to David Suzuki, a geneticist and television presenter, who is a first cousin of their grandfather.

Of Japanese Canadian heritage, Suzuki is one-quarter Japanese and is considered Gosei, as his great-great-grandparents immigrated to Canada in the early 1900s. He has expressed his desire to become a role model for younger Japanese and other Asian hockey players. He is also of Scottish Canadian descent on his mother's side.

Upon being named Canadiens captain in September 2022, several prominent politicians in Quebec, including Coalition Avenir Québec (CAQ) Premier François Legault and Parti libéral du Québec (PLQ) leader Dominique Anglade, urged Suzuki to learn French as a way to connect with the Montreal fanbase. Pittsburgh Penguins captain Sidney Crosby also privately advised him that he should do so, citing his own experience while playing in the QMJHL with the Rimouski Océanic. Suzuki told reporters that he had been taking online classes during the summer months as well as French in school growing up, but acknowledged he was better at reading the language than speaking it. In 2023, he appeared in a Pepsi commercial speaking French in which his pronunciation was praised.

During the 2016–17 OHL season, Suzuki began dating fellow Londoner Caitlin Fitzgerald after the two connected on social media while he was living in Owen Sound. On April 24, 2024, the couple announced their engagement. They eloped as part of a private ceremony held in Turks and Caicos a year later. Their daughter Maya was born on April 15, 2026.

== Career statistics ==
=== Regular season and playoffs ===
			Regular season					Playoffs
Season	Team	League	GP	G	A	Pts	PIM	GP	G	A	Pts	PIM
2014–15	London Jr. Knights	ALLIANCE	31	34	34	68	16	13	4	5	9	10
2014–15	London Nationals	GOJHL	1	0	1	0	0	—	—	—	—	—
2015–16	Owen Sound Attack	OHL	63	20	18	38	4	6	2	0	2	0
2016–17	Owen Sound Attack	OHL	65	45	51	96	10	17	8	14	22	10
2017–18	Owen Sound Attack	OHL	64	42	58	100	18	11	3	9	12	2
2017–18	Chicago Wolves	AHL	—	—	—	—	—	1	0	0	0	0
2018–19	Owen Sound Attack	OHL	30	22	23	45	4	—	—	—	—	—
2018–19	Guelph Storm	OHL	29	12	37	49	8	24	16	26	42	16
2019–20	Montreal Canadiens	NHL	71	13	28	41	6	10	4	3	7	0
2020–21	Montreal Canadiens	NHL	56	15	26	41	26	22	7	9	16	2
2021–22	Montreal Canadiens	NHL	82	21	40	61	30	—	—	—	—	—
2022–23	Montreal Canadiens	NHL	82	26	40	66	33	—	—	—	—	—
2023–24	Montreal Canadiens	NHL	82	33	44	77	36	—	—	—	—	—
2024–25	Montreal Canadiens	NHL	82	30	59	89	8	5	2	0	2	2
2025–26	Montreal Canadiens	NHL	82	29	72	101	28	19	4	12	16	6
NHL totals			537	167	309	476	167	56	17	24	41	10

=== International ===
Year	Team	Event	Result	GP	G	A	Pts	PIM
2015	Ontario	CWG	1st place, gold medalist(s)	6	3	1	4	0
2015	Canada White	U17	1st place, gold medalist(s)	6	1	3	4	2
2016	Canada	IH18	5th	4	1	2	3	0
2019	Canada	WJC	6th	5	0	3	3	4
2026	Canada	OG	2nd place, silver medalist(s)	6	2	0	2	2
Junior totals				21	5	9	14	6
Senior totals				6	2	0	2	2

== Awards and honours ==
Award	Year	Ref
ALLIANCE Hockey
Player of the Year	2015	
OHL
First All-Rookie Team	2016	
Second All-Star Team	2017	
William Hanley Trophy	2017, 2018, 2019	
J. Ross Robertson Cup champion	2019	
Third All-Star Team	2019	
Wayne Gretzky 99 Award	2019	
CHL
CHL/NHL Top Prospects Game	2017	
CHL Canada/Russia Series	2017, 2018	
Sportsman of the Year	2017	
George Parsons Trophy	2019	
NHL
All-Rookie Team	2020	
All-Star Game	2022, 2023, 2024	
Frank J. Selke Trophy	2026	
Montreal Canadiens
Molson Cup winner	2022, 2023, 2024, 2025	

Awards and achievements
Preceded by Cody Glass	Vegas Golden Knights first-round draft pick 2017	Succeeded by Erik Brännström
Preceded by Aleksander Barkov	Frank J. Selke Trophy winner 2026	Succeeded by Incumbent
Sporting positions
Preceded by Shea Weber	Montreal Canadiens captain 2022–present	Incumbent
