= Stocksunds IF =

Sports club in Stocksund, Sweden

- Full name: Stocksunds idrottsförening
- Sport: association football, arlier even bandy, floorball, ice hockey speed skating
- Founded: 3 January 1935
- Based in: Stocksund, Sweden
- Ballpark: Stocksunds IP

Stocksunds Idrottsförening, Stocksunds IF, SIF, is a Swedish sports club in Stocksund, just north of Stockholm. The club was founded on 3 January 1935 and has had sections for bandy, ice hockey, association football, figure skating, handball, and floorball. In 2017, only the football section is active. The colours of the club are yellow and black and the team logo displays the Cedergren Tower, a well-known landmark in and around Stocksund.

At present, Stocksunds IF does not compete in the elite leagues in any sport but has a broad activity for youths. Ice hockey player Tommy Albelin played for Stocksunds IF when he was in his teens.
