= Jakub Galvas =

Czech ice hockey player (born 1999)

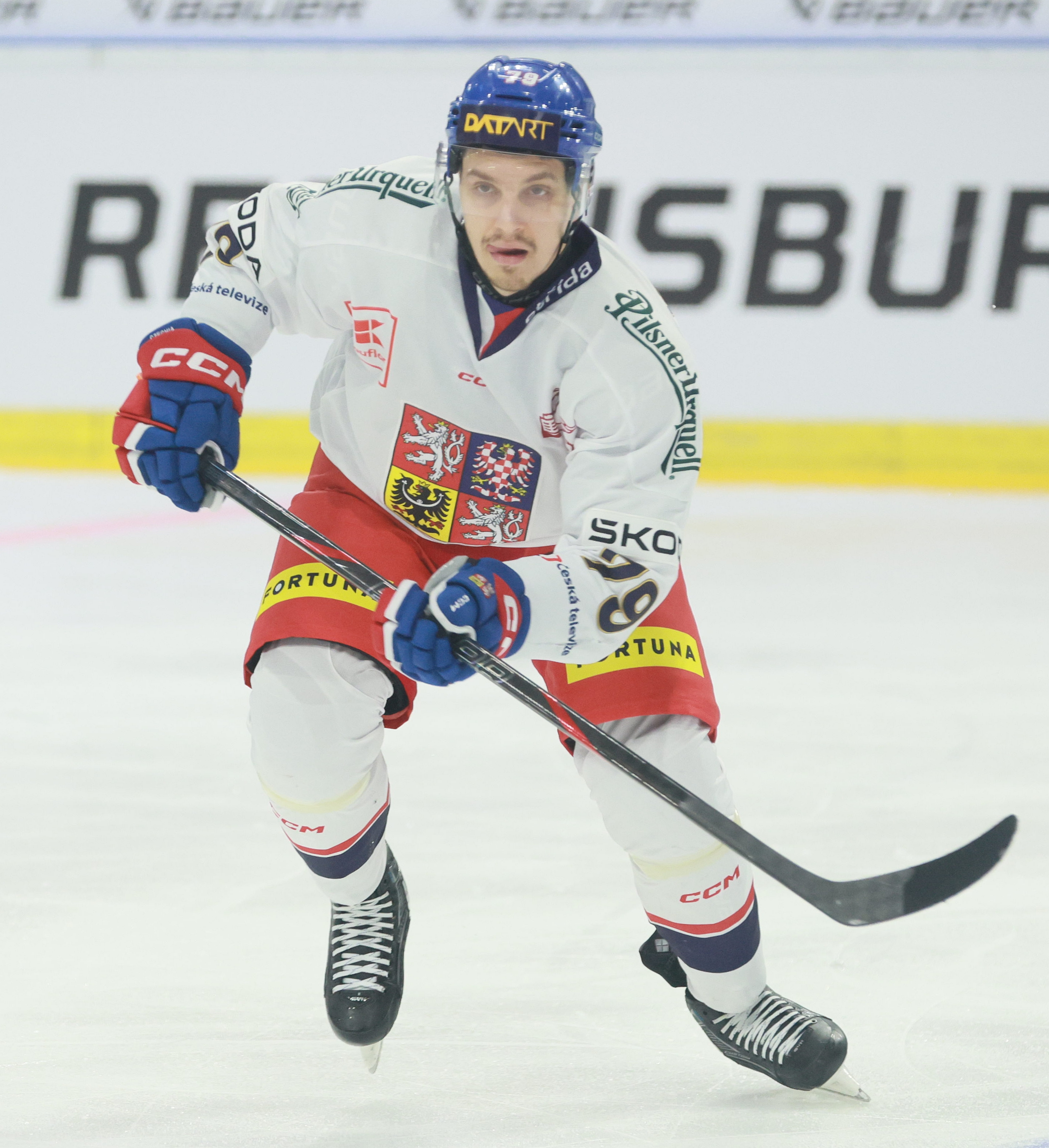
- Galvas in 2025
- Born: 15 June 1999 (age 27) Ostrava, Czech Republic
- Height: 180 cm (5 ft 11 in)
- Weight: 76 kg (168 lb; 12 st 0 lb)
- Position: Defence
- Shoots: Left
- ELH team Former teams: HC Oceláři Třinec; HC Olomouc; Jukurit; Chicago Blackhawks; Malmö Redhawks
- NHL draft: 150th overall, 2017; Chicago Blackhawks
- Playing career: 2016–present

Jakub Galvas (born 15 June 1999) is a Czech professional ice hockey defenseman who currently plays with the HC Oceláři Třinec of the Czech Extraliga (ELH). Galvas was selected 150th overall (5th round) by the Blackhawks in the 2017 NHL entry draft.

== Playing career ==
Galvas scored one goal in 36 games for HC Olomouc of the Czech Extraliga during the 2016–17 season. During that season, he played against his father Lukas Galvas, the first time father and son played a game against one another in league history.

In the following 2017–18 season, Galvas was paired defensively alongside his father who joined Olomouc as a free agent for his last professional season. He established new career highs with Olomouc, recording 2 goals and 13 points in 42 games.

While improving his offensive totals in each of his three seasons with Olomouc, Galvas left following the 2018–19 season to continue his development by agreeing to a two-year contract with Finnish Liiga club, Mikkelin Jukurit, on 15 May 2019.

After two seasons in the Liiga with Jukurit, Galvas was signed by draft club, the Chicago Blackhawks, to a two-year, entry-level contract on 7 May 2021.

During the 2021–22 season on 11 January 2022, in his NHL debut, the rookie defenseman played 23:40 against the Columbus Blue Jackets, the second-most among Blackhawks skaters, which included 1:51 on the penalty kill. He completed the season making 6 appearances with the Blackhawks.

Following two seasons within the Blackhawks organization, Galvas as a pending restricted free agent opted to return to Europe in signing a two-year contract with Swedish club, Malmö Redhawks of the Swedish Hockey League (SHL), on 9 May 2023.

Galvas played out the duration of his contract with the Redhawks before returning to his native Czech Republic as a free agent. He was signed to a three-year contract with HC Oceláři Třinec of the ELH on 15 May 2025.

== International play ==
Medal record

Representing Czech Republic

Ice hockey

Ivan Hlinka Memorial Tournament
Gold medal – first place	2016 Czech Republic/Slovakia	

Galvas was part of the winning Czech team at the 2016 Ivan Hlinka Memorial Tournament. He contributed offensively with 2 goals and 5 points in as many games.

Galvas represented the Czech Republic at the 2017 IIHF World U18 Championships and at the 2018 World Junior Ice Hockey Championships.

== Career statistics ==
=== Regular season and playoffs ===
			Regular season					Playoffs
Season	Team	League	GP	G	A	Pts	PIM	GP	G	A	Pts	PIM
2015–16	HC Olomouc	Czech.20	22	1	11	12	10	—	—	—	—	—
2016–17	HC Olomouc	Czech.20	5	1	4	5	0	—	—	—	—	—
2016–17	HC Olomouc	ELH	36	1	5	6	14	—	—	—	—	—
2016–17	HC Dukla Jihlava	Czech.1	—	—	—	—	—	1	0	1	1	0
2017–18	HC Olomouc	ELH	42	2	11	13	10	9	1	4	5	2
2018–19	HC Olomouc	ELH	40	4	13	17	12	7	1	0	1	0
2019–20	Jukurit	Jr. A	2	0	0	0	0	1	0	0	0	2
2019–20	Jukurit	Liiga	43	2	13	15	20	—	—	—	—	—
2020–21	Jukurit	Liiga	47	2	9	11	16	—	—	—	—	—
2021–22	Rockford IceHogs	AHL	59	2	18	20	14	4	0	0	0	0
2021–22	Chicago Blackhawks	NHL	6	0	0	0	0	—	—	—	—	—
2022–23	Rockford IceHogs	AHL	64	3	26	29	22	5	0	3	3	0
2023–24	Malmö Redhawks	SHL	45	3	10	13	14	—	—	—	—	—
2024–25	Malmö Redhawks	SHL	45	7	15	22	12	8	1	2	3	2
ELH totals			118	7	29	36	36	16	2	4	6	2
Liiga totals			90	4	22	26	36	—	—	—	—	—
NHL totals			6	0	0	0	0	—	—	—	—	—
SHL totals			90	10	25	35	26	8	1	2	3	2

=== International ===
Year	Team	Event	Result	GP	G	A	Pts	PIM
2015	Czech Republic	U17	7th	5	1	2	3	2
2016	Czech Republic	IH18	1st place, gold medalist(s)	5	2	3	5	2
2017	Czech Republic	U18	7th	2	0	1	1	0
2018	Czech Republic	WJC	4th	7	0	2	2	4
2019	Czech Republic	WJC	7th	5	0	1	1	2
Junior totals				24	3	9	12	10
