= Groshev GN-7 =

General information
- Type: High performance sailplane
- National origin: Soviet Union
- Designer: Groshev
- Number built: not known

History
- First flight: 1936

The Groshev GN-7 was a high performance Soviet sailplane flown in the mid-1930s and built in quantity. In 1937 it set a new world distance record.

== Design and development ==
The Groshev GN-7 was a gull-wing sailplane. Gull-wings were common in the 1930s and some designs used curved wing spars which were complicated or expensive to construct. To avoid this difficulty the inner, high dihedral parts of the GN-7's wing were unusually short (about 800 mm (31 in)) and integral with the plywood-skinned fuselage. The outer wing, at shoulder wing height and with only slight dihedral, was built around a straight single spar. The construction of the outer wing was typical for its era: a diagonal drag strut braced the spar to the fuselage and the wing was ply-skinned ahead of it. There was also ply skinning ahead of the spar, forming a torsion resistant D-box. Behind the spar and drag strut the wing was fabric covered, though the ailerons, which occupied about half the span, were ply-covered. In plan the wings were trapezoidal out to rounded tips. Strong taper produced a high aspect ratio of 22.

The GN-7's cockpit, enclosed under multi-part glazing, was ahead of the leading edge of the wing. The fuselage section became increasingly circular and slender back to a narrow, upright and integral fin. This carried a broad, rounded, fabric-covered rudder which extended down to the keel. A very narrow tailplane was forward-mounted at mid-fuselage and carried semi-elliptical, fabric-covered elevators well ahead of the rudder.

The landing gear was also conventional, with a shallow, enclosed skid from near the nose to just aft of the wing spar. The extreme rear of the fuselage flared downwards to form a small tail bumper with a little tailskid.

== Operational history ==
The GN-7 was built in quantity though numbers are not known.

During May 1937 Victor Rastorguyev set three new world distance records in one. His final and best flight covered 652 mi (1,049 km; 567 nmi).

Also in 1937 one took first place in the single-seat category of the 12th Soviet National Contest in the Crimea.

== Specifications ==
Data from j2mcl Planeurs

General characteristics

- Crew: One
- Length: 6.0 m (19 ft 8 in)
- Wingspan: 16.8 m (55 ft 1 in)
- Wing area: 12.8 m^{2} (138 sq ft)
- Aspect ratio: 22
- Airfoil: Göttingen 549
- Empty weight: 200 kg (441 lb)
- Gross weight: 305 kg (672 lb)

Performance

- Maximum glide ratio: 28
