= Anton Cup =

The Anton Cup is the championship trophy of the Swedish junior hockey league, J20 Nationell. The trophy was donated by Anton Johansson, chairman of the Swedish Ice Hockey Association between 1924 and 1948, in 1952, as an award for Sweden's top-ranking ice hockey club, decided by a national tournament without Swedish Championship status. From 1956 to 1957, the tournament gained Swedish Championship status and district teams were allowed to participate. In 1961, the tournament was limited to only associations and clubs.
