= J20 Nationell =

Junior ice hockey league in Sweden

U20 Nationell
- Sport: Ice hockey
- No. of teams: 20
- Country: Sweden
- Most recent champion: Djurgårdens IF (5th title)

U20 Nationell is a junior ice hockey league composed of 20 teams in Sweden. Previously known as the J20 Nationell and J20 SuperElit, it is the highest-level junior ice hockey league in Sweden. The teams are divided in two groups, or divisions, Norra (North) and Södra (South), and are usually associated with a professional team in either the Swedish Hockey League (SHL) or HockeyAllsvenskan in order to develop talented youth for the professional teams. The winning team of the U20 Nationell playoffs is awarded the Anton Cup.

== Game format ==
Each U20 Nationell game is an ice hockey game played between two teams and is 60 minutes long. The game is composed of three 20-minute periods. At the 60-minute mark, the team with the most goals wins the game. If a game is tied after regulation time, overtime ensues. During the regular season, overtime is a five-minute, three-on-three (three skaters, one goaltender) sudden death period, in which the first team to score a goal wins the game. In the playoffs, however, a 10-minute, five-on-five sudden death period (20 minutes in the final) is played to determine a winner. In the regular season as well as the playoffs, if both teams are tied after the overtime period, penalty shots ensues. Best team of three penalty shots wins; if both teams are still tied, sudden death penalty shots will ensue until a winning team has been determined.

== Teams ==
The U20 Nationell currently consists of 20 teams divided into two divisions, Norra (North) and Södra (South). The five best teams from each of these two divisions play in the Winter series known as Top 10, while the remaining teams from Norra and Södra have to play in a "continuation group" during winter. In the continuation group, the two worst teams have to play in a relegation-and-promotion playoff series to stay in U20 Nationell for the next season and avoid relegation to the second-tier league J20 Elit. Clubs whose senior team is in the SHL cannot be relegated. Theoretically, there is a possibility that two 'new' teams will play in U20 Nationell at the beginning of each season.

=== 2019–20 season ===
Norra
Team	City	Arena
AIK	Stockholm	Ritorps Ishall
Brynäs IF	Gävle	Gavlerinken Arena
Djurgårdens IF	Stockholm	Hovet; Stora Mossen
Leksands IF	Leksand	Tegera Arena
Luleå HF	Luleå	Coop Norrbotten Arena
Modo Hockey	Örnsköldsvik	Fjällräven Center
Mora IK	Mora	FM Mattsson Arena
Skellefteå AIK	Skellefteå	Skellefteå Kraft Arena
Timrå IK	Timrå	NHK Arena
VIK Västerås HK	Västerås	ABB Arena Nord

Södra
Team	City	Arena
Frölunda HC	Gothenburg	Frölundaborg
Färjestad BK	Karlstad	Löfbergs Arena
HV71	Jönköping	Kinnarps Arena
Karlskrona HK	Karlskrona	NKT Arena Karlskrona
Linköpings HC	Linköping	Stångebro Ishall; Saab Arena
IF Malmö Redhawks	Malmö	Malmö Isstadion
Rögle BK	Ängelholm	Lindab Arena
Södertälje SK	Södertälje	Scaniarinken
Växjö Lakers	Växjö	Vida Arena
Örebro HK	Örebro	Behrn Arena

== Season structure ==
As of the 2019–20 season.

The U20 Nationell season is divided into a regular season from mid-September through the beginning of March, where teams play each other in a predefined schedule; and the playoffs starting in March and ending in the beginning of April, which is an elimination tournament where two teams play against each other in order to advance to the next round. The final remaining team wins the Anton Cup and is crowned the Swedish Junior Champions, or Svenska juniormästare in Swedish.

In the regular season, each team may ice up to two skaters and one goaltender aged 20 or higher in each game. In the playoffs, however, no over-aged players are allowed in any game.

=== Regular season ===
In the regular season, each team plays 45 games. Points are awarded for each game, with three points awarded for a win in regulation, one point for losing in overtime/shootout, two points for winning in overtime/shootout, and zero points for a loss in regulation. Based on geographical location, the 20 teams are divided into two groups: Norra ("North") and Södra ("South"). The groups are played as round-robins, where each team plays all other teams in their group three times. After 27 games for each team, the top five teams in each group advance to a spring series called the Top 10 group. The remaining teams from each group play in a "continuation group". In both the Top 10 group and the continuation group, each team plays all other teams in their group twice.

The ten teams from the Top 10 group, and the six highest-ranked teams from the continuation group, qualify for the playoffs. The two worst-ranked teams from the continuation group have to play in a relegation-and-promotion playoff series against the two winners from the second-tier league J20 Elit in order to qualify for the next season of U20 Nationell. The playoff series are played as best-of-three series where the two teams that win two games qualify for the next season of U20 Nationell. The two U20 Nationell teams get home-ice advantage for the second game and, if necessary, the third game; the J20 Elit teams get home-ice advantage for the first game.

=== Playoffs ===
The U20 Playoffs, also known as the Anton Cup playoffs, is an elimination tournament. In the pre-qualification games as well as the quarterfinals, two teams battle to win a best-of-three series in order to advance to the next round. The semifinals, the final as well as the bronze medal game, are all played as one-game series, at a neutral venue which is the same for all these games.

The first round of the playoffs are the pre-qualifications for quarterfinals, known as the eighth finals, which consists of all teams from the Top 10 group and the six qualified teams from the continuation group. Each of the seven highest-ranked teams from the Top 10 group choose which of the teams ranked 9–16 overall (the two worst Top 10 teams and the six continuation teams) to play, with the highest-ranked team choosing first. In the second round, known as the quarterfinals, the 1st–3rd overall ranked teams of the remaining ones choose which of the teams ranked 5–8 from round one to play. In the third round, the semifinals, the top remaining seed chooses which of the two lowest remaining seeds to play. In each round, the two remaining teams are matched against each other. In the fourth round, the finals, the two remaining teams face each other. The two teams that lose in the semifinals play for the bronze medal.

In the first round and the second round, the higher-ranked team is said to be the team with home-ice advantage. Two of the three games are played at this team's home venue — the second game and, if necessary, the third game, with the first game being played at the lower-ranked team's home venue.

== Trophies and awards ==
At the end of the U20 Nationell playoffs, the Swedish Junior Champions are awarded the Anton Cup.

== See also ==
- List of Swedish ice hockey junior champions
