= Maksim Groshev =

Russian footballer and manager

Personal information
- Full name: Maksim Alekseyevich Groshev
- Date of birth: 13 June 1978 (age 48)
- Place of birth: Magdeburg, East Germany
- Height: 1.75 m (5 ft 9 in)
- Position: Midfielder

Senior career*
Years	Team	Apps	(Gls)
1996–1997	FC Nosta Novotroitsk	7	(0)
1999–2001	FC Nosta Novotroitsk	73	(6)
2002–2003	FC Gazovik Orenburg	63	(11)
2004–2006	FC Nosta Novotroitsk	66	(3)
2007–2012	FC Gazovik Orenburg	121	(4)

Managerial career
- 2012–2013: FC Gazovik-2 Orenburg (assistant)
- 2014–2016: FC Gazovik-2 Orenburg
- 2017–2018: FC Orenburg-2
- 2020–2026: FC Orenburg-2
- * Club domestic league appearances and goals

Maksim Alekseyevich Groshev (Russian: Максим Алексеевич Грошев; born 13 June 1978) is a Russian professional football manager and a former player.
