= Daniil Chayka =

Russian ice hockey player (born 2002)

- Born: 22 October 2002 (age 24) Moscow, Russia
- Height: 6 ft 3 in (191 cm)
- Weight: 185 lb (84 kg; 13 st 3 lb)
- Position: Defence
- Shoots: Left
- KHL team Former teams: Sibir Novosibirsk; CSKA Moscow; Avangard Omsk
- NHL draft: 38th overall, 2021; Vegas Golden Knights
- Playing career: 2020–present

Daniil Valentinovich Chayka (Russian: Даниил Валентинович Чайка; born 22 October 2002) is a Russian professional ice hockey defenceman who currently plays for Sibir Novosibirsk of the Kontinental Hockey League (KHL). Chayka was considered a top prospect for the 2021 NHL entry draft, and was selected 38th overall by the Vegas Golden Knights of the National Hockey League (NHL).

== Playing career ==
Chayka won the OHL Cup as a member of the U16 Toronto Jr. Canadiens. Chayka was then drafted by the Guelph Storm and won the 2019 OHL championship. Due to the COVID-19 pandemic, Chayka returned to Russia, where he won the 2020 Karjala Cup. He was a member of the Russian 2020 World Junior team.

On December 2, 2024, Chayka was placed on waivers by the Golden Knights with the intention of terminating his contract. Chayka cleared waivers the following day, subsequently becoming a free agent for the first time in his career.

On December 16, 2024, Chayka signed a two-year contract with Avangard Omsk of the Kontinental Hockey League.

== Career statistics ==
=== Regular season and playoffs ===
			Regular season					Playoffs
Season	Team	League	GP	G	A	Pts	PIM	GP	G	A	Pts	PIM
2018–19	Guelph Storm	OHL	56	5	9	14	2	20	0	0	0	0
2019–20	Guelph Storm	OHL	56	11	23	34	18	—	—	—	—	—
2020–21	CSKA Moscow	KHL	11	1	1	2	0	0	0	0	0	0
2020–21	Zvezda Moscow	VHL	10	0	1	1	0	3	0	0	0	0
2020–21	Krasnaya Armiya	MHL	5	1	3	4	2	6	0	1	1	2
2021–22	Guelph Storm	OHL	53	7	32	39	22	4	0	0	0	0
2022–23	Henderson Silver Knights	AHL	57	2	6	8	6	—	—	—	—	—
2023–24	Henderson Silver Knights	AHL	64	1	6	7	26	—	—	—	—	—
2024–25	Henderson Silver Knights	AHL	5	0	1	1	4	—	—	—	—	—
2024–25	Tahoe Knight Monsters	ECHL	4	0	1	1	2	—	—	—	—	—
2024–25	Avangard Omsk	KHL	7	0	0	0	2	9	0	1	1	2
2025–26	Avangard Omsk	KHL	6	0	0	0	0	3	0	0	0	0
2025–26	Omskie Krylia	VHL	49	1	5	6	9	7	1	1	2	0
2026–27	Avangard Omsk	KHL	7	0	0	0	0	—	—	—	—	—
KHL totals			31	1	1	2	2	12	0	1	1	2

=== International ===
Year	Team	Event	Result	GP	G	A	Pts	PIM
2021	Russia	WJC	4th	6	0	0	0	2
Junior totals				6	0	0	0	2
