= 2014 Ivan Hlinka Memorial Tournament =

Tournament details
- Host countries: Slovakia; Czech Republic
- Venues: 2 (in 2 host cities)
- Dates: August 11–16, 2014
- Teams: 8

Final positions
- Champions: Canada
- Runners-up: Czech Republic
- Third place: United States
- Fourth place: Sweden

Tournament statistics
- Games played: 18
- Scoring leader(s): (United States) Tommy Novak (5 goals, 6 assists)

Official website
- hlinkamemorial.com/eng/index.asp

The 2014 Ivan Hlinka Memorial Tournament was an under-18 international ice hockey tournament held in Břeclav, Czech Republic and Piešťany, Slovakia, from August 11 to 16, 2014. It was the 11th time this tournament has been held in those two cities.

== Preliminary round ==
All times are Central European Summer Time (UTC+2).

=== Group A ===
Pos	Team	Pld	W	OTW	OTL	L	GF	GA	GD	Pts	Qualification
1	Czech Republic (H)	3	3	0	0	0	19	7	+12	9	Semifinals
2	United States	3	2	0	0	1	18	12	+6	6	Semifinals
3	Finland	3	1	0	0	2	12	15	−3	3	Fifth place game
4	Russia	3	0	0	0	3	8	23	−15	0	Seventh place game

(H) Host

11 August 2014; 15:30	Finland	5–2 (1–2, 2–0, 2–0)	Russia	Alcaplast Arena, Břeclav; Attendance: 300

Game reference

Veini Vehviläinen
Goalies
Nikita Kolesnikov

Puljujärvi (Palmu, Saarijärvi) – 00:13	1–0
	1–1	06:34 – Rykov (Fatkullin) (PP)
	1–2	14:27 – Sidorov (Zhukenov) (PP)
Björkqvist – 27:32	2–2
Tavernier (Piipponen) – 31:11	3–2
Laine – 41:27	4–2
Aho – 51:44	5–2

14 min
Penalties
12 min
34
Shots
23

11 August 2014; 19:00	Czech Republic	4–2 (0–1, 3–0, 1–1)	United States	Alcaplast Arena, Břeclav; Attendance: 1,200

Game reference

Daniel Vladař
Goalies
Evan Sarthou

	0–1	08:42 – Boeser (Yan)
Zbořil (Weinhold, Jašek) – 24:37	1–1
Chlapík (Zbořil, Jašek) (PP) – 32:51	2–1
Jašek (Weinhold, Chlapík) (PP) – 36:09	3–1
	3–2	41:50 – Jackson
Jašek (EN) – 59:52	4–2

39
Shots
24

12 August 2014; 15:30	Russia	4–7 (3–2, 1–2, 0–3)	United States	Alcaplast Arena, Břeclav; Attendance: 415

Game reference

Nikita Kolesnikov
Goalies
Evan Sarthou

Kaprizov (Alexeyev) – 06:51	1–0
	1–1	08:50 – Yan (Novak, Young)
Ivanyuzhenkov (Alexeyev) – 09:43	2–1
Ivanyuzhenkov (Platonov) (PP) – 18:38	3–1
	3–2	19:49 – Yan
	3–3	21:27 – Boeser (Novak, Yan)
Kaprizov (Ivashov) (PP) – 33:23	4–3
	4–4	35:14 – Boeser (Gabriele, Yan) (PP)
	4–5	45:18 – Gabriele (Novak)
	4–6	52:04 – Boeser (PP)
	4–7	57:18 – Foley (Swaney, Wilkie)

28 min
Penalties
8 min
25
Shots
46

12 August 2014; 19:00	Czech Republic	4–3 (1–1, 1–1, 2–1)	Finland	Alcaplast Arena, Břeclav; Attendance: 1,060

Game reference

Daniel Vladař
Goalies
Christian Heljanko

Koblížek (Chlapík) – 00:30	1–0
	1–1	09:23 – Puljujärvi (Nättinen)
	1–2	27:38 – Palmu (Saarijärvi, Nättinen) (PP)
Zbořil (Weinhold, Jašek) (PP) – 31:25	2–2
Dufek (Suchý) – 41:37	3–2
	3–3	46:58 – Palmu (Puljujärvi) (PP)
Jašek (Zbořil, Chlapík) (PP) – 47:30	4–3

16 min
Penalties
40 min
17
Shots
37

13 August 2014; 15:30	United States	9–4 (1–1, 3–2, 5–1)	Finland	Alcaplast Arena, Břeclav; Attendance: 372

Game reference

Evan Sarthou
Goalies
Veini Vehviläinen

	0–1	05:16 – Tammela (Aho)
Novak (Young, Gabriele) (PP) – 16:55	1–1
	1–2	20:49 – Palmu
Terry (Novak, Jackson) – 22:32	2–2
Bachman (SH) – 33:45	3–2
	3–3	35:15 – Saarijärvi (Palmu) (PP)
Jackson (Boeser) (PP) – 36:25	4–3
Novak – 42:19	5–3
	5–4	44:30 – Aho (Vainio) (PP)
Yan (Bachman) – 53:39	6–4
Terry (Jackson, Gabriele) – 54:54	7–4
Boeser (Foley) – 56:47	8–4
Terry (Novak) – 57:54	9–4

26 min
Penalties
12 min
44
Shots
31

13 August 2014; 19:00	Czech Republic	11–2 (2–1, 5–0, 4–1)	Russia	Alcaplast Arena, Břeclav; Attendance: 1.548

Game reference

Aleš Stezka
Goalies
Anton Krasotkin

Dvořák (Stránský) – 05:54	1–0
	1–1	08:33 – Kaprizov (Rykov)
Dymáček (Kalina, Šoustal) – 12:23	2–1
Suchý (Krenželok) – 23:49	3–1
Dufek (Kaše, Weinhold) (PP) – 32:29	4–1
Dymáček (Šoustal) – 32:26	5–1
Stránský (Doudera) – 33:25	6–1
Stránský – 39:10	7–1
Kaše (Suchý, Stezka) – 45:33	8–1
	8–2	46:34 – Zhukenov (Kaprizov)
Dvořák (Hájek) – 49:33	9–2
Zbořil (Weinhold) (PP) – 54:36	10–2
Zbořil (Weinhold, Chlapík) (PP) – 57:39	11–2

6 min
Penalties
34 min
40
Shots
27

=== Group B ===
Pos	Team	Pld	W	OTW	OTL	L	GF	GA	GD	Pts	Qualification
1	Canada	3	3	0	0	0	15	3	+12	9	Semifinals
2	Sweden	3	2	0	0	1	14	8	+6	6	Semifinals
3	Switzerland	3	1	0	0	2	6	13	−7	3	Fifth place game
4	Slovakia (H)	3	0	0	0	3	3	14	−11	0	Seventh place game

(H) Host

11 August 2014; 14:00	Switzerland	1–5 (0–2, 1–2, 0–1)	Canada	Easton Arena, Piešťany; Attendance: 251

Game reference

Joren van Pottelberghe
Goalies
Zach Sawchenko

	0–1	07:56 – Strome (Knott, Marner)
	0–2	10:12 – Barzal (Soy)
	0–3	24:06 – Crouse (Roy)
	0–4	29:24 – Vande Sompel (Barzal, Konecny)
Schmid (Thürkauf, Weber) – 30:24	1–4
	1–5	42:21 – Stephens (Merkley)

15 min
Penalties
18 min
21
Shots
36

11 August 2014; 17:30	Slovakia	1–6 (1–1, 0–3, 0–2)	Sweden	Easton Arena, Piešťany; Attendance: 589

Game reference

Vladimir Cibulka
Goalies
Felix Sandström

	0–1	10:44 – Younan (Carlsson, Lööke)
Hecl (Zelenák, Žiak) – 16:45	1–1
	1–2	20:34 – Asplund (Kylington)
	1–3	25:41 – Eriksson Ek (Grundström)
	1–4	39:47 – Kylington (Ahl)
	1–5	47:34 – Davidsson (PP)
	1–6	51:08 – Eriksson Ek (Larsson)

12 min
Penalties
7 min
19
Shots
38

12 August 2014; 14:00	Canada	5–1 (0–0, 2–1, 3–0)	Sweden	Easton Arena, Piešťany; Attendance: 212

Game reference

Zach Sawchenko
Goalies
Felix Sandström

Konecny (Barzal, Vande Sompel) – 26:36	1–0
Crouse (Roy, Merkley) – 34:30	2–0
	2–1	36:34 – Magnusson (Younan)
Stephens (Soy) – 43:21	3–1
Stephens (Musil, Soy) – 52:09	4–1
Harkins – 56:46	5–1

18 min
Penalties
15 min
41
Shots
28

12 August 2014; 17:30	Slovakia	1–3 (0–1, 0–2, 1–0)	Switzerland	Easton Arena, Piešťany; Attendance: 267

Game reference

Adam Húska
Goalies
Tim Guggisberg

	0–1	18:08 – Schmid (Haberstich) (PP)
	0–2	25:26 – Roberts (Marchon)
	0–3	28:15 – Karrer (Diem, Riat) (PP)
Valent (Struška, Trudman) – 43:07	1–3

16 min
Penalties
2 min
20
Shots
25

13 August 2014; 14:00	Sweden	7–2 (4–1, 3–1, 0–0)	Switzerland	Easton Arena, Piešťany; Attendance: 285

Game reference

Adam Werner
Goalies
Joren van Pottelberghe

Dahlén (Lööke, Carlsson) – 01:04	1–0
	1–1	04:20 – Hollenstein (Frick)
Davidsson (Magnusson, Grundström) – 09:23	2–1
Erixon (Kalte, Younan) – 10:17	3–1
Dahlén (Lööke) – 12:24	4–1
Kalte (Emanuelsson, Dahlström) – 23:49	5–1
	5–2	25:42 – Riat (Holdener, Haberstich) (PP)
Eriksson Ek (Grundström, Ahl) – 27:44	6–2
Carlsson (Kalte, Leman) – 34:20	7–2

18 min
Penalties
8 min
42
Shots
19

13 August 2014; 17:30	Slovakia	1–5 (0–2, 0–1, 1–2)	Canada	Easton Arena, Piešťany; Attendance: 586

Game reference

Adam Húska
Goalies
Callum Booth

	0–1	05:20 – Bear (Harkins)
	0–2	16:24 – Crouse (Roy)
	0–3	21:15 – Marner (Knott, Strome)
	0–4	44:40 – Konecny (Harkins, Brisebois)
	0–5	45:50 – Soy (Musil)
Lešťan (Hatala) (PP) – 52:19	1–5

15 min
Penalties
21 min
1
Shots
5

== Final round ==
=== Bracket ===
Semifinals
15 August
A1 Czech Republic	4
B2 Sweden	3
15 August
B1 Canada	11
A2 United States	5

Final
16 August
W1 Czech Republic	2
W2 Canada	6
Third place game
16 August
L1 Sweden	4
L2 United States	5

=== Seventh place game ===
15 August 2014	Slovakia	2–5 (1–2, 1–1, 0–2)	Russia	Easton Arena, Piešťany; Attendance: 287

Game reference

Adam Húska
Goalies
Anton Krasotkin

	0–1	04:48 – Kaprizov (Yemets, Bannikov)
Bondra (Horváth) – 11:25	1–1
	1–2	18:38 – Yemets (Karnaukhov, Zhukenov)
	1–3	27:52 – Kaprizov (Zhukenov)
Roman (Hecl) – 29:46	2–3
	2–4	48:53 – Ivanyuzhenkov (Byakin, Bochkarev)
	2–5	52:48 – Byakin (Bochkarev, Karnaukhov)

15 min
Penalties
18 min
20
Shots
41

=== Fifth place game ===
15 August 2014	Finland	9–3 (4–0, 5–2, 0–1)	Switzerland	Alcaplast Arena, Břeclav; Attendance: 230

Game reference

Christian Heljanko
Goalies
Tim Guggisberg
Joren van Pottelberghe

Puljujärvi (Palmu, Nättinen) (PP) – 02:40	1–0
Ruotsalainen (Aho, Vainio) (PP) – 04:26	2–0
Palmu (Nättinen, Juolevi) – 04:50	3–0
Aho (Ruotsalainen) (PP) – 14:03	4–0
Nättinen (Palmu) (PP) – 23:54	5–0
	5–1	26:16 – Diem (Riat) (PP)
	5–2	30:25 – Marchon (Roberts, Impose) (PP)
Aho (Puljujärvi) – 32:06	6–2
Björkqvist (Saarijärvi, Mattila) (PP) – 35:23	7–2
Mattila (Välimäki) – 35:56	8–2
Aho (Nättinen) – 39:01	9–2
	9–3	54:22 – Diem (Roberts, Weber) (PP)

19 min
Penalties

31
Shots
18

=== Semifinals ===
15 August 2014	Canada	11–5 (3–1, 5–2, 3–2)	United States	Easton Arena, Piešťany; Attendance: 240

Game reference

Zach Sawchenko
Goalies
Evan Sarthou, Matt Jurusik

Strome (Marner, Knott) – 00:50	1–0
	1–1	03:25 – Novak (Young, Gabriele)
Strome (Marner, Knott) – 14:33	2–1
Harkins (Stephens, Brisebois) (SH) – 17:55	3–1
	3–2	24:40 – Boeser (Yan, Novak)
Soy (Konecny, Roy) – 28:15	4–2
Strome (Meloche, Hobbs) (PP) – 29:58	5–2
	5–3	31:00 – Laczynski (Terry, Dello) (PP)
Konecny (Harkins, Bear) – 32:16	6–3
Konecny (Harkins, Barzal) – 35:20	7–3
Crouse – 39:25	8–3
Musil (Hobbs, Stephens) – 42:04	9–3
Stephens (Soy) – 50:53	10–3
	10–4	51:24 – Bachman (Swaney)
	10–5	56:09 – Novak (Gabriele, Boeser) (PP)
Soy (Roy, Merkley) – 59:17	11–5

10 min
Penalties
4 min
48
Shots
29

15 August 2014	Czech Republic	4–3 (1–0, 3–3, 0–0)	Sweden	Alcaplast Arena, Břeclav; Attendance: 2,967

Game reference

Daniel Vladař
Goalies
Felix Sandström

Dufek (Kaše) (PP) – 09:48	1–0
Krenželok (Weinhold) (PP) – 22:46	2–0
	2–1	24:11 – Carlsson (Dahlén) (PP)
	2–2	27:42 – Erixon
Dymáček (Gago) – 33:34	3–2
Anděl (Šoustal) – 35:26	4–2
	4–3	37:51 – Dahlén (Ölund)

2 min
Penalties
6 min
34
Shots
36

=== Bronze medal game ===
16 August 2014	United States	5–4 OT (3–2, 0–0, 1–2, 1–0)	Sweden	Easton Arena, Piešťany; Attendance: 295

Game reference

Matt Jurusik
Goalies
Adam Werner

	0–1	03:43 – Erixon (Kylington, Dahlström)
	0–2	10:14 – Dahlén (Lööke) (PP)
Novak – 10:50	1–2
Foley (Laczynski, Filipe) – 14:07	2–2
Terry (Jackson, Wilkie) (PP) – 16:29	3–2
Bachman (SH) – 43:20	4–2
	4–3	50:07 – Ölund (Younan) (PP)
	4–4	58:30 – Asplund (Eriksson Ek, Davidsson)

12 min
Penalties
6 min
33
Shots
46

=== Gold medal game ===
16 August 2014; 17:00	Czech Republic	2–6 (0–4, 2–1, 0–1)	Canada	Alcaplast Arena, Břeclav; Attendance: 3,000

Game reference

Daniel Vladař
Goalies
Zach Sawchenko

	0–1	03:34 – Strome (Marner)
	0–2	09:06 – Crouse (N. Roy, J. Roy)
	0–3	13:09 – Marner (Spencer)
	0–4	16:51 – Konecny (J. Roy, Barzal) (PP?)
Koblížek (Krenželok) (PP) – 23:26	1–4
	1–5	29:29 – N. Roy (Spencer)
Jašek (Doudera) – 38:48	2–5
	2–6	51:38 – Crouse (Marner)

12 min
Penalties
14 min
24
Shots
22

=== Final standings ===
Rank	Team
1st place, gold medalist(s)	Canada
2nd place, silver medalist(s)	Czech Republic
3rd place, bronze medalist(s)	United States
4	Sweden
5	Finland
6	Switzerland
7	Russia
8	Slovakia

== See also ==
- 2014 IIHF World U18 Championships
- 2014 World Junior Championships
