= 2016 World U-17 Hockey Challenge =

Tournament details
- Host country: Canada
- Venue(s): Essar Centre, John Rhodes Community Centre (in Sault Ste. Marie 1 host cities)
- Dates: October 30 – November 5
- Teams: 8

The 2016 World Under-17 Hockey Challenge was an ice hockey tournament held in Sault Ste. Marie, Ontario, Canada, between October 30 and November 5, 2016. The World Under-17 Hockey Challenge is held by Hockey Canada annually to showcase young hockey talent from across Canada and other strong hockey countries. The primary venues used for the tournament are the Essar Centre and the John Rhodes Community Centre.

== Challenge results ==
=== Preliminary round ===
==== Group A ====
Team	Pld	W	OTW	OTL	L	GF	GA	GD	Pts
Canada Black	3	2	0	0	1	10	11	−1	6
United States	3	1	1	0	1	9	8	+1	5
Czech Republic	3	1	0	1	1	14	10	+4	4
Canada White	3	1	0	0	2	8	12	−4	3

===== Results =====
October 30, 2016	Canada Black	1 – 4	Canada White	Essar Centre, Sault Ste. Marie

October 30, 2016	United States	3 – 2 OT	Czech Republic	Emera Centre Northside, North Sydney, Nova Scotia

October 31, 2016	Czech Republic	4 – 5	Canada Black	Essar Centre, Sault Ste. Marie

October 31, 2016	Canada White	2 – 3	United States	Emera Centre Northside, North Sydney, Nova Scotia

November 1, 2016	Czech Republic	8 – 2	Canada White	Essar Centre, Sault Ste. Marie

November 1, 2016	United States	3 – 4	Canada Black	Emera Centre Northside, North Sydney, Nova Scotia

==== Group B ====
Team	Pld	W	OTW	OTL	L	GF	GA	GD	Pts
Canada Red	3	2	0	0	1	7	6	+1	6
Russia	3	1	1	0	1	6	4	+2	5
Sweden	3	1	0	1	1	10	10	0	4
Finland	3	1	0	0	2	5	8	−3	3

===== Results =====
October 30, 2016	Canada Red	2 – 3	Finland	Essar Centre, Sault Ste. Marie

October 30, 2016	Russia	4 – 3 OT	Sweden	John Rhodes Community Centre, Sault Ste. Marie

October 31, 2016	Finland	0 – 2	Russia	John Rhodes Community Centre, Sault Ste. Marie

October 31, 2016	Sweden	3 – 4	Canada Red	Essar Centre, Sault Ste. Marie

November 1, 2016	Russia	0 – 1	Canada Red	Essar Centre, Sault Ste. Marie

November 1, 2016	Sweden	4 – 2	Finland	John Rhodes Community Centre, Sault Ste. Marie

=== Play Offs ===
Quarterfinals
3 November
Canada Black	3
Finland	1
3 November
Russia	3
Czech Republic	1
3 November
Canada Red	2
Canada White	3
3 November
United States	3
Sweden	4

Semifinals
4 November
Canada Black	3 SO
Russia	2
4 November
Canada White	2
Sweden	3 SO

Final
5 November
Canada Black	1
Sweden	2
Third place
5 November
Russia	6
Canada White	1

== Final standings ==
	Team
1st place, gold medalist(s)	Sweden
2nd place, silver medalist(s)	Canada Black
3rd place, bronze medalist(s)	Russia
4	Canada White
5	United States
6	Canada Red
7	Finland
8	Czech Republic
