= Guillaume Brisebois =

Canadian ice hockey player (born 1997)

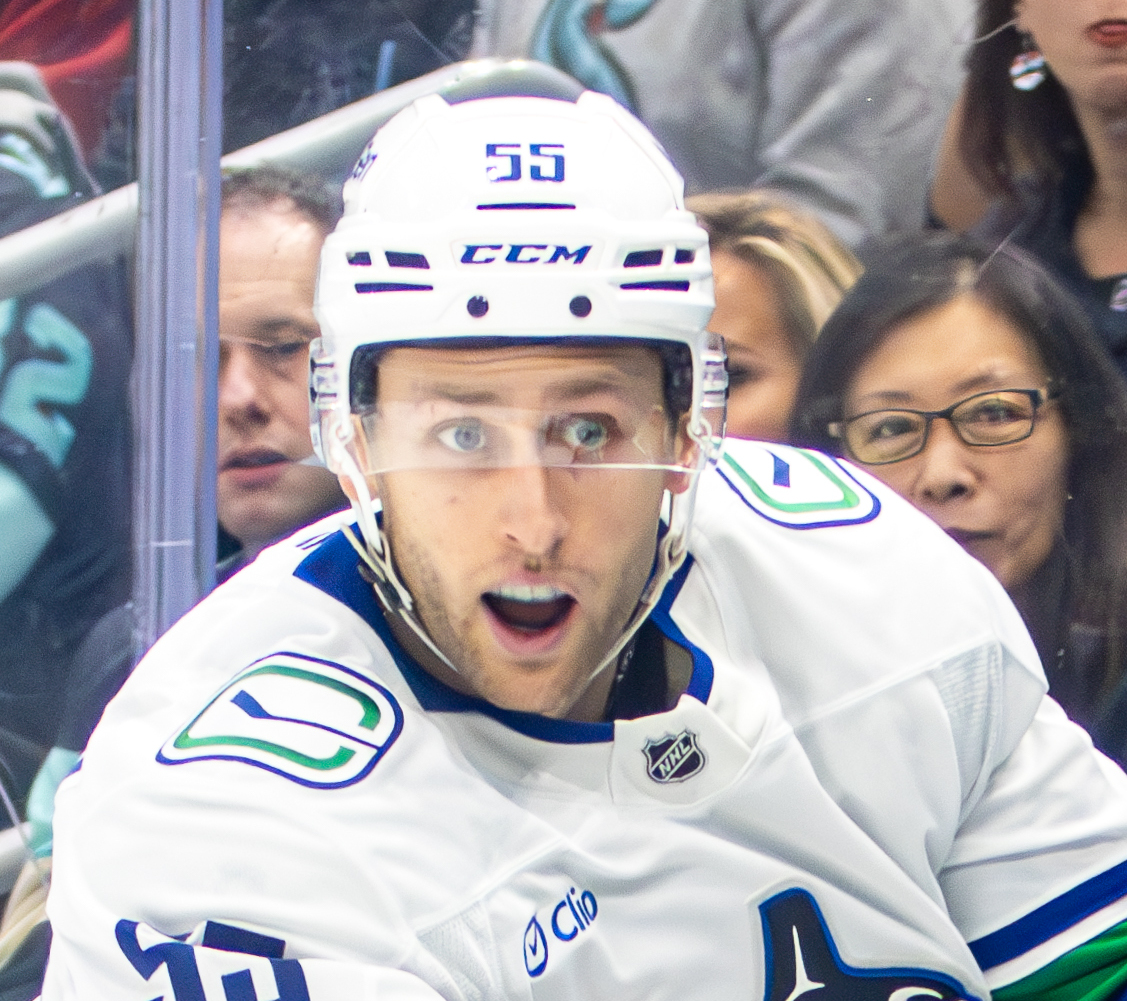
- Brisebois with the Vancouver Canucks in 2025
- Born: July 21, 1997 (age 29) Longueuil, Quebec, Canada
- Height: 6 ft 2 in (188 cm)
- Weight: 175 lb (79 kg; 12 st 7 lb)
- Position: Defence
- Shoots: Left
- NHL team: Vancouver Canucks
- NHL draft: 66th overall, 2015; Vancouver Canucks
- Playing career: 2017–present

Guillaume Brisebois (born July 21, 1997) is a Canadian professional ice hockey defenceman for the Vancouver Canucks of the National Hockey League (NHL).

== Playing career ==
=== Junior ===
Brisebois was selected by the Acadie–Bathurst Titan in the first round (5th overall) in the 2013 Quebec Major Junior Hockey League (QMJHL) draft. Though the team placed last in 2015, he earned praise for his defensive play. After playing for three years, he requested a trade and was subsequently dealt during the 2016 QMJHL draft to the Charlottetown Islanders, along with defenceman Jake Barter, in exchange for Luc Deschenes, a second-round pick in 2017 and a first-round pick in 2018.

Two months after arriving in Charlottetown, his teammates voted him captain. Brisebois recorded his first goal as an Islander in his first game on October 2, 2016.

=== Professional ===
The Vancouver Canucks drafted Brisebois 66th overall in the 2015 NHL entry draft after acquiring the pick from the Carolina Hurricanes in exchange for goaltender Eddie Läck. In December 2015, he signed a three-year, entry-level contract with the Canucks. Beginning in 2017, Brisebois regularly played for the Canucks American Hockey League (AHL) affiliate, the Utica Comets, and later for the Abbotsford Canucks.

On February 14, 2019, Brisebois made his NHL debut with the Canucks in a 4–3 shootout win against the Los Angeles Kings.

On October 30, 2020, Brisebois re-signed with Vancouver to a one-year, $700,000 contract. In March 2023, after appearing in nine games with the team, Brisebois signed a two-year extension with the Canucks.

On June 23, 2025, Brisebois won the Calder Cup as a member of the Abbotsford Canucks.

On June 30, 2026, Brisebois signed a one-year, two-way contract worth $900,000 with the Vancouver Canucks.

== Personal life ==
He is the younger brother of Mathieu Brisebois, who plays defence for the Saint-Hyacinthe Bataillon in the Ligue Nord-Américaine de Hockey.

== Career statistics ==
=== Regular season and playoffs ===
			Regular season					Playoffs
Season	Team	League	GP	G	A	Pts	PIM	GP	G	A	Pts	PIM
2013–14	Acadie–Bathurst Titan	QMJHL	60	3	16	19	26	4	1	2	3	2
2014–15	Acadie–Bathurst Titan	QMJHL	63	4	24	28	34	0	0	0	0	0
2015–16	Acadie–Bathurst Titan	QMJHL	52	10	16	26	28	5	0	2	2	2
2016–17	Charlottetown Islanders	QMJHL	61	10	37	47	34	13	0	4	4	10
2017–18	Utica Comets	AHL	68	3	15	18	16	5	0	0	0	2
2018–19	Utica Comets	AHL	49	3	8	11	22	—	—	—	—	—
2018–19	Vancouver Canucks	NHL	8	0	0	0	0	—	—	—	—	—
2019–20	Utica Comets	AHL	48	4	11	15	37	—	—	—	—	—
2020–21	Laval Rocket	AHL	9	1	1	2	2	—	—	—	—	—
2020–21	Vancouver Canucks	NHL	1	0	0	0	0	—	—	—	—	—
2020–21	Utica Comets	AHL	5	0	1	1	0	—	—	—	—	—
2021–22	Abbotsford Canucks	AHL	26	2	5	7	18	2	0	1	1	0
2021–22	Vancouver Canucks	NHL	1	0	0	0	0	—	—	—	—	—
2022–23	Abbotsford Canucks	AHL	36	1	5	6	11	—	—	—	—	—
2022–23	Vancouver Canucks	NHL	17	1	2	3	6	—	—	—	—	—
2023–24	Abbotsford Canucks	AHL	8	0	0	0	0	—	—	—	—	—
2024–25	Abbotsford Canucks	AHL	48	2	3	5	19	24	2	1	3	2
2024–25	Vancouver Canucks	NHL	3	0	0	0	0	—	—	—	—	—
2025–26	Abbotsford Canucks	AHL	9	1	1	2	2	—	—	—	—	—
NHL totals			30	1	2	3	6	—	—	—	—	—

=== International ===
Year	Team	Event	Result	GP	G	A	Pts	PIM
2014	Canada Quebec	U17	4th	6	0	0	0	0
2014	Canada	IH18	1st place, gold medalist(s)	5	0	3	3	4
2015	Canada	U18	3rd place, bronze medalist(s)	7	1	0	1	2
Junior totals				18	1	3	4	6

== Awards and honours ==
Award	Year	Ref
AHL
Calder Cup Champion	2025	
