= Jérémy Roy =

Jeremy Roy may refer to:

- Jérémy Roy (cyclist) (born 1983), French road bicycle racer
- Jérémy Roy (ice hockey) (born 1997), Canadian ice hockey defenceman
