= 2014 World U-17 Hockey Challenge =

2014 World U-17 Hockey Challenge may refer to:

- 2014 World U-17 Hockey Challenge (January)
- 2014 World U-17 Hockey Challenge (November)
