= Daniel Vladař =

Czech ice hockey player (born 1997)

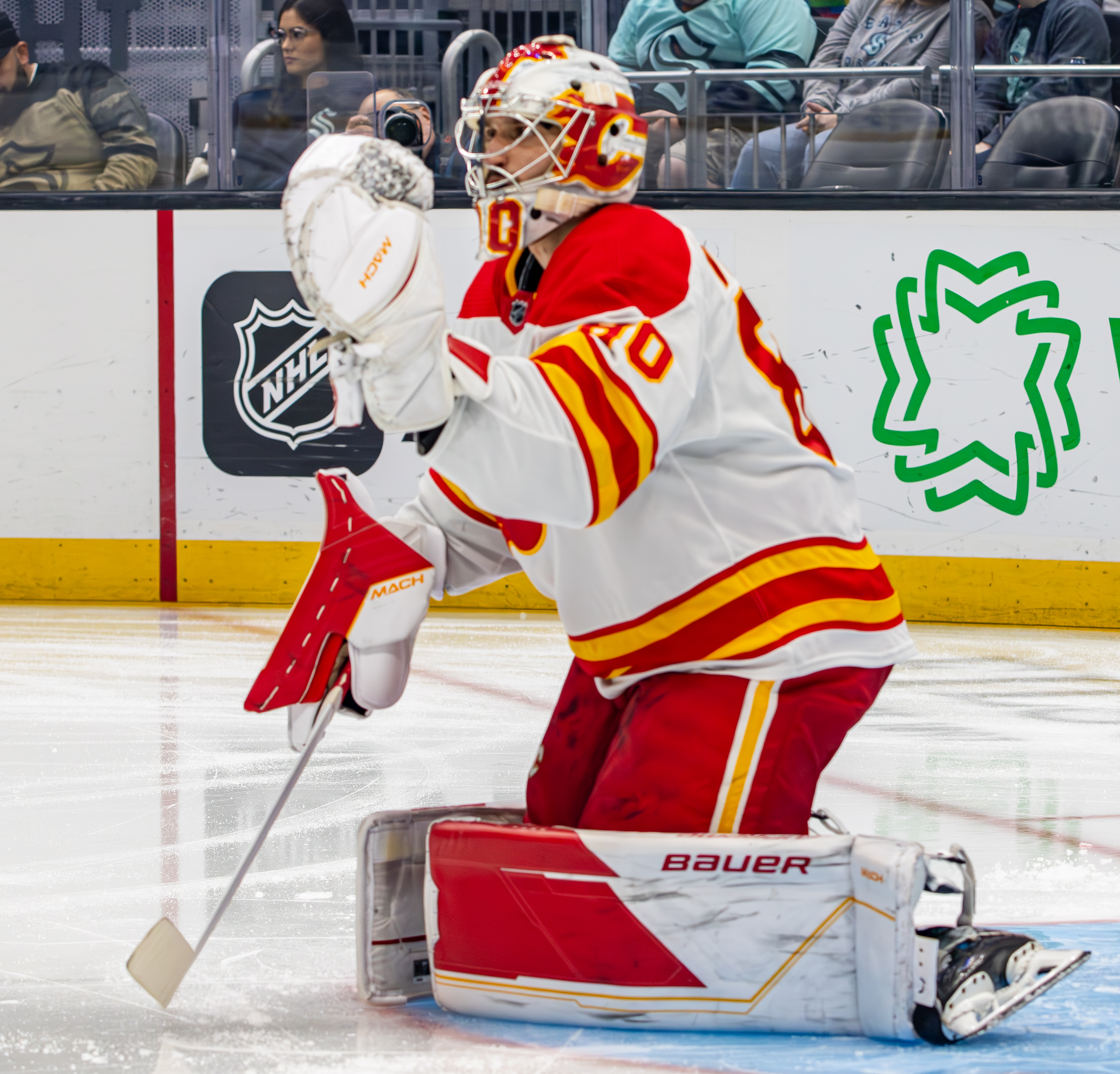
- Vladař with the Calgary Flames in 2023
- Born: 20 August 1997 (age 29) Prague, Czech Republic
- Height: 6 ft 5 in (196 cm)
- Weight: 209 lb (95 kg; 14 st 13 lb)
- Position: Goaltender
- Catches: Left
- NHL team Former teams: Philadelphia Flyers; Boston Bruins; Dynamo Pardubice; Calgary Flames
- National team: Czech Republic
- NHL draft: 75th overall, 2015; Boston Bruins
- Playing career: 2015–present

Daniel Vladař (/ˈvlæ.dʌ/ VLA-duhr; born 20 August 1997) is a Czech professional ice hockey player who is a goaltender for the Philadelphia Flyers of the National Hockey League (NHL). Selected by the Boston Bruins in the 2015 NHL entry draft, Vladař played several years in his native Czech Republic before moving to North America in 2015. After four seasons in the minor leagues he made his NHL debut with the Bruins during the 2020 Stanley Cup playoffs.

== Playing career ==
Vladař played in the Czech Republic, and made his debut in the 1st Czech Republic Hockey League, the second highest league, during the 2014–15 season. He was selected 75th overall by the Boston Bruins in the 2015 NHL entry draft, and moved to North America to join the Chicago Steel of the United States Hockey League for the 2015–16 season. He joined the Bruins' American Hockey League affiliate, the Providence Bruins for the 2016–17 season, and split the next four seasons between Providence and the Bruins' ECHL affiliate the Atlanta Gladiators. Two concussions limited his first pro season, and prior to the 2017–18 season Vladař broke both his wrists, which delayed his start.

After the pause during the 2019–20 season, due to the COVID-19 pandemic, Vladař was included in the Bruins Return to Play roster and remained on the team as the club's third choice goaltender for the postseason. During the 2020 Stanley Cup playoffs, Vladař was elevated to the backup goaltender role after the withdrawal of starting goaltender Tuukka Rask. On 24 August 2020, he was signed to a three-year contract extension by the Bruins, with the final season of his new deal to be a one-way contract. Vladař made his NHL debut on 26 August, against the Tampa Bay Lightning in relief of starting goaltender Jaroslav Halák.

To start the 2020–21 season Vladař was loaned to Dynamo Pardubice of the Czech Extraliga (ELH). He played six games there before returning to the Bruins' pre-season camp. Vladař's first NHL start, and first regular season game, came on 16 March 2021, against the Pittsburgh Penguins. He made 34 saves as Boston won the game 2–1.

On 28 July 2021, Vladař was traded by the Bruins to the Calgary Flames in exchange for a 2022 third-round draft pick.

After four seasons with the Flames, Vladař left as a free agent and was signed to a two-year, $6.7 million contract with the Philadelphia Flyers on 1 July 2025.

On 1 July 2026, Vladař signed a five-year, $27.5 million extension with the Flyers.

== International play ==
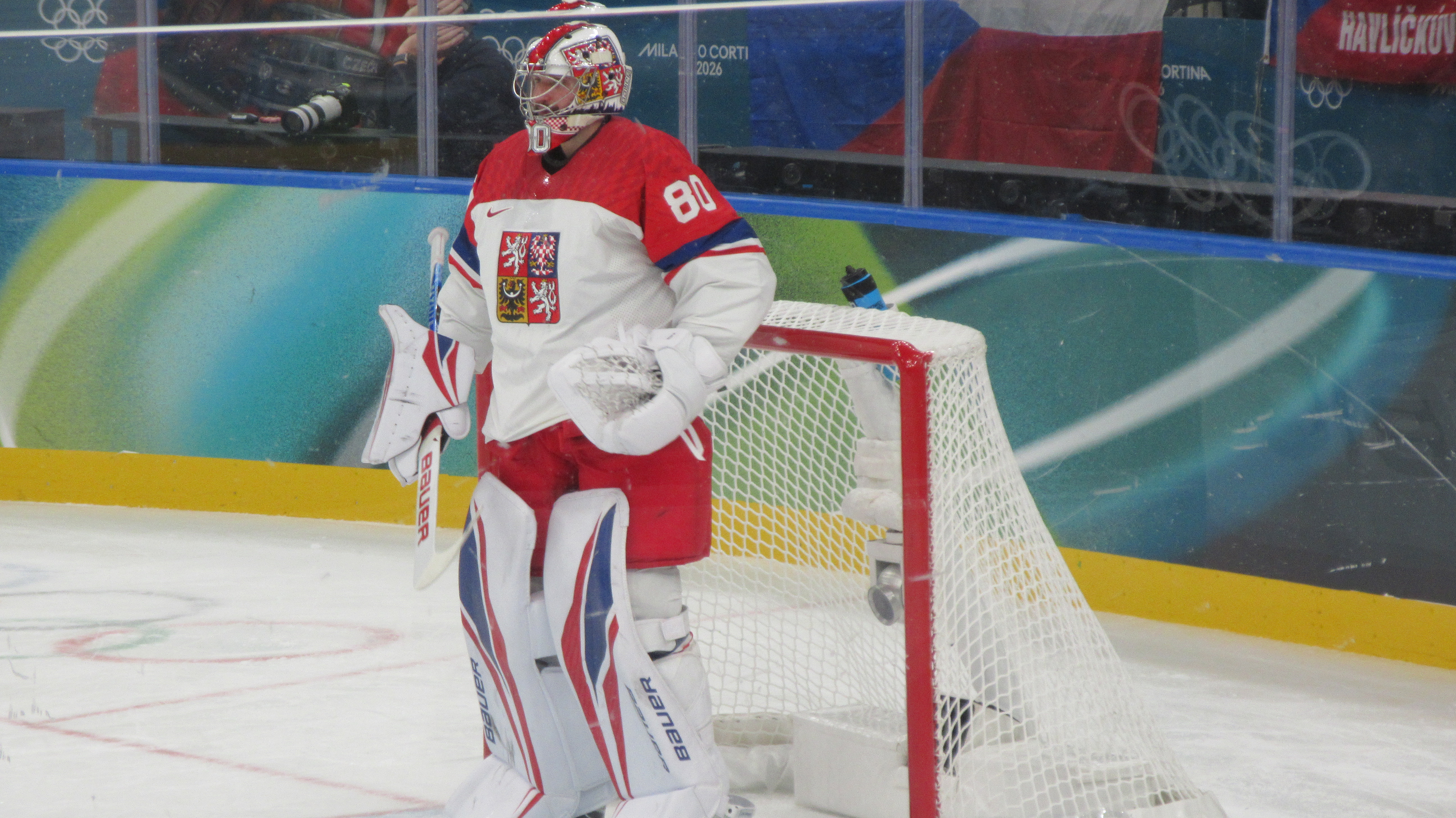
- Vladař with Czechia in 2026

Medal record

Representing Czech Republic

Ice hockey

IIHF U18 Championships
Silver medal – second place	2014 Finland	

Ivan Hlinka Memorial Tournament
Silver medal – second place	2014 Czech Republic/Slovakia	

Vladař has won two medals representing Czech Republic. He won silver at the IIHF World U18 Championships in 2014 as the backup goalie and then won another silver medal at the 2014 Ivan Hlinka Memorial Tournament. In the latter he once again played as the backup, only playing 16:51 in his sole game.

Dan Vladař represented Czechia at the 2026 Winter Olympics in Milano Cortina. He served as one of the team's goaltenders and saw action in a preliminary round matchup against France, where he earned a victory.

== Career statistics ==
=== Regular season and playoffs ===
			Regular season									Playoffs
Season	Team	League	GP	W	L	OTL	MIN	GA	SO	GAA	SV%	GP	W	L	MIN	GA	SO	GAA	SV%
2012–13	Rytíři Kladno	Czech.20	1	1	0	0	60	3	0	3.00	.893	—	—	—	—	—	—	—	—
2013–14	Rytíři Kladno	Czech.20	6	3	3	0	366	15	1	2.46	.906	—	—	—	—	—	—	—	—
2014–15	Rytíři Kladno	Czech.20	29	16	13	0	1,681	78	1	2.78	.926	4	1	3	200	12	0	3.60	.893
2014–15	Rytíři Kladno	Czech.1	8	4	4	0	487	16	1	1.97	.933	—	—	—	—	—	—	—	—
2015–16	Chicago Steel	USHL	30	12	12	4	1,766	68	3	2.31	.920	—	—	—	—	—	—	—	—
2016–17	Atlanta Gladiators	ECHL	18	5	9	2	972	63	0	3.89	.887	—	—	—	—	—	—	—	—
2016–17	Providence Bruins	AHL	8	4	0	2	390	17	1	2.62	.921	—	—	—	—	—	—	—	—
2017–18	Atlanta Gladiators	ECHL	41	17	18	2	2,309	114	0	2.96	.911	3	0	3	175	9	0	3.10	.917
2017–18	Providence Bruins	AHL	4	2	2	0	242	9	0	2.23	.924	—	—	—	—	—	—	—	—
2018–19	Providence Bruins	AHL	31	13	13	4	1,847	84	2	2.73	.898	1	1	0	60	2	0	2.00	.926
2019–20	Providence Bruins	AHL	25	14	7	1	1,407	42	3	1.79	.936	—	—	—	—	—	—	—	—
2019–20	Atlanta Gladiators	ECHL	1	1	0	0	60	2	0	2.00	.909	—	—	—	—	—	—	—	—
2019–20	Boston Bruins	NHL	—	—	—	—	—	—	—	—	—	1	0	0	29	3	0	6.21	.800
2020–21	HC Dynamo Pardubice	ELH	6	4	2	0	373	8	1	1.29	.956	—	—	—	—	—	—	—	—
2020–21	Providence Bruins	AHL	10	3	4	3	602	22	1	2.19	.923	—	—	—	—	—	—	—	—
2020–21	Boston Bruins	NHL	5	2	2	1	301	17	0	3.40	.886	—	—	—	—	—	—	—	—
2021–22	Calgary Flames	NHL	23	13	6	2	1,244	57	2	2.75	.906	1	0	0	20	0	0	0.00	1.000
2022–23	Calgary Flames	NHL	27	14	6	5	1,484	72	0	2.91	.895	—	—	—	—	—	—	—	—
2023–24	Calgary Flames	NHL	20	8	9	2	1,128	68	0	3.62	.882	—	—	—	—	—	—	—	—
2024–25	Calgary Flames	NHL	30	12	11	6	1,781	83	2	2.80	.898	—	—	—	—	—	—	—	—
2025–26	Philadelphia Flyers	NHL	52	29	14	7	2,995	121	0	2.42	.906	10	4	6	633	23	2	2.18	.922
NHL totals			157	78	48	23	8,932	418	4	2.81	.898	12	4	6	682	26	2	2.29	.918

=== International ===
Year	Team	Event	GP	W	L	T	MIN	GA	SO	GAA	SV%
2014	Czech Republic	U17	3	1	2	0	177	9	0	3.05	.920
2014	Czech Republic	IH18	1	0	1	0	17	4	0	4.00	.500
2015	Czech Republic	U18	4	2	1	0	195	11	1	3.38	.903
2017	Czech Republic	WJC	2	0	2	0	121	8	0	3.97	.864
2025	Czechia	WC	4	3	0	0	220	4	1	1.09	.951
2026	Czechia	OG	1	1	0	0	60	3	0	3.00	.750
Junior totals			6	2	3	0	316	19	1	3.61	.893
Senior totals			5	4	0	0	280	7	1	1.50	.925
