= Veeti Vainio =

Finnish ice hockey player

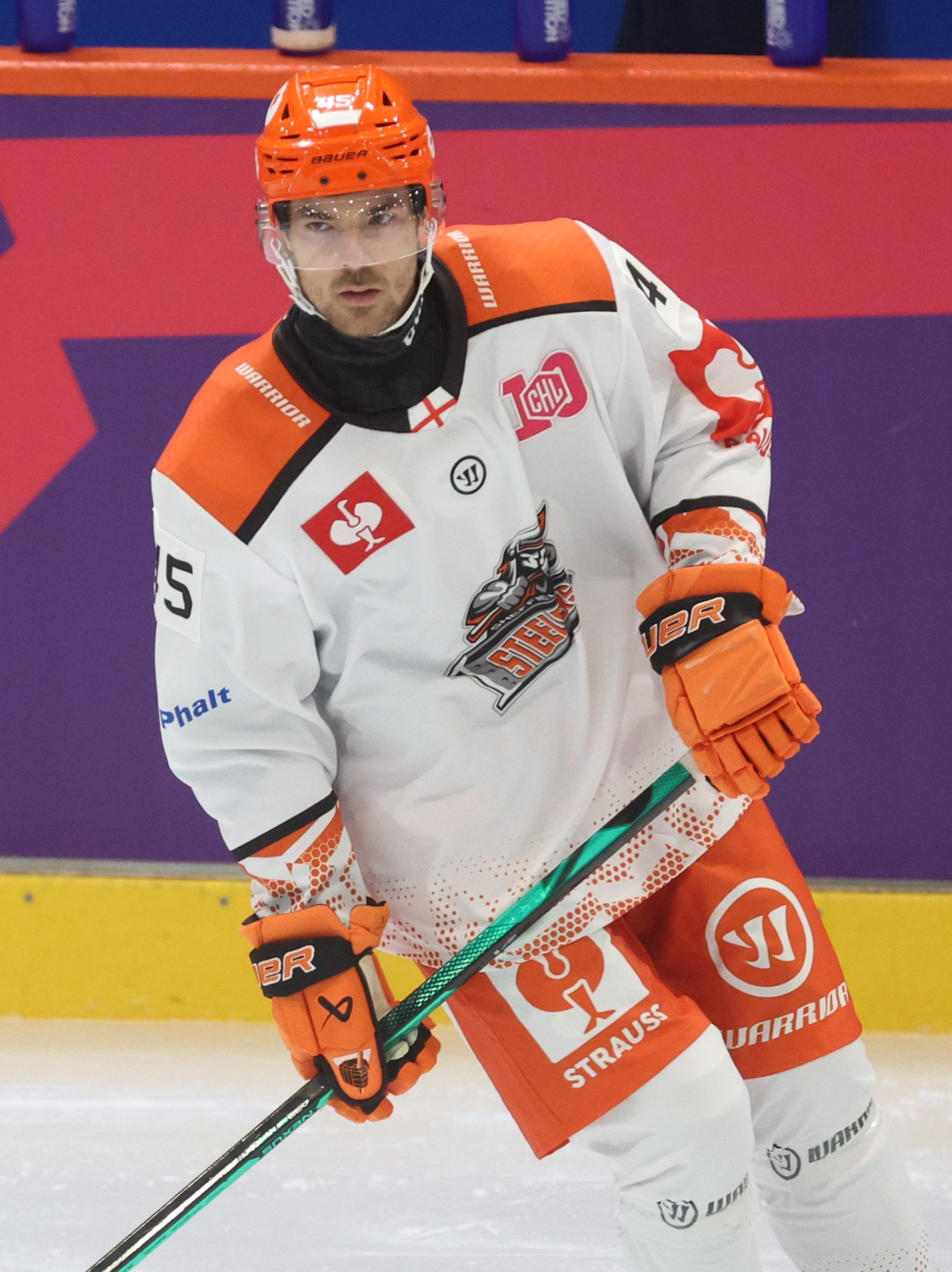
- Veeti Vainio in 2024
- Born: 16 June 1997 (age 28) Espoo, Finland
- Height: 6 ft 2 in (188 cm)
- Weight: 185 lb (84 kg; 13 st 3 lb)
- Position: Defence
- Shoots: Right
- EIHL team Former teams: Sheffield Steelers; Espoo Blues; KooKoo; SaiPa; Lahti Pelicans; IF Björklöven; Södertälje SK
- NHL draft: 141st overall, 2015; Columbus Blue Jackets
- Playing career: 2015–present

Veeti Vainio (born 16 June 1997) is a Finnish professional ice hockey defenceman. He is currently playing with Sheffield Steelers in the British Elite Ice Hockey League (EIHL). He was selected by the Columbus Blue Jackets in the fifth round, 141st overall, of the 2015 NHL entry draft.

== Playing career ==
Vainio made his Liiga debut playing with Espoo Blues during the 2014–15 Liiga season.

Following two seasons under contract within the KooKoo organization, Vainio left as a free agent prior to the 2018–19 season and agreed to continue in the Liiga by signing an optional two-year contract with SaiPa on May 3, 2018.

== Career statistics ==
=== Regular season and playoffs ===
			Regular season					Playoffs
Season	Team	League	GP	G	A	Pts	PIM	GP	G	A	Pts	PIM
2013–14	Espoo Blues	Jr. A	35	9	14	23	46	11	5	5	10	2
2014–15	Espoo Blues	Jr. A	42	13	31	44	42	5	2	5	7	4
2014–15	Espoo Blues	Liiga	2	0	1	1	0	1	0	0	0	0
2015–16	Espoo Blues	Liiga	30	0	4	4	47	—	—	—	—	—
2015–16	KeuPa HT	Mestis	6	1	4	5	18	—	—	—	—	—
2015–16	Espoo Blues	Jr. A	1	0	0	0	0	2	2	0	2	2
2016–17	KooKoo	Liiga	7	0	1	1	4	—	—	—	—	—
2016–17	Peliitat	Mestis	2	1	1	2	2	—	—	—	—	—
2017–18	Kiekko-Vantaa	Mestis	11	2	2	4	29	—	—	—	—	—
2018–19	SaiPa	Liiga	8	0	0	0	4	—	—	—	—	—
2019–20	SaiPa	Liiga	47	8	18	26	70	—	—	—	—	—
2020–21	SaiPa	Liiga	17	1	3	4	16	—	—	—	—	—
2020–21	Lahti Pelicans	Liiga	14	2	3	5	10	5	1	0	1	4
2021–22	IF Björklöven	Allsv	13	1	4	5	31	2	0	1	1	0
2022–23	IF Björklöven	Allsv	30	0	4	4	41	9	0	0	0	29
2023–24	Södertälje SK	Allsv	11	0	0	0	4	—	—	—	—	—
2024–25	Sheffield Steelers	EIHL	25	3	4	7	2	4	0	1	1	0
Liiga totals			125	11	30	41	151	6	1	0	1	4

=== International ===
Year	Team	Event	Result	GP	G	A	Pts	PIM
2014	Finland	IH18	5th	4	0	1	1	14
2015	Finland	U18	2nd place, silver medalist(s)	7	0	1	1	10
Junior totals				11	0	2	2	24
