= Jens Lööke =

Swedish ice hockey player (born 1997)

- Born: 11 April 1997 (age 29) Gävle, Sweden
- Height: 6 ft 0 in (183 cm)
- Weight: 180 lb (82 kg; 12 st 12 lb)
- Position: Right wing
- Shoots: Right
- Liiga team Former teams: Ilves; Brynäs IF; Timrå IK; Vaasan Sport
- NHL draft: 83rd overall, 2015; Arizona Coyotes
- Playing career: 2014–present

Jens Lööke (born 11 April 1997) is a Swedish professional ice hockey forward. He is currently playing with Ilves of the Liiga. Lööke was drafted 83rd overall by the Arizona Coyotes in the 2015 NHL entry draft.

== Playing career ==
Lööke made his Swedish Hockey League debut playing with Brynäs IF during the 2014–15 SHL season.

Prior to the 2015 NHL entry draft, he was seen as one of the top ten international skaters according to the NHL Central Scouting Bureau. He was eventually drafted 83rd overall by the Arizona Coyotes.

On 12 April 2017, Lööke was signed to a three-year entry-level contract with the Arizona Coyotes. After attending the Coyotes training camp, Lööke was assigned to their American Hockey League affiliate, the Tucson Roadrunners.

Following two seasons with the Roadrunners, and despite still having a year to run on his entry-level contract, Lööke opted to return to Sweden for the 2019–20 season, agreeing to a one-year deal with former club, Timrå IK of the Allsvenskan, on May 15, 2019. He was placed on unconditional waivers by the Coyotes and bought out from the final year of his contract on May 17, 2018.

After three seasons with Timrå IK, Lööke opted to sign in the Finnish Liiga, joining Vaasan Sport on a one-year contract on 11 April 2022.

== Career statistics ==
=== Regular season and playoffs ===
			Regular season					Playoffs
Season	Team	League	GP	G	A	Pts	PIM	GP	G	A	Pts	PIM
2011–12	Brynäs IF	J18	1	0	0	0	0	—	—	—	—	—
2012–13	Brynäs IF	J18	16	10	9	19	2	—	—	—	—	—
2012–13	Brynäs IF	J18 Allsv	18	6	5	11	0	8	2	6	8	2
2013–14	Brynäs IF	J18	15	8	14	22	2	—	—	—	—	—
2013–14	Brynäs IF	J18 Allsv	17	7	11	18	12	5	3	4	7	2
2013–14	Brynäs IF	J20	7	2	0	2	0	2	0	1	1	0
2014–15	Brynäs IF	J18 Allsv	1	1	4	5	0	4	3	3	6	0
2014–15	Brynäs IF	J20	18	10	8	18	4	2	1	1	2	2
2014–15	Brynäs IF	SHL	43	2	4	6	2	7	0	0	0	0
2015–16	Brynäs IF	SHL	5	0	0	0	2	—	—	—	—	—
2015–16	Almtuna IS	Allsv	30	3	8	11	2	—	—	—	—	—
2016–17	Timrå IK	Allsv	46	8	8	16	10	3	1	2	3	0
2016–17	Timrå IK	J20	—	—	—	—	—	4	1	6	7	2
2017–18	Tucson Roadrunners	AHL	59	6	11	17	10	5	0	0	0	0
2018–19	Tucson Roadrunners	AHL	61	8	7	15	12	—	—	—	—	—
2019–20	Timrå IK	Allsv	39	12	27	39	6	1	3	1	4	0
2020–21	Timrå IK	Allsv	52	23	39	62	16	15	4	10	14	4
2021–22	Timrå IK	SHL	49	8	13	21	10	—	—	—	—	—
2022–23	Vaasan Sport	Liiga	37	12	17	29	8	—	—	—	—	—
2022–23	IF Björklöven	Allsv	7	1	7	8	0	11	3	1	4	0
2023–24	Vaasan Sport	Liiga	42	17	18	35	10	2	0	1	1	0
2024–25	Ilves	Liiga	59	16	38	54	10	11	2	8	10	0
SHL totals			97	10	17	27	14	7	0	0	0	0
Liiga totals			138	45	73	118	28	13	2	9	11	0

=== International ===
Year	Team	Event	Result	GP	G	A	Pts	PIM
2014	Sweden	IH18	4th	5	0	4	4	2
2015	Sweden	WJC	4th	7	3	0	3	0
2015	Sweden	WJC18	8th	4	0	0	0	2
2016	Sweden	WJC	4th	7	1	3	4	0
2017	Sweden	WJC	4th	7	1	1	2	0
Junior totals				30	5	8	13	4
