= Tommy Novak =

American ice hockey player (born 1997)

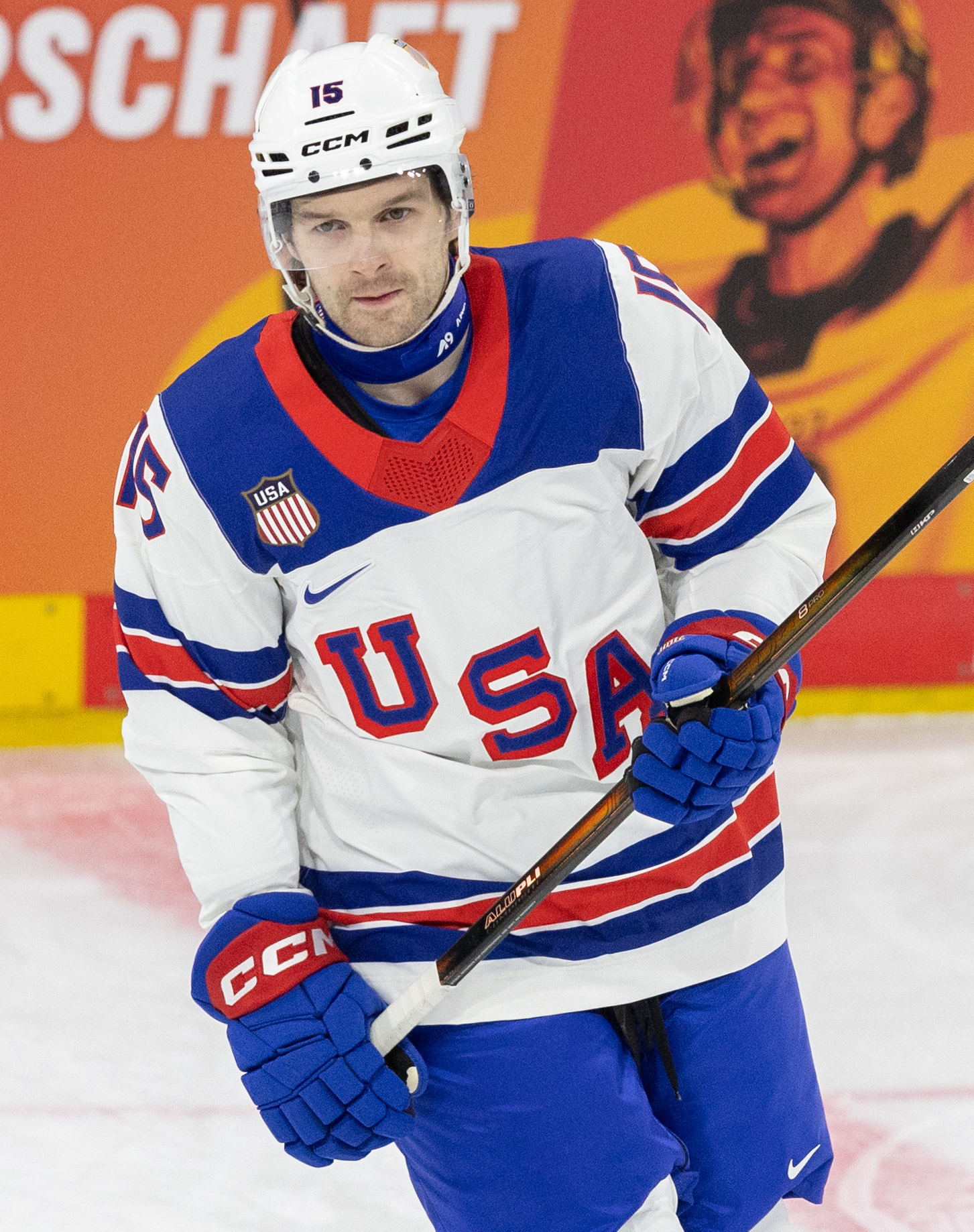
- Novak with Team USA in 2026
- Born: April 28, 1997 (age 29) Saint Paul, Minnesota, U.S.
- Height: 6 ft 1 in (185 cm)
- Weight: 190 lb (86 kg; 13 st 8 lb)
- Position: Forward
- Shoots: Left
- NHL team Former teams: Pittsburgh Penguins; Nashville Predators
- National team: United States
- NHL draft: 85th overall, 2015; Nashville Predators
- Playing career: 2019–present

Thomas Novak (born April 28, 1997) is an American professional ice hockey player who is a forward for the Pittsburgh Penguins of the National Hockey League (NHL). He was drafted with the 85th overall pick by the Nashville Predators in the third round of the 2015 NHL entry draft.

== Early life ==
Novak was born on April 28, 1997, in Saint Paul, Minnesota, to John and Patti Novak. Although he was born in Minnesota, Novak was raised in River Falls, Wisconsin.

== Playing career ==
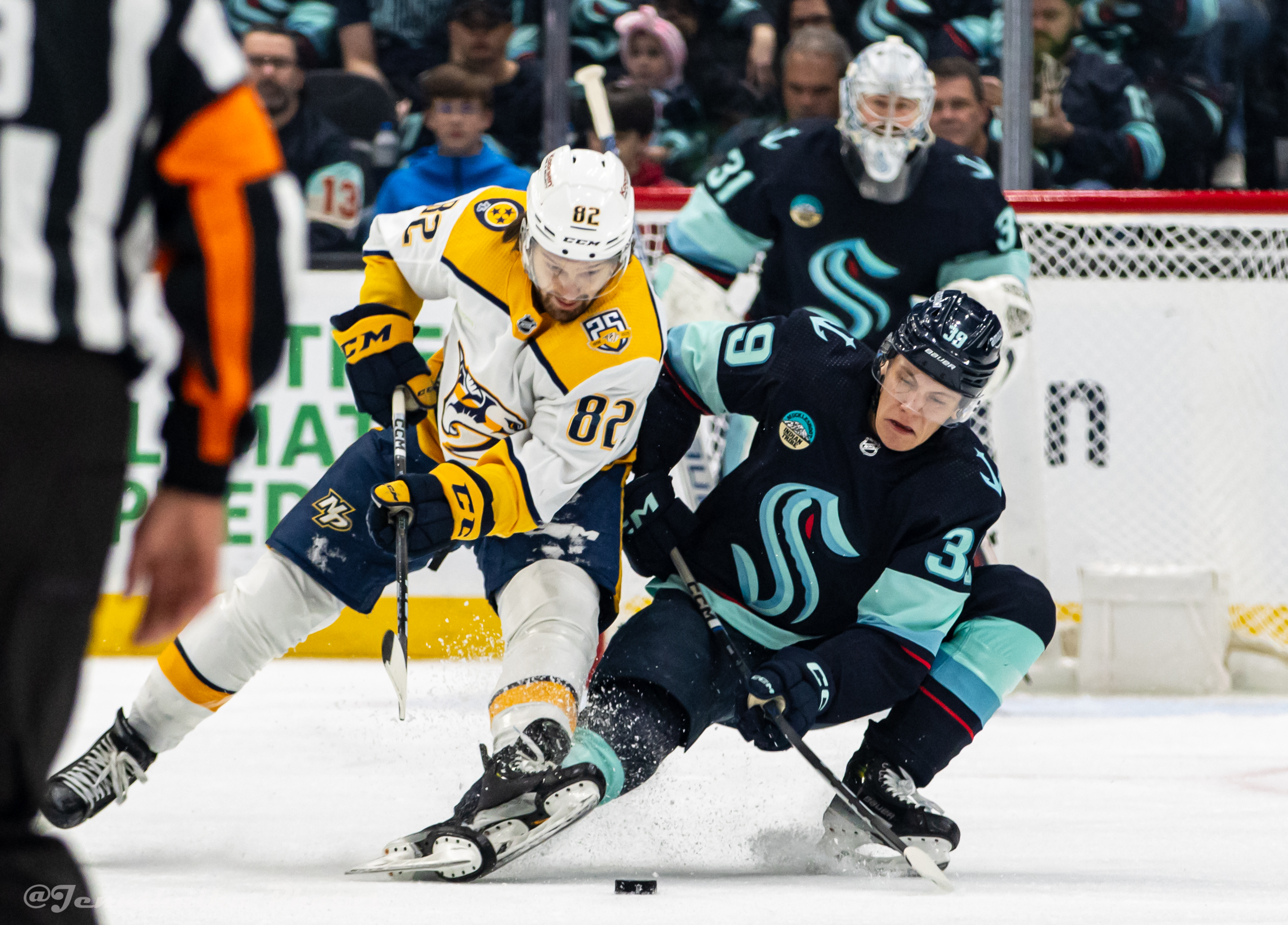
Novak (left) battling for the puck against Ryker Evans of the Seattle Kraken in 2024.

After three years of high school hockey at Saint Thomas Academy, Novak joined the Waterloo Black Hawks for the 2014–15 USHL season. Novak's outstanding play with the Black Hawks was rewarded when he was invited to skate in the 2014 CCM/USA Hockey All-American Prospects Game. In June 2015, Novak was drafted by the Nashville Predators in the third round of the 2015 NHL entry draft.

Novak played college hockey for the Minnesota Golden Gophers from 2015 to 2019.

After his college career, he signed with the Milwaukee Admirals of the American Hockey League (AHL) on March 20, 2019.

Novak was named AHL Rookie of the Month for November 2019.

He signed an entry-level contract with Nashville on March 25, 2020, and played in his first NHL game on October 19, 2021. On December 17, 2021, Novak scored his first NHL goal, against Chicago Blackhawks goaltender Marc-André Fleury in a 3–2 Nashville win.

In July 2022, Novak re-signed with Nashville on a one-year contract. On February 8, 2023, he signed a new one-year contract with Nashville. Novak finished the 2022–23 NHL season with 17 goals.

On November 14, 2023, Novak was placed on injured reserve with an upperbody injury. He returned to the line-up on December 7 after missing 11 games. On March 4, 2024, the Predators re-signed Novak to a three-year, $10.5 million contract.

On March 5, 2025, Novak was traded to the Pittsburgh Penguins, alongside Luke Schenn, for Michael Bunting and a fourth round draft pick. In his second game with Pittsburgh, he suffered a stress fracture in his leg, and missed the remainder of the 2024–25 NHL season.

Novak returned in the 2025-26 season, playing in all 82 games for the first time in his career, scoring 42 points.

On July 31, 2026, Novak signed a three-year contract with the Penguins.

== International play ==
Novak helped lead the United States national under-18 team to a bronze medal at the 2014 Ivan Hlinka Memorial Tournament, and he recorded seven points in four games as a member of the United States national junior team at the 2014 World Junior A Challenge.

== Career statistics ==
=== Regular season and playoffs ===
			Regular season					Playoffs
Season	Team	League	GP	G	A	Pts	PIM	GP	G	A	Pts	PIM
2011–12	St. Thomas Academy	USHS	25	14	20	34	0	6	4	5	9	2
2012–13	St. Thomas Academy	USHS	25	25	22	47	6	6	3	7	10	0
2013–14	St. Thomas Academy	USHS	25	26	44	70	8	3	4	4	8	2
2013–14	U.S. National Development Team	USHL	2	0	0	0	0	—	—	—	—	—
2014–15	Waterloo Black Hawks	USHL	46	14	34	48	12	—	—	—	—	—
2015–16	U. of Minnesota	B1G	37	6	21	27	4	—	—	—	—	—
2016–17	U. of Minnesota	B1G	20	5	9	14	10	—	—	—	—	—
2017–18	U. of Minnesota	B1G	34	3	23	26	8	—	—	—	—	—
2018–19	U. of Minnesota	B1G	38	4	17	21	4	—	—	—	—	—
2018–19	Milwaukee Admirals	AHL	3	0	1	1	0	1	0	0	0	0
2019–20	Milwaukee Admirals	AHL	60	11	31	42	18	—	—	—	—	—
2020–21	Florida Everblades	ECHL	3	1	2	3	0	—	—	—	—	—
2020–21	Chicago Wolves	AHL	27	8	24	32	4	—	—	—	—	—
2021–22	Milwaukee Admirals	AHL	42	7	27	34	16	6	1	5	6	2
2021–22	Nashville Predators	NHL	27	1	6	7	2	—	—	—	—	—
2022–23	Milwaukee Admirals	AHL	25	11	15	26	2	—	—	—	—	—
2022–23	Nashville Predators	NHL	51	17	26	43	8	—	—	—	—	—
2023–24	Nashville Predators	NHL	71	18	27	45	8	6	0	0	0	0
2024–25	Nashville Predators	NHL	52	13	9	22	4	—	—	—	—	—
2024–25	Pittsburgh Penguins	NHL	2	0	0	0	0	—	—	—	—	—
2025–26	Pittsburgh Penguins	NHL	82	16	26	42	24	6	0	2	2	0
NHL totals			285	65	94	159	46	12	0	2	2	0

=== International ===
Year	Team	Event	Result	GP	G	A	Pts	PIM
2014	United States	IH18	3rd place, bronze medalist(s)	5	5	6	11	2
2026	United States	WC	8th	8	1	7	8	0
Junior totals				5	5	6	11	2
Senior totals				8	1	7	8	0

== Awards and honors ==
Award	Year	Ref
USHL
CCM/USA Hockey All-American Prospects Game	2014	
All-Rookie Second Team	2015	
