= Kasper Björkqvist =

Finnish ice hockey player (born 1997)

- Born: 10 July 1997 (age 29) Espoo, Finland
- Height: 6 ft 1 in (185 cm)
- Weight: 214 lb (97 kg; 15 st 4 lb)
- Position: Winger
- Shoots: Left
- Liiga team Former teams: Ilves; KooKoo; Pittsburgh Penguins; Oulun Kärpät
- NHL draft: 61st overall, 2016; Pittsburgh Penguins
- Playing career: 2019–present

Kasper Björkqvist (born 10 July 1997) is a Finnish professional ice hockey winger who is currently playing for Ilves in the Liiga. He was selected by the Pittsburgh Penguins in the second round, 61st overall, of the 2016 NHL entry draft.

== Playing career ==
Björkqvist played as a youth with hometown club, the Espoo Blues, and after collecting MVP honors as a prolific scorer in the Nuorten SM-liiga he was selected in the second round, 61st overall, of the 2016 NHL entry draft by the Pittsburgh Penguins.

Moving to North America, Björkqvist continued his development by committing to a collegiate career with Providence College of the Hockey East. He was signed to a two-year, entry-level contract with the Penguins following his junior season with the Friars on 15 May 2019.

In his first professional season in 2019–20, Björkqvist was assigned by Pittsburgh to AHL affiliate, the Wilkes-Barre/Scranton Penguins, appearing in just 6 games before sustaining a season-ending shoulder injury.

In the pandemic-delayed 2020–21 season, Björkqvist opted to remain in Finland to continue his development in joining Liiga club, KooKoo, on loan from the Penguins on 24 August 2020. He enjoyed a productive stint in the Liiga, leading all rookies in league scoring with 26 points through 44 regular season games to earn rookie of the year honors. He returned to the AHL following KooKoo's playoff defeat, posting 1 goal through 5 regular-season games.

As a restricted free agent with the Penguins, Björkqvist was re-signed to a one-year, two-way contract on 25 July 2021. In the following 2021–22 season, having started the campaign in the AHL, Björkqvist was recalled by Pittsburgh and made his NHL debut, scoring his first NHL goal, in a 8–5 victory over the San Jose Sharks on 2 January 2022.

As an impending restricted free agent with the Penguins, Björkqvist opted to return to his homeland, agreeing to a two-year contract with Kärpät of the Liiga on 28 June 2022.

== Career statistics ==
=== Regular season and playoffs ===
			Regular season					Playoffs
Season	Team	League	GP	G	A	Pts	PIM	GP	G	A	Pts	PIM
2013–14	Espoo Blues	Jr. A	17	3	4	7	8	—	—	—	—	—
2014–15	Espoo Blues	Jr. A	34	19	11	30	82	8	0	2	2	2
2015–16	Espoo Blues	Jr. A	45	28	38	66	32	2	1	1	2	2
2016–17	Providence College	HE	30	3	6	9	8	—	—	—	—	—
2017–18	Providence College	HE	40	16	7	23	16	—	—	—	—	—
2018–19	Providence College	HE	42	17	13	30	20	—	—	—	—	—
2019–20	Wilkes-Barre/Scranton Penguins	AHL	6	1	0	1	2	—	—	—	—	—
2020–21	KooKoo	Liiga	44	11	15	26	36	2	0	0	0	0
2020–21	Wilkes-Barre/Scranton Penguins	AHL	5	1	0	1	7	—	—	—	—	—
2021–22	Wilkes-Barre/Scranton Penguins	AHL	54	8	4	12	28	6	0	1	1	2
2021–22	Pittsburgh Penguins	NHL	6	1	0	1	2	—	—	—	—	—
Liiga totals			44	11	15	26	36	2	0	0	0	0
NHL totals			6	1	0	1	2	—	—	—	—	—

Medal record

Representing Finland

Ice hockey

World Junior Championship
Gold medal – first place	2016 Finland	

IIHF World U18 Championship
Silver medal – second place	2015 Switzerland	

=== International ===
Year	Team	Event	Result	GP	G	A	Pts	PIM
2014	Finland	IH18	5th	4	2	0	2	2
2015	Finland	U18	2nd place, silver medalist(s)	7	0	0	0	0
2016	Finland	WJC	1st place, gold medalist(s)	7	1	1	2	2
2017	Finland	WJC	9th	6	1	1	2	4
Junior totals				24	4	2	6	8

== Awards and honors ==
Award	Year
Jr. A
Saku Koivu Award (Best Forward)	2016
Teemu Selanne Award (MVP)	2016
First All-Star Team	2016
Liiga
Rookie of the Year	2021
