= Lukáš Jašek =

Czech ice hockey player (born 1997)

- Born: 28 August 1997 (age 28) Třinec, Czech Republic
- Height: 183 cm (6 ft 0 in)
- Weight: 84 kg (185 lb; 13 st 3 lb)
- Position: Right wing
- Shoots: Right
- Liiga team Former teams: Ilves; HC Oceláři Třinec; HC Bílí Tygři Liberec; Utica Comets; Lahti Pelicans; IK Oskarshamn; MoDo Hockey
- NHL draft: 174th overall, 2015; Vancouver Canucks
- Playing career: 2014–present

Lukáš Jašek (born 28 August 1997) is a Czech professional ice hockey forward who currently plays for Ilves of the Liiga.

== Playing career ==
Jašek made his Czech Extraliga (ELH) professional debut playing with HC Oceláři Třinec during the 2014–15 Czech Extraliga season. He was selected in the sixth round, 174th overall, by the Vancouver Canucks in the 2015 NHL entry draft.

On 20 April 2018, Jašek signed a three-year, entry-level contract with the Vancouver Canucks of the NHL. He was assigned to the Canucks AHL affiliate, the Utica Comets for the remainder of the 2017–18 season.

On 24 August 2020, Jašek was assigned by the Vancouver Canucks to original club, HC Oceláři Třinec of the Czech Extraliga, on loan until the commencement of the delayed 2020–21 North American season.

As an impending restricted free agent, having been unable to make the NHL, Jašek left the Canucks organization in agreeing to a one-year contract with Finnish club, Lahti Pelicans of the Liiga, on 12 June 2021.

== Career statistics ==
=== Regular season and playoffs ===
			Regular season					Playoffs
Season	Team	League	GP	G	A	Pts	PIM	GP	G	A	Pts	PIM
2012–13	HC Oceláři Třinec	Czech20	2	0	0	0	0	—	—	—	—	—
2013–14	Södertälje SK	J20	25	2	2	4	10	—	—	—	—	—
2014–15	HC Oceláři Třinec	Czech20	24	10	17	27	6	—	—	—	—	—
2014–15	HC Oceláři Třinec	ELH	27	0	2	2	4	1	0	0	0	0
2015–16	HC Oceláři Třinec	Czech20	14	15	13	28	45	10	9	16	25	6
2015–16	HC Oceláři Třinec	ELH	25	2	1	3	18	1	0	0	0	0
2015–16	AZ Havířov	Czech.1	2	0	0	0	2	—	—	—	—	—
2015–16	HC Frýdek-Místek	Czech.2	2	1	0	1	2	—	—	—	—	—
2016–17	HC Oceláři Třinec	Czech20	2	0	3	3	0	6	4	10	14	0
2016–17	HC Oceláři Třinec	ELH	16	0	0	0	2	4	0	1	1	2
2016–17	HC Frýdek-Místek	Czech.1	30	9	19	28	16	8	3	3	6	54
2017–18	HC Bílí Tygři Liberec	ELH	48	8	10	18	28	10	0	1	1	2
2017–18	HC Benátky nad Jizerou	Czech.1	4	1	3	4	4	—	—	—	—	—
2017–18	Utica Comets	AHL	6	3	4	7	2	1	0	0	0	0
2018–19	Utica Comets	AHL	63	9	20	29	24	—	—	—	—	—
2019–20	Utica Comets	AHL	56	14	13	27	22	—	—	—	—	—
2020–21	HC Oceláři Třinec	ELH	19	2	10	12	4	—	—	—	—	—
2020–21	Utica Comets	AHL	28	4	19	23	8	—	—	—	—	—
2021–22	Lahti Pelicans	Liiga	54	13	38	51	30	3	0	1	1	4
2022–23	Lahti Pelicans	Liiga	57	18	21	39	53	18	6	7	13	8
2023–24	IK Oskarshamn	SHL	49	14	14	28	39	—	—	—	—	—
2024–25	MoDo Hockey	SHL	52	8	10	18	20	—	—	—	—	—
ELH totals			135	12	23	35	56	16	0	2	2	4
Liiga totals			111	31	59	90	83	21	6	8	14	12
SHL totals			101	22	24	46	59	—	—	—	—	—

=== International ===
Year	Team	Event	Result	GP	G	A	Pts	PIM
2014	Czech Republic	IH18	2nd place, silver medalist(s)	5	4	3	7	0
2015	Czech Republic	WJC18	6th	5	0	0	0	0
2017	Czech Republic	WJC	6th	5	0	0	0	0
Junior totals				15	4	3	7	0
