= Jansen Harkins =

Canadian ice hockey player (born 1997)

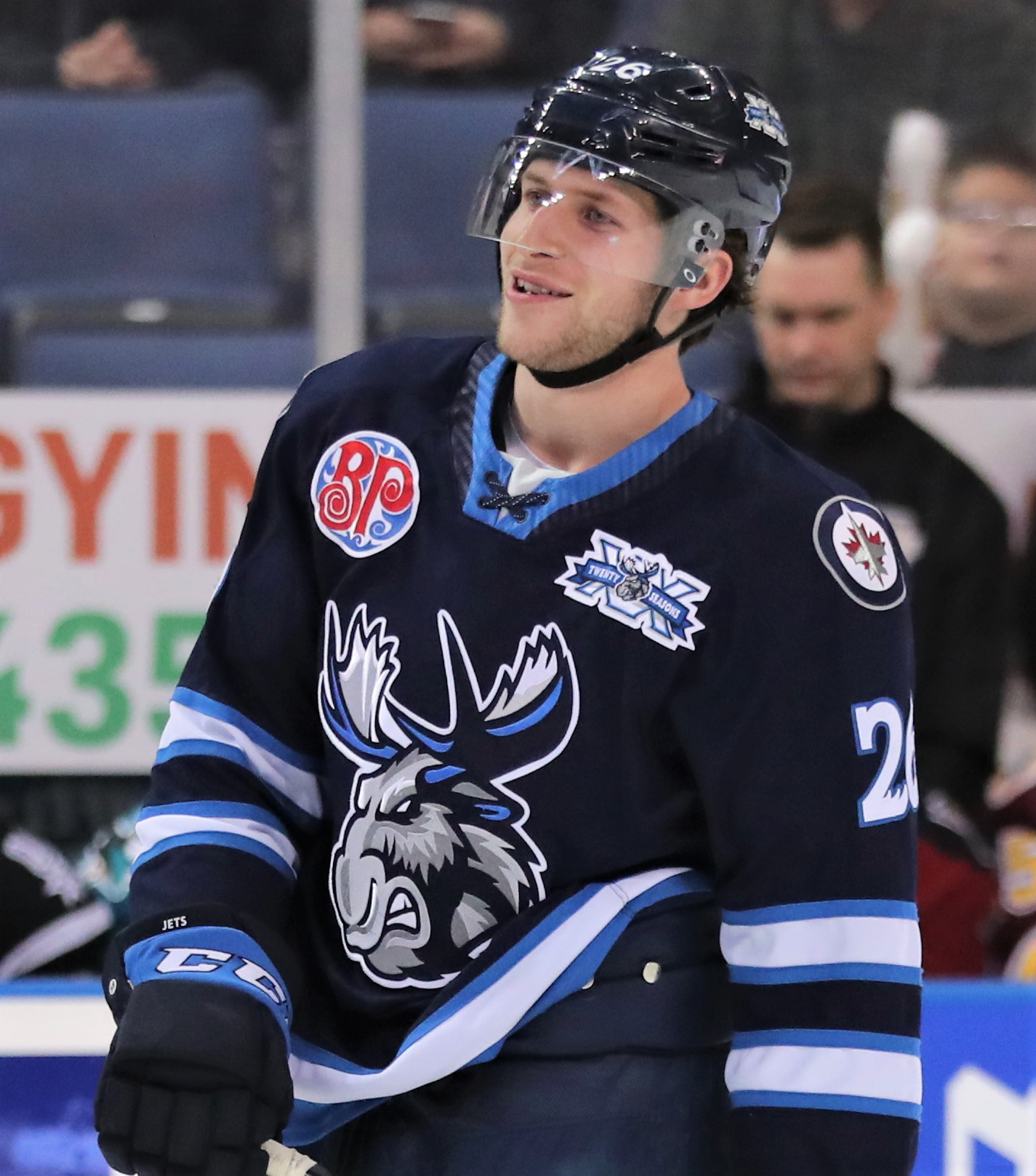
- Harkins with the Manitoba Moose in 2020
- Born: May 23, 1997 (age 29) Cleveland, Ohio, U.S.
- Height: 6 ft 1 in (185 cm)
- Weight: 197 lb (89 kg; 14 st 1 lb)
- Position: Centre
- Shoots: Left
- NHL team (P) Cur. team Former teams: Tampa Bay Lightning; Syracuse Crunch (AHL); Winnipeg Jets; Pittsburgh Penguins; Anaheim Ducks
- NHL draft: 47th overall, 2015; Winnipeg Jets
- Playing career: 2016–present

Jansen Michael Harkins (born May 23, 1997) is an American–Canadian professional ice hockey player who is a center for the Syracuse Crunch of the American Hockey League (AHL) while under contract with the Tampa Bay Lightning of the National Hockey League (NHL). Harkins was selected by the Winnipeg Jets in the second round, 47th overall, in the 2015 NHL entry draft. He has also played for the Pittsburgh Penguins and the Anaheim Ducks.

== Playing career ==
=== Amateur ===
Harkins was selected second overall by the Prince George Cougars of the Western Hockey League (WHL) in the 2012 WHL bantam draft and played with the Cougars beginning in the 2012–13 WHL season. In 2013–14, Harkins skated in 67 games for Prince George in his first WHL season, and was a team captain for Canada Pacific in the 2014 World Hockey Challenge. He scored 10 goals with 24 assists, and was minus 9 with 18 penalty minutes for the Cougars. During the 2014–15 WHL season, Harkins led Prince George in scoring in his second WHL season. He scored 20 goals with 59 assists and was +7 with 45 penalty minutes, in 70 regular season games for the Cougars. He set a new team record for assists that season for the Cougars. Harkins was selected to skate in the 2015 CHL/NHL Top Prospects Game as part of Team Orr. Harkins was rewarded with the Dan Hamhuis Award, which is presented to the most valuable player on the Prince George Cougars. Harkins continued his strong play the following year, scoring 24 goals, 33 assists for 57 points in 69 games for the Cougars during the 2015–16 season. He finished his Cougars career in the 2016–17 season, becoming the team's all time assists and points leader and led the team in scoring again with 21 goals and 51 assists in 64 games.

=== Professional ===
Harkins was selected by the Winnipeg Jets of the National Hockey League (NHL) in the second round, 47th overall, of the 2015 NHL entry draft. He signed an amateur tryout agreement with Winnipeg's American Hockey League affiliate, the Manitoba Moose, on April 2, 2016, after his WHL season had ended. Harkins scored one goal and three points in six games for the Moose. He signed a three-year entry-level contract with Winnipeg on April 7, 2017 and finished the 2016–17 AHL season with the Moose. He was assigned to Manitoba to start the 2017–18 season but only scored 2 goals in 46 games with the Moose. He was reassigned to the ECHL with the Jacksonville Icemen beginning in January 2018, to help rebuild his confidence. He spent the entire 2018–19 season with the Moose, scoring 15 goals in 70 games. He began the 2019–20 season in the AHL and put up 31 points in 30 games and was named the CCM/AHL Player of the Month for November 2019. He was named Manitoba's most valuable player for the 2019–20 season and participated in the 2020 AHL All-Star Classic. He was recalled by the Jets along with forward Mason Appleton on December 18, 2019 after forwards Andrew Copp and Mathieu Perreault were injured.

He made his NHL debut on December 21, 2019 in a 6–0 victory over the Minnesota Wild and earned his first NHL point in the game, assisting on Logan Shaw's third period goal. Harkins scored his first NHL goal against goaltender Jordan Binnington in a 4–2 victory over the St. Louis Blues on February 6, 2020. He also assisted on Andrew Copp's game-winning goal, marking his first multi-point game in the NHL. His rookie season was cut short when the season was suspended due to the COVID-19 pandemic on March 12. When play resumed in August, Harkins made his NHL playoff debut when he appeared in three of the Jets' 2020 Stanley Cup playoffs qualifying round games. He scored his first NHL playoff goal on August 3 against Cam Talbot in a 3–2 victory over the Calgary Flames. During the offseason, on October 27, 2020, the Jets re-signed Harkins to a two-year contract.

In the following pandemic-shortened 2020–21 season, Jansen made his NHL season debut in the second game of the season, a 3–1 loss to the Toronto Maple Leafs on January 18, 2021, replacing the injured Patrick Laine in the lineup. He remained with the Jets all season, and scored his only goal of the season on an empty net in the final game, a 4–2 victory over the Maple Leafs on May 14. Harkins made his only appearance in the 2021 Stanley Cup playoffs in game 2 of the second-round series against the Montreal Canadiens, replacing the injured Paul Stastny, going scoreless. Hansen played the entire 2021–22 season with the Jets, setting career highs in games played with 77, goals with 7, assists with 6 and points with 13. He re-signed with the Jets on July 16, 2022 to a two-year contract worth $1.7 million. At the beginning of the 2022–23 season Harkins was waived and after going unclaimed, he and defenceman Ville Heinola were assigned to Manitoba. He split the remainder of the season between Winnipeg and the Moose, playing in 22 games with the Jets and scoring three goals and five points. He played in 44 games with Manitoba, scoring 13 goals and 27 points, good for second best on the Moose.

Towards the end of the Jets' 2023 training camp, Harkins was placed on waivers, where if he cleared, he would be assigned to Manitoba. However, he was claimed the Pittsburgh Penguins on October 2, 2023. He made his Penguins debut in the team's season opener, a 4–2 loss to the Chicago Blackhawks on October 10, 2023. He appeared in four games, going pointless before being placed on waivers by Pittsburgh on October 19. He went unclaimed and was assigned to the Penguins' AHL affiliate, the Wilkes-Barre/Scranton Penguins. He split the remainder of the season between the NHL and AHL. After his return from his second demotion, Harkins established himself as a regular on Pittsburgh's fourth line, playing with Jeff Carter and Noel Acciari. He played in 45 games for Pittsburgh, registering only four assists and 5 goals and 12 points in 14 games for Wilkes-Barre/Scranton.

After a lone year with the Penguins, Harkins left as a unrestricted free agent at the conclusion of his contract to sign a two-year, $1.575 million contract with the Anaheim Ducks on July 2, 2024. He was placed on waivers during the 2024 training camp, and after going unclaimed, assigned to the Ducks' AHL affiliate, the San Diego Gulls to start the 2023–24 season. He was recalled by Anaheim on October 18 and made his Ducks debut that night against the Colorado Avalanche. After the one game, he was returned to San Diego. He was recalled a second time on November 13 along with defenseman Drew Helleson.

After two seasons within the Ducks organization, Harkins was signed as a free agent to a one-year, two-way contract with the Tampa Bay Lightning for the 2026–27 season on July 3, 2026.

== International play ==
Medal record

Representing Canada

Ice hockey

Ivan Hlinka Memorial Tournament
Gold medal – first place	2014 Piešťany	

IIHF World U18 Championship
Bronze medal – third place	2015 Switzerland	

Harkins helped Team Canada capture the gold medal at the 2014 Ivan Hlinka Memorial Tournament, and he went on to play again for Canada at the 2015 IIHF World U18 Championships, winning a bronze medal.

== Personal life ==
His father is former NHL player Todd Harkins. Harkins was born in Cleveland, Ohio, but grew up in North Vancouver, British Columbia; he has dual citizenship.

== Career statistics ==
=== Regular season and playoffs ===
			Regular season					Playoffs
Season	Team	League	GP	G	A	Pts	PIM	GP	G	A	Pts	PIM
2012–13	Prince George Cougars	WHL	5	0	0	0	2	—	—	—	—	—
2013–14	Prince George Cougars	WHL	67	10	24	34	18	—	—	—	—	—
2014–15	Prince George Cougars	WHL	70	20	59	79	45	5	0	4	4	2
2015–16	Prince George Cougars	WHL	69	24	33	57	51	4	2	3	5	4
2015–16	Manitoba Moose	AHL	6	1	2	3	2	—	—	—	—	—
2016–17	Prince George Cougars	WHL	64	21	51	72	48	6	2	5	7	10
2016–17	Manitoba Moose	AHL	4	2	2	4	4	—	—	—	—	—
2017–18	Manitoba Moose	AHL	46	2	11	13	17	2	0	0	0	0
2017–18	Jacksonville Icemen	ECHL	6	2	4	6	4	—	—	—	—	—
2018–19	Manitoba Moose	AHL	70	15	16	31	37	—	—	—	—	—
2019–20	Manitoba Moose	AHL	30	7	24	31	28	—	—	—	—	—
2019–20	Winnipeg Jets	NHL	29	2	5	7	5	3	1	0	1	4
2020–21	Winnipeg Jets	NHL	26	1	1	2	4	1	0	0	0	0
2021–22	Winnipeg Jets	NHL	77	7	6	13	15	—	—	—	—	—
2022–23	Winnipeg Jets	NHL	22	3	2	5	12	—	—	—	—	—
2022–23	Manitoba Moose	AHL	44	25	25	50	36	5	4	3	7	4
2023–24	Pittsburgh Penguins	NHL	45	0	4	4	21	—	—	—	—	—
2023–24	Wilkes-Barre/Scranton Penguins	AHL	14	5	7	12	14	—	—	—	—	—
2024–25	San Diego Gulls	AHL	11	5	12	17	8	—	—	—	—	—
2024–25	Anaheim Ducks	NHL	62	2	4	6	21	—	—	—	—	—
2025–26	Anaheim Ducks	NHL	44	3	5	8	28	3	1	0	1	0
NHL totals			305	18	27	45	106	7	2	0	2	4

=== International ===
Year	Team	Event	Result	GP	G	A	Pts	PIM
2014	Canada	IH18	1st place, gold medalist(s)	5	2	4	6	0
2015	Canada	U18	3rd place, bronze medalist(s)	7	3	2	5	10
Junior totals				12	5	6	11	10

== Awards and honors ==
Award	Year	Reference
CHL/NHL Top Prospects Game	2015	
