= Jeremy Roy (ice hockey) =

Canadian ice hockey player (born 1997)

Jérémy Roy
- Born: May 14, 1997 (age 29) Richelieu, Quebec, Canada
- Height: 6 ft 0 in (183 cm)
- Weight: 195 lb (88 kg; 13 st 13 lb)
- Position: Defence
- Shoots: Right
- KHL team Former teams: CSKA Moscow; San Jose Barracuda; San Diego Gulls; HKM Zvolen; HC Vityaz
- NHL draft: 31st overall, 2015; San Jose Sharks
- Playing career: 2017–present

Jérémy Roy (born May 14, 1997) is a Canadian professional ice hockey defenceman. He is currently playing with HC CSKA Moscow in the Kontinental Hockey League (KHL). Roy was drafted with the 31st overall pick by the Sharks in the second round of the 2015 NHL entry draft.

== Playing career ==
=== Junior ===
Roy was drafted by the Sherbrooke Phoenix 4th overall in the 2013 QMJHL Entry Draft. In his first season with Sherbrooke he was named to the 2013–14 QMJHL All-Rookie Team and awarded the Raymond Lagacé Trophy as the league's Defensive Rookie of the Year. The following season his outstanding play was rewarded when he was chosen to skate in the 2015 CHL/NHL Top Prospects Game.

=== Professional ===
On September 13, 2015, Roy signed a three-year entry-level contract with the San Jose Sharks.

After his entry-level contract, with his tenure within the Sharks largely affected through injury, Roy, as an impending restricted free agent, was not tendered a qualifying offer by San Jose and was released to free agency on October 9, 2020.

Un-signed leading into the pandemic delayed 2020–21 season, Roy was signed to a professional try-out contract with the San Diego Gulls of the AHL, the primary affiliate to the Anaheim Ducks, on January 13, 2021.

In the following 2021–22 season, Roy embarked on a European career in joining Slovakian club, HKM Zvolen of the Slovak Extraliga. Roy enjoyed a productive first season abroad, registering 8 goals and 33 points through 48 regular-season games.

As a free agent, Roy opted to continue his career overseas, signing a one-year contract with Russian club HC Vityaz of the KHL on June 14, 2022.

Following three seasons with Vityaz, Roy joined CSKA Moscow after Vityaz failed to match a two-year offer sheet on 12 June 2025.

== International play ==
Roy won a gold medal as a member of Team Canada at the 2014 Ivan Hlinka Memorial Tournament, and also competed at the 2015 IIHF World U18 Championships where he led Team Canada to a bronze medal and was selected as one of Canada's Top 3 players.

== Career statistics ==
=== Regular season and playoffs ===
			Regular season					Playoffs
Season	Team	League	GP	G	A	Pts	PIM	GP	G	A	Pts	PIM
2011–12	Collège Antoine-Girouard Gaulois	QMAAA	41	7	25	32	22	11	1	2	3	2
2012–13	Collège Antoine-Girouard Gaulois	QMAAA	42	12	42	54	18	13	4	11	15	6
2013–14	Sherbrooke Phoenix	QMJHL	64	14	30	44	23	—	—	—	—	—
2014–15	Sherbrooke Phoenix	QMJHL	46	5	38	43	37	6	1	4	5	0
2015–16	Sherbrooke Phoenix	QMJHL	45	6	28	34	27	—	—	—	—	—
2016–17	Blainville-Boisbriand Armada	QMJHL	10	2	1	3	9	—	—	—	—	—
2017–18	San Jose Barracuda	AHL	20	2	6	8	6	—	—	—	—	—
2018–19	San Jose Barracuda	AHL	58	6	15	21	18	—	—	—	—	—
2019–20	San Jose Barracuda	AHL	35	1	7	8	28	—	—	—	—	—
2020–21	San Diego Gulls	AHL	16	0	2	2	15	—	—	—	—	—
2021–22	HKM Zvolen	Slovak	48	8	25	33	53	11	1	1	2	33
2022–23	HC Vityaz	KHL	68	4	27	31	44	5	0	1	1	22
2023–24	HC Vityaz	KHL	67	4	27	31	17	—	—	—	—	—
2024–25	HC Vityaz	KHL	60	7	18	25	18	—	—	—	—	—
2025–26	CSKA Moscow	KHL	60	4	11	15	16	10	2	2	4	4
AHL totals			129	9	30	39	67	—	—	—	—	—
KHL totals			255	19	83	102	95	15	2	3	5	26

=== International ===
Year	Team	Event	Result	GP	G	A	Pts	PIM
2014	Canada Quebec	U17	4th	6	1	4	5	17
2014	Canada	IH18	1st place, gold medalist(s)	5	0	3	3	4
2015	Canada	U18	3rd place, bronze medalist(s)	7	3	1	4	2
Junior totals				18	4	8	12	23

== Awards and honours ==
Award	Year
QMJHL All-Rookie Team	2013–14
Raymond Lagacé Trophy QMJHL Defensive Rookie of the Year	2013–14
Ivan Hlinka Memorial Tournament Gold Medal	2014
CHL/NHL Top Prospects Game	2015
IIHF World U18 Championship Bronze Medal	2015
IIHF World U18 Championship Team Canada Top 3 Player	2015
