= Jakub Zbořil =

Czech ice hockey player (born 1997)

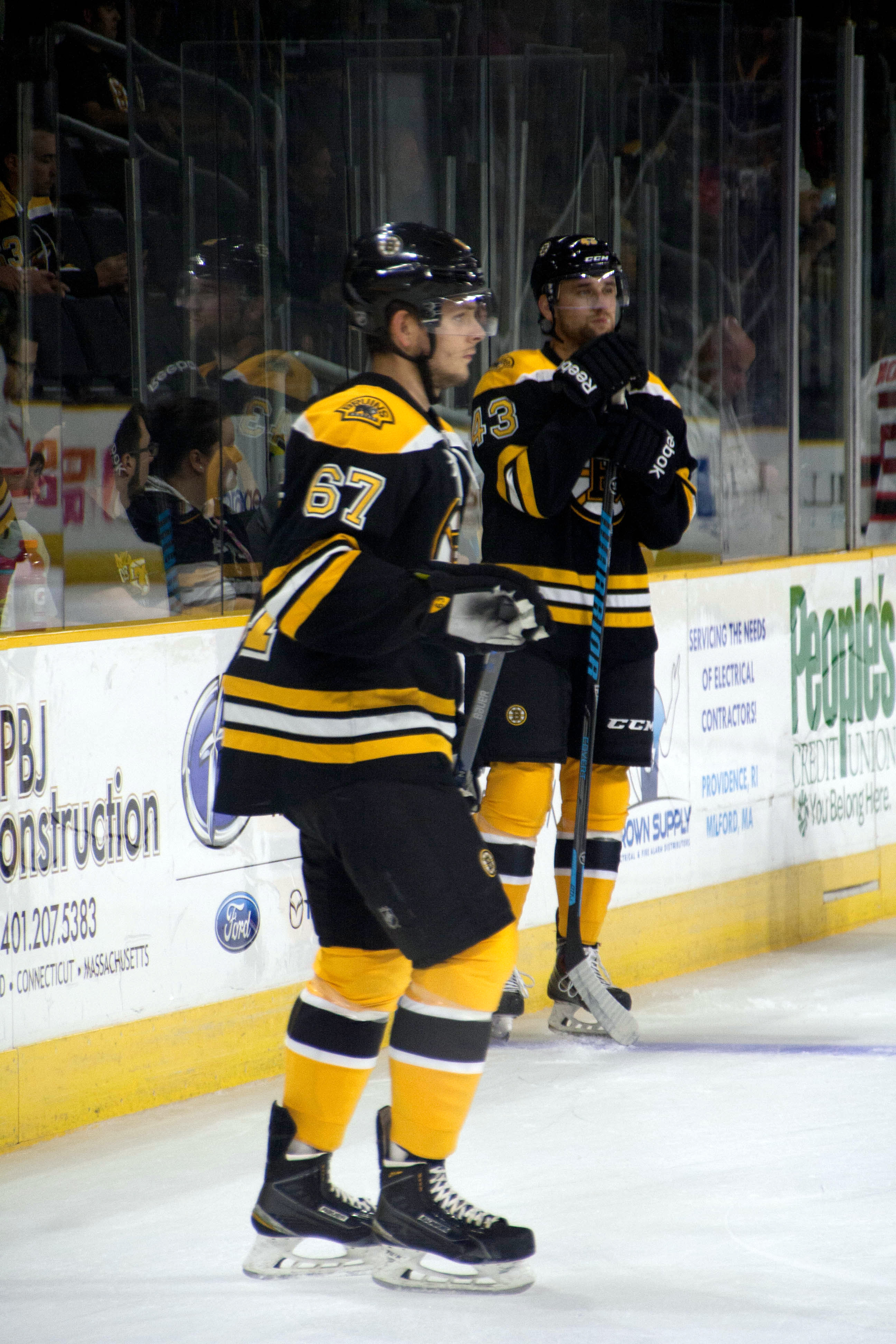
- Zbořil with the Boston Bruins in 2015
- Born: 21 February 1997 (age 29) Brno, Czech Republic
- Height: 6 ft 1 in (185 cm)
- Weight: 199 lb (90 kg; 14 st 3 lb)
- Position: Defence
- Shoots: Left
- ELH team Former teams: HC Vítkovice; Boston Bruins; HC Kometa Brno; HC Dynamo Pardubice
- National team: Czech Republic
- NHL draft: 13th overall, 2015; Boston Bruins
- Playing career: 2017–present

Jakub Zbořil (born 21 February 1997) is a Czech professional ice hockey defenceman who is currently playing with HC Vítkovice of the Czech Extraliga (ELH). He was selected by the Boston Bruins in the first round, 13th overall, at the 2015 NHL entry draft.

== Playing career ==
=== Amateur ===
Zbořil was drafted by the Saint John Sea Dogs in the first round, fifth overall, of the 2014 CHL Import Draft. His outstanding play with the Sea Dogs during the 2014–15 season was recognized when he was named to the 2014–15 QMJHL All-Rookie Team.

=== Professional ===
==== Boston Bruins ====
Leading up to the 2015 NHL entry draft on 26 June 2015, Zbořil was named as a top-rated prospect and was widely projected to be a first round selection at the draft. He was ultimately selected by the Boston Bruins with the 13th overall pick, acquired from the Los Angeles Kings in exchange for Milan Lucic, one of three consecutive first-round selections by the Bruins, along with Jake DeBrusk (14th overall) and Zachary Senyshyn (15th overall). On 15 July, Zbořil signed a three-year, entry-level contract with the Bruins.

It would not be until the 2018–19 season, with a depleted defensive corps at the time, that Zbořil would play his first NHL game with the Bruins. Zbořil made his NHL debut on 16 November 2018, in a 1–0 overtime loss to the Dallas Stars. However, he only appeared in two games for the Bruins that year before returning to the minors.

On 8 September 2020, with the North American season to be delayed, Zbořil was loaned by the Bruins to join Czech Extraliga club, HC Kometa Brno, to begin the 2020–21 season until the commencement of the Bruins training camp. While on loan with Brno, Zbořil as a restricted free agent with the Bruins, was signed to a two-year, $1.45 million extension on 14 October 2020. He appeared in his third game with the Bruins in the delayed season opener on 14 January 2021, against the New Jersey Devils. On 23 January, Zbořil recorded his first NHL point, an assist, in a 6–1 win against the Philadelphia Flyers. Throughout the shortened season, Zbořil was in-and-out of the Bruins lineup. In 42 total games, he had nine assists.

For the first time in his NHL career, Zbořil made the Bruins opening night roster to start the 2021–22 season. Although he started off as the team's seventh defenceman, once again going in-and-out of the lineup, by the Thanksgiving break, Zbořil had played himself into a regular role in the Bruins' starting lineup. Unfortunately, he was injured on 2 December 2021, in a game against the Nashville Predators. It was later revealed that he had suffered a torn ACL, and would miss the rest of the season. He finished the season with three assists in 10 games.

Coming off his injury season, Zbořil once again made the opening night roster for the Bruins to start the 2022–23 season, and once again served as the team's seventh defenceman. However, unlike the prior year, he was unable to play himself into a regular role in the lineup. On 12 November 2022, Zbořil scored his first NHL goal in a 3–1 win over the Buffalo Sabres, which ended up being the game-winner. It would be his only goal of the season, and he would add three assists for a total of four points in 22 games during the season.

Zbořil did not make the NHL roster to start the 2023–24 season, and on 7 October 2023, he was waived by the Bruins. After clearing waivers, he reported to Boston's American Hockey League (AHL) affiliate, the Providence Bruins, where he had not played since the 2019–20 season. On 13 December, the Bruins announced that they had placed Zbořil on waivers again in order to accommodate his request to play for another organization. He cleared once again, and continued playing for Providence.

==== Columbus Blue Jackets ====
On 8 March 2024, unable to find success in the Bruins organization, Zbořil was traded along with a 2027 third-round pick to the Columbus Blue Jackets in exchange for Andrew Peeke. He was subsequently assigned the Blue Jackets' AHL affiliate, the Cleveland Monsters.

Remaining unsigned from the Blue Jackets entering the 2024–25 season, Zbořil signed a professional tryout with the New Jersey Devils on September 5, 2024.

Czech Republic

On October 20, 2024, Zbořil signed a five-year contract with HC Dynamo Pardubice of the Czech Extraliga.

Following the season, Zbořil and Pardubice mutually agreed to terminate the remaining four years of their contract and on August 15, 2025, Zbořil signed a one-year deal with rival Extraliga club HC Vítkovice.

== Career statistics ==
=== Regular season and playoffs ===
			Regular season					Playoffs
Season	Team	League	GP	G	A	Pts	PIM	GP	G	A	Pts	PIM
2011–12	HC Kometa Brno	CZE U18	35	2	4	6	69	2	0	0	0	0
2012–13	HC Kometa Brno	CZE U18	27	4	5	9	70	3	0	2	2	8
2013–14	HC Kometa Brno	CZE U18	2	1	1	2	0	10	3	5	8	14
2013–14	HC Kometa Brno	CZE U20	36	5	16	21	57	—	—	—	—	—
2014–15	Saint John Sea Dogs	QMJHL	44	13	20	33	73	5	1	2	3	18
2015–16	Saint John Sea Dogs	QMJHL	50	6	14	20	57	17	2	8	10	6
2016–17	Saint John Sea Dogs	QMJHL	50	9	32	41	44	16	3	4	7	12
2017–18	Providence Bruins	AHL	68	4	15	19	38	4	0	0	0	2
2018–19	Providence Bruins	AHL	56	4	15	19	38	4	0	0	0	0
2018–19	Boston Bruins	NHL	2	0	0	0	0	—	—	—	—	—
2019–20	Providence Bruins	AHL	58	3	16	19	46	—	—	—	—	—
2020–21	HC Kometa Brno	ELH	18	1	7	8	4	—	—	—	—	—
2020–21	Boston Bruins	NHL	42	0	9	9	18	—	—	—	—	—
2021–22	Boston Bruins	NHL	10	0	3	3	4	—	—	—	—	—
2022–23	Boston Bruins	NHL	22	1	3	4	6	—	—	—	—	—
2023–24	Providence Bruins	AHL	31	0	9	9	19	—	—	—	—	—
2023–24	Cleveland Monsters	AHL	15	0	4	4	10	14	1	3	4	18
2024–25	HC Dynamo Pardubice	ELH	30	2	12	14	12	16	0	5	5	4
2025–26	HC Vitkovice	ELH	41	1	9	10	79	—	—	—	—	—
NHL totals			76	1	15	16	28	—	—	—	—	—
ELH totals			89	4	28	32	95	16	0	5	5	4

=== International ===
Medal record

Representing Czech Republic

Ice hockey

IIHF U18 Championships
Silver medal – second place	2014 Finland	

Ivan Hlinka Memorial Tournament
Silver medal – second place	2014 Czech Republic/Slovakia	
Bronze medal – third place	2013 Czech Republic/Slovakia	

Year	Team	Event	Result	GP	G	A	Pts	PIM
2013	Czech Republic	IH18	3rd place, bronze medalist(s)	4	1	1	2	4
2014	Czech Republic	U18	2nd place, silver medalist(s)	7	0	3	3	8
2014	Czech Republic	IH18	2nd place, silver medalist(s)	5	4	2	6	8
2015	Czech Republic	U18	6th	3	1	1	2	4
2016	Czech Republic	WJC	5th	5	0	1	1	31
2017	Czech Republic	WJC	6th	5	0	4	4	10
2023	Czech Republic	WC	8th	8	1	1	2	2
Junior totals				29	6	12	18	65
Senior totals				8	1	1	2	2

== Awards and honours ==
Honours	Year	Ref
QMJHL All-Rookie Team	2015	
President's Cup champion	2017	

Awards and achievements
Preceded by David Pastrňák	Boston Bruins first-round draft pick 2015	Succeeded by Jake DeBrusk
