= Nicolas Roy =

Canadian ice hockey player (born 1997)

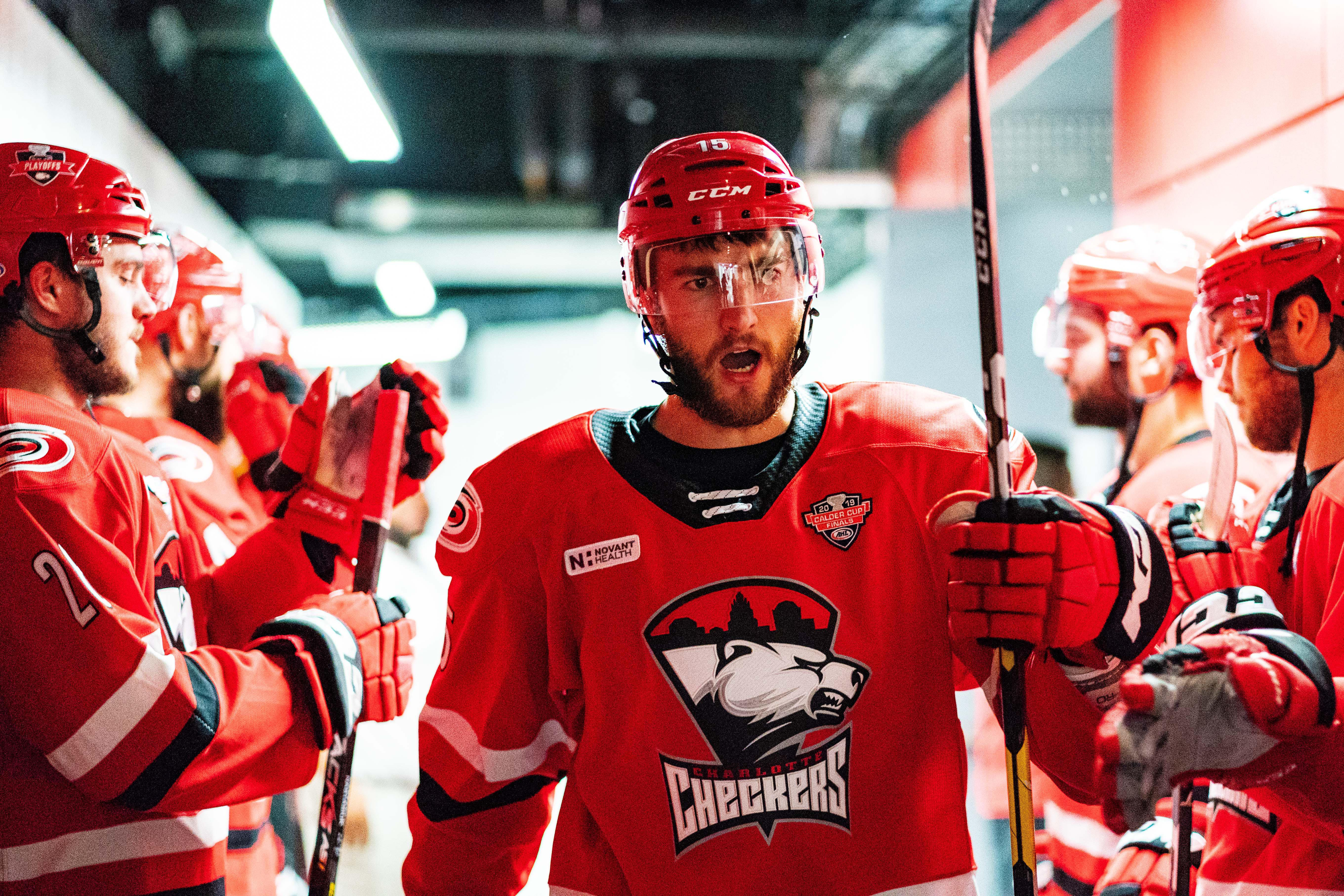
- Roy with the Charlotte Checkers in 2019
- Born: February 5, 1997 (age 29) Amos, Quebec, Canada
- Height: 6 ft 4 in (193 cm)
- Weight: 200 lb (91 kg; 14 st 4 lb)
- Position: Centre
- Shoots: Right
- NHL team Former teams: Colorado Avalanche; Carolina Hurricanes; Vegas Golden Knights; Toronto Maple Leafs
- National team: Canada
- NHL draft: 96th overall, 2015; Carolina Hurricanes
- Playing career: 2016–present

Nicolas Roy (French pronunciation: [ʁwa]; born February 5, 1997) is a Canadian professional ice hockey player who is a centre for the Colorado Avalanche of the National Hockey League (NHL). Roy was drafted by the Carolina Hurricanes, 96th overall, in the 2015 NHL entry draft. Roy won the Stanley Cup with the Vegas Golden Knights in 2023.

Prior to turning professional, Roy had a prolific major junior hockey career with the Chicoutimi Saguenéens. Although he was drafted first overall by the Cape Breton Screaming Eagles at the 2013 Quebec Major Junior Hockey League (QMJHL) entry draft, he refused to play for the league unless his rights were traded to a Quebec-based one.

Internationally, Roy has competed for Canada at the 2014 Ivan Hlinka Memorial Tournament, 2015 IIHF World U18 Championships, and 2017 World Junior Ice Hockey Championships.

== Early life ==
Roy was born on February 5, 1997, in Amos, Quebec, Canada, to parents Nick and Lisa Roy. His sister Mélina is also an ice hockey player and competed for Team Quebec at the 2012 National Women's Under-18 Championship.

== Playing career ==
=== Youth ===
Roy played minor ice hockey for the Rouyn-Noranda Huskies Bantam AA in the MMBAA during the 2010–11 season. He began his Quebec midget AAA hockey career at the age of 14 with the Amos Forestiers. In his rookie season with the team, he played in 43 regular season games as he led the team to the QMAAA quarterfinals. As a result of his play, Roy was invited to attend the Allstate All-Canadians mentorship camp in 2012. He also competed for Team Québec White at the QGC-16 in 2013 and received the QMAAA's Prospect Award.

=== Junior ===
While playing in the QMAAA, Roy was deemed the unanimous first overall pick in the Quebec Major Junior Hockey League (QMJHL) draft. Prior to the QMJHL draft, Roy's father Nick stated that if his son was selected first overall by the Cape Breton Screaming Eagles at the 2013 QMJHL draft, they would pursue other options if his rights were not traded to a Quebec team. One of the reasons for this was because Roy wished to enroll in CEGEP locally. In spite of this, Roy was selected first overall by the Cape Breton Screaming Eagles at the draft but refused to play in the league unless his rights were traded.

On September 6, 2013, the Screaming Eagles caved and traded him to the Chicoutimi Saguenéens in exchange for Chicoutimi’s first round picks in the 2014, 2015 and 2016 QMJHL drafts. As a result of Roy's decision to not play for his draft team, in advance of the 2014 QMJHL Entry Draft, the QMJHL made a rule change concerning the protocol for compensatory draft picks in the event of a non-reporting player.

In his rookie season, Roy was named an assistant captain for the team. where he finished his rookie campaign recording 16 goals and 25 assists in 63 regular season games. His sophomore campaign during the 2014–15 season proved to be more successful than his first as he was selected for the CHL Top Prospects Game and set new career highs in goals, assists, and points.

Leading up to the 2015 NHL entry draft, Roy was ranked 45th among North American skaters by the NHL Central Scouting Bureau. He was eventually taken in the fourth round, 96th overall, by the Carolina Hurricanes. Upon returning to the QMJHL for the 2015–16 season, Roy was appointed the Saguenéens's newest captain to replace Laurent Dauphin. In his first season with the "C," Roy led all QMJHL skaters in goals and recorded a career high 90 points in 63 games. He also led the team to the 2016 QMJHL playoffs, where he recorded seven points in an eventual six game loss in the first round to Cape Breton. At the conclusion of the 2015–16 season, Roy was named to the QMJHL First All-Star Team and signed a three-year, entry-level contract with the Carolina Hurricanes. He subsequently joined the Hurricanes American Hockey League (AHL) affiliate, the Charlotte Checkers, for the remainder of the season.

After playing in two games for the Checkers, Roy returned to his hometown of Amos to spend his summer training with kinesiologist Josianne Domingue. He eventually returned to the QMJHL for the 2016–17 season to complete his major junior career. In his final season, Roy was again named to the QMJHL First All-Star Team and received the league's Guy Carbonneau Trophy. As a result of his academic success while attending Cégep de Chicoutimi, he was also a finalist for the Marcel Robert Trophy, an award given to the best student-athlete in the QMJHL.

=== Professional ===
==== Carolina Hurricanes ====
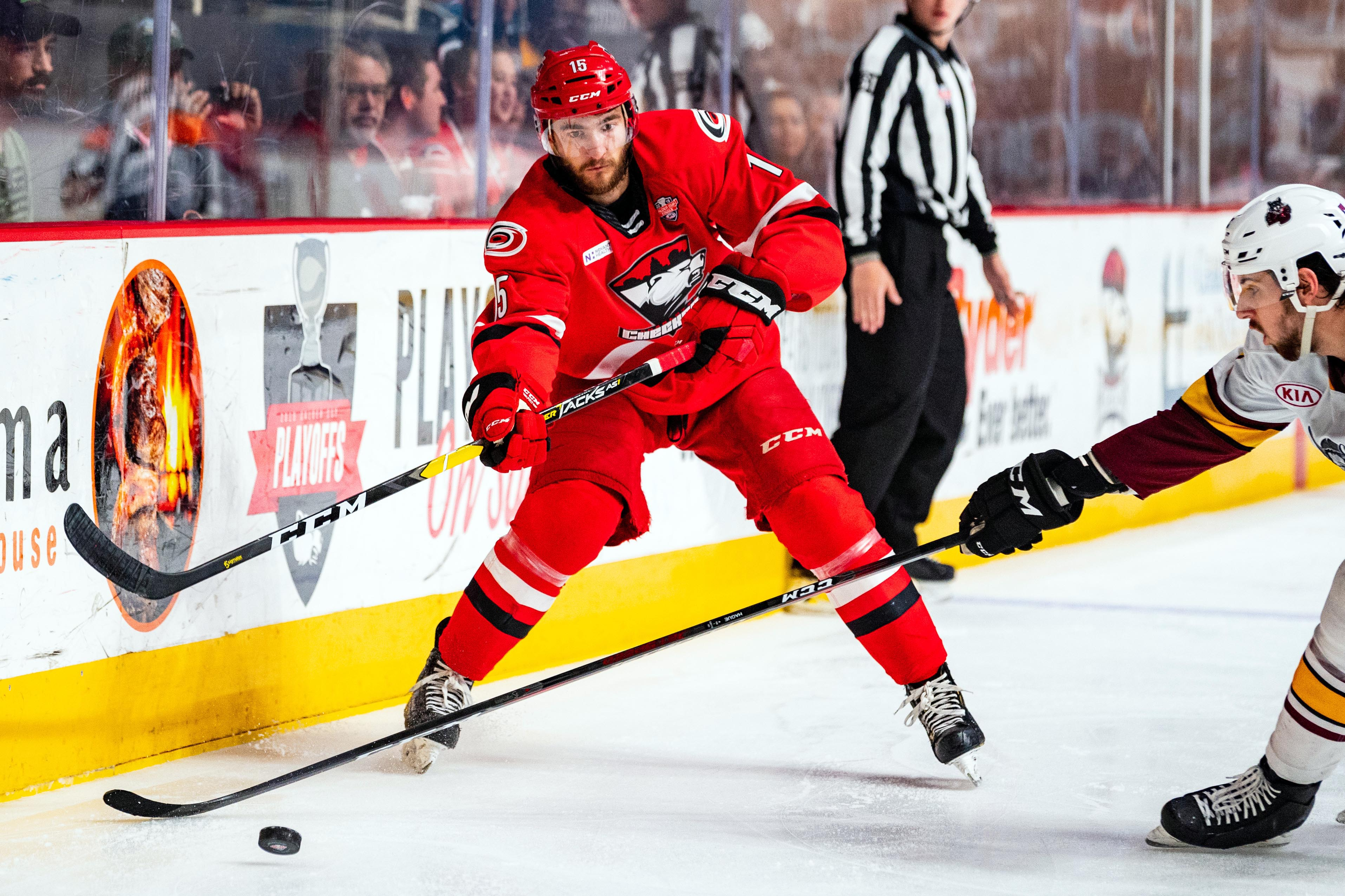
Roy during the 2019 Calder Cup playoffs

Roy attended the Hurricanes training camp prior to the 2017–18 season, but was reassigned to the Checkers alongside Valentin Zykov, Aleksi Saarela, Trevor Carrick, Jake Chelios, and Jeremy Smith. By the conclusion of his rookie campaign, Roy recorded 37 points in 68 games to tie for eighth place among rookies in the AHL. He eventually made his NHL debut on April 7, 2018, in the last game of the Hurricanes season. Roy began the 2018–19 season in the American Hockey League after attending the Hurricanes training camp. With the Checkers, Roy recorded 36 points in 69 games as the team qualified for the 2019 Calder Cup playoffs. In the postseason, Roy recorded 15 points, including six goals, in 19 games to help the Checkers clinch the Cup.

==== Vegas Golden Knights ====
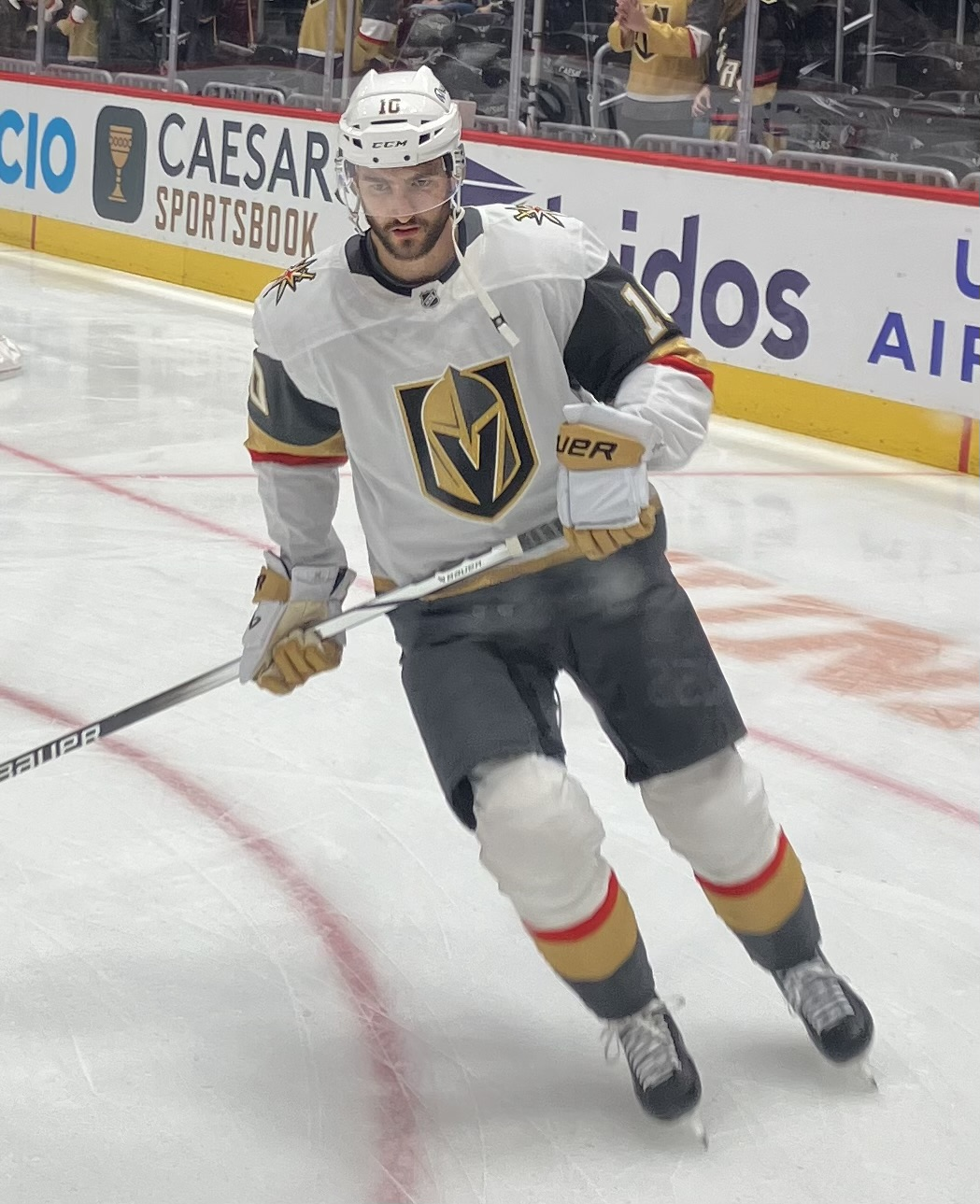
Roy with the Golden Knights in 2024.

On June 26, 2019, Roy was traded by the Hurricanes, along with a conditional 2021 fifth-round pick, to the Vegas Golden Knights in exchange for Erik Haula. He attended their 2019 training camp and played alongside fellow French speaker Jonathan Marchessault, which he said helped him a lot.

During the 2019–20 season, Roy frequently moved between the Golden Knights and their AHL affiliate, the Chicago Wolves, making up 15 of 67 total transactions by December. He recorded his first career NHL goal on October 27, in a 5–2 win over the Anaheim Ducks. His goal, which turned out to be the game-winner, occurred while centering the Knights' fourth line with Ryan Reaves and William Carrier. Later that season, he recorded a goal with an assist from Nick Cousins and Nick Holden, making them the first trio of "Nicks" to combine on a goal. On April 22, 2020, Roy signed a two-year contract extension with the Golden Knights that accounted for $750,000 against the salary cap.

==== Toronto Maple Leafs ====
On July 1, 2025, Roy was traded by Vegas to the Toronto Maple Leafs. In return, the Golden Knights received right winger Mitch Marner as part of a sign-and-trade deal.

==== Colorado Avalanche ====
After only half a season with Toronto, Roy was traded to the Colorado Avalanche on March 5, 2026, in exchange for a conditional first-round draft pick in 2027 and a conditional fifth-round pick in 2026.

== International play ==
Medal record

Representing Canada

Ice hockey

World Championship
Silver medal – second place	2022 Finland	

World Junior Championship
Silver medal – second place	2017 Canada	

World U18 Championship
Bronze medal – third place	2015 Switzerland	

Ivan Hlinka Memorial Tournament
Gold medal – first place	2014 Czech Republic	

Roy's first international campaign is with Team Canada Quebec at the 2014 U17 World Hockey Challenge. He would play for Team Canada in the Hlinka Gretzky Cup, where he won a gold medal.

On April 15, 2015, Roy was named to the Team Canada's final roster prior to the 2015 IIHF World U18 Championship as he helped them claim the bronze medal. He also competed with Team Canada at the 2017 World Junior Ice Hockey Championships where he helped them win a silver medal.

Roy along with Golden Knights teammates Logan Thompson and Zach Whitecloud made their senior debut with Team Canada at the 2022 IIHF World Championship where he scored five points as they claim silver in a 4–3 overtime loss to Finland.

== Career statistics ==
=== Regular season and playoffs ===
			Regular season					Playoffs
Season	Team	League	GP	G	A	Pts	PIM	GP	G	A	Pts	PIM
2013–14	Chicoutimi Saguenéens	QMJHL	63	16	25	41	19	4	0	2	2	8
2014–15	Chicoutimi Saguenéens	QMJHL	68	16	34	50	40	5	2	3	5	8
2015–16	Chicoutimi Saguenéens	QMJHL	63	48	42	90	71	6	3	4	7	16
2015–16	Charlotte Checkers	AHL	2	0	0	0	4	—	—	—	—	—
2016–17	Chicoutimi Saguenéens	QMJHL	53	36	44	80	46	17	8	13	21	14
2017–18	Charlotte Checkers	AHL	70	11	27	38	37	8	0	3	3	2
2017–18	Carolina Hurricanes	NHL	1	0	0	0	0	—	—	—	—	—
2018–19	Charlotte Checkers	AHL	69	17	19	36	28	19	6	9	15	14
2018–19	Carolina Hurricanes	NHL	6	0	0	0	2	—	—	—	—	—
2019–20	Chicago Wolves	AHL	27	7	15	22	10	—	—	—	—	—
2019–20	Vegas Golden Knights	NHL	28	5	5	10	8	20	1	7	8	6
2020–21	Vegas Golden Knights	NHL	50	6	9	15	14	19	4	5	9	8
2021–22	Vegas Golden Knights	NHL	78	15	24	39	51	—	—	—	—	—
2022–23	Vegas Golden Knights	NHL	65	14	16	30	24	22	3	8	11	20
2023–24	Vegas Golden Knights	NHL	70	13	28	41	29	7	0	0	0	4
2024–25	Vegas Golden Knights	NHL	71	15	16	31	43	11	2	2	4	21
2025–26	Toronto Maple Leafs	NHL	59	5	15	20	10	—	—	—	—	—
2025–26	Colorado Avalanche	NHL	15	3	2	5	13	13	3	3	6	4
NHL totals			443	76	115	191	194	92	13	25	38	63

=== International ===
Year	Team	Event	Result	GP	G	A	Pts	PIM
2014	Canada Quebec	U17	4th	6	2	7	9	4
2014	Canada	IH18	1st place, gold medalist(s)	5	1	4	5	2
2015	Canada	U18	3rd place, bronze medalist(s)	7	3	3	6	6
2017	Canada	WJC	2nd place, silver medalist(s)	7	3	1	4	0
2022	Canada	WC	2nd place, silver medalist(s)	10	1	4	5	10
Junior totals				25	9	15	24	12
Senior totals				10	1	4	5	10

== Awards and honours ==
Award	Year
QMAAA
Prospect Award	2013
QMJHL
CHL Top Prospects Game	2015
QMJHL Academic player of the month	February 2015
First All-Star Team	2016, 2017
Guy Carbonneau Trophy	2017
AHL
Calder Cup champion	2019
NHL
Stanley Cup champion	2023
