= Lukáš Doudera =

Czech ice hockey defenceman

Lukas Doudera
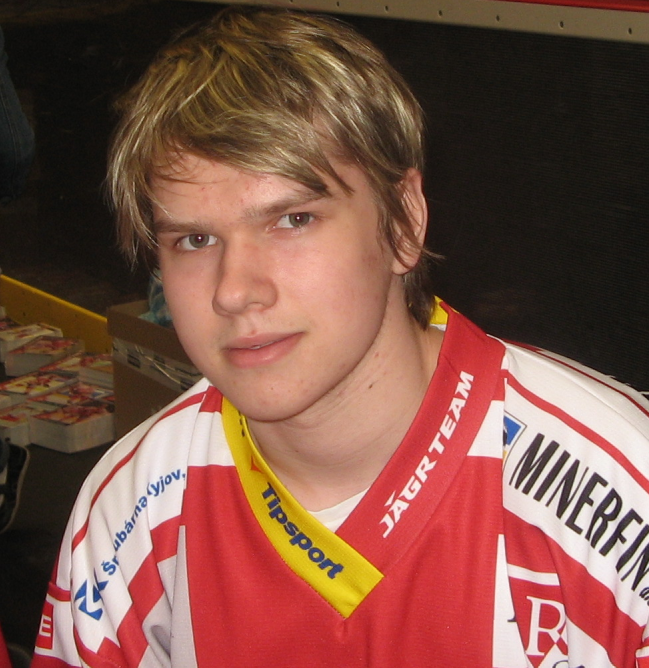
- Born: January 3, 1998 (age 27); Kladno, Czech Republic
- Height: 5 ft 11 in (180 cm)
- Weight: 165 lb (75 kg; 11 st 11 lb)
- Position: Defence
- Shoots: Left
- Czech team Former teams: HC Litvínov; HC Oceláři Třinec
- Playing career: 2015–present

Lukas Doudera (born January 3, 1998) is a Czech ice hockey defenceman. He is currently playing with HC Litvínov of the Czech Extraliga.

Doudera made his Czech Extraliga debut with HC Oceláři Třinec during the 2014–15 Czech Extraliga season and stayed with the club for three seasons.
