= Adam Musil =

Czech ice hockey player

- Born: 26 March 1997 (age 29) Delta, British Columbia, Canada
- Height: 1.91 m (6 ft 3 in)
- Weight: 91.6 kg (202 lb; 14 st 6 lb)
- Position: Centre/Left wing
- Shoots: Right
- ELH team Former teams: Dynamo Pardubice; Chicago Wolves; San Antonio Rampage; Bílí Tygři Liberec
- National team: Czech Republic
- NHL draft: 94th overall, 2015; St. Louis Blues
- Playing career: 2016–present

Adam Musil (born 26 March 1997) is a Czech-Canadian ice hockey player for Dynamo Pardubice and the Czech national team.

He was drafted 94th overall in the 2015 NHL entry draft by the St. Louis Blues, and represented the Czech Republic at the 2021 IIHF World Championship.
