= Daniel Krenželok =

Czech ice hockey player

- Born: 29 July 1997 (age 27); Dolní Lutyně, Czech Republic
- Height: 191 cm (6 ft 3 in)
- Weight: 83 kg (183 lb; 13 st 1 lb)
- Position: Defenceman
- Shoots: Left
- Czech 1.Liga team Former teams: HC Dukla Jihlava; HC Oceláři Třinec; HC Kometa Brno; HC Vítkovice Ridera; Cracovia; Fife Flyers
- Playing career: 2016–present

Daniel Krenželok (born 29 July 1997) is a Czech ice hockey defenceman currently playing for HC Dukla Jihlava of the 1st Czech Republic Hockey League (Czech 1.Liga).
