= Marek Hecl =

Slovak ice hockey player

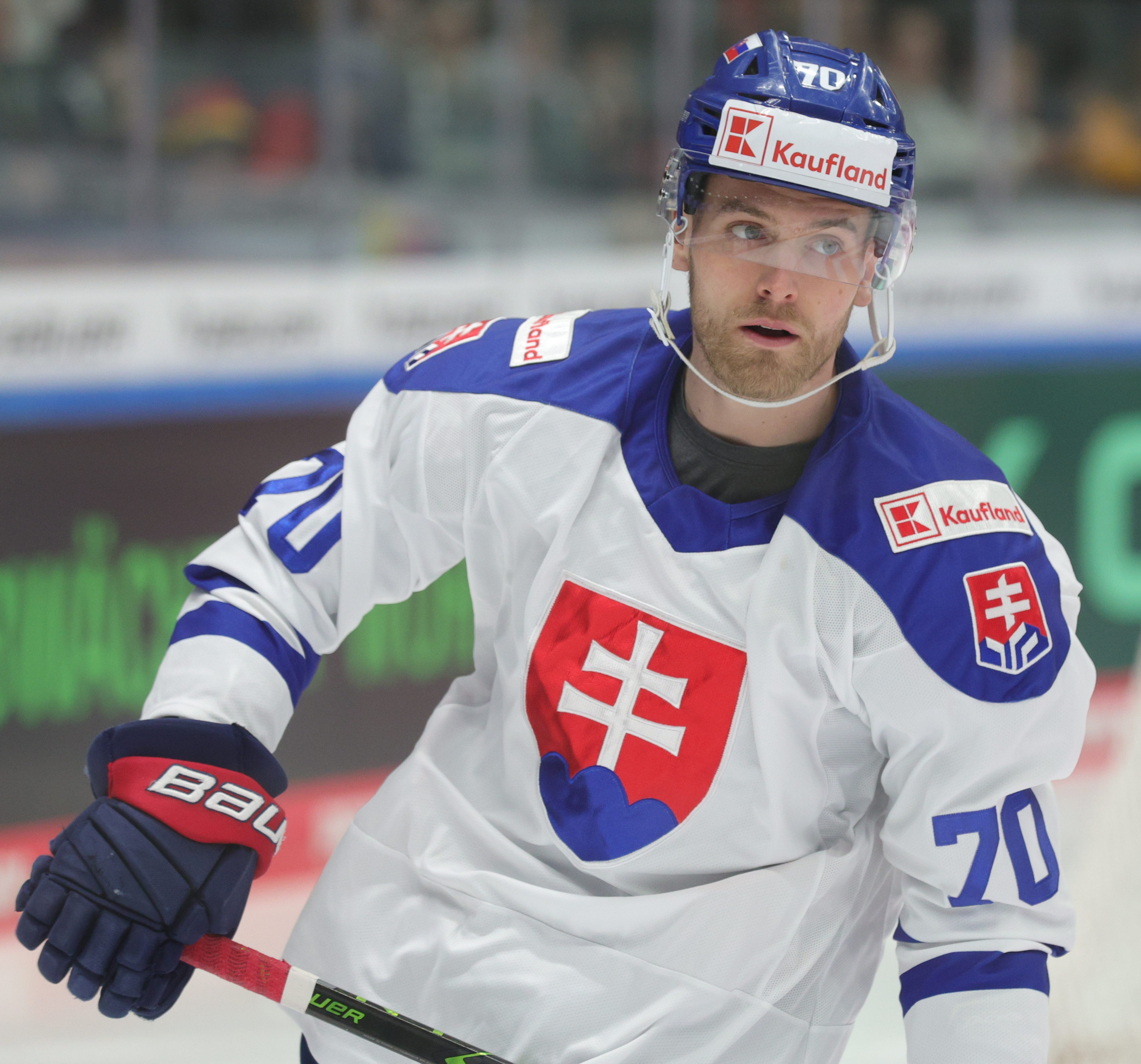
- Marek Hecl, 2024
- Born: 30 December 1997 (age 27); Trenčín, Slovakia
- Height: 5 ft 9 in (175 cm)
- Weight: 168 lb (76 kg; 12 st 0 lb)
- Position: Right wing
- Shoots: Left
- Slovak team Former teams: HKM Zvolen; HK Dukla Trenčín; HK Orange 20; HC Slovan Bratislava; HC Olomouc; HC Dynamo Pardubice; HC Stadion Vrchlabí
- NHL draft: Undrafted
- Playing career: 2016–present

Marek Hecl (born 30 December 1997) is a Slovak professional ice hockey player. He is currently playing for the HKM Zvolen of the Slovak Extraliga.

== Career statistics ==
=== Regular season and playoffs ===
			Regular season					Playoffs
Season	Team	League	GP	G	A	Pts	PIM	GP	G	A	Pts	PIM
KHL totals			23	3	1	4	4	—	—	—	—	—
Czech totals			60	8	8	16	6	2	0	0	0	0
Slovak totals			206	72	57	129	18	16	1	3	4	2
