= Radek Koblížek =

Czech ice hockey player

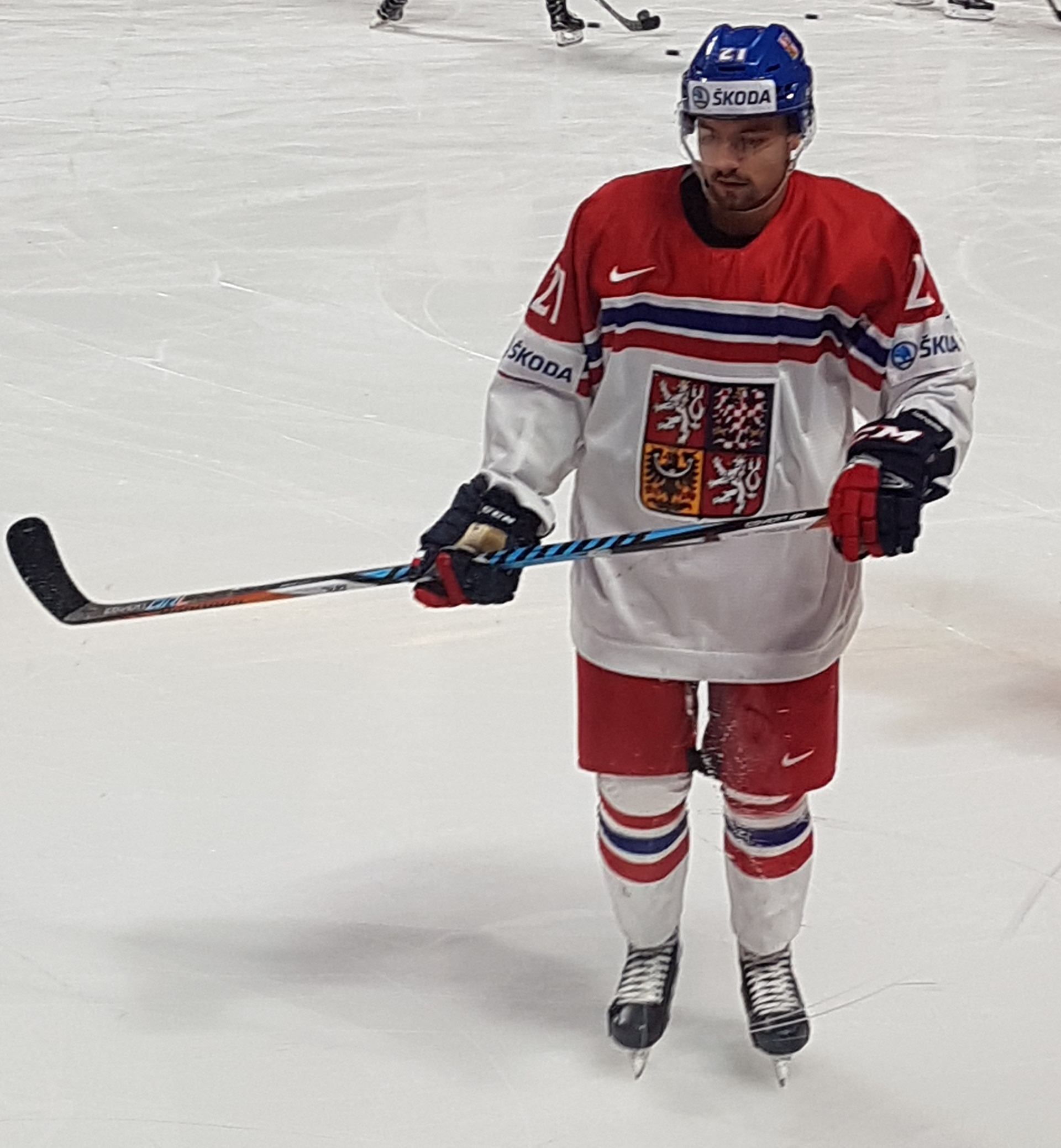
- Koblížek in 2016
- Born: 20 October 1997 (age 28) Ivančice, Czech Republic
- Height: 175 cm (5 ft 9 in)
- Weight: 73 kg (161 lb; 11 st 7 lb)
- Position: Forward
- Shoots: Right
- Liiga team Former teams: KooKoo; Oulun Kärpät; HC Kometa Brno
- Playing career: 2015–present

Radek Koblížek (born 20 October 1997) is a Czech ice hockey forward currently playing for KooKoo of the Finnish Liiga.

Radek Koblížek born in Ivančice (Brno-country district) in the Czech Republic. Koblížek started with hockey, from about 4 years in Rosice u Brna HC Pike Rosice (HC Štika Rosice). After about 4 years, he moved into team, and then joined to HC Kometa Brno.
