= Filip Dvořák (ice hockey, born 1997) =

Czech ice hockey player

- Born: March 9, 1997 (age 28); Brno, Czech Republic
- Height: 6 ft 1 in (185 cm)
- Weight: 180 lb (82 kg; 12 st 12 lb)
- Position: Forward
- Shoots: Right
- Czech 1.liga team Former teams: HC ZUBR Přerov; HC Kometa Brno
- Playing career: 2015–present

Filip Dvořák (born March 9, 1997) is a Czech professional ice hockey player. He is currently playing for HC ZUBR Přerov of the Czech 1.liga.

Dvořák made his Czech Extraliga debut playing with HC Kometa Brno during the 2015-16 Czech Extraliga season.
