= Filip Suchý =

Czech ice hockey player

- Born: 16 December 1997 (age 27); Horni Lukavice, Czech Republic
- Height: 5 ft 8 in (173 cm)
- Weight: 172 lb (78 kg; 12 st 4 lb)
- Position: Forward
- Shoots: Left
- Czech team Former teams: HC Škoda Plzeň; SHC Klatovy; Omaha Lancers; Västerviks IK; Piráti Chomutov
- Playing career: 2015–present

Filip Suchý (born 16 December 1997) is a Czech professional ice hockey player. He is currently playing for HC Škoda Plzeň of the Czech Extraliga.

Suchý made his Czech Extraliga debut playing with HC Plzeň during the 2014–15 Czech Extraliga season.

== Career statistics ==
=== Regular season and playoffs ===
			Regular season					Playoffs
Season	Team	League	GP	G	A	Pts	PIM	GP	G	A	Pts	PIM
