= Jonathan Leman =

Swedish ice hockey player

- Born: April 15, 1997 (age 29) Uppsala, Sweden
- Height: 6 ft 1 in (185 cm)
- Weight: 192 lb (87 kg; 13 st 10 lb)
- Position: Defence
- Shoots: Left
- GET-ligaen team Former teams: Narvik Hockey; Modo Hockey
- Playing career: 2014–present

Jonathan Leman (born April 15, 1997) is a Swedish ice hockey defenceman. He is currently playing with Narvik Hockey of the GET-ligaen.

Leman made his Swedish Hockey League debut playing with Modo Hockey during the 2014–15 SHL season.
