= Emera Centre Northside =

Community recreation facility in Nova Scotia, Canada

- Interactive map of Emera Centre Northside
- Location: 175 King St; North Sydney, Nova Scotia B1P 6R7
- Coordinates: 46.2169°N 60.2676°W
- Owner: CBRM
- Capacity: Hockey: 1,000~ including restaurant: up to 1,300

Construction
- Groundbreaking: 2010
- Opened: 2011

Tenants
- Northside Vikings (NSDMH) (2011–present); Joneljim Cougars (NSMBHL) (2011–Present); Memorial Marauders (CBHSHL)(2011-Present)

Emera Centre Northside is a community recreation facility, located in North Sydney, Nova Scotia. It hosts the Northside & District Minor Hockey Association and many other hockey teams. The facility includes an NHL-size ice surface arena with seating for 1,000 people, an elevated indoor mondo-flex covered 1/8 mile walking track, and convention and meeting rooms.

== History ==
In February 1999 the Department of Labour temporarily closed the North Sydney Forum. As a result of that one action, a diverse group of Northside area residents and business people came together to build a new arena. The result is the Northside Civic Centre Society and the facility itself, the Emera Centre Northside.

=== Notable events ===
In December 2013-January 2014, the Emera Centre Northside was one of the host arenas for 2014 World U-17 Hockey Challenge. Team USA went on to win the tournament 4-0 against team Pacific.
