= 2014 World U-17 Hockey Challenge (January) =

Tournament details
- Host country: Canada
- Venue(s): Centre 200, Emera Centre Northside, Civic Centre (in Sydney, Nova Scotia & North Sydney, Nova Scotia 2 host cities)
- Dates: December 29 – January 4
- Teams: 10

The 2014 World Under-17 Hockey Challenge was an ice hockey tournament held in Sydney, North Sydney and Port Hawkesbury, Nova Scotia, Canada between December 29, 2013 and January 4, 2014. The World Under-17 Hockey Challenge is held by Hockey Canada annually to showcase young hockey talent from across Canada and other strong hockey countries. The primary venues used for the tournament are the Centre 200 and the Emera Centre Northside in Sydney and the Civic Centre in Port Hawkesbury.

== Challenge results ==
=== Preliminary round ===
==== Group A ====
Team	Pld	W	OTW	OTL	L	GF	GA	GD	Pts
Canada Pacific	4	3	0	0	1	16	9	+7	9
Canada Quebec	4	2	0	1	1	11	12	−1	7
Sweden	4	1	1	1	1	9	9	0	6
Czech Republic	4	2	0	0	2	12	10	+2	6
Canada West	4	0	1	0	3	9	17	−8	2

===== Results =====
December 29, 2013	Czech Republic	1 – 3	Sweden	Emera Centre Northside, North Sydney, Nova Scotia

December 29, 2013	Canada Quebec	4 – 3	Canada Pacific	Emera Centre Northside, North Sydney, Nova Scotia

December 30, 2013	Czech Republic	5 – 1	Canada Quebec	Centre 200, Sydney

December 30, 2013	Canada Pacific	6 – 3	Canada West	Emera Centre Northside, North Sydney, Nova Scotia

December 31, 2013	Canada West	2 – 5	Czech Republic	Emera Centre Northside, North Sydney, Nova Scotia

December 31, 2013	Canada Quebec	2 – 3 GWS	Sweden	Emera Centre Northside, North Sydney, Nova Scotia

January 1, 2014	Sweden	2 – 3 GWS	Canada West	Emera Centre Northside, North Sydney, Nova Scotia

January 1, 2014	Canada Pacific	4 – 1	Czech Republic	Emera Centre Northside, North Sydney, Nova Scotia

January 2, 2014	Canada West	1 – 4	Canada Quebec	Emera Centre Northside, North Sydney, Nova Scotia

January 2, 2014	Sweden	1 – 3	Canada Pacific	Emera Centre Northside, North Sydney, Nova Scotia

==== Group B ====
Team	Pld	W	OTW	OTL	L	GF	GA	GD	Pts
United States	4	4	0	0	0	34	5	+29	12
Russia	4	2	1	0	1	19	15	+4	8
Canada Ontario	4	2	0	1	1	20	14	+6	7
Canada Atlantic	4	1	0	0	3	9	22	−13	3
Germany	4	0	0	0	4	7	33	−26	0

===== Results =====
December 29, 2013	Canada Ontario	8 – 1	Germany	Centre 200, Sydney

December 29, 2013	Russia	1 – 5	United States	Civic Centre, Port Hawkesbury

December 30, 2013	United States	14 – 1	Germany	Emera Centre Northside, North Sydney, Nova Scotia

December 30, 2013	Canada Ontario	5 – 1	Canada Atlantic	Centre 200, Sydney

December 31, 2013	Germany	2 – 7	Russia	Civic Centre, Port Hawkesbury

December 31, 2013	Canada Atlantic	1 – 9	United States	Centre 200, Sydney

January 1, 2014	Germany	3 – 4	Canada Atlantic	Centre 200, Sydney

January 1, 2014	Russia	6 – 5 GWS	Canada Ontario	Centre 200, Sydney

January 2, 2014	Canada Atlantic	3 – 5	Russia	Centre 200, Sydney

January 2, 2014	United States	6 – 2	Canada Ontario	Centre 200, Sydney

=== Final round ===
Semifinals
A1	Canada Pacific	7
B2	Russia	3
B1	United States	9
A2	Canada Quebec	1

Final
SF1	Canada Pacific	0
SF2	United States	4

==== Semifinals ====
January 3, 2014	Canada Pacific	7 – 3	Russia	Emera Centre Northside, North Sydney, Nova Scotia

January 3, 2014	United States	9 – 1	Canada Quebec	Centre 200, Sydney

==== 9th place game ====
January 3, 2014	Canada West	4 – 3	Germany	Civic Centre, Port Hawkesbury

==== 7th place game ====
January 3, 2014	Czech Republic	3 – 2	Canada Atlantic	Civic Centre, Port Hawkesbury

==== 5th place game ====
January 3, 2014	Canada Ontario	6 – 3	Sweden	Emera Centre Northside, North Sydney, Nova Scotia

==== Bronze medal game ====
January 4, 2014	Russia	6 – 2	Canada Quebec	Centre 200, Sydney

==== Gold medal game ====
January 4, 2014	United States	4 – 0	Canada Pacific	Centre 200, Sydney

== Final standings ==
	Team
1st place, gold medalist(s)	United States
2nd place, silver medalist(s)	Canada Pacific
3rd place, bronze medalist(s)	Russia
4	Canada Quebec
5	Canada Ontario
6	Sweden
7	Czech Republic
8	Canada Atlantic
9	Canada West
10	Germany

== Statistics ==
=== Scoring leaders ===
Player	Country	GP	G	A	Pts	PIM
Colin White	United States	6	10	8	18	4
Luke Kirwan	United States	6	7	6	13	8
Artur Tyanulin	Russia	6	7	5	12	10
Dylan Strome	Canada Ontario	5	6	5	11	0
Jeremy Bracco	United States	6	3	8	11	4
Dmitry Zhukenov	Russia	6	3	7	10	4
Nicolas Roy	Canada Quebec	6	2	7	9	4
Mitch Marner	Canada Ontario	5	6	3	9	2
Auston Matthews	United States	6	4	4	8	8
Matteo Gennaro	Canada Pacific	6	4	3	7	4

=== Goaltending leaders ===
(Minimum 60 minutes played)

Player	Country	MINS	GA	Sv%	GAA	SO
Michael Lackey	United States	240:00	3	.958	0.75	1
Ales Stezka	Czech Republic	120:00	3	.943	1.50	0
Daniel Vladař	Czech Republic	177:00	7	.937	2.37	0
Zach Sawchenko	Canada Pacific	300:00	12	.929	2.40	0
Felix Sandström	Sweden	244:04	12	.928	2.95	0

== See also ==
World U-17 Hockey Challenge

- 2014 IIHF World U18 Championships
- 2014 World Junior Ice Hockey Championships

Emera Centre Northside
