= 2015 IIHF World U18 Championships =

2015 IIHF U18 World Championship

Tournament details
- Host country: Switzerland
- Venues: 2 (in 2 host cities)
- Dates: 16–26 April 2015
- Teams: 10

Final positions
- Champions: United States (9th title)
- Runners-up: Finland
- Third place: Canada

Tournament statistics
- Games played: 30
- Goals scored: 211 (7.03 per game)
- Attendance: 48,622 (1,621 per game)
- Scoring leader: (United States) Auston Matthews (14 points)

Awards
- MVP: (United States) Auston Matthews

Official website
- http://u18worlds2015.iihf.com/

The 2015 IIHF U18 World Championship was the 17th IIHF World U18 Championship, and was hosted by Zug and Lucerne, Switzerland. The tournament began on 16 April 2015, with the gold medal game played on 26 April 2015.

== Top Division ==
=== Officials ===
The IIHF selected 12 referees and 10 linesmen to work the 2015 IIHF U18 World Championship.
They were the following:

Referees

- (France) Jimmy Bergamelli
- (Sweden) Andreas Harnebring
- (Canada) Brett Iverson
- (Switzerland) Andreas Koch
- (Finland) Petri Lindqvist
- (Slovakia) Robert Mullner
- (Russia) Yuri Oskirko
- (Czech Republic) Vladimír Pešina
- (United States) Christopher Pitoscia
- (Germany) Marian Rohatsch
- (Austria) Ladislav Smetana
- (Norway) Per Gustav Solem

Linesmen

- (Germany) Markku Buese
- (Switzerland) Franco Espinoza
- (Czech Republic) Jiří Gebauer
- (Slovakia) Martin Korba
- (Sweden) Ludvig Lundgren
- (United States) Brian Oliver
- (Russia) Alexander Otmakhov
- (Canada) Nicolas Piche
- (Finland) Hannu Sormunen
- (Switzerland) Michael Tscherrig

=== Preliminary round ===
==== Group A ====
Pos	Team	Pld	W	OTW	OTL	L	GF	GA	GD	Pts	Qualification
1	Russia	4	4	0	0	0	20	7	+13	12	Quarterfinals
2	United States	4	3	0	0	1	30	8	+22	9	Quarterfinals
3	Slovakia	4	1	1	0	2	9	18	−9	5	Quarterfinals
4	Sweden	4	1	0	0	3	16	17	−1	3	Quarterfinals
5	Germany	4	0	0	1	3	5	30	−25	1	Relegation round

Source: IIHF

All times are local. (Central European Summer Time – UTC+02:00)

16 April 2015; 14:45	Sweden	1–3 (0–0, 0–1, 1–2)	Slovakia	Ice Center Lucerne; Attendance: 460

Game reference

Felix Sandström
Goalies
Adam Húska
Referees:
(France) Jimmy Bergamelli
(Russia) Yuriy Oskirko
Linesmen:
(Switzerland) Franco Espinoza
(Czech Republic) Jiří Gebauer

	0–1	37:39 – Solenský (Horvath)
Eriksson Ek (Asplund, Ahl) (PP) – 45:02	1–1
	1–2	56:00 – Hecl (Sádecký)
	1–3	59:41 – Lešťan (Bondra, Valent) (ENG)

8 min
Penalties
8 min
37
Shots
25

16 April 2015; 18:45	Russia	3–1 (0–1, 2–0, 1–0)	United States	Ice Center Lucerne; Attendance: 925

Game reference

Ilya Samsonov
Goalies
Luke Opilka
Referees:
(Switzerland) Andreas Koch
(Slovakia) Robert Mullner
Linesmen:
(Sweden) Ludvig Lundgren
(Finland) Hannu Sormunen

	0–1	07:15 – Terry
Guryanov (Vorobyev) (SH) – 23:09	1–1
Zhukenov (Sokolov, Kaprizov) (PP) – 27:37	2–1
Sokolov (ENG) – 59:36	3–1

12 min
Penalties
6 min
16
Shots
50

17 April 2015; 14:45	Slovakia	0–10 (0–4, 0–6, 0–0)	United States	Ice Center Lucerne; Attendance: 290

Game reference

Adam Húska
Vladimír Cibulka
Goalies
Evan Sarthou
Referees:
(Sweden) Andreas Harnebring
(Finland) Petri Lindqvist
Linesmen:
(Russia) Alexander Otmakhov
(Switzerland) Michael Tscherrig

0–1	01:09 – Terry (Floodstrand, Warren)
0–2	10:47 – Tkachuk (Roslovic, Matthews) (PP)
0–3	14:20 – Roslovic (Tkachuk, Matthews) (PP)
0–4	18:17 – Roslovic (Matthews, McAvoy)
0–5	20:28 – Matthews (Tkachuk, Krys)
0–6	24:49 – Matthews (Floodstrand, Tkachuk)
0–7	26:21 – Bracco (Terry, Masonius)
0–8	28:46 – Fitzgerald (Tkachuk, Roslovic)
0–9	29:46 – Kunin (Fischer, Greenway)
0–10	30:27 – Warren (Floodstrand, Fitzgerald)

8 min
Penalties
4 min
15
Shots
44

17 April 2015; 18:45	Russia	6–0 (2–0, 3–0, 1–0)	Germany	Ice Center Lucerne; Attendance: 362

Game reference

Anton Krasotkin
Goalies
Mirko Pantkowski
Patrick Berger
Referees:
(Canada) Brett Iverson
(Czech Republic) Vladimír Pešina
Linesmen:
(Switzerland) Franco Espinoza
(Slovakia) Martin Korba

Yurtaikin (Sidorov) – 06:59	1–0
Guryanov (Vorobyev) – 11:05	2–0
Barabanov – 20:33	3–0
Ivanyuzhenkov (Yemets) – 24:58	4–0
Yemets (Zhukenov, Sokolov) – 36:28	5–0
Kaprizov (Yakovenko, Sokolov) – 54:01	6–0

8 min
Penalties
10 min
38
Shots
33

18 April 2015; 17:00	Germany	1–7 (0–1, 0–5, 1–1)	Sweden	Ice Center Lucerne; Attendance: 532

Game reference

Mirko Pantkowski
Patrick Berger
Goalies
Felix Sandström
Referees:
(Switzerland) Andreas Koch
(Finland) Petri Lindqvist
Linesmen:
(United States) Brian Oliver
(Canada) Nicolas Piche

	0–1	Ohlsson – 08:58
	0–2	Ohlsson (Dahlström, Grundström) – 24:18
	0–3	Eriksson Ek (Lindgren, L. Carlsson) (PP) – 26:24
	0–4	Asplund (Kylington, Erikson) – 29:32 (PP)
	0–5	Eriksson Ek (Ahl, Kylington) – 36:42
	0–6	Ohlsson (Dahlén, Ölund) (PP) – 38:29
Eder (Spitzner)	1–6
	1–7	Grundström (PS) – 49:00

14 min
Penalties
4 min
32
Shots
48

19 April 2015; 13:00	Slovakia	2–4 (1–2, 0–1, 1–1)	Russia	Ice Center Lucerne; Attendance: 660

Game reference

Adam Húska
Goalies
Ilya Samsonov
Referees:
(Czech Republic) Vladimír Pešina
(Norway) Per Gustav Solem
Linesmen:
(Finland) Markku Buese
(Switzerland) Franco Espinoza

	0–1	05:25 – Rubtsov (Ivanyuzhenkov)
	0–2	06:54 – Guryanov (Kaprizov, Vorobyev)
Horvath (Solenský) – 17:25	1–2
	1–3	23:10 – Zhukenov (Belyayev, Kaprizov)
Lešťan (Vadovic, Valent) – 48:26	2–3
	2–4	53:57 – Yurtaikin (Kvartalnov, Sidorov)

8 min
Penalties
10 min
36
Shots
35

19 April 2015; 17:00	United States	6–4 (1–1, 2–2, 3–1)	Sweden	Ice Center Lucerne; Attendance: 1,222

Game reference

Luke Opilka
Goalies
Felix Sandström
Referees:
(Canada) Brett Iverson
(Germany) Marian Rohatsch
Linesmen:
(Canada) Nicolas Piche
(Switzerland) Michael Tscherrig

	0–1	04:48 – Grundström (Larsson, Ohlsson)
Keller (White) – 05:22	1–1
Fischer (Keller, McAvoy) (PP) – 33:03	2–1
	2–2	36:49 – Eriksson Ek (Asplund, Ahl) (PP)
White (Bracco, Greenway) – 37:56	3–2
	3–3	39:21 – Dahlén (Larsson, Ölund)
Keller (White, Bracco) – 43:45	4–3
	4–4	50:35 – Asplund (Dahlén, Ölund)
Matthews (Fitzgerald) – 51:43	5–4
Krys (Fischer, Keller) (ENG) – 59:59	6–4

8 min
Penalties
20 min
53
Shots
18

20 April 2015; 18:45	Germany	3–4 GWS (1–0, 1–1, 1–2) (OT (0–0) (SO: 0–1)	Slovakia	Ice Center Lucerne; Attendance: 332

Game reference

Patrick Berger
Goalies
Adam Húska
Referees:
(United States) Christopher Pitoscia
(Norway) Per Gustav Solem
Linesmen:
(United States) Brian Oliver
(Switzerland) Michael Tscherrig

Eder (Mayenschein) (PP) – 07:51	1–0
	1–1	20:25 – Bondra (Valent) (PP)
Mayenschein (Napravnik) – 34:06	2–1
	2–2	42:59 – Andrisik (Bondra)
	2–3	51:17 – Valent (Bondra, Andrisik)
Kalble – 55:20	3–3

Napravnik (miss)
Eder (miss)
Drews (miss)
Shootout
(miss) Žitný
Solenský
(miss) Murin
4 min
Penalties
6 min
42
Shots
23

21 April 2015; 14:45	United States	13–1 (4–0, 5–1, 3–0)	Germany	Ice Center Lucerne; Attendance: 317

Game reference

Evan Sarthou
Goalies
Mirko Pantkowski
Patrick Berger
Referees:
(Slovakia) Robert Mullner
(Russia) Yuriy Oskirko
Linesmen:
(Switzerland) Franco Espinoza
(Finland) Hannu Sormunen

Roslovic (Matthews, Jones) – 07:23	1–0
Kunin (Boka) – 10:32	2–0
Roslovic (Matthews, Tkachuk) (PP) – 12:34	3–0
Tkachuk (Matthews, Roslovic) – 13:19	4–0
	4–1	22:56 – Schutz (Glassl, Daubner) (PP)
White (Fischer, Bracco) (PP) – 26:39	5–1
Kunin (McAvoy, Bracco) – 30:12	6–1
Terry (Jones, Fischer) (PP) – 30:42	7–1
Boka (Bracco, Jones) – 34:45	8–1
Kunin (Greenway) (SH) – 38:13	9–1
Bracco (Floodstrand, Keller) – 44:51	10–1
Matthews (Krys) – 47:58	11–1
Warren (Greenway, Thompson) – 51:47	12–1
Roslovic (Tkachuk) – 52:32	13–1

10 min
Penalties
10 min
49
Shots
15

21 April 2015; 18:45	Sweden	4–7 (2–1, 1–2, 1–3)	Russia	Ice Center Lucerne; Attendance: 732

Game reference

Daniel Marmenlind
Goalies
Anton Krasotkin
Referees:
(Finland) Petri Lindqvist
(United States) Christopher Pitoscia
Linesmen:
(Slovakia) Martin Korba
(United States) Brian Oliver

	0–1	00:17 – Vorobyev (Yurtaikin, Guryanov)
Lindgren (Asplund) – 00:46	1–1
Lindström (Younan, Davidsson) – 11:58	2–1
Ölund (Dahlén) (PP) – 22:02	3–1
	3–2	29:13 – Guryanov (SH)
	3–3	37:22 – Zhukenov (Yurtaikin)
Olhaver (Larsson, Dahlén) – 42:06	4–3
	4–4	48:43 – Guryanov (Yakovenko, Zhukenov) (PP)
	4–5	52:41 – Sokolov (Zhukenov, Yurtaikin)
	4–6	53:33 – Ivanyuzhenkov (Yemets)
	4–7	57:17 – Guryanov (SH, ENG)

12 min
Penalties
20 min
52
Shots
36

==== Group B ====
Pos	Team	Pld	W	OTW	OTL	L	GF	GA	GD	Pts	Qualification
1	Canada	4	4	0	0	0	21	11	+10	12	Quarterfinals
2	Finland	4	3	0	0	1	14	6	+8	9	Quarterfinals
3	Czech Republic	4	2	0	0	2	12	10	+2	6	Quarterfinals
4	Switzerland	4	0	1	0	3	5	14	−9	2	Quarterfinals
5	Latvia	4	0	0	1	3	10	21	−11	1	Relegation round

Source: IIHF

All times are local. (Central European Summer Time – UTC+02:00)

16 April 2015; 15:45	Canada	11–6 (2–3, 6–0, 3–3)	Latvia	Bossard Arena, Zug; Attendance: 170

Game reference

Zach Sawchenko
Goalies
Denijs Romanovskis
Marek Mitens
Referees:
(Czech Republic) Vladimír Pešina
(Norway) Per Gustav Solem
Linesmen:
(United States) Brian Oliver
(Russia) Alexander Otmakhov

	0–1	10:17 – Zile (Cukste, Dzierkals) (PP)
N. Roy (Gawdin) – 11:57	1–1
	1–2	14:40 – Priede (Tralmaks) (SH)
J. Roy (Stephens) – 17:04	2–2
	2–3	17:14 – Bernhards (Blugers)
Howden (Benson, Spencer) – 23:05	3–3
Harkins (Benson, Wotherspoon) – 24:14	4–3
J. Roy (Barzal) – 26:09	5–3
Stephens (Benson) – 26:22	6–3
Capobianco (Spencer) – 27:20	7–3
Brisebois – 29:54	8–3
	8–4	41:06 – Buncis (Zile) (PP)
J. Roy (Barzal) (PP) – 43:42	9–4
Stephens (Beauvillier, Barzal) – 46:46	10–4
N. Roy (Wotherspoon) – 49:55	11–4
	11–5	50:39 – Cukste (Buncis) (PP)
	11–6	56:02 – Tralmaks (SH)

16 min
Penalties
10 min
44
Shots
22

16 April 2015; 19:45	Finland	6–1 (1–1, 3–0, 2–0)	Czech Republic	Bossard Arena, Zug; Attendance: 315

Game reference

Veini Vehvilainen
Goalies
Daniel Vladař
Referees:
(Germany) Marian Rohatsch
(Germany) Ladislav Smetana
Linesmen:
(Slovakia) Martin Korba
(Switzerland) Michael Tscherrig

Niemelä (Tavernier) (PP) – 08:50	1–0
	1–1	10:27 – Hájek (Zbořil, Kobližek)
Saarijärvi (Nättinen, Laine) (PP) – 23:05	2–1
Laine (Puljujärvi) – 25:25	3–1
Saarijärvi (Nättinen, Palmu) (PP) – 27:36	4–1
Tammela (Saarijärvi, Laine) (PP) – 42:25	5–1
Palmu (Tammela, Laine) (PP) – 46:35	6–1

14 min
Penalties
30 min
43
Shots
27

17 April 2015; 15:45	Latvia	1–4 (0–1, 1–1, 0–2)	Czech Republic	Bossard Arena, Zug; Attendance: 721

Game reference

Mareks Mitens
Goalies
Daniel Vladař
Referees:
(Switzerland) Andreas Koch
(Germany) Marian Rohatsch
Linesmen:
(Finland) Markku Buese
(Finland) Hannu Sormunen

	0–1	04:05 – Kaše (Špaček, Hronek)
	0–2	24:56 – Zacha (Krenzelok) (PP)
Dzierkals (Zohovs, Baranovskis) – 35:47	1–2
	1–3	50:25 – Anděl (Špaček, Kaše)
	1–4	59:07 – Zacha (Špaček) (ENG)

37 min
Penalties
14 min
33
Shots
47

17 April 2015; 19:45	Finland	3–1 (1–1, 1–0, 1–0)	Switzerland	Bossard Arena, Zug; Attendance: 3,370

Game reference

Veini Vehvilainen
Goalies
Joren van Pottelberghe
Referees:
(Slovakia) Robert Mullner
(United States) Christopher Pitoscia
Linesmen:
(Czech Republic) Jiří Gebauer
(Canada) Nicolas Piche

Puljujärvi (Laine, Välimäki) – 06:22	1–0
	1–1	13:07 – Malgin
Laine (Saarijärvi) (PP) – 21:15	2–1
Saarijärvi (Saarela) – 51:53	3–1

8 min
Penalties
20 min
26
Shots
23

18 April 2015; 18:45	Switzerland	1–4 (0–1, 1–2, 0–1)	Canada	Bossard Arena, Zug; Attendance: 5,277

Game reference

Joren van Pottelberghe
Goalies
Evan Cormier
Referees:
(France) Jimmy Bergamelli
(Russia) Yuriy Oskirko
Linesmen:
(Finland) Markku Buese
(Sweden) Ludvig Lundgren

	0–1	04:00 – Barzal (Stephens, Chabot) (PP)
	0–2	22:58 – Barzal
	0–3	29:59 – N. Roy (Harkins, Wotherspoon) (PP)
Diem (Malgin, Siegenthaler) (PP) – 38:21	1–3
	1–4	40:30 – Beauvillier (Stephens, Barzal) (PP)

16 min
Penalties
20 min
20
Shots
29

19 April 2015; 14:45	Latvia	1–3 (1–0, 0–2, 0–1)	Finland	Bossard Arena, Zug; Attendance: 363

Game reference

Gustavs Grigals
Denis Romanovskis
Goalies
Veini Vehvilainen
Referees:
(France) Jimmy Bergamelli
(Sweden) Andreas Harnebring
Linesmen:
(Czech Republic) Jiří Gebauer
(Slovakia) Martin Korba

Puide (Priede, Tralmaks) – 13:56	1–0
	1–1	28:40 – Nättinen (Tammela, Saarijärvi) (PP)
	1–2	35:44 – Laine (Tammela, Saarijärvi) (PP)
	1–3	46:42 – Laine (Saarijärvi, Saarela)

14 min
Penalties
16 min
32
Shots
29

19 April 2015; 18:45	Czech Republic	2–3 (1–1, 1–1, 0–1)	Canada	Bossard Arena, Zug; Attendance: 749

Game reference

Aleš Stezka
Goalies
Zach Sawchenko
Referees:
(United States) Christopher Pitoscia
(Germany) Ladislav Smetana
Linesmen:
(Russia) Alexander Otmakhov
(Finland) Hannu Sormunen

Zacha (Svoboda) – 06:21	1–0
	1–1	16:04 – Wotherspoon (Dubois, Bear)
	1–2	25:57 – Beauvillier (Barzal, Stephens)
Koblizek – 33:06	2–2
	2–3	44:21 – Beauvillier (Barzal, Chabot) (PP)

8 min
Penalties
6 min
45
Shots
39

20 April 2015; 19:45	Switzerland	3–2 OT (0–0, 1–1, 1–1) (OT 1–0)	Latvia	Bossard Arena, Zug; Attendance: 2,561

Game reference

Joren van Pottelberghe
Goalies
Denijs Romanovskis
Referees:
(Canada) Brett Iverson
(Germany) Ladislav Smetana
Linesmen:
(Czech Republic) Jiří Gebauer
(Sweden) Ludvig Lundgren

Thurkauf – 22:57	1–0
	1–1	25:09 – Balcers (Dzierkals) (PP)
Fuchs (EA) – 41:34	2–1
	2–2	44:25 – Balcers (Dzierkals)
Malgin (Riat) (PP) – 63:42	3–2

10 min
Penalties
20 min
45
Shots
25

21 April 2015; 15:45	Canada	3–2 (0–2, 3–0, 0–0)	Finland	Bossard Arena, Zug; Attendance: 1133

Game reference

Evan Cormier
Goalies
Veini Vehvilainen
Referees:
(Sweden) Andreas Harnebring
(Czech Republic) Vladimír Pešina
Linesmen:
(Sweden) Ludvig Lundgren
(Russia) Alexander Otmakhov

Barzal (Chabot) (PP) – 29:49	1–0
Chabot (Barzal) (PP) – 30:55	2–0
	2–1	09:03 – Saarela (Saarijärvi, Petrus Palmu) (EA)
	2–2	19:32 – Laine (Puljujärvi, Saarela)
Benson (Gawdin) – 36:21	3–2

12 min
Penalties
10 min
35
Shots
33

21 April 2015; 19:45	Czech Republic	5–0 (2–0, 2–0, 1–0)	Switzerland	Bossard Arena, Zug; Attendance: 2,468

Game reference

Daniel Vladař
Goalies
Joren van Pottelberghe
Referees:
(Canada) Brett Iverson
(Norway) Per Gustav Solem
Linesmen:
(Finland) Markku Buese
(Canada) Nicolas Piche

Kaše (Zbořil) – 15:25	1–0
Špaček (Kaše) – 17:13	2–0
Zacha (Špaček) – 28:58	3–0
Zbořil – 33:05	4–0
Suchý (Hronek) (PP) – 59:27	5–0

18 min
Penalties
10 min
32
Shots
20

=== Relegation round ===
The last-placed teams played a best-of-three series.

23 April 2015; 12:15	Latvia	5–3 (3–1, 1–0, 1–2)	Germany	Bossard Arena, Zug; Attendance: 276

Game reference

Mareks Mitens
Goalies
Patrick Berger
Mirko Pantkowski
Referees:
(Canada) Brett Iverson
(United States) Christopher Pitoscia
Linesmen:
(Sweden) Ludvig Lundgren
(Finland) Hannu Sormunen

	0–1	01:01 – Kiefersauer (Eder)
Dzierkals (Buncis, Balcers) – 04:32	1–1
Čukste (Balcers, Dzierkals) (PP) – 15:17	2–1
Tralmaks (Priede, Puide) – 19:58	3–1
Buncis (Dzierkals, Čukste) – 26:15	4–1
Zīle (Dzierkals, Čukste) – 47:43	5–1
	5–2	56:06 – Mayenschein (Halbauer, Korner)
	5–3	58:16 – Kalble (Drews, Halbauer) (PP)

16 min
Penalties
16 min
25
Shots
36

24 April 2015; 18:00	Germany	3–5 (1–0, 1–2, 1–3)	Latvia	Ice Center Lucerne, Lucerne; Attendance: 387

Game reference

Patrick Berger
Goalies
Mareks Mitens
Referees:
(France) Jimmy Bergamelli
(Finland) Petri Lindqvist
Linesmen:
(United States) Brian Oliver
(Switzerland) Michael Tscherrig

Korner (Schutz) – 00:16	1–0
Eder (Bernhardt, Schutz) (PP) – 24:46	2–0
	2–1	26:58 – Dzierkals (Balcers)
	2–2	34:05 – Buncis (Rubīns, Balcers)
	2–3	42:31 – Bernhards (Čukste)
	2–4	43:23 – Zohovs (Rubins) (SH)
Napravnik (Kalble, Spitzner) – 51:43	3–4
	3–5	57:05 – Zohovs (E. Jansons) (SH)

18 min
Penalties
12 min
40
Shots
27

- Germany is relegated to next year's Division I A; the third game was not played because the result of the relegation series had been decided.

=== Knockout stage ===
Quarterfinals
A1	Russia	0
B4	Switzerland	5
B2	Finland	3
A3	Slovakia	0
A2	United States	7
B3	Czech Republic	2
B1	Canada	5
A4	Sweden	3

Semifinals
B4	Switzerland	4
B2	Finland	5
A2	United States	7
B1	Canada	2

Gold medal game
A2	United States	2
B2	Finland	1
Bronze medal game
B1	Canada	5
B4	Switzerland	2

==== Quarterfinals ====
23 April 2015; 14:45	United States	7–2 (4–0, 0–1, 3–1)	Czech Republic	Ice Center Lucerne, Lucerne; Attendance: 542

Game reference

Evan Sarthou
Goalies
Aleš Stezka
Daniel Vladař
Referees:
(Switzerland) Andreas Koch
(Norway) Per Gustav Solem
Linesmen:
(Finland) Markku Buese
(Switzerland) Michael Tscherrig

Matthews (Fischer, Tkachuk) (PP) – 11:02	1–0
Keller (Bracco) – 11:09	2–0
Floodstrand (Warren, Terry) – 13:00	3–0
Kunin (Fischer, Greenway) – 15:07	4–0
	4–1	27:38 – Svoboda (Furch, Kalina)
Matthews (Tkachuk, Roslovic) – 40:39	5–1
Bracco (Fitzgerald, White) – 42:39	6–1
	6–2	52:39 – Zacha (Kaše, Hronek)
Kunin (Jones, Greenway) – 53:44	7–2

6 min
Penalties
12 min
43
Shots
14

23 April 2015; 16:00	Canada	5–3 (3–1, 1–1, 1–1)	Sweden	Bossard Arena, Zug; Attendance: 1,248

Game reference

Zach Sawchenko
Goalies
Felix Sandström
Referees:
(Czech Republic) Vladimír Pešina
(Germany) Marian Rohatsch
Linesmen:
(United States) Brian Oliver
(Russia) Alexander Otmakhov

Harkins (Bear) – 05:11	1–0
Stephens (Knott, Barzal) – 06:07	2–0
	2–1	07:11 – Carlsson (Ölund, Ohlsson) (PP)
Sideroff (Harkins, N. Roy) – 19:26	3–1
	3–2	22:51 – Eriksson Ek (Grundström) (SH)
Stephens (Knott, Barzal) – 37:23	4–2
	4–3	55:34 – Grundström (ENG)
Knott (Stephens, J. Roy) (PP) – 55:56	5–3

Grundström was credited for the goal at 55:34, being the last Swede to touch the puck, when Canada scored in their own net on a delayed penalty. The penalty was in fact a roughing minor to Grundström himself.
8 min
Penalties
13 min
34
Shots
38

23 April 2015; 18:45	Finland	3–0 (1–0, 0–0, 2–0)	Slovakia	Ice Center Lucerne, Lucerne; Attendance: 469

Game reference

Veini Vehvilainen
Goalies
Adam Húska
Referees:
(Sweden) Andreas Harnebring
(Russia) Yuriy Oskirko
Linesmen:
(Switzerland) Franco Espinoza
(Canada) Nicolas Piche

Laine – 06:39	1–0
Tavernier (Ruotsalainen) – 45:27	2–0
Tavernier (Ruotsalainen) – 48:01	3–0

8 min
Penalties
6 min
23
Shots
21

23 April 2015; 20:00	Russia	0–5 (0–1, 0–2, 0–2)	Switzerland	Bossard Arena, Zug; Attendance: 2,381

Game reference

Ilya Samsonov
Goalies
Joren van Pottleberghe
Referees:
(Finland) Petri Lindqvist
(Slovakia) Robert Mullner
Linesmen:
(Czech Republic) Jiří Gebauer
(Slovakia) Martin Korba

0–1	07:51 – Forrer
0–2	32:26 – Impose (Riat) (PP)
0–3	39:40 – Impose (Malgin)
0–4	43:21 – Malgin
0–5	51:22 – Volejnicek

18 min
Penalties
10 min
29
Shots
35

==== Semifinals ====
25 April 2015; 15:00	Canada	2–7 (0–0, 1–2, 1–5)	United States	Bossard Arena, Zug; Attendance: 4,170

Game reference

Zach Sawchenko
Evan Cormier
Goalies
Evan Sarthou
Referees:
(Sweden) Andreas Harnebring
(Finland) Petri Lindqvist
Linesmen:
(Finland) Markku Buese
(Finland) Hannu Sormunen

	0–1	22:25 – Keller (Bracco, Krys)
Sideroff (Wotherspoon, N. Roy) (PP) – 31:49	1–1
	1–2	37:58 – Matthews (Floodstrand)
	1–3	42:23 – Matthews (Tkachuk, Roslovic)
	1–4	42:55 – White (Jones)
Stephens (Howden, Bear) – 44:18	2–4
	2–5	44:39 – Greenway (Fischer)
	2–6	47:09 – White (Keller, Bracco)
	2–7	49:45 – White (Keller, Bracco)

12 min
Penalties
10 min
18
Shots
38

25 April 2015; 19:00	Finland	5–4 OT (2–2 0–0, 2–2) (OT 1–0)	Switzerland	Bossard Arena, Zug; Attendance: 7,015

Game reference

Veini Vehvilainen
Goalies
Joren van Pottelberghe
Referees:
(Canada) Brett Iverson
(Germany) Marian Rohatsch
Linesmen:
(Slovakia) Martin Korba
(Canada) Nicolas Piche

Puljujärvi (Välimaki) – 01:15	1–0
	1–1	04:45 – Riat (Siegenthaler, Impose)
	1–2	16:59 – Suleski (Malgin)
Laine (Saarela) – 19:04	2–2
Saarela (Niemelä) (PP) – 42:54	3–2
Laine (Puljujärvi) – 48:17	4–2
	4–3	58:04 – Hischier (Siegenthaler, Thurkauf)
	4–4	59:19 – Riat (Impose, Malgin) (EA)
Saarela (J. Mattila) – 65:19	5–4

10 min
Penalties
10 min
28
Shots
33

==== Bronze medal game ====
26 April 2015; 15:00	Canada	5–2 (3–2, 2–0, 0–0)	Switzerland	Bossard Arena, Zug; Attendance: 4,718

Game reference

Zach Sawchenko
Goalies
Joren van Pottelberghe
Referees:
(Czech Republic) Vladimír Pešina
(United States) Christopher Pitoscia
Linesmen:
(United States) Brian Oliver
(Finland) Hannu Sormunen

Gawdin (Soy) – 07:09	1–0
Harkins (Benson) – 09:39	2–0
Siderhoff (Knott, Capobianco) – 11:54	3–0
	3–1	17:30 – Riat (Pinana, Marchon) (PP)
	3–2	18:55 – Fuchs (Pinana, Prassl)
Howden (N. Roy, Siderhoff) – 36:25	4–2
Gawdin (Spencer, Soy) – 38:43	5–2

10 min
Penalties
2 min
33
Shots
30

==== Gold medal game ====
26 April 2015; 19:00	United States	2–1 OT (0–1, 0–0, 1–0) (OT 1–0)	Finland	Bossard Arena, Zug; Attendance: 4,457

Game reference

Evan Sarthou
Goalies
Veini Vehvilainen
Referees:
(Canada) Brett Iverson
(Germany) Marian Rohatsch
Linesmen:
(Russia) Alexander Otmakhov
(Canada) Nicolas Piche

	0–1	00:17 – Nättinen (Aho)
Roslovic (Tkachuk, Matthews) – 40:41	1–1
White (Bracco, McAvoy Jr.) – 72:44	2–1

2 min
Penalties
4 min
62
Shots
20

=== Scoring leaders ===
List shows the top ten skaters sorted by points, then goals.

Player	GP	G	A	Pts	+/−	PIM
(United States) Auston Matthews	7	8	7	15	+11	0
(United States) Jeremy Bracco	7	3	10	13	+10	2
(Canada) Mathew Barzal	7	3	9	12	+2	0
(United States) Matthew Tkachuk	7	2	10	12	+10	2
(Finland) Patrik Laine	7	8	3	11	+6	0
(United States) Jack Roslovic	7	6	5	11	+11	4
(Canada) Mitchell Stephens	7	5	5	10	+1	10
(United States) Colin White	7	6	3	9	+8	0
(United States) Clayton Keller	7	4	5	9	+7	0
(Latvia) Mārtiņš Dzierkals	6	3	6	9	+2	10

GP = Games played; G = Goals; A = Assists; Pts = Points; +/− = Plus–minus; PIM = Penalties In Minutes
Source: IIHF.com

=== Leading goaltenders ===
Only the top five goaltenders, based on save percentage, who have played 40% of their team's minutes are included in this list.

Player	TOI	SA	GA	GAA	Sv%	SO
(Russia) Anton Krasotkin	120:00	85	4	2.00	95.29	1
(Finland) Veini Vehviläinen	437:12	233	12	1.65	94.85	1
(Russia) Ilya Samsonov	180:00	121	8	2.67	93.39	0
(United States) Evan Sarthou	312:44	82	6	1.15	92.68	1
(Slovakia) Adam Húska	278:39	160	14	3.01	91.25	0

TOI = Time on ice (minutes:seconds); SA = Shots against; GA = Goals against; GAA = Goals against average; Sv% = Save percentage; SO = Shutouts
Source: IIHF.com

=== Tournament awards ===
Most Valuable Player

- Forward: (United States) Auston Matthews

All-star team

- Goaltender: (Finland) Veini Vehviläinen
- Defencemen: (Finland) Vili Saarijärvi, (Switzerland) Jonas Siegenthaler
- Forwards: (Finland) Patrik Laine, (Switzerland) Denis Malgin, (United States) Auston Matthews

IIHF best player awards

- Goaltender: (Russia) Ilya Samsonov
- Defenceman: (Finland) Vili Saarijärvi
- Forward: (United States) Auston Matthews

References: ,

=== Final standings ===
	Team
1st place, gold medalist(s)	United States
2nd place, silver medalist(s)	Finland
3rd place, bronze medalist(s)	Canada
4th	Switzerland
5th	Russia
6th	Czech Republic
7th	Slovakia
8th	Sweden
9th	Latvia
10th	Germany

Relegated to the 2016 Division I A

2015 IIHF U18 World champions

United States
9th title

== Division I ==
=== Group A ===
The Division I A tournament was played in Debrecen, Hungary, from 12 to 18 April 2015.

Pos	Team	Pld	W	OTW	OTL	L	GF	GA	GD	Pts	Promotion or relegation
1	Denmark	5	4	1	0	0	28	8	+20	14	Promoted to the 2016 Top Division
2	Belarus	5	3	1	1	0	19	11	+8	12	
3	France	5	2	1	0	2	16	13	+3	8	
4	Norway	5	2	0	2	1	14	12	+2	8	
5	Kazakhstan	5	1	0	0	4	15	28	−13	3	
6	Hungary	5	0	0	0	5	11	31	−20	0	Relegated to the 2016 Division I B

Source: IIHF

=== Group B ===
The Division I B tournament was played in Maribor, Slovenia, from 12 to 18 April 2015.

Pos	Team	Pld	W	OTW	OTL	L	GF	GA	GD	Pts	Promotion or relegation
1	Austria	5	5	0	0	0	26	6	+20	15	Promoted to the 2016 Division I A
2	Slovenia	5	3	0	1	1	27	21	+6	10	
3	Japan	5	2	1	0	2	16	16	0	8	
4	Ukraine	5	2	0	0	3	13	14	−1	6	
5	Italy	5	1	0	0	4	16	24	−8	3	
6	Lithuania	5	1	0	0	4	8	25	−17	3	Relegated to the 2016 Division II A

Source: IIHF

== Division II ==
=== Group A ===
The Division II A tournament was played in Tallinn, Estonia, from 22 to 28 March 2015.

Pos	Team	Pld	W	OTW	OTL	L	GF	GA	GD	Pts	Promotion or relegation
1	South Korea	5	5	0	0	0	28	7	+21	15	Promoted to the 2016 Division I B
2	Poland	5	4	0	0	1	18	10	+8	12	
3	Great Britain	5	2	1	0	2	18	13	+5	8	
4	Netherlands	5	1	1	1	2	18	22	−4	6	
5	Croatia	5	1	0	0	4	9	24	−15	3	
6	Estonia	5	0	0	1	4	11	26	−15	1	Relegated to the 2016 Division II B

Source: IIHF

=== Group B ===
The Division II B tournament was played in Novi Sad, Serbia, from 16 to 22 March 2015.

Pos	Team	Pld	W	OTW	OTL	L	GF	GA	GD	Pts	Promotion or relegation
1	Romania	5	4	1	0	0	46	12	+34	14	Promoted to the 2016 Division II A
2	Spain	5	4	0	1	0	28	13	+15	13	
3	Serbia	5	3	0	0	2	21	13	+8	9	
4	Belgium	5	1	1	0	3	20	26	−6	5	
5	China	5	1	0	0	4	14	27	−13	3	
6	Australia	5	0	0	1	4	11	49	−38	1	Relegated to the 2016 Division III A

Source: IIHF

== Division III ==
=== Group A ===
The Division III A tournament was played in Taipei City, Taiwan, from 22 to 28 March 2015.

Pos	Team	Pld	W	OTW	OTL	L	GF	GA	GD	Pts	Promotion or relegation
1	Iceland	5	3	2	0	0	19	13	+6	13	Promoted to the 2016 Division II B
2	Mexico	5	1	2	2	0	17	10	+7	9	
3	Bulgaria	5	2	0	2	1	14	12	+2	8	
4	Chinese Taipei	5	2	1	0	2	28	16	+12	8	
5	Israel	5	2	0	1	2	16	15	+1	7	
6	South Africa	5	0	0	0	5	7	35	−28	0	Relegated to the 2016 Division III B

Source: IIHF

=== Group B ===
The Division III B tournament was played in Auckland, New Zealand, from 17 to 19 March 2015.

Pos	Team	Pld	W	OTW	OTL	L	GF	GA	GD	Pts	Promotion or relegation
1	Turkey	2	2	0	0	0	14	5	+9	6	Promoted to the 2016 Division III A
2	New Zealand	2	1	0	0	1	12	10	+2	3	
3	Hong Kong	2	0	0	0	2	6	17	−11	0	

Source: IIHF
