= Sebastian Ohlsson =

Sebastian Ohlsson may refer to:

- Sebastian Ohlsson (footballer, born 1992), Swedish footballer for Trelleborgs FF
- Sebastian Ohlsson (footballer, born 1993), Swedish footballer for IFK Göteborg
- Sebastian Ohlsson (ice hockey) (born 1997), Swedish ice hockey player
