= Gustav Olhaver =

Swedish ice hockey player (born 1997)

- Born: 3 July 1997 (age 29) Ängelholm, Sweden
- Height: 6 ft 6 in (198 cm)
- Weight: 225 lb (102 kg; 16 st 1 lb)
- Position: Forward
- Shoots: Left
- team Former teams: Free agent Rögle BK; SaiPa; HV71
- NHL draft: 191st overall, 2015; Colorado Avalanche
- Playing career: 2016–present

Gustav Olhaver (born 3 July 1997) is a Swedish professional ice hockey forward who is currently an unrestricted free agent. He most recently played for Mora IK of the HockeyAllsvenskan (Allsv). He was selected by the Colorado Avalanche, 191st overall, in the 2015 NHL entry draft.

== Playing career ==
Olhaver played as a youth in his native Sweden, within the Rögle BK junior program. Possessing a towering frame, Olhaver played parts of two seasons in the J20 SuperElit, producing 12 points in 41 games throughout the 2014–15 season. Showing glimpses of offensive touch, Olhaver was drafted in the seventh round, 191st overall, with the Colorado Avalanche's last selection in the 2015 NHL entry draft.

With intention's to pursue a major junior career in North America, Olhaver joined the Avalanche's rookie camp and was selected 44th overall in the 2015 CHL Import Draft by the Seattle Thunderbirds of the Western Hockey League. On July 1, 2015, Olhaver agreed to terms to join the Thunderbirds for the 2015–16 season. While aiming to develop his offensive game with his physical play, Olhaver struggled to make an impact and was placed on waivers by the Thunderbirds and later picked up by the Swift Current Broncos on December 28, 2015. Olhaver played out the season with the Broncos, finishing the season with a combined 8 points in 51 games.

On May 27, 2016, Olhaver opted to return to the junior ranks with Rögle BK. In the 2016–17 season, while enjoying a productive return to the J20, Olhaver made his professional debut in the Swedish Hockey League with Rögle BK. He featured in 10 games in recording 1 assist.

Having graduated from the under-20 level, and with a roster position limited with Rögle BK, Olhaver left the club to sign a one-year contract with second tier outfit, IK Oskarshamn of the HockeyAllsvenskan on April 24, 2017. In the off-season, he attended his third training camp with the Avalanche, before returning to begin the 2017–18 season with Oskarshamn. In his first full season in the Allsvenskan, Olhaver earned a regular role amongst the forwards, contributing with 6 goals and 13 points in 48 games.

After a post-season exit, Olhaver left Oskarshamn opting to continue in the Allsvenskan on a two-year contract with Tingsryds AIF on April 16, 2018. In his final season under contract, Olhaver established himself within Tingsryds, recording professional highs with 13 goals and 22 points in 47 games. He played a solitary game in a return to the SHL, with original club, Rögle BK.

On 27 March 2020, Olhaver signed a one-year contract with Modo Hockey to continue in the Allsvenskan. In his fourth season in the Allsvenskan in 2020–21, Olhaver struggled to find his role with Modo, adding just 1 assist through 11 games, before leaving the club to return to former team in Tingsryds AIF on 10 December 2020. In a checking line role, Olhaver contributed with 6 goals and 8 points through 32 regular season games.

As a free agent, Olhaver continued his career in the Swedish second tier, signing a one-year contract with Kristianstads IK on 30 July 2021. In the 2021–22 season Olhaver broke out offensively with Kristianstads, notching career high marks of 14 goals and 27 points in 52 regular season games.

Leaving Sweden in the off-season, Olhaver signed an optional two-year contract in the neighbouring Finnish Liiga, with SaiPa, on 28 April 2022. In the 2022–23 season, Olhaver was a staple to SaiPa's checking line, posting 3 goals and 10 points through 56 regular season games.

Opting to decline his second year option with SaiPa, Olhaver returned to Sweden and agreed to a one-year contract with former club, Tingryds AIF of the Allsvenskan, on 25 July 2023. Olhaver enjoyed his most productive professional season in 2023–24, contributing with 13 goals and 16 assists for 29 points through 52 regular season games. He briefly made a return to the SHL, in a loan appearance with HV71 on 20 December 2023.

As a free agent, Olhaver continued his career in the Allsvenskan, moving to Mora IK on a one-year deal on 30 April 2024.

== Career statistics ==
=== Regular season and playoffs ===
			Regular season					Playoffs
Season	Team	League	GP	G	A	Pts	PIM	GP	G	A	Pts	PIM
2013–14	Rögle BK	J20	5	1	0	1	2	—	—	—	—	—
2014–15	Rögle BK	J20	41	6	6	12	10	6	0	0	0	2
2015–16	Seattle Thunderbirds	WHL	31	2	3	5	17	—	—	—	—	—
2015–16	Swift Current Broncos	WHL	20	1	2	3	2	—	—	—	—	—
2016–17	Rögle BK	J20	36	15	23	38	41	3	1	0	1	0
2016–17	Rögle BK	SHL	10	0	1	1	0	—	—	—	—	—
2016–17	Helsingborgs HC	Div.1	1	0	0	0	0	—	—	—	—	—
2017–18	IK Oskarshamn	Allsv	48	6	7	13	20	8	0	0	0	2
2018–19	Tingsryds AIF	Allsv	51	4	4	8	10	—	—	—	—	—
2019–20	Tingsryds AIF	Allsv	47	13	9	22	31	—	—	—	—	—
2019–20	Rögle BK	SHL	1	0	0	0	0	—	—	—	—	—
2020–21	Modo Hockey	Allsv	11	0	1	1	0	—	—	—	—	—
2020–21	Tingsryds AIF	Allsv	32	6	2	8	10	2	0	0	0	0
2021–22	Kristianstads IK	Allsv	52	14	13	27	10	6	0	0	0	2
2022–23	SaiPa	Liiga	56	3	7	10	20	—	—	—	—	—
2023–24	Tingsryds AIF	Allsv	52	13	16	29	16	—	—	—	—	—
2023–24	HV71	SHL	1	0	0	0	0	—	—	—	—	—
2024–25	Mora IK	Allsv	50	8	3	11	23	6	0	0	0	9
2025–26	Mora IK	Allsv	45	5	6	11	8	2	0	0	0	4
2025–26	HV71	SHL	1	0	0	0	0	—	—	—	—	—
SHL totals			13	0	1	1	0	—	—	—	—	—
Liiga totals			56	3	7	10	20	—	—	—	—	—

=== International ===
Year	Team	Event	Result	GP	G	A	Pts	PIM
2015	Sweden	U18	8th	5	1	0	1	0
Junior totals				5	1	0	1	0
