= Christian Fischer =

American ice hockey player (born 1997)

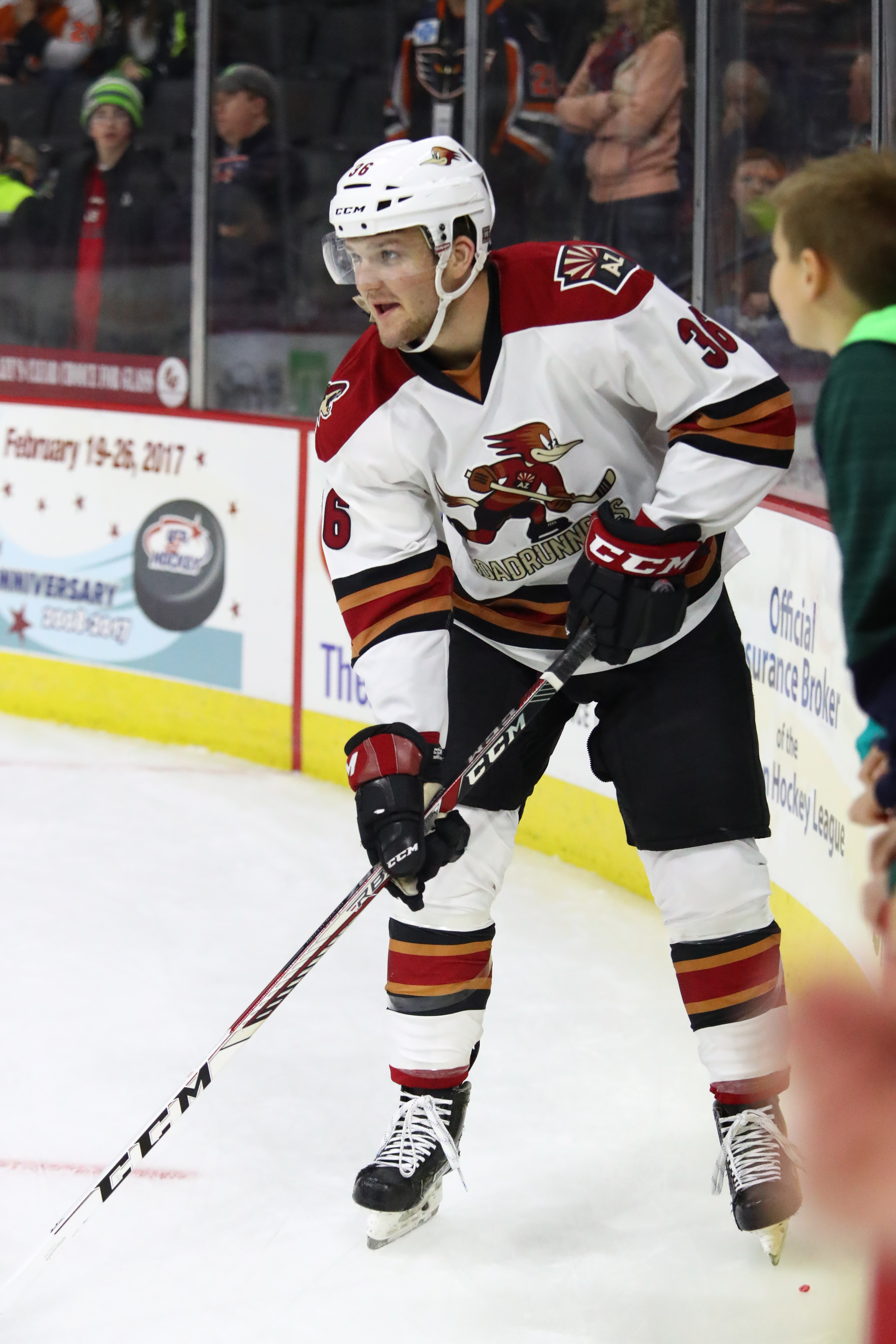
- Fischer with the Tucson Roadrunners in 2017
- Born: April 15, 1997 (age 29) Chicago, Illinois, U.S.
- Height: 6 ft 2 in (188 cm)
- Weight: 212 lb (96 kg; 15 st 2 lb)
- Position: Center / Right wing
- Shot: Right
- Played for: Arizona Coyotes; Detroit Red Wings; Columbus Blue Jackets
- NHL draft: 32nd overall, 2015; Arizona Coyotes
- Playing career: 2016–2025

Christian Fischer (born April 15, 1997) is an American former professional ice hockey forward. He was drafted by the Arizona Coyotes, 32nd overall, in the 2015 NHL entry draft, and also played in the NHL for the Detroit Red Wings and Columbus Blue Jackets

== Playing career ==
Fischer played his juniors hockey with Chicago Mission Bantam AAA, Chicago Mission Midget AAA, and Chicago Mission U16, registering 44 goals and 95 points in a total of 77 games in the 3 seasons. He was selected in the 11th round of the 2013 OHL Priority Selection, however, he was not signed.

After that, he played in the USA Hockey National Team Development Program, and played with the USA U17 hockey team. The following season he competed with the U18 and the junior team again and was selected 32nd overall by Arizona in the 2015 NHL Entry Draft. On March 5, 2015, Fischer scored the fastest goal in USHL history, scoring six seconds into a game against the Omaha Lancers.

On August 20, 2015, Fischer signed a three-year entry-level contract with the Arizona Coyotes. On August 24 Fischer came to terms with the Windsor Spitfires of the OHL, who previously drafted him in 2013, continuing his junior career.

After completing his rookie campaign with the Spitfires in 2015–16, Fischer continued his year by signing an amateur try-out contract with the Coyotes' AHL affiliate, the Springfield Falcons, on April 7, 2016. He made his professional debut with the Falcons, finishing with 3 points in 6 games. On January 21, 2017, he was called up to the Arizona Coyotes and played in his NHL debut against the Tampa Bay Lightning. With just over two minutes left in the second period, Fischer scored his first NHL goal from a feed from teammates Jamie McGinn and Alexander Burmistrov in a 5–3 victory.

Fischer then spent the entirety of the 2017–18 season with the Coyotes in the NHL, finishing his rookie campaign with 33 points in 79 games. Following his rookie season, Fischer was named to the Coyotes opening night roster for the 2018–19 season. Fischer recorded his first career NHL hat trick on October 23, in a 4–1 win over the Columbus Blue Jackets.

On October 28, 2022, in the 1st period, Fischer scored the first NHL goal in the Mullett Arena, the temporary home of the Arizona Coyotes which is shared by the ASU Sun Devils. Later in the period, he scored the second goal in Mullett Arena.

On July 2, 2023, Fischer signed a one-year, $1.125 million contract with the Detroit Red Wings.

On March 5, 2025, Fischer was waived by the Red Wings; he was subsequently claimed by the Columbus Blue Jackets the following day. He played only one game with the Blue Jackets.

On July 4th, 2025, Fischer announced his retirement from professional hockey, to pursue a business opportunity in golf.

== International play ==
Fischer represented the United States by playing on the National U17 Team in January 2014, and the National U18 Team in 2015, winning 2 gold medals and adding 3 goals and 11 assists in the 2 tournaments.

== Personal life ==
Fischer resides in Scottsdale, Arizona year-round. His favorite hobbies include golf, listening to the musical artist Drake and going to the movies. In the summer of 2022, Fischer officiated his sister's wedding in Wisconsin.

== Career statistics ==
=== Regular season and playoffs ===
			Regular season					Playoffs
Season	Team	League	GP	G	A	Pts	PIM	GP	G	A	Pts	PIM
2012–13	Chicago Mission 16U AAA	HPHL	25	12	14	26	10	—	—	—	—	—
2013–14	U.S. NTDP Juniors	USHL	34	11	12	23	6	—	—	—	—	—
2013–14	U.S. NTDP U17	USDP	54	19	23	42	23	—	—	—	—	—
2014–15	U.S. NTDP Juniors	USHL	25	15	15	30	10	—	—	—	—	—
2014–15	U.S. NTDP U18	USDP	66	31	33	64	22	—	—	—	—	—
2015–16	Windsor Spitfires	OHL	66	40	50	90	34	5	1	2	3	0
2015–16	Springfield Falcons	AHL	6	2	1	3	0	—	—	—	—	—
2016–17	Tucson Roadrunners	AHL	57	20	27	47	28	—	—	—	—	—
2016–17	Arizona Coyotes	NHL	7	3	0	3	0	—	—	—	—	—
2017–18	Arizona Coyotes	NHL	79	15	18	33	14	—	—	—	—	—
2018–19	Arizona Coyotes	NHL	71	11	7	18	27	—	—	—	—	—
2019–20	Arizona Coyotes	NHL	56	6	3	9	16	9	0	1	1	6
2020–21	Arizona Coyotes	NHL	52	3	8	11	6	—	—	—	—	—
2021–22	Arizona Coyotes	NHL	53	5	5	10	14	—	—	—	—	—
2022–23	Arizona Coyotes	NHL	80	13	14	27	20	—	—	—	—	—
2023–24	Detroit Red Wings	NHL	79	5	14	19	36	—	—	—	—	—
2024–25	Detroit Red Wings	NHL	45	1	6	7	11	—	—	—	—	—
2024–25	Columbus Blue Jackets	NHL	1	0	0	0	0	—	—	—	—	—
NHL totals			523	62	75	137	144	9	0	1	1	6

=== International ===
Year	Team	Event	Result	GP	G	A	Pts	PIM
2014	United States	U17	1st place, gold medalist(s)	6	2	4	6	2
2015	United States	U18	1st place, gold medalist(s)	7	1	7	8	0
Junior totals				13	3	11	14	2

== Records ==
- Fastest USHL goal in history (6 seconds in game)
