= Joonas Niemelä =

Finnish ice hockey player

- Born: 14 January 1997 (age 29) Espoo, Finland
- Height: 180 cm (5 ft 11 in)
- Weight: 82 kg (181 lb; 12 st 13 lb)
- Position: Forward
- Shoots: Left
- ML team Former teams: Rødovre Mighty Bulls; Espoo Blues; Lukko; HC Gherdëina; Saale Bulls Halle; EC Kitzbühel; Aalborg Pirates
- Playing career: 2015–present

Joonas Niemelä (born 14 January 1997) is a Finnish ice hockey forward currently playing for Rødovre Mighty Bulls of the Danish Metal Ligaen.

== Career statistics ==
=== Regular season and playoffs ===
			Regular season					Playoffs
Season	Team	League	GP	G	A	Pts	PIM	GP	G	A	Pts	PIM
2015–16	Espoo Blues	Liiga	28	0	1	1	12	—	—	—	—	—
2016–17	Lukko	Liiga	38	5	0	5	2	—	—	—	—	—
2016–17	KeuPa HT	Mestis	21	6	6	12	51	4	0	0	0	27
2017–18	Lukko	Liiga	1	0	0	0	0	—	—	—	—	—
2017–18	KeuPa HT	Mestis	36	6	7	13	30	14	2	5	7	4
2018–19	Hermes	Mestis	45	16	32	48	60	6	2	3	5	16
2019–20	Kiekko-Vantaa	Mestis	48	19	22	41	52	—	—	—	—	—
2020–21	Kiekko-Espoo	Mestis	10	1	9	10	33	—	—	—	—	—
2020–21	HC Gherdëina	AlpsHL	12	10	7	17	8	5	3	3	6	2
2021–22	Saale Bulls Halle	Oberliga	37	35	38	73	14	7	8	3	11	6
2022–23	EC Kitzbühel	AlpsHL	32	21	29	50	22	—	—	—	—	—
2023–24	EC Kitzbühel	AlpsHL	36	22	29	51	26	3	1	1	2	0
2024–25	Aalborg Pirates	Metal Ligaen	35	17	13	30	24	12	1	5	6	4
2025–26	Rødovre Mighty Bulls	Metal Ligaen	41	19	21	40	24	5	1	2	3	2
Liiga totals			67	5	1	6	14	—	—	—	—	—
AlpsHL totals			80	53	65	118	56	8	4	4	8	2
Metal Ligaen totals			76	36	34	70	48	17	2	7	9	6

=== International ===
Year	Team	Event	GP	G	A	Pts	PIM
2014	Finland U18	IH18	4	0	0	0	2
2015	Finland U18	WJC-18	7	1	0	1	6
Junior totals			11	1	0	1	8
