= Mitchell Stephens (ice hockey) =

Canadian ice hockey player (born 1997)

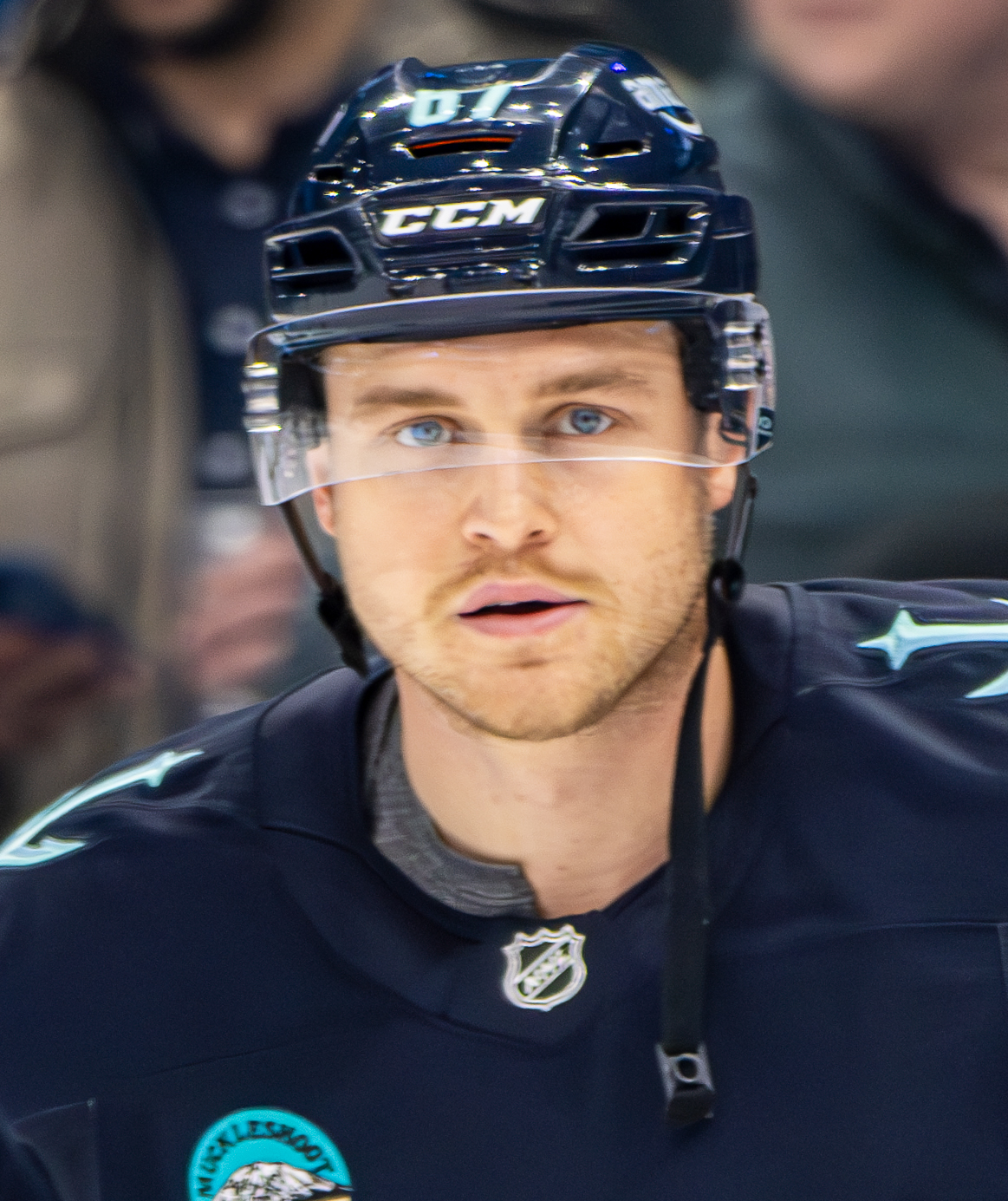
- Stephens in 2024
- Born: February 5, 1997 (age 29) Peterborough, Ontario, Canada
- Height: 6 ft 0 in (183 cm)
- Weight: 203 lb (92 kg; 14 st 7 lb)
- Position: Centre
- Shoots: Right
- AHL team Former teams: Coachella Valley Firebirds; Tampa Bay Lightning; Detroit Red Wings; Montreal Canadiens; Seattle Kraken
- NHL draft: 33rd overall, 2015; Tampa Bay Lightning
- Playing career: 2016–present

Mitchell Stephens (born February 5, 1997) is a Canadian professional ice hockey centre for the Coachella Valley Firebirds of the American Hockey League (AHL). He was selected in the second round, 33rd overall, by the Tampa Bay Lightning in the 2015 NHL entry draft and won back-to-back Stanley Cups with the Lightning in 2020 and 2021. Stephens has also previously played for the Detroit Red Wings, Montreal Canadiens and Seattle Kraken.

== Junior career ==
=== Amateur ===
Stephens was born on February 5, 1997, in Peterborough, Ontario to parents Lee and Heather. Growing up in Peterborough, Stephens played in the Peterborough Minor Hockey Council's AAA Petes program before joining the Toronto Marlboros of the Greater Toronto Hockey League (GTHL). While playing with the Minor Midget AAA Toronto Marlboros, Stephens helped lead the team to a Kraft Cup title and Scotiabank GTHL Playoffs championship during the 2012–13 season. He reached this achievement by recording 44 goals and 84 points in 58 regular-season games. As a result of his play, Stephens was drafted eighth overall by the Saginaw Spirit in the 2013 Ontario Hockey League (OHL) Priority Selection draft.

=== Major junior ===
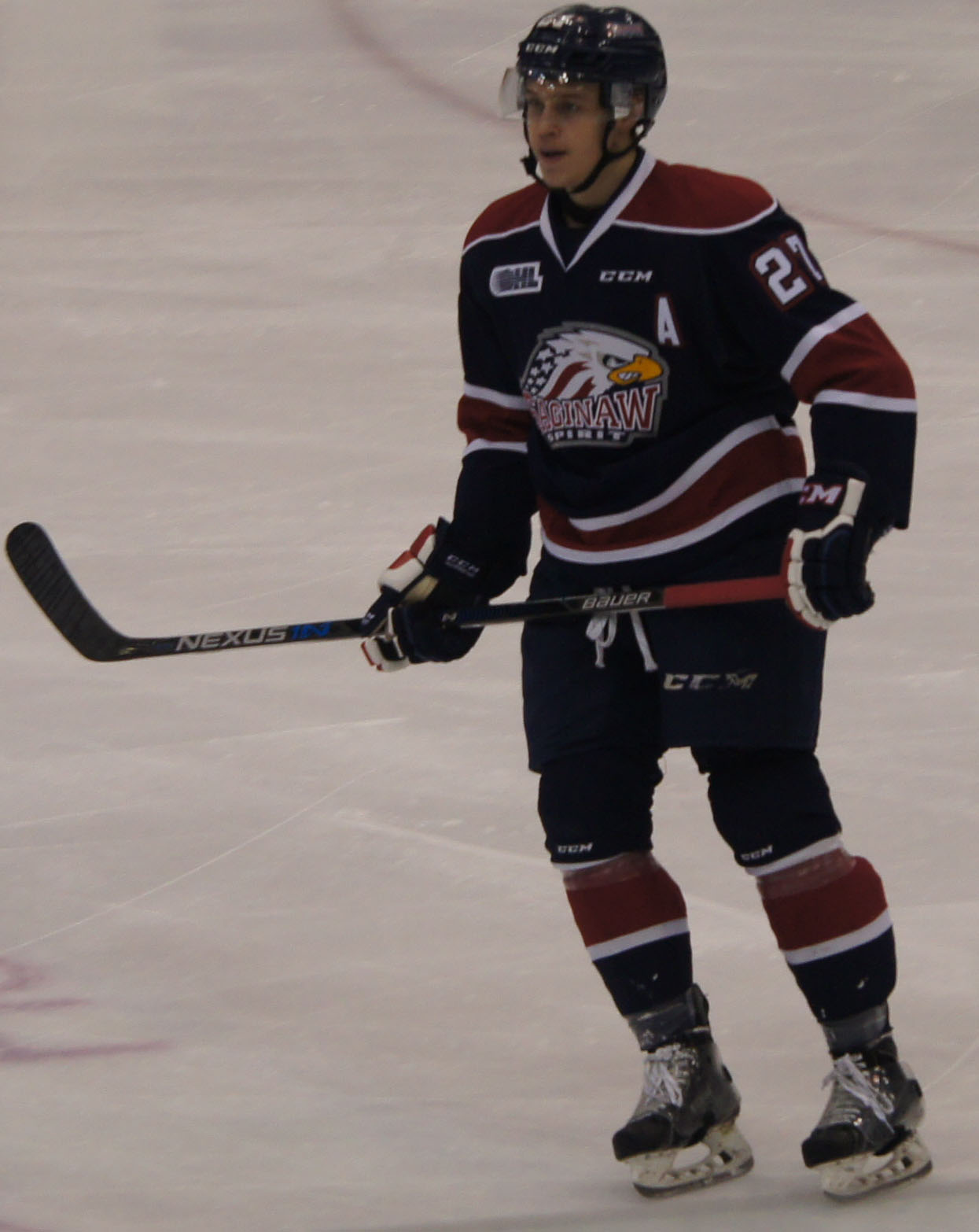
Stephens with the Saginaw Spirit in 2016.

His outstanding play with Saginaw was recognized when he was chosen to skate as a member of Canada Ontario at the 2014 World U-17 Hockey Challenge. During the 2014–15 season, Stephens was chosen to skate at the 2015 CHL/NHL Top Prospects Game.

In his final season with Saginaw in 2015–16, Stephens made 43 appearances, tallying 22 goals and 19 assists, while being named team MVP. He missed a significant number of games due to a broken foot that season. Stephens returned to the OHL for the 2016–17 season. Stephens was named captain of the Spirit with alternates Kris Bennett, C.J. Garcia, and Keaton Middleton. He remained captain of the team until January 2017 when he was traded to the London Knights in exchange for various draft picks. At the time of the trade, Stephens scored 62 goals to rank 14th all-time in franchise history. However, Stephens played only 29 regular season games with the Knights and 14 playoff games before returning to the Crunch.

== Professional career ==
=== Tampa Bay Lightning ===
Stephens was selected by the Tampa Bay Lightning of the National Hockey League (NHL) in the second round (33rd overall) of the 2015 NHL entry draft. On April 4, 2016, Stephens penned a three-year entry-level contract with the Lightning and was sent to their American Hockey League (AHL) team, the Syracuse Crunch, on an amateur try-out contract. He subsequently made his professional debut with the Crunch on April 8, 2016. He finished the season with the Crunch, recording one goal in five games. In his first full season in the AHL with the Crunch, Stephens was selected to appear in the 2018 AHL All-Star Classic.

On December 9, 2019, Stephens made his NHL debut in a 5–1 Lightning loss to the visiting New York Islanders at Amalie Arena. On December 28, 2019, Stephens recorded his first career NHL goal in 5–4 Lightning win over the Montreal Canadiens. On August 3, 2020, Stephens skated in his first career NHL playoff game, recording his first career NHL playoff goal and point. As a result, he signed a two-year contract extension to remain with the Lightning on October 7, 2020. Stephens saw limited playing time during the 2020–21 season due to injury, appearing in just seven games with the Lightning and four additional games with the Crunch. He won his second Stanley Cup with the Lightning at the end of the 2021 Stanley Cup playoffs.

=== Detroit Red Wings ===
On July 30, 2021, Stephens was traded to the Detroit Red Wings in exchange for a sixth-round pick in the 2022 NHL entry draft. While attending the Red Wings training camp, Stephens earned praise from coach Jeff Blashill for his skating ability and energy while projecting he would play on their fourth line. During the 2021–22 season, he skated in 27 games with the Red Wings, scoring six points. His season was interrupted by a lower-body injury that kept him out from November 13, 2021 to April 8, 2022.

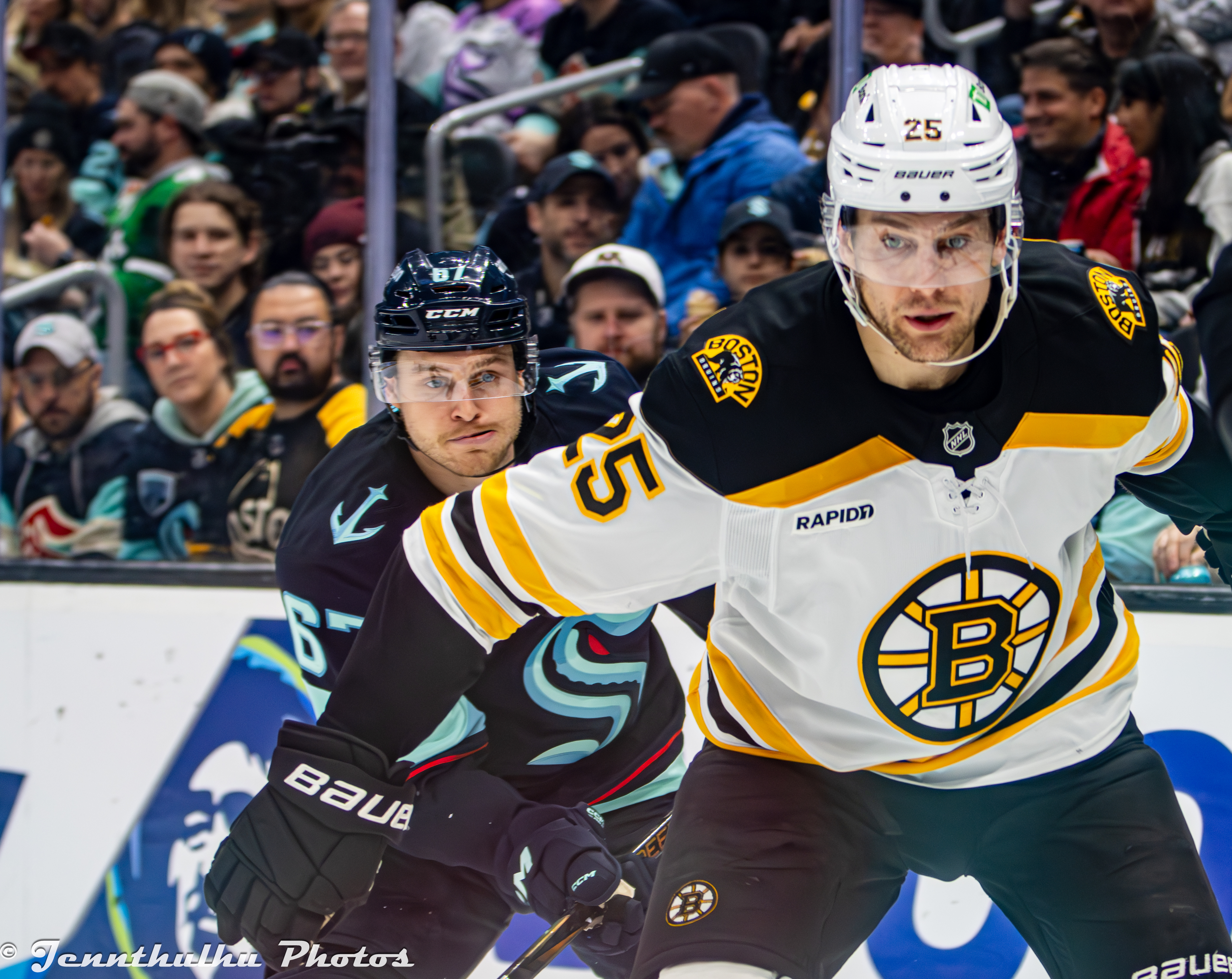
Stephens (left) during a game against the Boston Bruins in December 2024.

=== Montreal Canadiens ===
On July 13, 2022, Stephens signed a one-year, two-way contract with the Montreal Canadiens. He spent the entire 2022–23 season with Montreal's AHL affiliate, the Laval Rocket, scoring 20 goals and 41 points in 68 games. He re-signed with Montreal on July 10, 2023 to a one-year, two-way contract. Stephens participated in the Canadiens' 2023 training camp, but was placed on waivers and after going unclaimed, was assigned to Laval to start the 2023–24 season. He was recalled by Montreal on December 1, 2023. He made his Canadiens debut in a 5–4 overtime loss to the Detroit Red Wings on December 2 playing on the fourth line with Jesse Ylönen and Joel Armia. He scored his first goal for the Canadiens in a 5–2 win over the Chicago Blackhawks on December 23.

=== Seattle Kraken ===
As an unrestricted free agent entering the NHL free agency period, Stephens signed a two-year, two-way contract with the Seattle Kraken on July 1, 2024.

Having completed his two year tenure with the Kraken, Stephens opted to remain within the organization, signing a two-year AHL contract with the Coachella Valley Firebirds on 8 July 2026.

== International play ==
Stephens competed as a member of Canada Ontario at the 2014 World U-17 Hockey Challenge. He was also invited to compete with the Canada men's national under-18 ice hockey team at the 2014 Ivan Hlinka Memorial Tournament where he helped Team Canada win gold. In April 2015, he captained the Canada men's national under-18 ice hockey team to a bronze medal as the 2015 IIHF World U18 Championships.

== Personal life ==
Stephens is the cousin to Owen Tippett of the Philadelphia Flyers.

== Career statistics ==
=== Regular season and playoffs ===
			Regular season					Playoffs
Season	Team	League	GP	G	A	Pts	PIM	GP	G	A	Pts	PIM
2012–13	Toronto Marlboros	GTMMHL	58	44	40	84	12	—	—	—	—	—
2013–14	Saginaw Spirit	OHL	57	9	12	21	8	5	0	2	2	2
2014–15	Saginaw Spirit	OHL	62	22	26	48	44	4	0	0	0	0
2015–16	Saginaw Spirit	OHL	39	20	18	38	14	4	2	1	3	0
2015–16	Syracuse Crunch	AHL	5	1	0	1	0	—	—	—	—	—
2016–17	Saginaw Spirit	OHL	22	11	17	28	14	—	—	—	—	—
2016–17	London Knights	OHL	29	11	14	25	12	14	7	3	10	2
2016–17	Syracuse Crunch	AHL	—	—	—	—	—	3	0	0	0	0
2017–18	Syracuse Crunch	AHL	70	19	22	41	24	7	1	5	6	4
2018–19	Syracuse Crunch	AHL	32	11	13	24	6	4	0	1	1	2
2019–20	Syracuse Crunch	AHL	24	5	5	10	15	—	—	—	—	—
2019–20	Tampa Bay Lightning	NHL	38	3	3	6	10	7	1	0	1	2
2020–21	Syracuse Crunch	AHL	4	1	7	8	0	—	—	—	—	—
2020–21	Tampa Bay Lightning	NHL	7	0	1	1	0	—	—	—	—	—
2021–22	Detroit Red Wings	NHL	27	0	6	6	8	—	—	—	—	—
2022–23	Laval Rocket	AHL	68	20	21	41	49	—	—	—	—	—
2023–24	Laval Rocket	AHL	49	13	22	35	16	—	—	—	—	—
2023–24	Montreal Canadiens	NHL	23	2	1	3	4	—	—	—	—	—
2024–25	Coachella Valley Firebirds	AHL	35	6	7	13	23	2	3	0	3	0
2024–25	Seattle Kraken	NHL	28	1	2	3	6	—	—	—	—	—
2025–26	Coachella Valley Firebirds	AHL	69	12	15	27	22	12	2	2	4	6
NHL totals			123	6	13	19	28	7	1	0	1	2

=== International ===
Year	Team	Event	Result	GP	G	A	Pts	PIM
2014	Canada Ontario	U17	5th	5	0	2	2	6
2014	Canada	IH18	1st place, gold medalist(s)	5	4	2	6	2
2015	Canada	WJC18	3rd place, bronze medalist(s)	7	5	5	10	10
2016	Canada	WJC	6th	5	1	1	2	2
2017	Canada	WJC	2nd place, silver medalist(s)	5	2	3	5	0
Junior totals				27	12	13	25	20

== Awards and honours ==
Award	Year
CHL
CHL/NHL Top Prospects Game	2015
AHL
All-Star Game	2018
NHL
Stanley Cup champion	2020, 2021
International
World U-17 Hockey Challenge Canada Ontario	2014
Ivan Hlinka Memorial Tournament Gold Medal	2014
IIHF World U18 Championship Bronze Medal	2015
IIHF World U18 Championship Top 3 Player on Team	2015

Awards and achievements
Preceded by Daniel Sprong	AHL Rookie of the Month; January 2018	Succeeded by Janne Kuokkanen
