= Danil Yurtaikin =

Russian ice hockey player (born 1997)

- Born: 1 July 1997 (age 29) Belovo, Russia
- Height: 5 ft 11 in (180 cm)
- Weight: 165 lb (75 kg; 11 st 11 lb)
- Position: Left wing
- Shoots: Right
- KHL team Former teams: Amur Khabarovsk; Lokomotiv Yaroslavl; San Jose Sharks; CSKA Moscow; Traktor Chelyabinsk; Lada Togliatti; Neftekhimik Nizhnekamsk
- NHL draft: Undrafted
- Playing career: 2016–present

Danil Vitalevich Yurtaikin (Russian: Данил Витальевич Юртайкин; born 1 July 1997) is a Russian professional ice hockey forward, for Amur Khabarovsk of the Kontinental Hockey League (KHL). He formerly played with the San Jose Sharks of the National Hockey League (NHL), as well as Lokomotiv Yaroslavl, CSKA Moscow, Lada Togliatti and Neftekhimik Nizhnekamsk in the KHL. Internationally Yurtaikin has played for the Russian national junior team, and won a bronze medal at the 2017 World Junior Championships.

== Playing career ==
Yurtaikin played as a youth within the Lokomotiv Yaroslavl program, joining the club to play at the under-16 level. He was later selected by Yaroslavl 108th overall in the 2014 KHL Junior Draft. He progressed his development, playing with junior affiliate, Loko Yaroslavl in the MHL. He scored 73 points in 99 games over three seasons with Loko, culminating in two championship titles in 2015–16 and 2017–18.

He made his professional debut during the 2016–17 season, playing with second-tier club, HC Ryazan of the Supreme Hockey League (VHL). Showing offensive ability he notched 21 points in 26 games in the VHL and signed a two-year contract extension to remain with Lokomotiv Yaroslavl through 2019.

Before beginning the 2017–18 season, Yurtaikin was traded in exchange for financial compensation to Amur Khabarovsk on 9 October 2017. He made his debut in the Kontinental Hockey League, earning just 1:35 time on ice for Amur in a 1–0 victory over Avangard Omsk on 14 October 2017. He made just 5 appearances with Amur before he was assigned to their junior MHL affiliate. On 24 November 2017, Yurtaikin was promptly returned to Lokomotiv in a trade, and made his Lokomotiv debut on 29 November 2017. He completed the season going scoreless in 18 regular season contests and 2 playoff games.

On the back of his second MHL title with Loko to end the 2017–18 season, Yurtaikin broke out offensively in the following 2018–19 season. He recorded 10 goals and 19 points in 40 games with Lokomotiv Yaroslavl, finishing tied for third among under-22 skaters in goals and fifth in points. As Lokomotiv's fourth highest regular season goalscorer, he appeared in 8 playoff games and collected one assist.

Undrafted and with his contract concluded with Lokomotiv, Yurtaikin was signed as a free agent to a two-year, entry-level contract with the San Jose Sharks of the National Hockey League (NHL) on 26 April 2019. In his debut season in North America, Yurtaikin opened the 2019–20 season on the Sharks roster, appearing in 4 regular season games while going scoreless. He was later assigned to AHL affiliate, the San Jose Barracuda, contributing with 2 goals and 17 points through 37 games.

With the following 2020–21 North American season delayed due to the ongoing COVID-19 pandemic, Yurtaikin remained in his native Russia. On 22 December 2020, Yurtaikin's KHL rights were traded from Lokomotiv Yaroslavl in exchange for financial compensation. With the intent to remain in Russia, Yurtaikin was placed on unconditional waivers by the San Jose Sharks, mutually terminating the remaining year of his contract on 25 December 2020. He was signed the following day returning to the KHL with CSKA Moscow on a three-year contract.

After playing out the end of the 2024–25 season, with HC Lada Togliatti, Yurtaikin agreed to mutually terminate the remaining season of his contract and leave Lada as a free agent on 18 August 2025. As a free agent, Yurtaikin was signed to a one-year contract with Neftekhimik Nizhnekamsk on 20 August 2025.

== Career statistics ==
=== Regular season and playoffs ===
| | | | Regular season | | | | | Playoffs |
| Season | Team | League | GP | G | A | Pts | PIM | GP | G | A | Pts | PIM |
|---|---|---|---|---|---|---|---|---|---|---|---|---|
| 2013–14 | Loko-Junior Yaroslavl | MHL B | 22 | 14 | 19 | 33 | 4 | 10 | 1 | 4 | 5 | 4 |
| 2014–15 | Loko-Junior Yaroslavl | MHL B | 3 | 0 | 1 | 1 | 0 | — | — | — | — | — |
| 2014–15 | Loko Yaroslavl | MHL | 50 | 16 | 16 | 32 | 8 | 7 | 1 | 2 | 3 | 6 |
| 2015–16 | Loko Yaroslavl | MHL | 33 | 11 | 21 | 32 | 4 | 15 | 3 | 9 | 12 | 2 |
| 2016–17 | HC Ryazan | VHL | 26 | 9 | 12 | 21 | 10 | 4 | 0 | 1 | 1 | 0 |
| 2016–17 | Loko Yaroslavl | MHL | 6 | 0 | 4 | 4 | 2 | 3 | 0 | 2 | 2 | 2 |
| 2016–17 | Loko-Junior Yaroslavl | NMHL | 2 | 3 | 4 | 7 | 2 | 1 | 0 | 0 | 0 | 0 |
| 2017–18 | Amur Khabarovsk | KHL | 5 | 0 | 0 | 0 | 0 | — | — | — | — | — |
| 2017–18 | Amurskie Tigry | MHL | 2 | 1 | 1 | 2 | 0 | — | — | — | — | — |
| 2017–18 | Lokomotiv Yaroslavl | KHL | 13 | 0 | 0 | 0 | 4 | 2 | 0 | 0 | 0 | 0 |
| 2017–18 | HC Ryazan | VHL | 7 | 4 | 4 | 8 | 2 | — | — | — | — | — |
| 2017–18 | Loko Yaroslavl | MHL | 8 | 1 | 2 | 3 | 12 | 5 | 0 | 2 | 2 | 4 |
| 2018–19 | Lokomotiv Yaroslavl | KHL | 40 | 10 | 9 | 19 | 14 | 8 | 0 | 1 | 1 | 4 |
| 2019–20 | San Jose Sharks | NHL | 4 | 0 | 0 | 0 | 0 | — | — | — | — | — |
| 2019–20 | San Jose Barracuda | AHL | 38 | 2 | 15 | 17 | 12 | — | — | — | — | — |
| 2020–21 | CSKA Moscow | KHL | 11 | 1 | 2 | 3 | 0 | — | — | — | — | — |
| 2020–21 | Zvezda Moscow | VHL | 7 | 2 | 0 | 2 | 0 | 5 | 3 | 3 | 6 | 4 |
| 2021–22 | CSKA Moscow | KHL | 10 | 0 | 1 | 1 | 6 | 3 | 0 | 1 | 1 | 0 |
| 2021–22 | Zvezda Moscow | VHL | 1 | 0 | 0 | 0 | 0 | — | — | — | — | — |
| 2022–23 | CSKA Moscow | KHL | 23 | 3 | 7 | 10 | 2 | — | — | — | — | — |
| 2022–23 | Zvezda Moscow | VHL | 3 | 1 | 2 | 3 | 0 | — | — | — | — | — |
| 2023–24 | CSKA Moscow | KHL | 7 | 2 | 3 | 5 | 0 | — | — | — | — | — |
| 2023–24 | Zvezda Moscow | VHL | 4 | 0 | 3 | 3 | 0 | — | — | — | — | — |
| 2023–24 | Traktor Chelyabinsk | KHL | 45 | 8 | 14 | 22 | 14 | 11 | 2 | 2 | 4 | 0 |
| 2024–25 | Traktor Chelyabinsk | KHL | 12 | 0 | 3 | 3 | 4 | — | — | — | — | — |
| 2024–25 | Lada Togliatti | KHL | 31 | 9 | 6 | 15 | 4 | — | — | — | — | — |
| 2025–26 | Neftekhimik Nizhnekamsk | KHL | 35 | 6 | 20 | 26 | 6 | — | — | — | — | — |
| 2025–26 | Amur Khabarovsk | KHL | 19 | 3 | 3 | 6 | 4 | — | — | — | — | — |
| KHL totals | | | 251 | 42 | 68 | 110 | 58 | 24 | 2 | 4 | 6 | 4 |
| NHL totals | | | 4 | 0 | 0 | 0 | 0 | — | — | — | — | — |

=== International ===
Medal record

Representing Russia

Ice hockey

World Junior Championships
| Bronze medal – third place | 2017 Canada | |

| Year | Team | Event | GP | G | A | Pts | PIM |
|---|---|---|---|---|---|---|---|
| 2015 | Russia | U18 | 5 | 2 | 3 | 5 | 8 |
| 2017 | Russia | WJC | 5 | 1 | 2 | 3 | 2 |
| Junior totals | | | 10 | 3 | 5 | 8 | 10 |

== Awards and honours ==
| Award | Year |
|---|---|
MHL
| Kharlamov Cup (Loko Yaroslavl) | 2016, 2018 |
KHL
| Gagarin Cup (CSKA Moscow) | 2022, 2023 |
