= Parker Wotherspoon =

Canadian ice hockey player (born 1997)

- Born: August 24, 1997 (age 29) Surrey, British Columbia, Canada
- Height: 6 ft 1 in (185 cm)
- Weight: 190 lb (86 kg; 13 st 8 lb)
- Position: Defence
- Shoots: Left
- NHL team Former teams: Vegas Golden Knights; New York Islanders; Boston Bruins; Pittsburgh Penguins
- National team: Canada
- NHL draft: 112th overall, 2015; New York Islanders
- Playing career: 2016–present

Parker Wotherspoon (born August 24, 1997) is a Canadian professional ice hockey player who is a defenceman for the Vegas Golden Knights of the National Hockey League (NHL). He was selected by the New York Islanders in the fourth round, 112th overall, at the 2015 NHL entry draft. Wotherspoon played four seasons of junior hockey for the Western Hockey League's Tri-City Americans, and has also played in the NHL for the Boston Bruins and Pittsburgh Penguins.

== Playing career ==
On May 3, 2012, Wotherspoon was selected by the Tri-City Americans of the Western Hockey League (WHL) in the first round of the 2012 WHL bantam draft. He signed with Tri-City on May 29, 2012.

=== New York Islanders ===
Wotherspoon was drafted by the New York Islanders in the fourth round, 112th overall, of the 2015 NHL entry draft.

In April 2016, Wotherspoon made his professional debut for the Bridgeport Sound Tigers of the American Hockey League (AHL), after having signed an amateur tryout with Bridgeport. On May 2, 2016, the Islanders signed Wotherspoon to a three-year, entry-level contract.

Wotherspoon was named a WHL Western Conference Second Team All-Star for the 2016–17 WHL season.

On January 17, 2020, Wotherspoon received a match penalty for spearing Providence Bruins player Trent Frederic and received a one-game suspension.

Wotherspoon finished the 2019–20 AHL season with four goals and 23 assists in 62 games for Bridgeport.

On October 27, 2020, he signed a two-year contract extension with the Islanders.

Wotherspoon recorded three goals and 21 assists in 57 games for the Bridgeport Islanders during the 2021–22 AHL season.

On September 21, 2022, Wotherspoon re-signed with New York on a one-year contract. Wotherspoon made his NHL debut on December 23, 2022, playing for 14:47 minutes while recording two shots on goal and one hit in the Islanders' 5–1 win against the Florida Panthers.

=== Boston Bruins ===
Following six full seasons within the Islanders organization, Wotherspoon left as a free agent to sign a one-year, two-way contract with the Boston Bruins on July 1, 2023.

Although Wotherspoon initially started the 2023–24 season with the Bruins' American Hockey League (AHL) affiliate, the Providence Bruins, injuries to Boston's defense corps caused him to bounce between Providence and Boston for much of the first half of the season. However, his consistent stability on Boston's blue line earned him a permanent spot on the NHL squad as the team's seventh defenceman, as well as a one-year, $800,000 contract extension on March 8, 2024. In his first full season staying at the NHL level, Wotherspoon scored eight assists in 41 games. Wotherspoon made his NHL playoff debut in Game 3 of the first round against the Toronto Maple Leafs. Similarly as he had done in the regular season, once Wotherspoon was slotted into the playoff lineup, he found a consistent and stable role in the lineup. Wotherspoon would help the Bruins beat the Leafs in seven games, and would record his first NHL playoff point, an assist, in Game 1 of the second round against the Florida Panthers. However, the Panthers would eliminate the Bruins in six games, ending Wotherspoon's and the Bruins' season.

Wotherspoon entered the 2024–25 season making the NHL opening night roster for the first time in his career, primarily serving as the team's seventh defenseman. However, after injuries to Boston's defense corps, Wotherspoon stepped up to play a larger role. On January 14, 2025, Wotherspoon scored his first career NHL goal against Tampa Bay Lightning goalie Andrei Vasilevskiy. Wotherspoon ended the season with a goal and seven assists in 55 games, as the Bruins missed the playoffs.

=== Pittsburgh Penguins ===
Wotherspoon signed as a free agent to a two-year, $2 million contract with the Pittsburgh Penguins on July 1, 2025. Wotherspoon registered career highs across all categories, scoring three goals and 27 assists in 80 games with the Penguins.

=== Vegas Golden Knights ===
On June 30, 2026, Wotherspoon was traded to the Vegas Golden Knights in exchange for Kaedan Korczak, with 50 percent of Wotherspoon's $1 million salary retained by the Penguins.

== International play ==
Wotherspoon represented Canada Pacific at the 2014 World U-17 Hockey Challenge. He represented the Canada national under-18 team at the 2015 IIHF World U18 Championships.

== Personal life ==
Wotherspoon is the younger brother of Tyler Wotherspoon, who was selected 57th overall by the Calgary Flames at the 2011 NHL entry draft.

== Career statistics ==
=== Regular season and playoffs ===
			Regular season					Playoffs
Season	Team	League	GP	G	A	Pts	PIM	GP	G	A	Pts	PIM
2012–13	Tri-City Americans	WHL	5	0	0	0	4	2	0	0	0	0
2013–14	Tri-City Americans	WHL	62	2	16	18	74	5	0	2	2	2
2014–15	Tri-City Americans	WHL	72	9	33	42	93	4	0	1	1	4
2015–16	Tri-City Americans	WHL	71	11	45	56	78	—	—	—	—	—
2015–16	Bridgeport Sound Tigers	AHL	6	0	1	1	15	2	0	1	1	0
2016–17	Tri-City Americans	WHL	69	10	56	66	99	4	0	1	1	8
2016–17	Bridgeport Sound Tigers	AHL	4	0	0	0	4	—	—	—	—	—
2017–18	Bridgeport Sound Tigers	AHL	50	7	10	17	24	—	—	—	—	—
2018–19	Bridgeport Sound Tigers	AHL	64	6	17	23	51	5	0	0	0	2
2019–20	Bridgeport Sound Tigers	AHL	62	4	23	27	82	—	—	—	—	—
2020–21	Bridgeport Sound Tigers	AHL	23	1	3	4	35	—	—	—	—	—
2021–22	Bridgeport Islanders	AHL	57	3	21	24	127	6	0	1	1	4
2022–23	Bridgeport Islanders	AHL	27	1	11	12	27	—	—	—	—	—
2022–23	New York Islanders	NHL	12	0	1	1	4	—	—	—	—	—
2023–24	Providence Bruins	AHL	19	1	4	5	20	—	—	—	—	—
2023–24	Boston Bruins	NHL	41	0	8	8	31	10	0	2	2	6
2024–25	Boston Bruins	NHL	55	1	6	7	10	—	—	—	—	—
2025–26	Pittsburgh Penguins	NHL	80	3	27	30	55	6	0	1	1	12
NHL totals			188	4	42	46	100	16	0	3	3	18

=== International ===
Year	Team	Event	Result	GP	G	A	Pts	PIM
2014	Canada Pacific	U17	2nd place, silver medalist(s)	6	0	3	3	2
2015	Canada	U18	3rd place, bronze medalist(s)	7	1	4	5	6
2026	Canada	WC	4th	10	1	3	4	6
Junior totals				13	1	7	8	8
Senior totals				10	1	3	4	6

== Awards and honours ==
Award	Year	Ref
WHL
West Second All-Star Team	2017	
