= Jeremy Bracco =

American ice hockey player (born 1997)

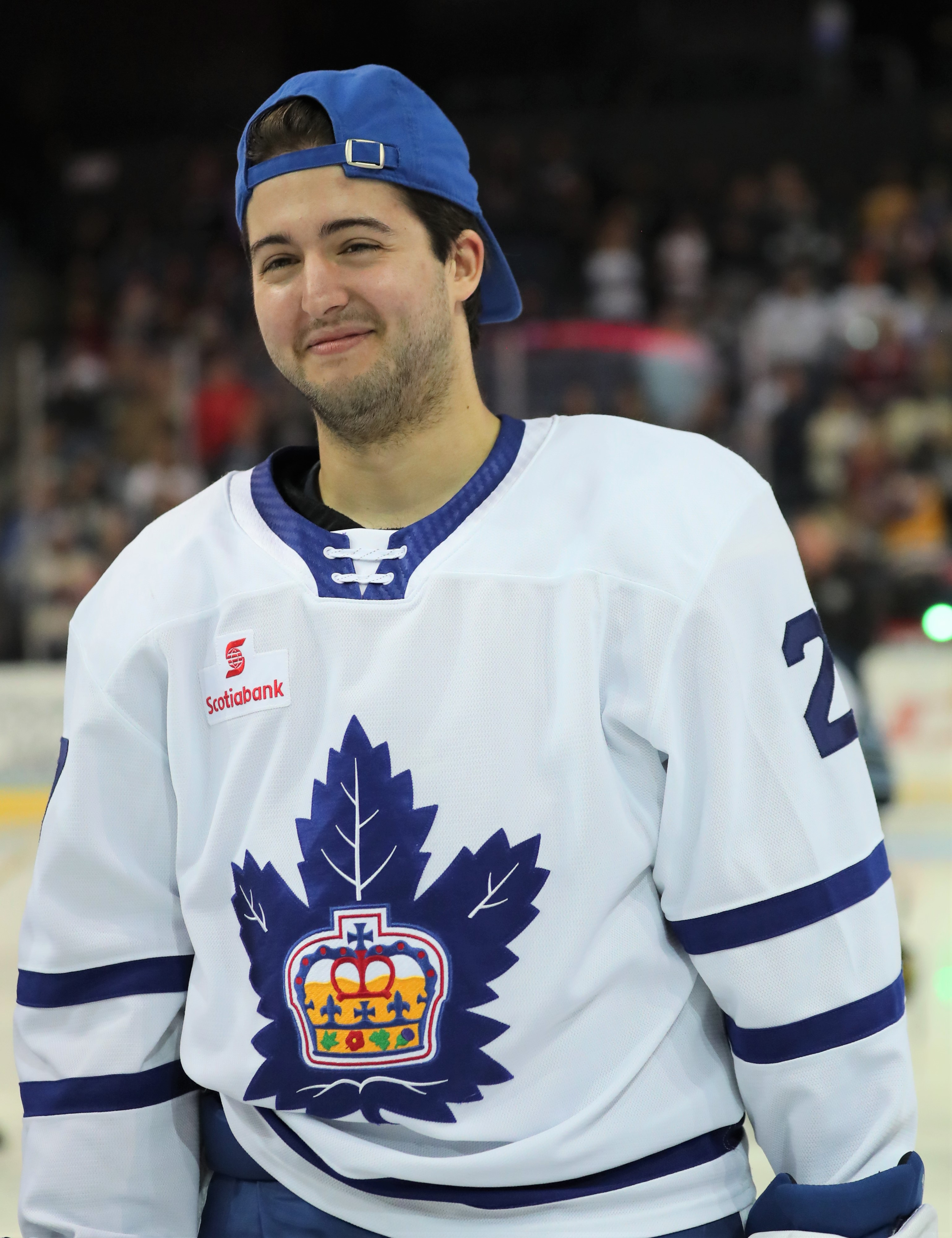
- Bracco with the Toronto Marlies in 2020
- Born: March 17, 1997 (age 29) Freeport, New York, U.S.
- Height: 5 ft 11 in (180 cm)
- Weight: 185 lb (84 kg; 13 st 3 lb)
- Position: Right wing
- Shoots: Right
- DEL2 team Former teams: Eisbären Regensburg; Toronto Marlies; KalPa; Krefeld Pinguine; Barys Astana; HC Sochi; HKM Zvolen; HC Innsbruck; HK Poprad
- NHL draft: 61st overall, 2015; Toronto Maple Leafs
- Playing career: 2017–present

Jeremy Bracco (born March 17, 1997) is an American professional ice hockey forward who plays for Eisbären Regensburg of the DEL2. He was selected by the Toronto Maple Leafs, 61st overall, in the 2015 NHL entry draft.

== Playing career ==
Bracco played high school hockey at Portledge School and before joining the USA Hockey National Team Development Program (U.S. NTDP). As a member of the U.S. NTDP, he played the 2013–14 and 2014–15 seasons in the United States Hockey League (USHL). Bracco's outstanding play was rewarded when he was invited to skate in the 2014 CCM/USA Hockey All-American Prospects Game.

Bracco committed to play the 2015–16 season with Boston College, but left the college after 5 games to join the Kitchener Rangers of the Ontario Hockey League (OHL).

After three seasons within the Maple Leafs organization, playing exclusively with AHL affiliate the Toronto Marlies, Bracco as an impending restricted free agent was not tendered a qualifying offer and was released to free agency.

On October 16, 2020, Bracco was signed to a one-year, two-way, league minimum contract with the Carolina Hurricanes. After attending the Hurricanes training camp for the pandemic delayed 2020–21 season, Bracco was unable to make the roster and was reassigned to AHL affiliate, the Chicago Wolves. Prior to the beginning of the AHL season, having secured a lucrative offer abroad, Bracco was placed on unconditional waivers in order to mutually terminate his contract with the Hurricanes on January 26, 2021. He was immediately announced to have signed a European contract for the remainder of the season with Finnish outfit KalPa of the Liiga.

After spending the 2021–22 season in Germany with Krefeld Pinguine of the Deutsche Eishockey Liga (DEL), Bracco having been unable to help the club avoid relegation, left as a free agent.

On July 20, 2022, Bracco agreed to a one-year contract with Kazakh-based KHL club, Barys Nur-Sultan, for the 2022–23 season.

== International play ==
Bracco competed as a member of Team USA at the 2015 IIHF World U18 Championships, where he assisted on the overtime game-winning goal to defeat Finland in the gold medal game.

== Career statistics ==
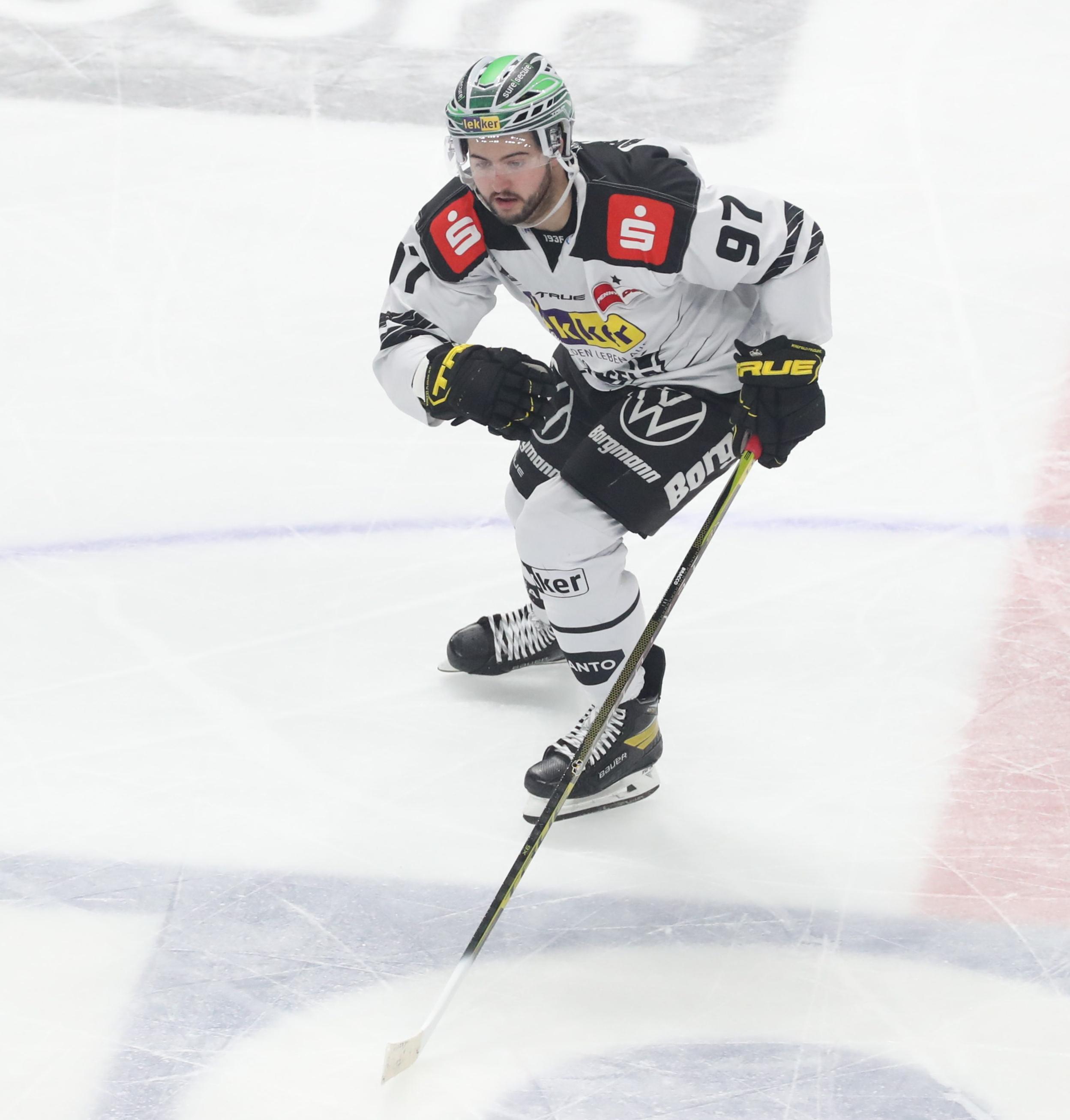
Bracco with Krefeld Pinguine (2022)

=== Regular season and playoffs ===
			Regular season					Playoffs
Season	Team	League	GP	G	A	Pts	PIM	GP	G	A	Pts	PIM
2010–11	Portledge School	USHS	17	6	7	13	0	—	—	—	—	—
2011–12	Portledge School	USHS	20	15	27	42	6	—	—	—	—	—
2012–13	Portledge School	USHS	11	12	12	24	8	—	—	—	—	—
2012–13	New Jersey Rockets	MetJHL	10	9	15	24	0	—	—	—	—	—
2012–13	New Jersey Rockets	AtJHL	30	16	34	50	24	4	2	4	6	0
2013–14	U.S. NTDP Juniors	USHL	34	9	28	37	10	—	—	—	—	—
2013–14	U.S. NTDP U17	USDP	54	16	58	74	20	—	—	—	—	—
2014–15	U.S. NTDP Juniors	USHL	24	14	18	32	6	—	—	—	—	—
2014–15	U.S. NTDP U18	USDP	65	30	64	94	10	—	—	—	—	—
2015–16	Boston College	HE	5	0	3	3	4	—	—	—	—	—
2015–16	Kitchener Rangers	OHL	49	21	43	64	19	9	3	11	14	0
2016–17	Kitchener Rangers	OHL	27	17	34	51	4	—	—	—	—	—
2016–17	Windsor Spitfires	OHL	30	8	24	32	2	7	2	3	5	0
2017–18	Toronto Marlies	AHL	50	6	26	32	10	4	1	0	1	0
2018–19	Toronto Marlies	AHL	75	22	57	79	16	13	4	12	16	2
2019–20	Toronto Marlies	AHL	44	4	30	34	2	—	—	—	—	—
2020–21	KalPa	Liiga	24	2	15	17	0	4	0	2	2	0
2021–22	Krefeld Pinguine	DEL	54	14	40	54	6	—	—	—	—	—
2022–23	Barys Astana	KHL	59	14	26	40	4	—	—	—	—	—
2023–24	Barys Astana	KHL	6	1	0	1	0	—	—	—	—	—
2023–24	HC Sochi	KHL	33	8	7	15	6	—	—	—	—	—
AHL totals			169	32	113	145	28	17	5	12	17	2
KHL totals			98	23	33	56	10	—	—	—	—	—

Medal record

Representing United States

Ice hockey

World Junior Championships
Gold medal – first place	2017 Canada	

IIHF World U18 Championship
Gold medal – first place	2015 Switzerland	

=== International ===
Year	Team	Event	Result	GP	G	A	Pts	PIM
2014	United States	U17	1st place, gold medalist(s)	6	3	8	11	4
2015	United States	U18	1st place, gold medalist(s)	7	3	10	13	2
2017	United States	WJC	1st place, gold medalist(s)	7	3	2	5	0
Junior totals				20	9	20	29	6

== Awards and honours ==
Award	Year
AtJHL
Rookie of the Year	2013
CHL
Memorial Cup (Windsor Spitfires)	2017
AHL
Calder Cup (Toronto Marlies)	2018
All-Star Game	2019
First All-Star Team	2019
