= Vili Saarijärvi =

Finnish ice hockey player (born 1997)

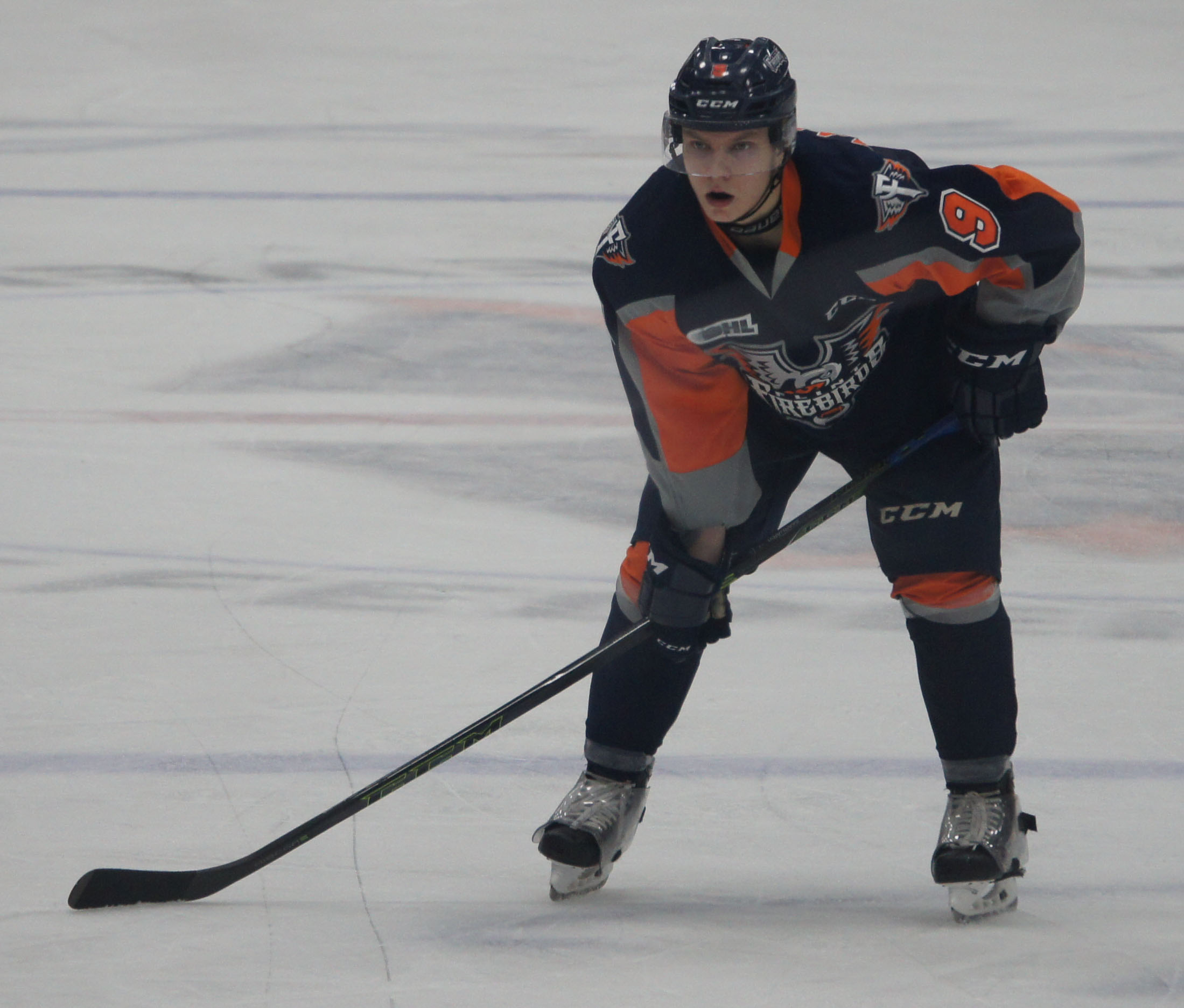
- Saarijärvi with the Flint Firebirds in 2016
- Born: 15 May 1997 (age 29) Rovaniemi, Finland
- Height: 5 ft 10 in (178 cm)
- Weight: 183 lb (83 kg; 13 st 1 lb)
- Position: Defence
- Shoots: Right
- NL team Former teams: Genève-Servette HC; Lukko; SCL Tigers
- National team: Finland
- NHL draft: 73rd overall, 2015; Detroit Red Wings
- Playing career: 2017–present

Vili Saarijärvi (born 15 May 1997) is a Finnish professional ice hockey player who is a defenceman for Genève-Servette HC of the National League (NL). He was drafted 73rd overall by the Detroit Red Wings in the 2015 NHL entry draft.

== Playing career ==
During the 2014–15 season, Saarijärvi recorded six goals and 17 assists in 57 games for the Green Bay Gamblers, leading the Gamblers' defenceman in scoring, and finishing tied for 20th in scoring among all USHL defenceman. His first career USHL goal was a game-winning overtime goal on 4 October 2014, against the Chicago Steel. Following an outstanding season, Saarijärvi was named to the All-Rookie Second Team.

On 30 June 2015, Saarijärvi was drafted 9th overall by the Flint Firebirds in the CHL Import Draft. On 12 August 2015, the Firebirds signed Saarijärvi to an Ontario Hockey League (OHL) contract for the 2015–16 season. Saarijärvi played his first career OHL game with the Firebirds on 24 September 2015, where he recorded his first career OHL point, an assist, in a game against the Saginaw Spirit. On 24 June 2016, Saarijärvi was traded to the Mississauga Steelheads in exchange for Everett Clark, a second-round pick in the 2017 OHL Priority Selection, a fifth-round pick in the 2019 OHL Priority Selection and a conditional second-round pick in the 2023 OHL Priority Selection. During the 2016–17 season, he recorded 11 goals and 20 assists in 34 games for the Steelheads.

On 3 July 2015, the Detroit Red Wings signed Saarijärvi to a three-year, entry-level contract. During the 2017–18 season, in his first full professional season in North America, Saarijärvi split time between the ECHL's Toledo Walleye and the AHL's Grand Rapids Griffins. He made his AHL debut for the Griffins on 28 October 2017, and recorded his first career AHL point, an assist. In 10 games with the Walleye, he had two goals and four assists. In 42 games with the Griffins, he had 11 assists. During the 2018–19 season, in his second full professional season in North America, Saarijärvi recorded two goals, 14 assists, and a team-leading plus-19 rating, in 70 games for the Grand Rapids Griffins. He recorded his first career AHL goal on 20 October 2019 in a game against the Chicago Wolves.

On 30 November 2019, Saarijärvi was traded to the Arizona Coyotes in exchange for Eric Comrie. Prior to being traded, he recorded one assist in 13 games with the Griffins. On 2 December 2019, he was assigned to the Coyotes' AHL affiliate, the Tucson Roadrunners. He finished the season with six assists in 25 games for the Roadrunners.

On 15 May 2020, Saarijärvi signed with Lukko of the Finnish Liiga.

On 28 February 2023, the Coyotes traded Saarijärvi's rights to the Chicago Blackhawks in a three-team trade.

== International play ==
Medal record

Men's ice hockey

Representing Finland

World Championships
Gold medal – first place	2026 Switzerland	

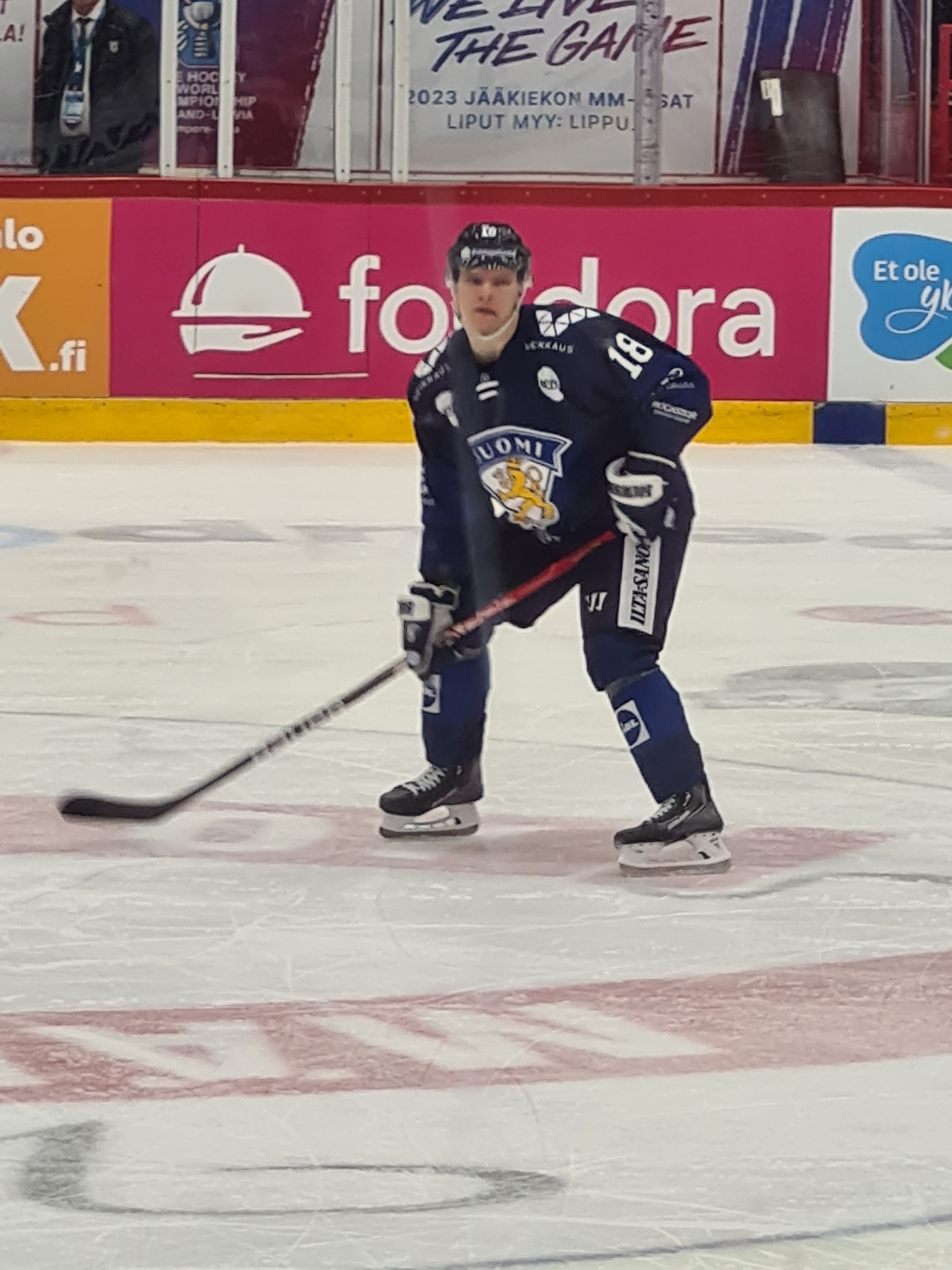
Saarijärvi with Team Finland in 2023

Saarijärvi represented Finland at the 2015 IIHF World U18 Championships, where he led all defenceman in scoring, recording three goals and six assists in seven games, and won a silver medal. He was selected as the tournament's best defenceman and was named to the 2015 IIHF World U18 Championship All-Star Team.

== Career statistics ==
=== Regular season and playoffs ===
			Regular season					Playoffs
Season	Team	League	GP	G	A	Pts	PIM	GP	G	A	Pts	PIM
2012–13	Oulun Kärpät	FIN U20	3	0	1	1	0	2	0	0	0	4
2013–14	Oulun Kärpät	FIN U20	40	7	21	28	10	12	1	0	1	6
2014–15	Green Bay Gamblers	USHL	57	6	17	23	14	—	—	—	—	—
2015–16	Flint Firebirds	OHL	59	12	31	43	32	—	—	—	—	—
2015–16	Toledo Walleye	ECHL	5	1	3	4	0	—	—	—	—	—
2016–17	Mississauga Steelheads	OHL	34	11	20	31	14	20	5	10	15	8
2017–18	Grand Rapids Griffins	AHL	42	0	11	11	10	1	0	0	0	0
2017–18	Toledo Walleye	ECHL	10	2	4	6	2	—	—	—	—	—
2018–19	Grand Rapids Griffins	AHL	70	2	14	16	20	1	1	0	1	0
2019–20	Grand Rapids Griffins	AHL	13	0	1	1	2	—	—	—	—	—
2019–20	Tucson Roadrunners	AHL	25	0	6	6	4	—	—	—	—	—
2020–21	Lukko	Liiga	50	9	27	36	26	11	0	7	7	4
2021–22	Lukko	Liiga	52	17	26	43	12	7	2	1	3	4
2022–23	SCL Tigers	NL	49	11	22	33	12	—	—	—	—	—
2023–24	SCL Tigers	NL	50	8	29	37	10	—	—	—	—	—
2024–25	SCL Tigers	NL	46	3	22	25	6	9	4	2	6	4
2025–26	Genève-Servette HC	NL	51	5	32	37	38	12	2	5	7	8
Liiga totals			102	26	53	79	38	18	2	8	10	8
NL totals			196	27	105	132	66	21	6	7	13	12

=== International ===
Year	Team	Event	Result	GP	G	A	Pts	PIM
2014	Finland	IH18	5th	4	1	3	4	2
2015	Finland	U18	2nd place, silver medalist(s)	7	3	6	9	4
2016	Finland	WJC	1st place, gold medalist(s)	7	0	4	4	2
2017	Finland	WJC	9th	6	2	2	4	2
2024	Finland	WC	8th	8	0	1	1	0
2025	Finland	WC	7th	8	1	4	5	0
2026	Finland	WC	1st place, gold medalist(s)	10	0	3	3	0
Junior totals				24	6	15	21	10
Senior totals				26	1	8	9	0
