= Rasmus Asplund =

Swedish ice hockey player (born 1997)

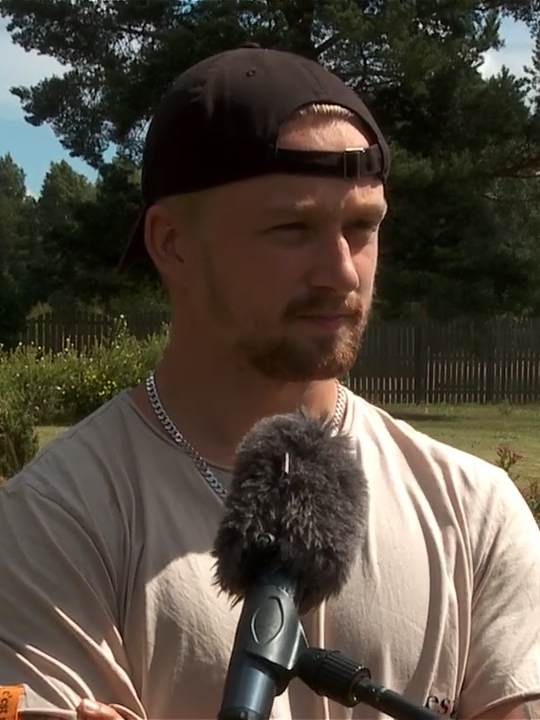
- Asplund in 2020
- Born: 3 December 1997 (age 28) Filipstad, Sweden
- Height: 5 ft 11 in (180 cm)
- Weight: 190 lb (86 kg; 13 st 8 lb)
- Position: Forward
- Shoots: Left
- NL team Former teams: HC Davos; Färjestad BK; Buffalo Sabres; Nashville Predators; Florida Panthers
- National team: Sweden
- NHL draft: 33rd overall, 2016; Buffalo Sabres
- Playing career: 2014–present

Rasmus Asplund (born 3 December 1997) is a Swedish professional ice hockey player who is a forward for HC Davos of the National League (NL). He was drafted by the Buffalo Sabres in the second round, 33rd overall, of the 2016 NHL entry draft.

== Playing career ==
Asplund made his Swedish Hockey League debut playing with Färjestad BK during the 2014–15 SHL season.

Following his fourth SHL season, Asplund signed a three-year, entry-level contract with the Buffalo Sabres on 23 May 2018.

On 16 September 2020, with the North American set to be delayed due to the COVID-19 pandemic, Asplund remained in Sweden to begin playing on loan from the Sabres with Västerås IK of the HockeyAllsvenskan. He recorded 9 points through 14 games in the second tier Allsvenskan before ending his loan and returning to the Sabres.

Asplund was considered one of the top two-way forward prospects in the NHL following the 2021–22 season. Asplund posted strong defensive metrics on his way to finishing in the top 20 for the 2021–22 Frank J. Selke Trophy, awarded to the top defensive forward.

In the following 2022–23 season, Asplund, in a reduced role due to the Sabres' emerging forward depth, was limited to just 27 regular season games, collecting two goals and eight points. At the NHL trade deadline, Asplund was traded by the Sabres to the Nashville Predators in exchange for a seventh-round draft pick in the 2024 NHL entry draft on 3 March 2023.

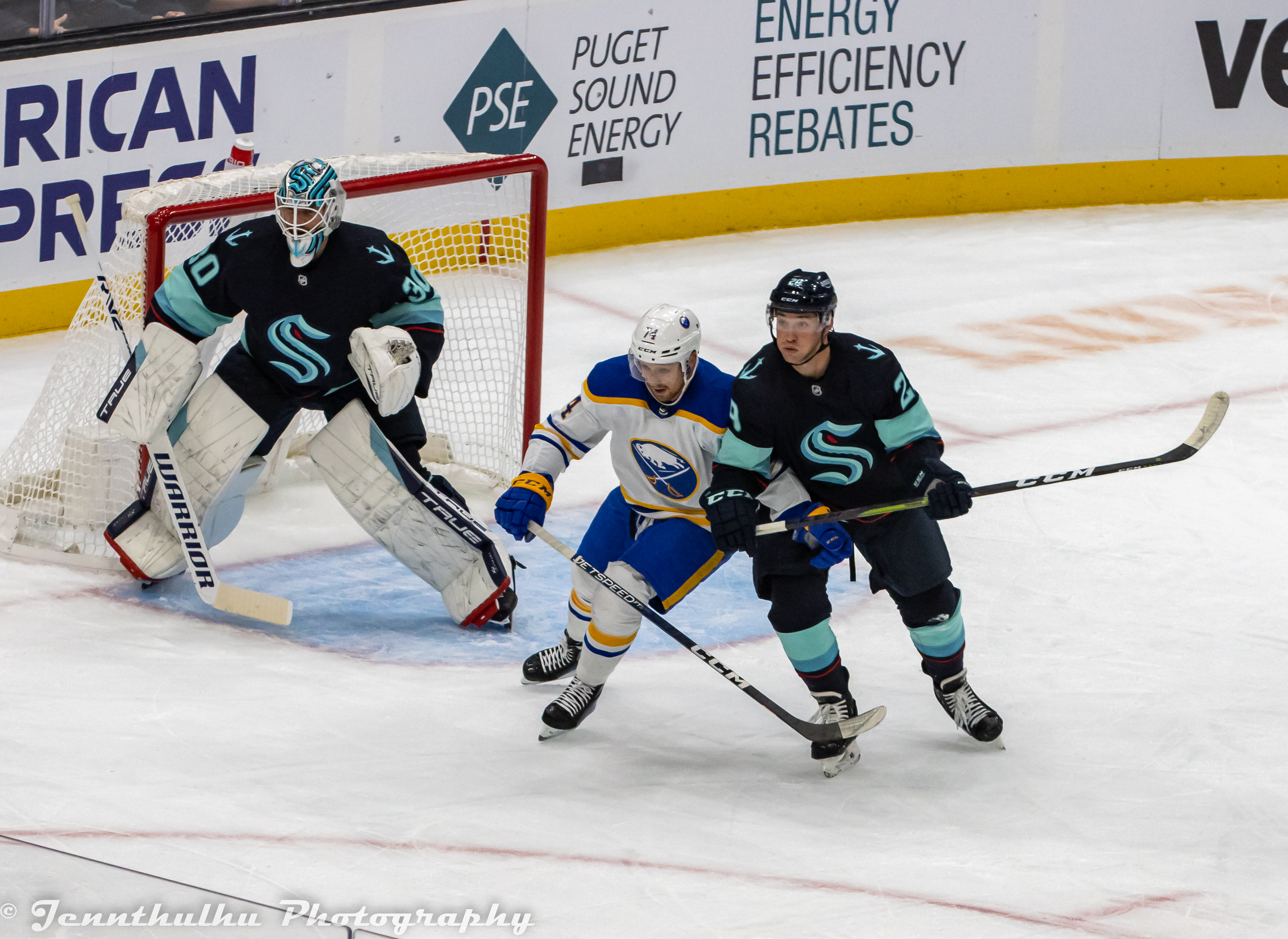
Asplund battling for position against Vince Dunn of the Seattle Kraken in 2022.

Leaving the Predators after failing to receive a qualifying offer, Asplund was signed as a free agent on a one-year, two-way contract with the Florida Panthers on 5 July 2023.

After two seasons within the Panthers organization, Asplund left at the conclusion of his contract and returned to Europe in agreeing to a two-year contract with Swiss-based, HC Davos of the NL, on 1 July 2025.

== Personal life ==
Asplund and his wife Sandra have one son together.

== Career statistics ==
=== Regular season and playoffs ===
			Regular season					Playoffs
Season	Team	League	GP	G	A	Pts	PIM	GP	G	A	Pts	PIM
2013–14	Färjestad BK	J20	38	7	7	14	12	4	1	0	1	0
2014–15	Färjestad BK	J20	19	8	17	25	14	6	3	4	7	0
2014–15	Färjestad BK	SHL	35	2	1	3	4	3	0	0	0	0
2015–16	Färjestad BK	SHL	46	4	8	12	16	3	0	0	0	0
2016–17	Färjestad BK	SHL	39	6	13	19	10	5	0	3	3	0
2017–18	Färjestad BK	SHL	50	8	20	28	20	6	0	0	0	6
2018–19	Rochester Americans	AHL	75	10	31	41	26	3	0	0	0	0
2019–20	Rochester Americans	AHL	33	3	16	19	2	—	—	—	—	—
2019–20	Buffalo Sabres	NHL	29	1	2	3	6	—	—	—	—	—
2020–21	Västerås IK	Allsv	14	4	5	9	6	—	—	—	—	—
2020–21	Buffalo Sabres	NHL	28	7	4	11	0	—	—	—	—	—
2020–21	Rochester Americans	AHL	3	0	2	2	0	—	—	—	—	—
2021–22	Buffalo Sabres	NHL	80	8	19	27	10	—	—	—	—	—
2022–23	Buffalo Sabres	NHL	27	2	6	8	0	—	—	—	—	—
2022–23	Nashville Predators	NHL	19	0	0	0	4	—	—	—	—	—
2023–24	Charlotte Checkers	AHL	67	9	35	44	22	3	1	0	1	4
2024–25	Charlotte Checkers	AHL	63	20	23	43	21	18	5	4	9	6
2024–25	Florida Panthers	NHL	6	0	0	0	2	—	—	—	—	—
SHL totals			170	20	42	62	50	17	0	3	3	6
NHL totals			189	18	31	49	22	—	—	—	—	—

=== International ===
Year	Team	Event	Result	GP	G	A	Pts	PIM
2014	Sweden	U17	6th	5	1	1	2	0
2014	Sweden	IH18	4th	5	2	1	3	4
2015	Sweden	U18	8th	5	2	3	5	8
2016	Sweden	WJC	4th	7	3	2	5	6
2017	Sweden	WJC	4th	7	1	6	7	0
2022	Sweden	WC	6th	8	6	0	6	2
2026	Sweden	WC	7th	8	0	0	0	4
Junior totals				29	9	13	22	18
Senior totals				16	6	0	6	6
