= Jonne Tammela =

Finnish ice hockey player

- Born: 5 August 1997 (age 28) Ylivieska, Finland
- Height: 5 ft 11 in (180 cm)
- Weight: 186 lb (84 kg; 13 st 4 lb)
- Position: Right wing
- Shoots: Left
- Liiga team Former teams: Porin Ässät; KalPa; Syracuse Crunch; Lukko; HC TPS; SaiPa
- NHL draft: 118th overall, 2015; Tampa Bay Lightning
- Playing career: 2014–present

Jonne Tammela (born 5 August 1997) is a Finnish professional ice hockey forward who is currently playing for Porin Ässät of the Liiga. He formerly played with the Syracuse Crunch in the American Hockey League (AHL) as a prospect to the Tampa Bay Lightning of the National Hockey League (NHL).

== Playing career ==
On 28 October 2014, at the age of 17, Tammela made his senior Liiga debut playing with KalPa during the 2014–15 season. He was then selected by the Tampa Bay Lightning in the fourth round, 118th overall, in the 2015 NHL entry draft.

On 1 April 2016, Tammela signed a three-year, entry-level contract with the Tampa Bay Lightning. He returned to KalPa and played out the 2015–16 season before joining the Lightning's AHL affiliate, the Syracuse Crunch for 3 games.

In order to pursue his NHL aspirations, he opted to continue his development in North America at the major junior level. He was originally the 15th import draft pick selected by the Peterborough Petes of the Ontario Hockey League in 2015. Tammela appeared in just two games with the Petes in the 2016–17 season before suffering a long-term injury.

Continuing his rehabilitation into the 2017–18 season, Tammela's junior rights were traded by the Petes to the Sault Ste. Marie Greyhounds on 9 January 2018. Upon returning to health, he re-joined the professional ranks by accepting an assignment to the Syracuse Crunch on January 12, 2018.

After bouncing between the ECHL and AHL during the 2018–19 season, his contract was terminated by the Lightning on 24 May 2019. He returned to Finland to continue his career in the Liiga, agreeing to a two-year contract with Lukko on 28 May 2019.

== Career statistics ==
=== Regular season and playoffs ===
			Regular season					Playoffs
Season	Team	League	GP	G	A	Pts	PIM	GP	G	A	Pts	PIM
2012–13	JYP	Jr. A	10	1	2	3	18	3	1	0	1	0
2013–14	KalPa	Jr. A	24	5	11	16	12	—	—	—	—	—
2014–15	KalPa	Jr. A	26	11	16	27	26	—	—	—	—	—
2014–15	KalPa	Liiga	32	4	0	4	6	4	0	0	0	4
2015–16	KalPa	Liiga	37	5	8	13	16	3	0	0	0	2
2015–16	KalPa	Jr. A	—	—	—	—	—	8	2	3	5	6
2015–16	Syracuse Crunch	AHL	3	0	1	1	0	—	—	—	—	—
2016–17	Peterborough Petes	OHL	2	1	0	1	0	—	—	—	—	—
2017–18	Syracuse Crunch	AHL	28	3	3	6	16	—	—	—	—	—
2018–19	Syracuse Crunch	AHL	20	1	3	4	8	—	—	—	—	—
2018–19	Orlando Solar Bears	ECHL	23	13	13	26	18	9	1	4	5	19
2019–20	Lukko	Liiga	59	17	13	30	42	—	—	—	—	—
2020–21	Lukko	Liiga	53	13	8	21	24	11	2	1	3	2
2021–22	TPS	Liiga	37	12	6	18	41	9	0	2	2	25
Liiga totals			218	51	35	86	129	27	2	3	5	33

=== International ===
Year	Team	Event	Result	GP	G	A	Pts	PIM
2014	Finland	IH18	6th	4	1	0	1	4
2015	Finland	U18	2nd place, silver medalist(s)	7	1	4	5	4
Junior totals				11	2	4	6	8
