= Veini Vehviläinen =

Finnish ice hockey player

- Born: 13 February 1997 (age 29) Jyväskylä, Finland
- Height: 6 ft 0 in (183 cm)
- Weight: 183 lb (83 kg; 13 st 1 lb)
- Position: Goaltender
- Catches: Left
- Mestis team Former teams: Jokerit; JYP Jyväskylä; Vaasan Sport; Oulun Kärpät; Columbus Blue Jackets; Brynäs IF; TPS
- National team: Finland
- NHL draft: 173rd overall, 2018; Columbus Blue Jackets
- Playing career: 2014–present

Veini Vehviläinen (born 13 February 1997) is a Finnish professional ice hockey goaltender. He is currently playing with Jokerit of the Mestis. He was selected in the sixth round, 173rd overall, by the Columbus Blue Jackets in the 2018 NHL entry draft.

== Playing career ==
Vehviläinen began playing as a youth within JYP Jyväskylä, playing in the junior ranks, he impressively backstopped the under 20 team in the Jr. A SM-liiga as a 16-year old in the 2013–14 season.

Vehviläinen made his professional debut in the Mestis with JYP-Akatemia in the 2014–15 season, before stepping up to the Liiga with JYP in the following 2015–16 season.

On 18 April 2017, Vehviläinen left JYP and secured a two-year contract with Oulun Kärpät.

Establishing himself as the youngest starting goaltender in the Liiga, Vehviläinen quick ascension as the Liiga's best goaltender was realised in the 2017–18 season with Kärpät. He finished second in goals against average and save percentage, finishing with 20 wins in 35 games. He helped Kärpät capture the Kanada-malja championship, posting 11 wins and 3 shutouts in 17 playoff games. He was named to the Liiga All-Star Team and captured the Urpo Ylönen trophy as the league's best goaltender.

After his selection by the Columbus Blue Jackets, 173rd overall, in the 2018 NHL entry draft, Vehviläinen returned to play with Oulun Kärpät for the 2018–19 season. In backstopping the league leading Oulun Kärpät, Vehviläinen continued his stellar play leading the league in GAA and SV% while also posting a Liiga best 25 wins and 6 shutouts. He helped Oulun Kärpät return to the Championship finals, leading all goaltenders with a 1.47 GAA and 4 shutouts. He finished with a 11–6 record before falling to HPK.

On 4 June 2019, Vehviläinen at the conclusion of his contract with Kärpät agreed to a two-year, entry-level contract with the Columbus Blue Jackets.

With the following 2020–21 NHL season delayed due to the COVID-19 pandemic, Vehviläinen opted to continue playing in Europe after accepting a loan assignment from the Blue Jackets to play with former Finnish club, JYP Jyväskylä of the Liiga, on 8 September 2020.

With the commencement of the North American season, Vehviläinen was assigned by the Blue Jackets returning to AHL affiliate, the Cleveland Monsters. After one game with the Monsters, Vehviläinen was initially recalled by the Blue Jackets to the taxi squad before making his NHL debut in relief of Joonas Korpisalo, allowing 1 goal in the 11 minutes remaining of a 5–0 defeat to the Dallas Stars on 6 March 2021. Reassigned to the Monsters, Vehviläinen was traded by the Blue Jackets to the Toronto Maple Leafs in exchange for Mikko Lehtonen on 12 March 2021. He was immediately assigned to continue in the AHL with the Toronto Marlies. In four appearances with the Marlies, he collected 1 win.

As a free agent from the Maple Leafs, Vehviläinen halted his North American career in agreeing to sign a one-year contract with Swedish club, Brynäs IF of the Swedish Hockey League (SHL), on 26 July 2021.

Entering his second season with Brynäs IF, Vehviläinen was winless in 5 games to open the 2022–23 season, before opting to leave the club and the SHL in order to return to his original Finnish club, JYP Jyväskylä of the Liiga, by agreeing to a three-year contract on 11 September 2022.

Vehviläinen returned to Finland and to his parent club JYP in November 2022, as he had previously terminated his contract with Brynäs. In December 2024, Vehviläinen's contract with JYP, which was originally due to last until spring 2025, was terminated after Vehviläinen remained the third goalkeeper.

A few days later, Vehviläinen moved to the ranks of the Liiga club TPS on a contract lasting until 11 January 2025, where he eventually played the rest of the season.

Vehviläinen did not sign an extension with TPS and remained unemployed. In October 2025, Vehviläinen initially signed a short-term contract with the Helsinki Jokerit team, which plays in the Mesti, until he signed a contract with the Jokerit team for the rest of the season.

== International play ==
Medal record

Ice hockey

Representing Finland

World Championships
Gold medal – first place	2019 Slovakia	

World Junior Championships
Gold medal – first place	2016 Finland	

World U18 Championships
Silver medal – second place	2015 Switzerland	

Vehviläinen represented Finland at the 2015 IIHF World U18 Championships, where played seven games, posting a 1.65 goals against average and a .949 save percentage, to backstop Team Finland to a silver medal. He was named to the 2015 IIHF World U18 Championship All-Star Team as the tournament's best goaltender.

At the 2019 IIHF World Championship Vehviläinen played one game against United States in the group stage. Finland went on to win the tournament earning Vehviläinen the gold medal.

== Career statistics ==
=== Regular season and playoffs ===
			Regular season									Playoffs
Season	Team	League	GP	W	L	OT	MIN	GA	SO	GAA	SV%	GP	W	L	MIN	GA	SO	GAA	SV%
2012–13	JYP Jyväskylä	Jr. A	1	—	—	—	—	—	—	3.23	.933	—	—	—	—	—	—	—	—
2013–14	JYP Jyväskylä	Jr. A	29	—	—	—	—	—	—	2.89	.919	—	—	—	—	—	—	—	—
2014–15	JYP Jyväskylä	Jr. A	17	—	—	—	—	—	—	3.09	.918	—	—	—	—	—	—	—	—
2014–15	JYP-Akatemia	Mestis	26	—	—	—	—	—	—	2.57	.917	4	—	—	—	—	—	2.56	.922
2015–16	JYP Jyväskylä	Liiga	28	15	7	4	1649	56	3	2.04	.925	3	0	2	146	9	0	3.70	.796
2015–16	JYP-Akatemia	Mestis	7	—	—	—	—	—	—	2.92	.925	—	—	—	—	—	—	—	—
2016–17	JYP Jyväskylä	Liiga	9	2	5	2	499	19	0	2.29	.912	—	—	—	—	—	—	—	—
2016–17	JYP-Akatemia	Mestis	7	2	4	1	393	16	0	2.45	.904	—	—	—	—	—	—	—	—
2016–17	Vaasan Sport	Liiga	9	2	5	2	538	19	0	2.12	.923	—	—	—	—	—	—	—	—
2017–18	Oulun Kärpät	Liiga	35	20	5	8	2030	64	4	1.89	.925	17	11	4	364	26	3	1.57	.933
2018–19	Oulun Kärpät	Liiga	38	25	8	5	2290	60	6	1.58	.933	17	11	6	1057	25	4	1.47	.939
2019–20	Cleveland Monsters	AHL	33	10	18	4	1915	88	3	2.76	.901	—	—	—	—	—	—	—	—
2020–21	JYP Jyväskylä	Liiga	13	3	7	3	793	42	1	3.18	.890	—	—	—	—	—	—	—	—
2020–21	Cleveland Monsters	AHL	1	0	1	0	59	3	0	3.05	.875	—	—	—	—	—	—	—	—
2020–21	Columbus Blue Jackets	NHL	1	0	0	0	11	1	0	5.63	.750	—	—	—	—	—	—	—	—
2020–21	Toronto Marlies	AHL	4	1	3	0	221	12	0	3.26	.908	—	—	—	—	—	—	—	—
2021–22	Brynäs IF	SHL	45	21	23	0	2601	101	5	2.33	.907	3	1	2	160	6	1	2.25	.906
2022–23	Brynäs IF	SHL	5	0	4	0	260	18	0	4.15	.854	—	—	—	—	—	—	—	—
Liiga totals			132	67	37	24	7,799	260	14	2.00	.923	37	22	12	2,198	60	7	1.64	.929
NHL totals			1	0	0	0	11	1	0	5.63	.750	—	—	—	—	—	—	—	—

=== International ===
Year	Team	Event	Result	GP	W	L	OT	MIN	GA	SO	GAA	SV%
2014	Finland	IH18	5th	2	1	1	0	120	11	0	5.50	.841
2015	Finland	U18	2nd place, silver medalist(s)	7	5	1	1	437	12	1	1.65	.949
2016	Finland	WJC	1st place, gold medalist(s)	4	2	1	0	206	13	1	3.79	.838
2017	Finland	WJC	9th	6	3	2	0	318	8	1	1.51	.931
2019	Finland	WC	1st place, gold medalist(s)	1	0	0	1	64	3	0	2.82	.897
Junior totals				19	11	5	1	1081	44	3	2.44	.922
Senior totals				1	0	0	1	64	3	0	2.82	.897

== Awards and honours ==
Award	Year
Liiga
All-Star Team	2018
Urpo Ylönen trophy	2018
Kanada-malja (Oulun Kärpät)	2018
Best GAA (1.58)	2019
Best SVS% (.923)	2019
International
WJC18 Silver Medal	2015
WJC18 All-Star Team	2015
