= Peter Valent =

Austrian hematologist and stem cell researcher

- Born: 9 October 1962 (age 63); Vienna, Austria
- Education: Medical University of Vienna
- Scientific career
- Fields: Hematology

Peter Valent (born 9 October 1962 in Vienna, Austria) is an Austrian hematologist and stem cell researcher. Since 1990 he leads a research group at the Medical University of Vienna. From 2002 he coordinates the European Competence Network on Mastocytosis and since 2008 he is the Scientific Director of the Ludwig Boltzmann Institute for Hematology and Oncology of the Ludwig Boltzmann Society in Austria.

== Life and education ==
Valent studied medicine at the Medical University of Vienna and graduated in 1987. He is a specialist in internal medicine and hematology and was promoted to Assistant Professor for Experimental Hematology in 1992 and Associate Professor for Internal Medicine in 1995. Valent visited several universities in Germany as Guest Scientist, including the Institute of Pathology of the University of Tübingen, the University Medical Center Schleswig Holstein (Campus Lübeck), and LMU Munich.

== Scientific contributions ==
=== Mast cell research and the classification of mastocytosis ===
Between 1989 and 1999 Valent examined the phenotype and growth characteristics of human mast cells. He found that mast cells form a unique lineage in the hematopoietic cell system. In subsequent studies, neoplastic mast cells were characterized. The resulting data contributed essentially to the development of diagnostic criteria and the WHO classification of mastocytosis. In 2000, Valent organized a Working Conference on Mastocytosis to implement this classification together with an international consensus group. Since 2002 Valent coordinates the European Competence Network on Mastocytosis that expanded rapidly and provides a useful basis for the development and conduct of studies and activities in the field of mastocytosis. In the forthcoming years, the diagnostic WHO criteria of mastocytosis were validated, adjusted and extended. To discuss these developments, Valent and his team organized additional conferences in Vienna, including a Working Conference on Standards and Standardization of Diagnostic Criteria and Therapies in Mastocytosis and one on the Global Classification of Mast Cell Disorders and Mast Cell Activation Syndromes (2010).

=== Additional scientific contributions ===
One additional focus in Valent's research is the neoplastic stem cell, also termed cancer stem cell in the context of cancer and leukemic stem cell in leukemia contexts. Valent investigates the phenotype of these cells in various hematologic neoplasms and develops concepts predicting the step-wise development of these cells from normal stem cells. The major aim in his research is to identify molecular targets in these cells and to develop more effective (curative) therapies by eliminating these cells in various blood cell disorders, including Acute Myeloid Leukemia, Chronic Myeloid Leukemia, Systemic Mastocytosis and Myelodysplastic Syndromes. These studies are primarily conducted in the Ludwig Boltzmann Institute for Hematology and Oncology at the Medical University of Vienna.

Valent is a member of numerous scientific organizations and has published over 850 publications since 1988, including more than 500 original papers, over 200 review articles and numerous book contributions. He also published numerous textbook chapters. In 2001, 2008 and 2016 he drew book chapters on mastocytosis as the author of the WHO. Peter Valent is one of the most frequently cited scientists from German-speaking countries in the field of immunology from 2011 to 2015. In Austria, he is one of the top 5 scientists in the field of medicine (as of June 2022 - https://research.com /scientists-rankings/medicine/at). In total, his work has been cited more than 35,000 times by March 2019 and his h-index is 103 (as of April 2022). Peter Valent is currently ranked #777 among the world's top scientists in Biology and Biochemistry as of April 2022, and #913 among the world's top scientists in Medicine as of June 2022 - https://research.com/scientists- rankings/medicine).

== Awards ==
Valent received several national and international awards, including the Karl Landsteiner-Award of the Austrian Society for Allergy and Immunology, the Paracelsus Award of the Austrian Society for Internal Medicine, the Wilhelm Türk Award of the Austrian Society for Hematology and Oncology, the Theodor-Billroth Medal of the Austrian Medical Association, the Mac Forster Award of the European Society for Clinical Investigation and the Middle European Award for Interdisciplinary Cancer Research.
