= Mikhail Sidorov (ice hockey) =

Russian ice hockey player

- Born: June 25, 1997 (age 28); Yaroslavl, Yaroslavl Oblast, Russia
- Height: 6 ft 1 in (185 cm)
- Weight: 205 lb (93 kg; 14 st 9 lb)
- Position: Defence
- Shoots: Right
- Slovak team Former teams: HC Prešov; Ak Bars Kazan; Lokomotiv Yaroslavl; Kunlun Red Star; Neftekhimik Nizhnekamsk; HC Vityaz
- Playing career: 2015–present

Mikhail Sidorov (born June 25, 1997) is a Russian professional ice hockey defenceman who is currently under contract with HC Prešov in the Slovak Extraliga (Slovak).

== Playing career ==
Sidorov made his debut in the KHL with Ak Bars Kazan in the 2015–16 season.

After claiming the Gagarin Cup with Kazan in the 2017–18 season, Sidorov went down to Supreme Hockey League in the affiliated club Bars Kazan. Then he played with Lokomotiv Yaroslavl, Buran Voronezh and HC Kunlun Red Star.

== Awards and honors ==
Award	Year
KHL
Gagarin Cup (Ak Bars Kazan)	2018
