= Sebastian Ohlsson (ice hockey) =

Swedish ice hockey player

- Born: 4 March 1997 (age 28); Åsele, Sweden
- Height: 175 cm (5 ft 9 in)
- Weight: 82 kg (181 lb; 12 st 13 lb)
- Position: Forward
- Shoots: Left
- Allsv team Former teams: MoDo Hockey; Skellefteå AIK; Timrå IK
- Playing career: 2014–present

Sebastian Ohlsson (born 4 March 1997) is a Swedish professional ice hockey player. He is currently playing with MoDo Hockey of the HockeyAllsvenskan (Allsv).

Ohlsson made his Swedish Hockey League debut playing with Skellefteå AIK during the 2014–15 SHL season. He has also featured with Timrå IK in the SHL.
