= 2014 KHL Junior Draft =

General information
- Date: May 7–8, 2014

Overview
- League: KHL
- First selection: (Russia) Kirill Kaprizov; Selected by: Metallurg Novokuznetsk

The 2014 KHL Junior Draft was the sixth entry draft held by the Kontinental Hockey League (KHL). It took place on May 7–8, 2014. Ice hockey players from around the world aged between 17 and 21 years of age were selected. Players eligible to take part in the draft were required to not have an active contract with a KHL, MHL or VHL team.

== Selections by round ==
=== Round 1 ===
Rank	Player	Position	Nationality	KHL team	Drafted from	Protected player
1	Kirill Kaprizov	A	Russia	Metallurg Novokuznetsk	Metallurg Novokuznetsk	
2	Roman Ivashov	A	Russia	HK Dinamo Minsk→Avtomobilist Yekaterinburg	Avtomobilist Yekaterinburg	1/5
3	Pavel Podluboshnov	AG	Russia	HK Dinamo Minsk→HC CSKA Moscow	HC CSKA Moscow	1/5
4	Aleksandr Shchemerov	D	Russia	HK Dinamo Minsk→Avtomobilist Yekaterinburg	Avtomobilist Yekaterinburg	2/5
5	Ivan Kashtanov	AG	Russia	HK Dinamo Minsk→HC CSKA Moscow	HC CSKA Moscow	2/5
6	Denis Alexeyev	C	Russia	HK Dinamo Minsk→Lokomotiv Yaroslavl	Lokomotiv Yaroslavl	Protected
7	Alexander Kozyrev	D	Russia	HK Dinamo Minsk	HC CSKA Moscow	
8	Pavel Karnaukhov	C	Belarus	HC CSKA Moscow	HC CSKA Moscow	
9	Nikita Korostelev	AD	Russia	Avtomobilist Yekaterinburg	Sarnia Sting	
10	Yegor Rykov	D	Russia	SKA Saint Petersburg	SKA Saint Petersburg	
11	Nikita Li	A	Russia	HC Spartak Moscow	HC Spartak Moscow	
12	Denis Malgin	C	Switzerland; Russia	HC CSKA Moscow	GCK Lions	
13	Tigran Manukyan	A	Russia	Avangard Omsk	Avangard Omsk	
14	Erik Černák	D	Slovakia	HC Slovan Bratislava	HC Košice	
15	Dmitri Zhukenov	D	Russia	Avangard Omsk	Avangard Omsk	
16	Yakov Trenin	C	Russia	Traktor Chelyabinsk	Traktor Chelyabinsk	
17	Alexander Volkov	A	Russia	SKA Saint Petersburg	SKA Saint Petersburg	
18	Anton Pervov	A	Russia	Atlant Mytichtchi	Severstal Cherepovets	1/5
19	Yegor Babenko	A	Kazakhstan	HC CSKA Moscow	Rubin Tyumen	
20	Boris Levitsky	A	Russia	Lokomotiv Yaroslavl	Traktor Chelyabinsk	
21	Yevgeni Mityakin	A	Russia	Neftekhimik Nizhnekamsk→Avtomobilist Yekaterinburg	Avtomobilist Yekaterinburg	3/5
22	Yegor Sorokin	D	Russia	Neftekhimik Nizhnekamsk	Avtomobilist Yekaterinburg	
23	Artyom Vladimirov	D	Russia	Sibir Novosibirsk	Sibir Novosibirsk	
24	Semyon Krasheninnikov	G	Russia	HC CSKA Moscow	HC CSKA Moscow	
25	Travis Konecny	C	Canada	Dinamo Riga	Ottawa	
26	Jérémy Roy	D	Canada	Dinamo Riga	Sherbrooke Phoenix	
27	Ivan Volodin	A	Russia	SKA Saint Petersburg	Ermak Angarsk	
28	Mikhaïl Vorobyov	C	Russia	Salavat Yulaev Ufa	Salavat Yulaev Ufa	
29	Yegor Volkov	D	Russia	Barys Astana→Traktor Chelyabinsk	Traktor Chelyabinsk	1/5
30	Pavel Nechistovsky	G	Russia	Barys Astana→Traktor Chelyabinsk	Traktor Chelyabinsk	2/5
31	Maxim Shipin	A	Russia	Barys Astana→Traktor Chelyabinsk	Traktor Chelyabinsk	3/5
32	Yuri Mogilnikov	AG	Russia	Barys Astana→Traktor Chelyabinsk	Traktor Chelyabinsk	4/5
33	Alexander Gaponov	D	Russia	Barys Astana	Traktor Chelyabinsk	
34	Ilya Samsonov	G	Russia	Metallurg Magnitogorsk	Metallurg Magnitogorsk	
35	Vladimir Barabanov	A	Russia	SKA Saint Petersburg	SKA Saint Petersburg	
36	Denis Tsukanov	A	Russia	Ak Bars Kazan	Junior-Sputnik Nizhny Tagil	
37	Andrei Nesterov	D	Russia	SKA Saint Petersburg	SKA Saint Petersburg	
38	Artyom Ikamatskikh	D	Russia	Metallurg Magnitogorsk	Metallurg Magnitogorsk	
39	Ivan Bezrukov	AD	Russia	Traktor Chelyabinsk	Traktor Chelyabinsk	
40	Denis Smirnov	AG	Russia	HC Sochi	Indiana Ice	
41	Aleksi Saarela	C	Finland	Jokerit	Lukko	
42	Denis Guryanov	A	Russia	Avtomobilist Yekaterinburg→Lada Togliatti	Lada Togliatti	1/5
43	Vladislav Shishkov	D	Russia	Avtomobilist Yekaterinburg	Avtomobilist Yekaterinburg	

=== Round 2 ===
Rank	Player	Position	Nationality	KHL team	Drafted from	Protected player
44	Mikhail Byakin	C	Russia	Avtomobilist Yekaterinburg→HC CSKA Moscow	HC CSKA Moscow	3/5
45	Alexander Petunin	A	Russia	Avtomobilist Yekaterinburg→HC Dynamo Moscow	HC Dynamo Moscow	1/5
46	Maxim Askarov	A	Russia	Avtomobilist Yekaterinburg	Chelmet Chelyabinsk	
47	Arttu Ruotsalainen	A	Finland	Metallurg Novokuznetsk	Karpat Oulu	
48	Sergei Zborovsky	D	Russia	HK Dinamo Minsk→HC Dynamo Moscow	HC Dynamo Moscow	2/5
49	Artyom Volkov	D	Russia	HK Dinamo Minsk→HC Dynamo Moscow	HC Dynamo Moscow	3/5
50	Nikolai Chebykin	A	Russia	HK Dinamo Minsk→HC Dynamo Moscow	HC Dynamo Moscow	4/5
51	Yevgeni Kiselyov	G	Russia	HK Dinamo Minsk→HC Dynamo Moscow	HC Dynamo Moscow	5/5
52	Marsel Ibragimov	D	Russia	HK Dinamo Minsk	HC Dynamo Moscow	
53	Yevgeni Shuleshov	D	Russia	Neftekhimik Nizhnekamsk	Sokol Krasnoyarsk	
54	Alexander Samoliov	G	Russia	HC CSKA Moscow	HC CSKA Moscow	
55	Kirill Kalinin	G	Russia	HC Spartak Moscow	HC Spartak Moscow	
56	Dmitri Yushkevich	D	Russia	Yugra Khanty-Mansiysk→Lokomotiv Yaroslavl	Lokomotiv Yaroslavl	Protected
57	Vladislav Dyukarev	A	Russia	Yugra Khanty-Mansiysk→Metallurg Magnitogorsk	Metallurg Magnitogorsk	1/5
58	Anton Grishanov	D	Belarus	Yugra Khanty-Mansiysk	Avangard Omsk	
59	Radovan Bondra	AD	Slovakia	HC Slovan Bratislava	HC Kosice	
60	Maxim Mineyev	D	Russia	Avangard Omsk	Avangard Omsk	
61	Timur Fatkullin	D	Russia	Traktor Chelyabinsk	Traktor Chelyabinsk	
62	Sebastian Aho	A	Finland	Severstal Cherepovets	Karpat Oulu	
63	Sergei Golov	D	Russia	Atlant Mytichtchi	HC Dynamo Moscow	
64	Yegor Voronkov	D	Russia	Admiral Vladivostok→HC Vityaz	HC Vityaz	1/5
65	Alexander Zhebelev	A	Russia	Admiral Vladivostok	HC Dynamo Moscow	
66	Denis Yan	AG	United States	Lokomotiv Yaroslavl	USNTDP	
67	Valeri Bochkaryov	A	Russia	HC Vityaz	HC Vityaz	
68	Grigori Ankudinov	D	Russia	Sibir Novosibirsk	Traktor Chelyabinsk	
69	Andrei Bannikov	A	Russia	Avtomobilist Yekaterinburg	Gornyak Uchaly	
70	Anton Krasotkin	G	Russia	KHL Medveščak→Lokomotiv Yaroslavl	Lokomotiv Yaroslavl	Protected
71	Mikhaol Sidorov	D	Russia	KHL Medveščak→Lokomotiv Yaroslavl	Lokomotiv Yaroslavl	Protected
72	Dmitri Belavsky	A	Russia	KHL Medveščak→Lokomotiv Yaroslavl	Lokomotiv Yaroslavl	Protected
73	Alexei Platonov	D	Russia	KHL Medveščak→Atlant Mytichtchi	Atlant Mytichtchi	1/5
74	Kamil Fazylzyanov	D	Russia	KHL Medveščak→Neftekhimik Nizhnekamsk	Neftekhimik Nizhnekamsk	1/5
75	Mikhail Yesayan	C	Russia	KHL Medveščak→Lokomotiv Yaroslavl	Lokomotiv Yaroslavl	Protected
76	Artyom Rozhkovsky	AG	Russia	KHL Medveščak→Avangard Omsk	Avangard Omsk	2/5
77	Connor McDavid	C	Canada	KHL Medveščak	Erie Otters	
78	Andrej Hatala	D	Slovakia	Dinamo Riga	Dukla Trenčín	
79	Mikhail Potapov	A	Russia	Torpedo Nizhny Novgorod	Torpedo Nizhny Novgorod	
80	Gleb Kuzmin	A	Russia	Salavat Yulaev Ufa	HC Dynamo Moscow	
81	Nikita Medvedev	D	Kazakhstan	Barys Astana	Kazzinc-Torpedo Ust-Kamenogorsk	
82	Pavel Zacha	AG	Czech Republic	Donbass Donetsk	HC Bílí Tygři Liberec	
83	Filip Chlapik	C	Czech Republic	HC Lev Praha	HC Sparta Praha	
84	Savva Gavrilov	D	Russia	Ak Bars Kazan→HC Spartak Moscow	HC Spartak Moscow	1/5
85	Anton Butakov	D	Russia	Ak Bars Kazan→Metallurg Novokuznetsk	Metallurg Novokuznetsk	2/5
86	Daniil Dyldin	A	Russia	Ak Bars Kazan→HC Spartak Moscow	HC Spartak Moscow	2/5
87	Ivan Yemets	AD	Russia	Ak Bars Kazan→Metallurg Novokuznetsk	Metallurg Novokuznetsk	3/5
88	Artyom Valeyev	A	Russia	Ak Bars Kazan	Ak Bars Kazan	
89	Konstantin Volkov	G	Russia	SKA Saint Petersburg	SKA Saint Petersburg	
90	Danil Mukhamedzyanov	A	Russia	Metallurg Magnitogorsk	Metallurg Magnitogorsk	
91	Givi Chitava	A	Russia	HC Dynamo Moscow	Oakland Jr. Grizzlies (T1EHL)	
92	Daniil Miromanov	A	Russia	HC Sochi	Toronto Jr. Canadiens (GTHL)	
93	Julius Nättinen	A	Finland	Jokerit	JYP Jyväskylä	
94	Alexei Ryabokonov	D	Russia	Lada Togliatti	Lada Togliatti	

=== Round 3 ===
Rank	Player	Position	Nationality	KHL team	Drafted from	Protected player
95	Roman Krikunenko	A	Russia	Amur Khabarovsk→Lokomotiv Yaroslavl	Lokomotiv Yaroslavl	Protected
96	Alexander Polunin	A	Russia	Amur Khabarovsk→Lokomotiv Yaroslavl	Lokomotiv Yaroslavl	Protected
97	Andrei Lugovoy	AD	Russia	Amur Khabarovsk→HC Spartak Moscow	HC Spartak Moscow	3/5
98	Anton Kovalyov	A	Russia	Amur Khabarovsk→Avangard Omsk	Avangard Omsk	3/5
99	Nikita Kaptelin	A	Russia	Amur Khabarovsk	HC Dmitrov	
100	Ville Jarvinen	D	Finland	Metallurg Magnitogorsk	Ilves	
101	No pick made			HK Dinamo Minsk		
102	Alexei Bespalov	A	Russia	Neftekhimik Nizhnekamsk	Traktor Chelyabinsk	
103	Petr Prochazka	D	Czech Republic	Neftekhimik Nizhnekamsk	HC Zlín	
104	Sergei Morozov	D	Russia	HC Spartak Moscow	HC Spartak Moscow	
105	Vladimir Kalugin	D	Russia	Severstal Cherepovets	HC CSKA Moscow	
106	Peter Valent	C/AG	Slovakia	HC Slovan Bratislava	HC ’05 Banská Bystrica	
107	Oliver Kylington	D	Sweden	Avangard Omsk	Färjestad BK	
108	Danil Yurtaikin	A	Russia	Traktor Chelyabinsk→Lokomotiv Yaroslavl	Lokomotiv Yaroslavl	Protected
109	Platon Prokhorov	D	Russia	Traktor Chelyabinsk→Lokomotiv Yaroslavl	Lokomotiv Yaroslavl	Protected
110	Yuri Shadrin	A	Russia	Traktor Chelyabinsk	Traktor Chelyabinsk	
111	Igor Myasishchev	D	Russia	Severstal Cherepovets→HC CSKA Moscow	HC CSKA Moscow	4/5
112	Maxim Leonov	D	Russia	Severstal Cherepovets	HC Dynamo Moscow	
113	Vladimir Bobylyov	A	Russia	Atlant Mytichtchi	Atlant Mytichtchi	
114	Nikita Loshchenko	A	Russia	Severstal Cherepovets	Sokol Krasnoyarsk	
115	Jakub Zboril	D	Czech Republic	Lokomotiv Yaroslavl	HC Kometa Brno	
116	Alexander Gomolyako	D	Russia	HC CSKA Moscow	HC CSKA Moscow	
117	Artyom Bakushin	D	Russia	Sibir Novosibirsk	Rubin Tyumen	
118	Dmitri Buinitsky	A	Belarus	Avtomobilist Yekaterinburg→HK Dinamo Minsk	HK Dinamo Minsk	1/5
119	Danila Kvartalnov	AG	Russia	Avtomobilist Yekaterinburg→Sibir Novosibirsk	Sibir Novosibirsk	1/5
120	Ivan Provorov	D	Russia	Avtomobilist Yekaterinburg→Lokomotiv Yaroslavl	Cedar Rapids RoughRiders	Protected
121	Nikita Tsirkul	G	Russia	Avtomobilist Yekaterinburg	Avtomobilist Yekaterinburg	
122	Roman Skhodtsev	D	Russia	KHL Medveščak	Rus Moscow	
123	Roman Dymacek	A	Czech Republic	Dinamo Riga	HC Kometa Brno	
124	Alexander Shurygin	D	Russia	Salavat Yulaev Ufa→Metallurg Magnitogorsk	Metallurg Magnitogorsk	2/5
125	Mikhail Syroyezhkin	D	Russia	Salavat Yulaev Ufa→HC Spartak Moscow	HC Spartak Moscow	4/5
126	Pyotr Kuznetsov	D	Russia	Salavat Yulaev Ufa	Okanagan Hockey Academy (CSSHL)	
127	Vladislav Lukin	A	Russia	Salavat Yulaev Ufa	Salavat Yulaev Ufa	
128	Jarkko Parikka	D	Finland	Sibir Novosibirsk	Des Moines Buccaneers	
129	David Kase	A	Czech Republic	Avtomobilist Yekaterinburg	KLH Chomutov	
130	Semyon Mzhelsky	D	Russia	HC Dynamo Moscow	HC Dynamo Moscow	
131	Artur Tyanulin	A	Russia	Ak Bars Kazan	Ak Bars Kazan	
132	Timur Sulteyev	D	Russia	SKA Saint Petersburg	SKA Saint Petersburg	
133	Gustav Bouramman	D	Sweden	Metallurg Novokuznetsk	Luleå HF	
134	Ales Stezka	G	Czech Republic	HC Lev Praha	HC Bílí Tygři Liberec	
135	Leonid Lazarev	G	Russia	HC Sochi	Waterloo Siskins (GOJHL)	
136	Jens Lööke	AG	Sweden	Jokerit	Brynäs IF )	
137	Ilya Zhukov	C	Russia	Lada Togliatti	Lada Togliatti	

=== Round 4 ===
Rank	Player	Position	Nationality	KHL team	Drafted from	Protected player
138	Alexei Nikonorov	A	Russia	HC Dynamo Moscow	Kristall Elektrostal	
139	Ivan Vorobyov	A	Russia	Neftekhimik Nizhnekamsk	HC Dynamo Moscow	
140	Michael Spacek	A	Czech Republic	HK Dinamo Minsk	HC Pardubice	
141	Igor Ugolnikov	A	Russia	Neftekhimik Nizhnekamsk	Neftekhimik Nizhnekamsk	
142	Pavel Skumatov	A	Russia	HC Vityaz	HC Vityaz	
143	Luka Zorko	D	Slovenia	HC Spartak Moscow	Atlant Mytichtchi	
144	Artur Gizdatullin	A	Russia	Torpedo Nizhny Novgorod	Ak Bars Kazan	
145	Martin Andrisik	A	Slovakia	HC Slovan Bratislava	HC ’05 Banská Bystrica	
146	Filip Suchy	A	Czech Republic	HC CSKA Moscow	HC Škoda Plzeň	
147	Alexei Novichkov	A	Russia	Traktor Chelyabinsk	Traktor Chelyabinsk	
148	Filip Dvorak	A	Czech Republic	Avangard Omsk	HC Kometa Brno	
149	Martin Svoboda	A	Czech Republic	Atlant Mytichtchi	HC Sparta Praha	
150	Damir Khusainov	A	Russia	Admiral Vladivostok	Rus Moscow	
151	Roger Karrer	D	Switzerland	Lokomotiv Yaroslavl	GCK Lions	
152	Anton Ruban	A	Russia	Avtomobilist Yekaterinburg→Avangard Omsk	Avangard Omsk	4/5
153	Igor Goleshchikhin	A	Russia	Avtomobilist Yekaterinburg	Avangard Omsk	
154	Kirill Urakov	A	Russia	Torpedo Nizhny Novgorod	Izhstal Izhevsk	
155	Artyom Sadretdinov	A	Russia	HC CSKA Moscow	HC CSKA Moscow	
156	Jesse Gabrielle	AG	Canada	KHL Medveščak	Brandon Wheat Kings	
157	Kristians Rubins	D	Latvia	Dinamo Riga	Västerås IK	
158	Nikita Milyokhin	A	Russia	Severstal Cherepovets	HC Dynamo Moscow	
159	Ivan Bitkin	D	Russia	Salavat Yulaev Ufa	Rus Moscow	
160	Denis Yermoshenko	D	Russia	Salavat Yulaev Ufa	HC Spartak Moscow	
161	Alexander Yenyushin	G	Russia	Neftekhimik Nizhnekamsk	Neftekhimik Nizhnekamsk	
162	Lukas Jasek	A	Czech Republic	HC Lev Praha	Södertälje SK	
163	Roman Sattarov	A	Russia	Ak Bars Kazan	Ak Bars Kazan	
164	Pavel Pravilo	A	Russia	Atlant Mytichtchi	Atlant Mytichtchi	
165	Anton Chmykhov	D	Russia	Metallurg Magnitogorsk→HC CSKA Moscow	HC CSKA Moscow	5/5
166	Sergei Chuchkov	A	Russia	Metallurg Magnitogorsk	Metallurg Magnitogorsk	
167	Rihards Puide	A	Latvia	HC Lev Praha	ZSC Lions	
168	Daniel Vladar	G	Czech Republic	HC Sochi	HC Kladno	
169	Veeti Vainio	D	Finland	Jokerit	Espoo Blues	
170	Daniil Sorokin	D	Russia	Lada Togliatti	Lada Togliatti	

=== Round 5 ===
Rank	Player	Position	Nationality	KHL team	Drafted from	Protected player
171	Andreï Ilyin	A	Russia	Amur Khabarovsk	HC CSKA Moscow	
172	Matej Tomek	G	Slovakia	Lokomotiv Yaroslavl	HK Orange 20	
173	Filip Ahl	AG	Sweden	HK Dinamo Minsk	HV71	
174	Andrei Obidin	A	Russia	Neftekhimik Nizhnekamsk→Avtomobilist Yekaterinburg	Avtomobilist Yekaterinburg	4/5
175	Maksim Kashin	A	Russia	Neftekhimik Nizhnekamsk	Altai Barnaul	
176	Dmitri Noskov	A	Russia	SKA Saint Petersburg→Salavat Yulaev Ufa	Salavat Yulaev Ufa	
177	Stanislav Shepitko	A	Russia	SKA Saint Petersburg	SKA Saint Petersburg	
178	Vladislav Prikhodko	A	Russia	Metallurg Magnitogorsk	Metallurg Magnitogorsk	
179	Dmitri Drozhzhin	A	Russia	Neftekhimik Nizhnekamsk	HC Dmitrov	
180	Denis Patoprsty	AD	Slovakia	HC Slovan Bratislava	BK Mladá Boleslav	
181	Vladislav Buyanov	A/D	Russia	Severstal Cherepovets	Zelenograd Moscow	
182	Callum Booth	G	Canada	Traktor Chelyabinsk	Quebec Remparts	
183	Denis Ludtsev	A	Russia	Severstal Cherepovets	Altai Barnaul	
184	Savva Andreyev	A	Russia	Atlant Mytichtchi	HC CSKA Moscow	
185	Simon Stransky	A	Czech Republic	HC Lev Praha	HC Vítkovice	
186	Denis Kozhukhovsky	G	Russia	Metallurg Novokuznetsk→Salavat Yulaev Ufa	Salavat Yulaev Ufa	
187	Vitali Utkin	D	Russia	Metallurg Novokuznetsk	Altai Barnaul	
188	Vladislav Otpushchennikov	G	Russia	Lada Togliatti	Lada Togliatti	
189	Nikita Dynyak	A	Russia	SKA Saint Petersburg	SKA Saint Petersburg	
190	Semyon Luogvyak	D	Russia	HC CSKA Moscow	HC CSKA Moscow	
191	Felix Sandström	G	Sweden	KHL Medveščak	Brynäs IF	
192	Gvido Jansons	D	Latvia	Dinamo Riga	Selects Hockey Academy (USPHL)	
193	Mikhail Smolin	A	Russia	Torpedo Nizhny Novgorod	Torpedo Nizhny Novgorod	
194	Arseni Yeltyshev	A	Russia	Salavat Yulaev Ufa→Avtomobilist Yekaterinburg	Avtomobilist Yekaterinburg	5/5
195	Fyodor Vedernikov	A	Russia	Salavat Yulaev Ufa→SKA Saint Petersburg	SKA Saint Petersburg	1/5
196	Alexei Krasilnikov	A	Russia	Salavat Yulaev Ufa	Salavat Yulaev Ufa	
197	Yegor Popov	A	Russia	Salavat Yulaev Ufa	Notre Dame Hounds (SMHL)	
198	Alexei Vlaskin	D	Russia	Avtomobilist Yekaterinburg	Tsentr Moscow	
199	Daniel Krenzelok	D	Czech Republic	HC Lev Praha	HC Vítkovice	
200	No pick made			Ak Bars Kazan		
201	Arseny Lysenko	D/AG	Sweden	SKA Saint Petersburg	Fribourg-Gottéron	
202	Dylan Strome	C	Canada	Metallurg Magnitogorsk	Erie Otters	
203	Yuri Shustrov	C	Russia	HC Dynamo Moscow→HC Spartak Moscow	HC Spartak Moscow	5/5
204	Gleb Zarechny	A	Russia	HC Dynamo Moscow	HK Dynamo Moscow	
205	Ruslan Petrishchev	D	Russia	HC Sochi→Yugra Khanty-Mansiysk	Yugra Khanty-Mansiysk	1/5
206	Adam Húska	G	Slovakia	HC Sochi	HK Orange 20	
207	Vili Saarijärvi	A	Finland	Jokerit	Kärpät Oulu	
208	Anton Koshelev	A	Russia	Lada Togliatti	Metallurg Magnitogorsk	

== See also ==
- 2014–15 KHL season
- 2014 NHL entry draft
- KHL territorial pick
