= Nicolas Aubé-Kubel =

Canadian ice hockey player (born 1996)

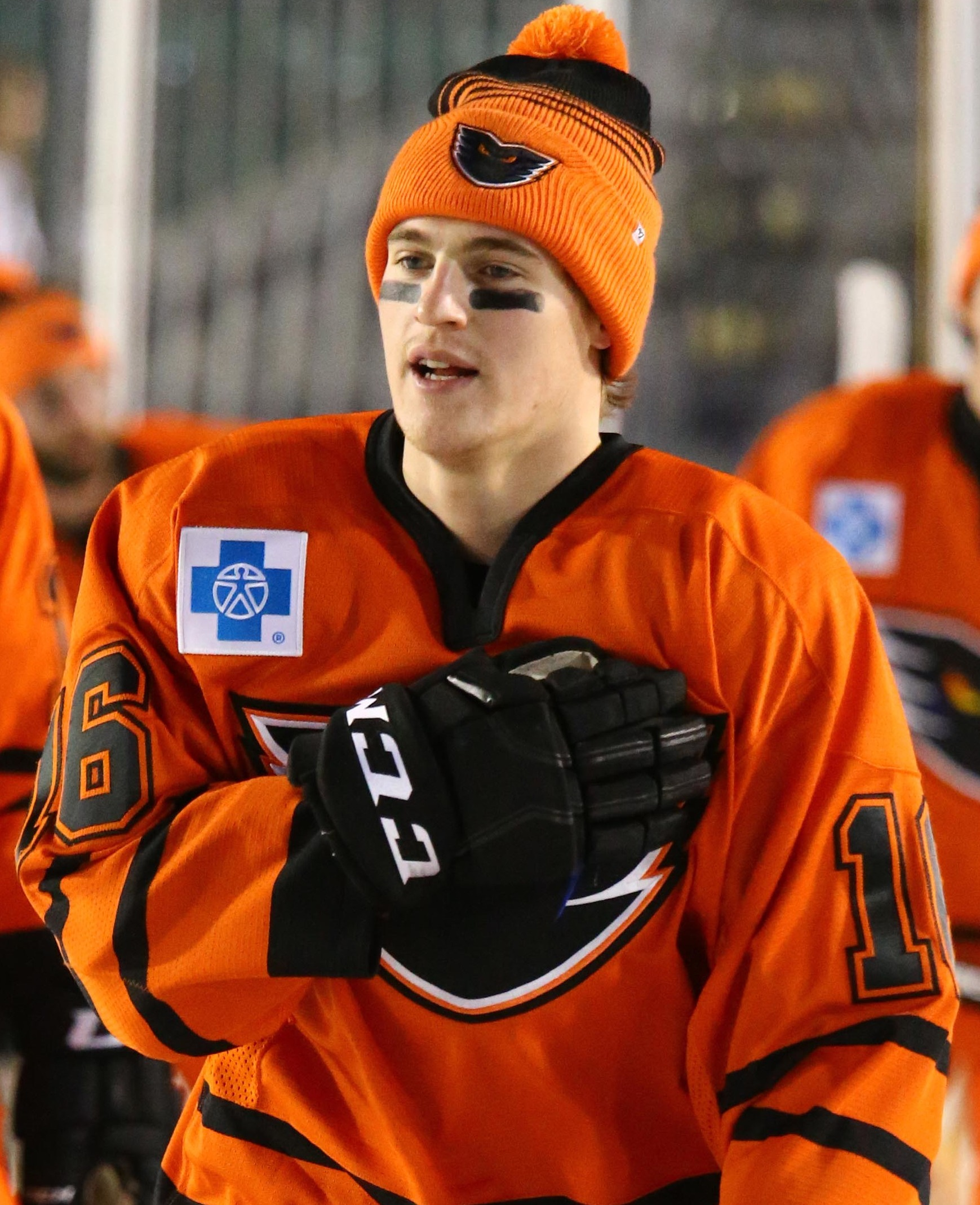
- Aubé-Kubel with the Lehigh Valley Phantoms in 2018
- Born: May 10, 1996 (age 30) Slave Lake, Alberta, Canada
- Height: 6 ft 0 in (183 cm)
- Weight: 213 lb (97 kg; 15 st 3 lb)
- Position: Right wing
- Shoots: Right
- KHL team Former teams: Dinamo Minsk; Philadelphia Flyers; Colorado Avalanche; Toronto Maple Leafs; Washington Capitals; Buffalo Sabres; New York Rangers; Minnesota Wild
- NHL draft: 48th overall, 2014; Philadelphia Flyers
- Playing career: 2016–present

Nicolas Aubé-Kubel (/oʊˈbeɪkuːˈbɛl/ oh-BAY-koo-BEHL; born May 10, 1996) is a Canadian professional ice hockey player. He is a right winger who is currently playing under contract to HC Dinamo Minsk of the Kontinental Hockey League (KHL). He previously played in the National Hockey League (NHL) for the Philadelphia Flyers, Colorado Avalanche, Toronto Maple Leafs, Washington Capitals, Buffalo Sabres, New York Rangers and Minnesota Wild. The Flyers selected him in the second round, 48th overall, of the 2014 NHL entry draft.

Aubé-Kubel was born in Slave Lake, Alberta, but moved to Sorel-Tracy, Quebec, with his family at the age of two. He played minor ice hockey and speed skating with local teams. Aubé-Kubel's performance at the midget hockey level led to his being drafted seventh overall by the Val-d'Or Foreurs of the Quebec Major Junior Hockey League (QMJHL) in their 2012 draft. After his first two seasons with the Foreurs, during which he was drafted by the Flyers, Aubé-Kubel had a break-out season in 2014–15, scoring 80 points and taking the team to the playoffs. He continued his strong point production into the following season, serving as alternate captain for the Foreurs.

When the Foreurs' 2015–16 season came to a close, Aubé-Kubel was invited to join the Lehigh Valley Phantoms, the Flyers' American Hockey League (AHL) affiliate, for their final six games of the season. His first full season of AHL hockey was offensively disappointing, as Aubé-Kubel was still learning the league, but the following year, he improved both on point-scoring and physicality. Aubé-Kubel made his NHL debut in 2018, but was sent back down to the Phantoms after only nine games. He did not become a staple in the Flyers' line-up until December 2019. As a fourth-line winger, Aubé-Kubel had a productive 2019–20 season, but fell victim to a sophomore slump in 2021, with a particularly high number of penalty minutes.

The Flyers placed him on waivers early in the 2021–22 season, and the Colorado Avalanche claimed him. Aubé-Kubel won the Stanley Cup with the Avalanche in 2022.

== Early life ==
Nicolas Aubé-Kubel was born in Slave Lake, Alberta, on May 10, 1996, but moved to Sorel-Tracy, Quebec, with his mother Annie at the age of two. Aubé-Kubel and his sister Alex-Anne began skating shortly after the move. Alex-Anne became a strong figure skater, participating in national and international competitions, while Aubé-Kubel practiced ice hockey and speed skating. He was cut from both his Pee-Wee and Midget minor ice hockey teams, but developed a strong offensive repertoire on the ice.

In 2011, the École secondaire Fernand-Lefebvre in Sorel-Tracy attempted to recruit Aubé-Kubel for their burgeoning junior ice hockey program, but he elected to play for the Collège Antoine-Girouard Gaulois of the Quebec AAA Midget Hockey League. The Gaulois posted the best record in the league during the 2011–12 season, bolstered by 11 goals and 13 assists from Aubé-Kubel, for a total of 24 regular-season points. In 11 playoff games, he scored an additional seven goals and nine assists.

== Playing career ==
=== Amateur ===
The Val-d'Or Foreurs of the Quebec Major Junior Hockey League (QMJHL) selected Aubé-Kubel in the first round, seventh overall, of the 2012 QMJHL draft. As a 16-year-old rookie during the 2012–13 season, Aubé-Kubel scored 27 points in 64 games, made up of 10 goals and 17 assists. His point production nearly doubled the following year, with 22 goals and 31 assists in 65 games during the 2013–14 season. Aubé-Kubel, who played on the second offensive line, spent the season honing his defensive skills and increasing his physical strength. The Foreurs won both the President's Cup and the QJMHL Championship title that season, but fell short of capturing the Memorial Cup.

After the 2013–14 season, Philadelphia Flyers of the National Hockey League (NHL) selected Aubé-Kubel in the second round, 48th overall, of the 2014 NHL entry draft. He signed an entry-level contract with the team on October 2, 2014, after appearing in a preseason game with the Flyers.

Aubé-Kubel returned to the Foreurs for the 2014–15 season. After losing top scorers Anthony Mantha, Louick Marcotte, and Guillaume Gélinas during the offseason, the team asked Aubé-Kubel to play on the top line and focus on his offensive abilities. After a strong start to the season, scoring 14 points in the first 13 games of the year, he was sidelined with a knee injury from a November collision. When Aubé-Kubel returned to the team later in the month, he struggled to regain his momentum. Once he did, he proceeded to score 28 goals and 80 total points for the regular season, with half of his goals coming between December 6 and March 21, the end of the regular season. He helped take the Foreurs into the QMJHL playoffs, putting up 10 points in the first few rounds and advancing over the Baie-Comeau Drakkar. The team ultimately fell in the semifinals to the Rimouski Océanic.

The 2015–16 season was a break-out year for Aubé-Kubel, who served as an assistant captain on the Foreurs for the second year in a row. His strong eye–hand coordination and quick skating led to consistent point production during his time on the ice. Between November 10 and December 30, Aubé-Kubel had a 15-game point streak, with an average just over two points per game. He finished the QMJHL season with 38 goals and 46 assists, for a total of 84 points in 61 games. Despite his strong scoring, the Foreurs failed to advance past the first round of QMJHL playoffs that year, falling to the Blainville-Boisbriand Armada in a best-of-seven series.

=== Professional ===
==== Prospect ====
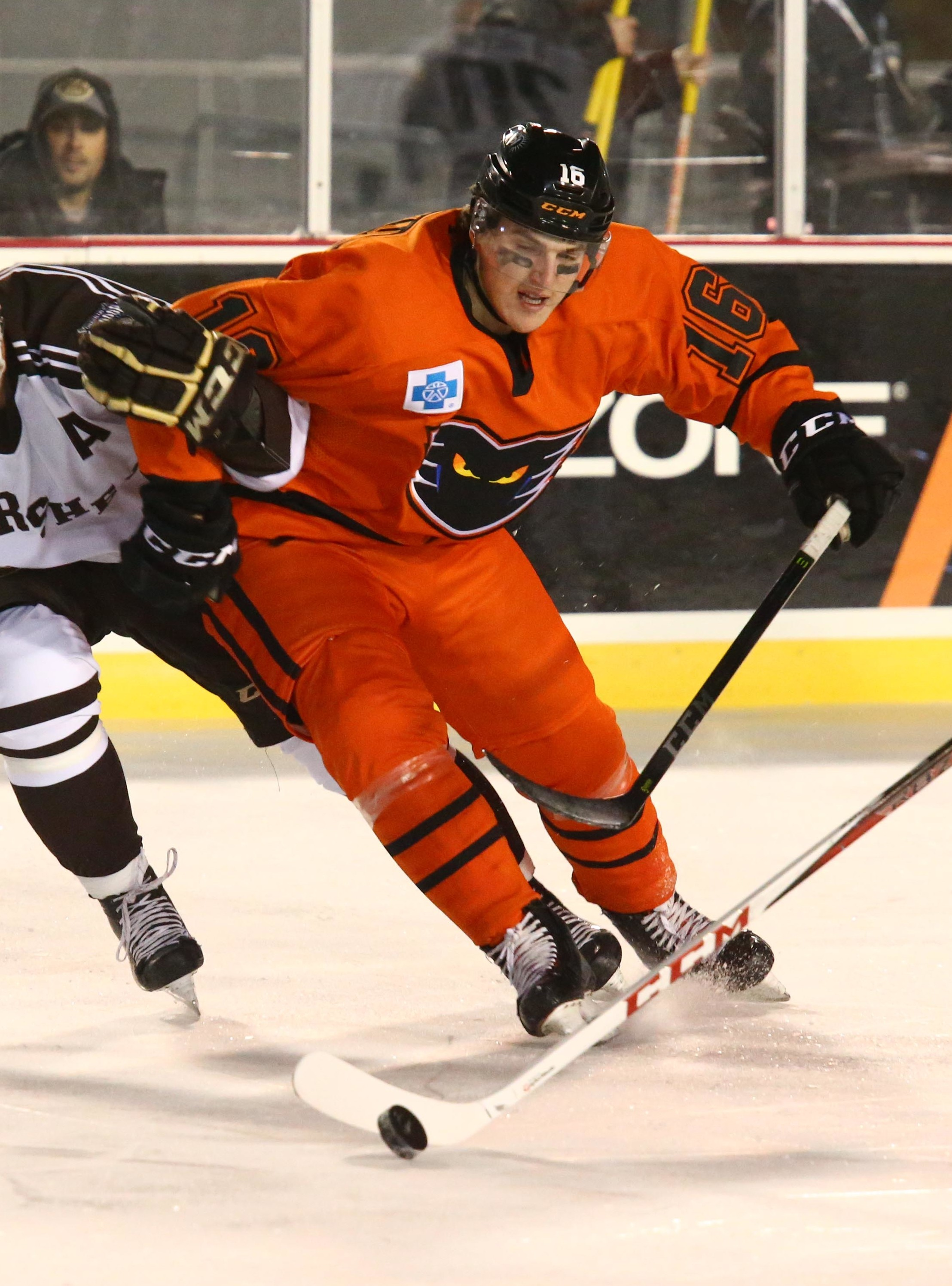
Aubé-Kubel with the Lehigh Valley Phantoms in 2018

On April 6, 2016, after the conclusion of their respective junior hockey seasons, Aubé-Kubel, Travis Sanheim, and Radel Fazleev were assigned to the Lehigh Valley Phantoms, the Flyers' American Hockey League (AHL) affiliate, for the final six games of the season. In those six games, he scored two goals and one assist.

The 2016–17 season was Aubé-Kubel's first full year of professional ice hockey, playing once again for the Phantoms. His performance was more modest than it had been during his junior hockey career, with only nine goals and 18 points in 71 AHL games. Flyers general manager Ron Hextall told reporters that Aubé-Kubel's deficits were because he "didn't understand the American League ... It's a much higher level than junior hockey." Aubé-Kubel himself said that his main priority as a rookie was to better understand the role that he played in a professional hockey team, and that, after finding that role, he would focus on offensive performance in the following season.

Aubé-Kubel returned to the Phantoms for the 2017–18 AHL season, with a considerable improvement to his scoring. He finished the season with the eighth-highest point even-strength point totals in the AHL (43), 36 of which were goals or primary assists. As his offensive ability was improving, however, Aubé-Kubel struggled with the physical element of the game, receiving three AHL suspensions for illegal head checks to his opponents, and his 86 penalty minutes were the highest of any year in his career thus far. During the 2018 Calder Cup playoffs, Aubé-Kubel received a three-game suspension for an illegal head check during a division final game against the Charlotte Checkers. The Phantoms went on to beat the Checkers in the division finals, but fell to the Toronto Marlies in the Eastern Conference finals.

==== Philadelphia Flyers ====
Although Aubé-Kubel attended the Flyers' training camp and played in a series of preseason matches, he and Philippe Myers were assigned to the AHL to begin the 2018–19 season. Aubé-Kubel had paired well on a line with Claude Giroux and Jordan Weal during a preseason match against the Boston Bruins, but, at the start of the season, there was a limited role for his skill set in the roster. After playing eight games with the Phantoms, scoring three goals and four assists, Aubé-Kubel received his first NHL call-up on October 28, 2018. He made his NHL debut two days later, skating on the fourth line with Scott Laughton and Jori Lehterä in a match against the Anaheim Ducks. His time during his first NHL stint was limited, appearing in only nine games and never logging more than eight minutes of ice time per game. He returned to the Phantoms for the remainder of the season, missing several games with a knee injury followed by a concussion. In 54 AHL games that year, Aubé-Kubel scored 16 goals and 30 points.

On July 16, 2019, the Flyers signed Aubé-Kubel to a one-year, two-way contract extension worth $700,000. Going into the 2019–20 NHL season, the Flyers experienced a change of management, with Alain Vigneault replacing Dave Hakstol as head coach. Despite impressing Vigneault in training camp, Aubé-Kubel was placed on waivers at the start of the season, to allow his assignment to the Phantoms. He played in 26 games for the Phantoms, scoring five goals and 38 assists, before receiving another recall to the Flyers on December 15. Aubé-Kubel scored his first NHL goal on December 23, in the third period of a 5–1 victory over the New York Rangers. He remained with the team for the remainder of the regular season, which was suspended on March 12, 2020, due to the COVID-19 pandemic. When the season came to an end, he had settled into a role on the fourth offensive line, alongside Michael Raffl and Nate Thompson. Aubé-Kubel played in 36 games with the Flyers before the season ended prematurely, scoring seven goals and eight assists while playing on the bottom two lines.

When the NHL returned to play for the 2020 Stanley Cup playoffs in Toronto, Aubé-Kubel was one of 31 Flyers selected to play in the "bubble". He scored two goals in the Flyers' 4–1 defeat of the Tampa Bay Lightning during the round-robin portion of the tournament, helping the team to clinch the top seed in the Eastern Conference. He played a total of 13 playoff games with the Flyers, scoring one assist in addition to those two goals, but missed three games with a bone bruise on his knee after blocking a shot. The Flyers ultimately fell to the New York Islanders in the second round of playoffs.

On September 17, 2020, the Flyers signed Aubé-Kubel to a two-year, $2.15 million contract extension. He began the pandemic-delayed 2020–21 NHL season playing on a defensively-minded fourth line that also consisted of Laughton and Raffl. On January 19, 2021, Aubé-Kubel was fined $4,633.32, the maximum allowable under the NHL Collective Bargaining Agreement, for what Buffalo Sabres coach Ralph Krueger called a "deliberate hit to the head" of skater Rasmus Dahlin. Aubé-Kubel's season performance was a regression from the year prior, with far fewer points being scored and far more penalties taken. By April 15, Aubé-Kubel ranked eighth among all NHL skaters in penalty minutes, and he was the only player in the top 15 to register 500 or fewer minutes on the ice. In the final game of the season, while playing against the Washington Capitals, Aubé-Kubel collided with both T. J. Oshie and Tom Wilson, injuring both. While Wilson ultimately returned to the game, Oshie did not. He finished the season with three goals and 12 points, as well as 44 penalty minutes, in 50 games.

==== Colorado Avalanche ====
After struggling through the first part of the Flyers' 2021–22 season, with only one assist through seven games, the team placed Aubé-Kubel on waivers on November 12, where he was claimed by the Colorado Avalanche. Aubé-Kubel made his debut with the Avalanche placed on the third-line alongside Tyson Jost and Alex Newhook, in a 4–2 victory over the Vancouver Canucks on November 17, 2021. In the following game, Aubé-Kubel registered his first goal and point with the Avalanche, scoring in a 7–3 victory over the Seattle Kraken on November 19, 2021. As the season progressed, the Avalanche drew praise from sportswriters for their scoring depth, with offensive production from all forward lines, including a fourth line made up of Aubé-Kubel, Tyson Jost, and Darren Helm. He also received scrutiny from head coach Jared Bednar for taking penalties, with Bednar telling reporters, "It's just discipline. That's what it is" after a 5–1 loss against the Boston Bruins in February. Aubé-Kubel finished the regular season with a career-high 11 goals and 23 points in 73 games.

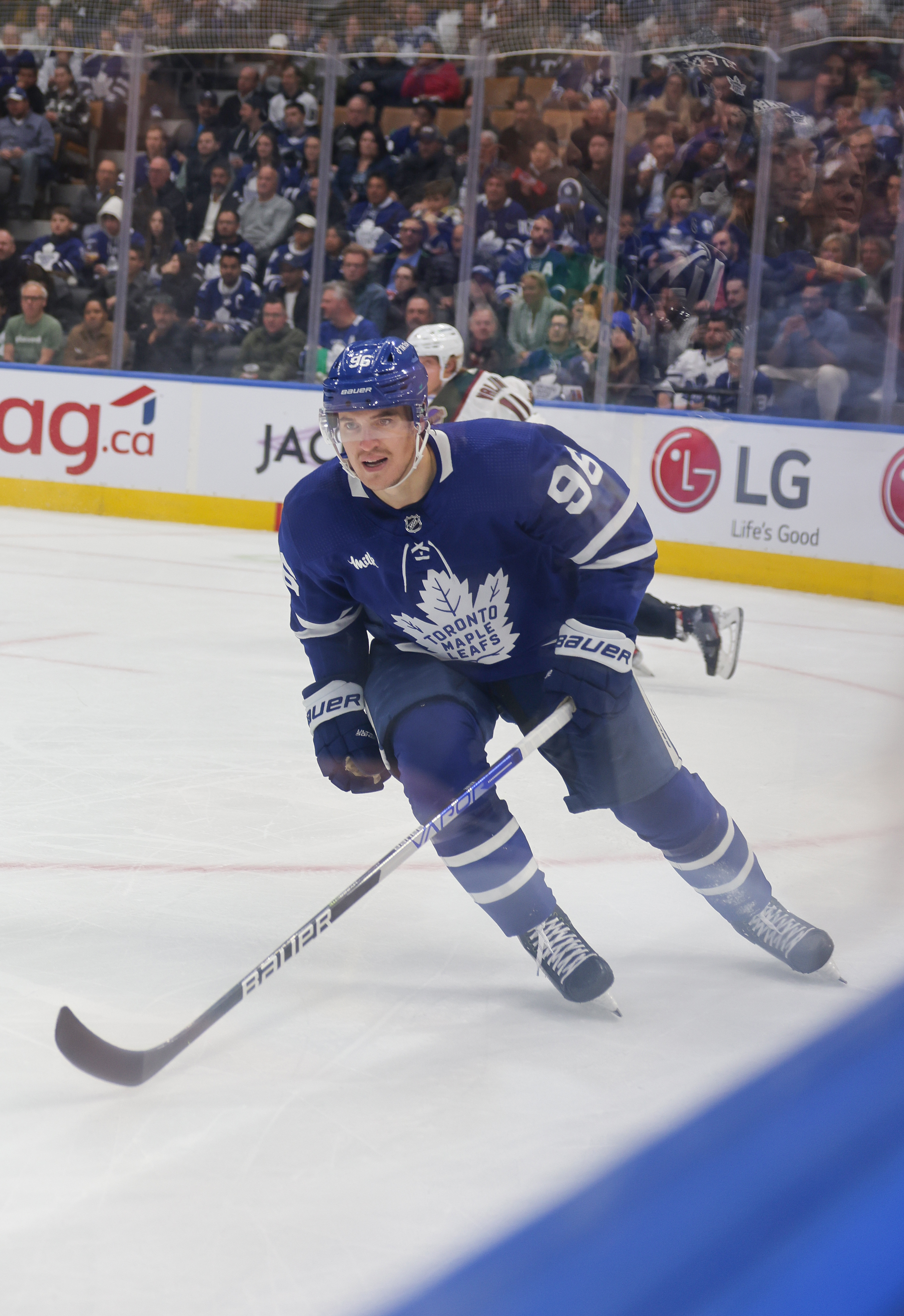
Aubé-Kubel with the Maple Leafs on October 17, 2022

The Avalanche swept the Nashville Predators in the first round of the 2022 Stanley Cup playoffs, with Aubé-Kubel recording 19 hits in the four-game series. He saw limited playing time as the postseason progressed, missing most of the Western Conference Final against the Edmonton Oilers. In the 2022 Stanley Cup Final, the Avalanche defeated the Tampa Bay Lightning in six games to win their first championship since 2001. Aubé-Kubel skated in 14 postseason games, recording no points in the process. Following the win, Aubé-Kubel gained notoriety for dropping and denting the Stanley Cup while carrying it to the team photo.

==== Toronto Maple Leafs ====
On July 13, 2022, the Toronto Maple Leafs signed Aubé-Kubel as a free agent to a one-year, $1 million contract for the 2022–23 season.

==== Washington Capitals ====
On November 4, 2022, the Maple Leafs placed Aubé-Kubel on waivers after he went scoreless in six games. On November 5, he was claimed by the Washington Capitals. Aubé-Kubel scored his first goal as a Capital on January 5, 2023, in the second period of a 6–2 victory over the Columbus Blue Jackets. On March 3, Aubé-Kubel signed a one-year contract extension, worth $1.225 million with the Capitals. Aubé-Kubel appeared in 60 games with the Capitals during the 2023–24 season, scoring 6 goals and 16 points.

==== Buffalo Sabres ====
As a free agent from the Capitals, on July 1, 2024, Aubé-Kubel was signed to a one-year, $1.5 million contract with the Buffalo Sabres for the 2024–25 NHL season.

==== New York Rangers ====
On March 7, 2025, Aubé-Kubel was traded to the New York Rangers in exchange for Erik Brännström. He was initially assigned to the Hartford Wolf Pack, the Rangers AHL affiliate, but he was called up to the Rangers on March 24.

==== Minnesota Wild ====
On July 2, 2025, Aubé-Kubel signed a one-year, two-way $775,000 contract with the Minnesota Wild, starting in the 2025–26 NHL season.

==== Dinamo Minsk ====
Following a lone season within the Wild organization, and after eight seasons in the NHL, Aubé-Kubel left North America as a free agent and was signed to a one-year contract with Belarusian club, HC Dinamo Minsk of the KHL, on August 16, 2026.

== International play ==
Aubé-Kubel was one of 18 Canadian Hockey League players selected to represent Canada Quebec at the 2013 World U-17 Hockey Challenge. He scored four goals and eight total points in six tournament games, and Quebec finished the tournament in fourth place after falling to the United States in the bronze medal match.

== Personal life ==
Aubé-Kubel's cousins, T. J. and Thomas Foster, also play professional ice hockey. T. J. most recently appeared with the Guildford Flames of the Elite Ice Hockey League, while Thomas skated with the Northern Alberta Institute of Technology (NAIT) Ooks.

== Career statistics ==
=== Regular season and playoffs ===
			Regular season					Playoffs
Season	Team	League	GP	G	A	Pts	PIM	GP	G	A	Pts	PIM
2012–13	Val-d'Or Foreurs	QMJHL	64	10	17	27	26	10	1	0	1	8
2013–14	Val-d'Or Foreurs	QMJHL	65	22	31	53	61	24	4	9	13	20
2014–15	Val-d'Or Foreurs	QMJHL	61	38	42	80	81	17	5	10	15	22
2015–16	Val-d'Or Foreurs	QMJHL	61	38	46	84	71	6	3	0	3	12
2015–16	Lehigh Valley Phantoms	AHL	6	2	1	3	6	—	—	—	—	—
2016–17	Lehigh Valley Phantoms	AHL	71	9	9	18	55	4	0	0	0	0
2017–18	Lehigh Valley Phantoms	AHL	72	18	28	46	86	10	0	0	0	8
2018–19	Lehigh Valley Phantoms	AHL	54	16	14	30	69	—	—	—	—	—
2018–19	Philadelphia Flyers	NHL	9	0	0	0	0	—	—	—	—	—
2019–20	Lehigh Valley Phantoms	AHL	26	5	3	8	20	—	—	—	—	—
2019–20	Philadelphia Flyers	NHL	36	7	8	15	19	13	2	1	3	8
2020–21	Philadelphia Flyers	NHL	50	3	9	12	44	—	—	—	—	—
2021–22	Philadelphia Flyers	NHL	7	0	1	1	6	—	—	—	—	—
2021–22	Colorado Avalanche	NHL	67	11	11	22	41	14	0	0	0	4
2022–23	Toronto Maple Leafs	NHL	6	0	0	0	4	—	—	—	—	—
2022–23	Washington Capitals	NHL	47	4	8	12	46	—	—	—	—	—
2023–24	Hershey Bears	AHL	11	1	2	3	4	—	—	—	—	—
2023–24	Washington Capitals	NHL	60	6	10	16	23	3	0	0	0	2
2024–25	Buffalo Sabres	NHL	19	1	1	2	17	—	—	—	—	—
2024–25	Rochester Americans	AHL	12	4	4	8	6	—	—	—	—	—
2024–25	Hartford Wolf Pack	AHL	3	1	0	1	0	—	—	—	—	—
2024–25	New York Rangers	NHL	3	0	0	0	2	—	—	—	—	—
2025–26	Iowa Wild	AHL	62	15	22	37	59	—	—	—	—	—
2025–26	Minnesota Wild	NHL	6	0	2	2	6	—	—	—	—	—
NHL totals			310	32	50	82	208	30	2	1	3	14

=== International ===
Year	Team	Event	Result	GP	G	A	Pts	PIM
2013	Canada Quebec	U17	4th	6	4	4	8	20
Junior totals				6	4	4	8	20

== Awards and honours ==
Award	Year
NHL
Stanley Cup champion	2022
