= Nolan Patrick =

Canadian ice hockey player (born 1998)

- Born: September 19, 1998 (age 28) Winnipeg, Manitoba, Canada
- Height: 6 ft 2 in (188 cm)
- Weight: 201 lb (91 kg; 14 st 5 lb)
- Position: Centre
- Shot: Right
- Played for: Philadelphia Flyers; Vegas Golden Knights
- NHL draft: 2nd overall, 2017; Philadelphia Flyers
- Playing career: 2017–2022

Nolan James Patrick (born September 19, 1998) is a Canadian former professional ice hockey player. He was drafted second overall by the Philadelphia Flyers in the 2017 NHL entry draft and played four seasons with the Flyers and Vegas Golden Knights of the National Hockey League (NHL).

== Playing career ==
=== Junior ===
As Patrick became more involved in ice hockey, his father transformed their family garage into a home gym and he trained with his uncle during the summer. He played AAA Bantam Hockey League Division 1 ice hockey with the Winnipeg Hawks during the 2012–13 season, where he recorded 75 points in 19 games. He missed nearly half of the season due to a shoulder injury, but nonetheless was regarded as a highly touted prospect.

Patrick was selected in first round, fourth overall, by the Brandon Wheat Kings in the 2013 WHL bantam draft. In December 2013, during the midst of the Wheat Kings' 2013–14 season, a high number of injuries to the roster caused him to be called up from the Midget AAA Winnipeg Thrashers. He was initially unavailable upon being called up due to a shoulder injury, and did not play during the call-up. He eventually played three games with the Wheat Kings at the conclusion of his Winnipeg Thrashers' season. He began his rookie season in the 2014–15 season, where he recorded 30 goals and 26 assists for 56 points in 55 games. Between mid-February and mid-March 2015, Patrick missed 12 games with an upper-body injury, although initial reports were that it was a lower-body injury. He was subsequently awarded the Jim Piggott Memorial Trophy as the Western Hockey League's rookie of the year despite missing a total of 17 games that season.

During the 2015–16 season, Patrick finished fifth in league scoring and was the first 17-year-old Wheat Kings' player to record over 100 points since 1976–77 when Ray Allison and Brian Propp both eclipsed the century mark. He played an integral part in winning the Ed Chynoweth Cup, leading all players in postseason points and was named the WHL Playoff MVP. After the season, it was revealed that Patrick had suffered a sports hernia injury on April 27, 2016, during game 4 of the WHL's Eastern Conference finals series against the Red Deer Rebels and had played through the WHL finals and 2016 Memorial Cup with the injury. Following the 2015–16 campaign, he received sports hernia surgery.

For the 2016–17 season, Patrick was named captain of the Wheat Kings. Beginning the season, Patrick was widely considered the top prospect of the 2017 NHL entry draft. Dan Marr, NHL director of Central Scouting said "Patrick is as complete an NHL package as you are going to find. From his pedigree, his skills, and assets, to his performance impact to date, he has everything any NHL team is looking for in a top prospect." After playing six games to begin the season, however, the Wheat Kings announced on October 14, 2016, that Patrick had once again been sidelined with an upper-body injury. Despite initially being diagnosed as day-to-day, the injury continued through November, when it was revealed to be a complication of the previous season's sports hernia injury.

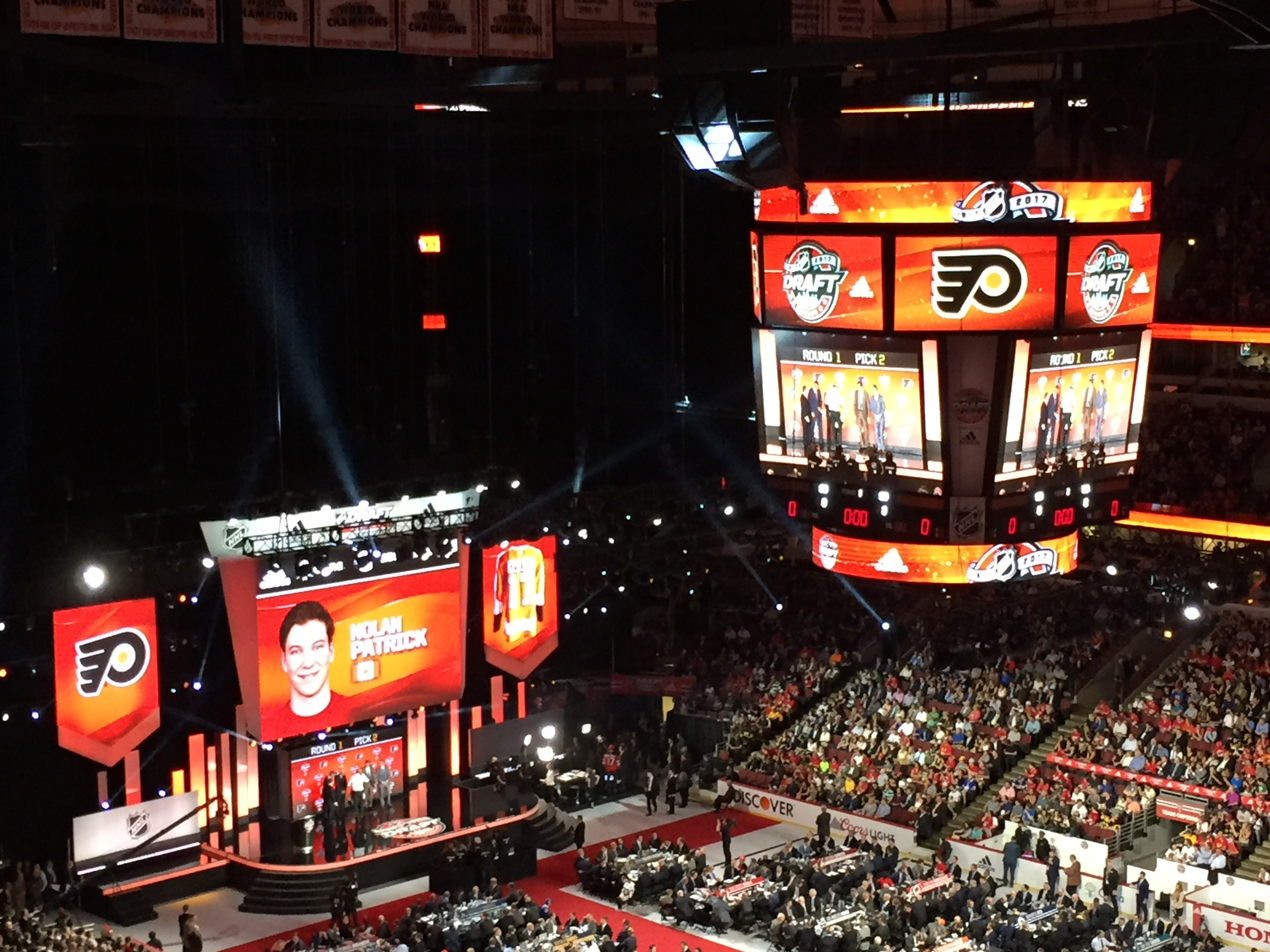
Patrick selected by the Philadelphia Flyers at the 2017 NHL entry draft.

Despite missing most of the regular season and all four playoff games due to injuries, Patrick was ranked the No. 1 North American skater by NHL Central Scouting. Dan Marr stated "He has more than proven over the last three years that he is the real deal and he will be an impact NHL player". On June 23, 2017, Patrick was selected second overall by the Philadelphia Flyers in the 2017 NHL entry draft. On July 17, Patrick was signed to a three-year, entry-level contract with the Philadelphia Flyers. Before the Flyers' development camp started, it was announced that Patrick would not participate, because he was recovering from abdominal surgery performed on June 13.

=== Professional ===
==== Philadelphia Flyers ====
Patrick made his NHL debut on October 4, 2017, against the San Jose Sharks. He registered his first NHL point in his third game with an assist on sophomore Ivan Provorov's goal against the Anaheim Ducks in a 3–2 overtime win. Patrick scored his first NHL goal against the Nashville Predators in his fourth game on October 10, with 9:25 remaining in the second period. He was hit by Anaheim Ducks player Chris Wagner on October 24, and missed nine games to recover from the injury. Patrick ended the regular season with 30 points in 73 games.

During his rookie season, the Flyers made the Stanley Cup playoffs and faced the Pittsburgh Penguins in the first round. In game 2 of the series, Patrick notched his first NHL playoff goal. He ended the postseason with two points in six games. On July 21, 2018, Patrick was selected as the No. 1 breakout player for the 2018–19 season by NHL Network.

While exercising during the 2019 off-season, Patrick began to feel headaches and felt his performance suffer as a result. He was initially diagnosed with an "upper-body injury" at the Flyers' training camp, and in September, a neurologist from the University of Michigan diagnosed Patrick with a migraine disorder. When general manager Chuck Fletcher announced Patrick's diagnosis, he clarified that the migraines were not believed to be related to ice hockey, and that the condition ran in Patrick's family. He began skating with the team in February 2020, and had hoped to start playing before the end of the regular season. On March 12, the 2019–20 NHL season was suspended indefinitely due to the COVID-19 pandemic. When the NHL began their "Return to Play Plan" in July, Patrick was not on the Flyers' training camp roster.

On October 16, 2020, Patrick accepted a one-year qualifying offer from the Flyers, with a value of $874,125. Going into the Flyers' 2020–21 training camp, Patrick cleared all medical protocols and began practicing on a line with Travis Konecny and Carsen Twarynski. Patrick scored a goal in the Flyers' season opener, a 6–3 win over the Pittsburgh Penguins. It was his first NHL game in 650 days. He failed to carry that momentum through the rest of the pandemic-shortened season; Patrick played in 52 of the Flyers' 56 games, recording only four goals and five assists and putting up a –30 plus-minus in the process. Patrick told reporters afterwards that he felt "like I came in behind the eight-ball", and that, at the start of the season, he had avoided strong contact due to his migraine disorder. He missed two games in the middle of April after taking a shot from teammate Philippe Myers off of the ear, an injury that Patrick worried would amplify his headaches.

==== Vegas Golden Knights ====
After the 2020–21 season, Patrick acquired a new agent, leading to rumours that he was going to request a trade from the Flyers. On July 17, 2021, shortly before the 2021 NHL expansion draft, the Flyers traded Patrick and Philippe Myers to the Nashville Predators in exchange for Ryan Ellis. While Myers remained in Nashville, the Predators immediately flipped Patrick to the Vegas Golden Knights to acquire forward Cody Glass. The trade reunited Patrick with Kelly McCrimmon, Vegas' general manager who was Patrick's head coach (and general manager) during their time together with the Brandon Wheat Kings. Two months later, Vegas signed Patrick to a two-year, $2.4 million contract. The Golden Knights suffered a rash of injuries through the first few games of the 2021–22 season, and Patrick was sidelined with an upper-body injury on October 22, following his first goal of the season in a 5–3 loss to the Edmonton Oilers.

The Golden Knights won the Stanley Cup in the 2022–23 season without Patrick and ultimately chose not to ask for an exemption to allow his name to be engraved on the Cup with the rest of the team. On June 30, 2023, the Golden Knights chose not to qualify Patrick, a restricted free agent, a contract, and he became an unrestricted free agent for the first time in his career.

== International play ==
Medal record

Men's ice hockey

Representing Canada

IH18
Gold medal – first place	2014	

In November 2014, Patrick was named captain for Canada Red at the 2014 World U-17 Hockey Challenge.

On December 5, 2016, Hockey Canada announced that Patrick had not been medically cleared to participate in Canada junior team's training camp and thus would not play in the 2017 World Junior Championships, although he was later invited to Canada's World Junior Summer Showcase prior to the 2018 World Junior Championships.

== Personal life ==
Patrick comes from a family with a sports background. His father, Steve, played 250 games in the NHL and his mother, Carrie (née Chernomaz), played volleyball for the University of Winnipeg and the Canadian national volleyball team, earning a Canada roster spot for the 1996 Summer Olympics but a torn anterior cruciate ligament (ACL) prevented her from participating. On his paternal side, his grandfather, Stephen Patrick, played football for the Winnipeg Blue Bombers and later became a politician. His uncle, James Patrick, played 1,280 games in the NHL and served as assistant coach for the Buffalo Sabres and Dallas Stars prior to serving as head coach in the WHL. As a teen, Patrick trained with his uncle during the summer and has credited his uncle's influence as "huge" to his career. His paternal aunt, Tara, played collegiate volleyball at the University of Winnipeg where she and Patrick's mother were teammates. On his maternal side, his uncle, Rich Chernomaz, played 51 games in the NHL.

Patrick's two sisters also played ice hockey. His older sister, Madison, was a defenceman for the University of British Columbia from 2014 to 2019. His younger sister, Aimee, plays for the University of Manitoba.

Patrick is of Ukrainian descent through his paternal great-grandfather, with the original family surname being "Patrebka."

Patrick and his family are also avid hunters. They own a cabin on Falcon Lake where he hunts with a rifle, bow, or spear.

== Career statistics ==
=== Regular season and playoffs ===
			Regular season					Playoffs
Season	Team	League	GP	G	A	Pts	PIM	GP	G	A	Pts	PIM
2013–14	Winnipeg Thrashers	MMHL	39	33	30	63	42	8	3	7	10	6
2013–14	Brandon Wheat Kings	WHL	3	1	0	1	0	9	0	0	0	2
2014–15	Brandon Wheat Kings	WHL	55	30	26	56	19	19	8	7	15	14
2015–16	Brandon Wheat Kings	WHL	72	41	61	102	41	21	13	17	30	16
2016–17	Brandon Wheat Kings	WHL	33	20	26	46	36	—	—	—	—	—
2017–18	Philadelphia Flyers	NHL	73	13	17	30	30	6	1	1	2	0
2018–19	Philadelphia Flyers	NHL	72	13	18	31	27	—	—	—	—	—
2020–21	Philadelphia Flyers	NHL	52	4	5	9	20	—	—	—	—	—
2021–22	Vegas Golden Knights	NHL	25	2	5	7	6	—	—	—	—	—
NHL totals			222	32	45	77	83	6	1	1	2	0

=== International ===
Year	Team	Event	Result	GP	G	A	Pts	PIM
2014	Canada Red	U17	6th	5	0	5	5	6
2015	Canada	IH18	1st place, gold medalist(s)	4	3	2	5	6
Junior totals				9	3	7	10	12

Awards and achievements
Preceded by German Rubtsov	Philadelphia Flyers first-round draft pick 2017	Succeeded by Morgan Frost
