= Philippe Myers =

Canadian ice hockey player (born 1997)

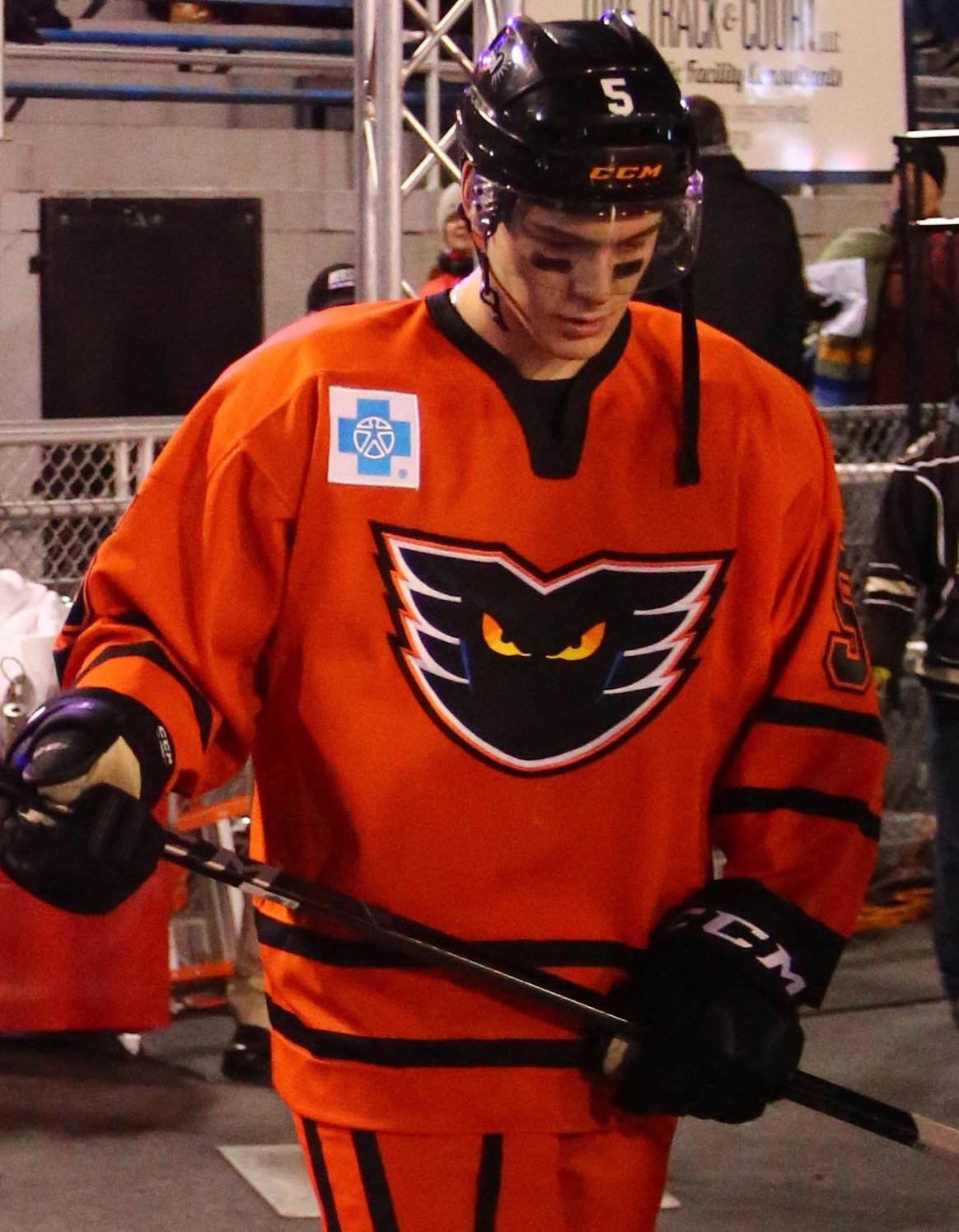
- Myers with the Lehigh Valley Phantoms in 2018
- Born: January 25, 1997 (age 29) Moncton, New Brunswick, Canada
- Height: 6 ft 5 in (196 cm)
- Weight: 209 lb (95 kg; 14 st 13 lb)
- Position: Defence
- Shoots: Right
- NHL team (P) Cur. team Former teams: Toronto Maple Leafs; Toronto Marlies (AHL); Philadelphia Flyers; Nashville Predators; Tampa Bay Lightning
- National team: Canada
- NHL draft: Undrafted
- Playing career: 2017–present

Philippe Myers (born January 25, 1997) is a Canadian professional ice hockey player who is a defenceman for the Toronto Marlies in the American Hockey League (AHL) while under contract to the Toronto Maple Leafs of the National Hockey League (NHL).

== Early life ==
Myers was born on January 25, 1997, in Moncton, New Brunswick, and was raised in Dieppe, New Brunswick. He is the only child of Dave and Suzanne Myers, and relied on his family for motivation throughout his hockey career. The son of an English-speaking father and bilingual mother, Myers attended Francophone school, and became comfortable in both French and English. As an adolescent, he played minor ice hockey with the Moncton Flyers midget AAA league.

== Playing career ==
=== Junior ===
The Rouyn-Noranda Huskies of the Quebec Major Junior Hockey League (QMJHL) selected Myers in the fourth round, 58th overall, of the 2013 QMJHL entry draft.

=== Professional ===
==== Philadelphia Flyers ====
Myers was signed as an undrafted free agent by the Flyers on September 21, 2015. After his stellar play during the 2015–16 season, NHL scouts believed he would have been a first-round pick in the 2016 NHL entry draft if the Flyers had not signed him. He made his NHL debut on February 17, 2019, in a game against the Detroit Red Wings. Myers would go on to score his first career goal on March 6, 2019, in a game against the Washington Capitals.

Myers was one of the Flyers' final roster cuts as they entered the 2019–20 season, but he was called up on October 31 to add life to a team that had lost their last two games by a combined 12–4 score. With seven defensemen on their roster, Myers was part of a three-man platoon with Robert Hägg and occasionally Shayne Gostisbehere through the first half of the season. By the end of January, Myers had become a staple in the Flyers' lineup, tied with Carson Soucy of the Minnesota Wild for the best plus-minus (+16) among all NHL rookies. On the second defensive pairing with Travis Sanheim, Myers had four goals and 16 points in 50 games before the NHL season was prematurely suspended that March due to the COVID-19 pandemic. Shortly before the season's abrupt end, Myers fractured his right patella while blocking a shot from Jack Eichel of the Buffalo Sabres; he was expected to miss a month of play, leaving room for Gostisbehere, who had also suffered a knee injury earlier that year, to take his place in the lineup. By the time the NHL began crafting their "return to play" plan for the 2020 Stanley Cup playoffs, however, Myers had fully recovered from the injury and was ready to make his first postseason appearance alongside Sanheim. He played in all 16 playoff games before the Flyers were eliminated by the New York Islanders, contributing three goals and four points, including the overtime game-winning goal in Game 2 against the Islanders.

On December 8, 2020, the Flyers signed Myers to a three-year contract extension carrying an average annual value of $2.55 million. When the sudden retirement of Matt Niskanen left an unexpected gap on the Flyers' top defensive pairing, Myers was the first choice to play alongside Ivan Provorov for the 2020–21 season. Only four games into the season, however, Myers suffered a fractured rib after colliding with Jake McCabe of the Buffalo Sabres, and Sanheim was promoted to the top line in his place. Even after he recovered, Myers moved in and out of the Flyers lineup as he struggled to regain his form from the previous season. The repeated benching was itself a cause of frustration, as limited time on the ice also gave players like Myers little opportunity to fix their performance. Through the first three-quarters of the season, Myers had only eight points, all assists, and a −12 rating, but he was confident that he was "definitely moving in the right direction" going into the last 11 games. Through 44 games of the pandemic-shortened season, Myers had one goal and 10 assists. That one goal came on April 27, in a 6–4 defeat at the hands of the New Jersey Devils. Myers's difficulties were especially pronounced on the defensive end: when he was on the ice, the Flyers' opponents scored 56 goals against them.

==== Nashville Predators ====
On July 17, 2021, the Flyers traded Myers and Nolan Patrick to the Nashville Predators in exchange for defenseman Ryan Ellis. While Patrick was immediately flipped to the Vegas Golden Knights in exchange for Cody Glass, Myers remained with Nashville as part of their larger roster revamp, which aimed to create a strong core of younger players. Through the first 11 games of the 2021–22 season, however, Myers played in only three, with Alexandre Carrier, Dante Fabbro, and Matt Benning serving as the Predators' right-side defensemen. On March 23, 2022, days after Nashville placed Myers on waivers and clearing, he was loaned to the Toronto Marlies following a trade on March 21, that saw Toronto Maple Leafs defenceman Alex Biega being traded to the Nashville Predators for future considerations. Myers being loaned to the Marlies under contract to the Maple Leafs was the future considerations aspect of the deal.

==== Tampa Bay Lightning ====
Following a tough first season with the Predators, on July 3, 2022, Myers was traded to the Tampa Bay Lightning along with Grant Mismash in exchange for Ryan McDonagh. On August 26, 2022, his contract was extended by one year for $1.4 million.

==== Toronto Maple Leafs ====
A free agent from the Lightning, Myers signed a one-year, two-way contract with the Toronto Maple Leafs on July 2, 2024. He played his first game with the Leafs on October 26, 2024.

== International play ==
Medal record

Ice hockey

Representing Canada

World Championships
Silver medal – second place	2019 Slovakia	

World Junior Championships
Silver medal – second place	2017 Canada	

Myers first represented Canada on the international stage at the 2017 World Junior Championships, held in Montreal-Toronto, Canada. He registered 3 assists in just 4 games as Canada claimed the Silver Medal as the host nation, losing the final to the United States. Partway through the tournament, Myers sustained an injury from Minnesota Wild prospect Luke Kunin that put him out of commission for the rest of the WJC.

Myers was a late inclusion to join Team Canada at the 2019 World Championships underway in Slovakia on May 15, 2019. Recalled to the squad as an injury replacement for Brandon Montour, Myers made his full international debut in a 5–2 round-robin victory over France on May 16, 2019. Myers helped Canada progress through to the playoff rounds before losing the final to Finland to finish with the Silver Medal on May 26, 2019. He finished the tournament posting 1 assist from the blueline in 7 games.

== Personal life ==
Myers is a self-taught pianist who, rather than reading sheet music, learns music by ear from watching YouTube videos.

== Career statistics ==
=== Regular season and playoffs ===
			Regular season					Playoffs
Season	Team	League	GP	G	A	Pts	PIM	GP	G	A	Pts	PIM
2013–14	Rouyn-Noranda Huskies	QMJHL	46	0	4	4	11	9	0	3	3	2
2014–15	Rouyn-Noranda Huskies	QMJHL	60	2	6	8	55	6	0	2	2	15
2015–16	Rouyn-Noranda Huskies	QMJHL	63	17	28	45	44	20	4	12	16	18
2016–17	Rouyn-Noranda Huskies	QMJHL	34	10	25	35	46	13	3	6	9	14
2017–18	Lehigh Valley Phantoms	AHL	50	5	16	21	54	13	3	4	7	12
2018–19	Lehigh Valley Phantoms	AHL	53	9	24	33	78	—	—	—	—	—
2018–19	Philadelphia Flyers	NHL	21	1	1	2	2	—	—	—	—	—
2019–20	Lehigh Valley Phantoms	AHL	6	0	4	4	4	—	—	—	—	—
2019–20	Philadelphia Flyers	NHL	50	4	12	16	30	16	3	1	4	8
2020–21	Philadelphia Flyers	NHL	44	1	10	11	22	—	—	—	—	—
2021–22	Nashville Predators	NHL	27	1	3	4	12	—	—	—	—	—
2021–22	Toronto Marlies	AHL	16	2	5	7	23	—	—	—	—	—
2022–23	Tampa Bay Lightning	NHL	11	1	2	3	4	—	—	—	—	—
2022–23	Syracuse Crunch	AHL	52	8	21	29	88	5	1	1	2	10
2023–24	Syracuse Crunch	AHL	61	4	19	23	67	8	0	3	3	2
2023–24	Tampa Bay Lightning	NHL	5	0	0	0	2	—	—	—	—	—
2024–25	Toronto Maple Leafs	NHL	36	2	3	5	15	—	—	—	—	—
2024–25	Toronto Marlies	AHL	3	0	0	0	4	—	—	—	—	—
2025–26	Toronto Maple Leafs	NHL	39	0	2	2	22	—	—	—	—	—
NHL totals			233	10	33	43	109	16	3	1	4	8

=== International ===
Year	Team	Event	Result	GP	G	A	Pts	PIM
2014	Canada Atlantic	U17	8th	5	0	0	0	0
2017	Canada	WJC	2nd place, silver medalist(s)	4	0	3	3	4
2019	Canada	WC	2nd place, silver medalist(s)	7	0	1	1	0
Junior totals				9	0	3	3	4
Senior totals				7	0	1	1	0

== Awards and honours ==
Award	Year
QMJHL
Best P Plus–minus (+52)	2016
First All-Star Team	2016
