= Travis Konecny =

Canadian ice hockey player (born 1997)

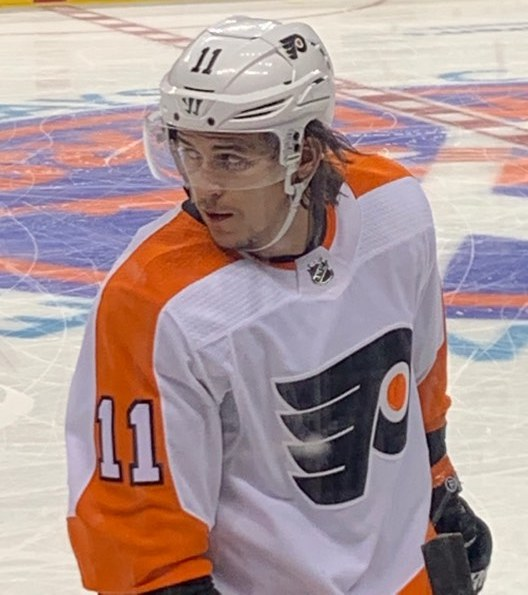
- Konecny with the Philadelphia Flyers in 2020
- Born: March 11, 1997 (age 29) London, Ontario, Canada
- Height: 5 ft 10 in (178 cm)
- Weight: 192 lb (87 kg; 13 st 10 lb)
- Position: Forward
- Shoots: Right
- NHL team: Philadelphia Flyers
- National team: Canada
- NHL draft: 24th overall, 2015; Philadelphia Flyers
- Playing career: 2016–present

Travis Konecny (/koʊˈnɛkniː/ koh-NEK-nee; born March 11, 1997) is a Canadian professional ice hockey player who is a forward and alternate captain for the Philadelphia Flyers of the National Hockey League (NHL). The Flyers selected him in the first round, 24th overall, of the 2015 NHL entry draft.

Born in London, Ontario, and raised in Clachan, Konecny grew up watching hockey on television while practicing on frozen ponds. His minor ice hockey career began with the local Chatham-Kent Cyclones, but he soon moved closer to London in order to attend the PEAC hockey academy and play for the Elgin-Middlesex Chiefs of the Alliance Hockey organization. His 114-point season in 2012–13 caught the eye of the Ottawa 67's of the Ontario Hockey League (OHL), who selected Konecny first overall in the 2013 OHL draft. Konecny played two and a half seasons of junior ice hockey for Ottawa before he was traded to the Sarnia Sting at the start of 2016 in exchange for two players and eight OHL draft picks. During his junior hockey tenure, Konecny also represented Canada at a number of international tournaments, including the Ivan Hlinka Memorial Tournament and the World Juniors.

Just prior to the 2016–17 season, the Flyers announced that both Konecny and his fellow 2015 first-round draftee Ivan Provorov would bypass the traditional tryout period for rookies and would play in the NHL for the entire season. Konecny's first two seasons in the NHL were uneven, with both scoring streak and slumps, and coach Dave Hakstol would frequently move his skaters up and down offensive lines. After Hakstol's firing in December 2018, Konecny found a steady position with Claude Giroux and James van Riemsdyk, and his scoring became consistent. He led the Flyers in scoring for the 2019–20 season, but ran into offensive difficulties after the interruptions caused by the COVID-19 pandemic, first with a goal drought in the 2020 Stanley Cup playoffs followed by a lackluster performance in the 2020–21 season. Since then, Konecny has led the Flyers in points for five consecutive seasons.

== Early life ==
Konecny was born on March 11, 1997, in London, Ontario. He grew up in nearby Clachan with his father Rob, a firefighter; mother Terri-Lee, a worker with autistic children; and brother Chase, an engineering student. Outside of his immediate family, Konecny's cousin Bo Horvat also played ice hockey from a young age. Because Clachan was too small to have its own ice rink, Konecny would practice on frozen ponds and would watch hockey games to develop his skills. He was also childhood friends with Lawson Crouse, who he met when they tried out for the same hockey team at the age of six. Coaches started to notice Konecny when, at the age of 10, he scored four goals and an assist in one period of a youth ice hockey tournament.

Although he began playing minor ice hockey with the local Chatham-Kent Cyclones, when Konecny was 14 years old he moved to Mount Brydges, where he joined the Elgin-Middlesex Chiefs of the Alliance Hockey organization and began attending the PEAC hockey academy in London. Smaller than most of his teammates, Konecny was known for his physical style of play, with 24 penalty minutes through the first nine games of the 2012–13 season. He told reporters, "I don't take stupid penalties [...] I like to battle and I don't like to lose a puck battle or a race to the puck." He was also a strong scorer, recording 53 goals and 61 assists in 54 games that season. Elgin-Middlesex, meanwhile, captured the Alliance championship, sweeping the Waterloo Wolves. In the final game of the championship tournament, Konecny received a 10-minute misconduct penalty for fighting.

== Playing career ==
=== Junior ===
The Ottawa 67's of the Ontario Hockey League (OHL), who were entering a rebuilding year after finishing the 2012–13 season with a 16–46–6 record, selected Konecny first overall in the 2013 OHL draft, an honour that came with the Jack Ferguson Award for the top OHL draft pick of the year. Younger than most of his new teammates and opponents at only 16, Konecny registered two assists in his OHL debut, a 5–4 win over the Belleville Bulls. While the 67's once again missed the OHL playoffs, Konecny had a dominant rookie season, scoring 26 goals and 44 assists while playing on an offensive line alongside Erik Bradford and Ryan Van Stralen. Leading all OHL rookies in scoring for the 2013–14 season, Konecny was named Rookie of the Month on four out of six possible opportunities, and at the end of the season, he received the Emms Family Award for OHL Rookie of the Year. He was also named to the OHL First All-Rookie team that year at centre.

Going into his second year with the 67's, Konecny was named team captain for the 2014–15 season. Although he had a slow start to the season, with only three goals and 12 points through his first 18 games, Konecny soon recovered, finishing second on the 67's in scoring with 29 goals and 68 points in 60 regular season games. Ottawa reached the playoffs, and Konecny recorded an additional three goals and 10 points in five games there. That year, the Philadelphia Flyers of the National Hockey League traded two picks in the 2015 NHL entry draft to the Toronto Maple Leafs in exchange for the 24th overall pick, which they used to draft Konecny in the first round. The Flyers' other first-round pick, Ivan Provorov of the Brandon Wheat Kings, had played alongside Konecny at the CHL/NHL Top Prospects Game earlier that year. Konecny signed an entry-level contract with Philadelphia on July 16, 2015. At the end of the season, the NHL awarded Konecny the inaugural E.J. McGuire Award of Excellence, given to the prospect who "best exemplifies the commitment to excellence" in hockey "through strength of character, competitiveness and athleticism."

After attending the Flyers' training camp, Konecny was sent back to his junior hockey team in time for the start of the 2015–16 OHL season. There, he posted nine goals and 45 points in his third OHL season before becoming part of a major trade with the Sarnia Sting on January 6, 2016. Konecny and Sam Studnicka were sent to Sarnia in exchange for Sasha Chmelevski, Chase Campbell, and eight picks in that year's OHL draft, with an option for two extra draft picks if Konecny spent the 2016–17 season in the OHL as well. With Sarnia, Konecny played with future NHL players Jordan Kyrou, Jakob Chychrun, and Pavel Zacha. After the trade, Konecny scored 23 goals and 56 points in the remaining 31 games of the regular season, and added a goal and two assists in his first two playoff games before a shoulder injury put his postseason run on pause. Although Konecny was meant to rejoin the team for game five of the first-round OHL playoff series, Sarnia was swept in four games by the Plymouth Whalers.

=== Professional ===
On October 10, 2016, Flyers general manager Ron Hextall announced that both Konecny and Provorov had been named to the opening-night roster for the 2016–17 season, and that they were foregoing the usual nine-game tryout period for junior-aged rookies. Konecny was set to begin the season on the second offensive line, alongside Sean Couturier and Jakub Voráček. His first two professional hockey points came in his NHL debut on October 15, with two assists in a 4–2 defeat of the Los Angeles Kings. Konecny's first NHL goal came on October 26, in the third period of a 4–3 win over the Buffalo Sabres. His goal broke open the scoring for Philadelphia, who recorded three power play goals in the third period to take Buffalo to overtime and an eventual shootout win. His first major penalty for fighting came a month later, as the 5 feet 10 inches (1.78 m) Konecny went up against the 6 feet 0 inches (1.83 m) Brandon Pirri of the New York Rangers on November 25. By January 2017, Konecny had been flipped from the left wing to the right, and had been moved up to the top line with Claude Giroux and Michael Raffl, although coach Dave Hakstol continued to shift skaters around while attempting to find a rhythm for the team. After taking a hit against the St. Louis Blues on February 6, Konecny was confined to a walking boot with leg and ankle injuries, and was expected to miss four to six weeks of the season. He missed nine games before returning to the lineup on March 4 for a 2–1 loss to the Washington Capitals, playing on the fourth-line in order to slowly return to full skating. Overall, Konecny had an uneven rookie season, with 11 goals and 17 assists in 68 games and a ±0 plus–minus score.

Konecny started the 2017–18 season in a sophomore slump, with only one goal in the first 16 games of the season. Hakstol voiced concerns that Konecny was "trying to put a little too much emphasis on scoring", which was limiting his impact on the rest of the game. After being demoted to the fourth line with Scott Laughton and Taylor Leier, Konecny scored his second goal of the season on December 13, with a tying goal in the Flyers' eventual 4–2 win over the Maple Leafs. He was able to turn his performance around in the second half of the season, recording 33 points in the last 41 regular season games for a total of 24 goals and 47 points in 81 contests. Most of his success came after being moved back up to the first line with Giroux and Couturier. The one regular season game he missed was on February 22 against the Columbus Blue Jackets, following a left foot injury sustained in the previous game. The Flyers faced division rivals the Pittsburgh Penguins in the first round of the 2018 Stanley Cup playoffs, and Konecny scored his first NHL postseason goal in game two, which the Flyers took 5–1. The Flyers ultimately fell to the Penguins in six games.

Heading into the 2018–19 season, Hakstol wanted to give Konecny a chance not only as the top line right winger, but on the Flyers' penalty kill unit, which had suffered the previous year. Through the first 10 games of the season, however, a number of skaters saw their positions rotate, with Konecny playing at various points alongside Giroux, Couturier, Nolan Patrick, Oskar Lindblom, and Jordan Weal. His position on the team solidified when the Flyers made a number of front office moves in December, with both Hextall and Hakstol ousted from their respective positions. Finishing the year on a line with Giroux and James van Riemsdyk, Konecny scored 24 goals and recorded 49 points while playing all 82 regular season games. While his numbers were similar to the previous season, Konecny's output was more consistent in 2018–19: his worst stretch involved six points in 14 games in December, compared to the previous season's first-half drought. He also completed his first career Gordie Howe hat trick that season, with a goal and an assist against Henrik Lundqvist and a brawl with Ryan Strome in a 4–0 shutout win over the Rangers on November 23.

A restricted free agent during the 2019 off-season, Konecny's agent and the Flyers spent the summer negotiating a potential contract extension, with disagreements arising over Konecny's qualifying offer. On September 16, the Flyers signed Konceny to a six-year, $33 million contract extension that carried an average annual value of $5.5 million. After a strong start to the season in which he led the Flyers with 11 goals and 17 assists, Konecny was removed from a game against the Ottawa Senators on December 7 after taking a hit from Mark Borowiecki, and he was indefinitely placed on concussion protocols. He missed three games, all of which the Flyers lost, before returning to the lineup on December 17 in time for a 4–1 win over the Anaheim Ducks. Konecny received his first NHL All-Star Game invitation that season, where he recorded three assists in the Metropolitan Division's 9–5 loss to the Atlantic Division All-Star team. By the time that the 2019–20 season was indefinitely paused due to the COVID-19 pandemic, Konecny led the team in scoring with 24 goals and a career-high 61 points in 66 games. When the NHL returned to play for the 2020 Stanley Cup playoffs, Konecny was invited to join the team in the Toronto "bubble", where he played on a line with Laughton and Kevin Hayes. Konecny was unable to carry his regular season momentum into the playoffs, with no goals but seven assists in 16 postseason games, as the Flyers fell to the New York Islanders in the second round.

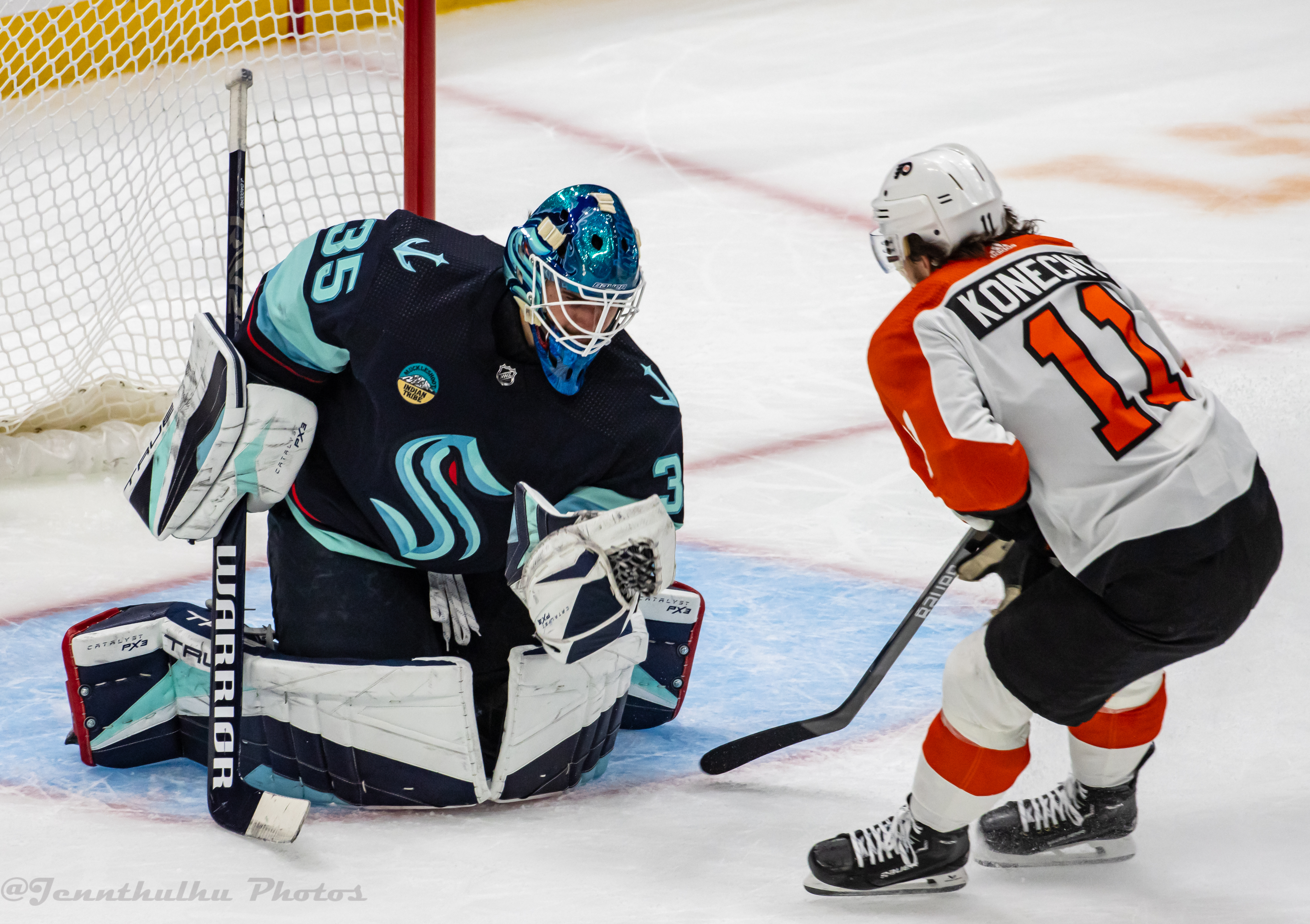
Konecny makes a play on goaltender Joey Daccord of the Seattle Kraken in 2023

Konecny scored his first career hat trick in the second game of the 2020–21 season, lifting the Flyers to a 5–2 win over the Penguins. After opening the season with five goals in as many games, however, Konecny entered a slump, with only four shots in the next seven matches. When the Flyers suffered an outbreak of the COVID-19 virus, Konecny was removed from play on February 14. He returned on March 2, playing on the fourth line with Raffl and Connor Bunnaman, and scored his first goal in nine games on March 6. While he followed his 12-game goalless drought in March with a scoring surge in April and more consistent offensive play through the end of the season, Konecny was one of several younger Flyers who saw a noticeable downturn in the 2020–21 season. He played in 50 games of the truncated 56-game season, recording 11 goals and 34 points in the process. Unlike the other players diagnosed with COVID-19, Konecny's production increased after he recovered from the virus, rising from 0.67 to 0.80 points per game.

On July 25, 2024, the Flyers signed Konecny to an eight-year, $70 million contract extension. By mid January 2026, during the 2025–26 season Konecny had 38 points with 14 goals and 24 assists and a +14 rating in 42 games, and had played in a streak of 143 games before receiving an upper body injury during a game against the Toronto Maple Leafs and being considered a day-to-day status. After returning to practice a few days later, Konecny took a puck to his knee resulting in him ending practice.

== International play ==
Medal record

Men's ice hockey

Representing Canada

World Championships
Silver medal – second place	2017 Germany/France	

4 Nations Face-Off
Winner	2025 Canada/United States	

IIHF World U18 Championships
Bronze medal – third place	2014 Finland	

Konecny made his international debut with a number of performances for Canada's under-18 team in 2014. He first appeared as captain of the Canada Ontario team at the World U-17 Hockey Challenge. Konecny recorded one goal and three assists in five games of the tournament, in which Ontario took fifth place. He next captained Canada at the 2014 Ivan Hlinka Memorial Tournament, with five goals and six points in five games for the gold medal-winning team. Although he did not captain the Canadian team at the 2014 World U18 Championships, Konecny did score a goal in the bronze medal match against Sweden, which Canada won 3–1.

Two years later, Konecny represented the Canada junior team at the 2016 World Junior Championships, where he played alongside fellow Philadelphia prospect Travis Sanheim. Although Konecny had a goal and an assist in five tournament games, Canada lost to Finland in the quarterfinals and were kept from medal contention. He would medal the following year in his senior national team debut, registering eight assists for the second-place team at the 2017 World Championship. Konecny was one of five Flyers on the Canadian team that year, joining Couturier, Giroux, Brayden Schenn, and Wayne Simmonds.

Konecny was part of the Canadian team line-up for the 2025 4 Nations Face-Off, and was a health scratch for the gold medal game between the United States and Canada, with Canada winning 3–2 in overtime. As a result he was filmed, receiving a piggy back ride from fellow player Brad Marchand to receive his medal, instead of walking across the ice in dress shoes. He was also announced to be named to the Canadian team for the 2025 World Championships.

== Player profile ==
Coming into the NHL at only 5 ft 10 in (1.78 m) and 176 lb (80 kg), Konecny is physically much smaller than most NHL players, and like former teammate Shayne Gostisbehere, his coaches have encouraged him to focus on honing his speed and agility on the ice rather than strength. Unlike Gostisbehere, however, Konecny has also shown a physical style of play and is unafraid to hit larger opponents, a technique that has earned comparisons to Tampa Bay Lightning forward Ryan Callahan. Early in his NHL career, Konecny would sometimes clash with his coaches for making too many high-risk plays; with age, coaches and sportswriters have praised his improved decision-making and carefulness when making plays. Konecny is also talkative on the ice, frequently chirping insults at his opponents to distract or irritate them.

== Personal life ==
Konecny is of Czech ancestry on his father's side, and was taught a few phrases of the Czech language by his grandfather. His cousin Bo Horvat also plays in the NHL. Because Horvat is two years older than Konecny, the pair rarely played with or against each other on childhood teams, but regularly faced each other starting at the junior level.

Konecny and his wife Karly, have two children. His wife's twin sister Kristin is married to Brody Sutter who is the son of Duane Sutter.

== Career statistics ==
=== Regular season and playoffs ===
			Regular season					Playoffs
Season	Team	League	GP	G	A	Pts	PIM	GP	G	A	Pts	PIM
2012–13	Elgin-Middlesex Chiefs	AMHL	54	53	61	114	—	—	—	—	—	—
2013–14	Ottawa 67's	OHL	63	26	44	70	18	—	—	—	—	—
2014–15	Ottawa 67's	OHL	60	29	39	68	34	5	3	7	10	6
2015–16	Ottawa 67's	OHL	29	7	38	45	6	—	—	—	—	—
2015–16	Sarnia Sting	OHL	31	23	33	56	21	2	1	2	3	0
2016–17	Philadelphia Flyers	NHL	70	11	17	28	49	—	—	—	—	—
2017–18	Philadelphia Flyers	NHL	81	24	23	47	46	6	1	0	1	10
2018–19	Philadelphia Flyers	NHL	82	24	25	49	40	—	—	—	—	—
2019–20	Philadelphia Flyers	NHL	66	24	37	61	28	16	0	7	7	14
2020–21	Philadelphia Flyers	NHL	50	11	23	34	26	—	—	—	—	—
2021–22	Philadelphia Flyers	NHL	79	16	36	52	77	—	—	—	—	—
2022–23	Philadelphia Flyers	NHL	60	31	30	61	77	—	—	—	—	—
2023–24	Philadelphia Flyers	NHL	76	33	35	68	67	—	—	—	—	—
2024–25	Philadelphia Flyers	NHL	82	24	52	76	53	—	—	—	—	—
2025–26	Philadelphia Flyers	NHL	77	27	41	68	59	10	1	4	5	26
NHL totals			723	225	319	544	522	32	2	11	13	50

=== International ===
Year	Team	Event	Result	GP	G	A	Pts	PIM
2014	Canada Ontario	U17	5th	5	1	3	4	8
2014	Canada	IH18	1st place, gold medalist(s)	5	5	1	6	2
2014	Canada	U18	3rd place, bronze medalist(s)	7	4	1	5	2
2016	Canada	WJC	6th	5	1	1	2	0
2017	Canada	WC	2nd place, silver medalist(s)	10	0	8	8	4
2025	Canada	4NF	1st place, gold medalist(s)	2	0	0	0	0
2025	Canada	WC	5th	8	3	10	13	12
Junior totals				22	11	6	17	12
Senior totals				20	3	18	21	16

== Awards and honours ==
Awards and honours received by Travis Konecny
Award	Year	Ref.
OHL
Jack Ferguson Award	2013	
Emms Family Award	2014	
OHL First All-Rookie Team	2014	
NHL
E. J. McGuire Award of Excellence	2015	
NHL All-Star Game	2020, 2024	

Awards and achievements
Preceded by Connor McDavid	Jack Ferguson Award; 2013	Succeeded by Jakob Chychrun
Preceded by Connor McDavid	Winner of the Emms Family Award; 2014	Succeeded by Alex DeBrincat
Preceded by Ivan Provorov	Philadelphia Flyers' first-round draft pick 2015	Succeeded by German Rubtsov
