= Mikhail Smolin =

Russian historian (1971–2025)

Mikhail Borisovich Smolin (Russian: Миха́ил Бори́сович Смо́лин; 22 February 1971 – 23 July 2025) was a Russian historian.

== Life and career ==
Smolin was born in Leningrad on 22 February 1971. In 1996 he graduated from the Faculty of History of St. Petersburg State University.

He was the head of the Orthodox Center for Imperial Political Studies, the executive director of the Imperial Revival Foundation, as well as the editor-in-chief of the journals Imperial Revival, Orthodox Volga Region, Vestnik Yugo-Zapadnoi Rusi, and the editor-publisher of the book series Paths of Russian Imperial Consciousness, Orthodox Thought, and Imperial Tradition.

In 2024, Smolin was involved in a scandal, after he stated on a political talk show that "Uzbeks, Kazakhs and Azerbaijanis did not exist before 1917." This statement drew criticism from Uzbek society, and the Deputy Speaker of the Uzbek Parliament, Alisher Kadyrov, called for restrictions on the broadcasting of Russian channels.

Smolin died on 23 July 2025, at the age of 54.
