= Marsel Ibragimov =

Russian ice hockey player

- Born: 4 August 1997 (age 28); Novosibirsk, Russia
- Height: 6 ft 2 in (188 cm)
- Weight: 194 lb (88 kg; 13 st 12 lb)
- Position: Defence
- Shoots: Right
- KHL team Former teams: Avangard Omsk; CSKA Moscow; Traktor Chelyabinsk; Lada Togliatti
- NHL draft: Undrafted
- Playing career: 2017–present

Marsel Ibragimov (born 4 August 1997) is a Russian professional ice hockey player who is currently playing for Avangard Omsk in the Kontinental Hockey League (KHL). He played major junior hockey in the Western Hockey League for the Victoria Royals and Edmonton Oil Kings.

Following his seventh season in the KHL with HC CSKA Moscow in 2023–24, Ibragimov was traded by the club to Traktor Chelyabinsk in exchange for Yaroslav Yapparov on 18 May 2024.

On 5 June 2025, Ibragimov was included in a four player trade by Lada Togliatti to Avangard Omsk prior to the 2025–26 season.
