= Ivan Provorov =

Russian ice hockey player (born 1997)

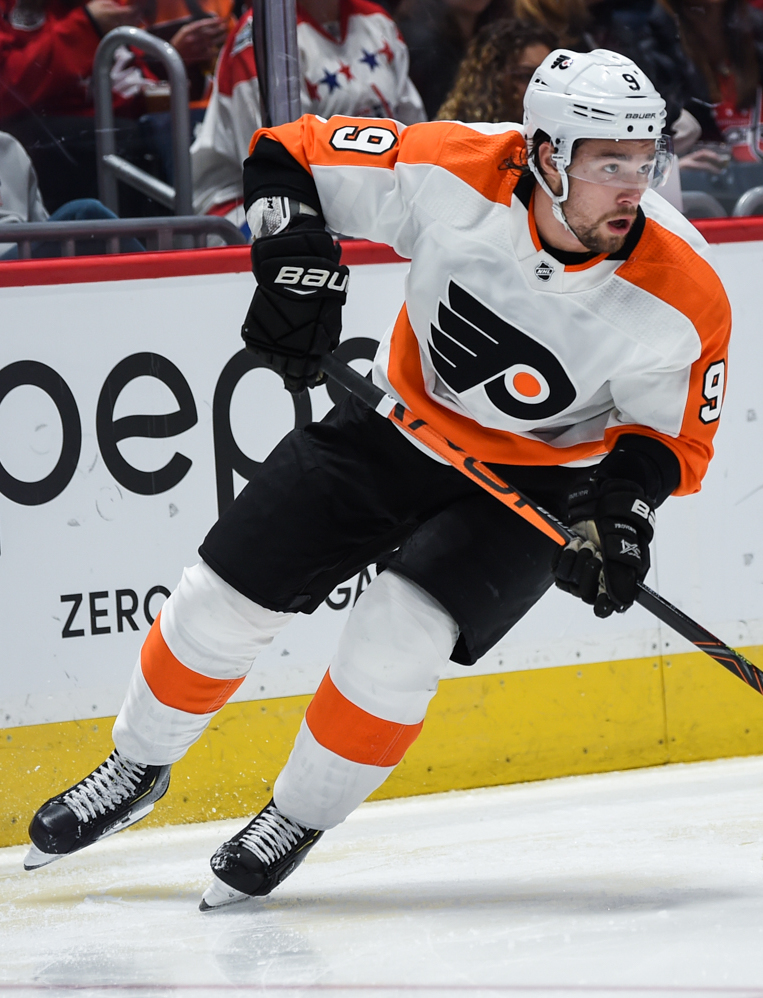
- Provorov with the Philadelphia Flyers in 2020
- Born: 13 January 1997 (age 29) Yaroslavl, Russia
- Height: 6 ft 1 in (185 cm)
- Weight: 224 lb (102 kg; 16 st 0 lb)
- Position: Defence
- Shoots: Left
- NHL team Former teams: Columbus Blue Jackets; Philadelphia Flyers
- National team: Russia
- NHL draft: 7th overall, 2015; Philadelphia Flyers
- Playing career: 2016–present

Ivan Vladimirovich Provorov (Russian: Иван Владимирович Проворов; born 13 January 1997) is a Russian professional ice hockey player who is a defenceman for the Columbus Blue Jackets of the National Hockey League (NHL). He previously played in the NHL for the Philadelphia Flyers.

Provorov was born in Yaroslavl, Russia, and played with the Yaroslavl Lokomotiv youth hockey team before moving to Wilkes-Barre, Pennsylvania at the age of 13 to play with the junior Wilkes-Barre/Scranton Knights. After two years with the Knights and one with the Cedar Rapids RoughRiders of the United States Hockey League, the Brandon Wheat Kings of the Western Hockey League selected Provorov 30th overall in the 2014 CHL Import Draft. In 2016, the WHL awarded Provorov the Bill Hunter Memorial Trophy, given annually to the best defenceman in the league. Internationally, Provorov has represented Russia at the IIHF World U18 Championship, the IIHF World U20 Championship, and the Ice Hockey World Championships.

The Flyers selected Provorov seventh overall in the 2015 NHL entry draft, and he signed an entry-level contract with the team that year. Provorov did not miss a game with the Flyers between 2016 and 2022, and holds the franchise's second-longest iron man streak for most consecutive games played, behind only Rod Brind'Amour. He is a four-time recipient of the Barry Ashbee Trophy for the best Flyers defenceman, and is the youngest recipient in franchise history.

== Early life ==
Provorov was born in Yaroslavl, Russia, on 13 January 1997, the oldest of three children of Venera and Vladimir Provorov. He learned to ice skate at the age of five, and grew up playing ice hockey with future Penn State skater Nikita Pavlychev, who said that Provorov "was definitely always standing out among the other kids even when we were growing up". After spending time with the Yaroslavl Lokomotiv youth hockey team, Provorov made the decision to move to North America, with the eventual goal of joining the National Hockey League (NHL).

Provorov moved to Wilkes-Barre, Pennsylvania in 2011, at the age of 13, to play for the junior Wilkes-Barre/Scranton Knights. He lived with a billet family, and learned English by attending private school and watching English-language films and television, such as Gladiator. Knights assistant coach Alex Vasko, who recruited Provorov, acted as the player's translator when he first arrived in the US. In his first season with the Knights, Provorov recorded 61 points in 27 games, and was part of the Tier I 14U national championship team that also included Pavlychev and Daniel Sprong. The next season, he was moved up to the Knights' midget hockey team, where he recorded 97 points in 51 games.

== Playing career ==
=== Amateur ===
Provorov was drafted at the age of 16 by the Cedar Rapids RoughRiders of the United States Hockey League (USHL) in the first round, fifth overall, of the 2013 USHL futures draft. He played 56 games with the RoughRiders in the 2013-14 season, scoring six goals and 13 assists. After his rookie season with the RoughRiders, Provorov was selected in two separate amateur drafts. The Brandon Wheat Kings of the Western Hockey League (WHL) – a subdivision of the Canadian Hockey League (CHL) – in the 2014 CHL Import Draft, while Yaroslavl Lokomotiv selected him 120th overall in the 2014 KHL Junior Draft. Originally, Provorov intended to spend two years with Cedar Rapids before playing college hockey for Penn State or Michigan, but he decided to sign with the Wheat Kings after a conversation with general manager and coach Kelly McCrimmon.

In January 2015, Provorov was invited to the CHL Top Prospects Game, where he played for Team Orr alongside future Philadelphia Flyer Travis Konecny. He ranked first among WHL rookies in scoring during the 2014–15 season, with 15 goals and 61 points in 60 games, and was a finalist for the CHL Top Draft Prospect Award. The following season, in 2015–16 Provorov was reassigned to the Wheat Kings, who won the Ed Chynoweth Cup but failed to win a single game in the 2016 Memorial Cup. He finished the 2015–16 season with 21 goals and 73 points in 62 games, and was named both the WHL Defenceman of the Year and the CHL Defenceman of the Year.

=== Professional ===
==== Philadelphia Flyers (2016–2023) ====
Going into the 2015 NHL entry draft, the NHL Central Scouting Bureau ranked Provorov seventh among all draft prospects. He was the second-highest rated defenceman, after Noah Hanifin. The Philadelphia Flyers selected Provorov seventh overall in the draft, and signed him to an entry-level contract shortly afterwards.

After a strong showing at training camp, Provorov was named to the Flyers' 2016–17 roster on 10 October 2016, where he was paired with veteran defenceman Mark Streit. He made his NHL debut on 14 October 2016, scoring his first point with an assist in the season opener against the Los Angeles Kings. He scored his first NHL goal the next month, in the second period of a 4–2 loss against the Tampa Bay Lightning on 23 November. Provorov finished his rookie season with 30 points (six goals and 24 assists) in 82 games with the Flyers. In April 2017, Provorov was awarded the Barry Ashbee Trophy, given to the Flyers' best defenceman. He was the third rookie to win the trophy, following Norm Barnes in 1980 and Shayne Gostisbehere in 2016, and was the youngest winner in Flyers history.

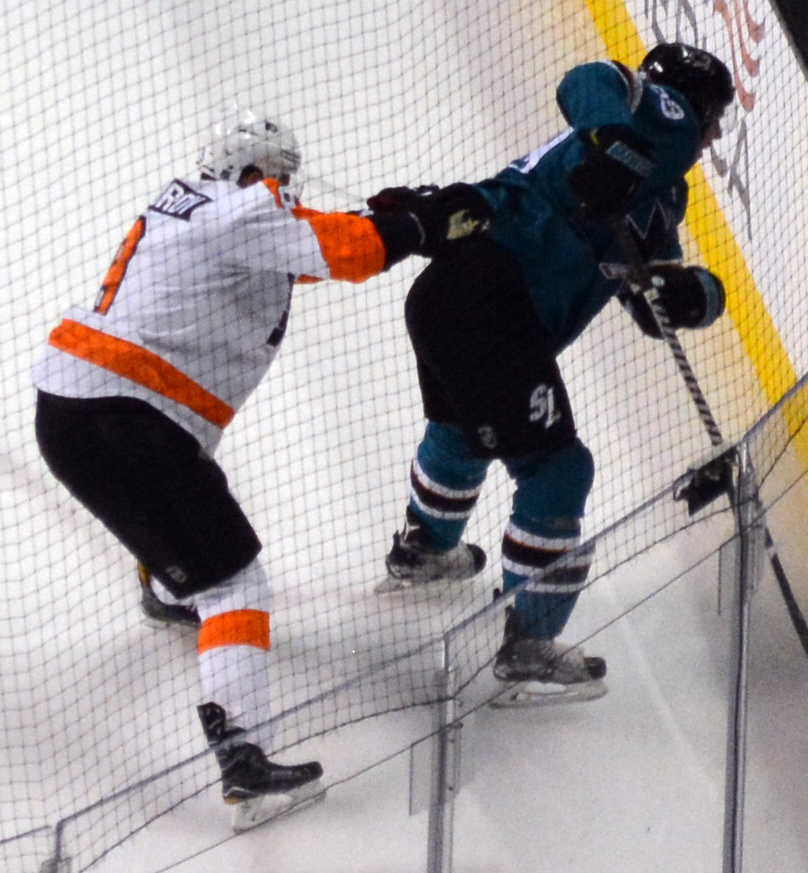
Provorov in a game against San Jose Sharks in 2016

Provorov began the 2017–18 season paired with Andrew MacDonald, but after the latter was placed on the injured reserve list with a lower body injury, Provorov was partnered with Robert Hägg and Shayne Gostisbehere. He improved upon his scoring from the previous year, recording 41 points (17 goals) in 82 games. That year, the Flyers made an appearance in the Stanley Cup playoffs, where they were eliminated in the first round by the Pittsburgh Penguins. Provorov revealed after the playoff series that he had suffered a separated shoulder prior to Game 6, and had been given painkillers so that he could play in the game. The injury would not require surgery, but required eight weeks to heal.

Provorov struggled at the start of the 2018–19 season, leading to speculation that he had not fully recovered from his shoulder injury. In December, Travis Sanheim replaced Gostisbehere as Provorov's partner, a decision which seemed to improve his performance. He had the highest time on ice of any Flyer that season, averaging over 25 minutes of play per game, and playing a total of 2,059 minutes. The Flyers' defence disappointed both offensively and defensively in the 2018–19 season: as a collective, the team allowed 280 goals against them, while no individual defenceman scored 10 or more goals. Most of the blame was placed on Provorov and Gostisbehere, the former of whom netted only seven goals and 26 points across the 82-game season.

On 12 September 2019, the Flyers re-signed Provorov to a six-year, $40.5 million contract extension. He entered the 2019–20 season on the top defensive pair with Matt Niskanen. When the NHL season was suspended on 12 March due to the COVID-19 pandemic, Provorov had amassed 13 goals and 36 points in all 69 regular season games. He continued practicing during the pause, skating at a private rink in Wilkes-Barre. When the NHL resumed for the 2020 Stanley Cup playoffs in Toronto, Provorov was one of 31 Flyers selected for the bubble. He scored the winning goal in the second overtime of Game 6 of the Eastern Conference semifinals, forcing a Game 7 against the New York Islanders. Provorov was again selected for the Barry Ashbee Trophy in 2020.

On 12 January 2021, the Flyers announced that Provorov would be designated alternate captain for all home games during the 2020–21 season. Niskanen's sudden off-season retirement left Provorov without a defensive partner, and coach Alain Vigneault altered the defensive pairings throughout the season in the hopes of finding a suitable top line. On 18 February 2021, Provorov surpassed Claude Giroux's 328-game iron man streak when the latter missed a game due to COVID-19 protocols. Provorov's still-ongoing streak is now the second-longest in Flyers history, behind Rod Brind'Amour's 484 consecutive starts from 1993 to 1999. The next week, on 24 February, Provorov set the NHL record of 331 consecutive games played by a defenceman from the start of a career for the same team, passing former Ranger Dan Girardi's record of 330. At the conclusion of the 2020–21 season, Provorov was awarded the Barry Ashbee Trophy for the third time in five seasons. He led the Flyers' defencemen with 26 points in all 55 games of the pandemic-shortened year.

After playing in 403 consecutive NHL games from the start of his career, Provorov was placed in enhanced COVID-19 protocols on 4 January 2022, forcing him to miss that night's game against the Anaheim Ducks and ending his iron man streak short of Brind'Amour's record. Following the 2021–22 season, Provorov was critical of the Philadelphia media when asked about his performance during a disappointing season.

In January 2023, Provorov became embroiled in a controversy when he boycotted pregame warmups which featured LGBT pride-themed equipment that was later auctioned off to support LGBT organizations. He cited his Russian Orthodox faith as an explanation for why he was against the initiative to promote the LGBT community, saying: "I respect everybody's choices. My choice is to stay true to myself and my religion. That's all I'm going to say".

==== Columbus Blue Jackets (2023–present) ====
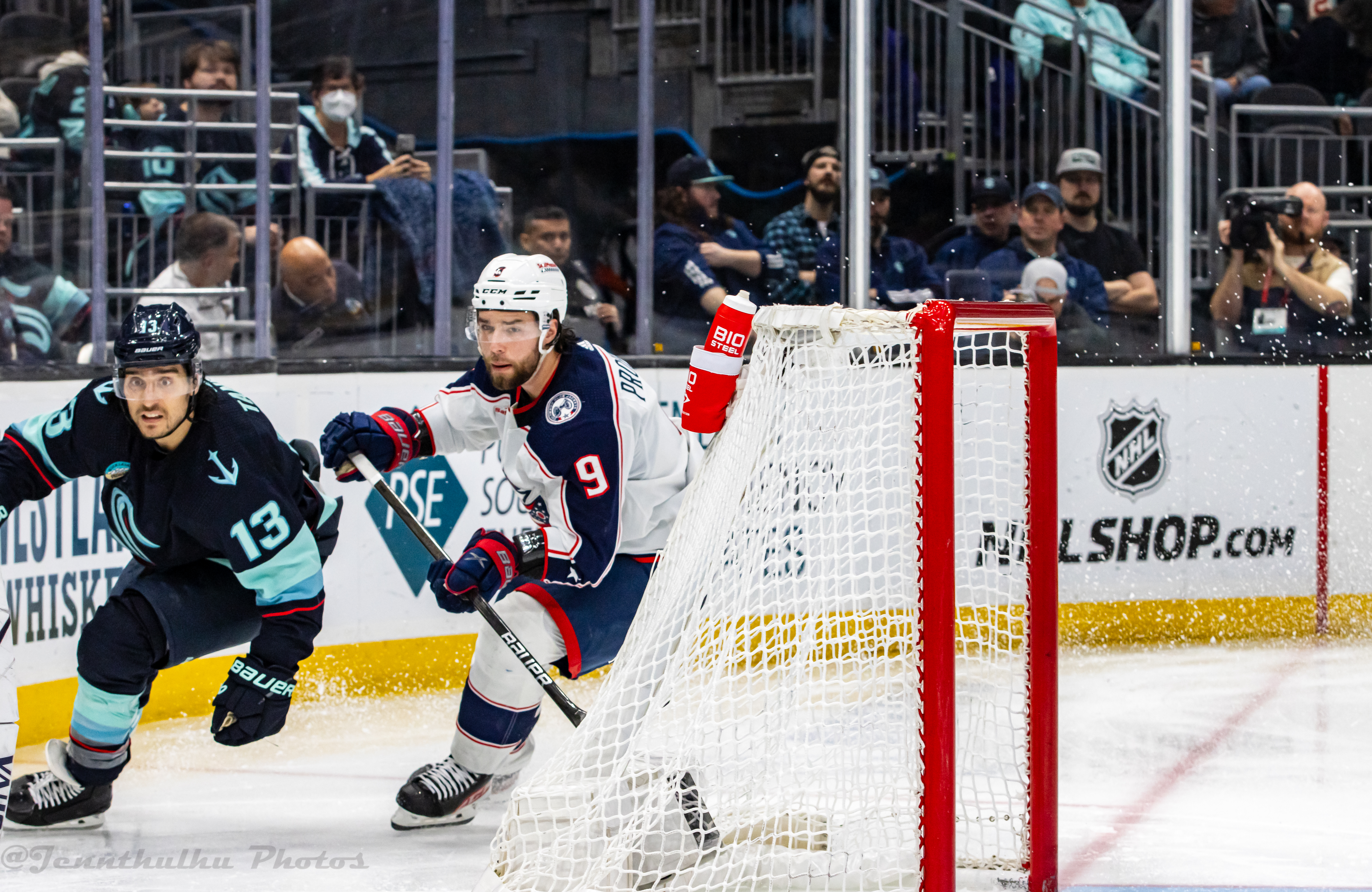
Provorov (right) and Brandon Tanev of the Seattle Kraken in a game in 2024

On 6 June 2023, the Flyers traded Provorov to the Columbus Blue Jackets in a three-team deal also involving the Los Angeles Kings, who retained 30 percent of Provorov's contract. On 1 July 2025, Provorov signed a seven-year, $59.5 million extension to remain in Columbus.

== Player profile ==
Scouting reports on Provorov have highlighted his skating ability and control. TSN Hockey declared him an "[e]xcellent, all-around defenseman with good upside", and praised his "excellent skating ability and a penchant for displaying tremendous mobility on the ice". Cory Pronman of ESPN said that he was "a smooth, quiet player who can flash high-end offensive moments too". Tony MacDonald, head of amateur scouting for the Carolina Hurricanes, praised Provorov's "great feel for the game, a great sense and a great understanding of how to play both with and without the puck".

Provorov is also known for his iron man streak. He currently holds the record for most consecutive games played for the same team from the start of a career, and is second to Rod Brind'Amour for longest consecutive game streak in Flyers history. From his debut, Provorov did not miss an NHL game until 4 January 2022, when he entered COVID-19 protocols several hours prior to a game against the Anaheim Ducks. Prior to that date, he had not missed a game of hockey since the age of 10, when he contracted chickenpox and stayed home so as not to infect his teammates. Provorov maintains a training regimen into the summer to maintain his conditioning, and credits his streak to his desire to play, telling The Philadelphia Inquirer, "I take pride in being out there every game and trying to help the team any way possible".

== International play ==
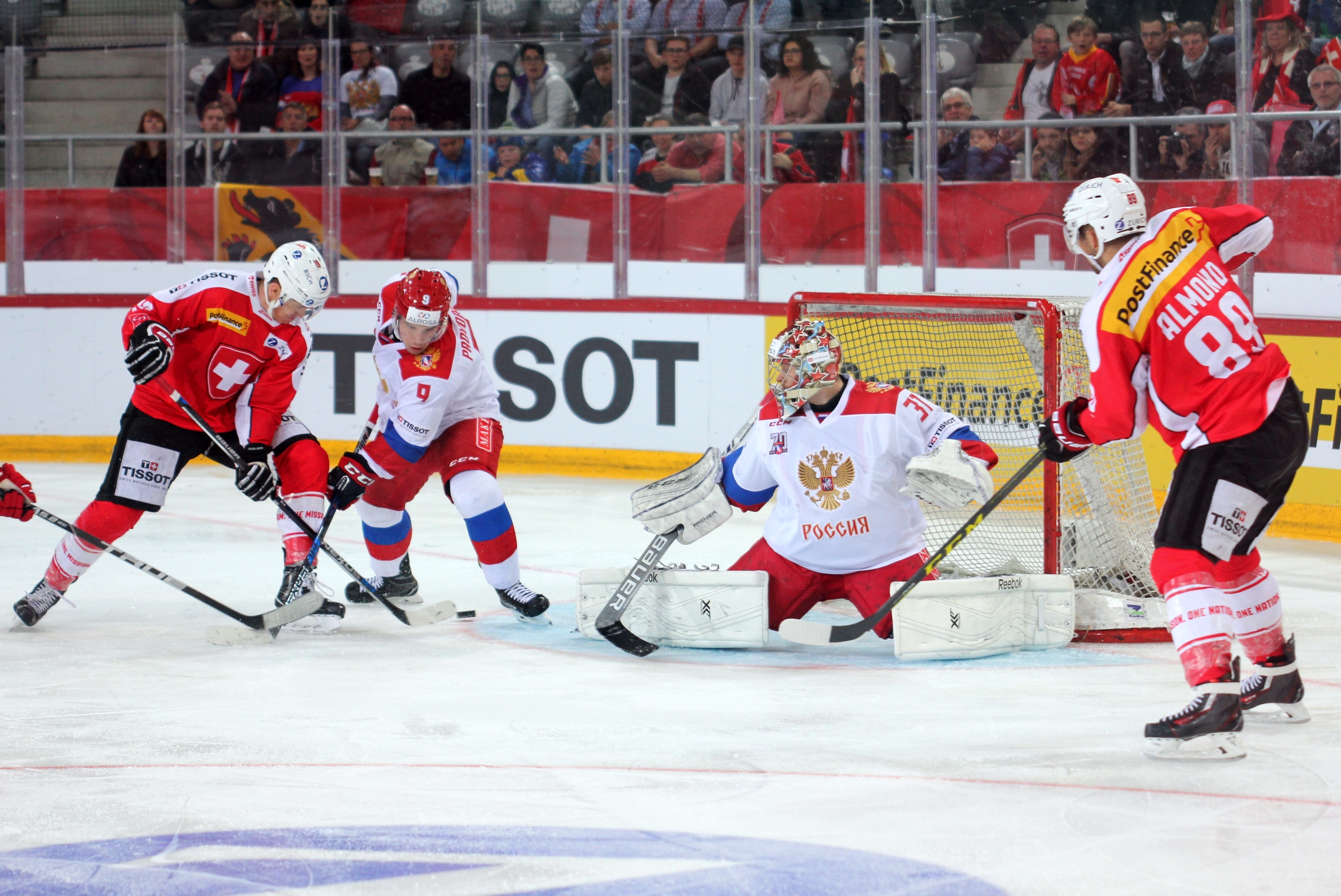
Provorov (second from left) with Russia at the 2017 World Championship

Medal record

Men's ice hockey

Representing Russia

World Championships
Bronze medal – third place	2017 Germany/France	

World Junior Championships
Silver medal – second place	2015 Canada	
Silver medal – second place	2016 Finland	

Provorov made his first international appearance at the 2014 World U18 Championships, playing for Russia. He next appeared for the Russia junior team at the 2015 World Junior Championships, recording an assist in the first game of the preliminary round against Denmark. Russia came away from the tournament with a silver medal, falling to Canada in the final.

Provorov returned to the Russian team at the 2016 World Junior Championships. His goal in the final minutes of the gold medal game against Finland tied the game 3–3 and forced the match into overtime. Finland scored shortly into the sudden death round, however, and Russia came away with a silver medal once more. Provorov next appeared at the 2017 World Championship, being of one of 10 Flyers' players appearing in the tournament. Russia senior team earned their fourth consecutive World Championship medal, taking the bronze against Finland.

Due to sanctions imposed on the Russian Athletics Federation following a high-profile doping scandal, Provorov and other Russian hockey players competed at the 2021 World Championship as the Russian Olympic Committee (ROC). Provorov's first point in the tournament came from an assist in the final moments of the group A opener against the Czech Republic. He picked up another assist in the same round against Switzerland, helping clinch a playoff berth for the ROC. The Russian team eventually fell to Canada in a quarterfinal overtime match, finishing fifth overall.

== Personal life ==
Provorov's pet Golden Retriever, "Drake the Pup Star", has a dedicated social media presence, with more than 1 million followers on Instagram and TikTok.

== Career statistics ==
=== Regular season and playoffs ===
			Regular season					Playoffs
Season	Team	League	GP	G	A	Pts	PIM	GP	G	A	Pts	PIM
2013–14	Cedar Rapids RoughRiders	USHL	56	6	13	19	32	—	—	—	—	—
2014–15	Brandon Wheat Kings	WHL	60	15	46	61	42	19	2	11	13	10
2015–16	Brandon Wheat Kings	WHL	62	21	52	73	16	21	3	10	13	14
2016–17	Philadelphia Flyers	NHL	82	6	24	30	34	—	—	—	—	—
2017–18	Philadelphia Flyers	NHL	82	17	24	41	20	6	0	3	3	0
2018–19	Philadelphia Flyers	NHL	82	7	19	26	32	—	—	—	—	—
2019–20	Philadelphia Flyers	NHL	69	13	23	36	24	16	3	5	8	4
2020–21	Philadelphia Flyers	NHL	56	7	19	26	28	—	—	—	—	—
2021–22	Philadelphia Flyers	NHL	79	9	22	31	34	—	—	—	—	—
2022–23	Philadelphia Flyers	NHL	82	6	21	27	24	—	—	—	—	—
2023–24	Columbus Blue Jackets	NHL	82	5	27	32	20	—	—	—	—	—
2024–25	Columbus Blue Jackets	NHL	82	7	26	33	31	—	—	—	—	—
2025–26	Columbus Blue Jackets	NHL	82	9	22	31	32	—	—	—	—	—
NHL totals			778	86	227	313	279	22	3	8	11	4

=== International ===
Year	Team	Event	Result	GP	G	A	Pts	PIM
2014	Russia	WJC18	5th	5	0	0	0	0
2015	Russia	WJC	2nd place, silver medalist(s)	7	0	1	1	0
2016	Russia	WJC	2nd place, silver medalist(s)	7	0	8	8	2
2017	Russia	WC	3rd place, bronze medalist(s)	10	0	3	3	6
2021	ROC	WC	5th	8	0	2	2	0
Junior totals				19	0	9	9	2
Senior totals				18	0	5	5	6

== Awards and honors ==
Award	Year	Ref
WHL
Ed Chynoweth Cup champion	2015–16	
Bill Hunter Memorial Trophy	2015–16	
Philadelphia Flyers
Barry Ashbee Trophy	2016–17, 2019–20, 2020–21, 2022-23	

Awards and achievements
Preceded by Travis Sanheim	Philadelphia Flyers first-round draft pick 2015	Succeeded by Travis Konecny
