= Travis Sanheim =

Canadian ice hockey player (born 1996)

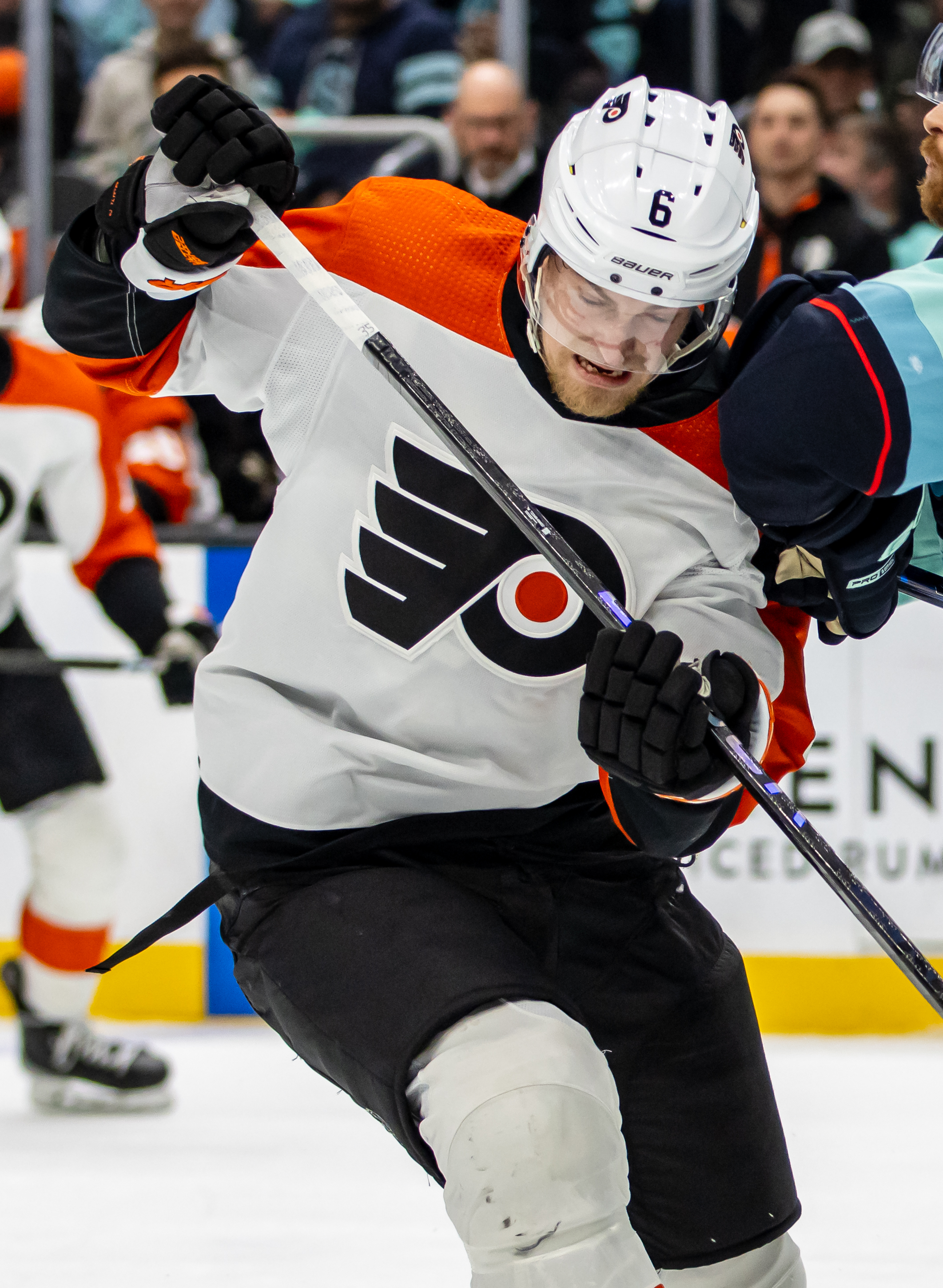
- Sanheim with the Philadelphia Flyers in 2023
- Born: March 29, 1996 (age 30) Elkhorn, Manitoba, Canada
- Height: 6 ft 4 in (193 cm)
- Weight: 222 lb (101 kg; 15 st 12 lb)
- Position: Defence
- Shoots: Left
- NHL team: Philadelphia Flyers
- National team: Canada
- NHL draft: 17th overall, 2014; Philadelphia Flyers
- Playing career: 2016–present

Travis Sanheim (born March 29, 1996) is a Canadian professional ice hockey player who is a defenceman and alternate captain for the Philadelphia Flyers of the National Hockey League (NHL). Sanheim was selected by the Flyers in the first round, 17th overall, of the 2014 NHL entry draft.

== Early life ==
Both Travis and his fraternal twin brother Taylor Sanheim were born on March 29, 1996, to Kent and Shelley Sanheim. The Sanheim family ran a farm in Elkhorn, Manitoba, where Travis and Taylor were born, raised, and worked through their childhoods and adolescence. Both brothers began playing minor ice hockey with the Yellowhead Chiefs in the Manitoba U-18 'AAA' Hockey League: while Taylor was on the wing, Travis would play defence. Although he eventually grew to be 6 feet 3 inches (1.91 m), Sanheim was often smaller than many of his minor hockey opponents, and in response, he learned how to skate and think faster to counterbalance his smaller size.

== Playing career ==
=== Junior ===
The Calgary Hitmen of the Western Hockey League (WHL) selected Sanheim in the ninth round, 177th overall, of the 2011 WHL Bantam Draft. He debuted with the team for the 2013–14 season and had a difficult adjustment period, coupled by a late growth spurt, that limited Sanheim to only three points through his first 21 games of the season. He found his footing when paired defensively with Ben Thomas and received more playing time beginning in December after an injury to captain Jaynen Rissling. By the end of his rookie season, Sanheim had 29 points and a +25 plus–minus through 67 junior ice hockey games. That summer, the Philadelphia Flyers of the National Hockey League (NHL) selected Sanheim in the first round, 17th overall, of the 2014 NHL entry draft.

Sanheim attended both the Flyers' rookie and general training camps in 2014, and appeared in one preseason game, before returning to Calgary for the 2014–15 WHL season. He also signed an entry-level contract with Philadelphia just before the WHL and NHL seasons began. His sophomore season in the WHL proved to be a breakout, with 15 goals and 65 points in 67 games. Although he led all defencemen with 39 points through the first 41 games of the season, Sanheim found additional success starting in January when he was paired with Jake Bean, another offensively-minded defenceman. Through the remainder of their respective junior hockey careers, Sanheim and Bean served as primary scorers, as well as penalty killers, for a team that often lacked elite forwards. In the postseason, Sanheim scored the game-winning, double-overtime goal for the Hitmen to advance them past the Medicine Hat Tigers and into the Eastern Conference Finals for the Ed Chynoweth Cup. The Brandon Wheat Kings ultimately defeated the Hitmen in five games of the conference finals.

With a number of the Hitmen's playoff core leaving the team for the NHL just before the 2015–16 season, Sanheim, who was returned to the team after another training camp with Philadelphia, became a veteran presence for Calgary. He led all WHL defencemen in scoring with 22 points through the first 18 games of the season before suffering an upper-body injury in a game against the Prince Albert Raiders at the start of November. He missed nearly the entire month, returning on November 30 with a goal and an assist in a 4–3 overtime loss to the Regina Pats. Sanheim missed another stretch of games at the turn of the calendar year, during which time he was representing Canada at the 2016 World Junior Ice Hockey Championships. In his absence, Calgary appointed his twin brother Taylor as a temporary alternate captain. Despite missing a total of 15 regular season games, Sanheim finished his final season of junior hockey with 15 goals and 68 points, and he led all Canadian Hockey League (CHL) defencemen in points per game. Sanheim's junior hockey career ended when the Red Deer Rebels swept the Hitmen in the first round of 2016 WHL playoffs.

=== Professional ===
After the Hitmen's season ended, Sanheim joined the Flyers' American Hockey League (AHL) affiliate, the Lehigh Valley Phantoms, for the final stretch of their 2015–16 season. He appeared in four games for the Phantoms, recording three points in the process. Sanheim returned to the Phantoms for the 2016–17 AHL season, where he and his defensive partner Samuel Morin worked with assistant coach Kerry Huffman in order to heighten the physical aspect of their game for an older, larger group of skaters. While Sanheim's offensive abilities were already strong from his junior career, his work with Huffman helped Sanheim to develop his overall game. He did not score a goal until December, but through 63 games, Sanheim had both scored 10 goals and 29 points and he carried a +7 plus-minus. He finished the year with 10 goals and 37 points in 76 AHL games. All but one of these goals were at full strength, as T. J. Brennan was the Phantoms' main power play defenceman.

Sanheim made Philadelphia's final roster out of training camp and started the 2017–18 season in the NHL. He scored his first NHL goal on December 14, 2017, in his 28th NHL game, to help the Flyers defeat the Buffalo Sabres 2–1. He was reassigned to Philadelphia's American Hockey League (AHL) affiliate, the Lehigh Valley Phantoms, on January 22, 2018, but was later recalled on March 9 due to an injury to Robert Hägg. Sanheim made his Stanley Cup playoff debut during the first round of the 2018 playoffs against the Pittsburgh Penguins. He recorded his first career playoff goal on April 15 in a 5–1 loss to the Penguins. The Flyers ended up losing to the Penguins in six games, after which Sanheim was loaned to the Phantoms to help them with their run in the 2018 Calder Cup playoffs.

On June 24, 2019, Sanheim signed a new two-year, $6.5 million contract.

Sanheim and his defensive mate Philippe Myers were two of the young Flyers to struggle in the protracted 2020–21 season, during which Philadelphia went 25-23-8. The loss of veteran presence in Matt Niskanen particularly affected many of the team's young defenders, as Alain Vigneault struggled to find a stable top pairing for Ivan Provorov. Sanheim was also the first Flyer to test positive for the COVID-19 virus during a team outbreak that February. Although he did not experience any significant symptoms, he was forced to isolate from February 7 to 18. The 2020–21 season proved to be the worst of Sanheim's career thus far, as he dropped to only three goals, 15 points, and a –22 rating while skating in all but one of the 56 games in the shortened season. Although statistically Sanheim's defensive performance was similar to seasons prior, his mistakes tended to be costlier during the 2020–21 season, with his turnovers and positioning leading more often to goals against than they had earlier in his NHL career.

Sanheim, a restricted free agent going into the 2021–22 season, successfully avoided contract arbitration on August 21, when he signed a two-year contract extension that carried an average annual value of $4.675 million. As Myers had been traded to the Nashville Predators over the summer, Sanheim's new partner on the second defensive line was Rasmus Ristolainen, who the Flyers had received in a trade with the Buffalo Sabres.

On October 13, 2022, Sanheim signed an 8-year, $50 million extension that would keep him in Philadelphia through 2031.

== International play ==
Medal record

Representing Canada

Ice hockey

Olympic Games
Silver medal – second place	2026 Milano Cortina	

World Championship
Silver medal – second place	2022 Finland	

4 Nations Face-Off
Winner	2025 Canada/United States	

World U18 Championship
Bronze medal – third place	2015 Finland	

Sanheim was chosen to compete with the Canada Western squad at the 2013 World U-17 Hockey Challenge, and he led Canada to capture the bronze medal at the 2014 IIHF World U18 Championships (WJC-18). At the WJC-18, Sanheim led all defencemen with six points, and was named one of Canada's top three players in the tournament, also earning recognition as the tournament's best defenceman.

On December 31, 2025, he was named to Canada's roster to compete at the 2026 Winter Olympics.

== Career statistics ==
=== Regular season and playoffs ===
			Regular season					Playoffs
Season	Team	League	GP	G	A	Pts	PIM	GP	G	A	Pts	PIM
2012–13	Winkler Flyers	MJHL	—	—	—	—	—	6	0	1	1	2
2013–14	Calgary Hitmen	WHL	67	5	24	29	14	6	1	1	2	6
2014–15	Calgary Hitmen	WHL	67	15	50	65	52	17	5	13	18	10
2015–16	Calgary Hitmen	WHL	52	15	53	68	66	5	1	5	6	8
2015–16	Lehigh Valley Phantoms	AHL	4	1	2	3	0	—	—	—	—	—
2016–17	Lehigh Valley Phantoms	AHL	76	10	27	37	46	5	0	3	3	2
2017–18	Philadelphia Flyers	NHL	49	2	8	10	20	4	1	0	1	2
2017–18	Lehigh Valley Phantoms	AHL	18	1	15	16	10	7	1	2	3	4
2018–19	Philadelphia Flyers	NHL	82	9	26	35	22	—	—	—	—	—
2019–20	Philadelphia Flyers	NHL	69	8	17	25	32	16	1	6	7	6
2020–21	Philadelphia Flyers	NHL	55	3	12	15	23	—	—	—	—	—
2021–22	Philadelphia Flyers	NHL	80	7	24	31	34	—	—	—	—	—
2022–23	Philadelphia Flyers	NHL	81	7	16	23	40	—	—	—	—	—
2023–24	Philadelphia Flyers	NHL	81	10	34	44	48	—	—	—	—	—
2024–25	Philadelphia Flyers	NHL	82	8	22	30	40	—	—	—	—	—
2025–26	Philadelphia Flyers	NHL	81	11	26	37	20	10	2	1	3	6
NHL totals			660	65	185	250	279	30	4	7	11	14

=== International ===
Year	Team	Event	Result	GP	G	A	Pts	PIM
2013	Canada Western	U17	9th	5	0	1	1	2
2014	Canada	U18	3rd place, bronze medalist(s)	7	0	6	6	0
2016	Canada	WJC	6th	5	0	1	1	0
2022	Canada	WC	2nd place, silver medalist(s)	10	1	3	4	0
2025	Canada	4NF	1st place, gold medalist(s)	3	0	1	1	0
2025	Canada	WC	5th	8	2	1	3	0
2026	Canada	OG	2nd place, silver medalist(s)	5	0	1	1	2
Junior totals				17	0	8	8	2
Senior totals				26	3	6	9	2

== Awards and honours ==
Honours	Year
IIHF World U18 Championship best defenceman	2014

Awards and achievements
Preceded by Samuel Morin	Philadelphia Flyers first-round draft pick 2014	Succeeded by Ivan Provorov
