= 2015 NHL entry draft =

2015 North American ice hockey draft

General information
- Date: June 26–27, 2015
- Location: BB&T Center; Sunrise, Florida, U.S.
- Networks: Sportsnet (Canada); NBCSN (United States)

Overview
- 211 total selections in 7 rounds
- First selection: (Canada) Connor McDavid (Edmonton Oilers)

The 2015 NHL entry draft was the 53rd draft for the National Hockey League. It was held on June 26–27, 2015, at the BB&T Center in Sunrise, Florida. The first three selections were Connor McDavid by the Edmonton Oilers, Jack Eichel by the Buffalo Sabres, and Dylan Strome by the Arizona Coyotes.

As of 2026, there are 66 active NHL players from this draft. That year, this draft was compared alongside the 2003 draft by The Athletic as one of the deepest in modern NHL history.

== Eligibility ==
Players born between January 1, 1995, and September 15, 1997, were eligible for selection in the 2015 NHL entry draft. Additionally, undrafted, non-North American players born in 1994 were eligible for the draft, and those players who were drafted in the 2013 NHL entry draft, but not signed by an NHL team and who were born after June 30, 1995, were also eligible to re-enter the Draft.

== Draft lottery ==
Since the 2012–13 season, all 14 teams not qualifying for the Stanley Cup playoffs have a "weighted" chance at winning the first overall selection. Beginning with the 2014–15 season, the NHL changed the weighting system that was used in previous years. Under the new system, the odds of winning the draft lottery for the four lowest finishing teams in the League decreased, while the odds for the other non-playoff teams increased. The Edmonton Oilers won the 2015 draft lottery that took place on April 18, 2015, thus moving them from the third overall pick to the first overall pick.

== Top prospects ==
Source: NHL Central Scouting final (April 8, 2015) ranking.

Ranking	North American skaters	European skaters
1	(Canada) Connor McDavid (C)	(Finland) Mikko Rantanen (RW)
2	(United States) Jack Eichel (C)	(Sweden) Gabriel Carlsson (D)
3	(United States) Noah Hanifin (D)	(Sweden) Jacob Larsson (D)
4	(Canada) Dylan Strome (C)	(Sweden) Joel Eriksson Ek (C)
5	(Canada) Lawson Crouse (LW)	(Czech Republic) Michael Spacek (RW)
6	(Canada) Mitch Marner (C/RW)	(Sweden) Oliver Kylington (D)
7	(Russia) Ivan Provorov (D)	(Russia) Denis Gurianov (RW)
8	(Czech Republic) Pavel Zacha (C)	(Sweden) Robin Kovacs (RW)
9	(United States) Zach Werenski (D)	(Sweden) Filip Ahl (LW)
10	(Switzerland) Timo Meier (RW)	(Sweden) Jens Looke (RW)

Ranking	North American goalies	European goalies
1	(Canada) Mackenzie Blackwood	(Russia) Ilya Samsonov
2	(Canada) Callum Booth	(Czech Republic) Daniel Vladar
3	(Canada) Samuel Montembeault	(Sweden) Felix Sandstrom

== Selections by round ==
The order of the 2015 entry draft is listed below.

= NHL All-Star team ·	= NHL All-Star (Note: Players are identified as an All-Star if they were selected for the All-Star game at any time in their career.) ·	= NHL All-Star and NHL All-Star team ·

=== Round one ===
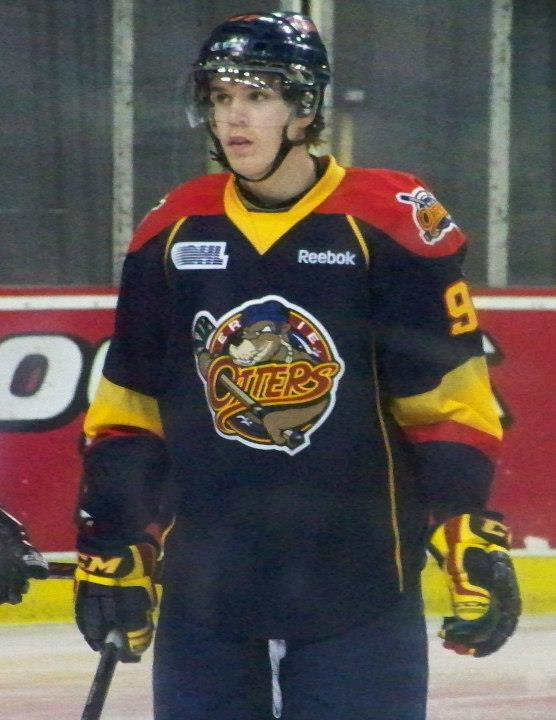
Connor McDavid was selected first overall by the Edmonton Oilers.

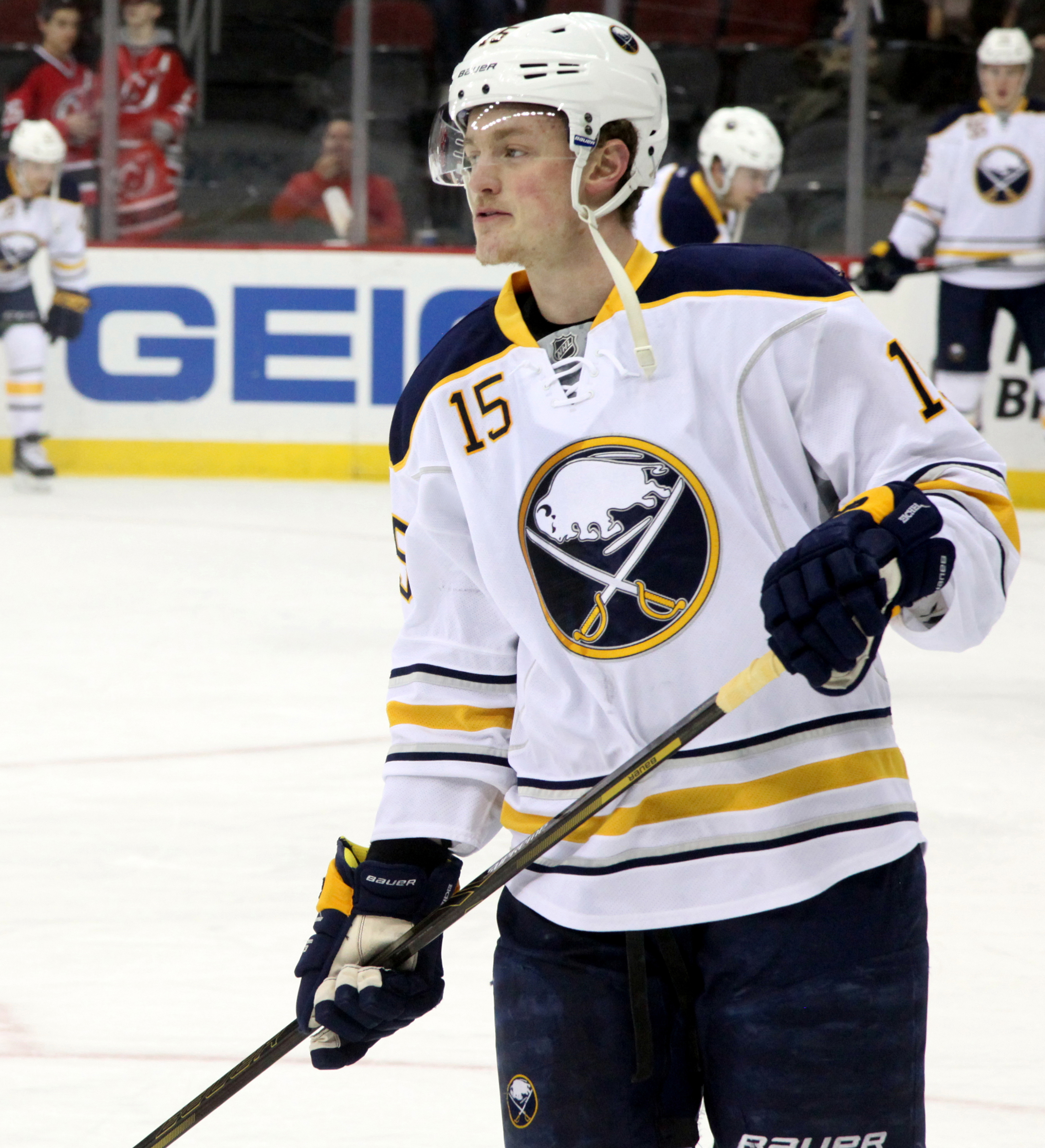
Jack Eichel was selected second overall by the Buffalo Sabres.

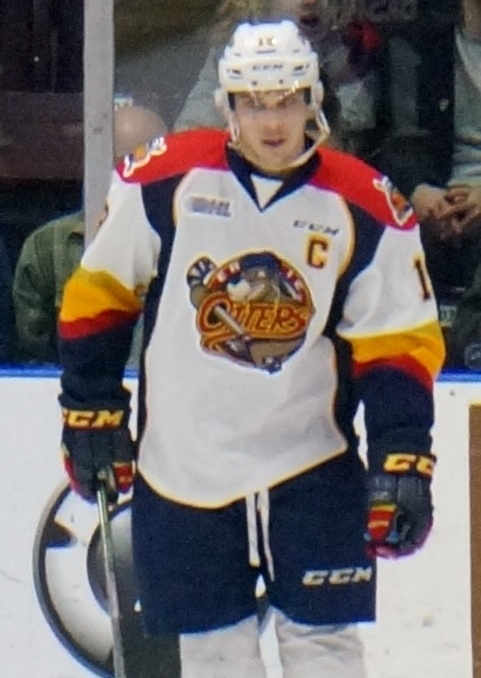
Dylan Strome was selected third overall by the Arizona Coyotes.

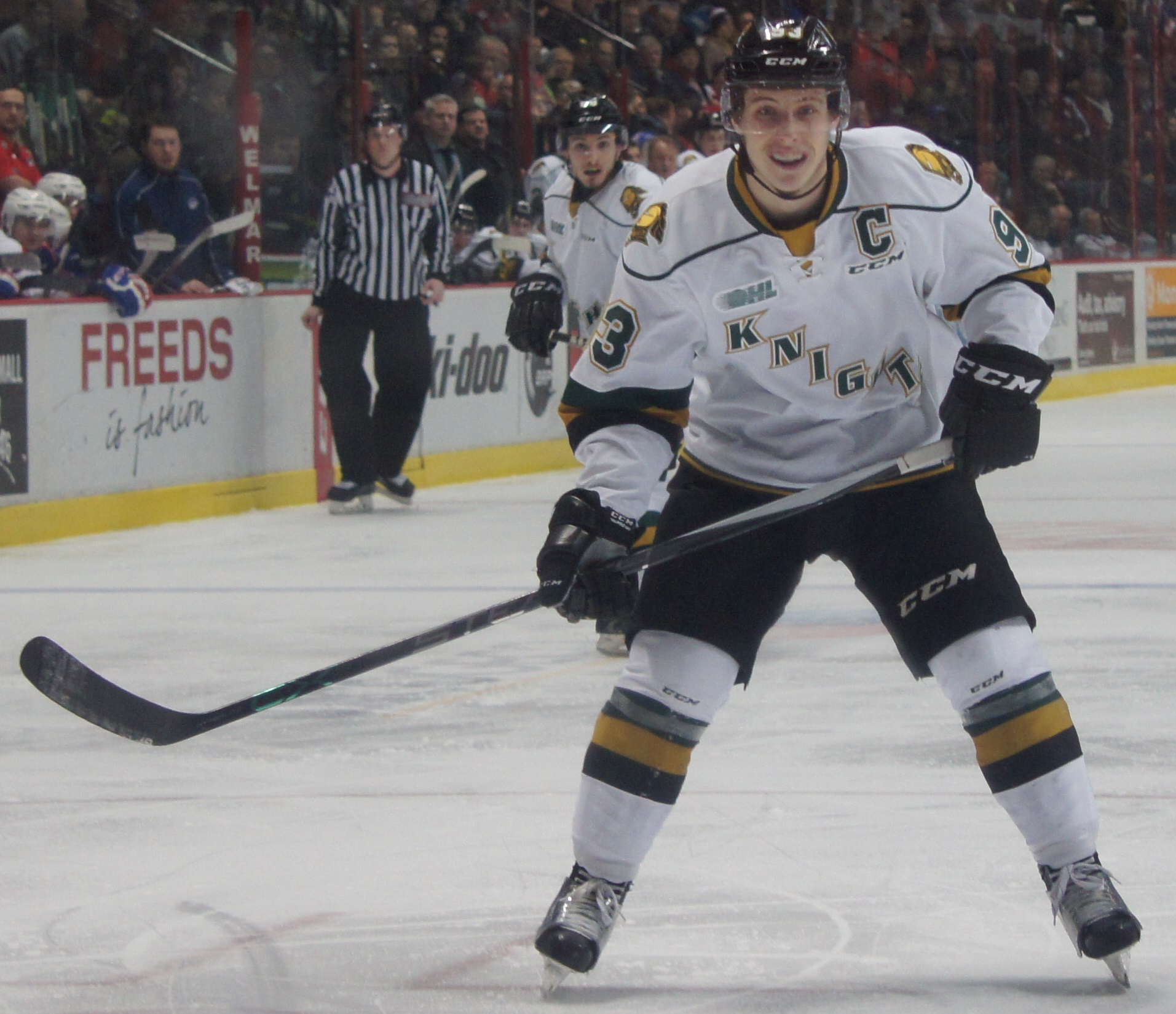
Mitch Marner was selected fourth overall by the Toronto Maple Leafs.

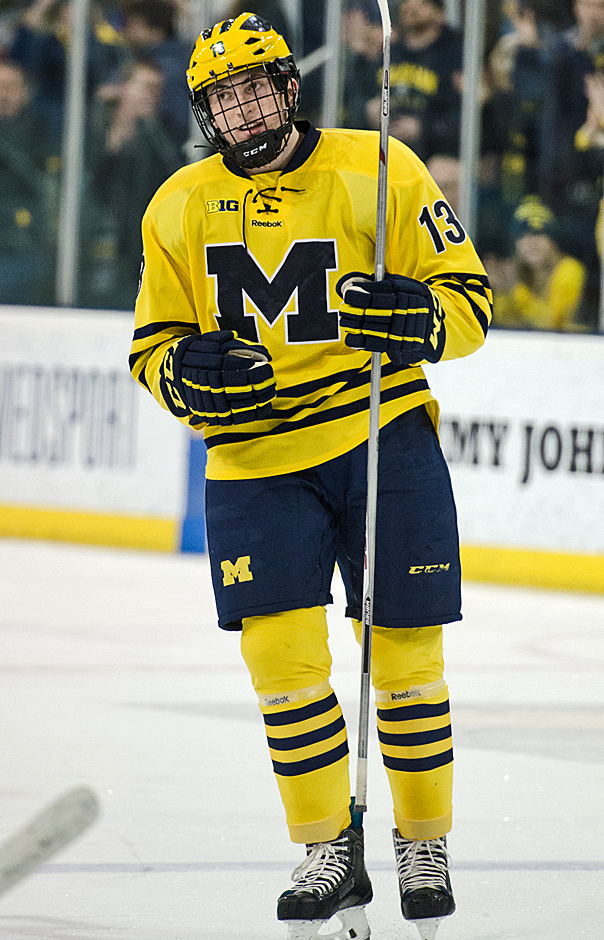
Zach Werenski was selected eighth overall by the Columbus Blue Jackets.

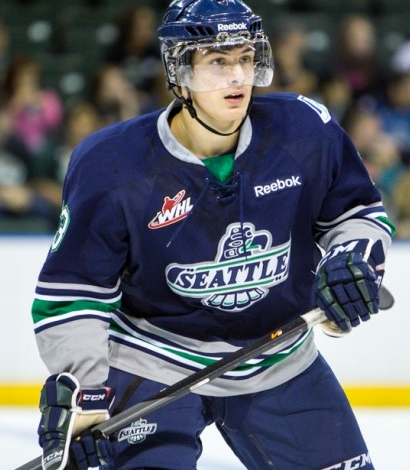
Mathew Barzal was selected sixteenth overall by the New York Islanders.

#	Player	Nationality	NHL team	College/junior/club team
1	Connor McDavid (C)	Canada	Edmonton Oilers	Erie Otters (OHL)
2	Jack Eichel (C)	United States	Buffalo Sabres	Boston University Terriers (Hockey East)
3	Dylan Strome (C)	Canada	Arizona Coyotes	Erie Otters (OHL)
4	Mitch Marner (C/RW)	Canada	Toronto Maple Leafs	London Knights (OHL)
5	Noah Hanifin (D)	United States	Carolina Hurricanes	Boston College Eagles (Hockey East)
6	Pavel Zacha (C)	Czech Republic	New Jersey Devils	Sarnia Sting (OHL)
7	Ivan Provorov (D)	Russia	Philadelphia Flyers	Brandon Wheat Kings (WHL)
8	Zach Werenski (D)	United States	Columbus Blue Jackets	Michigan Wolverines (Big Ten)
9	Timo Meier (RW)	Switzerland	San Jose Sharks	Halifax Mooseheads (QMJHL)
10	Mikko Rantanen (RW)	Finland	Colorado Avalanche	TPS (Liiga)
11	Lawson Crouse (LW)	Canada	Florida Panthers	Kingston Frontenacs (OHL)
12	Denis Gurianov (RW)	Russia	Dallas Stars	Lada Togliatti (KHL)
13	Jakub Zboril (D)	Czech Republic	Boston Bruins (from Los Angeles)^{1}	Saint John Sea Dogs (QMJHL)
14	Jake DeBrusk (LW)	Canada	Boston Bruins	Swift Current Broncos (WHL)
15	Zachary Senyshyn (RW)	Canada	Boston Bruins (from Calgary)^{2}	Sault Ste. Marie Greyhounds (OHL)
16	Mathew Barzal (C)	Canada	New York Islanders (from Pittsburgh via Edmonton)^{3}	Seattle Thunderbirds (WHL)
17	Kyle Connor (LW)	United States	Winnipeg Jets	Youngstown Phantoms (USHL)
18	Thomas Chabot (D)	Canada	Ottawa Senators	Saint John Sea Dogs (QMJHL)
19	Evgeny Svechnikov (LW)	Russia	Detroit Red Wings	Cape Breton Screaming Eagles (QMJHL)
20	Joel Eriksson Ek (C)	Sweden	Minnesota Wild	Farjestad BK (SHL)
21	Colin White (C)	United States	Ottawa Senators (from NY Islanders via Buffalo)^{4}	U.S. NTDP (USHL)
22	Ilya Samsonov (G)	Russia	Washington Capitals	Metallurg Magnitogorsk (KHL)
23	Brock Boeser (RW)	United States	Vancouver Canucks	Waterloo Black Hawks (USHL)
24	Travis Konecny (C)	Canada	Philadelphia Flyers (from Nashville via Toronto)^{5}	Ottawa 67's (OHL)
25	Jack Roslovic (C)	United States	Winnipeg Jets (from St. Louis via Buffalo)^{6}	U.S. NTDP (USHL)
26	Noah Juulsen (D)	Canada	Montreal Canadiens	Everett Silvertips (WHL)
27	Jacob Larsson (D)	Sweden	Anaheim Ducks	Frolunda HC (SHL)
28	Anthony Beauvillier (LW)	Canada	New York Islanders (from NY Rangers via Tampa Bay)^{7}	Shawinigan Cataractes (QMJHL)
29	Gabriel Carlsson (D)	Sweden	Columbus Blue Jackets (from Tampa Bay via Philadelphia and Toronto)^{8}	Linkopings HC (SHL)
30	Nick Merkley (RW)	Canada	Arizona Coyotes (from Chicago)^{9}	Kelowna Rockets (WHL)

Notes

1. The Los Angeles Kings' first round pick went to the Boston Bruins as the result of a trade on June 26, 2015, that sent Milan Lucic to Los Angeles in exchange for Martin Jones, Colin Miller and this pick.
2. The Calgary Flames' first-round pick went to the Boston Bruins as the result of a trade on June 26, 2015, that sent Dougie Hamilton to Calgary in exchange for Calgary and Washington's second-round picks in 2015 (45th and 52nd overall) and this pick.
3. The Pittsburgh Penguins' first-round pick went to the New York Islanders as the result of a trade on June 26, 2015, that sent Griffin Reinhart to Edmonton in exchange for a second-round pick in 2015 (33rd overall) and this pick.
  Edmonton previously acquired this pick as the result of a trade on January 2, 2015, that sent David Perron to Pittsburgh in exchange for Rob Klinkhammer and this pick.
4. The New York Islanders' first-round pick went to the Ottawa Senators as the result of a trade on June 26, 2015, that sent Robin Lehner and David Legwand to Buffalo in exchange for this pick.
  Buffalo previously acquired this pick as the result of a trade on October 27, 2013, that sent Thomas Vanek to New York in exchange for Matt Moulson, a second-round pick in 2015 and this pick (being conditional at the time of the trade). The condition – Buffalo will receive a first-round pick in 2014 or 2015 at New York's choice – was converted on May 22, 2014, when the Islanders elected to keep their 2014 first-round pick.
5. The Nashville Predators' first-round pick went to the Philadelphia Flyers as the result of a trade on June 26, 2015, that sent Tampa Bay's first-round pick in 2015 (29th overall) and Chicago's second-round pick in 2015 (61st overall) to Toronto in exchange for this pick.
  Toronto previously acquired this pick as the result of a trade on February 15, 2015, that sent Cody Franson and Mike Santorelli to Nashville in exchange for Olli Jokinen, Brendan Leipsic and this pick.
6. The St. Louis Blues' first-round pick went to the Winnipeg Jets as the result of a trade on February 11, 2015, that sent Evander Kane, Zach Bogosian and Jason Kasdorf to Buffalo in exchange for Tyler Myers, Drew Stafford, Joel Armia, Brendan Lemieux and this pick (being conditional at the time of the trade). The condition – Winnipeg will receive the lowest of Buffalo's first-round picks in 2015 – was converted on April 27, 2015, when the Islanders were eliminated from the 2015 Stanley Cup playoffs, ensuring that the Blues' first-round pick would be lower.
  Buffalo previously acquired this pick as the result of a trade on February 28, 2014, that sent Ryan Miller, Steve Ott and conditional second and third-round picks in 2014 to St. Louis in exchange for Jaroslav Halak, Chris Stewart, William Carrier, a conditional first-round pick in 2014 and this pick.
7. The New York Rangers' first-round pick went to the New York Islanders as the result of a trade on June 26, 2015, that sent Edmonton's second-round pick in 2015 (33rd overall) and Florida's third-round pick in 2015 (72nd overall) to Tampa Bay in exchange for this pick.
  Tampa Bay previously acquired this pick as the result of trade on March 5, 2014, that sent Martin St. Louis and a conditional second-round pick in 2015 to New York in exchange for Ryan Callahan, a conditional first-round pick in 2014, a conditional seventh-round pick in 2015 and this pick.
8. The Tampa Bay Lightning's first-round pick went to the Columbus Blue Jackets as the result of a trade on June 26, 2015, that sent Toronto's second-round pick in 2015 (34th overall) and Philadelphia's third-round pick in 2015 (68th overall) to Toronto in exchange for this pick.
  Toronto previously acquired this pick as the result of a trade on June 26, 2015, that sent Nashville's first-round pick in 2015 (24th overall) to Philadelphia in exchange for Chicago's second-round pick in 2015 (61st overall) and this pick.
  Philadelphia previously acquired this pick as the result of a trade on March 2, 2015, that sent Braydon Coburn to Tampa Bay in exchange for Radko Gudas, a third-round pick in 2015 and this pick (being conditional at the time of the trade). The condition – Philadelphia will receive the Lightning's first-round draft pick in 2015 if it is not the first overall selection – was converted on March 30, 2015, when Tampa Bay qualified for the 2015 Stanley Cup playoffs ensuring that this pick could not be a lottery selection.
9. The Chicago Blackhawks' first-round pick went the Arizona Coyotes as the result of a trade on February 28, 2015, that sent Antoine Vermette to Chicago in exchange for Klas Dahlbeck and this pick.

=== Round two ===
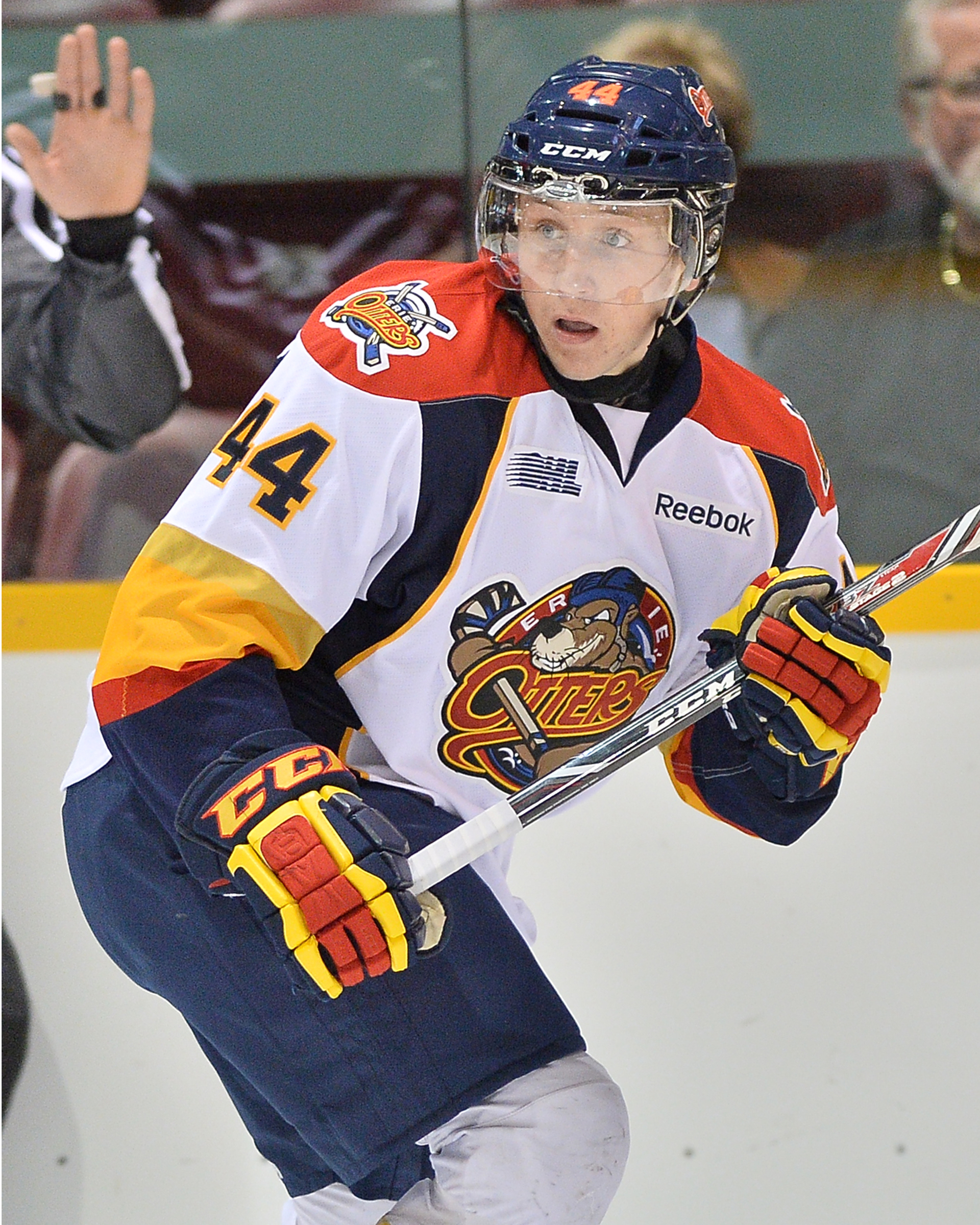
Travis Dermott was selected 34th overall by the Toronto Maple Leafs.

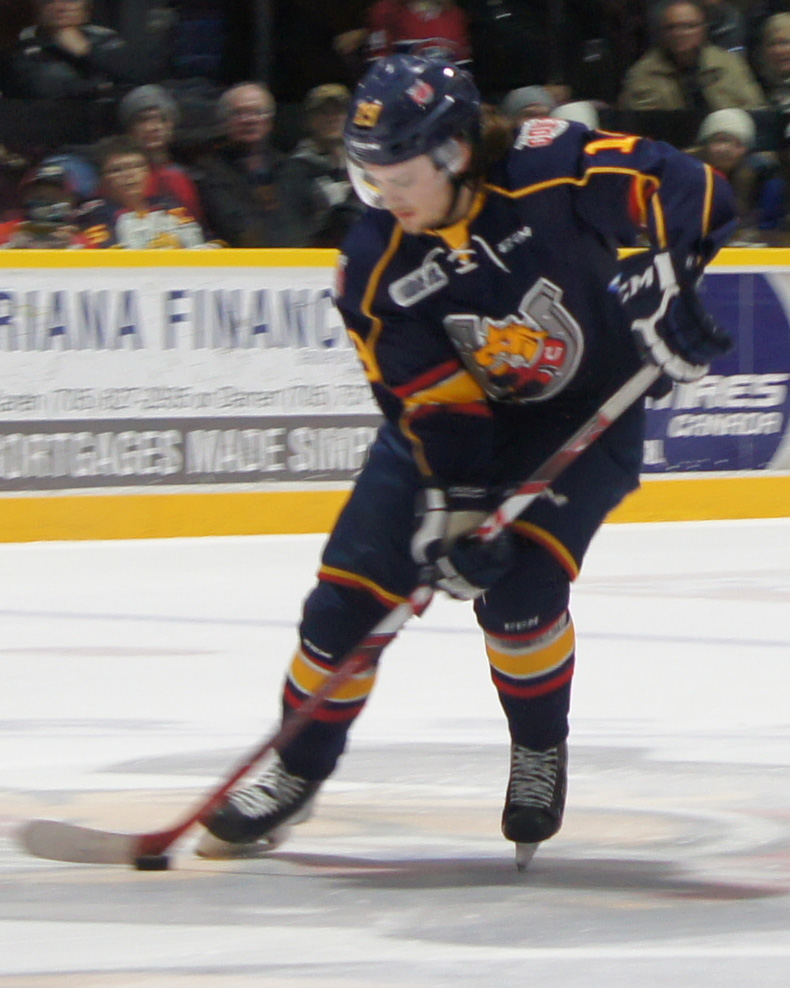
Rasmus Andersson was selected 53rd overall by the Calgary Flames.

#	Player	Nationality	NHL team	College/junior/club team
31	Jeremy Roy (D)	Canada	San Jose Sharks (from Buffalo via Colorado)^{1}	Sherbrooke Phoenix (QMJHL)
32	Christian Fischer (RW)	United States	Arizona Coyotes	U.S. NTDP (USHL)
33	Mitchell Stephens (C)	Canada	Tampa Bay Lightning (from Edmonton via NY Islanders)^{2}	Saginaw Spirit (OHL)
34	Travis Dermott (D)	Canada	Toronto Maple Leafs (from Toronto via Los Angeles and Columbus)^{3}	Erie Otters (OHL)
35	Sebastian Aho (LW)	Finland	Carolina Hurricanes	Kärpät (Liiga)
36	Gabriel Gagne (RW)	Canada	Ottawa Senators (from New Jersey)^{4}	Victoriaville Tigres (QMJHL)
37	Brandon Carlo (D)	United States	Boston Bruins (from Philadelphia via NY Islanders)^{5}	Tri-City Americans (WHL)
38	Paul Bittner (LW)	United States	Columbus Blue Jackets	Portland Winterhawks (WHL)
39	A.J. Greer (LW)	Canada	Colorado Avalanche (from San Jose)^{6}	Boston University Terriers (Hockey East)
40	Nicolas Meloche (D)	Canada	Colorado Avalanche	Baie-Comeau Drakkar (QMJHL)
41	Ryan Gropp (LW)	Canada	New York Rangers (from Florida via New Jersey via Anaheim)^{7}	Seattle Thunderbirds (WHL)
42	Mackenzie Blackwood (G)	Canada	New Jersey Devils (from Dallas via Ottawa)^{8}	Barrie Colts (OHL)
43	Erik Cernak (D)	Slovakia	Los Angeles Kings (from Los Angeles via Buffalo)^{9}	HC Kosice (Slovak Extraliga)
44	Matthew Spencer (D)	Canada	Tampa Bay Lightning (from Boston)^{10}	Peterborough Petes (OHL)
45	Jakob Forsbacka Karlsson (C)	Sweden	Boston Bruins (from Calgary)^{11}	Omaha Lancers (USHL)
46	Daniel Sprong (RW)	Netherlands	Pittsburgh Penguins	Charlottetown Islanders (QMJHL)
47	Jansen Harkins (C)	Canada	Winnipeg Jets	Prince George Cougars (WHL)
48	Filip Chlapik (C)	Czech Republic	Ottawa Senators	Charlottetown Islanders (QMJHL)
49	Roope Hintz (LW)	Finland	Dallas Stars (from Detroit)^{12}	Ilves (Liiga)
50	Jordan Greenway (LW)	United States	Minnesota Wild	U.S. NTDP (USHL)
51	Brendan Guhle (D)	Canada	Buffalo Sabres (from NY Islanders)^{13}	Prince Albert Raiders (WHL)
52	Jeremy Lauzon (D)	Canada	Boston Bruins (from Washington via Calgary)^{14}	Rouyn-Noranda Huskies (QMJHL)
53	Rasmus Andersson (D)	Sweden	Calgary Flames (from Vancouver)^{15}	Barrie Colts (OHL)
54	Graham Knott (LW)	Canada	Chicago Blackhawks (compensatory)^{16}	Niagara IceDogs (OHL)
55	Yakov Trenin (C)	Russia	Nashville Predators	Gatineau Olympiques (QMJHL)
56	Vince Dunn (D)	Canada	St. Louis Blues	Niagara IceDogs (OHL)
57	Jonas Siegenthaler (D)	Switzerland	Washington Capitals (from Montreal via Edmonton and NY Rangers)^{17}	ZSC Lions (NLA)
58	Kevin Stenlund (C)	Sweden	Columbus Blue Jackets (from Anaheim)^{18}	HV71 J20 (J20 SuperElit)
59	Julius Nattinen (C)	Finland	Anaheim Ducks (from NY Rangers)^{19}	JYP-Akatemia (Mestis)
60	Oliver Kylington (D)	Sweden	Calgary Flames (from Tampa Bay via NY Rangers and Arizona)^{20}	Farjestad BK (SHL)
61	Jeremy Bracco (RW)	United States	Toronto Maple Leafs (from Chicago via Philadelphia)^{21}	U.S. NTDP (USHL)

Notes

1. The Buffalo Sabres' second-round pick went to the San Jose Sharks as the result of a trade on June 27, 2015, that sent a second-round pick in 2015 (39th overall), Colorado's second-round pick in 2016 and Colorado's sixth-round pick in 2017 to Colorado in exchange for this pick.
  Colorado previously acquired this pick from as the result of a trade on June 26, 2015, that sent Ryan O'Reilly and Jamie McGinn to Buffalo in exchange for Nikita Zadorov, Mikhail Grigorenko, J. T. Compher and this pick.
2. The Edmonton Oilers' second-round pick went to the Tampa Bay Lightning as the result of a trade on June 26, 2015, that sent the Rangers' first-round pick in 2015 (28th overall) to the New York Islanders in exchange for Florida's third-round pick in 2015 (72nd overall) and this pick.
  The Islanders previously acquired this pick as the result of a trade on June 26, 2015, that sent Griffin Reinhart to Edmonton in exchange for Pittsburgh's first-round pick in 2015 (16th overall) and this pick.
3. The Toronto Maple Leafs' second-round pick was re-acquired as the result of a trade on June 26, 2015, that sent Tampa Bay's first-round pick in 2015 (29th overall) to Columbus in exchange for Philadelphia's third-round pick in 2015 (68th overall) and this pick.
  Columbus previously acquired this pick as the result of a trade on March 5, 2014, that sent Marian Gaborik to Los Angeles in exchange for Matt Frattin, a conditional third-round pick in 2014 and this pick.
  Los Angeles previously acquired this pick as the result of a trade on June 23, 2013, that sent Jonathan Bernier to Toronto in exchange for Ben Scrivens, Matt Frattin and this pick (being conditional at the time of the trade). The condition – Los Angeles will receive a second-round pick in 2014 or 2015 at Toronto's choice – was converted on January 18, 2014, when Toronto's second-round pick in 2014 was traded to the Anaheim Ducks.
4. The New Jersey Devils' second-round pick went to the Ottawa Senators as the result of a trade on June 27, 2015, that sent Dallas' second-round pick in 2015 (42nd overall) and a conditional third-round pick in 2016 to New Jersey in exchange for this pick.
5. The Philadelphia Flyers' second-round pick went to the Boston Bruins as the result of a trade on October 4, 2014, that sent Johnny Boychuk to New York in exchange for a second-round pick in 2016, a conditional third-round pick in 2015 and this pick.
  The Islanders previously acquired this pick as the result of a trade March 4, 2014, that sent Andrew MacDonald to Philadelphia in exchange for Matt Mangene, a third-round pick in 2014 and this pick.
6. The San Jose Sharks' second-round pick went to the Colorado Avalanche as the result of a trade on June 27, 2015, that sent Buffalo's second-round pick in 2015 (31st overall) to San Jose in exchange for Colorado's second-round pick in 2016, Colorado's sixth-round pick in 2017 and this pick.
7. The Florida Panthers' second-round pick went to the New York Rangers as the result of a trade on June 27, 2015, that sent Carl Hagelin and a second and sixth-round pick in 2015 (59th and 179th overall) to Anaheim in exchange for Emerson Etem and this pick.
  Anaheim previously acquired this pick as the result of a trade on June 26, 2015, that sent Kyle Palmieri to New Jersey in exchange for a third-round pick in 2016 and this pick.
  New Jersey previously acquired this pick as the result of a trade on February 26, 2015, that sent Jaromir Jagr to Florida in exchange for a conditional third-round pick in 2016 and this pick.
8. The Dallas Stars' second-round pick went to the New Jersey Devils as the result of a trade on June 27, 2015, that sent a second-round pick in 2015 (36th overall) to Ottawa in exchange for a conditional a third-round pick in 2016 and this pick.
  Ottawa previously acquired this pick as the result of a trade on July 1, 2014, that sent Jason Spezza and Ludwig Karlsson to the Stars in exchange for Alex Chiasson, Nick Paul, Alex Guptill and this pick.
9. The Los Angeles Kings' second-round pick was re-acquired as the result of a trade on March 5, 2014, that sent Hudson Fasching and Nicolas Deslauriers to Buffalo in exchange for Brayden McNabb, Jonathan Parker, Los Angeles' second-round pick in 2014 and this pick.
  Buffalo previously acquired this pick as the result of a trade on April 1, 2013, that sent Robyn Regehr to Los Angeles in exchange for a second-round pick in 2014 and this pick.
10. The Boston Bruins' second-round pick went to the Tampa Bay Lightning as the result of a trade on March 2, 2015, that sent Brett Connolly to Boston in exchange for a second-round pick in 2016 and this pick.
11. The Calgary Flames' second-round pick went to the Boston Bruins as the result of a trade on June 26, 2015, that sent Dougie Hamilton to Calgary in exchange for a first-round pick in 2015 (15th overall), Washington's second-round pick in 2015 (52nd overall) and this pick.
12. The Detroit Red Wings' second-round pick went to the Dallas Stars as the result of a trade on March 1, 2015, that sent Erik Cole and a conditional third-round pick in 2015 to Detroit in exchange for Mattias Janmark, Mattias Backman and this pick.
13. The New York Islanders' second-round pick went to the Buffalo Sabres as the result of a trade on October 27, 2013, that sent Thomas Vanek to New York in exchange for Matt Moulson, a conditional first-round pick in 2014 and this pick.
14. The Washington Capitals' second-round pick went to the Boston Bruins as the result of a trade on June 26, 2015, that sent Dougie Hamilton to Calgary in exchange for a first and second-round pick in 2015 (15th and 45th overall) and this pick.
  Calgary previously acquired this pick as the result of a trade on March 1, 2015, that sent Curtis Glencross to Washington in exchange for a third-round pick in 2015 and this pick.
15. The Vancouver Canucks' second-round pick went to the Calgary Flames as the result of a trade on March 2, 2015, that sent Sven Baertschi to Vancouver in exchange for this pick.
16. The Chicago Blackhawks received the 24th pick of this round (54th overall) as compensation for not signing 2010 first-round draft pick Kevin Hayes.
17. The Montreal Canadiens' second-round pick went to the Washington Capitals as the result of a trade on June 27, 2015, that sent Buffalo's third-round pick in 2015 (62nd overall) and a fourth-round pick in 2015 (113th overall) to New York in exchange for this pick.
  The Rangers previously acquired this pick as the result of a trade on June 27, 2015, that sent Cam Talbot and a seventh-round pick in 2015 (209th overall) to Edmonton in exchange for Ottawa's third-round pick in 2015 (79th overall), a seventh-round pick in 2015 (184th overall) and this pick.
  Edmonton previously acquired this pick as the result of a trade on March 2, 2015, that sent Jeff Petry to Montreal in exchange for a conditional fifth-round pick in 2015 and this pick.
18. The Anaheim Ducks' second-round pick went to the Columbus Blue Jackets as the result of a trade on March 2, 2015, that sent James Wisniewski and Detroit's third-round pick in 2015 to Anaheim in exchange for Rene Bourque, William Karlsson and this pick.
19. The New York Rangers' second-round pick went to the Anaheim Ducks as the result of a trade on June 27, 2015, that sent Emerson Etem and Florida's second-round pick in 2015 (41st overall) to New York in exchange for Carl Hagelin, a sixth-round pick in 2015 (179th overall) and this pick.
20. The Tampa Bay Lightning's second-round pick went to the Calgary Flames as the result of a trade on June 27, 2015, that sent Calgary and Washington's third-round picks both in 2015 (76th and 83rd overall) to Arizona in exchange for this pick.
  Arizona previously acquired this pick, as the result of a trade on March 1, 2015, that sent Keith Yandle, Chris Summers and a fourth-round pick in 2016 to New York in exchange for John Moore, Anthony Duclair, a conditional first-round pick in 2016 and this pick.
  The Rangers previously acquired this pick as the result of a trade March 5, 2014, that sent Ryan Callahan, a conditional first-round pick in 2014, a first-round pick in 2015, and a conditional seventh-round pick in 2015 to Tampa Bay in exchange for Martin St. Louis and this pick (being conditional at the time of the trade). The condition – the Rangers will receive a second-round pick in 2015 if Callahan is re-signed by Tampa Bay for the 2014–15 NHL season – was converted on June 25, 2014, when Tampa Bay signed Callahan to a six-year contract.
21. The Chicago Blackhawks' second-round pick went to the Toronto Maple Leafs as the result of a trade on June 26, 2015, that Nashville's first-round pick in 2015 (24th overall) to Philadelphia in exchange for Tampa Bay's first-round pick in 2015 (29th overall) and this pick.
  Philadelphia previously acquired this pick as the result of a trade on February 27, 2015, that sent Kimmo Timonen to Chicago in exchange for a conditional fourth-round pick in 2016 and this pick.

=== Round three ===
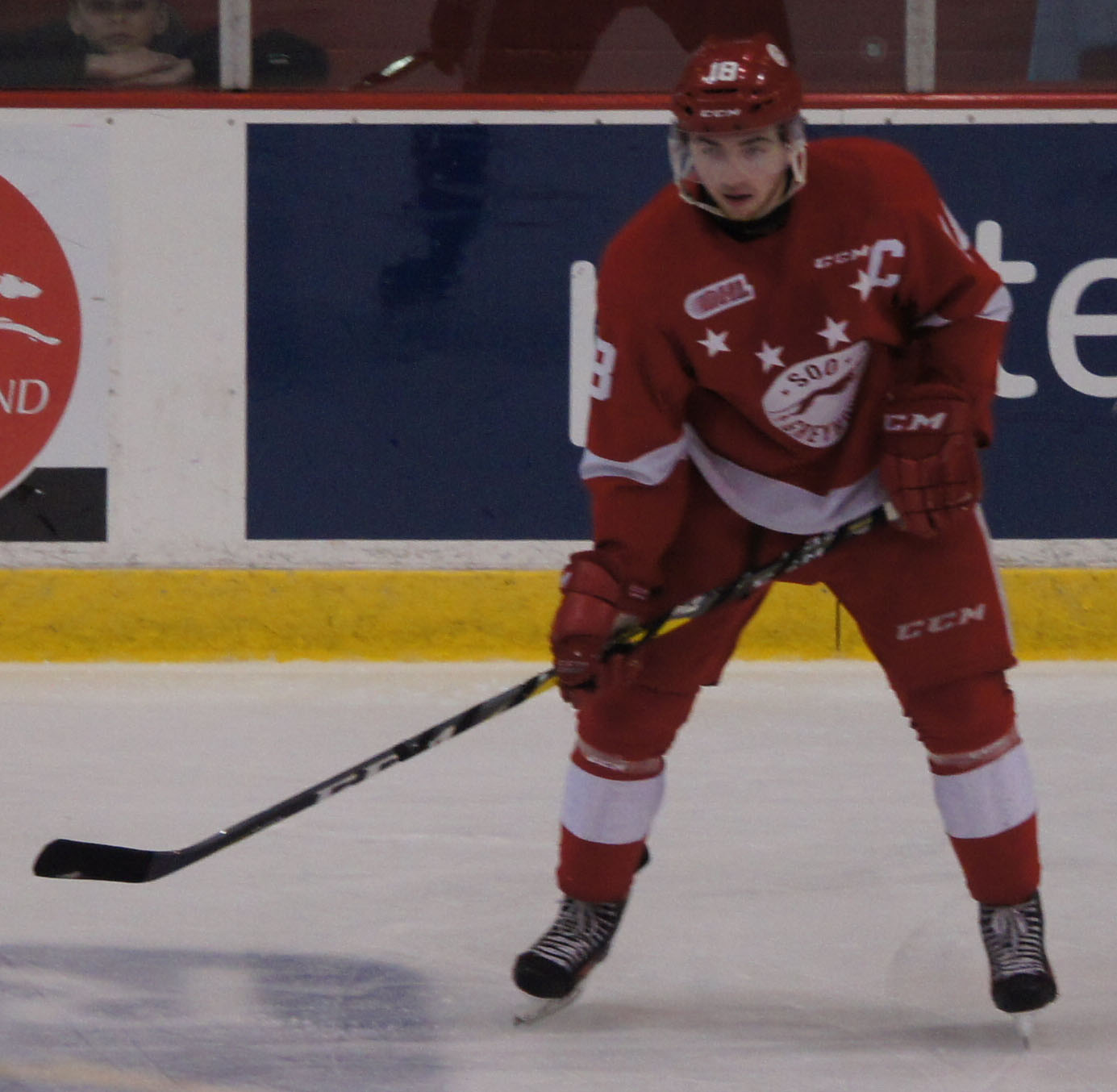
Blake Speers was selected 67th overall by the New Jersey Devils.

#	Player	Nationality	NHL team	College/junior/club team
62	Robin Kovacs (RW)	Sweden	New York Rangers (from Buffalo via Washington)^{1}	AIK IF (HockeyAllsvenskan)
63	Kyle Capobianco (D)	Canada	Arizona Coyotes	Sudbury Wolves (OHL)
64	Dennis Yan (LW)	United States	Tampa Bay Lightning (from Edmonton via Anaheim)^{2}	Shawinigan Cataractes (QMJHL)
65	Andrew Nielsen (D)	Canada	Toronto Maple Leafs	Lethbridge Hurricanes (WHL)
66	Guillaume Brisebois (D)	Canada	Vancouver Canucks (from Carolina)^{3}	Acadie–Bathurst Titan (QMJHL)
67	Blake Speers (C)	Canada	New Jersey Devils	Sault Ste. Marie Greyhounds (OHL)
68	Martins Dzierkals (LW)	Latvia	Toronto Maple Leafs (from Philadelphia via Columbus)^{4}	HK Riga (MHL)
69	Keegan Kolesar (RW)	Canada	Columbus Blue Jackets	Seattle Thunderbirds (WHL)
70	Felix Sandstrom (G)	Sweden	Philadelphia Flyers (from San Jose)^{5}	Brynas IF J20 (J20 SuperElit)
71	Jean-Christophe Beaudin (C)	Canada	Colorado Avalanche	Rouyn-Noranda Huskies (QMJHL)
72	Anthony Cirelli (C)	Canada	Tampa Bay Lightning (from Florida via NY Islanders)^{6}	Oshawa Generals (OHL)
73	Vili Saarijarvi (D)	Finland	Detroit Red Wings (from Dallas)^{7}	Green Bay Gamblers (USHL)
74	Alexander Dergachyov (C)	Russia	Los Angeles Kings	SKA-1946 St. Petersburg (MHL)
75	Dan Vladar (G)	Czech Republic	Boston Bruins	Rytiri Kladno (Czech 1. Liga)
76	Adin Hill (G)	Canada	Arizona Coyotes (from Calgary)^{8}	Portland Winterhawks (WHL)
77	Samuel Montembeault (G)	Canada	Florida Panthers (from Pittsburgh)^{9}	Blainville-Boisbriand Armada (QMJHL)
78	Erik Foley (LW)	United States	Winnipeg Jets	Cedar Rapids RoughRiders (USHL)
79	Sergei Zborovskiy (D)	Russia	New York Rangers (from Ottawa via Edmonton)^{10}	Regina Pats (WHL)
80	Brent Gates (C)	United States	Anaheim Ducks (from Detroit via Columbus)^{11}	Green Bay Gamblers (USHL)
81	Brendan Warren (LW)	United States	Arizona Coyotes (from Minnesota)^{12}	U.S. NTDP (USHL)
82	Mitchell Vande Sompel (D)	Canada	New York Islanders	Oshawa Generals (OHL)
83	Jens Looke (RW)	Sweden	Arizona Coyotes (from Washington via Calgary)^{13}	Brynas IF (SHL)
84	Deven Sideroff (RW)	Canada	Anaheim Ducks (from Vancouver)^{14}	Kamloops Blazers (WHL)
85	Tommy Novak (C)	United States	Nashville Predators	Waterloo Black Hawks (USHL)
86	Mike Robinson (G)	United States	San Jose Sharks (from St. Louis via Edmonton)^{15}	Lawrence Academy Spartans (HS-Massachusetts)
87	Lukas Vejdemo (C)	Sweden	Montreal Canadiens	Djurgardens IF J20 (J20 SuperElit)
88	Thomas Schemitsch (D)	Canada	Florida Panthers (from Anaheim)^{16}	Owen Sound Attack (OHL)
89	Aleksi Saarela (C)	Finland	New York Rangers	Porin Ässät (Liiga)
90	Matej Tomek (G)	Slovakia	Philadelphia Flyers (from Tampa Bay)^{17}	Topeka RoadRunners (NAHL)
91	Dennis Gilbert (D)	United States	Chicago Blackhawks	Chicago Steel (USHL)

Notes

1. The Buffalo Sabres' third-round pick went to the New York Rangers as the result of a trade on June 27, 2015, that sent Montreal's second-round pick in 2015 (57th overall) to Washington in exchange for and a fourth-round pick in 2015 (113th overall) and this pick.
  Washington previously acquired this pick as the result of a trade on March 5, 2014, that sent Michal Neuvirth and Rostislav Klesla to Buffalo in exchange for Jaroslav Halak and this pick.
2. The Edmonton Oilers' third-round pick went to the Tampa Bay Lightning as the result of a trade on November 28, 2014, that sent Eric Brewer to Anaheim in exchange for this pick.
  Anaheim previously acquired this pick as the result of a trade on March 4, 2014, that sent Viktor Fasth to Edmonton in exchange for a fifth-round pick in 2014 and this pick.
3. The Carolina Hurricanes' third-round pick went to the Vancouver Canucks as the result of a trade on June 27, 2015, that sent Eddie Lack to Carolina in exchange for a seventh-round pick in 2016 and this pick.
4. The Philadelphia Flyers' third-round pick went the Toronto Maple Leafs as the result of a trade on June 26, 2015, that sent Tampa Bay's first-round pick in 2015 (29th overall) to Columbus in exchange for Toronto's second-round pick in 2015 (34th overall) and this pick.
  Columbus previously acquired this pick as the result of a trade on April 3, 2013, that sent Steve Mason to Philadelphia in exchange for Michael Leighton and this pick.
5. The San Jose Sharks' third-round pick went to the Philadelphia Flyers as the result of a trade on July 2, 2014, that sent Tye McGinn to San Jose in exchange for this pick.
6. The Florida Panthers' third-round pick went to the Tampa Bay Lightning as the result of a trade on June 26, 2015, that sent the Rangers' first-round pick in 2015 (28th overall) to the New York Islanders in exchange for Edmonton's second-round pick in 2015 (33rd overall) and this pick.
  The Islanders previously acquired this pick as the result of a trade on June 28, 2014, that sent a third-round pick in 2014 to Florida in exchange for this pick.
7. The Dallas Stars' third-round pick went to the Detroit Red Wings as the result of a trade on March 1, 2015, that sent Mattias Janmark, Mattias Backman, and a second-round pick in 2015 to Dallas in exchange for Erik Cole and this pick (being conditional at the time of the trade). The condition – Detroit will receive a third-round pick in 2015 if they do not qualify for the 2015 Eastern Conference Final and Cole does not play in 50% of Detroit's playoff games – was converted on April 8, 2015, when Cole was injured for the remainder of the season.
8. The Calgary Flames' third-round pick went to the Arizona Coyotes as the result of a trade on June 27, 2015, that sent Tampa Bay's second-round pick in 2015 (60th overall) to Calgary in exchange for Washington's third-round pick in 2015 (83rd overall) and this pick.
9. The Pittsburgh Penguins' third-round pick went to the Florida Panthers as the result of a trade on March 5, 2014, that sent Marcel Goc to Pittsburgh in exchange for a fifth-round pick in 2014 and this pick.
10. The Ottawa Senators' third-round pick went to the New York Rangers as the result of a trade on June 27, 2015, that sent Cam Talbot and a seventh-round pick in 2015 (209th overall) to Edmonton in exchange for Montreal's second-round pick in 2015 (57th overall), a seventh-round pick in 2015 (184th overall) and this pick.
  Edmonton previously acquired this pick as the result of a trade on March 5, 2014, that sent Ales Hemsky to Ottawa in exchange for a fifth-round pick in 2014 and this pick.
11. The Detroit Red Wings' third-round pick went to the Anaheim Ducks as the result of a trade on March 2, 2015, that sent Rene Bourque, William Karlsson and a second-round pick in 2015 to Columbus in exchange for James Wisniewski and this pick.
  Columbus previously acquired this pick as the result of a trade on June 28, 2014, that sent Edmonton's third-round pick in 2014 to Detroit in exchange for a third-round pick in 2014 and this pick.
12. The Minnesota Wild's third-round pick went to the Arizona Coyotes as the result of a trade on January 14, 2015, that sent Devan Dubnyk to Minnesota in exchange for this pick.
13. The Washington Capitals' third-round pick went to the Arizona Coyotes as the result of a trade on June 27, 2015, that sent Tampa Bay's second-round pick in 2015 (60th overall) to Calgary in exchange for a third-round pick in 2015 (76th overall) and this pick.
  Calgary previously acquired this pick as the result of a trade on March 1, 2015, that sent Curtis Glencross to Washington in exchange for a second-round pick in 2015 and this pick.
14. The Vancouver Canucks' third-round pick went to the Anaheim Ducks as the result of a trade on June 27, 2014, that sent Nick Bonino, Luca Sbisa and a first and third-round pick in 2014 to Vancouver in exchange for Ryan Kesler and this pick.
15. The St. Louis Blues' third-round pick went the San Jose Sharks as compensation for Edmonton hiring Todd McLellan as their head coach on May 19, 2015.
  Edmonton previously acquired this pick as the result of a trade on July 10, 2013, that sent Magnus Paajarvi, a second-round pick in 2014 and a fourth-round pick in 2015 to St. Louis in exchange for David Perron and this pick.
16. The Anaheim Ducks' third-round pick went to the Florida Panthers as the result of a trade on February 28, 2015, that sent Tomas Fleischmann to Anaheim in exchange for Dany Heatley and this pick.
17. The Tampa Bay Lightning's third-round pick went to the Philadelphia Flyers as the result of a trade on March 2, 2015, that sent Braydon Coburn to Tampa Bay in exchange for Radko Gudas, a conditional first-round pick in 2015 and this pick.

=== Round four ===
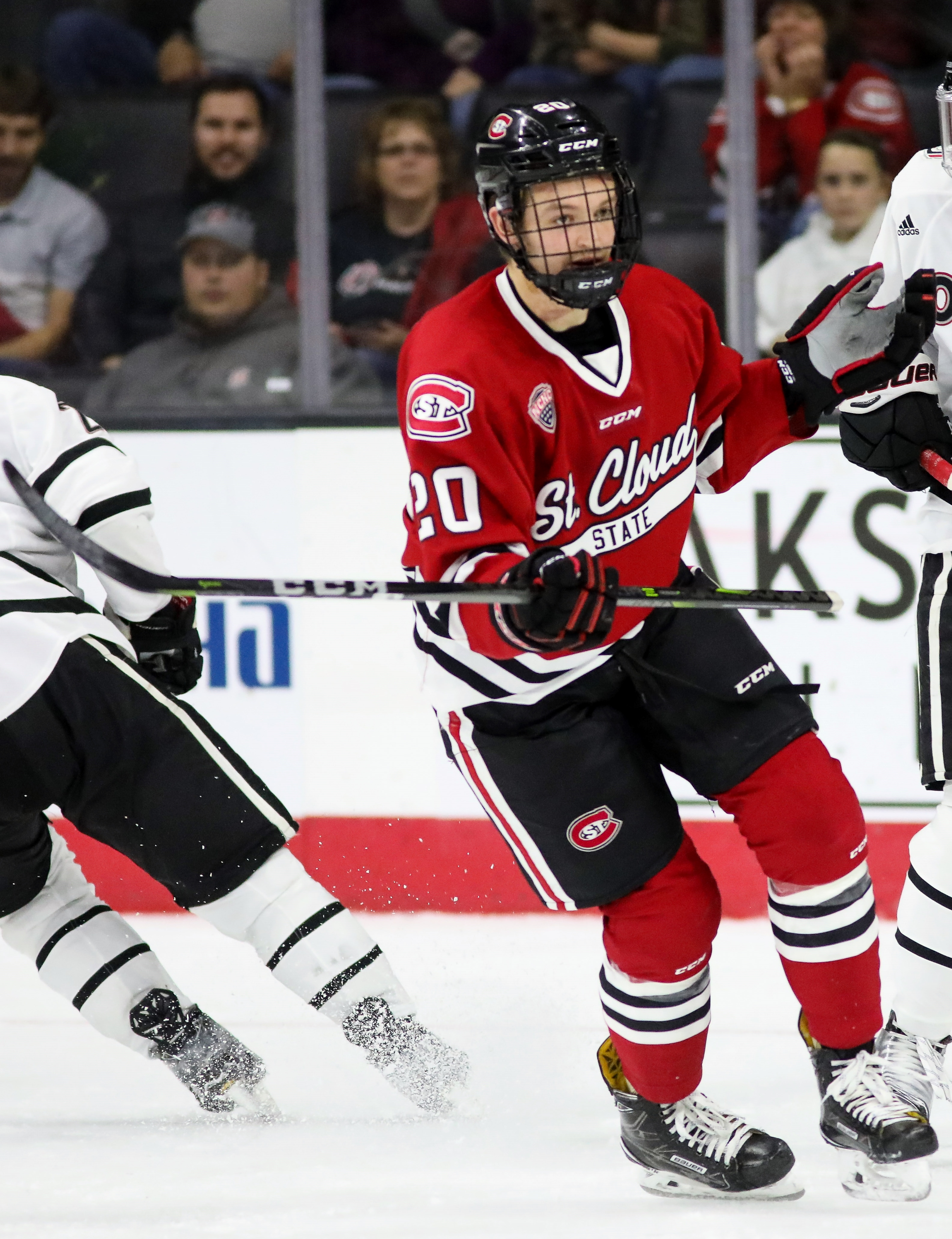
William Borgen was selected 92nd overall by the Buffalo Sabres.

#	Player	Nationality	NHL team	College/junior/club team
92	William Borgen (D)	United States	Buffalo Sabres	Moorhead Spuds (HS-Minnesota)
93	Callum Booth (G)	Canada	Carolina Hurricanes (from Arizona via Washington)^{1}	Quebec Remparts (QMJHL)
94	Adam Musil (C)	Canada	St. Louis Blues (from Edmonton)^{2}	Red Deer Rebels (WHL)
95	Jesper Lindgren (D)	Sweden	Toronto Maple Leafs	Modo Hockey (SHL)
96	Nicolas Roy (C)	Canada	Carolina Hurricanes	Chicoutimi Sagueneens (QMJHL)
97	Colton White (D)	Canada	New Jersey Devils	Sault Ste. Marie Greyhounds (OHL)
98	Samuel Dove-McFalls (LW)	Canada	Philadelphia Flyers	Saint John Sea Dogs (QMJHL)
99	Austin Wagner (LW)	Canada	Los Angeles Kings (from Columbus via Philadelphia)^{3}	Regina Pats (WHL)
100	Anthony Richard (C)	Canada	Nashville Predators (from San Jose)^{4}	Val-d'Or Foreurs (QMJHL)
101	Andrei Mironov (D)	Russia	Colorado Avalanche	Dynamo Moscow (KHL)
102	Denis Malgin (C)	Switzerland	Florida Panthers	ZSC Lions (NLA)
103	Chris Martenet (D)	United States	Dallas Stars	London Knights (OHL)
104	Mikhail Vorobyev (C)	Russia	Philadelphia Flyers (from Los Angeles)^{5}	Tolpar Ufa (MHL)
105	Jesse Gabrielle (LW)	Canada	Boston Bruins	Regina Pats (WHL)
106	Adam Helewka (LW)	Canada	San Jose Sharks (from Calgary)^{6}	Spokane Chiefs (WHL)
107	Christian Wolanin (D)	Canada	Ottawa Senators (from Pittsburgh via Toronto and Edmonton)^{7}	Muskegon Lumberjacks (USHL)
108	Michael Spacek (RW)	Czech Republic	Winnipeg Jets	HC Pardubice (Czech Extraliga)
109	Filip Ahl (LW)	Sweden	Ottawa Senators	HV71 (SHL)
110	Joren van Pottelberghe (G)	Switzerland	Detroit Red Wings	Linkoping J18 (J18 Elit)
111	Ales Stezka (G)	Czech Republic	Minnesota Wild	Bili Tygri Liberec U20 (CZE U20)
112	Parker Wotherspoon (D)	Canada	New York Islanders	Tri-City Americans (WHL)
113	Brad Morrison (C)	Canada	New York Rangers (from Washington)^{8}	Prince George Cougars (WHL)
114	Dmitri Zhukenov (C)	Russia	Vancouver Canucks	Omskie Yastreby (MHL)
115	Alexandre Carrier (D)	Canada	Nashville Predators	Gatineau Olympiques (QMJHL)
116	Glenn Gawdin (C)	Canada	St. Louis Blues	Swift Current Broncos (WHL)
117	Caleb Jones (D)	United States	Edmonton Oilers (from Montreal)^{9}	U.S. NTDP (USHL)
118	Jonne Tammela (RW)	Finland	Tampa Bay Lightning (from Anaheim)^{10}	KalPa (Liiga)
119	Daniel Bernhardt (RW)	Sweden	New York Rangers	Djurgardens IF J20 (J20 SuperElit)
120	Mathieu Joseph (RW)	Canada	Tampa Bay Lightning	Saint John Sea Dogs (QMJHL)
121	Ryan Shea (D)	United States	Chicago Blackhawks	BC High Eagles (HS-Massachusetts)

Notes

1. The Arizona Coyotes' fourth-round pick went to the Carolina Hurricanes as the result of a trade on February 28, 2015, that sent Tim Gleason to Washington in exchange for Jack Hillen and this pick.
  Washington previously acquired this pick as the result of a trade on March 4, 2014, that sent Martin Erat and John Mitchell to Phoenix in exchange for Rostislav Klesla, Chris Brown and this pick.
2. The Edmonton Oilers' fourth-round pick went to the St. Louis Blues as the result of a trade on July 10, 2013, that sent David Perron and a third-round pick in 2015 to Edmonton in exchange for Magnus Paajarvi, a second-round pick in 2014 and this pick.
3. The Columbus Blue Jackets' fourth-round pick went to the Los Angeles Kings as the result of a trade on June 27, 2015, that sent a fourth-round pick in 2015 (104th overall) and a sixth-round pick in 2016 to Philadelphia in exchange for this pick.
  Philadelphia previously acquired this pick as the result of a trade on June 23, 2014, that sent Scott Hartnell to Columbus in exchange for R. J. Umberger and this pick.
4. The San Jose Sharks' fourth-round pick went to the Nashville Predators as the result of a trade on June 28, 2014, that sent Detroit's second-round pick in 2014 to San Jose in exchange for a second-round pick in 2014 and this pick.
5. The Los Angeles Kings' fourth-round pick went to the Philadelphia Flyers as the result of a trade on June 27, 2015, that sent Columbus' fourth-round pick in 2015 (99th overall) to Los Angeles in exchange for a sixth-round pick in 2016 and this pick.
6. The Calgary Flames' fourth-round pick went to the San Jose Sharks as the result of a trade on July 2, 2013, that sent TJ Galiardi to Calgary in exchange for this pick.
7. The Pittsburgh Penguins' fourth-round pick went to the Ottawa Senators as the result of a trade on June 27, 2015, that sent Eric Gryba to Edmonton in exchange for Travis Ewanyk and this pick.
  Edmonton previously acquired this pick as the result of a trade on June 27, 2015, that sent Martin Marincin to Toronto in exchange for Brad Ross and this pick.
  Toronto previously acquired this pick as the result of a trade on February 25, 2015, that sent Daniel Winnik to Pittsburgh in exchange for Zach Sill, a second-round pick in 2016 and this pick.
8. The Washington Capitals' fourth-round pick went to the New York Rangers as the result of a trade on June 27, 2015, that sent Montreal's second-round pick in 2015 (57th overall) to Washington in exchange for and Buffalo's third-round pick in 2015 (62nd overall) and this pick.
9. The Montreal Canadiens' fourth-round pick went to the Edmonton Oilers as the result of a trade on March 2, 2015, that sent Jeff Petry to Montreal in exchange for a second-round pick in 2015 and this pick (being conditional at the time of the trade). The condition – Edmonton will receive a fourth-round pick in 2015 if Montreal advances to the second round of the 2015 Stanley Cup playoffs – was converted on April 26, 2015, when Montreal eliminated Ottawa in the first-round of the 2015 Stanley Cup playoffs.
10. The Anaheim Ducks' fourth-round pick went to the Tampa Bay Lightning as the result of a trade on June 29, 2014, that sent Nate Thompson to Anaheim in exchange for a seventh-round pick in 2015 and this pick.

=== Round five ===
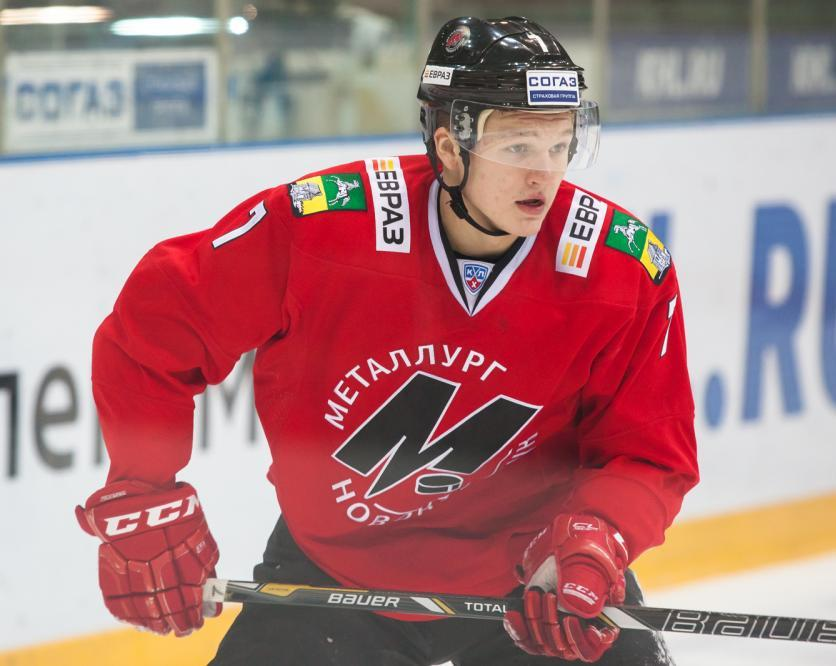
Kirill Kaprizov was selected 135th overall by the Minnesota Wild.

#	Player	Nationality	NHL team	College/junior/club team
122	Devante Stephens (D)	Canada	Buffalo Sabres	Kelowna Rockets (WHL)
123	Conor Garland (RW)	United States	Arizona Coyotes	Moncton Wildcats (QMJHL)
124	Ethan Bear (D)	Canada	Edmonton Oilers	Seattle Thunderbirds (WHL)
125	Dmytro Timashov (LW)	Sweden	Toronto Maple Leafs	Quebec Remparts (QMJHL)
126	Luke Stevens (LW)	United States	Carolina Hurricanes	Noble and Greenough Bulldogs (HS-Massachusetts)
127	Niko Mikkola (D)	Finland	St. Louis Blues (from New Jersey)^{1}	KalPa U20 (Nuorten SM-liiga)
128	David Kase (RW)	Czech Republic	Philadelphia Flyers	Pirati Chomutov (Czech 1. Liga)
129	Sam Ruopp (D)	Canada	Columbus Blue Jackets	Prince George Cougars (WHL)
130	Karlis Cukste (D)	Latvia	San Jose Sharks	HK Riga (MHL)
131	Matthew Bradley (C)	Italy	Montreal Canadiens (from Colorado)^{2}	Medicine Hat Tigers (WHL)
132	Karch Bachman (LW)	United States	Florida Panthers	Culver Academies Eagles (HS-Indiana)
133	Joseph Cecconi (D)	United States	Dallas Stars	Muskegon Lumberjacks (USHL)
134	Matt Schmalz (RW)	Canada	Los Angeles Kings	Sudbury Wolves (OHL)
135	Kirill Kaprizov (LW)	Russia	Minnesota Wild (from Boston)^{3}	Metallurg Novokuznetsk (KHL)
136	Pavel Karnaukhov (LW)	Belarus	Calgary Flames	Calgary Hitmen (WHL)
137	Dominik Simon (LW)	Czech Republic	Pittsburgh Penguins	HC Plzen (Czech Extraliga)
138	Spencer Smallman (RW)	Canada	Carolina Hurricanes (from Winnipeg)^{4}	Saint John Sea Dogs (QMJHL)
139	Christian Jaros (D)	Slovakia	Ottawa Senators	Lulea HF (SHL)
140	Chase Pearson (C)	Canada	Detroit Red Wings	Youngstown Phantoms (USHL)
141	Veeti Vainio (D)	Finland	Columbus Blue Jackets (from Minnesota)^{5}	Espoo Blues U20 Jr. (Nuorten SM-liiga)
142	Rudolfs Balcers (LW)	Latvia	San Jose Sharks (from NY Islanders)^{6}	Stavanger Oilers (GET-ligaen)
143	Connor Hobbs (D)	Canada	Washington Capitals	Regina Pats (WHL)
144	Carl Neill (D)	Canada	Vancouver Canucks	Sherbrooke Phoenix (QMJHL)
145	Karel Vejmelka (G)	Czech Republic	Nashville Predators	HC Pardubice U20 (CZE U20)
146	Luke Opilka (G)	United States	St. Louis Blues	U.S. NTDP (USHL)
147	Ryan Pilon (D)	Canada	New York Islanders (from Montreal via Florida)^{7}	Brandon Wheat Kings (WHL)
148	Troy Terry (RW/C)	United States	Anaheim Ducks	U.S. NTDP (USHL)
149	Adam Gaudette (C)	United States	Vancouver Canucks (from NY Rangers)^{8}	Cedar Rapids RoughRiders (USHL)
150	Ryan Zuhlsdorf (D)	United States	Tampa Bay Lightning	Sioux City Musketeers (USHL)
151	Radovan Bondra (RW)	Slovakia	Chicago Blackhawks	HC Kosice (Slovak Extraliga)

Notes

1. The New Jersey Devils' fifth-round pick went to the St. Louis Blues as the result of a trade on March 22, 2013, that sent Matt D'Agostini and a seventh-round pick in 2015 to New Jersey in exchange for this pick (being conditional at the time of the trade). The condition – If D'Agostini is not re-signed by New Jersey then St. Louis will receive a fifth-round pick in 2015 – was converted on July 10, 2013.
2. The Colorado Avalanche's fifth-round pick went to the Montreal Canadiens as the result of a trade on June 30, 2014, that sent Daniel Briere to Colorado in exchange for P.A. Parenteau and this pick.
3. The Boston Bruins' fifth-round pick went to the Minnesota Wild as the result of a trade on June 27, 2015, that sent a fifth-round pick in 2016 to Boston in exchange for this pick.
4. The Winnipeg Jets' fifth-round pick went to the Carolina Hurricanes as the result of a trade on February 25, 2015, that sent Jiri Tlusty to Winnipeg in exchange for a third-round pick in 2016 and this pick (being conditional at the time of the trade). The condition – Carolina will receive a fifth-round pick in 2015 if Winnipeg qualifies for the 2015 Stanley Cup playoffs – was converted on April 9, 2015.
5. The Minnesota Wild's fifth-round pick went to the Columbus Blue Jackets as the result of a trade on March 2, 2015, that sent Jordan Leopold to Minnesota in exchange for Justin Falk and this pick.
6. The New York Islanders' fifth-round pick went to the San Jose Sharks as the result of a trade on June 5, 2014, that sent Dan Boyle to New York in exchange for this pick (being conditional at the time of the trade). The condition – San Jose will receive a fifth-round pick in 2015 if Boyle is not re-signed by the Islanders for the 2014–15 NHL season – was converted on July 1, 2014.
7. The Montreal Canadiens' fifth-round pick went to the New York Islanders as the result of a trade on June 27, 2015, that sent a fifth-round pick in 2016 to Florida in exchange for this pick.
  Florida previously acquired this pick as the result of a trade on March 4, 2014, that sent Mike Weaver to Montreal in exchange for this pick.
8. The New York Rangers' fifth-round pick went to the Vancouver Canucks as the result of a trade on March 5, 2014, that sent Raphael Diaz to New York in exchange for this pick.

=== Round six ===
#	Player	Nationality	NHL team	College/junior/club team
152	Giorgio Estephan (C)	Canada	Buffalo Sabres	Lethbridge Hurricanes (WHL)
153	Kristian Oldham (G)	United States	Tampa Bay Lightning (from Arizona)^{1}	Omaha Lancers (USHL)
154	John Marino (D)	United States	Edmonton Oilers	South Shore Kings (USPHL)
155	Stephen Desrocher (D)	Canada	Toronto Maple Leafs	Oshawa Generals (OHL)
156	Jake Massie (D)	Canada	Carolina Hurricanes	Kimball Union Academy Wildcats (HS-New Hampshire)
157	Brett Seney (LW)	Canada	New Jersey Devils	Merrimack Warriors (Hockey East)
158	Cooper Marody (C)	United States	Philadelphia Flyers	Sioux Falls Stampede (USHL)
159	Vladislav Gavrikov (D)	Russia	Columbus Blue Jackets	Lokomotiv Yaroslavl (KHL)
160	Adam Parsells (D)	United States	San Jose Sharks	Wausau West High Warriors (HS-Wisconsin)
161	Sergei Boikov (D)	Russia	Colorado Avalanche	Drummondville Voltigeurs (QMJHL)
162	Christopher Wilkie (RW)	United States	Florida Panthers	Tri-City Storm (USHL)
163	Markus Ruusu (G)	Finland	Dallas Stars	JYP U20 (Nuorten SM-liiga)
164	Roy Radke (RW)	United States	Chicago Blackhawks (from Los Angeles)^{2}	Barrie Colts (OHL)
165	Cameron Hughes (C)	Canada	Boston Bruins	Wisconsin Badgers (Big Ten)
166	Andrew Mangiapane (LW)	Canada	Calgary Flames	Barrie Colts (OHL)
167	Frederik Tiffels (LW)	Germany	Pittsburgh Penguins	Western Michigan Broncos (NCHC)
168	Mason Appleton (C)	United States	Winnipeg Jets	Tri-City Storm (USHL)
169	David Cotton (C)	United States	Carolina Hurricanes (from Ottawa via Winnipeg)^{3}	Cushing Academy Penguins (HS-Massachusetts)
170	Patrick Holway (D)	United States	Detroit Red Wings	Boston Advantage (T1EHL)
171	Nicholas Boka (D)	United States	Minnesota Wild	U.S. NTDP (USHL)
172	Andong Song (D)	China	New York Islanders	Lawrenceville School Big Red (HS-New Jersey)
173	Colby Williams (D)	Canada	Washington Capitals	Regina Pats (WHL)
174	Lukas Jasek (RW)	Czech Republic	Vancouver Canucks	HC Ocelari Trinec (Czech Extraliga)
175	Tyler Moy (C)	United States	Nashville Predators	Harvard Crimson (ECAC)
176	Liam Dunda (LW)	Canada	St. Louis Blues	Owen Sound Attack (OHL)
177	Simon Bourque (D)	Canada	Montreal Canadiens	Rimouski Oceanic (QMJHL)
178	Steven Ruggiero (D)	United States	Anaheim Ducks	U.S. NTDP (USHL)
179	Garrett Metcalf (G)	United States	Anaheim Ducks (from NY Rangers)^{4}	Madison Capitols (USHL)
180	Bokondji Imama (LW)	Canada	Tampa Bay Lightning	Saint John Sea Dogs (QMJHL)
181	Joni Tuulola (D)	Finland	Chicago Blackhawks	HPK (Liiga)

Notes

1. The Arizona Coyotes' sixth-round pick went to the Tampa Bay Lightning as the result of a trade on June 29, 2014, that sent Sam Gagner and B. J. Crombeen to Arizona in exchange for this pick.
2. The Los Angeles Kings' sixth-round pick went the Chicago Blackhawks as the result of a trade on July 16, 2013, that sent Daniel Carcillo to Los Angeles in exchange for this pick (being conditional at the time of the trade). The condition – Chicago will receive a sixth-round pick in 2015 if Carcillo plays less than 40 games with Los Angeles during the 2013–14 NHL season – was converted on January 4, 2014, when Carcillo was traded to the New York Rangers after playing only 26 games with the Kings.
3. The Ottawa Senators' sixth-round pick went to the Carolina Hurricanes as the result of a trade on December 18, 2014, that sent Jay Harrison to Winnipeg in exchange for this pick.
  Winnipeg previously acquired this pick as the result of a trade on June 28, 2014, that sent a seventh-round pick in 2014 to Ottawa in exchange for this pick.
4. The New York Rangers' sixth-round pick went to the Anaheim Ducks as the result of a trade on June 27, 2015, that sent Emerson Etem and Florida's second-round pick in 2015 (41st overall) to New York in exchange for Carl Hagelin, a second-round pick in 2015 (59th overall) and this pick.

=== Round seven ===
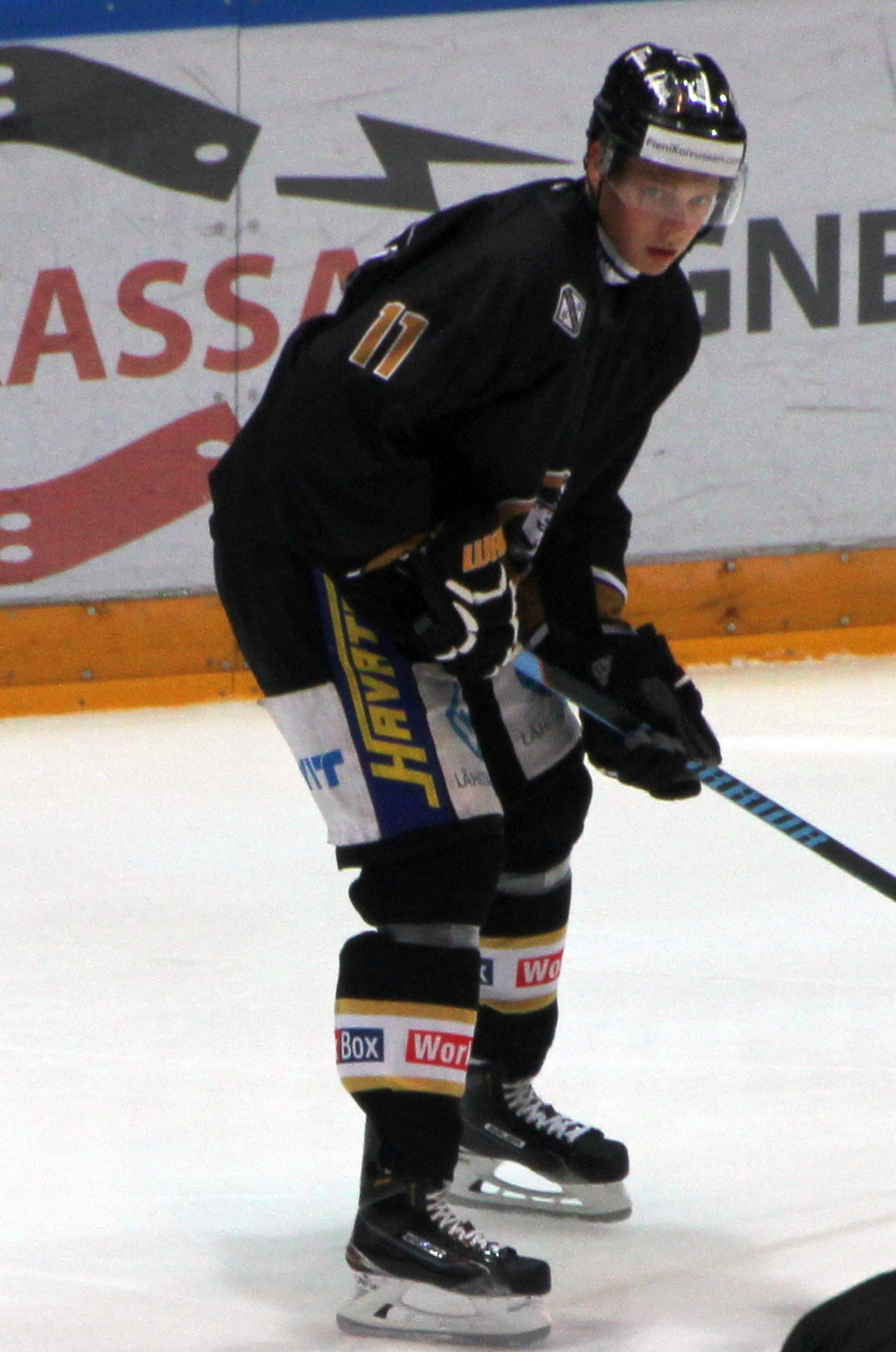
Markus Nutivaara was selected 189th overall by the Columbus Blue Jackets.

#	Player	Nationality	NHL team	College/junior/club team
182	Ivan Chukarov (D)	United States	Buffalo Sabres	Minnesota Wilderness (NAHL)
183	Erik Kallgren (G)	Sweden	Arizona Coyotes	Linkopings J20 (J20 SuperElit)
184	Adam Huska (G)	Slovakia	New York Rangers (from Edmonton)^{1}	Green Bay Gamblers (USHL)
185	Nikita Korostelev (RW)	Russia	Toronto Maple Leafs	Sarnia Sting (OHL)
186	Steven Lorentz (C/LW)	Canada	Carolina Hurricanes	Peterborough Petes (OHL)
187	Chaz Reddekopp (D)	Canada	Los Angeles Kings (from New Jersey)^{2}	Victoria Royals (WHL)
188	Ivan Fedotov (G)	Russia	Philadelphia Flyers	Reaktor (MHL)
189	Markus Nutivaara (D)	Finland	Columbus Blue Jackets	Kärpät (Liiga)
190	Marcus Vela (C)	Canada	San Jose Sharks	Langley Rivermen (BCHL)
191	Gustav Olhaver (C)	Sweden	Colorado Avalanche	Rogle BK J20 (J20 SuperElit)
192	Patrick Shea (C)	United States	Florida Panthers	Kimball Union Academy Wildcats (HS-New Hampshire)
193	Jake Kupsky (G)	United States	San Jose Sharks (from Dallas)^{3}	Lone Star Brahmas (NAHL)
194	Matt Roy (D)	United States	Los Angeles Kings	Michigan Tech Huskies (WCHA)
195	Jack Becker (C)	United States	Boston Bruins	Mahtomedi Zephyrs (HS-Minnesota)
196	Riley Bruce (D)	Canada	Calgary Flames	North Bay Battalion (OHL)
197	Nikita Pavlychev (C)	Russia	Pittsburgh Penguins	Des Moines Buccaneers (USHL)
198	Sami Niku (D)	Finland	Winnipeg Jets	JYP-Akatemia (Mestis)
199	Joey Daccord (G)	United States	Ottawa Senators	Cushing Academy Penguins (HS-Massachusetts)
200	Adam Marsh (LW)	United States	Detroit Red Wings	Saint John Sea Dogs (QMJHL)
201	Gustav Bouramman (D)	Sweden	Minnesota Wild	Sault Ste. Marie Greyhounds (OHL)
202	Petter Hansson (D)	Sweden	New York Islanders	Linkopings J20 (J20 SuperElit)
203	Matteo Gennaro (C)	Canada	Winnipeg Jets (from Washington)^{4}	Prince Albert Raiders (WHL)
204	Jack Sadek (D)	United States	Minnesota Wild (from Vancouver via Tampa Bay)^{5}	Lakeville North Panthers (HS-Minnesota)
205	Evan Smith (G)	United States	Nashville Predators	Austin Bruins (NAHL)
206	Ryan Bednard (G)	United States	Florida Panthers (from St. Louis via New Jersey)^{6}	Johnstown Tomahawks (NAHL)
207	Jeremiah Addison (LW)	Canada	Montreal Canadiens	Ottawa 67's (OHL)
208	Miroslav Svoboda (G)	Czech Republic	Edmonton Oilers (from Anaheim via Tampa Bay)^{7}	Ocelari Trinec U20 (CZE U20)
209	Ziyat Paigin (D)	Russia	Edmonton Oilers (from NY Rangers via Tampa Bay and NY Rangers)^{8}	Ak Bars Kazan (KHL)
210	Tate Olson (D)	Canada	Vancouver Canucks (from Tampa Bay via NY Islanders and San Jose)^{9}	Prince George Cougars (WHL)
211	John Dahlstrom (RW)	Sweden	Chicago Blackhawks	Frolunda HC J20 (J20 SuperElit)

Notes

1. The Edmonton Oilers' seventh-round pick went to the New York Rangers as the result of a trade on June 27, 2015, that sent Cam Talbot and a seventh-round pick in 2015 (209th overall) to Edmonton in exchange for a Montreal's second-round pick in 2015 (57th overall), Ottawa's third-round pick in 2015 (79th overall) and this pick.
2. The New Jersey Devils' seventh-round pick went to the Los Angeles Kings as the result of a trade on June 30, 2013, that sent a seventh-round pick in 2013 to New Jersey in exchange for this pick.
3. The Dallas Stars' seventh-round pick went to the San Jose Sharks as the result of a trade on June 27, 2015, that sent Antti Niemi to Dallas in exchange for this pick.
4. The Washington Capitals' seventh-round pick went to the Winnipeg Jets as the result of a trade on June 28, 2014, that sent Edward Pasquale and a sixth-round pick in 2014 to Washington in exchange for a sixth-round pick in 2014, Nashville's seventh-round pick in 2014 and this pick.
5. The Vancouver Canucks' seventh-round pick went to the Minnesota Wild as the result of a trade on June 28, 2014, that sent a third-round pick in 2014 to Tampa Bay in exchange for a third-round pick in 2014 and this pick.
  Tampa Bay previously acquired this pick as the result of a trade on June 27, 2014, that sent a second-round pick in 2014 to Vancouver in exchange for Jason Garrison, the rights to Jeff Costello and this pick.
6. The St. Louis Blues' seventh-round pick went to the Florida Panthers as the result of a trade on September 28, 2013, that sent Scott Timmins and a sixth-round pick in 2014 to New Jersey in exchange for Krys Barch and this pick.
  New Jersey previously acquired this pick as the result of a trade on March 22, 2013, that sent a conditional fourth-round pick to St. Louis in exchange for Matt D'Agostini and this pick.
7. The Anaheim Ducks' seventh-round pick went to the Edmonton Oilers as the result of a trade on June 27, 2015, that sent Dallas' seventh-round pick in 2016 to Tampa Bay in exchange for this pick.
  Tampa Bay previously acquired this pick as the result of a trade on June 29, 2014, that sent Nate Thompson to Anaheim in exchange for a fourth-round pick in 2015 and this pick.
8. The New York Rangers' seventh-round pick went to the Edmonton Oilers as the result of a trade on June 27, 2015, that sent Montreal's second-round pick in 2015 (57th overall), Ottawa's third-round pick in 2015 (79th overall) and a seventh-round pick in 2015 (184th overall) to New York in exchange for Cam Talbot and this pick.
  The Rangers previously re-acquired this pick as the result of a trade on June 1, 2015, that sent Daniel Walcott to Tampa Bay in exchange for this pick.
  Tampa Bay previously acquired this pick as the result of a trade March 5, 2014, that sent Martin St. Louis and a conditional second-round pick in 2015 to New York in exchange for Ryan Callahan, a conditional first-round pick in 2014, a first-round pick in 2015, and this pick (being conditional at the time of the trade). The condition – Tampa Bay will receive a seventh-round pick in 2015 if Callahan is re-signed by Tampa Bay for the 2014–15 NHL season – was converted on June 25, 2014, when Tampa Bay signed Callahan to a six-year contract.
9. The Tampa Bay Lightning's seventh-round pick went to the Vancouver Canucks as the result of a trade on June 27, 2015, that sent Patrick McNally to San Jose in exchange for this pick.
  San Jose previously acquired this pick as the result of a trade on March 2, 2015, that sent Tyler Kennedy to New York in exchange for this pick (being conditional at the time of the trade). The condition – San Jose will receive a seventh-round pick in 2015 if the Islanders do not win the 2015 Stanley Cup and Kennedy does not play in 50% of the Islanders playoff games – was converted on April 27, 2015, when the Islanders were eliminated from the playoffs.
  The Islanders previously acquired this pick as the result of a trade on June 28, 2014, that sent a seventh-round pick in 2014 to Tampa Bay in exchange for a seventh-round pick in 2014 and this pick.

== Draftees based on nationality ==
Rank	Country	Selections	Percent	Top selection
	North America	133	63.5%	
1	Canada	79	37.9%	Connor McDavid, 1st
2	United States	54	25.6%	Jack Eichel, 2nd
	Europe	77	36.0%	
3	Sweden	20	9.5%	Joel Eriksson Ek, 20th
4	Russia	17	8.1%	Ivan Provorov, 7th
5	Finland	13	6.2%	Mikko Rantanen, 10th
6	Czech Republic	11	5.2%	Pavel Zacha, 6th
7	Slovakia	5	2.4%	Erik Cernak, 43rd
8	Switzerland	4	1.9%	Timo Meier, 9th
9	Latvia	3	1.4%	Martins Dzierkals, 68th
10	Belarus	1	0.5%	Pavel Karnaukhov, 136th
10	Germany	1	0.5%	Frederik Tiffels, 167th
10	Italy	1	0.5%	Matthew Bradley, 131st
10	Netherlands	1	0.5%	Daniel Sprong, 46th
	Asia	1	0.5%	
10	China	1	0.5%	Andong Song, 172nd

=== North American draftees by state/province ===
Rank	State/Province	Selections	Percent	Top selection
1	Ontario	26	12.3%	Connor McDavid, 1st
2	Quebec	20	9.5%	Thomas Chabot, 18th
3	British Columbia	14	6.6%	Mathew Barzal, 16th
4	Massachusetts	12	5.7%	Jack Eichel, 2nd
5	Michigan	9	4.3%	Zach Werenski, 8th
5	Alberta	9	4.3%	Jake DeBrusk, 14th
7	Saskatchewan	7	3.3%	Jesse Gabrielle, 105th
8	Minnesota	6	2.8%	Brock Boeser, 23rd
9	New York	5	2.4%	Jordan Greenway, 50th
10	Illinois	4	1.9%	Christian Fischer, 32nd
10	Wisconsin	4	1.9%	Tommy Novak, 85th
12	Colorado	3	1.4%	Brandon Carlo, 37th
13	Missouri	2	0.9%	Chris Martenet, 103rd
13	Texas	2	0.9%	Caleb Jones, 117th
15	Ohio	1	0.5%	Jack Roslovic, 25th
15	Oregon	1	0.5%	Dennis Yan, 64th
15	Manitoba	1	0.5%	Keegan Kolesar, 69th
15	New Hampshire	1	0.5%	Mike Robinson, 86th
15	Indiana	1	0.5%	Karch Bachman, 132nd
15	Prince Edward Island	1	0.5%	Spencer Smallman, 138th
15	Georgia	1	0.5%	Chase Pearson, 140th
15	Alaska	1	0.5%	Kristian Oldham, 153rd
15	Nebraska	1	0.5%	Chris Wilkie, 162nd
15	California	1	0.5%	Tyler Moy, 175th
15	Utah	1	0.5%	Garrett Metcalf, 179th

== See also ==
- 2012–13 NHL transactions
- 2013–14 NHL transactions
- 2014–15 NHL transactions
- 2015–16 NHL transactions
- 2015–16 NHL season
- List of first overall NHL draft picks
- List of NHL players
