= Andrew MacDonald (ice hockey) =

Canadian ice hockey player

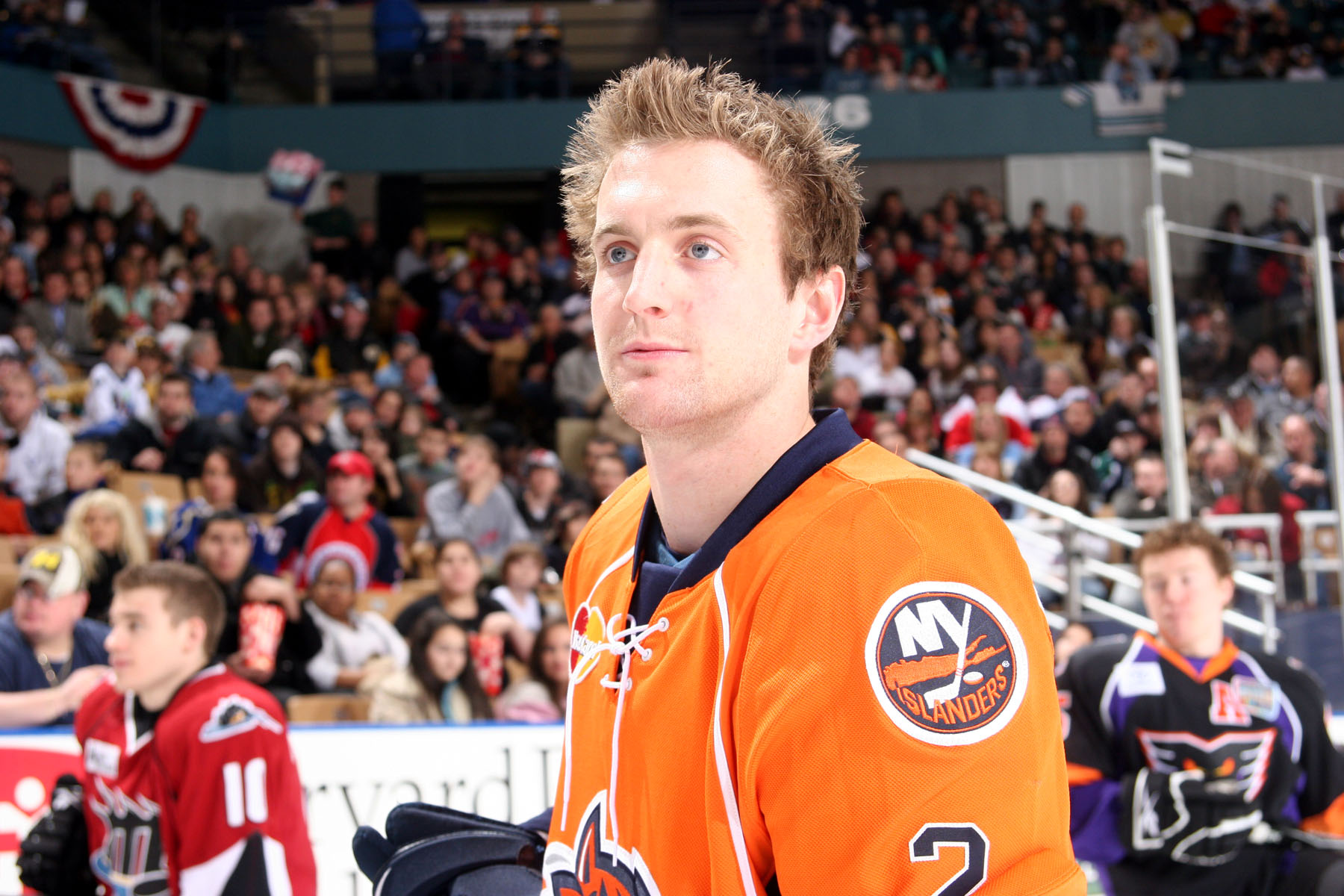
- MacDonald at the 2009 AHL All-Star Game
- Born: September 7, 1986 (age 40) Judique, Nova Scotia, Canada
- Height: 6 ft 1 in (185 cm)
- Weight: 190 lb (86 kg; 13 st 8 lb)
- Position: Defence
- Shot: Left
- Played for: New York Islanders; Energie Karlovy Vary; Philadelphia Flyers; SC Bern
- NHL draft: 160th overall, 2006; New York Islanders
- Playing career: 2007–2020

Andrew MacDonald (born September 7, 1986) is a Canadian former professional ice hockey defenceman. In the National Hockey League (NHL), he played for the New York Islanders and Philadelphia Flyers, serving as an alternate captain for both franchises.

== Playing career ==
=== Professional ===
==== New York Islanders ====
MacDonald was drafted in the sixth round, 160th overall, by the New York Islanders in the 2006 NHL entry draft. He played junior ice hockey for the Moncton Wildcats of the Quebec Major Junior Hockey League (QMJHL) where he was, along with Keith Yandle, a star defenceman on the team's 2005–06 championship team. He has also played for the Bridgeport Sound Tigers, the Islanders' American Hockey League (AHL) affiliate.

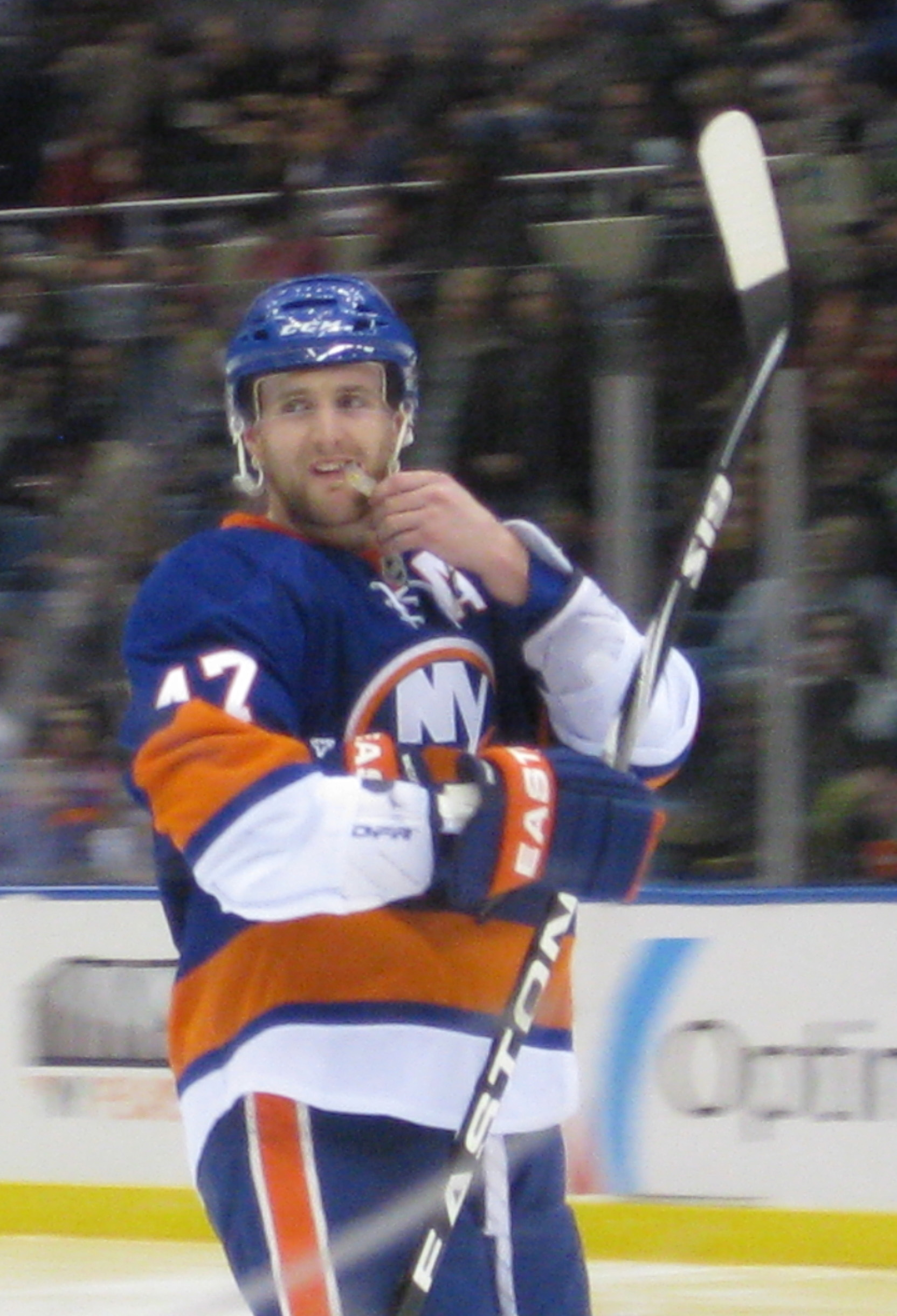
MacDonald during his tenure with the New York Islanders.

In the 2009–10 season, MacDonald scored his first NHL goal on December 17, 2009, in a 5–2 loss to the New York Rangers. On February 25, 2010, MacDonald was re-signed by the Islanders to a four-year contract extension.

==== Philadelphia Flyers ====
During the final year of his contract in the 2013–14 season, MacDonald was traded by the Islanders to the Philadelphia Flyers in exchange for Matt Mangene, a 2015 second-round pick, and a 2014 third-round pick on March 4, 2014. The Flyers signed MacDonald to a six-year, $30 million contract extension on April 15. On October 5, 2015, the Flyers put MacDonald on waivers, whom he cleared the next day and was assigned to the Flyers' AHL affiliate, the Lehigh Valley Phantoms.

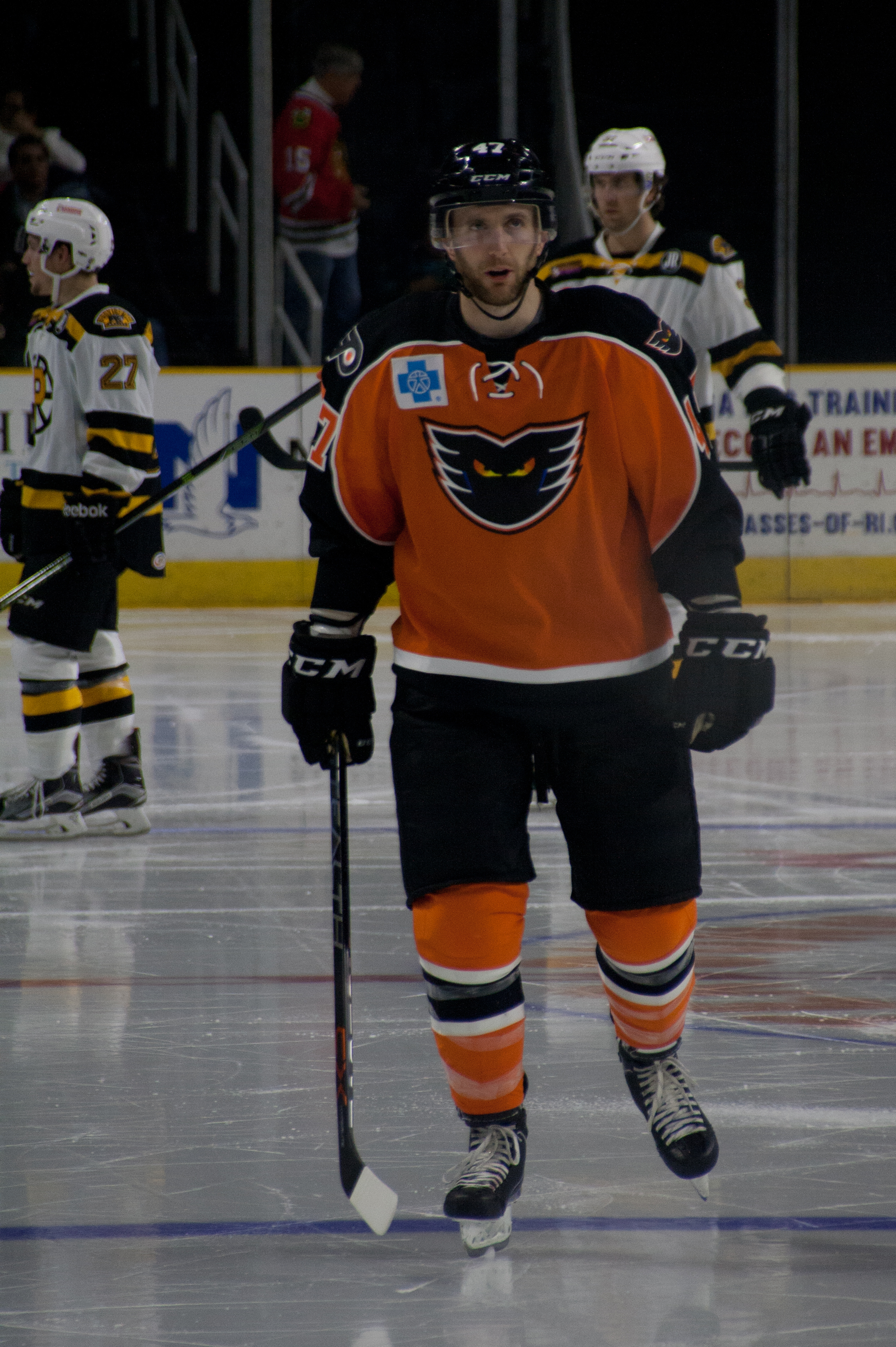
MacDonald with the Lehigh Valley Phantoms.

Prior to the 2017–18 season, on October 3, 2017, the Flyers named MacDonald an alternate captain.

During the 2018–19 season, MacDonald appeared in 47 games, producing just nine assists, as the Flyers missed the playoffs. On June 15, 2019, the Flyers placed MacDonald on unconditional waivers for the purpose of terminating his contract. He was entering the final year of his six-year contract that he signed in 2014. The move allowed him to become an unrestricted free agent on July 1.

==== Europe ====
As a free agent, MacDonald went unsigned over the following summer before agreeing to an invitation from the Calgary Flames to attend the 2019 training camp on a professional tryout (PTO) contract. MacDonald remained with the Flames through camp and preseason before he was released from his tryout on October 4, 2019.

With the 2019–20 season underway, MacDonald opted to seek a contract abroad for the first time since his stint in the Czech Republic during the 2012–13 NHL lockout. On October 21, 2019, MacDonald agreed to a one-year contract for the remainder of the season with SC Bern of Switzerland's National League. He made 15 appearances with SC Bern, but was unable to help the club qualify for the postseason. On March 3, 2020, MacDonald left the club at his own request and against the express will of SC Bern prior to their relegation series playoffs.

== Career statistics ==
			Regular season					Playoffs
Season	Team	League	GP	G	A	Pts	PIM	GP	G	A	Pts	PIM
2002–03	Cape Breton West Islanders AAA	Midget	—	—	—	—	—	—	—	—	—	—
2003–04	Truro Bearcats	MJAHL	90	8	20	28	43	10	0	0	0	—
2004–05	Truro Bearcats	MJAHL	56	11	22	33	60	17	6	7	13	—
2005–06	Moncton Wildcats	QMJHL	68	6	40	46	62	21	2	11	13	10
2006–07	Moncton Wildcats	QMJHL	65	14	44	58	81	7	1	5	6	4
2006–07	Bridgeport Sound Tigers	AHL	3	0	0	0	0	—	—	—	—	—
2007–08	Bridgeport Sound Tigers	AHL	21	2	3	5	10	—	—	—	—	—
2007–08	Utah Grizzlies	ECHL	38	1	11	12	39	15	3	9	12	12
2008–09	Bridgeport Sound Tigers	AHL	69	9	23	32	46	5	1	1	2	4
2008–09	New York Islanders	NHL	3	0	0	0	2	—	—	—	—	—
2009–10	Bridgeport Sound Tigers	AHL	21	2	6	8	29	5	3	1	4	10
2009–10	New York Islanders	NHL	46	1	6	7	20	—	—	—	—	—
2010–11	New York Islanders	NHL	60	4	23	27	37	—	—	—	—	—
2011–12	New York Islanders	NHL	75	5	14	19	26	—	—	—	—	—
2012–13	Baník Sokolov	CZE.3	1	0	0	0	0	—	—	—	—	—
2012–13	Energie Karlovy Vary	ELH	21	1	4	5	10	—	—	—	—	—
2012–13	New York Islanders	NHL	48	3	9	12	20	4	0	0	0	4
2013–14	New York Islanders	NHL	63	4	20	24	34	—	—	—	—	—
2013–14	Philadelphia Flyers	NHL	19	0	4	4	16	7	1	1	2	8
2014–15	Philadelphia Flyers	NHL	58	2	10	12	41	—	—	—	—	—
2015–16	Lehigh Valley Phantoms	AHL	43	5	31	36	30	—	—	—	—	—
2015–16	Philadelphia Flyers	NHL	28	1	7	8	6	6	1	0	1	2
2016–17	Philadelphia Flyers	NHL	73	2	16	18	26	—	—	—	—	—
2017–18	Philadelphia Flyers	NHL	66	6	15	21	30	6	2	0	2	6
2018–19	Philadelphia Flyers	NHL	47	0	9	9	18	—	—	—	—	—
2019–20	SC Bern	NL	15	0	1	1	12	—	—	—	—	—
NHL totals			586	28	133	161	276	23	4	1	5	20
