= Matt Mangene =

American professional ice hockey forward (born 1989)

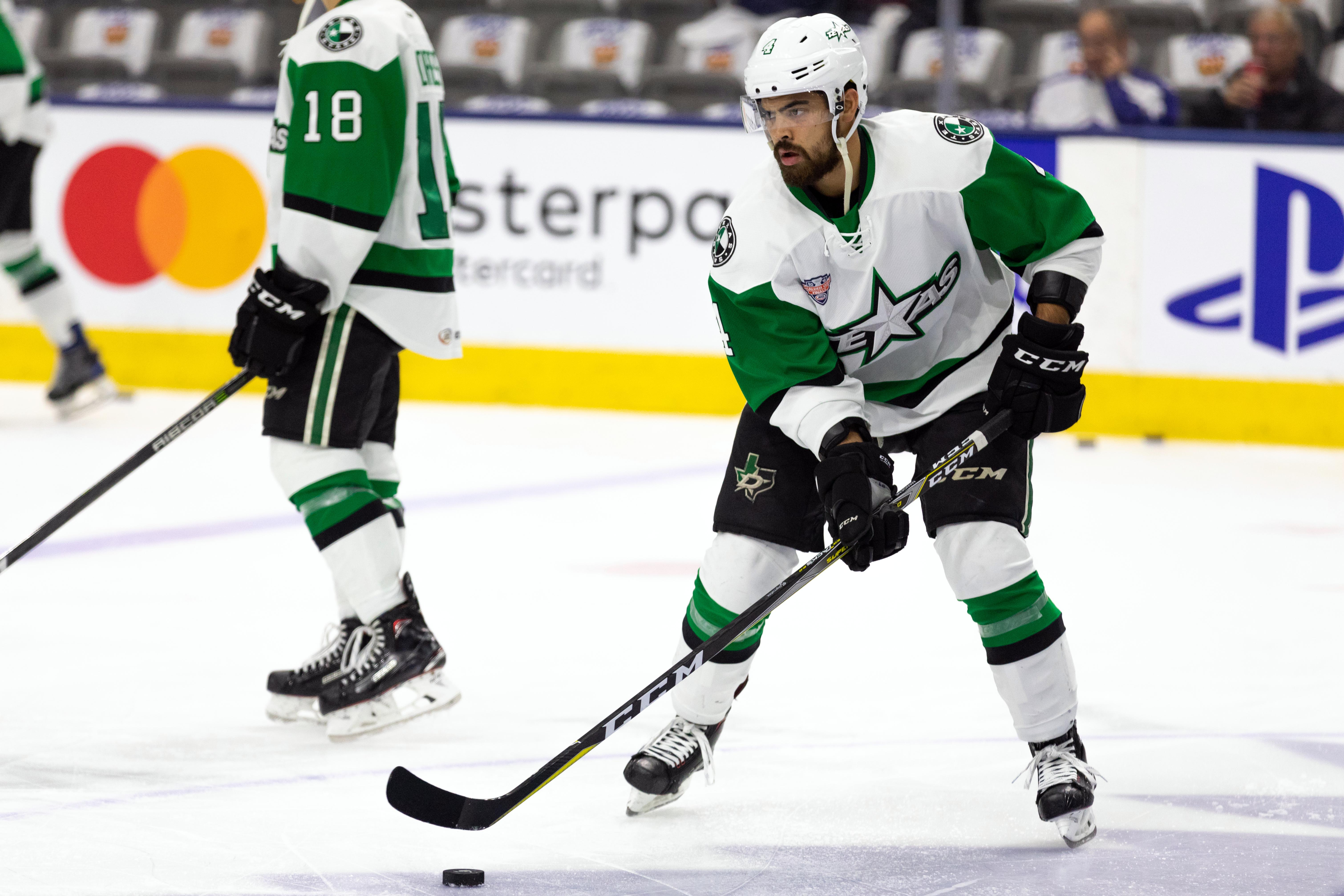
- Born: March 12, 1989 (age 37) Manorville, New York, U.S.
- Height: 5 ft 10 in (178 cm)
- Weight: 190 lb (86 kg; 13 st 8 lb)
- Position: Center
- Shoots: Right
- IceHL team Former teams: EC VSV; Adirondack Phantoms; Bridgeport Sound Tigers; Texas Stars; Springfield Thunderbirds
- NHL draft: Undrafted
- Playing career: 2012–present

Matt Mangene (born March 12, 1989) is an American professional ice hockey forward who is currently playing with EC VSV of the Austrian Hockey League (IceHL).

== Playing career ==
Before turning professional, Mangene attended the University of Maine where he played three seasons (2009–12) of NCAA college hockey with the Maine Black Bears.

On April 2, 2012, the Philadelphia Flyers of the National Hockey League signed Mangene as a free agent to a two-year entry-level contract, and he was assigned to begin his professional career with the Adirondack Phantoms of the AHL for the remaining games of the 2011–12 season.

After three seasons in the Flyers' minor league system, Mangene was traded to the New York Islanders along with a second and third-round draft pick for Andrew MacDonald on March 4, 2014. Mangene was initially assigned to the Bridgeport Sound Tigers, the Islanders' AHL affiliate. After going scoreless in 10 games, Mangene was reassigned to the Islanders' ECHL team, the Stockton Thunder. Following the end of the season, the Islanders did not make a qualifying offer to Mangene and he became an unrestricted agent on July 1, 2014.

On September 25, 2014, Mangene returned to the ECHL in signing a one-year contract with the Florida Everblades.

After establishing himself in the AHL in playing four seasons with the Texas Stars, Mangene left as a free agent following the 2017–18 season to sign a one-year contract with fellow AHL competitors, the Springfield Thunderbirds, affiliate of the Florida Panthers on July 3, 2018.

Following his ninth season in the AHL, Mangene opted to pursue a career abroad, agreeing to a one-year contract with Austrian club EC VSV of the Ice Hockey League on August 19, 2020.

== Career statistics ==
			Regular season					Playoffs
Season	Team	League	GP	G	A	Pts	PIM	GP	G	A	Pts	PIM
2007–08	South Shore Kings	EJHL	44	12	19	31	44	4	2	1	3	23
2008–09	New Hampshire Jr. Monarchs	EJHL	43	12	25	37	39	7	0	6	6	8
2009–10	University of Maine	HE	29	1	10	11	10	—	—	—	—	—
2010–11	University of Maine	HE	36	3	7	10	42	—	—	—	—	—
2011–12	University of Maine	HE	40	16	18	34	58	—	—	—	—	—
2011–12	Adirondack Phantoms	AHL	5	0	0	0	0	—	—	—	—	—
2012–13	Adirondack Phantoms	AHL	36	5	6	11	8	—	—	—	—	—
2012–13	Trenton Titans	ECHL	14	0	6	6	23	—	—	—	—	—
2013–14	Adirondack Phantoms	AHL	51	3	3	6	32	—	—	—	—	—
2013–14	Bridgeport Sound Tigers	AHL	10	0	0	0	6	—	—	—	—	—
2013–14	Stockton Thunder	ECHL	6	1	4	5	8	—	—	—	—	—
2014–15	Florida Everblades	ECHL	23	4	13	17	20	—	—	—	—	—
2014–15	Texas Stars	AHL	36	2	15	17	16	—	—	—	—	—
2015–16	Texas Stars	AHL	41	3	7	10	26	4	1	1	2	4
2016–17	Texas Stars	AHL	66	8	19	27	47	—	—	—	—	—
2017–18	Texas Stars	AHL	63	7	19	26	44	22	1	9	10	8
2018–19	Springfield Thunderbirds	AHL	62	8	24	32	34	—	—	—	—	—
2019–20	Springfield Thunderbirds	AHL	36	1	10	11	25	—	—	—	—	—
AHL totals			406	37	103	140	238	26	2	10	12	12
