= 2019–20 Calgary Flames season =

Professional ice hockey team season

2019–20 Calgary Flames
- Division: 4th Pacific
- Conference: 8th Western
- 2019–20 record: 36–27–7
- Home record: 16–13–4
- Road record: 20–14–3
- Goals for: 210
- Goals against: 215

Team information
- General manager: Brad Treliving
- Coach: Bill Peters (Oct. 3 – Nov. 29); Geoff Ward (interim, Nov. 29 – Aug. 20)
- Captain: Mark Giordano
- Alternate captains: Mikael Backlund; Sean Monahan; Matthew Tkachuk
- Arena: Scotiabank Saddledome
- Average attendance: 18,751
- Minor league affiliates: Stockton Heat (AHL); Kansas City Mavericks (ECHL)

Team leaders
- Goals: Elias Lindholm (29)
- Assists: Johnny Gaudreau (40)
- Points: Matthew Tkachuk (61)
- Penalty minutes: Matthew Tkachuk (74)
- Plus/minus: Derek Ryan (+9)
- Wins: David Rittich (24)
- Goals against average: Cam Talbot (2.63)

The 2019–20 Calgary Flames season was the Flames' 40th season in Calgary, and the 48th for the National Hockey League (NHL) franchise that was established on June 6, 1972. The Flames entered the season as the defending Pacific Division champions.

The season was suspended by the league officials on March 12, 2020, after several other professional and collegiate sports organizations followed suit as a result of the ongoing COVID-19 pandemic. On May 26, the NHL regular season was officially declared over with the remaining games being cancelled. The Flames advanced to the playoffs and defeated the Winnipeg Jets in the qualifying round in four games, but were defeated in the first round by the Dallas Stars in six games.

== Standings ==
=== Divisional standings ===
Pacific Division
Pos	Team	GP	W	L	OTL	RW	GF	GA	GD	Pts
1	Vegas Golden Knights	71	39	24	8	30	227	211	+16	86
2	Edmonton Oilers	71	37	25	9	31	225	217	+8	83
3	Calgary Flames	70	36	27	7	25	210	215	−5	79
4	Vancouver Canucks	69	36	27	6	27	228	217	+11	78
5	Arizona Coyotes	70	33	29	8	26	195	187	+8	74
6	Anaheim Ducks	71	29	33	9	20	187	226	−39	67
7	Los Angeles Kings	70	29	35	6	21	178	212	−34	64
8	San Jose Sharks	70	29	36	5	22	182	226	−44	63

Source: National Hockey League

=== Western Conference ===
Pos	Team	GP	W	L	OTL	RW	GF	GA	GD	PCT	Qualification
1	St. Louis Blues	71	42	19	10	33	225	193	+32	.662	Advance to Seeding round-robin tournament
2	Colorado Avalanche	70	42	20	8	37	237	191	+46	.657	Advance to Seeding round-robin tournament
3	Vegas Golden Knights	71	39	24	8	30	227	211	+16	.606	Advance to Seeding round-robin tournament
4	Dallas Stars	69	37	24	8	26	180	177	+3	.594	Advance to Seeding round-robin tournament
5	Edmonton Oilers	71	37	25	9	31	225	217	+8	.585	Advance to 2020 Stanley Cup playoffs qualifying round
6	Nashville Predators	69	35	26	8	28	215	217	−2	.565	Advance to 2020 Stanley Cup playoffs qualifying round
7	Vancouver Canucks	69	36	27	6	27	228	217	+11	.565	Advance to 2020 Stanley Cup playoffs qualifying round
8	Calgary Flames	70	36	27	7	25	210	215	−5	.564	Advance to 2020 Stanley Cup playoffs qualifying round
9	Winnipeg Jets	71	37	28	6	30	216	203	+13	.563	Advance to 2020 Stanley Cup playoffs qualifying round
10	Minnesota Wild	69	35	27	7	30	220	220	0	.558	Advance to 2020 Stanley Cup playoffs qualifying round
11	Arizona Coyotes	70	33	29	8	26	195	187	+8	.529	Advance to 2020 Stanley Cup playoffs qualifying round
12	Chicago Blackhawks	70	32	30	8	23	212	218	−6	.514	Advance to 2020 Stanley Cup playoffs qualifying round
13	Anaheim Ducks	71	29	33	9	20	187	226	−39	.472	
14	Los Angeles Kings	70	29	35	6	21	178	212	−34	.457	
15	San Jose Sharks	70	29	36	5	22	182	226	−44	.450	

Source: National Hockey League

Tiebreaking procedures

1. Fewer number of games played (only used during regular season).
2. Greater number of regulation wins (denoted by RW).
3. Greater number of wins in regulation and overtime (excluding shootout wins; denoted by ROW).
4. Greater number of total wins (including shootouts).
5. Greater number of points earned in head-to-head play; if teams played an uneven number of head-to-head games, the result of the first game on the home ice of the team with the extra home game is discarded.
6. Greater goal differential (difference between goals for and goals against).
7. Greater number of goals scored (denoted by GF).

== Schedule and results ==
=== Preseason ===
The preseason schedule was published on June 18, 2019.

2019 preseason game log: 4–3–1 (Home: 3–0–1; Road: 1–3–0)
#	Date	Visitor	Score	Home	OT	Decision	Attendance	Record	Recap
1^{[A]}	September 16	Vancouver	3–2	Calgary	OT	Talbot	17,465	0–0–1
2^{[A]}^{[a]}	September 16	Calgary	4–3	Vancouver		Parsons	7,006	1–0–1
3	September 18	San Jose	4–6	Calgary		Gillies	17,348	2–0–1
4	September 20	Calgary	2–6	Edmonton		Gillies	17,592	2–1–1
5	September 22	Calgary	1–4	Winnipeg		Talbot	15,325	2–2–1
6	September 24	Winnipeg	0–2	Calgary		Rittich	—	3–2–1
7	September 26	Calgary	1–4	San Jose		Zagidulin	12,433	3–3–1
8	September 28	Edmonton	2–3	Calgary		Rittich	18,896	4–3–1
Notes:^{A} Indicates split-squad.^{a} Game was played at Save-On-Foods Memorial Centre in Victoria, British Columbia

=== Regular season ===
The regular season schedule was published on June 25, 2019.

2019–20 game log

October: 7–6–2 (Home: 4–1–1; Road: 3–5–1)
#	Date	Visitor	Score	Home	OT	Decision	Attendance	Record	Pts	Recap
1	October 3	Calgary	3–5	Colorado		Rittich	18,016	0–1–0	0
2	October 5	Vancouver	0–3	Calgary		Rittich	19,005	1–1–0	2
3	October 8	Los Angeles	4–3	Calgary	OT	Rittich	18,150	1–1–1	3
4	October 10	Calgary	3–2	Dallas	SO	Rittich	17,989	2–1–1	5
5	October 12	Calgary	2–6	Vegas		Rittich	18,192	2–2–1	5
6	October 13	Calgary	1–3	San Jose		Talbot	16,250	2–3–1	5
7	October 15	Philadelphia	1–3	Calgary		Rittich	17,771	3–3–1	7
8	October 17	Detroit	1–5	Calgary		Rittich	18,232	4–3–1	9
9	October 19	Calgary	1–4	Los Angeles		Rittich	18,230	4–4–1	9
10	October 20	Calgary	2–1	Anaheim		Talbot	15,690	5–4–1	11
11	October 22	Washington	5–3	Calgary		Talbot	18,002	5–5–1	11
12	October 24	Florida	5–6	Calgary	SO	Rittich	18,011	6–5–1	13
13	October 26	Calgary	1–2	Winnipeg	OT	Rittich	33,518 (outdoors)	6–5–2	14
14	October 29	Calgary	1–2	Carolina		Rittich	13,864	6–6–2	14
15	October 31	Calgary	6–5	Nashville	OT	Rittich	17,351	7–6–2	16

November: 6–6–2 (Home: 3–2–1; Road: 3–4–1)
#	Date	Visitor	Score	Home	OT	Decision	Attendance	Record	Pts	Recap
16	November 2	Calgary	3–0	Columbus		Rittich	13,618	8–6–2	18
17	November 3	Calgary	2–4	Washington		Talbot	18,573	8–7–2	18
18	November 5	Arizona	3–4	Calgary	OT	Rittich	17,824	9–7–2	20
19	November 7	New Jersey	2–5	Calgary		Rittich	18,851	10–7–2	22
20	November 9	St. Louis	3–2	Calgary	OT	Rittich	19,289	10–7–3	23
21	November 13	Dallas	3–1	Calgary		Talbot	18,257	10–8–3	23
22	November 16	Calgary	0–3	Arizona		Rittich	13,534	10–9–3	23
23	November 17	Calgary	0–6	Vegas		Talbot	18,083	10–10–3	23
24	November 19	Colorado	3–2	Calgary		Rittich	18,698	10–11–3	23
25	November 21	Calgary	0–5	St. Louis		Rittich	18,096	10–12–3	23
26	November 23	Calgary	3–2	Philadelphia	SO	Rittich	17,198	11–12–3	25
27	November 25	Calgary	2–3	Pittsburgh	OT	Rittich	18,437	11–12–4	26
28	November 27	Calgary	3–2	Buffalo	OT	Rittich	17,485	12–12–4	28
29	November 30	Ottawa	1–3	Calgary		Rittich	18,919	13–12–4	30

December: 7–5–1 (Home: 3–4–1; Road: 4–1–0)
#	Date	Visitor	Score	Home	OT	Decision	Attendance	Record	Pts	Recap
30	December 5	Buffalo	3–4	Calgary		Rittich	18,085	14–12–4	32
31	December 7	Los Angeles	3–4	Calgary		Talbot	19,080	15–12–4	34
32	December 9	Calgary	5–4	Colorado	OT	Rittich	17,588	16–12–4	36
33	December 10	Calgary	5–2	Arizona		Talbot	11,198	17–12–4	38
34	December 12	Toronto	2–4	Calgary		Rittich	19,289	18–12–4	40
35	December 14	Carolina	4–0	Calgary		Rittich	18,853	18–13–4	40
36	December 17	Pittsburgh	4–1	Calgary		Talbot	18,412	18–14–4	40
37	December 19	Montreal	4–3	Calgary	OT	Rittich	19,172	18–14–5	41
38	December 22	Calgary	5–1	Dallas		Rittich	18,532	19–14–5	43
39	December 23	Calgary	0–3	Minnesota		Talbot	17,596	19–15–5	43
40	December 27	Calgary	5–1	Edmonton		Rittich	18,347	20–15–5	45
41	December 29	Vancouver	5–2	Calgary		Rittich	19,289	20–16–5	45
42	December 31	Chicago	5–3	Calgary		Rittich	19,289	20–17–5	45

January: 7–2–1 (Home: 3–0–1; Road: 4–2–0)
#	Date	Visitor	Score	Home	OT	Decision	Attendance	Record	Pts	Recap
43	January 2	NY Rangers	3–4	Calgary		Talbot	19,038	21–17–5	47
44	January 5	Calgary	5–4	Minnesota	SO	Rittich	17,204	22–17–5	49
45	January 7	Calgary	2–1	Chicago		Talbot	21,274	23–17–5	51
46	January 9	Minnesota	1–2	Calgary		Talbot	18,634	24–17–5	53
47	January 11	Edmonton	3–4	Calgary		Talbot	19,289	25–17–5	55
48	January 13	Calgary	0–2	Montreal		Rittich	20,790	25–18–5	55
49	January 16	Calgary	2–1	Toronto	SO	Rittich	19,462	26–18–5	57
50	January 18	Calgary	2–5	Ottawa		Rittich	17,671	26–19–5	57
January 23–26		All-Star Break in St. Louis, Missouri
51	January 28	St. Louis	5–4	Calgary	SO	Talbot	19,033	26–19–6	58
52	January 29	Calgary	4–3	Edmonton	SO	Rittich	18,347	27–19–6	60

February: 6–7–1 (Home: 1–5–0; Road: 5–2–1)
#	Date	Visitor	Score	Home	OT	Decision	Attendance	Record	Pts	Recap
53	February 1	Edmonton	8–3	Calgary		Rittich	19,289	27–20–6	60
54	February 4	San Jose	3–1	Calgary		Rittich	18,131	27–21–6	60
55	February 6	Nashville	3–2	Calgary		Talbot	18,512	27–22–6	60
56	February 8	Calgary	6–2	Vancouver		Rittich	18,871	28–22–6	62
57	February 10	Calgary	6–2	San Jose		Rittich	17,101	29–22–6	64
58	February 12	Calgary	3–5	Los Angeles		Rittich	18,230	29–23–6	64
59	February 13	Calgary	6–0	Anaheim		Talbot	16,212	30–23–6	66
60	February 15	Chicago	8–4	Calgary		Talbot	19,231	30–24–6	66
61	February 17	Anaheim	4–6	Calgary		Talbot	19,116	31–24–6	68
62	February 21	Boston	4–3	Calgary		Talbot	19,289	31–25–6	68
63	February 23	Calgary	4–2	Detroit		Rittich	18,022	32–25–6	70
64	February 25	Calgary	5–2	Boston		Rittich	17,850	33–25–6	72
65	February 27	Calgary	3–4	Nashville	OT	Rittich	17,350	33–25–7	73
66	February 29	Calgary	3–4	Tampa Bay		Rittich	19,092	33–26–7	73

March: 3–1–0 (Home: 2–1–0; Road: 1–0–0)
#	Date	Visitor	Score	Home	OT	Decision	Attendance	Record	Pts	Recap
67	March 1	Calgary	3–0	Florida		Talbot	14,104	34–26–7	75
68	March 4	Columbus	2–3	Calgary	OT	Talbot	18,696	35–26–7	77
69	March 6	Arizona	2–3	Calgary		Talbot	19,206	36–26–7	79
70	March 8	Vegas	5–3	Calgary		Rittich	18,841	36–27–7	79

Cancelled games
#	Date	Visitor	Home
71	March 12	NY Islanders	Calgary
72	March 14	Winnipeg	Calgary
73	March 16	Calgary	NY Rangers
74	March 17	Calgary	NY Islanders
75	March 19	Calgary	New Jersey
76	March 21	Tampa Bay	Calgary
77	March 23	San Jose	Calgary
78	March 25	Anaheim	Calgary
79	March 27	Calgary	Vancouver
80	March 31	Winnipeg	Calgary
81	April 2	Vegas	Calgary
82	April 4	Edmonton	Calgary

Legend: Win (2 points) Loss (0 points) Overtime/shootout loss (1 point)

=== Playoffs ===
The Flames faced Winnipeg Jets in the qualifying round, defeating them in four games.

The Flames faced the Dallas Stars in the first round, but were defeated in six games.

2020 Stanley Cup playoffs

Western Conference Qualifying Round vs. (9) Winnipeg Jets: Calgary won 3–1
#	Date	Visitor	Score	Home	OT	Decision	Series	Recap
1	August 1	Winnipeg	1–4	Calgary		Talbot	1–0
2	August 3	Winnipeg	3–2	Calgary		Talbot	1–1
3	August 4	Calgary	6–2	Winnipeg		Talbot	2–1
4	August 6	Calgary	4–0	Winnipeg		Talbot	3–1

Western Conference First Round vs. (3) Dallas Stars: Dallas won 4–2
#	Date	Visitor	Score	Home	OT	Decision	Series	Recap
1	August 11	Calgary	3–2	Dallas		Talbot	1–0
2	August 13	Calgary	4–5	Dallas		Talbot	1–1
3	August 14	Dallas	0–2	Calgary		Talbot	2–1
4	August 16	Dallas	5–4	Calgary	OT	Talbot	2–2
5	August 18	Calgary	1–2	Dallas		Talbot	2–3
6	August 20	Dallas	7–3	Calgary		Rittich	2–4

Legend: Win Loss

== Player statistics ==
=== Skaters ===
Regular season
Player	GP	G	A	Pts	+/−	PIM
Matthew Tkachuk	69	23	38	61	−5	74
Johnny Gaudreau	70	18	40	58	−10	12
Elias Lindholm	70	29	25	54	−8	22
Sean Monahan	70	22	26	48	−16	25
Mikael Backlund	70	16	29	45	3	26
Andrew Mangiapane	68	17	15	32	4	18
Mark Giordano	60	5	26	31	2	34
Derek Ryan	68	10	19	29	9	10
Noah Hanifin	70	5	17	22	−12	12
Rasmus Andersson	70	5	17	22	−7	57
Milan Lucic	68	8	12	20	−6	54
T. J. Brodie	64	4	15	19	7	36
Dillon Dube	45	6	10	16	0	6
Sam Bennett	52	8	4	12	−1	36
Travis Hamonic	50	3	9	12	−3	27
Michael Frolik^{‡}	38	5	5	10	−10	24
Tobias Rieder	55	4	6	10	−12	6
Mark Jankowski	56	5	2	7	−12	14
Oliver Kylington	48	2	5	7	−6	16
Michael Stone	33	2	5	7	−5	16
Zac Rinaldo	19	3	2	5	−1	34
Austin Czarnik	8	2	1	3	1	0
Erik Gustafsson^{†}	7	0	3	3	−1	2
Alan Quine	9	1	0	1	−1	4
Buddy Robinson	5	1	0	1	0	7
Derek Forbort^{†}	7	0	0	0	−1	0
Alexander Yelesin	4	0	0	0	0	0
Brandon Davidson^{‡}	7	0	0	0	−2	0

Playoffs
Player	GP	G	A	Pts	+/−	PIM
Sam Bennett	10	5	3	8	4	10
Sean Monahan	10	2	6	8	0	2
Johnny Gaudreau	10	4	3	7	0	0
Mikael Backlund	10	4	2	6	−2	8
Elias Lindholm	10	2	4	6	1	2
Milan Lucic	10	1	5	6	2	17
Dillon Dube	10	4	1	5	1	2
Rasmus Andersson	10	3	2	5	4	6
Tobias Rieder	10	3	2	5	−2	0
Andrew Mangiapane	10	2	3	5	−2	6
T.J. Brodie	10	1	3	4	0	6
Erik Gustafsson	10	0	4	4	1	2
Noah Hanifin	10	0	4	4	2	0
Mark Giordano	10	0	3	3	−1	12
Derek Forbort	10	1	1	2	−1	2
Matthew Tkachuk	6	1	1	2	1	10
Derek Ryan	10	0	2	2	3	0
Alan Quine	3	0	1	1	1	0
Buddy Robinson	1	0	0	0	0	0
Mark Jankowski	5	0	0	0	−1	0
Zac Rinaldo	5	0	0	0	0	4

=== Goaltenders ===
Regular season
Player	GP	GS	TOI	W	L	OT	GA	GAA	SA	SV%	SO	G	A	PIM
David Rittich	48	48	2,791:58	24	17	6	138	2.97	1,478	.907	2	0	1	6
Cam Talbot	26	22	1,434:39	12	10	1	63	2.63	780	.919	2	0	0	21

Playoffs
Player	GP	GS	TOI	W	L	GA	GAA	SA	SV%	SO	G	A	PIM
Cam Talbot	10	10	595:33	5	4	24	2.42	316	.924	2	0	0	2
David Rittich	1	0	16:35	0	1	3	10.85	9	.667	0	0	0	0

^{†}Denotes player spent time with another team before joining the Flames. Stats reflect time with the Flames only.
^{‡}Denotes player was traded mid-season. Stats reflect time with the Flames only.
Bold/italics denotes franchise record.
