= 2019–20 Los Angeles Kings season =

Professional ice hockey team season

2019–20 Los Angeles Kings
- Division: 7th Pacific
- Conference: 14th Western
- 2019–20 record: 29–35–6
- Home record: 19–13–2
- Road record: 10–22–4
- Goals for: 178
- Goals against: 212

Team information
- General manager: Rob Blake
- Coach: Todd McLellan
- Captain: Anze Kopitar
- Alternate captains: Jeff Carter; Drew Doughty
- Arena: Staples Center
- Average attendance: 16,916
- Minor league affiliate: Ontario Reign (AHL)

Team leaders
- Goals: Anze Kopitar (21)
- Assists: Anze Kopitar (41)
- Points: Anze Kopitar (62)
- Penalty minutes: Kurtis MacDermid (47)
- Plus/minus: Matt Roy (+16)
- Wins: Jonathan Quick (16)
- Goals against average: Cal Petersen (2.64)

The 2019–20 Los Angeles Kings season was the 53rd season (52nd season of play) for the National Hockey League (NHL) franchise that was established on June 5, 1967.

The season was suspended by the league officials on March 12, 2020, after several other professional and collegiate sports organizations followed suit as a result of the ongoing COVID-19 pandemic. On May 26, the NHL regular season was officially declared over with the remaining games being cancelled. The Kings missed the playoffs for the second consecutive season. This is the first time since the 2008–09 season that the Kings missed the playoffs for consecutive years, despite the fact that the Kings went on a 10–2–1 run in their final 13 games and ended the season on a 7-game winning streak, as well as the fact that 24 teams made the playoffs due to the rest of the regular season being cancelled.

== Standings ==
=== Divisional standings ===
Pacific Division
Pos	Team	GP	W	L	OTL	RW	GF	GA	GD	Pts
1	Vegas Golden Knights	71	39	24	8	30	227	211	+16	86
2	Edmonton Oilers	71	37	25	9	31	225	217	+8	83
3	Calgary Flames	70	36	27	7	25	210	215	−5	79
4	Vancouver Canucks	69	36	27	6	27	228	217	+11	78
5	Arizona Coyotes	70	33	29	8	26	195	187	+8	74
6	Anaheim Ducks	71	29	33	9	20	187	226	−39	67
7	Los Angeles Kings	70	29	35	6	21	178	212	−34	64
8	San Jose Sharks	70	29	36	5	22	182	226	−44	63

Source: National Hockey League

=== Western Conference ===
Pos	Team	GP	W	L	OTL	RW	GF	GA	GD	PCT	Qualification
1	St. Louis Blues	71	42	19	10	33	225	193	+32	.662	Advance to Seeding round-robin tournament
2	Colorado Avalanche	70	42	20	8	37	237	191	+46	.657	Advance to Seeding round-robin tournament
3	Vegas Golden Knights	71	39	24	8	30	227	211	+16	.606	Advance to Seeding round-robin tournament
4	Dallas Stars	69	37	24	8	26	180	177	+3	.594	Advance to Seeding round-robin tournament
5	Edmonton Oilers	71	37	25	9	31	225	217	+8	.585	Advance to 2020 Stanley Cup playoffs qualifying round
6	Nashville Predators	69	35	26	8	28	215	217	−2	.565	Advance to 2020 Stanley Cup playoffs qualifying round
7	Vancouver Canucks	69	36	27	6	27	228	217	+11	.565	Advance to 2020 Stanley Cup playoffs qualifying round
8	Calgary Flames	70	36	27	7	25	210	215	−5	.564	Advance to 2020 Stanley Cup playoffs qualifying round
9	Winnipeg Jets	71	37	28	6	30	216	203	+13	.563	Advance to 2020 Stanley Cup playoffs qualifying round
10	Minnesota Wild	69	35	27	7	30	220	220	0	.558	Advance to 2020 Stanley Cup playoffs qualifying round
11	Arizona Coyotes	70	33	29	8	26	195	187	+8	.529	Advance to 2020 Stanley Cup playoffs qualifying round
12	Chicago Blackhawks	70	32	30	8	23	212	218	−6	.514	Advance to 2020 Stanley Cup playoffs qualifying round
13	Anaheim Ducks	71	29	33	9	20	187	226	−39	.472	
14	Los Angeles Kings	70	29	35	6	21	178	212	−34	.457	
15	San Jose Sharks	70	29	36	5	22	182	226	−44	.450	

Source: National Hockey League

Tiebreaking procedures

1. Fewer number of games played (only used during regular season).
2. Greater number of regulation wins (denoted by RW).
3. Greater number of wins in regulation and overtime (excluding shootout wins; denoted by ROW).
4. Greater number of total wins (including shootouts).
5. Greater number of points earned in head-to-head play; if teams played an uneven number of head-to-head games, the result of the first game on the home ice of the team with the extra home game is discarded.
6. Greater goal differential (difference between goals for and goals against).
7. Greater number of goals scored (denoted by GF).

== Schedule and results ==
=== Preseason ===
The preseason schedule was published on June 13, 2019.

2019 preseason game log: 4–2–1 (Home: 2–1–1; Road: 2–1–0)
#	Date	Visitor	Score	Home	OT	Decision	Attendance	Record	Recap
1^{[A]}	September 17	Los Angeles	4–1	Arizona		Campbell	—	1–0–0
2^{[A]}	September 17	Arizona	5–0	Los Angeles		Quick	8,133	1–1–0
3	September 19	Vegas	3–2	Los Angeles	OT	Quick	10,421	1–1–1
4^{[a]}	September 21	Vancouver	5–7	Los Angeles		Campbell	10,014	2–1–1
5	September 23	Anaheim	0–3	Los Angeles		Petersen	12,746	3–1–1
6	September 25	Los Angeles	0–2	Anaheim		Quick	12,410	3–2–1
7	September 27	Los Angeles	3–2	Vegas		Quick	18,103	4–2–1
Notes:^{A} Indicates split-squad.^{a} Game was played at Vivint Smart Home Arena in Salt Lake City, Utah.

=== Regular season ===
The regular season schedule was published on June 25, 2019.

2019–20 game log

October: 4–9–0 (Home: 2–4–0; Road: 2–5–0)
#	Date	Visitor	Score	Home	OT	Decision	Attendance	Record	Pts	Recap
1	October 5	Los Angeles	5–6	Edmonton		Quick	18,347	0–1–0	0
2	October 8	Los Angeles	4–3	Calgary	OT	Campbell	18,150	1–1–0	2
3	October 9	Los Angeles	2–8	Vancouver		Quick	18,955	1–2–0	2
4	October 12	Nashville	4–7	Los Angeles		Campbell	18,230	2–2–0	4
5	October 13	Vegas	5–2	Los Angeles		Quick	17,699	2–3–0	4
6	October 15	Carolina	2–0	Los Angeles		Campbell	14,219	2–4–0	4
7	October 17	Buffalo	3–0	Los Angeles		Campbell	17,605	2–5–0	4
8	October 19	Calgary	1–4	Los Angeles		Quick	18,230	3–5–0	6
9	October 22	Los Angeles	3–2	Winnipeg		Quick	15,325	4–5–0	8
10	October 24	Los Angeles	2–5	St. Louis		Quick	18,096	4–6–0	8
11	October 26	Los Angeles	1–5	Minnesota		Quick	17,444	4–7–0	8
12	October 27	Los Angeles	1–5	Chicago		Campbell	21,334	4–8–0	8
13	October 30	Vancouver	5–3	Los Angeles		Quick	15,565	4–9–0	8

November: 7–5–2 (Home: 7–1–1; Road: 0–4–1)
#	Date	Visitor	Score	Home	OT	Decision	Attendance	Record	Pts	Recap
14	November 2	Chicago	3–4	Los Angeles	OT	Campbell	18,230	5–9–0	10
15	November 5	Los Angeles	1–3	Toronto		Quick	19,195	5–10–0	10
16	November 7	Los Angeles	2–3	Ottawa	OT	Campbell	9,929	5–10–1	11
17	November 9	Los Angeles	2–3	Montreal		Quick	21,302	5–11–1	11
18	November 12	Minnesota	1–3	Los Angeles		Quick	16,099	6–11–1	13
19	November 14	Detroit	2–3	Los Angeles	OT	Quick	16,871	7–11–1	15
20	November 16	Vegas	3–4	Los Angeles		Quick	17,282	8–11–1	17
21	November 18	Los Angeles	0–3	Arizona		Campbell	12,210	8–12–1	17
22	November 21	Edmonton	1–5	Los Angeles		Quick	15,539	9–12–1	19
23	November 23	Arizona	3–2	Los Angeles		Quick	15,912	9–13–1	19
24	November 25	San Jose	4–3	Los Angeles	OT	Quick	16,927	9–13–2	20
25	November 27	NY Islanders	1–4	Los Angeles		Quick	16,082	10–13–2	22
26	November 29	Los Angeles	1–4	San Jose		Quick	16,893	10–14–2	22
27	November 30	Winnipeg	1–2	Los Angeles		Campbell	17,249	11–14–2	24

December: 6–7–2 (Home: 2–2–0; Road: 4–5–2)
#	Date	Visitor	Score	Home	OT	Decision	Attendance	Record	Pts	Recap
28	December 2	Los Angeles	2–4	Anaheim		Campbell	15,434	11–15–2	24
29	December 4	Washington	3–1	Los Angeles		Quick	16,102	11–16–2	24
30	December 6	Los Angeles	1–2	Edmonton		Quick	17,044	11–17–2	24
31	December 7	Los Angeles	3–4	Calgary		Campbell	19,080	11–18–2	24
32	December 10	NY Rangers	1–3	Los Angeles		Quick	17,826	12–18–2	26
33	December 12	Los Angeles	2–1	Anaheim		Quick	16,008	13–18–2	28
34	December 14	Los Angeles	4–5	Pittsburgh	SO	Quick	18,581	13–18–3	29
35	December 15	Los Angeles	4–2	Detroit		Campbell	18,540	14–18–3	31
36	December 17	Los Angeles	4–3	Boston	OT	Quick	17,850	15–18–3	33
37	December 19	Los Angeles	2–3	Columbus	OT	Campbell	17,117	15–18–4	34
38	December 21	Los Angeles	2–3	Buffalo		Quick	17,484	15–19–4	34
39	December 23	St. Louis	4–1	Los Angeles		Quick	18,230	15–20–4	34
40	December 27	Los Angeles	3–2	San Jose	OT	Campbell	16,610	16–20–4	36
41	December 28	Los Angeles	2–3	Vancouver		Quick	18,837	16–21–4	36
42	December 31	Philadelphia	3–5	Los Angeles		Quick	17,982	17–21–4	38

January: 2–7–1 (Home: 0–4–0; Road: 2–3–1)
#	Date	Visitor	Score	Home	OT	Decision	Attendance	Record	Pts	Recap
43	January 4	Nashville	4–1	Los Angeles		Campbell	18,230	17–22–4	38
44	January 6	Columbus	4–2	Los Angeles		Quick	14,964	17–23–4	38
45	January 8	Dallas	2–1	Los Angeles		Quick	17,129	17–24–4	38
46	January 9	Los Angeles	5–2	Vegas		Campbell	18,281	18–24–4	40
47	January 11	Los Angeles	0–2	Carolina		Campbell	18,680	18–25–4	40
48	January 14	Los Angeles	3–4	Tampa Bay	SO	Quick	19,092	18–25–5	41
49	January 16	Los Angeles	3–4	Florida		Campbell	12,575	18–26–5	41
50	January 18	Los Angeles	1–4	Philadelphia		Campbell	19,602	18–27–5	41
51	January 29	Tampa Bay	4–2	Los Angeles		Quick	18,230	18–28–5	41
52	January 30	Los Angeles	3–2	Arizona	OT	Campbell	13,346	19–28–5	43

February: 5–7–1 (Home: 4–2–1; Road: 1–5–0)
#	Date	Visitor	Score	Home	OT	Decision	Attendance	Record	Pts	Recap
53	February 1	Anaheim	3–1	Los Angeles		Quick	18,230	19–29–5	43
54	February 4	Los Angeles	2–4	Washington		Quick	18,573	19–30–5	43
55	February 6	Los Angeles	3–5	NY Islanders		Quick	11,108	19–31–5	43
56	February 8	Los Angeles	0–3	New Jersey		Petersen	16,514	19–32–5	43
57	February 9	Los Angeles	1–4	NY Rangers		Quick	17,237	19–33–5	43
58	February 12	Calgary	3–5	Los Angeles		Petersen	18,230	20–33–5	45
59	February 15	Los Angeles	3–1	Colorado		Quick	43,574 (outdoors)	21–33–5	47
60	February 18	Los Angeles	3–6	Winnipeg		Petersen	15,325	21–34–5	47
61	February 20	Florida	4–5	Los Angeles		Quick	16,911	22–34–5	49
62	February 22	Colorado	2–1	Los Angeles	SO	Quick	18,230	22–34–6	50
63	February 23	Edmonton	4–2	Los Angeles		Petersen	18,230	22–35–6	50
64	February 26	Pittsburgh	1–2	Los Angeles		Petersen	16,898	23–35–6	52
65	February 29	New Jersey	1–2	Los Angeles	OT	Quick	17,372	24–35–6	54

March: 5–0–0 (Home: 4–0–0; Road: 1–0–0)
#	Date	Visitor	Score	Home	OT	Decision	Attendance	Record	Pts	Recap
66	March 1	Los Angeles	4–1	Vegas		Petersen	18,419	25–35–6	56
67	March 5	Toronto	0–1	Los Angeles	SO	Quick	17,495	26–35–6	58
68	March 7	Minnesota	3–7	Los Angeles		Petersen	16,082	27–35–6	60
69	March 9	Colorado	1–3	Los Angeles		Quick	15,011	28–35–6	62
70	March 11	Ottawa	2–3	Los Angeles		Petersen	12,030	29–35–6	64

Cancelled games
#	Date	Visitor	Home
71	March 14	Anaheim	Los Angeles
72	March 17	Montreal	Los Angeles
73	March 19	Boston	Los Angeles
74	March 21	Vancouver	Los Angeles
75	March 22	Arizona	Los Angeles
76	March 24	Los Angeles	Dallas
77	March 26	Los Angeles	Nashville
78	March 27	Los Angeles	St. Louis
79	March 29	Los Angeles	Chicago
80	March 31	San Jose	Los Angeles
81	April 3	Los Angeles	Anaheim
82	April 4	Dallas	Los Angeles

Legend: Win (2 points) Loss (0 points) Overtime/shootout loss (1 point)

== Player statistics ==
=== Skaters ===
Regular season
Player	GP	G	A	Pts	+/−	PIM
Anze Kopitar	70	21	41	62	6	16
Alex Iafallo	70	17	26	43	1	14
Dustin Brown	66	17	18	35	−1	22
Drew Doughty	67	7	28	35	−16	36
Tyler Toffoli^{‡}	58	18	16	34	−4	16
Adrian Kempe	69	11	21	32	−10	29
Jeff Carter	60	17	10	27	−21	36
Sean Walker	70	5	19	24	−12	26
Blake Lizotte	65	6	17	23	−4	20
Matt Roy	70	4	14	18	16	10
Michael Amadio	68	6	10	16	−11	10
Ben Hutton	65	4	12	16	5	14
Kyle Clifford^{‡}	53	6	8	14	−6	45
Nikolai Prokhorkin	43	4	10	14	−6	6
Trevor Lewis	56	6	6	12	−7	16
Austin Wagner	65	6	5	11	−5	39
Ilya Kovalchuk	17	3	6	9	−10	12
Martin Frk	17	6	2	8	−1	4
Kurtis MacDermid	45	3	5	8	−9	47
Alec Martinez^{‡}	41	1	7	8	−9	17
Gabriel Vilardi	10	3	4	7	0	4
Trevor Moore^{†}	15	3	2	5	−1	2
Joakim Ryan	35	1	4	5	−10	10
Matt Luff	18	1	4	5	−5	2
Carl Grundstrom	13	0	4	4	2	8
Mikey Anderson	6	1	0	1	4	0
Derek Forbort^{‡}	13	0	1	1	−4	4
Paul LaDue	2	0	1	1	0	0
Jaret Anderson-Dolan	4	0	0	0	−1	0
Tim Schaller^{†}	2	0	0	0	−1	0
Kale Clague	4	0	0	0	−3	2
Tobias Bjornfot	3	0	0	0	−4	0

=== Goaltenders ===
Regular season
Player	GP	GS	TOI	W	L	OT	GA	GAA	SA	SV%	SO	G	A	PIM
Jonathan Quick	42	42	2,516:14	16	22	4	117	2.79	1,224	.904	1	0	1	0
Jack Campbell^{‡}	20	20	1,201:38	8	10	2	57	2.85	572	.900	0	0	0	0
Cal Petersen	8	8	477:22	5	3	0	21	2.64	269	.922	0	0	0	0

^{†}Denotes player spent time with another team before joining the Kings. Stats reflect time with the Kings only.
^{‡}Denotes player was traded mid-season. Stats reflect time with the Kings only.
Bold/italics denotes franchise record.
