= 2019–20 Nashville Predators season =

Professional ice hockey team season

2019–20 Nashville Predators
- Division: 4th Central
- Conference: 6th Western
- 2019–20 record: 35–26–8
- Home record: 17–14–4
- Road record: 18–12–4
- Goals for: 215
- Goals against: 217

Team information
- General manager: David Poile
- Coach: Peter Laviolette (Oct. 3 – Jan. 6); John Hynes (Jan. 7 – Aug. 7)
- Captain: Roman Josi
- Alternate captains: Mattias Ekholm; Ryan Ellis; Filip Forsberg; Ryan Johansen
- Arena: Bridgestone Arena
- Average attendance: 17,407
- Minor league affiliates: Milwaukee Admirals (AHL); Florida Everblades (ECHL)

Team leaders
- Goals: Filip Forsberg (21)
- Assists: Roman Josi (49)
- Points: Roman Josi (65)
- Penalty minutes: Austin Watson (65)
- Plus/minus: Roman Josi (+22)
- Wins: Pekka Rinne (18)
- Goals against average: Juuse Saros (2.70)

The 2019–20 Nashville Predators season was the 22nd season for the National Hockey League (NHL) franchise that was established on June 25, 1997. They entered the season as the two-time defending Central Division champions.

The season was suspended by the league officials on March 12, 2020, after several other professional and collegiate sports organizations followed suit as a result of the ongoing COVID-19 pandemic. On May 26, the NHL regular season was officially declared over with the remaining games being cancelled. The Predators advanced to the playoffs, entering in the qualifying round, but were defeated in four games by the Arizona Coyotes in the qualifying round.

== Standings ==
=== Divisional standings ===
Central Division
Pos	Team	GP	W	L	OTL	RW	GF	GA	GD	Pts
1	St. Louis Blues	71	42	19	10	33	225	193	+32	94
2	Colorado Avalanche	70	42	20	8	37	237	191	+46	92
3	Dallas Stars	69	37	24	8	26	180	177	+3	82
4	Winnipeg Jets	71	37	28	6	30	216	203	+13	80
5	Nashville Predators	69	35	26	8	28	215	217	−2	78
6	Minnesota Wild	69	35	27	7	30	220	220	0	77
7	Chicago Blackhawks	70	32	30	8	23	212	218	−6	72

Source: National Hockey League

=== Western Conference ===
Pos	Team	GP	W	L	OTL	RW	GF	GA	GD	PCT	Qualification
1	St. Louis Blues	71	42	19	10	33	225	193	+32	.662	Advance to Seeding round-robin tournament
2	Colorado Avalanche	70	42	20	8	37	237	191	+46	.657	Advance to Seeding round-robin tournament
3	Vegas Golden Knights	71	39	24	8	30	227	211	+16	.606	Advance to Seeding round-robin tournament
4	Dallas Stars	69	37	24	8	26	180	177	+3	.594	Advance to Seeding round-robin tournament
5	Edmonton Oilers	71	37	25	9	31	225	217	+8	.585	Advance to 2020 Stanley Cup playoffs qualifying round
6	Nashville Predators	69	35	26	8	28	215	217	−2	.565	Advance to 2020 Stanley Cup playoffs qualifying round
7	Vancouver Canucks	69	36	27	6	27	228	217	+11	.565	Advance to 2020 Stanley Cup playoffs qualifying round
8	Calgary Flames	70	36	27	7	25	210	215	−5	.564	Advance to 2020 Stanley Cup playoffs qualifying round
9	Winnipeg Jets	71	37	28	6	30	216	203	+13	.563	Advance to 2020 Stanley Cup playoffs qualifying round
10	Minnesota Wild	69	35	27	7	30	220	220	0	.558	Advance to 2020 Stanley Cup playoffs qualifying round
11	Arizona Coyotes	70	33	29	8	26	195	187	+8	.529	Advance to 2020 Stanley Cup playoffs qualifying round
12	Chicago Blackhawks	70	32	30	8	23	212	218	−6	.514	Advance to 2020 Stanley Cup playoffs qualifying round
13	Anaheim Ducks	71	29	33	9	20	187	226	−39	.472	
14	Los Angeles Kings	70	29	35	6	21	178	212	−34	.457	
15	San Jose Sharks	70	29	36	5	22	182	226	−44	.450	

Source: National Hockey League

==== Tiebreaking procedures ====
1. Fewer number of games played (only used during regular season).
2. Greater number of regulation wins (denoted by RW).
3. Greater number of wins in regulation and overtime (excluding shootout wins; denoted by ROW).
4. Greater number of total wins (including shootouts).
5. Greater number of points earned in head-to-head play; if teams played an uneven number of head-to-head games, the result of the first game on the home ice of the team with the extra home game is discarded.
6. Greater goal differential (difference between goals for and goals against).
7. Greater number of goals scored (denoted by GF).

== Schedule and results ==
=== Preseason ===
The preseason schedule was published on June 12, 2019.

2019 pre-season game log: 5–1–0 (home: 4–0–0; road: 1–1–0)
#	Date	Visitor	Score	Home	OT	Decision	Attendance	Record	Recap
1^{[A]}	September 16	Florida	3–6	Nashville		Ingram	—	1–0–0
2^{[A]}	September 16	Florida	0–1	Nashville		Saros	17,200	2–0–0
3	September 20	Nashville	1–3	Tampa Bay		Saros	13,456	2–1–0
4	September 21	Tampa Bay	4–5	Nashville	OT	Rinne	—	3–1–0
5	September 25	Carolina	0–3	Nashville		Rinne	17,159	4–1–0
6	September 27	Nashville	2–1	Carolina	OT	Saros	11,212	5–1–0
Notes:^{A} Indicates split-squad.

=== Regular season ===
The regular season schedule was published on June 25, 2019.

2019–20 game log

October: 8–3–2 (home: 6–1–2; road: 2–2–0)
#	Date	Visitor	Score	Home	OT	Decision	Attendance	Record	Pts	Recap
1	October 3	Minnesota	2–5	Nashville		Rinne	17,455	1–0–0	2
2	October 5	Detroit	5–3	Nashville		Saros	17,539	1–1–0	2
3	October 8	San Jose	2–5	Nashville		Rinne	17,251	2–1–0	4
4	October 10	Washington	5–6	Nashville		Rinne	17,386	3–1–0	6
5	October 12	Nashville	4–7	Los Angeles		Saros	18,230	3–2–0	6
6	October 15	Nashville	5–2	Vegas		Rinne	18,188	4–2–0	8
7	October 17	Nashville	2–5	Arizona		Saros	13,521	4–3–0	8
8	October 19	Florida	3–2	Nashville	SO	Rinne	17,534	4–3–1	9
9	October 22	Anaheim	1–6	Nashville		Rinne	17,424	5–3–1	11
10	October 24	Minnesota	0–4	Nashville		Rinne	17,386	6–3–1	13
11	October 26	Nashville	3–2	Tampa Bay	OT	Saros	19,092	7–3–1	15
12	October 29	Chicago	0–3	Nashville		Rinne	17,259	8–3–1	17
13	October 31	Calgary	6–5	Nashville	OT	Rinne	17,351	8–3–2	18

November: 4–7–2 (home: 1–4–1; road: 3–3–1)
#	Date	Visitor	Score	Home	OT	Decision	Attendance	Record	Pts	Recap
14	November 2	NY Rangers	2–1	Nashville		Saros	17,371	8–4–2	18
15	November 4	Nashville	6–1	Detroit		Rinne	18,526	9–4–2	20
16	November 7	Nashville	4–9	Colorado		Rinne	17,492	9–5–2	20
17	November 9	Nashville	1–2	San Jose	SO	Saros	17,562	9–5–3	21
18	November 12	Nashville	3–5	Vancouver		Rinne	18,233	9–6–3	21
19	November 16	Chicago	7–2	Nashville		Rinne	17,393	9–7–3	21
20	November 19	Winnipeg	2–1	Nashville		Saros	17,165	9–8–3	21
21	November 21	Vancouver	6–3	Nashville		Rinne	17,168	9–9–3	21
22	November 23	Nashville	4–2	St. Louis		Saros	18,096	10–9–3	23
23	November 25	St. Louis	2–3	Nashville	SO	Saros	17,168	11–9–3	25
24	November 27	Vegas	4–3	Nashville	OT	Saros	17,326	11–9–4	26
25	November 29	Nashville	3–0	Carolina		Rinne	19,680	12–9–4	28
26	November 30	Nashville	0–3	Florida		Saros	14,285	12–10–4	28

December: 6–4–2 (home: 3–2–1; road: 3–2–1)
#	Date	Visitor	Score	Home	OT	Decision	Attendance	Record	Pts	Recap
27	December 3	Tampa Bay	3–2	Nashville	OT	Rinne	17,163	12–10–5	29
28	December 7	New Jersey	4–6	Nashville		Rinne	17,418	13–10–5	31
29	December 10	San Jose	1–3	Nashville		Saros	17,160	14–10–5	33
30	December 12	Nashville	3–4	Buffalo		Saros	17,211	14–11–5	33
31	December 14	Dallas	4–1	Nashville		Rinne	17,586	14–12–5	33
32	December 16	Nashville	5–2	NY Rangers		Saros	17,286	15–12–5	35
33	December 17	Nashville	8–3	NY Islanders		Rinne	12,114	16–12–5	37
34	December 19	Nashville	4–5	Ottawa	OT	Saros	10,407	16–12–6	38
35	December 21	Nashville	4–3	Boston	OT	Rinne	17,850	17–12–6	40
36	December 23	Arizona	2–3	Nashville		Rinne	17,697	18–12–6	42
37	December 27	Pittsburgh	5–2	Nashville		Rinne	17,849	18–13–6	42
38	December 28	Nashville	4–6	Pittsburgh		Rinne	18,628	18–14–6	42

January: 6–5–1 (home: 1–3–0; road: 5–2–1)
#	Date	Visitor	Score	Home	OT	Decision	Attendance	Record	Pts	Recap
39	January 1	Nashville	2–4	Dallas		Rinne	85,630 (outdoors)	18–15–6	42
40	January 4	Nashville	4–1	Los Angeles		Rinne	18,230	19–15–6	44
41	January 5	Nashville	4–5	Anaheim	SO	Saros	15,858	19–15–7	45
42	January 7	Boston	6–2	Nashville		Rinne	17,623	19–16–7	45
43	January 9	Nashville	5–2	Chicago		Rinne	21,440	20–16–7	47
44	January 12	Nashville	1–0	Winnipeg		Saros	15,325	21–16–7	49
45	January 14	Nashville	2–4	Edmonton		Rinne	17,029	21–17–7	49
46	January 16	Anaheim	4–2	Nashville		Saros	17,388	21–18–7	49
47	January 18	Buffalo	1–2	Nashville		Rinne	17,729	22–18–7	51
48	January 27	Toronto	5–2	Nashville		Rinne	17,298	22–19–7	51
49	January 29	Nashville	5–4	Washington		Saros	18,573	23–19–7	53
50	January 30	Nashville	6–5	New Jersey	SO	Rinne	14,327	24–19–7	55

February: 8–5–1 (home: 5–3–0; road: 3–2–1)
#	Date	Visitor	Score	Home	OT	Decision	Attendance	Record	Pts	Recap
51	February 1	Vegas	3–0	Nashville		Rinne	17,664	24–20–7	55
52	February 4	Nashville	2–1	Winnipeg	OT	Saros	15,325	25–20–7	57
53	February 6	Nashville	3–2	Calgary		Saros	18,512	26–20–7	59
54	February 8	Nashville	2–3	Edmonton		Saros	17,212	26–21–7	59
55	February 10	Nashville	2–6	Vancouver		Rinne	18,871	26–22–7	59
56	February 13	NY Islanders	0–5	Nashville		Saros	17,561	27–22–7	61
57	February 15	Nashville	4–3	St. Louis		Saros	18,096	28–22–7	63
58	February 16	St. Louis	1–2	Nashville		Rinne	17,349	29–22–7	65
59	February 18	Carolina	4–1	Nashville		Saros	17,204	29–23–7	65
60	February 21	Nashville	1–2	Chicago	OT	Rinne	21,878	29–23–8	66
61	February 22	Columbus	3–4	Nashville	SO	Saros	17,549	30–23–8	68
62	February 25	Ottawa	2–3	Nashville		Saros	17,205	31–23–8	70
63	February 27	Calgary	3–4	Nashville	OT	Saros	17,350	32–23–8	72
64	February 29	Colorado	3–2	Nashville		Saros	17,619	32–24–8	72

March: 3–2–0 (home: 0–1–0; road: 3–1–0)
#	Date	Visitor	Score	Home	OT	Decision	Attendance	Record	Pts	Recap
65	March 2	Edmonton	8–3	Nashville		Rinne	17,316	32–25–8	72
66	March 3	Nashville	1–3	Minnesota		Saros	17,242	32–26–8	72
67	March 5	Dallas	0–2	Nashville		Saros	17,349	33–26–8	74
68	March 7	Nashville	1–0	Dallas		Saros	18,532	34–26–8	76
69	March 10	Nashville	4–2	Montreal		Saros	21,021	35–26–8	78

Cancelled games
#	Date	Visitor	Home
70	March 12	Nashville	Toronto
71	March 14	Nashville	Columbus
72	March 15	Nashville	Minnesota
73	March 19	Colorado	Nashville
74	March 21	Philadelphia	Nashville
75	March 22	Nashville	Chicago
76	March 24	Winnipeg	Nashville
77	March 26	Los Angeles	Nashville
78	March 28	Nashville	Arizona
79	March 29	Nashville	Colorado
80	April 1	Montreal	Nashville
81	April 2	Nashville	Philadelphia
82	April 4	Minnesota	Nashville

Legend: Win (2 points) Loss (0 points) Overtime/shootout loss (1 point)

=== Playoffs ===
The Predators lost to the Arizona Coyotes in four games in the qualifying round.

2020 Stanley Cup playoffs

Western Conference Qualifying Round vs. (11) Arizona Coyotes: Arizona won 3–1
#	Date	Visitor	Score	Home	OT	Decision	Series	Recap
1	August 2	Arizona	4–3	Nashville		Saros	0–1
2	August 4	Arizona	2–4	Nashville		Saros	1–1
3	August 5	Nashville	1–4	Arizona		Saros	1–2
4	August 7	Nashville	3–4	Arizona	OT	Saros	1–3

Legend: Win Loss

== Player statistics ==
=== Skaters ===
Regular season
Player	GP	G	A	Pts	+/−	PIM
Roman Josi	69	16	49	65	22	41
Filip Forsberg	63	21	27	48	−7	29
Matt Duchene	66	13	29	42	−4	24
Ryan Ellis	49	8	30	38	16	19
Ryan Johansen	68	14	22	36	−5	45
Nick Bonino	67	18	17	35	17	16
Calle Jarnkrok	64	15	19	34	4	14
Mattias Ekholm	68	8	25	33	−1	32
Craig Smith	69	18	13	31	18	34
Rocco Grimaldi	66	10	21	31	10	10
Kyle Turris	62	9	22	31	−9	22
Mikael Granlund	63	17	13	30	−4	28
Viktor Arvidsson	57	15	13	28	−4	26
Colton Sissons	57	9	6	15	−2	20
Austin Watson	53	6	8	14	−9	65
Dante Fabbro	64	5	6	11	−7	38
Colin Blackwell	27	3	7	10	7	10
Dan Hamhuis	60	0	8	8	6	35
Yakov Trenin	21	2	4	6	1	9
Jarred Tinordi	28	1	4	5	−1	34
Yannick Weber	41	1	2	3	−1	14
Matt Irwin^{‡}	27	0	2	2	−8	11
Daniel Carr	11	1	0	1	−5	4
Miikka Salomaki^{‡}	5	1	0	1	2	4
Mathieu Olivier	8	0	1	1	1	4
Steven Santini	2	0	0	0	1	2
Alexandre Carrier	3	0	0	0	2	2
Korbinian Holzer^{†}	3	0	0	0	−1	2
Anthony Richard	1	0	0	0	−1	0

Playoffs
Player	GP	G	A	Pts	+/−	PIM
Filip Forsberg	4	3	2	5	1	2
Ryan Johansen	4	1	4	5	1	2
Roman Josi	4	0	4	4	−2	4
Viktor Arvidsson	4	3	0	3	0	2
Ryan Ellis	4	1	2	3	0	2
Matt Duchene	4	1	1	2	−4	2
Nick Bonino	4	1	0	1	−2	2
Calle Jarnkrok	4	1	0	1	0	0
Mattias Ekholm	4	0	1	1	−2	0
Colton Sissons	4	0	1	1	0	0
Rocco Grimaldi	4	0	1	1	−1	2
Mikael Granlund	4	0	1	1	−3	2
Dante Fabbro	4	0	0	0	−1	2
Jarred Tinordi	4	0	0	0	−2	2
Austin Watson	4	0	0	0	0	2
Craig Smith	4	0	0	0	−4	2
Yannick Weber	4	0	0	0	−2	0
Kyle Turris	4	0	0	0	−4	0

=== Goaltenders ===
Regular season
Player	GP	GS	TOI	W	L	OT	GA	GAA	SA	SV%	SO	G	A	PIM
Pekka Rinne	36	35	1,987:46	18	14	4	105	3.17	1,004	.895	3	1	2	0
Juuse Saros	40	34	2,176:50	17	12	4	98	2.70	1,142	.914	4	0	0	0

Playoffs
Player	GP	GS	TOI	W	L	GA	GAA	SA	SV%	SO	G	A	PIM
Juuse Saros	4	4	242:09	1	3	13	3.22	124	.895	0	0	0	0

^{†}Denotes player spent time with another team before joining the Predators. Stats reflect time with the Predators only.
^{‡}Denotes player was traded mid-season. Stats reflect time with the Predators only.
Bold/italics denotes franchise record.

== Draft picks ==
Below are the Nashville Predators' selections at the 2019 NHL entry draft, which will be held on June 21 and 22, 2019, at Rogers Arena in Vancouver, British Columbia.

Round	#	Player	Pos	Nationality	College/Junior/Club team (League)
1	24	Philip Tomasino	C	Canada	Niagara IceDogs (OHL)
2	45^{1}	Egor Afanasyev	LW	Russia	Muskegon Lumberjacks (USHL)
3	65	Alexander Campbell	LW	Canada	Victoria Grizzlies (BCHL)
4	109^{2}	Marc Del Gaizo	D	United States	UMass (Hockey East)
4	117	Semyon Chystyakov	D	Russia	Tolpar Ufa (MHL)
5	148	Ethan Haider	G	United States	Minnesota Magicians (NAHL)
6	179	Isak Walther	RW	Sweden	Södertälje SK J18 (J18 Elit)
7	210	Juuso Parssinen	C	Finland	TPS U20 (Nuorten SM-liiga)

=== Notes ===
1. The Arizona Coyotes' second-round pick went to the Nashville Predators as the result of a trade on June 22, 2019, that sent New Jersey's second-round pick in 2019 (34th overall) to Philadelphia in exchange for New Jersey's third-round pick in 2019 (65th overall) and this pick.
2. The Colorado Avalanche's fourth-round pick went to the Nashville Predators as the result of a trade on July 1, 2017, that sent Colin Wilson to Colorado in exchange for this pick.
