= 2019–20 Buffalo Sabres season =

Season of play of professional ice hockey team

2019–20 Buffalo Sabres
- Division: 6th Atlantic
- Conference: 13th Eastern
- 2019–20 record: 30–31–8
- Home record: 20–11–4
- Road record: 10–20–4
- Goals for: 195
- Goals against: 217

Team information
- General manager: Jason Botterill
- Coach: Ralph Krueger
- Captain: Jack Eichel
- Alternate captains: Marcus Johansson; Jake McCabe
- Arena: KeyBank Center
- Average attendance: 17,167
- Minor league affiliates: Rochester Americans (AHL); Cincinnati Cyclones (ECHL)

Team leaders
- Goals: Jack Eichel (36 goals)
- Assists: Jack Eichel (42 assists)
- Points: Jack Eichel (78 points)
- Penalty minutes: Rasmus Ristolainen (46 penatily minute)
- Plus/minus: Brandon Montour (+13)
- Wins: Linus Ullmark (17 wins)
- Goals against average: Linus Ullmark (2.69 per game)

The 2019–20 Buffalo Sabres season was the 50th season for the National Hockey League (NHL) franchise that was established on May 22, 1970.

The season was suspended by the league officials on March 12, 2020, after several other professional and collegiate sports organizations followed suit as a result of the ongoing COVID-19 pandemic. On May 26, the NHL regular season was officially declared over with the remaining games being cancelled and the Sabres missed the playoffs for the ninth straight year.

== Off-season ==
The Sabres fired head coach Phil Housley on April 7, 2019, amid a dreadful second half of the season, in which the Sabres had only won 16 of their last 57 games after being on the top of the standings in November. The team hired Ralph Krueger as Housley's replacement on May 15. Krueger's lone NHL head coaching experience was at the helm of the Edmonton Oilers during part of the strike-shortened 2012–13 NHL season; he had also coached Team Europe at the 2016 World Cup of Hockey. He most recently served as the chairman of Southampton F.C., a position that he held for five years.

On May 20, the Sabres unveiled logos for their upcoming 50th anniversary season.

On August 16, the Sabres unveiled their third jersey for the 2019–20 season and simultaneously announced that they will return to royal blue starting in 2020-21 season.

== Standings ==
=== Divisional standings ===
Atlantic Division
Pos	Team	GP	W	L	OTL	RW	GF	GA	GD	Pts
1	p – Boston Bruins	70	44	14	12	38	227	174	+53	100
2	Tampa Bay Lightning	70	43	21	6	35	245	195	+50	92
3	Toronto Maple Leafs	70	36	25	9	28	238	227	+11	81
4	Florida Panthers	69	35	26	8	30	231	228	+3	78
5	Montreal Canadiens	71	31	31	9	19	212	221	−9	71
6	Buffalo Sabres	69	30	31	8	22	195	217	−22	68
7	Ottawa Senators	71	25	34	12	18	191	243	−52	62
8	Detroit Red Wings	71	17	49	5	13	145	267	−122	39

Source: National Hockey League
p – Clinched Presidents' Trophy

=== Eastern Conference ===
Pos	Team	GP	W	L	OTL	RW	GF	GA	GD	PCT	Qualification
1	Boston Bruins	70	44	14	12	38	227	174	+53	.714	Advance to Seeding round-robin tournament
2	Tampa Bay Lightning	70	43	21	6	35	245	195	+50	.657	Advance to Seeding round-robin tournament
3	Washington Capitals	69	41	20	8	31	240	215	+25	.652	Advance to Seeding round-robin tournament
4	Philadelphia Flyers	69	41	21	7	31	232	196	+36	.645	Advance to Seeding round-robin tournament
5	Pittsburgh Penguins	69	40	23	6	29	224	196	+28	.623	Advance to 2020 Stanley Cup playoffs qualifying round
6	Carolina Hurricanes	68	38	25	5	27	222	193	+29	.596	Advance to 2020 Stanley Cup playoffs qualifying round
7	New York Islanders	68	35	23	10	24	192	193	−1	.588	Advance to 2020 Stanley Cup playoffs qualifying round
8	Toronto Maple Leafs	70	36	25	9	28	238	227	+11	.579	Advance to 2020 Stanley Cup playoffs qualifying round
9	Columbus Blue Jackets	70	33	22	15	25	180	187	−7	.579	Advance to 2020 Stanley Cup playoffs qualifying round
10	Florida Panthers	69	35	26	8	30	231	228	+3	.565	Advance to 2020 Stanley Cup playoffs qualifying round
11	New York Rangers	70	37	28	5	31	234	222	+12	.564	Advance to 2020 Stanley Cup playoffs qualifying round
12	Montreal Canadiens	71	31	31	9	19	212	221	−9	.500	Advance to 2020 Stanley Cup playoffs qualifying round
13	Buffalo Sabres	69	30	31	8	22	195	217	−22	.493	
14	New Jersey Devils	69	28	29	12	22	189	230	−41	.493	
15	Ottawa Senators	71	25	34	12	18	191	243	−52	.437	
16	Detroit Red Wings	71	17	49	5	13	145	267	−122	.275	

Source: National Hockey League

== Schedule and results ==
=== Preseason ===
The pre-season schedule was published on June 18, 2019.

2019 preseason game log: 4–2–0 (Home: 3–0–0; Road: 1–2–0)
#	Date	Visitor	Score	Home	OT	Decision	Attendance	Record	Recap
1^{[a]}	September 16	Pittsburgh	4–5	Buffalo	OT	Johansson	5,497	1–0–0
2	September 17	Buffalo	1–4	Columbus		Hammond	–	1–1–0
3	September 20	Buffalo	0–3	Toronto		Ullmark	16,232	1–2–0
4	September 21	Toronto	3–5	Buffalo		Hutton	17,224	2–2–0
5	September 25	Columbus	3–4	Buffalo	OT	Hutton	15,788	3–2–0
6	September 28	Buffalo	3–2	Pittsburgh	SO	Ullmark	18,235	4–2–0
Notes:^{a} Game was played at Pegula Ice Arena in University Park, PA.

=== Regular season ===
The regular season schedule was published on June 25, 2019.

2019–20 game log

October: 9–2–2 (Home: 5–0–1; Road: 4–2–1)
#	Date	Visitor	Score	Home	OT	Decision	Attendance	Record	Pts	Recap
1	October 3	Buffalo	3–1	Pittsburgh		Hutton	18,616	1–0–0	2
2	October 5	New Jersey	2–7	Buffalo		Hutton	19,070	2–0–0	4
3	October 7	Buffalo	3–4	Columbus	OT	Ullmark	14,518	2–0–1	5
4	October 9	Montreal	4–5	Buffalo	OT	Hutton	15,383	3–0–1	7
5	October 11	Florida	2–3	Buffalo	SO	Ullmark	15,638	4–0–1	9
6	October 14	Dallas	0–4	Buffalo		Hutton	16,595	5–0–1	11
7	October 16	Buffalo	2–5	Anaheim		Ullmark	15,193	5–1–1	11
8	October 17	Buffalo	3–0	Los Angeles		Hutton	17,605	6–1–1	13
9	October 19	Buffalo	4–3	San Jose		Ullmark	17,562	7–1–1	15
10	October 22	San Jose	3–4	Buffalo	OT	Hutton	15,876	8–1–1	17
11	October 24	Buffalo	2–6	NY Rangers		Hutton	16,913	8–2–1	17
12	October 25	Buffalo	2–0	Detroit		Ullmark	18,616	9–2–1	19
13	October 28	Arizona	3–2	Buffalo	SO	Hutton	15,358	9–2–2	20

November: 3–8–3 (Home: 2–3–2; Road: 1–5–1)
#	Date	Visitor	Score	Home	OT	Decision	Attendance	Record	Pts	Recap
14	November 1	Buffalo	1–6	Washington		Ullmark	18,573	9–3–2	20
15	November 2	NY Islanders	1–0	Buffalo		Hutton	19,070	9–4–2	20
16^{[a]}	November 8	Tampa Bay	3–2	Buffalo		Ullmark	13,230	9–5–2	20
17^{[a]}	November 9	Buffalo	3–5	Tampa Bay		Hutton	13,339	9–6–2	20
18	November 14	Carolina	5–4	Buffalo	OT	Hutton	16,603	9–6–3	21
19	November 16	Ottawa	2–4	Buffalo		Ullmark	18,555	10–6–3	23
20	November 17	Buffalo	1–4	Chicago		Hutton	21,334	10–7–3	23
21	November 19	Minnesota	4–1	Buffalo		Ullmark	15,522	10–8–3	23
22	November 21	Buffalo	2–3	Boston		Ullmark	17,850	10–9–3	23
23	November 24	Buffalo	5–2	Florida		Ullmark	14,443	11–9–3	25
24	November 25	Buffalo	2–5	Tampa Bay		Hutton	19,092	11–10–3	25
25	November 27	Calgary	3–2	Buffalo	OT	Ullmark	17,485	11–10–4	26
26	November 29	Toronto	4–6	Buffalo		Ullmark	19,070	12–10–4	28
27	November 30	Buffalo	1–2	Toronto	OT	Hutton	19,250	12–10–5	29
Notes:^{a} Game was played at Ericsson Globe in Stockholm, Sweden.

December: 5–7–2 (Home: 4–2–0; Road: 1–5–2)
#	Date	Visitor	Score	Home	OT	Decision	Attendance	Record	Pts	Recap
28	December 2	New Jersey	1–7	Buffalo		Ullmark	15,422	13–10–5	31
29	December 5	Buffalo	3–4	Calgary		Ullmark	18,085	13–11–5	31
30	December 7	Buffalo	5–6	Vancouver	OT	Hutton	18,871	13–11–6	32
31	December 8	Buffalo	3–2	Edmonton	OT	Ullmark	17,227	14–11–6	34
32	December 10	St. Louis	2–5	Buffalo		Ullmark	16,521	15–11–6	36
33	December 12	Nashville	3–4	Buffalo		Ullmark	17,211	16–11–6	38
34	December 14	Buffalo	2–3	NY Islanders	OT	Ullmark	13,795	16–11–7	39
35	December 17	Buffalo	3–5	Toronto		Ullmark	19,365	16–12–7	39
36	December 19	Buffalo	1–6	Philadelphia		Hutton	18,124	16–13–7	39
37	December 21	Los Angeles	2–3	Buffalo		Ullmark	17,484	17–13–7	41
38	December 23	Buffalo	1–3	Ottawa		Ullmark	11,838	17–14–7	41
39	December 27	Boston	3–0	Buffalo		Ullmark	19,070	17–15–7	41
40	December 29	Buffalo	2–3	Boston		Ullmark	17,850	17–16–7	41
41	December 31	Tampa Bay	6–4	Buffalo		Ullmark	18,465	17–17–7	41

January: 5–5–0 (Home: 3–3–0; Road: 2–2–0)
#	Date	Visitor	Score	Home	OT	Decision	Attendance	Record	Pts	Recap
42	January 2	Edmonton	2–3	Buffalo	OT	Ullmark	19,070	18–17–7	43
43	January 4	Florida	2–3	Buffalo		Ullmark	17,731	19–17–7	45
44	January 9	Buffalo	1–5	St. Louis		Ullmark	18,096	19–18–7	45
45	January 11	Vancouver	6–3	Buffalo		Hutton	18,509	19–19–7	45
46	January 12	Buffalo	5–1	Detroit		Ullmark	18,312	20–19–7	47
47	January 14	Vegas	2–4	Buffalo		Ullmark	18,257	21–19–7	49
48	January 16	Buffalo	4–1	Dallas		Ullmark	18,532	22–19–7	51
49	January 18	Buffalo	1–2	Nashville		Ullmark	17,729	22–20–7	51
50	January 28	Ottawa	5–2	Buffalo		Ullmark	16,651	22–21–7	51
51	January 30	Montreal	3–1	Buffalo		Hutton	16,604	22–22–7	51

February: 7–6–1 (Home: 5–2–1; Road: 2–4–0)
#	Date	Visitor	Score	Home	OT	Decision	Attendance	Record	Pts	Recap
52	February 1	Columbus	1–2	Buffalo	OT	Hutton	17,650	23–22–7	53
53	February 4	Colorado	6–1	Buffalo		Hutton	16,859	23–23–7	53
54	February 6	Detroit	4–3	Buffalo	SO	Johansson	16,607	23–23–8	54
55	February 7	Buffalo	3–2	NY Rangers		Hutton	17,297	24–23–8	56
56	February 9	Anaheim	3–2	Buffalo		Johansson	16,131	24–24–8	56
57	February 11	Detroit	2–3	Buffalo		Hutton	16,588	25–24–8	58
58	February 13	Columbus	3–4	Buffalo	OT	Hutton	16,923	26–24–8	60
59	February 16	Toronto	2–5	Buffalo		Hutton	19,070	27–24–8	62
60	February 18	Buffalo	4–7	Ottawa		Hutton	15,040	27–25–8	62
61	February 22	Buffalo	5–2	Pittsburgh		Hutton	18,620	28–25–8	64
62	February 23	Winnipeg	1–2	Buffalo		Johansson	17,805	29–25–8	66
63	February 26	Buffalo	2–3	Colorado		Hutton	18,020	29–26–8	66
64	February 28	Buffalo	2–4	Vegas		Hutton	18,404	29–27–8	66
65	February 29	Buffalo	2–5	Arizona		Johansson	17,125	29–28–8	66

March: 1–3–0 (Home: 1–1–0; Road: 0–2–0)
#	Date	Visitor	Score	Home	OT	Decision	Attendance	Record	Pts	Recap
66	March 3	Buffalo	1–3	Winnipeg		Hutton	15,325	29–29–8	66
67	March 5	Pittsburgh	4–2	Buffalo		Johansson	18,236	29–30–8	66
68	March 7	Buffalo	1–3	Philadelphia		Hutton	19,781	29–31–8	66
69	March 9	Washington	2–3	Buffalo	SO	Ullmark	16,539	30–31–8	68

Cancelled games
#	Date	Visitor	Home
70	March 12	Buffalo	Montreal
71	March 13	Boston	Buffalo
72	March 15	Carolina	Buffalo
73	March 17	Buffalo	Carolina
74	March 19	Buffalo	Florida
75	March 21	Chicago	Buffalo
76	March 22	NY Rangers	Buffalo
77	March 24	Buffalo	Montreal
78	March 26	Buffalo	NY Islanders
79	March 28	Buffalo	Minnesota
80	March 30	Washington	Buffalo
81	April 2	Buffalo	New Jersey
82	April 4	Philadelphia	Buffalo

Legend: Win (2 points) Loss (0 points) Overtime/shootout loss (1 point)

== Player statistics ==
=== Skaters ===
Regular season
Player	GP	G	A	Pts	+/−	PIM
Jack Eichel	68	36	42	78	5	34
Sam Reinhart	69	22	28	50	−15	20
Victor Olofsson	54	20	22	42	−1	6
Rasmus Dahlin	59	4	36	40	−7	38
Rasmus Ristolainen	69	6	27	33	−2	46
Marcus Johansson	60	9	21	30	−12	20
Jeff Skinner	59	14	9	23	−22	18
Jimmy Vesey	64	9	11	20	12	15
Zemgus Girgensons	69	12	7	19	−1	10
Kyle Okposo	52	9	10	19	−3	28
Conor Sheary^{‡}	55	9	10	19	−4	8
Johan Larsson	62	6	12	18	8	26
Brandon Montour	54	5	13	18	13	28
Henri Jokiharju	69	4	11	15	−6	32
Jake McCabe	66	3	10	13	−11	41
Colin Miller	51	1	10	11	−9	22
Curtis Lazar	38	5	5	10	−3	9
Evan Rodrigues^{‡}	38	5	4	9	−8	10
Casey Mittelstadt	31	4	5	9	−5	2
Marco Scandella^{‡}	31	3	6	9	9	8
Zach Bogosian	19	1	4	5	0	10
Dominik Kahun^{†}	6	2	2	4	2	0
Michael Frolik^{†}	19	1	3	4	−2	4
Vladimir Sobotka	16	1	2	3	2	4
Rasmus Asplund	29	1	2	3	−4	6
Scott Wilson	6	1	1	2	1	2
Wayne Simmonds^{†}	7	0	1	1	−4	2
John Gilmour	4	0	0	0	−2	0
Tage Thompson	1	0	0	0	0	0
Jean-Sebastien Dea	3	0	0	0	0	0
Dalton Smith	1	0	0	0	1	2
Lawrence Pilut	13	0	0	0	−4	4

=== Goaltenders ===
Regular season
Player	GP	GS	TOI	W	L	OT	GA	GAA	SA	SV%	SO	G	A	PIM
Linus Ullmark	34	34	2,026:38	17	14	3	91	2.69	1,066	.915	1	0	0	4
Carter Hutton	31	30	1,775:26	12	14	4	94	3.18	918	.898	2	0	1	6
Jonas Johansson	6	5	326:44	1	3	1	16	2.94	151	.894	0	0	0	0

^{†}Denotes player spent time with another team before joining the Sabres. Stats reflect time with the Sabres only.
^{‡}Denotes player was traded mid-season. Stats reflect time with the Sabres only.
Bold/italics denotes franchise record.

== Transactions ==
The Sabres have been involved in the following transactions during the 2019–20 season.

=== Trades ===
Date	Details		Ref
June 22, 2019	To Vancouver Canucks SJS's 4th-round pick in 2019; WPG's 6th-round pick in 2019	To Buffalo Sabres 4th-round pick in 2019	
June 22, 2019	To Detroit Red Wings TOR's 6th-round pick in 2019; 7th-round pick in 2019	To Buffalo Sabres CBJ's 5th-round pick in 2019	
June 28, 2019	To Vegas Golden Knights STL's 2nd-round pick in 2021; 5th-round pick in 2022	To Buffalo Sabres Colin Miller	
July 1, 2019	To New York Rangers 3rd-round pick in 2021	To Buffalo Sabres Jimmy Vesey	
July 9, 2019	To Chicago Blackhawks Alexander Nylander	To Buffalo Sabres Henri Jokiharju	
January 2, 2020	To Montreal Canadiens Marco Scandella	To Buffalo Sabres 4th-round pick in 2020	
January 2, 2020	To Calgary Flames 4th-round pick in 2020	To Buffalo Sabres Michael Frolik	
February 24, 2020	To Pittsburgh Penguins Evan Rodrigues; Conor Sheary	To Buffalo Sabres Dominik Kahun	
February 24, 2020	To New Jersey Devils Conditional 5th round pick in 2021	To Buffalo Sabres Wayne Simmonds	

=== Free agents ===
Date	Player	Team	Contract term	Ref
July 1, 2019	Jean-Sebastien Dea	from Florida Panthers	2-year	
July 1, 2019	Andrew Hammond	from Minnesota Wild	1-year	
July 1, 2019	Curtis Lazar	from Calgary Flames	1-year	
July 1, 2019	Scott Wedgewood	to Tampa Bay Lightning	1-year	
July 1, 2019	John Gilmour	from New York Rangers	1-year	
July 1, 2019	Kyle Criscuolo	to Philadelphia Flyers	1-year	
July 1, 2019	Danny O'Regan	to New York Rangers	1-year	
July 1, 2019	Matt Tennyson	to New Jersey Devils	2-year	
July 6, 2019	Marcus Johansson	from Boston Bruins	2-year	
December 30, 2019	Dalton Smith	from Rochester Americans (AHL)	1-year	
February 17, 2020	Taylor Leier	from Rochester Americans (AHL)	1-year	

=== Waivers ===
Date	Player	Team	Ref
July 1, 2019		from/to	

=== Contract terminations ===
Date	Player	Via	Ref
July 1, 2019			

=== Retirement ===
Date	Player	Ref
July 1, 2019		

=== Signings ===
Date	Player	Contract term	Ref
July 1, 2019	C. J. Smith	2-year	
July 6, 2019	Zemgus Girgensons	1-year	
July 12, 2019	Johan Larsson	1-year	
July 15, 2019	Dylan Cozens	3-year	
July 25, 2019	Evan Rodrigues	1-year	
August 1, 2019	Remi Elie	1-year	
August 3, 2019	Jake McCabe	2-year	
August 3, 2019	Linus Ullmark	1-year	

== Draft picks ==
Below are the Buffalo Sabres' selections at the 2019 NHL entry draft, which was held on June 21 and 22, 2019, at Rogers Arena in Vancouver, British Columbia.

Round	#	Player	Pos	Nationality	College/Junior/Club team (League)
1	7	Dylan Cozens	C	Canada	Lethbridge Hurricanes (WHL)
1	31^{1}	Ryan Johnson	D	United States	Sioux Falls Stampede (USHL)
3	67	Erik Portillo	G	Sweden	Frölunda J20 (J20 SuperElit)
4	102^{2}	Aaron Huglen	RW	United States	Roseau (HS-MN)
5	143^{3}	Filip Cederqvist	LW	Sweden	Växjö Lakers (SHL)
6	160	Lukas Rousek	RW	Czech Republic	Sparta Praha (ELH)

Notes:

1. The St. Louis Blues' first-round pick went to the Buffalo Sabres as the result of a trade on July 1, 2018, that sent Ryan O'Reilly to St. Louis in exchange for Vladimir Sobotka, Patrik Berglund, Tage Thompson, a second-round pick in 2021 and this pick (being conditional at the time of the trade).
2. The Vancouver Canucks' fourth-round pick went to the Buffalo Sabres as the result of a trade on June 22, 2019, that sent San Jose's fourth-round pick and Winnipeg's sixth-round pick both in 2019 (122nd and 175th overall) to Vancouver in exchange for this pick.
3. The Columbus Blue Jackets' fifth-round pick went to the Buffalo Sabres as the result of a trade on June 22, 2019, that sent Toronto's sixth-round pick and a seventh-round both in 2019 (177th and 191st overall) to Detroit in exchange for this pick.
