= 2019–20 Boston Bruins season =

Season of play of professional ice hockey team

2019–20 Boston Bruins
- Presidents' Trophy winners
- Atlantic Division champions
- Division: 1st Atlantic
- Conference: 1st Eastern
- 2019–20 record: 44–14–12
- Home record: 22–4–9
- Road record: 22–10–3
- Goals for: 227
- Goals against: 174

Team information
- General manager: Don Sweeney
- Coach: Bruce Cassidy
- Captain: Zdeno Chara
- Alternate captains: David Backes (Oct.–Jan.); Patrice Bergeron; David Krejci
- Arena: TD Garden
- Average attendance: 17,681
- Minor league affiliates: Providence Bruins (AHL); Atlanta Gladiators (ECHL)

Team leaders
- Goals: David Pastrnak (48)
- Assists: Brad Marchand (59)
- Points: David Pastrnak (95)
- Penalty minutes: Brad Marchand (82)
- Plus/minus: Zdeno Chara (+26)
- Wins: Tuukka Rask (26)
- Goals against average: Tuukka Rask (2.12)

The 2019–20 Boston Bruins season was the 96th season for the National Hockey League (NHL) franchise that was established on November 1, 1924. The Bruins entered the season as the defending Eastern Conference champions.

The season was suspended by the league officials on March 12, 2020, after several other professional and collegiate sports organizations followed suit as a result of the ongoing COVID-19 pandemic. On May 26, the NHL regular season was officially declared over with the remaining games being cancelled, while the Bruins were awarded the Presidents' Trophy. The Bruins advanced to the playoffs for the fourth consecutive season. However, in the second round, they were defeated by the eventual Stanley Cup champion Tampa Bay Lightning in five games.

== Standings ==
=== Divisional standings ===
Atlantic Division
Pos	Team	GP	W	L	OTL	RW	GF	GA	GD	Pts
1	p – Boston Bruins	70	44	14	12	38	227	174	+53	100
2	Tampa Bay Lightning	70	43	21	6	35	245	195	+50	92
3	Toronto Maple Leafs	70	36	25	9	28	238	227	+11	81
4	Florida Panthers	69	35	26	8	30	231	228	+3	78
5	Montreal Canadiens	71	31	31	9	19	212	221	−9	71
6	Buffalo Sabres	69	30	31	8	22	195	217	−22	68
7	Ottawa Senators	71	25	34	12	18	191	243	−52	62
8	Detroit Red Wings	71	17	49	5	13	145	267	−122	39

Source: National Hockey League
p – Clinched Presidents' Trophy

=== Eastern Conference ===
Pos	Team	GP	W	L	OTL	RW	GF	GA	GD	PCT	Qualification
1	Boston Bruins	70	44	14	12	38	227	174	+53	.714	Advance to Seeding round-robin tournament
2	Tampa Bay Lightning	70	43	21	6	35	245	195	+50	.657	Advance to Seeding round-robin tournament
3	Washington Capitals	69	41	20	8	31	240	215	+25	.652	Advance to Seeding round-robin tournament
4	Philadelphia Flyers	69	41	21	7	31	232	196	+36	.645	Advance to Seeding round-robin tournament
5	Pittsburgh Penguins	69	40	23	6	29	224	196	+28	.623	Advance to 2020 Stanley Cup playoffs qualifying round
6	Carolina Hurricanes	68	38	25	5	27	222	193	+29	.596	Advance to 2020 Stanley Cup playoffs qualifying round
7	New York Islanders	68	35	23	10	24	192	193	−1	.588	Advance to 2020 Stanley Cup playoffs qualifying round
8	Toronto Maple Leafs	70	36	25	9	28	238	227	+11	.579	Advance to 2020 Stanley Cup playoffs qualifying round
9	Columbus Blue Jackets	70	33	22	15	25	180	187	−7	.579	Advance to 2020 Stanley Cup playoffs qualifying round
10	Florida Panthers	69	35	26	8	30	231	228	+3	.565	Advance to 2020 Stanley Cup playoffs qualifying round
11	New York Rangers	70	37	28	5	31	234	222	+12	.564	Advance to 2020 Stanley Cup playoffs qualifying round
12	Montreal Canadiens	71	31	31	9	19	212	221	−9	.500	Advance to 2020 Stanley Cup playoffs qualifying round
13	Buffalo Sabres	69	30	31	8	22	195	217	−22	.493	
14	New Jersey Devils	69	28	29	12	22	189	230	−41	.493	
15	Ottawa Senators	71	25	34	12	18	191	243	−52	.437	
16	Detroit Red Wings	71	17	49	5	13	145	267	−122	.275	

Source: National Hockey League

== Schedule and results ==
=== Preseason ===
The preseason schedule was published on June 18, 2019.

2019 preseason game log: 4–0–2 (Home: 3–0–0; Road: 1–0–2)
#	Date	Visitor	Score	Home	OT	Decision	Attendance	Record	Recap
1	September 16	Boston	3–4	New Jersey	OT	Vladar	8,652	0–0–1
2	September 19	Boston	3–1	Philadelphia		Halak	16,826	1–0–1
3	September 21	Boston	2–3	Chicago	OT	Keyser	20,611	1–0–2
4	September 23	Philadelphia	3–4	Boston	OT	Vladar	17,565	2–0–2
5	September 25	New Jersey	0–2	Boston		Halak	17,565	3–0–2
6	September 28	Chicago	2–8	Boston		Rask	17,565	4–0–2

=== Regular season ===
The regular season schedule was published on June 25, 2019.

2019–20 game log

October: 9–1–2 (Home: 5–0–1; Road: 4–1–1)
#	Date	Visitor	Score	Home	OT	Decision	Attendance	Record	Pts	Recap
1	October 3	Boston	2–1	Dallas		Rask	18,532	1–0–0	2
2	October 5	Boston	1–0	Arizona		Halak	17,125	2–0–0	4
3	October 8	Boston	4–3	Vegas		Rask	18,223	3–0–0	6
4	October 10	Boston	2–4	Colorado		Halak	18,045	3–1–0	6
5	October 12	New Jersey	0–3	Boston		Rask	17,193	4–1–0	8
6	October 14	Anaheim	2–4	Boston		Halak	17,193	5–1–0	10
7	October 17	Tampa Bay	4–3	Boston	SO	Rask	17,193	5–1–1	11
8	October 19	Boston	3–4	Toronto	OT	Halak	19,394	5–1–2	12
9	October 22	Toronto	2–4	Boston		Rask	17,193	6–1–2	14
10	October 26	St. Louis	0–3	Boston		Rask	17,193	7–1–2	16
11	October 27	Boston	7–4	NY Rangers		Halak	17,144	8–1–2	18
12	October 29	San Jose	1–5	Boston		Rask	17,193	9–1–2	20

November: 9–2–3 (Home: 5–0–3; Road: 4–2–0)
#	Date	Visitor	Score	Home	OT	Decision	Attendance	Record	Pts	Recap
13	November 2	Ottawa	2–5	Boston		Rask	17,193	10–1–2	22
14	November 4	Pittsburgh	4–6	Boston		Halak	17,193	11–1–2	24
15	November 5	Boston	4–5	Montreal		Rask	21,302	11–2–2	24
16	November 8	Boston	2–4	Detroit		Rask	19,515	11–3–2	24
17	November 10	Philadelphia	3–2	Boston	SO	Halak	17,193	11–3–3	25
18	November 12	Florida	5–4	Boston	SO	Rask	17,850	11–3–4	26
19	November 15	Boston	4–2	Toronto		Rask	19,434	12–3–4	28
20	November 16	Washington	3–2	Boston	SO	Halak	17,850	12–3–5	29
21	November 19	Boston	5–1	New Jersey		Rask	15,061	13–3–5	31
22	November 21	Buffalo	2–3	Boston		Rask	17,850	14–3–5	33
23	November 23	Minnesota	4–5	Boston	OT	Rask	17,850	15–3–5	35
24	November 26	Boston	8–1	Montreal		Halak	21,302	16–3–5	37
25	November 27	Boston	2–1	Ottawa		Rask	13,336	17–3–5	39
26	November 29	NY Rangers	2–3	Boston	OT	Halak	17,850	18–3–5	41

December: 6–4–5 (Home: 4–1–4; Road: 2–3–1)
#	Date	Visitor	Score	Home	OT	Decision	Attendance	Record	Pts	Recap
27	December 1	Montreal	1–3	Boston		Rask	17,850	19–3–5	43
28	December 3	Carolina	0–2	Boston		Halak	17,850	20–3–5	45
29	December 5	Chicago	4–3	Boston	OT	Rask	17,850	20–3–6	46
30	December 7	Colorado	4–1	Boston		Halak	17,850	20–4–6	46
31	December 9	Boston	2–5	Ottawa		Rask	13,894	20–5–6	46
32	December 11	Boston	2–3	Washington		Halak	18,573	20–6–6	46
33	December 12	Boston	2–3	Tampa Bay		Rask	19,092	20–7–6	46
34	December 14	Boston	4–2	Florida		Halak	15,157	21–7–6	48
35	December 17	Los Angeles	4–3	Boston	OT	Rask	17,850	21–7–7	49
36	December 19	NY Islanders	3–2	Boston	SO	Rask	17,850	21–7–8	50
37	December 21	Nashville	4–3	Boston	OT	Halak	17,850	21–7–9	51
38	December 23	Washington	3–7	Boston		Rask	17,850	22–7–9	53
39	December 27	Boston	3–0	Buffalo		Halak	19,070	23–7–9	55
40	December 29	Buffalo	2–3	Boston		Rask	17,850	24–7–9	57
41	December 31	Boston	2–3	New Jersey	SO	Halak	16,514	24–7–10	58

January: 6–3–2 (Home: 3–1–1; Road: 3–2–1)
#	Date	Visitor	Score	Home	OT	Decision	Attendance	Record	Pts	Recap
42	January 2	Columbus	2–1	Boston	OT	Rask	17,850	24–7–11	59
43	January 4	Edmonton	4–1	Boston		Halak	17,850	24–8–11	59
44	January 7	Boston	6–2	Nashville		Rask	17,623	25–8–11	61
45	January 9	Winnipeg	4–5	Boston		Halak	17,850	26–8–11	63
46	January 11	Boston	3–2	NY Islanders	OT	Rask	14,962	27–8–11	65
47	January 13	Boston	5–6	Philadelphia	SO	Halak	19,246	27–8–12	66
48	January 14	Boston	0–3	Columbus		Halak	17,349	27–9–12	66
49	January 16	Pittsburgh	1–4	Boston		Halak	17,850	28–9–12	68
50	January 19	Boston	3–4	Pittsburgh		Halak	18,655	28–10–12	68
51	January 21	Vegas	2–3	Boston		Halak	17,850	29–10–12	70
52	January 31	Boston	2–1	Winnipeg		Rask	15,325	30–10–12	72

February: 11–3–0 (Home: 5–1–0; Road: 6–2–0)
#	Date	Visitor	Score	Home	OT	Decision	Attendance	Record	Pts	Recap
53	February 1	Boston	6–1	Minnesota		Halak	18,009	31–10–12	74
54	February 4	Vancouver	0–4	Boston		Rask	17,850	32–10–12	76
55	February 5	Boston	2–1	Chicago	OT	Halak	21,472	33–10–12	78
56	February 8	Arizona	2–4	Boston		Rask	17,850	34–10–12	80
57	February 9	Boston	1–3	Detroit		Rask	19,515	34–11–12	80
58	February 12	Montreal	1–4	Boston		Rask	17,850	35–11–12	82
59	February 15	Detroit	1–4	Boston		Rask	17,850	36–11–12	84
60	February 16	Boston	3–1	NY Rangers		Halak	18,006	37–11–12	86
61	February 19	Boston	2–1	Edmonton	OT	Rask	17,804	38–11–12	88
62	February 21	Boston	4–3	Calgary		Halak	19,289	39–11–12	90
63	February 22	Boston	3–9	Vancouver		Rask	18,871	39–12–12	90
64	February 25	Calgary	5–2	Boston		Rask	17,850	39–13–12	90
65	February 27	Dallas	3–4	Boston		Halak	17,850	40–13–12	92
66	February 29	Boston	4–0	NY Islanders		Rask	13,917	41–13–12	94

March: 3–1–0 (Home: 0–1–0; Road: 3–0–0)
#	Date	Visitor	Score	Home	OT	Decision	Attendance	Record	Pts	Recap
67	March 3	Boston	2–1	Tampa Bay		Rask	19,092	42–13–12	96
68	March 5	Boston	2–1	Florida	OT	Halak	15,577	43–13–12	98
69	March 7	Tampa Bay	5–3	Boston		Rask	17,850	43–14–12	98
70	March 10	Boston	2–0	Philadelphia		Rask	19,689	44–14–12	100

Cancelled games
#	Date	Visitor	Home
71	March 13	Boston	Buffalo
72	March 14	Toronto	Boston
73	March 16	Columbus	Boston
74	March 18	Boston	Anaheim
75	March 19	Boston	Los Angeles
76	March 21	Boston	San Jose
77	March 24	Detroit	Boston
78	March 26	Ottawa	Boston
79	March 28	Florida	Boston
80	March 31	Boston	Carolina
81	April 2	Boston	St. Louis
82	April 4	Carolina	Boston

Legend: Win (2 points) Loss (0 points) Overtime/shootout loss (1 point)

=== Playoffs ===
The Bruins played in a round-robin tournament to determine their seed for the playoffs. Boston finished with a 0–3–0 record to clinch the fourth seed for the playoffs.

The Bruins faced the Carolina Hurricanes in the first round, defeating them in five games.

In the second round, the Bruins faced the Tampa Bay Lightning, and lost in five games.

2020 Stanley Cup playoffs

Eastern Conference Seeding Round-robin
#	Date	Visitor	Score	Home	OT	Decision	Record	Points	Recap
1	August 2	Philadelphia	4–1	Boston		Halak	0–1–0	0
2	August 5	Tampa Bay	3–2	Boston		Rask	0–2–0	0
3	August 9	Boston	1–2	Washington		Rask	0–3–0	0

Eastern Conference First Round vs. (5) Carolina Hurricanes: Boston won 4–1
#	Date	Visitor	Score	Home	OT	Decision	Series	Recap
1	August 12	Carolina	3–4	Boston	2OT	Rask	1–0
2	August 13	Carolina	3–2	Boston		Rask	1–1
3	August 15	Boston	3–1	Carolina		Halak	2–1
4	August 17	Boston	4–3	Carolina		Halak	3–1
5	August 19	Carolina	1–2	Boston		Halak	4–1

Eastern Conference Second Round vs. (2) Tampa Bay Lightning: Tampa Bay won 4–1
#	Date	Visitor	Score	Home	OT	Decision	Series	Recap
1	August 23	Boston	3–2	Tampa Bay		Halak	1–0
2	August 25	Boston	3–4	Tampa Bay	OT	Halak	1–1
3	August 26	Tampa Bay	7–1	Boston		Halak	1–2
4	August 29	Tampa Bay	3–1	Boston		Halak	1–3
5	August 31	Boston	2–3	Tampa Bay	2OT	Halak	1–4

Legend: Win (2 points) Loss (0 points) Overtime/shootout loss (1 point)

== Player statistics ==
=== Skaters ===
Regular season
Player	GP	G	A	Pts	+/−	PIM
David Pastrnak	70	48	47	95	21	40
Brad Marchand	70	28	59	87	25	82
Patrice Bergeron	61	31	25	56	23	28
Torey Krug	61	9	40	49	−4	33
David Krejci	61	13	30	43	14	23
Charlie Coyle	70	16	21	37	9	21
Jake DeBrusk	65	19	16	35	−1	14
Charlie McAvoy	67	5	27	32	24	41
Sean Kuraly	69	6	17	23	−2	34
Danton Heinen^{‡}	58	7	15	22	3	8
Matt Grzelcyk	68	4	17	21	15	34
Anders Bjork	58	9	10	19	5	10
Brandon Carlo	67	4	15	19	16	33
Zdeno Chara	68	5	9	14	26	60
Chris Wagner	67	6	4	10	−8	47
Joakim Nordstrom	48	4	3	7	−6	17
Par Lindholm	40	3	3	6	6	4
Brett Ritchie	27	2	4	6	−3	21
Karson Kuhlman	25	1	5	6	3	13
John Moore	24	2	1	3	−2	11
David Backes^{‡}	16	1	2	3	−2	16
Connor Clifton	31	2	0	2	4	12
Jeremy Lauzon	19	1	1	2	5	29
Nick Ritchie^{†}	7	1	1	2	−2	19
Steven Kampfer	10	0	2	2	2	2
Zachary Senyshyn	4	0	2	2	1	0
Ondrej Kase^{†}	6	0	1	1	0	4
Jack Studnicka	2	0	1	1	2	2
Peter Cehlarik	3	0	1	1	−1	2
Brendan Gaunce	1	0	1	1	1	2
Trent Frederic	2	0	0	0	−1	0
Urho Vaakanainen	5	0	0	0	2	0
Paul Carey	1	0	0	0	−1	0
Anton Blidh	7	0	0	0	−1	0
Cameron Hughes	1	0	0	0	−1	0

Playoffs
Player	GP	G	A	Pts	+/−	PIM
Brad Marchand	13	7	5	12	0	2
David Krejci	13	4	8	12	−5	6
David Pastrnak	10	3	7	10	−3	2
Patrice Bergeron	13	2	6	8	2	6
Torey Krug	13	0	6	6	−6	22
Charlie Coyle	13	3	2	5	−4	2
Jake DeBrusk	13	4	0	4	−3	2
Charlie McAvoy	13	1	3	4	−6	24
Ondrej Kase	11	0	4	4	−1	2
Chris Wagner	12	2	1	3	−5	4
Sean Kuraly	10	1	2	3	−4	4
Connor Clifton	8	1	2	3	−1	6
Joakim Nordstrom	13	0	2	2	−6	2
Zdeno Chara	13	0	2	2	−4	8
Nick Ritchie	8	1	0	1	−3	16
Matt Grzelcyk	12	0	1	1	−5	4
Anders Bjork	10	0	1	1	−3	6
Brandon Carlo	13	0	1	1	0	8
Jack Studnicka	5	0	0	0	−1	2
Karson Kuhlman	5	0	0	0	−2	0
Par Lindholm	6	0	0	0	−2	2
Jeremy Lauzon	6	0	0	0	−3	18
John Moore	1	0	0	0	−1	0

=== Goaltenders ===
Regular season
Player	GP	GS	TOI	W	L	OT	GA	GAA	SA	SV%	SO	G	A	PIM
Tuukka Rask	41	41	2,401:47	26	8	6	85	2.12	1,189	.929	5	0	2	0
Jaroslav Halak	31	29	1,833:22	18	6	6	73	2.39	905	.919	3	0	2	0

Playoffs
Player	GP	GS	TOI	W	L	OT	GA	GAA	SA	SV%	SO	G	A	PIM
Jaroslav Halak	9	9	543:12	4	5	0	25	2.76	256	.902	0	0	0	0
Tuukka Rask	4	4	257:10	1	3	0	11	2.57	114	.904	0	0	0	0
Dan Vladar	1	0	28:42	0	0	0	3	6.27	15	.800	0	0	0	0

^{†}Denotes player spent time with another team before joining the Bruins. Stats reflect time with the Bruins only.
^{‡}Denotes player was traded mid-season. Stats reflect time with the Bruins only.
Bold/italics denotes franchise record.
