= 2019–20 Washington Capitals season =

NHL ice hockey team season

2019–20 Washington Capitals
- Metropolitan Division champions
- Division: 1st Metropolitan
- Conference: 3rd Eastern
- 2019–20 record: 41–20–8
- Home record: 18–10–5
- Road record: 23–10–3
- Goals for: 240
- Goals against: 215

Team information
- General manager: Brian MacLellan
- Coach: Todd Reirden
- Captain: Alexander Ovechkin
- Alternate captains: Nicklas Backstrom; John Carlson
- Arena: Capital One Arena
- Average attendance: 18,570
- Minor league affiliates: Hershey Bears (AHL); South Carolina Stingrays (ECHL)

Team leaders
- Goals: Alexander Ovechkin (48)
- Assists: John Carlson (60)
- Points: John Carlson (75)
- Penalty minutes: Tom Wilson (93)
- Plus/minus: Michal Kempny (+19)
- Wins: Braden Holtby (25)
- Goals against average: Ilya Samsonov (2.55)

The 2019–20 Washington Capitals season was the 46th season for the National Hockey League (NHL) franchise that was established on June 11, 1974. The Capitals entered the season as the 4-time defending Metropolitan Division champions. They would go on to win the division for the fifth year in a row.

The season was suspended by the league officials on March 12, 2020, after several other professional and collegiate sports organizations followed suit as a result of the COVID-19 pandemic. On May 26, the NHL regular season was officially declared over with the remaining games being cancelled. The Capitals advanced to the playoffs, but were eliminated by the New York Islanders in the first round in five games.

== Standings ==
=== Divisional standings ===
Metropolitan Division
Pos	Team	GP	W	L	OTL	RW	GF	GA	GD	Pts
1	Washington Capitals	69	41	20	8	31	240	215	+25	90
2	Philadelphia Flyers	69	41	21	7	31	232	196	+36	89
3	Pittsburgh Penguins	69	40	23	6	29	224	196	+28	86
4	Carolina Hurricanes	68	38	25	5	27	222	193	+29	81
5	Columbus Blue Jackets	70	33	22	15	25	180	187	−7	81
6	New York Islanders	68	35	23	10	24	192	193	−1	80
7	New York Rangers	70	37	28	5	31	234	222	+12	79
8	New Jersey Devils	69	28	29	12	22	189	230	−41	68

Source: National Hockey League

=== Eastern Conference ===
Pos	Team	GP	W	L	OTL	RW	GF	GA	GD	PCT	Qualification
1	Boston Bruins	70	44	14	12	38	227	174	+53	.714	Advance to Seeding round-robin tournament
2	Tampa Bay Lightning	70	43	21	6	35	245	195	+50	.657	Advance to Seeding round-robin tournament
3	Washington Capitals	69	41	20	8	31	240	215	+25	.652	Advance to Seeding round-robin tournament
4	Philadelphia Flyers	69	41	21	7	31	232	196	+36	.645	Advance to Seeding round-robin tournament
5	Pittsburgh Penguins	69	40	23	6	29	224	196	+28	.623	Advance to 2020 Stanley Cup playoffs qualifying round
6	Carolina Hurricanes	68	38	25	5	27	222	193	+29	.596	Advance to 2020 Stanley Cup playoffs qualifying round
7	New York Islanders	68	35	23	10	24	192	193	−1	.588	Advance to 2020 Stanley Cup playoffs qualifying round
8	Toronto Maple Leafs	70	36	25	9	28	238	227	+11	.579	Advance to 2020 Stanley Cup playoffs qualifying round
9	Columbus Blue Jackets	70	33	22	15	25	180	187	−7	.579	Advance to 2020 Stanley Cup playoffs qualifying round
10	Florida Panthers	69	35	26	8	30	231	228	+3	.565	Advance to 2020 Stanley Cup playoffs qualifying round
11	New York Rangers	70	37	28	5	31	234	222	+12	.564	Advance to 2020 Stanley Cup playoffs qualifying round
12	Montreal Canadiens	71	31	31	9	19	212	221	−9	.500	Advance to 2020 Stanley Cup playoffs qualifying round
13	Buffalo Sabres	69	30	31	8	22	195	217	−22	.493	
14	New Jersey Devils	69	28	29	12	22	189	230	−41	.493	
15	Ottawa Senators	71	25	34	12	18	191	243	−52	.437	
16	Detroit Red Wings	71	17	49	5	13	145	267	−122	.275	

Source: National Hockey League

== Schedule and results ==
=== Preseason ===
The preseason schedule was published on June 17, 2019.

2019 preseason game log: 5–1–0 (Home: 3–0–0; Road: 2–1–0)

Game	Date	Opponent	Score	Record
1	September 16	Chicago	4–3 OT	1–0–0
2	September 18	St. Louis	3–2	2–0–0
3	September 21	Carolina	3–2	3–0–0
4	September 25	@ Chicago	6–0	4–0–0
5	September 27	@ St. Louis	3–4	4–1–0
6	September 29	@ Carolina	4–3	5–1–0

=== Regular season ===
The regular season schedule was published on June 25, 2019.

2019–20 game log
October: 9–2–3, 21 points (Home: 2–1–2; Road: 7–1–1)

Game	Date	Opponent	Score	OT	Decision	Location	Attendance	Record	Points	Recap
1	October 2	@ St. Louis	3–2	OT	Holtby	Enterprise Center	18,096	1–0–0	2	
2	October 4	@ NY Islanders	2–1		Samsonov	Nassau Coliseum	13,917	2–0–0	4	
3	October 5	Carolina	2–3	OT	Holtby	Capital One Arena	18,506	2–0–1	5	
4	October 8	Dallas	3–4	OT	Holtby	Capital One Arena	18,573	2–0–2	6	
5	October 10	@ Nashville	5–6		Holtby	Bridgestone Arena	17,386	2–1–2	6	
6	October 12	@ Dallas	4–1		Samsonov	American Airlines Center	18,532	3–1–2	8	
7	October 14	Colorado	3–6		Samsonov	Capital One Arena	18,573	3–2–2	8	
8	October 16	Toronto	4–3		Samsonov	Capital One Arena	18,573	4–2–2	10	
9	October 18	NY Rangers	5–2		Holtby	Capital One Arena	18,573	5–2–2	12	
10	October 20	@ Chicago	5–3		Holtby	United Center	21,187	6–2–2	14	
11	October 22	@ Calgary	5–3		Holtby	Scotiabank Saddledome	18,002	7–2–2	16	
12	October 24	@ Edmonton	3–4	OT	Holtby	Rogers Place	17,144	7–2–3	17	
13	October 25	@ Vancouver	6–5	SO	Samsonov	Rogers Arena	18,871	8–2–3	19	
14	October 29	@ Toronto	4–3	OT	Holtby	Scotiabank Arena	19,258	9–2–3	21	

November: 10–2–2, 22 points (Home: 6–1–2; Road: 4–1–0)

Game	Date	Opponent	Score	OT	Decision	Location	Attendance	Record	Points	Recap
15	November 1	Buffalo	6–1		Holtby	Capital One Arena	18,573	10–2–3	23	
16	November 3	Calgary	4–2		Samsonov	Capital One Arena	18,573	11–2–3	25	
17	November 7	@ Florida	5–4	OT	Holtby	BB&T Center	14,085	12–2–3	27	
18	November 9	Vegas	5–2		Holtby	Capital One Arena	18,573	13–2–3	29	
19	November 11	Arizona	3–4	SO	Samsonov	Capital One Arena	18,573	13–2–4	30	
20	November 13	@ Philadelphia	2–1	SO	Holtby	Wells Fargo Center	18,159	14–2–4	32	
21	November 15	Montreal	2–5		Samsonov	Capital One Arena	18,573	14–3–4	32	
22	November 16	@ Boston	3–2	SO	Holtby	TD Garden	17,850	15–3–4	34	
23	November 18	Anaheim	5–2		Holtby	Capital One Arena	18,573	16–3–4	36	
24	November 20	@ NY Rangers	1–4		Holtby	Madison Square Garden	17,239	16–4–4	36	
25	November 23	Vancouver	1–2	SO	Holtby	Capital One Arena	18,573	16–4–5	37	
26	November 27	Florida	4–3		Holtby	Capital One Arena	18,573	17–4–5	39	
27	November 29	Tampa Bay	4–3	OT	Holtby	Capital One Arena	18,573	18–4–5	41	
28	November 30	@ Detroit	5–2		Samsonov	Little Caesars Arena	19,190	19–4–5	43	

December: 8–5–0, 16 points (Home: 3–2–0; Road: 5–3–0)

Game	Date	Opponent	Score	OT	Decision	Location	Attendance	Record	Points	Recap
29	December 3	@ San Jose	5–2		Holtby	SAP Center	17,562	20–4–5	45	
30	December 4	@ Los Angeles	3–1		Samsonov	Staples Center	16,102	21–4–5	47	
31	December 6	@ Anaheim	3–2		Holtby	Honda Center	15,945	22–4–5	49	
32	December 9	Columbus	2–5		Holtby	Capital One Arena	18,573	22–5–5	49	
33	December 11	Boston	3–2		Holtby	Capital One Arena	18,573	23–5–5	51	
34	December 14	@ Tampa Bay	5–2		Samsonov	Amalie Arena	19,092	24–5–5	53	
35	December 16	@ Columbus	0–3		Holtby	Nationwide Arena	16,602	24–6–5	53	
36	December 20	@ New Jersey	6–3		Samsonov	Prudential Center	15,021	25–6–5	55	
37	December 21	Tampa Bay	3–1		Holtby	Capital One Arena	18,573	26–6–5	57	
38	December 23	@ Boston	3–7		Holtby	TD Garden	17,850	26–7–5	57	
39	December 27	Columbus	2–1	OT	Samsonov	Capital One Arena	18,573	27–7–5	59	
40	December 28	@ Carolina	4–6		Holtby	PNC Arena	18,680	27–8–5	59	
41	December 31	NY Islanders	3–4		Holtby	Capital One Arena	18,573	27–9–5	59	

January: 8–3–0, 16 points (Home: 4–2–0; Road: 4–1–0)

Game	Date	Opponent	Score	OT	Decision	Location	Attendance	Record	Points	Recap
42	January 3	@ Carolina	4–3		Samsonov	PNC Arena	18,680	28–9–5	61	
43	January 5	San Jose	5–4	OT	Holtby	Capital One Arena	18,573	29–9–5	63	
44	January 7	Ottawa	6–1		Samsonov	Capital One Arena	18,573	30–9–5	65	
45	January 8	@ Philadelphia	2–3		Holtby	Wells Fargo Center	18,595	30–10–5	65	
46	January 11	New Jersey	1–5		Holtby	Capital One Arena	18,573	30–11–5	65	
47	January 13	Carolina	2–0		Samsonov	Capital One Arena	18,573	31–11–5	67	
48	January 16	New Jersey	5–2		Samsonov	Capital One Arena	18,573	32–11–5	69	
49	January 18	@ NY Islanders	6–4		Samsonov	Nassau Coliseum	13,917	33–11–5	71	
50	January 27	@ Montreal	4–2		Holtby	Bell Centre	21,302	34–11–5	73	
51	January 29	Nashville	4–5		Holtby	Capital One Arena	18,573	34–12–5	73	
52	January 31	@ Ottawa	5–3		Samsonov	Canadian Tire Centre	14,279	35–12–5	75	

February: 4–7–1, 9 points (Home: 3–3–1; Road: 1–4–0)

Game	Date	Opponent	Score	OT	Decision	Location	Attendance	Record	Points	Recap
53	February 2	Pittsburgh	3–4		Samsonov	Capital One Arena	18,573	35–13–5	75	
54	February 4	Los Angeles	4–2		Holtby	Capital One Arena	18,573	36–13–5	77	
55	February 8	Philadelphia	2–7		Holtby	Capital One Arena	18,573	36–14–5	77	
56	February 10	NY Islanders	3–5		Samsonov	Capital One Arena	18,573	36–15–5	77	
57	February 13	@ Colorado	3–2		Holtby	Pepsi Center	18,146	37–15–5	79	
58	February 15	@ Arizona	1–3		Holtby	Gila River Arena	17,139	37–16–5	79	
59	February 17	@ Vegas	2–3		Holtby	T-Mobile Arena	18,399	37–17–5	79	
60	February 20	Montreal	3–4	OT	Holtby	Capital One Arena	18,573	37–17–6	80	
61	February 22	@ New Jersey	2–3		Samsonov	Prudential Center	16,514	37–18–6	80	
62	February 23	Pittsburgh	5–3		Holtby	Capital One Arena	18,573	38–18–6	82	
63	February 25	Winnipeg	4–3	SO	Holtby	Capital One Arena	18,573	39–18–6	84	
64	February 27	@ Winnipeg	0–3		Samsonov	Bell MTS Place	15,325	39–19–6	84	

March: 2–1–2, 6 points (Home: 0–1–0; Road: 2–0–2)

Game	Date	Opponent	Score	OT	Decision	Location	Attendance	Record	Points	Recap
65	March 1	@ Minnesota	4–3		Holtby	Xcel Energy Center	17,388	40–19–6	86	
66	March 4	Philadelphia	2–5		Holtby	Capital One Arena	18,573	40–20–6	86	
67	March 5	@ NY Rangers	5–6	OT	Samsonov	Madison Square Garden	17,277	40–20–7	87	
68	March 7	@ Pittsburgh	5–2		Holtby	PPG Paints Arena	18,656	41–20–7	89	
69	March 9	@ Buffalo	2–3	SO	Holtby	KeyBank Center	16,539	41–20–8	90	

Cancelled games

Game	Date	Opponent	Location
70	March 12	Detroit	Capital One Arena
71	March 14	Chicago	Capital One Arena
72	March 16	Edmonton	Capital One Arena
73	March 19	@ Columbus	Nationwide Arena
74	March 20	Ottawa	Capital One Arena
75	March 22	@ Pittsburgh	PPG Paints Arena
76	March 24	St. Louis	Capital One Arena
77	March 26	NY Rangers	Capital One Arena
78	March 28	@ Detroit	Little Caesars Arena
79	March 30	@ Buffalo	KeyBank Center
80	March 31	Toronto	Capital One Arena
81	April 2	Minnesota	Capital One Arena
82	April 4	@ Florida	BB&T Center

Win (2 Points) Loss (0 points) Overtime/shootout loss (1 point)

=== Playoffs ===
The Capitals played in a round-robin tournament to determine their seed for the playoffs. Washington finished with a 1–1–1 record to clinch the third seed for the playoffs.

The Capitals were defeated by the New York Islanders in the first round in five games.

2020 Stanley Cup playoffs
Eastern Conference Seeding Round-robin

Game	Date	Opponent	Score	OT	Decision	Location	Record	Points	Recap
1	August 3	@ Tampa Bay	2–3	SO	Holtby	Scotiabank Arena	0–0–1	1	
2	August 6	@ Philadelphia	1–3		Holtby	Scotiabank Arena	0–1–1	1	
3	August 9	Boston	2–1		Holtby	Scotiabank Arena	1–1–1	3	

Eastern Conference First Round vs. (6) New York Islanders: New York won 4–1

Game	Date	Opponent	Score	OT	Decision	Location	Series	Recap
1	August 12	NY Islanders	2–4		Holtby	Scotiabank Arena	0–1	
2	August 14	NY Islanders	2–5		Holtby	Scotiabank Arena	0–2	
3	August 16	@ NY Islanders	1–2	OT	Holtby	Scotiabank Arena	0–3	
4	August 18	@ NY Islanders	3–2		Holtby	Scotiabank Arena	1–3	
5	August 20	NY Islanders	0–4		Holtby	Scotiabank Arena	1–4	

Win (2 Points) Loss (0 points) Overtime/shootout loss (1 point)

== Player statistics ==
=== Skaters ===
Regular season
Player	GP	G	A	Pts	+/−	PIM
John Carlson	69	15	60	75	12	26
Alexander Ovechkin	68	48	19	67	−12	30
Nicklas Backstrom	61	12	42	54	−1	14
Jakub Vrana	69	25	27	52	3	18
Evgeny Kuznetsov	63	19	33	52	−2	40
T. J. Oshie	69	26	23	49	4	26
Tom Wilson	68	21	23	44	−3	93
Lars Eller	69	16	23	39	3	48
Dmitry Orlov	69	4	23	27	5	36
Carl Hagelin	58	8	17	25	12	16
Richard Panik	59	9	13	22	16	36
Michal Kempny	58	3	15	18	19	22
Garnet Hathaway	66	9	7	16	6	79
Nic Dowd	56	7	8	15	11	28
Radko Gudas	63	2	13	15	15	40
Brendan Leipsic	61	3	8	11	3	13
Travis Boyd	24	3	7	10	9	2
Jonas Siegenthaler	64	2	7	9	11	43
Nick Jensen	68	0	8	8	1	13
Chandler Stephenson^{‡}	24	3	1	4	5	6
Ilya Kovalchuk^{†}	7	1	3	4	0	4
Martin Fehervary	6	0	1	1	−2	6
Michael Sgarbossa	2	0	0	0	0	0
Brenden Dillon^{†}	10	0	0	0	−2	21
Beck Malenstyn	3	0	0	0	−1	0
Tyler Lewington	6	0	0	0	−2	17
Christian Djoos^{‡}	2	0	0	0	1	0

Playoffs
Player	GP	G	A	Pts	+/−	PIM
John Carlson	5	0	6	6	−11	2
Alexander Ovechkin	8	4	1	5	−1	2
Evgeny Kuznetsov	8	3	2	5	−4	4
T. J. Oshie	8	3	0	3	−7	13
Tom Wilson	8	1	2	3	−5	23
Dmitry Orlov	8	0	3	3	−1	4
Radko Gudas	5	0	2	2	−1	2
Richard Panik	8	1	0	1	−2	6
Travis Boyd	4	1	0	1	0	0
Nicklas Backstrom	5	0	1	1	−2	0
Lars Eller	5	0	1	1	−5	2
Brenden Dillon	8	0	1	1	0	8
Ilya Kovalchuk	8	0	1	1	0	2
Carl Hagelin	8	0	1	1	−4	2
Michal Kempny	5	0	1	1	−2	4
Jakub Vrana	8	0	0	0	−7	2
Nick Jensen	8	0	0	0	−1	0
Nic Dowd	8	0	0	0	−4	4
Garnet Hathaway	8	0	0	0	−3	12
Jonas Siegenthaler	7	0	0	0	−7	0
Martin Fehervary	2	0	0	0	0	0
Brian Pinho	2	0	0	0	−1	0

=== Goaltenders ===
Regular season
Player	GP	GS	TOI	W	L	OT	GA	GAA	SA	SV%	SO	G	A	PIM
Braden Holtby	48	47	2,743:10	25	14	6	142	3.11	1,385	.897	0	0	1	4
Ilya Samsonov	26	22	1,411:02	16	6	2	60	2.55	689	.913	1	0	0	2

Playoffs
Player	GP	GS	TOI	W	L	OT	GA	GAA	SA	SV%	SO	G	A	PIM
Braden Holtby	8	8	482:36	2	5	1	20	2.49	213	.906	0	0	1	0

^{†}Denotes player spent time with another team before joining the Capitals. Stats reflect time with the Capitals only.
^{‡}Denotes player was traded mid-season. Stats reflect time with the Capitals only.
Bold/italics denotes franchise record.

== Transactions ==
The Capitals have been involved in the following transactions during the 2019–20 season.

=== Trades ===
Date	Details		Ref
June 22, 2019	To New Jersey Devils 4th-round pick in 2019; BUF's 5th-round pick in 2019	To Washington Capitals SJS's 3rd-round pick in 2019	
June 22, 2019	To San Jose Sharks 7th-round pick in 2019; 7th-round pick in 2020	To Washington Capitals 5th-round pick in 2019	
June 28, 2019	To Colorado Avalanche Andre Burakovsky	To Washington Capitals Scott Kosmachuk; 2nd-round pick in 2020; ARI's 3rd-round pick in 2020	
December 2, 2019	To Vegas Golden Knights Chandler Stephenson	To Washington Capitals 5th-round pick in 2021	
February 18, 2020	To San Jose Sharks 2nd-round pick in 2020; Conditional 3rd-round pick in 2021	To Washington Capitals Brenden Dillon	
February 23, 2020	To Montreal Canadiens 3rd-round pick in 2020	To Washington Capitals Ilya Kovalchuk	

=== Free agents ===
Date	Player	Team	Contract term	Ref
July 1, 2019	Riley Barber	to Montreal Canadiens	1-year	
July 1, 2019	Brett Connolly	to Florida Panthers	4-year	
July 1, 2019	Garnet Hathaway	from Calgary Flames	4-year	
July 1, 2019	Brendan Leipsic	from Los Angeles Kings	1-year	
July 1, 2019	Philippe Maillet	from Ontario Reign (AHL)	2-year	
July 1, 2019	Aaron Ness	to Arizona Coyotes	2-year	
July 1, 2019	Richard Panik	from Arizona Coyotes	4-year	
July 1, 2019	Nathan Walker	to St. Louis Blues	1-year	
July 2, 2019	Jayson Megna	to Colorado Avalanche	1-year	
July 16, 2019	Mathias Bau Hansen	to Dornbirn Bulldogs (EBEL)	1-year	
August 17, 2019	Chase Priskie	to Carolina Hurricanes	2-year	
August 22, 2019	Dmitrij Jaskin	from/to Dynamo Moscow (KHL)	1-year	
August 29, 2019	Mason Mitchell	to Rochester Americans (AHL)	-year	
September 4, 2019	Hampus Gustafsson	to Rögle BK (SHL)	1-year	
October 28, 2019	Devante Smith-Pelly	to Kunlun Red Star (KHL)	1-year	

=== Waivers ===
Date	Player	Team	Ref
July 1, 2019		from/to	

=== Contract terminations ===
Date	Player	Via	Ref
July 1, 2019			

=== Retirement ===
Date	Player	Ref
June 25, 2019	Brooks Orpik	

=== Signings ===
Date	Player	Contract term	Ref
June 29, 2019	Michael Sgarbossa	2-year	
July 1, 2019	Vitek Vanecek	3-year	
July 10, 2019	Aliaksei Protas	3-year	
July 11, 2019	Brett Leason	3-year	
July 12, 2019	Connor McMichael	3-year	
July 13, 2019	Colby Williams	1-year	
July 16, 2019	Jakub Vrana	2-year	
July 24, 2019	Christian Djoos	1-year	
July 27, 2019	Chandler Stephenson	1-year	
January 14, 2020	Nicklas Backstrom	5-year	

== Draft picks ==
Below are the Washington Capitals' selections at the 2019 NHL entry draft, which was held on June 21 and 22, 2019, at Rogers Arena in Vancouver, British Columbia.

Round	#	Player	Pos	Nationality	College/Junior/Club team (League)
1	25	Connor McMichael	C	Canada	London Knights (OHL)
2	56	Brett Leason	RW	Canada	Prince Albert Raiders (WHL)
3	91^{1}	Aliaksei Protas	C	Belarus	Prince Albert Raiders (WHL)
5	153^{2}	Martin Has	D	Czech Republic	Tappara U20 (Nuorten SM-liiga)

Notes:

1. The San Jose Sharks' third-round pick went to the Washington Capitals as the result of a trade on June 22, 2019, that sent a fourth-round pick and Buffalo's fifth-round pick both in 2019 (118th and 129th overall) to New Jersey in exchange for this pick.
2. The San Jose Sharks' fifth-round pick went to the Washington Capitals as the result of a trade on June 22, 2019, that sent a seventh-round pick in 2019 (211th overall) and 2020 to San Jose in exchange for this pick.
