= 2019–20 Winnipeg Jets season =

Professional ice hockey team season

2019–20 Winnipeg Jets
- Division: 5th Central
- Conference: 9th Western
- 2019–20 record: 37–28–6
- Home record: 20–14–3
- Road record: 17–14–3
- Goals for: 216
- Goals against: 203

Team information
- General manager: Kevin Cheveldayoff
- Coach: Paul Maurice
- Captain: Blake Wheeler
- Alternate captains: Dustin Byfuglien; Josh Morrissey; Mark Scheifele
- Arena: Bell MTS Place
- Average attendance: 15,794
- Minor league affiliates: Manitoba Moose (AHL); Jacksonville Icemen (ECHL)

Team leaders
- Goals: Kyle Connor (38)
- Assists: Mark Scheifele (44)
- Points: Kyle Connor; Mark Scheifele (73)
- Penalty minutes: Mark Scheifele (45)
- Plus/minus: Nathan Beaulieu (+15)
- Wins: Connor Hellebuyck (31)
- Goals against average: Connor Hellebuyck (2.57)

The 2019–20 Winnipeg Jets season was the 37th season of play for the National Hockey League (NHL) franchise that was established on June 22, 1979, 45th season for the organization overall, and the ninth in Winnipeg, since the franchise relocated from Atlanta prior to the start of the 2011–12 NHL season.

The season was suspended by the league officials on March 12, 2020, after several other professional and collegiate sports organizations followed suit as a result of the ongoing COVID-19 pandemic. On May 26, the NHL regular season was officially declared over with the remaining games being cancelled. The Jets advanced to the playoffs and faced the Calgary Flames in the qualifying round, losing in a four-game series.

== Regular season ==
The Jets lost their season opener 6–4 to the New York Rangers on October 3. The Jets struggled in the opening month of October, compiling a 6–7–0 record with 12 points out of a possible 26 to start the season.

== Standings ==
=== Divisional standings ===
Central Division
Pos	Team	GP	W	L	OTL	RW	GF	GA	GD	Pts
1	St. Louis Blues	71	42	19	10	33	225	193	+32	94
2	Colorado Avalanche	70	42	20	8	37	237	191	+46	92
3	Dallas Stars	69	37	24	8	26	180	177	+3	82
4	Winnipeg Jets	71	37	28	6	30	216	203	+13	80
5	Nashville Predators	69	35	26	8	28	215	217	−2	78
6	Minnesota Wild	69	35	27	7	30	220	220	0	77
7	Chicago Blackhawks	70	32	30	8	23	212	218	−6	72

Source: National Hockey League

=== Western Conference ===
Pos	Team	GP	W	L	OTL	RW	GF	GA	GD	PCT	Qualification
1	St. Louis Blues	71	42	19	10	33	225	193	+32	.662	Advance to Seeding round-robin tournament
2	Colorado Avalanche	70	42	20	8	37	237	191	+46	.657	Advance to Seeding round-robin tournament
3	Vegas Golden Knights	71	39	24	8	30	227	211	+16	.606	Advance to Seeding round-robin tournament
4	Dallas Stars	69	37	24	8	26	180	177	+3	.594	Advance to Seeding round-robin tournament
5	Edmonton Oilers	71	37	25	9	31	225	217	+8	.585	Advance to 2020 Stanley Cup playoffs qualifying round
6	Nashville Predators	69	35	26	8	28	215	217	−2	.565	Advance to 2020 Stanley Cup playoffs qualifying round
7	Vancouver Canucks	69	36	27	6	27	228	217	+11	.565	Advance to 2020 Stanley Cup playoffs qualifying round
8	Calgary Flames	70	36	27	7	25	210	215	−5	.564	Advance to 2020 Stanley Cup playoffs qualifying round
9	Winnipeg Jets	71	37	28	6	30	216	203	+13	.563	Advance to 2020 Stanley Cup playoffs qualifying round
10	Minnesota Wild	69	35	27	7	30	220	220	0	.558	Advance to 2020 Stanley Cup playoffs qualifying round
11	Arizona Coyotes	70	33	29	8	26	195	187	+8	.529	Advance to 2020 Stanley Cup playoffs qualifying round
12	Chicago Blackhawks	70	32	30	8	23	212	218	−6	.514	Advance to 2020 Stanley Cup playoffs qualifying round
13	Anaheim Ducks	71	29	33	9	20	187	226	−39	.472	
14	Los Angeles Kings	70	29	35	6	21	178	212	−34	.457	
15	San Jose Sharks	70	29	36	5	22	182	226	−44	.450	

Source: National Hockey League

Tiebreaking procedures

1. Fewer number of games played (only used during regular season).
2. Greater number of regulation wins (denoted by RW).
3. Greater number of wins in regulation and overtime (excluding shootout wins; denoted by ROW).
4. Greater number of total wins (including shootouts).
5. Greater number of points earned in head-to-head play; if teams played an uneven number of head-to-head games, the result of the first game on the home ice of the team with the extra home game is discarded.
6. Greater goal differential (difference between goals for and goals against).
7. Greater number of goals scored (denoted by GF).

== Schedule and results ==
=== Preseason ===
The preseason schedule was published on June 13, 2019.

2019 preseason game log: 3–3–1 (Home: 2–1–1; Road: 1–2–0)
#	Date	Visitor	Score	Home	OT	Decision	Attendance	Record	Recap
1	September 16	Winnipeg	0–2	Edmonton		Comrie	—	0–1–0
2	September 18	Minnesota	1–4	Winnipeg		Brossoit	15,321	1–1–0
3	September 20	St. Louis	4–3	Winnipeg	OT	Hellebuyck	15,325	1–1–1
4	September 22	Calgary	1–4	Winnipeg		Brossoit	15,325	2–1–1
5	September 24	Winnipeg	0–2	Calgary		Comrie	—	2–2–1
6	September 26	Edmonton	5–3	Winnipeg		Hellebuyck	15,325	2–3–1
7	September 29	Winnipeg	5–4	Minnesota	OT	Brossoit	17,017	3–3–1

=== Regular season ===
The regular season schedule was published on June 25, 2019.

2019–20 game log

October: 6–7–0 (Home: 3–4–0; Road: 3–3–0)
#	Date	Visitor	Score	Home	OT	Decision	Attendance	Record	Pts	Recap
1	October 3	Winnipeg	4–6	NY Rangers		Hellebuyck	18,006	0–1–0	0
2	October 4	Winnipeg	5–4	New Jersey	SO	Brossoit	16,514	1–1–0	2
3	October 6	Winnipeg	1–4	NY Islanders		Brossoit	9,923	1–2–0	2
4	October 8	Winnipeg	4–1	Pittsburgh		Hellebuyck	18,420	2–2–0	4
5	October 10	Minnesota	2–5	Winnipeg		Hellebuyck	15,325	3–2–0	6
6	October 12	Winnipeg	3–2	Chicago	OT	Hellebuyck	21,340	4–2–0	8
7	October 13	Pittsburgh	7–2	Winnipeg		Brossoit	15,325	4–3–0	8
8	October 15	Arizona	4–2	Winnipeg		Hellebuyck	14,764	4–4–0	8
9	October 17	NY Islanders	3–1	Winnipeg		Hellebuyck	15,063	4–5–0	8
10	October 20	Edmonton	0–1	Winnipeg	SO	Hellebuyck	15,321	5–5–0	10
11	October 22	Los Angeles	3–2	Winnipeg		Hellebuyck	15,325	5–6–0	10
12	October 26	Calgary	1–2	Winnipeg	OT	Hellebuyck	33,518 (outdoors)	6–6–0	12
13	October 29	Winnipeg	4–7	Anaheim		Hellebuyck	15,171	6–7–0	12

November: 10–3–1 (Home: 3–1–1; Road: 7–2–0)
#	Date	Visitor	Score	Home	OT	Decision	Attendance	Record	Pts	Recap
14	November 1	Winnipeg	3–2	San Jose		Hellebuyck	15,117	7–7–0	14
15	November 2	Winnipeg	4–3	Vegas	OT	Brossoit	18,276	8–7–0	16
16	November 5	New Jersey	2–1	Winnipeg	SO	Hellebuyck	15,325	8–7–1	17
17	November 8	Vancouver	1–4	Winnipeg		Hellebuyck	15,325	9–7–1	19
18	November 10	Dallas	2–3	Winnipeg	OT	Hellebuyck	15,323	10–7–1	21
19	November 12	Colorado	4–0	Winnipeg		Hellebuyck	15,325	10–8–1	21
20	November 14	Winnipeg	4–3	Florida		Brossoit	12,190	11–8–1	23
21	November 16	Winnipeg	4–3	Tampa Bay		Hellebuyck	19,092	12–8–1	25
22	November 19	Winnipeg	2–1	Nashville		Hellebuyck	17,165	13–8–1	27
23	November 21	Winnipeg	3–5	Dallas		Hellebuyck	18,133	13–9–1	27
24	November 23	Columbus	3–4	Winnipeg		Hellebuyck	15,325	14–9–1	29
25	November 27	Winnipeg	5–1	San Jose		Hellebuyck	16,008	15–9–1	31
26	November 29	Winnipeg	3–0	Anaheim		Hellebuyck	16,301	16–9–1	33
27	November 30	Winnipeg	1–2	Los Angeles		Brossoit	17,249	16–10–1	33

December: 6–5–2 (Home: 4–3–1; Road: 2–2–1)
#	Date	Visitor	Score	Home	OT	Decision	Attendance	Record	Pts	Recap
28	December 3	Dallas	1–5	Winnipeg		Hellebuyck	15,325	17–10–1	35
29	December 5	Winnipeg	2–3	Dallas	OT	Hellebuyck	17,983	17–10–2	36
30	December 8	Anaheim	2–3	Winnipeg		Hellebuyck	15,325	18–10–2	38
31	December 10	Detroit	1–5	Winnipeg		Brossoit	15,325	19–10–2	40
32	December 12	Winnipeg	2–5	Detroit		Hellebuyck	18,832	19–11–2	40
33	December 15	Philadelphia	3–7	Winnipeg		Hellebuyck	15,325	20–11–2	42
34	December 17	Carolina	6–3	Winnipeg		Hellebuyck	15,325	20–12–2	42
35	December 19	Chicago	4–1	Winnipeg		Hellebuyck	15,325	20–13–2	42
36	December 21	Winnipeg	6–0	Minnesota		Hellebuyck	17,319	21–13–2	44
37	December 23	Montreal	6–2	Winnipeg		Brossoit	15,325	21–14–2	44
38	December 27	St. Louis	5–4	Winnipeg	OT	Hellebuyck	15,325	21–14–3	45
39	December 29	Winnipeg	1–4	St. Louis		Hellebuyck	18,096	21–15–3	45
40	December 31	Winnipeg	7–4	Colorado		Hellebuyck	18,147	22–15–3	47

January: 3–8–1 (Home: 1–4–0; Road: 2–4–1)
#	Date	Visitor	Score	Home	OT	Decision	Attendance	Record	Pts	Recap
41	January 2	Toronto	6–3	Winnipeg		Hellebuyck	15,325	22–16–3	47
42	January 4	Winnipeg	2–3	Minnesota	OT	Hellebuyck	17,271	22–16–4	48
43	January 6	Winnipeg	3–2	Montreal		Hellebuyck	20,882	23–16–4	50
44	January 8	Winnipeg	4–3	Toronto	SO	Hellebuyck	19,397	24–16–4	52
45	January 9	Winnipeg	4–5	Boston		Brossoit	17,850	24–17–4	52
46	January 12	Nashville	1–0	Winnipeg		Hellebuyck	15,325	24–18–4	52
47	January 14	Vancouver	0–4	Winnipeg		Hellebuyck	15,325	25–18–4	54
48	January 17	Tampa Bay	7–1	Winnipeg		Hellebuyck	15,325	25–19–4	54
49	January 19	Winnipeg	2–5	Chicago		Hellebuyck	21,487	25–20–4	54
50	January 21	Winnipeg	1–4	Carolina		Hellebuyck	14,607	25–21–4	54
51	January 22	Winnipeg	3–4	Columbus		Brossoit	18,425	25–22–4	54
52	January 31	Boston	2–1	Winnipeg		Brossoit	15,325	25–23–4	54

February: 8–5–2 (Home: 6–2–1; Road: 2–3–1)
#	Date	Visitor	Score	Home	OT	Decision	Attendance	Record	Pts	Recap
53	February 1	St. Louis	2–5	Winnipeg		Hellebuyck	15,325	26–23–4	56
54	February 4	Nashville	2–1	Winnipeg	OT	Hellebuyck	15,325	26–23–5	57
55	February 6	Winnipeg	4–2	St. Louis		Hellebuyck	18,096	27–23–5	59
56	February 8	Ottawa	2–5	Winnipeg		Brossoit	15,325	28–23–5	61
57	February 9	Chicago	2–5	Winnipeg		Hellebuyck	15,325	29–23–5	63
58	February 11	NY Rangers	4–1	Winnipeg		Hellebuyck	15,325	29–24–5	63
59	February 14	San Jose	3–2	Winnipeg		Hellebuyck	15,325	29–25–5	63
60	February 16	Chicago	2–3	Winnipeg		Hellebuyck	15,325	30–25–5	65
61	February 18	Los Angeles	3–6	Winnipeg		Hellebuyck	15,325	31–25–5	67
62	February 20	Winnipeg	5–1	Ottawa		Brossoit	11,183	32–25–5	69
63	February 22	Winnipeg	2–4	Philadelphia		Hellebuyck	19,870	32–26–5	69
64	February 23	Winnipeg	1–2	Buffalo		Hellebuyck	17,805	32–27–5	69
65	February 25	Winnipeg	3–4	Washington	SO	Brossoit	18,573	32–27–6	70
66	February 27	Washington	0–3	Winnipeg		Hellebuyck	15,325	33–27–6	72
67	February 29	Winnipeg	2–3	Edmonton		Hellebuyck	18,347	33–28–6	72

March: 4–0–0 (Home: 3–0–0; Road: 1–0–0)
#	Date	Visitor	Score	Home	OT	Decision	Attendance	Record	Pts	Recap
68	March 3	Buffalo	1–3	Winnipeg		Hellebuyck	15,325	34–28–6	74
69	March 6	Vegas	0–4	Winnipeg		Hellebuyck	15,325	35–28–6	76
70	March 9	Arizona	2–4	Winnipeg		Hellebuyck	15,325	36–28–6	78
71	March 11	Winnipeg	4–2	Edmonton		Hellebuyck	17,165	37–28–6	80

Cancelled games
#	Date	Visitor	Home
72	March 14	Winnipeg	Calgary
73	March 15	Winnipeg	Vancouver
74	March 17	Florida	Winnipeg
75	March 20	Minnesota	Winnipeg
76	March 22	Winnipeg	Dallas
77	March 24	Winnipeg	Nashville
78	March 27	Colorado	Winnipeg
79	March 29	Vegas	Winnipeg
80	March 31	Winnipeg	Calgary
81	April 2	Winnipeg	Colorado
82	April 4	Winnipeg	Arizona

Legend: Win (2 points) Loss (0 points) Overtime/shootout loss (1 point)

=== Playoffs ===
The Jets faced the Calgary Flames in the qualifying round, losing in four games.

2020 Stanley Cup playoffs

Western Conference Qualifying Round vs. (8) Calgary Flames: Calgary won 3–1
#	Date	Visitor	Score	Home	OT	Decision	Series	Recap
1	August 1	Winnipeg	1–4	Calgary		Hellebuyck	0–1
2	August 3	Winnipeg	3–2	Calgary		Hellebuyck	1–1
3	August 4	Calgary	6–2	Winnipeg		Hellebuyck	1–2
4	August 6	Calgary	4–0	Winnipeg		Hellebuyck	1–3

Legend: Win Loss

== Player statistics ==
=== Skaters ===
Regular season
Player	GP	G	A	Pts	+/−	PIM
Kyle Connor	71	38	35	73	4	34
Mark Scheifele	71	29	44	73	2	45
Blake Wheeler	71	22	43	65	1	37
Patrik Laine	68	28	35	63	8	22
Nikolaj Ehlers	71	25	33	58	14	30
Neal Pionk	71	6	39	45	10	32
Josh Morrissey	65	5	26	31	1	24
Jack Roslovic	71	12	17	29	4	12
Andrew Copp	63	10	16	26	−3	10
Tucker Poolman	57	4	12	16	−1	24
Mathieu Perreault	49	7	8	15	−9	10
Adam Lowry	49	4	6	10	−4	23
Luca Sbisa	44	2	8	10	1	37
Dmitry Kulikov	51	2	8	10	−4	32
Mason Appleton	46	5	3	8	−9	20
Nathan Beaulieu	38	1	7	8	15	29
Anthony Bitetto	51	0	8	8	3	32
Jansen Harkins	29	2	5	7	−2	5
Gabriel Bourque	52	2	4	6	−1	7
Logan Shaw	35	3	2	5	0	0
Bryan Little	7	2	3	5	4	2
Ville Heinola	8	1	4	5	3	4
Cody Eakin^{†}	8	1	4	5	6	0
Sami Niku	17	0	5	5	−2	12
Nick Shore^{†}	42	1	2	3	−1	8
David Gustafsson	22	1	0	1	−2	0
Carl Dahlstrom	15	0	1	1	−4	6
C. J. Suess	1	0	0	0	−1	0
Dylan DeMelo^{†}	10	0	0	0	1	6
Mark Letestu	7	0	0	0	0	0
Joona Luoto	16	0	0	0	−3	2
Andrei Chibisov	2	0	0	0	0	0

Playoffs
Player	GP	G	A	Pts	+/−	PIM
Adam Lowry	4	1	2	3	0	2
Nikolaj Ehlers	4	2	0	2	−2	2
Andrew Copp	4	2	0	2	−2	4
Dmitry Kulikov	4	0	2	2	−1	4
Jack Roslovic	4	0	2	2	−1	0
Neal Pionk	4	0	2	2	−6	0
Jansen Harkins	3	1	0	1	−2	4
Nathan Beaulieu	4	0	1	1	1	7
Josh Morrissey	4	0	1	1	−4	4
Kyle Connor	4	0	1	1	−4	0
Blake Wheeler	4	0	1	1	−5	5
Patrik Laine	1	0	0	0	−1	0
Mark Scheifele	1	0	0	0	0	0
Nick Shore	4	0	0	0	−4	2
Cody Eakin	4	0	0	0	−4	4
Mason Appleton	1	0	0	0	1	0
Tucker Poolman	4	0	0	0	0	2
Logan Shaw	3	0	0	0	−1	0
Dylan DeMelo	4	0	0	0	0	2
Gabriel Bourque	3	0	0	0	−1	0
Mathieu Perreault	4	0	0	0	−3	2

=== Goaltenders ===
Regular season
Player	GP	GS	TOI	W	L	OT	GA	GAA	SA	SV%	SO	G	A	PIM
Connor Hellebuyck	58	56	3,268:33	31	21	5	140	2.57	1,796	.922	6	0	2	0
Laurent Brossoit	19	15	987:53	6	7	1	54	3.28	512	.895	0	0	0	0

Playoffs
Player	GP	GS	TOI	W	L	GA	GAA	SA	SV%	SO	G	A	PIM
Connor Hellebuyck	4	4	236:32	1	3	12	3.04	125	.904	0	0	0	0

^{†}Denotes player spent time with another team before joining the Jets. Stats reflect time with the Jets only.
^{‡}Denotes player was traded mid-season. Stats reflect time with the Jets only.
Bold/italics denotes franchise record.
