= Derek Forbort =

American ice hockey player (born 1992)

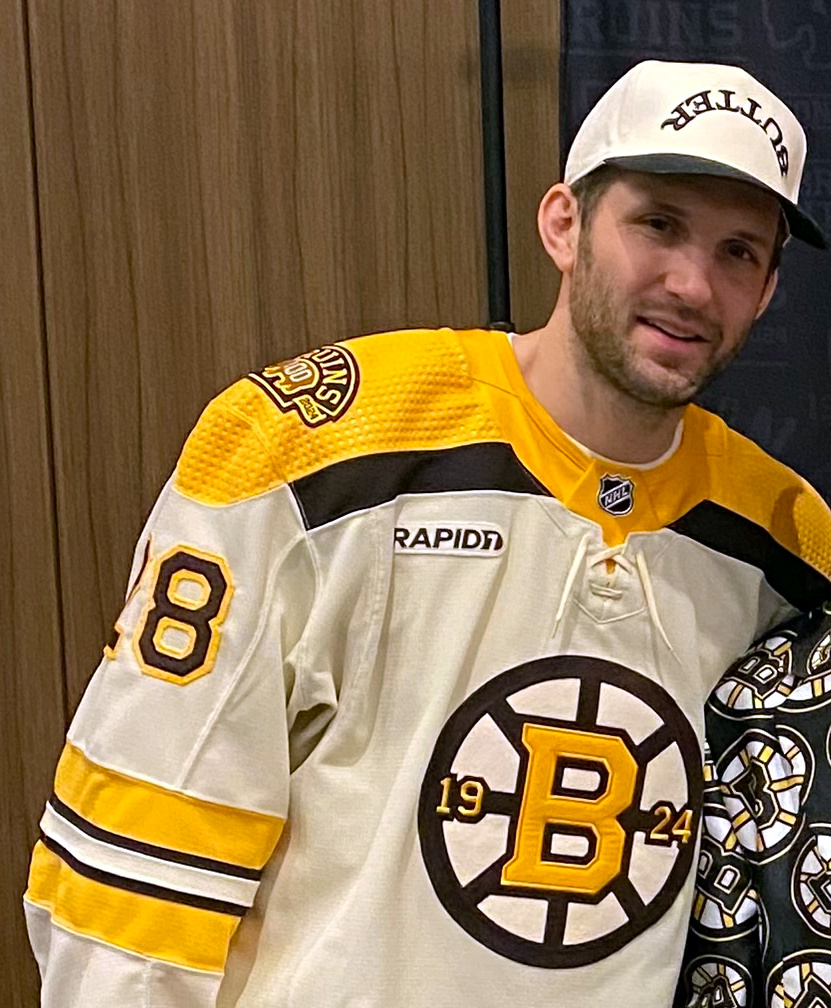
- Forbort with the Boston Bruins in 2023
- Born: March 4, 1992 (age 34) Duluth, Minnesota, U.S.
- Height: 6 ft 4 in (193 cm)
- Weight: 219 lb (99 kg; 15 st 9 lb)
- Position: Defense
- Shoots: Left
- team Former teams: Free agent Los Angeles Kings; Calgary Flames; Winnipeg Jets; Boston Bruins; Vancouver Canucks
- NHL draft: 15th overall, 2010; Los Angeles Kings
- Playing career: 2013–present

Derek Forbort (born March 4, 1992) is an American professional ice hockey defenseman who is currently an unrestricted free agent. He previously played in the National Hockey League (NHL) for the Los Angeles Kings, Calgary Flames, Winnipeg Jets, Boston Bruins and Vancouver Canucks. He was originally selected by the Kings, 15th overall, in the 2010 NHL entry draft.

== Playing career ==
Forbort played his junior season of high school hockey for Duluth East High School in 2008–09, finishing with 28 points in 21 games, and was named a regional All-Star. He completed the season by playing nine games with the USA Hockey National Team Development Program (USNTDP) in the United States Hockey League (USHL). He played his first full season with the USNTDP in 2009–10, scoring 4 goals and 14 points in 26 USHL league games, and 25 points overall in 56 games with the development team.

He then began his freshman season for the University of North Dakota for the 2010–11 season. He played with the American team at the 2010 IIHF World U18 Championships, recording two assists and a +9 rating, en route to winning a gold medal. Forbort had committed to play for the University of North Dakota men's ice hockey team in the National Collegiate Athletic Association in 2010.

=== Professional ===
Forbort was highly regarded by scouts and was projected to become a two-way defenseman in the National Hockey League (NHL). The NHL Central Scouting Bureau ranked Forbort as the ninth best North American skater for the 2010 NHL entry draft, an improvement on his midterm ranking of 11th. International Scouting Services named him tenth overall. Expected to be a first round selection, Forbort was taken 15th overall by the Los Angeles Kings.

==== Los Angeles Kings ====
On April 5, 2013, Forbort signed a three-year entry-level contract with the Los Angeles Kings.

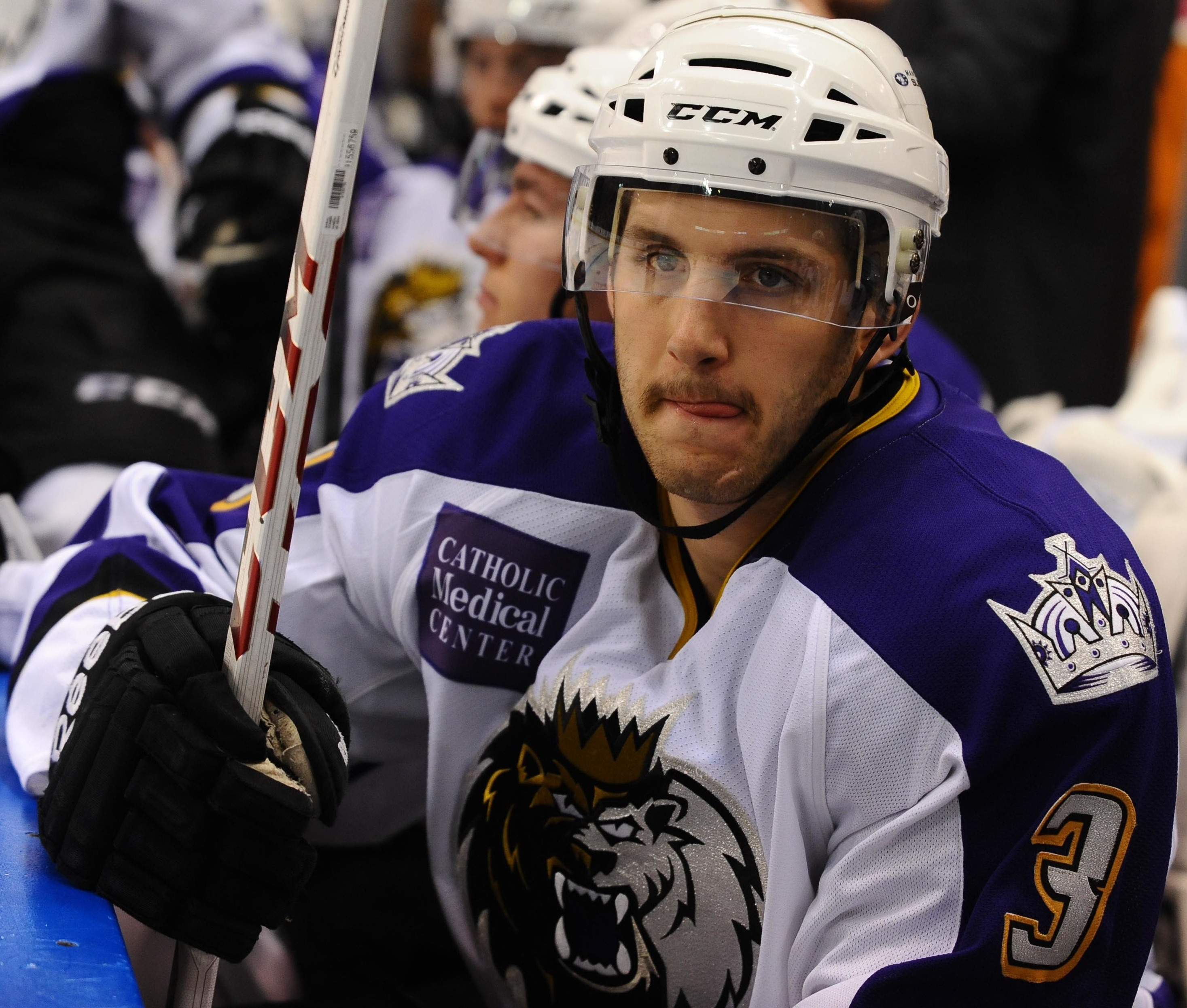
Forbort with the Manchester Monarchs in 2013

In the 2014–15 season, on February 11, 2015, the Kings recalled Forbort from the Manchester Monarchs of the American Hockey League (AHL). He was later returned to the Monarchs without playing a game for the Kings. He eventually made his NHL debut the following season on October 16, 2015, against the Minnesota Wild and recorded his first NHL goal in a 5–0 win over the Vancouver Canucks on December 28.

In the 2016–17 season, his second with the Kings, Forbort made the opening roster. He recorded 18 points in 82 games during the season.

On October 19, 2017, Forbort signed a two-year contract extension with the Kings.

In the 2019–20 season, Forbort began his eighth season within the Kings organization on the injured reserve. After returning from a conditioning assignment with the Ontario Reign, he featured in just 14 games for 1 assist.

==== Calgary Flames ====
On February 24, 2020, Forbort was dealt by the Kings at the NHL trade deadline to the Calgary Flames in exchange for a 2021 conditional fourth-round pick.

==== Winnipeg Jets ====
As a free agent, Forbort signed a one-year, $1 million contract with the Winnipeg Jets on October 11, 2020. In the pandemic delayed 2020–21 season, Forbort appeared in every game for the Jets on the blueline, contributing with 2 goals and 12 points in 56 regular season games.

==== Boston Bruins ====
On July 28, 2021, Forbort left at the conclusion of his contract with the Jets to sign a three-year, $9 million contract with the Boston Bruins as a free agent. He scored his first goal as a Bruin on October 24, 2021, against the San Jose Sharks.

During the 2022–23 season, Forbort, after scoring 5 goals for the first time in his career, suffered an injury in a game against the Winnipeg Jets on March 16, 2023, but returned for the playoffs.

In the 2023–24 season, Forbort battled many injuries. On December 7, 2023, Forbort was placed on LTIR. He returned on January 20, 2024, against the Montreal Canadiens. However, Forbort was injured in a March 2 contest against the New York Islanders, and a few days later, was once again placed on LTIR. The injury would require surgery, and Forbort was expected to miss the rest of the season. However, during the Bruins first round Stanley Cup playoffs matchup with the Toronto Maple Leafs, Forbort started practicing regularly with the team, progressing and recovering much quicker than was expected. Although he would not play during the series against the Leafs, the Bruins would defeat the Leafs in seven games, and Forbort would make his return in Game 1 of the following round, against the Florida Panthers.

==== Vancouver Canucks ====
Leaving the Bruins after three seasons, Forbort was signed as a free agent to a one-year, $1.5 million contract with the Vancouver Canucks on July 1, 2024.

==== Calgary Wranglers ====
As a free agent coming off an injury plagued final season with the Canucks, Forbort was un-signed over the summer before signing a professional tryout contract with the Calgary Wranglers in the AHL on October 1, 2026.

== International play ==
Forbort played for the US national team at the 2011 World Junior Ice Hockey Championships in Buffalo, New York, winning a bronze medal.

== Career statistics ==
=== Regular season and playoffs ===
			Regular season					Playoffs
Season	Team	League	GP	G	A	Pts	PIM	GP	G	A	Pts	PIM
2007–08	East High School	HS-MN		2	12	14		—	—	—	—	—
2008–09	East High School	HS-MN	22	4	14	18	28	3	2	4	6	4
2008–09	U.S. NTDP U17	USDP	9	1	5	6	10	—	—	—	—	—
2008–09	U.S. NTDP U18	NAHL	2	0	1	1	6	—	—	—	—	—
2009–10	U.S. NTDP Juniors	USHL	26	4	10	14	26	—	—	—	—	—
2009–10	U.S. NTDP U18	USDP	65	5	23	28	46	—	—	—	—	—
2010–11	University of North Dakota	WCHA	38	0	15	15	26	—	—	—	—	—
2011–12	University of North Dakota	WCHA	35	2	11	13	28	—	—	—	—	—
2012–13	University of North Dakota	WCHA	41	4	12	16	26	—	—	—	—	—
2012–13	Manchester Monarchs	AHL	6	0	1	1	0	4	0	0	0	4
2013–14	Manchester Monarchs	AHL	74	1	16	17	42	3	0	0	0	0
2014–15	Manchester Monarchs	AHL	67	4	11	15	52	19	0	6	6	12
2015–16	Los Angeles Kings	NHL	14	1	1	2	17	—	—	—	—	—
2015–16	Ontario Reign	AHL	40	2	8	10	40	13	0	2	2	0
2016–17	Los Angeles Kings	NHL	82	2	16	18	54	—	—	—	—	—
2017–18	Los Angeles Kings	NHL	78	1	17	18	49	—	—	—	—	—
2018–19	Los Angeles Kings	NHL	81	2	12	14	52	—	—	—	—	—
2019–20	Ontario Reign	AHL	5	1	0	1	5	—	—	—	—	—
2019–20	Los Angeles Kings	NHL	13	0	1	1	4	—	—	—	—	—
2019–20	Calgary Flames	NHL	7	0	0	0	0	10	1	1	2	2
2020–21	Winnipeg Jets	NHL	56	2	10	12	35	8	1	0	1	0
2021–22	Boston Bruins	NHL	76	4	10	14	48	7	1	0	1	12
2022–23	Boston Bruins	NHL	54	5	7	12	23	7	0	1	1	21
2022–23	Providence Bruins	AHL	2	0	0	0	2	—	—	—	—	—
2023–24	Boston Bruins	NHL	35	0	4	4	17	3	0	0	0	0
2024–25	Vancouver Canucks	NHL	54	2	9	11	45	—	—	—	—	—
2025–26	Vancouver Canucks	NHL	2	0	0	0	2	—	—	—	—	—
NHL totals			552	19	87	106	346	35	3	2	5	35

Medal record

Representing (United States) USA

Ice hockey

World Junior Championships
Bronze medal – third place	2011 USA	

IIHF World U18 Championships
Gold medal – first place	2010 Belarus	

=== International ===
Year	Team	Event	Result	GP	G	A	Pts	PIM
2010	United States	U18	1st place, gold medalist(s)	7	0	2	2	6
2011	United States	WJC	3rd place, bronze medalist(s)	6	0	0	0	0
2012	United States	WJC	7th	3	0	2	2	0
Junior totals				16	0	4	4	6

== Awards and honors ==
Award	Year
College
WCHA All-Tournament Team	2012
AHL
Calder Cup champion	2015

Awards and achievements
Preceded by Brayden Schenn	Los Angeles Kings first-round draft pick 2010	Succeeded by Tanner Pearson
