= 2019–20 Detroit Red Wings season =

Season of play of professional ice hockey team

2019–20 Detroit Red Wings
- Division: 8th Atlantic
- Conference: 16th Eastern
- 2019–20 record: 17–49–5
- Home record: 12–23–2
- Road record: 5–26–3
- Goals for: 145
- Goals against: 267

Team information
- General manager: Steve Yzerman
- Coach: Jeff Blashill
- Captain: Vacant
- Alternate captains: Justin Abdelkader; Luke Glendening; Dylan Larkin; Frans Nielsen
- Arena: Little Caesars Arena
- Average attendance: 18,716
- Minor league affiliates: Grand Rapids Griffins (AHL); Toledo Walleye (ECHL)

Team leaders
- Goals: Tyler Bertuzzi (21)
- Assists: Dylan Larkin (34)
- Points: Dylan Larkin (53)
- Penalty minutes: Filip Hronek (46)
- Plus/minus: Brian Lashoff (+1)
- Wins: Jonathan Bernier (15)
- Goals against average: Jonathan Bernier (2.95)

The 2019–20 Detroit Red Wings season was the 94th season for the National Hockey League (NHL) franchise that was established on September 25, 1926. It was the Red Wings' third season at Little Caesars Arena.

The Red Wings were eliminated from playoff contention on February 21, 2020 for the first time since the 1979–80 season and the 1982–83 season following a 4–1 loss to the New York Islanders, marking the Red Wings' fourth season in a row out of the playoffs and the first team to be eliminated before trade deadline since 2003–04 Pittsburgh Penguins. On March 10, the Red Wings clinched the worst overall record in the NHL for the first time since the 1985–86 season. The season was suspended by the league officials on March 12, 2020, after several other professional and collegiate sports organizations followed suit as a result of the ongoing COVID-19 pandemic. On May 26, the NHL regular season was officially declared over with the remaining games being cancelled, and the Red Wings already missed the playoffs for the fourth straight year. This was the first time since the 1985–86 season that the Red Wings finished with fewer than 20 wins. The Red Wings also became the first team since the 2004–05 NHL lockout, and the subsequent start of the salary cap era, to finish with a sub-.280 points percentage. Their .275 points percentage was the worst for an NHL team since the 1999–2000 Atlanta Thrashers.

== Off-season ==
On April 19, 2019, Steve Yzerman was named executive vice president and general manager of the Red Wings. Ken Holland was retained by the organization and promoted to the team's senior vice president. On May 7, 2019, Holland was named the general manager and president of hockey operations of the Edmonton Oilers.

== Standings ==
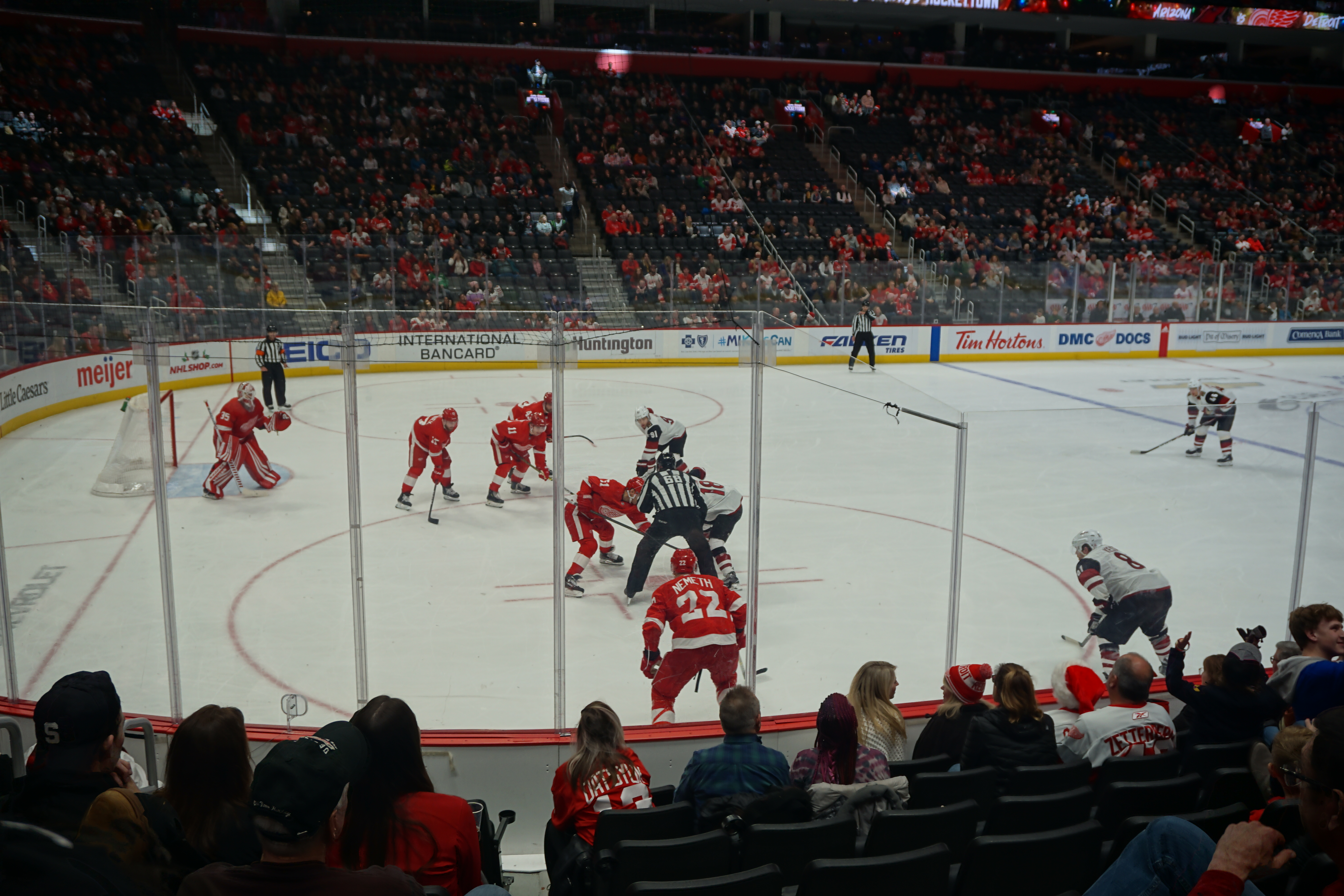
Detroit in action against Arizona on December 22, 2019

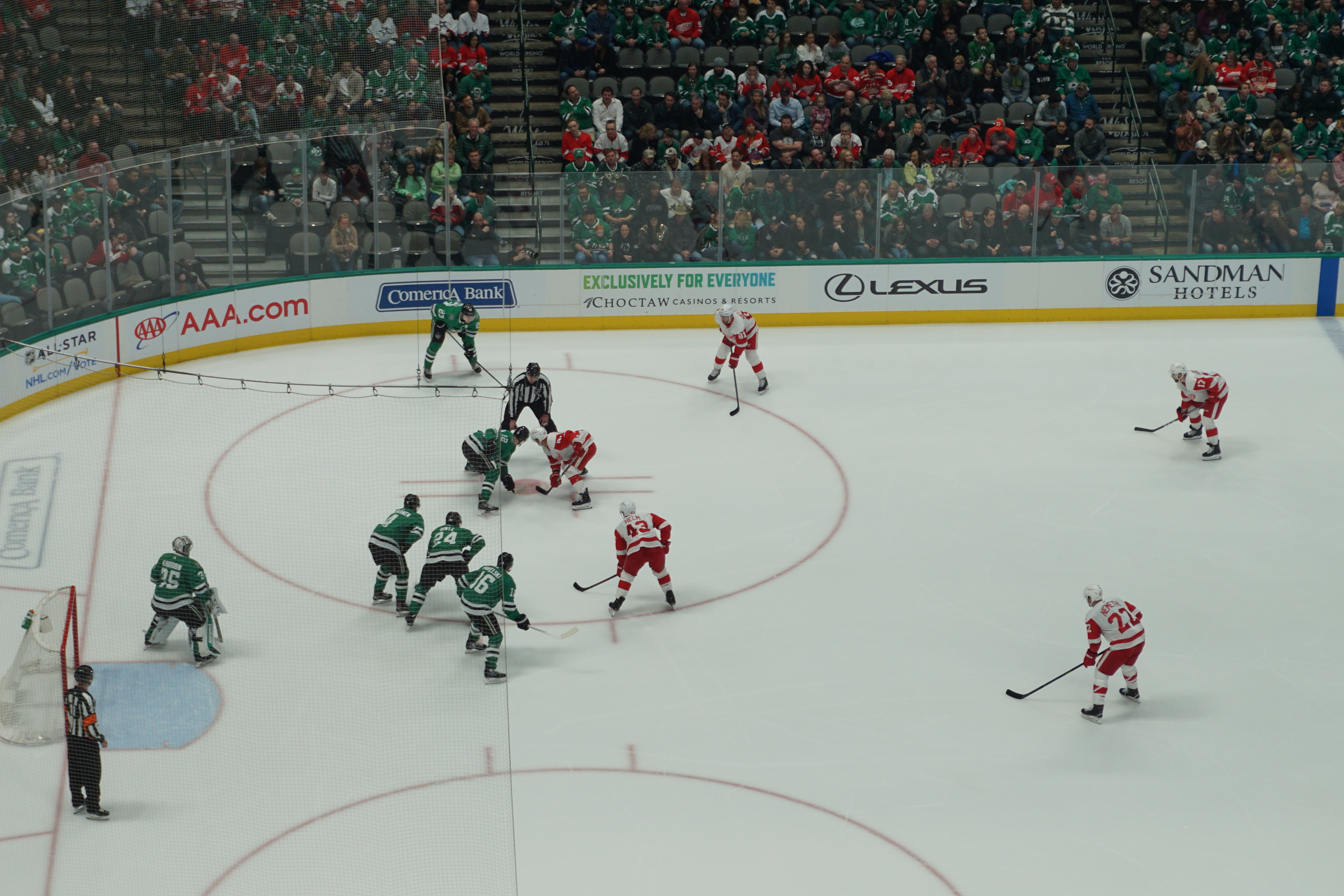
Detroit in action at Dallas on January 3, 2020

=== Divisional standings ===
Atlantic Division
Pos	Team	GP	W	L	OTL	RW	GF	GA	GD	Pts
1	p – Boston Bruins	70	44	14	12	38	227	174	+53	100
2	Tampa Bay Lightning	70	43	21	6	35	245	195	+50	92
3	Toronto Maple Leafs	70	36	25	9	28	238	227	+11	81
4	Florida Panthers	69	35	26	8	30	231	228	+3	78
5	Montreal Canadiens	71	31	31	9	19	212	221	−9	71
6	Buffalo Sabres	69	30	31	8	22	195	217	−22	68
7	Ottawa Senators	71	25	34	12	18	191	243	−52	62
8	Detroit Red Wings	71	17	49	5	13	145	267	−122	39

Source: National Hockey League
p – Clinched Presidents' Trophy

=== Eastern Conference ===
Pos	Team	GP	W	L	OTL	RW	GF	GA	GD	PCT	Qualification
1	Boston Bruins	70	44	14	12	38	227	174	+53	.714	Advance to Seeding round-robin tournament
2	Tampa Bay Lightning	70	43	21	6	35	245	195	+50	.657	Advance to Seeding round-robin tournament
3	Washington Capitals	69	41	20	8	31	240	215	+25	.652	Advance to Seeding round-robin tournament
4	Philadelphia Flyers	69	41	21	7	31	232	196	+36	.645	Advance to Seeding round-robin tournament
5	Pittsburgh Penguins	69	40	23	6	29	224	196	+28	.623	Advance to 2020 Stanley Cup playoffs qualifying round
6	Carolina Hurricanes	68	38	25	5	27	222	193	+29	.596	Advance to 2020 Stanley Cup playoffs qualifying round
7	New York Islanders	68	35	23	10	24	192	193	−1	.588	Advance to 2020 Stanley Cup playoffs qualifying round
8	Toronto Maple Leafs	70	36	25	9	28	238	227	+11	.579	Advance to 2020 Stanley Cup playoffs qualifying round
9	Columbus Blue Jackets	70	33	22	15	25	180	187	−7	.579	Advance to 2020 Stanley Cup playoffs qualifying round
10	Florida Panthers	69	35	26	8	30	231	228	+3	.565	Advance to 2020 Stanley Cup playoffs qualifying round
11	New York Rangers	70	37	28	5	31	234	222	+12	.564	Advance to 2020 Stanley Cup playoffs qualifying round
12	Montreal Canadiens	71	31	31	9	19	212	221	−9	.500	Advance to 2020 Stanley Cup playoffs qualifying round
13	Buffalo Sabres	69	30	31	8	22	195	217	−22	.493	
14	New Jersey Devils	69	28	29	12	22	189	230	−41	.493	
15	Ottawa Senators	71	25	34	12	18	191	243	−52	.437	
16	Detroit Red Wings	71	17	49	5	13	145	267	−122	.275	

Source: National Hockey League

== Schedule and results ==
=== Preseason ===
2019 preseason game log: 3–3–3 (Home: 3–0–2; Road: 0–3–1)
#	Date	Visitor	Score	Home	OT	Decision	Attendance	Record	Recap
1	September 17	Chicago	3–5	Detroit		Pickard	15,108	1–0–0
2	September 18	Detroit	1–2	Chicago		Larsson	20,523	1–1–0
3	September 20	NY Islanders	4–3	Detroit	OT	Howard	15,427	1–1–1
4	September 22	Pittsburgh	2–3	Detroit	OT	Bernier	16,093	2–1–1
5	September 23	Detroit	2–3	NY Islanders	OT	Howard	—	2–1–2
6	September 25	Detroit	2–4	Pittsburgh		Bernier	15,112	2–2–2
7	September 26^{1}	St. Louis	1–4	Detroit		Pickard	—	3–2–2
8	September 27	Toronto	4–3	Detroit	SO	Bernier	—	3–2–3
9	September 28	Detroit	0–5	Toronto		Howard	18,892	3–3–3
Game was played at Calumet Colosseum in Calumet, Michigan.

=== Regular season ===
2019–20 game log: 17–49–5 (Home: 12–23–2; Road: 5–26–3)

October: 4–8–1 (Home: 2–4–1; Road: 2–4–0)
#	Date	Visitor	Score	Home	OT	Decision	Attendance	Record	Pts	Recap
1	October 5	Detroit	5–3	Nashville		Howard	17,539	1–0–0	2
2	October 6	Dallas	3–4	Detroit		Bernier	19,515	2–0–0	4
3	October 8	Anaheim	3–1	Detroit		Howard	18,209	2–1–0	4
4	October 10	Detroit	4–2	Montreal		Bernier	21,302	3–1–0	6
5	October 12	Toronto	5–2	Detroit		Howard	19,515	3–2–0	6
6	October 15	Detroit	1–5	Vancouver		Bernier	18,183	3–3–0	6
7	October 17	Detroit	1–5	Calgary		Howard	18,232	3–4–0	6
8	October 18	Detroit	1–2	Edmonton		Bernier	17,420	3–5–0	6
9	October 22	Vancouver	5–2	Detroit		Howard	18,455	3–6–0	6
10	October 23	Detroit	2–5	Ottawa		Bernier	11,026	3–7–0	6
11	October 25	Buffalo	2–0	Detroit		Howard	18,616	3–8–0	6
12	October 27	St. Louis	5–4	Detroit	OT	Bernier	18,331	3–8–1	7
13	October 29	Edmonton	1–3	Detroit		Howard	19,515	4–8–1	9

November: 3–11–2 (Home: 2–5–0; Road: 1–6–2)
#	Date	Visitor	Score	Home	OT	Decision	Attendance	Record	Pts	Recap
14	November 1	Detroit	3–7	Carolina		Howard	15,383	4–9–1	9
15	November 2	Detroit	0–4	Florida		Bernier	14,411	4–10–1	9
16	November 4	Nashville	6–1	Detroit		Howard	18,526	4–11–1	9
17	November 6	Detroit	1–5	NY Rangers		Howard	16,804	4–12–1	9
18	November 8	Boston	2–4	Detroit		Bernier	19,515	5–12–1	11
19	November 10	Vegas	2–3	Detroit		Bernier	19,057	6–12–1	13
20	November 12	Detroit	4–3	Anaheim	OT	Bernier	15,046	7–12–1	15
21	November 14	Detroit	2–3	Los Angeles	OT	Bernier	16,871	7–12–2	16
22	November 16	Detroit	3–4	San Jose	SO	Howard	17,562	7–12–3	17
23	November 19	Ottawa	4–3	Detroit		Bernier	19,156	7–13–3	17
24	November 21	Detroit	4–5	Columbus		Howard	14,417	7–14–3	17
25	November 23	Detroit	1–5	New Jersey		Bernier	16,514	7–15–3	17
26	November 24	Carolina	2–0	Detroit		Howard	18,726	7–16–3	17
27	November 27	Toronto	6–0	Detroit		Howard	19,515	7–17–3	17
28	November 29	Detroit	1–6	Philadelphia		Pickard	18,566	7–18–3	17
29	November 30	Washington	5–2	Detroit		Bernier	19,190	7–19–3	17

December: 3–9–0 (Home: 2–5–0; Road: 1–4–0)
#	Date	Visitor	Score	Home	OT	Decision	Attendance	Record	Pts	Recap
30	December 2	NY Islanders	4–1	Detroit		Bernier	17,510	7–20–3	17
31	December 7	Pittsburgh	5–3	Detroit		Bernier	19,515	7–21–3	17
32	December 10	Detroit	1–5	Winnipeg		Comrie	15,325	7–22–3	17
33	December 12	Winnipeg	2–5	Detroit		Bernier	18,832	8–22–3	19
34	December 14	Detroit	2–1	Montreal		Bernier	21,302	9–22–3	21
35	December 15	Los Angeles	4–2	Detroit		Comrie	18,540	9–23–3	21
36	December 17	Columbus	5–3	Detroit		Bernier	17,639	9–24–3	21
37	December 21	Detroit	1–4	Toronto		Pickard	19,080	9–25–3	21
38	December 22	Arizona	5–2	Detroit		Howard	19,515	9–26–3	21
39	December 28	Detroit	4–5	Florida		Howard	17,731	9–27–3	21
40	December 29	Detroit	1–2	Tampa Bay		Bernier	19,092	9–28–3	21
41	December 31	San Jose	0–2	Detroit		Bernier	19,515	10–28–3	23

January: 2–8–1 (Home: 2–2–1; Road: 0–6–0)
#	Date	Visitor	Score	Home	OT	Decision	Attendance	Record	Pts	Recap
42	January 3	Detroit	1–4	Dallas		Bernier	18,532	10–29–3	23
43	January 5	Detroit	2–4	Chicago		Howard	21,493	10–30–3	23
44	January 7	Montreal	3–4	Detroit		Bernier	17,538	11–30–3	25
45	January 10	Ottawa	2–3	Detroit	SO	Bernier	18,724	12–30–3	27
46	January 12	Buffalo	5–1	Detroit		Howard	18,312	12–31–3	27
47	January 14	Detroit	2–8	NY Islanders		Howard	12,542	12–32–3	27
48	January 17	Pittsburgh	2–1	Detroit	OT	Howard	19,515	12–32–4	28
49	January 18	Florida	4–1	Detroit		Howard	19,231	12–33–4	28
50	January 20	Detroit	3–6	Colorado		Howard	18,110	12–34–4	28
51	January 22	Detroit	2–4	Minnesota		Howard	17,212	12–35–4	28
All-Star Break in St. Louis
52	January 31	Detroit	2–4	NY Rangers		Howard	17,169	12–36–4	28

February: 3–11–1 (Home: 2–5–0; Road: 1–6–1)
#	Date	Visitor	Score	Home	OT	Decision	Attendance	Record	Pts	Recap
53	February 1	NY Rangers	1–0	Detroit		Bernier	19,515	12–37–4	28
54	February 3	Philadelphia	3–0	Detroit		Bernier	17,526	12–38–4	28
55	February 6	Detroit	4–3	Buffalo	SO	Bernier	16,607	13–38–4	30
56	February 7	Detroit	0–2	Columbus		Howard	18,978	13–39–4	30
57	February 9	Boston	1–3	Detroit		Bernier	19,515	14–39–4	32
58	February 11	Detroit	2–3	Buffalo		Bernier	16,588	14–40–4	32
59	February 13	Detroit	1–4	New Jersey		Bernier	12,941	14–41–4	32
60	February 15	Detroit	1–4	Boston		Bernier	17,850	14–42–4	32
61	February 16	Detroit	1–5	Pittsburgh		Howard	18,654	14–43–4	32
62	February 18	Montreal	3–4	Detroit		Bernier	18,947	15–43–4	34
63	February 21	Detroit	1–4	NY Islanders		Bernier	13,917	15–44–4	34
64	February 23	Calgary	4–2	Detroit		Bernier	18,022	15–45–4	34
65	February 25	New Jersey	4–1	Detroit		Bernier	17,525	15–46–4	34
66	February 27	Minnesota	7–1	Detroit		Howard	17,663	15–47–4	34
67	February 29	Detroit	3–4	Ottawa	SO	Bernier	15,505	15–47–5	35

March: 2–2–0 (Home: 2–2–0; Road: 0–0–0)
#	Date	Visitor	Score	Home	OT	Decision	Attendance	Record	Pts	Recap
68	March 2	Colorado	2–1	Detroit		Bernier	17,708	15–48–5	35
69	March 6	Chicago	1–2	Detroit		Bernier	19,515	16–48–5	37
70	March 8	Tampa Bay	4–5	Detroit	SO	Bernier	18,841	17–48–5	39
71	March 10	Carolina	5–2	Detroit		Bernier	17,511	17–49–5	39

Cancelled games
#	Date	Visitor	Home
72	March 12	Detroit	Washington
73	March 14	Detroit	Tampa Bay
74	March 16	Florida	Detroit
75	March 20	Detroit	Arizona
76	March 21	Detroit	Vegas
77	March 24	Detroit	Boston
78	March 26	Philadelphia	Detroit
79	March 28	Washington	Detroit
80	March 31	Detroit	St. Louis
81	April 2	Detroit	Toronto
82	April 4	Tampa Bay	Detroit

Legend: Win (2 points) Loss (0 points) Overtime/shootout loss (1 point)

== Player statistics ==
=== Skaters ===
Regular season
Player	GP	G	A	Pts	+/−	PIM
Dylan Larkin	71	19	34	53	−21	39
Tyler Bertuzzi	71	21	27	48	−23	40
Anthony Mantha	43	16	22	38	−7	34
Robby Fabbri^{†}	52	14	17	31	−29	18
Filip Hronek	65	9	22	31	−38	46
Andreas Athanasiou‡	46	10	14	24	−45	26
Valtteri Filppula	70	6	15	21	−42	24
Madison Bowey	53	3	14	17	−16	34
Darren Helm	68	9	7	16	−6	37
Filip Zadina	28	8	7	15	−13	2
Mike Green‡	48	3	8	11	−32	32
Luke Glendening	60	6	3	9	−29	14
Frans Nielsen	60	4	5	9	−13	8
Patrik Nemeth	64	1	8	9	−10	28
Dennis Cholowski	36	2	6	8	−26	6
Taro Hirose	26	2	5	7	−12	6
Trevor Daley	43	0	7	7	−22	20
Adam Erne	56	2	3	5	−24	28
Christoffer Ehn	54	2	2	4	−21	2
Brendan Perlini^{†}	39	1	3	4	−18	10
Jacob de la Rose^{‡}	16	1	3	4	3	4
Danny DeKeyser	8	0	4	4	0	4
Givani Smith	21	2	1	3	−2	9
Justin Abdelkader	49	0	3	3	−14	25
Alex Biega	49	0	3	3	−9	24
Joe Hicketts	6	0	2	2	−5	2
Sam Gagner	6	1	0	1	−1	2
Brian Lashoff	9	0	1	1	1	6
Gustav Lindstrom	16	0	1	1	−6	14
Jonathan Ericsson	18	0	0	0	−12	4
Dylan McIlrath	16	0	0	0	−4	23
Evgeny Svechnikov	4	0	0	0	−1	2
Dmytro Timashov	5	0	0	0	0	0
Cody Goloubef	2	0	0	0	−1	0

=== Goaltenders ===
Regular season
Player	GP	GS	TOI	W	L	OT	GA	GAA	SA	SV%	SO	G	A	PIM
Jonathan Bernier	46	41	2,566	15	22	3	126	2.95	1,353	.907	1	0	3	4
Jimmy Howard	27	27	1,372	2	23	2	96	4.20	817	.882	0	0	0	0
Eric Comrie^{†}	3	2	127	0	2	0	9	4.28	66	.864	0	0	0	0
Calvin Pickard	3	1	165	0	2	0	15	5.46	74	.797	0	0	0	0

^{†}Denotes player spent time with another team before joining the Red Wings. Stats reflect time with the Red Wings only.
^{‡}Denotes player was traded mid-season. Stats reflect time with the Red Wings only.
Bold/italics denotes franchise record.

== Awards and honours ==
=== Awards ===
Regular season
Player	Award	Awarded
Anthony Mantha	NHL Second Star of the Week	October 7, 2019

=== Milestones ===
Regular season
Player	Milestone	Reached
Justin Abdelkader	700th career NHL game	October 23, 2019
Givani Smith	1st career NHL game	October 25, 2019
Valtteri Filppula	500th career NHL point	November 4, 2019
Givani Smith	1st career NHL point 1st career NHL assist	January 7, 2020
Givani Smith	1st career NHL goal	January 14, 2020
Frans Nielsen	300th career NHL assist	January 17, 2020
Dylan Larkin	100th career NHL goal	January 18, 2020
Valtteri Filppula	1,000th career NHL game	February 1, 2020
Gustav Lindstrom	1st career NHL game	February 6, 2020
Robby Fabbri	100th career NHL point	February 6, 2020
Mike Green	500th career NHL point	February 18, 2020
Gustav Lindstrom	1st career NHL point 1st career NHL assist	March 6, 2020
Luke Glendening	500th career NHL game	March 10, 2020

== Transactions ==
The Red Wings have been involved in the following transactions during the 2019–20 season.

=== Trades ===
Date	Details		Ref
October 7, 2019	To Vancouver Canucks David Pope	To Detroit Red Wings Alex Biega	
October 28, 2019	To Chicago Blackhawks Alec Regula	To Detroit Red Wings Brendan Perlini	
November 6, 2019	To St. Louis Blues Jacob de la Rose	To Detroit Red Wings Robby Fabbri	
November 30, 2019	To Arizona Coyotes Vili Saarijarvi	To Detroit Red Wings Eric Comrie	
December 12, 2019	To Carolina Hurricanes Oliwer Kaski	To Detroit Red Wings Kyle Wood	
February 24, 2020	To Edmonton Oilers Mike Green^{[a]}	To Detroit Red Wings Kyle Brodziak; Conditional draft pick in 2020 or 2021	
February 24, 2020	To Edmonton Oilers Andreas Athanasiou; Ryan Kuffner	To Detroit Red Wings Sam Gagner; 2020 2nd-round pick 2021 2nd-round pick	
September 26, 2020	To New York Rangers Future considerations	To Detroit Red Wings Marc Staal; 2021 2nd-round pick	

Notes:

- ^{a} Detroit to retain 50% ($2.6875 million) of salary as part of trade.

=== Free agents ===
Date	Player	Team	Contract term	Ref
July 1, 2019	Valtteri Filppula	from New York Islanders	2-year	
July 1, 2019	Patrik Nemeth	from Colorado Avalanche	2-year	
July 1, 2019	Calvin Pickard	from Arizona Coyotes	2-year	
July 1, 2019	Martin Frk	to Los Angeles Kings	1-year	
July 1, 2019	Luke Witkowski	to Tampa Bay Lightning	2-year	
July 1, 2019	Zachary Gallant	to San Jose Sharks	1-year	

=== Retirement ===
Date	Player	Ref
September 3, 2019	Niklas Kronwall	

=== Waivers ===
Date	Player	Team	Ref
February 21, 2020	Cody Goloubef	from Ottawa Senators	
February 24, 2020	Dmytro Timashov	from Toronto Maple Leafs	

== Draft picks ==
Below are the Detroit Red Wings' selections at the 2019 NHL entry draft, which was held on June 21 and 22, 2019, at Rogers Arena in Vancouver, British Columbia.

Round	#	Player	Pos	Nationality	College/Junior/Club team (League)
1	6	Moritz Seider	D	Germany	Adler Mannheim (DEL)
2	35	Antti Tuomisto	D	Finland	Ässät U20 (Nuorten SM-liiga)
2	54^{1}	Robert Mastrosimone	LW	United States	Chicago Steel (USHL)
2	60^{2}	Albert Johansson	D	Sweden	Färjestad BK J20 (J20 SuperElit)
3	66	Albin Grewe	RW	Sweden	Djurgårdens IF J20 (J20 SuperElit)
4	97	Ethan Phillips	C	Canada	Sioux City Musketeers (USHL)
5	128	Cooper Moore	D	United States	Brunswick (USHS)
6	159	Elmer Soderblom	RW	Sweden	Frölunda J20 (SuperElit)
6	177^{3}	Gustav Berglund	D	Sweden	Frölunda J18 (J18 Elit)
7	190	Kirill Tyutyayev	LW	Russia	JHC Avto (MHL)
7	191^{4}	Carter Gylander	G	Canada	Sherwood Park Crusaders (AJHL)

Notes:

1. The New York Islanders' second-round pick went to the Detroit Red Wings as the result of a trade on February 26, 2018, that sent Tomas Tatar to Vegas in exchange for a first-round pick in 2018, a third-round pick in 2021 and this pick.
2. The San Jose Sharks' second-round pick went to the Detroit Red Wings as the result of a trade on February 24, 2019, that sent Gustav Nyquist to San Jose in exchange for a conditional third-round pick in 2020 and this pick (being conditional at the time of the trade).
3. The Toronto Maple Leafs' sixth-round pick went to the Detroit Red Wings as the result of a trade on June 22, 2019, that sent Columbus' fifth-round pick in 2019 (143rd overall) to Buffalo in exchange for a seventh-round pick in 2019 (191st overall) and this pick.
4. The Buffalo Sabres' seventh-round pick went to the Detroit Red Wings as the result of a trade on June 22, 2019, that sent Columbus' fifth-round pick in 2019 (143rd overall) to Buffalo in exchange for Toronto's sixth-round pick in 2019 (177th overall) and this pick.
