= 2019–20 Tampa Bay Lightning season =

National Hockey League team season

2019–20 Tampa Bay Lightning
- Stanley Cup champions
- Eastern Conference champions
- Division: 2nd Atlantic
- Conference: 2nd Eastern
- 2019–20 record: 43–21–6
- Home record: 22–10–2
- Road record: 21–11–4
- Goals for: 245
- Goals against: 195

Team information
- General manager: Julien BriseBois
- Coach: Jon Cooper
- Captain: Steven Stamkos
- Alternate captains: Victor Hedman; Alex Killorn; Ryan McDonagh
- Arena: Amalie Arena
- Average attendance: 18,922
- Minor league affiliates: Syracuse Crunch (AHL); Orlando Solar Bears (ECHL)

Team leaders
- Goals: Nikita Kucherov (33)
- Assists: Nikita Kucherov (52)
- Points: Nikita Kucherov (85)
- Penalty minutes: Patrick Maroon (71)
- Plus/minus: Anthony Cirelli; Brayden Point (+28)
- Wins: Andrei Vasilevskiy (35)
- Goals against average: Andrei Vasilevskiy (2.56)

The 2019–20 Tampa Bay Lightning season was the 28th season for the National Hockey League (NHL) franchise that was established on December 16, 1991. The Lightning entered the season as the defending Atlantic Division and Presidents' Trophy champions.

The season was suspended by the league officials on March 12, 2020, after several other professional and collegiate sports organizations followed suit as a result of the COVID-19 pandemic. On May 26, the NHL regular season was officially declared over with the remaining games being cancelled. On July 10, following the extension of the NHL Collective Bargaining Agreement by the league and the Players' Association, it was announced that the Canadian cities of Toronto and Edmonton would be the locations the 2020 Stanley Cup playoffs would be staged in. The conclusion of the playoffs would be held in Edmonton as the site of both conference finals and the Stanley Cup Finals.

The playoffs began on August 1 in a modified format involving 24 teams. The Lightning began in Toronto with the other Eastern Conference teams and were given a bye into the first round by virtue of having the second-highest point percentage in the Eastern Conference at the time of the pause. For seeding, they competed in a four-team single round-robin along with the Boston Bruins, Washington Capitals, and Philadelphia Flyers, in which they finished in second place. The Lightning then defeated the Columbus Blue Jackets in the first round in five games, and the Boston Bruins in the second round, also in five games. Shifting to Edmonton, they competed in their fourth Eastern Conference Finals in the past six seasons, defeating the New York Islanders in six games.

On September 28, 2020, the Lightning won their second Stanley Cup in franchise history, and the first in 16 years since 2004 after defeating the Dallas Stars in six games. Victor Hedman won the Conn Smythe Trophy as playoff MVP.

On August 27, the playoffs were briefly suspended as the remaining teams decided not to play their next scheduled contests in the wake of the shooting of Jacob Blake.

== Off-season ==
=== April ===
The Lightning's off season began on April 16, 2019, when they were swept by the Columbus Blue Jackets in the first round of the 2019 Stanley Cup playoffs.

=== May ===
The Lightning's first move of the off season happened on May 3, 2019, when the team signed Jan Rutta to a 1-year contract extension. Rutta appeared in 14 regular season games and 4 playoffs games for the Lightning after coming over in a trade from the Chicago Blackhawks.

On May 23, 2019, the Lightning and forward prospect Jonne Tammela mutually agreed to part ways via contract termination. On May 28, 2019, Tammela signed with Lukko of the Liiga hockey league in Finland.

=== June ===
On June 14, 2019, the Lightning re-signed defenceman Cameron Gaunce to a 1-year contract extension. Last season Gaunce appeared in two regular season games with the Lightning.

On June 18, 2019, the Lightning re-signed defenceman Braydon Coburn to a two-year contract extension valued at $3.4 million. The contract will carry a $1.7 million cap hit. Coburn was coming off a three-year contract with the team. In 74 games last season Coburn produced 23 points, which set a personal best during his tenure with the club.

On June 19, 2019, the Lightning announced that they had re-signed defenceman Daniel Walcott to a 1-year contract extension. Walcott missed the majority of the previous season due to injury.

That same evening, the NHL conducted the 2019 NHL Awards in Las Vegas. Nikita Kucherov was awarded the Ted Lindsay Award and Hart Memorial Trophy. Kucherov was the second player in franchise history win the Ted Lindsay Award and Hart Memorial Trophy. Andrei Vasilevskiy was awarded the Vezina Trophy. Vasilevskiy was the first goaltender in franchise history to win the award. Additionally, the NHL announced the NHL All-Star teams and the NHL All-Rookie Team. Nikita Kucherov and Andrei Vasilevskiy were named to the NHL first All-Star team and Victor Hedman was named to the NHL second All-Star team. Anthony Cirelli was named to the All-Rookie Team.

On June 20, 2019, the Lightning announced that Ryan Callahan had been diagnosed with a degenerative disk disease of the lower spine. Doctors gave Callahan the recommendation that it was medically in his best interest to no longer play hockey. The team further announced that it would be placing Callahan on Long Term Injured Reserve for the upcoming season, which is the final year of his contract. Callahan stated in an interview after the announcement that his back had been an issue for him for the last few seasons and that this past season was the worst it had been. Callahan will finish his career with 757 games played, recording 186 goals and 386 points.

On June 22, 2019, the Lightning traded forward J. T. Miller to the Vancouver Canucks on the second day of the 2019 NHL entry draft. The Lightning received goaltender Marek Mazanec, a 3rd-round pick in 2019, and a conditional 1st-round pick in the 2020 NHL entry draft. The condition of the pick is that if the Canucks miss the playoffs in the coming season the pick becomes a 1st-round pick in 2021.

=== July ===
On July 5, 2019, the Lightning re-signed forward Carter Verhaeghe to a 1-year contract extension. Verhaeghe led the Syracuse Crunch and American Hockey League in scoring with 82 points (34 goals and 48 assists).

On the same day, the Lightning re-signed forward Cedric Paquette to a 2-year, contract extension. The cap hit on the contract is valued at $1.65 million. Paquette recorded 13 goals and 17 points last season for the Lightning.

On July 8, 2019, the Lightning signed forward Gemel Smith to a 1-year, 2-way contract. Last season Smith skated with the Dallas Stars and Boston Bruins, appearing in 17 NHL games in which he recorded 2 goals and 1 assist. In his professional career Smith has appearing in 80 NHL games, recording 11 goals and 20 points.

On July 9, 2019, the Lightning re-signed forward Danick Martel to a 1-year contract extension. Martel made the Lightning's roster last season, but primarily was healthy scratched. Martel skated in 9 games, recording 2 assists.

On July 16, 2019, the Lightning re-signed defenseman Ben Thomas to a 1-year contract extension. Thomas was drafted by the Lightning in the 2014 NHL entry draft, and has spent the previous seasons three seasons in the American Hockey League with the Syracuse Crunch.

On July 17, 2019, the Lightning re-signed defenseman Dominik Masin to a 1-year contract extension. Masin has spent the last three seasons playing for the Syracuse Crunch. Last season Masin skated in 69 games with the Crunch, recording 2 goals and 10 assists.

On July 29, 2019, the Lightning re-signed starting goaltender Andrei Vasilevskiy to a $76 million, 8-year contract extension. The annual cap hit is valued at $9.5 million. Vasilevskiy was coming off his first career Vezina Trophy win as the NHL's top goaltender. Vasilevskiy recorded a .925 save percentage, 2.40 goals-against average, and 6 shutouts during his Vezina campaign.

On July 30, 2019, the Lightning traded forward Ryan Callahan and the team's fifth-round 2020 draft pick to the Ottawa Senators in exchange for Mike Condon and Ottawa's 2020 sixth-round pick. The move freed up approximately $3.4 million in cap space.

=== August ===
On August 5, 2019, the Lightning signed free-agent defensemen Kevin Shattenkirk to a one-year, $1.75 million contract. Shattenkirk had played the previous two seasons for the New York Rangers before being bought out by the team. In the season prior to his buyout, Shattenkirk recorded 2 goals and 26 assists over 76 games.

On August 14, 2019, the Lightning traded forward Adam Erne to the Detroit Red Wings in exchange for a fourth-round pick in the 2020 NHL draft. Last season Erne skated in 65 games with the Lightning, recording 7 goals and 13 assists. Erne was originally acquired by the Lightning in the second-round of the 2013 NHL entry draft.

On August 24, 2019, the Lightning signed free-agent forward Patrick Maroon to a one-year, $900,000 contract. Maroon spent the previous season with the St. Louis Blues where he helped them capture their first Stanley Cup championship. Maroon scored 10 goals, and 28 points over 74 games in the regular season. In the playoffs Maroon recorded 3 goals and 7 points in 26 games.

== Training camp ==
=== September ===
On September 11, 2019, the Lightning announced their training camp roster for the coming season. The camp is to be divided among three rosters, which are named after Lightning radio and television broadcasters (Rick Peckham, Phil Esposito and Bobby ‘The Chief’ Taylor). Notably absent from the roster was Lightning forward Brayden Point, who was a restricted free agent.

On September 18, 2019, the Lightning made their first round of training camp roster cuts. The team trimmed their roster of six players to reduce the camp roster down to 56 players. Lightning prospects Gabriel Fortier, Maxim Cajkovic and Quinn Schmeimann were assigned to their junior teams. Eli Zummack, Louis Crevier and Cody Donaghey were released from their tryout agreements.

On September 20, 2019, the Lightning placed goaltenders Mike Condon and Louis Domingue on waivers for the purpose of assignment to the Syracuse for the upcoming season. Domingue served as the Lightning's backup last season and Condon was acquired in trade of forward Ryan Callahan. The team was rumored to have been trying to trade Domingue all summer, but no trade materialized. Both goaltenders cleared waivers the following day.

On September 21, 2019, the Lightning made their second round of training camp roster cuts to reduce their roster to 42-players. The forward group cut consisted of Peter Abbandonato, Jimmy Huntington, Boris Katchouk, Alexey Lipanov, Ryan Lohin, Kevin Lynch, Mikhail Shalagin, and Dennis Yan. On defense it was Luc Snuggerud, Oleg Sosunov, Matt Spencer, and Nolan Valleau. Clint Windsor was the sole goaltender cut among the group. This group of players will report to Syracuse for training camp. Additionally, Cory Conacher, Chris Mueller and Spencer Martin were placed on waivers with the purpose of assignment to Syracuse.

On September 22, 2019, the Lightning made their third round of training cam roster cuts. The team assigned forwards Alex Barre-Boulet, Ross Colton, Cory Conacher, Chris Mueller, Otto Somppi, and Mitchell Stephens to Syracuse. Defeseman Cal Foote and goaltender Spencer Martin were also assigned to Syracuse. Conacher, Mueller and Martin were assigned due to having cleared waivers. Forward Nolan Foote was assigned to his junior club (Kelowna Rockets). The team also placed Cameron Gaunce, Dominik Masin and Scott Wedgewood on waivers for assignment to Syracuse. All three players cleared waivers the following day.

On September 23, 2019, the Lightning announced that it had re-signed center Brayden Point to a three-year contract extension with a cap hit valued at $6.75 million annually. Point set career highs last season, recording 41 goals, 92 points and 51 assists. The team also announced that Point would not be medically cleared to play until late October due a procedure he had in the off-season.

On September 30, 2019, the Lightning made its final training camp roster cuts. The Lightning assigned forwards Danick Martel and Alexander Volkov to the Syracuse Crunch. Defenseman Luke Schenn was placed on waivers for the purpose of assignment to Syracuse. The forwards named to the opening night roster were Anthony Cirelli, Yanni Gourde, Tyler Johnson, Mathieu Joseph, Alex Killorn, Nikita Kucherov, Patrick Maroon, Ondrej Palat, Cedric Paquette, Brayden Point, Gemel Smith, Steven Stamkos, and Carter Verhaeghe. The defensemen named were Erik Cernak, Braydon Coburn, Victor Hedman, Ryan McDonagh, Jan Rutta, Mikhail Sergachev, Kevin Shattenkirk, and Luke Witkowski. Andrei Vasilevskiy and Curtis McElhinney were the starting and backup goaltenders named to the roster.

== Standings ==
=== Divisional standings ===
Atlantic Division
Pos	Team	GP	W	L	OTL	RW	GF	GA	GD	Pts
1	p – Boston Bruins	70	44	14	12	38	227	174	+53	100
2	Tampa Bay Lightning	70	43	21	6	35	245	195	+50	92
3	Toronto Maple Leafs	70	36	25	9	28	238	227	+11	81
4	Florida Panthers	69	35	26	8	30	231	228	+3	78
5	Montreal Canadiens	71	31	31	9	19	212	221	−9	71
6	Buffalo Sabres	69	30	31	8	22	195	217	−22	68
7	Ottawa Senators	71	25	34	12	18	191	243	−52	62
8	Detroit Red Wings	71	17	49	5	13	145	267	−122	39

Source: National Hockey League
p – Clinched Presidents' Trophy

=== Eastern Conference ===
Pos	Team	GP	W	L	OTL	RW	GF	GA	GD	PCT	Qualification
1	Boston Bruins	70	44	14	12	38	227	174	+53	.714	Advance to Seeding round-robin tournament
2	Tampa Bay Lightning	70	43	21	6	35	245	195	+50	.657	Advance to Seeding round-robin tournament
3	Washington Capitals	69	41	20	8	31	240	215	+25	.652	Advance to Seeding round-robin tournament
4	Philadelphia Flyers	69	41	21	7	31	232	196	+36	.645	Advance to Seeding round-robin tournament
5	Pittsburgh Penguins	69	40	23	6	29	224	196	+28	.623	Advance to 2020 Stanley Cup playoffs qualifying round
6	Carolina Hurricanes	68	38	25	5	27	222	193	+29	.596	Advance to 2020 Stanley Cup playoffs qualifying round
7	New York Islanders	68	35	23	10	24	192	193	−1	.588	Advance to 2020 Stanley Cup playoffs qualifying round
8	Toronto Maple Leafs	70	36	25	9	28	238	227	+11	.579	Advance to 2020 Stanley Cup playoffs qualifying round
9	Columbus Blue Jackets	70	33	22	15	25	180	187	−7	.579	Advance to 2020 Stanley Cup playoffs qualifying round
10	Florida Panthers	69	35	26	8	30	231	228	+3	.565	Advance to 2020 Stanley Cup playoffs qualifying round
11	New York Rangers	70	37	28	5	31	234	222	+12	.564	Advance to 2020 Stanley Cup playoffs qualifying round
12	Montreal Canadiens	71	31	31	9	19	212	221	−9	.500	Advance to 2020 Stanley Cup playoffs qualifying round
13	Buffalo Sabres	69	30	31	8	22	195	217	−22	.493	
14	New Jersey Devils	69	28	29	12	22	189	230	−41	.493	
15	Ottawa Senators	71	25	34	12	18	191	243	−52	.437	
16	Detroit Red Wings	71	17	49	5	13	145	267	−122	.275	

Source: National Hockey League

== Schedule and results ==
=== Preseason ===
2019 preseason game log: 2–3–2 (Home: 1–1–1; Road: 1–2–1)

Game	Date	Opponent	Score	OT	Decision	Location	Attendance	Record	Recap
1	September 17	Carolina Hurricanes	0–3		Wedgewood	Amalie Arena	12,010	0–1–0	
2	September 18	@ Carolina Hurricanes	0–2		Martin	PNC Arena		0–2–0	
3	September 20	Nashville Predators	3–1		McElhinney	Amalie Arena	13,456	1–2–0	
4	September 21	@ Nashville Predators	4–5	OT	Wedgewood	Bridgestone Arena		1–2–1	
5	September 24	@ Florida Panthers	3–6		Vasilevskiy	BB&T Center	8,744	1–3–1	
6	September 26	@ Florida Panthers	4–2		McElhinney	BB&T Center	8,611	2–3–1	
7	September 28	Florida Panthers	0–1	SO	Vasilevskiy	Amalie Arena	14,732	2–3–2	

Lightning score listed first;

Win Loss Overtime/shootout loss

=== Regular season ===
2019–20 regular season game log
October: 6–4–2, 14 points (Home: 2–1–1; Road: 4–3–1)

Game	Date	Opponent	Score	OT	Decision	Location	Attendance	Record	Points	Recap
1	October 3	Florida Panthers	5–2		Vasilevskiy	Amalie Arena	19,092	1–0–0	2	
2	October 5	@ Florida Panthers	3–4		Vasilevskiy	BB&T Center	17,424	1–1–0	2	
3	October 6	@ Carolina Hurricanes	3–4	OT	McElhinney	PNC Arena	14,125	1–1–1	3	
4	October 10	@ Toronto Maple Leafs	7–3		Vasilevskiy	Scotiabank Arena	19,387	2–1–1	5	
5	October 12	@ Ottawa Senators	2–4		McElhinney	Canadian Tire Centre	11,023	2–2–1	5	
6	October 15	@ Montreal Canadiens	3–1		Vasilevskiy	Bell Centre	20,406	3–2–1	7	
7	October 17	@ Boston Bruins	4–3	SO	Vasilevskiy	TD Garden	17,193	4–2–1	9	
8	October 19	Colorado Avalanche	2–6		Vasilevskiy	Amalie Arena	19,092	4–3–1	9	
9	October 23	Pittsburgh Penguins	3–2		Vasilevskiy	Amalie Arena	19,092	5–3–1	11	
10	October 26	Nashville Predators	2–3	OT	McElhinney	Amalie Arena	19,092	5–3–2	12	
11	October 29	@ New York Rangers	1–4		Vasilevskiy	Madison Square Garden	17,196	5–4–2	12	
12	October 30	@ New Jersey Devils	7–6	OT	McElhinney	Prudential Center	13,152	6–4–2	14	

November: 6–5–1, 13 points (Home: 4–3–0; Road: 2–2–1)

Game	Date	Opponent	Score	OT	Decision	Location	Attendance	Record	Points	Recap
13	November 1	@ New York Islanders	2–5		Vasilevskiy	Nassau Coliseum	12,043	6–5–2	14	
14	November 8	@ Buffalo Sabres	3–2		Vasilevskiy	Ericsson Globe†	13,230	7–5–2	16	
15	November 9	Buffalo Sabres	5–3		McElhinney	Ericsson Globe†	13,339	8–5–2	18	
16	November 14	New York Rangers	9–3		Vasilevskiy	Amalie Arena	19,092	9–5–2	20	
17	November 16	Winnipeg Jets	3–4		Vasilevskiy	Amalie Arena	19,092	9–6–2	20	
18	November 19	@ St. Louis Blues	1–3		Vasilevskiy	Enterprise Center	18,096	9–7–2	20	
19	November 21	@ Chicago Blackhawks	4–2		McElhinney	United Center	21,336	10–7–2	22	
20	November 23	Anaheim Ducks	6–2		Vasilevskiy	Amalie Arena	19,092	11–7–2	24	
21	November 25	Buffalo Sabres	5–2		Vasilevskiy	Amalie Arena	19,092	12–7–2	26	
22	November 27	St. Louis Blues	3–4		Vasilevskiy	Amalie Arena	19,092	12–8–2	26	
23	November 29	@ Washington Capitals	3–4	OT	Vasilevskiy	Capital One Arena	18,573	12–8–3	27	
24	November 30	Carolina Hurricanes	2–3		McElhinney	Amalie Arena	19,092	12–9–3	27	
† Games played in Stockholm, Sweden

December: 9–4–1, 19 points (Home: 6–3–1; Road: 3–1–0)

Game	Date	Opponent	Score	OT	Decision	Location	Attendance	Record	Points	Recap
25	December 3	@ Nashville Predators	3–2	OT	Vasilevskiy	Bridgestone Arena	17,163	13–9–3	29	
26	December 5	Minnesota Wild	4–5		Vasilevskiy	Amalie Arena	19,092	13–10–3	29	
27	December 7	San Jose Sharks	7–1		Vasilevskiy	Amalie Arena	19,092	14–10–3	31	
28	December 9	New York Islanders	1–5		McElhinney	Amalie Arena	19,092	14–11–3	31	
29	December 10	@ Florida Panthers	2–1		Vasilevskiy	BB&T Center	10,685	15–11–3	33	
30	December 12	Boston Bruins	3–2		Vasilevskiy	Amalie Arena	19,092	16–11–3	35	
31	December 14	Washington Capitals	2–5		Vasilevskiy	Amalie Arena	19,092	16–12–3	35	
32	December 17	Ottawa Senators	4–3	OT	Vasilevskiy	Amalie Arena	19,092	17–12–3	37	
33	December 19	Dallas Stars	3–4	OT	Vasilevskiy	Amalie Arena	19,092	17–12–4	38	
34	December 21	@ Washington Capitals	1–3		McElhinney	Capital One Arena	18,573	17–13–4	38	
35	December 23	Florida Panthers	6–1		Vasilevskiy	Amalie Arena	19,092	18–13–4	40	
36	December 28	Montreal Canadiens	5–4		Vasilevskiy	Amalie Arena	19,092	19–13–4	42	
37	December 29	Detroit Red Wings	2–1		McElhinney	Amalie Arena	19,092	20–13–4	44	
38	December 31	@ Buffalo Sabres	6–4		Vasilevskiy	KeyBank Center	18,465	21–13–4	46	

January: 10–2–1, 21 points (Home: 3–0–0; Road: 7–2–1)

Game	Date	Opponent	Score	OT	Decision	Location	Attendance	Record	Points	Recap
39	January 2	@ Montreal Canadiens	2–1		Vasilevskiy	Bell Centre	20,904	22–13–4	48	
40	January 4	@ Ottawa Senators	5–3		McElhinney	Canadian Tire Centre	13,914	23–13–4	50	
41	January 5	@ Carolina Hurricanes	3–1		Vasilevskiy	PNC Arena	18,015	24–13–4	52	
42	January 7	Vancouver Canucks	9–2		Vasilevskiy	Amalie Arena	19,092	25–13–4	54	
43	January 9	Arizona Coyotes	4–0		Vasilevskiy	Amalie Arena	19,092	26–13–4	56	
44	January 11	@ Philadelphia Flyers	1–0		Vasilevskiy	Wells Fargo Center	19,866	27–13–4	58	
45	January 12	@ New Jersey Devils	1–3		McElhinney	Prudential Center	14,203	27–14–4	58	
46	January 14	Los Angeles Kings	4–3	SO	Vasilevskiy	Amalie Arena	19,092	28–14–4	60	
47	January 16	@ Minnesota Wild	2–3		McElhinney	Xcel Energy Center	17,305	28–15–4	60	
48	January 17	@ Winnipeg Jets	7–1		Vasilevskiy	Bell MTS Place	15,325	29–15–4	62	
All-Star Break (January 23–26)
49	January 27	@ Dallas Stars	2–3	OT	Vasilevskiy	American Airlines Center	18,345	29–15–5	63	
50	January 29	@ Los Angeles Kings	4–2		Vasilevskiy	Staples Center	18,230	30–15–5	65	
51	January 31	@ Anaheim Ducks	4–3		Vasilevskiy	Honda Center	16,032	31–15–5	67	

February: 10–4–0, 20 points (Home: 6–2–0; Road: 4–2–0)

Game	Date	Opponent	Score	OT	Decision	Location	Attendance	Record	Points	Recap
52	February 1	@ San Jose Sharks	3–0		McElhinney	SAP Center	17,562	32–15–5	69	
53	February 4	Vegas Golden Knights	4–2		Vasilevskiy	Amalie Arena	19,092	33–15–5	71	
54	February 6	Pittsburgh Penguins	4–2		Vasilevskiy	Amalie Arena	19,092	34–15–5	73	
55	February 8	New York Islanders	3–1		Vasilevskiy	Amalie Arena	19,092	35–15–5	75	
56	February 10	@ Columbus Blue Jackets	2–1	OT	McElhinney	Nationwide Arena	17,131	36–15–5	77	
57	February 11	@ Pittsburgh Penguins	2–1	OT	Vasilevskiy	PPG Paints Arena	18,445	37–15–5	79	
58	February 13	Edmonton Oilers	3–1		Vasilevskiy	Amalie Arena	19,092	38–15–5	81	
59	February 15	Philadelphia Flyers	5–3		Vasilevskiy	Amalie Arena	19,092	39–15–5	83	
60	February 17	@ Colorado Avalanche	4–3	OT	McElhinney	Pepsi Center	18,107	40–15–5	85	
61	February 20	@ Vegas Golden Knights	3–5		Vasilevskiy	T-Mobile Arena	18,376	40–16–5	85	
62	February 22	@ Arizona Coyotes	3–7		Vasilevskiy	Gila River Arena	14,825	40–17–5	85	
63	February 25	Toronto Maple Leafs	3–4		Vasilevskiy	Amalie Arena	19,092	40–18–5	85	
64	February 27	Chicago Blackhawks	2–5		McElhinney	Amalie Arena	19,092	40–19–5	85	
65	February 29	Calgary Flames	4–3		Vasilevskiy	Amalie Arena	19,092	41–19–5	87	

March: 2–2–1, 5 points (Home: 1–1–0; Road: 1–1–1)

Game	Date	Opponent	Score	OT	Decision	Location	Attendance	Record	Points	Recap
66	March 3	Boston Bruins	1–2		Vasilevskiy	Amalie Arena	19,092	41–20–5	87	
67	March 5	Montreal Canadiens	4–0		Vasilevskiy	Amalie Arena	19,092	42–20–5	89	
68	March 7	@ Boston Bruins	5–3		Vasilevskiy	TD Garden	17,850	43–20–5	91	
69	March 8	@ Detroit Red Wings	4–5	OT	McElhinney	Little Caesars Arena	18,841	43–20–6	92	
70	March 10	@ Toronto Maple Leafs	1–2		Vasilevskiy	Scotiabank Arena	19,124	43–21–6	92	

Cancelled games

Game	Date	Opponent	Location
71	March 12	Philadelphia Flyers	Amalie Arena
72	March 14	Detroit Red Wings	Amalie Arena
73	March 15	New Jersey Devils	Amalie Arena
74	March 18	@ Vancouver Canucks	Rogers Arena
75	March 20	@ Edmonton Oilers	Rogers Place
76	March 21	@ Calgary Flames	Scotiabank Saddledome
77	March 25	Toronto Maple Leafs	Amalie Arena
78	March 27	Columbus Blue Jackets	Amalie Arena
79	March 28	New York Rangers	Amalie Arena
80	March 31	Ottawa Senators	Amalie Arena
81	April 2	@ Columbus Blue Jackets	Nationwide Arena
82	April 4	@ Detroit Red Wings	Little Caesars Arena

Lightning score listed first;

Win (2 points) Loss (0 points) Overtime/shootout loss (1 point)

=== Playoffs ===
Seeding Round-robin – Tampa Bay finishes 2nd

Game	Date	Opponent	Score	OT	Decision	Record	Points	Recap
1	August 3	Washington Capitals	3–2	SO	Vasilevskiy	1–0–0	2	
2	August 5	@ Boston Bruins	3–2		Vasilevskiy	2–0–0	4	
3	August 8	Philadelphia Flyers	1–4		Vasilevskiy	2–1–0	4	
† Games played at Scotiabank Arena in Toronto, Ontario, Canada

Lightning score listed first;

Win (2 points) Loss (0 points) Overtime/shootout loss (1 point)

2020 Stanley Cup playoffs
Eastern Conference First Round vs. Columbus Blue Jackets (7) - Tampa Bay wins series 4–1

Game	Date	Opponent	Score	OT	Decision	Series	Recap
1	August 11	Columbus Blue Jackets	3–2	5OT	Vasilevskiy	1–0	
2	August 13	Columbus Blue Jackets	1–3		Vasilevskiy	1–1	
3	August 15	@ Columbus Blue Jackets	3–2		Vasilevskiy	2–1	
4	August 17	@ Columbus Blue Jackets	2–1		Vasilevskiy	3–1	
5	August 19	Columbus Blue Jackets	5–4	OT	Vasilevskiy	4–1	
† Games played at Scotiabank Arena in Toronto, Ontario, Canada

Eastern Conference Second Round vs. Boston Bruins (4) - Tampa Bay wins series 4–1

Game	Date	Opponent	Score	OT	Decision	Series	Recap
1	August 23	Boston Bruins	2–3		Vasilevskiy	0–1	
2	August 25	Boston Bruins	4–3	OT	Vasilevskiy	1–1	
3	August 26	@ Boston Bruins	7–1		Vasilevskiy	2–1	
4	August 29	@ Boston Bruins	3–1		Vasilevskiy	3–1	
5	August 31	Boston Bruins	3–2	2OT	Vasilevskiy	4–1	
† Games played at Scotiabank Arena in Toronto, Ontario, Canada

Eastern Conference Finals vs. New York Islanders (6) - Tampa Bay wins series 4–2

Game	Date	Opponent	Score	OT	Decision	Series	Recap
1	September 7	New York Islanders	8–2		Vasilevskiy	1–0	
2	September 9	New York Islanders	2–1		Vasilevskiy	2–0	
3	September 11	@ New York Islanders	3–5		Vasilevskiy	2–1	
4	September 13	@ New York Islanders	4–1		Vasilevskiy	3–1	
5	September 15	New York Islanders	1–2	2OT	Vasilevskiy	3–2	
6	September 17	@ New York Islanders	2–1	OT	Vasilevskiy	4–2	
† Games played at Rogers Place in Edmonton, Alberta, Canada

Stanley Cup Finals vs. Dallas Stars (W3) - Tampa Bay wins series 4–2

Game	Date	Opponent	Score	OT	Decision	Series	Recap
1	September 19	Dallas Stars	1–4		Vasilevskiy	0–1	
2	September 21	Dallas Stars	3–2		Vasilevskiy	1–1	
3	September 23	@ Dallas Stars	5–2		Vasilevskiy	2–1	
4	September 25	@ Dallas Stars	5–4	OT	Vasilevskiy	3–1	
5	September 26	Dallas Stars	2–3	2OT	Vasilevskiy	3–2	
6	September 28	@ Dallas Stars	2–0		Vasilevskiy	4–2	
† Games played at Rogers Place in Edmonton, Alberta, Canada

Lightning score listed first;

Win Loss

== Player stats ==
Final

=== Skaters ===
Regular season
Player	GP	G	A	Pts	+/−	PIM
Nikita Kucherov	68	33	52	85	26	38
Steven Stamkos	57	29	37	66	14	22
Brayden Point	66	25	39	64	28	11
Victor Hedman	66	11	44	55	27	31
Alex Killorn	68	26	23	49	19	20
Anthony Cirelli	68	16	28	44	28	30
Ondrej Palat	69	17	24	41	25	22
Mikhail Sergachev	70	10	24	34	15	58
Kevin Shattenkirk	70	8	26	34	22	38
Tyler Johnson	65	14	17	31	9	16
Yanni Gourde	70	10	20	30	−5	49
Patrick Maroon	64	9	14	23	4	71
Cedric Paquette	60	7	11	18	−1	40
Carter Verhaeghe	52	9	4	13	−9	8
Erik Cernak	67	5	7	12	11	59
Ryan McDonagh	50	1	11	12	7	19
Mathieu Joseph	37	4	3	7	−2	16
Jan Rutta	33	1	6	7	6	14
Mitchell Stephens	38	3	3	6	−9	10
Braydon Coburn	40	1	3	4	5	16
Cameron Gaunce	3	1	3	4	2	4
Luke Schenn	25	1	2	3	−8	23
Luke Witkowski	12	1	2	3	−4	13
Zach Bogosian^{†}	8	0	2	2	0	12
Barclay Goodrow^{†}	8	0	2	2	0	17
Gemel Smith	3	1	0	1	0	4
Alexander Volkov	9	0	1	1	−6	6
Blake Coleman^{†}	9	0	1	1	2	16
Cory Conacher	4	0	1	1	−2	4

Playoffs
Player	GP	G	A	Pts	+/−	PIM
Nikita Kucherov	25	7	27	34	15	22
Brayden Point	23	14	19	33	12	10
Victor Hedman	25	10	12	22	13	24
Ondrej Palat	25	11	7	18	14	10
Yanni Gourde	25	7	7	14	12	19
Blake Coleman	25	5	8	13	6	31
Kevin Shattenkirk	25	3	10	13	8	6
Alex Killorn	24	5	5	10	−6	27
Mikhail Sergachev	25	3	7	10	4	26
Anthony Cirelli	25	3	6	9	−5	2
Tyler Johnson	25	4	3	7	−6	11
Patrick Maroon	25	1	5	6	2	32
Barclay Goodrow	25	1	5	6	5	16
Ryan McDonagh	22	1	4	5	−1	10
Erik Cernak	25	0	4	4	2	12
Zach Bogosian	20	0	4	4	1	12
Cedric Paquette	24	0	2	2	−4	16
Luke Schenn	11	0	2	2	3	7
Carter Verhaeghe	8	0	2	2	−1	2
Mitchell Stephens	7	1	0	1	−2	2
Steven Stamkos	1	1	0	1	1	0
Jan Rutta	5	0	1	1	0	12
Braydon Coburn	3	0	0	0	1	0
Alexander Volkov	1	0	0	0	0	0

=== Goaltenders ===
Regular season
Player	GP	GS	TOI	W	L	OT	GA	GAA	SA	SV%	SO	G	A	PIM
Andrei Vasilevskiy	52	52	3122	35	14	3	133	2.56	1605	.917	3	0	4	4
Curtis McElhinney	18	18	1081	8	7	3	48	2.89	551	.906	1	0	0	0

Playoffs
Player	GP	GS	TOI	W	L	OT^{α}	GA	GAA	SA	SV%	SO	G	A	PIM
Andrei Vasilevskiy	25	25	1709	18	7	0	54	1.90	740	.927	1	0	1	2

^{†}Denotes player spent time with another team before joining Tampa Bay. Stats reflect time with Tampa Bay only.
^{‡}Traded from Tampa Bay mid-season.
Bold/italics denotes franchise record

== Suspensions/fines ==
Player	Explanation	Length	Salary	Date issued
Cedric Paquette	Fined for high-sticking Frank Vatrano during the preseason game against the Florida Panthers on September 26, 2019, at the BB&T Center.	—	$2,500	September 27, 2019
Erik Cernak	Suspended for elbowing Rasmus Dahlin during the regular season game against the Buffalo Sabres on November 25, 2019, at Amalie Arena.	2 games	$7,500	November 26, 2019
Alex Killorn	Suspended for boarding Brock Nelson during the Eastern Conference final playoff game against the New York Islanders on September 9, 2020, at Rogers Place^{b}.	1 game	—	September 10, 2020

== Awards and honours ==
=== Awards ===
Regular season
Player	Award	Awarded
Victor Hedman	NHL First Star of the Week	December 30, 2019
Victor Hedman	NHL All-Star Game selection	December 30, 2019
Andrei Vasilevskiy	NHL First Star of the Week	January 13, 2020
Andrei Vasilevskiy	NHL All-Star Game selection	January 13, 2020
Steven Stamkos	NHL 2010s All-Decade Second Team	January 24, 2020
Andrei Vasilevskiy	NHL Third Star of January	February 1, 2020
Steven Stamkos	NHL Second Star of the Week	February 3, 2020
Andrei Vasilevskiy	NHL Third Star of the Week	February 10, 2020
Andrei Vasilevskiy	NHL Second Star of the Week	February 17, 2020
Victor Hedman	Second Team All Star	September 21, 2020
Nikita Kucherov	Second Team All Star	September 21, 2020

Hockey Hall of Fame
Individual	Award	Year awarded	Years with franchise	References
Rick Peckham	Foster Hewitt Memorial Award	2020	1995–2020	

=== Milestones ===
Regular season
Player	Milestone	Reached
Carter Verhaeghe	1st career NHL game	October 3, 2019
Carter Verhaeghe	1st career NHL assist 1st career NHL point	October 5, 2019
Victor Hedman	700th career NHL game	October 10, 2019
Brayden Point	200th career NHL point	October 10, 2019
Alexander Volkov	1st career NHL game	October 30, 2019
Yanni Gourde	200th career NHL game	November 14, 2020
Steven Stamkos	400th career NHL goal	November 16, 2019
Ondrej Palat	100th career NHL goal	November 23, 2019
Ondrej Palat	200th career NHL assist 300th career NHL point	November 25, 2019
Brayden Point	100th career NHL goal	November 29, 2019
Victor Hedman	100th career NHL goal	December 5, 2019
Carter Verhaeghe	1st career NHL goal	December 7, 2019
Mitchell Stephens	1st career NHL game	December 9, 2019
Mathieu Joseph	100th career NHL game	December 14, 2019
Nikita Kucherov	200th career NHL goal	December 22, 2019
Nikita Kucherov	300th career NHL assist 500th career NHL point	December 23, 2019
Tyler Johnson	500th career NHL game	December 28, 2019
Mitchell Stephens	1st career NHL goal 1st career NHL point	December 28, 2019
Steven Stamkos	800th career NHL point	December 28, 2019
Mikhail Sergachev	200th career NHL game	January 7, 2020
Mitchell Stephens	1st career NHL assist	January 7, 2020
Carter Verhaeghe	1st career NHL Hat-trick	January 7, 2020
Steven Stamkos	400th career NHL assist	January 9, 2020
Andrei Vasilevskiy	20th career NHL shutout	January 11, 2020
Erik Cernak	100th career NHL game	January 12, 2020
Alexander Volkov	1st career NHL assist 1st career NHL point	January 14, 2020
Anthony Cirelli	1st career NHL Hat-trick	January 17, 2020
Alex Killorn	300th career NHL point	January 17, 2020
Nikita Kucherov	500th career NHL game	February 6, 2020
Patrick Maroon	500th career NHL game	February 10, 2020
Mikhail Sergachev	100th career NHL point	February 10, 2020
Steven Stamkos	800th career NHL game	February 17, 2020
Kevin Shattenkirk	300th career NHL assist	March 5, 2020

Playoffs
Player	Milestone	Reached
Zach Bogosian	1st career playoff game	August 3, 2020
Mitchell Stephens	1st career playoff game 1st career playoff point 1st career playoff goal	August 3, 2020
Carter Verhaeghe	1st career playoff game 1st career playoff point 1st career playoff assist	August 15, 2020
Zach Bogosian	1st career playoff point 1st career playoff assist	August 15, 2020
Victor Hedman	100th career playoff game	September 11, 2020
Andrei Vasilevskiy	1st career playoff point 1st career playoff assist	September 13, 2020
Andrei Vasilevskiy	1st career playoff shutout	September 28, 2020

== Transactions ==
The Lightning have been involved in the following transactions during the 2019–20 season.

=== Trades ===
Date	Details		Ref
June 22, 2019	To Vancouver Canucks J. T. Miller	To Tampa Bay Lightning Marek Mazanec; 3rd-round pick in 2019; Conditional 1st-round pick in 2020	
July 30, 2019	To Ottawa Senators Ryan Callahan; 5th-round pick in 2020	To Tampa Bay Lightning Mike Condon; 6th-round pick in 2020	
August 14, 2019	To Detroit Red Wings Adam Erne	To Tampa Bay Lightning 4th-round pick in 2020	
November 2, 2019	To New Jersey Devils Louis Domingue	To Tampa Bay Lightning Conditional 7th-round pick in 2021	
November 24, 2019	To Buffalo Sabres Matt Spencer	To Tampa Bay Lightning Devante Stephens	
December 30, 2019	To Anaheim Ducks Chris Mueller	To Tampa Bay Lightning Patrick Sieloff	
February 16, 2020	To New Jersey Devils Nolan Foote; Conditional 1st-round pick in 2020	To Tampa Bay Lightning Blake Coleman	
February 20, 2020	To Florida Panthers Danick Martel	To Tampa Bay Lightning Anthony Greco	
February 24, 2020	To San Jose Sharks Anthony Greco; 1st-round pick in 2020	To Tampa Bay Lightning Barclay Goodrow; 3rd-round pick in 2020	

=== Free agents ===
Date	Player	Team	Contract term	Ref
July 1, 2019	Luke Schenn	from Vancouver Canucks	1-year	
July 1, 2019	Curtis McElhinney	from Carolina Hurricanes	2-year	
July 1, 2019	Luke Witkowski	from Detroit Red Wings	2-year	
July 1, 2019	Scott Wedgewood	from Buffalo Sabres	1-year	
July 1, 2019	Spencer Martin	from Colorado Avalanche	1-year	
July 1, 2019	Chris Mueller	from Toronto Maple Leafs	1-year	
July 1, 2019	Anton Stralman	to Florida Panthers	3-year	
July 1, 2019	Gabriel Dumont	to Minnesota Wild	2-year	
July 1, 2019	Andy Andreoff	to Philadelphia Flyers	2-year	
July 8, 2019	Gemel Smith	from Boston Bruins	1-year	
August 5, 2019	Kevin Shattenkirk	from New York Rangers	1-year	
August 24, 2019	Patrick Maroon	from St. Louis Blues	1-year	
February 23, 2020	Zach Bogosian	from Buffalo Sabres	1-year	
July 17, 2020	Sean Day	from Hartford Wolf Pack	1-year	

=== Waivers ===
Date	Player	Team	Ref

=== Contract terminations ===
Date	Player	Via	Ref

=== Retirement ===
Date	Player	Ref

=== Signings ===
Date	Player	Contract term	Ref
June 25, 2019	Nolan Foote	3-year	
July 5, 2019	Carter Verhaeghe	1-year	
July 5, 2019	Cedric Paquette	2-year	
July 9, 2019	Danick Martel	1-year	
July 16, 2019	Ben Thomas	1-year	
July 17, 2019	Dominik Masin	1-year	
July 29, 2019	Andrei Vasilevskiy	8-year	
September 23, 2019	Brayden Point	3-year	
April 17, 2020	Daniel Walcott	1-year	
September 9, 2020	Alex Green	2-year	

== Draft picks ==
Below are the Tampa Bay Lightning's selections at the 2019 NHL entry draft, which was held on June 21 and 22, 2019, at Rogers Arena in Vancouver, British Columbia.

Round	#	Player	Pos	Nationality	College/Junior/Club team (League)
1	27	Nolan Foote	LW	United States	Kelowna Rockets (WHL)
3	71^{1}	Hugo Alnefelt	G	Sweden	HV71 J20 (J20 SuperElit)
3	89	Maxim Cajkovic	RW	Slovakia	Saint John Sea Dogs (QMJHL)
4	120	Maxwell Crozier	D	Canada	Sioux Falls Stampede (USHL)
6	182	Quinn Schmiemann	D	Canada	Kamloops Blazers (WHL)
7	189^{2}	Mikhail Shalagin	LW	Russia	JHC Spartak (MHL)
7	213	McKade Webster	LW	United States	Green Bay Gamblers (USHL)

Notes:

1. The Vancouver Canucks' third-round pick went to the Tampa Bay Lightning as the result of a trade on June 22, 2019, that sent J. T. Miller to Vancouver in exchange for Marek Mazanec, a conditional first-round pick 2020 and this pick.
2. The Chicago Blackhawks' seventh-round pick went to the Tampa Bay Lightning as the result of a trade on January 11, 2019, that sent Slater Koekkoek and a fifth-round pick in 2019 to Chicago in exchange for Jan Rutta and this pick.

== Notes ==
^αIn the Round-Robin Seeding games the format followed that of the regular season. This meant there was a possibility of the game ending in overtime or a shootout. The regular playoff games followed the traditional format of sudden death overtime.
^bAs the result of COVID-19 the Eastern Conference final games were held in the playoff bubble at Rogers Place in Edmonton, Alberta.
