= 2019–20 San Jose Sharks season =

Professional ice hockey team season

2019–20 San Jose Sharks
- Division: 8th Pacific
- Conference: 15th Western
- 2019–20 record: 29–36–5
- Home record: 17–17–2
- Road record: 12–19–3
- Goals for: 182
- Goals against: 226

Team information
- General manager: Doug Wilson
- Coach: Peter DeBoer (Oct. 2 – Dec. 11); Bob Boughner (interim, Dec. 11 – Mar. 12)
- Captain: Logan Couture
- Alternate captains: Brent Burns; Tomas Hertl; Erik Karlsson; Joe Thornton
- Arena: SAP Center
- Average attendance: 16,427
- Minor league affiliate: San Jose Barracuda (AHL)

Team leaders
- Goals: Evander Kane (26)
- Assists: Erik Karlsson (34)
- Points: Timo Meier (49)
- Penalty minutes: Evander Kane (122)
- Plus/minus: Antti Suomela (+4)
- Wins: Martin Jones (17)
- Goals against average: Martin Jones (3.00)

The 2019–20 San Jose Sharks season was the 29th season for the National Hockey League (NHL) franchise that was established on May 9, 1990.

The season was suspended by the league officials on March 12, 2020, after several other professional and collegiate sports organizations followed suit as a result of the ongoing COVID-19 pandemic. On May 26, the NHL regular season was officially declared over with the remaining games being cancelled and the Sharks missed the playoffs for the first time since the 2014–15 season, and only the second time since 2002–03.

== Regular season ==
The Sharks lost their season opener 4–1 to the Vegas Golden Knights on October 2. Erik Karlsson missed the game due to the birth of his daughter. They fired Peter DeBoer and hired Bob Boughner on December 11, 2019.

== Standings ==
=== Divisional standings ===
Pacific Division
| Pos | Team | GP | W | L | OTL | RW | GF | GA | GD | Pts |
|---|---|---|---|---|---|---|---|---|---|---|
| 1 | Vegas Golden Knights | 71 | 39 | 24 | 8 | 30 | 227 | 211 | +16 | 86 |
| 2 | Edmonton Oilers | 71 | 37 | 25 | 9 | 31 | 225 | 217 | +8 | 83 |
| 3 | Calgary Flames | 70 | 36 | 27 | 7 | 25 | 210 | 215 | −5 | 79 |
| 4 | Vancouver Canucks | 69 | 36 | 27 | 6 | 27 | 228 | 217 | +11 | 78 |
| 5 | Arizona Coyotes | 70 | 33 | 29 | 8 | 26 | 195 | 187 | +8 | 74 |
| 6 | Anaheim Ducks | 71 | 29 | 33 | 9 | 20 | 187 | 226 | −39 | 67 |
| 7 | Los Angeles Kings | 70 | 29 | 35 | 6 | 21 | 178 | 212 | −34 | 64 |
| 8 | San Jose Sharks | 70 | 29 | 36 | 5 | 22 | 182 | 226 | −44 | 63 |

Source: National Hockey League

=== Western Conference ===
| Pos | Team | GP | W | L | OTL | RW | GF | GA | GD | PCT | Qualification |
|---|---|---|---|---|---|---|---|---|---|---|---|
| 1 | St. Louis Blues | 71 | 42 | 19 | 10 | 33 | 225 | 193 | +32 | .662 | Advance to Seeding round-robin tournament |
| 2 | Colorado Avalanche | 70 | 42 | 20 | 8 | 37 | 237 | 191 | +46 | .657 | Advance to Seeding round-robin tournament |
| 3 | Vegas Golden Knights | 71 | 39 | 24 | 8 | 30 | 227 | 211 | +16 | .606 | Advance to Seeding round-robin tournament |
| 4 | Dallas Stars | 69 | 37 | 24 | 8 | 26 | 180 | 177 | +3 | .594 | Advance to Seeding round-robin tournament |
| 5 | Edmonton Oilers | 71 | 37 | 25 | 9 | 31 | 225 | 217 | +8 | .585 | Advance to 2020 Stanley Cup playoffs qualifying round |
| 6 | Nashville Predators | 69 | 35 | 26 | 8 | 28 | 215 | 217 | −2 | .565 | Advance to 2020 Stanley Cup playoffs qualifying round |
| 7 | Vancouver Canucks | 69 | 36 | 27 | 6 | 27 | 228 | 217 | +11 | .565 | Advance to 2020 Stanley Cup playoffs qualifying round |
| 8 | Calgary Flames | 70 | 36 | 27 | 7 | 25 | 210 | 215 | −5 | .564 | Advance to 2020 Stanley Cup playoffs qualifying round |
| 9 | Winnipeg Jets | 71 | 37 | 28 | 6 | 30 | 216 | 203 | +13 | .563 | Advance to 2020 Stanley Cup playoffs qualifying round |
| 10 | Minnesota Wild | 69 | 35 | 27 | 7 | 30 | 220 | 220 | 0 | .558 | Advance to 2020 Stanley Cup playoffs qualifying round |
| 11 | Arizona Coyotes | 70 | 33 | 29 | 8 | 26 | 195 | 187 | +8 | .529 | Advance to 2020 Stanley Cup playoffs qualifying round |
| 12 | Chicago Blackhawks | 70 | 32 | 30 | 8 | 23 | 212 | 218 | −6 | .514 | Advance to 2020 Stanley Cup playoffs qualifying round |
| 13 | Anaheim Ducks | 71 | 29 | 33 | 9 | 20 | 187 | 226 | −39 | .472 | |
| 14 | Los Angeles Kings | 70 | 29 | 35 | 6 | 21 | 178 | 212 | −34 | .457 | |
| 15 | San Jose Sharks | 70 | 29 | 36 | 5 | 22 | 182 | 226 | −44 | .450 | |

Source: National Hockey League

Tiebreaking procedures

1. Fewer number of games played (only used during regular season).
2. Greater number of regulation wins (denoted by RW).
3. Greater number of wins in regulation and overtime (excluding shootout wins; denoted by ROW).
4. Greater number of total wins (including shootouts).
5. Greater number of points earned in head-to-head play; if teams played an uneven number of head-to-head games, the result of the first game on the home ice of the team with the extra home game is discarded.
6. Greater goal differential (difference between goals for and goals against).
7. Greater number of goals scored (denoted by GF).

== Schedule and results ==
=== Preseason ===
The preseason schedule was announced on June 17, 2019.

2019 preseason game log: 1–5–0 (Home: 1–2–0; Road: 0–3–0)
| # | Date | Visitor | Score | Home | OT | Decision | Attendance | Record | Recap |
|---|---|---|---|---|---|---|---|---|---|
| 1 | September 17 | Anaheim | 4–3 | San Jose | | Korenar | 12,981 | 0–1–0 |
| 2 | September 18 | San Jose | 4–6 | Calgary | | Bibeau | 17,348 | 0–2–0 |
| 3 | September 21 | Vegas | 3–1 | San Jose | | Jones | 15,052 | 0–3–0 |
| 4 | September 24 | San Jose | 1–4 | Anaheim | | Dell | 13,566 | 0–4–0 |
| 5 | September 26 | Calgary | 1–4 | San Jose | | Jones | 12,433 | 1–4–0 |
| 6 | September 29 | San Jose | 1–5 | Vegas | | Jones | 18,131 | 1–5–0 |

=== Regular season ===
The schedule was announced on June 25, 2019.

2019–20 game log 29–36–5 (Home: 17–17–2; Road: 12–19–3)

October: 4–8–1 (Home: 2–2–0; Road: 2–6–1)
| # | Date | Visitor | Score | Home | OT | Decision | Attendance | Record | Pts | Recap |
|---|---|---|---|---|---|---|---|---|---|---|
| 1 | October 2 | San Jose | 1–4 | Vegas | | Jones | 18,588 | 0–1–0 | 0 |
| 2 | October 4 | Vegas | 5–1 | San Jose | | Jones | 17,562 | 0–2–0 | 0 |
| 3 | October 5 | San Jose | 1–3 | Anaheim | | Dell | 15,795 | 0–3–0 | 0 |
| 4 | October 8 | San Jose | 2–5 | Nashville | | Jones | 17,251 | 0–4–0 | 0 |
| 5 | October 10 | San Jose | 5–4 | Chicago | | Dell | 21,455 | 1–4–0 | 2 |
| 6 | October 13 | Calgary | 1–3 | San Jose | | Jones | 16,250 | 2–4–0 | 4 |
| 7 | October 16 | Carolina | 2–5 | San Jose | | Jones | 15,143 | 3–4–0 | 6 |
| 8 | October 19 | Buffalo | 4–3 | San Jose | | Jones | 17,562 | 3–5–0 | 6 |
| 9 | October 22 | San Jose | 3–4 | Buffalo | OT | Jones | 15,876 | 3–5–1 | 7 |
| 10 | October 24 | San Jose | 4–2 | Montreal | | Dell | 21,052 | 4–5–1 | 9 |
| 11 | October 25 | San Jose | 1–4 | Toronto | | Jones | 19,102 | 4–6–1 | 9 |
| 12 | October 27 | San Jose | 2–5 | Ottawa | | Dell | 9,740 | 4–7–1 | 9 |
| 13 | October 29 | San Jose | 1–5 | Boston | | Jones | 17,193 | 4–8–1 | 9 |

November: 11–4–0 (Home: 7–4–0; Road: 4–0–0)
| # | Date | Visitor | Score | Home | OT | Decision | Attendance | Record | Pts | Recap |
|---|---|---|---|---|---|---|---|---|---|---|
| 14 | November 1 | Winnipeg | 3–2 | San Jose | | Jones | 15,117 | 4–9–1 | 9 |
| 15 | November 2 | Vancouver | 5–2 | San Jose | | Dell | 16,480 | 4–10–1 | 9 |
| 16 | November 5 | Chicago | 2–4 | San Jose | | Jones | 16,087 | 5–10–1 | 11 |
| 17 | November 7 | Minnesota | 5–6 | San Jose | | Jones | 15,764 | 6–10–1 | 13 |
| 18 | November 9 | Nashville | 1–2 | San Jose | SO | Jones | 17,562 | 7–10–1 | 15 |
| 19 | November 12 | Edmonton | 3–6 | San Jose | | Jones | 15,567 | 8–10–1 | 17 |
| 20 | November 14 | San Jose | 5–3 | Anaheim | | Jones | 16,007 | 9–10–1 | 19 |
| 21 | November 16 | Detroit | 3–4 | San Jose | SO | Jones | 17,562 | 10–10–1 | 21 |
| 22 | November 19 | Edmonton | 5–2 | San Jose | | Jones | 16,147 | 10–11–1 | 21 |
| 23 | November 21 | San Jose | 2–1 | Vegas | OT | Dell | 18,275 | 11–11–1 | 23 |
| 24 | November 23 | NY Islanders | 1–2 | San Jose | OT | Jones | 16,471 | 12–11–1 | 25 |
| 25 | November 25 | San Jose | 4–3 | Los Angeles | OT | Jones | 16,927 | 13–11–1 | 27 |
| 26 | November 27 | Winnipeg | 5–1 | San Jose | | Dell | 16,008 | 13–12–1 | 27 |
| 27 | November 29 | Los Angeles | 1–4 | San Jose | | Jones | 16,893 | 14–12–1 | 29 |
| 28 | November 30 | San Jose | 4–2 | Arizona | | Jones | 15,485 | 15–12–1 | 31 |

December: 2–9–2 (Home: 2–5–1; Road: 0–4–1)
| # | Date | Visitor | Score | Home | OT | Decision | Attendance | Record | Pts | Recap |
|---|---|---|---|---|---|---|---|---|---|---|
| 29 | December 3 | Washington | 5–2 | San Jose | | Jones | 15,762 | 15–13–1 | 31 |
| 30 | December 5 | San Jose | 2–3 | Carolina | SO | Dell | 14,275 | 15–13–2 | 32 |
| 31 | December 7 | San Jose | 1–7 | Tampa Bay | | Jones | 19,092 | 15–14–2 | 32 |
| 32 | December 8 | San Jose | 1–5 | Florida | | Jones | 11,340 | 15–15–2 | 32 |
| 33 | December 10 | San Jose | 1–3 | Nashville | | Jones | 17,160 | 15–16–2 | 32 |
| 34 | December 12 | NY Rangers | 6–3 | San Jose | | Jones | 16,381 | 15–17–2 | 32 |
| 35 | December 14 | Vancouver | 2–4 | San Jose | | Dell | 16,242 | 16–17–2 | 34 |
| 36 | December 17 | Arizona | 3–2 | San Jose | | Dell | 16,076 | 16–18–2 | 34 |
| 37 | December 21 | St. Louis | 5–2 | San Jose | | Jones | 16,065 | 16–19–2 | 34 |
| 38 | December 22 | Vegas | 3–1 | San Jose | | Dell | 17,015 | 16–20–2 | 34 |
| 39 | December 27 | Los Angeles | 3–2 | San Jose | OT | Dell | 16,610 | 16–20–3 | 35 |
| 40 | December 28 | Philadelphia | 1–6 | San Jose | | Jones | 16,819 | 17–20–3 | 37 |
| 41 | December 31 | San Jose | 0–2 | Detroit | | Jones | 19,515 | 17–21–3 | 37 |

January: 5–5–1 (Home: 3–1–0; Road: 2–4–1)
| # | Date | Visitor | Score | Home | OT | Decision | Attendance | Record | Pts | Recap |
|---|---|---|---|---|---|---|---|---|---|---|
| 42 | January 2 | San Jose | 3–2 | Pittsburgh | OT | Dell | 18,620 | 18–21–3 | 39 |
| 43 | January 4 | San Jose | 3–2 | Columbus | | Dell | 18,874 | 19–21–3 | 41 |
| 44 | January 5 | San Jose | 4–5 | Washington | OT | Jones | 18,573 | 19–21–4 | 42 |
| 45 | January 7 | San Jose | 2–3 | St. Louis | | Dell | 18,096 | 19–22–4 | 42 |
| 46 | January 9 | Columbus | 1–3 | San Jose | | Dell | 17,085 | 20–22–4 | 44 |
| 47 | January 11 | Dallas | 1–2 | San Jose | | Dell | 17,562 | 21–22–4 | 46 |
| 48 | January 14 | San Jose | 3–6 | Arizona | | Dell | 14,716 | 21–23–4 | 46 |
| 49 | January 16 | San Jose | 0–4 | Colorado | | Jones | 18,014 | 21–24–4 | 46 |
| 50 | January 18 | San Jose | 1–4 | Vancouver | | Dell | 18,786 | 21–25–4 | 46 |
| 51 | January 27 | Anaheim | 2–4 | San Jose | | Dell | 16,571 | 22–25–4 | 48 |
| 52 | January 29 | Vancouver | 5–2 | San Jose | | Jones | 16,024 | 22–26–4 | 48 |

February: 6–7–0 (Home: 2–3–0; Road: 4–4–0)
| # | Date | Visitor | Score | Home | OT | Decision | Attendance | Record | Pts | Recap |
|---|---|---|---|---|---|---|---|---|---|---|
| 53 | February 1 | Tampa Bay | 3–0 | San Jose | | Dell | 17,562 | 22–27–4 | 48 |
| 54 | February 4 | San Jose | 3–1 | Calgary | | Dell | 18,131 | 23–27–4 | 50 |
| 55 | February 6 | San Jose | 6–3 | Edmonton | | Dell | 17,175 | 24–27–4 | 52 |
| 56 | February 10 | Calgary | 6–2 | San Jose | | Dell | 17,101 | 24–28–4 | 52 |
| 57 | February 14 | San Jose | 3–2 | Winnipeg | | Dell | 15,325 | 25–28–4 | 54 |
| 58 | February 15 | San Jose | 2–0 | Minnesota | | Jones | 18,611 | 26–28–4 | 56 |
| 59 | February 17 | Florida | 5–3 | San Jose | | Dell | 16,510 | 26–29–4 | 56 |
| 60 | February 20 | San Jose | 1–2 | New Jersey | | Jones | 13,941 | 26–30–4 | 56 |
| 61 | February 22 | San Jose | 2–3 | NY Rangers | | Dell | 18,006 | 26–31–4 | 56 |
| 62 | February 23 | San Jose | 1–4 | NY Islanders | | Jones | 13,917 | 26–32–4 | 56 |
| 63 | February 25 | San Jose | 2–4 | Philadelphia | | Dell | 18,290 | 26–33–4 | 56 |
| 64 | February 27 | New Jersey | 2–3 | San Jose | OT | Jones | 16,913 | 27–33–4 | 58 |
| 65 | February 29 | Pittsburgh | 0–5 | San Jose | | Jones | 17,562 | 28–33–4 | 60 |

March: 1–3–1 (Home: 1–2–1; Road: 0–1–0)
| # | Date | Visitor | Score | Home | OT | Decision | Attendance | Record | Pts | Recap |
|---|---|---|---|---|---|---|---|---|---|---|
| 66 | March 3 | Toronto | 2–5 | San Jose | | Jones | 16,129 | 29–33–4 | 62 |
| 67 | March 5 | Minnesota | 3–2 | San Jose | | Jones | 14,517 | 29–34–4 | 62 |
| 68 | March 7 | Ottawa | 2–1 | San Jose | OT | Dell | 16,018 | 29–34–5 | 63 |
| 69 | March 8 | Colorado | 4–3 | San Jose | | Jones | 14,694 | 29–35–5 | 63 |
| 70 | March 11 | San Jose | 2–6 | Chicago | | Dell | 21,275 | 29–36–5 | 63 |

Cancelled games
| # | Date | Visitor | Home |
|---|---|---|---|
| 71 | March 13 | San Jose | St. Louis |
| 72 | March 14 | San Jose | Dallas |
| 73 | March 17 | San Jose | Colorado |
| 74 | March 19 | Montreal | San Jose |
| 75 | March 21 | Boston | San Jose |
| 76 | March 23 | San Jose | Calgary |
| 77 | March 25 | San Jose | Vancouver |
| 78 | March 27 | San Jose | Edmonton |
| 79 | March 29 | Arizona | San Jose |
| 80 | March 31 | San Jose | Los Angeles |
| 81 | April 2 | Dallas | San Jose |
| 82 | April 4 | Anaheim | San Jose |

Legend: Win (2 points) Loss (0 points) Overtime/shootout loss (1 point)

== Player statistics ==
=== Skaters ===
Regular season
| Player | GP | G | A | Pts | +/− | PIM |
|---|---|---|---|---|---|---|
| Timo Meier | 70 | 22 | 27 | 49 | −22 | 42 |
| Evander Kane | 64 | 26 | 21 | 47 | −12 | 122 |
| Brent Burns | 70 | 12 | 33 | 45 | −22 | 34 |
| Erik Karlsson | 56 | 6 | 34 | 40 | −15 | 16 |
| Logan Couture | 52 | 16 | 23 | 39 | 0 | 18 |
| Tomas Hertl | 48 | 16 | 20 | 36 | −18 | 16 |
| Kevin Labanc | 70 | 14 | 19 | 33 | −33 | 38 |
| Joe Thornton | 70 | 7 | 24 | 31 | −19 | 34 |
| Barclay Goodrow^{‡} | 62 | 8 | 16 | 24 | −8 | 80 |
| Patrick Marleau^{‡} | 58 | 10 | 10 | 20 | −5 | 12 |
| Marcus Sorensen | 66 | 7 | 11 | 18 | −12 | 26 |
| Marc-Edouard Vlasic | 70 | 5 | 10 | 15 | −10 | 10 |
| Brenden Dillon^{‡} | 59 | 1 | 13 | 14 | 0 | 83 |
| Melker Karlsson | 61 | 6 | 6 | 12 | −7 | 20 |
| Dylan Gambrell | 50 | 5 | 6 | 11 | −8 | 17 |
| Mario Ferraro | 61 | 2 | 9 | 11 | −15 | 30 |
| Radim Simek | 48 | 2 | 7 | 9 | −13 | 14 |
| Stefan Noesen^{†} | 34 | 6 | 2 | 8 | −1 | 32 |
| Joel Kellman | 31 | 3 | 4 | 7 | −1 | 4 |
| Antti Suomela | 20 | 1 | 6 | 7 | 4 | 4 |
| Noah Gregor | 28 | 3 | 2 | 5 | −5 | 8 |
| Tim Heed | 38 | 1 | 4 | 5 | −10 | 2 |
| Alexander True | 12 | 0 | 4 | 4 | 1 | 2 |
| Jacob Middleton | 10 | 0 | 2 | 2 | −2 | 9 |
| Maxim Letunov | 3 | 1 | 0 | 1 | 0 | 0 |
| Jonny Brodzinski | 3 | 0 | 1 | 1 | 0 | 0 |
| Lean Bergmann | 12 | 0 | 1 | 1 | −6 | 4 |
| Trevor Carrick | 3 | 0 | 0 | 0 | 0 | 5 |
| Dalton Prout | 2 | 0 | 0 | 0 | 0 | 7 |
| Brandon Davidson^{†} | 5 | 0 | 0 | 0 | −1 | 0 |
| Danil Yurtaikin | 4 | 0 | 0 | 0 | −1 | 0 |
| Nikolai Knyzhov | 3 | 0 | 0 | 0 | −1 | 2 |
| Joachim Blichfeld | 3 | 0 | 0 | 0 | −2 | 2 |
| Lukas Radil | 14 | 0 | 0 | 0 | −3 | 8 |

=== Goaltenders ===
Regular season
| Player | GP | GS | TOI | W | L | OT | GA | GAA | SA | SV% | SO | G | A | PIM |
|---|---|---|---|---|---|---|---|---|---|---|---|---|---|---|
| Martin Jones | 41 | 40 | 2,360 | 17 | 21 | 2 | 118 | 3.00 | 1,139 | .896 | 2 | 0 | 1 | 0 |
| Aaron Dell | 33 | 30 | 1,835 | 12 | 15 | 3 | 92 | 3.01 | 986 | .907 | 0 | 0 | 0 | 0 |

^{†}Denotes player spent time with another team before joining the Sharks. Stats reflect time with the Sharks only.
^{‡}Denotes player was traded mid-season. Stats reflect time with the Sharks only.
Bold/italics denotes franchise record.

== Transactions ==
The Sharks have been involved in the following transactions during the 2019–20 season.

=== Trades ===
| Date | Details | | Ref |
|---|---|---|---|
| June 22, 2019 | To Vegas Golden Knights PHI 2nd-round pick in 2019 | To San Jose Sharks 2nd-round pick in 2019; WPG 3rd-round pick in 2019 | |
| June 22, 2019 | To New Jersey Devils WPG 3rd-round pick in 2019; 3rd-round pick in 2019 | To San Jose Sharks NSH 2nd-round pick in 2019 | |
| June 22, 2019 | To Montreal Canadiens 4th-round pick in 2020 | To San Jose Sharks 4th-round pick in 2019 | |
| June 22, 2019 | To Vancouver Canucks Francis Perron; 7th-round pick in 2019 | To San Jose Sharks Tom Pyatt; 6th-round pick in 2019 | |
| June 22, 2019 | To Washington Capitals 5th-round pick in 2019 | To San Jose Sharks 7th-round pick in 2019; 7th-round pick in 2020 | |
| June 22, 2019 | To Pittsburgh Penguins WSH 7th-round pick in 2019 | To San Jose Sharks 7th-round pick in 2020 | |
| August 6, 2019 | To Carolina Hurricanes Kyle Wood | To San Jose Sharks Trevor Carrick | |
| September 27, 2019 | To Colorado Avalanche Antoine Bibeau | To San Jose Sharks Nicolas Meloche | |
| February 18, 2020 | To Washington Capitals Brenden Dillon | To San Jose Sharks 2nd-round pick in 2020 3rd-round pick in 2020 or 2021 | |
| February 24, 2020 | To Pittsburgh Penguins Patrick Marleau | To San Jose Sharks 3rd-round pick in 2021 | |
| February 24, 2020 | To Tampa Bay Lightning Barclay Goodrow 3rd-round pick in 2020 | To San Jose Sharks Anthony Greco 1st-round pick in 2020 | |
| February 24, 2020 | To Calgary Flames Future considerations | To San Jose Sharks Brandon Davidson | |
| October 5, 2020 | To Minnesota Wild 5th-round pick in 2022 | To San Jose Sharks Devan Dubnyk 7th-round pick in 2022 | |
| October 5, 2020 | To Minnesota Wild 3rd-round pick in 2021 | To San Jose Sharks Ryan Donato | |

=== Free agents ===
| Date | Player | Team | Contract term | Ref |
|---|---|---|---|---|
| July 1, 2019 | Joonas Donskoi | to Colorado Avalanche | 4-year | |
| July 1, 2019 | Gustav Nyquist | to Columbus Blue Jackets | 4-year | |
| July 1, 2019 | Joe Pavelski | to Dallas Stars | 3-year | |
| July 1, 2019 | Joakim Ryan | to Los Angeles Kings | 1-year | |
| July 2, 2019 | Dalton Prout | from Calgary Flames | 1-year | |
| July 2, 2019 | Nikolai Knyzhov | from SKA-Neva (VHL) | 3-year | |
| July 2, 2019 | Jonny Brodzinski | from Los Angeles Kings | 1-year | |
| July 2, 2019 | Zachary Gallant | from Toledo Walleye (ECHL) | 3-year | |
| July 26, 2019 | Tom Pyatt | to Skellefteå AIK (SHL) | 1-year | |
| August 21, 2019 | Jon Martin | to Tucson Roadrunners (AHL) | 1-year | |
| August 23, 2019 | Cody Donaghey | to Orlando Solar Bears (ECHL) | 1-year | |
| October 1, 2019 | Micheal Haley | to New York Rangers | 1-year | |
| October 8, 2019 | Patrick Marleau | from Carolina Hurricanes | 1-year | |
| October 10, 2019 | Michael Brodzinski | to Orlando Solar Bears (ECHL) | 1-year | |
| June 9, 2020 | Lukas Radil | to Spartak Moscow (KHL) | 1-year | |

=== Waivers ===
| Date | Player | Team | Ref |
|---|---|---|---|
| December 19, 2019 | Stefan Noesen | from Pittsburgh Penguins | |

=== Contract terminations ===
| Date | Player | Via | Ref |
|---|---|---|---|
| December 13, 2019 | Lukas Radil | Waived | |

=== Signings ===
| Date | Player | Contract term | Ref |
|---|---|---|---|
| July 1, 2019 | Timo Meier | 4-year | |
| July 1, 2019 | Tim Heed | 1-year | |
| July 2, 2019 | Artemi Kniazev | 3-year | |
| July 8, 2019 | Kevin Labanc | 1-year | |
| July 11, 2019 | Dylan Gambrell | 2-year | |
| July 11, 2019 | Antti Suomela | 1-year | |
| July 12, 2019 | Nick DeSimone | 2-year | |
| July 12, 2019 | Maxim Letunov | 1-year | |
| July 12, 2019 | Kyle Wood | 1-year | |
| September 6, 2019 | Joe Thornton | 1-year | |
| October 25, 2019 | Dillon Hamaliuk | 1-year | |
| March 9, 2020 | Radim Simek | 4-year | |
| May 4, 2020 | Fredrik Handemark | 1-year | |
| May 4, 2020 | Alexei Melnichuk | 2-year | |
| August 31, 2020 | Joel Kellman | 2-year | |

== Draft picks ==
Below are the San Jose Sharks' selections at the 2019 NHL entry draft, which was held on June 21 and 22, 2019, at the Rogers Arena in Vancouver, British Columbia, Canada.

| Round | # | Player | Pos | Nationality | College/Junior/Club team (League) |
|---|---|---|---|---|---|
| 2 | 48^{1} | Artemi Kniazev | D | Russia | Chicoutimi Saguenéens (QMJHL) |
| 2 | 55^{2} | Dillon Hamaliuk | LW | Canada | Seattle Thunderbirds (WHL) |
| 4 | 108^{3} | Yegor Spiridonov | C | Russia | Stalnye Lisy (MHL) |
| 6 | 164^{4} | Timur Ibragimov | LW | Russia | SKA-1946 (MHL) |
| 6 | 184 | Santeri Hatakka | D | Finland | Jokerit U20 (Nuorten SM-liiga) |

Notes:

1. The Vegas Golden Knights' second-round pick went to the San Jose Sharks as the result of a trade on June 22, 2019, that sent Philadelphia's second-round pick in 2019 (41st overall) to Vegas in exchange for Winnipeg's third-round pick in 2019 (82nd overall) and this pick.
2. The Nashville Predators' second-round pick went to the San Jose Sharks as the result of a trade on June 22, 2019, that sent Winnipeg's third-round pick in 2019 (82nd overall) and a third-round pick in 2019 (91st overall) to New Jersey in exchange for this pick.
3. The Montreal Canadiens' fourth-round pick went to the San Jose Sharks as the result of a trade on June 22, 2019, that sent a fourth-round pick in 2020 to Montreal in exchange for this pick.
4. The Vancouver Canucks' sixth-round pick went to the San Jose Sharks as the result of a trade on June 22, 2019, that sent Francis Perron and a seventh-round pick in 2019 (215th overall) to Vancouver in exchange for Tom Pyatt and this pick.

== Awards ==
Regular season
| Player | Award | Awarded |
|---|---|---|
| Tomas Hertl | All-Star | January 10, 2020 |
| Martin Jones | Third Star of the Week | December 2, 2019 |

Hertl replaced Logan Couture, who was unable to participate in the All-Star Game due to an injury.
