= 2019–20 New York Islanders season =

National Hockey League season

2019–20 New York Islanders
- Division: 5th Metropolitan
- Conference: 7th Eastern
- 2019–20 record: 35–23–10
- Home record: 20–9–6
- Road record: 15–14–4
- Goals for: 192
- Goals against: 193

Team information
- General manager: Lou Lamoriello
- Coach: Barry Trotz
- Captain: Anders Lee
- Alternate captains: Josh Bailey; Cal Clutterbuck; Andrew Ladd (Oct. 4 – Nov. 15)
- Arena: Barclays Center; Nassau Veterans Memorial Coliseum
- Average attendance: 12,810
- Minor league affiliates: Bridgeport Sound Tigers (AHL); Worcester Railers (ECHL)

Team leaders
- Goals: Brock Nelson (26)
- Assists: Mathew Barzal (41)
- Points: Mathew Barzal (60)
- Penalty minutes: Ross Johnston (78)
- Plus/minus: Casey Cizikas (+12)
- Wins: Semyon Varlamov (19)
- Goals against average: Semyon Varlamov (2.62)

The 2019–20 New York Islanders season was the 48th season in the franchise's history. It was their fifth season in the Barclays Center in the New York City borough of Brooklyn, which they moved into after leaving Nassau Veterans Memorial Coliseum in Nassau County on Long Island at the conclusion of the 2014–15 season. During the regular season, the Islanders were scheduled to play 21 home games at Nassau Coliseum but on September 23 moved seven more games from the Barclays Center, making it a total of 28 games to be played at Nassau Veterans Memorial Coliseum. On February 29, 2020, it was announced that the Islanders would play their last game at Barclays Center on March 22, and then would move to Nassau Veterans Memorial Coliseum permanently.

The season was suspended by the league officials on March 12, 2020, after several other professional and collegiate sports organizations followed suit as a result of the ongoing COVID-19 pandemic. On May 26, the NHL regular season was officially declared over with the remaining games being cancelled. Instead of Nassau Coliseum, the Islanders started the playoffs at Scotiabank Arena in Toronto. The Islanders advanced from the qualifying round where they defeated the Florida Panthers in four games. They would then defeat the Washington Capitals in five games in the first round. They faced off against the Philadelphia Flyers in the second round, defeating them in seven games and advanced to the conference finals for the first time since 1993, and shifted the postseason to Rogers Place in Edmonton. However, the Islanders went on to lose to the Tampa Bay Lightning in six games, ending their playoff run. The Islanders set a franchise record for most games played (22) in the postseason.

== Standings ==
=== Divisional standings ===
Metropolitan Division
Pos	Team	GP	W	L	OTL	RW	GF	GA	GD	Pts
1	Washington Capitals	69	41	20	8	31	240	215	+25	90
2	Philadelphia Flyers	69	41	21	7	31	232	196	+36	89
3	Pittsburgh Penguins	69	40	23	6	29	224	196	+28	86
4	Carolina Hurricanes	68	38	25	5	27	222	193	+29	81
5	Columbus Blue Jackets	70	33	22	15	25	180	187	−7	81
6	New York Islanders	68	35	23	10	24	192	193	−1	80
7	New York Rangers	70	37	28	5	31	234	222	+12	79
8	New Jersey Devils	69	28	29	12	22	189	230	−41	68

Source: National Hockey League

=== Conference standings ===
Pos	Team	GP	W	L	OTL	RW	GF	GA	GD	PCT	Qualification
1	Boston Bruins	70	44	14	12	38	227	174	+53	.714	Advance to Seeding round-robin tournament
2	Tampa Bay Lightning	70	43	21	6	35	245	195	+50	.657	Advance to Seeding round-robin tournament
3	Washington Capitals	69	41	20	8	31	240	215	+25	.652	Advance to Seeding round-robin tournament
4	Philadelphia Flyers	69	41	21	7	31	232	196	+36	.645	Advance to Seeding round-robin tournament
5	Pittsburgh Penguins	69	40	23	6	29	224	196	+28	.623	Advance to 2020 Stanley Cup playoffs qualifying round
6	Carolina Hurricanes	68	38	25	5	27	222	193	+29	.596	Advance to 2020 Stanley Cup playoffs qualifying round
7	New York Islanders	68	35	23	10	24	192	193	−1	.588	Advance to 2020 Stanley Cup playoffs qualifying round
8	Toronto Maple Leafs	70	36	25	9	28	238	227	+11	.579	Advance to 2020 Stanley Cup playoffs qualifying round
9	Columbus Blue Jackets	70	33	22	15	25	180	187	−7	.579	Advance to 2020 Stanley Cup playoffs qualifying round
10	Florida Panthers	69	35	26	8	30	231	228	+3	.565	Advance to 2020 Stanley Cup playoffs qualifying round
11	New York Rangers	70	37	28	5	31	234	222	+12	.564	Advance to 2020 Stanley Cup playoffs qualifying round
12	Montreal Canadiens	71	31	31	9	19	212	221	−9	.500	Advance to 2020 Stanley Cup playoffs qualifying round
13	Buffalo Sabres	69	30	31	8	22	195	217	−22	.493	
14	New Jersey Devils	69	28	29	12	22	189	230	−41	.493	
15	Ottawa Senators	71	25	34	12	18	191	243	−52	.437	
16	Detroit Red Wings	71	17	49	5	13	145	267	−122	.275	

Source: National Hockey League

== Schedule and results ==
=== Preseason ===
The preseason schedule was published on June 18, 2019.

2019 preseason game log: 5–2–0 (Home: 2–0–0; Road: 3–2–0)
#	Date	Visitor	Score	Home	OT	Decision	Attendance	Record	Recap
1	September 16	NY Islanders	3–1	Philadelphia		Varlamov	16,570	1–0–0
2	September 17	Philadelphia	2–3	NY Islanders	OT	Coreau	—	2–0–0
3	September 20	NY Islanders	4–3	Detroit	OT	Gibson	15,427	3–0–0
4	September 21	NY Islanders	3–4	New Jersey		Coreau	10,652	3–1–0
5^{[a]}	September 23	Detroit	2–3	NY Islanders	OT	Varlamov	—	4–1–0
6	September 24	NY Islanders	1–3	NY Rangers		Greiss	16,450	4–2–0
7^{[b]}	September 28	NY Rangers	2–4	NY Islanders		Greiss	—	5–2–0
Notes:^{a} Game was played at Nassau Veterans Memorial Coliseum in Uniondale, New York.^{b} Game was played at Webster Bank Arena in Bridgeport, Connecticut.

=== Regular season ===
The regular season schedule was released on June 25, 2019. On September 23, the Islanders revised their schedule and moved seven games from Barclays Center to Nassau Veterans Memorial Coliseum.

2019–20 game log

October: 8–3–0 (Home: 5–2–0; Road: 3–1–0)
#	Date	Visitor	Score	Home	OT	Decision	Attendance	Record	Pts	Recap
1^{[b]}	October 4	Washington	2–1	NY Islanders		Varlamov	13,917	0–1–0	0
2^{[b]}	October 6	Winnipeg	1–4	NY Islanders		Greiss	9,923	1–1–0	2
3^{[b]}	October 8	Edmonton	5–2	NY Islanders		Varlamov	10,985	1–2–0	2
4	October 11	NY Islanders	2–5	Carolina		Greiss	14,875	1–3–0	2
5^{[b]}	October 12	Florida	2–3	NY Islanders	SO	Varlamov	11,421	2–3–0	4
6^{[b]}	October 14	St. Louis	2–3	NY Islanders	OT	Greiss	10,355	3–3–0	6
7	October 17	NY Islanders	3–1	Winnipeg		Varlamov	15,063	4–3–0	8
8	October 19	NY Islanders	3–2	Columbus	OT	Greiss	15,276	5–3–0	10
9^{[b]}	October 24	Arizona	2–4	NY Islanders		Varlamov	10,752	6–3–0	12
10	October 25	NY Islanders	4–2	Ottawa		Greiss	11,189	7–3–0	14
11^{[b]}	October 27	Philadelphia	3–5	NY Islanders		Varlamov	12,055	8–3–0	16

November: 9–2–2 (Home: 6–0–1; Road: 3–2–1)
#	Date	Visitor	Score	Home	OT	Decision	Attendance	Record	Pts	Recap
12^{[b]}	November 1	Tampa Bay	2–5	NY Islanders		Greiss	12,043	9–3–0	18
13	November 2	NY Islanders	1–0	Buffalo		Varlamov	19,070	10–3–0	20
14^{[a]}	November 5	Ottawa	1–4	NY Islanders		Greiss	11,212	11–3–0	22
15^{[a]}	November 7	Pittsburgh	4–3	NY Islanders	OT	Varlamov	12,613	11–3–1	23
16^{[a]}	November 9	Florida	1–2	NY Islanders		Greiss	13,100	12–3–1	25
17^{[b]}	November 13	Toronto	4–5	NY Islanders		Varlamov	13,293	13–3–1	27
18	November 16	NY Islanders	4–3	Philadelphia	SO	Greiss	19,023	14–3–1	29
19	November 19	NY Islanders	5–4	Pittsburgh	OT	Varlamov	18,411	15–3–1	31
20^{[a]}	November 21	Pittsburgh	3–4	NY Islanders	OT	Greiss	13,212	16–3–1	33
21	November 23	NY Islanders	1–2	San Jose	OT	Varlamov	16,471	16–3–2	34
22	November 25	NY Islanders	0–3	Anaheim		Greiss	16,269	16–4–2	34
23	November 27	NY Islanders	1–4	Los Angeles		Varlamov	16,082	16–5–2	34
24^{[a]}	November 30	Columbus	0–2	NY Islanders		Greiss	13,433	17–5–2	36

December: 8–5–1 (Home: 2–2–1; Road: 6–3–0)
#	Date	Visitor	Score	Home	OT	Decision	Attendance	Record	Pts	Recap
25	December 2	NY Islanders	4–1	Detroit		Varlamov	17,510	18–5–2	38
26	December 3	NY Islanders	2–4	Montreal		Greiss	20,440	18–6–2	38
27^{[b]}	December 5	Vegas	2–3	NY Islanders	OT	Varlamov	13,117	19–6–2	40
28	December 7	NY Islanders	1–3	Dallas		Greiss	18,532	19–7–2	40
29	December 9	NY Islanders	5–1	Tampa Bay		Varlamov	19,092	20–7–2	42
30	December 12	NY Islanders	3–1	Florida		Greiss	12,609	21–7–2	44
31^{[b]}	December 14	Buffalo	2–3	NY Islanders	OT	Varlamov	13,795	22–7–2	46
32^{[b]}	December 17	Nashville	8–3	NY Islanders		Greiss	12,114	22–8–2	46
33	December 19	NY Islanders	3–2	Boston	SO	Varlamov	17,850	23–8–2	48
34^{[b]}	December 21	Anaheim	6–5	NY Islanders	SO	Varlamov	13,917	23–8–3	49
35^{[b]}	December 23	Columbus	3–2	NY Islanders		Greiss	13,917	23–9–3	49
36	December 27	NY Islanders	2–5	Chicago		Greiss	21,747	23–10–3	49
37	December 29	NY Islanders	3–1	Minnesota		Varlamov	17,506	24–10–3	51
38	December 31	NY Islanders	4–3	Washington		Varlamov	18,573	25–10–3	53

January: 4–5–2 (Home: 2–3–1; Road: 2–2–1)
#	Date	Visitor	Score	Home	OT	Decision	Attendance	Record	Pts	Recap
39^{[b]}	January 2	New Jersey	2–1	NY Islanders		Varlamov	13,917	25–11–3	53
40	January 4	NY Islanders	0–3	Toronto		Varlamov	19,536	25–12–3	53
41^{[b]}	January 6	Colorado	0–1	NY Islanders		Varlamov	13,241	26–12–3	55
42	January 7	NY Islanders	4–3	New Jersey	OT	Greiss	14,518	27–12–3	57
43^{[a]}	January 11	Boston	3–2	NY Islanders	OT	Varlamov	14,962	27–12–4	58
44	January 13	NY Islanders	2–6	NY Rangers		Varlamov	17,403	27–13–4	58
45^{[b]}	January 14	Detroit	2–8	NY Islanders		Greiss	12,542	28–13–4	60
46^{[b]}	January 16	NY Rangers	3–2	NY Islanders		Varlamov	13,917	28–14–4	60
47^{[b]}	January 18	Washington	6–4	NY Islanders		Varlamov	13,917	28–15–4	60
48	January 19	NY Islanders	1–2	Carolina	SO	Greiss	18,680	28–15–5	61
49	January 21	NY Islanders	4–2	NY Rangers		Greiss	17,276	29–15–5	63

February: 6–6–3 (Home: 5–1–2; Road: 1–5–1)
#	Date	Visitor	Score	Home	OT	Decision	Attendance	Record	Pts	Recap
50^{[a]}	February 1	Vancouver	4–3	NY Islanders	OT	Greiss	14,862	29–15–6	64
51^{[a]}	February 4	Dallas	3–4	NY Islanders	OT	Varlamov	10,128	30–15–6	66
52^{[a]}	February 6	Los Angeles	3–5	NY Islanders		Greiss	11,108	31–15–6	68
53	February 8	NY Islanders	1–3	Tampa Bay		Varlamov	19,092	31–16–6	68
54	February 10	NY Islanders	5–3	Washington		Greiss	18,573	32–16–6	70
55^{[a]}	February 11	Philadelphia	3–5	NY Islanders		Varlamov	12,228	33–16–6	72
56	February 13	NY Islanders	0–5	Nashville		Greiss	17,561	33–17–6	72
57	February 15	NY Islanders	0–1	Vegas		Varlamov	18,444	33–18–6	72
58	February 17	NY Islanders	1–2	Arizona		Varlamov	13,956	33–19–6	72
59	February 19	NY Islanders	1–3	Colorado		Varlamov	18,011	33–20–6	72
60^{[b]}	February 21	Detroit	1–4	NY Islanders		Varlamov	13,917	34–20–6	74
61^{[b]}	February 23	San Jose	1–4	NY Islanders		Varlamov	13,917	35–20–6	76
62^{[b]}	February 25	NY Rangers	4–3	NY Islanders	OT	Varlamov	13,917	35–20–7	77
63	February 27	NY Islanders	2–3	St. Louis	OT	Greiss	18,096	35–20–8	78
64^{[b]}	February 29	Boston	4–0	NY Islanders		Varlamov	13,917	35–21–8	78

March: 0–2–2 (Home: 0–1–1; Road: 0–1–1)
#	Date	Visitor	Score	Home	OT	Decision	Attendance	Record	Pts	Recap
65^{[a]}	March 3	Montreal	6–2	NY Islanders		Greiss	12,788	35–22–8	78
66	March 5	NY Islanders	3–4	Ottawa		Varlamov	13,445	35–23–8	78
67^{[b]}	March 7	Carolina	3–2	NY Islanders	OT	Greiss	13,917	35–23–9	79
68	March 10	NY Islanders	4–5	Vancouver	SO	Varlamov	18,871	35–23–10	80

Cancelled games
#	Date	Visitor	Home
69	March 12	NY Islanders	Calgary
70	March 13	NY Islanders	Edmonton
71	March 15	NY Islanders	Pittsburgh
72^{[a]}	March 17	Calgary	NY Islanders
73	March 19	NY Islanders	Toronto
74	March 21	NY Islanders	New Jersey
75^{[a]}	March 22	Carolina	NY Islanders
76	March 24	NY Islanders	Philadelphia
77^{[b]}	March 26	Buffalo	NY Islanders
78	March 28	NY Islanders	Montreal
79	March 30	NY Islanders	Columbus
80^{[b]}	March 31	Minnesota	NY Islanders
81^{[b]}	April 2	Chicago	NY Islanders
82^{[b]}	April 4	New Jersey	NY Islanders

Legend: Win (2 points) Loss (0 points) Overtime/shootout loss (1 point)
Notes:
^{a} Game was scheduled to be played at Barclays Center in Brooklyn, New York.
^{b} Game was scheduled to be played at Nassau Veterans Memorial Coliseum in Uniondale, New York.

=== Playoffs ===
The Islanders faced the Florida Panthers in the qualifying round, defeating them in four games.

The Islanders faced the Washington Capitals in the first round, defeating them in five games.

The Islanders faced the Philadelphia Flyers in the second round, defeating them in seven games, and advanced to the conference finals for the first time since 1993.

The Islanders faced the Tampa Bay Lightning in the conference finals, where they lost in six games.

2020 Stanley Cup playoffs

Eastern Conference qualifying round vs. (10) Florida Panthers: New York won 3–1
#	Date	Visitor	Score	Home	OT	Decision	Series	Recap
1	August 1	Florida	1–2	NY Islanders		Varlamov	1–0
2	August 4	Florida	2–4	NY Islanders		Varlamov	2–0
3	August 5	NY Islanders	2–3	Florida		Varlamov	2–1
4	August 7	NY Islanders	5–1	Florida		Varlamov	3–1

Eastern Conference first round vs. (3) Washington Capitals: New York won 4–1
#	Date	Visitor	Score	Home	OT	Decision	Series	Recap
1	August 12	NY Islanders	4–2	Washington		Varlamov	1–0
2	August 14	NY Islanders	5–2	Washington		Varlamov	2–0
3	August 16	Washington	1–2	NY Islanders	OT	Varlamov	3–0
4	August 18	Washington	3–2	NY Islanders		Varlamov	3–1
5	August 20	NY Islanders	4–0	Washington		Varlamov	4–1

Eastern Conference second round vs. (1) Philadelphia Flyers: New York won 4–3
#	Date	Visitor	Score	Home	OT	Decision	Series	Recap
1	August 24	NY Islanders	4–0	Philadelphia		Varlamov	1–0
2	August 26	NY Islanders	3–4	Philadelphia	OT	Greiss	1–1
3	August 29	Philadelphia	1–3	NY Islanders		Varlamov	2–1
4	August 30	Philadelphia	2–3	NY Islanders		Greiss	3–1
5	September 1	NY Islanders	3–4	Philadelphia	OT	Varlamov	3–2
6	September 3	Philadelphia	5–4	NY Islanders	2OT	Varlamov	3–3
7	September 5	NY Islanders	4–0	Philadelphia		Greiss	4–3

Eastern Conference finals vs. (2) Tampa Bay Lightning: Tampa Bay won 4–2
#	Date	Visitor	Score	Home	OT	Decision	Series	Recap
1	September 7	NY Islanders	2–8	Tampa Bay		Greiss	0–1
2	September 9	NY Islanders	1–2	Tampa Bay		Varlamov	0–2
3	September 11	Tampa Bay	3–5	NY Islanders		Varlamov	1–2
4	September 13	Tampa Bay	4–1	NY Islanders		Varlamov	1–3
5	September 15	NY Islanders	2–1	Tampa Bay	2OT	Varlamov	2–3
6	September 17	Tampa Bay	2–1	NY Islanders	OT	Varlamov	2–4

Legend: Win Loss

== Player statistics ==
As of September 17, 2020

=== Skaters ===
Regular season
Player	GP	G	A	Pts	+/−	PIM
Mathew Barzal	68	19	41	60	+5	44
Brock Nelson	68	26	28	54	+6	32
Anders Lee	68	20	23	43	+8	47
Josh Bailey	68	14	29	43	–12	10
Jordan Eberle	58	16	24	40	+1	12
Anthony Beauvillier	68	18	21	39	–11	15
Ryan Pulock	68	10	25	35	+8	14
Derick Brassard	66	10	22	32	–2	16
Devon Toews	68	6	22	28	+1	16
Nick Leddy	60	3	18	21	–1	14
Casey Cizikas	48	10	4	14	+12	41
Leo Komarov	48	4	10	14	+2	10
Scott Mayfield	67	5	8	13	+8	53
Johnny Boychuk	64	2	9	11	–11	14
Michael Dal Colle	53	4	6	10	–8	12
Adam Pelech	38	1	8	9	+4	20
Matt Martin	55	5	3	8	–1	40
Cal Clutterbuck	37	3	4	7	+6	22
Noah Dobson	34	1	6	7	–1	8
Tom Kühnhackl	3	0	1	1	+2	0
Ross Johnston	32	3	1	4	+1	78
Kieffer Bellows	8	2	1	3	+3	2
Andy Greene^{†}	10	0	3	3	0	2
Jean-Gabriel Pageau^{†}	7	2	0	2	–6	17
Cole Bardreau	10	1	1	2	–2	6
Andrew Ladd	4	1	0	1	+2	4
Oliver Wahlstrom	9	0	0	0	–2	4
Otto Koivula	12	0	0	0	0	2

Playoffs
Player	GP	G	A	Pts	+/−	PIM
Josh Bailey	22	2	18	20	+8	0
Brock Nelson	22	9	9	18	+4	12
Mathew Barzal	22	5	12	17	+2	10
Anthony Beauvillier	22	9	5	14	+6	10
Jordan Eberle	22	5	9	14	+2	10
Jean-Gabriel Pageau	22	8	3	11	+10	21
Anders Lee	22	7	4	11	+4	15
Ryan Pulock	22	2	8	10	–1	6
Devon Toews	22	2	8	10	+3	6
Derick Brassard	18	2	6	8	+1	6
Nick Leddy	22	3	4	7	+7	0
Matt Martin	22	5	1	6	0	28
Adam Pelech	21	1	4	5	+6	8
Scott Mayfield	22	1	4	5	+12	12
Cal Clutterbuck	21	2	2	4	+5	18
Andy Greene	21	2	2	4	+2	12
Leo Komarov	17	1	2	3	+1	4
Casey Cizikas	18	0	2	2	0	8
Tom Kühnhackl	3	0	1	1	+2	0
Johnny Boychuk	3	0	0	0	+1	0
Ross Johnston	5	0	0	0	+1	12
Andrew Ladd	1	0	0	0	–1	0
Michael Dal Colle	3	0	0	0	0	0
Noah Dobson	1	0	0	0	0	0

=== Goaltenders ===
Regular season
Player	GP	GS	TOI	W	L	OT	GA	GAA	SA	SV%	SO	G	A	PIM
Semyon Varlamov	45	39	2,517:19	19	14	6	110	2.62	1,278	.914	2	0	0	0
Thomas Greiss	31	29	1,595:56	16	9	4	73	2.74	838	.913	0	0	0	2

Playoffs
Player	GP	GS	TOI	W	L	GA	GAA	SA	SV%	SO	G	A	PIM
Semyon Varlamov	20	19	1,232:44	11	7	44	2.14	559	.921	2	0	0	2
Thomas Greiss	4	3	178:07	2	2	6	2.02	84	.929	1	0	0	0

- ^{†} Denotes player spent time with another team before joining the Islanders. Stats reflect time with the Islanders only.
- ^{‡} Denotes player was traded mid-season. Stats reflect time with the Islanders only.
- Bold/italics denotes franchise record.

== Awards and honors ==
=== Awards ===
Regular season
Player	Award	Date
Lou Lamoriello	Jim Gregory General Manager of the Year Award	September 12, 2020

== Transactions ==
The Islanders have been involved in the following transactions during the 2019–20 season.

=== Trades ===
Date	Details		Ref
February 16, 2020	To New Jersey Devils David Quenneville; 2nd-round pick in 2021	To New York Islanders Andy Greene	
February 24, 2020	To Ottawa Senators Conditional 1st-round pick in 2020; 2nd-round pick in 2020; Conditional 3rd-round pick in 2022	To New York Islanders Jean-Gabriel Pageau	
February 24, 2020	To Toronto Maple Leafs Matt Lorito	To New York Islanders Jordan Schmaltz	

=== Free agents ===
Date	Player	Team	Contract term	Ref
July 1, 2019	Valtteri Filppula	to Detroit Red Wings	2-year	
July 1, 2019	Robin Lehner	to Chicago Blackhawks	1-year	
July 1, 2019	Semyon Varlamov	from Colorado Avalanche	4-year	
July 2, 2019	Cole Bardreau	from Philadelphia Flyers	2-year	
July 10, 2019	Jared Coreau	from St. Louis Blues	1-year	
July 11, 2019	Steve Bernier	to Bridgeport Sound Tigers (AHL)	1-year	
July 11, 2019	John Stevens	to Bridgeport Sound Tigers (AHL)	1-year	
August 21, 2019	Derick Brassard	from Colorado Avalanche	1-year	
October 22, 2019	Luca Sbisa	to Anaheim Ducks	1-year	
July 31, 2020	Linus Söderström	to Ässät (Liiga)	1-year	

=== Retirement ===
Date	Player	Ref
August 1, 2019	Stephen Gionta	
October 23, 2019	Dennis Seidenberg	

=== Signings ===
Date	Player	Contract term	Ref
July 1, 2019	Tom Kühnhackl	1-year	
July 1, 2019	Anders Lee	7-year	
July 15, 2019	Simon Holmström	3-year	
August 19, 2019	Michael Dal Colle	2-year	
August 19, 2019	Josh Ho-Sang	1-year	
August 28, 2019	Anthony Beauvillier	2-year	
February 24, 2020	Jean-Gabriel Pageau	6-year	
April 30, 2020	Samuel Bolduc	3-year	
May 28, 2020	Félix Bibeau	3-year	
May 28, 2020	Cole Coskey	3-year	
May 28, 2020	Blade Jenkins	3-year	
July 14, 2020	Ilya Sorokin	1-year	

== Draft picks ==
Below are the New York Islanders' selections at the 2019 NHL entry draft, which was held on June 21 and 22, 2019, at Rogers Arena in Vancouver, British Columbia.

Round	#	Player	Pos	Nationality	College/junior/club team
1	23	Simon Holmström	RW	Sweden	HV71 J20 (J20 SuperElit)
2	57^{1}	Samuel Bolduc	D	Canada	Blainville-Boisbriand Armada (QMJHL)
5	147	Reece Newkirk	C	Canada	Portland Winterhawks (WHL)
6	178	Félix Bibeau	C	Canada	Rouyn-Noranda Huskies (QMJHL)
7	209	Cole Coskey	RW	United States	Saginaw Spirit (OHL)

1. The Calgary Flames' second-round pick went to the New York Islanders as the result of a trade on June 24, 2017, that sent Travis Hamonic and a conditional fourth-round pick in 2019 to Calgary in exchange for a first and second-round pick in 2018 and this pick (being conditional at the time of the trade).
