= 2019–20 New Jersey Devils season =

National Hockey League season

2019–20 New Jersey Devils
- Division: 8th Metropolitan
- Conference: 14th Eastern
- 2019–20 record: 28–29–12
- Home record: 13–11–10
- Road record: 15–18–2
- Goals for: 189
- Goals against: 230

Team information
- General manager: Ray Shero (Oct. 4 – Jan. 12); Tom Fitzgerald (interim, Jan. 12 – Mar. 12)
- Coach: John Hynes (Oct. 4 – Dec. 3); Alain Nasreddine (interim, Dec. 3 – Mar. 12)
- Captain: Andy Greene (Oct. 4 – Feb. 16); Vacant (Feb. 16 – Mar. 12)
- Alternate captains: Taylor Hall (Oct. 4 – Dec. 16); Nico Hischier (Jan. 4 – Mar. 12); Kyle Palmieri (Dec. 13 – Mar. 12); Travis Zajac
- Arena: Prudential Center
- Average attendance: 14,899
- Minor league affiliates: Binghamton Devils (AHL); Adirondack Thunder (ECHL)

Team leaders
- Goals: Kyle Palmieri (25)
- Assists: Nikita Gusev (31)
- Points: Kyle Palmieri (45)
- Penalty minutes: P. K. Subban (79)
- Plus/minus: Kevin Rooney (+8)
- Wins: Mackenzie Blackwood (22)
- Goals against average: Mackenzie Blackwood (2.77)

The 2019–20 New Jersey Devils season was the 46th season for the National Hockey League (NHL) franchise that was established on June 11, 1974, and 38th season since the franchise relocated from Colorado prior to the 1982–83 NHL season. For the second time in three years, the Devils received the first overall pick in the 2019 NHL entry draft and selected Jack Hughes first overall.

The season was suspended by the league officials on March 12, 2020, after several other professional and collegiate sports organizations followed suit as a result of the ongoing COVID-19 pandemic. On May 26, the NHL regular season was officially declared over with the remaining games being cancelled and the Devils missed the playoffs for the second straight year, as well as the seventh time in the past eight seasons.

== Standings ==
=== Divisional standings ===
Metropolitan Division
Pos	Team	GP	W	L	OTL	RW	GF	GA	GD	Pts
1	Washington Capitals	69	41	20	8	31	240	215	+25	90
2	Philadelphia Flyers	69	41	21	7	31	232	196	+36	89
3	Pittsburgh Penguins	69	40	23	6	29	224	196	+28	86
4	Carolina Hurricanes	68	38	25	5	27	222	193	+29	81
5	Columbus Blue Jackets	70	33	22	15	25	180	187	−7	81
6	New York Islanders	68	35	23	10	24	192	193	−1	80
7	New York Rangers	70	37	28	5	31	234	222	+12	79
8	New Jersey Devils	69	28	29	12	22	189	230	−41	68

Source: National Hockey League

=== Conference standings ===
Pos	Team	GP	W	L	OTL	RW	GF	GA	GD	PCT	Qualification
1	Boston Bruins	70	44	14	12	38	227	174	+53	.714	Advance to Seeding round-robin tournament
2	Tampa Bay Lightning	70	43	21	6	35	245	195	+50	.657	Advance to Seeding round-robin tournament
3	Washington Capitals	69	41	20	8	31	240	215	+25	.652	Advance to Seeding round-robin tournament
4	Philadelphia Flyers	69	41	21	7	31	232	196	+36	.645	Advance to Seeding round-robin tournament
5	Pittsburgh Penguins	69	40	23	6	29	224	196	+28	.623	Advance to 2020 Stanley Cup playoffs qualifying round
6	Carolina Hurricanes	68	38	25	5	27	222	193	+29	.596	Advance to 2020 Stanley Cup playoffs qualifying round
7	New York Islanders	68	35	23	10	24	192	193	−1	.588	Advance to 2020 Stanley Cup playoffs qualifying round
8	Toronto Maple Leafs	70	36	25	9	28	238	227	+11	.579	Advance to 2020 Stanley Cup playoffs qualifying round
9	Columbus Blue Jackets	70	33	22	15	25	180	187	−7	.579	Advance to 2020 Stanley Cup playoffs qualifying round
10	Florida Panthers	69	35	26	8	30	231	228	+3	.565	Advance to 2020 Stanley Cup playoffs qualifying round
11	New York Rangers	70	37	28	5	31	234	222	+12	.564	Advance to 2020 Stanley Cup playoffs qualifying round
12	Montreal Canadiens	71	31	31	9	19	212	221	−9	.500	Advance to 2020 Stanley Cup playoffs qualifying round
13	Buffalo Sabres	69	30	31	8	22	195	217	−22	.493	
14	New Jersey Devils	69	28	29	12	22	189	230	−41	.493	
15	Ottawa Senators	71	25	34	12	18	191	243	−52	.437	
16	Detroit Red Wings	71	17	49	5	13	145	267	−122	.275	

Source: National Hockey League

== Schedule and results ==
=== Preseason ===
The preseason schedule was published on June 18, 2019.

2019 preseason game log: 5–2–0 (Home: 3–0–0; Road: 2–2–0)
#	Date	Visitor	Score	Home	OT	Decision	Attendance	Record	Recap
1^{[A]}	September 16	Boston	3–4	New Jersey	OT	Senn	8,652	1–0–0
2^{[A]}	September 16	New Jersey	2–4	Montreal		Cormier	19,080	1–1–0
3	September 18	New Jersey	4–3	NY Rangers		Schneider	16,688	2–1–0
4	September 20	NY Rangers	2–4	New Jersey		Blackwood	12,307	3–1–0
5	September 21	NY Islanders	3–4	New Jersey		Schneider	10,652	4–1–0
6	September 25	New Jersey	0–2	Boston		Blackwood	17,565	4–2–0
7	September 27	New Jersey	2–0	Columbus		Schneider	12,347	5–2–0
Notes:^{A} Indicates split-squad.

=== Regular season ===
The regular season schedule was published on June 25, 2019.

2019–20 game log

October: 2–5–3 (Home: 2–2–3; Road: 0–3–0)
#	Date	Visitor	Score	Home	OT	Decision	Attendance	Record	Pts	Recap
1	October 4	Winnipeg	5–4	New Jersey	SO	Blackwood	16,514	0–0–1	1
2	October 5	New Jersey	2–7	Buffalo		Blackwood	19,070	0–1–1	1
3	October 9	New Jersey	0–4	Philadelphia		Schneider	19,658	0–2–1	1
4	October 10	Edmonton	4–3	New Jersey	SO	Blackwood	14,586	0–2–2	2
5	October 12	New Jersey	0–3	Boston		Schneider	17,193	0–3–2	2
6	October 14	Florida	6–4	New Jersey		Schneider	13,208	0–4–2	2
7	October 17	NY Rangers	2–5	New Jersey		Blackwood	16,514	1–4–2	4
8	October 19	Vancouver	0–1	New Jersey		Blackwood	13,818	2–4–2	6
9	October 25	Arizona	5–3	New Jersey		Blackwood	14,724	2–5–2	6
10	October 30	Tampa Bay	7–6	New Jersey	OT	Schneider	13,152	2–5–3	7

November: 7–7–1 (Home: 2–4–1; Road: 5–3–0)
#	Date	Visitor	Score	Home	OT	Decision	Attendance	Record	Pts	Recap
11	November 1	Philadelphia	4–3	New Jersey	SO	Blackwood	14,624	2–5–4	8
12	November 2	New Jersey	5–3	Carolina		Blackwood	15,079	3–5–4	10
13	November 5	New Jersey	2–1	Winnipeg	SO	Blackwood	15,325	4–5–4	12
14	November 7	New Jersey	2–5	Calgary		Blackwood	18,851	4–6–4	12
15	November 8	New Jersey	0–4	Edmonton		Schneider	17,240	4–7–4	12
16	November 10	New Jersey	2–1	Vancouver		Blackwood	18,871	5–7–4	14
17	November 13	Ottawa	4–2	New Jersey		Blackwood	13,438	5–8–4	14
18	November 15	Pittsburgh	1–2	New Jersey		Blackwood	16,514	6–8–4	16
19	November 16	New Jersey	4–3	Montreal	OT	Blackwood	21,016	7–8–4	18
20	November 19	Boston	5–1	New Jersey		Blackwood	15,061	7–9–4	18
21	November 22	New Jersey	1–4	Pittsburgh		Blackwood	18,420	7–10–4	18
22	November 23	Detroit	1–5	New Jersey		Domingue	16,514	8–10–4	20
23	November 26	Minnesota	3–2	New Jersey		Domingue	14,627	8–11–4	20
24	November 28	New Jersey	6–4	Montreal		Blackwood	20,876	9–11–4	22
25	November 30	NY Rangers	4–0	New Jersey		Blackwood	16,514	9–12–4	22

December: 5–7–2 (Home: 2–2–2; Road: 3–5–0)
#	Date	Visitor	Score	Home	OT	Decision	Attendance	Record	Pts	Recap
26	December 2	New Jersey	1–7	Buffalo		Domingue	15,422	9–13–4	22
27	December 3	Vegas	4–3	New Jersey		Blackwood	12,831	9–14–4	22
28	December 6	Chicago	2–1	New Jersey	SO	Blackwood	15,273	9–14–5	23
29	December 7	New Jersey	4–6	Nashville		Domingue	17,418	9–15–5	23
30	December 10	New Jersey	0–2	Dallas		Blackwood	18,134	9–16–5	23
31	December 13	New Jersey	1–3	Colorado		Domingue	18,034	9–17–5	23
32	December 14	New Jersey	2–1	Arizona		Blackwood	17,125	10–17–5	25
33	December 18	Anaheim	1–3	New Jersey		Blackwood	13,936	11–17–5	27
34	December 20	Washington	6–3	New Jersey		Blackwood	15,021	11–18–5	27
35	December 21	New Jersey	1–5	Columbus		Senn	17,188	11–19–5	27
36	December 23	New Jersey	7–1	Chicago		Blackwood	21,559	12–19–5	29
37	December 27	Toronto	5–4	New Jersey	OT	Blackwood	16,514	12–19–6	30
38	December 29	New Jersey	4–3	Ottawa	OT	Blackwood	14,005	13–19–6	32
39	December 31	Boston	2–3	New Jersey	SO	Blackwood	16,514	14–19–6	34

January: 4–5–2 (Home: 1–1–2; Road: 3–4–0)
#	Date	Visitor	Score	Home	OT	Decision	Attendance	Record	Pts	Recap
40	January 2	New Jersey	2–1	NY Islanders		Blackwood	13,917	15–19–6	36
41	January 4	Colorado	5–2	New Jersey		Blackwood	16,514	15–20–6	36
42	January 7	NY Islanders	4–3	New Jersey	OT	Blackwood	14,518	15–20–7	37
43	January 9	New Jersey	3–6	NY Rangers		Blackwood	17,007	15–21–7	37
44	January 11	New Jersey	5–1	Washington		Domingue	18,573	16–21–7	39
45	January 12	Tampa Bay	1–3	New Jersey		Domingue	14,203	17–21–7	41
46	January 14	New Jersey	4–7	Toronto		Domingue	19,124	17–22–7	41
47	January 16	New Jersey	2–5	Washington		Schneider	18,573	17–23–7	41
48	January 18	New Jersey	0–5	Columbus		Schneider	18,680	17–24–7	41
49	January 27	New Jersey	4–3	Ottawa	SO	Blackwood	9,673	18–24–7	43
50	January 30	Nashville	6–5	New Jersey	SO	Blackwood	14,327	18–24–8	44

February: 7–3–4 (Home: 5–1–2; Road: 2–2–2)
#	Date	Visitor	Score	Home	OT	Decision	Attendance	Record	Pts	Recap
51	February 1	Dallas	3–2	New Jersey	OT	Domingue	16,514	18–24–9	45
52	February 4	Montreal	5–4	New Jersey	SO	Domingue	13,283	18–24–10	46
53	February 6	New Jersey	5–0	Philadelphia		Blackwood	19,070	19–24–10	48
54	February 8	Los Angeles	0–3	New Jersey		Blackwood	16,514	20–24–10	50
55	February 11	Florida	5–3	New Jersey		Domingue	12,732	20–25–10	50
56	February 13	Detroit	1–4	New Jersey		Blackwood	12,941	21–25–10	52
57	February 14	New Jersey	2–5	Carolina		Domingue	18,680	21–26–10	52
58	February 16	Columbus	3–4	New Jersey	SO	Blackwood	16,514	22–26–10	54
59	February 18	New Jersey	0–3	St. Louis		Domingue	18,096	22–27–10	54
60	February 20	San Jose	1–2	New Jersey		Blackwood	13,941	23–27–10	56
61	February 22	Washington	2–3	New Jersey		Blackwood	16,514	24–27–10	58
62	February 25	New Jersey	4–1	Detroit		Schneider	17,525	25–27–10	60
63	February 27	New Jersey	2–3	San Jose	OT	Schneider	16,913	25–27–11	61
64	February 29	New Jersey	1–2	Los Angeles	OT	Blackwood	17,372	25–27–12	62

March: 3–2–0 (Home: 1–1–0; Road: 2–1–0)
#	Date	Visitor	Score	Home	OT	Decision	Attendance	Record	Pts	Recap
65	March 1	New Jersey	3–0	Anaheim		Schneider	16,195	26–27–12	64
66	March 3	New Jersey	0–3	Vegas		Blackwood	18,290	26–28–12	64
67	March 6	St. Louis	2–4	New Jersey		Schneider	14,685	27–28–12	66
68	March 7	New Jersey	6–4	NY Rangers		Blackwood	17,542	28–28–12	68
69	March 10	Pittsburgh	5–2	New Jersey		Blackwood	13,473	28–29–12	68

Cancelled games
#	Date	Visitor	Home
70	March 12	Carolina	New Jersey
71	March 14	New Jersey	Florida
72	March 15	New Jersey	Tampa Bay
73	March 17	New Jersey	Toronto
74	March 19	Calgary	New Jersey
75	March 21	NY Islanders	New Jersey
76	March 23	Columbus	New Jersey
77	March 26	New Jersey	Minnesota
78	March 28	Philadelphia	New Jersey
79	March 29	Carolina	New Jersey
80	March 31	New Jersey	Pittsburgh
81	April 2	Buffalo	New Jersey
82	April 4	New Jersey	NY Islanders

Legend: Win (2 points) Loss (0 points) Overtime/shootout loss (1 point)

== Player statistics ==
As of March 12, 2020

=== Skaters ===
Regular season
Player	GP	G	A	Pts	+/−	PIM
Kyle Palmieri	65	25	20	45	–4	41
Nikita Gusev	66	13	31	44	–15	12
Nico Hischier	58	14	22	36	–16	12
Jesper Bratt	60	16	16	32	–6	6
Pavel Zacha	65	8	24	32	–12	14
Blake Coleman^{‡}	57	21	10	31	–2	40
Damon Severson	69	8	23	31	–20	52
Travis Zajac	69	9	16	25	–12	28
Taylor Hall^{‡}	30	6	19	25	–11	20
Wayne Simmonds^{‡}	61	8	16	24	–17	64
Miles Wood	68	11	12	23	–19	57
Sami Vatanen^{‡}	47	5	18	23	–12	22
Jack Hughes	61	7	14	21	–26	10
Will Butcher	56	4	17	21	–8	6
P. K. Subban	68	7	11	18	–21	79
Andy Greene^{‡}	53	2	9	11	+1	14
Kevin Rooney	49	4	5	9	+8	20
Mirco Müller	50	2	5	7	–13	23
Joey Anderson	18	4	2	6	+1	2
Connor Carrick	29	1	5	6	–6	17
Jesper Boqvist	35	4	0	4	–11	8
John Hayden	43	3	1	4	–2	77
Dakota Mermis	10	1	3	4	+7	4
Matt Tennyson	20	0	3	3	–2	6
Fredrik Claesson^{†}	5	1	1	2	+1	0
Nick Merkley	4	1	1	2	0	2
Michael McLeod	12	0	2	2	+4	4
Ben Street	3	0	1	1	+1	0
Brett Seney	2	0	0	0	–1	0
Josh Jacobs	2	0	0	0	+1	2
Colton White	6	0	0	0	–2	4
Janne Kuokkanen^{†}	1	0	0	0	0	0

=== Goaltenders ===
Regular season
Player	GP	GS	TOI	W	L	OT	GA	GAA	SA	SV%	SO	G	A	PIM
Mackenzie Blackwood	47	43	2,684:01	22	14	8	124	2.77	1,452	.915	3	0	1	0
Cory Schneider	13	11	679:16	3	6	2	40	3.53	355	.887	1	0	0	0
Louis Domingue^{‡}	16	14	743:32	3	8	2	47	3.79	399	.882	0	0	0	0
Gilles Senn	2	1	70:05	0	1	0	4	3.42	41	.902	0	0	0	0

- ^{†} Denotes player spent time with another team before joining the Devils. Stats reflect time with the Devils only.
- ^{‡} Denotes player was traded mid-season. Stats reflect time with the Devils only.
- Bold/italics denotes franchise record.

== Transactions ==
The Devils have been involved in the following transactions during the 2019–20 season.

=== Trades ===
Date	Details		Ref
June 22, 2019	To Chicago Blackhawks John Quenneville	To New Jersey Devils John Hayden	
June 22, 2019	To Nashville Predators Steven Santini; Jeremy Davies; 2nd-round pick in 2019; 2nd-round pick in 2020	To New Jersey Devils P. K. Subban	
June 23, 2019	To Nashville Predators Future considerations	To New Jersey Devils Adam Helewka	
July 29, 2019	To Vegas Golden Knights 3rd-round pick in 2020; 2nd-round pick in 2021	To New Jersey Devils Nikita Gusev	
November 1, 2019	To Tampa Bay Lightning Conditional 7th-round pick in 2021	To New Jersey Devils Louis Domingue	
December 16, 2019	To Arizona Coyotes Taylor Hall; Blake Speers	To New Jersey Devils Kevin Bahl; Nick Merkley; Nate Schnarr; Conditional 1st-round pick in 2020; Conditional 3rd-round pick in 2021	
February 16, 2020	To New York Islanders Andy Greene	To New Jersey Devils David Quenneville; 2nd-round pick in 2021	
February 16, 2020	To Tampa Bay Lightning Blake Coleman	To New Jersey Devils Nolan Foote; Conditional 1st-round pick in 2020	
February 24, 2020	To Buffalo Sabres Wayne Simmonds	To New Jersey Devils Conditional 5th-round pick in 2021	
February 24, 2020	To Carolina Hurricanes Sami Vatanen	To New Jersey Devils Fredrik Claesson; Janne Kuokkanen; Conditional 4th-round pick in 2020	
February 24, 2020	To Vancouver Canucks Louis Domingue	To New Jersey Devils Zane McIntyre	

=== Free agents ===
Date	Player	Team	Contract term	Ref
July 1, 2019	Kurtis Gabriel	to Philadelphia Flyers	1-year	
July 1, 2019	Nick Lappin	to St. Louis Blues	1-year	
July 1, 2019	Dakota Mermis	from Arizona Coyotes	1-year	
July 1, 2019	Blake Pietila	to Anaheim Ducks	1-year	
July 1, 2019	Wayne Simmonds	from Nashville Predators	1-year	
July 1, 2019	Ben Street	from Anaheim Ducks	1-year	
July 1, 2019	Matt Tennyson	from Buffalo Sabres	2-year	
July 16, 2019	Cam Johnson	to Milwaukee Admirals (AHL)	1-year	
July 24, 2019	Kenny Agostino	to Toronto Maple Leafs	2-year	
August 19, 2019	Eric Tangradi	to Barys Nur-Sultan (KHL)	1-year	
October 4, 2019	Stefan Noesen	to Wilkes-Barre/Scranton Penguins (AHL)	1-year	
October 6, 2019	Joe Morrow	from Winnipeg Jets	1-year	
February 23, 2020	Julian Melchiori	from Binghamton Devils (AHL)	1-year	
July 18, 2020	Julian Melchiori	to Neftekhimik Nizhnekamsk (KHL)	1-year	

=== Contract terminations ===
Date	Player	Via	Ref
June 28, 2019	Adam Helewka	Mutual termination	
December 15, 2019	Joe Morrow	Mutual termination	

=== Retirement ===
Date	Player	Ref
September 22, 2019	Eric Gryba	

=== Signings ===
Date	Player	Contract term	Ref
July 12, 2019	Jack Hughes	3-year	
July 15, 2019	Brandon Baddock	1-year	
July 15, 2019	Josh Jacobs	1-year	
July 16, 2019	Connor Carrick	2-year	
July 22, 2019	Mirco Müller	1-year	
July 29, 2019	Nikita Gusev	2-year	
July 31, 2019	Will Butcher	3-year	
September 10, 2019	Pavel Zacha	3-year	
October 19, 2019	Nico Hischier	7-year	
December 30, 2019	Nikita Okhotiuk	3-year	
August 10, 2020	Reilly Walsh	3-year	

== Draft picks ==
Below are the New Jersey Devils' selections at the 2019 NHL entry draft, which was held on June 21 and 22, 2019, at Rogers Arena in Vancouver, British Columbia.

Round	#	Player	Pos	Nationality	College/junior/club team
1	1	Jack Hughes	C	United States	U.S. NTDP (USHL)
2	61^{1}	Nikita Okhotiuk	D	Russia	Ottawa 67's (OHL)
3	70^{2}	Daniil Misyul	D	Russia	Loko Yaroslavl (MHL)
3	80^{3}	Graeme Clarke	RW	Canada	Ottawa 67's (OHL)
3	82^{4}	Michael Vukojevic	D	Canada	Kitchener Rangers (OHL)
4	96	Tyce Thompson	RW	Canada	Providence (Hockey East)
4	118^{5}	Case McCarthy	D	United States	U.S. NTDP (USHL)
5	127	Cole Brady	G	Canada	Janesville Jets (NAHL)
5	129^{6}	Arseni Gritsyuk	LW	Russia	Omskie Yastreby (MHL)
6	158	Patrick Moynihan	RW	United States	U.S. NTDP (USHL)
7	189	Nikola Pasic	RW	Sweden	Linköpings J20 (J20 SuperElit)

1. The Boston Bruins' second-round pick went to the New Jersey Devils as the result of a trade on February 25, 2019, that sent Marcus Johansson to Boston in exchange for a fourth-round pick in 2020 and this pick.
2. The Anaheim Ducks' third-round pick went to the New Jersey Devils as the result of a trade on November 30, 2017, that sent Adam Henrique, Joseph Blandisi and a third-round pick in 2018 to Anaheim in exchange for Sami Vatanen and this pick (being conditional at the time of the trade).
3. The Dallas Stars' third-round pick went to the New Jersey Devils as the result of a trade on February 23, 2019, that sent Ben Lovejoy to Dallas in exchange for Connor Carrick and this pick.
4. The Winnipeg Jets' third-round pick went to the New Jersey Devils as the result of a trade on June 22, 2019, that sent Nashville's second-round pick in 2019 (55th overall) to San Jose in exchange for a third-round pick in 2019 (91st overall) and this pick.
5. The Washington Capitals' fourth-round pick went to the New Jersey Devils as the result of a trade on June 22, 2019, that sent San Jose's third-round pick in 2019 (91st overall) to Washington in exchange for Buffalo's fifth-round pick in 2019 (129th overall) and this pick.
6. The Buffalo Sabres' fifth-round pick went to the New Jersey Devils as the result of a trade on June 22, 2019, that sent San Jose's third-round pick in 2019 (91st overall) to Washington in exchange for a fourth-round pick in 2019 (118th overall) and this pick.
