= List of 2019–20 NHL Three Star Awards =

The 2019–20 NHL Three Star Awards are the way the National Hockey League denotes its players of the week and players of the month of the 2019–20 season.

== Weekly ==
Weekly
| Week | First Star | Second Star | Third Star |
|---|---|---|---|
| October 6, 2019 | Mika Zibanejad (New York Rangers) | Anthony Mantha (Detroit Red Wings) | Auston Matthews (Toronto Maple Leafs) |
| October 13, 2019 | Connor McDavid (Edmonton Oilers) | Patrik Laine (Winnipeg Jets) | Sidney Crosby (Pittsburgh Penguins) |
| October 20, 2019 | David Pastrnak (Boston Bruins) | John Carlson (Washington Capitals) | Carter Hutton (Buffalo Sabres) |
| October 27, 2019 | Brad Marchand (Boston Bruins) | Roman Josi (Nashville Predators) | Brian Elliott (Philadelphia Flyers) |
| November 3, 2019 | Elias Pettersson (Vancouver Canucks) | Jakub Vrana (Washington Capitals) | Mike Smith (Edmonton Oilers) |
| November 10, 2019 | Anders Nilsson (Ottawa Senators) | Auston Matthews (Toronto Maple Leafs) | Cale Makar (Colorado Avalanche) |
| November 17, 2019 | Connor McDavid (Edmonton Oilers) | Nathan MacKinnon (Colorado Avalanche) | Keith Yandle (Florida Panthers) |
| November 24, 2019 | Brad Marchand (Boston Bruins) | Connor McDavid (Edmonton Oilers) | Brock Nelson (New York Islanders) |
| December 1, 2019 | Nathan MacKinnon (Colorado Avalanche) | David Rittich (Calgary Flames) | Martin Jones (San Jose Sharks) |
| December 8, 2019 | John Carlson (Washington Capitals) | Tristan Jarry (Pittsburgh Penguins) | Jack Eichel (Buffalo Sabres) |
| December 15, 2019 | Max Pacioretty (Vegas Golden Knights) | Anthony Duclair (Ottawa Senators) | Jack Eichel (Buffalo Sabres) |
| December 22, 2019 | Noel Acciari (Florida Panthers) | Roman Josi (Nashville Predators) | Joonas Korpisalo (Columbus Blue Jackets) |
| December 29, 2019 | Victor Hedman (Tampa Bay Lightning) | Jordan Binnington (St. Louis Blues) | John Tavares (Toronto Maple Leafs) |
| January 5, 2020 | Nathan MacKinnon (Colorado Avalanche) | Mark Scheifele (Winnipeg Jets) | Zach Werenski (Columbus Blue Jackets) |
| January 12, 2020 | Andrei Vasilevskiy (Tampa Bay Lightning) | Tony DeAngelo (New York Rangers) | Cam Talbot (Calgary Flames) |
| January 19, 2020 | Alexander Ovechkin (Washington Capitals) | Elvis Merzlikins (Columbus Blue Jackets) | Jonathan Toews (Chicago Blackhawks) |
| January 26, 2020 | Not named due to the All-Star Game. | | |
| February 2, 2020 | Leon Draisaitl (Edmonton Oilers) | Steven Stamkos (Tampa Bay Lightning) | J. T. Miller (Vancouver Canucks) |
| February 9, 2020 | Elvis Merzlikins (Columbus Blue Jackets) | Kyle Connor (Winnipeg Jets) | Andrei Vasilevskiy (Tampa Bay Lightning) |
| February 16, 2020 | Leon Draisaitl (Edmonton Oilers) | Andrei Vasilevskiy (Tampa Bay Lightning) | Tyler Toffoli (Los Angeles Kings) |
| February 23, 2020 | Pavel Francouz (Colorado Avalanche) | Mika Zibanejad (New York Rangers) | Andrew Mangiapane (Calgary Flames) |
| March 1, 2020 | Kevin Fiala (Minnesota Wild) | Ryan Ellis (Nashville Predators) | Pavel Francouz (Colorado Avalanche) |
| March 8, 2020 | Mika Zibanejad (New York Rangers) | Gabriel Landeskog (Colorado Avalanche) | Leon Draisaitl (Edmonton Oilers) |

== Monthly ==
Monthly
| Month | First Star | Second Star | Third Star |
|---|---|---|---|
| October | John Carlson (Washington Capitals) | David Pastrnak (Boston Bruins) | Leon Draisaitl (Edmonton Oilers) |
| November | Connor McDavid (Edmonton Oilers) | Nathan MacKinnon (Colorado Avalanche) | Patrick Kane (Chicago Blackhawks) |
| December | Jonathan Huberdeau (Florida Panthers) | Tristan Jarry (Pittsburgh Penguins) | Artemi Panarin (New York Rangers) |
| January | Alexander Ovechkin (Washington Capitals) | Leon Draisaitl (Edmonton Oilers) | Andrei Vasilevskiy (Tampa Bay Lightning) |
| February | Leon Draisaitl (Edmonton Oilers) | Mika Zibanejad (New York Rangers) | David Pastrnak (Boston Bruins) |

== Rookie of the Month ==
Rookie of the Month
| Month | Player |
|---|---|
| October | Victor Olofsson (Buffalo Sabres) |
| November | Cale Makar (Colorado Avalanche) |
| December | Victor Olofsson (Buffalo Sabres) |
| January | Dominik Kubalik (Chicago Blackhawks) |
| February | Quinn Hughes (Vancouver Canucks) |
