= 2019–20 Vancouver Canucks season =

Professional ice hockey team season

2019–20 Vancouver Canucks
- Division: 3rd Pacific
- Conference: 7th Western
- 2019–20 record: 36–27–6
- Home record: 22–9–4
- Road record: 14–18–2
- Goals for: 228
- Goals against: 217

Team information
- General manager: Jim Benning
- Coach: Travis Green
- Captain: Bo Horvat
- Alternate captains: Alexander Edler; Brandon Sutter; Christopher Tanev
- Arena: Rogers Arena
- Average attendance: 18,679
- Minor league affiliates: Utica Comets (AHL); Kalamazoo Wings (ECHL)

Team leaders
- Goals: J. T. Miller; Elias Pettersson (27)
- Assists: Quinn Hughes; J. T. Miller (45)
- Points: J. T. Miller (72)
- Penalty minutes: Alexander Edler (62)
- Plus/minus: Elias Pettersson (+16)
- Wins: Jacob Markstrom (23)
- Goals against average: Jacob Markstrom (2.75)

The 2019–20 Vancouver Canucks season was the 50th season for the National Hockey League (NHL) franchise that was established on May 22, 1970. The Canucks attempted to return to the postseason for the first time since the 2014–15 season.

The season was suspended by the league officials on March 12, 2020, after several other professional and collegiate sports organizations followed suit as a result of the ongoing COVID-19 pandemic. On May 26, the NHL regular season was officially declared over with the remaining games being cancelled. The Canucks advanced to the playoffs for the first time since the 2014–15 season. They defeated the Minnesota Wild in the qualifying round in four games. The Canucks then defeated the defending Stanley Cup champion St. Louis Blues in the first round of the Stanley Cup Playoffs in six games, advancing to the second round for the first time since the 2010–11 season, where they faced off against the Vegas Golden Knights, losing the series in seven games.

== Off-season ==
The Vancouver Canucks hosted the 2019 NHL entry draft on June 21–22, 2019.

=== Training camp ===
The Canucks held their training camp at Save-On-Foods Memorial Centre in Victoria, British Columbia, from September 13–15. The following day, they hosted a preseason game against the Calgary Flames in Victoria, which they lost 4–3.

== Regular season ==
=== October ===
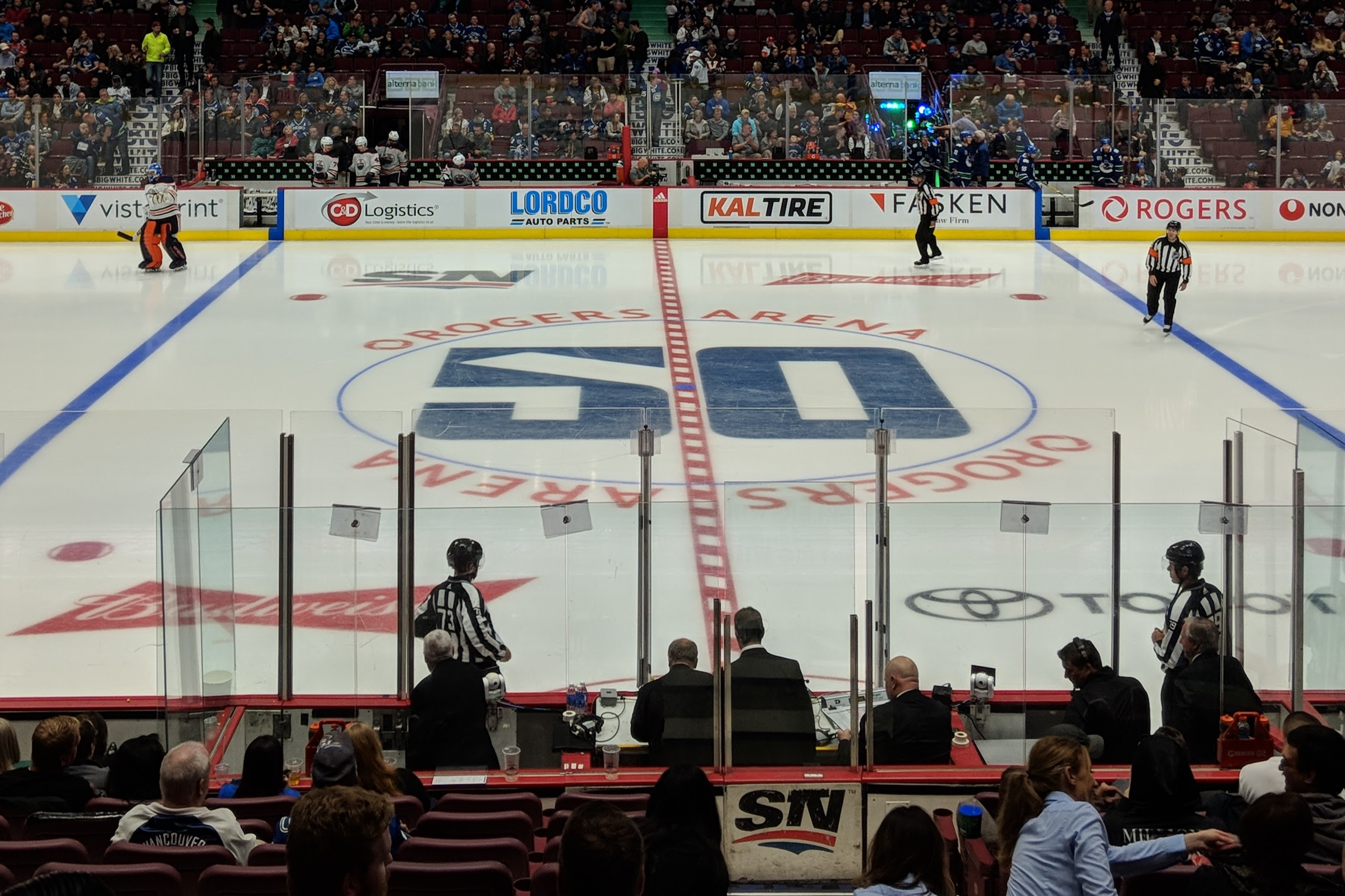
Centre ice logo commemorating the Vancouver Canucks 50th season

The Canucks began their season with a 3–2 loss to the Edmonton Oilers on October 2. After ending their season-opening two-game road trip with a 3–0 loss to the Calgary Flames, the team returned home for their October 9 home opener against the Los Angeles Kings, the same team the Canucks hosted in their inaugural game exactly 49 years earlier. In a special pre-game ceremony, the Canucks named Bo Horvat the 14th captain in team history. The Canucks defeated the Kings 8–2, with rookie defenseman Quinn Hughes scoring his first NHL goal. The Canucks would get back to .500 in their next game by beating the Philadelphia Flyers 3–2 in a shootout. Before the final game of the homestand, Jacob Markstrom left the team for personal reasons, resulting in Thatcher Demko making his first start of the season, where the Canucks won 5–1 over the Detroit Red Wings. The Canucks opened their road trip on October 17 by defeating the defending champion St. Louis Blues 4–3 in a shootout, coming back after being down 3–1 in the game to earn their first road victory of the year. Playing their next two games on back-to-back days, the Canucks were shutout by the New Jersey Devils 1–0, with Quinn's brother Jack Hughes scoring his first NHL goal. however they rebounded and defeated the New York Rangers 3–2 the following day, which included Bo Horvat scoring his 100th career goal. The Canucks concluded their road trip by defeating the Detroit Red Wings 5–2, with Bo Horvat scoring his first career hat-trick and helping Vancouver overcome a 2–0 deficit in the game. On October 25, back at home facing the Washington Capitals, the Canucks surrendered a 5–1 second period lead and lost the game 6–5 in a shootout. The team rebounded in their next game and beat the Florida Panthers 7–2. To close out the month of October, the Canucks began a three-game California road trip by visiting the Los Angeles Kings. Vancouver earned a 5–3 victory in the October 30 game, which included a Brock Boeser hat-trick.

=== November ===
Continuing their road trip, the Canucks opened November with a 2–1 overtime loss to the Anaheim Ducks. They responded the following day by winning 5–2 over the San Jose Sharks. The Canucks earned five of six points on the road trip, and won their first game in San Jose since March 31, 2016. They then proceeded to go 1-5-2 over their next 9 games.

=== End of season ===
At the 2020 NHL Awards, first year defenceman Quinn Hughes would finish second in the Calder Memorial Trophy voting, marking the third consecutive year that a Canucks rookie finished in the top 3 in voting for this award, a feat that has not been matched since the New York Rangers did so from 1969 to 1971.

== Standings ==
=== Divisional standings ===
Pacific Division
Pos	Team	GP	W	L	OTL	RW	GF	GA	GD	Pts
1	Vegas Golden Knights	71	39	24	8	30	227	211	+16	86
2	Edmonton Oilers	71	37	25	9	31	225	217	+8	83
3	Calgary Flames	70	36	27	7	25	210	215	−5	79
4	Vancouver Canucks	69	36	27	6	27	228	217	+11	78
5	Arizona Coyotes	70	33	29	8	26	195	187	+8	74
6	Anaheim Ducks	71	29	33	9	20	187	226	−39	67
7	Los Angeles Kings	70	29	35	6	21	178	212	−34	64
8	San Jose Sharks	70	29	36	5	22	182	226	−44	63

Source: National Hockey League

=== Western Conference ===
Pos	Team	GP	W	L	OTL	RW	GF	GA	GD	PCT	Qualification
1	St. Louis Blues	71	42	19	10	33	225	193	+32	.662	Advance to Seeding round-robin tournament
2	Colorado Avalanche	70	42	20	8	37	237	191	+46	.657	Advance to Seeding round-robin tournament
3	Vegas Golden Knights	71	39	24	8	30	227	211	+16	.606	Advance to Seeding round-robin tournament
4	Dallas Stars	69	37	24	8	26	180	177	+3	.594	Advance to Seeding round-robin tournament
5	Edmonton Oilers	71	37	25	9	31	225	217	+8	.585	Advance to 2020 Stanley Cup playoffs qualifying round
6	Nashville Predators	69	35	26	8	28	215	217	−2	.565	Advance to 2020 Stanley Cup playoffs qualifying round
7	Vancouver Canucks	69	36	27	6	27	228	217	+11	.565	Advance to 2020 Stanley Cup playoffs qualifying round
8	Calgary Flames	70	36	27	7	25	210	215	−5	.564	Advance to 2020 Stanley Cup playoffs qualifying round
9	Winnipeg Jets	71	37	28	6	30	216	203	+13	.563	Advance to 2020 Stanley Cup playoffs qualifying round
10	Minnesota Wild	69	35	27	7	30	220	220	0	.558	Advance to 2020 Stanley Cup playoffs qualifying round
11	Arizona Coyotes	70	33	29	8	26	195	187	+8	.529	Advance to 2020 Stanley Cup playoffs qualifying round
12	Chicago Blackhawks	70	32	30	8	23	212	218	−6	.514	Advance to 2020 Stanley Cup playoffs qualifying round
13	Anaheim Ducks	71	29	33	9	20	187	226	−39	.472	
14	Los Angeles Kings	70	29	35	6	21	178	212	−34	.457	
15	San Jose Sharks	70	29	36	5	22	182	226	−44	.450	

Source: National Hockey League

Tiebreaking procedures

1. Fewer number of games played (only used during regular season).
2. Greater number of regulation wins (denoted by RW).
3. Greater number of wins in regulation and overtime (excluding shootout wins; denoted by ROW).
4. Greater number of total wins (including shootouts).
5. Greater number of points earned in head-to-head play; if teams played an uneven number of head-to-head games, the result of the first game on the home ice of the team with the extra home game is discarded.
6. Greater goal differential (difference between goals for and goals against).
7. Greater number of goals scored (denoted by GF).

== Schedule and results ==
=== Pre-season ===
The Canucks released their pre-season schedule on June 18, 2019.

2019 pre-season game log: 4–4–0 (Home: 2–3–0; Road: 2–1–0)
#	Date	Visitor	Score	Home	OT	Decision	Attendance	Record	Recap
1^{[A]}	September 16	Vancouver	3–2	Calgary	OT	Bachman	17,465	1–0–0
2^{[A]}^{[a]}	September 16	Calgary	4–3	Vancouver		McIntyre	7,006	1–1–0
3	September 17	Edmonton	2–4	Vancouver		Demko	17,738	2–1–0
4	September 19	Vancouver	6–1	Edmonton		Markstrom	15,789	3–1–0
5^{[b]}	September 21	Vancouver	5–7	Los Angeles		Bachman	10,014	3–2–0
6^{[c]}	September 23	Ottawa	4–6	Vancouver		Markstrom	7,046	4–2–0
7	September 25	Ottawa	6–2	Vancouver		Demko	18,781	4–3–0
8	September 26	Arizona	4–2	Vancouver		Markstrom	18,528	4–4–0
Notes:^{A} Indicates split-squad.^{a} Game was played at Save-On-Foods Memorial Centre in Victoria, British Columbia.^{b} Game was played at Vivint Smart Home Arena in Salt Lake City, Utah.^{c} Game was played at Abbotsford Centre in Abbotsford, British Columbia.

=== Regular season ===
The regular season schedule was released on June 25, 2019.

2019–20 game log

October: 8–3–1 (Home: 4–0–1; Road: 4–3–0)
#	Date	Visitor	Score	Home	OT	Decision	Attendance	Record	Pts	Recap
1	October 2	Vancouver	2–3	Edmonton		Markstrom	18,347	0–1–0	0
2	October 5	Vancouver	0–3	Calgary		Markstrom	19,005	0–2–0	0
3	October 9	Los Angeles	2–8	Vancouver		Markstrom	18,955	1–2–0	2
4	October 12	Philadelphia	2–3	Vancouver	SO	Markstrom	18,652	2–2–0	4
5	October 15	Detroit	1–5	Vancouver		Demko	18,183	3–2–0	6
6	October 17	Vancouver	4–3	St. Louis	SO	Demko	18,096	4–2–0	8
7	October 19	Vancouver	0–1	New Jersey		Demko	13,818	4–3–0	8
8	October 20	Vancouver	3–2	NY Rangers		Markstrom	17,030	5–3–0	10
9	October 22	Vancouver	5–2	Detroit		Markstrom	18,455	6–3–0	12
10	October 25	Washington	6–5	Vancouver	SO	Markstrom	18,871	6–3–1	13
11	October 28	Florida	2–7	Vancouver		Demko	17,864	7–3–1	15
12	October 30	Vancouver	5–3	Los Angeles		Markstrom	15,565	8–3–1	17

November: 5–7–3 (Home: 1–2–2; Road: 4–5–1)
#	Date	Visitor	Score	Home	OT	Decision	Attendance	Record	Pts	Recap
13	November 1	Vancouver	1–2	Anaheim	OT	Markstrom	15,173	8–3–2	18
14	November 2	Vancouver	5–2	San Jose		Demko	16,480	9–3–2	20
15	November 5	St. Louis	2–1	Vancouver	OT	Markstrom	17,789	9–3–3	21
16	November 7	Vancouver	2–5	Chicago		Markstrom	21,418	9–4–3	21
17	November 8	Vancouver	1–4	Winnipeg		Demko	15,325	9–5–3	21
18	November 10	New Jersey	2–1	Vancouver		Markstrom	18,871	9–6–3	21
19	November 12	Nashville	3–5	Vancouver		Demko	18,233	10–6–3	23
20	November 14	Dallas	4–2	Vancouver		Markstrom	18,642	10–7–3	23
21	November 16	Colorado	5–4	Vancouver	OT	Demko	18,409	10–7–4	24
22	November 19	Vancouver	1–6	Dallas		Markstrom	18,198	10–8–4	24
23	November 21	Vancouver	6–3	Nashville		Markstrom	17,168	11–8–4	26
24	November 23	Vancouver	2–1	Washington	SO	Markstrom	18,573	12–8–4	28
25	November 25	Vancouver	1–2	Philadelphia		Demko	17,083	12–9–4	28
26	November 27	Vancouver	6–8	Pittsburgh		Demko	18,465	12–10–4	28
27	November 30	Vancouver	5–2	Edmonton		Markstrom	18,035	13–10–4	30

December: 8–5–0 (Home: 7–3–0; Road: 1–2–0)
#	Date	Visitor	Score	Home	OT	Decision	Attendance	Record	Pts	Recap
28	December 1	Edmonton	3–2	Vancouver		Markstrom	18,871	13–11–4	30
29	December 3	Ottawa	2–5	Vancouver		Demko	18,559	14–11–4	32
30	December 7	Buffalo	5–6	Vancouver	OT	Demko	18,871	15–11–4	34
31	December 10	Toronto	4–1	Vancouver		Markstrom	18,290	15–12–4	34
32	December 12	Carolina	0–1	Vancouver	OT	Markstrom	18,626	16–12–4	36
33	December 14	Vancouver	2–4	San Jose		Markstrom	16,242	16–13–4	36
34	December 15	Vancouver	3–6	Vegas		Markstrom	18,066	16–14–4	36
35	December 17	Montreal	3–1	Vancouver		Markstrom	18,788	16–15–4	36
36	December 19	Vegas	4–5	Vancouver	OT	Markstrom	18,871	17–15–4	38
37	December 21	Pittsburgh	1–4	Vancouver		Markstrom	18,285	18–15–4	40
38	December 23	Edmonton	2–4	Vancouver		Markstrom	18,851	19–15–4	42
39	December 28	Los Angeles	2–3	Vancouver		Markstrom	18,837	20–15–4	44
40	December 29	Vancouver	5–2	Calgary		Demko	19,289	21–15–4	46

January: 8–3–0 (Home: 5–0–0; Road: 3–3–0)
#	Date	Visitor	Score	Home	OT	Decision	Attendance	Record	Pts	Recap
41	January 2	Chicago	5–7	Vancouver		Markstrom	18,871	22–15–4	48
42	January 4	NY Rangers	1–2	Vancouver		Markstrom	18,871	23–15–4	50
43	January 7	Vancouver	2–9	Tampa Bay		Markstrom	19,092	23–16–4	50
44	January 9	Vancouver	2–5	Florida		Demko	12,648	23–17–4	50
45	January 11	Vancouver	6–3	Buffalo		Markstrom	18,509	24–17–4	52
46	January 12	Vancouver	4–1	Minnesota		Markstrom	17,348	25–17–4	54
47	January 14	Vancouver	0–4	Winnipeg		Markstrom	15,325	25–18–4	54
48	January 16	Arizona	1–3	Vancouver		Markstrom	18,871	26–18–4	56
49	January 18	San Jose	1–4	Vancouver		Demko	18,786	27–18–4	58
50	January 27	St. Louis	1–3	Vancouver		Demko	18,871	28–18–4	60
51	January 29	Vancouver	5–2	San Jose		Markstrom	16,024	29–18–4	62

February: 5–6–2 (Home: 3–2–1; Road: 2–4–1)
#	Date	Visitor	Score	Home	OT	Decision	Attendance	Record	Pts	Recap
52	February 1	Vancouver	4–3	NY Islanders	OT	Markstrom	14,862	30–18–4	64
53	February 2	Vancouver	3–4	Carolina	SO	Demko	15,767	30–18–5	65
54	February 4	Vancouver	0–4	Boston		Markstrom	17,850	30–19–5	65
55	February 6	Vancouver	2–4	Minnesota		Markstrom	17,191	30–20–5	65
56	February 8	Calgary	6–2	Vancouver		Markstrom	18,871	30–21–5	65
57	February 10	Nashville	2–6	Vancouver		Markstrom	18,871	31–21–5	67
58	February 12	Chicago	0–3	Vancouver		Markstrom	18,871	32–21–5	69
59	February 16	Anaheim	5–1	Vancouver		Demko	18,871	32–22–5	69
60	February 19	Minnesota	4–3	Vancouver	SO	Markstrom	18,871	32–22–6	70
61	February 22	Boston	3–9	Vancouver		Markstrom	18,871	33–22–6	72
62	February 25	Vancouver	4–3	Montreal	OT	Demko	21,187	34–22–6	74
63	February 27	Vancouver	2–5	Ottawa		Demko	12,166	34–23–6	74
64	February 29	Vancouver	2–4	Toronto		Demko	19,371	34–24–6	74

March: 2–3–0 (Home: 2–2–0; Road: 0–1–0)
#	Date	Visitor	Score	Home	OT	Decision	Attendance	Record	Pts	Recap
65	March 1	Vancouver	3–5	Columbus		Domingue	18,378	34–25–6	74
66	March 4	Arizona	4–2	Vancouver		Demko	17,363	34–26–6	74
67	March 6	Colorado	3–6	Vancouver		Demko	18,871	35–26–6	76
68	March 8	Columbus	2–1	Vancouver		Demko	18,871	35–27–6	76
69	March 10	NY Islanders	4–5	Vancouver	SO	Demko	18,871	36–27–6	78

Cancelled games
#	Date	Visitor	Home
70	March 12	Vancouver	Arizona
71	March 13	Vancouver	Colorado
72	March 15	Winnipeg	Vancouver
73	March 18	Tampa Bay	Vancouver
74	March 20	Vancouver	Anaheim
75	March 21	Vancouver	Los Angeles
76	March 23	Vancouver	Vegas
77	March 25	San Jose	Vancouver
78	March 27	Calgary	Vancouver
79	March 28	Anaheim	Vancouver
80	March 30	Vancouver	Dallas
81	April 2	Vancouver	Arizona
82	April 4	Vegas	Vancouver

Legend: Win (2 points) Loss (0 points) Overtime/shootout loss (1 point)

=== Playoffs ===
The Canucks defeated the Minnesota Wild in the qualifying round in four games.

The Canucks faced the St. Louis Blues in the first round, and defeated them in six games.

In the second round, the Canucks faced the Vegas Golden Knights, but lost in seven games.

2020 Stanley Cup playoffs

Western Conference Qualifying Round vs. (10) Minnesota Wild: Vancouver won 3–1
#	Date	Visitor	Score	Home	OT	Decision	Series	Recap
1	August 2	Minnesota	3–0	Vancouver		Markstrom	0–1
2	August 4	Minnesota	3–4	Vancouver		Markstrom	1–1
3	August 6	Vancouver	3–0	Minnesota		Markstrom	2–1
4	August 7	Vancouver	5–4	Minnesota	OT	Markstrom	3–1

Western Conference First Round vs. (4) St. Louis Blues: Vancouver won 4–2
#	Date	Visitor	Score	Home	OT	Decision	Series	Recap
1	August 12	Vancouver	5–2	St. Louis		Markstrom	1–0
2	August 14	Vancouver	4–3	St. Louis	OT	Markstrom	2–0
3	August 16	St. Louis	3–2	Vancouver	OT	Markstrom	2–1
4	August 17	St. Louis	3–1	Vancouver		Markstrom	2–2
5	August 19	Vancouver	4–3	St. Louis		Markstrom	3–2
6	August 21	St. Louis	2–6	Vancouver		Markstrom	4–2

Western Conference Second Round vs. (1) Vegas Golden Knights: Vegas won 4–3
#	Date	Visitor	Score	Home	OT	Decision	Series	Recap
1	August 23	Vancouver	0–5	Vegas		Markstrom	0–1
2	August 25	Vancouver	5–2	Vegas		Markstrom	1–1
3	August 29	Vegas	3–0	Vancouver		Markstrom	1–2
4	August 30	Vegas	5–3	Vancouver		Markstrom	1–3
5	September 1	Vancouver	2–1	Vegas		Demko	2–3
6	September 3	Vegas	0–4	Vancouver		Demko	3–3
7	September 4	Vancouver	0–3	Vegas		Demko	3–4

Legend: Win Loss

=== Detailed records ===
Western Conference
Opponent	Home	Away	Total	Pts	GF	GA
Central Division
Chicago Blackhawks	2–0–0	0–1–0	2–1–0	4	12	10
Colorado Avalanche	1–0–1	0–0–0	1–0–1	3	10	8
Dallas Stars	0–1–0	0–1–0	0–2–0	0	3	10
Minnesota Wild	0–0–1	1–1–0	1–1–1	3	9	9
Nashville Predators	2–0–0	1–0–0	3–0–0	6	17	8
St. Louis Blues	1–0–1	1–0–0	2–0–1	5	8	6
Winnipeg Jets	0–0–0	0–2–0	0–2–0	0	1	8
Total	6–1–3	3–5–0	9–6–3	21	60	59
Pacific Division
Anaheim Ducks	0–1–0	0–0–1	0–1–1	1	2	7
Arizona Coyotes	1–1–0	0–0–0	1–1–0	2	5	5
Calgary Flames	0–1–0	1–1–0	1–2–0	2	7	11
Edmonton Oilers	1–1–0	1–1–0	2–2–0	4	13	10
Los Angeles Kings	2–0–0	1–0–0	3–0–0	6	16	7
San Jose Sharks	1–0–0	2–1–0	3–1–0	6	16	9
Vancouver Canucks	—	—	—	—	—	—
Vegas Golden Knights	1–0–0	0–1–0	1–1–0	2	8	10
Total	6–4–0	5–4–1	11–8–1	23	67	59

Eastern Conference
Opponent	Home	Away	Total	Pts	GF	GA
Atlantic Division
Boston Bruins	1–0–0	0–1–0	1–1–0	2	9	7
Buffalo Sabres	1–0–0	1–0–0	2–0–0	4	12	8
Detroit Red Wings	1–0–0	1–0–0	2–0–0	4	10	3
Florida Panthers	1–0–0	0–1–0	1–1–0	2	9	7
Montreal Canadiens	0–1–0	1–0–0	1–1–0	2	5	6
Ottawa Senators	1–0–0	0–1–0	1–1–0	2	7	7
Tampa Bay Lightning	0–0–0	0–1–0	0–1–0	0	2	9
Toronto Maple Leafs	0–1–0	0–1–0	0–2–0	0	3	8
Total	5–2–0	3–5–0	8–7–0	16	57	55
Metropolitan Division
Carolina Hurricanes	1–0–0	0–0–1	1–0–1	3	4	4
Columbus Blue Jackets	0–1–0	0–1–0	0–2–0	0	4	7
New Jersey Devils	0–1–0	0–1–0	0–2–0	0	1	3
New York Islanders	1–0–0	1–0–0	2–0–0	4	9	7
New York Rangers	1–0–0	1–0–0	2–0–0	4	5	3
Philadelphia Flyers	1–0–0	0–1–0	1–1–0	2	4	4
Pittsburgh Penguins	1–0–0	0–1–0	1–1–0	2	10	9
Washington Capitals	0–0–1	1–0–0	1–0–1	3	7	7
Total	5–2–1	3–4–1	8–6–2	18	44	44

== Player statistics ==
=== Skaters ===
Regular season
Player	GP	G	A	Pts	+/−	PIM
J. T. Miller	69	27	45	72	11	47
Elias Pettersson	68	27	39	66	16	18
Bo Horvat	69	22	31	53	−15	21
Quinn Hughes	68	8	45	53	−10	22
Tanner Pearson	69	21	24	45	−4	27
Brock Boeser	57	16	29	45	4	14
Jake Virtanen	69	18	18	36	−4	41
Adam Gaudette	59	12	21	33	−7	37
Alexander Edler	59	5	28	33	13	62
Tyler Myers	68	6	15	21	−7	49
Christopher Tanev	69	2	18	20	4	41
Josh Leivo	36	7	12	19	0	4
Brandon Sutter	44	8	9	17	1	25
Troy Stecher	69	5	12	17	10	32
Antoine Roussel	41	7	6	13	0	43
Loui Eriksson	49	6	7	13	−2	12
Tyler Toffoli^{†}	10	6	4	10	3	4
Tyler Motte	34	4	4	8	−10	10
Jay Beagle	55	2	6	8	−9	38
Jordie Benn	44	1	6	7	−7	17
Tim Schaller^{‡}	51	5	1	6	−13	14
Zack MacEwen	17	5	1	6	6	20
Oscar Fantenberg	36	1	5	6	−10	6
Micheal Ferland	14	1	4	5	−3	7
Tyler Graovac	8	2	0	2	−2	2
Sven Baertschi	6	0	2	2	−2	4
Nikolay Goldobin	1	0	0	0	0	0
Ashton Sautner	1	0	0	0	0	0
Justin Bailey	2	0	0	0	0	0

Playoffs
Player	GP	G	A	Pts	+/−	PIM
Elias Pettersson	17	7	11	18	2	2
J. T. Miller	17	6	12	18	3	14
Quinn Hughes	17	2	14	16	−2	2
Bo Horvat	17	10	2	12	0	4
Brock Boeser	17	4	7	11	−1	10
Tanner Pearson	17	4	4	8	−4	4
Christopher Tanev	17	1	6	7	1	4
Alexander Edler	17	0	7	7	5	20
Brandon Sutter	17	1	5	6	−2	4
Tyler Motte	17	4	1	5	0	2
Tyler Toffoli	7	2	2	4	−4	0
Antoine Roussel	17	2	2	4	0	46
Troy Stecher	17	2	1	3	9	10
Jake Virtanen	16	2	1	3	2	25
Jay Beagle	17	1	1	2	2	10
Tyler Myers	10	0	0	0	−5	24
Loui Eriksson	10	0	0	0	0	6
Zack MacEwen	6	0	0	0	1	9
Oscar Fantenberg	16	0	0	0	−3	4
Adam Gaudette	10	0	0	0	−1	2
Jordie Benn	7	0	0	0	1	0
Olli Juolevi	1	0	0	0	0	0
Micheal Ferland	2	0	0	0	0	7

=== Goaltenders ===
Regular season
Player	GP	GS	TOI	W	L	OT	GA	GAA	SA	SV%	SO	G	A	PIM
Jacob Markstrom	43	43	2,551:53	23	16	4	117	2.75	1,420	.918	2	0	1	4
Thatcher Demko	27	25	1,529:03	13	10	2	78	3.06	822	.905	0	0	0	0
Louis Domingue^{†}	1	1	58:47	0	1	0	4	4.08	34	.882	0	0	0	0
Michael DiPietro	1	0	8:23	0	0	0	1	7.16	7	.857	0	0	0	0

Playoffs
Player	GP	GS	TOI	W	L	GA	GAA	SA	SV%	SO	G	A	PIM
Jacob Markstrom	14	14	841:11	8	6	40	2.85	491	.919	1	0	0	0
Thatcher Demko	4	3	186:19	2	1	2	0.64	130	.985	1	0	0	0

^{†}Denotes player spent time with another team before joining the Canucks. Stats reflect time with the Canucks only.
^{‡}Denotes player was traded mid-season. Stats reflect time with the Canucks only.
Bold/italics denotes franchise record.

== Awards and honours ==
=== Awards ===
Regular season
Player	Award	Awarded
Elias Pettersson	NHL First Star of the Week	November 4, 2019
Elias Pettersson	NHL All-Star game selection	December 30, 2019
Jacob Markstrom	NHL All-Star game selection	January 3, 2020
Quinn Hughes	NHL All-Star game selection	January 11, 2020
J. T. Miller	NHL Third Star of the Week	February 3, 2020

=== Milestones ===
Regular season
Player	Milestone	Reached
Quinn Hughes	1st career NHL goal	October 9, 2019
Christopher Tanev	100th career NHL point	October 12, 2019
Bo Horvat	100th career NHL goal	October 20, 2019
Bo Horvat	1st career NHL hat-trick	October 22, 2019
J. T. Miller	100th career NHL goal	October 28, 2019
Tanner Pearson	400th career NHL game	October 30, 2019
Brandon Sutter	700th career NHL game	November 8, 2019
Bo Horvat	400th career NHL game	November 21, 2019
Jordie Benn	500th career NHL game	November 30, 2019
Elias Pettersson	100th career NHL game	December 3, 2019
Zack MacEwen	1st career NHL goal	December 3, 2019
Elias Pettersson	100th career NHL point	December 12, 2019
Antoine Roussel	100th career NHL assist	December 21, 2019
Tyler Myers	200th career NHL assist	December 21, 2019
Oscar Fantenberg	100th career NHL game	December 28, 2019
Jacob Markstrom	100th career NHL win	December 28, 2019
Tanner Pearson	100th career NHL assist 200th career NHL point	January 2, 2020
Tanner Pearson	100th career NHL goal	January 16, 2020
Adam Gaudette	100th career NHL game	January 18, 2020
Antoine Roussel	500th career NHL game	January 27, 2020
Christopher Tanev	500th career NHL game	February 6, 2020

Playoffs
Player	Milestone	Reached
Brock Boeser	1st NHL playoff game	August 2, 2020
Adam Gaudette	1st NHL playoff game	August 2, 2020
Quinn Hughes	1st NHL playoff game	August 2, 2020
Jacob Markstrom	1st NHL playoff game	August 2, 2020
Tyler Motte	1st NHL playoff game	August 2, 2020
Elias Pettersson	1st NHL playoff game	August 2, 2020
Troy Stecher	1st NHL playoff game	August 2, 2020
Jake Virtanen	1st NHL playoff game	August 4, 2020
Brock Boeser	1st NHL playoff goal 1st NHL playoff point	August 4, 2020
Elias Pettersson	1st NHL playoff assist 1st NHL playoff point	August 4, 2020
Quinn Hughes	1st NHL playoff assist 1st NHL playoff point	August 4, 2020
Jacob Markstrom	1st NHL playoff win	August 4, 2020
Zack MacEwen	1st NHL playoff game	August 6, 2020
Elias Pettersson	1st NHL playoff goal	August 6, 2020
Brock Boeser	1st NHL playoff assist	August 6, 2020
Jacob Markstrom	1st NHL playoff shutout	August 6, 2020
Quinn Hughes	1st NHL playoff goal	August 7, 2020
Christopher Tanev	1st NHL playoff goal	August 7, 2020
Olli Juolevi	1st NHL playoff game	August 7, 2020
Troy Stecher	1st NHL playoff goal 1st NHL playoff point	August 12, 2020
Tyler Motte	1st NHL playoff goal 1st NHL playoff point	August 19, 2020
Jake Virtanen	1st NHL playoff assist 1st NHL playoff goal 1st NHL playoff point	August 19, 2020
Troy Stecher	1st NHL playoff assist	August 19, 2020
Thatcher Demko	1st NHL playoff game	August 23, 2020
Thatcher Demko	1st NHL playoff win	September 1, 2020
Tyler Motte	1st NHL playoff assist	September 3, 2020
Thatcher Demko	1st NHL playoff shutout	September 3, 2020

=== Records ===
Player	Record	Date
Alexander Edler	Most assists by Canucks defenceman	January 16, 2020

== Transactions ==
The Canucks have been involved in the following transactions during the 2019–20 season.

=== Trades ===
Date	Details		Ref
June 22, 2019	To Tampa Bay Lightning Marek Mazanec; 3rd-round pick in 2019 conditional 1st-round pick in 2020	To Vancouver Canucks J. T. Miller	
June 22, 2019	To Buffalo Sabres 4th-round pick in 2019	To Vancouver Canucks SJS's 4th-round pick in 2019; WPG's 6th-round pick in 2019	
June 22, 2019	To San Jose Sharks Tom Pyatt; 6th-round pick in 2019	To Vancouver Canucks Francis Perron; 7th-round pick in 2019	
October 6, 2019	To Detroit Red Wings Alex Biega	To Vancouver Canucks David Pope	
February 17, 2020	To Los Angeles Kings Tyler Madden; Tim Schaller; 2nd-round pick in 2020; Conditional 4th-round pick in 2022	To Vancouver Canucks Tyler Toffoli	
February 24, 2020	To New Jersey Devils Zane McIntyre	To Vancouver Canucks Louis Domingue	

=== Free agents ===
Date	Player	Team	Contract term	Ref
July 1, 2019	Jordie Benn	from Montreal Canadiens	2-year	
July 1, 2019	Oscar Fantenberg	from Calgary Flames	1-year	
July 1, 2019	Brendan Gaunce	to Boston Bruins	1-year	
July 1, 2019	Markus Granlund	to Edmonton Oilers	1-year	
July 1, 2019	Tyler Graovac	from Calgary Flames	1-year	
July 1, 2019	Tanner Kero	to Dallas Stars	2-year	
July 1, 2019	Zane McIntyre	from Boston Bruins	1-year	
July 1, 2019	Tyler Myers	from Winnipeg Jets	5-year	
July 1, 2019	Derrick Pouliot	to St. Louis Blues	1-year	
July 1, 2019	Luke Schenn	to Tampa Bay Lightning	1-year	
July 4, 2019	Justin Bailey	from Philadelphia Flyers	1-year	
July 10, 2019	Micheal Ferland	from Carolina Hurricanes	4-year	
September 18, 2019	Ben Hutton	to Los Angeles Kings	1-year	
June 18, 2020	Nikolay Goldobin	to CSKA Moscow (KHL)	2-year	
June 23, 2020	Reid Boucher	to Avangard Omsk (KHL)	1-year	

=== Waivers ===
Date	Player	Team	Ref
		from/to	

=== Contract terminations ===
Date	Player	Via	Ref
June 30, 2019	Ryan Spooner	Buyout	

=== Retirement ===
Date	Player	Ref
October 7, 2019	Michael Leighton	

=== Signings ===
Date	Player	Contract term	Ref
July 2, 2019	Tyler Motte	1-year	
July 5, 2019	Josh Leivo	1-year	
July 8, 2019	Francis Perron	1-year	
July 9, 2019	Reid Boucher	1-year	
July 9, 2019	Brogan Rafferty	2-year	
July 9, 2019	Josh Teves	2-year	
August 23, 2019	Arturs Silovs	3-year	
September 4, 2019	Nikolay Goldobin	1-year	
September 16, 2019	Brock Boeser	3-year	
March 19, 2020	William Lockwood	2-year	
March 19, 2020	Marc Michaelis	1-year	
April 29, 2020	Nils Höglander	3-year	
July 14, 2020	Jack Rathbone	3-year	

== Draft picks ==
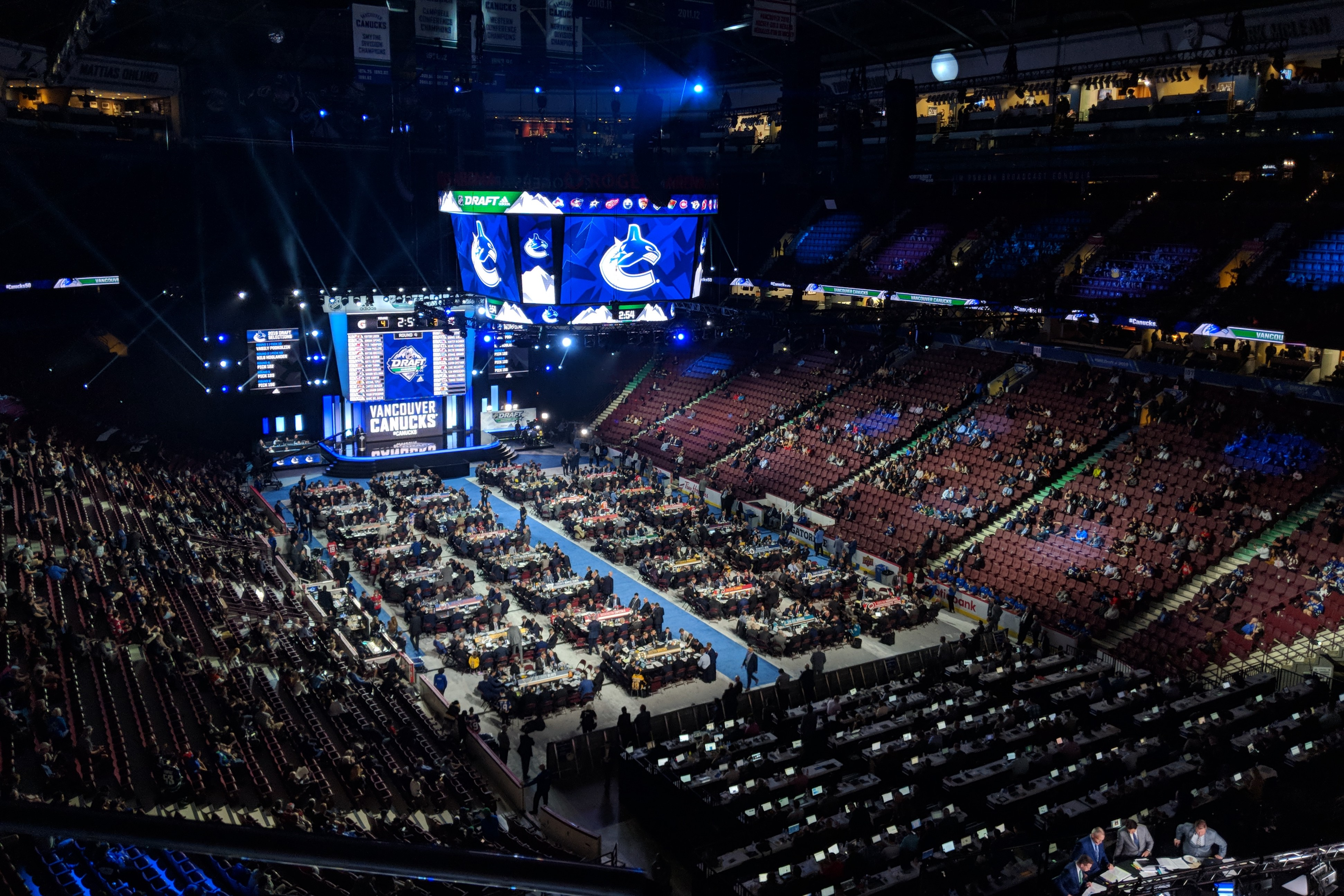
The 2019 NHL entry draft prior to the Vancouver Canucks selecting Ethan Keppen at 122nd overall.

Below are the Vancouver Canucks' selections at the 2019 NHL entry draft, which was held on June 21 and 22, 2019, at Rogers Arena in Vancouver, British Columbia.

Round	#	Player	Pos	Nationality	College/Junior/Club team (League)
1	10	Vasily Podkolzin	RW	Russia	SKA-Neva (VHL)
2	40	Nils Hoglander	LW	Sweden	Rögle BK (SHL)
4	122^{1}	Ethan Keppen	LW	Canada	Flint Firebirds (OHL)
5	133	Carson Focht	C	Canada	Calgary Hitman (WHL)
6	156^{2}	Arturs Silovs	G	Latvia	HK Rīga (MHL)
6	175^{3}	Karel Plasek	RW	Czech Republic	Kometa Brno (ELH)
6	180^{4}	Jack Malone	RW	United States	Youngstown Phantoms (USHL)
7	195	Aidan McDonough	LW	United States	Cedar Rapids RoughRiders (USHL)
7	215^{5}	Arvid Costmar	C	Sweden	Linköpings J20 (J20 SuperElit)

Notes:

1. The San Jose Sharks' fourth-round pick went to the Vancouver Canucks as the result of a trade on June 22, 2019, that sent a fourth-round pick in 2019 (102nd overall) to Buffalo in exchange for Winnipeg's sixth-round pick in 2019 (175th overall) and this pick.
2. The Ottawa Senators' sixth-round pick went to the Vancouver Canucks as the result of a trade on January 2, 2019, that sent Anders Nilsson and Darren Archibald to Ottawa in exchange for Mike McKenna, Tom Pyatt and this pick.
3. The Winnipeg Jets' sixth-round pick went to the Vancouver Canucks as the result of a trade on June 22, 2019, that sent a fourth-round pick in 2019 (102nd overall) to Buffalo in exchange for San Jose's fourth-round pick in 2019 (122nd overall) and this pick.
4. The Washington Capitals' sixth-round pick went to the Vancouver Canucks as the result of a trade on June 23, 2018, that sent a sixth-round pick in 2018 to Washington in exchange for a sixth-round pick in 2018 and this pick.
5. The San Jose Sharks' seventh-round pick went to the Vancouver Canucks as the result of a trade on June 22, 2019, that sent Tom Pyatt and a sixth-round pick in 2019 (164th overall) to San Jose in exchange for Francis Perron and this pick.
