= 2019–20 Dallas Stars season =

National Hockey League team season

2019–20 Dallas Stars
- Western Conference champions
- Division: 3rd Central
- Conference: 4th Western
- 2019–20 record: 37–24–8
- Home record: 19–12–3
- Road record: 18–12–5
- Goals for: 180
- Goals against: 177

Team information
- General manager: Jim Nill
- Coach: Jim Montgomery (Oct. 3 – Dec. 10); Rick Bowness (interim, Dec. 10 – Sept. 28)
- Captain: Jamie Benn
- Alternate captains: Blake Comeau (Feb.–Sep.); John Klingberg; Esa Lindell (Feb.–Sep.); Alexander Radulov (Oct.–Feb.); Tyler Seguin
- Arena: American Airlines Center
- Average attendance: 20,326
- Minor league affiliates: Texas Stars (AHL); Idaho Steelheads (ECHL)

Team leaders
- Goals: Denis Gurianov (20)
- Assists: Tyler Seguin (33)
- Points: Tyler Seguin (50)
- Penalty minutes: Corey Perry (70)
- Plus/minus: Miro Heiskanen (+14)
- Wins: Ben Bishop (21)
- Goals against average: Anton Khudobin (2.22)

The 2019–20 Dallas Stars season was the 53rd season for the National Hockey League (NHL) franchise that was established on June 5, 1967, and 27th season since the franchise relocated from Minnesota prior to the start of the 1993–94 NHL season. The Stars advanced to the playoffs for consecutive seasons for the first time since 2007–08.

On December 10, 2019, Jim Montgomery was dismissed and replaced by Rick Bowness.

The season was suspended by the league officials on March 12, 2020, after several other professional and collegiate sports organizations followed suit as a result of the ongoing COVID-19 pandemic. On May 26, the NHL regular season was officially declared over with the remaining games being cancelled. The NHL officially resumed play in two controlled locations in August 2020, with Western Conference teams, including Dallas, playing in Edmonton and Eastern Conference teams in Toronto. The Stars advanced to the playoffs and played in a round-robin tournament, which determined the team's seed for the playoffs; Dallas was ultimately seeded third, entering them into a first-round series against the Calgary Flames, which they won in six games. The Stars then faced the Colorado Avalanche in the second round, defeating them in seven games. In the Western Conference Final, the Stars defeated the Vegas Golden Knights in five games to advance to the Stanley Cup Finals for the first time in 20 years. They were ultimately defeated in six games by the Tampa Bay Lightning.

== Standings ==
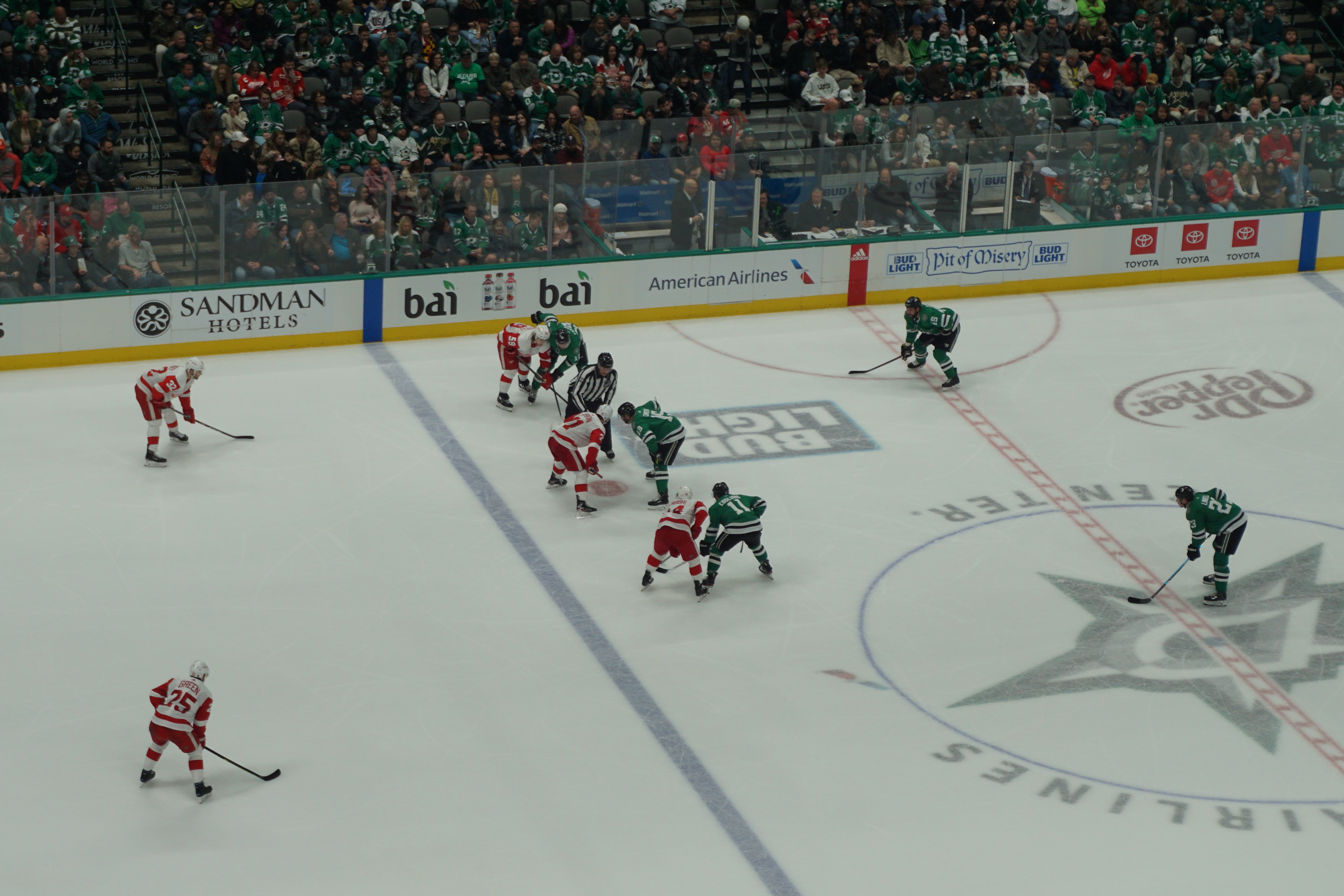
Dallas in action against Detroit on January 3, 2020

=== Divisional standings ===
Central Division
Pos	Team	GP	W	L	OTL	RW	GF	GA	GD	Pts
1	St. Louis Blues	71	42	19	10	33	225	193	+32	94
2	Colorado Avalanche	70	42	20	8	37	237	191	+46	92
3	Dallas Stars	69	37	24	8	26	180	177	+3	82
4	Winnipeg Jets	71	37	28	6	30	216	203	+13	80
5	Nashville Predators	69	35	26	8	28	215	217	−2	78
6	Minnesota Wild	69	35	27	7	30	220	220	0	77
7	Chicago Blackhawks	70	32	30	8	23	212	218	−6	72

Source: National Hockey League

=== Western Conference ===
Pos	Team	GP	W	L	OTL	RW	GF	GA	GD	PCT	Qualification
1	St. Louis Blues	71	42	19	10	33	225	193	+32	.662	Advance to Seeding round-robin tournament
2	Colorado Avalanche	70	42	20	8	37	237	191	+46	.657	Advance to Seeding round-robin tournament
3	Vegas Golden Knights	71	39	24	8	30	227	211	+16	.606	Advance to Seeding round-robin tournament
4	Dallas Stars	69	37	24	8	26	180	177	+3	.594	Advance to Seeding round-robin tournament
5	Edmonton Oilers	71	37	25	9	31	225	217	+8	.585	Advance to 2020 Stanley Cup playoffs qualifying round
6	Nashville Predators	69	35	26	8	28	215	217	−2	.565	Advance to 2020 Stanley Cup playoffs qualifying round
7	Vancouver Canucks	69	36	27	6	27	228	217	+11	.565	Advance to 2020 Stanley Cup playoffs qualifying round
8	Calgary Flames	70	36	27	7	25	210	215	−5	.564	Advance to 2020 Stanley Cup playoffs qualifying round
9	Winnipeg Jets	71	37	28	6	30	216	203	+13	.563	Advance to 2020 Stanley Cup playoffs qualifying round
10	Minnesota Wild	69	35	27	7	30	220	220	0	.558	Advance to 2020 Stanley Cup playoffs qualifying round
11	Arizona Coyotes	70	33	29	8	26	195	187	+8	.529	Advance to 2020 Stanley Cup playoffs qualifying round
12	Chicago Blackhawks	70	32	30	8	23	212	218	−6	.514	Advance to 2020 Stanley Cup playoffs qualifying round
13	Anaheim Ducks	71	29	33	9	20	187	226	−39	.472	
14	Los Angeles Kings	70	29	35	6	21	178	212	−34	.457	
15	San Jose Sharks	70	29	36	5	22	182	226	−44	.450	

Source: National Hockey League

Tiebreaking procedures

1. Fewer number of games played (only used during regular season).
2. Greater number of regulation wins (denoted by RW).
3. Greater number of wins in regulation and overtime (excluding shootout wins; denoted by ROW).
4. Greater number of total wins (including shootouts).
5. Greater number of points earned in head-to-head play; if teams played an uneven number of head-to-head games, the result of the first game on the home ice of the team with the extra home game is discarded.
6. Greater goal differential (difference between goals for and goals against).
7. Greater number of goals scored (denoted by GF).

== Schedule and results ==
=== Preseason ===
The pre-season schedule was published on June 13, 2019.

2019 preseason game log: 4–3–0 (Home: 1–3–0; Road: 3–0–0)
#	Date	Visitor	Score	Home	OT	Decision	Attendance	Record	Recap
1	September 16	St. Louis	2–0	Dallas		Bishop	13,214	0–1–0
2	September 17	Dallas	2–1	Minnesota	OT	Point	13,537	1–1–0
3	September 19	Dallas	2–1	Colorado		Bow	—	2–1–0
4 ^{[a]}	September 21	Florida	6–0	Dallas		Bishop	—	2–2–0
5	September 24	Dallas	2–1	St. Louis		Bow	16,515	3–2–0
6	September 26	Minnesota	2–1	Dallas		Khudobin	12,036	3–3–0
7	September 28	Colorado	3–4	Dallas	SO	Bishop	13,112	4–3–0
Notes:^{a} Game was played at BOK Center in Tulsa, Oklahoma.

=== Regular season ===
The NHL regular season schedule was released on June 25, 2019. The Stars hosted the 2020 NHL Winter Classic against the Nashville Predators, the first outdoor game for both teams, winning by a final score of 4–2.

2019–20 game log

October: 5–8–1 (Home: 3–3–1; Road: 2–5–0)
#	Date	Visitor	Score	Home	OT	Decision	Attendance	Record	Pts	Recap
1	October 3	Boston	2–1	Dallas		Bishop	18,532	0–1–0	0
2	October 5	Dallas	2–3	St. Louis		Bishop	18,096	0–2–0	0
3	October 6	Dallas	3–4	Detroit		Khudobin	19,515	0–3–0	0
4	October 8	Dallas	4–3	Washington	OT	Bishop	18,573	1–3–0	2
5	October 10	Calgary	3–2	Dallas	SO	Bishop	17,989	1–3–1	3
6	October 12	Washington	4–1	Dallas		Khudobin	18,532	1–4–1	3
7	October 14	Dallas	0–4	Buffalo		Bishop	16,595	1–5–1	3
8	October 16	Dallas	2–3	Columbus		Bishop	14,683	1–6–1	3
9	October 18	Dallas	2–4	Pittsburgh		Khudobin	18,482	1–7–1	3
10	October 19	Dallas	4–1	Philadelphia		Bishop	18,003	2–7–1	5
11	October 21	Ottawa	1–2	Dallas		Khudobin	17,896	3–7–1	7
12	October 24	Anaheim	1–2	Dallas		Bishop	17,754	4–7–1	9
13	October 26	Pittsburgh	3–0	Dallas		Bishop	18,532	4–8–1	9
14	October 29	Minnesota	3–6	Dallas		Khudobin	17,756	5–8–1	11

November: 10–2–1 (Home: 6–1–0; Road: 4–1–1)
#	Date	Visitor	Score	Home	OT	Decision	Attendance	Record	Pts	Recap
15	November 1	Dallas	2–1	Colorado		Khudobin	18,020	6–8–1	13
16	November 2	Montreal	1–4	Dallas		Bishop	18,532	7–8–1	15
17	November 5	Colorado	1–4	Dallas		Bishop	18,108	8–8–1	17
18	November 10	Dallas	2–3	Winnipeg	OT	Khudobin	15,323	8–8–2	18
19	November 13	Dallas	3–1	Calgary		Bishop	18,257	9–8–2	20
20	November 14	Dallas	4–2	Vancouver		Khudobin	18,642	10–8–2	22
21	November 16	Dallas	5–4	Edmonton	OT	Khudobin	17,346	11–8–2	24
22	November 19	Vancouver	1–6	Dallas		Bishop	18,198	12–8–2	26
23	November 21	Winnipeg	3–5	Dallas		Bishop	18,133	13–8–2	28
24	November 23	Chicago	1–2	Dallas	SO	Khudobin	18,532	14–8–2	30
25	November 25	Vegas	2–4	Dallas		Bishop	18,532	15–8–2	32
26	November 26	Dallas	0–3	Chicago		Khudobin	21,210	15–9–2	32
27	November 29	St. Louis	3–1	Dallas		Bishop	18,532	15–10–2	32

December: 7–4–2 (Home: 4–2–1; Road: 3–2–1)
#	Date	Visitor	Score	Home	OT	Decision	Attendance	Record	Pts	Recap
28	December 1	Dallas	2–3	Minnesota	SO	Bishop	17,096	15–10–3	33
29	December 3	Dallas	1–5	Winnipeg		Khudobin	15,325	15–11–3	33
30	December 5	Winnipeg	2–3	Dallas	OT	Bishop	17,983	16–11–3	35
31	December 7	NY Islanders	1–3	Dallas		Bishop	18,532	17–11–3	37
32	December 10	New Jersey	0–2	Dallas		Bishop	18,134	18–11–3	39
33	December 13	Vegas	3–2	Dallas	OT	Bishop	18,532	18–11–4	40
34	December 14	Dallas	4–1	Nashville		Khudobin	17,586	19–11–4	42
35	December 16	Edmonton	2–1	Dallas		Bishop	18,096	19–12–4	42
36	December 19	Dallas	4–3	Tampa Bay	OT	Khudobin	19,092	20–12–4	44
37	December 20	Dallas	4–7	Florida		Bishop	14,040	20–13–4	44
38	December 22	Calgary	5–1	Dallas		Bishop	18,532	20–14–4	44
39	December 28	Colorado	2–3	Dallas	SO	Bishop	18,532	21–14–4	46
40	December 29	Dallas	4–2	Arizona		Khudobin	17,125	22–14–4	48

January: 6–4–0 (Home: 3–2–0; Road: 3–2–0)
#	Date	Visitor	Score	Home	OT	Decision	Attendance	Record	Pts	Recap
41	January 1	Nashville	2–4	Dallas		Bishop	85,630 (outdoors)	23–14–4	50
42	January 3	Detroit	1–4	Dallas		Khudobin	18,532	24–14–4	52
43	January 8	Dallas	2–1	Los Angeles		Khudobin	17,129	25–14–4	54
44	January 9	Dallas	3–0	Anaheim		Bishop	15,419	26–14–4	56
45	January 11	Dallas	1–2	San Jose		Khudobin	17,562	26–15–4	56
46	January 14	Dallas	3–2	Colorado	OT	Bishop	18,015	27–15–4	58
47	January 16	Buffalo	4–1	Dallas		Bishop	18,532	27–16–4	58
48	January 18	Dallas	0–7	Minnesota		Khudobin	18,219	27–17–4	58
49	January 27	Tampa Bay	2–3	Dallas	OT	Bishop	18,345	28–17–4	60
50	January 29	Toronto	5–3	Dallas		Bishop	18,532	28–18–4	60

February: 9–3–3 (Home: 3–2–0; Road: 6–1–3)
#	Date	Visitor	Score	Home	OT	Decision	Attendance	Record	Pts	Recap
51	February 1	Dallas	3–2	New Jersey	OT	Bishop	16,514	29–18–4	62
52	February 3	Dallas	5–3	NY Rangers		Khudobin	15,779	30–18–4	64
53	February 4	Dallas	3–4	NY Islanders	OT	Bishop	10,128	30–18–5	65
54	February 7	Minnesota	3–2	Dallas		Bishop	18,532	30–19–5	65
55	February 8	Dallas	3–2	St. Louis	OT	Khudobin	18,096	31–19–5	67
56	February 11	Carolina	1–4	Dallas		Khudobin	18,532	32–19–5	69
57	February 13	Dallas	3–2	Toronto		Bishop	19,107	33–19–5	71
58	February 15	Dallas	4–3	Montreal	OT	Bishop	21,302	34–19–5	73
59	February 16	Dallas	3–4	Ottawa	OT	Khudobin	13,150	34–19–6	74
60	February 19	Arizona	2–3	Dallas		Bishop	18,227	35–19–6	76
61	February 21	St. Louis	5–1	Dallas		Bishop	18,532	35–20–6	76
62	February 23	Chicago	1–2	Dallas		Khudobin	18,532	36–20–6	78
63	February 25	Dallas	4–1	Carolina		Khudobin	18,176	37–20–6	80
64	February 27	Dallas	3–4	Boston		Bishop	17,850	37–21–6	80
65	February 29	Dallas	3–4	St. Louis	SO	Khudobin	18,096	37–21–7	81

March: 0–3–1 (Home: 0–2–1; Road: 0–1–0)
#	Date	Visitor	Score	Home	OT	Decision	Attendance	Record	Pts	Recap
66	March 3	Edmonton	2–1	Dallas	OT	Khudobin	18,532	37–21–8	82
67	March 5	Dallas	0–2	Nashville		Khudobin	17,349	37–22–8	82
68	March 7	Nashville	1–0	Dallas		Bishop	18,532	37–23–8	82
69	March 10	NY Rangers	4–2	Dallas		Bishop	18,195	37–24–8	82

Cancelled games
#	Date	Visitor	Home
70	March 12	Florida	Dallas
71	March 14	San Jose	Dallas
72	March 16	Dallas	Arizona
73	March 17	Dallas	Vegas
74	March 20	Philadelphia	Dallas
75	March 22	Winnipeg	Dallas
76	March 24	Los Angeles	Dallas
77	March 27	Dallas	Chicago
78	March 28	Columbus	Dallas
79	March 30	Vancouver	Dallas
80	April 1	Dallas	Anaheim
81	April 2	Dallas	San Jose
82	April 4	Dallas	Los Angeles

Legend: Win (2 points) Loss (0 points) Overtime/shootout loss (1 point)

=== Playoffs ===
The Stars played in a round-robin tournament to determine their seed in the Western conference. Dallas finished with a 1–2–0 record, earning the third seed in the conference.

The Stars defeated the Calgary Flames in the first round in six games.

In the second round, the Stars faced the Colorado Avalanche, defeating them in seven games.

The Stars faced the Vegas Golden Knights in the Conference Final, and defeated them in five games.

The Stars faced the Tampa Bay Lightning in the Stanley Cup Finals, where they were defeated in six games.

2020 Stanley Cup playoffs

Western Conference Seeding Round-robin
#	Date	Visitor	Score	Home	OT	Decision	Record	Points	Recap
1	August 3	Dallas	3–5	Vegas		Bishop	0–1–0	0
2	August 5	Colorado	4–0	Dallas		Khudobin	0–2–0	0
3	August 8	Dallas	2–1	St. Louis	SO	Khudobin	1–2–0	2

Western Conference First Round vs. (6) Calgary Flames: Dallas won 4–2
#	Date	Visitor	Score	Home	OT	Decision	Series	Recap
1	August 11	Calgary	3–2	Dallas		Khudobin	0–1
2	August 13	Calgary	4–5	Dallas		Bishop	1–1
3	August 14	Dallas	0–2	Calgary		Khudobin	1–2
4	August 16	Dallas	5–4	Calgary	OT	Khudobin	2–2
5	August 18	Calgary	1–2	Dallas		Khudobin	3–2
6	August 20	Dallas	7–3	Calgary		Khudobin	4–2

Western Conference Second Round vs. (2) Colorado Avalanche: Dallas won 4–3
#	Date	Visitor	Score	Home	OT	Decision	Series	Recap
1	August 22	Dallas	5–3	Colorado		Khudobin	1–0
2	August 24	Dallas	5–2	Colorado		Khudobin	2–0
3	August 26	Colorado	6–4	Dallas		Khudobin	2–1
4	August 30	Colorado	4–5	Dallas		Khudobin	3–1
5	August 31	Dallas	3–6	Colorado		Bishop	3–2
6	September 2	Colorado	4–1	Dallas		Khudobin	3–3
7	September 4	Dallas	5–4	Colorado	OT	Khudobin	4–3

Western Conference Finals vs. (1) Vegas Golden Knights: Dallas won 4–1
#	Date	Visitor	Score	Home	OT	Decision	Series	Recap
1	September 6	Dallas	1–0	Vegas		Khudobin	1–0
2	September 8	Dallas	0–3	Vegas		Khudobin	1–1
3	September 10	Vegas	2–3	Dallas	OT	Khudobin	2–1
4	September 12	Vegas	1–2	Dallas		Khudobin	3–1
5	September 14	Dallas	3–2	Vegas	OT	Khudobin	4–1

Stanley Cup Finals vs. (E2) Tampa Bay Lightning: Tampa Bay won 4–2
#	Date	Visitor	Score	Home	OT	Decision	Series	Recap
1	September 19	Dallas	4–1	Tampa Bay		Khudobin	1–0
2	September 21	Dallas	2–3	Tampa Bay		Khudobin	1–1
3	September 23	Tampa Bay	5–2	Dallas		Khudobin	1–2
4	September 25	Tampa Bay	5–4	Dallas	OT	Khudobin	1–3
5	September 26	Dallas	3–2	Tampa Bay	2OT	Khudobin	2–3
6	September 28	Tampa Bay	2–0	Dallas		Khudobin	2–4

Legend: Win (2 points) Loss (0 points) Overtime/shootout loss (1 point)

== Player statistics ==
=== Skaters ===
Regular season
Player	GP	G	A	Pts	+/−	PIM
Tyler Seguin	69	17	33	50	−2	22
Jamie Benn	69	19	20	39	−4	53
Miro Heiskanen	68	8	27	35	14	12
Alexander Radulov	60	15	19	34	8	46
Roope Hintz	60	19	14	33	3	16
John Klingberg	58	6	26	32	−10	22
Joe Pavelski	67	14	17	31	6	29
Denis Gurianov	64	20	9	29	5	13
Esa Lindell	69	3	20	23	5	12
Jason Dickinson	65	9	12	21	7	6
Mattias Janmark	62	6	15	21	−5	12
Corey Perry	57	5	16	21	−2	70
Radek Faksa	66	11	9	20	−6	42
Blake Comeau	55	8	8	16	−6	36
Andrew Cogliano	68	3	11	14	2	30
Jamie Oleksiak	69	3	7	10	−6	41
Taylor Fedun	27	2	7	9	3	8
Andrej Sekera	57	2	6	8	9	14
Justin Dowling	29	3	3	6	−3	8
Stephen Johns	17	2	3	5	0	10
Roman Polak	41	0	4	4	−6	24
Nick Caamano	12	1	1	2	2	4
Joel Hanley	8	0	2	2	0	6
Joel L'Esperance	3	1	0	1	0	2
Joel Kiviranta	11	1	0	1	−1	4
Jason Robertson	3	0	1	1	0	0
Rhett Gardner	8	0	0	0	0	2

Playoffs
Player	GP	G	A	Pts	+/−	PIM
Miro Heiskanen	27	6	20	26	8	2
John Klingberg	26	4	17	21	−5	14
Joe Pavelski	27	13	6	19	6	30
Jamie Benn	27	8	11	19	2	32
Alexander Radulov	27	8	10	18	0	24
Denis Gurianov	27	9	8	17	0	2
Tyler Seguin	26	2	11	13	1	12
Roope Hintz	25	2	11	13	−3	10
Jamie Oleksiak	27	5	4	9	11	26
Corey Perry	27	5	4	9	−3	27
Radek Faksa	19	3	5	8	−3	4
Mattias Janmark	26	1	7	8	0	38
Esa Lindell	27	1	7	8	−12	2
Blake Comeau	23	2	5	7	−2	30
Joel Kiviranta	14	5	1	6	7	4
Jason Dickinson	27	2	2	4	−7	8
Joel Hanley	12	1	1	2	3	4
Andrew Cogliano	23	0	2	2	−6	10
Andrej Sekera	27	0	1	1	−1	0
Justin Dowling	2	0	0	0	0	0
Thomas Harley	1	0	0	0	0	0
Stephen Johns	4	0	0	0	−4	0
Taylor Fedun	11	0	0	0	−3	4
Nick Caamano	4	0	0	0	−4	0

=== Goaltenders ===
Regular season
Player	GP	GS	TOI	W	L	OT	GA	GAA	SA	SV%	SO	G	A	PIM
Ben Bishop	44	43	2,473:49	21	16	4	103	2.50	1,286	.920	2	0	2	2
Anton Khudobin	30	26	1,677:29	16	8	4	62	2.22	882	.930	0	0	3	4

Playoffs
Player	GP	GS	TOI	W	L	OT	GA	GAA	SA	SV%	SO	G	A	PIM
Anton Khudobin	25	24	1,492:55	14	10	0	67	2.69	811	.917	1	0	1	2
Ben Bishop	3	3	132:36	1	2	0	12	5.43	77	.844	0	0	1	0
Jake Oettinger	2	0	36:40	0	0	0	0	0.00	8	1.000	0	0	0	0

^{†}Denotes player spent time with another team before joining the Stars. Stats reflect time with the Stars only.
^{‡}Denotes player was traded mid-season. Stats reflect time with the Stars only.
Bold/italics denotes franchise record.

== Transactions ==
The Stars have been involved in the following transactions during the 2019–20 season.

=== Trades ===
Date	Details		Ref
June 24, 2019	To Philadelphia Flyers Tyler Pitlick	To Dallas Stars Ryan Hartman	

=== Free agents ===
Date	Player	Team	Contract term	Ref
July 1, 2019	Ryan Hartman	to Minnesota Wild	2-year	
July 1, 2019	Tanner Kero	from Vancouver Canucks	2-year	
July 1, 2019	Joe Pavelski	from San Jose Sharks	3-year	
July 1, 2019	Corey Perry	from Anaheim Ducks	1-year	
July 1, 2019	Brett Ritchie	to Boston Bruins	1-year	
July 1, 2019	Andrej Sekera	from Edmonton Oilers	1-year	
July 1, 2019	Jason Spezza	to Toronto Maple Leafs	1-year	
July 1, 2019	Mats Zuccarello	to Minnesota Wild	5-year	
July 2, 2019	Philippe Desrosiers	to Florida Panthers	1-year	
July 22, 2019	Erik Condra	to Colorado Eagles (AHL)	1-year	
August 23, 2019	Chris Martenet	to Brampton Beast (ECHL)	1-year	
October 10, 2019	Julius Honka	to JYP Jyväskylä (Liiga)	1-year	

=== Waivers ===
Date	Player	Team	Ref
July 1, 2019		from/to	

=== Contract terminations ===
Date	Player	Via	Ref
June 30, 2019	Valeri Nichushkin	Buyout	

=== Retirement ===
Date	Player	Ref
August 29, 2019	Ben Lovejoy	

=== Signings ===
Date	Player	Contract term	Ref
June 27, 2019	Taylor Fedun	2-year	
July 1, 2019	Reece Scarlett	1-year	
July 1, 2019	Landon Bow	1-year	
July 8, 2019	Gavin Bayreuther	1-year	
July 9, 2019	Dillon Heatherington	1-year	
July 11, 2019	Jason Dickinson	2-year	
September 23, 2019	Thomas Harley	3-year	
September 26, 2019	Dawson Barteaux	3-year	

== Draft picks ==
Below are the Dallas Stars' selections at the 2019 NHL entry draft, which was held on June 21 and 22, 2019, at Rogers Arena in Vancouver, British Columbia.

Round	#	Player	Pos	Nationality	College/Junior/Club team (League)
1	18	Thomas Harley	D	Canada	Mississauga Steelheads (OHL)
4	111	Samuel Sjolund	D	Sweden	AIK IF J20 (J20 SuperElit)
5	142	Nicholas Porco	LW	Canada	Saginaw Spirit (OHL)
6	173	Benjamin Brinkman	D	United States	Minnesota (Big Ten)
