= 2019–20 St. Louis Blues season =

Professional ice hockey team season

2019–20 St. Louis Blues
- Central Division champions
- Division: 1st Central
- Conference: 1st Western
- 2019–20 record: 42–19–10
- Home record: 23–7–5
- Road record: 19–12–5
- Goals for: 225
- Goals against: 193

Team information
- General manager: Doug Armstrong
- Coach: Craig Berube
- Captain: Alex Pietrangelo
- Alternate captains: Ryan O'Reilly (Nov.–Aug.); Alexander Steen; Vladimir Tarasenko
- Arena: Enterprise Center
- Average attendance: 18,096
- Minor league affiliates: San Antonio Rampage (AHL); Tulsa Oilers (ECHL)

Team leaders
- Goals: David Perron; Brayden Schenn (25)
- Assists: Ryan O'Reilly (49)
- Points: Ryan O'Reilly (61)
- Penalty minutes: David Perron (52)
- Plus/minus: Vince Dunn (+15)
- Wins: Jordan Binnington (30)
- Goals against average: Jake Allen (2.15)

The 2019–20 St. Louis Blues season was the 53rd season for the National Hockey League (NHL) franchise that was established on June 5, 1967. The Blues entered the season as the defending Stanley Cup champions for the first time in franchise history.

The season was suspended by the league officials on March 12, 2020, after several other professional and collegiate sports organizations followed suit as a result of the ongoing COVID-19 pandemic. On May 26, the NHL regular season was officially declared over, with the remaining games being cancelled. The Blues advanced to the playoffs and played to play in a round-robin tournament, to determine the team's seed for the playoffs. The Blues faced the Vancouver Canucks in the first round, but were defeated in six games.

== Off-season ==
On June 24, 2019, head coach Craig Berube signed a three-year contract with the Blues. Berube had been the interim head coach since November 2018 and helped the Blues win the Stanley Cup in the previous season.

== Standings ==
=== Divisional standings ===
Central Division
Pos	Team	GP	W	L	OTL	RW	GF	GA	GD	Pts
1	St. Louis Blues	71	42	19	10	33	225	193	+32	94
2	Colorado Avalanche	70	42	20	8	37	237	191	+46	92
3	Dallas Stars	69	37	24	8	26	180	177	+3	82
4	Winnipeg Jets	71	37	28	6	30	216	203	+13	80
5	Nashville Predators	69	35	26	8	28	215	217	−2	78
6	Minnesota Wild	69	35	27	7	30	220	220	0	77
7	Chicago Blackhawks	70	32	30	8	23	212	218	−6	72

Source: National Hockey League

=== Western Conference ===
Pos	Team	GP	W	L	OTL	RW	GF	GA	GD	PCT	Qualification
1	St. Louis Blues	71	42	19	10	33	225	193	+32	.662	Advance to Seeding round-robin tournament
2	Colorado Avalanche	70	42	20	8	37	237	191	+46	.657	Advance to Seeding round-robin tournament
3	Vegas Golden Knights	71	39	24	8	30	227	211	+16	.606	Advance to Seeding round-robin tournament
4	Dallas Stars	69	37	24	8	26	180	177	+3	.594	Advance to Seeding round-robin tournament
5	Edmonton Oilers	71	37	25	9	31	225	217	+8	.585	Advance to 2020 Stanley Cup playoffs qualifying round
6	Nashville Predators	69	35	26	8	28	215	217	−2	.565	Advance to 2020 Stanley Cup playoffs qualifying round
7	Vancouver Canucks	69	36	27	6	27	228	217	+11	.565	Advance to 2020 Stanley Cup playoffs qualifying round
8	Calgary Flames	70	36	27	7	25	210	215	−5	.564	Advance to 2020 Stanley Cup playoffs qualifying round
9	Winnipeg Jets	71	37	28	6	30	216	203	+13	.563	Advance to 2020 Stanley Cup playoffs qualifying round
10	Minnesota Wild	69	35	27	7	30	220	220	0	.558	Advance to 2020 Stanley Cup playoffs qualifying round
11	Arizona Coyotes	70	33	29	8	26	195	187	+8	.529	Advance to 2020 Stanley Cup playoffs qualifying round
12	Chicago Blackhawks	70	32	30	8	23	212	218	−6	.514	Advance to 2020 Stanley Cup playoffs qualifying round
13	Anaheim Ducks	71	29	33	9	20	187	226	−39	.472	
14	Los Angeles Kings	70	29	35	6	21	178	212	−34	.457	
15	San Jose Sharks	70	29	36	5	22	182	226	−44	.450	

Source: National Hockey League

Tiebreaking procedures

1. Fewer number of games played (only used during regular season).
2. Greater number of regulation wins (denoted by RW).
3. Greater number of wins in regulation and overtime (excluding shootout wins; denoted by ROW).
4. Greater number of total wins (including shootouts).
5. Greater number of points earned in head-to-head play; if teams played an uneven number of head-to-head games, the result of the first game on the home ice of the team with the extra home game is discarded.
6. Greater goal differential (difference between goals for and goals against).
7. Greater number of goals scored (denoted by GF).

== Schedule and results ==
=== Preseason ===
The preseason schedule was published on June 18, 2019.

2019 pre-season game log: 4–3–0 (Home: 2–1–0; Road: 2–2–0)
#	Date	Visitor	Score	Home	OT	Decision	Attendance	Record	Recap
1	September 16	St. Louis	2–0	Dallas		Husso	13,214	1–0–0
2	September 18	St. Louis	2–3	Washington		Fitzpatrick	13,415	1–1–0
3	September 20	St. Louis	4–3	Winnipeg	OT	Husso	15,325	2–1–0
4	September 22	Columbus	3–5	St. Louis		Binnington	16,672	3–1–0
5	September 24	Dallas	2–1	St. Louis		Allen	16,515	3–2–0
6 ^{[a]}	September 26	St. Louis	1–4	Detroit		Binnington	—	3–3–0
7	September 27	Washington	3–4	St. Louis		Husso	17,101	4–3–0
8	September 29	St. Louis	–	Columbus	Game cancelled due to a mechanical issue with St. Louis' aircraft.
Notes:^{a} Game was played at Calumet Colosseum in Calumet, Michigan.

=== Regular season ===
The regular season schedule was published on June 25, 2019.

2019–20 game log

October: 7–3–3 (Home: 4–1–2; Road: 3–2–1)
#	Date	Visitor	Score	Home	OT	Decision	Attendance	Record	Pts	Recap
1	October 2	Washington	3–2	St. Louis	OT	Binnington	18,096	0–0–1	1
2	October 5	Dallas	2–3	St. Louis		Binnington	18,096	1–0–1	3
3	October 7	St. Louis	3–2	Toronto		Binnington	19,466	2–0–1	5
4	October 10	St. Louis	6–4	Ottawa		Allen	9,204	3–0–1	7
5	October 12	St. Louis	3–6	Montreal		Binnington	21,302	3–1–1	7
6	October 14	St. Louis	2–3	NY Islanders	OT	Binnington	10,355	3–1–2	8
7	October 17	Vancouver	4–3	St. Louis	SO	Binnington	18,096	3–1–3	9
8	October 19	Montreal	5–2	St. Louis		Allen	18,096	3–2–3	9
9	October 21	Colorado	1–3	St. Louis		Binnington	18,096	4–2–3	11
10	October 24	Los Angeles	2–5	St. Louis		Binnington	18,096	5–2–3	13
11	October 26	St. Louis	0–3	Boston		Binnington	17,193	5–3–3	13
12	October 27	St. Louis	5–4	Detroit	OT	Binnington	18,331	6–3–3	15
13	October 30	Minnesota	1–2	St. Louis		Binnington	18,096	7–3–3	17

November: 10–2–3 (Home: 4–2–1; Road: 6–0–2)
#	Date	Visitor	Score	Home	OT	Decision	Attendance	Record	Pts	Recap
14	November 1	Columbus	3–4	St. Louis	OT	Binnington	18,096	8–3–3	19
15	November 2	St. Louis	4–3	Minnesota	OT	Allen	18,208	9–3–3	21
16	November 5	St. Louis	2–1	Vancouver	OT	Binnington	18,789	10–3–3	23
17	November 6	St. Louis	5–2	Edmonton		Allen	17,068	11–3–3	25
18	November 9	St. Louis	3–2	Calgary	OT	Binnington	19,289	12–3–3	27
19	November 12	Arizona	3–2	St. Louis	SO	Binnington	18,096	12–3–4	28
20	November 15	St. Louis	2–3	Columbus	OT	Allen	18,505	12–3–5	29
21	November 16	Anaheim	4–1	St. Louis		Binnington	18,096	12–4–5	29
22	November 19	Tampa Bay	1–3	St. Louis		Binnington	18,096	13–4–5	31
23	November 21	Calgary	0–5	St. Louis		Binnington	18,096	14–4–5	33
24	November 23	Nashville	4–2	St. Louis		Binnington	18,096	14–5–5	33
25	November 25	St. Louis	2–3	Nashville	SO	Allen	17,168	14–5–6	34
26	November 27	St. Louis	4–3	Tampa Bay		Binnington	19,092	15–5–6	36
27	November 29	St. Louis	3–1	Dallas		Allen	18,532	16–5–6	38
28	November 30	Pittsburgh	2–5	St. Louis		Binnington	18,096	17–5–6	40

December: 9–4–0 (Home: 5–1–0; Road: 4–3–0)
#	Date	Visitor	Score	Home	OT	Decision	Attendance	Record	Pts	Recap
29	December 2	St. Louis	4–0	Chicago		Allen	21,204	18–5–6	42
30	December 4	St. Louis	0–3	Pittsburgh		Binnington	18,411	18–6–6	42
31	December 7	Toronto	5–2	St. Louis		Binnington	18,096	18–7–6	42
32	December 10	St. Louis	2–5	Buffalo		Allen	16,521	18–8–6	42
33	December 12	Vegas	2–4	St. Louis		Binnington	18,096	19–8–6	44
34	December 14	Chicago	3–4	St. Louis		Binnington	18,096	20–8–6	46
35	December 16	Colorado	2–5	St. Louis		Binnington	18,096	21–8–6	48
36	December 18	Edmonton	1–2	St. Louis		Allen	18,096	22–8–6	50
37	December 21	St. Louis	5–2	San Jose		Allen	16,065	23–8–6	52
38	December 23	St. Louis	4–1	Los Angeles		Binnington	18,230	24–8–6	54
39	December 27	St. Louis	5–4	Winnipeg	OT	Binnington	15,325	25–8–6	56
40	December 29	Winnipeg	1–4	St. Louis		Binnington	18,096	26–8–6	58
41	December 31	St. Louis	1–3	Arizona		Allen	14,618	26–9–6	58

January: 5–4–2 (Home: 4–0–1; Road: 1–4–1)
#	Date	Visitor	Score	Home	OT	Decision	Attendance	Record	Pts	Recap
42	January 2	St. Louis	3–7	Colorado		Binnington	18,135	26–10–6	58
43	January 4	St. Louis	4–5	Vegas	OT	Allen	18,334	26–10–7	59
44	January 7	San Jose	2–3	St. Louis		Binnington	18,096	27–10–7	61
45	January 9	Buffalo	1–5	St. Louis		Binnington	18,096	28–10–7	63
46	January 11	NY Rangers	2–5	St. Louis		Binnington	18,096	29–10–7	65
47	January 13	Anaheim	1–4	St. Louis		Allen	18,096	30–10–7	67
48	January 15	Philadelphia	4–3	St. Louis	OT	Binnington	18,096	30–10–8	68
49	January 18	St. Louis	3–5	Colorado		Binnington	18,132	30–11–8	68
50	January 27	St. Louis	1–3	Vancouver		Allen	18,871	30–12–8	68
51	January 28	St. Louis	5–4	Calgary	SO	Binnington	19,033	31–12–8	70
52	January 31	St. Louis	2–4	Edmonton		Allen	17,207	31–13–8	70

February: 8–4–2 (Home: 6–2–1; Road: 2–2–1)
#	Date	Visitor	Score	Home	OT	Decision	Attendance	Record	Pts	Recap
53	February 1	St. Louis	2–5	Winnipeg		Binnington	15,325	31–14–8	70
54	February 4	Carolina	3–6	St. Louis		Binnington	18,096	32–14–8	72
55	February 6	Winnipeg	4–2	St. Louis		Binnington	18,096	32–15–8	72
56	February 8	Dallas	3–2	St. Louis	OT	Binnington	18,096	32–15–9	73
–	February 11	St. Louis		Anaheim	Game rescheduled to March 11 due to a medical emergency.
57	February 13	St. Louis	5–6	Vegas	OT	Binnington	18,252	32–15–10	74
58	February 15	Nashville	4–3	St. Louis		Allen	18,096	32–16–10	74
59	February 16	St. Louis	1–2	Nashville		Binnington	17,349	32–17–10	74
60	February 18	New Jersey	0–3	St. Louis		Binnington	18,096	33–17–10	76
61	February 20	Arizona	0–1	St. Louis		Binnington	18,096	34–17–10	78
62	February 21	St. Louis	5–1	Dallas		Allen	18,532	35–17–10	80
63	February 23	St. Louis	4–1	Minnesota		Binnington	17,266	36–17–10	82
64	February 25	Chicago	5–6	St. Louis		Binnington	18,096	37–17–10	84
65	February 27	NY Islanders	2–3	St. Louis	OT	Binnington	18,096	38–17–10	86
66	February 29	Dallas	3–4	St. Louis	SO	Allen	18,096	39–17–10	88

March: 3–2–0 (Home: 0–1–0; Road: 3–1–0)
#	Date	Visitor	Score	Home	OT	Decision	Attendance	Record	Pts	Recap
67	March 3	St. Louis	3–1	NY Rangers		Binnington	16,091	40–17–10	90
68	March 6	St. Louis	2–4	New Jersey		Binnington	14,685	40–18–10	90
69	March 8	St. Louis	2–0	Chicago		Allen	21,815	41–18–10	92
70	March 9	Florida	2–1	St. Louis		Binnington	18,096	41–19–10	92
71	March 11	St. Louis	4–2	Anaheim		Allen	16,195	42–19–10	94

Cancelled games
#	Date	Visitor	Home
72	March 13	San Jose	St. Louis
73	March 15	Ottawa	St. Louis
74	March 17	St. Louis	Philadelphia
75	March 19	St. Louis	Carolina
76	March 21	St. Louis	Florida
77	March 24	St. Louis	Washington
78	March 27	Los Angeles	St. Louis
79	March 29	Minnesota	St. Louis
80	March 31	Detroit	St. Louis
81	April 2	Boston	St. Louis
82	April 4	St. Louis	Colorado

Legend: Win (2 points) Loss (0 points) Overtime/shootout loss (1 point)

=== Playoffs ===
The Blues played in a round-robin tournament to determine their seed for the playoffs. St. Louis finished with a 0–2–1 record to secure the fourth seed for the playoffs.

The Blues faced the Vancouver Canucks in the first round, and were eliminated in six games.

2020 Stanley Cup playoffs

Western Conference Seeding Round-robin
#	Date	Visitor	Score	Home	OT	Decision	Record	Points	Recap
1	August 2	St. Louis	1–2	Colorado		Binnington	0–1–0	0
2	August 6	Vegas	6–4	St. Louis		Binnington	0–2–0	0
3	August 9	Dallas	2–1	St. Louis	SO	Allen	0–2–1	1

Western Conference First Round vs. (5) Vancouver Canucks: Vancouver won 4–2
#	Date	Visitor	Score	Home	OT	Decision	Series	Recap
1	August 12	Vancouver	5–2	St. Louis		Binnington	0–1
2	August 14	Vancouver	4–3	St. Louis	OT	Binnington	0–2
3	August 16	St. Louis	3–2	Vancouver	OT	Allen	1–2
4	August 17	St. Louis	3–1	Vancouver		Allen	2–2
5	August 19	Vancouver	4–3	St. Louis		Allen	2–3
6	August 21	St. Louis	2–6	Vancouver		Binnington	2–4

Legend: Win (2 points) Loss (0 points) Overtime/shootout loss (1 point)

== Player statistics ==
=== Skaters ===
Regular season
Player	GP	G	A	Pts	+/−	PIM
Ryan O'Reilly	71	12	49	61	11	10
David Perron	71	25	35	60	2	52
Brayden Schenn	71	25	33	58	3	44
Jaden Schwartz	71	22	35	57	3	18
Alex Pietrangelo	70	16	36	52	11	20
Robert Thomas	66	10	32	42	9	18
Zach Sanford	58	16	14	30	13	28
Tyler Bozak	67	13	16	29	0	10
Colton Parayko	64	10	18	28	8	16
Ivan Barbashev	69	11	15	26	4	23
Oskar Sundqvist	57	12	11	23	5	28
Vince Dunn	71	9	14	23	15	27
Alexander Steen	55	7	10	17	7	12
Justin Faulk	69	5	11	16	−3	32
Samuel Blais	40	6	7	13	−2	20
Mackenzie MacEachern	51	7	3	10	2	33
Vladimir Tarasenko	10	3	7	10	−2	0
Jordan Kyrou	28	4	5	9	1	8
Jay Bouwmeester	56	1	8	9	6	20
Carl Gunnarsson	36	2	5	7	8	16
Robert Bortuzzo	42	2	4	6	12	21
Jacob de la Rose^{†}	34	1	4	5	−1	6
Nathan Walker	5	1	1	2	−2	4
Robby Fabbri^{‡}	9	1	0	1	−4	2
Troy Brouwer	13	1	0	1	1	7
Klim Kostin	4	1	0	1	1	0
Marco Scandella^{†}	11	0	1	1	4	4
Niko Mikkola	5	0	1	1	3	0
Jake Walman	1	0	0	0	1	0
Derrick Pouliot	2	0	0	0	−1	2
Austin Poganski	1	0	0	0	0	0

Playoffs
Player	GP	G	A	Pts	+/−	PIM
Ryan O'Reilly	9	4	7	11	3	0
David Perron	9	4	5	9	2	8
Alex Pietrangelo	9	1	5	6	0	6
Brayden Schenn	9	2	3	5	−2	6
Jaden Schwartz	9	4	0	4	−3	4
Zach Sanford	9	1	3	4	−1	17
Samuel Blais	8	1	3	4	0	12
Robert Thomas	8	1	2	3	0	2
Vince Dunn	9	0	3	3	−2	8
Colton Parayko	9	2	0	2	−4	2
Tyler Bozak	8	0	2	2	−3	2
Troy Brouwer	4	1	0	1	1	4
Justin Faulk	9	1	0	1	0	2
Oskar Sundqvist	9	0	1	1	−4	2
Carl Gunnarsson	6	0	1	1	2	6
Vladimir Tarasenko	4	0	0	0	−1	0
Robert Bortuzzo	3	0	0	0	−3	0
Mackenzie MacEachern	5	0	0	0	−2	6
Jordan Kyrou	5	0	0	0	−1	0
Jacob de la Rose	5	0	0	0	−1	0
Ivan Barbashev	3	0	0	0	0	2
Marco Scandella	9	0	0	0	−3	0
Alexander Steen	4	0	0	0	−1	6

=== Goaltenders ===
Regular season
Player	GP	GS	TOI	W	L	OT	GA	GAA	SA	SV%	SO	G	A	PIM
Jordan Binnington	50	50	2,947:41	30	13	7	126	2.56	1,430	.912	3	0	1	4
Jake Allen	24	21	1,339:04	12	6	3	48	2.15	655	.927	2	0	0	0

Playoffs
Player	GP	GS	TOI	W	L	OT	GA	GAA	SA	SV%	SO	G	A	PIM
Jake Allen	5	4	285:41	2	1	1	9	1.89	138	.935	0	0	0	2
Jordan Binnington	5	5	266:47	0	5	0	21	4.72	141	.851	0	0	0	0

^{†}Denotes player spent time with another team before joining the Blues. Stats reflect time with the Blues only.
^{‡}Denotes player was traded mid-season. Stats reflect time with the Blues only.
Bold/italics denotes franchise record.

== Transactions ==
The Blues have been involved in the following transactions during the 2019–20 season.

=== Trades ===
Date	Details		Ref
July 12, 2019	To Toronto Maple Leafs Future considerations	To St. Louis Blues Dakota Joshua	
July 25, 2019	To Toronto Maple Leafs Jordan Schmaltz	To St. Louis Blues Andreas Borgman	
September 24, 2019	To Carolina Hurricanes Dominik Bokk; Joel Edmundson; 7th-round pick in 2021	To St. Louis Blues Justin Faulk; 5th-round pick in 2020	
November 6, 2019	To Detroit Red Wings Robby Fabbri	To St. Louis Blues Jacob de la Rose	
February 18, 2020	To Montreal Canadiens 2nd-round pick in 2020; Conditional 4th-round pick in 2021	To St. Louis Blues Marco Scandella	

=== Free agents ===
Date	Player	Team	Contract term	Ref
July 1, 2019	Jake Dotchin	from Anaheim Ducks	1-year	
July 1, 2019	Nick Lappin	from New Jersey Devils	1-year	
July 1, 2019	Evan Polei	from Bakersfield Condors (AHL)	2-year	
July 1, 2019	Derrick Pouliot	from Vancouver Canucks	1-year	
July 1, 2019	Mike Vecchione	from Philadelphia Flyers	1-year	
July 1, 2019	Nathan Walker	from Washington Capitals	1-year	
July 1, 2019	Tyler Wotherspoon	to Philadelphia Flyers	2-year	
July 1, 2019	Jani Hakanpaa	to Anaheim Ducks	1-year	
July 10, 2019	Jared Coreau	to New York Islanders	1-year	
July 16, 2019	Michael Del Zotto	to Anaheim Ducks	1-year	
August 24, 2019	Patrick Maroon	to Tampa Bay Lightning	1-year	
September 3, 2019	Conner Bleackley	to Idaho Steelheads (ECHL)	1-year	
November 20, 2019	Troy Brouwer	from Florida Panthers	1-year	

=== Waivers ===
Date	Player	Team	Ref
July 1, 2019		from/to	

=== Contract terminations ===
Date	Player	Via	Ref
June 25, 2019	Adam Musil	Mutual termination	

=== Retirement ===
Date	Player	Ref
July 3, 2019	Chris Butler	
October 13, 2019	Chris Thorburn	

=== Signings ===
Date	Player	Contract term	Ref
June 23, 2019	Jordan Nolan	1-year	
June 23, 2019	Nolan Stevens	1-year	
June 27, 2019	Carl Gunnarsson	2-year	
July 1, 2019	Samuel Blais	1-year	
July 8, 2019	Zach Sanford	2-year	
July 12, 2019	Robby Fabbri	1-year	
July 12, 2019	Dakota Joshua	2-year	
July 12, 2019	Mitch Reinke	1-year	
July 13, 2019	Jordan Binnington	2-year	
July 20, 2019	Ville Husso	1-year	
July 21, 2019	Oskar Sundqvist	4-year	
August 1, 2019	Nikita Alexandrov	3-year	
August 6, 2019	Joel Edmundson	1-year	
September 1, 2019	Ivan Barbashev	2-year	
September 24, 2019	Justin Faulk	7-year	
October 4, 2019	Brayden Schenn	8-year	
October 17, 2019	Mathis Laferriere	3-year	

== Draft picks ==
Below are the St. Louis Blues' selections at the 2019 NHL entry draft, which was held on June 21 and 22, 2019, at Rogers Arena in Vancouver, British Columbia.

Round	#	Player	Pos	Nationality	College/Junior/Club team (League)
2	62	Nikita Alexandrov	C	Russia	Charlottetown Islanders (QMJHL)
3	93	Colten Ellis	G	Canada	Rimouski Océanic (QMJHL)
5	155	Keean Washkurak	C	Canada	Mississauga Steelheads (OHL)
7	208^{1}	Vadim Zherenko	G	Russia	MHC Dynamo Moscow (MHL)
7	217	Jeremy Michel	LW	Canada	Val-d'Or Foreurs (QMJHL)

Notes:

1. The Toronto Maple Leafs' seventh-round pick went to the St. Louis Blues as the result of a trade on June 22, 2019, that sent a seventh-round pick in 2020 to Toronto in exchange for this pick.
