= 2019–20 Edmonton Oilers season =

Professional ice hockey team season

2019–20 Edmonton Oilers
- Division: 2nd Pacific
- Conference: 5th Western
- 2019–20 record: 37–25–9
- Home record: 17–11–6
- Road record: 20–14–3
- Goals for: 225
- Goals against: 217

Team information
- General manager: Ken Holland
- Coach: Dave Tippett
- Captain: Connor McDavid
- Alternate captains: Leon Draisaitl; Adam Larsson; Ryan Nugent-Hopkins; Darnell Nurse
- Arena: Rogers Place
- Average attendance: 17,533
- Minor league affiliates: Bakersfield Condors (AHL); Wichita Thunder (ECHL)

Team leaders
- Goals: Leon Draisaitl (43)
- Assists: Leon Draisaitl (67)
- Points: Leon Draisaitl (110)
- Penalty minutes: Zack Kassian (69)
- Plus/minus: Kailer Yamamoto (+17)
- Wins: Mike Smith (19)
- Goals against average: Mikko Koskinen (2.75)

The 2019–20 Edmonton Oilers season was the 41st season for the National Hockey League (NHL) franchise that was established on June 22, 1979, and 48th season including their play in the World Hockey Association (WHA).

The season was suspended by the league officials on March 12, 2020, after several other professional and collegiate sports organizations followed suit as a result of the ongoing COVID-19 pandemic. On May 26, the NHL regular season was officially declared over with the remaining games being cancelled. The Oilers advanced to the playoffs for the first time since the 2016–17 season and lost to the Chicago Blackhawks in four games in the qualifying round.

The season also saw one of their roster players, Colby Cave die after suffering a brain bleed due to a colloid cyst after being in a coma for four days.

== Regular season ==
The Oilers started their season with a 3–2 win against the Vancouver Canucks on October 2. The Oilers had a 5-game winning streak, where they came back in all those games, that set an NHL record.

== Standings ==
=== Divisional standings ===
Pacific Division
Pos	Team	GP	W	L	OTL	RW	GF	GA	GD	Pts
1	Vegas Golden Knights	71	39	24	8	30	227	211	+16	86
2	Edmonton Oilers	71	37	25	9	31	225	217	+8	83
3	Calgary Flames	70	36	27	7	25	210	215	−5	79
4	Vancouver Canucks	69	36	27	6	27	228	217	+11	78
5	Arizona Coyotes	70	33	29	8	26	195	187	+8	74
6	Anaheim Ducks	71	29	33	9	20	187	226	−39	67
7	Los Angeles Kings	70	29	35	6	21	178	212	−34	64
8	San Jose Sharks	70	29	36	5	22	182	226	−44	63

Source: National Hockey League

=== Western Conference ===
Pos	Team	GP	W	L	OTL	RW	GF	GA	GD	PCT	Qualification
1	St. Louis Blues	71	42	19	10	33	225	193	+32	.662	Advance to Seeding round-robin tournament
2	Colorado Avalanche	70	42	20	8	37	237	191	+46	.657	Advance to Seeding round-robin tournament
3	Vegas Golden Knights	71	39	24	8	30	227	211	+16	.606	Advance to Seeding round-robin tournament
4	Dallas Stars	69	37	24	8	26	180	177	+3	.594	Advance to Seeding round-robin tournament
5	Edmonton Oilers	71	37	25	9	31	225	217	+8	.585	Advance to 2020 Stanley Cup playoffs qualifying round
6	Nashville Predators	69	35	26	8	28	215	217	−2	.565	Advance to 2020 Stanley Cup playoffs qualifying round
7	Vancouver Canucks	69	36	27	6	27	228	217	+11	.565	Advance to 2020 Stanley Cup playoffs qualifying round
8	Calgary Flames	70	36	27	7	25	210	215	−5	.564	Advance to 2020 Stanley Cup playoffs qualifying round
9	Winnipeg Jets	71	37	28	6	30	216	203	+13	.563	Advance to 2020 Stanley Cup playoffs qualifying round
10	Minnesota Wild	69	35	27	7	30	220	220	0	.558	Advance to 2020 Stanley Cup playoffs qualifying round
11	Arizona Coyotes	70	33	29	8	26	195	187	+8	.529	Advance to 2020 Stanley Cup playoffs qualifying round
12	Chicago Blackhawks	70	32	30	8	23	212	218	−6	.514	Advance to 2020 Stanley Cup playoffs qualifying round
13	Anaheim Ducks	71	29	33	9	20	187	226	−39	.472	
14	Los Angeles Kings	70	29	35	6	21	178	212	−34	.457	
15	San Jose Sharks	70	29	36	5	22	182	226	−44	.450	

Source: National Hockey League

Tiebreaking procedures

1. Fewer number of games played (only used during regular season).
2. Greater number of regulation wins (denoted by RW).
3. Greater number of wins in regulation and overtime (excluding shootout wins; denoted by ROW).
4. Greater number of total wins (including shootouts).
5. Greater number of points earned in head-to-head play; if teams played an uneven number of head-to-head games, the result of the first game on the home ice of the team with the extra home game is discarded.
6. Greater goal differential (difference between goals for and goals against).
7. Greater number of goals scored (denoted by GF).

== Schedule and results ==
=== Pre-season ===
The pre-season schedule was published on June 13, 2019.

2019 pre-season game log: 3–4–0 (Home: 2–2–0; Road: 1–2–0)
#	Date	Visitor	Score	Home	OT	Decision	Attendance	Record	Recap
1	September 16	Winnipeg	0–2	Edmonton		Skinner	—	1–0–0
2	September 17	Edmonton	2–4	Vancouver		Starrett	17,738	1–1–0
3	September 19	Vancouver	6–1	Edmonton		Koskinen	15,789	1–2–0
4	September 20	Calgary	2–6	Edmonton		Koskinen	17,592	2–2–0
5	September 24	Arizona	4–2	Edmonton		Koskinen	15,976	2–3–0
6	September 26	Edmonton	5–3	Winnipeg		Smith	15,325	3–3–0
7	September 28	Edmonton	2–3	Calgary		Koskinen	18,896	3–4–0

=== Regular season ===
The regular season schedule was published on June 25, 2019.

2019–20 game log

October: 9–4–1 (Home: 5–1–0; Road: 4–3–1)
#	Date	Visitor	Score	Home	OT	Decision	Attendance	Record	Pts	Recap
1	October 2	Vancouver	2–3	Edmonton		Smith	18,347	1–0–0	2
2	October 5	Los Angeles	5–6	Edmonton		Smith	18,347	2–0–0	4
3	October 8	Edmonton	5–2	NY Islanders		Koskinen	10,985	3–0–0	6
4	October 10	Edmonton	4–3	New Jersey	SO	Koskinen	14,586	4–0–0	8
5	October 12	Edmonton	4–1	NY Rangers		Smith	17,177	5–0–0	10
6	October 14	Edmonton	1–3	Chicago		Smith	21,260	5–1–0	10
7	October 16	Philadelphia	3–6	Edmonton		Koskinen	17,107	6–1–0	12
8	October 18	Detroit	1–2	Edmonton		Koskinen	17,420	7–1–0	14
9	October 20	Edmonton	0–1	Winnipeg	SO	Smith	15,321	7–1–1	15
10	October 22	Edmonton	0–3	Minnesota		Smith	17,189	7–2–1	15
11	October 24	Washington	3–4	Edmonton	OT	Koskinen	17,144	8–2–1	17
12	October 27	Florida	6–2	Edmonton		Smith	17,278	8–3–1	17
13	October 29	Edmonton	1–3	Detroit		Koskinen	19,515	8–4–1	17
14	October 30	Edmonton	4–1	Columbus		Smith	14,193	9–4–1	19

November: 7–5–2 (Home: 2–2–2; Road: 5–3–0)
#	Date	Visitor	Score	Home	OT	Decision	Attendance	Record	Pts	Recap
15	November 2	Edmonton	2–1	Pittsburgh	OT	Smith	18,618	10–4–1	21
16	November 4	Arizona	3–2	Edmonton	OT	Koskinen	17,105	10–4–2	22
17	November 6	St. Louis	5–2	Edmonton		Smith	17,068	10–5–2	22
18	November 8	New Jersey	0–4	Edmonton		Koskinen	17,240	11–5–2	24
19	November 10	Edmonton	6–2	Anaheim		Koskinen	16,463	12–5–2	26
20	November 12	Edmonton	3–6	San Jose		Smith	15,567	12–6–2	26
21	November 14	Colorado	2–6	Edmonton		Smith	17,188	13–6–2	28
22	November 16	Dallas	5–4	Edmonton	OT	Koskinen	17,346	13–6–3	29
23	November 19	Edmonton	5–2	San Jose		Koskinen	16,147	14–6–3	31
24	November 21	Edmonton	1–5	Los Angeles		Smith	15,539	14–7–3	31
25	November 23	Edmonton	4–2	Vegas		Smith	18,319	15–7–3	33
26	November 24	Edmonton	4–3	Arizona	SO	Koskinen	12,908	16–7–3	35
27	November 27	Edmonton	1–4	Colorado		Koskinen	18,021	16–8–3	35
28	November 30	Vancouver	5–2	Edmonton		Smith	18,035	16–9–3	35

December: 5–8–1 (Home: 3–5–1; Road: 2–3–0)
#	Date	Visitor	Score	Home	OT	Decision	Attendance	Record	Pts	Recap
29	December 1	Edmonton	3–2	Vancouver		Koskinen	18,871	17–9–3	37
30	December 4	Ottawa	5–2	Edmonton		Koskinen	17,162	17–10–3	37
31	December 6	Los Angeles	1–2	Edmonton		Koskinen	17,044	18–10–3	39
32	December 8	Buffalo	3–2	Edmonton	OT	Smith	17,227	18–10–4	40
33	December 10	Carolina	6–3	Edmonton		Koskinen	16,175	18–11–4	40
34	December 12	Edmonton	5–6	Minnesota		Smith	17,271	18–12–4	40
35	December 14	Toronto	4–1	Edmonton		Koskinen	18,347	18–13–4	40
36	December 16	Edmonton	2–1	Dallas		Koskinen	18,096	19–13–4	42
37	December 18	Edmonton	1–2	St. Louis		Koskinen	18,096	19–14–4	42
38	December 20	Pittsburgh	5–2	Edmonton		Smith	18,347	19–15–4	42
39	December 21	Montreal	3–4	Edmonton		Koskinen	18,347	20–15–4	44
40	December 23	Edmonton	2–4	Vancouver		Koskinen	18,851	20–16–4	44
41	December 27	Calgary	5–1	Edmonton		Koskinen	18,347	20–17–4	44
42	December 31	NY Rangers	5–7	Edmonton		Koskinen	18,347	21–17–4	46

January: 6–1–2 (Home: 3–0–1; Road: 3–1–1)
#	Date	Visitor	Score	Home	OT	Decision	Attendance	Record	Pts	Recap
43	January 2	Edmonton	2–3	Buffalo	OT	Smith	19,070	21–17–5	47
44	January 4	Edmonton	4–1	Boston		Smith	17,850	22–17–5	49
45	January 6	Edmonton	6–4	Toronto		Smith	19,507	23–17–5	51
46	January 9	Edmonton	4–2	Montreal		Smith	21,302	24–17–5	53
47	January 11	Edmonton	3–4	Calgary		Koskinen	19,289	24–18–5	53
48	January 14	Nashville	2–4	Edmonton		Smith	17,029	25–18–5	55
49	January 18	Arizona	3–7	Edmonton		Smith	18,347	26–18–5	57
50	January 29	Calgary	4–3	Edmonton	SO	Smith	18,347	26–18–6	58
51	January 31	St. Louis	2–4	Edmonton		Koskinen	17,207	27–18–6	60

February: 7–5–2 (Home: 3–2–1; Road: 4–3–1)
#	Date	Visitor	Score	Home	OT	Decision	Attendance	Record	Pts	Recap
52	February 1	Edmonton	8–3	Calgary		Smith	19,289	28–18–6	62
53	February 4	Edmonton	0–3	Arizona		Koskinen	14,725	28–19–6	62
54	February 6	San Jose	6–3	Edmonton		Koskinen	17,175	28–20–6	62
55	February 8	Nashville	2–3	Edmonton		Smith	17,212	29–20–6	64
56	February 11	Chicago	3–5	Edmonton		Smith	17,066	30–20–6	66
57	February 13	Edmonton	1–3	Tampa Bay		Smith	19,092	30–21–6	66
58	February 15	Edmonton	4–1	Florida		Koskinen	15,069	31–21–6	68
59	February 16	Edmonton	4–3	Carolina	OT	Smith	18,680	32–21–6	70
60	February 19	Boston	2–1	Edmonton	OT	Smith	17,804	32–21–7	71
61	February 21	Minnesota	5–3	Edmonton		Koskinen	17,055	32–22–7	71
62	February 23	Edmonton	4–2	Los Angeles		Smith	18,230	33–22–7	73
63	February 25	Edmonton	3–4	Anaheim	OT	Smith	15,431	33–22–8	74
64	February 26	Edmonton	0–3	Vegas		Koskinen	18,421	33–23–8	74
65	February 29	Winnipeg	2–3	Edmonton		Smith	18,347	34–23–8	76

March: 3–2–1 (Home: 1–1–1; Road: 2–1–0)
#	Date	Visitor	Score	Home	OT	Decision	Attendance	Record	Pts	Recap
66	March 2	Edmonton	8–3	Nashville		Smith	17,316	35–23–8	78
67	March 3	Edmonton	2–1	Dallas	OT	Koskinen	18,532	36–23–8	80
68	March 5	Edmonton	3–4	Chicago		Smith	21,481	36–24–8	80
69	March 7	Columbus	1–4	Edmonton		Koskinen	17,085	37–24–8	82
70	March 9	Vegas	3–2	Edmonton	OT	Koskinen	17,327	37–24–9	83
71	March 11	Winnipeg	4–2	Edmonton		Smith	17,165	37–25–9	83

Cancelled games
#	Date	Visitor	Home
72	March 13	NY Islanders	Edmonton
73	March 15	Edmonton	Philadelphia
74	March 16	Edmonton	Washington
75	March 18	Edmonton	Ottawa
76	March 20	Tampa Bay	Edmonton
77	March 23	Anaheim	Edmonton
78	March 25	Colorado	Edmonton
79	March 27	San Jose	Edmonton
80	March 29	Anaheim	Edmonton
81	March 31	Vegas	Edmonton
82	April 4	Edmonton	Calgary

Legend: Win (2 points) Loss (0 points) Overtime/shootout loss (1 point)

=== Playoffs ===
The Oilers were defeated in four games by the Chicago Blackhawks in the qualifying round.

2020 Stanley Cup playoffs

Western Conference Qualifying Round vs. (12) Chicago Blackhawks: Chicago won 3–1
#	Date	Visitor	Score	Home	OT	Decision	Series	Recap
1	August 1	Chicago	6–4	Edmonton		Smith	0–1
2	August 3	Chicago	3–6	Edmonton		Koskinen	1–1
3	August 5	Edmonton	3–4	Chicago		Koskinen	1–2
4	August 7	Edmonton	2–3	Chicago		Koskinen	1–3

Legend: Win Loss

== Player statistics ==
=== Skaters ===
Regular season
Player	GP	G	A	Pts	+/−	PIM
Leon Draisaitl	71	43	67	110	−7	18
Connor McDavid	64	34	63	97	−6	28
Ryan Nugent-Hopkins	65	22	39	61	1	33
Zack Kassian	59	15	19	34	0	69
Oscar Klefbom	62	5	29	34	−17	24
Darnell Nurse	71	5	28	33	−2	48
James Neal	55	19	12	31	−20	12
Kailer Yamamoto	27	11	15	26	17	12
Alex Chiasson	65	11	13	24	−3	42
Josh Archibald	62	12	9	21	−8	12
Ethan Bear	71	5	16	21	−4	33
Riley Sheahan	66	8	7	15	−13	6
Sam Gagner^{‡}	36	5	7	12	−9	10
Jujhar Khaira	64	6	4	10	−19	38
Gaetan Haas	58	5	5	10	−1	6
Caleb Jones	43	4	5	9	−1	10
Joakim Nygard	33	3	6	9	0	8
Kris Russell	55	0	9	9	0	14
Matt Benning	43	1	7	8	8	15
Adam Larsson	49	1	5	6	0	35
Patrick Russell	45	0	5	5	−11	12
Markus Granlund	34	3	1	4	−1	14
Tyler Ennis^{†}	9	2	2	4	−1	4
Andreas Athanasiou^{†}	9	1	1	2	−1	4
Tomas Jurco	12	0	2	2	1	4
Joel Persson^{‡}	13	0	2	2	−1	2
Colby Cave	11	1	0	1	−3	4
Brandon Manning	9	1	0	1	−1	17
Tyler Benson	7	0	1	1	−1	0
William Lagesson	8	0	0	0	−4	0
Mike Green^{†}	2	0	0	0	−2	0

Playoffs
Player	GP	G	A	Pts	+/−	PIM
Connor McDavid	4	5	4	9	1	2
Ryan Nugent-Hopkins	4	2	6	8	−2	0
Leon Draisaitl	4	3	3	6	1	0
James Neal	4	2	1	3	3	0
Tyler Ennis	3	1	1	2	0	4
Alex Chiasson	4	1	1	2	1	0
Oscar Klefbom	4	0	2	2	0	0
Darnell Nurse	4	0	2	2	−3	6
Josh Archibald	4	1	0	1	1	4
Matt Benning	4	0	1	1	2	6
Gaetan Haas	1	0	0	0	0	0
Kailer Yamamoto	4	0	0	0	−1	6
Caleb Jones	2	0	0	0	1	0
Ethan Bear	4	0	0	0	−4	0
Andreas Athanasiou	4	0	0	0	−2	2
Jujhar Khaira	4	0	0	0	0	2
Riley Sheahan	4	0	0	0	−1	2
Zack Kassian	4	0	0	0	−4	2
Kris Russell	4	0	0	0	−1	2
Adam Larsson	2	0	0	0	−1	0

=== Goaltenders ===
Regular season
Player	GP	GS	TOI	W	L	OT	GA	GAA	SA	SV%	SO	G	A	PIM
Mike Smith	39	37	2,156:51	19	12	6	106	2.95	1,087	.902	1	0	2	21
Mikko Koskinen	38	34	2,116:31	18	13	3	97	2.75	1,175	.917	1	0	0	0

Playoffs
Player	GP	GS	TOI	W	L	GA	GAA	SA	SV%	SO	G	A	PIM
Mikko Koskinen	4	3	208:55	1	2	11	3.16	99	.889	0	0	0	0
Mike Smith	1	1	26:32	0	1	5	11.31	23	.783	0	0	0	0

^{†}Denotes player spent time with another team before joining the Oilers. Stats reflect time with the Oilers only.
^{‡}Denotes player was traded mid-season. Stats reflect time with the Oilers only.

== Transactions ==
The Oilers have been involved in the following transactions during the 2019–20 season.

=== Trades ===
Date	Details		Ref
July 19, 2019	To Calgary Flames Milan Lucic conditional 3rd-round pick in 2020	To Edmonton Oilers James Neal	
July 26, 2019	To Pittsburgh Penguins John Marino	To Edmonton Oilers 6th-round pick in 2021	
February 23, 2020	To Detroit Red Wings Kyle Brodziak conditional 3rd-round pick in 2021 or conditional 4th-round pick in 2020	To Edmonton Oilers Mike Green	
February 24, 2020	To Detroit Red Wings Sam Gagner; 2nd-round pick in 2020; 2nd-round pick in 2021	To Edmonton Oilers Andreas Athanasiou; Ryan Kuffner	
February 24, 2020	To Ottawa Senators 5th-round pick in 2021	To Edmonton Oilers Tyler Ennis	
February 24, 2020	To Anaheim Ducks Joel Persson	To Edmonton Oilers Angus Redmond conditional 7th-round pick in 2022	

=== Free agents ===
Date	Player	Team	Contract term	Ref
July 1, 2019	Markus Granlund	from Vancouver Canucks	1-year	
July 1, 2019	Kevin Gravel	to Toronto Maple Leafs	1-year	
July 1, 2019	Gaëtan Haas	from SC Bern (NL)	1-year	
July 1, 2019	Tomáš Jurčo	from Charlotte Checkers (AHL)	1-year	
July 1, 2019	Andrej Sekera	to Dallas Stars	1-year	
July 1, 2019	Mike Smith	from Calgary Flames	1-year	
July 2, 2019	Anthony Stolarz	to Anaheim Ducks	2-year	
July 10, 2019	Ty Rattie	to Lokomotiv Yaroslavl (KHL)	1-year	
July 16, 2019	Josh Archibald	from Arizona Coyotes	1-year	
July 19, 2019	Mitch Callahan	to Augsburger Panther (DEL)		
July 29, 2019	Ryan Stanton	to Ontario Reign (AHL)	1-year	
August 27, 2019	Jesse Puljujärvi	to Kärpät (Liiga)	1-year	
September 5, 2019	Riley Sheahan	from Florida Panthers	1-year	
September 26, 2019	Alex Petrovic	to Boston Bruins	1-year	
September 27, 2019	Tobias Rieder	to Calgary Flames	1-year	
October 10, 2019	Tyler Vesel	to IF Björklöven (HockeyAllsvenskan)		
April 29, 2020	Theodor Lennström	from Frölunda HC (SHL)	1-year	
April 29, 2020	Brad Malone	to Bakersfield Condors (AHL)	2-year	
July 17, 2020	Markus Granlund	to Salavat Yulaev Ufa (KHL)	2-year	
September 10, 2020	Adam Cracknell	from Kunlun Red Star (KHL)	1-year	
September 15, 2020	Graham McPhee	to Bakersfield Condors (AHL)		

=== Waivers ===
Date	Player	Team	Ref

=== Contract terminations ===
Date	Player	Via	Ref
July 1, 2019	Andrej Sekera	Buyout	

=== Retirement ===
Date	Player	Ref
August 26, 2020	Mike Green	

=== Signings ===
Date	Player	Contract term	Ref
July 1, 2019	Alex Chiasson	2-year	
July 1, 2019	Jujhar Khaira	2-year	
July 4, 2019	Philip Broberg	3-year	
January 15, 2020	Caleb Jones	2-year	
January 30, 2020	Zack Kassian	4-year	
February 10, 2020	Darnell Nurse	2-year	
February 12, 2020	Joakim Nygård	1-year	
March 6, 2020	Josh Archibald	2-year	
March 21, 2020	Raphaël Lavoie	3-year	
April 28, 2020	Gaëtan Haas	1-year	
April 30, 2020	Markus Niemeläinen	2-year	
May 1, 2020	Filip Berglund	2-year	
August 31, 2020	Patrick Russell	1-year	

== Draft picks ==
Below are the Edmonton Oilers' selections at the 2019 NHL entry draft, which was held on June 21 and 22, 2019, at the Rogers Arena in Vancouver.

Round	#	Player	Pos	Nationality	College/Junior/Club team (League)
1	8	Philip Broberg	D	Sweden	AIK (HockeyAllsvenskan)
2	38	Raphael Lavoie	C	Canada	Halifax Mooseheads (QMJHL)
3	85^{1}	Ilya Konovalov	G	Russia	Lokomotiv Yaroslavl (KHL)
4	100	Matej Blümel	RW	Czech Republic	Waterloo Black Hawks (USHL)
6	162	Tomas Mazura	C	Czech Republic	Kimball Union Academy (USHS)
7	193	Maxim Denezhkin	C	Russia	Loko Yaroslavl (MHL)

Notes:

1. The New York Islanders' third-round pick went to the Edmonton Oilers as the result of a trade on February 24, 2018, that sent Brandon Davidson to New York in exchange for this pick.
