= 2019–20 New York Rangers season =

National Hockey League season

2019–20 New York Rangers
- Division: 7th Metropolitan
- Conference: 11th Eastern
- 2019–20 record: 37–28–5
- Home record: 18–16–2
- Road record: 19–12–3
- Goals for: 234
- Goals against: 222

Team information
- General manager: Jeff Gorton
- Coach: David Quinn
- Captain: Vacant
- Alternate captains: Jesper Fast; Chris Kreider; Marc Staal; Mika Zibanejad
- Arena: Madison Square Garden
- Average attendance: 17,206
- Minor league affiliates: Hartford Wolf Pack (AHL); Maine Mariners (ECHL)

Team leaders
- Goals: Mika Zibanejad (41)
- Assists: Artemi Panarin (63)
- Points: Artemi Panarin (95)
- Penalty minutes: Brendan Lemieux (111)
- Plus/minus: Artemi Panarin (+36)
- Wins: Alexandar Georgiev (17)
- Goals against average: Igor Shesterkin (2.52)

The 2019–20 New York Rangers season was the franchise's 93rd season of play and their 94th season overall.

The season was suspended by the league officials on March 12, 2020, after several other professional and collegiate sports organizations followed suit as a result of the ongoing COVID-19 pandemic. On May 26, the NHL regular season was officially declared over with the remaining games being cancelled. The Rangers advanced to the playoffs for the first time since the 2016–17 season, but were swept in the qualifying round by the Carolina Hurricanes.

== Standings ==
=== Divisional standings ===
Metropolitan Division
Pos	Team	GP	W	L	OTL	RW	GF	GA	GD	Pts
1	Washington Capitals	69	41	20	8	31	240	215	+25	90
2	Philadelphia Flyers	69	41	21	7	31	232	196	+36	89
3	Pittsburgh Penguins	69	40	23	6	29	224	196	+28	86
4	Carolina Hurricanes	68	38	25	5	27	222	193	+29	81
5	Columbus Blue Jackets	70	33	22	15	25	180	187	−7	81
6	New York Islanders	68	35	23	10	24	192	193	−1	80
7	New York Rangers	70	37	28	5	31	234	222	+12	79
8	New Jersey Devils	69	28	29	12	22	189	230	−41	68

Source: National Hockey League

=== Conference standings ===
Pos	Team	GP	W	L	OTL	RW	GF	GA	GD	PCT	Qualification
1	Boston Bruins	70	44	14	12	38	227	174	+53	.714	Advance to Seeding round-robin tournament
2	Tampa Bay Lightning	70	43	21	6	35	245	195	+50	.657	Advance to Seeding round-robin tournament
3	Washington Capitals	69	41	20	8	31	240	215	+25	.652	Advance to Seeding round-robin tournament
4	Philadelphia Flyers	69	41	21	7	31	232	196	+36	.645	Advance to Seeding round-robin tournament
5	Pittsburgh Penguins	69	40	23	6	29	224	196	+28	.623	Advance to 2020 Stanley Cup playoffs qualifying round
6	Carolina Hurricanes	68	38	25	5	27	222	193	+29	.596	Advance to 2020 Stanley Cup playoffs qualifying round
7	New York Islanders	68	35	23	10	24	192	193	−1	.588	Advance to 2020 Stanley Cup playoffs qualifying round
8	Toronto Maple Leafs	70	36	25	9	28	238	227	+11	.579	Advance to 2020 Stanley Cup playoffs qualifying round
9	Columbus Blue Jackets	70	33	22	15	25	180	187	−7	.579	Advance to 2020 Stanley Cup playoffs qualifying round
10	Florida Panthers	69	35	26	8	30	231	228	+3	.565	Advance to 2020 Stanley Cup playoffs qualifying round
11	New York Rangers	70	37	28	5	31	234	222	+12	.564	Advance to 2020 Stanley Cup playoffs qualifying round
12	Montreal Canadiens	71	31	31	9	19	212	221	−9	.500	Advance to 2020 Stanley Cup playoffs qualifying round
13	Buffalo Sabres	69	30	31	8	22	195	217	−22	.493	
14	New Jersey Devils	69	28	29	12	22	189	230	−41	.493	
15	Ottawa Senators	71	25	34	12	18	191	243	−52	.437	
16	Detroit Red Wings	71	17	49	5	13	145	267	−122	.275	

Source: National Hockey League

== Schedule and results ==
=== Pre-season ===
The preseason schedule was published on June 18, 2019.

2019 pre-season game log: 2–4–0 (Home: 2–1–0; Road: 0–3–0)

Game	Date	Opponent	Score	Record
1	September 18	New Jersey Devils	3–4	0–1–0
2	September 20	@ New Jersey Devils	2–4	0–2–0
3	September 21	@ Philadelphia Flyers	1–4	0–3–0
4	September 24	New York Islanders	3–1	1–3–0
5	September 26	Philadelphia Flyers	2–1 SO	2–3–0
6	September 28	@ New York Islanders	2–4	2–4–0

=== Regular season ===
The regular season schedule was published on June 25, 2019.

2019–20 game log
October: 4–5–1, 9 points (Home: 3–3–1; Road: 1–2–0)

Game	Date	Opponent	Score	OT	Decision	Location	Attendance	Record	Points	Recap
1	October 3	Winnipeg	6–4		Lundqvist	Madison Square Garden	18,006	1–0–0	2	
2	October 5	@ Ottawa	4–1		Georgiev	Canadian Tire Centre	15,135	2–0–0	4	
3	October 12	Edmonton	1–4		Lundqvist	Madison Square Garden	17,177	2–1–0	4	
4	October 17	@ New Jersey	2–5		Georgiev	Prudential Center	16,514	2–2–0	4	
5	October 18	@ Washington	2–5		Lundqvist	Capital One Arena	18,573	2–3–0	4	
6	October 20	Vancouver	2–3		Lundqvist	Madison Square Garden	17,030	2–4–0	4	
7	October 22	Arizona	2–3	OT	Georgiev	Madison Square Garden	17,435	2–4–1	5	
8	October 24	Buffalo	6–2		Lundqvist	Madison Square Garden	16,913	3–4–1	7	
9	October 27	Boston	4–7		Georgiev	Madison Square Garden	17,144	3–5–1	7	
10	October 29	Tampa Bay	4–1		Georgiev	Madison Square Garden	17,196	4–5–1	9	

November: 9–4–2, 20 points (Home: 5–1–1; Road: 4–3–1)

Game	Date	Opponent	Score	OT	Decision	Location	Attendance	Record	Points	Recap
11	November 2	@ Nashville	2–1		Georgiev	Bridgestone Arena	17,371	5–5–1	11	
12	November 4	Ottawa	2–6		Georgiev	Madison Square Garden	16,302	5–6–1	11	
13	November 6	Detroit	5–1		Lundqvist	Madison Square Garden	16,804	6–6–1	13	
14	November 7	@ Carolina	4–2		Lundqvist	PNC Arena	13,878	7–6–1	15	
15	November 10	Florida	5–6	SO	Lundqvist	Madison Square Garden	17,464	7–6–2	16	
16	November 12	Pittsburgh	3–2	OT	Georgiev	Madison Square Garden	16,904	8–6–2	18	
17	November 14	@ Tampa Bay	3–9		Georgiev	Amalie Arena	19,092	8–7–2	18	
18	November 16	@ Florida	3–4		Lundqvist	BB&T Center	16,512	8–8–2	18	
19	November 20	Washington	4–1		Lundqvist	Madison Square Garden	17,239	9–8–2	20	
20	November 22	@ Ottawa	1–4		Lundqvist	Canadian Tire Centre	12,349	9–9–2	20	
21	November 23	@ Montreal	6–5		Georgiev	Bell Centre	21,302	10–9–2	22	
22	November 25	Minnesota	3–2	OT	Lundqvist	Madison Square Garden	18,006	11–9–2	24	
23	November 27	Carolina	3–2		Lundqvist	Madison Square Garden	17,269	12–9–2	26	
24	November 29	@ Boston	2–3	OT	Lundqvist	TD Garden	17,850	12–9–3	27	
25	November 30	@ New Jersey	4–0		Georgiev	Prudential Center	16,514	13–9–3	29	

December: 6–7–1, 13 points (Home: 2–4–0; Road: 4–3–1)

Game	Date	Opponent	Score	OT	Decision	Location	Attendance	Record	Points	Recap
26	December 2	Vegas	1–4		Lundqvist	Madison Square Garden	16,325	13–10–3	29	
27	December 5	@ Columbus	3–2		Georgiev	Nationwide Arena	15,785	14–10–3	31	
28	December 6	Montreal	1–2		Georgiev	Madison Square Garden	17,354	14–11–3	31	
29	December 8	@ Vegas	5–0		Georgiev	T-Mobile Arena	18,236	15–11–3	33	
30	December 10	@ Los Angeles	1–3		Lundqvist	Staples Center	17,826	15–12–3	33	
31	December 12	@ San Jose	6–3		Georgiev	SAP Center	16,381	16–12–3	35	
32	December 14	@ Anaheim	3–4	SO	Lundqvist	Honda Center	14,707	16–12–4	36	
33	December 16	Nashville	2–5		Georgiev	Madison Square Garden	17,286	16–13–4	36	
34	December 20	Toronto	3–6		Georgiev	Madison Square Garden	16,909	16–14–4	36	
35	December 22	Anaheim	5–1		Lundqvist	Madison Square Garden	17,465	17–14–4	38	
36	December 23	@ Philadelphia	1–5		Lundqvist	Wells Fargo Center	19,776	17–15–4	38	
37	December 27	Carolina	5–3		Lundqvist	Madison Square Garden	17,498	18–15–4	40	
38	December 28	@ Toronto	5–4	OT	Georgiev	Scotiabank Arena	19,492	19–15–4	42	
39	December 31	@ Edmonton	5–7		Georgiev	Rogers Place	18,347	19–16–4	42	

January: 5–5–0, 10 points (Home: 4–2–0; Road: 1–3–0)

Game	Date	Opponent	Score	OT	Decision	Location	Attendance	Record	Points	Recap
40	January 2	@ Calgary	3–4		Lundqvist	Scotiabank Saddledome	19,038	19–17–4	42	
41	January 4	@ Vancouver	1–2		Georgiev	Rogers Arena	18,871	19–18–4	42	
42	January 7	Colorado	5–3		Shesterkin	Madison Square Garden	17,082	20–18–4	44	
43	January 9	New Jersey	6–3		Shesterkin	Madison Square Garden	17,007	21–18–4	46	
44	January 11	@ St. Louis	2–5		Lundqvist	Enterprise Center	18,096	21–19–4	46	
45	January 13	NY Islanders	6–2		Georgiev	Madison Square Garden	17,403	22–19–4	48	
46	January 16	@ NY Islanders	3–2		Georgiev	Nassau Coliseum	13,917	23–19–4	50	
47	January 19	Columbus	1–2		Shesterkin	Madison Square Garden	17,423	23–20–4	50	
48	January 21	NY Islanders	2–4		Georgiev	Madison Square Garden	17,276	23–21–4	50	
49	January 31	Detroit	4–2		Shesterkin	Madison Square Garden	17,169	24–21–4	52	

February: 11–4–0, 22 points (Home: 3–3–0; Road: 8–1–0)

Game	Date	Opponent	Score	OT	Decision	Location	Attendance	Record	Points	Recap
50	February 1	@ Detroit	1–0		Lundqvist	Little Caesars Arena	19,515	25–21–4	54	
51	February 3	Dallas	3–5		Lundqvist	Madison Square Garden	15,779	25–22–4	54	
52	February 5	Toronto	5–3		Shesterkin	Madison Square Garden	17,123	26–22–4	56	
53	February 7	Buffalo	2–3		Georgiev	Madison Square Garden	17,297	26–23–4	56	
54	February 9	Los Angeles	4–1		Shesterkin	Madison Square Garden	17,237	27–23–4	58	
55	February 11	@ Winnipeg	4–1		Shesterkin	Bell MTS Place	15,325	28–23–4	60	
56	February 13	@ Minnesota	4–3	SO	Georgiev	Xcel Energy Center	17,413	29–23–4	62	
57	February 14	@ Columbus	3–1		Georgiev	Nationwide Arena	18,888	30–23–4	64	
58	February 16	Boston	1–3		Georgiev	Madison Square Garden	18,006	30–24–4	64	
59	February 19	@ Chicago	6–3		Shesterkin	United Center	21,573	31–24–4	66	
60	February 21	@ Carolina	5–2		Shesterkin	PNC Arena	18,680	32–24–4	68	
61	February 22	San Jose	3–2		Shesterkin	Madison Square Garden	18,006	33–24–4	70	
62	February 25	@ NY Islanders	4–3	OT	Georgiev	Nassau Coliseum	13,917	34–24–4	72	
63	February 27	@ Montreal	5–2		Georgiev	Bell Centre	20,946	35–24–4	74	
64	February 28	@ Philadelphia	2–5		Georgiev	Wells Fargo Center	19,581	35–25–4	74	

March: 2–3–1, 5 points (Home: 1–3–0; Road: 1–0–1)

Game	Date	Opponent	Score	OT	Decision	Location	Attendance	Record	Points	Recap
65	March 1	Philadelphia	3–5		Lundqvist	Madison Square Garden	18,006	35–26–4	74	
66	March 3	St. Louis	1–3		Georgiev	Madison Square Garden	16,091	35–27–4	74	
67	March 5	Washington	6–5	OT	Georgiev	Madison Square Garden	17,277	36–27–4	76	
68	March 7	New Jersey	4–6		Shesterkin	Madison Square Garden	17,542	36–28–4	76	
69	March 10	@ Dallas	4–2		Shesterkin	American Airlines Center	18,195	37–28–4	78	
70	March 11	@ Colorado	2–3	OT	Georgiev	Pepsi Center	18,025	37–28–5	79	

Cancelled games

Game	Date	Opponent	Location
71	March 14	@ Arizona	Gila River Arena
72	March 16	Calgary	Madison Square Garden
73	March 18	Pittsburgh	Madison Square Garden
74	March 20	@ Pittsburgh	PPG Paints Arena
75	March 22	@ Buffalo	KeyBank Center
76	March 24	Columbus	Madison Square Garden
77	March 26	@ Washington	Capital One Arena
78	March 28	@ Tampa Bay	Amalie Arena
79	March 30	@ Florida	BB&T Center
80	April 1	Philadelphia	Madison Square Garden
81	April 2	@ Pittsburgh	PPG Paints Arena
82	April 4	Chicago	Madison Square Garden

Win (2 points) Loss (0 points) Overtime/shootout loss (1 point)

=== Playoffs ===
The Rangers faced the Carolina Hurricanes in the qualifying round, and were defeated in three games.

2020 Stanley Cup playoffs
Eastern Conference qualifying round vs. (6) Carolina Hurricanes: Carolina won 3–0

Game	Date	Opponent	Score	OT	Decision	Series	Recap
1	August 1	@ Carolina	2–3		Lundqvist	0–1	
2	August 3	@ Carolina	1–4		Lundqvist	0–2	
3	August 4	Carolina	1–4		Shesterkin	0–3	

Win Loss

== Player statistics ==
As of August 4, 2020

=== Skaters ===
Regular season
Player	GP	G	A	Pts	+/−	PIM
Artemi Panarin	69	32	63	95	+36	20
Mika Zibanejad	57	41	34	75	+9	14
Ryan Strome	70	18	41	59	+21	48
Tony DeAngelo	68	15	38	53	+12	47
Pavel Buchnevich	68	16	30	46	+2	24
Chris Kreider	63	24	21	45	+13	58
Adam Fox	70	8	34	42	+22	32
Jesper Fast	69	12	17	29	+16	20
Jacob Trouba	70	7	20	27	–12	61
Filip Chytil	60	14	9	23	–7	10
Kaapo Kakko	66	10	13	23	–26	14
Brady Skjei^{‡}	60	8	15	23	–6	41
Brett Howden	70	9	10	19	–11	28
Brendan Lemieux	59	6	12	18	–14	111
Ryan Lindgren	60	1	13	14	+16	47
Marc Staal	52	2	9	11	+5	16
Greg McKegg	53	5	4	9	–2	17
Brendan Smith	62	3	5	8	–12	71
Libor Hájek	28	0	5	5	–4	12
Phillip Di Giuseppe	20	1	3	4	+1	2
Julien Gauthier^{†}	12	0	2	2	–1	2
Micheal Haley	22	1	0	1	–7	50
Tim Gettinger	2	0	1	1	+1	0
Lias Andersson	17	0	1	1	–8	4
Vladislav Namestnikov^{‡}	2	0	0	0	–2	2
Steven Fogarty	7	0	0	0	–1	0
Boo Nieves	4	0	0	0	+2	4

Playoffs
Player	GP	G	A	Pts	+/−	PIM
Artemi Panarin	3	1	1	2	–3	0
Mika Zibanejad	3	1	1	2	–1	0
Chris Kreider	3	1	1	2	0	6
Ryan Strome	3	0	2	2	–3	7
Marc Staal	3	1	0	1	–4	0
Jacob Trouba	3	0	1	1	–2	0
Tony DeAngelo	3	0	1	1	–6	16
Ryan Lindgren	3	0	1	1	0	0
Steven Fogarty	1	0	0	0	0	0
Pavel Buchnevich	3	0	0	0	–1	6
Greg McKegg	3	0	0	0	–3	2
Brett Howden	3	0	0	0	–3	4
Jesper Fast	1	0	0	0	–1	0
Brendan Lemieux	1	0	0	0	0	0
Kaapo Kakko	3	0	0	0	–1	0
Filip Chytil	3	0	0	0	–1	2
Julien Gauthier	3	0	0	0	–1	0
Adam Fox	3	0	0	0	+2	2
Phillip Di Giuseppe	3	0	0	0	–3	0
Brendan Smith	3	0	0	0	–1	4

=== Goaltenders ===
Regular season
Player	GP	GS	TOI	W	L	OT	GA	GAA	SA	SV%	SO	G	A	PIM
Alexandar Georgiev	34	32	1,891:44	17	14	2	96	3.04	1,063	.910	2	0	1	0
Igor Shesterkin	12	12	691:35	10	2	0	29	2.52	424	.932	0	0	0	0
Henrik Lundqvist	30	26	1,596:44	10	12	3	84	3.16	883	.905	1	0	1	2

Playoffs
Player	GP	GS	TOI	W	L	GA	GAA	SA	SV%	SO	G	A	PIM
Henrik Lundqvist	2	2	119:09	0	2	7	3.52	71	.901	0	0	0	0
Igor Shesterkin	1	1	58:08	0	1	3	3.10	30	.900	0	0	0	0

- ^{†} Denotes player spent time with another team before joining the Rangers. Stats reflect time with the Rangers only.
- ^{‡} Denotes player was traded mid-season. Stats reflect time with the Rangers only.
- Bold/italics denotes franchise record.

== Awards and honors ==
=== Milestones ===
Regular season
Player	Milestone	Reached
Adam Fox	1st NHL career game	October 3, 2019
Libor Hájek	1st NHL career game	October 3, 2019
Kaapo Kakko	1st NHL career game	October 3, 2019
Kaapo Kakko	1st NHL career goal	October 12, 2019
Ryan Strome	200th NHL career point	October 24, 2019
Adam Fox	1st NHL career point	October 24, 2019
Adam Fox	1st NHL career goal	October 29, 2019
Marc Staal	850th NHL career game	November 6, 2019
Tim Gettinger	1st NHL career point	November 22, 2019
Henrik Lundqvist	1,000th career NHL game	November 27, 2019
Adam Fox	1st NHL career power play goal	November 30, 2019
Filip Chytil	100th NHL career game	November 30, 2019
Igor Shesterkin	1st NHL career game 1st NHL career win	January 7, 2020
Tony DeAngelo	1st NHL career hat trick	January 9, 2020

=== Records ===
Regular season
Player	Record	Reached
Henrik Lundqvist	450th career NHL win (6th all-time)	October 3, 2019
Henrik Lundqvist	454th career NHL win (tied 5th all-time)	November 20, 2019
Henrik Lundqvist	455th career NHL win (5th all-time)	November 25, 2019

== Transactions ==
The Rangers have been involved in the following transactions during the 2019–20 season.

=== Trades ===
Date	Details		Ref
July 1, 2019	To Buffalo Sabres Jimmy Vesey	To New York Rangers 3rd-round pick in 2021	
October 7, 2019	To Ottawa Senators Vladislav Namestnikov	To New York Rangers Nick Ebert; 4th-round pick in 2021	
February 18, 2020	To Carolina Hurricanes Joey Keane	To New York Rangers Julien Gauthier	
February 18, 2020	To Philadelphia Flyers Future considerations	To New York Rangers Jean-François Bérubé	
February 24, 2020	To Carolina Hurricanes Brady Skjei	To New York Rangers Conditional 1st-round pick in 2020	
September 26, 2020	To Detroit Red Wings Marc Staal; 2nd-round pick in 2021	To New York Rangers Future considerations	

=== Free agents ===
Date	Player	Team	Contract term	Ref
July 1, 2019	Chris Bigras	to Philadelphia Flyers	2-year	
July 1, 2019	John Gilmour	to Buffalo Sabres	1-year	
July 1, 2019	Greg McKegg	from Carolina Hurricanes	1-year	
July 1, 2019	Danny O'Regan	from Buffalo Sabres	1-year	
July 1, 2019	Artemi Panarin	from Columbus Blue Jackets	7-year	
July 18, 2019	Phillip Di Giuseppe	from Nashville Predators	1-year	
August 20, 2019	Rob O'Gara	to San Antonio Rampage (AHL)	1-year	
September 17, 2019	Fredrik Claesson	to Carolina Hurricanes	1-year	
October 1, 2019	Micheal Haley	from San Jose Sharks	1-year	
October 25, 2019	Connor Brickley	to Red Bull Salzburg (EBEL)	1-year	
October 5, 2019	Chris Nell	to Greenville Swamp Rabbits (ECHL)	1-year	
October 8, 2019	Brandon Halverson	to Norfolk Admirals (ECHL)	1-year	
October 28, 2019	Vitali Kravtsov	to Traktor Chelyabinsk (KHL)	1-year	
March 10, 2020	Patrick Khodorenko	from Michigan State Spartans (Big Ten)	3-year	
March 20, 2020	Austin Rueschhoff	from Western Michigan Broncos (NCHC)	2-year	
April 2, 2020	Justin Richards	from Minnesota–Duluth Bulldogs (NCHC)	2-year	
June 24, 2020	Nick Ebert	to Örebro HK (SHL)	2-year	

=== Contract terminations ===
Date	Player	Via	Ref
August 1, 2019	Kevin Shattenkirk	Buyout	
December 12, 2019	Ville Meskanen	Mutual termination	
May 31, 2020	Sean Day	Mutual termination	
September 30, 2020	Henrik Lundqvist	Buyout	

=== Signings ===
Date	Player	Contract term	Ref
July 11, 2019	Kaapo Kakko	3-year	
July 11, 2019	Jacob Trouba	7-year	
July 24, 2019	Vinni Lettieri	1-year	
July 26, 2019	Pavel Buchnevich	2-year	
September 11, 2019	Brendan Lemieux	1-year	
September 20, 2019	Tony DeAngelo	1-year	
October 8, 2019	Matthew Robertson	3-year	
February 24, 2020	Chris Kreider	7-year	
March 16, 2020	K'Andre Miller	3-year	
May 8, 2020	Tyler Wall	2-year	
July 31, 2020	Morgan Barron	3-year	

== Draft picks ==
Below are the New York Rangers' selections at the 2019 NHL entry draft, which was held on June 21 and 22, 2019, at Rogers Arena in Vancouver, British Columbia.

Round	#	Player	Pos	Nationality	College/junior/club team
1	2	Kaapo Kakko	RW	Finland	TPS (Liiga)
2	49^{1}	Matthew Robertson	D	Canada	Edmonton Oil Kings (WHL)
2	58^{2}	Karl Henriksson	C	Sweden	Frölunda J20 (J20 SuperElit)
3	68	Zac Jones	D	United States	Tri-City Storm (USHL)
4	112^{3}	Hunter Skinner	D	United States	Lincoln Stars (USHL)
5	130	Leevi Aaltonen	RW	Finland	KalPa U20 (Nuorten SM-liiga)
6	161	Adam Edström	C	Sweden	Mora IK J20 (J20 SuperElit)
7	205^{4}	Eric Ciccolini	RW	Canada	Toronto Jr. Canadiens (OJHL)

1. The Dallas Stars' second-round pick went to the New York Rangers as the result of a trade on February 23, 2019, that sent Mats Zuccarello to Dallas in exchange for a conditional third-round pick in 2020 and this pick (being conditional at the time of the trade).
2. The Tampa Bay Lightning's second-round pick went to the New York Rangers as the result of a trade on February 26, 2018, that sent Ryan McDonagh and J. T. Miller to Tampa Bay in exchange for Vladislav Namestnikov, Libor Hájek, Brett Howden, a first-round pick in 2018 and this pick (being conditional at the time of the trade).
3. The Columbus Blue Jackets' fourth-round pick went to the New York Rangers as the result of a trade on February 25, 2019, that sent Adam McQuaid to Columbus in exchange for Julius Bergman, a seventh-round pick in 2019 and this pick.
4. The Columbus Blue Jackets' seventh-round pick went to the New York Rangers as the result of a trade on February 25, 2019, that sent Adam McQuaid to Columbus in exchange for Julius Bergman, a fourth-round pick in 2019 and this pick.
