= 2019–20 Minnesota Wild season =

Professional ice hockey team season

2019–20 Minnesota Wild
- Division: 6th Central
- Conference: 10th Western
- 2019–20 record: 35–27–7
- Home record: 19–11–5
- Road record: 16–16–2
- Goals for: 220
- Goals against: 220

Team information
- General manager: Bill Guerin
- Coach: Bruce Boudreau (Oct. 3 – Feb. 14); Dean Evason (Feb. 14 – Aug. 7)
- Captain: Mikko Koivu
- Alternate captains: Zach Parise; Ryan Suter
- Arena: Xcel Energy Center
- Average attendance: 17,472
- Minor league affiliates: Iowa Wild (AHL); Allen Americans (ECHL)

Team leaders
- Goals: Zach Parise (25)
- Assists: Ryan Suter (40)
- Points: Kevin Fiala (54)
- Penalty minutes: Ryan Hartman (69)
- Plus/minus: Carson Soucy (+16)
- Wins: Alex Stalock (20)
- Goals against average: Alex Stalock (2.67)

The 2019–20 Minnesota Wild season was the 20th season for the National Hockey League (NHL) franchise that was established on June 25, 1997.

The season was suspended by the league officials on March 12, 2020, after several other professional and collegiate sports organizations followed suit as a result of the ongoing COVID-19 pandemic. On May 26, the NHL regular season was officially declared over with the remaining games being cancelled. The Wild returned to the playoffs after missing them in the 2018–19 season and faced the Vancouver Canucks in the qualifying round, losing in four games.

== Standings ==
=== Divisional standings ===
Central Division
Pos	Team	GP	W	L	OTL	RW	GF	GA	GD	Pts
1	St. Louis Blues	71	42	19	10	33	225	193	+32	94
2	Colorado Avalanche	70	42	20	8	37	237	191	+46	92
3	Dallas Stars	69	37	24	8	26	180	177	+3	82
4	Winnipeg Jets	71	37	28	6	30	216	203	+13	80
5	Nashville Predators	69	35	26	8	28	215	217	−2	78
6	Minnesota Wild	69	35	27	7	30	220	220	0	77
7	Chicago Blackhawks	70	32	30	8	23	212	218	−6	72

Source: National Hockey League

=== Western Conference ===
Pos	Team	GP	W	L	OTL	RW	GF	GA	GD	PCT	Qualification
1	St. Louis Blues	71	42	19	10	33	225	193	+32	.662	Advance to Seeding round-robin tournament
2	Colorado Avalanche	70	42	20	8	37	237	191	+46	.657	Advance to Seeding round-robin tournament
3	Vegas Golden Knights	71	39	24	8	30	227	211	+16	.606	Advance to Seeding round-robin tournament
4	Dallas Stars	69	37	24	8	26	180	177	+3	.594	Advance to Seeding round-robin tournament
5	Edmonton Oilers	71	37	25	9	31	225	217	+8	.585	Advance to 2020 Stanley Cup playoffs qualifying round
6	Nashville Predators	69	35	26	8	28	215	217	−2	.565	Advance to 2020 Stanley Cup playoffs qualifying round
7	Vancouver Canucks	69	36	27	6	27	228	217	+11	.565	Advance to 2020 Stanley Cup playoffs qualifying round
8	Calgary Flames	70	36	27	7	25	210	215	−5	.564	Advance to 2020 Stanley Cup playoffs qualifying round
9	Winnipeg Jets	71	37	28	6	30	216	203	+13	.563	Advance to 2020 Stanley Cup playoffs qualifying round
10	Minnesota Wild	69	35	27	7	30	220	220	0	.558	Advance to 2020 Stanley Cup playoffs qualifying round
11	Arizona Coyotes	70	33	29	8	26	195	187	+8	.529	Advance to 2020 Stanley Cup playoffs qualifying round
12	Chicago Blackhawks	70	32	30	8	23	212	218	−6	.514	Advance to 2020 Stanley Cup playoffs qualifying round
13	Anaheim Ducks	71	29	33	9	20	187	226	−39	.472	
14	Los Angeles Kings	70	29	35	6	21	178	212	−34	.457	
15	San Jose Sharks	70	29	36	5	22	182	226	−44	.450	

Source: National Hockey League

Tiebreaking procedures

1. Fewer number of games played (only used during regular season).
2. Greater number of regulation wins (denoted by RW).
3. Greater number of wins in regulation and overtime (excluding shootout wins; denoted by ROW).
4. Greater number of total wins (including shootouts).
5. Greater number of points earned in head-to-head play; if teams played an uneven number of head-to-head games, the result of the first game on the home ice of the team with the extra home game is discarded.
6. Greater goal differential (difference between goals for and goals against).
7. Greater number of goals scored (denoted by GF).

== Schedule and results ==
=== Preseason ===
The preseason schedule was published on June 13, 2019.

2019 preseason game log: 2–1–3 (Home: 1–0–2; Road: 1–1–1)
#	Date	Visitor	Score	Home	OT	Decision	Attendance	Record	Recap
1	September 17	Dallas	2–1	Minnesota	OT	Stalock	13,537	0–0–1
2	September 18	Minnesota	1–4	Winnipeg		Kahkonen	15,321	0–1–1
3	September 21	Colorado	3–4	Minnesota		Dubnyk	16,833	1–1–1
4	September 22	Minnesota	2–3	Colorado	SO	Stalock	—	1–1–2
5	September 26	Minnesota	2–1	Dallas		Dubnyk	12,036	2–1–2
6	September 29	Winnipeg	5–4	Minnesota	OT	Dubnyk	17,017	2–1–3

=== Regular season ===
The regular season schedule was published on June 25, 2019.

2019–20 game log: 35–27–7 (Home: 19–11–5; Away: 16–16–2)

October: 4–9–0 (Home: 3–1–0; Road: 1–8–0)
#	Date	Visitor	Score	Home	OT	Decision	Attendance	Record	Pts	Recap
1	October 3	Minnesota	2–5	Nashville		Dubnyk	17,455	0–1–0	0
2	October 5	Minnesota	2–4	Colorado		Dubnyk	17,090	0–2–0	0
3	October 10	Minnesota	2–5	Winnipeg		Dubnyk	15,325	0–3–0	0
4	October 12	Pittsburgh	7–4	Minnesota		Dubnyk	19,157	0–4–0	0
5	October 14	Minnesota	2–0	Ottawa		Stalock	11,500	1–4–0	2
6	October 15	Minnesota	2–4	Toronto		Dubnyk	19,149	1–5–0	2
7	October 17	Minnesota	0–4	Montreal		Stalock	20,419	1–6–0	2
8	October 20	Montreal	3–4	Minnesota		Dubnyk	17,344	2–6–0	4
9	October 22	Edmonton	0–3	Minnesota		Dubnyk	17,189	3–6–0	6
10	October 24	Minnesota	0–4	Nashville		Stalock	17,386	3–7–0	6
11	October 26	Los Angeles	1–5	Minnesota		Stalock	17,444	4–7–0	8
12	October 29	Minnesota	3–6	Dallas		Stalock	17,756	4–8–0	8
13	October 30	Minnesota	1–2	St. Louis		Dubnyk	18,096	4–9–0	8

November: 7–2–4 (Home: 3–0–2; Road: 4–2–2)
#	Date	Visitor	Score	Home	OT	Decision	Attendance	Record	Pts	Recap
14	November 2	St. Louis	4–3	Minnesota	OT	Dubnyk	18,208	4–9–1	9
15	November 5	Minnesota	4–2	Anaheim		Stalock	15,526	5–9–1	11
16	November 7	Minnesota	5–6	San Jose		Dubnyk	15,764	5–10–1	11
17	November 9	Minnesota	4–3	Arizona		Dubnyk	14,428	6–10–1	13
18	November 12	Minnesota	1–3	Los Angeles		Dubnyk	16,099	6–11–1	13
19	November 14	Arizona	2–3	Minnesota		Dubnyk	17,079	7–11–1	15
20	November 16	Carolina	4–3	Minnesota	OT	Dubnyk	17,101	7–11–2	16
21	November 19	Minnesota	4–1	Buffalo		Stalock	15,522	8–11–2	18
22	November 21	Colorado	2–3	Minnesota		Stalock	17,574	9–11–2	20
23	November 23	Minnesota	4–5	Boston	OT	Stalock	17,850	9–11–3	21
24	November 25	Minnesota	2–3	NY Rangers	OT	Stalock	18,006	9–11–4	22
25	November 26	Minnesota	3–2	New Jersey		Kähkönen	14,627	10–11–4	24
26	November 29	Ottawa	2–7	Minnesota		Stalock	17,112	11–11–4	26

December: 8–6–1 (Home: 4–3–1; Road: 4–3–0)
#	Date	Visitor	Score	Home	OT	Decision	Attendance	Record	Pts	Recap
27	December 1	Dallas	2–3	Minnesota	SO	Stalock	17,096	12–11–4	28
28	December 3	Minnesota	4–2	Florida		Kähkönen	10,167	13–11–4	30
29	December 5	Minnesota	5–4	Tampa Bay		Stalock	19,092	14–11–4	32
30	December 7	Minnesota	2–6	Carolina		Stalock	18,680	14–12–4	32
31	December 10	Anaheim	3–2	Minnesota	SO	Kähkönen	17,154	14–12–5	33
32	December 12	Edmonton	5–6	Minnesota		Kähkönen	17,271	15–12–5	35
33	December 14	Philadelphia	1–4	Minnesota		Stalock	17,140	16–12–5	37
34	December 15	Minnesota	3–5	Chicago		Kähkönen	21,513	16–13–5	37
35	December 17	Minnesota	2–3	Vegas		Stalock	18,220	16–14–5	37
36	December 19	Minnesota	8–5	Arizona		Dubnyk	15,582	17–14–5	39
37	December 21	Winnipeg	6–0	Minnesota		Stalock	17,319	17–15–5	39
38	December 23	Calgary	0–3	Minnesota		Dubnyk	17,596	18–15–5	41
39	December 27	Minnesota	6–4	Colorado		Dubnyk	18,146	19–15–5	43
40	December 29	NY Islanders	3–1	Minnesota		Dubnyk	17,506	19–16–5	43
41	December 31	Toronto	4–1	Minnesota		Dubnyk	18,164	19–17–5	43

January: 4–4–1 (Home: 4–2–1; Road: 0–2–0)
#	Date	Visitor	Score	Home	OT	Decision	Attendance	Record	Pts	Recap
42	January 4	Winnipeg	2–3	Minnesota	OT	Dubnyk	17,271	20–17–5	45
43	January 5	Calgary	5–4	Minnesota	SO	Stalock	17,204	20–17–6	46
44	January 9	Minnesota	1–2	Calgary		Stalock	18,634	20–18–6	46
45	January 12	Vancouver	4–1	Minnesota		Dubnyk	17,348	20–19–6	46
46	January 14	Minnesota	3–7	Pittsburgh		Dubnyk	18,545	20–20–6	46
47	January 16	Tampa Bay	2–3	Minnesota		Stalock	17,305	21–20–6	48
48	January 18	Dallas	0–7	Minnesota		Stalock	18,219	22–20–6	50
49	January 20	Florida	5–4	Minnesota		Stalock	17,255	22–21–6	50
50	January 22	Detroit	2–4	Minnesota		Dubnyk	17,212	23–21–6	52

February: 9–4–1 (Home: 4–4–1; Road: 5–0–0)
#	Date	Visitor	Score	Home	OT	Decision	Attendance	Record	Pts	Recap
51	February 1	Boston	6–1	Minnesota		Dubnyk	18,009	23–22–6	52
52	February 4	Chicago	2–3	Minnesota	OT	Stalock	17,341	24–22–6	54
53	February 6	Vancouver	2–4	Minnesota		Stalock	17,191	25–22–6	56
54	February 7	Minnesota	3–2	Dallas		Dubnyk	18,532	26–22–6	58
55	February 9	Colorado	3–2	Minnesota		Dubnyk	17,444	26–23–6	58
56	February 11	Vegas	0–4	Minnesota		Stalock	17,112	27–23–6	60
57	February 13	NY Rangers	4–3	Minnesota	SO	Stalock	17,413	27–23–7	61
58	February 15	San Jose	2–0	Minnesota		Stalock	18,611	27–24–7	61
59	February 19	Minnesota	4–3	Vancouver	SO	Dubnyk	18,871	28–24–7	63
60	February 21	Minnesota	5–3	Edmonton		Stalock	17,055	29–24–7	65
61	February 23	St. Louis	4–1	Minnesota		Dubnyk	17,266	29–25–7	65
62	February 25	Columbus	4–5	Minnesota		Stalock	17,057	30–25–7	67
63	February 27	Minnesota	7–1	Detroit		Stalock	17,663	31–25–7	69
64	February 28	Minnesota	5–0	Columbus		Stalock	18,955	32–25–7	71

March: 3–2–0 (Home: 1–1–0; Road: 2–1–0)
#	Date	Visitor	Score	Home	OT	Decision	Attendance	Record	Pts	Recap
65	March 1	Washington	4–3	Minnesota		Stalock	17,388	32–26–7	71
66	March 3	Nashville	1–3	Minnesota		Stalock	17,242	33–26–7	73
67	March 5	Minnesota	3–2	San Jose		Stalock	14,517	34–26–7	75
68	March 7	Minnesota	3–7	Los Angeles		Stalock	16,082	34–27–7	75
69	March 8	Minnesota	5–4	Anaheim	OT	Dubnyk	15,948	35–27–7	77

Cancelled games
#	Date	Visitor	Home
70	March 12	Vegas	Minnesota
71	March 14	Minnesota	Philadelphia
72	March 15	Nashville	Minnesota
73	March 17	Chicago	Minnesota
74	March 19	Minnesota	Chicago
75	March 20	Minnesota	Winnipeg
76	March 23	Colorado	Minnesota
77	March 26	New Jersey	Minnesota
78	March 28	Buffalo	Minnesota
79	March 29	Minnesota	St. Louis
80	March 31	Minnesota	NY Islanders
81	April 2	Minnesota	Washington
82	April 4	Minnesota	Nashville

Legend: Win (2 points) Loss (0 points) Overtime/shootout loss (1 point)

=== Playoffs ===
The Wild were defeated by the Vancouver Canucks in the qualifying round in four games.

2020 Stanley Cup playoffs

Western Conference Qualifying Round vs. (7) Vancouver Canucks: Vancouver won 3–1
#	Date	Visitor	Score	Home	OT	Decision	Series	Recap
1	August 2	Minnesota	3–0	Vancouver		Stalock	1–0
2	August 4	Minnesota	3–4	Vancouver		Stalock	1–1
3	August 6	Vancouver	3–0	Minnesota		Stalock	1–2
4	August 7	Vancouver	5–4	Minnesota	OT	Stalock	1–3

Legend: Win Loss

== Player statistics ==
=== Skaters ===
Regular season
Player	GP	G	A	Pts	+/−	PIM
Kevin Fiala	64	23	31	54	−1	42
Ryan Suter	69	8	40	48	−6	12
Eric Staal	66	19	28	47	−9	28
Zach Parise	69	25	21	46	−11	8
Mats Zuccarello	65	15	22	37	−9	18
Jared Spurgeon	62	12	20	32	−1	18
Luke Kunin	63	15	16	31	−10	55
Jason Zucker^{‡}	45	14	15	29	−3	19
Joel Eriksson Ek	62	8	21	29	7	22
Jordan Greenway	67	8	20	28	2	54
Jonas Brodin	69	2	26	28	15	24
Marcus Foligno	59	11	14	25	8	30
Mathew Dumba	69	6	18	24	−7	41
Ryan Donato	62	14	9	23	5	12
Mikko Koivu	55	4	17	21	2	28
Ryan Hartman	69	9	11	20	4	69
Brad Hunt	59	8	11	19	−7	6
Carson Soucy	55	7	7	14	16	18
Victor Rask	43	5	8	13	7	6
Alex Galchenyuk^{†}	14	3	4	7	2	6
Greg Pateryn	20	0	3	3	1	6
Gerald Mayhew	13	2	0	2	4	2
Nico Sturm	6	0	2	2	2	0
Brennan Menell	5	0	0	0	1	2
Nick Seeler	6	0	0	0	−6	8
Gabriel Dumont	3	0	0	0	−1	0
Luke Johnson	3	0	0	0	−3	0

Playoffs
Player	GP	G	A	Pts	+/−	PIM
Eric Staal	4	1	4	5	0	2
Kevin Fiala	4	3	1	4	1	10
Jared Spurgeon	4	2	2	4	−1	4
Zach Parise	4	0	3	3	2	2
Luke Kunin	4	2	0	2	0	2
Jonas Brodin	4	0	2	2	1	0
Nico Sturm	2	1	0	1	−1	0
Joel Eriksson Ek	4	1	0	1	1	2
Ryan Suter	3	0	1	1	1	0
Marcus Foligno	4	0	1	1	−2	5
Mats Zuccarello	4	0	1	1	−1	0
Mathew Dumba	4	0	1	1	1	2
Matt Bartkowski	1	0	0	0	0	0
Jordan Greenway	4	0	0	0	−1	8
Ryan Hartman	4	0	0	0	0	9
Carson Soucy	4	0	0	0	−3	0
Alex Galchenyuk	4	0	0	0	−2	4
Brad Hunt	4	0	0	0	−1	2
Mikko Koivu	4	0	0	0	0	6
Ryan Donato	2	0	0	0	1	2

=== Goaltenders ===
Regular season
Player	GP	GS	TOI	W	L	OT	GA	GAA	SA	SV%	SO	G	A	PIM
Alex Stalock	38	36	2,177:21	20	11	4	97	2.67	1,082	.910	4	0	1	4
Devan Dubnyk	30	28	1,664:39	12	15	2	93	3.35	849	.890	1	0	0	2
Kaapo Kahkonen	5	5	304:12	3	1	1	15	2.96	172	.913	0	0	0	0

Playoffs
Player	GP	GS	TOI	W	L	GA	GAA	SA	SV%	SO	G	A	PIM
Alex Stalock	4	4	237:14	1	3	12	3.03	116	.897	1	0	0	0

^{†}Denotes player spent time with another team before joining the Wild. Stats reflect time with the Wild only.
^{‡}Denotes player was traded mid-season. Stats reflect time with the Wild only.
Bold/italics denotes franchise record.
