= 2019–20 Carolina Hurricanes season =

Season of play of professional ice hockey team

2019–20 Carolina Hurricanes
- Division: 4th Metropolitan
- Conference: 6th Eastern
- 2019–20 record: 38–25–5
- Home record: 19–12–2
- Road record: 19–13–3
- Goals for: 222
- Goals against: 193

Team information
- General manager: Don Waddell
- Coach: Rod Brind'Amour
- Captain: Jordan Staal
- Alternate captains: Jordan Martinook; Jaccob Slavin
- Arena: PNC Arena
- Average attendance: 16,905
- Minor league affiliates: Charlotte Checkers (AHL); Greenville Swamp Rabbits (ECHL)

Team leaders
- Goals: Sebastian Aho (38)
- Assists: Teuvo Teravainen (48)
- Points: Sebastian Aho (66)
- Penalty minutes: Joel Edmundson (72)
- Plus/minus: Dougie Hamilton; Jaccob Slavin (+30)
- Wins: Petr Mrazek (21)
- Goals against average: James Reimer (2.66)

The 2019–20 Carolina Hurricanes season was the 41st season for the National Hockey League (NHL) franchise that was established on June 22, 1979 (following seven seasons of play in the World Hockey Association), and 22nd season since the franchise relocated from Hartford to start the 1997–98 NHL season.

The season was suspended by the league officials on March 12, 2020, after several other professional and collegiate sports organizations followed suit as a result of the ongoing COVID-19 pandemic. On May 26, the NHL regular season was officially declared over with the remaining games being cancelled. The Hurricanes advanced to the playoffs where they defeated the New York Rangers in a three-game sweep in the Qualifying Round, but were defeated in the First Round by the Boston Bruins in five games.

== Standings ==
=== Divisional standings ===
Metropolitan Division
Pos	Team	GP	W	L	OTL	RW	GF	GA	GD	Pts
1	Washington Capitals	69	41	20	8	31	240	215	+25	90
2	Philadelphia Flyers	69	41	21	7	31	232	196	+36	89
3	Pittsburgh Penguins	69	40	23	6	29	224	196	+28	86
4	Carolina Hurricanes	68	38	25	5	27	222	193	+29	81
5	Columbus Blue Jackets	70	33	22	15	25	180	187	−7	81
6	New York Islanders	68	35	23	10	24	192	193	−1	80
7	New York Rangers	70	37	28	5	31	234	222	+12	79
8	New Jersey Devils	69	28	29	12	22	189	230	−41	68

Source: National Hockey League

=== Eastern Conference ===
Pos	Team	GP	W	L	OTL	RW	GF	GA	GD	PCT	Qualification
1	Boston Bruins	70	44	14	12	38	227	174	+53	.714	Advance to Seeding round-robin tournament
2	Tampa Bay Lightning	70	43	21	6	35	245	195	+50	.657	Advance to Seeding round-robin tournament
3	Washington Capitals	69	41	20	8	31	240	215	+25	.652	Advance to Seeding round-robin tournament
4	Philadelphia Flyers	69	41	21	7	31	232	196	+36	.645	Advance to Seeding round-robin tournament
5	Pittsburgh Penguins	69	40	23	6	29	224	196	+28	.623	Advance to 2020 Stanley Cup playoffs qualifying round
6	Carolina Hurricanes	68	38	25	5	27	222	193	+29	.596	Advance to 2020 Stanley Cup playoffs qualifying round
7	New York Islanders	68	35	23	10	24	192	193	−1	.588	Advance to 2020 Stanley Cup playoffs qualifying round
8	Toronto Maple Leafs	70	36	25	9	28	238	227	+11	.579	Advance to 2020 Stanley Cup playoffs qualifying round
9	Columbus Blue Jackets	70	33	22	15	25	180	187	−7	.579	Advance to 2020 Stanley Cup playoffs qualifying round
10	Florida Panthers	69	35	26	8	30	231	228	+3	.565	Advance to 2020 Stanley Cup playoffs qualifying round
11	New York Rangers	70	37	28	5	31	234	222	+12	.564	Advance to 2020 Stanley Cup playoffs qualifying round
12	Montreal Canadiens	71	31	31	9	19	212	221	−9	.500	Advance to 2020 Stanley Cup playoffs qualifying round
13	Buffalo Sabres	69	30	31	8	22	195	217	−22	.493	
14	New Jersey Devils	69	28	29	12	22	189	230	−41	.493	
15	Ottawa Senators	71	25	34	12	18	191	243	−52	.437	
16	Detroit Red Wings	71	17	49	5	13	145	267	−122	.275	

Source: National Hockey League

== Schedule and results ==
=== Preseason ===
The preseason schedule was published on June 12, 2019.

2019 preseason game log: 2–3–1 (Home: 1–1–1; Road: 1–2–0)
#	Date	Visitor	Score	Home	OT	Decision	Attendance	Record	Recap
1	September 17	Carolina	3–0	Tampa Bay		Reimer	12,010	1–0–0
2	September 18	Tampa Bay	0–2	Carolina		Mrazek	—	2–0–0
3	September 21	Carolina	2–3	Washington		Reimer	14,603	2–1–0
4	September 25	Carolina	0–3	Nashville		Forsberg	17,159	2–2–0
5	September 27	Nashville	2–1	Carolina	OT	Reimer	11,212	2–2–1
6	September 29	Washington	4–3	Carolina		Mrazek	18,680	2–3–1

=== Regular season ===
The regular season schedule was published on June 25, 2019.

2019–20 game log

October: 8–3–1 (Home: 5–1–0; Road: 3–2–1)
#	Date	Visitor	Score	Home	OT	Decision	Attendance	Record	Pts	Recap
1	October 3	Montreal	3–4	Carolina	SO	Mrazek	18,680	1–0–0	2
2	October 5	Carolina	3–2	Washington	OT	Reimer	18,506	2–0–0	4
3	October 6	Tampa Bay	3–4	Carolina	OT	Mrazek	14,125	3–0–0	6
4	October 8	Carolina	6–3	Florida		Reimer	11,638	4–0–0	8
5	October 11	NY Islanders	2–5	Carolina		Mrazek	14,875	5–0–0	10
6	October 12	Columbus	3–2	Carolina		Reimer	16,224	5–1–0	10
7	October 15	Carolina	2–0	Los Angeles		Mrazek	14,219	6–1–0	12
8	October 16	Carolina	2–5	San Jose		Reimer	15,143	6–2–0	12
9	October 18	Carolina	2–4	Anaheim		Mrazek	14,755	6–3–0	12
10	October 24	Carolina	3–4	Columbus	OT	Mrazek	15,398	6–3–1	13
11	October 26	Chicago	0–4	Carolina		Mrazek	15,738	7–3–1	15
12	October 29	Calgary	1–2	Carolina		Mrazek	13,864	8–3–1	17

November: 8–7–0 (Home: 3–4–0; Road: 5–3–0)
#	Date	Visitor	Score	Home	OT	Decision	Attendance	Record	Pts	Recap
13	November 1	Detroit	3–7	Carolina		Mrazek	15,383	9–3–1	19
14	November 2	New Jersey	5–3	Carolina		Reimer	15,079	9–4–1	19
15	November 5	Carolina	1–4	Philadelphia		Mrazek	16,172	9–5–1	19
16	November 7	NY Rangers	4–2	Carolina		Mrazek	13,878	9–6–1	19
17	November 9	Carolina	1–4	Ottawa		Reimer	12,276	9–7–1	19
18	November 11	Ottawa	2–8	Carolina		Mrazek	12,356	10–7–1	21
19	November 14	Carolina	5–4	Buffalo	OT	Mrazek	16,603	11–7–1	23
20	November 16	Carolina	4–3	Minnesota	OT	Reimer	17,101	12–7–1	25
21	November 19	Carolina	4–2	Chicago		Mrazek	21,325	13–7–1	27
22	November 21	Philadelphia	5–3	Carolina		Mrazek	14,734	13–8–1	27
23	November 23	Florida	2–4	Carolina		Mrazek	18,159	14–8–1	29
24	November 24	Carolina	2–0	Detroit		Reimer	18,726	15–8–1	31
25	November 27	Carolina	2–3	NY Rangers		Mrazek	17,269	15–9–1	31
26	November 29	Nashville	3–0	Carolina		Mrazek	18,680	15–10–1	31
27	November 30	Carolina	3–2	Tampa Bay		Reimer	19,092	16–10–1	33

December: 8–4–1 (Home: 4–1–0; Road: 4–3–1)
#	Date	Visitor	Score	Home	OT	Decision	Attendance	Record	Pts	Recap
28	December 3	Carolina	0–2	Boston		Reimer	17,850	16–11–1	33
29	December 5	San Jose	2–3	Carolina	SO	Mrazek	14,275	17–11–1	35
30	December 7	Minnesota	2–6	Carolina		Mrazek	18,680	18–11–1	37
31	December 10	Carolina	6–3	Edmonton		Reimer	16,175	19–11–1	39
32	December 12	Carolina	0–1	Vancouver	OT	Mrazek	18,626	19–11–2	40
33	December 14	Carolina	4–0	Calgary		Reimer	18,853	20–11–2	42
34	December 17	Carolina	6–3	Winnipeg		Mrazek	15,325	21–11–2	44
35	December 19	Carolina	3–1	Colorado		Reimer	18,015	22–11–2	46
36	December 21	Florida	4–2	Carolina		Mrazek	18,224	22–12–2	46
37	December 23	Carolina	6–8	Toronto		Mrazek	19,176	22–13–2	46
38	December 27	Carolina	3–5	NY Rangers		Reimer	17,498	22–14–2	46
39	December 28	Washington	4–6	Carolina		Mrazek	18,680	23–14–2	48
40	December 31	Montreal	1–3	Carolina		Mrazek	18,680	24–14–2	50

January: 5–5–1 (Home: 5–3–1; Road: 0–2–0)
#	Date	Visitor	Score	Home	OT	Decision	Attendance	Record	Pts	Recap
41	January 3	Washington	4–3	Carolina		Mrazek	18,680	24–15–2	50
42	January 5	Tampa Bay	3–1	Carolina		Mrazek	18,015	24–16–2	50
43	January 7	Philadelphia	4–5	Carolina	OT	Reimer	15,072	25–16–2	52
44	January 10	Arizona	0–3	Carolina		Mrazek	16,476	26–16–2	54
45	January 11	Los Angeles	0–2	Carolina		Reimer	18,680	27–16–2	56
46	January 13	Carolina	0–2	Washington		Mrazek	18,573	27–17–2	56
47	January 16	Carolina	2–3	Columbus		Mrazek	17,900	27–18–2	56
48	January 17	Anaheim	2–1	Carolina	OT	Reimer	16,913	27–18–3	57
49	January 19	NY Islanders	1–2	Carolina	SO	Reimer	18,680	28–18–3	59
50	January 21	Winnipeg	1–4	Carolina		Mrazek	14,607	29–18–3	61
51	January 31	Vegas	4–3	Carolina		Mrazek	18,150	29–19–3	61

February: 6–5–2 (Home: 2–3–1; Road: 4–2–1)
#	Date	Visitor	Score	Home	OT	Decision	Attendance	Record	Pts	Recap
52	February 2	Vancouver	3–4	Carolina	SO	Reimer	15,767	30–19–3	63
53	February 4	Carolina	3–6	St. Louis		Mrazek	18,096	30–20–3	63
54	February 6	Carolina	5–3	Arizona		Reimer	11,632	31–20–3	65
55	February 8	Carolina	6–5	Vegas	SO	Reimer	18,417	32–20–3	67
56	February 11	Carolina	1–4	Dallas		Mrazek	18,532	32–21–3	67
57	February 14	New Jersey	2–5	Carolina		Mrazek	18,680	33–21–3	69
58	February 16	Edmonton	4–3	Carolina	OT	Reimer	18,680	33–21–4	70
59	February 18	Carolina	4–1	Nashville		Mrazek	17,204	34–21–4	72
60	February 21	NY Rangers	5–2	Carolina		Mrazek	18,680	34–22–4	72
61	February 22	Carolina	6–3	Toronto		Ayres	19,414	35–22–4	74
62	February 25	Dallas	4–1	Carolina		Nedeljkovic	18,176	35–23–4	74
63	February 28	Colorado	3–2	Carolina		Forsberg	18,680	35–24–4	74
64	February 29	Carolina	3–4	Montreal	OT	Nedeljkovic	21,207	35–24–5	75

March: 3–1–0 (Home: 0–0–0; Road: 3–1–0)
#	Date	Visitor	Score	Home	OT	Decision	Attendance	Record	Pts	Recap
65	March 5	Carolina	1–4	Philadelphia		Nedeljkovic	18,900	35–25–5	75
66	March 7	Carolina	3–2	NY Islanders	OT	Forsberg	13,917	36–25–5	77
67	March 8	Carolina	6–2	Pittsburgh		Nedeljkovic	18,548	37–25–5	79
68	March 10	Carolina	5–2	Detroit		Mrazek	17,511	38–25–5	81

Cancelled games
#	Date	Visitor	Home
69	March 12	Carolina	New Jersey
70	March 14	Pittsburgh	Carolina
71	March 15	Carolina	Buffalo
72	March 17	Buffalo	Carolina
73	March 19	St. Louis	Carolina
74	March 21	Ottawa	Carolina
75	March 22	Carolina	NY Islanders
76	March 24	Carolina	Pittsburgh
77	March 26	Toronto	Carolina
78	March 28	Pittsburgh	Carolina
79	March 29	Carolina	New Jersey
80	March 31	Boston	Carolina
81	April 3	Columbus	Carolina
82	April 4	Carolina	Boston

Legend: Win (2 points) Loss (0 points) Overtime/shootout loss (1 point)

=== Playoffs ===
The Hurricanes faced the New York Rangers in the qualifying round, and defeated them in three games.

The Hurricanes faced the Boston Bruins in the first round, where they were defeated in five games.

2020 Stanley Cup playoffs

Eastern Conference Qualifying Round vs. (11) New York Rangers: Carolina won 3–0
#	Date	Visitor	Score	Home	OT	Decision	Series	Recap
1	August 1	NY Rangers	2–3	Carolina		Mrazek	1–0
2	August 3	NY Rangers	1–4	Carolina		Mrazek	2–0
3	August 4	Carolina	4–1	NY Rangers		Reimer	3–0

Eastern Conference First Round vs. (4) Boston Bruins: Boston won 4–1
#	Date	Visitor	Score	Home	OT	Decision	Series	Recap
1	August 12	Carolina	3–4	Boston	2OT	Mrazek	0–1
2	August 13	Carolina	3–2	Boston		Reimer	1–1
3	August 15	Boston	3–1	Carolina		Mrazek	1–2
4	August 17	Boston	4–3	Carolina		Reimer	1–3
5	August 19	Carolina	1–2	Boston		Mrazek	1–4

Legend: Win Loss

== Player statistics ==
=== Skaters ===
Regular season
Player	GP	G	A	Pts	+/−	PIM
Sebastian Aho	68	38	28	66	10	26
Teuvo Teravainen	68	15	48	63	20	8
Andrei Svechnikov	68	24	37	61	9	54
Dougie Hamilton	47	14	26	40	30	32
Martin Necas	64	16	20	36	−6	20
Jaccob Slavin	68	6	30	36	30	10
Warren Foegele	68	13	17	30	9	34
Nino Niederreiter	67	11	18	29	−3	42
Ryan Dzingel	64	8	21	29	3	30
Jordan Staal	68	8	19	27	3	40
Jake Gardiner	68	4	20	24	−24	30
Lucas Wallmark^{‡}	60	11	12	23	0	18
Erik Haula^{‡}	41	12	10	22	1	20
Joel Edmundson	68	7	13	20	7	72
Brett Pesce	61	4	14	18	7	27
Brock McGinn	68	7	10	17	−4	17
Haydn Fleury	45	4	10	14	−2	8
Jordan Martinook	45	2	11	13	−2	22
Justin Williams	20	8	3	11	2	6
Trevor van Riemsdyk	49	1	7	8	−7	10
Morgan Geekie	2	3	1	4	3	2
Vincent Trocheck^{†}	7	1	1	2	−5	16
Brady Skjei^{†}	7	0	1	1	−4	4
Clark Bishop	5	0	1	1	−2	4
Julien Gauthier^{‡}	5	0	1	1	2	6
Eetu Luostarinen^{‡}	8	0	1	1	−2	0
Brian Gibbons	15	0	0	0	−7	4

Playoffs
Player	GP	G	A	Pts	+/−	PIM
Sebastian Aho	8	3	9	12	6	4
Andrei Svechnikov	6	4	3	7	7	8
Teuvo Teravainen	8	3	2	5	6	4
Martin Necas	8	1	3	4	0	0
Jordan Martinook	8	2	1	3	0	8
Sami Vatanen	7	0	3	3	−1	6
Haydn Fleury	8	2	0	2	4	6
Brock McGinn	8	1	1	2	0	2
Nino Niederreiter	7	1	1	2	−6	2
Jaccob Slavin	8	1	1	2	−2	0
Dougie Hamilton	5	1	1	2	−2	4
Brady Skjei	8	0	2	2	6	4
Vincent Trocheck	8	0	2	2	4	4
Joel Edmundson	4	1	0	1	4	2
Warren Foegele	8	1	0	1	−1	2
Justin Williams	7	1	0	1	0	9
Morgan Geekie	8	0	1	1	−1	0
Trevor van Riemsdyk	2	0	1	1	1	4
Jake Gardiner	6	0	1	1	0	2
Jordan Staal	8	0	0	0	−2	4
Ryan Dzingel	4	0	0	0	0	2

=== Goaltenders ===
Regular season
Player	GP	GS	TOI	W	L	OT	GA	GAA	SA	SV%	SO	G	A	PIM
Petr Mrazek	40	38	2,320:59	21	16	2	104	2.69	1,091	.905	3	0	0	4
James Reimer	25	24	1,378:01	14	6	2	61	2.66	712	.914	3	0	0	2
Anton Forsberg	3	3	143:09	1	1	0	8	3.35	78	.897	0	0	0	0
Alex Nedeljkovic	4	3	216:19	1	2	1	11	3.05	97	.887	0	0	0	0
David Ayres	1	0	28:41	1	0	0	2	4.18	10	.800	0	0	0	0

Playoffs
Player	GP	GS	TOI	W	L	GA	GAA	SA	SV%	SO	G	A	PIM
James Reimer	3	3	178:05	2	1	7	2.36	106	.934	0	0	0	0
Petr Mrazek	5	5	316:36	2	3	11	2.08	155	.929	0	0	0	0

^{†}Denotes player spent time with another team before joining the Hurricanes. Stats reflect time with the Hurricanes only.
^{‡}Denotes player was traded mid-season. Stats reflect time with the Hurricanes only.
Bold/italics denotes franchise record.
