= 2019–20 Columbus Blue Jackets season =

National Hockey League season

2019–20 Columbus Blue Jackets
- Division: 6th Metropolitan
- Conference: 9th Eastern
- 2019–20 record: 33–22–15
- Home record: 20–12–4
- Road record: 13–10–11
- Goals for: 180
- Goals against: 187

Team information
- General manager: Jarmo Kekäläinen
- Coach: John Tortorella
- Captain: Nick Foligno
- Alternate captains: Cam Atkinson; Boone Jenner; Seth Jones
- Arena: Nationwide Arena
- Average attendance: 16,898
- Minor league affiliate: Cleveland Monsters (AHL)

Team leaders
- Goals: Oliver Bjorkstrand (21)
- Assists: Pierre-Luc Dubois (31)
- Points: Pierre-Luc Dubois (49)
- Penalty minutes: Nick Foligno (62)
- Plus/minus: Seth Jones; Eric Robinson (+10)
- Wins: Joonas Korpisalo (19)
- Goals against average: Elvis Merzlikins (2.35)

The 2019–20 Columbus Blue Jackets season was the 20th season for the National Hockey League (NHL) franchise that was established on June 25, 1997.

The season was suspended by the league officials on March 12, 2020, after several other professional and collegiate sports organizations followed suit as a result of the ongoing COVID-19 pandemic. On May 26, the NHL regular season was officially declared over with the remaining games being cancelled.

The Blue Jackets advanced to the playoffs and defeated the Toronto Maple Leafs in the qualifying round, but were defeated in the first round by the Tampa Bay Lightning in five games.

As of the 2025–26 season, this is the most recent time the Blue Jackets qualified for the playoffs.

== Standings ==
=== Divisional standings ===
Metropolitan Division
| Pos | Team | GP | W | L | OTL | RW | GF | GA | GD | Pts |
|---|---|---|---|---|---|---|---|---|---|---|
| 1 | Washington Capitals | 69 | 41 | 20 | 8 | 31 | 240 | 215 | +25 | 90 |
| 2 | Philadelphia Flyers | 69 | 41 | 21 | 7 | 31 | 232 | 196 | +36 | 89 |
| 3 | Pittsburgh Penguins | 69 | 40 | 23 | 6 | 29 | 224 | 196 | +28 | 86 |
| 4 | Carolina Hurricanes | 68 | 38 | 25 | 5 | 27 | 222 | 193 | +29 | 81 |
| 5 | Columbus Blue Jackets | 70 | 33 | 22 | 15 | 25 | 180 | 187 | −7 | 81 |
| 6 | New York Islanders | 68 | 35 | 23 | 10 | 24 | 192 | 193 | −1 | 80 |
| 7 | New York Rangers | 70 | 37 | 28 | 5 | 31 | 234 | 222 | +12 | 79 |
| 8 | New Jersey Devils | 69 | 28 | 29 | 12 | 22 | 189 | 230 | −41 | 68 |

Source: National Hockey League

=== Eastern Conference ===
| Pos | Team | GP | W | L | OTL | RW | GF | GA | GD | PCT | Qualification |
|---|---|---|---|---|---|---|---|---|---|---|---|
| 1 | Boston Bruins | 70 | 44 | 14 | 12 | 38 | 227 | 174 | +53 | .714 | Advance to Seeding round-robin tournament |
| 2 | Tampa Bay Lightning | 70 | 43 | 21 | 6 | 35 | 245 | 195 | +50 | .657 | Advance to Seeding round-robin tournament |
| 3 | Washington Capitals | 69 | 41 | 20 | 8 | 31 | 240 | 215 | +25 | .652 | Advance to Seeding round-robin tournament |
| 4 | Philadelphia Flyers | 69 | 41 | 21 | 7 | 31 | 232 | 196 | +36 | .645 | Advance to Seeding round-robin tournament |
| 5 | Pittsburgh Penguins | 69 | 40 | 23 | 6 | 29 | 224 | 196 | +28 | .623 | Advance to 2020 Stanley Cup playoffs qualifying round |
| 6 | Carolina Hurricanes | 68 | 38 | 25 | 5 | 27 | 222 | 193 | +29 | .596 | Advance to 2020 Stanley Cup playoffs qualifying round |
| 7 | New York Islanders | 68 | 35 | 23 | 10 | 24 | 192 | 193 | −1 | .588 | Advance to 2020 Stanley Cup playoffs qualifying round |
| 8 | Toronto Maple Leafs | 70 | 36 | 25 | 9 | 28 | 238 | 227 | +11 | .579 | Advance to 2020 Stanley Cup playoffs qualifying round |
| 9 | Columbus Blue Jackets | 70 | 33 | 22 | 15 | 25 | 180 | 187 | −7 | .579 | Advance to 2020 Stanley Cup playoffs qualifying round |
| 10 | Florida Panthers | 69 | 35 | 26 | 8 | 30 | 231 | 228 | +3 | .565 | Advance to 2020 Stanley Cup playoffs qualifying round |
| 11 | New York Rangers | 70 | 37 | 28 | 5 | 31 | 234 | 222 | +12 | .564 | Advance to 2020 Stanley Cup playoffs qualifying round |
| 12 | Montreal Canadiens | 71 | 31 | 31 | 9 | 19 | 212 | 221 | −9 | .500 | Advance to 2020 Stanley Cup playoffs qualifying round |
| 13 | Buffalo Sabres | 69 | 30 | 31 | 8 | 22 | 195 | 217 | −22 | .493 | |
| 14 | New Jersey Devils | 69 | 28 | 29 | 12 | 22 | 189 | 230 | −41 | .493 | |
| 15 | Ottawa Senators | 71 | 25 | 34 | 12 | 18 | 191 | 243 | −52 | .437 | |
| 16 | Detroit Red Wings | 71 | 17 | 49 | 5 | 13 | 145 | 267 | −122 | .275 | |

Source: National Hockey League

== Schedule and results ==
=== Preseason ===
The preseason schedule was published on June 18, 2019. The September 29 game between the Blue Jackets and the St. Louis Blues was cancelled due to issues with the team's flight.

2019 preseason game log: 2–3–1 (home: 2–1–0; road: 0–2–1)
| # | Date | Visitor | Score | Home | OT | Decision | Attendance | Record | Recap |
|---|---|---|---|---|---|---|---|---|---|
| 1 | September 17 | Buffalo | 1–4 | Columbus | | Kivlenieks | — | 1–0–0 |
| 2 | September 19 | Columbus | 1–4 | Pittsburgh | | Vehvilainen | 15,649 | 1–1–0 |
| 3 | September 21 | Pittsburgh | 1–3 | Columbus | | Korpisalo | 13,637 | 2–1–0 |
| 4 | September 22 | Columbus | 3–5 | St. Louis | | Merzlikins | 16,672 | 2–2–0 |
| 5 | September 25 | Columbus | 3–4 | Buffalo | OT | Merzlikins | 15,788 | 2–2–1 |
| 6 | September 27 | New Jersey | 2–0 | Columbus | | Korpisalo | 12,347 | 2–3–1 |
| 7 | September 29 | St. Louis | – | Columbus | Game cancelled due to a mechanical issue with St. Louis' aircraft. |

=== Regular season ===
The regular season schedule was published on June 25, 2019.

2019–20 game log

October: 5–5–2 (home: 3–3–1; road: 2–2–1)
| # | Date | Visitor | Score | Home | OT | Decision | Attendance | Record | Pts | Recap |
|---|---|---|---|---|---|---|---|---|---|---|
| 1 | October 4 | Toronto | 4–1 | Columbus | | Korpisalo | 18,776 | 0–1–0 | 0 |
| 2 | October 5 | Columbus | 2–7 | Pittsburgh | | Merzlikins | 18,595 | 0–2–0 | 0 |
| 3 | October 7 | Buffalo | 3–4 | Columbus | OT | Korpisalo | 14,518 | 1–2–0 | 2 |
| 4 | October 11 | Anaheim | 2–1 | Columbus | | Korpisalo | 15,368 | 1–3–0 | 2 |
| 5 | October 12 | Columbus | 3–2 | Carolina | | Korpisalo | 16,224 | 2–3–0 | 4 |
| 6 | October 16 | Dallas | 2–3 | Columbus | | Korpisalo | 14,683 | 3–3–0 | 6 |
| 7 | October 18 | Columbus | 2–3 | Chicago | OT | Merzlikins | 21,518 | 3–3–1 | 7 |
| 8 | October 19 | NY Islanders | 3–2 | Columbus | OT | Korpisalo | 15,276 | 3–3–2 | 8 |
| 9 | October 21 | Columbus | 4–3 | Toronto | OT | Korpisalo | 18,898 | 4–3–2 | 10 |
| 10 | October 24 | Carolina | 3–4 | Columbus | OT | Korpisalo | 15,398 | 5–3–2 | 12 |
| 11 | October 26 | Columbus | 4–7 | Philadelphia | | Korpisalo | 17,840 | 5–4–2 | 12 |
| 12 | October 30 | Edmonton | 4–1 | Columbus | | Korpisalo | 14,193 | 5–5–2 | 12 |

November: 6–6–2 (home: 5–3–0; road: 1–3–2)
| # | Date | Visitor | Score | Home | OT | Decision | Attendance | Record | Pts | Recap |
|---|---|---|---|---|---|---|---|---|---|---|
| 13 | November 1 | Columbus | 3–4 | St. Louis | OT | Merzlikins | 18,096 | 5–5–3 | 13 |
| 14 | November 2 | Calgary | 3–0 | Columbus | | Korpisalo | 13,618 | 5–6–3 | 13 |
| 15 | November 5 | Vegas | 2–1 | Columbus | | Korpisalo | 15,435 | 5–7–3 | 13 |
| 16 | November 7 | Columbus | 3–2 | Arizona | | Korpisalo | 12,115 | 6–7–3 | 15 |
| 17 | November 9 | Columbus | 2–4 | Colorado | | Korpisalo | 18,070 | 6–8–3 | 15 |
| 18 | November 12 | Columbus | 2–3 | Montreal | SO | Merzlikins | 20,758 | 6–8–4 | 16 |
| 19 | November 15 | St. Louis | 2–3 | Columbus | OT | Korpisalo | 18,505 | 7–8–4 | 18 |
| 20 | November 19 | Montreal | 2–5 | Columbus | | Korpisalo | 14,118 | 8–8–4 | 20 |
| 21 | November 21 | Detroit | 4–5 | Columbus | | Korpisalo | 14,417 | 9–8–4 | 22 |
| 22 | November 23 | Columbus | 3–4 | Winnipeg | | Merzlikins | 15,325 | 9–9–4 | 22 |
| 23 | November 25 | Ottawa | 0–1 | Columbus | | Korpisalo | 14,730 | 10–9–4 | 24 |
| 24 | November 27 | Philadelphia | 3–2 | Columbus | | Korpisalo | 14,975 | 10–10–4 | 24 |
| 25 | November 29 | Pittsburgh | 2–5 | Columbus | | Korpisalo | 17,402 | 11–10–4 | 26 |
| 26 | November 30 | Columbus | 0–2 | NY Islanders | | Merzlikins | 13,433 | 11–11–4 | 26 |

December: 7–3–4 (home: 4–2–1; road: 3–1–3)
| # | Date | Visitor | Score | Home | OT | Decision | Attendance | Record | Pts | Recap |
|---|---|---|---|---|---|---|---|---|---|---|
| 27 | December 3 | Arizona | 4–2 | Columbus | | Korpisalo | 14,455 | 11–12–4 | 26 |
| 28 | December 5 | NY Rangers | 3–2 | Columbus | | Korpisalo | 15,785 | 11–13–4 | 26 |
| 29 | December 7 | Columbus | 1–4 | Florida | | Merzlikins | 11,640 | 11–14–4 | 26 |
| 30 | December 9 | Columbus | 5–2 | Washington | | Korpisalo | 18,573 | 12–14–4 | 28 |
| 31 | December 12 | Columbus | 0–1 | Pittsburgh | OT | Korpisalo | 18,415 | 12–14–5 | 29 |
| 32 | December 14 | Columbus | 3–4 | Ottawa | OT | Korpisalo | 11,020 | 12–14–6 | 30 |
| 33 | December 16 | Washington | 0–3 | Columbus | | Korpisalo | 16,602 | 13–14–6 | 32 |
| 34 | December 17 | Columbus | 5–3 | Detroit | | Korpisalo | 17,639 | 14–14–6 | 34 |
| 35 | December 19 | Los Angeles | 2–3 | Columbus | OT | Korpisalo | 17,117 | 15–14–6 | 36 |
| 36 | December 21 | New Jersey | 1–5 | Columbus | | Korpisalo | 17,188 | 16–14–6 | 38 |
| 37 | December 23 | Columbus | 3–2 | NY Islanders | | Korpisalo | 13,917 | 17–14–6 | 40 |
| 38 | December 27 | Columbus | 1–2 | Washington | OT | Korpisalo | 18,573 | 17–14–7 | 41 |
| 39 | December 29 | Chicago | 3–2 | Columbus | SO | Merzlikins | 18,544 | 17–14–8 | 42 |
| 40 | December 31 | Florida | 1–4 | Columbus | | Merzlikins | 18,977 | 18–14–8 | 44 |

January: 9–2–0 (home: 4–1–0; road: 5–1–0)
| # | Date | Visitor | Score | Home | OT | Decision | Attendance | Record | Pts | Recap |
|---|---|---|---|---|---|---|---|---|---|---|
| 41 | January 2 | Columbus | 2–1 | Boston | OT | Merzlikins | 17,850 | 19–14–8 | 46 |
| 42 | January 4 | San Jose | 3–2 | Columbus | | Merzlikins | 18,874 | 19–15–8 | 46 |
| 43 | January 6 | Columbus | 4–2 | Los Angeles | | Merzlikins | 14,964 | 20–15–8 | 48 |
| 44 | January 7 | Columbus | 4–3 | Anaheim | | Merzlikins | 16,153 | 21–15–8 | 50 |
| 45 | January 9 | Columbus | 1–3 | San Jose | | Merzlikins | 17,085 | 21–16–8 | 50 |
| 46 | January 11 | Columbus | 3–0 | Vegas | | Merzlikins | 18,400 | 22–16–8 | 52 |
| 47 | January 14 | Boston | 0–3 | Columbus | | Merzlikins | 17,349 | 23–16–8 | 54 |
| 48 | January 16 | Carolina | 2–3 | Columbus | | Merzlikins | 17,900 | 24–16–8 | 56 |
| 49 | January 18 | New Jersey | 0–5 | Columbus | | Merzlikins | 18,680 | 25–16–8 | 58 |
| 50 | January 19 | Columbus | 2–1 | NY Rangers | | Kivlenieks | 17,423 | 26–16–8 | 60 |
| 51 | January 22 | Winnipeg | 3–4 | Columbus | | Merzlikins | 18,425 | 27–16–8 | 62 |

February: 4–5–6 (home: 3–3–2; road: 1–2–4)
| # | Date | Visitor | Score | Home | OT | Decision | Attendance | Record | Pts | Recap |
|---|---|---|---|---|---|---|---|---|---|---|
| 52 | February 1 | Columbus | 1–2 | Buffalo | OT | Kivlenieks | 17,650 | 27–16–9 | 63 |
| 53 | February 2 | Columbus | 4–3 | Montreal | | Merzlikins | 21,302 | 28–16–9 | 65 |
| 54 | February 4 | Florida | 0–1 | Columbus | OT | Merzlikins | 17,811 | 29–16–9 | 67 |
| 55 | February 7 | Detroit | 0–2 | Columbus | | Merzlikins | 18,978 | 30–16–9 | 69 |
| 56 | February 8 | Colorado | 2–1 | Columbus | | Merzlikins | 19,022 | 30–17–9 | 69 |
| 57 | February 10 | Tampa Bay | 2–1 | Columbus | OT | Merzlikins | 17,131 | 30–17–10 | 70 |
| 58 | February 13 | Columbus | 3–4 | Buffalo | OT | Kivlenieks | 16,923 | 30–17–11 | 71 |
| 59 | February 14 | NY Rangers | 3–1 | Columbus | | Merzlikins | 18,888 | 30–18–11 | 71 |
| 60 | February 16 | Columbus | 3–4 | New Jersey | SO | Merzlikins | 16,514 | 30–18–12 | 72 |
| 61 | February 18 | Columbus | 1–5 | Philadelphia | | Merzlikins | 18,273 | 30–19–12 | 72 |
| 62 | February 20 | Philadelphia | 4–3 | Columbus | OT | Merzlikins | 18,365 | 30–19–13 | 73 |
| 63 | February 22 | Columbus | 3–4 | Nashville | SO | Merzlikins | 17,549 | 30–19–14 | 74 |
| 64 | February 24 | Ottawa | 3–4 | Columbus | OT | Korpisalo | 17,518 | 31–19–14 | 76 |
| 65 | February 25 | Columbus | 4–5 | Minnesota | | Kivlenieks | 17,057 | 31–20–14 | 76 |
| 66 | February 28 | Minnesota | 5–0 | Columbus | | Korpisalo | 18,955 | 31–21–14 | 76 |

March: 2–1–1 (home: 1–0–0; road: 1–1–1)
| # | Date | Visitor | Score | Home | OT | Decision | Attendance | Record | Pts | Recap |
|---|---|---|---|---|---|---|---|---|---|---|
| 67 | March 1 | Vancouver | 3–5 | Columbus | | Korpisalo | 18,378 | 32–21–14 | 78 |
| 68 | March 4 | Columbus | 2–3 | Calgary | OT | Korpisalo | 18,696 | 32–21–15 | 79 |
| 69 | March 7 | Columbus | 1–4 | Edmonton | | Korpisalo | 17,085 | 32–22–15 | 79 |
| 70 | March 8 | Columbus | 2–1 | Vancouver | | Merzlikins | 18,871 | 33–22–15 | 81 |

Cancelled games
| # | Date | Visitor | Home |
|---|---|---|---|
| 71 | March 12 | Pittsburgh | Columbus |
| 72 | March 14 | Nashville | Columbus |
| 73 | March 16 | Columbus | Boston |
| 74 | March 19 | Washington | Columbus |
| 75 | March 21 | Columbus | Toronto |
| 76 | March 23 | Columbus | New Jersey |
| 77 | March 24 | Columbus | NY Rangers |
| 78 | March 27 | Columbus | Tampa Bay |
| 79 | March 28 | Columbus | Dallas |
| 80 | March 30 | NY Islanders | Columbus |
| 81 | April 2 | Tampa Bay | Columbus |
| 82 | April 3 | Columbus | Carolina |

Legend: Win (2 points) Loss (0 points) Overtime/shootout loss (1 point)

=== Playoffs ===
The Blue Jackets defeated the Toronto Maple Leafs in the qualifying round in five games.

The Blue Jackets faced the Tampa Bay Lightning in the first round, and lost in five games.

2020 Stanley Cup playoffs

Eastern Conference Qualifying Round vs. (8) Toronto Maple Leafs: Columbus won 3–2
| # | Date | Visitor | Score | Home | OT | Decision | Series | Recap |
|---|---|---|---|---|---|---|---|---|
| 1 | August 2 | Columbus | 2–0 | Toronto | | Korpisalo | 1–0 |
| 2 | August 4 | Columbus | 0–3 | Toronto | | Korpisalo | 1–1 |
| 3 | August 6 | Toronto | 3–4 | Columbus | OT | Merzlikins | 2–1 |
| 4 | August 7 | Toronto | 4–3 | Columbus | OT | Merzlikins | 2–2 |
| 5 | August 9 | Columbus | 3–0 | Toronto | | Korpisalo | 3–2 |

Eastern Conference first round vs. (2) Tampa Bay Lightning: Tampa Bay won 4–1
| # | Date | Visitor | Score | Home | OT | Decision | Series | Recap |
|---|---|---|---|---|---|---|---|---|
| 1 | August 11 | Columbus | 2–3 | Tampa Bay | 5OT | Korpisalo | 0–1 |
| 2 | August 13 | Columbus | 3–1 | Tampa Bay | | Korpisalo | 1–1 |
| 3 | August 15 | Tampa Bay | 3–2 | Columbus | | Korpisalo | 1–2 |
| 4 | August 17 | Tampa Bay | 2–1 | Columbus | | Korpisalo | 1–3 |
| 5 | August 19 | Columbus | 4–5 | Tampa Bay | OT | Korpisalo | 1–4 |

Legend: Win Loss

== Player statistics ==
=== Skaters ===
Regular season
| Player | GP | G | A | Pts | +/− | PIM |
|---|---|---|---|---|---|---|
| Pierre-Luc Dubois | 70 | 18 | 31 | 49 | −2 | 49 |
| Gustav Nyquist | 70 | 15 | 27 | 42 | 4 | 16 |
| Zach Werenski | 63 | 20 | 21 | 41 | 9 | 10 |
| Oliver Bjorkstrand | 49 | 21 | 15 | 36 | 8 | 12 |
| Nick Foligno | 67 | 10 | 21 | 31 | −3 | 62 |
| Seth Jones | 56 | 6 | 24 | 30 | 10 | 20 |
| Cam Atkinson | 44 | 12 | 14 | 26 | 2 | 6 |
| Boone Jenner | 70 | 11 | 13 | 24 | −14 | 36 |
| Alexander Wennberg | 57 | 5 | 17 | 22 | −5 | 16 |
| Emil Bemstrom | 56 | 10 | 10 | 20 | −10 | 8 |
| Vladislav Gavrikov | 69 | 5 | 13 | 18 | 1 | 18 |
| Sonny Milano^{‡} | 46 | 5 | 13 | 18 | −5 | 22 |
| Riley Nash | 64 | 5 | 9 | 14 | 6 | 10 |
| Alexandre Texier | 36 | 6 | 7 | 13 | 3 | 10 |
| Eric Robinson | 50 | 7 | 5 | 12 | 10 | 12 |
| David Savard | 68 | 0 | 11 | 11 | −3 | 35 |
| Kevin Stenlund | 32 | 6 | 4 | 10 | 2 | 8 |
| Nathan Gerbe | 30 | 4 | 6 | 10 | −7 | 22 |
| Markus Nutivaara | 37 | 3 | 6 | 9 | 2 | 4 |
| Ryan Murray | 27 | 2 | 7 | 9 | −9 | 4 |
| Scott Harrington | 39 | 1 | 7 | 8 | −3 | 16 |
| Jakob Lilja | 37 | 2 | 3 | 5 | 5 | 2 |
| Dean Kukan | 33 | 1 | 4 | 5 | −9 | 12 |
| Josh Anderson | 26 | 1 | 3 | 4 | −8 | 17 |
| Stefan Matteau | 9 | 2 | 1 | 3 | 0 | 5 |
| Andrew Peeke | 22 | 1 | 2 | 3 | 1 | 4 |
| Devin Shore^{†} | 6 | 1 | 1 | 2 | −2 | 0 |
| Ryan MacInnis | 10 | 0 | 1 | 1 | 1 | 0 |
| Liam Foudy | 2 | 0 | 1 | 1 | 1 | 0 |
| Calvin Thurkauf | 3 | 0 | 0 | 0 | 0 | 0 |
| Gabriel Carlsson | 6 | 0 | 0 | 0 | −1 | 2 |
| Kole Sherwood | 3 | 0 | 0 | 0 | 0 | 2 |
| Marko Dano | 3 | 0 | 0 | 0 | −1 | 2 |

Playoffs
| Player | GP | G | A | Pts | +/− | PIM |
|---|---|---|---|---|---|---|
| Pierre-Luc Dubois | 10 | 4 | 6 | 10 | 3 | 4 |
| Cam Atkinson | 8 | 3 | 5 | 8 | 3 | 4 |
| Nick Foligno | 10 | 2 | 4 | 6 | 1 | 10 |
| Alexander Wennberg | 10 | 3 | 2 | 5 | 5 | 2 |
| Seth Jones | 10 | 1 | 3 | 4 | 2 | 4 |
| Alexandre Texier | 10 | 0 | 4 | 4 | 0 | 2 |
| Oliver Bjorkstrand | 10 | 3 | 0 | 3 | −5 | 0 |
| Zach Werenski | 10 | 1 | 2 | 3 | 1 | 4 |
| Vladislav Gavrikov | 10 | 1 | 2 | 3 | −4 | 6 |
| David Savard | 10 | 0 | 3 | 3 | −4 | 2 |
| Riley Nash | 10 | 1 | 1 | 2 | −4 | 0 |
| Liam Foudy | 10 | 1 | 1 | 2 | −1 | 0 |
| Gustav Nyquist | 10 | 0 | 2 | 2 | 0 | 4 |
| Kevin Stenlund | 2 | 1 | 0 | 1 | 1 | 0 |
| Boone Jenner | 10 | 1 | 0 | 1 | −3 | 4 |
| Eric Robinson | 10 | 1 | 0 | 1 | 0 | 0 |
| Ryan Murray | 9 | 1 | 0 | 1 | 0 | 2 |
| Dean Kukan | 9 | 0 | 1 | 1 | 2 | 7 |
| Emil Bemstrom | 5 | 0 | 0 | 0 | −1 | 2 |
| Nathan Gerbe | 2 | 0 | 0 | 0 | 0 | 0 |
| Devin Shore | 2 | 0 | 0 | 0 | −1 | 0 |
| Markus Nutivaara | 2 | 0 | 0 | 0 | −1 | 0 |
| Scott Harrington | 1 | 0 | 0 | 0 | −1 | 0 |

=== Goaltenders ===
Regular season
| Player | GP | GS | TOI | W | L | OT | GA | GAA | SA | SV% | SO | G | A | PIM |
|---|---|---|---|---|---|---|---|---|---|---|---|---|---|---|
| Joonas Korpisalo | 37 | 35 | 2,125:54 | 19 | 12 | 5 | 92 | 2.60 | 1,030 | .911 | 2 | 0 | 1 | 0 |
| Elvis Merzlikins | 33 | 31 | 1,815:08 | 13 | 9 | 8 | 71 | 2.35 | 919 | .923 | 5 | 0 | 0 | 0 |
| Matīss Kivlenieks | 6 | 4 | 284:50 | 1 | 1 | 2 | 14 | 2.95 | 137 | .898 | 0 | 0 | 0 | 0 |

Playoffs
| Player | GP | GS | TOI | W | L | GA | GAA | SA | SV% | SO | G | A | PIM |
|---|---|---|---|---|---|---|---|---|---|---|---|---|---|
| Joonas Korpisalo | 9 | 9 | 599:00 | 3 | 5 | 19 | 1.90 | 320 | .941 | 2 | 0 | 0 | 0 |
| Elvis Merzlikins | 2 | 1 | 122:45 | 1 | 1 | 4 | 1.96 | 74 | .946 | 0 | 0 | 1 | 0 |

^{†}Denotes player spent time with another team before joining the Blue Jackets. Stats reflect time with the Blue Jackets only.
^{‡}Denotes player was traded mid-season. Stats reflect time with the Blue Jackets only.
Bold/italics denotes franchise record.
