= 2019–20 Chicago Blackhawks season =

National Hockey League team season

2019–20 Chicago Blackhawks
- Division: 7th Central
- Conference: 12th Western
- 2019–20 record: 32–30–8
- Home record: 16–14–4
- Road record: 16–16–4
- Goals for: 212
- Goals against: 218

Team information
- General manager: Stan Bowman
- Coach: Jeremy Colliton
- Captain: Jonathan Toews
- Alternate captains: Duncan Keith; Patrick Kane (Dec.–Aug.); Brent Seabrook
- Arena: United Center
- Average attendance: 21,441
- Minor league affiliates: Rockford IceHogs (AHL); Indy Fuel (ECHL)

Team leaders
- Goals: Patrick Kane (33)
- Assists: Patrick Kane (51)
- Points: Patrick Kane (84)
- Penalty minutes: Jonathan Toews (48)
- Plus/minus: Calvin de Haan (+10)
- Wins: Corey Crawford; Robin Lehner (16)
- Goals against average: Corey Crawford (2.77)

The 2019–20 Chicago Blackhawks season was the 94th season for the National Hockey League (NHL) franchise that was established on September 25, 1926. The Blackhawks were led by head coach Jeremy Colliton in his first full year as head coach.

The season was suspended by the league officials on March 12, 2020, after several other professional and collegiate sports organizations followed suit as a result of the ongoing COVID-19 pandemic. On May 26, the NHL regular season was officially declared over with the remaining games being cancelled. The Blackhawks advanced to the playoffs for the first time since the 2016–17 season by defeating the Edmonton Oilers, but were defeated in the first round by the Vegas Golden Knights in five games.

== Standings ==
=== Divisional standings ===
Central Division
Pos	Team	GP	W	L	OTL	RW	GF	GA	GD	Pts
1	St. Louis Blues	71	42	19	10	33	225	193	+32	94
2	Colorado Avalanche	70	42	20	8	37	237	191	+46	92
3	Dallas Stars	69	37	24	8	26	180	177	+3	82
4	Winnipeg Jets	71	37	28	6	30	216	203	+13	80
5	Nashville Predators	69	35	26	8	28	215	217	−2	78
6	Minnesota Wild	69	35	27	7	30	220	220	0	77
7	Chicago Blackhawks	70	32	30	8	23	212	218	−6	72

Source: National Hockey League

=== Western Conference ===
Pos	Team	GP	W	L	OTL	RW	GF	GA	GD	PCT	Qualification
1	St. Louis Blues	71	42	19	10	33	225	193	+32	.662	Advance to Seeding round-robin tournament
2	Colorado Avalanche	70	42	20	8	37	237	191	+46	.657	Advance to Seeding round-robin tournament
3	Vegas Golden Knights	71	39	24	8	30	227	211	+16	.606	Advance to Seeding round-robin tournament
4	Dallas Stars	69	37	24	8	26	180	177	+3	.594	Advance to Seeding round-robin tournament
5	Edmonton Oilers	71	37	25	9	31	225	217	+8	.585	Advance to 2020 Stanley Cup playoffs qualifying round
6	Nashville Predators	69	35	26	8	28	215	217	−2	.565	Advance to 2020 Stanley Cup playoffs qualifying round
7	Vancouver Canucks	69	36	27	6	27	228	217	+11	.565	Advance to 2020 Stanley Cup playoffs qualifying round
8	Calgary Flames	70	36	27	7	25	210	215	−5	.564	Advance to 2020 Stanley Cup playoffs qualifying round
9	Winnipeg Jets	71	37	28	6	30	216	203	+13	.563	Advance to 2020 Stanley Cup playoffs qualifying round
10	Minnesota Wild	69	35	27	7	30	220	220	0	.558	Advance to 2020 Stanley Cup playoffs qualifying round
11	Arizona Coyotes	70	33	29	8	26	195	187	+8	.529	Advance to 2020 Stanley Cup playoffs qualifying round
12	Chicago Blackhawks	70	32	30	8	23	212	218	−6	.514	Advance to 2020 Stanley Cup playoffs qualifying round
13	Anaheim Ducks	71	29	33	9	20	187	226	−39	.472	
14	Los Angeles Kings	70	29	35	6	21	178	212	−34	.457	
15	San Jose Sharks	70	29	36	5	22	182	226	−44	.450	

Source: National Hockey League

Tiebreaking procedures

1. Fewer number of games played (only used during regular season).
2. Greater number of regulation wins (denoted by RW).
3. Greater number of wins in regulation and overtime (excluding shootout wins; denoted by ROW).
4. Greater number of total wins (including shootouts).
5. Greater number of points earned in head-to-head play; if teams played an uneven number of head-to-head games, the result of the first game on the home ice of the team with the extra home game is discarded.
6. Greater goal differential (difference between goals for and goals against).
7. Greater number of goals scored (denoted by GF).

== Schedule and results ==
=== Preseason ===
The preseason schedule was published on June 18, 2019.

2019 preseason game log: 3–3–1 (Home: 2–1–0; Road: 1–2–1)
#	Date	Opponent	Score	OT	Decision	Arena	Attendance	Record	Streak	Recap
1	September 16	@ Washington	3–4	OT	Delia	Capital One Arena	14,517	0–0–1	O1
2	September 17	@ Detroit	3–5		Lankinen	Little Caesars Arena	15,108	0–1–1	L1
3	September 18	Detroit	2–1		Crawford	United Center	20,523	1–1–1	W1
4	September 21	Boston	3–2	OT	Lehner	United Center	20,611	2–1–1	W2
5	September 25	Washington	0–6		Crawford	United Center	20,239	2–2–1	L1
6	September 28	@ Boston	2–8		Lankinen	TD Garden	17,565	2–3–1	L2
7	September 29	@ Eisbären Berlin	3–1		Lehner	Mercedes-Benz Arena	—	3–3–1	W1

=== Regular season ===
The regular season schedule was published on June 25, 2019.

2019–20 game log

October: 3–6–2 (Home: 3–3–2; Road: 0–3–0)
#	Date	Opponent	Score	OT	Decision	Arena	Attendance	Record	Pts	Streak	Recap
1	October 4	@ Philadelphia	3–4		Crawford	O2 Arena	17,463	0–1–0	0	L1
2	October 10	San Jose	4–5		Crawford	United Center	21,455	0–2–0	0	L2
3	October 12	Winnipeg	2–3	OT	Lehner	United Center	21,340	0–2–1	1	O1
4	October 14	Edmonton	3–1		Crawford	United Center	21,260	1–2–1	3	W1
5	October 18	Columbus	3–2	OT	Lehner	United Center	21,518	2–2–1	5	W2
6	October 20	Washington	3–5		Crawford	United Center	21,187	2–3–1	5	L1
7	October 22	Vegas	1–2	SO	Lehner	United Center	21,172	2–3–2	6	O1
8	October 24	Philadelphia	1–4		Lehner	United Center	21,315	2–4–2	6	L1
9	October 26	@ Carolina	0–4		Crawford	PNC Arena	15,738	2–5–2	6	L2
10	October 27	Los Angeles	5–1		Lehner	United Center	21,334	3–5–2	8	W1
11	October 29	@ Nashville	0–3		Lehner	Bridgestone Arena	17,259	3–6–2	8	L1

November: 7–5–3 (Home: 4–3–0; Road: 3–2–3)
#	Date	Opponent	Score	OT	Decision	Arena	Attendance	Record	Pts	Streak	Recap
12	November 2	@ Los Angeles	3–4	OT	Crawford	Staples Center	18,230	3–6–3	9	O1
13	November 3	@ Anaheim	3–2	OT	Lehner	Honda Center	15,576	4–6–3	11	W1
14	November 5	@ San Jose	2–4		Lehner	SAP Center	16,087	4–7–3	11	L1
15	November 7	Vancouver	5–2		Crawford	United Center	21,418	5–7–3	13	W1
16	November 9	@ Pittsburgh	2–3	SO	Crawford	PPG Paints Arena	18,653	5–7–4	14	O1
17	November 10	Toronto	5–4		Lehner	United Center	21,598	6–7–4	16	W1
18	November 13	@ Vegas	5–3		Crawford	T-Mobile Arena	18,324	7–7–4	18	W2
19	November 16	@ Nashville	7–2		Lehner	Bridgestone Arena	17,393	8–7–4	20	W3
20	November 17	Buffalo	4–1		Crawford	United Center	21,334	9–7–4	22	W4
21	November 19	Carolina	2–4		Lehner	United Center	21,325	9–8–4	22	L1
22	November 21	Tampa Bay	2–4		Crawford	United Center	21,336	9–9–4	22	L2
23	November 23	@ Dallas	1–2	SO	Lehner	American Airlines Center	18,532	9–9–5	23	O1
24	November 26	Dallas	3–0		Crawford	United Center	21,210	10–9–5	25	W1
25	November 29	Colorado	2–5		Crawford	United Center	21,822	10–10–5	25	L1
26	November 30	@ Colorado	3–7		Lehner	Pepsi Center	18,015	10–11–5	25	L2

December: 8–6–1 (Home: 2–3–1; Road: 6–3–0)
#	Date	Opponent	Score	OT	Decision	Arena	Attendance	Record	Pts	Streak	Recap
27	December 2	St. Louis	0–4		Crawford	United Center	21,204	10–12–5	25	L3
28	December 5	@ Boston	4–3	OT	Lehner	TD Garden	17,850	11–12–5	27	W1
29	December 6	@ New Jersey	2–1	SO	Crawford	Prudential Center	15,273	12–12–5	29	W2
30	December 8	Arizona	3–4	SO	Lehner	United Center	21,232	12–12–6	30	O1
31	December 10	@ Vegas	1–5		Crawford	T-Mobile Arena	18,319	12–13–6	30	L1
32	December 12	@ Arizona	2–5		Lehner	Gila River Arena	13,150	12–14–6	30	L2
33	December 14	@ St. Louis	3–4		Crawford	Enterprise Center	18,096	12–15–6	30	L3
34	December 15	Minnesota	5–3		Lehner	United Center	21,513	13–15–6	32	W1
35	December 18	Colorado	1–4		Crawford	United Center	21,481	13–16–6	32	L1
36	December 19	@ Winnipeg	4–1		Lehner	Bell MTS Place	15,325	14–16–6	34	W1
37	December 21	@ Colorado	5–3		Lehner	Pepsi Center	18,056	15–16–6	36	W2
38	December 23	New Jersey	1–7		Crawford	United Center	21,559	15–17–6	36	L1
39	December 27	NY Islanders	5–2		Lehner	United Center	21,747	16–17–6	38	W1
40	December 29	@ Columbus	3–2	SO	Lehner	Nationwide Arena	18,544	17–17–6	40	W2
41	December 31	@ Calgary	5–3		Lehner	Scotiabank Saddledome	19,289	18–17–6	42	W3

January: 6–4–0 (Home: 3–3–0; Road: 3–1–0)
#	Date	Opponent	Score	OT	Decision	Arena	Attendance	Record	Pts	Streak	Recap
42	January 2	@ Vancouver	5–7		Lehner	Rogers Arena	18,871	18–18–6	42	L1
43	January 5	Detroit	4–2		Crawford	United Center	21,493	19–18–6	44	W1
44	January 7	Calgary	1–2		Crawford	United Center	21,274	19–19–6	44	L1
45	January 9	Nashville	2–5		Crawford	United Center	21,440	19–20–6	44	L2
46	January 11	Anaheim	4–2		Lehner	United Center	21,548	20–20–6	46	W1
47	January 14	@ Ottawa	3–2	OT	Lehner	Canadian Tire Centre	12,238	21–20–6	48	W2
48	January 15	@ Montreal	4–1		Crawford	Bell Centre	21,302	22–20–6	50	W3
49	January 18	@ Toronto	6–2		Crawford	Scotiabank Arena	19,502	23–20–6	52	W4
50	January 19	Winnipeg	5–2		Lehner	United Center	21,487	24–20–6	54	W5
51	January 21	Florida	3–4		Lehner	United Center	21,559	24–21–6	54	L1

February: 5–7–2 (Home: 1–1–1; Road: 4–6–1)
#	Date	Opponent	Score	OT	Decision	Arena	Attendance	Record	Pts	Streak	Recap
52	February 1	@ Arizona	3–2	SO	Crawford	Gila River Arena	17,125	25–21–6	56	W1
53	February 4	@ Minnesota	2–3	OT	Crawford	Xcel Energy Center	17,341	25–21–7	57	O1
54	February 5	Boston	1–2	OT	Lehner	United Center	21,472	25–21–8	58	O2
55	February 9	@ Winnipeg	2–5		Crawford	Bell MTS Place	15,325	25–22–8	58	L1
56	February 11	@ Edmonton	3–5		Lehner	Rogers Place	17,066	25–23–8	58	L2
57	February 12	@ Vancouver	0–3		Crawford	Rogers Arena	18,871	25–24–8	58	L3
58	February 15	@ Calgary	8–4		Lehner	Scotiabank Saddledome	19,231	26–24–8	60	W1
59	February 16	@ Winnipeg	2–3		Crawford	Bell MTS Place	15,325	26–25–8	60	L1
60	February 19	NY Rangers	3–6		Lehner	United Center	21,573	26–26–8	60	L2
61	February 21	Nashville	2–1	OT	Crawford	United Center	21,878	27–26–8	62	W1
62	February 23	@ Dallas	1–2		Crawford	American Airlines Center	18,532	27–27–8	62	L1
63	February 25	@ St. Louis	5–6		Crawford	Enterprise Center	18,096	27–28–8	62	L2
64	February 27	@ Tampa Bay	5–2		Crawford	Amalie Arena	19,092	28–28–8	64	W1
65	February 29	@ Florida	3–2	SO	Crawford	BB&T Center	16,055	29–28–8	66	W2

March: 3–2–0 (Home: 3–1–0; Road: 0–1–0)
#	Date	Opponent	Score	OT	Decision	Arena	Attendance	Record	Pts	Streak	Recap
66	March 3	Anaheim	6–2		Crawford	United Center	21,345	30–28–8	68	W3
67	March 5	Edmonton	4–3		Crawford	United Center	21,481	31–28–8	70	W4
68	March 6	@ Detroit	1–2		Crawford	Little Caesars Arena	19,515	31–29–8	70	L1
69	March 8	St. Louis	0–2		Crawford	United Center	21,815	31–30–8	70	L2
70	March 11	San Jose	6–2		Crawford	United Center	21,275	32–30–8	72	W1

Cancelled games
#	Date	Opponent	Arena
71	March 13	Ottawa	United Center
72	March 14	@ Washington	Capital One Arena
73	March 17	@ Minnesota	Xcel Energy Center
74	March 19	Minnesota	United Center
75	March 21	@ Buffalo	KeyBank Center
76	March 22	Nashville	United Center
77	March 25	Pittsburgh	United Center
78	March 27	Dallas	United Center
79	March 29	Los Angeles	United Center
80	March 31	Montreal	United Center
81	April 2	@ NY Islanders	Nassau Coliseum
82	April 4	@ NY Rangers	Madison Square Garden

Legend: Win (2 points) Loss (0 points) Overtime/shootout loss (1 point)

=== Playoffs ===
The Blackhawks faced the Edmonton Oilers in the qualifying round, defeating them in four games.

The Blackhawks faced the Vegas Golden Knights in the first round, losing in five games.

2020 Stanley Cup playoffs

Western Conference Qualifying Round vs. (5) Edmonton Oilers: Chicago won 3–1
#	Date	Visitor	Score	Home	OT	Decision	Series	Recap
1	August 1	Chicago	6–4	Edmonton		Crawford	1–0
2	August 3	Chicago	3–6	Edmonton		Crawford	1–1
3	August 5	Edmonton	3–4	Chicago		Crawford	2–1
4	August 7	Edmonton	2–3	Chicago		Crawford	3–1

Western Conference First Round vs. (1) Vegas Golden Knights: Vegas won 4–1
#	Date	Visitor	Score	Home	OT	Decision	Series	Recap
1	August 11	Chicago	1–4	Vegas		Crawford	0–1
2	August 13	Chicago	3–4	Vegas	OT	Crawford	0–2
3	August 15	Vegas	2–1	Chicago		Crawford	0–3
4	August 16	Vegas	1–3	Chicago		Crawford	1–3
5	August 18	Chicago	3–4	Vegas		Crawford	1–4

Legend: Win Loss

=== Detailed records ===
Western Conference
Opponent	Home	Away	Total	Pts	GF	GA
Central Division
Chicago Blackhawks	—	—	—	—	—	—
Colorado Avalanche	0–2–0	1–1–0	1–3–0	2	11	19
Dallas Stars	1–0–0	0–1–1	1–1–1	3	5	4
Minnesota Wild	1–0–0	0–0–1	1–0–1	3	7	6
Nashville Predators	1–1–0	1–1–0	2–2–0	4	11	11
St. Louis Blues	0–2–0	0–2–0	0–4–0	0	8	16
Winnipeg Jets	1–0–1	1–2–0	2–2–1	5	15	14
Total	4–5–1	3–7–2	7–12–3	17	57	70
Pacific Division
Anaheim Ducks	2–0–0	1–0–0	3–0–0	6	13	6
Arizona Coyotes	0–0–1	1–1–0	1–1–1	3	8	11
Calgary Flames	0–1–0	2–0–0	2–1–0	4	14	9
Edmonton Oilers	2–0–0	0–1–0	3–1–0	4	10	9
Los Angeles Kings	1–0–0	0–0–1	1–0–1	3	8	5
San Jose Sharks	1–1–0	0–1–0	1–2–0	2	12	11
Vancouver Canucks	1–0–0	0–2–0	1–2–0	2	10	12
Vegas Golden Knights	0–0–1	1–1–0	1–1–1	3	7	10
Total	7–2–2	5–6–1	12–8–3	27	82	73

Eastern Conference
Opponent	Home	Away	Total	Pts	GF	GA
Atlantic Division
Boston Bruins	0–0–1	1–0–0	1–0–1	3	5	5
Buffalo Sabres	1–0–0	0–0–0	1–0–0	2	4	1
Detroit Red Wings	1–0–0	0–1–0	1–1–0	2	5	4
Florida Panthers	0–1–0	1–0–0	1–1–0	2	6	6
Montreal Canadiens	0–0–0	1–0–0	1–0–0	2	4	1
Ottawa Senators	0–0–0	1–0–0	1–0–0	2	3	2
Tampa Bay Lightning	0–1–0	1–0–0	1–1–0	2	7	6
Toronto Maple Leafs	1–0–0	1–0–0	2–0–0	4	11	6
Total	3–2–1	6–1–0	9–3–1	19	45	31
Metropolitan Division
Carolina Hurricanes	0–1–0	0–1–0	0–2–0	0	2	8
Columbus Blue Jackets	1–0–0	1–0–0	2–0–0	4	6	4
New Jersey Devils	0–1–0	1–0–0	1–1–0	2	3	8
New York Islanders	1–0–0	0–0–0	1–0–0	2	5	2
New York Rangers	0–1–0	0–0–0	0–1–0	0	3	6
Philadelphia Flyers	0–1–0	0–1–0	0–2–0	0	4	8
Pittsburgh Penguins	0–0–0	0–0–1	0–0–1	1	2	3
Washington Capitals	0–1–0	0–0–0	0–1–0	0	3	5
Total	2–5–0	2–2–1	4–7–1	9	28	44

== Player statistics ==
=== Skaters ===
Regular season
Player	GP	G	A	Pts	+/−	PIM
Patrick Kane	70	33	51	84	8	40
Jonathan Toews	70	18	42	60	−2	48
Dominik Kubalik	68	30	16	46	2	16
Alex DeBrincat	70	18	27	45	−10	15
Dylan Strome	58	12	26	38	1	16
Brandon Saad	58	21	12	33	2	16
Duncan Keith	61	3	24	27	1	18
Alexander Nylander	65	10	16	26	−2	10
Erik Gustafsson^{‡}	59	6	20	26	−8	25
Kirby Dach	64	8	15	23	−1	24
Connor Murphy	58	5	14	19	2	27
Olli Maatta	65	4	13	17	0	20
David Kampf	70	8	8	16	−11	8
Drake Caggiula	40	9	6	15	−3	32
Ryan Carpenter	69	3	12	15	−6	28
Adam Boqvist	41	4	9	13	−3	6
Zack Smith	50	4	7	11	2	29
Andrew Shaw	26	3	7	10	−4	33
Slater Koekkoek	42	1	9	10	3	42
Matthew Highmore	36	2	4	6	−1	6
Calvin de Haan	29	1	5	6	10	10
Brent Seabrook	32	3	1	4	1	8
Dylan Sikura	9	1	2	3	1	0
Dennis Gilbert	21	1	2	3	−8	38
Lucas Carlsson	6	0	1	1	3	0
Nick Seeler^{†}	6	0	1	1	−2	7
John Quenneville	9	0	0	0	−1	0
Brandon Hagel	1	0	0	0	0	0
Nicolas Beaudin	1	0	0	0	1	0
Anton Wedin	4	0	0	0	1	4
Brendan Perlini^{‡}	1	0	0	0	0	0

Playoffs
Player	GP	G	A	Pts	+/−	PIM
Jonathan Toews	9	5	4	9	−2	2
Patrick Kane	9	2	7	9	0	2
Dominik Kubalik	9	4	4	8	−2	4
Olli Maatta	9	3	3	6	7	4
Alex DeBrincat	9	2	4	6	4	9
Kirby Dach	9	1	5	6	3	4
Brandon Saad	9	2	3	5	2	2
Duncan Keith	9	0	5	5	−7	4
Matthew Highmore	9	3	1	4	−1	2
Connor Murphy	9	0	4	4	−1	4
Dylan Strome	9	2	1	3	−3	2
Slater Koekkoek	9	1	2	3	4	2
Drake Caggiula	8	1	2	3	0	2
David Kampf	9	1	0	1	0	6
Ryan Carpenter	9	0	1	1	−4	0
Calvin de Haan	9	0	1	1	1	0
Alexander Nylander	8	0	0	0	−4	2
Adam Boqvist	8	0	0	0	−5	4
Lucas Carlsson	1	0	0	0	−2	0
John Quenneville	2	0	0	0	−1	0

=== Goaltenders ===
Regular season
Player	GP	GS	TOI	W	L	OT	GA	GAA	SA	SV%	SO	G	A	PIM
Robin Lehner^{‡}	33	31	1,875:28	16	10	5	94	3.01	1,152	.918	0	0	0	4
Corey Crawford	40	39	2,340:03	16	20	3	108	2.77	1,294	.917	1	0	0	0
Malcolm Subban	1	0	1:10	0	0	0	0	0.00	0	1.000	0	0	0	0

Playoffs
Player	GP	GS	TOI	W	L	GA	GAA	SA	SV%	SO	G	A	PIM
Corey Crawford	9	9	544:01	4	5	30	3.31	324	.907	0	0	0	0

^{†}Denotes player spent time with another team before joining the Blackhawks. Stats reflect time with the Blackhawks only.
^{‡}Denotes player was traded mid-season. Stats reflect time with the Blackhawks only.
Bold/italics denotes franchise record.
