= 2019–20 Anaheim Ducks season =

Professional ice hockey team season

2019–20 Anaheim Ducks
- Division: 6th Pacific
- Conference: 13th Western
- 2019–20 record: 29–33–9
- Home record: 16–15–5
- Road record: 13–18–4
- Goals for: 187
- Goals against: 226

Team information
- General manager: Bob Murray
- Coach: Dallas Eakins
- Captain: Ryan Getzlaf
- Alternate captains: Ryan Kesler; Josh Manson; Jakob Silfverberg
- Arena: Honda Center
- Average attendance: 15,846
- Minor league affiliate: San Diego Gulls (AHL)

Team leaders
- Goals: Adam Henrique (26)
- Assists: Ryan Getzlaf (29)
- Points: Adam Henrique (43)
- Penalty minutes: Nicolas Deslauriers (92)
- Plus/minus: Michael Del Zotto; Carter Rowney (+5)
- Wins: John Gibson (20)
- Goals against average: Anthony Stolarz (2.05)

The 2019–20 Anaheim Ducks season was the 27th season for the National Hockey League (NHL) franchise that was established on June 15, 1993. The Ducks missed the playoffs for consecutive seasons for the first time since the 2001–02 season.

The season was suspended by the league officials on March 12, 2020, after several other professional and collegiate sports organizations followed suit as a result of the ongoing COVID-19 pandemic. On May 26, the NHL regular season was officially declared over with the remaining games being cancelled. When the season ended, the Ducks ranked sixth in the Pacific Division and had a record of 29–33–9. This is the first time since the 2001–02 season that the Ducks missed the playoffs for consecutive years.

== Standings ==
=== Divisional standings ===
Pacific Division
Pos	Team	GP	W	L	OTL	RW	GF	GA	GD	Pts
1	Vegas Golden Knights	71	39	24	8	30	227	211	+16	86
2	Edmonton Oilers	71	37	25	9	31	225	217	+8	83
3	Calgary Flames	70	36	27	7	25	210	215	−5	79
4	Vancouver Canucks	69	36	27	6	27	228	217	+11	78
5	Arizona Coyotes	70	33	29	8	26	195	187	+8	74
6	Anaheim Ducks	71	29	33	9	20	187	226	−39	67
7	Los Angeles Kings	70	29	35	6	21	178	212	−34	64
8	San Jose Sharks	70	29	36	5	22	182	226	−44	63

Source: National Hockey League

=== Western Conference ===
Pos	Team	GP	W	L	OTL	RW	GF	GA	GD	PCT	Qualification
1	St. Louis Blues	71	42	19	10	33	225	193	+32	.662	Advance to Seeding round-robin tournament
2	Colorado Avalanche	70	42	20	8	37	237	191	+46	.657	Advance to Seeding round-robin tournament
3	Vegas Golden Knights	71	39	24	8	30	227	211	+16	.606	Advance to Seeding round-robin tournament
4	Dallas Stars	69	37	24	8	26	180	177	+3	.594	Advance to Seeding round-robin tournament
5	Edmonton Oilers	71	37	25	9	31	225	217	+8	.585	Advance to 2020 Stanley Cup playoffs qualifying round
6	Nashville Predators	69	35	26	8	28	215	217	−2	.565	Advance to 2020 Stanley Cup playoffs qualifying round
7	Vancouver Canucks	69	36	27	6	27	228	217	+11	.565	Advance to 2020 Stanley Cup playoffs qualifying round
8	Calgary Flames	70	36	27	7	25	210	215	−5	.564	Advance to 2020 Stanley Cup playoffs qualifying round
9	Winnipeg Jets	71	37	28	6	30	216	203	+13	.563	Advance to 2020 Stanley Cup playoffs qualifying round
10	Minnesota Wild	69	35	27	7	30	220	220	0	.558	Advance to 2020 Stanley Cup playoffs qualifying round
11	Arizona Coyotes	70	33	29	8	26	195	187	+8	.529	Advance to 2020 Stanley Cup playoffs qualifying round
12	Chicago Blackhawks	70	32	30	8	23	212	218	−6	.514	Advance to 2020 Stanley Cup playoffs qualifying round
13	Anaheim Ducks	71	29	33	9	20	187	226	−39	.472	
14	Los Angeles Kings	70	29	35	6	21	178	212	−34	.457	
15	San Jose Sharks	70	29	36	5	22	182	226	−44	.450	

Source: National Hockey League

==== Tiebreaking procedures ====
1. Fewer number of games played (only used during regular season).
2. Greater number of regulation wins (denoted by RW).
3. Greater number of wins in regulation and overtime (excluding shootout wins; denoted by ROW).
4. Greater number of total wins (including shootouts).
5. Greater number of points earned in head-to-head play; if teams played an uneven number of head-to-head games, the result of the first game on the home ice of the team with the extra home game is discarded.
6. Greater goal differential (difference between goals for and goals against).
7. Greater number of goals scored (denoted by GF).

== Schedule and results ==
=== Preseason ===
The preseason schedule was published on June 13, 2019.

2019 preseason game log: 4–1–1 (Home: 3–0–0; Road: 1–1–1)
#	Date	Visitor	Score	Home	OT	Decision	Attendance	Record	Recap
1	September 17	Anaheim	4–3	San Jose		Stolarz	12,981	1–0–0
2	September 21	Anaheim	3–4	Arizona	SO	Boyle	—	1–0–1
3	September 23	Anaheim	0–3	Los Angeles		Miller	12,746	1–1–1
4	September 24	San Jose	1–4	Anaheim		Gibson	13,566	2–1–1
5	September 25	Los Angeles	0–2	Anaheim		Miller	12,410	3–1–1
6	September 28	Arizona	1–2	Anaheim		Miller	15,105	4–1–1

=== Regular season ===
The regular season schedule was released on June 25, 2019.

2019–20 game log

October: 8–6–0 (Home: 5–1–0; Road: 3–5–0)
#	Date	Visitor	Score	Home	OT	Decision	Attendance	Record	Pts	Recap
1	October 3	Arizona	1–2	Anaheim		Gibson	17,174	1–0–0	2
2	October 5	San Jose	1–3	Anaheim		Gibson	15,795	2–0–0	4
3	October 8	Anaheim	3–1	Detroit		Gibson	18,209	3–0–0	6
4	October 10	Anaheim	1–2	Pittsburgh		Gibson	18,414	3–1–0	6
5	October 11	Anaheim	2–1	Columbus		Miller	15,368	4–1–0	8
6	October 14	Anaheim	2–4	Boston		Gibson	17,193	4–2–0	8
7	October 16	Buffalo	2–5	Anaheim		Gibson	15,193	5–2–0	10
8	October 18	Carolina	2–4	Anaheim		Miller	14,755	6–2–0	12
9	October 20	Calgary	2–1	Anaheim		Gibson	15,690	6–3–0	12
10	October 22	Anaheim	1–6	Nashville		Gibson	17,424	6–4–0	12
11	October 24	Anaheim	1–2	Dallas		Gibson	17,754	6–5–0	12
12	October 26	Anaheim	5–2	Colorado		Miller	18,039	7–5–0	14
13	October 27	Anaheim	2–5	Vegas		Gibson	18,110	7–6–0	14
14	October 29	Winnipeg	4–7	Anaheim		Gibson	15,171	8–6–0	16

November: 3–6–4 (Home: 2–4–2; Road: 1–2–2)
#	Date	Visitor	Score	Home	OT	Decision	Attendance	Record	Pts	Recap
15	November 1	Vancouver	1–2	Anaheim	OT	Gibson	15,173	9–6–0	18
16	November 3	Chicago	3–2	Anaheim	OT	Miller	15,576	9–6–1	19
17	November 5	Minnesota	4–2	Anaheim		Gibson	15,526	9–7–1	19
18	November 10	Edmonton	6–2	Anaheim		Gibson	16,463	9–8–1	19
19	November 12	Detroit	4–3	Anaheim	OT	Miller	15,046	9–8–2	20
20	November 14	San Jose	5–3	Anaheim		Gibson	16,007	9–9–2	20
21	November 16	Anaheim	4–1	St. Louis		Gibson	18,096	10–9–2	22
22	November 18	Anaheim	2–5	Washington		Gibson	18,573	10–10–2	22
23	November 21	Anaheim	4–5	Florida	OT	Gibson	11,316	10–10–3	23
24	November 23	Anaheim	2–6	Tampa Bay		Miller	19,092	10–11–3	23
25	November 25	NY Islanders	0–3	Anaheim		Gibson	16,269	11–11–3	25
26	November 27	Anaheim	3–4	Arizona	SO	Gibson	14,741	11–11–4	26
27	November 29	Winnipeg	3–0	Anaheim		Gibson	16,301	11–12–4	26

December: 5–7–1 (Home: 3–2–1; Road: 2–5–0)
#	Date	Visitor	Score	Home	OT	Decision	Attendance	Record	Pts	Recap
28	December 2	Los Angeles	2–4	Anaheim		Miller	15,434	12–12–4	28
29	December 6	Washington	3–2	Anaheim		Miller	15,945	12–13–4	28
30	December 8	Anaheim	2–3	Winnipeg		Gibson	15,325	12–14–4	28
31	December 10	Anaheim	3–2	Minnesota	SO	Gibson	17,154	13–14–4	30
32	December 12	Los Angeles	2–1	Anaheim		Gibson	16,008	13–15–4	30
33	December 14	NY Rangers	3–4	Anaheim	SO	Gibson	14,707	14–15–4	32
34	December 17	Anaheim	1–4	Philadelphia		Gibson	18,449	14–16–4	32
35	December 18	Anaheim	1–3	New Jersey		Miller	13,936	14–17–4	32
36	December 21	Anaheim	6–5	NY Islanders	SO	Gibson	13,917	15–17–4	34
37	December 22	Anaheim	1–5	NY Rangers		Miller	17,465	15–18–4	34
38	December 27	Vegas	3–4	Anaheim		Gibson	16,601	16–18–4	36
39	December 29	Philadelphia	2–1	Anaheim	OT	Gibson	16,238	16–18–5	37
40	December 31	Anaheim	2–5	Vegas		Gibson	18,320	16–19–5	37

January: 4–7–0 (Home: 2–3–0; Road: 2–4–0)
#	Date	Visitor	Score	Home	OT	Decision	Attendance	Record	Pts	Recap
41	January 2	Anaheim	2–4	Arizona		Gibson	14,651	16–20–5	37
42	January 5	Nashville	4–5	Anaheim	SO	Gibson	15,858	17–20–5	39
43	January 7	Columbus	4–3	Anaheim		Miller	16,153	17–21–5	39
44	January 9	Dallas	3–0	Anaheim		Gibson	15,419	17–22–5	39
45	January 11	Anaheim	2–4	Chicago		Gibson	21,548	17–23–5	39
46	January 13	Anaheim	1–4	St. Louis		Gibson	18,096	17–24–5	39
47	January 16	Anaheim	4–2	Nashville		Gibson	17,388	18–24–5	41
48	January 17	Anaheim	2–1	Carolina	OT	Miller	16,913	19–24–5	43
49	January 27	Anaheim	2–4	San Jose		Gibson	16,571	19–25–5	43
50	January 29	Arizona	2–4	Anaheim		Gibson	16,730	20–25–5	45
51	January 31	Tampa Bay	4–3	Anaheim		Gibson	16,032	20–26–5	45

February: 6–4–3 (Home: 2–3–1; Road: 4–1–2)
#	Date	Visitor	Score	Home	OT	Decision	Attendance	Record	Pts	Recap
52	February 1	Anaheim	3–1	Los Angeles		Miller	18,230	21–26–5	47
53	February 4	Anaheim	3–2	Ottawa	SO	Gibson	9,238	22–26–5	49
54	February 6	Anaheim	2–3	Montreal	OT	Gibson	20,896	22–26–6	50
55	February 7	Anaheim	4–5	Toronto	OT	Miller	19,077	22–26–7	51
56	February 9	Anaheim	3–2	Buffalo		Miller	16,131	23–26–7	53
–	February 11	St. Louis		Anaheim	Game rescheduled to March 11 due to a medical emergency.
57	February 13	Calgary	6–0	Anaheim		Gibson	16,212	23–27–7	53
58	February 16	Anaheim	5–1	Vancouver		Gibson	18,871	24–27–7	55
59	February 17	Anaheim	4–6	Calgary		Miller	19,116	24–28–7	55
60	February 19	Florida	4–1	Anaheim		Gibson	15,716	24–29–7	55
61	February 21	Colorado	1–0	Anaheim		Gibson	16,742	24–30–7	55
62	February 23	Vegas	6–5	Anaheim	OT	Gibson	15,171	24–30–8	56
63	February 25	Edmonton	3–4	Anaheim	OT	Gibson	15,431	25–30–8	58
64	February 28	Pittsburgh	2–3	Anaheim		Gibson	16,588	26–30–8	60

March: 3–3–1 (Home: 2–2–1; Road: 1–1–0)
#	Date	Visitor	Score	Home	OT	Decision	Attendance	Record	Pts	Recap
65	March 1	New Jersey	3–0	Anaheim		Gibson	16,195	26–31–8	60
66	March 3	Anaheim	2–6	Chicago		Gibson	21,345	26–32–8	60
67	March 4	Anaheim	4–3	Colorado	OT	Miller	18,033	27–32–8	62
68	March 6	Toronto	1–2	Anaheim		Gibson	15,984	28–32–8	64
69	March 8	Minnesota	5–4	Anaheim	OT	Miller	15,948	28–32–9	65
70	March 10	Ottawa	2–5	Anaheim		Miller	15,044	29–32–9	67
71	March 11	St. Louis	4–2	Anaheim		Stolarz	16,195	29–33–9	67

Cancelled games
#	Date	Visitor	Home
72	March 14	Anaheim	Los Angeles
73	March 15	Montreal	Anaheim
74	March 18	Boston	Anaheim
75	March 20	Vancouver	Anaheim
76	March 23	Anaheim	Edmonton
77	March 25	Anaheim	Calgary
78	March 28	Anaheim	Vancouver
79	March 29	Anaheim	Edmonton
80	April 1	Dallas	Anaheim
81	April 3	Los Angeles	Anaheim
82	April 4	Anaheim	San Jose

Legend: Win (2 points) Loss (0 points) Overtime/shootout loss (1 point)

== Player statistics ==
=== Skaters ===
Regular season
Player	GP	G	A	Pts	+/−	PIM
Adam Henrique	71	26	17	43	−2	22
Rickard Rakell	65	15	27	42	−5	12
Ryan Getzlaf	69	13	29	42	−16	58
Jakob Silfverberg	66	21	18	39	0	14
Cam Fowler	59	9	20	29	0	20
Ondrej Kase^{‡}	49	7	16	23	−7	10
Sam Steel	65	6	16	22	−13	20
Hampus Lindholm	55	2	20	22	−10	34
Derek Grant^{‡}	49	14	6	20	−1	28
Nick Ritchie^{‡}	41	8	11	19	3	78
Carter Rowney	71	8	11	19	5	14
Troy Terry	47	4	11	15	−5	6
Michael Del Zotto	49	2	13	15	5	14
Nicolas Deslauriers	59	7	6	13	−1	92
Max Jones	59	8	4	12	−6	36
Max Comtois	29	5	6	11	−4	24
Jacob Larsson	60	2	9	11	−9	12
Devin Shore^{‡}	39	4	6	10	−8	8
Erik Gudbranson^{†}	44	4	5	9	0	91
Josh Manson	50	1	8	9	−10	37
Brendan Guhle	30	4	4	8	−2	10
Sonny Milano^{†}	9	2	3	5	−2	4
Danton Heinen^{†}	9	3	1	4	−5	2
Korbinian Holzer^{‡}	46	1	3	4	−1	35
Josh Mahura	11	1	3	4	−3	2
Isac Lundestrom	15	0	4	4	−2	0
Christian Djoos^{†}	9	1	2	3	2	0
David Backes^{†}	6	0	3	3	1	6
Daniel Sprong^{‡}	8	1	1	2	−2	0
Sam Carrick	9	1	1	2	−3	0
Jani Hakanpaa	5	1	0	1	1	2
Andrew Agozzino^{†}	5	1	0	1	3	0
Matt Irwin^{†}	9	0	1	1	−7	4
Kiefer Sherwood	10	0	1	1	−1	6
Chase De Leo	1	0	0	0	0	0

=== Goaltenders ===
Regular season
Player	GP	GS	TOI	W	L	OT	GA	GAA	SA	SV%	SO	G	A	PIM
John Gibson	51	51	2,981:17	20	26	5	149	3.00	1,552	.904	1	0	0	6
Ryan Miller	23	19	1,238:14	9	6	4	64	3.10	685	.907	0	0	1	0
Anthony Stolarz	1	1	58:33	0	1	0	2	2.05	35	.944	0	0	0	0

^{†}Denotes player spent time with another team before joining the Ducks. Stats reflect time with the Ducks only.
^{‡}Denotes player was traded mid-season. Stats reflect time with the Ducks only.
Bold/italics denotes franchise record.
