= 2019–20 Florida Panthers season =

Season of play of professional ice hockey team

2019–20 Florida Panthers
- Division: 4th Atlantic
- Conference: 10th Eastern
- 2019–20 record: 35–26–8
- Home record: 17–14–4
- Road record: 18–12–4
- Goals for: 231
- Goals against: 228

Team information
- General manager: Dale Tallon
- Coach: Joel Quenneville
- Captain: Aleksander Barkov
- Alternate captains: Aaron Ekblad; Jonathan Huberdeau; Vincent Trocheck (Oct. 3 – Feb. 24); Keith Yandle
- Arena: BB&T Center
- Average attendance: 14,104
- Minor league affiliate: Springfield Thunderbirds (AHL)

Team leaders
- Goals: Mike Hoffman (29)
- Assists: Jonathan Huberdeau (55)
- Points: Jonathan Huberdeau (78)
- Penalty minutes: Josh Brown (39)
- Plus/minus: Aaron Ekblad (+12)
- Wins: Sergei Bobrovsky (23)
- Goals against average: Chris Driedger (2.05)

The 2019–20 Florida Panthers season was the 26th season for the National Hockey League (NHL) franchise that was established on June 14, 1993. It is their first season under head coach Joel Quenneville.

The season was suspended by the league officials on March 12, 2020, after several other professional and collegiate sports organizations followed suit as a result of the ongoing COVID-19 pandemic. On May 26, the NHL regular season was officially declared over with the remaining games being cancelled. The Panthers advanced to the playoffs for the first time since the 2015–16 season and lost in four games to the New York Islanders in the qualifying round.

== Standings ==
=== Divisional standings ===
Atlantic Division
Pos	Team	GP	W	L	OTL	RW	GF	GA	GD	Pts
1	p – Boston Bruins	70	44	14	12	38	227	174	+53	100
2	Tampa Bay Lightning	70	43	21	6	35	245	195	+50	92
3	Toronto Maple Leafs	70	36	25	9	28	238	227	+11	81
4	Florida Panthers	69	35	26	8	30	231	228	+3	78
5	Montreal Canadiens	71	31	31	9	19	212	221	−9	71
6	Buffalo Sabres	69	30	31	8	22	195	217	−22	68
7	Ottawa Senators	71	25	34	12	18	191	243	−52	62
8	Detroit Red Wings	71	17	49	5	13	145	267	−122	39

Source: National Hockey League
p – Clinched Presidents' Trophy

=== Eastern Conference ===
Pos	Team	GP	W	L	OTL	RW	GF	GA	GD	PCT	Qualification
1	Boston Bruins	70	44	14	12	38	227	174	+53	.714	Advance to Seeding round-robin tournament
2	Tampa Bay Lightning	70	43	21	6	35	245	195	+50	.657	Advance to Seeding round-robin tournament
3	Washington Capitals	69	41	20	8	31	240	215	+25	.652	Advance to Seeding round-robin tournament
4	Philadelphia Flyers	69	41	21	7	31	232	196	+36	.645	Advance to Seeding round-robin tournament
5	Pittsburgh Penguins	69	40	23	6	29	224	196	+28	.623	Advance to 2020 Stanley Cup playoffs qualifying round
6	Carolina Hurricanes	68	38	25	5	27	222	193	+29	.596	Advance to 2020 Stanley Cup playoffs qualifying round
7	New York Islanders	68	35	23	10	24	192	193	−1	.588	Advance to 2020 Stanley Cup playoffs qualifying round
8	Toronto Maple Leafs	70	36	25	9	28	238	227	+11	.579	Advance to 2020 Stanley Cup playoffs qualifying round
9	Columbus Blue Jackets	70	33	22	15	25	180	187	−7	.579	Advance to 2020 Stanley Cup playoffs qualifying round
10	Florida Panthers	69	35	26	8	30	231	228	+3	.565	Advance to 2020 Stanley Cup playoffs qualifying round
11	New York Rangers	70	37	28	5	31	234	222	+12	.564	Advance to 2020 Stanley Cup playoffs qualifying round
12	Montreal Canadiens	71	31	31	9	19	212	221	−9	.500	Advance to 2020 Stanley Cup playoffs qualifying round
13	Buffalo Sabres	69	30	31	8	22	195	217	−22	.493	
14	New Jersey Devils	69	28	29	12	22	189	230	−41	.493	
15	Ottawa Senators	71	25	34	12	18	191	243	−52	.437	
16	Detroit Red Wings	71	17	49	5	13	145	267	−122	.275	

Source: National Hockey League

== Schedule and results ==
=== Preseason ===
The preseason schedule was published on June 12, 2019.

2019 preseason game log: 3–4–1 (Home: 1–1–0; Road: 2–3–1)
#	Date	Visitor	Score	Home	OT	Decision	Attendance	Record	Recap
1^{[A]}	September 16	Florida	3–6	Nashville		Desrosiers	—	0–1–0
2^{[A]}	September 16	Florida	0–1	Nashville		Bednard	17,200	0–2–0
3^{[a]}	September 18	Florida	3–4	Montreal		Driedger	—	0–3–0
4	September 19	Florida	4–5	Montreal	SO	Montembeault	19,101	0–3–1
5^{[b]}	September 21	Florida	6–0	Dallas		Montembeault	—	1–3–1
6	September 24	Tampa Bay	3–6	Florida		Bobrovsky	8,744	2–3–1
7	September 26	Tampa Bay	4–2	Florida		Bobrovsky	8,611	2–4–1
8	September 28	Florida	1–0	Tampa Bay	SO	Bobrovsky	14,732	3–4–1
Notes:^{A} Indicates split-squad.^{a} Game was played at K. C. Irving Regional Centre in Bathurst, New Brunswick as part of Kraft Hockeyville.^{b} Game was played at BOK Center in Tulsa, Oklahoma.

=== Regular season ===
The regular season schedule was published on June 25, 2019.

2019–20 game log

October: 6–3–4 (Home: 2–1–1; Road: 4–2–3)
#	Date	Visitor	Score	Home	OT	Decision	Attendance	Record	Pts	Recap
1	October 3	Florida	2–5	Tampa Bay		Bobrovsky	19,092	0–1–0	0
2	October 5	Tampa Bay	3–4	Florida		Bobrovsky	17,424	1–1–0	2
3	October 8	Carolina	6–3	Florida		Bobrovsky	11,638	1–2–0	2
4	October 11	Florida	2–3	Buffalo	SO	Bobrovsky	15,638	1–2–1	3
5	October 12	Florida	2–3	NY Islanders	SO	Montembeault	11,421	1–2–2	4
6	October 14	Florida	6–4	New Jersey		Bobrovsky	13,208	2–2–2	6
7	October 18	Colorado	5–4	Florida	OT	Bobrovsky	13,382	2–2–3	7
8	October 19	Florida	3–2	Nashville	SO	Montembeault	17,534	3–2–3	9
9	October 22	Pittsburgh	2–4	Florida		Bobrovsky	12,738	4–2–3	11
10	October 24	Florida	5–6	Calgary	SO	Bobrovsky	18,011	4–2–4	12
11	October 27	Florida	6–2	Edmonton		Bobrovsky	17,278	5–2–4	14
12	October 28	Florida	2–7	Vancouver		Montembeault	17,864	5–3–4	14
13	October 30	Florida	4–3	Colorado	OT	Bobrovsky	16,022	6–3–4	16

November: 7–5–1 (Home: 5–2–1; Road: 2–3–0)
#	Date	Visitor	Score	Home	OT	Decision	Attendance	Record	Pts	Recap
14	November 2	Detroit	0–4	Florida		Bobrovsky	14,411	7–3–4	18
15	November 7	Washington	5–4	Florida	OT	Bobrovsky	14,085	7–3–5	19
16	November 9	Florida	1–2	NY Islanders		Bobrovsky	13,100	7–4–5	19
17	November 10	Florida	6–5	NY Rangers	SO	Montembeault	17,464	8–4–5	21
18	November 12	Florida	5–4	Boston	SO	Montembeault	17,850	9–4–5	23
19	November 14	Winnipeg	4–3	Florida		Bobrovsky	12,190	9–5–5	23
20	November 16	NY Rangers	3–4	Florida		Bobrovsky	16,512	10–5–5	25
21	November 19	Philadelphia	2–5	Florida		Bobrovsky	11,515	11–5–5	27
22	November 21	Anaheim	4–5	Florida	OT	Bobrovsky	11,316	12–5–5	29
23	November 23	Florida	2–4	Carolina		Bobrovsky	18,159	12–6–5	29
24	November 24	Buffalo	5–2	Florida		Montembeault	14,443	12–7–5	29
25	November 27	Florida	3–4	Washington		Bobrovsky	18,573	12–8–5	29
26	November 30	Nashville	0–3	Florida		Driedger	14,285	13–8–5	31

December: 7–6–0 (Home: 5–4–0; Road: 2–2–0)
#	Date	Visitor	Score	Home	OT	Decision	Attendance	Record	Pts	Recap
27	December 3	Minnesota	4–2	Florida		Driedger	10,167	13–9–5	31
28	December 7	Columbus	1–4	Florida		Bobrovsky	11,640	14–9–5	33
29	December 8	San Jose	1–5	Florida		Bobrovsky	11,340	15–9–5	35
30	December 10	Tampa Bay	2–1	Florida		Bobrovsky	10,685	15–10–5	35
31	December 12	NY Islanders	3–1	Florida		Bobrovsky	12,609	15–11–5	35
32	December 14	Boston	4–2	Florida		Bobrovsky	15,157	15–12–5	35
33	December 16	Ottawa	1–6	Florida		Bobrovsky	10,448	16–12–5	37
34	December 20	Dallas	4–7	Florida		Bobrovsky	14,040	17–12–5	39
35	December 21	Florida	4–2	Carolina		Driedger	18,224	18–12–5	41
36	December 23	Florida	1–6	Tampa Bay		Bobrovsky	19,092	18–13–5	41
37	December 28	Detroit	4–5	Florida		Driedger	17,731	19–13–5	43
38	December 29	Montreal	5–6	Florida		Bobrovsky	19,651	20–13–5	45
39	December 31	Florida	1–4	Columbus		Bobrovsky	18,977	20–14–5	45

January: 8–2–0 (Home: 3–1–0; Road: 5–1–0)
#	Date	Visitor	Score	Home	OT	Decision	Attendance	Record	Pts	Recap
40	January 2	Florida	6–3	Ottawa		Bobrovsky	10,991	21–14–5	47
41	January 4	Florida	2–3	Buffalo		Bobrovsky	17,731	21–15–5	47
42	January 5	Florida	4–1	Pittsburgh		Driedger	18,564	22–15–5	49
43	January 7	Arizona	5–2	Florida		Driedger	12,120	22–16–5	49
44	January 9	Vancouver	2–5	Florida		Bobrovsky	12,648	23–16–5	51
45	January 12	Toronto	4–8	Florida		Driedger	15,535	24–16–5	53
46	January 16	Los Angeles	3–4	Florida		Montembeault	12,575	25–16–5	55
47	January 18	Florida	4–1	Detroit		Bobrovsky	19,231	26–16–5	57
48	January 20	Florida	5–4	Minnesota		Bobrovsky	17,255	27–16–5	59
49	January 21	Florida	4–3	Chicago		Bobrovsky	21,559	28–16–5	61

February: 5–9–2 (Home: 0–5–1; Road: 5–4–1)
#	Date	Visitor	Score	Home	OT	Decision	Attendance	Record	Pts	Recap
50	February 1	Florida	0–4	Montreal		Bobrovsky	21,302	28–17–5	61
51	February 3	Florida	5–3	Toronto		Bobrovsky	19,156	29–17–5	63
52	February 4	Florida	0–1	Columbus	OT	Bobrovsky	17,811	29–17–6	64
53	February 6	Vegas	7–2	Florida		Bobrovsky	15,057	29–18–6	64
54	February 8	Pittsburgh	3–2	Florida		Bobrovsky	17,773	29–19–6	64
55	February 10	Florida	1–4	Philadelphia		Bobrovsky	17,867	29–20–6	64
56	February 11	Florida	5–3	New Jersey		Montembeault	12,732	30–20–6	66
57	February 13	Philadelphia	6–2	Florida		Bobrovsky	15,556	30–21–6	66
58	February 15	Edmonton	4–1	Florida		Montembeault	15,069	30–22–6	66
59	February 17	Florida	5–3	San Jose		Bobrovsky	16,510	31–22–6	68
60	February 19	Florida	4–1	Anaheim		Bobrovsky	15,716	32–22–6	70
61	February 20	Florida	4–5	Los Angeles		Bobrovsky	16,911	32–23–6	70
62	February 22	Florida	3–5	Vegas		Montembeault	18,480	32–24–6	70
63	February 25	Florida	2–1	Arizona		Bobrovsky	12,391	33–24–6	72
64	February 27	Toronto	5–3	Florida		Bobrovsky	16,322	33–25–6	72
65	February 29	Chicago	3–2	Florida	SO	Bobrovsky	16,055	33–25–7	73

March: 2–1–1 (Home: 1–1–1; Road: 1–0–0)
#	Date	Visitor	Score	Home	OT	Decision	Attendance	Record	Pts	Recap
66	March 1	Calgary	3–0	Florida		Montembeault	14,104	33–26–7	73
67	March 5	Boston	2–1	Florida	OT	Driedger	15,577	33–26–8	74
68	March 7	Montreal	1–4	Florida		Driedger	17,873	34–26–8	76
69	March 9	Florida	2–1	St. Louis		Driedger	18,096	35–26–8	78

Cancelled games
#	Date	Visitor	Home
70	March 12	Florida	Dallas
71	March 14	New Jersey	Florida
72	March 16	Florida	Detroit
73	March 17	Florida	Winnipeg
74	March 19	Buffalo	Florida
75	March 21	St. Louis	Florida
76	March 23	Florida	Toronto
77	March 24	Florida	Ottawa
78	March 26	Florida	Montreal
79	March 28	Florida	Boston
80	March 30	NY Rangers	Florida
81	April 2	Ottawa	Florida
82	April 4	Washington	Florida

Legend: Win (2 points) Loss (0 points) Overtime/shootout loss (1 point)

=== Playoffs ===
The Panthers faced the New York Islanders in the qualifying round, where they were defeated in four games.

2020 Stanley Cup playoffs

Eastern Conference Qualifying Round vs. (7) New York Islanders: New York won 3–1
#	Date	Visitor	Score	Home	OT	Decision	Series	Recap
1	August 1	Florida	1–2	NY Islanders		Bobrovsky	0–1
2	August 4	Florida	2–4	NY Islanders		Bobrovsky	0–2
3	August 5	NY Islanders	2–3	Florida		Bobrovsky	1–2
4	August 7	NY Islanders	5–1	Florida		Bobrovsky	1–3

Legend: Win Loss

== Player statistics ==
=== Skaters ===
Regular season
Player	GP	G	A	Pts	+/−	PIM
Jonathan Huberdeau	69	23	55	78	5	30
Aleksander Barkov	66	20	42	62	2	18
Mike Hoffman	69	29	30	59	−5	28
Evgenii Dadonov	69	25	22	47	−7	10
Keith Yandle	69	5	40	45	0	20
Aaron Ekblad	67	5	36	41	12	26
Vincent Trocheck^{‡}	55	10	26	36	−3	33
Frank Vatrano	69	16	18	34	−8	30
Brett Connolly	69	19	14	33	−3	26
Noel Acciari	66	20	7	27	2	21
Mike Matheson	59	8	12	20	−1	14
Anton Stralman	69	5	14	19	−6	14
Mark Pysyk	58	9	9	18	4	20
MacKenzie Weegar	45	7	11	18	6	33
Colton Sceviour	69	6	10	16	2	6
Brian Boyle	39	6	9	15	−5	17
Denis Malgin^{‡}	36	4	8	12	−6	12
Dominic Toninato	46	4	7	11	4	37
Josh Brown	56	3	5	8	1	39
Riley Stillman	34	0	5	5	−3	14
Aleksi Saarela	9	2	2	4	2	0
Dryden Hunt	21	0	4	4	0	24
Jayce Hawryluk	15	1	2	3	−1	8
Lucas Wallmark^{†}	7	1	1	2	0	0
Erik Haula^{†}	7	0	2	2	0	2
Henrik Borgstrom	4	0	0	0	−2	2

Playoffs
Player	GP	G	A	Pts	+/−	PIM
Mike Hoffman	4	3	2	5	−1	4
Aleksander Barkov	4	1	3	4	0	2
Jonathan Huberdeau	4	1	2	3	0	2
Keith Yandle	4	0	3	3	−2	0
Brian Boyle	4	1	0	1	−1	12
Erik Haula	4	1	0	1	−3	0
Evgenii Dadonov	4	0	1	1	1	2
MacKenzie Weegar	4	0	1	1	1	4
Riley Stillman	3	0	0	0	−3	0
Noel Acciari	4	0	0	0	−3	0
Dryden Hunt	2	0	0	0	1	0
Lucas Wallmark	2	0	0	0	−1	2
Aaron Ekblad	4	0	0	0	0	2
Josh Brown	2	0	0	0	0	0
Dominic Toninato	3	0	0	0	−3	0
Mark Pysyk	4	0	0	0	−1	0
Brett Connolly	4	0	0	0	−5	2
Anton Stralman	4	0	0	0	−5	2
Brady Keeper	1	0	0	0	−1	0
Aleksi Saarela	1	0	0	0	0	0
Frank Vatrano	2	0	0	0	−2	2
Mike Matheson	2	0	0	0	−2	8
Colton Sceviour	2	0	0	0	−1	0

=== Goaltenders ===
Regular season
Player	GP	GS	TOI	W	L	OT	GA	GAA	SA	SV%	SO	G	A	PIM
Sergei Bobrovsky	50	49	2,805:59	23	19	6	151	3.23	1,505	.900	1	0	0	0
Chris Driedger	12	11	642:40	7	2	1	22	2.05	354	.938	1	0	0	0
Sam Montembeault	14	9	700:45	5	5	1	39	3.34	356	.890	0	0	0	0

Playoffs
Player	GP	GS	TOI	W	L	GA	GAA	SA	SV%	SO	G	A	PIM
Sergei Bobrovsky	4	4	234:23	1	3	12	3.07	121	.901	0	0	0	0

^{†}Denotes player spent time with another team before joining the Panthers. Stats reflect time with the Panthers only.
^{‡}Denotes player was traded mid-season. Stats reflect time with the Panthers only.
Bold/italics denotes franchise record.

== Transactions ==
The Panthers have been involved in the following transactions during the 2019–20 season.

=== Contract terminations ===
Date	Player	Via	Ref
July 7, 2019	Scott Darling		

=== Retirement ===
Date	Player	Ref
June 26, 2019	Roberto Luongo	
