= 2019–20 Arizona Coyotes season =

NHL hockey team season

2019–20 Arizona Coyotes
- Division: 5th Pacific
- Conference: 11th Western
- 2019–20 record: 33–29–8
- Home record: 17–12–4
- Road record: 16–17–4
- Goals for: 195
- Goals against: 187

Team information
- General manager: John Chayka (Oct. 3 – Jul. 26); Steve Sullivan (interim, Jul. 26 – Aug. 19)
- Coach: Rick Tocchet
- Captain: Oliver Ekman-Larsson
- Alternate captains: Niklas Hjalmarsson; Phil Kessel; Derek Stepan
- Arena: Gila River Arena
- Average attendance: 14,605
- Minor league affiliates: Tucson Roadrunners (AHL); Rapid City Rush (ECHL)

Team leaders
- Goals: Conor Garland (22)
- Assists: Nick Schmaltz (34)
- Points: Nick Schmaltz (45)
- Penalty minutes: Jakob Chychrun; Oliver Ekman-Larsson (38)
- Plus/minus: Alex Goligoski (+8)
- Wins: Darcy Kuemper (16)
- Goals against average: Darcy Kuemper (2.22)

The 2019–20 Arizona Coyotes season was the 41st season for the National Hockey League (NHL) franchise that was established on June 22, 1979, the 24th season since the franchise relocated from Winnipeg following the 1995–96 NHL season, and the 48th overall, including the World Hockey Association years.

The season was suspended by the league officials on March 12, 2020, after several other professional and collegiate sports organizations followed suit as a result of the ongoing COVID-19 pandemic. On May 26, the NHL regular season was officially declared over with the remaining games being cancelled. The Coyotes qualified for the playoffs for the first time since the 2011–12 season, ending the second longest playoff drought in the NHL, and longest in the Western Conference. The team defeated the Nashville Predators in the qualifying round for their first series win since 2012, but were defeated in the first round by the Colorado Avalanche in five games.

Due to the pandemic, this was the Coyotes' final season in the Pacific Division. The following season saw the Coyotes moved to the temporarily reformed West Division. As per the league's previously agreed realignment, the team returned to the Central Division in 2021 to make room for the expansion Seattle Kraken. Due to suspending operations in 2024, this was the last season the Coyotes made the playoffs and won a playoff series.

== Standings ==
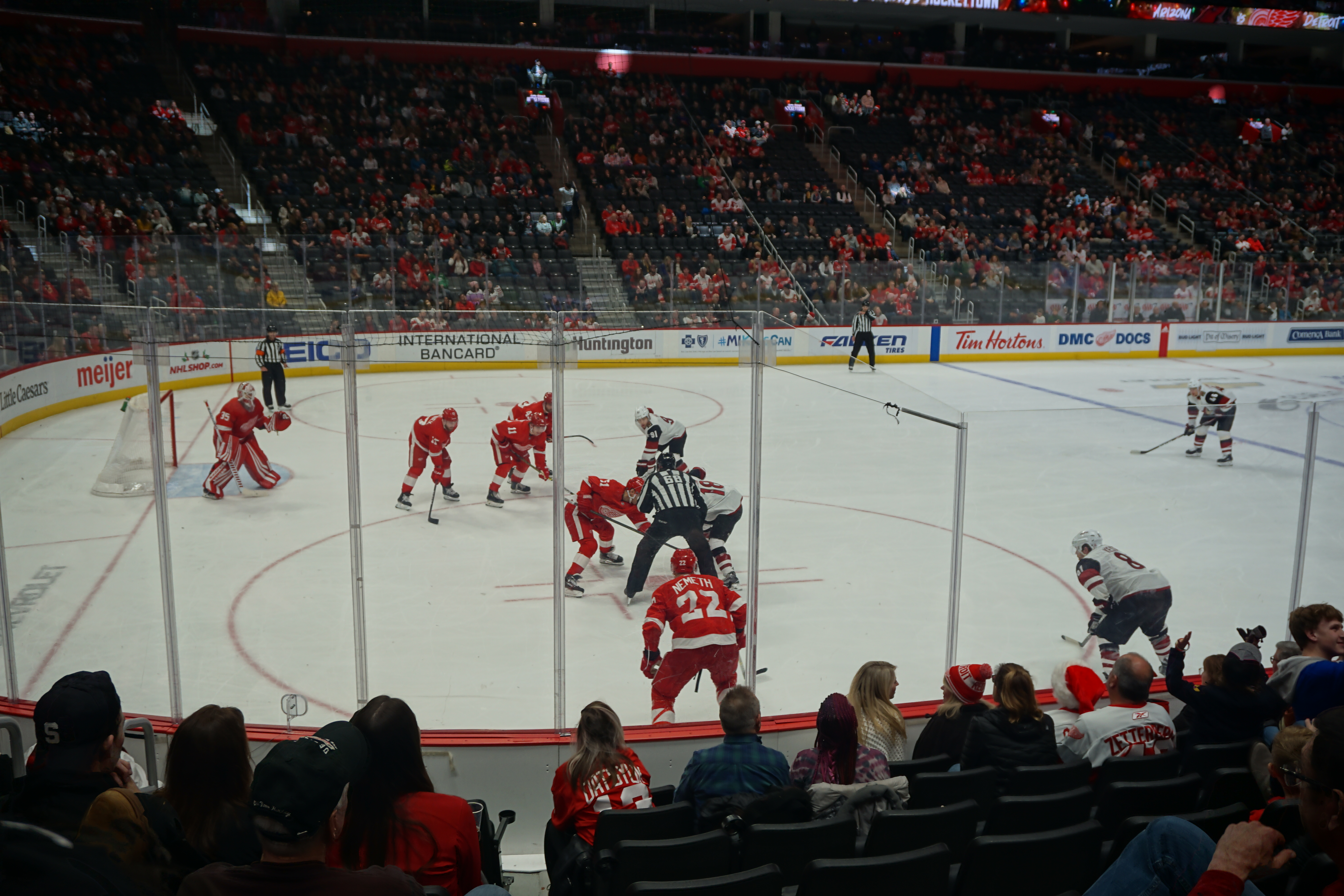
Arizona in action at Detroit in December 2019

=== Divisional standings ===
Pacific Division
Pos	Team	GP	W	L	OTL	RW	GF	GA	GD	Pts
1	Vegas Golden Knights	71	39	24	8	30	227	211	+16	86
2	Edmonton Oilers	71	37	25	9	31	225	217	+8	83
3	Calgary Flames	70	36	27	7	25	210	215	−5	79
4	Vancouver Canucks	69	36	27	6	27	228	217	+11	78
5	Arizona Coyotes	70	33	29	8	26	195	187	+8	74
6	Anaheim Ducks	71	29	33	9	20	187	226	−39	67
7	Los Angeles Kings	70	29	35	6	21	178	212	−34	64
8	San Jose Sharks	70	29	36	5	22	182	226	−44	63

Source: National Hockey League

=== Western Conference ===
Pos	Team	GP	W	L	OTL	RW	GF	GA	GD	PCT	Qualification
1	St. Louis Blues	71	42	19	10	33	225	193	+32	.662	Advance to Seeding round-robin tournament
2	Colorado Avalanche	70	42	20	8	37	237	191	+46	.657	Advance to Seeding round-robin tournament
3	Vegas Golden Knights	71	39	24	8	30	227	211	+16	.606	Advance to Seeding round-robin tournament
4	Dallas Stars	69	37	24	8	26	180	177	+3	.594	Advance to Seeding round-robin tournament
5	Edmonton Oilers	71	37	25	9	31	225	217	+8	.585	Advance to 2020 Stanley Cup playoffs qualifying round
6	Nashville Predators	69	35	26	8	28	215	217	−2	.565	Advance to 2020 Stanley Cup playoffs qualifying round
7	Vancouver Canucks	69	36	27	6	27	228	217	+11	.565	Advance to 2020 Stanley Cup playoffs qualifying round
8	Calgary Flames	70	36	27	7	25	210	215	−5	.564	Advance to 2020 Stanley Cup playoffs qualifying round
9	Winnipeg Jets	71	37	28	6	30	216	203	+13	.563	Advance to 2020 Stanley Cup playoffs qualifying round
10	Minnesota Wild	69	35	27	7	30	220	220	0	.558	Advance to 2020 Stanley Cup playoffs qualifying round
11	Arizona Coyotes	70	33	29	8	26	195	187	+8	.529	Advance to 2020 Stanley Cup playoffs qualifying round
12	Chicago Blackhawks	70	32	30	8	23	212	218	−6	.514	Advance to 2020 Stanley Cup playoffs qualifying round
13	Anaheim Ducks	71	29	33	9	20	187	226	−39	.472	
14	Los Angeles Kings	70	29	35	6	21	178	212	−34	.457	
15	San Jose Sharks	70	29	36	5	22	182	226	−44	.450	

Source: National Hockey League

Tiebreaking procedures

1. Fewer number of games played (only used during regular season).
2. Greater number of regulation wins (denoted by RW).
3. Greater number of wins in regulation and overtime (excluding shootout wins; denoted by ROW).
4. Greater number of total wins (including shootouts).
5. Greater number of points earned in head-to-head play; if teams played an uneven number of head-to-head games, the result of the first game on the home ice of the team with the extra home game is discarded.
6. Greater goal differential (difference between goals for and goals against).
7. Greater number of goals scored (denoted by GF).

== Schedule and results ==
=== Preseason ===
The preseason schedule was published on June 13, 2019.

2019 preseason game log: 4–3–0 (Home: 1–1–0; Road: 3–2–0)
#	Date	Visitor	Score	Home	OT	Decision	Attendance	Record	Recap
1	September 15	Arizona	2–6	Vegas		Hill	17,767	0–1–0
2^{[A]}	September 17	Los Angeles	4–1	Arizona		Raanta	–	0–2–0
3^{[A]}	September 17	Arizona	5–0	Los Angeles		Kuemper	8,133	1–2–0
4	September 21	Anaheim	3–4	Arizona	SO	Kuemper	–	2–2–0
5	September 24	Arizona	4–2	Edmonton		Hill	15,976	3–2–0
6	September 26	Arizona	4–2	Vancouver		Hill	18,528	4–2–0
7	September 28	Arizona	1–2	Anaheim		Kuemper	15,105	4–3–0
Notes:^{A} Indicates split-squad.

=== Regular season ===
The regular season schedule was published on June 25, 2019.

2019–20 game log

October: 7–4–1 (Home: 3–2–0; Road: 4–2–1)
#	Date	Visitor	Score	Home	OT	Decision	Attendance	Record	Pts	Recap
1	October 3	Arizona	1–2	Anaheim		Kuemper	17,174	0–1–0	0
2	October 5	Boston	1–0	Arizona		Kuemper	17,125	0–2–0	0
3	October 10	Vegas	1–4	Arizona		Kuemper	13,864	1–2–0	2
4	October 12	Arizona	2–3	Colorado	OT	Raanta	18,053	1–2–1	3
5	October 15	Arizona	4–2	Winnipeg		Kuemper	14,764	2–2–1	5
6	October 17	Nashville	2–5	Arizona		Kuemper	13,521	3–2–1	7
7	October 19	Ottawa	2–5	Arizona		Raanta	17,125	4–2–1	9
8	October 22	Arizona	3–2	NY Rangers	OT	Kuemper	17,435	5–2–1	11
9	October 24	Arizona	2–4	NY Islanders		Kuemper	10,752	5–3–1	11
10	October 25	Arizona	5–3	New Jersey		Raanta	14,724	6–3–1	13
11	October 28	Arizona	3–2	Buffalo	SO	Kuemper	15,358	7–3–1	15
12	October 30	Montreal	4–1	Arizona		Raanta	14,004	7–4–1	15

November: 8–5–3 (Home: 4–4–1; Road: 4–1–2)
#	Date	Visitor	Score	Home	OT	Decision	Attendance	Record	Pts	Recap
13	November 2	Colorado	0–3	Arizona		Kuemper	17,125	8–4–1	17
14	November 4	Arizona	3–2	Edmonton	OT	Kuemper	17,105	9–4–1	19
15	November 5	Arizona	3–4	Calgary	OT	Raanta	17,824	9–4–2	20
16	November 7	Columbus	3–2	Arizona		Kuemper	12,115	9–5–2	20
17	November 9	Minnesota	4–3	Arizona		Kuemper	14,428	9–6–2	20
18	November 11	Arizona	4–3	Washington	SO	Raanta	18,573	10–6–2	22
19	November 12	Arizona	3–2	St. Louis	SO	Kuemper	18,096	11–6–2	24
20	November 14	Arizona	2–3	Minnesota		Raanta	17,079	11–7–2	24
21	November 16	Calgary	0–3	Arizona		Kuemper	13,534	12–7–2	26
22	November 18	Los Angeles	0–3	Arizona		Raanta	12,210	13–7–2	28
23	November 21`	Toronto	3–1	Arizona		Kuemper	12,495	13–8–2	28
24	November 23	Arizona	3–2	Los Angeles		Raanta	15,912	14–8–2	30
25	November 24	Edmonton	4–3	Arizona	SO	Kuemper	12,908	14–8–3	31
26	November 27	Anaheim	3–4	Arizona	SO	Kuemper	14,741	15–8–3	33
27	November 29	Arizona	1–2	Vegas	SO	Kuemper	18,326	15–8–4	34
28	November 30	San Jose	4–2	Arizona		Raanta	15,485	15–9–4	34

December: 7–7–0 (Home: 2–4–0; Road: 5–3–0)
#	Date	Visitor	Score	Home	OT	Decision	Attendance	Record	Pts	Recap
29	December 3	Arizona	4–2	Columbus		Kuemper	14,455	16–9–4	36
30	December 5	Arizona	3–1	Philadelphia		Kuemper	17,440	17–9–4	38
31	December 6	Arizona	0–2	Pittsburgh		Raanta	18,432	17–10–4	38
32	December 8	Arizona	4–3	Chicago	SO	Kuemper	21,232	18–10–4	40
33	December 10	Calgary	5–2	Arizona		Raanta	11,198	18–11–4	40
34	December 12	Chicago	2–5	Arizona		Kuemper	13,150	19–11–4	42
35	December 14	New Jersey	2–1	Arizona		Kuemper	17,125	19–12–4	42
36	December 17	Arizona	3–2	San Jose		Kuemper	16,076	20–12–4	44
37	December 19	Minnesota	8–5	Arizona		Kuemper	15,582	20–13–4	44
38	December 22	Arizona	5–2	Detroit		Raanta	19,515	21–13–4	46
39	December 23	Arizona	2–3	Nashville		Raanta	17,697	21–14–4	46
40	December 28	Arizona	1–4	Vegas		Raanta	18,461	21–15–4	46
41	December 29	Dallas	4–2	Arizona		Raanta	17,125	21–16–4	46
42	December 31	St. Louis	1–3	Arizona		Raanta	14,618	22–16–4	48

January: 4–5–2 (Home: 3–0–2; Road: 1–5–0)
#	Date	Visitor	Score	Home	OT	Decision	Attendance	Record	Pts	Recap
43	January 2	Anaheim	2–4	Arizona		Raanta	14,651	23–16–4	50
44	January 4	Philadelphia	2–6	Arizona		Raanta	17,125	24–16–4	52
45	January 7	Arizona	5–2	Florida		Hill	12,120	25–16–4	54
46	January 9	Arizona	0–4	Tampa Bay		Hill	19,092	25–17–4	54
47	January 10	Arizona	0–3	Carolina		Raanta	16,476	25–18–4	54
48	January 12	Pittsburgh	4–3	Arizona	SO	Hill	13,755	25–18–5	55
49	January 14	San Jose	3–6	Arizona		Hill	14,716	26–18–5	57
50	January 16	Arizona	1–3	Vancouver		Hill	18,871	26–19–5	57
51	January 18	Arizona	3–7	Edmonton		Raanta	18,347	26–20–5	57
52	January 29	Arizona	2–4	Anaheim		Raanta	16,730	26–21–5	57
53	January 30	Los Angeles	3–2	Arizona	OT	Hill	13,346	26–21–6	58

February: 6–6–2 (Home: 5–2–1; Road: 1–4–1)
#	Date	Visitor	Score	Home	OT	Decision	Attendance	Record	Pts	Recap
54	February 1	Chicago	3–2	Arizona	SO	Raanta	17,125	26–21–7	59
55	February 4	Edmonton	0–3	Arizona		Raanta	14,725	27–21–7	61
56	February 6	Carolina	5–3	Arizona		Raanta	11,632	27–22–7	61
57	February 8	Arizona	2–4	Boston		Hill	17,850	27–23–7	61
58	February 10	Arizona	3–2	Montreal		Raanta	20,789	28–23–7	63
59	February 11	Arizona	2–3	Toronto	OT	Hill	19,039	28–23–8	64
60	February 13	Arizona	2–3	Ottawa		Raanta	9,762	28–24–8	64
61	February 15	Washington	1–3	Arizona		Raanta	17,139	29–24–8	66
62	February 17	NY Islanders	1–2	Arizona		Raanta	13,956	30–24–8	68
63	February 19	Arizona	2–3	Dallas		Hill	18,227	30–25–8	68
64	February 20	Arizona	0–1	St. Louis		Raanta	18,096	30–26–8	68
65	February 22	Tampa Bay	3–7	Arizona		Raanta	14,825	31–26–8	70
66	February 25	Florida	2–1	Arizona		Kuemper	12,391	31–27–8	70
67	February 29	Buffalo	2–5	Arizona		Raanta	17,125	32–27–8	72

March: 1–2–0 (Home: 0–0–0; Road: 1–2–0)
#	Date	Visitor	Score	Home	OT	Decision	Attendance	Record	Pts	Recap
68	March 4	Arizona	4–2	Vancouver		Kuemper	17,363	33–27–8	74
69	March 6	Arizona	2–3	Calgary		Kuemper	19,206	33–28–8	74
70	March 9	Arizona	2–4	Winnipeg		Kuemper	15,325	33–29–8	74

Cancelled games
#	Date	Visitor	Home
71	March 12	Vancouver	Arizona
72	March 14	NY Rangers	Arizona
73	March 16	Dallas	Arizona
74	March 18	Vegas	Arizona
75	March 20	Detroit	Arizona
76	March 22	Arizona	Los Angeles
77	March 25	Arizona	Vegas
78	March 28	Nashville	Arizona
79	March 29	Arizona	San Jose
80	March 31	Arizona	Colorado
81	April 2	Vancouver	Arizona
82	April 4	Winnipeg	Arizona

Legend: Win (2 points) Loss (0 points) Overtime/shootout loss (1 point)

=== Playoffs ===
The Coyotes defeated the Nashville Predators in four games in the qualifying round.

The Coyotes were defeated by the Colorado Avalanche in the first round in five games.

2020 Stanley Cup playoffs

Western Conference Qualifying Round vs. (6) Nashville Predators: Arizona won 3–1
#	Date	Visitor	Score	Home	OT	Decision	Series	Recap
1	August 2	Arizona	4–3	Nashville		Kuemper	1–0
2	August 4	Arizona	2–4	Nashville		Kuemper	1–1
3	August 5	Nashville	1–4	Arizona		Kuemper	2–1
4	August 7	Nashville	3–4	Arizona	OT	Kuemper	3–1

Western Conference First Round vs. (2) Colorado Avalanche: Colorado won 4–1
#	Date	Visitor	Score	Home	OT	Decision	Series	Recap
1	August 12	Arizona	0–3	Colorado		Kuemper	0–1
2	August 14	Arizona	2–3	Colorado		Kuemper	0–2
3	August 15	Colorado	2–4	Arizona		Kuemper	1–2
4	August 17	Colorado	7–1	Arizona		Kuemper	1–3
5	August 19	Arizona	1–7	Colorado		Kuemper	1–4

Legend: Win Loss

== Player statistics ==
=== Skaters ===
Regular season
Player	GP	G	A	Pts	+/−	PIM
Nick Schmaltz	70	11	34	45	3	20
Clayton Keller	70	17	27	44	−6	28
Conor Garland	68	22	17	39	1	20
Christian Dvorak	70	18	20	38	6	12
Phil Kessel	70	14	24	38	−21	22
Carl Soderberg	70	17	18	35	6	18
Alex Goligoski	70	4	28	32	8	24
Oliver Ekman-Larsson	66	9	21	30	−3	38
Derek Stepan	70	10	18	28	−4	16
Taylor Hall^{†}	35	10	17	27	−3	14
Jakob Chychrun	63	12	14	26	4	38
Lawson Crouse	66	15	10	25	0	33
Vinnie Hinostroza	68	5	17	22	1	14
Jordan Oesterle	58	3	10	13	−9	14
Michael Grabner	46	8	3	11	−4	6
Brad Richardson	59	6	5	11	1	20
Jason Demers	50	0	11	11	5	25
Christian Fischer	56	6	3	9	2	16
Niklas Hjalmarsson	27	1	4	5	−2	14
Barrett Hayton	20	1	3	4	2	14
Ilya Lyubushkin	51	0	4	4	4	18
Kyle Capobianco	9	1	0	1	−1	2
Aaron Ness	24	0	1	1	1	0
Jordan Gross	2	0	1	1	2	0
Michael Chaput	2	0	0	0	−2	2

Playoffs
Player	GP	G	A	Pts	+/−	PIM
Clayton Keller	9	4	3	7	1	0
Taylor Hall	9	2	4	6	−4	10
Derek Stepan	9	1	4	5	−4	6
Jordan Oesterle	9	1	3	4	1	0
Phil Kessel	9	1	3	4	−1	4
Oliver Ekman-Larsson	9	1	3	4	3	8
Jason Demers	9	0	4	4	5	8
Michael Grabner	9	3	0	3	−1	6
Brad Richardson	9	2	1	3	−1	4
Christian Dvorak	9	2	1	3	1	0
Lawson Crouse	9	2	0	2	1	2
Carl Soderberg	9	1	1	2	0	2
Conor Garland	8	1	1	2	1	0
Vinnie Hinostroza	7	0	2	2	1	2
Jakob Chychrun	9	1	0	1	−4	8
Christian Fischer	9	0	1	1	0	6
Niklas Hjalmarsson	9	0	1	1	−7	6
Alex Goligoski	9	0	0	0	−5	2
Barrett Hayton	3	0	0	0	−3	0

=== Goaltenders ===
Regular season
Player	GP	GS	TOI	W	L	OT	GA	GAA	SA	SV%	SO	G	A	PIM
Darcy Kuemper	29	29	1,753:24	16	11	2	65	2.22	903	.928	2	0	0	6
Antti Raanta	33	32	1,822:54	15	14	3	80	2.63	1,014	.921	2	0	0	2
Adin Hill	13	9	640:46	2	4	3	28	2.62	343	.918	0	0	0	2

Playoffs
Player	GP	GS	TOI	W	L	GA	GAA	SA	SV%	SO	G	A	PIM
Darcy Kuemper	9	9	501:59	4	5	29	3.47	334	.913	0	0	0	0
Antti Raanta	2	0	40:00	0	0	4	6.00	14	.714	0	0	0	0

^{†}Denotes player spent time with another team before joining the Coyotes. Stats reflect time with the Coyotes only.
^{‡}Denotes player was traded mid-season. Stats reflect time with the Coyotes only.
Bold/italics denotes franchise record.
