= 2019–20 NHL transactions =

The following is a list of all team-to-team transactions that have occurred in the National Hockey League (NHL) during the 2019–20 NHL season. It lists which team each player has been traded to, signed by, or claimed by, and for which player(s) or draft pick(s), if applicable. Players who have retired or released are also listed. The 2019–20 NHL trade deadline was on February 24, 2020. Players traded or claimed off waivers after this date were not eligible to play in the 2020 Stanley Cup playoffs.

== Retirement ==
Date	Player	Last Team	Ref
June 25, 2019	Brooks Orpik	Washington Capitals	
June 25, 2019	Matt Hendricks	Winnipeg Jets	
June 26, 2019	Roberto Luongo	Florida Panthers	
July 3, 2019	Chris Butler	St. Louis Blues	
July 10, 2019	Matt Cullen	Pittsburgh Penguins	
July 30, 2019	Chris Kunitz	Chicago Blackhawks	
July 31, 2019	Wade Megan	Detroit Red Wings	
August 1, 2019	Stephen Gionta	New York Islanders	
August 27, 2019	Mike McKenna	Philadelphia Flyers	
August 28, 2019	Cam Ward	Chicago Blackhawks	
August 29, 2019	Ben Lovejoy	Dallas Stars	
September 3, 2019	Niklas Kronwall	Detroit Red Wings	
September 11, 2019	Zachary Lauzon	Pittsburgh Penguins	
September 20, 2019	Dan Girardi	Tampa Bay Lightning	
September 22, 2019	Eric Gryba	New Jersey Devils	
October 1, 2019	Lee Stempniak	Boston Bruins	
October 1, 2019	Scott Eansor	New York Islanders	
October 7, 2019	Michael Leighton	Vancouver Canucks	
October 13, 2019	Chris Thorburn	St. Louis Blues	
October 23, 2019	Dennis Seidenberg	New York Islanders	
August 13, 2020	Dan Hamhuis	Nashville Predators	
August 26, 2020	Mike Green	Edmonton Oilers	
September 27, 2020	Chris Stewart	Philadelphia Flyers	
October 2, 2020	Richard Bachman	Vancouver Canucks	
October 5, 2020	Matt Niskanen	Philadelphia Flyers	

== Contract terminations ==
A team and player may mutually agree to terminate a player's contract at any time. All players must clear waivers before having a contract terminated.

Buyouts can only occur at specific times of the year. For more details on contract terminations as buyouts:

Teams may buy out player contracts (after the conclusion of a season) for a portion of the remaining value of the contract, paid over a period of twice the remaining length of the contract. This reduced number and extended period is applied to the cap hit as well.

- If the player was under the age of 26 at the time of the buyout the player's pay and cap hit will reduced by a factor of 2/3 over the extended period.
- If the player was 26 or older at the time of the buyout the player's pay and cap hit will reduced by a factor of 1/3 over the extended period.
- If the player was 35 or older at the time of signing the contract the player's pay will be reduced by a factor of 1/3, but the cap hit will not be reduced over the extended period.

Injured players cannot be bought out.

Date	Name	Previous team	Notes	Ref
June 25, 2019	Adam Musil	St. Louis Blues	Mutual termination	
June 27, 2019	Patrick Marleau	Carolina Hurricanes	Buyout	
June 28, 2019	Adam Helewka	New Jersey Devils	Mutual termination	
June 30, 2019	Valeri Nichushkin	Dallas Stars	Buyout	
June 30, 2019	Ryan Spooner	Vancouver Canucks	Buyout	
July 1, 2019	Scott Darling	Florida Panthers	Buyout	
July 1, 2019	David Schlemko	Philadelphia Flyers	Buyout	
July 1, 2019	Andrej Sekera	Edmonton Oilers	Buyout	
August 1, 2019	Kevin Shattenkirk	New York Rangers	Buyout	
August 2, 2019	Michael Stone	Calgary Flames	Buyout	
October 2, 2019	Gustav Bouramman	Florida Panthers	Mutual termination	
November 8, 2019	Alex Lintuniemi	Carolina Hurricanes	Mutual termination	
November 11, 2019	Erik Kallgren	Arizona Coyotes	Mutual termination	
November 20, 2019	Mario Kempe	Los Angeles Kings	Mutual termination	
December 7, 2019	David Sklenicka	Montreal Canadiens	Mutual termination	
December 12, 2019	Ville Meskanen	New York Rangers	Mutual termination	
December 14, 2019	Giovanni Fiore	Arizona Coyotes	Mutual termination	
December 15, 2019	Joe Morrow	New Jersey Devils	Mutual termination	
December 17, 2019	Ilya Kovalchuk	Los Angeles Kings	Mutual termination	
December 20, 2019	Sebastian Repo	Florida Panthers	Mutual termination	
January 6, 2020	Philip Holm	Chicago Blackhawks	Mutual termination	
January 25, 2020	Andreas Martinsen	Pittsburgh Penguins	Mutual termination	
February 22, 2020	Zach Bogosian	Buffalo Sabres	Termination	
April 17, 2020	Dustin Byfuglien	Winnipeg Jets	Mutual termination	
May 9, 2020	Brendan Leipsic	Washington Capitals	Termination	
May 28, 2020	Igor Shvyrev	Colorado Avalanche	Mutual termination	
May 29, 2020	Linus Olund	Pittsburgh Penguins	Mutual termination	
May 31, 2020	Sean Day	New York Rangers	Mutual termination	
June 10, 2020	Ondrej Vala	Dallas Stars	Mutual termination	
July 12, 2020	Andy Miele	Arizona Coyotes	Mutual termination	
July 16, 2020	Niclas Westerholm	Nashville Predators	Mutual termination	
August 16, 2020	Oleg Sosunov	Tampa Bay Lightning	Mutual termination	
September 26, 2020	Bobby Ryan	Ottawa Senators	Buyout	
September 30, 2020	Henrik Lundqvist	New York Rangers	Buyout	
October 4, 2020	Michael Grabner	Arizona Coyotes	Buyout	

== Free agency ==
Note: This does not include players who have re-signed with their previous team as an unrestricted free agent or as a restricted free agent.

Date	Player	New team	Previous team	Ref
July 1, 2019	Oscar Fantenberg	Vancouver Canucks	Calgary Flames	
July 1, 2019	Garnet Hathaway	Washington Capitals	Calgary Flames	
July 1, 2019	Corey Perry	Dallas Stars	Anaheim Ducks	
July 1, 2019	Brandon Tanev	Pittsburgh Penguins	Winnipeg Jets	
July 1, 2019	Keith Kinkaid	Montreal Canadiens	Columbus Blue Jackets	
July 1, 2019	Ron Hainsey	Ottawa Senators	Toronto Maple Leafs	
July 1, 2019	Mats Zuccarello	Minnesota Wild	Dallas Stars	
July 1, 2019	Jason Spezza	Toronto Maple Leafs	Dallas Stars	
July 1, 2019	Jordie Benn	Vancouver Canucks	Montreal Canadiens	
July 1, 2019	Mike Smith	Edmonton Oilers	Calgary Flames	
July 1, 2019	Ryan Hartman	Minnesota Wild	Dallas Stars	
July 1, 2019	Noel Acciari	Florida Panthers	Boston Bruins	
July 1, 2019	Cam Talbot	Calgary Flames	Philadelphia Flyers	
July 1, 2019	Artemi Panarin	New York Rangers	Columbus Blue Jackets	
July 1, 2019	Jean-Sebastien Dea	Buffalo Sabres	Florida Panthers	
July 1, 2019	Matt Duchene	Nashville Predators	Columbus Blue Jackets	
July 1, 2019	Ryan Carpenter	Chicago Blackhawks	Vegas Golden Knights	
July 1, 2019	Maxime Lagace	Boston Bruins	Vegas Golden Knights	
July 1, 2019	Joonas Donskoi	Colorado Avalanche	San Jose Sharks	
July 1, 2019	Richard Panik	Washington Capitals	Arizona Coyotes	
July 1, 2019	Andrew Hammond	Buffalo Sabres	Minnesota Wild	
July 1, 2019	Valtteri Filppula	Detroit Red Wings	New York Islanders	
July 1, 2019	Tyler Myers	Vancouver Canucks	Winnipeg Jets	
July 1, 2019	Curtis Lazar	Buffalo Sabres	Calgary Flames	
July 1, 2019	Patrik Nemeth	Detroit Red Wings	Colorado Avalanche	
July 1, 2019	Luke Johnson	Minnesota Wild	Chicago Blackhawks	
July 1, 2019	Brett Connolly	Florida Panthers	Washington Capitals	
July 1, 2019	Scott Wedgewood	Tampa Bay Lightning	Buffalo Sabres	
July 1, 2019	Gustav Nyquist	Columbus Blue Jackets	San Jose Sharks	
July 1, 2019	Brett Ritchie	Boston Bruins	Dallas Stars	
July 1, 2019	Curtis McElhinney	Tampa Bay Lightning	Carolina Hurricanes	
July 1, 2019	Tyler Graovac	Vancouver Canucks	Calgary Flames	
July 1, 2019	Gabriel Dumont	Minnesota Wild	Tampa Bay Lightning	
July 1, 2019	Sergei Bobrovsky	Florida Panthers	Columbus Blue Jackets	
July 1, 2019	John Gilmour	Buffalo Sabres	New York Rangers	
July 1, 2019	Andrej Sekera	Dallas Stars	Edmonton Oilers	
July 1, 2019	Nate Prosser	Philadelphia Flyers	Minnesota Wild	
July 1, 2019	Andy Andreoff	Philadelphia Flyers	Tampa Bay Lightning	
July 1, 2019	Kurtis Gabriel	Philadelphia Flyers	New Jersey Devils	
July 1, 2019	Patrick Brown	Vegas Golden Knights	Carolina Hurricanes	
July 1, 2019	Joe Pavelski	Dallas Stars	San Jose Sharks	
July 1, 2019	Riley Barber	Montreal Canadiens	Washington Capitals	
July 1, 2019	Jean-Francois Berube	Philadelphia Flyers	Columbus Blue Jackets	
July 1, 2019	Andy Welinski	Philadelphia Flyers	Anaheim Ducks	
July 1, 2019	Tyler Wotherspoon	Philadelphia Flyers	St. Louis Blues	
July 1, 2019	Pierre-Edouard Bellemare	Colorado Avalanche	Vegas Golden Knights	
July 1, 2019	Markus Granlund	Edmonton Oilers	Vancouver Canucks	
July 1, 2019	Jordan Szwarz	Ottawa Senators	Boston Bruins	
July 1, 2019	Kenny Agostino	Toronto Maple Leafs	New Jersey Devils	
July 1, 2019	Nathan Walker	St. Louis Blues	Washington Capitals	
July 1, 2019	Tyler Ennis	Ottawa Senators	Toronto Maple Leafs	
July 1, 2019	Wayne Simmonds	New Jersey Devils	Nashville Predators	
July 1, 2019	Kevin Gravel	Toronto Maple Leafs	Edmonton Oilers	
July 1, 2019	Anton Stralman	Florida Panthers	Tampa Bay Lightning	
July 1, 2019	Daniel Carr	Nashville Predators	Vegas Golden Knights	
July 1, 2019	Luke Schenn	Tampa Bay Lightning	Vancouver Canucks	
July 1, 2019	Chris Bigras	Philadelphia Flyers	New York Rangers	
July 1, 2019	Kyle Criscuolo	Philadelphia Flyers	Buffalo Sabres	
July 1, 2019	Calvin Pickard	Detroit Red Wings	Arizona Coyotes	
July 1, 2019	Greg McKegg	New York Rangers	Carolina Hurricanes	
July 1, 2019	Danny O'Regan	New York Rangers	Buffalo Sabres	
July 1, 2019	Aaron Ness	Arizona Coyotes	Washington Capitals	
July 1, 2019	David Warsofsky	Pittsburgh Penguins	Colorado Avalanche	
July 1, 2019	Andrew Agozzino	Pittsburgh Penguins	Colorado Avalanche	
July 1, 2019	Par Lindholm	Boston Bruins	Winnipeg Jets	
July 1, 2019	Brendan Gaunce	Boston Bruins	Vancouver Canucks	
July 1, 2019	Brendan Leipsic	Washington Capitals	Los Angeles Kings	
July 1, 2019	Zane McIntyre	Vancouver Canucks	Boston Bruins	
July 1, 2019	Tanner Kero	Dallas Stars	Vancouver Canucks	
July 1, 2019	Martin Frk	Los Angeles Kings	Detroit Red Wings	
July 1, 2019	Nick Lappin	St. Louis Blues	New Jersey Devils	
July 1, 2019	Mike Vecchione	St. Louis Blues	Philadelphia Flyers	
July 1, 2019	Derrick Pouliot	St. Louis Blues	Vancouver Canucks	
July 1, 2019	Luke Witkowski	Tampa Bay Lightning	Detroit Red Wings	
July 1, 2019	Joakim Ryan	Los Angeles Kings	San Jose Sharks	
July 1, 2019	Brandon Davidson	Calgary Flames	Chicago Blackhawks	
July 1, 2019	Byron Froese	Calgary Flames	Philadelphia Flyers	
July 1, 2019	Spencer Martin	Tampa Bay Lightning	Colorado Avalanche	
July 1, 2019	Chris Mueller	Tampa Bay Lightning	Toronto Maple Leafs	
July 1, 2019	Tyrell Goulbourne	Vegas Golden Knights	Philadelphia Flyers	
July 1, 2019	Brett Lernout	Vegas Golden Knights	Montreal Canadiens	
July 1, 2019	Jaycob Megna	Vegas Golden Knights	Anaheim Ducks	
July 1, 2019	Robin Lehner	Chicago Blackhawks	New York Islanders	
July 1, 2019	Semyon Varlamov	New York Islanders	Colorado Avalanche	
July 1, 2019	Dakota Mermis	New Jersey Devils	Arizona Coyotes	
July 1, 2019	Matt Tennyson	New Jersey Devils	Buffalo Sabres	
July 1, 2019	Ben Street	New Jersey Devils	Anaheim Ducks	
July 1, 2019	Tommy Cross	Florida Panthers	Columbus Blue Jackets	
July 1, 2019	Ethan Prow	Florida Panthers	Pittsburgh Penguins	
July 1, 2019	Jake Dotchin	St. Louis Blues	Anaheim Ducks	
July 1, 2019	Andrew Poturalski	Anaheim Ducks	Carolina Hurricanes	
July 2, 2019	Justin Kirkland	Calgary Flames	Nashville Predators	
July 2, 2019	Dalton Prout	San Jose Sharks	Calgary Flames	
July 2, 2019	Cole Bardreau	New York Islanders	Philadelphia Flyers	
July 2, 2019	Alex Lintuniemi	Carolina Hurricanes	Los Angeles Kings	
July 2, 2019	Jayson Megna	Colorado Avalanche	Washington Capitals	
July 2, 2019	Dan Renouf	Colorado Avalanche	Carolina Hurricanes	
July 2, 2019	T.J. Tynan	Colorado Avalanche	Vegas Golden Knights	
July 2, 2019	Anthony Bitetto	Winnipeg Jets	Minnesota Wild	
July 2, 2019	Jonny Brodzinski	San Jose Sharks	Los Angeles Kings	
July 2, 2019	Zach Gallant	San Jose Sharks	Detroit Red Wings	
July 2, 2019	Mark Letestu	Winnipeg Jets	Columbus Blue Jackets	
July 2, 2019	Blake Pietila	Anaheim Ducks	New Jersey Devils	
July 2, 2019	Anthony Stolarz	Anaheim Ducks	Edmonton Oilers	
July 2, 2019	Philippe Desrosiers	Florida Panthers	Dallas Stars	
July 3, 2019	Phil Varone	Montreal Canadiens	Philadelphia Flyers	
July 3, 2019	Jani Hakanpaa	Anaheim Ducks	St. Louis Blues	
July 4, 2019	Ben Chiarot	Montreal Canadiens	Winnipeg Jets	
July 4, 2019	Justin Bailey	Vancouver Canucks	Philadelphia Flyers	
July 4, 2019	Brian Gibbons	Carolina Hurricanes	Ottawa Senators	
July 4, 2019	Kevin Roy	Florida Panthers	Anaheim Ducks	
July 5, 2019	Nick Cousins	Montreal Canadiens	Arizona Coyotes	
July 5, 2019	Mario Kempe	Los Angeles Kings	Arizona Coyotes	
July 5, 2019	Andreas Martinsen	Anaheim Ducks	Chicago Blackhawks	
July 6, 2019	Marcus Johansson	Buffalo Sabres	Boston Bruins	
July 8, 2019	Gemel Smith	Tampa Bay Lightning	Boston Bruins	
July 8, 2019	Jake Massie	Florida Panthers	Chicago Blackhawks	
July 10, 2019	Jared Coreau	New York Islanders	St. Louis Blues	
July 10, 2019	Micheal Ferland	Vancouver Canucks	Carolina Hurricanes	
July 12, 2019	Ryan Dzingel	Carolina Hurricanes	Columbus Blue Jackets	
July 16, 2019	Josh Archibald	Edmonton Oilers	Arizona Coyotes	
July 16, 2019	Michael Del Zotto	Anaheim Ducks	St. Louis Blues	
July 16, 2019	Chris Wideman	Anaheim Ducks	Pittsburgh Penguins	
July 18, 2019	Phillip Di Giuseppe	New York Rangers	Nashville Predators	
July 23, 2019	Garrett Wilson	Toronto Maple Leafs	Pittsburgh Penguins	
July 24, 2019	Pontus Aberg	Toronto Maple Leafs	Minnesota Wild	
July 24, 2019	Tyler Gaudet	Toronto Maple Leafs	Nashville Predators	
July 24, 2019	Kalle Kossila	Toronto Maple Leafs	Anaheim Ducks	
July 25, 2019	Max McCormick	Carolina Hurricanes	Colorado Avalanche	
August 5, 2019	Kevin Shattenkirk	Tampa Bay Lightning	New York Rangers	
August 8, 2019	Marko Dano	Columbus Blue Jackets	Winnipeg Jets	
August 13, 2019	Philip Holm	Chicago Blackhawks	Vegas Golden Knights	
August 17, 2019	Chase Priskie	Carolina Hurricanes	Washington Capitals	
August 19, 2019	Valeri Nichushkin	Colorado Avalanche	Dallas Stars	
August 21, 2019	Derick Brassard	New York Islanders	Colorado Avalanche	
August 24, 2019	Patrick Maroon	Tampa Bay Lightning	St. Louis Blues	
August 26, 2019	Gabriel Bourque	Winnipeg Jets	Colorado Avalanche	
September 5, 2019	Riley Sheahan	Edmonton Oilers	Florida Panthers	
September 6, 2019	Jake Gardiner	Carolina Hurricanes	Toronto Maple Leafs	
September 17, 2019	Fredrik Claesson	Carolina Hurricanes	New York Rangers	
September 18, 2019	Ben Hutton	Los Angeles Kings	Vancouver Canucks	
September 26, 2019	Alex Petrovic	Boston Bruins	Edmonton Oilers	
September 27, 2019	Tobias Rieder	Calgary Flames	Edmonton Oilers	
September 29, 2019	Zac Rinaldo	Calgary Flames	Nashville Predators	
October 1, 2019	Micheal Haley	New York Rangers	San Jose Sharks	
October 6, 2019	Joe Morrow	New Jersey Devils	Winnipeg Jets	
October 8, 2019	Patrick Marleau	San Jose Sharks	Carolina Hurricanes	
October 20, 2019	Brian Boyle	Florida Panthers	Nashville Predators	
October 22, 2019	Luca Sbisa	Anaheim Ducks	New York Islanders	
November 20, 2019	Troy Brouwer	St. Louis Blues	Florida Panthers	
January 3, 2020	Ilya Kovalchuk	Montreal Canadiens	Los Angeles Kings	
February 23, 2020	Zach Bogosian	Tampa Bay Lightning	Buffalo Sabres	
March 19, 2020	Ryan McGregor	Arizona Coyotes	Toronto Maple Leafs	
July 16, 2020	Wyatt Kalynuk	Chicago Blackhawks	Philadelphia Flyers	
July 17, 2020	Sean Day	Tampa Bay Lightning	New York Rangers	
August 16, 2020	Matt Filipe	Boston Bruins	Carolina Hurricanes	
August 18, 2020	Cam Morrison	Chicago Blackhawks	Colorado Avalanche	
August 19, 2020	Ryan Shea	Dallas Stars	Chicago Blackhawks	

=== Offer sheets ===
An offer sheet is a contract offered to a restricted free agent by a team other than the one for which his rights are owned by. If the player signs the offer sheet, his current team has seven days to match the contract offer and keep the player or else he goes to the team that gave the offer sheet, with compensation going to his first team.

Date Offered	Player	Original Team	Offer Team	Contract Offered	Date Resolved	Result	Compensation	Ref
July 1, 2019	Sebastian Aho	Carolina Hurricanes	Montreal Canadiens	5 years $8,454,000	July 7, 2019	matched	none	

=== Imports ===
This section is for players who were not previously on contract with NHL teams in the past season. Listed is the last team and league they were under contract with.

Date	Player	New team	Previous team	League	Ref
July 1, 2019	Nick Ebert	Ottawa Senators	Orebro HK	SHL	
July 1, 2019	Joona Luoto	Winnipeg Jets	Tappara	Liiga	
July 1, 2019	Jakob Lilja	Columbus Blue Jackets	Djurgardens IF	SHL	
July 1, 2019	Tomas Jurco	Edmonton Oilers	Charlotte Checkers	AHL	
July 1, 2019	Philippe Maillet	Washington Capitals	Ontario Reign	AHL	
July 1, 2019	Nick Shore	Toronto Maple Leafs	Metallurg Magnitogorsk	KHL	
July 1, 2019	Andy Miele	Arizona Coyotes	Torpedo Nizhny Novgorod	KHL	
July 1, 2019	Beau Bennett	Arizona Coyotes	HC Dinamo Minsk	KHL	
July 1, 2019	Evan Polei	St. Louis Blues	Bakersfield Condors	AHL	
July 1, 2019	Gaetan Haas	Edmonton Oilers	SC Bern	NL	
July 2, 2019	Nikolai Knyzhov	San Jose Sharks	SKA-Neva	VHL	
July 2, 2019	Joel Lowry	Florida Panthers	Springfield Thunderbirds	AHL	
September 20, 2019	Brayden Pachal	Vegas Golden Knights	Prince Albert Raiders	WHL	
September 27, 2019	Scott Sabourin	Ottawa Senators	Stockton Heat	AHL	
October 15, 2019	Chris Stewart	Philadelphia Flyers	Nottingham Panthers	EIHL	
December 2, 2019	Stefan Noesen	Pittsburgh Penguins	Wilkes-Barre/Scranton Penguins	AHL	
December 30, 2019	Dalton Smith	Buffalo Sabres	Rochester Americans	AHL	
January 23, 2020	Matt Tomkins	Chicago Blackhawks	Rockford IceHogs	AHL	
February 10, 2020	Hunter Miska	Colorado Avalanche	Colorado Eagles	AHL	
February 17, 2020	Taylor Leier	Buffalo Sabres	Rochester Americans	AHL	
February 19, 2020	Stefan Matteau	Columbus Blue Jackets	Cleveland Monsters	AHL	
February 22, 2020	Kevin Poulin	Los Angeles Kings	Eisbaren Berlin	DEL	
February 23, 2020	Hubert Labrie	Ottawa Senators	Belleville Senators	AHL	
February 23, 2020	Julian Melchiori	New Jersey Devils	Binghamton Devils	AHL	
March 3, 2020	Bryce Kindopp	Anaheim Ducks	Everett Silvertips	WHL	
March 4, 2020	Jake Christiansen	Columbus Blue Jackets	Everett Silvertips	WHL	
March 9, 2020	Drew O'Connor	Pittsburgh Penguins	Dartmouth Big Green	NCAA	
March 9, 2020	Jerad Rosburg	Dallas Stars	Michigan State Spartans	NCAA	
March 9, 2020	Patrick Khodorenko	New York Rangers	Michigan State Spartans	NCAA	
March 17, 2020	Cam Lee	Pittsburgh Penguins	Western Michigan Broncos	NCAA	
March 18, 2020	Brandon Biro	Buffalo Sabres	Penn State Nittany Lions	NCAA	
March 18, 2020	Nick Wolff	Boston Bruins	Minnesota–Duluth Bulldogs	NCAA	
March 19, 2020	Cole Smith	Nashville Predators	North Dakota Fighting Hawks	NCAA	
March 19, 2020	Marc Michaelis	Vancouver Canucks	Minnesota State Mavericks	NCAA	
March 20, 2020	Nate Sucese	Arizona Coyotes	Penn State Nittany Lions	NCAA	
March 20, 2020	Austin Rueschhoff	New York Rangers	Western Michigan Broncos	NCAA	
March 20, 2020	Connor Mackey	Calgary Flames	Minnesota State Mavericks	NCAA	
March 20, 2020	Colton Poolman	Calgary Flames	North Dakota Fighting Hawks	NCAA	
March 23, 2020	Dawson DiPietro	Buffalo Sabres	Western Michigan Broncos	NCAA	
March 24, 2020	Jason Cotton	Carolina Hurricanes	Sacred Heart Pioneers	NCAA	
March 24, 2020	Mitchell Chaffee	Minnesota Wild	UMass Minutemen	NCAA	
March 25, 2020	Tommy Novak	Nashville Predators	Milwaukee Admirals	AHL	
March 26, 2020	Alec Rauhauser	Florida Panthers	Bowling Green Falcons	NCAA	
March 26, 2020	Jack Ahcan	Boston Bruins	St. Cloud State Huskies	NCAA	
March 31, 2020	Brinson Pasichnuk	San Jose Sharks	Arizona State Sun Devils	NCAA	
April 1, 2020	Kristians Rubins	Toronto Maple Leafs	Toronto Marlies	AHL	
April 2, 2020	Justin Richards	New York Rangers	Minnesota–Duluth Bulldogs	NCAA	
April 7, 2020	Alexander Barabanov	Toronto Maple Leafs	SKA Saint Petersburg	KHL	
April 11, 2020	Jonathan Aspirot	Ottawa Senators	Belleville Senators	AHL	
April 21, 2020	Vasili Demchenko	Montreal Canadiens	Metallurg Magnitogorsk	KHL	
April 29, 2020	Mathias Brome	Detroit Red Wings	Orebro HK	SHL	
April 29, 2020	Radim Zohorna	Pittsburgh Penguins	BK Mlada Boleslav	ELH	
April 29, 2020	Johannes Kinnvall	Calgary Flames	HV71	SHL	
April 29, 2020	Theodor Lennstrom	Edmonton Oilers	Frolunda HC	SHL	
April 29, 2020	Linus Sandin	Philadelphia Flyers	HV71	SHL	
May 1, 2020	Artyom Zub	Ottawa Senators	SKA Saint Petersburg	KHL	
May 4, 2020	Mikko Lehtonen	Toronto Maple Leafs	Jokerit	KHL	
May 4, 2020	Fredrik Handemark	San Jose Sharks	Malmo Redhawks	SHL	
May 4, 2020	Alexei Melnichuk	San Jose Sharks	SKA Saint Petersburg	KHL	
May 29, 2020	Matej Chalupa	Chicago Blackhawks	Mountfield HK	ELH	
June 1, 2020	Kodie Curran	Anaheim Ducks	Rogle BK	SHL	
June 15, 2020	Kristian Reichel	Winnipeg Jets	Manitoba Moose	AHL	
July 13, 2020	Logan Thompson	Vegas Golden Knights	Hershey Bears	AHL	
July 14, 2020	Mikhail Grigorenko	Columbus Blue Jackets	HC CSKA Moscow	KHL	
July 15, 2020	Sean Malone	Nashville Predators	Rochester Americans	AHL	
July 16, 2020	Pius Suter	Chicago Blackhawks	ZSC Lions	NLA	
August 5, 2020	Henry Bowlby	Florida Panthers	Harvard Crimson	NCAA	
August 6, 2020	Robert Lantosi	Boston Bruins	Providence Bruins	AHL	
August 19, 2020	Zach Fucale	Washington Capitals	EHC Red Bull Munchen	DEL	
August 21, 2020	Josh Maniscalco	Pittsburgh Penguins	Arizona State Sun Devils	NCAA	
September 10, 2020	Adam Cracknell	Edmonton Oilers	HC Kunlun Red Star	KHL	
September 29, 2020	Devin Cooley	Nashville Predators	Denver Pioneers	NCAA	

== Trades ==
* Retained Salary Transaction: Each team is allowed up to three contracts on their payroll where they have retained salary in a trade (i.e. the player no longer plays with Team A due to a trade to Team B, but Team A still retains some salary). Only up to 50% of a player's contract can be kept, and only up to 15% of a team's salary cap can be taken up by retained salary. A contract can only be involved in one of these trades twice.

Trade was restructured due to complications of play due to the COVID-19 pandemic.

Hover over retained salary or conditional transactions for more information.

=== June ===
June 22, 2019	To Carolina Hurricanes Patrick Marleau conditional 1st-round pick in 2020 or 1st-round pick in 2021; 7th-round pick in 2020	To Toronto Maple Leafs 6th-round pick in 2020
June 22, 2019	To New Jersey Devils P.K. Subban	To Nashville Predators Steven Santini; Jeremy Davies; 2nd-round pick in 2019; 2nd-round pick in 2020
June 22, 2019	To Vancouver Canucks J.T. Miller	To Tampa Bay Lightning Marek Mazanec; 3rd-round pick in 2019 conditional 1st-round pick in 2020 or 1st-round pick in 2021
June 22, 2019	To New Jersey Devils John Hayden	To Chicago Blackhawks John Quenneville
June 22, 2019	To San Jose Sharks Tom Pyatt; 6th-round pick in 2019	To Vancouver Canucks Francis Perron; 7th-round pick in 2019
June 23, 2019	To New Jersey Devils Adam Helewka	To Nashville Predators future considerations
June 24, 2019	To Dallas Stars Ryan Hartman	To Philadelphia Flyers Tyler Pitlick
June 24, 2019	To Chicago Blackhawks Calvin de Haan; Aleksi Saarela	To Carolina Hurricanes Gustav Forsling; Anton Forsberg
June 25, 2019	To Arizona Coyotes Carl Soderberg	To Colorado Avalanche Kevin Connauton; 3rd-round pick in 2020
June 26, 2019	To Carolina Hurricanes Erik Haula	To Vegas Golden Knights Nicolas Roy conditional 5th-round pick in 2021
June 28, 2019	To Colorado Avalanche Andre Burakovsky	To Washington Capitals Scott Kosmachuk; 2nd-round pick in 2020; ARI 3rd-round pick in 2020
June 28, 2019	To Buffalo Sabres Colin Miller	To Vegas Golden Knights STL 2nd-round pick in 2021; 5th-round pick in 2022
June 29, 2019	To Florida Panthers Dominic Toninato	To Colorado Avalanche Jacob MacDonald
June 29, 2019	To Arizona Coyotes Phil Kessel; Dane Birks; 4th-round pick in 2021	To Pittsburgh Penguins Alex Galchenyuk; Pierre-Olivier Joseph
June 30, 2019	To Carolina Hurricanes James Reimer	To Florida Panthers Scott Darling; BUF 6th-round pick in 2020
June 30, 2019	To Chicago Blackhawks Andrew Shaw; 7th-round pick in 2021	To Montreal Canadiens 2nd-round pick in 2020; 7th-round pick in 2020; 3rd-round pick in 2021
June 30, 2019	To Anaheim Ducks Nicolas Deslauriers	To Montreal Canadiens 4th-round pick in 2020

Pick-only 2019 NHL entry draft trades
June 21, 2019	To Arizona Coyotes 1st-round pick in 2019 (#11 overall)	To Philadelphia Flyers 1st-round pick in 2019 (#14 overall); 2nd-round pick in 2019 (#45 overall)
June 22, 2019	To Philadelphia Flyers NJD 2nd-round pick in 2019 (#34 overall)	To Nashville Predators ARI 2nd-round pick in 2019 (#45 overall); NJD 3rd-round pick in 2019 (#65 overall)
June 22, 2019	To Ottawa Senators NYR 2nd-round pick in 2019 (#37 overall)	To Carolina Hurricanes FLA 2nd-round pick in 2019 (#44 overall); PIT 3rd-round pick in 2019 (#83 overall)
June 22, 2019	To Vegas Golden Knights PHI 2nd-round pick in 2019 (#41 overall)	To San Jose Sharks 2nd-round pick in 2019 (#48 overall); WPG 3rd-round pick in 2019 (#82 overall)
June 22, 2019	To Los Angeles Kings CBJ 2nd-round pick in 2019 (#50 overall)	To Montreal Canadiens 3rd-round pick in 2019 (#64 overall); 5th-round pick in 2019 (#126 overall)
June 22, 2019	To San Jose Sharks NSH 2nd-round pick in 2019 (#55 overall)	To New Jersey Devils WPG 3rd-round pick in 2019 (#82 overall); 3rd-round pick in 2019 (#91 overall)
June 22, 2019	To Minnesota Wild 2nd-round pick in 2019 (#59 overall)	To Carolina Hurricanes 3rd-round pick in 2019 (#73 overall); NYR 4th-round pick in 2019 (#99 overall)
June 22, 2019	To Pittsburgh Penguins CHI 3rd-round pick in 2019 (#74 overall)	To Arizona Coyotes BUF 4th-round pick in 2019 (#98 overall); TBL 5th-round pick in 2019 (#151 overall); 7th-round pick in 2019 (#207 overall)
June 22, 2019	To Minnesota Wild FLA 3rd-round pick in 2019 (#75 overall)	To Nashville Predators 3rd-round pick in 2020
June 22, 2019	To Florida Panthers 3rd-round pick in 2019 (#81 overall)	To Columbus Blue Jackets MIN 4th-round pick in 2019 (#104 overall); PIT 4th-round pick in 2019 (#114 overall)
June 22, 2019	To Washington Capitals SJS 3rd-round pick in 2019 (#91 overall)	To New Jersey Devils 4th-round pick in 2019 (#118 overall); BUF 5th-round pick in 2019 (#129 overall)
June 22, 2019	To Buffalo Sabres 4th-round pick in 2019 (#102 overall)	To Vancouver Canucks SJS 4th-round pick in 2019 (#122 overall); WPG 6th-round pick in 2019 (#175 overall)
June 22, 2019	To San Jose Sharks 4th-round pick in 2019 (#108 overall)	To Montreal Canadiens 4th-round pick in 2020
June 22, 2019	To Florida Panthers CHI 5th-round pick in 2019 (#136 overall)	To Montreal Canadiens 5th-round pick in 2020
June 22, 2019	To Buffalo Sabres CBJ 5th-round pick in 2019 (#143 overall)	To Detroit Red Wings TOR 6th-round pick in 2019 (#177 overall); 7th-round pick in 2019 (#191 overall)
June 22, 2019	To Washington Capitals 5th-round pick in 2019 (#153 overall)	To San Jose Sharks 7th-round pick in 2019 (#211 overall); 7th-round pick in 2020
June 22, 2019	To Montreal Canadiens MTL 7th-round pick in 2019 (#201 overall)	To Philadelphia Flyers 7th-round pick in 2020
June 22, 2019	To St. Louis Blues 7th-round pick in 2019 (#208 overall)	To Toronto Maple Leafs 7th-round pick in 2020
June 22, 2019	To Pittsburgh Penguins WSH 7th-round pick in 2019 (#211 overall)	To San Jose Sharks 7th-round pick in 2020

=== July ===
July 1, 2019	To Toronto Maple Leafs Cody Ceci; Ben Harpur; Aaron Luchuk; CBJ 3rd-round pick in 2020	To Ottawa Senators Nikita Zaitsev; Connor Brown; Michael Carcone
July 1, 2019	To Buffalo Sabres Jimmy Vesey	To New York Rangers 3rd-round pick in 2021
July 1, 2019	To Colorado Avalanche Nazem Kadri; Calle Rosen; 3rd-round pick in 2020	To Toronto Maple Leafs Tyson Barrie*; Alexander Kerfoot; 6th-round pick in 2020
July 9, 2019	To Chicago Blackhawks Alexander Nylander	To Buffalo Sabres Henri Jokiharju
July 12, 2019	To St. Louis Blues Dakota Joshua	To Toronto Maple Leafs future considerations
July 16, 2019	To Ottawa Senators Artem Anisimov	To Chicago Blackhawks Zack Smith
July 19, 2019	To Calgary Flames Milan Lucic* conditional 3rd-round pick in 2020	To Edmonton Oilers James Neal
July 19, 2019	Trade restructured due to suspension of 2019–20 NHL season	
July 19, 2019	To Calgary Flames Milan Lucic* conditional 3rd-round pick in 2020 or 3rd-round pick in 2021	To Edmonton Oilers James Neal
July 23, 2019	To Vegas Golden Knights Garret Sparks	To Toronto Maple Leafs David Clarkson; 4th-round pick in 2020
July 25, 2019	To Toronto Maple Leafs Jordan Schmaltz	To St. Louis Blues Andreas Borgman
July 26, 2019	To Pittsburgh Penguins John Marino	To Edmonton Oilers conditional 6th-round pick in 2021
July 29, 2019	To New Jersey Devils Nikita Gusev	To Vegas Golden Knights 3rd-round pick in 2020; 2nd-round pick in 2021
July 30, 2019	To Tampa Bay Lightning Mike Condon; 6th round pick in 2020	To Ottawa Senators Ryan Callahan; 5th round pick in 2020

=== August ===
August 6, 2019	To San Jose Sharks Trevor Carrick	To Carolina Hurricanes Kyle Wood
August 14, 2019	To Detroit Red Wings Adam Erne	To Tampa Bay Lightning 4th-round pick in 2020
August 23, 2019	To Florida Panthers Gustav Bouramman	To Minnesota Wild future considerations

=== September ===
September 24, 2019	To St. Louis Blues Justin Faulk*; 5th-round pick in 2020	To Carolina Hurricanes Joel Edmundson; Dominik Bokk; 7th-round pick in 2021
September 27, 2019	To Colorado Avalanche Antoine Bibeau	To San Jose Sharks Nicolas Meloche

=== October ===
October 6, 2019	To Detroit Red Wings Alex Biega	To Vancouver Canucks David Pope
October 7, 2019	To Ottawa Senators Vladislav Namestnikov*	To New York Rangers Nick Ebert; 4th-round pick in 2021
October 22, 2019	To Florida Panthers Aleksi Saarela	To Chicago Blackhawks Ian McCoshen
October 25, 2019	To Anaheim Ducks Erik Gudbranson	To Pittsburgh Penguins Andreas Martinsen; 7th-round pick in 2021
October 26, 2019	To Florida Panthers Jack Rodewald	To Ottawa Senators Chris Wilkie
October 28, 2019	To Detroit Red Wings Brendan Perlini	To Chicago Blackhawks Alec Regula

=== November ===
November 1, 2019	To New Jersey Devils Louis Domingue	To Tampa Bay Lightning conditional 7th-round pick in 2021
November 6, 2019	To Detroit Red Wings Robby Fabbri	To St. Louis Blues Jacob de la Rose
November 20, 2019	To Chicago Blackhawks Joseph Cramarossa	To Pittsburgh Penguins Graham Knott
November 24, 2019	To Buffalo Sabres Matthew Spencer	To Tampa Bay Lightning Devante Stephens
November 30, 2019	To Detroit Red Wings Eric Comrie	To Arizona Coyotes Vili Saarijarvi

=== December ===
December 2, 2019	To Vegas Golden Knights Chandler Stephenson	To Washington Capitals 5th-round pick in 2021
December 12, 2019	To Carolina Hurricanes Oliwer Kaski	To Detroit Red Wings Kyle Wood
December 16, 2019	To Arizona Coyotes Taylor Hall*; Blake Speers	To New Jersey Devils Nick Merkley; Nate Schnarr; Kevin Bahl conditional 1st-round pick in 2020 or 1st-round pick in 2021 conditional 1st-round pick in 2021 or 2nd-round pick in 2021 or 3rd-round pick in 2021
December 17, 2019	To Pittsburgh Penguins Kevin Roy	To Florida Panthers Ryan Haggerty
December 30, 2019	To Anaheim Ducks Chris Mueller	To Tampa Bay Lightning Patrick Sieloff

=== January ===
January 2, 2020	To Ottawa Senators Mike Reilly	To Montreal Canadiens Andrew Sturtz; 5th-round pick in 2021
January 2, 2020	To Montreal Canadiens Marco Scandella	To Buffalo Sabres SJS 4th-round pick in 2020
January 2, 2020	To Buffalo Sabres Michael Frolik	To Calgary Flames SJS 4th-round pick in 2020
January 7, 2020	To Nashville Predators Michael McCarron	To Montreal Canadiens Laurent Dauphin
January 17, 2020	To Dallas Stars Oula Palve	To Pittsburgh Penguins John Nyberg

=== February ===
February 5, 2020	To Toronto Maple Leafs Jack Campbell; Kyle Clifford*	To Los Angeles Kings Trevor Moore; CBJ 3rd-round pick in 2020 conditional 2nd-round pick in 2021 or 3rd-round pick in 2021
February 5, 2020	Trade restructured due to suspension of 2019–20 NHL season	
February 5, 2020	To Toronto Maple Leafs Jack Campbell; Kyle Clifford*	To Los Angeles Kings Trevor Moore; CBJ 3rd-round pick in 2020 conditional 2nd-round pick in 2021 or 3rd-round pick in 2021
February 10, 2020	To Pittsburgh Penguins Jason Zucker	To Minnesota Wild Alex Galchenyuk; Calen Addison conditional 1st-round pick in 2020 or 1st-round pick in 2021
February 16, 2020	To New York Islanders Andy Greene	To New Jersey Devils David Quenneville; 2nd-round pick in 2021
February 16, 2020	To Tampa Bay Lightning Blake Coleman	To New Jersey Devils Nolan Foote conditional VAN 1st-round pick in 2020 or VAN 1st-round pick in 2021
February 17, 2020	To Vancouver Canucks Tyler Toffoli	To Los Angeles Kings Tim Schaller; Tyler Madden; 2nd-round pick in 2020 conditional 4th-round pick in 2022
February 18, 2020	To New York Rangers Julien Gauthier	To Carolina Hurricanes Joey Keane
February 18, 2020	To Winnipeg Jets Dylan DeMelo	To Ottawa Senators 3rd-round pick in 2020
February 18, 2020	To Washington Capitals Brenden Dillon*	To San Jose Sharks COL 2nd-round pick in 2020 conditional ARI 3rd-round pick in 2020 or WSH 3rd-round pick in 2021
February 18, 2020	To St. Louis Blues Marco Scandella*	To Montreal Canadiens 2nd-round pick in 2020 conditional 4th-round pick in 2021
February 19, 2020	To Toronto Maple Leafs Denis Malgin	To Florida Panthers Mason Marchment
February 19, 2020	To Vegas Golden Knights Alec Martinez	To Los Angeles Kings 2nd-round pick in 2020; STL 2nd-round pick in 2021
February 19, 2020	To Toronto Maple Leafs Max Veronneau	To Ottawa Senators Aaron Luchuk conditional 6th-round pick in 2021
February 19, 2020	To New York Rangers Jean-Francois Berube	To Philadelphia Flyers future considerations
February 20, 2020	To Montreal Canadiens Joseph Blandisi; Jake Lucchini	To Pittsburgh Penguins Phil Varone; Riley Barber
February 20, 2020	To Florida Panthers Danick Martel	To Tampa Bay Lightning Anthony Greco
February 21, 2020	To Boston Bruins Ondrej Kase	To Anaheim Ducks David Backes*; Axel Andersson; 1st-round pick in 2020
February 21, 2020	To Winnipeg Jets Cody Eakin	To Vegas Golden Knights conditional 3rd-round pick in 2021 or 4th-round pick in 2021
February 22, 2020	To Toronto Maple Leafs Miikka Salomaki	To Nashville Predators Ben Harpur
February 23, 2020	To Washington Capitals Ilya Kovalchuk*	To Montreal Canadiens 3rd-round pick in 2020
February 24, 2020	To Edmonton Oilers Mike Green*	To Detroit Red Wings Kyle Brodziak conditional 3rd-round pick in 2021 or 4th-round pick in 2020
February 24, 2020	To Colorado Avalanche Vladislav Namestnikov	To Ottawa Senators 4th-round pick in 2021
February 24, 2020	To New York Islanders Jean-Gabriel Pageau	To Ottawa Senators conditional 1st-round pick in 2020 or 1st-round pick in 2021; 2nd-round pick in 2020 conditional 3rd-round pick in 2022
February 24, 2020	To Carolina Hurricanes Vincent Trocheck	To Florida Panthers Erik Haula; Lucas Wallmark; Chase Priskie; Eetu Luostarinen
February 24, 2020	To Philadelphia Flyers Nate Thompson	To Montreal Canadiens 5th-round pick in 2021
February 24, 2020	To Pittsburgh Penguins Patrick Marleau	To San Jose Sharks conditional 2nd-round pick in 2021 or 3rd-round pick in 2021
February 24, 2020	To Toronto Maple Leafs Calle Rosen	To Colorado Avalanche Michael Hutchinson
February 24, 2020	To Philadelphia Flyers Derek Grant	To Anaheim Ducks Kyle Criscuolo conditional NSH 4th-round pick in 2020 or PHI 4th-round pick in 2020
February 24, 2020	To Buffalo Sabres Wayne Simmonds*	To New Jersey Devils conditional 4th-round pick in 2021 or 5th-round pick in 2021
February 24, 2020	To Anaheim Ducks Danton Heinen	To Boston Bruins Nick Ritchie
February 24, 2020	To Ottawa Senators Matthew Peca	To Montreal Canadiens Aaron Luchuk; 7th-round pick in 2020
February 24, 2020	To Edmonton Oilers Andreas Athanasiou; Ryan Kuffner	To Detroit Red Wings Sam Gagner*; 2nd-round pick in 2020; 2nd-round pick in 2021
February 24, 2020	To Edmonton Oilers Tyler Ennis	To Ottawa Senators 5th-round pick in 2021
February 24, 2020	To Calgary Flames Derek Forbort*	To Los Angeles Kings conditional 3rd-round pick in 2022 or 4th-round pick in 2021
February 24, 2020	To Buffalo Sabres Dominik Kahun	To Pittsburgh Penguins Conor Sheary; Evan Rodrigues
February 24, 2020	To Florida Panthers Emil Djuse	To Dallas Stars BUF 6th-round pick in 2020
February 24, 2020	To Anaheim Ducks Sonny Milano	To Columbus Blue Jackets Devin Shore
February 24, 2020	To Carolina Hurricanes Brady Skjei	To New York Rangers conditional CAR 1st-round pick in 2020 or TOR 1st-round pick in 2020
February 24, 2020	To Tampa Bay Lightning Barclay Goodrow; PHI 3rd-round pick in 2020	To San Jose Sharks Anthony Greco; 1st-round pick in 2020
February 24, 2020	To Vancouver Canucks Louis Domingue	To New Jersey Devils Zane McIntyre
February 24, 2020	To Nashville Predators Korbinian Holzer	To Anaheim Ducks Matt Irwin; 6th-round pick in 2022
February 24, 2020	To Calgary Flames Erik Gustafsson	To Chicago Blackhawks conditional CGY 3rd-round pick in 2020 or EDM 3rd-round pick in 2020
February 24, 2020	To Carolina Hurricanes Sami Vatanen*	To New Jersey Devils Fredrik Claesson; Janne Kuokkanen conditional 3rd-round pick in 2020 or 4th-round pick in 2020
February 24, 2020	Trade restructured due to suspension of 2019–20 NHL season	
February 24, 2020	To Carolina Hurricanes Sami Vatanen*	To New Jersey Devils Fredrik Claesson; Janne Kuokkanen conditional 3rd-round pick in 2020 or 4th-round pick in 2020 or 4th-round pick in 2021
February 24, 2020	To Washington Capitals Daniel Sprong	To Anaheim Ducks Christian Djoos
February 24, 2020	To Vegas Golden Knights Nick Cousins	To Montreal Canadiens 4th-round pick in 2021
February 24, 2020	To Arizona Coyotes Markus Hannikainen	To Columbus Blue Jackets conditional 7th-round pick in 2020
February 24, 2020	To Chicago Blackhawks T.J. Brennan	To Philadelphia Flyers Nathan Noel
February 24, 2020	To San Jose Sharks Brandon Davidson	To Calgary Flames future considerations
February 24, 2020	To New York Islanders Jordan Schmaltz	To Toronto Maple Leafs Matt Lorito
February 24, 2020	To Anaheim Ducks Joel Persson	To Edmonton Oilers Angus Redmond conditional 7th-round pick in 2022
February 24, 2020	Trade restructured due to shortened 2020–21 NHL season	
February 24, 2020	To Anaheim Ducks Joel Persson	To Edmonton Oilers Angus Redmond conditional 7th-round pick in 2022
February 24, 2020	To Toronto Maple Leafs Robin Lehner*	To Chicago Blackhawks Martins Dzierkals
February 24, 2020	To Vegas Golden Knights Robin Lehner*	To Toronto Maple Leafs 5th-round pick in 2020
February 24, 2020	To Chicago Blackhawks Malcolm Subban; Slava Demin; PIT 2nd-round pick in 2020	To Vegas Golden Knights Martins Dzierkals

=== August (2020) ===
August 25, 2020	To Pittsburgh Penguins Kasperi Kapanen; Pontus Aberg; Jesper Lindgren	To Toronto Maple Leafs Evan Rodrigues; David Warsofsky; Filip Hallander; 1st-round pick in 2020

=== September (2020) ===
September 2, 2020	To Montreal Canadiens Jake Allen; 7th-round pick in 2022	To St. Louis Blues WSH 3rd-round pick in 2020; CHI 7th-round pick in 2020
September 11, 2020	To Minnesota Wild Nick Bjugstad*	To Pittsburgh Penguins conditional 7th-round pick in 2021
September 12, 2020	To Montreal Canadiens Joel Edmundson	To Carolina Hurricanes 5th-round pick in 2020
September 16, 2020	To Buffalo Sabres Eric Staal	To Minnesota Wild Marcus Johansson
September 24, 2020	To Florida Panthers Patric Hornqvist	To Pittsburgh Penguins Mike Matheson; Colton Sceviour
September 26, 2020	To Detroit Red Wings Marc Staal; 2nd-round pick in 2021	To New York Rangers future considerations
September 28, 2020	To Chicago Blackhawks Brandon Pirri	To Vegas Golden Knights Dylan Sikura

=== October (2020) ===
October 2, 2020	To Ottawa Senators Josh Brown	To Florida Panthers 4th-round pick in 2020
October 4, 2020	To Los Angeles Kings Olli Maatta*	To Chicago Blackhawks Brad Morrison
October 5, 2020	To San Jose Sharks Ryan Donato	To Minnesota Wild PIT 3rd-round pick in 2021
October 5, 2020	To San Jose Sharks Devan Dubnyk*; 7th-round pick in 2022	To Minnesota Wild 5th-round pick in 2022

== Waivers ==
Once an NHL player has played in a certain number of games or a set number of seasons has passed since the signing of his first NHL contract (see here), that player must be offered to all of the other NHL teams before he can be assigned to a minor league affiliate.

Date	Player	New team	Previous team	Ref
October 1, 2019	Eric Comrie	Arizona Coyotes	Winnipeg Jets	
October 1, 2019	Carl Dahlstrom	Winnipeg Jets	Chicago Blackhawks	
October 23, 2019	Luca Sbisa	Winnipeg Jets	Anaheim Ducks	
December 4, 2019	Nick Shore	Winnipeg Jets	Toronto Maple Leafs	
December 19, 2019	Eric Comrie	Winnipeg Jets	Detroit Red Wings	
December 19, 2019	Stefan Noesen	San Jose Sharks	Pittsburgh Penguins	
February 3, 2020	Nick Seeler	Chicago Blackhawks	Minnesota Wild	
February 17, 2020	Jayce Hawryluk	Ottawa Senators	Florida Panthers	
February 21, 2020	Cody Goloubef	Detroit Red Wings	Ottawa Senators	
February 24, 2020	Andrew Agozzino	Anaheim Ducks	Pittsburgh Penguins	
February 24, 2020	Dmytro Timashov	Detroit Red Wings	Toronto Maple Leafs	

== See also ==
- 2019 NHL entry draft
- 2020 NHL entry draft
- 2019 in ice hockey
- 2020 in ice hockey
- 2018–19 NHL transactions
- 2020–21 NHL transactions
