= 2018–19 Liiga season =

2018–19 SM-liiga
- League: SM-liiga
- Sport: Ice hockey
- Duration: September 2018 – April 2019
- Number of teams: 15
- TV partner(s): Telia

Regular season
- Best record: Kärpät
- Runners-up: Tappara
- Season MVP: Oliwer Kaski (Pelicans)
- Top scorer: Malte Strömwall (KooKoo)

Playoffs
- Playoffs MVP: Otto Paajanen (HPK)
- Finals champions: HPK
- Runners-up: Kärpät

SM-liiga seasons
- ← 2017–18 2019–20 →

The 2018–19 SM-liiga season was the 44th season of the SM-liiga, the top level of ice hockey in Finland, since the league's formation in 1975.

== Teams ==
Location of teams in 2018–2019 SM-liiga

Team	City	Head coach	Arena	Capacity	Captain
HIFK	Helsinki	~~Ari-Pekka Selin~~25 Jan 2019; Jarno Pikkarainen	Helsingin jäähalli	8,200	Lennart Petrell
HPK	Hämeenlinna	Antti Pennanen	Patria-areena	5,360	Otto Paajanen
Ilves	Tampere	Karri Kivi	Tampereen jäähalli	7,300	Eemeli Suomi
Jukurit	Mikkeli	Pekka Kangasalusta	Kalevankankaan jäähalli	4,200	Miika Roine
JYP	Jyväskylä	~~Lauri Merikivi~~14 Jan 2019; Risto Dufva	Synergia-areena	4,437	Juha-Pekka Hytönen
KalPa	Kuopio	Sami Kapanen	Niiralan monttu	5,300	Tommi Jokinen
KooKoo	Kouvola	~~Tuomas Tuokkola~~8 Jan 2019; Mikko Heiskanen	Lumon arena	6,000	Toni Kähkönen
Kärpät	Oulu	Mikko Manner	Oulun Energia Areena	6,614	Atte Ohtamaa
Lukko	Rauma	Pekka Virta	Äijänsuo Arena	5,000	Janne Niskala
Pelicans	Lahti	Ville Nieminen	Isku Areena	5,371	Hannes Björninen
SaiPa	Lappeenranta	Tero Lehterä	Kisapuisto	4,820	Ville Koho
Sport	Vaasa	Ari-Pekka Pajuluoma	Vaasa Arena	4,164	Erik Riska
Tappara	Tampere	Jukka Rautakorpi	Tampereen jäähalli	7,300	Kristian Kuusela
TPS	Turku	Kalle Kaskinen	HK Arena	11,820	Lauri Korpikoski
Ässät	Pori	~~Mikael Kotkaniemi~~ 9 Nov 2018; Pasi Kaukoranta	Porin jäähalli	6,350	Tommi Taimi

== Regular season ==
Top six advanced straight to the quarter-finals, while teams between 7th and 10th positions played a wild card round for the final two spots. The SM-liiga is a closed series and thus there is no relegation.

Pos	Team	Pld	W	OTW	OTL	L	GF	GA	GD	Pts	Final Result
1	Kärpät	60	41	6	2	11	207	101	+106	137	Advance to Quarterfinals
2	Tappara	60	32	3	6	19	177	150	+27	108	Advance to Quarterfinals
3	Pelicans	60	30	3	8	19	199	154	+45	104	Advance to Quarterfinals
4	TPS	60	29	5	6	20	164	152	+12	103	Advance to Quarterfinals
5	HPK (C)	60	25	8	8	19	168	147	+21	99	Advance to Quarterfinals
6	HIFK	60	24	8	10	18	182	169	+13	98	Advance to Quarterfinals
7	Lukko	60	26	5	8	21	170	165	+5	96	Advance to Wild-card round
8	Ilves	60	23	8	6	23	169	170	−1	91	Advance to Wild-card round
9	SaiPa	60	21	10	5	24	156	162	−6	88	Advance to Wild-card round
10	JYP	60	17	12	7	24	145	155	−10	82	Advance to Wild-card round
11	Sport	60	17	11	8	24	182	205	−23	81	
12	KalPa	60	18	7	8	27	153	186	−33	76	
13	KooKoo	60	18	6	7	29	157	197	−40	73	
14	Jukurit	60	13	8	12	27	145	179	−34	67	
15	Ässät	60	9	7	6	38	117	199	−82	47	

Source: Liiga
(C) Champion

Rules for classification: 1) Points; 2) 3-point wins 3) Goal difference; 4) Goals scored; 4) Head-to-head points.

== Playoffs ==
=== Bracket ===
Wild-card round (best-of-3)
8	Ilves	2
9	SaiPa	1
7	Lukko	2
10	JYP	1

Quarter-finals (best-of-7)
1	Kärpät	4
8	Ilves	0
3	Pelicans	2
6	HIFK	4
2	Tappara	4
7	Lukko	0
4	TPS	1
5	HPK	4

Semi-finals (best-of-7)
1	Kärpät	4
6	HIFK	2
(Pairings are re-seeded after the first and second round)
2	Tappara	2
5	HPK	4

Finals (best-of-7)
1	Kärpät	3
5	HPK	4
Bronze medal game
2	Tappara	1
6	HIFK	0

=== Wild card round ===
Lukko – JYP 2-1
16.3.2019	Lukko	JYP	5-1 ref
17.3.2019	JYP	Lukko	4-1 ref
19.3.2019	Lukko	JYP	4-1 ref
Lukko wins the series 2-1.

Ilves – SaiPa 2-1
16.3.2019	Ilves	SaiPa	3-2 OT1 ref
17.3.2019	SaiPa	Ilves	3-2 OT1 ref
19.3.2019	Ilves	SaiPa	4-2 ref
Ilves wins the series 2-1.

=== Quarterfinals ===
Kärpät – Ilves 4-0
22.3.2019	Kärpät	Ilves	4-3 OT1 ref
23.3.2019	Ilves	Kärpät	0-4 ref
25.3.2019	Kärpät	Ilves	2-1 ref
27.3.2019	Ilves	Kärpät	2-3 OT1 ref
Kärpät wins the series 4-0.

Pelicans – HIFK 2-4
21.3.2019	Pelicans	HIFK	6-0 ref
23.3.2019	HIFK	Pelicans	3-2 ref
25.3.2019	Pelicans	HIFK	1-2 OT1 ref
27.3.2019	HIFK	Pelicans	3-1 ref
29.3.2019	Pelicans	HIFK	5-1 ref
30.3.2019	HIFK	Pelicans	2-1 ref
HIFK wins the series 4-2

Tappara – Lukko 4-0
22.3.2019	Tappara	Lukko	3-2 ref
23.3.2019	Lukko	Tappara	2-3 ref
25.3.2019	Tappara	Lukko	3-2 ref
27.3.2019	Lukko	Tappara	1-2 ref
Tappara wins the series 4-0.

TPS – HPK 1-4
21.3.2019	TPS	HPK	2-3 ref
23.3.2019	HPK	TPS	5-3 ref
25.3.2019	TPS	HPK	3-2 OT1 ref
27.3.2019	HPK	TPS	2-1 ref
29.3.2019	TPS	HPK	2-3 OT1 ref
HPK wins the series 4-1.

=== Semifinals ===
Kärpät – HIFK 4-2
3.4.2019	Kärpät	HIFK	3-2 OT1 ref
5.4.2019	HIFK	Kärpät	3-2 ref
6.4.2019	Kärpät	HIFK	3-0 ref
8.4.2019	HIFK	Kärpät	2-0 ref
12.4.2019	Kärpät	HIFK	2-1 OT1 ref
15.4.2019	HIFK	Kärpät	0-3 ref
Kärpät wins the series 4-2.

Tappara – HPK 2-4
4.4.2019	Tappara	HPK	1-0 ref
6.4.2019	HPK	Tappara	4-1 ref
9.4.2019	Tappara	HPK	3-2 OT1 ref
11.4.2019	HPK	Tappara	2-1 OT1 ref
13.4.2019	Tappara	HPK	2-3 ref
15.4.2019	HPK	Tappara	4-3 ref
HPK wins the series 4-2.

=== Bronze medal game ===
19 April 2019; 18:30	Tappara	3–2 OT1 (0–0, 2–0, 0–2, 1–0)	HIFK	Tampere Ice Stadium, Tampere; Attendance: 5,002

Game reference

Christian Heljanko
Goalies
Atte Engren
Referees:
Jukka-Pekka Koistinen
Jari Levonen
Linesmen:
Pasi Nieminen
Teemu Riikonen

Ojamäki (Järvinen, Záborský) – 21:09	1–0
Rauhala (Karjalainen, Kemiläinen) – 28:03	2–0
	2–1	42:39 – Eronen (Salminen, Tyrväinen)
	2–2	56:32 – Tyrväinen (Varakas)
Záborský (Malinen, Suhonen) PP1 – 75:11	3–2

6 min
Penalties
14 min
28
Shots
28

=== Finals ===
20 April 2019; 17:00	Kärpät	4–1 (1–1, 0–0, 3–0)	HPK	Oulun Energia Areena, Oulu; Attendance: 6,200

Game reference

Veini Vehviläinen
Goalies
Emil Larmi
Referees:
Antti Boman
Mikko Kaukokari
Linesmen:
Henri Neva
Hannu Sormunen

	0–1	07:18 – Turunen (Innala, Nikkilä) PP1
Hakanpää (Kupari) – 18:49	1–1
Krištof (Lasu, Kupari) – 49:42	2–1
Kukkonen (Leskinen, Lasu) EN – 57:47	3–1
Leskinen (Vehviläinen) EN – 58:21	4–1

8 min
Penalties
31 min
21
Shots
16

23 April 2019; 18:30	HPK	3–1 (0–1, 2–0, 1–0)	Kärpät	Ritari-areena, Hämeenlinna; Attendance: 5,113

Game reference

Emil Larmi
Goalies
Veini Vehviläinen
Referees:
Stefan Fonselius
Kristian Vikman
Linesmen:
Joona Elonen
Markus Hägerström

	0–1	13:16 – Niemelä (Kupari, Hakanpää)
Tavi (Lucenius, Lindgren) PP1 – 29:13	1–1
Turunen (Paajanen, Puustinen) – 29:27	2–1
Tavi (Tuulola, Nenonen) PP1 – 41:57	3–1

8 min
Penalties
14 min
20
Shots
24

25 April 2019; 18:30	Kärpät	0–3 (0–1, 0–1, 0–1)	HPK	Oulun Energia Areena, Oulu; Attendance: 5,926

Game reference

Veini Vehviläinen
Goalies
Emil Larmi
Referees:
Antti Boman
Mikko Kaukokari
Linesmen:
Pasi Nieminen
Tommi Niittylä

0–1	01:14 – Nenonen (Leino, Innala)
0–2	33:14 – Riska (Kanninen)
0–3	59:04 – Tavi (Paajanen, Lindgren) EN

18 min
Penalties
20 min
19
Shots
17

27 April 2019; 17:00	HPK	2–4 (1–1, 1–2, 0–0)	Kärpät	Ritari-areena, Hämeenlinna; Attendance: 5,360

Game reference

Emil Larmi
Goalies
Veini Vehviläinen
Referees:
Antti Boman
Stefan Fonselius
Linesmen:
Lauri Nikulainen
Teemu Riikonen

Puustinen (Paajanen) – 04:19	1–0
	1–1	15:37 – Osala (Karvinen, Kivihalme) SH1
Turunen (Friman) – 20:46	2–1
	2–2	23:01 – Lindsten (Koblížek, Lasu)
	2–3	32:45 – Lindsten (Lasu, Koblížek)
	2–4	58:19 – Leskinen (Kukkonen) EN

2 min
Penalties
6 min
28
Shots
27

29 April 2019; 18:30	Kärpät	2–0 (1–0, 1–0, 0–0)	HPK	Oulun Energia Areena, Oulu; Attendance: 5,805

Game reference
Veini Vehviläinen	Goalies	Emil Larmi	Referees: Stefan Fonselius; Mikko Kaukokari; Linesmen: Pasi Nieminen; Hannu Sormunen
Kivihalme (Koblížek, Hakanpää) – 02:48 / 1–0; Karvinen – 38:21 / 2–0			Referees: Stefan Fonselius; Mikko Kaukokari; Linesmen: Pasi Nieminen; Hannu Sormunen
2 min	Penalties	0 min	Referees: Stefan Fonselius; Mikko Kaukokari; Linesmen: Pasi Nieminen; Hannu Sormunen
18	Shots	29	Referees: Stefan Fonselius; Mikko Kaukokari; Linesmen: Pasi Nieminen; Hannu Sormunen

2 May 2019; 18:30	HPK	1–0 (0–0, 1–0, 0–0)	Kärpät	Ritari-areena, Hämeenlinna; Attendance: 5,272

Game reference
Emil Larmi	Goalies	Veini Vehviläinen	Referees: Stefan Fonselius; Mikko Kaukokari; Linesmen: Joona Elonen; Lauri Nikulainen
Puustinen (Turunen) – 28:57 / 1–0			Referees: Stefan Fonselius; Mikko Kaukokari; Linesmen: Joona Elonen; Lauri Nikulainen
2 min	Penalties	2 min	Referees: Stefan Fonselius; Mikko Kaukokari; Linesmen: Joona Elonen; Lauri Nikulainen
18	Shots	27	Referees: Stefan Fonselius; Mikko Kaukokari; Linesmen: Joona Elonen; Lauri Nikulainen

4 May 2019; 17:00	Kärpät	1–2 OT1 (1–0, 0–1, 0–0, 0–1)	HPK	Oulun Energia Areena, Oulu; Attendance: 6,200

Game reference

Veini Vehviläinen
Goalies
Emil Larmi
Referees:
Stefan Fonselius
Mikko Kaukokari
Linesmen:
Joona Elonen
Lauri Nikulainen

Lindsten (Heshka, Leskinen) PP1 – 07:41	1–0
	1–1	34:16 – Laatikainen (Puustinen, Turunen)
	1–2	75:24 – Nenonen (Lucenius, Laatikainen) PP1

8 min
Penalties
8 min
33
Shots
18

HPK wins the finals 4-3.

== Final rankings ==
Gold medal	HPK
Silver medal	Kärpät
Bronze medal	Tappara
4	HIFK
5	Pelicans
6	TPS
7	Lukko
8	Ilves
9	SaiPa
10	JYP
11	Sport
12	KalPa
13	KooKoo
14	Jukurit
15	Ässät

== See also ==
- 2018–19 Mestis season
