= Teemu Kivihalme =

American-Finnish ice hockey player (born 1995)

- Born: June 17, 1995 (age 31) Cloquet, Minnesota, U.S.
- Height: 6 ft 0 in (183 cm)
- Weight: 185 lb (84 kg; 13 st 3 lb)
- Position: Defenseman
- Shoots: Left
- Liiga team Former teams: SaiPa; Oulun Kärpät; Toronto Marlies; HC TPS; Malmö Redhawks
- NHL draft: 140th overall, 2013; Nashville Predators
- Playing career: 2017–present

Teemu Kivihalme (born June 17, 1995) is an American-Finnish professional ice hockey defenseman who is currently playing with SaiPa of the Liiga. He was selected by the Nashville Predators in the fifth round, 140th overall, of the 2013 NHL entry draft.

== Playing career ==
Kivihalme played junior hockey with the Fargo Force of the United States Hockey League (USHL) when he was selected in the fifth round, 140th overall, of the 2013 NHL entry draft by the Nashville Predators. Committing to a collegiate career with Colorado College, Kivihalme played three seasons with the Tigers from 2014 to 2017, totalling 36 points in 107 NCAA games.

Un-signed from the Predators, Kivihalme returned to his Finnish roots, in beginning his professional career with Oulun Kärpät of the Finnish Liiga. In the 2017–18 season, Kivihalme quickly established himself as a regular on the blueline for the contending Kärpät. He scored 4 goals and 20 points in 44 games, and appeared in each post-season contest in helping capture the Liiga championship.

In 60 games during the 2018–19 season, Kivihalme built upon his rookie year in recording 9 goals and 21 assists for 30 points, which ranked ninth among Liiga defencemen in scoring. He contributed with 9 points in 16 playoff games in helping Oulu return to the Liiga Championship finals.

On May 7, 2019, Kivihalme gained NHL interest and was signed to a one-year, entry-level contract with the Toronto Maple Leafs.

On August 8, 2022, Kivihalme signed a one-year contract with HC TPS of the Finnish Liiga for the following 2022-23 season.

After two seasons with Malmö Redhawks of the Swedish Hockey League, Kivihalme opted to return to the Liiga in Finland, agreeing to a one-year contract with SaiPa for the 2025–26 season on 20 June 2025.

== Personal life ==
Kivihalme was born in the United States to a Finnish father, Janne Kivihalme, and an American mother, Shanda Christie, and is a dual citizen of Finland and the US. His father played collegiate hockey with the University of Wisconsin–Superior.

== Career statistics ==
=== Regular season and playoffs ===
			Regular season					Playoffs
Season	Team	League	GP	G	A	Pts	PIM	GP	G	A	Pts	PIM
2010–11	Burnsville High	USHS	25	3	11	14	12	2	0	0	0	0
2011–12	Burnsville High	USHS	25	8	21	29	25	3	1	1	2	0
2012–13	Burnsville High	USHS	25	9	21	30	22	3	0	1	1	2
2012–13	Fargo Force	USHL	4	0	1	1	0	—	—	—	—	—
2013–14	Fargo Force	USHL	47	3	9	12	12	—	—	—	—	—
2014–15	Colorado College	NCHC	35	5	6	11	10	—	—	—	—	—
2015–16	Colorado College	NCHC	36	3	12	15	28	—	—	—	—	—
2016–17	Colorado College	NCHC	36	2	8	10	56	—	—	—	—	—
2017–18	Oulun Kärpät	Liiga	44	4	16	20	18	18	0	0	0	20
2018–19	Oulun Kärpät	Liiga	60	9	21	30	18	16	4	5	9	6
2019–20	Toronto Marlies	AHL	55	4	14	18	26	—	—	—	—	—
2020–21	Toronto Marlies	AHL	20	6	5	11	14	—	—	—	—	—
2021–22	Toronto Marlies	AHL	32	1	6	7	16	—	—	—	—	—
2022–23	HC TPS	Liiga	58	5	15	20	24	3	1	0	1	2
2023–24	Malmö Redhawks	SHL	29	6	6	12	6	—	—	—	—	—
2024–25	Malmö Redhawks	SHL	43	2	12	14	8	8	2	0	2	0
Liiga totals			162	18	52	70	60	37	5	5	10	28

=== International ===
Year	Team	Event	Result	GP	G	A	Pts	PIM
2012	United States	IH18	7th	4	0	0	0	0
Junior totals				4	0	0	0	0

== Awards & honors ==
Award	Year
Liiga
Kanada-malja (Oulun Kärpät)	2018
