= Ville-Valtteri Leskinen =

Finnish ice hockey player

- Born: 18 February 1994 (age 31) Oulu, Finland
- Height: 6 ft 1 in (185 cm)
- Weight: 185 lb (84 kg; 13 st 3 lb)
- Position: Forward
- Shoots: Right
- team Former teams: Free agent Hokki; KalPa; Peliitat; Vaasan Sport; Oulun Kärpät; Färjestad BK; HIFK; KooKoo
- Playing career: 2013–present

Ville-Valtteri Leskinen (born 18 February 1994) is a Finnish professional ice hockey forward who is currently a free agent. He last played with KooKoo of the Finnish Liiga.

He previously played with Oulun Kärpät of the Finnish Liiga, winning the Kanada-malja in the 2017–18 season.

After establishing his professional career in three successful seasons with Oulun, Leskinen left as a free agent following the 2018–19 season. On 26 June 2019, Leskinen signed a two-year contract with Swedish club, Färjestad BK of the Swedish Hockey League (SHL).

== Awards and honours ==
Award	Year
Jr. A
All-Star Team	2013
Liiga
Kanada-malja (Oulun Kärpät)	2018
All-Star Team	2019
Veli-Pekka Ketola trophy	2019
