= Valtteri Puustinen =

Finnish ice hockey player (born 1999)

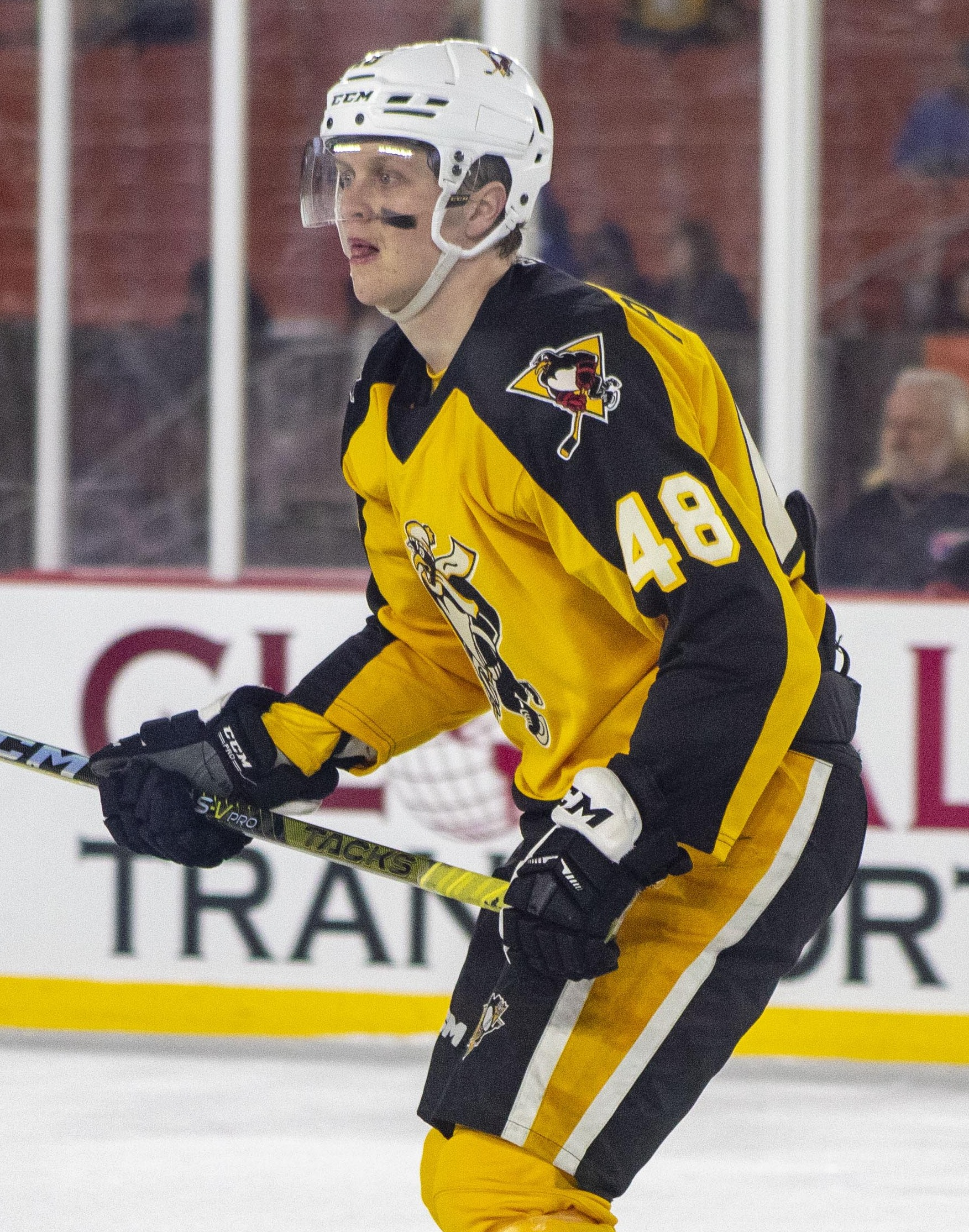
- Puustinen playing with the Wilkes-Barre/Scranton Penguins in the 2023 AHL Outdoor Classic
- Born: 4 June 1999 (age 27) Kuopio, Finland
- Height: 5 ft 10 in (178 cm)
- Weight: 182 lb (83 kg; 13 st 0 lb)
- Position: Winger
- Shoots: Right
- SHL team Former teams: Luleå HF; HPK; Pittsburgh Penguins
- National team: Finland
- NHL draft: 203rd overall, 2019; Pittsburgh Penguins
- Playing career: 2018–present

Valtteri Puustinen (born 4 June 1999) is a Finnish professional ice hockey player who is a winger for Luleå HF of the Swedish Hockey League (SHL). He made his National Hockey League debut in 2022 with the Pittsburgh Penguins.

== Playing career ==
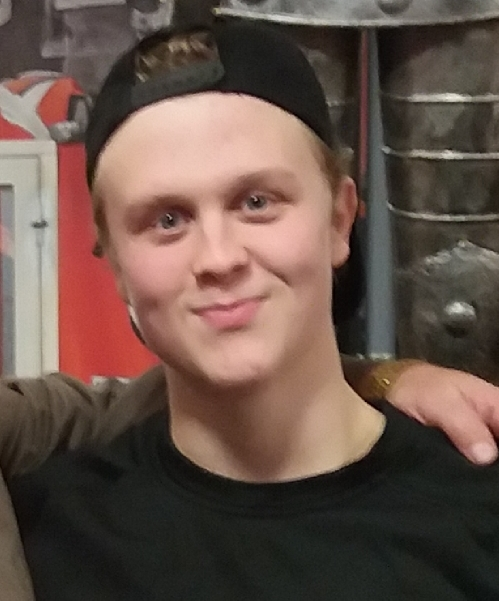
Puustinen in 2018, during his time playing for HPK

Puustinen played as a youth within the HPK organization of the Finnish Liiga. He was drafted 203rd overall by the Pittsburgh Penguins in the 2019 NHL entry draft.

Puustinen made his Liiga debut for HPK during the 2018–19 Liiga season. He played 47 regular-season games and scored 10 goals.

In the 2020–21 season with HPK, Puustinen recorded 21 goals and 20 assists for 41 points in 51 games. His 21 goals led all HPK skaters and were tied for eighth in the league. He was one of just four skaters in Liiga to record 20 or more goals and assists.

On 6 May 2021, Puustinen was signed by the Pittsburgh Penguins to a two-year, entry-level contract. After scoring 17 goals and assists each with the Penguins' American Hockey League (AHL) affiliate, the Wilkes-Barre/Scranton Penguins, Puustinen was called up by the Penguins and played his first National Hockey League (NHL) game on 11 March 2022 against the Vegas Golden Knights. He scored his first NHL point that night, a secondary assist on Jeff Carter's goal, as the Penguins won 5–2. On 20 June 2023, he was re-signed to a one-year, two-way contract by Pittsburgh.

During the 2023–24 season, on 27 December 2023, Puustinen scored his first NHL goal in a 7–0 victory over the New York Islanders.

Puustinen was traded by the Penguins to the Colorado Avalanche during the 2025–26 season on 20 January 2026, in exchange for Ilya Solovyov. Immediately reassigned to affiliate, the Colorado Eagles, Puustinen played out the remainder of the season in the AHL, posting 14 points through 24 regular season games and limited to 6 games in the post-season for 2 points.

As a pending restricted free agent with the Avalanche, Puustinen opted to return to Europe after securing a two-year contract with Swedish top-tier club, Luleå HF, on 10 June 2026.

== Career statistics ==
Medal record

Men's ice hockey

Representing Finland

World Championships
Silver medal – second place	2021 Latvia	

World Junior Championships
Gold medal – first place	2019 Canada	

=== Regular season and playoffs ===
			Regular season					Playoffs
Season	Team	League	GP	G	A	Pts	PIM	GP	G	A	Pts	PIM
2017–18	HPK	Jr. A	52	15	19	34	14	5	1	3	4	4
2018–19	HPK	Jr. A	11	3	6	9	6	—	—	—	—	—
2018–19	HPK	Liiga	47	10	3	13	14	16	2	3	5	4
2019–20	HPK	Liiga	54	17	23	40	22	—	—	—	—	—
2020–21	HPK	Liiga	51	21	20	41	14	—	—	—	—	—
2021–22	Wilkes-Barre/Scranton Penguins	AHL	73	20	22	42	14	6	0	3	3	0
2021–22	Pittsburgh Penguins	NHL	1	0	1	1	0	—	—	—	—	—
2022–23	Wilkes-Barre/Scranton Penguins	AHL	72	24	35	59	22	—	—	—	—	—
2023–24	Wilkes-Barre/Scranton Penguins	AHL	24	5	8	13	4	2	1	2	3	2
2023–24	Pittsburgh Penguins	NHL	52	5	15	20	6	—	—	—	—	—
2024–25	Pittsburgh Penguins	NHL	13	2	1	3	4	—	—	—	—	—
2024–25	Wilkes-Barre/Scranton Penguins	AHL	48	16	19	35	6	2	0	0	0	0
2025–26	Wilkes-Barre/Scranton Penguins	AHL	35	7	19	26	6	—	—	—	—	—
2025–26	Colorado Eagles	AHL	24	5	9	14	10	6	1	1	2	4
Liiga totals			152	48	46	94	50	16	2	3	5	4
NHL totals			66	7	17	24	10	—	—	—	—	—

=== International ===
Year	Team	Event	Result	GP	G	A	Pts	PIM
2019	Finland	WJC	1st place, gold medalist(s)	6	0	3	3	4
2021	Finland	WC	2nd place, silver medalist(s)	2	0	0	0	0
2024	Finland	WC	8th	7	1	1	2	2
Junior totals				6	0	3	3	4
Senior totals				9	1	1	2	2
