= Teemu Turunen (ice hockey) =

- Born: 24 November 1995 (age 30) Helsinki, Finland
- Height: 1.79 m (5 ft 10 in)
- Weight: 84 kg (185 lb; 13 st 3 lb)
- Position: Left/Right wing
- Shoots: Left
- SHL team Former teams: Örebro HK; HPK; HIFK; HC Davos; Jokerit; Kärpät
- National team: Finland
- Playing career: 2014–present

Medal record

Representing Finland

Ice hockey

World Championships
| Silver medal – second place | 2021 Latvia | |

Teemu Turunen (born 24 November 1995 in Helsinki) is a Finnish professional ice hockey player currently under contract with Örebro HK of the Swedish Hockey League (SHL) and the Finnish national team.

On 5 May 2021, Turunen left HC Davos of the National League and signed as a free agent to a one-year deal with Finnish-based, Jokerit then of the Kontinental Hockey League (KHL).

He represented Finland at the 2021 IIHF World Championship.
