= Evan Rodrigues =

Canadian ice hockey player (born 1993)

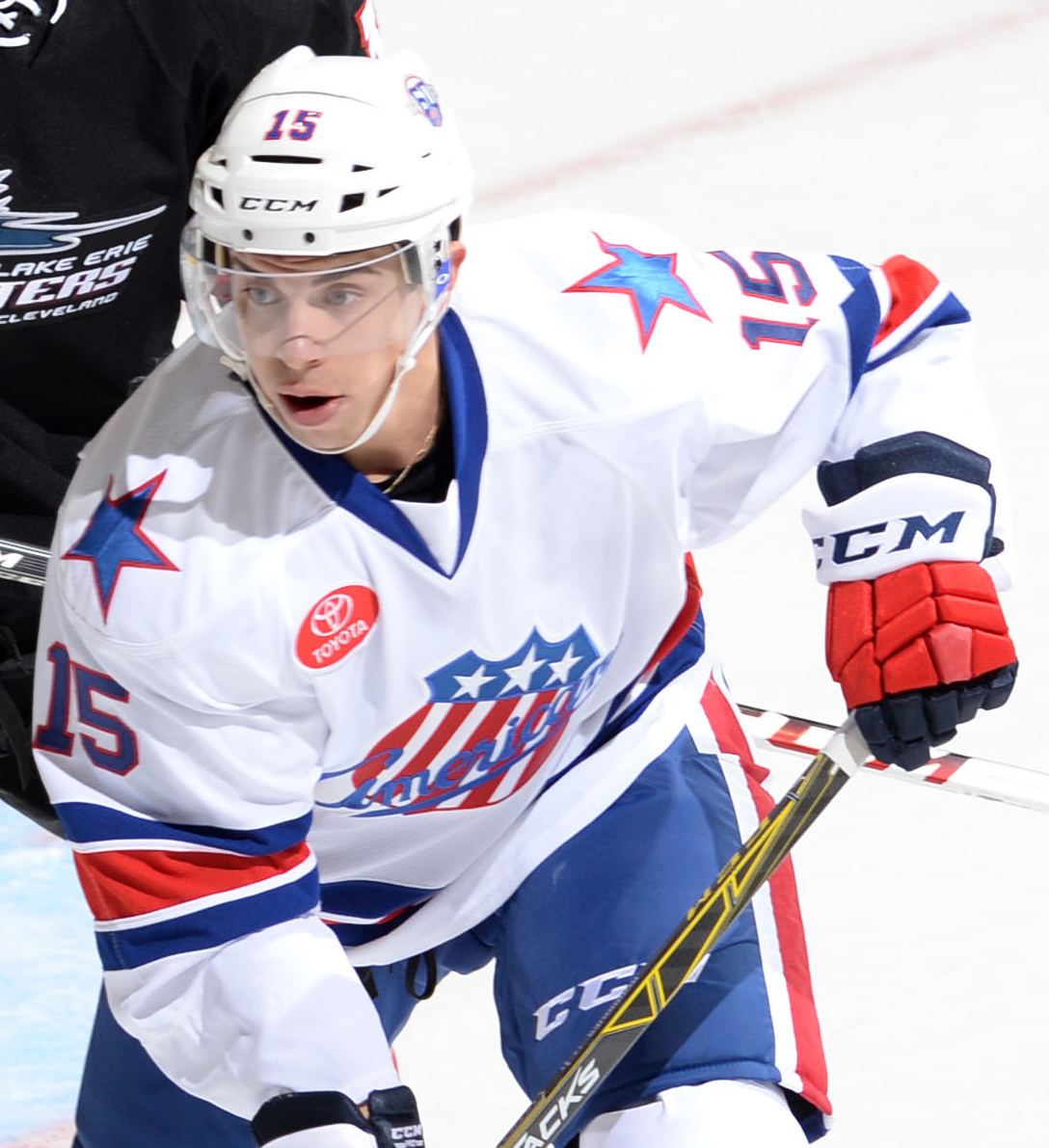
- Rodrigues with the Rochester Americans in 2015
- Born: July 28, 1993 (age 33) Etobicoke, Ontario, Canada
- Height: 5 ft 11 in (180 cm)
- Weight: 184 lb (83 kg; 13 st 2 lb)
- Position: Forward
- Shoots: Right
- NHL team Former teams: New Jersey Devils; Buffalo Sabres; Pittsburgh Penguins; Colorado Avalanche; Florida Panthers
- NHL draft: Undrafted
- Playing career: 2015–present

Evan Rodrigues (born July 28, 1993) is a Canadian professional ice hockey player who is a forward for the New Jersey Devils of the National Hockey League (NHL). He previously played for the Buffalo Sabres, Pittsburgh Penguins, Colorado Avalanche, and Florida Panthers, winning back-to-back Stanley Cups with the Panthers in 2024 and 2025.

== Early life ==
Rodrigues was born on July 28, 1993, in Etobicoke, Ontario, Canada to parents Christine and Norbert. His father is an immigrant from Portugal who moved to Canada as a teenager. Rodrigues was raised alongside two older brothers, and all three played ice hockey growing up.

== Playing career ==
=== Junior ===
Rodrigues played two seasons for the Georgetown Raiders of the Ontario Junior Hockey League (OJHL). He scored 105 points (41 goals, 64 assists) in 94 contests during the two seasons, and led his team to the playoffs in both seasons to advance to the 2010–2011 league semifinals. Rodrigues was named to the Team Canada East and earned All-Star Honours after scoring seven points (3 goals, 4 assists).

=== College ===
Rodrigues attended Boston University, where he played four seasons (2011–2015) with the Boston University Terriers men's ice hockey team, which competes in the NCAA Men's Division I Hockey East conference. A two time Hockey East Second-Team All-Star, Rodrigues tallied 121 points (42 goals, 79 assists) in 146 contests throughout his career as a BU Terrier. During his senior year, Rodrigues finished second in the nation in scoring with 61 points and was named Hockey East Player of the Month in both January and April 2015. Rodrigues was second only to teammate Jack Eichel.

=== Professional ===
On April 22, 2015, Rodrigues agreed to a two-way, entry-level contract with the Buffalo Sabres. He played most of the season with the Rochester Americans of the American Hockey League before receiving his first NHL call-up and playing his first game on April 8, 2016. He scored his first NHL goal and first NHL assist the following night in a game against the New York Islanders.

On July 27, 2017, the Sabres re-signed Rodrigues to a two-year, $1.3 million contract worth $650,000 annually.

Rodrigues joined the Sabres full-time during the 2018–19 season. In 74 games, he recorded nine goals and 20 assists.

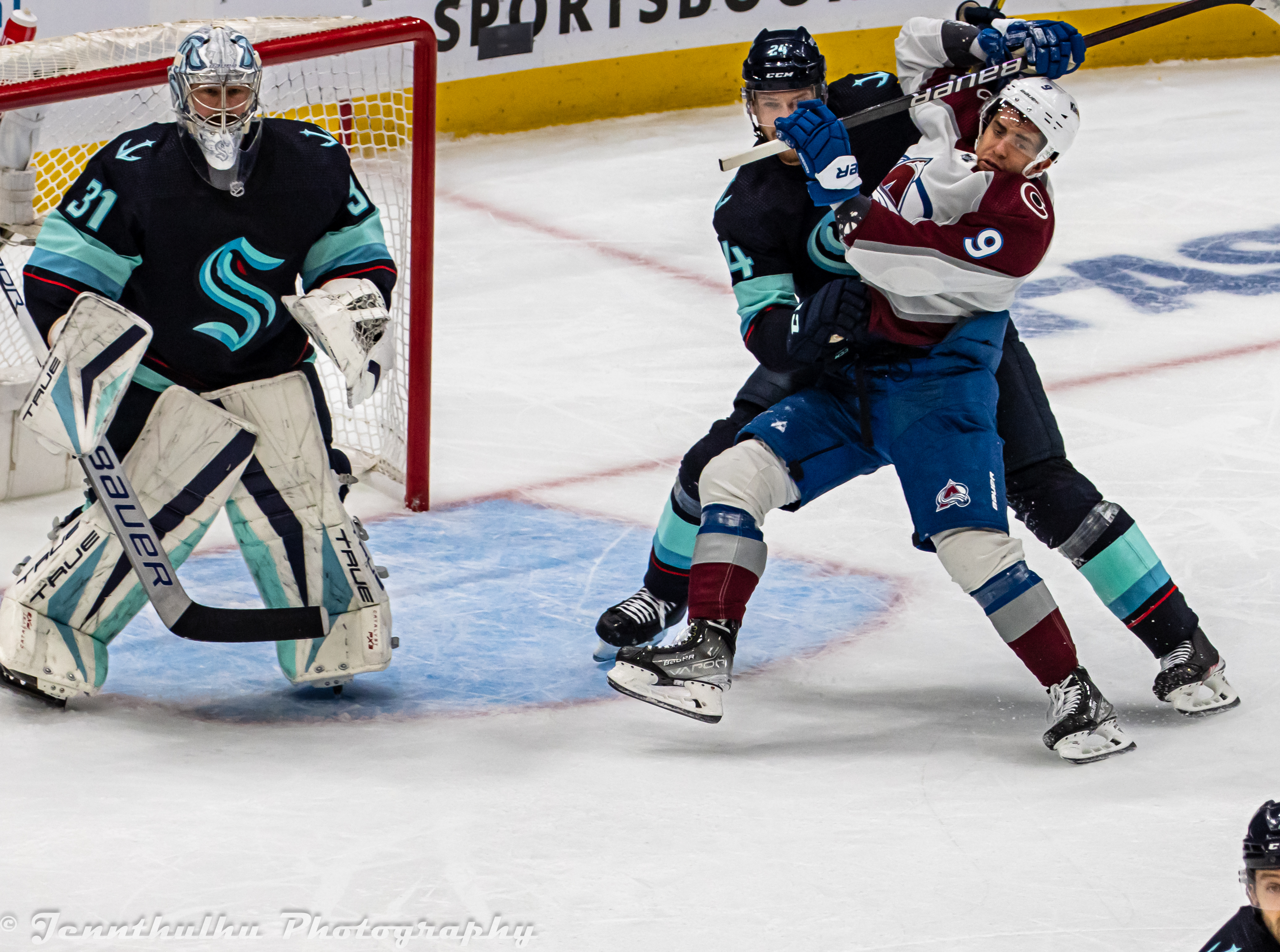
Rodrigues as a member of the Colorado Avalanche battles for position against Jamie Oleksiak (left) in 2023.

On July 25, 2019, the Sabres re-signed Rodrigues to a one-year, $2 million contract extension. In the following 2019–20 season, Rodrigues struggled to replicate his previous offensive totals with the Sabres, posting just 5 goals and 9 points through 38 games. At the trade deadline, Rodrigues was dealt by the Sabres, along with Conor Sheary to the Pittsburgh Penguins in exchange for Dominik Kahun on February 24, 2020.

On August 25, 2020, Rodrigues was traded by the Penguins to the Toronto Maple Leafs along with David Warsofsky, Filip Hållander and the 15th overall pick in the 2020 NHL entry draft in exchange for Kasperi Kapanen, Jesper Lindgren and Pontus Åberg. However, on October 9, 2020, unable to come to terms with Maple Leafs and having not received a qualifying offer, Rodrigues returned to Pittsburgh as a free agent on a one-year, $700,000 contract. He would be re-signed by the Penguins to a one-year, $1 million contract. On January 2, 2022, Rodrigues and Bryan Rust each recorded a hat-trick in the third period to lift the Penguins 8–5 over the San Jose Sharks. This was the first time since 2008 that the Penguins had two players record hat tricks in a single game. On September 12, 2022, Rodrigues as a free agent was signed to a one-year, $2 million deal with the defending Stanley Cup champion Colorado Avalanche.

Following his successful lone season with the Avalanche, Rodrigues left as a free agent and was signed to a four-year, $12 million contract with the Florida Panthers on July 2, 2023.

On June 30, 2026, Rodrigues was traded to the New Jersey Devils, alongside Jesper Boqvist and Ben Steeves, in exchange for Angus Crookshank and Jacob Markström.

== Personal life ==
Evan and his wife Christina have three children together.

== Career statistics ==
Medal record

Ice hockey

Representing Canada East

World Junior A Challenge
Silver medal – second place	2010 Penticton	

=== Regular season and playoffs ===
			Regular season					Playoffs
Season	Team	League	GP	G	A	Pts	PIM	GP	G	A	Pts	PIM
2009–10	Georgetown Raiders	OJHL	56	20	31	51	22	11	4	2	6	2
2010–11	Georgetown Raiders	OJHL	37	21	33	54	42	5	1	3	4	0
2011–12	Boston University	HE	36	2	10	12	24	—	—	—	—	—
2012–13	Boston University	HE	38	14	20	34	28	—	—	—	—	—
2013–14	Boston University	HE	31	5	9	14	20	—	—	—	—	—
2014–15	Boston University	HE	41	21	40	61	31	—	—	—	—	—
2015–16	Rochester Americans	AHL	72	9	21	30	39	—	—	—	—	—
2015–16	Buffalo Sabres	NHL	2	1	1	2	0	—	—	—	—	—
2016–17	Rochester Americans	AHL	48	9	21	30	27	—	—	—	—	—
2016–17	Buffalo Sabres	NHL	30	4	2	6	4	—	—	—	—	—
2017–18	Rochester Americans	AHL	8	5	5	10	2	—	—	—	—	—
2017–18	Buffalo Sabres	NHL	48	7	18	25	14	—	—	—	—	—
2018–19	Buffalo Sabres	NHL	74	9	20	29	25	—	—	—	—	—
2019–20	Buffalo Sabres	NHL	38	5	4	9	10	—	—	—	—	—
2019–20	Pittsburgh Penguins	NHL	7	1	0	1	4	—	—	—	—	—
2020–21	Pittsburgh Penguins	NHL	35	7	7	14	6	2	0	1	1	0
2021–22	Pittsburgh Penguins	NHL	82	19	24	43	14	7	3	2	5	4
2022–23	Colorado Avalanche	NHL	69	16	23	39	30	7	1	4	5	2
2023–24	Florida Panthers	NHL	80	12	27	39	34	24	7	8	15	4
2024–25	Florida Panthers	NHL	82	15	17	32	38	21	2	13	15	10
2025–26	Florida Panthers	NHL	69	11	20	31	38	—	—	—	—	—
NHL totals			616	107	163	270	217	61	13	28	41	20

=== International ===
Year	Team	Event	Result	GP	G	A	Pts	PIM
2010–11	Canada East	WJAC	2nd place, silver medalist(s)	5	3	4	7	2
Junior totals				5	3	4	7	2

== Awards and honours ==
Award	Year	Ref
NHL
Stanley Cup champion	2024, 2025	
