= Otto Karvinen =

Finnish ice hockey player

- Born: 8 April 1990 (age 36) Vantaa, Finland
- Height: 6 ft 1 in (185 cm)
- Weight: 187 lb (85 kg; 13 st 5 lb)
- Position: Forward
- Shoots: Left
- Liiga team Former teams: Kärpät; TPS; Vaasan Sport
- NHL draft: Undrafted
- Playing career: 2011–present

Otto Karvinen (born 8 April 1990) is a Finnish professional ice hockey player. He is currently playing for Kärpät of the Finnish Liiga.

Karvinen made his Liiga debut playing with TPS during the 2014-15 Liiga season.
