= David Warsofsky =

American ice hockey player (born 1990)

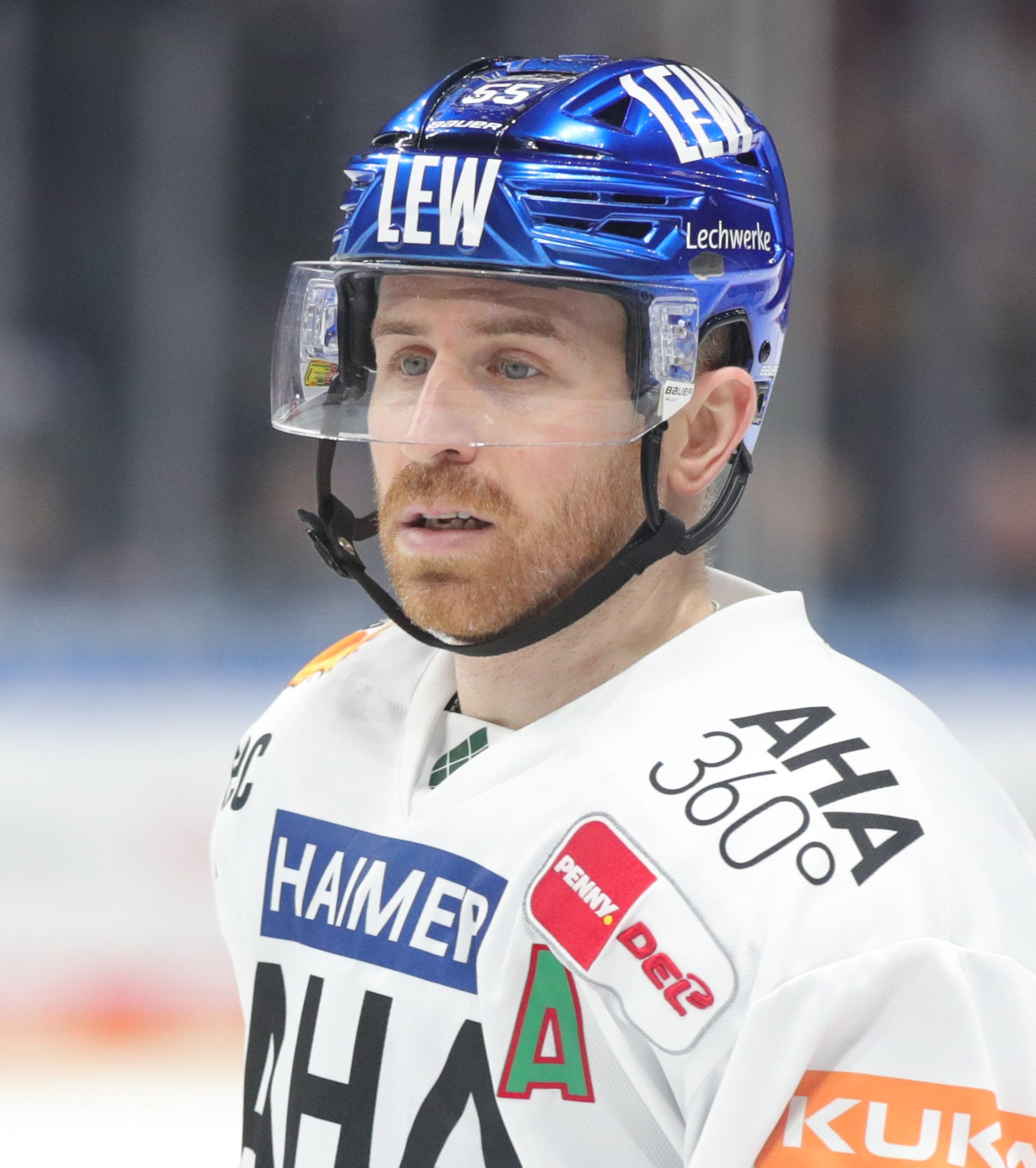
- Warsofsky with the Augsburger Panther in 2022
- Born: May 30, 1990 (age 36) Marshfield, Massachusetts, U.S.
- Height: 5 ft 9 in (175 cm)
- Weight: 174 lb (79 kg; 12 st 6 lb)
- Position: Defense
- Shot: Left
- Played for: Boston Bruins; Pittsburgh Penguins; New Jersey Devils; Colorado Avalanche; ERC Ingolstadt; Augsburger Panther
- National team: United States
- NHL draft: 95th overall, 2008; St. Louis Blues
- Playing career: 2011–2024

David Matthew Warsofsky (born May 30, 1990) is an American ice hockey coach in the Washington Capitals system who had been a defenseman who most recently played for Augsburger Panther of the Deutsche Eishockey Liga (DEL).

== Early life ==
Warsofsky is of Polish origin. He is Jewish, and was born in Marshfield, Massachusetts, the son of Dawn and Mark Warsofsky. His brother Ryan Warsofsky is the NHL ice hockey head coach for the San Jose Sharks.

He played at Marshfield High School in 2004–05 and at Cushing Academy in Ashburnham, Massachusetts for the following two years. He was named the 2007 U.S. Hockey Report's Prep Defenseman of the Year. Warsofsky was captain of the 2007–08 Under-18 United States men's national ice hockey team, where he tied as leader in assists and was second in points. The team won a bronze medal at the 2008 IIHF World U18 Championship.

== Playing career ==
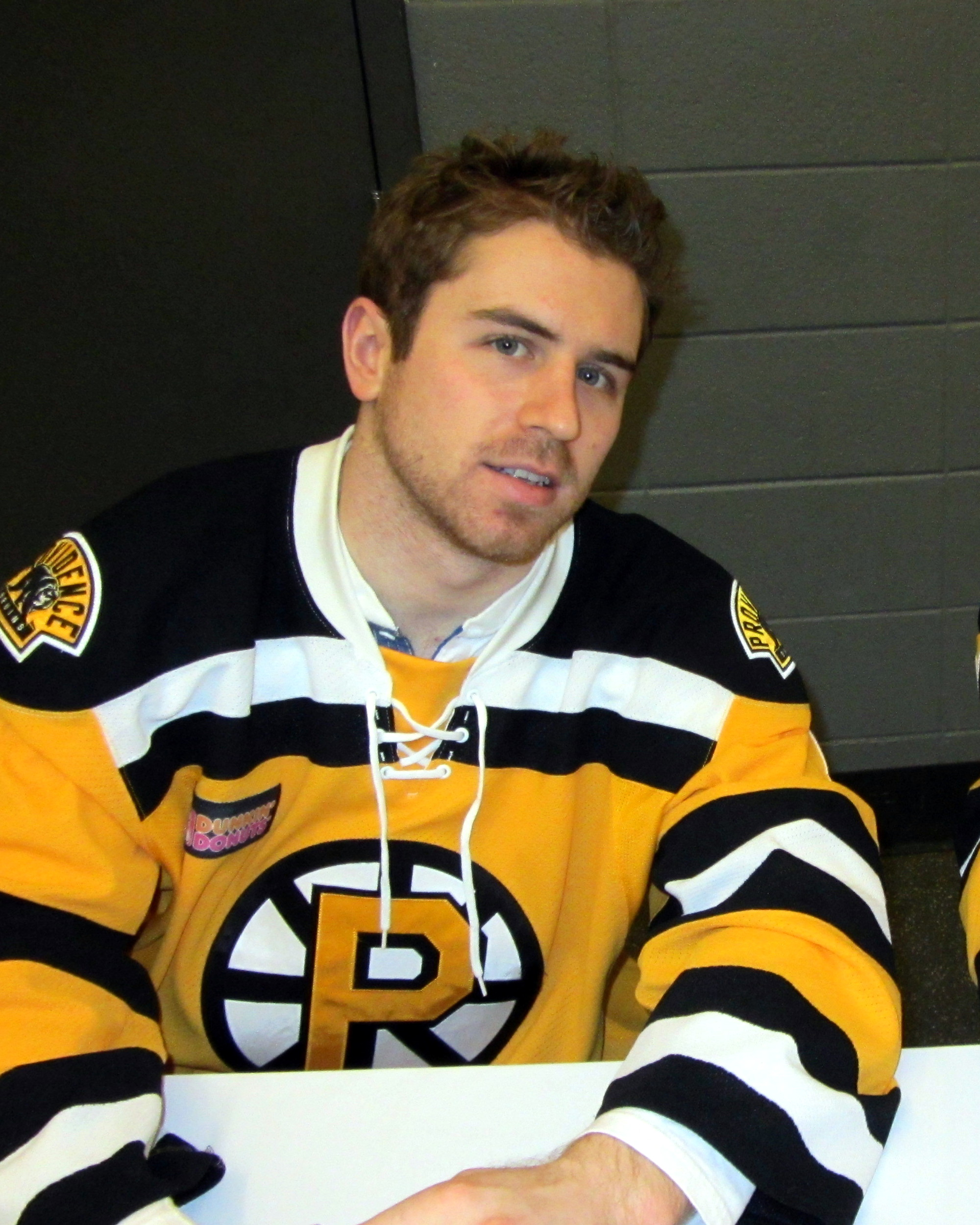
Warsofsky in 2012, during his time with the Providence Bruins.

Warsofsky was selected by the St. Louis Blues in the 4th round (95th overall) of the 2008 NHL entry draft. Instead of turning pro immediately, he played for Boston University in the Hockey East and was a member of the 2009 national championship team as a freshman. He played for Team USA in 2010, winning the World Junior Ice Hockey Championships.

On June 26, 2010, the Blues traded Warsofsky's rights to the Boston Bruins in exchange for Vladimír Sobotka. He then played four consecutive seasons solely for the Bruins' American Hockey League (AHL) affiliate, the Providence Bruins.

On December 18, 2013, the Bruins recalled Warsofsky from Providence. He is the first Bruin to wear the number 79. He made his NHL debut the following night in a 4–2 loss to the Buffalo Sabres. On December 28, Warsofsky scored his first career NHL goal in a 4–3 loss to the Ottawa Senators. He finished the season with two points in six games for Boston, as well as 32 in 56 with Providence.

On July 1, 2015, Warsofsky signed a one-year, two-way contract with the Pittsburgh Penguins. He skated in 12 games for the Penguins during the 2015–16 season, recording one goal. On February 26, 2016, the New Jersey Devils claimed Warsofsky off waivers. He finished the season with one assist in ten games for the Devils.

On July 1, 2016, Warsofsky returned to the Penguins, signing a one-year, two-way contract. He spent the majority of the 2016–17 season with Wilkes-Barre, where he led all team defensemen with 47 points in 58 contests, all career-highs. He also skated in seven games with Pittsburgh, recording one assist.

On July 1, 2017, Warsofsky signed a two-year contract with the Colorado Avalanche. Aside from a 16-game stint with the Avalanche in the 2017–18 season, he primarily played for the team's affiliates, the San Antonio Rampage and the Colorado Eagles.

On July 1, 2019, Warsofsky returned to the Penguins for a second time, signing a two-year, two-way contract. He was named captain of Wilkes-Barre/Scranton, and led the defense with 33 points in 51 games.

On August 25, 2020, Warsofsky was traded by the Penguins to the Toronto Maple Leafs along with Evan Rodrigues, Filip Hallander, and the 15th overall pick in the 2020 NHL entry draft in exchange for Kasperi Kapanen, Jesper Lindgren and Pontus Aberg.

On February 15, 2021, Warsofsky was traded to the Carolina Hurricanes along with Yegor Korshkov in exchange for Alex Galchenyuk. In the 2020–21 season, the Hurricanes assigned Warsofsky to join AHL affiliate, the Chicago Wolves, to be coached by his brother Ryan. Limited to 22 regular season games, he produced 17 assists and 19 points.

A free agent from the Hurricanes, Warsofsky left North America by signing his first contract abroad, agreeing to a one-year contract with German club ERC Ingolstadt of the Deutsche Eishockey Liga (DEL) on June 18, 2021.

== Front Office and Coaching ==
During the 2024-25 ECHL season, Warsofsky served as a special advisor to Jared Nightingale at the ECHL's South Carolina Stingrays, which had previously hired his brother in his first head coaching gig. After Nightingale left to join an AHL club, on June 23, 2025, David Warsofsky was named the club's thirteenth head coach and Director of Hockey Operations, the same position his brother had held with the Stingrays from 2016 to 2018.

== Career statistics ==
=== Regular season and playoffs ===
			Regular season					Playoffs
Season	Team	League	GP	G	A	Pts	PIM	GP	G	A	Pts	PIM
2005–06	Cushing Academy	HS-MA	36	8	26	34	28	—	—	—	—	—
2006–07	Cushing Academy	HS-MA	29	15	34	49	55	—	—	—	—	—
2007–08	U.S. National Development Team	NAHL	15	4	2	6	8	—	—	—	—	—
2008–09	Boston University	HE	45	3	20	23	28	—	—	—	—	—
2009–10	Boston University	HE	34	12	11	23	48	—	—	—	—	—
2010–11	Boston University	HE	34	7	15	22	46	—	—	—	—	—
2010–11	Providence Bruins	AHL	10	0	3	3	6	—	—	—	—	—
2011–12	Providence Bruins	AHL	66	5	24	29	18	—	—	—	—	—
2012–13	Providence Bruins	AHL	58	3	13	16	17	12	0	3	3	0
2013–14	Providence Bruins	AHL	56	6	26	32	11	12	2	7	9	2
2013–14	Boston Bruins	NHL	6	1	1	2	0	—	—	—	—	—
2014–15	Providence Bruins	AHL	40	4	11	15	20	5	0	1	1	0
2014–15	Boston Bruins	NHL	4	0	1	1	0	—	—	—	—	—
2015–16	Wilkes-Barre/Scranton Penguins	AHL	17	2	4	6	6	—	—	—	—	—
2015–16	Pittsburgh Penguins	NHL	12	1	0	1	0	—	—	—	—	—
2015–16	New Jersey Devils	NHL	10	0	1	1	2	—	—	—	—	—
2016–17	Wilkes-Barre/Scranton Penguins	AHL	58	16	31	47	32	5	3	3	6	0
2016–17	Pittsburgh Penguins	NHL	7	0	1	1	6	—	—	—	—	—
2017–18	San Antonio Rampage	AHL	47	4	16	20	24	—	—	—	—	—
2017–18	Colorado Avalanche	NHL	16	0	5	5	0	4	0	0	0	2
2018–19	Colorado Eagles	AHL	51	5	27	32	48	4	1	1	2	0
2019–20	Wilkes-Barre/Scranton Penguins	AHL	51	10	23	33	49	—	—	—	—	—
2020–21	Chicago Wolves	AHL	22	2	17	19	16	—	—	—	—	—
2021–22	ERC Ingolstadt	DEL	45	9	19	28	18	—	—	—	—	—
2022–23	Augsburger Panther	DEL	36	8	13	21	34	—	—	—	—	—
2023–24	Augsburger Panther	DEL	3	0	0	0	4	—	—	—	—	—
NHL totals			55	2	9	11	8	4	0	0	0	2

Medal record

Representing United States

World Junior Championships
Gold medal – first place	2010 Saskatchewan	

IIHF World U18 Championships
Bronze medal – third place	2008 Moscow	

=== International ===
Year	Team	Event	Result	GP	G	A	Pts	PIM
2008	United States	U18	3rd place, bronze medalist(s)	7	0	7	7	8
2010	United States	WJC	1st place, gold medalist(s)	7	0	2	2	6
2016	United States	WC	4th	10	1	4	5	2
2022	United States	OG	5th	4	0	0	0	0
Junior totals				14	0	9	9	14
Senior totals				14	1	4	5	2

== Awards and honors ==
Award	Year	Ref
College
Hockey East All-Second Team	2010–11	

== See also ==
- List of select Jewish ice hockey players
