= Pontus Åberg =

Swedish ice hockey player (born 1993)

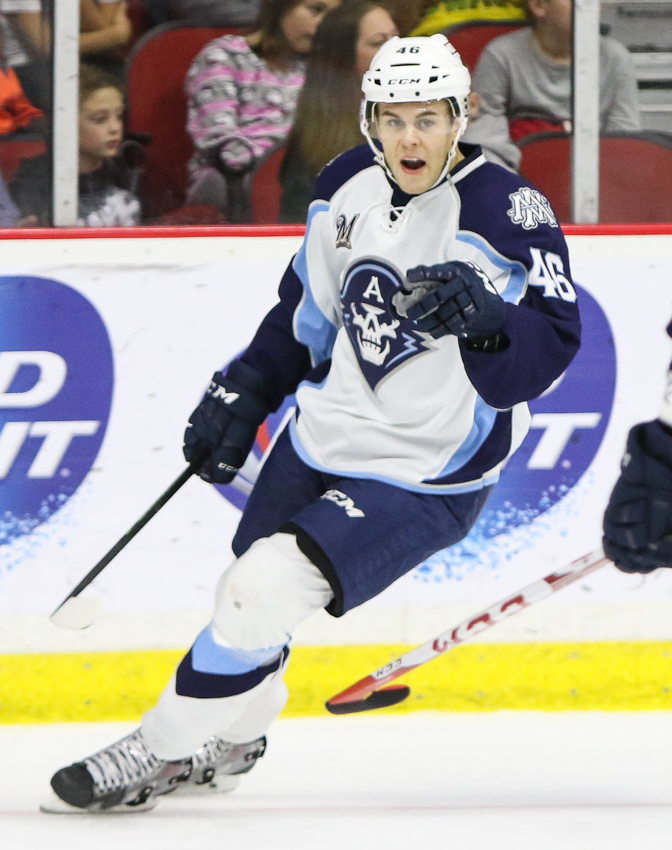
- Åberg with the Milwaukee Admirals in 2015
- Born: 23 September 1993 (age 33) Stockholm, Sweden
- Height: 5 ft 11 in (180 cm)
- Weight: 196 lb (89 kg; 14 st 0 lb)
- Position: Left wing
- Shoots: Right
- NL team Former teams: SC Rapperswil-Jona Lakers; Djurgårdens IF; Färjestad BK; Nashville Predators; Edmonton Oilers; Anaheim Ducks; Minnesota Wild; Toronto Maple Leafs; Traktor Chelyabinsk; Timrå IK; BK Mladá Boleslav; Barys Astana; SC Rapperswil-Jona Lakers
- NHL draft: 37th overall, 2012; Nashville Predators
- Playing career: 2011–present

Pontus Åberg (/ˈɔːbərɡ/ AW-bərg; born 23 September 1993) is a Swedish professional ice hockey forward currently under contract with ZSC Lions in the National League (NL). He was drafted in the second round of the 2012 NHL entry draft, 37th pick overall, by the Nashville Predators.

== Playing career ==
=== Professional ===
==== SHL ====
Åberg represented team Stockholm at the Rikspucken, a national tournament in Sweden. He made his Elitserien debut during the 2010–11 season, as an extra forward in the second game of the season against Modo Hockey, but did not get any time on the ice. Åberg extended his contract with Djurgården to the 2013–14 season in May 2011. Åberg played a total of five games, scoring two points in the 2011 edition of the pre-season tournament European Trophy. Åberg received his first time on the ice in an Elitserien game and also scored his first goal in Elitserien in the league premier against HV71 on 15 September 2011. He scored the game-winning goal in the shootouts against Färjestad BK on 29 September 2011.

After a start to the 2011–12 Elitserien season that included getting five goals and three assists in the first fourteen games, Åberg was announced to be the first of four candidates for that season's Elitserien Rookie of the Year.

In the 2013–14 season, Åberg transferred to play for fellow SHL club, Färjestad BK.

==== Nashville Predators ====
After signing an entry-level contract with the Predators, he began his first North American season in 2014–15 season playing for the Predators American Hockey League (AHL) affiliate, the Milwaukee Admirals. In the 2016–17 NHL season Åberg appeared in 15 regular season games posting 1 goal and 1 assist with the Predators. In the AHL Åberg was effective potting 31 goals in just 56 games with the Admirals. After Ryan Johansen went down in Game 4 of the Western Conference Finals and it was announced that Johansen would be out for the remainder of the playoffs, and with Predators captain Mike Fisher being sidelined as well, the Predators called upon Colton Sissons and Åberg to help carry the offensive load. In game 5 Åberg scored the game-winning goal in Anaheim in a 3–1 win to give the Predators a 3–2 series lead. In Game 6 at Bridgestone Arena, Åberg assisted 2 of Sissons' 3 goals to help the Predators advance to their first ever Stanley Cup Finals.

On 18 July 2017, the Predators re-signed Aberg to a two-year, $1.3 million contract worth $650,000 annually. During his time with the Predators', he was given the nickname "The Pope".

==== Edmonton Oilers ====
In the 2017–18 season, at the NHL trade deadline on 25 February 2018, Åberg was dealt by the Predators to the Edmonton Oilers in exchange for Mark Letestu. He made his Oilers debut on 27 February against the San Jose Sharks. He scored his first point as an Oiler in his debut with an assist on a goal from Jesse Puljujärvi, in a 5–2 loss to the Sharks. In remaining with the Oilers to play out the season, Åberg contributed with 2 goals and 8 points in 16 games.

==== Anaheim Ducks ====
After attending the Oilers 2018 training camp, Åberg was unable to retain his roster spot approaching the 2018–19 season. On 1 October 2018, he was claimed off waivers by the Anaheim Ducks. He made his debut with the Ducks in an opening night 5–2 victory over the San Jose Sharks on 3 October 2018. After a brief stint with AHL affiliate, the San Diego Gulls, Åberg returned to the Ducks scoring two goals in consecutive games on 28 and 30 October against the Sharks and Philadelphia Flyers. Through 37 games with the Ducks, Åberg had already eclipsed career highs offensively, placing second on the team with 11 goals and recording 19 points before he was relegated as a healthy scratch through a franchise record losing streak.

==== Minnesota Wild ====
On 16 January 2019, Åberg's tenure with the Ducks ended as he was dealt to the Minnesota Wild in exchange for Justin Kloos. Åberg was unable to replicate his offensive pace with the Wild, remaining on the roster through the conclusion of the regular season to post 1 goal and 6 points in 22 games. On 25 June 2019, Åberg was not tendered a qualifying offer by the Wild, releasing him to free agency.

==== Toronto Maple Leafs ====
On 24 July 2019, Åberg signed as a free agent to a one-year, $700,000 deal with the Toronto Maple Leafs. In the 2019–20 season, Åberg was primarily assigned to AHL affiliate, the Toronto Marlies. He was productive with the Marlies, registering 20 goals and 44 points in 55 games while making just 5 appearances with the Maple Leafs adding 1 assist. With the remainder of the AHL season cancelled due to the COVID-19 pandemic, Åberg as an impending restricted free agent returned to his native Sweden.

==== Traktor Chelyabinsk ====
Left off the Maple Leafs return to play training camp roster, Åberg effectively left the NHL by signing a one-year contract with the Russian club, Traktor Chelyabinsk of the Kontinental Hockey League (KHL) on 13 July 2020. On 25 August 2020, Åberg's NHL rights were included in a six player trade by the Maple Leafs to the Pittsburgh Penguins, along with Kasperi Kapanen and Jesper Lindgren, in exchange for Evan Rodrigues, David Warsofsky, Filip Hållander and the 15th overall pick in the 2020 NHL entry draft. Åberg continued in the KHL for the duration of the 2020–21 season, where in 49 games he had 10 goals and 23 points for Traktor.

==== Ottawa Senators ====
After his lone season in Russia, Åberg returned to the NHL as a free agent, securing a one-year, two-way contract with the Canadian club, the Ottawa Senators, on 29 July 2021. After attending the Senators 2021 training camp, Åberg failed to make the opening night roster and was re-assigned to AHL affiliate, the Belleville Senators, to begin the 2021–22 season.

Åberg collected 2 goals and 9 assists for 11 points through 17 games with Belleville. Unable to earn a recall to Ottawa, on 6 December 2021, he was placed on unconditional waivers to mutually terminate the remainder of his contract with the Senators.

==== Return to Europe ====
Åberg as a free agent from the Senators immediately opted to return to his native Sweden, signing for the remainder of the season with Timrå IK of the SHL on 7 December 2021.

After helping the club avoid relegation, Åberg left Timrå in the off-season and initially joined the Czech club, BK Mladá Boleslav of the Czech Extraliga (ELH) on 15 June 2022. In the following 2022–23 season, Åberg registered 3 goals and 13 points through 26 games before opting to conclude his contract to continue his journeyman career, in joining Swiss club, SC Rapperswil-Jona Lakers of the National League (NL), for the remainder of the season on 10 December 2022.

Åberg having left Switzerland after his contract, opted to return to the KHL, by agreeing to a one-year contract with Kazakh-based club, Barys Astana for the 2023–24 season on 1 July 2023.

After a lone season with Barys, Åberg returned for a second tenure with his previous club, SC Rapperswil-Jona Lakers, in agreeing to an option two-year contract on 15 July 2024.

On 21 January 2025, Åberg agreed to be released from his contract with the Lakers, as the team's excess of import players meant that he had trouble getting into the lineup. He was immediately signed by rival National League club EHC Kloten.

== Career statistics ==
=== Regular season and playoffs ===
			Regular season					Playoffs
Season	Team	League	GP	G	A	Pts	PIM	GP	G	A	Pts	PIM
2008–09	Djurgårdens IF	J18	16	5	3	8	4	—	—	—	—	—
2008–09	Djurgårdens IF	J18 Allsv	11	1	0	1	4	—	—	—	—	—
2009–10	Djurgårdens IF	J18	22	22	17	39	16	—	—	—	—	—
2009–10	Djurgårdens IF	J18 Allsv	14	7	16	23	8	5	4	7	11	4
2009–10	Djurgårdens IF	J20	11	0	1	1	4	—	—	—	—	—
2010–11	Djurgårdens IF	J18	5	8	6	14	2	—	—	—	—	—
2010–11	Djurgårdens IF	J18 Allsv	3	3	1	4	25	3	0	2	2	2
2010–11	Djurgårdens IF	J20	41	13	17	30	16	4	2	3	5	2
2010–11	Djurgårdens IF	SEL	1	0	0	0	0	—	—	—	—	—
2011–12	Djurgårdens IF	SEL	47	8	7	15	6	—	—	—	—	—
2012–13	Djurgårdens IF	Allsv	52	12	28	40	6	6	3	1	4	2
2013–14	Färjestad BK	SHL	52	15	16	31	41	13	2	2	4	4
2014–15	Milwaukee Admirals	AHL	69	16	18	34	28	—	—	—	—	—
2015–16	Milwaukee Admirals	AHL	74	25	15	40	32	3	0	0	0	0
2015–16	Nashville Predators	NHL	—	—	—	—	—	2	0	0	0	0
2016–17	Milwaukee Admirals	AHL	56	31	21	52	40	—	—	—	—	—
2016–17	Nashville Predators	NHL	15	1	1	2	4	16	2	3	5	2
2017–18	Nashville Predators	NHL	37	2	6	8	8	—	—	—	—	—
2017–18	Milwaukee Admirals	AHL	4	4	2	6	16	—	—	—	—	—
2017–18	Edmonton Oilers	NHL	16	2	6	8	2	—	—	—	—	—
2018–19	Anaheim Ducks	NHL	37	11	8	19	14	—	—	—	—	—
2018–19	San Diego Gulls	AHL	2	1	1	2	4	—	—	—	—	—
2018–19	Minnesota Wild	NHL	22	1	5	6	6	—	—	—	—	—
2019–20	Toronto Marlies	AHL	55	20	24	44	36	—	—	—	—	—
2019–20	Toronto Maple Leafs	NHL	5	0	1	1	0	—	—	—	—	—
2020–21	Traktor Chelyabinsk	KHL	49	10	13	23	34	5	0	0	0	2
2021–22	Belleville Senators	AHL	17	2	9	11	6	—	—	—	—	—
2021–22	Timrå IK	SHL	24	5	6	11	36	—	—	—	—	—
2022–23	BK Mladá Boleslav	ELH	26	3	10	13	16	—	—	—	—	—
2022–23	SC Rapperswil-Jona Lakers	NL	22	10	12	22	2	6	1	0	1	2
2023–24	Barys Astana	KHL	64	17	20	37	24	—	—	—	—	—
SHL totals			124	28	29	57	83	13	2	2	4	4
NHL totals			132	17	27	44	34	18	2	3	5	2
KHL totals			113	27	33	60	58	5	0	0	0	2

=== International ===
Year	Team	Event	Result	GP	G	A	Pts	PIM
2010	Sweden	U17	3rd place, bronze medalist(s)	6	2	0	2	4
2010	Sweden	IH18	3rd place, bronze medalist(s)	5	5	2	7	—
Junior totals				11	7	2	9	4
