= Filip Hållander =

Swedish ice hockey player (born 2000)

- Born: 29 June 2000 (age 26) Sundsvall, Sweden
- Height: 6 ft 2 in (188 cm)
- Weight: 207 lb (94 kg; 14 st 11 lb)
- Position: Centre
- Shoots: Left
- NHL team Former teams: Edmonton Oilers; Timrå IK; Luleå HF; Pittsburgh Penguins
- National team: Sweden
- NHL draft: 58th overall, 2018; Pittsburgh Penguins
- Playing career: 2016–present

Filip Hållander (born 29 June 2000) is a Swedish professional ice hockey player who is a centre for the Edmonton Oilers of the National Hockey League (NHL).

== Playing career ==
He was selected by the Pittsburgh Penguins with the 58th overall pick in the 2018 NHL entry draft. On 15 July 2018, Hållander signed a three-year entry-level contract with the Pittsburgh Penguins.

He was returned to continue his development with his original club, Timrå IK, after gaining promotion to the SHL. In the 2018–19 season, Hållander scored 7 goals and 14 assists as a rookie during his first SHL season and was the second-best point producer for Timrå in their qualifying games with 5 goals and 3 assists in 7 matches, in their relegation and return to the HockeyAllsvenskan.

On 29 April 2019, Hållander signed a two-year contract to remain on loan in the SHL from the Penguins with Luleå HF.

On 25 August 2020, Hållander was traded by the Penguins to the Toronto Maple Leafs along with Evan Rodrigues, David Warsofsky and the 15th overall pick in the 2020 NHL entry draft (Rodion Amirov) in exchange for Kasperi Kapanen, Jesper Lindgren and Pontus Åberg. After another season with Luleå, where he recorded a career-high 13 goals in 51 SHL games, his team was defeated in the first round of the SHL playoffs by Skellefteå AIK. That offseason, on July 17, 2021, Hållander was traded by the Maple Leafs back to Pittsburgh, along with a seventh-round pick, in exchange for Jared McCann. (Note: McCann was expected by both Pittsburgh and Toronto to be an expansion draft casualty to the arriving Seattle Kraken; the Penguins used him to re-acquire Hållander and allow another player to be selected from their roster, while the Maple Leafs (who did not have enough space for a protection slot under expansion draft rules) acquired McCann for the purpose of enticing the Kraken to select him over Alexander Kerfoot.)

As a pending restricted free agent with the Penguins, on 28 April 2023, Hållander opted to return to his original Swedish club by signing a five-year deal with Timrå IK, with the club having returned to the SHL in his absence.

Following two productive seasons with Timrå, Hållander enacted his NHL-out clause and was signed to a two-year contract in a return to North America for another stint with the Pittsburgh Penguins on 29 April 2025. He earned a spot on the opening night roster for the 2025–26 season. On 16 October 2025, he scored his first NHL goal, a shorthanded game-winner over the Los Angeles Kings. His season was brief; he scored three more assists for a total of four points in 13 games before he was sidelined for three months with a blood clotting issue on 7 November. Hållander attempted to return to the lineup in late February 2026, starting an AHL conditioning stint with the Wilkes-Barre/Scranton Penguins. However, after only a week, he suffered a medical setback, and was deemed out for the season.

Hållander was named to the opening night roster for the Penguins for the 2026–27 NHL season. In the team's opening game of the season, the Penguins defeated the Flyers 7–0, during which he scored a goal and two assists for his first three-point game. He played only one more game with the Penguins before being traded to the Edmonton Oilers in exchange for Spencer Stastney on 7 October.

== Career statistics ==
=== Regular season and playoffs ===
			Regular season					Playoffs
Season	Team	League	GP	G	A	Pts	PIM	GP	G	A	Pts	PIM
2015–16	Timrå IK	J20	3	1	1	2	0	—	—	—	—	—
2016–17	Timrå IK	J20	34	9	15	24	14	4	0	0	0	0
2016–17	Timrå IK	Allsv	8	0	0	0	0	3	0	1	1	0
2017–18	Timrå IK	J20	1	0	0	0	0	—	—	—	—	—
2017–18	Timrå IK	Allsv	40	9	11	20	4	9	1	1	2	2
2018–19	Timrå IK	SHL	45	7	14	21	4	—	—	—	—	—
2019–20	Luleå HF	SHL	27	5	9	14	2	—	—	—	—	—
2020–21	Luleå HF	SHL	51	13	11	24	12	7	2	1	3	4
2021–22	Wilkes-Barre/Scranton Penguins	AHL	61	14	14	28	22	6	1	3	4	0
2021–22	Pittsburgh Penguins	NHL	1	0	0	0	0	—	—	—	—	—
2022–23	Wilkes-Barre/Scranton Penguins	AHL	43	11	22	33	20	—	—	—	—	—
2022–23	Pittsburgh Penguins	NHL	2	0	0	0	0	—	—	—	—	—
2023–24	Timrå IK	SHL	51	14	22	36	18	2	1	1	2	0
2024–25	Timrå IK	SHL	51	26	27	53	18	6	0	0	0	2
2025–26	Pittsburgh Penguins	NHL	13	1	3	4	2	—	—	—	—	—
2025–26	Wilkes-Barre/Scranton Penguins	AHL	3	1	0	1	2	—	—	—	—	—
2026–27	Pittsburgh Penguins	NHL	2	1	2	3	0	—	—	—	—	—
SHL totals			225	65	83	148	54	15	3	2	5	6
NHL totals			18	2	5	7	2	—	—	—	—	—

=== International ===
Year	Team	Event	Result	GP	G	A	Pts	PIM
2016	Sweden	U17	1st place, gold medalist(s)	6	1	0	1	0
2017	Sweden	IH18	3rd place, bronze medalist(s)	5	3	0	3	2
2019	Sweden	WJC	5th	5	0	0	0	2
2021	Sweden	WC	9th	5	0	1	1	2
Junior totals				16	4	0	4	4
Senior totals				5	0	1	1	2
