= Jani Hakanpää =

Finnish ice hockey player (born 1992)

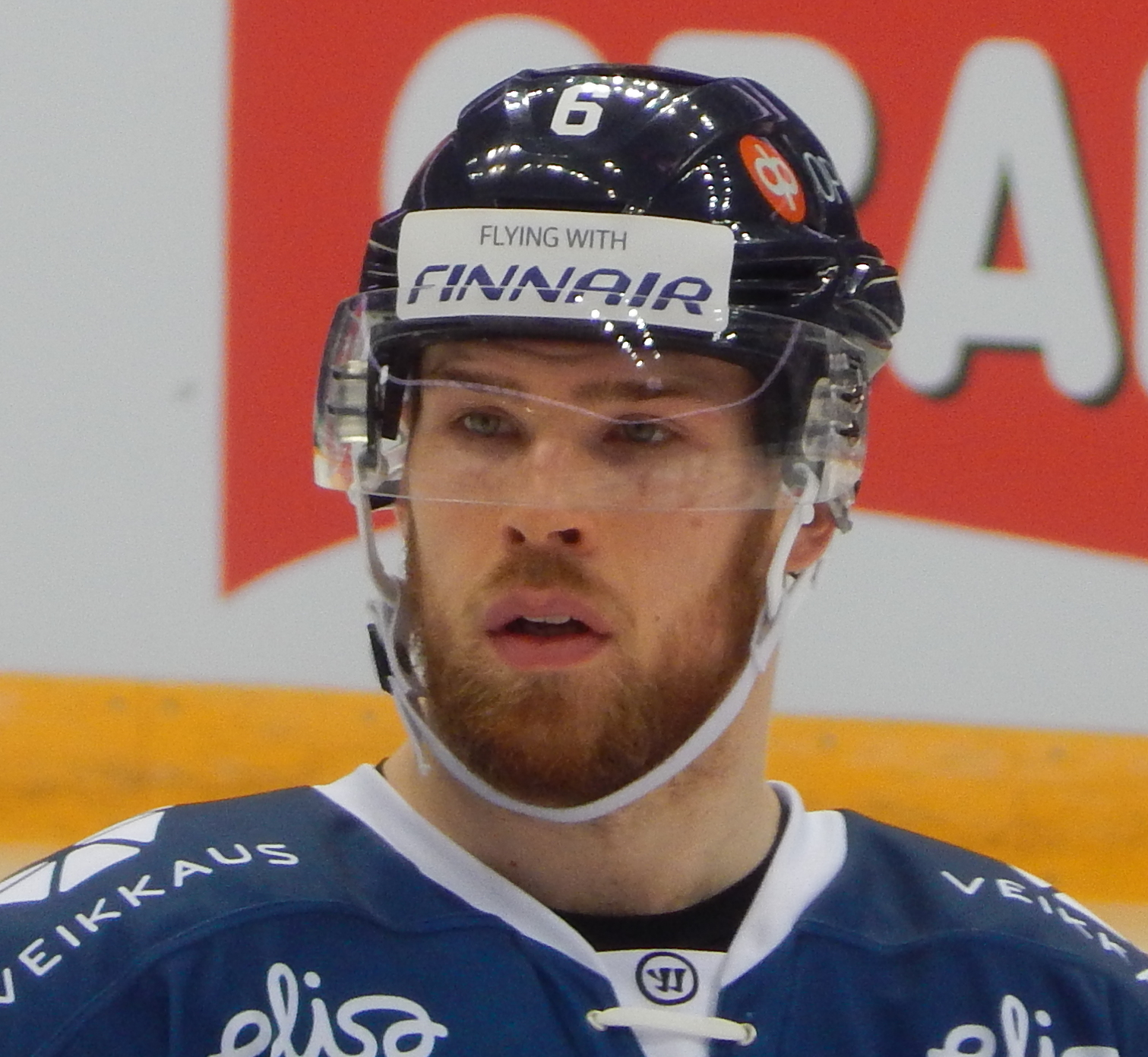
- Hakanpää with Finland in 2017
- Born: 31 March 1992 (age 34) Kirkkonummi, Finland
- Height: 6 ft 5 in (196 cm)
- Weight: 222 lb (101 kg; 15 st 12 lb)
- Position: Defence
- Shoots: Right
- Liiga team Former teams: Oulun Kärpät; Espoo Blues; Oulun Kärpät; Anaheim Ducks; Carolina Hurricanes; Dallas Stars; Toronto Maple Leafs
- National team: Finland
- NHL draft: 104th overall, 2010; St. Louis Blues
- Playing career: 2011–present

Jani Hakanpää (born 31 March 1992) is a Finnish professional ice hockey player who is a defenceman for Oulun Kärpät of the Finnish Liiga. Hakanpää was selected by the St. Louis Blues in the fourth round, 104th overall, of the 2010 NHL entry draft.

== Playing career ==
Hakanpää played in his native Finland for the Espoo Blues of the SM-liiga during the 2011–12 and 2012–13 seasons.

On 22 May 2012, Hakanpää was signed to a three-year, entry-level contract with draft club, the St. Louis Blues, who had drafted him 104th overall in the 2010 NHL entry draft.

After attending the Blues training camp, Hakanpää was returned to the Espoo Blues on loan to begin the 2012–13 season. He contributed with 5 points through 34 games on the blueline in Finland before returning to North America to play out the 2012–13 season with the St. Louis Blues' AHL affiliate, the Peoria Rivermen. He registered one goal and three assists in fourteen games.

At the completion of his entry-level deal with the Blues, Hakanpää opted to return to Finland signing a two-year contract with the Liiga club Oulun Kärpät on 2 July 2015.

In the 2017–18 season, Hakanpää helped Oulun Kärpät claim the Kanada-malja as Finnish champions, enjoying a career season where he posted 6 goals and 24 points in 58 games. He continued to show a developing two-way game with 7 points in 16 playoff appearances.

Hakanpää led Liiga defensemen in Plus–minus in back-to-back seasons and tied for second among league defensemen with a career best 11 goals while compiling 23 points in 52 games for league leading Kärpät in the 2018–19 season. He featured in 17 playoff contests, registering 4 points as Oulun Kärpät failed to defend the Championship in the finals against HPK.

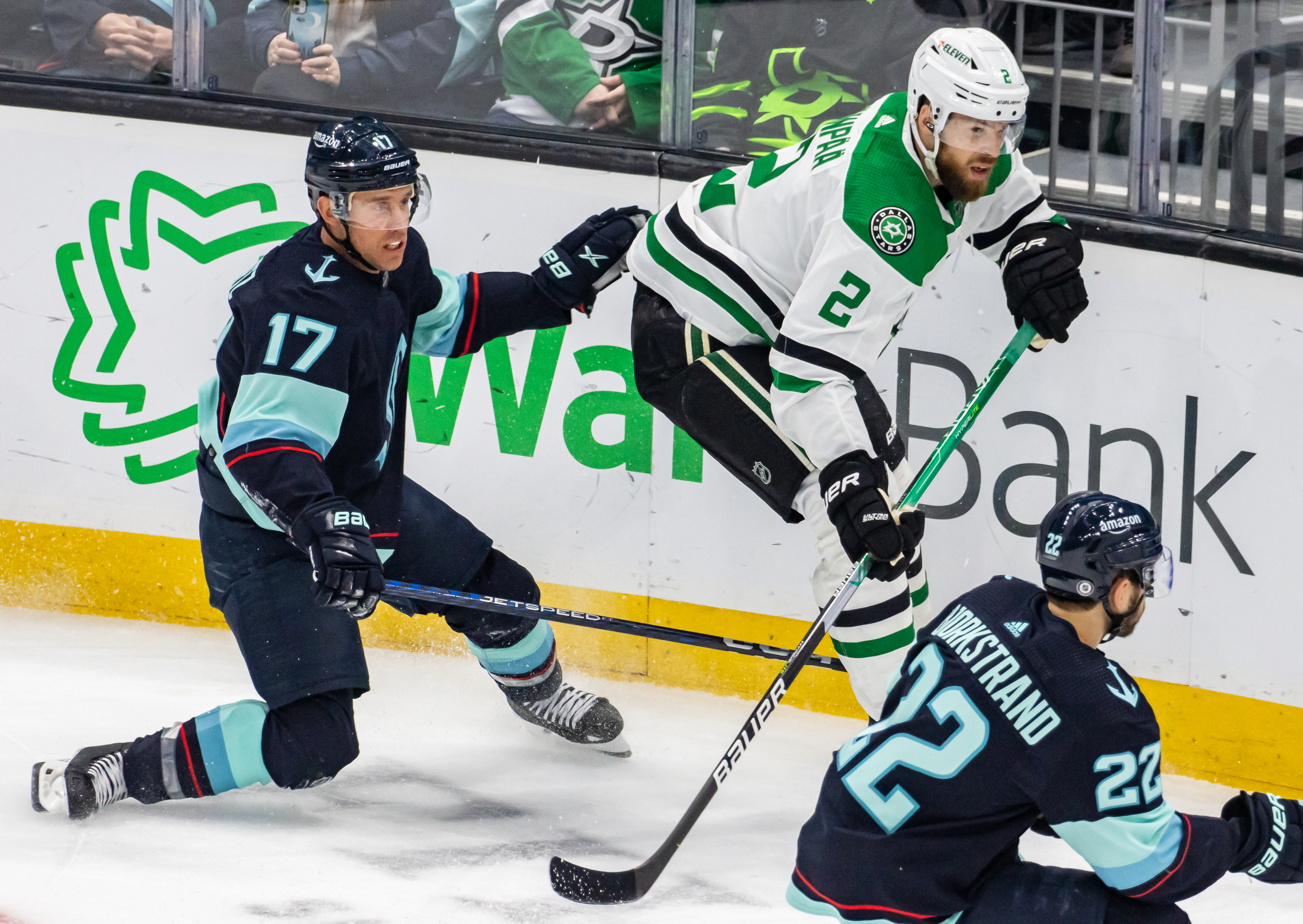
Hakanpää with the Dallas Stars in 2023.

On 3 July 2019, Hakanpää returned to North America, signing as a free agent to a one-year, $850,000 contract with the Anaheim Ducks.

In his first full season in the NHL, during the pandemic-delayed 2020–21 season, Hakanpää recorded one assist in 42 regular season games, while leading the Ducks and placing third in the league in hits. On 12 April 2021, Hakanpää, and a sixth-round pick in the 2022 NHL entry draft, was traded to the Carolina Hurricanes in exchange for Haydn Fleury.

On 29 July, Hakanpää signed a three-year, $4.5 million contract with the Dallas Stars. In the 2021–22 season, Hakanpää had his first multi-point game, and recorded four goals and eight assists for a 12-point season.

As a free agent following completion of his three-year tenure with the Stars, Hakanpää was reported to have signed a two-year, $3 million contract with the Toronto Maple Leafs on 2 July 2024. Although the Maple Leafs later acknowledged the addition to the roster, Hakanpää's agreement was delayed and revealed to be never formally signed due to ongoing knee injury concerns. The club officially signed him to a 1-year contract on 11 September 2024.

== Career statistics ==
=== Regular season and playoffs ===
| | | | Regular season | | | | | Playoffs |
| Season | Team | League | GP | G | A | Pts | PIM | GP | G | A | Pts | PIM |
|---|---|---|---|---|---|---|---|---|---|---|---|---|
| 2010–11 | Espoo Blues | Jr. A | 36 | 3 | 20 | 23 | 61 | 12 | 3 | 2 | 5 | 10 |
| 2011–12 | Espoo Blues | Jr. A | 5 | 0 | 4 | 4 | 0 | — | — | — | — | — |
| 2011–12 | Espoo Blues | SM-l | 41 | 5 | 7 | 12 | 30 | — | — | — | — | — |
| 2012–13 | Espoo Blues | SM-l | 34 | 2 | 3 | 5 | 34 | — | — | — | — | — |
| 2012–13 | Peoria Rivermen | AHL | 14 | 1 | 3 | 4 | 6 | — | — | — | — | — |
| 2013–14 | Chicago Wolves | AHL | 54 | 4 | 4 | 8 | 33 | 3 | 0 | 1 | 1 | 0 |
| 2014–15 | Chicago Wolves | AHL | 64 | 1 | 7 | 8 | 47 | 4 | 0 | 1 | 1 | 6 |
| 2014–15 | Quad City Mallards | ECHL | 2 | 1 | 0 | 1 | 0 | — | — | — | — | — |
| 2015–16 | Oulun Kärpät | Liiga | 60 | 1 | 11 | 12 | 40 | 14 | 1 | 5 | 6 | 8 |
| 2016–17 | Oulun Kärpät | Liiga | 53 | 0 | 5 | 5 | 61 | 2 | 0 | 1 | 1 | 2 |
| 2017–18 | Oulun Kärpät | Liiga | 58 | 6 | 18 | 24 | 44 | 16 | 3 | 4 | 7 | 18 |
| 2018–19 | Oulun Kärpät | Liiga | 52 | 11 | 12 | 23 | 94 | 17 | 1 | 3 | 4 | 6 |
| 2019–20 | San Diego Gulls | AHL | 47 | 1 | 12 | 13 | 24 | — | — | — | — | — |
| 2019–20 | Anaheim Ducks | NHL | 5 | 1 | 0 | 1 | 2 | — | — | — | — | — |
| 2020–21 | Anaheim Ducks | NHL | 42 | 0 | 1 | 1 | 31 | — | — | — | — | — |
| 2020–21 | Carolina Hurricanes | NHL | 15 | 2 | 1 | 3 | 4 | 11 | 0 | 0 | 0 | 4 |
| 2021–22 | Dallas Stars | NHL | 80 | 4 | 8 | 12 | 43 | 7 | 0 | 2 | 2 | 4 |
| 2022–23 | Dallas Stars | NHL | 82 | 6 | 10 | 16 | 60 | 15 | 1 | 1 | 2 | 16 |
| 2023–24 | Dallas Stars | NHL | 64 | 2 | 10 | 12 | 33 | — | — | — | — | — |
| 2024–25 | Toronto Marlies | AHL | 2 | 0 | 0 | 0 | 0 | — | — | — | — | — |
| 2024–25 | Toronto Maple Leafs | NHL | 2 | 0 | 0 | 0 | 0 | — | — | — | — | — |
| Liiga totals | | | 298 | 25 | 56 | 81 | 303 | 49 | 5 | 13 | 18 | 34 |
| NHL totals | | | 290 | 15 | 30 | 45 | 173 | 33 | 1 | 3 | 4 | 24 |

Medal record

Ice hockey

Representing Finland

World Championships
| Gold medal – first place | 2019 Slovakia | |

=== International ===
| Year | Team | Event | Result | GP | G | A | Pts | PIM |
|---|---|---|---|---|---|---|---|---|
| 2010 | Finland | U18 | 3rd place, bronze medalist(s) | 6 | 1 | 1 | 2 | 6 |
| 2012 | Finland | WJC | 4th | 7 | 1 | 2 | 3 | 6 |
| 2019 | Finland | WC | 1st place, gold medalist(s) | 10 | 1 | 1 | 2 | 4 |
| Junior totals | | | | 13 | 2 | 3 | 5 | 12 |
| Senior totals | | | | 10 | 1 | 1 | 2 | 4 |

== Awards and honours ==
| Award | Year | Ref |
Liiga
| Best P Plus–minus | 2018, 2019 | |
| Kanada-malja champion | 2018 | |
