= Jesper Lindgren =

Swedish ice hockey player (born 1997)

- Born: 19 May 1997 (age 29) Umeå, Sweden
- Height: 6 ft 0 in (183 cm)
- Weight: 176 lb (80 kg; 12 st 8 lb)
- Position: Defence
- Shoots: Right
- ICEHL team Former teams: Ferencvárosi TC; Modo Hockey; HPK
- NHL draft: 95th overall, 2015; Toronto Maple Leafs
- Playing career: 2015–present

Jesper Lindgren (born 19 May 1997) is a Swedish professional ice hockey defenceman who currently plays for Ferencvárosi TC in the ICE Hockey League (ICEHL).

== Playing career ==
Lindgren began his youth hockey career with IF Björklöven before moving to Modo Hockey at the age of 18 on May 7, 2013. He went on to make his Swedish Hockey League debut with Modo Hockey during the 2014–15 SHL season. In the 2015 NHL entry draft, Lindgren was selected 95th overall by the Toronto Maple Leafs.

On March 14, 2018, after finishing his rookie 2017–18 Liiga season with HPK, Lindgren accepted an amateur tryout contract with the Toronto Marlies, the AHL affiliate of the Maple Leafs. He played in four regular-season games for the Marlies before being released from the team during their playoff run on May 1, 2018. Shortly afterward, on May 18, 2018, Lindgren signed a three-year entry-level contract with the Toronto Maple Leafs.

On 17 September 2018, after taking part in the Maple Leafs' training camp and preseason preparations, Lindgren was reassigned on loan to HPK of the Finnish Liiga for further development and playing time during the 2018–19 season.

On August 9, 2020, Lindgren was loaned back to Modo Hockey of the Allsvenskan by the Maple Leafs to start the 2020–21 season. Later that month, on August 25, 2020, he was part of a six-player trade, in which the Maple Leafs sent Lindgren, Kasperi Kapanen, and Pontus Åberg to the Pittsburgh Penguins in exchange for Evan Rodrigues, David Warsofsky, Filip Hållander, and the 15th overall selection in the 2020 NHL entry draft.

== Career statistics ==
=== Regular season and playoffs ===
			Regular season					Playoffs
Season	Team	League	GP	G	A	Pts	PIM	GP	G	A	Pts	PIM
2013–14	Modo Hockey	J20	8	1	3	4	2	—	—	—	—	—
2014–15	Modo Hockey	J20	39	6	27	33	39	4	0	1	1	2
2014–15	Modo Hockey	SHL	4	0	1	1	0	—	—	—	—	—
2015–16	Modo Hockey	J20	20	4	10	14	22	2	0	0	0	0
2015–16	Modo Hockey	SHL	26	2	1	3	4	—	—	—	—	—
2015–16	IF Björklöven	Allsv	4	0	2	2	0	—	—	—	—	—
2016–17	Modo Hockey	J20	7	1	9	10	6	6	1	3	4	2
2016–17	Modo Hockey	Allsv	50	3	21	24	12	—	—	—	—	—
2017–18	HPK	Liiga	43	2	6	8	8	—	—	—	—	—
2017–18	Toronto Marlies	AHL	4	0	1	1	0	—	—	—	—	—
2018–19	HPK	Liiga	45	2	17	19	10	16	1	3	4	2
2018–19	Toronto Marlies	AHL	—	—	—	—	—	4	0	2	2	0
2019–20	Toronto Marlies	AHL	31	1	8	9	10	—	—	—	—	—
2020–21	Modo Hockey	Allsv	25	1	17	18	2	—	—	—	—	—
2021–22	IF Björklöven	Allsv	52	10	27	37	18	14	1	8	9	8
2022–23	IF Björklöven	Allsv	7	0	3	3	2	—	—	—	—	—
2023–24	IF Björklöven	Allsv	36	2	13	15	12	5	0	3	3	4
2024–25	IF Björklöven	Allsv	48	5	16	21	20	5	1	2	3	6
SHL totals			30	2	2	4	4	—	—	—	—	—
Liiga totals			88	4	23	27	18	16	1	3	4	2

=== International ===
Year	Team	Event	Result	GP	G	A	Pts	PIM
2015	Sweden	U18	8th	5	1	1	2	0
Junior totals				5	1	1	2	0

== Awards and honours ==
Award	Year
Liiga
Champion (HPK)	2019
