= Otto Paajanen =

Finnish ice hockey player

- Born: September 13, 1992 (age 32); Loppi, Finland
- Height: 5 ft 9 in (175 cm)
- Weight: 174 lb (79 kg; 12 st 6 lb)
- Position: Centre
- Shoots: Left
- Liiga team Former teams: KooKoo; HPK; Leksands IF; HIFK
- Playing career: 2011–present

Otto Paajanen (born September 13, 1992) is a Finnish professional ice hockey player. He is currently playing for KooKoo of the Liiga.

Paajanen made his Liiga debut playing with HPK during the 2011–12 Liiga season. Paajanen has represented Finland at U20 level.
