= List of Vegas Golden Knights award winners =

Vegas Golden Knights awards
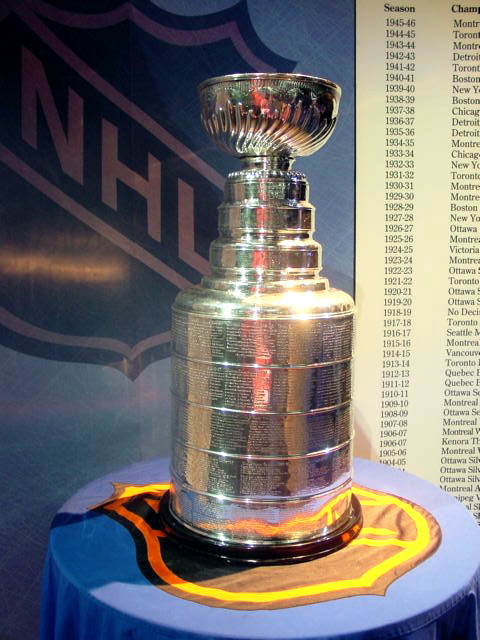
- The Vegas Golden Knights have won the Stanley Cup (above) one time.

Team trophies
- Award*: Wins
- Stanley Cup: 1
- Clarence S. Campbell Bowl: 3

Individual awards
- Award*: Wins
- Conn Smythe Trophy: 1
- General Manager of the Year Award: 1
- Jack Adams Award: 1
- Lady Byng Memorial Trophy: 1
- Mark Messier Leadership Award: 1
- Vezina Trophy: 1
- William M. Jennings Trophy: 1

Total
- Awards won: 11

This is a list of Vegas Golden Knights award winners.

== League awards ==
=== Team trophies ===
Team trophies awarded to the Vegas Golden Knights
Award	Description	Times won	Seasons	References
Stanley Cup	NHL championship	1	2022–23	
Clarence S. Campbell Bowl	Western Conference playoff championship	3	2017–18, 2022–23, 2025–26	

=== Individual awards ===
Individual awards won by Vegas Golden Knights players and staff
Award	Description	Winner	Season	References
Conn Smythe Trophy	Most valuable player of the playoffs	Jonathan Marchessault	2022–23	
General Manager of the Year Award	Top General Manager	George McPhee	2017–18	
Jack Adams Award	National Hockey League coach "adjudged to have contributed the most to his team's success."	Gerard Gallant	2017–18	
Lady Byng Memorial Trophy	Gentlemanly conduct	William Karlsson	2017–18	
Mark Messier Leadership Award	Leadership and contributions to society	Deryk Engelland	2017–18	
Vezina Trophy	Top goaltender	Marc-Andre Fleury	2020–21	
William M. Jennings Trophy	Fewest goals given up in the regular season (1981–present)	Marc-Andre Fleury	2020–21	
William M. Jennings Trophy	Fewest goals given up in the regular season (1981–present)	Robin Lehner	2020–21	

== All-Stars ==
=== NHL first and second team All-Stars ===
The NHL first and second team All-Stars are the top players at each position as voted on by the Professional Hockey Writers' Association.

Vegas Golden Knights players selected to the NHL First and Second Team All-Stars
Player	Position	Selections	Season	Team	References
Marc-Andre Fleury	Goaltender	1	2020–21	2nd	

=== All-Star Game selections ===
The National Hockey League All-Star Game is a mid-season exhibition game held annually between many of the top players of each season. Five All-Star Games has been held since the Vegas Golden Knights entered the league in 2017, with at least one player chosen to represent the franchise in each year. The All-Star game has not been held in various years: 1979 and 1987 due to the 1979 Challenge Cup and Rendez-vous '87 series between the NHL and the Soviet national team, respectively, 1995, 2005, and 2013 as a result of labor stoppages, 2006, 2010, 2014 and 2026 because of the Winter Olympic Games, 2021 as a result of the COVID-19 pandemic, and 2025 when it was replaced by the 2025 4 Nations Face-Off.

Vegas Golden Knights players and coaches selected to the All-Star Game
Game	Year	Name	Position	References
63rd	2018	Marc-Andre Fleury	Goaltender	
63rd	2018	Gerard Gallant	Coach	
63rd	2018	James Neal	Right wing	
64th	2019	Marc-Andre Fleury	Goaltender	
65th	2020	Marc-Andre Fleury (Did not play)	Goaltender	
65th	2020	Max Pacioretty (Replaced Jakob Silfverberg)	Left wing	
66th	2022	Peter DeBoer	Coach	
66th	2022	Jonathan Marchessault	Center	
66th	2022	Alex Pietrangelo	Defense	
66th	2022	Mark Stone	Right wing	
67th	2023	Bruce Cassidy	Coach	
67th	2023	Chandler Stephenson (Replaced Matty Beniers)	Center	
67th	2023	Logan Thompson	Goaltender	
68th	2024	Jack Eichel (Did not play)	Center	

=== Quarter-Century team ===
During the 2024–25 NHL season, the NHL named a Quarter-Century team for each franchise, to honor their best performers over the first 25 years of the 21st century. The teams were selected by members of the media, retired players, and executives of that franchise.

Position	First Team		Second Team	
Position	Player	Tenure	Player	Tenure
F	Jack Eichel	2022–present	Jonathan Marchessault	2017–2024
F	William Karlsson	2017–present	Reilly Smith	2017–2023; 2025–present
F	Mark Stone	2019–present	Chandler Stephenson	2019–2024
D	Alex Pietrangelo	2021–2025	Alec Martinez	2020–2024
D	Shea Theodore	2017–present	Brayden McNabb	2017–present
G	Adin Hill	2022–present	Marc-Andre Fleury	2017–2021

== National team selections ==
=== Olympic selections ===
Beginning with the 2026 Winter Olympics, NHL players returned to the Winter Olympics, after previously opting out in 2018 and 2022. As a result, this marked the first time in Vegas' history as a franchise that NHL players would participate at the Games. Eight Golden Knights, as well as head coach Bruce Cassidy, were initially selected to represent their home nations in the 2026 tournament; however, forward Jonas Rondbjerg missed the tournament due to injury. Additionally, Vegas acquired Rasmus Andersson, previously selected for Sweden, after rosters were announced but prior to the Olympics.

Vegas Golden Knights players and coaches selected to Olympic rosters
Olympics	Nation	Name	Position	References
2026 Milano Cortina	Canada	Bruce Cassidy	Assistant coach	
2026 Milano Cortina	Canada	Mitch Marner	Right wing	
2026 Milano Cortina	Canada	Mark Stone	Right wing	
2026 Milano Cortina	Canada	Shea Theodore	Defense	
2026 Milano Cortina	Czechia	Tomas Hertl	Center	
2026 Milano Cortina	Denmark	Jonas Rondbjerg (Did not play)	Right wing	
2026 Milano Cortina	Sweden	Rasmus Andersson	Defense	
2026 Milano Cortina	Switzerland	Akira Schmid	Goaltender	
2026 Milano Cortina	United States	Jack Eichel	Center	
2026 Milano Cortina	United States	Noah Hanifin	Defense	

=== 4 Nations Face-Off selections ===
In 2025, the NHL held the 4 Nations Face-Off in place of the All-Star Game. Seven Golden Knights, as well as head coach Bruce Cassidy, were selected to represent their home nations in the tournament; however, defenseman Alex Pietrangelo ultimately withdrew from Canada's roster prior to the tournament, while forward William Karlsson missed the tournament due to injury.

Vegas Golden Knights players and coaches selected to the 4 Nations Face-Off
Nation	Name	Position	References
Canada	Bruce Cassidy	Assistant coach	
Canada	Adin Hill	Goaltender	
Canada	Alex Pietrangelo (Did not play)	Defense	
Canada	Mark Stone	Right wing	
Canada	Shea Theodore	Defense	
Sweden	William Karlsson (Did not play)	Center	
United States	Jack Eichel	Center	
United States	Noah Hanifin	Defense	

== Career achievements ==
=== Hockey Hall of Fame ===
The Vegas Golden Knights have not had any players or personnel who have been enshrined in the Hockey Hall of Fame.

=== Retired numbers ===
The Vegas Golden Knights have retired one of their jersey numbers. The number 58 was retired by the team on March 31, 2018, in honor of the 58 victims killed in the 2017 Las Vegas shooting. Also out of circulation is the number 99 which was retired league-wide for Wayne Gretzky on February 6, 2000.

== Team awards ==
=== First Star Award ===
The First Star Award is an annual award which is given to the player who won the most votes in three star voting for home games throughout the regular season.

Season	Winner	Ref
2017–18	William Karlsson	
2018–19	Cody Eakin	
2018–19	Marc-Andre Fleury	
2019–20	Reilly Smith	
2020–21	Max Pacioretty	
2021–22	Evgenii Dadonov	
2022–23	Jack Eichel	
2023–24	Jack Eichel	
2024–25	Adin Hill	

=== Seventh Player Award ===
The Seventh Player Award is an annual award which is given to the player "whose performance on the ice most exceeded fan expectations" as determined by Golden Knights fans.

Season	Winner	Ref
2017–18	William Karlsson	
2018–19	Ryan Reaves	
2019–20	Chandler Stephenson	
2020–21	Alec Martinez	
2021–22	Nicolas Roy	
2022–23	William Carrier	
2023–24	Brayden McNabb	
2024–25	Brett Howden	

=== Vegas Strong Service Award ===
The Vegas Strong Service Award is an annual award which is given to the player "most involved in serving and giving back to the Las Vegas community" as selected by Vegas Golden Knights staff.

Season	Winner	Ref
2017–18	Deryk Engelland	
2018–19	Deryk Engelland	
2019–20	Max Pacioretty	
2019–20	Paul Stastny	
2020–21	Shea Theodore	
2021–22	Mark Stone	
2022–23	Reilly Smith	
2023–24	Jack Eichel	
2024–25	Keegan Kolesar	

== Other awards ==
Vegas Golden Knights who have received non-NHL awards
Award	Description	Winner	Season	References
Guldpucken	Best Swedish ice hockey player	William Karlsson	2017–18	
Viking Award	Most valuable Swedish NHL player, as voted by Swedish NHL players	William Karlsson	2017–18	

== See also ==
- List of National Hockey League awards
