= 2019–20 Vegas Golden Knights season =

Professional ice hockey team season

2019–20 Vegas Golden Knights
- Pacific Division champions
- Division: 1st Pacific
- Conference: 3rd Western
- 2019–20 record: 39–24–8
- Home record: 22–11–4
- Road record: 17–13–4
- Goals for: 227
- Goals against: 211

Team information
- General manager: Kelly McCrimmon
- Coach: Gerard Gallant (Oct. 2 – Jan. 15); Peter DeBoer (Jan. 15 – Sep. 14)
- Captain: Vacant
- Alternate captains: Deryk Engelland; Max Pacioretty; Reilly Smith; Mark Stone
- Arena: T-Mobile Arena
- Average attendance: 18,310
- Minor league affiliates: Chicago Wolves (AHL); Fort Wayne Komets (ECHL)

Team leaders
- Goals: Max Pacioretty (32)
- Assists: Mark Stone (42)
- Points: Max Pacioretty (66)
- Penalty minutes: Ryan Reaves (47)
- Plus/minus: Chandler Stephenson (+19)
- Wins: Marc-Andre Fleury (27)
- Goals against average: Robin Lehner (1.67)

The 2019–20 Vegas Golden Knights season was the third season for the National Hockey League (NHL) franchise that started playing in the 2017–18 season. They played their home games at T-Mobile Arena on the Las Vegas Strip in Paradise, Nevada. They made the playoffs for the third straight season after losing in the first round of the 2019 Stanley Cup playoffs to the San Jose Sharks the year prior. On October 17, 2019, the NHL suspended Valentin Zykov for 20 regular season games for violating the terms of the NHL/NHLPA Performance Enhancing Substances Program.

The season was suspended by the league officials on March 12, 2020, after several other professional and collegiate sports organizations followed suit as a result of the ongoing COVID-19 pandemic. On May 26, the NHL regular season was officially declared over with the remaining games being cancelled. The Golden Knights advanced to the playoffs and earned the top seed in the Western Conference during the Stanley Cup Qualifiers. In the First Round they defeated the Chicago Blackhawks in five games. The Golden Knights advanced to their second Conference Final in three years after defeating the Vancouver Canucks in seven games in the Second Round. The Golden Knights season came to an end in the fifth game of the Conference Finals as they fell to the Dallas Stars.

== Regular season ==
The Golden Knights started their season with a 4–1 win against the San Jose Sharks on October 3. Cody Glass scored his first NHL goal in his debut game during the opener.

== Standings ==
=== Divisional standings ===
Pacific Division
Pos	Team	GP	W	L	OTL	RW	GF	GA	GD	Pts
1	Vegas Golden Knights	71	39	24	8	30	227	211	+16	86
2	Edmonton Oilers	71	37	25	9	31	225	217	+8	83
3	Calgary Flames	70	36	27	7	25	210	215	−5	79
4	Vancouver Canucks	69	36	27	6	27	228	217	+11	78
5	Arizona Coyotes	70	33	29	8	26	195	187	+8	74
6	Anaheim Ducks	71	29	33	9	20	187	226	−39	67
7	Los Angeles Kings	70	29	35	6	21	178	212	−34	64
8	San Jose Sharks	70	29	36	5	22	182	226	−44	63

Source: National Hockey League

=== Western Conference ===
Pos	Team	GP	W	L	OTL	RW	GF	GA	GD	PCT	Qualification
1	St. Louis Blues	71	42	19	10	33	225	193	+32	.662	Advance to Seeding round-robin tournament
2	Colorado Avalanche	70	42	20	8	37	237	191	+46	.657	Advance to Seeding round-robin tournament
3	Vegas Golden Knights	71	39	24	8	30	227	211	+16	.606	Advance to Seeding round-robin tournament
4	Dallas Stars	69	37	24	8	26	180	177	+3	.594	Advance to Seeding round-robin tournament
5	Edmonton Oilers	71	37	25	9	31	225	217	+8	.585	Advance to 2020 Stanley Cup playoffs qualifying round
6	Nashville Predators	69	35	26	8	28	215	217	−2	.565	Advance to 2020 Stanley Cup playoffs qualifying round
7	Vancouver Canucks	69	36	27	6	27	228	217	+11	.565	Advance to 2020 Stanley Cup playoffs qualifying round
8	Calgary Flames	70	36	27	7	25	210	215	−5	.564	Advance to 2020 Stanley Cup playoffs qualifying round
9	Winnipeg Jets	71	37	28	6	30	216	203	+13	.563	Advance to 2020 Stanley Cup playoffs qualifying round
10	Minnesota Wild	69	35	27	7	30	220	220	0	.558	Advance to 2020 Stanley Cup playoffs qualifying round
11	Arizona Coyotes	70	33	29	8	26	195	187	+8	.529	Advance to 2020 Stanley Cup playoffs qualifying round
12	Chicago Blackhawks	70	32	30	8	23	212	218	−6	.514	Advance to 2020 Stanley Cup playoffs qualifying round
13	Anaheim Ducks	71	29	33	9	20	187	226	−39	.472	
14	Los Angeles Kings	70	29	35	6	21	178	212	−34	.457	
15	San Jose Sharks	70	29	36	5	22	182	226	−44	.450	

Source: National Hockey League

Tiebreaking procedures

1. Fewer number of games played (only used during regular season).
2. Greater number of regulation wins (denoted by RW).
3. Greater number of wins in regulation and overtime (excluding shootout wins; denoted by ROW).
4. Greater number of total wins (including shootouts).
5. Greater number of points earned in head-to-head play; if teams played an uneven number of head-to-head games, the result of the first game on the home ice of the team with the extra home game is discarded.
6. Greater goal differential (difference between goals for and goals against).
7. Greater number of goals scored (denoted by GF).

== Schedule and results ==
=== Preseason ===
The preseason schedule was published on June 18, 2019.

2019 preseason game log: 5–2–0 (Home: 2–2–0; Road: 3–0–0)
#	Date	Visitor	Score	Home	OT	Decision	Attendance	Record	Recap
1	September 15	Arizona	2–6	Vegas		Subban	17,767	1–0–0
2	September 17	Vegas	5–0	Colorado		Sparks	—	2–0–0
3	September 19	Vegas	3–2	Los Angeles	OT	Dansk	10,421	3–0–0
4	September 21	Vegas	3–1	San Jose		Fleury	15,052	4–0–0
5	September 25	Colorado	4–1	Vegas		Subban	17,954	4–1–0
6	September 27	Los Angeles	3–2	Vegas		Fleury	18,103	4–2–0
7	September 29	San Jose	1–5	Vegas		Fleury	18,131	5–2–0

=== Regular season ===
The regular season schedule was published on June 25, 2019.

2019–20 game log

October: 8–5–1 (Home: 4–3–1; Road: 4–2–0)
#	Date	Visitor	Score	Home	OT	Decision	Attendance	Record	Pts	Recap
1	October 2	San Jose	1–4	Vegas		Fleury	18,588	1–0–0	2
2	October 4	Vegas	5–1	San Jose		Fleury	17,562	2–0–0	4
3	October 8	Boston	4–3	Vegas		Fleury	18,223	2–1–0	4
4	October 10	Vegas	1–4	Arizona		Subban	13,864	2–2–0	4
5	October 12	Calgary	2–6	Vegas		Fleury	18,192	3–2–0	6
6	October 13	Vegas	5–2	Los Angeles		Fleury	17,699	4–2–0	8
7	October 15	Nashville	5–2	Vegas		Fleury	18,188	4–3–0	8
8	October 17	Ottawa	2–3	Vegas	SO	Fleury	18,171	5–3–0	10
9	October 19	Vegas	3–0	Pittsburgh		Fleury	18,610	6–3–0	12
10	October 21	Vegas	2–6	Philadelphia		Dansk	16,780	6–4–0	12
11	October 22	Vegas	2–1	Chicago	SO	Fleury	21,172	7–4–0	14
12	October 25	Colorado	6–1	Vegas		Fleury	18,420	7–5–0	14
13	October 27	Anaheim	2–5	Vegas		Fleury	18,110	8–5–0	16
14	October 31	Montreal	5–4	Vegas	OT	Fleury	18,035	8–5–1	17

November: 5–6–3 (Home: 3–2–2; Road: 2–4–1)
#	Date	Visitor	Score	Home	OT	Decision	Attendance	Record	Pts	Recap
15	November 2	Winnipeg	4–3	Vegas	OT	Subban	18,276	8–5–2	18
16	November 5	Vegas	2–1	Columbus		Fleury	15,435	9–5–2	20
17	November 7	Vegas	1–2	Toronto	OT	Subban	19,218	9–5–3	21
18	November 9	Vegas	2–5	Washington		Fleury	18,573	9–6–3	21
19	November 10	Vegas	2–3	Detroit		Subban	19,057	9–7–3	21
20	November 13	Chicago	5–3	Vegas		Fleury	18,324	9–8–3	21
21	November 16	Vegas	3–4	Los Angeles		Subban	17,282	9–9–3	21
22	November 17	Calgary	0–6	Vegas		Fleury	18,083	10–9–3	23
23	November 19	Toronto	2–4	Vegas		Fleury	18,292	11–9–3	25
24	November 21	San Jose	2–1	Vegas	OT	Fleury	18,275	11–9–4	26
25	November 23	Edmonton	4–2	Vegas		Fleury	18,319	11–10–4	26
26	November 25	Vegas	2–4	Dallas		Subban	18,532	11–11–4	26
27	November 27	Vegas	4–3	Nashville	OT	Subban	17,326	12–11–4	28
28	November 29	Arizona	1–2	Vegas	SO	Subban	18,326	13–11–4	30

December: 9–4–2 (Home: 5–2–0; Road: 4–2–2)
#	Date	Visitor	Score	Home	OT	Decision	Attendance	Record	Pts	Recap
29	December 2	Vegas	4–1	NY Rangers		Subban	16,325	14–11–4	32
30	December 3	Vegas	4–3	New Jersey		Subban	12,831	15–11–4	34
31	December 5	Vegas	2–3	NY Islanders	OT	Subban	13,117	15–11–5	35
32	December 8	NY Rangers	5–0	Vegas		Subban	18,236	15–12–5	35
33	December 10	Chicago	1–5	Vegas		Fleury	18,319	16–12–5	37
34	December 12	Vegas	2–4	St. Louis		Fleury	18,096	16–13–5	37
35	December 13	Vegas	3–2	Dallas	OT	Subban	18,532	17–13–5	39
36	December 15	Vancouver	3–6	Vegas		Fleury	18,066	18–13–5	41
37	December 17	Minnesota	2–3	Vegas		Fleury	18,220	19–13–5	43
38	December 19	Vegas	4–5	Vancouver	OT	Fleury	18,871	19–13–6	44
39	December 22	Vegas	3–1	San Jose		Subban	17,015	20–13–6	46
40	December 23	Colorado	7–3	Vegas		Fleury	18,425	20–14–6	46
41	December 27	Vegas	3–4	Anaheim		Subban	16,601	20–15–6	46
42	December 28	Arizona	1–4	Vegas		Fleury	18,461	21–15–6	48
43	December 31	Anaheim	2–5	Vegas		Fleury	18,320	22–15–6	50

January: 4–5–1 (Home: 2–3–0; Road: 2–2–1)
#	Date	Visitor	Score	Home	OT	Decision	Attendance	Record	Pts	Recap
44	January 2	Philadelphia	4–5	Vegas		Fleury	18,415	23–15–6	52
45	January 4	St. Louis	4–5	Vegas	OT	Fleury	18,334	24–15–6	54
46	January 7	Pittsburgh	4–3	Vegas		Fleury	18,298	24–16–6	54
47	January 9	Los Angeles	5–2	Vegas		Subban	18,281	24–17–6	54
48	January 11	Columbus	3–0	Vegas		Fleury	18,400	24–18–6	54
49	January 14	Vegas	2–4	Buffalo		Fleury	18,257	24–19–6	54
50	January 16	Vegas	4–2	Ottawa		Fleury	12,412	25–19–6	56
51	January 18	Vegas	4–5	Montreal	SO	Fleury	21,302	25–19–7	57
52	January 21	Vegas	2–3	Boston		Fleury	17,850	25–20–7	57
53	January 31	Vegas	4–3	Carolina		Subban	18,150	26–20–7	59

February: 10–2–1 (Home: 7–0–1; Road: 3–2–0)
#	Date	Visitor	Score	Home	OT	Decision	Attendance	Record	Pts	Recap
54	February 1	Vegas	3–0	Nashville		Fleury	17,664	27–20–7	61
55	February 4	Vegas	2–4	Tampa Bay		Fleury	19,092	27–21–7	61
56	February 6	Vegas	7–2	Florida		Fleury	15,057	28–21–7	63
57	February 8	Carolina	6–5	Vegas	SO	Fleury	18,417	28–21–8	64
58	February 11	Vegas	0–4	Minnesota		Fleury	17,112	28–22–8	64
59	February 13	St. Louis	5–6	Vegas	OT	Subban	18,252	29–22–8	66
60	February 15	NY Islanders	0–1	Vegas		Fleury	18,444	30–22–8	68
61	February 17	Washington	2–3	Vegas		Fleury	18,399	31–22–8	70
62	February 20	Tampa Bay	3–5	Vegas		Fleury	18,376	32–22–8	72
63	February 22	Florida	3–5	Vegas		Fleury	18,480	33–22–8	74
64	February 23	Vegas	6–5	Anaheim	OT	Subban	15,171	34–22–8	76
65	February 26	Edmonton	0–3	Vegas		Fleury	18,421	35–22–8	78
66	February 28	Buffalo	2–4	Vegas		Lehner	18,404	36–22–8	80

March: 3–2–0 (Home: 1–1–0; Road: 2–1–0)
#	Date	Visitor	Score	Home	OT	Decision	Attendance	Record	Pts	Recap
67	March 1	Los Angeles	4–1	Vegas		Fleury	18,419	36–23–8	80
68	March 3	New Jersey	0–3	Vegas		Lehner	18,290	37–23–8	82
69	March 6	Vegas	0–4	Winnipeg		Fleury	15,325	37–24–8	82
70	March 8	Vegas	5–3	Calgary		Lehner	18,841	38–24–8	84
71	March 9	Vegas	3–2	Edmonton	OT	Fleury	17,327	39–24–8	86

Cancelled games
#	Date	Visitor	Home
72	March 12	Vegas	Minnesota
73	March 15	Vegas	Colorado
74	March 17	Dallas	Vegas
75	March 18	Vegas	Arizona
76	March 21	Detroit	Vegas
77	March 23	Vancouver	Vegas
78	March 25	Arizona	Vegas
79	March 29	Vegas	Winnipeg
80	March 31	Vegas	Edmonton
81	April 2	Vegas	Calgary
82	April 4	Vegas	Vancouver

Legend: Win (2 points) Loss (0 points) Overtime/shootout loss (1 point)

=== Playoffs ===
The Golden Knights played in a round-robin tournament to determine their seed for the playoffs. Vegas finished with a 3–0–0 record to clinch the first seed for the playoffs.

In the first round, the Golden Knights defeated the Chicago Blackhawks in five games.

In the second round, the Golden Knights faced the Vancouver Canucks, and defeated them in seven games.

The Golden Knights faced the Dallas Stars in the Conference Final, but were defeated in five games.

2020 Stanley Cup playoffs

Western Conference Seeding Round-robin
#	Date	Visitor	Score	Home	OT	Decision	Record	Points	Recap
1	August 3	Dallas	3–5	Vegas		Lehner	1–0–0	2
2	August 6	Vegas	6–4	St. Louis		Fleury	2–0–0	4
3	August 8	Vegas	4–3	Colorado	OT	Lehner	3–0–0	6

Western Conference First Round vs. (8) Chicago Blackhawks: Vegas won 4–1
#	Date	Visitor	Score	Home	OT	Decision	Series	Recap
1	August 11	Chicago	1–4	Vegas		Lehner	1–0
2	August 13	Chicago	3–4	Vegas	OT	Lehner	2–0
3	August 15	Vegas	2–1	Chicago		Fleury	3–0
4	August 16	Vegas	1–3	Chicago		Lehner	3–1
5	August 18	Chicago	3–4	Vegas		Lehner	4–1

Western Conference Second Round vs. (5) Vancouver Canucks: Vegas won 4–3
#	Date	Visitor	Score	Home	OT	Decision	Series	Recap
1	August 23	Vancouver	0–5	Vegas		Lehner	1–0
2	August 25	Vancouver	5–2	Vegas		Lehner	1–1
3	August 29	Vegas	3–0	Vancouver		Lehner	2–1
4	August 30	Vegas	5–3	Vancouver		Fleury	3–1
5	September 1	Vancouver	2–1	Vegas		Lehner	3–2
6	September 3	Vegas	0–4	Vancouver		Lehner	3–3
7	September 4	Vancouver	0–3	Vegas		Lehner	4–3

Western Conference Finals vs. (3) Dallas Stars: Dallas won 4–1
#	Date	Visitor	Score	Home	OT	Decision	Series	Recap
1	September 6	Dallas	1–0	Vegas		Fleury	0–1
2	September 8	Dallas	0–3	Vegas		Lehner	1–1
3	September 10	Vegas	2–3	Dallas	OT	Lehner	1–2
4	September 12	Vegas	1–2	Dallas		Lehner	1–3
5	September 14	Dallas	3–2	Vegas	OT	Lehner	1–4

Legend: Win (2 points) Loss (0 points) Overtime/shootout loss (1 point)

== Player statistics ==
=== Skaters ===
Regular season
Player	GP	G	A	Pts	+/−	PIM
Max Pacioretty	71	32	34	66	18	44
Mark Stone	65	21	42	63	15	27
Reilly Smith	71	27	27	54	17	20
Jonathan Marchessault	66	22	25	47	6	28
William Karlsson	63	15	31	46	11	16
Shea Theodore	71	13	33	46	12	25
Paul Stastny	71	17	21	38	6	24
Nate Schmidt	59	7	24	31	11	12
Chandler Stephenson^{†}	41	8	14	22	19	10
William Carrier	71	7	12	19	0	39
Alex Tuch	42	8	9	17	−10	8
Ryan Reaves	71	8	7	15	−5	47
Tomas Nosek	67	8	7	15	−2	20
Nick Holden	61	6	8	14	−1	13
Cody Glass	39	5	7	12	−7	6
Nicolas Hague	38	1	10	11	0	32
Nicolas Roy	28	5	5	10	3	8
Cody Eakin^{‡}	41	4	6	10	−9	16
Brayden McNabb	71	2	7	9	1	40
Alec Martinez^{†}	10	2	6	8	5	6
Jon Merrill	49	2	5	7	9	32
Deryk Engelland	49	1	5	6	6	37
Valentin Zykov	15	1	3	4	−2	6
Nick Cousins^{†}	7	1	2	3	−1	2
Brandon Pirri	16	0	2	2	−4	8
Patrick Brown	1	1	0	1	0	0
Zach Whitecloud	16	0	1	1	3	4
Gage Quinney	3	0	1	1	−1	0
Keegan Kolesar	1	0	0	0	0	0
Jake Bischoff	4	0	0	0	−2	4

Playoffs
Player	GP	G	A	Pts	+/−	PIM
Shea Theodore	20	7	12	19	7	8
Mark Stone	20	7	10	17	−1	6
Reilly Smith	20	5	9	14	2	8
Alex Tuch	20	8	4	12	5	8
William Karlsson	20	4	6	10	2	0
Jonathan Marchessault	20	3	7	10	1	16
Paul Stastny	18	3	6	9	1	8
Nate Schmidt	20	2	7	9	0	4
Max Pacioretty	16	5	3	8	−2	12
Alec Martinez	20	2	6	8	11	4
Nicolas Roy	20	1	7	8	4	6
Chandler Stephenson	20	3	2	5	2	4
Nick Cousins	17	0	5	5	0	22
Ryan Reaves	19	0	4	4	2	14
William Carrier	20	2	1	3	3	10
Zach Whitecloud	20	2	1	3	1	6
Tomas Nosek	8	2	1	3	0	2
Brayden McNabb	20	0	3	3	−1	14
Patrick Brown	2	1	0	1	1	0
Jon Merrill	1	0	1	1	1	0
Nick Holden	19	0	1	1	2	4

=== Goaltenders ===
Regular season
Player	GP	GS	TOI	W	L	OT	GA	GAA	SA	SV%	SO	G	A	PIM
Marc-Andre Fleury	49	48	2,880:06	27	16	5	133	2.77	1,399	.905	5	0	0	8
Malcolm Subban^{‡}	20	19	1,133:05	9	7	3	60	3.18	546	.890	0	0	0	0
Robin Lehner^{†}	3	3	180:00	3	0	0	5	1.67	83	.940	1	0	0	0
Garret Sparks	1	0	27:24	0	0	0	2	4.38	14	.857	0	0	0	0
Oscar Dansk	1	1	60:00	0	1	0	6	6.00	37	.838	0	0	0	0

Playoffs
Player	GP	GS	TOI	W	L	GA	GAA	SA	SV%	SO	G	A	PIM
Robin Lehner	16	16	965:52	9	7	32	1.99	386	.917	4	0	0	0
Marc-Andre Fleury	4	4	238:02	3	1	9	2.27	100	.910	0	0	0	2

^{†}Denotes player spent time with another team before joining the Golden Knights. Stats reflect time with the Golden Knights only.
^{‡}Denotes player was traded mid-season. Stats reflect time with the Golden Knights only.
Bold/italics denotes franchise record.

== Transactions ==
The Golden Knights were involved in the following transactions during the 2019–20 season.

=== Trades ===
* Retained Salary Transaction: Each team is allowed up to three contracts on their payroll where they have retained salary in a trade (i.e. the player no longer plays with Team A due to a trade to Team B, but Team A still retains some salary). Only up to 50% of a player's contract can be kept, and only up to 15% of a team's salary cap can be taken up by retained salary. A contract can only be involved in one of these trades twice.

Date	Details		Ref
June 26, 2019	To Carolina Hurricanes Erik Haula	To Vegas Golden Knights Nicolas Roy conditional 5th-round pick in 2021	
June 28, 2019	To Buffalo Sabres Colin Miller	To Vegas Golden Knights STL 2nd-round pick in 2021; 5th-round pick in 2022	
June 22, 2019	To San Jose Sharks 2nd-round pick in 2019 (#48 overall); WPG 3rd-round pick in 2019 (#82 overall)	To Vegas Golden Knights PHI 2nd-round pick in 2019 (#41 overall)	
July 23, 2019	To Toronto Maple Leafs David Clarkson; 4th-round pick in 2020	To Vegas Golden Knights Garret Sparks	
July 29, 2019	To New Jersey Devils Nikita Gusev	To Vegas Golden Knights 3rd-round pick in 2020; 2nd-round pick in 2021	
December 2, 2019	To Washington Capitals 5th-round pick in 2021	To Vegas Golden Knights Chandler Stephenson	
February 19, 2020	To Los Angeles Kings 2nd-round pick in 2020; STL 2nd-round pick in 2021	To Vegas Golden Knights Alec Martinez	
February 21, 2020	To Winnipeg Jets Cody Eakin	To Vegas Golden Knights conditional 3rd-round pick in 2021 or 4th-round pick in 2021	
February 24, 2020	To Montreal Canadiens 4th-round pick in 2021	To Vegas Golden Knights Nick Cousins	
February 24, 2020	To Toronto Maple Leafs 5th-round pick in 2020	To Vegas Golden Knights Robin Lehner*	
February 24, 2020	To Chicago Blackhawks Malcolm Subban; Slava Demin; PIT 2nd-round pick in 2020	To Vegas Golden Knights Martins Dzierkals	
September 28, 2020	To Chicago Blackhawks Brandon Pirri	To Vegas Golden Knights Dylan Sikura	

=== Players acquired ===
Date	Player	Former team	Term	Via	Ref
July 1, 2019	Patrick Brown	Carolina Hurricanes	2-year	Free agency	
July 1, 2019	Tyrell Goulbourne	Philadelphia Flyers	2-year	Free agency	
July 1, 2019	Brett Lernout	Montreal Canadiens	1-year	Free agency	
July 1, 2019	Jaycob Megna	Anaheim Ducks	1-year	Free agency	
September 20, 2019	Brayden Pachal	Prince Albert Raiders (WHL)	3-year†	Free agency	
July 13, 2020	Logan Thompson	Hershey Bears (AHL)	2-year†‡	Free agency	
Legend: † Contract is entry-level. ‡ Contract begins in 2020–21 season.

=== Players lost ===
Date	Player	New team	Term	Via	Ref
June 21, 2019	Brooks Macek	Avtomobilist Yekaterinburg (KHL)	1-year	Free agency	
July 1, 2019	Pierre-Edouard Bellemare	Colorado Avalanche	2-year	Free agency	
July 1, 2019	Ryan Carpenter	Chicago Blackhawks	3-year	Free agency	
July 1, 2019	Daniel Carr	Nashville Predators	1-year	Free agency	
July 1, 2019	Maxime Lagace	Boston Bruins	1-year	Free agency	
July 1, 2019	Zachary Fucale	Syracuse Crunch (AHL)	1-year	Free agency	
July 2, 2019	T. J. Tynan	Colorado Avalanche	1-year	Free agency	
July 11, 2019	Alex Gallant	Stockton Heat (AHL)	1-year	Free agency	
July 11, 2019	Zac Leslie	Stockton Heat (AHL)	1-year	Free agency	
August 13, 2019	Philip Holm	Chicago Blackhawks	1-year	Free agency	
August 22, 2019	Stefan Matteau	Cleveland Monsters (AHL)	1-year	Free agency	

=== Signings ===
Date	Player	Term	Ref
June 24, 2019	William Karlsson	8-year	
July 1, 2019	Tomas Nosek	1-year	
July 1, 2019	Brandon Pirri	2-year	
July 9, 2019	Malcolm Subban	1-year	
July 16, 2019	Jake Bischoff	3-year	
July 23, 2019	Deryk Engelland	1-year	
July 31, 2019	Marcus Kallionkieli	3-year†	
September 5, 2019	Jimmy Schuldt	1-year	
November 16, 2019	Peyton Krebs	3-year†	
December 21, 2019	Kaedan Korczak	3-year†	
February 24, 2020	Nick Holden	2-year‡	
February 27, 2020	William Carrier	4-year‡	
March 22, 2020	Zach Whitecloud	2-year‡	
April 22, 2020	Nicolas Roy	2-year‡	
June 1, 2020	Connor Corcoran	3-year†‡	
June 11, 2020	Oscar Dansk	1-year‡	
June 15, 2020	Ryan Reaves	2-year‡	
June 30, 2020	Jiri Patera	3-year†‡	
July 16, 2020	Jack Dugan	2-year†‡	
October 3, 2020	Robin Lehner	5-year‡	
Legend: † Contract is entry-level. ‡ Contract begins in 2020–21 season.

== Draft picks ==
Below are the Vegas Golden Knights' selections at the 2019 NHL entry draft, which was held on June 21 to 22, 2019, at Rogers Arena in Vancouver.

Round	#	Player	Pos.	Nationality	Team (League)
1	17	Peyton Krebs	C	Canada	Kootenay Ice (WHL)
2	41	Kaedan Korczak	D	Canada	Kelowna Rockets (WHL)
3	79	Pavel Dorofeyev	LW	Russia	Metallurg Magnitogorsk (KHL)
3	86	Layton Ahac	D	Canada	Prince George Spruce Kings (BCHL)
4	110	Ryder Donovan	C	United States	Dubuque Fighting Saints (USHL)
5	135	Isaiah Saville	G	United States	Tri-City Storm (USHL)
5	139	Marcus Kallionkieli	LW	Finland	Sioux City Musketeers (USHL)
5	141	Mason Primeau	C	Canada	North Bay Battalion (OHL)
