= 2019–20 Pittsburgh Penguins season =

NHL team season

2019–20 Pittsburgh Penguins
- Division: 3rd Metropolitan
- Conference: 5th Eastern
- 2019–20 record: 40–23–6
- Home record: 23–8–4
- Road record: 17–15–2
- Goals for: 224
- Goals against: 196

Team information
- General manager: Jim Rutherford
- Coach: Mike Sullivan
- Captain: Sidney Crosby
- Alternate captains: Kris Letang; Evgeni Malkin
- Arena: PPG Paints Arena
- Average attendance: 18,537
- Minor league affiliates: Wilkes-Barre/Scranton Penguins (AHL); Wheeling Nailers (ECHL)

Team leaders
- Goals: Bryan Rust (27)
- Assists: Evgeni Malkin (49)
- Points: Evgeni Malkin (74)
- Penalty minutes: Evgeni Malkin (58)
- Plus/minus: Brian Dumoulin; John Marino (+17)
- Wins: Tristan Jarry; Matt Murray (20)
- Goals against average: Tristan Jarry (2.43)

The 2019–20 Pittsburgh Penguins season was the fifty-third season for the National Hockey League team that was established on June 5, 1967. This season saw the team try to extend its playoff streak to fourteen seasons.

== Background ==
This season was suspended by the league officials on March 12, 2020, after several other professional and collegiate sports organizations suspended their seasons due to the ongoing COVID-19 pandemic. On May 26, the NHL regular season was officially declared over with the remaining games being cancelled.

The Penguins advanced to the playoffs. Prior to the pause however, after taking the lead in the Metropolitan Division on February 18, the Penguins suffered a crucial six-game losing streak which coincided with both the Washington Capitals and Philadelphia Flyers (the latter of whom were on a nine-game winning streak) surpassing the Penguins in the standings. This dropped the Penguins into third in the division and fifth in the conference. The modified playoff format kept the Penguins from being among the top four teams in the conference. When the Penguins returned to play as the fifth seed, the team lost to the twelfth-seeded Montreal Canadiens in the best-of-five qualifying round.

== Standings ==
=== Divisional standings ===
Metropolitan Division
Pos	Team	GP	W	L	OTL	RW	GF	GA	GD	Pts
1	Washington Capitals	69	41	20	8	31	240	215	+25	90
2	Philadelphia Flyers	69	41	21	7	31	232	196	+36	89
3	Pittsburgh Penguins	69	40	23	6	29	224	196	+28	86
4	Carolina Hurricanes	68	38	25	5	27	222	193	+29	81
5	Columbus Blue Jackets	70	33	22	15	25	180	187	−7	81
6	New York Islanders	68	35	23	10	24	192	193	−1	80
7	New York Rangers	70	37	28	5	31	234	222	+12	79
8	New Jersey Devils	69	28	29	12	22	189	230	−41	68

Source: National Hockey League

=== Eastern Conference ===
Pos	Team	GP	W	L	OTL	RW	GF	GA	GD	PCT	Qualification
1	Boston Bruins	70	44	14	12	38	227	174	+53	.714	Advance to Seeding round-robin tournament
2	Tampa Bay Lightning	70	43	21	6	35	245	195	+50	.657	Advance to Seeding round-robin tournament
3	Washington Capitals	69	41	20	8	31	240	215	+25	.652	Advance to Seeding round-robin tournament
4	Philadelphia Flyers	69	41	21	7	31	232	196	+36	.645	Advance to Seeding round-robin tournament
5	Pittsburgh Penguins	69	40	23	6	29	224	196	+28	.623	Advance to 2020 Stanley Cup playoffs qualifying round
6	Carolina Hurricanes	68	38	25	5	27	222	193	+29	.596	Advance to 2020 Stanley Cup playoffs qualifying round
7	New York Islanders	68	35	23	10	24	192	193	−1	.588	Advance to 2020 Stanley Cup playoffs qualifying round
8	Toronto Maple Leafs	70	36	25	9	28	238	227	+11	.579	Advance to 2020 Stanley Cup playoffs qualifying round
9	Columbus Blue Jackets	70	33	22	15	25	180	187	−7	.579	Advance to 2020 Stanley Cup playoffs qualifying round
10	Florida Panthers	69	35	26	8	30	231	228	+3	.565	Advance to 2020 Stanley Cup playoffs qualifying round
11	New York Rangers	70	37	28	5	31	234	222	+12	.564	Advance to 2020 Stanley Cup playoffs qualifying round
12	Montreal Canadiens	71	31	31	9	19	212	221	−9	.500	Advance to 2020 Stanley Cup playoffs qualifying round
13	Buffalo Sabres	69	30	31	8	22	195	217	−22	.493	
14	New Jersey Devils	69	28	29	12	22	189	230	−41	.493	
15	Ottawa Senators	71	25	34	12	18	191	243	−52	.437	
16	Detroit Red Wings	71	17	49	5	13	145	267	−122	.275	

Source: National Hockey League

== Schedule and results ==
=== Preseason ===
The preseason schedule was published on June 18, 2019.

2019 preseason game log: 2–1–3 (Home: 2–0–1; Road: 0–1–2)

#	Date	Visitor	Score	Home	Location	Attendance	Record
1	September 16	Pittsburgh	4–5 OT	Buffalo	Pegula Ice Arena	5,497	0–0–1
2	September 19	Columbus	1–4	Pittsburgh	PPG Paints Arena	15,649	1–0–1
3	September 21	Pittsburgh	1–3	Columbus	Nationwide Arena	13,637	1–1–1
4	September 22	Pittsburgh	2–3 OT	Detroit	Little Caesars Arena	16,093	1–1–2
5	September 25	Detroit	2–4	Pittsburgh	PPG Paints Arena	15,112	2–1–2
6	September 28	Buffalo	3–2 SO	Pittsburgh	PPG Paints Arena	18,325	2–1–3

Legend: = Win = Loss = OT/SO Loss

=== Regular season ===
The regular season schedule was published on June 25, 2019.

2019–20 game log
October: 8–5–0 (Home: 5–3–0; Road: 3–2–0)

#	Date	Visitor	Score	Home	Location	Attendance	Record	Points
1	October 3	Buffalo	3–1	Pittsburgh	PPG Paints Arena	18,616	0–1–0	0
2	October 5	Columbus	2–7	Pittsburgh	PPG Paints Arena	18,595	1–1–0	2
3	October 8	Winnipeg	4–1	Pittsburgh	PPG Paints Arena	18,420	1–2–0	2
4	October 10	Anaheim	1–2	Pittsburgh	PPG Paints Arena	18,414	2–2–0	4
5	October 12	Pittsburgh	7–4	Minnesota	Xcel Energy Center	19,157	3–2–0	6
6	October 13	Pittsburgh	7–2	Winnipeg	Bell MTS Place	15,325	4–2–0	8
7	October 16	Colorado	2–3 OT	Pittsburgh	PPG Paints Arena	18,458	5–2–0	10
8	October 18	Dallas	2–4	Pittsburgh	PPG Paints Arena	18,482	6–2–0	12
9	October 19	Vegas	3–0	Pittsburgh	PPG Paints Arena	19,610	6–3–0	12
10	October 22	Pittsburgh	2–4	Florida	BB&T Center	12,738	6–4–0	12
11	October 23	Pittsburgh	2–3	Tampa Bay	Amalie Arena	19,092	6–5–0	12
12	October 26	Pittsburgh	3–0	Dallas	American Airlines Center	18,532	7–5–0	14
13	October 29	Philadelphia	1–7	Pittsburgh	PPG Paints Arena	18,560	8–5–0	16

November: 6–4–4 (Home: 5–0–2; Road: 1–4–2)

#	Date	Visitor	Score	Home	Location	Attendance	Record	Points
14	November 2	Edmonton	2–1 OT	Pittsburgh	PPG Paints Arena	18,618	8–5–1	17
15	November 4	Pittsburgh	4–6	Boston	TD Garden	17,193	8–6–1	17
16	November 7	Pittsburgh	4–3 OT	NY Islanders	Barclays Center	12,613	9–6–1	19
17	November 9	Chicago	2–3 SO	Pittsburgh	PPG Paints Arena	18,653	10–6–1	21
18	November 12	Pittsburgh	2–3 OT	NY Rangers	Madison Square Garden	16,904	10–6–2	22
19	November 15	Pittsburgh	1–2	New Jersey	Prudential Center	16,514	10–7–2	22
20	November 16	Toronto	1–6	Pittsburgh	PPG Paints Arena	18,587	11–7–2	24
21	November 19	NY Islanders	5–4 OT	Pittsburgh	PPG Paints Arena	18,411	11–7–3	25
22	November 21	Pittsburgh	3–4 OT	NY Islanders	Barclays Center	13,212	11–7–4	26
23	November 22	New Jersey	1–4	Pittsburgh	PPG Paints Arena	18,420	12–7–4	28
24	November 25	Calgary	2–3 OT	Pittsburgh	PPG Paints Arena	18,437	13–7–4	30
25	November 27	Vancouver	6–8	Pittsburgh	PPG Paints Arena	18,465	14–7–4	32
26	November 29	Pittsburgh	2–5	Columbus	Nationwide Arena	17,402	14–8–4	32
27	November 30	Pittsburgh	2–5	St. Louis	Enterprise Center	18,096	14–9–4	32

December: 10–2–0 (Home: 6–1–0; Road: 4–1–0)

#	Date	Visitor	Score	Home	Location	Attendance	Record	Points
28	December 4	St. Louis	0–3	Pittsburgh	PPG Paints Arena	18,411	15–9–4	34
29	December 6	Arizona	0–2	Pittsburgh	PPG Paints Arena	18,432	16–9–4	36
30	December 7	Pittsburgh	5–3	Detroit	Little Caesars Arena	19,515	17–9–4	38
31	December 10	Montreal	4–1	Pittsburgh	PPG Paints Arena	18,422	17–10–4	38
32	December 12	Columbus	0–1 OT	Pittsburgh	PPG Paints Arena	18,415	18–10–4	40
33	December 14	Los Angeles	4–5 SO	Pittsburgh	PPG Paints Arena	18,581	19–10–4	42
34	December 17	Pittsburgh	4–1	Calgary	Scotiabank Saddledome	18,412	20–10–4	44
35	December 20	Pittsburgh	5–2	Edmonton	Rogers Place	18,347	21–10–4	46
36	December 21	Pittsburgh	1–4	Vancouver	Rogers Arena	18,285	21–11–4	46
37	December 27	Pittsburgh	5–2	Nashville	Bridgestone Arena	17,849	22–11–4	48
38	December 28	Nashville	4–6	Pittsburgh	PPG Paints Arena	18,628	23–11–4	50
39	December 30	Ottawa	2–5	Pittsburgh	PPG Paints Arena	18,653	24–11–4	52

January: 8–3–1 (Home: 3–1–1; Road: 5–2–0)

#	Date	Visitor	Score	Home	Location	Attendance	Record	Points
40	January 2	San Jose	3–2 OT	Pittsburgh	PPG Paints Arena	18,620	24–11–5	53
41	January 4	Pittsburgh	3–2 OT	Montreal	Bell Centre	21,302	25–11–5	55
42	January 5	Florida	4–1	Pittsburgh	PPG Paints Arena	18,564	25–12–5	55
43	January 7	Pittsburgh	4–3	Vegas	T-Mobile Arena	18,298	26–12–5	57
44	January 10	Pittsburgh	4–3 OT	Colorado	Pepsi Center	18,132	27–12–5	59
45	January 12	Pittsburgh	4–3 SO	Arizona	Gila River Arena	13,755	28–12–5	61
46	January 14	Minnesota	3–7	Pittsburgh	PPG Paints Arena	18,545	29–12–5	63
47	January 16	Pittsburgh	1–4	Boston	TD Garden	17,850	29–13–5	63
48	January 17	Pittsburgh	2–1 OT	Detroit	Little Caesars Arena	19,515	30–13–5	65
49	January 19	Boston	3–4	Pittsburgh	PPG Paints Arena	18,655	31–13–5	67
50	January 21	Pittsburgh	0–3	Philadelphia	Wells Fargo Center	19,120	31–14–5	67
51	January 31	Philadelphia	3–4 OT	Pittsburgh	PPG Paints Arena	18,647	32–14–5	69

February: 5–7–1 (Home: 3–1–1; Road: 2–6–0)

#	Date	Visitor	Score	Home	Location	Attendance	Record	Points
52	February 2	Pittsburgh	4–3	Washington	Capital One Arena	18,573	33–14–5	71
53	February 6	Pittsburgh	2–4	Tampa Bay	Amalie Arena	19,092	33–15–5	71
54	February 8	Pittsburgh	3–2	Florida	BB&T Center	17,773	34–15–5	73
55	February 11	Tampa Bay	2–1 OT	Pittsburgh	PPG Paints Arena	18,445	34–15–6	74
56	February 14	Montreal	1–4	Pittsburgh	PPG Paints Arena	18,650	35–15–6	76
57	February 16	Detroit	1–5	Pittsburgh	PPG Paints Arena	18,654	36–15–6	78
58	February 18	Toronto	2–5	Pittsburgh	PPG Paints Arena	18,466	37–15–6	80
59	February 20	Pittsburgh	0–4	Toronto	Scotiabank Arena	19,386	37–16–6	80
60	February 22	Buffalo	5–2	Pittsburgh	PPG Paints Arena	18,620	37–17–6	80
61	February 23	Pittsburgh	3–5	Washington	Capital One Arena	18,573	37–18–6	80
62	February 26	Pittsburgh	1–2	Los Angeles	Staples Center	16,898	37–19–6	80
63	February 28	Pittsburgh	2–3	Anaheim	Honda Center	16,588	37–20–6	80
64	February 29	Pittsburgh	0–5	San Jose	SAP Center	17,562	37–21–6	80

March: 3–2–0 (Home: 1–2–0; Road: 2–0–0)

#	Date	Visitor	Score	Home	Location	Attendance	Record	Points
65	March 3	Ottawa	3–7	Pittsburgh	PPG Paints Arena	18,455	38–21–6	82
66	March 5	Pittsburgh	4–2	Buffalo	KeyBank Center	18,236	39–21–6	84
67	March 7	Washington	5–2	Pittsburgh	PPG Paints Arena	18,656	39–22–6	84
68	March 8	Carolina	6–2	Pittsburgh	PPG Paints Arena	18,548	39–23–6	84
69	March 10	Pittsburgh	5–2	New Jersey	Prudential Center	13,473	40–23–6	86

Cancelled games

#	Date	Visitor	Home	Location
70	March 12	Pittsburgh	Columbus	Nationwide Arena
71	March 14	Pittsburgh	Carolina	PNC Arena
72	March 15	NY Islanders	Pittsburgh	PPG Paints Arena
73	March 18	Pittsburgh	NY Rangers	Madison Square Garden
74	March 20	NY Rangers	Pittsburgh	PPG Paints Arena
75	March 22	Washington	Pittsburgh	PPG Paints Arena
76	March 24	Carolina	Pittsburgh	PPG Paints Arena
77	March 25	Pittsburgh	Chicago	United Center
78	March 28	Pittsburgh	Carolina	PNC Arena
79	March 29	Pittsburgh	Philadelphia	Wells Fargo Center
80	March 31	New Jersey	Pittsburgh	PPG Paints Arena
81	April 2	NY Rangers	Pittsburgh	PPG Paints Arena
82	April 4	Pittsburgh	Ottawa	Canadian Tire Centre

Legend: = Win = Loss = OT/SO Loss

=== Playoffs ===
The Penguins were defeated by the Montreal Canadiens in the qualifying round in four games.

2020 Stanley Cup playoffs
Eastern Conference Qualifying Round vs. (12) Montreal Canadiens: Montreal won 3–1

#	Date	Visitor	Score	Home	OT	Decision	Series	Recap
1	August 1	Montreal	3–2	Pittsburgh	OT	Murray	0–1	Recap
2	August 3	Montreal	1–3	Pittsburgh		Murray	1–1	Recap
3	August 5	Pittsburgh	3–4	Montreal		Murray	1–2	Recap
4	August 7	Pittsburgh	0–2	Montreal		Jarry	1–3	Recap

Legend: = Win = Loss

== Player statistics ==
Skaters

Regular season
Player	GP	G	A	Pts	+/−	PIM
Evgeni Malkin	55	25	49	74	7	58
Bryan Rust	55	27	29	56	14	30
Sidney Crosby	41	16	31	47	-8	15
Kris Letang	61	15	29	44	0	38
Jake Guentzel	39	20	23	43	11	14
Jared McCann	66	14	21	35	6	17
Patric Hornqvist	52	17	15	32	9	36
Dominik Kahun^{‡}	50	10	17	27	6	8
John Marino	56	6	20	26	17	20
Brandon Tanev	68	11	14	25	-1	16
Teddy Blueger	69	9	13	22	2	25
Dominik Simon	64	7	15	22	-9	12
Marcus Pettersson	69	2	20	22	9	35
Alex Galchenyuk^{‡}	45	5	12	17	-7	10
Sam Lafferty	50	6	7	13	5	23
Zach Aston-Reese	57	6	7	13	6	28
Jason Zucker^{†}	15	6	6	12	-1	2
Justin Schultz	46	3	9	12	-13	6
Jack Johnson	67	3	8	11	-1	26
Brian Dumoulin	28	1	7	8	17	10
Juuso Riikola	36	1	6	7	3	6
Chad Ruhwedel	41	2	4	6	4	12
Joseph Blandisi	21	2	3	5	-3	10
Conor Sheary^{†}	8	1	3	4	-1	2
Patrick Marleau^{†}	8	1	1	2	0	2
Nick Bjugstad	13	1	1	2	3	8
Adam Johnson	7	1	1	2	-1	2
Andrew Agozzino^{‡}	17	0	2	2	0	4
Stefan Noesen^{‡}	6	1	0	1	0	0
Anthony Angello	8	1	0	1	-1	4
Evan Rodrigues^{†}	7	1	0	1	0	4
Erik Gudbranson	7	0	0	0	0	4
Zach Trotman	8	0	0	0	-1	4
Thomas Di Pauli	2	0	0	0	-3	10
Total		221	373	594	—	501

Playoffs
Player	GP	G	A	Pts	+/−	PIM
Sidney Crosby	4	2	1	3	0	0
Bryan Rust	4	1	2	3	-2	2
Jake Guentzel	4	1	2	3	1	0
Jason Zucker	4	2	0	2	0	0
Patric Hornqvist	4	1	1	2	-3	0
Conor Sheary	4	0	2	2	3	2
Teddy Blueger	4	1	0	1	-1	0
Evgeni Malkin	4	0	1	1	-3	6
Justin Schultz	4	0	1	1	-4	0
Brian Dumoulin	4	0	1	1	0	4
Jared McCann	3	0	1	1	-1	2
John Marino	4	0	1	1	-1	2
Brandon Tanev	4	0	1	1	-2	0
Zach Aston-Reese	4	0	1	1	-3	2
Patrick Marleau	4	0	0	0	-4	0
Jack Johnson	4	0	0	0	-4	0
Kris Letang	4	0	0	0	-2	0
Marcus Pettersson	4	0	0	0	1	4
Sam Lafferty	1	0	0	0	-1	0
Total		8	15	23	—	24

Goaltenders

Regular season
Player	GP	GS	TOI	W	L	OT	GA	GAA	SA	SV%	SO	G	A	PIM
Tristan Jarry	33	31	1926:29	20	12	1	78	2.43	985	0.921	3	0	0	0
Matt Murray	38	38	2237:30	20	11	5	107	2.87	1055	0.899	1	0	1	2
Total		69	4163:59	40	23	6	185	2.67	2040	0.909	4	0	1	2

Playoffs
Player	GP	GS	TOI	W	L	OT	GA	GAA	SA	SV%	SO	G	A	PIM
Matt Murray	3	3	192:07	1	2	0	8	2.5	93	0.914	0	0	0	0
Tristan Jarry	1	1	58:46	0	1	0	1	1.02	21	0.952	0	0	0	0
Total		4	250:53	1	3	0	9	2.16	114	0.921	0	0	0	0

^{†}Denotes player spent time with another team before joining the Penguins. Stats reflect time with the Penguins only.
^{‡}Denotes player was traded mid-season. Stats reflect time with the Penguins only.

== Awards and honours ==
- Kris Letang became the first defenseman to record 500 points for the Pittsburgh Penguins. He set the mark in a 7–2 win over the Winnipeg Jets on October 13.

== Transactions ==
The Penguins have been involved in the following transactions during the 2019–20 season.

=== Trades ===
Date	Details	
June 29, 2019	To Arizona Coyotes Phil Kessel; Dane Birks; 4th-round pick in 2021	To Pittsburgh Penguins Alex Galchenyuk; Pierre-Olivier Joseph
October 25, 2019	To Anaheim Ducks Erik Gudbranson	To Pittsburgh Penguins Andreas Martinsen; 7th-round pick in 2021
February 10, 2020	To Minnesota Wild Alex Galchenyuk; Calen Addison; Conditional 1st-round pick in 2020	To Pittsburgh Penguins Jason Zucker
February 24, 2020	To San Jose Sharks Conditional 3rd-round pick in 2020.^{[a]}	To Pittsburgh Penguins Patrick Marleau
February 24, 2020	To Buffalo Sabres Dominik Kahun	To Pittsburgh Penguins Conor Sheary; Evan Rodrigues
August 25, 2020	To Pittsburgh Penguins Kasperi Kapanen; Pontus Åberg; Jesper Lindgren	To Toronto Maple Leafs David Warsofsky; Evan Rodrigues; Filip Hållander; 1st-round pick in 2020
September 11, 2020	To Minnesota Wild Nick Bjugstad*	To Pittsburgh Penguins Conditional 7th-round pick in 2021
September 24, 2020	To Florida Panthers Patric Hörnqvist	To Pittsburgh Penguins Mike Matheson; Colton Sceviour

- ^{a} - Third-round pick becomes a second-rounder if the Pittsburgh Penguins win the Stanley Cup in 2020.

=== Free agents ===
Player	Acquired from	Lost to	Date	Contract terms
Brandon Tanev	Winnipeg Jets		July 1, 2019	6-years for $21 million
Andrew Agozzino	Colorado Avalanche		July 1, 2019	2-years for $1.4 million
David Warsofsky	Colorado Avalanche		July 1, 2019	2-years for $1.4 million

=== Waivers ===
Date	Player	To/From	Team
December 19, 2019	Stefan Noesen	→	San Jose Sharks

=== Contract terminations ===
Date	Player	Via	Ref
July 1, 2019			

=== Retirement ===
Date	Player	Ref

=== Signings ===
Player	Date	Contract terms
Kevin Czuczman	June 26, 2019	2-years for $700,000^{[ext]}
Zach Trotman	June 26, 2019	2-years for $700,000^{[ext]}
Joseph Blandisi	July 3, 2019	1-year for $700,000
Adam Johnson	July 3, 2019	1-year for $700,000
Teddy Blueger	July 16, 2019	2-years for $1.5 million
Zach Aston-Reese	July 22, 2019	2-years for $2 million
John Marino	August 8, 2019	Entry-level contract
Marcus Pettersson	January 28, 2020	5-years for $20,125,875^{[ext]}

- ^{ext} - Contract extension.

== Draft picks ==
Below are the Pittsburgh Penguins' selections at the 2019 NHL entry draft, which was held on June 21 and 22, 2019, at Rogers Arena in Vancouver, British Columbia.

Round	#	Player	Pos	Nationality	College/Junior/Club team (League)
1	21	Samuel Poulin	RW	Canada	Sherbrooke Phoenix (QMJHL)
3	74^{[1]}	Nathan Legare	RW	Canada	Baie-Comeau Drakkar (QMJHL)
5	145	Judd Caulfield	RW	United States	U.S. NTDP (USHL)
7	203^{[2]}	Valtteri Puustinen	RW	Finland	HPK (Liiga)
7	211^{[3]}	Santeri Airola	D	Finland	SaiPa U20 (Nuorten SM-liiga)

Notes:

- ^{1} - The Chicago Blackhawks' third-round pick went to the Pittsburgh Penguins as the result of a trade on June 22, 2019, that sent Buffalo's fourth-round pick, Tampa Bay's fifth-round pick and a seventh-round pick all in 2019 (98th, 151st and 207th overall) to Arizona in exchange for this pick.
- ^{2} The Vegas Golden Knights' seventh-round pick went to the Pittsburgh Penguins as the result of a trade on June 23, 2018, that sent a seventh-round pick in 2018 to Vegas in exchange for this pick.
- ^{3} The Washington Capitals' seventh-round pick went to the Pittsburgh Penguins as the result of a trade on June 22, 2019, that sent a seventh-round pick in 2020 to San Jose in exchange for this pick.
