= Alex Galchenyuk =

American ice hockey player (born 1994)

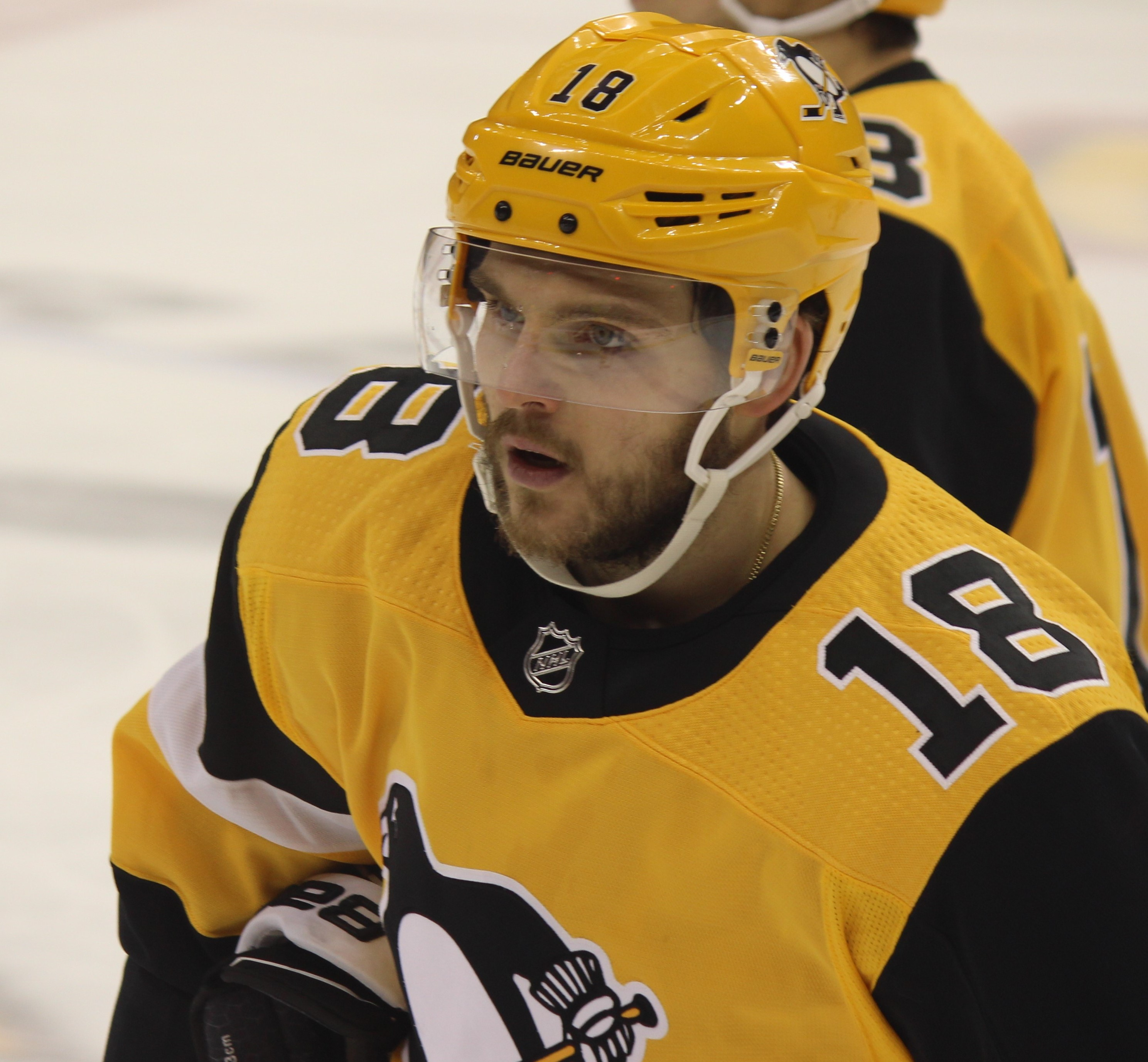
- Galchenyuk with the Pittsburgh Penguins in 2019
- Born: February 12, 1994 (age 32) Milwaukee, Wisconsin, U.S.
- Height: 6 ft 1 in (185 cm)
- Weight: 207 lb (94 kg; 14 st 11 lb)
- Position: Center
- Shoots: Left
- KHL team Former teams: Sibir Novosibirsk; Montreal Canadiens; Arizona Coyotes; Pittsburgh Penguins; Minnesota Wild; Ottawa Senators; Toronto Maple Leafs; Colorado Avalanche; SKA Saint Petersburg; Amur Khabarovsk; Spartak Moscow
- National team: United States
- NHL draft: 3rd overall, 2012; Montreal Canadiens
- Playing career: 2012–present

Alexander Alexandrovich Galchenyuk (Belarusian: Аляксандр Аляксандравіч Гальчанюк, Russian: Александр Александрович Гальченюк) (born February 12, 1994) is an American professional ice hockey player who is a center for Sibir Novosibirsk of the Kontinental Hockey League (KHL). He was selected third overall by the Montreal Canadiens in the 2012 NHL entry draft. Galchenyuk has also previously played for the Arizona Coyotes, Pittsburgh Penguins, Minnesota Wild, Ottawa Senators, Toronto Maple Leafs, and Colorado Avalanche.

Galchenyuk is of Belarusian descent, but was born in the United States and has represented the United States internationally. As of 2025, he has acquired the Russian citizenship.

== Playing career ==
=== Minor and junior ===
Galchenyuk played his final year of minor hockey with the U16 Chicago Young Americans and quickly became a star player, tallying 44 goals and 43 assists, leading coach Bruno Bragagnolo to refer to winning a lottery ticket as "the odds of having another kid like Alex play for you". His performance led to him being drafted number one in the 2010 Ontario Hockey League (OHL) Priority Selection Draft by the Sarnia Sting.

Galchenyuk was also selected 25th overall in the 2011 Kontinental Hockey League (KHL) Junior Draft by Atlant Moscow Oblast, which caused his father, Alexander Galchenyuk, to express his displeasure in Alex not being drafted in the first round by the Belarusian KHL team, Dinamo Minsk.

In his first season with the Sting, Galchenyuk recorded 31 goals and 52 assists for 83 total points, which led to him being selected to the OHL 1st All-Rookie team alongside teammate Nail Yakupov. The following year, he missed all but two regular-season games and six playoff games with a knee injury. He was selected third in the 2012 NHL entry draft by the Montreal Canadiens.

On July 23, 2012, Galchenyuk signed a three-year, entry-level contract with the Canadiens. During the 2012–13 NHL lockout, he played for Sarnia in the OHL, where he served as captain of the team during his final season for the Sting and where he dominated by recording 27 goals and 34 assists in 33 games.

=== Professional ===
==== Montreal Canadiens ====
Galchenyuk made the Canadiens roster for the 2012–13 season opener, a 2–1 loss to the Toronto Maple Leafs on January 19, 2013. He was the youngest player to play a full season with the Canadiens since 1984. He scored his first NHL goal on January 22, 2013, against Scott Clemmensen of the Florida Panthers, tipping-in a shot from Brandon Prust; rookie teammate Brendan Gallagher also recorded his first NHL point, an assist. Galchenyuk finished the season playing in all 48 games with 9 goals, 18 assists for 27 points and a plus-minus rating of +14, playing primarily on the left wing of the third line. He finished in the top ten in all three offensive categories among rookies, and was sixth overall in rookie points scoring, helping propel a resurgent Canadiens team to the second-best record in the Eastern Conference.

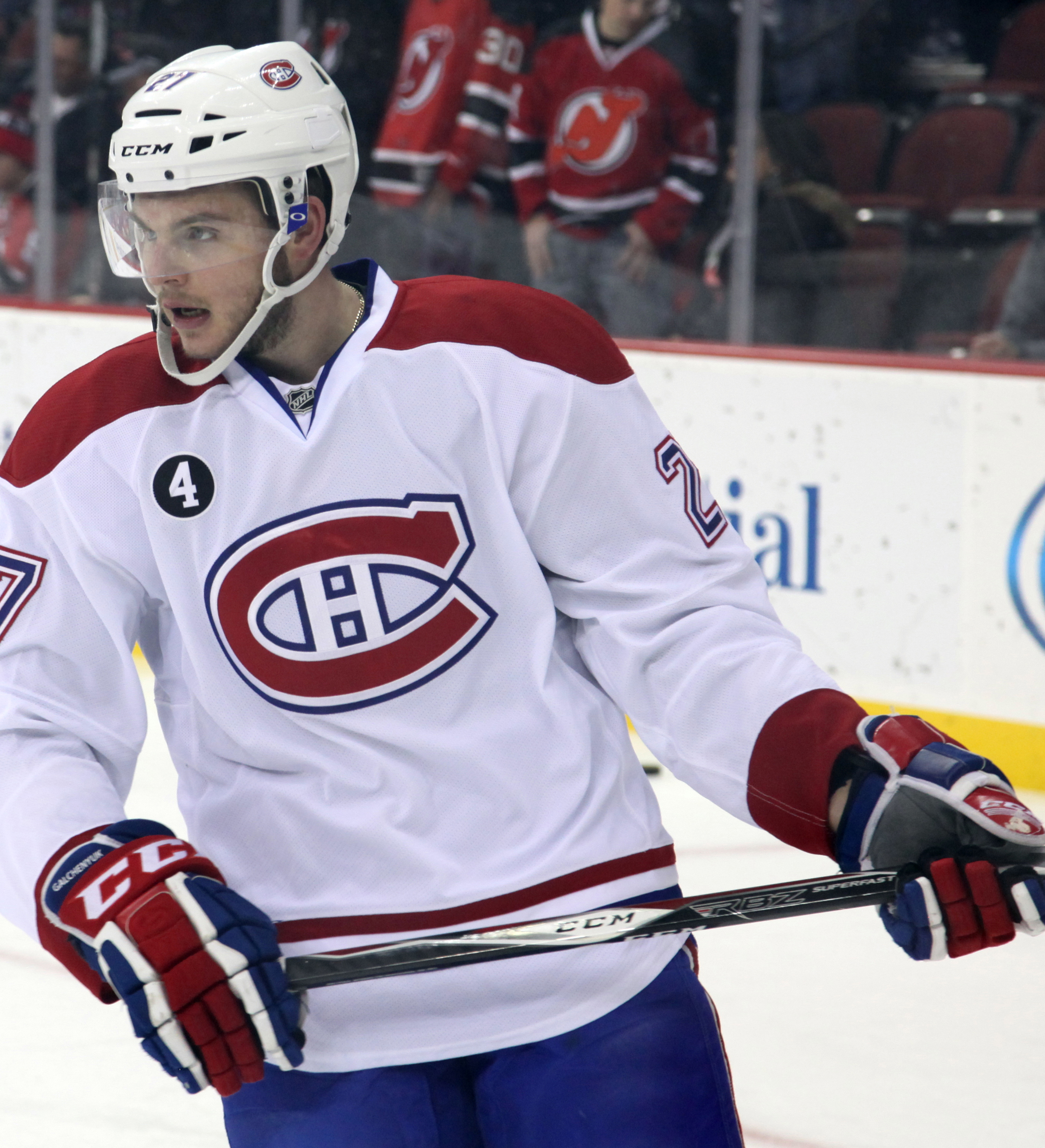
Galchenyuk with the Montreal Canadiens in 2015

During the 2013–14 season, Galchenyuk missed six weeks due to a broken hand. He finished the season with 13 goals and 31 points in 65 games.

Galchenyuk scored his first career hat-trick on December 16, 2014, against the Carolina Hurricanes. The 2014–15 season also marked Galchenyuk's first 20-goal campaign, as he tallied that amount in 80 games.

On July 30, 2015, Galchenyuk (as a restricted free agent) signed a two-year, $5.6 million contract extension with the Canadiens. The 2015–16, Galchenyuk tied captain Max Pacioretty with 30 goals to lead the team. Galchenyuk finished second in team scoring (behind Pacioretty) with 56 points.

On July 5, 2017, Galchenyuk signed a three-year, $14.7 million contract extension with the Canadiens. In the following 2017–18 campaign, Galchenyuk produced 51 points in his sixth season with the Canadiens.

==== Arizona Coyotes ====
On June 15, 2018, Galchenyuk was traded by the Canadiens to the Arizona Coyotes in exchange for Max Domi.

In his first season as a member of the Coyotes, Galchenyuk played in 72 games, with 19 goals and 22 assists.

==== Pittsburgh Penguins ====
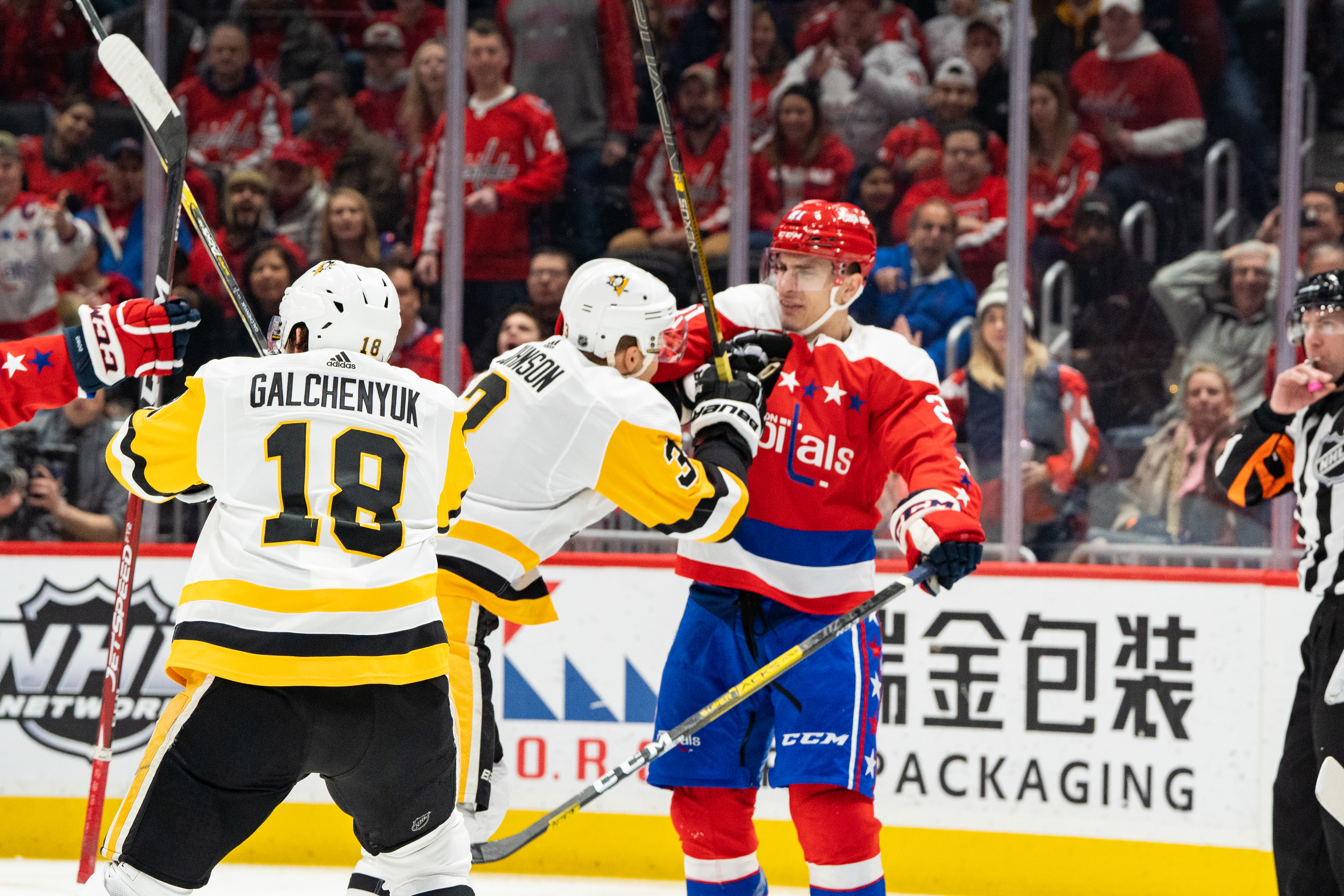
Galchenyuk (left foreground) with the Pittsburgh Penguins during a game in February 2020

On June 29, 2019, Galchenyuk was traded to the Pittsburgh Penguins along with Pierre-Olivier Joseph in exchange for Phil Kessel, Dane Birks, and a fourth-round pick in 2021. He suffered a lower-body injury early in the 2019–20 season and was placed on injured reserve on October 9, 2019. Galchenyuk returned to make 45 appearances with the Penguins, struggling to match his previous career offensive output in recording 5 goals and 17 points.

==== Minnesota Wild ====
On February 10, 2020, Galchenyuk, prospect Calen Addison, and Pittsburgh's first-round pick in the 2020 NHL entry draft were traded to the Minnesota Wild in exchange for Jason Zucker.

==== Ottawa Senators ====
On October 28, 2020, Galchenyuk signed as a free agent to join his fifth NHL club in the Ottawa Senators on a one-year, $1.05 million contract. Galchenyuk began the pandemic delayed 2020–21 season, on the Senators roster as a healthy scratch. Drawing into the lineup, Galchenyuk scored on his debut with the Senators in a 4–3 overtime defeat to the Winnipeg Jets on January 19, 2021. He was scoreless in his following 7 games, featuring in just 8 of the Senators opening 15 games.

==== Toronto Maple Leafs ====
On February 13, 2021, Galchenyuk, along with Cédric Paquette, were traded by the Senators to the Carolina Hurricanes in exchange for Ryan Dzingel. On the following day, Galchenyuk was placed on waivers by the Hurricanes and upon clearing was assigned for the first time in his career to the AHL joining affiliate, the Chicago Wolves, on February 15, 2021. That same day, before he could join the Wolves, Galchenyuk was traded by the Hurricanes to the Toronto Maple Leafs in exchange for Yegor Korshkov and David Warsofsky.

The Galchenyuk acquisition was initially seen as an insignificant depth move, and after the trade he originally played for the team's AHL affiliate, the Toronto Marlies. After putting up eight points in six games, Galchenyuk was called up to the Maple Leafs, eventually making his debut on March 19 on a line alongside William Nylander and John Tavares. He spent the rest of the season in the NHL, impressing fans and team staff to the extent that Maple Leafs general manager Kyle Dubas admitted to reporters that Galchenyuk's surprising success led the Maple Leafs to adjust their plans for the season's trade deadline. He finished the season with 12 points in 26 games played with the Maple Leafs, helping the team win their division. In the playoffs, Galchenyuk recorded four points in six games, but the Leafs were ultimately defeated in the first round by Galchenyuk's former team, the Montreal Canadiens.

==== Return to Arizona ====
On September 21, 2021, Galchenyuk was signed to a professional tryout (PTO) contract with the Coyotes, making his return to Arizona after being traded by the franchise in the 2019 off-season. On October 5, Galchenyuk was signed to a one-year, $750,000 contract with the Coyotes. In the 2020–21 season, Galchenyuk played in a top-nine forward role for the rebuilding Coyotes, registering 6 goals and 15 assists to finish seventh amongst forward scoring with 21 points through 60 regular season games.

==== Colorado Avalanche ====
As a free agent at the conclusion of his contract with the Coyotes, Galchenyuk remained unsigned over the summer and for the second consecutive year accepted a PTO invitation to join the Colorado Avalanche's training camp on September 20, 2022. Galchenyuk remained with the Avalanche through training camp before he was injured in his debut preseason game, resulting in his release from his tryout on September 29.

In recovering from his injury and remaining within the Avalanche organization, Galchenyuk was signed to an AHL contract to begin his 2022–23 season with affiliate, the Colorado Eagles, on November 10, 2022. In recording 7 points through 7 games with the Eagles, Galchenyuk was then signed to a one-year, two-way $750,000 contract with the Avalanche for the remainder of the season on November 28, 2022. In joining the Avalanche, Galchenyuk made his debut on the road the following day in a 5–0 shutout defeat to the Winnipeg Jets. After going scoreless through four games with the Avalanche, Galchenyuk was placed on waivers and returned to the Eagles upon clearing on December 6, 2022.

==== Third tenure with Arizona, arrest ====
On June 24, 2023, the Avalanche traded Galchenyuk - a pending unrestricted free agent - to the Nashville Predators in exchange for Ryan Johansen. The Predators did not sign Galchenyuk, making him an unrestricted free agent. On July 1, 2023, he signed a one-year, two-way contract to return to the Coyotes organization.

On July 13, Galchenyuk was placed on unconditional waivers by the Coyotes for the purpose of terminating his contract. The team refused to further comment on the matter, and an investigation was conducted by the National Hockey League Players' Association (NHLPA). It was later revealed that Galchenyuk had been arrested on July 9 on multiple charges, including hit and run, disorderly conduct, failure to obey, and resisting arrest. On July 18, Galchenyuk announced he would enter the NHL/NHLPA player assistance program.

==== Kontinental Hockey League ====
With NHL interest ceased as a free agent, Galchenyuk opted to pursue his professional career abroad by agreeing to a two-year contract with SKA Saint Petersburg of the Kontinental Hockey League (KHL) on August 25, 2023. In the 2023–24 season, Galchenyuk matched his previous season totals in registering 16 goals and 42 points through 61 regular season games. He helped SKA advance to the second round, collecting 5 points through 9 appearances.

Opting not to proceed with the second year of his contract with SKA, Galchenyuk was signed by fellow Russian club, Amur Khabarovsk on a one-year deal, on May 17, 2024.

After two seasons with Amur, Galchenyuk was again on the move, signing as a free agent to a two-year contract with his third KHL club, Spartak Moscow, on June 4, 2026.

On November 12, 2026, hockey clubs Sibir Novosibirsk and Spartak Moscow completed a trade that sent Galchenyuk to Novosibirsk, while the Moscow club received young defenseman Alexander Grunin and financial compensation.

== Personal life ==
Galchenyuk was born in Milwaukee, Wisconsin, to former Soviet and Belarusian hockey player Alexander Galchenyuk and a Belarusian mother. He has an older sister, Anna. Galchenyuk's father was a member of the International Hockey League (IHL)'s Milwaukee Admirals at the time of his birth. The family moved to Europe when Galchenyuk was four, following his father's hockey career in Germany, Italy and Russia. They eventually settled in Russia, where the younger Galchenyuk began his hockey career before moving back to North America when he was 15, first to Chicago, Illinois, and then to Sarnia, Ontario, where Alex Galchenyuk Sr. coaches.

On March 5, 2025, Amur Khabarovsk, the team he played for, announced that Galchenyuk had become a Russian citizen and now had a Russian passport.

Galchenyuk is fluent in Russian, Italian and English.

=== Legal issues ===
In 2016, Galchenyuk's then-girlfriend, Chanel Leszczynski, was arrested for assault following a domestic dispute at his apartment. Galchenyuk and teammate Devante Smith-Pelly were questioned by Montreal police. Galchenyuk declined to file a domestic violence complaint and the Crown ultimately did not prosecute the case.

In 2017, former Canadiens coach Mario Tremblay claimed he heard that Galchenyuk had been to rehab twice, an allegation neither confirmed nor denied by Galchenyuk or the team.

On July 9, 2023, Galchenyuk was arrested on multiple charges that included "private property hit and run, disorderly conduct, failure to obey, resisting arrest and threatening or intimidating." As a result of the arrest, his contract with the Arizona Coyotes was terminated. Galchenyuk made violent threats and racial slurs at police officers during his arrest. On July 18, 2023, Galchenyuk released a statement apologizing for the incident, admitting that he was intoxicated with alcohol. Body cam footage of the July incident was released on November 9, 2023.

== Career statistics ==
=== Regular season and playoffs ===
			Regular season					Playoffs
Season	Team	League	GP	G	A	Pts	PIM	GP	G	A	Pts	PIM
2009–10	Chicago Young Americans	MWEHL	38	44	43	87	56	—	—	—	—	—
2010–11	Sarnia Sting	OHL	68	31	52	83	52	—	—	—	—	—
2011–12	Sarnia Sting	OHL	2	0	0	0	0	6	2	2	4	4
2012–13	Sarnia Sting	OHL	33	27	34	61	22	—	—	—	—	—
2012–13	Montreal Canadiens	NHL	48	9	18	27	20	5	1	2	3	0
2013–14	Montreal Canadiens	NHL	65	13	18	31	26	5	2	1	3	2
2014–15	Montreal Canadiens	NHL	80	20	26	46	39	12	1	3	4	10
2015–16	Montreal Canadiens	NHL	82	30	26	56	20	—	—	—	—	—
2016–17	Montreal Canadiens	NHL	61	17	27	44	24	6	0	3	3	4
2017–18	Montreal Canadiens	NHL	82	19	32	51	22	—	—	—	—	—
2018–19	Arizona Coyotes	NHL	72	19	22	41	34	—	—	—	—	—
2019–20	Pittsburgh Penguins	NHL	45	5	12	17	10	—	—	—	—	—
2019–20	Minnesota Wild	NHL	14	3	4	7	6	4	0	0	0	4
2020–21	Ottawa Senators	NHL	8	1	0	1	6	—	—	—	—	—
2020–21	Toronto Marlies	AHL	6	2	6	8	2	—	—	—	—	—
2020–21	Toronto Maple Leafs	NHL	26	4	8	12	14	6	1	3	4	4
2021–22	Arizona Coyotes	NHL	60	6	15	21	32	—	—	—	—	—
2022–23	Colorado Eagles	AHL	42	16	26	42	22	7	0	3	3	10
2022–23	Colorado Avalanche	NHL	11	0	0	0	4	—	—	—	—	—
2023–24	SKA Saint Petersburg	KHL	61	16	26	42	42	9	2	3	5	4
2024–25	Amur Khabarovsk	KHL	59	20	18	38	24	—	—	—	—	—
2025–26	Amur Khabarovsk	KHL	52	13	17	30	14	—	—	—	—	—
NHL totals			654	146	208	354	257	38	5	12	17	24
KHL totals			172	49	61	110	80	9	2	3	5	4

Medal record

Representing the United States

Ice hockey

IIHF World U20 Championship
Gold medal – first place	2013 Russia	

World Championships
Bronze medal – third place	2013 Stockholm/Helsinki	

=== International ===
Year	Team	Event	Result	GP	G	A	Pts	PIM
2013	United States	WJC	1st place, gold medalist(s)	7	2	6	8	4
2013	United States	WC	3rd place, bronze medalist(s)	4	2	0	2	0
2022	United States	WC	4th	10	1	4	5	6
Junior totals				7	2	6	8	4
Senior totals				14	3	4	7	6

== Awards and honors ==
Award	Year
OHL
Jack Ferguson Award	2010
All-Rookie Team	2011
Montreal Canadiens
Molson Cup	2016

== Notes ==
Awards and achievements
Preceded by Nathan Beaulieu	Montreal Canadiens first-round draft pick 2012	Succeeded by Michael McCarron
