= William Karlsson =

Swedish ice hockey player (born 1993)

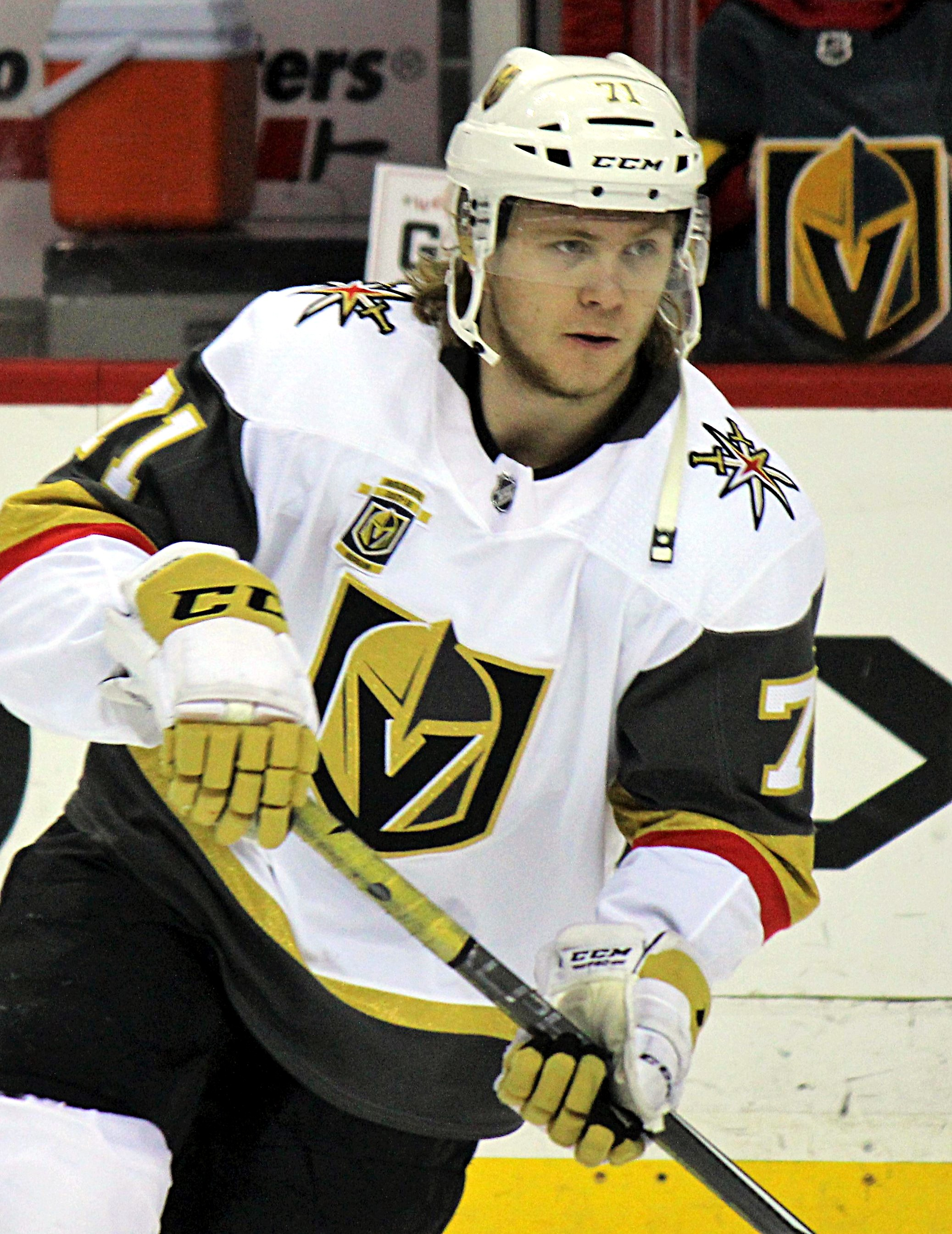
- Karlsson with the Vegas Golden Knights in 2018
- Born: 8 January 1993 (age 33) Märsta, Sweden
- Height: 6 ft 1 in (185 cm)
- Weight: 190 lb (86 kg; 13 st 8 lb)
- Position: Forward
- Shoots: Left
- NHL team Former teams: Vegas Golden Knights; HV71; Anaheim Ducks; Columbus Blue Jackets
- National team: Sweden
- NHL draft: 53rd overall, 2011; Anaheim Ducks
- Playing career: 2011–present

Lars William Karlsson (born 8 January 1993), nicknamed "Wild Bill", is a Swedish professional ice hockey player who is a forward and alternate captain for the Vegas Golden Knights of the National Hockey League (NHL). He was drafted in the second round, 53rd overall, by the Anaheim Ducks in the 2011 NHL entry draft. In addition to playing for Vegas, Karlsson has also played in the NHL for Anaheim and the Columbus Blue Jackets.

After being selected by the Golden Knights in the 2017 NHL expansion draft, Karlsson has been one of the key points of the team offense, and helped Vegas reach the Stanley Cup Final in their inaugural season. During his first season in Vegas, Karlsson scored a career-high 43 goals and became the franchise all-time leader in goals. In 2023, Karlsson won the Stanley Cup with Vegas, one of six original members of the Golden Knights to still be with the team for their first Stanley Cup win six years later.

== Playing career ==
=== Sweden ===
In the 2011–12 season, Karlsson finished in 12th place in Allsvenskan scoring after recording 45 points in 46 games, the second-most on his team. He made his senior Elitserien debut with HV71.

=== Anaheim Ducks and Columbus Blue Jackets ===
On 20 May 2013, Karlsson signed a three-year, entry-level contract with the NHL's Anaheim Ducks, the team that drafted him in the second round, 53rd overall, in the 2011 NHL entry draft. He was returned on loan to HV71 for the 2013–14 season.

Karlsson made his NHL debut on 11 October 2014 and scored his first and second NHL goals on 13 October against Michal Neuvirth of the Buffalo Sabres. He was reassigned to Anaheim's American Hockey League (AHL) affiliate, the Norfolk Admirals, on 24 November. Karlsson was reassigned between Norfolk and Anaheim for the remainder of the season, but finished the year in the AHL.

On 2 March 2015, Karlsson was traded to the Columbus Blue Jackets (along with Rene Bourque and a second-round draft pick in 2015) in exchange for James Wisniewski and a third-round pick in 2015.

=== Vegas Golden Knights ===
On 21 June 2017, having been left "exposed" by Columbus for the 2017 NHL expansion draft, Karlsson was selected by the first year expansion team Vegas Golden Knights. The Blue Jackets traded a first-round pick in 2017, a second-round pick in 2019 and injured forward David Clarkson to Vegas with the agreement that the Golden Knights would select Karlsson.

Karlsson spent the 2017–18 season (Vegas' first in the NHL) centering a line with Reilly Smith and Jonathan Marchessault. This proved to be a productive line, with all three putting up career-high offensive numbers. Karlsson scored his first career NHL hat-trick on 31 December 2017 against the Toronto Maple Leafs, it also being the first hat-trick in Golden Knights history. He scored his second career NHL hat-trick on 18 March 2018 against the Calgary Flames. In addition to providing 35 assists and an NHL-high plus-minus rating of +45, Karlsson ended the regular season with 43 goals, setting a new NHL record for goals scored by a player in an expansion team's inaugural season. His 43 goals placed him third in NHL scoring, behind Patrik Laine (44) and Alexander Ovechkin (49). Karlsson was also named a finalist for the Lady Byng Memorial Trophy for his high standard of play and sportsmanship. On 20 June, he was named the recipient of the trophy, becoming the first player since Wayne Gretzky to win an end-of-season award in their team's inaugural season in the NHL. Karlsson was also awarded the Guldpucken as the top Swedish ice hockey player in the 2017–18 season.

After his career-high season, on 4 August 2018, Karlsson signed a new one-year, $5.25 million contract with Vegas for the 2018–19 season. Karlsson described his decision to sign a one-year contract as "betting on [him]self a little" and that he would use the subsequent season to prove that his 2018–19 production "was no fluke".

On 24 June 2019, having produced 24 goals and 32 assists (56 points) in the 2018–19 season, Karlsson signed a new eight-year, $47.2 million contract with Vegas worth an average annual value of $5.9 million. The contract is effective from the 2019–20 season through to the end of the 2026–27 season.

By the 2022–23 season, Karlsson was one of six remaining original members of the Golden Knights, alongside Marchessault, Smith, Brayden McNabb, Shea Theodore and William Carrier. The team reached the Stanley Cup Final for the second time, winning the Cup over the Florida Panthers in five games. Karlsson and four of the other original Golden Knights started the decisive game five.

On 30 September 2026, Karlsson signed a two-year extension with Vegas, keeping him with the franchise through the 2028–29 season.

== Personal life ==
Karlsson is a supporter of Sweden's AIK sports club. As a child, his biggest dream was to play for AIK Football.

Karlsson and his wife, Emily Ferguson, have two sons.

== Career statistics ==
=== Regular season and playoffs ===
			Regular season					Playoffs
Season	Team	League	GP	G	A	Pts	PIM	GP	G	A	Pts	PIM
2007–08	Wings HC Arlanda	J18	5	2	7	9	4	—	—	—	—	—
2008–09	Wings HC Arlanda	J18	33	10	18	28	16	—	—	—	—	—
2009–10	VIK Västerås HK	J18	22	10	13	23	33	—	—	—	—	—
2009–10	VIK Västerås HK	J18 Allsv	17	13	8	21	29	—	—	—	—	—
2009–10	VIK Västerås HK	J20	6	0	1	1	2	2	0	1	1	0
2010–11	VIK Västerås HK	J18	5	2	4	6	6	—	—	—	—	—
2010–11	VIK Västerås HK	J18 Allsv	6	3	5	8	4	6	7	8	15	2
2010–11	VIK Västerås HK	J20	38	20	34	54	45	—	—	—	—	—
2010–11	VIK Västerås HK	Allsv	14	1	3	4	2	—	—	—	—	—
2011–12	VIK Västerås HK	Allsv	46	12	33	45	6	6	1	1	2	0
2011–12	VIK Västerås HK	J20	—	—	—	—	—	5	2	2	4	2
2012–13	HV71	SEL	50	4	24	28	12	5	0	2	2	0
2012–13	HV71	J20	—	—	—	—	—	2	2	2	4	2
2013–14	HV71	SHL	55	15	22	37	14	8	3	4	7	8
2013–14	Norfolk Admirals	AHL	9	2	7	9	6	8	1	2	3	2
2014–15	Anaheim Ducks	NHL	18	2	1	3	2	—	—	—	—	—
2014–15	Norfolk Admirals	AHL	35	7	14	21	2	—	—	—	—	—
2014–15	Springfield Falcons	AHL	15	0	0	0	0	—	—	—	—	—
2014–15	Columbus Blue Jackets	NHL	3	1	1	2	0	—	—	—	—	—
2015–16	Columbus Blue Jackets	NHL	81	9	11	20	6	—	—	—	—	—
2016–17	Columbus Blue Jackets	NHL	81	6	19	25	10	5	2	1	3	0
2017–18	Vegas Golden Knights	NHL	82	43	35	78	12	20	7	8	15	2
2018–19	Vegas Golden Knights	NHL	82	24	32	56	16	7	2	3	5	2
2019–20	Vegas Golden Knights	NHL	63	15	31	46	16	20	4	6	10	0
2020–21	Vegas Golden Knights	NHL	56	14	25	39	4	19	4	12	16	2
2021–22	Vegas Golden Knights	NHL	67	12	23	35	10	—	—	—	—	—
2022–23	Vegas Golden Knights	NHL	82	14	39	53	10	22	11	6	17	2
2023–24	Vegas Golden Knights	NHL	70	30	30	60	22	7	0	2	2	0
2024–25	Vegas Golden Knights	NHL	53	9	20	29	4	11	3	3	6	0
2025–26	Vegas Golden Knights	NHL	14	4	3	7	4	15	3	6	9	4
SHL totals			105	19	46	65	26	13	3	6	9	8
NHL totals			752	183	270	453	116	126	36	47	83	12

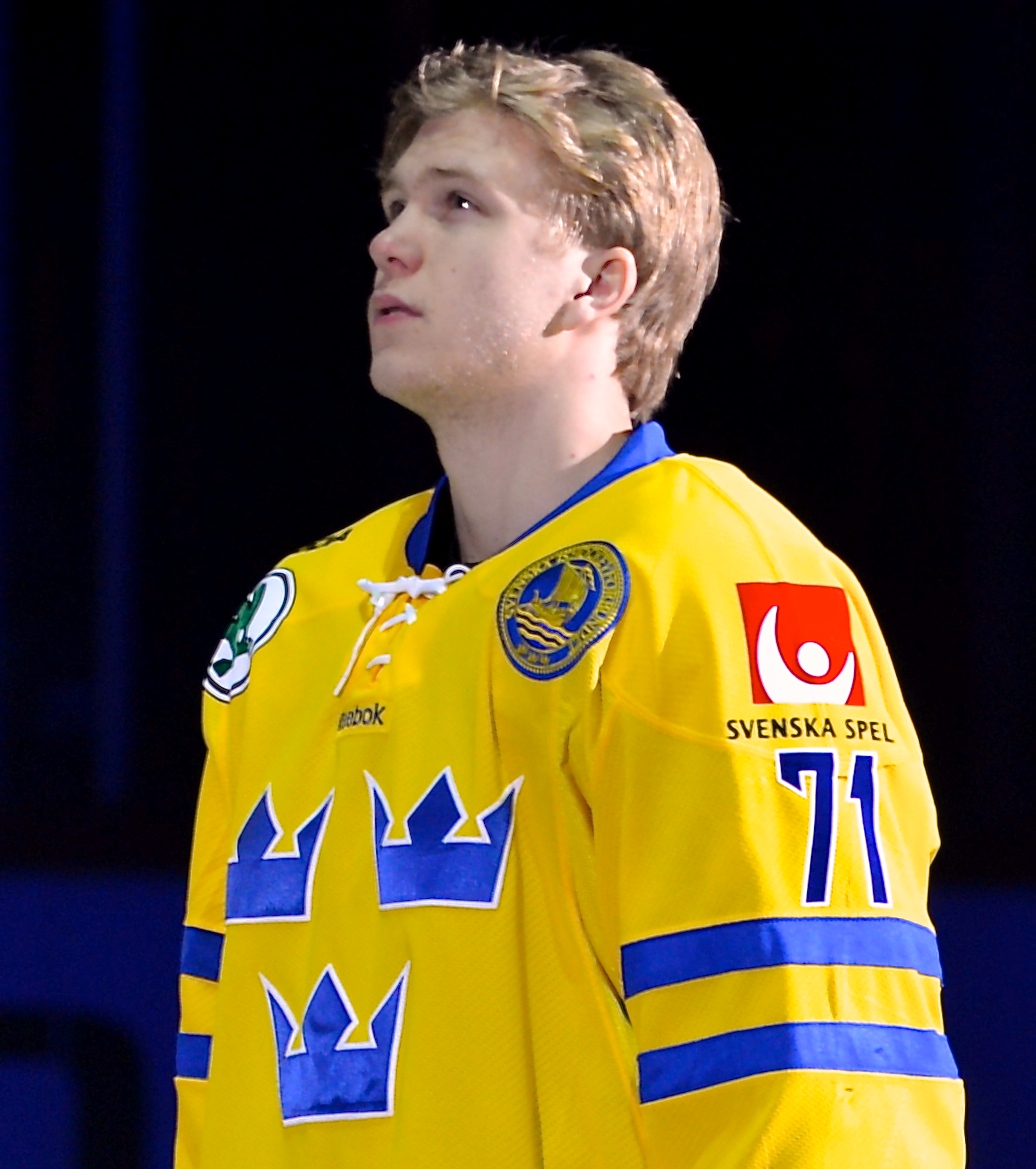

Medal record

Representing Sweden

Ice hockey

World Championships
Gold medal – first place	2017 Germany/France	
Bronze medal – third place	2025 Sweden/Denmark	

World Junior Championships
Gold medal – first place	2012 Calgary	
Silver medal – second place	2013 Ufa	

World U18 Championships
Silver medal – second place	2011 Germany	

=== International ===
Year	Team	Event	Result	GP	G	A	Pts	PIM
2011	Sweden	U18	2nd place, silver medalist(s)	6	2	3	5	6
2012	Sweden	WJC	1st place, gold medalist(s)	6	1	1	2	0
2013	Sweden	WJC	2nd place, silver medalist(s)	6	0	2	2	2
2017	Sweden	WC	1st place, gold medalist(s)	10	1	2	3	0
2025	Sweden	WC	3rd place, bronze medalist(s)	4	0	1	1	0
Junior totals				18	3	6	9	8
Senior totals				14	1	3	4	0

== Awards and honours ==
Award	Year	Ref
SHL
SHL Rookie of the Year	2013	
Guldpucken	2018	
NHL
Lady Byng Memorial Trophy	2018	
Viking Award	2018	
Stanley Cup champion	2023	

=== Records ===
- Holds the NHL record for most goals scored (43) by a single player in an expansion team's inaugural season (previously Brian Bradley with Tampa Bay (42) from 1993–2018).

Awards and achievements
Preceded by Johan Larsson	Winner of the SHL Rookie of the Year award 2013	Succeeded by Andreas Johnsson
Preceded by Johnny Gaudreau	Lady Byng Memorial Trophy; 2018	Succeeded by Aleksander Barkov
