= Deryk Engelland =

Canadian ice hockey player (born 1982)

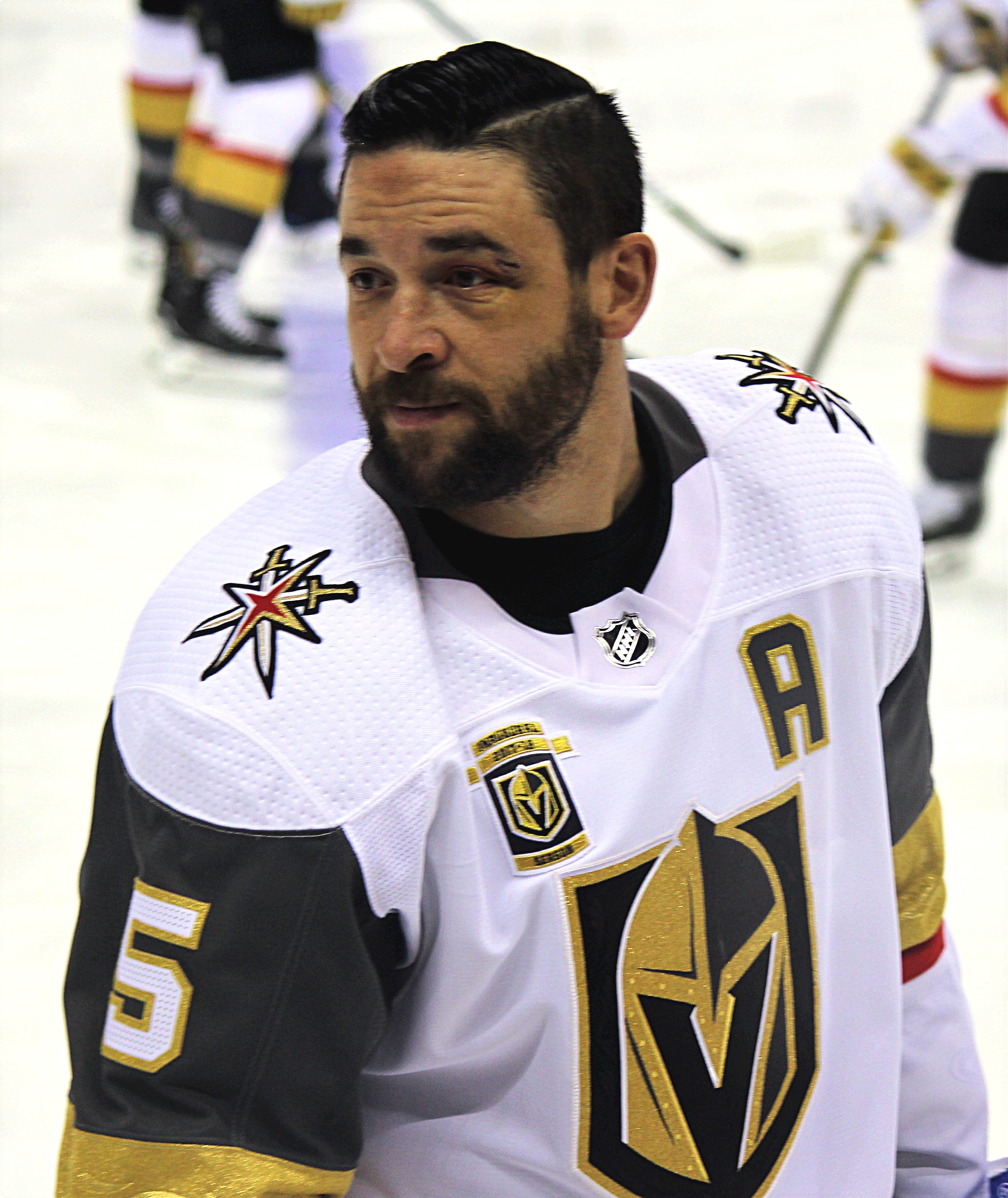
- Engelland with the Vegas Golden Knights in February 2018
- Born: April 3, 1982 (age 44) Edmonton, Alberta, Canada
- Height: 6 ft 2 in (188 cm)
- Weight: 214 lb (97 kg; 15 st 4 lb)
- Position: Defence
- Shot: Right
- Played for: Pittsburgh Penguins; Calgary Flames; Vegas Golden Knights
- NHL draft: 194th overall, 2000; New Jersey Devils
- Playing career: 2003–2020

Deryk Engelland (born April 3, 1982) is a Canadian former professional ice hockey defenseman. Engelland played for the Pittsburgh Penguins, Calgary Flames and Vegas Golden Knights over his eleven-season career in the National Hockey League (NHL). Throughout his career, Engelland was best known for his physical play and fighting abilities.

Engelland was selected in the sixth round, 194th pick overall, by the New Jersey Devils at the 2000 NHL entry draft. He made his NHL debut with the Penguins in 2009 after six years in the minor leagues.

== Playing career ==
=== Early career ===
Engelland played five seasons of junior hockey in the Western Hockey League (WHL) for the Moose Jaw Warriors. He appeared in two games in 1998–99 before establishing a place as a regular defenceman for the team in the following four seasons where he peaked at 17 points in 2001–02 and 199 penalty minutes in 2002–03. The New Jersey Devils selected Engelland in the sixth round, 194th overall at the 2000 NHL entry draft, but never played with the team. He turned professional in 2003–04 and split that season between the Las Vegas Wranglers of the ECHL and the Lowell Lock Monsters of the American Hockey League (AHL).

Returning to Las Vegas, Engelland played the entire 2004–05 season in the ECHL where he scored 5 goals, added 16 assists and recorded 138 penalty minutes. He then spent the following several seasons shuffling between the ECHL and AHL. 2005–06 was split between the South Carolina Stingrays and Hershey Bears, and the following year between Hershey and the Reading Royals. His play with Hershey in the 2007 Calder Cup playoffs caught the attention of the NHL's Pittsburgh Penguins who signed him to a contract. Engelland joined the Wilkes-Barre/Scranton Penguins for the 2007–08 AHL season where he played all 80 regular season games then added 23 more in the playoffs as the team reached the Calder Cup final. He again played all 80 games for Wilkes-Barre/Scranton in 2008–09. After starting the 2009–10 season with the AHL club, Engelland reached a consecutive games played streak of 171 that was broken following a game played November 6, 2009, when he earned his first recall to Pittsburgh.

=== Pittsburgh Penguins (2007–2014) ===
"The good thing about Deryk is, he knows his game really well. He's a simple defenseman with the puck. Makes the first pass. Makes the good, hard plays. He's a tough customer, tough to play against in the defensive zone, but also an intimidating guy with the brand of hockey he can play."

— Penguins coach Dan Bylsma describes Engelland's playing style in November 2009

After more than six years in the minor leagues, the 27-year-old Engelland made his NHL debut on November 10, 2009, against the Boston Bruins. He played a total of nine games with Pittsburgh and recorded two assists. With Wilkes-Barre/Scranton, he appeared in 71 games and scored 11 points.

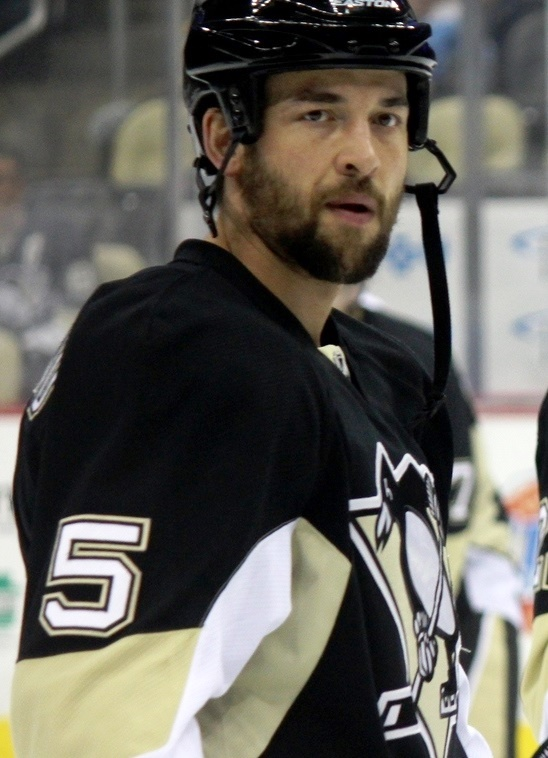
Engelland with the Penguins during warmups in March 2014

Engelland praised the Penguins for their efforts to develop his skills as a physical defenceman; he played his first full NHL season came in 2010–11. Engelland appeared in 63 games for the Penguins and scored his first NHL goal on November 12, 2010, against the Tampa Bay Lightning. During the season, the Penguins signed Engelland to a three-year contract extension through the 2013–14 season and which paid him an average of $566,700 per season.

On December 20, 2011, Engelland delivered a hit to the head of Chicago Blackhawks forward Marcus Krüger, who suffered a concussion as a result, resulting in a three game suspension for Engelland. He ended the 2011–12 playing in 73 games for Pittsburgh and improved to 4 goals and 13 assists for 17 points.

When a labour dispute delayed the start of the 2012–13 NHL season, Engelland opted to sign with Rosenborg IHK in Norway's GET-ligaen. He played 15 games for Rosenborg where he recorded 9 points before returning to Pittsburgh when the NHL resumed operation. In 42 games with the Penguins, Engelland had 6 assists.

In his fourth NHL season, 2013–14, Engelland posted a career high of six goals (and added six assists) in a campaign where the Penguins occasionally played him at forward. Though a regular in the Penguins line-up, Engelland was typically used in limited role.

=== Calgary Flames (2014–2017) ===
Engelland opted to leave the Penguins following the season and signed a three-year, $8.7 million contract with the Calgary Flames, where he hoped to earn expanded responsibilities with the rebuilding team. The contract was for $2.9 million per season, a five-fold increase over his previous salary which was criticized as being among the worst value contracts signed during the 2014 free agency period.

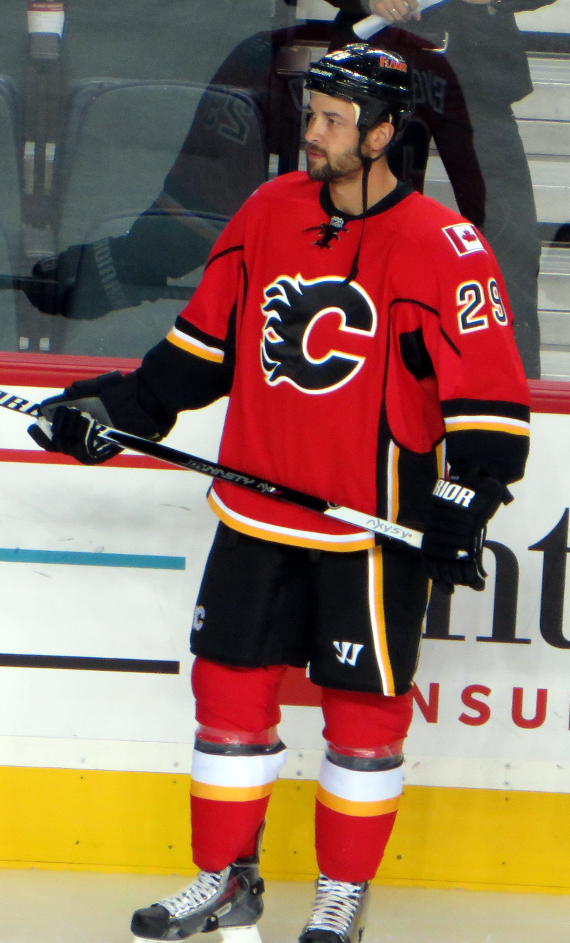
Engelland with the Flames in October 2014

However at the start of 2017 Engelland was made alternate captain of the Flames during the absence of Troy Brouwer, who was on injured reserve with a broken finger.

=== Vegas Golden Knights (2017–2020) ===
As an impending free agent following the 2016–17 season, his third season with the Flames, Engelland was left exposed at the 2017 NHL expansion draft. Engelland, a resident of Las Vegas, was selected by the Vegas Golden Knights on June 21, 2017. Engelland immediately signed a one-year, $1 million deal with the Golden Knights, marking his return to professional hockey in the city. On January 15, 2018, the Golden Knights signed Engelland to a one-year, $1.5 million extension through the 2018–19 season. On April 23, 2018, Engelland was nominated by the Knights for the King Clancy Memorial Trophy as a player who best exemplifies leadership qualities and gives back to his community although he would not be named a top three finalist by the league. The following day, Engelland was also named a finalist for the Mark Messier Leadership Award, which he won on June 20.

On July 23, 2019, the Golden Knights re-signed Engelland to a one-year, $700,000 contract extension.

As an original member of the Golden Knights for three seasons, Engelland announced his retirement from professional hockey after 11 NHL seasons on December 22, 2020. He remained with the Golden Knights, transitioning to the club's Foundation and serving as the Special Assistant to the Owner.

== Personal life ==
Engelland was born April 3, 1982, in Edmonton, Alberta. His father is a welder by trade, and the family moved frequently in his early life as he lived in the Edmonton-area communities of Leduc and Mayerthorpe before settling in Chetwynd, British Columbia. He met his wife Melissa while playing in the minors in Las Vegas, where the couple continue to live with their sons. Since his retirement, Engelland has been a part of the Golden Knights’ television broadcast team, providing analysis during pregame, intermission, and postgame shows.

== Career statistics ==
			Regular season					Playoffs
Season	Team	League	GP	G	A	Pts	PIM	GP	G	A	Pts	PIM
1998–99	Sicamous Eagles	KIJHL	51	6	21	27	90	—	—	—	—	—
1998–99	Moose Jaw Warriors	WHL	2	0	0	0	0	—	—	—	—	—
1999–00	Moose Jaw Warriors	WHL	55	0	5	5	62	4	0	0	0	0
2000–01	Moose Jaw Warriors	WHL	65	4	11	15	157	4	0	0	0	10
2001–02	Moose Jaw Warriors	WHL	56	7	10	17	102	12	0	2	2	27
2002–03	Moose Jaw Warriors	WHL	65	3	8	11	199	13	1	1	2	20
2003–04	Las Vegas Wranglers	ECHL	35	2	11	13	63	2	0	0	0	0
2003–04	Lowell Lock Monsters	AHL	26	0	0	0	34	—	—	—	—	—
2004–05	Las Vegas Wranglers	ECHL	72	5	16	21	138	—	—	—	—	—
2005–06	South Carolina Stingrays	ECHL	35	3	13	16	20	—	—	—	—	—
2005–06	Hershey Bears	AHL	37	0	4	4	77	1	0	0	0	0
2006–07	Hershey Bears	AHL	44	4	6	10	95	14	0	0	0	14
2006–07	Reading Royals	ECHL	6	0	3	3	8	—	—	—	—	—
2007–08	Wilkes–Barre/Scranton Penguins	AHL	80	2	15	17	141	23	1	3	4	14
2008–09	Wilkes–Barre/Scranton Penguins	AHL	80	3	11	14	143	12	0	2	2	6
2009–10	Wilkes–Barre/Scranton Penguins	AHL	71	5	6	11	121	4	0	1	1	7
2009–10	Pittsburgh Penguins	NHL	9	0	2	2	17	—	—	—	—	—
2010–11	Pittsburgh Penguins	NHL	63	3	7	10	123	—	—	—	—	—
2011–12	Pittsburgh Penguins	NHL	73	4	13	17	56	6	0	1	1	14
2012–13	Rosenborg IHK	NOR	15	1	8	9	43	—	—	—	—	—
2012–13	Pittsburgh Penguins	NHL	42	0	6	6	54	7	0	0	0	8
2013–14	Pittsburgh Penguins	NHL	56	6	6	12	58	—	—	—	—	—
2014–15	Calgary Flames	NHL	76	2	9	11	53	11	0	1	1	50
2015–16	Calgary Flames	NHL	69	3	9	12	54	—	—	—	—	—
2016–17	Calgary Flames	NHL	81	4	12	16	85	4	0	0	0	2
2017–18	Vegas Golden Knights	NHL	79	5	18	23	24	20	0	2	2	26
2018–19	Vegas Golden Knights	NHL	74	2	10	12	18	7	0	1	1	8
2019–20	Vegas Golden Knights	NHL	49	1	5	6	37	—	—	—	—	—
NHL totals			671	30	97	127	579	55	0	5	5	108
AHL totals			338	14	42	56	611	54	1	6	7	41

== Awards and honours ==
Award	Year
AHL
Calder Cup (Hershey Bears)	2006
NHL
Mark Messier Leadership Award	2018
