= Max Pacioretty =

American ice hockey player (born 1988)

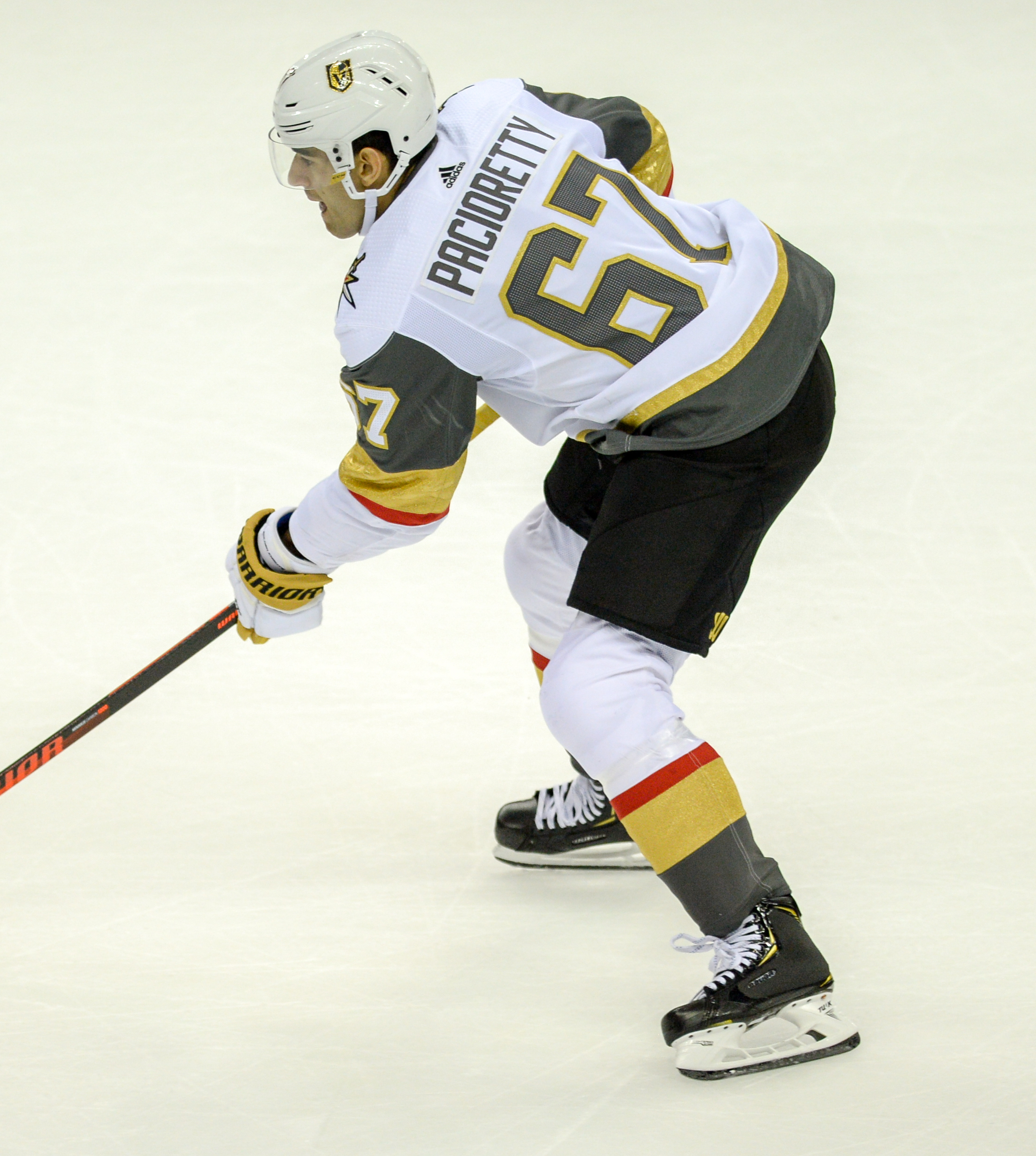
- Pacioretty with the Vegas Golden Knights in October 2018
- Born: November 20, 1988 (age 38) New Canaan, Connecticut, U.S.
- Height: 6 ft 2 in (188 cm)
- Weight: 217 lb (98 kg; 15 st 7 lb)
- Position: Left wing
- Shot: Left
- Played for: Montreal Canadiens; HC Ambrì-Piotta; Vegas Golden Knights; Carolina Hurricanes; Washington Capitals; Toronto Maple Leafs
- National team: United States
- NHL draft: 22nd overall, 2007; Montreal Canadiens
- Playing career: 2008–2025

Maximillian Kolenda Pacioretty (born November 20, 1988) is an American former professional ice hockey left winger.

Pacioretty was drafted in the first round, 22nd overall, in the 2007 NHL entry draft by the Montreal Canadiens; he would go on to captain them for his last three seasons with Montreal and score 30 or more goals in five of the seasons with Montreal. He was traded to the Vegas Golden Knights before the 2018–19 NHL season; although the move revitalized his career, he was dealt to the Carolina Hurricanes four seasons later due to the Golden Knights' salary cap complications. After only five games in Carolina, he would later play single seasons for the Washington Capitals and Toronto Maple Leafs before retiring in 2025.

== Playing career ==
=== Amateur ===
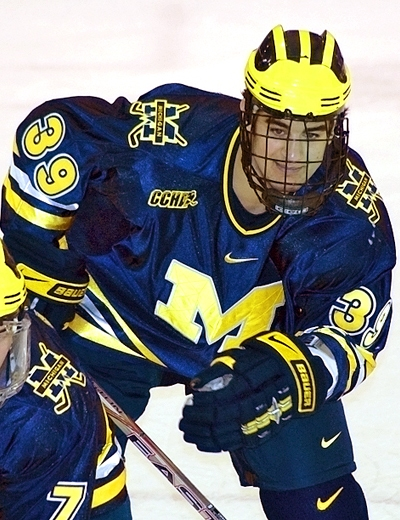
Pacioretty playing for the University of Michigan in March 2008

As a youth, Pacioretty played in the 2002 Quebec International Pee-Wee Hockey Tournament with the New York Rangers minor ice hockey team.

Pacioretty played high school hockey at New Canaan High School in which he led the state in points during his freshman year, and then moved on to The Taft School in Watertown, Connecticut. Pacioretty then played junior hockey for the Sioux City Musketeers of the United States Hockey League (USHL) for one season in 2006–07. Following the campaign, Pacioretty was selected in the first round, 22nd overall by the Montreal Canadiens during the 2007 NHL entry draft; the pick had been previously acquired by the Canadiens in a trade with the San Jose Sharks. He spent the 2007–08 season with the University of Michigan, recording 15 goals and 38 points in 36 games.

On July 17, 2008, Pacioretty signed a three-year, entry-level contract with the Canadiens.

=== Professional (2008–2025) ===
==== Montreal Canadiens (2008–2018) ====
Pacioretty made his NHL debut with the Canadiens on January 2, 2009, scoring his first NHL goal on his first NHL shot in a 4–1 loss against the New Jersey Devils. Upon his debut, he also became the first player in Montreal's lengthy franchise history to wear sweater number 67.

After starting the 2010–11 season playing for the Hamilton Bulldogs of the American Hockey League (AHL), the Canadiens' top minor league affiliate, Pacioretty was recalled for the second time to the NHL on December 12, 2010.

On March 8, 2011, Pacioretty suffered an injury following a hit by Boston Bruins defenseman Zdeno Chára. The force and location of the hit resulted in Pacioretty colliding with the stanchion at the end of the bench. He was taken off the ice on a stretcher after lying motionless on the ice for several minutes. The extent of the injury was revealed the next day as a 4th cervical vertebrae (C4) fracture and a grade 2 concussion. One Bruin, Mark Recchi, questioned the severity of the concussion during an interview stating that Pacioretty was at a movie theater four days after the incident. For delivering the hit, Chára received a five-minute major penalty and a game misconduct, and after reviewing videotape of the play the NHL decided no further punishment was warranted. However, a criminal investigation was announced by the Montreal Police Service. Additionally, Air Canada threatened to remove its League sponsorship if the NHL did not take any action to prevent further violence on ice. For Pacioretty's part, he could not remember the incident, but after seeing the tape said that he was "disgusted" that there was no fine or suspension. About two months later, he said that he thought Chára regretted his actions and that he forgave him.

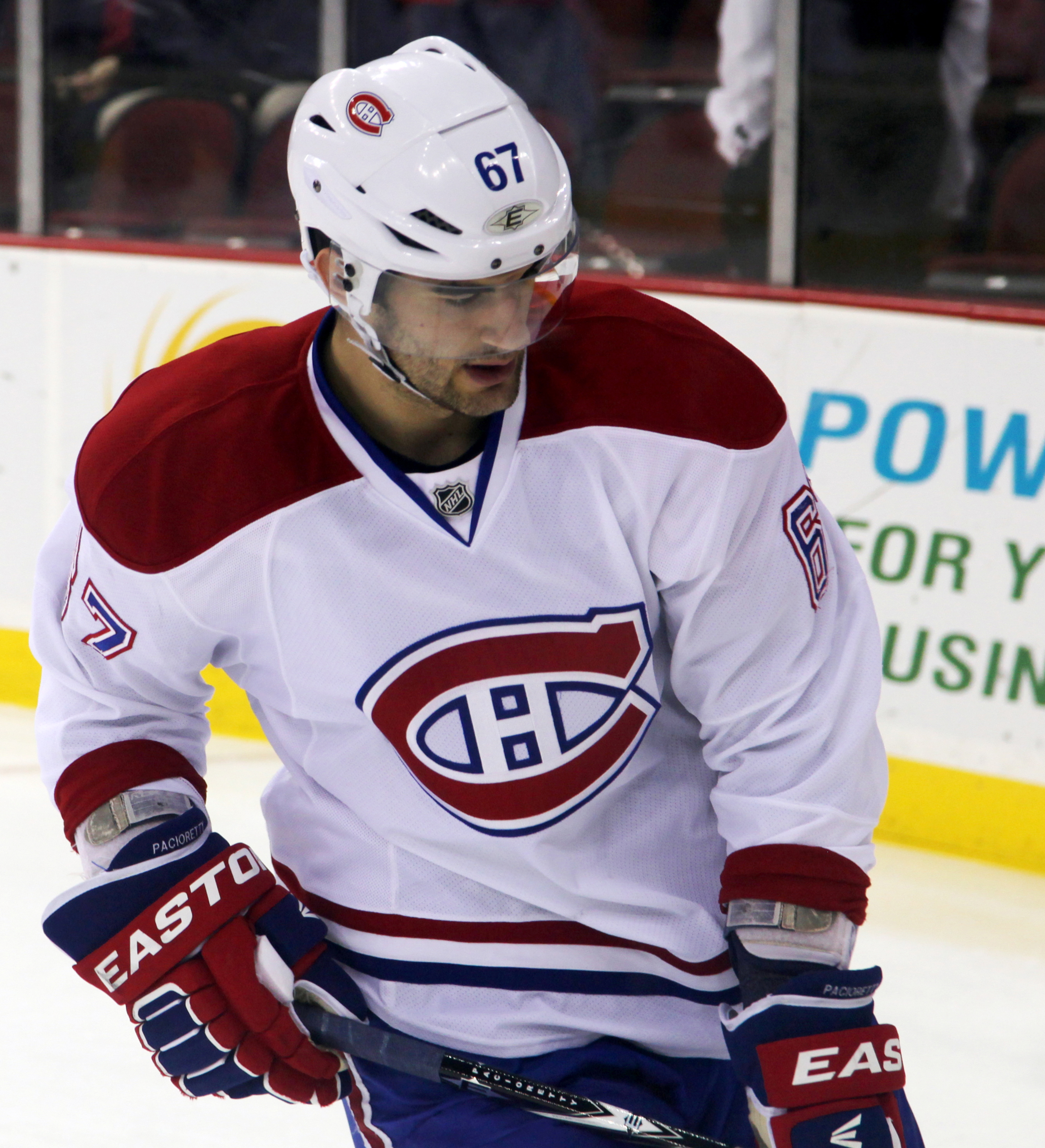
Pacioretty with Montreal in February 2012

Pacioretty recovered in time to start the 2011–12 season with the Canadiens. On November 26, 2011, Pacioretty delivered an illegal check to the head of Kris Letang and received a three-game suspension. Pacioretty would end the season as the team's points leader, finishing with a career-high 33 goals and 32 assists for 65 points in 79 games, also winning the Bill Masterton Memorial Trophy for "perseverance, sportsmanship and dedication to hockey." He recorded his first career hat-trick on February 9, 2012, against the New York Islanders.

On August 12, 2012, Pacioretty signed a six-year, $27 million contract extension with the Canadiens. In September 2012, as a result of the impending labor lockout, he signed a contract to play overseas with Swiss National League A team HC Ambrì-Piotta.

On February 6, 2014, Pacioretty became the first Canadien to have two penalty shots awarded in the same game, against the Vancouver Canucks and goaltender Roberto Luongo, also becoming just the second player in NHL history to be awarded two penalty shots in the same period. These were his second and third NHL career penalty shots, the first occurring earlier in the season on October 12, 2013, coincidentally also against the Canucks and Luongo. Pacioretty missed all three penalty shots, but nonetheless still scored a hat trick in the February 6 game.

On September 15, 2014, Pacioretty was named an alternate captain of the Canadiens along with P. K. Subban, Tomáš Plekanec and Andrei Markov.

On September 18, 2015, Pacioretty was voted by the team to become the 29th captain in Canadiens history after going without a captain in the 2014–15 season with the departure of Brian Gionta.

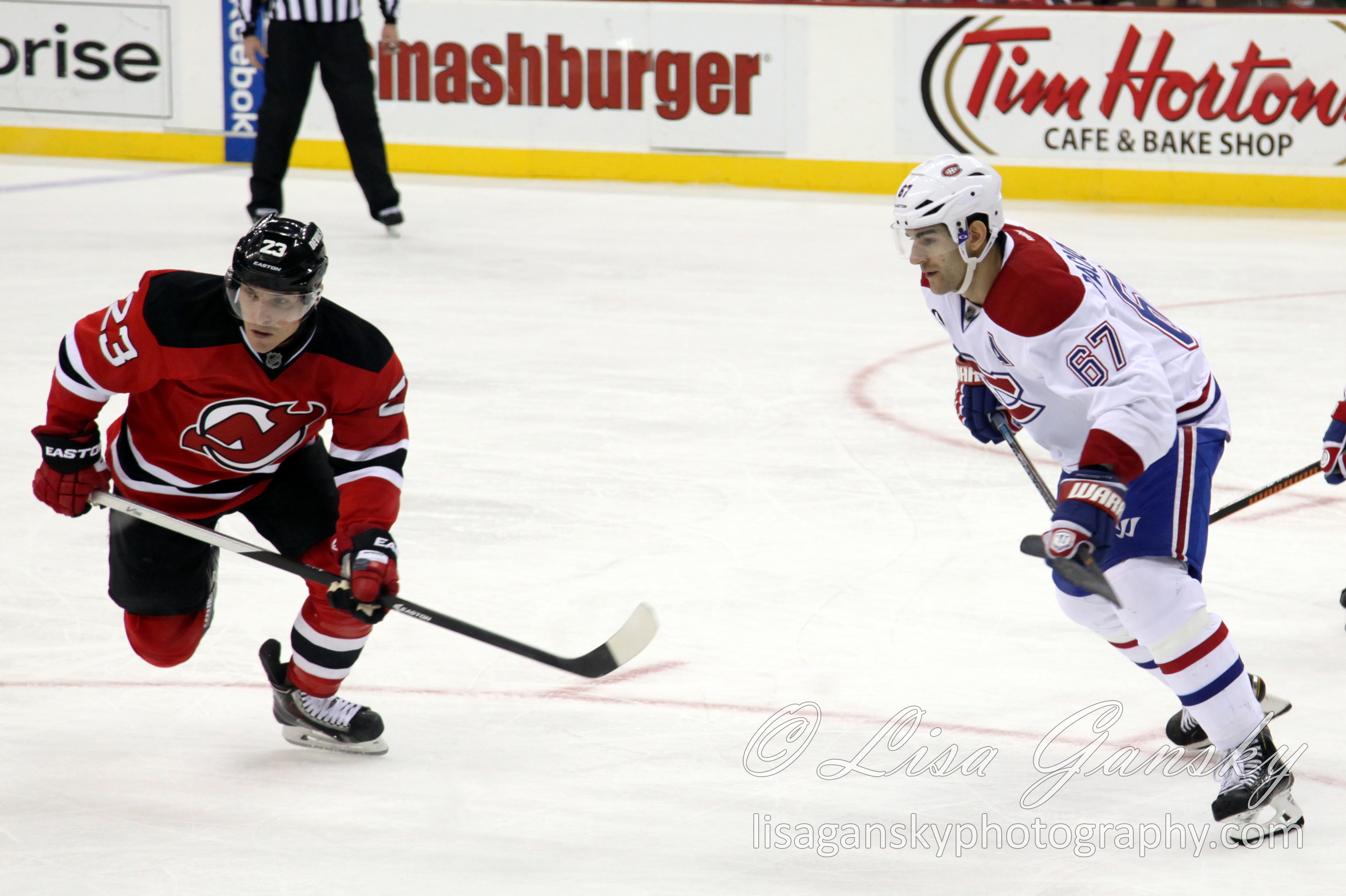
Pacioretty in a game against the New Jersey Devils in January 2015. He was named as an alternate captain for the Montreal Canadiens at the start of the 2014–15 season.

The 2017–18 season was disappointing for the Canadiens, who finished 28th overall in the NHL standings. After four-straight 60+ point seasons, Pacioretty recorded only 37 total points over the season. On March 2, 2018, Pacioretty left a game against the New York Islanders due to an injury, and a few days later it was announced that Pacioretty suffered a knee injury and was set to be out for four to six weeks.

The summer prior to his contract ending, there was speculation the Canadiens were intending to trade Pacioretty. There was a trade in place to send Pacioretty to the Los Angeles Kings during the 2018 NHL entry draft, but Pacioretty rejected the trade. He subsequently switched agents. Pacioretty confirmed in late August that he hadn't engaged in extensions talks with the club, signaling that the final year of his contract could also be the final year of his tenure with the Canadiens.

==== Vegas Golden Knights (2018–2022) ====
On September 10, 2018, Pacioretty was traded to the Vegas Golden Knights in exchange for Tomáš Tatar, Nick Suzuki, and a 2019 second round draft pick. He subsequently signed a four-year, $28 million contract extension with the Golden Knights.

Pacioretty made his return to Montreal on November 10, 2018. Prior to the game, the Canadiens aired a video tribute for him, while he received a standing ovation from the fans. Pacioretty recorded nine shots in a 5–4 loss. He would finish the season with 22 goals and 18 assists, and add another five goals and six assists during the Golden Knights' seven-game opening round loss to the San Jose Sharks in the 2019 Stanley Cup playoffs.

Over the course of four seasons with the Golden Knights, Pacioretty scored 97 goals, forming a key part of the team's offense. In the 2021–22 season he was hampered with a broken wrist and foot, playing only 39 games.

==== Carolina Hurricanes (2022–2023) ====
On July 13, 2022, with the Golden Knights in need of salary cap space, Pacioretty and prospect Dylan Coghlan were traded to the Carolina Hurricanes for future considerations.

Just weeks into his tenure with Carolina, Pacioretty suffered a torn Achilles tendon during an offseason workout, necessitating surgery, and ruling him out for the first several months of the 2022–23 season. He made his Hurricanes on-ice debut on January 5, 2023 in a 5-3 loss to the Nashville Predators and scored two goals in his second game on January 7, 2023 in a 5-4 shootout loss to the Columbus Blue Jackets. Pacioretty played only five games with the team before sustaining a second Achilles tear on January 19 in a game against the Minnesota Wild, effectively ending his season.

==== Washington Capitals (2023–2024) ====
In concluding his contract with the Hurricanes, Pacioretty agreed to a one-year incentive based contract up to $4 million with the Washington Capitals on the opening day of free agency for the 2023–24 season on July 1, 2023. Pacioretty again missed some time due to his second Achilles tendon injury, not debuting with Washington until January 3, 2024, and reportedly contemplated retirement in the time leading up to his debut. With the Capitals middling as the NHL trade deadline approached, rumors began to circulate that Pacioretty may waive his no-move clause to be sent to a playoff contender. Ultimately, Pacioretty refused to waive his no-movement clause despite several trade offers, saying he wanted to 'finish what [he] started' by remaining in Washington. Despite a modest team point total and a season goal differential of minus-37, the Capitals clinched a playoff spot in the eighth and final seed, though were ultimately swept in the first round by the Presidents' Trophy-winning New York Rangers. Playing in all games since his debut, Pacioretty appeared in 47 games with the club and all four playoff appearances, contributing 23 regular season points and an additional assist in the post-season.

==== Toronto Maple Leafs and retirement (2024–2025) ====
Unsigned for the 2024 offseason, rumors began to circulate in late August that Pacioretty was connected to the Toronto Maple Leafs organization, who were looking to bolster depth on their left wing. On September 11, the team formally announced that Pacioretty had been signed to a professional try-out to attend Maple Leafs training camp ahead of the season. Following the conclusion of the team's preseason, Pacioretty signed a one-year, $873,770 contract with the Maple Leafs on October 7, 2024, with an additional $626,230 in collective games-played bonuses if Pacioretty appears in 10 and 35 games respectively during the regular season.

Starting the season with the Maple Leafs, Pacioretty would score the team's first goal of the 2024–25 season in a 4–2 win over the New Jersey Devils on October 10. Appearing largely in a bottom-six role for the team, Pacioretty would surprise many with strong play in the post-season, in which he recorded 8 points in 13 games and was the fourth highest scoring Maple Leafs player in the playoffs.

Following the conclusion of the season, Pacioretty hinted at retirement, saying that it was difficult to be away from his family while playing. He ultimately opted to retire, confirmed after taking a position with the coaching staff at his alma mater of Michigan in September 2025.

== Personal life ==
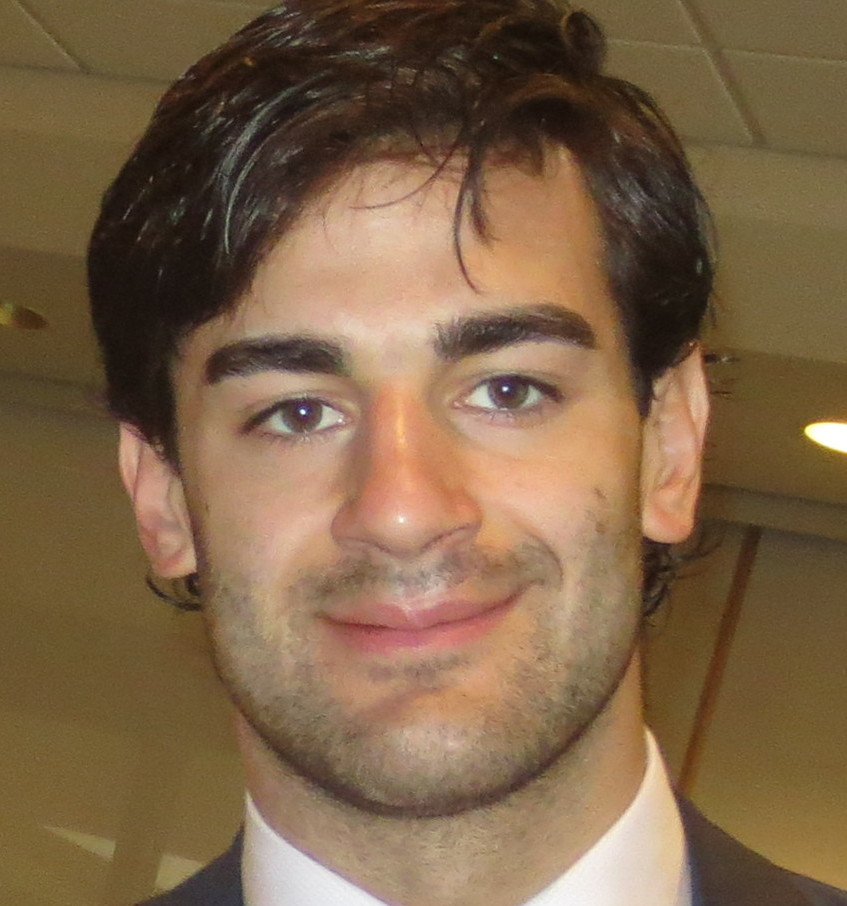
Pacioretty in April 2015

Pacioretty is the brother-in-law of former NHL player Maxim Afinogenov; Pacioretty married Afinogenov's sister, Katia, in July 2011. The couple have four sons and one daughter.

Pacioretty's paternal grandmother, Theresa Pacioretty (née Savoie) is a French-Canadian from Montreal. Pacioretty's mother is of Mexican origin. Having grown up in Mexico, she was not familiar with ice skating but given Pacioretty's very high energy as a child, took him to a rink to expend energy. The family of Pacioretty's paternal grandfather Burton hails from the Province of Varese in Lombardy, Italy, particularly the towns of Ferno, Gallarate, and Cardano al Campo. Pacioretty's great grandfather, Giuseppe Paccioretti, immigrated to the United States in 1902.

In March 2015, McDonald's introduced the "Max 67" burger which was only available in its Quebec restaurants.

== Career statistics ==
=== Regular season and playoffs ===
			Regular season					Playoffs
Season	Team	League	GP	G	A	Pts	PIM	GP	G	A	Pts	PIM
2004–05	Taft School	HS–Prep	23	5	14	19	—	—	—	—	—	—
2005–06	Taft School	HS–Prep	26	7	26	33	—	—	—	—	—	—
2006–07	Sioux City Musketeers	USHL	60	21	42	63	119	7	4	6	10	10
2007–08	University of Michigan	CCHA	36	15	23	38	59	—	—	—	—	—
2008–09	Hamilton Bulldogs	AHL	37	6	23	29	43	—	—	—	—	—
2008–09	Montreal Canadiens	NHL	34	3	8	11	27	—	—	—	—	—
2009–10	Montreal Canadiens	NHL	52	3	11	14	20	—	—	—	—	—
2009–10	Hamilton Bulldogs	AHL	18	2	9	11	10	5	1	0	1	2
2010–11	Hamilton Bulldogs	AHL	27	17	15	32	20	—	—	—	—	—
2010–11	Montreal Canadiens	NHL	37	14	10	24	39	—	—	—	—	—
2011–12	Montreal Canadiens	NHL	79	33	32	65	56	—	—	—	—	—
2012–13	HC Ambrì–Piotta	NLA	5	1	0	1	4	—	—	—	—	—
2012–13	Montreal Canadiens	NHL	44	15	24	39	28	4	0	0	0	4
2013–14	Montreal Canadiens	NHL	73	39	21	60	35	17	5	6	11	8
2014–15	Montreal Canadiens	NHL	80	37	30	67	32	11	5	2	7	16
2015–16	Montreal Canadiens	NHL	82	30	34	64	34	—	—	—	—	—
2016–17	Montreal Canadiens	NHL	81	35	32	67	38	6	0	1	1	7
2017–18	Montreal Canadiens	NHL	64	17	20	37	30	—	—	—	—	—
2018–19	Vegas Golden Knights	NHL	66	22	18	40	36	7	5	6	11	4
2019–20	Vegas Golden Knights	NHL	71	32	34	66	44	16	5	3	8	12
2020–21	Vegas Golden Knights	NHL	48	24	27	51	14	13	5	6	11	4
2021–22	Vegas Golden Knights	NHL	39	19	18	37	33	—	—	—	—	—
2022–23	Carolina Hurricanes	NHL	5	3	0	3	2	—	—	—	—	—
2023–24	Washington Capitals	NHL	47	4	19	23	25	4	0	1	1	2
2024–25	Toronto Maple Leafs	NHL	37	5	8	13	16	13	3	5	8	4
NHL totals			939	335	346	681	509	89	28	30	58	61

=== International ===
Year	Team	Event	Result	GP	G	A	Pts	PIM
2008	United States	WJC	4th	6	0	0	0	8
2012	United States	WC	7th	8	2	10	12	4
2014	United States	OG	4th	5	0	1	1	4
2016	United States	WCH	7th	3	0	0	0	2
Junior totals				6	0	0	0	8
Senior totals				16	2	11	13	10

== Awards and honors ==
Award	Year
College
All-CCHA Rookie Team	2008
NHL
Bill Masterton Memorial Trophy	2012
All-Star Game	2020

Awards and achievements
Preceded by Ryan McDonagh	Montreal Canadiens first-round draft pick 2007	Succeeded by Louis Leblanc
Preceded by Mark Letestu	CCHA Rookie of the Year; 2007–08	Succeeded by David Wohlberg
Preceded by Ian Laperrière	Winner of the Bill Masterton Memorial Trophy; 2011–12	Succeeded by Josh Harding
Preceded by Brian Gionta	Montreal Canadiens captain 2015–18	Succeeded by Shea Weber
