= 2019–20 Ottawa Senators season =

Season of professional ice hockey team

2019–20 Ottawa Senators
- Division: 7th Atlantic
- Conference: 15th Eastern
- 2019–20 record: 25–34–12
- Home record: 18–13–6
- Road record: 7–21–6
- Goals for: 191
- Goals against: 243

Team information
- General manager: Pierre Dorion
- Coach: D. J. Smith
- Captain: Vacant
- Alternate captains: Mark Borowiecki; Thomas Chabot (Feb. 24 – Mar. 11); Ron Hainsey; Jean-Gabriel Pageau (Oct. 2 – Feb. 24)
- Arena: Canadian Tire Centre
- Average attendance: 12,618
- Minor league affiliates: Belleville Senators (AHL); Brampton Beast (ECHL)

Team leaders
- Goals: Jean-Gabriel Pageau (24)
- Assists: Thomas Chabot (33)
- Points: Brady Tkachuk (44)
- Penalty minutes: Brady Tkachuk (106)
- Plus/minus: Ron Hainsey; Jean-Gabriel Pageau (+10)
- Wins: Craig Anderson (11)
- Goals against average: Marcus Hogberg (3.12)

The 2019–20 Ottawa Senators season was the 28th season of the Ottawa Senators of the National Hockey League (NHL). The Senators attempted to return to the playoffs after missing the playoffs in the past two seasons.

The season was suspended by the league officials on March 12, 2020, after several other professional and collegiate sports organizations followed suit as a result of the ongoing COVID-19 pandemic. On May 26, the NHL regular season was officially declared over with the remaining games being cancelled and the Senators missed the playoffs for the third straight year.

== Team business ==
On October 5, 2019, the Senators announced that Chris Phillips would have his jersey number (#4) retired by the team on February 18, 2020. He is the third Senators' player to have their jersey retired by the franchise, the others being Daniel Alfredsson's #11, and original Senator Frank Finnigan's #8.

The team named a new CEO in January 2020. The team had operated without a permanent one since 2018. Owner Eugene Melnyk had temporarily filled the post. The team named Jim Little who had served as executive VP and chief marketing and culture officer with Shaw Communications. Little was given the priority to repair community relations and boost ticket attendance among other business issues. Less than two months later, the Senators dismissed Little on March 4, 2020, and promised to announce a new CEO within a few weeks's time.

== Off-season ==
In May 2019, the Ottawa Senators announced that D. J. Smith agreed to a three-year contract to be the team's head coach. The team filled out the coaching staff by hiring associate coach Jack Capuano, assistant coach Davis Payne, assistant coach Bob Jones and video coach Mike King. Capuano and Payne are both former head coaches in the NHL. Goaltending coach Pierre Groulx was retained from the previous staff.

== Regular season ==
The Senators started their season with a 5–3 loss to the Toronto Maple Leafs on October 2. Scott Sabourin scored a goal in his NHL debut during the season opener.

Veteran player Bobby Ryan missed approximately three months while attending an NHL player assistance program. It was later revealed by Ryan that he had entered the program due to ongoing struggles with alcohol abuse. He would return to NHL action on February 25 in an away game versus the Nashville Predators. In his first post-rehab home game on February 27, Ryan made headlines by scoring his fifth career hat trick.

At the trade deadline in February 2020, the club continued to build for the future, trading away Dylan DeMelo, Jean-Gabriel Pageau, Vladislav Namestnikov and Tyler Ennis for draft picks. All were pending unrestricted free agents. After the trades, the Senators hold a total of 13 2020 NHL entry draft draft picks, including three in the first round and four in the second round.

The season was suspended by the NHL on March 12, 2020, after several other professional and collegiate sports organizations followed suit as a result of the ongoing COVID-19 pandemic. On March 17, it was announced that an unnamed Senators player had tested positive for the virus, the first case identified among NHL players. The team announced on March 21 that a second player has also tested positive.

== Standings ==
=== Divisional standings ===
Atlantic Division
Pos	Team	GP	W	L	OTL	RW	GF	GA	GD	Pts
1	p – Boston Bruins	70	44	14	12	38	227	174	+53	100
2	Tampa Bay Lightning	70	43	21	6	35	245	195	+50	92
3	Toronto Maple Leafs	70	36	25	9	28	238	227	+11	81
4	Florida Panthers	69	35	26	8	30	231	228	+3	78
5	Montreal Canadiens	71	31	31	9	19	212	221	−9	71
6	Buffalo Sabres	69	30	31	8	22	195	217	−22	68
7	Ottawa Senators	71	25	34	12	18	191	243	−52	62
8	Detroit Red Wings	71	17	49	5	13	145	267	−122	39

Source: National Hockey League
p – Clinched Presidents' Trophy

=== Eastern Conference ===
Pos	Team	GP	W	L	OTL	RW	GF	GA	GD	PCT	Qualification
1	Boston Bruins	70	44	14	12	38	227	174	+53	.714	Advance to Seeding round-robin tournament
2	Tampa Bay Lightning	70	43	21	6	35	245	195	+50	.657	Advance to Seeding round-robin tournament
3	Washington Capitals	69	41	20	8	31	240	215	+25	.652	Advance to Seeding round-robin tournament
4	Philadelphia Flyers	69	41	21	7	31	232	196	+36	.645	Advance to Seeding round-robin tournament
5	Pittsburgh Penguins	69	40	23	6	29	224	196	+28	.623	Advance to 2020 Stanley Cup playoffs qualifying round
6	Carolina Hurricanes	68	38	25	5	27	222	193	+29	.596	Advance to 2020 Stanley Cup playoffs qualifying round
7	New York Islanders	68	35	23	10	24	192	193	−1	.588	Advance to 2020 Stanley Cup playoffs qualifying round
8	Toronto Maple Leafs	70	36	25	9	28	238	227	+11	.579	Advance to 2020 Stanley Cup playoffs qualifying round
9	Columbus Blue Jackets	70	33	22	15	25	180	187	−7	.579	Advance to 2020 Stanley Cup playoffs qualifying round
10	Florida Panthers	69	35	26	8	30	231	228	+3	.565	Advance to 2020 Stanley Cup playoffs qualifying round
11	New York Rangers	70	37	28	5	31	234	222	+12	.564	Advance to 2020 Stanley Cup playoffs qualifying round
12	Montreal Canadiens	71	31	31	9	19	212	221	−9	.500	Advance to 2020 Stanley Cup playoffs qualifying round
13	Buffalo Sabres	69	30	31	8	22	195	217	−22	.493	
14	New Jersey Devils	69	28	29	12	22	189	230	−41	.493	
15	Ottawa Senators	71	25	34	12	18	191	243	−52	.437	
16	Detroit Red Wings	71	17	49	5	13	145	267	−122	.275	

Source: National Hockey League

== Schedule and results ==
=== Pre-season ===
The pre-season schedule was published on June 18, 2019.

2019 pre-season game log: 3–2–1 (Home: 1–1–0; Road: 2–1–1)
#	Date	Visitor	Score	Home	OT	Decision	Attendance	Record	Recap
1^{[a]}	September 17	Ottawa	3–1	Toronto		Hogberg	–	1–0–0
2	September 18	Toronto	3–4	Ottawa		Gustavsson	11,531	2–0–0
3	September 21	Montreal	4–0	Ottawa		Anderson	11,185	2–1–0
4^{[b]}	September 23	Ottawa	4–6	Vancouver		Nilsson	7,046	2–2–0
5	September 25	Ottawa	6–2	Vancouver		Anderson	18,781	3–2–0
6	September 28	Ottawa	3–4	Montreal	OT	Nilsson	20,746	3–2–1
Notes:^{a} Game was played at Mile One Centre in St. John's, Newfoundland and Labrador.^{b} Game was played at Abbotsford Centre in Abbotsford, British Columbia.

=== Regular season ===
The regular season schedule was published on June 25, 2019.

2019–20 game log

October: 3–7–1 (Home: 3–4–0; Road: 0–3–1)
#	Date	Visitor	Score	Home	OT	Decision	Attendance	Record	Pts	Recap
1	October 2	Ottawa	3–5	Toronto		Anderson	19,612	0–1–0	0
2	October 5	NY Rangers	4–1	Ottawa		Anderson	15,135	0–2–0	0
3	October 10	St. Louis	6–4	Ottawa		Nilsson	9,204	0–3–0	0
4	October 12	Tampa Bay	2–4	Ottawa		Anderson	11,023	1–3–0	2
5	October 14	Minnesota	2–0	Ottawa		Anderson	11,500	1–4–0	2
6	October 17	Ottawa	2–3	Vegas	SO	Nilsson	18,171	1–4–1	3
7	October 19	Ottawa	2–5	Arizona		Anderson	17,125	1–5–1	3
8	October 21	Ottawa	1–2	Dallas		Nilsson	17,896	1–6–1	3
9	October 23	Detroit	2–5	Ottawa		Nilsson	11,026	2–6–1	5
10	October 25	NY Islanders	4–2	Ottawa		Nilsson	11,189	2–7–1	5
11	October 27	San Jose	2–5	Ottawa		Anderson	9,740	3–7–1	7

November: 8–8–0 (Home: 4–1–0; Road: 4–7–0)
#	Date	Visitor	Score	Home	OT	Decision	Attendance	Record	Pts	Recap
12	November 2	Ottawa	2–5	Boston		Anderson	17,193	3–8–1	7
13	November 4	Ottawa	6–2	NY Rangers		Nilsson	16,302	4–8–1	9
14	November 5	Ottawa	1–4	NY Islanders		Anderson	11,212	4–9–1	9
15	November 7	Los Angeles	2–3	Ottawa	OT	Nilsson	9,929	5–9–1	11
16	November 9	Carolina	1–4	Ottawa		Nilsson	12,276	6–9–1	13
17	November 11	Ottawa	2–8	Carolina		Nilsson	12,356	6–10–1	13
18	November 13	Ottawa	4–2	New Jersey		Anderson	13,438	7–10–1	15
19	November 15	Philadelphia	1–2	Ottawa		Nilsson	10,664	8–10–1	17
20	November 16	Ottawa	2–4	Buffalo		Anderson	18,555	8–11–1	17
21	November 19	Ottawa	4–3	Detroit		Nilsson	19,156	9–11–1	19
22	November 20	Ottawa	2–1	Montreal	OT	Anderson	20,862	10–11–1	21
23	November 22	NY Rangers	1–4	Ottawa		Nilsson	12,349	11–11–1	23
24	November 25	Ottawa	0–1	Columbus		Anderson	14,730	11–12–1	23
25	November 27	Boston	2–1	Ottawa		Nilsson	13,336	11–13–1	23
26	November 29	Ottawa	2–7	Minnesota		Nilsson	17,112	11–14–1	23
27	November 30	Ottawa	1–3	Calgary		Hogberg	18,919	11–15–1	23

December: 5–4–4 (Home: 4–0–2; Road: 1–4–2)
#	Date	Visitor	Score	Home	OT	Decision	Attendance	Record	Pts	Recap
28	December 3	Ottawa	2–5	Vancouver		Nilsson	18,559	11–16–1	23
29	December 4	Ottawa	5–2	Edmonton		Anderson	17,162	12–16–1	25
30	December 7	Ottawa	3–4	Philadelphia		Nilsson	18,031	12–17–1	25
31	December 9	Boston	2–5	Ottawa		Nilsson	13,894	13–17–1	27
32	December 11	Ottawa	2–3	Montreal	OT	Nilsson	21,055	13–17–2	28
33	December 14	Columbus	3–4	Ottawa	OT	Nilsson	11,020	14–17–2	30
34	December 16	Ottawa	1–6	Florida		Nilsson	10,448	14–18–2	30
35	December 17	Ottawa	3–4	Tampa Bay	OT	Hogberg	19,092	14–18–3	31
36	December 19	Nashville	4–5	Ottawa	OT	Hogberg	10,407	15–18–3	33
37	December 21	Philadelphia	5–4	Ottawa	SO	Hogberg	11,203	15–18–4	34
38	December 23	Buffalo	1–3	Ottawa		Anderson	11,838	16–18–4	36
39	December 29	New Jersey	4–3	Ottawa	OT	Anderson	14,005	16–18–5	37
40	December 30	Ottawa	2–5	Pittsburgh		Hogberg	18,653	16–19–5	37

January: 2–5–4 (Home: 1–4–3; Road: 1–1–1)
#	Date	Visitor	Score	Home	OT	Decision	Attendance	Record	Pts	Recap
41	January 2	Florida	6–3	Ottawa		Anderson	10,991	16–20–5	37
42	January 4	Tampa Bay	5–3	Ottawa		Anderson	13,914	16–21–5	37
43	January 7	Ottawa	1–6	Washington		Anderson	18,573	16–22–5	37
44	January 10	Ottawa	2–3	Detroit	SO	Hogberg	18,724	16–22–6	38
45	January 11	Montreal	2–1	Ottawa	OT	Hogberg	18,088	16–22–7	39
46	January 14	Chicago	3–2	Ottawa	OT	Hogberg	12,238	16–22–8	40
47	January 16	Vegas	4–2	Ottawa		Anderson	12,412	16–23–8	40
48	January 18	Calgary	2–5	Ottawa		Hogberg	17,671	17–23–8	42
49	January 27	New Jersey	4–3	Ottawa	SO	Hogberg	9,673	17–23–9	43
50	January 28	Ottawa	5–2	Buffalo		Anderson	16,651	18–23–9	45
51	January 31	Washington	5–3	Ottawa		Hogberg	14,279	18–24–9	45

February: 5–7–3 (Home: 5–4–1; Road: 0–3–2)
#	Date	Visitor	Score	Home	OT	Decision	Attendance	Record	Pts	Recap
52	February 1	Ottawa	1–2	Toronto	OT	Anderson	19,406	18–24–10	46
53	February 4	Anaheim	3–2	Ottawa	SO	Hogberg	9,238	18–24–11	47
54	February 6	Colorado	4–1	Ottawa		Hogberg	11,465	18–25–11	47
55	February 8	Ottawa	2–5	Winnipeg		Anderson	15,325	18–26–11	47
56	February 11	Ottawa	0–3	Colorado		Hogberg	18,015	18–27–11	47
57	February 13	Arizona	2–3	Ottawa		Hogberg	9,762	19–27–11	49
58	February 15	Toronto	4–2	Ottawa		Hogberg	18,544	19–28–11	49
59	February 16	Dallas	3–4	Ottawa	OT	Anderson	13,150	20–28–11	51
60	February 18	Buffalo	4–7	Ottawa		Anderson	15,040	21–28–11	53
61	February 20	Winnipeg	5–1	Ottawa		Hogberg	11,183	21–29–11	53
62	February 22	Montreal	3–0	Ottawa		Anderson	18,374	21–30–11	53
63	February 24	Ottawa	3–4	Columbus	OT	Hogberg	17,518	21–30–12	54
64	February 25	Ottawa	2–3	Nashville		Anderson	17,205	21–31–12	54
65	February 27	Vancouver	2–5	Ottawa		Hogberg	12,166	22–31–12	56
66	February 29	Detroit	3–4	Ottawa	SO	Hogberg	15,505	23–31–12	58

March: 2–3–0 (Home: 1–0–0; Road: 1–3–0)
#	Date	Visitor	Score	Home	OT	Decision	Attendance	Record	Pts	Recap
67	March 3	Ottawa	3–7	Pittsburgh		Anderson	18,455	23–32–12	58
68	March 5	NY Islanders	3–4	Ottawa		Anderson	13,445	24–32–12	60
69	March 7	Ottawa	2–1	San Jose	OT	Anderson	16,018	25–32–12	62
70	March 10	Ottawa	2–5	Anaheim		Hogberg	15,044	25–33–12	62
71	March 11	Ottawa	2–3	Los Angeles		Anderson	12,030	25–34–12	62

Cancelled games
#	Date	Visitor	Home
72	March 13	Ottawa	Chicago
73	March 15	Ottawa	St. Louis
74	March 18	Edmonton	Ottawa
75	March 20	Ottawa	Washington
76	March 21	Ottawa	Carolina
77	March 24	Florida	Ottawa
78	March 26	Ottawa	Boston
79	March 28	Toronto	Ottawa
80	March 31	Ottawa	Tampa Bay
81	April 2	Ottawa	Florida
82	April 4	Pittsburgh	Ottawa

Legend: Win (2 points) Loss (0 points) Overtime/shootout loss (1 point)

== Players ==
=== Statistics ===
==== Skaters ====
Regular season
Player	GP	G	A	Pts	+/−	PIM
Brady Tkachuk	71	21	23	44	−14	106
Connor Brown	71	16	27	43	−6	24
Jean-Gabriel Pageau^{‡}	60	24	16	40	10	32
Anthony Duclair	66	23	17	40	−5	18
Thomas Chabot	71	6	33	39	−18	42
Chris Tierney	71	11	26	37	−6	20
Tyler Ennis^{‡}	61	14	19	33	−5	16
Vladislav Namestnikov^{†‡}	54	13	12	25	−5	35
Colin White	61	7	16	23	−12	39
Artem Anisimov	49	15	5	20	−15	8
Nick Paul	56	9	11	20	0	24
Mark Borowiecki	53	7	11	18	1	58
Nikita Zaitsev	58	1	11	12	−8	22
Mike Reilly^{†}	30	1	11	12	−8	18
Ron Hainsey	64	1	11	12	10	12
Drake Batherson	23	3	7	10	−12	13
Dylan DeMelo^{‡}	49	0	10	10	3	31
Bobby Ryan	24	5	3	8	3	22
Logan Brown	23	1	7	8	0	4
Jayce Hawryluk^{†}	11	2	5	7	2	8
Filip Chlapik	31	3	3	6	−7	10
Scott Sabourin	35	2	4	6	−6	33
Mikkel Boedker	20	2	2	4	−1	0
Erik Brannstrom	31	0	4	4	−9	16
Rudolfs Balcers	15	1	2	3	−2	0
Andreas Englund	24	0	3	3	−8	12
Christian Jaros	13	0	3	3	−2	6
Cody Goloubef^{‡}	24	1	1	2	−2	8
Matthew Peca^{†}	9	0	2	2	−2	0
Vitalii Abramov	2	1	0	1	0	2
Jonathan Davidsson	6	0	1	1	0	0
Jean-Christophe Beaudin	22	0	1	1	−4	7
Jordan Szwarz	3	0	0	0	0	2
Maxime Lajoie	6	0	0	0	0	0
Josh Norris	3	0	0	0	2	0
Max Veronneau^{‡}	4	0	0	0	−2	0
Christian Wolanin	3	0	0	0	1	0

==== Goaltenders ====
Regular season
Player	GP	GS	TOI	W	L	OT	GA	GAA	SA	SV%	SO	G	A	PIM
Craig Anderson	34	31	1,845:11	11	17	2	100	3.25	1,018	.902	0	0	1	0
Anders Nilsson	20	19	1,093:16	9	9	2	58	3.18	628	.908	0	0	0	0
Marcus Hogberg	24	21	1,344:33	5	8	8	70	3.12	728	.904	0	0	0	0

^{†}Denotes player spent time with another team before joining the Senators. Stats reflect time with the Senators only.
^{‡}No longer with team.
Bold denotes team leader in that category.

=== Awards and honours ===
Player	Award	Date
Anders Nilsson	NHL 1st Star of Week	November 11, 2019

==== Milestones ====
Player	Milestone	Date
Scott Sabourin	1st career NHL game 1st career NHL goal 1st career NHL point	October 2, 2019
Connor Brown	100th career NHL point	October 2, 2019
Vitalii Abramov	1st career NHL goal 1st career NHL point	October 10, 2019
Scott Sabourin	1st career NHL assist	October 10, 2019
Ron Hainsey	300th career NHL point	October 12, 2019
Bobby Ryan	300th career NHL assist	October 12, 2019
J. C. Beaudin	1st career NHL game	October 23, 2019
Jonathan Davidsson	1st career NHL game	November 7, 2019
J. C. Beaudin	1st career NHL assist 1st career NHL point	November 9, 2019
Jonathan Davidsson	1st career NHL assist 1st career NHL point	November 9, 2019
Brady Tkachuk	100th career NHL game	December 5, 2019
Craig Anderson	200th win as Ottawa Senator	February 18, 2020

== Transactions ==
The Senators have been involved in the following transactions during the 2019–20 season.

=== Trades ===
Date	Details		Ref
July 1, 2019	To Toronto Maple Leafs Cody Ceci; Ben Harpur; Aaron Luchuk; CBJ's 3rd-round pick in 2020	To Ottawa Senators Connor Brown; Michael Carcone; Nikita Zaitsev	
July 16, 2019	To Chicago Blackhawks Zack Smith	To Ottawa Senators Artem Anisimov	
July 30, 2019	To Tampa Bay Lightning Mike Condon; 6th-round pick in 2020	To Ottawa Senators Ryan Callahan; 5th-round pick in 2020	
October 7, 2019	To New York Rangers Nick Ebert; 4th-round pick in 2021	To Ottawa Senators Vladislav Namestnikov	
October 26, 2019	To Florida Panthers Jack Rodewald	To Ottawa Senators Chris Wilkie	
January 2, 2020	To Montreal Canadiens Andrew Sturtz; 5th-round pick in 2021	To Ottawa Senators Mike Reilly	
February 18, 2020	To Winnipeg Jets Dylan DeMelo	To Ottawa Senators 3rd-round pick in 2020	
February 19, 2020	To Toronto Maple Leafs Max Veronneau	To Ottawa Senators Aaron Luchuk conditional 6th-round pick in 2021	
February 24, 2020	To New York Islanders Jean-Gabriel Pageau	To Ottawa Senators 1st-round pick in 2020 or 2021; 2nd-round pick in 2020 conditional 3rd-round pick in 2021	
February 24, 2020	To Colorado Avalanche Vladislav Namestnikov	To Ottawa Senators 4th-round pick in 2021	
February 24, 2020	To Montreal Canadiens Aaron Luchuk; 7th-round pick in 2020	To Ottawa Senators Matthew Peca	
February 24, 2020	To Edmonton Oilers Tyler Ennis	To Ottawa Senators 5th-round pick in 2021	
October 2, 2020	To Florida Panthers 4th-round pick (95th) in 2020	To Ottawa Senators Josh Brown	

=== Free agents ===
Date	Player	Team	Contract term	Source
June 25, 2019	Stefan Elliott	to Dinamo Minsk (KHL)	1-year	
July 1, 2019	Ron Hainsey	from Toronto Maple Leafs	1-year	
July 1, 2019	Tyler Ennis	from Toronto Maple Leafs	1-year	
July 1, 2019	Jordan Szwarz	from Boston Bruins	1-year	
July 4, 2019	Brian Gibbons	to Carolina Hurricanes	1-year	
July 8, 2019	Darren Archibald	to Toronto Marlies (AHL)	1-year	
July 11, 2019	Erik Burgdoerfer	to Hershey Bears (AHL)	1-year	
September 27, 2019	Scott Sabourin	from Stockton Heat (AHL)	1-year	
April 11, 2020	Jonathan Aspirot	from Belleville Senators (AHL)	3-year	
May 1, 2020	Artyom Zub	from SKA Saint Petersburg (KHL)	1-year	

=== Waivers ===
Date	Player	Team	Ref
February 17, 2020	Jayce Hawryluk	from Florida Panthers	
February 21, 2020	Cody Goloubef	to Detroit Red Wings	

=== Contract terminations ===
Date	Player	Via	Source

=== Retirement ===
Date	Player	Source

=== Signings ===
Date	Player	Contract term	Source
June 25, 2019	Cody Goloubef	1-year	
June 27, 2019	Jack Rodewald	1-year	
July 2, 2019	Nick Paul	1-year	
July 4, 2019	Christian Wolanin	2-year	
July 15, 2019	Michael Carcone	2-year	
July 15, 2019	Lassi Thomson	3-year	
August 21, 2019	Colin White	6-year	
September 19, 2019	Thomas Chabot	8-year	
April 9, 2020	Mark Kastelic	3-year	
April 13, 2020	Kevin Mandolese	3-year	

== Draft picks ==
Below are the Ottawa Senators' selections at the 2019 NHL entry draft, which was held on June 21 and 22, 2019, at Rogers Arena in Vancouver, British Columbia, Canada.

Round	Overall	Player	Position	Nationality	Club team
1	19^{1}	Lassi Thomson	D	Finland	Kelowna Rockets (WHL)
2	32	Shane Pinto	C	United States	Tri-City Storm (USHL)
2	37^{2}	Mads Sogaard	G	Denmark	Medicine Hat Tigers (WHL)
4	94	Viktor Lodin	C	Sweden	Örebro (SHL)
5	125	Mark Kastelic	C	United States	Calgary Hitmen (WHL)
7	187	Maxence Guenette	D	Canada	Val-d'Or Foreurs (QMJHL)

=== Notes ===
1. The Columbus Blue Jackets' first-round pick went to the Ottawa Senators as the result of a trade on February 22, 2019, that sent Matt Duchene and Julius Bergman to Columbus in exchange for Vitalii Abramov, Jonathan Davidsson, a conditional first-round pick in 2020 and this pick (being conditional at the time of the trade).
2. The New York Rangers' second-round pick went to the Ottawa Senators as the result of a trade on June 22, 2019, that sent Florida's second-round pick and Pittsburgh's third-round pick both in 2019 (44th and 83rd overall) to Carolina in exchange for this pick.
