= 2019–20 Toronto Maple Leafs season =

National Hockey League team season

2019–20 Toronto Maple Leafs
- Division: 3rd Atlantic
- Conference: 8th Eastern
- 2019–20 record: 36–25–9
- Home record: 18–9–7
- Road record: 18–16–2
- Goals for: 238
- Goals against: 227

Team information
- General manager: Kyle Dubas
- Coach: Mike Babcock (Oct. 2 – Nov. 20; Sheldon Keefe (Nov. 20 – Aug. 9)
- Captain: John Tavares
- Alternate captains: Mitch Marner; Auston Matthews; Morgan Rielly
- Arena: Scotiabank Arena
- Average attendance: 19,302
- Minor league affiliates: Toronto Marlies (AHL); Newfoundland Growlers (ECHL)

Team leaders
- Goals: Auston Matthews (47)
- Assists: Mitch Marner (51)
- Points: Auston Matthews (80)
- Penalty minutes: Justin Holl (43)
- Plus/minus: Auston Matthews (+19)
- Wins: Frederik Andersen (29)
- Goals against average: Jack Campbell (2.63)

The 2019–20 Toronto Maple Leafs season was the 103rd season for the National Hockey League (NHL) franchise that was established on November 22, 1917.

The season was suspended by the league officials on March 12, 2020, after several other professional and collegiate sports organizations followed suit as a result of the COVID-19 pandemic. On May 26, the NHL regular season was officially declared over with the remaining games being cancelled. The Maple Leafs advanced to the qualifying round of the playoffs, but lost to the Columbus Blue Jackets, two games to three, and missed the traditional playoffs for the first time since the 2015–16 season.

== Regular season ==
The season was generally considered disappointing for the Leafs. In the offseason they were predicted to have a strong season and be a major playoff contender. However, they never really lived up to that promise. At the start of the season, John Tavares was named the 25th captain in the history of the Maple Leafs, filling a position that had been vacant since Dion Phaneuf was traded to the Ottawa Senators in February 2016. Auston Matthews, Mitch Marner, and Morgan Rielly were named alternate captains. The Maple Leafs won their season opener 5–3 against the Ottawa Senators on October 3. Matthews scored two goals, becoming the fourth player in NHL history to score in each of his first four-season openers. Ilya Mikheyev also had a goal and an assist in his NHL debut during the season opener. However, the Leafs would go on to post a disappointing 6-5-3 record for October.

On November 20, following a six-game skid and only two regulation wins in their past 16 games, the Maple Leafs fired head coach Mike Babcock, and replaced him with their AHL affiliation Toronto Marlies head coach Sheldon Keefe. After the coaching change, the team saw some improvement.

On February 22, 2020, the Leafs lost a game to the Carolina Hurricanes while David Ayres, a Zamboni driver who worked within the Leafs organization, played goal for the Hurricanes after both Hurricane goalies were injured in said game. It was the first time in NHL history that an emergency backup goaltender recorded a win. Steve Dangle's YouTube video titled "THEY LOST TO A ZAMBONI DRIVER" went viral after the game.

After the NHL was paused in March and resumed in August, the Leafs played the Columbus Blue Jackets in the qualifying round (which was unique to the 2020 NHL Playoffs), and lost the best of 5 series in 5 games.

== Standings ==
=== Divisional standings ===
Atlantic Division
Pos	Team	GP	W	L	OTL	RW	GF	GA	GD	Pts
1	p – Boston Bruins	70	44	14	12	38	227	174	+53	100
2	Tampa Bay Lightning	70	43	21	6	35	245	195	+50	92
3	Toronto Maple Leafs	70	36	25	9	28	238	227	+11	81
4	Florida Panthers	69	35	26	8	30	231	228	+3	78
5	Montreal Canadiens	71	31	31	9	19	212	221	−9	71
6	Buffalo Sabres	69	30	31	8	22	195	217	−22	68
7	Ottawa Senators	71	25	34	12	18	191	243	−52	62
8	Detroit Red Wings	71	17	49	5	13	145	267	−122	39

Source: National Hockey League
p – Clinched Presidents' Trophy

=== Eastern Conference ===
Pos	Team	GP	W	L	OTL	RW	GF	GA	GD	PCT	Qualification
1	Boston Bruins	70	44	14	12	38	227	174	+53	.714	Advance to Seeding round-robin tournament
2	Tampa Bay Lightning	70	43	21	6	35	245	195	+50	.657	Advance to Seeding round-robin tournament
3	Washington Capitals	69	41	20	8	31	240	215	+25	.652	Advance to Seeding round-robin tournament
4	Philadelphia Flyers	69	41	21	7	31	232	196	+36	.645	Advance to Seeding round-robin tournament
5	Pittsburgh Penguins	69	40	23	6	29	224	196	+28	.623	Advance to 2020 Stanley Cup playoffs qualifying round
6	Carolina Hurricanes	68	38	25	5	27	222	193	+29	.596	Advance to 2020 Stanley Cup playoffs qualifying round
7	New York Islanders	68	35	23	10	24	192	193	−1	.588	Advance to 2020 Stanley Cup playoffs qualifying round
8	Toronto Maple Leafs	70	36	25	9	28	238	227	+11	.579	Advance to 2020 Stanley Cup playoffs qualifying round
9	Columbus Blue Jackets	70	33	22	15	25	180	187	−7	.579	Advance to 2020 Stanley Cup playoffs qualifying round
10	Florida Panthers	69	35	26	8	30	231	228	+3	.565	Advance to 2020 Stanley Cup playoffs qualifying round
11	New York Rangers	70	37	28	5	31	234	222	+12	.564	Advance to 2020 Stanley Cup playoffs qualifying round
12	Montreal Canadiens	71	31	31	9	19	212	221	−9	.500	Advance to 2020 Stanley Cup playoffs qualifying round
13	Buffalo Sabres	69	30	31	8	22	195	217	−22	.493	
14	New Jersey Devils	69	28	29	12	22	189	230	−41	.493	
15	Ottawa Senators	71	25	34	12	18	191	243	−52	.437	
16	Detroit Red Wings	71	17	49	5	13	145	267	−122	.275	

Source: National Hockey League

== Schedule and results ==
=== Preseason ===
2019 preseason: 5–3–0 (Home: 3–1–0; Road: 2–2–0)

Game	Date	Opponent	Score	OT	Decision	Location	Attendance	Record	Recap
1	September 17	Ottawa Senators	1–3		Kaskisuo (0–1–0)	Mile One Centre	—	0–1–0	
2	September 18	@ Ottawa Senators	3–4		Hutchinson (0–1–0)	Canadian Tire Centre	11,531	0–2–0	
3	September 20	Buffalo Sabres	3–0		Andersen (1–0–0)	Scotiabank Arena	16,232	1–2–0	
4	September 21	@ Buffalo Sabres	3–5		Hutchinson (0–2–0)	KeyBank Center	17,224	1–3–0	
5	September 23	@ Montreal Canadiens	3–0		Hutchinson (1–2–0)	Bell Centre	—	2–3–0	
6	September 25	Montreal Canadiens	3–0		Andersen (2–0–0)	Scotiabank Arena	18,863	3–3–0	
7	September 27	@ Detroit Red Wings	4–3	SO	Woll (1–0–0)	Little Caesars Arena	—	4–3–0	
8	September 28	Detroit Red Wings	5–0		Andersen (3–0–0)	Scotiabank Arena	18,892	5–3–0	

=== Regular season ===
2019–20 game log: 36–25–9, 81 points (Home: 18–9–7; Road: 18–16–2)
October: 6–5–3, 15 points (Home: 4–2–3; Road: 2–3–0)

Game	Date	Opponent	Score	OT	Decision	Location	Attendance	Record	Points	Recap
1	October 2	Ottawa Senators	5–3		Andersen (1–0–0)	Scotiabank Arena	19,612	1–0–0	2	
2	October 4	@ Columbus Blue Jackets	4–1		Andersen (2–0–0)	Nationwide Arena	18,776	2–0–0	4	
3	October 5	Montreal Canadiens	5–6	SO	Hutchinson (0–0–1)	Scotiabank Arena	19,547	2–0–1	5	
4	October 7	St. Louis Blues	2–3		Andersen (2–1–0)	Scotiabank Arena	19,466	2–1–1	5	
5	October 10	Tampa Bay Lightning	3–7		Andersen (2–2–0)	Scotiabank Arena	19,387	2–2–1	5	
6	October 12	@ Detroit Red Wings	5–2		Andersen (3–2–0)	Little Caesars Arena	19,515	3–2–1	7	
7	October 15	Minnesota Wild	4–2		Andersen (4–2–0)	Scotiabank Arena	19,149	4–2–1	9	
8	October 16	@ Washington Capitals	3–4		Hutchinson (0–1–1)	Capital One Arena	18,573	4–3–1	9	
9	October 19	Boston Bruins	4–3	OT	Andersen (5–2–0)	Scotiabank Arena	19,394	5–3–1	11	
10	October 21	Columbus Blue Jackets	3–4	OT	Andersen (5–2–1)	Scotiabank Arena	18,898	5–3–2	12	
11	October 22	@ Boston Bruins	2–4		Hutchinson (0–2–1)	TD Garden	17,193	5–4–2	12	
12	October 25	San Jose Sharks	4–1		Andersen (6–2–1)	Scotiabank Arena	19,102	6–4–2	14	
13	October 26	@ Montreal Canadiens	2–5		Hutchinson (0–3–1)	Bell Centre	21,302	6–5–2	14	
14	October 29	Washington Capitals	3–4	OT	Andersen (6–2–2)	Scotiabank Arena	19,258	6–5–3	15	

November: 7–6–1, 15 points (Home: 3–1–1; Road: 4–5–0)

Game	Date	Opponent	Score	OT	Decision	Location	Attendance	Record	Points	Recap
15	November 2	@ Philadelphia Flyers	4–3	SO	Andersen (7–2–2)	Wells Fargo Center	18,441	7–5–3	17	
16	November 5	Los Angeles Kings	3–1		Andersen (8–2–2)	Scotiabank Arena	19,195	8–5–3	19	
17	November 7	Vegas Golden Knights	2–1	OT	Andersen (9–2–2)	Scotiabank Arena	19,218	9–5–3	21	
18	November 9	Philadelphia Flyers	2–3	SO	Andersen (9–2–3)	Scotiabank Arena	19,279	9–5–4	22	
19	November 10	@ Chicago Blackhawks	4–5		Hutchinson (0–4–1)	United Center	21,598	9–6–4	22	
20	November 13	@ New York Islanders	4–5		Andersen (9–3–3)	Nassau Coliseum	13,293	9–7–4	22	
21	November 15	Boston Bruins	2–4		Andersen (9–4–3)	Scotiabank Arena	19,434	9–8–4	22	
22	November 16	@ Pittsburgh Penguins	1–6		Kaskisuo (0–1–0)	PPG Paints Arena	18,587	9–9–4	22	
23	November 19	@ Vegas Golden Knights	2–4		Andersen (9–5–3)	T-Mobile Arena	18,292	9–10–4	22	
24	November 21	@ Arizona Coyotes	3–1		Andersen (10–5–3)	Gila River Arena	12,495	10–10–4	24	
25	November 23	@ Colorado Avalanche	5–3		Andersen (11–5–3)	Pepsi Center	18,137	11–10–4	26	
26	November 27	@ Detroit Red Wings	6–0		Andersen (12–5–3)	Little Caesars Arena	19,515	12–10–4	28	
27	November 29	@ Buffalo Sabres	4–6		Hutchinson (0–5–1)	KeyBank Center	19,070	12–11–4	28	
28	November 30	Buffalo Sabres	2–1	OT	Andersen (13–5–3)	Scotiabank Arena	19,250	13–11–4	30	

December: 9–3–1, 19 points (Home: 3–1–1; Road: 6–2–0)

Game	Date	Opponent	Score	OT	Decision	Location	Attendance	Record	Points	Recap
29	December 3	@ Philadelphia Flyers	1–6		Andersen (13–6–3)	Wells Fargo Center	15,811	13–12–4	30	
30	December 4	Colorado Avalanche	1–3		Andersen (13–7–3)	Scotiabank Arena	19,351	13–13–4	30	
31	December 7	@ St. Louis Blues	5–2		Andersen (14–7–3)	Enterprise Center	18,096	14–13–4	32	
32	December 10	@ Vancouver Canucks	4–1		Andersen (15–7–3)	Rogers Arena	18,290	15–13–4	34	
33	December 12	@ Calgary Flames	2–4		Andersen (15–8–3)	Scotiabank Saddledome	19,289	15–14–4	34	
34	December 14	@ Edmonton Oilers	4–1		Andersen (16–8–3)	Rogers Place	18,347	16–14–4	36	
35	December 17	Buffalo Sabres	5–3		Andersen (17–8–3)	Scotiabank Arena	19,365	17–14–4	38	
36	December 20	@ New York Rangers	6–3		Andersen (18–8–3)	Madison Square Garden	16,909	18–14–4	40	
37	December 21	Detroit Red Wings	4–1		Hutchinson (1–5–1)	Scotiabank Arena	19,080	19–14–4	42	
38	December 23	Carolina Hurricanes	8–6		Andersen (19–8–3)	Scotiabank Arena	19,176	20–14–4	44	
39	December 27	@ New Jersey Devils	5–4	OT	Hutchinson (2–5–1)	Prudential Center	16,514	21–14–4	46	
40	December 28	New York Rangers	4–5	OT	Andersen (19–8–4)	Scotiabank Arena	19,492	21–14–5	47	
41	December 31	@ Minnesota Wild	4–1		Andersen (20–8–4)	Xcel Energy Center	18,164	22–14–5	49	

January: 5–3–2, 12 points (Home: 2–2–2; Road: 3–1–0)

Game	Date	Opponent	Score	OT	Decision	Location	Attendance	Record	Points	Recap
42	January 2	@ Winnipeg Jets	6–3		Andersen (21–8–4)	Bell MTS Place	15,325	23–14–5	51	
43	January 4	New York Islanders	3–0		Hutchinson (3–5–1)	Scotiabank Arena	19,536	24–14–5	53	
44	January 6	Edmonton Oilers	4–6		Hutchinson (3–6–1)	Scotiabank Arena	19,507	24–15–5	53	
45	January 8	Winnipeg Jets	3–4	SO	Andersen (21–8–5)	Scotiabank Arena	19,397	24–15–6	54	
46	January 12	@ Florida Panthers	4–8		Hutchinson (3–7–1)	BB&T Center	15,535	24–16–6	54	
47	January 14	New Jersey Devils	7–4		Andersen (22–8–5)	Scotiabank Arena	19,124	25–16–6	56	
48	January 16	Calgary Flames	1–2	SO	Andersen (22–8–6)	Scotiabank Arena	19,462	25–16–7	57	
49	January 18	Chicago Blackhawks	2–6		Andersen (22–9–6)	Scotiabank Arena	19,502	25–17–7	57	
50	January 27	@ Nashville Predators	5–2		Andersen (23–9–6)	Bridgestone Arena	17,298	26–17–7	59	
51	January 29	@ Dallas Stars	5–3		Andersen (24–9–6)	American Airlines Center	18,532	27–17–7	61	

February: 8–6–1, 17 points (Home: 5–3–0; Road: 3–3–1)

Game	Date	Opponent	Score	OT	Decision	Location	Attendance	Record	Points	Recap
52	February 1	Ottawa Senators	2–1	OT	Hutchinson (4–7–1)	Scotiabank Arena	19,406	28–17–7	63	
53	February 3	Florida Panthers	3–5		Hutchinson (4–8–1)	Scotiabank Arena	19,156	28–18–7	63	
54	February 5	@ New York Rangers	3–5		Hutchinson (4–9–1)	Madison Square Garden	17,123	28–19–7	63	
55	February 7	Anaheim Ducks	5–4	OT	Campbell (1–0–0)	Scotiabank Arena	19,077	29–19–7	65	
56	February 8	@ Montreal Canadiens	1–2	OT	Campbell (1–0–1)	Bell Centre	21,302	29–19–8	66	
57	February 11	Arizona Coyotes	3–2	OT	Campbell (2–0–1)	Scotiabank Arena	19,039	30–19–8	68	
58	February 13	Dallas Stars	2–3		Andersen (24–10–6)	Scotiabank Arena	19,107	30–20–8	68	
59	February 15	@ Ottawa Senators	4–2		Campbell (3–0–1)	Canadian Tire Centre	18,544	31–20–8	70	
60	February 16	@ Buffalo Sabres	2–5		Andersen (24–11–6)	KeyBank Center	19,070	31–21–8	70	
61	February 18	@ Pittsburgh Penguins	2–5		Andersen (24–12–6)	PPG Paints Arena	18,466	31–22–8	70	
62	February 20	Pittsburgh Penguins	4–0		Andersen (25–12–6)	Scotiabank Arena	19,386	32–22–8	72	
63	February 22	Carolina Hurricanes	3–6		Andersen (25–13–6)	Scotiabank Arena	19,414	32–23–8	72	
64	February 25	@ Tampa Bay Lightning	4–3		Andersen (26–13–6)	Amalie Arena	19,092	33–23–8	74	
65	February 27	@ Florida Panthers	5–3		Andersen (27–13–6)	BB&T Center	16,322	34–23–8	76	
66	February 29	Vancouver Canucks	4–2		Andersen (28–13–6)	Scotiabank Arena	19,371	35–23–8	78	

March: 1–2–1, 3 points (Home: 1–0–0; Road: 0–2–1)

Game	Date	Opponent	Score	OT	Decision	Location	Attendance	Record	Points	Recap
67	March 3	@ San Jose Sharks	2–5		Campbell (3–1–1)	SAP Center	16,129	35–24–8	78	
68	March 5	@ Los Angeles Kings	0–1	SO	Andersen (28–13–7)	Staples Center	17,495	35–24–9	79	
69	March 6	@ Anaheim Ducks	1–2		Campbell (3–2–1)	Honda Center	15,984	35–25–9	79	
70	March 10	Tampa Bay Lightning	2–1		Andersen (29–13–7)	Scotiabank Arena	19,124	36–25–9	81	

Cancelled games

Game	Date	Opponent	Location
71	March 12	Nashville Predators	Scotiabank Arena
72	March 14	@ Boston Bruins	TD Garden
73	March 17	New Jersey Devils	Scotiabank Arena
74	March 19	New York Islanders	Scotiabank Arena
75	March 21	Columbus Blue Jackets	Scotiabank Arena
76	March 23	Florida Panthers	Scotiabank Arena
77	March 25	@ Tampa Bay Lightning	Amalie Arena
78	March 26	@ Carolina Hurricanes	PNC Arena
79	March 28	@ Ottawa Senators	Canadian Tire Centre
80	March 31	@ Washington Capitals	Capital One Arena
81	April 2	Detroit Red Wings	Scotiabank Arena
82	April 4	Montreal Canadiens	Scotiabank Arena

2019–20 schedule

Win (2 Points) Loss (0 points) Overtime/shootout loss (1 point)

=== Playoffs ===
The Maple Leafs were defeated by the Columbus Blue Jackets in the qualifying round in five games.

2020 Stanley Cup playoffs
Eastern Conference Qualifying Round vs. (9) Columbus Blue Jackets: Columbus won 3–2

Game	Date	Opponent	Score	OT	Decision	Location	Series	Recap
1	August 2	Columbus Blue Jackets	0–2		Andersen (0–1)	Scotiabank Arena	0–1	
2	August 4	Columbus Blue Jackets	3–0		Andersen (1–1)	Scotiabank Arena	1–1	
3	August 6	@ Columbus Blue Jackets	3–4	OT	Andersen (1–2)	Scotiabank Arena	1–2	
4	August 7	@ Columbus Blue Jackets	4–3	OT	Andersen (2–2)	Scotiabank Arena	2–2	
5	August 9	Columbus Blue Jackets	0–3		Andersen (2–3)	Scotiabank Arena	2–3	

Win Loss

== Player statistics ==
=== Skaters ===
Regular season
Player	GP	G	A	Pts	+/−	PIM
Auston Matthews	70	47	33	80	19	8
Mitch Marner	59	16	51	67	6	16
John Tavares	63	26	34	60	−7	24
William Nylander	68	31	28	59	−2	12
Tyson Barrie	70	5	34	39	−7	16
Zach Hyman	51	21	16	37	13	23
Kasperi Kapanen	69	13	23	36	0	22
Alexander Kerfoot	65	9	19	28	−2	32
Morgan Rielly	47	3	24	27	6	24
Jason Spezza	58	9	16	25	−3	18
Ilya Mikheyev	39	8	15	23	7	4
Jake Muzzin	53	6	17	23	12	40
Andreas Johnsson	43	8	13	21	0	14
Justin Holl	68	2	16	18	13	43
Pierre Engvall	48	8	7	15	4	6
Frederik Gauthier	61	7	5	12	−4	10
Travis Dermott	56	4	7	11	14	37
Dmytro Timashov^{(X)}	39	4	5	9	1	16
Rasmus Sandin	28	1	7	8	−7	10
Cody Ceci	56	1	7	8	7	20
Trevor Moore^{(X)}	27	3	2	5	−3	4
Martin Marincin	26	1	3	4	−1	14
Nick Shore^{(X)}	21	2	1	3	2	12
Kyle Clifford^{(p)}	16	1	2	3	–1	23
Nic Petan^{(M)}	16	0	3	3	−4	4
Adam Brooks^{(M)}	7	0	3	3	1	0
Yegor Korshkov^{(M)}	1	1	0	1	1	0
Mason Marchment^{(X)}	4	0	1	1	0	0
Timothy Liljegren^{(M)}	11	0	1	1	−5	2
Pontus Aberg^{(M)}	5	0	1	1	0	0
Calle Rosen^{(p)}	4	0	1	1	−2	0
Denis Malgin^{(p)}	8	0	0	0	−3	2
Kevin Gravel^{(M)}	3	0	0	0	0	0

Playoffs
Player	GP	G	A	Pts	+/−	PIM
Auston Matthews	5	2	4	6	1	0
William Nylander	5	2	2	4	−3	0
Mitch Marner	5	0	4	4	−1	2
John Tavares	5	2	1	3	−3	0
Zach Hyman	5	1	2	3	0	0
Alexander Kerfoot	5	0	3	3	0	2
Kasperi Kapanen	5	0	2	2	−2	14
Nicholas Robertson	4	1	0	1	−1	2
Morgan Rielly	5	1	0	1	−1	2
Cody Ceci	5	1	0	1	0	4
Travis Dermott	5	0	1	1	−2	4
Andreas Johnsson	1	0	0	0	0	0
Ilya Mikheyev	5	0	0	0	−1	0
Pierre Engvall	4	0	0	0	0	0
Justin Holl	5	0	0	0	−3	2
Martin Marincin	3	0	0	0	−2	0
Tyson Barrie	5	0	0	0	−2	2
Kyle Clifford	5	0	0	0	0	0
Jason Spezza	5	0	0	0	0	9
Frederik Gauthier	1	0	0	0	0	0
Jake Muzzin	2	0	0	0	0	2

=== Goaltenders ===
Regular season
Player	GP	GS	TOI	W	L	OT	GA	GAA	SA	SV%	SO	G	A	PIM
Frederik Andersen	52	52	3,006:40	29	13	7	143	2.85	1,577	.909	3	0	0	0
Michael Hutchinson^{(X)}	15	11	787:01	4	9	1	48	3.66	421	.886	1	0	0	0
Jack Campbell^{(p)}	6	6	365:21	3	2	1	16	2.63	189	.915	0	0	0	0
Kasimir Kaskisuo^{(M)}	1	1	60:00	0	1	0	6	6.00	38	.842	0	0	0	0

Playoffs
Player	GP	GS	TOI	W	L	GA	GAA	SA	SV%	SO	G	A	PIM
Frederik Andersen	5	5	326:17	2	3	10	1.84	157	.936	1	0	0	0

^{(M)} Player currently playing for the minor league affiliate Toronto Marlies of the AHL
^{(X)} Player is no longer with the Maple Leafs organization
^{(p)} Player previously played with another team before being acquired by Toronto
Bold/italics denotes franchise record.

== Transactions ==
The Maple Leafs have been involved in the following transactions during the 2019–20 season.

=== Trades ===
Date	Details		Ref
June 22, 2019	To Carolina Hurricanes Patrick Marleau; Conditional 1st-round pick in 2020; 7th-round pick in 2020	To Toronto Maple Leafs 6th-round pick in 2020	
July 1, 2019	To Ottawa Senators Connor Brown; Michael Carcone; Nikita Zaitsev	To Toronto Maple Leafs Cody Ceci; Ben Harpur; Aaron Luchuk; CBJ's 3rd-round pick in 2020	
July 1, 2019	To Colorado Avalanche Nazem Kadri; Calle Rosen; 3rd-round pick in 2020	To Toronto Maple Leafs Tyson Barrie; Alexander Kerfoot; 6th-round pick in 2020	
July 23, 2019	To Vegas Golden Knights Garret Sparks	To Toronto Maple Leafs David Clarkson; 4th-round pick in 2020	
July 25, 2019	To St. Louis Blues Andreas Borgman	To Toronto Maple Leafs Jordan Schmaltz	
February 5, 2020	To Los Angeles Kings Trevor Moore; CBJ's 3rd-round pick in 2020; Conditional 3rd-round pick in 2021	To Toronto Maple Leafs Jack Campbell; Kyle Clifford	
February 19, 2020	To Florida Panthers Mason Marchment	To Toronto Maple Leafs Denis Malgin	
February 19, 2020	To Ottawa Senators Aaron Luchuk; Conditional 6th-round pick in 2021	To Toronto Maple Leafs Max Veronneau	
February 24, 2020	To Colorado Avalanche Michael Hutchinson	To Toronto Maple Leafs Calle Rosen	
February 24, 2020	To New York Islanders Jordan Schmaltz	To Toronto Maple Leafs Matt Lorito	
February 24, 2020	To Chicago Blackhawks Martins Dzierkals	To Toronto Maple Leafs Robin Lehner	
February 24, 2020	To Vegas Golden Knights Robin Lehner	To Toronto Maple Leafs 5th-round pick in 2020	
February 24, 2020	Nashville Predators Ben Harpur	To Toronto Maple Leafs Miikka Salomaki	
August 25, 2020	To Pittsburgh Penguins Kasperi Kapanen; Pontus Aberg; Jesper Lindgren	To Toronto Maple Leafs David Warsofsky; Evan Rodrigues; Filip Hallander; 1st-round pick in 2020	

=== Free agents ===
Date	Player	Team	Contract term	Ref
July 1, 2019	Jason Spezza	from Dallas Stars	1-year	
July 1, 2019	Tyler Ennis	to Ottawa Senators	1-year	
July 1, 2019	Ron Hainsey	to Ottawa Senators	1-year	
July 1, 2019	Chris Mueller	to Tampa Bay Lightning	1-year	
July 24, 2019	Pontus Aberg	from Minnesota Wild	1-year	
July 24, 2019	Kenny Agostino	from New Jersey Devils	2-year	
July 24, 2019	Tyler Gaudet	from Nashville Predators	1-year	
July 24, 2019	Kalle Kossila	from Anaheim Ducks	2-year	
July 24, 2019	Nick Shore	from Metallurg Magnitogorsk (KHL)	1-year	
July 24, 2019	Garrett Wilson	from Pittsburgh Penguins	1-year	
July 24, 2019	Kevin Gravel	from Edmonton Oilers	1-year	

=== Waivers ===
Date	Player	Team	Ref
December 4, 2019	Nick Shore	to Winnipeg Jets	
February 24, 2020	Dmytro Timashov	to Detroit Red Wings	

=== Signings ===
Date	Player	Contract term	Ref
June 28, 2019	Kasperi Kapanen	3-year	
June 28, 2019	Andreas Johnsson	4-year	
June 29, 2019	Michael Hutchinson	1-year	
June 29, 2019	Martin Marincin	1-year	
July 4, 2019	Alexander Kerfoot	4-year	
July 4, 2019	Cody Ceci	1-year	
September 13, 2019	Mitch Marner	6-year	
September 19, 2019	Nicholas Robertson	3-year	
December 31, 2019	Justin Holl	3-year	
January 10, 2020	Martin Marincin	1-year	
February 12, 2020	Pierre Engvall	2-year	
February 24, 2020	Jake Muzzin	4-year	

== Draft picks ==
Below are the Toronto Maple Leafs' selections at the 2019 NHL entry draft, which was held on June 21 and 22, 2019, at Rogers Arena in Vancouver, British Columbia. The Leafs held on to four of their own seven picks (rounds 2, 3, 4, 5). In January 2019 they had traded away their first round pick along with Carl Grundström to Los Angeles for Jake Muzzin. During last year's draft they traded away this year's 6th round draft pick to Buffalo in exchange for the Sabres' 2018 6th round pick. Finally, before their 7th round pick was made they traded it to St. Louis in exchange for the Blues' 7th round pick in 2020. They acquired an additional two picks this year through various trades.

Round	#	Player	Pos	Nationality	College/Junior/Club team (League)
2	53	Nicholas Robertson	LW	United States	Peterborough Petes (OHL)
3	84	Mikko Kokkonen	D	Finland	Mikkelin Jukurit (Liiga)
4	115	Mikhail Abramov	C	Russia	Victoriaville Tigres (QMJHL)
4^{1}	124	Nick Abruzzese	C	United States	Chicago Steel (USHL)
5	146	Michael Koster	D	United States	Chaska (USHS)
7^{2}	204	Kalle Loponen	D	Finland	Oulun Kärpät U20 (Nuorten SM-liiga)

=== Notes ===
1. The St. Louis Blues' fourth-round pick went to the Toronto Maple Leafs as the result of a trade on February 15, 2018, that sent Nikita Soshnikov to St. Louis in exchange for this pick.
2. The Dallas Stars' seventh-round pick went to the Toronto Maple Leafs as the result of a trade on October 1, 2018, that sent Connor Carrick to Dallas in exchange for this pick (being conditional at the time of the trade).
