= 2019–20 Montreal Canadiens season =

NHL hockey team season

2019–20 Montreal Canadiens
- Division: 5th Atlantic
- Conference: 12th Eastern
- 2019–20 record: 31–31–9
- Home record: 14–17–6
- Road record: 17–14–3
- Goals for: 212
- Goals against: 221

Team information
- General manager: Marc Bergevin
- Coach: Claude Julien; Kirk Muller (interim, Aug. 13 – Aug. 21)
- Captain: Shea Weber
- Alternate captains: Paul Byron; Brendan Gallagher
- Arena: Bell Centre
- Average attendance: 21,085
- Minor league affiliate: Laval Rocket (AHL)

Team leaders
- Goals: Brendan Gallagher; Tomas Tatar (22)
- Assists: Tomas Tatar (39)
- Points: Tomas Tatar (61)
- Penalty minutes: Ben Chiarot (61)
- Plus/minus: Phillip Danault (+18)
- Wins: Carey Price (27)
- Goals against average: Cayden Primeau (2.52)

The 2019–20 Montreal Canadiens season was the 111th season for the franchise that was established on December 4, 1909, and their 103rd season as a franchise in the National Hockey League (NHL).

As a result of the ongoing COVID-19 pandemic, the season was suspended by league officials on March 12, 2020, after several other professional and collegiate sports organizations likewise followed suit. On May 26, the NHL regular season was officially declared over with all remaining games being cancelled. The Canadiens would advance to the playoffs for the first time since the 2016–17 season, defeating the Pittsburgh Penguins in the qualifying round, but were eliminated by the Philadelphia Flyers in the first round in six games.

== Standings ==
=== Divisional standings ===
Atlantic Division
Pos	Team	GP	W	L	OTL	RW	GF	GA	GD	Pts
1	p – Boston Bruins	70	44	14	12	38	227	174	+53	100
2	Tampa Bay Lightning	70	43	21	6	35	245	195	+50	92
3	Toronto Maple Leafs	70	36	25	9	28	238	227	+11	81
4	Florida Panthers	69	35	26	8	30	231	228	+3	78
5	Montreal Canadiens	71	31	31	9	19	212	221	−9	71
6	Buffalo Sabres	69	30	31	8	22	195	217	−22	68
7	Ottawa Senators	71	25	34	12	18	191	243	−52	62
8	Detroit Red Wings	71	17	49	5	13	145	267	−122	39

Source: National Hockey League
p – Clinched Presidents' Trophy

=== Eastern Conference ===
Pos	Team	GP	W	L	OTL	RW	GF	GA	GD	PCT	Qualification
1	Boston Bruins	70	44	14	12	38	227	174	+53	.714	Advance to Seeding round-robin tournament
2	Tampa Bay Lightning	70	43	21	6	35	245	195	+50	.657	Advance to Seeding round-robin tournament
3	Washington Capitals	69	41	20	8	31	240	215	+25	.652	Advance to Seeding round-robin tournament
4	Philadelphia Flyers	69	41	21	7	31	232	196	+36	.645	Advance to Seeding round-robin tournament
5	Pittsburgh Penguins	69	40	23	6	29	224	196	+28	.623	Advance to 2020 Stanley Cup playoffs qualifying round
6	Carolina Hurricanes	68	38	25	5	27	222	193	+29	.596	Advance to 2020 Stanley Cup playoffs qualifying round
7	New York Islanders	68	35	23	10	24	192	193	−1	.588	Advance to 2020 Stanley Cup playoffs qualifying round
8	Toronto Maple Leafs	70	36	25	9	28	238	227	+11	.579	Advance to 2020 Stanley Cup playoffs qualifying round
9	Columbus Blue Jackets	70	33	22	15	25	180	187	−7	.579	Advance to 2020 Stanley Cup playoffs qualifying round
10	Florida Panthers	69	35	26	8	30	231	228	+3	.565	Advance to 2020 Stanley Cup playoffs qualifying round
11	New York Rangers	70	37	28	5	31	234	222	+12	.564	Advance to 2020 Stanley Cup playoffs qualifying round
12	Montreal Canadiens	71	31	31	9	19	212	221	−9	.500	Advance to 2020 Stanley Cup playoffs qualifying round
13	Buffalo Sabres	69	30	31	8	22	195	217	−22	.493	
14	New Jersey Devils	69	28	29	12	22	189	230	−41	.493	
15	Ottawa Senators	71	25	34	12	18	191	243	−52	.437	
16	Detroit Red Wings	71	17	49	5	13	145	267	−122	.275	

Source: National Hockey League

== Schedule and results ==
=== Preseason ===
The preseason schedule was published on June 18, 2019.

2019 preseason game log: 5–2–0 (Home: 4–1–0; Road: 1–1–0)
#	Date	Visitor	Score	Home	OT	Decision	Attendance	Record	Recap
1	September 16	New Jersey	2–4	Montreal		Primeau	19,080	1–0–0
2	September 18^{[a]}	Florida	3–4	Montreal		Lindgren	3,500	2–0–0
3	September 19	Florida	4–5	Montreal	SO	Price	19,101	3–0–0
4	September 21	Montreal	4–0	Ottawa		Kinkaid	11,185	4–0–0
5	September 23	Toronto	3–0	Montreal		Lindgren	–	4–1–0
6	September 25	Montreal	0–3	Toronto		Kinkaid	18,863	4–2–0
7	September 28	Ottawa	3–4	Montreal	OT	Price	20,746	5–2–0
Notes:^{a} Game played at K. C. Irving Regional Centre in Bathurst, New Brunswick as part of Kraft Hockeyville.

=== Regular season ===
The regular season schedule was released on June 25, 2019.

2019–20 game log

October: 7–4–2 (Home: 3–3–0; Road: 4–1–2)
#	Date	Visitor	Score	Home	OT	Decision	Attendance	Record	Pts	Recap
1	October 3	Montreal	3–4	Carolina	SO	Price	18,680	0–0–1	1
2	October 5	Montreal	6–5	Toronto	SO	Price	19,547	1–0–1	3
3	October 9	Montreal	4–5	Buffalo	OT	Kinkaid	15,383	1–0–2	4
4	October 10	Detroit	4–2	Montreal		Price	21,302	1–1–2	4
5	October 12	St. Louis	3–6	Montreal		Price	21,302	2–1–2	6
6	October 15	Tampa Bay	3–1	Montreal		Price	20,406	2–2–2	6
7	October 17	Minnesota	0–4	Montreal		Price	20,419	3–2–2	8
8	October 19	Montreal	5–2	St. Louis		Price	18,096	4–2–2	10
9	October 20	Montreal	3–4	Minnesota		Kinkaid	17,344	4–3–2	10
10	October 24	San Jose	4–2	Montreal		Price	21,052	4–4–2	10
11	October 26	Toronto	2–5	Montreal		Price	21,302	5–4–2	12
12	October 30	Montreal	4–1	Arizona		Price	14,004	6–4–2	14
13	October 31	Montreal	5–4	Vegas	OT	Kinkaid	18,035	7–4–2	16

November: 4–5–4 (Home: 3–3–3; Road: 1–2–1)
#	Date	Visitor	Score	Home	OT	Decision	Attendance	Record	Pts	Recap
14	November 2	Montreal	1–4	Dallas		Price	18,532	7–5–2	16
15	November 5	Boston	4–5	Montreal		Price	21,302	8–5–2	18
16	November 7	Montreal	2–3	Philadelphia	OT	Price	16,788	8–5–3	19
17	November 9	Los Angeles	2–3	Montreal		Price	21,302	9–5–3	21
18	November 12	Columbus	2–3	Montreal	SO	Price	20,758	10–5–3	23
19	November 15	Montreal	5–2	Washington		Price	18,573	11–5–3	25
20	November 16	New Jersey	4–3	Montreal	OT	Kinkaid	21,016	11–5–4	26
21	November 19	Montreal	2–5	Columbus		Price	14,118	11–6–4	26
22	November 20	Ottawa	2–1	Montreal	OT	Price	20,862	11–6–5	27
23	November 23	NY Rangers	6–5	Montreal		Price	21,302	11–7–5	27
24	November 26	Boston	8–1	Montreal		Price	21,302	11–8–5	27
25	November 28	New Jersey	6–4	Montreal		Price	20,876	11–9–5	27
26	November 30	Philadelphia	4–3	Montreal	OT	Kinkaid	21,213	11–9–6	28

December: 7–7–0 (Home: 2–2–0; Road: 5–5–0)
#	Date	Visitor	Score	Home	OT	Decision	Attendance	Record	Pts	Recap
27	December 1	Montreal	1–3	Boston		Price	17,850	11–10–6	28
28	December 3	NY Islanders	2–4	Montreal		Price	20,440	12–10–6	30
29	December 5	Colorado	3–2	Montreal		Primeau	21,302	12–11–6	30
30	December 6	Montreal	2–1	NY Rangers		Price	17,354	13–11–6	32
31	December 10	Montreal	4–1	Pittsburgh		Price	18,422	14–11–6	34
32	December 11	Ottawa	2–3	Montreal	OT	Primeau	21,055	15–11–6	36
33	December 14	Detroit	2–1	Montreal		Price	21,302	15–12–6	36
34	December 17	Montreal	3–1	Vancouver		Price	18,788	16–12–6	38
35	December 19	Montreal	4–3	Calgary	OT	Price	19,172	17–12–6	40
36	December 21	Montreal	3–4	Edmonton		Price	18,347	17–13–6	40
37	December 23	Montreal	6–2	Winnipeg		Price	15,325	18–13–6	42
38	December 28	Montreal	4–5	Tampa Bay		Price	19,092	18–14–6	42
39	December 29	Montreal	5–6	Florida		Price	19,651	18–15–6	42
40	December 31	Montreal	1–3	Carolina		Lindgren	18,680	18–16–6	42

January: 5–6–1 (Home: 2–5–1; Road: 3–1–0)
#	Date	Visitor	Score	Home	OT	Decision	Attendance	Record	Pts	Recap
41	January 2	Tampa Bay	2–1	Montreal		Price	20,904	18–17–6	42
42	January 4	Pittsburgh	3–2	Montreal	OT	Price	21,302	18–17–7	43
43	January 6	Winnipeg	3–2	Montreal		Price	20,882	18–18–7	43
44	January 7	Montreal	3–4	Detroit		Lindgren	17,538	18–19–7	43
45	January 9	Edmonton	4–2	Montreal		Price	21,302	18–20–7	43
46	January 11	Montreal	2–1	Ottawa	OT	Price	18,088	19–20–7	45
47	January 13	Calgary	0–2	Montreal		Price	20,790	20–20–7	47
48	January 15	Chicago	4–1	Montreal		Lindgren	21,302	20–21–7	47
49	January 16	Montreal	4–1	Philadelphia		Price	17,377	21–21–7	49
50	January 18	Vegas	4–5	Montreal	SO	Price	21,302	22–21–7	51
51	January 27	Washington	4–2	Montreal		Price	21,302	22–22–7	51
52	January 30	Montreal	3–1	Buffalo		Price	16,604	23–22–7	53

February: 7–6–2 (Home: 4–3–2; Road: 3–3–0)
#	Date	Visitor	Score	Home	OT	Decision	Attendance	Record	Pts	Recap
53	February 1	Florida	0–4	Montreal		Price	21,302	24–22–7	55
54	February 2	Columbus	4–3	Montreal		Price	21,302	24–23–7	55
55	February 4	Montreal	5–4	New Jersey	SO	Lindgren	13,283	25–23–7	57
56	February 6	Anaheim	2–3	Montreal	OT	Price	20,896	26–23–7	59
57	February 8	Toronto	1–2	Montreal	OT	Price	21,302	27–23–7	61
58	February 10	Arizona	3–2	Montreal		Price	20,789	27–24–7	61
59	February 12	Montreal	1–4	Boston		Price	17,850	27–25–7	61
60	February 14	Montreal	1–4	Pittsburgh		Price	18,650	27–26–7	61
61	February 15	Dallas	4–3	Montreal	OT	Price	21,302	27–26–8	62
62	February 18	Montreal	3–4	Detroit		Price	18,947	27–27–8	62
63	February 20	Montreal	4–3	Washington	OT	Price	18,573	28–27–8	64
64	February 22	Montreal	3–0	Ottawa		Price	18,374	29–27–8	66
65	February 25	Vancouver	4–3	Montreal	OT	Price	21,187	29–27–9	67
66	February 27	NY Rangers	5–2	Montreal		Price	20,946	29–28–9	67
67	February 29	Carolina	3–4	Montreal	OT	Lindgren	21,207	30–28–9	69

March: 1–3–0 (Home: 0–1–0; Road: 1–2–0)
#	Date	Visitor	Score	Home	OT	Decision	Attendance	Record	Pts	Recap
68	March 3	Montreal	6–2	NY Islanders		Price	12,788	31–28–9	71
69	March 5	Montreal	0–4	Tampa Bay		Price	19,092	31–29–9	71
70	March 7	Montreal	1–4	Florida		Lindgren	17,873	31–30–9	71
71	March 10	Nashville	4–2	Montreal		Price	21,021	31–31–9	71

Cancelled games
#	Date	Visitor	Home
72	March 12	Buffalo	Montreal
73	March 15	Montreal	Anaheim
74	March 17	Montreal	Los Angeles
75	March 19	Montreal	San Jose
76	March 21	Montreal	Colorado
77	March 24	Buffalo	Montreal
78	March 26	Florida	Montreal
79	March 28	NY Islanders	Montreal
80	March 31	Montreal	Chicago
81	April 1	Montreal	Nashville
82	April 4	Montreal	Toronto

Legend: Win (2 points) Loss (0 points) Overtime/shootout loss (1 point)

=== Playoffs ===
The Canadiens defeated the Pittsburgh Penguins in the qualifying round in four games.

The Canadiens faced the Philadelphia Flyers in the first round, but were eliminated in six games.

2020 Stanley Cup playoffs

Eastern Conference Qualifying Round vs. (5) Pittsburgh Penguins: Montreal won 3–1
#	Date	Visitor	Score	Home	OT	Decision	Series	Recap
1	August 1	Montreal	3–2	Pittsburgh	OT	Price	1–0
2	August 3	Montreal	1–3	Pittsburgh		Price	1–1
3	August 5	Pittsburgh	3–4	Montreal		Price	2–1
4	August 7	Pittsburgh	0–2	Montreal		Price	3–1

Eastern Conference First Round vs. (1) Philadelphia Flyers: Philadelphia won 4–2
#	Date	Visitor	Score	Home	OT	Decision	Series	Recap
1	August 12	Montreal	1–2	Philadelphia		Price	0–1
2	August 14	Montreal	5–0	Philadelphia		Price	1–1
3	August 16	Philadelphia	1–0	Montreal		Price	1–2
4	August 18	Philadelphia	2–0	Montreal		Price	1–3
5	August 19	Montreal	5–3	Philadelphia		Price	2–3
6	August 21	Philadelphia	3–2	Montreal		Price	2–4

Legend: Win Loss

== Player statistics ==
=== Skaters ===
Regular season
Player	GP	G	A	Pts	+/−	PIM
Tomas Tatar	68	22	39	61	5	36
Phillip Danault	71	13	34	47	18	32
Max Domi	71	17	27	44	−3	35
Brendan Gallagher	59	22	21	43	9	29
Nick Suzuki	71	13	28	41	−15	6
Jeff Petry	71	11	29	40	−10	26
Shea Weber	65	15	21	36	8	33
Joel Armia	58	16	14	30	2	28
Artturi Lehkonen	70	13	14	27	2	24
Nick Cousins^{‡}	58	9	13	22	1	33
Ben Chiarot	69	9	12	21	5	61
Jordan Weal	49	8	7	15	−8	14
Jonathan Drouin	27	7	8	15	−6	14
Nate Thompson^{‡}	63	4	10	14	−2	21
Ilya Kovalchuk^{†‡}	22	6	7	13	6	2
Victor Mete	51	4	7	11	5	20
Paul Byron	29	4	6	10	5	4
Jesperi Kotkaniemi	36	6	2	8	−11	23
Brett Kulak	56	0	7	7	−1	12
Dale Weise	23	1	4	5	1	16
Mike Reilly^{‡}	14	0	4	4	2	6
Jake Evans	13	2	1	3	1	0
Marco Scandella^{†‡}	20	1	2	3	1	8
Christian Folin	16	1	1	2	−1	13
Charles Hudon	15	1	1	2	−9	0
Ryan Poehling	27	1	1	2	−4	4
Xavier Ouellet	12	0	2	2	0	4
Lukas Vejdemo	7	1	0	1	0	0
Cale Fleury	41	1	0	1	−4	6
Karl Alzner	4	0	0	0	−1	0
Gustav Olofsson	3	0	0	0	−4	2
Otto Leskinen	5	0	0	0	0	0
Matthew Peca^{‡}	5	0	0	0	−2	0
Riley Barber^{‡}	9	0	0	0	−1	2

Playoffs
Player	GP	G	A	Pts	+/−	PIM
Nick Suzuki	10	4	3	7	3	0
Jonathan Drouin	10	1	6	7	3	8
Shea Weber	10	3	2	5	3	16
Joel Armia	10	3	2	5	5	10
Jesperi Kotkaniemi	10	4	0	4	4	23
Paul Byron	10	1	3	4	4	6
Artturi Lehkonen	10	1	3	4	4	8
Brendan Gallagher	9	1	3	4	−1	2
Jeff Petry	10	2	1	3	1	6
Phillip Danault	10	1	2	3	−1	6
Brett Kulak	10	0	3	3	2	0
Max Domi	10	0	3	3	−2	8
Tomas Tatar	10	2	0	2	−1	4
Victor Mete	10	0	2	2	1	2
Ben Chiarot	10	0	2	2	2	12
Alex Belzile	6	0	1	1	1	0
Jake Evans	6	0	1	1	−1	0
Xavier Ouellet	10	0	1	1	2	14
Charles Hudon	2	0	0	0	0	0
Dale Weise	5	0	0	0	−1	2
Jordan Weal	2	0	0	0	0	0

=== Goaltenders ===
Regular season
Player	GP	GS	TOI	W	L	OT	GA	GAA	SA	SV%	SO	G	A	PIM
Carey Price	58	58	3,439:49	27	25	6	160	2.79	1,755	.909	4	0	0	6
Charlie Lindgren	6	6	360:51	2	4	0	20	3.33	178	.888	0	0	0	0
Cayden Primeau	2	2	119:06	1	1	0	5	2.52	72	.931	0	0	0	0
Keith Kinkaid	6	5	339:59	1	1	3	24	4.24	192	.875	0	0	0	0

Playoffs
Player	GP	GS	TOI	W	L	GA	GAA	SA	SV%	SO	G	A	PIM
Carey Price	10	10	605:32	5	5	18	1.78	282	.936	2	0	0	0

^{†}Denotes player spent time with another team before joining the Canadiens. Stats reflect time with the Canadiens only.
^{‡}Denotes player was traded mid-season. Stats reflect time with the Canadiens only.
Bold/italics denotes franchise record.

== Suspensions/fines ==
Player	Explanation	Length	Salary	Date issued	Ref
Nick Cousins	Boarding Red Wings defenceman Mike Green	N/A	$2,688.17	January 8, 2020	
Claude Julien	Inappropriate comments against officials during a postgame press conference	N/A	$10,000.00	February 17, 2020	

== Awards and honours ==
=== Awards ===
Regular season
Player	Award	Awarded	Ref
Shea Weber	NHL All-Star Game selection	December 30, 2019	
Nick Suzuki	NHL All-Rookie Team selection	September 21, 2020	

=== Milestones ===
Regular season
Player	Milestone	Reached	Ref
Cale Fleury	1st career NHL game	October 3, 2019	
Nick Suzuki	1st career NHL game	October 3, 2019	
Nick Suzuki	1st career NHL assist 1st career NHL point	October 9, 2019	
Nate Thompson	700th career NHL game	October 9, 2019	
Jonathan Drouin	200th career NHL point	October 12, 2019	
Victor Mete	1st career NHL goal	October 17, 2019	
Nick Suzuki	1st career NHL goal	October 17, 2019	
Brendan Gallagher	300th career NHL point	October 20, 2019	
Brendan Gallagher	500th career NHL game	October 30, 2019	
Tomas Tatar	300th career NHL point	November 9, 2019	
Shea Weber	100th career NHL powerplay goal	November 9, 2019	
Phillip Danault	100th career NHL assist	November 16, 2019	
Cale Fleury	1st career NHL goal 1st career NHL point	November 16, 2019	
Otto Leskinen	1st career NHL game	December 5, 2019	
Cayden Primeau	1st career NHL game	December 5, 2019	
Phillip Danault	300th career NHL game	December 11, 2019	
Cayden Primeau	1st career NHL win	December 11, 2019	
Joel Armia	100th career NHL point	December 17, 2019	
Jordan Weal	200th career NHL game	December 29, 2019	
Lukas Vejdemo	1st career NHL game	December 31, 2019	
Artturi Lehkonen	100th career NHL point	January 4, 2020	
Ilya Kovalchuk	900th career NHL game	January 9, 2020	
Nick Cousins	300th career NHL game	January 13, 2020	
Dale Weise	500th career NHL game	January 27, 2020	
Ryan Poehling	1st career NHL assist	February 4, 2020	
Jake Evans	1st career NHL game	February 6, 2020	
Brett Kulak	200th career NHL game	February 8, 2020	
Jake Evans	1st career NHL goal 1st career NHL point	February 10, 2020	
Lukas Vejdemo	1st career NHL goal 1st career NHL point	March 10, 2020	
Jake Evans	1st career NHL assist	March 10, 2020	

Playoffs
Player	Milestone	Reached
Max Domi	1st career Playoff game	August 1, 2020
Jesperi Kotkaniemi	1st career Playoff game 1st career Playoff goal 1st career Playoff point	August 1, 2020
Brett Kulak	1st career Playoff game 1st career Playoff assist 1st career Playoff point	August 1, 2020
Victor Mete	1st career Playoff game	August 1, 2020
Nick Suzuki	1st career Playoff game 1st career Playoff goal 1st career Playoff point	August 1, 2020
Nick Suzuki	1st career Playoff assist	August 5, 2020
Alex Belzile	1st career Playoff game	August 7, 2020
Paul Byron	1st career Playoff assist	August 7, 2020
Alex Belzile	1st career Playoff assist 1st career Playoff point	August 14, 2020
Max Domi	1st career Playoff assist 1st career Playoff point	August 14, 2020
Jake Evans	1st career Playoff game 1st career Playoff assist 1st career Playoff point	August 14, 2020
Victor Mete	1st career Playoff assist 1st career Playoff point	August 14, 2020
Phillip Danault	1st career Playoff goal	August 19, 2020
Charles Hudon	1st career Playoff game	August 19, 2020
Xavier Ouellet	1st career Playoff assist	August 19, 2020

== Transactions ==
The Canadiens have been involved in the following transactions during the 2019–20 season.

=== Trades ===
Date	Details		Ref
June 22, 2019	To Florida Panthers CHI's 5th-round pick in 2019	To Montreal Canadiens 5th-round pick in 2020	
June 22, 2019	To San Jose Sharks 4th-round pick in 2019	To Montreal Canadiens 4th-round pick in 2020	
June 22, 2019	To Philadelphia Flyers 7th-round pick in 2020	To Montreal Canadiens 7th-round pick in 2019	
June 22, 2019	To Los Angeles Kings CBJ's 2nd-round pick in 2019	To Montreal Canadiens 3rd-round pick in 2019; 5th-round pick in 2019	
June 30, 2019	To Chicago Blackhawks Andrew Shaw; 7th-round pick in 2021	To Montreal Canadiens 2nd-round pick in 2020; 7th-round pick in 2020; 3rd-round pick in 2021	
June 30, 2019	To Anaheim Ducks Nicolas Deslauriers	To Montreal Canadiens 4th-round pick in 2020	
January 2, 2020	To Buffalo Sabres SJ's 4th-round pick in 2020	To Montreal Canadiens Marco Scandella	
January 2, 2020	To Ottawa Senators Mike Reilly	To Montreal Canadiens Andrew Sturtz; 5th-round pick in 2021	
January 7, 2020	To Nashville Predators Michael McCarron	To Montreal Canadiens Laurent Dauphin	
February 18, 2020	To St. Louis Blues Marco Scandella	To Montreal Canadiens 2nd-round pick in 2020; Conditional 4th-round pick in 2021	
February 20, 2020	To Pittsburgh Penguins Riley Barber; Phil Varone	To Montreal Canadiens Joseph Blandisi; Jake Lucchini	
February 23, 2020	To Washington Capitals Ilya Kovalchuk	To Montreal Canadiens 3rd-round pick in 2020	
February 24, 2020	To Philadelphia Flyers Nate Thompson	To Montreal Canadiens 5th-round pick in 2021	
February 24, 2020	To Ottawa Senators Matthew Peca	To Montreal Canadiens Aaron Luchuk; 7th-round pick in 2020	
February 24, 2020	To Vegas Golden Knights Nick Cousins	To Montreal Canadiens 4th-round pick in 2021	
September 2, 2020	To St. Louis Blues WSH's 3rd-round pick in 2020; CHI's 7th-round pick in 2020	To Montreal Canadiens Jake Allen; 7th-round pick in 2022	
September 12, 2020	To Carolina Hurricanes 5th-round pick in 2020	To Montreal Canadiens Joel Edmundson	

=== Free agents ===
Date	Player	Team	Contract term	Ref
July 1, 2019	Riley Barber	from Washington Capitals	1-year	
July 1, 2019	Keith Kinkaid	from New Jersey Devils	1-year	
July 1, 2019	Brett Lernout	to Vegas Golden Knights	1-year	
July 3, 2019	Phil Varone	from Philadelphia Flyers	1-year	
July 4, 2019	Ben Chiarot	from Winnipeg Jets	3-year	
July 5, 2019	Nick Cousins	from Arizona Coyotes	1-year	
July 18, 2019	Hunter Shinkaruk	to Charlotte Checkers (AHL)	1-year	
September 13, 2019	Daniel Audette	to Springfield Thunderbirds (AHL)	1-year	
January 3, 2020	Ilya Kovalchuk	from Los Angeles Kings	1-year	
April 21, 2020	Vasili Demchenko	from Metallurg Magnitogorsk (KHL)	1-year	

=== Contract terminations ===
Date	Player	Via	Ref
December 7, 2019	David Sklenicka	Mutual termination	

=== Signings ===
Date	Player	Contract term	Ref
July 11, 2019	Joel Armia	2-year	
July 11, 2019	Artturi Lehkonen	2-year	
July 19, 2019	Charles Hudon	1-year	
July 27, 2019	Michael McCarron	1-year	
March 19, 2020	Alex Belzile	1-year	
March 25, 2020	Gustav Olofsson	1-year	
March 26, 2020	Jesse Ylonen	3-year	
April 3, 2020	Laurent Dauphin	1-year	
May 1, 2020	Arsen Khisamutdinov	2-year	
May 12, 2020	Cam Hillis	3-year	
July 13, 2020	Alexander Romanov	3-year	
September 4, 2020	Lukas Vejdemo	1-year	
September 16, 2020	Joel Edmundson	4-year	
September 23, 2020	Jake Evans	2-year	
September 25, 2020	Joseph Blandisi	1-year	
September 25, 2020	Jeff Petry	4-year	
September 28, 2020	Jake Lucchini	1-year	

== Draft picks ==
Below are the Montreal Canadiens' selections at the 2019 NHL entry draft, which was held on June 21 and 22, 2019, at Rogers Arena in Vancouver, British Columbia.

Round	#	Player	Pos	Nationality	College/Junior/Club team (League)
1	15	Cole Caufield	RW	United States	U.S. National Team Development Team (USHL)
2	46	Jayden Struble	D	United States	St. Sebastian's (USHS-Prep)
3	64^{1}	Mattias Norlinder	D	Sweden	MODO (Sweden Jrs.)
3	77	Gianni Fairbrother	D	Canada	Everett Silvertips (WHL)
5	126^{2}	Jacob LeGuerrier	D	Canada	Sault Ste. Marie Greyhounds (OHL)
5	131^{3}	Rhett Pitlick	LW	United States	Chaska (USHS-MN)
5	138^{4}	Frederik Nissen Dichow	G	Denmark	Vojens (Denmark Jrs.)
6	170	Arsen Khisamutdinov	C	Russia	JHC Reaktor (MHL)
7	201^{5}	Rafael Harvey-Pinard	LW	Canada	Rouyn-Noranda Huskies (QMJHL)
7	206^{6}	Kieran Ruscheinski	D	Canada	Calgary Northstars (AMHL)

=== Notes ===
1. The Los Angeles Kings' third-round pick went to the Montreal Canadiens as the result of a trade on June 22, 2019, that sent Columbus' second-round pick in 2019 (50th overall) to Los Angeles in exchange for a fifth-round pick in 2019 (126th overall) and this pick.
2. The Los Angeles Kings' fifth-round pick went to the Montreal Canadiens as the result of a trade on June 22, 2019 that sent Columbus' second-round pick in 2019 (50th overall) to Los Angeles in exchange for a third-round pick in 2019 (64th overall) and this pick
3. The Edmonton Oilers' fifth-round pick went to the Montreal Canadiens as the result of a trade on June 23, 2018, that sent Hayden Hawkey to Edmonton in exchange for this pick.
4. The Arizona Coyotes' fifth-round pick went to the Montreal Canadiens as the result of a trade on February 11, 2019, that sent Calgary's fourth-round pick in 2019 to Los Angeles in exchange for Nate Thompson and this pick.
  Los Angeles previously acquired this pick as the result of a trade on January 24, 2019, that sent Dominik Kubalik to Chicago in exchange for this pick.
  Chicago previously acquired this pick as the result of a trade on July 12, 2018 that sent Marian Hossa, Vinnie Hinostroza, Jordan Oesterle, and a third-round pick in 2019 to Arizona in exchange for Marcus Kruger, MacKenzie Entwistle, Jordan Maletta, Andrew Campbell, and this pick.
5. The Montreal Canadiens' seventh-round pick was re-acquired as the result of a trade on June 22, 2019, that sent a seventh-round pick in 2020 to Philadelphia in exchange for this pick.
  Philadelphia previously acquired this pick as the result of a trade on June 23, 2018, that sent Montreal's seventh-round pick in 2018 to Montreal in exchange for this pick.
6. The Winnipeg Jets' seventh-round pick went to the Montreal Canadiens as the result of a trade on June 30, 2018, that sent Simon Bourque to Winnipeg in exchange for Steve Mason, Joel Armia, a fourth-round pick in 2020, and this pick.
