= 2019–20 Philadelphia Flyers season =

NHL hockey team season

2019–20 Philadelphia Flyers
- Division: 2nd Metropolitan
- Conference: 4th Eastern
- 2019–20 record: 41–21–7
- Home record: 25–6–4
- Road record: 16–15–3
- Goals for: 232
- Goals against: 196

Team information
- General manager: Chuck Fletcher
- Coach: Alain Vigneault
- Captain: Claude Giroux
- Alternate captains: Sean Couturier; Kevin Hayes; Jakub Voracek
- Arena: Wells Fargo Center
- Average attendance: 18,390
- Minor league affiliates: Lehigh Valley Phantoms (AHL); Reading Royals (ECHL)

Team leaders
- Goals: Travis Konecny (24)
- Assists: Jakub Voracek (44)
- Points: Travis Konecny (61)
- Penalty minutes: Joel Farabee (39)
- Plus/minus: Sean Couturier (+21)
- Wins: Carter Hart (24)
- Goals against average: Carter Hart (2.42)

The 2019–20 Philadelphia Flyers season was the 53rd season for the National Hockey League (NHL) franchise that was established on June 5, 1967. This is also the first season with head coach Alain Vigneault.

The season was suspended by the league officials on March 12, 2020, after several other professional and collegiate sports organizations followed suit as a result of the ongoing COVID-19 pandemic. On May 26, the NHL regular season was officially declared over with the remaining games being cancelled. The Flyers returned to the playoffs after missing them in the 2018–19 season and played in a round-robin tournament, capturing the first seed for the playoffs for the first time since the 1999–2000 season. The Flyers defeated the Montreal Canadiens in the first round, but were defeated in seven games by the New York Islanders in the second round.

== Standings ==
=== Divisional standings ===
Metropolitan Division
Pos	Team	GP	W	L	OTL	RW	GF	GA	GD	Pts
1	Washington Capitals	69	41	20	8	31	240	215	+25	90
2	Philadelphia Flyers	69	41	21	7	31	232	196	+36	89
3	Pittsburgh Penguins	69	40	23	6	29	224	196	+28	86
4	Carolina Hurricanes	68	38	25	5	27	222	193	+29	81
5	Columbus Blue Jackets	70	33	22	15	25	180	187	−7	81
6	New York Islanders	68	35	23	10	24	192	193	−1	80
7	New York Rangers	70	37	28	5	31	234	222	+12	79
8	New Jersey Devils	69	28	29	12	22	189	230	−41	68

Source: National Hockey League

=== Eastern Conference ===
Pos	Team	GP	W	L	OTL	RW	GF	GA	GD	PCT	Qualification
1	Boston Bruins	70	44	14	12	38	227	174	+53	.714	Advance to Seeding round-robin tournament
2	Tampa Bay Lightning	70	43	21	6	35	245	195	+50	.657	Advance to Seeding round-robin tournament
3	Washington Capitals	69	41	20	8	31	240	215	+25	.652	Advance to Seeding round-robin tournament
4	Philadelphia Flyers	69	41	21	7	31	232	196	+36	.645	Advance to Seeding round-robin tournament
5	Pittsburgh Penguins	69	40	23	6	29	224	196	+28	.623	Advance to 2020 Stanley Cup playoffs qualifying round
6	Carolina Hurricanes	68	38	25	5	27	222	193	+29	.596	Advance to 2020 Stanley Cup playoffs qualifying round
7	New York Islanders	68	35	23	10	24	192	193	−1	.588	Advance to 2020 Stanley Cup playoffs qualifying round
8	Toronto Maple Leafs	70	36	25	9	28	238	227	+11	.579	Advance to 2020 Stanley Cup playoffs qualifying round
9	Columbus Blue Jackets	70	33	22	15	25	180	187	−7	.579	Advance to 2020 Stanley Cup playoffs qualifying round
10	Florida Panthers	69	35	26	8	30	231	228	+3	.565	Advance to 2020 Stanley Cup playoffs qualifying round
11	New York Rangers	70	37	28	5	31	234	222	+12	.564	Advance to 2020 Stanley Cup playoffs qualifying round
12	Montreal Canadiens	71	31	31	9	19	212	221	−9	.500	Advance to 2020 Stanley Cup playoffs qualifying round
13	Buffalo Sabres	69	30	31	8	22	195	217	−22	.493	
14	New Jersey Devils	69	28	29	12	22	189	230	−41	.493	
15	Ottawa Senators	71	25	34	12	18	191	243	−52	.437	
16	Detroit Red Wings	71	17	49	5	13	145	267	−122	.275	

Source: National Hockey League

== Schedule and results ==
=== Preseason ===
The preseason schedule was published on June 18, 2019.

2019 preseason
Preseason: 1–3–3 (home: 1–2–0; road: 0–1–3)

Game	Date	Visitor	Score	Home	OT	Decision	Attendance	Record	Recap
1	September 16	NY Islanders	3–1	Philadelphia		Elliott	16,570	0–1–0	L
2	September 17	Philadelphia	2–3	NY Islanders	OT	Berube	–	0–1–1	OTL
3	September 19	Boston	3–1	Philadelphia		Elliott	16,826	0–2–1	L
4	September 21	NY Rangers	1–4	Philadelphia		Hart	17,699	1–2–1	W
5	September 23	Philadelphia	3–4	Boston	OT	Elliott	17,565	1–2–2	OTL
6	September 26	Philadelphia	1–2	NY Rangers	SO	Hart	16,260	1–2–3	OTL
7^{[a]}	September 30	Philadelphia	3–4	Lausanne HC		Hart	–	1–3–3	L
Notes:^{a} Game was played in Lausanne, Switzerland.

Legend: W Win (2 points) L Loss (0 points) OTL Overtime/shootout loss (1 point)

=== Regular season ===
The regular season schedule was published on June 25, 2019.

2019–20 regular season
October: 5–5–1 (home: 4–1–0; road: 1–4–1)

Game	Date	Visitor	Score	Home	OT	Decision	Attendance	Record	Points	Recap
1^{[a]}	October 4	Chicago	3–4	Philadelphia		Hart	17,463	1–0–0	2	W
2	October 9	New Jersey	0–4	Philadelphia		Hart	19,658	2–0–0	4	W
3	October 12	Philadelphia	2–3	Vancouver	SO	Hart	18,652	2–0–1	5	OTL
4	October 15	Philadelphia	1–3	Calgary		Elliott	17,771	2–1–1	5	L
5	October 16	Philadelphia	3–6	Edmonton		Hart	17,107	2–2–1	5	L
6	October 19	Dallas	4–1	Philadelphia		Hart	18,003	2–3–1	5	L
7	October 21	Vegas	2–6	Philadelphia		Elliott	16,780	3–3–1	7	W
8	October 24	Philadelphia	4–1	Chicago		Elliott	21,315	4–3–1	9	W
9	October 26	Columbus	4–7	Philadelphia		Elliott	17,840	5–3–1	11	W
10	October 27	Philadelphia	3–5	NY Islanders		Hart	12,055	5–4–1	11	L
11	October 29	Philadelphia	1–7	Pittsburgh		Elliott	18,560	5–5–1	11	L
Notes:^{a} Game was played at O2 Arena in Prague, Czech Republic.

November: 10–2–4 (home: 4–0–4; road: 6–2–0)

Game	Date	Visitor	Score	Home	OT	Decision	Attendance	Record	Points	Recap
12	November 1	Philadelphia	4–3	New Jersey	SO	Hart	14,624	6–5–1	13	W
13	November 2	Toronto	4–3	Philadelphia	SO	Elliott	18,441	6–5–2	14	OTL
14	November 5	Carolina	1–4	Philadelphia		Hart	16,172	7–5–2	16	W
15	November 7	Montreal	2–3	Philadelphia	OT	Hart	16,788	8–5–2	18	W
16	November 9	Philadelphia	3–2	Toronto	SO	Elliott	19,279	9–5–2	20	W
17	November 10	Philadelphia	3–2	Boston	SO	Hart	17,193	10–5–2	22	W
18	November 13	Washington	2–1	Philadelphia	SO	Hart	18,159	10–5–3	23	OTL
19	November 15	Philadelphia	1–2	Ottawa		Hart	10,664	10–6–3	23	L
20	November 16	NY Islanders	4–3	Philadelphia	SO	Elliott	19,023	10–6–4	24	OTL
21	November 19	Philadelphia	2–5	Florida		Hart	11,515	10–7–4	24	L
22	November 21	Philadelphia	5–3	Carolina		Elliott	14,734	11–7–4	26	W
23	November 23	Calgary	3–2	Philadelphia	SO	Hart	17,198	11–7–5	27	OTL
24	November 25	Vancouver	1–2	Philadelphia		Hart	17,083	12–7–5	29	W
25	November 27	Philadelphia	3–2	Columbus		Elliott	14,975	13–7–5	31	W
26	November 29	Detroit	1–6	Philadelphia		Hart	18,566	14–7–5	33	W
27	November 30	Philadelphia	4–3	Montreal	OT	Elliott	21,213	15–7–5	35	W

December: 7–6–0 (home: 5–1–0; road: 2–5–0)

Game	Date	Visitor	Score	Home	OT	Decision	Attendance	Record	Points	Recap
28	December 3	Toronto	1–6	Philadelphia		Hart	15,811	16–7–5	37	W
29	December 5	Arizona	3–1	Philadelphia		Elliott	17,440	16–8–5	37	L
30	December 7	Ottawa	3–4	Philadelphia		Hart	18,031	17–8–5	39	W
31	December 11	Philadelphia	1–3	Colorado		Hart	17,905	17–9–5	39	L
32	December 14	Philadelphia	1–4	Minnesota		Hart	17,140	17–10–5	39	L
33	December 15	Philadelphia	3–7	Winnipeg		Elliott	15,325	17–11–5	39	L
34	December 17	Anaheim	1–4	Philadelphia		Hart	18,449	18–11–5	41	W
35	December 19	Buffalo	1–6	Philadelphia		Hart	18,124	19–11–5	43	W
36	December 21	Philadelphia	5–4	Ottawa	SO	Elliott	11,203	20–11–5	45	W
37	December 23	NY Rangers	1–5	Philadelphia		Hart	19,776	21–11–5	47	W
38	December 28	Philadelphia	1–6	San Jose		Hart	16,819	21–12–5	47	L
39	December 29	Philadelphia	2–1	Anaheim	OT	Elliott	16,238	22–12–5	49	W
40	December 31	Philadelphia	3–5	Los Angeles		Elliott	17,982	22–13–5	49	L

January: 5–4–2 (home: 4–2–0; road: 1–2–2)

Game	Date	Visitor	Score	Home	OT	Decision	Attendance	Record	Points	Recap
41	January 2	Philadelphia	4–5	Vegas		Hart	18,415	22–14–5	49	L
42	January 4	Philadelphia	2–6	Arizona		Hart	17,125	22–15–5	49	L
43	January 7	Philadelphia	4–5	Carolina	OT	Elliott	15,072	22–15–6	50	OTL
44	January 8	Washington	2–3	Philadelphia		Hart	18,595	23–15–6	52	W
45	January 11	Tampa Bay	1–0	Philadelphia		Hart	19,866	23–16–6	52	L
46	January 13	Boston	5–6	Philadelphia	SO	Hart	19,246	24–16–6	54	W
47	January 15	Philadelphia	4–3	St. Louis	OT	Elliott	18,096	25–16–6	56	W
48	January 16	Montreal	4–1	Philadelphia		Lyon	17,377	25–17–6	56	L
49	January 18	Los Angeles	1–4	Philadelphia		Elliott	19,602	26–17–6	58	W
50	January 21	Pittsburgh	0–3	Philadelphia		Elliott	19,120	27–17–6	60	W
51	January 31	Philadelphia	3–4	Pittsburgh	OT	Elliott	18,647	27–17–7	61	OTL

February: 10–3–0 (home: 6–1–0; road: 4–2–0)

Game	Date	Visitor	Score	Home	OT	Decision	Attendance	Record	Points	Recap
52	February 1	Colorado	3–6	Philadelphia		Lyon	19,745	28–17–7	63	W
53	February 3	Philadelphia	3–0	Detroit		Elliott	17,526	29–17–7	65	W
54	February 6	New Jersey	5–0	Philadelphia		Elliott	19,070	29–18–7	65	L
55	February 8	Philadelphia	7–2	Washington		Elliott	18,573	30–18–7	67	W
56	February 10	Florida	1–4	Philadelphia		Hart	17,867	31–18–7	69	W
57	February 11	Philadelphia	3–5	NY Islanders		Elliott	12,228	31–19–7	69	L
58	February 13	Philadelphia	6–2	Florida		Hart	15,556	32–19–7	71	W
59	February 15	Philadelphia	3–5	Tampa Bay		Hart	19,092	32–20–7	71	L
60	February 18	Columbus	1–5	Philadelphia		Hart	18,273	33–20–7	73	W
61	February 20	Philadelphia	4–3	Columbus	OT	Elliott	18,365	34–20–7	75	W
62	February 22	Winnipeg	2–4	Philadelphia		Hart	19,870	35–20–7	77	W
63	February 25	San Jose	2–4	Philadelphia		Hart	18,290	36–20–7	79	W
64	February 28	NY Rangers	2–5	Philadelphia		Hart	19,581	37–20–7	81	W

March: 4–1–0 (home: 2–1–0; road: 2–0–0)

Game	Date	Visitor	Score	Home	OT	Decision	Attendance	Record	Points	Recap
65	March 1	Philadelphia	5–3	NY Rangers		Hart	18,006	38–20–7	83	W
66	March 4	Philadelphia	5–2	Washington		Elliott	18,573	39–20–7	85	W
67	March 5	Carolina	1–4	Philadelphia		Hart	18,900	40–20–7	87	W
68	March 7	Buffalo	1–3	Philadelphia		Hart	19,781	41–20–7	89	W
69	March 10	Boston	2–0	Philadelphia		Hart	19,689	41–21–7	89	L

Cancelled games

Game	Date	Visitor	Home
70	March 12	Philadelphia	Tampa Bay
71	March 14	Minnesota	Philadelphia
72	March 15	Edmonton	Philadelphia
73	March 17	St. Louis	Philadelphia
74	March 20	Philadelphia	Dallas
75	March 21	Philadelphia	Nashville
76	March 24	NY Islanders	Philadelphia
77	March 26	Philadelphia	Detroit
78	March 28	Philadelphia	New Jersey
79	March 29	Pittsburgh	Philadelphia
80	April 1	Philadelphia	NY Rangers
81	April 2	Nashville	Philadelphia
82	April 4	Philadelphia	Buffalo

Legend: W Win (2 points) L Loss (0 points) OTL Overtime/shootout loss (1 point)

=== Playoffs ===
The Flyers played in a round-robin tournament to determine their seed for the playoffs. Philadelphia finished with a 3−0−0 record and clinched the first seed for the playoffs.

The Flyers faced the Montreal Canadiens in the first round, and eliminated them in six games, winning their first playoff series since the 2011–2012 season.

In the second round, the Flyers faced the New York Islanders, but lost in seven games.

2020 Stanley Cup playoffs
Eastern Conference seeding round-robin

Game	Date	Visitor	Score	Home	OT	Decision	Record	Points	Recap
1	August 2	Philadelphia	4–1	Boston		Hart	1–0–0	2	W
2	August 6	Washington	1–3	Philadelphia		Elliott	2–0–0	4	W
3	August 8	Philadelphia	4–1	Tampa Bay		Hart	3–0–0	6	W

Eastern Conference First Round vs. (8) Montreal Canadiens: Philadelphia won 4–2

Game	Date	Visitor	Score	Home	OT	Decision	Series	Recap
1	August 12	Montreal	1–2	Philadelphia		Hart	1–0	W
2	August 14	Montreal	5–0	Philadelphia		Hart	1–1	L
3	August 16	Philadelphia	1–0	Montreal		Hart	2–1	W
4	August 18	Philadelphia	2–0	Montreal		Hart	3–1	W
5	August 19	Montreal	5–3	Philadelphia		Hart	3–2	L
6	August 21	Philadelphia	3–2	Montreal		Hart	4–2	W

Eastern Conference Second Round vs. (6) New York Islanders: New York won 4–3

Game	Date	Visitor	Score	Home	OT	Decision	Series	Recap
1	August 24	NY Islanders	4–0	Philadelphia		Hart	0–1	L
2	August 26	NY Islanders	3–4	Philadelphia	OT	Hart	1–1	W
3	August 29	Philadelphia	1–3	NY Islanders		Hart	1–2	L
4	August 30	Philadelphia	2–3	NY Islanders		Elliott	1–3	L
5	September 1	NY Islanders	3–4	Philadelphia	OT	Hart	2–3	W
6	September 3	Philadelphia	5–4	NY Islanders	2OT	Hart	3–3	W
7	September 5	NY Islanders	4–0	Philadelphia		Hart	3–4	L

Legend: W Win L Loss

== Player statistics ==
=== Skaters ===
Regular season
Player	GP	G	A	Pts	+/−	PIM
Travis Konecny	66	24	37	61	−1	28
Sean Couturier	69	22	37	59	21	30
Jakub Voracek	69	12	44	56	14	31
Claude Giroux	69	21	32	53	7	28
Kevin Hayes	69	23	18	41	−6	34
James van Riemsdyk	66	19	21	40	5	8
Ivan Provorov	69	13	23	36	11	24
Matt Niskanen	68	8	25	33	15	29
Scott Laughton	49	13	14	27	13	26
Travis Sanheim	69	8	17	25	4	32
Joel Farabee	52	8	13	21	6	39
Michael Raffl	58	8	12	20	−2	14
Tyler Pitlick	63	8	12	20	11	12
Justin Braun	62	3	16	19	−2	18
Oskar Lindblom	30	11	7	18	4	4
Philippe Myers	50	4	12	16	17	30
Nicolas Aube-Kubel	36	7	8	15	1	19
Robert Hagg	49	3	10	13	14	30
Shayne Gostisbehere	42	5	7	12	−4	20
Morgan Frost	20	2	5	7	−3	4
Derek Grant^{†}	7	1	4	5	2	2
Mikhail Vorobyev	20	1	2	3	−5	6
Connor Bunnaman	21	1	1	2	7	2
David Kase	6	1	0	1	1	0
Carsen Twarynski	15	1	0	1	−2	4
Andy Andreoff	14	0	1	1	−3	2
Mark Friedman	6	0	1	1	0	2
Chris Stewart	16	0	1	1	−7	21
Nate Thompson^{†}	7	0	1	1	1	9
Samuel Morin	1	0	0	0	−1	0
German Rubtsov	4	0	0	0	−1	0

Playoffs
Player	GP	G	A	Pts	+/−	PIM
Kevin Hayes	16	4	9	13	7	2
Scott Laughton	15	5	4	9	2	21
Jakub Voracek	15	4	5	9	3	24
Sean Couturier	15	2	7	9	1	16
Ivan Provorov	16	3	5	8	2	4
Claude Giroux	16	1	7	8	1	2
Travis Sanheim	16	1	6	7	1	6
Travis Konecny	16	0	7	7	3	14
Michael Raffl	9	4	1	5	5	2
Joel Farabee	12	3	2	5	−2	4
Philippe Myers	16	3	1	4	2	8
Tyler Pitlick	16	2	1	3	−3	0
Nicolas Aube-Kubel	13	2	1	3	1	8
Robert Hagg	12	0	3	3	1	6
James van Riemsdyk	12	2	0	2	−3	2
Matt Niskanen	15	1	1	2	0	6
Shayne Gostisbehere	5	0	2	2	2	2
Derek Grant	15	0	2	2	−1	8
Justin Braun	16	0	2	2	0	2
Nate Thompson	16	1	0	1	−3	14
Oskar Lindblom	2	0	0	0	−1	0
Connor Bunnaman	4	0	0	0	−1	2

=== Goaltenders ===
Regular season
Player	GP	GS	TOI	W	L	OT	GA	GAA	SA	SV%	SO	G	A	PIM
Carter Hart	43	40	2,355:50	24	13	3	95	2.42	1,100	.914	1	0	0	0
Brian Elliott	31	27	1,673:54	16	7	4	80	2.87	796	.899	2	0	1	2
Alex Lyon	3	2	135:19	1	1	0	8	3.55	73	.890	0	0	0	0

Playoffs
Player	GP	GS	TOI	W	L	OT	GA	GAA	SA	SV%	SO	G	A	PIM
Carter Hart	14	14	859:38	9	5	0	32	2.23	431	.926	2	0	0	2
Brian Elliott	3	2	139:30	1	1	0	5	2.15	56	.911	0	0	0	0

^{†}Denotes player spent time with another team before joining the Flyers. Stats reflect time with the Flyers only.
^{‡}Denotes player was traded mid-season. Stats reflect time with the Flyers only.
Bold/italics denotes franchise record.

== Awards and records ==
=== Awards ===
Type	Award/honor	Recipient	Ref
League (annual)	Frank J. Selke Trophy	Sean Couturier	
League (in-season)	NHL All-Star Game selection	Travis Konecny	
League (in-season)	NHL Third Star of the Week	Brian Elliott (October 28)	
Team	Barry Ashbee Trophy	Ivan Provorov	
Team	Bobby Clarke Trophy	Sean Couturier	
Team	Gene Hart Memorial Award	Kevin Hayes	
Team	Pelle Lindbergh Memorial Trophy	Scott Laughton	
Team	Toyota Cup	Travis Konecny	
Team	Yanick Dupre Memorial Class Guy Award	Scott Laughton	

=== Records ===
Among the team records set during the 2019–20 season was tying the mark originally set in 2003 for most overtime games in a single playoff series, three, during their round two matchup with the New York Islanders.

=== Milestones ===
Milestone	Player	Date	Ref
First game	Connor Bunnaman	October 4, 2019	
First game	Carsen Twarynski	October 4, 2019	
First game	Joel Farabee	October 21, 2019	
First game	German Rubtsov	November 1, 2019	
First game	Morgan Frost	November 19, 2019	
First game	David Kase	December 11, 2019	

== Transactions ==
The Flyers were involved in the following transactions during the 2019–20 season.

=== Trades ===
Date	Details		Ref
June 21, 2019	To Arizona Coyotes: 1st-round pick in 2019	To Philadelphia Flyers: 1st-round pick in 2019; 2nd-round pick in 2019	
June 22, 2019	To Nashville Predators: ARI's 2nd-round pick in 2019; NJD's 3rd-round pick in 2019	To Philadelphia Flyers: NJD's 2nd-round pick in 2019	
June 22, 2019	To Montreal Canadiens: 7th-round pick in 2019	To Philadelphia Flyers: 7th-round pick in 2020	
June 24, 2019	To Dallas Stars: Ryan Hartman	To Philadelphia Flyers: Tyler Pitlick	
February 19, 2020	To New York Rangers: Jean-Francois Berube	To Philadelphia Flyers: Future considerations	
February 24, 2020	To Montreal Canadiens: 5th-round pick in 2021	To Philadelphia Flyers: Nate Thompson	
February 24, 2020	To Anaheim Ducks: Kyle Criscuolo; Conditional 4th-round pick in 2020 (Note: The pick will be better of the two 2020 4th-round picks the Flyers possessed at the time of the trade, their own and the one they acquired from the Nashville Predators on February 25, 2019. It turned out to be the latter.)	To Philadelphia Flyers: Derek Grant	
February 24, 2020	To Chicago Blackhawks: T. J. Brennan	To Philadelphia Flyers: Nathan Noel	

=== Players acquired ===
Date	Player	Former team	Term	Via	Ref
July 1, 2019	Andy Andreoff	Tampa Bay Lightning	2-year	Free agency	
July 1, 2019	Jean-Francois Berube	Columbus Blue Jackets	1-year	Free agency	
July 1, 2019	Chris Bigras	New York Rangers	2-year	Free agency	
July 1, 2019	Kyle Criscuolo	Buffalo Sabres	1-year	Free agency	
July 1, 2019	Kurtis Gabriel	New Jersey Devils	1-year	Free agency	
July 1, 2019	Nate Prosser	Minnesota Wild	2-year	Free agency	
July 1, 2019	Andy Welinski	Anaheim Ducks	1-year	Free agency	
July 1, 2019	Tyler Wotherspoon	St. Louis Blues	2-year	Free agency	
October 15, 2019	Chris Stewart	Nottingham Panthers (EIHL)	1-year	Free agency	
April 29, 2020	Linus Sandin	HV71 (SHL)	1-year	Free agency	

=== Players lost ===
Date	Player	New team	Term	Via (Note: In parentheses is the player's free agency group on July 1 if applicable.)	Ref
July 1, 2019	Greg Carey	Lehigh Valley Phantoms (AHL)	1-year	Free agency (III)	
July 1, 2019	Byron Froese	Calgary Flames	1-year	Free agency (III)	
July 1, 2019	Tyrell Goulbourne	Vegas Golden Knights	2-year	Free agency (VI)	
July 1, 2019	David Schlemko			Buyout	
July 1, 2019	Cam Talbot	Calgary Flames	1-year	Free agency (III)	
July 1, 2019	Mike Vecchione	St. Louis Blues	1-year	Free agency (VI)	
July 2, 2019	Cole Bardreau	New York Islanders	2-year	Free agency (VI)	
July 3, 2019	Phil Varone	Montreal Canadiens	1-year	Free agency (III)	
July 4, 2019	Justin Bailey	Vancouver Canucks	1-year	Free agency (UFA)	
August 27, 2019	Mike McKenna			Retirement (III)	
September 10, 2019	Jacob Graves	Florida Everblades (ECHL)	1-year	Free agency (UFA)	
January 23, 2020	Michal Neuvirth	HC Sparta Praha (ELH)	1-year	Free agency (III)	
June 30, 2020	Mikhail Vorobyev	Salavat Yulaev Ufa (KHL)	3-year	Free agency (Note: The Flyers retained Vorobyev's NHL rights until trading them to the Vegas Golden Knights on March 7, 2024.)	
September 28, 2020	Chris Stewart			Retirement	
October 5, 2020	Matt Niskanen			Retirement	

=== Signings ===
Date	Player	Term	Contract type	Ref
June 24, 2019	Travis Sanheim	2-year	Re-signing	
June 26, 2019	Brian Elliott	1-year	Re-signing	
July 12, 2019	Scott Laughton	2-year	Re-signing	
July 16, 2019	Nicolas Aube-Kubel	1-year	Re-signing	
September 13, 2019	Ivan Provorov	6-year	Re-signing	
September 16, 2019	Travis Konecny	6-year	Re-signing	
March 10, 2020	Wyatte Wylie	3-year	Entry-level	
March 23, 2020	Tanner Laczynski	2-year	Entry-level	
March 27, 2020	Wade Allison	2-year	Entry-level	
May 30, 2020	Linus Hogberg	2-year	Entry-level	
July 13, 2020	Mark Friedman	2-year	Extension	
July 22, 2020	Oskar Lindblom	3-year	Extension	
September 17, 2020	Nicolas Aube-Kubel	2-year	Extension	
September 25, 2020	Alex Lyon	1-year	Extension	
September 28, 2020	Robert Hagg	2-year	Extension	
October 3, 2020	Brian Elliott	1-year	Extension	
October 5, 2020	Justin Braun	2-year	Extension	

== Draft picks ==
Below are the Philadelphia Flyers' selections at the 2019 NHL entry draft, which was held on June 21 and 22, 2019, at the Rogers Arena in Vancouver, British Columbia.

Round	Pick	Player	Position	Nationality	Team (league)	Notes
1	14	Cam York	Defense	United States	U.S. National Team Development Program (USHL)	(Note: The Flyers acquired this pick and a 2019 second-round pick, 45th overall, in a trade with the Arizona Coyotes for their original 2019 first-round pick, 11th overall, on June 21, 2019.)
2	34	Bobby Brink	Right wing	United States	Sioux City Musketeers (USHL)	(Note: The Flyers acquired this pick, originally belonging to the New Jersey Devils, in a trade with the Nashville Predators for Arizona's 2019 second-round pick, 45th overall, and New Jersey's 2019 third-round pick, 65th overall, on June 22, 2019.)
3	72	Ronnie Attard	Defense	United States	Tri-City Storm (USHL)	
4	103	Mason Millman	Defense	Canada	Saginaw Spirit (OHL)	
6	165	Egor Serdyuk	Right wing	Russia	Victoriaville Tigres (QMJHL)	
6	169	Roddy Ross	Goaltender	Canada	Seattle Thunderbirds (WHL)	(Note: The Flyers acquired this pick and Jacob Graves in a trade with the Arizona Coyotes for Jordan Weal on January 11, 2019.)
7	196	Bryce Brodzinski	Right wing	United States	Blaine High School (USHS)	
