= 2019–20 Colorado Avalanche season =

Professional ice hockey team season

2019–20 Colorado Avalanche
- Division: 2nd Central
- Conference: 2nd Western
- 2019–20 record: 42–20–8
- Home record: 18–9–6
- Road record: 24–11–2
- Goals for: 237
- Goals against: 191

Team information
- General manager: Joe Sakic
- Coach: Jared Bednar
- Captain: Gabriel Landeskog
- Alternate captains: Erik Johnson; Nathan MacKinnon
- Arena: Pepsi Center
- Average attendance: 18,708
- Minor league affiliates: Colorado Eagles (AHL); Utah Grizzlies (ECHL)

Team leaders
- Goals: Nathan MacKinnon (35)
- Assists: Nathan MacKinnon (58)
- Points: Nathan MacKinnon (93)
- Penalty minutes: Nazem Kadri (97)
- Plus/minus: Ryan Graves (+40)
- Wins: Pavel Francouz (21)
- Goals against average: Michael Hutchinson (1.00)

The 2019–20 Colorado Avalanche season was the 25th operational season and 24th playing season since the franchise relocated from Quebec prior to the start of the 1995–96 NHL season. As well as the franchise's 41st season in the National Hockey League and 48th season overall. The Avalanche will commemorate their 25th anniversary in the 2020-21 season.

The season was suspended by the league officials on March 12, 2020, after several other professional and collegiate sports organizations followed suit as a result of the ongoing COVID-19 pandemic. Two of the Avalanche's players tested positive for COVID-19. On May 26, the NHL regular season was officially declared over with the remaining games being cancelled.

The Avalanche advanced to the playoffs for the third straight season, after last missing the playoffs in the 2016–17 season. In the Playoffs, the Avalanche defeated the Arizona Coyotes in five games in the first round, before losing to the Dallas Stars in seven games in the second round. The season marked a turning point in the Avalanche's history, as it started a period of extreme strength for the franchise.

== Standings ==
=== Divisional standings ===
Central Division
Pos	Team	GP	W	L	OTL	RW	GF	GA	GD	Pts
1	St. Louis Blues	71	42	19	10	33	225	193	+32	94
2	Colorado Avalanche	70	42	20	8	37	237	191	+46	92
3	Dallas Stars	69	37	24	8	26	180	177	+3	82
4	Winnipeg Jets	71	37	28	6	30	216	203	+13	80
5	Nashville Predators	69	35	26	8	28	215	217	−2	78
6	Minnesota Wild	69	35	27	7	30	220	220	0	77
7	Chicago Blackhawks	70	32	30	8	23	212	218	−6	72

Source: National Hockey League

=== Western Conference ===
Pos	Team	GP	W	L	OTL	RW	GF	GA	GD	PCT	Qualification
1	St. Louis Blues	71	42	19	10	33	225	193	+32	.662	Advance to Seeding round-robin tournament
2	Colorado Avalanche	70	42	20	8	37	237	191	+46	.657	Advance to Seeding round-robin tournament
3	Vegas Golden Knights	71	39	24	8	30	227	211	+16	.606	Advance to Seeding round-robin tournament
4	Dallas Stars	69	37	24	8	26	180	177	+3	.594	Advance to Seeding round-robin tournament
5	Edmonton Oilers	71	37	25	9	31	225	217	+8	.585	Advance to 2020 Stanley Cup playoffs qualifying round
6	Nashville Predators	69	35	26	8	28	215	217	−2	.565	Advance to 2020 Stanley Cup playoffs qualifying round
7	Vancouver Canucks	69	36	27	6	27	228	217	+11	.565	Advance to 2020 Stanley Cup playoffs qualifying round
8	Calgary Flames	70	36	27	7	25	210	215	−5	.564	Advance to 2020 Stanley Cup playoffs qualifying round
9	Winnipeg Jets	71	37	28	6	30	216	203	+13	.563	Advance to 2020 Stanley Cup playoffs qualifying round
10	Minnesota Wild	69	35	27	7	30	220	220	0	.558	Advance to 2020 Stanley Cup playoffs qualifying round
11	Arizona Coyotes	70	33	29	8	26	195	187	+8	.529	Advance to 2020 Stanley Cup playoffs qualifying round
12	Chicago Blackhawks	70	32	30	8	23	212	218	−6	.514	Advance to 2020 Stanley Cup playoffs qualifying round
13	Anaheim Ducks	71	29	33	9	20	187	226	−39	.472	
14	Los Angeles Kings	70	29	35	6	21	178	212	−34	.457	
15	San Jose Sharks	70	29	36	5	22	182	226	−44	.450	

Source: National Hockey League

Tiebreaking procedures

1. Fewer number of games played (only used during regular season).
2. Greater number of regulation wins (denoted by RW).
3. Greater number of wins in regulation and overtime (excluding shootout wins; denoted by ROW).
4. Greater number of total wins (including shootouts).
5. Greater number of points earned in head-to-head play; if teams played an uneven number of head-to-head games, the result of the first game on the home ice of the team with the extra home game is discarded.
6. Greater goal differential (difference between goals for and goals against).
7. Greater number of goals scored (denoted by GF).

== Schedule and results ==
=== Preseason ===
The preseason schedule was published on June 13, 2019.

2019 preseason game log: 2–3–1 (Home: 1–2–0; Road: 1–1–1)
#	Date	Visitor	Score	Home	OT	Decision	Attendance	Record	Recap
1	September 17	Vegas	5–0	Colorado		Werner	—	0–1–0
2	September 19	Dallas	2–1	Colorado		Grubauer	—	0–2–0
3	September 21	Colorado	3–4	Minnesota		Francouz	16,833	0–3–0
4	September 22	Minnesota	2–3	Colorado	SO	Grubauer	—	1–3–0
5	September 25	Colorado	4–1	Vegas		Francouz	17,954	2–3–0
6	September 28	Colorado	3–4	Dallas	SO	Grubauer	13,112	2–3–1

=== Regular season ===
The regular season schedule was published on June 25, 2019.

2019–20 game log

October: 8–2–2 (Home: 4–1–1; Road: 4–1–1)
#	Date	Visitor	Score	Home	OT	Decision	Attendance	Record	Pts	Recap
1	October 3	Calgary	3–5	Colorado		Grubauer	18,016	1–0–0	2
2	October 5	Minnesota	2–4	Colorado		Grubauer	17,090	2–0–0	4
3	October 10	Boston	2–4	Colorado		Grubauer	18,045	3–0–0	6
4	October 12	Arizona	2–3	Colorado	OT	Francouz	18,053	4–0–0	8
5	October 14	Colorado	6–3	Washington		Grubauer	18,573	5–0–0	10
6	October 16	Colorado	2–3	Pittsburgh	OT	Grubauer	18,458	5–0–1	11
7	October 18	Colorado	5–4	Florida	OT	Grubauer	13,382	6–0–1	13
8	October 19	Colorado	6–2	Tampa Bay		Francouz	19,092	7–0–1	15
9	October 21	Colorado	1–3	St. Louis		Grubauer	18,096	7–1–1	15
10	October 25	Colorado	6–1	Vegas		Grubauer	18,420	8–1–1	17
11	October 26	Anaheim	5–2	Colorado		Francouz	18,039	8–2–1	17
12	October 30	Florida	4–3	Colorado	OT	Grubauer	16,022	8–2–2	18

November: 8–6–0 (Home: 4–2–0; Road: 4–4–0)
#	Date	Visitor	Score	Home	OT	Decision	Attendance	Record	Pts	Recap
13	November 1	Dallas	2–1	Colorado		Grubauer	18,020	8–3–2	18
14	November 2	Colorado	0–3	Arizona		Francouz	17,125	8–4–2	18
15	November 5	Colorado	1–4	Dallas		Grubauer	18,108	8–5–2	18
16	November 7	Nashville	4–9	Colorado		Francouz	17,492	9–5–2	20
17	November 9	Columbus	2–4	Colorado		Francouz	18,070	10–5–2	22
18	November 12	Colorado	4–0	Winnipeg		Werner	15,325	11–5–2	24
19	November 14	Colorado	2–6	Edmonton		Werner	17,188	11–6–2	24
20	November 16	Colorado	5–4	Vancouver	OT	Bibeau	18,409	12–6–2	26
21	November 19	Colorado	3–2	Calgary		Grubauer	18,698	13–6–2	28
22	November 21	Colorado	2–3	Minnesota		Grubauer	17,574	13–7–2	28
23	November 23	Toronto	5–3	Colorado		Grubauer	18,137	13–8–2	28
24	November 27	Edmonton	1–4	Colorado		Grubauer	18,021	14–8–2	30
25	November 29	Colorado	5–2	Chicago		Francouz	21,822	15–8–2	32
26	November 30	Chicago	3–7	Colorado		Grubauer	18,015	16–8–2	34

December: 7–5–2 (Home: 2–4–1; Road: 5–1–1)
#	Date	Visitor	Score	Home	OT	Decision	Attendance	Record	Pts	Recap
27	December 4	Colorado	3–1	Toronto		Grubauer	19,351	17–8–2	36
28	December 5	Colorado	3–2	Montreal		Francouz	21,302	18–8–2	38
29	December 7	Colorado	4–1	Boston		Francouz	17,850	19–8–2	40
30	December 9	Calgary	5–4	Colorado	OT	Francouz	17,588	19–8–3	41
31	December 11	Philadelphia	1–3	Colorado		Francouz	17,905	20–8–3	43
32	December 13	New Jersey	1–3	Colorado		Francouz	18,034	21–8–3	45
33	December 16	Colorado	2–5	St. Louis		Grubauer	18,096	21–9–3	45
34	December 18	Colorado	4–1	Chicago		Francouz	21,481	22–9–3	47
35	December 19	Carolina	3–1	Colorado		Grubauer	18,015	22–10–3	47
36	December 21	Chicago	5–3	Colorado		Grubauer	18,056	22–11–3	47
37	December 23	Colorado	7–3	Vegas		Francouz	18,425	23–11–3	49
38	December 27	Minnesota	6–4	Colorado		Francouz	18,146	23–12–3	49
39	December 28	Colorado	2–3	Dallas	SO	Grubauer	18,532	23–12–4	50
40	December 31	Winnipeg	7–4	Colorado		Grubauer	18,147	23–13–4	50

January: 5–2–2 (Home: 4–0–2; Road: 1–2–0)
#	Date	Visitor	Score	Home	OT	Decision	Attendance	Record	Pts	Recap
41	January 2	St. Louis	3–7	Colorado		Grubauer	18,135	24–13–4	52
42	January 4	Colorado	5–2	New Jersey		Grubauer	16,514	25–13–4	54
43	January 6	Colorado	0–1	NY Islanders		Francouz	13,241	25–14–4	54
44	January 7	Colorado	3–5	NY Rangers		Grubauer	17,082	25–15–4	54
45	January 10	Pittsburgh	4–3	Colorado	OT	Francouz	18,132	25–15–5	55
46	January 14	Dallas	3–2	Colorado	OT	Grubauer	18,015	25–15–6	56
47	January 16	San Jose	0–4	Colorado		Grubauer	18,014	26–15–6	58
48	January 18	St. Louis	3–5	Colorado		Grubauer	18,132	27–15–6	60
49	January 20	Detroit	3–6	Colorado		Francouz	18,110	28–15–6	62

February: 11–3–1 (Home: 3–2–1; Road: 8–1–0)
#	Date	Visitor	Score	Home	OT	Decision	Attendance	Record	Pts	Recap
50	February 1	Colorado	3–6	Philadelphia		Grubauer	19,745	28–16–6	62
51	February 4	Colorado	6–1	Buffalo		Grubauer	16,859	29–16–6	64
52	February 6	Colorado	4–1	Ottawa		Grubauer	11,465	30–16–6	66
53	February 8	Colorado	2–1	Columbus		Grubauer	19,022	31–16–6	68
54	February 9	Colorado	3–2	Minnesota		Francouz	17,444	32–16–6	70
55	February 11	Ottawa	0–3	Colorado		Grubauer	18,015	33–16–6	72
56	February 13	Washington	3–2	Colorado		Grubauer	18,146	33–17–6	72
57	February 15	Los Angeles	3–1	Colorado		Francouz	43,574 (outdoors)	33–18–6	72
58	February 17	Tampa Bay	4–3	Colorado	OT	Francouz	18,107	33–18–7	73
59	February 19	NY Islanders	1–3	Colorado		Francouz	18,011	34–18–7	75
60	February 21	Colorado	1–0	Anaheim		Francouz	16,742	35–18–7	77
61	February 22	Colorado	2–1	Los Angeles	SO	Francouz	18,230	36–18–7	79
62	February 26	Buffalo	2–3	Colorado		Francouz	18,020	37–18–7	81
63	February 28	Colorado	3–2	Carolina		Francouz	18,680	38–18–7	83
64	February 29	Colorado	3–2	Nashville		Francouz	17,619	39–18–7	85

March: 3–2–1 (Home: 1–0–1; Road: 2–2–0)
#	Date	Visitor	Score	Home	OT	Decision	Attendance	Record	Pts	Recap
65	March 2	Colorado	2–1	Detroit		Hutchinson	17,708	40–18–7	87
66	March 4	Anaheim	4–3	Colorado	OT	Francouz	18,033	40–18–8	88
67	March 6	Colorado	3–6	Vancouver		Francouz	18,871	40–19–8	88
68	March 8	Colorado	4–3	San Jose		Francouz	14,694	41–19–8	90
69	March 9	Colorado	1–3	Los Angeles		Francouz	15,011	41–20–8	90
70	March 11	NY Rangers	2–3	Colorado	OT	Francouz	18,025	42–20–8	92

Cancelled games
#	Date	Visitor	Home
71	March 13	Vancouver	Colorado
72	March 15	Vegas	Colorado
73	March 17	San Jose	Colorado
74	March 19	Colorado	Nashville
75	March 21	Montreal	Colorado
76	March 23	Colorado	Minnesota
77	March 25	Colorado	Edmonton
78	March 27	Colorado	Winnipeg
79	March 29	Nashville	Colorado
80	March 31	Arizona	Colorado
81	April 2	Winnipeg	Colorado
82	April 4	St. Louis	Colorado

Legend: Win (2 points) Loss (0 points) Overtime/shootout loss (1 point)

=== Playoffs ===
The Avalanche played in a round-robin tournament to determine their seed for the playoffs. Colorado finished with a 2–0–1 record to clinch the second seed for the playoffs.

The Avalanche faced the Arizona Coyotes in the first round and defeated them in five games.

The Avalanche faced the Dallas Stars in the second round, but lost in seven games.

2020 Stanley Cup playoffs

Western Conference Seeding Round-robin
#	Date	Visitor	Score	Home	OT	Decision	Record	Points	Recap
1	August 2	St. Louis	1–2	Colorado		Grubauer	1–0–0	2
2	August 5	Colorado	4–0	Dallas		Francouz	2–0–0	4
3	August 8	Vegas	4–3	Colorado	OT	Grubauer	2–0–1	5

Western Conference First Round vs. (7) Arizona Coyotes: Colorado won 4–1
#	Date	Visitor	Score	Home	OT	Decision	Series	Recap
1	August 12	Arizona	0–3	Colorado		Grubauer	1–0
2	August 14	Arizona	2–3	Colorado		Grubauer	2–0
3	August 15	Colorado	2–4	Arizona		Francouz	2–1
4	August 17	Colorado	7–1	Arizona		Grubauer	3–1
5	August 19	Arizona	1–7	Colorado		Grubauer	4–1

Western Conference Second Round vs. (3) Dallas Stars: Dallas won 4–3
#	Date	Visitor	Score	Home	OT	Decision	Series	Recap
1	August 22	Dallas	5–3	Colorado		Francouz	0–1
2	August 24	Dallas	5–2	Colorado		Francouz	0–2
3	August 26	Colorado	6–4	Dallas		Francouz	1–2
4	August 30	Colorado	4–5	Dallas		Francouz	1–3
5	August 31	Dallas	3–6	Colorado		Hutchinson	2–3
6	September 2	Colorado	4–1	Dallas		Hutchinson	3–3
7	September 4	Dallas	5–4	Colorado	OT	Hutchinson	3–4

Legend: Win (2 points) Loss (0 points) Overtime/shootout loss (1 point)

== Player statistics ==
Final stats

Skaters

Regular season
Player	GP	G	A	Pts	+/−	PIM
Nathan MacKinnon	69	35	58	93	+13	12
Cale Makar	57	12	38	50	+12	12
Andre Burakovsky	58	20	25	45	+11	22
Gabriel Landeskog	54	21	23	44	−2	47
Mikko Rantanen	42	19	22	41	−2	14
Nazem Kadri	51	19	17	36	+7	97
Samuel Girard	70	4	30	34	+1	17
Joonas Donskoi	65	16	17	33	+2	26
J. T. Compher	67	11	20	31	+9	18
Valeri Nichushkin	65	13	14	27	+26	14
Ryan Graves	69	9	17	26	+40	45
Ian Cole	65	4	22	26	+21	36
Matt Calvert	50	12	13	25	+13	39
Tyson Jost	67	8	15	23	+11	22
Pierre-Édouard Bellemare	69	9	13	22	+2	17
Matt Nieto	70	8	13	21	+7	6
Erik Johnson	59	3	13	16	+9	20
Nikita Zadorov	64	4	9	13	+6	65
Vladislav Kamenev	38	1	7	8	−2	8
Vladislav Namestnikov^{†}	9	4	2	6	+2	8
Colin Wilson	9	0	4	4	+6	0
Martin Kaut	8	2	1	3	−1	0
Logan O'Connor	16	2	0	2	0	2
Mark Barberio	21	0	2	2	+3	16
Calle Rosen^{‡}	8	0	2	2	+2	4
T. J. Tynan	16	0	1	1	−1	2
Anton Lindholm	4	0	1	1	+1	0
Jayson Megna	8	0	0	0	−1	2
Sheldon Dries	5	0	0	0	−2	0
Kevin Connauton	4	0	0	0	–2	0
Conor Timmins	2	0	0	0	+2	0

Playoffs
Player	GP	G	A	Pts	+/−	PIM
Nathan MacKinnon	15	9	16	25	+13	12
Mikko Rantanen	15	7	14	21	+11	6
Nazem Kadri	15	9	9	18	+3	10
Andre Burakovsky	15	7	10	17	+7	4
Cale Makar	15	4	11	15	+12	0
Gabriel Landeskog	14	2	11	13	+7	12
Samuel Girard	15	1	9	10	+4	6
J. T. Compher	15	3	5	8	+7	4
Joonas Donskoi	9	3	3	6	+1	2
Vladislav Namestnikov	12	4	1	5	+1	4
Nikita Zadorov	15	3	2	5	+5	18
Valeri Nichushkin	15	2	1	3	0	2
Pierre-Édouard Bellemare	15	2	1	3	0	6
Ryan Graves	15	1	2	3	+9	6
Matt Nieto	14	1	2	3	+1	4
Matt Calvert	8	1	2	3	+1	4
Ian Cole	15	0	2	2	+2	10
Erik Johnson	9	0	2	2	+3	0
Tyson Jost	12	1	0	1	−1	8
Logan O'Connor	5	0	1	1	0	0
Kevin Connauton	4	0	1	1	−2	6
Conor Timmins	2	0	0	0	+1	4
Sheldon Dries	1	0	0	0	0	0

Goaltenders

Regular season
Player	GP	GS	TOI	W	L	OT	GA	GAA	SA	SV%	SO	G	A	PIM
Michael Hutchinson^{†}	1	1	60:00	1	0	0	1	1.00	18	.944	0	0	0	0
Pavel Francouz	34	31	1,914:26	21	7	4	77	2.41	996	.923	1	0	0	2
Philipp Grubauer	36	36	2,057:06	18	12	4	90	2.63	1067	.916	2	0	0	0
Antoine Bibeau	2	1	91:45	1	0	0	5	3.27	42	.881	0	0	0	0
Adam Werner	2	1	87:50	1	1	0	5	3.42	58	.914	0	0	0	0

Playoffs
Player	GP	GS	TOI	W	L	OT	GA	GAA	SA	SV%	SO	G	A	PIM
Philipp Grubauer	7	7	385:20	5	0	1	12	1.87	153	.922	1	0	0	0
Michael Hutchinson	4	3	196:11	2	1	0	9	2.75	100	.910	0	0	0	0
Pavel Francouz	6	5	315:45	2	4	0	17	3.23	157	.892	1	0	0	0

^{†}Denotes player spent time with another team before joining the Avalanche. Stats reflect time with the Avalanche only.
^{‡}Denotes player was traded mid-season. Stats reflect time with the Avalanche only.
Bold/italics denotes franchise record.

== Transactions ==
The Avalanche have been involved in the following transactions during the 2019–20 season.

=== Trades ===
Date	Details		Ref
June 25, 2019	To Arizona Coyotes Carl Soderberg	To Colorado Avalanche Kevin Connauton; ARI's 3rd-round pick in 2020	
June 28, 2019	To Washington Capitals Scott Kosmachuk; 2nd-round pick in 2020; 3rd-round pick in 2020	To Colorado Avalanche Andre Burakovsky	
June 29, 2019	To Florida Panthers Dominic Toninato	To Colorado Avalanche Jacob MacDonald	
July 1, 2019	To Toronto Maple Leafs Tyson Barrie; Alexander Kerfoot; 6th-round pick in 2020	To Colorado Avalanche Nazem Kadri; Calle Rosen; TOR's 3rd-round pick in 2020	
September 27, 2019	To San Jose Sharks Nicolas Meloche	To Colorado Avalanche Antoine Bibeau	
February 24, 2020	To Ottawa Senators 4th-round pick in 2021	To Colorado Avalanche Vladislav Namestnikov	
February 24, 2020	To Toronto Maple Leafs Calle Rosen	To Colorado Avalanche Michael Hutchinson	

=== Free agents ===
Date	Player	Team	Contract term	Ref
July 1, 2019	Andrew Agozzino	to Pittsburgh Penguins	2-year	
July 1, 2019	Pierre-Edouard Bellemare	from Vegas Golden Knights	2-year	
July 1, 2019	Joonas Donskoi	from San Jose Sharks	4-year	
July 1, 2019	Spencer Martin	to Tampa Bay Lightning	1-year	
July 1, 2019	Patrik Nemeth	to Detroit Red Wings	2-year	
July 1, 2019	Semyon Varlamov	to New York Islanders	4-year	
July 1, 2019	David Warsofsky	to Pittsburgh Penguins	2-year	
July 2, 2019	Jayson Megna	from Washington Capitals	1-year	
July 2, 2019	Dan Renouf	from Carolina Hurricanes	2-year	
July 2, 2019	T. J. Tynan	from Vegas Golden Knights	1-year	
July 9, 2019	Sven Andrighetto	to Avangard Omsk (KHL)	1-year	
July 15, 2019	Sergei Boikov	to Dynamo Moscow (KHL)	2-year	
July 23, 2019	Julien Nantel	to Colorado Eagles (AHL)	1-year	
July 25, 2019	Max McCormick	to Carolina Hurricanes	1-year	
August 19, 2019	Valeri Nichushkin	from Dallas Stars	1-year	
August 21, 2019	Derick Brassard	to New York Islanders	1-year	
August 26, 2019	Gabriel Bourque	to Winnipeg Jets	1-year	
September 29, 2019	Mason Geertsen	to Hartford Wolf Pack (AHL)	1-year	

=== Waivers ===
Date	Player	Team	Ref
July 1, 2019		from/to	

=== Contract terminations ===
Date	Player	Via	Ref
July 1, 2019			

=== Retirement ===
Date	Player	Ref
July 1, 2019		

=== Signings ===
Date	Player	Contract term	Ref
July 1, 2019	Colin Wilson	1-year	
July 5, 2019	Nikita Zadorov	1-year	
July 8, 2019	Ryan Graves	1-year	
July 15, 2019	Andre Burakovsky	1-year	
July 17, 2019	J. T. Compher	4-year	
July 19, 2019	Bowen Byram	3-year	
July 23, 2019	Anton Lindholm	2-year	
July 25, 2019	Sheldon Dries	1-year	
July 30, 2019	Vladislav Kamenev	1-year	
July 31, 2019	Samuel Girard	7-year	
August 1, 2019	A. J. Greer	1-year	
September 28, 2019	Mikko Rantanen	6-year	
February 21, 2020	Pavel Francouz	2-year	
March 26, 2020	T. J. Tynan	1-year	

== Draft picks ==
Below are the Colorado Avalanches' selections at the 2019 NHL entry draft, which was held on June 21 and 22, 2019, at the Rogers Arena in Vancouver, British Columbia.

Round	#	Player	Pos	Nationality	College/Junior/Club team (League)
1	4	Bowen Byram	D	Canada	Vancouver Giants (WHL)
1	16	Alex Newhook	C	Canada	Victoria Grizzlies (BCHL)
2	47	Drew Helleson	D	United States	U.S. National Team Development Program
3	63	Matthew Stienburg	C	Canada	St. Andrew's College
3	78	Alex Beaucage	RW	Canada	Rouyn-Noranda Huskies (QMJHL)
5	140	Sasha Mutala	RW	Canada	Tri-City Americans (WHL)
6	171	Luka Burzan	RW	Canada	Brandon Wheat Kings (WHL)
7	202	Trent Miner	G	Canada	Vancouver Giants (WHL)
