= Ben Harpur =

Canadian ice hockey player

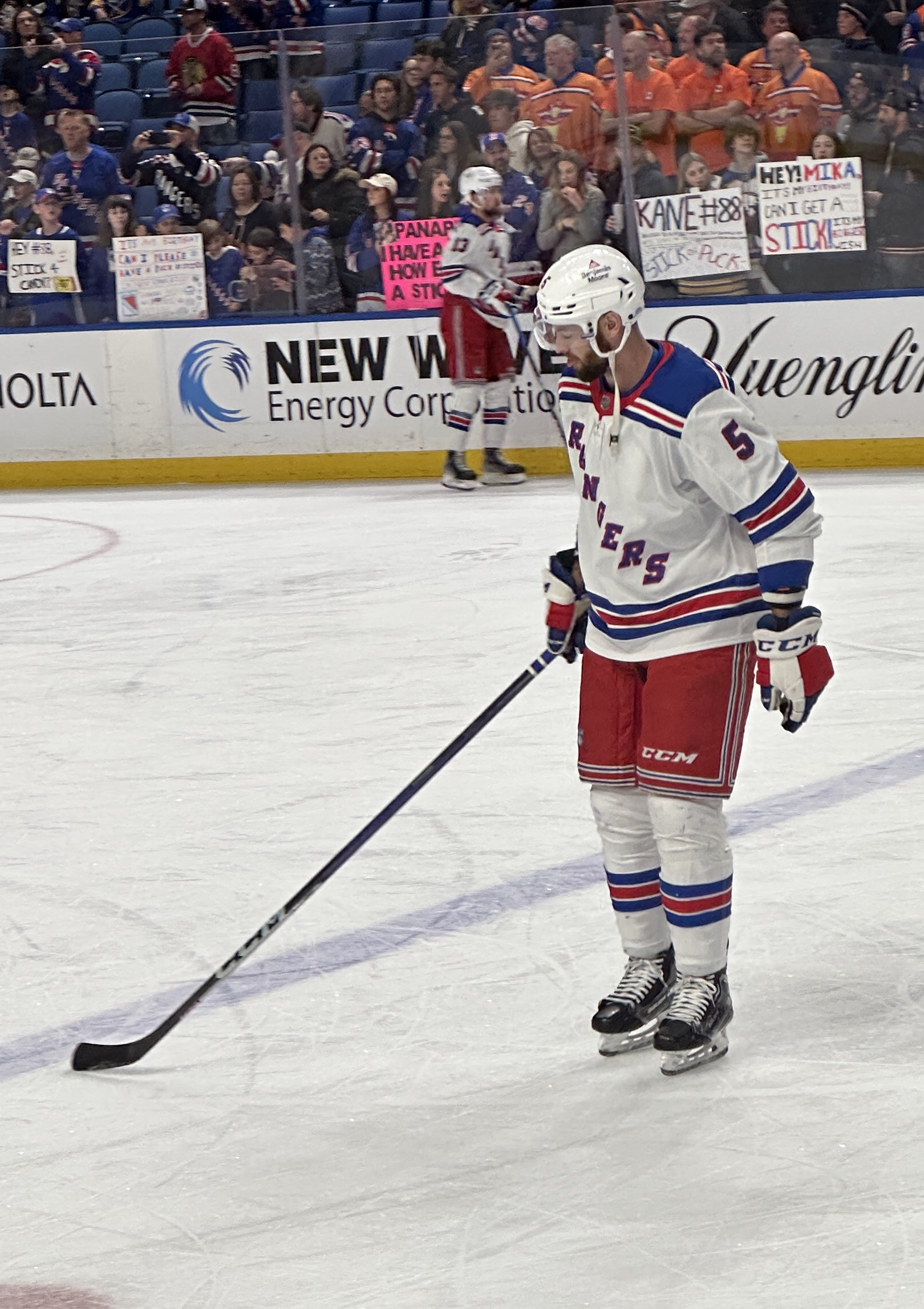
- Ben Harpur with the New York Rangers in 2023
- Born: January 12, 1995 (age 31) Hamilton, Ontario, Canada
- Height: 6 ft 6 in (198 cm)
- Weight: 218 lb (99 kg; 15 st 8 lb)
- Position: Defence
- Shoots: Left
- KHL team Former teams: Shanghai Dragons; Ottawa Senators; Toronto Maple Leafs; Nashville Predators; New York Rangers
- NHL draft: 108th overall, 2013; Ottawa Senators
- Playing career: 2015–present

Ben Harpur (born January 12, 1995) is a Canadian professional ice hockey defenceman who currently plays for the Shanghai Dragons of the Kontinental Hockey League (KHL). He was selected by the Ottawa Senators in the fourth round, 108th overall, in the 2013 NHL entry draft.

== Playing career ==
Harpur was born and raised in Niagara Falls and attended A. N. Myer Secondary School. He was originally a left-winger until a minor midget hockey team coach suggested he move to defence. He was drafted by the Guelph Storm as a defenceman in the 3rd round, 43rd overall, in the 2011 Ontario Hockey League (OHL) Priority Selection. Harpur recorded his first career OHL point, an assist, in a 10-2 win over the Erie Otters on October 1, 2011. Harpur played three and a half seasons with the Storm from 2011 to 2014.

After the 2012–13 season, Harpur was selected by the Ottawa Senators in the fourth round of the 2013 NHL entry draft. Harpur was traded in the middle of the 2014–15 season to the Barrie Colts. He signed a three-year entry-level contract with the Senators on November 6, 2014.

=== Professional ===
Harpur made his professional debut with the Senators' American Hockey League (AHL) affiliate Binghamton Senators in 2015.

During the 2015–16 season, Harpur was called up to Ottawa and made his NHL debut against the Minnesota Wild on March 31, 2016. In the 2016–17 season, Harpur again played most of the season with Binghamton. Harpur was called up to Ottawa for the NHL playoffs and he made his playoff debut on April 17, 2017, against the Boston Bruins. On February 9, 2018, Harpur signed a two-year, $1.45 million contract extension with the Senators.

On December 1, 2018, in the first game back for Erik Karlsson since his trade to the San Jose Sharks, Harpur scored his first ever National Hockey League goal on Sharks goaltender Martin Jones. On July 1, 2019, Harpur was traded by the Senators, along with Cody Ceci, Aaron Luchuk and a 2020 third-round draft pick to the Toronto Maple Leafs in exchange for Nikita Zaitsev, Connor Brown and Michael Carcone.

Unable to make the Maple Leafs roster heading into the 2019–20 season, Harpur was placed on waivers and re-assigned to AHL affiliate, the Toronto Marlies. Appearing in 33 games from the blueline for the Marlies, Harpur contributed with one goal and 11 points. With limited chance to return to the NHL with the Maple Leafs, Harpur was traded to the Nashville Predators in exchange for Miikka Salomäki on February 22, 2020.

After two full seasons within the Predators organization, Harpur left as a free agent and went unsigned leading into the 2022–23 season. On October 13, 2022, Harpur agreed to a professional tryout contract with the Hartford Wolf Pack of the AHL. Having played in four games with the Wolf Pack, Harpur was signed by NHL affiliate, the New York Rangers, in agreeing to a one-year, two-way contract on October 27. He was later recalled by the Rangers, and remained on the roster adding depth to the blueline in posting four points through 17 contests before he was signed to a two-year, $1.575 million contract extension with the Rangers on January 26, 2023.

Harpur's 2023-24 season ended after just seven games with the Hartford Wolf Pack after he required season-ending pectoral surgery.

On November 8, 2024, Harpur received a game misconduct for charging goalie Felix Sandström of the Rochester Americans. The following day, he received a four-game suspension from the AHL.

Ahead of the 2025-26 season, Harpur signed a professional tryout with the Florida Panthers of the NHL, but was released on October 2, 2025.

On October 19, 2025, Harpur inked a deal for the remainder of the season with the Shanghai Dragons of the Kontinental Hockey League (KHL).

== Personal life ==
Harpur was the middle child born to parents Margery and George. His father encouraged him to take skating lessons as a bonding experience. However, his mother was of Australian descent and had never played hockey. She would often put Harpur's equipment on backwards until he learned to dress himself.

== Career statistics ==
			Regular season					Playoffs
Season	Team	League	GP	G	A	Pts	PIM	GP	G	A	Pts	PIM
2011–12	Guelph Storm	OHL	34	1	3	4	22	—	—	—	—	—
2012–13	Guelph Storm	OHL	67	3	12	15	59	5	0	0	0	2
2013–14	Guelph Storm	OHL	67	3	13	16	69	20	1	4	5	12
2014–15	Guelph Storm	OHL	28	4	16	20	40	—	—	—	—	—
2014–15	Barrie Colts	OHL	29	1	10	11	22	9	2	4	6	6
2015–16	Binghamton Senators	AHL	47	2	4	6	34	—	—	—	—	—
2015–16	Evansville IceMen	ECHL	4	0	2	2	2	—	—	—	—	—
2015–16	Ottawa Senators	NHL	5	0	1	1	2	—	—	—	—	—
2016–17	Binghamton Senators	AHL	63	2	25	27	81	—	—	—	—	—
2016–17	Ottawa Senators	NHL	6	0	0	0	0	9	0	2	2	4
2017–18	Belleville Senators	AHL	19	2	9	11	31	—	—	—	—	—
2017–18	Ottawa Senators	NHL	41	0	1	1	21	—	—	—	—	—
2018–19	Ottawa Senators	NHL	51	1	4	5	56	—	—	—	—	—
2019–20	Toronto Marlies	AHL	34	1	10	11	22	—	—	—	—	—
2019–20	Milwaukee Admirals	AHL	7	0	1	1	20	—	—	—	—	—
2020–21	Nashville Predators	NHL	34	0	7	7	17	5	0	1	1	2
2021–22	Nashville Predators	NHL	19	0	1	1	27	—	—	—	—	—
2021–22	Milwaukee Admirals	AHL	6	0	0	0	5	—	—	—	—	—
2022–23	Hartford Wolf Pack	AHL	17	3	2	5	24	—	—	—	—	—
2022–23	New York Rangers	NHL	42	1	5	6	20	—	—	—	—	—
2023–24	Hartford Wolf Pack	AHL	7	1	2	3	2	—	—	—	—	—
2024–25	Hartford Wolf Pack	AHL	29	1	4	5	48	—	—	—	—	—
2025–26	Shanghai Dragons	KHL	22	1	2	3	24	—	—	—	—	—
NHL totals			198	2	19	21	143	14	0	3	3	6
