= 2020 Stanley Cup playoffs =

2020 NHL Postseason Tournament

Tournament details
- Venues: Rogers Place, Edmonton; Scotiabank Arena, Toronto
- Dates: August 1–September 28, 2020
- Teams: 24
- Defending champions: St. Louis Blues

Final positions
- Champions: Tampa Bay Lightning
- Runners-up: Dallas Stars

Tournament statistics
- Scoring leader(s): Nikita Kucherov (Lightning) (34 points)

Awards
- MVP: Victor Hedman (Lightning)

The 2020 Stanley Cup playoffs was the playoff tournament of the National Hockey League (NHL) for the 2019–20 season. The playoffs began on August 1, 2020, and concluded on September 28, 2020, with the Tampa Bay Lightning winning their second Stanley Cup in franchise history, defeating the Dallas Stars four games to two in the Stanley Cup Final. The playoffs were originally scheduled to begin in April, a few days after the regular season, and end in June. However, on March 12, the regular season was suspended due to the COVID-19 pandemic.

On May 26, commissioner Gary Bettman confirmed that the league was going to use a 24-team playoff format to finish the season, conducted in two or more host cities as "hubs" with players placed under strict health protocols, quarantined from the general public, and all games played behind closed doors with no fans admitted. On July 10, the league ratified an agreement for its protocols with the NHL Players Association (NHLPA). The Eastern Conference played its early-round games at Scotiabank Arena in Toronto, while the early rounds for the Western Conference, as well as the conference finals and Stanley Cup Final, were played at Rogers Place in Edmonton. This was the first Stanley Cup playoffs to be contested entirely in Canada since 1925, as well as the first time that the Stanley Cup was awarded on Canadian ice since 2011.

The Boston Bruins made the playoffs as the Presidents' Trophy winners with the most points (i.e. best record) during the regular season. The Pittsburgh Penguins increased their postseason appearance streak to fourteen seasons, the longest active streak. For the first time since 1996, all California-based teams, the Anaheim Ducks, Los Angeles Kings, and San Jose Sharks, missed the playoffs. Six Canadian-based teams made the postseason this year, the most since 1993. It also marked the first time since 1986 that all four teams in cities based in Western Canada made the playoffs. In addition, it marked the only time to date that both the Winnipeg Jets and Arizona Coyotes (previously the original Jets, before relocation) qualified for the playoffs in the same season, as well as the only time that the Coyotes made the playoffs since 2012. This was the last playoff appearance for the Coyotes before suspending operations in 2024. For the first time since 1999, all former World Hockey Association teams (Edmonton Oilers, Arizona Coyotes, Carolina Hurricanes, and Colorado Avalanche) made the playoffs.

Game two of the second round series between the Vancouver Canucks and Vegas Golden Knights was the 94th game of the 2020 Stanley Cup playoffs, surpassing the previous single-year record of 93 established in 2014. On September 17, the Tampa Bay Lightning became the first team in NHL history to win the clinching game of their first three series in overtime. The Dallas Stars set the record for the most games played in one playoff year (27) in game six of the Stanley Cup Final; the previous record (26) was shared by the 1987 Philadelphia Flyers, 2004 Calgary Flames, 2014 Los Angeles Kings, 2015 Tampa Bay Lightning and 2019 St. Louis Blues. Game six of the Stanley Cup Final was also the 130th game of the playoffs, setting the all-time record for most games played in one playoff year.

All games that were originally scheduled on August 27 and 28 were postponed due to a wildcat strike, in response to the shooting of Jacob Blake in Kenosha, Wisconsin.

== Playoff format ==
On May 26, the league announced that 24 teams (12 per conference) advanced to this special conference-based playoff tournament with teams being seeded based on their points percentage at the time the regular season was suspended on March 12. The top four teams in each conference played in a separate seeding round-robin, with regular season overtime and shootout rules, with the clubs accumulating points like the regular season, to determine the seeding in the first round. In addition, any ties in the round-robin standings were broken by the regular season points percentage. The eight lower seeded teams in each conference played in the qualifying round, a best-of-five series with playoff overtime rules. The winners of these series advanced to face one of the round-robin teams in the first round.

On May 28, the NHL stated that both the round-robin and the qualifying round were to be counted under playoff records, on the same day that the league declared the winners of the stats-based regular season NHL awards. The league then announced on June 4 that all series after the qualifying round would remain a best-of-seven series but were re-seeded after each round. With the ratification of an extension to the collective bargaining agreement on July 10, the league also announced that all teams participating in the qualifying round are considered to have made the playoffs and have participated in a playoff series.

== Host cities ==
The playoffs were held in two "hub" cities both in Canada; Edmonton, Alberta at Rogers Place, and Toronto, Ontario at Scotiabank Arena. They were announced as host cities on July 10 with the NHLPA's ratification of the Return to Play plan, and an extension to its collective bargaining agreement with the NHLPA through the 2025–26 season. From the start of the playoffs through to the end of the second round, each city hosted all of the games for one conference: the Eastern Conference teams played in Toronto, and the Western Conference teams played in Edmonton. All games in the conference finals and Stanley Cup Final were played in Edmonton.

Edmonton and Toronto were among a shortlist of ten host cities announced on May 26, along with Chicago, Columbus, Dallas, Las Vegas, Los Angeles, Pittsburgh, Saint Paul, and Vancouver. After the league cut the shortlist down to six cities on June 22, Las Vegas and Vancouver were considered to be the frontrunners to host games. Shortly after this, Vancouver dropped out of consideration on June 25, after health officials in British Columbia were unable to agree with the league on a protocol in the event that a player tested positive for COVID-19. Las Vegas and the other U.S. cities were passed over after Nevada and other U.S. states began to experience a spike in COVID-19 cases in late June; it was reported that the NHL originally intended to have one host city in Canada and one in the United States.

With the New York Rangers playing designated home games in the hub cities instead of in Madison Square Garden, the team's home arena was able to keep its tax exemptions by executing an act of God clause in its agreement with New York City. Under normal circumstances, like the 2014 NHL Stadium Series and 2018 NHL Winter Classic games played at other New York City venues, the Rangers would have always been designated as the visiting team to avoid breaking Madison Square Garden's tax-exempt status.

Each group of teams played inside what was called a "bubble". A secure perimeter was constructed around both venues with various amenities, with Edmonton's covering four hotels in the Ice District and Rogers Place's existing practice facilities, and Toronto's split between Exhibition Place (Hotel X, BMO Field, & Coca-Cola Coliseum) and the Fairmont Royal York hotel (which is connected to Scotiabank Arena). Both sites included fitness, dining and recreation areas. Restaurants were operating within the secure zones, and players were able to order outside food via concierge and local food delivery services. The games were held behind closed doors, but non-participating players were allowed to watch games. A large "stage" with multiple video screens was constructed to cover the empty stands for both teams in each end of the arena, and in-arena presentation was customized for each team when they were the designated home team (including use of their goal music, among other features). The league implemented a compressed playoff schedule with more back-to-back games than usual to help address "bubble fatigue" among the players, who had to live with monotonous daily routines away from their families for several weeks.

Although the general public was not permitted within the direct vicinity of the arena or inside, Oilers Entertainment Group announced plans to set up an outdoor "FanFest" at the site of a former casino near Rogers Place with approval of municipal and provincial health officials, including a "drive-in" screening games and a beer garden.

Edmonton	Toronto
Rogers Place	Scotiabank Arena

== Medical protocols ==
Under the Return to Play plan that was ratified on July 10, any player could opt out of the restart without providing a reason and without any penalty, provided that they had informed their team by July 13, when formal training camps opened. COVID-19 tests were then to be administered to players and staff every other day. On July 19, testing increased to three times 48 hours apart. The identities of those who tested positive were not released to the public, they would then be isolated and designated with the generic description "unfit for play" until they were medically cleared, and all injury updates were handled by the league instead of the teams.

Teams arrived at their hub city on July 26; they were isolated in a "secure zone" consisting of their hotels, restaurants, practice facilities, and the arena. Testing was done every day, as well as daily temperature and symptom checks. Individuals had to wear masks outside their hotel rooms except when eating, exercising, or while on the ice or bench. Other exceptions included during interviews with appropriate social distancing.

Under the Quarantine Act, all travellers entering Canada at the time were required to self-isolate for 14 days on arrival. The NHL received an exception to this policy for its players and staff, as long as they remained within the secure zone and were restricted from access to or by the general public. Anybody who left the bubble without prior approval could have faced a mandatory 14-day quarantine or been barred from returning. Teams could have also faced fines or loss of draft picks.

During the conclusions of each qualifying round series, teams exchanged fist bumps instead of the traditional handshakes. As players and coaches continued to test negative for COVID-19, the traditional handshake lines returned at the end of each first-round series. After entering the bubble, the league had no personnel test positive for the virus during the playoffs.

== Playoff teams ==
The following teams qualified for the playoffs:

=== Eastern Conference ===
Seeding round-robin

1. Boston Bruins, Atlantic Division champions, Eastern Conference regular season champions, Presidents' Trophy winners – .714
2. Tampa Bay Lightning – .657
3. Washington Capitals, Metropolitan Division champions – .652
4. Philadelphia Flyers – .645

Qualifying round

5. Pittsburgh Penguins – .623
6. Carolina Hurricanes – .596
7. New York Islanders – .588
8. Toronto Maple Leafs – .579 (28 RWs)
9. Columbus Blue Jackets – .579 (25 RWs)
10. Florida Panthers – .565
11. New York Rangers – .564
12. Montreal Canadiens – .500

=== Western Conference ===
Seeding round-robin

1. St. Louis Blues, Central Division champions, Western Conference regular season champions – .662
2. Colorado Avalanche – .657
3. Vegas Golden Knights, Pacific Division champions – .606
4. Dallas Stars – .594

Qualifying round

5. Edmonton Oilers – .585
6. Nashville Predators – .565 (28 RWs)
7. Vancouver Canucks – .565 (27 RWs)
8. Calgary Flames – .564
9. Winnipeg Jets – .563
10. Minnesota Wild – .558
11. Arizona Coyotes – .529
12. Chicago Blackhawks – .514

== Playoff bracket ==
In each round, the highest remaining seed in each conference was matched against the lowest remaining seed. The higher-seeded team was awarded home ice advantage. In the Stanley Cup Final, home ice was determined based on regular season points percentage. Each best-of-five series followed a 2–2–1 format: the higher-seeded team was the designated as the host for games one and two (and game five, if necessary), and the lower-seeded team was the host for games three (and game four, if necessary). Each best-of-seven series followed a 2–2–1–1–1 format: the higher-seeded team was the host for games one and two (and games five and seven, if necessary), and the lower-seeded team was the host for games three and four (and game six, if necessary). In the first round, the top four teams in each conference were seeded one through four based on their final standings from the round-robin. The teams that advanced from the qualifying round were re-seeded five through eight based on their regular season points percentage.

Qualifying round
5	Pittsburgh	1
12	Montreal	3
6	Carolina	3
11	NY Rangers	0
Eastern Conference
7	NY Islanders	3
10	Florida	1
8	Toronto	2
9	Columbus	3
5	Edmonton	1
12	Chicago	3
6	Nashville	1
11	Arizona	3
Western Conference
7	Vancouver	3
10	Minnesota	1
8	Calgary	3
9	Winnipeg	1

First round
1	Philadelphia	4
8	Montreal	2
2	Tampa Bay	4
7	Columbus	1
3	Washington	1
6	NY Islanders	4
4	Boston	4
5	Carolina	1
1	Vegas	4
8	Chicago	1
2	Colorado	4
7	Arizona	1
3	Dallas	4
6	Calgary	2
4	St. Louis	2
5	Vancouver	4

Second round
1	Philadelphia	3
6	NY Islanders	4
2	Tampa Bay	4
4	Boston	1
1	Vegas	4
5	Vancouver	3
2	Colorado	3
3	Dallas	4

Conference finals
6	NY Islanders	2
2	Tampa Bay	4
1	Vegas	1
3	Dallas	4

Stanley Cup Final
E2	Tampa Bay	4
W3	Dallas	2

== Exhibition games ==
Prior to the start of the playoffs, all 24 qualified teams played one exhibition game.

=== July 28 ===
Pittsburgh Penguins	2–3	OT	Philadelphia Flyers	Scotiabank Arena	Recap

Toronto Maple Leafs	4–2	Montreal Canadiens	Scotiabank Arena	Recap

Edmonton Oilers	4–1	Calgary Flames	Rogers Place	Recap

=== July 29 ===
Tampa Bay Lightning	5–0	Florida Panthers	Scotiabank Arena	Recap

Colorado Avalanche	3–2	Minnesota Wild	Rogers Place	Recap

Carolina Hurricanes	2–3	Washington Capitals	Scotiabank Arena	Recap

St. Louis Blues	0–4	Chicago Blackhawks	Rogers Place	Recap

New York Islanders	2–1	New York Rangers	Scotiabank Arena	Recap

Vancouver Canucks	1–4	Winnipeg Jets	Rogers Place	Recap

=== July 30 ===
Nashville Predators	2–0	Dallas Stars	Rogers Place	Recap

Boston Bruins	1–4	Columbus Blue Jackets	Scotiabank Arena	Recap

Vegas Golden Knights	4–1	Arizona Coyotes	Rogers Place	Recap

== Stanley Cup qualifiers ==
The top four playoff teams in each conference played in a round-robin tournament against each other to determine the final playoff seeding. The round-robin games were played with regular season overtime and shootout rules, with the teams accumulating points like the regular season, and any ties in the round-robin standings were broken by the regular season points percentage instead of regulation wins.

The bottom eight playoff teams in each conference played in a best-of-five series to determine which four teams advanced to the first round. The qualifying round games were played with Stanley Cup playoff overtime rules. Seeding was determined by regular season points percentage.

=== Eastern Conference seeding round-robin ===
Pos	Team	GP	W	L	OTL	PCT	GF	GA	GD	Pts
1	Philadelphia Flyers	3	3	0	0	0.645	11	3	+8	6
2	Tampa Bay Lightning	3	2	1	0	0.657	7	8	−1	4
3	Washington Capitals	3	1	1	1	0.652	5	7	−2	3
4	Boston Bruins	3	0	3	0	0.714	4	9	−5	0

Source: National Hockey League

During the first game of round-robin play, the Flyers' Carter Hart made 34 saves against the Bruins in a 4–1 victory. In the game between Washington and Tampa Bay, with the game forced to go to a shootout (the first in Stanley Cup playoff history), Nikita Kucherov's shot got past Braden Holtby for the winning goal in a 3–2 triumph. The Lightning then faced the Bruins, and Tyler Johnson's goal at 18:33 of the third period won the game for Tampa Bay 3–2. In the Flyers' match-up against the Capitals, Scott Laughton's two goals assisted Philadelphia's 3–1 victory. Between the top two seeds, the Flyers defeated the Lightning 4–1 to take the first seed riding on Nicolas Aube-Kubel's two goals in the first period. Battling out for the third spot, Holtby made 30 saves for Washington in their victory, defeating the Presidents' Trophy-winning Boston Bruins 2–1.

August 2	Philadelphia Flyers	4–1	Boston Bruins	Scotiabank Arena	Recap
No scoring		First period	No scoring
Michael Raffl (1) – 05:33; Nate Thompson (1) – 09:31; Philippe Myers (1) – 18:59		Second period	18:51 – Chris Wagner (1)
Scott Laughton (1) – 04:07		Third period	No scoring
Carter Hart 34 saves / 35 shots		Goalie stats	Jaroslav Halak 25 saves / 29 shots

August 3	Washington Capitals	2–3	SO	Tampa Bay Lightning	Scotiabank Arena	Recap
No scoring		First period		12:53 – Nikita Kucherov (1)
Richard Panik (1) – 17:24; Evgeny Kuznetsov (1) – pp – 19:32		Second period		07:48 – Mitchell Stephens (1)
No scoring		Third period		No scoring
T. J. Oshie; Evgeny Kuznetsov; Nicklas Backstrom		Shootout		Victor Hedman; Brayden Point; Nikita Kucherov
Braden Holtby 26 saves / 28 shots		Goalie stats		Andrei Vasilevskiy 31 saves / 33 shots

August 5	Tampa Bay Lightning	3–2	Boston Bruins	Scotiabank Arena	Recap
Brayden Point (1) – 07:33; Alex Killorn (1) – pp – 10:32		First period	No scoring
No scoring		Second period	16:43 – Charlie McAvoy (1)
Tyler Johnson (1) – 18:33		Third period	01:47 – Chris Wagner (2)
Andrei Vasilevskiy 25 saves / 27 shots		Goalie stats	Tuukka Rask 32 saves / 35 shots

August 6	Washington Capitals	1–3	Philadelphia Flyers	Scotiabank Arena	Recap
No scoring		First period	13:03 – Scott Laughton (2)
No scoring		Second period	11:30 – Travis Sanheim (1)
Travis Boyd (1) – 08:49		Third period	08:37 – Scott Laughton (3)
Braden Holtby 18 saves / 21 shots		Goalie stats	Brian Elliott 16 saves / 17 shots

August 8	Philadelphia Flyers	4–1	Tampa Bay Lightning	Scotiabank Arena	Recap
Nicolas Aube-Kubel (1) – 07:40; Nicolas Aube-Kubel (2) – 14:00		First period	No scoring
Joel Farabee (1) – 14:22		Second period	05:21 – pp – Tyler Johnson (2)
Tyler Pitlick (1) – en – 18:40		Third period	No scoring
Carter Hart 23 saves / 24 shots		Goalie stats	Andrei Vasilevskiy 26 saves / 29 shots

August 9	Boston Bruins	1–2	Washington Capitals	Scotiabank Arena	Recap
No scoring		First period	19:44 – T. J. Oshie (1)
No scoring		Second period	No scoring
Jake DeBrusk (1) – 10:30		Third period	02:49 – Tom Wilson (1)
Tuukka Rask 23 saves / 25 shots		Goalie stats	Braden Holtby 30 saves / 31 shots

=== Western Conference seeding round-robin ===
Pos	Team	GP	W	L	OTL	PCT	GF	GA	GD	Pts
1	Vegas Golden Knights	3	3	0	0	0.606	15	10	+5	6
2	Colorado Avalanche	3	2	0	1	0.657	9	5	+4	5
3	Dallas Stars	3	1	2	0	0.594	5	10	−5	2
4	St. Louis Blues	3	0	2	1	0.662	6	10	−4	1

Source: National Hockey League

During the first game between Colorado and St. Louis, Nazem Kadri scored with 0.1 remaining on the clock for the Avalanche emerging victorious 2–1. Vegas staged a two-goal comeback in their game against Dallas, coming back from 3–1 down to win 5–3. Avalanche goaltender Pavel Francouz shut out the Stars 4–0 taking a 2–0 record in the round-robin. Vegas forward Alex Tuch and defenceman Shea Theodore both scored twice in their game against St. Louis, emerging victorious 6–4. Battling out for the first seed, the Avalanche and Golden Knights held a back-and-forth affair until Alex Tuch scored in overtime to give Vegas a 4–3 victory, emerging as the top seed in the Western Conference. The round-robin finale between the Stars and Blues was to determine the third seed. Joe Pavelski tied the game at one for the Stars with only 32 seconds remaining in regulation, then Denis Gurianov scored the only goal of the shootout to give Dallas the third seed with the 2–1 victory.

August 2	St. Louis Blues	1–2	Colorado Avalanche	Rogers Place	Recap
David Perron (1) – pp – 16:46		First period	No scoring
No scoring		Second period	No scoring
No scoring		Third period	05:33 – Ryan Graves (1); 19:59 – pp – Nazem Kadri (1)
Jordan Binnington 36 saves / 38 shots		Goalie stats	Philipp Grubauer 31 saves / 32 shots

August 3	Dallas Stars	3–5	Vegas Golden Knights	Rogers Place	Recap
No scoring		First period	01:04 – Chandler Stephenson (1)
Joe Pavelski (1) – 07:50; Jamie Oleksiak (1) – 08:32; Corey Perry (1) – pp – 12:42		Second period	No scoring
No scoring		Third period	09:46 – Mark Stone (1); 11:15 – Nate Schmidt (1); 14:47 – William Carrier (1); 19:39 – en – William Karlsson (1)
Ben Bishop 28 saves / 32 shots		Goalie stats	Robin Lehner 24 saves / 27 shots

August 5	Colorado Avalanche	4–0	Dallas Stars	Rogers Place	Recap
Cale Makar (1) – pp – 03:19; Joonas Donskoi (1) – 15:29		First period	No scoring
Vladislav Namestnikov (1) – 17:30		Second period	No scoring
Andre Burakovsky (1) – pp – 01:31		Third period	No scoring
Pavel Francouz 27 saves / 27 shots		Goalie stats	Anton Khudobin 36 saves / 40 shots

August 6	Vegas Golden Knights	6–4	St. Louis Blues	Rogers Place	Recap
No scoring		First period	04:02 – David Perron (2)
Shea Theodore (1) – pp – 06:50; Alex Tuch (1) – 10:47; Alex Tuch (2) – pp – 13:13		Second period	01:45 – Colton Parayko (1); 14:07 – Colton Parayko (2); 14:28 – Troy Brouwer (1)
Zach Whitecloud (1) – 02:01; Mark Stone (2) – 12:31; Shea Theodore (2) – 14:49		Third period	No scoring
Marc-Andre Fleury 13 saves / 17 shots		Goalie stats	Jordan Binnington 32 saves / 38 shots

August 8	Vegas Golden Knights	4–3	OT	Colorado Avalanche	Rogers Place	Recap
No scoring		First period		No scoring
Jonathan Marchessault (1) – pp – 01:34; Nicolas Roy (1) – 12:55		Second period		06:46 – pp – Nathan MacKinnon (1); 14:51 – Joonas Donskoi (2)
Jonathan Marchessault (2) – ps – 03:02		Third period		18:58 – J. T. Compher (1)
Alex Tuch (3) – 04:44		First overtime period		No scoring
Robin Lehner 32 saves / 35 shots		Goalie stats		Philipp Grubauer 22 saves / 26 shots

August 9	Dallas Stars	2–1	SO	St. Louis Blues	Rogers Place	Recap
No scoring		First period		03:43 – Robert Thomas (1)
No scoring		Second period		No scoring
Joe Pavelski (2) – 19:28		Third period		No scoring
Joe Pavelski; Denis Gurianov		Shootout		David Perron; Vladimir Tarasenko; Ryan O'Reilly
Anton Khudobin 21 saves / 22 shots		Goalie stats		Jake Allen 37 saves / 38 shots

=== Eastern Conference qualifying round ===
==== (5) Pittsburgh Penguins vs. (12) Montreal Canadiens ====
Pittsburgh finished fifth in the Eastern Conference with 86 points in 69 games for a points percentage of .623. Montreal gained 71 points in 71 games for a points percentage of .500 to finish twelfth in the Eastern Conference. This was the third playoff meeting between these two teams, with Montreal winning both previous series. They last met in the 2010 Eastern Conference semifinals, which Montreal won in seven games. Pittsburgh won two of the three games in this year's regular season series.

The Canadiens upset the Penguins in four games. With game one remaining tied 2–2 after the third period, Jeff Petry scored in overtime to give the Canadiens the victory. Among the 38 shots the Penguins forced on Carey Price in game two, Pittsburgh forward Jason Zucker's goal in the third period was the game-winner in their 3–1 triumph. In game three, Jeff Petry's goal in the third period capped a two-goal comeback for Montreal winning the affair 4–3 and taking the series lead. In game four, Carey Price shut the Penguins out 2–0 advancing the team to the first round of the playoffs.

August 1	Montreal Canadiens	3–2	OT	Pittsburgh Penguins	Scotiabank Arena	Recap
Jesperi Kotkaniemi (1) – 11:27		First period		No scoring
Nick Suzuki (1) – 06:53		Second period		09:55 – Sidney Crosby (1); 12:34 – pp – Bryan Rust (1)
No scoring		Third period		No scoring
Jeff Petry (1) – 13:57		First overtime period		No scoring
Carey Price 39 saves / 41 shots		Goalie stats		Matt Murray 32 saves / 35 shots

August 3	Montreal Canadiens	1–3	Pittsburgh Penguins	Scotiabank Arena	Recap
No scoring		First period	04:25 – Sidney Crosby (2)
No scoring		Second period	No scoring
Jesperi Kotkaniemi (2) – 17:50		Third period	14:41 – Jason Zucker (1); 19:50 – en – Jake Guentzel (1)
Carey Price 35 saves / 37 shots		Goalie stats	Matt Murray 26 saves / 27 shots

August 5	Pittsburgh Penguins	3–4	Montreal Canadiens	Scotiabank Arena	Recap
Patric Hornqvist (1) – pp – 08:40; Jason Zucker (2) – pp – 09:39		First period	04:57 – Shea Weber (1)
Teddy Blueger (1) – 05:34		Second period	10:13 – Jonathan Drouin (1); 15:50 – Paul Byron (1)
No scoring		Third period	05:33 – Jeff Petry (2)
Matt Murray 27 saves / 31 shots		Goalie stats	Carey Price 30 saves / 33 shots

August 7	Pittsburgh Penguins	0–2	Montreal Canadiens	Scotiabank Arena	Recap
No scoring		First period	No scoring
No scoring		Second period	No scoring
No scoring		Third period	15:49 – Artturi Lehkonen (1); 19:28 – en – Shea Weber (2)
Tristan Jarry 20 saves / 21 shots		Goalie stats	Carey Price 22 saves / 22 shots

Montreal won series 3–1

==== (6) Carolina Hurricanes vs. (11) New York Rangers ====
Carolina finished sixth in the Eastern Conference with 81 points in 68 games for a points percentage of .596. New York gained 79 points in 70 games for a points percentage of .564 to finish eleventh in the Eastern Conference. This was the first playoff meeting between these two teams. New York won all four games in this year's regular season series.

The Hurricanes defeated the Rangers in a three-game sweep. In game one, Sebastian Aho and Jaccob Slavin both recorded a goal and an assist in the Hurricanes 3–2 victory. Andrei Svechnikov scored the Hurricanes' first playoff hat trick during game two in a 4–1 victory, giving Carolina the chance to clinch in game three. Aho provided two goals and an assist in game three giving Carolina a 4–1 victory and advancing the team to the first round of the playoffs.

August 1	New York Rangers	2–3	Carolina Hurricanes	Scotiabank Arena	Recap
No scoring		First period	01:01 – Jaccob Slavin (1)
Mika Zibanejad (1) – 14:26		Second period	06:29 – pp – Sebastian Aho (1)
Marc Staal (1) – sh – 18:05		Third period	10:51 – Martin Necas (1)
Henrik Lundqvist 34 saves / 37 shots		Goalie stats	Petr Mrazek 24 saves / 26 shots

August 3	New York Rangers	1–4	Carolina Hurricanes	Scotiabank Arena	Recap
Artemi Panarin (1) – pp – 12:05		First period	04:32 – Andrei Svechnikov (1)
No scoring		Second period	01:11 – pp – Andrei Svechnikov (2); 02:22 – Jordan Martinook (1)
No scoring		Third period	14:02 – Andrei Svechnikov (3)
Henrik Lundqvist 30 saves / 34 shots		Goalie stats	Petr Mrazek 23 saves / 24 shots

August 4	Carolina Hurricanes	4–1	New York Rangers	Scotiabank Arena	Recap
No scoring		First period	No scoring
Teuvo Teravainen (1) – 03:18		Second period	00:12 – Chris Kreider (1)
Warren Foegele (1) – 05:07; Sebastian Aho (2) – 10:26; Sebastian Aho (3) – sh-en – 19:29		Third period	No scoring
James Reimer 37 saves / 38 shots		Goalie stats	Igor Shesterkin 27 saves / 30 shots

Carolina won series 3–0

==== (7) New York Islanders vs. (10) Florida Panthers ====
New York finished seventh in the Eastern Conference with 80 points in 68 games for a points percentage of .588. Florida gained 78 points in 69 games for a points percentage of .565 to finish tenth in the Eastern Conference. This was the second playoff meeting between these two teams. Their only previous meeting was in the 2016 Eastern Conference first round, which New York won in six games. New York won all three games in this year's regular season series.

The Islanders defeated the Panthers in four games. In game one, a 27-save performance by New York goaltender Semyon Varlamov gave the Islanders a 2–1 victory. Game two had Jordan Eberle score two goals for the Islanders, leading the team to a 4–2 victory. The Panthers, in danger of elimination in game three, scored two power-play goals en route to a 3–2 victory to force a fourth game. In the fourth game, Anthony Beauvillier scored twice for New York to send the Islanders to the first round of the playoffs in a 5–1 victory.

August 1	Florida Panthers	1–2	New York Islanders	Scotiabank Arena	Recap
No scoring		First period	12:00 – Jean-Gabriel Pageau (1)
No scoring		Second period	03:39 – pp – Anthony Beauvillier (1)
Jonathan Huberdeau (1) – 00:23		Third period	No scoring
Sergei Bobrovsky 26 saves / 28 shots		Goalie stats	Semyon Varlamov 27 saves / 28 shots

August 4	Florida Panthers	2–4	New York Islanders	Scotiabank Arena	Recap
Mike Hoffman (1) – 11:16		First period	No scoring
Aleksander Barkov (1) – pp – 07:54		Second period	06:12 – Matt Martin (1); 13:48 – pp – Ryan Pulock (1); 16:27 – Jordan Eberle (1)
No scoring		Third period	10:29 – pp – Jordan Eberle (2)
Sergei Bobrovsky 30 saves / 34 shots		Goalie stats	Semyon Varlamov 26 saves / 28 shots

August 5	New York Islanders	2–3	Florida Panthers	Scotiabank Arena	Recap
No scoring		First period	No scoring
Jean-Gabriel Pageau (2) – 16:26		Second period	04:02 – pp – Erik Haula (1)
Brock Nelson (1) – 18:33		Third period	00:41 – pp – Mike Hoffman (2); 02:48 – Brian Boyle (1)
Semyon Varlamov 19 saves / 22 shots		Goalie stats	Sergei Bobrovsky 20 saves / 22 shots

August 7	New York Islanders	5–1	Florida Panthers	Scotiabank Arena	Recap
Anthony Beauvillier (2) – 11:32; Anthony Beauvillier (3) – 15:10		First period	18:41 – pp – Mike Hoffman (3)
Brock Nelson (2) – pp – 08:01		Second period	No scoring
Mathew Barzal (1) – 10:34; Jean-Gabriel Pageau (3) – en – 17:17		Third period	No scoring
Semyon Varlamov 24 saves / 25 shots		Goalie stats	Sergei Bobrovsky 33 saves / 37 shots

New York won series 3–1

==== (8) Toronto Maple Leafs vs. (9) Columbus Blue Jackets ====
Toronto finished eighth in the Eastern Conference with 81 points in 70 games for a points percentage of .579 and 28 RWs. Columbus had the same points percentage, but with 25 RWs they finished ninth. This was the first playoff meeting between these two teams. These teams split their two-game regular season series.

The Blue Jackets defeated the Maple Leafs in five games. Joonas Korpisalo shut out the Maple Leafs in game one, stopping all 28 shots in a 2–0 victory. Maple Leafs goaltender Frederik Andersen responded with his own shutout in game two, stopping 20 shots in the process of a 3–0 victory. Pierre-Luc Dubois's hat-trick, three-goal comeback-fulfilling, overtime goal spurred Columbus' game three victory, winning by the score of 4–3. The Maple Leafs then responded with their own three-goal comeback, all while sporting an extra attacker with the goaltender pulled. Auston Matthews then scored the overtime game-winner, and the Leafs were victorious by the score of 4–3. In game five, Korpisalo shut the door on the Leafs, stopping all 33 shots in a 3–0 victory to advance to the first round of the playoffs.

August 2	Columbus Blue Jackets	2–0	Toronto Maple Leafs	Scotiabank Arena	Recap
No scoring		First period	No scoring
No scoring		Second period	No scoring
Cam Atkinson (1) – 01:05; Alexander Wennberg (1) – en – 19:41		Third period	No scoring
Joonas Korpisalo 28 saves / 28 shots		Goalie stats	Frederik Andersen 33 saves / 34 shots

August 4	Columbus Blue Jackets	0–3	Toronto Maple Leafs	Scotiabank Arena	Recap
No scoring		First period	No scoring
No scoring		Second period	16:00 – Auston Matthews (1)
No scoring		Third period	04:56 – John Tavares (1); 19:17 – en – Morgan Rielly (1)
Joonas Korpisalo 36 saves / 38 shots		Goalie stats	Frederik Andersen 20 saves / 20 shots

August 6	Toronto Maple Leafs	3–4	OT	Columbus Blue Jackets	Scotiabank Arena	Recap
Cody Ceci (1) – sh – 18:52		First period		No scoring
William Nylander (1) – pp – 07:08; Nicholas Robertson (1) – 08:48		Second period		11:39 – Pierre-Luc Dubois (1)
No scoring		Third period		07:27 – Seth Jones (1); 10:49 – Pierre-Luc Dubois (2)
No scoring		First overtime period		18:24 – Pierre-Luc Dubois (3)
Frederik Andersen 39 saves / 43 shots		Goalie stats		Joonas Korpisalo 12 saves / 15 shots Elvis Merzlikins 21 saves / 21 shots

August 7	Toronto Maple Leafs	4–3	OT	Columbus Blue Jackets	Scotiabank Arena	Recap
No scoring		First period		03:58 – Cam Atkinson (2)
No scoring		Second period		04:40 – Vladislav Gavrikov (1)
William Nylander (2) – 16:03; John Tavares (2) – 16:54; Zach Hyman (1) – 19:37		Third period		14:18 – Boone Jenner (1)
Auston Matthews (2) – pp – 13:10		First overtime period		No scoring
Frederik Andersen 36 saves / 39 shots		Goalie stats		Elvis Merzlikins 49 saves / 53 shots

August 9	Columbus Blue Jackets	3–0	Toronto Maple Leafs	Scotiabank Arena	Recap
Zach Werenski (1) – 06:29		First period	No scoring
No scoring		Second period	No scoring
Liam Foudy (1) – 11:40; Nick Foligno (1) – en – 19:37		Third period	No scoring
Joonas Korpisalo 33 saves / 33 shots		Goalie stats	Frederik Andersen 19 saves / 21 shots

Columbus won series 3–2

=== Western Conference qualifying round ===
==== (5) Edmonton Oilers vs. (12) Chicago Blackhawks ====
Edmonton finished fifth in the Western Conference with 83 points in 71 games for a points percentage of .585. Chicago gained 72 points in 70 games for a points percentage of .514 to finish twelfth in the Western Conference. This was the fifth playoff meeting between these two teams, with Edmonton winning three of the four previous series. They last met in the 1992 Campbell Conference finals, which Chicago won in a four-game sweep. Chicago won two of the three games in this year's regular season series.

The Blackhawks upset the Oilers in four games. Blackhawks rookie forward Dominik Kubalik scored two goals and assisted three times in game one, resulting in Chicago's 6–4 victory. In game two, Oilers captain Connor McDavid recorded a hat-trick assisted thrice by Ryan Nugent-Hopkins tying the series 1–1 in a 6–3 triumph. In game three, Blackhawks captain Jonathan Toews scored twice, including the game-winner with 1:16 remaining in the game, capping off a 4–3 victory. In game four, Kubalik's goal at 8:30 of the third period proved to be the series-winner, defeating the Oilers 3–2.

August 1	Chicago Blackhawks	6–4	Edmonton Oilers	Rogers Place	Recap
Dylan Strome (1) – 05:51; Jonathan Toews (1) – pp – 07:56; Brandon Saad (1) – 09:17; Jonathan Toews (2) – 12:57		First period	02:34 – pp – Connor McDavid (1)
Dominik Kubalik (1) – pp – 06:32; Dominik Kubalik (2) – pp – 17:35		Second period	04:13 – pp – Leon Draisaitl (1)
No scoring		Third period	16:07 – pp – James Neal (1); 16:43 – Ryan Nugent-Hopkins (1)
Corey Crawford 25 saves / 29 shots		Goalie stats	Mike Smith 18 saves / 23 shots Mikko Koskinen 18 saves / 19 shots

August 3	Chicago Blackhawks	3–6	Edmonton Oilers	Rogers Place	Recap
Patrick Kane (1) – 09:06		First period	00:19 – Connor McDavid (2); 04:05 – Connor McDavid (3)
Slater Koekkoek (1) – 04:22; Olli Maatta (1) – 15:13		Second period	01:44 – Tyler Ennis (1); 17:10 – pp – Connor McDavid (4)
No scoring		Third period	07:25 – James Neal (2); 08:05 – Alex Chiasson (1)
Corey Crawford 29 saves / 35 shots		Goalie stats	Mikko Koskinen 23 saves / 26 shots

August 5	Edmonton Oilers	3–4	Chicago Blackhawks	Rogers Place	Recap
Leon Draisaitl (2) – 09:42		First period	09:14 – Olli Maatta (2); 19:55 – pp – Jonathan Toews (3)
Leon Draisaitl (3) – 04:07; Connor McDavid (5) – pp – 19:52		Second period	No scoring
No scoring		Third period	14:13 – Matthew Highmore (1); 18:44 – Jonathan Toews (4)
Mikko Koskinen 21 saves / 25 shots		Goalie stats	Corey Crawford 25 saves / 28 shots

August 7	Edmonton Oilers	2–3	Chicago Blackhawks	Rogers Place	Recap
Josh Archibald (1) – 00:45		First period	05:16 – Brandon Saad (2); 07:56 – Matthew Highmore (2)
Ryan Nugent-Hopkins (2) – 02:02		Second period	No scoring
No scoring		Third period	08:30 – Dominik Kubalik (3)
Mikko Koskinen 26 saves / 29 shots		Goalie stats	Corey Crawford 43 saves / 45 shots

Chicago won series 3–1

==== (6) Nashville Predators vs. (11) Arizona Coyotes ====
Nashville finished sixth in the Western Conference with 78 points in 69 games for a points percentage of .565, winning the tiebreaker against Vancouver with 28 RWs. Arizona gained 74 points in 70 games for a points percentage of .529 to finish eleventh in the Western Conference. This was the second playoff meeting between these two teams. Their only previous meeting was in the 2012 Western Conference semifinals, which Arizona won in five games. These teams split their two-game regular season series.

The Coyotes defeated the Predators in four games. In game one, the Coyotes jumped out to a 4–1 lead, scoring a power play and a shorthanded goal, and held off a Predators third period rally for the victory. Although the Coyotes had two goals in the final minute of game two, the Predators successfully kept the lead winning 4–2. In game three, Darcy Kuemper stopped 39 of 40 shots and his teammates exploded for three goals in the third period, leading to a 4–1 victory. The Coyotes clinched in game four after much drama; they blew a 2–0 second period lead and allowed Filip Forsberg's tying goal with only 32 seconds left in regulation, but Brad Richardson scored the series-winner 5:27 into overtime.

August 2	Arizona Coyotes	4–3	Nashville Predators	Rogers Place	Recap
Oliver Ekman-Larsson (1) – 07:59; Christian Dvorak (1) – 10:52; Clayton Keller (1) – pp – 15:42		First period	19:57 – pp – Filip Forsberg (1)
Michael Grabner (1) – sh – 16:25		Second period	No scoring
No scoring		Third period	00:30 – Ryan Ellis (1); 08:56 – pp – Filip Forsberg (2)
Darcy Kuemper 40 saves / 43 shots		Goalie stats	Juuse Saros 33 saves / 37 shots

August 4	Arizona Coyotes	2–4	Nashville Predators	Rogers Place	Recap
No scoring		First period	07:50 – Nick Bonino (1); 10:27 – Ryan Johansen (1)
No scoring		Second period	06:02 – Calle Jarnkrok (1)
Clayton Keller (2) – 19:03; Lawson Crouse (1) – 19:12		Third period	13:49 – pp – Viktor Arvidsson (1)
Darcy Kuemper 24 saves / 28 shots		Goalie stats	Juuse Saros 24 saves / 26 shots

August 5	Nashville Predators	1–4	Arizona Coyotes	Rogers Place	Recap
No scoring		First period	05:09 – Christian Dvorak (2)
Viktor Arvidsson (2) – 07:31		Second period	No scoring
No scoring		Third period	07:08 – Conor Garland (1); 15:38 – pp – Taylor Hall (1); 18:06 – en – Carl Soderberg (1)
Juuse Saros 24 saves / 27 shots		Goalie stats	Darcy Kuemper 39 saves / 40 shots

August 7	Nashville Predators	3–4	OT	Arizona Coyotes	Rogers Place	Recap
No scoring		First period		17:27 – Michael Grabner (2)
Matt Duchene (1) – pp – 04:29; Viktor Arvidsson (3) – 08:26		Second period		01:37 – Phil Kessel (1)
Filip Forsberg (3) – 19:28		Third period		04:21 – Jordan Oesterle (1)
No scoring		First overtime period		05:27 – Brad Richardson (1)
Juuse Saros 30 saves / 34 shots		Goalie stats		Darcy Kuemper 49 saves / 52 shots

Arizona won series 3–1

==== (7) Vancouver Canucks vs. (10) Minnesota Wild ====
Vancouver finished seventh in the Western Conference with 78 points in 69 games for a points percentage of .565, losing the tiebreaker against Nashville with 27 RWs. Minnesota gained 77 points in 69 games for a points percentage of .558 to finish tenth in the Western Conference. This was the second playoff meeting between these two teams. Their only previous meeting was in the 2003 Western Conference semifinals, which Minnesota came back from a 3–1 series deficit to win in seven games. Minnesota won two of the three games in this year's regular season series.

The Canucks defeated the Wild in four games. Alex Stalock stopped all 28 shots he faced in Minnesota's game one victory; the Wild won 3–0. In game two, Bo Horvat and Alexander Edler both had a goal and an assist to help Vancouver even the series 1–1 winning the contest 4–3. Quinn Hughes assisted on all three goals and Jacob Markstrom stopped all 27 shots for Vancouver's game three victory. In game four, the Canucks' Christopher Tanev provided two assists and the series-winning overtime goal to send Vancouver to the first round of the playoffs. Tanev's goal at eleven seconds into overtime tied the second fastest playoff overtime goal.

August 2	Minnesota Wild	3–0	Vancouver Canucks	Rogers Place	Recap
Kevin Fiala (1) – pp – 02:50		First period	No scoring
Jared Spurgeon (1) – pp – 10:24		Second period	No scoring
Jared Spurgeon (2) – en – 19:13		Third period	No scoring
Alex Stalock 28 saves / 28 shots		Goalie stats	Jacob Markstrom 28 saves / 30 shots

August 4	Minnesota Wild	3–4	Vancouver Canucks	Rogers Place	Recap
Luke Kunin (1) – sh – 17:16		First period	00:24 – Tanner Pearson (1)
No scoring		Second period	03:01 – J. T. Miller (1); 08:42 – Brock Boeser (1)
Kevin Fiala (2) – 17:31; Kevin Fiala (3) – 19:51		Third period	06:22 – pp – Bo Horvat (1)
Alex Stalock 24 saves / 28 shots		Goalie stats	Jacob Markstrom 32 saves / 35 shots

August 6	Vancouver Canucks	3–0	Minnesota Wild	Rogers Place	Recap
No scoring		First period	No scoring
Brock Boeser (2) – pp – 13:49		Second period	No scoring
Antoine Roussel (1) – 02:18; Elias Pettersson (1) – pp – 18:38		Third period	No scoring
Jacob Markstrom 27 saves / 27 shots		Goalie stats	Alex Stalock 26 saves / 29 shots

August 7	Vancouver Canucks	5–4	OT	Minnesota Wild	Rogers Place	Recap
Tanner Pearson (2) – 12:52		First period		02:58 – pp – Luke Kunin (2); 13:32 – Eric Staal (1)
Brandon Sutter (1) – 07:20; Quinn Hughes (1) – pp – 08:44		Second period		05:39 – Joel Eriksson Ek (1); 19:08 – Nico Sturm (1)
Bo Horvat (2) – 14:14		Third period		No scoring
Christopher Tanev (1) – 00:11		First overtime period		No scoring
Jacob Markstrom 25 saves / 29 shots		Goalie stats		Alex Stalock 26 saves / 31 shots

Vancouver won series 3–1

==== (8) Calgary Flames vs. (9) Winnipeg Jets ====
Calgary finished eighth in the Western Conference with 79 points in 70 games for a points percentage of .564. Winnipeg gained 80 points in 71 games for a points percentage of .563 to finish ninth in the Western Conference. This was the first playoff meeting between the Flames and the new Jets and the fourth overall between these two teams. The original Jets (which had its records consolidated with the new Jets in 2026) won two of the three previous series against the Flames. They last met in the 1987 Smythe Division semifinals, which Winnipeg won in six games. Winnipeg won the only game in this year's regular season series, which was played outdoors.

The Flames defeated the Jets in four games. In game one, the Flames scored a power-play goal, then a short-handed goal, followed by another power-play goal in the second period to take a 4–1 victory. The Jets tied the series 1–1 on Connor Hellebuyck's 28-save performance in a 3–2 victory. In game three, Sean Monahan scored a goal and assisted twice in the Flames' 6–2 victory, giving his team a chance to advance in game four. Cam Talbot led the Flames to the series victory in game four, shutting the Jets out by a score of 4–0, stopping all 31 shots in the process.

August 1	Winnipeg Jets	1–4	Calgary Flames	Rogers Place	Recap
Andrew Copp (1) – 08:51		First period	No scoring
No scoring		Second period	07:06 – pp – Johnny Gaudreau (1); 12:51 – sh – Tobias Rieder (1); 18:14 – pp – Mikael Backlund (1)
No scoring		Third period	18:19 – en – Andrew Mangiapane (1)
Connor Hellebuyck 30 saves / 33 shots		Goalie stats	Cam Talbot 17 saves / 18 shots

August 3	Winnipeg Jets	3–2	Calgary Flames	Rogers Place	Recap
Jansen Harkins (1) – 07:18		First period	No scoring
Adam Lowry (1) – 05:43		Second period	11:29 – Elias Lindholm (1); 17:29 – Sam Bennett (1)
Nikolaj Ehlers (1) – pp – 10:24		Third period	No scoring
Connor Hellebuyck 28 saves / 30 shots		Goalie stats	Cam Talbot 23 saves / 26 shots

August 4	Calgary Flames	6–2	Winnipeg Jets	Rogers Place	Recap
Elias Lindholm (2) – pp – 10:22		First period	10:04 – Nikolaj Ehlers (2)
Mikael Backlund (2) – 05:37; Sean Monahan (1) – pp – 07:49; Matthew Tkachuk (1) – 12:48		Second period	08:09 – pp – Andrew Copp (2)
Milan Lucic (1) – pp – 08:28; Johnny Gaudreau (2) – en – 17:41		Third period	No scoring
Cam Talbot 33 saves / 35 shots		Goalie stats	Connor Hellebuyck 26 saves / 31 shots

August 6	Calgary Flames	4–0	Winnipeg Jets	Rogers Place	Recap
Dillon Dube (1) – 03:21; Sam Bennett (2) – 19:59		First period	No scoring
No scoring		Second period	No scoring
Sean Monahan (2) – en – 16:59; Rasmus Andersson (1) – en – 17:18		Third period	No scoring
Cam Talbot 31 saves / 31 shots		Goalie stats	Connor Hellebuyck 30 saves / 32 shots

Calgary won series 3–1

== First round ==
Note: Teams seeded 1–4 in each conference were based on their final standings from the round-robin. All teams advancing from the qualifying round were re-seeded 5–8 based on their regular season points percentage.

=== Eastern Conference first round ===
==== (1) Philadelphia Flyers vs. (8) Montreal Canadiens ====
Philadelphia earned the first seed in the Eastern Conference after finishing 3–0 in the round-robin; during the regular season they finished with 89 points in 69 games for a .645 points percentage. Montreal earned the eighth seed in the Eastern Conference as the lowest advancing seed from the qualifying round by defeating Pittsburgh. This was the seventh playoff meeting between these two teams with both teams splitting the six previous series. They last met in the 2010 Eastern Conference Final, which Philadelphia won in five games. Philadelphia won two of the three games in this year's regular season series.

The Flyers eliminated the Canadiens in six games. In game one, Carter Hart made 27 saves against the Canadiens, defeating Montreal 2–1. Prior to game two, Canadiens head coach Claude Julien left the bubble due to an emergency stent being placed in his coronary artery. Kirk Muller was named interim head coach for the remainder of the series while Julien recovered in Montreal. Montreal tied the series after game two on Tomas Tatar and Jesperi Kotkaniemi two goals and Carey Price's 30-save 5–0 shut out victory. In game three, Flyers forward Jakub Voracek scored the only goal of the game and Hart turned away all 23 shots in a 1–0 shutout. Hart continued his shutout into game four, stopping all 29 shots in a 2–0 victory. In game five, Joel Armia scored twice for the Canadiens forcing a sixth game after 5–3 victory. Kevin Hayes had a goal and an assist in game six for the Flyers who defeated the Canadiens 3–2 and advanced to the second round.

August 12	Montreal Canadiens	1–2	Philadelphia Flyers	Scotiabank Arena	Recap
No scoring		First period	08:54 – pp – Jakub Voracek (1)
Shea Weber (3) – pp – 14:38		Second period	14:54 – Joel Farabee (2)
No scoring		Third period	No scoring
Carey Price 29 saves / 31 shots		Goalie stats	Carter Hart 27 saves / 28 shots

August 14	Montreal Canadiens	5–0	Philadelphia Flyers	Scotiabank Arena	Recap
Tomas Tatar (1) – 01:02; Jesperi Kotkaniemi (3) – 12:36		First period	No scoring
Tomáš Tatar (2) – pp – 01:25; Joel Armia (1) – 17:57		Second period	No scoring
Jesperi Kotkaniemi (4) – pp – 10:35		Third period	No scoring
Carey Price 30 saves / 30 shots		Goalie stats	Carter Hart 22 saves / 26 shots Brian Elliott 5 saves / 6 shots

August 16	Philadelphia Flyers	1–0	Montreal Canadiens	Scotiabank Arena	Recap
Jakub Voracek (2) – 05:21		First period	No scoring
No scoring		Second period	No scoring
No scoring		Third period	No scoring
Carter Hart 23 saves / 23 shots		Goalie stats	Carey Price 19 saves / 20 shots

August 18	Philadelphia Flyers	2–0	Montreal Canadiens	Scotiabank Arena	Recap
Michael Raffl (2) – 06:32		First period	No scoring
Philippe Myers (2) – 17:04		Second period	No scoring
No scoring		Third period	No scoring
Carter Hart 29 saves / 29 shots		Goalie stats	Carey Price 20 saves / 22 shots

August 19	Montreal Canadiens	5–3	Philadelphia Flyers	Scotiabank Arena	Recap
Joel Armia (2) – sh – 02:53		First period	No scoring
Joel Armia (3) – 10:12; Brendan Gallagher (1) – pp – 11:30		Second period	02:35 – pp – Jakub Voracek (3); 06:37 – pp – Jakub Voracek (4)
Nick Suzuki (2) – 10:59; Phillip Danault (1) – en – 19:42		Third period	10:37 – pp – Joel Farabee (3)
Carey Price 26 saves / 29 shots		Goalie stats	Carter Hart 28 saves / 32 shots

August 21	Philadelphia Flyers	3–2	Montreal Canadiens	Scotiabank Arena	Recap
Ivan Provorov (1) – 00:28; Kevin Hayes (1) – 05:23		First period	10:03 – pp – Nick Suzuki (3)
Michael Raffl (3) – 04:26		Second period	06:05 – Nick Suzuki (4)
No scoring		Third period	No scoring
Carter Hart 31 saves / 33 shots		Goalie stats	Carey Price 14 saves / 17 shots

Philadelphia won series 4–2

==== (2) Tampa Bay Lightning vs. (7) Columbus Blue Jackets ====
Tampa Bay earned the second seed in the Eastern Conference after finishing 2–1 in the round-robin; during the regular season they finished with 92 points in 70 games for a .657 points percentage. Columbus earned the seventh seed in the Eastern Conference as the second lowest advancing seed from the qualifying round by defeating Toronto. This was the second consecutive playoff meeting and second postseason match-up between these two teams. Columbus won last year's Eastern Conference first round playoff meeting in a four-game sweep. Tampa Bay won the only game in this year's regular season series.

The Lightning defeated the Blue Jackets in five games. In game one, with the match tied at two, the teams headed into overtime. At 10:27 of the fifth overtime, Lightning forward Brayden Point ended the 3–2 marathon nearly six hours after its start. It was the fourth-longest game in NHL history. Columbus goaltender Joonas Korpisalo made 85 saves during the affair, the most in a playoff overtime game since 1955–56 when league started keeping saves as a statistic. Normie Smith is considered to have the all-time record for saves in a playoff game when he made 92 saves in a sextuple overtime game in 1936. The Blue Jackets tied the series on Pierre-Luc Dubois's two assists and Korpisalo's 36 saves in game two, winning 3–1. In game three, Point continued his point streak scoring the second goal of a 3–2 Lightning victory. Barclay Goodrow and Yanni Gourde both scored and provided an assist for the Lightning in game four, who defeated the Blue Jackets 2–1 and took a 3–1 series lead. In game five, the Blue Jackets overcame a two-goal deficit to take the lead 4–2, however the Lightning were able to tie the score with 1:38 remaining in the game, which required overtime again. At 5:12 of the first overtime, Point's backhanded shot over Korpisalo ended the series, avenging last year's series for the Lightning, and sending them to the second round.

August 11	Columbus Blue Jackets	2–3	5OT	Tampa Bay Lightning	Scotiabank Arena	Recap
Pierre-Luc Dubois (4) – pp – 02:39		First period		06:27 – Brayden Point (2)
Oliver Bjorkstrand (1) – 19:12		Second period		No scoring
No scoring		Third period		00:23 – Yanni Gourde (1)
No scoring		Fifth overtime period		10:27 – Brayden Point (3)
Joonas Korpisalo 85 saves / 88 shots		Goalie stats		Andrei Vasilevskiy 61 saves / 63 shots

August 13	Columbus Blue Jackets	3–1	Tampa Bay Lightning	Scotiabank Arena	Recap
Ryan Murray (1) – 12:52; Oliver Bjorkstrand (2) – pp – 18:35		First period	05:24 – Nikita Kucherov (2)
No scoring		Second period	No scoring
Alexander Wennberg (2) – 11:27		Third period	No scoring
Joonas Korpisalo 36 saves / 37 shots		Goalie stats	Andrei Vasilevskiy 19 saves / 22 shots

August 15	Tampa Bay Lightning	3–2	Columbus Blue Jackets	Scotiabank Arena	Recap
Alex Killorn (2) – 15:48		First period	No scoring
Brayden Point (4) – 14:16; Victor Hedman (1) – 18:53		Second period	01:49 – Riley Nash (1)
No scoring		Third period	01:37 – Eric Robinson (1)
Andrei Vasilevskiy 15 saves / 17 shots		Goalie stats	Joonas Korpisalo 31 saves / 34 shots

August 17	Tampa Bay Lightning	2–1	Columbus Blue Jackets	Scotiabank Arena	Recap
No scoring		First period	No scoring
Barclay Goodrow (1) – 00:16; Yanni Gourde (2) – 04:09		Second period	05:48 – Cam Atkinson (3)
No scoring		Third period	No scoring
Andrei Vasilevskiy 28 saves / 29 shots		Goalie stats	Joonas Korpisalo 20 saves / 22 shots

August 19	Columbus Blue Jackets	4–5	OT	Tampa Bay Lightning	Scotiabank Arena	Recap
Nick Foligno (2) – 11:51		First period		05:38 – Tyler Johnson (3); 06:39 – Blake Coleman (1)
Kevin Stenlund (1) – pp – 09:35; Alexander Wennberg (3) – 19:44		Second period		No scoring
Oliver Bjorkstrand (3) – 09:33		Third period		12:01 – Kevin Shattenkirk (1); 18:22 – Anthony Cirelli (1)
No scoring		First overtime period		05:12 – Brayden Point (5)
Joonas Korpisalo 20 saves / 25 shots		Goalie stats		Andrei Vasilevskiy 37 saves / 41 shots

Tampa Bay won series 4–1

==== (3) Washington Capitals vs. (6) New York Islanders ====
Washington earned the third seed in the Eastern Conference after finishing 1–2 in the round-robin; during the regular season, they finished with 90 points in 69 games for a .652 points percentage. New York earned the sixth seed in the Eastern Conference as the second-highest advancing seed from the qualifying round by defeating Florida. This was the eighth playoff meeting between these two teams, with the New York Islanders winning five of the seven previous series. They last met in the 2015 Eastern Conference first round, which Washington won in seven games. These teams split the four games in this year's regular season series.

The Islanders defeated the Capitals in five games. In game one, Josh Bailey's short-handed goal at 6:52 of the third period put the Islanders ahead 3–2, and with Anthony Beauvillier's goal to make it 4–2, New York held onto their lead to take the victory. Jean-Gabriel Pageau's two assists helped the Islanders take game two 5–2 taking a 2–0 series lead. The Islanders took a 3–0 series lead after game three ended in overtime on Mathew Barzal's goal, giving New York a 2–1 victory. In game four, Alexander Ovechkin's two goals extended the series for the Capitals in a 3–2 victory. Beauvillier's two goals helped shut the door against the Capitals, defeating them 4–0 and advancing to second round.

August 12	New York Islanders	4–2	Washington Capitals	Scotiabank Arena	Recap
No scoring		First period	No scoring
Jordan Eberle (3) – 18:57		Second period	05:27 – pp – T. J. Oshie (2); 11:18 – pp – T. J. Oshie (3)
Anders Lee (1) – 00:51; Josh Bailey (1) – sh – 06:52; Anthony Beauvillier (4) – 11:55		Third period	No scoring
Semyon Varlamov 24 saves / 26 shots		Goalie stats	Braden Holtby 23 saves / 27 shots

August 14	New York Islanders	5–2	Washington Capitals	Scotiabank Arena	Recap
No scoring		First period	00:56 – Alexander Ovechkin (1)
Nick Leddy (1) – pp – 02:56; Matt Martin (2) – 05:01; Brock Nelson (3) – 06:54		Second period	06:39 – Alexander Ovechkin (2)
Cal Clutterbuck (1) – 17:14; Anders Lee (2) – en – 18:21		Third period	No scoring
Semyon Varlamov 23 saves / 25 shots		Goalie stats	Braden Holtby 27 saves / 31 shots

August 16	Washington Capitals	1–2	OT	New York Islanders	Scotiabank Arena	Recap
No scoring		First period		14:50 – Anders Lee (3)
Evgeny Kuznetsov (2) – pp – 05:50		Second period		No scoring
No scoring		Third period		No scoring
No scoring		First overtime period		04:28 – Mathew Barzal (2)
Braden Holtby 32 saves / 34 shots		Goalie stats		Semyon Varlamov 22 saves / 23 shots

August 18	Washington Capitals	3–2	New York Islanders	Scotiabank Arena	Recap
No scoring		First period	03:50 – Jean-Gabriel Pageau (4); 09:16 – Mathew Barzal (3)
Evgeny Kuznetsov (3) – 03:35; Alexander Ovechkin (3) – pp – 05:29		Second period	No scoring
Alexander Ovechkin (4) – 03:40		Third period	No scoring
Braden Holtby 24 saves / 26 shots		Goalie stats	Semyon Varlamov 26 saves / 29 shots

August 20	New York Islanders	4–0	Washington Capitals	Scotiabank Arena	Recap
Anthony Beauvillier (5) – pp – 10:19		First period	No scoring
Anthony Beauvillier (6) – 09:33		Second period	No scoring
Nick Leddy (2) – en – 17:47; Josh Bailey (2) – en – 18:31		Third period	No scoring
Semyon Varlamov 21 saves / 21 shots		Goalie stats	Braden Holtby 13 saves / 15 shots

New York won series 4–1

==== (4) Boston Bruins vs. (5) Carolina Hurricanes ====
Boston earned the fourth seed in the Eastern Conference after finishing 0–3 in the round-robin; during the regular season they finished with 100 points in 70 games for a .714 points percentage. Carolina earned the fifth seed in the Eastern Conference as the highest advancing seed from the qualifying round by defeating the New York Rangers. This was the second consecutive postseason match-up and sixth playoff meeting overall between these two teams; with Boston winning four of the five previous series. Boston won last year's Eastern Conference Final series in a four-game sweep. Boston won the only game in this year's regular season series.

The Bruins defeated the Hurricanes in five games. Due to game one of the Blue Jackets–Lightning series extending to the fifth overtime, game one of this series was postponed to the next day. The Bruins and Hurricanes had their own overtime marathon in game one with the game tied at three, but the game ended at 1:13 of the second overtime with Patrice Bergeron's goal. In game two, Martin Necas assisted twice for the Hurricanes who defeated the Bruins 3–2. With Tuukka Rask opting to leave the bubble, Jaroslav Halak started game three for the Bruins during which he made 29 saves, defeating the Hurricanes for a 3–1 victory. In game four, the Bruins came back from a 2–0 deficit, scoring four goals in the third period to overtake the Hurricanes by a final score of 4–3. In game five, David Pastrnak assisted twice in a defensive match defeating the Hurricanes 2–1 and advancing to the second round.

August 12	Carolina Hurricanes	3–4	2OT	Boston Bruins	Scotiabank Arena	Recap
Joel Edmundson (1) – 13:02		First period		17:45 – David Pastrnak (1)
Brock McGinn (1) – sh – 04:59		Second period		04:38 – Charlie Coyle (1)
Haydn Fleury (1) – 09:49		Third period		00:59 – David Krejci (1)
No scoring		Second overtime period		01:13 – Patrice Bergeron (1)
Petr Mrazek 36 saves / 40 shots		Goalie stats		Tuukka Rask 25 saves / 28 shots

August 13	Carolina Hurricanes	3–2	Boston Bruins	Scotiabank Arena	Recap
No scoring		First period	15:41 – pp – David Krejci (2)
Teuvo Teravainen (2) – pp – 15:13; Andrei Svechnikov (4) – 16:41		Second period	19:55 – pp – Brad Marchand (1)
Dougie Hamilton (1) – 08:30		Third period	No scoring
James Reimer 33 saves / 35 shots		Goalie stats	Tuukka Rask 23 saves / 26 shots

August 15	Boston Bruins	3–1	Carolina Hurricanes	Scotiabank Arena	Recap
No scoring		First period	No scoring
Charlie Coyle (2) – pp – 00:14		Second period	No scoring
Sean Kuraly (1) – sh – 01:16; Brad Marchand (2) – en – 19:29		Third period	06:30 – pp – Nino Niederreiter (1)
Jaroslav Halak 29 saves / 30 shots		Goalie stats	Petr Mrazek 36 saves / 38 shots

August 17	Boston Bruins	4–3	Carolina Hurricanes	Scotiabank Arena	Recap
No scoring		First period	09:17 – Justin Williams (1)
No scoring		Second period	12:08 – Jordan Martinook (2)
Jake DeBrusk (2) – 07:26; Connor Clifton (1) – 10:10; Brad Marchand (3) – 11:40; Jake DeBrusk (3) – 14:17		Third period	18:33 – Teuvo Teravainen (3)
Jaroslav Halak 16 saves / 19 shots		Goalie stats	James Reimer 29 saves / 33 shots

August 19	Carolina Hurricanes	1–2	Boston Bruins	Scotiabank Arena	Recap
Haydn Fleury (2) – 09:35		First period	No scoring
No scoring		Second period	15:20 – pp – David Krejci (3); 19:56 – pp – Patrice Bergeron (2)
No scoring		Third period	No scoring
Petr Mrazek 25 saves / 27 shots		Goalie stats	Jaroslav Halak 23 saves / 24 shots

Boston won series 4–1

=== Western Conference first round ===
==== (1) Vegas Golden Knights vs. (8) Chicago Blackhawks ====
Vegas earned the first seed in the Western Conference after finishing 3–0 in the round-robin; during the regular season they finished with 86 points in 71 games for a .606 points percentage. Chicago earned the eighth seed in the Western Conference as the lowest advancing seed from the qualifying round by defeating Edmonton. This was the first playoff meeting between these two teams. Vegas won two of the three games in this year's regular season series.

The Golden Knights defeated the Blackhawks in five games. In game one, Reilly Smith scored twice and provided an assist for the Golden Knights' 4–1 victory. Smith then ended game two at 7:13 of the first overtime; his team was victorious by a score of 4–3. In game three, the Golden Knights continued their win streak, defeating the Blackhawks 2–1 on Marc-Andre Fleury's 26 saves. Chicago ended Vegas' win streak in game four, riding on Corey Crawford's 48 saves performance to defeat the Golden Knights 3–1. In game five, Alex Tuch scored the go-ahead goal to put Vegas ahead in the third period. From there, they played defensively, turning away seven shots to win 4–3 and advance to the second round of the playoffs.

August 11	Chicago Blackhawks	1–4	Vegas Golden Knights	Rogers Place	Recap
No scoring		First period	No scoring
David Kampf (1) – sh – 10:51		Second period	07:22 – Shea Theodore (3); 09:39 – William Carrier (2)
No scoring		Third period	03:32 – Reilly Smith (1); 08:14 – Reilly Smith (2)
Corey Crawford 30 saves / 34 shots		Goalie stats	Robin Lehner 19 saves / 20 shots

August 13	Chicago Blackhawks	3–4	OT	Vegas Golden Knights	Rogers Place	Recap
No scoring		First period		10:44 – Paul Stastny (1); 15:35 – Tomas Nosek (1)
Kirby Dach (1) – 03:17; Dominik Kubalik (4) – pp – 12:07; Dylan Strome (2) – 19:46		Second period		17:20 – Mark Stone (3)
No scoring		Third period		No scoring
No scoring		First overtime period		07:13 – Reilly Smith (3)
Corey Crawford 35 saves / 39 shots		Goalie stats		Robin Lehner 22 saves / 25 shots

August 15	Vegas Golden Knights	2–1	Chicago Blackhawks	Rogers Place	Recap
William Karlsson (2) – sh – 04:12		First period	No scoring
Patrick Brown (1) – 15:23		Second period	No scoring
No scoring		Third period	06:21 – Olli Maatta (3)
Marc-Andre Fleury 26 saves / 27 shots		Goalie stats	Corey Crawford 24 saves / 26 shots

August 16	Vegas Golden Knights	1–3	Chicago Blackhawks	Rogers Place	Recap
Shea Theodore (4) – 13:58		First period	04:08 – Drake Caggiula (1); 13:40 – Matthew Highmore (3)
No scoring		Second period	No scoring
No scoring		Third period	19:49 – en – Alex DeBrincat (1)
Robin Lehner 22 saves / 24 shots		Goalie stats	Corey Crawford 48 saves / 49 shots

August 18	Chicago Blackhawks	3–4	Vegas Golden Knights	Rogers Place	Recap
Jonathan Toews (5) – 10:32; Alex DeBrincat (2) – 18:19		First period	19:29 – Max Pacioretty (1)
Patrick Kane (2) – 04:02		Second period	00:57 – Mark Stone (4); 07:28 – pp – Alec Martinez (1)
No scoring		Third period	01:34 – Alex Tuch (4)
Corey Crawford 35 saves / 39 shots		Goalie stats	Robin Lehner 23 saves / 26 shots

Vegas won series 4–1

==== (2) Colorado Avalanche vs. (7) Arizona Coyotes ====
Colorado earned the second seed in the Western Conference after finishing 2–1 in the round-robin; during the regular season they finished with 92 points in 70 games for a .657 points percentage. Arizona earned the seventh seed in the Western Conference as the second lowest advancing seed from the qualifying round by defeating Nashville. This was the second playoff meeting between these two teams. Their only previous meeting was in the 2000 Western Conference quarterfinals, which Colorado won in five games. These teams split their two-game regular season series.

The Avalanche defeated the Coyotes in five games. The Avalanche limited the Coyotes to fourteen shots in game one and Philipp Grubauer stopped all of them in their 3–0 victory. In game two, Avalanche right wing Andre Burakovsky scored the game-winning goal with 2:53 remaining in the third period to defeat the Coyotes 3–2. Darcy Kuemper made 49 saves in game three, giving the Coyotes a 4–2 victory and their first win of the series. The Avalanche provided a defensive and offensive approach to game four routing out the Coyotes 7–1 and limiting their shots to 15 giving them a chance to clinch in game five. In game five, the Avalanche continued their dominance in a 7–1 victory, advancing to the second round on Nathan MacKinnon's two goals and two assists. This would later become the Arizona Coyotes' final playoff appearance during the franchise's existence, as by the end of the 2023–24 NHL season, the Coyotes would initially be considered a suspended operations team, with many of the franchise's assets (but not the team name and its history itself) going to what's considered a newly formed Utah Hockey Club. However, the suspension status would only last for a couple of months before team owner Alex Meruelo gave up the team's rights to the NHL after failing to acquire land from a planned auction in June 2024.

August 12	Arizona Coyotes	0–3	Colorado Avalanche	Rogers Place	Recap
No scoring		First period	No scoring
No scoring		Second period	No scoring
No scoring		Third period	13:05 – pp – Nazem Kadri (2); 13:15 – J. T. Compher (2); 14:28 – Mikko Rantanen (1)
Darcy Kuemper 37 saves / 40 shots		Goalie stats	Philipp Grubauer 14 saves / 14 shots

August 14	Arizona Coyotes	2–3	Colorado Avalanche	Rogers Place	Recap
Clayton Keller (3) – 16:49		First period	03:40 – Nathan MacKinnon (2)
Michael Grabner (3) – 05:06		Second period	03:37 – Tyson Jost (1)
No scoring		Third period	17:07 – Andre Burakovsky (2)
Darcy Kuemper 25 saves / 28 shots		Goalie stats	Philipp Grubauer 30 saves / 32 shots

August 15	Colorado Avalanche	2–4	Arizona Coyotes	Rogers Place	Recap
No scoring		First period	06:29 – Derek Stepan (1)
Andre Burakovsky (3) – 13:12		Second period	19:26 – Brad Richardson (2)
Mikko Rantanen (2) – 19:03		Third period	18:40 – en – Taylor Hall (2); 19:55 – en – Lawson Crouse (2)
Pavel Francouz 19 saves / 21 shots		Goalie stats	Darcy Kuemper 49 saves / 51 shots

August 17	Colorado Avalanche	7–1	Arizona Coyotes	Rogers Place	Recap
Matt Nieto (1) – 14:07; Nazem Kadri (3) – pp – 16:07; Nazem Kadri (4) – pp – 19:39		First period	No scoring
Joonas Donskoi (3) – 11:37		Second period	13:31 – pp – Jakob Chychrun (1)
Cale Makar (2) – 00:19; Matt Calvert (1) – 02:57; Mikko Rantanen (3) – pp – 16:24		Third period	No scoring
Philipp Grubauer 14 saves / 15 shots		Goalie stats	Darcy Kuemper 18 saves / 22 shots Antti Raanta 5 saves / 8 shots

August 19	Arizona Coyotes	1–7	Colorado Avalanche	Rogers Place	Recap
No scoring		First period	04:39 – pp – Nazem Kadri (5); 08:29 – pp – Sam Girard (1); 18:32 – Nazem Kadri (6)
No scoring		Second period	09:51 – Nathan MacKinnon (3); 10:49 – pp – Nathan MacKinnon (4); 18:16 – Nikita Zadorov (1)
Clayton Keller (4) – 06:51		Third period	15:19 – J. T. Compher (3)
Darcy Kuemper 24 saves / 30 shots Antti Raanta 5 saves / 6 shots		Goalie stats	Philipp Grubauer 23 saves / 24 shots

Colorado won series 4–1

==== (3) Dallas Stars vs. (6) Calgary Flames ====
Dallas earned the third seed in the Western Conference after finishing 1–2 in the round-robin; during the regular season they finished with 82 points in 69 games for a .594 points percentage. Calgary earned the sixth seed in the Western Conference as the second highest advancing seed from the qualifying round by defeating Winnipeg. This was the second playoff meeting between these two teams. Their only previous meeting was in the 1981 Stanley Cup Semifinals, which the then-Minnesota North Stars won in six games. Calgary won two of the three games in this year's regular season series.

The Stars eliminated the Flames in six games. Dillon Dube scored twice for Calgary in game one as the Flames took the victory 3–2. In game two, with forty seconds remaining, Jamie Oleksiak scored the game-winning goal for Dallas defeating Calgary 5–4. Cam Talbot stopped all 35 shots he faced in game three defeating the Stars 2–0 and taking a 2–1 series lead. In game four, Stars forward Joe Pavelski scored a hat trick and Alexander Radulov's overtime-game winner tied the series 2–2, defeating the Flames 5–4. Anton Khudobin made 28 saves for the Stars in game five, defeating the Flames 2–1 and taking a 3–2 series lead. In game six, the Stars recovered from a 3–0 deficit led by Denis Gurianov's four goals, completing the series with a 7–3 victory.

August 11	Calgary Flames	3–2	Dallas Stars	Rogers Place	Recap
Dillon Dube (2) – pp – 10:54; Dillon Dube (3) – 18:02		First period	No scoring
Rasmus Andersson (2) – 16:01		Second period	10:52 – Denis Gurianov (1); 11:01 – Jamie Benn (1)
No scoring		Third period	No scoring
Cam Talbot 24 saves / 26 shots		Goalie stats	Anton Khudobin 23 saves / 26 shots

August 13	Calgary Flames	4–5	Dallas Stars	Rogers Place	Recap
Dillon Dube (4) – 00:19		First period	02:42 – Alexander Radulov (1); 11:14 – Miro Heiskanen (1)
Derek Forbort (1) – 13:00		Second period	04:50 – Miro Heiskanen (2); 15:05 – pp – Corey Perry (2)
Tobias Rieder (2) – sh – 12:24; Sam Bennett (3) – pp – 17:11		Third period	19:20 – Jamie Oleksiak (2)
Cam Talbot 31 saves / 36 shots		Goalie stats	Ben Bishop 22 saves / 26 shots

August 14	Dallas Stars	0–2	Calgary Flames	Rogers Place	Recap
No scoring		First period	No scoring
No scoring		Second period	05:58 – sh – Mikael Backlund (3)
No scoring		Third period	10:36 – T. J. Brodie (1)
Anton Khudobin 21 saves / 23 shots		Goalie stats	Cam Talbot 35 saves / 35 shots

August 16	Dallas Stars	5–4	OT	Calgary Flames	Rogers Place	Recap
Joe Pavelski (3) – pp – 18:11		First period		No scoring
Joe Pavelski (4) – 03:14; Denis Gurianov (2) – pp – 19:23		Second period		01:54 – pp – Johnny Gaudreau (3); 03:57 – pp – Sam Bennett (4); 14:50 – Sam Bennett (5)
Joe Pavelski (5) – 19:48		Third period		03:11 – sh – Tobias Rieder (3)
Alexander Radulov (2) – 16:05		First overtime period		No scoring
Anton Khudobin 36 saves / 40 shots		Goalie stats		Cam Talbot 57 saves / 62 shots

August 18	Calgary Flames	1–2	Dallas Stars	Rogers Place	Recap
Mikael Backlund (4) – 19:14		First period	10:13 – sh – Jamie Benn (2)
No scoring		Second period	No scoring
No scoring		Third period	01:12 – John Klingberg (1)
Cam Talbot 30 saves / 32 shots		Goalie stats	Anton Khudobin 28 saves / 29 shots

August 20	Dallas Stars	7–3	Calgary Flames	Rogers Place	Recap
Miro Heiskanen (3) – pp – 09:36		First period	03:42 – Andrew Mangiapane (2); 05:38 – pp – Johnny Gaudreau (4); 06:34 – Rasmus Andersson (3)
Denis Gurianov (3) – 00:59; Denis Gurianov (4) – 03:25; Radek Faksa (1) – pp – 05:47; Joe Pavelski (6) – 07:22; Denis Gurianov (5) – 15:30		Second period	No scoring
Denis Gurianov (6) – 09:02		Third period	No scoring
Anton Khudobin 38 saves / 41 shots		Goalie stats	Cam Talbot 11 saves / 15 shots David Rittich 6 saves / 9 shots

Dallas won series 4–2

==== (4) St. Louis Blues vs. (5) Vancouver Canucks ====
St. Louis earned the fourth seed in the Western Conference after finishing 0–3 in the round-robin; during the regular season they finished with 94 points in 71 games for a .662 points percentage. Vancouver earned the fifth seed in the Western Conference as the highest advancing seed from the qualifying round by defeating Minnesota. This was the fourth playoff meeting between these two teams, with Vancouver winning all three previous series. They last met in the 2009 Western Conference quarterfinals, which Vancouver won in a four-game sweep. Vancouver won two of the three games in this year's regular season series.

The Canucks defeated the Blues in six games. Canucks captain Bo Horvat scored twice in game one, defeating the Blues 5–2. Although Blues forward Samuel Blais tied game two with seven seconds remaining, Horvat's second goal of the game at 5:55 of overtime gave the Canucks a 4–3 victory and a 2–0 series lead. In game three, Jake Allen made 39 saves and Brayden Schenn scored the overtime-game winning goal, defeating the Canucks 3–2. The Blues evened up the series in game four, with Ryan O'Reilly scoring twice in a 3–1 victory. Vancouver came back from a two-goal deficit in game five to defeat St. Louis 4–3 and take a 3–2 series lead. Tyler Motte scored twice in game six, sending the Canucks to the second round and handily defeating the Blues 6–2.

August 12	Vancouver Canucks	5–2	St. Louis Blues	Rogers Place	Recap
Bo Horvat (3) – pp – 04:29		First period	16:37 – pp – David Perron (3)
Elias Pettersson (2) – pp – 08:37		Second period	09:49 – Jaden Schwartz (1)
Troy Stecher (1) – 05:37; Bo Horvat (4) – 08:01; J. T. Miller (2) – pp – 19:21		Third period	No scoring
Jacob Markstrom 29 saves / 31 shots		Goalie stats	Jordan Binnington 17 saves / 22 shots

August 14	Vancouver Canucks	4–3	OT	St. Louis Blues	Rogers Place	Recap
Bo Horvat (5) – sh – 07:23		First period		No scoring
Tanner Pearson (3) – pp – 13:01		Second period		18:56 – pp – Ryan O'Reilly (1)
Elias Pettersson (3) – pp – 05:36		Third period		09:02 – Samuel Blais (1); 19:53 – Jaden Schwartz (2)
Bo Horvat (6) – 05:55		First overtime period		No scoring
Jacob Markstrom 34 saves / 37 shots		Goalie stats		Jordan Binnington 21 saves / 25 shots

August 16	St. Louis Blues	3–2	OT	Vancouver Canucks	Rogers Place	Recap
No scoring		First period		No scoring
Justin Faulk (1) – 08:16; David Perron (4) – 18:02		Second period		01:19 – pp – J. T. Miller (3); 18:39 – Elias Pettersson (4)
No scoring		Third period		No scoring
Brayden Schenn (1) – 15:06		First overtime period		No scoring
Jake Allen 39 saves / 41 shots		Goalie stats		Jacob Markstrom 46 saves / 49 shots

August 17	St. Louis Blues	3–1	Vancouver Canucks	Rogers Place	Recap
Ryan O'Reilly (2) – pp – 16:43		First period	No scoring
Ryan O'Reilly (3) – 06:52; Alex Pietrangelo (1) – pp – 15:47		Second period	00:40 – J. T. Miller (4)
No scoring		Third period	No scoring
Jake Allen 22 saves / 23 shots		Goalie stats	Jacob Markstrom 34 saves / 37 shots

August 19	Vancouver Canucks	4–3	St. Louis Blues	Rogers Place	Recap
Tyler Motte (1) – sh – 13:15		First period	15:41 – Brayden Schenn (2); 19:31 – Ryan O'Reilly (4)
J. T. Miller (5) – 11:54; Jake Virtanen (1) – 16:08; Tyler Motte (2) – 18:17		Second period	05:51 – pp – Zach Sanford (1)
No scoring		Third period	No scoring
Jacob Markstrom 36 saves / 39 shots		Goalie stats	Jake Allen 26 saves / 30 shots

August 21	St. Louis Blues	2–6	Vancouver Canucks	Rogers Place	Recap
No scoring		First period	03:45 – Jay Beagle (1)
No scoring		Second period	02:09 – Antoine Roussel (2); 06:49 – Troy Stecher (2); 08:06 – pp – Brock Boeser (3)
Jaden Schwartz (3) – 06:32; Jaden Schwartz (4) – 18:38		Third period	13:19 – Tyler Motte (3); 19:10 – en – Tyler Motte (4)
Jordan Binnington 14 saves / 18 shots Jake Allen 5 saves / 6 shots		Goalie stats	Jacob Markstrom 34 saves / 36 shots

Vancouver won series 4–2

== Second round ==
=== Eastern Conference second round ===
==== (1) Philadelphia Flyers vs. (6) New York Islanders ====
This was the fifth playoff meeting between these two teams, with Philadelphia winning three of the four previous series. They last met in the 1987 Patrick Division finals, which Philadelphia won in seven games. New York won all three games in this year's regular season series.

The Islanders upset the Flyers in seven games after giving up a 3–1 series lead. Semyon Varlamov posted his second consecutive shutout in game one, stopping all 29 shots for 4–0 Islanders victory. The Flyers prevented a three-goal comeback from the Islanders in game two with Philippe Myers' goal at 2:41 of overtime to defeat New York 4–3. Varlamov made 26 saves for the Islanders in game three, emerging victorious 3–1. In game four, Brock Nelson scored twice and Thomas Greiss made 36 saves for the Islanders in a 3–2 victory. Although the Flyers dropped a 3–1 lead in the third period of game five, they forced a sixth game on Scott Laughton's overtime goal to win 4–3. In game six, the Flyers held a back-and-forth affair reaching the second overtime where Ivan Provorov's goal at 15:03 kept Philadelphia's season alive, defeating New York 5–4. In game seven, Brock Nelson had a goal and two assists and Greiss stopped all sixteen shots he faced in a 4–0 shutout to send the Islanders to the Eastern Conference Final for the first time in 27 years.

August 24	New York Islanders	4–0	Philadelphia Flyers	Scotiabank Arena	Recap
Andy Greene (1) – 06:06		First period	No scoring
No scoring		Second period	No scoring
Jean-Gabriel Pageau (5) – 02:54; Anders Lee (4) – 08:50; Devon Toews (1) – en – 12:21		Third period	No scoring
Semyon Varlamov 29 saves / 29 shots		Goalie stats	Carter Hart 25 saves / 28 shots

August 26	New York Islanders	3–4	OT	Philadelphia Flyers	Scotiabank Arena	Recap
No scoring		First period		01:57 – Kevin Hayes (2); 09:43 – Kevin Hayes (3); 15:09 – Sean Couturier (1)
Anders Lee (5) – pp – 11:45		Second period		No scoring
Anthony Beauvillier (7) – 11:11; Jean-Gabriel Pageau (6) – 17:51		Third period		No scoring
No scoring		First overtime period		02:41 – Philippe Myers (3)
Semyon Varlamov 7 saves / 10 shots Thomas Greiss 20 saves / 21 shots		Goalie stats		Carter Hart 31 saves / 34 shots

August 29	Philadelphia Flyers	1–3	New York Islanders	Scotiabank Arena	Recap
Tyler Pitlick (2) – 14:18		First period	No scoring
No scoring		Second period	07:12 – Matt Martin (3); 19:54 – Leo Komarov (1)
No scoring		Third period	03:41 – pp – Anders Lee (6)
Carter Hart 26 saves / 29 shots		Goalie stats	Semyon Varlamov 26 saves / 27 shots

August 30	Philadelphia Flyers	2–3	New York Islanders	Scotiabank Arena	Recap
No scoring		First period	No scoring
Sean Couturier (2) – 15:19		Second period	06:52 – Brock Nelson (4)
Ivan Provorov (2) – 18:55		Third period	07:18 – Jean-Gabriel Pageau (7); 11:12 – Brock Nelson (5)
Brian Elliott 30 saves / 33 shots		Goalie stats	Thomas Greiss 36 saves / 38 shots

September 1	New York Islanders	3–4	OT	Philadelphia Flyers	Scotiabank Arena	Recap
No scoring		First period		No scoring
Mathew Barzal (4) – pp – 01:20		Second period		15:45 – Claude Giroux (1); 18:18 – James van Riemsdyk (1)
Brock Nelson (6) – 15:46; Derick Brassard (1) – 17:19		Third period		04:32 – Matt Niskanen (1)
No scoring		First overtime period		12:20 – Scott Laughton (4)
Semyon Varlamov 28 saves / 32 shots		Goalie stats		Carter Hart 29 saves / 32 shots

September 3	Philadelphia Flyers	5–4	2OT	New York Islanders	Scotiabank Arena	Recap
Kevin Hayes (4) – 10:16; James van Riemsdyk (2) – 11:52		First period		16:33 – Derick Brassard (2)
Michael Raffl (4) – 13:21		Second period		01:24 – Matt Martin (4); 03:06 – pp – Anders Lee (7); 19:30 – Mathew Barzal (5)
Scott Laughton (5) – 09:53		Third period		No scoring
Ivan Provorov (3) – 15:03		Second overtime period		No scoring
Carter Hart 49 saves / 53 shots		Goalie stats		Semyon Varlamov 26 saves / 31 shots

September 5	New York Islanders	4–0	Philadelphia Flyers	Scotiabank Arena	Recap
Scott Mayfield (1) – 09:27; Andy Greene (2) – 13:12		First period	No scoring
Brock Nelson (7) – 11:26		Second period	No scoring
Anthony Beauvillier (8) – en – 13:42		Third period	No scoring
Thomas Greiss 16 saves / 16 shots		Goalie stats	Carter Hart 22 saves / 25 shots

New York won series 4–3

==== (2) Tampa Bay Lightning vs. (4) Boston Bruins ====
This was the third playoff series between these two teams with both teams splitting the two previous series. They last met in the 2018 Eastern Conference second round, which Tampa Bay won in five games. Tampa Bay won the round-robin game between these two teams earlier in this year's playoffs 3–2. Tampa Bay won three of four games in this year's regular season series.

The Lightning defeated the Bruins in five games. Jaroslav Halak made 35 saves for the Bruins in game one who defeated the Lightning 3–2. In game two, Ondrej Palat scored the overtime-winning goal for Tampa Bay, tying the series 1–1 in a 4–3. victory. The Lightning had an offensive outburst in game three, scoring seven goals against Boston in a 7–1 rout. Palat scored twice for the Lightning in game four, defeating the Bruins 3–1 and taking a 3–1 series lead. In game five, Victor Hedman ended the series 14:10 into double-overtime for the Lightning, defeating the Bruins 3–2 and advancing to the Eastern Conference Final.

August 23	Boston Bruins	3–2	Tampa Bay Lightning	Scotiabank Arena	Recap
Charlie Coyle (3) – 18:52		First period	No scoring
David Pastrnak (2) – pp – 04:34		Second period	No scoring
Brad Marchand (4) – 01:17		Third period	08:50 – Victor Hedman (2); 18:46 – Victor Hedman (3)
Jaroslav Halak 35 saves / 37 shots		Goalie stats	Andrei Vasilevskiy 28 saves / 31 shots

August 25	Boston Bruins	3–4	OT	Tampa Bay Lightning	Scotiabank Arena	Recap
Nick Ritchie (1) – 03:14		First period		12:42 – Blake Coleman (2)
Brad Marchand (5) – pp – 14:33		Second period		15:28 – Nikita Kucherov (3)
Brad Marchand (6) – 16:02		Third period		10:40 – Blake Coleman (3)
No scoring		First overtime period		04:40 – Ondrej Palat (1)
Jaroslav Halak 36 saves / 40 shots		Goalie stats		Andrei Vasilevskiy 22 saves / 25 shots

August 26	Tampa Bay Lightning	7–1	Boston Bruins	Scotiabank Arena	Recap
Ondrej Palat (2) – pp – 12:46; Yanni Gourde (3) – 13:01		First period	No scoring
Mikhail Sergachev (1) – pp – 02:14; Alex Killorn (3) – pp – 08:35; Brayden Point (6) – 15:23; Alex Killorn (4) – 18:01		Second period	04:56 – pp – Brad Marchand (7)
Nikita Kucherov (4) – 03:58		Third period	No scoring
Andrei Vasilevskiy 23 saves / 24 shots		Goalie stats	Jaroslav Halak 12 saves / 16 shots Daniel Vladar 12 saves / 15 shots

August 29	Tampa Bay Lightning	3–1	Boston Bruins	Scotiabank Arena	Recap
Ondrej Palat (3) – 08:59		First period	No scoring
Ondrej Palat (4) – 12:29; Victor Hedman (4) – pp – 18:04		Second period	No scoring
No scoring		Third period	07:04 – pp – Jake DeBrusk (4)
Andrei Vasilevskiy 29 saves / 30 shots		Goalie stats	Jaroslav Halak 23 saves / 26 shots

August 31	Boston Bruins	2–3	2OT	Tampa Bay Lightning	Scotiabank Arena	Recap
No scoring		First period		No scoring
David Pastrnak (3) – pp – 12:38		Second period		04:21 – Ondrej Palat (5)
David Krejci (4) – 17:27		Third period		12:03 – Anthony Cirelli (2)
No scoring		Second overtime period		14:10 – Victor Hedman (5)
Jaroslav Halak 32 saves / 35 shots		Goalie stats		Andrei Vasilevskiy 45 saves / 47 shots

Tampa Bay won series 4–1

=== Western Conference second round ===
==== (1) Vegas Golden Knights vs. (5) Vancouver Canucks ====
This was the first playoff meeting between these two teams. These two teams split their two-game regular season series.

The Golden Knights defeated the Canucks in seven games after giving up a 3–1 series lead. In game one, Robin Lehner stopped all 26 shots he faced as the Golden Knights defeated the Canucks 5–0. Jacob Markstrom made 38 saves for the Canucks in game two, tying the series 1–1 and defeating the Golden Knights 5–2. Lehner posted his second shutout of the series, stopping all 31 shots in game three, defeating the Canucks 3–0. Max Pacioretty scored twice and provided an assist for the Golden Knights in game four, who defeated the Canucks 5–3 to take a 3–1 series lead. In game five, rookie goaltender Thatcher Demko made 42 saves for the Canucks, defeating the Golden Knights 2–1 to force a sixth game. Demko shut out the Golden Knights in game six, stopping all 48 shots he faced in a 4–0 victory. In game seven, the Golden Knights limited the Canucks' shots to fourteen throughout three periods, shutting out Vancouver 3–0 and advancing to the Western Conference Final.

August 23	Vancouver Canucks	0–5	Vegas Golden Knights	Rogers Place	Recap
No scoring		First period	11:37 – Jonathan Marchessault (3)
No scoring		Second period	02:13 – pp – Reilly Smith (4); 11:35 – Mark Stone (5); 16:34 – Alex Tuch (5)
No scoring		Third period	10:47 – Max Pacioretty (2)
Jacob Markstrom 29 saves / 34 shots Thatcher Demko 5 saves / 5 shots		Goalie stats	Robin Lehner 26 saves / 26 shots

August 25	Vancouver Canucks	5–2	Vegas Golden Knights	Rogers Place	Recap
Tyler Toffoli (1) – 01:29; Bo Horvat (7) – pp – 10:59		First period	No scoring
Elias Pettersson (5) – 18:35		Second period	06:34 – Alex Tuch (6)
Bo Horvat (8) – 00:18; Tanner Pearson (4) – en – 19:30		Third period	18:34 – pp – Max Pacioretty (3)
Jacob Markstrom 38 saves / 40 shots		Goalie stats	Robin Lehner 22 saves / 26 shots

August 29	Vegas Golden Knights	3–0	Vancouver Canucks	Rogers Place	Recap
Alex Tuch (7) – 04:05; Zach Whitecloud (2) – 05:28		First period	No scoring
No scoring		Second period	No scoring
Mark Stone (6) – pp – 02:19		Third period	No scoring
Robin Lehner 31 saves / 31 shots		Goalie stats	Jacob Markstrom 31 saves / 34 shots

August 30	Vegas Golden Knights	5–3	Vancouver Canucks	Rogers Place	Recap
Max Pacioretty (4) – pp – 09:28; Chandler Stephenson (2) – 13:19		First period	11:15 – pp – Elias Pettersson (6)
No scoring		Second period	04:07 – Bo Horvat (9); 11:26 – pp – Tyler Toffoli (2)
Nate Schmidt (2) – 02:52; Max Pacioretty (5) – 07:02; William Karlsson (3) – 08:29		Third period	No scoring
Marc-Andre Fleury 28 saves / 31 shots		Goalie stats	Jacob Markstrom 28 saves / 33 shots

September 1	Vancouver Canucks	2–1	Vegas Golden Knights	Rogers Place	Recap
No scoring		First period	No scoring
Brock Boeser (4) – 15:36		Second period	15:12 – Shea Theodore (5)
Elias Pettersson (7) – 03:19		Third period	No scoring
Thatcher Demko 42 saves / 43 shots		Goalie stats	Robin Lehner 15 saves / 17 shots

September 3	Vegas Golden Knights	0–4	Vancouver Canucks	Rogers Place	Recap
No scoring		First period	02:50 – Jake Virtanen (2)
No scoring		Second period	No scoring
No scoring		Third period	01:03 – J. T. Miller (6); 08:16 – Quinn Hughes (2); 15:22 – en – Bo Horvat (10)
Robin Lehner 19 saves / 22 shots		Goalie stats	Thatcher Demko 48 saves / 48 shots

September 4	Vancouver Canucks	0–3	Vegas Golden Knights	Rogers Place	Recap
No scoring		First period	No scoring
No scoring		Second period	No scoring
No scoring		Third period	13:52 – pp – Shea Theodore (6); 17:54 – en – Alex Tuch (8); 19:54 – en – Paul Stastny (2)
Thatcher Demko 33 saves / 34 shots		Goalie stats	Robin Lehner 14 saves / 14 shots

Vegas won series 4–3

==== (2) Colorado Avalanche vs. (3) Dallas Stars ====
This was the fifth playoff series between these two teams, with both teams splitting the four previous series. They last met in the 2006 Western Conference quarterfinals, which Colorado won in five games. Colorado won the round-robin game between these two teams earlier in this year's playoffs 4–0. Dallas won all four games in this year's regular season series.

The Stars defeated the Avalanche in seven games after giving up a 3–1 series lead. In game one, Alexander Radulov scored twice, also providing an assist, in a 5–3 victory for the Stars. After falling behind 2–0 in game two, the Stars rallied past the Avalanche, scoring four goals in the second period and defeating Colorado 5–2. In game three, the Avalanche spoiled a two-goal comeback by the Stars, scoring three straight in the third period with 7:58 remaining to defeat Dallas 6–4. The Stars held off a late rally by the Avalanche in game four, keeping the score at 5–4 and taking a 3–1 series lead with the victory. In game five, the Avalanche had a first period offensive outburst, scoring five goals, including four within a span of 2:36 (one second from equalling the league record for the fastest four goals by one team in a game in playoff history) to win 6–3. Nathan MacKinnon extended his point streak to fourteen games, scoring a goal and recording an assist in game six to defeat the Stars 4–1 and force a seventh game. In game seven, the two teams battled it throughout three periods scoring four against each other, but 7:24 into overtime Joel Kiviranta's hat trick goal gave the Stars the victory, advancing to the Western Conference Final with a 5–4 victory.

August 22	Dallas Stars	5–3	Colorado Avalanche	Rogers Place	Recap
Tyler Seguin (1) – 04:00; Blake Comeau (1) – 09:51; Alexander Radulov (3) – 16:28		First period	05:04 – Nathan MacKinnon (5)
Alexander Radulov (4) – 09:09		Second period	04:36 – Gabriel Landeskog (1); 18:29 – Nathan MacKinnon (6)
Roope Hintz (1) – 08:47		Third period	No scoring
Anton Khudobin 28 saves / 31 shots		Goalie stats	Philipp Grubauer 7 saves / 10 shots Pavel Francouz 18 saves / 20 shots

August 24	Dallas Stars	5–2	Colorado Avalanche	Rogers Place	Recap
No scoring		First period	06:08 – pp – Nathan MacKinnon (7)
Joe Pavelski (7) – pp – 09:54; Radek Faksa (2) – pp – 10:37; Alexander Radulov (5) – 15:34; Esa Lindell (1) – 19:14		Second period	08:44 – pp – Mikko Rantanen (4)
Jamie Oleksiak (3) – en – 19:50		Third period	No scoring
Anton Khudobin 38 saves / 40 shots		Goalie stats	Pavel Francouz 22 saves / 26 shots

August 26	Colorado Avalanche	6–4	Dallas Stars	Rogers Place	Recap
No scoring		First period	11:12 – Tyler Seguin (2)
Nikita Zadorov (2) – 01:00; Andre Burakovsky (4) – 04:41; Gabriel Landeskog (2) – 11:00		Second period	No scoring
Mikko Rantanen (5) – 12:02; Nazem Kadri (7) – 13:54; Pierre-Edouard Bellemare (1) – en – 18:26		Third period	04:42 – Denis Gurianov (7); 09:02 – Blake Comeau (2); 10:47 – Jamie Benn (3)
Pavel Francouz 33 saves / 37 shots		Goalie stats	Anton Khudobin 26 saves / 31 shots

August 30	Colorado Avalanche	4–5	Dallas Stars	Rogers Place	Recap
No scoring		First period	06:18 – John Klingberg (2); 08:33 – pp – Radek Faksa (3); 10:45 – pp – Jamie Benn (4)
Valeri Nichushkin (1) – 13:24; Cale Makar (3) – pp – 19:34		Second period	No scoring
Valeri Nichushkin (2) – 11:24; Vladislav Namestnikov (2) – 19:56		Third period	07:30 – pp – Roope Hintz (2); 08:02 – Denis Gurianov (8)
Pavel Francouz 21 saves / 26 shots Michael Hutchinson 3 saves / 3 shots		Goalie stats	Anton Khudobin 33 saves / 37 shots

August 31	Dallas Stars	3–6	Colorado Avalanche	Rogers Place	Recap
No scoring		First period	04:37 – Pierre-Edouard Bellemare (2); 11:51 – Andre Burakovsky (5); 12:32 – Nathan MacKinnon (8); 13:43 – Nazem Kadri (8); 14:27 – Mikko Rantanen (6)
Joe Pavelski (8) – 07:50; Miro Heiskanen (4) – pp – 17:31		Second period	18:04 – Andre Burakovsky (6)
Jamie Benn (5) – pp – 14:12		Third period	No scoring
Ben Bishop 15 saves / 19 shots Anton Khudobin 20 saves / 22 shots		Goalie stats	Michael Hutchinson 31 saves / 34 shots

September 2	Colorado Avalanche	4–1	Dallas Stars	Rogers Place	Recap
Nikita Zadorov (3) – 19:28		First period	17:35 – Miro Heiskanen (5)
Cale Makar (4) – 07:48		Second period	No scoring
Mikko Rantanen (7) – 03:21; Nathan MacKinnon (9) – en – 17:14		Third period	No scoring
Michael Hutchinson 27 saves / 28 shots		Goalie stats	Anton Khudobin 20 saves / 23 shots

September 4	Dallas Stars	5–4	OT	Colorado Avalanche	Rogers Place	Recap
Alexander Radulov (6) – pp – 02:39		First period		03:48 – Vladislav Namestnikov (3); 09:43 – Andre Burakovsky (7)
Joel Kiviranta (1) – 03:06		Second period		05:45 – pp – Nazem Kadri (9)
Alexander Radulov (7) – pp – 11:28; Joel Kiviranta (2) – 16:30		Third period		16:20 – Vladislav Namestnikov (4)
Joel Kiviranta (3) – 07:24		First overtime period		No scoring
Anton Khudobin 40 saves / 44 shots		Goalie stats		Michael Hutchinson 30 saves / 35 shots

Dallas won series 4–3

== Conference finals ==
=== Eastern Conference final ===
==== (2) Tampa Bay Lightning vs. (6) New York Islanders ====
This was the third playoff meeting between these two teams with Tampa Bay winning both previous series. They last met in the 2016 Eastern Conference second round, which Tampa Bay won in five games. This was Tampa Bay's sixth conference finals appearance. They last went to the conference finals in 2018, which they lost to the Washington Capitals in seven games. This was New York's seventh semifinal/conference final appearance since the league began using a 16-team or greater playoff format in 1980. They last went to the conference finals in 1993, which they lost against the Montreal Canadiens in five games. New York won two of the three games in this year's regular season series.

The Lightning defeated the Islanders in six games. In game one, Lightning forwards Brayden Point and Nikita Kucherov both had five points in an 8–2 rout: Point had two goals and three assists and Kucherov scored a goal and assisted four times. Kucherov scored the game-winning goal with nine seconds remaining in game two to give the Lightning a 2–1 victory. After giving up a 3–1 lead in game three, Brock Nelson's goal with 3:25 left put the Islanders ahead, emerging victorious 5–3. In game four, three Lightning players had two points and goaltender Andrei Vasilevskiy provided an assist in Tampa Bay's 4–1 victory to take a 3–1 series lead. In game five, Islanders forward Jordan Eberle scored at 12:30 of double overtime to win the game 2–1 and extend the series to a sixth game. Anthony Cirelli's goal at 13:18 of the first overtime period in game six gave the Lightning a 2–1 victory sending Tampa Bay to the Stanley Cup Final for the first time since 2015.

September 7	New York Islanders	2–8	Tampa Bay Lightning	Rogers Place	Recap
Jordan Eberle (4) – pp – 04:33		First period	01:14 – Brayden Point (7); 08:12 – pp – Victor Hedman (6); 10:46 – Ryan McDonagh (1)
No scoring		Second period	04:03 – Yanni Gourde (4); 13:18 – pp – Brayden Point (8)
Nick Leddy (3) – 08:46		Third period	05:51 – Nikita Kucherov (5); 09:31 – Ondrej Palat (6); 13:15 – pp – Yanni Gourde (5)
Thomas Greiss 6 saves / 9 shots Semyon Varlamov 20 saves / 25 shots		Goalie stats	Andrei Vasilevskiy 22 saves / 24 shots

September 9	New York Islanders	1–2	Tampa Bay Lightning	Rogers Place	Recap
Matt Martin (5) – 01:24		First period	18:25 – Victor Hedman (7)
No scoring		Second period	No scoring
No scoring		Third period	19:51 – Nikita Kucherov (6)
Semyon Varlamov 19 saves / 21 shots		Goalie stats	Andrei Vasilevskiy 27 saves / 28 shots

September 11	Tampa Bay Lightning	3–5	New York Islanders	Rogers Place	Recap
Mikhail Sergachev (2) – 16:31		First period	12:58 – Cal Clutterbuck (2)
No scoring		Second period	11:50 – Adam Pelech (1); 13:50 – Anthony Beauvillier (9)
Ondrej Palat (7) – pp – 02:32; Tyler Johnson (4) – 12:04		Third period	16:35 – Brock Nelson (8); 19:24 – en – Jean-Gabriel Pageau (8)
Andrei Vasilevskiy 31 saves / 35 shots		Goalie stats	Semyon Varlamov 34 saves / 37 shots

September 13	Tampa Bay Lightning	4–1	New York Islanders	Rogers Place	Recap
No scoring		First period	No scoring
Blake Coleman (4) – 11:42; Ondrej Palat (8) – 11:54		Second period	11:27 – Brock Nelson (9)
Brayden Point (9) – 03:33; Patrick Maroon (1) – en – 17:36		Third period	No scoring
Andrei Vasilevskiy 26 saves / 27 shots		Goalie stats	Semyon Varlamov 32 saves / 35 shots

September 15	New York Islanders	2–1	2OT	Tampa Bay Lightning	Rogers Place	Recap
Ryan Pulock (2) – pp – 15:41		First period		No scoring
No scoring		Second period		04:00 – Victor Hedman (8)
No scoring		Third period		No scoring
Jordan Eberle (5) – 12:30		Second overtime period		No scoring
Semyon Varlamov 36 saves / 37 shots		Goalie stats		Andrei Vasilevskiy 22 saves / 24 shots

September 17	Tampa Bay Lightning	2–1	OT	New York Islanders	Rogers Place	Recap
Victor Hedman (9) – 06:28		First period		04:15 – Devon Toews (2)
No scoring		Second period		No scoring
No scoring		Third period		No scoring
Anthony Cirelli (3) – 13:18		First overtime period		No scoring
Andrei Vasilevskiy 26 saves / 27 shots		Goalie stats		Semyon Varlamov 46 saves / 48 shots

Tampa Bay won series 4–2

=== Western Conference final ===
==== (1) Vegas Golden Knights vs. (3) Dallas Stars ====
This was the first playoff series between these two teams. Vegas won their round-robin game between these two teams earlier in this year's playoffs 5–3. This was Vegas' second appearance in the conference finals. Their only previous conference finals was in 2018, which they won against the Winnipeg Jets in five games. This was Dallas's ninth semifinal/conference final appearance since the league began using a 16-team or greater playoff format in 1980. They last went to the conference finals in 2008, which they lost to the Detroit Red Wings in six games. These teams split their two games in this year's regular season series.

The Stars defeated the Golden Knights in five games. Anton Khudobin made 25 saves and John Klingberg scored the only goal of game one for the Stars, shutting out Vegas 1–0. Robin Lehner posted his own shutout in game two, stopping all 24 shots in the Golden Knights' 3–0 victory. In game three, Alexander Radulov gave the Stars a 2–1 series lead after his goal 31 seconds into overtime ensured Dallas a 3–2 victory. Khudobin made 32 saves in game four, leading the Stars to a 2–1 win. In game five, the Stars came back from a 2–0 deficit in the third period to force overtime and at 3:36 of the first overtime, Denis Gurianov scored to send the Stars to the Stanley Cup Final for the first time in 20 years with a 3–2 victory.

September 6	Dallas Stars	1–0	Vegas Golden Knights	Rogers Place	Recap
John Klingberg (3) – 02:36		First period	No scoring
No scoring		Second period	No scoring
No scoring		Third period	No scoring
Anton Khudobin 25 saves / 25 shots		Goalie stats	Marc-Andre Fleury 24 saves / 25 shots

September 8	Dallas Stars	0–3	Vegas Golden Knights	Rogers Place	Recap
No scoring		First period	No scoring
No scoring		Second period	04:53 – Paul Stastny (3); 08:24 – pp – William Karlsson (4); 14:32 – Tomas Nosek (2)
No scoring		Third period	No scoring
Anton Khudobin 24 saves / 27 shots Jake Oettinger 5 saves / 5 shots		Goalie stats	Robin Lehner 24 saves / 24 shots

September 10	Vegas Golden Knights	2–3	OT	Dallas Stars	Rogers Place	Recap
No scoring		First period		No scoring
No scoring		Second period		19:43 – Jamie Oleksiak (4)
Shea Theodore (7) – pp – 03:49; Mark Stone (7) – 12:46		Third period		07:35 – Jamie Benn (6)
No scoring		First overtime period		00:31 – Alexander Radulov (8)
Robin Lehner 20 saves / 23 shots		Goalie stats		Anton Khudobin 38 saves / 40 shots

September 12	Vegas Golden Knights	1–2	Dallas Stars	Rogers Place	Recap
No scoring		First period	No scoring
Alec Martinez (2) – pp – 07:44		Second period	11:34 – Joe Pavelski (9); 19:01 – pp – Jamie Benn (7)
No scoring		Third period	No scoring
Robin Lehner 18 saves / 20 shots		Goalie stats	Anton Khudobin 32 saves / 33 shots

September 14	Dallas Stars	3–2	OT	Vegas Golden Knights	Rogers Place	Recap
No scoring		First period		08:14 – Chandler Stephenson (3)
No scoring		Second period		No scoring
Jamie Benn (8) – 09:54; Joel Kiviranta (4) – pp – 16:13		Third period		00:15 – Reilly Smith (5)
Denis Gurianov (9) – pp – 03:36		First overtime period		No scoring
Anton Khudobin 34 saves / 36 shots		Goalie stats		Robin Lehner 23 saves / 26 shots

Dallas won series 4–1

== Stanley Cup Final ==
This was the first playoff meeting between these two teams. Tampa Bay made their third Finals appearance. They last went to the Final in 2015, which they lost to the Chicago Blackhawks in six games. Dallas made their fifth appearance in the Finals. They last went to the Final in 2000, which they lost to the New Jersey Devils in six games. Dallas won both games in this year's regular season series.

September 19	Dallas Stars	4–1	Tampa Bay Lightning	Rogers Place	Recap
Joel Hanley (1) – 05:40		First period	12:32 – Yanni Gourde (6)
Jamie Oleksiak (5) – 12:30; Joel Kiviranta (5) – 19:32		Second period	No scoring
Jason Dickinson (1) – en – 18:42		Third period	No scoring
Anton Khudobin 35 saves / 36 shots		Goalie stats	Andrei Vasilevskiy 16 saves / 19 shots

September 21	Dallas Stars	2–3	Tampa Bay Lightning	Rogers Place	Recap
No scoring		First period	11:23 – pp – Brayden Point (10); 14:22 – pp – Ondrej Palat (9); 15:16 – Kevin Shattenkirk (2)
Joe Pavelski (10) – pp – 14:43		Second period	No scoring
Mattias Janmark (1) – 05:27		Third period	No scoring
Anton Khudobin 28 saves / 31 shots		Goalie stats	Andrei Vasilevskiy 27 saves / 29 shots

September 23	Tampa Bay Lightning	5–2	Dallas Stars	Rogers Place	Recap
Nikita Kucherov (7) – 05:33; Steven Stamkos (1) – 06:58		First period	11:19 – sh – Jason Dickinson (2)
Victor Hedman (10) – pp – 00:54; Brayden Point (11) – 12:02; Ondrej Palat (10) – 18:55		Second period	No scoring
No scoring		Third period	06:49 – Miro Heiskanen (6)
Andrei Vasilevskiy 22 saves / 24 shots		Goalie stats	Anton Khudobin 24 saves / 29 shots Jake Oettinger 3 saves / 3 shots

September 25	Tampa Bay Lightning	5–4	OT	Dallas Stars	Rogers Place	Recap
Brayden Point (12) – 19:27		First period		07:17 – John Klingberg (4); 18:28 – Joe Pavelski (11)
Brayden Point (13) – pp – 02:08; Yanni Gourde (7) – pp – 18:54		Second period		08:26 – Corey Perry (3)
Alex Killorn (5) – 06:41		Third period		11:35 – Joe Pavelski (12)
Kevin Shattenkirk (3) – pp – 06:34		First overtime period		No scoring
Andrei Vasilevskiy 26 saves / 30 shots		Goalie stats		Anton Khudobin 30 saves / 35 shots

September 26	Dallas Stars	3–2	2OT	Tampa Bay Lightning	Rogers Place	Recap
Corey Perry (4) – 17:52		First period		No scoring
No scoring		Second period		04:37 – Ondrej Palat (11)
Joe Pavelski (13) – 13:15		Third period		03:38 – Mikhail Sergachev (3)
Corey Perry (5) – 09:23		Second overtime period		No scoring
Anton Khudobin 39 saves / 41 shots		Goalie stats		Andrei Vasilevskiy 30 saves / 33 shots

September 28	Tampa Bay Lightning	2–0	Dallas Stars	Rogers Place	Recap
Brayden Point (14) – pp – 12:23		First period	No scoring
Blake Coleman (5) – 07:01		Second period	No scoring
No scoring		Third period	No scoring
Andrei Vasilevskiy 22 saves / 22 shots		Goalie stats	Anton Khudobin 27 saves / 29 shots

Tampa Bay won series 4–2

== Player statistics ==
=== Skaters ===
These are the top ten skaters based on points, following the conclusion of the playoffs.

Player	Team	GP	G	A	Pts	+/–	PIM
Nikita Kucherov	Tampa Bay Lightning	25	7	27	34	+15	22
Brayden Point	Tampa Bay Lightning	23	14	19	33	+12	10
Miro Heiskanen	Dallas Stars	27	6	20	26	+8	2
Nathan MacKinnon	Colorado Avalanche	15	9	16	25	+13	12
Victor Hedman	Tampa Bay Lightning	25	10	12	22	+13	24
Mikko Rantanen	Colorado Avalanche	15	7	14	21	+11	6
John Klingberg	Dallas Stars	26	4	17	21	–5	14
Josh Bailey	New York Islanders	22	2	18	20	+8	0
Joe Pavelski	Dallas Stars	27	13	6	19	+6	30
Jamie Benn	Dallas Stars	27	8	11	19	+2	32

=== Goaltenders ===
This is a combined table of the top five goaltenders based on goals against average and the top five goaltenders based on save percentage, with at least 420 minutes played. The table is sorted by GAA, and the criteria for inclusion are bolded.

Player	Team	GP	W	L	SA	GA	GAA	SV%	SO	TOI
Carey Price	Montreal Canadiens	10	5	5	282	18	**1.78**	**.936**	2	605:32
Joonas Korpisalo	Columbus Blue Jackets	9	3	5	320	19	**1.90**	**.941**	2	599:00
Andrei Vasilevskiy	Tampa Bay Lightning	25	18	7	740	54	**1.90**	**.927**	1	1,708:12
Robin Lehner	Vegas Golden Knights	16	9	7	386	32	**1.99**	.917	4	965:52
Semyon Varlamov	New York Islanders	20	11	7	559	44	**2.14**	.921	2	1,232:44
Carter Hart	Philadelphia Flyers	14	9	5	431	32	2.23	**.926**	2	859:38
Cam Talbot	Calgary Flames	10	5	4	316	24	2.42	**.924**	2	595:33

== Activism ==
On August 26, 2020, various professional athletes in the U.S began to go on strike from their respective sports contests in response to the August 23 police shooting of Jacob Blake in Kenosha, Wisconsin, and the protests which followed. These strikes began with the Milwaukee Bucks of the National Basketball Association (NBA). Other players in the NBA, Major League Baseball, Major League Soccer and Women's National Basketball Association soon followed suit and also decided not to play their August 26 games.

When these cancellations south of the border began, NHL players were still isolated in the Edmonton and Toronto bubbles, with game two of the Islanders–Flyers series already in progress when the Bucks first announced their decision to not play. The NHL then continued to play the remaining August 26 games, as NHL players did not take a strong stand for the rest of the day. After pressure brought by the postponement of games by the other leagues, and discussions by players of the Hockey Diversity Alliance such as Evander Kane and Mathew Dumba, the NHLPA announced that they would not play their games on August 27 and August 28. The affected games involved all eight teams remaining: game three between the Flyers and Islanders, game three between the Golden Knights and Canucks, game four between the Lightning and Bruins, and game four between the Avalanche and Stars. The NHL fully supported their decision to postpone the games. On September 1, Dallas Stars president Brad Alberts reported that his team had lost some corporate and personal season ticket holders as a result of the protest.

== Media ==
=== Canada ===
This marked the sixth postseason under Rogers Media's 12-year contract. Games aired across Sportsnet, SN1, SN360, FX, and CBC under the Hockey Night in Canada brand. Games were also streamed on Sportsnet Now, CBCSports.ca (for games televised by CBC), or the subscription service Rogers NHL Live.

=== United States ===
This marked the ninth postseason under NBC Sports' current 10-year contract for American rights. All national coverage of games were aired on either NBCSN, the NBC broadcast network, CNBC, NHL Network, or USA Network. During the round-robins, qualifying round, and first round, excluding games exclusively broadcast on NBC, the regional rightsholders of each participating U.S. team produced local telecasts of their respective games.

=== Impact on production ===
Only technical staff such as cameramen and producers were present inside the "bubble". A clean host feed was then sent to media partners to add commentary and surrounding coverage, and interviews with players had to be conducted via videoconferencing. NBC Sports's technical staff worked on the Toronto broadcasts, while Sportsnet's technical staff did the same with the Edmonton broadcasts. Steve Simmons of the Toronto Sun reported that Canadian freelance broadcast workers were upset that NBC personnel were being allowed into Canada to work in Toronto instead of them. The NHL's EVP of communications Gary Meagher stated that splitting production in this manner had been intended "from the onset". Premier of Ontario Doug Ford admitted that plans of NBC's involvement were not part of the early negotiations with the league.

Commentators called the games remotely off of monitors from either their respective studios or from their home arena press boxes. This same arrangement was also done for the radio networks of every team. While it was initially stated that all commentators would broadcast remotely, the league eventually allowed a handful of both Sportsnet and NBC commentators and reporters into the hubs to call select games. Chris Cuthbert, who jumped from TSN to Sportsnet during the break in June, and Louie DeBrusk were on-site in Edmonton; and Jim Hughson and Craig Simpson were on-site in Toronto during the qualifying, first, and second rounds; they later moved to the Edmonton hub. For NBC, John Forslund, Mike Milbury, and Brian Boucher were initially sent to Toronto; and Pierre McGuire to Edmonton. Milbury was later removed from commentary for the remainder of NBC Sports' coverage after making insensitive comments following the fifth game of the Islanders–Capitals first round series. Gord Miller later joined Forslund, Milbury, and Boucher at the Toronto bubble and alternated with Forslund on a handful of broadcasts. Most of NBC's other commentators began working games remotely from NBC Sports' studios in Stamford, Connecticut, with NBC planning for "the majority of calls" to eventually be conducted on-site, including the last two rounds of the playoffs in Edmonton. Kenny Albert, who worked for both NBC and the New York Rangers radio broadcasts, traveled to the Edmonton bubble after the Rangers were eliminated in the qualifying round. Albert called play-by-play of every game of the Western Conference second round and the first three games of the Western Conference finals before leaving the Edmonton bubble to join the NFL on Fox broadcast team. Forslund, Boucher, and Eddie Olczyk later flew to the Edmonton bubble to call the conference finals. In the case of NBC lead play-by-play commentator Mike "Doc" Emrick, he was working games from his home studio in Metro Detroit because he is a cancer survivor over the age of 70, and therefore at increased risk of severe illness from COVID-19.

Additional cameras were used to provide new angles not usually possible when a crowd is present, and de-emphasize views of the arenas' stands. The telecasts used simulated crowd noise provided by Electronic Arts, combined with recordings of team-specific chants by season ticketholders of participating teams (the latter of which were also be played in-arena). All games carried a five second broadcast delay in order to censor offensive language.

=== Viewership ===
Average U.S. viewership of the playoff rounds were down by 28% compared to 2019, the lowest to-date over the course of NBC's current broadcast rights contract. Amid expanded competition due to the difference in scheduling, game one of the Stanley Cup Final was seen by only 2.12 million viewers; with an average of 2.15 million across the entire series, it was the least-watched Stanley Cup Final since 2007, and down 61% over 2019. Airing opposite a Monday Night Football contest between the Kansas City Chiefs and Baltimore Ravens, Game six was seen by 2.88 million viewers, the least-watched series-clinching game since at least 2000.

Preceded by 2019 Stanley Cup playoffs	Stanley Cup playoffs 2020	Succeeded by 2021 Stanley Cup playoffs
