= Denis Gurianov =

Russian ice hockey player (born 1997)

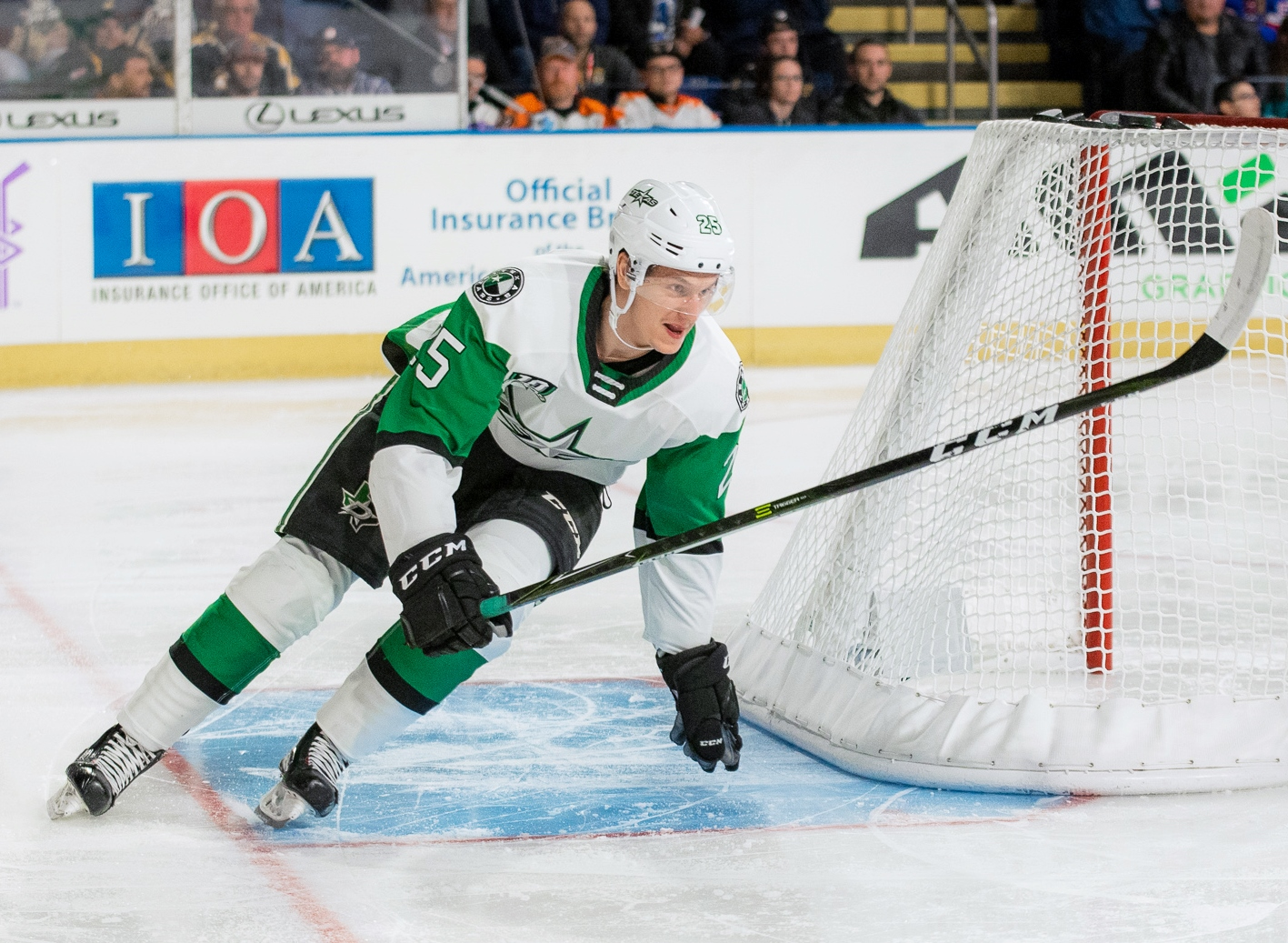
- Gurianov with the Texas Stars in 2019
- Born: 7 June 1997 (age 29) Togliatti, Russia
- Height: 6 ft 3 in (191 cm)
- Weight: 205 lb (93 kg; 14 st 9 lb)
- Position: Right wing
- Shoots: Left
- KHL team Former teams: CSKA Moscow; Lada Togliatti; Dallas Stars; Montreal Canadiens; Nashville Predators; Philadelphia Flyers
- NHL draft: 12th overall, 2015; Dallas Stars
- Playing career: 2014–present

Denis Vladimirovich Gurianov (Russian: Денис Владимирович Гурьянов; born 7 June 1997) is a Russian professional ice hockey winger for HC CSKA Moscow of the Kontinental Hockey League (KHL). He was selected in the first round, 12th overall, by the Dallas Stars in the 2015 NHL entry draft. Gurianov has previously played in the National Hockey League (NHL) for the Montreal Canadiens, Nashville Predators and Philadelphia Flyers.

== Playing career ==
Gurianov was drafted 42nd overall by Lada Togliatti in the 2014 KHL Draft. In just his second season within the HC Lada Togliatti organization, Gurianov was recalled from the Minor Hockey League to make his professional debut in the 2014–15 KHL season. On 4 September 2014, he appeared in his first KHL contest as a 17-year-old in a 5–2 defeat to HC Ugra. He would dress in 8 games over the campaign recording 1 assist. He was included among the top prospects European rankings approaching the 2015 NHL entry draft and was selected 12th overall by the Dallas Stars in the Draft.

On 12 May 2016, Gurianov terminated his contract with Lada Togiliatti and signed a three-year entry-level contract with the Dallas Stars of the National Hockey League. He was assigned to the Texas Stars of the American Hockey League for the 2016–17 AHL season. Gurianov made his NHL debut on 8 April 2017, against the Colorado Avalanche.

After attending the Stars training camp and development camp, Gurianov was assigned to the Texas Stars to begin the 2018–19 AHL season. On 7 November, Gurianov was recalled to the NHL. He recorded his first career NHL goal on 10 November from a redirect of Ben Gleason's shot in the third period to give the Stars a one goal lead over the Nashville Predators. The Stars would lose the game to the Predators in overtime, 5–4. He was reassigned the next day to the Texas Stars. On 20 August 2020, Gurianov scored four goals in the Stars' 7–3 win over the Calgary Flames to advance to the second round of the 2020 Stanley Cup playoffs. He is the first player in Stars history to score four goals in one playoff game. On 14 September 2020, Gurianov scored the overtime winner against the Vegas Golden Knights in game five of the Western Conference Finals, sending Dallas to the 2020 Stanley Cup Finals for the first time since 2000.

On 22 October 2020, Gurianov signed a two-year, $5.1 million contract with the Stars.

On 7 June 2022, he signed a one-year contract extension with the team. In the following 2022–23 season, Gurianov was unable to replicate his previous offensive contributions despite the Stars leading the Western Conference, posting two goals and nine points in 43 regular season games. On 26 February 2023, Gurianov was traded by the Stars to the Montreal Canadiens in exchange for fellow Russian, Evgenii Dadonov. Gurianov improved his goal scoring output with the Canadiens ending the season with five goals and three assists for eight points through 23 games.

On 30 June 2023, Gurianov was not tendered a qualifying offer by the Canadiens, releasing him as a free agent. On 11 July, Gurianov signed a one-year contract with the Nashville Predators. During the 2023–24 season, having made just 14 appearances with the Predators, on 8 March 2024, the Predators traded Gurianov to the Philadelphia Flyers in exchange for Wade Allison.

On 1 August 2024, as a free agent from his brief tenure with the Flyers, Gurianov opted to return to his homeland to continue his career, signing a two-year contract with CSKA Moscow of the KHL.

== Career statistics ==
=== Regular season and playoffs ===
			Regular season					Playoffs
Season	Team	League	GP	G	A	Pts	PIM	GP	G	A	Pts	PIM
2013–14	Lada Togliatti	MHL	37	7	9	16	6	—	—	—	—	—
2014–15	Lada Togliatti	MHL	23	15	10	25	39	4	3	1	4	12
2014–15	Lada Togliatti	KHL	8	0	1	1	2	—	—	—	—	—
2015–16	Lada Togliatti	MHL	7	4	2	6	4	—	—	—	—	—
2015–16	Lada Togliatti	KHL	47	4	1	5	6	—	—	—	—	—
2016–17	Texas Stars	AHL	57	12	15	27	17	—	—	—	—	—
2016–17	Dallas Stars	NHL	1	0	0	0	0	—	—	—	—	—
2017–18	Texas Stars	AHL	74	19	15	34	11	16	2	3	5	0
2018–19	Texas Stars	AHL	57	20	28	48	12	—	—	—	—	—
2018–19	Dallas Stars	NHL	21	1	3	4	0	—	—	—	—	—
2019–20	Dallas Stars	NHL	64	20	9	29	13	27	9	8	17	2
2019–20	Texas Stars	AHL	2	3	0	3	0	—	—	—	—	—
2020–21	Dallas Stars	NHL	55	12	18	30	21	—	—	—	—	—
2021–22	Dallas Stars	NHL	73	11	20	31	16	5	0	0	0	0
2022–23	Dallas Stars	NHL	43	2	7	9	4	—	—	—	—	—
2022–23	Montreal Canadiens	NHL	23	5	3	8	6	—	—	—	—	—
2023–24	Milwaukee Admirals	AHL	27	12	18	30	8	—	—	—	—	—
2023–24	Nashville Predators	NHL	14	1	1	2	0	—	—	—	—	—
2023–24	Philadelphia Flyers	NHL	4	0	0	0	0	—	—	—	—	—
2024–25	CSKA Moscow	KHL	62	22	14	36	15	6	0	1	1	4
2025–26	CSKA Moscow	KHL	56	15	7	22	17	10	6	1	7	2
KHL totals			173	41	23	64	40	16	6	2	8	6
NHL totals			298	52	61	113	60	32	9	8	17	2

=== International ===
Year	Team	Event	Result	GP	G	A	Pts	PIM
2014	Russia	U17	3rd place, bronze medalist(s)	6	3	2	5	2
2015	Russia	U18	5th	6	3	2	5	2
2017	Russia	WJC	3rd place, bronze medalist(s)	7	4	3	7	2
Junior totals				19	10	7	17	6

Awards and achievements
Preceded by Julius Honka	Dallas Stars first-round draft pick 2015	Succeeded by Riley Tufte
