= Ben Gleason =

American ice hockey player (born 1998)

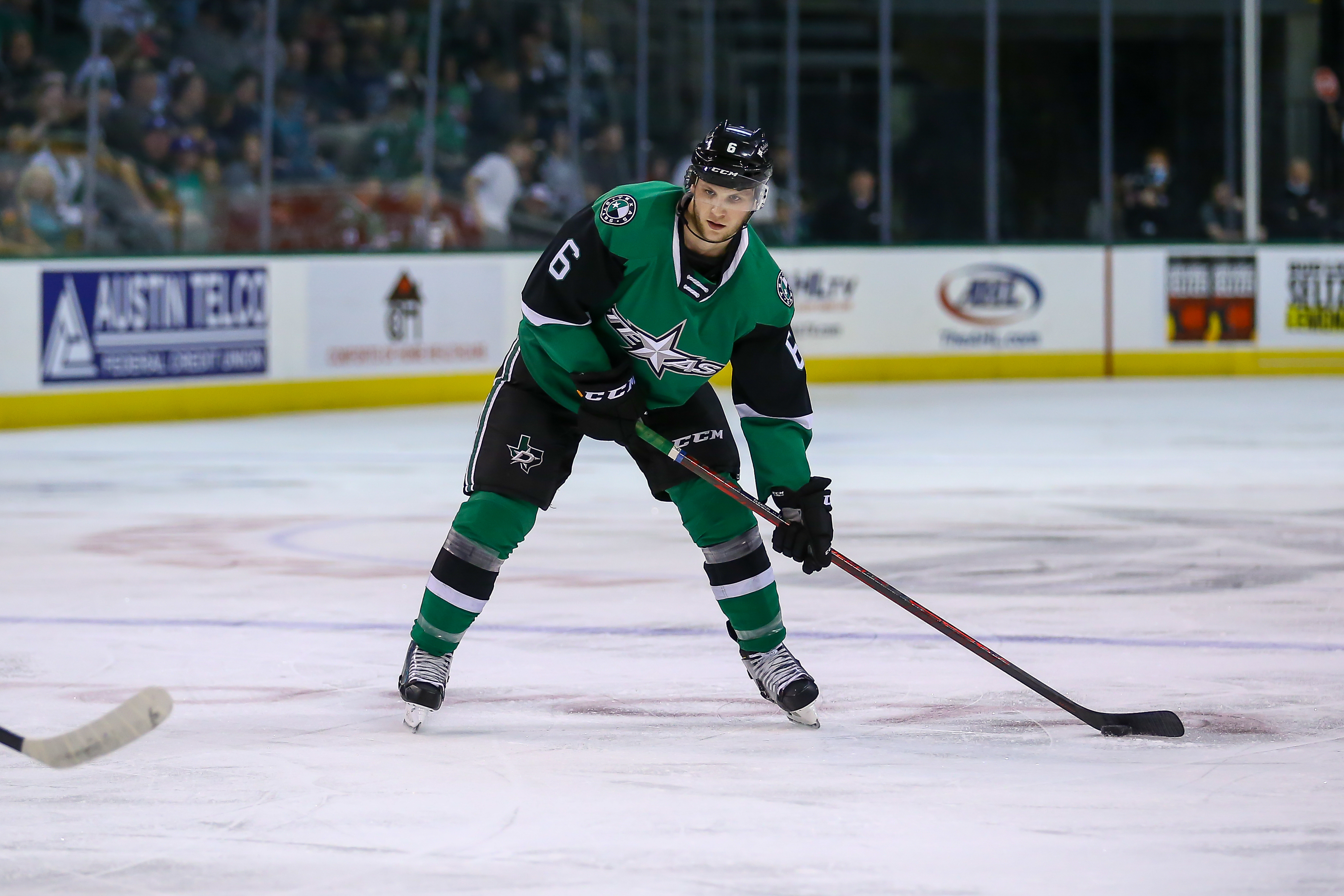
- Gleason with the Texas Stars in 2022
- Born: March 25, 1998 (age 28) Ortonville, Michigan, U.S.
- Height: 6 ft 1 in (185 cm)
- Weight: 190 lb (86 kg; 13 st 8 lb)
- Position: Defense
- Shoots: Left
- AHL team Former teams: Texas Stars; Dallas Stars
- NHL draft: Undrafted
- Playing career: 2018–present

Benjamin Gleason (born March 25, 1998) is an American professional ice hockey defenseman who is currently playing with the Texas Stars of the American Hockey League (AHL).

== Playing career ==
=== Major junior ===
Gleason was drafted in the second round, 36th overall, by the London Knights in the 2014 Ontario Hockey League (OHL) draft. In August 2015, Gleason was one of 11 OHL players selected for the USA Hockey All-American Prospects Game, a game compiled of the top U.S. NHL draft eligible players. However, on October 7, 2015, Gleason was traded to the Hamilton Bulldogs in exchange for a second round pick in the 2017 OHL Selection and a conditional 15th round pick in 2019. Despite his successful season, with 33 points in 66 games, Gleason was passed over in the 2016 NHL entry draft.

As an overage player during the 2017–18 season, Gleason helped lead the Bulldogs to their first Leyden Trophy as the regular season champion of the East division in the OHL.

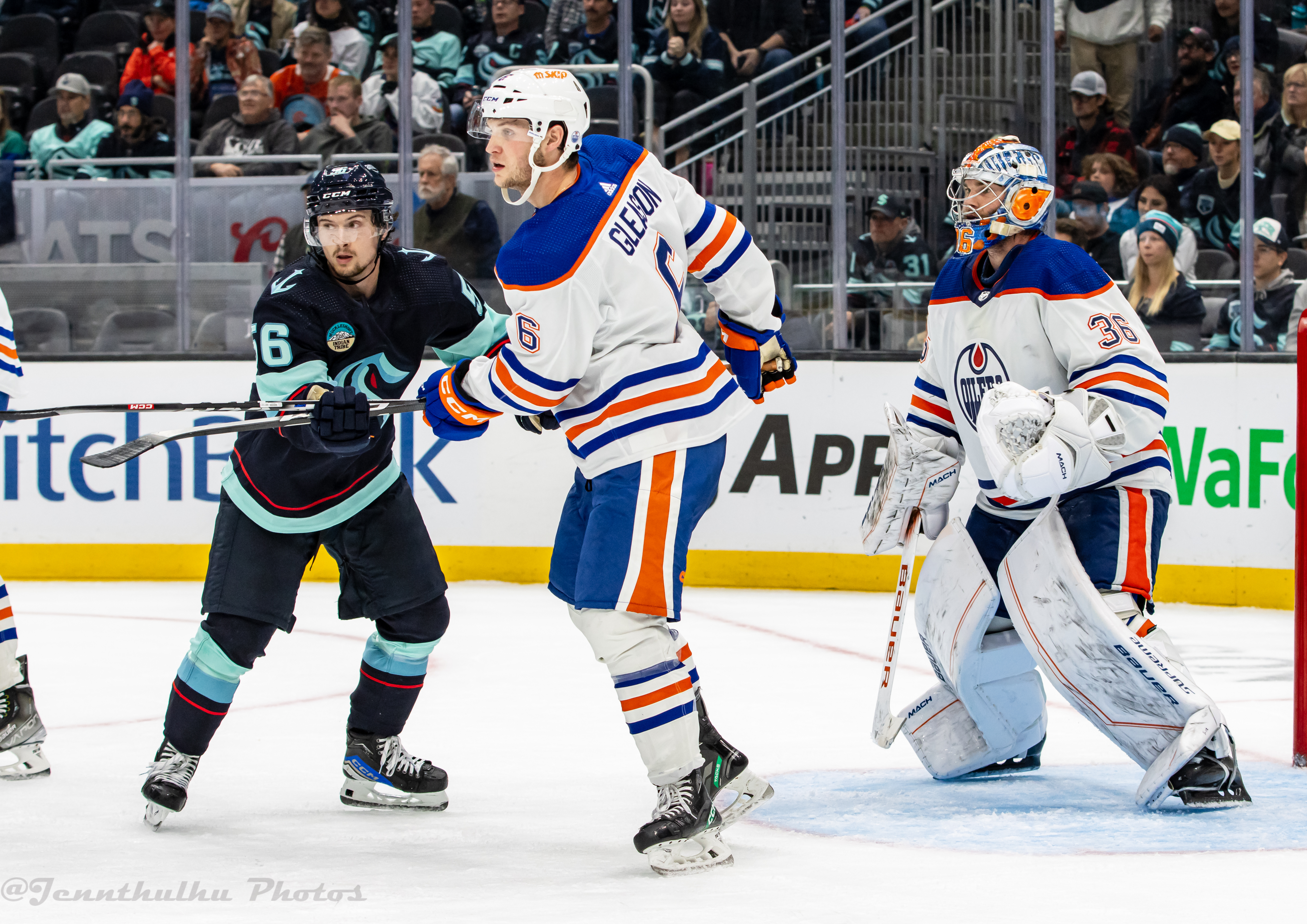
Gleason with the Edmonton Oilers battling for position against Kailer Yamamoto of the Seattle Kraken in 2023.

=== Professional ===
Undrafted in the NHL entry draft, Gleason signed a three-year entry-level contract with the Dallas Stars on September 13, 2018. After attending the Stars' training camp, he was assigned to the Texas Stars of the American Hockey League (AHL). Gleason was recalled to the NHL on November 10, where he recorded his first NHL point on an assist of Denis Gurianov's first NHL goal that night as the Stars lost the game in overtime to the Nashville Predators. On November 22, he was reassigned to the Texas Stars.

As a free agent from the Stars after five seasons within the organization, Gleason was signed to a two-year, $1.55 million contract with the Edmonton Oilers on July 2, 2023. Gleason impressed Oilers staff during the 2023–24 preseason and was considered a dark horse to make the final roster. In spite of this, Gleason was a late cut from their roster and was re-assigned to their AHL affiliate, the Bakersfield Condors, prior to the start of the season. He tallied two goals and seven assists for nine points through 14 games before being recalled to the NHL on December 7.

During the 2024–25 season, on November 4, 2024, Gleason was traded by the Oilers to the Philadelphia Flyers in exchange for Ronnie Attard.

He signed a one-year, two-way contract with the Minnesota Wild for the 2025–26 season on July 2, 2025.

As a free agent at the conclusion of his contract with the Wild, Gleason returned to the Dallas Stars organization at the commencement of the 2026–27 season, signing a one-year AHL contract with the Texas Stars on September 23, 2026.

== Personal life ==
Gleason comes from an ice hockey playing family. He is the cousin of former NHL player Tim Gleason and Central Michigan University player James Gleason. His other cousin, Jacob, played with the Metro Jets in the United States Premier Hockey League (USPHL).

== Career statistics ==
=== Regular season and playoffs ===
			Regular season					Playoffs
Season	Team	League	GP	G	A	Pts	PIM	GP	G	A	Pts	PIM
2014–15	London Knights	OHL	41	0	5	5	16	—	—	—	—	—
2015–16	London Knights	OHL	2	0	1	1	0	—	—	—	—	—
2015–16	Hamilton Bulldogs	OHL	64	7	25	32	44	—	—	—	—	—
2016–17	Hamilton Bulldogs	OHL	66	6	33	39	37	7	0	2	2	6
2017–18	Hamilton Bulldogs	OHL	63	9	39	48	43	21	3	15	18	12
2018–19	Texas Stars	AHL	72	5	32	37	34	—	—	—	—	—
2018–19	Dallas Stars	NHL	4	0	1	1	0	—	—	—	—	—
2019–20	Texas Stars	AHL	43	2	8	10	37	—	—	—	—	—
2020–21	Texas Stars	AHL	37	4	13	17	20	—	—	—	—	—
2021–22	Texas Stars	AHL	70	9	35	44	57	2	0	0	0	0
2022–23	Texas Stars	AHL	68	9	24	33	40	8	1	4	5	2
2023–24	Bakersfield Condors	AHL	62	10	22	32	32	2	0	0	0	6
2024–25	Bakersfield Condors	AHL	7	1	3	4	9	—	—	—	—	—
2024–25	Lehigh Valley Phantoms	AHL	29	2	12	14	7	—	—	—	—	—
2025–26	Iowa Wild	AHL	59	2	20	22	23	—	—	—	—	—
NHL totals			4	0	1	1	0	—	—	—	—	—

=== International ===
Year	Team	Event	Result	GP	G	A	Pts	PIM
2015	United States	IH18	5th	4	0	1	1	6
Junior totals				4	0	1	1	6
