= 2018–19 Ottawa Senators season =

Season of professional ice hockey team

2018–19 Ottawa Senators
- Division: 8th Atlantic
- Conference: 16th Eastern
- 2018–19 record: 29–47–6
- Home record: 18–19–4
- Road record: 11–28–2
- Goals for: 242
- Goals against: 302

Team information
- General manager: Pierre Dorion
- Coach: Guy Boucher (Oct. 4 – Mar. 1); Marc Crawford (interim, Mar. 1 – April 6)
- Captain: Vacant
- Alternate captains: Mark Borowiecki; Matt Duchene (Oct. 4 – Feb. 22); Jean-Gabriel Pageau (Feb. 22 – Apr. 6); Zack Smith; Mark Stone (Oct. 4 – Feb. 25)
- Arena: Canadian Tire Centre
- Average attendance: 14,553
- Minor league affiliates: Belleville Senators (AHL); Brampton Beast (ECHL)

Team leaders
- Goals: Mark Stone (28)
- Assists: Thomas Chabot (41)
- Points: Mark Stone (62)
- Penalty minutes: Mark Borowiecki (89)
- Plus/minus: Mark Stone (+13)
- Wins: Craig Anderson (17)
- Goals against average: Anders Nilsson (2.90)

The 2018–19 Ottawa Senators season was the 27th season of the Ottawa Senators of the National Hockey League (NHL). The Senators failed to qualify for the playoffs for the second consecutive year, and finished last in the league with 64 points. The season saw the trading away of several notable veterans including Erik Karlsson, Matt Duchene, Mark Stone and Ryan Dzingel and the firing of coach Guy Boucher.

== Team business ==
In May 2018, the club announced the appointment of Nicolas Ruszkowski as its new chief operating officer. Ruszkowski has a background in public relations. Ruszkowski will be in charge of business operations and will not have a role in hockey operations.

Assistant general manager Randy Lee was suspended by the club in June, after being charged for offences during the NHL Entry Draft Combine in Buffalo, New York. He resigned from the position in August.

The Belleville Senators head coaching vacancy was filled in June when the Senators announced the hiring of Troy Mann, a veteran of ten seasons in the North American minor leagues.

The Senators named a new assistant general manager on September 17. The new assistant general manager is Peter MacTavish, who was previously with law firm Norton Rose Fulbright Canada LLP, and CAA Hockey.

The Senators announced that the Brampton Beast will be the team's official ECHL affiliate after the Montreal Canadiens decided not to renew their affiliation with the Beast.

The Senators' plans to build a new arena downtown in partnership with Trinity Developments came apart after it was revealed that the Senators were suing Trinity for CA$700 million in damages. Trinity was developing a site adjacent to the LeBreton Flats site and the Senators felt this was inappropriate competition. Trinity responded with a CA$1 billion dollar lawsuit, accusing the Senators of being unwilling to contribute any money to the project. The National Capital Commission (NCC), in charge of the public lands the arena would be situated on, announced the cancellation of the partnership's bid to develop the site, but gave the sides an extension when the two parties agreed to mediation. On February 27, 2019, it was announced that mediation between the parties had failed to come to an agreement and that the NCC would explore other options for the site's redevelopment.

== Off-season ==
In July, the Senators avoided arbitration with winger Mark Stone coming to agreement on a $7.3 million one-year contract. Contract negotiations with defenseman Cody Ceci went to arbitration, where he was awarded a $4.3 million one-year deal.

In August, the Senators' 2018 first-round pick Brady Tkachuk decided to forego further seasons in university to turn professional with the Senators, signing a three-year entry-level contract. The Senators hired former player Chris Kelly as a development coach on September 4, 2018. He joins former player Shean Donovan as development coach.

A contract extension was offered to captain Erik Karlsson on July 1, with no terms disclosed publicly. Karlsson turned down the offer, prompting media speculation about his status. The media reported that Karlsson was free to negotiate terms with other teams, however, no trade was made at the time. Trade speculation heated up as the team neared training camp, and the team finally made a deal with the San Jose Sharks on September 13, one day before training camp. The team received two NHL players (Dylan DeMelo, Chris Tierney), two young prospects (Josh Norris and Rudolfs Balcers), and first-round and second-round draft picks in exchange for Karlsson. Karlsson did not agree to a contract extension with the Sharks, and a second-round draft pick of the Sharks will go to the Senators should he re-sign with San Jose. An additional pick will go to the Senators should the Sharks trade Karlsson to the Eastern Conference.

== Pre-season ==
The Senators played in the Kraft Hockeyville game again in pre-season, playing the Toronto Maple Leafs in Lucan, Ontario on September 18. The team played a six-game pre-season schedule, including two against Toronto, two against Montreal and two against Chicago.

== Regular season ==
The Senators' first game of the season, also the home opener, was on October 4, 2018, versus the Chicago Blackhawks. In the team's 26 seasons of play, this was the first time the Blackhawks were the opening night opponent.

During November, a video leaked of seven Senators players, including Matt Duchene, Chris Wideman, Chris Tierney, Dylan DeMelo and Thomas Chabot, mocking the team during an Uber ride from a game. The five-minute video featured the players laughing at the team's low ranked penalty kill, poor special teams and insulting assistant coach Martin Raymond, who was not present in the vehicle. The video quickly went viral, and started a dialogue about privacy and consent about recording conversations. The players involved issued apologies for their comments.

At the trade deadline, the Senators traded away their top three scorers: Mark Stone, Matt Duchene and Ryan Dzingel; all were scheduled to become unrestricted free agents in July and had not agreed to contract extensions. Duchene and Dzingel were traded away to the Columbus Blue Jackets, and Stone was traded to the Vegas Golden Knights. At the trade deadline, the Senators were in last place in the NHL, a position they would hold for the rest of the season.

On March 1, 2019, head coach Guy Boucher was fired and associate coach Marc Crawford was named as interim head coach.

== Playoffs ==
The Senators failed to qualify for the 2019 Stanley Cup playoffs after being eliminated on March 9, 2019, following a 3–2 loss to the Boston Bruins.

== Standings ==
Atlantic Division
Pos	Team	GP	W	L	OTL	ROW	GF	GA	GD	Pts
1	p – Tampa Bay Lightning	82	62	16	4	56	325	222	+103	128
2	x – Boston Bruins	82	49	24	9	47	259	215	+44	107
3	x – Toronto Maple Leafs	82	46	28	8	46	286	251	+35	100
4	Montreal Canadiens	82	44	30	8	41	249	236	+13	96
5	Florida Panthers	82	36	32	14	33	267	280	−13	86
6	Buffalo Sabres	82	33	39	10	28	226	271	−45	76
7	Detroit Red Wings	82	32	40	10	29	227	277	−50	74
8	Ottawa Senators	82	29	47	6	29	242	302	−60	64

Source: National Hockey League
p – Clinched Presidents' Trophy; x – Clinched playoff spot

Eastern Conference Wild Card
Pos	Div	Team	GP	W	L	OTL	ROW	GF	GA	GD	Pts
1	ME	x – Carolina Hurricanes	82	46	29	7	44	245	223	+22	99
2	ME	x – Columbus Blue Jackets	82	47	31	4	45	258	232	+26	98
3	AT	Montreal Canadiens	82	44	30	8	41	249	236	+13	96
4	AT	Florida Panthers	82	36	32	14	33	267	280	−13	86
5	ME	Philadelphia Flyers	82	37	37	8	34	244	281	−37	82
6	ME	New York Rangers	82	32	36	14	26	227	272	−45	78
7	AT	Buffalo Sabres	82	33	39	10	28	226	271	−45	76
8	AT	Detroit Red Wings	82	32	40	10	29	227	277	−50	74
9	ME	New Jersey Devils	82	31	41	10	28	222	275	−53	72
10	AT	Ottawa Senators	82	29	47	6	29	242	302	−60	64

Source: National Hockey League
x – Clinched playoff spot

== Schedule and results ==
=== Pre-season ===
The pre-season schedule was published on June 18, 2018.

2018 pre-season game log: 2–4–0 (Home: 1–2–0; Road: 1–2–0)
#	Date	Visitor	Score	Home	OT	Decision	Attendance	Record	Recap
1^{[a]}	September 18	Ottawa	1–4	Toronto		Condon	–	0–1–0
2	September 19	Toronto	4–1	Ottawa		McKenna	11,375	0–2–0
3	September 21	Chicago	5–2	Ottawa		Gustavsson	7,891	0–3–0
4	September 22	Ottawa	2–3	Montreal		Anderson	20,405	0–4–0
5	September 27	Ottawa	2–1	Chicago		Condon	20,239	1–4–0
6	September 29	Montreal	0–3	Ottawa		Anderson	14,398	2–4–0
Notes:^{a} Game was played at Lucan Community Memorial Centre in Lucan, Ontario.

=== Regular season ===
The regular season schedule was released on June 21, 2018.

2018–19 game log (Record: 29–47–6; Home: 18–19–4; Road: 11–28–2)

October: 4–5–2 (Home: 3–2–1; Road: 1–3–1)
#	Date	Visitor	Score	Home	OT	Decision	Attendance	Record	Pts	Recap
1	October 4	Chicago	4–3	Ottawa	OT	Anderson	15,858	0–0–1	1
2	October 6	Ottawa	5–3	Toronto		Anderson	19,321	1–0–1	3
3	October 8	Ottawa	3–6	Boston		Condon	17,565	1–1–1	3
4	October 10	Philadelphia	7–4	Ottawa		Anderson	13,215	1–2–1	3
5	October 13	Los Angeles	1–5	Ottawa		Anderson	15,355	2–2–1	5
6	October 15	Dallas	1–4	Ottawa		Anderson	12,358	3–2–1	7
7	October 20	Montreal	3–4	Ottawa	OT	Anderson	18,442	4–2–1	9
8	October 23	Boston	4–1	Ottawa		Anderson	15,265	4–3–1	9
9	October 26	Ottawa	3–6	Colorado		Anderson	16,851	4–4–1	9
10	October 28	Ottawa	3–4	Vegas	OT	Anderson	18,089	4–4–2	10
11	October 30	Ottawa	1–5	Arizona		Condon	13,988	4–5–2	10

November: 7–7–1 (Home: 5–2–1; Road: 2–5–0)
#	Date	Visitor	Score	Home	OT	Decision	Attendance	Record	Pts	Recap
12	November 1	Buffalo	2–4	Ottawa		Anderson	12,587	5–5–2	12
13	November 3	Ottawa	2–9	Buffalo		Anderson	17,881	5–6–2	12
14	November 4	Tampa Bay	4–3	Ottawa	OT	Anderson	11,364	5–6–3	13
15	November 6	New Jersey	3–7	Ottawa		Anderson	12,491	6–6–3	15
16	November 8	Vegas	5–3	Ottawa		Anderson	15,213	6–7–3	15
17	November 10	Ottawa	6–4	Tampa Bay		Anderson	19,092	7–7–3	17
18	November 11	Ottawa	1–5	Florida		McKenna	11,192	7–8–3	17
19	November 15	Detroit	1–2	Ottawa		Anderson	13,402	8–8–3	19
20	November 17	Pittsburgh	4–6	Ottawa		Anderson	17,692	9–8–3	21
21	November 19	Florida	7–5	Ottawa		Anderson	11,750	9–9–3	21
22	November 21	Ottawa	4–6	Minnesota		Anderson	19,035	9–10–3	21
23	November 23	Ottawa	4–6	Dallas		Anderson	18,532	9–11–3	21
24	November 26	Ottawa	2–4	NY Rangers		Anderson	16,709	9–12–3	21
25	November 27	Ottawa	4–3	Philadelphia		McKenna	19,083	10–12–3	23
26	November 29	NY Rangers	0–3	Ottawa		Anderson	10,921	11–12–3	25

December: 4–9–1 (Home: 3–3–1; Road: 1–6–0)
#	Date	Visitor	Score	Home	OT	Decision	Attendance	Record	Pts	Recap
27	December 1	San Jose	2–6	Ottawa		Anderson	17,531	12–12–3	27
28	December 4	Ottawa	2–5	Montreal		Anderson	20,705	12–13–3	27
29	December 6	Montreal	5–2	Ottawa		Anderson	15,820	12–14–3	27
30	December 8	Pittsburgh	1–2	Ottawa	OT	Anderson	15,795	13–14–3	29
31	December 9	Boston	2–1	Ottawa	OT	McKenna	13,148	13–14–4	30
32	December 11	Ottawa	1–3	Nashville		Anderson	17,162	13–15–4	30
33	December 14	Ottawa	4–2	Detroit		Anderson	18,330	14–15–4	32
34	December 15	Ottawa	2–5	Montreal		McKenna	21,302	14–16–4	32
35	December 17	Nashville	3–4	Ottawa	OT	Anderson	14,492	15–16–4	34
36	December 21	Ottawa	2–5	New Jersey		Anderson	14,614	15–17–4	34
37	December 22	Washington	4–0	Ottawa		McKenna	15,605	15–18–4	34
38	December 28	Ottawa	3–6	NY Islanders		McKenna	13,434	15–19–4	34
39	December 29	Washington	3–2	Ottawa		Hogberg	16,808	15–20–4	34
40	December 31	Ottawa	3–6	Columbus		Hogberg	18,549	15–21–4	34

January: 4–5–1 (Home: 1–3–1; Road: 3–2–0)
#	Date	Visitor	Score	Home	OT	Decision	Attendance	Record	Pts	Recap
41	January 2	Vancouver	4–3	Ottawa	OT	Hogberg	16,358	15–21–5	35
42	January 5	Minnesota	4–3	Ottawa		Nilsson	14,124	15–22–5	35
43	January 6	Carolina	5–4	Ottawa		Nilsson	12,924	15–23–5	35
44	January 9	Ottawa	2–1	Anaheim	OT	Nilsson	17,174	16–23–5	37
45	January 10	Ottawa	4–1	Los Angeles		Nilsson	17,713	17–23–5	39
46	January 12	Ottawa	1–4	San Jose		Nilsson	17,562	17–24–5	39
47	January 16	Colorado	2–5	Ottawa		Nilsson	14,468	18–24–5	41
48	January 18	Ottawa	4–1	Carolina		Nilsson	15,598	19–24–5	43
49	January 19	Ottawa	2–3	St. Louis		Anderson	17,690	19–25–5	43
50	January 22	Arizona	3–2	Ottawa		Anderson	12,236	19–26–5	43

February: 3–11–0 (Home: 2–5–0; Road: 1–6–0)
#	Date	Visitor	Score	Home	OT	Decision	Attendance	Record	Pts	Recap
51	February 1	Ottawa	3–5	Pittsburgh		Nilsson	18,618	19–27–5	43
52	February 2	Detroit	2–0	Ottawa		Anderson	15,714	19–28–5	43
53	February 6	Ottawa	4–5	Toronto		Anderson	19,264	19–29–5	43
54	February 7	Anaheim	0–4	Ottawa		Nilsson	12,617	20–29–5	45
55	February 9	Winnipeg	2–5	Ottawa		Nilsson	16,263	21–29–5	47
56	February 12	Carolina	4–1	Ottawa		Nilsson	10,648	21–30–5	47
57	February 14	Ottawa	2–3	Detroit		Nilsson	18,575	21–31–5	47
58	February 16	Ottawa	4–3	Winnipeg	OT	Nilsson	15,321	22–31–5	49
59	February 18	Ottawa	7–8	Chicago		Anderson	21,338	22–32–5	49
60	February 21	Ottawa	0–4	New Jersey		Nilsson	12,964	22–33–5	49
61	February 22	Columbus	3–0	Ottawa		Anderson	13,918	22–34–5	49
62	February 24	Calgary	2–1	Ottawa		Anderson	13,160	22–35–5	49
63	February 26	Ottawa	2–7	Washington		Nilsson	18,506	22–36–5	49
64	February 28	Edmonton	4–2	Ottawa		Anderson	18,358	22–37–5	49

March: 6–7–1 (Home: 4–2–0; Road: 2–5–1)
#	Date	Visitor	Score	Home	OT	Decision	Attendance	Record	Pts	Recap
65	March 2	Ottawa	1–5	Tampa Bay		Anderson	19,092	22–38–5	49
66	March 3	Ottawa	3–2	Florida		Nilsson	11,752	23–38–5	51
67	March 5	Ottawa	4–5	NY Islanders	SO	Anderson	11,445	23–38–6	52
68	March 7	NY Islanders	4–2	Ottawa		Nilsson	11,967	23–39–6	52
69	March 9	Ottawa	2–3	Boston		Anderson	17,565	23–40–6	52
70	March 11	Ottawa	2–3	Philadelphia		Anderson	18,193	23–41–6	52
71	March 14	St. Louis	0–2	Ottawa		Nilsson	13,378	24–41–6	54
72	March 16	Toronto	2–6	Ottawa		Nilsson	18,607	25–41–6	56
73	March 20	Ottawa	4–7	Vancouver		Nilsson	18,500	25–42–6	56
74	March 21	Ottawa	1–5	Calgary		Anderson	18,793	25–43–6	56
75	March 23	Ottawa	4–3	Edmonton	OT	Anderson	18,347	26–43–6	58
76	March 26	Buffalo	0–4	Ottawa		Anderson	12,074	27–43–6	60
77	March 28	Florida	5–2	Ottawa		Nilsson	14,230	27–44–6	60
78	March 30	Toronto	2–4	Ottawa		Anderson	18,655	28–44–6	62

April: 1–3–0 (Home: 0–2–0; Road: 1–1–0)
#	Date	Visitor	Score	Home	OT	Decision	Attendance	Record	Pts	Recap
79	April 1	Tampa Bay	5–2	Ottawa		Anderson	13,628	28–45–6	62
80	April 3	Ottawa	4–1	NY Rangers		Nilsson	16,562	29–45–6	64
81	April 4	Ottawa	2–5	Buffalo		Daccord	17,988	29–46–6	64
82	April 6	Columbus	6–2	Ottawa		Anderson	18,425	29–47–6	64

Legend: Win (2 points) Loss (0 points) Overtime/shootout loss (1 point)

== Players ==
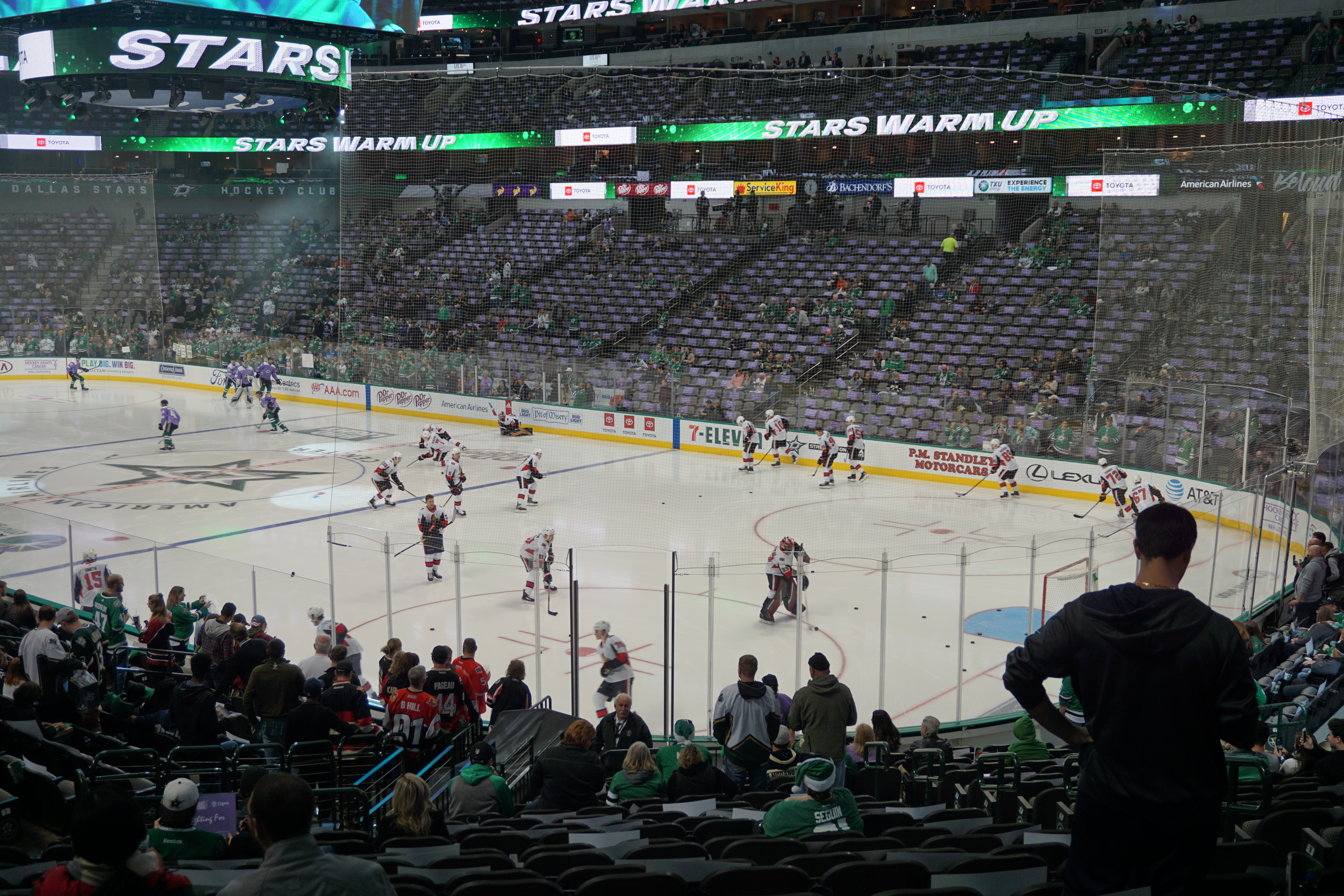
Ottawa warming up before its Nov. 23 game at Dallas

=== Statistics ===
Final Stats

==== Skaters ====
Regular season
Player	GP	G	A	Pts	+/−	PIM
Mark Stone‡	59	28	34	62	13	22
Matt Duchene‡	50	27	31	58	−2	6
Thomas Chabot	70	14	41	55	−12	32
Chris Tierney	81	9	39	48	−22	26
Brady Tkachuk	71	22	23	45	−10	75
Ryan Dzingel‡	57	22	22	44	−13	29
Bobby Ryan	78	15	27	42	−29	35
Colin White	71	14	27	41	−24	24
Mikkel Boedker	71	7	28	35	−23	6
Zack Smith	70	9	19	28	−6	81
Cody Ceci	74	7	19	26	−22	18
Dylan DeMelo	77	4	18	22	−1	32
Magnus Paajarvi	80	11	8	19	−14	6
Maxime Lajoie	56	7	8	15	−25	20
Anthony Duclair†	21	8	6	14	1	2
Brian Gibbons†	20	6	8	14	3	4
Rudolfs Balcers	36	5	9	14	−7	10
Christian Wolanin	30	4	8	12	3	6
Jean-Gabriel Pageau	39	4	8	12	−12	14
Christian Jaros	61	1	9	10	−14	27
Drake Batherson	20	3	6	9	−2	6
Oscar Lindberg†	20	5	3	8	1	4
Chris Wideman‡	19	2	3	5	−9	12
Mark Borowiecki	53	1	4	5	−12	89
Ben Harpur	51	1	4	5	−13	56
Max Veronneau	12	2	2	4	−5	0
Nick Paul	20	1	1	2	−10	4
Tom Pyatt‡	37	0	2	2	−16	2
Alex Formenton	9	1	0	1	−2	6
Max McCormick‡	14	1	0	1	−6	4
Filip Chlapik	5	1	0	1	−2	4
Stefan Elliott	3	0	1	1	1	0
Justin Falk	10	0	0	0	−4	11
Jack Rodewald	6	0	0	0	0	0
Paul Carey‡	5	0	0	0	0	0
Cody Goloubef	5	0	0	0	0	2
Erik Burgdoerfer	4	0	0	0	−1	2
Darren Archibald†	3	0	0	0	−2	0
Andreas Englund	3	0	0	0	−2	10
Logan Brown	2	0	0	0	−2	0
Erik Brannstrom	2	0	0	0	0	0
Vitalii Abramov	1	0	0	0	−3	0

==== Goaltenders ====
Regular season
Player	GP	GS	TOI	W	L	OT	GA	GAA	SA	SV%	SO	G	A	PIM
Craig Anderson	50	47	2785:11	17	27	4	163	3.51	1676	.903	2	0	2	0
Anders Nilsson^{†}	24	22	1321:52	11	11	0	64	2.90	745	.914	2	0	1	0
Mike McKenna‡	10	6	454:23	1	4	1	30	3.96	292	.897	0	0	0	0
Marcus Hogberg	4	4	205:30	0	2	1	14	4.09	121	.884	0	0	0	0
Mike Condon	2	2	75:15	0	2	0	8	6.38	40	.800	0	0	0	0
Joey Daccord	1	1	60:00	0	1	0	5	5.00	40	.875	0	0	0	0

^{†}Denotes player spent time with another team before joining the Senators. Stats reflect time with the Senators only.
^{‡}No longer with team.
Bold denotes team leader in that category.

=== Awards and honours ===
==== Awards ====
- Thomas Chabot - selected to 2019 National Hockey League All-Star Game roster

==== Milestones ====
Player	Milestone	Date
Maxime Lajoie	1st career NHL game 1st career NHL goal 1st career NHL assist 1st career NHL point	October 4, 2018
Brady Tkachuk	1st career NHL game	October 8, 2018
Brady Tkachuk	1st career NHL goal 1st career NHL assist 1st career NHL point	October 10, 2018
Christian Jaros	1st career NHL assist 1st career NHL point	October 13, 2018
Alex Formenton	1st career NHL goal 1st career NHL point	October 30, 2018
Ryan Dzingel	200th career NHL game	November 1, 2018
Magnus Paajarvi	400th career NHL game	November 3, 2018
Mark Stone	100th career NHL goal	November 6, 2018
Chris Tierney	300th career NHL game	November 8, 2018
Drake Batherson	1st career NHL game 1st career NHL goal 1st career NHL point	November 15, 2018
Matt Duchene	500th career NHL point	November 17, 2018
Drake Batherson	1st career NHL assist	November 17, 2018
Mikkel Boedker	300th career NHL point	November 21, 2018
Christian Jaros	1st career NHL goal	November 21, 2018
Tom Pyatt	100th career NHL point	November 21, 2018
Ryan Dzingel	100th career NHL point	November 29, 2018
Ben Harpur	1st career NHL goal	December 1, 2018
Cody Ceci	100th career NHL point	December 1, 2018
Thomas Chabot	100th career NHL game	December 21, 2018
Cody Ceci	400th career NHL game	December 28, 2018
Marcus Hogberg	1st career NHL game	December 29, 2018
Matt Duchene	300th career NHL assist	January 2, 2019
Rudolfs Balcers	1st career NHL game	January 5, 2019
Rudolfs Balcers	1st career NHL goal 1st career NHL point	January 6, 2019
Rudolfs Balcers	1st career NHL assist	January 10, 2019
Mikkel Boedker	200th career NHL assist	January 10, 2019
Mark Borowiecki	300th career NHL game	January 18, 2019
Mark Stone	300th career NHL point	February 1, 2019
Matt Duchene	700th career NHL game	February 9, 2019
Craig Anderson	600th career NHL game	February 18, 2019
Zack Smith	600th career NHL game	March 5, 2019
Erik Brannstrom	1st career NHL game	March 14, 2019
Max Veronneau	1st career NHL game	March 14, 2019
Bobby Ryan	800th NHL game	March 16, 2019
Dylan DeMelo	200th NHL game	March 16, 2019
Max Veronneau	1st career NHL assist 1st career NHL point	March 16, 2019
Max Veronneau	1st career NHL goal	March 20, 2019
Chris Tierney	100th career NHL assist	March 20, 2019
Vitalii Abramov	1st career NHL game	March 21, 2019
Joel Daccord	1st career NHL game	April 4, 2019

== Transactions ==
The Senators have been involved in the following transactions during the 2018–19 season.

=== Trades ===
Date	Details		Ref
June 22, 2018	To New York Rangers PIT's 1st-round pick in 2018	To Ottawa Senators BOS's 1st-round pick in 2018; NJD's 2nd-round pick in 2018	
September 13, 2018	To San Jose Sharks Erik Karlsson; Francis Perron	To Ottawa Senators Rudolfs Balcers; Dylan DeMelo; Josh Norris; Chris Tierney; SJS's 1st-round pick in 2019 or 2020; SJS's 2nd-round pick 2019; SJS' 2020 conditional pick SJS's conditional pick	
November 22, 2018	To Edmonton Oilers Chris Wideman	To Ottawa Senators STL's conditional 6th-round pick in 2020	
December 5, 2018	To Pittsburgh Penguins Macoy Erkamps; Ben Sexton	To Ottawa Senators Stefan Elliott; Tobias Lindberg	
January 2, 2019	To Vancouver Canucks Mike McKenna; Tom Pyatt; 6th-round pick in 2019	To Ottawa Senators Darren Archibald; Anders Nilsson	
January 11, 2019	To Boston Bruins Paul Carey	To Ottawa Senators Cody Goloubef	
January 11, 2019	To Toronto Maple Leafs Gabriel Gagne	To Ottawa Senators Morgan Klimchuk	
February 6, 2019	To Colorado Avalanche Max McCormick	To Ottawa Senators J. C. Beaudin	
February 22, 2019	To Columbus Blue Jackets Julius Bergman; Matt Duchene	To Ottawa Senators Vitalii Abramov; Jonathan Davidsson; Conditional 1st-round pick in 2019; Conditional 1st-round pick in 2020	
February 23, 2019	To Columbus Blue Jackets Ryan Dzingel; CGY's 7th-round pick in 2019	To Ottawa Senators Anthony Duclair; 2nd-round pick in 2020; 2nd-round pick in 2021	
February 25, 2019	To Anaheim Ducks Patrick Sieloff	To Ottawa Senators Brian Gibbons	
February 25, 2019	To Vegas Golden Knights Tobias Lindberg; Mark Stone	To Ottawa Senators Erik Brannstrom; Oscar Lindberg; DAL's 2nd-round pick in 2020	

=== Free agents ===
Date	Player	Team	Contract term	Ref
July 1, 2018	Fredrik Claesson	to New York Rangers	1-year	
July 1, 2018	Paul Carey	from New York Rangers	1-year	
July 1, 2018	Mike McKenna	from Dallas Stars	1-year	
July 3, 2018	Chris Driedger	to Springfield Thunderbirds (AHL)	1-year	
July 18, 2018	Mike Blunden	to Bozen–Bolzano Foxes (EBEL)	1-year	
July 18, 2018	Tyler Randell	to Rochester Americans (AHL)	1-year	
July 25, 2018	Adam Tambellini	from New York Rangers	1-year	
August 10, 2018	Chase Balisy	from Florida Panthers	1-year	
November 30, 2018	Justin Falk	from Colorado Eagles (AHL)	1-year	
March 12, 2019	Max Veronneau	from Princeton Tigers (ECAC Hockey)	2-year	
May 10, 2019	Olle Alsing	from Djurgårdens IF (SHL)	2-year	
June 10, 2019	Nick Ebert	from Örebro (SHL)	1-year	

=== Waivers ===
Date	Player	Team	Ref

=== Contract terminations ===
Date	Player	Via	Ref
June 27, 2018	Alex Burrows	Buyout	

=== Retirement ===
Date	Player	Ref

=== Signings ===
Date	Player	Contract term	Ref
June 24, 2018	Chris Wideman	1-year	
July 16, 2018	Nick Paul	1-year	
August 3, 2018	Cody Ceci	1-year	
August 3, 2018	Mark Stone	1-year	
August 13, 2018	Brady Tkachuk	3-year	
April 1, 2019	Joel Daccord	2-year	
April 3, 2019	Jonathan Gruden	3-year	
May 27, 2019	Josh Norris	3-year	
May 29, 2019	Anders Nilsson	2-year	
June 13, 2019	Morgan Klimchuk	1-year	
June 17, 2019	Anthony Duclair	1-year	
June 18, 2019	Andreas Englund	1-year	
June 19, 2019	Marcus Hogberg	2-year	

=== Suspensions/fines ===
Suspensions/fines
Player	Reason	Length	Salary	Date issued
Mark Borowiecki	Elbowing Boston Bruins defenceman Urho Vaakanainen during NHL game no. 125 in Ottawa on October 23	1 game	$6,451.61	October 24, 2018
Mark Borowiecki	Illegal check to the head of Vegas Golden Knights forward Cody Eakin during NHL game no. 163 in Las Vegas on October 28	3 games	$43,902.45	October 29, 2018
Jean-Gabriel Pageau	Illegal boarding of Vancouver Canucks defenceman Ashton Sautner during NHL game no. 1134 in Vancouver on March 20	1 game	$16,666.67	March 21, 2019

== Draft picks ==
Below are the Ottawa Senators' selections at the 2018 NHL entry draft, which was held on June 22 and 23, 2018, at the American Airlines Center in Dallas, Texas.

Round	Overall	Player	Position	Nationality	Club team
1	4	Brady Tkachuk	LW	United States	Boston University (Hockey East)
1	26^{1}	Jacob Bernard-Docker	D	Canada	Okotoks Oilers (AJHL)
2	48^{2}	Jonny Tychonick	D	Canada	Penticton Vees (BCHL)
4	95	Jonathan Gruden	LW	United States	U.S. NTDP (USHL)
5	126	Angus Crookshank	LW	Canada	Langley Rivermen (BCHL)
6	157	Kevin Mandolese	G	Canada	Cape Breton Screaming Eagles (QMJHL)
7	188	Jakov Novak	LW	Canada	Janesville Jets (NAHL)
7	194^{3}	Luke Loheit	RW	United States	Minnetonka High School (USHS)

Notes:

1. The Senators acquired the 26th-overall pick from the New York Rangers in exchange for the 22nd-overall pick (the Pittsburgh Penguins' first-round pick) and the 48th overall pick. The 22nd-overall pick was previously acquired by the Senators as the result of a trade on February 23, 2018, that sent Vincent Dunn and a third-round pick in 2018 to Pittsburgh in exchange for Ian Cole, Filip Gustavsson and this pick.
2. The New Jersey Devils' second-round pick went to the Senators as the result of a trade on June 22, 2018, that sent Pittsburgh's first-round pick in 2018 (22nd overall) to the New York Rangers in exchange for Boston's first-round pick in 2018 (26th overall) and this pick.
3. The New York Rangers' seventh-round pick went to the Senators as the result of a trade July 18, 2016, that sent Mika Zibanejad and a second-round pick in 2018 to New York in exchange for Derick Brassard and this pick.
