= 2018–19 San Jose Sharks season =

Season of an NHL team

2018–19 San Jose Sharks
- Division: 2nd Pacific
- Conference: 2nd Western
- 2018–19 record: 46–27–9
- Home record: 25–11–5
- Road record: 21–16–4
- Goals for: 289
- Goals against: 261

Team information
- General manager: Doug Wilson
- Coach: Peter DeBoer
- Captain: Joe Pavelski
- Alternate captains: Logan Couture; Joe Thornton
- Arena: SAP Center
- Average attendance: 17,266
- Minor league affiliate: San Jose Barracuda (AHL)

Team leaders
- Goals: Joe Pavelski (38)
- Assists: Brent Burns (67)
- Points: Brent Burns (83)
- Penalty minutes: Evander Kane (153)
- Plus/minus: Brenden Dillon (+19)
- Wins: Martin Jones (36)
- Goals against average: Martin Jones (2.94)

The 2018–19 San Jose Sharks season was the 28th season for the National Hockey League (NHL) franchise that was established on May 9, 1990. The Sharks clinched a playoff spot on March 19, 2019, when the Minnesota Wild lost to the Colorado Avalanche.

The Sharks advanced all the way to the Western Conference Finals, where they were defeated by the eventual Stanley Cup Champion St. Louis Blues in six games.

As of 2025, this represents the most recent season making the playoffs for the Sharks.

== Standings ==
Pacific Division
Pos	Team	GP	W	L	OTL	ROW	GF	GA	GD	Pts
1	z – Calgary Flames	82	50	25	7	50	289	227	+62	107
2	x – San Jose Sharks	82	46	27	9	46	289	261	+28	101
3	x – Vegas Golden Knights	82	43	32	7	40	249	230	+19	93
4	Arizona Coyotes	82	39	35	8	35	213	223	−10	86
5	Vancouver Canucks	82	35	36	11	29	225	254	−29	81
6	Anaheim Ducks	82	35	37	10	32	199	251	−52	80
7	Edmonton Oilers	82	35	38	9	32	232	274	−42	79
8	Los Angeles Kings	82	31	42	9	28	202	263	−61	71

Source: National Hockey League
x – Clinched playoff spot; z – Clinched conference

== Schedule and results ==
=== Preseason ===
The preseason schedule was published on June 18, 2018.

2018 preseason game log: 2–3–1 (Home: 1–1–1; Road: 1–2–0)
#	Date	Visitor	Score	Home	OT	Decision	Attendance	Record	Recap
1	September 18	Anaheim	1–4	San Jose		Bibeau	—	1–0–0
2	September 20	San Jose	7–3	Anaheim		Dell	15,065	2–0–0
3	September 22	Vegas	5–4	San Jose	SO	Jones	—	2–0–1
4	September 25	San Jose	5–7	Calgary		Bibeau	17,584	2–1–1
5	September 27	Calgary	4–3	San Jose		Jones	13,999	2–2–1
6	September 30	San Jose	2–5	Vegas		Jones	17,958	2–3–1

=== Regular season ===
The regular season schedule was released in June 2018.

2018–19 game log 46–27–9 (Home: 25–11–5; Road: 21–16–4)

October: 6–3–3 (Home: 2–1–1; Road: 4–2–2)
#	Date	Visitor	Score	Home	OT	Decision	Attendance	Record	Pts	Recap
1	October 3	Anaheim	5–2	San Jose		Jones	17,562	0–1–0	0
2	October 5	San Jose	3–2	Los Angeles	OT	Jones	18,230	1–1–0	2
3	October 8	San Jose	0–4	NY Islanders		Jones	8,790	1–2–0	2
4	October 9	San Jose	8–2	Philadelphia		Dell	19,133	2–2–0	4
5	October 11	San Jose	2–3	NY Rangers	OT	Dell	17,004	2–2–1	5
6	October 14	San Jose	2–3	New Jersey		Jones	13,809	2–3–1	5
7	October 18	Buffalo	1–5	San Jose		Jones	17,389	3–3–1	7
8	October 20	NY Islanders	1–4	San Jose		Jones	17,414	4–3–1	9
9	October 23	San Jose	5–4	Nashville		Jones	17,159	5–3–1	11
10	October 26	San Jose	3–4	Carolina	SO	Dell	12,311	5–3–2	12
11	October 28	San Jose	4–3	Anaheim	OT	Jones	17,099	6–3–2	14
12	October 30	NY Rangers	4–3	San Jose	SO	Jones	17,562	6–3–3	15

November: 6–6–2 (Home: 6–2–1; Road: 0–4–1)
#	Date	Visitor	Score	Home	OT	Decision	Attendance	Record	Pts	Recap
13	November 1	Columbus	4–1	San Jose		Dell	15,879	6–4–3	15
14	November 3	Philadelphia	3–4	San Jose	OT	Jones	17,562	7–4–3	17
15	November 6	Minnesota	3–4	San Jose		Jones	15,853	8–4–3	19
16	November 8	San Jose	3–4	Dallas		Jones	18,137	8–5–3	19
17	November 9	San Jose	0–4	St. Louis		Dell	17,032	8–6–3	19
18	November 11	Calgary	1–3	San Jose		Jones	17,562	9–6–3	21
19	November 13	Nashville	4–5	San Jose		Jones	16,654	10–6–3	23
20	November 15	Toronto	5–3	San Jose		Jones	17,011	10–7–3	23
21	November 17	St. Louis	0–4	San Jose		Dell	17,417	11–7–3	25
22	November 20	Edmonton	4–3	San Jose	OT	Jones	17,562	11–7–4	26
23	November 23	Vancouver	0–4	San Jose		Dell	17,056	12–7–4	28
24	November 24	San Jose	0–6	Vegas		Dell	18,252	12–8–4	28
25	November 27	San Jose	2–3	Buffalo	OT	Jones	19,070	12–8–5	29
26	November 28	San Jose	3–5	Toronto		Dell	19,362	12–9–5	29

December: 9–4–2 (Home: 4–1–2; Road: 5–3–0)
#	Date	Visitor	Score	Home	OT	Decision	Attendance	Record	Pts	Recap
27	December 1	San Jose	2–6	Ottawa		Jones	17,531	12–10–5	29
28	December 2	San Jose	3–1	Montreal		Jones	20,301	13–10–5	31
29	December 5	Carolina	1–5	San Jose		Jones	17,119	14–10–5	33
30	December 7	San Jose	2–3	Dallas		Jones	18,342	14–11–5	33
31	December 8	San Jose	5–3	Arizona		Dell	13,780	15–11–5	35
32	December 10	New Jersey	2–5	San Jose		Jones	17,097	16–11–5	37
33	December 13	Dallas	2–3	San Jose		Jones	17,185	17–11–5	39
34	December 16	San Jose	7–3	Chicago		Dell	21,237	18–11–5	41
35	December 18	San Jose	4–0	Minnesota		Jones	18,870	19–11–5	43
36	December 20	Winnipeg	5–3	San Jose		Jones	17,213	19–12–5	43
37	December 22	Los Angeles	3–2	San Jose	OT	Jones	17,562	19–12–6	44
38	December 23	Arizona	4–3	San Jose	SO	Dell	17,325	19–12–7	45
39	December 27	Anaheim	2–4	San Jose		Jones	17,562	20–12–7	47
40	December 29	San Jose	7–4	Edmonton		Jones	18,347	21–12–7	49
41	December 31	San Jose	5–8	Calgary		Dell	19,289	21–13–7	49

January: 8–3–0 (Home: 5–0–0; Road: 3–3–0)
#	Date	Visitor	Score	Home	OT	Decision	Attendance	Record	Pts	Recap
42	January 2	San Jose	5–4	Colorado		Jones	17,891	22–13–7	51
43	January 5	Tampa Bay	2–5	San Jose		Jones	17,562	23–13–7	53
44	January 7	Los Angeles	1–3	San Jose		Jones	15,447	24–13–7	55
45	January 8	Edmonton	2–7	San Jose		Dell	17,320	25–13–7	57
46	January 10	San Jose	3–2	Vegas		Jones	18,367	26–13–7	59
47	January 12	Ottawa	1–4	San Jose		Jones	17,562	27–13–7	61
48	January 15	Pittsburgh	2–5	San Jose		Jones	17,292	28–13–7	63
49	January 16	San Jose	3–6	Arizona		Dell	13,342	28–14–7	63
50	January 19	San Jose	3–6	Tampa Bay		Jones	19,092	28–15–7	63
51	January 21	San Jose	2–6	Florida		Jones	14,014	28–16–7	63
52	January 22	San Jose	7–6	Washington	OT	Jones	18,506	29–16–7	65

February: 8–3–1 (Home: 2–1–1; Road: 6–2–0)
#	Date	Visitor	Score	Home	OT	Decision	Attendance	Record	Pts	Recap
53	February 2	Arizona	2–3	San Jose	OT	Jones	17,227	30–16–7	67
54	February 5	San Jose	3–2	Winnipeg	OT	Jones	15,321	31–16–7	69
55	February 7	San Jose	5–2	Calgary		Jones	18,748	32–16–7	71
56	February 9	San Jose	5–2	Edmonton		Dell	18,347	33–16–7	73
57	February 11	San Jose	7–2	Vancouver		Jones	18,576	34–16–7	75
58	February 14	Washington	5–1	San Jose		Jones	17,562	34–17–7	75
59	February 16	Vancouver	2–3	San Jose		Jones	17,562	35–17–7	77
60	February 18	Boston	6–5	San Jose	OT	Jones	17,562	35–17–8	78
61	February 21	San Jose	4–0	Pittsburgh		Jones	18,362	36–17–8	80
62	February 23	San Jose	0–4	Columbus		Jones	19,025	36–18–8	80
63	February 24	San Jose	5–3	Detroit		Dell	19,515	37–18–8	82
64	February 26	San Jose	1–4	Boston		Jones	17,565	37–19–8	82

March: 7–7–1 (Home: 5–6–0; Road: 2–1–1)
#	Date	Visitor	Score	Home	OT	Decision	Attendance	Record	Pts	Recap
65	March 1	Colorado	3–4	San Jose		Jones	17,351	38–19–8	84
66	March 3	Chicago	2–5	San Jose		Jones	17,252	39–19–8	86
67	March 7	Montreal	2–5	San Jose		Jones	17,471	40–19–8	88
68	March 9	St. Louis	2–3	San Jose	OT	Jones	17,562	41–19–8	90
69	March 11	San Jose	3–0	Minnesota		Jones	18,907	42–19–8	92
70	March 12	San Jose	5–4	Winnipeg		Dell	15,321	43–19–8	94
71	March 14	Florida	4–2	San Jose		Jones	17,388	43–20–8	94
72	March 16	Nashville	4–2	San Jose		Jones	17,562	43–21–8	94
73	March 18	Vegas	7–3	San Jose		Dell	17,487	43–22–8	94
74	March 21	San Jose	2–4	Los Angeles		Jones	18,230	43–23–8	94
75	March 22	San Jose	3–4	Anaheim	OT	Dell	17,174	43–23–9	95
76	March 25	Detroit	3–2	San Jose		Jones	17,393	43–24–9	95
77	March 28	Chicago	5–4	San Jose		Jones	17,364	43–25–9	95
78	March 30	Vegas	3–4	San Jose	OT	Jones	17,562	44–25–9	97
79	March 31	Calgary	5–3	San Jose		Dell	17,313	44–26–9	97

April: 2–1–0 (Home: 1–0–0; Road: 1–1–0)
#	Date	Visitor	Score	Home	OT	Decision	Attendance	Record	Pts	Recap
80	April 2	San Jose	2–4	Vancouver		Jones	18,524	44–27–9	97
81	April 4	San Jose	3–2	Edmonton		Dell	18,347	45–27–9	99
82	April 6	Colorado	2–5	San Jose		Jones	17,562	46–27–9	101

Legend: Win (2 points) Loss (0 points) Overtime/shootout loss (1 point)

=== Playoffs ===
The Sharks entered the playoffs as the Pacific Division's second seed and faced the third seed of the same division, the Vegas Golden Knights, defeating them in seven games.

In the Second Round, the Sharks faced the Colorado Avalanche, defeating them in seven games.

In the Conference Finals, the Sharks faced the St. Louis Blues, and lost in six games.

2019 Stanley Cup playoffs

Western Conference First Round vs. (P3) Vegas Golden Knights: San Jose won 4–3
#	Date	Visitor	Score	Home	OT	Decision	Attendance	Series	Recap
1	April 10	Vegas	2–5	San Jose		Jones	17,562	1–0
2	April 12	Vegas	5–3	San Jose		Dell	17,562	1–1
3	April 14	San Jose	3–6	Vegas		Jones	18,461	1–2
4	April 16	San Jose	0–5	Vegas		Jones	18,567	1–3
5	April 18	Vegas	2–5	San Jose		Jones	17,562	2–3
6	April 21	San Jose	2–1	Vegas	2OT	Jones	18,458	3–3
7	April 23	Vegas	4–5	San Jose	OT	Jones	17,562	4–3

Western Conference Second Round vs. (WC2) Colorado Avalanche: San Jose won 4–3
#	Date	Visitor	Score	Home	OT	Decision	Attendance	Series	Recap
1	April 26	Colorado	2–5	San Jose		Jones	17,562	1–0
2	April 28	Colorado	4–3	San Jose		Jones	17,562	1–1
3	April 30	San Jose	4–2	Colorado		Jones	18,106	2–1
4	May 2	San Jose	0–3	Colorado		Jones	18,110	2–2
5	May 4	Colorado	1–2	San Jose		Jones	17,562	3–2
6	May 6	San Jose	3–4	Colorado	OT	Jones	18,098	3–3
7	May 8	Colorado	2–3	San Jose		Jones	17,562	4–3

Western Conference Finals vs. (C3) St. Louis Blues: St. Louis won 4–2
#	Date	Visitor	Score	Home	OT	Decision	Attendance	Series	Recap
1	May 11	St. Louis	3–6	San Jose		Jones	17,562	1–0
2	May 13	St. Louis	4–2	San Jose		Jones	17,562	1–1
3	May 15	San Jose	5–4	St. Louis	OT	Jones	18,360	2–1
4	May 17	San Jose	1–2	St. Louis		Jones	18,496	2–2
5	May 19	St. Louis	5–0	San Jose		Jones	17,562	2–3
6	May 21	San Jose	1–5	St. Louis		Jones	18,684	2–4

Legend: Win Loss

== Player statistics ==
=== Skaters ===
Regular season
Player	GP	G	A	Pts	+/−	PIM
Brent Burns	82	16	67	83	+13	34
Tomas Hertl	77	35	39	74	+5	18
Logan Couture	81	27	43	70	−6	22
Timo Meier	78	30	36	66	+9	55
Joe Pavelski	75	38	26	64	−4	22
Evander Kane	75	30	26	56	−4	153
Kevin Labanc	82	17	39	56	−1	36
Joe Thornton	73	16	35	51	+8	20
Erik Karlsson	53	3	42	45	+6	22
Joonas Donskoi	80	14	23	37	+10	10
Marcus Sorensen	80	17	13	30	+10	23
Marc-Edouard Vlasic	72	3	22	25	−6	10
Brenden Dillon	82	1	21	22	+19	61
Barclay Goodrow	82	7	10	17	+4	76
Melker Karlsson	79	12	4	16	−1	26
Justin Braun	78	2	14	16	−14	35
Tim Heed	37	2	11	13	9	10
Lukas Radil	36	7	4	11	7	6
Gustav Nyquist^{†}	19	6	5	11	+1	4
Radim Simek	41	1	8	9	7	8
Antti Suomela	27	3	5	8	1	4
Joakim Ryan	44	0	7	7	−1	15
Micheal Haley^{†}	19	1	2	3	0	45
Rourke Chartier	13	1	0	1	−5	2
Jacob Middleton	3	0	1	1	−1	2
Dylan Gambrell	8	0	0	0	1	2

Playoffs
Player	GP	G	A	Pts	+/−	PIM
Logan Couture	20	14	6	20	+3	6
Brent Burns	20	5	11	16	+2	6
Erik Karlsson	19	2	14	16	−3	8
Tomas Hertl	19	10	5	15	+2	4
Timo Meier	20	5	10	15	+3	34
Gustav Nyquist	20	1	10	11	+1	0
Joe Thornton	19	4	6	10	−6	6
Joe Pavelski	13	4	5	9	−3	4
Kevin Labanc	20	4	5	9	−7	14
Marc-Edouard Vlasic	18	3	5	8	+6	4
Evander Kane	20	2	6	8	−4	61
Marcus Sorensen	18	0	5	5	−3	2
Joonas Donskoi	12	1	2	3	+1	4
Barclay Goodrow	20	2	0	2	−3	22
Melker Karlsson	20	0	2	2	−2	4
Brenden Dillon	20	0	2	2	−8	24
Dylan Gambrell	2	1	0	1	0	2
Joakim Ryan	20	0	1	1	−2	0
Justin Braun	20	0	1	1	−3	8
Tim Heed	3	0	0	0	0	0
Lukas Radil	6	0	0	0	−1	0
Micheal Haley	11	0	0	0	−1	18

=== Goaltenders ===
Regular season
Player	GP	GS	TOI	W	L	OT	GA	GAA	SA	SV%	SO	G	A	PIM
Martin Jones	62	62	3,598	36	19	5	176	2.94	1699	.896	3	0	1	2
Aaron Dell	25	20	1,324	10	8	4	70	3.17	613	.886	2	0	0	0

Playoffs
Player	GP	GS	TOI	W	L	GA	GAA	SA	SV%	SO	G	A	PIM
Martin Jones	20	20	1154	10	9	58	3.02	567	.898	0	0	2	0
Aaron Dell	2	0	90	0	1	5	3.35	36	.861	0	0	0	0

^{†}Denotes player spent time with another team before joining the Sharks. Stats reflect time with the Sharks only.
^{‡}Denotes player was traded mid-season. Stats reflect time with the Sharks only.
Bold/italics denotes franchise record.

== Transactions ==
The Sharks have been involved in the following transactions during the 2018–19 season.

=== Trades ===
Date	Details		Ref
June 23, 2018	To Arizona Coyotes 4th-round pick in 2018; 5th-round pick in 2018	To San Jose Sharks TOR's 3rd-round pick in 2018	
June 23, 2018	To Montreal Canadiens VGK's 4th-round pick in 2018; FLA's 5th-round pick in 2018	To San Jose Sharks EDM's 4th-round pick in 2018	
September 13, 2018	To Ottawa Senators Rudols Balcers; Dylan DeMelo; Josh Norris; Chris Tierney; 2nd-round pick in 2019; 1st-round pick in 2020	To San Jose Sharks Erik Karlsson; Francis Perron	
February 22, 2019	To Florida Panthers Vincent Praplan	To San Jose Sharks Future considerations	
February 25, 2019	To Detroit Red Wings Conditional 2nd-round pick in 2019; Conditional 3rd-round pick in 2020	To San Jose Sharks Gustav Nyquist	
February 25, 2019	To Vancouver Canucks Linus Karlsson	To San Jose Sharks Jonathan Dahlen	
June 18, 2019	To Philadelphia Flyers Justin Braun	To San Jose Sharks 2nd-round pick in 2019; 3rd-round pick in 2020	

=== Free agents ===
Date	Player	Team	Contract term	Ref
July 1, 2018	Eric Fehr	to Minnesota Wild	1-year	
July 6, 2018	Vladislav Kotkov	from Chicoutimi Sagueneens (QJMHL)	3-year	
July 18, 2018	Alexander True	from San Jose Barracuda (AHL)	3-year	
August 2, 2018	Jannik Hansen	to CSKA Moscow (KHL)	1-year	
April 3, 2019	Andrew Shortridge	from Quinnipiac Bobcats (ECAC Hockey)	1-year	
April 25, 2019	Joel Kellman	from Brynäs IF (SHL)	1-year	
April 25, 2019	Danil Yurtaikin	from Lokomotiv Yaroslavl (KHL)	2-year	
May 9, 2019	Tony Sund	from Vaasan Sport (Liiga)	1-year	
May 28, 2019	Lean Bergmann	from Iserlohn Roosters (DEL)	1-year	
May 29, 2019	Jeffrey Viel	from San Jose Barracuda (AHL)	2-year	

=== Contract terminations ===
Date	Player	Via	Ref
June 23, 2018	Paul Martin	Buyout	
July 18, 2018	Noah Rod	Mutual termination	
November 16, 2018	Filip Sandberg	Mutual termination	

=== Waivers ===
Date	Player	Team	Ref
February 20, 2019	Micheal Haley	from Florida Panthers	

=== Signings ===
Date	Player	Contract term	Ref
July 1, 2018	Logan Couture	8-year	
July 2, 2018	Tomas Hertl	4-year	
July 2, 2018	Joe Thornton	1-year	
July 7, 2018	Dylan DeMelo	2-year	
July 18, 2018	Ryan Merkley	3-year	
July 18, 2018	Chris Tierney	2-year	
September 23, 2018	Jake McGrew	3-year	
October 4, 2018	Barclay Goodrow	2-year	
January 6, 2019	Lukas Radil	1-year	
January 15, 2019	Marcus Sorensen	2-year	
April 29, 2019	Mario Ferraro	3-year	
May 31, 2019	Zachary Emond	3-year	
June 17, 2019	Erik Karlsson	8-year	

== Draft picks ==
Below are the San Jose Sharks' selections at the 2018 NHL entry draft, which was held on June 22 and 23, 2018, at the American Airlines Center in Dallas, Texas.

Round	#	Player	Pos	Nationality	College/Junior/Club team (League)
1	21	Ryan Merkley	D	Canada	Guelph Storm (OHL)
3	87^{1}	Linus Karlsson	C	Sweden	Karlskrona HK J20 (SuperElit)
4	102^{2}	Jasper Weatherby	C	United States	Wenatchee Wild (BCHL)
6	176	Zachary Emond	G	Canada	Rouyn-Noranda Huskies (QMJHL)
6	182^{3}	John Leonard	LW	United States	UMass Amherst (Hockey East)

Notes:

1. The Toronto Maple Leafs' third-round pick went to the San Jose Sharks as the result of a trade on June 23, 2018, that sent a fourth and fifth-round pick both in 2018 (114th and 145th overall) to Arizona in exchange for this pick.
2. The Edmonton Oilers' fourth-round pick went to the San Jose Sharks as the result of a trade on June 23, 2018, that sent Vegas' fourth-round pick and Florida's fifth-round pick both in 2018 (123rd and 139th overall) to Montreal in exchange for this pick.
3. The Nashville Predators' sixth-round pick went to the San Jose Sharks as the result of a trade on February 25, 2018, that sent Brandon Bollig and Troy Grosenick to Nashville in exchange for this pick.

== Awards ==
Regular season
Player	Award	Awarded
Brent Burns	All-Star; Second Star of the Week	January 2, 2019; January 7, 2019
Erik Karlsson	All-Star	January 2, 2019
Joe Pavelski	Third Star of the Week; All-Star; Second Star of the Week	November 19, 2018; January 2, 2019; January 28, 2019
