= Chris Tierney =

Chris Tierney may refer to:

- Chris Tierney (soccer) (born 1986), American soccer player
- Chris Tierney (ice hockey) (born 1994), Canadian ice hockey player
- Christopher Tierney, stunt performer hurt in a preview performance of Spider-Man: Turn Off the Dark
