= 2018–19 Nashville Predators season =

Professional ice hockey team season

2018–19 Nashville Predators
- Central Division champions
- Division: 1st Central
- Conference: 3rd Western
- 2018–19 record: 47–29–6
- Home record: 25–14–2
- Road record: 22–15–4
- Goals for: 240
- Goals against: 214

Team information
- General manager: David Poile
- Coach: Peter Laviolette
- Captain: Roman Josi
- Alternate captains: Mattias Ekholm; Ryan Ellis; Filip Forsberg; Ryan Johansen
- Arena: Bridgestone Arena
- Average attendance: 17,445
- Minor league affiliate: Milwaukee Admirals (AHL)

Team leaders
- Goals: Viktor Arvidsson (34)
- Assists: Ryan Johansen (50)
- Points: Ryan Johansen (64)
- Penalty minutes: P. K. Subban (60)
- Plus/minus: Nick Bonino; Mattias Ekholm (+27)
- Wins: Pekka Rinne (30)
- Goals against average: Pekka Rinne (2.42)

The 2018–19 Nashville Predators season was the 21st season for the National Hockey League (NHL) franchise that was established on June 25, 1997. They entered the season as the defending Presidents' Trophy winners, which was won by the Tampa Bay Lightning on March 18, 2019. The Predators clinched a playoff spot on March 25, after a 1–0 win over the Minnesota Wild. They were upset in the first round by the Dallas Stars, losing in six games.

== Standings ==
Central Division
Pos	Team	GP	W	L	OTL	ROW	GF	GA	GD	Pts
1	y – Nashville Predators	82	47	29	6	43	240	214	+26	100
2	x – Winnipeg Jets	82	47	30	5	45	272	244	+28	99
3	x – St. Louis Blues	82	45	28	9	42	247	223	+24	99
4	x – Dallas Stars	82	43	32	7	42	210	202	+8	93
5	x – Colorado Avalanche	82	38	30	14	36	260	246	+14	90
6	Chicago Blackhawks	82	36	34	12	33	270	292	−22	84
7	Minnesota Wild	82	37	36	9	36	211	237	−26	83

Source: National Hockey League
x – Clinched playoff spot; y – Clinched division

== Schedule and results ==
=== Preseason ===
The preseason schedule was published on June 12, 2018.

2018 preseason game log: 3–3–0 (home: 0–2–0; road: 3–1–0)
#	Date	Visitor	Score	Home	OT	Decision	Attendance	Record	Recap
1	September 17	Nashville	5–0	Florida		Saros	5,806	1–0–0
2	September 17	Nashville	5–3	Florida		Grosenick	7,671	2–0–0
3	September 21	Tampa Bay	5–1	Nashville		Rinne	17,342	2–1–0
4	September 22	Nashville	2–5	Tampa Bay		Saros	14,457	2–2–0
5	September 25	Carolina	4–1	Nashville		Rinne	17,188	2–3–0
6	September 30	Nashville	5–4	Carolina	OT	Saros	18,640	3–3–0

=== Regular season ===
The regular season schedule was released on June 21, 2018.

2018–19 game log

October: 9–3–0 (home: 4–3–0; road: 5–0–0)
#	Date	Visitor	Score	Home	OT	Decision	Attendance	Record	Pts	Recap
1	October 4	Nashville	3–2	NY Rangers		Rinne	17,117	1–0–0	2
2	October 6	Nashville	4–3	NY Islanders		Saros	12,163	2–0–0	4
3	October 9	Calgary	3–0	Nashville		Rinne	17,209	2–1–0	4
4	October 11	Winnipeg	0–3	Nashville		Rinne	17,228	3–1–0	6
5	October 13	NY Islanders	2–5	Nashville		Saros	17,208	4–1–0	8
6	October 15	Minnesota	2–4	Nashville		Rinne	17,165	5–1–0	10
7	October 19	Nashville	5–3	Calgary		Saros	18,725	6–1–0	12
8	October 20	Nashville	3–0	Edmonton		Saros	18,347	7–1–0	14
9	October 23	San Jose	5–4	Nashville		Saros	17,159	7–2–0	14
10	October 25	Nashville	4–3	New Jersey	OT	Saros	15,164	8–2–0	16
11	October 27	Edmonton	5–3	Nashville		Saros	17,248	8–3–0	16
12	October 30	Vegas	1–4	Nashville		Saros	17,367	9–3–0	18

November: 8–5–1 (home: 5–2–0; road: 3–3–1)
#	Date	Visitor	Score	Home	OT	Decision	Attendance	Record	Pts	Recap
13	November 1	Nashville	4–1	Tampa Bay		Rinne	19,092	10–3–0	20
14	November 3	Boston	0–1	Nashville		Rinne	17,535	11–3–0	22
15	November 7	Nashville	4–1	Colorado		Rinne	16,923	12–3–0	24
16	November 10	Nashville	5–4	Dallas	OT	Saros	18,532	13–3–0	26
17	November 12	Nashville	1–2	Anaheim	SO	Rinne	16,629	13–3–1	27
18	November 13	Nashville	4–5	San Jose		Saros	16,654	13–4–1	27
19	November 15	Nashville	1–2	Arizona		Rinne	13,315	13–5–1	27
20	November 17	Los Angeles	3–5	Nashville		Rinne	17,627	14–5–1	29
21	November 19	Tampa Bay	2–3	Nashville		Rinne	17,419	15–5–1	31
22	November 21	St. Louis	1–4	Nashville		Rinne	17,558	16–5–1	33
23	November 23	Nashville	2–6	St. Louis		Saros	16,192	16–6–1	33
24	November 25	Anaheim	2–5	Nashville		Rinne	17,167	17–6–1	35
25	November 27	Colorado	3–2	Nashville		Rinne	17,163	17–7–1	35
26	November 29	Arizona	3–0	Nashville		Rinne	17,165	17–8–1	35

December: 6–7–1 (home: 5–2–0; road: 1–5–1)
#	Date	Visitor	Score	Home	OT	Decision	Attendance	Record	Pts	Recap
27	December 1	Chicago	2–5	Nashville		Rinne	17,548	18–8–1	37
28	December 3	Buffalo	1–2	Nashville		Rinne	17,311	19–8–1	39
29	December 6	Nashville	3–5	Vancouver		Rinne	16,894	19–9–1	39
30	December 8	Nashville	2–5	Calgary		Saros	17,717	19–10–1	39
31	December 11	Ottawa	1–3	Nashville		Rinne	17,162	20–10–1	41
32	December 13	Vancouver	3–4	Nashville	OT	Rinne	17,206	21–10–1	43
33	December 15	New Jersey	1–2	Nashville	SO	Saros	17,446	22–10–1	45
34	December 17	Nashville	3–4	Ottawa	OT	Saros	14,492	22–10–2	46
35	December 18	Nashville	1–2	Chicago		Rinne	21,223	22–11–2	46
36	December 20	Nashville	1–2	Philadelphia		Rinne	19,142	22–12–2	46
37	December 22	Nashville	2–5	Boston		Rinne	17,565	22–13–2	46
38	December 27	Dallas	2–0	Nashville		Rinne	17,676	22–14–2	46
39	December 29	NY Rangers	4–3	Nashville		Rinne	17,673	22–15–2	46
40	December 31	Nashville	6–3	Washington		Rinne	18,506	23–15–2	48

January: 7–3–2 (home: 2–2–0; road: 5–1–2)
#	Date	Visitor	Score	Home	OT	Decision	Attendance	Record	Pts	Recap
41	January 1	Philadelphia	0–4	Nashville		Saros	17,481	24–15–2	50
42	January 4	Nashville	3–4	Detroit	OT	Rinne	19,515	24–15–3	51
43	January 5	Nashville	4–1	Montreal		Saros	21,302	25–15–3	53
44	January 7	Nashville	4–0	Toronto		Rinne	19,059	26–15–3	55
45	January 9	Nashville	4–3	Chicago	OT	Rinne	21,255	27–15–3	57
46	January 10	Nashville	3–4	Columbus	OT	Rinne	17,065	27–15–4	58
47	January 13	Nashville	3–6	Carolina		Rinne	16,347	27–16–4	58
48	January 15	Washington	2–7	Nashville		Saros	17,336	28–16–4	60
49	January 17	Winnipeg	5–1	Nashville		Rinne	17,507	28–17–4	60
50	January 19	Florida	4–2	Nashville		Saros	17,716	28–18–4	60
51	January 21	Nashville	4–1	Colorado		Rinne	18,018	29–18–4	62
52	January 23	Nashville	2–1	Vegas		Saros	18,477	30–18–4	64

February: 7–6–1 (home: 5–3–1; road: 2–3–0)
#	Date	Visitor	Score	Home	OT	Decision	Attendance	Record	Pts	Recap
53	February 1	Nashville	4–1	Florida		Saros	13,158	31–18–4	66
54	February 2	Dallas	3–1	Nashville		Rinne	17,722	31–19–4	66
55	February 5	Arizona	2–5	Nashville		Rinne	17,295	32–19–4	68
56	February 7	Dallas	2–3	Nashville	OT	Saros	17,174	33–19–4	70
57	February 9	Nashville	2–3	St. Louis		Rinne	18,166	33–20–4	70
58	February 10	St. Louis	5–4	Nashville	OT	Saros	17,622	33–20–5	71
59	February 12	Detroit	3–2	Nashville		Rinne	17,260	33–21–5	71
60	February 14	Montreal	1–3	Nashville		Rinne	17,417	34–21–5	73
61	February 16	Nashville	1–5	Vegas		Saros	18,430	34–22–5	73
62	February 19	Nashville	5–3	Dallas		Rinne	17,985	35–22–5	75
63	February 21	Los Angeles	1–2	Nashville		Rinne	17,510	36–22–5	77
64	February 23	Colorado	5–0	Nashville		Rinne	17,760	36–23–5	77
65	February 25	Edmonton	2–3	Nashville	SO	Rinne	17,481	37–23–5	79
66	February 26	Nashville	0–2	St. Louis		Saros	16,645	37–24–5	79

March: 7–5–1 (home: 2–2–1; road: 5–3–0)
#	Date	Visitor	Score	Home	OT	Decision	Attendance	Record	Pts	Recap
67	March 1	Nashville	3–5	Winnipeg		Rinne	15,321	37–25–5	79
68	March 3	Nashville	3–2	Minnesota	SO	Saros	18,885	38–25–5	81
69	March 5	Minnesota	4–5	Nashville	SO	Rinne	17,668	39–25–5	83
70	March 9	Carolina	5–3	Nashville		Saros	17,724	39–26–5	83
71	March 12	Nashville	2–3	Anaheim		Rinne	16,811	39–27–5	83
72	March 14	Nashville	3–1	Los Angeles		Rinne	17,730	40–27–5	85
73	March 16	Nashville	4–2	San Jose		Saros	17,562	41–27–5	87
74	March 19	Toronto	0–3	Nashville		Rinne	17,499	42–27–5	89
75	March 21	Pittsburgh	2–1	Nashville	SO	Rinne	17,729	42–27–6	90
76	March 23	Nashville	0–5	Winnipeg		Rinne	15,321	42–28–6	90
77	March 25	Nashville	1–0	Minnesota		Saros	18,833	43–28–6	92
78	March 29	Nashville	3–1	Pittsburgh		Rinne	18,632	44–28–6	94
79	March 30	Columbus	5–2	Nashville		Saros	17,751	44–29–6	94

April: 3–0–0 (home: 2–0–0; road: 1–0–0)
#	Date	Visitor	Score	Home	OT	Decision	Attendance	Record	Pts	Recap
80	April 2	Nashville	3–2	Buffalo		Rinne	16,569	45–29–6	96
81	April 4	Vancouver	2–3	Nashville		Rinne	17,669	46–29–6	98
82	April 6	Chicago	2–5	Nashville		Rinne	17,694	47–29–6	100

Legend: Win (2 points) Loss (0 points) Overtime/shootout loss (1 point)

=== Playoffs ===
The Predators faced the Dallas Stars in the First Round of the playoffs, and were defeated in six games.

2019 Stanley Cup playoffs

Western Conference first round vs. (WC1) Dallas Stars: Dallas won 4–2
#	Date	Visitor	Score	Home	OT	Decision	Attendance	Series	Recap
1	April 10	Dallas	3–2	Nashville		Rinne	17,458	0–1
2	April 13	Dallas	1–2	Nashville	OT	Rinne	17,611	1–1
3	April 15	Nashville	3–2	Dallas		Rinne	18,532	2–1
4	April 17	Nashville	1–5	Dallas		Rinne	18,532	2–2
5	April 20	Dallas	5–3	Nashville		Rinne	17,633	2–3
6	April 22	Nashville	1–2	Dallas	OT	Rinne	19,025	2–4

Legend: Win Loss

== Player statistics ==
As of April 22, 2019

=== Skaters ===
Regular season
Player	GP	G	A	Pts	+/−	PIM
Ryan Johansen	80	14	50	64	7	42
Roman Josi	82	15	41	56	9	42
Filip Forsberg	64	28	22	50	8	26
Viktor Arvidsson	58	34	14	48	12	26
Mattias Ekholm	80	8	36	44	27	47
Ryan Ellis	82	7	34	41	21	20
Craig Smith	76	21	17	38	11	20
Nick Bonino	81	17	18	35	27	18
Kevin Fiala^{‡}	64	10	22	32	−11	26
P. K. Subban	63	9	22	31	5	60
Colton Sissons	75	15	15	30	20	23
Calle Jarnkrok	79	10	16	26	13	12
Kyle Turris	55	7	16	23	−6	33
Ryan Hartman^{‡}	64	10	10	20	7	44
Austin Watson	37	7	9	16	11	39
Rocco Grimaldi	53	5	8	13	−2	10
Yannick Weber	62	2	6	8	7	18
Miikka Salomaki	37	3	4	7	5	8
Matt Irwin	44	1	6	7	5	38
Brian Boyle^{†}	26	5	0	5	−1	16
Mikael Granlund^{†}	16	1	4	5	−6	4
Dan Hamhuis	57	0	5	5	−2	28
Frederick Gaudreau	55	3	1	4	1	2
Wayne Simmonds^{†}	17	1	2	3	4	9
Zac Rinaldo	23	1	2	3	1	20
Anthony Bitetto^{‡}	18	0	3	3	1	8
Eeli Tolvanen	4	1	1	2	2	0
Dante Fabbro	4	1	0	1	−1	0
Matt Donovan	2	0	1	1	0	2
Cody McLeod^{†}	7	0	0	0	−3	7
Anthony Richard	1	0	0	0	−1	0
Phillip Di Giuseppe	3	0	0	0	−1	0
Colin Blackwell	6	0	0	0	−1	2
Rem Pitlick	1	0	0	0	0	2

Playoffs
Player	GP	G	A	Pts	+/−	PIM
Roman Josi	6	2	2	4	−1	4
Rocco Grimaldi	5	3	0	3	1	0
P. K. Subban	6	1	2	3	−3	0
Ryan Ellis	6	0	3	3	−2	0
Ryan Johansen	6	1	1	2	−2	2
Filip Forsberg	6	1	1	2	−2	6
Kyle Turris	6	1	1	2	2	2
Austin Watson	6	1	1	2	−2	6
Mikael Granlund	6	1	1	2	1	2
Nick Bonino	6	0	2	2	−3	2
Calle Jarnkrok	6	0	2	2	1	2
Brian Boyle	3	0	2	2	4	2
Mattias Ekholm	6	0	2	2	−2	12
Craig Smith	6	1	0	1	0	2
Miikka Salomaki	2	0	1	1	0	0
Dante Fabbro	6	0	1	1	2	0
Dan Hamhuis	6	0	0	0	2	0
Viktor Arvidsson	6	0	0	0	−2	2
Colton Sissons	6	0	0	0	−5	6
Wayne Simmonds	2	0	0	0	1	0

=== Goaltenders ===
Regular season
Player	GP	GS	TOI	W	L	OT	GA	GAA	SA	SV%	SO	G	A	PIM
Pekka Rinne	56	55	3,219:44	30	19	4	130	2.42	1,581	.918	4	0	0	4
Juuse Saros	31	27	1,696:13	17	10	2	74	2.62	870	.915	3	0	0	0

Playoffs
Player	GP	GS	TOI	W	L	GA	GAA	SA	SV%	SO	G	A	PIM
Pekka Rinne	6	6	329:38	2	4	17	3.09	179	.905	0	0	0	0
Juuse Saros	1	0	45:29	0	0	1	1.32	21	.952	0	0	0	2

^{†}Denotes player spent time with another team before joining the Predators. Stats reflect time with the Predators only.
^{‡}Denotes player was traded mid-season. Stats reflect time with the Predators only.
Bold/italics denotes franchise record.

== Transactions ==
The Predators have been involved in the following transactions during the 2018–19 season.

=== Trades ===
Date	Details		Ref
June 23, 2018	To Florida Panthers 3rd-round pick in 2018	To Nashville Predators 3rd-round pick in 2019	
October 1, 2018	To Buffalo Sabres Jack Dougherty	To Nashville Predators Nicholas Baptiste	
January 14, 2019	To New York Rangers Connor Brickley	To Nashville Predators Cole Schneider	
February 6, 2019	To New Jersey Devils 2nd-round pick in 2019	To Nashville Predators Brian Boyle	
February 6, 2019	To New York Rangers 7th-round pick in 2020	To Nashville Predators Cody McLeod	
February 8, 2019	To Arizona Coyotes Emil Pettersson	To Nashville Predators Laurent Dauphin; Adam Helewka	
February 24, 2019	To Toronto Maple Leafs Nicholas Baptiste	To Nashville Predators Future considerations	
February 25, 2019	To Minnesota Wild Kevin Fiala	To Nashville Predators Mikael Granlund	
February 25, 2019	To Philadelphia Flyers Ryan Hartman; Conditional 4th-round pick in 2020	To Nashville Predators Wayne Simmonds	
June 14, 2019	To Tampa Bay Lightning 7th-round pick in 2021	To Nashville Predators Connor Ingram	

=== Free agents ===
Date	Player	Team	Contract term	Ref
July 1, 2018	Connor Brickley	from Florida Panthers	1-year	
July 1, 2018	Rocco Grimaldi	from Colorado Avalanche	1-year	
July 1, 2018	Mark McNeill	to Boston Bruins	1-year	
July 1, 2018	John Ramage	to New Jersey Devils	1-year	
July 1, 2018	Jarred Tinordi	from Pittsburgh Penguins	1-year	
July 2, 2018	Zac Rinaldo	from Arizona Coyotes	1-year	
July 3, 2018	Colin Blackwell	from Rochester Americans (AHL)	2-year	
July 3, 2018	Zachary Magwood	from Barrie Colts (OHL)	3-year	
July 12, 2018	Harry Zolnierczyk	to Springfield Falcons (AHL)	Unknown	
July 25, 2018	Dan Hamhuis	from Dallas Stars	2-year	
July 30, 2018	Trevor Smith	to San Antonio Rampage (AHL)	Unknown	
September 2, 2018	Alexei Emelin	to Avangard Omsk (KHL)	3-year	
September 16, 2018	Anders Lindback	to Davos (NL)	1-year	
November 4, 2018	Matt Donovan	from Milwaukee Admirals (AHL)	2-year	
February 19, 2019	Tom McCollum	from Milwaukee Admirals (AHL)	1-year	
April 5, 2019	Lukas Craggs	from Bowling Green Falcons (WCHA)	2-year	
April 5, 2019	Brandon Fortunato	from Quinnipiac Bobcats (ECAC Hockey)	2-year	
April 18, 2019	Josh Wilkins	from Providence Friars (Hockey East)	2-year	
May 1, 2019	Mathieu Olivier	from Milwaukee Admirals (AHL)	2-year	

=== Waivers ===
Date	Player	Team	Ref
January 1, 2019	Phillip Di Giuseppe	from Carolina Hurricanes	
January 25, 2019	Anthony Bitetto	to Minnesota Wild	

=== Contract terminations ===
Date	Player	Via	Ref
November 2, 2018	Tyler Moy	Mutual termination	
November 8, 2018	Carl Persson	Mutual termination	
December 29, 2018	Joonas Lyytinen	Mutual termination	
January 9, 2019	Miroslav Svoboda	Mutual termination	
May 25, 2019	Filip Pyrochta	Mutual termination	

=== Retirement ===
Date	Player	Ref
May 12, 2018	Mike Fisher	
October 1, 2018	Scott Hartnell	

=== Signings ===
Date	Player	Contract term	Ref
July 16, 2018	Ryan Hartman	1-year	
July 16, 2018	Juuse Saros	3-year	
July 30, 2018	Miikka Salomaki	1-year	
August 14, 2018	Ryan Ellis	8-year	
November 3, 2018	Pekka Rinne	2-year	
February 27, 2019	Laurent Dauphin	1-year	
February 27, 2019	Adam Helewka	1-year	
March 1, 2019	Troy Grosenick	1-year	
March 22, 2019	Rem Pitlick	2-year	
March 27, 2019	Dante Fabbro	3-year	

== Draft picks ==
Below are the Nashville Predators' selections at the 2018 NHL entry draft, which was held on June 22 and 23, 2018, at the American Airlines Center in Dallas, Texas.

Round	#	Player	Pos	Nationality	College/Junior/Club team (League)
4	111^{1}	Jachym Kondelik	C	Czech Republic	Muskegon Lumberjacks (USHL)
5	131^{2}	Spencer Stastney	D	United States	U.S. NTDP (USHL)
5	151	Vladislav Yeryomenko	D	Belarus	Calgary Hitmen (WHL)
7	213	Milan Kloucek	G	Czech Republic	Dynamo Pardubice (ELH)

=== Notes ===
1. The Columbus Blue Jackets' fourth-round pick went to the Nashville Predators as the result of a trade on February 25, 2018, that sent Mark Letestu to Columbus in exchange for this pick.
2. The Chicago Blackhawks' fifth-round pick went to the Nashville Predators as the result of a trade on February 26, 2018, that sent Victor Ejdsell and a first and fourth-round pick both in 2018 to Chicago in exchange for Ryan Hartman and this pick.
