= 2018–19 Edmonton Oilers season =

NHL team season

2018–19 Edmonton Oilers
- Division: 7th Pacific
- Conference: 14th Western
- 2018–19 record: 35–38–9
- Home record: 18–19–4
- Road record: 17–19–5
- Goals for: 232
- Goals against: 274

Team information
- General manager: Peter Chiarelli (Oct. 6 – Jan. 22); Keith Gretzky (Jan. 23 – April 6) (interim)
- Coach: Todd McLellan (Oct. 6 – Nov. 20); Ken Hitchcock (Nov. 20 – April 6)
- Captain: Connor McDavid
- Alternate captains: Adam Larsson; Milan Lucic; Ryan Nugent-Hopkins
- Arena: Rogers Place
- Average attendance: 18,347
- Minor league affiliates: Bakersfield Condors (AHL); Wichita Thunder (ECHL)

Team leaders
- Goals: Leon Draisaitl (50)
- Assists: Connor McDavid (75)
- Points: Connor McDavid (116)
- Penalty minutes: Zack Kassian (102)
- Plus/minus: Matt Benning (+11)
- Wins: Mikko Koskinen (25)
- Goals against average: Mikko Koskinen (2.93)

The 2018–19 Edmonton Oilers season was the 40th season for the National Hockey League (NHL) franchise that was established on June 22, 1979, and 47th season including their play in the World Hockey Association (WHA). The Oilers were eliminated from playoff contention on April 1, 2019, after the St. Louis Blues' shootout win against the Colorado Avalanche, missing the playoffs for the second consecutive season for the first time since the for the first time since the 2014–15 season and the 2015–16 season and for the twelfth time in the past thirteen seasons. As of the 2025–26 season, this is the most recent season the Oilers have missed the playoffs.

== Standings ==
Pacific Division
Pos	Team	GP	W	L	OTL	ROW	GF	GA	GD	Pts
1	z – Calgary Flames	82	50	25	7	50	289	227	+62	107
2	x – San Jose Sharks	82	46	27	9	46	289	261	+28	101
3	x – Vegas Golden Knights	82	43	32	7	40	249	230	+19	93
4	Arizona Coyotes	82	39	35	8	35	213	223	−10	86
5	Vancouver Canucks	82	35	36	11	29	225	254	−29	81
6	Anaheim Ducks	82	35	37	10	32	199	251	−52	80
7	Edmonton Oilers	82	35	38	9	32	232	274	−42	79
8	Los Angeles Kings	82	31	42	9	28	202	263	−61	71

Source: National Hockey League
x – Clinched playoff spot; z – Clinched conference

Western Conference Wild Card
Pos	Div	Team	GP	W	L	OTL	ROW	GF	GA	GD	Pts
1	CE	x – Dallas Stars	82	43	32	7	42	210	202	+8	93
2	CE	x – Colorado Avalanche	82	38	30	14	36	260	246	+14	90
3	PA	Arizona Coyotes	82	39	35	8	35	213	223	−10	86
4	CE	Chicago Blackhawks	82	36	34	12	33	270	292	−22	84
5	CE	Minnesota Wild	82	37	36	9	36	211	237	−26	83
6	PA	Vancouver Canucks	82	35	36	11	29	225	254	−29	81
7	PA	Anaheim Ducks	82	35	37	10	32	199	251	−52	80
8	PA	Edmonton Oilers	82	35	38	9	32	232	274	−42	79
9	PA	Los Angeles Kings	82	31	42	9	28	202	263	−61	71

Source: National Hockey League
x – Clinched playoff spot

== Schedule and results ==
=== Pre-season ===
The pre-season schedule was published on June 13, 2018.

2018 pre-season game log: 7–1–0 (Home: 4–0–0; Road: 3–1–0)
#	Date	Visitor	Score	Home	OT	Decision	Attendance	Record	Recap
1	September 17	Edmonton	7–4	Calgary		Starrett	17,311	1–0–0
2	September 18	Edmonton	4–2	Vancouver		Talbot	–	2–0–0
3	September 20	Winnipeg	3–7	Edmonton		Talbot	18,347	3–0–0
4	September 23	Edmonton	3–5	Winnipeg		Koskinen	15,321	3–1–0
5	September 25	Vancouver	0–6	Edmonton		Talbot	18,347	4–1–0
6	September 27	Arizona	2–3	Edmonton	OT	Koskinen	18,347	5–1–0
7	September 29	Calgary	3–4	Edmonton		Talbot	18,347	6–1–0
–^{[a]}	October 3	Edmonton	4–3	Kölner Haie	OT	Koskinen	18,400	7–1–0
Notes:^{a} Game was played at Lanxess Arena in Cologne, Germany.

=== Regular season ===
The regular season schedule was released on June 21, 2018.

2018–19 game log

October: 6–4–1 (Home: 2–2–1; Road: 4–2–0)
#	Date	Visitor	Score	Home	OT	Decision	Attendance	Record	Pts	Recap
1^{[a]}	October 6	Edmonton	2–5	New Jersey		Talbot	12,044	0–1–0	0
2	October 11	Edmonton	1–4	Boston		Talbot	17,565	0–2–0	0
3	October 13	Edmonton	2–1	NY Rangers		Talbot	17,085	1–2–0	2
4	October 16	Edmonton	5–4	Winnipeg	OT	Talbot	15,321	2–2–0	4
5	October 18	Boston	2–3	Edmonton	OT	Talbot	18,347	3–2–0	6
6	October 20	Nashville	3–0	Edmonton		Talbot	18,347	3–3–0	6
7	October 23	Pittsburgh	6–5	Edmonton	OT	Talbot	18,347	3–3–1	7
8	October 25	Washington	1–4	Edmonton		Talbot	18,347	4–3–1	9
9	October 27	Edmonton	5–3	Nashville		Koskinen	17,248	5–3–1	11
10	October 28	Edmonton	2–1	Chicago	OT	Talbot	20,987	6–3–1	13
11	October 30	Minnesota	4–3	Edmonton		Talbot	18,347	6–4–1	13

November: 6–7–1 (Home: 4–2–0; Road: 2–5–1)
#	Date	Visitor	Score	Home	OT	Decision	Attendance	Record	Pts	Recap
12	November 1	Chicago	0–4	Edmonton		Koskinen	18,347	7–4–1	15
13	November 3	Edmonton	4–3	Detroit		Koskinen	19,515	8–4–1	17
14	November 5	Edmonton	2–4	Washington		Talbot	18,506	8–5–1	17
15	November 6	Edmonton	2–5	Tampa Bay		Koskinen	19,092	8–6–1	17
16	November 8	Edmonton	1–4	Florida		Talbot	11,484	8–7–1	17
17	November 11	Colorado	4–1	Edmonton		Talbot	18,347	8–8–1	17
18	November 13	Montreal	2–6	Edmonton		Koskinen	18,347	9–8–1	19
19	November 17	Edmonton	2–4	Calgary		Koskinen	19,289	9–9–1	19
20	November 18	Vegas	6–3	Edmonton		Talbot	18,347	9–10–1	19
21	November 20	Edmonton	4–3	San Jose	OT	Koskinen	17,562	10–10–1	21
22	November 23	Edmonton	1–2	Anaheim	OT	Koskinen	16,497	10–10–2	22
23	November 25	Edmonton	2–5	Los Angeles		Talbot	17,581	10–11–2	22
24	November 27	Dallas	0–1	Edmonton	OT	Koskinen	18,347	11–11–2	24
25	November 29	Los Angeles	2–3	Edmonton		Koskinen	18,347	12–11–2	26

December: 6–7–1 (Home: 4–5–0; Road: 2–2–1)
#	Date	Visitor	Score	Home	OT	Decision	Attendance	Record	Pts	Recap
26	December 1	Vegas	1–2	Edmonton		Koskinen	18,347	13–11–2	28
27	December 3	Edmonton	1–4	Dallas		Koskinen	18,125	13–12–2	28
28	December 5	Edmonton	3–2	St. Louis	SO	Talbot	16,551	14–12–2	30
29	December 7	Minnesota	2–7	Edmonton		Talbot	18,347	15–12–2	32
30	December 9	Calgary	0–1	Edmonton		Koskinen	18,347	16–12–2	34
31	December 11	Edmonton	6–4	Colorado		Koskinen	15,809	17–12–2	36
32	December 13	Edmonton	4–5	Winnipeg	OT	Talbot	15,321	17–12–3	37
33	December 14	Philadelphia	1–4	Edmonton		Koskinen	18,347	18–12–3	39
34	December 16	Edmonton	2–4	Vancouver		Koskinen	18,036	18–13–3	39
35	December 18	St. Louis	4–1	Edmonton		Talbot	18,347	18–14–3	39
36	December 22	Tampa Bay	6–3	Edmonton		Koskinen	18,347	18–15–3	39
37	December 27	Vancouver	4–2	Edmonton		Koskinen	18,347	18–16–3	39
38	December 29	San Jose	7–4	Edmonton		Talbot	18,347	18–17–3	39
39	December 31	Winnipeg	4–3	Edmonton		Koskinen	18,347	18–18–3	39

January: 5–6–0 (Home: 2–4–0; Road: 3–2–0)
#	Date	Visitor	Score	Home	OT	Decision	Attendance	Record	Pts	Recap
40	January 2	Edmonton	3–1	Arizona		Koskinen	12,583	19–18–3	41
41	January 5	Edmonton	0–4	Los Angeles		Koskinen	18,230	19–19–3	41
42	January 6	Edmonton	4–0	Anaheim		Talbot	17,317	20–19–3	43
43	January 8	Edmonton	2–7	San Jose		Talbot	17,320	20–20–3	43
44	January 10	Florida	3–4	Edmonton	SO	Talbot	18,347	21–20–3	45
45	January 12	Arizona	3–2	Edmonton		Talbot	18,347	21–21–3	45
46	January 14	Buffalo	2–7	Edmonton		Koskinen	18,347	22–21–3	47
47	January 16	Edmonton	3–2	Vancouver	SO	Koskinen	18,166	23–21–3	49
48	January 19	Calgary	5–2	Edmonton		Koskinen	18,347	23–22–3	49
49	January 20	Carolina	7–4	Edmonton		Koskinen	18,347	23–23–3	49
50	January 22	Detroit	3–2	Edmonton		Koskinen	18,347	23–24–3	49

February: 4–6–4 (Home: 2–2–1; Road: 2–4–3)
#	Date	Visitor	Score	Home	OT	Decision	Attendance	Record	Pts	Recap
51	February 2	Edmonton	4–5	Philadelphia	OT	Talbot	19,526	23–24–4	50
52	February 3	Edmonton	3–4	Montreal	OT	Koskinen	21,302	23–24–5	51
53	February 5	Chicago	6–2	Edmonton		Talbot	18,347	23–25–5	51
54	February 7	Edmonton	4–1	Minnesota		Talbot	18,904	24–25–5	53
55	February 9	San Jose	5–2	Edmonton		Talbot	18,347	24–26–5	53
56	February 13	Edmonton	1–3	Pittsburgh		Koskinen	18,570	24–27–5	53
57	February 15	Edmonton	1–3	Carolina		Koskinen	14,430	24–28–5	53
58	February 16	Edmonton	2–5	NY Islanders		Koskinen	14,812	24–29–5	53
59	February 19	Arizona	3–2	Edmonton	SO	Koskinen	18,347	24–29–6	54
60	February 21	NY Islanders	3–4	Edmonton	OT	Koskinen	18,347	25–29–6	56
61	February 23	Anaheim	1–2	Edmonton		Koskinen	18,347	26–29–6	58
62	February 25	Edmonton	2–3	Nashville	SO	Koskinen	17,481	26–29–7	59
63	February 27	Edmonton	2–6	Toronto		Koskinen	19,356	26–30–7	59
64	February 28	Edmonton	4–2	Ottawa		Koskinen	18,358	27–30–7	61

March: 7–5–2 (Home: 4–3–2; Road: 3–2–0)
#	Date	Visitor	Score	Home	OT	Decision	Attendance	Record	Pts	Recap
65	March 2	Edmonton	4–0	Columbus		Koskinen	18,628	28–30–7	63
66	March 4	Edmonton	4–3	Buffalo		Koskinen	17,775	29–30–7	65
67	March 7	Vancouver	2–3	Edmonton		Koskinen	18,347	30–30–7	67
68	March 9	Toronto	3–2	Edmonton		Stolarz	18,347	30–31–7	67
69	March 11	NY Rangers	2–3	Edmonton	OT	Koskinen	18,347	31–31–7	69
70	March 13	New Jersey	6–3	Edmonton		Koskinen	18,347	31–32–7	69
71	March 16	Edmonton	3–2	Arizona	OT	Koskinen	15,016	32–32–7	71
72	March 17	Edmonton	3–6	Vegas		Koskinen	18,317	32–33–7	71
73	March 19	Edmonton	2–7	St. Louis		Koskinen	17,873	32–34–7	71
74	March 21	Columbus	1–4	Edmonton		Koskinen	18,347	33–34–7	73
75	March 23	Ottawa	4–3	Edmonton	OT	Koskinen	18,347	33–34–8	74
76	March 26	Los Angeles	4–8	Edmonton		Koskinen	18,347	34–34–8	76
77	March 28	Dallas	3–2	Edmonton	SO	Koskinen	18,347	34–34–9	77
78	March 30	Anaheim	5–1	Edmonton		Koskinen	18,347	34–35–9	77

April: 1–3–0 (Home: 0–1–0; Road: 1–2–0)
#	Date	Visitor	Score	Home	OT	Decision	Attendance	Record	Pts	Recap
79	April 1	Edmonton	1–3	Vegas		Koskinen	18,367	34–36–9	77
80	April 2	Edmonton	2–6	Colorado		Koskinen	17,021	34–37–9	77
81	April 4	San Jose	3–2	Edmonton		Stolarz	18,347	34–38–9	77
82	April 6	Edmonton	3–1	Calgary		Koskinen	19,289	35–38–9	79

Legend: Win (2 points) Loss (0 points) Overtime/shootout loss (1 point)
Notes:
^{a} Game was played at Scandinavium in Gothenburg, Sweden.

== Player statistics ==
As of April 6, 2019

=== Skaters ===
Regular season
Player	GP	G	A	Pts	+/−	PIM
Connor McDavid	78	41	75	116	3	20
Leon Draisaitl	82	50	55	105	2	52
Ryan Nugent-Hopkins	82	28	41	69	−13	26
Darnell Nurse	82	10	31	41	−5	87
Alex Chiasson	73	22	16	38	−1	32
Oscar Klefbom	61	5	23	28	−11	16
Zack Kassian	79	15	11	26	−6	102
Milan Lucic	79	6	14	20	−9	91
Adam Larsson	82	3	17	20	−28	44
Jujhar Khaira	60	3	15	18	−12	43
Matt Benning	70	5	12	17	11	33
Kris Russell	72	3	13	16	5	27
Drake Caggiula^{‡}	29	7	4	11	−8	16
Ty Rattie	50	4	7	11	−2	4
Tobias Rieder	67	0	11	11	−8	8
Sam Gagner^{†}	25	5	5	10	−3	10
Kyle Brodziak	70	6	3	9	−14	33
Jesse Puljujarvi	46	4	5	9	−14	16
Caleb Jones	17	1	5	6	−9	6
Josh Currie	21	2	3	5	2	2
Andrej Sekera	24	0	4	4	3	6
Colby Cave^{†}	33	2	1	3	−4	8
Ryan Spooner^{†‡}	25	2	1	3	−6	2
Kevin Gravel	36	0	3	3	−2	4
Joseph Gambardella	15	0	3	3	2	2
Ryan Strome^{‡}	18	1	1	2	−1	14
Kailer Yamamoto	17	1	1	2	−6	2
Chris Wideman^{†‡}	5	0	2	2	−2	4
Jason Garrison^{‡}	17	1	0	1	1	8
Brandon Manning^{†}	12	1	0	1	−1	4
Evan Bouchard	7	1	0	1	−5	2
Alex Petrovic^{†}	9	0	1	1	−7	2
Brad Malone	16	0	0	0	0	4
Patrick Russell	6	0	0	0	0	2
Valentin Zykov^{†‡}	5	0	0	0	−1	2
Cooper Marody	6	0	0	0	−1	0

=== Goaltenders ===
Regular season
Player	GP	GS	TOI	W	L	OT	GA	GAA	SA	SV%	SO	G	A	PIM
Mikko Koskinen	55	51	2,991:51	25	21	6	146	2.93	1,551	.906	4	0	2	2
Cam Talbot^{‡}	31	29	1,694:34	10	15	3	95	3.36	888	.893	1	0	1	0
Anthony Stolarz^{†}	6	2	238:41	0	2	0	15	3.77	145	.897	0	0	0	0

^{†}Denotes player spent time with another team before joining the Oilers. Stats reflect time with the Oilers only.
^{‡}Denotes player was traded mid-season. Stats reflect time with the Oilers only.
Bold/italics denotes franchise record.

== Awards and honours ==
=== Milestones ===
Regular season
Player	Milestone	Reached
Evan Bouchard	1st NHL game	October 6, 2018
Darnell Nurse	200th NHL game	October 13, 2018
Ryan Nugent-Hopkins	200th NHL assist	October 16, 2018
Kailer Yamamoto	1st NHL goal	October 18, 2018
Jujhar Khaira	100th NHL game	October 20, 2018
Cooper Marody	1st NHL game	October 23, 2018
Jesse Puljujarvi	100th NHL game	October 23, 2018
Evan Bouchard	1st NHL goal 1st NHL point	October 25, 2018
Mikko Koskinen	1st NHL shutout	November 1, 2018
Oscar Klefbom	100th NHL point	November 3, 2018
Milan Lucic	1,000th NHL PIM	November 6, 2018
Zack Kassian	400th NHL game	November 8, 2018
Patrick Russell	1st NHL game	November 17, 2018
Connor McDavid	100th NHL goal	November 20, 2018
Alex Chiasson	400th NHL Game	November 29, 2018
Ryan Spooner	300th NHL Game	December 9, 2018
Leon Draisaitl	300th NHL Game	December 11, 2018
Caleb Jones	1st NHL Game	December 14, 2018
Caleb Jones	1st NHL Assist; 1st NHL Point	December 18, 2018
Connor McDavid	200th NHL Assist; 300th NHL Point	December 22, 2018
Caleb Jones	1st NHL Goal	December 29, 2018
Chris Wideman	100th NHL PIM	December 29, 2018
Joseph Gambardella	1st NHL Game	December 31, 2018
Cam Talbot	20th NHL Shutout	January 6, 2019
Ryan Nugent-Hopkins	500th NHL Game	January 8, 2019
Matt Benning	100th NHL PIM	January 14, 2019
Mikko Koskinen	1st NHL Assist	January 14, 2019
Darnell Nurse	200th NHL PIM	January 16, 2019
Leon Draisaitl	100th NHL Goal	January 20, 2019
Leon Draisaitl	100th NHL PIM	February 3, 2019
Kevin Gravel	100th NHL Game	February 3, 2019
Jujhar Khaira	100th NHL PIM	February 5, 2019
Kyle Brodziak	900th NHL Game	February 16, 2019
Josh Currie	1st NHL Game	February 19, 2019
Josh Currie	1st NHL Goal; 1st NHL Point	February 23, 2019
Milan Lucic	300th NHL Assist	February 23, 2019
Josh Currie	1st NHL Assist	February 28, 2019
Oscar Klefbom	300th NHL Game	March 4, 2019
Zack Kassian	700th NHL PIM	March 16, 2019
Leon Draisaitl	300th NHL Point	March 21, 2019
Joseph Gambardella	1st NHL Assist; 1st NHL Point	March 21, 2019
Andrej Sekera	700th NHL Game	March 23, 2019
Ryan Nugent-Hopkins	3rd NHL Hat-trick	March 26, 2019
Leon Draisaitl	1st NHL Hat-trick	March 26, 2019
Adam Larsson	100th NHL Point	March 26, 2019
Matt Benning	200th NHL Game	March 28, 2019
Milan Lucic	500th NHL Point	March 30, 2019
Sam Gagner	800th NHL Game	April 2, 2019
Leon Draisaitl	50th Goal in 82nd Game	April 6, 2019

=== Records ===
- 9: An NHL record for most consecutive team goals a player has factored on to begin a season by Connor McDavid (4 goals, 5 assists) on October 16, 2018.

== Transactions ==
The Oilers have been involved in the following transactions during the 2018–19 season.

=== Trades ===
Date	Details		Ref
June 23, 2018	To Montreal Canadiens 3rd-round pick in 2018; 5th-round pick in 2018	To Edmonton Oilers WSH's 2nd-round pick in 2018	
June 24, 2018	To Montreal Canadiens 5th-round pick in 2019	To Edmonton Oilers Hayden Hawkey	
October 1, 2018	To St. Louis Blues Jakub Jerabek	To Edmonton Oilers Conditional 6th-round pick in 2020	
November 16, 2018	To New York Rangers Ryan Strome	To Edmonton Oilers Ryan Spooner	
November 22, 2018	To Ottawa Senators Conditional 6th-round pick in 2020	To Edmonton Oilers Chris Wideman	
December 30, 2018	To Chicago Blackhawks Drake Caggiula; Jason Garrison	To Edmonton Oilers Brandon Manning; Robin Norell	
December 30, 2018	To Florida Panthers Chris Wideman; Conditional 3rd-round pick in 2019	To Edmonton Oilers Alex Petrovic	
February 15, 2019	To Philadelphia Flyers Cam Talbot	To Edmonton Oilers Anthony Stolarz	
February 16, 2019	To Vancouver Canucks Ryan Spooner	To Edmonton Oilers Sam Gagner	

=== Free agents ===
Date	Player	Team	Contract term	Ref
July 1, 2018	Kyle Brodziak	from St. Louis Blues	2-year	
July 1, 2018	Laurent Brossoit	to Winnipeg Jets	1-year	
July 1, 2018	Kevin Gravel	from Los Angeles Kings	1-year	
July 1, 2018	Eric Gryba	to New Jersey Devils	1-year	
July 1, 2018	Tobias Rieder	from Los Angeles Kings	1-year	
July 1, 2018	Dillon Simpson	to Columbus Blue Jackets	1-year	
July 2, 2018	Yohann Auvitu	to Sochi (KHL)	2-year	
July 2, 2018	Joey LaLeggia	to St. Louis Blues	2-year	
July 2, 2018	Iiro Pakarinen	to Metallurg Magnitogorsk (KHL)	1-year	
July 2, 2018	Anton Slepyshev	to CSKA Moscow (KHL)	2-year	
July 18, 2018	Josh Currie	from Bakersfield Condors (AHL)	2-year	
July 24, 2018	Grayson Downing	to Colorado Eagles (AHL)	1-year	
July 24, 2018	Kyle Platzer	to Charlotte Checkers (AHL)	1-year	
August 20, 2018	Jakub Jerabek	from Washington Capitals	1-year	
September 13, 2018	Ben Betker	to Kalamazoo Wings (ECHL)	1-year	
October 2, 2018	Alex Chiasson	from Washington Capitals	1-year	
October 2, 2018	Jason Garrison	from Vegas Golden Knights	1-year	
May 21, 2019	Logan Day	from Bakersfield Condors (AHL)	1-year	
May 24, 2019	Joakim Nygård	from Färjestad BK (SHL)	1-year	

=== Waivers ===
Date	Player	Team	Ref
October 1, 2018	Pontus Aberg	to Anaheim Ducks	
November 30, 2018	Valentin Zykov	from Carolina Hurricanes	
December 29, 2018	Valentin Zykov	to Vegas Golden Knights	
January 15, 2019	Colby Cave	from Boston Bruins	

=== Contract terminations ===
Date	Player	Via	Ref
June 21, 2018	Eric Gryba	Buyout	

=== Retirement ===
Date	Player	Ref

=== Signings ===
Date	Player	Contract term	Ref
July 6, 2018	Ryan Strome	2-year	
July 17, 2018	Evan Bouchard	3-year	
September 17, 2018	Darnell Nurse	2-year	
January 21, 2019	Mikko Koskinen	3-year	
May 1, 2019	Ryan McLeod	3-year	
May 22, 2019	Olivier Rodrigue	3-year	
May 29, 2019	Joe Gambardella	2-year	
June 3, 2019	Brad Malone	1-year	
June 3, 2019	Shane Starrett	1-year	
June 11, 2019	Patrick Russell	1-year	

== Draft picks ==
Below are the Edmonton Oilers' selections at the 2018 NHL entry draft, which was held on June 22 and 23, 2018, at the American Airlines Center in Dallas, Texas.

Round	#	Player	Pos	Nationality	College/junior/club team (league)
1	10	Evan Bouchard	D	Canada	London Knights (OHL)
2	40	Ryan McLeod	C	Canada	Mississauga Steelheads (OHL)
2	62^{1}	Olivier Rodrigue	G	Canada	Drummondville Voltigeurs (QMJHL)
6	164	Michael Kesselring	D	United States	New Hampton School (USHS)
7	195	Patrik Siikanen	C	Finland	Blues U20 (Nuorten SM-liiga)

Notes:

1. The Washington Capitals' second-round pick went to the Edmonton Oilers as the result of a trade on June 23, 2018, that sent a third and fifth-round pick both in 2018 (71st and 133rd overall) to Montreal in exchange for this pick.
