= 2018–19 Carolina Hurricanes season =

40th season for the National Hockey League's Hurricanes

2018–19 Carolina Hurricanes
- Division: 4th Metropolitan
- Conference: 7th Eastern
- 2018–19 record: 46–29–7
- Home record: 24–13–4
- Road record: 22–16–3
- Goals for: 245
- Goals against: 223

Team information
- General manager: Don Waddell
- Coach: Rod Brind'Amour
- Captain: Justin Williams
- Alternate captains: Justin Faulk; Jordan Staal
- Arena: PNC Arena
- Average attendance: 14,322
- Minor league affiliates: Charlotte Checkers (AHL); Florida Everblades (ECHL)

Team leaders
- Goals: Sebastian Aho (30)
- Assists: Teuvo Teravainen (55)
- Points: Sebastian Aho (83)
- Penalty minutes: Andrei Svechnikov (62)
- Plus/minus: Brett Pesce (+35)
- Wins: Petr Mrazek (23)
- Goals against average: Alex Nedeljkovic (2.00)

The 2018–19 Carolina Hurricanes season was the 40th season for the National Hockey League (NHL) franchise that was established on June 22, 1979 (following seven seasons of play in the World Hockey Association), and 21st season since the franchise relocated from Hartford to start the 1997–98 NHL season. For the first time since 2009, the Hurricanes reached the playoffs, clinching a playoff berth with a 3–1 win against the New Jersey Devils on April 4, 2019. In the playoffs the Hurricanes reached the Conference Finals where they were swept by the Boston Bruins.

== Standings ==
Metropolitan Division
Pos	Team	GP	W	L	OTL	ROW	GF	GA	GD	Pts
1	y – Washington Capitals	82	48	26	8	44	278	249	+29	104
2	x – New York Islanders	82	48	27	7	43	228	196	+32	103
3	x – Pittsburgh Penguins	82	44	26	12	42	273	241	+32	100
4	x – Carolina Hurricanes	82	46	29	7	44	245	223	+22	99
5	x – Columbus Blue Jackets	82	47	31	4	45	258	232	+26	98
6	Philadelphia Flyers	82	37	37	8	34	244	281	−37	82
7	New York Rangers	82	32	36	14	26	227	272	−45	78
8	New Jersey Devils	82	31	41	10	28	222	275	−53	72

Source: National Hockey League
x – Clinched playoff spot; y – Clinched division

Eastern Conference Wild Card
Pos	Div	Team	GP	W	L	OTL	ROW	GF	GA	GD	Pts
1	ME	x – Carolina Hurricanes	82	46	29	7	44	245	223	+22	99
2	ME	x – Columbus Blue Jackets	82	47	31	4	45	258	232	+26	98
3	AT	Montreal Canadiens	82	44	30	8	41	249	236	+13	96
4	AT	Florida Panthers	82	36	32	14	33	267	280	−13	86
5	ME	Philadelphia Flyers	82	37	37	8	34	244	281	−37	82
6	ME	New York Rangers	82	32	36	14	26	227	272	−45	78
7	AT	Buffalo Sabres	82	33	39	10	28	226	271	−45	76
8	AT	Detroit Red Wings	82	32	40	10	29	227	277	−50	74
9	ME	New Jersey Devils	82	31	41	10	28	222	275	−53	72
10	AT	Ottawa Senators	82	29	47	6	29	242	302	−60	64

Source: National Hockey League
x – Clinched playoff spot

== Schedule and results ==
=== Preseason ===
The preseason schedule was published on June 12, 2018.

2018 preseason game log: 5–0–1 (Home: 2–0–1; Road: 3–0–0)
#	Date	Visitor	Score	Home	OT	Decision	Attendance	Record	Recap
1	September 18	Carolina	4–1	Tampa Bay		Mrazek	12,454	1–0–0	Recap
2	September 19	Tampa Bay	1–6	Carolina		Booth	6,007	2–0–0	Recap
3	September 21	Washington	1–5	Carolina		Mrazek	8,364	3–0–0	Recap
4	September 25	Carolina	4–1	Nashville		Darling	17,188	4–0–0	Recap
5	September 28	Carolina	5–4	Washington	OT	Mrazek	15,304	5–0–0	Recap
6	September 30	Nashville	5–4	Carolina	OT	Mrazek	18,640	5–0–1	Recap

=== Regular season ===
The regular season schedule was released on June 21, 2018.

2018–19 game log

October: 6–5–1 (Home: 3–3–1; Road: 3–2–0)
#	Date	Visitor	Score	Home	OT	Decision	Attendance	Record	Pts	Recap
1	October 4	NY Islanders	2–1	Carolina	OT	Mrazek	18,680	0–0–1	1	Recap
2	October 5	Carolina	3–1	Columbus		McElhinney	18,306	1–0–1	3	Recap
3	October 7	NY Rangers	5–8	Carolina		Mrazek	13,526	2–0–1	5	Recap
4	October 9	Vancouver	3–5	Carolina		McElhinney	11,932	3–0–1	7	Recap
5	October 13	Carolina	5–4	Minnesota	OT	McElhinney	18,715	4–0–1	9	Recap
6	October 14	Carolina	1–3	Winnipeg		Mrazek	15,321	4–1–1	9	Recap
7	October 16	Carolina	2–4	Tampa Bay		Mrazek	19,092	4–2–1	9	Recap
8	October 20	Colorado	3–1	Carolina		McElhinney	11,753	4–3–1	9	Recap
9	October 22	Carolina	3–1	Detroit		Mrazek	19,515	5–3–1	11	Recap
10	October 26	San Jose	3–4	Carolina	SO	Mrazek	12,311	6–3–1	13	Recap
11	October 28	NY Islanders	2–1	Carolina		Mrazek	10,367	6–4–1	13	Recap
12	October 30	Boston	3–2	Carolina		Darling	11,357	6–5–1	13	Recap

November: 6–4–3 (Home: 4–1–2; Road: 2–3–1)
#	Date	Visitor	Score	Home	OT	Decision	Attendance	Record	Pts	Recap
13	November 2	Carolina	3–4	Arizona	OT	Mrazek	10,562	6–5–2	14	Recap
14	November 3	Carolina	0–3	Vegas		Darling	18,328	6–6–2	14	Recap
15	November 6	Carolina	1–4	St. Louis		McElhinney	16,210	6–7–2	14	Recap
16	November 8	Carolina	4–3	Chicago		Darling	21,331	7–7–2	16	Recap
17	November 10	Detroit	4–3	Carolina	SO	Darling	13,029	7–7–3	17	Recap
18	November 12	Chicago	2–3	Carolina	OT	Darling	11,221	8–7–3	19	Recap
19	November 17	Columbus	4–1	Carolina		Darling	13,040	8–8–3	19	Recap
20	November 18	New Jersey	1–2	Carolina		McElhinney	11,211	9–8–3	21	Recap
21	November 21	Toronto	2–5	Carolina		McElhinney	12,562	10–8–3	23	Recap
22	November 23	Florida	1–4	Carolina		McElhinney	13,226	11–8–3	25	Recap
23	November 24	Carolina	1–4	NY Islanders		Darling	10,015	11–9–3	25	Recap
24	November 27	Carolina	2–1	Montreal		McElhinney	20,835	12–9–3	27	Recap
25	November 30	Anaheim	2–1	Carolina	OT	McElhinney	13,987	12–9–4	28	Recap

December: 4–8–1 (Home: 3–3–1; Road: 1–5–0)
#	Date	Visitor	Score	Home	OT	Decision	Attendance	Record	Pts	Recap
26	December 2	Carolina	0–2	Los Angeles		Mrazek	17,546	12–10–4	28	Recap
27	December 5	Carolina	1–5	San Jose		McElhinney	17,119	12–11–4	28	Recap
28	December 7	Carolina	4–1	Anaheim		Mrazek	15,573	13–11–4	30	Recap
29	December 11	Toronto	4–1	Carolina		Mrazek	11,907	13–12–4	30	Recap
30	December 13	Carolina	4–6	Montreal		Mrazek	20,407	13–13–4	30	Recap
31	December 14	Washington	6–5	Carolina	SO	Darling	14,446	13–13–5	31	Recap
32	December 16	Arizona	0–3	Carolina		Mrazek	13,051	14–13–5	33	Recap
33	December 20	Detroit	4–1	Carolina		Mrazek	13,548	14–14–5	33	Recap
34	December 22	Pittsburgh	3–0	Carolina		McElhinney	16,264	14–15–5	33	Recap
35	December 23	Boston	3–5	Carolina		Mrazek	17,409	15–15–5	35	Recap
36	December 27	Carolina	1–3	Washington		Mrazek	18,506	15–16–5	35	Recap
37	December 29	Carolina	0–2	New Jersey		McElhinney	16,514	15–17–5	35	Recap
38	December 31	Philadelphia	1–3	Carolina		McElhinney	16,644	16–17–5	37	Recap

January: 8–3–1 (Home: 3–1–0; Road: 5–2–1)
#	Date	Visitor	Score	Home	OT	Decision	Attendance	Record	Pts	Recap
39	January 3	Carolina	5–3	Philadelphia		Mrazek	18,718	17–17–5	39	Recap
40	January 4	Columbus	2–4	Carolina		McElhinney	15,346	18–17–5	41	Recap
41	January 6	Carolina	5–4	Ottawa		Mrazek	12,924	19–17–5	43	Recap
42	January 8	Carolina	4–3	NY Islanders		McElhinney	13,769	20–17–5	45	Recap
43	January 10	Carolina	1–3	Tampa Bay		Mrazek	19,092	20–18–5	45	Recap
44	January 11	Buffalo	3–4	Carolina		McElhinney	17,199	21–18–5	47	Recap
45	January 13	Nashville	3–6	Carolina		Mrazek	16,347	22–18–5	49	Recap
46	January 15	Carolina	2–6	NY Rangers		McElhinney	17,636	22–19–5	49	Recap
47	January 18	Ottawa	4–1	Carolina		Mrazek	15,598	22–20–5	49	Recap
48	January 20	Carolina	7–4	Edmonton		Mrazek	18,347	23–20–5	51	Recap
49	January 22	Carolina	2–3	Calgary	OT	Mrazek	18,508	23–20–6	52	Recap
50	January 23	Carolina	5–2	Vancouver		Nedeljkovic	18,373	24–20–6	54	Recap

February: 10–3–0 (Home: 4–2–0; Road: 6–1–0)
#	Date	Visitor	Score	Home	OT	Decision	Attendance	Record	Pts	Recap
51	February 1	Vegas	2–5	Carolina		Mrazek	17,104	25–20–6	56	Recap
52	February 3	Calgary	4–3	Carolina		Mrazek	12,621	25–21–6	56	Recap
53	February 5	Carolina	4–0	Pittsburgh		McElhinney	18,435	26–21–6	58	Recap
54	February 7	Carolina	6–5	Buffalo	OT	McElhinney	17,588	27–21–6	60	Recap
55	February 8	Carolina	3–0	NY Rangers		Mrazek	18,006	28–21–6	62	Recap
56	February 10	Carolina	2–3	New Jersey		Mrazek	16,514	28–22–6	62	Recap
57	February 12	Carolina	4–1	Ottawa		McElhinney	10,648	29–22–6	64	Recap
58	February 15	Edmonton	1–3	Carolina		McElhinney	14,430	30–22–6	66	Recap
59	February 16	Dallas	0–3	Carolina		Mrazek	14,369	31–22–6	68	Recap
60	February 19	NY Rangers	2–1	Carolina		McElhinney	13,343	31–23–6	68	Recap
61	February 21	Carolina	4–3	Florida		Mrazek	10,750	32–23–6	70	Recap
62	February 23	Carolina	3–0	Dallas		McElhinney	18,532	33–23–6	72	Recap
63	February 26	Los Angeles	1–6	Carolina		Mrazek	13,042	34–23–6	74	Recap

March: 9–6–1 (Home: 6–3–0; Road: 3–3–1)
#	Date	Visitor	Score	Home	OT	Decision	Attendance	Record	Pts	Recap
64	March 1	St. Louis	2–5	Carolina		McElhinney	15,363	35–23–6	76	Recap
65	March 2	Carolina	4–3	Florida	OT	Mrazek	13,923	36–23–6	78	Recap
66	March 5	Carolina	3–4	Boston	OT	McElhinney	17,565	36–23–7	79	Recap
67	March 8	Winnipeg	8–1	Carolina		McElhinney	15,928	36–24–7	79	Recap
68	March 9	Carolina	5–3	Nashville		Mrazek	17,724	37–24–7	81	Recap
69	March 11	Carolina	3–0	Colorado		Mrazek	16,711	38–24–7	83	Recap
70	March 15	Carolina	0–3	Columbus		Mrazek	18,832	38–25–7	83	Recap
71	March 16	Buffalo	2–4	Carolina		McElhinney	15,171	39–25–7	85	Recap
72	March 19	Pittsburgh	2–3	Carolina	SO	Mrazek	14,677	40–25–7	87	Recap
73	March 21	Tampa Bay	6–3	Carolina		McElhinney	13,785	40–26–7	87	Recap
74	March 23	Minnesota	1–5	Carolina		Mrazek	16,751	41–26–7	89	Recap
75	March 24	Montreal	1–2	Carolina	OT	McElhinney	14,437	42–26–7	91	Recap
76	March 26	Carolina	1–4	Washington		Mrazek	18,506	42–27–7	91	Recap
77	March 28	Washington	3–2	Carolina		McElhinney	14,680	42–28–7	91	Recap
78	March 30	Philadelphia	2–5	Carolina		Mrazek	17,833	43–28–7	93	Recap
79	March 31	Carolina	1–3	Pittsburgh		McElhinney	18,616	43–29–7	93	Recap

April: 3–0–0 (Home: 1–0–0; Road: 2–0–0)
#	Date	Visitor	Score	Home	OT	Decision	Attendance	Record	Pts	Recap
80	April 2	Carolina	4–1	Toronto		Mrazek	19,097	44–29–7	95	Recap
81	April 4	New Jersey	1–3	Carolina		Mrazek	17,645	45–29–7	97	Recap
82	April 6	Carolina	4–3	Philadelphia		McElhinney	19,433	46–29–7	99	Recap

Legend: Win (2 points) Loss (0 points) Overtime/shootout loss (1 point)

=== Detailed records ===
Updated as of April 6, 2019

Eastern Conference
Atlantic	GP	W	L	OT	SHOTS	GF	GA	PP	PK	FO W–L
Boston Bruins	3	1	1	1	118–99	10	10	2–12	3–11	102–107
Buffalo Sabres	3	3	0	0	89–109	14	10	1–6	1–8	83–104
Detroit Red Wings	3	1	1	1	130–77	7	9	3–10	1–7	95–101
Florida Panthers	3	3	0	0	90–99	12	7	3–11	2–8	84–99
Montreal Canadiens	3	2	1	0	93–118	8	8	0–5	0–10	96–98
Ottawa Senators	3	2	1	0	100–83	10	9	4–8	1–7	67–89
Tampa Bay Lightning	3	0	3	0	95–89	6	13	0–11	5–12	82–133
Toronto Maple Leafs	3	2	1	0	112–85	10	7	3–7	1–9	84–95
Division total	24	14	8	2	827–759	77	73	16–70	14–72	693–826

Metropolitan	GP	W	L	OT	SHOTS	GF	GA	PP	PK	FO W–L
Carolina Hurricanes										
Columbus Blue Jackets	4	2	2	0	143–100	8	10	0–8	1–10	104–114
New Jersey Devils	4	2	2	0	122–122	7	7	2–15	1–13	121–130
New York Islanders	4	1	2	1	136–90	7	11	2–11	2–11	126–98
New York Rangers	4	2	2	0	153–105	14	13	1–11	4–13	118–101
Philadelphia Flyers	4	4	0	0	121–123	17	9	4–10	4–12	118–134
Pittsburgh Penguins	4	2	2	0	174–146	12	12	1–10	0–6	126–123
Washington Capitals	4	0	3	1	110–110	9	16	3–11	2–9	125–112
Division total	28	13	13	2	959–796	74	78	13–76	14–74	838–802
Conference total	52	27	21	4	1786–1555	151	151	29–146	28–146	1531–1628

Western Conference
Central	GP	W	L	OT	SHOTS	GF	GA	PP	PK	FO W–L
Chicago Blackhawks	2	2	0	0	74–73	7	5	3–4	0–2	56–46
Colorado Avalanche	2	1	1	0	76–60	4	3	0–6	1–7	69–45
Dallas Stars	2	2	0	0	58–57	6	0	2–4	0–5	43–72
Minnesota Wild	2	2	0	0	90–48	10	5	1–11	3–9	63–71
Nashville Predators	2	2	0	0	66–57	11	6	4–10	0–8	43–64
St. Louis Blues	2	1	1	0	63–43	6	6	1–7	1–7	60–61
Winnipeg Jets	2	0	2	0	72–55	2	11	0–5	2–4	65–66
Division total	14	10	4	0	499–393	46	36	11–47	7–42	409–425

Pacific	GP	W	L	OT	SHOTS	GF	GA	PP	PK	FO W–L
Anaheim Ducks	2	1	0	1	70–48	5	3	0–10	0–8	57–61
Arizona Coyotes	2	1	0	1	78–48	6	4	0–11	1–5	65–54
Calgary Flames	2	0	1	1	72–57	5	7	0–6	1–9	55–73
Edmonton Oilers	2	2	0	0	61–62	10	5	1–3	1–7	71–53
Los Angeles Kings	2	1	1	0	68–58	6	3	1–5	0–5	62–67
San Jose Sharks	2	1	1	0	81–46	5	8	1–5	3–5	79–58
Vancouver Canucks	2	2	0	0	67–51	10	5	1–8	2–6	62–72
Vegas Golden Knights	2	1	1	0	66–50	5	5	0–6	1–6	55–61
Division total	16	9	4	3	563–420	52	40	4–54	9–51	506–499
Conference total	30	19	8	3	1062–813	98	76	15–101	16–93	915–924
NHL total	82	46	29	7	2848–2367	249	227	43–247	44–239	2446–2548

=== Playoffs ===
The Hurricanes faced the Washington Capitals in the First Round of the playoffs, and defeated them in seven games.

The Hurricanes faced the New York Islanders in the Second Round of the playoffs, sweeping them in four games, which was the first best-of-seven series sweep in Hurricanes/Whalers franchise history.

The Hurricanes faced the Boston Bruins in the Conference Finals, and were swept in four games. They played against each other in the 2009 Stanley Cup playoffs, where the Hurricanes defeated the Bruins in the Conference Semifinals in seven games.

2019 Stanley Cup playoffs

Eastern Conference First Round vs. (M1) Washington Capitals: Carolina won 4–3
#	Date	Visitor	Score	Home	OT	Decision	Attendance	Series	Recap
1	April 11	Carolina	2–4	Washington		Mrazek	18,506	0–1	Recap
2	April 13	Carolina	3–4	Washington	OT	Mrazek	18,506	0–2	Recap
3	April 15	Washington	0–5	Carolina		Mrazek	18,783	1–2	Recap
4	April 18	Washington	1–2	Carolina		Mrazek	19,202	2–2	Recap
5	April 20	Carolina	0–6	Washington		Mrazek	18,506	2–3	Recap
6	April 22	Washington	2–5	Carolina		Mrazek	18,913	3–3	Recap
7	April 24	Carolina	4–3	Washington	2OT	Mrazek	18,506	4–3	Recap

Eastern Conference Second Round vs. (M2) New York Islanders: Carolina won 4–0
#	Date	Visitor	Score	Home	OT	Decision	Attendance	Series	Recap
1	April 26	Carolina	1–0	NY Islanders	OT	Mrazek	15,795	1–0	Recap
2	April 28	Carolina	2–1	NY Islanders		McElhinney	15,795	2–0	Recap
3	May 1	NY Islanders	2–5	Carolina		McElhinney	19,066	3–0	Recap
4	May 3	NY Islanders	2–5	Carolina		McElhinney	19,495	4–0	Recap

Eastern Conference Finals vs. (A2) Boston Bruins: Boston won 4–0
#	Date	Visitor	Score	Home	OT	Decision	Attendance	Series	Recap
1	May 9	Carolina	2–5	Boston		Mrazek	17,565	0–1	Recap
2	May 12	Carolina	2–6	Boston		Mrazek	17,565	0–2	Recap
3	May 14	Boston	2–1	Carolina		McElhinney	18,768	0–3	Recap
4	May 16	Boston	4–0	Carolina		McElhinney	19,041	0–4	Recap

Legend: Win Loss

== Player statistics ==
As of May 16, 2019

=== Skaters ===
Regular season
Player	GP	G	A	Pts	+/−	PIM
Sebastian Aho	82	30	53	83	25	26
Teuvo Teravainen	82	21	55	76	30	12
Justin Williams	82	23	30	53	−4	44
Micheal Ferland	71	17	23	40	13	58
Dougie Hamilton	82	18	21	39	0	54
Andrei Svechnikov	82	20	17	37	0	62
Justin Faulk	82	11	24	35	9	47
Jaccob Slavin	82	8	23	31	0	18
Nino Niederreiter^{†}	36	14	16	30	7	20
Brett Pesce	73	7	22	29	35	24
Jordan Staal	50	11	17	28	6	26
Lucas Wallmark	81	10	18	28	−8	36
Brock McGinn	82	10	16	26	10	20
Jordan Martinook	82	15	10	25	1	38
Warren Foegele	77	10	5	15	−17	20
Trevor van Riemsdyk	78	3	11	14	−4	10
Calvin de Haan	74	1	13	14	1	20
Greg McKegg	41	6	5	11	−2	8
Saku Maenalanen	34	4	4	8	0	20
Victor Rask^{‡}	26	1	5	6	–3	4
Phillip Di Giuseppe^{‡}	21	1	3	4	–2	8
Clark Bishop	20	1	2	3	–3	6
Valentin Zykov^{‡}	13	0	3	3	−1	0
Martin Necas	7	1	1	2	0	2
Haydn Fleury	20	0	1	1	4	2
Nicolas Roy	6	0	0	0	0	2
Janne Kuokkanen	7	0	0	0	–2	4
Trevor Carrick	1	0	0	0	−1	5
Jake Bean	2	0	0	0	0	2

Playoffs
Player	GP	G	A	Pts	+/−	PIM
Sebastian Aho	15	5	7	12	3	2
Jaccob Slavin	15	0	11	11	5	0
Teuvo Teravainen	15	7	3	10	6	2
Jordan Staal	15	4	6	10	7	8
Warren Foegele	15	5	4	9	6	6
Justin Faulk	15	1	7	8	4	4
Justin Williams	15	4	3	7	1	18
Dougie Hamilton	15	3	4	7	3	10
Brock McGinn	15	2	4	6	–1	6
Brett Pesce	15	0	6	6	4	0
Andrei Svechnikov	9	3	2	5	0	9
Lucas Wallmark	15	1	4	5	0	6
Nino Niederreiter	15	1	3	4	0	12
Jordan Martinook	10	0	4	4	0	6
Greg McKegg	14	2	0	2	1	4
Calvin de Haan	12	1	0	1	3	2
Saku Maenalanen	9	0	1	1	1	6
Micheal Ferland	7	0	1	1	−3	18
Clark Bishop	2	0	0	0	0	0
Aleksi Saarela	1	0	0	0	0	0
Haydn Fleury	9	0	0	0	1	2
Patrick Brown	8	0	0	0	0	0
Trevor van Riemsdyk	9	0	0	0	0	2

=== Goaltenders ===
Regular season
Player	GP	GS	TOI	W	L	OT	GA	GAA	SA	SV%	SO	G	A	PIM
Petr Mrazek	40	40	2,386:51	23	14	3	95	2.39	1,104	.914	4	0	1	6
Curtis McElhinney	33	33	1,977:31	20	11	2	85	2.58	968	.912	2	0	0	0
Scott Darling	8	8	485:34	2	4	2	27	3.34	233	.884	0	0	0	0
Alex Nedeljkovic	1	1	60:00	1	0	0	2	2.00	26	.923	0	0	0	0

Playoffs
Player	GP	GS	TOI	W	L	GA	GAA	SA	SV%	SO	G	A	PIM
Petr Mrazek	11	11	659:43	5	5	30	2.73	282	.894	2	0	0	0
Curtis McElhinney	5	4	268:25	3	2	9	2.01	128	.930	0	0	0	0

^{†}Denotes player spent time with another team before joining the Hurricanes. Stats reflect time with the Hurricanes only.
^{‡}Denotes player was traded mid-season. Stats reflect time with the Hurricanes only.
Bold/italics denotes franchise record.

== Transactions ==
The Hurricanes have been involved in the following transactions during the 2018–19 season.

=== Trades ===
Date	Details		Ref
June 23, 2018	To New York Rangers VGK's 7th-round pick in 2018	To Carolina Hurricanes BOS' 7th-round pick in 2019	
June 23, 2018	To Calgary Flames Noah Hanifin; Elias Lindholm	To Carolina Hurricanes Dougie Hamilton; Micheal Ferland; Adam Fox	
August 2, 2018	To Buffalo Sabres Jeff Skinner	To Carolina Hurricanes Cliff Pu; 2nd-round pick in 2019; 3rd-round pick in 2020; 6th-round pick in 2020	
January 17, 2019	To Minnesota Wild Victor Rask	To Carolina Hurricanes Nino Niederreiter	
February 25, 2019	To Florida Panthers Cliff Pu	To Carolina Hurricanes Future considerations	
April 30, 2019	To New York Rangers Adam Fox	To Carolina Hurricanes 2nd-round pick in 2019; Conditional 3rd-round pick in 2020	

=== Free agents ===
Date	Player	Team	Contract term	Ref
July 1, 2018	Jake Chelios	to Detroit Red Wings	1-year	
July 1, 2018	Petr Mrazek	from Philadelphia Flyers	1-year	
July 1, 2018	Joakim Nordstrom	to Boston Bruins	2-year	
July 1, 2018	Derek Ryan	to Calgary Flames	3-year	
July 1, 2018	Cam Ward	to Chicago Blackhawks	1-year	
July 2, 2018	Dan Renouf	from Detroit Red Wings	1-year	
July 3, 2018	Calvin de Haan	from New York Islanders	4-year	
July 9, 2018	Jeremy Smith	to Bridgeport Sound Tigers (AHL)	Unknown	
August 9, 2018	Keegan Kanzig	to Idaho Steelheads (ECHL)	1-year	
September 11, 2018	Tyler Ganly	to Kalamazoo Wings (ECHL)	1-year	
September 27, 2018	Michal Cajkovsky	from Avtomobilist Yekaterinburg (KHL)	1-year	
October 10, 2018	Brenden Kichton	to SaiPa (Liiga)	Unknown	
April 17, 2019	Jacob Pritchard	from UMass Minutemen (Hockey East)	1-year	

=== Waivers ===
Date	Player	Team	Ref
October 2, 2018	Curtis McElhinney	from Toronto Maple Leafs	
November 30, 2018	Valentin Zykov	to Edmonton Oilers	
January 1, 2019	Phillip Di Giuseppe	to Nashville Predators	

=== Contract terminations ===
Date	Player	Via	Ref
October 20, 2018	Michael Fora	Mutual termination	
December 29, 2018	Michal Cajkovsky	Mutual termination	

=== Retirement ===
Date	Player	Ref

=== Signings ===
Date	Player	Contract term	Ref
June 26, 2018	Phillip Di Giuseppe	1-year	
June 29, 2018	Valentin Zykov	2-year	
June 30, 2018	Andrei Svechnikov	3-year	
July 5, 2018	Trevor van Riemsdyk	2-year	
July 12, 2018	Greg McKegg	1-year	
July 12, 2018	Lucas Wallmark	2-year	
January 21, 2019	Teuvo Teravainen	5-year	
March 21, 2019	Stelio Mattheos	3-year	
May 28, 2019	Jesper Sellgren	3-year	

== Draft picks ==
Below are the Carolina Hurricanes' selections at the 2018 NHL entry draft, which was held on June 22 and 23, 2018, at the American Airlines Center in Dallas, Texas.

Round	#	Player	Pos	Nationality	College/Junior/Club team (League)
1	2	Andrei Svechnikov	RW	Russia	Barrie Colts (OHL)
2	42	Jack Drury	C	United States	Waterloo Black Hawks (USHL)
4	96^{1}	Luke Henman	C	Canada	Blainville-Boisbriand Armada (QMJHL)
4	104	Lenni Killinen	RW	Finland	Blues U20 (Nuorten SM-liiga)
6	166	Jesper Sellgren	D	Sweden	Modo Hockey (Allsvenskan)
7	197	Jake Kucharski	G	United States	Des Moines Buccaneers (USHL)

Notes:

1. The Arizona Coyotes' fourth-round pick went to the Carolina Hurricanes as the result of a trade on May 3, 2018, that sent Marcus Kruger and a third-round pick in 2018 to Arizona in exchange for Jordan Martinook and this pick.
