= Dylan DeMelo (ice hockey) =

Canadian ice hockey player (born 1993)

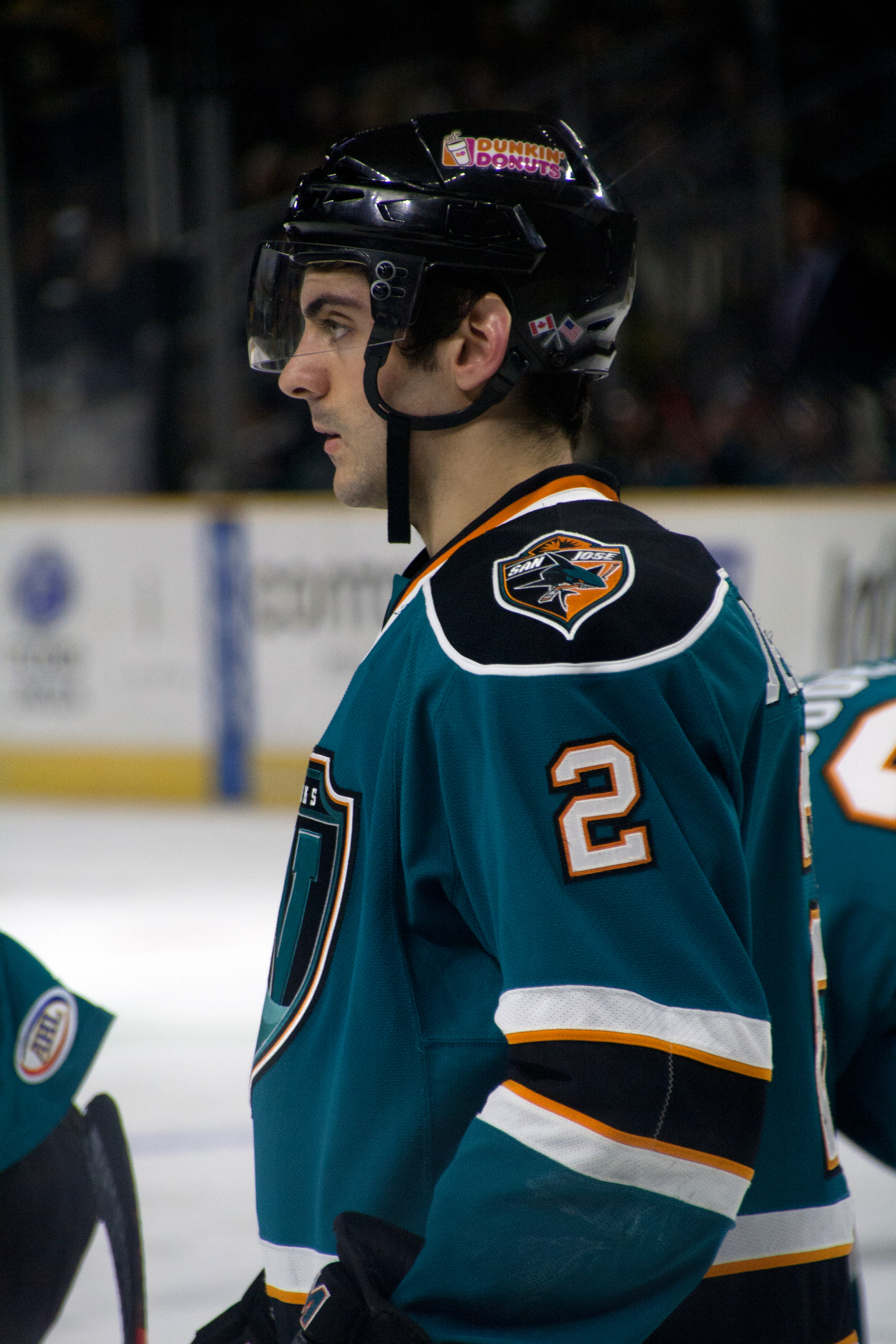
- DeMelo with the Worcester Sharks in 2015
- Born: May 1, 1993 (age 33) London, Ontario, Canada
- Height: 6 ft 1 in (185 cm)
- Weight: 195 lb (88 kg; 13 st 13 lb)
- Position: Defence
- Shoots: Right
- NHL team Former teams: Winnipeg Jets; San Jose Sharks; Ottawa Senators
- National team: Canada
- NHL draft: 179th overall, 2011; San Jose Sharks
- Playing career: 2012–present

Dylan DeMelo (born May 1, 1993) is a Canadian professional ice hockey player who is a defenceman for the Winnipeg Jets of the National Hockey League (NHL). DeMelo was selected by the San Jose Sharks in the sixth round, 179th overall, of the 2011 NHL entry draft.

== Playing career ==
=== Junior ===
DeMelo played four seasons (2009–13) of major junior hockey in the Ontario Hockey League (OHL) with the Mississauga St. Michael's Majors and Mississauga Steelheads, recording 25 goals and 125 points in 218 games.

DeMelo was Mississauga's nominee for both the Ivan Tennant Memorial Award and Bobby Smith Trophy for the 2010–11 season. Both trophies recognize academic excellence.

=== Professional ===
==== San Jose Sharks ====
DeMelo was selected 179th overall in the 2011 NHL entry draft by the San Jose Sharks and he signed an entry-level contract with the organization on April 20, 2012. He made his NHL debut with San Jose on October 17, 2015, in a game against the New York Islanders. DeMelo scored his first NHL goal against goaltender Roman Will on January 26, 2016, in a 6–1 San Jose victory over the Colorado Avalanche.

After completing his second full season with San Jose in 2017–18, DeMelo was an impending restricted free agent and was initially not tendered a qualifying offer by the Sharks. Despite the limited opportunity to explore free agency, DeMelo ultimately re-signed with the Sharks for two more years on July 7, 2018.

==== Ottawa Senators ====
DeMelo was involved in a blockbuster trade on September 13, 2018, as he was dealt by San Jose to the Ottawa Senators as part of a package including Rudolfs Balcers, Chris Tierney, Josh Norris, a conditional 2019 second-round draft pick and a conditional 2020 first-round draft pick, in exchange for Ottawa's captain and two-time Norris Trophy winner Erik Karlsson.

In his first season in Ottawa, DeMelo recorded 22 points in 77 games and was paired with the franchise's top defensive prospect Thomas Chabot. "I've been very pleased", he said of his debut season with the Senators, noting that the Ottawa coaching staff trusted him to play a top-four role, an opportunity he had never received in San Jose.

==== Winnipeg Jets ====
On February 18, 2020, DeMelo was traded by the Senators to the Winnipeg Jets in exchange for a 2020 third-round pick. At the time of the trade, he had recorded ten points in 49 games. He appeared in ten regular season games with the Jets before the season was paused due to the COVID-19 pandemic. Returning for the post-season, DeMelo led the club in short-handed ice time through four games in a qualifying series defeat to the Flames.

On October 7, 2020, DeMelo opted to forgo free agency and was signed to a four-year, $12 million contract with the Jets. Following the signing of his contract, DeMelo said his "first choice was Winnipeg" and he had unfinished business in the city.

In the 2023-24 NHL season, DeMelo marked a career high 31 points and a +46 rating, second-highest in the league that year. He once again forewent free agency to sign a four-year, $19.6 million contract extension with Winnipeg.

== Personal life ==
DeMelo is a Portuguese Canadian. In January 2021, DeMelo and his wife Jessica had their first child together.

== Career statistics ==
=== Regular season and playoffs ===
			Regular season					Playoffs
Season	Team	League	GP	G	A	Pts	PIM	GP	G	A	Pts	PIM
2009–10	Mississauga Chargers	OJHL	36	9	20	29	24	—	—	—	—	—
2009–10	Mississauga St. Michael's Majors	OHL	20	0	1	1	12	—	—	—	—	—
2010–11	Mississauga St. Michael's Majors	OHL	67	3	24	27	70	20	1	4	5	15
2011–12	Mississauga St. Michael's Majors	OHL	67	7	40	47	70	6	1	1	2	13
2011–12	Worcester Sharks	AHL	4	0	1	1	2	—	—	—	—	—
2012–13	Mississauga Steelheads	OHL	64	15	35	50	68	6	1	3	4	6
2012–13	Worcester Sharks	AHL	10	0	4	4	6	—	—	—	—	—
2013–14	Worcester Sharks	AHL	68	2	22	24	51	—	—	—	—	—
2014–15	Worcester Sharks	AHL	65	5	17	22	32	4	1	2	3	6
2015–16	San Jose Barracuda	AHL	15	0	6	6	2	—	—	—	—	—
2015–16	San Jose Sharks	NHL	45	2	2	4	14	—	—	—	—	—
2016–17	San Jose Sharks	NHL	25	1	7	8	14	—	—	—	—	—
2017–18	San Jose Sharks	NHL	63	0	20	20	34	10	0	1	1	4
2018–19	Ottawa Senators	NHL	77	4	18	22	32	—	—	—	—	—
2019–20	Ottawa Senators	NHL	49	0	10	10	31	—	—	—	—	—
2019–20	Winnipeg Jets	NHL	10	0	0	0	6	4	0	0	0	2
2020–21	Winnipeg Jets	NHL	56	0	9	9	20	5	0	0	0	2
2021–22	Winnipeg Jets	NHL	76	1	12	13	28	—	—	—	—	—
2022–23	Winnipeg Jets	NHL	75	6	21	27	50	5	0	2	2	6
2023–24	Winnipeg Jets	NHL	82	3	28	31	36	5	0	1	1	2
2024–25	Winnipeg Jets	NHL	82	3	16	19	38	12	1	3	4	10
2025–26	Winnipeg Jets	NHL	82	3	16	19	40	—	—	—	—	—
NHL totals			718	23	159	182	343	41	1	7	8	26

=== International ===
Year	Team	Event	Result	GP	G	A	Pts	PIM
2026	Canada	WC	4th	10	0	2	2	2
Senior totals				10	0	2	2	2
