= Chris Tierney (ice hockey) =

Canadian ice hockey player (born 1994)

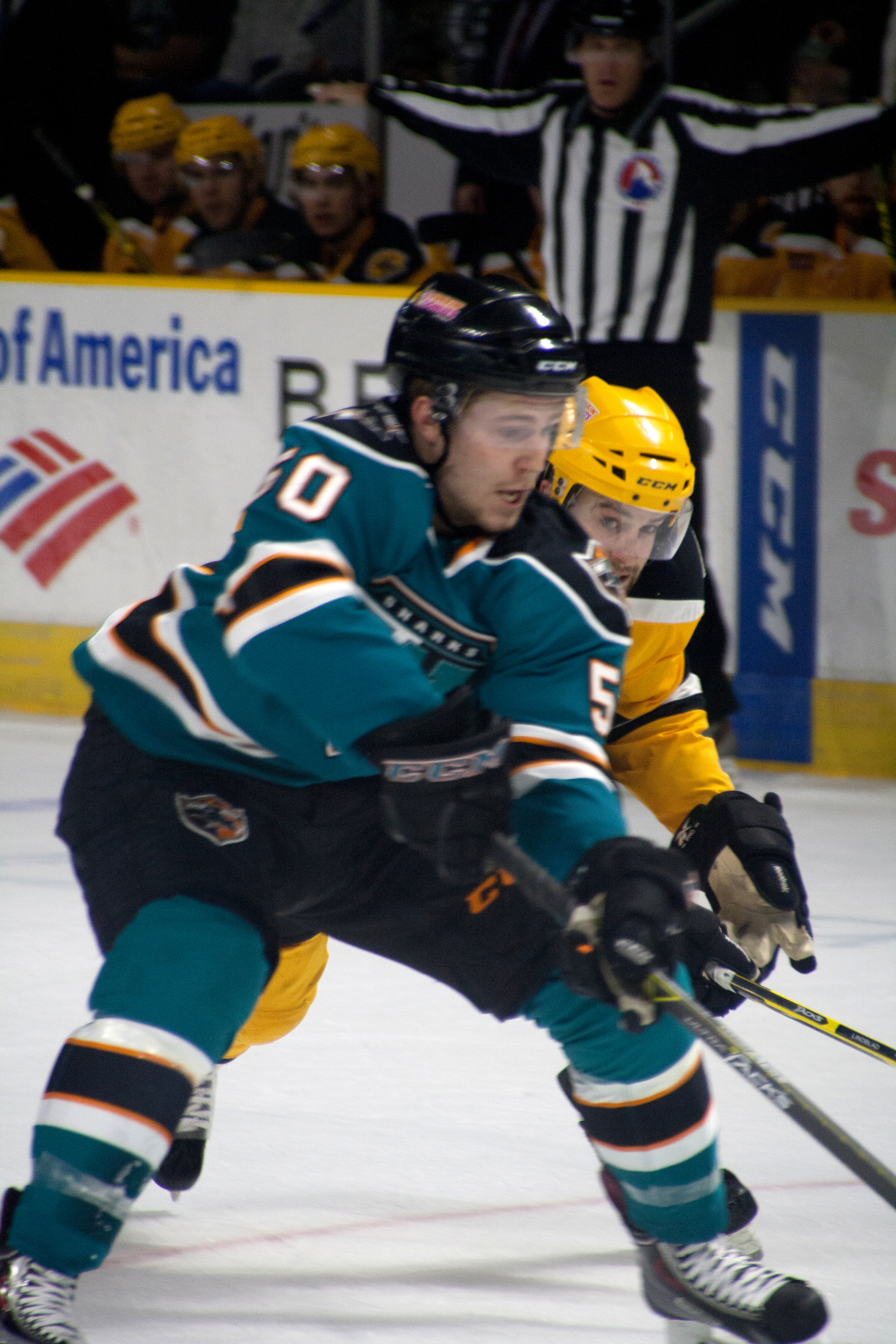
- Tierney with the Worcester Sharks in 2015
- Born: July 1, 1994 (age 32) Keswick, Ontario, Canada
- Height: 6 ft 1 in (185 cm)
- Weight: 195 lb (88 kg; 13 st 13 lb)
- Position: Centre
- Shoots: Left
- KHL team Former teams: Dinamo Minsk; San Jose Sharks; Ottawa Senators; Florida Panthers; Montreal Canadiens; New Jersey Devils; HC Ambrì-Piotta
- NHL draft: 55th overall, 2012; San Jose Sharks
- Playing career: 2014–present

Chris Tierney (born July 1, 1994) is a Canadian professional ice hockey centre who currently plays for HC Dinamo Minsk in the Kontinental Hockey League (KHL). He was selected in the second round, 55th overall, by the San Jose Sharks in the 2012 NHL entry draft. Tierney has also previously played for the New Jersey Devils, Florida Panthers, Montreal Canadiens and Ottawa Senators.

== Playing career ==
=== Junior ===
Tierney was selected by the London Knights in the first round, 19th overall in the Ontario Hockey League's (OHL) 2010 priority selection draft. Tierney began his major junior career during the 2010–11 season with the Knights, scoring 11 points in 47 games. In his second season, Tierney played on a line with Josh Anderson and Bo Horvat, scoring 11 goals and 34 points in 65 games. The Knights won the OHL's 2012 J. Ross Robertson Cup. They went on to play in the 2012 Memorial Cup, but were defeated in the final 2–1 by the Shawinigan Cataractes.

During the 2012–13 season, the Knights won the J. Ross Robertson Cup for a second time. Tierney finished the playoffs with 21 points in 21 games. The Knights lost in the semi-finals to the Portland Winterhawks during the Memorial Cup. Tierney concluded his major junior career during the 2013–14 season. In his final year with the Knights, he was named captain. The Knights made a third consecutive trip to the Memorial Cup, this time as hosts. The Knights finished last in the tournament. He finished his Knights' career with 191 points in 247 games.

=== Professional ===
Tierney was selected by the San Jose Sharks of the National Hockey League (NHL) in the second round, 55th overall, at the 2012 NHL entry draft. On April 2, 2013, the Sharks signed Tierney to a three-year, entry-level contract. Tierney turned professional during the 2014–15 season. He made the Sharks' opening night roster and recorded his first career point (an assist) in his debut on October 8. On February 5, 2015, Tierney scored his first career NHL goal in a 5–1 win over the Vancouver Canucks. Tierney also spent time with the Sharks' American Hockey League (AHL) affiliate, the Worcester Sharks.

Tierney spent the entirety of the 2015–16 season with the Sharks, appearing in 79 games. He also played in an additional 24 games during the 2016 Stanley Cup playoffs. The Sharks reached the Stanley Cup Finals, losing to the Pittsburgh Penguins in six games. The following season he played in 80 games with the Sharks, scoring 11 goals and 23 points.

On July 11, 2017, the Sharks signed Tierney to a one-year, one-way contract extension worth $735,000. During the 2017–18 season, Tierney led all Sharks in penalty killing time on ice. He registered 17 goals and 40 points in 82 games during the regular season and two points in ten playoff games. On July 18, 2018, Tierney signed a two-year contract extension with the Sharks. He was traded to the Ottawa Senators on September 13, 2018, as part of a package for defenceman Erik Karlsson.

He made his Senators debut during the 2018–19 season, in the season-opening 4–3 overtime loss to the Chicago Blackhawks on October 4. Tierney registered his first point with Ottawa, assisting on Colin White's first period power play goal. He scored his first goal for the Senators in the next game on October 6 against Frederik Andersen in a 5–3 victory over the Toronto Maple Leafs. On December 14, 2018, Tierney scored two goals in a 4–2 win over the Detroit Red Wings. During the pandemic-shortened 2019–20 season, Tierney finished sixth on the Senators in scoring, with 11 goals and 36 points in 71 games. On October 26, 2020, Tierney signed a two-year, $7 million contract extension with the Senators. In the 2021–22 season, Tierney scored two power play goals in a 3–2 win over the Dallas Stars on October 17, 2021.

Following the conclusion of his contract with the Senators, Tierney left as an unrestricted free agent and was signed to a one-year, two-way contract with the Florida Panthers on July 16, 2022. He was assigned by the Panthers to begin the 2022–23 season with AHL affiliate, the Charlotte Checkers, marking the first time he returned to the AHL since 2016. Tierney registered 16 points through 20 games with the Checkers, before earning recalls to the Panthers and featuring in 13 games for 3 points. He made his Panthers debut on December 6, 2012 and earned his first point, assisting on Zac Dalpe's third period goal in a 5–2 loss to the Winnipeg Jets. He scored his first goal as a Panther against Alex Nedeljkovic in his second game on December 8 in a 5–1 victory over the Detroit Red Wings. In February 2023, the Panthers placed Tierney on waivers and the Montreal Canadiens claimed him on February 23. Montreal claimed Tierney to help fill their lineup as a great number of players were injured. He made his Canadiens debut on February 24 and scored his first goal in a Montreal uniform against Carter Hart in a 5–2 victory over the Philadelphia Flyers. He finished the season in Montreal, having played 23 games, scoring one goal and seven points.

On July 14, 2023, Tierney signed a one-year, two-way contract with the New Jersey Devils. Tierney made his Devils debut on October 20 against the New York Islanders playing on a line with Nathan Bastian and Curtis Lazar. He registered his first point with the Devils, assisting on Luke Hughes' third period goal, in a 6–2 victory over the Ottawa Senators on December 29. He grabbed his first goal with the Devils on February 6, 2024 against Justus Annunen in a 5–3 victory over the Colorado Avalanche. He finished the season with 12 points in 52 games with the Devils.

On September 23, 2024, Tierney signed a one-year contract with HC Dinamo Minsk of the Kontinental Hockey League (KHL). In the 2024–25 season, Tierney in playing his first professional season abroad, contributed offensively with 10 goals and 20 points through 60 regular season games with Minsk. He increased his offensive output in the post-season, helping Minsk advance to the second round in collecting 8 points in 11 games.

On June 21, 2025, Tierney left the KHL and was signed to a one-year contract with an option for a second year with Swiss club, HC Ambrì-Piotta of the National League (NL).

== Personal life ==
Tierney is the son of Jim and Liz Tierney. He was born in Keswick, Ontario and has family in the Ottawa area. Tierney grew up an Atlanta Thrashers fan.

== Career statistics ==
			Regular season					Playoffs
Season	Team	League	GP	G	A	Pts	PIM	GP	G	A	Pts	PIM
2010–11	London Knights	OHL	47	3	8	11	12	4	0	1	1	0
2011–12	London Knights	OHL	65	11	23	34	20	19	5	2	7	4
2012–13	London Knights	OHL	68	18	39	57	12	21	6	15	21	6
2013–14	London Knights	OHL	67	40	49	89	12	9	6	11	17	0
2014–15	Worcester Sharks	AHL	29	8	21	29	10	4	1	2	3	0
2014–15	San Jose Sharks	NHL	43	6	15	21	6	—	—	—	—	—
2015–16	San Jose Sharks	NHL	79	7	13	20	20	24	5	4	9	6
2016–17	San Jose Sharks	NHL	80	11	12	23	6	6	0	1	1	0
2017–18	San Jose Sharks	NHL	82	17	23	40	8	10	0	2	2	2
2018–19	Ottawa Senators	NHL	81	9	39	48	26	—	—	—	—	—
2019–20	Ottawa Senators	NHL	71	11	26	37	20	—	—	—	—	—
2020–21	Ottawa Senators	NHL	55	6	13	19	8	—	—	—	—	—
2021–22	Ottawa Senators	NHL	70	6	12	18	14	—	—	—	—	—
2022–23	Charlotte Checkers	AHL	20	3	13	16	10	—	—	—	—	—
2022–23	Florida Panthers	NHL	13	2	1	3	2	—	—	—	—	—
2022–23	Montreal Canadiens	NHL	23	1	6	7	4	—	—	—	—	—
2023–24	New Jersey Devils	NHL	52	4	8	12	21	—	—	—	—	—
2024–25	Dinamo Minsk	KHL	60	10	10	20	8	11	2	6	8	2
2025–26	HC Ambrì-Piotta	NL	44	7	12	19	8	—	—	—	—	—
NHL totals			649	80	168	248	135	40	5	7	12	8
