= Timo Meier =

Swiss ice hockey player (born 1996)

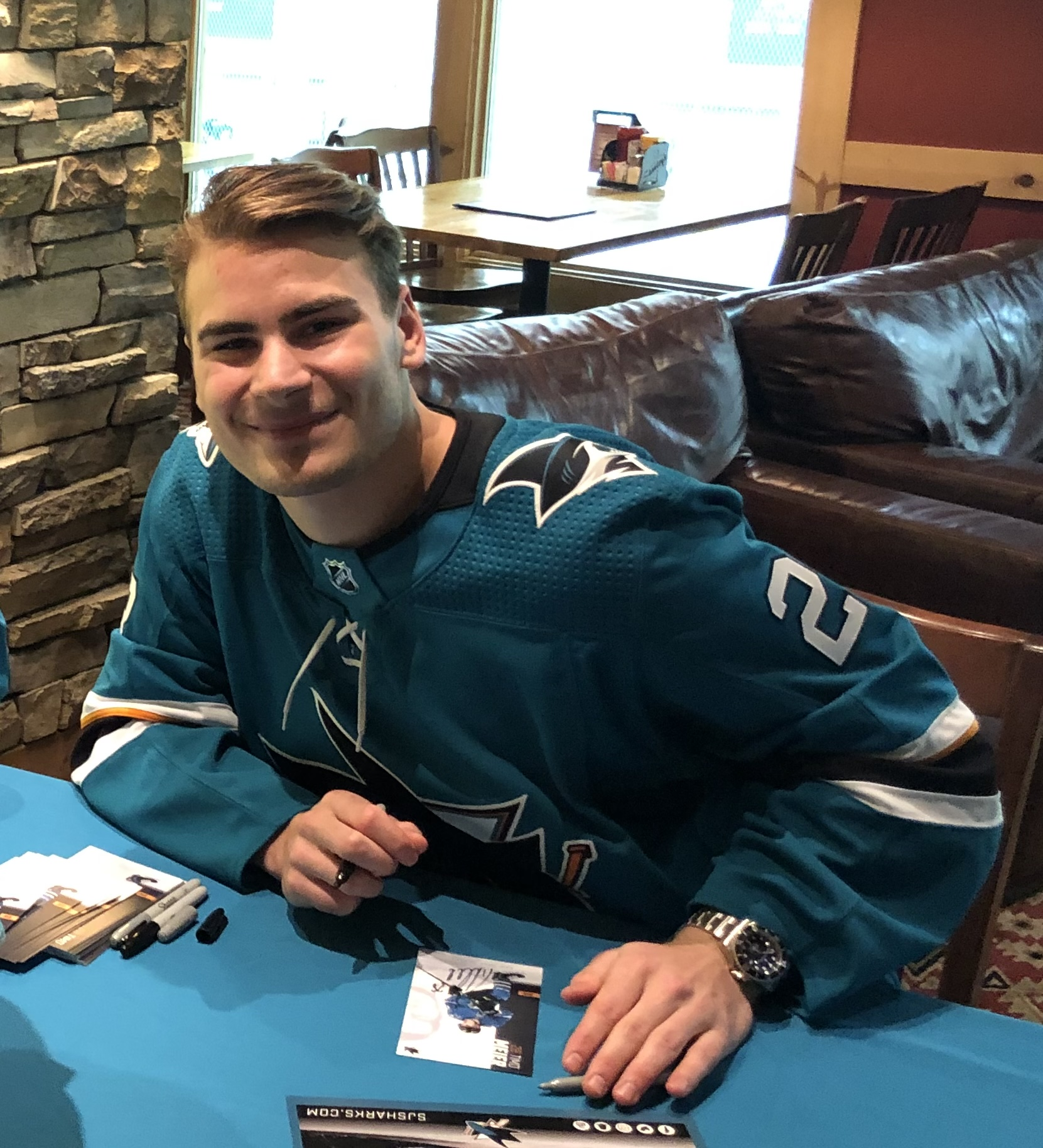
- Meier in 2019
- Born: 8 October 1996 (age 30) Herisau, Switzerland
- Height: 6 ft 1 in (185 cm)
- Weight: 220 lb (100 kg; 15 st 10 lb)
- Position: Winger
- Shoots: Left
- NHL team Former teams: New Jersey Devils; San Jose Sharks
- National team: Switzerland
- NHL draft: 9th overall, 2015; San Jose Sharks
- Playing career: 2016–present

Timo Meier (Swiss Standard German pronunciation: [ˈtiːmo ˈmaɪər]; born 8 October 1996) is a Swiss professional ice hockey player who is a winger for the New Jersey Devils of the National Hockey League (NHL). After being selected ninth overall by the San Jose Sharks in the 2015 NHL entry draft, Meier became the third Swiss player in franchise history to be drafted by the team.

Growing up in Herisau, Switzerland, Meier began playing ice hockey at a young age. At age 15, he accepted an apprenticeship position with the SC Rapperswil-Jona Lakers, a National A League team in Switzerland, where he observed and learned from David Aebischer and Jason Spezza. After completing the 2012–13 season in his native Switzerland with the U17 SC Rapperswil-Jona Lakers, Meier was selected 12th overall by the Halifax Mooseheads in the 2013 Canadian Hockey League Import Draft. Meier spent three seasons with the Mooseheads before being traded to the Rouyn–Noranda Huskies to complete his major junior ice hockey career.

Despite impressing the Sharks' coaching staff during their 2016 training camp, an illness held off Meier's NHL debut until 16 December. Following his NHL debut, Meier remained in the Sharks' lineup and he continued to impress the Sharks' coaching staff with his play. On 17 January 2022, Meier became the first player in Sharks franchise history to score five goals in one game. After seven seasons with San Jose, Meier was traded to the New Jersey Devils in 2023.

Internationally, Meier has played for the Swiss national team at two World Championships, winning a silver medal in 2018.

== Early life ==
Meier was born on 8 October 1996, in Herisau, Switzerland, to parents Claudia and Charly. As the youngest of two children, Meier grew up playing ice hockey and described himself as passionate about hockey from a young age. At age 15, Meier accepted an apprenticeship position with the SC Rapperswil-Jona Lakers, a National A League team in Switzerland, where he observed and learned from David Aebischer and Jason Spezza.

== Playing career ==
=== Major junior ===
In the 2012–13 season, Meier played in his native Switzerland at the Elite Jr. A level with the U17 SC Rapperswil-Jona Lakers. His play with the Lakers earned him international attention and he was selected 12th overall by the Halifax Mooseheads in the 2013 Canadian Hockey League (CHL) Import Draft. Upon being drafted, he was expected to be one of the Mooseheads' core members alongside Danish player Nikolaj Ehlers. At the age of 16, Meier weighed 185 lb (84 kg) and felt confident in his playing abilities to join the CHL for the 2013–14 season. However, he later reflected that playing in the CHL was different than in Switzerland as he was competing against older players and had to play a more physical game. In his rookie season, he tallied 17 goals and 17 assists for 34 points through 66 games.

Following his rookie season, Meier returned to Switzerland and trained with former professional ice hockey player Sandro Bertaggia. Meier improved offensively in his sophomore year, winning the Mike Bossy Trophy as the QMJHL Best Professional Prospect and being named to the QMJHL Second All-Star Team. During the season, he maintained a 27-game point streak between 2 November and 26 February where he tallied 51 points. His career-best 44 goals and 46 assists for 90 points through 61 games, earned him significant attention from hockey scouts leading up to the 2015 NHL entry draft. Leading up to the 2015 Draft, Meier was ranked 12th amongst draft eligible players by Bob McKenzie of The Sports Network. Meier was eventually drafted in the first round, ninth overall, by the San Jose Sharks, becoming the third Swiss player ever drafted by the Sharks. He was shortly thereafter invited to the Sharks' 2015 Development Camp and signed a three-year entry-level contract.

After signing his entry-level contract, Meier returned to the Mooseheads for the 2015–16 season, where he was named team captain a few weeks before the start of the season. During his short time as captain, Meier accumulated 11 goals and 25 assists for 36 points through 23 games. On 6 January 2016, Meier was traded to the Rouyn-Noranda Huskies in exchange for a first-round pick in 2017, a second-round pick in 2017 and a fourth-round pick in 2018. As a member of the Huskies, Meier helped them qualify for the playoffs as they finished the 2015–16 QMJHL regular season with the best record in the league. During the Huskies' first-round sweep against the Drummondville Voltigeurs, Meier recorded 13 points in 4 games, including a hat-trick and two assists in the eventual 7–3 win of Game Four. Meier finished the QMJHL playoffs with 11 goals and 23 points through 18 games to help the Huskies clinch the President Cup as QMJHL champions.

=== San Jose Sharks ===
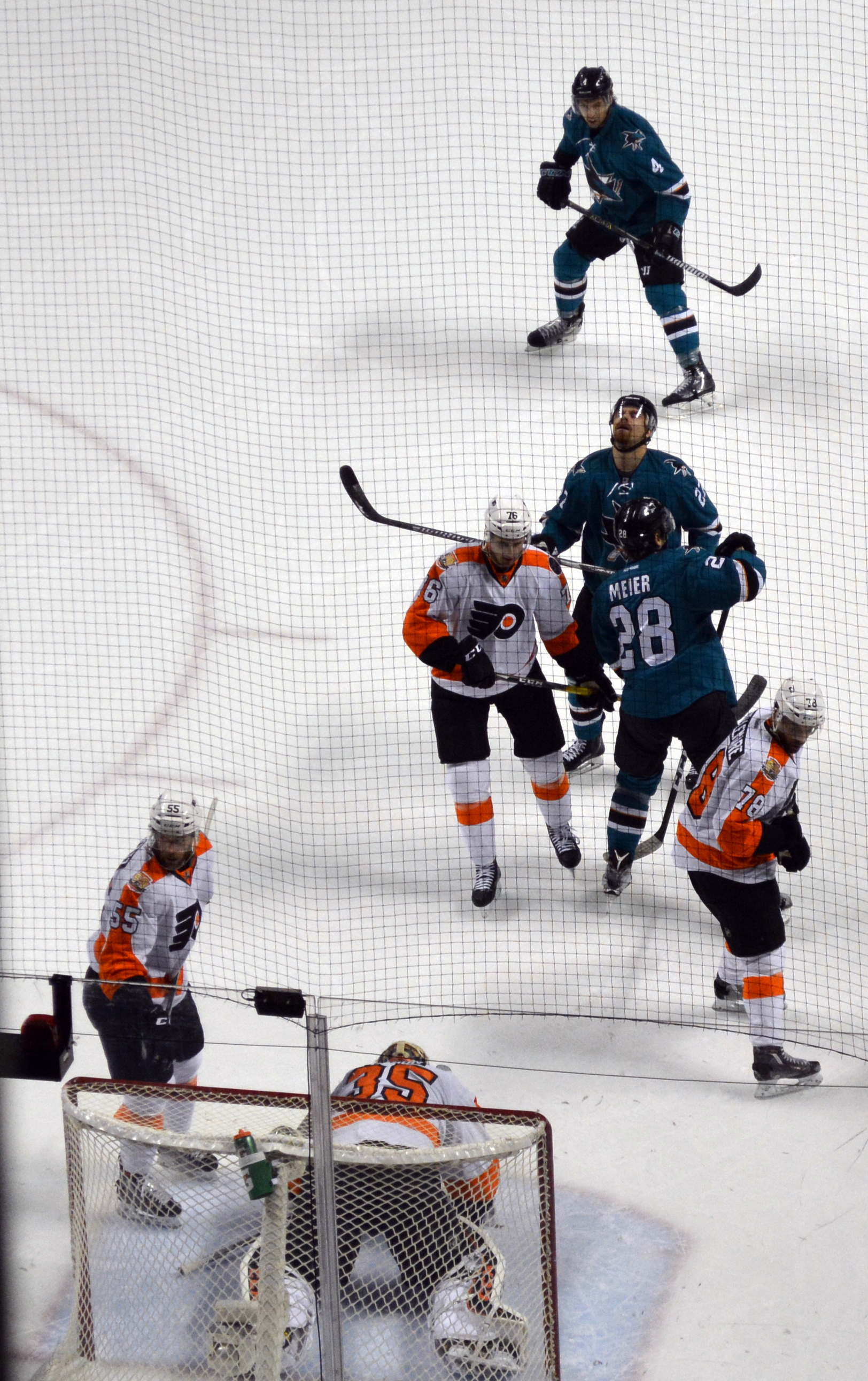
Meier during a game against the Philadelphia Flyers in 2016.

Despite impressing the Sharks' coaching staff during training camp, an illness held off Meier's NHL debut for the start of the 2016–17 season. After missing nearly a month due to mononucleosis, Meier was assigned to the Sharks' American Hockey League (AHL) affiliate, the San Jose Barracuda, on 26 October 2016. In the AHL, Meier continued to produce at the same pace he had in the QMJHL by accumulating 15 points through 17 games by mid-December. By December, he also maintained a four-game point streak as he led the Barracuda in goals and ranked second in points. After he scored four goals in two games with the Barracuda in early December, the Sharks intended to recall Meier to the NHL level on 7 December before he fell ill. Upon recovering from his illness, Meier was recalled to the NHL level on 15 December and he made his NHL debut the following day against the Montreal Canadiens. During the 4–2 win, Meier played alongside Joonas Donskoi and Chris Tierney as he scored his first career NHL goal against Carey Price in the first period.

Following his NHL debut, Meier remained in the Sharks' lineup and he continued to impress the Sharks' coaching staff with his play. During a 2–1 overtime loss against the Los Angeles Kings on 3 January 2017, Meier played on the top line with Joe Thornton and Joe Pavelski as he recorded a game-high seven hits and two shots on goal in 13:59 of ice time. Shortly after this game, Meier suffered an upper-body injury causing him to be scratched for the first time since joining the Sharks. He was re-assigned to the AHL level various times but was quickly recalled each time. After the Sharks finished the season in third place in the Pacific Division, Meier competed in five games against the Edmonton Oilers during the 2017 Stanley Cup playoffs. In Game 1, Meier put three shots on goal, managed a takeaway, and skated 10:35 of ice time in an eventual 3–2 overtime win. Once the Sharks were eliminated from playoff contention, Meier was re-assigned to the AHL, where he helped the Barracuda advance to the Western Conference Finals.

Following his rookie season, Meier became a mainstay in the Sharks' lineup and played in 81 games of the 2017–18 season. Although he finished the season with 36 points, he tallied only 3 goals in his first 28 games and was a healthy scratch in late October. In November 2017, Meier was fined $2,403.67 for striking Vancouver Canucks defenceman Michael Del Zotto in the face with his stick during San Jose's 5–0 win. Meier's offensive abilities sparked in late December as he scored five goals in eight games between 14 December and 2 January. He continued to produce in January as he scored three goals in four games later on in the month. His scoring prowess helped the Sharks qualify for the 2018 Stanley Cup playoffs, where they met the Anaheim Ducks in the first round. In the Sharks' first-round sweep of the Ducks, Meier tallied three points in four games but only managed one goal and an assist in six games against Vegas. Once the Sharks were eliminated, Meier joined Switzerland men's national ice hockey team at the 2018 IIHF World Championship.

After winning a silver medal with Switzerland, Meier returned to the Sharks for the 2018–19 season. As a result of the acquisition of Erik Karlsson during the off-season, and his impressive play during the 2017–18 season, Meier began the campaign on the Sharks' second line alongside Logan Couture and Tomáš Hertl. He began the season strong by maintaining a career-high nine-game point streak, which also included a five-game goal-scoring streak from 9 to 30 October. Meier subsequently became the second youngest in franchise history to register a point streak of nine games or more. His point streak ended in a 4–1 loss to the Columbus Blue Jackets on 1 November 2018. By the end of October, Meier led the Sharks in goals, plus/minus, power-play goals and finished second in points and shots. Within the next month, he continued to produce offensively and he continued to lead the team with 18 goals and 14 assists for 32 points. Five of those eighteen goals came during a four-game period after he missed three with an upper-body injury. Meier's production helped the Sharks maintain an 18–11–5 record to tie them for second place in the Pacific Division behind the Calgary Flames by mid-December.

When the Sharks qualified for the 2019 Stanley Cup playoffs in March, Meier was one of five Sharks players who had tallied at least 24 goals. In the same month, he was fined $2,000 for embellishment after an incident involving Roman Josi during a game against the Nashville Predators. The fine came after he was warned for the same issue during a game against the Winnipeg Jets in February. Meier concluded the 2018–19 regular season with a career-best 30 goals and 36 assists for 66 points through 78 games. He finished tied-for-third on the Sharks in goals, fourth in points, sixth in assists, tied for fourth in power-play goals, and third in shots. Although Meier sat out the Sharks' final game of the season with an undisclosed injury, he was expected to be ready for the playoffs. In Game 1 of the Western Conference Final against the St. Louis Blues, Meier recorded two goals and an assist in the 6–3 win. He finished the playoffs with five goals and 10 assists for 15 points through 20 games. As a result of his breakout season, Meier signed a four-year contract extension on 1 July to remain with the Sharks.

Following the departure of Joe Pavelski during the 2019–20 offseason, Meier was expected to replace him on the Sharks' first power-play unit and become a bigger presence on the penalty kill. The Sharks opened the season with four straight losses before winning three consecutive contests as Meier played in his 200th NHL game on 16 October. After going scoreless in five straight games, Meier scored his first career NHL hat-trick on 28 December 2019, in a 6–1 win over the Philadelphia Flyers. When the season was paused due to the COVID-19 pandemic, Meier led all San Jose skaters in points, was second in goals, third in assists, and tied for fourth in power-play points. He was subsequently voted the 2019–20 "Sharks Player of the Year" for the first time.

When the NHL resumed for their shortened 2020–21 season, Meier began playing on the Sharks' second line as a winger for Ryan Donato and Tomáš Hertl. Due to the shortened season, the Sharks began by playing eight road games over 15 days and their poor performance placed them last in the Honda West Division by early February. Although his offensive ability lessened during the season, Meier was one of five Sharks players to score ten or more goals during the campaign. As a result of their lack of scoring depth and goaltending issues, the Sharks failed to qualify for the 2021 Stanley Cup playoffs.

After failing to qualify for the Stanley Cup playoffs the previous two seasons, Meier and the Sharks began the 2021–22 season with four straight wins. Shortly after ending their win streak, Meier and teammate Kevin Labanc were placed on the NHL's COVID-19 protocol list on 2 November. While Meier and six other players were recovering, the Sharks went 3–3–0 in their absence for a 7–5–1 overall record. Upon returning to the Sharks lineup, Meier maintained a three-game point streak which included four goals and two assists. On 16 December, Meier became the fourth Shark in franchise history to register at least 29 points in 25 games and the first since Joe Thornton in 2010.

By early January 2022, Meier led all Sharks players in assists and points while ranking second in goals. Across the league, he was tied for ninth in points while also setting a new career-high 1.22 points-per-game. His play during the first part of the season earned him a selection to the 2022 All-Star Game. Four days after the selection, he became the first player in Sharks franchise history to score five goals in one game, in a 6–2 win over the Los Angeles Kings. Following the five-goal game, Meier scored once more in a 3–2 loss to the Seattle Kraken and was subsequently named one of the NHL's three stars of the week.

=== New Jersey Devils ===
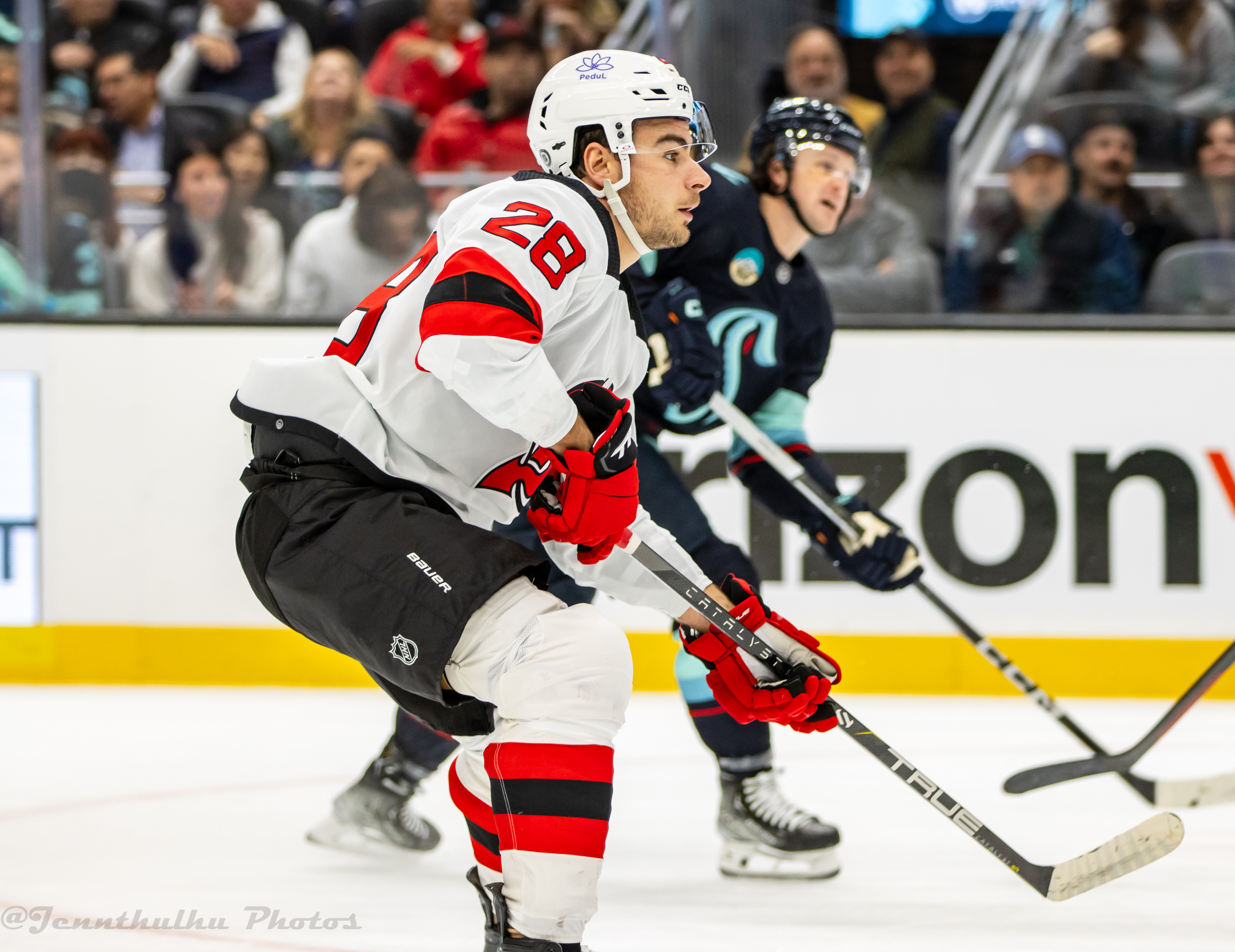
Meier in December 2023 with the New Jersey Devils

On 26 February 2023, Meier was traded to the New Jersey Devils in a multi-player trade. Recovering from injury, Meier later made his debut for the Devils against the Arizona Coyotes on 5 March. Finishing the regular season with nine goals and 14 points through 21 regular season games, Meier helped the Devils qualify for the playoffs for the first time in five seasons. In the playoffs, Meier led the Devils in hits and contributed with two goals and four points through 11 games.

As a pending restricted free agent at the conclusion of the season, Meier signed an eight-year, $70.4 million contract extension with the Devils on 28 June 2023.

== International play ==
Medal record

Men's ice hockey

Representing Switzerland

World Championships
Silver medal – second place	2018 Denmark	
Silver medal – second place	2025 Sweden/Denmark	
Silver medal – second place	2026 Switzerland	

Meier represented Switzerland at the 2025 IIHF World Championship, where he recorded three goals and seven assists in ten games and won a silver medal. He later represented Switzerland at the 2026 Winter Olympics.

== Career statistics ==
=== Regular season and playoffs ===
			Regular season					Playoffs
Season	Team	League	GP	G	A	Pts	PIM	GP	G	A	Pts	PIM
2011–12	Pikes EHC Oberthurgau	SUI U17	29	23	23	46	22	—	—	—	—	—
2011–12	Pikes EHC Oberthurgau II	SUI.4	1	2	2	4	0	—	—	—	—	—
2012–13	Rapperswil–Jona Lakers	SUI U17	10	11	17	28	2	2	2	1	3	0
2012–13	Rapperswil–Jona Lakers	SUI U20	33	13	17	30	56	—	—	—	—	—
2013–14	Halifax Mooseheads	QMJHL	66	17	17	34	48	12	1	3	4	8
2014–15	Halifax Mooseheads	QMJHL	61	44	46	90	59	14	10	11	21	18
2015–16	Halifax Mooseheads	QMJHL	23	11	25	36	22	—	—	—	—	—
2015–16	Rouyn–Noranda Huskies	QMJHL	29	23	28	51	24	18	11	12	23	30
2016–17	San Jose Barracuda	AHL	33	14	9	23	40	14	4	3	7	41
2016–17	San Jose Sharks	NHL	34	3	3	6	10	5	0	0	0	2
2017–18	San Jose Sharks	NHL	81	21	15	36	51	10	2	3	5	10
2018–19	San Jose Sharks	NHL	78	30	36	66	55	20	5	10	15	34
2019–20	San Jose Sharks	NHL	70	22	27	49	42	—	—	—	—	—
2020–21	San Jose Sharks	NHL	54	12	19	31	22	—	—	—	—	—
2021–22	San Jose Sharks	NHL	77	35	41	76	54	—	—	—	—	—
2022–23	San Jose Sharks	NHL	57	31	21	52	25	—	—	—	—	—
2022–23	New Jersey Devils	NHL	21	9	5	14	18	11	2	2	4	22
2023–24	New Jersey Devils	NHL	69	28	24	52	45	—	—	—	—	—
2024–25	New Jersey Devils	NHL	80	26	27	53	58	5	2	2	4	6
2025–26	New Jersey Devils	NHL	77	24	20	44	22	—	—	—	—	—
NHL totals			698	241	238	479	402	51	11	17	28	74

=== International ===
Year	Team	Event	Result	GP	G	A	Pts	PIM
2013	Switzerland	U18	6th	2	0	0	0	0
2013	Switzerland	IH18	6th	4	0	1	1	4
2015	Switzerland	WJC	9th	6	2	4	6	2
2016	Switzerland	WJC	9th	6	2	3	5	4
2018	Switzerland	WC	2nd place, silver medalist(s)	7	2	5	7	2
2021	Switzerland	WC	6th	8	4	2	6	6
2022	Switzerland	WC	5th	8	3	5	8	9
2025	Switzerland	WC	2nd place, silver medalist(s)	10	3	7	10	4
2026	Switzerland	OG	5th	5	3	4	7	0
2026	Switzerland	WC	2nd place, silver medalist(s)	9	3	8	11	6
Junior totals				18	4	8	12	10
Senior totals				47	18	31	49	27

== Awards and honours ==
Award	Year
QMJHL
Second All-Star Team	2015
Michael Bossy Trophy	2015
NHL
All-Star Game	2022

Awards and achievements
Preceded by Nikolay Goldobin	San Jose Sharks first-round draft pick 2015	Succeeded by Josh Norris
