= 2019 Stanley Cup playoffs =

2019 NHL postseason tournament

Tournament details
- Dates: April 10 – June 12, 2019
- Teams: 16
- Defending champions: Washington Capitals

Final positions
- Champions: St. Louis Blues
- Runners-up: Boston Bruins

Tournament statistics
- Scoring leader(s): Brad Marchand (Bruins) and Ryan O’Reilly (Blues) (23 points)

Awards
- MVP: Ryan O'Reilly (Blues)

The 2019 Stanley Cup playoffs was the playoff tournament of the National Hockey League (NHL) for the 2018–19 season. The playoffs began on April 10, 2019, after the regular season, and they concluded on June 12, 2019, with the St. Louis Blues winning their first Stanley Cup in franchise history defeating the Boston Bruins four games to three in the Stanley Cup Final.

The Tampa Bay Lightning made the playoffs as the Presidents' Trophy winners with the most points (i.e. best record) during the regular season. The Pittsburgh Penguins increased their postseason appearance streak to thirteen seasons, the current longest streak. The Carolina Hurricanes made the playoffs for the first time since 2009, ending a nine-year playoff drought. For the second season in a row, the Boston Bruins and Toronto Maple Leafs were the only Original Six teams to make the playoffs, marking the fifth time in league history (after 2000, 2001, 2007 and 2018) that only two Original Six teams clinched a playoff berth. For the first time since 2004, both Southern California teams, the Anaheim Ducks and Los Angeles Kings, missed the playoffs. For the second time in League history (and the second season in a row), both the Detroit Red Wings and Montreal Canadiens missed the playoffs.

For the first time since 1992 and the first time since the modern playoff format was introduced for the 2013–14 NHL season, all division winners were eliminated in one round: the first round as all the wild-cards advanced to the second round. The Columbus Blue Jackets won a playoff series for the first time, defeating the first-place Lightning in four games, and marking the first time in Stanley Cup playoff history that the Presidents' Trophy winners were swept in the opening round, and the first time since 2012 that the Presidents' Trophy winners were defeated in the opening round. They were soon followed by the Calgary Flames, who with their five-game loss to the Colorado Avalanche, ensured that for the first time in NHL history, neither of the conference number one seeds advanced to the second round. After that, the two remaining division winners, the Nashville Predators and Washington Capitals, were each eliminated in an overtime game, the Predators in six to the Dallas Stars and the defending champion Capitals in seven to the Carolina Hurricanes. Also for the first time since 2012, none of the previous year's Conference finalists (the Capitals, the Lightning, the Golden Knights, and the Jets) made it to the second round. For the first time in League history, three series were decided in game seven overtime. It was also the first year since 2007 that neither the Washington Capitals nor the Pittsburgh Penguins made the second round. This was the last time until 2026 that no Florida–based team reached the Stanley Cup Finals.

The Blues tied the 1987 Philadelphia Flyers, 2004 Calgary Flames, 2014 Los Angeles Kings, and 2015 Tampa Bay Lightning for playing the most playoff games (26) in a four-round playoff format. The record for most playoff games was subsequently broken by the 2020 Dallas Stars, who played 27 games during the expanded 2020 Stanley Cup playoffs. The Kings were the only other Stanley Cup champions to play 26 games.

== Playoff seeds ==
This was the sixth year in which the top three teams in each division make the playoffs, along with two wild cards in each conference (for a total of eight playoff teams from each conference).

The following teams qualified for the playoffs:

=== Eastern Conference ===
==== Atlantic Division ====
1. Tampa Bay Lightning, Atlantic Division champions, Eastern Conference regular season champions, Presidents' Trophy winners – 128 points
2. Boston Bruins – 107 points
3. Toronto Maple Leafs – 100 points

==== Metropolitan Division ====
1. Washington Capitals, Metropolitan Division champions – 104 points
2. New York Islanders – 103 points
3. Pittsburgh Penguins – 100 points

==== Wild cards ====
1. Carolina Hurricanes – 99 points
2. Columbus Blue Jackets – 98 points

=== Western Conference ===
==== Central Division ====
1. Nashville Predators, Central Division champions – 100 points
2. Winnipeg Jets – 99 points (45 ROWs)
3. St. Louis Blues – 99 points (42 ROWs)

==== Pacific Division ====
1. Calgary Flames, Pacific Division champions, Western Conference regular season champions – 107 points
2. San Jose Sharks – 101 points
3. Vegas Golden Knights – 93 points

==== Wild cards ====
1. Dallas Stars – 93 points
2. Colorado Avalanche – 90 points

== Playoff bracket ==
In each round, teams competed in a best-of-seven series following a 2–2–1–1–1 format (scores in the bracket indicate the number of games won in each best-of-seven series). The team with home ice advantage played at home for games one and two (and games five and seven, if necessary), and the other team was at home for games three and four (and game six, if necessary). The top three teams in each division made the playoffs, along with two wild cards in each conference, for a total of eight teams from each conference.

In the first round, the lower seeded wild card in the conference played against the division winner with the best record while the other wild card played against the other division winner, and both wild cards were de facto #4 seeds. The other series matched the second and third place teams from the divisions. In the first two rounds, home ice advantage was awarded to the team with the better seed. Thereafter, it was awarded to the team that had the better regular season record followed by any necessary tie breakers.

First round	Second round
A1	Tampa Bay	0
WC2	Columbus	4
WC2	Columbus	2
A2	Boston	4
A2	Boston	4
A3	Toronto	3
Eastern Conference
M1	Washington	3
WC1	Carolina	4
WC1	Carolina	4
M2	NY Islanders	0
M2	NY Islanders	4
M3	Pittsburgh	0
C1	Nashville	2
WC1	Dallas	4
WC1	Dallas	3
C3	St. Louis	4
C2	Winnipeg	2
C3	St. Louis	4
Western Conference
P1	Calgary	1
WC2	Colorado	4
WC2	Colorado	3
P2	San Jose	4
P2	San Jose	4
P3	Vegas	3

Conference finals
A2	Boston	4
WC1	Carolina	0
C3	St. Louis	4
P2	San Jose	2

Stanley Cup Final
A2	Boston	3
C3	St. Louis	4

Legend

- A1, A2, A3 – The first, second, and third place teams from the Atlantic Division, respectively
- M1, M2, M3 – The first, second, and third place teams from the Metropolitan Division, respectively
- C1, C2, C3 – The first, second, and third place teams from the Central Division, respectively
- P1, P2, P3 – The first, second, and third place teams from the Pacific Division, respectively
- WC1, WC2 – Wild Card teams

== First round ==
=== Eastern Conference first round ===
==== (A1) Tampa Bay Lightning vs. (WC2) Columbus Blue Jackets ====
The Tampa Bay Lightning earned the Presidents' Trophy as the NHL's best regular season team with 128 points. Columbus finished as the Eastern Conference's second wild card, earning 98 points. This was the first playoff meeting between these two teams. Tampa Bay won all three games in this year's regular season series.

The Blue Jackets defeated the Lightning in a four-game sweep, in one of the greatest upsets in NHL history. In game one, the Blue Jackets scored four unanswered goals to overcome a three-goal deficit, winning 4–3. Matt Duchene scored a goal and two assists for Columbus in game two, granting the Blue Jackets a 5–1 victory and a 2–0 series lead. During the game Nikita Kucherov hit Markus Nutivaara in the head, prompting NHL Player Safety to suspend the Lightning forward for game three. During said game, Sergei Bobrovsky made 30 saves, giving the Blue Jackets a 3–1 victory and their first 3–0 series lead in franchise history. In game four, the Lightning, desperate for a victory, could not overcome the early two-goal deficit they faced in the first period, allowing Columbus to score three empty-net goals late in the third period and win 7–3, sweeping Tampa Bay 4–0 and earning their first playoff series victory in franchise history. The Lightning became the first Presidents' Trophy winners to be swept in the opening round, and the first Presidents' Trophy winners to be defeated in the opening round since 2012.

April 10	Columbus Blue Jackets	4–3	Tampa Bay Lightning	Amalie Arena	Recap
No scoring		First period	04:12 – sh – Alex Killorn (1); 11:01 – Anthony Cirelli (1); 17:50 – Yanni Gourde (1)
Nick Foligno (1) – 09:15		Second period	No scoring
David Savard (1) – 07:56; Josh Anderson (1) – sh – 11:54; Seth Jones (1) – pp – 14:05		Third period	No scoring
Sergei Bobrovsky 26 saves / 29 shots		Goalie stats	Andrei Vasilevskiy 22 saves / 26 shots

April 12	Columbus Blue Jackets	5–1	Tampa Bay Lightning	Amalie Arena	Recap
Cam Atkinson (1) – 05:15; Zach Werenski (1) – pp – 11:44		First period	No scoring
Matt Duchene (1) – pp – 01:28		Second period	No scoring
Riley Nash (1) – 09:06; Artemi Panarin (1) – 12:15		Third period	05:00 – Mikhail Sergachev (1)
Sergei Bobrovsky 23 saves / 24 shots		Goalie stats	Andrei Vasilevskiy 22 saves / 27 shots

April 14	Tampa Bay Lightning	1–3	Columbus Blue Jackets	Nationwide Arena	Recap
No scoring		First period	No scoring
No scoring		Second period	01:44 – Matt Duchene (2); 08:25 – pp – Oliver Bjorkstrand (1)
Ondrej Palat (1) – 04:40		Third period	19:00 – en – Cam Atkinson (2)
Andrei Vasilevskiy 27 saves / 29 shots		Goalie stats	Sergei Bobrovsky 30 saves / 31 shots

April 16	Tampa Bay Lightning	3–7	Columbus Blue Jackets	Nationwide Arena	Recap
Steven Stamkos (1) – 08:44		First period	02:26 – pp – Alexandre Texier (1); 03:48 – Pierre-Luc Dubois (1)
Cedric Paquette (1) – 13:03; Brayden Point (1) – pp – 17:52		Second period	06:28 – Seth Jones (2); 18:46 – Oliver Bjorkstrand (2)
No scoring		Third period	18:07 – en – Artemi Panarin (2); 18:26 – en – Alexandre Texier (2); 19:51 – en – Matt Duchene (3)
Andrei Vasilevskiy 18 saves / 22 shots		Goalie stats	Sergei Bobrovsky 30 saves / 33 shots

Columbus won series 4–0

==== (A2) Boston Bruins vs. (A3) Toronto Maple Leafs ====
The Boston Bruins finished second in the Atlantic Division, earning 107 points. The Toronto Maple Leafs earned 100 points to finish third in the Atlantic Division. This was the sixteenth playoff meeting overall, and second consecutive, between these two teams, with Toronto winning eight of the fifteen previous series. They last met in the previous year's Eastern Conference first round, which Boston won in seven games. Boston won three of the four games in this year's regular season series.

The Bruins defeated the Maple Leafs in seven games. Mitch Marner scored twice in Toronto's game one victory, the final score of which was 4–1. Game two saw controversy in officiating, with Bruins players becoming more physical, to the point where Boston forward Jake DeBrusk collided with Toronto forward Nazem Kadri, who was skating hard out of the penalty box, resulting in a knee-on-knee collision, injuring the Maple Leafs forward. No penalty was called on the play. Kadri would return to the game, but retaliated against DeBrusk, cross-checking the forward in the head, resulting in a major penalty for the Toronto forward. Kadri was suspended for the remainder of the series. The Bruins ended the game 4–1. In game three, Auston Matthews and Andreas Johnsson scored a goal and notched an assist, leading the Maple Leafs to a 3–2 victory. In game four, the Bruins held on for a 6–4 victory, keeping the Maple Leafs from tying in the closing minutes after leading by three goals in the third period. The Maple Leafs scored twice in the third period of game five and held onto a one-goal lead late in the game to give Toronto a 2–1 victory and a 3–2 series lead. In game six, Brad Marchand had two goals and an assist in a 4–2 Bruins victory to push the series to a seventh game. In the seventh game, Boston goalie Tuukka Rask made 32 saves to defeat the Maple Leafs 5–1 and advance to the second round.

April 11	Toronto Maple Leafs	4–1	Boston Bruins	TD Garden	Recap
Mitch Marner (1) – 16:44		First period	09:31 – pp – Patrice Bergeron (1)
Mitch Marner (2) – sh-ps – 02:47; William Nylander (1) – 18:25		Second period	No scoring
John Tavares (1) – en – 18:41		Third period	No scoring
Frederik Andersen 37 saves / 38 shots		Goalie stats	Tuukka Rask 29 saves / 32 shots

April 13	Toronto Maple Leafs	1–4	Boston Bruins	TD Garden	Recap
No scoring		First period	04:44 – Charlie Coyle (1); 16:04 – Brad Marchand (1)
No scoring		Second period	10:39 – Danton Heinen (1)
Nazem Kadri (1) – 10:44		Third period	15:03 – pp – Patrice Bergeron (2)
Frederik Andersen 37 saves / 41 shots		Goalie stats	Tuukka Rask 30 saves / 31 shots

April 15	Boston Bruins	2–3	Toronto Maple Leafs	Scotiabank Arena	Recap
No scoring		First period	No scoring
David Krejci (1) – 03:30; Charlie Coyle (2) – pp – 19:22		Second period	02:38 – Trevor Moore (1); 10:12 – pp – Auston Matthews (1); 17:12 – pp – Andreas Johnsson (1)
No scoring		Third period	No scoring
Tuukka Rask 31 saves / 34 shots		Goalie stats	Frederik Andersen 34 saves / 36 shots

April 17	Boston Bruins	6–4	Toronto Maple Leafs	Scotiabank Arena	Recap
Charlie McAvoy (1) – pp – 03:03; Brad Marchand (2) – 06:38		First period	17:55 – Zach Hyman (1)
David Pastrnak (1) – 03:16; David Pastrnak (2) – pp – 04:51		Second period	01:07 – Auston Matthews (2)
Zdeno Chara (1) – 05:39; Joakim Nordstrom (1) – en – 19:58		Third period	11:52 – pp – Auston Matthews (3); 13:27 – Travis Dermott (1)
Tuukka Rask 38 saves / 42 shots		Goalie stats	Frederik Andersen 25 saves / 30 shots

April 19	Toronto Maple Leafs	2–1	Boston Bruins	TD Garden	Recap
No scoring		First period	No scoring
No scoring		Second period	No scoring
Auston Matthews (4) – 11:33; Kasperi Kapanen (1) – 13:45		Third period	19:16 – David Krejci (2)
Frederik Andersen 28 saves / 29 shots		Goalie stats	Tuukka Rask 25 saves / 27 shots

April 21	Boston Bruins	4–2	Toronto Maple Leafs	Scotiabank Arena	Recap
Brad Marchand (3) – pp – 11:23; Torey Krug (1) – pp – 17:02		First period	09:42 – Morgan Rielly (1)
Jake DeBrusk (1) – 07:57		Second period	No scoring
Brad Marchand (4) – en – 18:06		Third period	04:15 – Auston Matthews (5)
Tuukka Rask 22 saves / 24 shots		Goalie stats	Frederik Andersen 37 saves / 40 shots

April 23	Toronto Maple Leafs	1–5	Boston Bruins	TD Garden	Recap
No scoring		First period	14:29 – Joakim Nordstrom (2); 17:46 – Marcus Johansson (1)
John Tavares (2) – 03:54		Second period	No scoring
No scoring		Third period	02:40 – Sean Kuraly (1); 17:26 – en – Charlie Coyle (3); 19:59 – en – Patrice Bergeron (3)
Frederik Andersen 27 saves / 30 shots		Goalie stats	Tuukka Rask 32 saves / 33 shots

Boston won series 4–3

==== (M1) Washington Capitals vs. (WC1) Carolina Hurricanes ====
The Washington Capitals finished first in the Metropolitan Division earning 104 points. Carolina finished as the Eastern Conference's first wild card earning 99 points. This was the first playoff meeting between these two teams. Washington won all four games in this year's regular season series.

The Hurricanes defeated the Capitals in seven games. In game one, Nicklas Backstrom scored twice and teammate John Carlson had three assists in Washington's 4–2 victory. During a tight back-and-forth game two, Brooks Orpik scored the overtime winner for the Capitals, giving Washington a 4–3 victory. In game three, Carolina forward Warren Foegele scored twice and assisted once as the Hurricanes limited the Capitals to 18 shots in a 5–0 blowout victory. During the game rookie Andrei Svechnikov was challenged by Alexander Ovechkin to a fight during which the young Hurricane forward was knocked out and removed from the game due to concussion protocol. The Capitals increased their shot count in game four, but Hurricanes goalie Petr Mrazek stopped 30 of those 31 shots, evening the series in a 2–1 victory. In game five, the Capitals blew out the Hurricanes 6–0 with Backstrom scoring two goals and adding two assists, as goaltender Braden Holtby stopped all 30 shots he faced. Carolina broke the tie in game six as they scored three goals in the third period to force a seventh game. The Hurricanes rallied from two separate two goal deficits to tie game seven forcing overtime. In double overtime, Carolina forward Brock McGinn ended the fourth longest game seven in NHL history at 11:05 by tipping in Justin Williams' shot to send the Hurricanes to the second round of the playoffs for the first time since 2009; with the victory Carolina has won five consecutive game sevens dating back to 2006.

April 11	Carolina Hurricanes	2–4	Washington Capitals	Capital One Arena	Recap
No scoring		First period	09:58 – Nicklas Backstrom (1); 13:10 – pp – Nicklas Backstrom (2); 18:05 – pp – Alexander Ovechkin (1)
No scoring		Second period	No scoring
Andrei Svechnikov (1) – 05:07; Andrei Svechnikov (2) – 07:26		Third period	19:23 – en – Lars Eller (1)
Petr Mrazek 14 saves / 17 shots		Goalie stats	Braden Holtby 27 saves / 29 shots

April 13	Carolina Hurricanes	3–4	OT	Washington Capitals	Capital One Arena	Recap
Lucas Wallmark (1) – 15:54		First period		03:37 – Nicklas Backstrom (3); 09:26 – T. J. Oshie (1)
Sebastian Aho (1) – 16:49		Second period		No scoring
Jordan Staal (1) – pp – 15:00		Third period		08:55 – Tom Wilson (1)
No scoring		First overtime period		01:48 – Brooks Orpik (1)
Petr Mrazek 29 saves / 33 shots		Goalie stats		Braden Holtby 25 saves / 28 shots

April 15	Washington Capitals	0–5	Carolina Hurricanes	PNC Arena	Recap
No scoring		First period	09:43 – Warren Foegele (1)
No scoring		Second period	06:09 – Warren Foegele (2); 11:40 – pp – Dougie Hamilton (1)
No scoring		Third period	09:47 – pp – Dougie Hamilton (2); 15:35 – Brock McGinn (1)
Braden Holtby 40 saves / 45 shots		Goalie stats	Petr Mrazek 18 saves / 18 shots

April 18	Washington Capitals	1–2	Carolina Hurricanes	PNC Arena	Recap
No scoring		First period	00:17 – Warren Foegele (3)
Alexander Ovechkin (2) – pp – 10:35		Second period	19:32 – Teuvo Teravainen (1)
No scoring		Third period	No scoring
Braden Holtby 22 saves / 24 shots		Goalie stats	Petr Mrazek 30 saves / 31 shots

April 20	Carolina Hurricanes	0–6	Washington Capitals	Capital One Arena	Recap
No scoring		First period	07:33 – pp – Nicklas Backstrom (4)
No scoring		Second period	14:21 – Nicklas Backstrom (5); 16:11 – Brett Connolly (1)
No scoring		Third period	01:04 – pp – Tom Wilson (2); 08:57 – ps – Nic Dowd (1); 10:14 – pp – Alexander Ovechkin (3)
Petr Mrazek 22 saves / 28 shots		Goalie stats	Braden Holtby 30 saves / 30 shots

April 22	Washington Capitals	2–5	Carolina Hurricanes	PNC Arena	Recap
Brett Connolly (2) – 05:06; Alexander Ovechkin (4) – 15:12		First period	10:35 – Warren Foegele (4)
No scoring		Second period	01:56 – Teuvo Teravainen (2)
No scoring		Third period	03:51 – Jordan Staal (2); 11:58 – Justin Williams (1); 16:54 – en – Dougie Hamilton (3)
Braden Holtby 31 saves / 35 shots		Goalie stats	Petr Mrazek 23 saves / 25 shots

April 24	Carolina Hurricanes	4–3	2OT	Washington Capitals	Capital One Arena	Recap
No scoring		First period		02:13 – Andre Burakovsky (1); 06:23 – Tom Wilson (3)
Sebastian Aho (2) – sh – 09:51; Teuvo Teravainen (3) – 16:37		Second period		13:22 – Evgeny Kuznetsov (1)
Jordan Staal (3) – 02:56		Third period		No scoring
Brock McGinn (2) – 11:05		Second overtime period		No scoring
Petr Mrazek 34 saves / 37 shots		Goalie stats		Braden Holtby 38 saves / 42 shots

Carolina won series 4–3

==== (M2) New York Islanders vs. (M3) Pittsburgh Penguins ====
The New York Islanders finished second in the Metropolitan Division with 103 points. The Pittsburgh Penguins earned 100 points to finish third in the Metropolitan Division. This was the fifth playoff meeting between these two teams with New York winning three of the four previous series. They last met in the 2013 Eastern Conference quarterfinals, which Pittsburgh won in six games. These teams split their four-game regular season series. This was the first time since the 1988 Patrick Division semifinals that the Islanders had home-ice advantage in a playoff series.

The Islanders defeated the Penguins in a four-game sweep. This was the first time the Islanders swept a series since winning the Stanley Cup back in 1983. In game one, New York goalie Robin Lehner made 41 saves and Josh Bailey scored 4:39 into overtime to give the Islanders a 4–3 victory. Jordan Eberle had a goal and an assist in game two, leading the Islanders to a 3–1 victory. In game three, Lehner stopped 25 of 26 shots helping the Islanders win 4–1. Game four was a tight-checking, defensive affair as the Islanders kept a one-goal lead over the Penguins for two periods until an empty-net goal by Bailey sealed the victory for New York defeating Pittsburgh 3–1 and advancing to the second round in a 4–0 sweep.

April 10	Pittsburgh Penguins	3–4	OT	New York Islanders	Nassau Coliseum	Recap
Phil Kessel (1) – 05:42		First period		01:40 – Jordan Eberle (1); 15:46 – pp – Brock Nelson (1)
Evgeni Malkin (1) – pp – 13:41		Second period		No scoring
Justin Schultz (1) – 18:31		Third period		12:35 – Nick Leddy (1)
No scoring		First overtime period		04:39 – Josh Bailey (1)
Matt Murray 29 saves / 33 shots		Goalie stats		Robin Lehner 41 saves / 44 shots

April 12	Pittsburgh Penguins	1–3	New York Islanders	Nassau Coliseum	Recap
No scoring		First period	No scoring
Erik Gudbranson (1) – 10:36		Second period	13:25 – Anthony Beauvillier (1)
No scoring		Third period	07:54 – Jordan Eberle (2); 11:38 – pp – Josh Bailey (2)
Matt Murray 31 saves / 34 shots		Goalie stats	Robin Lehner 32 saves / 33 shots

April 14	New York Islanders	4–1	Pittsburgh Penguins	PPG Paints Arena	Recap
Jordan Eberle (3) – 13:22; Brock Nelson (2) – 14:24		First period	12:54 – Garrett Wilson (1)
No scoring		Second period	No scoring
Leo Komarov (1) – 10:27; Anders Lee (1) – en – 18:32		Third period	No scoring
Robin Lehner 25 saves / 26 shots		Goalie stats	Matt Murray 32 saves / 35 shots

April 16	New York Islanders	3–1	Pittsburgh Penguins	PPG Paints Arena	Recap
Jordan Eberle (4) – 02:09; Brock Nelson (3) – 18:06		First period	00:35 – Jake Guentzel (1)
No scoring		Second period	No scoring
Josh Bailey (3) – en – 19:22		Third period	No scoring
Robin Lehner 32 saves / 33 shots		Goalie stats	Matt Murray 23 saves / 25 shots

New York won series 4–0

=== Western Conference first round ===
==== (C1) Nashville Predators vs. (WC1) Dallas Stars ====
The Nashville Predators finished first in the Central Division earning 100 points. Dallas finished as the Western Conference's first wild card earning 93 points. This was the first playoff meeting between these two teams. Nashville won three of the five games in this year's regular season series.

The Stars defeated the Predators in six games. Dallas rookie Miro Heiskanen scored a goal and an assist to help the Stars achieve a 3–2 victory in game one. In game two, both teams played defensively forcing an overtime period in which Nashville forward Craig Smith scored to give the Predators a 2–1 victory. Pekka Rinne stopped 40 shots in game three, ensuring a 3–2 Predators win. In another goalie performance for game four, Dallas' own Ben Bishop made 34 saves shutting down the Predators in a 5–1 victory. In game five, Alexander Radulov scored twice with captain Jamie Benn assisting thrice for the Stars taking the series lead in a 5–3 victory. During a defensive game six, both teams fired more than 35 shots apiece in regulation time with each team scoring once. In the resulting overtime period John Klingberg put away the series-winning goal at 17:02 for Dallas, winning the series 4–2 and the game 2–1.

April 10	Dallas Stars	3–2	Nashville Predators	Bridgestone Arena	Recap
No scoring		First period	12:12 – Roman Josi (1)
Miro Heiskanen (1) – pp – 12:37		Second period	No scoring
Alexander Radulov (1) – 06:10; Mats Zuccarello (1) – 10:39		Third period	13:24 – P. K. Subban (1)
Ben Bishop 30 saves / 32 shots		Goalie stats	Pekka Rinne 26 saves / 29 shots

April 13	Dallas Stars	1–2	OT	Nashville Predators	Bridgestone Arena	Recap
No scoring		First period		No scoring
Jamie Benn (1) – 01:59		Second period		03:56 – Rocco Grimaldi (1)
No scoring		Third period		No scoring
No scoring		First overtime period		05:00 – Craig Smith (1)
Ben Bishop 40 saves / 42 shots		Goalie stats		Pekka Rinne 22 saves / 23 shots

April 15	Nashville Predators	3–2	Dallas Stars	American Airlines Center	Recap
No scoring		First period	No scoring
Rocco Grimaldi (2) – 03:29; Filip Forsberg (1) – 14:35		Second period	17:11 – Mats Zuccarello (2)
Mikael Granlund (1) – 11:41		Third period	08:15 – Tyler Seguin (1)
Pekka Rinne 40 saves / 42 shots		Goalie stats	Ben Bishop 25 saves / 28 shots

April 17	Nashville Predators	1–5	Dallas Stars	American Airlines Center	Recap
No scoring		First period	03:42 – pp – Roope Hintz (1); 04:58 – pp – Alexander Radulov (2); 08:24 – Andrew Cogliano (1); 13:45 – pp – Mats Zuccarello (3)
No scoring		Second period	10:09 – Roope Hintz (2)
Roman Josi (2) – 08:11		Third period	No scoring
Pekka Rinne 4 saves / 8 shots Juuse Saros 20 saves / 21 shots		Goalie stats	Ben Bishop 34 saves / 35 shots

April 20	Dallas Stars	5–3	Nashville Predators	Bridgestone Arena	Recap
Jason Dickinson (1) – 13:08		First period	06:25 – Rocco Grimaldi (3)
Alexander Radulov (3) – 00:40; Alexander Radulov (4) – 07:41; Tyler Seguin (2) – 15:54		Second period	09:18 – Ryan Johansen (1)
Jason Dickinson (2) – 01:57		Third period	02:25 – Kyle Turris (1)
Ben Bishop 30 saves / 33 shots		Goalie stats	Pekka Rinne 21 saves / 26 shots

April 22	Nashville Predators	1–2	OT	Dallas Stars	American Airlines Center	Recap
Austin Watson (1) – 05:47		First period		No scoring
No scoring		Second period		05:20 – Blake Comeau (1)
No scoring		Third period		No scoring
No scoring		First overtime period		17:02 – John Klingberg (1)
Pekka Rinne 49 saves / 51 shots		Goalie stats		Ben Bishop 47 saves / 48 shots

Dallas won series 4–2

==== (C2) Winnipeg Jets vs. (C3) St. Louis Blues ====
The Winnipeg Jets finished second in the Central Division, earning 99 points. The St. Louis Blues also earned 99 points, but they finished third in the Central Division as Winnipeg won the first tie-breaker of combined regulation and overtime wins. This was the second playoff meeting between these two teams. They last met in the 1982 Norris Division Semifinal, which St. Louis won in four games. Winnipeg won three of the four games in this year's regular season series.

The Blues defeated the Jets in six games. For the first time since the 2004 Western Conference Final, the away team won the first five games in the series. In game one, rookie goaltender Jordan Binnington made 24 saves to give St. Louis a 2–1 victory. Oskar Sundqvist scored twice for the Blues in game two taking the triumph 4–3. In game three, Winnipeg forward Kyle Connor scored twice in a 6–3 victory. Game four remained scoreless until the third period in which both teams notched a goal; however, in overtime Connor scored the winning-goal for the Jets tying the series 2–2 in a 2–1 affair. His goal also Winnipeg's first playoff overtime goal in franchise history. Winnipeg took a two-goal lead in game five, but St. Louis tied the game in the third period and with 15 seconds left, Jaden Schwartz scored to give St. Louis a 3–2 victory. Schwartz scored a natural hat trick in game six as the Blues hung on to a 3–2 series clinching victory.

April 10	St. Louis Blues	2–1	Winnipeg Jets	Bell MTS Place	Recap
No scoring		First period	13:28 – Patrik Laine (1)
No scoring		Second period	No scoring
David Perron (1) – 04:05; Tyler Bozak (1) – 17:55		Third period	No scoring
Jordan Binnington 24 saves / 25 shots		Goalie stats	Connor Hellebuyck 24 saves / 26 shots

April 12	St. Louis Blues	4–3	Winnipeg Jets	Bell MTS Place	Recap
Oskar Sundqvist (1) – 05:23		First period	12:01 – Blake Wheeler (1)
Patrick Maroon (1) – 06:42; Oskar Sundqvist (2) – 09:50		Second period	02:49 – pp – Patrik Laine (2); 18:55 – pp – Mark Scheifele (1)
Ryan O'Reilly (1) – 03:46		Third period	No scoring
Jordan Binnington 26 saves / 29 shots		Goalie stats	Connor Hellebuyck 28 saves / 32 shots

April 14	Winnipeg Jets	6–3	St. Louis Blues	Enterprise Center	Recap
No scoring		First period	19:12 – pp – David Perron (2)
Kevin Hayes (1) – 04:57; Patrik Laine (3) – 07:47; Kyle Connor (1) – pp – 08:58		Second period	No scoring
Brandon Tanev (1) – 04:25; Dustin Byfuglien (1) – 08:06; Kyle Connor (2) – 14:44		Third period	01:51 – pp – Vladimir Tarasenko (1); 13:42 – Alexander Steen (1)
Connor Hellebuyck 26 saves / 29 shots		Goalie stats	Jordan Binnington 23 saves / 29 shots

April 16	Winnipeg Jets	2–1	OT	St. Louis Blues	Enterprise Center	Recap
No scoring		First period		No scoring
No scoring		Second period		No scoring
Mark Scheifele (2) – 07:33		Third period		00:35 – pp – Vladimir Tarasenko (2)
Kyle Connor (3) – 06:02		First overtime period		No scoring
Connor Hellebuyck 31 saves / 32 shots		Goalie stats		Jordan Binnington 37 saves / 39 shots

April 18	St. Louis Blues	3–2	Winnipeg Jets	Bell MTS Place	Recap
No scoring		First period	00:12 – Adam Lowry (1); 13:35 – Kevin Hayes (2)
No scoring		Second period	No scoring
Ryan O'Reilly (2) – pp – 01:29; Brayden Schenn (1) – 13:52; Jaden Schwartz (1) – 19:45		Third period	No scoring
Jordan Binnington 29 saves / 31 shots		Goalie stats	Connor Hellebuyck 26 saves / 29 shots

April 20	Winnipeg Jets	2–3	St. Louis Blues	Enterprise Center	Recap
No scoring		First period	00:23 – Jaden Schwartz (2)
No scoring		Second period	12:36 – pp – Jaden Schwartz (3)
Dustin Byfuglien (2) – 12:17; Bryan Little (1) – sh – 19:22		Third period	03:55 – Jaden Schwartz (4)
Connor Hellebuyck 33 saves / 36 shots		Goalie stats	Jordan Binnington 18 saves / 20 shots

St. Louis won series 4–2

==== (P1) Calgary Flames vs. (WC2) Colorado Avalanche ====
The Calgary Flames finished first in the Pacific Division earning 107 points. The Colorado Avalanche earned 90 points to finish as the Western Conference's second wild card. This was the first playoff meeting between these two teams. Calgary won all three games in this year's regular season series.

The Avalanche defeated the Flames in five games. In game one, goalie Mike Smith stopped all 26 shots he faced and assisted on one of Calgary's four goals in the Flames 4–0 victory. Game two necessitated overtime, and Nathan MacKinnon scored to give the Avalanche a 3–2 victory. The Avalanche scored six goals in game three, one of which included the first goal of Cale Makar in his NHL debut; Colorado won the game 6–2. In game four, Colorado came back from a two-goal deficit to force overtime and Mikko Rantanen scored his second of the night to give the Avalanche a 3–2 victory and a 3–1 series lead. Game five saw Colin Wilson and Rantanen both score twice, giving Colorado a 5–1 victory and advancing to the second round for the first time since 2008.

April 11	Colorado Avalanche	0–4	Calgary Flames	Scotiabank Saddledome	Recap
No scoring		First period	No scoring
No scoring		Second period	14:25 – Andrew Mangiapane (1); 18:58 – pp – Matthew Tkachuk (1)
No scoring		Third period	17:01 – pp – Mikael Backlund (1); 17:15 – en – Matthew Tkachuk (2)
Philipp Grubauer 28 saves / 31 shots		Goalie stats	Mike Smith 26 saves / 26 shots

April 13	Colorado Avalanche	3–2	OT	Calgary Flames	Scotiabank Saddledome	Recap
No scoring		First period		No scoring
Matt Nieto (1) – sh – 07:16		Second period		12:26 – pp – Rasmus Andersson (1)
J. T. Compher (1) – 17:21		Third period		12:27 – Sean Monahan (1)
Nathan MacKinnon (1) – 08:27		First overtime period		No scoring
Philipp Grubauer 35 saves / 37 shots		Goalie stats		Mike Smith 36 saves / 39 shots

April 15	Calgary Flames	2–6	Colorado Avalanche	Pepsi Center	Recap
No scoring		First period	08:26 – pp – Nathan MacKinnon (2); 13:34 – pp – Nathan MacKinnon (3); 16:02 – Cale Makar (1)
Sam Bennett (1) – pp – 08:34		Second period	07:51 – sh – Matt Nieto (2); 12:58 – Mikko Rantanen (1)
T. J. Brodie (1) – 01:09		Third period	00:54 – Erik Johnson (1)
Mike Smith 50 saves / 56 shots		Goalie stats	Philipp Grubauer 27 saves / 29 shots

April 17	Calgary Flames	2–3	OT	Colorado Avalanche	Pepsi Center	Recap
No scoring		First period		No scoring
Elias Lindholm (1) – pp – 03:25		Second period		No scoring
Derek Ryan (1) – 06:58		Third period		08:10 – J. T. Compher (2); 17:10 – pp – Mikko Rantanen (2)
No scoring		First overtime period		10:23 – Mikko Rantanen (3)
Mike Smith 49 saves / 52 shots		Goalie stats		Philipp Grubauer 35 saves / 37 shots

April 19	Colorado Avalanche	5–1	Calgary Flames	Scotiabank Saddledome	Recap
Gabriel Landeskog (1) – 09:40; Mikko Rantanen (4) – 15:38		First period	19:54 – T. J. Brodie (2)
Colin Wilson (1) – 06:52; Colin Wilson (2) – pp – 14:47		Second period	No scoring
Mikko Rantanen (5) – pp – 00:57		Third period	No scoring
Philipp Grubauer 28 saves / 29 shots		Goalie stats	Mike Smith 27 saves / 32 shots

Colorado won series 4–1

==== (P2) San Jose Sharks vs. (P3) Vegas Golden Knights ====
The San Jose Sharks finished second in the Pacific Division earning 101 points. The Vegas Golden Knights earned 93 points to finish third in Pacific Division. This was the second playoff meeting between these teams. They last met in the previous year's Western Conference second round which Vegas won in six games. These teams split their four-game regular season series.

The Sharks came back from a 3–1 series deficit to defeat the Golden Knights in seven games. Four Sharks players scored a goal and assisted on another goal in game one, giving San Jose a 5–2 victory. In game two, after a wild first period in which Vegas took a three-goal lead only for San Jose to tie before the period ended, Mark Stone's power-play goal in the second period would be the game-winner for the Golden Knights, defeating the Sharks 5–3. Stone continued his scoring into game three, adding a hat trick into Vegas' 6–3 victory. In game four, Max Pacioretty had two goals and two assists while goaltender Marc-Andre Fleury stopped all 28 shots granting Vegas a 5–0 victory and a 3–1 series lead. The Sharks avoided elimination in game five, outscoring the Golden Knights 5–2 to force a sixth game. In game six, the Sharks evened the series with a double-overtime short-handed goal by Tomas Hertl, backstopped by Martin Jones who made 58 saves in a 2–1 victory. In the seventh game, after taking a three-goal lead, in the third period, Vegas' Cody Eakin was assessed a controversial major penalty and game misconduct as a result of a play that injured Sharks forward Joe Pavelski. The Sharks took the lead 4–3 after scoring four unanswered goals on the ensuing five-minute power play. However, the Golden Knights tied the game with 47 seconds left in regulation, sending the game into overtime. At 18:19 of the first overtime, Barclay Goodrow scored the series-winning goal for the Sharks, coming back from a 3–1 series deficit and defeating the Golden Knights 5–4. The NHL later apologized to the Golden Knights for the call on Eakin, and the two referees working the game were suspended for the remainder of the playoffs. The Sharks became just the second team in NHL history, along with the 2013 Boston Bruins, to overcome a three-goal deficit in the third period of a seventh game.

April 10	Vegas Golden Knights	2–5	San Jose Sharks	SAP Center	Recap
No scoring		First period	14:42 – pp – Joe Pavelski (1)
Mark Stone (1) – 08:32		Second period	06:59 – Brent Burns (1); 07:44 – Marc-Edouard Vlasic (1); 19:42 – Evander Kane (1)
Mark Stone (2) – pp – 15:26		Third period	18:11 – en – Tomas Hertl (1)
Marc-Andre Fleury 28 saves / 32 shots		Goalie stats	Martin Jones 24 saves / 26 shots

April 12	Vegas Golden Knights	5–3	San Jose Sharks	SAP Center	Recap
Cody Eakin (1) – 00:58; Colin Miller (1) – sh – 04:37; Max Pacioretty (1) – 06:11		First period	16:59 – Logan Couture (1); 17:38 – pp – Tomas Hertl (2); 19:08 – Joe Thornton (1)
Mark Stone (3) – pp – 01:31		Second period	No scoring
William Karlsson (1) – sh – 07:35		Third period	No scoring
Marc-Andre Fleury 34 saves / 37 shots		Goalie stats	Martin Jones 4 saves / 7 shots Aaron Dell 14 saves / 16 shots

April 14	San Jose Sharks	3–6	Vegas Golden Knights	T-Mobile Arena	Recap
Kevin Labanc (1) – 15:26		First period	00:16 – Mark Stone (4); 12:16 – pp – Max Pacioretty (2)
No scoring		Second period	00:21 – Paul Stastny (1); 16:04 – pp – Paul Stastny (2)
Logan Couture (2) – pp – 04:57; Timo Meier (1) – 05:51		Third period	00:36 – Mark Stone (5); 13:57 – Mark Stone (6)
Martin Jones 34 saves / 40 shots		Goalie stats	Marc-Andre Fleury 25 saves / 28 shots

April 16	San Jose Sharks	0–5	Vegas Golden Knights	T-Mobile Arena	Recap
No scoring		First period	01:11 – Max Pacioretty (3); 19:13 – Shea Theodore (1)
No scoring		Second period	12:33 – pp – Max Pacioretty (4)
No scoring		Third period	06:37 – Alex Tuch (1); 16:24 – pp – Jonathan Marchessault (1)
Martin Jones 5 saves / 7 shots Aaron Dell 17 saves / 20 shots		Goalie stats	Marc-Andre Fleury 28 saves / 28 shots

April 18	Vegas Golden Knights	2–5	San Jose Sharks	SAP Center	Recap
Reilly Smith (1) – pp – 19:30		First period	01:16 – Tomas Hertl (3); 11:00 – Logan Couture (3)
No scoring		Second period	12:22 – Barclay Goodrow (1)
Jonathan Marchessault (2) – pp – 11:36		Third period	14:45 – pp – Tomas Hertl (4); 18:14 – en – Joe Pavelski (2)
Marc-Andre Fleury 24 saves / 28 shots		Goalie stats	Martin Jones 30 saves / 32 shots

April 21	San Jose Sharks	2–1	2OT	Vegas Golden Knights	T-Mobile Arena	Recap
Logan Couture (4) – 19:51		First period		No scoring
No scoring		Second period		11:20 – Jonathan Marchessault (3)
No scoring		Third period		No scoring
Tomas Hertl (5) – sh – 11:17		Second overtime period		No scoring
Martin Jones 58 saves / 59 shots		Goalie stats		Marc-Andre Fleury 27 saves / 29 shots

April 23	Vegas Golden Knights	4–5	OT	San Jose Sharks	SAP Center	Recap
William Karlsson (2) – 10:10		First period		No scoring
Cody Eakin (2) – 10:00		Second period		No scoring
Max Pacioretty (5) – 03:36; Jonathan Marchessault (4) – 19:13		Third period		09:20 – pp – Logan Couture (5); 10:09 – pp – Tomas Hertl (6); 12:53 – pp – Logan Couture (6); 13:21 – pp – Kevin Labanc (2)
No scoring		First overtime period		18:19 – Barclay Goodrow (2)
Marc-Andre Fleury 43 saves / 48 shots		Goalie stats		Martin Jones 34 saves / 38 shots

San Jose won series 4–3

== Second round ==
=== Eastern Conference second round ===
==== (A2) Boston Bruins vs. (WC2) Columbus Blue Jackets ====
This was the first playoff meeting between these two teams. Boston won two of the three games in this year's regular season series.

The Bruins defeated the Blue Jackets in six games. In game one, Charlie Coyle scored his second goal of the game in the first overtime at 5:15 to give the Bruins a 3–2 victory. Game two required overtime again with both teams tied 2–2 in regulation, and in double-overtime Matt Duchene scored on the power-play at 3:42 to give Columbus the victory. Sergei Bobrovsky made 36 saves in game three backstopping the Blue Jackets to a 2–1 victory. In game four, Patrice Bergeron scored twice and goaltender Tuukka Rask made 39 saves to edge Columbus 4–1 and tie the series 2–2. The Bruins held off the Blue Jackets two-goal rally in game five with David Pastrnak scoring with 1:28 left in the third period to give Boston a 4–3 victory and a 3–2 series lead. In game six, Rask shut the door on the Blue Jackets, stopping all 39 shots he faced in a 3–0 victory and winning the series 4–2.

April 25	Columbus Blue Jackets	2–3	OT	Boston Bruins	TD Garden	Recap
No scoring		First period		10:34 – sh – Noel Acciari (1)
No scoring		Second period		No scoring
Brandon Dubinsky (1) – 07:39; Pierre-Luc Dubois (2) – 07:52		Third period		15:25 – Charlie Coyle (4)
No scoring		First overtime period		05:15 – Charlie Coyle (5)
Sergei Bobrovsky 34 saves / 37 shots		Goalie stats		Tuukka Rask 20 saves / 22 shots

April 27	Columbus Blue Jackets	3–2	2OT	Boston Bruins	TD Garden	Recap
No scoring		First period		07:50 – pp – Matt Grzelcyk (1)
Artemi Panarin (3) – pp – 01:03; Artemi Panarin (4) – 08:01		Second period		02:01 – David Pastrnak (3)
No scoring		Third period		No scoring
Matt Duchene (4) – pp – 03:42		Second overtime period		No scoring
Sergei Bobrovsky 29 saves / 31 shots		Goalie stats		Tuukka Rask 38 saves / 41 shots

April 30	Boston Bruins	1–2	Columbus Blue Jackets	Nationwide Arena	Recap
No scoring		First period	18:37 – Boone Jenner (1)
Jake DeBrusk (2) – 19:20		Second period	12:42 – pp – Matt Duchene (5)
No scoring		Third period	No scoring
Tuukka Rask 32 saves / 34 shots		Goalie stats	Sergei Bobrovsky 36 saves / 37 shots

May 2	Boston Bruins	4–1	Columbus Blue Jackets	Nationwide Arena	Recap
David Pastrnak (4) – 03:33; Patrice Bergeron (4) – pp – 07:18		First period	08:46 – Artemi Panarin (5)
No scoring		Second period	No scoring
Sean Kuraly (2) – 08:40; Patrice Bergeron (5) – pp – 17:30		Third period	No scoring
Tuukka Rask 39 saves / 40 shots		Goalie stats	Sergei Bobrovsky 42 saves / 46 shots

May 4	Columbus Blue Jackets	3–4	Boston Bruins	TD Garden	Recap
No scoring		First period	No scoring
No scoring		Second period	01:39 – David Krejci (3)
Seth Jones (3) – 10:33; Ryan Dzingel (1) – 12:07; Dean Kukan (1) – 13:58		Third period	04:51 – Brad Marchand (5); 11:16 – David Pastrnak (5); 18:32 – David Pastrnak (6)
Sergei Bobrovsky 32 saves / 36 shots		Goalie stats	Tuukka Rask 33 saves / 36 shots

May 6	Boston Bruins	3–0	Columbus Blue Jackets	Nationwide Arena	Recap
No scoring		First period	No scoring
David Krejci (4) – 12:13		Second period	No scoring
Marcus Johansson (2) – 08:58; David Backes (1) – 10:39		Third period	No scoring
Tuukka Rask 39 saves / 39 shots		Goalie stats	Sergei Bobrovsky 26 saves / 29 shots

Boston won series 4–2

==== (M2) New York Islanders vs. (WC1) Carolina Hurricanes ====
This was the first playoff meeting between these two teams. New York won three of the four games in this year's regular season series.

The Hurricanes defeated the Islanders in a four-game sweep. In game one, Islanders goaltender Robin Lehner and Hurricanes goaltender Petr Mrazek stayed stout in regulation with Lehner stopping 29 shots and Mrazek stopping 30. During the ensuing overtime, Jordan Staal scored to give Carolina 1–0 victory. In game two, Warren Foegele and Nino Niederreiter scored 48 seconds apart in the third period to take the lead 2–1 giving Carolina the victory. In the second period of game two, Petr Mrazek was injured, leading to Curtis McElhinney replacing him in net for the remainder of the series; as a result McElhinney, at 35 years old, became the oldest goaltender in NHL history to make his first career playoff start in game three. Teuvo Teravainen scored twice in game three to give the Hurricanes a 5–2 victory and a 3–0 series lead. Teravainen continued his scoring into game four, notching a goal and an assist in Carolina's 5–2 victory. This was the Hurricanes' first four-game series sweep in franchise history and the franchise's first sweep since the Hartford Whalers swept the Quebec Nordiques in three games during the 1986 Adams Division semifinals. In addition, the Islanders were swept in a playoff series for the first time since the 1994 Eastern Conference quarterfinals against the New York Rangers. This was the first time since the 1993 Buffalo Sabres that a team who swept a first round playoff series got swept in the second round. Game two was the last Stanley Cup playoffs game to be held at Barclays Center.

April 26	Carolina Hurricanes	1–0	OT	New York Islanders	Barclays Center	Recap
No scoring		First period		No scoring
No scoring		Second period		No scoring
No scoring		Third period		No scoring
Jordan Staal (4) – 04:04		First overtime period		No scoring
Petr Mrazek 31 saves / 31 shots		Goalie stats		Robin Lehner 31 saves / 32 shots

April 28	Carolina Hurricanes	2–1	New York Islanders	Barclays Center	Recap
No scoring		First period	13:17 – pp – Mathew Barzal (1)
No scoring		Second period	No scoring
Warren Foegele (5) – 00:17; Nino Niederreiter (1) – 01:05		Third period	No scoring
Petr Mrazek 9 saves / 10 shots Curtis McElhinney 17 saves / 17 shots		Goalie stats	Robin Lehner 16 saves / 18 shots

May 1	New York Islanders	2–5	Carolina Hurricanes	PNC Arena	Recap
Devon Toews (1) – pp – 08:20		First period	06:41 – Teuvo Teravainen (4)
Josh Bailey (4) – 14:13		Second period	11:58 – Justin Faulk (1)
No scoring		Third period	10:15 – Justin Williams (2); 19:02 – en – Teuvo Teravainen (5); 19:55 – en – Sebastian Aho (3)
Robin Lehner 33 saves / 36 shots		Goalie stats	Curtis McElhinney 28 saves / 30 shots

May 3	New York Islanders	2–5	Carolina Hurricanes	PNC Arena	Recap
Mathew Barzal (2) – pp – 02:30		First period	04:44 – pp – Sebastian Aho (4)
No scoring		Second period	02:11 – Teuvo Teravainen (6); 03:17 – Greg McKegg (1); 08:51 – Justin Williams (3)
Brock Nelson (4) – 18:51		Third period	15:13 – Andrei Svechnikov (3)
Robin Lehner 8 saves / 11 shots Thomas Greiss 8 saves / 10 shots		Goalie stats	Curtis McElhinney 26 saves / 28 shots

Carolina won series 4–0

=== Western Conference second round ===
==== (C3) St. Louis Blues vs. (WC1) Dallas Stars ====
This was the fourteenth playoff meeting between these two teams with St. Louis winning seven of the thirteen previous series. They last met in the 2016 Western Conference second round, which St. Louis won in seven games. Dallas won three of the four games in this year's regular season series.

The Blues defeated the Stars in seven games. Vladimir Tarasenko scored twice for the Blues in game one, holding the Stars to a close 3–2 victory. In game two, the Stars bounced back with rookie Roope Hintz scoring two goals and adding an assist in a 4–2 win. With 1:38 left in the third period of game three, Patrick Maroon put the Blues ahead 4–3 holding on the lead for the victory. Ben Bishop held the fort for the Stars, making 27 saves in game four for a 4–2 triumph. Bishop continued his goal-tending prowess into game five, stopping 38 shots for the Stars in a 2–1 victory. The Blues scored 33 seconds apart in the third period of game six to force a seventh game winning 4–1. In game seven, although Stars goaltender Ben Bishop made a valiant effort stopping 52 shots, Patrick Maroon's goal at 5:50 of double-overtime sent the Blues to the Western Conference Final defeating Dallas 2–1.

April 25	Dallas Stars	2–3	St. Louis Blues	Enterprise Center	Recap
No scoring		First period	05:57 – Robby Fabbri (1)
Jason Spezza (1) – 10:25		Second period	18:03 – pp – Vladimir Tarasenko (3)
Jamie Benn (2) – pp – 17:43		Third period	03:51 – Vladimir Tarasenko (4)
Ben Bishop 17 saves / 20 shots		Goalie stats	Jordan Binnington 27 saves / 29 shots

April 27	Dallas Stars	4–2	St. Louis Blues	Enterprise Center	Recap
Roope Hintz (3) – 07:11; Miro Heiskanen (2) – 13:39; Mattias Janmark (1) – 14:51		First period	14:25 – Colton Parayko (1)
No scoring		Second period	No scoring
Roope Hintz (4) – en – 19:57		Third period	01:48 – Jaden Schwartz (5)
Ben Bishop 32 saves / 34 shots		Goalie stats	Jordan Binnington 31 saves / 34 shots

April 29	St. Louis Blues	4–3	Dallas Stars	American Airlines Center	Recap
Jaden Schwartz (6) – 01:27		First period	17:12 – pp – Alexander Radulov (5)
Tyler Bozak (2) – 08:30		Second period	No scoring
Alex Pietrangelo (1) – 14:24; Patrick Maroon (2) – 18:22		Third period	13:06 – sh – Andrew Cogliano (2); 15:52 – Tyler Seguin (3)
Jordan Binnington 28 saves / 31 shots		Goalie stats	Ben Bishop 30 saves / 34 shots

May 1	St. Louis Blues	2–4	Dallas Stars	American Airlines Center	Recap
Vladimir Tarasenko (5) – pp – 05:02		First period	11:23 – Jason Dickinson (3); 19:08 – pp – Jason Spezza (2)
No scoring		Second period	09:26 – John Klingberg (2); 17:28 – Roope Hintz (5)
Robert Thomas (1) – 13:44		Third period	No scoring
Jordan Binnington 27 saves / 31 shots		Goalie stats	Ben Bishop 27 saves / 29 shots

May 3	Dallas Stars	2–1	St. Louis Blues	Enterprise Center	Recap
Jason Spezza (3) – 02:42		First period	No scoring
Esa Lindell (1) – 06:13		Second period	No scoring
No scoring		Third period	08:26 – Jaden Schwartz (7)
Ben Bishop 38 saves / 39 shots		Goalie stats	Jordan Binnington 25 saves / 27 shots

May 5	St. Louis Blues	4–1	Dallas Stars	American Airlines Center	Recap
Alex Pietrangelo (2) – 01:03		First period	11:35 – pp – Tyler Seguin (4)
David Perron (3) – 15:24		Second period	No scoring
Jaden Schwartz (8) – 07:37; Sammy Blais (1) – 08:10		Third period	No scoring
Jordan Binnington 22 saves / 23 shots		Goalie stats	Ben Bishop 16 saves / 20 shots Anton Khudobin 5 saves / 5 shots

May 7	Dallas Stars	1–2	2OT	St. Louis Blues	Enterprise Center	Recap
Mats Zuccarello (4) – 15:55		First period		13:30 – Vince Dunn (1)
No scoring		Second period		No scoring
No scoring		Third period		No scoring
No scoring		Second overtime period		05:50 – Patrick Maroon (3)
Ben Bishop 52 saves / 54 shots		Goalie stats		Jordan Binnington 29 saves / 30 shots

St. Louis won series 4–3

==== (P2) San Jose Sharks vs. (WC2) Colorado Avalanche ====
This was the fifth playoff meeting between these two teams with both teams splitting the four previous series. They last met in the 2010 Western Conference quarterfinals which San Jose won in six games. San Jose won all three games in this year's regular season series.

The Sharks defeated the Avalanche in seven games. In game one, Brent Burns had a goal and three assists in the Sharks' convincing 5–2 victory. Tyson Barrie scored a goal and assisted on two more in game two, giving the Avalanche a 4–3 win. In game three, Sharks forward Logan Couture scored his first playoff hat trick en route to a 4–2 victory. The Avalanche shut out the Sharks 3–0 in game four as goaltender Philipp Grubauer stopped all 32 shots he faced. In game five, the Sharks put up 39 shots against the Avalanche with two goals coming from forward Tomas Hertl in a 2–1 victory. J. T. Compher scored twice and Gabriel Landeskog scored at 2:32 of the first overtime to force a seventh game defeating the Sharks 4–3. In game seven, Burns had two assists, including one on Joonas Donskoi's series-winning goal, that helped the Sharks win 3–2 and advance to the conference finals.

April 26	Colorado Avalanche	2–5	San Jose Sharks	SAP Center	Recap
Gabriel Bourque (1) – 02:10		First period	14:44 – Gustav Nyquist (1)
Colin Wilson (3) – pp – 03:56		Second period	10:05 – Joe Thornton (2); 16:02 – Kevin Labanc (3); 19:00 – Brent Burns (2)
No scoring		Third period	19:31 – en – Timo Meier (2)
Philipp Grubauer 22 saves / 26 shots		Goalie stats	Martin Jones 26 saves / 28 shots

April 28	Colorado Avalanche	4–3	San Jose Sharks	SAP Center	Recap
No scoring		First period	07:57 – Evander Kane (2)
Gabriel Landeskog (2) – 08:21; Tyson Barrie (1) – 16:31		Second period	No scoring
Matt Nieto (3) – 10:10; Nathan MacKinnon (4) – en – 18:58		Third period	15:26 – Brent Burns (3); 19:49 – pp – Brent Burns (4)
Philipp Grubauer 31 saves / 34 shots		Goalie stats	Martin Jones 28 saves / 31 shots

April 30	San Jose Sharks	4–2	Colorado Avalanche	Pepsi Center	Recap
Logan Couture (7) – 15:24; Timo Meier (3) – 18:42		First period	No scoring
No scoring		Second period	15:51 – Nathan MacKinnon (5)
Logan Couture (8) – 12:50; Logan Couture (9) – en – 19:30		Third period	11:45 – Matt Nieto (4)
Martin Jones 25 saves / 27 shots		Goalie stats	Philipp Grubauer 27 saves / 30 shots

May 2	San Jose Sharks	0–3	Colorado Avalanche	Pepsi Center	Recap
No scoring		First period	No scoring
No scoring		Second period	10:34 – Nathan MacKinnon (6)
No scoring		Third period	03:11 – Colin Wilson (4); 18:51 – en – Erik Johnson (2)
Martin Jones 25 saves / 27 shots		Goalie stats	Philipp Grubauer 32 saves / 32 shots

May 4	Colorado Avalanche	1–2	San Jose Sharks	SAP Center	Recap
No scoring		First period	No scoring
Tyson Jost (1) – 17:01		Second period	19:40 – pp – Tomas Hertl (7)
No scoring		Third period	06:26 – Tomas Hertl (8)
Philipp Grubauer 37 saves / 39 shots		Goalie stats	Martin Jones 21 saves / 22 shots

May 6	San Jose Sharks	3–4	OT	Colorado Avalanche	Pepsi Center	Recap
No scoring		First period		No scoring
Marc-Edouard Vlasic (2) – 14:36; Brent Burns (5) – 19:50		Second period		04:05 – Tyson Jost (2); 18:44 – J. T. Compher (3)
Marc-Edouard Vlasic (3) – 17:32		Third period		04:00 – J. T. Compher (4)
No scoring		First overtime period		02:32 – Gabriel Landeskog (3)
Martin Jones 22 saves / 26 shots		Goalie stats		Philipp Grubauer 19 saves / 22 shots

May 8	Colorado Avalanche	2–3	San Jose Sharks	SAP Center	Recap
Mikko Rantanen (6) – 19:53		First period	05:57 – Joe Pavelski (3); 11:35 – Tomas Hertl (9)
No scoring		Second period	12:37 – Joonas Donskoi (1)
Tyson Jost (3) – 00:51		Third period	No scoring
Philipp Grubauer 24 saves / 27 shots		Goalie stats	Martin Jones 27 saves / 29 shots

San Jose won series 4–3

== Conference finals ==
=== Eastern Conference final ===
==== (A2) Boston Bruins vs. (WC1) Carolina Hurricanes ====
This was the fifth playoff meeting between these two teams with Boston winning three of the four previous series. They last met in the 2009 Eastern Conference semifinals which Carolina won in seven games. This was Boston's eighth appearance in the conference finals. They last went to the conference finals in 2013, which they won against the Pittsburgh Penguins in a four-game sweep. This was Carolina's fourth Conference finals appearance. They last went to the conference finals in 2009; they lost in a four-game sweep to Pittsburgh. Boston won two of the three games in this year's regular season series.

The Bruins defeated the Hurricanes in a four-game sweep. In game one, the Bruins scored two power-play goals 28 seconds apart in the third period to win 5–2. Charlie Coyle and Torey Krug both had three assists in the Bruins 6–2 victory in game two. In game three, Bruins goalie Tuukka Rask made 35 saves in Boston's close 2–1 victory, taking a 3–0 series lead. Patrice Bergeron scored twice and notched an assist, David Pastrnak had a goal and two assists, and Rask stopped all 24 shots he faced in the Bruins 4–0 game four victory, sending the Bruins to the Stanley Cup Final.

May 9	Carolina Hurricanes	2–5	Boston Bruins	TD Garden	Recap
Sebastian Aho (5) – pp – 03:42		First period	02:55 – Steven Kampfer (1)
Greg McKegg (2) – 09:18		Second period	No scoring
No scoring		Third period	02:26 – pp – Marcus Johansson (3); 02:54 – pp – Patrice Bergeron (6); 17:47 – en – Charlie Coyle (6); 17:58 – Chris Wagner (1)
Petr Mrazek 23 saves / 27 shots		Goalie stats	Tuukka Rask 29 saves / 31 shots

May 12	Carolina Hurricanes	2–6	Boston Bruins	TD Garden	Recap
No scoring		First period	15:22 – Matt Grzelcyk (2); 18:32 – pp – Jake DeBrusk (3)
No scoring		Second period	03:46 – Connor Clifton (1); 17:56 – pp – Matt Grzelcyk (3)
Justin Williams (4) – 11:17; Teuvo Teravainen (7) – 17:32		Third period	01:10 – David Backes (2); 04:32 – Danton Heinen (2)
Petr Mrazek 19 saves / 25 shots		Goalie stats	Tuukka Rask 21 saves / 23 shots

May 14	Boston Bruins	2–1	Carolina Hurricanes	PNC Arena	Recap
No scoring		First period	No scoring
Chris Wagner (2) – 01:21; Brad Marchand (6) – pp – 06:28		Second period	13:48 – Calvin de Haan (1)
No scoring		Third period	No scoring
Tuukka Rask 35 saves / 36 shots		Goalie stats	Curtis McElhinney 29 saves / 31 shots

May 16	Boston Bruins	4–0	Carolina Hurricanes	PNC Arena	Recap
No scoring		First period	No scoring
David Pastrnak (7) – pp – 04:46; Patrice Bergeron (7) – pp – 18:34		Second period	No scoring
Patrice Bergeron (8) – 10:32; Brad Marchand (7) – en – 17:43		Third period	No scoring
Tuukka Rask 24 saves / 24 shots		Goalie stats	Curtis McElhinney 19 saves / 22 shots

Boston won series 4–0

=== Western Conference final ===
==== (P2) San Jose Sharks vs. (C3) St. Louis Blues ====
This was the sixth playoff meeting between these two teams with San Jose winning three of the five previous series. This was St. Louis' fourth Conference finals appearance and San Jose's fifth appearance in the conference finals. This also marked the thirteenth conference final in the last sixteen seasons that included a California-based team. The teams' last playoff meeting and appearance in the conference finals was against each other in 2016, which San Jose won in six games. San Jose won two of the three games in this year's regular season series.

The Blues defeated the Sharks in six games. In game one, Logan Couture and Timo Meier both scored twice in the Sharks' 6–3 victory. Although Couture scored twice in game two, the Blues edged the Sharks 4–2. In game three, controversy struck in overtime as Meier swatted at the puck with his glove towards Erik Karlsson who scored in overtime. The NHL later admitted the refs missed the hand pass Meier committed. The Blues were undeterred by this blatant non-call as goalie Jordan Binnington made 29 saves in game four en route to a 2–1 victory. In game five, Jaden Schwartz scored a hat trick and Binnington stopped all 21 shots he faced for the Blues in a 5–0 victory. The Blues shut down the Sharks in game six, scoring five goals in a 5–1 victory and advancing to the Stanley Cup Final and ending its 49-year appearance drought.

May 11	St. Louis Blues	3–6	San Jose Sharks	SAP Center	Recap
Joel Edmundson (1) – 09:13		First period	03:31 – Logan Couture (10); 11:24 – pp – Joe Pavelski (4)
Ryan O'Reilly (3) – 08:58		Second period	07:41 – Kevin Labanc (4); 10:24 – Timo Meier (4); 17:34 – Timo Meier (5)
Tyler Bozak (3) – 13:01		Third period	17:39 – en – Logan Couture (11)
Jordan Binnington 19 saves / 24 shots		Goalie stats	Martin Jones 28 saves / 31 shots

May 13	St. Louis Blues	4–2	San Jose Sharks	SAP Center	Recap
Jaden Schwartz (9) – 02:34		First period	No scoring
Vince Dunn (2) – 04:16; Robert Bortuzzo (1) – 16:34		Second period	04:55 – sh – Logan Couture (12); 06:54 – Logan Couture (13)
Oskar Sundqvist (3) – 16:52		Third period	No scoring
Jordan Binnington 24 saves / 26 shots		Goalie stats	Martin Jones 21 saves / 25 shots

May 15	San Jose Sharks	5–4	OT	St. Louis Blues	Enterprise Center	Recap
Erik Karlsson (1) – 13:37; Joe Thornton (3) – 16:58		First period		No scoring
Joe Thornton (4) – 01:36		Second period		01:18 – Alexander Steen (2); 04:05 – Vladimir Tarasenko (6); 16:03 – David Perron (4); 18:42 – pp – David Perron (5)
Logan Couture (14) – 18:59		Third period		No scoring
Erik Karlsson (2) – 05:23		First overtime period		No scoring
Martin Jones 28 saves / 32 shots		Goalie stats		Jordan Binnington 27 saves / 32 shots

May 17	San Jose Sharks	1–2	St. Louis Blues	Enterprise Center	Recap
No scoring		First period	00:35 – Ivan Barbashev (1); 17:53 – pp – Tyler Bozak (4)
No scoring		Second period	No scoring
Tomas Hertl (10) – pp – 06:48		Third period	No scoring
Martin Jones 20 saves / 22 shots		Goalie stats	Jordan Binnington 29 saves / 30 shots

May 19	St. Louis Blues	5–0	San Jose Sharks	SAP Center	Recap
Oskar Sundqvist (4) – 05:50		First period	No scoring
Jaden Schwartz (10) – 03:05; Vladimir Tarasenko (7) – ps – 06:53		Second period	No scoring
Jaden Schwartz (11) – pp – 02:19; Jaden Schwartz (12) – 16:02		Third period	No scoring
Jordan Binnington 21 saves / 21 shots		Goalie stats	Martin Jones 35 saves / 40 shots

May 21	San Jose Sharks	1–5	St. Louis Blues	Enterprise Center	Recap
No scoring		First period	01:32 – David Perron (6); 16:16 – pp – Vladimir Tarasenko (8)
Dylan Gambrell (1) – 06:40		Second period	12:47 – pp – Brayden Schenn (2)
No scoring		Third period	13:05 – Tyler Bozak (5); 17:45 – en – Ivan Barbashev (2)
Martin Jones 14 saves / 18 shots		Goalie stats	Jordan Binnington 25 saves / 26 shots

St. Louis won series 4–2

== Stanley Cup Final ==
This was the third playoff meeting between these two teams, with Boston winning both previous series. They last met in the 1972 Stanley Cup semifinals which Boston won in a four-game sweep. St. Louis made their fourth appearance in the Final. They last advanced to the Final in 1970, which they lost in four games to the Boston Bruins. Boston made their twentieth Final appearance. They last advanced to the Final in 2013, which they lost in six games to the Chicago Blackhawks. These teams split the two games in this year's regular season series.

May 27	St. Louis Blues	2–4	Boston Bruins	TD Garden	Recap
Brayden Schenn (3) – 07:23		First period	No scoring
Vladimir Tarasenko (9) – 01:00		Second period	02:16 – Connor Clifton (2); 12:41 – pp – Charlie McAvoy (2)
No scoring		Third period	05:21 – Sean Kuraly (3); 18:11 – en – Brad Marchand (8)
Jordan Binnington 34 saves / 37 shots		Goalie stats	Tuukka Rask 18 saves / 20 shots

May 29	St. Louis Blues	3–2	OT	Boston Bruins	TD Garden	Recap
Robert Bortuzzo (2) – 09:37; Vladimir Tarasenko (10) – 14:55		First period		04:44 – pp – Charlie Coyle (7); 10:17 – Joakim Nordstrom (3)
No scoring		Second period		No scoring
No scoring		Third period		No scoring
Carl Gunnarsson (1) – 03:51		First overtime period		No scoring
Jordan Binnington 21 saves / 23 shots		Goalie stats		Tuukka Rask 34 saves / 37 shots

June 1	Boston Bruins	7–2	St. Louis Blues	Enterprise Center	Recap
Patrice Bergeron (9) – pp – 10:47; Charlie Coyle (8) – 17:40; Sean Kuraly (4) – 19:50		First period	No scoring
David Pastrnak (8) – pp – 00:41; Torey Krug (2) – pp – 12:12		Second period	11:05 – Ivan Barbashev (3)
Noel Acciari (2) – en – 18:12; Marcus Johansson (4) – pp – 18:35		Third period	05:24 – pp – Colton Parayko (2)
Tuukka Rask 27 saves / 29 shots		Goalie stats	Jordan Binnington 14 saves / 19 shots Jake Allen 3 saves / 4 shots

June 3	Boston Bruins	2–4	St. Louis Blues	Enterprise Center	Recap
Charlie Coyle (9) – 13:14		First period	00:43 – Ryan O'Reilly (4); 15:30 – Vladimir Tarasenko (11)
Brandon Carlo (1) – sh – 14:19		Second period	No scoring
No scoring		Third period	10:38 – Ryan O'Reilly (5); 18:31 – en – Brayden Schenn (4)
Tuukka Rask 34 saves / 37 shots		Goalie stats	Jordan Binnington 21 saves / 23 shots

June 6	St. Louis Blues	2–1	Boston Bruins	TD Garden	Recap
No scoring		First period	No scoring
Ryan O'Reilly (6) – 00:55		Second period	No scoring
David Perron (7) – 10:36		Third period	13:32 – Jake DeBrusk (4)
Jordan Binnington 38 saves / 39 shots		Goalie stats	Tuukka Rask 19 saves / 21 shots

June 9	Boston Bruins	5–1	St. Louis Blues	Enterprise Center	Recap
Brad Marchand (9) – pp – 08:40		First period	No scoring
No scoring		Second period	No scoring
Brandon Carlo (2) – 02:31; Karson Kuhlman (1) – 10:15; David Pastrnak (9) – 14:06; Zdeno Chara (2) – en – 17:41		Third period	12:01 – Ryan O'Reilly (7)
Tuukka Rask 28 saves / 29 shots		Goalie stats	Jordan Binnington 27 saves / 31 shots

June 12	St. Louis Blues	4–1	Boston Bruins	TD Garden	Recap
Ryan O'Reilly (8) – 16:47; Alex Pietrangelo (3) – 19:52		First period	No scoring
No scoring		Second period	No scoring
Brayden Schenn (5) – 11:25; Zach Sanford (1) – 15:22		Third period	17:50 – Matt Grzelcyk (4)
Jordan Binnington 32 saves / 33 shots		Goalie stats	Tuukka Rask 16 saves / 20 shots

St. Louis won series 4–3

== Player statistics ==
=== Skaters ===
These are the top ten skaters based on points.

Player	Team	GP	G	A	Pts	+/–	PIM
Brad Marchand	Boston Bruins	24	9	14	23	+4	14
Ryan O'Reilly	St. Louis Blues	26	8	15	23	+2	4
Logan Couture	San Jose Sharks	20	14	6	20	+3	6
Jaden Schwartz	St. Louis Blues	26	12	8	20	+9	2
David Pastrnak	Boston Bruins	24	9	10	19	0	4
Alex Pietrangelo	St. Louis Blues	26	3	16	19	+5	12
Torey Krug	Boston Bruins	24	2	16	18	+4	10
Vladimir Tarasenko	St. Louis Blues	26	11	6	17	–5	4
Patrice Bergeron	Boston Bruins	24	9	8	17	+4	12
Charlie Coyle	Boston Bruins	24	9	7	16	+8	12

=== Goaltenders ===
St. Louis Blues goaltender Jordan Binnington set an NHL record for rookie goaltenders with 16 wins, beating the previous record held by Patrick Roy. This is a combined table of the top five goaltenders based on goals against average and the top five goaltenders based on save percentage, with at least 420 minutes played. The table is sorted by GAA, and the criteria for inclusion are bolded.

Player	Team	GP	W	L	SA	GA	GAA	SV%	SO	TOI
Robin Lehner	New York Islanders	8	4	4	233	15	**2.00**	**.936**	0	449:00
Tuukka Rask	Boston Bruins	24	15	9	742	49	**2.02**	**.934**	2	1,458:50
Ben Bishop	Dallas Stars	13	7	6	448	30	**2.22**	**.933**	0	810:59
Philipp Grubauer	Colorado Avalanche	12	7	5	373	28	**2.30**	**.925**	1	731:47
Sergei Bobrovsky	Columbus Blue Jackets	10	6	4	333	25	**2.41**	**.925**	0	622:56

== Television ==
This was the eighth postseason under NBC Sports' current 10-year contract for American television rights to the NHL. All national coverage of games are being aired on either NBCSN, the NBC broadcast network, NHL Network, USA Network, or CNBC. During the first round, excluding games exclusively broadcast on NBC, the regional rights holders of each participating U.S. team produced local telecasts of their respective games. For the third year, the first round national broadcasts were not blacked out on television in the markets of participating teams, and could co-exist with the local broadcasts (however, NBC-provided coverage was restricted in Pittsburgh and Las Vegas, where AT&T SportsNet held the regional rights to the Penguins and the Golden Knights respectively).

In Canada, this marked the fifth postseason under Rogers Media's 12-year contract. Games aired across Sportsnet, SN1, SN360, FX, and CBC under the Hockey Night in Canada brand. Games were also streamed on Sportsnet Now, CBCSports.ca (for games televised by CBC), or the subscription service Rogers NHL Live.

French-language coverage of all games aired in Canada on TVA Sports. Availability of the games were initially hampered by a major carriage dispute between Bell Satellite TV and the channel's owner, Quebecor Media, over a proposed increase in carriage fees which Bell considered poorly-justified. On April 10, 2019, Quebecor pulled TVA Sports from Bell Satellite TV, despite it being illegal in Canada for channels to be pulled by their owners at a "standstill" in carriage negotiations. Bell publicly condemned the action, and stated it would offer the Sportsnet networks as a free preview to affected subscribers for the duration of the dispute, so that viewers still have access to the English-language broadcasts. On April 12, 2019, the channels were restored per a court injunction granted to Bell. The CRTC has since warned that any attempt to pull the channel again would result in a suspension of its license until access is restored.

In the United States, NBC reported that the first round saw its highest cable viewership since 1994 and the highest overall ratings since 2012. Game seven of the Capitals–Hurricanes series was the most-watched first round game on cable since 2000.

Preceded by 2018 Stanley Cup playoffs	Stanley Cup playoffs 2019	Succeeded by 2020 Stanley Cup playoffs
