= Tomáš Hertl =

Czech ice hockey player (born 1993)

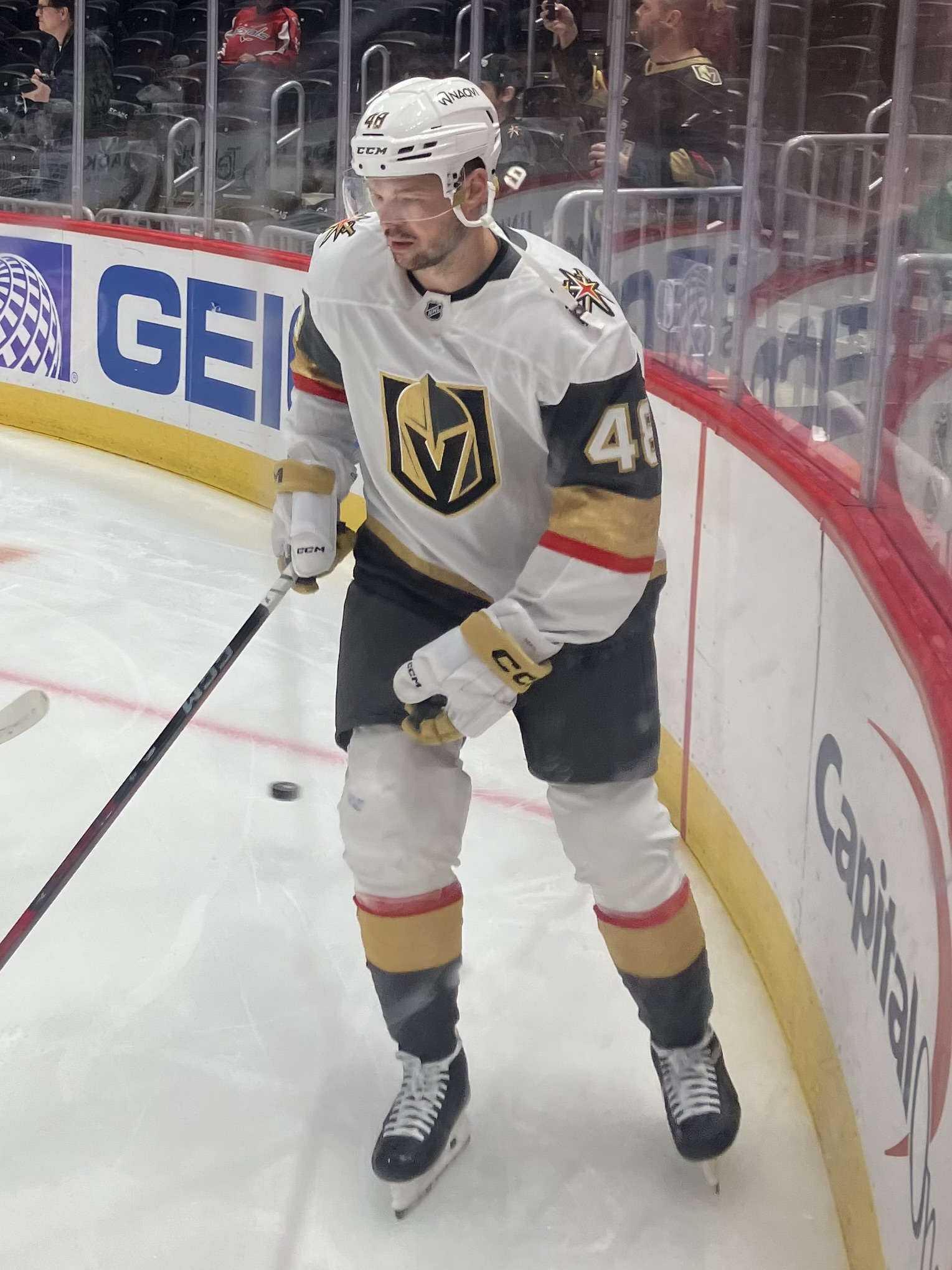
- Hertl with the Vegas Golden Knights in 2024
- Born: 12 November 1993 (age 33) Prague, Czech Republic
- Height: 6 ft 3 in (191 cm)
- Weight: 215 lb (98 kg; 15 st 5 lb)
- Position: Forward
- Shoots: Left
- NHL team Former teams: Vegas Golden Knights; HC Slavia Praha; San Jose Sharks
- National team: Czech Republic
- NHL draft: 17th overall, 2012; San Jose Sharks
- Playing career: 2011–present

Tomáš Hertl (born 12 November 1993) is a Czech professional ice hockey player who is a forward for the Vegas Golden Knights of the National Hockey League (NHL). Hertl was selected 17th overall in the 2012 NHL entry draft by the San Jose Sharks, with whom he spent his first 11 seasons. Prior to being drafted, Hertl played for HC Slavia Praha of the Czech Extraliga (ELH).

He is the first player born in the modern Czech Republic after the dissolution of Czechoslovakia to appear in an NHL game.

== Playing career ==
=== Early career ===
Hertl started his playing career with HC Slavia Praha in the Czech Extraliga, playing on the U18 and U20 squads in 2009–10. He was the third-highest scorer on the U20 team, scoring 12 goals and 26 assists. On the under-18 team, Hertl scored 13 goals and 10 assists. The next season, Hertl was among four players on the U20 team with 40+ points; Hertl had 14 goals and 27 assists. In 2011–12, Hertl was the fourth-leading scorer for Slavia, with 11 goals and 15 assists.

The NHL Central Scouting Bureau ranked Hertl fifth among European skaters before the 2012 NHL entry draft. Sports Illustrated's Allan Muir ranked Hertl as the 18th best prospect in the 2012 draft. ISS Hockey listed Hertl as the 32nd best, while The Hockey News and TSN scout Craig Button listed him as the 24th and 22nd best player, respectively. Among Hertl's advantages include his large body and a good physical and defensive play, which Muir compared to Martin Hanzal. However, Muir also wrote, "Hertl's not the most agile skater or finisher, and he has a tendency to try to do too much." Button stated that Hertl, although not particularly fast, his agility compensates for his speed; Hertl is also an effective passer and when "given the opportunity to shoot, he can be dangerous."

Hertl was drafted by the San Jose Sharks with 17th overall pick in the 2012 draft, and became the first European player drafted with the Sharks' top pick since Czech Lukáš Kašpar was drafted in 2004. After being drafted, Hertl rejoined Slavia, scoring 30 points in 43 games.

=== San Jose Sharks ===
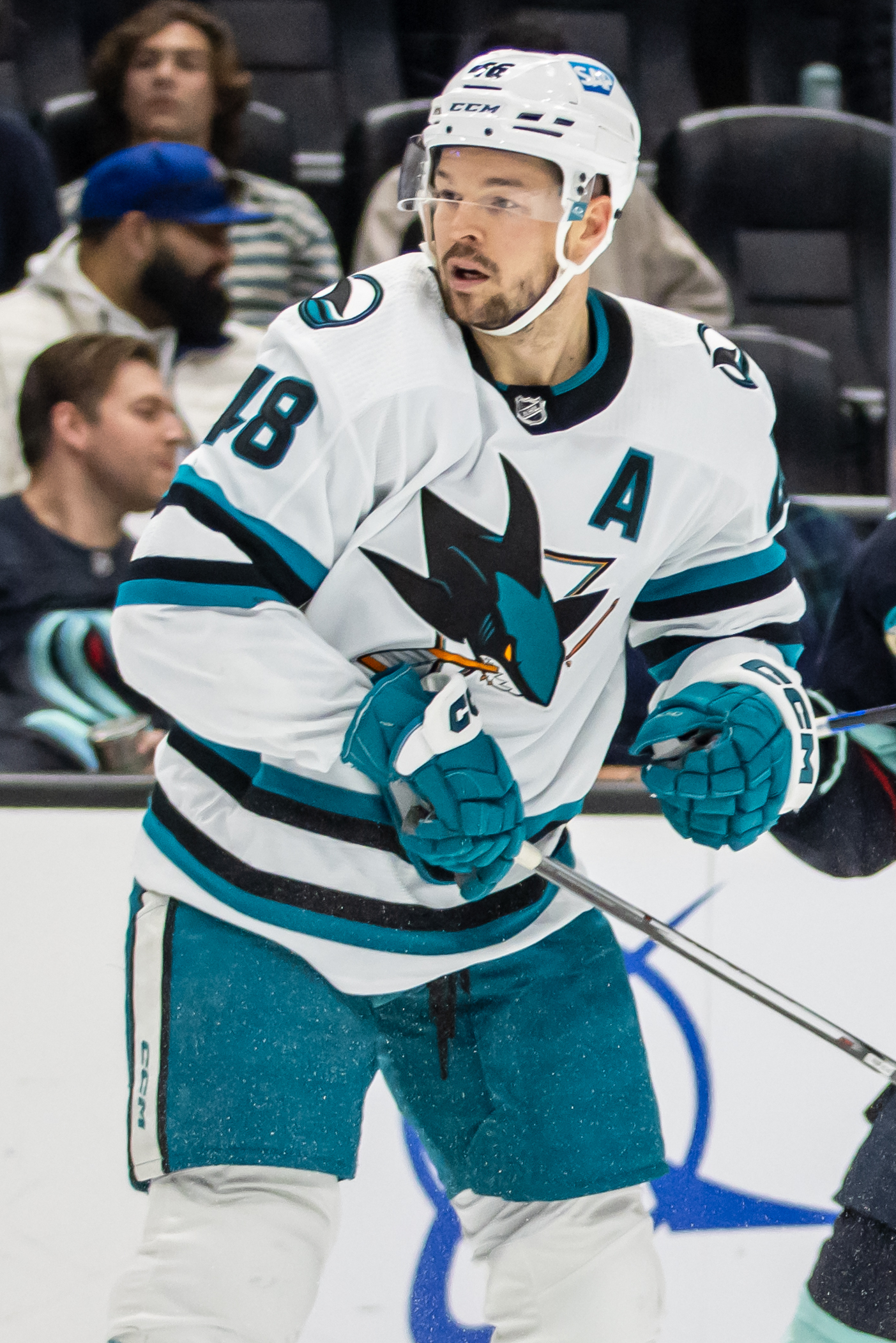
Hertl with the San Jose Sharks in 2023

The Sharks officially signed Hertl to a three-year, entry-level contract on 3 June 2013. In the preseason, Hertl scored 3 goals and 1 assist, and joined Joe Thornton and Brent Burns on a line, filling the hole created by Raffi Torres' injury. Hertl made his NHL debut against the Vancouver Canucks on 3 October, 2013 and tallied his first career point with an assist on a goal by Brent Burns. At age 19, Hertl became the first teenager to play in a season opener for the Sharks since Marc-Édouard Vlasic in 2006. Hertl scored his first two NHL goals in the next game on 5 October 2013, against Mike Smith of the Phoenix Coyotes; Hertl became the youngest player to score two goals for the Sharks in one game since Patrick Marleau on 17 March 1999. On 8 October 2013, Hertl registered 4 goals against the New York Rangers in a 9–2 victory, making him the fourth youngest player in the NHL to record a four-goal game (19 years, 330 days old) after Jimmy Carson did in the 1987–88 NHL season with the Los Angeles Kings (19 years, 254 days old). Hertl also became the first Shark to score four goals in one game since Owen Nolan in 1995. Hertl was eventually named the October Rookie of the Month, scoring eight goals, which led all rookies, and 11 points in 13 games. However, on 19 December against the Kings, Hertl injured his knee after a collision with Dustin Brown and was reported to miss at least a month. Hertl had surgery on his MCL and PCL in his right knee on 31 December. A former NHL trainer stated that the "best-case scenario" for Hertl's return was approximately 12 weeks, though Kevin Kurz of CSN Bay Area wrote that Hertl could be out for six-to-nine months. On 11 April 2014, Hertl was cleared to return to the Sharks against the Colorado Avalanche, ending a 45-game absence. On 17 April, against the Kings, Hertl scored his first career playoff goal.

On 29 June 2016, at the conclusion of his entry-level contract, Hertl agreed to a two-year, $6 million extension to remain with the Sharks. He signed a four-year contract extension with the Sharks on 2 July 2018. During the 2018–19 season, Hertl posted 74 points in 77 games as the Sharks advanced to the 2019 Stanley Cup playoffs. The Sharks faced off against the Vegas Golden Knights in the first round and in Game 6, Hertl scored a short-handed goal in double overtime to force a Game 7, which the Sharks won 5–4 in overtime. Following this, the Sharks beat the Colorado Avalanche, also in seven games, before being defeated by the St. Louis Blues in the Western Conference Finals.

In January 2020, Hertl participated in the 2020 National Hockey League All-Star Game as an alternate following an injury to teammate Logan Couture. In the Pacific Division's 10–5 semifinal victory over the Central Division, Hertl became the first Sharks player to score four goals in an All-Star Game. On 29 January, he left the Sharks' game against the Canucks with what was revealed to be season-ending tears to the ACL and MCL.

On 16 March 2022, he signed an eight-year contract extension with the Sharks.

=== Vegas Golden Knights ===
On 8 March 2024, Hertl, along with 2025 and 2027 third-round picks, was traded to the Vegas Golden Knights for prospect David Edstrom and a 2025 first-round pick. On 8 April, Hertl played his first game for Vegas, recording an assist in a 4–3 loss to the Vancouver Canucks.

== International play ==
Medal record

Men's ice hockey

Representing the Czech Republic

World Championships
Bronze medal – third place	2022 Finland	

Hertl joined the Czech Republic at the 2011 IIHF World U18 Championships, scoring one goal, as the team finished eighth. The next year, Hertl participated in the 2012 World Junior Ice Hockey Championships for the Czechs, scoring three goals and two assists, with the team finishing fifth. He eventually played in the 2013 edition, in which the Czech team finished fifth.

Hertl played with the Czech Republic at the 2013 IIHF World Championship, where he was the youngest player on the team. Due to the knee injury against the Kings in December 2013, Hertl was forced to have surgery and missed out on participating in the 2014 Sochi Olympics. Hertl returned to the Czech team for the 2015 IIHF World Championship.

Hertl was selected to play for the Czech Republic in the 2016 World Cup. He played in the 2022 IIHF World Championship, where the Czech team won bronze. He was also selected for the 2026 Winter Olympics in Milan, Italy.

== Personal life ==
Hertl and his wife have two sons.

== Career statistics ==
=== Regular season and playoffs ===
			Regular season					Playoffs
Season	Team	League	GP	G	A	Pts	PIM	GP	G	A	Pts	PIM
2008–09	HC Slavia Praha	CZE U18	35	16	15	31	12	8	5	2	7	4
2009–10	HC Slavia Praha	CZE U18	7	13	10	23	8	5	5	6	11	31
2009–10	HC Slavia Praha	CZE U20	42	12	26	38	12	4	1	0	1	2
2010–11	HC Slavia Praha	CZE U18	4	2	6	8	0	—	—	—	—	—
2010–11	HC Slavia Praha	CZE U20	33	14	27	41	49	4	4	2	6	0
2010–11	HC Slavia Praha	ELH	1	0	0	0	0	—	—	—	—	—
2011–12	HC Slavia Praha	ELH	38	12	13	25	22	—	—	—	—	—
2011–12	HC Slovan Ústečtí Lvi	Czech.1	—	—	—	—	—	3	2	0	2	2
2012–13	HC Slavia Praha	ELH	43	18	12	30	16	11	3	5	8	0
2013–14	San Jose Sharks	NHL	37	15	10	25	4	7	2	3	5	2
2014–15	San Jose Sharks	NHL	82	13	18	31	16	—	—	—	—	—
2014–15	Worcester Sharks	AHL	2	0	2	2	0	—	—	—	—	—
2015–16	San Jose Sharks	NHL	81	21	25	46	26	20	6	5	11	4
2016–17	San Jose Sharks	NHL	49	10	12	22	14	6	0	2	2	2
2017–18	San Jose Sharks	NHL	79	22	24	46	41	10	6	3	9	8
2018–19	San Jose Sharks	NHL	77	35	39	74	18	19	10	5	15	4
2019–20	San Jose Sharks	NHL	48	16	20	36	16	—	—	—	—	—
2020–21	San Jose Sharks	NHL	50	19	24	43	27	—	—	—	—	—
2021–22	San Jose Sharks	NHL	82	30	34	64	16	—	—	—	—	—
2022–23	San Jose Sharks	NHL	79	22	41	63	42	—	—	—	—	—
2023–24	San Jose Sharks	NHL	48	15	19	34	22	—	—	—	—	—
2023–24	Vegas Golden Knights	NHL	6	2	2	4	0	7	1	0	1	2
2024–25	Vegas Golden Knights	NHL	73	32	29	61	20	11	3	2	5	0
2025–26	Vegas Golden Knights	NHL	82	24	34	58	39	22	5	9	14	6
ELH totals			82	30	25	55	38	11	3	5	8	0
NHL totals			873	276	331	607	315	102	33	29	62	28

=== International ===
Year	Team	Event	Result	GP	G	A	Pts	PIM
2011	Czech Republic	U18	8th	6	1	0	1	12
2012	Czech Republic	WJC	5th	6	3	2	5	0
2013	Czech Republic	WJC	5th	6	2	3	5	10
2013	Czech Republic	WC	7th	8	0	0	0	0
2014	Czech Republic	WC	4th	9	3	3	6	4
2015	Czech Republic	WC	4th	8	1	2	3	2
2022	Czechia	WC	3rd place, bronze medalist(s)	10	1	4	5	12
2026	Czechia	OG	8th	5	0	1	1	6
Junior totals				18	6	5	11	22
Senior totals				40	5	10	15	24

== Awards and honors ==
Award	Year	Ref
NHL
NHL All-Star Game	2020, 2024	

Awards and achievements
Preceded by Charlie Coyle	San Jose Sharks first-round draft pick 2012	Succeeded by Mirco Müller
