= Kevin Labanc =

American ice hockey player (born 1995)

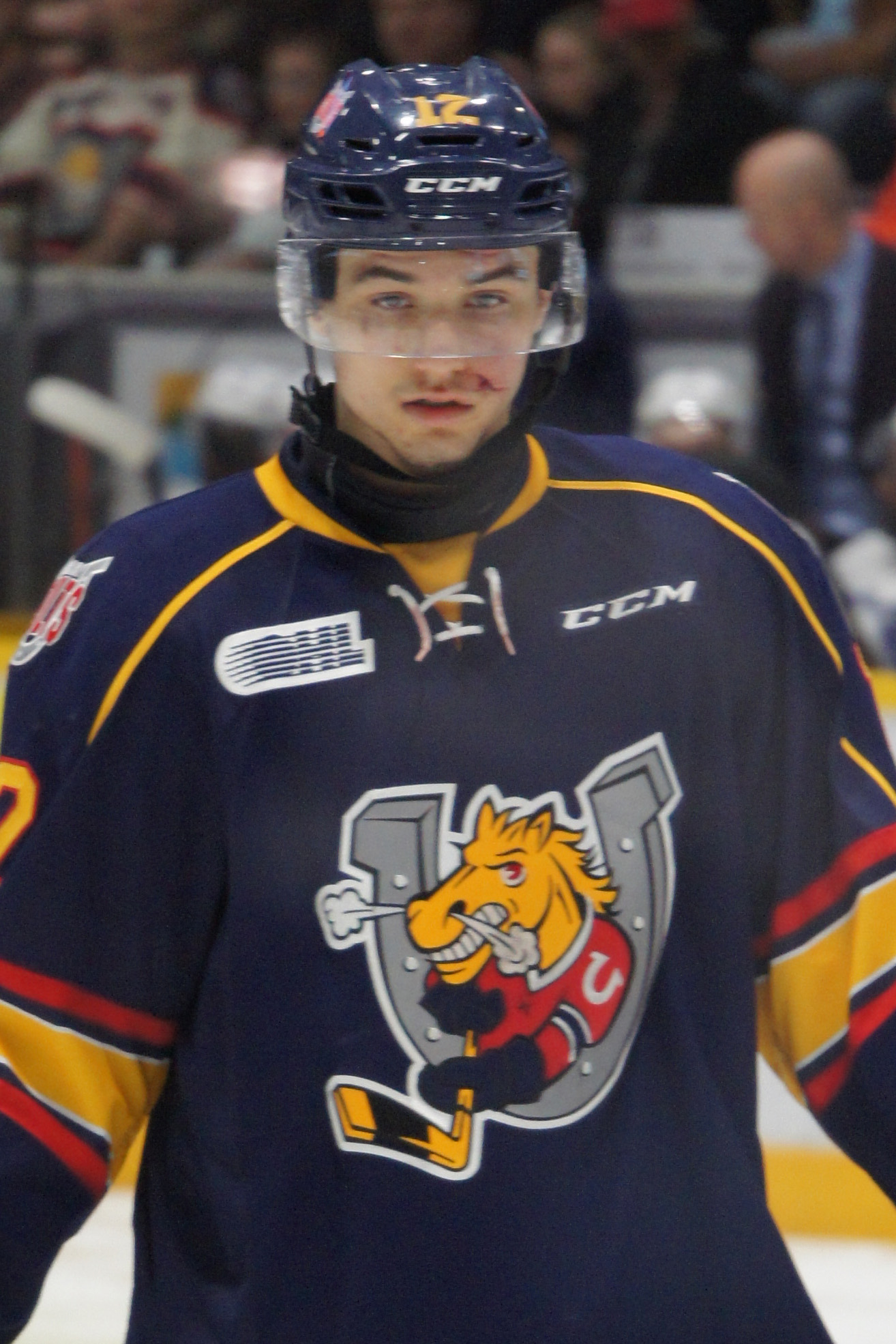
- Labanc with the Barrie Colts in 2016
- Born: December 12, 1995 (age 30) Staten Island, New York, U.S.
- Height: 5 ft 11 in (180 cm)
- Weight: 185 lb (84 kg; 13 st 3 lb)
- Position: Right wing
- Shoots: Right
- KHL team Former teams: Shanghai Dragons; San Jose Sharks; Columbus Blue Jackets
- National team: United States
- NHL draft: 171st overall, 2014; San Jose Sharks
- Playing career: 2016–present

Kevin Labanc (born December 12, 1995) is an American professional ice hockey right winger for the Shanghai Dragons of the Kontinental Hockey League. He formerly played for the San Jose Sharks and Columbus Blue Jackets in the National Hockey League. San Jose drafted him in the sixth round, 171st overall, of the 2014 NHL entry draft.

== Playing career ==
Labanc got his first taste of hockey at the Staten Island Skating Pavilion. As a youth, he played in the 2008 Quebec International Pee-Wee Hockey Tournament with the New Jersey Devils minor ice hockey team. He later played amateur junior hockey in New Jersey through the Youth Hockey League, to the Atlantic Junior Hockey League with the New Jersey Rockets before he was selected to play in the U.S. National Development Team Program through the United States Hockey League.

At the conclusion of his tenure in the U.S. Development Program, Labanc opted to forgo collegiate hockey and pursue a major junior career in the Ontario Hockey League with the Barrie Colts. He was originally drafted by the Colts in the 2011 Priority Selection in the sixth round, 103rd overall. He scored 35 points in 65 games as a rookie in the 2013–14 season with the Colts and was drafted by the San Jose Sharks in the 2014 NHL entry draft, 171st overall.

In the following two seasons with the Colts, Labanc broke out offensively with back-to-back 100-point seasons. In the 2015–16 season, his overage year, Labanc led the Colts and the League with 88 assists and 127 points. He was awarded the Leo Lalonde Memorial Trophy and the Jim Mahon Memorial Trophy as the top scoring right winger in the OHL. He completed his junior career with the Colts amongst franchise leader's in points-per-game games and finished fourth overall in scoring with 269 points in just 198 games.

On March 9, 2016, Labanc was signed by the San Jose Sharks to a three-year entry-level contract. He was assigned to join the team's AHL affiliate, the San Jose Barracuda, for their post-season run, making his professional debut in a solitary game.

After attending the Sharks' training camp in preparation for his first full professional season in 2016–17, Labanc was assigned to begin the year with the Barracuda. After scoring 10 points in just 6 games in the AHL, Labanc received his first recall to the San Jose Sharks on November 7, 2016. He made his debut, featuring on a scoring line, alongside Logan Couture and Joonas Donskoi, in a 3–0 victory over the Washington Capitals on November 8. In his fifth game, Labanc scored his first NHL goal, assisted by Joe Thornton, against Jake Allen, in a 3–2 defeat to the St. Louis Blues on November 17, 2016.

On February 9, 2019, Labanc scored his first NHL hat-trick in a 5–2 victory against the Edmonton Oilers. He finished the 2018–19 season with 17 goals and 56 points in 82 games. In Game 7 of the Sharks' first-round series against the Vegas Golden Knights, Labanc contributed on all four Sharks' third period goals (one goal and three assists). The team eventually won the game in overtime, advancing to the second round. The feat made Labanc the first player in NHL postseason history to record four points in a single period of a Game 7. For the 2019 postseason, the Sharks were eliminated in six games by the eventual champions, the St. Louis Blues, during the Western Conference Finals. Overall, Labanc recorded four goals and five assists in 20 games.

On July 8, 2019, the Sharks re-signed Labanc to a one-year, $1 million contract extension.

On October 10, 2020, the Sharks re-signed Labanc to a four-year, $18.9 million contract extension.

As an unrestricted free agent during the 2024 offseason, Labanc went un-signed over the summer before accepting an invitation to attend the New Jersey Devils training camp for the 2024–25 season on a professional tryout on September 16, 2024. Following a preseason with New Jersey in which he scored six goals in four games, Labanc signed a one-year contract with the Columbus Blue Jackets on October 5, 2024.

Ahead of the 2025–26 season, Labanc joined the Carolina Hurricanes on a professional tryout, but was cut near the end of the preseason.

On October 8, 2025, Labanc was signed by the Shanghai Dragons to play for the remainder of the 2025–26 KHL season.

== Personal life ==
Kevin Labanc is the son of Milan Labanc, a former Slovak professional ice hockey player and his wife Anika. They emigrated from Slovakia to the United States in 1994 and settled in Brooklyn. He speaks Slovak.

== Career statistics ==
=== Regular season and playoffs ===
			Regular season					Playoffs
Season	Team	League	GP	G	A	Pts	PIM	GP	G	A	Pts	PIM
2009–10	New Jersey Colonials	AYBHL	37	18	41	59	24	—	—	—	—	—
2010–11	New Jersey Rockets	MetJHL	36	13	33	46	16	2	1	0	1	0
2010–11	New Jersey Rockets	AtJHL	5	1	0	1	2	—	—	—	—	—
2011–12	U.S. NTDP Juniors	USHL	33	3	8	11	10	2	0	0	0	2
2011–12	U.S. NTDP U17	USDP	52	5	17	22	24	—	—	—	—	—
2012–13	U.S. NTDP Juniors	USHL	26	3	6	9	8	—	—	—	—	—
2012–13	U.S. NTDP U17	USDP	5	0	2	2	2	—	—	—	—	—
2012–13	U.S. NTDP U18	USDP	62	9	12	21	28	—	—	—	—	—
2013–14	Barrie Colts	OHL	65	11	24	35	30	11	3	4	7	4
2014–15	Barrie Colts	OHL	68	31	76	107	55	9	2	4	6	8
2015–16	Barrie Colts	OHL	65	39	88	127	70	15	6	20	26	28
2015–16	San Jose Barracuda	AHL	—	—	—	—	—	1	0	0	0	0
2016–17	San Jose Barracuda	AHL	19	6	13	19	24	15	3	4	7	6
2016–17	San Jose Sharks	NHL	55	8	12	20	22	—	—	—	—	—
2017–18	San Jose Sharks	NHL	77	11	29	40	32	10	1	4	5	2
2017–18	San Jose Barracuda	AHL	2	1	3	4	2	—	—	—	—	—
2018–19	San Jose Sharks	NHL	82	17	39	56	36	20	4	5	9	14
2019–20	San Jose Sharks	NHL	70	14	19	33	38	—	—	—	—	—
2020–21	San Jose Sharks	NHL	55	12	16	28	31	—	—	—	—	—
2021–22	San Jose Sharks	NHL	21	3	3	6	6	—	—	—	—	—
2022–23	San Jose Sharks	NHL	72	15	18	33	36	—	—	—	—	—
2023–24	San Jose Sharks	NHL	46	2	7	9	16	—	—	—	—	—
2024–25	Columbus Blue Jackets	NHL	34	2	10	12	12	—	—	—	—	—
2025–26	Shanghai Dragons	KHL	55	15	19	34	60	—	—	—	—	—
NHL totals			512	84	153	237	229	30	5	9	14	16
KHL totals			55	15	19	34	60	—	—	—	—	—

Medal record

Representing United States

Ice hockey

World Championships
Bronze medal – third place	2021 Latvia	

=== International ===
Year	Team	Event	Result	GP	G	A	Pts	PIM
2012	United States	U17	2nd place, silver medalist(s)	6	0	0	0	4
2013	United States	WJC18	2nd place, silver medalist(s)	7	1	0	1	0
2021	United States	WC	3rd place, bronze medalist(s)	10	2	4	6	0
Junior totals				13	1	0	1	4
Senior totals				10	2	4	6	0

== Awards and honours ==
Award	Year
OHL
Second All-Star Team	2016
Best P Plus–minus	2016
Eddie Powers Memorial Trophy	2016
Leo Lalonde Memorial Trophy	2016
Jim Mahon Memorial Trophy	2016
