= Logan Couture =

Canadian ice hockey player (born 1989)

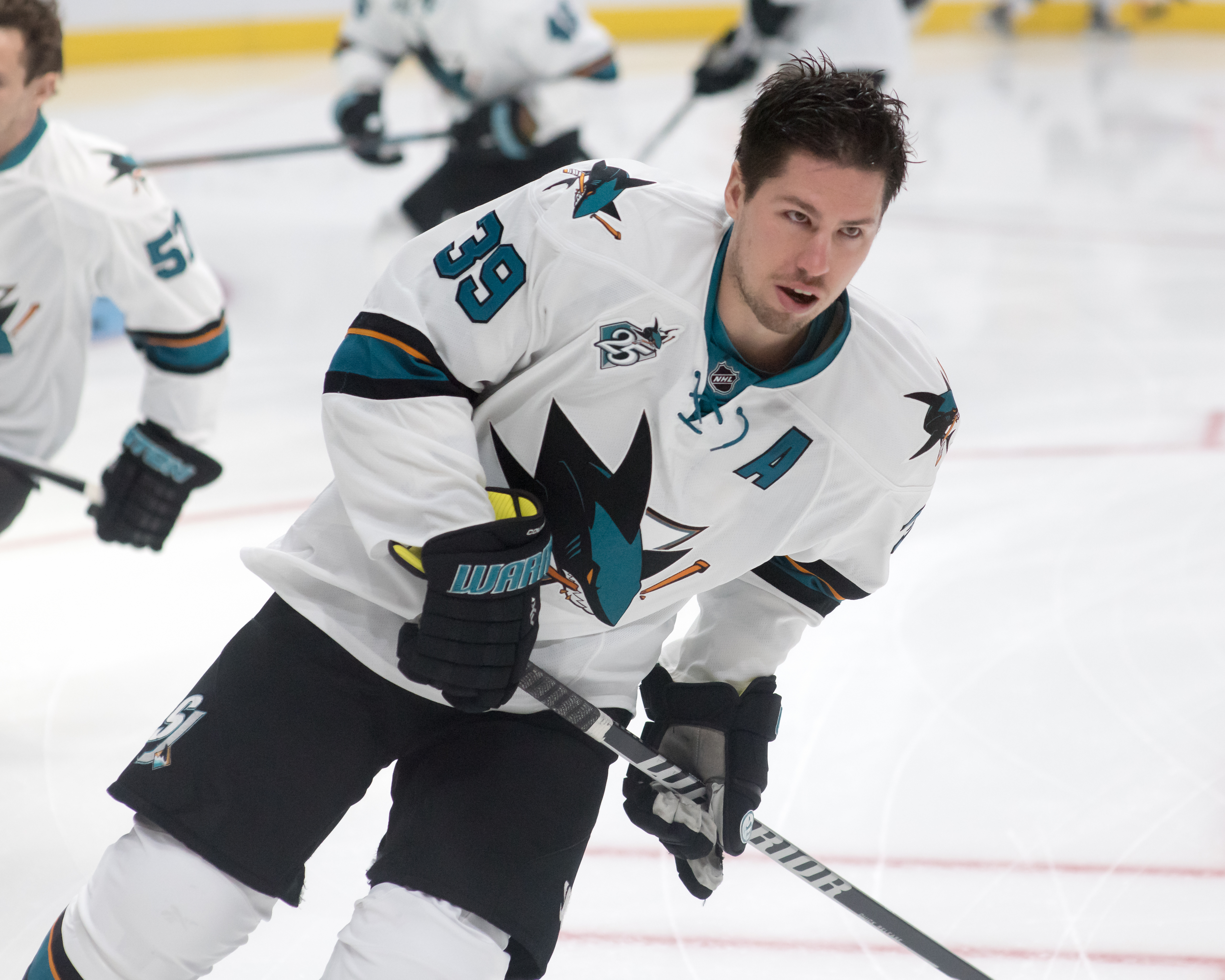
- Couture with the San Jose Sharks in April 2016
- Born: March 28, 1989 (age 37) Guelph, Ontario, Canada
- Height: 6 ft 1 in (185 cm)
- Weight: 206 lb (93 kg; 14 st 10 lb)
- Position: Centre
- Shot: Left
- NHL team Former teams: San Jose Sharks; Genève-Servette HC
- National team: Canada
- NHL draft: 9th overall, 2007; San Jose Sharks
- Playing career: 2009–2024

Logan Couture (born March 28, 1989) is a Canadian former professional ice hockey player. He played as a centre and spent his entire National Hockey League (NHL) career with the San Jose Sharks, who selected him ninth overall in the 2007 NHL entry draft.

Couture made his NHL debut in October 2009, was named an alternate captain of the Sharks ahead of the 2015–16 season, and went on to become captain ahead of the 2019–20 season. In April 2025, after not playing since January 2024 due to a lingering injury, Couture announced his retirement, effectively ending his playing career. He formally remains on the Sharks' roster on injured reserve until his contract expires at the end of the 2026–27 season.

Outside of the NHL, Couture briefly played internationally with Genève-Servette HC during the 2012–13 NHL lockout.

== Playing career ==
=== Minor ===
Although he was born in Guelph, Ontario, Couture spent most of his youth growing up in Birr, near London, Ontario. He started playing minor hockey with the Lucan Irish (DD) of the Ontario Minor Hockey Association (OMHA)'s Southwestern Ontario League.

Couture led his Lucan Irish Novice team to the OMHA's Red Lobster Cup for a SW Ontario title in 1998 and an OMHA All-Ontario DD title in 1998. His Irish Atom team also won the OMHA Ontario DD title in 2001. Both of those teams also won the International Silver Stick 'C' championships. He then moved to London and played three years with the 'AAA' London Junior Knights of the Minor Hockey Alliance League, where he was a teammate of current Los Angeles Kings defenceman Drew Doughty. After his Bantam year with the Jr. Knights, Couture signed with the Junior B St. Thomas Stars.

=== Junior ===
In May 2005, Couture was drafted by the Ontario Hockey League (OHL)'s Ottawa 67's 12th overall in the 2005 OHL Priority Draft. He went on to score at a near point-per-game pace as a rookie with 64 points in 65 games in 2005–06, third in league rookie scoring behind John Tavares and Sergei Kostitsyn. The next season, in 2006–07, Couture was added to the OHL roster for the 2006 ADT Canada-Russia Challenge, replacing Jordan Staal, who was retained by the NHL's Pittsburgh Penguins. Couture was also selected to play for the Eastern Conference in the 2007 OHL All-Star Game, winning the shooting accuracy competition. After completing his second OHL season, where he improved to 78 points in 54 games, Couture was drafted ninth overall by the San Jose Sharks in the 2007 NHL entry draft.

Returning to the 67's in 2007–08, Couture's production dipped to 58 points in 51 games, his lowest major junior total. He had also been named to the 2008 OHL All-Star Game, but was replaced by Michael Swift of the Niagara IceDogs due to injury. Next season, in 2008–09, he finished in ninth place in league scoring with 39 goals and 48 assists for 87 points in 62 games. He also appeared in the 2009 OHL All-Star Game. Near the end of the season, he was named OHL Player of the Week on March 16, 2009, following an eight-point performance in three games.

=== Professional ===
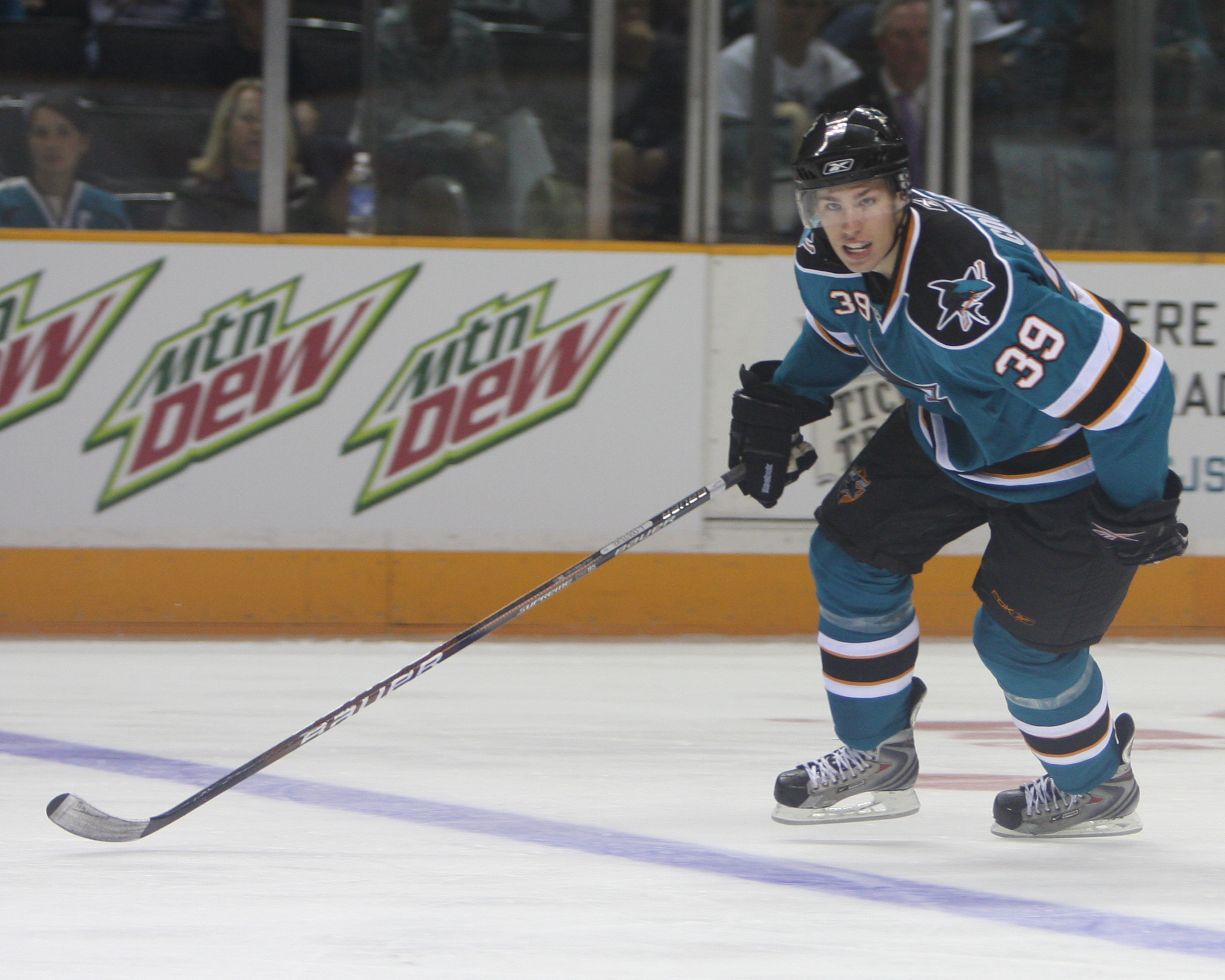
Couture with the Sharks during a preseason game, September 2009. He made his NHL debut with the team several weeks later.

On October 25, 2009, Couture made his NHL debut for the San Jose Sharks against the Philadelphia Flyers. He scored his first NHL goal on November 5, 2009, against Chris Osgood of the Detroit Red Wings. On April 22, 2010, Couture scored his first two playoff goals against the Colorado Avalanche in game five of the first round of the 2010 Stanley Cup playoffs. He scored the game-tying goal in game three in the second round against the Red Wings.

Couture was also an integral part of the success of the 2009–10 American Hockey League (AHL)'s Worcester Sharks, as he played 42 games and scored 20 goals and 33 assists for 53 points. He was a league-leader with nine game-winning goals and was named to the AHL All-Rookie Team. He was also voted onto the AHL All-Star starting line-up for AHL Team Canada, and finished the game with a goal and two assists as well as scoring a shoot-out goal.

Couture played his first full season with the Sharks in 2010–11 and finished with 32 goals (second among rookies) and 56 points (also second). He earned a nomination for the Calder Memorial Trophy for these achievements, along with the New York Islanders' Michael Grabner and the Carolina Hurricanes' Jeff Skinner, the latter of which who won the award.

On August 26, 2011, Couture signed a two-year, $5.75 million extension through to the 2013–14 season. During the 2012–13 NHL lockout, Couture played for Genève-Servette HC of the Swiss National League A. In the 2012–13 NHL season, when play resumed after the lockout, Couture played in all 48 regular season and 11 playoff games with the Sharks, leading the team in goals (21), blocks among forwards (51), game-winning goals (5), shots (151) and power play goals (7).

On July 5, 2013, the Sharks announced that the club had signed Couture to a five-year, $30 million contract extension, which would come into effect on July 1, 2014. On December 29, 2013, against the Anaheim Ducks, Couture scored his 100th career regular season goal. On January 6, 2014, the Sharks reported that Couture would have surgery to repair a wrist injury on January 8; he missed six weeks as a result.

After a seven-game loss in the first round of the 2014 playoffs to the eventual Stanley Cup champions Los Angeles Kings, Couture underwent surgery on his hand to repair an injury suffered in a fight with the Kings' Mike Richards in game six.

During the 2015–16 season, Couture suffered a broken fibula in a practice, and in the second game after he returned to play from that injury he suffered an arterial bleed which required remedial surgery. These injuries caused him to miss 30 games. However, he bolstered the San Jose Sharks line-up upon his return and helped lead the team all the way to the Stanley Cup finals, where they lost in six games to the Pittsburgh Penguins. Couture led all players in playoff assists (20) and scoring (30).

In August 2016, Couture was named to the Team Canada team for the 2016 World Cup of Hockey, replacing the Dallas Stars' Jamie Benn.

On July 1, 2018, he signed an eight-year, $64 million contract extension with the Sharks.

During the 2018–19 season, Couture amassed a personal-best 70-point season. The Sharks advanced as far as the 3rd round in the 2018–19 playoffs, losing to the eventual Stanley Cup champion St. Louis Blues in six games. Despite not playing in the championship final round, Couture still led all playoff players in goals with 14 and finished third overall in playoff scoring with 20 points.

Prior to the 2019–20 season, Couture was named the Sharks captain. It was his first captaincy since his junior career with the Ottawa 67's in 2008–09. He fractured his left ankle on January 9, 2020.

On October 27, 2022, he scored his 300th NHL goal, in a 4–3 overtime win against the Toronto Maple Leafs.

During the 2023–24 season, Couture began dealing with osteitis pubis, causing him to miss all but six games of the campaign.

In September 2024, the Sharks confirmed that Couture would remain captain for the 2024–25 season, despite being on long-term injured reserve.

On April 15, 2025, Couture announced his retirement from the NHL, citing his ongoing struggles with osteitis pubis, a groin and pelvic condition. He had not played in an NHL game since January 31, 2024. Couture later said that he had been in considerable pain even during those final games, and that the condition had since left him unable to skate or put together enough good days to return. Although he announced his retirement, he did not formally file retirement papers, and remains on the Sharks' roster as a player on injured reserve until his contract expires at the end of the 2026–27 season.

Couture has not been a part of the team's leadership group since his retirement, despite remaining on the roster. The Sharks elected not to name a replacement captain for the 2025–26 season, instead using a rotation of alternate captains from among their active players for home and away games. In September 2026, the Sharks named Macklin Celebrini the team's captain ahead of the 2026–27 season, succeeding Couture in the position.

== Personal life ==
Couture was born in Guelph, Ontario to firefighter Chet and physical education teacher Lori Couture. At birth, one of the delivery-room nurses was Bernadette Devorski, mother of NHL referee Paul and NHL linesman Greg Devorski.

Couture has a younger brother by two years, Judson. He grew up in a small town called Birr, just north of London, Ontario. He attended Prince Andrew Public School and Northridge Public School for grades seven and eight. In 2003, Couture graduated from Northridge. Couture then attended A.B. Lucas Secondary School and Hillcrest High School (Ottawa).

His father played OHA senior ice hockey for 13 years and was a veteran Ontario Lacrosse League (OLA) and National Lacrosse League (NLL) referee, while his mother, Lori, a graduate of Brock University, was a physical education teacher at Lucas Secondary School. Couture's grandfather on his mother's side, the late Cy Lemon, is a Canadian Lacrosse Hall of Fame inductee. His uncle Brian Lemon is a former nine-year veteran Major Indoor Lacrosse League (MILL) professional lacrosse and OLA lacrosse player, and is the current NLL vice-president of operations. On his father's side, his late grandfather, Bob Couture, was a softball pitcher and guitar player.

Growing up, Couture played ice hockey, lacrosse and baseball, where he was a two-time Honda Canada/Toronto Blue Jays "hit-run-throw" contest Canadian national champion in his age group. Couture decided at age 13 to drop the pursuit of baseball for ice hockey. He is also a fan of the National Football League's Buffalo Bills.

In 2020, Couture claimed he was sucker punched in Toronto for saying in public that he would vote for U.S. President Donald Trump in the election if he could.

== Career statistics ==
=== Regular season and playoffs ===
Bold indicates led league

			Regular season					Playoffs
Season	Team	League	GP	G	A	Pts	PIM	GP	G	A	Pts	PIM
2004–05	London Jr. Knights AAA	AH U15	56	51	56	107	42	—	—	—	—	—
2004–05	St. Thomas Stars	WOHL	48	24	22	46	6	11	4	6	10	2
2005–06	Ottawa 67's	OHL	65	25	39	64	52	6	3	4	7	0
2006–07	Ottawa 67's	OHL	54	26	52	78	24	5	1	7	8	4
2007–08	Ottawa 67's	OHL	51	21	37	58	37	4	2	1	3	0
2008–09	Ottawa 67's	OHL	62	39	48	87	46	7	3	7	10	6
2008–09	Worcester Sharks	AHL	4	0	0	0	7	12	2	1	3	11
2009–10	Worcester Sharks	AHL	42	20	33	53	12	—	—	—	—	—
2009–10	San Jose Sharks	NHL	25	5	4	9	6	15	4	0	4	4
2010–11	San Jose Sharks	NHL	79	32	24	56	41	18	7	7	14	2
2011–12	San Jose Sharks	NHL	80	31	34	65	16	5	1	3	4	0
2012–13	Genève-Servette HC	NLA	22	7	16	23	10	—	—	—	—	—
2012–13	San Jose Sharks	NHL	48	21	16	37	4	11	5	6	11	0
2013–14	San Jose Sharks	NHL	65	23	31	54	20	7	1	2	3	7
2014–15	San Jose Sharks	NHL	82	27	40	67	12	—	—	—	—	—
2015–16	San Jose Sharks	NHL	52	15	21	36	20	24	10	**20**	**30**	8
2016–17	San Jose Sharks	NHL	73	25	27	52	12	6	2	1	3	0
2017–18	San Jose Sharks	NHL	78	34	27	61	18	10	4	8	12	4
2018–19	San Jose Sharks	NHL	81	27	43	70	22	20	**14**	6	20	6
2019–20	San Jose Sharks	NHL	52	16	23	39	18	—	—	—	—	—
2020–21	San Jose Sharks	NHL	53	17	14	31	25	—	—	—	—	—
2021–22	San Jose Sharks	NHL	77	23	33	56	18	—	—	—	—	—
2022–23	San Jose Sharks	NHL	82	27	40	67	19	—	—	—	—	—
2023–24	San Jose Sharks	NHL	6	0	1	1	4	—	—	—	—	—
NHL totals			933	323	378	701	255	116	48	53	101	31

=== International ===
Medal record

Men's ice hockey

Representing Canada

Canada Cup / World Cup
Gold medal – first place	2016 Toronto	

Year	Team	Event	Result	GP	G	A	Pts	PIM
2006	Canada Ontario	U17	5th	5	5	5	10	2
2007	Canada	U18	4th	6	2	2	4	2
2016	Canada	WCH	1st place, gold medalist(s)	6	1	3	4	0
Junior totals				11	7	7	14	4
Senior totals				6	1	3	4	0

== Records and accomplishments ==
- All-time NHL leader in rookie-season road game-winning goals scored – 7
- San Jose Sharks franchise leader in rookie-season goals scored – 32
- First San Jose Shark to record 30 goals in his first two NHL seasons
- Led NHL in points during the 2016 Stanley Cup playoffs – 30

== Awards ==
- Named to the OHL All-Star Game in 2007, 2008* and 2009.
- Named OHL Player of the Week on March 16, 2009.
- Named NHL Rookie of the Month – December 2010
- NHL Rookie All-Star team captain – 2010–11
- Named to NHL All-Star Game – 2012 and 2020*
- NHL 2K SuperCard cover athlete – 2017

*unable to play due to injury

Awards and achievements
Preceded by Ty Wishart	San Jose Sharks first-round draft pick 2007	Succeeded by Nick Petrecki
Sporting positions
Preceded by Joe Pavelski	San Jose Sharks captain 2019–2025	Succeeded by Macklin Celebrini
