= List of San Jose Sharks players =

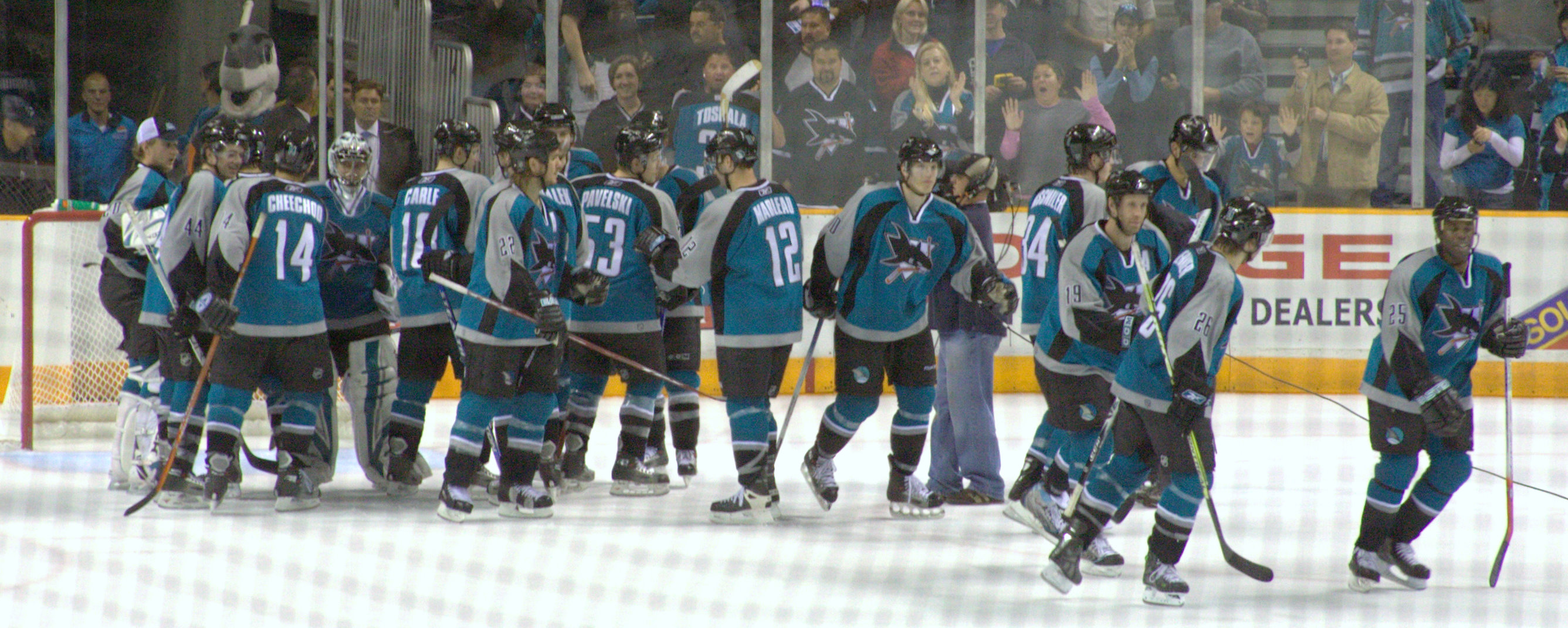
San Jose Sharks players celebrating a game win in 2006.

The San Jose Sharks are a professional ice hockey team based in San Jose, California, United States. They are members of the Pacific Division of the Western Conference in the National Hockey League (NHL). Founded in 1991 as an expansion team, the Sharks have won the Pacific Division six times: in 2002, 2004, 2008, 2009, 2010 and 2011, and have made the Stanley Cup playoffs in 18 of their 24 years in the League. San Jose has not won a Stanley Cup championship to date; the Sharks' longest run in the playoffs came in 2016, when they defeated the St. Louis Blues in the Western Conference Finals to reach the 2016 Stanley Cup Finals.

Since their inception, 283 different players have played at least one regular season or playoff game for the Sharks. The team has had nine captains. Doug Wilson was the first, serving in the team's expansion years between 1991 and 1993. Igor Larionov was another early player for the team, who along with Ed Belfour are the only Sharks to be inducted into the Hockey Hall of Fame. Goaltender Arturs Irbe, who was instrumental in leading the Sharks to their first playoff appearance in 1993–94 with 74 appearances in 84 games, and Jeff Friesen, who was named to the NHL All-Rookie Team for 1994–95, were among the team's early players.

The Sharks grew into a perennial Pacific Division contender in the 2000s following the drafting of several players, among them including forward Patrick Marleau, taken second overall in 1997, who holds the franchise records for the most goals (404) and points (861). Goaltender Evgeni Nabokov, selected in 1994, established himself as an NHL regular in 2000–01 when he won the Calder Memorial Trophy as the NHL's top rookie. He went on to win 293 games in San Jose. Jonathan Cheechoo is the only Sharks player to score 50 goals in a season; his total of 56 in 2005–06 earned him the Maurice "Rocket" Richard Trophy as the League's top goal scorer.

Joe Thornton, a Hall of Famer, was acquired in a trade with the Boston Bruins in 2005, Thornton won the Art Ross and Hart Memorial Trophies as the NHL's top scorer and most valuable player, respectively in his first season in San Jose. He has appeared in three NHL All-Star Games while a member of the Sharks, and won a gold medal competing for Canada at the 2010 Winter Olympics.

== Key ==
Appeared in an Sharks game during the 2025–26 NHL season or is still part of the organization.
retired jersey or elected to the Hockey Hall of Fame

Abbreviations
GP	Games played
HHOF	Hockey Hall of Fame inductee

Goaltenders
W	Wins	SO	Shutouts
L	Losses	GAA	Goals against average
T^{[a]}	Ties	SV%	Save percentage
OTL^{[a]}	Overtime loss		

Skaters
Pos	Position	RW	Right wing	A	Assists
D	Defenseman	C	Center	P	Points
LW	Left wing	G	Goals	PIM	Penalty minutes

The "Seasons" column lists the first year of the season of the player's first game and the last year of the season of the player's last game. For example, a player who played one game in the 2000–2001 season would be listed as playing with the team from 2000–2001, regardless of what calendar year the game occurred within.

Statistics complete as of the end of the 2025–26 season.

== Goaltenders ==
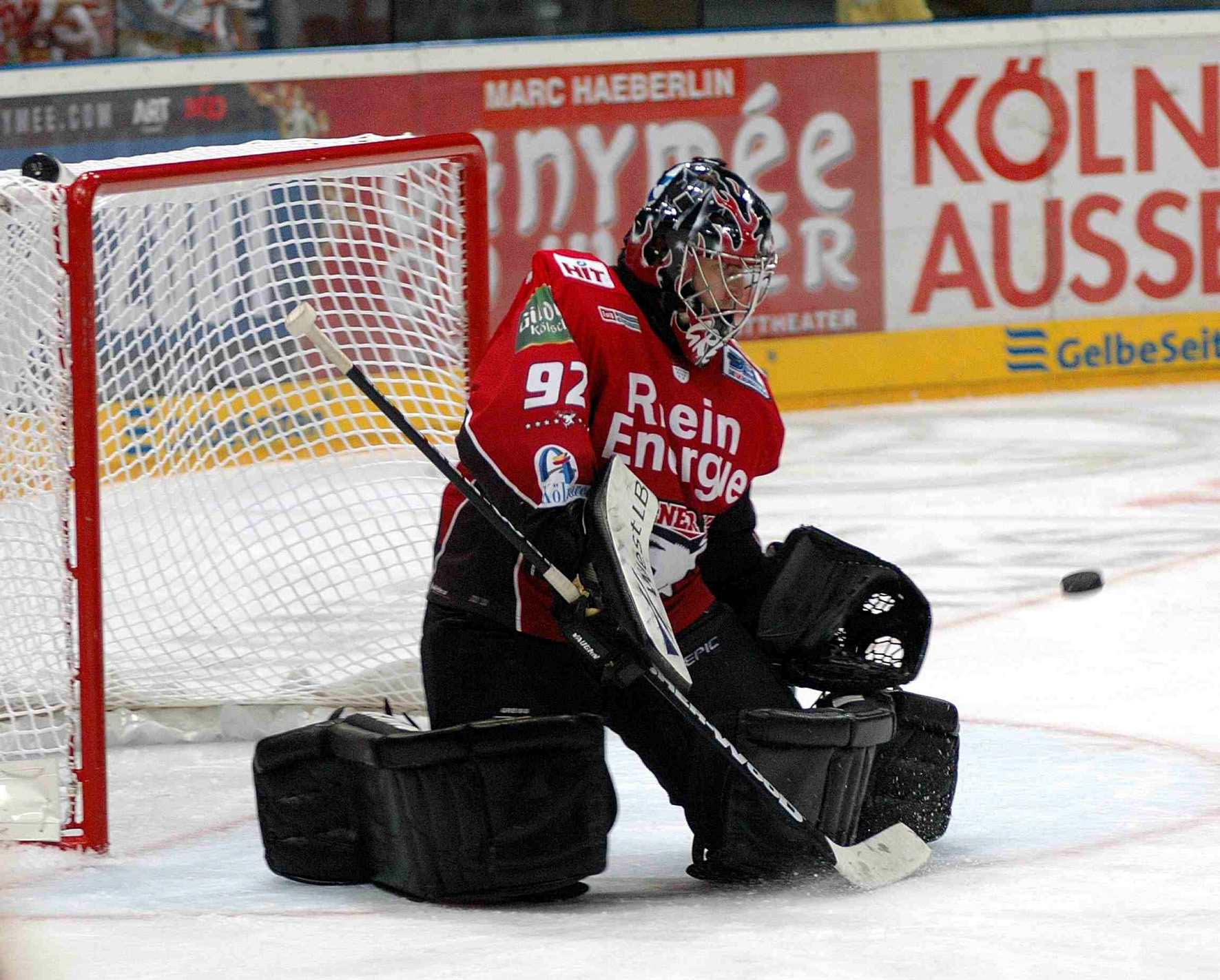
Shown with the Kolner Haie of the DEL, Thomas Greiss made his NHL and Sharks debut in 2008.

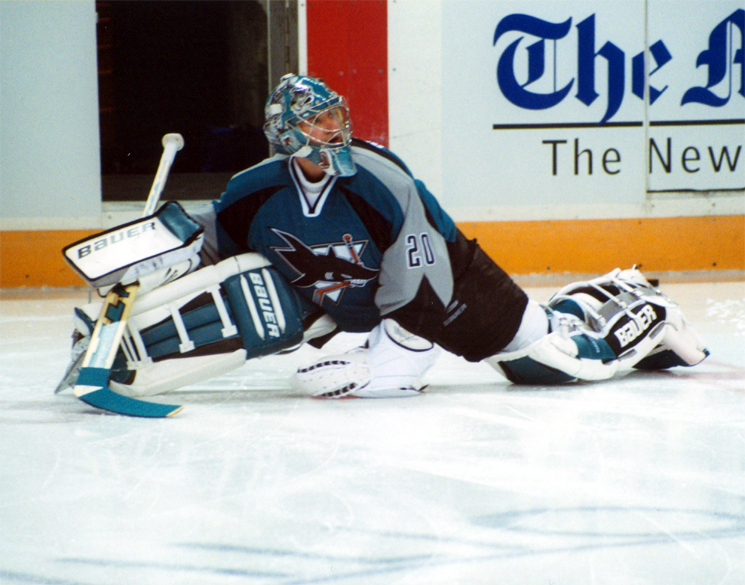
Evgeni Nabokov was drafted by the Sharks in 1994 and played his first game in 2000.

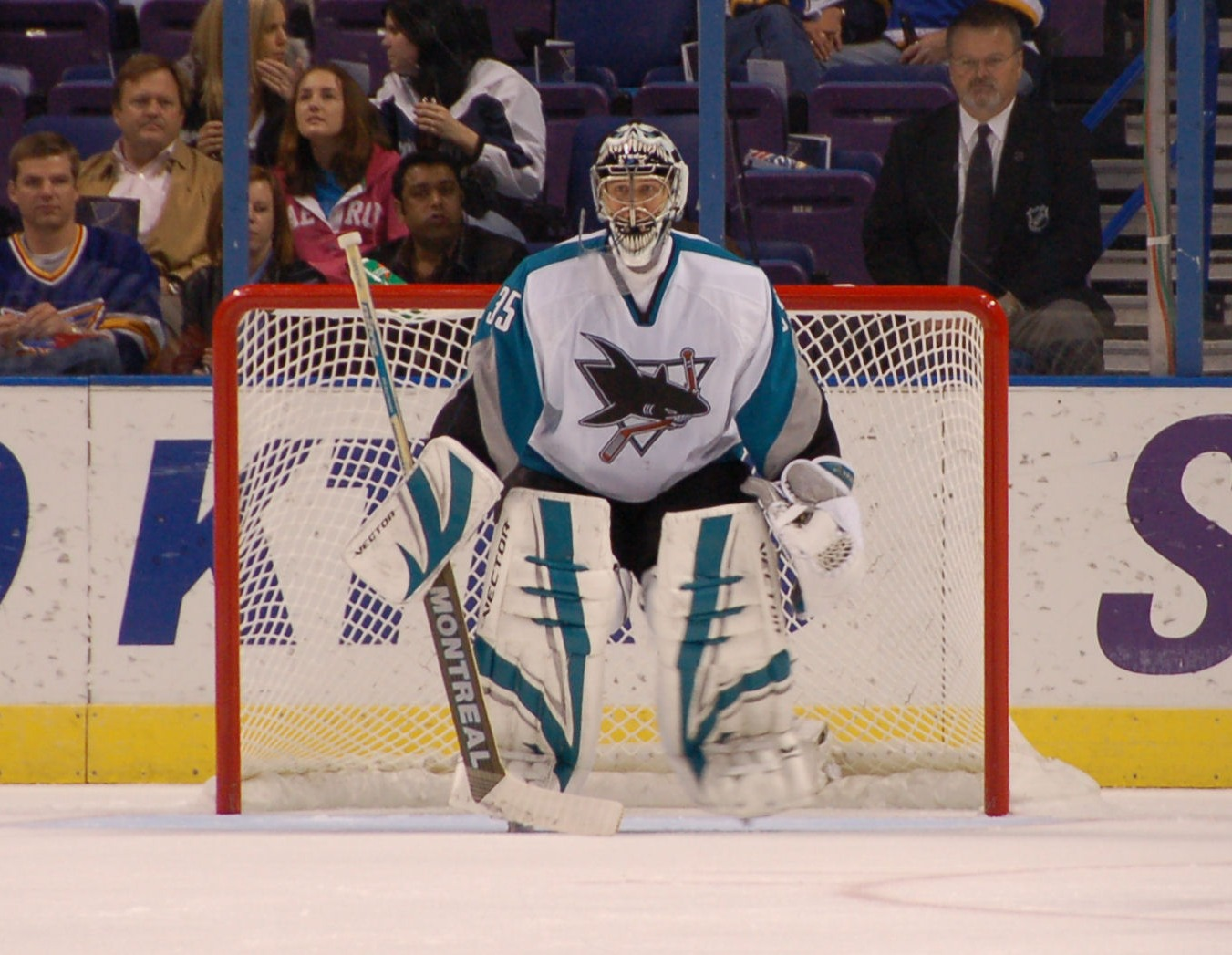
Over the course of five seasons, Vesa Toskala appeared in 115 games for the Sharks.

Name	Nat	Seasons	GP	W	L	T	OTL	SO	GAA	SV%	GP	W	L	SO	GAA	SV%	Notes
Name	Nat	Seasons	Regular-season								Playoffs						Notes
Yaroslav Askarov	(Russia)	2024–2026	60	25	26	—	6	0	3.51	.886	—	—	—	—	—	—	
Ed Belfour	(Canada)	1996–1997	13	3	9	0	—	1	3.41	.884	—	—	—	—	—	—	HHOF 2011
Mackenzie Blackwood	(Canada)	2023–2025	63	16	34	—	7	3	3.31	.902	—	—	—	—	—	—	
Brian Boucher	(United States)	2007–2009	27	15	7	—	4	3	2.12	.919	1	0	0	0	0.00	1.000	
Laurent Brossoit	(Canada)	2025–2026	1	0	1	—	0	0	6.09	.739	—	—	—	—	—	—	
Magnus Chrona	(Sweden)	2023–2024	9	1	6	—	1	0	4.71	.859	—	—	—	—	—	—	
Devin Cooley	(United States)	2023–2024	6	2	3	—	1	0	4.98	.870	—	—	—	—	—	—	
Aaron Dell	(Canada)	2016–2020; 2022–2023	111	48	37	—	12	5	2.75	.909	4	0	1	0	3.08	.891	
Devan Dubnyk	(Canada)	2020–2021	17	3	9	—	2	1	3.18	.898	—	—	—	—	—	—	
Wade Flaherty	(Canada)	1996–1997	53	10	26	2	—	1	4.29	.878	7	2	3	0	4.93	.860	
Sean Gauthier	(Canada)	1998–1999	1	0	0	0	—	0	0.00	1.000	—	—	—	—	—	—	
Alexandar Georgiev	(Russia)	2024–2025	31	7	19	—	4	0	3.88	.875	—	—	—	—	—	—	
Thomas Greiss	(Germany)	2007–2013	44	17	16	—	3	1	2.52	.912	1	0	0	0	3.00	.929	
Troy Grosenick	(United States)	2014–2015	2	1	1	—	0	1	1.58	.948	—	—	—	—	—	—	
Jeff Hackett	(Canada)	1991–1993	78	13	57	2	—	0	4.51	.875	—	—	—	—	—	—	
Brian Hayward	(Canada)	1991–1993	25	3	18	1	—	0	5.93	.849	—	—	—	—	—	—	
Adin Hill	(Canada)	2021–2022	25	10	11	—	1	2	2.66	.906	—	—	—	—	—	—	
Kelly Hrudey	(Canada)	1996–1998	76	20	40	7	—	1	3.04	.833	1	0	0	0	3.00	.833	
Arturs Irbe	(Latvia)	1991–1996	183	57	91	26	—	8	3.47	.882	20	9	11	0	4.12	.868	
Martin Jones	(Canada)	2015–2021	327	170	121	—	27	18	2.66	.907	60	32	27	6	2.41	.916	
Kaapo Kahkonen	(Finland)	2021–2024	79	17	46	—	11	1	3.71	.892	—	—	—	—	—	—	
Miikka Kiprusoff	(Finland)	2000–2004	47	14	21	3	—	3	2.84	.893	4	1	1	0	1.91	.938	
Josef Kořenář	(Czech Republic)	2020–2021	2	0	0	—	0	0	3.17	.899	—	—	—	—	—	—	
Eetu Mäkiniemi	(Finland)	2022–2023	2	1	0	—	1	0	2.13	.906	—	—	—	—	—	—	
Alexei Melnichuk	(Russia)	2020–2021	3	0	1	—	1	0	5.05	.864	—	—	—	—	—	—	
Jason Muzzatti	(Canada)	1997–1998	1	0	0	0	—	0	4.44	.867	—	—	—	—	—	—	
Jarmo Myllys	(Finland)	1991–1992	27	3	18	1	—	0	5.02	.867	—	—	—	—	—	—	
Evgeni Nabokov	(Russia)	1999–2010	563	293	178	29	51	50	2.39	.912	80	40	38	7	2.29	.913	
Alex Nedeljkovic	(United States)	2025–2026	40	18	14	—	4	0	2.87	.896	—	—	—	—	—	—	
Antti Niemi	(Finland)	2010–2015	296	153	92	—	35	25	2.39	.917	40	19	20	0	2.82	.906	
Antero Niittymaki	(Finland)	2010–2011	24	12	7	—	3	0	2.71	.896	2	1	0	0	0.66	.967	
Dimitri Patzold	(Germany)	2007–2008	3	0	0	—	0	0	5.45	.800	—	—	—	—	—	—	
Georgi Romanov	(Russia)	2023–2025	10	0	6	—	0	0	3.53	.888	—	—	—	—	—	—	
James Reimer	(Canada)	2015–2016; 2020–2023	99	37	40	—	18	7	3.05	.903	1	0	0	0	2.07	.857	
Geoff Sarjeant	(Canada)	1995–1996	4	0	2	1	—	0	4.92	.839	—	—	—	—	—	—	
Zachary Sawchenko	(Canada)	2021–2022	7	1	2	—	1	0	3.35	.901	—	—	—	—	—	—	
Nolan Schaefer	(Canada)	2005–2006	7	5	1	0	—	1	1.88	.920	—	—	—	—	—	—	
Steve Shields	(Canada)	1998–2001	125	48	49	21	—	10	2.44	.919	13	5	8	1	3.33	.883	
Alex Stalock	(United States)	2010–2015; 2021–2022	50	21	15	—	5	4	2.45	.908	3	0	1	0	2.05	.929	
Chris Terreri	(United States)	1995–1997	68	19	39	4	—	0	3.39	.888	—	—	—	—	—	—	
Vesa Toskala	(Finland)	2001–2007	115	65	28	5	5	8	2.35	.914	11	6	5	1	2.45	.910	
Vitek Vanecek	(Czech Republic)	2024–2025	18	3	10	—	3	0	3.88	.882	—	—	—	—	—	—	
Mike Vernon	(Canada)	1997–1999	111	46	44	18	—	9	2.30	.908	11	4	7	1	2.42	.913	HHOF 2023
Jimmy Waite	(Canada)	1993–1995	15	3	7	0	—	0	4.30	.843	2	0	0	0	4.50	.824	

== Skaters ==
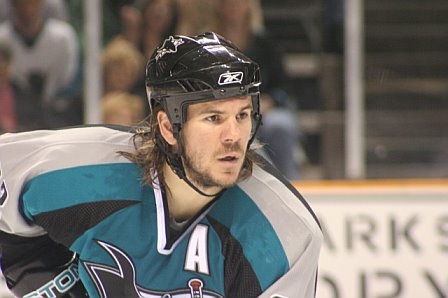
Scott Hannan was a Shark for eight seasons, from 1998 until 2007 before returning in 2012

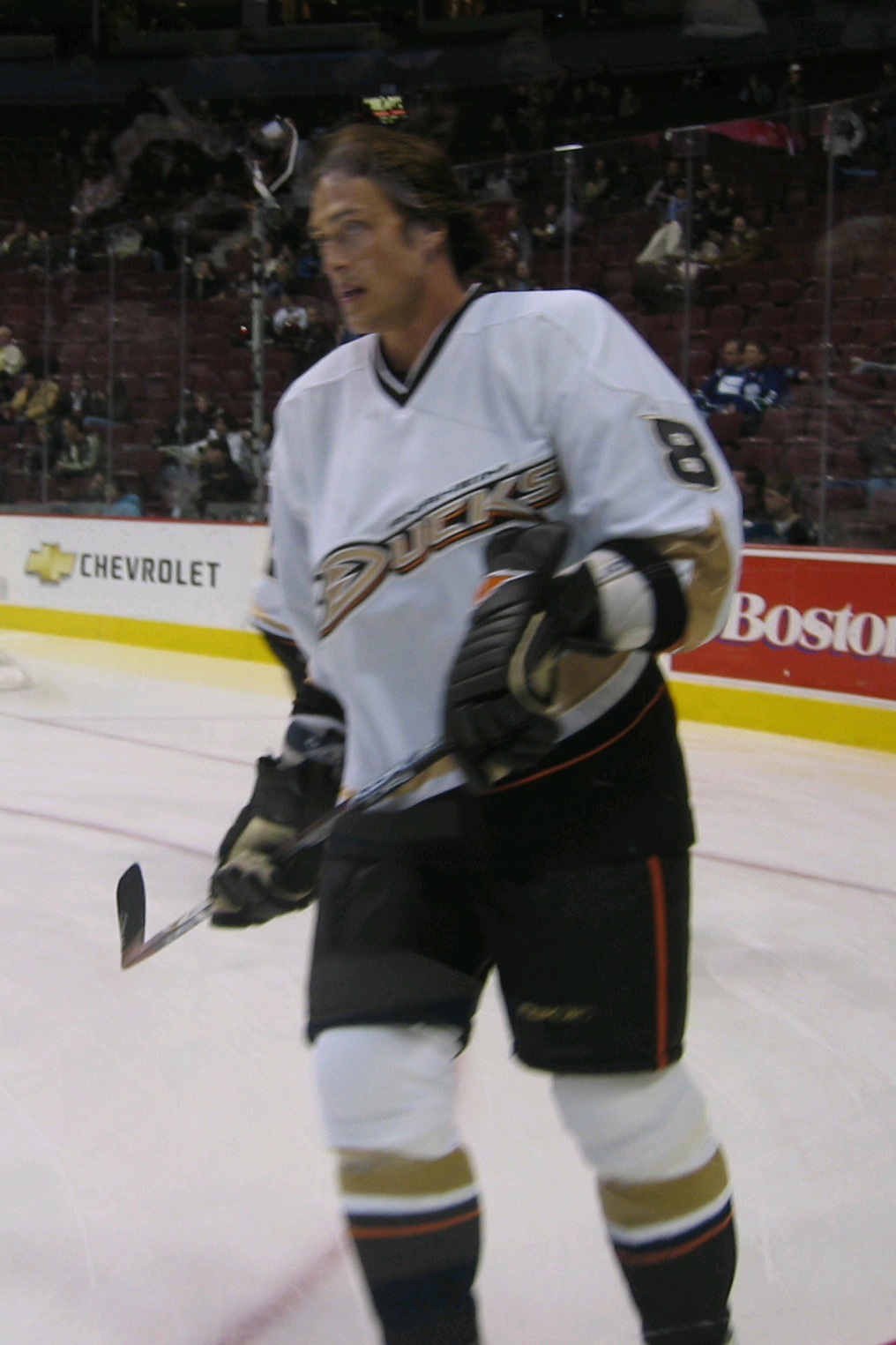
Seen here with the Anaheim Ducks, Teemu Selanne spent three seasons in San Jose

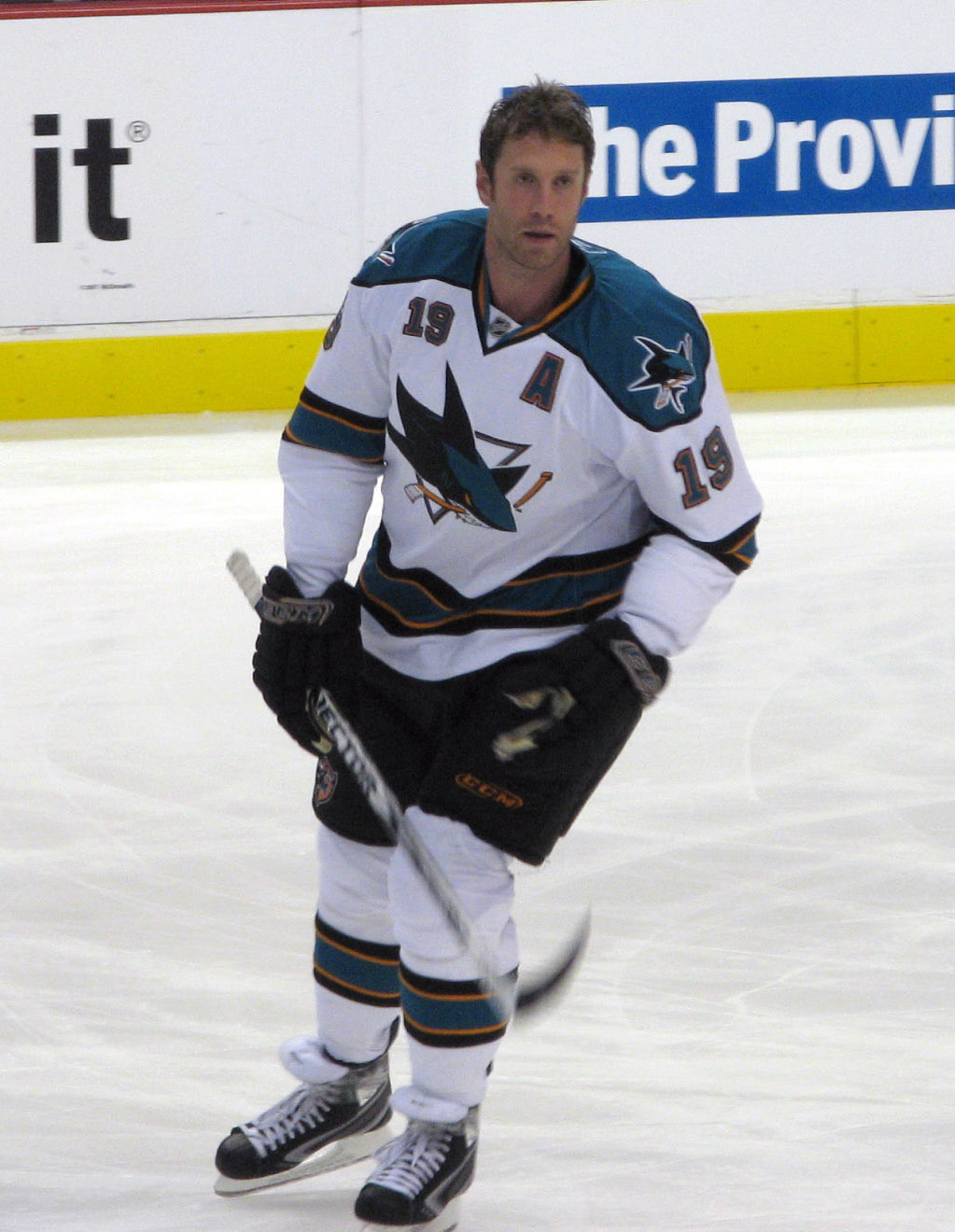
Traded to the Sharks in 2005, Joe Thornton won the Art Ross and Hart Memorial trophies in his first year with the team

Name	Nat	Pos	Seasons	GP	G	A	P	PIM	GP	G	A	P	PIM	Notes
Name	Nat	Pos	Seasons	Regular-season					Playoffs					Notes
Calen Addison	(Canada)	D	2023–2024	72	1	16	17	72	—	—	—	—	—	
Andrew Agozzino	(Canada)	LW	2022–2023	4	1	2	3	0	—	—	—	—	—	
Peter Ahola	(Finland)	D	1992–1993	20	2	3	5	16	—	—	—	—	—	
Perry Anderson	(Canada)	LW	1991–1992	48	4	8	12	143	—	—	—	—	—	
Niklas Andersson	(Sweden)	LW	1997–1998	5	0	0	0	2	—	—	—	—	—	
Riley Armstrong	(Canada)	RW	2008–2009	2	0	0	0	2	—	—	—	—	—	
Justin Bailey	(United States)	RW	2023–2024	59	5	9	14	6	—	—	—	—	—	
Jamie Baker	(Canada)	C	1993–1996; 1998–1999	186	35	27	62	139	25	5	4	9	42	
Rudolfs Balcers	(Latvia)	LW	2020–2022	102	19	21	40	36	—	—	—	—	—	
Steve Bancroft	(Canada)	D	2001–2002	5	0	1	1	2	—	—	—	—	—	
Alexander Barabanov	(Russia)	F	2020–2024	193	32	74	106	48	—	—	—	—	—	
Don Barber	(Canada)	LW	1991–1992	12	1	3	4	2	—	—	—	—	—	
Sergei Bautin	(Russia)	D	1995–1996	1	0	0	0	2	—	—	—	—	—	
Robin Bawa	(Canada)	C	1992–1993	42	5	0	5	47	—	—	—	—	—	
Mark Beaufait	(United States)	C	1992–1993	5	1	0	1	0	—	—	—	—	—	
Mark Bell	(Canada)	LW	2006–2007	71	11	10	21	83	4	0	0	0	2	
Matt Benning	(Canada)	D	2022–2025	98	1	25	26	44	—	—	—	—	—	
Perry Berezan	(Canada)	C	1991–1993	94	15	11	26	58	—	—	—	—	—	
Lean Bergmann	(Germany)	LW	2019–2021	13	0	1	1	8	—	—	—	—	—	
Steve Bernier	(Canada)	RW	2005–2008	160	42	39	81	126	22	1	6	7	10	
Rob Blake	(Canada)	D	2008–2010	143	17	58	75	170	21	2	4	6	14	HHOF 2014
Joachim Blichfeld	(Denmark)	LW	2019–2021	8	1	0	1	14	—	—	—	—	—	
Doug Bodger	(Canada)	D	1995–1998	166	9	40	49	146	—	—	—	—	—	
Mikkel Boedker	(Denmark)	LW	2016–2018	155	25	38	63	22	14	2	6	8	8	
Nick Bonino	(United States)	C	2021–2023	139	26	19	45	46	—	—	—	—	—	
Thomas Bordeleau	(United States)	C	2021–2025	44	6	12	18	18	—	—	—	—	—	
Brad Boyes	(Canada)	C	2003–2004	1	0	0	0	2	—	—	—	—	—	
Dan Boyle	(Canada)	D	2008–2014	431	68	201	269	305	62	11	37	48	38	
Steve Bozek	(Canada)	LW	1991–1992	58	8	8	16	27	—	—	—	—	—	
Matt Bradley	(Canada)	RW	2000–2003	121	12	17	29	99	10	0	0	0	0	
Justin Braun	(United States)	D	2010–2019	607	24	130	154	226	84	3	10	13	40	
Rich Brennan	(United States)	D	1997–1998	11	1	2	3	2	—	—	—	—	—	
Jonny Brodzinski	(United States)	C	2019–2020	3	0	1	1	0	—	—	—	—	—	
Curtis Brown	(Canada)	C	2003–2004; 2006–2008	123	15	18	33	72	35	0	4	4	24	
Dave Brown	(Canada)	RW	1995–1996	37	3	1	4	46	—	—	—	—	—	
Mike Brown	(United States)	RW	2013–2016	104	3	5	8	160	6	1	1	2	26	
David Bruce	(Canada)	RW	1991–1994	79	24	19	43	79	—	—	—	—	—	
Adam Burish	(United States)	RW	2012–2015	81	2	4	6	64	6	0	0	0	4	
Brent Burns	(Canada)	D	2011–2022	798	172	422	594	438	83	20	39	59	65	
Shawn Burr	(Canada)	LW	1997–1999	60	6	7	13	79	6	0	0	0	8	
Kyle Burroughs	(Canada)	D	2023–2024	73	2	6	8	71	—	—	—	—	—	
Vyacheslav Butsayev	(Russia)	C	1993–1995	18	2	2	4	10	10	1	0	0	0	
Ilya Byakin	(Russia)	D	1994–1995	13	0	5	5	14	—	—	—	—	—	
Lyndon Byers	(Canada)	RW	1992–1993	18	4	1	5	122	—	—	—	—	—	
Luca Cagnoni	(Canada)	D	2024–2026	9	0	2	2	10	—	—	—	—	—	
Joe Callahan	(United States)	D	2009–2010	1	0	1	1	0	—	—	—	—	—	
Jan Caloun	(Czech Republic)	RW	1995–1997	13	8	3	11	2	—	—	—	—	—	
Brian Campbell	(Canada)	D	2007–2008	20	3	16	19	8	13	1	6	7	4	
Dave Capuano	(United States)	LW	1993–1994	4	0	1	1	0	—	—	—	—	—	
Ethan Cardwell	(Canada)	RW	2024–2026	13	2	0	2	4	—	—	—	—	—	
Matt Carkner	(Canada)	D	2005–2006	1	0	1	1	2	—	—	—	—	—	
Matt Carle	(United States)	D	2005–2008	151	16	47	63	70	33	2	7	9	8	
Lucas Carlsson	(Sweden)	D	2024–2025	13	1	3	4	14	—	—	—	—	—	
Ryan Carpenter	(United States)	C	2015–2018; 2023–2024	90	7	10	17	12	—	—	—	—	—	
Trevor Carrick	(Canada)	D	2019–2020	3	0	0	0	5	—	—	—	—	—	
John Carter	(United States)	LW	1991–1993	59	7	9	16	81	—	—	—	—	—	
Tom Cavanagh	(United States)	C	2007–2009	18	1	2	3	4	—	—	—	—	—	
Cody Ceci	(Canada)	D	2024–2025	54	4	11	15	14	—	—	—	—	—	
Macklin Celebrini	(Canada)	F	2024–2026	152	70	108	178	72	—	—	—	—	—	
Rourke Chartier	(Canada)	C	2018–2019	13	1	0	1	2	—	—	—	—	—	
Jonathan Cheechoo	(Canada)	RW	2002–2009	440	165	126	291	304	58	16	19	35	32	
Ivan Chekhovich	(Russia)	LW	2020–2021	4	0	1	1	0	—	—	—	—	—	
Igor Chernyshov	(Russia)	LW	2025–2026	28	9	10	19	6	—	—	—	—	—	
Sasha Chmelevski	(United States)	C	2021–2022	24	0	10	10	6	—	—	—	—	—	
Nick Cicek	(Canada)	D	2022–2023	16	0	4	4	15	—	—	—	—	—	
Fredrik Claesson	(Sweden)	D	2020–2021	4	0	0	0	0	—	—	—	—	—	
Ryane Clowe	(Canada)	LW	2005–2013	423	101	170	271	567	68	18	27	45	97	
Andrew Cogliano	(Canada)	LW	2021–2022	56	4	11	15	12	—	—	—	—	—	
Mike Colman	(United States)	D	1991–1992	15	0	1	1	32	—	—	—	—	—	
Yvon Corriveau	(Canada)	LW	1992–1993	20	3	7	10	0	—	—	—	—	—	
Ed Courtenay	(Canada)	RW	1991–1993	44	7	13	20	10	—	—	—	—	—	
Logan Couture	(Canada)	C	2009–2024	933	323	378	701	255	116	48	53	101	31	
Craig Coxe	(United States)	LW	1991–1992	10	2	0	2	19	—	—	—	—	—	
Mike Craig	(Canada)	RW	1998–1999; 2001–2002	3	0	0	0	2	—	—	—	—	—	
Dale Craigwell	(Canada)	C	1991–1994	98	11	18	29	28	—	—	—	—	—	
Murray Craven	(Canada)	LW	1997–2000	129	16	29	45	47	6	1	1	2	0	
Kyle Criscuolo	(United States)	C	2022–2023	1	1	0	1	0	—	—	—	—	—	
Shawn Cronin	(United States)	D	1993–1995	63	0	4	4	137	23	1	0	1	25	
Jonathan Dahlén	(Sweden)	C	2021–2022	61	12	10	22	12	—	—	—	—	—	
Ulf Dahlen	(Sweden)	RW	1993–1997	161	41	52	93	46	25	11	6	17	0	
Vincent Damphousse	(Canada)	C	1998–2004	385	92	197	289	316	53	15	23	38	68	
Mathieu Darche	(Canada)	LW	2006–2007	2	0	0	0	0	—	—	—	—	—	
Brandon Davidson	(Canada)	D	2019–2020	5	0	0	0	0	—	—	—	—	—	
Rob Davison	(Canada)	D	2002–2008	176	2	12	14	238	6	0	2	2	4	
Ty Dellandrea	(Canada)	C	2024–2026	114	3	16	19	81	—	—	—	—	—	
Jason Demers	(Canada)	D	2009–2015	300	16	82	98	119	39	3	6	9	32	
Larry DePalma	(United States)	C	1992–1993	20	2	6	8	41	—	—	—	—	—	
Dylan DeMelo	(Canada)	D	2015–2018	133	3	29	32	62	10	0	1	1	4	
Vincent Desharnais	(Canada)	D	2024–2026	60	1	6	7	75	—	—	—	—	—	
Andrew Desjardins	(Canada)	D	2010–2015	272	15	33	48	248	26	2	2	4	43	
Sam Dickinson	(Canada)	D	2025–2026	72	1	13	14	22	—	—	—	—	—	
Niko Dimitrakos	(United States)	RW	2002–2006	134	19	34	53	83	15	1	8	9	8	
Brenden Dillon	(Canada)	D	2014–2020	439	13	75	88	379	60	0	9	9	71	
Bobby Dollas	(Canada)	D	2000–2001	16	1	2	4	14	—	—	—	—	—	
Ryan Donato	(United States)	C	2020–2021	50	6	14	20	10	—	—	—	—	—	
Shean Donovan	(Canada)	RW	1994–1998	181	25	17	42	109	7	0	1	1	6	
Joonas Donskoi	(Finland)	RW	2015–2019	283	45	77	122	66	50	9	12	21	8	
Gaetan Duchesne	(Canada)	LW	1993–1995	117	14	25	39	44	14	1	4	5	12	
Anthony Duclair	(Canada)	LW	2023–2024	56	16	11	27	28	—	—	—	—	—	
Walker Duehr	(United States)	F	2024–2025	8	2	0	2	0	—	—	—	—	—	
Ryan Dzingel	(United States)	C	2021–2022	6	1	0	1	0	—	—	—	—	—	
Ben Eager	(Canada)	LW	2010–2011	34	4	3	7	43	10	1	0	1	41	
Christian Ehrhoff	(Germany)	D	2003–2009	341	25	107	132	244	38	2	13	15	40	
William Eklund	(Sweden)	LW	2021–2026	252	50	113	163	99	—	—	—	—	—	
Nils Ekman	(Sweden)	RW	2003–2006	159	43	69	112	88	27	2	5	7	16	
Todd Elik	(Canada)	LW	1993–1995	97	32	51	83	107	14	5	5	10	12	
Ty Emberson	(United States)	D	2023–2024	30	1	9	10	6	—	—	—	—	—	
Gary Emmons	(Canada)	C	1993–1994	3	1	0	1	8	—	—	—	—	—	
Bob Errey	(Canada)	LW	1993–1995; 1996–1997	107	17	26	43	173	14	3	2	5	10	
Kevin Evans	(Canada)	LW	1991–1992	5	0	1	1	25	—	—	—	—	—	
Dean Evason	(Canada)	C	1991–1993	158	23	34	57	231	—	—	—	—	—	
Todd Ewen	(Canada)	RW	1996–1997	51	0	2	2	162	—	—	—	—	—	
Michael Eyssimont	(United States)	C	2022–2023	20	3	5	8	34	—	—	—	—	—	
Jim Fahey	(United States)	D	2002–2006	79	1	23	24	65	2	0	0	0	0	
Pat Falloon	(Canada)	RW	1991-1996	258	76	86	162	75	25	4	3	7	6	
Taylor Fedun	(Canada)	D	2014–2015	7	0	4	4	04	—	—	—	—	—	
Eric Fehr	(Canada)	RW	2017–2018	14	3	1	4	0	10	1	1	2	6	
Paul Fenton	(United States)	LW	1991–1992	60	11	4	15	33	—	—	—	—	—	
Mario Ferraro	(Canada)	D	2019–2026	490	24	90	114	216	—	—	—	—	—	
Benn Ferriero	(United States)	C	2009–2012	92	14	8	22	25	8	1	0	1	6	
Jesse Fibiger	(Canada)	D	2002–2003	16	0	0	0	2	—	—	—	—	—	
Iain Fraser	(Canada)	C	1996–1997	2	0	0	0	2	—	—	—	—	—	
Jeff Friesen	(Canada)	LW	1994–2001	512	149	201	350	316	34	5	10	15	30	
Kurtis Gabriel	(Canada)	RW	2020–2021	11	0	0	0	55	—	—	—	—	—	
Jonah Gadjovich	(Canada)	LW	2021–2023	78	4	6	10	131	—	—	—	—	—	
Link Gaetz	(Canada)	D	1991–1992	48	6	6	12	326	—	—	—	—	—	
TJ Galiardi	(United States)	LW	2011–2013	50	6	9	15	20	14	1	1	2	12	
Dylan Gambrell	(United States)	C	2017–2021	110	10	13	23	32	2	1	0	1	2	
Johan Garpenlov	(Sweden)	LW	1991–1995	184	46	86	132	90	14	4	6	10	6	
Adam Gaudette	(United States)	C	2025–2026	66	17	8	25	20	—	—	—	—	—	
Rob Gaudreau	(United States)	C	1992–1994	143	38	40	78	46	14	2	0	2	0	
Patrick Giles	(United States)	F	2024–2026	11	1	1	2	0	—	—	—	—	—	
Todd Gill	(Canada)	D	1996–1998	143	8	34	42	132	—	—	—	—	—	
Marcel Goc	(Germany)	C	2003–2009	265	20	34	54	76	37	3	5	8	8	
Nikolay Goldobin	(Russia)	LW	2015–2017	11	1	1	2	0	—	—	—	—	—	
Scott Gomez	(United States)	C	2012–2013	39	2	13	15	22	9	0	2	2	6	
Barclay Goodrow	(Canada)	RW	2014–2020; 2024–2026	427	36	55	91	383	22	2	0	2	22	
Josh Gorges	(Canada)	D	2005–2007	96	1	9	10	57	11	0	1	1	4	
Collin Graf	(United States)	F	2023–2026	121	26	33	59	20	—	—	—	—	—	
Tony Granato	(United States)	RW	1996–2001	278	57	42	99	387	23	2	2	4	20	
Mikael Granlund	(Finland)	C	2023–2025	121	27	78	105	52	—	—	—	—	—	
Adam Graves	(Canada)	LW	2001–2003	163	26	23	49	83	12	3	1	4	6	
Noah Gregor	(Canada)	C	2019–2023; 2024–2025	190	26	26	52	82	—	—	—	—	—	
Mike Grier	(United States)	RW	2006–2009	221	35	43	78	92	30	2	3	5	35	
Carl Grundstrom	(Sweden)	RW	2024–2025	56	3	6	9	24	—	—	—	—	—	
Bill Guerin	(United States)	RW	2006–2007	16	8	1	9	14	9	0	2	2	12	
Steve Guolla	(Canada)	C	1996–1999	64	16	11	27	20	—	—	—	—	—	
Daniil Gushchin	(Russia)	LW	2022–2025	18	2	3	5	6	—	—	—	—	—	
Jayden Halbgewachs	(Canada)	F	2021–2022	3	0	1	1	4	—	—	—	—	—	
Micheal Haley	(Canada)	C	2014–2017; 2018–2019	97	4	12	16	232	11	0	0	0	18	
Ken Hammond	(Canada)	D	1991–1992	46	5	10	15	82	—	—	—	—	—	
Fredrik Händemark	(Sweden)	C	2020–2021	8	1	0	1	2	—	—	—	—	—	
Michal Handzus	(Slovakia)	C	2011–2013	95	8	18	26	30	2	0	0	0	0	
Scott Hannan	(Canada)	D	1998–2007; 2012–2015	626	30	116	146	412	76	1	18	19	83	
Jannik Hansen	(Denmark)	RW	2016–2018	61	4	17	21	22	6	0	1	1	0	
Scott Harrington	(Canada)	D	2022–2023	28	1	6	7	8	—	—	—	—	—	
Todd Harvey	(Canada)	RW	1999–2004	301	34	49	83	335	46	2	4	6	30	
Santeri Hatakka	(Finland)	D	2021–2022	9	0	2	2	2	—	—	—	—	—	
Martin Havlat	(Czech Republic)	RW	2011–2014	127	27	40	67	62	8	2	1	3	8	
Eriah Hayes	(United States)	RW	2013–2015	19	1	0	1	4	—	—	—	—	—	
Greg Hawgood	(Canada)	D	1996–1997	63	6	12	18	69	—	—	—	—	—	
Dany Heatley	(Canada)	RW	2009–2011	162	65	81	146	110	32	5	17	22	28	
Tim Heed	(Sweden)	D	2016–2020	105	6	23	29	20	3	0	0	0	0	
Shawn Heins	(Canada)	D	1998–2003	81	3	7	10	105	2	0	0	0	0	
Dwight Helminen	(United States)	C	2009–2010	4	1	0	1	0	7	1	0	1	4	
Tomas Hertl	(Czech Republic)	C	2013–2024	712	218	266	484	256	62	24	18	42	20	
Alex Hicks	(Canada)	LW	1998–1999	4	0	1	1	4	—	—	—	—	—	
Mike Hoffman	(Canada)	C/LW	2023–2024	66	10	13	23	20	—	—	—	—	—	
Bill Houlder	(Canada)	D	1997–1999	158	16	48	64	88	12	4	2	6	6	
Tony Hrkac	(Canada)	C	1991–1992	22	2	10	12	4	—	—	—	—	—	
Tim Hunter	(Canada)	RW	1996–1997	46	0	4	4	135	—	—	—	—	—	
Kent Huskins	(Canada)	D	2009–2011	132	5	27	32	59	20	0	1	1	8	
Hannes Hyvonen	(Finland)	RW	2001–2002	6	0	0	0	0	—	—	—	—	—	
Al Iafrate	(United States)	D	1996–1998	59	8	16	24	119	6	1	0	1	10	
Mike Iggulden	(Canada)	C	2007–2008	1	0	0	0	0	—	—	—	—	—	
Vincent Iorio	(Canada)	D	2025–2026	21	0	3	3	12	—	—	—	—	—	
Matt Irwin	(Canada)	D	2012–2015	151	16	34	50	63	13	1	1	2	4	
John Jakopin	(Canada)	D	2002–2003	12	0	0	0	11	—	—	—	—	—	
Craig Janney	(United States)	C	1994–1996	98	18	64	82	36	11	3	4	7	4	
Christian Jaros	(Slovakia)	D	2020–2021	7	0	1	1	2	—	—	—	—	—	
Jeff Jillson	(United States)	D	2001–2003	74	5	19	24	38	4	0	0	0	0	
Andreas Johnsson	(Sweden)	LW	2022–2023	11	0	3	3	6	—	—	—	—	—	
Derek Joslin	(Canada)	D	2008–2011	53	1	6	7	26	—	—	—	—	—	
Evander Kane	(Canada)	LW	2017–2021	212	87	79	166	342	29	6	7	13	84	
Erik Karlsson	(Sweden)	D	2018–2023	293	52	191	243	106	19	2	14	16	8	
Melker Karlsson	(Sweden)	C	2014–2020	396	60	52	112	130	60	6	8	14	22	
Lukas Kaspar	(Czech Republic)	LW	2007–2009	16	2	2	4	8	—	—	—	—	—	
Martin Kaut	(Czech Republic)	RW	2022–2023	9	3	2	5	0	—	—	—	—	—	
Bracken Kearns	(Canada)	C	2012–2014	26	3	2	5	6	7	0	0	0	2	
Joel Kellman	(Sweden)	C	2019–2021	38	4	5	9	10	—	—	—	—	—	
Tim Kennedy	(United States)	LW	2012–2013	13	2	0	2	2	3	0	0	0	2	
Kelly Kisio	(Canada)	C	1991–1993	126	37	78	115	144	—	—	—	—	—	
John Klingberg	(Sweden)	D	2025–2026	56	10	17	27	24	—	—	—	—	—	
Artemi Kniazev	(Russia)	D	2021–2022	1	0	0	0	0	—	—	—	—	—	
Nikolai Knyzhov	(Russia)	D	2019–2024	81	3	9	12	55	—	—	—	—	—	
Dean Kolstad	(Canada)	D	1992–1993	10	0	2	2	12	—	—	—	—	—	
Alexander Korolyuk	(Russia)	LW	1997–2004	296	62	80	142	140	34	6	8	14	18	
Klim Kostin	(Russia)	C/LW	2023–2025	54	6	11	17	42	—	—	—	—	—	
Nikolai Kovalenko	(Russia)	RW	2024–2025	29	3	9	12	6	—	—	—	—	—	
Viktor Kozlov	(Russia)	C	1994–1998	174	29	40	69	50	—	—	—	—	—	
Ryan Kraft	(Canada)	C	2002–2003	7	0	1	1	0	—	—	—	—	—	
Mikhail Kravets	(Soviet Union) (Russia)	LW	1991–1993	2	0	0	0	0	—	—	—	—	—	
Vlastimil Kroupa	(Czech Republic)	D	1993–1997	103	4	18	22	66	20	1	2	3	25	
Paul Kruse	(Canada)	LW	2000–2001	1	0	0	0	5	—	—	—	—	—	
Luke Kunin	(United States)	C	2022–2025	171	27	22	49	171	—	—	—	—	—	
Philipp Kurashev	(Switzerland)	C	2025–2026	43	7	13	20	16	—	—	—	—	—	
Jim Kyte	(Canada)	D	1994–1996	75	3	12	15	179	11	0	2	2	14	
Kevin Labanc	(United States)	RW	2016–2024	478	82	143	225	217	30	5	9	14	16	
Mike Lalor	(Canada)	D	1993–1994	23	0	2	2	8	—	—	—	—	—	
Josh Langfeld	(United States)	RW	2005–2006	39	2	9	11	16	—	—	—	—	—	
Peter Lappin	(United States)	RW	1991–1992	1	0	0	0	0	—	—	—	—	—	
Igor Larionov	(Russia)	C	1993–1996	97	23	59	82	54	25	6	21	27	12	HHOF 2008
Brian Lawton	(Canada)	C	1991–1993	80	17	30	47	54	—	—	—	—	—	
Jay Leach	(United States)	D	2009–2010	28	1	1	2	20	—	—	—	—	—	
Nick Leddy	(United States)	D	2025–2026	32	1	6	7	6	—	—	—	—	—	
Claude Lemieux	(Canada)	RW	2008–2009	18	0	1	1	21	1	0	0	0	0	
John Leonard	(United States)	LW	2020–2022	58	4	11	15	2	—	—	—	—	—	
Bryan Lerg	(United States)	LW	2014–2016	8	1	0	1	0	—	—	—	—	—	
Rick Lessard	(Canada)	D	1991–1992	8	0	2	2	16	—	—	—	—	—	
Maxim Letunov	(Russia)	C	2019–2020	3	1	0	1	0	—	—	—	—	—	
Timothy Liljegren	(Sweden)	D	2024–2026	110	7	21	28	63	—	—	—	—	—	
Oskar Lindblom	(Sweden)	LW	2022–2024	74	6	9	15	18	—	—	—	—	—	
Bill Lindsay	(Canada)	LW	2000–2001	16	0	4	4	29	6	0	0	0	16	
Chris LiPuma	(United States)	D	1996–1997	8	0	0	0	22	—	—	—	—	—	
Steven Lorentz	(Canada)	C/LW	2022–2023	80	10	9	19	16	—	—	—	—	—	
Dave Lowry	(Canada)	LW	1997–2000	143	11	17	28	93	19	1	2	3	24	
Lynn Loyns	(Canada)	C	2002–2004	21	3	0	3	19	—	—	—	—	—	
Brad Lukowich	(Canada)	D	2008–2009	58	0	8	8	12	12	6	0	0	0	
Cameron Lund	(United States)	C	2024–2025	11	2	1	3	4	—	—	—	—	—	
Jacob MacDonald	(United States)	D	2022–2024	59	8	7	15	35	—	—	—	—	—	
John MacLean	(Canada)	RW	1997–1998	51	13	19	32	28	6	2	3	5	4	
Pat MacLeod	(Canada)	D	1991–1993	50	5	12	17	14	—	—	—	—	—	
Sergei Makarov	(Russia)	RW	1993–1995	123	40	52	92	118	25	11	5	16	8	HHOF 2016
David Maley	(United States)	LW	1992–1994	62	1	6	7	156	—	—	—	—	—	
Manny Malhotra	(Canada)	C	2009–2010	71	14	19	33	41	15	1	0	1	0	
Bryan Marchment	(Canada)	D	1997–2003	334	13	53	66	706	40	3	3	6	38	
Patrick Marleau	(Canada)	LW	1997–2017; 2019–2021	1,607	522	589	1,111	481	177	68	52	120	75	
Paul Martin	(United States)	D	2015–2018	173	7	41	48	44	37	1	5	6	12	
Jason Marshall	(Canada)	D	2003–2004	12	0	2	2	8	17	0	1	1	25	
Brandon Mashinter	(Canada)	C	2010–2011	13	0	0	0	17	—	—	—	—	—	
Stephane Matteau	(Canada)	LW	1997–2002	345	55	64	119	241	35	2	8	10	16	
Jamal Mayers	(Canada)	RW	2010–2011	78	3	11	14	124	12	0	0	0	12	
John McCarthy	(United States)	LW	2009–2016	88	3	3	6	22	—	—	—	—	—	
Alyn McCauley	(Canada)	C	2002–2006	174	35	83	118	62	17	2	2	4	6	
Hubie McDonough	(United States)	C	1992–1993	30	6	2	8	6	—	—	—	—	—	
Bob McGill	(Canada)	D	1991–1992	62	3	1	4	70	—	—	—	—	—	
Dan McGillis	(United States)	D	2002–2003	37	3	13	16	30	—	—	—	—	—	
Jamie McGinn	(Canada)	LW	2008–2012	204	27	22	49	99	22	0	1	1	38	
Mike McHugh	(United States)	LW	1991–1992	8	1	0	1	14	—	—	—	—	—	
Kyle McLaren	(Canada)	D	2002–2008	302	12	71	83	301	43	0	10	10	30	
Frazer McLaren	(Canada)	LW	2009–2013	40	1	5	6	85	—	—	—	—	—	
Jeff McLean	(Canada)	C	1993–1994	6	1	0	1	0	—	—	—	—	—	
Marty McSorley	(Canada)	D	1996–1998	113	6	22	28	326	—	—	—	—	—	
Jaycob Megna	(United States)	D	2021–2023	92	3	17	20	37	—	—	—	—	—	
Timo Meier	(Switzerland)	RW	2016–2023	451	154	162	316	259	35	7	13	20	46	
Nicolas Meloche	(Canada)	D	2020–2022	57	2	6	8	39	—	—	—	—	—	
Nick Merkley	(Canada)	RW	2021–2022	9	1	2	3	0	—	—	—	—	—	
Ryan Merkley	(Canada)	D	2021–2022	39	1	5	6	8	—	—	—	—	—	
Milan Michalek	(Czech Republic)	LW	2003–2009	317	91	123	214	184	39	10	6	16	18	
Jacob Middleton	(Canada)	D	2018–2021	59	3	9	12	82	—	—	—	—	—	
Kevin Miller	(United States)	C	1994–1996	89	28	27	55	54	6	0	0	0	2	
Kip Miller	(United States)	C	1993–1994	11	2	2	4	6	—	—	—	—	—	
Michael Misa	(Canada)	F	2025–2026	45	9	12	21	10	—	—	—	—	—	
Torrey Mitchell	(Canada)	C	2007–2012	280	30	43	73	152	55	2	9	11	30	
Travis Moen	(Canada)	LW	2008–2009	19	3	2	5	14	6	0	0	0	2	
Jim Montgomery	(Canada)	C	2000–2001	28	1	6	7	19	—	—	—	—	—	
Dominic Moore	(Canada)	C	2011–2012	23	0	6	6	22	3	0	0	0	5	
Mike Moore	(Canada)	D	2010–2011	6	1	0	1	7	—	—	—	—	—	
Jayson More	(Canada)	D	1991–1996	287	12	38	50	545	24	0	6	6	38	
Jon Morris	(United States)	C	1992–1993	13	0	3	3	6	—	—	—	—	—	
Brian Mullen	(United States)	RW	1991–1992	72	18	28	46	66	—	—	—	—	—	
Mirco Mueller	(Switzerland)	D	2014–2017	54	2	4	6	17	—	—	—	—	—	
Shakir Mukhamadullin	(Russia)	D	2023–2026	83	7	15	22	34	—	—	—	—	—	
Joe Murphy	(Canada)	RW	1997–1999	86	30	27	57	87	12	1	4	5	24	
Andrew Murray	(Canada)	C	2011–2012	39	1	3	4	4	—	—	—	—	—	
Douglas Murray	(Sweden)	D	2005–2013	451	6	53	59	361	57	2	8	10	46	
Brantt Myhres	(Canada)	RW	1998–2000	43	1	1	2	213	—	—	—	—	—	
Andrei Nazarov	(Russia)	LW	1993–1998	169	23	28	51	490	6	0	0	0	9	
Scott Nichol	(Canada)	C	2009–2011	135	8	18	26	122	30	1	1	2	43	
Bernie Nicholls	(Canada)	C	1996–1999	135	18	57	75	93	6	0	5	5	8	
Ville Nieminen	(Finland)	LW	2005–2007	52	4	5	9	24	11	0	2	2	24	
Matthew Nieto	(United States)	LW	2013–2017; 2020–2023	364	47	62	109	81	23	3	5	8	8	
Stefan Noesen	(United States)	RW	2019–2021	39	6	2	8	34	—	—	—	—	—	
Owen Nolan	(Canada)	RW	1995–2003	568	206	245	451	934	40	15	12	27	54	
Jeff Norton	(United States)	D	1993–1995; 1998–2001	225	12	81	93	174	38	1	14	15	39	
Gustav Nyquist	(Sweden)	RW	2018–2019	19	6	5	11	4	20	1	10	11	0	
Jeff Odgers	(Canada)	RW	1991–1996	334	48	34	82	1,001	22	1	1	2	34	
Nikita Okhotyuk	(Russia)	D	2023–2024	43	1	7	8	44	—	—	—	—	—	
Daniel O'Regan	(United States)	C	2016–2018	22	1	4	5	2	—	—	—	—	—	
Dmitry Orlov	(Russia)	D	2025–2026	82	3	34	37	48	—	—	—	—	—	
Jed Ortmeyer	(United States)	RW	2009–2010	76	8	11	19	37	4	0	1	1	0	
Zack Ostapchuk	(Canada)	C	2024–2026	72	4	3	7	64	—	—	—	—	—	
Jaroslav Otevrel	(Czech Republic)	C	1992–1994	16	3	4	7	2	—	—	—	—	—	
Sandis Ozolinsh	(Latvia)	D	1992–1995; 2007–2008	212	46	86	132	122	25	3	12	15	14	
Scott Parker	(United States)	RW	2003–2007	71	2	3	5	161	—	—	—	—	—	
Brinson Pasichnuk	(Canada)	D	2020–2021	4	0	0	0	2	—	—	—	—	—	
Greg Pateryn	(United States)	D	2020–2021	2	0	1	1	2	—	—	—	—	—	
Mark Pavelich	(United States)	C	1991–1992	2	0	1	1	4	—	—	—	—	—	
Joe Pavelski	(United States)	C	2006–2019	963	355	406	761	371	134	48	52	100	48	
Lane Pederson	(Canada)	F	2021–2022	29	0	2	2	10	—	—	—	—	—	
Mark Pederson	(Canada)	LW	1992–1993	27	7	3	10	22	—	—	—	—	—	
Tom Pederson	(United States)	D	1992–1996	225	19	47	66	133	24	1	11	12	10	
Matt Pelech	(Canada)	RW	2012–2014	8	1	0	1	29	—	—	—	—	—	
Ville Peltonen	(Finland)	LW	1995–1997	59	4	14	18	14	—	—	—	—	—	
Jacob Peterson	(Sweden)	C	2022–2024	17	2	6	8	6	—	—	—	—	—	
Nick Petrecki	(United States)	D	2012–2013	1	0	0	0	0	—	—	—	—	—	
Michel Picard	(Canada)	LW	1992–1993	25	4	0	4	24	—	—	—	—	—	
Tomas Plihal	(Czech Republic)	LW	2006–2009	89	7	9	16	26	4	0	0	0	0	
Barry Potomski	(Canada)	LW	1997–1998	9	0	1	1	30	—	—	—	—	—	
Andrew Poturalski	(United States)	C	2024–2025	3	0	1	1	2	—	—	—	—	—	
Derrick Pouliot	(Canada)	D	2022–2023	8	0	2	2	6	—	—	—	—	—	
Tom Preissing	(United States)	D	2003–2006	143	13	49	62	38	22	1	7	8	4	
Wayne Presley	(United States)	RW	1991–1992	47	8	14	22	76	—	—	—	—	—	
Wayne Primeau	(Canada)	C	2002–2006	100	15	24	39	107	17	1	2	3	4	
Dalton Prout	(Canada)	D	2019–2020	2	0	0	0	7	—	—	—	—	—	
J. F. Quintin	(Canada)	LW	1991–1993	22	5	5	10	4	—	—	—	—	—	
Yves Racine	(Canada)	D	1995–1996	32	1	16	17	28	—	—	—	—	—	
Lukas Radil	(Czech Republic)	C	2018–2020	50	7	4	11	14	6	0	0	0	0	
Marcus Ragnarsson	(Sweden)	D	1995–2003	519	28	125	153	392	41	1	8	9	40	
Adam Raska	(Czech Republic)	RW	2021–2023	8	0	0	0	7	—	—	—	—	—	
Mike Rathje	(Canada)	D	1993–2004	671	27	128	155	493	71	9	14	23	45	
Ryan Reaves	(Canada)	RW	2025–2026	50	3	0	3	37	—	—	—	—	—	
Scott Reedy	(United States)	C	2021–2022	35	7	2	9	10	—	—	—	—	—	
Pavol Regenda	(Slovakia)	F	2025–2026	24	9	1	10	20	—	—	—	—	—	
Mike Ricci	(Canada)	C	1997–2004	529	101	162	263	355	59	14	19	33	26	
Patrick Rissmiller	(United States)	C	2003–2008	180	18	27	45	60	30	3	4	7	10	
Craig Rivet	(Canada)	D	2006–2008	91	6	37	43	116	24	2	9	11	34	
Tristen Robins	(United Kingdom)	RW	2022–2023	3	0	0	0	0	—	—	—	—	—	
Jeremy Roenick	(United States)	C	2007–2009	111	18	28	46	50	18	2	4	6	14	HHOF 2024
Bob Rouse	(Canada)	D	1998–2000	96	0	12	12	63	6	0	0	0	6	
Jan Rutta	(Czech Republic)	D	2023–2025	123	8	20	28	66	—	—	—	—	—	
Joakim Ryan	(United States)	D	2017–2019	106	3	16	19	23	23	0	1	1	0	
Scott Sabourin	(Canada)	F	2023–2025	4	0	0	0	9	—	—	—	—	—	
Mikael Samuelsson	(Sweden)	RW	2000–2001	4	0	0	0	0	—	—	—	—	—	
John Scott	(Canada)	LW	2014–2015	38	3	1	4	87	—	—	—	—	—	
David Schlemko	(Canada)	D	2016–2017	62	2	16	18	14	6	2	1	3	2	
Jimmy Schuldt	(United States)	D	2024–2025	8	0	0	0	0	—	—	—	—	—	
Claudio Scremin	(Canada)	D	1991–1993	17	0	1	1	29	—	—	—	—	—	
Teemu Selanne	(Finland)	RW	2000–2003	176	64	67	131	70	18	5	5	10	4	HHOF 2017
Alexei Semenov	(Russia)	D	2007–2009	69	2	10	12	93	2	0	0	0	2	
Devin Setoguchi	(Canada)	RW	2007–2011	267	84	75	159	89	48	14	10	24	22	
Jody Shelley	(Canada)	LW	2007–2010	137	3	11	14	285	7	0	0	0	2	
James Sheppard	(Canada)	C	2012–2015	156	10	30	40	75	18	2	4	6	6	
Ray Sheppard	(Canada)	RW	1995–1996	51	27	19	46	10	—	—	—	—	—	
Kiefer Sherwood	(United States)	RW	2025–2026	72	23	13	36	50	—	—	—	—	—	
Radim Simek	(Czech Republic)	D	2018–2023	209	7	22	29	74	—	—	—	—	—	
Jarrod Skalde	(Canada)	C	1997–1999	39	5	7	12	18	—	—	—	—	—	
Jeff Skinner	(Canada)	C	2025–2026	32	6	7	13	14	—	—	—	—	—	
Petri Skriko	(Finland)	LW	1992–1993	17	4	3	7	6	—	—	—	—	—	
Ben Smith	(United States)	RW	2014–2016	25	2	3	5	0	—	—	—	—	—	
Givani Smith	(Canada)	RW	2023–2025	42	1	3	4	50	—	—	—	—	—	
Mark Smith	(Canada)	C	2000–2007	323	22	44	66	398	24	4	0	4	21	
Will Smith	(United States)	C	2024–2026	143	42	62	104	34	—	—	—	—	—	
Dave Snuggerud	(United States)	LW	1991–1993	36	4	6	10	18	—	—	—	—	—	
Marcus Sorensen	(Sweden)	RW	2016–2021	226	31	33	64	74	34	5	7	12	4	
Nick Spaling	(Canada)	C	2015–2016	23	2	4	6	6	24	0	1	1	6	
Brad Staubitz	(Canada)	RW	2008–2010	82	4	5	9	186	—	—	—	—	—	
Ronnie Stern	(Canada)	RW	1998–2000	145	11	14	25	309	9	1	0	1	17	
Grant Stevenson	(Canada)	C	2005–2006	47	10	12	22	14	5	0	0	0	4	
Karl Stollery	(Canada)	D	2014–2015	5	0	0	0	4	—	—	—	—	—	
Brad Stuart	(Canada)	D	1999–2006; 2012–2014	486	39	131	170	281	64	4	10	14	29	
Jack Studnicka	(Canada)	C	2023–2024	17	0	0	0	6	—	—	—	—	—	
Marco Sturm	(Germany)	LW	1997–2006	553	128	145	273	242	38	6	9	15	12	
Nico Sturm	(Germany)	C	2022–2025	184	26	26	52	48	—	—	—	—	—	
C. J. Suess	(United States)	LW	2022–2023	1	0	0	0	2a	—	—	—	—	—	
Mike Sullivan	(United States)	C	1991–1994	171	16	21	37	49	—	—	—	—	—	
Niklas Sundstrom	(Sweden)	RW	1999–2003	281	33	104	137	122	30	1	11	12	10	
Antti Suomela	(Finland)	C	2018–2021	51	4	11	15	8	—	—	—	—	—	
Gary Suter	(Canada)	D	1998–2002	227	22	79	101	193	25	2	9	11	20	
Ron Sutter	(Canada)	C	1996–2000	272	15	26	41	161	24	1	2	3	28	
Andy Sutton	(Canada)	D	1998–2000	71	1	4	5	145	—	—	—	—	—	
Ken Sutton	(Canada)	D	1997–1998	8	0	0	0	15	—	—	—	—	—	
Evgeny Svechnikov	(Russia)	LW	2022–2023	59	8	6	14	26	—	—	—	—	—	
Michal Sykora	(Czech Republic)	D	1993–1997	152	7	29	36	137	—	—	—	—	—	
Chris Tancill	(United States)	RW	1994–1997	96	14	27	41	38	11	1	1	2	8	
Daniil Tarasov	(Russia)	RW	2014–2015	5	0	1	1	0	—	—	—	—	—	
Matt Tennyson	(United States)	D	2012–2016	60	3	11	14	18	—	—	—	—	—	
Jack Thompson	(Canada)	D	2023–2025	33	4	6	10	10	—	—	—	—	—	
Joe Thornton	(Canada)	C	2005–2020	1,104	251	804	1,055	631	144	25	90	115	91	HHOF 2025
Scott Thornton	(Canada)	LW	2000–2006	342	77	70	147	439	41	10	5	15	42	
Henry Thrun	(United States)	D	2022–2025	119	5	20	25	46	—	—	—	—	—	
Chris Tierney	(Canada)	C	2014–2018	284	41	63	104	40	40	5	7	12	8	
Tyler Toffoli	(Canada)	C	2024–2026	157	49	54	103	24	—	—	—	—	—	
Raffi Torres	(Canada)	LW	2012–2015	16	5	6	11	11	12	3	1	4	20	
Alexander True	(Denmark)	C	2019–2021	19	0	5	5	8	—	—	—	—	—	
Darren Turcotte	(United States)	C	1995–1997	74	22	26	48	20	—	—	—	—	—	
Jim Vandermeer	(Canada)	D	2011–2012	25	1	3	4	33	—	—	—	—	—	
Ryan Vesce	(United States)	RW	2008–2009	19	3	2	5	4	—	—	—	—	—	
Jeffrey Viel	(Canada)	F	2020–2023	49	3	2	5	139	—	—	—	—	—	
Marc-Edouard Vlasic	(Canada)	D	2006–2025	1,323	84	295	378	472	142	6	33	39	42	
Jake Walman	(Canada)	D	2024–2025	50	6	26	32	36	—	—	—	—	—	
Niclas Wallin	(Sweden)	D	2009–2011	97	3	7	10	69	24	1	3	4	12	
Joel Ward	(Canada)	RW	2015–2018	209	36	48	84	78	30	8	9	17	20	
Jasper Weatherby	(United States)	C	2021–2022	50	5	6	11	18	—	—	—	—	—	
Kyle Wellwood	(Canada)	C	2010–2011	35	5	8	13	0	18	1	6	7	0	
Alexander Wennberg	(Sweden)	C	2024–2026	157	28	62	90	32	—	—	—	—	—	
Colin White	(Canada)	D	2011–2012	54	1	3	4	21	3	1	0	1	0	
Colin White	(United States)	C	2024–2025	3	0	0	0	0	—	—	—	—	—	
Ian White	(Canada)	D	2010–2011	23	2	8	10	8	17	1	8	9	8	
Ray Whitney	(Canada)	LW	1991–1997	200	48	73	121	52	25	4	8	12	10	
Jason Widmer	(Canada)	D	1996–1997	2	0	1	1	0	—	—	—	—	—	
Neil Wilkinson	(Canada)	D	1991–1993	119	5	22	27	203	—	—	—	—	—	
David Williams	(United States)	D	1991–1993	96	4	36	40	89	—	—	—	—	—	
Doug Wilson	(Canada)	D	1991–1993	86	12	36	48	66	—	—	—	—	—	HHOF 2020
Brad Winchester	(United States)	LW	2011–2012	67	6	4	10	88	1	0	0	0	0	
Tommy Wingels	(United States)	C	2010–2017	337	51	71	122	197	45	2	6	8	38	
Daniel Winnik	(Canada)	LW	2011–2012	21	3	2	5	10	5	0	1	1	6	
Chad Wiseman	(Canada)	LW	2002–2003	4	0	0	0	4	—	—	—	—	—	
Dody Wood	(Canada)	C	1992–1998	106	8	10	18	471	—	—	—	—	—	
Alexei Yegorov	(Russia)	RW	1995–1997	11	3	3	6	2	—	—	—	—	—	
Danil Yurtaikin	(Russia)	D	2019–2020	4	0	0	0	0	—	—	—	—	—	
Filip Zadina	(Czech Republic)	RW	2023–2024	72	13	10	23	18	—	—	—	—	—	
Miroslav Zalesak	(Slovakia)	RW	2002–2004	12	1	2	3	0	—	—	—	—	—	
Steven Zalewski	(United States)	C	2009–2010	3	0	0	0	0	—	—	—	—	—	
Fabian Zetterlund	(Sweden)	W	2022–2025	168	41	42	83	51	—	—	—	—	—	
Rob Zettler	(Canada)	D	1991–1994	196	1	18	19	314	—	—	—	—	—	
Doug Zmolek	(United States)	D	1992–1994	152	5	14	19	351	—	—	—	—	—	
Dainius Zubrus	(Lithuania)	LW	2015–2016	50	3	4	7	20	14	1	1	2	6	
Andrei Zyuzin	(Russia)	D	1997–1999	81	9	8	17	104	6	1	0	1	14	

== Notes ==
- ^{a} As of the 2005–2006 NHL season, all games have a winner; teams losing in overtime and shootouts are awarded one point thus the OTL stat replaces the tie statistic. The OTL column also includes SOL (Shootout losses).
