= Perry Anderson (ice hockey) =

Canadian ice hockey forward (born 1961)

- Born: October 14, 1961 (age 65) Barrie, Ontario, Canada
- Height: 6 ft 1 in (185 cm)
- Weight: 225 lb (102 kg; 16 st 1 lb)
- Position: Left wing
- Shot: Left
- Played for: St. Louis Blues; New Jersey Devils; San Jose Sharks
- NHL draft: 117th overall, 1980; St. Louis Blues
- Playing career: 1981–1994

Perry Lynn "Wheels" Anderson (born October 14, 1961) is a Canadian retired professional ice hockey forward who played for the St. Louis Blues, New Jersey Devils and San Jose Sharks of the NHL. Anderson was drafted by the St. Louis Blues with the 117th overall pick in the 1980 NHL entry draft.

== Career ==
=== Junior hockey ===
Born in Barrie, Ontario, Anderson played with the Alliston Hornets of the OHA-C in the 1977–78 season, earning 60 points in 45 games, as he was drafted by the Kingston Canadians of the OMJHL.

He joined the Canadians as a 17-year-old in the 1978-79 season, where as a rookie, Anderson had 19 points in 61 games, followed by three points in five playoff games. Anderson improved his numbers in the 1979–80 season, as he scored 17 goals and 33 points in 63 games with Kingston. He was held pointless in three playoff games.

Anderson began the 1980–81 season with Kingston, earning 22 points in 38 games, along with 118 PIM, before being traded to the Brantford Alexanders. In 31 games with Brantford, Anderson had 35 points. In the playoffs, Anderson had four goals and six points in six games.

=== Professional career ===
==== St. Louis Blues ====
Anderson was drafted by the St. Louis Blues in the sixth round, 117th overall, in the 1980 NHL entry draft. The Blues had Anderson begin the 1981–82 season with the Salt Lake Golden Eagles of the CHL, where he recorded 32 goals and 64 points in 72 games, as well as 117 PIM. Anderson appeared in two playoff games with the Golden Eagles, scoring a goal. Anderson also had his first taste of the NHL in 1981–82, as he appeared in five games with the Blues, scoring a goal and two assists. Anderson then suited up for ten playoff games with St. Louis, scoring two goals.

Anderson spent the majority of the 1982–83 season with Salt Lake, earning 42 points in 57 games, along with 140 PIM, however, he was once again called up to St. Louis, where in 18 games, Anderson had five goals and seven points.

In the 1983–84 season, Anderson played in eight games with the Montana Magic of the CHL, where he had 10 points in eight games. He spent most of the season with St. Louis, where Anderson played in 50 games, earning 12 points, while accumulating 195 PIM. He was held pointless in nine playoff games, as he had 27 PIM.

Anderson spent the entire 1984–85 season with the Blues, earning 18 points in a career high 71 games. He appeared in three playoff games, as he was held pointless.

On August 29, 1985, the Blues traded Anderson to the New Jersey Devils for Rick Meagher and the Devils twelfth round draft pick in the 1986 NHL entry draft.

==== New Jersey Devils ====
Anderson would score a career high 19 points with the Devils in the 1985–86 season in 51 games, as he had seven goals and twelve assists, however, the Devils did not advance to the playoffs.

He would match his career high 19 points in 1986–87, as he had a career best ten goals for New Jersey in 57 games. The Devils would once again fail to make the playoffs. Anderson also had a stint with the Maine Mariners of the AHL, earning nine points in nine games.

In 1987–88, Anderson saw his production drop, as he had only ten points in 60 games, his lowest point total since the 1982-83 season. Anderson also saw his penalty minutes jump, as he had a career high 222. In the playoffs, Anderson had no points in ten games, while recording a Devils playoff record 113 penalty minutes.

He ran into some injury problems in the 1988–89 season, as Anderson dressed for only 39 games with New Jersey, earning nine points, as well as 128 PIM.

Anderson spent the entire 1989–90 season with the Utica Devils of the AHL, where he scored 13 goals and 30 points in 71 games. Most of the 1990-91 season was spent in Utica once again, as Anderson had 19 goals and 33 points in 68 games, as well as 245 PIM. Anderson did spend a part of the season in New Jersey, where he appeared in only one regular season game, going pointless, before earning an assist in four playoff games with the Devils.

On July 8, 1991, Anderson left the Devils as a free agent, as he signed with the San Jose Sharks.

==== San Jose Sharks ====
Anderson once again had a regular spot in the NHL, as he appeared in 48 games with the expansion team San Jose Sharks, earning 12 points while posting 143 PIM. It would be Anderson's only season in San Jose.

==== Minor leagues ====
Anderson signed with the San Diego Gulls of the IHL for the 1992–93 season, where he had 21 points in 51 games before going pointless in five playoff games.

Anderson finished his career with the Salt Lake Golden Eagles of the IHL in 1993–94, where he appeared in only two games, going pointless, while having 21 PIM. He retired from hockey following the season.

== Career statistics ==
=== Regular season and playoffs ===
			Regular season					Playoffs
Season	Team	League	GP	G	A	Pts	PIM	GP	G	A	Pts	PIM
1978–79	Kingston Canadians	OMJHL	61	6	13	19	85	5	2	1	3	6
1979–80	Kingston Canadians	OMJHL	63	17	16	33	52	3	0	0	0	6
1980–81	Kingston Canadians	OHL	38	9	13	22	118	—	—	—	—	—
1980–81	Brantford Alexanders	OHL	31	8	27	35	43	6	4	2	6	15
1981–82	Salt Lake Golden Eagles	CHL	71	32	32	64	117	2	1	0	1	2
1981–82	St. Louis Blues	NHL	5	1	2	3	0	10	2	0	2	4
1982–83	Salt Lake Golden Eagles	CHL	57	23	19	42	140	—	—	—	—	—
1982–83	St. Louis Blues	NHL	18	5	2	7	14	—	—	—	—	—
1983–84	Montana Magic	CHL	8	7	3	10	34	—	—	—	—	—
1983–84	St. Louis Blues	NHL	50	7	5	12	195	9	0	0	0	27
1984–85	St. Louis Blues	NHL	71	9	9	18	146	3	0	0	0	7
1985–86	New Jersey Devils	NHL	51	7	12	19	91	—	—	—	—	—
1986–87	Maine Mariners	AHL	9	5	4	9	42	—	—	—	—	—
1986–87	New Jersey Devils	NHL	57	10	9	19	107	—	—	—	—	—
1987–88	New Jersey Devils	NHL	60	4	6	10	222	10	0	0	0	113
1988–89	New Jersey Devils	NHL	39	3	6	9	128	—	—	—	—	—
1989–90	Utica Devils	AHL	71	13	17	30	128	5	0	0	0	24
1990–91	Utica Devils	AHL	68	19	14	33	245	—	—	—	—	—
1990–91	New Jersey Devils	NHL	1	0	0	0	5	4	0	1	1	10
1991–92	San Jose Sharks	NHL	48	4	8	12	143	—	—	—	—	—
1992–93	San Diego Gulls	IHL	51	8	13	21	217	5	0	0	0	14
1993–94	Salt Lake Golden Eagles	IHL	2	0	0	0	21	—	—	—	—	—
NHL totals			400	50	59	109	1051	36	2	1	3	161

== See also ==
- Currently works for Krasiva Windows & Doors https://krasivawindows.com/
- List of St. Louis Blues players
- List of New Jersey Devils players
- List of San Jose Sharks players
