= Matt Nieto =

American ice hockey player (born 1992)

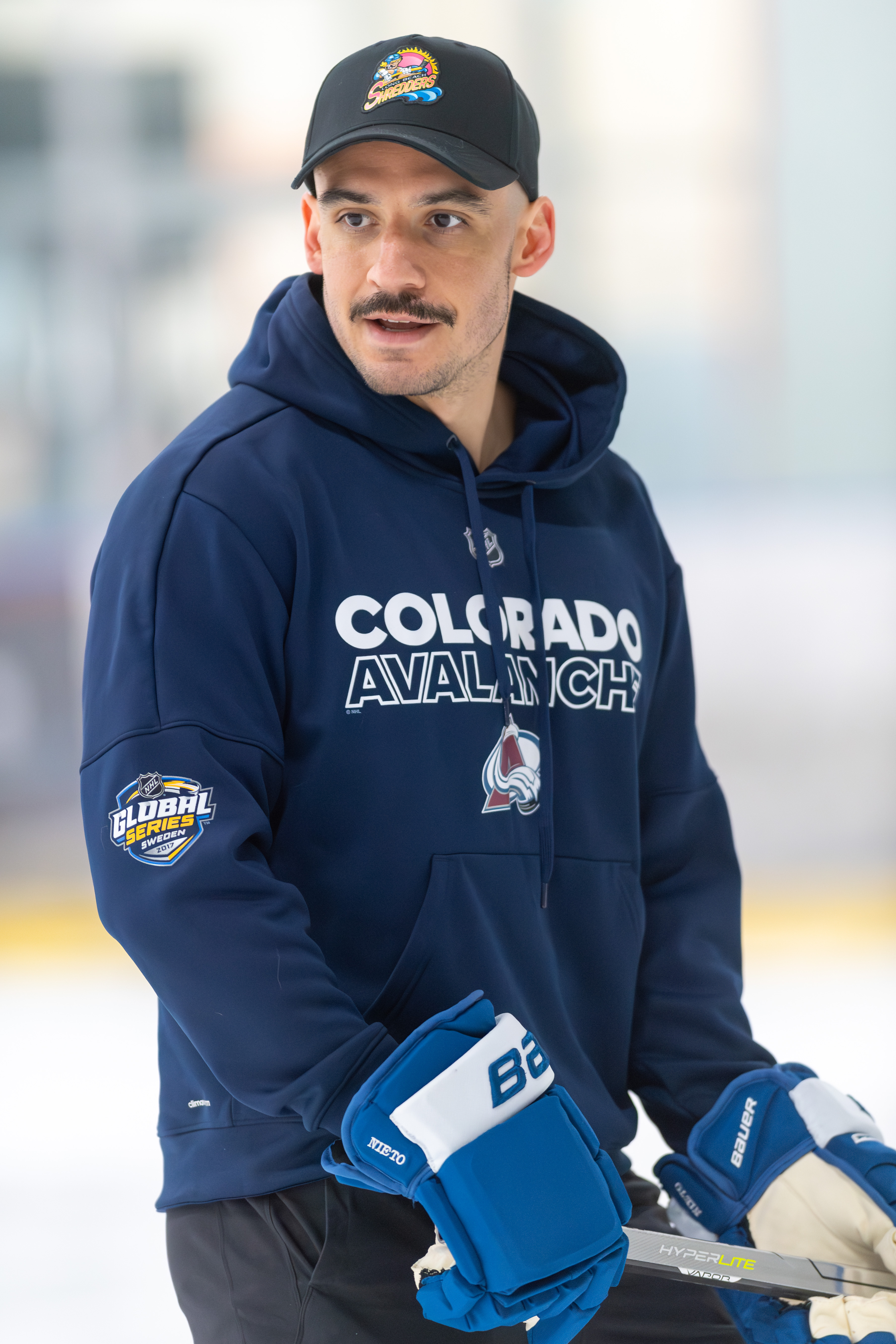
- Nieto in June 2023.
- Born: November 5, 1992 (age 33) Long Beach, California, U.S.
- Height: 5 ft 11 in (180 cm)
- Weight: 187 lb (85 kg; 13 st 5 lb)
- Position: Left wing
- Played for: San Jose Sharks; Colorado Avalanche; Pittsburgh Penguins
- NHL draft: 47th overall, 2011; San Jose Sharks
- Playing career: 2013–2026

Matthew Evan Nieto (born November 5, 1992) is an American former professional ice hockey left winger. He most recently played for the Wilkes-Barre/Scranton Penguins in the American Hockey League (AHL) while under contract to the Pittsburgh Penguins of the National Hockey League (NHL). He previously played two separate stints each for the San Jose Sharks and the Colorado Avalanche. He was drafted by the Sharks in the second round, 47th overall, of the 2011 NHL entry draft.

== Early life and career ==
Nieto is of Mexican-American descent. Nieto's father, Jesse, is a longshoreman, while his mother, Mary, is a Nordstrom makeup artist.

Nieto grew up in Long Beach, California, in a dangerous neighborhood; his mother had stated: "There were drive-by shootings. He jokes about it, that Snoop Dogg lived around the corner. It's true, but Matt wasn't born then."

When he was two years old, Nieto became interested in skating, particularly rollerblading, when he saw his sister skating in the family's house. His grandfather later bought him a hockey stick, and when he was three Nieto began playing roller hockey at the YMCA. As a youth, he played in the 2004 and 2005 Quebec International Pee-Wee Hockey Tournaments with the Los Angeles Hockey Club minor ice hockey team, and was teammates with Emerson Etem and Rocco Grimaldi.

Nieto has a sister with Down syndrome and autism and his mother has battled advanced breast cancer.

== Playing career ==
=== Amateur ===
Nieto began attending Salisbury School, a preparatory school, in Salisbury, Connecticut, at the start of his second year of high school. In one season with the school's hockey team, he scored eight goals and ten assists in 28 games. The performance drew the attention of the USA Hockey National Team Development Program, and Nieto subsequently moved to Ann Arbor, Michigan, to play in the Program. In 2008–09, he played for the under-17 and under-18 teams, scoring 20 goals and 33 assists and six goals and eight assists, respectively. The next season, he played for the Program's United States Hockey League (USHL) team, scoring 15 goals and 14 assists; he also returned to the under-17 team, scoring one goal.

After participating in the Program, Nieto was offered a chance to play major junior hockey for the Tri-City Americans of the Western Hockey League (WHL), but opted to attend college instead and play at the collegiate level. When choosing colleges, Nieto decided between Boston University and Boston College, and elected to attend the former on a full scholarship. In his first year, Nieto scored 10 goals and 13 assists. The next year, he scored 16 goals and 26 assists with a plus-minus rating of +19. In 2012, Nieto scored 18 goals, second-most on the team behind Dan O'Regan, and 19 assists. He ended his Terriers career with 44 goals and 102 points in 115 games.

Nieto was ranked the 43rd-best prospect and the second-best player in the NCAA's Hockey East conference by NHL.com among the 2011 draft class. Hockey's Future stated he had struggled earlier in his career defensively, but had since improved. They added he had "explosive speed", and excels with puck handling and passing while moving. The website gave him a 7.5/10 talent score.

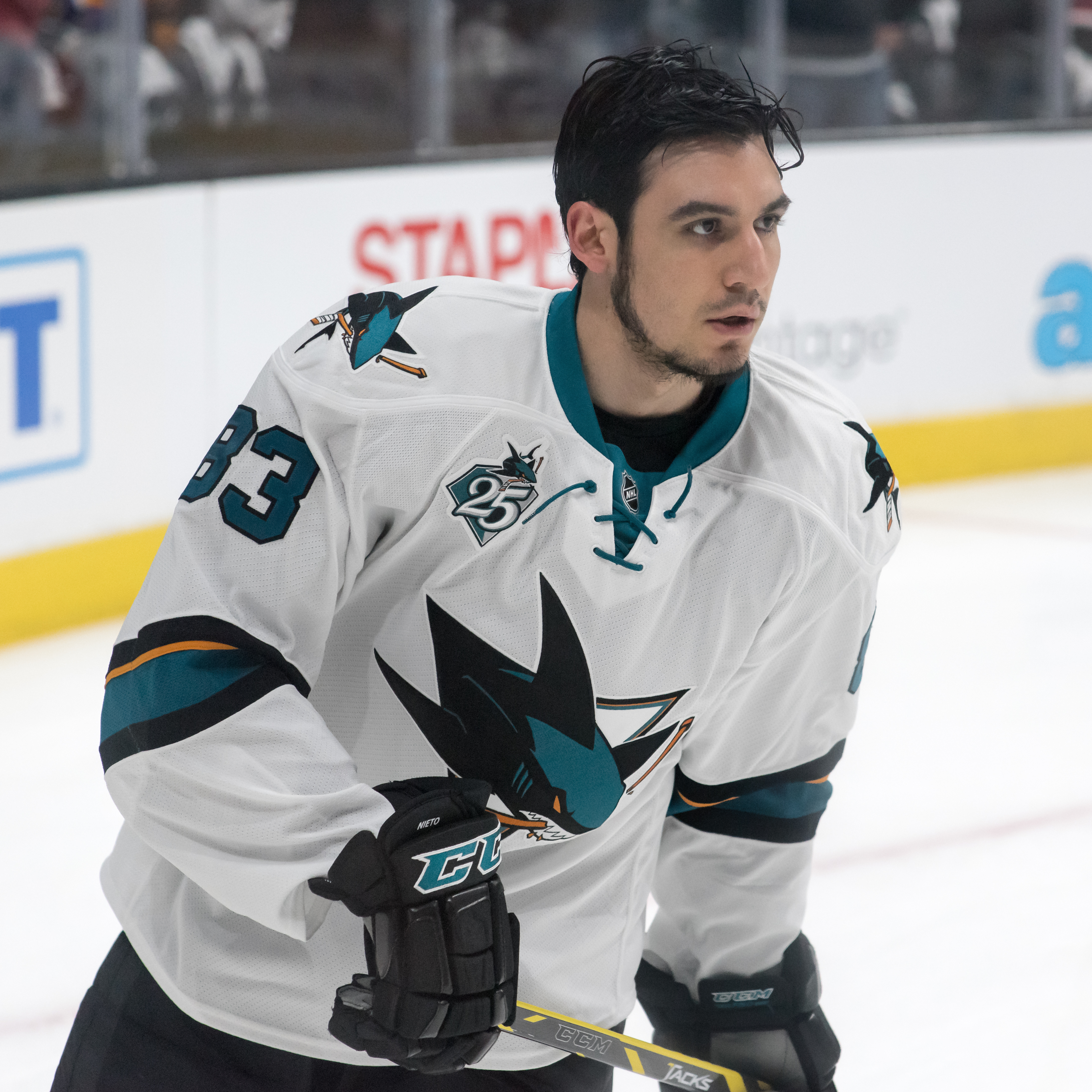
Nieto during his first tenure with the Sharks in 2016.

In the Draft's second round, Nieto was selected by the San Jose Sharks with the 47th overall pick, their first pick of the draft. Nieto became the first Californian to be selected by the team. Regarding Nieto, Sharks Director of Scouting Tim Burke stated, "We were watching this guy over two years now. He has offensive ability on the rush and has shown he can do other roles, like penalty kill."

=== Professional ===
Nieto signed a three-year, $2.3 million contract with the Sharks on April 1, 2013. He spent time with the Sharks' then-American Hockey League (AHL) affiliate, the Worcester Sharks, during the year, playing in 11 games. He scored two goals with four assists, a −4 plus-minus rating and six penalty minutes.

Nieto made his NHL debut against the Vancouver Canucks on October 3, 2013. He scored his first career NHL goal against Henrik Lundqvist of the New York Rangers on October 8, off assists by Joe Pavelski and Tommy Wingels. Nieto, however, returned to Worcester over one month later, on November 25, though he was later recalled on December 7. Despite being reassigned to the San Francisco Bulls of the ECHL on December 18, Nieto was recalled by the Sharks three days later after an injury to forward Tomáš Hertl.

Nieto scored his first career Stanley Cup playoff goal on April 22, 2014, via an empty net goal against the Los Angeles Kings.

In the 2016–17 season, Nieto struggled to retain his role in adding an offensive touch to the Sharks' bottom six forwards. Surpassed in the depth chart, Nieto played in just 16 games with 2 assists before he was placed on waivers in order to gain more playing time. Nieto was claimed off waivers by the Colorado Avalanche the following day, on January 5, 2017.

On July 25, 2017, Nieto and the Avalanche avoided arbitration by agreeing to a one-year, $1 million contract. Nieto set career high's in the 2018 season with 74 games played and 15 goals scored. After the year the Avalanche signed Nieto to a two-year deal worth $3.95 Million in July 2018.

As a free agent for the first time in his career at the conclusion of the 2019–20 season, Nieto returned to the San Jose Sharks in signing a one-year, $700,000 contract on October 13, 2020. In the following 2020–21 season, Nieto contributed to the Sharks forward depth, adding 5 goals and 7 points in 25 games before his season was derailed through injury. He made his 500th NHL career appearance in a game against the St. Louis Blues on March 19, 2021, becoming just the third California native to reach the mark behind Brooks Orpik and Jason Zucker.

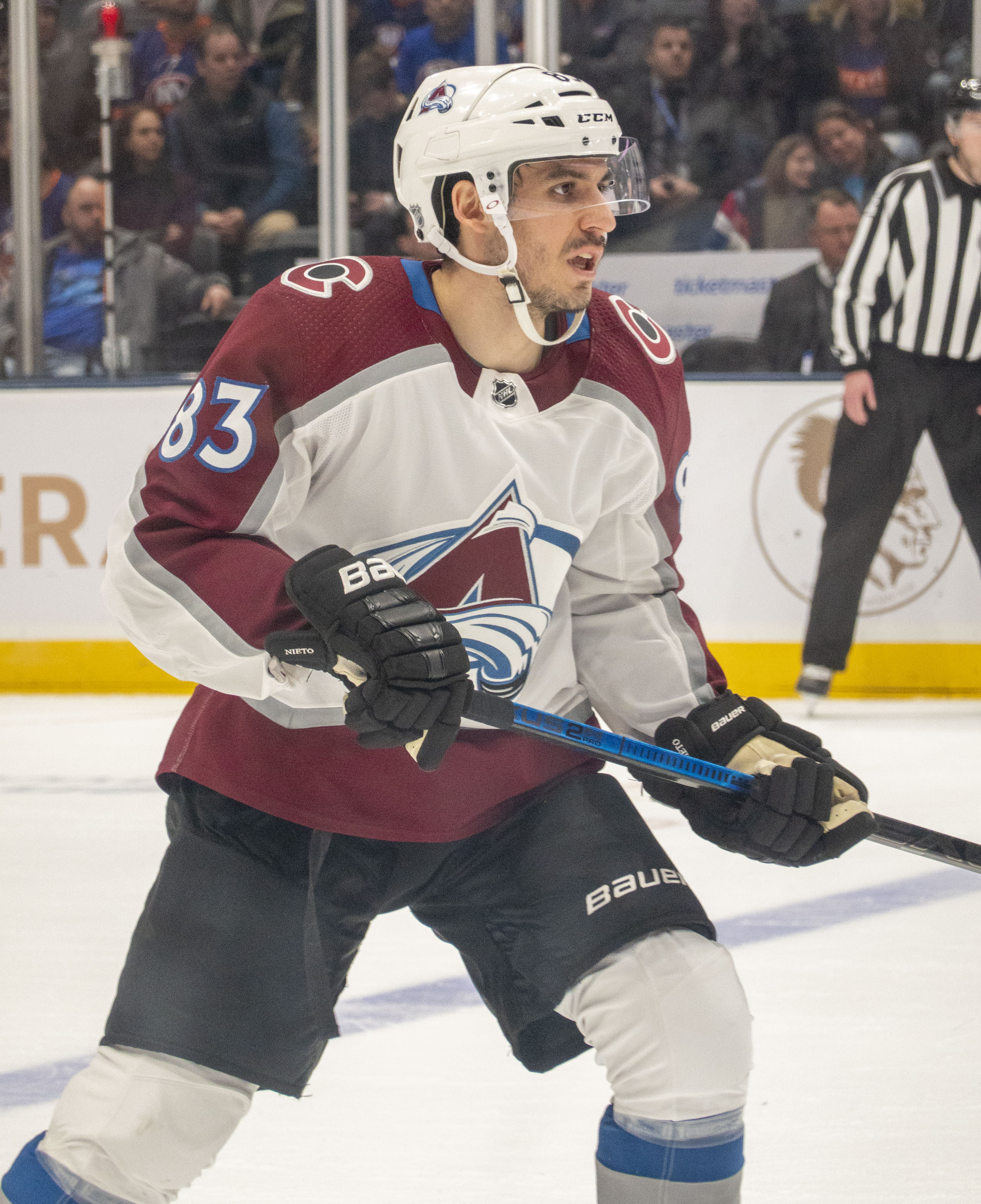
Nieto with the Colorado Avalanche in 2020.

On June 21, 2021, Nieto agreed to a two-year, $1.7 million contract extension to remain with the Sharks. In the 2021–22 season, having returned to full health, Nieto posted 6 goals and 17 points through 70 regular season games, as the Sharks missed the post-season for the third consecutive season.

In his final year under contract with the Sharks in the 2022–23 season, Nieto showed his versatility amongst the Sharks forward-lines, increasing his scoring output when elevated alongside Logan Couture in scoring 8 goals and 15 points through 48 regular season games. With the Sharks out of contention for a playoff berth, Nieto was traded alongside Ryan Merkley in a return to the Avalanche, in exchange for Martin Kaut and Jacob MacDonald on January 25, 2023. He completed the season combining his offensive output between the Sharks and Avalanche to finish with 12 goals and 24 points, both the second highest totals of his career. He was scoreless in 7 playoff contests with the injury struck Avalanche in a first-round defeat to the Seattle Kraken.

As a free agent, Nieto left the Avalanche to sign a two-year, $1.8 million contract with the Pittsburgh Penguins on July 1, 2023.

== International play ==
Medal record

Representing United States

Ice hockey

IIHF World U18 Championships
Gold medal – first place	2009 United States	
Gold medal – first place	2010 Belarus	

Nieto was first selected to represent the United States at the 2009 IIHF World U18 Championships, posting four goals in seven games to help capture the gold medal. He was reselected the following year and successfully defended Team USA's gold medal at the 2010 IIHF World U18 Championships.

== Career statistics ==
=== Regular season and playoffs ===
			Regular season					Playoffs
Season	Team	League	GP	G	A	Pts	PIM	GP	G	A	Pts	PIM
2007–08	Salisbury School	HS-Prep	23	8	10	18		—	—	—	—	—
2008–09	U.S. NTDP U17	USDP	13	9	9	18	8	—	—	—	—	—
2008–09	U.S. NTDP U18	USDP	13	6	8	14	14	—	—	—	—	—
2008–09	U.S. NTDP U18	NAHL	38	11	24	35	14	—	—	—	—	—
2009–10	U.S. NTDP Juniors	USHL	24	15	14	29	19	—	—	—	—	—
2009–10	U.S. NTDP U17	USDP	3	1	0	1	0	—	—	—	—	—
2009–10	U.S. NTDP U18	USDP	54	28	26	54	31	—	—	—	—	—
2010–11	Boston University	HE	39	10	13	23	16	—	—	—	—	—
2011–12	Boston University	HE	37	16	26	42	26	—	—	—	—	—
2012–13	Boston University	HE	39	18	19	37	24	—	—	—	—	—
2012–13	Worcester Sharks	AHL	11	2	4	6	0	—	—	—	—	—
2013–14	San Jose Sharks	NHL	66	10	14	24	16	7	2	3	5	0
2013–14	Worcester Sharks	AHL	2	2	3	5	0	—	—	—	—	—
2014–15	San Jose Sharks	NHL	72	10	17	27	20	—	—	—	—	—
2015–16	San Jose Sharks	NHL	67	8	9	17	10	16	1	2	3	8
2016–17	San Jose Sharks	NHL	16	0	2	2	4	—	—	—	—	—
2016–17	Colorado Avalanche	NHL	43	7	4	11	4	—	—	—	—	—
2017–18	Colorado Avalanche	NHL	74	15	11	26	14	6	0	3	3	2
2018–19	Colorado Avalanche	NHL	64	4	19	23	8	12	4	3	7	2
2019–20	Colorado Avalanche	NHL	70	8	13	21	6	14	1	2	3	4
2020–21	San Jose Sharks	NHL	28	5	2	7	4	—	—	—	—	—
2021–22	San Jose Sharks	NHL	70	6	11	17	19	—	—	—	—	—
2022–23	San Jose Sharks	NHL	45	8	7	15	8	—	—	—	—	—
2022–23	Colorado Avalanche	NHL	36	4	5	9	8	7	0	0	0	2
2023–24	Pittsburgh Penguins	NHL	22	1	3	4	4	—	—	—	—	—
2024–25	Wilkes-Barre/Scranton Penguins	AHL	15	3	4	7	8	—	—	—	—	—
2024–25	Pittsburgh Penguins	NHL	32	1	2	3	4	—	—	—	—	—
NHL totals			705	87	119	206	129	62	8	13	21	18

=== International ===
Year	Team	Event	Result	GP	G	A	Pts	PIM
2009	United States	WHC17	3rd place, bronze medalist(s)	6	3	3	6	6
2009	United States	WJC18	1st place, gold medalist(s)	7	4	0	4	12
2010	United States	WJC18	1st place, gold medalist(s)	7	1	3	4	4
Junior totals				20	8	6	14	22
