= Jacob MacDonald =

American ice hockey player (born 1993)

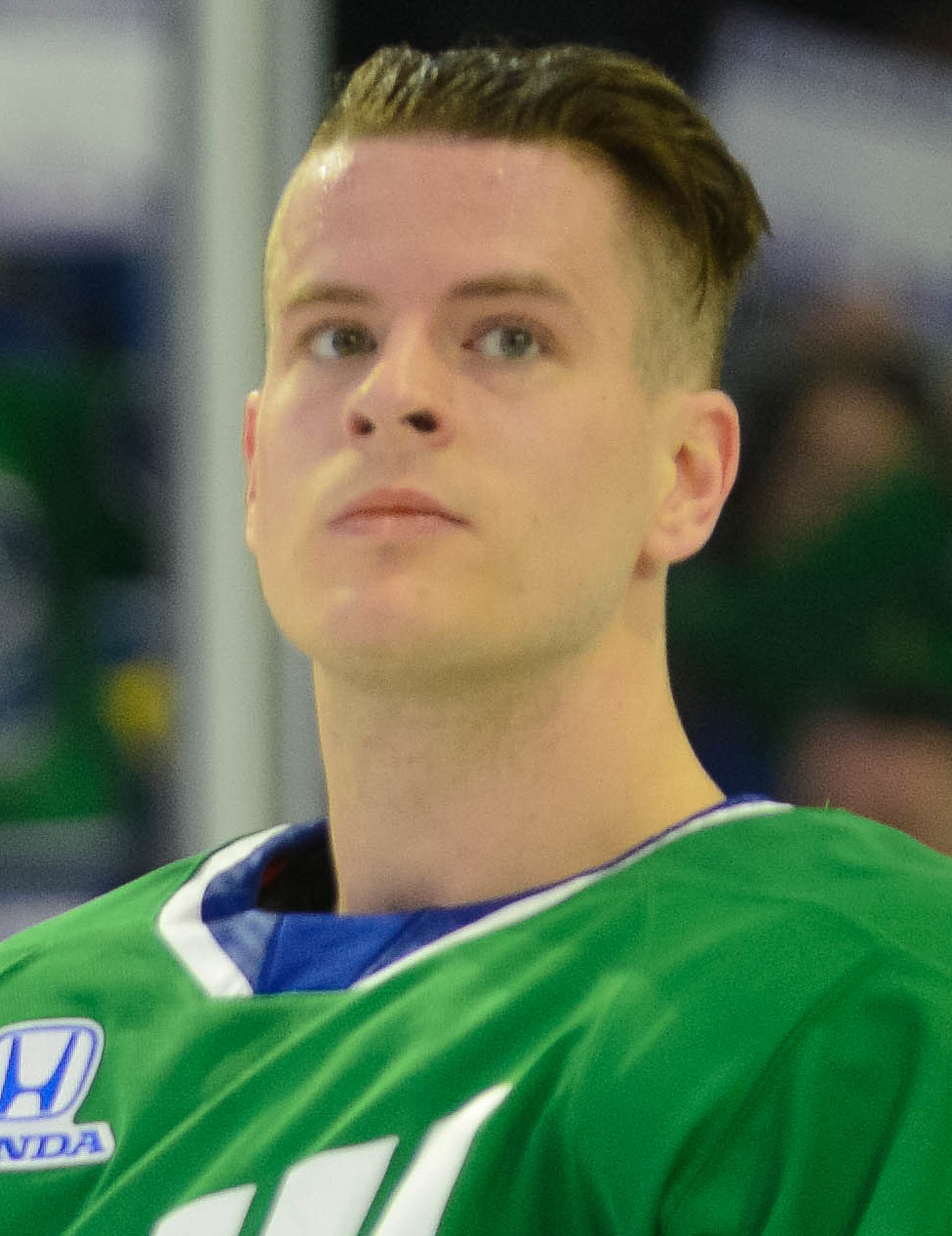
- MacDonald at the 2018 AHL All-Star Game
- Born: February 26, 1993 (age 33) Portland, Oregon, U.S.
- Height: 6 ft 0 in (183 cm)
- Weight: 204 lb (93 kg; 14 st 8 lb)
- Position: Defence/Right wing
- Shoots: Left
- NHL team (P) Cur. team Former teams: Washington Capitals; Hershey Bears (AHL); Florida Panthers; Colorado Avalanche; San Jose Sharks
- NHL draft: Undrafted
- Playing career: 2015–present

Jacob Edward MacDonald (born February 26, 1993) is an American professional ice hockey players who is a defenceman for the Hershey Bears in the American Hockey League (AHL) while under contract to the Washington Capitals of the National Hockey League (NHL).

== Playing career ==
MacDonald grew up in Brighton, Michigan, where he played in Compuware's midget hockey program before progressing to junior hockey in the United States Hockey League with the Waterloo Black Hawks. He committed to and played collegiate hockey at Cornell University in the ECAC Hockey League. While developing his defensive awareness with Cornell, MacDonald struggled offensively at the collegiate level, registering just 21 points through 104 games in his four-year career.

As a free agent following his senior season with the Big Red in 2014–15, MacDonald made his professional debut in signing with the Elmira Jackals of the ECHL to end the regular season on March 26, 2015. In continuing with the Jackals in the 2015–16 season, MacDonald rediscovered his offensive touch in recording 17 goals and 37 points from the blueline to be selected to the ECHL's All-Rookie Team. He made his debut in the American Hockey League appearing in a one-game on loan with the Springfield Falcons.

In the 2016–17 season, MacDonald returned to the ECHL with the Toledo Walleye before signing an initial try-out contract with the Albany Devils, the New Jersey Devils farm team, on January 5, 2017. In making an early impression with Albany he soon secured an AHL deal for the remainder of the season and an extension after he scored eight goals and 24 points in 34 games to close out the year.

In his first full season in the AHL in 2017–18, MacDonald led the league's defensemen with 20 goals and 55 points and earned an AHL All-Star berth with the Binghamton Devils. Despite missing the post-season, he was selected to the AHL's First All-Star Team.

As a free agent, MacDonald opted to leave the Devils organization and sign his first NHL contract in agreeing to a two-year, two-way contract with the Florida Panthers on July 3, 2018. After attending the Panthers 2018 training camp, MacDonald impressed to make Florida's roster for the 2018–19 season. He made his NHL debut on opening night, and scored on just his third shift, and first career shot in a 2–1 shootout defeat to the Tampa Bay Lightning on October 6, 2018. After two games with the Panthers MacDonald was reassigned to AHL affiliate, the Springfield Thunderbirds, for the remainder of the season. MacDonald assumed a top-pairing role with the Thunderbirds and in 72 games he led all blueliners in scoring with 14 goals and 43 points.

Following his first season in Florida, on June 29, 2019, MacDonald was traded by the Panthers to the Colorado Avalanche in exchange for Dominic Toninato.

MacDonald was suspended for two games on April 8, 2021, following a hit on Ryan Hartman.

In the 2022–23 season, MacDonald began the season as a healthy scratch on the Avalanche opening roster. With the team suffering through a blight of injuries, MacDonald was inserted into the lineup in both defensive and forward roles through the first half of the season, registering just 2 assists through 33 games. On January 25, 2023, MacDonald was traded by the Avalanche alongside Martin Kaut to the San Jose Sharks in exchange for Matt Nieto and Ryan Merkley.

At the conclusion of his contract with the Sharks, MacDonald as a free agent returned to the Colorado Avalanche, inking a two-year, two-way deal on July 1, 2024. In his first season playing for the AHL affiliate Colorado Eagles, he scored 31 goals, the most ever in a single season for an AHL blueliner. He tied his career high in points (55), and was given the Eddie Shore Award as the top defenseman in the league, as well as being named a First Team All-Star for the second time.

Two weeks before commencing the Avalanche's training camp for the 2025–26 season, MacDonald underwent hip surgery, sidelining him for the majority of the season. MacDonald returned at the tail end of the regular season with the Colorado Eagles, posting 12 points through 17 appearances. He led the Eagles to the Conference finals in the 2026 Calder Cup playoffs, adding 2 points in 17 post-season games.

As a free agent from the Avalanche, MacDonald was signed to a one-year, two-way contract with the Washington Capitals for the 2026–27 season on July 5, 2026.

== Career statistics ==
			Regular season					Playoffs
Season	Team	League	GP	G	A	Pts	PIM	GP	G	A	Pts	PIM
2009–10	Compuware	T1EHL	28	4	11	15	14	—	—	—	—	—
2009–10	Waterloo Black Hawks	USHL	29	4	6	10	8	2	0	0	0	0
2010–11	Waterloo Black Hawks	USHL	58	8	22	30	42	2	1	0	1	0
2011–12	Cornell University	ECAC	8	0	1	1	2	—	—	—	—	—
2012–13	Cornell University	ECAC	33	0	3	3	39	—	—	—	—	—
2013–14	Cornell University	ECAC	32	2	6	8	4	—	—	—	—	—
2014–15	Cornell University	ECAC	31	2	7	9	8	—	—	—	—	—
2014–15	Elmira Jackals	ECHL	8	1	2	3	2	—	—	—	—	—
2015–16	Elmira Jackals	ECHL	72	17	20	37	34	—	—	—	—	—
2015–16	Springfield Falcons	AHL	1	0	0	0	0	—	—	—	—	—
2016–17	Toledo Walleye	ECHL	30	7	19	26	24	—	—	—	—	—
2016–17	Albany Devils	AHL	34	8	16	24	9	2	0	0	0	0
2017–18	Binghamton Devils	AHL	75	20	35	55	35	—	—	—	—	—
2018–19	Florida Panthers	NHL	2	1	0	1	0	—	—	—	—	—
2018–19	Springfield Thunderbirds	AHL	72	14	29	43	27	—	—	—	—	—
2019–20	Colorado Eagles	AHL	56	16	26	42	22	—	—	—	—	—
2020–21	Colorado Avalanche	NHL	33	1	8	9	8	—	—	—	—	—
2021–22	Colorado Eagles	AHL	33	10	15	25	30	7	1	4	5	2
2021–22	Colorado Avalanche	NHL	8	0	0	0	2	—	—	—	—	—
2022–23	Colorado Avalanche	NHL	33	0	2	2	11	—	—	—	—	—
2022–23	San Jose Sharks	NHL	25	1	5	6	12	—	—	—	—	—
2023–24	San Jose Sharks	NHL	34	7	2	9	23	—	—	—	—	—
2023–24	San Jose Barracuda	AHL	6	0	4	4	2	—	—	—	—	—
2024–25	Colorado Eagles	AHL	63	31	24	55	46	9	0	4	4	4
2025–26	Colorado Eagles	AHL	17	4	8	12	2	17	1	1	2	4
NHL totals			135	10	17	27	56	—	—	—	—	—

== Awards and honors ==
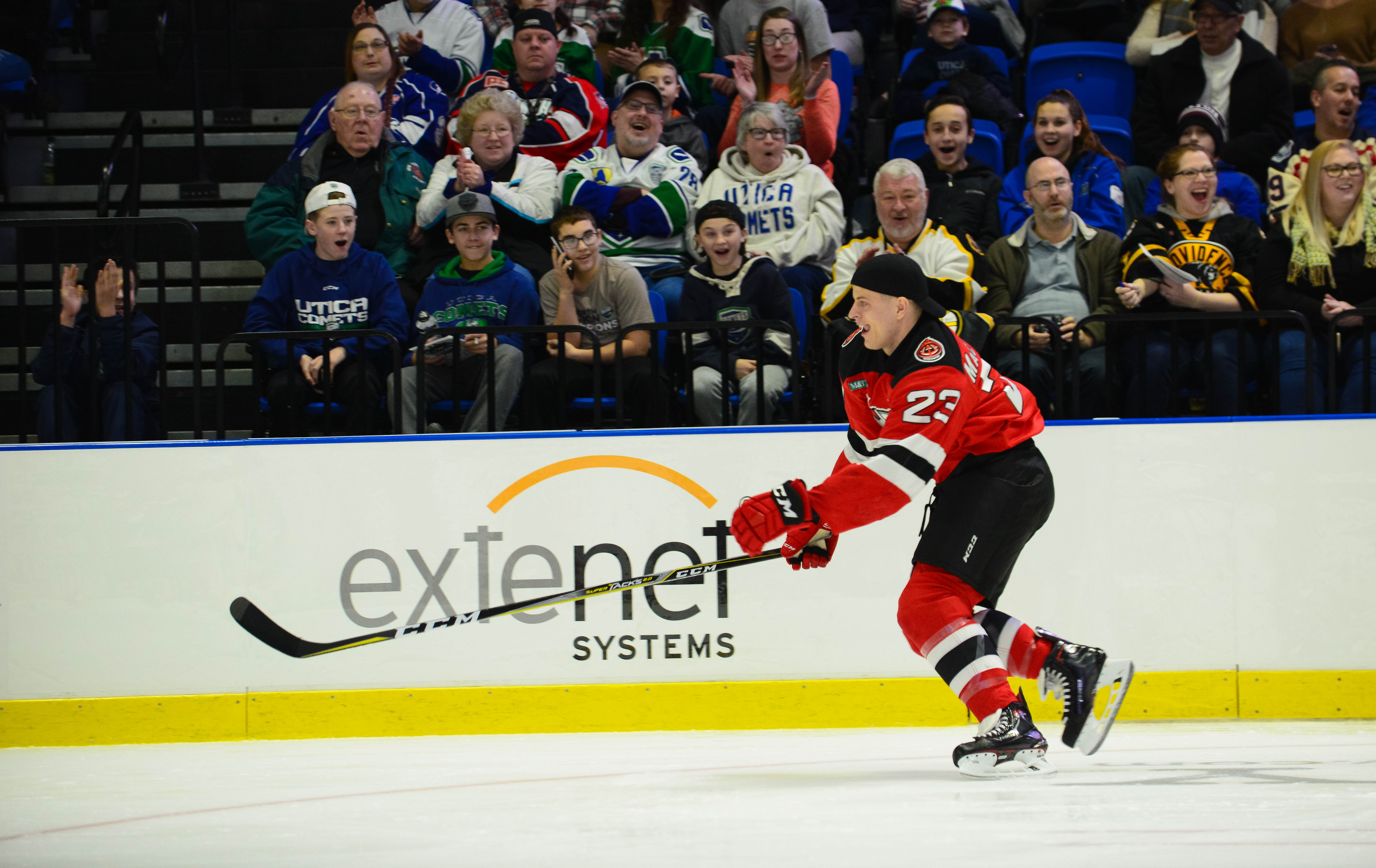
MacDonald representing the Binghamton Devils at the 2018 All-Star Game.

Award	Year
ECHL
All-Rookie Team	2016
AHL
All-Star Game	2018
First All-Star Team	2018, 2025
Second All-Star Team	2020
Eddie Shore Award	2025
