= Ryan Merkley (ice hockey) =

Canadian ice hockey player (born 2000)

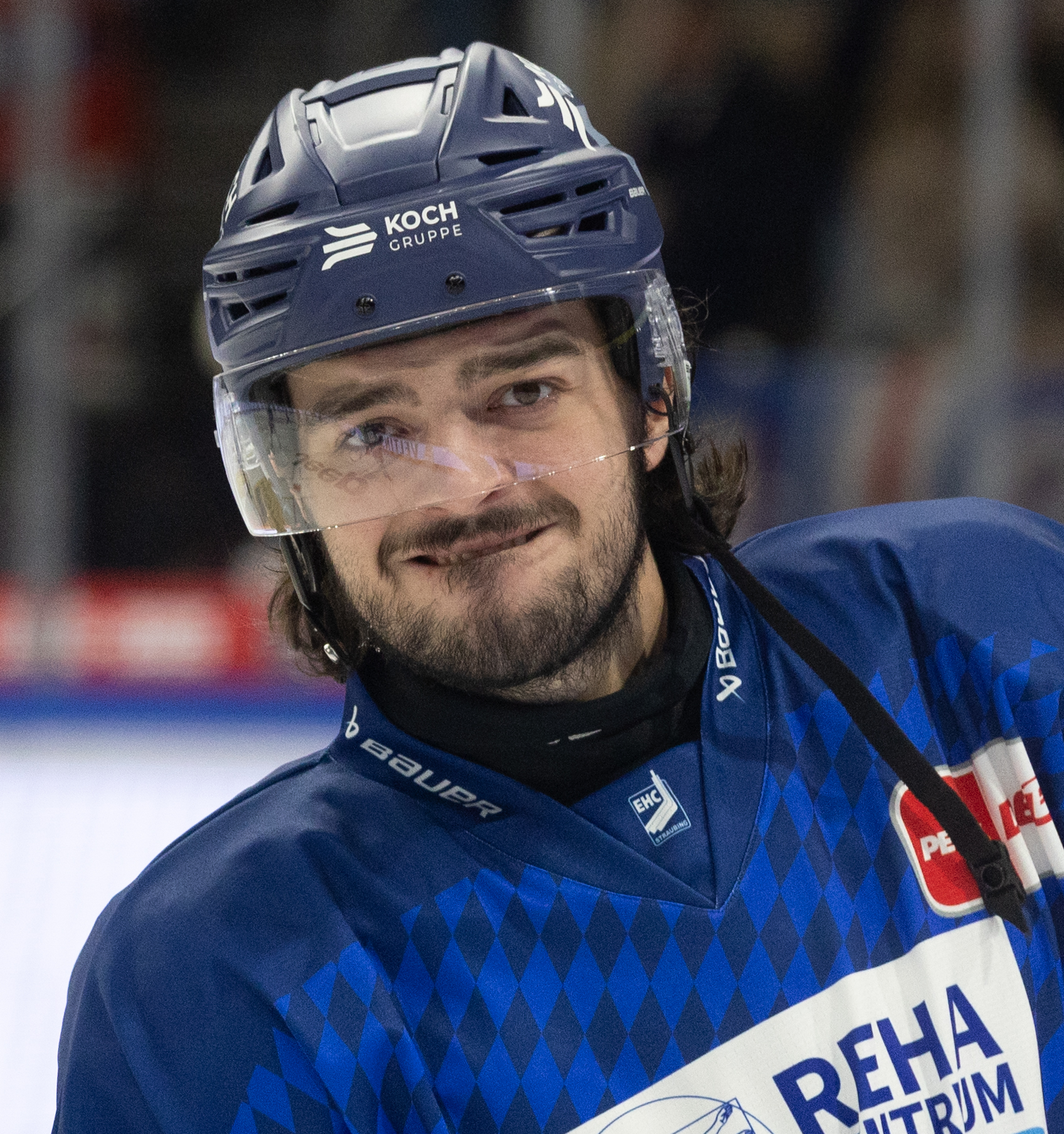
- Ryan Merkley, 2026
- Born: August 14, 2000 (age 26) Oakville, Ontario, Canada
- Height: 5 ft 11 in (180 cm)
- Weight: 186 lb (84 kg; 13 st 4 lb)
- Position: Defence
- Shoots: Right
- DEL team Former teams: Straubing Tigers; San Jose Sharks; Kunlun Red Star; Avangard Omsk
- NHL draft: 21st overall, 2018; San Jose Sharks
- Playing career: 2019–present

Ryan Merkley (born August 14, 2000) is a Canadian professional ice hockey defenceman who plays for the Straubing Tigers of the Deutsche Eishockey Liga (DEL). Merkley was drafted in the first round, 21st overall, by the San Jose Sharks in the 2018 NHL entry draft.

== Playing career ==
=== Minor Hockey ===
Merkley played his U16 year with the Toronto Jr. Canadiens of the Greater Toronto Hockey League (GTHL). He was also called up and played 2 games with the Jr. Canadiens of the Ontario Junior Hockey League (OJHL).

=== Junior ===
==== Guelph Storm (2016–18) ====
Merkley was drafted first overall by the Guelph Storm in the 2016 OHL Priority Selection.

Merkley played in his first career OHL game on September 23, 2016, as he recorded an assist in a 5–1 victory over the Saginaw Spirit. On October 8, Merkley recorded his first career multi-point game, as he recorded three assists in a 5–4 loss to the Hamilton Bulldogs. Two days later, on October 10, Merkley scored his first career OHL goal, as he scored against Dawson Carty of the Kitchener Rangers in an 8–4 loss. On December 7, Merkley registered his first career multi-goal game, as he scored twice against Aidan Hughes of the Sarnia Sting in a 5–4 loss. Merkley recorded his second career three-point game four days later, as he scored two goals, including the overtime winner, while adding an assist in a 4–3 win over the Kingston Frontenacs. Overall, Merkley scored 12 goals and 55 points in his rookie season, while appearing in 62 games. Merkley was awarded the Emms Family Award as the OHL Rookie of the Year for the 2016–17 season.

Merkley returned to Guelph for the 2017–18 season, as he started the season off with two goals and nine points in his first six games. On November 12, Merkley recorded his first career four point game, as he recorded four assists in a 5–1 win over the Sudbury Wolves. Just over a month later, on December 15, Merkley scored a goal and three assists for his second career four point game in a 5–4 victory over the Kingston Frontenacs. Merkley finished the regular season with 13 goals and 67 points in 63 games for the Storm, helping the club reach the post-season. On March 23, Merkley appeared in his first career OHL post-season game, earning an assist in a 7–2 loss to the Kitchener Rangers. In the third game of the series against Kitchener, Merkley recorded his first multi-point game of his OHL career, recording two assists in a 7–5 win. The following night, Merkley again earned two assists in a 6–4 win. On April 1, in the sixth game of the series against the Rangers, Merkley scored his first career OHL playoff goal against Mario Culina, however, the Rangers won the game 5–2 to take the series victory.

On September 27, 2018, Merkley was assigned to the Storm by his NHL club, the San Jose Sharks, for the 2018–19 season. On November 3, Merkley recorded four assists in a 5–4 shootout loss to the Saginaw Spirit. On December 14, 2018, the Storm announced that they traded Merkley to the Peterborough Petes for Pavel Gogolev and draft picks. In 28 games with the Storm, Merkley scored five goals and 39 points.

==== Peterborough Petes (2018–19) ====
Merkley finished the 2018–19 season with the Peterborough Petes. On December 16, Merkley appeared in his first game with his new club, as he recorded three assists in a 6–3 win over the Ottawa 67's. On January 10, Merkley scored his first goal with Peterborough, scoring against Kyle Keyser of the Oshawa Generals in a 6–5 overtime loss. On March 9, Merkley recorded his first two-goal game with the Petes, scoring twice, as well as adding an assist, in a 5–4 win over the Barrie Colts. In 35 games with the Petes, Merkley scored nine goals and 32 points. In 63 games during the season split between the Guelph Storm and Peterborough, Merkley scored 14 goals and 71 points. On March 22, Merkley played in his first playoff game with Peterborough, as he was held to no points in a 7–0 loss to the Oshawa Generals. In the fifth game of the series, played on March 30, Merkley recorded his first playoff point with the Petes, an assist, in a 4–2 series ending loss.

==== London Knights (2019–20) ====
At the start of the 2019–20 season, it was announced that Merkley was traded from Peterborough to the London Knights in exchange for future draft picks. Merkley appeared in his first game with the Knights on September 27, 2019, earning two assists in a 6–2 victory over the Erie Otters. In his second game with the club, Merkley had three more assists in a 7–3 victory over the Hamilton Bulldogs. On October 4, Merkley scored his first goal for London, scoring against Cedrick Andree of the Ottawa 67's in a 3–0 win. On February 14, Merkley scored a season-high four points in a game, as he recorded four assists in a 6–3 win over the Kitchener Rangers. Overall, Merkley scored 15 goals and 76 points in 60 games for the Knights, as his point total was the second highest among all OHL defencemen during the season.

=== Professional ===
==== San Jose Sharks (2018–2023) ====
On June 22, 2018, he was selected with the 21st pick in the 2018 NHL entry draft by the San Jose Sharks. He signed a three-year, entry-level contract with the Sharks on July 18, 2018. Prior to the 2018–19 season, Merkley was invited to the Sharks training camp but was cut from camp on September 27 and reassigned to Guelph Storm of the Ontario Hockey League.

Following the conclusion of his junior season in 2018–19, the Sharks assigned Merkley to their American Hockey League affiliate, the San Jose Barracuda. Merkley played in his first career AHL game on April 12, 2019 against the Colorado Eagles, and had two shots on goal in a 3–1 win. Merkley appeared in two regular season games, earning no points. On April 17, Merkley appeared in his first career AHL playoff game, a 6–5 overtime loss to the San Diego Gulls. In four post-season games, Merkley was held to no points.

In the following 2021–22 season, Merkley made his NHL debut for the Sharks on October 30, 2021, in a 2–1 win over the Winnipeg Jets. Three days later, Merkley scored his first goal in a 5–3 victory against the Buffalo Sabres. In splitting the season between the Sharks and Barracuda, Merkley contributed with 1 goal and 6 points through 39 games from the blueline for the Sharks.

Approaching the 2022–23 season, Merkley was unable to make the Sharks opening roster, and was assigned to continue his development in the AHL with the Barracuda. Merkley added 14 assists through 30 games with the San Jose Barracuda before remaining a healthy scratch after requesting a trade away from the Sharks organization on January 1, 2023.

==== Colorado Avalanche (2023) ====
Merkley's trade request was accommodated when he was dealt, along with Matt Nieto, to the Colorado Avalanche in exchange for fellow 2018 first-round pick Martin Kaut and defenceman Jacob MacDonald on January 25, 2023. He was immediately reassigned by the Avalanche to their AHL affiliate, the Colorado Eagles. Merkley made 28 regular season appearances with the Eagles, contributing with 2 goals and 8 points, however, was a healthy scratch for the club through the playoffs. As an impending restricted free agent, Merkley was not tendered a qualifying offer by the Avalanche and was released as a free agent.

==== KHL ====
On August 18, 2023, Merkley signed a one-year contract with Kunlun Red Star of the Kontinental Hockey League. Over a season and a half with Kunlun, Merkley produced 37 points and 82 penalty minutes in 83 games.

During the 2024–25 season, on November 23, 2024, Merkley was traded within the KHL from Kunlun to Avangard Omsk in exchange for cash. After recording 12 points in 29 games with Omsk, Merkley’s contract was terminated by mutual agreement on March 1, 2025, according to the club’s website, “due to the player’s family-related situation.”

DEL

In November 2025, Merkley signed with the Straubing Tigers of the Deutsche Eishockey Liga (DEL). On May 5th, 2026, Merkley was released from the Straubing Tigers.

== Career statistics ==
=== Regular season and playoffs ===
			Regular season					Playoffs
Season	Team	League	GP	G	A	Pts	PIM	GP	G	A	Pts	PIM
2015–16	Toronto Jr. Canadiens	OJHL	2	0	0	0	0	—	—	—	—	—
2016–17	Guelph Storm	OHL	62	12	43	55	50	—	—	—	—	—
2017–18	Guelph Storm	OHL	63	13	54	67	63	6	1	5	6	10
2018–19	Guelph Storm	OHL	28	5	34	39	30	—	—	—	—	—
2018–19	Peterborough Petes	OHL	35	9	23	32	36	5	0	1	1	8
2018–19	San Jose Barracuda	AHL	2	0	0	0	0	4	0	0	0	0
2019–20	London Knights	OHL	60	15	61	76	48	—	—	—	—	—
2020–21	San Jose Barracuda	AHL	31	1	10	11	14	4	0	1	1	2
2021–22	San Jose Barracuda	AHL	30	1	18	19	30	—	—	—	—	—
2021–22	San Jose Sharks	NHL	39	1	5	6	8	—	—	—	—	—
2022–23	San Jose Barracuda	AHL	30	0	14	14	26	—	—	—	—	—
2022–23	Colorado Eagles	AHL	28	2	6	8	38	—	—	—	—	—
2023–24	Kunlun Red Star	KHL	64	3	26	29	54	—	—	—	—	—
2024–25	Kunlun Red Star	KHL	19	1	7	8	28	—	—	—	—	—
2024–25	Avangard Omsk	KHL	29	1	11	12	12	—	—	—	—	—
2025–26	Straubing Tigers	DEL	26	1	9	10	19	6	0	6	6	4
NHL totals			39	1	5	6	8	—	—	—	—	—
KHL totals			112	5	44	49	94	—	—	—	—	—

=== International ===
Year	Team	Event	Result	GP	G	A	Pts	PIM
2016	Canada Red	U17	5th	5	2	0	2	8
2017	Canada	IH18	1st place, gold medalist(s)	5	0	6	6	10
2018	Canada	U18	5th	5	0	3	3	2
Junior totals				15	2	9	11	20

== Awards and honours ==
Award	Year
OHL
First All-Rookie Team	2017
Emms Family Award	2017

Awards and achievements
Preceded by David Levin	Jack Ferguson Award; 2016	Succeeded by Ryan Suzuki
Preceded by Josh Norris	San Jose Sharks first-round draft pick 2018	Succeeded by Ozzy Wiesblatt
