= Martin Kaut =

Czech ice hockey player (born 1999)

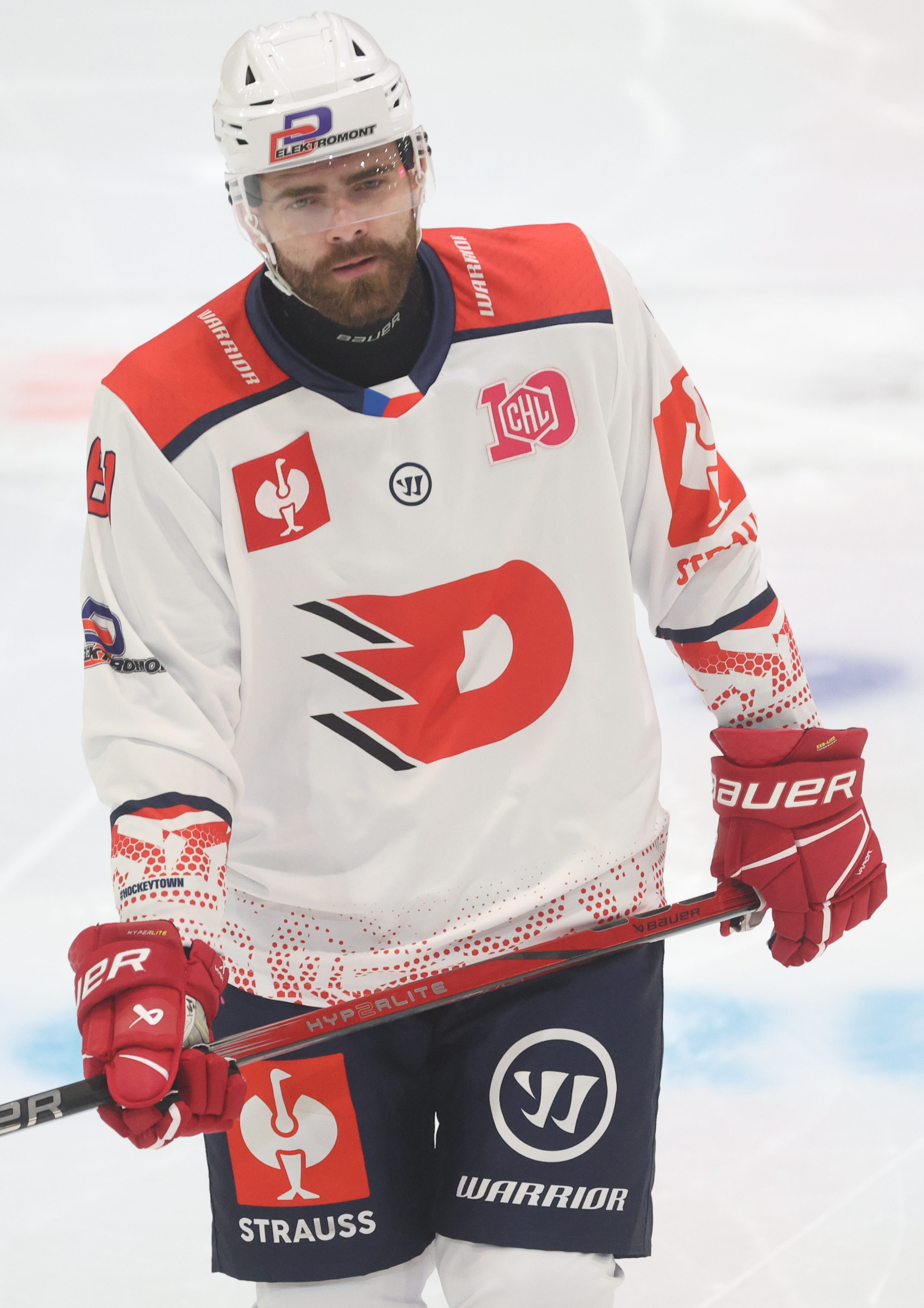
- Kaut in 2024
- Born: 2 October 1999 (age 27) Brno, Czech Republic
- Height: 6 ft 2 in (188 cm)
- Weight: 190 lb (86 kg; 13 st 8 lb)
- Position: Right wing
- Shoots: Right
- ELH team Former teams: HC Dynamo Pardubice; Colorado Avalanche; San Jose Sharks
- National team: Czech Republic
- NHL draft: 16th overall, 2018; Colorado Avalanche
- Playing career: 2016–present

Martin Kaut (born 2 October 1999) is a Czech professional ice hockey player who is a right winger for HC Dynamo Pardubice of the Czech Extraliga (ELH). He was selected by the Colorado Avalanche in the first round,16th overall, in the 2018 NHL entry draft.

== Playing career ==
=== Czech Republic ===
Kaut played junior hockey with youth club, HC Žďár nad Sázavou, through to the under-16 level. As a natural Winger, Kaut showed initial potential for a nose to the net by scoring the most goals on the Czech U16 team with 37 in the 2014–15 season.

Signed to professional club, HC Dynamo Pardubice, Kaut played in their junior U18 and U20 teams, before making his professional debut as a 17-year old in the Czech Extraliga during the 2016–17 season. He registered 1 assist in 26 games, while splitting the season with the under-20 team, registering 16 points in 22 games. As an emerging NHL eligible draft prospect, he was selected 24th overall in the 2017 CHL Import Draft by major junior club, the Brandon Wheat Kings of the Western Hockey League (WHL).

Opting to continue with professional career, and in his first full season with Dynamo Pardubice in 2017–18, Kaut improved his overall impact, showing a strong two-way ability in scoring 9 goals and adding 7 assists for 16 points as the youngest player on the team's roster. He finished the season with the second most points of any player under the age of 20 in the league, only trailing Martin Nečas. Elevating his play in the post-season, Kaut finished tied second on Pardubice in scoring with 5 points in 7 playoff contests.

Kaut's standout play in the Extraliga playoffs and World Juniors led to a rise in the winger's draft stock, climbing from eleventh on the NHL Central Scouting Bureau International skater ranks to finishing the year fourth on the list. However, with the intention to impress at the NHL Scouting Combine, Kaut was unable to participate due to a possible congenital heart condition that was discovered in testing and required minor ablation surgery. Having recovered from surgery, discovering he didn't have the condition that was initially diagnosed, Kaut was able to attend the 2018 NHL entry draft and was selected in the first-round, 16th overall, by the Colorado Avalanche.

=== Colorado Avalanche ===
On 5 July 2018, Kaut was signed a three-year entry-level contract with the Colorado Avalanche. In leaving the Czech Republic, Kaut attended his first training camp with the Avalanche in 2018, and quickly adapted to the North American game through the pre-season, playing in contests alongside Tyson Jost and Alexander Kerfoot. Eligible to continue his development in the American Hockey League due to his European status, Kaut was assigned to primary affiliate, the Colorado Eagles for their inaugural 2018–19 season in the AHL on 27 September 2018.

He made his North American debut and collected an assist in the Eagles opening night overtime defeat to the Chicago Wolves on 5 October 2018. He later notched his first goal in his sixth AHL game, a 5–3 victory over the Ontario Reign on 20 October 2018. In playing on the top two scoring lines with the Eagles, Kaut scored 12 points through 26 games before he was loaned by the Avalanche to participate in the 2019 World Junior Championships on 21 December 2018. Kaut returned to the Eagles following the Tournament, finishing his rookie season with 12 goals and 26 points in 63 regular season games. He recorded his first two playoffs goals in a 5–2 defeat to the Bakersfield Condors on 27 April 2019, unable to prevent the Eagles suffering a 3–1 series defeat in the first-round.

In the following 2019–20 season, after participating in the Avalanche's 2019 training camp, Kaut was among the final two rounds of cuts reassigned to continue his development in the AHL. He opened the season with the Eagles going scoreless in 7 games before suffering a concussion against the San Jose Barracuda on 26 October 2019. He returned after two months and regained his scoring touch in collecting 16 points in 24 games in return from his concussion before earning his first NHL recall by the injury-hit Avalanche on 18 February 2020. He made his NHL debut with the Avalanche playing on the fourth-line in a 3–1 victory over the New York Islanders at the Pepsi Center on 19 February 2020. He registered his first NHL point, a game-winning assist on a J. T. Compher goal, in his next game with the Avalanche of 1–0 win over the Anaheim Ducks on 22 February 2020. In his fourth game, Kaut notched his first NHL goal against Carter Hutton, in a 3–1 victory over the Buffalo Sabres on 26 February 2020. He helped the Avalanche to seven straight victories in his first seven games before he was later returned to Colorado Eagles, due to contract considerations, on 5 March 2020.

Approaching the off-season with the 2020–21 delayed North American season, Kaut remained in the Czech Republic, loaned by the Colorado Avalanche to resume playing with former club, HC Dynamo Pardubice of the ELH on 12 September 2020. In Pardubice's opening home game, Kaut recorded the overtime winner in a 3–2 victory over HC Plzeň on 20 September 2020. Concentrating on playing a two-way physical game, Kaut recorded 1 point in 4 games before the season was paused due to the rising continuance of the COVID pandemic in the Czech Republic. With his initial loan agreement set to expire in early November and with the need to continue to play, Kaut was reassigned by the Avalanche, leaving Dynamo Pardubice to join Swedish HockeyAllsvenskan club, Modo Hockey, on 26 October 2020. Kaut recorded a goal and an assist through his first 4 games with Modo before suffering injury. In returning to health, Kaut played 8 games in total collecting 5 points, before his loan was ended and he returned to North America to prepare for training camp with the Avalanche.

Approaching his fifth year within the Avalanche organization in the 2022–23 season, Kaut failed to make the opening night roster and was familiarly reassigned after clearing waivers to AHL affiliate, the Colorado Eagles. He was soon recalled to the Avalanche due to a spate of injuries and appeared in a career high 27 games in registering just 1 goal and 3 points in a depth forward role.

=== San Jose Sharks ===
On 25 January 2023, while on assignment with the Eagles, Kaut's tenure with the Avalanche ended as he was traded alongside Jacob MacDonald to the San Jose Sharks in exchange for Matt Nieto and fellow 2018 first-round pick, Ryan Merkley. He was immediately reassigned to the Sharks AHL affiliate, the San Jose Barracuda.

=== Return to Pardubice ===
As a restricted free agent with the Sharks in the following off-season, Kaut opted to return to the Czech Republic in signing a two-year contract with his original club, HC Dynamo Pardubice of the ELH, on 6 July 2023, with his NHL rights continued to be held by the Sharks.

== International play ==
Medal record

Men's ice hockey

Representing the Czech Republic

Ivan Hlinka Memorial Tournament
Gold medal – first place	2016 Czech Republic/Slovakia	

Kaut first represented the Czech Republic at the 2016 World U-17 Hockey Challenge, in a 7th-place finish. Kaut had a goal and three assists in five games as a 16-year old and a member of his country's first gold-medal at the 2016 Ivan Hlinka Memorial Tournament.

Kaut emerged as a standout at the 2018 World Junior Championships in Buffalo, New York, where he ranked fourth on the team with 7 points in 7 games en route to a fourth-place finish at the tournament. His five assists were tied for third on the team and second among the Czech forwards, while playing on the top scoring line alongside Filip Zadina and Martin Nečas.

Kaut returned for the 2019 World Junior Championships in Vancouver, British Columbia, after he was loaned during his first professional North American season within the Colorado Avalanche organization. In the opening game of the Tournament, Kaut scored and added the primary assist in a 2–1 overtime victory against Switzerland, to be named player of the game, on 26 December 2018. Helping the Czechs advance to the knockout rounds, Kaut scored the lone goal in a 3–1 elimination defeat to the United States on 2 January 2019. He was selected among the top 3 players for the Czech team in a 7th-place finish.

== Career statistics ==
=== Regular season and playoffs ===
			Regular season					Playoffs
Season	Team	League	GP	G	A	Pts	PIM	GP	G	A	Pts	PIM
2016–17	HC Dynamo Pardubice	Czech.20	22	4	16	22	24	—	—	—	—	—
2016–17	HC Dynamo Pardubice	ELH	26	0	1	1	6	—	—	—	—	—
2017–18	HC Dynamo Pardubice	ELH	38	9	7	16	14	7	3	2	5	4
2018–19	Colorado Eagles	AHL	63	12	14	26	34	4	2	0	2	4
2019–20	Colorado Eagles	AHL	34	5	13	18	33	—	—	—	—	—
2019–20	Colorado Avalanche	NHL	9	2	1	3	2	—	—	—	—	—
2020–21	HC Dynamo Pardubice	ELH	4	1	0	1	2	—	—	—	—	—
2020–21	Modo Hockey	Allsv	8	3	2	5	6	—	—	—	—	—
2020–21	Colorado Avalanche	NHL	5	0	0	0	4	—	—	—	—	—
2020–21	Colorado Eagles	AHL	20	6	10	16	10	2	0	1	1	0
2021–22	Colorado Eagles	AHL	46	19	12	31	26	9	1	4	5	6
2021–22	Colorado Avalanche	NHL	6	0	0	0	0	—	—	—	—	—
2022–23	Colorado Eagles	AHL	10	5	3	8	0	—	—	—	—	—
2022–23	Colorado Avalanche	NHL	27	1	2	3	4	—	—	—	—	—
2022–23	San Jose Barracuda	AHL	19	3	11	14	8	—	—	—	—	—
2022–23	San Jose Sharks	NHL	9	3	2	5	0	—	—	—	—	—
2023–24	HC Dynamo Pardubice	ELH	30	14	15	29	12	16	5	4	9	4
2024–25	HC Dynamo Pardubice	ELH	48	19	21	40	16	—	—	—	—	—
2025–26	HC Dynamo Pardubice	ELH	17	5	5	10	0	16	2	6	8	4
ELH totals			163	48	49	97	50	39	10	12	22	12
NHL totals			56	6	5	11	10	—	—	—	—	—

=== International ===
Year	Team	Event	Result	GP	G	A	Pts	PIM
2015	Czech Republic	U17	7th	5	1	1	2	4
2016	Czech Republic	IH18	1st place, gold medalist(s)	5	1	3	4	6
2017	Czech Republic	U18	7th	5	1	1	2	16
2018	Czech Republic	WJC	4th	7	2	5	7	6
2019	Czech Republic	WJC	7th	5	3	1	4	14
2023	Czechia	WC	8th	7	1	0	1	0
2026	Czechia	WC	5th	8	2	2	4	4
Junior totals				27	8	11	19	46
Senior totals				15	3	2	5	4

Awards and achievements
Preceded by Cale Makar	Colorado Avalanche first-round draft pick 2018	Succeeded by Bowen Byram
