= 2018–19 Florida Panthers season =

National Hockey League team season

2018–19 Florida Panthers
- Division: 5th Atlantic
- Conference: 10th Eastern
- 2018–19 record: 36–32–14
- Home record: 20–13–8
- Road record: 16–19–6
- Goals for: 267
- Goals against: 280

Team information
- General manager: Dale Tallon
- Coach: Bob Boughner
- Captain: Aleksander Barkov
- Alternate captains: Aaron Ekblad; Jonathan Huberdeau; Vincent Trocheck; Keith Yandle
- Arena: BB&T Center
- Average attendance: 13,261
- Minor league affiliate: Springfield Thunderbirds (AHL)

Team leaders
- Goals: Mike Hoffman (36)
- Assists: Jonathan Huberdeau (62)
- Points: Aleksander Barkov (96)
- Penalty minutes: MacKenzie Weegar (64)
- Plus/minus: Nick Bjugstad (+2)
- Wins: Roberto Luongo (18)
- Goals against average: Sam Montembeault (3.04)

The 2018–19 Florida Panthers season was the 25th season for the National Hockey League (NHL) franchise that was established on June 14, 1993. The Panthers were eliminated from playoff contention for the third year in a row for the first time since the 2012–13 season and the 2014–15 season on March 26, 2019, after losing 6–1 to the Montreal Canadiens. This was also the final season for Roberto Luongo, who announced his retirement on June 26, 2019, after playing 19 seasons in the NHL. This would be the last season in which the Panthers did not qualify for the Stanley Cup Playoffs until 2025-26.

== Standings ==
Atlantic Division
| Pos | Team | GP | W | L | OTL | ROW | GF | GA | GD | Pts |
|---|---|---|---|---|---|---|---|---|---|---|
| 1 | p – Tampa Bay Lightning | 82 | 62 | 16 | 4 | 56 | 325 | 222 | +103 | 128 |
| 2 | x – Boston Bruins | 82 | 49 | 24 | 9 | 47 | 259 | 215 | +44 | 107 |
| 3 | x – Toronto Maple Leafs | 82 | 46 | 28 | 8 | 46 | 286 | 251 | +35 | 100 |
| 4 | Montreal Canadiens | 82 | 44 | 30 | 8 | 41 | 249 | 236 | +13 | 96 |
| 5 | Florida Panthers | 82 | 36 | 32 | 14 | 33 | 267 | 280 | −13 | 86 |
| 6 | Buffalo Sabres | 82 | 33 | 39 | 10 | 28 | 226 | 271 | −45 | 76 |
| 7 | Detroit Red Wings | 82 | 32 | 40 | 10 | 29 | 227 | 277 | −50 | 74 |
| 8 | Ottawa Senators | 82 | 29 | 47 | 6 | 29 | 242 | 302 | −60 | 64 |

Source: National Hockey League
p – Clinched Presidents' Trophy; x – Clinched playoff spot

Eastern Conference Wild Card
| Pos | Div | Team | GP | W | L | OTL | ROW | GF | GA | GD | Pts |
|---|---|---|---|---|---|---|---|---|---|---|---|
| 1 | ME | x – Carolina Hurricanes | 82 | 46 | 29 | 7 | 44 | 245 | 223 | +22 | 99 |
| 2 | ME | x – Columbus Blue Jackets | 82 | 47 | 31 | 4 | 45 | 258 | 232 | +26 | 98 |
| 3 | AT | Montreal Canadiens | 82 | 44 | 30 | 8 | 41 | 249 | 236 | +13 | 96 |
| 4 | AT | Florida Panthers | 82 | 36 | 32 | 14 | 33 | 267 | 280 | −13 | 86 |
| 5 | ME | Philadelphia Flyers | 82 | 37 | 37 | 8 | 34 | 244 | 281 | −37 | 82 |
| 6 | ME | New York Rangers | 82 | 32 | 36 | 14 | 26 | 227 | 272 | −45 | 78 |
| 7 | AT | Buffalo Sabres | 82 | 33 | 39 | 10 | 28 | 226 | 271 | −45 | 76 |
| 8 | AT | Detroit Red Wings | 82 | 32 | 40 | 10 | 29 | 227 | 277 | −50 | 74 |
| 9 | ME | New Jersey Devils | 82 | 31 | 41 | 10 | 28 | 222 | 275 | −53 | 72 |
| 10 | AT | Ottawa Senators | 82 | 29 | 47 | 6 | 29 | 242 | 302 | −60 | 64 |

Source: National Hockey League
x – Clinched playoff spot

== Schedule and results ==
=== Preseason ===
The preseason schedule was published on June 14, 2018.

2018 preseason game log: 3–4–0 (Home: 0–3–0; Road: 3–1–0)
| # | Date | Visitor | Score | Home | OT | Decision | Attendance | Record | Recap |
|---|---|---|---|---|---|---|---|---|---|
| 1 | September 17 | Nashville | 5–0 | Florida | | Hutchinson | 5,806 | 0–1–0 | Recap |
| 2 | September 17 | Nashville | 5–3 | Florida | | Montembeault | 7,671 | 0–2–0 | Recap |
| 3 | September 19 | Florida | 5–2 | Montreal | | Luongo | 19,691 | 1–2–0 | Recap |
| 4^{[a]} | September 22 | Florida | 4–3 | Dallas | OT | Reimer | — | 2–2–0 | Recap |
| 5 | September 25 | Florida | 3–2 | Tampa Bay | | Reimer | 11,485 | 3–2–0 | Recap |
| 6^{[b]} | September 27 | Florida | 2–6 | Tampa Bay | | Luongo | — | 3–3–0 | Recap |
| 7 | September 29 | Tampa Bay | 3–2 | Florida | | Luongo | 10,487 | 3–4–0 | Recap |
Notes:^{a} Game was played at BOK Center in Tulsa, Oklahoma.^{b} Game was played at Amway Center in Orlando, Florida.

=== Regular season ===
The regular season schedule was released on June 21, 2018.

2018–19 game log

October: 2–4–3 (Home: 0–2–1; Road: 2–2–2)
| # | Date | Visitor | Score | Home | OT | Decision | Attendance | Record | Pts | Recap |
|---|---|---|---|---|---|---|---|---|---|---|
| 1 | October 6 | Florida | 1–2 | Tampa Bay | SO | Reimer | 19,092 | 0–0–1 | 1 | Recap |
| 2 | October 11 | Columbus | 5–4 | Florida | | Reimer | 14,394 | 0–1–1 | 1 | Recap |
| 3 | October 13 | Vancouver | 3–2 | Florida | | Reimer | 11,953 | 0–2–1 | 1 | Recap |
| 4 | October 16 | Florida | 5–6 | Philadelphia | SO | Hutchinson | 19,038 | 0–2–2 | 2 | Recap |
| 5 | October 19 | Florida | 6–5 | Washington | SO | Hutchinson | 18,506 | 1–2–2 | 4 | Recap |
| 6 | October 20 | Detroit | 4–3 | Florida | OT | Hutchinson | 14,534 | 1–2–3 | 5 | Recap |
| 7 | October 23 | Florida | 2–5 | NY Rangers | | Hutchinson | 17,016 | 1–3–3 | 5 | Recap |
| 8 | October 24 | Florida | 3–2 | NY Islanders | OT | Reimer | 9,743 | 2–3–3 | 7 | Recap |
| 9 | October 27 | Florida | 2–3 | New Jersey | | Reimer | 15,927 | 2–4–3 | 7 | Recap |

November: 8–6–1 (Home: 5–2–1; Road: 3–4–0)
| # | Date | Visitor | Score | Home | OT | Decision | Attendance | Record | Pts | Recap |
|---|---|---|---|---|---|---|---|---|---|---|
| 10^{[a]} | November 1 | Winnipeg | 4–2 | Florida | | Reimer | 13,490 | 2–5–3 | 7 | Recap |
| 11^{[a]} | November 2 | Florida | 4–2 | Winnipeg | | Luongo | 13,490 | 3–5–3 | 9 | Recap |
| 12 | November 8 | Edmonton | 1–4 | Florida | | Luongo | 11,484 | 4–5–3 | 11 | Recap |
| 13 | November 10 | NY Islanders | 2–4 | Florida | | Luongo | 11,947 | 5–5–3 | 13 | Recap |
| 14 | November 11 | Ottawa | 1–5 | Florida | | Reimer | 11,192 | 6–5–3 | 15 | Recap |
| 15 | November 13 | Florida | 2–1 | Philadelphia | | Luongo | 19,147 | 7–5–3 | 17 | Recap |
| 16 | November 15 | Florida | 3–7 | Columbus | | Luongo | 14,872 | 7–6–3 | 17 | Recap |
| 17 | November 17 | Florida | 2–4 | NY Rangers | | Luongo | 18,006 | 7–7–3 | 17 | Recap |
| 18 | November 19 | Florida | 7–5 | Ottawa | | Reimer | 11,750 | 8–7–3 | 19 | Recap |
| 19 | November 21 | Florida | 3–7 | Tampa Bay | | Luongo | 19,092 | 8–8–3 | 19 | Recap |
| 20 | November 23 | Florida | 1–4 | Carolina | | Reimer | 13,226 | 8–9–3 | 19 | Recap |
| 21 | November 24 | Chicago | 5–4 | Florida | OT | Reimer | 14,283 | 8–9–4 | 20 | Recap |
| 22 | November 26 | New Jersey | 3–4 | Florida | OT | Reimer | 9,456 | 9–9–4 | 22 | Recap |
| 23 | November 28 | Anaheim | 3–2 | Florida | | Reimer | 9,078 | 9–10–4 | 22 | Recap |
| 24 | November 30 | Buffalo | 2–3 | Florida | OT | Reimer | 12,179 | 10–10–4 | 24 | Recap |

December: 7–5–2 (Home: 3–2–2; Road: 4–3–0)
| # | Date | Visitor | Score | Home | OT | Decision | Attendance | Record | Pts | Recap |
|---|---|---|---|---|---|---|---|---|---|---|
| 25 | December 1 | Tampa Bay | 5–4 | Florida | OT | Reimer | 12,361 | 10–10–5 | 25 | Recap |
| 26 | December 4 | Boston | 0–5 | Florida | | Luongo | 12,058 | 11–10–5 | 27 | Recap |
| 27 | December 6 | Colorado | 5–2 | Florida | | Luongo | 10,077 | 11–11–5 | 27 | Recap |
| 28 | December 8 | NY Rangers | 5–4 | Florida | SO | Luongo | 15,295 | 11–11–6 | 28 | Recap |
| 29 | December 11 | Florida | 3–4 | St. Louis | | Luongo | 16,255 | 11–12–6 | 28 | Recap |
| 30 | December 13 | Florida | 1–5 | Minnesota | | Reimer | 18,714 | 11–13–6 | 28 | Recap |
| 31 | December 15 | Toronto | 3–4 | Florida | OT | Luongo | 14,177 | 12–13–6 | 30 | Recap |
| 32 | December 18 | Florida | 5–2 | Buffalo | | Luongo | 17,602 | 13–13–6 | 32 | Recap |
| 33 | December 20 | Florida | 1–6 | Toronto | | Luongo | 19,329 | 13–14–6 | 32 | Recap |
| 34 | December 22 | Florida | 2–1 | Detroit | | Luongo | 19,515 | 14–14–6 | 34 | Recap |
| 35 | December 23 | Florida | 6–3 | Chicago | | Reimer | 21,789 | 15–14–6 | 36 | Recap |
| 36 | December 28 | Montreal | 5–3 | Florida | | Luongo | 19,512 | 15–15–6 | 36 | Recap |
| 37 | December 29 | Philadelphia | 1–2 | Florida | | Reimer | 15,737 | 16–15–6 | 38 | Recap |
| 38 | December 31 | Florida | 4–3 | Detroit | SO | Reimer | 19,515 | 17–15–6 | 40 | Recap |

January: 3–5–2 (Home: 2–0–1; Road: 1–5–1)
| # | Date | Visitor | Score | Home | OT | Decision | Attendance | Record | Pts | Recap |
|---|---|---|---|---|---|---|---|---|---|---|
| 39 | January 3 | Florida | 3–4 | Buffalo | | Luongo | 18,551 | 17–16–6 | 40 | Recap |
| 40 | January 5 | Columbus | 4–3 | Florida | OT | Reimer | 15,213 | 17–16–7 | 41 | Recap |
| 41 | January 8 | Florida | 1–5 | Pittsburgh | | Luongo | 18,526 | 17–17–7 | 41 | Recap |
| 42 | January 10 | Florida | 3–4 | Edmonton | SO | Reimer | 18,347 | 17–17–8 | 42 | Recap |
| 43 | January 11 | Florida | 3–4 | Calgary | | Luongo | 18,579 | 17–18–8 | 42 | Recap |
| 44 | January 13 | Florida | 1–5 | Vancouver | | Luongo | 18,610 | 17–19–8 | 42 | Recap |
| 45 | January 15 | Florida | 1–5 | Montreal | | Reimer | 20,576 | 17–20–8 | 42 | Recap |
| 46 | January 18 | Toronto | 1–3 | Florida | | Luongo | 16,741 | 18–20–8 | 44 | Recap |
| 47 | January 19 | Florida | 4–2 | Nashville | | Reimer | 17,716 | 19–20–8 | 46 | Recap |
| 48 | January 21 | San Jose | 2–6 | Florida | | Luongo | 14,014 | 20–20–8 | 48 | Recap |

February: 8–5–2 (Home: 6–5–0; Road: 2–0–2)
| # | Date | Visitor | Score | Home | OT | Decision | Attendance | Record | Pts | Recap |
|---|---|---|---|---|---|---|---|---|---|---|
| 49 | February 1 | Nashville | 4–1 | Florida | | Luongo | 13,158 | 20–21–8 | 48 | Recap |
| 50 | February 2 | Vegas | 1–3 | Florida | | Reimer | 15,202 | 21–21–8 | 50 | Recap |
| 51 | February 5 | St. Louis | 3–2 | Florida | | Reimer | 10,243 | 21–22–8 | 50 | Recap |
| 52 | February 7 | Pittsburgh | 2–3 | Florida | OT | Luongo | 14,712 | 22–22–8 | 52 | Recap |
| 53 | February 9 | Florida | 5–4 | Washington | OT | Luongo | 18,506 | 23–22–8 | 54 | Recap |
| 54 | February 10 | Tampa Bay | 5–2 | Florida | | Reimer | 13,566 | 23–23–8 | 54 | Recap |
| 55 | February 12 | Dallas | 3–0 | Florida | | Luongo | 9,472 | 23–24–8 | 54 | Recap |
| 56 | February 14 | Calgary | 2–3 | Florida | SO | Reimer | 10,198 | 24–24–8 | 56 | Recap |
| 57 | February 17 | Montreal | 3–6 | Florida | | Reimer | 16,212 | 25–24–8 | 58 | Recap |
| 58 | February 19 | Buffalo | 2–4 | Florida | | Reimer | 10,340 | 26–24–8 | 60 | Recap |
| 59 | February 21 | Carolina | 4–3 | Florida | | Reimer | 10,750 | 26–25–8 | 60 | Recap |
| 60 | February 23 | Los Angeles | 1–6 | Florida | | Luongo | 14,290 | 27–25–8 | 62 | Recap |
| 61 | February 25 | Florida | 4–3 | Colorado | OT | Luongo | 14,338 | 28–25–8 | 64 | Recap |
| 62 | February 26 | Florida | 3–4 | Arizona | SO | Luongo | 11,912 | 28–25–9 | 65 | Recap |
| 63 | February 28 | Florida | 5–6 | Vegas | SO | Luongo | 18,281 | 28–25–10 | 66 | Recap |

March: 7–7–2 (Home: 3–2–1; Road: 4–5–1)
| # | Date | Visitor | Score | Home | OT | Decision | Attendance | Record | Pts | Recap |
|---|---|---|---|---|---|---|---|---|---|---|
| 64 | March 2 | Carolina | 4–3 | Florida | OT | Montembeault | 13,923 | 28–25–11 | 67 | Recap |
| 65 | March 3 | Ottawa | 3–2 | Florida | | Luongo | 11,752 | 28–26–11 | 67 | Recap |
| 66 | March 5 | Florida | 2–3 | Pittsburgh | OT | Luongo | 18,484 | 28–26–12 | 68 | Recap |
| 67 | March 7 | Florida | 3–4 | Boston | | Luongo | 17,565 | 28–27–12 | 68 | Recap |
| 68 | March 8 | Minnesota | 2–6 | Florida | | Montembeault | 12,388 | 29–27–12 | 70 | Recap |
| 69 | March 10 | Detroit | 1–6 | Florida | | Montembeault | 15,238 | 30–27–12 | 72 | Recap |
| 70 | March 14 | Florida | 4–2 | San Jose | | Montembeault | 17,388 | 31–27–12 | 74 | Recap |
| 71 | March 16 | Florida | 4–3 | Los Angeles | | Montembeault | 18,022 | 32–27–12 | 76 | Recap |
| 72 | March 17 | Florida | 2–3 | Anaheim | | Montembeault | 16,523 | 32–28–12 | 76 | Recap |
| 73 | March 19 | Florida | 2–4 | Dallas | | Montembeault | 17,654 | 32–29–12 | 76 | Recap |
| 74 | March 21 | Arizona | 2–4 | Florida | | Luongo | 12,576 | 33–29–12 | 78 | Recap |
| 75 | March 23 | Boston | 7–3 | Florida | | Montembeault | 17,129 | 33–30–12 | 78 | Recap |
| 76 | March 25 | Florida | 5–7 | Toronto | | Luongo | 19,125 | 33–31–12 | 78 | Recap |
| 77 | March 26 | Florida | 1–6 | Montreal | | Reimer | 21,029 | 33–32–12 | 78 | Recap |
| 78 | March 28 | Florida | 5–2 | Ottawa | | Luongo | 14,230 | 34–32–12 | 80 | Recap |
| 79 | March 30 | Florida | 4–1 | Boston | | Luongo | 17,565 | 35–32–12 | 82 | Recap |

April: 1–0–2 (Home: 1–0–2; Road: 0–0–0)
| # | Date | Visitor | Score | Home | OT | Decision | Attendance | Record | Pts | Recap |
|---|---|---|---|---|---|---|---|---|---|---|
| 80 | April 1 | Washington | 3–5 | Florida | | Luongo | 14,376 | 36–32–12 | 84 | Recap |
| 81 | April 4 | NY Islanders | 2–1 | Florida | SO | Montembeault | 13,775 | 36–32–13 | 85 | Recap |
| 82 | April 6 | New Jersey | 4–3 | Florida | OT | Luongo | 15,259 | 36–32–14 | 86 | Recap |

Legend: Win (2 points) Loss (0 points) Overtime/shootout loss (1 point)
Note:
^{a} Game was played at Hartwall Arena in Helsinki, Finland.

== Player statistics ==
As of April 6, 2019

=== Skaters ===
Regular season
| Player | GP | G | A | Pts | +/− | PIM |
|---|---|---|---|---|---|---|
| Aleksander Barkov | 82 | 35 | 61 | 96 | −3 | 8 |
| Jonathan Huberdeau | 82 | 30 | 62 | 92 | −14 | 40 |
| Mike Hoffman | 82 | 36 | 34 | 70 | −24 | 30 |
| Evgenii Dadonov | 82 | 28 | 42 | 70 | −6 | 8 |
| Keith Yandle | 82 | 9 | 53 | 62 | −17 | 50 |
| Frank Vatrano | 81 | 24 | 15 | 39 | −10 | 38 |
| Aaron Ekblad | 82 | 13 | 24 | 37 | 1 | 47 |
| Vincent Trocheck | 55 | 10 | 24 | 34 | −9 | 54 |
| Mike Matheson | 75 | 8 | 19 | 27 | −24 | 44 |
| Troy Brouwer | 75 | 12 | 9 | 21 | −6 | 47 |
| Jared McCann^{‡} | 46 | 8 | 10 | 18 | −9 | 18 |
| Henrik Borgstrom | 50 | 8 | 10 | 18 | −14 | 4 |
| Denis Malgin | 50 | 7 | 9 | 16 | −10 | 14 |
| Colton Sceviour | 59 | 5 | 10 | 15 | −2 | 15 |
| MacKenzie Weegar | 64 | 4 | 11 | 15 | −3 | 64 |
| Jayce Hawryluk | 42 | 7 | 5 | 12 | −8 | 16 |
| Nick Bjugstad^{‡} | 32 | 5 | 7 | 12 | 2 | 16 |
| Mark Pysyk | 70 | 1 | 10 | 11 | −1 | 26 |
| Dryden Hunt | 31 | 3 | 7 | 10 | 0 | 8 |
| Riley Sheahan^{†} | 33 | 2 | 8 | 10 | −2 | 4 |
| Bogdan Kiselevich^{‡} | 32 | 0 | 8 | 8 | −3 | 12 |
| Jamie McGinn | 19 | 4 | 3 | 7 | −5 | 6 |
| Juho Lammikko | 40 | 0 | 6 | 6 | −7 | 6 |
| Derick Brassard^{†‡} | 10 | 1 | 3 | 4 | −6 | 2 |
| Micheal Haley^{‡} | 24 | 1 | 2 | 3 | −2 | 30 |
| Ian McCoshen | 19 | 1 | 1 | 2 | −2 | 8 |
| Josh Brown | 37 | 1 | 1 | 2 | −3 | 28 |
| Jacob MacDonald | 2 | 1 | 0 | 1 | 1 | 0 |
| Alex Petrovic^{‡} | 26 | 0 | 1 | 1 | −8 | 24 |
| Chris Wideman^{†‡} | 1 | 0 | 0 | 0 | −1 | 2 |
| Maxim Mamin | 7 | 0 | 0 | 0 | −2 | 5 |
| Derek MacKenzie | 1 | 0 | 0 | 0 | 0 | 0 |
| Anthony Greco | 1 | 0 | 0 | 0 | −3 | 0 |
| Riley Stillman | 1 | 0 | 0 | 0 | 0 | 2 |
| Brady Keeper | 1 | 0 | 0 | 0 | 1 | 0 |

=== Goaltenders ===
Regular season
| Player | GP | GS | TOI | W | L | OT | GA | GAA | SA | SV% | SO | G | A | PIM |
|---|---|---|---|---|---|---|---|---|---|---|---|---|---|---|
| Roberto Luongo | 43 | 40 | 2,346:38 | 18 | 16 | 5 | 122 | 3.12 | 1,205 | .899 | 1 | 0 | 1 | 0 |
| James Reimer | 36 | 29 | 1,805:11 | 13 | 12 | 5 | 93 | 3.09 | 929 | .900 | 0 | 0 | 0 | 0 |
| Sam Montembeault | 11 | 10 | 591:24 | 4 | 3 | 2 | 30 | 3.04 | 282 | .894 | 0 | 0 | 1 | 0 |
| Michael Hutchinson^{‡} | 4 | 3 | 201:14 | 1 | 1 | 2 | 14 | 4.17 | 87 | .839 | 0 | 0 | 0 | 0 |

^{†}Denotes player spent time with another team before joining the Panthers. Stats reflect time with the Panthers only.
^{‡}Denotes player was traded mid-season. Stats reflect time with the Panthers only.
Bold/italics denotes franchise record.

== Transactions ==
The Panthers have been involved in the following transactions during the 2018–19 season.

=== Trades ===
| Date | Details | | Ref |
|---|---|---|---|
| June 23, 2018 | To Nashville Predators 3rd-round pick in 2019 | To Florida Panthers 3rd-round pick in 2018 | |
| December 29, 2018 | To Toronto Maple Leafs Michael Hutchinson | To Florida Panthers 5th-round pick in 2020 | |
| December 30, 2018 | To Edmonton Oilers Alex Petrovic | To Florida Panthers Chris Wideman; Conditional 3rd-round pick in 2019 | |
| February 1, 2019 | To Pittsburgh Penguins Nick Bjugstad; Jared McCann | To Florida Panthers Derick Brassard; Riley Sheahan; 2nd-round pick in 2019; 4th-round pick in 2019; MIN 4th-round pick in 2019 | |
| February 22, 2019 | To San Jose Sharks Future considerations | To Florida Panthers Vincent Praplan | |
| February 25, 2019 | To Carolina Hurricanes Future considerations | To Florida Panthers Cliff Pu | |
| February 25, 2019 | To Colorado Avalanche Derick Brassard; Conditional 6th-round pick in 2020 | To Florida Panthers 3rd-round pick in 2020 | |
| February 25, 2019 | To Pittsburgh Penguins Chris Wideman | To Florida Panthers Jean-Sebastien Dea | |
| February 25, 2019 | To Winnipeg Jets Bogdan Kiselevich | To Florida Panthers 7th-round pick in 2021 | |

=== Free agents ===
| Date | Player | Team | Contract term | Ref |
|---|---|---|---|---|
| July 1, 2018 | Connor Brickley | to Nashville Predators | 1-year | |
| July 1, 2018 | Alexandre Grenier | to Laval Rocket (AHL) | 1-year | |
| July 1, 2018 | Michael Hutchinson | from Winnipeg Jets | 1-year | |
| July 1, 2018 | Harri Sateri | to Detroit Red Wings | 1-year | |
| July 2, 2018 | Jacob MacDonald | from Binghamton Devils (AHL) | 2-year | |
| July 2, 2018 | Paul Thompson | from Vegas Golden Knights | 2-year | |
| July 3, 2018 | Curtis Valk | to Barys Astana (KHL) | 1-year | |
| July 3, 2018 | Ed Wittchow | to KooKoo (Liiga) | 1-year | |
| July 13, 2018 | Julian Melchiori | from Winnipeg Jets | 1-year | |
| August 27, 2018 | Troy Brouwer | from Calgary Flames | 1-year | |
| August 30, 2018 | Gregory Chase | to Wichita Thunder (ECHL) | 1-year | |
| February 24, 2019 | Chris Driedger | from Springfield Thunderbirds (AHL) | 1-year | |
| March 18, 2019 | Brady Keeper | from Maine Black Bears (Hockey East) | 2-year | |
| May 16, 2019 | Ludvig Bystrom | to Oulun Kärpät (Liiga) | 2-year | |
| May 17, 2019 | Henrik Haapala | to Jokerit (Liiga) | 2-year | |
| May 17, 2019 | Vincent Praplan | to SC Bern (NL) | 4-year | |
| May 28, 2019 | Rodrigo Abols | from Örebro HK (SHL) | 2-year | |

=== Waivers ===
| Date | Player | Team | Ref |
|---|---|---|---|
| February 20, 2019 | Micheal Haley | to San Jose Sharks | |

=== Contract terminations ===
| Date | Player | Via | Ref |

=== Retirement ===
| Date | Player | Ref |
|---|---|---|
| April 8, 2018 | Radim Vrbata | |

=== Signings ===
| Date | Player | Contract term | Ref |
|---|---|---|---|
| June 29, 2018 | Frank Vatrano | 1-year | |
| July 1, 2018 | Jared McCann | 2-year | |
| July 6, 2018 | Alex Petrovic | 1-year | |
| July 25, 2018 | MacKenzie Weegar | 1-year | |
| February 25, 2019 | Frank Vatrano | 3-year | |
| March 8, 2019 | Serron Noel | 3-year | |
| April 2, 2019 | Ryan Bednard | 2-year | |
| April 30, 2019 | Chris Driedger | 2-year | |
| May 15, 2019 | Aleksi Heponiemi | 3-year | |

== Draft picks ==
Below are the Florida Panthers' selections at the 2018 NHL entry draft, which was held on June 22 and 23, 2018, at the American Airlines Center in Dallas, Texas.

| Round | # | Player | Pos | Nationality | College/Junior/Club team (League) |
|---|---|---|---|---|---|
| 1 | 15 | Grigori Denisenko | LW | Russia | Loko Yaroslavl (MHL) |
| 2 | 34^{1} | Serron Noel | RW | Canada | Oshawa Generals (OHL) |
| 3 | 89^{2} | Logan Hutsko | RW | United States | Boston College (Hockey East) |
| 6 | 170 | Justin Schutz | LW | Germany | Red Bull Hockey Akademie (Czech U18) |
| 7 | 201 | Cole Krygier | D | United States | Lincoln Stars (USHL) |
| 7 | 207^{3} | Santtu Kinnunen | D | Finland | Pelicans U20 (Nuorten SM-liiga) |

Notes:

1. The Arizona Coyotes' second-round pick went to the Florida Panthers as the result of a trade on August 25, 2016, that sent Dave Bolland and Lawson Crouse to Arizona in exchange for a third-round pick in 2017 and this pick (being conditional at the time of the trade).
2. The Nashville Predators' third-round pick went to the Florida Panthers as the result of a trade on June 23, 2018, that sent a third-round pick in 2019 to Nashville in exchange for this pick.
3. The San Jose Sharks' seventh-round pick went to the Florida Panthers as the result of a trade on June 19, 2018, that sent Vegas' fourth-round pick in 2018, a fifth-round pick in 2018 and a second-round pick in 2019 to San Jose in exchange for Mike Hoffman and this pick.
