= 2018–19 Toronto Maple Leafs season =

NHL hockey team season

2018–19 Toronto Maple Leafs
- Division: 3rd Atlantic
- Conference: 5th Eastern
- 2018–19 record: 46–28–8
- Home record: 23–16–2
- Road record: 23–12–6
- Goals for: 286
- Goals against: 251

Team information
- General manager: Kyle Dubas
- Coach: Mike Babcock
- Captain: Vacant
- Alternate captains: Patrick Marleau; Morgan Rielly; John Tavares
- Arena: Scotiabank Arena
- Average attendance: 19,276
- Minor league affiliates: Toronto Marlies (AHL); Newfoundland Growlers (ECHL)

Team leaders
- Goals: John Tavares (47)
- Assists: Mitch Marner (68)
- Points: Mitch Marner (94)
- Penalty minutes: Zach Hyman (65)
- Plus/minus: Ron Hainsey (+30)
- Wins: Frederik Andersen (36)
- Goals against average: Frederik Andersen (2.77)

The 2018–19 Toronto Maple Leafs season was the 102nd season for the National Hockey League (NHL) franchise that was established on November 22, 1917. The Maple Leafs forward group changed significantly before the season, losing team veterans Tyler Bozak, James van Riemsdyk and Leo Komarov while adding all-star centre John Tavares in free agency, which many publications called one of the biggest signings in NHL history. On April 1, 2019, the Maple Leafs clinched a playoff spot for the third year in a row, after a 2–1 win over the New York Islanders.

The Maple Leafs faced the Boston Bruins in the first round of the playoffs for the second straight year, where they lost in seven games.

== Standings ==
Atlantic Division
Pos	Team	GP	W	L	OTL	ROW	GF	GA	GD	Pts
1	p – Tampa Bay Lightning	82	62	16	4	56	325	222	+103	128
2	x – Boston Bruins	82	49	24	9	47	259	215	+44	107
3	x – Toronto Maple Leafs	82	46	28	8	46	286	251	+35	100
4	Montreal Canadiens	82	44	30	8	41	249	236	+13	96
5	Florida Panthers	82	36	32	14	33	267	280	−13	86
6	Buffalo Sabres	82	33	39	10	28	226	271	−45	76
7	Detroit Red Wings	82	32	40	10	29	227	277	−50	74
8	Ottawa Senators	82	29	47	6	29	242	302	−60	64

Source: National Hockey League
p – Clinched Presidents' Trophy; x – Clinched playoff spot

== Schedule and results ==
=== Preseason ===
2018 preseason: 6–2–0 (Home: 3–1–0; Road: 3–1–0)

Game	Date	Opponent	Score	OT	Decision	Location	Attendance	Record	Recap
1	September 18	Ottawa Senators	4–1		McElhinney (1–0–0)	Lucan Community Memorial Centre	–	1–0–0	Recap
2	September 19	@ Ottawa Senators	4–1		Pickard (1–0–0)	Canadian Tire Centre	11,375	2–0–0	Recap
3	September 21	Buffalo Sabres	5–3		McElhinney (2–0–0)	Scotiabank Arena	18,833	3–0–0	Recap
4	September 22	@ Buffalo Sabres	3–2		Pickard (2–0–0)	KeyBank Center	17,624	4–0–0	Recap
5	September 24	Montreal Canadiens	1–5		Sparks (0–1–0)	Scotiabank Arena	18,843	4–1–0	Recap
6	September 26	@ Montreal Canadiens	5–3		Andersen (1–0–0)	Bell Centre	20,486	5–1–0	Recap
7	September 28	Detroit Red Wings	6–2		Andersen (2–0–0)	Scotiabank Arena	18,889	6–1–0	Recap
8	September 29	@ Detroit Red Wings	1–5		McElhinney (2–1–0)	Little Caesars Arena	18,753	6–2–0	Recap

=== Regular season ===
2018–19 game log: 46–28–8, 100 points (Home: 23–16–2; Road: 23–12–6)
October: 8–4–0, 16 points (Home: 3–4–0; Road: 5–0–0)

Game	Date	Opponent	Score	OT	Decision	Location	Attendance	Record	Points	Recap
1	October 3	Montreal Canadiens	3–2	OT	Andersen (1–0–0)	Scotiabank Arena	19,589	1–0–0	2	Recap
2	October 6	Ottawa Senators	3–5		Andersen (1–1–0)	Scotiabank Arena	19,321	1–1–0	2	Recap
3	October 7	@ Chicago Blackhawks	7–6	OT	Sparks (1–0–0)	United Center	21,812	2–1–0	4	Recap
4	October 9	@ Dallas Stars	7–4		Andersen (2–1–0)	American Airlines Center	17,866	3–1–0	6	Recap
5	October 11	@ Detroit Red Wings	5–3		Andersen (3–1–0)	Little Caesars Arena	19,515	4–1–0	8	Recap
6	October 13	@ Washington Capitals	4–2		Andersen (4–1–0)	Capital One Arena	18,506	5–1–0	10	Recap
7	October 15	Los Angeles Kings	4–1		Sparks (2–0–0)	Scotiabank Arena	19,429	6–1–0	12	Recap
8	October 18	Pittsburgh Penguins	0–3		Andersen (4–2–0)	Scotiabank Arena	19,483	6–2–0	12	Recap
9	October 20	St. Louis Blues	1–4		Andersen (4–3–0)	Scotiabank Arena	19,268	6–3–0	12	Recap
10	October 24	@ Winnipeg Jets	4–2		Andersen (5–3–0)	Bell MTS Place	15,321	7–3–0	14	Recap
11	October 27	Winnipeg Jets	3–2		Andersen (6–3–0)	Scotiabank Arena	19,545	8–3–0	16	Recap
12	October 29	Calgary Flames	1–3		Andersen (6–4–0)	Scotiabank Arena	18,989	8–4–0	16	Recap

November: 10–4–0, 20 points (Home: 6–1–0; Road: 4–3–0)

Game	Date	Opponent	Score	OT	Decision	Location	Attendance	Record	Points	Recap
13	November 1	Dallas Stars	1–2		Andersen (6–5–0)	Scotiabank Arena	18,878	8–5–0	16	Recap
14	November 3	@ Pittsburgh Penguins	5–0		Andersen (7–5–0)	PPG Paints Arena	18,638	9–5–0	18	Recap
15	November 6	Vegas Golden Knights	3–1		Andersen (8–5–0)	Scotiabank Arena	19,045	10–5–0	20	Recap
16	November 9	New Jersey Devils	6–1		Andersen (9–5–0)	Scotiabank Arena	19,211	11–5–0	22	Recap
17	November 10	@ Boston Bruins	1–5		Sparks (2–1–0)	TD Garden	17,565	11–6–0	22	Recap
18	November 13	@ Los Angeles Kings	5–1		Andersen (10–5–0)	Staples Center	17,859	12–6–0	24	Recap
19	November 15	@ San Jose Sharks	5–3		Andersen (11–5–0)	SAP Center	17,011	13–6–0	26	Recap
20	November 16	@ Anaheim Ducks	2–1	OT	Sparks (3–1–0)	Honda Center	16,666	14–6–0	28	Recap
21	November 19	Columbus Blue Jackets	4–2		Andersen (12–5–0)	Scotiabank Arena	19,134	15–6–0	30	Recap
22	November 21	@ Carolina Hurricanes	2–5		Andersen (12–6–0)	PNC Arena	12,562	15–7–0	30	Recap
23	November 23	@ Columbus Blue Jackets	2–4		Andersen (12–7–0)	Nationwide Arena	18,656	15–8–0	30	Recap
24	November 24	Philadelphia Flyers	6–0		Sparks (4–1–0)	Scotiabank Arena	19,373	16–8–0	32	Recap
25	November 26	Boston Bruins	4–2		Andersen (13–7–0)	Scotiabank Arena	19,286	17–8–0	34	Recap
26	November 28	San Jose Sharks	5–3		Andersen (14–7–0)	Scotiabank Arena	19,362	18–8–0	36	Recap

December: 8–3–2, 18 points (Home: 3–1–1; Road: 5–2–1)

Game	Date	Opponent	Score	OT	Decision	Location	Attendance	Record	Points	Recap
27	December 1	@ Minnesota Wild	5–3		Andersen (15–7–0)	Xcel Energy Center	19,107	19–8–0	38	Recap
28	December 4	@ Buffalo Sabres	4–3	OT	Andersen (16–7–0)	KeyBank Center	19,070	20–8–0	40	Recap
29	December 6	Detroit Red Wings	4–5	OT	Sparks (4–1–1)	Scotiabank Arena	19,392	20–8–1	41	Recap
30	December 8	@ Boston Bruins	3–6		Andersen (16–8–0)	TD Garden	17,565	20–9–1	41	Recap
31	December 11	@ Carolina Hurricanes	4–1		Andersen (17–8–0)	PNC Arena	11,907	21–9–1	43	Recap
32	December 13	@ Tampa Bay Lightning	1–4		Andersen (17–9–0)	Amalie Arena	19,092	21–10–1	43	Recap
33	December 15	@ Florida Panthers	3–4	OT	Andersen (17–9–1)	BB&T Center	14,177	21–10–2	44	Recap
34	December 18	@ New Jersey Devils	7–2		Andersen (18–9–1)	Prudential Center	14,586	22–10–2	46	Recap
35	December 20	Florida Panthers	6–1		Andersen (19–9–1)	Scotiabank Arena	19,329	23–10–2	48	Recap
36	December 22	New York Rangers	5–3		Andersen (20–9–1)	Scotiabank Arena	19,466	24–10–2	50	Recap
37	December 23	Detroit Red Wings	5–4	OT	Sparks (5–1–1)	Scotiabank Arena	19,196	25–10–2	52	Recap
38	December 28	@ Columbus Blue Jackets	4–2		Sparks (6–1–1)	Nationwide Arena	18,963	26–10–2	54	Recap
39	December 29	New York Islanders	0–4		Sparks (6–2–1)	Scotiabank Arena	19,514	26–11–2	54	Recap

January: 4–6–0, 8 points (Home: 2–5–0; Road: 2–1–0)

Game	Date	Opponent	Score	OT	Decision	Location	Attendance	Record	Points	Recap
40	January 3	Minnesota Wild	3–4		Hutchinson (0–1–0)	Scotiabank Arena	19,244	26–12–2	54	Recap
41	January 5	Vancouver Canucks	5–0		Hutchinson (1–1–0)	Scotiabank Arena	19,388	27–12–2	56	Recap
42	January 7	Nashville Predators	0–4		Hutchinson (1–2–0)	Scotiabank Arena	19,059	27–13–2	56	Recap
43	January 10	@ New Jersey Devils	4–2		Hutchinson (2–2–0)	Prudential Center	15,280	28–13–2	58	Recap
44	January 12	Boston Bruins	2–3		Hutchinson (2–3–0)	Scotiabank Arena	19,305	28–14–2	58	Recap
45	January 14	Colorado Avalanche	3–6		Andersen (20–10–1)	Scotiabank Arena	19,248	28–15–2	58	Recap
46	January 17	@ Tampa Bay Lightning	4–2		Andersen (21–10–1)	Amalie Arena	19,092	29–15–2	60	Recap
47	January 18	@ Florida Panthers	1–3		Sparks (6–3–1)	BB&T Center	16,741	29–16–2	60	Recap
48	January 20	Arizona Coyotes	2–4		Andersen (21–11–1)	Scotiabank Arena	19,165	29–17–2	60	Recap
49	January 23	Washington Capitals	6–3		Andersen (22–11–1)	Scotiabank Arena	19,148	30–17–2	62	Recap

February: 9–4–2, 20 points (Home: 6–1–0; Road: 3–3–2)

Game	Date	Opponent	Score	OT	Decision	Location	Attendance	Record	Points	Recap
50	February 1	@ Detroit Red Wings	2–3	OT	Andersen (22–11–2)	Little Caesars Arena	19,515	30–17–3	63	Recap
51	February 2	Pittsburgh Penguins	3–2		Sparks (7–3–1)	Scotiabank Arena	19,477	31–17–3	65	Recap
52	February 4	Anaheim Ducks	6–1		Andersen (23–11–2)	Scotiabank Arena	18,858	32–17–3	67	Recap
53	February 6	Ottawa Senators	5–4		Andersen (24–11–2)	Scotiabank Arena	19,264	33–17–3	69	Recap
54	February 9	@ Montreal Canadiens	4–3	OT	Andersen (25–11–2)	Bell Centre	21,302	34–17–3	71	Recap
55	February 10	@ New York Rangers	1–4		Sparks (7–4–1)	Madison Square Garden	17,445	34–18–3	71	Recap
56	February 12	@ Colorado Avalanche	5–2		Andersen (26–11–2)	Pepsi Center	16,426	35–18–3	73	Recap
57	February 14	@ Vegas Golden Knights	6–3		Andersen (27–11–2)	T-Mobile Arena	18,214	36–18–3	75	Recap
58	February 16	@ Arizona Coyotes	0–2		Andersen (27–12–2)	Gila River Arena	17,125	36–19–3	75	Recap
59	February 19	@ St. Louis Blues	2–3	OT	Andersen (27–12–3)	Enterprise Center	18,598	36–19–4	76	Recap
60	February 21	Washington Capitals	2–3		Andersen (27–13–3)	Scotiabank Arena	19,378	36–20–4	76	Recap
61	February 23	Montreal Canadiens	6–3		Andersen (28–13–3)	Scotiabank Arena	19,506	37–20–4	78	Recap
62	February 25	Buffalo Sabres	5–3		Andersen (29–13–3)	Scotiabank Arena	19,026	38–20–4	80	Recap
63	February 27	Edmonton Oilers	6–2		Andersen (30–13–3)	Scotiabank Arena	19,356	39–20–4	82	Recap
64	February 28	@ New York Islanders	1–6		Sparks (7–5–1)	Nassau Coliseum	13,917	39–21–4	82	Recap

March: 6–5–3, 15 points (Home: 3–2–1; Road: 3–3–2)

Game	Date	Opponent	Score	OT	Decision	Location	Attendance	Record	Points	Recap
65	March 2	Buffalo Sabres	5–2		Andersen (31–13–3)	Scotiabank Arena	19,088	40–21–4	84	Recap
66	March 4	@ Calgary Flames	6–2		Andersen (32–13–3)	Scotiabank Saddledome	19,289	41–21–4	86	Recap
67	March 6	@ Vancouver Canucks	2–3	OT	Andersen (32–13–4)	Rogers Arena	18,871	41–21–5	87	Recap
68	March 9	@ Edmonton Oilers	3–2		Andersen (33–13–4)	Rogers Place	18,347	42–21–5	89	Recap
69	March 11	Tampa Bay Lightning	2–6		Andersen (33–14–4)	Scotiabank Arena	19,491	42–22–5	89	Recap
70	March 13	Chicago Blackhawks	4–5		Sparks (7–6–1)	Scotiabank Arena	19,342	42–23–5	89	Recap
71	March 15	Philadelphia Flyers	7–6		Andersen (34–14–4)	Scotiabank Arena	19,290	43–23–5	91	Recap
72	March 16	@ Ottawa Senators	2–6		Sparks (7–7–1)	Canadian Tire Centre	18,607	43–24–5	91	Recap
73	March 19	@ Nashville Predators	0–3		Andersen (34–15–4)	Bridgestone Arena	17,499	43–25–5	91	Recap
74	March 20	@ Buffalo Sabres	4–2		Sparks (8–7–1)	KeyBank Center	19,070	44–25–5	93	Recap
75	March 23	New York Rangers	1–2	OT	Andersen (34–15–5)	Scotiabank Arena	19,251	44–25–6	94	Recap
76	March 25	Florida Panthers	7–5		Andersen (35–15–5)	Scotiabank Arena	19,125	45–25–6	96	Recap
77	March 27	@ Philadelphia Flyers	4–5	SO	Andersen (35–15–6)	Wells Fargo Center	19,205	45–25–7	97	Recap
78	March 30	@ Ottawa Senators	2–4		Sparks (8–8–1)	Canadian Tire Centre	18,655	45–26–7	97	Recap

April: 1–2–1, 3 points (Home: 0–2–0; Road: 1–0–1)

Game	Date	Opponent	Score	OT	Decision	Location	Attendance	Record	Points	Recap
79	April 1	@ New York Islanders	2–1		Andersen (36–15–6)	Nassau Coliseum	13,917	46–26–7	99	Recap
80	April 2	Carolina Hurricanes	1–4		Sparks (8–9–1)	Scotiabank Arena	19,097	46–27–7	99	Recap
81	April 4	Tampa Bay Lightning	1–3		Andersen (36–16–6)	Scotiabank Arena	19,400	46–28–7	99	Recap
82	April 6	@ Montreal Canadiens	5–6	SO	Andersen (36–16–7)	Bell Centre	21,302	46–28–8	100	Recap

2018–19 schedule

Win (2 Points) Loss (0 points) Overtime/shootout loss (1 point)

=== Playoffs ===
The Maple Leafs faced the Boston Bruins in the first round of the playoffs, and were defeated in seven games. They played against each other in the 2018 Stanley Cup playoffs, where the Maple Leafs lost to the Bruins in the first round in seven games.

2019 Stanley Cup playoffs
Eastern Conference First Round vs. (A2) Boston Bruins: Boston won 4–3

Game	Date	Opponent	Score	OT	Decision	Location	Attendance	Series	Recap
1	April 11	@ Boston Bruins	4–1		Andersen (1–0)	TD Garden	17,565	1–0	Recap
2	April 13	@ Boston Bruins	1–4		Andersen (1–1)	TD Garden	17,565	1–1	Recap
3	April 15	Boston Bruins	3–2		Andersen (2–1)	Scotiabank Arena	19,611	2–1	Recap
4	April 17	Boston Bruins	4–6		Andersen (2–2)	Scotiabank Arena	19,638	2–2	Recap
5	April 19	@ Boston Bruins	2–1		Andersen (3–2)	TD Garden	17,565	3–2	Recap
6	April 21	Boston Bruins	2–4		Andersen (3–3)	Scotiabank Arena	19,683	3–3	Recap
7	April 23	@ Boston Bruins	1–5		Andersen (3–4)	TD Garden	17,565	3–4	Recap

Win Loss

== Player statistics ==
Final

=== Skaters ===
Regular season
Player	GP	G	A	Pts	+/−	PIM
Mitch Marner	82	26	68	94	22	22
John Tavares	82	47	41	88	19	34
Auston Matthews	68	37	36	73	−9	12
Morgan Rielly	82	20	52	72	24	14
Kasperi Kapanen	78	20	24	44	12	27
Nazem Kadri	73	16	28	44	−2	43
Andreas Johnsson	73	20	23	43	14	32
Zach Hyman	71	21	20	41	16	65
Patrick Marleau	82	16	21	37	−6	28
Jake Gardiner	62	3	27	30	19	26
Connor Brown	82	8	21	29	11	16
William Nylander	54	7	20	27	−4	16
Ron Hainsey	81	5	18	23	30	21
Tyler Ennis	51	12	6	18	−6	2
Travis Dermott	64	4	13	17	−5	22
Jake Muzzin^{(c)}	30	5	11	16	11	14
Frederik Gauthier	70	3	11	14	3	12
Nikita Zaitsev	81	3	11	14	2	18
Par Lindholm^{(b)}	61	1	11	12	5	18
Trevor Moore	25	2	6	8	1	2
Igor Ozhiganov	53	3	4	7	0	14
Josh Leivo^{(b)}	27	4	2	6	1	7
Martin Marincin	24	1	4	5	−4	12
Calle Rosen	4	1	0	1	−3	0
Nic Petan^{(c)}	5	1	0	1	−3	0
Justin Holl	11	0	1	1	−5	2

Playoffs
Player	GP	G	A	Pts	+/−	PIM
Auston Matthews	7	5	1	6	−3	2
John Tavares	7	2	3	5	−5	0
Morgan Rielly	7	1	4	5	0	0
Mitch Marner	7	2	2	4	−4	2
Andreas Johnsson	7	1	3	4	−4	0
Travis Dermott	7	1	2	3	0	2
William Nylander	7	1	2	3	1	2
Nazem Kadri	2	1	1	2	1	19
Kasperi Kapanen	7	1	1	2	−1	2
Tyler Ennis	5	0	2	2	1	2
Jake Muzzin^{(c)}	7	0	2	2	−6	2
Jake Gardiner	7	0	2	2	−2	0
Patrick Marleau	7	0	2	2	1	2
Zach Hyman	7	1	0	1	−3	2
Trevor Moore	7	1	0	1	1	0
Ron Hainsey	7	0	1	1	5	2
Connor Brown	7	0	1	1	2	2
Frederik Gauthier	7	0	0	0	1	2
Nikita Zaitsev	7	0	0	0	−3	2

=== Goaltenders ===
Regular season
Player	GP	GS	TOI	W	L	OT	GA	GAA	SA	SV%	SO	G	A	PIM
Frederik Andersen	60	60	3,511	36	16	7	162	2.77	1958	.917	1	0	1	2
Garret Sparks	20	17	1,105	8	9	1	58	3.15	592	.902	1	0	0	0
Michael Hutchinson^{(c)}	5	5	295	2	3	0	13	2.64	152	.914	1	0	0	0

Playoffs
Player	GP	GS	TOI	W	L	GA	GAA	SA	SV%	SO	G	A	PIM
Frederik Andersen	7	7	413:49	3	4	19	2.75	244	.922	0	0	0	0

^{(a)} Player currently playing for the minor league affiliate Toronto Marlies of the AHL
^{(b)} Player is no longer with the Maple Leafs organization
^{(c)} Player previously played with another team before being acquired by Toronto
Bold/italics denotes franchise record.

== Transactions ==
The Maple Leafs have been involved in the following transactions during the 2018–19 season.

=== Trades ===
Date	Details		Ref
June 22, 2018	To St. Louis Blues 1st-round pick in 2018	To Toronto Maple Leafs WPG's 1st-round pick in 2018; 3rd-round pick in 2018	
June 23, 2018	To Buffalo Sabres 6th-round pick in 2019	To Toronto Maple Leafs 6th-round pick in 2018	
July 3, 2018	To New York Islanders Matt Martin	To Toronto Maple Leafs Eamon McAdam	
October 1, 2018	To Dallas Stars Connor Carrick	To Toronto Maple Leafs Conditional 7th-round pick in 2019	
November 27, 2018	To Calgary Flames Andrew Nielsen	To Toronto Maple Leafs Morgan Klimchuk	
December 3, 2018	To Vancouver Canucks Josh Leivo	To Toronto Maple Leafs Michael Carcone	
December 10, 2018	To Anaheim Ducks Adam Cracknell	To Toronto Maple Leafs Steven Oleksy	
December 29, 2018	To Florida Panthers 5th-round pick in 2020	To Toronto Maple Leafs Michael Hutchinson	
January 11, 2019	To Ottawa Senators Morgan Klimchuk	To Toronto Maple Leafs Gabriel Gagne	
January 28, 2019	To Los Angeles Kings Sean Durzi; Carl Grundstrom; 1st-round pick in 2019	To Toronto Maple Leafs Jake Muzzin	
February 24, 2019	To Nashville Predators Future considerations	To Toronto Maple Leafs Nicholas Baptiste	
February 25, 2019	To Winnipeg Jets Par Lindholm	To Toronto Maple Leafs Nic Petan	
May 30, 2019	To Minnesota Wild Fedor Gordeev	To Toronto Maple Leafs Conditional 7th-round pick in 2020	

=== Free agents ===
Date	Player	Team	Contract term	Ref
July 1, 2018	Miro Aaltonen	to Vityaz Podolsk (KHL)	Unknown	
July 1, 2018	Tyler Bozak	to St. Louis Blues	3-year	
July 1, 2018	Adam Cracknell	from Montreal Canadiens	1-year	
July 1, 2018	Josh Jooris	from Pittsburgh Penguins	1-year	
July 1, 2018	Leo Komarov	to New York Islanders	4-year	
July 1, 2018	Tomas Plekanec	to Montreal Canadiens	1-year	
July 1, 2018	Roman Polak	to Dallas Stars	1-year	
July 1, 2018	Jordan Subban	from Los Angeles Kings	1-year	
July 1, 2018	John Tavares	from New York Islanders	7-year	
July 1, 2018	James van Riemsdyk	to Philadelphia Flyers	5-year	
July 6, 2018	Tyler Ennis	from Minnesota Wild	1-year	
August 1, 2018	Kyle Baun	to Belfast Giants (EIHL)	1-year	
August 21, 2018	Martins Dzierkals	to Dinamo Riga (KHL)	Unknown	
March 13, 2019	Joseph Duszak	from Mercyhurst Lakers (AHA)	2-year	
May 6, 2019	Ilya Mikheyev	from Avangard Omsk (KHL)	1-year	
May 7, 2019	Teemu Kivihalme	from Oulun Kärpät (Liiga)	1-year	
May 17, 2019	Igor Ozhiganov	to Ak Bars Kazan (KHL)	2-year	
June 7, 2019	Josh Jooris	to Lausanne (NL)	3-year	

=== Waivers ===
Date	Player	Team	Ref
October 2, 2018	Curtis McElhinney	to Carolina Hurricanes	
October 2, 2018	Calvin Pickard	to Philadelphia Flyers	

=== Signings ===
Date	Player	Contract term	Ref
July 1, 2018	Martin Marincin	1-year	
July 3, 2018	Justin Holl	2-year	
July 11, 2018	Frederik Gauthier	2-year	
July 13, 2018	Andreas Johnsson	1-year	
July 15, 2018	Rasmus Sandin	3-year	
September 21, 2018	Semyon Der-Arguchintsev	3-year	
December 1, 2018	William Nylander	6-year	
December 10, 2018	Calle Rosen	2-year	
December 14, 2018	Ian Scott	3-year	
January 13, 2019	Trevor Moore	2-year	
February 5, 2019	Auston Matthews	5-year	
March 5, 2019	Garret Sparks	1-year	
March 6, 2019	Andreas Borgman	1-year	
March 7, 2019	Mac Hollowell	3-year	
March 13, 2019	Joseph Duszak	2-year	
March 21, 2019	Nic Petan	2-year	
March 24, 2019	Joseph Woll	3-year	
May 1, 2019	Yegor Korshkov	2-year	

== Draft picks ==
Below are the Toronto Maple Leafs' selections at the 2018 NHL entry draft, which was held on June 22 and 23, 2018, at the American Airlines Center in Dallas, Texas. The Leafs drafted a total of nine players. They held on to only three (rounds 4, 5, 7) of their own seven picks. On the first day of the draft they exchanged their first-round pick for a lower first-round pick held by the St. Louis Blues but did receive the Blues' third-round pick as well, their second round pick had been traded to the Montreal Canadiens in the Tomas Plekanec deal in February 2018, their third-round pick was given to the New Jersey Devils as compensation for signing general manager Lou Lamoriello in 2015, and their sixth-round pick had been traded to the Vegas Golden Knights in the Calvin Pickard deal in October 2017. Through various trades they acquired an additional six picks, including the first-round pick originally held by St. Louis mentioned above.

Round	#	Player	Pos	Nationality	College/Junior/Club team (League)
1	29^{1}	Rasmus Sandin	D	Sweden	Sault Ste. Marie Greyhounds (OHL)
2	52^{2}	Sean Durzi	D	Canada	Owen Sound Attack (OHL)
3	76^{3}	Semyon Der-Arguchintsev	C	Russia	Peterborough Petes (OHL)
3	83^{4}	Riley Stotts	C	Canada	Calgary Hitmen (WHL)
4	118	Mac Hollowell	D	Canada	Sault Ste. Marie Greyhounds (OHL)
5	149	Filip Kral	D	Czech Republic	Spokane Chiefs (WHL)
6	156^{5}	Pontus Holmberg	RW	Sweden	VIK Västerås HK (Hockeyettan)
7	209^{6}	Zachary Bouthillier	G	Canada	Chicoutimi Saguenéens (QMJHL)
7	211	Semyon Kizimov	RW	Russia	Ladia Togliatti (MHL)

=== Notes ===
1. The Winnipeg Jets' first-round pick went to the Toronto Maple Leafs as the result of a trade on June 22, 2018, that sent a first-round pick in 2018 (25th overall) to St. Louis in exchange for a third-round pick in 2018 (76th overall) and this pick.
2. The San Jose Sharks' second-round pick went to the Toronto Maple Leafs as the result of a trade on February 22, 2016, that sent Roman Polak and Nick Spaling to San Jose in exchange for Raffi Torres, a second-round pick in 2017 and this pick.
3. The St. Louis Blues' third-round pick went the Toronto Maple Leafs as the result of a trade on June 22, 2018, that sent a first-round pick in 2018 (25th overall) to St. Louis in exchange for Winnipeg's first-round pick in 2018 (29th overall) and this pick.
4. The San Jose Sharks' third-round pick went to the Toronto Maple Leafs as the result of a trade on February 27, 2016, that sent James Reimer and Jeremy Morin to San Jose in exchange for Alex Stalock, Ben Smith and this pick (being conditional at the time of the trade).
5. The Buffalo Sabres' sixth-round pick went to the Toronto Maple Leafs as the result of a trade on June 23, 2018, that sent Toronto's sixth-round pick in 2019 to Buffalo in exchange for this pick.
6. The Anaheim Ducks' seventh-round pick went to the Toronto Maple Leafs as the result of a trade January 10, 2017, that sent Jhonas Enroth to Anaheim in exchange for this pick.
