= 2018–19 New Jersey Devils season =

National Hockey League season

2018–19 New Jersey Devils
- Division: 8th Metropolitan
- Conference: 15th Eastern
- 2018–19 record: 31–41–10
- Home record: 20–14–7
- Road record: 11–27–3
- Goals for: 222
- Goals against: 275

Team information
- General manager: Ray Shero
- Coach: John Hynes
- Captain: Andy Greene
- Alternate captains: Taylor Hall; Kyle Palmieri; Travis Zajac
- Arena: Prudential Center
- Average attendance: 14,834
- Minor league affiliates: Binghamton Devils (AHL); Adirondack Thunder (ECHL)

Team leaders
- Goals: Kyle Palmieri (27)
- Assists: Nico Hischier (30)
- Points: Kyle Palmieri (50)
- Penalty minutes: Miles Wood (91)
- Plus/minus: Ben Lovejoy (+1)
- Wins: Keith Kinkaid (15)
- Goals against average: Mackenzie Blackwood (2.61)

The 2018–19 New Jersey Devils season was the 45th season for the National Hockey League (NHL) franchise that was established on June 11, 1974, and 37th season since the franchise relocated from Colorado prior to the 1982–83 NHL season. The Devils were eliminated from playoff contention on March 15, 2019, despite defeating the Vancouver Canucks. After missing the playoffs, the Devils received the first overall selection in the 2019 NHL entry draft, which was the second time in three years for the team, and selected Jack Hughes.

== Standings ==
=== Divisional standings ===
Metropolitan Division
| Pos | Team | GP | W | L | OTL | ROW | GF | GA | GD | Pts |
|---|---|---|---|---|---|---|---|---|---|---|
| 1 | y – Washington Capitals | 82 | 48 | 26 | 8 | 44 | 278 | 249 | +29 | 104 |
| 2 | x – New York Islanders | 82 | 48 | 27 | 7 | 43 | 228 | 196 | +32 | 103 |
| 3 | x – Pittsburgh Penguins | 82 | 44 | 26 | 12 | 42 | 273 | 241 | +32 | 100 |
| 4 | x – Carolina Hurricanes | 82 | 46 | 29 | 7 | 44 | 245 | 223 | +22 | 99 |
| 5 | x – Columbus Blue Jackets | 82 | 47 | 31 | 4 | 45 | 258 | 232 | +26 | 98 |
| 6 | Philadelphia Flyers | 82 | 37 | 37 | 8 | 34 | 244 | 281 | −37 | 82 |
| 7 | New York Rangers | 82 | 32 | 36 | 14 | 26 | 227 | 272 | −45 | 78 |
| 8 | New Jersey Devils | 82 | 31 | 41 | 10 | 28 | 222 | 275 | −53 | 72 |

Source: National Hockey League
x – Clinched playoff spot; y – Clinched division

=== Conference standings ===
Eastern Conference Wild Card
| Pos | Div | Team | GP | W | L | OTL | ROW | GF | GA | GD | Pts |
|---|---|---|---|---|---|---|---|---|---|---|---|
| 1 | ME | x – Carolina Hurricanes | 82 | 46 | 29 | 7 | 44 | 245 | 223 | +22 | 99 |
| 2 | ME | x – Columbus Blue Jackets | 82 | 47 | 31 | 4 | 45 | 258 | 232 | +26 | 98 |
| 3 | AT | Montreal Canadiens | 82 | 44 | 30 | 8 | 41 | 249 | 236 | +13 | 96 |
| 4 | AT | Florida Panthers | 82 | 36 | 32 | 14 | 33 | 267 | 280 | −13 | 86 |
| 5 | ME | Philadelphia Flyers | 82 | 37 | 37 | 8 | 34 | 244 | 281 | −37 | 82 |
| 6 | ME | New York Rangers | 82 | 32 | 36 | 14 | 26 | 227 | 272 | −45 | 78 |
| 7 | AT | Buffalo Sabres | 82 | 33 | 39 | 10 | 28 | 226 | 271 | −45 | 76 |
| 8 | AT | Detroit Red Wings | 82 | 32 | 40 | 10 | 29 | 227 | 277 | −50 | 74 |
| 9 | ME | New Jersey Devils | 82 | 31 | 41 | 10 | 28 | 222 | 275 | −53 | 72 |
| 10 | AT | Ottawa Senators | 82 | 29 | 47 | 6 | 29 | 242 | 302 | −60 | 64 |

Source: National Hockey League
x – Clinched playoff spot

== Schedule and results ==
=== Preseason ===
The preseason schedule was published on June 19, 2018.

2018 preseason game log: 2–2–2 (Home: 0–0–1; Road: 2–2–1)
| # | Date | Visitor | Score | Home | OT | Decision | Attendance | Record | Recap |
|---|---|---|---|---|---|---|---|---|---|
| 1^{[A]} | September 17 | NY Rangers | 4–3 | New Jersey | OT | Johnson | 11,386 | 0–0–1 | Recap |
| 2^{[A]} | September 17 | New Jersey | 1–3 | Montreal | | Blackwood | 19,422 | 0–1–1 | Recap |
| 3 | September 20 | New Jersey | 0–2 | NY Islanders | | Kinkaid | 4,722 | 0–2–1 | Recap |
| 4 | September 24 | New Jersey | 3–4 | NY Rangers | OT | Läck | 12,737 | 0–2–2 | Recap |
| 5 | September 27 | New Jersey | 5–3 | Winnipeg | | Kinkaid | 15,321 | 1–2–2 | Recap |
| 6^{[a]} | October 1 | New Jersey | 3–2 | SC Bern | OT | Kinkaid | 17,031 | 2–2–2 | Recap |
Notes:^{A} Indicates split-squad.^{a} Game was played at PostFinance Arena in Bern, Switzerland.

=== Regular season ===
The regular season schedule was released on June 21, 2018.

2018–19 game log

October: 5–3–1 (Home: 5–1–1; Road: 0–2–0)
| # | Date | Visitor | Score | Home | OT | Decision | Attendance | Record | Pts | Recap |
|---|---|---|---|---|---|---|---|---|---|---|
| 1^{[a]} | October 6 | Edmonton | 2–5 | New Jersey | | Kinkaid | 12,044 | 1–0–0 | 2 | Recap |
| 2 | October 11 | Washington | 0–6 | New Jersey | | Kinkaid | 16,514 | 2–0–0 | 4 | Recap |
| 3 | October 14 | San Jose | 2–3 | New Jersey | | Kinkaid | 13,809 | 3–0–0 | 6 | Recap |
| 4 | October 16 | Dallas | 0–3 | New Jersey | | Kinkaid | 12,808 | 4–0–0 | 8 | Recap |
| 5 | October 18 | Colorado | 5–3 | New Jersey | | Kinkaid | 13,374 | 4–1–0 | 8 | Recap |
| 6 | October 20 | New Jersey | 2–5 | Philadelphia | | Kinkaid | 19,105 | 4–2–0 | 8 | Recap |
| 7 | October 25 | Nashville | 4–3 | New Jersey | OT | Kinkaid | 15,164 | 4–2–1 | 9 | Recap |
| 8 | October 27 | Florida | 2–3 | New Jersey | | Kinkaid | 15,927 | 5–2–1 | 11 | Recap |
| 9 | October 30 | New Jersey | 3–8 | Tampa Bay | | Kinkaid | 19,092 | 5–3–1 | 11 | Recap |

November: 4–8–3 (Home: 2–0–2; Road: 2–8–1)
| # | Date | Visitor | Score | Home | OT | Decision | Attendance | Record | Pts | Recap |
|---|---|---|---|---|---|---|---|---|---|---|
| 10 | November 1 | New Jersey | 3–4 | Detroit | | Schneider | 18,273 | 5–4–1 | 11 | Recap |
| 11 | November 3 | New Jersey | 0–3 | NY Islanders | | Kinkaid | 11,901 | 5–5–1 | 11 | Recap |
| 12 | November 5 | New Jersey | 5–1 | Pittsburgh | | Kinkaid | 18,420 | 6–5–1 | 13 | Recap |
| 13 | November 6 | New Jersey | 3–7 | Ottawa | | Schneider | 12,491 | 6–6–1 | 13 | Recap |
| 14 | November 9 | New Jersey | 1–6 | Toronto | | Kinkaid | 19,211 | 6–7–1 | 13 | Recap |
| 15 | November 11 | New Jersey | 2–5 | Winnipeg | | Schneider | 15,321 | 6–8–1 | 13 | Recap |
| 16 | November 13 | Pittsburgh | 2–4 | New Jersey | | Kinkaid | 15,108 | 7–8–1 | 15 | Recap |
| 17 | November 15 | New Jersey | 3–0 | Philadelphia | | Kinkaid | 18,806 | 8–8–1 | 17 | Recap |
| 18 | November 17 | Detroit | 3–2 | New Jersey | OT | Kinkaid | 16,514 | 8–8–2 | 18 | Recap |
| 19 | November 18 | New Jersey | 1–2 | Carolina | | Schneider | 11,211 | 8–9–2 | 18 | Recap |
| 20 | November 21 | Montreal | 2–5 | New Jersey | | Kinkaid | 16,514 | 9–9–2 | 20 | Recap |
| 21 | November 23 | NY Islanders | 4–3 | New Jersey | OT | Kinkaid | 16,514 | 9–9–3 | 21 | Recap |
| 22 | November 25 | New Jersey | 2–5 | Tampa Bay | | Schneider | 19,092 | 9–10–3 | 21 | Recap |
| 23 | November 26 | New Jersey | 3–4 | Florida | OT | Kinkaid | 9,456 | 9–10–4 | 22 | Recap |
| 24 | November 30 | New Jersey | 3–6 | Washington | | Kinkaid | 18,506 | 9–11–4 | 22 | Recap |

December: 6–5–3 (Home: 4–3–1; Road: 2–2–2)
| # | Date | Visitor | Score | Home | OT | Decision | Attendance | Record | Pts | Recap |
|---|---|---|---|---|---|---|---|---|---|---|
| 25 | December 1 | Winnipeg | 4–3 | New Jersey | OT | Kinkaid | 16,514 | 9–11–5 | 23 | Recap |
| 26 | December 3 | Tampa Bay | 5–1 | New Jersey | | Kinkaid | 13,394 | 9–12–5 | 23 | Recap |
| 27 | December 6 | New Jersey | 6–3 | Los Angeles | | Kinkaid | 17,568 | 10–12–5 | 25 | Recap |
| 28 | December 9 | New Jersey | 5–6 | Anaheim | SO | Schneider | 16,470 | 10–12–6 | 26 | Recap |
| 29 | December 10 | New Jersey | 2–5 | San Jose | | Kinkaid | 17,097 | 10–13–6 | 26 | Recap |
| 30 | December 14 | Vegas | 4–5 | New Jersey | OT | Kinkaid | 14.076 | 11–13–6 | 28 | Recap |
| 31 | December 15 | New Jersey | 1–2 | Nashville | SO | Kinkaid | 17,446 | 11–13–7 | 29 | Recap |
| 32 | December 18 | Toronto | 7–2 | New Jersey | | Kinkaid | 14,586 | 11–14–7 | 29 | Recap |
| 33 | December 20 | New Jersey | 1–2 | Columbus | | Blackwood | 15,595 | 11–15–7 | 29 | Recap |
| 34 | December 21 | Ottawa | 2–5 | New Jersey | | Kinkaid | 14,614 | 12–15–7 | 31 | Recap |
| 35 | December 23 | Columbus | 3–0 | New Jersey | | Kinkaid | 12,872 | 12–16–7 | 31 | Recap |
| 36 | December 27 | New Jersey | 5–2 | Boston | | Blackwood | 17,565 | 13–16–7 | 33 | Recap |
| 37 | December 29 | Carolina | 0–2 | New Jersey | | Blackwood | 16,514 | 14–16–7 | 35 | Recap |
| 38 | December 31 | Vancouver | 0–4 | New Jersey | | Blackwood | 15,772 | 15–16–7 | 37 | Recap |

January: 4–8–0 (Home: 2–3–0; Road: 2–5–0)
| # | Date | Visitor | Score | Home | OT | Decision | Attendance | Record | Pts | Recap |
|---|---|---|---|---|---|---|---|---|---|---|
| 39 | January 2 | New Jersey | 4–5 | Dallas | | Blackwood | 18,133 | 15–17–7 | 37 | Recap |
| 40 | January 4 | New Jersey | 3–2 | Arizona | SO | Kinkaid | 12,636 | 16–17–7 | 39 | Recap |
| 41 | January 6 | New Jersey | 2–3 | Vegas | | Kinkaid | 18,103 | 16–18–7 | 39 | Recap |
| 42 | January 8 | New Jersey | 1–5 | Buffalo | | Kinkaid | 18,212 | 16–19–7 | 39 | Recap |
| 43 | January 10 | Toronto | 4–2 | New Jersey | | Kinkaid | 15,280 | 16–20–7 | 39 | Recap |
| 44 | January 12 | Philadelphia | 2–3 | New Jersey | | Blackwood | 16,514 | 17–20–7 | 41 | Recap |
| 45 | January 14 | Chicago | 5–8 | New Jersey | | Blackwood | 15,204 | 18–20–7 | 43 | Recap |
| 46 | January 15 | New Jersey | 1–4 | Columbus | | Kinkaid | 16,377 | 18–21–7 | 43 | Recap |
| 47 | January 17 | New Jersey | 1–4 | NY Islanders | | Blackwood | 12,088 | 18–22–7 | 43 | Recap |
| 48 | January 19 | Anaheim | 3–2 | New Jersey | | Blackwood | 15,231 | 18–23–7 | 43 | Recap |
| 49 | January 28 | New Jersey | 6–3 | Pittsburgh | | Kinkaid | 18,609 | 19–23–7 | 45 | Recap |
| 50 | January 31 | NY Rangers | 4–3 | New Jersey | | Kinkaid | 16,514 | 19–24–7 | 45 | Recap |

February: 6–7–1 (Home: 4–4–1; Road: 2–3–0)
| # | Date | Visitor | Score | Home | OT | Decision | Attendance | Record | Pts | Recap |
|---|---|---|---|---|---|---|---|---|---|---|
| 51 | February 2 | New Jersey | 3–2 | Montreal | OT | Blackwood | 21,302 | 20–24–7 | 47 | Recap |
| 52 | February 5 | Los Angeles | 5–1 | New Jersey | | Kinkaid | 14,508 | 20–25–7 | 47 | Recap |
| 53 | February 7 | NY Islanders | 2–1 | New Jersey | SO | Schneider | 13,265 | 20–25–8 | 48 | Recap |
| 54 | February 9 | Minnesota | 4–2 | New Jersey | | Schneider | 15,783 | 20–26–8 | 48 | Recap |
| 55 | February 10 | Carolina | 2–3 | New Jersey | | Kinkaid | 16,514 | 21–26–8 | 50 | Recap |
| 56 | February 12 | New Jersey | 3–8 | St. Louis | | Kinkaid | 17,509 | 21–27–8 | 50 | Recap |
| 57 | February 14 | New Jersey | 2–5 | Chicago | | Schneider | 21,038 | 21–28–8 | 50 | Recap |
| 58 | February 15 | New Jersey | 5–4 | Minnesota | OT | Schneider | 19,041 | 22–28–8 | 52 | Recap |
| 59 | February 17 | Buffalo | 1–4 | New Jersey | | Schneider | 16,514 | 23–28–8 | 54 | Recap |
| 60 | February 19 | Pittsburgh | 4–3 | New Jersey | | Kinkaid | 15,824 | 23–29–8 | 54 | Recap |
| 61 | February 21 | Ottawa | 0–4 | New Jersey | | Schneider | 12,964 | 24–29–8 | 56 | Recap |
| 62 | February 23 | New Jersey | 2–5 | NY Rangers | | Schneider | 17,371 | 24–30–8 | 56 | Recap |
| 63 | February 25 | Montreal | 1–2 | New Jersey | | Schneider | 12,791 | 25–30–8 | 58 | Recap |
| 64 | February 27 | Calgary | 2–1 | New Jersey | | Blackwood | 12,019 | 25–31–8 | 58 | Recap |

March: 4–9–2 (Home: 2–3–2; Road: 2–6–0)
| # | Date | Visitor | Score | Home | OT | Decision | Attendance | Record | Pts | Recap |
|---|---|---|---|---|---|---|---|---|---|---|
| 65 | March 1 | Philadelphia | 6–3 | New Jersey | | Schneider | 15,247 | 25–32–8 | 58 | Recap |
| 66 | March 2 | New Jersey | 0–1 | Boston | | Blackwood | 17,565 | 25–33–8 | 58 | Recap |
| 67 | March 5 | Columbus | 2–1 | New Jersey | SO | Schneider | 12,085 | 25–33–9 | 59 | Recap |
| 68 | March 8 | New Jersey | 0–3 | Washington | | Blackwood | 18,506 | 25–34–9 | 59 | Recap |
| 69 | March 9 | New Jersey | 2–4 | NY Rangers | | Schneider | 17,386 | 25–35–9 | 59 | Recap |
| 70 | March 12 | New Jersey | 4–9 | Calgary | | Blackwood | 18,529 | 25–36–9 | 59 | Recap |
| 71 | March 13 | New Jersey | 6–3 | Edmonton | | Schneider | 18,347 | 26–36–9 | 61 | Recap |
| 72 | March 15 | New Jersey | 3–2 | Vancouver | SO | Blackwood | 17,552 | 27–36–9 | 63 | Recap |
| 73 | March 17 | New Jersey | 0–3 | Colorado | | Schneider | 18,037 | 27–37–9 | 63 | Recap |
| 74 | March 19 | Washington | 4–1 | New Jersey | | Blackwood | 14,815 | 27–38–9 | 63 | Recap |
| 75 | March 21 | Boston | 5–1 | New Jersey | | Schneider | 14,649 | 27–39–9 | 63 | Recap |
| 76 | March 23 | Arizona | 1–2 | New Jersey | SO | Blackwood | 16,514 | 28–39–9 | 65 | Recap |
| 77 | March 25 | Buffalo | 1–3 | New Jersey | | Schneider | 12,053 | 29–39–9 | 67 | Recap |
| 78 | March 29 | New Jersey | 0–4 | Detroit | | Blackwood | 19,515 | 29–40–9 | 67 | Recap |
| 79 | March 30 | St. Louis | 3–2 | New Jersey | OT | Schneider | 16,514 | 29–40–10 | 68 | Recap |

April: 2–1–0 (Home: 1–0–0; Road: 1–1–0)
| # | Date | Visitor | Score | Home | OT | Decision | Attendance | Record | Pts | Recap |
|---|---|---|---|---|---|---|---|---|---|---|
| 80 | April 1 | NY Rangers | 2–4 | New Jersey | | Blackwood | 14,776 | 30–40–10 | 70 | Recap |
| 81 | April 4 | New Jersey | 1–3 | Carolina | | Schneider | 17,645 | 30–41–10 | 70 | Recap |
| 82 | April 6 | New Jersey | 4–3 | Florida | OT | Blackwood | 15,259 | 31–41–10 | 72 | Recap |

Legend: Win (2 points) Loss (0 points) Overtime/shootout loss (1 point)
Notes:
^{a} Game was played at Scandinavium in Gothenburg, Sweden.

== Player statistics ==
As of April 6, 2019

=== Skaters ===
Regular season
| Player | GP | G | A | Pts | +/− | PIM |
|---|---|---|---|---|---|---|
| Kyle Palmieri | 74 | 27 | 23 | 50 | –9 | 42 |
| Nico Hischier | 69 | 17 | 30 | 47 | 0 | 24 |
| Travis Zajac | 80 | 19 | 27 | 46 | –25 | 20 |
| Damon Severson | 82 | 11 | 28 | 39 | –27 | 56 |
| Taylor Hall | 33 | 11 | 26 | 37 | –6 | 16 |
| Blake Coleman | 78 | 22 | 14 | 36 | –19 | 71 |
| Jesper Bratt | 51 | 8 | 25 | 33 | –8 | 6 |
| Will Butcher | 78 | 4 | 26 | 30 | –17 | 18 |
| Marcus Johansson^{‡} | 48 | 12 | 15 | 27 | –15 | 8 |
| Pavel Zacha | 61 | 13 | 12 | 25 | –6 | 15 |
| Andy Greene | 82 | 5 | 20 | 25 | –9 | 16 |
| Miles Wood | 63 | 10 | 14 | 24 | –10 | 91 |
| Brian Boyle^{‡} | 47 | 13 | 6 | 19 | –13 | 22 |
| Sami Vatanen | 50 | 4 | 13 | 17 | –17 | 22 |
| Brett Seney | 51 | 5 | 8 | 13 | –14 | 31 |
| Drew Stafford | 57 | 5 | 8 | 13 | –7 | 18 |
| Kenny Agostino | 27 | 4 | 9 | 13 | –2 | 6 |
| Mirco Müller | 53 | 1 | 10 | 11 | –3 | 17 |
| Kevin Rooney | 41 | 6 | 4 | 10 | –4 | 15 |
| Stefan Noesen | 41 | 3 | 5 | 8 | –19 | 28 |
| Joey Anderson | 34 | 4 | 3 | 7 | –7 | 6 |
| Egor Yakovlev | 25 | 2 | 5 | 7 | –6 | 6 |
| Ben Lovejoy^{‡} | 51 | 2 | 5 | 7 | +1 | 33 |
| Connor Carrick^{†} | 20 | 1 | 6 | 7 | –6 | 6 |
| Jean-Sébastien Dea | 20 | 3 | 2 | 5 | –1 | 6 |
| Kurtis Gabriel | 22 | 2 | 2 | 4 | 0 | 59 |
| Steven Santini | 39 | 1 | 3 | 4 | –6 | 16 |
| Nathan Bastian | 7 | 3 | 0 | 3 | 0 | 10 |
| Michael McLeod | 21 | 0 | 3 | 3 | –8 | 13 |
| John Quenneville | 19 | 1 | 0 | 1 | –1 | 4 |
| Eric Tangradi | 6 | 0 | 1 | 1 | –3 | 0 |
| Ryan Murphy^{†} | 1 | 0 | 1 | 1 | 0 | 0 |
| Blake Pietila | 19 | 0 | 1 | 1 | –7 | 6 |
| Colton White | 3 | 0 | 0 | 0 | –2 | 2 |
| Josh Jacobs | 1 | 0 | 0 | 0 | –1 | 0 |
| Nick Lappin | 11 | 0 | 0 | 0 | –6 | 0 |
| Brandon Gignac | 1 | 0 | 0 | 0 | –2 | 0 |
| Eric Gryba | 10 | 0 | 0 | 0 | –1 | 10 |

=== Goaltenders ===
Regular season
| Player | GP | GS | TOI | W | L | OT | GA | GAA | SA | SV% | SO | G | A | PIM |
|---|---|---|---|---|---|---|---|---|---|---|---|---|---|---|
| Keith Kinkaid^{‡} | 41 | 38 | 2,301:58 | 15 | 18 | 6 | 129 | 3.36 | 1,188 | .891 | 3 | 0 | 0 | 0 |
| Mackenzie Blackwood | 23 | 21 | 1,263:52 | 10 | 10 | 0 | 55 | 2.61 | 669 | .918 | 2 | 0 | 0 | 0 |
| Cory Schneider | 26 | 23 | 1,371:47 | 6 | 13 | 4 | 70 | 3.06 | 718 | .903 | 1 | 0 | 0 | 0 |

- ^{†} Denotes player spent time with another team before joining the Devils. Stats reflect time with the Devils only.
- ^{‡} Denotes player was traded mid-season. Stats reflect time with the Devils only.
- Bold/italics denotes franchise record.

== Awards and honors ==
=== Awards ===
Regular season
| Player | Award | Date |
|---|---|---|
| Mackenzie Blackwood | NHL Third Star of the Week | December 31, 2018 |

== Transactions ==
The Devils have been involved in the following transactions during the 2018–19 season.

=== Trades ===
| Date | Details | | Ref |
|---|---|---|---|
| January 30, 2019 | To Minnesota Wild Michael Kapla | To New Jersey Devils Ryan Murphy | |
| February 6, 2019 | To Nashville Predators Brian Boyle | To New Jersey Devils 2nd-round pick in 2019 | |
| February 23, 2019 | To Dallas Stars Ben Lovejoy | To New Jersey Devils Connor Carrick; 3rd-round pick in 2019 | |
| February 25, 2019 | To Columbus Blue Jackets Keith Kinkaid | To New Jersey Devils 5th-round pick in 2022 | |
| February 25, 2019 | To Boston Bruins Marcus Johansson | To New Jersey Devils 2nd-round pick in 2019; 4th-round pick in 2020 | |

=== Free agents ===
| Date | Player | Team | Contract term | Ref |
|---|---|---|---|---|
| July 1, 2018 | Kurtis Gabriel | from Minnesota Wild | 1-year | |
| July 1, 2018 | Michael Grabner | to Arizona Coyotes | 3-year | |
| July 1, 2018 | Eric Gryba | from Edmonton Oilers | 1-year | |
| July 1, 2018 | Jimmy Hayes | to Pittsburgh Penguins | 1-year | |
| July 1, 2018 | John Moore | to Boston Bruins | 5-year | |
| July 1, 2018 | John Ramage | from Nashville Predators | 1-year | |
| July 2, 2018 | Brian Gibbons | to Anaheim Ducks | 1-year | |
| July 3, 2018 | Ken Appleby | to Manitoba Moose (AHL) | 1-year | |
| July 10, 2018 | Patrick Maroon | to St. Louis Blues | 1-year | |
| July 19, 2018 | Michael Latta | to Kunlun Red Star (KHL) | 1-year | |
| July 23, 2018 | Bracken Kearns | to Black Wings Linz (EBEL) | Unknown | |
| July 25, 2018 | Eric Tangradi | from Detroit Red Wings | 1-year | |
| July 30, 2018 | Mario Lucia | to Stavanger Oilers (GET-ligaen) | Unknown | |
| September 5, 2018 | Ben Thomson | to San Diego Gulls (AHL) | 1-year | |
| September 25, 2018 | Jérémy Groleau | from Chicoutimi Saguenéens (QMJHL) | 1-year | |
| February 24, 2019 | Evan Cormier | from Binghamton Devils (AHL) | 3-year | |
| May 9, 2019 | John Ramage | to Eisbären Berlin (DEL) | 2-year | |
| May 15, 2019 | Egor Yakovlev | to Metallurg Magnitogorsk (KHL) | 2-year | |

=== Waivers ===
| Date | Player | Team | Ref |
|---|---|---|---|
| September 28, 2018 | Jean-Sébastien Dea | from Pittsburgh Penguins | |
| November 29, 2018 | Jean-Sébastien Dea | to Pittsburgh Penguins | |
| February 11, 2019 | Kenny Agostino | from Montreal Canadiens | |

=== Signings ===
| Date | Player | Contract term | Ref |
|---|---|---|---|
| June 30, 2018 | Eddie Läck | 1-year | |
| July 16, 2018 | Michael Kapla | 1-year | |
| July 17, 2018 | Blake Coleman | 3-year | |
| July 17, 2018 | Stefan Noesen | 1-year | |
| July 20, 2018 | Nick Lappin | 1-year | |
| July 25, 2018 | Yegor Sharangovich | 3-year | |
| August 13, 2018 | Kevin Rooney | 2-year | |
| August 14, 2018 | Steven Santini | 3-year | |
| August 20, 2018 | Ty Smith | 3-year | |
| September 22, 2018 | Miles Wood | 4-year | |
| October 5, 2018 | Drew Stafford | 1-year | |
| April 3, 2019 | Jeremy Davies | 2-year | |
| April 17, 2019 | Gilles Senn | 2-year | |
| May 13, 2019 | Mikhail Maltsev | 3-year | |
| May 13, 2019 | Fabian Zetterlund | 3-year | |
| June 10, 2019 | Jesper Boqvist | 3-year | |

== Draft picks ==
Below are the New Jersey Devils' selections at the 2018 NHL entry draft, which was held on June 22 and 23, 2018, at the American Airlines Center in Dallas, Texas.

| Round | # | Player | Pos | Nationality | College/junior/club team |
|---|---|---|---|---|---|
| 1 | 17 | Ty Smith | D | Canada | Spokane Chiefs (WHL) |
| 4 | 110 | Xavier Bernard | D | Canada | Drummondville Voltigeurs (QMJHL) |
| 5 | 136^{1} | Akira Schmid | G | Switzerland | SCL Tigers U20 (Junioren Elite A) |
| 5 | 141 | Yegor Sharangovich | C | Belarus | Dinamo Minsk (KHL) |
| 6 | 172 | Mitchell Hoelscher | C | Canada | Ottawa 67's (OHL) |
| 7 | 203 | Eetu Päkkilä | LW | Finland | Kärpät (Liiga) |

1. The Calgary Flames' fifth-round pick went to the New Jersey Devils as the result of a trade on October 28, 2017, that sent Scott Wedgewood to Arizona in exchange for this pick.
