= 2018–19 New York Islanders season =

Professional ice hockey team season

2018–19 New York Islanders
- Division: 2nd Metropolitan
- Conference: 4th Eastern
- 2018–19 record: 48–27–7
- Home record: 24–13–4
- Road record: 24–14–3
- Goals for: 228
- Goals against: 196

Team information
- General manager: Lou Lamoriello
- Coach: Barry Trotz
- Captain: Anders Lee
- Alternate captains: Josh Bailey; Cal Clutterbuck; Andrew Ladd
- Arena: Barclays Center; Nassau Veterans Memorial Coliseum
- Average attendance: 12,442
- Minor league affiliates: Bridgeport Sound Tigers (AHL); Worcester Railers (ECHL)

Team leaders
- Goals: Anders Lee (28)
- Assists: Mathew Barzal (44)
- Points: Mathew Barzal (62)
- Penalty minutes: Scott Mayfield (68)
- Plus/minus: Casey Cizikas; Adam Pelech (+22)
- Wins: Robin Lehner (25)
- Goals against average: Christopher Gibson (1.50)

The 2018–19 New York Islanders season was the 47th season in the franchise's history. It was their fourth season in the Barclays Center in the New York City borough of Brooklyn, which they moved into after leaving Nassau Veterans Memorial Coliseum in Nassau County on Long Island at the conclusion of the 2014–15 season. The Islanders also used Nassau Veterans Memorial Coliseum as a part-time venue starting this year where they played half of their 41 regular season home games, and as well as all first-round playoff home games. The Islanders entered the season looking to improve on their 35–37–10 record from the previous season, as well as make the playoffs for the first time since the 2015–16 season. They were able to improve their performance, despite losing their longtime captain and franchise player John Tavares in free agency. The Islanders clinched a playoff spot on March 30, 2019, with a 5–1 win against the Buffalo Sabres. On April 16, the Islanders swept the Pittsburgh Penguins in the first round, making it their first playoff series sweep since the 1983 Stanley Cup playoffs. However, in the second round, the Islanders were not able to capitalize on their success against Pittsburgh, as they were swept by the Carolina Hurricanes.

== Standings ==
=== Divisional standings ===
Metropolitan Division
Pos	Team	GP	W	L	OTL	ROW	GF	GA	GD	Pts
1	y – Washington Capitals	82	48	26	8	44	278	249	+29	104
2	x – New York Islanders	82	48	27	7	43	228	196	+32	103
3	x – Pittsburgh Penguins	82	44	26	12	42	273	241	+32	100
4	x – Carolina Hurricanes	82	46	29	7	44	245	223	+22	99
5	x – Columbus Blue Jackets	82	47	31	4	45	258	232	+26	98
6	Philadelphia Flyers	82	37	37	8	34	244	281	−37	82
7	New York Rangers	82	32	36	14	26	227	272	−45	78
8	New Jersey Devils	82	31	41	10	28	222	275	−53	72

Source: National Hockey League
x – Clinched playoff spot; y – Clinched division

=== Conference standings ===
Top 3 (Metropolitan Division)
Pos	Team	GP	W	L	OTL	ROW	GF	GA	GD	Pts
1	y – Washington Capitals	82	48	26	8	44	278	249	+29	104
2	x – New York Islanders	82	48	27	7	43	228	196	+32	103
3	x – Pittsburgh Penguins	82	44	26	12	42	273	241	+32	100

Source: National Hockey League
x – Clinched playoff spot; y – Clinched division

== Schedule and results ==
=== Preseason ===
The preseason schedule was published on June 15, 2018.

2018 preseason game log: 5–3–0 (Home: 3–1–0; Road: 2–2–0)
#	Date	Visitor	Score	Home	OT	Decision	Attendance	Record	Recap
1^{[a]}	September 16	Philadelphia	0–3	NY Islanders		Lehner	—	1–0–0	Recap
2	September 17	NY Islanders	1–3	Philadelphia		Greiss	17,725	1–1–0	Recap
3	September 18	Philadelphia	5–1	NY Islanders		Lehner	4,744	1–2–0	Recap
4	September 20	New Jersey	0–2	NY Islanders		Greiss	4,722	2–2–0	Recap
5^{[b]}	September 21	NY Islanders	3–2	Philadelphia	OT	Lehner	—	3–2–0	Recap
6^{[c]}	September 22	NY Rangers	2–5	NY Islanders		Greiss	—	4–2–0	Recap
7	September 26	NY Islanders	4–3	NY Rangers	OT	Lehner	13,347	5–2–0	Recap
8^{[d]}	September 28	NY Islanders	4–5	Buffalo		Greiss	—	5–3–0	Recap
Notes:^{a} Game was played at Nassau Veterans Memorial Coliseum in Uniondale, New York.^{b} Game was played at PPL Center in Allentown, Pennsylvania.^{c} Game was played at Webster Bank Arena in Bridgeport, Connecticut.^{d} Game was played at Tribute Communities Centre in Oshawa, Ontario.

=== Regular season ===
The regular season schedule was released on June 21, 2018.

2018–19 game log

October: 6–4–1 (Home: 1–1–1; Road: 5–3–0)
#	Date	Visitor	Score	Home	OT	Decision	Attendance	Record	Pts	Recap
1	October 4	NY Islanders	2–1	Carolina	OT	Greiss	18,680	1–0–0	2	Recap
2^{[a]}	October 6	Nashville	4–3	NY Islanders		Greiss	12,163	1–1–0	2	Recap
3^{[a]}	October 8	San Jose	0–4	NY Islanders		Lehner	8,790	2–1–0	4	Recap
4	October 13	NY Islanders	2–5	Nashville		Lehner	17,208	2–2–0	4	Recap
5	October 17	NY Islanders	1–4	Anaheim		Greiss	16,909	2–3–0	4	Recap
6	October 18	NY Islanders	7–2	Los Angeles		Lehner	18,230	3–3–0	6	Recap
7	October 20	NY Islanders	1–4	San Jose		Lehner	17,414	3–4–0	6	Recap
8^{[a]}	October 24	Florida	3–2	NY Islanders	OT	Lehner	9,743	3–4–1	7	Recap
9	October 27	NY Islanders	6–1	Philadelphia		Lehner	19,247	4–4–1	9	Recap
10	October 28	NY Islanders	2–1	Carolina		Greiss	10,367	5–4–1	11	Recap
11	October 30	NY Islanders	6–3	Pittsburgh		Lehner	18,509	6–4–1	13	Recap

November: 6–5–2 (Home: 5–2–1; Road: 1–3–1)
#	Date	Visitor	Score	Home	OT	Decision	Attendance	Record	Pts	Recap
12^{[a]}	November 1	Pittsburgh	2–3	NY Islanders	SO	Greiss	10,910	7–4–1	15	Recap
13^{[a]}	November 3	New Jersey	0–3	NY Islanders		Greiss	11,901	8–4–1	17	Recap
14^{[a]}	November 5	Montreal	4–3	NY Islanders	SO	Greiss	9,402	8–4–2	18	Recap
15	November 8	NY Islanders	2–4	Tampa Bay		Lehner	19,092	8–5–2	18	Recap
16	November 10	NY Islanders	2–4	Florida		Lehner	11,947	8–6–2	18	Recap
17^{[a]}	November 13	Vancouver	2–5	NY Islanders		Greiss	8,806	9–6–2	20	Recap
18^{[a]}	November 15	NY Rangers	5–7	NY Islanders		Greiss	13,472	10–6–2	22	Recap
19^{[a]}	November 18	Dallas	6–2	NY Islanders		Greiss	10,650	10–7–2	22	Recap
20	November 21	NY Islanders	0–5	NY Rangers		Lehner	17,297	10–8–2	22	Recap
21	November 23	NY Islanders	4–3	New Jersey	OT	Greiss	16,514	11–8–2	24	Recap
22^{[a]}	November 24	Carolina	1–4	NY Islanders		Greiss	10,015	12–8–2	26	Recap
23^{[a]}	November 26	Washington	4–1	NY Islanders		Greiss	9,072	12–9–2	26	Recap
24	November 29	NY Islanders	1–2	Boston	SO	Lehner	17,565	12–9–3	27	Recap

December: 9–4–1 (Home: 3–2–1; Road: 6–2–0)
#	Date	Visitor	Score	Home	OT	Decision	Attendance	Record	Pts	Recap
25^{[b]}	December 1	Columbus	2–3	NY Islanders		Greiss	13,917	13–9–3	29	Recap
26^{[a]}	December 4	Winnipeg	3–1	NY Islanders		Greiss	9,125	13–10–3	29	Recap
27	December 6	NY Islanders	2–6	Pittsburgh		Greiss	18,440	13–11–3	29	Recap
28	December 8	NY Islanders	3–2	Detroit		Greiss	19,515	14–11–3	31	Recap
29^{[b]}	December 10	Pittsburgh	2–1	NY Islanders	SO	Lehner	13,917	14–11–4	32	Recap
30^{[a]}	December 12	Vegas	3–2	NY Islanders		Lehner	9,182	14–12–4	32	Recap
31^{[b]}	December 15	Detroit	3–4	NY Islanders	SO	Greiss	13,917	15–12–4	34	Recap
32	December 17	NY Islanders	4–1	Colorado		Greiss	15,066	16–12–4	36	Recap
33	December 18	NY Islanders	3–1	Arizona		Lehner	11,640	17–12–4	38	Recap
34	December 20	NY Islanders	2–4	Vegas		Greiss	18,226	17–13–4	38	Recap
35	December 23	NY Islanders	3–1	Dallas		Lehner	18,031	18–13–4	40	Recap
36^{[a]}	December 28	Ottawa	3–6	NY Islanders		Lehner	13,434	19–13–4	42	Recap
37	December 29	NY Islanders	4–0	Toronto		Lehner	19,514	20–13–4	44	Recap
38	December 31	NY Islanders	3–1	Buffalo		Lehner	19,070	21–13–4	46	Recap

January: 8–2–1 (Home: 5–2–0; Road: 3–0–1)
#	Date	Visitor	Score	Home	OT	Decision	Attendance	Record	Pts	Recap
39^{[b]}	January 3	Chicago	2–3	NY Islanders	OT	Lehner	13,454	22–13–4	48	Recap
40	January 5	NY Islanders	4–3	St. Louis		Lehner	16,801	23–13–4	50	Recap
41^{[b]}	January 8	Carolina	4–3	NY Islanders		Greiss	13,769	23–14–4	50	Recap
42	January 10	NY Islanders	4–3	NY Rangers		Lehner	17,938	24–14–4	52	Recap
43^{[a]}	January 12	NY Rangers	2–1	NY Islanders		Lehner	15,497	24–15–4	52	Recap
44^{[a]}	January 13	Tampa Bay	1–5	NY Islanders		Greiss	11,193	25–15–4	54	Recap
45^{[a]}	January 15	St. Louis	1–2	NY Islanders	OT	Lehner	10,402	26–15–4	56	Recap
46^{[b]}	January 17	New Jersey	1–4	NY Islanders		Lehner	12,088	27–15–4	58	Recap
47	January 18	NY Islanders	2–0	Washington		Greiss	18,506	28–15–4	60	Recap
48^{[b]}	January 20	Anaheim	0–3	NY Islanders		Lehner	13,917	29–15–4	62	Recap
49	January 22	NY Islanders	2–3	Chicago	SO	Lehner	21,330	29–15–5	63	Recap

February: 8–4–2 (Home: 5–1–1; Road: 3–3–1)
#	Date	Visitor	Score	Home	OT	Decision	Attendance	Record	Pts	Recap
50^{[b]}	February 1	Tampa Bay	1–0	NY Islanders	SO	Greiss	13,971	29–15–6	64	Recap
51^{[b]}	February 2	Los Angeles	2–4	NY Islanders		Lehner	13,917	30–15–6	66	Recap
52	February 5	NY Islanders	1–3	Boston		Lehner	17,565	30–16–6	66	Recap
53	February 7	NY Islanders	2–1	New Jersey	SO	Greiss	13,265	31–16–6	68	Recap
54^{[a]}	February 9	Colorado	3–4	NY Islanders	OT	Lehner	14,216	32–16–6	70	Recap
55^{[a]}	February 10	Minnesota	1–2	NY Islanders		Greiss	13,825	33–16–6	72	Recap
56	February 12	NY Islanders	1–3	Buffalo		Lehner	16,894	33–17–6	72	Recap
57	February 14	NY Islanders	3–0	Columbus		Greiss	16,531	34–17–6	74	Recap
58^{[a]}	February 16	Edmonton	2–5	NY Islanders		Lehner	14,812	35–17–6	76	Recap
59	February 20	NY Islanders	2–4	Calgary		Greiss	18,632	35–18–6	76	Recap
60	February 21	NY Islanders	3–4	Edmonton	OT	Lehner	18,347	35–18–7	77	Recap
61	February 23	NY Islanders	4–0	Vancouver		Lehner	18,871	36–18–7	79	Recap
62^{[b]}	February 26	Calgary	3–1	NY Islanders		Lehner	13,097	36–19–7	79	Recap
63^{[b]}	February 28	Toronto	1–6	NY Islanders		Lehner	13,917	37–19–7	81	Recap

March: 9–7–0 (Home: 5–4–0; Road: 4–3–0)
#	Date	Visitor	Score	Home	OT	Decision	Attendance	Record	Pts	Recap
64^{[b]}	March 1	Washington	3–1	NY Islanders		Greiss	13,971	37–20–7	81	Recap
65^{[b]}	March 3	Philadelphia	4–1	NY Islanders		Lehner	13,917	37–21–7	81	Recap
66^{[b]}	March 5	Ottawa	4–5	NY Islanders	SO	Greiss	11,445	38–21–7	83	Recap
67	March 7	NY Islanders	4–2	Ottawa		Greiss	11,967	39–21–7	85	Recap
68^{[b]}	March 9	Philadelphia	5–2	NY Islanders		Greiss	13,917	39–22–7	85	Recap
69^{[b]}	March 11	Columbus	0–2	NY Islanders		Greiss	11,827	40–22–7	87	Recap
70^{[b]}	March 14	Montreal	1–2	NY Islanders		Greiss	13,274	41–22–7	89	Recap
71	March 16	NY Islanders	1–2	Detroit		Greiss	19,515	41–23–7	89	Recap
72	March 17	NY Islanders	3–2	Minnesota	OT	Greiss	18,696	42–23–7	91	Recap
73^{[b]}	March 19	Boston	5–0	NY Islanders		Lehner	13,917	42–24–7	91	Recap
74	March 21	NY Islanders	0–4	Montreal		Greiss	21,302	42–25–7	91	Recap
75	March 23	NY Islanders	4–2	Philadelphia		Lehner	19,668	43–25–7	93	Recap
76^{[b]}	March 24	Arizona	0–2	NY Islanders		Lehner	13,917	44–25–7	95	Recap
77	March 26	NY Islanders	0–4	Columbus		Greiss	17,928	44–26–7	95	Recap
78	March 28	NY Islanders	5–4	Winnipeg		Lehner	15,321	45–26–7	97	Recap
79^{[b]}	March 30	Buffalo	1–5	NY Islanders		Lehner	13,917	46–26–7	99	Recap

April: 2–1–0 (Home: 0–1–0; Road: 2–0–0)
#	Date	Visitor	Score	Home	OT	Decision	Attendance	Record	Pts	Recap
80^{[b]}	April 1	Toronto	2–1	NY Islanders		Lehner	13,917	46–27–7	99	Recap
81	April 4	NY Islanders	2–1	Florida	SO	Greiss	13,775	47–27–7	101	Recap
82	April 6	NY Islanders	3–0	Washington		Lehner	18,506	48–27–7	103	Recap

Legend: Win (2 points) Loss (0 points) Overtime/shootout loss (1 point)
Notes:
^{a} Game was played at Barclays Center in Brooklyn, New York.
^{b} Game was played at Nassau Veterans Memorial Coliseum in Uniondale, New York.

=== Playoffs ===
The Islanders faced the Pittsburgh Penguins in the first round of the playoffs at Nassau Veterans Memorial Coliseum, and swept the series in four games, marking the first time since the 1982–83 season that they swept the series.

The Islanders faced the Carolina Hurricanes in the second round of the playoffs at Barclays Center, and were swept in four games.

2019 Stanley Cup playoffs

Eastern Conference first round vs. (M3) Pittsburgh Penguins: Islanders won 4–0
#	Date	Visitor	Score	Home	OT	Decision	Attendance	Series	Recap
1	April 10	Pittsburgh	3–4	NY Islanders	OT	Lehner	13,917	1–0	Recap
2	April 12	Pittsburgh	1–3	NY Islanders		Lehner	13,917	2–0	Recap
3	April 14	NY Islanders	4–1	Pittsburgh		Lehner	18,610	3–0	Recap
4	April 16	NY Islanders	3–1	Pittsburgh		Lehner	18,609	4–0	Recap

Eastern Conference second round vs. (WC1) Carolina Hurricanes: Hurricanes won 4–0
#	Date	Visitor	Score	Home	OT	Decision	Attendance	Series	Recap
1	April 26	Carolina	1–0	NY Islanders	OT	Lehner	15,795	0–1	Recap
2	April 28	Carolina	2–1	NY Islanders		Lehner	15,795	0–2	Recap
3	May 1	NY Islanders	2–5	Carolina		Lehner	19,066	0–3	Recap
4	May 3	NY Islanders	2–5	Carolina		Lehner	19,495	0–4	Recap

Legend: Win Loss

== Player statistics ==
As of May 3, 2019

=== Skaters ===
Regular season
Player	GP	G	A	Pts	+/−	PIM
Mathew Barzal	82	18	44	62	–5	46
Josh Bailey	82	16	40	56	+8	21
Brock Nelson	82	25	28	53	+20	28
Anders Lee	82	28	23	51	+20	58
Jordan Eberle	78	19	18	37	–6	17
Ryan Pulock	82	9	28	37	+21	22
Casey Cizikas	73	20	13	33	+22	36
Valtteri Filppula	72	17	14	31	+19	16
Anthony Beauvillier	71	18	10	28	+1	8
Leo Komarov	82	6	20	26	+18	42
Nick Leddy	82	4	22	26	0	18
Cal Clutterbuck	73	8	15	23	+6	44
Adam Pelech	78	5	16	21	+22	24
Scott Mayfield	79	4	15	19	+18	68
Johnny Boychuk	74	3	16	19	+10	25
Devon Toews	48	5	13	18	+7	4
Matt Martin	67	6	8	14	+5	53
Andrew Ladd	26	3	8	11	+3	16
Tom Kühnhackl	36	4	5	9	+1	10
Michael Dal Colle	28	3	4	7	+3	2
Ross Johnston	17	1	3	4	+3	23
Thomas Hickey	40	0	4	4	+5	33
Josh Ho-Sang	10	1	1	2	+2	6
Tanner Fritz	8	0	1	1	–3	2
Luca Sbisa	9	0	1	1	0	4
Stephen Gionta	5	0	0	0	–4	0

Playoffs
Player	GP	G	A	Pts	+/−	PIM
Jordan Eberle	8	4	5	9	+4	2
Mathew Barzal	8	2	5	7	+2	8
Josh Bailey	8	4	2	6	+2	0
Devon Toews	8	1	4	5	–3	0
Brock Nelson	8	4	0	4	–2	2
Anders Lee	8	1	3	4	–1	8
Valtteri Filppula	8	0	4	4	0	2
Tom Kühnhackl	8	0	3	3	0	2
Leo Komarov	8	1	1	2	+1	8
Anthony Beauvillier	8	1	1	2	0	0
Adam Pelech	8	0	2	2	+1	6
Scott Mayfield	8	0	2	2	–1	8
Nick Leddy	8	1	0	1	–1	0
Ryan Pulock	8	0	1	1	–2	4
Johnny Boychuk	4	0	1	1	+2	0
Matt Martin	8	0	0	0	–4	0
Thomas Hickey	4	0	0	0	–3	0
Michael Dal Colle	1	0	0	0	–2	0
Cal Clutterbuck	7	0	0	0	–4	4
Casey Cizikas	8	0	0	0	–6	6

=== Goaltenders ===
Regular season
Player	GP	GS	TOI	W	L	OT	GA	GAA	SA	SV%	SO	G	A	PIM
Robin Lehner	46	43	2,615:49	25	13	5	93	2.13	1,323	.930	6	0	1	0
Thomas Greiss	43	39	2,293:42	23	14	2	87	2.28	1,185	.927	5	0	1	4
Christopher Gibson	2	0	40:00	0	0	0	1	1.50	17	.941	0	0	0	0

Playoffs
Player	GP	GS	TOI	W	L	GA	GAA	SA	SV%	SO	G	A	PIM
Robin Lehner	8	8	449:00	4	4	15	2.00	233	.936	0	0	0	2
Thomas Greiss	1	0	36:27	0	0	2	3.29	10	.800	0	0	0	0

- ^{†} Denotes player spent time with another team before joining the Islanders. Stats reflect time with the Islanders only.
- ^{‡} Denotes player was traded mid-season. Stats reflect time with the Islanders only.
- Bold/italics denotes franchise record.

== Awards and honors ==
=== Awards ===
Regular season
Player	Award	Date
Thomas Greiss	William M. Jennings Trophy	June 19, 2019
Robin Lehner	Bill Masterton Memorial Trophy	June 19, 2019
Robin Lehner	William M. Jennings Trophy	June 19, 2019
Barry Trotz	Jack Adams Award	June 19, 2019

== Transactions ==
The Islanders have been involved in the following transactions during the 2018–19 season.

=== Trades ===
Date	Details		Ref
July 3, 2018	To Toronto Maple Leafs Eamon McAdam	To New York Islanders Matt Martin	

=== Free agents ===
Date	Player	Team	Contract term	Ref
June 21, 2018	Kristers Gudļevskis	to Dinamo Riga (KHL)	Unknown	
July 1, 2018	Valtteri Filppula	from Philadelphia Flyers	1-year	
July 1, 2018	Jaroslav Halák	to Boston Bruins	2-year	
July 1, 2018	Leo Komarov	from Toronto Maple Leafs	4-year	
July 1, 2018	Alan Quine	to Calgary Flames	1-year	
July 1, 2018	John Tavares	to Toronto Maple Leafs	7-year	
July 1, 2018	Chris Wagner	to Boston Bruins	2-year	
July 2, 2018	Tom Kühnhackl	from Pittsburgh Penguins	1-year	
July 2, 2018	Matt Lorito	from Detroit Red Wings	2-year	
July 2, 2018	Mike Sislo	from Buffalo Sabres	1-year	
July 3, 2018	Calvin de Haan	to Carolina Hurricanes	4-year	
July 3, 2018	Robin Lehner	from Buffalo Sabres	1-year	
July 4, 2018	Nikolai Kulemin	to Metallurg Magnitogorsk (KHL)	3-year	
July 9, 2018	Connor Jones	to Bridgeport Sound Tigers (AHL)	Unknown	
July 9, 2018	Jan Kovář	from Metallurg Magnitogorsk (KHL)	1-year	
July 31, 2018	Kyle Schempp	to Idaho Steelheads (ECHL)	1-year	
August 4, 2018	Shane Prince	to Davos (NL)	2-year	
September 24, 2018	Luca Sbisa	from Vegas Golden Knights	1-year	
September 27, 2018	Brandon Davidson	to Chicago Blackhawks	1-year	
February 24, 2019	Jeremy Smith	from Bridgeport Sound Tigers (AHL)	1-year	
February 26, 2019	Dennis Seidenberg	None	1-year	
March 21, 2019	Grant Hutton	from Miami RedHawks (NCHC)	1-year	
March 26, 2019	Bobo Carpenter	from Boston University Terriers (Hockey East)	2-year	
April 2, 2019	Mason Jobst	from Ohio State Buckeyes (Big Ten)	2-year	
June 10, 2019	Jeremy Smith	to Kunlun Red Star (KHL)	2-year	

=== Contract terminations ===
Date	Player	Via	Ref
October 11, 2018	Jan Kovář	Mutual termination	
May 15, 2019	Yannick Rathgeb	Mutual termination	

=== Signings ===
Date	Player	Contract term	Ref
July 1, 2018	Thomas Hickey	4-year	
July 2, 2018	Christopher Gibson	2-year	
July 2, 2018	Seth Helgeson	2-year	
July 5, 2018	Jakub Škarek	3-year	
July 9, 2018	Ross Johnston	4-year	
July 16, 2018	Kyle Burroughs	2-year	
July 16, 2018	Devon Toews	2-year	
July 17, 2018	Ryan Pulock	2-year	
July 23, 2018	Brock Nelson	1-year	
August 13, 2018	Noah Dobson	3-year	
October 13, 2018	Stephen Gionta	1-year	
December 3, 2018	Bode Wilde	3-year	
March 28, 2019	Oliver Wahlstrom	3-year	
May 23, 2019	Brock Nelson	6-year	
May 31, 2019	Arnaud Durandeau	3-year	
June 14, 2019	Jordan Eberle	5-year	

== Draft picks ==
Below are the New York Islanders' selections at the 2018 NHL entry draft, which was held on June 22 and 23, 2018, at the American Airlines Center in Dallas, Texas.

Round	#	Player	Pos	Nationality	College/junior/club team
1	11	Oliver Wahlstrom	RW	United States	U.S. NTDP (USHL)
1	12^{1}	Noah Dobson	D	Canada	Acadie–Bathurst Titan (QMJHL)
2	41	Bode Wilde	D	United States	U.S. NTDP (USHL)
2	43^{1}	Ruslan Iskhakov	C	Russia	Krasnaya Armiya (MHL)
3	72	Jakub Škarek	G	Czech Republic	Dukla Jihlava (ELH)
4	103	Jacob Pivonka	C	United States	U.S. NTDP (USHL)
5	134	Blade Jenkins	LW	United States	Saginaw Spirit (OHL)
7	196	Christian Krygier	D	United States	Lincoln Stars (USHL)

Notes:

1. The Calgary Flames' first-round pick went to the New York Islanders as the result of a trade on June 24, 2017, that sent Travis Hamonic and a conditional fourth-round pick in 2019 to Calgary in exchange for a second-round pick in 2018, a conditional second-round pick in 2019 and this pick.
