= 2018–19 Columbus Blue Jackets season =

National Hockey League season

2018–19 Columbus Blue Jackets
- Division: 5th Metropolitan
- Conference: 8th Eastern
- 2018–19 record: 47–31–4
- Home record: 22–17–2
- Road record: 25–14–2
- Goals for: 258
- Goals against: 232

Team information
- General manager: Jarmo Kekäläinen
- Coach: John Tortorella
- Captain: Nick Foligno
- Alternate captains: Cam Atkinson; Boone Jenner; Seth Jones
- Arena: Nationwide Arena
- Average attendance: 16,658
- Minor league affiliate: Cleveland Monsters (AHL)

Team leaders
- Goals: Cam Atkinson (41)
- Assists: Artemi Panarin (59)
- Points: Artemi Panarin (87)
- Penalty minutes: Pierre-Luc Dubois (64)
- Plus/minus: Josh Anderson (+25)
- Wins: Sergei Bobrovsky (37)
- Goals against average: Sergei Bobrovsky (2.58)

The 2018–19 Columbus Blue Jackets season was the 19th season for the National Hockey League (NHL) franchise that was established on June 25, 1997. On April 5, 2019, the Blue Jackets clinched a playoff spot after a 3–2 shootout win over the New York Rangers.

The Blue Jackets won their first ever playoff series by sweeping the Presidents' Trophy winners, the Tampa Bay Lightning, in the First Round of the playoffs. However, the Blue Jackets were not able to carry their success into the Second Round, and they were eliminated by the Boston Bruins in six games.

== Standings ==
Metropolitan Division
| Pos | Team | GP | W | L | OTL | ROW | GF | GA | GD | Pts |
|---|---|---|---|---|---|---|---|---|---|---|
| 1 | y – Washington Capitals | 82 | 48 | 26 | 8 | 44 | 278 | 249 | +29 | 104 |
| 2 | x – New York Islanders | 82 | 48 | 27 | 7 | 43 | 228 | 196 | +32 | 103 |
| 3 | x – Pittsburgh Penguins | 82 | 44 | 26 | 12 | 42 | 273 | 241 | +32 | 100 |
| 4 | x – Carolina Hurricanes | 82 | 46 | 29 | 7 | 44 | 245 | 223 | +22 | 99 |
| 5 | x – Columbus Blue Jackets | 82 | 47 | 31 | 4 | 45 | 258 | 232 | +26 | 98 |
| 6 | Philadelphia Flyers | 82 | 37 | 37 | 8 | 34 | 244 | 281 | −37 | 82 |
| 7 | New York Rangers | 82 | 32 | 36 | 14 | 26 | 227 | 272 | −45 | 78 |
| 8 | New Jersey Devils | 82 | 31 | 41 | 10 | 28 | 222 | 275 | −53 | 72 |

Source: National Hockey League
x – Clinched playoff spot; y – Clinched division

Eastern Conference Wild Card
| Pos | Div | Team | GP | W | L | OTL | ROW | GF | GA | GD | Pts |
|---|---|---|---|---|---|---|---|---|---|---|---|
| 1 | ME | x – Carolina Hurricanes | 82 | 46 | 29 | 7 | 44 | 245 | 223 | +22 | 99 |
| 2 | ME | x – Columbus Blue Jackets | 82 | 47 | 31 | 4 | 45 | 258 | 232 | +26 | 98 |
| 3 | AT | Montreal Canadiens | 82 | 44 | 30 | 8 | 41 | 249 | 236 | +13 | 96 |
| 4 | AT | Florida Panthers | 82 | 36 | 32 | 14 | 33 | 267 | 280 | −13 | 86 |
| 5 | ME | Philadelphia Flyers | 82 | 37 | 37 | 8 | 34 | 244 | 281 | −37 | 82 |
| 6 | ME | New York Rangers | 82 | 32 | 36 | 14 | 26 | 227 | 272 | −45 | 78 |
| 7 | AT | Buffalo Sabres | 82 | 33 | 39 | 10 | 28 | 226 | 271 | −45 | 76 |
| 8 | AT | Detroit Red Wings | 82 | 32 | 40 | 10 | 29 | 227 | 277 | −50 | 74 |
| 9 | ME | New Jersey Devils | 82 | 31 | 41 | 10 | 28 | 222 | 275 | −53 | 72 |
| 10 | AT | Ottawa Senators | 82 | 29 | 47 | 6 | 29 | 242 | 302 | −60 | 64 |

Source: National Hockey League
x – Clinched playoff spot

== Schedule and results ==
=== Preseason ===
The preseason schedule was published on June 15, 2018.

2018 preseason game log: 3–5–0 (home: 2–2–0; road: 1–3–0)
| # | Date | Visitor | Score | Home | OT | Decision | Attendance | Record | Recap |
|---|---|---|---|---|---|---|---|---|---|
| 1 | September 17 | Buffalo | 4–1 | Columbus | | Thiessen | 9,845 | 0–1–0 | Recap |
| 2 | September 18 | Chicago | 1–4 | Columbus | | Berube | 10,422 | 1–1–0 | Recap |
| 3 | September 21 | Columbus | 0–3 | St. Louis | | Bobrovsky | 15,190 | 1–2–0 | Recap |
| 4 | September 22 | Columbus | 3–7 | Pittsburgh | | Korpisalo | 17,190 | 1–3–0 | Recap |
| 5 | September 23 | St. Louis | 5–1 | Columbus | | Bobrovsky | 11,758 | 1–4–0 | Recap |
| 6^{[a]} | September 25 | Columbus | 4–2 | Buffalo | | Korpisalo | — | 2–4–0 | Recap |
| 7 | September 28 | Pittsburgh | 6–7 | Columbus | | Bobrovsky | 13,976 | 3–4–0 | Recap |
| 8 | September 29 | Columbus | 1–4 | Chicago | | Korpisalo | 20,594 | 3–5–0 | Recap |
Notes:^{a} Game was played at Clinton Arena in Clinton, New York.

=== Regular season ===
The regular season schedule was released on June 21, 2018.

2018–19 game log

October: 6–5–0 (home: 3–4–0; road: 3–1–0)
| # | Date | Visitor | Score | Home | OT | Decision | Attendance | Record | Pts | Recap |
|---|---|---|---|---|---|---|---|---|---|---|
| 1 | October 4 | Columbus | 3–2 | Detroit | OT | Korpisalo | 19,515 | 1–0–0 | 2 | Recap |
| 2 | October 5 | Carolina | 3–1 | Columbus | | Bobrovsky | 18,306 | 1–1–0 | 2 | Recap |
| 3 | October 9 | Colorado | 2–5 | Columbus | | Bobrovsky | 11,694 | 2–1–0 | 4 | Recap |
| 4 | October 11 | Columbus | 5–4 | Florida | | Korpisalo | 14,394 | 3–1–0 | 6 | Recap |
| 5 | October 13 | Columbus | 2–8 | Tampa Bay | | Bobrovsky | 19,092 | 3–2–0 | 6 | Recap |
| 6 | October 18 | Philadelphia | 3–6 | Columbus | | Bobrovsky | 13,492 | 4–2–0 | 8 | Recap |
| 7 | October 20 | Chicago | 4–1 | Columbus | | Bobrovsky | 17,005 | 4–3–0 | 8 | Recap |
| 8 | October 23 | Arizona | 4–1 | Columbus | | Bobrovsky | 11,458 | 4–4–0 | 8 | Recap |
| 9 | October 25 | Columbus | 7–4 | St. Louis | | Korpisalo | 17,068 | 5–4–0 | 10 | Recap |
| 10 | October 27 | Buffalo | 4–5 | Columbus | OT | Korpisalo | 15,642 | 6–4–0 | 12 | Recap |
| 11 | October 30 | Detroit | 5–3 | Columbus | | Bobrovsky | 14,288 | 6–5–0 | 12 | Recap |

November: 9–3–2 (home: 4–0–1; road: 5–3–1)
| # | Date | Visitor | Score | Home | OT | Decision | Attendance | Record | Pts | Recap |
|---|---|---|---|---|---|---|---|---|---|---|
| 12 | November 1 | Columbus | 4–1 | San Jose | | Bobrovsky | 15,879 | 7–5–0 | 14 | Recap |
| 13 | November 3 | Columbus | 1–4 | Los Angeles | | Bobrovsky | 18,230 | 7–6–0 | 14 | Recap |
| 14 | November 4 | Columbus | 2–3 | Anaheim | OT | Korpisalo | 16,727 | 7–6–1 | 15 | Recap |
| 15 | November 6 | Dallas | 1–4 | Columbus | | Bobrovsky | 14,159 | 8–6–1 | 17 | Recap |
| 16 | November 9 | Columbus | 2–1 | Washington | | Bobrovsky | 18,506 | 9–6–1 | 19 | Recap |
| 17 | November 10 | NY Rangers | 5–4 | Columbus | SO | Korpisalo | 18,384 | 9–6–2 | 20 | Recap |
| 18 | November 12 | Columbus | 2–1 | Dallas | | Bobrovsky | 17,543 | 10–6–2 | 22 | Recap |
| 19 | November 15 | Florida | 3–7 | Columbus | | Korpisalo | 14,872 | 11–6–2 | 24 | Recap |
| 20 | November 17 | Columbus | 4–1 | Carolina | | Bobrovsky | 13,040 | 12–6–2 | 26 | Recap |
| 21 | November 19 | Columbus | 2–4 | Toronto | | Bobrovsky | 19,134 | 12–7–2 | 26 | Recap |
| 22 | November 23 | Toronto | 2–4 | Columbus | | Bobrovsky | 18,656 | 13–7–2 | 28 | Recap |
| 23 | November 24 | Columbus | 2–4 | Pittsburgh | | Korpsialo | 18,602 | 13–8–2 | 28 | Recap |
| 24 | November 26 | Columbus | 7–5 | Detroit | | Bobrovsky | 17,510 | 14–8–2 | 30 | Recap |
| 25 | November 29 | Minnesota | 2–4 | Columbus | | Bobrovsky | 15,210 | 15–8–2 | 32 | Recap |

December: 8–5–1 (home: 4–4–1; road: 4–1–0)
| # | Date | Visitor | Score | Home | OT | Decision | Attendance | Record | Pts | Recap |
|---|---|---|---|---|---|---|---|---|---|---|
| 26 | December 1 | Columbus | 2–3 | NY Islanders | | Bobrovsky | 13,917 | 15–9–2 | 32 | Recap |
| 27 | December 4 | Calgary | 9–6 | Columbus | | Bobrovsky | 14,885 | 15–10–2 | 32 | Recap |
| 28 | December 6 | Columbus | 4–3 | Philadelphia | OT | Bobrovsky | 19,428 | 16–10–2 | 34 | Recap |
| 29 | December 8 | Washington | 4–0 | Columbus | | Bobrovsky | 18,501 | 16–11–2 | 34 | Recap |
| 30 | December 11 | Vancouver | 3–2 | Columbus | | Korpisalo | 14,689 | 16–12–2 | 34 | Recap |
| 31 | December 13 | Los Angeles | 1–4 | Columbus | | Bobrovsky | 15,087 | 17–12–2 | 36 | Recap |
| 32 | December 15 | Anaheim | 2–1 | Columbus | OT | Bobrovsky | 16,171 | 17–12–3 | 37 | Recap |
| 33 | December 17 | Vegas | 0–1 | Columbus | | Bobrovsky | 15,008 | 18–12–3 | 39 | Recap |
| 34 | December 20 | New Jersey | 1–2 | Columbus | | Bobrovsky | 15,595 | 19–12–3 | 41 | Recap |
| 35 | December 22 | Columbus | 4–3 | Philadelphia | | Bobrovsky | 19,311 | 20–12–3 | 43 | Recap |
| 36 | December 23 | Columbus | 3–0 | New Jersey | | Bobrovsky | 12,872 | 21–12–3 | 45 | Recap |
| 37 | December 27 | Columbus | 4–3 | NY Rangers | OT | Korpisalo | 18,006 | 22–12–3 | 47 | Recap |
| 38 | December 28 | Toronto | 4–2 | Columbus | | Bobrovsky | 18,963 | 22–13–3 | 47 | Recap |
| 39 | December 31 | Ottawa | 3–6 | Columbus | | Bobrovsky | 18,549 | 23–13–3 | 49 | Recap |

January: 5–6–0 (home: 3–2–0; road: 2–4–0)
| # | Date | Visitor | Score | Home | OT | Decision | Attendance | Record | Pts | Recap |
|---|---|---|---|---|---|---|---|---|---|---|
| 40 | January 4 | Columbus | 2–4 | Carolina | | Bobrovsky | 15,346 | 23–14–3 | 49 | Recap |
| 41 | January 5 | Columbus | 4–3 | Florida | OT | Bobrovsky | 15,213 | 24–14–3 | 51 | Recap |
| 42 | January 8 | Columbus | 0–4 | Tampa Bay | | Bobrovsky | 19,092 | 24–15–3 | 51 | Recap |
| 43 | January 10 | Nashville | 3–4 | Columbus | OT | Korpisalo | 17,065 | 25–15–3 | 53 | Recap |
| 44 | January 12 | Columbus | 2–1 | Washington | OT | Korpisalo | 18,506 | 26–15–3 | 55 | Recap |
| 45 | January 13 | NY Rangers | 5–7 | Columbus | | Bobrovsky | 17,417 | 27–15–3 | 57 | Recap |
| 46 | January 15 | New Jersey | 1–4 | Columbus | | Korpisalo | 16,377 | 28–15–3 | 59 | Recap |
| 47 | January 18 | Montreal | 4–1 | Columbus | | Korpisalo | 18,892 | 28–16–3 | 59 | Recap |
| 48 | January 19 | Columbus | 1–2 | Minnesota | | Bobrovsky | 19,054 | 28–17–3 | 59 | Recap |
| 49 | January 29 | Buffalo | 5–4 | Columbus | | Bobrovsky | 16,615 | 28–18–3 | 59 | Recap |
| 50 | January 31 | Columbus | 3–4 | Winnipeg | | Bobrovsky | 15,321 | 28–19–3 | 59 | Recap |

February: 8–5–0 (home: 3–4–0; road: 5–1–0)
| # | Date | Visitor | Score | Home | OT | Decision | Attendance | Record | Pts | Recap |
|---|---|---|---|---|---|---|---|---|---|---|
| 51 | February 2 | St. Louis | 4–2 | Columbus | | Korpisalo | 16,681 | 28–20–3 | 59 | Recap |
| 52 | February 5 | Columbus | 6–3 | Colorado | | Bobrovsky | 15,398 | 29–20–3 | 61 | Recap |
| 53 | February 7 | Columbus | 4–2 | Arizona | | Bobrovsky | 15,319 | 30–20–3 | 63 | Recap |
| 54 | February 9 | Columbus | 4–3 | Vegas | | Bobrovsky | 18,301 | 31–20–3 | 65 | Recap |
| 55 | February 12 | Washington | 0–3 | Columbus | | Bobrovsky | 15,701 | 32–20–3 | 67 | Recap |
| 56 | February 14 | NY Islanders | 3–0 | Columbus | | Bobrovsky | 16,531 | 32–21–3 | 67 | Recap |
| 57 | February 16 | Columbus | 5–2 | Chicago | | Bobrovsky | 22,196 | 33–21–3 | 69 | Recap |
| 58 | February 18 | Tampa Bay | 5–1 | Columbus | | Korpisalo | 16,411 | 33–22–3 | 69 | Recap |
| 59 | February 19 | Columbus | 2–3 | Montreal | | Bobrovsky | 20,858 | 33–23–3 | 69 | Recap |
| 60 | February 22 | Columbus | 3–0 | Ottawa | | Bobrovsky | 13,918 | 34–23–3 | 71 | Recap |
| 61 | February 23 | San Jose | 0–4 | Columbus | | Bobrovsky | 19,025 | 35–23–3 | 73 | Recap |
| 62 | February 26 | Pittsburgh | 5–2 | Columbus | | Bobrovsky | 18,776 | 35–24–3 | 73 | Recap |
| 63 | February 28 | Philadelphia | 3–4 | Columbus | OT | Bobrovsky | 17,169 | 36–24–3 | 75 | Recap |

March: 9–6–1 (home: 5–2–0; road: 4–4–1)
| # | Date | Visitor | Score | Home | OT | Decision | Attendance | Record | Pts | Recap |
|---|---|---|---|---|---|---|---|---|---|---|
| 64 | March 2 | Edmonton | 4–0 | Columbus | | Bobrovsky | 18,628 | 36–25–3 | 75 | Recap |
| 65 | March 3 | Winnipeg | 5–2 | Columbus | | Bobrovsky | 16,091 | 36–26–3 | 75 | Recap |
| 66 | March 5 | Columbus | 2–1 | New Jersey | SO | Bobrovsky | 12,085 | 37–26–3 | 77 | Recap |
| 67 | March 7 | Columbus | 0–3 | Pittsburgh | | Korpisalo | 18,611 | 37–27–3 | 77 | Recap |
| 68 | March 9 | Pittsburgh | 1–4 | Columbus | | Bobrovsky | 19,146 | 38–27–3 | 79 | Recap |
| 69 | March 11 | Columbus | 0–2 | NY Islanders | | Bobrovsky | 11,827 | 38–28–3 | 79 | Recap |
| 70 | March 12 | Boston | 4–7 | Columbus | | Bobrovsky | 16,554 | 39–28–3 | 81 | Recap |
| 71 | March 15 | Carolina | 0–3 | Columbus | | Bobrovsky | 18,832 | 40–28–3 | 83 | Recap |
| 72 | March 16 | Columbus | 1–2 | Boston | OT | Korpisalo | 17,565 | 40–28–4 | 84 | Recap |
| 73 | March 19 | Columbus | 2–4 | Calgary | | Bobrovsky | 18,288 | 40–29–4 | 84 | Recap |
| 74 | March 21 | Columbus | 1–4 | Edmonton | | Korpisalo | 18,347 | 40–30–4 | 84 | Recap |
| 75 | March 24 | Columbus | 5–0 | Vancouver | | Bobrovsky | 17,805 | 41–30–4 | 86 | Recap |
| 76 | March 26 | NY Islanders | 0–4 | Columbus | | Bobrovsky | 17,928 | 42–30–4 | 88 | Recap |
| 77 | March 28 | Montreal | 2–6 | Columbus | | Bobrovsky | 18,641 | 43–30–4 | 90 | Recap |
| 78 | March 30 | Columbus | 5–2 | Nashville | | Bobrovsky | 17,751 | 44–30–4 | 92 | Recap |
| 79 | March 31 | Columbus | 4–0 | Buffalo | | Bobrovsky | 17,990 | 45–30–4 | 94 | Recap |

April: 2–1–0 (home: 0–1–0; road: 2–0–0)
| # | Date | Visitor | Score | Home | OT | Decision | Attendance | Record | Pts | Recap |
|---|---|---|---|---|---|---|---|---|---|---|
| 80 | April 2 | Boston | 6–2 | Columbus | | Bobrovsky | 18,890 | 45–31–4 | 94 | Recap |
| 81 | April 5 | Columbus | 3–2 | NY Rangers | SO | Bobrovsky | 17,341 | 46–31–4 | 96 | Recap |
| 82 | April 6 | Columbus | 6–2 | Ottawa | | Korpisalo | 18,425 | 47–31–4 | 98 | Recap |

Legend: Win (2 points) Loss (0 points) Overtime/shootout loss (1 point)

=== Playoffs ===
The Blue Jackets faced the Tampa Bay Lightning in the first round of the playoffs, and swept the series in four games, marking the first time in franchise history the team won a playoff series.

The Blue Jackets faced the Boston Bruins in the Second Round of the playoffs, where they fell to the Bruins in six games.

2019 Stanley Cup playoffs

Eastern Conference first round vs. (A1) Tampa Bay Lightning: Columbus won 4–0
| # | Date | Visitor | Score | Home | OT | Decision | Attendance | Series | Recap |
|---|---|---|---|---|---|---|---|---|---|
| 1 | April 10 | Columbus | 4–3 | Tampa Bay | | Bobrovsky | 19,092 | 1–0 | Recap |
| 2 | April 12 | Columbus | 5–1 | Tampa Bay | | Bobrovsky | 19,092 | 2–0 | Recap |
| 3 | April 14 | Tampa Bay | 1–3 | Columbus | | Bobrovsky | 19,224 | 3–0 | Recap |
| 4 | April 16 | Tampa Bay | 3–7 | Columbus | | Bobrovsky | 19,328 | 4–0 | Recap |

Eastern Conference second round vs. (A2) Boston Bruins: Boston won 4–2
| # | Date | Visitor | Score | Home | OT | Decision | Attendance | Series | Recap |
|---|---|---|---|---|---|---|---|---|---|
| 1 | April 25 | Columbus | 2–3 | Boston | OT | Bobrovsky | 17,565 | 0–1 | Recap |
| 2 | April 27 | Columbus | 3–2 | Boston | 2OT | Bobrovsky | 17,565 | 1–1 | Recap |
| 3 | April 30 | Boston | 1–2 | Columbus | | Bobrovsky | 19,337 | 2–1 | Recap |
| 4 | May 2 | Boston | 4–1 | Columbus | | Bobrovsky | 19,431 | 2–2 | Recap |
| 5 | May 4 | Columbus | 3–4 | Boston | | Bobrovsky | 17,565 | 2–3 | Recap |
| 6 | May 6 | Boston | 3–0 | Columbus | | Bobrovsky | 19,219 | 2–4 | Recap |

Legend: Win Loss

== Player statistics ==
As of May 6, 2019

=== Skaters ===
Regular season
| Player | GP | G | A | Pts | +/− | PIM |
|---|---|---|---|---|---|---|
| Artemi Panarin | 79 | 28 | 59 | 87 | 14 | 23 |
| Cam Atkinson | 80 | 41 | 28 | 69 | 3 | 20 |
| Pierre-Luc Dubois | 82 | 27 | 34 | 61 | 16 | 64 |
| Josh Anderson | 82 | 27 | 20 | 47 | 25 | 60 |
| Seth Jones | 75 | 9 | 37 | 46 | 1 | 28 |
| Zach Werenski | 82 | 11 | 33 | 44 | −12 | 18 |
| Boone Jenner | 77 | 16 | 22 | 38 | 6 | 42 |
| Oliver Bjorkstrand | 77 | 23 | 13 | 36 | 8 | 8 |
| Nick Foligno | 73 | 17 | 18 | 35 | 12 | 44 |
| Ryan Murray | 56 | 1 | 28 | 29 | 20 | 10 |
| Alexander Wennberg | 75 | 2 | 23 | 25 | −1 | 12 |
| David Savard | 82 | 8 | 16 | 24 | 19 | 36 |
| Markus Nutivaara | 80 | 5 | 16 | 21 | 3 | 6 |
| Anthony Duclair^{‡} | 53 | 11 | 8 | 19 | −3 | 12 |
| Scott Harrington | 73 | 2 | 15 | 17 | 6 | 23 |
| Brandon Dubinsky | 61 | 6 | 8 | 14 | −16 | 36 |
| Matt Duchene^{†} | 23 | 4 | 8 | 12 | −1 | 2 |
| Ryan Dzingel^{†} | 21 | 4 | 8 | 12 | 4 | 0 |
| Riley Nash | 78 | 3 | 9 | 12 | −8 | 19 |
| Markus Hannikainen | 44 | 4 | 3 | 7 | −5 | 2 |
| Lukas Sedlak | 47 | 4 | 2 | 6 | −5 | 10 |
| Dean Kukan | 25 | 0 | 5 | 5 | 6 | 6 |
| Adam McQuaid^{†} | 14 | 1 | 1 | 2 | −1 | 9 |
| Alexandre Texier | 2 | 1 | 0 | 1 | 3 | 0 |
| Sonny Milano | 8 | 1 | 0 | 1 | 0 | 0 |
| Zac Dalpe | 1 | 0 | 1 | 1 | 1 | 0 |
| Mark Letestu | 2 | 0 | 0 | 0 | −1 | 0 |
| Kole Sherwood | 2 | 0 | 0 | 0 | 0 | 0 |
| Gabriel Carlsson | 1 | 0 | 0 | 0 | −1 | 2 |
| Adam Clendening | 4 | 0 | 0 | 0 | 1 | 0 |
| Kevin Stenlund | 4 | 0 | 0 | 0 | 0 | 4 |
| Eric Robinson | 13 | 0 | 0 | 0 | −4 | 0 |

Playoffs
| Player | GP | G | A | Pts | +/− | PIM |
|---|---|---|---|---|---|---|
| Artemi Panarin | 10 | 5 | 6 | 11 | 0 | 0 |
| Matt Duchene | 10 | 5 | 5 | 10 | 4 | 0 |
| Seth Jones | 10 | 3 | 6 | 9 | 0 | 0 |
| Cam Atkinson | 10 | 2 | 6 | 8 | 2 | 4 |
| Zach Werenski | 10 | 1 | 5 | 6 | 3 | 9 |
| Oliver Bjorkstrand | 10 | 2 | 3 | 5 | −1 | 0 |
| Pierre-Luc Dubois | 10 | 2 | 3 | 5 | −5 | 14 |
| Scott Harrington | 10 | 0 | 4 | 4 | 4 | 2 |
| Alexandre Texier | 8 | 2 | 1 | 3 | −2 | 2 |
| Riley Nash | 7 | 1 | 2 | 3 | 2 | 4 |
| Josh Anderson | 10 | 1 | 2 | 3 | −5 | 22 |
| David Savard | 10 | 1 | 2 | 3 | −1 | 4 |
| Boone Jenner | 10 | 1 | 2 | 3 | 1 | 2 |
| Nick Foligno | 10 | 1 | 2 | 3 | 2 | 4 |
| Ryan Dzingel | 9 | 1 | 0 | 1 | 3 | 2 |
| Brandon Dubinsky | 10 | 1 | 0 | 1 | 0 | 6 |
| Dean Kukan | 10 | 1 | 0 | 1 | −2 | 2 |
| Adam Clendening | 7 | 0 | 1 | 1 | 1 | 2 |
| Alexander Wennberg | 4 | 0 | 0 | 0 | 0 | 0 |
| Markus Nutivaara | 2 | 0 | 0 | 0 | 1 | 0 |
| Vladislav Gavrikov | 2 | 0 | 0 | 0 | −2 | 0 |
| Markus Hannikainen | 1 | 0 | 0 | 0 | −1 | 0 |

=== Goaltenders ===
Regular season
| Player | GP | GS | TOI | W | L | OT | GA | GAA | SA | SV% | SO | G | A | PIM |
|---|---|---|---|---|---|---|---|---|---|---|---|---|---|---|
| Sergei Bobrovsky | 62 | 61 | 3,556:40 | 37 | 24 | 1 | 153 | 2.58 | 1,756 | .913 | 9 | 0 | 0 | 2 |
| Joonas Korpisalo | 27 | 21 | 1,360:34 | 10 | 7 | 3 | 67 | 2.95 | 651 | .897 | 0 | 0 | 0 | 0 |

Playoffs
| Player | GP | GS | TOI | W | L | GA | GAA | SA | SV% | SO | G | A | PIM |
|---|---|---|---|---|---|---|---|---|---|---|---|---|---|
| Sergei Bobrovsky | 10 | 10 | 622:56 | 6 | 4 | 25 | 2.41 | 333 | .925 | 0 | 0 | 0 | 0 |

^{†}Denotes player spent time with another team before joining the Blue Jackets. Stats reflect time with the Blue Jackets only.
^{‡}Denotes player was traded mid-season. Stats reflect time with the Blue Jackets only.
Bold/italics denotes franchise record.

== Transactions ==
The Blue Jackets have been involved in the following transactions during the 2018–19 season.

=== Trades ===
| Date | Details | | Ref |
|---|---|---|---|
| June 23, 2018 | To Detroit Red Wings 5th-round pick in 2019 | To Columbus Blue Jackets MTL's 6th-round pick in 2018 | |
| June 27, 2018 | To Chicago Blackhawks Jordan Schroeder | To Columbus Blue Jackets Jean-Francois Berube | |
| July 18, 2018 | To Arizona Coyotes Jacob Graves; Conditional 6th-round pick in 2019 | To Columbus Blue Jackets Ryan MacInnis | |
| February 11, 2019 | To Pittsburgh Penguins Blake Siebenaler | To Columbus Blue Jackets Conditional 7th-round pick in 2019 | |
| February 22, 2019 | To Ottawa Senators Vitalii Abramov; Jonathan Davidsson; Conditional 1st-round pick in 2019; Conditional 1st-round pick in 2020 | To Columbus Blue Jackets Julius Bergman; Matt Duchene | |
| February 23, 2019 | To Ottawa Senators Anthony Duclair; 2nd-round pick in 2020; 2nd-round pick in 2021 | To Columbus Blue Jackets Ryan Dzingel; CGY's 7th-round pick in 2019 | |
| February 25, 2019 | To New Jersey Devils 5th-round pick in 2022 | To Columbus Blue Jackets Keith Kinkaid | |
| February 25, 2019 | To New York Rangers Julius Bergman; 4th-round pick in 2019; 7th-round pick in 2019 | To Columbus Blue Jackets Adam McQuaid | |
| February 25, 2019 | To Winnipeg Jets Alex Broadhurst | To Columbus Blue Jackets Future considerations | |

=== Free agents ===
| Date | Player | Team | Contract term | Ref |
|---|---|---|---|---|
| July 1, 2018 | Matt Calvert | to Colorado Avalanche | 3-year | |
| July 1, 2018 | Adam Clendening | from Chicago Blackhawks | 1-year | |
| July 1, 2018 | Ian Cole | to Colorado Avalanche | 3-year | |
| July 1, 2018 | Tommy Cross | from Boston Bruins | 1-year | |
| July 1, 2018 | Cameron Gaunce | to Tampa Bay Lightning | 1-year | |
| July 1, 2018 | Jack Johnson | to Pittsburgh Penguins | 5-year | |
| July 1, 2018 | Riley Nash | from Boston Bruins | 3-year | |
| July 1, 2018 | Dillon Simpson | from Edmonton Oilers | 2-year | |
| July 1, 2018 | Thomas Vanek | to Detroit Red Wings | 1-year | |
| July 5, 2018 | Anthony Duclair | from Chicago Blackhawks | 1-year | |
| July 6, 2018 | Jeff Zatkoff | to Straubing Tigers (DEL) | Unknown | |
| July 7, 2018 | Taylor Chorney | to Lugano (NL) | 1-year | |
| September 27, 2018 | Michael Prapavessis | from RPI Engineers (ECAC) | 2-year | |
| June 15, 2019 | Jakob Lilja | from Djurgårdens IF (SHL) | 1-year | |

=== Waivers ===
| Date | Player | Team | Ref |

=== Contract terminations ===
| Date | Player | Via | Ref |

=== Retirement ===
| Date | Player | Ref |

=== Signings ===
| Date | Player | Contract term | Ref |
|---|---|---|---|
| July 5, 2018 | Boone Jenner | 4-year | |
| July 14, 2018 | Ryan Murray | 1-year | |
| July 15, 2018 | Oliver Bjorkstrand | 3-year | |
| July 30, 2018 | Liam Foudy | 3-year | |
| September 27, 2018 | Mark Letestu | 1-year | |
| February 27, 2019 | Zac Dalpe | 2-year | |
| March 15, 2019 | Trey Fix-Wolansky | 3-year | |
| March 20, 2019 | Elvis Merzlikins | 1-year | |
| April 1, 2019 | Andrew Peeke | 3-year | |
| April 13, 2019 | Vladislav Gavrikov | 2-year | |
| May 4, 2019 | Daniil Tarasov | 3-year | |
| May 14, 2019 | Emil Bemstrom | 3-year | |
| May 15, 2019 | Elvis Merzlikins | 1-year | |
| June 4, 2019 | Veini Vehvilainen | 2-year | |
| June 15, 2019 | Markus Hannikainen | 1-year | |

== Draft picks ==
Below are the Columbus Blue Jackets' selections at the 2018 NHL entry draft, which was held on June 22 and 23, 2018, at the American Airlines Center in Dallas, Texas.

| Round | # | Player | Pos | Nationality | College/Junior/Club team (League) |
|---|---|---|---|---|---|
| 1 | 18 | Liam Foudy | C | Canada | London Knights (OHL) |
| 2 | 49 | Kirill Marchenko | LW | Russia | Mamonty Yugry (MHL) |
| 3 | 80 | Marcus Karlberg | RW | Sweden | Leksands IF J20 (SuperElit) |
| 6 | 159^{1} | Tim Berni | D | Switzerland | GCK Lions (NLB) |
| 6 | 173 | Veini Vehvilainen | G | Finland | Karpat (Liiga) |
| 7 | 204 | Trey Fix-Wolansky | RW | Canada | Edmonton Oil Kings (WHL) |

Notes:

1. The Detroit Red Wings' sixth-round pick went to the Columbus Blue Jackets as the result of a trade on June 23, 2018, that sent a sixth-round pick in 2019 to Detroit in exchange for this pick.
