= 2018–19 Minnesota Wild season =

Season of play of professional ice hockey team

2018–19 Minnesota Wild
- Division: 7th Central
- Conference: 11th Western
- 2018–19 record: 37–36–9
- Home record: 16–18–7
- Road record: 21–18–2
- Goals for: 211
- Goals against: 237

Team information
- General manager: Paul Fenton
- Coach: Bruce Boudreau
- Captain: Mikko Koivu
- Alternate captains: Zach Parise; Ryan Suter
- Arena: Xcel Energy Center
- Average attendance: 18,907
- Minor league affiliates: Iowa Wild (AHL); Allen Americans (ECHL)

Team leaders
- Goals: Zach Parise (28)
- Assists: Ryan Suter (40)
- Points: Zach Parise (61)
- Penalty minutes: Nick Seeler (64)
- Plus/minus: Matt Bartkowski (+2)
- Wins: Devan Dubnyk (31)
- Goals against average: Devan Dubnyk (2.54)

The 2018–19 Minnesota Wild season was the 19th season for the National Hockey League (NHL) franchise that was established on June 25, 1997. On April 2, 2019, the Wild were eliminated from playoff contention after the Colorado Avalanche's 6–2 victory against the Edmonton Oilers, marking the first time the Wild missed the postseason since the 2011–12 season.

== Standings ==
Central Division
Pos	Team	GP	W	L	OTL	ROW	GF	GA	GD	Pts
1	y – Nashville Predators	82	47	29	6	43	240	214	+26	100
2	x – Winnipeg Jets	82	47	30	5	45	272	244	+28	99
3	x – St. Louis Blues	82	45	28	9	42	247	223	+24	99
4	x – Dallas Stars	82	43	32	7	42	210	202	+8	93
5	x – Colorado Avalanche	82	38	30	14	36	260	246	+14	90
6	Chicago Blackhawks	82	36	34	12	33	270	292	−22	84
7	Minnesota Wild	82	37	36	9	36	211	237	−26	83

Source: National Hockey League
x – Clinched playoff spot; y – Clinched division

Western Conference Wild Card
Pos	Div	Team	GP	W	L	OTL	ROW	GF	GA	GD	Pts
1	CE	x – Dallas Stars	82	43	32	7	42	210	202	+8	93
2	CE	x – Colorado Avalanche	82	38	30	14	36	260	246	+14	90
3	PA	Arizona Coyotes	82	39	35	8	35	213	223	−10	86
4	CE	Chicago Blackhawks	82	36	34	12	33	270	292	−22	84
5	CE	Minnesota Wild	82	37	36	9	36	211	237	−26	83
6	PA	Vancouver Canucks	82	35	36	11	29	225	254	−29	81
7	PA	Anaheim Ducks	82	35	37	10	32	199	251	−52	80
8	PA	Edmonton Oilers	82	35	38	9	32	232	274	−42	79
9	PA	Los Angeles Kings	82	31	42	9	28	202	263	−61	71

Source: National Hockey League
x – Clinched playoff spot

== Schedule and results ==
=== Preseason ===
The preseason schedule was published on June 13, 2018.

2018 preseason game log: 2–4–1 (Home: 2–2–0; Road: 0–2–1)
#	Date	Visitor	Score	Home	OT	Decision	Attendance	Record	Recap
1	September 17	Minnesota	1–2	Winnipeg		Hammond	15,321	0–1–0
2^{[a]}	September 19	St. Louis	3–2	Minnesota		Stalock	—	0–2–0
3	September 20	Dallas	3–1	Minnesota		Dubnyk	16,117	0–3–0
4	September 22	Colorado	0–7	Minnesota		Stalock	18,410	1–3–0
5	September 24	Minnesota	3–5	Dallas		Dubnyk	11,332	1–4–0
6	September 26	Winnipeg	3–4	Minnesota		Dubnyk	16,921	2–4–0
7	September 28	Minnesota	3–4	Colorado	OT	Hammond	—	2–4–1
Notes:^{a} Game was played at Wells Fargo Arena in Des Moines, Iowa.

=== Regular season ===
The regular season schedule was released on June 21, 2018.

2018–19 game log: 37–36–9 (Home: 16–18–7; Away: 21–18–2)

October: 7–3–2 (Home: 5–0–2; Road: 2–3–0)
#	Date	Visitor	Score	Home	OT	Decision	Attendance	Record	Pts	Recap
1	October 4	Minnesota	1–4	Colorado		Dubnyk	18,086	0–1–0	0
2	October 6	Vegas	2–1	Minnesota	SO	Dubnyk	19,077	0–1–1	1
3	October 11	Chicago	3–4	Minnesota	OT	Dubnyk	18,652	1–1–1	3
4	October 13	Carolina	5–4	Minnesota	OT	Dubnyk	18,715	1–1–2	4
5	October 15	Minnesota	2–4	Nashville		Stalock	17,165	1–2–2	4
6	October 16	Arizona	1–2	Minnesota		Dubnyk	18,795	2–2–2	6
7	October 19	Minnesota	3–1	Dallas		Dubnyk	18,346	3–2–2	8
8	October 20	Tampa Bay	4–5	Minnesota	OT	Stalock	19,080	4–2–2	10
9	October 25	Los Angeles	1–4	Minnesota		Dubnyk	18,778	5–2–2	12
10	October 27	Colorado	2–3	Minnesota		Dubnyk	19,093	6–2–2	14
11	October 29	Minnesota	2–5	Vancouver		Dubnyk	16,546	6–3–2	14
12	October 30	Minnesota	4–3	Edmonton		Stalock	18,347	7–3–2	16

November: 7–6–0 (Home: 3–3–0; Road: 4–3–0)
#	Date	Visitor	Score	Home	OT	Decision	Attendance	Record	Pts	Recap
13	November 3	Minnesota	5–1	St. Louis		Dubnyk	17,767	8–3–2	18
14	November 6	Minnesota	3–4	San Jose		Dubnyk	15,853	8–4–2	18
15	November 8	Minnesota	3–1	Los Angeles		Dubnyk	17,621	9–4–2	20
16	November 9	Minnesota	5–1	Anaheim		Stalock	16,464	10–4–2	22
17	November 11	Minnesota	3–2	St. Louis		Dubnyk	16,735	11–4–2	24
18	November 13	Washington	5–2	Minnesota		Dubnyk	19,101	11–5–2	24
19	November 15	Vancouver	2–6	Minnesota		Dubnyk	19,014	12–5–2	26
20	November 17	Buffalo	3–2	Minnesota		Dubnyk	18,947	12–6–2	26
21	November 18	Minnesota	1–3	Chicago		Stalock	21,373	12–7–2	26
22	November 21	Ottawa	4–6	Minnesota		Stalock	19,035	13–7–2	28
23	November 23	Winnipeg	2–4	Minnesota		Stalock	19,116	14–7–2	30
24	November 27	Arizona	4–3	Minnesota		Dubnyk	18,706	14–8–2	30
25	November 29	Minnesota	2–4	Columbus		Dubnyk	15,210	14–9–2	30

December: 4–8–1 (Home: 2–4–1; Road: 2–4–0)
#	Date	Visitor	Score	Home	OT	Decision	Attendance	Record	Pts	Recap
26	December 1	Toronto	5–3	Minnesota		Dubnyk	19,107	14–10–2	30
27	December 4	Minnesota	3–2	Vancouver		Dubnyk	17,122	15–10–2	32
28	December 6	Minnesota	0–2	Calgary		Stalock	17,690	15–11–2	32
29	December 7	Minnesota	2–7	Edmonton		Dubnyk	18,347	15–12–2	32
30	December 11	Montreal	1–7	Minnesota		Dubnyk	18,681	16–12–2	34
31	December 13	Florida	1–5	Minnesota		Dubnyk	18,714	17–12–2	36
32	December 15	Calgary	2–1	Minnesota		Dubnyk	18,882	17–13–2	36
33	December 18	San Jose	4–0	Minnesota		Dubnyk	18,870	17–14–2	36
34	December 20	Minnesota	1–2	Pittsburgh		Dubnyk	18,435	17–15–2	36
35	December 22	Dallas	2–1	Minnesota	OT	Dubnyk	19,074	17–15–3	37
36	December 27	Minnesota	2–5	Chicago		Dubnyk	21,735	17–16–3	37
37	December 29	Minnesota	3–1	Winnipeg		Dubnyk	15,321	18–16–3	39
38	December 31	Pittsburgh	3–2	Minnesota		Dubnyk	19,163	18–17–3	39

January: 8–4–0 (Home: 3–2–0; Road: 5–2–0)
#	Date	Visitor	Score	Home	OT	Decision	Attendance	Record	Pts	Recap
39	January 3	Minnesota	4–3	Toronto		Dubnyk	19,244	19–17–3	41
40	January 5	Minnesota	4–3	Ottawa		Dubnyk	14,124	20–17–3	43
41	January 7	Minnesota	1–0	Montreal		Dubnyk	20,601	21–17–3	45
42	January 8	Minnesota	0–4	Boston		Stalock	17,565	21–18–3	45
43	January 10	Winnipeg	2–3	Minnesota		Dubnyk	19,072	22–18–3	47
44	January 12	Detroit	5–2	Minnesota		Dubnyk	19,087	22–19–3	47
45	January 14	Minnesota	4–7	Philadelphia		Dubnyk	19,123	22–20–3	47
46	January 15	Los Angeles	2–3	Minnesota	SO	Stalock	19,017	23–20–3	49
47	January 17	Anaheim	3–0	Minnesota		Stalock	18,907	23–21–3	49
48	January 19	Columbus	1–2	Minnesota		Dubnyk	19,054	24–21–3	51
49	January 21	Minnesota	4–2	Vegas		Dubnyk	18,328	25–21–3	53
50	January 23	Minnesota	5–2	Colorado		Dubnyk	17,310	26–21–3	55

February: 5–6–3 (Home: 1–4–2; Road: 4–2–1)
#	Date	Visitor	Score	Home	OT	Decision	Attendance	Record	Pts	Recap
51	February 1	Minnesota	1–3	Dallas		Dubnyk	18,124	26–22–3	55
52	February 2	Chicago	4–3	Minnesota	OT	Stalock	19,114	26–22–4	56
53	February 5	Minnesota	4–5	Buffalo	SO	Dubnyk	16,847	26–22–5	57
54	February 7	Edmonton	4–1	Minnesota		Dubnyk	18,904	26–23–5	57
55	February 9	Minnesota	4–2	New Jersey		Dubnyk	15,783	27–23–5	59
56	February 10	Minnesota	1–2	NY Islanders		Dubnyk	13,825	27–24–5	59
57	February 12	Philadelphia	5–4	Minnesota		Dubnyk	18,607	27–25–5	59
58	February 15	New Jersey	5–4	Minnesota	OT	Dubnyk	19,041	27–25–6	60
59	February 17	St. Louis	4–0	Minnesota		Stalock	19,102	27–26–6	60
60	February 19	Anaheim	4–0	Minnesota		Dubnyk	18,533	27–27–6	60
61	February 21	Minnesota	4–1	NY Rangers		Dubnyk	17,271	28–27–6	62
62	February 22	Minnesota	3–2	Detroit		Dubnyk	19,515	29–27–6	64
63	February 24	St. Louis	1–2	Minnesota	OT	Dubnyk	18,645	30–27–6	66
64	February 26	Minnesota	3–2	Winnipeg		Dubnyk	15,321	31–27–6	68

March: 5–7–3 (Home: 1–4–2; Road: 4–3–1)
#	Date	Visitor	Score	Home	OT	Decision	Attendance	Record	Pts	Recap
65	March 2	Minnesota	4–2	Calgary		Dubnyk	19,289	32–27–6	70
66	March 3	Nashville	3–2	Minnesota	SO	Stalock	18,885	32–27–7	71
67	March 5	Minnesota	4–5	Nashville	SO	Dubnyk	17,668	32–27–8	72
68	March 7	Minnesota	3–0	Tampa Bay		Dubnyk	19,092	33–27–8	74
69	March 8	Minnesota	2–6	Florida		Dubnyk	12,388	33–28–8	74
70	March 11	San Jose	3–0	Minnesota		Dubnyk	18,907	33–29–8	74
71	March 14	Dallas	4–1	Minnesota		Dubnyk	18,919	33–30–8	74
72	March 16	NY Rangers	2–5	Minnesota		Dubnyk	18,844	34–30–8	76
73	March 17	NY Islanders	3–2	Minnesota	OT	Stalock	18,696	34–30–9	77
74	March 19	Colorado	3–1	Minnesota		Dubnyk	18,785	34–31–9	77
75	March 22	Minnesota	2–1	Washington		Dubnyk	18,506	35–31–9	79
76	March 23	Minnesota	1–5	Carolina		Dubnyk	16,571	35–32–9	79
77	March 25	Nashville	1–0	Minnesota		Dubnyk	18,833	35–33–9	79
78	March 29	Minnesota	3–2	Vegas		Dubnyk	18,492	36–33–9	81
79	March 31	Minnesota	0–4	Arizona		Dubnyk	17,431	36–34–9	81

April: 1–2–0 (Home: 1–1–0; Road: 0–1–0)
#	Date	Visitor	Score	Home	OT	Decision	Attendance	Record	Pts	Recap
80	April 2	Winnipeg	1–5	Minnesota		Dubnyk	18,590	37–34–9	83
81	April 4	Boston	3–0	Minnesota		Stalock	19,074	37–35–9	83
82	April 6	Minnesota	0–3	Dallas		Stalock	18,532	37–36–9	83

Legend: Win (2 points) Loss (0 points) Overtime/shootout loss (1 point)

== Player statistics ==
As of April 6, 2019

=== Skaters ===
Regular season
Player	GP	G	A	Pts	+/−	PIM
Zach Parise	74	28	33	61	−2	26
Eric Staal	81	22	30	52	−7	34
Mikael Granlund^{‡}	63	15	34	49	−2	20
Ryan Suter	82	7	40	47	−8	41
Jared Spurgeon	82	14	29	43	−1	20
Jason Zucker	81	21	21	42	−9	28
Mikko Koivu	48	8	21	29	−2	22
Charlie Coyle^{‡}	60	10	18	28	1	16
Jordan Greenway	81	12	12	24	−12	29
Nino Niederreiter^{‡}	46	9	14	23	−11	10
Mathew Dumba	32	12	10	22	−5	21
Marcus Foligno	82	7	12	19	−1	55
Jonas Brodin	82	4	14	18	−15	30
Luke Kunin	49	6	11	17	−9	27
Ryan Donato^{†}	22	4	12	16	−4	4
Eric Fehr	72	7	8	15	−8	30
Joel Eriksson Ek	58	7	7	14	−7	20
J. T. Brown	56	3	5	8	0	29
Kevin Fiala^{†}	19	3	4	7	−12	10
Nick Seeler	71	2	5	7	−4	64
Greg Pateryn	80	1	6	7	−11	41
Pontus Aberg^{†}	22	1	5	6	−4	6
Brad Hunt	29	3	2	5	−5	6
Victor Rask^{†}	23	2	1	3	−1	4
Matt Hendricks^{‡}	22	0	2	2	−2	19
Matt Bartkowski	2	1	0	1	2	0
Matt Read	12	1	0	1	−2	2
Kyle Rau	6	0	1	1	0	0
Ryan Murphy^{†}	2	0	0	0	1	0
Anthony Bitetto^{†}	18	0	0	0	−8	4
Nate Prosser	15	0	0	0	1	2
Louie Belpedio	2	0	0	0	0	0
Nico Sturm	2	0	0	0	0	0

=== Goaltenders ===
Regular season
Player	GP	GS	TOI	W	L	OT	GA	GAA	SA	SV%	SO	G	A	PIM
Devan Dubnyk	67	66	3,855:16	31	28	6	163	2.54	1,877	.913	2	0	2	2
Alex Stalock	21	16	1,065:06	6	8	3	53	2.99	525	.899	0	0	2	4

^{†}Denotes player spent time with another team before joining the Wild. Stats reflect time with the Wild only.
^{‡}Denotes player was traded mid-season. Stats reflect time with the Wild only.
Bold/italics denotes franchise record.

== Awards and honours ==
=== Milestones ===
Regular season
Player	Milestone	Reached
M. Granlund	400th career NHL game	October 6, 2018
J. Zucker	100th career NHL goal	October 13, 2018
E. Staal	1,100th career NHL game	October 19, 2018
R. Suter	500th career NHL point	October 19, 2018
R. Suter	1,000th career NHL game	October 25, 2018

== Transactions ==
The Wild have been involved in the following transactions during the 2018–19 season.

=== Trades ===
Date	Details		Ref
October 3, 2018	To Montreal Canadiens Gustav Olofsson	To Minnesota Wild William Bitten	
November 21, 2018	To Los Angeles Kings Pavel Jenys	To Minnesota Wild Stepan Falkovsky	
January 16, 2019	To Anaheim Ducks Justin Kloos	To Minnesota Wild Pontus Aberg	
January 17, 2019	To Carolina Hurricanes Nino Niederreiter	To Minnesota Wild Victor Rask	
January 21, 2019	To Vegas Golden Knights Conditional 5th-round pick in 2019	To Minnesota Wild Brad Hunt; 6th-round pick in 2019	
January 30, 2019	To New Jersey Devils Ryan Murphy	To Minnesota Wild Michael Kapla	
February 20, 2019	To Boston Bruins Charlie Coyle	To Minnesota Wild Ryan Donato; Conditional 5th-round pick in 2019	
February 25, 2019	To Nashville Predators Mikael Granlund	To Minnesota Wild Kevin Fiala	
February 25, 2019	To Winnipeg Jets Matt Hendricks	To Minnesota Wild 7th-round pick in 2020	
May 30, 2019	To Toronto Maple Leafs Conditional 7th-round pick in 2020	To Minnesota Wild Fedor Gordeev	

=== Free agents ===
Date	Player	Team	Contract term	Ref
June 29, 2018	Steve Michalek	to Red Bull Salzburg (EBEL)	Unknown	
July 1, 2018	Matt Bartkowski	from Calgary Flames	1-year	
July 1, 2018	J. T. Brown	from Anaheim Ducks	2-year	
July 1, 2018	Matt Cullen	to Pittsburgh Penguins	1-year	
July 1, 2018	Eric Fehr	from San Jose Sharks	1-year	
July 1, 2018	Kurtis Gabriel	to New Jersey Devils	1-year	
July 1, 2018	Andrew Hammond	from Colorado Avalanche	1-year	
July 1, 2018	Matt Hendricks	from Winnipeg Jets	1-year	
July 1, 2018	Mike Liambas	from Anaheim Ducks	2-year	
July 1, 2018	Greg Pateryn	from Dallas Stars	3-year	
July 6, 2018	Tyler Ennis	to Toronto Maple Leafs	1-year	
July 14, 2018	Zack Mitchell	to Los Angeles Kings	1-year	
July 19, 2018	Pat Cannone	to ERC Ingolstadt (DEL)	1-year	
July 30, 2018	Matt Read	from Philadelphia Flyers	1-year	
August 7, 2018	Dylan Labbe	to Wichita Thunder (ECHL)	1-year	
August 28, 2018	Kyle Quincey	to HIFK (Liiga)	1-year	
August 31, 2018	Zach Palmquist	to Lehigh Valley Phantoms (AHL)	1-year	
November 1, 2018	Colton Beck	from Iowa Wild (AHL)	2-year	
March 18, 2019	Mat Robson	from Minnesota Golden Gophers (Big Ten)	2-year	
April 1, 2019	Nico Sturm	from Clarkson Golden Knights (ECAC Hockey)	1-year	
May 10, 2019	Gerald Mayhew	from Iowa Wild (AHL)	2-year	

=== Waivers ===
Date	Player	Team	Ref
January 25, 2019	Anthony Bitetto	from Nashville Predators	

=== Contract terminations ===
Date	Player	Via	Ref
June 30, 2018	Tyler Ennis	Buyout	
November 28, 2018	Eric Martinsson	Mutual termination	

=== Signings ===
Date	Player	Contract term	Ref
June 25, 2018	Ryan Murphy	1-year	
June 27, 2018	Kyle Rau	2-year	
July 1, 2018	Nick Seeler	3-year	
July 21, 2018	Matt Dumba	5-year	
July 25, 2018	Jason Zucker	5-year	
February 25, 2019	Eric Staal	2-year	
March 5, 2019	Connor Dewar	3-year	
March 19, 2019	Alexander Khovanov	3-year	
June 11, 2019	Matt Bartkowski	1-year	

== Draft picks ==
Below are the Minnesota Wild's selections at the 2018 NHL entry draft, which was held on June 22 and 23, 2018, at the American Airlines Center in Dallas, Texas.

Round	#	Player	Pos	Nationality	College/Junior/Club team (League)
1	24	Filip Johansson	D	Sweden	Leksands IF (Allsvenskan)
3	63^{1}	Jack McBain	C	Canada	Toronto Jr. Canadiens (OJHL)
3	86	Alexander Khovanov	C	Russia	Moncton Wildcats (QMJHL)
3	92^{2}	Connor Dewar	C	Canada	Everett Silvertips (WHL)
5	148	Simon Johansson	D	Sweden	Djurgårdens IF J20 (SuperElit)
5	155^{3}	Damien Giroux	C	Canada	Saginaw Spirit (OHL)
6	179	Shawn Boudrias	RW	Canada	Gatineau Olympiques (QMJHL)
7	210	Sam Hengtes	C	United States	Tri-City Storm (USHL)

Notes:

1. The Buffalo Sabres' third-round pick went to the Minnesota Wild as the result of a trade on June 30, 2017, that sent Jason Pominville, Marco Scandella and a fourth-round pick in 2018 to Buffalo in exchange for Tyler Ennis, Marcus Foligno and this pick.
2. The Vegas Golden Knights' third-round pick went to the Minnesota Wild as the result of a trade on June 21, 2017, that sent Alex Tuch to Vegas in exchange for this pick (being conditional at the time of the trade).
3. The Washington Capitals' fifth-round pick went to the Minnesota Wild as the result of a trade on June 14, 2017, that sent Tyler Graovac to Washington in exchange for this pick.
