= 2018–19 Anaheim Ducks season =

NHL team season

2018–19 Anaheim Ducks
- Division: 6th Pacific
- Conference: 13th Western
- 2018–19 record: 35–37–10
- Home record: 19–14–8
- Road record: 16–23–2
- Goals for: 199
- Goals against: 251

Team information
- General manager: Bob Murray
- Coach: Randy Carlyle (Oct. 3 – Feb. 10); Bob Murray (interim, Feb. 10 – Apr. 6)
- Captain: Ryan Getzlaf
- Alternate captains: Ryan Kesler; Corey Perry
- Arena: Honda Center
- Average attendance: 16,814
- Minor league affiliate: San Diego Gulls (AHL)

Team leaders
- Goals: Jakob Silfverberg (24)
- Assists: Ryan Getzlaf (34)
- Points: Ryan Getzlaf (48)
- Penalty minutes: Nick Ritchie (82)
- Plus/minus: Troy Terry (+8)
- Wins: John Gibson (26)
- Goals against average: Kevin Boyle (2.17)

The 2018–19 Anaheim Ducks season was the 26th season for the National Hockey League (NHL) franchise that was established on June 15, 1993. The Ducks began the season on the road, defeating their division rival, the San Jose Sharks, who swept the Ducks in the First Round of the 2018 playoffs.

On February 10, 2019, the Ducks fired head coach Randy Carlyle. He was temporarily replaced by interim coach Bob Murray. On March 26, 2019, the Ducks failed to make the playoffs for the first time since 2011–12.

== Standings ==
Pacific Division
Pos	Team	GP	W	L	OTL	ROW	GF	GA	GD	Pts
1	z – Calgary Flames	82	50	25	7	50	289	227	+62	107
2	x – San Jose Sharks	82	46	27	9	46	289	261	+28	101
3	x – Vegas Golden Knights	82	43	32	7	40	249	230	+19	93
4	Arizona Coyotes	82	39	35	8	35	213	223	−10	86
5	Vancouver Canucks	82	35	36	11	29	225	254	−29	81
6	Anaheim Ducks	82	35	37	10	32	199	251	−52	80
7	Edmonton Oilers	82	35	38	9	32	232	274	−42	79
8	Los Angeles Kings	82	31	42	9	28	202	263	−61	71

Source: National Hockey League
x – Clinched playoff spot; z – Clinched conference

Western Conference Wild Card
Pos	Div	Team	GP	W	L	OTL	ROW	GF	GA	GD	Pts
1	CE	x – Dallas Stars	82	43	32	7	42	210	202	+8	93
2	CE	x – Colorado Avalanche	82	38	30	14	36	260	246	+14	90
3	PA	Arizona Coyotes	82	39	35	8	35	213	223	−10	86
4	CE	Chicago Blackhawks	82	36	34	12	33	270	292	−22	84
5	CE	Minnesota Wild	82	37	36	9	36	211	237	−26	83
6	PA	Vancouver Canucks	82	35	36	11	29	225	254	−29	81
7	PA	Anaheim Ducks	82	35	37	10	32	199	251	−52	80
8	PA	Edmonton Oilers	82	35	38	9	32	232	274	−42	79
9	PA	Los Angeles Kings	82	31	42	9	28	202	263	−61	71

Source: National Hockey League
x – Clinched playoff spot

== Schedule and results ==
=== Preseason ===
The preseason schedule was published on June 21, 2018.

2018 preseason game log: 3–3–0 (Home: 2–1–0; Road: 1–2–0)
#	Date	Visitor	Score	Home	OT	Decision	Attendance	Record	Recap
1	September 18	Anaheim	1–4	San Jose		Coreau	—	0–1–0	L1
2	September 20	San Jose	7–3	Anaheim		Coreau	15,065	0–2–0	L2
3	September 22	Anaheim	1–6	Arizona		Miller	6,559	0–3–0	L3
4	September 24	Arizona	2–4	Anaheim		Gibson	13,834	1–3–0	W1
5	September 26	Los Angeles	4–7	Anaheim		Miller	14,841	2–3–0	W2
6	September 29	Anaheim	3–0	Los Angeles		Gibson	18,230	3–3–0	W3

=== Regular season ===
The regular season schedule was released on June 21, 2018.

2018–19 game log

October: 5–6–2 (Home: 2–2–2; Road: 3–4–0)
#	Date	Visitor	Score	Home	OT	Decision	Attendance	Record	Pts	Recap
1	October 3	Anaheim	5–2	San Jose		Gibson	17,562	1–0–0	2	W1
2	October 6	Anaheim	1–0	Arizona		Gibson	17,125	2–0–0	4	W2
3	October 8	Detroit	2–3	Anaheim	SO	Gibson	17,436	3–0–0	6	W3
4	October 10	Arizona	3–2	Anaheim	SO	Gibson	17,015	3–0–1	7	O1
5	October 13	Anaheim	3–5	Dallas		Gibson	18,532	3–1–1	7	L1
6	October 14	Anaheim	3–2	St. Louis		Miller	16,562	4–1–1	9	W1
7	October 17	NY Islanders	1–4	Anaheim		Gibson	16,909	5–1–1	11	W2
8	October 20	Anaheim	1–3	Vegas		Gibson	18,375	5–2–1	11	L1
9	October 21	Buffalo	4–2	Anaheim		Miller	17,174	5–3–1	11	L2
10	October 23	Anaheim	1–3	Chicago		Gibson	20,900	5–4–1	11	L3
11	October 25	Anaheim	2–5	Dallas		Gibson	17,134	5–5–1	11	L4
12	October 28	San Jose	4–3	Anaheim	OT	Gibson	17,099	5–5–2	12	O1
13	October 30	Philadelphia	3–2	Anaheim		Miller	16,450	5–6–2	12	L1

November: 8–4–3 (Home: 5–1–3; Road: 3–3–0)
#	Date	Visitor	Score	Home	OT	Decision	Attendance	Record	Pts	Recap
14	November 1	NY Rangers	3–2	Anaheim	SO	Gibson	16,101	5–6–3	13	O1
15	November 4	Columbus	2–3	Anaheim	OT	Gibson	16,727	6–6–3	15	W1
16	November 6	Anaheim	1–4	Los Angeles		Gibson	18,230	6–7–3	15	L1
17	November 7	Calgary	2–3	Anaheim		Miller	16,461	7–7–3	17	W1
18	November 9	Minnesota	5–1	Anaheim		Gibson	16,464	7–8–3	17	L1
19	November 12	Nashville	1–2	Anaheim	SO	Gibson	16,629	8–8–3	19	W1
20	November 14	Anaheim	0–5	Vegas		Gibson	18,111	8–9–3	19	L1
21	November 16	Toronto	2–1	Anaheim	OT	Gibson	16,666	8–9–4	20	O1
22	November 18	Colorado	4–3	Anaheim	OT	Miller	16,502	8–9–5	21	O2
23	November 21	Vancouver	3–4	Anaheim		Gibson	16,091	9–9–5	23	W1
24	November 23	Edmonton	1–2	Anaheim	OT	Gibson	16,497	10–9–5	25	W2
25	November 25	Anaheim	2–5	Nashville		Gibson	17,167	10–10–5	25	L1
26	November 27	Anaheim	3–1	Tampa Bay		Miller	19,092	11–10–5	27	W1
27	November 28	Anaheim	3–2	Florida		Gibson	9,078	12–10–5	29	W2
28	November 30	Anaheim	2–1	Carolina	OT	Gibson	13,987	13–10–5	31	W3

December: 6–5–2 (Home: 3–1–2; Road: 3–4–0)
#	Date	Visitor	Score	Home	OT	Decision	Attendance	Record	Pts	Recap
29	December 2	Anaheim	6–5	Washington		Miller	18,506	14–10–5	33	W4
30	December 5	Chicago	2–4	Anaheim		Gibson	15,696	15–10–5	35	W5
31	December 7	Carolina	4–1	Anaheim		Gibson	15,573	15–11–5	35	L1
32	December 9	New Jersey	5–6	Anaheim	SO	Gibson	16,470	16–11–5	37	W1
33	December 12	Dallas	3–6	Anaheim		Gibson	16,810	17–11–5	39	W2
34	December 15	Anaheim	2–1	Columbus	OT	Gibson	16,171	18–11–5	41	W3
35	December 17	Anaheim	4–2	Pittsburgh		Gibson	18,575	19–11–5	43	W4
36	December 18	Anaheim	1–3	NY Rangers		Johnson	17,590	19–12–5	43	L1
37	December 20	Anaheim	1–3	Boston		Gibson	17,565	19–13–5	43	L2
38	December 22	Anaheim	0–3	Buffalo		Gibson	19,070	19–14–5	43	L3
39	December 27	Anaheim	2–4	San Jose		Johnson	17,562	19–15–5	43	L4
40	December 29	Arizona	5–4	Anaheim	OT	Gibson	17,174	19–15–6	44	O1
41	December 31	Tampa Bay	2–1	Anaheim	OT	Gibson	17,340	19–15–7	45	O2

January: 2–6–2 (Home: 0–4–1; Road: 2–2–1)
#	Date	Visitor	Score	Home	OT	Decision	Attendance	Record	Pts	Recap
42	January 4	Vegas	3–2	Anaheim		Gibson	17,222	19–16–7	45	L1
43	January 6	Edmonton	4–0	Anaheim		Gibson	17,317	19–17–7	45	L2
44	January 9	Ottawa	2–1	Anaheim	OT	Gibson	17,174	19–17–8	46	O1
45	January 11	Pittsburgh	7–4	Anaheim		Gibson	17,473	19–18–8	46	L1
46	January 13	Anaheim	3–4	Winnipeg	OT	Gibson	15,321	19–18–9	47	O1
47	January 15	Anaheim	1–3	Detroit		Gibson	19,515	19–19–9	47	L1
48	January 17	Anaheim	3–0	Minnesota		Gibson	18,907	20–19–9	49	W1
49	January 19	Anaheim	3–2	New Jersey		Gibson	15,231	21–19–9	51	W2
50	January 20	Anaheim	0–3	NY Islanders		Johnson	13,917	21–20–9	51	L1
51	January 23	St. Louis	5–1	Anaheim		Gibson	16,795	21–21–9	51	L2

February: 3–10–0 (Home: 2–2–0; Road: 1–8–0)
#	Date	Visitor	Score	Home	OT	Decision	Attendance	Record	Pts	Recap
52	February 2	Anaheim	3–9	Winnipeg		Gibson	15,321	21–22–9	51	L3
53	February 4	Anaheim	1–6	Toronto		Gibson	18,858	21–23–9	51	L4
54	February 5	Anaheim	1–4	Montreal		Johnson	20,680	21–24–9	51	L5
55	February 7	Anaheim	0–4	Ottawa		Gibson	12,617	21–25–9	51	L6
56	February 9	Anaheim	2–6	Philadelphia		Johnson	19,072	21–26–9	51	L7
57	February 13	Vancouver	0–1	Anaheim		Boyle	17,174	22–26–9	53	W1
58	February 15	Boston	3–0	Anaheim		Boyle	17,174	22–27–9	53	L1
59	February 17	Washington	2–5	Anaheim		Miller	17,495	23–27–9	55	W1
60	February 19	Anaheim	4–0	Minnesota		Miller	18,533	24–27–9	57	W2
61	February 22	Anaheim	1–2	Calgary		Miller	18,960	24–28–9	57	L1
62	February 23	Anaheim	1–2	Edmonton		Boyle	18,347	24–29–9	57	L2
63	February 25	Anaheim	0–4	Vancouver		Boyle	18,542	24–30–9	57	L3
64	February 27	Chicago	4–3	Anaheim		Miller	16,689	24–31–9	57	L4

March: 9–6–1 (Home: 5–4–0; Road: 4–2–1)
#	Date	Visitor	Score	Home	OT	Decision	Attendance	Record	Pts	Recap
65	March 1	Vegas	3–0	Anaheim		Gibson	16,456	24–32–9	57	L5
66	March 3	Colorado	1–2	Anaheim		Gibson	16,690	25–32–9	59	W1
67	March 5	Anaheim	3–1	Arizona		Miller	11,305	26–32–9	61	W2
68	March 6	St. Louis	5–4	Anaheim		Gibson	16,854	26–33–9	61	L1
69	March 8	Montreal	2–8	Anaheim		Gibson	16,580	27–33–9	63	W1
70	March 10	Los Angeles	3–2	Anaheim		Miller	17,174	27–34–9	63	L1
71	March 12	Nashville	2–3	Anaheim		Gibson	16,811	28–34–9	65	W1
72	March 14	Anaheim	1–6	Arizona		Miller	14,202	28–35–9	65	L1
73	March 15	Anaheim	5–3	Colorado		Gibson	18,025	29–35–9	67	W1
74	March 17	Florida	2–3	Anaheim		Gibson	16,523	30–35–9	69	W2
75	March 20	Winnipeg	3–0	Anaheim		Gibson	16,846	30–36–9	69	L1
76	March 22	San Jose	3–4	Anaheim	OT	Gibson	17,174	31–36–9	71	W1
77	March 23	Anaheim	3–4	Los Angeles	SO	Miller	18,230	31–36–10	72	O1
78	March 26	Anaheim	5–4	Vancouver		Gibson	17,633	32–36–10	74	W1
79	March 29	Anaheim	1–6	Calgary		Miller	19,030	32–37–10	74	L1
80	March 30	Anaheim	5–1	Edmonton		Gibson	18,347	33–37–10	76	W1

April: 2–0–0 (Home: 2–0–0; Road: 0–0–0)
#	Date	Visitor	Score	Home	OT	Decision	Attendance	Record	Pts	Recap
81	April 3	Calgary	1–3	Anaheim		Miller	17,174	34–37–10	78	W2
82	April 5	Los Angeles	2–5	Anaheim		Gibson	17,306	35–37–10	80	W3

Legend: Win (2 points) Loss (0 points) Overtime/shootout loss (1 point)

== Player statistics ==
As of April 5, 2019

=== Skaters ===
Regular season
Player	GP	G	A	Pts	+/−	PIM
Ryan Getzlaf	67	14	34	48	−19	58
Jakob Silfverberg	73	24	19	43	−9	28
Rickard Rakell	69	18	25	43	−13	27
Adam Henrique	82	18	24	42	−5	24
Nick Ritchie	60	9	22	31	6	82
Hampus Lindholm	76	6	22	28	−5	44
Brandon Montour^{‡}	62	5	20	25	−16	40
Cam Fowler	59	5	18	23	−14	20
Ondrej Kase	30	11	9	20	0	2
Carter Rowney	62	7	13	20	0	12
Daniel Sprong^{†}	47	14	5	19	−9	10
Pontus Aberg^{†‡}	37	11	8	19	−10	14
Josh Manson	74	3	13	16	−8	62
Troy Terry	32	4	9	13	8	2
Kiefer Sherwood	50	6	6	12	1	8
Devin Shore^{†}	34	5	7	12	−12	6
Sam Steel	22	6	5	11	2	8
Andrew Cogliano^{‡}	46	3	8	11	2	14
Corey Perry	31	6	4	10	−16	27
Derek Grant^{†}	31	2	7	9	−9	8
Ryan Kesler	60	5	3	8	−19	44
Max Comtois	10	2	5	7	3	7
Marcus Pettersson^{‡}	27	0	6	6	4	17
Ben Street	21	3	2	5	−4	2
Max Jones	30	2	3	5	−1	14
Brian Gibbons	44	2	3	5	−8	16
Josh Mahura	17	1	4	5	0	4
Jacob Larsson	49	0	5	5	−4	16
Korbinian Holzer	22	1	3	4	5	8
Jaycob Megna	28	1	3	4	−1	12
Andy Welinski	26	1	3	4	−5	8
Michael Del Zotto^{†‡}	12	0	3	3	−3	0
Isac Lundestrom	15	0	2	2	−1	2
Kalle Kossila	8	1	0	1	−1	4
Brendan Guhle^{†}	6	0	1	1	−3	2
Sam Carrick	6	0	1	1	−1	2
Jake Dotchin	20	0	1	1	−4	39
Luke Schenn^{‡}	8	0	0	0	−6	7
Joseph Blandisi^{‡}	3	0	0	0	−1	6
Kevin Roy	3	0	0	0	−1	0
Patrick Eaves	7	0	0	0	−4	4
Adam Cracknell	2	0	0	0	−1	0
Chase De Leo	1	0	0	0	1	0
Justin Kloos	1	0	0	0	0	0
Andrej Sustr	5	0	0	0	0	6

=== Goaltenders ===
Regular season
Player	GP	GS	TOI	W	L	OT	GA	GAA	SA	SV%	SO	G	A	PIM
John Gibson	58	57	3,233:02	26	22	8	153	2.84	1,838	.917	2	0	0	2
Ryan Miller	20	17	1,108:48	8	7	2	51	2.76	578	.912	1	0	0	0
Kevin Boyle	5	4	276:51	1	3	0	10	2.17	139	.928	1	0	0	0
Chad Johnson^{†}	9	4	319:42	0	5	0	20	3.75	156	.872	0	0	0	0

^{†}Denotes player spent time with another team before joining the Ducks. Stats reflect time with the Ducks only.
^{‡}Denotes player was traded mid-season. Stats reflect time with the Ducks only.
Bold/italics denotes franchise record.

== Transactions ==
The Ducks have been involved in the following transactions during the 2018–19 season.

=== Trades ===
Date	Details		Ref
June 30, 2018	To Winnipeg Jets Nic Kerdiles	To Anaheim Ducks Chase De Leo	
October 18, 2018	To Tampa Bay Lightning Mitch Hults	To Anaheim Ducks Future considerations	
December 3, 2018	To Pittsburgh Penguins Marcus Pettersson	To Anaheim Ducks Daniel Sprong	
December 10, 2018	To Toronto Maple Leafs Steven Oleksy	To Anaheim Ducks Adam Cracknell	
December 28, 2018	To Arizona Coyotes Giovanni Fiore	To Anaheim Ducks Trevor Murphy	
January 3, 2019	To St. Louis Blues Jared Coreau	To Anaheim Ducks Future considerations	
January 14, 2019	To Dallas Stars Andrew Cogliano	To Anaheim Ducks Devin Shore	
January 16, 2019	To Minnesota Wild Pontus Aberg	To Anaheim Ducks Justin Kloos	
January 16, 2019	To Vancouver Canucks Luke Schenn; 7th-round pick in 2020	To Anaheim Ducks Michael Del Zotto	
January 17, 2019	To Pittsburgh Penguins Joseph Blandisi	To Anaheim Ducks Derek Grant	
February 24, 2019	To Buffalo Sabres Brandon Montour	To Anaheim Ducks Brendan Guhle; Conditional 1st-round pick in 2019	
February 25, 2019	To Ottawa Senators Brian Gibbons	To Anaheim Ducks Patrick Sieloff	
February 25, 2019	To St. Louis Blues Michael Del Zotto	To Anaheim Ducks 6th-round pick in 2019	

=== Free agents ===
Date	Player	Team	Contract term	Ref
July 1, 2018	J. T. Brown	to Minnesota Wild	2-year	
July 1, 2018	Mike Liambas	to Minnesota Wild	2-year	
July 2, 2018	Jared Coreau	from Detroit Red Wings	1-year	
July 2, 2018	Brian Gibbons	from New Jersey Devils	1-year	
July 2, 2018	Anton Rodin	from HC Davos (NL)	1-year	
July 2, 2018	Carter Rowney	from Pittsburgh Penguins	3-year	
July 2, 2018	Luke Schenn	from Arizona Coyotes	1-year	
July 2, 2018	Ben Street	from Detroit Red Wings	1-year	
July 5, 2018	Andrej Sustr	from Tampa Bay Lightning	1-year	
July 19, 2018	Derek Grant	to Pittsburgh Penguins	1-year	
July 23, 2018	Corey Tropp	to San Diego Gulls (AHL)	1-year	
October 17, 2018	Jake Dotchin	from Tampa Bay Lightning	1-year	
March 7, 2019	Simon Benoit	from San Diego Gulls (AHL)	3-year	
June 6, 2019	Trevor Murphy	to Kunlun Red Star (KHL)	2-year	
June 6, 2019	Andrej Sustr	to Kunlun Red Star (KHL)	1-year	

=== Waivers ===
Date	Player	Team	Ref
October 1, 2018	Pontus Aberg	from Edmonton Oilers	
December 11, 2018	Chad Johnson	from St. Louis Blues	

=== Contract terminations ===
Date	Player	Via	Ref
September 25, 2018	Julius Nattinen	Mutual termination	
September 30, 2018	Anton Rodin	Mutual termination	
June 19, 2019	Corey Perry	Buyout	

=== Retirement ===
Date	Player	Ref
April 18, 2018	Francois Beauchemin	
July 4, 2018	Jared Boll	
September 4, 2018	Chris Kelly	

=== Signings ===
Date	Player	Contract term	Ref
July 13, 2018	Chase De Leo	1-year	
July 16, 2018	Adam Henrique	5-year	
July 17, 2018	Kalle Kossila	1-year	
July 17, 2018	Kevin Roy	1-year	
July 17, 2018	Andy Welinski	1-year	
July 24, 2018	Brandon Montour	2-year	
August 4, 2018	John Gibson	8-year	
August 8, 2018	Isac Lundestrom	3-year	
August 15, 2018	Ondrej Kase	3-year	
October 17, 2018	Nick Ritchie	3-year	
March 1, 2019	Jakob Silfverberg	5-year	
May 13, 2019	Lukas Dostal	3-year	
June 20, 2019	Derek Grant	1-year	
June 20, 2019	Korbinian Holzer	1-year	
June 20, 2019	Ryan Miller	1-year	

== Draft picks ==
Below are the Anaheim Ducks' selections at the 2018 NHL entry draft, which was held on June 22 and 23, 2018, at the American Airlines Center in Dallas, Texas.

Round	#	Player	Pos	Nationality	College/Junior/Club team (League)
1	23	Isac Lundestrom	C	Sweden	Luleå HF (SHL)
2	54	Benoit-Olivier Groulx	C	Canada	Halifax Mooseheads (QMJHL)
3	79^{1}	Blake McLaughlin	LW	United States	Chicago Steel (USHL)
3	85	Lukas Dostal	G	Czech Republic	Horácká Slavia Třebíč (Czech 1.Liga)
4	116	Jack Perbix	RW	United States	Elk River High School (USHS)
5	147	Roman Durny	G	Slovakia	Des Moines Buccaneers (USHL)
6	178	Hunter Drew	D	Canada	Charlottetown Islanders (QMJHL)

=== Notes ===
1. The New Jersey Devils' third-round pick went to the Anaheim Ducks as the result of a trade on November 30, 2017, that sent Sami Vatanen and a conditional third-round pick in 2019 or 2020 to New Jersey in exchange for Adam Henrique, Joseph Blandisi and this pick.
