= 2018–19 Winnipeg Jets season =

Season of play of professional ice hockey team

2018–19 Winnipeg Jets
- Division: 2nd Central
- Conference: 4th Western
- 2018–19 record: 47–30–5
- Home record: 25–12–4
- Road record: 22–18–1
- Goals for: 272
- Goals against: 244

Team information
- General manager: Kevin Cheveldayoff
- Coach: Paul Maurice
- Captain: Blake Wheeler
- Alternate captains: Dustin Byfuglien; Mark Scheifele
- Arena: Bell MTS Place
- Average attendance: 15,276
- Minor league affiliates: Manitoba Moose (AHL); Jacksonville Icemen (ECHL)

Team leaders
- Goals: Mark Scheifele (38)
- Assists: Blake Wheeler (71)
- Points: Blake Wheeler (91)
- Penalty minutes: Dustin Byfuglien (69)
- Plus/minus: Andrew Copp (+20)
- Wins: Connor Hellebuyck (34)
- Goals against average: Laurent Brossoit (2.52)

The 2018–19 Winnipeg Jets season was the 36th season of play for the National Hockey League (NHL) franchise that was established on June 22, 1979, 44th season for the organization overall, and the eighth in Winnipeg since the franchise relocated from Atlanta prior to the start of the 2011–12 NHL season. The Jets clinched a playoff spot of March 23, 2019, after a 5–0 win against the Nashville Predators. The Jets faced the St. Louis Blues in the first round of the playoffs, where they lost to the eventual Stanley Cup champions in six games.

== Standings ==
Central Division
Pos	Team	GP	W	L	OTL	ROW	GF	GA	GD	Pts
1	y – Nashville Predators	82	47	29	6	43	240	214	+26	100
2	x – Winnipeg Jets	82	47	30	5	45	272	244	+28	99
3	x – St. Louis Blues	82	45	28	9	42	247	223	+24	99
4	x – Dallas Stars	82	43	32	7	42	210	202	+8	93
5	x – Colorado Avalanche	82	38	30	14	36	260	246	+14	90
6	Chicago Blackhawks	82	36	34	12	33	270	292	−22	84
7	Minnesota Wild	82	37	36	9	36	211	237	−26	83

Source: National Hockey League
x – Clinched playoff spot; y – Clinched division

== Schedule and results ==
=== Pre-season ===
The pre-season schedule was published on June 12, 2018.

2018 pre-season game log: 4–3–0 (Home: 3–1–0; Road: 1–2–0)
#	Date	Visitor	Score	Home	OT	Decision	Attendance	Record	Recap
1	September 17	Minnesota	1–2	Winnipeg		Brossoit	15,321	1–0–0
2	September 20	Winnipeg	3–7	Edmonton		Comrie	18,347	1–1–0
3	September 21	Calgary	3–4	Winnipeg	OT	Hellebuyck	15,321	2–1–0
4	September 23	Edmonton	3–5	Winnipeg		Hellebuyck	15,321	3–1–0
5	September 24	Winnipeg	5–4	Calgary	OT	Brossoit	17,207	4–1–0
6	September 26	Winnipeg	3–4	Minnesota		Brossoit	16,921	4–2–0
7	September 27	New Jersey	5–3	Winnipeg		Hellebuyck	15,321	4–3–0

=== Regular season ===
The regular season schedule was released on June 21, 2018.

2018–19 game log

October: 7–4–1 (Home: 5–1–1; Road: 2–3–0)
#	Date	Visitor	Score	Home	OT	Decision	Attendance	Record	Pts	Recap
1	October 4	Winnipeg	5–1	St. Louis		Hellebuyck	18,292	1–0–0	2
2	October 6	Winnipeg	1–5	Dallas		Hellebuyck	18,131	1–1–0	2
3	October 9	Los Angeles	1–2	Winnipeg		Hellebuyck	15,321	2–1–0	4
4	October 11	Winnipeg	0–3	Nashville		Hellebuyck	17,228	2–2–0	4
5	October 14	Carolina	1–3	Winnipeg		Brossoit	15,321	3–2–0	6
6	October 16	Edmonton	5–4	Winnipeg	OT	Hellebuyck	15,321	3–2–1	7
7	October 18	Vancouver	1–4	Winnipeg		Hellebuyck	15,321	4–2–1	9
8	October 20	Arizona	3–5	Winnipeg		Brossoit	15,321	5–2–1	11
9	October 22	St. Louis	4–5	Winnipeg	OT	Hellebuyck	15,321	6–2–1	13
10	October 24	Toronto	4–2	Winnipeg		Hellebuyck	15,321	6–3–1	13
11	October 26	Winnipeg	2–1	Detroit		Brossoit	19,515	7–3–1	15
12	October 27	Winnipeg	2–3	Toronto		Hellebuyck	19,545	7–4–1	15

November: 7–4–1 (Home: 4–2–1; Road: 3–2–0)
#	Date	Visitor	Score	Home	OT	Decision	Attendance	Record	Pts	Recap
13^{[a]}	November 1	Winnipeg	4–2	Florida		Hellebuyck	13,490	8–4–1	17
14^{[a]}	November 2	Florida	4–2	Winnipeg		Hellebuyck	13,490	8–5–1	17
15	November 9	Colorado	2–5	Winnipeg		Hellebuyck	15,321	9–5–1	19
16	November 11	New Jersey	2–5	Winnipeg		Hellebuyck	15,321	10–5–1	21
17	November 14	Washington	1–3	Winnipeg		Hellebuyck	15,321	11–5–1	23
18	November 16	Buffalo	2–1	Winnipeg	SO	Brossoit	15,321	11–5–2	24
19	November 19	Winnipeg	6–3	Vancouver		Hellebuyck	17,917	12–5–2	26
20	November 21	Winnipeg	3–6	Calgary		Brossoit	17,661	12–6–2	26
21	November 23	Winnipeg	2–4	Minnesota		Hellebuyck	19,116	12–7–2	26
22	November 24	Winnipeg	8–4	St. Louis		Brossoit	17,028	13–7–2	28
23	November 27	Pittsburgh	4–3	Winnipeg		Hellebuyck	15,321	13–8–2	28
24	November 29	Chicago	5–6	Winnipeg		Hellebuyck	15,321	14–8–2	30

December: 11–4–0 (Home: 4–3–0; Road: 7–1–0)
#	Date	Visitor	Score	Home	OT	Decision	Attendance	Record	Pts	Recap
25	December 1	Winnipeg	4–3	New Jersey	OT	Brossoit	16,514	15–8–2	32
26	December 2	Winnipeg	4–3	NY Rangers	SO	Hellebuyck	17,464	16–8–2	34
27	December 4	Winnipeg	3–1	NY Islanders		Hellebuyck	9,125	17–8–2	36
28	December 7	St. Louis	1–0	Winnipeg		Hellebuyck	15,321	17–9–2	36
29	December 9	Philadelphia	1–7	Winnipeg		Hellebuyck	15,321	18–9–2	38
30	December 11	Chicago	3–6	Winnipeg		Brossoit	15,321	19–9–2	40
31	December 13	Edmonton	4–5	Winnipeg	OT	Hellebuyck	15,321	20–9–2	42
32	December 14	Winnipeg	4–3	Chicago	OT	Brossoit	21,235	21–9–2	44
33	December 16	Tampa Bay	4–5	Winnipeg	OT	Hellebuyck	15,321	22–9–2	46
34	December 18	Winnipeg	1–4	Los Angeles		Hellebuyck	17,405	22–10–2	46
35	December 20	Winnipeg	5–3	San Jose		Hellebuyck	17,213	23–10–2	48
36	December 22	Winnipeg	1–0	Vancouver		Brossoit	18,028	24–10–2	50
37	December 27	Calgary	4–1	Winnipeg		Hellebuyck	15,321	24–11–2	50
38	December 29	Minnesota	3–1	Winnipeg		Hellebuyck	15,321	24–12–2	50
39	December 31	Winnipeg	4–3	Edmonton		Hellebuyck	18,347	25–12–2	52

January: 8–4–0 (Home: 6–0–0; Road: 2–4–0)
#	Date	Visitor	Score	Home	OT	Decision	Attendance	Record	Pts	Recap
40	January 4	Winnipeg	0–4	Pittsburgh		Hellebuyck	18,642	25–13–2	52
41	January 6	Dallas	1–5	Winnipeg		Hellebuyck	15,321	26–13–2	54
42	January 8	Colorado	4–7	Winnipeg		Hellebuyck	15,321	27–13–2	56
43	January 10	Winnipeg	2–3	Minnesota		Hellebuyck	19,072	27–14–2	56
44	January 11	Detroit	2–4	Winnipeg		Brossoit	15,321	28–14–2	58
45	January 13	Anaheim	3–4	Winnipeg	OT	Hellebuyck	15,321	29–14–2	60
46	January 15	Vegas	1–4	Winnipeg		Brossoit	15,321	30–14–2	62
47	January 17	Winnipeg	5–1	Nashville		Hellebuyck	17,507	31–14–2	64
48	January 19	Winnipeg	2–4	Dallas		Hellebuyck	18,532	31–15–2	64
49	January 28	Winnipeg	1–3	Philadelphia		Brossoit	19,087	31–16–2	64
50	January 29	Winnipeg	4–3	Boston	SO	Hellebuyck	17,565	32–16–2	66
51	January 31	Columbus	3–4	Winnipeg		Hellebuyck	15,321	33–16–2	68

February: 4–6–2 (Home: 2–2–2; Road: 2–4–0)
#	Date	Visitor	Score	Home	OT	Decision	Attendance	Record	Pts	Recap
52	February 2	Anaheim	3–9	Winnipeg		Hellebuyck	15,321	34–16–2	70
53	February 5	San Jose	3–2	Winnipeg	OT	Hellebuyck	15,321	34–16–3	71
54	February 7	Winnipeg	2–5	Montreal		Hellebuyck	21,302	34–17–3	71
55	February 9	Winnipeg	2–5	Ottawa		Brossoit	16,263	34–18–3	71
56	February 10	Winnipeg	3–1	Buffalo		Hellebuyck	17,966	35–18–3	73
57	February 12	NY Rangers	3–4	Winnipeg		Hellebuyck	15,321	36–18–3	75
58	February 14	Colorado	4–1	Winnipeg		Hellebuyck	15,321	36–19–3	75
59	February 16	Ottawa	4–3	Winnipeg	OT	Brossoit	15,321	36–19–4	76
60	February 20	Winnipeg	1–7	Colorado		Hellebuyck	15,021	36–20–4	76
61	February 22	Winnipeg	6–3	Vegas		Hellebuyck	18,280	37–20–4	78
62	February 24	Winnipeg	1–4	Arizona		Brossoit	17,125	37–21–4	78
63	February 26	Minnesota	3–2	Winnipeg		Hellebuyck	15,321	37–22–4	78

March: 8–7–0 (Home: 4–4–0; Road: 4–3–0)
#	Date	Visitor	Score	Home	OT	Decision	Attendance	Record	Pts	Recap
64	March 1	Nashville	3–5	Winnipeg		Brossoit	15,321	38–22–4	80
65	March 3	Winnipeg	5–2	Columbus		Hellebuyck	16,091	39–22–4	82
66	March 5	Winnipeg	2–5	Tampa Bay		Brossoit	19,092	39–23–4	82
67	March 8	Winnipeg	8–1	Carolina		Brossoit	15,928	40–23–4	84
68	March 10	Winnipeg	1–3	Washington		Hellebuyck	18,506	40–24–4	84
69	March 12	San Jose	5–4	Winnipeg		Hellebuyck	15,321	40–25–4	84
70	March 14	Boston	3–4	Winnipeg		Hellebuyck	15,321	41–25–4	86
71	March 16	Calgary	1–2	Winnipeg		Hellebuyck	15,321	42–25–4	88
72	March 18	Winnipeg	3–2	Los Angeles		Brossoit	17,842	43–25–4	90
73	March 20	Winnipeg	3–0	Anaheim		Hellebuyck	16,846	44–25–4	92
74	March 21	Winnipeg	0–5	Vegas		Brossoit	18,430	44–26–4	92
75	March 23	Nashville	0–5	Winnipeg		Hellebuyck	15,321	45–26–4	94
76	March 25	Dallas	5–2	Winnipeg		Hellebuyck	15,321	45–27–4	94
77	March 28	NY Islanders	5–4	Winnipeg		Hellebuyck	15,321	45–28–4	94
78	March 30	Montreal	3–1	Winnipeg		Hellebuyck	15,321	45–29–4	94

April: 2–1–1 (Home: 0–0–0; Road: 2–1–1)
#	Date	Visitor	Score	Home	OT	Decision	Attendance	Record	Pts	Recap
79	April 1	Winnipeg	4–3	Chicago	OT	Hellebuyck	21,314	46–29–4	96
80	April 2	Winnipeg	1–5	Minnesota		Comrie	18,590	46–30–4	96
81	April 4	Winnipeg	2–3	Colorado	OT	Hellebuyck	18,003	46–30–5	97
82	April 6	Winnipeg	4–2	Arizona		Hellebuyck	17,125	47–30–5	99

Legend: Win (2 points) Loss (0 points) Overtime/shootout loss (1 point)
Note:
^{a} Game was played at Hartwall Arena in Helsinki, Finland.

=== Playoffs ===
The Jets faced the St. Louis Blues in the first round of the playoffs, and were defeated in six games.

2019 Stanley Cup playoffs

Western Conference First Round vs. (C3) St. Louis Blues: St. Louis won 4–2
#	Date	Visitor	Score	Home	OT	Decision	Attendance	Series	Recap
1	April 10	St. Louis	2–1	Winnipeg		Hellebuyck	15,321	0–1
2	April 12	St. Louis	4–3	Winnipeg		Hellebuyck	15,321	0–2
3	April 14	Winnipeg	6–3	St. Louis		Hellebuyck	18,486	1–2
4	April 16	Winnipeg	2–1	St. Louis	OT	Hellebuyck	18,346	2–2
5	April 18	St. Louis	3–2	Winnipeg		Hellebuyck	15,321	2–3
6	April 20	Winnipeg	2–3	St. Louis		Hellebuyck	18,524	2–4

Legend: Win Loss

== Player statistics ==
As of April 20, 2019

=== Skaters ===
Regular season
Player	GP	G	A	Pts	+/−	PIM
Blake Wheeler	82	20	71	91	0	60
Mark Scheifele	82	38	46	84	8	38
Kyle Connor	82	34	32	66	–7	18
Patrik Laine	82	30	20	50	–24	42
Jacob Trouba	82	8	42	50	8	58
Bryan Little	82	15	26	41	–12	26
Nikolaj Ehlers	62	21	16	37	2	15
Tyler Myers	80	9	22	31	11	63
Josh Morrissey	59	6	25	31	9	14
Dustin Byfuglien	42	4	27	31	4	69
Mathieu Perreault	82	15	15	30	–1	44
Brandon Tanev	80	14	15	29	9	41
Andrew Copp	69	11	14	25	20	6
Jack Roslovic	77	9	15	24	–2	4
Adam Lowry	78	12	11	23	6	33
Ben Chiarot	78	5	15	20	6	62
Kevin Hayes^{†}	20	5	8	13	–3	2
Brendan Lemieux^{‡}	44	9	2	11	10	64
Mason Appleton	36	3	7	10	9	4
Joe Morrow	41	1	6	7	0	20
Dmitry Kulikov	57	0	6	6	4	47
Nathan Beaulieu^{†}	18	0	5	5	5	7
Sami Niku	30	1	3	4	0	2
Nic Petan^{‡}	13	0	2	2	–2	2
Kristian Vesalainen	5	0	1	1	0	0
Matt Hendricks^{†}	4	0	1	1	0	0
Cameron Schilling	4	0	1	1	0	0
Par Lindholm^{†}	4	0	1	1	0	0
Nelson Nogier	1	0	0	0	0	0

Playoffs
Player	GP	G	A	Pts	+/−	PIM
Dustin Byfuglien	6	2	6	8	4	4
Kyle Connor	6	3	2	5	–1	0
Mark Scheifele	6	2	3	5	0	8
Blake Wheeler	6	1	4	5	1	6
Andrew Copp	6	0	5	5	3	2
Patrik Laine	6	3	1	4	2	0
Kevin Hayes	6	2	1	3	2	2
Bryan Little	6	1	2	3	1	0
Brandon Tanev	5	1	1	2	0	0
Mathieu Perreault	5	0	2	2	1	8
Adam Lowry	6	1	0	1	–1	0
Jacob Trouba	6	0	1	1	–2	4
Josh Morrissey	6	0	1	1	–1	0
Jack Roslovic	6	0	0	0	1	0
Ben Chiarot	6	0	0	0	2	0
Nikolaj Ehlers	6	0	0	0	–2	0
Dmitry Kulikov	6	0	0	0	0	4
Tyler Myers	6	0	0	0	0	4
Par Lindholm	2	0	0	0	0	0

=== Goaltenders ===
Regular season
Player	GP	GS	TOI	W	L	OT	GA	GAA	SA	SV%	SO	G	A	PIM
Connor Hellebuyck	63	62	3,704:06	34	23	3	179	2.90	2,051	.913	2	0	3	4
Laurent Brossoit	21	19	1,165:17	13	6	2	49	2.52	652	.925	1	0	0	0
Eric Comrie	1	1	59:53	0	1	0	5	5.01	28	.821	0	0	0	0

Playoffs
Player	GP	GS	TOI	W	L	GA	GAA	SA	SV%	SO	G	A	PIM
Connor Hellebuyck	6	6	359:56	2	4	16	2.67	184	.913	0	0	0	0

^{†}Denotes player spent time with another team before joining the Jets. Stats reflect time with the Jets only.
^{‡}Denotes player was traded mid-season. Stats reflect time with the Jets only.
Bold/italics denotes franchise record.

== Transactions ==
The Jets have been involved in the following transactions during the 2018–19 season.

=== Trades ===
Date	Details		Ref
June 30, 2018	To Anaheim Ducks Chase De Leo	To Winnipeg Jets Nic Kerdiles	
June 30, 2018	To Montreal Canadiens Joel Armia; Steve Mason; 7th-round pick in 2019; 4th-round pick in 2020	To Winnipeg Jets Simon Bourque	
January 3, 2019	To Vegas Golden Knights Future considerations	To Winnipeg Jets Jimmy Oligny	
February 25, 2019	To Buffalo Sabres 6th-round pick in 2019	To Winnipeg Jets Nathan Beaulieu	
February 25, 2019	To Columbus Blue Jackets Future considerations	To Winnipeg Jets Alex Broadhurst	
February 25, 2019	To Florida Panthers 7th-round pick in 2021	To Winnipeg Jets Bogdan Kiselevich	
February 25, 2019	To Minnesota Wild 7th-round pick in 2020	To Winnipeg Jets Matt Hendricks	
February 25, 2019	To New York Rangers Brendan Lemieux; 1st-round pick in 2019; Conditional 4th-round pick in 2022	To Winnipeg Jets Kevin Hayes	
February 25, 2019	To Toronto Maple Leafs Nic Petan	To Winnipeg Jets Par Lindholm	
June 3, 2019	To Philadelphia Flyers Kevin Hayes	To Winnipeg Jets 5th-round pick in 2019	
June 17, 2019	To Winnipeg Jets Neal Pionk; 1st-round pick in 2019	To New York Rangers Jacob Trouba	

=== Free agents ===
Date	Player	Team	Contract term	Ref
July 1, 2018	Laurent Brossoit	from Edmonton Oilers	1-year	
July 1, 2018	Dennis Everberg	from Neftekhimik Nizhnekamsk (KHL)	1-year	
July 1, 2018	Seth Griffith	from Buffalo Sabres	1-year	
July 1, 2018	Matt Hendricks	to Minnesota Wild	1-year	
July 1, 2018	Michael Hutchinson	to Florida Panthers	1-year	
July 1, 2018	Paul Stastny	to Vegas Golden Knights	3-year	
July 2, 2018	Patrice Cormier	to Barys Astana (KHL)	Unknown	
July 2, 2018	Buddy Robinson	to Calgary Flames	2-year	
July 2, 2018	Michael Sgarbossa	to Washington Capitals	1-year	
July 3, 2018	Jan Kostalek	to Sparta Praha (ELH)	Unknown	
July 9, 2018	Jamie Phillips	to Charlotte Checkers (AHL)	Unknown	
July 13, 2018	Julian Melchiori	to Florida Panthers	1-year	
August 25, 2018	Tobias Enstrom	to Modo Hockey (Allsv.)	1-year	
September 11, 2018	Jimmy Lodge	to Kalamazoo Wings (ECHL)	1-year	
November 11, 2018	Logan Shaw	from San Diego Gulls (AHL)	1-year	
February 25, 2019	Ken Appleby	from Manitoba Moose (AHL)	1-year	
June 1, 2019	Andrei Chibisov	from Metallurg Magnitogorsk (KHL)	1-year	
June 15, 2019	Joona Luoto	from Tappara (Liiga)	3-year	

=== Waivers ===
Date	Player	Team	Ref
October 15, 2018	Marko Dano	to Colorado Avalanche	
November 23, 2018	Marko Dano	from Colorado Avalanche	

=== Contract terminations ===
Date	Player	Via	Ref
October 6, 2018	Simon Bourque	Mutual termination	
November 14, 2018	Dennis Everberg	Mutual termination	

=== Retirement ===
Date	Player	Ref

=== Signings ===
Date	Player	Contract term	Ref
June 26, 2018	Joe Morrow	1-year	
July 1, 2018	Cameron Schilling	1-year	
July 3, 2018	Skyler McKenzie	3-year	
July 12, 2018	Connor Hellebuyck	6-year	
July 19, 2018	Adam Lowry	3-year	
July 22, 2018	Brandon Tanev	1-year	
July 24, 2018	Marko Dano	1-year	
July 24, 2018	Tucker Poolman	3-year	
July 25, 2018	Jacob Trouba	1-year	
August 1, 2018	Nic Petan	1-year	
August 21, 2018	Nic Kerdiles	1-year	
August 26, 2018	Kristian Vesalainen	3-year	
August 29, 2018	JC Lipon	1-year	
September 4, 2018	Blake Wheeler	5-year	
September 6, 2018	Eric Comrie	1-year	
September 16, 2018	Josh Morrissey	2-year	
March 17, 2019	Johnny Kovacevic	2-year	
May 23, 2019	Leon Gawanke	3-year	
May 25, 2019	Laurent Brossoit	1-year	
June 5, 2019	Seth Griffith	1-year	
June 6, 2019	JC Lipon	1-year	
June 13, 2019	David Gustafsson	3-year	

== Draft picks ==
Below are the Winnipeg Jets' selections at the 2018 NHL entry draft, which was held on June 22 and 23, 2018, at the American Airlines Center in Dallas, Texas.

Round	#	Player	Pos	Nationality	College/Junior/Club team (League)
2	60	David Gustafsson	C	Sweden	HV71 (SHL)
3	91	Nathan Smith	C	United States	Cedar Rapids RoughRiders (USHL)
5	150^{1}	Declan Chisholm	D	Canada	Peterborough Petes (OHL)
5	153	Giovanni Vallati	D	Canada	Kitchener Rangers (OHL)
6	184	Jared Moe	G	United States	Waterloo Black Hawks (USHL)
7	215	Austin Wong	C	Canada	Okotoks Oilers (AJHL)

Notes:

1. The Boston Bruins' fifth-round pick went to the Winnipeg Jets as the result of a trade on March 1, 2017, that sent Drew Stafford to Boston in exchange for this pick (being conditional at the time of the trade). The condition – Winnipeg will receive a fifth-round pick in 2018 if the Bruins reach the 2017 Stanley Cup playoffs and Stafford plays in half of Boston's remaining games in the 2016–17 NHL season – was converted on April 4, 2017.
