= 2018–19 Dallas Stars season =

Season of play of professional ice hockey team

2018–19 Dallas Stars
- Division: 4th Central
- Conference: 6th Western
- 2018–19 record: 43–32–7
- Home record: 24–14–3
- Road record: 19–18–4
- Goals for: 210
- Goals against: 202

Team information
- General manager: Jim Nill
- Coach: Jim Montgomery
- Captain: Jamie Benn
- Alternate captains: John Klingberg; Alexander Radulov; Tyler Seguin; Jason Spezza
- Arena: American Airlines Center
- Average attendance: 18,178
- Minor league affiliates: Texas Stars (AHL); Idaho Steelheads (ECHL)

Team leaders
- Goals: Tyler Seguin (33)
- Assists: Tyler Seguin (47)
- Points: Tyler Seguin (80)
- Penalty minutes: Roman Polak (69)
- Plus/minus: Alexander Radulov (+22)
- Wins: Ben Bishop (27)
- Goals against average: Landon Bow (1.03)

The 2018–19 Dallas Stars season was the 52nd season for the National Hockey League (NHL) franchise that was established on June 5, 1967, and 26th season since the franchise relocated from Minnesota prior to the start of the 1993–94 NHL season. The Stars clinched a playoff spot on April 2, 2019, after a 6–2 win against the Philadelphia Flyers. They defeated the Nashville Predators in the First Round, and faced the St. Louis Blues in the Second Round, where they were defeated in seven games by the eventual Stanley Cup champions.

== Standings ==
Central Division
Pos	Team	GP	W	L	OTL	ROW	GF	GA	GD	Pts
1	y – Nashville Predators	82	47	29	6	43	240	214	+26	100
2	x – Winnipeg Jets	82	47	30	5	45	272	244	+28	99
3	x – St. Louis Blues	82	45	28	9	42	247	223	+24	99
4	x – Dallas Stars	82	43	32	7	42	210	202	+8	93
5	x – Colorado Avalanche	82	38	30	14	36	260	246	+14	90
6	Chicago Blackhawks	82	36	34	12	33	270	292	−22	84
7	Minnesota Wild	82	37	36	9	36	211	237	−26	83

Source: National Hockey League
x – Clinched playoff spot; y – Clinched division

Western Conference Wild Card
Pos	Div	Team	GP	W	L	OTL	ROW	GF	GA	GD	Pts
1	CE	x – Dallas Stars	82	43	32	7	42	210	202	+8	93
2	CE	x – Colorado Avalanche	82	38	30	14	36	260	246	+14	90
3	PA	Arizona Coyotes	82	39	35	8	35	213	223	−10	86
4	CE	Chicago Blackhawks	82	36	34	12	33	270	292	−22	84
5	CE	Minnesota Wild	82	37	36	9	36	211	237	−26	83
6	PA	Vancouver Canucks	82	35	36	11	29	225	254	−29	81
7	PA	Anaheim Ducks	82	35	37	10	32	199	251	−52	80
8	PA	Edmonton Oilers	82	35	38	9	32	232	274	−42	79
9	PA	Los Angeles Kings	82	31	42	9	28	202	263	−61	71

Source: National Hockey League
x – Clinched playoff spot

== Schedule and results ==
=== Preseason ===
The preseason schedule was published on June 13, 2018.

2018 preseason game log: 4–2–1 (Home: 2–1–1; Road: 2–1–0)
#	Date	Visitor	Score	Home	OT	Decision	Attendance	Record	Recap
1	September 18	St. Louis	3–5	Dallas		Bow	11,125	1–0–0
2	September 20	Dallas	3–1	Minnesota		Point	16,117	2–0–0
3^{[a]}	September 22	Florida	4–3	Dallas	OT	Point	—	2–0–1
4	September 24	Minnesota	3–5	Dallas		Khudobin	11,332	3–0–1
5	September 26	Dallas	3–1	Colorado		Bishop	—	4–0–1
6	September 28	Dallas	1–3	St. Louis		Bow	17,363	4–1–1
7	September 30	Colorado	6–5	Dallas		Point	12,211	4–2–1
Notes:^{a} Game was played at BOK Center in Tulsa, Oklahoma.

=== Regular season ===
The regular season schedule was released on June 21, 2018.

2018–19 game log

October: 6–5–0 (Home: 5–2–0; Road: 1–3–0)
#	Date	Visitor	Score	Home	OT	Decision	Attendance	Record	Pts	Recap
1	October 4	Arizona	0–3	Dallas		Bishop	18,532	1–0–0	2
2	October 6	Winnipeg	1–5	Dallas		Bishop	18,131	2–0–0	4
3	October 9	Toronto	7–4	Dallas		Bishop	17,866	2–1–0	4
4	October 13	Anaheim	3–5	Dallas		Khudobin	18,532	3–1–0	6
5	October 15	Dallas	1–4	Ottawa		Bishop	12,358	3–2–0	6
6	October 16	Dallas	0–3	New Jersey		Khudobin	12,808	3–3–0	6
7	October 19	Minnesota	3–1	Dallas		Bishop	18,346	3–4–0	6
8	October 23	Los Angeles	2–4	Dallas		Bishop	17,354	4–4–0	8
9	October 25	Anaheim	2–5	Dallas		Bishop	17,134	5–4–0	10
10	October 28	Dallas	2–4	Detroit		Bishop	19,515	5–5–0	10
11	October 30	Dallas	4–1	Montreal		Bishop	20,506	6–5–0	12

November: 7–5–3 (Home: 3–1–1; Road: 4–4–2)
#	Date	Visitor	Score	Home	OT	Decision	Attendance	Record	Pts	Recap
12	November 1	Dallas	2–1	Toronto		Khudobin	18,878	7–5–0	14
13	November 3	Dallas	4–3	Washington	OT	Bishop	18,506	8–5–0	16
14	November 5	Dallas	1–2	Boston	OT	Khudobin	17,565	8–5–1	17
15	November 6	Dallas	1–4	Columbus		Bishop	14,159	8–6–1	17
16	November 8	San Jose	3–4	Dallas		Khudobin	18,137	9–6–1	19
17	November 10	Nashville	5–4	Dallas	OT	Bishop	18,532	9–6–2	20
18	November 12	Columbus	2–1	Dallas		Khudobin	17,543	9–7–2	20
19	November 16	Boston	0–1	Dallas	OT	Bishop	18,532	10–7–2	22
20	November 18	Dallas	6–2	NY Islanders		Bishop	10,650	11–7–2	24
21	November 19	Dallas	1–2	NY Rangers		Khudobin	17,071	11–8–2	24
22	November 21	Dallas	1–5	Pittsburgh		Khudobin	18,340	11–9–2	24
23	November 23	Ottawa	4–6	Dallas		Khudobin	18,532	12–9–2	26
24	November 24	Dallas	2–3	Colorado		Khudobin	18,010	12–10–2	26
25	November 27	Dallas	0–1	Edmonton	OT	Khudobin	18,347	12–10–3	27
26	November 28	Dallas	4–3	Calgary	OT	Khudobin	17,676	13–10–3	29

December: 7–6–1 (Home: 4–2–1; Road: 3–4–0)
#	Date	Visitor	Score	Home	OT	Decision	Attendance	Record	Pts	Recap
27	December 1	Dallas	2–1	Vancouver		Bishop	17,387	14–10–3	31
28	December 3	Edmonton	1–4	Dallas		Khudobin	18,125	15–10–3	33
29	December 7	San Jose	2–3	Dallas		Bishop	18,342	16–10–3	35
30	December 9	Dallas	2–4	Vegas		Bishop	18,240	16–11–3	35
31	December 12	Dallas	3–6	Anaheim		Bishop	16,810	16–12–3	35
32	December 13	Dallas	2–3	San Jose		Khudobin	17,185	16–13–3	35
33	December 15	Dallas	4–6	Colorado		Bishop	17,626	16–14–3	35
34	December 18	Calgary	0–2	Dallas		Bishop	18,127	17–14–3	37
35	December 20	Chicago	5–2	Dallas		Bishop	18,532	17–15–3	37
36	December 22	Dallas	2–1	Minnesota	OT	Bishop	19,074	18–15–3	39
37	December 23	NY Islanders	3–1	Dallas		Khudobin	18,031	18–16–3	39
38	December 27	Dallas	2–0	Nashville		Khudobin	16,676	19–16–3	41
39	December 29	Detroit	1–5	Dallas		Bishop	18,532	20–16–3	43
40	December 31	Montreal	3–2	Dallas	OT	Bishop	18,532	20–16–4	44

January: 5–5–0 (Home: 4–3–0; Road: 1–2–0)
#	Date	Visitor	Score	Home	OT	Decision	Attendance	Record	Pts	Recap
41	January 2	New Jersey	4–5	Dallas		Bishop	18,133	21–16–4	46
42	January 4	Washington	1–2	Dallas	OT	Khudobin	18,532	22–16–4	48
43	January 6	Dallas	1–5	Winnipeg		Bishop	15,321	22–17–4	48
44	January 8	Dallas	3–1	St. Louis		Bishop	17,037	23–17–4	50
45	January 10	Dallas	1–2	Philadelphia		Khudobin	19,448	23–18–4	50
46	January 12	St. Louis	3–1	Dallas		Bishop	18,124	23–19–4	50
47	January 15	Tampa Bay	2–0	Dallas		Khudobin	18,021	23–20–4	50
48	January 17	Los Angeles	2–1	Dallas		Bishop	18,045	23–21–4	50
49	January 19	Winnipeg	2–4	Dallas		Bishop	18,532	24–21–4	52
50	January 30	Buffalo	0–1	Dallas		Bishop	17,986	25–21–4	54

February: 7–6–1 (Home: 3–2–0; Road: 4–4–1)
#	Date	Visitor	Score	Home	OT	Decision	Attendance	Record	Pts	Recap
51	February 1	Minnesota	1–3	Dallas		Bishop	18,124	26–21–4	56
52	February 2	Dallas	3–1	Nashville		Khudobin	17,722	27–21–4	58
53	February 4	Arizona	4–5	Dallas		Bishop	17,996	28–21–4	60
54	February 7	Dallas	2–3	Nashville	OT	Khudobin	17,174	28–21–5	61
55	February 9	Dallas	2–3	Arizona		Khudobin	13,418	28–22–5	61
56	February 12	Dallas	3–0	Florida		Khudobin	9,472	29–22–5	63
57	February 14	Dallas	0–6	Tampa Bay		Khudobin	19,092	29–23–5	63
58	February 16	Dallas	0–3	Carolina		Khudobin	14,369	29–24–5	63
59	February 19	Nashville	5–3	Dallas		Khudobin	17,985	29–25–5	63
60	February 21	St. Louis	2–5	Dallas		Khudobin	17,945	30–25–5	65
61	February 23	Carolina	3–0	Dallas		Bishop	18,532	30–26–5	65
62	February 24	Dallas	4–3	Chicago		Khudobin	21,474	31–26–5	67
63	February 26	Dallas	1–4	Vegas		Bishop	18,261	31–27–5	67
64	February 28	Dallas	4–3	Los Angeles	OT	Khudobin	18,230	32–27–5	69

March: 9–4–2 (Home: 3–4–1; Road: 6–0–1)
#	Date	Visitor	Score	Home	OT	Decision	Attendance	Record	Pts	Recap
65	March 2	Dallas	4–1	St. Louis		Bishop	18,166	33–27–5	71
66	March 5	NY Rangers	0–1	Dallas		Bishop	17,974	34–27–5	73
67	March 7	Colorado	0–4	Dallas		Bishop	18,011	35–27–5	75
68	March 9	Chicago	2–1	Dallas		Khudobin	18,532	35–28–5	75
69	March 12	Dallas	2–0	Buffalo		Bishop	17,830	36–28–5	77
70	March 14	Dallas	4–1	Minnesota		Bishop	18,919	37–28–5	79
71	March 15	Vegas	2–1	Dallas		Khudobin	18,532	37–29–5	79
72	March 17	Vancouver	3–2	Dallas	SO	Khudobin	18,125	37–29–6	80
73	March 19	Florida	2–4	Dallas		Bishop	17,654	38–29–6	82
74	March 21	Colorado	3–1	Dallas		Bishop	17,543	38–30–6	82
75	March 23	Pittsburgh	3–2	Dallas		Khudobin	18,532	38–31–6	82
76	March 25	Dallas	5–2	Winnipeg		Bishop	15,321	39–31–6	84
77	March 27	Dallas	2–1	Calgary		Khudobin	18,881	40–31–6	86
78	March 28	Dallas	3–2	Edmonton	SO	Khudobin	18,347	41–31–6	88
79	March 30	Dallas	2–3	Vancouver	SO	Khudobin	18,663	41–31–7	89

April: 2–1–0 (Home: 2–0–0; Road: 0–1–0)
#	Date	Visitor	Score	Home	OT	Decision	Attendance	Record	Pts	Recap
80	April 2	Philadelphia	2–6	Dallas		Khudobin	18,532	42–31–7	91
81	April 5	Dallas	1–6	Chicago		Khudobin	21,626	42–32–7	91
82	April 6	Minnesota	0–3	Dallas		Bishop	18,532	43–32–7	93

Legend: Win (2 points) Loss (0 points) Overtime/shootout loss (1 point)

=== Playoffs ===
The Stars faced the Nashville Predators in the First Round of the playoffs, and defeated them in six games.

The Stars faced the St. Louis Blues in the Second Round of the playoffs, and were defeated in seven games.

2019 Stanley Cup playoffs

Western Conference First Round vs. (C1) Nashville Predators: Dallas won 4–2
#	Date	Visitor	Score	Home	OT	Decision	Attendance	Series	Recap
1	April 10	Dallas	3–2	Nashville		Bishop	17,458	1–0
2	April 13	Dallas	1–2	Nashville	OT	Bishop	17,611	1–1
3	April 15	Nashville	3–2	Dallas		Bishop	18,532	1–2
4	April 17	Nashville	1–5	Dallas		Bishop	18,532	2–2
5	April 20	Dallas	5–3	Nashville		Bishop	17,633	3–2
6	April 22	Nashville	1–2	Dallas	OT	Bishop	19,025	4–2

Western Conference Second Round vs. (C3) St. Louis Blues: St. Louis won 4–3
#	Date	Visitor	Score	Home	OT	Decision	Attendance	Series	Recap
1	April 25	Dallas	2–3	St. Louis		Bishop	18,014	0–1
2	April 27	Dallas	4–2	St. Louis		Bishop	18,285	1–1
3	April 29	St. Louis	4–3	Dallas		Bishop	18,532	1–2
4	May 1	St. Louis	2–4	Dallas		Bishop	18,790	2–2
5	May 3	Dallas	2–1	St. Louis		Bishop	18,542	3–2
6	May 5	St. Louis	4–1	Dallas		Bishop	18,876	3–3
7	May 7	Dallas	1–2	St. Louis	2OT	Bishop	18,531	3–4

Legend: Win Loss

== Player statistics ==
As of May 7, 2019

=== Skaters ===
Regular season
Player	GP	G	A	Pts	+/−	PIM
Tyler Seguin	82	33	47	80	17	18
Alexander Radulov	70	29	43	72	22	54
Jamie Benn	78	27	26	53	14	56
John Klingberg	64	10	35	45	6	12
Miro Heiskanen	82	12	21	33	−14	16
Esa Lindell	82	11	21	32	14	33
Radek Faksa	81	15	15	30	−3	54
Jason Spezza	76	8	19	27	−13	29
Mattias Janmark	81	6	19	25	−4	24
Roope Hintz	58	9	13	22	−11	24
Jason Dickinson	67	6	16	22	9	23
Blake Comeau	77	7	11	18	−7	42
Devin Shore^{‡}	42	5	12	17	0	7
Tyler Pitlick	47	8	4	12	−2	6
Taylor Fedun	54	4	7	11	2	14
Valeri Nichushkin	57	0	10	10	−4	0
Roman Polak	77	1	8	9	6	69
Brett Ritchie	53	4	2	6	−7	57
Andrew Cogliano^{†}	32	3	3	6	−1	8
Gavin Bayreuther	19	2	3	5	2	10
Denis Gurianov	21	1	3	4	−3	0
Connor Carrick^{‡}	14	1	3	4	−7	13
Julius Honka	29	0	4	4	−2	10
Gemel Smith^{‡}	14	2	1	3	−1	0
Mats Zuccarello^{†}	2	1	2	3	3	0
Joel L'Esperance	18	2	0	2	−4	6
Martin Hanzal	7	1	1	2	−4	4
Ben Lovejoy^{†}	20	0	2	2	−2	4
Erik Condra	6	1	0	1	−2	2
Dillon Heatherington	5	0	1	1	4	0
Ben Gleason	4	0	1	1	−1	0
Jamie Oleksiak^{†}	21	0	1	1	0	8
Justin Dowling	11	0	1	1	−4	0
Joel Hanley	16	0	0	0	0	2
Marc Methot	9	0	0	0	−3	6

Playoffs
Player	GP	G	A	Pts	+/−	PIM
Mats Zuccarello	13	4	7	11	2	6
Tyler Seguin	13	4	7	11	3	2
Alexander Radulov	13	5	5	10	5	8
Jamie Benn	13	2	8	10	2	10
John Klingberg	13	2	7	9	8	6
Roope Hintz	13	5	3	8	−1	2
Jason Spezza	11	3	2	5	−1	0
Jason Dickinson	13	3	2	5	0	4
Miro Heiskanen	13	2	2	4	0	2
Esa Lindell	13	1	3	4	4	4
Mattias Janmark	7	1	2	3	−1	8
Andrew Cogliano	13	2	0	2	−1	4
Blake Comeau	13	1	1	2	0	16
Justin Dowling	13	0	2	2	−6	0
Radek Faksa	13	0	1	1	−1	6
Roman Polak	13	0	1	1	−2	10
Ben Lovejoy	13	0	1	1	−7	0
Valeri Nichushkin	1	0	0	0	0	0
Brett Ritchie	1	0	0	0	0	2
Tyler Pitlick	6	0	0	0	−5	2
Joel Hanley	1	0	0	0	0	0
Dillon Heatherington	1	0	0	0	0	0
Taylor Fedun	7	0	0	0	−5	2
Jamie Oleksiak	4	0	0	0	−1	0

=== Goaltenders ===
Regular season
Player	GP	GS	TOI	W	L	OT	GA	GAA	SA	SV%	SO	G	A	PIM
Ben Bishop	46	45	2,637:18	27	15	2	87	1.98	1,323	.934	7	0	2	2
Anton Khudobin	41	37	2,219:30	16	17	5	95	2.57	1,232	.923	2	0	0	2
Landon Bow	2	0	58:15	0	0	0	1	1.03	19	.947	0	0	0	0

Playoffs
Player	GP	GS	TOI	W	L	GA	GAA	SA	SV%	SO	G	A	PIM
Ben Bishop	13	13	810:59	7	6	30	2.22	448	.933	0	0	0	2
Anton Khudobin	1	0	11:05	0	0	0	0.00	5	1.000	0	0	0	0

^{†}Denotes player spent time with another team before joining the Stars. Stats reflect time with the Stars only.
^{‡}Denotes player was traded mid-season. Stats reflect time with the Stars only.
Bold/italics denotes franchise record.

== Transactions ==
The Stars have been involved in the following transactions during the 2018–19 season.

=== Trades ===
Date	Details		Ref
October 1, 2018	To Toronto Maple Leafs Conditional 7th-round pick in 2019	To Dallas Stars Connor Carrick	
November 10, 2018	To Buffalo Sabres Conditional 7th-round pick in 2020	To Dallas Stars Taylor Fedun	
January 14, 2019	To Anaheim Ducks Devin Shore	To Dallas Stars Andrew Cogliano	
January 28, 2019	To Pittsburgh Penguins Conditional 4th-round pick in 2019	To Dallas Stars Jamie Oleksiak	
February 23, 2019	To New Jersey Devils Connor Carrick; 3rd-round pick in 2019	To Dallas Stars Ben Lovejoy	
February 23, 2019	To New York Rangers Conditional 2nd-round pick in 2019; Conditional 3rd-round pick in 2020	To Dallas Stars Mats Zuccarello	

=== Free agents ===
Date	Player	Team	Contract term	Ref
July 1, 2018	Blake Comeau	from Colorado Avalanche	3-year	
July 1, 2018	Erik Condra	from Tampa Bay Lightning	1-year	
July 1, 2018	Brian Flynn	to St. Louis Blues	1-year	
July 1, 2018	Joel Hanley	from Arizona Coyotes	1-year	
July 1, 2018	Anton Khudobin	from Boston Bruins	2-year	
July 1, 2018	Joel L'Esperance	from Texas Stars (AHL)	2-year	
July 1, 2018	Mike McKenna	to Ottawa Senators	1-year	
July 1, 2018	Curtis McKenzie	to Vegas Golden Knights	2-year	
July 1, 2018	Michael Mersch	from Los Angeles Kings	2-year	
July 1, 2018	Greg Pateryn	to Minnesota Wild	3-year	
July 1, 2018	Roman Polak	from Toronto Maple Leafs	1-year	
July 1, 2018	Antoine Roussel	to Vancouver Canucks	4-year	
July 19, 2018	Brent Regner	to Red Bull Salzburg (EBEL)	Unknown	
July 25, 2018	Dan Hamhuis	to Nashville Predators	2-year	
August 2, 2018	Cole Ully	to Colorado Eagles (AHL)	Unknown	
September 13, 2018	Ben Gleason	from Hamilton Bulldogs (OHL)	3-year	
September 13, 2018	Andrew O'Brien	to Stockton Heat (AHL)	Unknown	
March 1, 2019	Tye Felhaber	from Ottawa 67's (OHL)	3-year	
March 19, 2019	Josh Melnick	from Miami RedHawks (NCHC)	1-year	
April 29, 2019	Emil Djuse	from Skellefteå AIK (SHL)	1-year	
May 31, 2019	Joel Kiviranta	from Vaasan Sport (Liiga)	2-year	

=== Waivers ===
Date	Player	Team	Ref
October 2, 2018	Remi Elie	to Buffalo Sabres	
December 6, 2018	Gemel Smith	to Boston Bruins	

=== Contract terminations ===
Date	Player	Via	Ref

=== Retirement ===
Date	Player	Ref

=== Signings ===
Date	Player	Contract term	Ref
June 22, 2018	Stephen Johns	3-year	
June 26, 2018	Reece Scarlett	1-year	
July 1, 2018	Valeri Nichushkin	2-year	
July 1, 2018	Colton Point	3-year	
July 3, 2018	Remi Elie	1-year	
July 6, 2018	Jason Dickinson	1-year	
July 12, 2018	Philippe Desrosiers	1-year	
July 12, 2018	Adam Mascherin	3-year	
July 13, 2018	Devin Shore	2-year	
July 16, 2018	Dillon Heatherington	1-year	
July 25, 2018	Mattias Janmark	1-year	
August 3, 2018	Gemel Smith	1-year	
September 13, 2018	Tyler Seguin	8-year	
September 19, 2018	Ty Dellandrea	3-year	
February 20, 2019	Joel Hanley	2-year	
March 9, 2019	Justin Dowling	2-year	
March 19, 2019	Joseph Cecconi	2-year	
March 19, 2019	Rhett Gardner	2-year	
March 25, 2019	Jake Oettinger	3-year	
April 1, 2019	Riley Damiani	3-year	
April 17, 2019	Riley Tufte	3-year	
May 16, 2019	Esa Lindell	6-year	
June 6, 2019	Mattias Janmark	1-year	
June 6, 2019	Roman Polak	1-year	

== Draft picks ==
Below are the Dallas Stars' selections at the 2018 NHL entry draft, which was held on June 22 and 23, 2018, at the American Airlines Center in Dallas, Texas.

Round	#	Player	Pos	Nationality	College/Junior/Club team (League)
1	13	Ty Dellandrea	C	Canada	Flint Firebirds (OHL)
2	44	Albin Eriksson	LW	Sweden	Skelleftea AIK (SHL)
3	75	Oskar Back	C	Sweden	Farjestad BK J20 (SuperElit)
4	100^{1}	Adam Mascherin	LW	Canada	Kitchener Rangers (OHL)
4	106	Curtis Douglas	C	Canada	Windsor Spitfires (OHL)
5	137	Riley Damiani	C	Canada	Kitchener Rangers (OHL)
6	168	Dawson Barteaux	D	Canada	Red Deer Rebels (WHL)
7	199	Jermaine Loewen	LW	Canada	Kamloops Blazers (WHL)

Notes:

1. The Chicago Blackhawks' fourth-round pick went to the Dallas Stars as the result of a trade on February 28, 2017, that sent Johnny Oduya to Chicago in exchange for Mark McNeill and this pick (being conditional at the time of the trade).
