= 2018–19 Arizona Coyotes season =

NHL hockey team season

2018–19 Arizona Coyotes
- Division: 4th Pacific
- Conference: 9th Western
- 2018–19 record: 39–35–8
- Home record: 20–17–4
- Road record: 19–18–4
- Goals for: 213
- Goals against: 223

Team information
- General manager: John Chayka
- Coach: Rick Tocchet
- Captain: Oliver Ekman-Larsson
- Alternate captains: Niklas Hjalmarsson; Derek Stepan
- Arena: Gila River Arena
- Average attendance: 13,989
- Minor league affiliates: Tucson Roadrunners (AHL); Norfolk Admirals (ECHL)

Team leaders
- Goals: Alex Galchenyuk; Brad Richardson (19)
- Assists: Clayton Keller (33)
- Points: Clayton Keller (47)
- Penalty minutes: Lawson Crouse (67)
- Plus/minus: Jason Demers (+9)
- Wins: Darcy Kuemper (27)
- Goals against average: Darcy Kuemper (2.33)

The 2018–19 Arizona Coyotes season was the 40th season for the National Hockey League (NHL) franchise that was established on June 22, 1979, the 23rd season since the franchise relocated from Winnipeg following the 1995–96 NHL season, and the 47th overall, including the World Hockey Association years. On April 4, 2019, the Coyotes were eliminated from playoff contention after the Colorado Avalanche's 3–2 overtime win against the Winnipeg Jets. However, the team secured their first winning season since 2013-14.

== Standings ==
Pacific Division
Pos	Team	GP	W	L	OTL	ROW	GF	GA	GD	Pts
1	z – Calgary Flames	82	50	25	7	50	289	227	+62	107
2	x – San Jose Sharks	82	46	27	9	46	289	261	+28	101
3	x – Vegas Golden Knights	82	43	32	7	40	249	230	+19	93
4	Arizona Coyotes	82	39	35	8	35	213	223	−10	86
5	Vancouver Canucks	82	35	36	11	29	225	254	−29	81
6	Anaheim Ducks	82	35	37	10	32	199	251	−52	80
7	Edmonton Oilers	82	35	38	9	32	232	274	−42	79
8	Los Angeles Kings	82	31	42	9	28	202	263	−61	71

Source: National Hockey League
x – Clinched playoff spot; z – Clinched conference

Western Conference Wild Card
Pos	Div	Team	GP	W	L	OTL	ROW	GF	GA	GD	Pts
1	CE	x – Dallas Stars	82	43	32	7	42	210	202	+8	93
2	CE	x – Colorado Avalanche	82	38	30	14	36	260	246	+14	90
3	PA	Arizona Coyotes	82	39	35	8	35	213	223	−10	86
4	CE	Chicago Blackhawks	82	36	34	12	33	270	292	−22	84
5	CE	Minnesota Wild	82	37	36	9	36	211	237	−26	83
6	PA	Vancouver Canucks	82	35	36	11	29	225	254	−29	81
7	PA	Anaheim Ducks	82	35	37	10	32	199	251	−52	80
8	PA	Edmonton Oilers	82	35	38	9	32	232	274	−42	79
9	PA	Los Angeles Kings	82	31	42	9	28	202	263	−61	71

Source: National Hockey League
x – Clinched playoff spot

== Schedule and results ==
=== Preseason ===
The preseason schedule was published on June 13, 2018.

2018 preseason game log: 4–2–1 (Home: 2–0–0; Road: 2–2–1)
#	Date	Visitor	Score	Home	OT	Decision	Attendance	Record	Recap
1	September 16	Arizona	2–7	Vegas		Kuemper	17,567	0–1–0
2^{[A]}	September 18	Los Angeles	2–4	Arizona		Raanta	9,807	1–1–0
3^{[A]}	September 18	Arizona	4–3	Los Angeles		Kuemper	10,612	2–1–0
4	September 22	Anaheim	1–6	Arizona		Raanta	6,559	3–1–0
5	September 24	Arizona	2–4	Anaheim		Kuemper	13,834	3–2–0
6	September 27	Arizona	2–3	Edmonton	OT	Raanta	18,347	3–2–1
7^{[a]}	September 29	Arizona	4–1	Vancouver		Kuemper	–	4–2–1
Notes:^{A} Indicates split-squad.^{a} Game was played at Prospera Place in Kelowna, British Columbia.

=== Regular season ===
The regular season schedule was released on June 21, 2018.

2018–19 game log

October: 6–5–0 (Home: 3–2–0; Road: 3–3–0)
#	Date	Visitor	Score	Home	OT	Decision	Attendance	Record	Pts	Recap
1	October 4	Arizona	0–3	Dallas		Raanta	18,532	0–1–0	0
2	October 6	Anaheim	1–0	Arizona		Raanta	17,125	0–2–0	0
3	October 10	Arizona	3–2	Anaheim	SO	Raanta	17,015	1–2–0	2
4	October 13	Buffalo	3–0	Arizona		Raanta	15,304	1–3–0	2
5	October 16	Arizona	1–2	Minnesota		Kuemper	18,795	1–4–0	2
6	October 18	Arizona	4–1	Chicago		Raanta	21,210	2–4–0	4
7	October 20	Arizona	3–5	Winnipeg		Raanta	15,321	2–5–0	4
8	October 23	Arizona	4–1	Columbus		Kuemper	11,458	3–5–0	6
9	October 25	Vancouver	1–4	Arizona		Kuemper	12,955	4–5–0	8
10	October 27	Tampa Bay	1–7	Arizona		Raanta	13,623	5–5–0	10
11	October 30	Ottawa	1–5	Arizona		Raanta	13,988	6–5–0	12

November: 5–6–2 (Home: 2–4–1; Road: 3–2–1)
#	Date	Visitor	Score	Home	OT	Decision	Attendance	Record	Pts	Recap
12	November 2	Carolina	3–4	Arizona	OT	Raanta	10,562	7–5–0	14
13	November 5	Philadelphia	5–2	Arizona		Kuemper	13,719	7–6–0	14
14	November 8	Arizona	4–5	Philadelphia	OT	Kuemper	18,884	7–6–1	15
15	November 10	Arizona	0–4	Pittsburgh		Kuemper	18,596	7–7–1	15
16	November 11	Arizona	4–1	Washington		Kuemper	18,506	8–7–1	17
17	November 13	Arizona	1–6	Detroit		Kuemper	18,257	8–8–1	17
18	November 15	Nashville	1–2	Arizona		Kuemper	13,315	9–8–1	19
19	November 17	Boston	2–1	Arizona		Kuemper	16,386	9–9–1	19
20	November 21	Vegas	3–2	Arizona	OT	Kuemper	14,151	9–9–2	20
21	November 23	Colorado	5–1	Arizona		Raanta	12,029	9–10–2	20
22	November 25	Calgary	6–1	Arizona		Raanta	12,821	9–11–2	20
23	November 27	Arizona	4–3	Minnesota		Hill	18,706	10–11–2	22
24	November 29	Arizona	3–0	Nashville		Hill	17,165	11–11–2	24

December: 6–9–0 (Home: 2–5–0; Road: 4–4–0)
#	Date	Visitor	Score	Home	OT	Decision	Attendance	Record	Pts	Recap
25	December 1	St. Louis	1–6	Arizona		Hill	13,451	12–11–2	26
26	December 4	Arizona	2–1	Los Angeles		Hill	17,203	13–11–2	28
27	December 6	Washington	4–2	Arizona		Hill	11,910	13–12–2	28
28	December 8	San Jose	5–3	Arizona		Hill	13,780	13–13–2	28
29	December 11	Arizona	3–4	Boston		Kuemper	17,565	13–14–2	28
30	December 13	Arizona	1–3	Buffalo		Kuemper	16,872	13–15–2	28
31	December 14	Arizona	4–3	NY Rangers	OT	Hill	17,441	14–15–2	30
32	December 16	Arizona	0–3	Carolina		Hill	13,051	14–16–2	30
33	December 18	NY Islanders	3–1	Arizona		Kuemper	11,640	14–17–2	30
34	December 20	Montreal	2–1	Arizona		Kuemper	11,149	14–18–2	30
35	December 22	Colorado	4–6	Arizona		Hill	13,896	15–18–2	32
36	December 23	Arizona	4–3	San Jose	SO	Kuemper	17,325	16–18–2	34
37	December 27	Arizona	1–2	Los Angeles		Kuemper	18,230	16–19–2	34
38	December 29	Arizona	5–4	Anaheim	OT	Hill	17,174	17–19–2	36
39	December 30	Vegas	5–1	Arizona		Kuemper	17,125	17–20–2	36

January: 6–3–2 (Home: 2–1–2; Road: 4–2–0)
#	Date	Visitor	Score	Home	OT	Decision	Attendance	Record	Pts	Recap
40	January 2	Edmonton	3–1	Arizona		Hill	12,583	17–21–2	36
41	January 4	New Jersey	3–2	Arizona	SO	Kuemper	12,636	17–21–3	37
42	January 6	NY Rangers	0–5	Arizona		Kuemper	12,396	18–21–3	39
43	January 10	Arizona	4–3	Vancouver	OT	Kuemper	18,527	19–21–3	41
44	January 12	Arizona	3–2	Edmonton		Kuemper	18,347	20–21–3	43
45	January 13	Arizona	1–7	Calgary		Hill	17,849	20–22–3	43
46	January 16	San Jose	3–6	Arizona		Kuemper	13,342	21–22–3	45
47	January 18	Pittsburgh	3–2	Arizona	OT	Kuemper	14,757	21–22–4	46
48	January 20	Arizona	4–2	Toronto		Kuemper	19,165	22–22–4	48
49	January 22	Arizona	3–2	Ottawa		Kuemper	12,236	23–22–4	50
50	January 23	Arizona	1–2	Montreal		Pickard	21,002	23–23–4	50

February: 8–5–1 (Home: 5–2–0; Road: 3–3–1)
#	Date	Visitor	Score	Home	OT	Decision	Attendance	Record	Pts	Recap
51	February 2	Arizona	2–3	San Jose	OT	Kuemper	17,227	23–23–5	51
52	February 4	Arizona	4–5	Dallas		Kuemper	17,996	23–24–5	51
53	February 5	Arizona	2–5	Nashville		Pickard	17,295	23–25–5	51
54	February 7	Columbus	4–2	Arizona		Kuemper	15,319	23–26–5	51
55	February 9	Dallas	2–3	Arizona		Kuemper	13,418	24–26–5	53
56	February 12	Arizona	5–2	Vegas		Kuemper	18,212	25–26–5	55
57	February 14	St. Louis	4–0	Arizona		Kuemper	12,533	25–27–5	55
58	February 16	Toronto	0–2	Arizona		Kuemper	17,125	26–27–5	57
59	February 18	Arizona	2–5	Calgary		Pickard	18,985	26–28–5	57
60	February 19	Arizona	3–2	Edmonton	SO	Kuemper	18,347	27–28–5	59
61	February 21	Arizona	3–2	Vancouver	OT	Kuemper	18,568	28–28–5	61
62	February 24	Winnipeg	1–4	Arizona		Kuemper	17,125	29–28–5	63
63	February 26	Florida	3–4	Arizona	SO	Kuemper	11,912	30–28–5	65
64	February 28	Vancouver	2–5	Arizona		Kuemper	12,767	31–28–5	67

March: 7–5–3 (Home: 6–1–1; Road: 1–4–2)
#	Date	Visitor	Score	Home	OT	Decision	Attendance	Record	Pts	Recap
65	March 2	Detroit	1–3	Arizona		Kuemper	15,552	32–28–5	69
66	March 5	Anaheim	3–1	Arizona		Kuemper	11,305	32–29–5	69
67	March 7	Calgary	0–2	Arizona		Kuemper	13,341	33–29–5	71
68	March 9	Los Angeles	2–4	Arizona		Kuemper	14,976	34–29–5	73
69	March 11	Arizona	1–7	Chicago		Kuemper	21,574	34–30–5	73
70	March 12	Arizona	3–1	St. Louis		Kuemper	18,428	35–30–5	75
71	March 14	Anaheim	1–6	Arizona		Kuemper	14,202	36–30–5	77
72	March 16	Edmonton	3–2	Arizona	OT	Kuemper	15,016	36–30–6	78
73	March 18	Arizona	1–4	Tampa Bay		Kuemper	19,092	36–31–6	78
74	March 21	Arizona	2–4	Florida		Kuemper	12,576	36–32–6	78
75	March 23	Arizona	1–2	New Jersey	SO	Kuemper	16,514	36–32–7	79
76	March 24	Arizona	0–2	NY Islanders		Kuemper	13,917	36–33–7	79
77	March 26	Chicago	0–1	Arizona		Kuemper	15,055	37–33–7	81
78	March 29	Arizona	2–3	Colorado	SO	Kuemper	18,045	37–33–8	82
79	March 31	Minnesota	0–4	Arizona		Kuemper	17,431	38–33–8	84

April: 1–2–0 (Home: 0–2–0; Road: 1–0–0)
#	Date	Visitor	Score	Home	OT	Decision	Attendance	Record	Pts	Recap
80	April 2	Los Angeles	3–1	Arizona		Kuemper	14,687	38–34–8	84
81	April 4	Arizona	4–1	Vegas		Kuemper	18,485	39–34–8	86
82	April 6	Winnipeg	4–2	Arizona		Pickard	17,125	39–35–8	86

Legend: Win (2 points) Loss (0 points) Overtime/shootout loss (1 point)

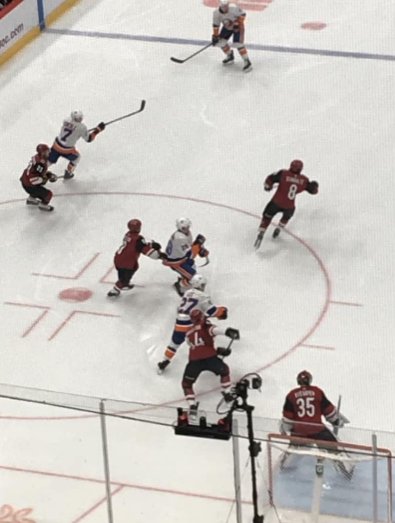
Coyotes vs. Islanders NHL hockey game on December 18, 2018, at Glendale, Arizona. The Coyotes, wearing a red uniform, lost this game, 3 to 1.

== Player statistics ==
As of April 6, 2019

=== Skaters ===
Regular season
Player	GP	G	A	Pts	+/−	PIM
Clayton Keller	82	14	33	47	−21	24
Oliver Ekman-Larsson	81	14	30	44	−16	52
Alex Galchenyuk	72	19	22	41	−19	34
Vinnie Hinostroza	72	16	23	39	−4	14
Derek Stepan	72	15	20	35	−2	14
Richard Panik	75	14	19	33	−3	44
Brad Richardson	66	19	8	27	6	22
Nick Cousins	81	7	20	27	−8	35
Alex Goligoski	76	3	24	27	−7	16
Lawson Crouse	81	11	14	25	5	67
Josh Archibald	68	12	10	22	1	15
Jordan Oesterle	71	6	14	20	−3	12
Jakob Chychrun	53	5	15	20	−12	28
Conor Garland	47	13	5	18	1	12
Christian Fischer	71	11	7	18	−13	27
Michael Grabner	41	9	7	16	−2	8
Nick Schmaltz^{†}	17	5	9	14	−8	2
Niklas Hjalmarsson	82	0	10	10	8	44
Mario Kempe	52	4	5	9	5	18
Jason Demers	35	2	6	8	9	12
Kevin Connauton	50	1	7	8	−2	22
Christian Dvorak	20	2	5	7	−2	2
Dylan Strome^{‡}	20	3	3	6	−10	6
Brendan Perlini^{‡}	22	2	4	6	−5	8
Ilya Lyubushkin	41	0	4	4	−9	13
Jordan Weal^{†‡}	19	1	1	2	−3	0
Michael Bunting	5	1	0	1	0	2
Kyle Capobianco	2	0	0	0	−2	0
Dakota Mermis	1	0	0	0	1	0
Laurent Dauphin	1	0	0	0	−1	0

=== Goaltenders ===
Regular season
Player	GP	GS	TOI	W	L	OT	GA	GAA	SA	SV%	SO	G	A	PIM
Darcy Kuemper	55	55	3,251:15	27	20	8	126	2.33	1,677	.925	5	0	2	14
Adin Hill	13	11	696:21	7	5	0	32	2.76	322	.906	1	0	0	0
Antti Raanta	12	12	687:06	5	6	0	33	2.88	351	.906	0	0	1	0
Calvin Pickard^{†}	6	4	282:38	0	4	0	17	3.61	157	.892	0	0	0	0
Hunter Miska	1	0	18:16	0	0	0	1	3.28	9	.889	0	0	0	0

^{†}Denotes player spent time with another team before joining the Coyotes. Stats reflect time with the Coyotes only.
^{‡}Denotes player was traded mid-season. Stats reflect time with the Coyotes only.
Bold/italics denotes franchise record.

== Transactions ==
The Coyotes have been involved in the following transactions during the 2018–19 season.

=== Trades ===
Date	Details		Ref
June 23, 2018	To Chicago Blackhawks CGY's 3rd-round pick in 2018	To Arizona Coyotes TOR's 3rd-round pick in 2018; CBJ's 5th-round pick in 2018	
June 23, 2018	To San Jose Sharks TOR's 3rd-round pick in 2018	To Arizona Coyotes 4th-round pick in 2018; 5th-round pick in 2018	
June 24, 2018	To Detroit Red Wings Conditional 7th-round pick in 2019	To Arizona Coyotes Robbie Russo	
July 12, 2018	To Chicago Blackhawks Andrew Campbell; MacKenzie Entwistle; Marcus Kruger; Jordan Maletta; 5th-round pick in 2019	To Arizona Coyotes Vinnie Hinostroza; Marian Hossa; Jordan Oesterle; 3rd-round pick in 2019	
July 18, 2018	To Columbus Blue Jackets Ryan MacInnis	To Arizona Coyotes Jacob Graves; Conditional 6th-round pick in 2019	
November 25, 2018	To Chicago Blackhawks Dylan Strome; Brendan Perlini	To Arizona Coyotes Nick Schmaltz	
December 28, 2018	To Anaheim Ducks Trevor Murphy	To Arizona Coyotes Giovanni Fiore	
January 11, 2019	To Philadelphia Flyers Jacob Graves; 6th-round pick in 2019	To Arizona Coyotes Jordan Weal	
February 8, 2019	To Nashville Predators Laurent Dauphin; Adam Helewka	To Arizona Coyotes Emil Pettersson	
February 25, 2019	To Montreal Canadiens Jordan Weal	To Arizona Coyotes Michael Chaput	

=== Free agents ===
Date	Player	Team	Contract term	Ref
July 1, 2018	Michael Grabner	from New Jersey Devils	3-year	
July 1, 2018	Joel Hanley	to Dallas Stars	1-year	
July 2, 2018	Zac Rinaldo	to Nashville Predators	1-year	
July 2, 2018	Luke Schenn	to Anaheim Ducks	1-year	
August 15, 2018	Pierre-Cedric Labrie	to Wichita Thunder (ECHL)	1-year	
September 11, 2018	Tye McGinn	to Manitoba Moose (AHL)	1-year	
May 15, 2019	Jens Looke	to Timrå IK (HockeyAllsvenskan)	1-year	
May 30, 2019	David Ullstrom	to Dinamo Riga (KHL)	1-year	
June 13, 2019	Emil Pettersson	to Växjö Lakers (SHL)	2-year	

=== Waivers ===
Date	Player	Team	Ref
November 29, 2018	Calvin Pickard	from Philadelphia Flyers	

=== Contract terminations ===
Date	Player	Via	Ref
May 18, 2019	Jens Looke	Mutual termination	

=== Retirement ===
Date	Player	Ref

=== Signings ===
Date	Player	Contract term	Ref
June 27, 2018	Kevin Connauton	2-year	
June 30, 2018	Niklas Hjalmarsson	2-year	
July 1, 2018	Oliver Ekman-Larsson	8-year	
July 3, 2018	Dakota Mermis	1-year	
July 3, 2018	Brad Richardson	2-year	
July 6, 2018	Barrett Hayton	3-year	
July 14, 2018	Michael Bunting	1-year	
July 14, 2018	Laurent Dauphin	1-year	
July 14, 2018	Hudson Fasching	1-year	
July 14, 2018	Trevor Murphy	1-year	
August 9, 2018	Christian Dvorak	6-year	
November 13, 2018	Jakob Chychrun	6-year	
December 10, 2018	Nathan Schnarr	3-year	
February 20, 2019	Jordan Oesterle	2-year	
February 27, 2019	Conor Garland	2-year	
March 15, 2019	Kevin Bahl	3-year	
March 29, 2019	Jan Jenik	3-year	
March 30, 2019	Nick Schmaltz	7-year	
April 5, 2019	Erik Kallgren	2-year	
June 6, 2019	Robbie Russo	1-year	
June 14, 2019	Ilya Lyubushkin	1-year	

== Draft picks ==
Below are the Arizona Coyotes' selections at the 2018 NHL entry draft, which was held on June 22 and 23, 2018, at the American Airlines Center in Dallas, Texas.

Round	#	Player	Pos	Nationality	College/Junior/Club team (League)
1	5	Barrett Hayton	C	Canada	Sault Ste. Marie Greyhounds (OHL)
2	55^{1}	Kevin Bahl	D	Canada	Ottawa 67's (OHL)
3	65	Jan Jenik	RW	Czech Republic	HC Benátky nad Jizerou (Czech 1.Liga)
3	73^{2}	Ty Emberson	D	United States	U.S. NTDP (USHL)
4	114^{3}	Ivan Prosvetov	G	Russia	Youngstown Phantoms (USHL)
5	142^{4}	Michael Callahan	D	United States	Youngstown Phantoms (USHL)
5	145^{3}	Dennis Busby	D	Canada	Flint Firebirds (OHL)
6	158	David Tendeck	G	Canada	Vancouver Giants (WHL)
7	189	Liam Kirk	LW	Great Britain	Sheffield Steelers (EIHL)

Notes:

1. The Minnesota Wild's second-round pick went to the Arizona Coyotes as the result of a trade on February 26, 2017, that sent Martin Hanzal, Ryan White and a fourth-round pick in 2017 to Minnesota in exchange for Grayson Downing, a first-round pick in 2017, a conditional fourth-round pick in 2019 and this pick.
2. The Carolina Hurricanes' third-round pick went to the Arizona Coyotes as the result of a trade on May 3, 2018, that sent Jordan Martinook and a fourth-round pick in 2018 to Carolina in exchange for Marcus Kruger and this pick.
3. The San Jose Sharks' fourth-round and fifth-round picks went to the Arizona Coyotes as the result of a trade on June 23, 2018, that sent Toronto's third-round pick in 2018 (87th overall) to San Jose in exchange for their 2018 fourth-round pick (114th overall) and fifth-round pick (145th overall). Arizona had acquired Toronto's third-round pick in a trade for the Calgary Flames' third-round pick (74th overall), which the Coyotes had as the result of a trade on June 17, 2017, that sent Mike Smith to Calgary in exchange for Chad Johnson, Brandon Hickey and this pick (being conditional at the time of the trade).
4. The Columbus Blue Jackets' fifth-round pick went to the Arizona Coyotes as the result of a trade on June 23, 2018, that sent Calgary's third-round pick in 2018 (74th overall) to Chicago in exchange for Toronto's third-round pick in 2018 (87th overall) and this pick.
