= 2018–19 Vancouver Canucks season =

NHL hockey team season

2018–19 Vancouver Canucks
- Division: 5th Pacific
- Conference: 12th Western
- 2018–19 record: 35–36–11
- Home record: 20–16–5
- Road record: 15–20–6
- Goals for: 225
- Goals against: 254

Team information
- General manager: Jim Benning
- Coach: Travis Green
- Captain: Vacant
- Alternate captains: Michael Del Zotto (Oct. 3 – Jan. 16); Alexander Edler; Bo Horvat; Brandon Sutter; Christopher Tanev
- Arena: Rogers Arena
- Average attendance: 18,022
- Minor league affiliates: Utica Comets (AHL); Kalamazoo Wings (ECHL)

Team leaders
- Goals: Elias Pettersson (28)
- Assists: Elias Pettersson (38)
- Points: Elias Pettersson (66)
- Penalty minutes: Antoine Roussel (118)
- Plus/minus: Troy Stecher (+9)
- Wins: Jacob Markstrom (28)
- Goals against average: Jacob Markstrom (2.77)

The 2018–19 Vancouver Canucks season was the 49th season for the National Hockey League (NHL) franchise that was established on May 22, 1970. On July 25, 2018, president of hockey operations, Trevor Linden left the organization and his role was assumed by general manager Jim Benning. The Canucks were eliminated from playoff contention on March 29, 2019, after the Colorado Avalanche's overtime win against the Arizona Coyotes.

== Off season ==
On June 22, the Canucks drafted Quinn Hughes with the seventh overall pick in the 2018 NHL entry draft. They also selected Jett Woo, Tyler Madden, Toni Utunen, Artyom Manukyan and Matthew Thiessen.

== Standings ==
Pacific Division
Pos	Team	GP	W	L	OTL	ROW	GF	GA	GD	Pts
1	z – Calgary Flames	82	50	25	7	50	289	227	+62	107
2	x – San Jose Sharks	82	46	27	9	46	289	261	+28	101
3	x – Vegas Golden Knights	82	43	32	7	40	249	230	+19	93
4	Arizona Coyotes	82	39	35	8	35	213	223	−10	86
5	Vancouver Canucks	82	35	36	11	29	225	254	−29	81
6	Anaheim Ducks	82	35	37	10	32	199	251	−52	80
7	Edmonton Oilers	82	35	38	9	32	232	274	−42	79
8	Los Angeles Kings	82	31	42	9	28	202	263	−61	71

Source: National Hockey League
x – Clinched playoff spot; z – Clinched conference

Western Conference Wild Card
Pos	Div	Team	GP	W	L	OTL	ROW	GF	GA	GD	Pts
1	CE	x – Dallas Stars	82	43	32	7	42	210	202	+8	93
2	CE	x – Colorado Avalanche	82	38	30	14	36	260	246	+14	90
3	PA	Arizona Coyotes	82	39	35	8	35	213	223	−10	86
4	CE	Chicago Blackhawks	82	36	34	12	33	270	292	−22	84
5	CE	Minnesota Wild	82	37	36	9	36	211	237	−26	83
6	PA	Vancouver Canucks	82	35	36	11	29	225	254	−29	81
7	PA	Anaheim Ducks	82	35	37	10	32	199	251	−52	80
8	PA	Edmonton Oilers	82	35	38	9	32	232	274	−42	79
9	PA	Los Angeles Kings	82	31	42	9	28	202	263	−61	71

Source: National Hockey League
x – Clinched playoff spot

== Schedule and results ==
=== Pre-season ===
The Canucks released their pre-season schedule on June 13, 2018.

2018 pre-season game log: 1–6–0 (Home: 1–3–0; Road: 0–3–0)
#	Date	Visitor	Score	Home	OT	Decision	Attendance	Record	Recap
1	September 18	Edmonton	4–2	Vancouver		Nilsson	–	0–1–0
2	September 19	Calgary	4–1	Vancouver		Demko	15,371	0–2–0
3	September 20	Los Angeles	3–4	Vancouver	SO	Markstrom	15,903	1–2–0
4	September 22	Vancouver	2–5	Calgary		Demko	17,746	1–3–0
5^{[a]}	September 24	Vancouver	1–4	Los Angeles		Markstrom	12,367	1–4–0
6	September 25	Vancouver	0–6	Edmonton		Nilsson	18,347	1–5–0
7^{[b]}	September 29	Arizona	4–1	Vancouver		Markstrom	8,000	1–6–0
Notes:^{a} Game was played at Vivint Smart Home Arena in Salt Lake City, Utah.^{b} Game was played at Prospera Place in Kelowna, British Columbia.

=== Regular season ===
The regular season schedule was released on June 21, 2018.

2018–19 game log

October: 8–6–0 (Home: 4–2–0; Road: 4–4–0)
#	Date	Visitor	Score	Home	OT	Decision	Attendance	Record	Pts	Recap
1	October 3	Calgary	2–5	Vancouver		Markstrom	18,870	1–0–0	2
2	October 6	Vancouver	4–7	Calgary		Markstrom	18,688	1–1–0	2
3	October 9	Vancouver	3–5	Carolina		Markstrom	11,932	1–2–0	2
4	October 11	Vancouver	4–1	Tampa Bay		Nilsson	19,092	2–2–0	4
5	October 13	Vancouver	3–2	Florida		Nilsson	11,953	3–2–0	6
6	October 16	Vancouver	3–2	Pittsburgh	OT	Nilsson	18,492	4–2–0	8
7	October 18	Vancouver	1–4	Winnipeg		Nilsson	15,321	4–3–0	8
8	October 20	Boston	1–2	Vancouver	OT	Markstrom	17,871	5–3–0	10
9	October 22	Washington	5–2	Vancouver		Nilsson	17,227	5–4–0	10
10	October 24	Vancouver	3–2	Vegas	SO	Markstrom	18,189	6–4–0	12
11	October 25	Vancouver	1–4	Arizona		Nilsson	12,955	6–5–0	12
12	October 27	Pittsburgh	5–0	Vancouver		Markstrom	17,537	6–6–0	12
13	October 29	Minnesota	2–5	Vancouver		Markstrom	16,546	7–6–0	14
14	October 31	Chicago	2–4	Vancouver		Markstrom	16,955	8–6–0	16

November: 3–8–3 (Home: 1–3–1; Road: 2–5–2)
#	Date	Visitor	Score	Home	OT	Decision	Attendance	Record	Pts	Recap
15	November 2	Colorado	6–7	Vancouver	OT	Markstrom	18,334	9–6–0	18
16	November 6	Vancouver	2–3	Detroit	SO	Markstrom	18,640	9–6–1	19
17	November 8	Vancouver	8–5	Boston		Markstrom	17,565	10–6–1	21
18	November 10	Vancouver	3–4	Buffalo	SO	Markstrom	17,541	10–6–2	22
19	November 12	Vancouver	1–2	NY Rangers		Markstrom	17,100	10–7–2	22
20	November 13	Vancouver	2–5	NY Islanders		Markstrom	8,806	10–8–2	22
21	November 15	Vancouver	2–6	Minnesota		Bachman	19,014	10–9–2	22
22	November 17	Montreal	3–2	Vancouver		Markstrom	17,880	10–10–2	22
23	November 19	Winnipeg	6–3	Vancouver		Markstrom	17,917	10–11–2	22
24	November 21	Vancouver	3–4	Anaheim		Markstrom	16,091	10–12–2	22
25	November 23	Vancouver	0–4	San Jose		Nilsson	17,056	10–13–2	22
26	November 24	Vancouver	4–2	Los Angeles		Markstrom	17,725	11–13–2	24
27	November 27	Los Angeles	2–1	Vancouver	OT	Markstrom	17,790	11–13–3	25
28	November 29	Vegas	4–3	Vancouver		Markstrom	16,880	11–14–3	25

December: 8–5–1 (Home: 4–4–0; Road: 4–1–1)
#	Date	Visitor	Score	Home	OT	Decision	Attendance	Record	Pts	Recap
29	December 1	Dallas	2–1	Vancouver		Nilsson	17,387	11–15–3	25
30	December 4	Minnesota	3–2	Vancouver		Nilsson	17,122	11–16–3	25
31	December 6	Nashville	3–5	Vancouver		Markstrom	16,894	12–16–3	27
32	December 9	Vancouver	6–1	St. Louis		Markstrom	16,841	13–16–3	29
33	December 11	Vancouver	3–2	Columbus		Markstrom	14,689	14–16–3	31
34	December 13	Vancouver	3–4	Nashville	OT	Nilsson	17,206	14–16–4	32
35	December 15	Philadelphia	1–5	Vancouver		Markstrom	17,328	15–16–4	34
36	December 16	Edmonton	2–4	Vancouver		Markstrom	18,036	16–16–4	36
37	December 18	Tampa Bay	5–2	Vancouver		Nilsson	17,193	16–17–4	36
38	December 20	St. Louis	1–5	Vancouver		Markstrom	18,261	17–17–4	38
39	December 22	Winnipeg	1–0	Vancouver		Markstrom	18,028	17–18–4	38
40	December 27	Vancouver	4–2	Edmonton		Markstrom	18,347	18–18–4	40
41	December 29	Vancouver	3–2	Calgary	OT	Markstrom	19,289	19–18–4	42
42	December 31	Vancouver	0–4	New Jersey		Nilsson	15,772	19–19–4	42

January: 4–3–2 (Home: 3–1–2; Road: 1–2–0)
#	Date	Visitor	Score	Home	OT	Decision	Attendance	Record	Pts	Recap
43	January 2	Vancouver	4–3	Ottawa	OT	Markstrom	16,358	20–19–4	44
44	January 3	Vancouver	0–2	Montreal		Markstrom	21,302	20–20–4	44
45	January 5	Vancouver	0–5	Toronto		Markstrom	19,388	20–21–4	44
46	January 10	Arizona	4–3	Vancouver	OT	Markstrom	18,527	20–21–5	45
47	January 13	Florida	1–5	Vancouver		Markstrom	18,610	21–21–5	47
48	January 16	Edmonton	3–2	Vancouver	SO	Markstrom	18,166	21–21–6	48
49	January 18	Buffalo	3–4	Vancouver		Demko	18,176	22–21–6	50
50	January 20	Detroit	2–3	Vancouver		Markstrom	18,865	23–21–6	52
51	January 23	Carolina	5–2	Vancouver		Markstrom	18,373	23–22–6	52

February: 4–7–3 (Home: 2–2–1; Road: 2–5–2)
#	Date	Visitor	Score	Home	OT	Decision	Attendance	Record	Pts	Recap
52	February 2	Vancouver	5–1	Colorado		Markstrom	18,027	24–22–6	54
53	February 4	Vancouver	1–2	Philadelphia		Markstrom	18,671	24–23–6	54
54	February 5	Vancouver	2–3	Washington		Markstrom	18,506	24–24–6	54
55	February 7	Vancouver	3–4	Chicago	OT	Markstrom	21,540	24–24–7	55
56	February 9	Calgary	3–4	Vancouver	SO	Markstrom	18,410	25–24–7	57
57	February 11	San Jose	7–2	Vancouver		DiPietro	18,576	25–25–7	57
58	February 13	Vancouver	0–1	Anaheim		Markstrom	17,174	25–26–7	57
59	February 14	Vancouver	4–3	Los Angeles	SO	Markstrom	18,230	26–26–7	59
60	February 16	Vancouver	2–3	San Jose		Markstrom	17,562	26–27–7	59
61	February 21	Arizona	3–2	Vancouver	OT	Markstrom	18,568	26–27–8	60
62	February 23	NY Islanders	4–0	Vancouver		Markstrom	18,871	26–28–8	60
63	February 25	Anaheim	0–4	Vancouver		Markstrom	18,542	27–28–8	62
64	February 27	Vancouver	2–3	Colorado	SO	Markstrom	14,867	27–28–9	63
65	February 28	Vancouver	2–5	Arizona		Demko	12,767	27–29–9	63

March: 7–6–1 (Home: 5–4–1; Road: 2–2–0)
#	Date	Visitor	Score	Home	OT	Decision	Attendance	Record	Pts	Recap
66	March 3	Vancouver	0–3	Vegas		Markstrom	18,303	27–30–9	63
67	March 6	Toronto	2–3	Vancouver	OT	Markstrom	18,871	28–30–9	65
68	March 7	Vancouver	2–3	Edmonton		Demko	18,347	28–31–9	65
69	March 9	Vegas	6–2	Vancouver		Markstrom	18,286	28–32–9	65
70	March 13	NY Rangers	1–4	Vancouver		Markstrom	18,225	29–32–9	67
71	March 15	New Jersey	3–2	Vancouver	SO	Markstrom	17,552	29–32–10	68
72	March 17	Vancouver	3–2	Dallas	SO	Markstrom	18,125	30–32–10	70
73	March 18	Vancouver	3–2	Chicago	OT	Demko	21,496	31–32–10	72
74	March 20	Ottawa	4–7	Vancouver		Markstrom	18,500	32–32–10	74
75	March 23	Calgary	3–1	Vancouver		Markstrom	18,685	32–33–10	74
76	March 24	Columbus	5–0	Vancouver		Demko	17,805	32–34–10	74
77	March 26	Anaheim	5–4	Vancouver		Markstrom	17,633	32–35–10	74
78	March 28	Los Angeles	2–3	Vancouver	SO	Demko	18,524	33–35–10	76
79	March 30	Dallas	2–3	Vancouver	SO	Markstrom	18,663	34–35–10	78

April: 1–1–1 (Home: 1–0–0; Road: 0–1–1)
#	Date	Visitor	Score	Home	OT	Decision	Attendance	Record	Pts	Recap
80	April 2	San Jose	2–4	Vancouver		Demko	18,524	35–35–10	80
81	April 4	Vancouver	2–3	Nashville		Markstrom	17,669	35–36–10	80
82	April 6	Vancouver	2–3	St. Louis	SO	Demko	17,970	35–36–11	81

Legend: Win (2 points) Loss (0 points) Overtime/shootout loss (1 point)

=== Detailed records ===
Western Conference
Opponent	Home	Away	Total	Pts	GF	GA
Central Division
Chicago Blackhawks	1–0–0	1–0–1	2–0–1	5	10	8
Colorado Avalanche	1–0–0	1–0–1	2–0–1	5	14	10
Dallas Stars	1–1–0	1–0–0	2–1–0	4	7	6
Minnesota Wild	1–1–0	0–1–0	1–2–0	2	9	11
Nashville Predators	1–0–0	0–1–1	1–1–1	3	10	10
St. Louis Blues	1–0–0	1–0–1	2–0–1	5	13	5
Winnipeg Jets	0–2–0	0–1–0	0–3–0	0	4	8
Total	6–4–0	4–3–4	10–7–4	24	67	61
Pacific Division
Anaheim Ducks	1–1–0	0–2–0	1–3–0	2	11	10
Arizona Coyotes	0–0–2	0–2–0	0–2–2	2	8	16
Calgary Flames	2–1–0	1–1–0	3–2–0	6	17	17
Edmonton Oilers	1–0–1	1–1–0	2–1–1	5	12	10
Los Angeles Kings	1–0–1	2–0–0	3–0–1	7	12	9
San Jose Sharks	1–1–0	0–2–0	1–3–0	2	8	16
Vancouver Canucks	—	—	—	—	—	—
Vegas Golden Knights	0–2–0	1–1–0	1–3–0	2	8	15
Total	6–5–4	5–9–0	11–14–4	26	76	93

Eastern Conference
Opponent	Home	Away	Total	Pts	GF	GA
Atlantic Division
Boston Bruins	1–0–0	1–0–0	2–0–0	4	10	5
Buffalo Sabres	1–0–0	0–0–1	1–0–1	3	7	7
Detroit Red Wings	1–0–0	0–0–1	1–0–1	3	5	5
Florida Panthers	1–0–0	1–0–0	2–0–0	4	8	3
Montreal Canadiens	0–1–0	0–1–0	0–2–0	0	2	5
Ottawa Senators	1–0–0	1–0–0	2–0–0	4	11	7
Tampa Bay Lightning	0–1–0	1–0–0	1–1–0	2	6	6
Toronto Maple Leafs	1–0–0	0–1–0	1–1–0	2	3	7
Total	6–2–0	4–2–2	10–4–2	22	52	46
Metropolitan Division
Carolina Hurricanes	0–1–0	0–1–0	0–2–0	0	5	10
Columbus Blue Jackets	0–1–0	1–0–0	1–1–0	2	3	7
New Jersey Devils	0–0–1	0–1–0	0–1–1	1	2	7
New York Islanders	0–1–0	0–1–0	0–2–0	0	2	9
New York Rangers	1–0–0	0–1–0	1–1–0	2	5	3
Philadelphia Flyers	1–0–0	0–1–0	1–1–0	2	6	3
Pittsburgh Penguins	0–1–0	1–0–0	1–1–0	2	3	7
Washington Capitals	0–1–0	0–1–0	0–2–0	0	4	8
Total	2–5–1	2–6–0	4–11–1	9	30	54

== Player statistics ==
Final stats

=== Skaters ===
Regular season
Player	GP	G	A	Pts	+/−	PIM
Elias Pettersson	71	28	38	66	3	12
Bo Horvat	82	27	34	61	−4	33
Brock Boeser	69	26	30	56	−2	22
Alexander Edler	56	10	24	34	3	54
Antoine Roussel	65	9	22	31	5	118
Loui Eriksson	81	11	18	29	−11	22
Nikolay Goldobin	63	7	20	27	−10	18
Jake Virtanen	70	15	10	25	−4	44
Troy Stecher	78	2	21	23	9	32
Markus Granlund	77	12	10	22	−4	20
Ben Hutton	69	5	15	20	−23	43
Josh Leivo^{†}	49	10	8	18	4	25
Tyler Motte	74	9	7	16	−12	10
Alex Biega	41	2	14	16	0	22
Sven Baertschi	26	9	5	14	−9	6
Jay Beagle	57	3	10	13	−8	18
Tanner Pearson^{†}	19	9	3	12	0	4
Adam Gaudette	56	5	7	12	−8	18
Derrick Pouliot	62	3	9	12	−1	30
Christopher Tanev	55	2	10	12	3	18
Tim Schaller	47	3	7	10	−2	9
Erik Gudbranson^{‡}	57	2	6	8	−27	83
Brandon Sutter	26	4	2	6	−12	6
Brendan Leipsic^{‡}	17	2	3	5	−10	2
Michael Del Zotto^{‡}	23	1	3	4	3	8
Ryan Spooner^{†}	11	0	4	4	−1	0
Sam Gagner^{‡}	7	1	2	3	−3	4
Brendan Gaunce	3	1	2	3	3	0
Quinn Hughes	5	0	3	3	0	2
Darren Archibald^{‡}	9	1	1	2	−1	12
Luke Schenn^{†}	18	0	2	2	−4	9
Ashton Sautner	17	0	1	1	−2	2
Zack MacEwen	4	0	1	1	−4	5
Brogan Rafferty	2	0	0	0	−1	0
Guillaume Brisebois	8	0	0	0	−4	0
Reid Boucher	1	0	0	0	0	0
Josh Teves	1	0	0	0	−1	2

=== Goaltenders ===
Regular season
Player	GP	GS	TOI	W	L	OT	GA	GAA	SA	SV%	SO	G	A	PIM
Jacob Markstrom	60	60	3,599:21	28	23	9	166	2.77	1,896	.912	1	0	3	2
Thatcher Demko	9	8	534:09	4	3	1	25	2.81	288	.913	0	0	1	0
Anders Nilsson^{‡}	12	12	717:56	3	8	1	37	3.09	353	.895	0	0	0	0
Richard Bachman	1	1	60:00	0	1	0	6	6.00	29	.793	0	0	0	0
Michael DiPietro	1	1	60:00	0	1	0	7	7.00	24	.708	0	0	0	0

^{†}Denotes player spent time with another team before joining the Canucks. Stats reflect time with the Canucks only.
^{‡}Denotes player was traded mid-season. Stats reflect time with the Canucks only.
Bold/italics denotes franchise record.

== Awards and honours ==
=== Awards ===
Regular season
Player	Award	Awarded
Elias Pettersson	NHL Rookie of the Month for October	November 1, 2018
Elias Pettersson	NHL Second Star of the Week	November 5, 2018
Elias Pettersson	NHL First Star of the Week	December 10, 2018
Elias Pettersson	NHL Rookie of the Month for December	January 2, 2019
Elias Pettersson	NHL All-Star game selection	January 2, 2019

=== Milestones ===
Regular season
Player	Milestone	Reached
Elias Pettersson	1st career NHL game 1st career NHL goal 1st career NHL assist 1st career NHL point	October 3, 2018
Bo Horvat	300th career NHL game	October 13, 2018
Erik Gudbranson	400th career NHL game	October 22, 2018
Christopher Tanev	400th career NHL game	October 24, 2018
Adam Gaudette	1st career NHL assist 1st career NHL point	October 25, 2018
Bo Horvat	100th career NHL assist	November 21, 2018
Adam Gaudette	1st career NHL goal	November 24, 2018
Brock Boeser	100th career NHL game	December 31, 2018
Elias Pettersson	1st career NHL hat-trick	January 2, 2019
Josh Leivo	100th career NHL game	January 16, 2019
Bo Horvat	200th career NHL point	January 18, 2019
Jay Beagle	500th career NHL game	February 4, 2019
Michael DiPietro	1st career NHL game	February 11, 2019
Zack MacEwen	1st career NHL game 1st career NHL assist 1st career NHL point	February 11, 2019
Guillaume Brisebois	1st career NHL game	February 14, 2019
Loui Eriksson	900th career NHL game	February 16, 2019
Brock Boeser	100th career NHL point	February 16, 2019
Troy Stecher	200th career NHL game	February 28, 2019
Alexander Edler	800th career NHL game	March 7, 2019
Jake Virtanen	200th career NHL game	March 13, 2019
Josh Teves	1st career NHL game	March 26, 2019
Quinn Hughes	1st career NHL game 1st career NHL assist 1st career NHL point	March 28, 2019
Brogan Rafferty	1st career NHL game	April 4, 2019
Markus Granlund	300th career NHL game	April 4, 2019

=== Records ===
Player	Record	Date
Alexander Edler	Most games played by Canucks defenceman	December 22, 2018
Elias Pettersson	Most points by Canucks rookie in single season	March 18, 2019
Alexander Edler	Most goals scored by Canucks defenceman	March 28, 2018

== Transactions ==
The Canucks have been involved in the following transactions during the 2018–19 season.

=== Trades ===
Date	Details		Ref
June 23, 2018	To Washington Capitals 6th-round pick in 2018	To Vancouver Canucks 6th-round pick in 2018; 6th-round pick in 2019	
June 24, 2018	To Chicago Blackhawks Michael Chaput	To Vancouver Canucks Tanner Kero	
December 3, 2018	To Toronto Maple Leafs Michael Carcone	To Vancouver Canucks Josh Leivo	
January 2, 2019	To Ottawa Senators Darren Archibald; Anders Nilsson	To Vancouver Canucks Mike McKenna; Tom Pyatt; 6th-round pick in 2019	
January 16, 2019	To Anaheim Ducks Michael Del Zotto	To Vancouver Canucks Luke Schenn; 7th-round pick in 2020	
February 12, 2019	To New York Rangers 7th-round pick in 2020	To Vancouver Canucks Marek Mazanec	
February 16, 2019	To Edmonton Oilers Sam Gagner	To Vancouver Canucks Ryan Spooner	
February 25, 2019	To Pittsburgh Penguins Erik Gudbranson	To Vancouver Canucks Tanner Pearson	
February 25, 2019	To San Jose Sharks Jonathan Dahlen	To Vancouver Canucks Linus Karlsson	

=== Free agents ===
Date	Player	Team	Contract term	Ref
July 1, 2018	Jay Beagle	from Washington Capitals	4-year	
July 1, 2018	Nic Dowd	to Washington Capitals	1-year	
July 1, 2018	Antoine Roussel	from Dallas Stars	4-year	
July 1, 2018	Tim Schaller	from Boston Bruins	2-year	
July 2, 2018	Jayson Megna	to Washington Capitals	1-year	
July 5, 2018	Griffen Molino	to Toronto Marlies (AHL)	Unknown	
July 9, 2018	Patrick Wiercioch	to Dinamo Minsk (KHL)	Unknown	
July 31, 2018	Cole Cassels	to Grizzlys Wolfsburg (DEL)	1-year	
August 20, 2018	Joseph LaBate	to Belleville Senators (AHL)	1-year	
September 5, 2018	Mackenze Stewart	to Toledo Walleye (ECHL)	1-year	
December 14, 2018	Mitch Eliot	from Sarnia Sting (OHL)	3-year	
February 19, 2019	Michael Leighton	from Utica Comets (AHL)	1-year	
March 12, 2019	Josh Teves	from Princeton Tigers (ECAC Hockey)	1-year	
April 1, 2019	Jake Kielly	from Clarkson Golden Knights (ECAC Hockey)	2-year	
April 1, 2019	Brogan Rafferty	from Quinnipiac Bobcats (ECAC Hockey)	1-year	

=== Waivers ===
Date	Player	Team	Ref
December 3, 2018	Brendan Leipsic	to Los Angeles Kings	
January 4, 2019	Mike McKenna	to Philadelphia Flyers	

=== Contract terminations ===
Date	Player	Via	Ref

=== Retirement ===
Date	Player	Ref
April 7, 2018	Daniel Sedin	
April 7, 2018	Henrik Sedin	

=== Signings ===
Date	Player	Contract term	Ref
June 22, 2018	Markus Granlund	1-year	
June 26, 2018	Derrick Pouliot	1-year	
July 1, 2018	Sven Bartschi	3-year	
July 3, 2018	Darren Archibald	1-year	
July 20, 2018	Troy Stecher	2-year	
July 25, 2018	Jake Virtanen	2-year	
March 10, 2019	Quinn Hughes	3-year	
March 17, 2019	Jett Woo	3-year	
April 24, 2019	Thatcher Demko	2-year	
June 20, 2019	Alexander Edler	2-year	

== Draft picks ==
Below are the Vancouver Canucks' selections at the 2018 NHL entry draft, which was held on June 22 and 23, 2018, at the American Airlines Center in Dallas, Texas.

Round	#	Player	Pos	Nationality	College/Junior/Club team (League)
1	7	Quinn Hughes	D	United States	University of Michigan (B1G)
2	37	Jett Woo	D	Canada	Moose Jaw Warriors (WHL)
3	68	Tyler Madden	C	United States	Tri-City Storm (USHL)
5	130	Toni Utunen	D	Finland	LeKi (Mestis)
6	186^{1}	Artyom Manukyan	RW	Russia	Avangard Omsk (KHL)
7	192	Matthew Thiessen	G	Canada	Steinbach Pistons (MJHL)

Notes:

1. The Washington Capitals' sixth-round pick went to the Vancouver Canucks as the result of a trade on June 23, 2018, that sent a sixth-round pick in 2018 (161st overall) to Washington in exchange for a sixth-round pick in 2019 and this pick.
