= Jimmy Lodge =

English footballer

Personal information
- Full name: James William Lodge
- Date of birth: 11 January 1895
- Place of birth: Felling, County Durham, England
- Date of death: 24 October 1971 (aged 76)
- Height: 5 ft 8 in (1.73 m)
- Position: Full-back

Senior career*
Years	Team	Apps	(Gls)
- Cox Lodge
- Scotswood
- Newburn
1920–1924	Hull City	81	(0)
1924–1925	Halifax Town	42	(0)
1925	Nuneaton Town		
1925–1926	York City	19	(0)
Total		142	(0)
- * Club domestic league appearances and goals

James William Lodge (11 January 1895 – 24 October 1971), also known as Jimmy Barrass, was an English professional footballer who played as a full-back in the Football League for Hull City and Halifax Town, and in non-League football for Cox Lodge, Scotswood, Newburn, Nuneaton Town and York City. He later worked as assistant trainer and specialist masseur at Hull.
