= Mike Liambas =

Canadian professional ice hockey forward (born 1989)

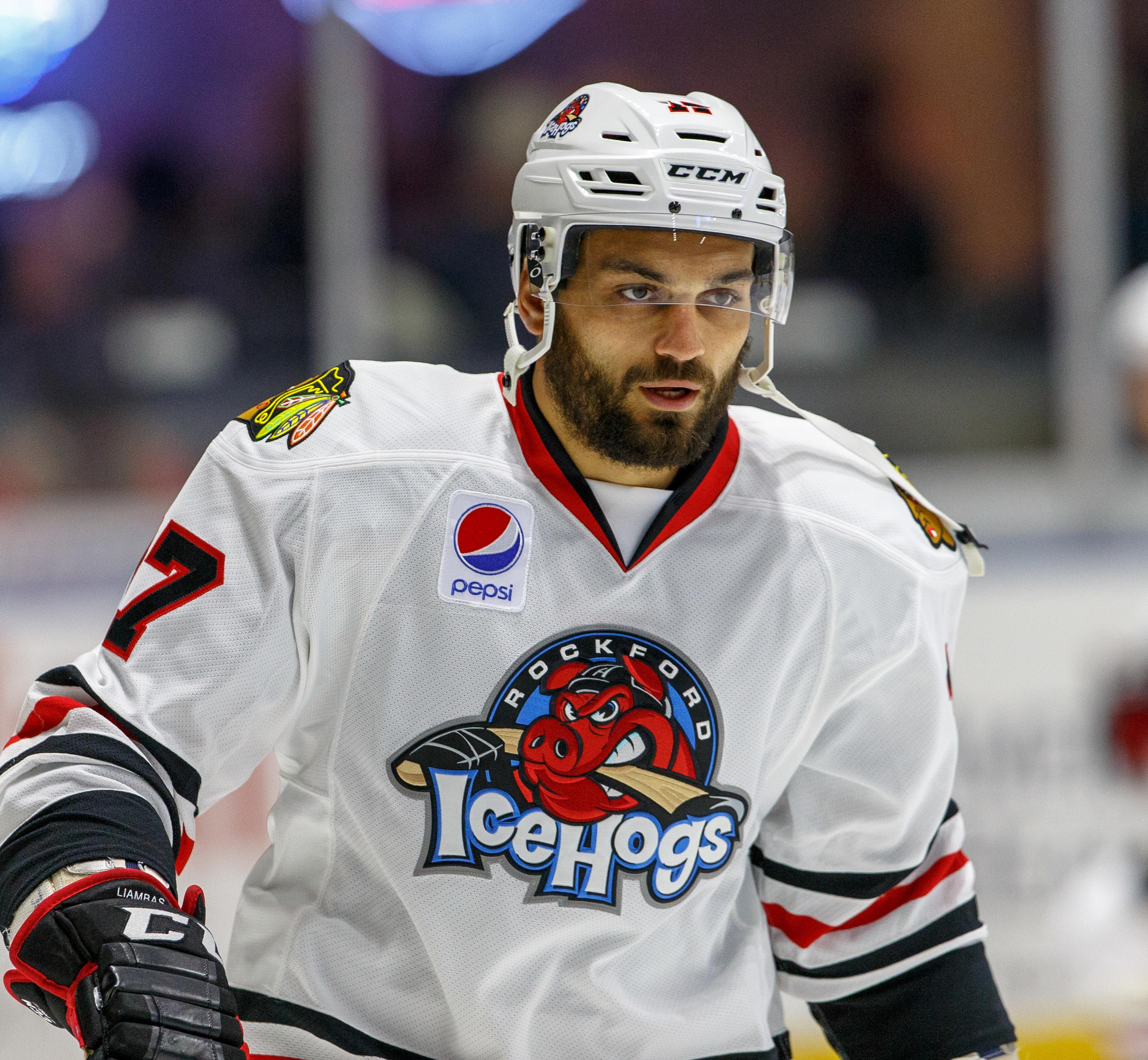
- Liambas in 2015
- Born: February 16, 1989 (age 37) Woodbridge, Ontario, Canada
- Height: 5 ft 10 in (178 cm)
- Weight: 193 lb (88 kg; 13 st 11 lb)
- Position: Left wing
- Shot: Left
- Played for: Nashville Predators; Anaheim Ducks
- NHL draft: Undrafted
- Playing career: 2009–2020

Michael Liambas (born February 16, 1989) is a Canadian professional ice hockey forward. He is currently an unrestricted free agent who most recently played with the Iowa Wild in the American Hockey League (AHL) while under contract with the Minnesota Wild organization of the National Hockey League (NHL). He made his debut in the NHL during the 2016–17 season, with the Nashville Predators. He is also the younger brother to Will Liambas and older brother to Steven Liambas.

== Playing career ==
=== Junior ===
Liambas began his junior hockey career in the Ontario Provincial Junior A Hockey League (OPJHL) with the St. Michael's Buzzers. He joined the major junior ranks in 2006–07 with the Erie Otters of the Ontario Hockey League (OHL). Liambas underwent hip surgery in December 2008 and was subsequently sidelined for much of the 2008–09 season. He appeared in just five games during his third OHL season before the injury, not returning to the Otters line-up until the playoffs. Following the Otters' elimination, he was signed to a professional contract with the Bloomington PrairieThunder of the IHL on March 31, 2009. Liambas played the final eight games of the 2008–09 season for the PrairieThunder, scoring one goal, but returned to the OHL for a fourth season with the Otters as an overage player in 2009–10.

==== Controversial hit on Ben Fanelli ====
During a game against the Kitchener Rangers on October 30, 2009, Liambas delivered a devastating check to the head of opposing sixteen-year-old defenceman Ben Fanelli. As Liambas checked Fanelli into the boards behind the Rangers net, Fanelli's head hit a metal partition in the glass, breaking and knocking off his helmet. Fanelli lay unconscious while twitching and foaming at the mouth before being rushed to the hospital in critical condition with skull and orbital bone fractures. Liambas attempted to visit him in the hospital, but was not allowed in. Fanelli was released from Hamilton General Hospital a week later on November 6, and he rejoined the Rangers two years later after recovering from the resulting brain injury.

==== Suspension ====
Four days after the hit, on November 4, Liambas was suspended by OHL commissioner David Branch for the remainder of the regular season and playoffs, effectively ending Liambas' junior career. Branch cited the speed and distance to which Liambas skated to deliver the check, as well as the severity of Fanelli's injuries. He commented that the suspension was responding to a "need to take strong steps to ... send out the message to all our players and minor hockey players that we have to be ... more respectful of our opponent."

Otters general manager Sherwood Bassin was quick to come to Liambas' defence following the suspension, expressing surprise at the severity of the penalty from Branch. Bassin asserted that Liambas was not simply a "goofball kid", citing his 95 percent average in high school, as well as volunteer work in initiating a stay-in-school program for kids and at the Shriners Hospital for Children in Erie. Liambas expressed regret during the hearing for his hit and commented that he did not know if he could deliver bodychecks any more as a hockey player.

=== Professional ===
Having been suspended in his final year of junior eligibility, Liambas re-signed with the Bloomington Prairie Thunder (for whom he briefly played earlier in the year) on December 3, 2009. The following year, Liambas was invited by the Toronto Maple Leafs to their rookie camp. Liambas then attended the Maple Leafs' training camp on an amateur try-out contract. He was released from camp on September 23, 2010.

In October 2010, Liambas joined the hockey team at the University of British Columbia, where he studied Human Kinetics. Following a suspension in late February 2011 for instigating and fighting in an altercation with Alberta Golden Bears forward Eric Hunter, Liambas signed with the ECHL's Cincinnati Cyclones, with whom he finished the season and skated in the Kelly Cup playoffs. Liambas re-signed with the Cyclones for the 2011–12 ECHL season on July 14, 2011. The following season, Liambas appeared in only one game with the Cyclones before being traded to the Orlando Solar Bears on October 30, 2012. Liambas would also appear in 27 games for the Milwaukee Admirals in the 2012-13 season. He would remain with the admirals for another two seasons. On July 2, 2015, Liambas was signed to his first NHL contract, agreeing to a one-year, two-way contract with the Chicago Blackhawks.

At the conclusion of the season, Liambas was not tendered a qualifying offer to remain with the Blackhawks. As a free agent on July 3, 2016, Liambas agreed to a one-year, two-way deal with the Nashville Predators. Marking a return to the affiliates of the Predators in the Milwaukee Admirals.

On July 1, 2017, Liambas left the Predators as a free agent and signed a one-year, two-way contract with the Anaheim Ducks. During the 2017–18 season, Liambas was recalled from AHL affiliate, the San Diego Gulls, and appeared in an NHL high 7 games while registering his first NHL point, an assist. He was injured with the Ducks before later returning to play out the remainder of the season with the Gulls.

On July 1, 2018, Liambas again as a free agent, secured a two-year, two-way contract with the Minnesota Wild.

== Career statistics ==
			Regular season					Playoffs
Season	Team	League	GP	G	A	Pts	PIM	GP	G	A	Pts	PIM
2004–05	St. Michael's Buzzers	OPJHL	5	1	0	1	16	—	—	—	—	—
2006–07	Erie Otters	OHL	55	4	1	5	169	—	—	—	—	—
2007–08	Erie Otters	OHL	60	0	5	5	169	—	—	—	—	—
2008–09	Erie Otters	OHL	5	1	0	1	2	5	0	0	0	6
2008–09	Bloomington PrairieThunder	IHL	8	1	0	1	31	—	—	—	—	—
2009–10	Erie Otters	OHL	4	0	2	2	17	—	—	—	—	—
2009–10	Bloomington PrairieThunder	IHL	17	0	3	3	115	—	—	—	—	—
2010–11	University of British Columbia	CWUAA	25	3	6	9	82	—	—	—	—	—
2010–11	Cincinnati Cyclones	ECHL	15	1	1	2	72	4	0	2	2	8
2011–12	Cincinnati Cyclones	ECHL	39	0	9	9	160	—	—	—	—	—
2012–13	Cincinnati Cyclones	ECHL	1	0	1	1	20	—	—	—	—	—
2012–13	Orlando Solar Bears	ECHL	32	2	7	9	151	—	—	—	—	—
2012–13	Milwaukee Admirals	AHL	27	1	0	1	74	2	0	1	1	32
2013–14	Milwaukee Admirals	AHL	60	3	5	8	267	2	0	0	0	2
2014–15	Milwaukee Admirals	AHL	54	5	3	8	158	—	—	—	—	—
2015–16	Rockford IceHogs	AHL	44	1	1	2	188	3	0	0	0	16
2016–17	Milwaukee Admirals	AHL	72	3	8	11	149	3	0	0	0	2
2016–17	Nashville Predators	NHL	1	0	0	0	0	—	—	—	—	—
2017–18	San Diego Gulls	AHL	40	4	3	7	104	—	—	—	—	—
2017–18	Anaheim Ducks	NHL	7	0	1	1	21	—	—	—	—	—
2018–19	Iowa Wild	AHL	53	4	6	10	137	11	1	2	3	12
2019–20	Iowa Wild	AHL	43	3	2	5	68	—	—	—	—	—
NHL totals			8	0	1	1	21	—	—	—	—	—
