= 2018–19 Tampa Bay Lightning season =

NHL team season

2018–19 Tampa Bay Lightning
- Presidents' Trophy winners
- Atlantic Division champions
- Division: 1st Atlantic
- Conference: 1st Eastern
- 2018–19 record: 62–16–4
- Home record: 32–7–2
- Road record: 30–9–2
- Goals for: 325
- Goals against: 222

Team information
- General manager: Julien BriseBois
- Coach: Jon Cooper
- Captain: Steven Stamkos
- Alternate captains: Ryan Callahan; Victor Hedman; Ryan McDonagh; Anton Stralman
- Arena: Amalie Arena
- Average attendance: 19,092
- Minor league affiliates: Syracuse Crunch (AHL); Orlando Solar Bears (ECHL)

Team leaders
- Goals: Steven Stamkos (45)
- Assists: Nikita Kucherov (87)
- Points: Nikita Kucherov (128)
- Penalty minutes: Cedric Paquette (80)
- Plus/minus: Ryan McDonagh (+38)
- Wins: Andrei Vasilevskiy (39)
- Goals against average: Andrei Vasilevskiy (2.40)

The 2018–19 Tampa Bay Lightning season was the 27th season for the National Hockey League (NHL) franchise that was established on December 16, 1991. The team clinched a playoff spot on March 8, 2019, when the Montreal Canadiens lost 8–2 to the Anaheim Ducks. This season marked the first time that Tampa won the Presidents' Trophy in franchise history, winning the Atlantic Division for the second consecutive year as well, their fourth division title overall. They also became the second team in league history to win 62 games, matching the record set by the 1995–96 Detroit Red Wings, with the 2022–23 Boston Bruins later setting a new NHL record with their 63rd win on April 8, 2023. Their record-setting season ended abruptly when they became the first Presidents' Trophy winner to get swept in the first round of the playoffs, losing to the Columbus Blue Jackets, making them the only President's Trophy champion to date to not win a single playoff game. This was also the first time since 2014 that the Lightning were eliminated from the Stanley Cup playoffs in the first round. In addition, this was the second time the Lightning were swept in the first round by a lower seeded team; the first time also being 2014, against the Canadiens. Following this elimination, the Lightning would then go on to do three straight Stanley Cup Final trips after this season.

== Off-season ==
=== May ===
On May 23, 2018, the Lightning's 2017–18 season ended when they were defeated by the eventual Stanley Cup champion Washington Capitals in game seven of the Eastern Conference finals. The loss was a 4-0 defeat at Amalie Arena.

On May 31, 2018, the Lightning announced that it was parting ways with assistant coaches Rick Bowness and Brad Lauer. Bowness had been an assistant since 2013. He was responsible for the defense and the penalty kill. Lauer had been a member of the Lighting's coaching staff since 2015.

=== June ===
On June 7, 2018, the Lightning announced the re-signing of defensive prospect Daniel Walcott to a one-year contract extension. Walcott spent the entire season with the Syracuse Crunch of the American Hockey League (AHL). Walcot appeared in 62-games, recording five goals and 16 points.

On June 12, 2018, the Lightning announced the re-signing of forward prospect Carter Verhaeghe to a one-year contract extension. Verhaeghe spent his season with the Crunch, where he played in 58 games and scored 17 goals and 48 points.

On June 13, 2018, the Lightning announced backup goaltender Peter Budaj had been traded to the Los Angeles Kings in exchange for forward Andy Andreoff. Andreoff has appeared in 159 NHL games over the last four seasons. During that time, he has 13 goals and 262 career hits.

On June 18, 2018, the Lighting announced the signing of Edward Pasquale to a one-year contract. Pasquale split his season in the AHL between the Syracuse Crunch and the Bakersfield Condors. He was originally acquired by the Lightning via trade with the Edmonton Oilers during the 2017–18 season.

On June 20, 2018, Victor Hedman won the James Norris Memorial Trophy for the 2017–18 NHL season. The award is given annually to the top defenseman that season, which is based upon the votes of the Professional Hockey Writers' Association. Hedman was the first defenseman in Lightning history to win the award. Additionally, Hedman and Nikita Kucherov were named as First Team All-Stars for the season.

On June 22, 2018, the Lightning announced the re-signing of backup goaltender Louis Domingue to a two-year contract extension. Domingue went 7–3–1 over 11 starts with the Lightning. He was acquired by the Lightning during the 2017–18 season in a trade from the Arizona Coyotes.

On the same day, the Lightning named Jeff Halpern as an assistant coach. During the last two seasons, Halpern worked as an assistant coach with the Syracuse Crunch. It was unknown at the time whether the Lightning would be hiring an additional assistant to replace the last remaining vacancy left by the departure of assistants Rick Bowness and Brad Lauer.

On June 24, 2018, the Lightning released the roster for its 2018 Development Camp Roster. The roster consisted of 27 players, which included six of the seven players selected in the 2018 NHL entry draft. Six players participating played for the Crunch last season. There were also five forwards participating in the camp as invitees. Notable camp attendees include Cal Foote, Connor Ingram, Boris Katchouk and Taylor Raddysh.

On June 25, 2018, the Lightning issued qualifying offers to Adam Erne, Slater Koekkoek, J. T. Miller and Cedric Paquette, allowing the Lightning to retain those players' playing rights. These rights entail the right match any contract offered to those players after the free agency period begins or draft compensation if the team declines to match the contract offered to the player.

On June 26, 2018, the Lightning announced it had signed forward prospect Ross Colton to a two-year contract. Colton spent the past two seasons playing for the University of Vermont. During that time, Colton led Vermont in goals, scoring 28 goals and 50 points in 69 games. Colton was originally drafted by the Lightning in the fourth round of the 2016 NHL entry draft.

It was announced Tom Kurvers had left the Lightning after ten years to become the new assistant general manager of the Minnesota Wild. The last seven years of his tenure with the team had been as a senior advisor to general manager Steve Yzerman. In that capacity, he was based out of Minnesota where he often was at the Wild's arena scouting for the Lightning.

The Lightning announced it had re-signed forward J. T. Miller to a five-year, $26.25 million contract extension. The contract carries a cap hit of $5.25 million per season. Miller skated in 19 games with the Lightning last season, scoring 10 goals and 18 points. Miller was acquired in a trade with the New York Rangers during the 2017–18 season prior to the trade deadline.

Later that day, the Hockey Hall of Fame committee announced the members of the 2018 Hall of Fame class, with former Lightning captain Martin St. Louis announced as a first-ballot induction. St. Louis is the Lightning's record holder in assists (588), points (953), power-play points (300), shorthanded goals (28), shorthanded points (44), game-winning goals (64), overtime goals (10), playoff goals (33) and playoff points (68). He also won the Hart Trophy, Art Ross Trophy (two times), Ted Lindsay Award, NHL Plus-Minus Award, Lady Byng Trophy (three times) and the Stanley Cup while a member of the Lightning.

=== July ===
On July 1, 2018, the Lightning announced that it had signed Ryan McDonagh to a 7-year contract extension, which was valued at $47 million. McDonagh had the second highest ice time among Lightning players during the team's trip to the Eastern Conference Final. McDonagh was originally acquired by the Lightning in a trade at the deadline from the New York Rangers.

That same day, the Lightning announced the signing of defenseman Cameron Gaunce to a one-year contract. Guance was originally a draft pick of the Colorado Avalanche in the 2008 draft. Over the course of his career he has appeared in 32 NHL games. Last season he skated in 67 games with the Cleveland Monsters of the American Hockey League.

On July 2, 2018, the Lightning announced the re-signing of defenseman Slater Koekkoek to a one-year contract extension. The contract was valued at $865,000. Koekkoek was originally selected by the Lightning in the 2012 NHL entry draft. Koekkoek had four goals and four assists last season for the Lightning in 35-games.

On July 10, 2018, the Lightning announced the re-signing of forward Nikita Kucherov to an eight-year contract extension. The contract is valued at $76 million with an annual cap hit of $9.5 million. The contract is the richest contract in franchise history. Kucherov led the team last season in points (100), goals (39), and assists (61). Kucherov was an NHL-All star last season and was named a first team all-star.

On July 11, 2018, the Lightning announced the re-signing of forward Adam Erne to a one-year contract extension. The contract is valued at $800,000. Last season Erne skated in 23-games with the Lightning, recording three goals and an assist. Erne missed the last half of the season and all of the playoffs due to a lower-body injury.

On July 12, 2018, the Lightning announced the hiring of assistant coach Derek Lalonde. Lalonde served as the head coach of the Iowa Wild of the American Hockey League. Lalonde had previously worked with Lightning head coach Jon Cooper while he was the head coach of the Green Bay Gamblers of the United States Hockey League.

=== September ===
On September 11, 2018, Steve Yzerman unexpectedly announced that he was resigning as General Manager after eight seasons, however, he was remaining with the team in an advisory role for the final year of his contract. Assistant General Manager Julien BriseBois replaced Yzerman as general manager. BriseBois had served as assistant general manager since 2010. In that capacity BriseBois also served as general manager of the Norfolk Admirals while they were the Lightning's American Hockey League affiliate, and its current affiliate the Syracuse Crunch.

== Training camp ==
=== September ===
On September 14, 2018, the Lightning placed defenseman Jake Dotchin on unconditional waivers with the purpose of terminating his contract. The team said it was due to a material breach of contract. It is believed that the team was unhappy with Dotchin's conditioning at the start of training camp. Dotchin's agent declined to comment, and said they would look to the CBA for any potential remedy.

On September 15, 2018, Jake Dotchin cleared waivers. With no team claiming Dotchin, the Lightning can move forward in the process in terminating his contract.

On September 19, 2018, reports began to surface concerning Jake Dotchin. Elliotte Friedman of Sportsnet reported that Dotchin showed up to camp with his body fat up to as high as 25 percent. Hockey Insider Bob McKenzie of TSN reported the BMI of Dotchin was unconfirmed, but that it was being reported that he showed up to training camp 30 pounds over his playing weight last season. Additionally, McKenzie reported that the National Hockey League Players' Association had become involved in the process. The dispute is set to be heard before an impartial arbitrator to determine whether the Lightning can terminate Dotchin's contract.

That same day the Lightning announced its first round of training camp cuts. All five of the Lightning's training camp invitees were part of the initial cuts. Additionally, the Lightning cut 2018 second-round pick Gabriel Fortier and seventh-round pick Radim Salda. Fortier will re-join the Baie-Comeau Drakkar of the Quebec Major Junior Hockey League. Fortier has played for the Drakkar the past two seasons.

On September 22, 2018, the Lightning claimed forward Danick Martel via waivers from the Philadelphia Flyers. Martel originally joined the Flyers as an undrafted free agent. Martel scored 20+ goals in each of his three seasons in the AHL playing for the Lehigh Valley Phantoms. Last season Martel made his NHL debut with the Flyers, which came over a 4-game stint with the team.

On September 23, 2018, the Lightning made its second round of roster cuts for training camp. The roster cuts brought the Lightning's roster down to 28-players. Of the cuts Gabriel Dumont and Michael Bournival saw limited action with the Lightning last season. Forwards Andy Andreoff, Dumont, Carter Verhaeghe, defenseman Cameron Gaunce, and goaltender Edward Pasquale have to pass through waivers for assignment to the Syracuse Crunch. Prospects Adam Erne, Mathieu Joseph, Alexander Volkov, and Erik Cernak are still with the team.

That same day the team announced that forward Tyler Johnson is considered day-to-day with a lower body injury. Lightning General Manager Julien BriseBois stated that the team was optimistic that Johnson would be ready for the season opener against the Florida Panthers. However, he did concede that it was not a guarantee that Johnson would be ready for that game.

On September 30, 2018, the Lightning announced its third round of roster cuts. Defenseman Eric Cernak and forwards Alexander Volkov and Mitchell Stephens were assigned to the Crunch. The team has not made its official opening night roster announcement. However, it appears that newly acquired forward Danick Martel and 2015 4th round draft pick Mathieu Joseph have made the opening night roster.

=== October ===
On October 3, 2018, the Lightning announced its opening night roster. The forward group consists of Anthony Cirelli, Cory Conacher, Adam Erne, Yanni Gourde, Tyler Johnson, Mathieu Joseph, Alex Killorn, Nikita Kucherov, Danick Martel, J. T. Miller, Ondrej Palat, Cedric Paquette, Brayden Point, and Steven Stamkos. The defensemen are Braydon Coburn, Dan Girardi, Victor Hedman, Slater Koekkoek, Ryan McDonagh, Mikhail Sergachev, and Anton Stralman. Andrei Vasilevskiy and Louis Domingue are the Lightning's goaltending tandem.

== Standings ==
Atlantic Division
Pos	Team	GP	W	L	OTL	ROW	GF	GA	GD	Pts
1	p – Tampa Bay Lightning	82	62	16	4	56	325	222	+103	128
2	x – Boston Bruins	82	49	24	9	47	259	215	+44	107
3	x – Toronto Maple Leafs	82	46	28	8	46	286	251	+35	100
4	Montreal Canadiens	82	44	30	8	41	249	236	+13	96
5	Florida Panthers	82	36	32	14	33	267	280	−13	86
6	Buffalo Sabres	82	33	39	10	28	226	271	−45	76
7	Detroit Red Wings	82	32	40	10	29	227	277	−50	74
8	Ottawa Senators	82	29	47	6	29	242	302	−60	64

Source: National Hockey League
p – Clinched Presidents' Trophy; x – Clinched playoff spot

== Schedule and results ==
=== Preseason ===
2018 preseason game log: 4–3–0 (Home: 1–2–0; Road: 2–1–0; Neutral: 1–0–0)

Game	Date	Opponent	Score	OT	Decision	Location	Attendance	Record	Recap
1	September 18	Carolina Hurricanes	1–4		Vasilevskiy	Amalie Arena	12,454	0–1–0	
2	September 19	@ Carolina Hurricanes	1–6		Pasquale	PNC Arena	6,007	0–2–0	
3	September 21	@ Nashville Predators	5–1		Domingue	Bridgestone Arena	17,342	1–2–0	
4	September 22	Nashville Predators	5–2		Ingram	Amalie Arena	14,457	2–2–0	
5	September 25	Florida Panthers	2–3		Vasilevskiy	Amalie Arena	11,485	2–3–0	
6	September 27	vs. Florida Panthers	6–2		Domingue	Amway Center		3–3–0	
7	September 29	@ Florida Panthers	3–2		Vasilevskiy	BB&T Center	10,487	4–3–0	

Lightning score listed first;

Win Loss Overtime/shootout loss

=== Regular season ===
2018–19 regular season game log
October: 8–2–1, 17 points (Home: 5–1–0; Road: 3–1–1)

Game	Date	Opponent	Score	OT	Decision	Location	Attendance	Record	Points	Recap
1	October 6	Florida Panthers	2–1	SO	Vasilevskiy	Amalie Arena	19,092	1–0–0	2	
2	October 11	Vancouver Canucks	1–4		Vasilevskiy	Amalie Arena	19,092	1–1–0	2	
3	October 13	Columbus Blue Jackets	8–2		Vasilevskiy	Amalie Arena	19,092	2–1–0	4	
4	October 16	Carolina Hurricanes	4–2		Domingue	Amalie Arena	19,092	3–1–0	6	
5	October 18	Detroit Red Wings	3–1		Vasilevskiy	Amalie Arena	19,092	4–1–0	8	
6	October 20	@ Minnesota Wild	4–5	OT	Vasilevskiy	Xcel Energy Center	19,080	4–1–1	9	
7	October 21	@ Chicago Blackhawks	6–3		Domingue	United Center	21,012	5–1–1	11	
8	October 24	@ Colorado Avalanche	1–0		Vasilevskiy	Pepsi Center	16,753	6–1–1	13	
9	October 26	@ Vegas Golden Knights	3–2		Vasilevskiy	T-Mobile Arena	18,207	7–1–1	15	
10	October 27	@ Arizona Coyotes	1–7		Domingue	Gila River Arena	13,623	7–2–1	15	
11	October 30	New Jersey Devils	8–3		Vasilevskiy	Amalie Arena	19,092	8–2–1	17	

November: 10–5–0, 20 points (Home: 6–3–0; Road: 4–2–0)

Game	Date	Opponent	Score	OT	Decision	Location	Attendance	Record	Points	Recap
12	November 1	Nashville Predators	1–4		Vasilevskiy	Amalie Arena	19,092	8–3–1	17	
13	November 3	@ Montreal Canadiens	4–1		Vasilevskiy	Bell Centre	21,302	9–3–1	19	
14	November 4	@ Ottawa Senators	4–3	OT	Domingue	Canadian Tire Centre	11,364	10–3–1	21	
15	November 6	Edmonton Oilers	5–2		Vasilevskiy	Amalie Arena	19,092	11–3–1	23	
16	November 8	New York Islanders	4–2		Vasilevskiy	Amalie Arena	19,092	12–3–1	25	
17	November 10	Ottawa Senators	4–6		Vasilevskiy	Amalie Arena	19,092	12–4–1	25	
18	November 13	@ Buffalo Sabres	1–2		Domingue	KeyBank Center	15,833	12–5–1	25	
19	November 15	@ Pittsburgh Penguins	4–3		Domingue	PPG Paints Arena	18,422	13–5–1	27	
20	November 17	@ Philadelphia Flyers	6–5	OT	Domingue	Wells Fargo Center	19,060	14–5–1	29	
21	November 19	@ Nashville Predators	2–3		Domingue	Bridgestone Arena	17,419	14–6–1	29	
22	November 21	Florida Panthers	7–3		Domingue	Amalie Arena	19,092	15–6–1	31	
23	November 23	Chicago Blackhawks	4–2		Domingue	Amalie Arena	19,092	16–6–1	33	
24	November 25	New Jersey Devils	5–2		Domingue	Amalie Arena	19,092	17–6–1	35	
25	November 27	Anaheim Ducks	1–3		Domingue	Amalie Arena	19,092	17–7–1	35	
26	November 29	Buffalo Sabres	5–4		Domingue	Amalie Arena	19,092	18–7–1	37	

December: 13–0–1, 27 points (Home: 6–0–0; Road: 7–0–1)

Game	Date	Opponent	Score	OT	Decision	Location	Attendance	Record	Points	Recap
27	December 1	@ Florida Panthers	5–4	OT	Domingue	BB&T Center	12,361	19–7–1	39	
28	December 3	@ New Jersey Devils	5–1		Domingue	Prudential Center	13,394	20–7–1	41	
29	December 4	@ Detroit Red Wings	6–5	SO	Pasquale	Little Caesars Arena	18,477	21–7–1	43	
30	December 6	Boston Bruins	3–2		Domingue	Amalie Arena	19,092	22–7–1	45	
31	December 8	Colorado Avalanche	7–1		Domingue	Amalie Arena	19,092	23–7–1	47	
32	December 10	New York Rangers	6–3		Domingue	Amalie Arena	19,092	24–7–1	49	
33	December 13	Toronto Maple Leafs	4–1		Vasilevskiy	Amalie Arena	19,092	25–7–1	51	
34	December 16	@ Winnipeg Jets	4–5	OT	Vasilevskiy	Bell MTS Place	15,321	25–7–2	52	
35	December 18	@ Vancouver Canucks	5–2		Vasilevskiy	Rogers Arena	17,193	26–7–2	54	
36	December 20	@ Calgary Flames	5–4	SO	Domingue	Scotiabank Saddledome	19,289	27–7–2	56	
37	December 22	@ Edmonton Oilers	6–3		Vasilevskiy	Rogers Place	18,347	28–7–2	58	
38	December 27	Philadelphia Flyers	6–5	OT	Vasilevskiy	Amalie Arena	19,092	29–7–2	60	
39	December 29	Montreal Canadiens	6–5		Vasilevskiy	Amalie Arena	19,092	30–7–2	62	
40	December 31	@ Anaheim Ducks	2–1	OT	Vasilevskiy	Honda Center	17,340	31–7–2	64	

January: 6–4–0, 12 points (Home: 3–1–0; Road: 3–3–0)

Game	Date	Opponent	Score	OT	Decision	Location	Attendance	Record	Points	Recap
41	January 3	@ Los Angeles Kings	6–2		Vasilevskiy	Staples Center	17,551	32–7–2	66	
42	January 5	@ San Jose Sharks	2–5		Vasilevskiy	SAP Center	17,562	32–8–2	66	
43	January 8	Columbus Blue Jackets	4–0		Vasilevskiy	Amalie Arena	19,092	33–8–2	68	
44	January 10	Carolina Hurricanes	3–1		Vasilevskiy	Amalie Arena	19,092	34–8–2	70	
45	January 12	@ Buffalo Sabres	5–3		Domingue	KeyBank Center	19,070	35–8–2	72	
46	January 13	@ New York Islanders	1–5		Vasilevskiy	Barclays Center	11,193	35–9–2	72	
47	January 15	@ Dallas Stars	2–0		Vasilevskiy	American Airlines Center	18,021	36–9–2	74	
48	January 17	Toronto Maple Leafs	2–4		Vasilevskiy	Amalie Arena	19,092	36–10–2	74	
49	January 19	San Jose Sharks	6–3		Vasilevskiy	Amalie Arena	19,092	37–10–2	76	
All-Star Break (January 24–January 27)
50	January 30	@ Pittsburgh Penguins	2–4		Vasilevskiy	PPG Paints Arena	18,514	37–11–2	76	

February: 12–1–2, 26 points (Home: 6–0–2; Road: 6–1–0)

Game	Date	Opponent	Score	OT	Decision	Location	Attendance	Record	Points	Recap
51	February 1	@ New York Islanders	1–0	SO	Vasilevskiy	Nassau Coliseum	13,971	38–11–2	78	
52	February 2	@ New York Rangers	3–2		Domingue	Madison Square Garden	17,468	39–11–2	80	
53	February 5	Vegas Golden Knights	2–3	SO	Vasilevskiy	Amalie Arena	19,092	39–11–3	81	
54	February 7	St. Louis Blues	0–1	OT	Vasilevskiy	Amalie Arena	19,092	39–11–4	82	
55	February 9	Pittsburgh Penguins	5–4		Vasilevskiy	Amalie Arena	19,092	40–11–4	84	
56	February 10	@ Florida Panthers	5–2		Domingue	BB&T Center	13,566	41–11–4	86	
57	February 12	Calgary Flames	6–3		Vasilevskiy	Amalie Arena	19,092	42–11–4	88	
58	February 14	Dallas Stars	6–0		Vasilevskiy	Amalie Arena	19,092	43–11–4	90	
59	February 16	Montreal Canadiens	3–0		Vasilevskiy	Amalie Arena	19,092	44–11–4	92	
60	February 18	@ Columbus Blue Jackets	5–1		Vasilevskiy	Nationwide Arena	16,411	45–11–4	94	
61	February 19	@ Philadelphia Flyers	5–2		Domingue	Wells Fargo Center	18,932	46–11–4	96	
62	February 21	Buffalo Sabres	2–1	SO	Vasilevskiy	Amalie Arena	19,092	47–11–4	98	
63	February 25	Los Angeles Kings	4–3	SO	Vasilevskiy	Amalie Arena	19,092	48–11–4	100	
64	February 27	@ New York Rangers	4–3	OT	Vasilevskiy	Madison Square Garden	17,012	49–11–4	102	
65	February 28	@ Boston Bruins	1–4		Domingue	TD Garden	17,565	49–12–4	102	

March: 10–3–0, 20 points (Home: 6–2–0; Road: 4–1–0)

Game	Date	Opponent	Score	OT	Decision	Location	Attendance	Record	Points	Recap
66	March 2	Ottawa Senators	5–1		Vasilevskiy	Amalie Arena	19,092	50–12–4	104	
67	March 5	Winnipeg Jets	5–2		Vasilevskiy	Amalie Arena	19,092	51–12–4	106	
68	March 7	Minnesota Wild	0–3		Vasilevskiy	Amalie Arena	19,092	51–13–4	106	
69	March 9	Detroit Red Wings	3–2		Domingue	Amalie Arena	19,092	52–13–4	108	
70	March 11	@ Toronto Maple Leafs	6–2		Vasilevskiy	Scotiabank Arena	19,491	53–13–4	110	
71	March 14	@ Detroit Red Wings	5–4		Vasilevskiy	Little Caesars Arena	19,515	54–13–4	112	
72	March 16	Washington Capitals	6–3		Vasilevskiy	Amalie Arena	19,092	55–13–4	114	
73	March 18	Arizona Coyotes	4–1		Vasilevskiy	Amalie Arena	19,092	56–13–4	116	
74	March 20	@ Washington Capitals	5–4	OT	Vasilevskiy	Capital One Arena	18,506	57–13–4	118	
75	March 21	@ Carolina Hurricanes	6–3		Domingue	PNC Arena	13,785	58–13–4	120	
76	March 23	@ St. Louis Blues	3–4		Vasilevskiy	Enterprise Center	18,127	58–14–4	120	
77	March 25	Boston Bruins	5–4		Vasilevskiy	Amalie Arena	19,092	59–14–4	122	
78	March 30	Washington Capitals	3–6		Vasilevskiy	Amalie Arena	19,092	59–15–4	122	

April: 3–1–0, 6 points (Home: 0–0–0; Road: 3–1–0)

Game	Date	Opponent	Score	OT	Decision	Location	Attendance	Record	Points	Recap
79	April 1	@ Ottawa Senators	5–2		Vasilevskiy	Canadian Tire Centre	13,628	60–15–4	124	
80	April 2	@ Montreal Canadiens	2–4		Pasquale	Bell Centre	21,302	60–16–4	124	
81	April 4	@ Toronto Maple Leafs	3–1		Vasilevskiy	Scotiabank Arena	19,400	61–16–4	126	
82	April 6	@ Boston Bruins	6–3		Pasquale	TD Garden	17,565	62–16–4	128	

Lightning score listed first;

Win (2 points) Loss (0 points) Overtime/shootout loss (1 point)

=== Playoffs ===
2019 Stanley Cup playoffs
Eastern Conference First Round vs. Columbus Blue Jackets (WC2) – Columbus wins series 4–0

Game	Date	Opponent	Score	OT	Decision	Location	Attendance	Series	Recap
1	April 10	Columbus Blue Jackets	3–4		Vasilevskiy	Amalie Arena	19,092	0–1	
2	April 12	Columbus Blue Jackets	1–5		Vasilevskiy	Amalie Arena	19,092	0–2	
3	April 14	@ Columbus Blue Jackets	1–3		Vasilevskiy	Nationwide Arena	19,224	0–3	
4	April 16	@ Columbus Blue Jackets	3–7		Vasilevskiy	Nationwide Arena	19,328	0–4	

Lightning score listed first;

Win Loss If necessary

== Player stats ==
Final

=== Skaters ===
Regular season
Player	GP	G	A	Pts	+/−	PIM
Nikita Kucherov	82	41	87	128	24	62
Steven Stamkos	82	45	53	98	4	37
Brayden Point	79	41	51	92	27	28
Victor Hedman	70	12	42	54	24	44
Yanni Gourde	80	22	26	48	8	66
Tyler Johnson	80	29	18	47	15	28
J. T. Miller	75	13	34	47	8	30
Ryan McDonagh	82	9	37	46	38	37
Alex Killorn	82	18	22	40	22	45
Anthony Cirelli	82	19	20	39	24	34
Ondrej Palat	64	8	26	34	4	20
Mikhail Sergachev	75	6	26	32	12	28
Mathieu Joseph	70	13	13	26	5	26
Braydon Coburn	74	4	19	23	3	34
Adam Erne	65	7	13	20	10	40
Cedric Paquette	80	13	4	17	7	80
Ryan Callahan	52	7	10	17	7	14
Anton Stralman	47	2	15	17	12	8
Erik Cernak	58	5	11	16	25	58
Dan Girardi	62	4	12	16	5	12
Jan Rutta^{†}	14	0	2	2	4	4
Danick Martel	9	0	2	2	3	8
Slater Koekkoek^{‡}	9	1	0	1	0	4
Cameron Gaunce	2	0	0	0	3	7
Cory Conacher	1	0	0	0	0	2

Playoffs
Player	GP	G	A	Pts	+/−	PIM
Erik Cernak	4	0	3	3	−2	0
Steven Stamkos	4	1	1	2	−8	2
Anthony Cirelli	4	1	1	2	−1	0
Mikhail Sergachev	4	1	1	2	−4	0
J. T. Miller	4	0	2	2	0	0
Jan Rutta	4	0	2	2	2	0
Nikita Kucherov	3	0	2	2	−4	19
Alex Killorn	4	1	0	1	2	6
Ondrej Palat	4	1	0	1	−2	2
Yanni Gourde	4	1	0	1	−3	0
Cedric Paquette	4	1	0	1	−1	0
Brayden Point	4	1	0	1	−5	5
Tyler Johnson	4	0	1	1	−3	0
Braydon Coburn	2	0	1	1	2	0
Dan Girardi	4	0	0	0	−2	4
Ryan McDonagh	4	0	0	0	−6	2
Mathieu Joseph	4	0	0	0	−2	0
Adam Erne	3	0	0	0	0	2
Ryan Callahan	2	0	0	0	0	4
Victor Hedman	2	0	0	0	−2	10

=== Goaltenders ===
Regular season
Player	GP	GS	TOI	W	L	OT	GA	GAA	SA	SV%	SO	G	A	PIM
Andrei Vasilevskiy	53	53	3204	39	10	4	128	2.40	1713	.925	6	0	3	6
Louis Domingue	26	26	1561	21	5	0	75	2.88	812	.908	0	0	1	4
Edward Pasquale	3	3	182	2	1	0	12	3.96	102	.909	0	0	0	0

Playoffs
Player	GP	GS	TOI	W	L	GA	GAA	SA	SV%	SO	G	A	PIM
Andrei Vasilevskiy	4	4	236	0	4	15	3.83	104	.856	0	0	0	0

^{†}Denotes player spent time with another team before joining Tampa Bay. Stats reflect time with Tampa Bay only.
^{‡}Traded from Tampa Bay mid-season.
Bold/italics denotes franchise record

== Suspensions/fines ==
Player	Explanation	Length	Salary	Date issued
Mikhail Sergachev	Fined for cross-checking Johan Larsson during the game against the Buffalo Sabres on January 12, 2019, at KeyBank Center.	—	$2,403.67	January 13, 2019
Nikita Kucherov	Fined for a dangerous trip on Scott Mayfield during the game against the New York Islanders on February 2, 2019, at Nassau Coliseum.	—	$5,000	February 3, 2019
Yanni Gourde	Suspended for two games for an illegal check to the head of Carolina Hurricanes' forward Jordan Staal on March 21, 2019, at PNC Arena.	2 games	$10,752.68	March 22, 2019
Nikita Kucherov	Suspended for one game for boarding Columbus Blue Jackets' defenseman Markus Nutivaara on April 12, 2019, at Nationwide Arena.	1 game	—	April 13, 2019

== Awards and honours ==
=== Awards ===
Regular season
Player	Award	Awarded
Brayden Point	NHL Third Star of the Week	November 5, 2018
Nikita Kucherov	NHL Third Star of the Week	November 26, 2018
Louis Domingue	NHL Second Star of the Week	December 10, 2018
Nikita Kucherov	NHL Third Star of the Week	December 24, 2018
Nikita Kucherov	NHL First Star of December	January 2, 2019
Steven Stamkos	NHL All-Star Game selection	January 2, 2019
Nikita Kucherov	NHL All-Star Game selection	January 2, 2019
Jon Cooper	NHL All-Star Game selection	January 5, 2019
Andrei Vasilevskiy	NHL All-Star Game selection	January 8, 2019
Nikita Kucherov	NHL First Star of the Week	February 18, 2019
Nikita Kucherov	NHL First Star of February	March 1, 2019
Steven Stamkos	NHL Second Star of the Week	March 25, 2019
Nikita Kucherov	Art Ross Trophy	April 7, 2019
Nikita Kucherov	Ted Lindsay Award	June 19, 2019
Nikita Kucherov	Hart Memorial Trophy	June 19, 2019
Andrei Vasilevskiy	Vezina Trophy	June 19, 2019
Nikita Kucherov	First team All-Star	June 19, 2019
Andrei Vasilevskiy	First team All-Star	June 19, 2019
Victor Hedman	Second team All-Star	June 19, 2019
Anthony Cirelli	NHL All-Rookie Team	June 19, 2019

=== Milestones ===
Regular season
Player	Milestone	Reached
Mathieu Joseph	1st career NHL game	October 7, 2018
Mathieu Joseph	1st career NHL assist 1st career NHL point	October 16, 2018
J. T. Miller	200th career NHL point	October 30, 2018
Tyler Johnson	400th career NHL game	November 1, 2018
Louis Domingue	100th career NHL game	November 4, 2018
Mathieu Joseph	1st career NHL goal	November 4, 2018
Mikhail Sergachev	100th career NHL game	November 10, 2018
Erik Cernak	1st career NHL game	November 13, 2018
Nikita Kucherov	200th career NHL assist	November 15, 2018
Brayden Point	1st career NHL hat trick	November 15, 2018
Erik Cernak	1st career NHL assist 1st career NHL point	November 19, 2018
Ryan McDonagh	200th career NHL assist	November 19, 2018
Dan Girardi	200th career NHL assist	November 25, 2018
Edward Pasquale	1st career NHL game 1st Career NHL win	December 4, 2018
Steven Stamkos	700th career NHL point	December 10, 2018
Dan Girardi	900th career NHL game	December 18, 2018
Nikita Kucherov	400th career NHL game	December 18, 2018
Danick Martel	1st career NHL assist 1st career NHL point	December 18, 2018
Steven Stamkos	700th career NHL game	December 20, 2018
Yanni Gourde	100th career NHL point	December 29, 2018
Victor Hedman	300th career NHL assist	December 29, 2018
Andrei Vasilevskiy	100th career NHL win	December 31, 2018
Nikita Kucherov	400th career NHL point	January 3, 2019
J. T. Miller	400th career NHL game	January 13, 2019
Brayden Point	200th career NHL game	January 30, 2019
Erik Cernak	1st career NHL goal	February 3, 2019
Ondrej Palat	400th career NHL game	February 5, 2019
Braydon Coburn	900th career NHL game	February 9, 2019
Victor Hedman	400th career NHL point	February 9, 2019
Alex Killorn	100th career NHL goal	February 19, 2019
Tyler Johnson	300th career NHL point	February 27, 2019
Brayden Point	100th career NHL assist	February 27, 2019
Alex Killorn	500th career NHL game	February 28, 2019
Adam Erne	100th career NHL game	March 1, 2019
Ryan McDonagh	600th career NHL game	March 11, 2019
Andrei Vasilevskiy	200th career NHL game	March 14, 2019
Alex Killorn	1st career NHL hat trick	March 16, 2019
Ryan Callahan	200th career NHL assist	March 25, 2019
Anthony Cirelli	100th career NHL game	April 6, 2019

Playoffs
Player	Milestone	Reached
Erik Cernak	1st career playoff game 1st career playoff point 1st career playoff assist	April 10, 2019
Adam Erne	1st career playoff game	April 10, 2019
Mathieu Joseph	1st career playoff game	April 10, 2019
Jan Rutta	1st career playoff game 1st career playoff point 1st career playoff assist	April 10, 2019

== Transactions ==
The Lightning have been involved in the following transactions during the 2018–19 season.

=== Trades ===
Date	Details		Ref
October 18, 2018	To Anaheim Ducks Future considerations	To Tampa Bay Lightning Mitch Hults	
January 11, 2019	To Chicago Blackhawks Slater Koekkoek; 5th-round pick in 2019	To Tampa Bay Lightning Jan Rutta; 7th-round pick in 2019	
June 14, 2019	To Nashville Predators Connor Ingram	To Tampa Bay Lightning 7th-round pick in 2021	

=== Free agents ===
Date	Player	Team	Contract term	Ref
July 1, 2018	Erik Condra	to Dallas Stars	1-year	
July 1, 2018	Alex Gallant	to Vegas Golden Knights	1-year	
July 1, 2018	Cameron Gaunce	from Columbus Blue Jackets	1-year	
July 1, 2018	Chris Kunitz	to Chicago Blackhawks	1-year	
July 1, 2018	Kevin Lynch	from Syracuse Crunch (AHL)	1-year	
July 1, 2018	Matthew Peca	to Montreal Canadiens	2-year	
July 5, 2018	Andrej Sustr	to Anaheim Ducks	1-year	
July 19, 2018	Mat Bodie	to Torpedo Nizhny Novgorod (KHL)	1-year	
March 1, 2019	Jimmy Huntington	from Rimouski Océanic (QMJHL)	3-year	
June 14, 2019	Edward Pasquale	to Barys Astana (KHL)	1-year	

=== Waivers ===
Date	Player	Team	Ref
September 22, 2018	Danick Martel	from Philadelphia Flyers	

=== Contract terminations ===
Date	Player	Via	Ref
September 15, 2018	Jake Dotchin	Termination	
May 25, 2019	Jonne Tammela	Mutual termination	

=== Retirement ===
Date	Player	Ref

=== Signings ===
Date	Player	Contract term	Ref
June 22, 2018	Louis Domingue	2-year	
June 26, 2018	Ross Colton	2-year	
June 26, 2018	J. T. Miller	5-year	
July 1, 2018	Ryan McDonagh	7-year	
July 2, 2018	Slater Koekkoek	1-year	
July 5, 2018	Cedric Paquette	1-year	
July 10, 2018	Nikita Kucherov	8-year	
July 11, 2018	Adam Erne	1-year	
October 17, 2018	Cory Conacher	1-year	
November 2, 2018	Yanni Gourde	6-year	
December 19, 2018	Gabriel Fortier	3-year	
March 22, 2019	Ryan Lohin	2-year	
May 3, 2019	Jan Rutta	1-year	
June 14, 2019	Cameron Gaunce	1-year	
June 18, 2019	Braydon Coburn	2-year	
June 19, 2019	Daniel Walcott	1-year	

== Draft picks ==
Below are the Tampa Bay Lightning's selections at the 2018 NHL entry draft, which was held on June 22 and 23, 2018, at the American Airlines Center in Dallas, Texas.

Round	#	Player	Pos	Nationality	College/Junior/Club team (League)
2	59	Gabriel Fortier	LW	Canada	Baie-Comeau Drakkar (QMJHL)
3	90	Dmitry Semykin	D	Russia	Kapitan Stupino (MHL)
4	121	Alexander Green	D	United States	Cornell University (ECAC)
5	152	Magnus Chrona	G	Sweden	Nacka HK (J18 Elit)
6	183	Cole Koepke	LW	United States	Sioux City Musketeers (USHL)
7	206^{1}	Radim Salda	D	Czech Republic	Saint John Sea Dogs (QMJHL)
7	214	Ty Taylor	G	Canada	Vernon Vipers (BCHL)

Notes:

1. The Los Angeles Kings' seventh-round pick went to the Tampa Bay Lightning as the result of a trade on May 31, 2017, that sent Bokondji Imama to Los Angeles in exchange for this pick (being conditional at the time of the trade).
