= 2018–19 Boston Bruins season =

NHL team season

2018–19 Boston Bruins
- Eastern Conference champions
- Division: 2nd Atlantic
- Conference: 2nd Eastern
- 2018–19 record: 49–24–9
- Home record: 29–9–3
- Road record: 20–15–6
- Goals for: 259
- Goals against: 215

Team information
- General manager: Don Sweeney
- Coach: Bruce Cassidy
- Captain: Zdeno Chara
- Alternate captains: Patrice Bergeron; David Krejci
- Arena: TD Garden
- Average attendance: 17,565
- Minor league affiliates: Providence Bruins (AHL); Atlanta Gladiators (ECHL)

Team leaders
- Goals: David Pastrnak (38)
- Assists: Brad Marchand (64)
- Points: Brad Marchand (100)
- Penalty minutes: Brad Marchand (96)
- Plus/minus: Patrice Bergeron (+23)
- Wins: Tuukka Rask (27)
- Goals against average: Jaroslav Halak (2.34)

The 2018–19 Boston Bruins season was the 95th season for the National Hockey League (NHL) franchise that was established on November 1, 1924. The Bruins clinched a playoff spot on March 23, 2019, after a 7–3 win over the Florida Panthers.

On May 16, 2019, the Bruins advanced to the 2019 Stanley Cup Final with a 4–0 sweep over the Carolina Hurricanes, marking their first Stanley Cup Final appearance since 2013. They would lose in seven games to the St. Louis Blues, one win short from winning the Stanley Cup.

== Standings ==
Atlantic Division
Pos	Team	GP	W	L	OTL	ROW	GF	GA	GD	Pts
1	p – Tampa Bay Lightning	82	62	16	4	56	325	222	+103	128
2	x – Boston Bruins	82	49	24	9	47	259	215	+44	107
3	x – Toronto Maple Leafs	82	46	28	8	46	286	251	+35	100
4	Montreal Canadiens	82	44	30	8	41	249	236	+13	96
5	Florida Panthers	82	36	32	14	33	267	280	−13	86
6	Buffalo Sabres	82	33	39	10	28	226	271	−45	76
7	Detroit Red Wings	82	32	40	10	29	227	277	−50	74
8	Ottawa Senators	82	29	47	6	29	242	302	−60	64

Source: National Hockey League
p – Clinched Presidents' Trophy; x – Clinched playoff spot

== Schedule and results ==
=== Preseason ===
The preseason schedule was published on May 18, 2018.

2018 preseason game log: 5–1–2 (Home: 2–1–1; Road: 3–0–1)
#	Date	Visitor	Score	Home	OT	Decision	Attendance	Record	Recap
1^{[a]}	September 15	Boston	4–3	Calgary	SO	Halak	—	1–0–0	Recap
2	September 16	Washington	1–2	Boston	SO	McIntyre	17,565	2–0–0	Recap
3	September 18	Boston	5–2	Washington		Vladar	14,952	3–0–0	Recap
4^{[b]}	September 19	Calgary	1–3	Boston		Rask	—	4–0–0	Recap
5	September 22	Boston	3–4	Detroit	OT	McIntyre	16,855	4–0–1	Recap
6	September 24	Boston	4–3	Philadelphia		Vladar	18,955	5–0–1	Recap
7	September 26	Detroit	3–2	Boston	OT	Halak	17,565	5–0–2	Recap
8	September 29	Philadelphia	4–1	Boston		Rask	17,565	5–1–2	Recap
Notes:^{a} Game was played at Shenzhen Universiade Sports Centre in Shenzhen, China.^{b} Game was played at Cadillac Arena in Beijing, China.

=== Regular season ===
The regular season schedule was released on June 21, 2018.

2018–19 game log

October: 7–3–2 (Home: 4–1–0; Road: 3–2–2)
#	Date	Visitor	Score	Home	OT	Decision	Attendance	Record	Pts	Recap
1	October 3	Boston	0–7	Washington		Rask	18,506	0–1–0	0	Recap
2	October 4	Boston	4–0	Buffalo		Halak	19,070	1–1–0	2	Recap
3	October 8	Ottawa	3–6	Boston		Rask	17,565	2–1–0	4	Recap
4	October 11	Edmonton	1–4	Boston		Halak	17,565	3–1–0	6	Recap
5	October 13	Detroit	2–8	Boston		Rask	17,565	4–1–0	8	Recap
6	October 17	Boston	2–5	Calgary		Rask	17,641	4–2–0	8	Recap
7	October 18	Boston	2–3	Edmonton	OT	Halak	18,347	4–2–1	9	Recap
8	October 20	Boston	1–2	Vancouver	OT	Halak	17,871	4–2–2	10	Recap
9	October 23	Boston	4–1	Ottawa		Rask	15,265	5–2–2	12	Recap
10	October 25	Philadelphia	0–3	Boston		Halak	17,565	6–2–2	14	Recap
11	October 27	Montreal	3–0	Boston		Rask	17,565	6–3–2	14	Recap
12	October 30	Boston	3–2	Carolina		Halak	11,357	7–3–2	16	Recap

November: 7–4–2 (Home: 5–1–0; Road: 2–3–2)
#	Date	Visitor	Score	Home	OT	Decision	Attendance	Record	Pts	Recap
13	November 3	Boston	0–1	Nashville		Halak	17,535	7–4–2	16	Recap
14	November 5	Dallas	1–2	Boston	OT	Rask	17,565	8–4–2	18	Recap
15	November 8	Vancouver	8–5	Boston		Rask	17,565	8–5–2	18	Recap
16	November 10	Toronto	1–5	Boston		Halak	17,565	9–5–2	20	Recap
17	November 11	Vegas	1–4	Boston		Halak	17,565	10–5–2	22	Recap
18	November 14	Boston	3–6	Colorado		Halak	16,124	10–6–2	22	Recap
19	November 16	Boston	0–1	Dallas	OT	Rask	18,532	10–6–3	23	Recap
20	November 17	Boston	2–1	Arizona		Halak	16,386	11–6–3	25	Recap
21	November 21	Boston	2–3	Detroit	OT	Rask	19,515	11–6–4	26	Recap
22	November 23	Pittsburgh	1–2	Boston	OT	Halak	17,565	12–6–4	28	Recap
23	November 24	Boston	3–2	Montreal		Rask	21,302	13–6–4	30	Recap
24	November 26	Boston	2–4	Toronto		Halak	19,286	13–7–4	30	Recap
25	November 29	NY Islanders	1–2	Boston	SO	Rask	17,565	14–7–4	32	Recap

December: 7–7–0 (Home: 4–3–0; Road: 3–4–0)
#	Date	Visitor	Score	Home	OT	Decision	Attendance	Record	Pts	Recap
26	December 1	Detroit	4–2	Boston		Rask	17,565	14–8–4	32	Recap
27	December 4	Boston	0–5	Florida		Halak	12,058	14–9–4	32	Recap
28	December 6	Boston	2–3	Tampa Bay		Rask	19,092	14–10–4	32	Recap
29	December 8	Toronto	3–6	Boston		Halak	17,565	15–10–4	34	Recap
30	December 9	Boston	2–1	Ottawa	OT	Rask	13,148	16–10–4	36	Recap
31	December 11	Arizona	3–4	Boston		Rask	17,565	17–10–4	38	Recap
32	December 14	Boston	3–5	Pittsburgh		Halak	18,549	17–11–4	38	Recap
33	December 16	Buffalo	4–2	Boston		Rask	17,565	17–12–4	38	Recap
34	December 17	Boston	4–0	Montreal		Halak	21,302	18–12–4	40	Recap
35	December 20	Anaheim	1–3	Boston		Halak	17,565	19–12–4	42	Recap
36	December 22	Nashville	2–5	Boston		Halak	17,565	20–12–4	44	Recap
37	December 23	Boston	3–5	Carolina		Rask	17,409	20–13–4	44	Recap
38	December 27	New Jersey	5–2	Boston		Halak	17,565	20–14–4	44	Recap
39	December 29	Boston	3–2	Buffalo	OT	Rask	19,070	21–14–4	46	Recap

January: 6–3–3 (Home: 4–2–3; Road: 2–1–0)
#	Date	Visitor	Score	Home	OT	Decision	Attendance	Record	Pts	Recap
40	January 1	Boston	4–2	Chicago		Rask	76,126 (outdoors)	22–14–4	48	Recap
41	January 3	Calgary	4–6	Boston		Halak	17,565	23–14–4	50	Recap
42	January 5	Buffalo	1–2	Boston		Rask	17,565	24–14–4	52	Recap
43	January 8	Minnesota	0–4	Boston		Rask	17,565	25–14–4	54	Recap
44	January 10	Washington	4–2	Boston		Halak	17,565	25–15–4	54	Recap
45	January 12	Boston	3–2	Toronto		Rask	19,305	26–15–4	56	Recap
46	January 14	Montreal	3–2	Boston	OT	Rask	17,565	26–15–5	57	Recap
47	January 16	Boston	3–4	Philadelphia		Halak	19,297	26–16–5	57	Recap
48	January 17	St. Louis	2–5	Boston		Rask	17,565	27–16–5	59	Recap
49	January 19	NY Rangers	3–2	Boston		Halak	17,565	27–17–5	59	Recap
50	January 29	Winnipeg	4–3	Boston	SO	Halak	17,565	27–17–6	60	Recap
51	January 31	Philadelphia	3–2	Boston	OT	Rask	17,565	27–17–7	61	Recap

February: 11–0–2 (Home: 6–0–0; Road: 5–0–2)
#	Date	Visitor	Score	Home	OT	Decision	Attendance	Record	Pts	Recap
52	February 3	Boston	1–0	Washington		Rask	18,506	28–17–7	63	Recap
53	February 5	NY Islanders	1–3	Boston		Rask	17,565	29–17–7	65	Recap
54	February 6	Boston	3–4	NY Rangers	SO	Halak	16,848	29–17–8	66	Recap
55	February 9	Los Angeles	4–5	Boston	OT	Rask	17,565	30–17–8	68	Recap
56	February 10	Colorado	1–2	Boston	OT	Halak	17,565	31–17–8	70	Recap
57	February 12	Chicago	3–6	Boston		Rask	17,565	32–17–8	72	Recap
58	February 15	Boston	3–0	Anaheim		Halak	17,174	33–17–8	74	Recap
59	February 16	Boston	4–2	Los Angeles		Rask	18,230	34–17–8	76	Recap
60	February 18	Boston	6–5	San Jose	OT	Rask	17,562	35–17–8	78	Recap
61	February 20	Boston	3–2	Vegas	SO	Halak	18,222	36–17–8	80	Recap
62	February 23	Boston	1–2	St. Louis	SO	Rask	18,425	36–17–9	81	Recap
63	February 26	San Jose	1–4	Boston		Halak	17,565	37–17–9	83	Recap
64	February 28	Tampa Bay	1–4	Boston		Rask	17,565	38–17–9	85	Recap

March: 9–6–0 (Home: 6–1–0; Road: 3–5–0)
#	Date	Visitor	Score	Home	OT	Decision	Attendance	Record	Pts	Recap
65	March 2	New Jersey	0–1	Boston		Rask	17,565	39–17–9	87	Recap
66	March 5	Carolina	3–4	Boston	OT	Halak	17,565	40–17–9	89	Recap
67	March 7	Florida	3–4	Boston		Rask	17,565	41–17–9	91	Recap
68	March 9	Ottawa	2–3	Boston		Rask	17,565	42–17–9	93	Recap
69	March 10	Boston	2–4	Pittsburgh		Halak	18,578	42–18–9	93	Recap
70	March 12	Boston	4–7	Columbus		Rask	16,554	42–19–9	93	Recap
71	March 14	Boston	3–4	Winnipeg		Rask	15,321	42–20–9	93	Recap
72	March 16	Columbus	1–2	Boston	OT	Halak	17,565	43–20–9	95	Recap
73	March 19	Boston	5–0	NY Islanders		Rask	13,917	44–20–9	97	Recap
74	March 21	Boston	5–1	New Jersey		Rask	14,649	45–20–9	99	Recap
75	March 23	Boston	7–3	Florida		Halak	17,129	46–20–9	101	Recap
76	March 25	Boston	4–5	Tampa Bay		Rask	19,092	46–21–9	101	Recap
77	March 27	NY Rangers	3–6	Boston		Halak	17,565	47–21–9	103	Recap
78	March 30	Florida	4–1	Boston		Rask	17,565	47–22–9	103	Recap
79	March 31	Boston	3–6	Detroit		Halak	19,515	47–23–9	103	Recap

April: 2–1–0 (Home: 0–1–0; Road: 2–0–0)
#	Date	Visitor	Score	Home	OT	Decision	Attendance	Record	Pts	Recap
80	April 2	Boston	6–2	Columbus		Rask	18,890	48–23–9	105	Recap
81	April 4	Boston	3–0	Minnesota		Halak	19,074	49–23–9	107	Recap
82	April 6	Tampa Bay	6–3	Boston		Rask	17,565	49–24–9	107	Recap

Legend: Win (2 points) Loss (0 points) Overtime/shootout loss (1 point)

=== Playoffs ===
The Bruins faced the Toronto Maple Leafs in the First Round of the playoffs, and defeated them in seven games. They played against each other in the 2018 Stanley Cup playoffs, where the Bruins defeated the Maple Leafs in the First Round in seven games.

The Bruins faced the Columbus Blue Jackets in the Second Round of the playoffs, defeating them in six games.

The Bruins faced the Carolina Hurricanes in the Conference Finals, and swept the series in four games. They played against each other in the 2009 Stanley Cup playoffs, where the Bruins lost to the Hurricanes in the Conference Semifinals in seven games.

The Bruins faced the St. Louis Blues in the Stanley Cup Final, where the Bruins lost to the Blues in seven games. This marked the first time since 1990 that they had home ice advantage in the final round.

2019 Stanley Cup playoffs

Eastern Conference First Round vs. (A3) Toronto Maple Leafs: Boston won 4–3
#	Date	Visitor	Score	Home	OT	Decision	Attendance	Series	Recap
1	April 11	Toronto	4–1	Boston		Rask	17,565	0–1	Recap
2	April 13	Toronto	1–4	Boston		Rask	17,565	1–1	Recap
3	April 15	Boston	2–3	Toronto		Rask	19,611	1–2	Recap
4	April 17	Boston	6–4	Toronto		Rask	19,638	2–2	Recap
5	April 19	Toronto	2–1	Boston		Rask	17,565	2–3	Recap
6	April 21	Boston	4–2	Toronto		Rask	19,683	3–3	Recap
7	April 23	Toronto	1–5	Boston		Rask	17,565	4–3	Recap

Eastern Conference Second Round vs. (WC2) Columbus Blue Jackets: Boston won 4–2
#	Date	Visitor	Score	Home	OT	Decision	Attendance	Series	Recap
1	April 25	Columbus	2–3	Boston	OT	Rask	17,565	1–0	Recap
2	April 27	Columbus	3–2	Boston	2OT	Rask	17,565	1–1	Recap
3	April 30	Boston	1–2	Columbus		Rask	19,337	1–2	Recap
4	May 2	Boston	4–1	Columbus		Rask	19,431	2–2	Recap
5	May 4	Columbus	3–4	Boston		Rask	17,565	3–2	Recap
6	May 6	Boston	3–0	Columbus		Rask	19,219	4–2	Recap

Eastern Conference Finals vs. (WC1) Carolina Hurricanes: Boston won 4–0
#	Date	Visitor	Score	Home	OT	Decision	Attendance	Series	Recap
1	May 9	Carolina	2–5	Boston		Rask	17,565	1–0	Recap
2	May 12	Carolina	2–6	Boston		Rask	17,565	2–0	Recap
3	May 14	Boston	2–1	Carolina		Rask	18,768	3–0	Recap
4	May 16	Boston	4–0	Carolina		Rask	19,041	4–0	Recap

Stanley Cup Final vs. (C3) St. Louis Blues: St. Louis won 4–3
#	Date	Visitor	Score	Home	OT	Decision	Attendance	Series	Recap
1	May 27	St. Louis	2–4	Boston		Rask	17,565	1–0	Recap
2	May 29	St. Louis	3–2	Boston	OT	Rask	17,565	1–1	Recap
3	June 1	Boston	7–2	St. Louis		Rask	18,789	2–1	Recap
4	June 3	Boston	2–4	St. Louis		Rask	18,805	2–2	Recap
5	June 6	St. Louis	2–1	Boston		Rask	17,565	2–3	Recap
6	June 9	Boston	5–1	St. Louis		Rask	18,890	3–3	Recap
7	June 12	St. Louis	4–1	Boston		Rask	17,565	3–4	Recap

Legend: Win Loss

== Player statistics ==
As of June 12, 2019

=== Skaters ===
Regular season
Player	GP	G	A	Pts	+/−	PIM
Brad Marchand	79	36	64	100	15	96
David Pastrnak	66	38	43	81	6	32
Patrice Bergeron	65	32	47	79	23	30
David Krejci	81	20	53	73	7	16
Torey Krug	64	6	47	53	–2	33
Jake DeBrusk	68	27	15	42	2	18
Danton Heinen	77	11	23	34	13	16
Charlie McAvoy	54	7	21	28	14	45
Sean Kuraly	71	8	13	21	6	38
David Backes	70	7	13	20	0	31
Chris Wagner	76	12	7	19	3	51
Matt Grzelcyk	66	3	15	18	9	68
Noel Acciari	72	6	8	14	–3	47
Zdeno Chara	62	5	9	14	22	57
John Moore	61	4	9	13	0	26
Joakim Nordstrom	70	7	5	12	0	13
Brandon Carlo	72	2	8	10	22	47
Ryan Donato^{‡}	34	6	3	9	–11	2
Jakob Forsbacka Karlsson	28	3	6	9	1	2
Kevan Miller	39	0	7	7	8	35
Peter Cehlarik	20	4	2	6	3	6
Steven Kampfer	35	3	3	6	–6	22
Charlie Coyle^{†}	21	2	4	6	–2	4
Karson Kuhlman	11	3	2	5	5	2
Colby Cave^{‡}	20	1	4	5	–1	8
Marcus Johansson^{†}	10	1	2	3	–1	0
Anders Bjork	20	1	2	3	–1	2
Jeremy Lauzon	16	1	0	1	–1	2
Zachary Senyshyn	2	1	0	1	0	0
Connor Clifton	19	0	1	1	5	15
Anton Blidh	1	0	0	0	0	0
Paul Carey^{†}	2	0	0	0	0	0
Gemel Smith^{†}	3	0	0	0	–3	0
Trent Frederic	15	0	0	0	–4	15
Urho Vaakanainen	2	0	0	0	–1	0
Lee Stempniak	2	0	0	0	–1	0
Jakub Zboril	2	0	0	0	0	0

Playoffs
Player	GP	G	A	Pts	+/−	PIM
Brad Marchand	24	9	14	23	4	14
David Pastrnak	24	9	10	19	0	4
Torey Krug	24	2	16	18	4	10
Patrice Bergeron	24	9	8	17	4	12
Charlie Coyle	24	9	7	16	8	12
David Krejci	24	4	12	16	5	8
Jake DeBrusk	24	4	7	11	4	10
Marcus Johansson	22	4	7	11	0	0
Sean Kuraly	20	4	6	10	4	8
Matt Grzelcyk	20	4	4	8	–3	6
Joakim Nordstrom	23	3	5	8	2	4
Charlie McAvoy	23	2	6	8	4	16
Danton Heinen	24	2	6	8	7	2
Zdeno Chara	23	2	4	6	11	16
David Backes	15	2	3	5	1	2
Connor Clifton	18	2	3	5	2	16
Brandon Carlo	24	2	2	4	10	6
Noel Acciari	19	2	2	4	2	0
Karson Kuhlman	8	1	2	3	1	0
Chris Wagner	12	2	0	2	–3	2
Steven Kampfer	3	1	0	1	0	0
John Moore	10	0	0	0	–3	0

=== Goaltenders ===
Regular season
Player	GP	GS	TOI	W	L	OT	GA	GAA	SA	SV%	SO	G	A	PIM
Tuukka Rask	46	45	2,635:09	27	13	5	109	2.48	1,245	.912	4	0	2	4
Jaroslav Halak	40	37	2,308:07	22	11	4	90	2.34	1,158	.922	5	0	4	0

Playoffs
Player	GP	GS	TOI	W	L	GA	GAA	SA	SV%	SO	G	A	PIM
Tuukka Rask	24	24	1,458:50	15	9	49	2.02	742	.934	2	0	0	0

^{†}Denotes player spent time with another team before joining the Bruins. Stats reflect time with the Bruins only.
^{‡}Denotes player was traded mid-season. Stats reflect time with the Bruins only.
Bold/italics denotes franchise record.

== Transactions ==
The Bruins have been involved in the following transactions during the 2018–19 season.

=== Trades ===
Date	Details		Ref
September 11, 2018	To New York Rangers Adam McQuaid	To Boston Bruins Steven Kampfer; 4th-round pick in 2019	
January 11, 2019	To Ottawa Senators Cody Goloubef	To Boston Bruins Paul Carey	
February 20, 2019	To Minnesota Wild Ryan Donato; Conditional 5th-round pick in 2019	To Boston Bruins Charlie Coyle	
February 25, 2019	To New Jersey Devils 2nd-round pick in 2019; 4th-round pick in 2020	To Boston Bruins Marcus Johansson	

=== Free agents ===
Date	Player	Team	Contract term	Ref
June 30, 2018	Chris Breen	to Providence Bruins (AHL)	Unknown	
July 1, 2018	Kenny Agostino	to Montreal Canadiens	1-year	
July 1, 2018	Tommy Cross	to Columbus Blue Jackets	1-year	
July 1, 2018	Austin Czarnik	to Calgary Flames	2-year	
July 1, 2018	Cody Goloubef	from Calgary Flames	1-year	
July 1, 2018	Jaroslav Halak	from New York Islanders	2-year	
July 1, 2018	Nick Holden	to Vegas Golden Knights	2-year	
July 1, 2018	Anton Khudobin	to Dallas Stars	2-year	
July 1, 2018	Mark McNeill	from Nashville Predators	1-year	
July 1, 2018	John Moore	from New Jersey Devils	5-year	
July 1, 2018	Riley Nash	to Columbus Blue Jackets	3-year	
July 1, 2018	Joakim Nordstrom	from Carolina Hurricanes	2-year	
July 1, 2018	Tim Schaller	to Vancouver Canucks	2-year	
July 1, 2018	Chris Wagner	from New York Islanders	2-year	
August 15, 2018	Paul Postma	to Ak Bars Kazan (KHL)	1-year	
August 15, 2018	Tommy Wingels	to Genève-Servette (NL)	1-year	
February 24, 2019	Lee Stempniak	from Providence Bruins (AHL)	1-year	
May 13, 2019	Emil Johansson	to HV71 (SHL)	3-year	
May 21, 2019	Jakob Forsbacka Karlsson	to Växjö Lakers (SHL)	2-year	

=== Waivers ===
Date	Player	Team	Ref
December 6, 2018	Gemel Smith	from Dallas Stars	
January 15, 2019	Colby Cave	to Edmonton Oilers	

=== Contract terminations ===
Date	Player	Via	Ref
December 11, 2018	Martin Bakos	Mutual termination	
April 17, 2019	Jesse Gabrielle	Mutual termination	

=== Retirement ===
Date	Player	Ref
September 24, 2018	Brian Gionta	

=== Signings ===
Date	Player	Contract term	Ref
July 1, 2018	Axel Andersson	3-year	
July 3, 2018	Anton Blidh	1-year	
July 3, 2018	Sean Kuraly	3-year	
July 14, 2018	Colby Cave	2-year	
March 23, 2019	Zdeno Chara	1-year	
March 26, 2019	Paul Carey	2-year	
May 1, 2019	Anton Blidh	2-year	
May 3, 2019	Oskar Steen	3-year	

== Draft picks ==
Below are the Boston Bruins' selections at the 2018 NHL entry draft, which was held on June 22 and 23, 2018, at the American Airlines Center in Dallas, Texas.

Round	#	Player	Pos	Nationality	College/Junior/Club team (League)
2	57	Axel Andersson	D	Sweden	Djurgardens IF J20 (SuperElit)
3	77^{1}	Jakub Lauko	C	Czech Republic	Piráti Chomutov (ELH)
4	119	Curtis Hall	C	United States	Youngstown Phantoms (USHL)
6	181	Dustyn McFaul	D	Canada	Pickering Panthers (OJHL)
7	212	Pavel Shen	C	Russia	Mamonty Yugry (MHL)

Notes:

1. The Florida Panthers' third-round pick went to the Boston Bruins as the result of a trade on February 22, 2018, that sent Frank Vatrano to Florida in exchange for this pick.
