= 2018–19 Philadelphia Flyers season =

NHL hockey team season

2018–19 Philadelphia Flyers
- Division: 6th Metropolitan
- Conference: 11th Eastern
- 2018–19 record: 37–37–8
- Home record: 19–18–4
- Road record: 18–19–4
- Goals for: 244
- Goals against: 281

Team information
- President: Paul Holmgren
- General manager: Ron Hextall (Oct.–Nov.); Chuck Fletcher (Dec.–Apr.)
- Coach: Dave Hakstol (Oct.–Dec.); Scott Gordon (Dec.–Apr.)
- Captain: Claude Giroux
- Alternate captains: Sean Couturier (Note: The second alternate captain was Couturier for home games and MacDonald for road games until Simmonds was traded on February 25.); Andrew MacDonald; Wayne Simmonds (Oct.–Feb.)
- Arena: Wells Fargo Center
- Average attendance: 20,371
- Minor league affiliates: Lehigh Valley Phantoms (AHL); Reading Royals (ECHL)

Team leaders
- Goals: Sean Couturier (33)
- Assists: Claude Giroux (63)
- Points: Claude Giroux (85)
- Penalty minutes: Wayne Simmonds (90)
- Plus/minus: Claude Giroux (+9)
- Wins: Carter Hart (16)
- Goals against average: Carter Hart (2.83)

The 2018–19 Philadelphia Flyers season was the 52nd season for the National Hockey League (NHL) franchise that was established on June 5, 1967. The Flyers were eliminated from playoff contention on March 30, 2019, after a 5–2 loss to the Carolina Hurricanes.

== Regular season ==
After losing five out of six games in the second half of November, general manager Ron Hextall was fired on November 27. Assistant general manager Chris Pryor and assistant coach Gord Murphy were also fired a day later. Former Minnesota Wild general manager Chuck Fletcher was named Hextall's replacement on December 3. After a four-game losing streak two weeks later, head coach Dave Hakstol was fired on December 17 and replaced on an interim basis by Lehigh Valley Phantoms head coach Scott Gordon. The team set an NHL record for most goalies used in a season with 8.

=== Standings ===
Metropolitan Division
Pos	Team	GP	W	L	OTL	ROW	GF	GA	GD	Pts
1	y – Washington Capitals	82	48	26	8	44	278	249	+29	104
2	x – New York Islanders	82	48	27	7	43	228	196	+32	103
3	x – Pittsburgh Penguins	82	44	26	12	42	273	241	+32	100
4	x – Carolina Hurricanes	82	46	29	7	44	245	223	+22	99
5	x – Columbus Blue Jackets	82	47	31	4	45	258	232	+26	98
6	Philadelphia Flyers	82	37	37	8	34	244	281	−37	82
7	New York Rangers	82	32	36	14	26	227	272	−45	78
8	New Jersey Devils	82	31	41	10	28	222	275	−53	72

Source: National Hockey League
x – Clinched playoff spot; y – Clinched division

Eastern Conference Wild Card
Pos	Div	Team	GP	W	L	OTL	ROW	GF	GA	GD	Pts
1	ME	x – Carolina Hurricanes	82	46	29	7	44	245	223	+22	99
2	ME	x – Columbus Blue Jackets	82	47	31	4	45	258	232	+26	98
3	AT	Montreal Canadiens	82	44	30	8	41	249	236	+13	96
4	AT	Florida Panthers	82	36	32	14	33	267	280	−13	86
5	ME	Philadelphia Flyers	82	37	37	8	34	244	281	−37	82
6	ME	New York Rangers	82	32	36	14	26	227	272	−45	78
7	AT	Buffalo Sabres	82	33	39	10	28	226	271	−45	76
8	AT	Detroit Red Wings	82	32	40	10	29	227	277	−50	74
9	ME	New Jersey Devils	82	31	41	10	28	222	275	−53	72
10	AT	Ottawa Senators	82	29	47	6	29	242	302	−60	64

Source: National Hockey League
x – Clinched playoff spot

== Schedule and results ==
=== Preseason ===
The preseason schedule was published on June 15, 2018.

2018 preseason
Preseason: 4–3–1 (home: 1–2–1; road: 3–1–0)

Game	Date	Visitor	Score	Home	OT	Decision	Attendance	Record	Recap
1^{[a]}	September 16	Philadelphia	0–3	NY Islanders		Stolarz	–	0–1–0	L
2	September 17	NY Islanders	1–3	Philadelphia		Neuvirth	17,725	1–1–0	W
3	September 18	Philadelphia	5–1	NY Islanders		Lyon	4,744	2–1–0	W
4	September 19	Philadelphia	6–4	NY Rangers		Elliott	12,159	3–1–0	W
5^{[b]}	September 21	NY Islanders	3–2	Philadelphia	OT	Stolarz	–	3–1–1	OTL
6	September 24	Boston	4–3	Philadelphia		Elliott	18,955	3–2–1	L
7	September 27	NY Rangers	4–2	Philadelphia		Hart	18,900	3–3–1	L
8	September 29	Philadelphia	4–1	Boston		Elliott	17,565	4–3–1	W
Notes:^{a} Game was played at Nassau Veterans Memorial Coliseum in Uniondale, New York.^{b} Game was played at PPL Center in Allentown, Pennsylvania.

Legend: W Win (2 points) L Loss (0 points) OTL Overtime/shootout loss (1 point)

=== Regular season ===
The regular season schedule was published on June 21, 2018.

2018–19 regular season
October: 5–7–0 (home: 2–4–0; road: 3–3–0)

Game	Date	Visitor	Score	Home	OT	Decision	Attendance	Record	Points	Recap
1	October 4	Philadelphia	5–2	Vegas		Elliott	18,555	1–0–0	2	W
2	October 6	Philadelphia	2–5	Colorado		Elliott	16,768	1–1–0	2	L
3	October 9	San Jose	8–2	Philadelphia		Elliott	19,133	1–2–0	2	L
4	October 10	Philadelphia	7–4	Ottawa		Pickard	13,215	2–2–0	4	W
5	October 13	Vegas	1–0	Philadelphia		Elliott	19,067	2–3–0	4	L
6	October 16	Florida	5–6	Philadelphia	SO	Pickard	19,038	3–3–0	6	W
7	October 18	Philadelphia	3–6	Columbus		Pickard	13,492	3–4–0	6	L
8	October 20	New Jersey	2–5	Philadelphia		Elliott	19,105	4–4–0	8	W
9	October 22	Colorado	4–1	Philadelphia		Elliott	19,326	4–5–0	8	L
10	October 25	Philadelphia	0–3	Boston		Elliott	17,565	4–6–0	8	L
11	October 27	NY Islanders	6–1	Philadelphia		Neuvirth	19,247	4–7–0	8	L
12	October 30	Philadelphia	3–2	Anaheim		Elliott	16,450	5–7–0	10	W

November: 5–5–2 (home: 3–3–1; road: 2–2–1)

Game	Date	Visitor	Score	Home	OT	Decision	Attendance	Record	Points	Recap
13	November 1	Philadelphia	5–2	Los Angeles		Elliott	18,230	6–7–0	12	W
14	November 3	Philadelphia	3–4	San Jose	OT	Pickard	17,562	6–7–1	13	OTL
15	November 5	Philadelphia	5–2	Arizona		Pickard	13,719	7–7–1	15	W
16	November 8	Arizona	4–5	Philadelphia	OT	Elliott	18,884	8–7–1	17	W
17	November 10	Chicago	0–4	Philadelphia		Elliott	19,355	9–7–1	19	W
18	November 13	Florida	2–1	Philadelphia		Elliott	19,147	9–8–1	19	L
19	November 15	New Jersey	3–0	Philadelphia		Elliott	18,806	9–9–1	19	L
20	November 17	Tampa Bay	6–5	Philadelphia	OT	Pickard	19,060	9–9–2	20	OTL
21	November 21	Philadelphia	2–5	Buffalo		Lyon	19,070	9–10–2	20	L
22	November 23	NY Rangers	0–4	Philadelphia		Pickard	19,523	10–10–2	22	W
23	November 24	Philadelphia	0–6	Toronto		Pickard	19,373	10–11–2	22	L
24	November 27	Ottawa	4–3	Philadelphia		Stolarz	19,083	10–12–2	22	L

December: 5–6–3 (home: 2–1–1; road: 3–5–2)

Game	Date	Visitor	Score	Home	OT	Decision	Attendance	Record	Points	Recap
25	December 1	Philadelphia	4–2	Pittsburgh		Stolarz	18,653	11–12–2	24	W
26	December 6	Columbus	4–3	Philadelphia	OT	Stolarz	19,428	11–12–3	25	OTL
27	December 8	Philadelphia	6–2	Buffalo		Stolarz	18,283	12–12–3	27	W
28	December 9	Philadelphia	1–7	Winnipeg		Neuvirth	15,321	12–13–3	27	L
29	December 12	Philadelphia	5–6	Calgary	OT	Stolarz	17,763	12–13–4	28	OTL
30	December 14	Philadelphia	1–4	Edmonton		Stolarz	18,347	12–14–4	28	L
31	December 15	Philadelphia	1–5	Vancouver		Stolarz	17,328	12–15–4	28	L
32	December 18	Detroit	2–3	Philadelphia		Hart	19,255	13–15–4	30	W
33	December 20	Nashville	1–2	Philadelphia		Hart	19,142	14–15–4	32	W
34	December 22	Columbus	4–3	Philadelphia		Hart	19,311	14–16–4	32	L
35	December 23	Philadelphia	3–2	NY Rangers	SO	Neuvirth	17,515	15–16–4	34	W
36	December 27	Philadelphia	5–6	Tampa Bay	OT	Neuvirth	19,092	15–16–5	35	OTL
37	December 29	Philadelphia	1–2	Florida		Hart	15,737	15–17–5	35	L
38	December 31	Philadelphia	1–3	Carolina		Hart	16,644	15–18–5	35	L

January: 7–5–1 (home: 4–2–1; road: 3–3–0)

Game	Date	Visitor	Score	Home	OT	Decision	Attendance	Record	Points	Recap
39	January 1	Philadelphia	0–4	Nashville		Neuvirth	17,481	15–19–5	35	L
40	January 3	Carolina	5–3	Philadelphia		Neuvirth	18,718	15–20–5	35	L
41	January 5	Calgary	3–2	Philadelphia	OT	Hart	19,236	15–20–6	36	OTL
42	January 7	St. Louis	3–0	Philadelphia		Hart	19,021	15–21–6	36	L
43	January 8	Philadelphia	3–5	Washington		McKenna	18,506	15–22–6	36	L
44	January 10	Dallas	1–2	Philadelphia		Hart	19,448	16–22–6	38	W
45	January 12	Philadelphia	2–3	New Jersey		Hart	16,514	16–23–6	38	L
46	January 14	Minnesota	4–7	Philadelphia		Hart	19,123	17–23–6	40	W
47	January 16	Boston	3–4	Philadelphia		Hart	19,297	18–23–6	42	W
48	January 19	Philadelphia	5–2	Montreal		Hart	21,302	19–23–6	44	W
49	January 28	Winnipeg	1–3	Philadelphia		Hart	19,087	20–23–6	46	W
50	January 29	Philadelphia	1–0	NY Rangers		Stolarz	17,163	21–23–6	48	W
51	January 31	Philadelphia	3–2	Boston	OT	Hart	17,565	22–23–6	50	W

February: 8–3–2 (home: 6–2–1; road: 2–1–1)

Game	Date	Visitor	Score	Home	OT	Decision	Attendance	Record	Points	Recap
52	February 2	Edmonton	4–5	Philadelphia	OT	Hart	19,526	23–23–6	52	W
53	February 4	Vancouver	1–2	Philadelphia		Hart	18,671	24–23–6	54	W
54	February 7	Los Angeles	3–2	Philadelphia	SO	Stolarz	18,982	24–23–7	55	OTL
55	February 9	Anaheim	2–6	Philadelphia		Hart	19,072	25–23–7	57	W
56	February 11	Pittsburgh	4–1	Philadelphia		Hart	19,103	25–24–7	57	L
57	February 12	Philadelphia	5–4	Minnesota		Stolarz	18,607	26–24–7	59	W
58	February 16	Detroit	5–6	Philadelphia	OT	Hart	19,342	27–24–7	61	W
59	February 17	Philadelphia	3–1	Detroit		Hart	19,515	28–24–7	63	W
60	February 19	Tampa Bay	5–2	Philadelphia		Hart	18,932	28–25–7	63	L
61	February 21	Philadelphia	1–5	Montreal		Hart	21,302	28–26–7	63	L
62	February 23	Pittsburgh	3–4	Philadelphia	OT	Elliott	69,620 (outdoors)	29–26–7	65	W
63	February 26	Buffalo	2–5	Philadelphia		Elliott	18,466	30–26–7	67	W
64	February 28	Philadelphia	3–4	Columbus	OT	Elliott	17,169	30–26–8	68	OTL

March: 7–8–0 (home: 2–5–0; road: 5–3–0)

Game	Date	Visitor	Score	Home	OT	Decision	Attendance	Record	Points	Recap
65	March 1	Philadelphia	6–3	New Jersey		Talbot	15,247	31–26–8	70	W
66	March 3	Philadelphia	4–1	NY Islanders		Elliott	13,917	32–26–8	72	W
67	March 6	Washington	5–3	Philadelphia		Elliott	19,232	32–27–8	72	L
68	March 9	Philadelphia	5–2	NY Islanders		Elliott	13,917	33–27–8	74	W
69	March 11	Ottawa	2–3	Philadelphia		Elliott	18,193	34–27–8	76	W
70	March 14	Washington	5–2	Philadelphia		Hart	19,475	34–28–8	76	L
71	March 15	Philadelphia	6–7	Toronto		Elliott	19,290	34–29–8	76	L
72	March 17	Philadelphia	2–1	Pittsburgh	OT	Hart	18,636	35–29–8	78	W
73	March 19	Montreal	3–1	Philadelphia		Hart	19,045	35–30–8	78	L
74	March 21	Philadelphia	3–1	Chicago		Hart	21,484	36–30–8	80	W
75	March 23	NY Islanders	4–2	Philadelphia		Hart	19,668	36–31–8	80	L
76	March 24	Philadelphia	1–3	Washington		Elliott	18,506	36–32–8	80	L
77	March 27	Toronto	4–5	Philadelphia	SO	Hart	19,205	37–32–8	82	W
78	March 30	Philadelphia	2–5	Carolina		Talbot	17,833	37–33–8	82	L
79	March 31	NY Rangers	3–0	Philadelphia		Hart	19,437	37–34–8	82	L

April: 0–3–0 (home: 0–1–0; road: 0–2–0)

Game	Date	Visitor	Score	Home	OT	Decision	Attendance	Record	Points	Recap
80	April 2	Philadelphia	2–6	Dallas		Talbot	18,532	37–35–8	82	L
81	April 4	Philadelphia	3–7	St. Louis		Elliott	18,203	37–36–8	82	L
82	April 6	Carolina	4–3	Philadelphia		Hart	19,433	37–37–8	82	L

Legend: W Win (2 points) L Loss (0 points) OTL Overtime/shootout loss (1 point)

== Player statistics ==
=== Scoring ===
- Position abbreviations: C = Center; D = Defense; G = Goaltender; LW = Left wing; RW = Right wing
- † = Joined team via a transaction (e.g., trade, waivers, signing) during the season. Stats reflect time with the Flyers only.
- ‡ = Left team via a transaction (e.g., trade, waivers, release) during the season. Stats reflect time with the Flyers only.

No.	Player	Pos	Regular season					
No.	Player	Pos	GP	G	A	Pts	+/-	PIM
28	Claude Giroux	LW	82	22	63	85	9	24
14	Sean Couturier	C	80	33	43	76	2	34
93	Jakub Voracek	RW	78	20	46	66	−16	25
11	Travis Konecny	C	82	24	25	49	−4	40
25	James van Riemsdyk	LW	66	27	21	48	−10	18
53	Shayne Gostisbehere	D	78	9	28	37	−20	22
6	Travis Sanheim	D	82	9	26	35	−4	22
23	Oskar Lindblom	LW	81	17	16	33	−9	20
21	Scott Laughton	C	82	12	20	32	−11	53
19	Nolan Patrick	C	72	13	18	31	−8	27
17	Wayne Simmonds‡	RW	62	16	11	27	−20	90
9	Ivan Provorov	D	82	7	19	26	−16	32
8	Robert Hagg	D	82	5	15	20	−3	63
3	Radko Gudas	D	77	4	16	20	6	63
12	Michael Raffl	LW	67	6	12	18	−1	32
22	Dale Weise‡	RW	42	5	6	11	−6	15
40	Jordan Weal‡	C	28	3	6	9	−5	16
47	Andrew MacDonald	D	47	0	9	9	−5	18
44	Phil Varone	C	47	3	4	7	−2	8
38	Ryan Hartman†	RW	19	2	4	6	−6	30
10	Corban Knight	C	23	1	3	4	−5	0
15	Jori Lehtera	C	27	1	2	3	−7	33
61	Philippe Myers	D	21	1	1	2	−5	2
24	Mikhail Vorobyev	C	15	1	1	2	0	2
26	Christian Folin‡	D	26	0	2	2	5	16
27	Justin Bailey†	RW	11	0	1	1	0	2
37	Brian Elliott	G	26	0	1	1		2
62	Nicolas Aube-Kubel	RW	9	0	0	0	1	0
59	Mark Friedman	D	1	0	0	0	−1	0
39	Tyrell Goulbourne	LW	2	0	0	0	0	0
79	Carter Hart	G	31	0	0	0		0
34	Alex Lyon	G	2	0	0	0		0
56	Mike McKenna†	G	1	0	0	0		0
5	Samuel Morin	D	5	0	0	0	−3	4
30	Michal Neuvirth	G	7	0	0	0		0
33	Calvin Pickard‡	G	11	0	0	0		2
41	Anthony Stolarz‡	G	12	0	0	0		0
33	Cam Talbot†	G	4	0	0	0		0

=== Goaltending ===
- † = Joined team via a transaction (e.g., trade, waivers, signing) during the season. Stats reflect time with the Flyers only.
- ‡ = Left team via a transaction (e.g., trade, waivers, release) during the season. Stats reflect time with the Flyers only.

No.	Player	Regular season										
No.	Player	GP	GS	W	L	OT	SA	GA	GAA	SV%	SO	TOI
79	Carter Hart	31	30	16	13	1	976	81	2.83	.917	0	1,717
37	Brian Elliott	26	23	11	11	1	741	69	2.96	.907	1	1,397
33	Calvin Pickard‡	11	8	4	2	2	227	31	4.01	.863	1	464
41	Anthony Stolarz‡	12	10	4	3	3	358	35	3.33	.902	1	630
30	Michal Neuvirth	7	6	1	4	1	184	26	4.27	.859	0	366
33	Cam Talbot†	4	3	1	2	0	109	13	3.70	.881	0	211
34	Alex Lyon	2	1	0	1	0	31	6	5.08	.806	0	71
56	Mike McKenna†	1	1	0	1	0	24	4	4.22	.833	0	57

== Awards and records ==
=== Awards ===
Type	Award/honor	Recipient	Ref
League (in-season)	NHL All-Star Game selection	Claude Giroux	
League (in-season)	NHL Rookie of the Month	Carter Hart (January)	
League (in-season)	NHL Second Star of the Week	Carter Hart (February 4)	
League (in-season)	NHL Third Star of the Week	Claude Giroux (November 12)	
Team	Barry Ashbee Trophy	Radko Gudas	
Team	Bobby Clarke Trophy	Sean Couturier	
Team	Gene Hart Memorial Award	Sean Couturier	
Team	Pelle Lindbergh Memorial Trophy	Travis Sanheim	
Team	Toyota Cup	Carter Hart	
Team	Yanick Dupre Memorial Class Guy Award	Andrew MacDonald	

=== Records ===
Among the team records set during the 2018–19 season was for the most shots on goal during a single period (28) on February 11. The Flyers' one-shootout loss is tied for the fewest in team history.

=== Milestones ===
Milestone	Player	Date	Ref
First game	Mikhail Vorobyev	October 4, 2018	
First game	Nicolas Aube-Kubel	October 30, 2018	
First game	Carter Hart	December 18, 2018	
First game	Philippe Myers	February 17, 2019	
First game	Mark Friedman	April 6, 2019	

== Transactions ==
The Flyers have been involved in the following transactions during the 2018–19 season.

=== Trades ===
Date	Details		Ref
June 23, 2018	To Montreal Canadiens: MTL's 7th-round pick in 2018	To Philadelphia Flyers: 7th-round pick in 2019	
January 11, 2019	To Arizona Coyotes: Jordan Weal	To Philadelphia Flyers: Jacob Graves; 6th-round pick in 2019	
January 17, 2019	To Buffalo Sabres: Taylor Leier	To Philadelphia Flyers: Justin Bailey	
February 9, 2019	To Montreal Canadiens: Christian Folin (Note: The Flyers retained 18.75% of Folin's salary.); Dale Weise	To Philadelphia Flyers: Byron Froese; David Schlemko	
February 15, 2019	To Edmonton Oilers: Anthony Stolarz	To Philadelphia Flyers: Cam Talbot	
February 25, 2019	To Nashville Predators: Wayne Simmonds	To Philadelphia Flyers: Ryan Hartman; Conditional 4th-round pick in 2020 (Note: The draft pick would have upgraded to a 3rd-round pick if Nashville won a first round series in the 2019 Stanley Cup playoffs, which they did not.)	
June 3, 2019	To Winnipeg Jets: 5th-round pick in 2019	To Philadelphia Flyers: Kevin Hayes	
June 14, 2019	To Washington Capitals: Radko Gudas (Note: Philadelphia retained 30% ($1.005 million) of salary as part of trade.)	To Philadelphia Flyers: Matt Niskanen	
June 18, 2019	To San Jose Sharks: 2nd-round pick in 2019; 3rd-round pick in 2020	To Philadelphia Flyers: Justin Braun	

=== Players acquired ===
Date	Player	Former team	Term	Via	Ref
July 1, 2018	James van Riemsdyk	Toronto Maple Leafs	5-year	Free agency	
July 5, 2018	Christian Folin	Los Angeles Kings	1-year	Free agency	
September 20, 2018	Egor Zamula	Calgary Hitmen (WHL)	3-year	Free agency	
October 2, 2018	Calvin Pickard	Toronto Maple Leafs		Waivers	
January 4, 2019	Mike McKenna	Vancouver Canucks		Waivers	

=== Players lost ===
Date	Player	New team	Term	Via (Note: In parentheses is the player's free agency group on July 1 if applicable.)	Ref
July 1, 2018	Valtteri Filppula	New York Islanders	1-year	Free agency (III)	
July 1, 2018	Brandon Manning	Chicago Blackhawks	2-year	Free agency (III)	
July 1, 2018	Petr Mrazek	Carolina Hurricanes	1-year	Free agency (UFA)	
July 1, 2018	John Muse	Pittsburgh Penguins	1-year	Free agency (III)	
July 1, 2018	Johnny Oduya			Contract expiration (III)	
July 9, 2018	Will O'Neill	Wilkes-Barre/Scranton Penguins (AHL)	1-year	Free agency (III)	
July 30, 2018	Matt Read	Minnesota Wild	1-year	Free agency (III)	
August 20, 2018	Dustin Tokarski	New York Rangers	1-year	Free agency (III)	
September 22, 2018	Danick Martel	Tampa Bay Lightning		Waivers	
November 29, 2018	Calvin Pickard	Arizona Coyotes		Waivers	
December 20, 2018	Radel Fazleev			Mutual termination	
December 25, 2018	Radel Fazleev	Ak Bars Kazan (KHL)	1-year	Free agency	
May 28, 2019	Corban Knight	Barys Astana (KHL)	1-year	Free agency	
June 6, 2019	Jori Lehtera	SKA Saint Petersburg (KHL)	1-year	Free agency	
June 16, 2019	Andrew MacDonald			Buyout	

=== Signings ===
Date	Player	Term	Contract type	Ref
June 26, 2018	Samuel Morin	3-year	Re-signing	
July 7, 2018	Alex Lyon	2-year	Re-signing	
July 12, 2018	Reece Willcox	2-year	Re-signing	
July 15, 2018	Tyrell Goulbourne	1-year	Re-signing	
July 15, 2018	Taylor Leier	1-year	Re-signing	
July 15, 2018	Danick Martel	1-year	Re-signing	
July 18, 2018	Anthony Stolarz	1-year	Re-signing	
August 1, 2018	Robert Hagg	2-year	Re-signing	
March 25, 2019	Joel Farabee	3-year	Entry-level	
March 26, 2019	Michael Raffl	2-year	Extension	
May 1, 2019	Kirill Ustimenko	3-year	Entry-level	
June 19, 2019	Kevin Hayes	7-year	Extension	

== Draft picks ==
Below are the Philadelphia Flyers' selections at the 2018 NHL entry draft, which was held on June 22 and 23, 2018, at the American Airlines Center in Dallas, Texas.

Round	Pick	Player	Position	Nationality	Team (league)	Notes
1	14	Joel Farabee	Left wing	United States	U.S. National Team Development Program (USHL)	(Note: The Flyers acquired Jori Lehtera, a 2017 first-round pick, and this pick in a trade with the St. Louis Blues for Brayden Schenn on June 23, 2017.)
1	19	Jay O'Brien	Center	United States	Thayer Academy (USHS)	
2	50	Adam Ginning	Defense	Sweden	Linkopings HC (SHL)	
4	112	Jack St. Ivany	Defense	United States	Sioux Falls Stampede (USHL)	
5	127	Wyatte Wylie	Defense	United States	Everett Silvertips (WHL)	(Note: The Flyers acquired the rights to Brendan Warren and this pick in a trade with the Arizona Coyotes in exchange for Nick Cousins and the rights to Merrick Madsen on June 16, 2017.)
5	143	Samuel Ersson	Goaltender	Sweden	Brynas IF (SHL)	
6	174	Gavin Hain	Center	United States	U.S. National Team Development Program (USHL)	
7	205	Marcus Westfalt	Center	Sweden	Brynas IF (SHL)	
