= 2018–19 St. Louis Blues season =

NHL team season; 2019 Stanley Cup Champions

2018–19 St. Louis Blues
- Stanley Cup champions
- Western Conference champions
- Division: 3rd Central
- Conference: 5th Western
- 2018–19 record: 45–28–9
- Home record: 24–15–2
- Road record: 21–13–7
- Goals for: 247
- Goals against: 223

Team information
- General manager: Doug Armstrong
- Coach: Mike Yeo (Oct. 4 – Nov. 19); Craig Berube (Nov. 19 – Jun. 12)
- Captain: Alex Pietrangelo
- Alternate captains: Alexander Steen; Vladimir Tarasenko
- Arena: Enterprise Center
- Average attendance: 17,361
- Minor league affiliates: San Antonio Rampage (AHL); Tulsa Oilers (ECHL)

Team leaders
- Goals: Vladimir Tarasenko (33)
- Assists: Ryan O'Reilly (49)
- Points: Ryan O'Reilly (77)
- Penalty minutes: Joel Edmundson (68)
- Plus/minus: Ryan O'Reilly (+22)
- Wins: Jordan Binnington (24)
- Goals against average: Jordan Binnington (1.89)

The 2018–19 St. Louis Blues season was the 52nd season for the National Hockey League (NHL) franchise that was established on June 5, 1967. The Blues were in last place in the league in January, but rallied to make the playoffs. They advanced to the 2019 Stanley Cup Finals against the Boston Bruins and won in seven games, their first Stanley Cup in the franchise's 52-year history.

The Blues became the fourth St. Louis-based professional sports team to win a major championship, joining the 11-time World Series champions St. Louis Cardinals of Major League Baseball (MLB), the 1957–58 St. Louis Hawks of the National Basketball Association (NBA), and the 1999 St. Louis Rams of the National Football League (NFL). This made St. Louis the eighth city to win a championship in each of the four major U.S. sports.

== Off-season ==
On May 30, 2018, the Blues named Mike Van Ryn as assistant coach, replacing Darryl Sydor, who stepped down to spend more time with his family. Van Ryn played the first three seasons (2000–2003) of his eight years in the NHL with the Blues, scoring 13 points in 69 games.

The Blues extended their affiliation with the Tulsa Oilers of the ECHL on May 31.

== Season summary ==
The Blues started the season sluggish, and head coach Mike Yeo was fired on November 19 with the team's record at 7–9–3. Craig Berube, who had served as assistant coach with the Blues since 2017, was named the interim head coach. St. Louis began the 2019 calendar year with the worst record in the league; 15–18–4 and 34 points recorded. Soon after, rookie goaltender Jordan Binnington joined the team. On January 7, he won his first game in a shutout and took over as the team's starting goaltender. The Blues then went on a franchise-record 11-game winning streak and had a 30–10–5 run to finish the season. They clinched a playoff spot on March 29, 2019.

In the playoffs, the Blues defeated the Winnipeg Jets, Dallas Stars, and San Jose Sharks to advance to the 2019 Stanley Cup Finals, where they faced the Boston Bruins. It was their first Finals appearance since 1970. On May 29, 2019, St. Louis won a Stanley Cup Finals game for the first time in franchise history as they defeated the Bruins 3–2 in overtime in Game 2; the team was swept in their three previous finals trips (1968, 1969, and 1970). On June 12, 2019, they defeated the Bruins in seven games to win the first Stanley Cup title in franchise history. Until then, they were the oldest franchise to have never won a Stanley Cup.

Ryan O'Reilly, who had been acquired in a trade during the previous offseason, was the Blues' top regular season scorer with 77 points. He then had a franchise-record 23 playoff points and won the Conn Smythe Trophy as the most valuable player in the playoffs. O'Reilly also won the Frank J. Selke Trophy for the league's best defensive forward during the regular season.

== "Gloria" ==
St. Louis had been in last place in the NHL on January 3. On the night of January 6, a few Blues players were in a Philadelphia bar watching the National Football League "Double Doink" wildcard game between the Philadelphia Eagles and Chicago Bears. The DJ played the 1982 Laura Branigan song "Gloria", and according to defenceman Joel Edmundson, "this one guy looked at the DJ and said, 'Keep playing "Gloria"!' so they kept playing it. Everyone would get up and start singing and dancing. We just sat back and watched it happen. Right there we decided we should play the song after our wins." The following day, goaltender Jordan Binnington made his first start for the Blues that season and won the game with a shutout.

The team played it after every win for the rest of the regular season and playoffs, and as their hot streak continued, the song became popular in the city of St. Louis. "Gloria" was written on signs and t-shirts. The St. Louis radio station KYKY played it for 24 hours straight after series victories in the playoffs.

== Standings ==
=== Divisional standings ===
Central Division
Pos	Team	GP	W	L	OTL	ROW	GF	GA	GD	Pts
1	y – Nashville Predators	82	47	29	6	43	240	214	+26	100
2	x – Winnipeg Jets	82	47	30	5	45	272	244	+28	99
3	x – St. Louis Blues	82	45	28	9	42	247	223	+24	99
4	x – Dallas Stars	82	43	32	7	42	210	202	+8	93
5	x – Colorado Avalanche	82	38	30	14	36	260	246	+14	90
6	Chicago Blackhawks	82	36	34	12	33	270	292	−22	84
7	Minnesota Wild	82	37	36	9	36	211	237	−26	83

Source: National Hockey League
x – Clinched playoff spot; y – Clinched division

=== Conference standings ===
Top 3 (Central Division)
Pos	Team	GP	W	L	OTL	ROW	GF	GA	GD	Pts
1	y – Nashville Predators	82	47	29	6	43	240	214	+26	100
2	x – Winnipeg Jets	82	47	30	5	45	272	244	+28	99
3	x – St. Louis Blues	82	45	28	9	42	247	223	+24	99

Source: National Hockey League
x – Clinched playoff spot; y – Clinched division

== Schedule and results ==
=== Preseason ===
The preseason schedule was published on June 15, 2018.

2018 preseason game log: 4–3–0 (Home: 2–1–0; Road: 2–2–0)
#	Date	Visitor	Score	Home	OT	Decision	Attendance	Record	Recap
1	September 18	St. Louis	3–5	Dallas		Binnington	11,125	0–1–0
2^{[a]}	September 19	St. Louis	3–2	Minnesota		Husso	14,290	1–1–0
3	September 21	Columbus	0–3	St. Louis		Johnson	15,190	2–1–0
4	September 23	St. Louis	5–1	Columbus		Husso	11,758	3–1–0
5	September 25	Washington	4–0	St. Louis		Allen	15,769	3–2–0
6	September 28	Dallas	1–3	St. Louis		Allen	17,363	4–2–0
7	September 30	St. Louis	2–5	Washington		Johnson	14,894	4–3–0
Notes:^{a} Game was played at Wells Fargo Arena in Des Moines, Iowa.

=== Regular season ===
The regular season schedule was released on June 21, 2018.

2018–19 game log

October: 3–4–3 (Home: 2–3–1; Road: 1–1–2)
#	Date	Visitor	Score	Home	OT	Decision	Attendance	Record	Pts	Recap
1	October 4	Winnipeg	5–1	St. Louis		Allen	18,292	0–1–0	0
2	October 6	Chicago	5–4	St. Louis	OT	Allen	17,429	0–1–1	1
3	October 11	Calgary	3–5	St. Louis		Allen	16,403	1–1–1	3
4	October 13	St. Louis	3–4	Chicago	OT	Allen	21,634	1–1–2	4
5	October 14	Anaheim	3–2	St. Louis		Johnson	16,562	1–2–2	4
6	October 17	St. Louis	2–3	Montreal		Allen	20,137	1–3–2	4
7	October 20	St. Louis	4–1	Toronto		Allen	19,268	2–3–2	6
8	October 22	St. Louis	4–5	Winnipeg	OT	Allen	15,321	2–3–3	7
9	October 25	Columbus	7–4	St. Louis		Johnson	17,068	2–4–3	7
10	October 27	Chicago	3–7	St. Louis		Allen	17,201	3–4–3	9

November: 6–8–0 (Home: 4–4–0; Road: 2–4–0)
#	Date	Visitor	Score	Home	OT	Decision	Attendance	Record	Pts	Recap
11	November 1	Vegas	3–5	St. Louis		Allen	16,813	4–4–3	11
12	November 3	Minnesota	5–1	St. Louis		Allen	17,767	4–5–3	11
13	November 6	Carolina	1–4	St. Louis		Johnson	16,210	5–5–3	13
14	November 9	San Jose	0–4	St. Louis		Johnson	17,032	6–5–3	15
15	November 11	Minnesota	3–2	St. Louis		Johnson	16,735	6–6–3	15
16	November 14	St. Louis	0–1	Chicago		Allen	21,401	6–7–3	15
17	November 16	St. Louis	4–1	Vegas		Allen	18,488	7–7–3	17
18	November 17	St. Louis	0–4	San Jose		Johnson	17,417	7–8–3	17
19	November 19	Los Angeles	2–0	St. Louis		Allen	16,860	7–9–3	17
20	November 21	St. Louis	1–4	Nashville		Allen	17,558	7–10–3	17
21	November 23	Nashville	2–6	St. Louis		Allen	16,192	8–10–3	19
22	November 24	Winnipeg	8–4	St. Louis		Johnson	17,028	8–11–3	19
23	November 28	St. Louis	3–4	Detroit		Allen	18,165	8–12–3	19
24	November 30	St. Louis	3–2	Colorado	OT	Allen	18,021	9–12–3	21

December: 6–6–1 (Home: 3–4–1; Road: 3–2–0)
#	Date	Visitor	Score	Home	OT	Decision	Attendance	Record	Pts	Recap
25	December 1	St. Louis	1–6	Arizona		Johnson	13,451	9–13–3	21
26	December 5	Edmonton	3–2	St. Louis	SO	Allen	16,551	9–13–4	22
27	December 7	St. Louis	1–0	Winnipeg		Allen	15,321	10–13–4	24
28	December 9	Vancouver	6–1	St. Louis		Allen	16,841	10–14–4	24
29	December 11	Florida	3–4	St. Louis		Allen	16,255	11–14–4	26
30	December 14	Colorado	3–4	St. Louis	OT	Allen	16,366	12–14–4	28
31	December 16	Calgary	7–2	St. Louis		Allen	17,604	12–15–4	28
32	December 18	St. Louis	4–1	Edmonton		Allen	18,347	13–15–4	30
33	December 20	St. Louis	1–5	Vancouver		Allen	18,261	13–16–4	30
34	December 22	St. Louis	3–1	Calgary		Allen	18,683	14–16–4	32
35	December 27	Buffalo	1–4	St. Louis		Allen	17,867	15–16–4	34
36	December 29	Pittsburgh	6–1	St. Louis		Allen	17,475	15–17–4	34
37	December 31	NY Rangers	2–1	St. Louis		Allen	16,849	15–18–4	34

January: 7–4–1 (Home: 3–2–0; Road: 4–2–1)
#	Date	Visitor	Score	Home	OT	Decision	Attendance	Record	Pts	Recap
38	January 3	Washington	2–5	St. Louis		Allen	17,200	16–18–4	36
39	January 5	NY Islanders	4–3	St. Louis		Allen	16,801	16–19–4	36
40	January 7	St. Louis	3–0	Philadelphia		Binnington	19,021	17–19–4	38
41	January 8	Dallas	3–1	St. Louis		Allen	17,037	17–20–4	38
42	January 10	Montreal	1–4	St. Louis		Binnington	17,839	18–20–4	40
43	January 12	St. Louis	3–1	Dallas		Binnington	18,124	19–20–4	42
44	January 14	St. Louis	4–1	Washington		Allen	18,506	20–20–4	44
45	January 15	St. Louis	1–2	NY Islanders	OT	Binnington	10,042	20–20–5	45
46	January 17	St. Louis	2–5	Boston		Allen	17,565	20–21–5	45
47	January 19	Ottawa	2–3	St. Louis		Binnington	17,690	21–21–5	47
48	January 21	St. Louis	3–4	Los Angeles		Binnington	18,230	21–22–5	47
49	January 23	St. Louis	5–1	Anaheim		Binnington	16,795	22–22–5	49

February: 12–1–1 (Home: 5–0–0; Road: 7–1–1)
#	Date	Visitor	Score	Home	OT	Decision	Attendance	Record	Pts	Recap
50	February 2	St. Louis	4–2	Columbus		Binnington	18,681	23–22–5	51
51	February 5	St. Louis	3–2	Florida		Binnington	10,243	24–22–5	53
52	February 7	St. Louis	1–0	Tampa Bay	OT	Binnington	19,092	25–22–5	55
53	February 9	Nashville	2–3	St. Louis		Binnington	18,166	26–22–5	57
54	February 10	St. Louis	5–4	Nashville	OT	Allen	17,622	27–22–5	59
55	February 12	New Jersey	3–8	St. Louis		Binnington	17,509	28–22–5	61
56	February 14	St. Louis	4–0	Arizona		Binnington	12,533	29–22–5	63
57	February 16	St. Louis	3–0	Colorado		Allen	18,076	30–22–5	65
58	February 17	St. Louis	4–0	Minnesota		Binnington	19,102	31–22–5	67
59	February 19	Toronto	2–3	St. Louis	OT	Binnington	18,598	32–22–5	69
60	February 21	St. Louis	2–5	Dallas		Binnington	17,945	32–23–5	69
61	February 23	Boston	1–2	St. Louis	SO	Binnington	18,425	33–23–5	71
62	February 24	St. Louis	1–2	Minnesota	OT	Allen	18,645	33–23–6	72
63	February 26	Nashville	0–2	St. Louis		Binnington	16,645	34–23–6	74

March: 8–5–2 (Home: 4–2–0; Road: 4–3–2)
#	Date	Visitor	Score	Home	OT	Decision	Attendance	Record	Pts	Recap
64	March 1	St. Louis	2–5	Carolina		Allen	15,363	34–24–6	74
65	March 2	Dallas	4–1	St. Louis		Binnington	18,166	34–25–6	74
66	March 6	St. Louis	5–4	Anaheim		Binnington	16,854	35–25–6	76
67	March 7	St. Louis	4–0	Los Angeles		Allen	17,837	36–25–6	78
68	March 9	St. Louis	2–3	San Jose	OT	Allen	17,562	36–25–7	79
69	March 12	Arizona	3–1	St. Louis		Binnington	18,428	36–26–7	79
70	March 14	St. Louis	0–2	Ottawa		Allen	13,378	36–27–7	79
71	March 16	St. Louis	5–1	Pittsburgh		Binnington	18,641	37–27–7	81
72	March 17	St. Louis	3–4	Buffalo	SO	Allen	18,486	37–27–8	82
73	March 19	Edmonton	2–7	St. Louis		Binnington	17,873	38–27–8	84
74	March 21	Detroit	2–5	St. Louis		Binnington	18,272	39–27–8	86
75	March 23	Tampa Bay	3–4	St. Louis		Binnington	18,127	40–27–8	88
76	March 25	Vegas	1–3	St. Louis		Binnington	18,247	41–27–8	90
77	March 29	St. Louis	2–4	NY Rangers		Binnington	17,567	41–28–8	90
78	March 30	St. Louis	3–2	New Jersey	OT	Allen	16,514	42–28–8	92

April: 3–0–1 (Home: 3–0–0; Road: 0–0–1)
#	Date	Visitor	Score	Home	OT	Decision	Attendance	Record	Pts	Recap
79	April 1	Colorado	2–3	St. Louis	SO	Binnington	17,767	43–28–8	94
80	April 3	St. Louis	3–4	Chicago	SO	Allen	21,482	43–28–9	95
81	April 4	Philadelphia	3–7	St. Louis		Binnington	18,203	44–28–9	97
82	April 6	Vancouver	2–3	St. Louis	SO	Binnington	17,970	45–28–9	99

Legend: Win (2 points) Loss (0 points) Overtime/shootout loss (1 point)

=== Playoffs ===
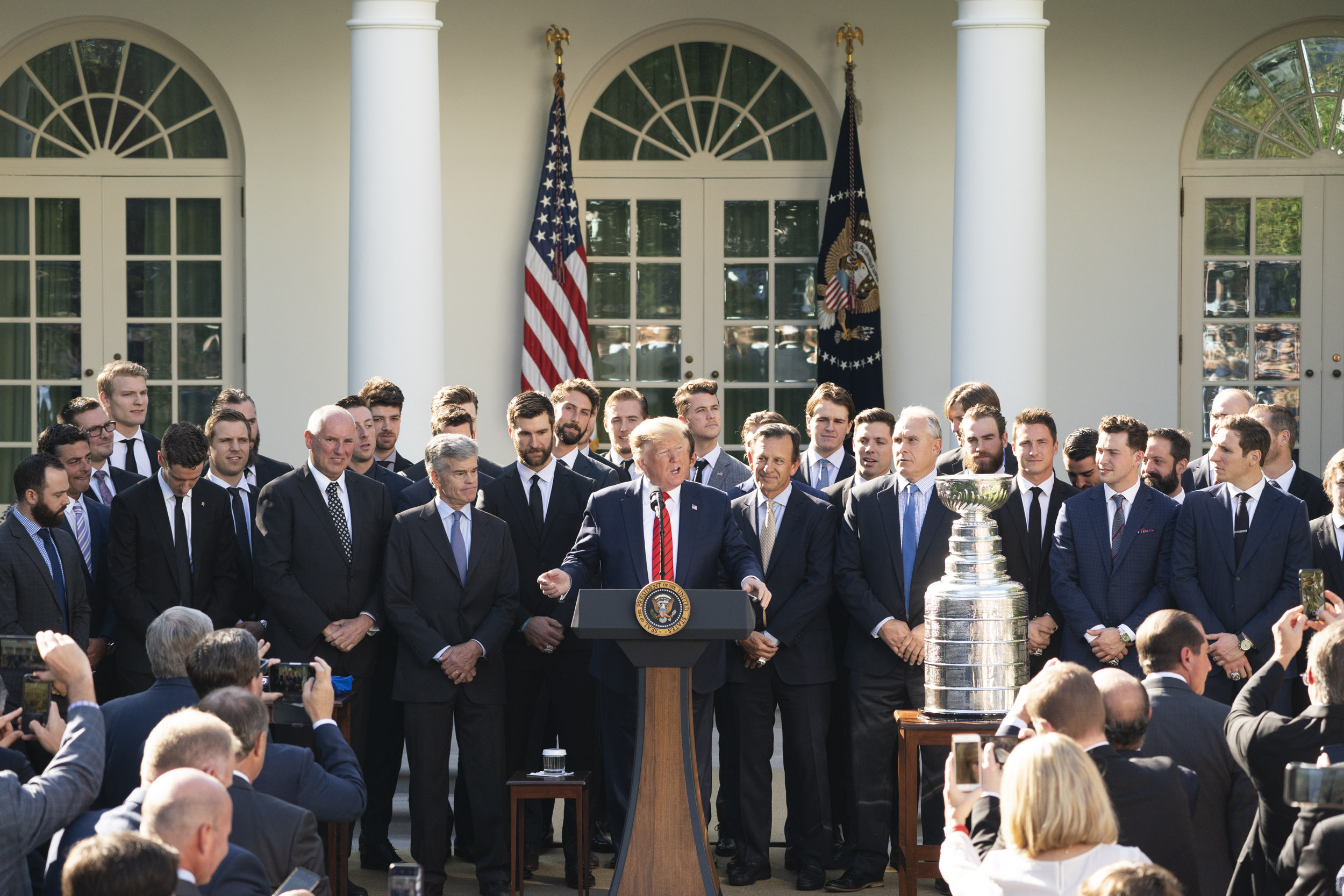
The 2019 Stanley Cup Champions, the St. Louis Blues, at the White House in Oct 2019.

The Blues faced the Winnipeg Jets in the First Round of the playoffs and defeated them in six games. Next up, they faced the Dallas Stars in the Second Round of the playoffs, defeating them in seven games in double overtime. Then, they faced the San Jose Sharks in the Conference Finals of the playoffs, defeating them in six games.

Finally, they faced the Boston Bruins in the Stanley Cup Finals, defeating them in seven games to win their first Stanley Cup.

2019 Stanley Cup playoffs

Western Conference First Round vs. (C2) Winnipeg Jets: St. Louis won 4–2
#	Date	Visitor	Score	Home	OT	Decision	Attendance	Series	Recap
1	April 10	St. Louis	2–1	Winnipeg		Binnington	15,321	1–0
2	April 12	St. Louis	4–3	Winnipeg		Binnington	15,321	2–0
3	April 14	Winnipeg	6–3	St. Louis		Binnington	18,486	2–1
4	April 16	Winnipeg	2–1	St. Louis	OT	Binnington	18,346	2–2
5	April 18	St. Louis	3–2	Winnipeg		Binnington	15,321	3–2
6	April 20	Winnipeg	2–3	St. Louis		Binnington	18,524	4–2

Western Conference Second Round vs. (WC1) Dallas Stars: St. Louis won 4–3
#	Date	Visitor	Score	Home	OT	Decision	Attendance	Series	Recap
1	April 25	Dallas	2–3	St. Louis		Binnington	18,014	1–0
2	April 27	Dallas	4–2	St. Louis		Binnington	18,285	1–1
3	April 29	St. Louis	4–3	Dallas		Binnington	18,532	2–1
4	May 1	St. Louis	2–4	Dallas		Binnington	18,790	2–2
5	May 3	Dallas	2–1	St. Louis		Binnington	18,542	2–3
6	May 5	St. Louis	4–1	Dallas		Binnington	18,876	3–3
7	May 7	Dallas	1–2	St. Louis	2OT	Binnington	18,531	4–3

Western Conference Finals vs. (P2) San Jose Sharks: St. Louis won 4–2
#	Date	Visitor	Score	Home	OT	Decision	Attendance	Series	Recap
1	May 11	St. Louis	3–6	San Jose		Binnington	17,562	0–1
2	May 13	St. Louis	4–2	San Jose		Binnington	17,562	1–1
3	May 15	San Jose	5–4	St. Louis	OT	Binnington	18,360	1–2
4	May 17	San Jose	1–2	St. Louis		Binnington	18,496	2–2
5	May 19	St. Louis	5–0	San Jose		Binnington	17,562	3–2
6	May 21	San Jose	1–5	St. Louis		Binnington	18,684	4–2

Stanley Cup Finals vs. (A2) Boston Bruins: St. Louis won 4–3
#	Date	Visitor	Score	Home	OT	Decision	Attendance	Series	Recap
1	May 27	St. Louis	2–4	Boston		Binnington	17,565	0–1
2	May 29	St. Louis	3–2	Boston	OT	Binnington	17,565	1–1
3	June 1	Boston	7–2	St. Louis		Binnington	18,789	1–2
4	June 3	Boston	2–4	St. Louis		Binnington	18,805	2–2
5	June 6	St. Louis	2–1	Boston		Binnington	17,565	3–2
6	June 9	Boston	5–1	St. Louis		Binnington	18,890	3–3
7	June 12	St. Louis	4–1	Boston		Binnington	17,565	4–3

Legend: Win Loss

== Player statistics ==
As of June 12, 2019

=== Skaters ===
Regular season
Player	GP	G	A	Pts	+/−	PIM
Ryan O'Reilly	82	28	49	77	22	12
Vladimir Tarasenko	76	33	35	68	8	22
Brayden Schenn	72	17	37	54	3	40
David Perron	57	23	23	46	3	46
Alex Pietrangelo	71	13	28	41	2	22
Tyler Bozak	72	13	25	38	–3	20
Jaden Schwartz	69	11	25	36	–6	16
Vince Dunn	78	12	23	35	14	45
Robert Thomas	70	9	24	33	–2	14
Oskar Sundqvist	74	14	17	31	–1	22
Colton Parayko	80	10	18	28	20	15
Patrick Maroon	74	10	18	28	–3	64
Alexander Steen	65	10	17	27	2	14
Ivan Barbashev	80	14	12	26	–4	17
Zach Sanford	60	8	12	20	8	21
Jay Bouwmeester	78	3	14	17	–3	40
Joel Edmundson	64	2	9	11	8	68
Robert Bortuzzo	59	2	8	10	9	47
Carl Gunnarsson	25	3	4	7	8	6
Robby Fabbri	32	2	4	6	–4	6
Mackenzie MacEachern	29	3	2	5	0	10
Samuel Blais	32	2	2	4	–1	6
Jordan Kyrou	16	1	2	3	–1	4
Michael Del Zotto^{†}	7	0	3	3	–2	0
Chris Butler	13	1	1	2	3	0
Jordan Schmaltz	20	0	2	2	–7	2
Jordan Nolan	14	0	2	2	2	14
Nikita Soshnikov	5	0	0	0	–1	0
Jakub Jerabek	1	0	0	0	–3	2
Chris Thorburn	1	0	0	0	0	0

Playoffs
Player	GP	G	A	Pts	+/−	PIM
Ryan O'Reilly	26	8	15	23	2	4
Jaden Schwartz	26	12	8	20	9	2
Alex Pietrangelo	26	3	16	19	5	12
Vladimir Tarasenko	26	11	6	17	–5	4
David Perron	26	7	9	16	4	16
Tyler Bozak	26	5	8	13	–2	8
Brayden Schenn	26	5	7	12	–2	14
Colton Parayko	26	2	10	12	6	10
Oskar Sundqvist	25	4	5	9	5	8
Vince Dunn	20	2	6	8	–5	8
Patrick Maroon	26	3	4	7	–3	8
Joel Edmundson	22	1	6	7	–2	10
Jay Bouwmeester	26	0	7	7	9	18
Ivan Barbashev	25	3	3	6	0	4
Robert Thomas	21	1	5	6	–2	10
Alexander Steen	26	2	3	5	2	2
Zach Sanford	8	1	3	4	4	0
Carl Gunnarsson	19	1	2	3	6	4
Samuel Blais	15	1	2	3	3	10
Robert Bortuzzo	17	2	0	2	3	30
Robby Fabbri	10	1	0	1	–4	0

=== Goaltenders ===
Regular season
Player	GP	GS	TOI	W	L	OT	GA	GAA	SA	SV%	SO	G	A	PIM
Jordan Binnington	32	30	1,876:25	24	5	1	59	1.89	807	.927	5	0	0	0
Jake Allen	46	45	2,567:57	19	17	8	121	2.83	1,277	.905	3	0	0	0
Chad Johnson ^{‡}	10	7	491	2	6	0	29	3.55	250	.884	1	0	0	0

Playoffs
Player	GP	GS	TOI	W	L	GA	GAA	SA	SV%	SO	G	A	PIM
Jordan Binnington	26	26	1,559:30	16	10	64	2.46	742	.914	1	0	1	4
Jake Allen	1	0	24:28	0	0	1	2.45	4	.750	0	0	0	0

^{†}Denotes player spent time with another team before joining the Blues. Stats reflect time with the Blues only.
^{‡}Denotes player was traded mid-season. Stats reflect time with the Blues only.
Bold/italics denotes franchise record.

== Transactions ==
The Blues were involved in the following transactions during the 2018–19 season.

=== Trades ===
Date	Details		Ref
June 22, 2018	To Toronto Maple Leafs WPG's 1st-round pick in 2018; 3rd-round pick in 2018	To St. Louis Blues 1st-round pick in 2018	
July 1, 2018	To Buffalo Sabres Patrik Berglund; Vladimir Sobotka; Tage Thompson; 1st-round pick in 2019; 2nd-round pick in 2021	To St. Louis Blues Ryan O'Reilly	
October 1, 2018	To Edmonton Oilers Conditional 6th-round pick in 2020	To St. Louis Blues Jakub Jerabek	
January 3, 2019	To Anaheim Ducks Future considerations	To St. Louis Blues Jared Coreau	
February 25, 2019	To Anaheim Ducks 6th-round pick in 2019	To St. Louis Blues Michael Del Zotto	

=== Free agents ===
Date	Player	Team	Contract term	Ref
July 1, 2018	Tyler Bozak	from Toronto Maple Leafs	3-year	
July 1, 2018	Kyle Brodziak	to Edmonton Oilers	2-year	
July 1, 2018	Brian Flynn	from Dallas Stars	1-year	
July 1, 2018	Carter Hutton	to Buffalo Sabres	3-year	
July 1, 2018	Chad Johnson	from Buffalo Sabres	1-year	
July 1, 2018	Wade Megan	to Detroit Red Wings	1-year	
July 1, 2018	David Perron	from Vegas Golden Knights	4-year	
July 1, 2018	Tyler Wotherspoon	from Calgary Flames	1-year	
July 2, 2018	Joey LaLeggia	from Edmonton Oilers	2-year	
July 5, 2018	Jordan Nolan	from Buffalo Sabres	1-year	
July 6, 2018	Beau Bennett	to Dinamo Minsk (KHL)	Unknown	
July 10, 2018	Patrick Maroon	from New Jersey Devils	1-year	
July 27, 2018	Petteri Lindbohm	to Lausanne (NL)	1-year	
May 4, 2019	Jakub Jerabek	to Vityaz Podolsk (KHL)	1-year	
June 3, 2019	Nikita Soshnikov	to Salavat Yulaev Ufa (KHL)	2-year	

=== Waivers ===
Date	Player	Team	Ref
October 2, 2018	Dmitrij Jaskin	to Washington Capitals	
December 11, 2018	Chad Johnson	to Anaheim Ducks	

=== Contract terminations ===
Date	Player	Via	Ref
September 16, 2018	Dmitri Sergeev	Mutual termination	
January 19, 2019	Brian Flynn	Mutual termination	

=== Retirement ===
Date	Player	Ref

=== Signings ===
Date	Player	Contract term	Ref
June 24, 2018	Nikita Soshnikov	1-year	
July 3, 2018	Robby Fabbri	1-year	
July 3, 2018	Mackenzie MacEachern	1-year	
July 6, 2018	Jordan Binnington	1-year	
July 6, 2018	Oskar Sundqvist	1-year	
July 7, 2018	Dmitrij Jaskin	1-year	
July 11, 2018	Dominik Bokk	3-year	
July 24, 2018	Joel Edmundson	1-year	
September 13, 2018	Jordan Schmaltz	2-year	
December 13, 2018	Alexey Toropchenko	3-year	
February 9, 2019	Mackenzie MacEachern	1-year	
March 21, 2019	Joel Hofer	3-year	
April 8, 2019	Jay Bouwmeester	1-year	

== Draft picks ==
Below are the St. Louis Blues' selections at the 2018 NHL entry draft, which was held on June 22 and 23, 2018, at the American Airlines Center in Dallas, Texas.

Round	#	Player	Pos	Nationality	College/Junior/Club team (League)
1	25^{1}	Dominik Bokk	LW	Germany	Växjö Lakers (SHL)
2	45	Scott Perunovich	D	United States	Minnesota-Duluth (NCHC)
4	107	Joel Hofer	G	Canada	Swift Current Broncos (WHL)
5	138	Hugh McGing	LW	United States	Western Michigan (NCHC)
6	169	Mathias Laferriere	RW	Canada	Cape Breton Screaming Eagles (QMJHL)
7	200	Tyler Tucker	D	Canada	Barrie Colts (OHL)

Notes:

1. The Toronto Maple Leafs' first-round pick went to the St. Louis Blues as the result of a trade on June 22, 2018, that sent Winnipeg's first-round pick in 2018 (29th overall) to Toronto in exchange for a third-round pick in 2018 (76th overall) and this pick.
