= 2018–19 Montreal Canadiens season =

NHL hockey team season

2018–19 Montreal Canadiens
- Division: 4th Atlantic
- Conference: 9th Eastern
- 2018–19 record: 44–30–8
- Home record: 25–12–4
- Road record: 19–18–4
- Goals for: 249
- Goals against: 236

Team information
- General manager: Marc Bergevin
- Coach: Claude Julien
- Captain: Shea Weber
- Alternate captains: Paul Byron; Brendan Gallagher
- Arena: Bell Centre
- Average attendance: 21,046
- Minor league affiliate: Laval Rocket (AHL)

Team leaders
- Goals: Brendan Gallagher (33)
- Assists: Max Domi (44)
- Points: Max Domi (72)
- Penalty minutes: Max Domi (80)
- Plus/minus: Tomas Tatar (+21)
- Wins: Carey Price (35)
- Goals against average: Carey Price (2.49)

The 2018–19 Montreal Canadiens season was the 110th season for the franchise that was founded on December 4, 1909, and their 102nd in the National Hockey League (NHL). Despite a strong effort, the Canadiens failed to qualify for the playoffs as they missed the cut by just two points, marking the first time that the team missed back-to-back postseasons since the 1999–00 season and the 2000–01 season. Finishing the season with 96 points, the Canadiens also tied the record for most points by a non-qualifying NHL team, joining the 2014–15 Boston Bruins, the 2017–18 Florida Panthers, and eventually the 2024–25 Calgary Flames.

== Standings ==
Atlantic Division
Pos	Team	GP	W	L	OTL	ROW	GF	GA	GD	Pts
1	p – Tampa Bay Lightning	82	62	16	4	56	325	222	+103	128
2	x – Boston Bruins	82	49	24	9	47	259	215	+44	107
3	x – Toronto Maple Leafs	82	46	28	8	46	286	251	+35	100
4	Montreal Canadiens	82	44	30	8	41	249	236	+13	96
5	Florida Panthers	82	36	32	14	33	267	280	−13	86
6	Buffalo Sabres	82	33	39	10	28	226	271	−45	76
7	Detroit Red Wings	82	32	40	10	29	227	277	−50	74
8	Ottawa Senators	82	29	47	6	29	242	302	−60	64

Source: National Hockey League
p – Clinched Presidents' Trophy; x – Clinched playoff spot

Eastern Conference Wild Card
Pos	Div	Team	GP	W	L	OTL	ROW	GF	GA	GD	Pts
1	ME	x – Carolina Hurricanes	82	46	29	7	44	245	223	+22	99
2	ME	x – Columbus Blue Jackets	82	47	31	4	45	258	232	+26	98
3	AT	Montreal Canadiens	82	44	30	8	41	249	236	+13	96
4	AT	Florida Panthers	82	36	32	14	33	267	280	−13	86
5	ME	Philadelphia Flyers	82	37	37	8	34	244	281	−37	82
6	ME	New York Rangers	82	32	36	14	26	227	272	−45	78
7	AT	Buffalo Sabres	82	33	39	10	28	226	271	−45	76
8	AT	Detroit Red Wings	82	32	40	10	29	227	277	−50	74
9	ME	New Jersey Devils	82	31	41	10	28	222	275	−53	72
10	AT	Ottawa Senators	82	29	47	6	29	242	302	−60	64

Source: National Hockey League
x – Clinched playoff spot

== Schedule and results ==
=== Preseason ===
The preseason schedule was published on June 18, 2018.

2018 preseason game log: 4–3–0 (Home: 3–2–0; Road: 1–1–0)
#	Date	Visitor	Score	Home	OT	Decision	Attendance	Record	Recap
1	September 17	New Jersey	1–3	Montreal		Lindgren	19,422	1–0–0	Recap
2	September 19	Florida	5–2	Montreal		Niemi	19,691	1–1–0	Recap
3^{[a]}	September 20	Washington	2–5	Montreal		Lindgren	–	2–1–0	Recap
4	September 22	Ottawa	2–3	Montreal		Price	20,405	3–1–0	Recap
5	September 24	Montreal	5–1	Toronto		Niemi	18,843	4–1–0	Recap
6	September 26	Toronto	5–3	Montreal		Price	20,486	4–2–0	Recap
7	September 29	Montreal	0–3	Ottawa		Price	14,398	4–3–0	Recap
Notes:^{a} Game was played at Videotron Centre in Quebec City, Quebec.

=== Regular season ===
The regular season schedule was released on June 21, 2018.

2018–19 game log

October: 6–3–2 (Home: 4–2–0; Road: 2–1–2)
#	Date	Visitor	Score	Home	OT	Decision	Attendance	Record	Pts	Recap
1	October 3	Montreal	2–3	Toronto	OT	Price	19,589	0–0–1	1	Recap
2	October 6	Montreal	5–1	Pittsburgh		Price	18,622	1–0–1	3	Recap
3	October 11	Los Angeles	3–0	Montreal		Price	21,302	1–1–1	3	Recap
4	October 13	Pittsburgh	3–4	Montreal	SO	Niemi	21,302	2–1–1	5	Recap
5	October 15	Detroit	3–7	Montreal		Niemi	20,323	3–1–1	7	Recap
6	October 17	St. Louis	2–3	Montreal		Price	20,137	4–1–1	9	Recap
7	October 20	Montreal	3–4	Ottawa	OT	Price	18,442	4–1–2	10	Recap
8	October 23	Calgary	2–3	Montreal		Price	21,028	5–1–2	12	Recap
9	October 25	Montreal	3–4	Buffalo		Niemi	16,112	5–2–2	12	Recap
10	October 27	Montreal	3–0	Boston		Price	17,565	6–2–2	14	Recap
11	October 30	Dallas	4–1	Montreal		Price	20,506	6–3–2	14	Recap

November: 5–6–3 (Home: 2–3–2; Road: 3–3–1)
#	Date	Visitor	Score	Home	OT	Decision	Attendance	Record	Pts	Recap
12	November 1	Washington	4–6	Montreal		Price	20,279	7–3–2	16	Recap
13	November 3	Tampa Bay	4–1	Montreal		Price	21,302	7–4–2	16	Recap
14	November 5	Montreal	4–3	NY Islanders	SO	Niemi	9,402	8–4–2	18	Recap
15	November 6	Montreal	3–5	NY Rangers		Price	17,428	8–5–2	18	Recap
16	November 8	Buffalo	6–5	Montreal	OT	Price	20,488	8–5–3	19	Recap
17	November 10	Vegas	4–5	Montreal		Niemi	21,302	9–5–3	21	Recap
18	November 13	Montreal	2–6	Edmonton		Niemi	18,347	9–6–3	21	Recap
19	November 15	Montreal	3–2	Calgary		Price	18,443	10–6–3	23	Recap
20	November 17	Montreal	3–2	Vancouver		Price	17,880	11–6–3	25	Recap
21	November 19	Washington	5–4	Montreal	OT	Price	21,911	11–6–4	26	Recap
22	November 21	Montreal	2–5	New Jersey		Price	16,514	11–7–4	26	Recap
23	November 23	Montreal	2–3	Buffalo	OT	Niemi	19,070	11–7–5	27	Recap
24	November 24	Boston	3–2	Montreal		Price	21,302	11–8–5	27	Recap
25	November 27	Carolina	2–1	Montreal		Price	20,835	11–9–5	27	Recap

December: 10–5–0 (Home: 4–2–0; Road: 6–3–0)
#	Date	Visitor	Score	Home	OT	Decision	Attendance	Record	Pts	Recap
26	December 1	NY Rangers	2–5	Montreal		Price	21,302	12–9–5	29	Recap
27	December 2	San Jose	3–1	Montreal		Price	20,301	12–10–5	29	Recap
28	December 4	Ottawa	2–5	Montreal		Price	20,705	13–10–5	31	Recap
29	December 6	Montreal	5–2	Ottawa		Price	15,820	14–10–5	33	Recap
30	December 9	Montreal	3–2	Chicago		Price	21,057	15–10–5	35	Recap
31	December 11	Montreal	1–7	Minnesota		Niemi	18,681	15–11–5	35	Recap
32	December 13	Carolina	4–6	Montreal		Price	20,407	16–11–5	37	Recap
33	December 15	Ottawa	2–5	Montreal		Price	21,302	17–11–5	39	Recap
34	December 17	Boston	4–0	Montreal		Price	21,302	17–12–5	39	Recap
35	December 19	Montreal	1–2	Colorado		Price	15,469	17–13–5	39	Recap
36	December 20	Montreal	2–1	Arizona		Price	11,149	18–13–5	41	Recap
37	December 22	Montreal	4–3	Vegas	OT	Price	18,173	19–13–5	43	Recap
38	December 28	Montreal	5–3	Florida		Niemi	19,512	20–13–5	45	Recap
39	December 29	Montreal	5–6	Tampa Bay		Niemi	19,092	20–14–5	45	Recap
40	December 31	Montreal	3–2	Dallas	OT	Niemi	18,532	21–14–5	47	Recap

January: 7–4–0 (Home: 4–3–0; Road: 3–1–0)
#	Date	Visitor	Score	Home	OT	Decision	Attendance	Record	Pts	Recap
41	January 3	Vancouver	0–2	Montreal		Price	21,302	22–14–5	49	Recap
42	January 5	Nashville	4–1	Montreal		Price	21,302	22–15–5	49	Recap
43	January 7	Minnesota	1–0	Montreal		Price	20,601	22–16–5	49	Recap
44	January 8	Montreal	3–2	Detroit		Niemi	18,098	23–16–5	51	Recap
45	January 10	Montreal	1–4	St. Louis		Price	17,839	23–17–5	51	Recap
46	January 12	Colorado	0–3	Montreal		Price	21,302	24–17–5	53	Recap
47	January 14	Montreal	3–2	Boston	OT	Price	17,565	25–17–5	55	Recap
48	January 15	Florida	1–5	Montreal		Niemi	20,576	26–17–5	57	Recap
49	January 18	Montreal	4–1	Columbus		Price	18,892	27–17–5	59	Recap
50	January 19	Philadelphia	5–2	Montreal		Niemi	21,302	27–18–5	59	Recap
51	January 23	Arizona	1–2	Montreal		Price	21,002	28–18–5	61	Recap

February: 6–5–2 (Home: 5–0–2; Road: 1–5–0)
#	Date	Visitor	Score	Home	OT	Decision	Attendance	Record	Pts	Recap
52	February 2	New Jersey	3–2	Montreal	OT	Niemi	21,302	28–18–6	62	Recap
53	February 3	Edmonton	3–4	Montreal	OT	Price	21,302	29–18–6	64	Recap
54	February 5	Anaheim	1–4	Montreal		Price	20,680	30–18–6	66	Recap
55	February 7	Winnipeg	2–5	Montreal		Price	21,302	31–18–6	68	Recap
56	February 9	Toronto	4–3	Montreal	OT	Price	21,302	31–18–7	69	Recap
57	February 14	Montreal	1–3	Nashville		Price	17,417	31–19–7	69	Recap
58	February 16	Montreal	0–3	Tampa Bay		Price	19,092	31–20–7	69	Recap
59	February 17	Montreal	3–6	Florida		Price	16,212	31–21–7	69	Recap
60	February 19	Columbus	2–3	Montreal		Price	20,858	32–21–7	71	Recap
61	February 21	Philadelphia	1–5	Montreal		Price	21,302	33–21–7	73	Recap
62	February 23	Montreal	3–6	Toronto		Price	19,506	33–22–7	73	Recap
63	February 25	Montreal	1–2	New Jersey		Price	12,791	33–23–7	73	Recap
64	February 26	Montreal	8–1	Detroit		Price	18,845	34–23–7	75	Recap

March: 8–6–1 (Home: 4–2–0; Road: 4–4–1)
#	Date	Visitor	Score	Home	OT	Decision	Attendance	Record	Pts	Recap
65	March 1	Montreal	4–2	NY Rangers		Price	17,334	35–23–7	77	Recap
66	March 2	Pittsburgh	5–1	Montreal		Price	21,302	35–24–7	77	Recap
67	March 5	Montreal	3–1	Los Angeles		Price	17,764	36–24–7	79	Recap
68	March 7	Montreal	2–5	San Jose		Niemi	17,471	36–25–7	79	Recap
69	March 8	Montreal	2–8	Anaheim		Price	16,580	36–26–7	79	Recap
70	March 12	Detroit	1–3	Montreal		Price	21,302	37–26–7	81	Recap
71	March 14	Montreal	1–2	NY Islanders		Price	13,274	37–27–7	81	Recap
72	March 16	Chicago	2–0	Montreal		Price	21,302	37–28–7	81	Recap
73	March 19	Montreal	3–1	Philadelphia		Price	19,045	38–28–7	83	Recap
74	March 21	NY Islanders	0–4	Montreal		Price	21,302	39–28–7	85	Recap
75	March 23	Buffalo	4–7	Montreal		Price	21,302	40–28–7	87	Recap
76	March 24	Montreal	1–2	Carolina	OT	Price	14,437	40–28–8	88	Recap
77	March 26	Florida	1–6	Montreal		Price	21,029	41–28–8	90	Recap
78	March 28	Montreal	2–6	Columbus		Price	18,641	41–29–8	90	Recap
79	March 30	Montreal	3–1	Winnipeg		Price	15,321	42–29–8	92	Recap

April: 2–1–0 (Home: 2–0–0; Road: 0–1–0)
#	Date	Visitor	Score	Home	OT	Decision	Attendance	Record	Pts	Recap
80	April 2	Tampa Bay	2–4	Montreal		Price	21,302	43–29–8	94	Recap
81	April 4	Montreal	1–2	Washington		Price	18,506	43–30–8	94	Recap
82	April 6	Toronto	5–6	Montreal	SO	Lindgren	21,302	44–30–8	96	Recap

Legend: Win (2 points) Loss (0 points) Overtime/shootout loss (1 point)

== Player statistics ==
As of April 6, 2019

=== Skaters ===
Regular season
Player	GP	G	A	Pts	+/−	PIM
Max Domi	82	28	44	72	20	80
Tomas Tatar	80	25	33	58	21	34
Jonathan Drouin	81	18	35	53	−8	26
Phillip Danault	81	12	41	53	17	39
Brendan Gallagher	82	33	19	52	10	49
Andrew Shaw	63	19	28	47	17	71
Jeff Petry	82	13	33	46	−5	28
Jesperi Kotkaniemi	79	11	23	34	1	26
Shea Weber	58	14	19	33	15	28
Paul Byron	56	15	16	31	16	17
Artturi Lehkonen	82	11	20	31	10	32
Joel Armia	57	13	10	23	0	14
Jordie Benn	81	5	17	22	15	39
Brett Kulak	57	6	11	17	12	31
Victor Mete	71	0	13	13	17	6
Mike Reilly	57	3	8	11	0	16
Kenny Agostino^{‡}	36	2	9	11	−1	26
Jordan Weal^{†}	16	4	6	10	0	2
Matthew Peca	39	3	7	10	−14	4
Nate Thompson^{†}	25	1	6	7	−4	0
Charles Hudon	32	3	2	5	−9	16
Nicolas Deslauriers	48	2	3	5	−12	22
Noah Juulsen	21	1	4	5	5	6
Michael Chaput^{‡}	32	0	5	5	−4	14
Christian Folin^{†}	19	0	4	4	1	11
Ryan Poehling	1	3	0	3	3	0
Xavier Ouellet	19	0	3	3	−3	13
David Schlemko^{‡}	18	0	2	2	−1	4
Tomas Plekanec	3	1	0	1	0	0
Karl Alzner	9	0	1	1	1	2
Dale Weise^{†}	9	0	0	0	−2	4

=== Goaltenders ===
Regular season
Player	GP	GS	TOI	W	L	OT	GA	GAA	SA	SV%	SO	G	A	PIM
Carey Price	66	64	3,880:15	35	24	6	161	2.49	1,952	.918	4	0	1	2
Antti Niemi	17	17	968:48	8	6	2	61	3.78	539	.887	0	0	1	0
Charlie Lindgren	1	1	65:00	1	0	0	5	4.62	49	.898	0	0	0	0

^{†}Denotes player spent time with another team before joining the Canadiens. Stats reflect time with the Canadiens only.
^{‡}Denotes player was traded mid-season. Stats reflect time with the Canadiens only.
Bold/italics denotes franchise record.

== Suspensions/fines ==
Player	Explanation	Length	Salary	Date issued	Ref
Max Domi	Roughing Panthers defenceman Aaron Ekblad	5 games (all pre-season)	N/A	September 20, 2018	
Phillip Danault	Dangerous trip against Panthers defenceman Aaron Ekblad	N/A	$5,000.00	December 29, 2018	
Carey Price	Automatic suspension for missing NHL All-Star Game	1 game	N/A	January 7, 2019	
Paul Byron	Charging Panthers defenceman MacKenzie Weegar	3 games	$18,817.20	January 16, 2019	

== Awards and honours ==
=== Awards ===
Regular season
Player	Award	Awarded	Ref
Carey Price	NHL All-Star Game selection	January 2, 2019	

=== Milestones ===
Regular season
Player	Milestone	Reached	Ref
Jesperi Kotkaniemi	1st career NHL game 1st career NHL assist 1st career NHL point	October 3, 2018	
Max Domi	100th career NHL assist	October 3, 2018	
Jonathan Drouin	100th career NHL assist	October 13, 2018	
Tomas Plekanec	1,000th career NHL game	October 17, 2018	
Jordie Benn	400th career NHL game	October 23, 2018	
Jesperi Kotkaniemi	1st career NHL goal	November 1, 2018	
Phillip Danault	200th career NHL game	November 3, 2018	
David Schlemko	400th career NHL game	November 16, 2018	
Andrew Shaw	100th career NHL assist	November 24, 2018	
Andrew Shaw	200th career NHL point	December 2, 2018	
Andrew Shaw	100th career NHL goal	December 6, 2018	
Charles Hudon	100th career NHL game	December 19, 2018	
Carey Price	300th career NHL win	December 20, 2018	
Phillip Danault	1st career NHL hat-trick	December 22, 2018	
Nicolas Deslauriers	300th career NHL game	January 10, 2019	
Joel Armia	200th career NHL game	January 10, 2019	
Jeff Petry	200th career NHL point	January 14, 2019	
Jordie Benn	100th career NHL point	January 15, 2019	
Carey Price	600th career NHL game	February 9, 2019	
Shea Weber	900th career NHL game	February 14, 2019	
Jonathan Drouin	300th career NHL game	February 17, 2019	
Paul Byron	400th career NHL game	February 19, 2019	
Artturi Lehkonen	200th career NHL game	February 21, 2019	
Brendan Gallagher	1st career NHL hat-trick	February 21, 2019	
Victor Mete	100th career NHL game	February 23, 2019	
Andrew Shaw	1st career NHL hat-trick	February 26, 2019	
Joel Armia	1st career NHL hat-trick	March 1, 2019	
Shea Weber	200th career NHL goal	March 8, 2019	
Jeff Petry	600th career NHL game	March 19, 2019	
Max Domi	200th career NHL point	March 23, 2019	
Tomas Tatar	500th career NHL game	March 23, 2019	
Max Domi	300th career NHL game	March 28, 2019	
Andrew Shaw	500th career NHL game	March 28, 2019	
Ryan Poehling	1st career NHL game 1st career NHL goal 1st career NHL point 1st career NHL hat-trick	April 6, 2019	

== Transactions ==
The Canadiens have been involved in the following transactions during the 2018–19 season.

=== Trades ===
Date	Details		Ref
June 23, 2018	To Edmonton Oilers WSH's 2nd-round pick in 2018	To Montreal Canadiens 3rd-round pick in 2018; 5th-round pick in 2018	
June 23, 2018	To San Jose Sharks EDM's 4th-round pick in 2018	To Montreal Canadiens VGK's 4th-round pick in 2018; FLA's 5th-round pick in 2018	
June 23, 2018	To Calgary Flames WPG's 4th-round pick in 2018	To Montreal Canadiens 4th-round pick in 2019	
June 23, 2018	To Chicago Blackhawks FLA's 5th-round pick in 2018	To Montreal Canadiens 5th-round pick in 2019	
June 23, 2018	To Philadelphia Flyers 7th-round pick in 2019	To Montreal Canadiens MTL's 7th-round pick in 2018	
June 23, 2018	To Edmonton Oilers Hayden Hawkey	To Montreal Canadiens 5th-round pick in 2019	
June 30, 2018	To Winnipeg Jets Simon Bourque	To Montreal Canadiens Joel Armia; Steve Mason; 7th-round pick in 2019; 4th-round pick in 2020	
August 20, 2018	To Calgary Flames Kerby Rychel	To Montreal Canadiens Hunter Shinkaruk	
September 10, 2018	To Vegas Golden Knights Max Pacioretty	To Montreal Canadiens Tomas Tatar; Nick Suzuki; 2nd-round pick in 2019	
October 1, 2018	To Calgary Flames Matt Taormina; Rinat Valiev	To Montreal Canadiens Brett Kulak	
October 3, 2018	To Minnesota Wild William Bitten	To Montreal Canadiens Gustav Olofsson	
February 9, 2019	To Philadelphia Flyers Byron Froese; David Schlemko	To Montreal Canadiens Christian Folin; Dale Weise	
February 11, 2019	To Los Angeles Kings CGY's 4th-round pick in 2019	To Montreal Canadiens Nate Thompson; ARI's 5th-round pick in 2019	
February 25, 2019	To Arizona Coyotes Michael Chaput	To Montreal Canadiens Jordan Weal	

=== Free agents ===
Date	Player	Team	Contract term	Ref
July 1, 2018	Kenny Agostino	from Boston Bruins	1-year	
July 1, 2018	Daniel Carr	to Vegas Golden Knights	1-year	
July 1, 2018	Michael Chaput	from Chicago Blackhawks	2-year	
July 1, 2018	Adam Cracknell	to Toronto Maple Leafs	1-year	
July 1, 2018	Zachary Fucale	to Vegas Golden Knights	1-year	
July 1, 2018	Xavier Ouellet	from Detroit Red Wings	1-year	
July 1, 2018	Matthew Peca	from Tampa Bay Lightning	2-year	
July 1, 2018	Tomas Plekanec	from Toronto Maple Leafs	1-year	
July 1, 2018	Chris Terry	to Detroit Red Wings	2-year	
July 3, 2018	Jeremy Gregoire	to Milwaukee Admirals (AHL)	1-year	
August 21, 2018	Tom Parisi	to Cardiff Devils (EIHL)	1-year	
September 21, 2018	Joel Teasdale	from Blainville-Boisbriand Armada (QMJHL)	3-year	
October 10, 2018	Logan Shaw	to San Diego Gulls (AHL)	1-year	
May 7, 2019	Otto Leskinen	from KalPa (Liiga)	2-year	
May 24, 2019	Alex Belzile	from Laval Rocket (AHL)	1-year	
June 5, 2019	Antti Niemi	to Jokerit (KHL)	1-year	

=== Waivers ===
Date	Player	Team	Ref
October 17, 2018	Jacob de la Rose	to Detroit Red Wings	
December 2, 2018	Nikita Scherbak	to Los Angeles Kings	
February 11, 2019	Kenny Agostino	to New Jersey Devils	

=== Contract terminations ===
Date	Player	Via	Ref
June 30, 2018	Steve Mason	Buyout	
November 3, 2018	Jeremiah Addison	Mutual termination	
November 11, 2018	Tomas Plekanec	Mutual termination	
January 29, 2019	Michal Moravcik	Mutual termination	

=== Retirement ===
Date	Player	Ref
November 11, 2018	Tomas Plekanec	

=== Signings ===
Date	Player	Contract term	Ref
July 1, 2018	Jesperi Kotkaniemi	3-year	
July 5, 2018	Jacob de la Rose	2-year	
July 13, 2018	Joel Armia	1-year	
July 15, 2018	Phillip Danault	3-year	
August 20, 2018	Hunter Shinkaruk	1-year	
September 10, 2018	Michael McCarron	1-year	
September 21, 2018	Josh Brook	3-year	
September 23, 2018	Paul Byron	4-year	
October 4, 2018	Cale Fleury	3-year	
March 31, 2019	Ryan Poehling	3-year	
March 31, 2019	Cayden Primeau	3-year	
April 18, 2019	Christian Folin	1-year	
April 25, 2019	Nate Thompson	1-year	
April 26, 2019	Jordan Weal	2-year	
May 24, 2019	Brett Kulak	3-year	
May 27, 2019	Xavier Ouellet	1-year	
June 14, 2019	Gustav Olofsson	1-year	

== Draft picks ==
Below are the Montreal Canadiens' selections at the 2018 NHL entry draft, which was held on June 22 and 23, 2018, at the American Airlines Center in Dallas, Texas.

Round	#	Player	Pos	Nationality	College/Junior/Club team (League)
1	3	Jesperi Kotkaniemi	C	Finland	Assat (Liiga)
2	35	Jesse Ylonen	RW	Finland	Espoo United (Mestis)
2	38^{1}	Alexander Romanov	D	Russia	Krasnaya Armiya (MHL)
2	56^{2}	Jacob Olofsson	C	Sweden	Timra IK (Allsvenskan)
3	66	Cameron Hillis	C	Canada	Guelph Storm (OHL)
3	71^{3}	Jordan Harris	D	United States	Kimball Union Academy (USHS)
4	97^{4}	Allan McShane	C	Canada	Oshawa Generals (OHL)
4	123^{5}	Jack Gorniak	RW	United States	West Salem High School (USHS)
5	128	Cole Fonstad	C	Canada	Prince Albert Raiders (WHL)
5	133^{6}	Samuel Houde	C	Canada	Chicoutimi Sagueneens (QMJHL)
7	190^{7}	Brett Stapley	C	Canada	Vernon Vipers (BCHL)

=== Notes ===
1. The Chicago Blackhawks' second-round pick went to the Montreal Canadiens as the result of a trade on February 26, 2016, that sent Tomas Fleischmann and Dale Weise to Chicago in exchange for Phillip Danault and this pick.
2. The Toronto Maple Leafs' second-round pick went to the Montreal Canadiens as the result of a trade on February 25, 2018, that sent Tomas Plekanec and Kyle Baun to Toronto in exchange for Kerby Rychel, Rinat Valiev and this pick.
3. The Edmonton Oilers' third-round pick went to the Montreal Canadiens as the result of a trade on June 23, 2018, that sent Washington's second-round pick in 2018 (62nd overall) to Edmonton in exchange for a fifth-round pick in 2018 (133rd overall) and this pick.
4. The Montreal Canadiens' fourth-round pick was re-acquired as the result of a trade on November 23, 2017, that sent Torrey Mitchell to the Los Angeles Kings in exchange for this pick (being conditional at the time of the trade). The condition – Montreal would receive their original fourth-round pick in 2018 should the Kings qualify for the 2018 Stanley Cup playoffs – was converted on April 4, 2018 following the Chicago Blackhawks 4-3 victory versus the St. Louis Blues which clinched Los Angeles a wild card berth.
5. The Vegas Golden Knights' fourth-round pick went to the Montreal Canadiens as the result of a trade on June 23, 2018, that sent Edmonton's fourth-round pick in 2018 (102nd overall) to San Jose in exchange for Florida's fifth-round pick in 2018 (139th overall) and this pick.
6. The Edmonton Oilers' fifth-round pick went to the Montreal Canadiens as the result of a trade on June 23, 2018, that sent Washington's second-round pick in 2018 (62nd overall) to Edmonton in exchange for a third-round pick in 2018 (71st overall) and this pick.
7. The Montreal Canadiens' seventh-round pick was re-acquired as the result of a trade on June 23, 2018, that sent a seventh-round pick in 2019 to Philadelphia in exchange for this pick.
