= 2018–19 Los Angeles Kings season =

Season of play of professional ice hockey team

2018–19 Los Angeles Kings
- Division: 8th Pacific
- Conference: 15th Western
- 2018–19 record: 31–42–9
- Home record: 17–21–3
- Road record: 14–21–6
- Goals for: 202
- Goals against: 263

Team information
- General manager: Rob Blake
- Coach: John Stevens (Oct. 5 – Nov. 4); Willie Desjardins (Nov. 4 – Apr. 6)
- Captain: Anze Kopitar
- Alternate captains: Jeff Carter; Drew Doughty
- Arena: Staples Center
- Average attendance: 18,000
- Minor league affiliates: Ontario Reign (AHL); Manchester Monarchs (ECHL)

Team leaders
- Goals: Dustin Brown; Anze Kopitar (22)
- Assists: Anze Kopitar (38)
- Points: Anze Kopitar (60)
- Penalty minutes: Kyle Clifford (96)
- Plus/minus: Jake Muzzin (+10)
- Wins: Jonathan Quick (16)
- Goals against average: Jack Campbell (2.30)

The 2018–19 Los Angeles Kings season was the 52nd season (51st season of play) for the National Hockey League (NHL) franchise that was established on June 5, 1967. On March 18, 2019, the Kings were eliminated from playoff contention, and missed the playoffs for the third time in five seasons.

== Standings ==
Pacific Division
Pos	Team	GP	W	L	OTL	ROW	GF	GA	GD	Pts
1	z – Calgary Flames	82	50	25	7	50	289	227	+62	107
2	x – San Jose Sharks	82	46	27	9	46	289	261	+28	101
3	x – Vegas Golden Knights	82	43	32	7	40	249	230	+19	93
4	Arizona Coyotes	82	39	35	8	35	213	223	−10	86
5	Vancouver Canucks	82	35	36	11	29	225	254	−29	81
6	Anaheim Ducks	82	35	37	10	32	199	251	−52	80
7	Edmonton Oilers	82	35	38	9	32	232	274	−42	79
8	Los Angeles Kings	82	31	42	9	28	202	263	−61	71

Source: National Hockey League
x – Clinched playoff spot; z – Clinched conference

Western Conference Wild Card
Pos	Div	Team	GP	W	L	OTL	ROW	GF	GA	GD	Pts
1	CE	x – Dallas Stars	82	43	32	7	42	210	202	+8	93
2	CE	x – Colorado Avalanche	82	38	30	14	36	260	246	+14	90
3	PA	Arizona Coyotes	82	39	35	8	35	213	223	−10	86
4	CE	Chicago Blackhawks	82	36	34	12	33	270	292	−22	84
5	CE	Minnesota Wild	82	37	36	9	36	211	237	−26	83
6	PA	Vancouver Canucks	82	35	36	11	29	225	254	−29	81
7	PA	Anaheim Ducks	82	35	37	10	32	199	251	−52	80
8	PA	Edmonton Oilers	82	35	38	9	32	232	274	−42	79
9	PA	Los Angeles Kings	82	31	42	9	28	202	263	−61	71

Source: National Hockey League
x – Clinched playoff spot

== Schedule and results ==
=== Preseason ===
The preseason schedule was published on June 20, 2018.

2018 preseason game log: 1–6–1 (Home: 1–3–0; Road: 0–3–1)
#	Date	Visitor	Score	Home	OT	Decision	Attendance	Record	Recap
1^{[A]}	September 18	Los Angeles	2–4	Arizona		Campbell	9,807	0–1–0	Recap
2^{[A]}	September 18	Arizona	4–3	Los Angeles		Petersen	10,612	0–2–0	Recap
3^{[A]}	September 20	Los Angeles	3–4	Vancouver	SO	Budaj	15,903	0–2–1	Recap
4^{[A]}	September 20	Vegas	7–2	Los Angeles		Quick	12,916	0–3–1	Recap
5^{[a]}	September 24	Vancouver	1–4	Los Angeles		Quick	12,367	1–3–1	Recap
6	September 26	Los Angeles	4–7	Anaheim		Campbell	14,841	1–4–1	Recap
7	September 28	Los Angeles	0–2	Vegas		Campbell	17,928	1–5–1	Recap
8	September 29	Anaheim	3–0	Los Angeles		Quick	18,230	1–6–1	Recap
Notes:^{A} Indicates split-squad.^{a} Game was played at Vivint Smart Home Arena in Salt Lake City, Utah.

=== Regular season ===
The regular season schedule was released on June 21, 2018.

2018–19 game log

October: 3–7–1 (Home: 2–2–1; Road: 1–5–0)
#	Date	Visitor	Score	Home	OT	Decision	Attendance	Record	Pts	Recap
1	October 5	San Jose	3–2	Los Angeles	OT	Quick	18,230	0–0–1	1	Recap
2	October 7	Detroit	2–4	Los Angeles		Campbell	18,230	1–0–1	3	Recap
3	October 9	Los Angeles	1–2	Winnipeg		Campbell	15,321	1–1–1	3	Recap
4	October 11	Los Angeles	3–0	Montreal		Campbell	21,302	2–1–1	5	Recap
5	October 13	Los Angeles	1–5	Ottawa		Campbell	15,355	2–2–1	5	Recap
6	October 15	Los Angeles	1–4	Toronto		Campbell	19,429	2–3–1	5	Recap
7	October 18	NY Islanders	7–2	Los Angeles		Quick	18,230	2–4–1	5	Recap
8	October 20	Buffalo	5–1	Los Angeles		Quick	18,230	2–5–1	5	Recap
9	October 23	Los Angeles	2–4	Dallas		Quick	17,354	2–6–1	5	Recap
10	October 25	Los Angeles	1–4	Minnesota		Campbell	18,778	2–7–1	5	Recap
11	October 28	NY Rangers	3–4	Los Angeles		Campbell	18,230	3–7–1	7	Recap

November: 6–9–0 (Home: 3–6–0; Road: 3–3–0)
#	Date	Visitor	Score	Home	OT	Decision	Attendance	Record	Pts	Recap
12	November 1	Philadelphia	5–2	Los Angeles		Campbell	18,230	3–8–1	7	Recap
13	November 3	Columbus	1–4	Los Angeles		Campbell	18,230	4–8–1	9	Recap
14	November 6	Anaheim	1–4	Los Angeles		Campbell	18,230	5–8–1	11	Recap
15	November 8	Minnesota	3–1	Los Angeles		Campbell	17,621	5–9–1	11	Recap
16	November 10	Calgary	1–0	Los Angeles		Campbell	18,230	5–10–1	11	Recap
17	November 13	Toronto	5–1	Los Angeles		Budaj	17,859	5–11–1	11	Recap
18	November 16	Los Angeles	2–1	Chicago	SO	Petersen	21,227	6–11–1	13	Recap
19	November 17	Los Angeles	3–5	Nashville		Petersen	17,627	6–12–1	13	Recap
20	November 19	Los Angeles	2–0	St. Louis		Petersen	16,860	7–12–1	15	Recap
21	November 21	Colorado	7–3	Los Angeles		Petersen	17,840	7–13–1	15	Recap
22	November 24	Vancouver	4–2	Los Angeles		Petersen	17,725	7–14–1	15	Recap
23	November 25	Edmonton	2–5	Los Angeles		Petersen	17,581	8–14–1	17	Recap
24	November 27	Los Angeles	2–1	Vancouver	OT	Petersen	17,790	9–14–1	19	Recap
25	November 29	Los Angeles	2–3	Edmonton		Quick	18,347	9–15–1	19	Recap
26	November 30	Los Angeles	1–4	Calgary		Petersen	17,989	9–16–1	19	Recap

December: 7–5–2 (Home: 4–3–0; Road: 3–2–2)
#	Date	Visitor	Score	Home	OT	Decision	Attendance	Record	Pts	Recap
27	December 2	Carolina	0–2	Los Angeles		Quick	17,546	10–16–1	21	Recap
28	December 4	Arizona	2–1	Los Angeles		Quick	17,203	10–17–1	21	Recap
29	December 6	New Jersey	6–3	Los Angeles		Quick	17,568	10–18–1	21	Recap
30	December 8	Vegas	1–5	Los Angeles		Quick	17,631	11–18–1	23	Recap
31	December 10	Los Angeles	1–3	Detroit		Quick	18,322	11–19–1	23	Recap
32	December 11	Los Angeles	3–4	Buffalo	OT	Petersen	17,897	11–19–2	24	Recap
33	December 13	Los Angeles	1–4	Columbus		Quick	15,087	11–20–2	24	Recap
34	December 15	Los Angeles	3–4	Pittsburgh	OT	Quick	18,627	11–20–3	25	Recap
35	December 18	Winnipeg	1–4	Los Angeles		Quick	17,405	12–20–3	27	Recap
36	December 22	Los Angeles	3–2	San Jose	OT	Quick	17,562	13–20–3	29	Recap
37	December 23	Los Angeles	4–3	Vegas	OT	Petersen	18,225	14–20–3	31	Recap
38	December 27	Arizona	1–2	Los Angeles		Quick	18,230	15–20–3	33	Recap
39	December 29	Vegas	4–1	Los Angeles		Quick	18,230	15–21–3	33	Recap
40	December 31	Los Angeles	3–2	Colorado	OT	Quick	18,017	16–21–3	35	Recap

January: 4–5–1 (Home: 3–2–0; Road: 1–3–1)
#	Date	Visitor	Score	Home	OT	Decision	Attendance	Record	Pts	Recap
41	January 1	Los Angeles	0–2	Vegas		Campbell	18,319	16–22–3	35	Recap
42	January 3	Tampa Bay	6–2	Los Angeles		Quick	17,551	16–23–3	35	Recap
43	January 5	Edmonton	0–4	Los Angeles		Quick	18,230	17–23–3	37	Recap
44	January 7	Los Angeles	1–3	San Jose		Campbell	15,447	17–24–3	37	Recap
45	January 10	Ottawa	4–1	Los Angeles		Quick	17,713	17–25–3	37	Recap
46	January 12	Pittsburgh	2–5	Los Angeles		Quick	18,414	18–25–3	39	Recap
47	January 15	Los Angeles	2–3	Minnesota	SO	Quick	19,017	18–25–4	40	Recap
48	January 17	Los Angeles	2–1	Dallas		Campbell	18,045	19–25–4	42	Recap
49	January 19	Los Angeles	1–7	Colorado		Quick	18,043	19–26–4	42	Recap
50	January 21	St. Louis	3–4	Los Angeles		Quick	18,230	20–26–4	44	Recap

February: 3–7–4 (Home: 0–2–2; Road: 3–5–2)
#	Date	Visitor	Score	Home	OT	Decision	Attendance	Record	Pts	Recap
51	February 2	Los Angeles	2–4	NY Islanders		Quick	13,917	20–27–4	44	Recap
52	February 4	Los Angeles	4–3	NY Rangers	OT	Quick	16,233	21–27–4	46	Recap
53	February 5	Los Angeles	5–1	New Jersey		Campbell	14,508	22–27–4	48	Recap
54	February 7	Los Angeles	3–2	Philadelphia	SO	Quick	18,982	23–27–4	50	Recap
55	February 9	Los Angeles	4–5	Boston	OT	Quick	17,565	23–27–5	51	Recap
56	February 11	Los Angeles	4–6	Washington		Quick	18,506	23–28–5	51	Recap
57	February 14	Vancouver	4–3	Los Angeles	SO	Quick	18,230	23–28–6	52	Recap
58	February 16	Boston	4–2	Los Angeles		Campbell	18,230	23–29–6	52	Recap
59	February 18	Washington	3–2	Los Angeles		Campbell	18,230	23–30–6	52	Recap
60	February 21	Los Angeles	1–2	Nashville		Quick	17,510	23–31–6	52	Recap
61	February 23	Los Angeles	1–6	Florida		Quick	14,290	23–32–6	52	Recap
62	February 25	Los Angeles	3–4	Tampa Bay	SO	Campbell	19,092	23–32–7	53	Recap
63	February 26	Los Angeles	1–6	Carolina		Quick	13,042	23–33–7	53	Recap
64	February 28	Dallas	4–3	Los Angeles	OT	Quick	18,230	23–33–8	54	Recap

March: 6–7–1 (Home: 4–5–0; Road: 2–2–1)
#	Date	Visitor	Score	Home	OT	Decision	Attendance	Record	Pts	Recap
65	March 2	Chicago	3–6	Los Angeles		Quick	18,230	24–33–8	56	Recap
66	March 5	Montreal	3–1	Los Angeles		Quick	17,764	24–34–8	56	Recap
67	March 7	St. Louis	4–0	Los Angeles		Quick	17,837	24–35–8	56	Recap
68	March 9	Los Angeles	2–4	Arizona		Campbell	14,976	24–36–8	56	Recap
69	March 10	Los Angeles	3–2	Anaheim		Quick	17,174	25–36–8	58	Recap
70	March 14	Nashville	3–1	Los Angeles		Quick	17,730	25–37–8	58	Recap
71	March 16	Florida	4–3	Los Angeles		Quick	18,022	25–38–8	58	Recap
72	March 18	Winnipeg	3–2	Los Angeles		Campbell	17,842	25–39–8	58	Recap
73	March 21	San Jose	2–4	Los Angeles		Quick	18,230	26–39–8	60	Recap
74	March 23	Anaheim	3–4	Los Angeles	SO	Quick	18,230	27–39–8	62	Recap
75	March 25	Los Angeles	3–0	Calgary		Campbell	18,471	28–39–8	64	Recap
76	March 26	Los Angeles	4–8	Edmonton		Quick	18,347	28–40–8	64	Recap
77	March 28	Los Angeles	2–3	Vancouver	SO	Quick	18,524	28–40–9	65	Recap
78	March 30	Chicago	2–3	Los Angeles	OT	Campbell	18,230	29–40–9	67	Recap

April: 2–2–0 (Home: 1–1–0; Road: 1–1–0)
#	Date	Visitor	Score	Home	OT	Decision	Attendance	Record	Pts	Recap
79	April 1	Calgary	7–2	Los Angeles		Quick	18,117	29–41–9	67	Recap
80	April 2	Los Angeles	3–1	Arizona		Campbell	14,687	30–41–9	69	Recap
81	April 5	Los Angeles	2–5	Anaheim		Campbell	17,306	30–42–9	69	Recap
82	April 6	Vegas	2–5	Los Angeles		Quick	18,230	31–42–9	71	Recap

Legend: Win (2 points) Loss (0 points) Overtime/shootout loss (1 point)

== Player statistics ==
As of April 6, 2019

=== Skaters ===
Regular season
Player	GP	G	A	Pts	+/−	PIM
Anze Kopitar	81	22	38	60	−20	30
Dustin Brown	72	22	29	51	−17	24
Drew Doughty	82	8	37	45	−34	44
Ilya Kovalchuk	64	16	18	34	−26	10
Tyler Toffoli	82	13	21	34	−16	23
Alex Iafallo	82	15	18	33	−17	22
Jeff Carter	76	13	20	33	−20	42
Adrian Kempe	81	12	16	28	−10	50
Austin Wagner	62	12	9	21	2	16
Kyle Clifford	72	11	10	21	4	96
Jake Muzzin^{‡}	50	4	17	21	10	33
Brendan Leipsic^{†}	45	5	13	18	−4	22
Alec Martinez	60	4	14	18	−2	8
Derek Forbort	81	2	12	14	−13	52
Michael Amadio	47	6	7	13	−1	6
Trevor Lewis	44	3	9	12	−9	9
Sean Walker	39	3	7	10	−8	8
Carl Grundstrom	15	5	1	6	−4	6
Nate Thompson^{‡}	53	4	2	6	3	17
Matt Roy	25	2	4	6	−1	8
Dion Phaneuf	67	1	5	6	−21	53
Paul LaDue	33	2	3	5	0	12
Carl Hagelin^{†‡}	22	1	4	5	−2	8
Jonny Brodzinski	13	2	1	3	0	2
Oscar Fantenberg^{‡}	46	2	1	3	−2	10
Nikita Scherbak	8	1	0	1	−4	2
Kurtis MacDermid	11	0	1	1	−1	11
Tanner Pearson^{‡}	17	0	1	1	−9	8
Jaret Anderson-Dolan	5	0	1	1	−2	0
Daniel Brickley	4	0	1	1	−2	0
Sheldon Rempal	7	0	0	0	−1	0
Blake Lizotte	1	0	0	0	−1	0

=== Goaltenders ===
Regular season
Player	GP	GS	TOI	W	L	OT	GA	GAA	SA	SV%	SO	G	A	PIM
Jonathan Quick	46	46	2,647:34	16	23	7	149	3.38	1,329	.888	2	0	2	6
Jack Campbell	31	25	1,592:46	10	14	1	61	2.30	845	.928	2	0	1	0
Cal Petersen	11	10	621:42	5	4	1	27	2.61	355	.924	1	0	0	0
Peter Budaj	3	1	71:45	0	1	0	6	5.02	33	.818	0	0	0	0

^{†}Denotes player spent time with another team before joining the Kings. Stats reflect time with the Kings only.
^{‡}Denotes player was traded mid-season. Stats reflect time with the Kings only.
Bold/italics denotes franchise record.

== Transactions ==
The Kings have been involved in the following transactions during the 2018–19 season.

=== Trades ===
Date	Details		Ref
November 14, 2018	To Pittsburgh Penguins Tanner Pearson	To Los Angeles Kings Carl Hagelin	
November 21, 2018	To Minnesota Wild Stepan Falkovsky	To Los Angeles Kings Pavel Jenys	
January 24, 2019	To Chicago Blackhawks Dominik Kubalik	To Los Angeles Kings ARI's 5th-round pick in 2019	
January 28, 2019	To Toronto Maple Leafs Jake Muzzin	To Los Angeles Kings Sean Durzi; Carl Grundstrom; 1st-round pick in 2019	
February 11, 2019	To Montreal Canadiens Nate Thompson; ARI's 5th-round pick in 2019	To Los Angeles Kings CGY's 4th-round pick in 2019	
February 21, 2019	To Washington Capitals Carl Hagelin	To Los Angeles Kings 3rd-round pick in 2019; Conditional 6th-round pick in 2020	
February 24, 2019	To Chicago Blackhawks Spencer Watson	To Los Angeles Kings Matt Iacopelli	
February 25, 2019	To Calgary Flames Oscar Fantenberg	To Los Angeles Kings 4th-round pick in 2020	

=== Free agents ===
Date	Player	Team	Contract term	Ref
July 1, 2018	Ilya Kovalchuk	from SKA Saint Petersburg (KHL)	3-year	
July 1, 2018	Kevin Gravel	to Edmonton Oilers	1-year	
July 1, 2018	Michael Mersch	to Dallas Stars	2-year	
July 1, 2018	Tobias Rieder	to Edmonton Oilers	1-year	
July 1, 2018	Jordan Subban	to Toronto Maple Leafs	1-year	
July 1, 2018	Scott Wedgewood	to Buffalo Sabres	1-year	
July 3, 2018	Sean Walker	from Ontario Reign (AHL)	2-year	
July 5, 2018	Christian Folin	to Philadelphia Flyers	1-year	
July 14, 2018	Zack Mitchell	from Minnesota Wild	1-year	
July 16, 2018	Torrey Mitchell	to Lausanne (NL)	1-year	
August 9, 2018	Andrew Crescenzi	to Bozen–Bolzano (EBEL)	Unknown	
April 2, 2019	Blake Lizotte	from St. Cloud State Huskies (NCHC)	3-year	

=== Waivers ===
Date	Player	Team	Ref
December 2, 2018	Nikita Scherbak	from Montreal Canadiens	
December 3, 2018	Brendan Leipsic	from Vancouver Canucks	

=== Contract terminations ===
Date	Player	Via	Ref
July 5, 2018	Damir Sharipzyanov	Mutual termination	
June 15, 2019	Dion Phaneuf	Buyout	

=== Retirement ===
Date	Player	Ref

=== Signings ===
Date	Player	Contract term	Ref
July 1, 2018	Drew Doughty	8-year	
July 13, 2018	Rasmus Kupari	3-year	
July 13, 2018	Paul LaDue	2-year	
July 15, 2018	Kurtis MacDermid	2-year	
July 18, 2018	Alex Lintuniemi	1-year	
August 25, 2018	Drake Rymsha	3-year	
March 16, 2019	Akil Thomas	3-year	
April 1, 2019	Sean Durzi	3-year	
April 23, 2019	Mikey Anderson	3-year	
April 30, 2019	Markus Phillips	3-year	
May 13, 2019	Nikolai Prokhorkin	1-year	
June 10, 2019	Jonah Sodergran	3-year	

== Draft picks ==
Below are the Los Angeles Kings' selections at the 2018 NHL entry draft, which was held on June 22 and 23, 2018, at the American Airlines Center in Dallas, Texas.

Round	#	Player	Pos	Nationality	College/Junior/Club team (League)
1	20	Rasmus Kupari	C	Finland	Karpat (Liiga)
2	51	Akil Thomas	C	Canada	Niagara IceDogs (OHL)
3	82	Bulat Shafigullin	LW	Russia	Neftekhimik Nizhnekamsk (KHL)
4	113	Aidan Dudas	C	Canada	Owen Sound Attack (OHL)
5	144	David Hrenak	G	Slovakia	St. Cloud State University (NCHC)
6	165^{1}	Johan Sodergran	RW	Sweden	Linkopings HC J20 (SuperElit)
6	175	Jacob Ingham	G	Canada	Mississauga Steelheads (OHL)

Notes:

1. The New York Islanders' sixth-round pick went to the Los Angeles Kings as the result of a trade on June 24, 2017, that sent a sixth-round pick in 2017 to New York in exchange for this pick.
