= 2018–19 Washington Capitals season =

NHL ice hockey team season

2018–19 Washington Capitals
- Metropolitan Division champions
- Division: 1st Metropolitan
- Conference: 3rd Eastern
- 2018–19 record: 48–26–8
- Home record: 24–11–6
- Road record: 24–15–2
- Goals for: 278
- Goals against: 249

Team information
- General manager: Brian MacLellan
- Coach: Todd Reirden
- Captain: Alexander Ovechkin
- Alternate captains: Nicklas Backstrom; Brooks Orpik
- Arena: Capital One Arena
- Average attendance: 18,508
- Minor league affiliates: Hershey Bears (AHL); South Carolina Stingrays (ECHL)

Team leaders
- Goals: Alexander Ovechkin (51)
- Assists: John Carlson (57)
- Points: Alexander Ovechkin (89)
- Penalty minutes: Tom Wilson (128)
- Plus/minus: Michal Kempny (+24)
- Wins: Braden Holtby (32)
- Goals against average: Braden Holtby (2.82)

The 2018–19 Washington Capitals season was the 45th season for the National Hockey League (NHL) franchise that was established on June 11, 1974. It was the first season with new head coach Todd Reirden. They entered the season as the defending Stanley Cup champions. The Capitals clinched a playoff spot on March 28, 2019, after a 3–2 win over the Carolina Hurricanes. On April 4, the team defended their division title in a 2–1 win against the Montreal Canadiens.

The Capitals faced the Carolina Hurricanes in the 2019 Stanley Cup playoffs, where they lost in seven games after taking a 2–0 series lead. This was the eleventh time the Capitals have lost a playoff series after taking a 2–game lead in their franchise history.

== Standings ==
Metropolitan Division
Pos	Team	GP	W	L	OTL	ROW	GF	GA	GD	Pts
1	y – Washington Capitals	82	48	26	8	44	278	249	+29	104
2	x – New York Islanders	82	48	27	7	43	228	196	+32	103
3	x – Pittsburgh Penguins	82	44	26	12	42	273	241	+32	100
4	x – Carolina Hurricanes	82	46	29	7	44	245	223	+22	99
5	x – Columbus Blue Jackets	82	47	31	4	45	258	232	+26	98
6	Philadelphia Flyers	82	37	37	8	34	244	281	−37	82
7	New York Rangers	82	32	36	14	26	227	272	−45	78
8	New Jersey Devils	82	31	41	10	28	222	275	−53	72

Source: National Hockey League
x – Clinched playoff spot; y – Clinched division

== Schedule and results ==
=== Preseason ===
The preseason schedule was published on June 18, 2018.

2018 preseason game log: 2–3–2 (Home: 1–1–1; Road: 1–2–1)

Game	Date	Opponent	Score	Record
1	September 16	@ Boston	1–2 SO	0–0–1
2	September 18	Boston	2–5	0–1–1
3	September 20	@ Montreal	2–5	0–2–1
4	September 21	@ Carolina	1–5	0–3–1
5	September 25	@ St. Louis	4–0	1–3–1
6	September 28	Carolina	4–5 OT	1–3–2
7	September 30	St. Louis	5–2	2–3–2

=== Regular season ===
The regular season schedule was released on June 21, 2018.

2018–19 game log
October: 5–3–2, 12 points (Home: 3–1–1; Road: 2–2–1)

Game	Date	Opponent	Score	OT	Decision	Location	Attendance	Record	Points	Recap
1	October 3	Boston	7–0		Holtby	Capital One Arena	18,506	1–0–0	2	Recap
2	October 4	@ Pittsburgh	6–7	OT	Holtby	PPG Paints Arena	18,627	1–0–1	3	Recap
3	October 10	Vegas	5–2		Holtby	Capital One Arena	18,506	2–0–1	5	Recap
4	October 11	@ New Jersey	0–6		Copley	Prudential Center	16,514	2–1–1	5	Recap
5	October 13	Toronto	2–4		Holtby	Capital One Arena	18,506	2–2–1	5	Recap
6	October 17	NY Rangers	4–3	OT	Holtby	Capital One Arena	18,506	3–2–1	7	Recap
7	October 19	Florida	5–6	SO	Copley	Capital One Arena	18,506	3–2–2	8	Recap
8	October 22	@ Vancouver	5–2		Holtby	Rogers Arena	17,227	4–2–2	10	Recap
9	October 25	@ Edmonton	1–4		Holtby	Rogers Place	18,347	4–3–2	10	Recap
10	October 27	@ Calgary	4–3	SO	Copley	Scotiabank Saddledome	17,832	5–3–2	12	Recap

November: 10–4–1, 21 points (Home: 5–2–1; Road: 5–2–0)

Game	Date	Opponent	Score	OT	Decision	Location	Attendance	Record	Points	Recap
11	November 1	@ Montreal	4–6		Holtby	Bell Centre	20,279	5–4–2	12	Recap
12	November 3	Dallas	3–4	OT	Holtby	Capital One Arena	18,506	5–4–3	13	Recap
13	November 5	Edmonton	4–2		Copley	Capital One Arena	18,506	6–4–3	15	Recap
14	November 7	Pittsburgh	2–1		Holtby	Capital One Arena	18,506	7–4–3	17	Recap
15	November 9	Columbus	1–2		Holtby	Capital One Arena	18,506	7–5–3	17	Recap
16	November 11	Arizona	1–4		Holtby	Capital One Arena	18,506	7–6–3	17	Recap
17	November 13	@ Minnesota	5–2		Copley	Xcel Energy Center	19,101	8–6–3	19	Recap
18	November 14	@ Winnipeg	1–3		Copley	Bell MTS Place	15,321	8–7–3	19	Recap
19	November 16	@ Colorado	3–2	OT	Copley	Pepsi Center	18,050	9–7–3	21	Recap
20	November 19	@ Montreal	5–4	OT	Holtby	Bell Centre	21,911	10–7–3	23	Recap
21	November 21	Chicago	4–2		Holtby	Capital One Arena	18,506	11–7–3	25	Recap
22	November 23	Detroit	3–1		Holtby	Capital One Arena	18,506	12–7–3	27	Recap
23	November 24	@ NY Rangers	5–3		Copley	Madison Square Garden	16,884	13–7–3	29	Recap
24	November 26	@ NY Islanders	4–1		Holtby	Barclays Center	9,072	14–7–3	31	Recap
25	November 30	New Jersey	6–3		Holtby	Capital One Arena	18,506	15–7–3	33	Recap

December: 9–4–0, 18 points (Home: 4–3–0; Road: 5–1–0)

Game	Date	Opponent	Score	OT	Decision	Location	Attendance	Record	Points	Recap
26	December 2	Anaheim	5–6		Holtby	Capital One Arena	18,506	15–8–3	33	Recap
27	December 4	@ Vegas	3–5		Holtby	T-Mobile Arena	18,275	15–9–3	33	Recap
28	December 6	@ Arizona	4–2		Copley	Gila River Arena	11,910	16–9–3	35	Recap
29	December 8	@ Columbus	4–0		Holtby	Nationwide Arena	18,501	17–9–3	37	Recap
30	December 11	Detroit	6–2		Holtby	Capital One Arena	18,506	18–9–3	39	Recap
31	December 14	@ Carolina	6–5	SO	Holtby	PNC Arena	14,446	19–9–3	41	Recap
32	December 15	Buffalo	4–3	SO	Copley	Capital One Arena	18,506	20–9–3	43	Recap
33	December 19	Pittsburgh	1–2		Holtby	Capital One Arena	18,506	20–10–3	43	Recap
34	December 21	Buffalo	2–1		Holtby	Capital One Arena	18,506	21–10–3	45	Recap
35	December 22	@ Ottawa	4–0		Copley	Canadian Tire Centre	15,605	22–10–3	47	Recap
36	December 27	Carolina	3–1		Holtby	Capital One Arena	18,506	23–10–3	49	Recap
37	December 29	@ Ottawa	3–2		Copley	Canadian Tire Centre	16,808	24–10–3	51	Recap
38	December 31	Nashville	3–6		Holtby	Capital One Arena	18,506	24–11–3	51	Recap

January: 3–6–3, 9 points (Home: 1–2–2; Road: 2–4–1)

Game	Date	Opponent	Score	OT	Decision	Location	Attendance	Record	Points	Recap
39	January 3	@ St. Louis	2–5		Holtby	Enterprise Center	17,200	24–12–3	51	Recap
40	January 4	@ Dallas	1–2	OT	Copley	American Airlines Center	18,532	24–12–4	52	Recap
41	January 6	@ Detroit	3–2		Holtby	Little Caesars Arena	19,515	25–12–4	54	Recap
42	January 8	Philadelphia	5–3		Copley	Capital One Arena	18,506	26–12–4	56	Recap
43	January 10	@ Boston	4–2		Holtby	TD Garden	17,565	27–12–4	58	Recap
44	January 12	Columbus	1–2	OT	Copley	Capital One Arena	18,506	27–12–5	59	Recap
45	January 14	St. Louis	1–4		Copley	Capital One Arena	18,506	27–13–5	59	Recap
46	January 15	@ Nashville	2–7		Copley	Bridgestone Arena	17,336	27–14–5	59	Recap
47	January 18	NY Islanders	0–2		Holtby	Capital One Arena	18,506	27–15–5	59	Recap
48	January 20	@ Chicago	5–8		Copley	United Center	21,316	27–16–5	59	Recap
49	January 22	San Jose	6–7	OT	Holtby	Capital One Arena	18,506	27–16–6	60	Recap
50	January 23	@ Toronto	3–6		Holtby	Scotiabank Arena	19,148	27–17–6	60	Recap

February: 9–4–1, 19 points (Home: 6–1–1; Road: 3–3–0)

Game	Date	Opponent	Score	OT	Decision	Location	Attendance	Record	Points	Recap
51	February 1	Calgary	4–3		Holtby	Capital One Arena	18,506	28–17–6	62	Recap
52	February 3	Boston	0–1		Holtby	Capital One Arena	18,506	28–18–6	62	Recap
53	February 5	Vancouver	3–2		Holtby	Capital One Arena	18,506	29–18–6	64	Recap
54	February 7	Colorado	4–3	OT	Copley	Capital One Arena	18,506	30–18–6	66	Recap
55	February 9	Florida	4–5	OT	Holtby	Capital One Arena	18,506	30–18–7	67	Recap
56	February 11	Los Angeles	6–4		Copley	Capital One Arena	18,506	31–18–7	69	Recap
57	February 12	@ Columbus	0–3		Holtby	Nationwide Arena	15,701	31–19–7	69	Recap
58	February 14	@ San Jose	5–1		Holtby	SAP Center	17,562	32–19–7	71	Recap
59	February 17	@ Anaheim	2–5		Holtby	Honda Center	17,495	32–20–7	71	Recap
60	February 18	@ Los Angeles	3–2		Copley	Staples Center	18,230	33–20–7	73	Recap
61	February 21	@ Toronto	3–2		Holtby	Scotiabank Arena	19,378	34–20–7	75	Recap
62	February 23	@ Buffalo	2–5		Holtby	KeyBank Center	19,070	34–21–7	75	Recap
63	February 24	NY Rangers	6–5	OT	Copley	Capital One Arena	18,506	35–21–7	77	Recap
64	February 26	Ottawa	7–2		Holtby	Capital One Arena	18,506	36–21–7	79	Recap

March: 11–3–1, 23 points (Home: 4–1–1; Road: 7–2–0)

Game	Date	Opponent	Score	OT	Decision	Location	Attendance	Record	Points	Recap
65	March 1	@ NY Islanders	3–1		Holtby	Nassau Coliseum	13,971	37–21–7	81	Recap
66	March 3	@ NY Rangers	3–2	SO	Holtby	Madison Square Garden	17,517	38–21–7	83	Recap
67	March 6	@ Philadelphia	5–3		Holtby	Wells Fargo Center	19,232	39–21–7	85	Recap
68	March 8	New Jersey	3–0		Holtby	Capital One Arena	18,506	40–21–7	87	Recap
69	March 10	Winnipeg	3–1		Copley	Capital One Arena	18,506	41–21–7	89	Recap
70	March 12	@ Pittsburgh	3–5		Holtby	PPG Paints Arena	18,640	41–22–7	89	Recap
71	March 14	@ Philadelphia	5–2		Holtby	Wells Fargo Center	19,475	42–22–7	91	Recap
72	March 16	@ Tampa Bay	3–6		Holtby	Amalie Arena	19,092	42–23–7	91	Recap
73	March 19	@ New Jersey	4–1		Copley	Prudential Center	14,815	43–23–7	93	Recap
74	March 20	Tampa Bay	4–5	OT	Holtby	Capital One Arena	18,506	43–23–8	94	Recap
75	March 22	Minnesota	1–2		Holtby	Capital One Arena	18,506	43–24–8	94	Recap
76	March 24	Philadelphia	3–1		Holtby	Capital One Arena	18,506	44–24–8	96	Recap
77	March 26	Carolina	4–1		Holtby	Capital One Arena	18,506	45–24–8	98	Recap
78	March 28	@ Carolina	3–2		Holtby	PNC Arena	14,680	46–24–8	100	Recap
79	March 30	@ Tampa Bay	6–3		Holtby	Amalie Arena	19,092	47–24–8	102	Recap

April: 1–2–0, 2 points (Home: 1–1–0; Road: 0–1–0)

Game	Date	Opponent	Score	OT	Decision	Location	Attendance	Record	Points	Recap
80	April 1	@ Florida	3–5		Copley	BB&T Center	14,376	47–25–8	102	Recap
81	April 4	Montreal	2–1		Holtby	Capital One Arena	18,506	48–25–8	104	Recap
82	April 6	NY Islanders	0–3		Copley	Capital One Arena	18,506	48–26–8	104	Recap

Win (2 Points) Loss (0 points) Overtime/shootout loss (1 point)

=== Playoffs ===
The Capitals faced the Carolina Hurricanes in the First Round of the playoffs, and were defeated in seven games.

2019 Stanley Cup playoffs
Eastern Conference First Round vs. (WC1) Carolina Hurricanes: Carolina won 4–3

Game	Date	Opponent	Score	OT	Decision	Location	Attendance	Series	Recap
1	April 11	Carolina	4–2		Holtby	Capital One Arena	18,506	1–0	Recap
2	April 13	Carolina	4–3	OT	Holtby	Capital One Arena	18,506	2–0	Recap
3	April 15	@ Carolina	0–5		Holtby	PNC Arena	18,783	2–1	Recap
4	April 18	@ Carolina	1–2		Holtby	PNC Arena	19,202	2–2	Recap
5	April 20	Carolina	6–0		Holtby	Capital One Arena	18,506	3–2	Recap
6	April 22	@ Carolina	2–5		Holtby	PNC Arena	18,913	3–3	Recap
7	April 24	Carolina	3–4	2OT	Holtby	Capital One Arena	18,506	3–4	Recap

Win Loss

== Player statistics ==
As of April 24, 2019

=== Skaters ===
Regular season
Player	GP	G	A	Pts	+/−	PIM
Alexander Ovechkin	81	51	38	89	7	40
Nicklas Backstrom	80	22	52	74	2	30
Evgeny Kuznetsov	76	21	51	72	7	50
John Carlson	80	13	57	70	21	34
T. J. Oshie	69	25	29	54	5	36
Jakub Vrana	82	24	23	47	20	27
Brett Connolly	81	22	24	46	13	24
Tom Wilson	63	22	18	40	11	128
Lars Eller	81	13	23	36	–1	37
Dmitry Orlov	82	3	26	29	3	33
Andre Burakovsky	76	12	13	25	2	14
Matt Niskanen	80	8	17	25	–3	41
Michal Kempny	71	6	19	25	24	60
Nic Dowd	64	8	14	22	10	20
Travis Boyd	53	5	15	20	6	6
Chandler Stephenson	64	5	6	11	–13	0
Carl Hagelin^{†}	20	3	8	11	7	10
Christian Djoos	45	1	9	10	9	4
Brooks Orpik	53	2	7	9	8	32
Devante Smith-Pelly	54	4	4	8	–6	15
Dmitrij Jaskin	37	2	6	8	–5	6
Madison Bowey^{‡}	33	1	5	6	3	38
Nick Jensen^{†}	20	0	5	5	3	4
Jonas Siegenthaler	26	0	4	4	6	10
Tyler Lewington	2	1	1	2	3	7
Nathan Walker	3	0	1	1	1	2

Playoffs
Player	GP	G	A	Pts	+/−	PIM
Alexander Ovechkin	7	4	5	9	–2	19
Nicklas Backstrom	7	5	3	8	–4	4
Evgeny Kuznetsov	7	1	5	6	–1	2
Tom Wilson	7	3	2	5	1	2
John Carlson	7	0	5	5	0	6
Dmitry Orlov	7	0	4	4	–2	4
Lars Eller	7	1	2	3	–1	2
Brett Connolly	7	2	0	2	–2	6
T. J. Oshie	4	1	1	2	0	4
Brooks Orpik	7	1	1	2	–1	0
Andre Burakovsky	7	1	1	2	–3	0
Matt Niskanen	7	0	2	2	0	0
Nic Dowd	7	1	0	1	–1	6
Carl Hagelin	7	0	1	1	–1	0
Jakub Vrana	7	0	0	0	–1	6
Chandler Stephenson	6	0	0	0	–2	2
Devante Smith-Pelly	3	0	0	0	0	0
Nick Jensen	7	0	0	0	–2	2
Jonas Siegenthaler	4	0	0	0	0	2
Christian Djoos	3	0	0	0	–3	0
Travis Boyd	1	0	0	0	0	0

=== Goaltenders ===
Regular season
Player	GP	GS	MIN	W	L	OT	GA	GAA	SA	SV%	SO	G	A	PIM
Braden Holtby	59	58	3,406:34	32	19	5	160	2.82	1,795	.911	3	0	2	2
Pheonix Copley	27	24	1,528:56	16	7	3	74	2.90	776	.905	1	0	1	0

Playoffs
Player	GP	GS	MIN	W	L	GA	GAA	SA	SV%	SO	G	A	PIM
Braden Holtby	7	7	448:58	3	4	20	2.67	233	.914	1	0	0	0

^{†}Denotes player spent time with another team before joining the Capitals. Stats reflect time with the Capitals only.
^{‡}Denotes player was traded mid-season. Stats reflect time with the Capitals only.
Bold/italics denotes franchise record.

== Transactions ==
The Capitals have been involved in the following transactions during the 2018–19 season.

=== Trades ===
Date	Details		Ref
June 22, 2018	To Colorado Avalanche Philipp Grubauer; Brooks Orpik	To Washington Capitals 2nd-round pick in 2018	
June 23, 2018	To Vancouver Canucks 6th-round pick in 2018; 6th-round pick in 2019	To Washington Capitals 6th-round pick in 2018	
February 21, 2019	To Los Angeles Kings 3rd-round pick in 2019; Conditional 6th-round pick in 2020	To Washington Capitals Carl Hagelin	
February 22, 2019	To Detroit Red Wings Madison Bowey; 2nd-round pick in 2020	To Washington Capitals Nick Jensen; BUF's 5th-round pick in 2019	
June 14, 2019	To Philadelphia Flyers Matt Niskanen	To Washington Capitals Radko Gudas	

=== Free agents ===
Date	Player	Team	Contract term	Ref
July 1, 2018	Jay Beagle	to Vancouver Canucks	4-year	
July 1, 2018	Nic Dowd	from Vancouver Canucks	1-year	
July 1, 2018	Tyler Graovac	to Calgary Flames	1-year	
July 2, 2018	Jayson Megna	from Vancouver Canucks	1-year	
July 2, 2018	Michael Sgarbossa	from Winnipeg Jets	1-year	
July 10, 2018	Joe Whitney	to Linköpings (SHL)	2-year	
July 24, 2018	Brooks Orpik	from Colorado Avalanche	1-year	
August 2, 2018	Tim McGauley	to Colorado Eagles (AHL)	Unknown	
August 13, 2018	Zach Sill	to Sparta Praha (ELH)	Unknown	
August 15, 2018	Adam Carlson	to Rapid City Rush (ECHL)	1-year	
August 16, 2018	Wayne Simpson	to Rochester Americans (AHL)	1-year	
August 21, 2018	Anthony Peluso	to Calgary Flames	1-year	
September 1, 2018	Sergei Shumakov	from CSKA Moscow (KHL)	1-year	
October 2, 2018	Alex Chiasson	to Edmonton Oilers	1-year	
February 25, 2019	Parker Milner	from Hershey Bears (AHL)	1-year	
March 18, 2019	Joe Snively	from Yale Bulldogs (ECAC Hockey)	2-year	
April 5, 2019	Bobby Nardella	from Notre Dame Fighting Irish (Big Ten)	2-year	

=== Waivers ===
Date	Player	Team	Ref
October 2, 2018	Dmitrij Jaskin	from St. Louis Blues	

=== Contract terminations ===
Date	Player	Via	Ref
December 7, 2018	Sergei Shumakov	Mutual termination	
May 1, 2019	Maximilian Kammerer	Mutual termination	
May 18, 2019	Juuso Ikonen	Mutual termination	

=== Retirement ===
Date	Player	Ref

=== Signings ===
Date	Player	Contract term	Ref
June 24, 2018	John Carlson	8-year	
June 28, 2018	Devante Smith-Pelly	1-year	
June 29, 2018	Michal Kempny	4-year	
July 1, 2018	Travis Boyd	2-year	
July 2, 2018	Riley Barber	1-year	
July 13, 2018	Liam O'Brien	1-year	
July 19, 2018	Madison Bowey	2-year	
July 24, 2018	Brooks Orpik	1-year	
July 27, 2018	Tom Wilson	6-year	
September 24, 2018	Alexander Alexeyev	3-year	
February 22, 2019	Nick Jensen	4-year	
April 11, 2019	Nic Dowd	3-year	
May 20, 2019	Shane Gersich	1-year	
May 20, 2019	Brian Pinho	1-year	
June 10, 2019	Liam O'Brien	1-year	
June 16, 2019	Carl Hagelin	4-year	

== Draft picks ==
Below are the Washington Capitals' selections at the 2018 NHL entry draft, which was held on June 22 and 23, 2018, at the American Airlines Center in Dallas, Texas.

Round	#	Player	Pos	Nationality	College/Junior/Club team (League)
1	31	Alexander Alexeyev	D	Russia	Red Deer Rebels (WHL)
2	46^{1}	Martin Fehervary	D	Slovakia	IK Oskarshamn (Allsvenskan)
2	47^{2}	Kody Clark	RW	Canada	Ottawa 67's (OHL)
3	93	Riley Sutter	C/RW	Canada	Everett Silvertips (WHL)
5	124	Mitchell Gibson	G	United States	Lone Star Brahmas (NAHL)
6	186	Alex Kannok-Leipert	D	Canada	Vancouver Giants (WHL)
7	217	Eric Florchuk	C	Canada	Victoria Royals (WHL)

Notes:

1. The Florida Panthers' second-round pick went the Washington Capitals as the result of a trade on July 2, 2017, that sent Marcus Johansson to New Jersey in exchange for Toronto's third-round pick in 2018 and this pick.
2. The Colorado Avalanche's second-round pick went to the Washington Capitals as the result of a trade on June 22, 2018, that sent Philipp Grubauer and Brooks Orpik to Colorado in exchange for this pick.
