= 2018–19 Calgary Flames season =

NHL team season

2018–19 Calgary Flames
- Pacific Division champions
- Division: 1st Pacific
- Conference: 1st Western
- 2018–19 record: 50–25–7
- Home record: 26–10–5
- Road record: 24–15–2
- Goals for: 289
- Goals against: 227

Team information
- General manager: Brad Treliving
- Coach: Bill Peters
- Captain: Mark Giordano
- Alternate captains: Mikael Backlund; Sean Monahan; Matthew Tkachuk
- Arena: Scotiabank Saddledome
- Average attendance: 18,501
- Minor league affiliates: Stockton Heat (AHL); Kansas City Mavericks (ECHL)

Team leaders
- Goals: Johnny Gaudreau (36)
- Assists: Johnny Gaudreau (63)
- Points: Johnny Gaudreau (99)
- Penalty minutes: Sam Bennett (93)
- Plus/minus: Mark Giordano (+39)
- Wins: David Rittich (27)
- Goals against average: David Rittich (2.61)

The 2018–19 Calgary Flames season was the Flames' 39th season in Calgary, and the 47th for the National Hockey League (NHL) franchise that was established on June 6, 1972.

The Flames clinched a playoff spot on March 17, 2019, when the Minnesota Wild lost to the New York Islanders. On March 31, the team won its first division title since the 2005–06 season, and clinched the best record in what is now the Western Conference for the first time since the 1989–90 season. They also finished with 50 wins and 107 points, in both cases trailing only the 1989 Stanley Cup champions. The Flames faced the Colorado Avalanche in the first round, losing in five games.

== Standings ==
Pacific Division
Pos	Team	GP	W	L	OTL	ROW	GF	GA	GD	Pts
1	z – Calgary Flames	82	50	25	7	50	289	227	+62	107
2	x – San Jose Sharks	82	46	27	9	46	289	261	+28	101
3	x – Vegas Golden Knights	82	43	32	7	40	249	230	+19	93
4	Arizona Coyotes	82	39	35	8	35	213	223	−10	86
5	Vancouver Canucks	82	35	36	11	29	225	254	−29	81
6	Anaheim Ducks	82	35	37	10	32	199	251	−52	80
7	Edmonton Oilers	82	35	38	9	32	232	274	−42	79
8	Los Angeles Kings	82	31	42	9	28	202	263	−61	71

Source: National Hockey League
x – Clinched playoff spot; z – Clinched conference

== Schedule and results ==
=== Preseason ===
The preseason schedule was published on June 14, 2018.

2018 preseason game log: 4–3–3 (Home: 2–1–2; Road: 2–2–1)
#	Date	Visitor	Score	Home	OT	Decision	Attendance	Record	Recap
1^{[a]}	September 15	Boston	4–3	Calgary	SO	Gillies	–	0–0–1
2	September 17	Edmonton	7–4	Calgary		Rittich	17,311	0–1–1
3^{[A]}^{[b]}	September 19	Calgary	1–3	Boston		Smith	–	0–2–1
4^{[A]}	September 19	Calgary	4–1	Vancouver		Rittich	15,371	1–2–1
5	September 21	Calgary	3–4	Winnipeg	OT	Glass	15,321	1–2–2
6	September 22	Vancouver	2–5	Calgary		Gillies	17,746	2–2–2
7	September 24	Winnipeg	5–4	Calgary	OT	Smith	17,207	2–2–3
8	September 25	San Jose	5–7	Calgary		Gillies	17,584	3–2–3
9	September 27	Calgary	4–3	San Jose		Smith	13,999	4–2–3
10	September 29	Calgary	3–4	Edmonton		Smith	18,347	4–3–3
Notes:^{A} Indicates split-squad.^{a} Game was played at Shenzhen Universiade Sports Centre in Shenzhen, China.^{b} Game was played at Cadillac Arena in Beijing, China.

=== Regular season ===
The regular season schedule was released on June 21, 2018.

2018–19 game log

October: 7–5–1 (Home: 2–2–1; Road: 5–3–0)
#	Date	Visitor	Score	Home	OT	Decision	Attendance	Record	Pts	Recap
1	October 3	Calgary	2–5	Vancouver		Smith	18,870	0–1–0	0
2	October 6	Vancouver	4–7	Calgary		Smith	18,688	1–1–0	2
3	October 9	Calgary	3–0	Nashville		Smith	17,209	2–1–0	4
4	October 11	Calgary	3–5	St. Louis		Smith	16,403	2–2–0	4
5	October 13	Calgary	3–2	Colorado	OT	Rittich	17,334	3–2–0	6
6	October 17	Boston	2–5	Calgary		Smith	17,641	4–2–0	8
7	October 19	Nashville	5–3	Calgary		Smith	18,725	4–3–0	8
8	October 21	Calgary	4–1	NY Rangers		Rittich	17,404	5–3–0	10
9	October 23	Calgary	2–3	Montreal		Rittich	21,028	5–4–0	10
10	October 25	Pittsburgh	9–1	Calgary		Smith	18,834	5–5–0	10
11	October 27	Washington	4–3	Calgary	SO	Smith	17,832	5–5–1	11
12	October 29	Calgary	3–1	Toronto		Smith	18,989	6–5–1	13
13	October 30	Calgary	2–1	Buffalo	OT	Rittich	15,196	7–5–1	15

November: 8–4–1 (Home: 6–1–1; Road: 2–3–0)
#	Date	Visitor	Score	Home	OT	Decision	Attendance	Record	Pts	Recap
14	November 1	Colorado	5–6	Calgary		Smith	17,317	8–5–1	17
15	November 3	Chicago	3–5	Calgary		Rittich	18,143	9–5–1	19
16	November 7	Calgary	2–3	Anaheim		Smith	16,461	9–6–1	19
17	November 10	Calgary	1–0	Los Angeles		Rittich	18,230	10–6–1	21
18	November 11	Calgary	1–3	San Jose		Smith	17,562	10–7–1	21
19	November 15	Montreal	3–2	Calgary		Smith	18,443	10–8–1	21
20	November 17	Edmonton	2–4	Calgary		Rittich	19,289	11–8–1	23
21	November 19	Vegas	2–7	Calgary		Rittich	17,635	12–8–1	25
22	November 21	Winnipeg	3–6	Calgary		Rittich	17,661	13–8–1	27
23	November 23	Calgary	0–2	Vegas		Rittich	18,206	13–9–1	27
24	November 25	Calgary	6–1	Arizona		Smith	12,821	14–9–1	29
25	November 28	Dallas	4–3	Calgary	OT	Rittich	17,676	14–9–2	30
26	November 30	Los Angeles	1–4	Calgary		Smith	17,989	15–9–2	32

December: 9–3–2 (Home: 4–1–2; Road: 5–2–0)
#	Date	Visitor	Score	Home	OT	Decision	Attendance	Record	Pts	Recap
27	December 2	Calgary	3–2	Chicago		Smith	21,704	16–9–2	34
28	December 4	Calgary	9–6	Columbus		Smith	14,885	17–9–2	36
29	December 6	Minnesota	0–2	Calgary		Smith	17,690	18–9–2	38
30	December 8	Nashville	2–5	Calgary		Smith	17,717	19–9–2	40
31	December 9	Calgary	0–1	Edmonton		Rittich	18,347	19–10–2	40
32	December 12	Philadelphia	5–6	Calgary	OT	Rittich	17,763	20–10–2	42
33	December 15	Calgary	2–1	Minnesota		Rittich	18,882	21–10–2	44
34	December 16	Calgary	7–2	St. Louis		Rittich	17,064	22–10–2	46
35	December 18	Calgary	0–2	Dallas		Rittich	18,127	22–11–2	46
36	December 20	Tampa Bay	5–4	Calgary	SO	Rittich	19,289	22–11–3	47
37	December 22	St. Louis	3–1	Calgary		Smith	18,683	22–12–3	47
38	December 27	Calgary	4–1	Winnipeg		Rittich	15,321	23–12–3	49
39	December 29	Vancouver	3–2	Calgary	OT	Rittich	19,289	23–12–4	50
40	December 31	San Jose	5–8	Calgary		Rittich	19,289	24–12–4	52

January: 9–1–1 (Home: 5–0–1; Road: 4–1–0)
#	Date	Visitor	Score	Home	OT	Decision	Attendance	Record	Pts	Recap
41	January 2	Calgary	5–3	Detroit		Smith	19,515	25–12–4	54
42	January 3	Calgary	4–6	Boston		Smith	17,565	25–13–4	54
43	January 5	Calgary	3–2	Philadelphia	OT	Rittich	19,236	26–13–4	56
44	January 7	Calgary	4–3	Chicago		Rittich	21,036	27–13–4	58
45	January 9	Colorado	3–5	Calgary		Rittich	18,220	28–13–4	60
46	January 11	Florida	3–4	Calgary		Rittich	18,579	29–13–4	62
47	January 13	Arizona	1–7	Calgary		Smith	17,849	30–13–4	64
48	January 16	Buffalo	4–3	Calgary	OT	Rittich	18,286	30–13–5	65
49	January 18	Detroit	4–6	Calgary		Smith	19,289	31–13–5	67
50	January 19	Calgary	5–2	Edmonton		Rittich	18,347	32–13–5	69
51	January 22	Carolina	2–3	Calgary	OT	Rittich	18,508	33–13–5	71
January 24–27		All-Star Break in San Jose, California

February: 8–3–2 (Home: 3–1–0; Road: 5–2–2)
#	Date	Visitor	Score	Home	OT	Decision	Attendance	Record	Pts	Recap
52	February 1	Calgary	3–4	Washington		Smith	18,506	33–14–5	71
53	February 3	Calgary	4–3	Carolina		Rittich	12,621	34–14–5	73
54	February 7	San Jose	5–2	Calgary		Smith	18,748	34–15–5	73
55	February 9	Calgary	3–4	Vancouver	SO	Rittich	18,410	34–15–6	74
56	February 12	Calgary	3–6	Tampa Bay		Rittich	19,092	34–16–6	74
57	February 14	Calgary	2–3	Florida	SO	Smith	10,198	34–16–7	75
58	February 16	Calgary	5–4	Pittsburgh		Smith	18,667	35–16–7	77
59	February 18	Arizona	2–5	Calgary		Smith	18,985	36–16–7	79
60	February 20	NY Islanders	2–4	Calgary		Smith	18,632	37–16–7	81
61	February 22	Anaheim	1–2	Calgary		Smith	18,960	38–16–7	83
62	February 24	Calgary	2–1	Ottawa		Rittich	13,160	39–16–7	85
63	February 26	Calgary	3–1	NY Islanders		Smith	13,097	40–16–7	87
64	February 27	Calgary	2–1	New Jersey		Rittich	12,019	41–16–7	89

March: 8–7–0 (Home: 6–4–0; Road: 2–3–0)
#	Date	Visitor	Score	Home	OT	Decision	Attendance	Record	Pts	Recap
65	March 2	Minnesota	4–2	Calgary		Smith	19,289	41–17–7	89
66	March 4	Toronto	6–2	Calgary		Rittich	19,289	41–18–7	89
67	March 6	Calgary	1–2	Vegas		Rittich	18,422	41–19–7	89
68	March 7	Calgary	0–2	Arizona		Smith	13,341	41–20–7	89
69	March 10	Vegas	3–6	Calgary		Rittich	19,086	42–20–7	91
70	March 12	New Jersey	4–9	Calgary		Rittich	18,529	43–20–7	93
71	March 15	NY Rangers	1–5	Calgary		Rittich	18,956	44–20–7	95
72	March 16	Calgary	1–2	Winnipeg		Smith	15,321	44–21–7	95
73	March 19	Columbus	2–4	Calgary		Rittich	18,288	45–21–7	97
74	March 21	Ottawa	1–5	Calgary		Smith	18,793	46–21–7	99
75	March 23	Calgary	3–1	Vancouver		Smith	18,685	47–21–7	101
76	March 25	Los Angeles	3–0	Calgary		Smith	18,471	47–22–7	101
77	March 27	Dallas	2–1	Calgary		Rittich	18,881	47–23–7	101
78	March 29	Anaheim	1–6	Calgary		Smith	19,030	48–23–7	103
79	March 31	Calgary	5–3	San Jose		Smith	17,313	49–23–7	105

April: 1–2–0 (Home: 0–1–0; Road: 1–1–0)
#	Date	Visitor	Score	Home	OT	Decision	Attendance	Record	Pts	Recap
80	April 1	Calgary	7–2	Los Angeles		Rittich	18,117	50–23–7	107
81	April 3	Calgary	1–3	Anaheim		Rittich	17,174	50–24–7	107
82	April 6	Edmonton	3–1	Calgary		Smith	19,289	50–25–7	107

Legend: Win (2 points) Loss (0 points) Overtime/shootout loss (1 point)

=== Playoffs ===
The Flames faced the Colorado Avalanche in the First Round of the playoffs. and were defeated in five games.

2019 Stanley Cup playoffs

Western Conference First Round vs. (WC2) Colorado Avalanche: Colorado won 4–1
#	Date	Visitor	Score	Home	OT	Decision	Attendance	Series	Recap
1	April 11	Colorado	0–4	Calgary		Smith	19,289	1–0
2	April 13	Colorado	3–2	Calgary	OT	Smith	19,289	1–1
3	April 15	Calgary	2–6	Colorado		Smith	18,098	1–2
4	April 17	Calgary	2–3	Colorado	OT	Smith	18,102	1–3
5	April 19	Colorado	5–1	Calgary		Smith	19,289	1–4

Legend: Win Loss

== Player statistics ==
As of April 19, 2019

=== Skaters ===
Regular season
Player	GP	G	A	Pts	+/−	PIM
Johnny Gaudreau	82	36	63	99	18	24
Sean Monahan	78	34	48	82	7	12
Elias Lindholm	81	27	51	78	30	20
Matthew Tkachuk	80	34	43	77	14	62
Mark Giordano	78	17	57	74	39	69
Mikael Backlund	77	21	26	47	34	52
Derek Ryan	81	13	25	38	21	24
Michael Frolik	65	16	18	34	24	26
T. J. Brodie	79	9	25	34	29	24
Noah Hanifin	80	5	28	33	18	12
Mark Jankowski	79	14	18	32	6	12
Sam Bennett	71	13	14	27	−6	93
Garnet Hathaway	76	11	8	19	14	56
James Neal	63	7	12	19	−5	28
Travis Hamonic	69	7	12	19	21	33
Rasmus Andersson	79	2	17	19	17	23
Austin Czarnik	54	6	12	18	−1	8
Andrew Mangiapane	44	8	5	13	11	12
Oliver Kylington	38	3	5	8	3	10
Alan Quine	13	3	2	5	0	6
Dillon Dube	25	1	4	5	2	4
Michael Stone	14	0	5	5	0	10
Juuso Valimaki	24	1	2	3	−2	12
Dalton Prout	20	1	1	2	1	8
Oscar Fantenberg^{†}	15	0	1	1	5	7
Anthony Peluso	4	0	0	0	−1	7
Ryan Lomberg	4	0	0	0	0	17
Curtis Lazar	1	0	0	0	−1	0
Kerby Rychel	2	0	0	0	−1	0

Playoffs
Player	GP	G	A	Pts	+/-	PIM
Sam Bennett	5	1	4	5	0	16
Matthew Tkachuk	5	2	1	3	−4	18
Rasmus Andersson	5	1	2	3	−1	2
Mikael Backlund	5	1	2	3	−5	8
T. J. Brodie	5	2	0	2	−1	6
Sean Monahan	5	1	1	2	1	0
Elias Lindholm	5	1	1	2	−5	4
Mark Giordano	5	0	2	2	−3	0
Derek Ryan	5	1	0	1	1	2
Andrew Mangiapane	5	1	0	1	1	0
Johnny Gaudreau	5	0	1	1	−2	2
Juuso Välimäki	2	0	1	1	1	0
Noah Hanifin	5	0	1	1	−3	4
James Neal	4	0	0	0	−3	0
Austin Czarnik	1	0	0	0	−1	0
Mark Jankowski	5	0	0	0	−2	0
Travis Hamonic	5	0	0	0	−4	2
Garnet Hathaway	5	0	0	0	0	14
Michael Frolik	5	0	0	0	−1	2
Oscar Fantenberg	3	0	0	0	1	6

=== Goaltenders ===
Regular season
Player	GP	GS	TOI	W	L	OT	GA	GAA	SA	SV%	SO	G	A	PIM
David Rittich	45	42	2,503:20	27	9	5	109	2.61	1,228	.911	1	0	0	4
Mike Smith	42	40	2,400:19	23	16	2	109	2.72	1,069	.898	2	0	3	2

Playoffs
Player	GP	GS	TOI	W	L	GA	GAA	SA	SV%	SO	G	A	PIM
Mike Smith	5	5	318:32	1	4	17	3.20	205	.917	1	0	1	4

^{†}Denotes player spent time with another team before joining the Flames. Stats reflect time with the Flames only.
^{‡}Denotes player was traded mid-season. Stats reflect time with the Flames only.
Bold/italics denotes franchise record.

== Transactions ==
=== Player signings ===
Date	Player	Contract term	Ref
July 1, 2018	Dalton Prout	1-year	
July 15, 2018	Morgan Klimchuk	1-year	
July 16, 2018	Elias Lindholm	6-year	
July 17, 2018	Jon Gillies	2-years	
July 25, 2018	Mark Jankowski	2-year	
July 25, 2018	Brett Kulak	1-year	
July 26, 2018	David Rittich	1-year	
July 30, 2018	Garnet Hathaway	1-year	
August 20, 2018	Kerby Rychel	1-year	
August 30, 2018	Noah Hanifin	6-year	
March 30, 2019	Dmitri Zavgorodny	3-year	
April 12, 2019	Adam Ruzicka	3-year	
April 20, 2019	Martin Pospisil	3-year	
June 13, 2019	Eetu Tuulola	3-year	

=== Trades ===
Date	Details		Ref
June 5, 2018	To Montreal Canadiens 4th-round pick in 2019	To Calgary Flames WPG's 4th-round pick in 2018	
June 23, 2018	To Carolina Hurricanes Dougie Hamilton; Micheal Ferland; Adam Fox	To Calgary Flames Noah Hanifin; Elias Lindholm	
August 20, 2018	To Montreal Canadiens Hunter Shinkaruk	To Calgary Flames Kerby Rychel	
October 1, 2018	To Montreal Canadiens Brett Kulak	To Calgary Flames Matt Taormina; Rinat Valiev	
November 27, 2018	To Toronto Maple Leafs Morgan Klimchuk	To Calgary Flames Andrew Nielsen	
February 25, 2019	To Los Angeles Kings 4th-round pick in 2020	To Calgary Flames Oscar Fantenberg	

=== Additions and subtractions ===
Additions
Player	Former team	Via
Austin Czarnik	Boston Bruins	Free agency
Tyler Graovac	Washington Capitals	Free agency
Alan Quine	New York Islanders	Free agency
Derek Ryan	Carolina Hurricanes	Free agency
James Neal	Vegas Golden Knights	Free agency
Buddy Robinson	Winnipeg Jets	Free agency
Anthony Peluso	Washington Capitals	Free agency
Luke Philp	Alberta Golden Bears (U Sports)	Free agency
Artyom Zagidulin	Metallurg Magnitogorsk (KHL)	Free agency
Carl-Johan Lerby	Malmö Redhawks (SHL)	Free agency
Alexander Yelesin	Lokomotiv Yaroslavl (KHL)	Free agency

Subtractions
Player	New team	Via
Daniel Pribyl	Sparta Praha (ELH)	Free agency
Matt Bartkowski	Minnesota Wild	Free agency
Cody Goloubef	Boston Bruins	Free agency
Marek Hrivik	Vityaz Podolsk (KHL)	Free agency
Tyler Wotherspoon	St. Louis Blues	Free agency
Austin Carroll	Utah Grizzlies (ECHL)	Free agency
Troy Brouwer	Florida Panthers	Released
Matt Stajan	Red Bull München (DEL)	Free agency
Tanner Glass	Boxers de Bordeaux (Ligue Magnus)	Free agency
Kris Versteeg	Avangard Omsk (KHL)	Free agency
Nick Shore	Metallurg Magnitogorsk (KHL)	Free agency
Yasin Ehliz	Red Bull München (DEL)	Released
Marcus Hogstrom	Djurgårdens IF (SHL)	Free agency

== Draft picks ==
Below are the Calgary Flames' selections at the 2018 NHL entry draft, which was held on June 22 and 23, 2018, at the American Airlines Center in Dallas, Texas.

Round	#	Player	Pos	Nationality	College/Junior/Club team (League)
4	105	Martin Pospisil	C	Slovakia	Sioux City Musketeers (USHL)
4	108^{1}	Demetrios Koumontzis	LW	United States	Edina High School (USHS)
4	122^{2}	Milos Roman	C	Slovakia	Vancouver Giants (WHL)
6	167	Mathias Emilio Pettersen	C	Norway	Muskegon Lumberjacks (USHL)
7	198	Dmitri Zavgorodny	LW	Russia	Rimouski Oceanic (QMJHL)

Notes:

1. The Florida Panthers' fourth-round pick went to the Calgary Flames as the result of a trade on February 27, 2016, that sent Jiri Hudler to Florida in exchange for a second-round pick in 2016 and this pick.
2. The Winnipeg Jets' fourth-round pick went to the Calgary Flames as the result of a trade on June 23, 2018, that sent a fourth-round pick in 2019 to Montreal in exchange for this pick.
