= 2018–19 Vegas Golden Knights season =

2nd season in team history

2018–19 Vegas Golden Knights
- Division: 3rd Pacific
- Conference: 7th Western
- 2018–19 record: 43–32–7
- Home record: 24–12–5
- Road record: 19–20–2
- Goals for: 249
- Goals against: 230

Team information
- General manager: George McPhee
- Coach: Gerard Gallant
- Captain: Vacant
- Alternate captains: Pierre-Edouard Bellemare; Deryk Engelland; Max Pacioretty; Reilly Smith
- Arena: T-Mobile Arena
- Average attendance: 18,318
- Minor league affiliates: Chicago Wolves (AHL); Fort Wayne Komets (ECHL)

Team leaders
- Goals: Jonathan Marchessault (25)
- Assists: Jonathan Marchessault; Reilly Smith (34)
- Points: Jonathan Marchessault (59)
- Penalty minutes: Ryan Reaves (74)
- Plus/minus: Nate Schmidt (+22)
- Wins: Marc-Andre Fleury (35)
- Goals against average: Marc-Andre Fleury (2.51)

The 2018–19 Vegas Golden Knights season was the second season for the National Hockey League (NHL) franchise that started playing in the 2017–18 season.

The Golden Knights bolstered their lineup during the offseason with the signing of Paul Stastny, as well as the acquisition former Montreal Canadiens captain Max Pacioretty. They also acquired goal-scoring forward Mark Stone from the Ottawa Senators at the 2019 NHL Trade Deadline, and subsequently signed him to an 8-year contract extension.

Prior to the season, the NHL suspended defenseman Nate Schmidt for 20 regular season games for violating the terms of the NHL/NHLPA Performance Enhancing Substances Program. On March 29, 2019, the Golden Knights clinched a playoff spot after the Arizona Coyotes' 3–2 overtime loss to the Colorado Avalanche.

Despite leading the series against the San Jose Sharks 3–1 in the first round of the Stanley Cup playoffs, the Golden Knights were eliminated in seven games, after blowing a 3–0 3rd period lead in the deciding game following a controversial major penalty.

== Standings ==
Pacific Division
Pos	Team	GP	W	L	OTL	ROW	GF	GA	GD	Pts
1	z – Calgary Flames	82	50	25	7	50	289	227	+62	107
2	x – San Jose Sharks	82	46	27	9	46	289	261	+28	101
3	x – Vegas Golden Knights	82	43	32	7	40	249	230	+19	93
4	Arizona Coyotes	82	39	35	8	35	213	223	−10	86
5	Vancouver Canucks	82	35	36	11	29	225	254	−29	81
6	Anaheim Ducks	82	35	37	10	32	199	251	−52	80
7	Edmonton Oilers	82	35	38	9	32	232	274	−42	79
8	Los Angeles Kings	82	31	42	9	28	202	263	−61	71

Source: National Hockey League
x – Clinched playoff spot; z – Clinched conference

== Schedule and results ==
=== Preseason ===
The preseason schedule was released on June 18, 2018.

2018 preseason game log: 6–1–0 (Home: 3–1–0; Road: 3–0–0)
#	Date	Visitor	Score	Home	OT	Decision	Attendance	Record	Recap
1	September 16	Arizona	2–7	Vegas		Ferguson	17,567	1–0–0
2	September 18	Vegas	5–1	Colorado		Fucale	—	2–0–0
3	September 20	Vegas	7–2	Los Angeles		Dansk	12,916	3–0–0
4	September 22	Vegas	5–4	San Jose	SO	Lagace	—	4–0–0
5	September 24	Colorado	5–3	Vegas		Subban	17,880	4–1–0
6	September 28	Los Angeles	0–2	Vegas		Fleury	17,928	5–1–0
7	September 30	San Jose	2–5	Vegas		Fleury	17,958	6–1–0

=== Regular season ===
The regular season schedule was released on June 21, 2018.

2018–19 game log

October: 5–6–1 (Home: 3–2–1; Road: 2–4–0)
#	Date	Visitor	Score	Home	OT	Decision	Attendance	Record	Pts	Recap
1	October 4	Philadelphia	5–2	Vegas		Fleury	18,555	0–1–0	0
2	October 6	Vegas	2–1	Minnesota	SO	Fleury	19,077	1–1–0	2
3	October 8	Vegas	2–4	Buffalo		Fleury	16,004	1–2–0	2
4	October 10	Vegas	2–5	Washington		Fleury	18,506	1–3–0	2
5	October 11	Vegas	2–4	Pittsburgh		Subban	18,610	1–4–0	2
6	October 13	Vegas	1–0	Philadelphia		Fleury	19,067	2–4–0	4
7	October 16	Buffalo	1–4	Vegas		Fleury	18,321	3–4–0	6
8	October 20	Anaheim	1–3	Vegas		Fleury	18,375	4–4–0	8
9	October 24	Vancouver	3–2	Vegas	SO	Fleury	18,189	4–4–1	9
10	October 26	Tampa Bay	3–2	Vegas		Fleury	18,207	4–5–1	9
11	October 28	Ottawa	3–4	Vegas	OT	Fleury	18,089	5–5–1	11
12	October 30	Vegas	1–4	Nashville		Subban	17,367	5–6–1	11

November: 9–6–0 (Home: 4–1–0; Road: 5–5–0)
#	Date	Visitor	Score	Home	OT	Decision	Attendance	Record	Pts	Recap
13	November 1	Vegas	3–5	St. Louis		Fleury	16,813	5–7–1	11
14	November 3	Carolina	0–3	Vegas		Fleury	18,328	6–7–1	13
15	November 6	Vegas	1–3	Toronto		Fleury	19,045	6–8–1	13
16	November 8	Vegas	5–3	Ottawa		Fleury	15,213	7–8–1	15
17	November 10	Vegas	4–5	Montreal		Fleury	21,302	7–9–1	15
18	November 11	Vegas	1–4	Boston		Subban	17,565	7–10–1	15
19	November 14	Anaheim	0–5	Vegas		Fleury	18,111	8–10–1	17
20	November 16	St. Louis	4–1	Vegas		Fleury	18,488	8–11–1	17
21	November 18	Vegas	6–3	Edmonton		Fleury	18,347	9–11–1	19
22	November 19	Vegas	2–7	Calgary		Subban	17,635	9–12–1	19
23	November 21	Vegas	3–2	Arizona	OT	Fleury	14,151	10–12–1	21
24	November 23	Calgary	0–2	Vegas		Fleury	18,206	11–12–1	23
25	November 24	San Jose	0–6	Vegas		Fleury	18,252	12–12–1	25
26	November 27	Vegas	8–3	Chicago		Fleury	21,460	13–12–1	27
27	November 29	Vegas	4–3	Vancouver		Fleury	16,880	14–12–1	29

December: 9–3–3 (Home: 5–0–2; Road: 4–3–1)
#	Date	Visitor	Score	Home	OT	Decision	Attendance	Record	Pts	Recap
28	December 1	Vegas	1–2	Edmonton		Fleury	18,347	14–13–1	29
29	December 4	Washington	3–5	Vegas		Fleury	18,125	15–13–1	31
30	December 6	Chicago	3–4	Vegas		Fleury	18,494	16–13–1	33
31	December 8	Vegas	1–5	Los Angeles		Fleury	17,631	16–14–1	33
32	December 9	Dallas	2–4	Vegas		Fleury	18,240	17–14–1	35
33	December 12	Vegas	3–2	NY Islanders		Fleury	9,182	18–14–1	37
34	December 14	Vegas	4–5	New Jersey	OT	Fleury	14,076	18–14–2	38
35	December 16	Vegas	4–3	NY Rangers	OT	Fleury	17,660	19–14–2	40
36	December 17	Vegas	0–1	Columbus		Subban	15,008	19–15–2	40
37	December 20	NY Islanders	2–4	Vegas		Fleury	18,226	20–15–2	42
38	December 22	Montreal	4–3	Vegas	OT	Fleury	18,173	20–15–3	43
39	December 23	Los Angeles	4–3	Vegas	OT	Fleury	18,225	20–15–4	44
40	December 27	Colorado	1–2	Vegas		Fleury	18,505	21–15–4	46
41	December 29	Vegas	4–1	Los Angeles		Subban	18,230	22–15–4	48
42	December 30	Vegas	5–1	Arizona		Fleury	17,125	23–15–4	50

January: 6–4–0 (Home: 4–3–0; Road: 2–1–0)
#	Date	Visitor	Score	Home	OT	Decision	Attendance	Record	Pts	Recap
43	January 1	Los Angeles	0–2	Vegas		Fleury	18,319	24–15–4	52
44	January 4	Vegas	3–2	Anaheim		Fleury	17,222	25–15–4	54
45	January 6	New Jersey	2–3	Vegas		Subban	18,103	26–15–4	56
46	January 8	NY Rangers	2–4	Vegas		Fleury	18,249	27–15–4	58
47	January 10	San Jose	3–2	Vegas		Fleury	18,367	27–16–4	58
48	January 12	Vegas	4–3	Chicago	OT	Fleury	21,760	28–16–4	60
49	January 15	Vegas	1–4	Winnipeg		Fleury	15,321	28–17–4	60
50	January 19	Pittsburgh	3–7	Vegas		Fleury	18,511	29–17–4	62
51	January 21	Minnesota	4–2	Vegas		Fleury	18,328	29–18–4	62
52	January 23	Nashville	2–1	Vegas		Fleury	18,477	29–19–4	62

February: 5–7–1 (Home: 3–4–1; Road: 2–3–0)
#	Date	Visitor	Score	Home	OT	Decision	Attendance	Record	Pts	Recap
53	February 1	Vegas	2–5	Carolina		Lagace	17,104	29–20–4	62
54	February 2	Vegas	1–3	Florida		Fleury	15,202	29–21–4	62
55	February 5	Vegas	3–2	Tampa Bay	SO	Fleury	19,092	30–21–4	64
56	February 7	Vegas	4–3	Detroit		Fleury	18,889	31–21–4	66
57	February 9	Columbus	4–3	Vegas		Fleury	18,301	31–22–4	66
58	February 12	Arizona	5–2	Vegas		Fleury	18,212	31–23–4	66
59	February 14	Toronto	6–3	Vegas		Fleury	18,214	31–24–4	66
60	February 16	Nashville	1–5	Vegas		Subban	18,430	32–24–4	68
61	February 18	Vegas	0–3	Colorado		Subban	17,808	32–25–4	68
62	February 20	Boston	3–2	Vegas	SO	Fleury	18,222	32–25–5	69
63	February 22	Winnipeg	6–3	Vegas		Fleury	18,280	32–26–5	69
64	February 26	Dallas	1–4	Vegas		Fleury	18,261	33–26–5	71
65	February 28	Florida	5–6	Vegas	SO	Subban	18,281	34–26–5	73

March: 8–4–2 (Home: 4–1–1; Road: 4–3–1)
#	Date	Visitor	Score	Home	OT	Decision	Attendance	Record	Pts	Recap
66	March 1	Vegas	3–0	Anaheim		Fleury	16,456	35–26–5	75
67	March 3	Vancouver	0–3	Vegas		Fleury	18,303	36–26–5	77
68	March 6	Calgary	1–2	Vegas		Fleury	18,422	37–26–5	79
69	March 9	Vegas	6–2	Vancouver		Fleury	18,286	38–26–5	81
70	March 10	Vegas	3–6	Calgary		Subban	19,086	38–27–5	81
71	March 15	Vegas	2–1	Dallas		Fleury	18,532	39–27–5	83
72	March 17	Edmonton	3–6	Vegas		Subban	18,317	40–27–5	85
73	March 18	Vegas	7–3	San Jose		Subban	17,487	41–27–5	87
74	March 21	Winnipeg	0–5	Vegas		Subban	18,430	42–27–5	89
75	March 23	Detroit	3–2	Vegas	OT	Subban	18,437	42–27–6	90
76	March 25	Vegas	1–3	St. Louis		Subban	18,247	42–28–6	90
77	March 27	Vegas	3–4	Colorado		Subban	16,799	42–29–6	90
78	March 29	Minnesota	3–2	Vegas		Subban	18,492	42–30–6	90
79	March 30	Vegas	3–4	San Jose	OT	Subban	17,562	42–30–7	91

April: 1–2–0 (Home: 1–1–0; Road: 0–1–0)
#	Date	Visitor	Score	Home	OT	Decision	Attendance	Record	Pts	Recap
80	April 1	Edmonton	1–3	Vegas		Subban	18,367	43–30–7	93
81	April 4	Arizona	4–1	Vegas		Fleury	18,485	43–31–7	93
82	April 6	Vegas	2–5	Los Angeles		Fleury	18,230	43–32–7	93

Legend: Win (2 points) Loss (0 points) Overtime/shootout loss (1 point)

=== Playoffs ===
The Golden Knights faced the San Jose Sharks in the first round of the playoffs, and were defeated in seven games. They played against each other in the 2018 Stanley Cup playoffs, where the Golden Knights defeated the Sharks in the second round in six games.

2019 Stanley Cup playoffs

Western Conference First Round vs. (P2) San Jose Sharks: San Jose won 4–3
#	Date	Visitor	Score	Home	OT	Decision	Attendance	Series	Recap
1	April 10	Vegas	2–5	San Jose		Fleury	17,562	0–1
2	April 12	Vegas	5–3	San Jose		Fleury	17,562	1–1
3	April 14	San Jose	3–6	Vegas		Fleury	18,461	2–1
4	April 16	San Jose	0–5	Vegas		Fleury	18,567	3–1
5	April 18	Vegas	2–5	San Jose		Fleury	17,562	3–2
6	April 21	San Jose	2–1	Vegas	2OT	Fleury	18,458	3–3
7	April 23	Vegas	4–5	San Jose	OT	Fleury	17,562	3–4

Legend: Win Loss

== Player statistics ==
Final

=== Skaters ===
Regular season
Player	GP	G	A	Pts	+/−	PIM
Jonathan Marchessault	82	25	34	59	+2	52
William Karlsson	82	24	32	56	+1	16
Reilly Smith	74	19	34	53	+13	14
Alex Tuch	74	20	32	52	+13	8
Paul Stastny	50	13	29	42	+14	30
Cody Eakin	78	22	19	41	+19	16
Max Pacioretty	66	22	18	40	−13	36
Shea Theodore	79	12	25	37	−4	20
Nate Schmidt	61	9	21	30	+22	8
Colin Miller	65	3	26	29	0	44
Ryan Reaves	80	9	11	20	+1	74
Brandon Pirri	31	12	6	18	+7	6
Ryan Carpenter	68	5	13	18	−6	8
Tomas Nosek	68	8	9	17	−10	18
Brayden McNabb	81	4	12	16	+11	52
Pierre-Edouard Bellemare	76	6	9	15	+2	6
Jon Merrill	57	3	12	15	+16	53
Nick Holden	61	3	12	15	+5	14
Oscar Lindberg^{‡}	35	4	8	12	+3	24
Deryk Engelland	74	2	10	12	−3	18
Mark Stone^{†}	18	5	6	11	+4	5
William Carrier	54	8	1	9	−4	29
Brad Hunt^{‡}	13	2	5	7	+3	2
Erik Haula	15	2	5	7	+1	10
Tomas Hyka	17	1	3	4	−2	2
Valentin Zykov^{†}	10	2	0	2	−3	0
Daniel Carr	6	1	0	1	−1	0
Jimmy Schuldt	1	0	1	1	−1	0

Playoffs
Player	GP	G	A	Pts	+/-	PIM
Mark Stone	7	6	6	12	+2	2
Max Pacioretty	7	5	6	11	+1	4
Paul Stastny	7	2	6	8	+2	2
Shea Theodore	7	1	7	8	+1	6
Jonathan Marchessault	7	4	2	6	+1	6
Reilly Smith	7	1	5	6	+1	0
William Karlsson	7	2	3	5	+1	2
Nate Schmidt	7	0	4	4	+2	2
Colin Miller	6	1	2	3	+1	6
Cody Eakin	7	2	0	2	+1	17
Alex Tuch	7	1	1	2	0	8
Brayden McNabb	7	0	1	1	+4	8
Deryk Engelland	7	0	1	1	+2	8
Nick Holden	1	0	0	0	−2	2
Brandon Pirri	1	0	0	0	0	0
Pierre-Edouard Bellemare	6	0	0	0	0	2
William Carrier	7	0	0	0	−1	6
Ryan Reaves	7	0	0	0	−1	17
Tomas Nosek	7	0	0	0	−3	14
Jon Merrill	7	0	0	0	−1	0

=== Goaltenders ===
Regular season
Player	GP	GS	TOI	W	L	OT	GA	GAA	SA	SV%	SO	G	A	PIM
Marc-Andre Fleury	61	61	3,635	35	21	5	152	2.51	1745	.913	8	0	2	4
Malcolm Subban	21	20	1,227	8	10	2	60	2.93	612	.902	1	0	0	4
Maxime Lagace	1	1	60	0	1	0	4	4.03	31	.871	0	0	0	0

Playoffs
Player	GP	GS	TOI	W	L	GA	GAA	SA	SV%	SO	G	A	PIM
Marc-Andre Fleury	7	7	466:32	3	4	21	2.70	230	.909	1	0	0	0

^{†}Denotes player spent time with another team before joining the Golden Knights. Stats reflect time with the Golden Knights only.
^{‡}Denotes player was traded mid-season. Stats reflect time with the Golden Knights only.
Bold/italics denotes franchise record.

== Transactions ==
The Golden Knights have been involved in the following transactions during the 2018–19 season.

=== Trades ===
Date	Details		Ref
June 23, 2018	To Pittsburgh Penguins 7th-round pick in 2019	To Vegas Golden Knights 7th-round pick in 2018	
September 10, 2018	To Montreal Canadiens Tomas Tatar; Nick Suzuki; 2nd-round pick in 2019	To Vegas Golden Knights Max Pacioretty	
January 3, 2019	To Winnipeg Jets Jimmy Oligny	To Vegas Golden Knights Future considerations	
January 21, 2019	To Minnesota Wild Brad Hunt; 6th-round pick in 2019	To Vegas Golden Knights Conditional 5th-round pick in 2019	
February 25, 2019	To Ottawa Senators Erik Brannstrom; Oscar Lindberg; DAL's 2nd-round pick in 2020	To Vegas Golden Knights Tobias Lindberg; Mark Stone	

=== Free agents ===
Date	Player	Team	Contract term	Ref
July 1, 2018	Daniel Carr	from Montreal Canadiens	1-year	
July 1, 2018	Zach Fucale	from Montreal Canadiens	1-year	
July 1, 2018	Alex Gallant	from Tampa Bay Lightning	1-year	
July 1, 2018	Nick Holden	from Boston Bruins	2-year	
July 1, 2018	Curtis McKenzie	from Dallas Stars	2-year	
July 1, 2018	Jimmy Oligny	from Milwaukee Admirals (AHL)	1-year	
July 1, 2018	David Perron	to St. Louis Blues	4-year	
July 1, 2018	Paul Stastny	from Winnipeg Jets	3-year	
July 2, 2018	James Neal	to Calgary Flames	5-year	
July 2, 2018	Paul Thompson	to Florida Panthers	2-year	
July 16, 2018	Philip Holm	to Torpedo Nizhny Novgorod (KHL)	1-year	
July 18, 2018	Teemu Pulkkinen	to Dinamo Minsk (KHL)	1-year	
September 24, 2018	Luca Sbisa	to New York Islanders	1-year	
October 2, 2018	Jason Garrison	to Edmonton Oilers	1-year	
April 3, 2019	Jimmy Schuldt	from St. Cloud State Huskies (NCHC)	1-year	

=== Waivers ===
Date	Player	Team	Ref
December 29, 2018	Valentin Zykov	from Edmonton Oilers	

=== Contract terminations ===
Date	Player	Via	Ref

=== Retirement ===
Date	Player	Ref

=== Signings ===
Date	Player	Contract term	Ref
July 1, 2018	Maxime Lagace	1-year	
July 1, 2018	Brandon Pirri	1-year	
July 1, 2018	Ryan Reaves	2-year	
July 6, 2018	Oscar Dansk	2-year	
July 7, 2018	Colin Miller	4-year	
July 13, 2018	Marc-Andre Fleury	3-year	
July 18, 2018	Tomas Nosek	1-year	
July 23, 2018	William Carrier	2-year	
August 4, 2018	William Karlsson	1-year	
September 10, 2018	Max Pacioretty	4-year	
September 24, 2018	Shea Theodore	7-year	
October 19, 2018	Alex Tuch	7-year	
October 25, 2018	Nate Schmidt	6-year	
December 28, 2018	Paul Cotter	3-year	
March 8, 2019	Mark Stone	8-year	
April 14, 2019	Nikita Gusev	1-year	
May 30, 2019	Jonas Rondbjerg	3-year	

=== Milestones ===
- On March 22, 2019, Malcolm Subban recorded his 1st career NHL shutout against the Jets

== Draft picks ==
Below are the Vegas Golden Knights' selections at the 2018 NHL entry draft, which was held on June 22 and 23, 2018, at the American Airlines Center in Dallas, Texas.

Round	#	Player	Pos	Nationality	College/Junior/Club team (League)
2	61	Ivan Morozov	C	Russia	Mamonty Yugry (MHL)
4	99^{1}	Slava Demin	D	United States	Wenatchee Wild (BCHL)
4	115^{2}	Paul Cotter	C	United States	Lincoln Stars (USHL)
5	135^{3}	Brandon Kruse	LW	United States	Bowling Green State University (WCHA)
5	154	Connor Corcoran	D	Canada	Windsor Spitfires (OHL)
6	180^{4}	Peter Diliberatore	D	Canada	Salisbury School (USHS)
6	185	Xavier Bouchard	D	Canada	Baie-Comeau Drakkar (QMJHL)
7	208^{5}	Jordan Kooy	G	Canada	London Knights (OHL)

Notes:

1. The Vancouver Canucks' fourth-round pick went to the Vegas Golden Knights as the result of a trade on February 23, 2018, that sent Derick Brassard to Pittsburgh in exchange for Ryan Reaves and this pick.
2. The Pittsburgh Penguins' fourth-round pick went to the Vegas Golden Knights as the result of a trade on June 21, 2017, that ensured Vegas would select Jason Garrison in the 2017 NHL expansion draft from Tampa Bay in exchange for Nikita Gusev, a second-round pick in 2017 and this pick.
3. The Carolina Hurricanes' fifth-round pick went to the Vegas Golden Knights as the result of a trade on July 4, 2017, that sent Marcus Kruger to Carolina in exchange for this pick.
4. The Toronto Maple Leafs' sixth-round pick went to the Vegas Golden Knights as the result of a trade on October 6, 2017, that sent Calvin Pickard to Toronto in exchange for Tobias Lindberg and this pick.
5. The Pittsburgh Penguins' seventh-round pick went to the Vegas Golden Knights as the result of a trade on June 23, 2018, that sent a seventh-round pick in 2019 to Pittsburgh in exchange for this pick.
