= 2018–19 Buffalo Sabres season =

NHL hockey team season

2018–19 Buffalo Sabres
- Division: 6th Atlantic
- Conference: 13th Eastern
- 2018–19 record: 33–39–10
- Home record: 21–15–5
- Road record: 12–24–5
- Goals for: 226
- Goals against: 271

Team information
- General manager: Jason Botterill
- Coach: Phil Housley
- Captain: Jack Eichel
- Alternate captains: Zach Bogosian; Kyle Okposo
- Arena: KeyBank Center
- Average attendance: 17,908
- Minor league affiliates: Rochester Americans (AHL); Cincinnati Cyclones (ECHL)

Team leaders
- Goals: Jeff Skinner (40)
- Assists: Jack Eichel (54)
- Points: Jack Eichel (82)
- Penalty minutes: Zach Bogosian (52)
- Plus/minus: 4 tied (+1)
- Wins: Carter Hutton (18)
- Goals against average: Carter Hutton (3.00)

The 2018–19 Buffalo Sabres season was the 49th season for the National Hockey League (NHL) franchise that was established on May 22, 1970.

After experiencing a ten-game winning streak in November that put them atop the NHL standings, the Sabres regressed sharply the rest of the season and were officially eliminated from playoff contention on March 23, 2019, after suffering a 7–4 loss to the Montreal Canadiens, joining the 2016–17 Philadelphia Flyers as the only teams in NHL history to win 10 consecutive games and be eliminated from playoff contention.

With the Carolina Hurricanes clinching a playoff berth in the 2019 Stanley Cup playoffs, the Sabres became the team with the longest active postseason appearance drought in the NHL at eight consecutive seasons, about 1.5 years after their football counterparts, the Buffalo Bills, ended what was the longest active postseason appearance drought in the NFL at 17 consecutive seasons. On April 7, 2019, the Sabres fired Phil Housley, who became the fifth head coach to be fired since the Pegulas bought the team from Tom Golisano in February 2011.

== Standings ==
Atlantic Division
Pos	Team	GP	W	L	OTL	ROW	GF	GA	GD	Pts
1	p – Tampa Bay Lightning	82	62	16	4	56	325	222	+103	128
2	x – Boston Bruins	82	49	24	9	47	259	215	+44	107
3	x – Toronto Maple Leafs	82	46	28	8	46	286	251	+35	100
4	Montreal Canadiens	82	44	30	8	41	249	236	+13	96
5	Florida Panthers	82	36	32	14	33	267	280	−13	86
6	Buffalo Sabres	82	33	39	10	28	226	271	−45	76
7	Detroit Red Wings	82	32	40	10	29	227	277	−50	74
8	Ottawa Senators	82	29	47	6	29	242	302	−60	64

Source: National Hockey League
p – Clinched Presidents' Trophy; x – Clinched playoff spot

Eastern Conference Wild Card
Pos	Div	Team	GP	W	L	OTL	ROW	GF	GA	GD	Pts
1	ME	x – Carolina Hurricanes	82	46	29	7	44	245	223	+22	99
2	ME	x – Columbus Blue Jackets	82	47	31	4	45	258	232	+26	98
3	AT	Montreal Canadiens	82	44	30	8	41	249	236	+13	96
4	AT	Florida Panthers	82	36	32	14	33	267	280	−13	86
5	ME	Philadelphia Flyers	82	37	37	8	34	244	281	−37	82
6	ME	New York Rangers	82	32	36	14	26	227	272	−45	78
7	AT	Buffalo Sabres	82	33	39	10	28	226	271	−45	76
8	AT	Detroit Red Wings	82	32	40	10	29	227	277	−50	74
9	ME	New Jersey Devils	82	31	41	10	28	222	275	−53	72
10	AT	Ottawa Senators	82	29	47	6	29	242	302	−60	64

Source: National Hockey League
x – Clinched playoff spot

== Schedule and results ==
=== Preseason ===
The preseason schedule was published on June 15, 2018.

2018 preseason game log: 3–4–0 (Home: 1–2–0; Road: 2–2–0)
#	Date	Visitor	Score	Home	OT	Decision	Attendance	Record	Recap
1	September 17	Buffalo	4–1	Columbus		Ullmark	9,845	1–0–0	Recap
2	September 18	Pittsburgh	2–3	Buffalo		Hutton	15,602	2–0–0	Recap
3	September 21	Buffalo	3–5	Toronto		Ullmark	18,833	2–1–0	Recap
4	September 22	Toronto	3–2	Buffalo		Hutton	17,624	2–2–0	Recap
5^{[a]}	September 25	Columbus	4–2	Buffalo		Wedgewood	–	2–3–0	Recap
6	September 26	Buffalo	1–5	Pittsburgh		Ullmark	16,516	2–4–0	Recap
7^{[b]}	September 28	Buffalo	5–4	NY Islanders		Hutton	–	3–4–0	Recap
Notes:^{a} Game was played at Clinton Arena in Clinton, New York.^{b} Game was played at Tribute Communities Centre in Oshawa, Ontario.

=== Regular season ===
The regular season schedule was released on June 21, 2018.

2018–19 game log

October: 6–4–2 (Home: 3–2–1; Road: 3–2–1)
#	Date	Visitor	Score	Home	OT	Decision	Attendance	Record	Pts	Recap
1	October 4	Boston	4–0	Buffalo		Hutton	19,070	0–1–0	0	Recap
2	October 6	NY Rangers	1–3	Buffalo		Hutton	16,824	1–1–0	2	Recap
3	October 8	Vegas	2–4	Buffalo		Hutton	16,004	2–1–0	4	Recap
4	October 11	Colorado	6–1	Buffalo		Hutton	15,396	2–2–0	4	Recap
5	October 13	Buffalo	3–0	Arizona		Ullmark	15,304	3–2–0	6	Recap
6	October 16	Buffalo	1–4	Vegas		Hutton	18,321	3–3–0	6	Recap
7	October 18	Buffalo	1–5	San Jose		Hutton	17,389	3–4–0	6	Recap
8	October 20	Buffalo	5–1	Los Angeles		Ullmark	18,230	4–4–0	8	Recap
9	October 21	Buffalo	4–2	Anaheim		Hutton	17,174	5–4–0	10	Recap
10	October 25	Montreal	3–4	Buffalo		Hutton	16,112	6–4–0	12	Recap
11	October 27	Buffalo	4–5	Columbus	OT	Ullmark	15,642	6–4–1	13	Recap
12	October 30	Calgary	2–1	Buffalo	OT	Hutton	15,196	6–4–2	14	Recap

November: 11–3–1 (Home: 6–0–0; Road: 5–3–1)
#	Date	Visitor	Score	Home	OT	Decision	Attendance	Record	Pts	Recap
13	November 1	Buffalo	2–4	Ottawa		Hutton	12,587	6–5–2	14	Recap
14	November 3	Ottawa	2–9	Buffalo		Ullmark	17,881	7–5–2	16	Recap
15	November 4	Buffalo	1–3	NY Rangers		Hutton	16,904	7–6–2	16	Recap
16	November 8	Buffalo	6–5	Montreal	OT	Hutton	20,488	8–6–2	18	Recap
17	November 10	Vancouver	3–4	Buffalo	SO	Hutton	17,541	9–6–2	20	Recap
18	November 13	Tampa Bay	1–2	Buffalo		Hutton	15,833	10–6–2	22	Recap
19	November 16	Buffalo	2–1	Winnipeg	SO	Hutton	15,321	11–6–2	24	Recap
20	November 17	Buffalo	3–2	Minnesota		Ullmark	18,947	12–6–2	26	Recap
21	November 19	Buffalo	5–4	Pittsburgh	OT	Hutton	18,618	13–6–2	28	Recap
22	November 21	Philadelphia	2–5	Buffalo		Hutton	19,070	14–6–2	30	Recap
23	November 23	Montreal	2–3	Buffalo	OT	Hutton	19,070	15–6–2	32	Recap
24	November 24	Buffalo	3–2	Detroit	SO	Ullmark	19,515	16–6–2	34	Recap
25	November 27	San Jose	2–3	Buffalo	OT	Hutton	19,070	17–6–2	36	Recap
26	November 29	Buffalo	4–5	Tampa Bay		Hutton	19,092	17–7–2	36	Recap
27	November 30	Buffalo	2–3	Florida	OT	Ullmark	12,179	17–7–3	37	Recap

December: 4–6–3 (Home: 3–3–2; Road: 1–3–1)
#	Date	Visitor	Score	Home	OT	Decision	Attendance	Record	Pts	Recap
28	December 3	Buffalo	1–2	Nashville		Hutton	17,311	17–8–3	37	Recap
29	December 4	Toronto	4–3	Buffalo	OT	Ullmark	19,070	17–8–4	38	Recap
30	December 8	Philadelphia	6–2	Buffalo		Ullmark	18,283	17–9–4	38	Recap
31	December 11	Los Angeles	3–4	Buffalo	OT	Ullmark	17,897	18–9–4	40	Recap
32	December 13	Arizona	1–3	Buffalo		Hutton	16,872	19–9–4	42	Recap
33	December 15	Buffalo	3–4	Washington	SO	Hutton	18,506	19–9–5	43	Recap
34	December 16	Buffalo	4–2	Boston		Ullmark	17,565	20–9–5	45	Recap
35	December 18	Florida	5–2	Buffalo		Hutton	17,602	20–10–5	45	Recap
36	December 21	Buffalo	1–2	Washington		Hutton	18,506	20–11–5	45	Recap
37	December 22	Anaheim	0–3	Buffalo		Ullmark	19,070	21–11–5	47	Recap
38	December 27	Buffalo	1–4	St. Louis		Hutton	17,867	21–12–5	47	Recap
39	December 29	Boston	3–2	Buffalo	OT	Hutton	19,070	21–12–6	48	Recap
40	December 31	NY Islanders	3–1	Buffalo		Hutton	19,070	21–13–6	48	Recap

January: 4–6–0 (Home: 2–1–0; Road: 2–5–0)
#	Date	Visitor	Score	Home	OT	Decision	Attendance	Record	Pts	Recap
41	January 3	Florida	3–4	Buffalo		Ullmark	18,551	22–13–6	50	Recap
42	January 5	Buffalo	1–2	Boston		Ullmark	17,565	22–14–6	50	Recap
43	January 8	New Jersey	1–5	Buffalo		Hutton	18,212	23–14–6	52	Recap
44	January 11	Buffalo	3–4	Carolina		Hutton	17,199	23–15–6	52	Recap
45	January 12	Tampa Bay	5–3	Buffalo		Ullmark	19,070	23–16–6	52	Recap
46	January 14	Buffalo	2–7	Edmonton		Hutton	18,347	23–17–6	52	Recap
47	January 16	Buffalo	4–3	Calgary	OT	Ullmark	18,286	24–17–6	54	Recap
48	January 18	Buffalo	3–4	Vancouver		Ullmark	18,176	24–18–6	54	Recap
49	January 29	Buffalo	5–4	Columbus		Hutton	15,615	25–18–6	56	Recap
50	January 30	Buffalo	0–1	Dallas		Ullmark	17,986	25–19–6	56	Recap

February: 4–7–2 (Home: 4–3–1; Road: 0–4–1)
#	Date	Visitor	Score	Home	OT	Decision	Attendance	Record	Pts	Recap
51	February 1	Chicago	7–3	Buffalo		Hutton	18,205	25–20–6	56	Recap
52	February 5	Minnesota	4–5	Buffalo	SO	Ullmark	16,847	26–20–6	58	Recap
53	February 7	Carolina	6–5	Buffalo	OT	Ullmark	17,588	26–20–7	59	Recap
54	February 9	Detroit	1–3	Buffalo		Ullmark	19,070	27–20–7	61	Recap
55	February 10	Winnipeg	3–1	Buffalo		Hutton	17,966	27–21–7	61	Recap
56	February 12	NY Islanders	1–3	Buffalo		Ullmark	16,894	28–21–7	63	Recap
57	February 15	NY Rangers	6–2	Buffalo		Ullmark	19,070	28–22–7	63	Recap
58	February 17	Buffalo	1–4	New Jersey		Hutton	16,514	28–23–7	63	Recap
59	February 19	Buffalo	2–4	Florida		Ullmark	10,340	28–24–7	63	Recap
60	February 21	Buffalo	1–2	Tampa Bay	SO	Hutton	19,092	28–24–8	64	Recap
61	February 23	Washington	2–5	Buffalo		Hutton	19,070	29–24–8	66	Recap
62	February 25	Buffalo	3–5	Toronto		Ullmark	19,026	29–25–8	66	Recap
63	February 26	Buffalo	2–5	Philadelphia		Hutton	18,466	29–26–8	66	Recap

March: 2–12–2 (Home: 2–5–1; Road: 0–7–1)
#	Date	Visitor	Score	Home	OT	Decision	Attendance	Record	Pts	Recap
64	March 1	Pittsburgh	3–4	Buffalo	OT	Ullmark	19,070	30–26–8	68	Recap
65	March 2	Buffalo	2–5	Toronto		Ullmark	19,088	30–27–8	68	Recap
66	March 4	Edmonton	4–3	Buffalo		Ullmark	17,775	30–28–8	68	Recap
67	March 7	Buffalo	4–5	Chicago	SO	Hutton	21,500	30–28–9	69	Recap
68	March 9	Buffalo	0–3	Colorado		Hutton	18,052	30–29–9	69	Recap
69	March 12	Dallas	2–0	Buffalo		Ullmark	17,830	30–30–9	69	Recap
70	March 14	Pittsburgh	5–0	Buffalo		Hutton	18,680	30–31–9	69	Recap
71	March 16	Buffalo	2–4	Carolina		Ullmark	15,171	30–32–9	69	Recap
72	March 17	St. Louis	3–4	Buffalo	SO	Hutton	18,486	31–32–9	71	Recap
73	March 20	Toronto	4–2	Buffalo		Hutton	19,070	31–33–9	71	Recap
74	March 23	Buffalo	4–7	Montreal		Hutton	21,302	31–34–9	71	Recap
75	March 25	Buffalo	1–3	New Jersey		Ullmark	12,053	31–35–9	71	Recap
76	March 26	Buffalo	0–4	Ottawa		Hutton	12,074	31–36–9	71	Recap
77	March 28	Detroit	5–4	Buffalo	OT	Ullmark	16,236	31–36–10	72	Recap
78	March 30	Buffalo	1–5	NY Islanders		Hutton	13,917	31–37–10	72	Recap
79	March 31	Columbus	4–0	Buffalo		Ullmark	17,990	31–38–10	72	Recap

April: 2–1–0 (Home: 1–1–0; Road: 1–0–0)
#	Date	Visitor	Score	Home	OT	Decision	Attendance	Record	Pts	Recap
80	April 2	Nashville	3–2	Buffalo		Hutton	16,569	31–39–10	72	Recap
81	April 4	Ottawa	2–5	Buffalo		Hutton	17,998	32–39–10	74	Recap
82	April 6	Buffalo	7–1	Detroit		Ullmark	19,515	33–39–10	76	Recap

Legend: Win (2 points) Loss (0 points) Overtime/shootout loss (1 point)

== Player statistics ==
As of April 6, 2019

=== Skaters ===
Regular season
Player	GP	G	A	Pts	+/−	PIM
Jack Eichel	77	28	54	82	−11	26
Sam Reinhart	82	22	43	65	−10	16
Jeff Skinner	82	40	23	63	0	36
Rasmus Dahlin	82	9	35	44	−13	34
Rasmus Ristolainen	78	5	38	43	−41	38
Conor Sheary	78	14	20	34	−18	12
Jason Pominville	73	16	15	31	−4	4
Kyle Okposo	78	14	15	29	−9	41
Evan Rodrigues	74	9	20	29	−7	25
Casey Mittelstadt	77	12	13	25	−19	10
Zach Bogosian	65	3	16	19	−5	52
Zemgus Girgensons	72	5	13	18	−11	17
Johan Larsson	73	6	8	14	−8	37
Jake McCabe	59	4	10	14	−4	35
Marco Scandella	63	6	7	13	−13	26
Vladimir Sobotka	69	5	8	13	−20	26
Tage Thompson	65	7	5	12	−22	20
Brandon Montour^{†}	20	3	7	10	−4	16
Nathan Beaulieu^{‡}	30	3	4	7	+1	32
Lawrence Pilut	33	1	5	6	−8	20
Casey Nelson	38	1	5	6	+1	13
Victor Olofsson	6	2	2	4	+1	2
Alexander Nylander	12	2	2	4	−4	4
Patrik Berglund	23	2	2	4	−5	6
Scott Wilson	15	0	3	3	−8	4
C. J. Smith	11	2	0	2	0	0
Matt Hunwick	14	0	2	2	−7	4
Remi Elie	16	0	1	1	−3	2
Danny O'Regan	1	0	0	0	0	0
Brendan Guhle^{‡}	2	0	0	0	+1	2
William Borgen	4	0	0	0	−5	0
Matt Tennyson	4	0	0	0	−4	0

=== Goaltenders ===
Regular season
Player	GP	GS	TOI	W	L	OT	GA	GAA	SA	SV%	SO	G	A	PIM
Carter Hutton	50	48	2,839	18	25	5	142	3.00	1541	.908	0	0	1	2
Linus Ullmark	37	34	2,102	15	14	5	109	3.11	1146	.905	2	0	1	0

^{†}Denotes player spent time with another team before joining the Sabres. Stats reflect time with the Sabres only.
^{‡}Denotes player was traded mid-season. Stats reflect time with the Sabres only.
Bold/italics denotes franchise record.

== Transactions ==
The Sabres have been involved in the following transactions during the 2018–19 season.

=== Trades ===
Date	Details		Ref
June 23, 2018	To Toronto Maple Leafs 6th-round pick in 2018	To Buffalo Sabres 6th-round pick in 2019	
June 27, 2018	To Pittsburgh Penguins Conditional 4th-round pick in 2019	To Buffalo Sabres Conor Sheary; Matt Hunwick	
July 1, 2018	To St. Louis Blues Ryan O'Reilly	To Buffalo Sabres Patrik Berglund; Vladimir Sobotka; Tage Thompson; 1st-round pick in 2019; 2nd-round pick in 2021	
August 2, 2018	To Carolina Hurricanes Cliff Pu; 2nd-round pick in 2019; 3rd-round pick in 2020; 6th-round pick in 2020	To Buffalo Sabres Jeff Skinner	
October 1, 2018	To Nashville Predators Nicholas Baptiste	To Buffalo Sabres Jack Dougherty	
November 10, 2018	To Dallas Stars Taylor Fedun	To Buffalo Sabres Conditional 7th-round pick in 2020	
January 17, 2019	To Philadelphia Flyers Justin Bailey	To Buffalo Sabres Taylor Leier	
February 24, 2019	To Anaheim Ducks Brendan Guhle; Conditional 1st-round pick in 2019	To Buffalo Sabres Brandon Montour	
February 25, 2019	To Winnipeg Jets Nathan Beaulieu	To Buffalo Sabres 6th-round pick in 2019	

=== Free agents ===
Date	Player	Team	Contract term	Ref
June 26, 2018	Adam Wilcox	to Rochester Americans (AHL)	1-year	
July 1, 2018	Seth Griffith	to Winnipeg Jets	1-year	
July 1, 2018	Carter Hutton	from St. Louis Blues	3-year	
July 1, 2018	Chad Johnson	to St. Louis Blues	1-year	
July 1, 2018	Scott Wedgewood	from Los Angeles Kings	1-year	
July 2, 2018	Viktor Antipin	to Metallurg Magnitogorsk (KHL)	3-year	
July 2, 2018	Mike Sislo	to New York Islanders	1-year	
July 5, 2018	Jordan Nolan	to St. Louis Blues	1-year	
February 24, 2019	Adam Wilcox	from Rochester Americans (AHL)	1-year	
May 8, 2019	Arttu Ruotsalainen	from Ilves (Liiga)	3-year	

=== Waivers ===
Date	Player	Team	Ref
October 2, 2018	Remi Elie	from Dallas Stars	

=== Contract terminations ===
Date	Player	Via	Ref
September 20, 2018	Vaclav Karabacek	Mutual termination	
December 20, 2018	Patrik Berglund	Mutual termination	

=== Retirement ===
Date	Player	Ref

=== Signings ===
Date	Player	Contract term	Ref
July 1, 2018	Brandon Hickey	2-year	
July 1, 2018	Scott Wilson	2-year	
July 9, 2018	Rasmus Dahlin	3-year	
July 12, 2018	Sean Malone	1-year	
July 15, 2018	Justin Bailey	1-year	
July 15, 2018	Nicholas Baptiste	1-year	
July 15, 2018	Danny O'Regan	1-year	
July 16, 2018	C. J. Smith	1-year	
September 19, 2018	Sam Reinhart	2-year	
October 17, 2018	Matej Pekar	3-year	
March 26, 2019	Casey Fitzgerald	2-year	
April 15, 2019	Jacob Bryson	3-year	
June 7, 2019	Jeff Skinner	8-year	

== Draft picks ==
Below are the Buffalo Sabres' selections at the 2018 NHL entry draft, which was held on June 22 and 23, 2018, at the American Airlines Center in Dallas, Texas.

Round	#	Player	Pos	Nationality	College/Junior/Club team (League)
1	1	Rasmus Dahlin	D	Sweden	Frolunda HC (SHL)
2	32	Mattias Samuelsson	D	United States	U.S. NTDP (USHL)
4	94	Matej Pekar	C	Czech Republic	Muskegon Lumberjacks (USHL)
4	117^{1}	Linus Lindstrand Cronholm	D	Sweden	Malmo Redhawks J20 (SuperElit)
5	125	Miska Kukkonen	D	Finland	Ilves U20 (Nuorten SM-liiga)
7	187	William Worge Kreu	D	Sweden	Linkopings HC J20 (SuperElit)

Notes:

1. The Minnesota Wild's fourth-round pick went to the Buffalo Sabres as the result of a trade on June 30, 2017 that sent Tyler Ennis, Marcus Foligno and a third-round pick to Minnesota in exchange for Jason Pominville, Marco Scandella and this pick.
