= 2018–19 Colorado Avalanche season =

Season of play of professional ice hockey team

2018–19 Colorado Avalanche
- Division: 5th Central
- Conference: 8th Western
- 2018–19 record: 38–30–14
- Home record: 21–14–6
- Road record: 17–16–8
- Goals for: 260
- Goals against: 246

Team information
- General manager: Joe Sakic
- Coach: Jared Bednar
- Captain: Gabriel Landeskog
- Alternate captains: Erik Johnson; Nathan MacKinnon
- Arena: Pepsi Center
- Average attendance: 17,132
- Minor league affiliates: Colorado Eagles (AHL); Utah Grizzlies (ECHL)

Team leaders
- Goals: Nathan MacKinnon (41)
- Assists: Nathan MacKinnon (58)
- Points: Nathan MacKinnon (99)
- Penalty minutes: Ian Cole (115)
- Plus/minus: Nathan MacKinnon (+20)
- Wins: Semyon Varlamov (20)
- Goals against average: Pavel Francouz (1.96)

The 2018–19 Colorado Avalanche season was the 24th operational season and 23rd playing season since the franchise relocated from Quebec prior to the start of the 1995–96 NHL season. As well as the franchise's 40th season in the National Hockey League and 47th season overall.

On April 4, 2019, the Avalanche clinched a playoff spot after a 3–2 overtime win against the Winnipeg Jets. In the playoffs, the Avalanche defeated the Calgary Flames 4–1 in the first round to secure their first playoff series win since 2008. Their season, however, would come to an end after losing to the San Jose Sharks in seven games in the second round.

== Standings ==
Central Division
Pos	Team	GP	W	L	OTL	ROW	GF	GA	GD	Pts
1	y – Nashville Predators	82	47	29	6	43	240	214	+26	100
2	x – Winnipeg Jets	82	47	30	5	45	272	244	+28	99
3	x – St. Louis Blues	82	45	28	9	42	247	223	+24	99
4	x – Dallas Stars	82	43	32	7	42	210	202	+8	93
5	x – Colorado Avalanche	82	38	30	14	36	260	246	+14	90
6	Chicago Blackhawks	82	36	34	12	33	270	292	−22	84
7	Minnesota Wild	82	37	36	9	36	211	237	−26	83

Source: National Hockey League
x – Clinched playoff spot; y – Clinched division

Western Conference Wild Card
Pos	Div	Team	GP	W	L	OTL	ROW	GF	GA	GD	Pts
1	CE	x – Dallas Stars	82	43	32	7	42	210	202	+8	93
2	CE	x – Colorado Avalanche	82	38	30	14	36	260	246	+14	90
3	PA	Arizona Coyotes	82	39	35	8	35	213	223	−10	86
4	CE	Chicago Blackhawks	82	36	34	12	33	270	292	−22	84
5	CE	Minnesota Wild	82	37	36	9	36	211	237	−26	83
6	PA	Vancouver Canucks	82	35	36	11	29	225	254	−29	81
7	PA	Anaheim Ducks	82	35	37	10	32	199	251	−52	80
8	PA	Edmonton Oilers	82	35	38	9	32	232	274	−42	79
9	PA	Los Angeles Kings	82	31	42	9	28	202	263	−61	71

Source: National Hockey League
x – Clinched playoff spot

== Schedule and results ==
=== Preseason ===
The preseason schedule was published on June 13, 2018.

2018 preseason game log: 3–3–0 (Home: 2–1–0; Road: 1–2–0)
#	Date	Visitor	Score	Home	OT	Decision	Attendance	Record	Recap
1	September 18	Vegas	5–1	Colorado		Varlamov	—	0–1–0
2	September 22	Colorado	0–7	Minnesota		Grubauer	18,410	0–2–0
3	September 24	Colorado	5–3	Vegas		Francouz	17,880	1–2–0
4	September 26	Dallas	3–1	Colorado		Varlamov	—	1–3–0
5	September 28	Minnesota	3–4	Colorado	OT	Grubauer	—	2–3–0
6	September 30	Colorado	6–5	Dallas		Varlamov	12,211	3–3–0

=== Regular season ===
The regular season schedule was released on June 21, 2018.

2018–19 game log

October: 7–3–2 (Home: 3–1–1; Road: 4–2–1)
#	Date	Visitor	Score	Home	OT	Decision	Attendance	Record	Pts	Recap
1	October 4	Minnesota	1–4	Colorado		Varlamov	18,086	1–0–0	2
2	October 6	Philadelphia	2–5	Colorado		Varlamov	16,768	2–0–0	4
3	October 9	Colorado	2–5	Columbus		Grubauer	11,694	2–1–0	4
4	October 11	Colorado	6–1	Buffalo		Varlamov	15,396	3–1–0	6
5	October 13	Calgary	3–2	Colorado	OT	Varlamov	17,334	3–1–1	7
6	October 16	Colorado	2–3	NY Rangers	SO	Varlamov	17,251	3–1–2	8
7	October 18	Colorado	5–3	New Jersey		Grubauer	13,374	4–1–2	10
8	October 20	Colorado	3–1	Carolina		Grubauer	11,753	5–1–2	12
9	October 22	Colorado	4–1	Philadelphia		Varlamov	19,326	6–1–2	14
10	October 24	Tampa Bay	1–0	Colorado		Varlamov	16,753	6–2–2	14
11	October 26	Ottawa	3–6	Colorado		Grubauer	16,851	7–2–2	16
12	October 27	Colorado	2–3	Minnesota		Varlamov	19,093	7–3–2	16

November: 8–3–3 (Home: 3–1–2; Road: 5–2–1)
#	Date	Visitor	Score	Home	OT	Decision	Attendance	Record	Pts	Recap
13	November 1	Colorado	5–6	Calgary		Varlamov	17,317	7–4–2	16
14	November 2	Colorado	6–7	Vancouver	OT	Grubauer	18,334	7–4–3	17
15	November 7	Nashville	4–1	Colorado		Varlamov	16,923	7–5–3	17
16	November 9	Colorado	2–5	Winnipeg		Varlamov	15,321	7–6–3	17
17	November 11	Colorado	4–1	Edmonton		Varlamov	18,347	8–6–3	19
18	November 14	Boston	3–6	Colorado		Varlamov	16,124	9–6–3	21
19	November 16	Washington	3–2	Colorado	OT	Grubauer	18,050	9–6–4	22
20	November 18	Colorado	4–3	Anaheim	OT	Grubauer	16,502	10–6–4	24
21	November 21	Colorado	7–3	Los Angeles		Varlamov	17,840	11–6–4	26
22	November 23	Colorado	5–1	Arizona		Grubauer	12,029	12–6–4	28
23	November 24	Dallas	2–3	Colorado		Varlamov	18,010	13–6–4	30
24	November 27	Colorado	3–2	Nashville		Varlamov	17,163	14–6–4	32
25	November 28	Pittsburgh	3–6	Colorado		Grubauer	17,348	15–6–4	34
26	November 30	St. Louis	3–2	Colorado	OT	Varlamov	18,021	15–6–5	35

December: 4–7–3 (Home: 2–3–2; Road: 2–4–1)
#	Date	Visitor	Score	Home	OT	Decision	Attendance	Record	Pts	Recap
27	December 2	Colorado	2–0	Detroit		Varlamov	18,248	16–6–5	37
28	December 4	Colorado	3–6	Pittsburgh		Varlamov	18,415	16–7–5	37
29	December 6	Colorado	5–2	Florida		Grubauer	10,077	17–7–5	39
30	December 8	Colorado	1–7	Tampa Bay		Varlamov	19,092	17–8–5	39
31	December 11	Edmonton	6–4	Colorado		Grubauer	15,809	17–9–5	39
32	December 14	Colorado	3–4	St. Louis	OT	Grubauer	16,366	17–9–6	40
33	December 15	Dallas	4–6	Colorado		Varlamov	17,646	18–9–6	42
34	December 17	NY Islanders	4–1	Colorado		Varlamov	15,066	18–10–6	42
35	December 19	Montreal	1–2	Colorado		Grubauer	15,469	19–10–6	44
36	December 21	Chicago	2–1	Colorado		Grubauer	17,850	19–11–6	44
37	December 22	Colorado	4–6	Arizona		Francouz	13,896	19–12–6	44
38	December 27	Colorado	1–2	Vegas		Grubauer	18,505	19–13–6	44
39	December 29	Chicago	3–2	Colorado	OT	Varlamov	18,028	19–13–7	45
40	December 31	Los Angeles	3–2	Colorado	OT	Varlamov	18,017	19–13–8	46

January: 3–7–0 (Home: 2–3–0; Road: 1–4–0)
#	Date	Visitor	Score	Home	OT	Decision	Attendance	Record	Pts	Recap
41	January 2	San Jose	5–4	Colorado		Francouz	17,891	19–14–8	46
42	January 4	NY Rangers	1–6	Colorado		Grubauer	17,287	20–14–8	48
43	January 8	Colorado	4–7	Winnipeg		Grubauer	15,321	20–15–8	48
44	January 9	Colorado	3–5	Calgary		Varlamov	18,220	20–16–8	48
45	January 12	Colorado	0–3	Montreal		Varlamov	21,302	20–17–8	48
46	January 14	Colorado	6–3	Toronto		Varlamov	19,248	21–17–8	50
47	January 16	Colorado	2–5	Ottawa		Varlamov	14,468	21–18–8	50
48	January 19	Los Angeles	1–7	Colorado		Varlamov	18,043	22–18–8	52
49	January 21	Nashville	4–1	Colorado		Varlamov	18,018	22–19–8	52
50	January 23	Minnesota	5–2	Colorado		Grubauer	17,310	22–20–8	52

February: 6–4–4 (Home: 3–4–1; Road: 3–0–3)
#	Date	Visitor	Score	Home	OT	Decision	Attendance	Record	Pts	Recap
51	February 2	Vancouver	5–1	Colorado		Varlamov	18,027	22–21–8	52
52	February 5	Columbus	6–3	Colorado		Grubauer	15,398	22–22–8	52
53	February 7	Colorado	3–4	Washington	OT	Varlamov	18,506	22–22–9	53
54	February 9	Colorado	3–4	NY Islanders	OT	Varlamov	14,216	22–22–10	54
55	February 10	Colorado	1–2	Boston	OT	Varlamov	17,565	22–22–11	55
56	February 12	Toronto	5–2	Colorado		Varlamov	16,426	22–23–11	55
57	February 14	Colorado	4–1	Winnipeg		Varlamov	15,321	23–23–11	57
58	February 16	St. Louis	3–0	Colorado		Varlamov	18,076	23–24–11	57
59	February 18	Vegas	0–3	Colorado		Varlamov	17,808	24–24–11	59
60	February 20	Winnipeg	1–7	Colorado		Varlamov	15,021	25–24–11	61
61	February 22	Colorado	5–3	Chicago		Varlamov	21,653	26–24–11	63
62	February 23	Colorado	5–0	Nashville		Grubauer	17,760	27–24–11	65
63	February 25	Florida	4–3	Colorado	OT	Varlamov	14,338	27–24–12	66
64	February 27	Vancouver	2–3	Colorado	SO	Varlamov	14,867	28–24–12	68

March: 8–5–1 (Home: 6–2–0; Road: 2–3–1)
#	Date	Visitor	Score	Home	OT	Decision	Attendance	Record	Pts	Recap
65	March 1	Colorado	3–4	San Jose		Varlamov	17,351	28–25–12	68
66	March 3	Colorado	1–2	Anaheim		Grubauer	16,690	28–26–12	68
67	March 5	Detroit	3–4	Colorado	OT	Varlamov	18,011	29–26–12	70
68	March 7	Colorado	0–4	Dallas		Varlamov	18,011	29–27–12	70
69	March 9	Buffalo	0–3	Colorado		Grubauer	18,052	30–27–12	72
70	March 11	Carolina	3–0	Colorado		Grubauer	16,711	30–28–12	72
71	March 15	Anaheim	5–3	Colorado		Varlamov	18,025	30–29–12	72
72	March 17	New Jersey	0–3	Colorado		Grubauer	18,037	31–29–12	74
73	March 19	Colorado	3–1	Minnesota		Grubauer	18,785	32–29–12	76
74	March 21	Colorado	3–1	Dallas		Grubauer	17,543	33–29–12	78
75	March 23	Chicago	2–4	Colorado		Grubauer	17,099	34–29–12	80
76	March 24	Colorado	1–2	Chicago	OT	Grubauer	21,410	34–29–13	81
77	March 27	Vegas	3–4	Colorado		Grubauer	16,799	35–29–13	83
78	March 29	Arizona	2–3	Colorado	SO	Grubauer	18,045	36–29–13	85

April: 2–1–1 (Home: 2–0–0; Road: 0–1–1)
#	Date	Visitor	Score	Home	OT	Decision	Attendance	Record	Pts	Recap
79	April 1	Colorado	2–3	St. Louis	SO	Grubauer	17,767	36–29–14	86
80	April 2	Edmonton	2–6	Colorado		Varlamov	17,021	37–29–14	88
81	April 4	Winnipeg	2–3	Colorado	OT	Grubauer	18,003	38–29–14	90
82	April 6	Colorado	2–5	San Jose		Varlamov	17,562	38–30–14	90

Legend: Win (2 points) Loss (0 points) Overtime/shootout loss (1 point)

=== Playoffs ===
The Avalanche faced the Calgary Flames in the first round of the playoffs, and defeated them in five games.

The Avalanche faced the San Jose Sharks in the second round of the playoffs, and were defeated in seven games.

2019 Stanley Cup playoffs

Western Conference first round vs. (P1) Calgary Flames: Colorado won 4–1
#	Date	Visitor	Score	Home	OT	Decision	Attendance	Series	Recap
1	April 11	Colorado	0–4	Calgary		Grubauer	19,289	0–1
2	April 13	Colorado	3–2	Calgary	OT	Grubauer	19,289	1–1
3	April 15	Calgary	2–6	Colorado		Grubauer	18,098	2–1
4	April 17	Calgary	2–3	Colorado	OT	Grubauer	18,102	3–1
5	April 19	Colorado	5–1	Calgary		Grubauer	19,289	4–1

Western Conference second round vs. (P2) San Jose Sharks: San Jose won 4–3
#	Date	Visitor	Score	Home	OT	Decision	Attendance	Series	Recap
1	April 26	Colorado	2–5	San Jose		Grubauer	17,562	0–1
2	April 28	Colorado	4–3	San Jose		Grubauer	17,562	1–1
3	April 30	San Jose	4–2	Colorado		Grubauer	18,106	1–2
4	May 2	San Jose	0–3	Colorado		Grubauer	18,110	2–2
5	May 4	Colorado	1–2	San Jose		Grubauer	17,562	2–3
6	May 6	San Jose	3–4	Colorado	OT	Grubauer	18,098	3–3
7	May 8	Colorado	2–3	San Jose		Grubauer	17,562	3–4

Legend: Win Loss

== Player statistics ==
Final stats

Skaters

Regular season
Player	GP	G	A	Pts	+/−	PIM
Nathan MacKinnon	82	41	58	99	+20	34
Mikko Rantanen	74	31	56	87	+13	54
Gabriel Landeskog	73	34	41	75	+17	51
Tyson Barrie	78	14	45	59	−3	36
Carl Soderberg	82	23	26	49	−5	26
Alexander Kerfoot	78	15	27	42	−9	38
J. T. Compher	66	16	16	32	−8	31
Colin Wilson	65	12	15	27	−6	8
Samuel Girard	82	4	23	27	+8	6
Matt Calvert	82	11	15	26	−10	58
Tyson Jost	70	11	15	26	−2	14
Erik Johnson	80	7	18	25	+8	38
Matt Nieto	64	4	19	23	+2	8
Sven Andrighetto	64	7	10	17	+10	14
Ian Cole	71	2	13	15	−1	115
Nikita Zadorov	70	7	7	14	+19	75
Patrik Nemeth	74	1	9	10	+5	53
Gabriel Bourque	55	2	6	8	+3	10
Sheldon Dries	40	3	3	6	−7	26
Ryan Graves	26	3	2	5	+4	2
Vladislav Kamenev	23	2	3	5	−2	10
Derick Brassard^{†}	20	4	0	4	−7	8
A.J. Greer	15	1	1	2	−2	14
Andrew Agozzino	11	1	1	2	+2	0
Mark Barberio	12	1	0	1	−6	4
Dominic Toninato	2	1	0	1	0	0
Marko Dano^{‡}	8	0	0	0	−1	7
Logan O'Connor	5	0	0	0	−2	0
Mark Alt	2	0	0	0	0	0
Anton Lindholm	2	0	0	0	−1	0

Playoffs
Player	GP	G	A	Pts	+/−	PIM
Mikko Rantanen	12	6	8	14	−1	4
Nathan MacKinnon	12	6	7	13	−4	2
Colin Wilson	12	4	4	8	0	2
Gabriel Landeskog	12	3	5	8	−2	10
Tyson Barrie	12	1	7	8	+1	4
Matt Nieto	12	4	3	7	+6	2
J. T. Compher	12	4	2	6	+1	0
Cale Makar	10	1	5	6	+3	0
Ian Cole	12	0	5	5	+6	16
Tyson Jost	12	3	1	4	+3	0
Matt Calvert	8	0	4	4	+3	18
Erik Johnson	12	2	1	3	−1	4
Alexander Kerfoot	12	0	3	3	−1	6
Carl Soderberg	12	0	2	2	+4	8
Samuel Girard	9	0	2	2	+3	0
Gabriel Bourque	12	1	0	1	0	2
Derick Brassard	9	0	1	1	−2	8
Nikita Zadorov	12	0	0	0	−5	24
Patrik Nemeth	7	0	0	0	+4	4
Sven Andrighetto	5	0	0	0	−2	2

Goaltenders

Regular season
Player	GP	GS	TOI	W	L	OT	GA	GAA	SA	SV%	SO	G	A	PIM
Pavel Francouz	2	0	61:11	0	2	0	2	1.96	35	.943	0	0	0	0
Philipp Grubauer	37	33	2020:44	18	9	5	89	2.64	1071	.917	3	0	0	0
Semyon Varlamov	49	49	2839:12	20	19	9	136	2.87	1496	.909	2	0	0	2

Playoffs
Player	GP	GS	TOI	W	L	GA	GAA	SA	SV%	SO	G	A	PIM
Philipp Grubauer	12	12	731:47	7	5	28	2.30	373	.925	1	0	1	0

^{†}Denotes player spent time with another team before joining the Avalanche. Stats reflect time with the Avalanche only.
^{‡}Denotes player was traded mid-season. Stats reflect time with the Avalanche only.
Bold/italics denotes franchise record.

== Transactions ==
The Avalanche have been involved in the following transactions during the 2018–19 season.

=== Trades ===
Date	Details		Ref
June 22, 2018	To Washington Capitals 2nd-round pick in 2018	To Colorado Avalanche Philipp Grubauer; Brooks Orpik	
June 23, 2018	To Pittsburgh Penguins NSH's 2nd-round pick in 2018	To Colorado Avalanche OTT's 3rd-round pick in 2018; 5th-round pick in 2018	
February 6, 2019	To Ottawa Senators J. C. Beaudin	To Colorado Avalanche Max McCormick	
February 25, 2019	To Florida Panthers 3rd-round pick in 2020	To Colorado Avalanche Derick Brassard; Conditional 6th-round pick in 2020	

=== Free agents ===
Date	Player	Team	Contract term	Ref
July 1, 2018	Jonathan Bernier	to Detroit Red Wings	3-year	
July 1, 2018	Matt Calvert	from Columbus Blue Jackets	3-year	
July 1, 2018	Ian Cole	from Columbus Blue Jackets	3-year	
July 1, 2018	Blake Comeau	to Dallas Stars	3-year	
July 1, 2018	Rocco Grimaldi	to Nashville Predators	1-year	
July 1, 2018	Andrew Hammond	to Minnesota Wild	1-year	
July 2, 2018	Sheldon Dries	from Texas Stars (AHL)	1-year	
July 2, 2018	Scott Kosmachuk	from Hartford Wolf Pack (AHL)	1-year	
July 3, 2018	Nail Yakupov	to SKA Saint Petersburg (KHL)	1-year	
July 4, 2018	Felix Girard	to Manitoba Moose (AHL)	1-year	
July 23, 2018	Logan O'Connor	from Denver Pioneers (NCHC)	2-year	
July 24, 2018	Brooks Orpik	to Washington Capitals	1-year	
August 30, 2018	Jesse Graham	to Utica Comets (AHL)	1-year	

=== Waivers ===
Date	Player	Team	Ref
October 15, 2018	Marko Dano	from Winnipeg Jets	
November 23, 2018	Marko Dano	to Winnipeg Jets	

=== Contract terminations ===
Date	Player	Via	Ref
June 24, 2018	Brooks Orpik	Buyout	

=== Retirement ===
Date	Player	Ref

=== Signings ===
Date	Player	Contract term	Ref
June 23, 2018	Philipp Grubauer	3-year	
July 2, 2018	Joe Cannata	1-year	
July 5, 2018	Martin Kaut	3-year	
July 6, 2018	Matt Nieto	2-year	
July 16, 2018	Mason Geertsen	1-year	
July 16, 2018	Ryan Graves	1-year	
July 16, 2018	Spencer Martin	1-year	
August 2, 2018	Patrik Nemeth	1-year	
March 1, 2019	Nick Henry	3-year	
March 29, 2019	Shane Bowers	3-year	
April 14, 2019	Cale Makar	3-year	
May 13, 2019	Adam Werner	2-year	
May 24, 2019	Pavel Francouz	1-year	

== Draft picks ==
Below are the Colorado Avalanche's selections at the 2018 NHL entry draft, which was held on June 22 and 23, 2018, at the American Airlines Center in Dallas, Texas.

Round	#	Player	Pos	Nationality	College/Junior/Club team (League)
1	16	Martin Kaut	RW	Czech Republic	Dynamo Pardubice (ELH)
3	64^{1}	Justus Annunen	G	Finland	Karpat U20 (Nuorten SM-liiga)
3	78	Sampo Ranta	LW	Finland	Sioux City Musketeers (USHL)
4	109	Tyler Weiss	LW	United States	U.S. NTDP (USHL)
5	140	Brandon Saigeon	C	Canada	Hamilton Bulldogs (OHL)
5	146^{2}	Danila Zhuravlyov	D	Russia	Irbis Kazan (MHL)
6	171	Nikolai Kovalenko	RW	Russia	Loko Yaroslavl (MHL)
7	202	Shamil Shmakov	G	Russia	Sibirskie Snaypery (MHL)

Notes:

1. The Ottawa Senators' third-round pick went to the Colorado Avalanche as the result of a trade on June 23, 2018, that sent Nashville's second-round pick in 2018 (58th overall) to Pittsburgh in exchange for a fifth-round pick in 2018 (146th overall) and this pick.
2. The Pittsburgh Penguins' fifth-round pick went to the Colorado Avalanche as the result of a trade on June 23, 2018, that sent Nashville's second-round pick in 2018 (58th overall) to Pittsburgh in exchange for Ottawa's third-round pick in 2018 (64th overall) and this pick.
