= Johan Södergran =

Swedish professional ice hockey winger (born 1999)

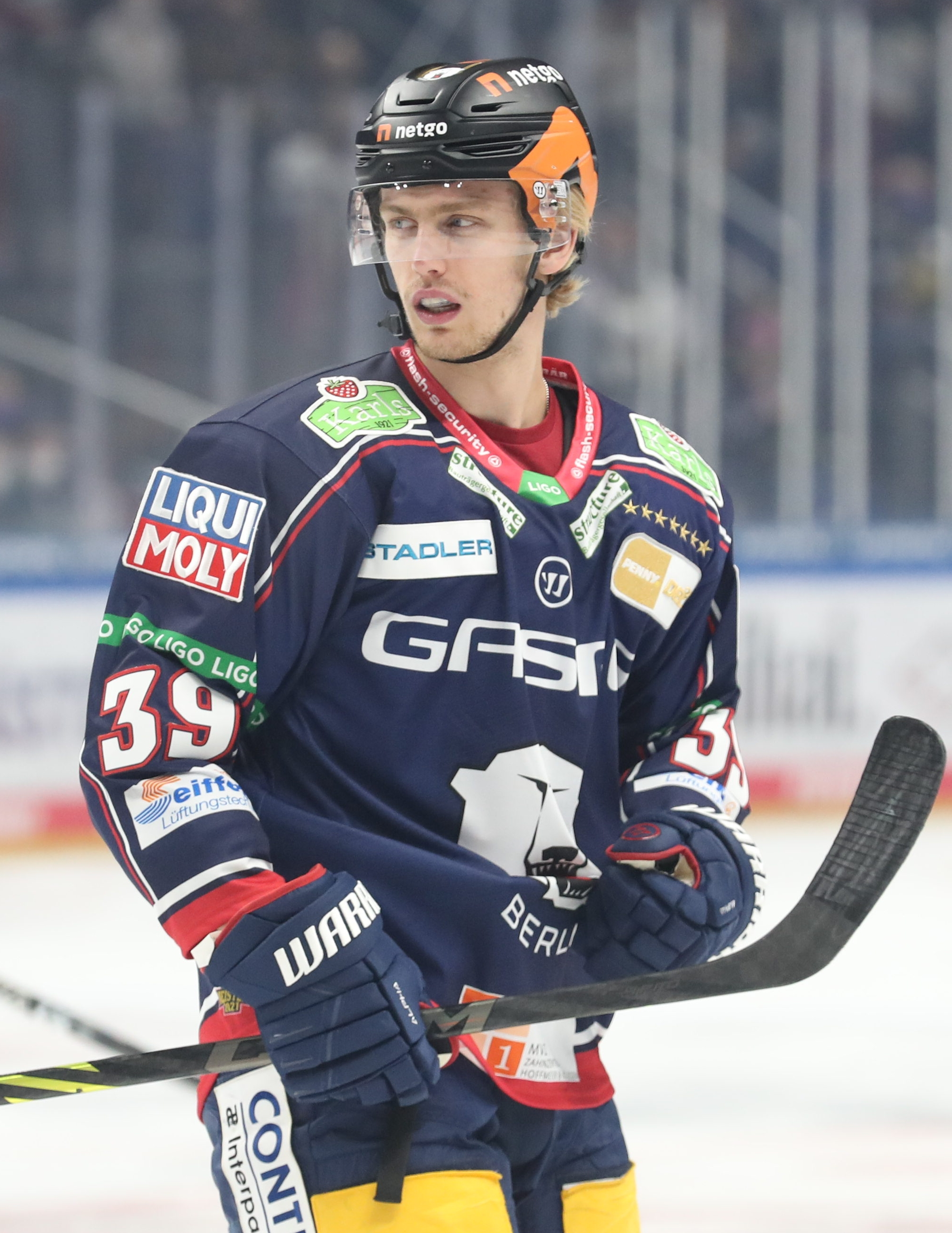
- Born: November 20, 1999 (age 26) Stockholm, Sweden
- Height: 6 ft 3 in (191 cm)
- Weight: 205 lb (93 kg; 14 st 9 lb)
- Position: Right wing
- Shoots: Left
- SHL team Former teams: Linköping HC; Eisbären Berlin; MoDo Hockey
- NHL draft: 165th overall, 2018; Los Angeles Kings
- Playing career: 2016–present

Johan Södergran (born November 20, 1999) is a Swedish ice hockey forward who plays for Linköping HC in the Swedish Hockey League (SHL). The Los Angeles Kings selected him in the sixth round, 165th overall, of the 2018 NHL entry draft.

== Playing career ==
Södergran made his first appearance in the SHL with Linköping HC in 2016, stepping onto the ice for a single game during the 2015–16 SHL season.

During the 2018–19 season, Södergran established himself as a regular contributor for Linköping HC, appearing in 42 games and recording 8 goals along with 5 assists for 13 points. Recognizing his potential, the Los Angeles Kings, who had selected him in the sixth round of the 2018 NHL Entry Draft, signed him to a three-year, entry-level contract on June 10, 2019.

Due to the COVID-19 pandemic delaying his second pro season in North America, Södergran stayed in Sweden and was loaned to Almtuna IS of HockeyAllsvenskan by the Kings on August 29, 2020. He played 12 games for Almtuna, recording 3 points, before his loan was cut short because of an injury.

Södergran came back to North America for the 2021–22 season, where he scored 3 goals over just 7 games before being sent back to Europe to further his development, joining the German DEL club Eisbären Berlin on loan from the Kings on March 2, 2022.

Following his role in Eisbären Berlin's championship win, Södergran became a free agent from the Kings and returned to Sweden, signing a two-year deal with MoDo Hockey of the Allsvenskan on May 26, 2022.

After MoDo Hockey's demotion to the Allsvenskan, Södergran left the club to remain in the SHL, signing a two-year contract for a second stint with Linköping HC on 9 April 2025.

== Career statistics ==
=== Regular season and playoffs ===
			Regular season					Playoffs
Season	Team	League	GP	G	A	Pts	PIM	GP	G	A	Pts	PIM
2015–16	Linköping HC	J20	3	1	0	1	2	—	—	—	—	—
2016–17	Linköping HC	J20	30	2	9	11	6	2	1	1	2	0
2016–17	Linköping HC	SHL	1	0	0	0	0	—	—	—	—	—
2017–18	Linköping HC	J20	37	17	16	33	10	3	2	0	2	0
2017–18	Linköping HC	SHL	20	0	0	0	0	4	0	0	0	0
2018–19	Linköping HC	SHL	42	8	5	13	4	—	—	—	—	—
2018–19	Linköping HC	J20	2	0	1	1	0	6	2	1	3	0
2019–20	Ontario Reign	AHL	48	2	5	7	8	—	—	—	—	—
2020–21	Almtuna IS	Allsv	12	1	2	3	6	—	—	—	—	—
2021–22	Ontario Reign	AHL	7	3	0	3	0	—	—	—	—	—
2021–22	Eisbären Berlin	DEL	7	1	3	4	2	5	1	1	2	0
2022–23	MoDo Hockey	Allsv	52	5	12	17	12	17	5	7	12	0
2023–24	MoDo Hockey	SHL	51	6	8	14	2	—	—	—	—	—
2024–25	MoDo Hockey	SHL	50	12	12	24	36	—	—	—	—	—
2025–26	Linköping HC	SHL	52	5	5	10	8	—	—	—	—	—
SHL totals			216	31	30	61	50	4	0	0	0	0

=== International ===
Year	Team	Event	Result	GP	G	A	Pts	PIM
2019	Sweden	WJC	5th	4	0	0	0	4
Junior totals				4	0	0	0	4
