= List of 2018–19 NHL Three Star Awards =

The 2018–19 NHL Three Star Awards are the way the National Hockey League denotes its players of the week and players of the month of the 2018–19 season.

== Weekly ==
Weekly
Week	First Star	Second Star	Third Star
October 7, 2018	Auston Matthews (Toronto Maple Leafs)	Jonathan Toews (Chicago Blackhawks)	Ben Bishop (Dallas Stars)
October 14, 2018	Patrice Bergeron (Boston Bruins)	Morgan Rielly (Toronto Maple Leafs)	Sebastian Aho (Carolina Hurricanes)
October 21, 2018	Gabriel Landeskog (Colorado Avalanche)	Connor McDavid (Edmonton Oilers)	Marc-Andre Fleury (Vegas Golden Knights)
October 28, 2018	Sidney Crosby (Pittsburgh Penguins)	Mark Scheifele (Winnipeg Jets)	Mikko Rantanen (Colorado Avalanche)
November 4, 2018	Sean Monahan (Calgary Flames)	Elias Pettersson (Vancouver Canucks)	Brayden Point (Tampa Bay Lightning)
November 11, 2018	David Pastrnak (Boston Bruins)	Blake Wheeler (Winnipeg Jets)	Claude Giroux (Philadelphia Flyers)
November 18, 2018	Cam Atkinson (Columbus Blue Jackets)	Corey Crawford (Chicago Blackhawks)	Joe Pavelski (San Jose Sharks)
November 25, 2018	Patrik Laine (Winnipeg Jets)	Marc-Andre Fleury (Vegas Golden Knights)	Nikita Kucherov (Tampa Bay Lightning)
December 2, 2018	Mark Scheifele (Winnipeg Jets)	Adin Hill (Arizona Coyotes)	Jonathan Huberdeau (Florida Panthers)
December 9, 2018	Elias Pettersson (Vancouver Canucks)	Louis Domingue (Tampa Bay Lightning)	Johnny Gaudreau (Calgary Flames)
December 16, 2018	Alexander Ovechkin (Washington Capitals)	Mark Scheifele (Winnipeg Jets)	Jack Eichel (Buffalo Sabres)
December 23, 2018	Sergei Bobrovsky (Columbus Blue Jackets)	Morgan Rielly (Toronto Maple Leafs)	Nikita Kucherov (Tampa Bay Lightning)
December 30, 2018	Patrick Kane (Chicago Blackhawks)	Mathew Barzal (New York Islanders)	Mackenzie Blackwood (New Jersey Devils)
January 6, 2019	Johnny Gaudreau (Calgary Flames)	Brent Burns (San Jose Sharks)	Robin Lehner (New York Islanders)
January 13, 2019	Mark Giordano (Calgary Flames)	Jordan Binnington (St. Louis Blues)	Jake Guentzel (Pittsburgh Penguins)
January 20, 2019	Robin Lehner (New York Islanders)	Mika Zibanejad (New York Rangers)	Patrick Kane (Chicago Blackhawks)
January 27, 2019	Sidney Crosby (Pittsburgh Penguins)	Joe Pavelski (San Jose Sharks)	Devan Dubnyk (Minnesota Wild)
February 3, 2019	Jack Roslovic (Winnipeg Jets)	Carter Hart (Philadelphia Flyers)	Mika Zibanejad (New York Rangers)
February 10, 2019	Jordan Binnington (St. Louis Blues)	Patrice Bergeron (Boston Bruins)	Dylan Strome (Chicago Blackhawks)
February 17, 2019	Nikita Kucherov (Tampa Bay Lightning)	Vladimir Tarasenko (St. Louis Blues)	Sidney Crosby (Pittsburgh Penguins)
February 24, 2019	Semyon Varlamov (Colorado Avalanche)	Aleksander Barkov (Florida Panthers)	Sergei Bobrovsky (Columbus Blue Jackets)
March 3, 2019	Marc-Andre Fleury (Vegas Golden Knights)	Blake Wheeler (Winnipeg Jets)	Sidney Crosby (Pittsburgh Penguins)
March 10, 2019	Jonathan Huberdeau (Florida Panthers)	Ben Bishop (Dallas Stars)	Troy Terry (Anaheim Ducks)
March 17, 2019	Thomas Greiss (New York Islanders)	Brendan Perlini (Chicago Blackhawks)	Connor McDavid (Edmonton Oilers)
March 24, 2019	Kyle Connor (Winnipeg Jets)	Steven Stamkos (Tampa Bay Lightning)	Philipp Grubauer (Colorado Avalanche)
March 31, 2019	Sergei Bobrovsky (Columbus Blue Jackets)	Tyler Bertuzzi (Detroit Red Wings)	Darcy Kuemper (Arizona Coyotes)
April 7, 2019	Vladimir Tarasenko (St. Louis Blues)	Pekka Rinne (Nashville Predators)	Alexander Radulov (Dallas Stars)

== Monthly ==
Monthly
Month	First Star	Second Star	Third Star
October	Mikko Rantanen (Colorado Avalanche)	Evgeni Malkin (Pittsburgh Penguins)	Patrick Kane (Chicago Blackhawks)
November	Patrik Laine (Winnipeg Jets)	Nathan MacKinnon (Colorado Avalanche)	Marc-Andre Fleury (Vegas Golden Knights)
December	Nikita Kucherov (Tampa Bay Lightning)	Johnny Gaudreau (Calgary Flames)	Connor McDavid (Edmonton Oilers)
January	Johnny Gaudreau (Calgary Flames)	Robin Lehner (New York Islanders)	Patrick Kane (Chicago Blackhawks)
February	Nikita Kucherov (Tampa Bay Lightning)	Patrick Kane (Chicago Blackhawks)	Vladimir Tarasenko (St. Louis Blues)
March	Connor McDavid (Edmonton Oilers)	Sergei Bobrovsky (Columbus Blue Jackets)	Brad Marchand (Boston Bruins)

== Rookie of the Month ==
Rookie of the Month
Month	Player
October	Elias Pettersson (Vancouver Canucks)
November	Rasmus Dahlin (Buffalo Sabres)
December	Elias Pettersson (Vancouver Canucks)
January	Carter Hart (Philadelphia Flyers)
February	Jordan Binnington (St. Louis Blues)
March	Jordan Binnington (St. Louis Blues)
