= David Rittich =

Czech ice hockey player (born 1992)

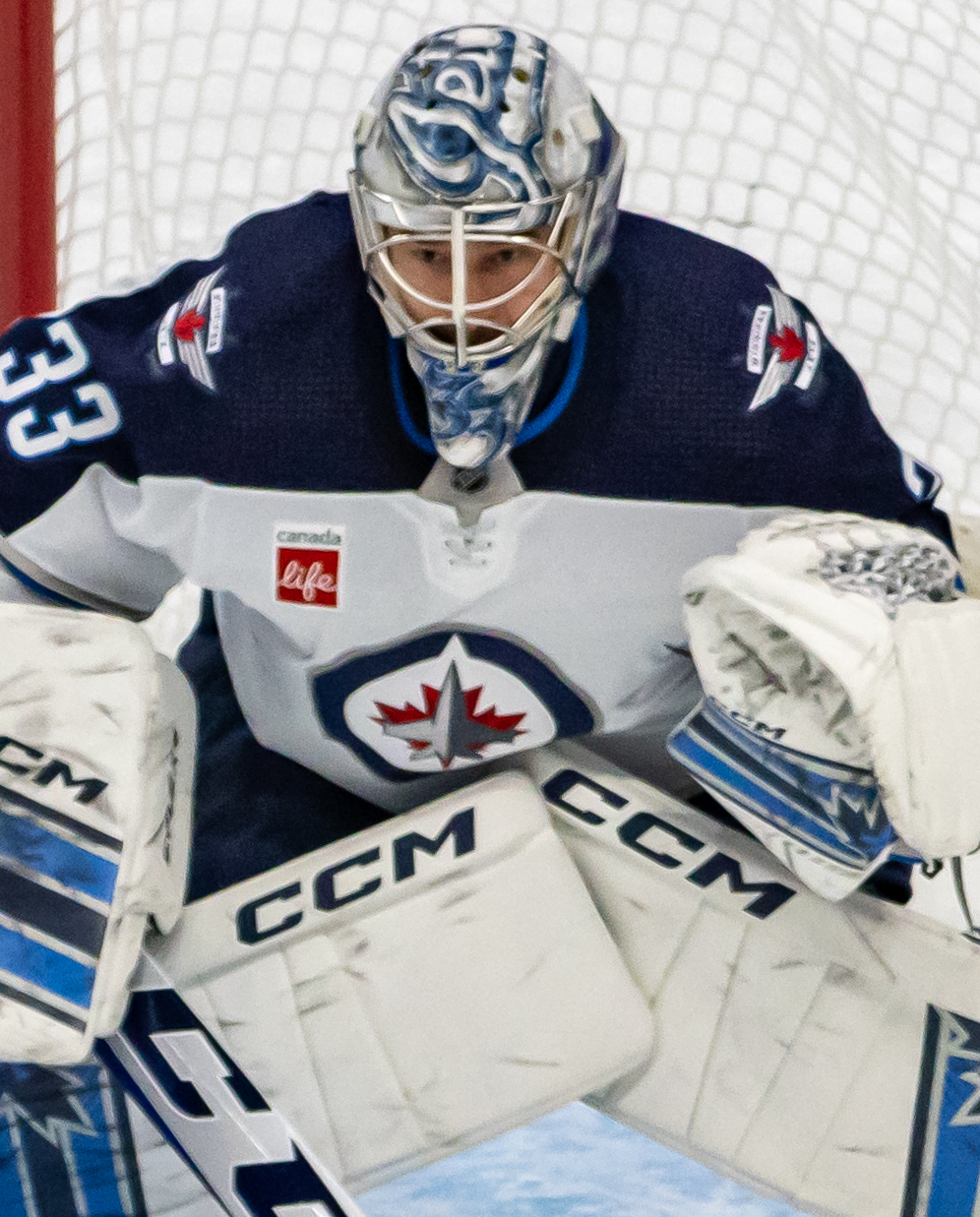
- Rittich with the Winnipeg Jets in 2022
- Born: 19 August 1992 (age 34) Jihlava, Czechoslovakia
- Height: 6 ft 3 in (191 cm)
- Weight: 200 lb (91 kg; 14 st 4 lb)
- Position: Goaltender
- Catches: Left
- NHL team (P) Cur. team Former teams: New Jersey Devils; Utica Comets (AHL); BK Mladá Boleslav; Calgary Flames; Toronto Maple Leafs; Nashville Predators; Winnipeg Jets; Los Angeles Kings; New York Islanders
- National team: Czech Republic
- NHL draft: Undrafted
- Playing career: 2014–present

David Rittich Jr. (born 19 August 1992) is a Czech professional ice hockey player who is a goaltender for the Utica Comets in the American Hockey League (AHL) while under contract to the New Jersey Devils of the National Hockey League (NHL). Nicknamed "Big Save Dave", he has previously played for the Calgary Flames, Toronto Maple Leafs, Nashville Predators, Winnipeg Jets, Los Angeles Kings and New York Islanders. Rittich was an NHL All-Star in 2020 and has represented his native Czech Republic internationally.

== Playing career ==
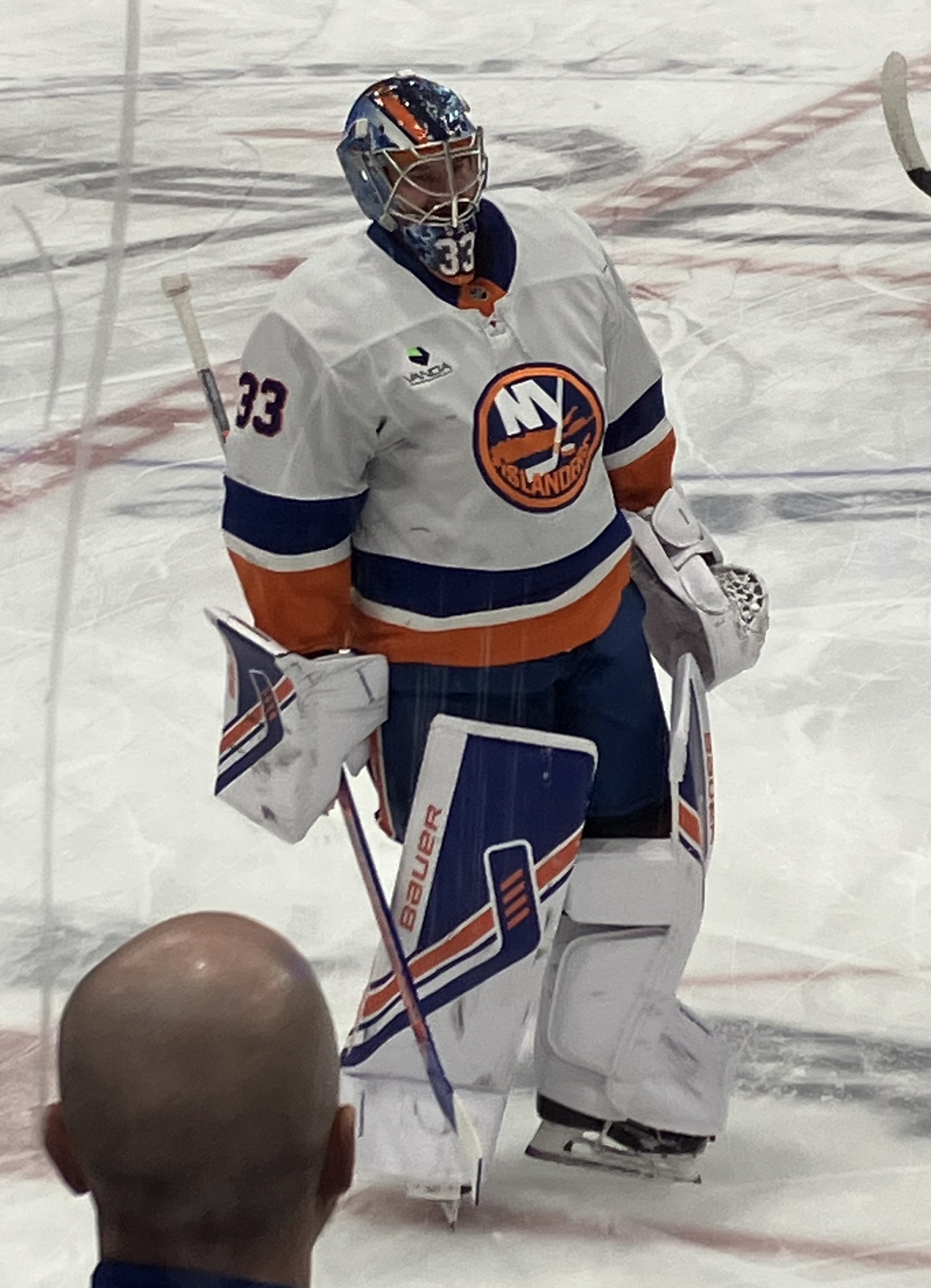
Rittich with the New York Islanders in 2026

Rittich made his Czech Extraliga debut with BK Mladá Boleslav during the 2014–15 Czech Extraliga season. After two successful performances in the ELH, Rittich was signed to a one-year, two-way contract on 10 June 2016, by the Calgary Flames of the National Hockey League (NHL).

Rittich made his NHL debut against the San Jose Sharks in the third period of the Flames' final regular season game of the year. He made nine saves on 10 shots after replacing Brian Elliott in the third period to finish the game with a 3–2 loss. Rittich recorded his first NHL win in the 2017–18 season on 25 November 2017, in a game against the Colorado Avalanche. In December 2017, the Flames traded their backup goaltender Eddie Läck away, making Rittich a full-time NHL goaltender for the first time as the backup to Mike Smith. In his first season with the club, Rittich finished with an 8–6–3 record. On 26 July 2018, the Flames re-signed Rittich to a one-year, $800,000 contract extension. On 10 November 2018, Rittich earned his first shutout in the NHL against the Los Angeles Kings in a 1–0 win with the only goal scored by Travis Hamonic. In July 2019 the Flames re-signed David Rittich to a two-year contract. In the shortened 2020–21 season, on 22 February 2021, Rittich turned aside 34 shots to become the third goaltender in Flames' history to shutout the Toronto Maple Leafs in Toronto, and the first since Yves Bélanger accomplished the feat on 31 December 1977, when the franchise was located in Atlanta. It was Rittich's fourth career shutout.

In the final year of his contract, Rittich was traded by the Flames at the NHL deadline on 11 April 2021, to the Toronto Maple Leafs as goaltending depth in exchange for a third-round pick in the 2022 NHL entry draft. He made four regular season appearances with the Maple Leafs, posting a 1–1–1 record, but was a healthy scratch during the playoffs.

As a free agent, Rittich was signed to a one-year, $1.25 million contract by the Nashville Predators on 28 July 2021.

Following a lone season with the Predators, Rittich left as a free agent and was signed to a one-year, $900,000 contract by the Winnipeg Jets on 13 July 2022. Serving as the backup to Jets starting goaltender, Connor Hellebuyck, Rittich made 21 appearances in the 2022–23 season collecting nine wins.

At the conclusion of his contract with the Jets, Rittich signed a one-year, $875,000 contract with the Los Angeles Kings on 1 July 2023. On 15 May 2024, he was signed to a one-year contract extension by the Kings.

On 1 July 2025, Rittich signed a one-year contract with the New York Islanders for the 2025–26 season. As a backup goalie for the Islanders, he made 30 appearances, starting 28 and posting a 14-10-3 record, a 2.76 goals-against average, and a .894 save percentage, with two shutouts.

As a free agent after his lone season with the Islanders, Rittich was signed to a one-year, $1 million contract with the New Jersey Devils for the 2026–27 season on 3 July 2026.

== Career statistics ==
=== Regular season and playoffs ===
			Regular season									Playoffs
Season	Team	League	GP	W	L	T/OT	MIN	GA	SO	GAA	SV%	GP	W	L	MIN	GA	SO	GAA	SV%
2014–15	BK Mladá Boleslav	ELH	23	8	15	0	1,218	64	0	3.15	.891	—	—	—	—	—	—	—	—
2015–16	BK Mladá Boleslav	ELH	48	26	22	0	2,849	120	5	2.53	.917	10	4	6	638	34	1	3.20	.903
2016–17	Stockton Heat	AHL	31	15	11	1	1,774	67	5	2.27	.924	4	2	1	167	8	0	2.88	.917
2016–17	Calgary Flames	NHL	1	0	0	0	20	1	0	3.00	.900	—	—	—	—	—	—	—	—
2017–18	Stockton Heat	AHL	12	7	5	0	697	37	2	3.18	.889	—	—	—	—	—	—	—	—
2017–18	Calgary Flames	NHL	21	8	6	3	1,009	49	0	2.92	.904	—	—	—	—	—	—	—	—
2018–19	Calgary Flames	NHL	45	27	9	5	2,503	109	1	2.61	.911	—	—	—	—	—	—	—	—
2019–20	Calgary Flames	NHL	48	24	17	6	2,792	138	2	2.97	.907	1	0	1	17	3	0	10.85	.667
2020–21	Calgary Flames	NHL	15	4	7	1	746	36	1	2.90	.904	—	—	—	—	—	—	—	—
2020–21	Toronto Maple Leafs	NHL	4	1	1	1	221	10	0	2.72	.888	—	—	—	—	—	—	—	—
2021–22	Nashville Predators	NHL	17	6	3	4	823	49	0	3.57	.886	1	0	1	15	5	0	19.91	.615
2022–23	Winnipeg Jets	NHL	21	9	8	1	1,122	50	0	2.67	.901	—	—	—	—	—	—	—	—
2023–24	Ontario Reign	AHL	16	7	6	3	914	40	3	2.63	.901	—	—	—	—	—	—	—	—
2023–24	Los Angeles Kings	NHL	24	13	6	3	1,365	49	3	2.15	.921	2	0	2	117	5	0	2.56	.872
2024–25	Los Angeles Kings	NHL	34	16	14	2	1,860	87	0	2.81	.887	—	—	—	—	—	—	—	—
2025–26	New York Islanders	NHL	30	14	10	3	1,651	76	2	2.76	.894	—	—	—	—	—	—	—	—
NHL totals			260	122	81	29	14,110	654	9	2.79	.903	4	0	4	149	13	0	5.24	.787

=== International ===
Year	Team	Event	Result	GP	W	L	OT	MIN	GA	SO	GAA	SV%
2018	Czech Republic	WC	7th	3	2	1	0	182	6	1	1.98	.900
Senior totals				3	2	1	0	182	6	1	1.98	.900

== Awards and honours ==
Award	Year	Ref
NHL
NHL All-Star Game	2020	
