= 2018–19 Chicago Blackhawks season =

National Hockey League team season

2018–19 Chicago Blackhawks
- Division: 6th Central
- Conference: 10th Western
- 2018–19 record: 36–34–12
- Home record: 19–14–8
- Road record: 17–20–4
- Goals for: 270
- Goals against: 292

Team information
- General manager: Stan Bowman
- Coach: Joel Quenneville (Oct. 4 – Nov. 6); Jeremy Colliton (Nov. 6 – Apr. 6)
- Captain: Jonathan Toews
- Alternate captains: Duncan Keith; Brent Seabrook
- Arena: United Center; Notre Dame Stadium (1 game)
- Average attendance: 22,734
- Minor league affiliates: Rockford IceHogs (AHL); Indy Fuel (ECHL)

Team leaders
- Goals: Patrick Kane (44)
- Assists: Patrick Kane (66)
- Points: Patrick Kane (110)
- Penalty minutes: Duncan Keith (70)
- Plus/minus: Duncan Keith (+13)
- Wins: Cam Ward (16)
- Goals against average: Corey Crawford (2.93)

The 2018–19 Chicago Blackhawks season was the 93rd season for the National Hockey League (NHL) franchise that was established on September 25, 1926. The Blackhawks were coached by Joel Quenneville, in his 11th season as the Blackhawks' head coach, for the first 15 games of the season. On November 6, 2018, Quenneville was fired and Jeremy Colliton was named the new head coach.

The Blackhawks were eliminated from playoff contention on April 2, 2019. This marked the first time since the 2006–07 and 2007–08 seasons that the Blackhawks had missed the playoffs in back-to-back seasons. The Blackhawks finished the season 36–34–12 to finish in sixth place in the Central Division.

Patrick Kane led the team in scoring, scoring 44 goals and a regular-season career high of 110 points. Alex DeBrincat scored 41 goals in his second season in the NHL while Jonathan Toews had a resurgent year, scoring a regular-season career high in goals (35) and points (81).

== Standings ==
Central Division
Pos	Team	GP	W	L	OTL	ROW	GF	GA	GD	Pts
1	y – Nashville Predators	82	47	29	6	43	240	214	+26	100
2	x – Winnipeg Jets	82	47	30	5	45	272	244	+28	99
3	x – St. Louis Blues	82	45	28	9	42	247	223	+24	99
4	x – Dallas Stars	82	43	32	7	42	210	202	+8	93
5	x – Colorado Avalanche	82	38	30	14	36	260	246	+14	90
6	Chicago Blackhawks	82	36	34	12	33	270	292	−22	84
7	Minnesota Wild	82	37	36	9	36	211	237	−26	83

Source: National Hockey League
x – Clinched playoff spot; y – Clinched division

Western Conference Wild Card
Pos	Div	Team	GP	W	L	OTL	ROW	GF	GA	GD	Pts
1	CE	x – Dallas Stars	82	43	32	7	42	210	202	+8	93
2	CE	x – Colorado Avalanche	82	38	30	14	36	260	246	+14	90
3	PA	Arizona Coyotes	82	39	35	8	35	213	223	−10	86
4	CE	Chicago Blackhawks	82	36	34	12	33	270	292	−22	84
5	CE	Minnesota Wild	82	37	36	9	36	211	237	−26	83
6	PA	Vancouver Canucks	82	35	36	11	29	225	254	−29	81
7	PA	Anaheim Ducks	82	35	37	10	32	199	251	−52	80
8	PA	Edmonton Oilers	82	35	38	9	32	232	274	−42	79
9	PA	Los Angeles Kings	82	31	42	9	28	202	263	−61	71

Source: National Hockey League
x – Clinched playoff spot

== Schedule and results ==
=== Preseason ===
The preseason schedule was published on June 15, 2018.

2018 preseason game log: 2–4–0 (Home: 1–2–0; Road: 1–2–0)
#	Date	Opponent	Score	OT	Decision	Arena	Attendance	Record	Recap
1	September 18	@ Columbus	1–4		Ward	Nationwide Arena	10,422	0–1–0	L1
2	September 20	@ Detroit	2–4		Lankinen	Little Caesars Arena	16,475	0–2–0	L2
3	September 21	@ Ottawa	5–2		Tomkins	Canadian Tire Centre	7,891	1–2–0	W1
4	September 25	Detroit	6–8		Forsberg	United Center	19,864	1–3–0	L1
5	September 27	Ottawa	1–2		Forsberg	United Center	20,239	1–4–0	L2
6	September 29	Columbus	4–1		Ward	United Center	20,594	2–4–0	W1

=== Regular season ===
The regular season schedule was released on June 21, 2018.

2018–19 game log

October: 6–4–3 (Home: 3–2–2; Road: 3–2–1)
#	Date	Opponent	Score	OT	Decision	Arena	Attendance	Record	Pts	Recap
1	October 4	@ Ottawa	4–3	OT	Ward	Canadian Tire Centre	15,858	1–0–0	2	W1
2	October 6	@ St. Louis	5–4	OT	Ward	Enterprise Center	17,429	2–0–0	4	W2
3	October 7	Toronto	6–7	OT	Ward	United Center	21,812	2–0–1	5	O1
4	October 11	@ Minnesota	3–4	OT	Ward	Xcel Energy Center	18,652	2–0–2	6	O2
5	October 13	St. Louis	4–3	OT	Ward	United Center	21,634	3–0–2	8	W1
6	October 18	Arizona	1–4		Crawford	United Center	21,210	3–1–2	8	L1
7	October 20	@ Columbus	4–1		Crawford	Nationwide Arena	17,005	4–1–2	10	W1
8	October 21	Tampa Bay	3–6		Ward	United Center	21,012	4–2–2	10	L1
9	October 23	Anaheim	3–1		Crawford	United Center	20,900	5–2–2	12	W1
10	October 25	NY Rangers	4–1		Crawford	United Center	21,280	6–2–2	14	W2
11	October 27	@ St. Louis	3–7		Crawford	Enterprise Center	17,201	6–3–2	14	L1
12	October 28	Edmonton	1–2	OT	Ward	United Center	20,987	6–3–3	15	O1
13	October 31	@ Vancouver	2–4		Crawford	Rogers Arena	16,955	6–4–3	15	L1

November: 3–8–2 (Home: 2–2–1; Road: 1–6–1)
#	Date	Opponent	Score	OT	Decision	Arena	Attendance	Record	Pts	Recap
14	November 1	@ Edmonton	0–4		Ward	Rogers Place	18,347	6–5–3	15	L2
15	November 3	@ Calgary	3–5		Crawford	Scotiabank Saddledome	18,143	6–6–3	15	L3
16	November 8	Carolina	3–4		Crawford	United Center	21,331	6–7–3	15	L4
17	November 10	@ Philadelphia	0–4		Crawford	Wells Fargo Center	19,355	6–8–3	15	L5
18	November 12	@ Carolina	2–3	OT	Ward	PNC Arena	11,221	6–8–4	16	O1
19	November 14	St. Louis	1–0		Crawford	United Center	21,401	7–8–4	18	W1
20	November 16	Los Angeles	1–2	SO	Crawford	United Center	21,227	7–8–5	19	O1
21	November 18	Minnesota	3–1		Crawford	United Center	21,373	8–8–5	21	W1
22	November 21	@ Washington	2–4		Crawford	Capital One Arena	18,506	8–9–5	21	L1
23	November 23	@ Tampa Bay	2–4		Crawford	Amalie Arena	19,092	8–10–5	21	L2
24	November 24	@ Florida	5–4	OT	Ward	BB&T Center	14,283	9–10–5	23	W1
25	November 27	Vegas	3–8		Crawford	United Center	21,460	9–11–5	23	L1
26	November 29	@ Winnipeg	5–6		Crawford	Bell MTS Place	15,321	9–12–5	23	L2

December: 6–8–1 (Home: 3–4–1; Road: 3–4–0)
#	Date	Opponent	Score	OT	Decision	Arena	Attendance	Record	Pts	Recap
27	December 1	@ Nashville	2–5		Ward	Bridgestone Arena	17,548	9–13–5	23	L3
28	December 2	Calgary	2–3		Crawford	United Center	21,074	9–14–5	23	L4
29	December 5	@ Anaheim	2–4		Crawford	Honda Center	15,696	9–15–5	23	L5
30	December 6	@ Vegas	3–4		Crawford	T-Mobile Arena	18,494	9–16–5	23	L6
31	December 9	Montreal	2–3		Crawford	United Center	21,057	9–17–5	23	L7
32	December 11	@ Winnipeg	3–6		Ward	Bell MTS Place	15,321	9–18–5	23	L8
33	December 12	Pittsburgh	6–3		Crawford	United Center	21,232	10–18–5	25	W1
34	December 14	Winnipeg	3–4	OT	Crawford	United Center	21,235	10–18–6	26	O1
35	December 16	San Jose	3–7		Ward	United Center	21,237	10–19–6	26	L1
36	December 18	Nashville	2–1		Ward	United Center	21,223	11–19–6	28	W1
37	December 20	@ Dallas	5–2		Ward	American Airlines Center	18,532	12–19–6	30	W2
38	December 21	@ Colorado	2–1		Delia	Pepsi Center	17,850	13–19–6	32	W3
39	December 23	Florida	3–6		Ward	United Center	21,789	13–20–6	32	L1
40	December 27	Minnesota	5–2		Delia	United Center	21,735	14–20–6	34	W1
41	December 29	@ Colorado	3–2	OT	Delia	Pepsi Center	18,028	15–20–6	36	W2

January: 3–4–3 (Home: 2–2–2; Road: 1–2–1)
#	Date	Opponent	Score	OT	Decision	Arena	Attendance	Record	Pts	Recap
42	January 1	Boston	2–4		Ward	Notre Dame Stadium	76,126 (outdoors)	15–21–6	36	L1
43	January 3	@ NY Islanders	2–3	OT	Delia	Nassau Coliseum	13,454	15–21–7	37	O1
44	January 6	@ Pittsburgh	5–3		Ward	PPG Paints Arena	18,623	16–21–7	39	W1
45	January 7	Calgary	3–4		Delia	United Center	21,036	16–22–7	39	L1
46	January 9	Nashville	3–4	OT	Delia	United Center	21,255	16–22–8	40	O1
47	January 12	Vegas	3–4	OT	Delia	United Center	21,760	16–22–9	41	O2
48	January 14	@ New Jersey	5–8		Ward	Prudential Center	15,204	16–23–9	41	L1
49	January 17	@ NY Rangers	3–4		Delia	Madison Square Garden	17,434	16–24–9	41	L2
50	January 20	Washington	8–5		Delia	United Center	21,316	17–24–9	43	W1
51	January 22	NY Islanders	3–2	SO	Ward	United Center	21,330	18–24–9	45	W2

February: 9–4–0 (Home: 4–3–0; Road: 5–1–0)
#	Date	Opponent	Score	OT	Decision	Arena	Attendance	Record	Pts	Recap
52	February 1	@ Buffalo	7–3		Ward	KeyBank Center	18,205	19–24–9	47	W3
53	February 2	@ Minnesota	4–3	OT	Delia	Xcel Energy Center	19,114	20–24–9	49	W4
54	February 5	@ Edmonton	6–2		Ward	Rogers Place	18,347	21–24–9	51	W5
55	February 7	Vancouver	4–3	OT	Delia	United Center	21,540	22–24–9	53	W6
56	February 10	Detroit	5–2		Ward	United Center	21,941	23–24–9	55	W7
57	February 12	@ Boston	3–6		Delia	TD Garden	17,565	23–25–9	55	L1
58	February 14	New Jersey	5–2		Ward	United Center	21,038	24–25–9	57	W1
59	February 16	Columbus	2–5		Ward	United Center	22,196	24–26–9	57	L1
60	February 18	Ottawa	8–7		Ward	United Center	21,338	25–26–9	59	W1
61	February 20	@ Detroit	5–4	OT	Ward	Little Caesars Arena	18,806	26–26–9	61	W2
62	February 22	Colorado	3–5		Delia	United Center	21,653	26–27–9	61	L1
63	February 24	Dallas	3–4		Ward	United Center	21,474	26–28–9	61	L2
64	February 27	@ Anaheim	4–3		Crawford	Honda Center	16,689	27–28–9	63	W1

March: 7–5–2 (Home: 3–1–1; Road: 4–4–1)
#	Date	Opponent	Score	OT	Decision	Arena	Attendance	Record	Pts	Recap
65	March 2	@ Los Angeles	3–6		Crawford	Staples Center	18,230	27–29–9	63	L1
66	March 3	@ San Jose	2–5		Ward	SAP Center	17,252	27–30–9	63	L2
67	March 7	Buffalo	5–4	SO	Crawford	United Center	21,500	28–30–9	65	W1
68	March 9	@ Dallas	2–1		Crawford	American Airlines Center	18,532	29–30–9	67	W2
69	March 11	Arizona	7–1		Crawford	United Center	21,574	30–30–9	69	W3
70	March 13	@ Toronto	5–4		Crawford	Scotiabank Arena	19,342	31–30–9	71	W4
71	March 16	@ Montreal	2–0		Crawford	Bell Centre	21,302	32–30–9	73	W5
72	March 18	Vancouver	2–3	OT	Crawford	United Center	21,496	32–30–10	74	O1
73	March 21	Philadelphia	1–3		Crawford	United Center	21,484	32–31–10	74	L1
74	March 23	@ Colorado	2–4		Crawford	Pepsi Center	17,099	32–32–10	74	L2
75	March 24	Colorado	2–1	OT	Crawford	United Center	21,410	33–32–10	76	W1
76	March 26	@ Arizona	0–1		Crawford	Gila River Arena	15,055	33–33–10	76	L1
77	March 28	@ San Jose	5–4		Crawford	SAP Center	17,364	34–33–10	78	W1
78	March 30	@ Los Angeles	2–3	OT	Crawford	Staples Center	18,230	34–33–11	79	O1

April: 2–1–1 (Home: 2–0–1; Road: 0–1–0)
#	Date	Opponent	Score	OT	Decision	Arena	Attendance	Record	Pts	Recap
79	April 1	Winnipeg	3–4	OT	Crawford	United Center	21,314	34–33–12	80	O2
80	April 3	St. Louis	4–3	SO	Ward	United Center	21,482	35–33–12	82	W1
81	April 5	Dallas	6–1		Ward	United Center	21,626	36–33–12	84	W2
82	April 6	@ Nashville	2–5		Ward	Bridgestone Arena	17,694	36–34–12	84	L1

Legend: Win (2 points) Loss (0 points) Overtime/shootout loss (1 point)

=== Detailed records ===
Western Conference
Opponent	Home	Away	Total	Pts	GF	GA
Central Division
Chicago Blackhawks	—	—	—	—	—	—
Colorado Avalanche	1–1–0	2–1–0	3–2–0	6	12	13
Dallas Stars	2–1–0	1–0–0	3–1–0	6	16	8
Minnesota Wild	2–0–0	1–0–1	3–0–1	7	15	10
Nashville Predators	1–0–1	0–2–0	1–2–1	3	9	15
St. Louis Blues	3–0–0	1–1–0	4–1–0	8	17	17
Winnipeg Jets	0–0–2	0–2–0	0–2–2	2	14	20
Total	9–2–3	5–6–1	14–8–4	32	84	83
Pacific Division
Anaheim Ducks	1–0–0	1–1–0	2–1–0	4	9	8
Arizona Coyotes	1–1–0	0–1–0	1–2–0	2	8	6
Calgary Flames	0–2–0	0–1–0	0–3–0	0	8	12
Edmonton Oilers	0–0–1	1–1–0	1–1–1	3	7	8
Los Angeles Kings	0–0–1	0–1–1	0–1–2	2	6	11
San Jose Sharks	0–1–0	1–1–0	1–2–0	2	10	16
Vancouver Canucks	1–0–1	0–1–0	1–1–1	3	8	10
Vegas Golden Knights	0–1–1	0–1–0	0–2–1	1	9	16
Total	3–5–4	2–8–1	5–13–5	15	61	84

Eastern Conference
Opponent	Home	Away	Total	Pts	GF	GA
Atlantic Division
Boston Bruins	0–1–0	0–1–0	0–2–0	0	5	10
Buffalo Sabres	1–0–0	1–0–0	2–0–0	4	12	7
Detroit Red Wings	1–0–0	1–0–0	2–0–0	4	10	6
Florida Panthers	0–1–0	1–0–0	1–1–0	2	8	10
Montreal Canadiens	0–1–0	1–0–0	1–1–0	2	4	3
Ottawa Senators	1–0–0	1–0–0	2–0–0	4	12	10
Tampa Bay Lightning	0–1–0	0–1–0	0–2–0	0	5	10
Toronto Maple Leafs	0–0–1	1–0–0	1–0–1	3	11	11
Total	3–4–1	6–2–0	9–6–1	19	67	67
Metropolitan Division
Carolina Hurricanes	0–1–0	0–0–1	0–1–1	1	5	7
Columbus Blue Jackets	0–1–0	1–0–0	1–1–0	2	6	6
New Jersey Devils	1–0–0	0–1–0	1–1–0	2	10	10
New York Islanders	1–0–0	0–0–1	1–0–1	3	5	5
New York Rangers	1–0–0	0–1–0	1–1–0	2	7	5
Philadelphia Flyers	0–1–0	0–1–0	0–2–0	0	1	7
Pittsburgh Penguins	1–0–0	1–0–0	2–0–0	4	11	6
Washington Capitals	1–0–0	0–1–0	1–1–0	2	10	9
Total	5–3–0	2–4–2	7–7–2	16	55	55

== Player statistics ==
As of April 6, 2019

=== Skaters ===
Regular season
Player	GP	G	A	Pts	+/−	PIM
Patrick Kane	81	44	66	110	2	22
Jonathan Toews	82	35	46	81	2	40
Alex DeBrincat	82	41	35	76	0	15
Erik Gustafsson	79	17	43	60	−6	34
Dylan Strome^{†}	58	17	34	51	2	14
Brandon Saad	80	23	24	47	−9	12
Duncan Keith	82	6	34	40	13	70
Artem Anisimov	78	15	22	37	−2	14
Dominik Kahun	82	13	24	37	10	6
Brent Seabrook	78	5	23	28	−6	41
David Kampf	63	4	15	19	−6	14
Brendan Perlini^{†}	46	12	3	15	−12	20
Connor Murphy	52	5	8	13	12	40
Marcus Kruger	74	4	8	12	−2	30
Drake Caggiula^{†}	26	5	7	12	3	12
Henri Jokiharju	38	0	12	12	−7	16
Nick Schmaltz^{‡}	23	2	9	11	−4	6
Chris Kunitz	56	5	5	10	−7	23
Gustav Forsling	43	3	6	9	−9	30
Dylan Sikura	33	0	8	8	2	0
Alexandre Fortin	24	3	3	6	−6	2
Jan Rutta^{‡}	23	2	4	6	0	12
Carl Dahlstrom	38	0	6	6	9	6
John Hayden	54	3	2	5	−12	27
Slater Koekkoek^{†}	22	1	4	5	4	10
Andreas Martinsen	24	1	3	4	−5	14
Brandon Manning^{‡}	27	1	2	3	−14	21
Luke Johnson	15	0	1	1	−8	8
Brandon Davidson	10	0	1	1	−4	15
Jacob Nilsson	2	0	0	0	−2	0
Dennis Gilbert	1	0	0	0	0	2

=== Goaltenders ===
Regular season
Player	GP	GS	TOI	W	L	OT	GA	GAA	SA	SV%	SO	G	A	PIM
Cam Ward	33	29	1,882:03	16	12	4	115	3.67	1,113	.897	0	0	1	4
Corey Crawford	39	39	2,212:51	14	18	5	108	2.93	1,176	.908	2	0	4	0
Collin Delia	16	14	831:03	6	4	3	50	3.61	545	.908	0	0	0	0

^{†}Denotes player spent time with another team before joining the Blackhawks. Stats reflect time with the Blackhawks only.
^{‡}Denotes player was traded mid-season. Stats reflect time with the Blackhawks only.
Bold/italics denotes franchise record.

== Awards and honours ==
=== Awards ===
Regular season
Player	Award	Awarded
Jonathan Toews	NHL Second Star of the Week	October 8, 2018
Patrick Kane	NHL Third Star of the Month	November 1, 2018
Corey Crawford	NHL Second Star of the Week	November 19, 2018
Patrick Kane	NHL First Star of the Week	December 31, 2018
Patrick Kane	NHL Third Star of the Week	January 21, 2019
Patrick Kane	NHL Third Star of the Month	February 1, 2019
Dylan Strome	NHL Third Star of the Week	February 11, 2019
Patrick Kane	NHL Second Star of the Month	March 1, 2019
Brendan Perlini	NHL Second Star of the Week	March 18, 2019

=== Milestones ===
Regular season
Player	Milestone	Reached
Henri Jokiharju	1st career NHL game	October 4, 2018
Luke Johnson	1st career NHL game	October 4, 2018
Dominik Kahun	1st career NHL game	October 4, 2018
Henri Jokiharju	1st career NHL assist 1st career NHL point	October 6, 2018
Dominik Kahun	1st career NHL assist 1st career NHL point	October 7, 2018
Dominik Kahun	1st career NHL goal	October 11, 2018
Duncan Keith	1,000th career NHL game	October 13, 2018
Jonathan Toews	800th career NHL game	October 23, 2018
Luke Johnson	1st career NHL assist 1st career NHL point	October 31, 2018
Jonathan Toews	300th career NHL goal	November 4, 2018
Jeremy Colliton	1st career NHL game coached	November 8, 2018
Alex DeBrincat	100th career NHL game	November 12, 2018
Jeremy Colliton	1st career head coaching win	November 14, 2018
Duncan Keith; Brent Seabrook	1,000 games as teammates	December 11, 2018
Jonathan Toews	700th career NHL point	December 12, 2018
Jonathan Toews	400th career NHL assist	December 27, 2018
Brent Seabrook	100th career NHL goal	January 14, 2019
Brandon Saad	500th career NHL game	February 1, 2019
Patrick Kane	900th career NHL point	February 1, 2019
Chris Kunitz	1,000th career NHL game	February 14, 2019
Brandon Saad	300th career NHL point	February 14, 2019
Marcus Kruger	500th career NHL game	February 20, 2019
Brendan Perlini	1st career NHL hat trick	March 11, 2019
Patrick Kane	900th career NHL game	April 1, 2019
Artem Anisimov	700th career NHL game	April 1, 2019
Cam Ward	700th career NHL game	April 5, 2019

=== Records ===
- Brent Seabrook – Blackhawks' all-time leader in regular season games played by a defenseman (1,009 games) (October 13, 2018)
- Brent Seabrook – Blackhawks' third all-time in regular season games played (1,014 games) (October 25, 2018)
- Corey Crawford – Blackhawks' third all-time in regular season games played by a goalie (416 games) (November 4, 2018)
- Duncan Keith and Brent Seabrook – first pair of defensemen to play 1,000 games together as teammates (December 11, 2018)
- Brent Seabrook – Blackhawks' second all-time in regular season games played (1,037 games) (December 12, 2018)
- Patrick Kane – Blackhawks' third all-time in regular season assists (555 assists) (January 20, 2019)
- Patrick Kane – Blackhawks' all-time record for consecutive games with an assist (20 games) (February 22, 2019)
- Patrick Kane - NHL second all-time in regular season for consecutive games with an assist (20 games) (February 22, 2019)
- Patrick Kane - Blackhawks' fourth all-time record for career points (924 points) (March 7, 2019)

== Transactions ==
The Blackhawks have been involved in the following transactions during the 2018–19 season.

=== Trades ===
Date	Details		Ref
June 23, 2018	To Arizona Coyotes TOR 3rd-round pick in 2018; CBJ 5th-round pick in 2018	To Chicago Blackhawks CGY 3rd-round pick in 2018	
June 23, 2018	To Montreal Canadiens 5th-round pick in 2018	To Chicago Blackhawks 5th-round pick in 2019	
June 24, 2018	To Vancouver Canucks Tanner Kero	To Chicago Blackhawks Michael Chaput	
June 27, 2018	To Columbus Blue Jackets Jean-Francois Berube	To Chicago Blackhawks Jordan Schroeder	
July 12, 2018	To Arizona Coyotes Vinnie Hinostroza; Marian Hossa; Jordan Oesterle; 3rd-round pick in 2019	To Chicago Blackhawks Andrew Campbell; MacKenzie Entwistle; Marcus Kruger; Jordan Maletta; 5th-round pick in 2019	
November 25, 2018	To Arizona Coyotes Nick Schmaltz	To Chicago Blackhawks Dylan Strome; Brendan Perlini	
December 30, 2018	To Edmonton Oilers Brandon Manning; Robin Norell	To Chicago Blackhawks Drake Caggiula; Jason Garrison	
January 11, 2019	To Tampa Bay Lightning Jan Rutta; 7th-round pick in 2019	To Chicago Blackhawks Slater Koekkoek; 5th-round pick in 2019	
January 24, 2019	To Los Angeles Kings ARI 5th-round pick in 2019	To Chicago Blackhawks Dominik Kubalik	
February 18, 2019	To New York Rangers Darren Raddysh	To Chicago Blackhawks Peter Holland	
February 24, 2019	To Los Angeles Kings Matt Iacopelli	To Chicago Blackhawks Spencer Watson	
June 15, 2019	To Pittsburgh Penguins Dominik Kahun; 5th-round pick in 2019	To Chicago Blackhawks Olli Maatta	

=== Free agents ===
Date	Player	Team	Contract term	Ref
July 1, 2018	Michael Chaput	to Montreal Canadiens	2-year	
July 1, 2018	Adam Clendening	to Columbus Blue Jackets	1-year	
July 1, 2018	Chris Kunitz	from Tampa Bay Lightning	1-year	
July 1, 2018	Brandon Manning	from Philadelphia Flyers	2-year	
July 1, 2018	Cam Ward	from Carolina Hurricanes	1-year	
July 5, 2018	Anthony Duclair	to Columbus Blue Jackets	1-year	
August 15, 2018	Lance Bouma	to Geneve-Servette HC (NL)	1-year	
September 5, 2018	Cody Franson	to Avangard Omsk (KHL)	2-year	
September 27, 2018	Brandon Davidson	from New York Islanders	1-year	
October 30, 2018	Brandon Hagel	from Buffalo Sabres	3-year	
January 3, 2019	Tomas Jurco	to Springfield Thunderbirds (AHL)	1-year	
March 6, 2019	Reese Johnson	from Red Deer Rebels (WHL)	3-year	
May 9, 2019	Victor Ejdsell	to Farjestad BK (SHL)	2-year	
May 17, 2019	Jordan Schroeder	to Torpedo Nizhny Novgorod (KHL)	1-year	
May 22, 2019	Peter Holland	to Avtomobilist Yekaterinburg (KHL)	2-year	
May 23, 2019	Anton Wedin	from Timra IK (HockeyAllsvenskan)	1-year	

=== Waivers ===
Date	Player	Team	Ref

=== Contract terminations ===
Date	Player	Via	Ref
October 5, 2018	Jordan Maletta	Mutual termination	
January 3, 2019	Jason Garrison	Mutual termination	
February 11, 2019	Luc Snuggerud	Mutual termination	

=== Retirement ===
Date	Player	Ref
April 7, 2018	Patrick Sharp	

=== Signings ===
Date	Player	Contract term	Ref
July 1, 2018	Adam Boqvist	3-year	
October 16, 2018	MacKenzie Entwistle	3-year	
November 9, 2018	Nicolas Beaudin	3-year	
February 11, 2019	Collin Delia	3-year	
March 12, 2019	Philipp Kurashev	3-year	
March 25, 2019	Chad Krys	3-year	
March 27, 2019	Carl Dahlstrom	2-year	
May 6, 2019	Mikael Hakkarainen	3-year	
May 6, 2019	Tim Soderlund	3-year	
May 13, 2019	Slater Koekkoek	1-year	
May 29, 2019	Dominik Kubalik	1-year	

== Draft picks ==
Below are the Chicago Blackhawks' selections at the 2018 NHL entry draft, which was held on June 22 and 23, 2018, at the American Airlines Center in Dallas, Texas.

Round	#	Player	Pos	Nationality	College/Junior/Club team (League)
1	8	Adam Boqvist	D	Sweden	Brynas IF (SHL)
1	27^{1}	Nicolas Beaudin	D	Canada	Drummondville Voltigeurs (QMJHL)
3	69	Jake Wise	C	United States	U.S. NTDP
3	74^{2}	Niklas Nordgren	RW	Finland	HIFK (SM-liiga)
4	120^{1}	Philipp Kurashev	C	Switzerland	Quebec Remparts (QMJHL)
5	139^{3}	Mikael Hakkarainen	LW	Finland	Muskegon Lumberjacks (USHL)
6	162	Alexis Gravel	G	Canada	Halifax Mooseheads (QMJHL)
7	193	Josiah Slavin	LW	United States	Lincoln Stars (USHL)

Notes:

1. The Nashville Predators' first-round pick went to the Chicago Blackhawks as the result of a trade on February 26, 2018, that sent Ryan Hartman and a fifth-round pick in 2018 to Nashville in exchange for Victor Ejdsell, a fourth-round pick in 2018 and this pick.
2. The Calgary Flames' third-round pick went to the Chicago Blackhawks as the result of a trade on June 23, 2018, that sent the Toronto Maple Leafs' third-round pick (87th overall), and the Columbus Blue Jackets' fifth-round pick (142nd overall) to the Arizona Coyotes in exchange for this pick. Toronto's third-round pick went to Chicago as the result of a trade on February 19, 2018, that sent Michal Kempny to Washington in exchange for this pick (being conditional at the time of the trade). Columbus's fifth-round pick went to the Blackhawks as the result of a trade on June 23, 2017, that sent Artemi Panarin, Tyler Motte and the Islanders' sixth-round pick in 2017 to the Blue Jackets in exchange for Brandon Saad, Anton Forsberg and this pick.
3. The Florida Panthers' fifth-round pick went to the Chicago Blackhawks as the result of a trade on June 23, 2018, that sent a fifth-round pick in 2019 to the Montreal Canadiens in exchange for this pick.
