= 2018–19 Detroit Red Wings season =

National Hockey League team season

2018–19 Detroit Red Wings
- Division: 7th Atlantic
- Conference: 14th Eastern
- 2018–19 record: 32–40–10
- Home record: 17–19–5
- Road record: 15–21–5
- Goals for: 227
- Goals against: 277

Team information
- General manager: Ken Holland
- Coach: Jeff Blashill
- Captain: Vacant
- Alternate captains: Justin Abdelkader; Niklas Kronwall; Dylan Larkin; Frans Nielsen
- Arena: Little Caesars Arena
- Average attendance: 19,120
- Minor league affiliates: Grand Rapids Griffins (AHL); Toledo Walleye (ECHL)

Team leaders
- Goals: Dylan Larkin (32)
- Assists: Dylan Larkin (41)
- Points: Dylan Larkin (73)
- Penalty minutes: Dylan Larkin (75)
- Plus/minus: Tyler Bertuzzi (11)
- Wins: Jimmy Howard (23)
- Goals against average: Jimmy Howard (3.07)

The 2018–19 Detroit Red Wings season was the 93rd season for the National Hockey League (NHL) franchise that was established on September 25, 1926. It was also the Red Wings' second season at Little Caesars Arena. The team was eliminated from playoff contention on March 12, 2019, and missed the playoffs for the third year in a row for the first time since the 1980–81 season and the 1982–83 season.

== Off-season ==
On June 22, the Red Wings hired Dan Bylsma as an assistant coach.

== Standings ==
Atlantic Division
Pos	Team	GP	W	L	OTL	ROW	GF	GA	GD	Pts
1	p – Tampa Bay Lightning	82	62	16	4	56	325	222	+103	128
2	x – Boston Bruins	82	49	24	9	47	259	215	+44	107
3	x – Toronto Maple Leafs	82	46	28	8	46	286	251	+35	100
4	Montreal Canadiens	82	44	30	8	41	249	236	+13	96
5	Florida Panthers	82	36	32	14	33	267	280	−13	86
6	Buffalo Sabres	82	33	39	10	28	226	271	−45	76
7	Detroit Red Wings	82	32	40	10	29	227	277	−50	74
8	Ottawa Senators	82	29	47	6	29	242	302	−60	64

Source: National Hockey League
p – Clinched Presidents' Trophy; x – Clinched playoff spot

Eastern Conference Wild Card
Pos	Div	Team	GP	W	L	OTL	ROW	GF	GA	GD	Pts
1	ME	x – Carolina Hurricanes	82	46	29	7	44	245	223	+22	99
2	ME	x – Columbus Blue Jackets	82	47	31	4	45	258	232	+26	98
3	AT	Montreal Canadiens	82	44	30	8	41	249	236	+13	96
4	AT	Florida Panthers	82	36	32	14	33	267	280	−13	86
5	ME	Philadelphia Flyers	82	37	37	8	34	244	281	−37	82
6	ME	New York Rangers	82	32	36	14	26	227	272	−45	78
7	AT	Buffalo Sabres	82	33	39	10	28	226	271	−45	76
8	AT	Detroit Red Wings	82	32	40	10	29	227	277	−50	74
9	ME	New Jersey Devils	82	31	41	10	28	222	275	−53	72
10	AT	Ottawa Senators	82	29	47	6	29	242	302	−60	64

Source: National Hockey League
x – Clinched playoff spot

== Schedule and results ==
=== Preseason ===
2018 preseason game log: 7–1–0 (Home: 4–0–0; Road: 3–1–0)
#	Date	Visitor	Score	Home	OT	Decision	Attendance	Record	Recap
1	September 19	Pittsburgh	2–3	Detroit	OT	Sateri	15,107	1–0–0	Recap
2	September 20	Chicago	2–4	Detroit		Rybar	16,475	2–0–0	Recap
3	September 22	Boston	3–4	Detroit	OT	Howard	16,855	3–0–0	Recap
4	September 23	Detroit	3–2	Pittsburgh		Sateri	18,306	4–0–0	Recap
5	September 25	Detroit	8–6	Chicago		Howard	19,864	5–0–0	Recap
6	September 26	Detroit	3–2	Boston	OT	Bernier	17,565	6–0–0	Recap
7	September 28	Detroit	2–6	Toronto		Howard	18,889	6–1–0	Recap
8	September 29	Toronto	1–5	Detroit		Bernier	18,753	7–1–0	Recap

=== Regular season ===
2018–19 game log: 32–40–10 (Home: 17–19–5; Road: 15–21–5)

October: 3–7–2 (Home: 1–3–1; Road: 2–4–1)
#	Date	Visitor	Score	Home	OT	Decision	Attendance	Record	Pts	Recap
1	October 4	Columbus	3–2	Detroit	OT	Howard	19,515	0–0–1	1	Recap
2	October 7	Detroit	2–4	Los Angeles		Bernier	18,230	0–1–1	1	Recap
3	October 8	Detroit	2–3	Anaheim	SO	Howard	17,436	0–1–2	2	Recap
4	October 11	Toronto	5–3	Detroit		Howard	19,515	0–2–2	2	Recap
5	October 13	Detroit	2–8	Boston		Bernier	17,565	0–3–2	2	Recap
6	October 15	Detroit	3–7	Montreal		Howard	20,323	0–4–2	2	Recap
7	October 18	Detroit	1–3	Tampa Bay		Howard	19,092	0–5–2	2	Recap
8	October 20	Detroit	4–3	Florida	OT	Howard	14,534	1–5–2	4	Recap
9	October 22	Carolina	3–1	Detroit		Howard	19,515	1–6–2	4	Recap
10	October 26	Winnipeg	2–1	Detroit		Howard	19,515	1–7–2	4	Recap
11	October 28	Dallas	2–4	Detroit		Bernier	19,515	2–7–2	6	Recap
12	October 30	Detroit	5–3	Columbus		Howard	14,288	3–7–2	8	Recap

November: 8–4–1 (Home: 5–2–1; Road: 3–2–0)
#	Date	Visitor	Score	Home	OT	Decision	Attendance	Record	Pts	Recap
13	November 1	New Jersey	3–4	Detroit		Howard	18,273	4–7–2	10	Recap
14	November 3	Edmonton	4–3	Detroit		Bernier	19,515	4–8–2	10	Recap
15	November 6	Vancouver	2–3	Detroit	SO	Howard	18,640	5–8–2	12	Recap
16	November 9	N.Y. Rangers	2–3	Detroit	OT	Howard	19,515	6–8–2	14	Recap
17	November 10	Detroit	4–3	Carolina	SO	Bernier	13,029	7–8–2	16	Recap
18	November 13	Arizona	1–6	Detroit		Howard	18,257	8–8–2	18	Recap
19	November 15	Detroit	1–2	Ottawa		Howard	13,402	8–9–2	18	Recap
20	November 17	Detroit	3–2	New Jersey	OT	Bernier	16,514	9–9–2	20	Recap
21	November 21	Boston	2–3	Detroit	OT	Howard	19,515	10–9–2	22	Recap
22	November 23	Detroit	1–3	Washington		Bernier	18,506	10–10–2	22	Recap
23	November 24	Buffalo	3–2	Detroit	SO	Howard	19,515	10–10–3	23	Recap
24	November 26	Columbus	7–5	Detroit		Bernier	19,515	10–11–3	23	Recap
25	November 28	St. Louis	3–4	Detroit		Howard	18,165	11–11–3	25	Recap

December: 4–8–4 (Home: 1–4–2; Road: 3–4–2)
#	Date	Visitor	Score	Home	OT	Decision	Attendance	Record	Pts	Recap
26	December 1	Detroit	4–2	Boston		Howard	17,565	12–11–3	27	Recap
27	December 2	Colorado	2–0	Detroit		Bernier	18,248	12–12–3	27	Recap
28	December 4	Tampa Bay	6–5	Detroit	SO	Howard	18,477	12–12–4	28	Recap
29	December 6	Detroit	5–4	Toronto	OT	Bernier	19,392	13–12–4	30	Recap
30	December 8	N.Y. Islanders	3–2	Detroit		Bernier	19,515	13–13–4	30	Recap
31	December 10	Los Angeles	1–3	Detroit		Howard	18,322	14–13–4	32	Recap
32	December 11	Detroit	2–6	Washington		Bernier	18,506	14–14–4	32	Recap
33	December 14	Ottawa	4–2	Detroit		Howard	18,330	14–15–4	32	Recap
34	December 15	Detroit	3–4	N.Y. Islanders	SO	Bernier	13,917	14–15–5	33	Recap
35	December 18	Detroit	2–3	Philadelphia		Bernier	19,255	14–16–5	33	Recap
36	December 20	Detroit	4–1	Carolina		Bernier	13,548	15–16–5	35	Recap
37	December 22	Florida	2–1	Detroit		Howard	19,515	15–17–5	35	Recap
38	December 23	Detroit	4–5	Toronto	OT	Bernier	19,196	15–17–6	36	Recap
39	December 27	Detroit	2–5	Pittsburgh		Howard	18,639	15–18–6	36	Recap
40	December 29	Detroit	1–5	Dallas		Bernier	18,532	15–19–6	36	Recap
41	December 31	Florida	4–3	Detroit	SO	Howard	19,515	15–19–7	37	Recap

January: 4–6–0 (Home: 2–3–0; Road: 2–3–0)
#	Date	Visitor	Score	Home	OT	Decision	Attendance	Record	Pts	Recap
42	January 2	Calgary	5–3	Detroit		Howard	19,515	15–20–7	37	Recap
43	January 4	Nashville	3–4	Detroit	OT	Howard	19,515	16–20–7	39	Recap
44	January 6	Washington	3–2	Detroit		Howard	19,515	16–21–7	39	Recap
45	January 8	Montreal	3–2	Detroit		Howard	19,515	16–22–7	39	Recap
46	January 11	Detroit	2–4	Winnipeg		Bernier	15,321	16–23–7	39	Recap
47	January 12	Detroit	5–2	Minnesota		Howard	19,087	17–23–7	41	Recap
48	January 15	Anaheim	1–3	Detroit		Howard	19,515	18–23–7	43	Recap
49	January 18	Detroit	4–6	Calgary		Howard	19,289	18–24–7	43	Recap
50	January 20	Detroit	2–3	Vancouver		Bernier	18,865	18–25–7	43	Recap
51	January 22	Detroit	3–2	Edmonton		Howard	18,347	19–25–7	45	Recap

February: 4–7–2 (Home: 2–5–1; Road: 2–2–1)
#	Date	Visitor	Score	Home	OT	Decision	Attendance	Record	Pts	Recap
52	February 1	Toronto	2–3	Detroit	OT	Howard	19,515	20–25–7	47	Recap
53	February 2	Detroit	2–0	Ottawa		Bernier	15,714	21–25–7	49	Recap
54	February 7	Vegas	4–3	Detroit		Howard	18,889	21–26–7	49	Recap
55	February 9	Detroit	1–3	Buffalo		Howard	19,070	21–27–7	49	Recap
56	February 10	Detroit	2–5	Chicago		Bernier	21,941	21–28–7	49	Recap
57	February 12	Detroit	3–2	Nashville		Howard	17,260	22–28–7	51	Recap
58	February 14	Ottawa	2–3	Detroit		Howard	18,575	23–28–7	53	Recap
59	February 16	Detroit	5–6	Philadelphia	OT	Bernier	19,342	23–28–8	54	Recap
60	February 17	Philadelphia	3–1	Detroit		Howard	19,515	23–29–8	54	Recap
61	February 20	Chicago	5–4	Detroit	OT	Bernier	18,806	23–29–9	55	Recap
62	February 22	Minnesota	3–2	Detroit		Bernier	19,515	23–30–9	55	Recap
63	February 24	San Jose	5–3	Detroit		Bernier	19,515	23–31–9	55	Recap
64	February 26	Montreal	8–1	Detroit		Howard	18,845	23–32–9	55	Recap

March: 8–6–1 (Home: 4–1–0; Road: 4–5–1)
#	Date	Visitor	Score	Home	OT	Decision	Attendance	Record	Pts	Recap
65	March 2	Detroit	1–3	Arizona		Howard	15,552	23–33–9	55	Recap
66	March 5	Detroit	3–4	Colorado	OT	Bernier	18,011	23–33–10	56	Recap
67	March 7	N.Y. Rangers	2–3	Detroit	SO	Howard	18,333	24–33–10	58	Recap
68	March 9	Detroit	2–3	Tampa Bay		Bernier	19,092	24–34–10	58	Recap
69	March 10	Detroit	1–6	Florida		Howard	15,238	24–35–10	58	Recap
70	March 12	Detroit	1–3	Montreal		Bernier	21,302	24–36–10	58	Recap
71	March 14	Tampa Bay	5–4	Detroit		Howard	19,515	24–37–10	58	Recap
72	March 16	N.Y. Islanders	1–2	Detroit		Bernier	19,515	25–37–10	60	Recap
73	March 19	Detroit	3–2	N.Y. Rangers		Howard	17,183	26–37–10	62	Recap
74	March 21	Detroit	2–5	St. Louis		Bernier	18,272	26–38–10	62	Recap
75	March 23	Detroit	3–2	Vegas	OT	Howard	18,437	27–38–10	64	Recap
76	March 25	Detroit	3–2	San Jose		Bernier	17,393	28–38–10	66	Recap
77	March 28	Detroit	5–4	Buffalo	OT	Howard	16,236	29–38–10	68	Recap
78	March 29	New Jersey	0–4	Detroit		Bernier	19,515	30–38–10	70	Recap
79	March 31	Boston	3–6	Detroit		Howard	19,515	31–38–10	72	Recap

April: 1–2–0 (Home: 1–1–0; Road: 0–1–0)
#	Date	Visitor	Score	Home	OT	Decision	Attendance	Record	Pts	Recap
80	April 2	Pittsburgh	1–4	Detroit		Howard	19,515	32–38–10	74	Recap
81	April 4	Detroit	1–4	Pittsburgh		Howard	18,574	32–39–10	74	Recap
82	April 6	Buffalo	7–1	Detroit		Howard	19,515	32–40–10	74	Recap

Legend: Win (2 points) Loss (0 points) Overtime/shootout loss (1 point)

== Player statistics ==
=== Skaters ===
Regular season
Player	GP	G	A	Pts	+/−	PIM
Dylan Larkin	76	32	41	73	−6	75
Andreas Athanasiou	76	30	24	54	−9	38
Gustav Nyquist^{‡}	62	16	33	49	0	8
Anthony Mantha	67	25	23	48	−8	30
Tyler Bertuzzi	73	21	26	47	11	36
Thomas Vanek	64	16	20	36	−12	26
Frans Nielsen	72	10	25	35	−7	14
Niklas Kronwall	79	3	24	27	−5	40
Mike Green	43	5	21	26	−1	28
Luke Glendening	78	10	13	23	2	15
Filip Hronek	46	5	18	23	−10	30
Danny DeKeyser	52	5	15	20	2	39
Justin Abdelkader	71	6	13	19	−14	38
Michael Rasmussen	62	8	10	18	−8	29
Darren Helm	61	7	10	17	−11	20
Dennis Cholowski	52	7	9	16	−20	16
Nick Jensen^{‡}	60	2	13	15	1	17
Jacob de la Rose	60	3	6	9	−13	16
Christoffer Ehn	60	3	6	9	−5	6
Trevor Daley	44	2	6	8	−3	12
Taro Hirose	10	1	6	7	0	2
Martin Frk	30	1	5	6	−9	4
Jonathan Ericsson	52	3	2	5	−10	35
Madison Bowey	17	1	3	4	−4	8
Filip Zadina	9	1	2	3	−5	0
Luke Witkowski	34	0	2	2	−5	23
Matt Puempel	8	1	0	1	−2	2
Wade Megan	11	0	1	1	−4	2
Brian Lashoff	3	0	1	1	0	2
Joe Hicketts	11	0	0	0	−9	0
Ryan Kuffner	10	0	0	0	−4	0
Dylan McIlrath	7	0	0	0	2	4
Libor Sulak	6	0	0	0	−4	6
Jake Chelios	5	0	0	0	0	2
Dominic Turgeon	4	0	0	0	−3	0

=== Goaltenders ===
Regular season
Player	GP	GS	TOI	W	L	OT	GA	GAA	SA	SV%	SO	G	A	PIM
Jimmy Howard	55	52	3,053	23	22	5	156	3.07	1,709	.909	0	0	1	2
Jonathan Bernier	35	30	1,860	9	18	5	98	3.16	1,025	.904	1	0	0	0
Kaden Fulcher	1	0	28	0	0	0	2	4.44	11	.818	0	0	0	0

^{†}Denotes player spent time with another team before joining the Red Wings. Stats reflect time with the Red Wings only.
^{‡}Denotes player was traded mid-season. Stats reflect time with the Red Wings only.
Bold/italics denotes franchise record.

== Awards and honours ==
=== Awards ===
Regular season
Player	Award	Awarded
Tyler Bertuzzi	NHL Second Star of the Week	April 1, 2019

=== Milestones ===
Regular season
Player	Milestone	Reached
Dennis Cholowski	1st career NHL game 1st career NHL goal 1st career NHL point	October 4, 2018
Christoffer Ehn	1st career NHL game	October 4, 2018
Filip Hronek	1st career NHL game	October 4, 2018
Michael Rasmussen	1st career NHL game	October 4, 2018
Libor Sulak	1st career NHL game	October 4, 2018
Dennis Cholowski	1st career NHL assist	October 7, 2018
Danny DeKeyser	100th career NHL point	October 8, 2018
Michael Rasmussen	1st career NHL point 1st career NHL assist	October 8, 2018
Christoffer Ehn	1st career NHL point 1st career NHL assist	October 11, 2018
Filip Hronek	1st career NHL point 1st career NHL assist	October 11, 2018
Filip Hronek	1st career NHL goal	October 13, 2018
Michael Rasmussen	1st career NHL goal	October 30, 2018
Thomas Vanek	400th career NHL assist	November 23, 2018
Danny DeKeyser	400th career NHL game	December 2, 2018
Trevor Daley	300th career NHL point	December 15, 2018
Trevor Daley	1,000th career NHL game	December 23, 2018
Christoffer Ehn	1st career NHL goal	December 23, 2018
Andreas Athanasiou	100th career NHL point	January 2, 2019
Thomas Vanek	1,000th career NHL game	January 4, 2019
Tyler Bertuzzi	1st career NHL hat-trick	January 12, 2019
Jimmy Howard	500th career NHL game	February 14, 2019
Dylan Larkin	300th career NHL game	February 16, 2019
Dylan Larkin	200th career NHL point	February 22, 2019
Filip Zadina	1st career NHL game	February 24, 2019
Filip Zadina	1st career NHL goal 1st career NHL point	March 5, 2019
Filip Zadina	1st career NHL assist	March 9, 2019
Darren Helm	100th career NHL goal	March 14, 2019
Luke Glendening	100th career NHL point	March 14, 2019
Ryan Kuffner	1st career NHL game	March 16, 2019
Taro Hirose	1st career NHL game 1st career NHL point 1st career NHL assist	March 19, 2019
Jake Chelios	1st career NHL game	March 29, 2019
Taro Hirose	1st career NHL goal	March 31, 2019
Kaden Fulcher	1st career NHL game	April 6, 2019

=== Records ===
- On April 2, Tyler Bertuzzi recorded two goals and one assist in a 4–1 victory over the Pittsburgh Penguins. He became the first player in Red Wings franchise history to record four consecutive three-point games.

== Suspensions/fines ==
Player	Explanation	Length	Salary	Date issued
Tyler Bertuzzi	Roughing and unsportsmanlike conduct against Colorado Avalanche forward Matt Calvert during NHL game No. 410 in Detroit on Sunday, December 2, 2018, at 12:45 of the third period.	2 games	$15,053.76	December 3, 2018

== Transactions ==
The Red Wings have been involved in the following transactions during the 2018–19 season.

=== Trades ===
Date	Details		Ref
June 23, 2018	To Columbus Blue Jackets MTL's 6th-round pick in 2018	To Detroit Red Wings 5th-round pick in 2019	
June 24, 2018	To Arizona Coyotes Robbie Russo	To Detroit Red Wings Conditional 7th-round pick in 2019	
February 22, 2019	To Washington Capitals Nick Jensen; BUF's 5th-round pick in 2019	To Detroit Red Wings Madison Bowey; 2nd-round pick in 2020	
February 25, 2019	To San Jose Sharks Gustav Nyquist	To Detroit Red Wings Conditional 2nd-round pick in 2019; Conditional 3rd-round pick in 2020	

=== Free agents ===
Date	Player	Team	Contract term	Ref
July 1, 2018	Jonathan Bernier	from Colorado Avalanche	3-year	
July 1, 2018	Jake Chelios	from Carolina Hurricanes	1-year	
July 1, 2018	Wade Megan	from St. Louis Blues	1-year	
July 1, 2018	Xavier Ouellet	to Montreal Canadiens	1-year	
July 1, 2018	Harri Sateri	from Florida Panthers	1-year	
July 1, 2018	Chris Terry	from Montreal Canadiens	2-year	
July 1, 2018	Thomas Vanek	from Columbus Blue Jackets	1-year	
July 2, 2018	Jared Coreau	to Anaheim Ducks	1-year	
July 2, 2018	Matt Lorito	to New York Islanders	2-year	
July 2, 2018	Dan Renouf	to Carolina Hurricanes	1-year	
July 2, 2018	Ben Street	to Anaheim Ducks	1-year	
July 17, 2018	Tom McCollum	to Milwaukee Admirals (AHL)	1-year	
July 25, 2018	Eric Tangradi	to New Jersey Devils	1-year	
July 30, 2018	Zach Nastasiuk	to Charlotte Checkers (AHL)	1-year	
February 5, 2019	Turner Elson	from Grand Rapids Griffins (AHL)	2-year	
March 12, 2019	Taro Hirose	from Michigan State Spartans (Big Ten)	2-year	
March 12, 2019	Ryan Kuffner	from Princeton Tigers (ECAC Hockey)	2-year	
April 15, 2019	Filip Larsson	from Denver Pioneers (NCHC)	3-year	
May 23, 2019	Jake Chelios	to Kunlun Red Star (KHL)	2-year	
May 27, 2019	Harri Sateri	to Sibir Novosibirsk (KHL)	1-year	
May 28, 2019	Oliwer Kaski	from Lahti Pelicans (Liiga)	1-year	
June 4, 2019	Libor Sulak	to Severstal Cherepovets (KHL)	1-year	

=== Waivers ===
Date	Player	Team	Ref
October 17, 2018	Jacob de la Rose	from Montreal Canadiens	

=== Contract terminations ===
Date	Player	Via	Ref
June 24, 2018	Xavier Ouellet	Buyout	

=== Retirement ===
Date	Player	Ref
September 14, 2018	Henrik Zetterberg	

=== Signings ===
Date	Player	Contract term	Ref
June 25, 2018	Tyler Bertuzzi	2-year	
June 25, 2018	Martin Frk	1-year	
June 30, 2018	Mike Green	2-year	
July 5, 2018	Andreas Athanasiou	2-year	
July 7, 2018	Filip Zadina	3-year	
July 11, 2018	Anthony Mantha	2-year	
August 10, 2018	Dylan Larkin	5-year	
September 9, 2018	Matt Puempel	2-year	
March 13, 2019	Brian Lashoff	2-year	
March 18, 2019	Chase Pearson	2-year	
March 20, 2019	Jimmy Howard	1-year	
April 15, 2019	Filip Larsson	3-year	
May 1, 2019	Joe Veleno	3-year	
May 9, 2019	Dylan McIlrath	2-year	

== Draft picks ==
Below are the Detroit Red Wings' selections at the 2018 NHL entry draft, which was held on June 22 and 23, 2018, at the American Airlines Center in Dallas, Texas.

Round	#	Player	Pos	Nationality	College/Junior/Club team (League)
1	6	Filip Zadina	RW	Czech Republic	Halifax Mooseheads (QMJHL)
1	30^{1}	Joe Veleno	C	Canada	Drummondville Voltigeurs (QMJHL)
2	33^{2}	Jonatan Berggren	RW	Sweden	Skellefteå AIK J20 (SuperElit)
2	36	Jared McIsaac	D	Canada	Halifax Mooseheads (QMJHL)
3	67	Alec Regula	D	United States	London Knights (OHL)
3	81^{3}	Seth Barton	D	Canada	Trail Smoke Eaters (BCHL)
3	84^{4}	Jesper Eliasson	G	Sweden	IF Troja/Ljungby J20 (SuperElit)
4	98	Ryan O'Reilly	RW	United States	Madison Capitols (USHL)
6	160^{5}	Victor Brattstrom	G	Sweden	Timra IK (Allsvenskan)
7	191	Otto Kivenmaki	C	Finland	Assat U20 (Nuorten SM-liiga)

Notes:

1. The Vegas Golden Knights' first-round pick went to the Detroit Red Wings as the result of a trade on February 26, 2018, that sent Tomas Tatar to Vegas in exchange for the Islanders' second-round pick in 2019, a third-round pick in 2021 and this pick.
2. The Ottawa Senators' second-round pick went to the Detroit Red Wings as the result of a trade on February 28, 2017, that sent Brendan Smith to the New York Rangers in exchange for a third-round pick in 2017 and this pick.
3. The Philadelphia Flyers' third-round pick went to the Detroit Red Wings as the result of a trade on February 19, 2018, that sent Petr Mrazek to Philadelphia in exchange for a conditional third-round pick in 2019 and this pick (being conditional at the time of the trade).
4. The Pittsburgh Penguins' third-round pick went to the Detroit Red Wings as the result of a trade on October 21, 2017, that sent Riley Sheahan and a fifth-round pick in 2018 to Pittsburgh in exchange for Scott Wilson and this pick.
5. The Montreal Canadiens' sixth-round pick went to the Columbus Blue Jackets as the result of a trade on June 23, 2018, that sent a fifth-round pick in 2019 to Detroit in exchange for this pick. The Red Wings acquired this pick as the result of a trade on February 28, 2017, that sent Steve Ott to Montreal.
