= 2018–19 Pittsburgh Penguins season =

NHL team season

2018–19 Pittsburgh Penguins
- Division: 3rd Metropolitan
- Conference: 6th Eastern
- 2018–19 record: 44–26–12
- Home record: 23–14–4
- Road record: 21–12–8
- Goals for: 273
- Goals against: 241

Team information
- General manager: Jim Rutherford
- Coach: Mike Sullivan
- Captain: Sidney Crosby
- Alternate captains: Kris Letang; Evgeni Malkin
- Arena: PPG Paints Arena
- Average attendance: 18,565
- Minor league affiliates: Wilkes-Barre/Scranton Penguins (AHL); Wheeling Nailers (ECHL)

Team leaders
- Goals: Jake Guentzel (40)
- Assists: Sidney Crosby (65)
- Points: Sidney Crosby (100)
- Penalty minutes: Evgeni Malkin (89)
- Plus/minus: Brian Dumoulin (+31)
- Wins: Matt Murray (29)
- Goals against average: Matt Murray (2.69)

The 2018–19 Pittsburgh Penguins season was the 52nd season for the National Hockey League team that was established on June 5, 1967. The Penguins clinched a playoff spot on April 4, 2019, after a 4–1 win against the Detroit Red Wings.

The Penguins qualified for the 2019 Stanley Cup playoffs, where they were swept in the first round by the New York Islanders.

== Standings ==
Metropolitan Division
Pos	Team	GP	W	L	OTL	ROW	GF	GA	GD	Pts
1	y – Washington Capitals	82	48	26	8	44	278	249	+29	104
2	x – New York Islanders	82	48	27	7	43	228	196	+32	103
3	x – Pittsburgh Penguins	82	44	26	12	42	273	241	+32	100
4	x – Carolina Hurricanes	82	46	29	7	44	245	223	+22	99
5	x – Columbus Blue Jackets	82	47	31	4	45	258	232	+26	98
6	Philadelphia Flyers	82	37	37	8	34	244	281	−37	82
7	New York Rangers	82	32	36	14	26	227	272	−45	78
8	New Jersey Devils	82	31	41	10	28	222	275	−53	72

Source: National Hockey League
x – Clinched playoff spot; y – Clinched division

== Schedule and results ==
=== Preseason ===
The preseason schedule was released on June 15, 2018.

2018 preseason game log: 2–3–1 (Home: 2–1–0; Road: 0–2–1)

#	Date	Visitor	Score	Home	Location	Attendance	Record
1	September 18	Pittsburgh	2–3	Buffalo	KeyBank Center	15,602	0–1–0
2	September 19	Pittsburgh	2–3 OT	Detroit	Little Caesars Arena	15,107	0–1–1
3	September 22	Columbus	3–7	Pittsburgh	PPG Paints Arena	17,190	1–1–1
4	September 23	Detroit	3–2	Pittsburgh	PPG Paints Arena	18,306	1–2–1
5	September 26	Buffalo	1–5	Pittsburgh	PPG Paints Arena	16,516	2–2–1
6	September 28	Pittsburgh	6–7	Columbus	Nationwide Arena	13,976	2–3–1

Legend: = Win = Loss = OT/SO Loss

=== Regular season ===
The regular season schedule was published on June 21, 2018.

2018–19 game log
October: 6–2–2 (Home: 2–2–1; Road: 4–0–1), 14 points

#	Date	Visitor	Score	Home	Location	Attendance	Record	Points
1	October 4	Washington	6–7 OT	Pittsburgh	PPG Paints Arena	18,627	1–0–0	2
2	October 6	Montreal	5–1	Pittsburgh	PPG Paints Arena	18,622	1–1–0	2
3	October 11	Vegas	2–4	Pittsburgh	PPG Paints Arena	18,610	2–1–0	4
4	October 13	Pittsburgh	3–4 SO	Montreal	Bell Centre	21,302	2–1–1	5
5	October 16	Vancouver	3–2 OT	Pittsburgh	PPG Paints Arena	18,492	2–1–2	6
6	October 18	Pittsburgh	3–0	Toronto	Scotiabank Arena	19,483	3–1–2	8
7	October 23	Pittsburgh	6–5 OT	Edmonton	Rogers Place	18,347	4–1–2	10
8	October 25	Pittsburgh	9–1	Calgary	Scotiabank Saddledome	17,834	5–1–2	12
9	October 27	Pittsburgh	5–0	Vancouver	Rogers Arena	17,537	6–1–2	14
10	October 30	NY Islanders	6–3	Pittsburgh	PPG Paints Arena	18,509	6–2–2	14

November: 4–7–3 (Home: 3–3–1; Road: 1–4–2), 11 points

#	Date	Visitor	Score	Home	Location	Attendance	Record	Points
11	November 1	Pittsburgh	2–3 SO	NY Islanders	Barclays Center	10,910	6–2–3	15
12	November 3	Toronto	5–0	Pittsburgh	PPG Paints Arena	18,638	6–3–3	15
13	November 5	New Jersey	5–1	Pittsburgh	PPG Paints Arena	18,420	6–4–3	15
14	November 7	Pittsburgh	1–2	Washington	Capital One Arena	18,506	6–5–3	15
15	November 10	Arizona	0–4	Pittsburgh	PPG Paints Arena	18,596	7–5–3	17
16	November 13	Pittsburgh	2–4	New Jersey	Prudential Center	15,108	7–6–3	17
17	November 15	Tampa Bay	4–3	Pittsburgh	PPG Paints Arena	18,422	7–7–3	17
18	November 17	Pittsburgh	4–6	Ottawa	Canadian Tire Centre	17,692	7–8–3	17
19	November 19	Buffalo	5–4 OT	Pittsburgh	PPG Paints Arena	18,618	7–8–4	18
20	November 21	Dallas	1–5	Pittsburgh	PPG Paints Arena	18,340	8–8–4	20
21	November 23	Pittsburgh	1–2 OT	Boston	TD Garden	17,565	8–8–5	21
22	November 24	Columbus	2–4	Pittsburgh	PPG Paints Arena	18,602	9–8–5	23
23	November 27	Pittsburgh	4–3	Winnipeg	Bell MTS Place	15,321	10–8–5	25
24	November 28	Pittsburgh	3–6	Colorado	Pepsi Center	17,348	10–9–5	25

December: 11–3–1 (Home: 6–2–0; Road: 5–1–1), 23 points

#	Date	Visitor	Score	Home	Location	Attendance	Record	Points
25	December 1	Philadelphia	4–2	Pittsburgh	PPG Paints Arena	18,653	10–10–5	25
26	December 4	Colorado	3–6	Pittsburgh	PPG Paints Arena	18,415	11–10–5	27
27	December 6	NY Islanders	2–6	Pittsburgh	PPG Paints Arena	18,440	12–10–5	29
28	December 8	Pittsburgh	1–2 OT	Ottawa	Canadian Tire Centre	15,795	12–10–6	30
29	December 10	Pittsburgh	2–1 SO	NY Islanders	Nassau Coliseum	13,917	13–10–6	32
30	December 12	Pittsburgh	3–6	Chicago	United Center	21,232	13–11–6	32
31	December 14	Boston	3–5	Pittsburgh	PPG Paints Arena	18,549	14–11–6	34
32	December 15	Los Angeles	3–4 OT	Pittsburgh	PPG Paints Arena	18,627	15–11–6	36
33	December 17	Anaheim	4–2	Pittsburgh	PPG Paints Arena	18,575	15–12–6	36
34	December 19	Pittsburgh	2–1	Washington	Capital One Arena	18,506	16–12–6	38
35	December 20	Minnesota	1–2	Pittsburgh	PPG Paints Arena	18,435	17–12–6	40
36	December 22	Pittsburgh	3–0	Carolina	PNC Arena	16,264	18–12–6	42
37	December 27	Detroit	2–5	Pittsburgh	PPG Paints Arena	18,639	19–12–6	44
38	December 29	Pittsburgh	6–1	St. Louis	Enterprise Center	17,475	20–12–6	46
39	December 31	Pittsburgh	3–2	Minnesota	Xcel Energy Center	19,163	21–12–6	48

January: 6–5–0 (Home: 3–2–0; Road: 3–3–0), 12 points

#	Date	Visitor	Score	Home	Location	Attendance	Record	Points
40	January 2	Pittsburgh	7–2	NY Rangers	Madison Square Garden	18,006	22–12–6	50
41	January 4	Winnipeg	0–4	Pittsburgh	PPG Paints Arena	18,642	23–12–6	52
42	January 6	Chicago	5–3	Pittsburgh	PPG Paints Arena	18,623	23–13–6	52
43	January 8	Florida	1–5	Pittsburgh	PPG Paints Arena	18,526	24–13–6	54
44	January 11	Pittsburgh	7–4	Anaheim	Honda Center	17,473	25–13–6	56
45	January 12	Pittsburgh	2–5	Los Angeles	Staples Center	18,414	25–14–6	56
46	January 15	Pittsburgh	2–5	San Jose	SAP Center	17,292	25–15–6	56
47	January 18	Pittsburgh	3–2 OT	Arizona	Gila River Arena	14,757	26–15–6	58
48	January 19	Pittsburgh	3–7	Vegas	T-Mobile Arena	18,511	26–16–6	58
49	January 28	New Jersey	6–3	Pittsburgh	PPG Paints Arena	18,609	26–17–6	58
50	January 30	Tampa Bay	2–4	Pittsburgh	PPG Paints Arena	18,514	27–17–6	60

February: 6–5–2 (Home: 3–3–0; Road: 3–2–2), 14 points

#	Date	Visitor	Score	Home	Location	Attendance	Record	Points
51	February 1	Ottawa	3–5	Pittsburgh	PPG Paints Arena	18,618	28–17–6	62
52	February 2	Pittsburgh	2–3	Toronto	Scotiabank Arena	19,477	28–18–6	62
53	February 5	Carolina	4–0	Pittsburgh	PPG Paints Arena	18,435	28–19–6	62
54	February 7	Pittsburgh	2–3 OT	Florida	BB&T Center	14,712	28–19–7	63
55	February 9	Pittsburgh	4–5	Tampa Bay	Amalie Arena	19,092	28–20–7	63
56	February 11	Pittsburgh	4–1	Philadelphia	Wells Fargo Center	19,103	29–20–7	65
57	February 13	Edmonton	1–3	Pittsburgh	PPG Paints Arena	18,750	30–20–7	67
58	February 16	Calgary	5–4	Pittsburgh	PPG Paints Arena	18,667	30–21–7	67
59	February 17	NY Rangers	5–6	Pittsburgh	PPG Paints Arena	18,646	31–21–7	69
60	February 19	Pittsburgh	4–3	New Jersey	Prudential Center	15,824	32–21–7	71
61	February 21	San Jose	4–0	Pittsburgh	PPG Paints Arena	18,362	32–22–7	71
62	February 23	Pittsburgh	3–4 OT	Philadelphia	Lincoln Financial Field	69,620 (outdoors)	32–22–8	72
63	February 26	Pittsburgh	5–2	Columbus	Nationwide Arena	18,776	33–22–8	74

March: 10–3–3 (Home: 5–2–1; Road: 5–1–2), 23 points

#	Date	Visitor	Score	Home	Location	Attendance	Record	Points
64	March 1	Pittsburgh	3–4 OT	Buffalo	KeyBank Center	19,070	33–22–9	75
65	March 2	Pittsburgh	5–1	Montreal	Bell Centre	21,302	34–22–9	77
66	March 5	Florida	2–3 OT	Pittsburgh	PPG Paints Arena	18,484	35–22–9	79
67	March 7	Columbus	0–3	Pittsburgh	PPG Paints Arena	18,611	36–22–9	81
68	March 9	Pittsburgh	1–4	Columbus	Nationwide Arena	19,146	36–23–9	81
69	March 10	Boston	2–4	Pittsburgh	PPG Paints Arena	18,578	37–23–9	83
70	March 12	Washington	3–5	Pittsburgh	PPG Paints Arena	18,640	38–23–9	85
71	March 14	Pittsburgh	5–0	Buffalo	KeyBank Arena	18,680	39–23–9	87
72	March 16	St. Louis	5–1	Pittsburgh	PPG Paints Arena	18,641	39–24–9	87
73	March 17	Philadelphia	2–1 OT	Pittsburgh	PPG Paints Arena	18,636	39–24–10	88
74	March 19	Pittsburgh	2–3 SO	Carolina	PNC Arena	14,677	39–24–11	89
75	March 21	Pittsburgh	2–1 SO	Nashville	Bridgestone Arena	17,729	40–24–11	91
76	March 23	Pittsburgh	3–2	Dallas	American Airlines Center	18,532	41–24–11	93
77	March 25	Pittsburgh	5–2	NY Rangers	Madison Square Garden	17,401	42–24–11	95
78	March 29	Nashville	3–1	Pittsburgh	PPG Paints Arena	18,632	42–25–11	95
79	March 31	Carolina	1–3	Pittsburgh	PPG Paints Arena	18,616	43–25–11	97

April: 1–1–1 (Home: 1–0–1; Road: 0–1–0), 3 points

#	Date	Visitor	Score	Home	Location	Attendance	Record	Points
80	April 2	Pittsburgh	1–4	Detroit	Little Caesars Arena	19,515	43–26–11	97
81	April 4	Detroit	1–4	Pittsburgh	PPG Paints Arena	18,574	44–26–11	99
82	April 6	NY Rangers	4–3 OT	Pittsburgh	PPG Paints Arena	18,660	44–26–12	100

Legend: = Win = Loss = OT/SO Loss

=== Detailed records ===
Final

Eastern Conference
Atlantic	GP	W	L	OT	SHOTS	GF	GA	PP	PK	FO W–L
Boston Bruins	3	2	0	1	102–129	10	7	2–8	1–7	94–104
Buffalo Sabres	3	1	0	2	112–96	12	9	5–10	1–7	106–78
Detroit Red Wings	3	2	1	0	126–89	10	7	4–9	2–4	101–81
Florida Panthers	3	2	0	1	99–113	10	6	1–9	2–10	86–85
Montreal Canadiens	3	1	1	1	75–108	9	10	2–8	1–12	104–97
Ottawa Senators	3	1	1	1	108–94	10	11	1–8	3–10	94–85
Tampa Bay Lightning	3	1	2	0	85–95	11	11	2–8	5–10	95–104
Toronto Maple Leafs	3	1	2	0	99–104	5	8	2–8	1–6	85–111
Division total	24	11	7	6	806–826	77	69	19–68	16–66	765–745

Metropolitan	GP	W	L	OT	SHOTS	GF	GA	PP	PK	FO W–L
Carolina Hurricanes	4	2	1	1	121–148	8	8	0–6	1–10	123–126
Columbus Blue Jackets	4	3	1	0	123–120	13	8	1–11	1–10	98–129
New Jersey Devils	4	1	3	0	135–142	10	18	2–13	4–13	126–128
New York Islanders	4	2	1	1	121–101	12	12	3–14	1–12	123–103
New York Rangers	4	3	0	1	141–139	21	13	3–13	2–8	127–112
Philadelphia Flyers	4	1	1	2	145–152	10	11	0–6	2–13	101–128
Pittsburgh Penguins										
Washington Capitals	4	3	1	0	143–131	15	12	6–17	2–15	134–110
Division total	28	15	8	5	929–933	89	82	15–80	13–81	832–836
Conference total	52	26	15	11	1736–1759	166	151	34–148	29–147	1597–1581

Western Conference
Central	GP	W	L	OT	SHOTS	GF	GA	PP	PK	FO W–L
Chicago Blackhawks	2	0	2	0	77–60	6	11	0–5	2–5	58–54
Colorado Avalanche	2	1	1	0	57–71	9	9	2–7	1–4	62–57
Dallas Stars	2	2	0	0	60–50	8	3	2–4	0–5	48–54
Minnesota Wild	2	2	0	0	69–74	5	3	1–4	1–3	63–54
Nashville Predators	2	1	1	0	76–55	3	4	0–6	1–5	66–50
St. Louis Blues	2	1	1	0	71–57	7	6	4–8	1–4	61–56
Winnipeg Jets	2	2	0	0	63–60	8	3	1–4	0–3	54–64
Division total	14	9	5	0	473–427	46	39	10–38	6–29	422–389

Pacific	GP	W	L	OT	SHOTS	GF	GA	PP	PK	FO W–L
Anaheim Ducks	2	1	1	0	66–61	9	8	2–7	1–4	42–56
Arizona Coyotes	2	2	0	0	67–72	7	2	2–6	1–8	73–57
Calgary Flames	2	1	1	0	74–70	13	6	5–6	1–6	61–61
Edmonton Oilers	2	2	0	0	65–85	9	6	1–4	2–7	60–64
Los Angeles Kings	2	1	1	0	76–66	6	8	2–7	2–6	49–57
San Jose Sharks	2	0	2	0	50–62	2	9	0–4	3–8	54–51
Vancouver Canucks	2	1	0	1	63–55	7	3	0–5	0–3	67–50
Vegas Golden Knights	2	1	1	0	59–72	7	9	0–3	1–4	67–60
Division total	16	9	6	1	520–543	60	51	12–42	11–46	473–456
Conference total	30	18	11	1	993–970	106	90	22–80	17–75	885–845
NHL total	82	44	26	12	2828–2729	272	241	56–228	46–222	2482–2426

== Playoffs ==
The Penguins faced the New York Islanders in the First Round of the playoffs, where they were swept in four games.

=== Game log ===
2019 Stanley Cup playoffs
Eastern Conference First Round vs. (M2) New York Islanders: Islanders won 4–0

#	Date	Visitor	Score	Home	OT	Decision	Attendance	Series	Recap
1	April 10	Pittsburgh	3–4	NY Islanders	OT	Murray	13,917	0–1	Recap
2	April 12	Pittsburgh	1–3	NY Islanders		Murray	13,917	0–2	Recap
3	April 14	NY Islanders	4–1	Pittsburgh		Murray	18,610	0–3	Recap
4	April 16	NY Islanders	3–1	Pittsburgh		Murray	18,609	0–4	Recap

Legend: = Win = Loss = Playoff series win

== Player statistics ==
Skaters

Regular season
Player	GP	G	A	Pts	+/−	PIM
Sidney Crosby	79	35	65	100	18	36
Phil Kessel	82	27	55	82	-19	28
Jake Guentzel	82	40	36	76	13	26
Evgeni Malkin	68	21	51	72	-25	89
Kris Letang	65	16	40	56	13	48
Patric Hornqvist	69	18	19	37	-3	26
Bryan Rust	72	18	17	35	10	24
Dominik Simon	71	8	20	28	8	18
Brian Dumoulin	76	3	20	23	31	20
Matt Cullen	71	7	13	20	6	14
Marcus Pettersson^{†}	57	2	17	19	13	49
Jared McCann^{†}	32	11	6	17	8	13
Zach Aston-Reese	43	8	9	17	12	26
Derick Brassard^{‡}	40	9	6	15	-6	29
Justin Schultz	29	2	13	15	0	4
Nick Bjugstad^{†}	32	9	5	14	4	14
Tanner Pearson^{†‡}	44	9	5	14	-6	13
Olli Maatta	60	1	13	14	9	12
Jack Johnson	82	1	12	13	-4	41
Jamie Oleksiak^{‡}	36	4	7	11	5	37
Teddy Blueger	28	6	4	10	7	15
Riley Sheahan^{‡}	49	7	2	9	-7	13
Garrett Wilson	50	2	6	8	2	18
Derek Grant^{‡}	25	2	3	5	3	6
Juuso Riikola	37	2	3	5	3	10
Daniel Sprong^{‡}	16	0	4	4	-7	0
Carl Hagelin^{‡}	16	1	2	3	2	12
Chad Ruhwedel	18	1	1	2	-9	4
Erik Gudbranson^{†}	19	0	2	2	7	4
Adam Johnson	6	0	2	2	2	0
Jean-Sebastien Dea^{†}	3	1	0	1	1	2
Zach Trotman	13	0	1	1	4	4
Joseph Blandisi^{†}	6	0	0	0	0	0
Total		271	459	730	—	655

Playoffs
Player	GP	G	A	Pts	+/−	PIM
Evgeni Malkin	4	1	2	3	-1	6
Justin Schultz	4	1	2	3	-2	0
Phil Kessel	4	1	1	2	-1	2
Garrett Wilson	4	1	0	1	-1	0
Erik Gudbranson	4	1	0	1	0	2
Jake Guentzel	4	1	0	1	-3	0
Sidney Crosby	4	0	1	1	-4	2
Kris Letang	4	0	1	1	-3	2
Brian Dumoulin	4	0	1	1	-3	0
Jared McCann	3	0	1	1	1	0
Marcus Pettersson	4	0	1	1	-1	4
Dominik Simon	4	0	1	1	-1	0
Matt Cullen	4	0	0	0	-1	0
Jack Johnson	3	0	0	0	-3	6
Patric Hornqvist	4	0	0	0	-2	8
Nick Bjugstad	4	0	0	0	-3	2
Bryan Rust	4	0	0	0	-4	2
Olli Maatta	1	0	0	0	-2	0
Teddy Blueger	1	0	0	0	0	0
Zach Aston-Reese	4	0	0	0	-2	0
Total		6	11	17	—	36

Goaltenders

Regular season
Player	GP	GS	TOI	W	L	OT	GA	GAA	SA	SV%	SO	G	A	PIM
Matt Murray	50	50	2880:14	29	14	6	129	2.69	1594	0.919	4	0	0	4
Casey DeSmith	36	30	1943:33	15	11	5	89	2.75	1060	0.916	3	0	0	2
Tristan Jarry	2	2	120:03	0	1	1	7	3.5	62	0.887	0	0	0	0
Total		82	4943:50	44	26	12	225	2.73	2716	0.917	7	0	0	6

Playoffs
Player	GP	GS	TOI	W	L	OT	GA	GAA	SA	SV%	SO	G	A	PIM
Matt Murray	4	4	238:44	0	4	0	12	3.02	127	0.906	0	0	0	0
Total		4	238:44	0	4	0	12	3.03	127	0.906	0	0	0	0

^{†}Denotes player spent time with another team before joining the Penguins. Stats reflect time with the Penguins only.
^{‡}Denotes player was traded mid-season. Stats reflect time with the Penguins only.

== Awards and honours ==
- Kris Letang set the franchise record for career points by a defenseman with 493. He broke the previous record of 440 held by Paul Coffey on October 6 against the Montreal Canadiens.
- Kris Letang set the franchise record for career goals by a defenseman with 112. He broke the previous record of 108 held by Paul Coffey on February 11 against the Philadelphia Flyers.

=== Milestones ===
Regular season
Player	Milestone	Reached
J. Riikola	1st career NHL game	October 11, 2018
K. Letang	100th career NHL goal	October 18, 2018
J. Johnson	800th career NHL game	November 3, 2018
C. Hagelin	500th career NHL game	November 3, 2018
J. Oleksiak	200th career NHL game	November 7, 2018
E. Malkin	800th career NHL game	November 13, 2018
K. Letang	700th career NHL game	November 19, 2018
B. Rust	200th career NHL game	November 19, 2018
J. Guentzel	1st career regular season hat-trick	November 24, 2018
J. Guentzel	100th career NHL point	November 27, 2018
O. Maatta	100th career NHL point	November 27, 2018
G. Wilson	1st career NHL assist 1st career NHL point	November 27, 2018
J. Riikola	1st career NHL assist 1st career NHL point	November 28, 2018
R. Sheahan	400th career NHL game	December 22, 2018
J. Riikola	1st career NHL goal	December 29, 2018
S. Crosby	900th career NHL game	December 31, 2018
B. Rust	100th career NHL point	January 8, 2019
T. Blueger	1st career NHL game	January 30, 2019
E. Malkin	600th career NHL assist	January 30, 2019
T. Blueger	1st career NHL goal 1st career NHL point	February 1, 2019
G. Wilson	1st career NHL goal	February 9, 2019
N. Bjugstad	400th career NHL game	February 11, 2019
B. Dumoulin	300th career NHL game	February 13, 2019
P. Kessel	800th career NHL point	February 16, 2019
P. Hornqvist	700th career NHL game	March 1, 2019
M. Cullen	1,500th career NHL game	March 5, 2019
S. Crosby	1,200th career NHL point	March 5, 2019
E. Malkin	1,000th career NHL point	March 12, 2019
J. Schultz	200th career NHL point	March 12, 2019
N. Bjugstad	200th career NHL point	March 14, 2019
C. DeSmith	50th career NHL game	March 16, 2019
D. Simon	100th career NHL game	March 17, 2019
M. Pettersson	100th career NHL game	March 23, 2019
J. Guentzel	200th career NHL game	March 29, 2019

== Transactions ==
The Penguins have been involved in the following transactions during the 2018–19 season.

=== Trades ===
Date	Details		Ref
June 23, 2018	To Colorado Avalanche OTT's 3rd-round pick in 2018; 5th-round pick in 2018	To Pittsburgh Penguins NSH's 2nd-round pick in 2018	
June 23, 2018	To Vegas Golden Knights 7th-round pick in 2018	To Pittsburgh Penguins 7th-round pick in 2019	
June 27, 2018	To Buffalo Sabres Matt Hunwick; Conor Sheary	To Pittsburgh Penguins Conditional 4th-round pick in 2019	
November 14, 2018	To Los Angeles Kings Carl Hagelin	To Pittsburgh Penguins Tanner Pearson	
December 3, 2018	To Anaheim Ducks Daniel Sprong	To Pittsburgh Penguins Marcus Pettersson	
December 5, 2018	To Ottawa Senators Stefan Elliott; Tobias Lindberg	To Pittsburgh Penguins Macoy Erkamps; Ben Sexton	
January 17, 2019	To Anaheim Ducks Derek Grant	To Pittsburgh Penguins Joseph Blandisi	
January 28, 2019	To Dallas Stars Jamie Oleksiak	To Pittsburgh Penguins Conditional 4th-round pick in 2019	
February 1, 2019	To Florida Panthers Derick Brassard; Riley Sheahan; 2nd-round pick in 2019; 4th-round pick in 2019; MIN's 4th-round pick in 2019	To Pittsburgh Penguins Nick Bjugstad; Jared McCann	
February 11, 2019	To Columbus Blue Jackets Conditional 7th-round pick in 2019	To Pittsburgh Penguins Blake Siebenaler	
February 25, 2019	To Florida Panthers Jean-Sebastien Dea	To Pittsburgh Penguins Chris Wideman	
February 25, 2019	To Vancouver Canucks Tanner Pearson	To Pittsburgh Penguins Erik Gudbranson	
June 15, 2019	To Chicago Blackhawks Olli Maatta	To Pittsburgh Penguins Dominik Kahun; 5th-round pick in 2019	

=== Free agents ===
Player	Acquired from	Lost to	Date	Contract term
Matt Cullen	Minnesota Wild		July 1, 2018	1-year
Stefan Elliott	HV71 (SHL)		July 1, 2018	1-year^{[a]}
Jimmy Hayes	New Jersey Devils		July 1, 2018	1-year^{[a]}
Jack Johnson	Columbus Blue Jackets		July 1, 2018	5-year
Josh Jooris		Toronto Maple Leafs	July 1, 2018	1-year^{[a]}
John Muse	Lehigh Valley Phantoms		July 1, 2018	1-year^{[a]}
Jarred Tinordi		Nashville Predators	July 1, 2018	1-year^{[a]}
Carter Rowney		Anaheim Ducks	July 2, 2018	3-year
Tom Kuhnhackl		New York Islanders	July 2, 2018	1-year
Andrey Pedan		Ak Bars Kazan (KHL)	July 4, 2018	2-year
Derek Grant	Anaheim Ducks		July 19, 2018	1-year
Vincent Dunn		Orlando Solar Bears (ECHL)	August 29, 2018	1-year
Ryan Haggerty	Wilkes-Barre/Scranton Penguins (AHL)		September 25, 2018	2-year^{[a]}
Frank Corrado		Toronto Marlies (AHL)	October 22, 2018	1-year
Joseph Cramarossa	Wilkes-Barre/Scranton Penguins (AHL)		February 20, 2019	1-year^{[a]}
Jake Lucchini	Michigan Tech Huskies (WCHA)		March 11, 2019	1-year^{[b]}
Oula Palve	HC TPS (Liiga)		April 22, 2019	1-year^{[b]}
Emil Larmi	HPK (Liiga)		June 2, 2019	2-year^{[b]}

=== Waivers ===
Player	Claimed from	Lost to	Date
Jean-Sebastien Dea		New Jersey Devils	September 28, 2018
Jean-Sebastien Dea	New Jersey Devils		November 29, 2018

=== Signings ===
Player	Date	Contract term
Kevin Czuczman	June 25, 2018	1-year^{[a]}
Dominik Simon	June 25, 2018	2-year
Daniel Sprong	June 25, 2018	2-year
Bryan Rust	June 26, 2018	4-year
Riley Sheahan	June 27, 2018	1-year
Jean-Sebastien Dea	June 28, 2018	1-year^{[a]}
Zach Trotman	July 1, 2018	1-year^{[a]}
Jamie Oleksiak	July 12, 2018	3-year
Filip Hallander	July 15, 2018	3-year^{[b]}
Teddy Blueger	July 17, 2018	1-year^{[a]}
Thomas Di Pauli	July 17, 2018	1-year^{[a]}
Ethan Prow	July 17, 2018	1-year^{[a]}
Tristan Jarry	July 26, 2018	2-year^{[a]}
Jake Guentzel	December 27, 2018	5-year
Casey DeSmith	January 11, 2019	3-year
Jan Drozg	March 5, 2019	3-year^{[b]}
Justin Almeida	March 9, 2019	3-year^{[b]}
Calen Addison	April 6, 2019	3-year^{[b]}
Joseph Cramarossa	April 27, 2019	1-year
Thomas Di Pauli	April 30, 2019	1-year^{[a]}
Niclas Almari	May 9, 2019	3-year^{[b]}
Kasper Bjorkqvist	May 15, 2019	2-year^{[b]}
Chad Ruhwedel	May 23, 2019	2-year

=== Retirement ===
Player	Date
Tom Sestito	September 6, 2018

=== Contract terminations ===
Player	Date
Frederik Tiffels	September 22, 2018

Notes

- ^{a} – Two-way contract
- ^{b} – Entry-level contract

== Draft picks ==
Below are the Pittsburgh Penguins' selections at the 2018 NHL entry draft, which was held on June 22 and 23, 2018, at the American Airlines Center in Dallas, Texas.

Round	#	Player	Pos	Nationality	College/Junior/Club team (League)
2	53	Calen Addison	D	Canada	Lethbridge Hurricanes (WHL)
2	58^{[a]}	Filip Hallander	C	Sweden	Timra IK (Allsvenskan)
5	129^{[b]}	Justin Almeida	C	Canada	Moose Jaw Warriors (WHL)
6	177	Liam Gorman	C	United States	Saint Sebastian's School (USHS)

Notes:

- ^{a} The Nashville Predators' second-round pick went to the Pittsburgh Penguins as the result of a trade on June 23, 2018, that sent Ottawa's third-round pick and a fifth-round pick both in 2018 (64th and 146th overall) to Colorado in exchange for this pick.
- ^{b} The Detroit Red Wings' fifth-round pick went to the Pittsburgh Penguins as the result of a trade on October 21, 2017, that sent Scott Wilson and a third-round pick in 2018 to Detroit in exchange for Riley Sheahan and this pick.
