= 2018–19 New York Rangers season =

National Hockey League season

2018–19 New York Rangers
- Division: 7th Metropolitan
- Conference: 12th Eastern
- 2018–19 record: 32–36–14
- Home record: 18–14–9
- Road record: 14–22–5
- Goals for: 227
- Goals against: 272

Team information
- General manager: Jeff Gorton
- Coach: David Quinn
- Captain: Vacant
- Alternate captains: Jesper Fast; Chris Kreider; Marc Staal; Mika Zibanejad; Mats Zuccarello (Oct. 4 – Feb. 23)
- Arena: Madison Square Garden
- Average attendance: 17,318
- Minor league affiliates: Hartford Wolf Pack (AHL); Maine Mariners (ECHL)

Team leaders
- Goals: Mika Zibanejad (30)
- Assists: Mika Zibanejad (44)
- Points: Mika Zibanejad (74)
- Penalty minutes: Tony DeAngelo (77)
- Plus/minus: Tony DeAngelo (+6)
- Wins: Henrik Lundqvist (18)
- Goals against average: Alexandar Georgiev (2.91)

The 2018–19 New York Rangers season was the franchise's 92nd season of play and their 93rd season overall. The Rangers were eliminated from playoff contention on March 23, 2019 for the second year in a row for the first time since the 2002–03 and 2003–04 seasons.

== Standings ==
=== Divisional standings ===
Metropolitan Division
Pos	Team	GP	W	L	OTL	ROW	GF	GA	GD	Pts
1	y – Washington Capitals	82	48	26	8	44	278	249	+29	104
2	x – New York Islanders	82	48	27	7	43	228	196	+32	103
3	x – Pittsburgh Penguins	82	44	26	12	42	273	241	+32	100
4	x – Carolina Hurricanes	82	46	29	7	44	245	223	+22	99
5	x – Columbus Blue Jackets	82	47	31	4	45	258	232	+26	98
6	Philadelphia Flyers	82	37	37	8	34	244	281	−37	82
7	New York Rangers	82	32	36	14	26	227	272	−45	78
8	New Jersey Devils	82	31	41	10	28	222	275	−53	72

Source: National Hockey League
x – Clinched playoff spot; y – Clinched division

=== Conference standings ===
Eastern Conference Wild Card
Pos	Div	Team	GP	W	L	OTL	ROW	GF	GA	GD	Pts
1	ME	x – Carolina Hurricanes	82	46	29	7	44	245	223	+22	99
2	ME	x – Columbus Blue Jackets	82	47	31	4	45	258	232	+26	98
3	AT	Montreal Canadiens	82	44	30	8	41	249	236	+13	96
4	AT	Florida Panthers	82	36	32	14	33	267	280	−13	86
5	ME	Philadelphia Flyers	82	37	37	8	34	244	281	−37	82
6	ME	New York Rangers	82	32	36	14	26	227	272	−45	78
7	AT	Buffalo Sabres	82	33	39	10	28	226	271	−45	76
8	AT	Detroit Red Wings	82	32	40	10	29	227	277	−50	74
9	ME	New Jersey Devils	82	31	41	10	28	222	275	−53	72
10	AT	Ottawa Senators	82	29	47	6	29	242	302	−60	64

Source: National Hockey League
x – Clinched playoff spot

== Schedule and results ==
=== Pre-season ===
The pre-season schedule was published on June 19, 2018.

2018 pre-season game log: 3–2–1 (Home: 1–1–1; Road: 2–1–0)

Game	Date	Opponent	Score	Record
1	September 17	@ New Jersey Devils	4–3 OT	1–0–0
2	September 19	Philadelphia Flyers	4–6	1–1–0
3	September 22	@ New York Islanders	2–5	1–2–0
4	September 24	New Jersey Devils	4–3 OT	2–2–0
5	September 26	New York Islanders	3–4 OT	2–2–1
6	September 27	@ Philadelphia Flyers	4–2	3–2–1

=== Regular season ===
The regular season schedule was released on June 21, 2018.

2018–19 game log
October: 4–7–1, 9 points (Home: 3–3–0; Road: 1–4–1)

Game	Date	Opponent	Score	OT	Decision	Location	Attendance	Record	Points	Recap
1	October 4	Nashville	2–3		Lundqvist	Madison Square Garden	17,117	0–1–0	0	Recap
2	October 6	@ Buffalo	1–3		Lundqvist	KeyBank Center	16,824	0–2–0	0	Recap
3	October 7	@ Carolina	5–8		Georgiev	PNC Arena	13,526	0–3–0	0	Recap
4	October 11	San Jose	3–2	OT	Lundqvist	Madison Square Garden	17,004	1–3–0	2	Recap
5	October 13	Edmonton	1–2		Lundqvist	Madison Square Garden	17,085	1–4–0	2	Recap
6	October 16	Colorado	3–2	SO	Lundqvist	Madison Square Garden	17,251	2–4–0	4	Recap
7	October 17	@ Washington	3–4	OT	Lundqvist	Capital One Arena	18,506	2–4–1	5	Recap
8	October 21	Calgary	1–4		Lundqvist	Madison Square Garden	17,404	2–5–1	5	Recap
9	October 23	Florida	5–2		Georgiev	Madison Square Garden	17,016	3–5–1	7	Recap
10	October 25	@ Chicago	1–4		Lundqvist	United Center	21,280	3–6–1	7	Recap
11	October 28	@ Los Angeles	3–4		Lundqvist	Staples Center	18,230	3–7–1	7	Recap
12	October 30	@ San Jose	4–3	SO	Lundqvist	SAP Center	17,562	4–7–1	9	Recap

November: 9–4–1, 19 points (Home: 7–1–0; Road: 2–3–1)

Game	Date	Opponent	Score	OT	Decision	Location	Attendance	Record	Points	Recap
13	November 1	@ Anaheim	3–2	SO	Georgiev	Honda Center	16,101	5–7–1	11	Recap
14	November 4	Buffalo	3–1		Lundqvist	Madison Square Garden	16,904	6–7–1	13	Recap
15	November 6	Montreal	5–3		Lundqvist	Madison Square Garden	17,428	7–7–1	15	Recap
16	November 9	@ Detroit	2–3	OT	Lundqvist	Little Caesars Arena	19,515	7–7–2	16	Recap
17	November 10	@ Columbus	5–4	SO	Georgiev	Nationwide Arena	18,384	8–7–2	18	Recap
18	November 12	Vancouver	2–1		Lundqvist	Madison Square Garden	17,100	9–7–2	20	Recap
19	November 15	@ NY Islanders	5–7		Georgiev	Barclays Center	13,472	9–8–2	20	Recap
20	November 17	Florida	4–2		Lundqvist	Madison Square Garden	18,006	10–8–2	22	Recap
21	November 19	Dallas	2–1		Lundqvist	Madison Square Garden	17,071	11–8–2	24	Recap
22	November 21	NY Islanders	5–0		Georgiev	Madison Square Garden	17,297	12–8–2	26	Recap
23	November 23	@ Philadelphia	0–4		Lundqvist	Wells Fargo Center	19,523	12–9–2	26	Recap
24	November 24	Washington	3–5		Georgiev	Madison Square Garden	16,884	12–10–2	26	Recap
25	November 26	Ottawa	4–2		Lundqvist	Madison Square Garden	16,709	13–10–2	28	Recap
26	November 29	@ Ottawa	0–3		Lundqvist	Canadian Tire Centre	10,921	13–11–2	28	Recap

December: 4–3–5, 13 points (Home: 1–0–5; Road: 3–3–0)

Game	Date	Opponent	Score	OT	Decision	Location	Attendance	Record	Points	Recap
27	December 1	@ Montreal	2–5		Georgiev	Bell Centre	21,302	13–12–2	28	Recap
28	December 2	Winnipeg	3–4	SO	Lundqvist	Madison Square Garden	17,464	13–12–3	29	Recap
29	December 8	@ Florida	5–4	SO	Lundqvist	BB&T Center	15,295	14–12–3	31	Recap
30	December 10	@ Tampa Bay	3–6		Lundqvist	Amalie Arena	19,092	14–13–3	31	Recap
31	December 14	Arizona	3–4	OT	Lundqvist	Madison Square Garden	17,441	14–13–4	32	Recap
32	December 16	Vegas	3–4	OT	Lundqvist	Madison Square Garden	17,660	14–13–5	33	Recap
33	December 18	Anaheim	3–1		Gerogiev	Madison Square Garden	17,590	15–13–5	35	Recap
34	December 22	@ Toronto	3–5		Georgiev	Scotiabank Arena	19,466	15–14–5	35	Recap
35	December 23	Philadelphia	2–3	SO	Lundqvist	Madison Square Garden	17,515	15–14–6	36	Recap
36	December 27	Columbus	3–4	OT	Lundqvist	Madison Square Garden	18,006	15–14–7	37	Recap
37	December 29	@ Nashville	4–3		Lundqvist	Bridgestone Arena	17,673	16–14–7	39	Recap
38	December 31	@ St. Louis	2–1		Lundqvist	Enterprise Center	16,849	17–14–7	41	Recap

January: 5–7–0, 10 points (Home: 2–3–0; Road: 3–4–0)

Game	Date	Opponent	Score	OT	Decision	Location	Attendance	Record	Points	Recap
39	January 2	Pittsburgh	2–7		Lundqvist	Madison Square Garden	18,006	17–15–7	41	Recap
40	January 4	@ Colorado	1–6		Georgiev	Pepsi Center	17,287	17–16–7	41	Recap
41	January 6	@ Arizona	0–5		Lundqvist	Gila River Arena	12,396	17–17–7	41	Recap
42	January 8	@ Vegas	2–4		Georgiev	T-Mobile Arena	18,249	17–18–7	41	Recap
43	January 10	NY Islanders	3–4		Lundqvist	Madison Square Garden	17,938	17–19–7	41	Recap
44	January 12	@ NY Islanders	2–1		Georgiev	Barclays Center	15,497	18–19–7	43	Recap
45	January 13	@ Columbus	5–7		Georgiev	Nationwide Arena	17,417	18–20–7	43	Recap
46	January 15	Carolina	6–2		Lundqvist	Madison Square Garden	17,636	19–20–7	45	Recap
47	January 17	Chicago	4–3		Lundqvist	Madison Square Garden	17,434	20–20–7	47	Recap
48	January 19	@ Boston	3–2		Lundqvist	TD Garden	17,565	21–20–7	49	Recap
49	January 29	Philadelphia	0–1		Georgiev	Madison Square Garden	17,163	21–21–7	49	Recap
50	January 31	@ New Jersey	4–3		Lundqvist	Prudential Center	16,514	22–21–7	51	Recap

February: 5–5–3, 13 points (Home: 3–3–2; Road: 2–2–1)

Game	Date	Opponent	Score	OT	Decision	Location	Attendance	Record	Points	Recap
51	February 2	Tampa Bay	2–3		Lundqvist	Madison Square Garden	17,468	22–22–7	51	Recap
52	February 4	Los Angeles	3–4	OT	Lundqvist	Madison Square Garden	16,233	22–22–8	52	Recap
53	February 6	Boston	4–3	SO	Georgiev	Madison Square Garden	16,848	23–22–8	54	Recap
54	February 8	Carolina	0–3		Lundqvist	Madison Square Garden	18,006	23–23–8	54	Recap
55	February 10	Toronto	4–1		Georgiev	Madison Square Garden	17,445	24–23–8	56	Recap
56	February 12	@ Winnipeg	3–4		Lundqvist	Bell MTS Place	15,321	24–24–8	56	Recap
57	February 15	@ Buffalo	6–2		Georgiev	KeyBank Center	19,070	25–24–8	58	Recap
58	February 17	@ Pittsburgh	5–6		Georgiev	PPG Paints Arena	18,646	25–25–8	58	Recap
59	February 19	@ Carolina	2–1		Lundqvist	PNC Arena	13,343	26–25–8	60	Recap
60	February 21	Minnesota	4–1		Lundqvist	Madison Square Garden	17,271	26–26–8	60	Recap
61	February 23	New Jersey	5–2		Georgiev	Madison Square Garden	17,371	27–26–8	62	Recap
62	February 24	@ Washington	5–6	OT	Lundqvist	Capital One Arena	18,506	27–26–9	63	Recap
63	February 27	Tampa Bay	3–4	OT	Georgiev	Madison Square Garden	17,012	27–26–10	64	Recap

March: 4–8–3, 11 points (Home: 2–3–1; Road: 2–5–2)

Game	Date	Opponent	Score	OT	Decision	Location	Attendance	Record	Points	Recap
64	March 1	Montreal	2–4		Lundqvist	Madison Square Garden	17,334	27–27–10	64	Recap
65	March 3	Washington	2–3	SO	Georgiev	Madison Square Garden	17,517	27–27–11	65	Recap
66	March 5	@ Dallas	0–1		Georgiev	American Airlines Center	17,974	27–28–11	65	Recap
67	March 7	@ Detroit	2–3	SO	Lundqvist	Little Caesars Arena	18,333	27–28–12	66	Recap
68	March 9	New Jersey	4–2		Lundqvist	Madison Square Garden	17,386	28–28–12	68	Recap
69	March 11	@ Edmonton	2–3	OT	Georgiev	Rogers Place	18,347	28–28–13	69	Recap
70	March 13	@ Vancouver	1–4		Lundqvist	Rogers Arena	18,225	28–29–13	69	Recap
71	March 15	@ Calgary	1–5		Georgiev	Scotiabank Saddledome	18,956	28–30–13	69	Recap
72	March 16	@ Minnesota	2–5		Lundqvist	Xcel Energy Center	18,844	28–31–13	69	Recap
73	March 19	Detroit	2–3		Lundqvist	Madison Square Garden	17,183	28–32–13	69	Recap
74	March 23	@ Toronto	2–1	OT	Georgiev	Scotiabank Arena	19,251	29–32–13	71	Recap
75	March 25	Pittsburgh	2–5		Georgiev	Madison Square Garden	17,401	29–33–13	71	Recap
76	March 27	@ Boston	3–6		Lundqvist	TD Garden	17,565	29–34–13	71	Recap
77	March 29	St. Louis	4–2		Georgiev	Madison Square Garden	17,567	30–34–13	73	Recap
78	March 31	@ Philadelphia	3–0		Georgiev	Wells Fargo Center	19,437	31–34–13	75	Recap

April: 1–2–1, 3 points (Home: 0–1–1; Road: 1–1–0)

Game	Date	Opponent	Score	OT	Decision	Location	Attendance	Record	Points	Recap
79	April 1	@ New Jersey	2–4		Lundqvist	Prudential Center	14,776	31–35–13	75	Recap
80	April 3	Ottawa	1–4		Lundqvist	Madison Square Garden	16,562	31–36–13	75	Recap
81	April 5	Columbus	2–3	SO	Georgiev	Madison Square Garden	17,341	31–36–14	76	Recap
82	April 6	@ Pittsburgh	4–3	OT	Georgiev	PPG Paints Arena	18,660	32–36–14	78	Recap

Win (2 Points) Loss (0 points) Overtime/shootout loss (1 point)

== Player statistics ==
As of April 6, 2019

=== Skaters ===
Regular season
Player	GP	G	A	Pts	+/−	PIM
Mika Zibanejad	82	30	44	74	–12	47
Chris Kreider	79	28	24	52	+4	57
Kevin Hayes^{‡}	51	14	28	42	+1	10
Pavel Buchnevich	64	21	17	38	–10	13
Mats Zuccarello^{‡}	46	11	26	37	–11	24
Jimmy Vesey	81	17	18	35	–6	21
Ryan Strome^{†}	63	18	15	33	–2	50
Vladislav Namestnikov	78	11	20	31	–7	44
Tony DeAngelo	61	4	26	30	+6	77
Kevin Shattenkirk	73	2	26	28	–15	20
Neal Pionk	73	6	20	26	–16	35
Brady Skjei	78	8	17	25	–4	44
Filip Chytil	75	11	12	23	–22	8
Brett Howden	66	6	17	23	–16	14
Jesper Fast	66	8	12	20	–3	26
Brendan Smith	63	4	9	13	–7	71
Marc Staal	79	3	10	13	–9	32
Boo Nieves	43	4	6	10	–4	8
Brendan Lemieux^{†}	19	3	3	6	–4	44
Fredrik Claesson	37	2	4	6	+3	9
Lias Andersson	42	2	4	6	–13	29
Adam McQuaid^{‡}	36	2	3	5	+3	33
Connor Brickley^{†}	14	1	3	4	+3	9
Vinni Lettieri	27	1	2	3	–7	14
Ryan Spooner^{‡}	16	1	1	2	–5	0
Libor Hájek	5	1	0	1	+1	6
Cody McLeod^{‡}	31	1	0	1	–10	60
Matt Beleskey	4	1	0	1	+1	5
Ryan Lindgren	5	0	0	0	–6	8
Steven Fogarty	10	0	0	0	–1	0
John Gilmour	5	0	0	0	–3	4
Tim Gettinger	4	0	0	0	0	0

=== Goaltenders ===
Regular season
Player	GP	GS	TOI	W	L	OT	GA	GAA	SA	SV%	SO	G	A	PIM
Henrik Lundqvist	52	52	3,088:53	18	23	10	158	3.07	1,699	.907	0	0	3	0
Alexandar Georgiev	33	30	1,874:10	14	13	4	91	2.91	1,057	.914	2	0	2	2

- ^{†} Denotes player spent time with another team before joining the Rangers. Stats reflect time with the Rangers only.
- ^{‡} Denotes player was traded mid-season. Stats reflect time with the Rangers only.
- Bold/italics denotes franchise record.

== Awards and honors ==
=== Milestones ===
Regular season
Player	Milestone	Reached
Brett Howden	1st career NHL game	October 4, 2018
Brett Howden	1st career NHL goal	October 6, 2018
Brett Howden	1st career NHL assist	October 7, 2018
Jesper Fast	100th career NHL point	October 7, 2018
David Quinn	1st career NHL win	October 11, 2018
Alexandar Georgiev	1st career NHL shutout	November 21, 2018
Ryan Lindgren	1st career NHL game	January 15, 2019
Ryan Strome	400th career NHL game	February 23, 2019
Libor Hájek	1st career NHL game	March 1, 2019
Libor Hájek	1st career NHL goal	March 9, 2019

=== Records ===
Regular season
Player	Record	Reached
Henrik Lundqvist	435th career NHL win (8th all-time)	November 4, 2018
Henrik Lundqvist	438th career NHL win (7th all-time)	November 17, 2018
Henrik Lundqvist	445th career NHL win (tied 6th all-time)	January 17, 2019
Henrik Lundqvist	446th career NHL win (6th all-time)	January 19, 2019

== Transactions ==
The Rangers have been involved in the following transactions during the 2018–19 season.

=== Trades ===
Date	Details		Ref
June 22, 2018	To Ottawa Senators BOS's 1st-round pick in 2018; NJD's 2nd-round pick in 2018	To New York Rangers PIT's 1st-round pick in 2018	
June 23, 2018	To Carolina Hurricanes BOS' 7th-round pick in 2019	To New York Rangers VGK's 7th-round pick in 2018	
September 11, 2018	To Boston Bruins Steven Kampfer; 4th-round pick in 2019; Conditional 7th-round pick	To New York Rangers Adam McQuaid	
November 16, 2018	To Edmonton Oilers Ryan Spooner	To New York Rangers Ryan Strome	
January 14, 2019	To Nashville Predators Cole Schneider	To New York Rangers Connor Brickley	
February 6, 2019	To Nashville Predators Cody McLeod	To New York Rangers 7th-round pick in 2020	
February 12, 2019	To Vancouver Canucks Marek Mazanec	To New York Rangers 7th-round pick in 2020	
February 18, 2019	To Chicago Blackhawks Peter Holland	To New York Rangers Darren Raddysh	
February 23, 2019	To Dallas Stars Mats Zuccarello	To New York Rangers Conditional 2nd-round pick in 2019; Conditional 3rd-round pick in 2020	
February 25, 2019	To Columbus Blue Jackets Adam McQuaid	To New York Rangers Julius Bergman; 4th-round pick in 2019; 7th-round pick in 2019	
February 25, 2019	To Winnipeg Jets Kevin Hayes	To New York Rangers Brendan Lemieux; 1st-round pick in 2019; Conditional 4th-round pick in 2022	
April 30, 2019	To Carolina Hurricanes 2nd-round pick in 2019; Conditional 3rd-round pick in 2020	To New York Rangers Adam Fox	
June 17, 2019	To Winnipeg Jets Neal Pionk; WPG's 1st-round pick in 2019	To New York Rangers Jacob Trouba	

=== Free agents ===
Date	Player	Team	Contract term	Ref
June 23, 2018	Sergei Zborovsky	to Sochi (KHL)	2-year	
July 1, 2018	Paul Carey	to Ottawa Senators	1-year	
July 1, 2018	Fredrik Claesson	from Ottawa Senators	1-year	
July 2, 2018	David Desharnais	to Lokomotiv Yaroslavl (KHL)	1-year	
July 3, 2018	John Albert	to Grizzlys Wolfsburg (DEL)	1-year	
July 3, 2018	Daniel Catenacci	to Bolzano-Bozen Foxes (EBEL)	Unknown	
July 25, 2018	Adam Tambellini	to Ottawa Senators	1-year	
August 20, 2018	Dustin Tokarski	from Philadelphia Flyers	1-year	
March 15, 2019	Jacob Elmer	from Lethbridge Hurricanes (WHL)	3-year	
March 30, 2019	Patrick Newell	from St. Cloud State Huskies (NCHC)	2-year	
May 8, 2019	Julius Bergman	Frölunda (SHL)	2-year	

=== Contract terminations ===
Date	Player	Via	Ref
November 14, 2018	Michael Lindqvist	Mutual termination	
January 5, 2019	Vince Pedrie	Mutual termination	

=== Retirement ===
Date	Player	Ref
September 20, 2018	Ondřej Pavelec	

=== Signings ===
Date	Player	Contract term	Ref
July 1, 2018	Vladislav Namestnikov	2-year	
July 12, 2018	Cody McLeod	1-year	
July 16, 2018	Chris Bigras	1-year	
July 16, 2018	Steven Fogarty	1-year	
July 16, 2018	John Gilmour	1-year	
July 16, 2018	Boo Nieves	1-year	
July 16, 2018	Rob O'Gara	1-year	
July 17, 2018	Jimmy Vesey	2-year	
July 28, 2018	Brady Skjei	6-year	
July 31, 2018	Kevin Hayes	1-year	
July 31, 2018	Ryan Spooner	2-year	
February 25, 2019	Steven Fogarty	1-year	
February 25, 2019	Boo Nieves	1-year	
March 4, 2019	Joey Keane	3-year	
March 9, 2019	Adam Húska	2-year	
May 2, 2019	Adam Fox	3-year	
May 3, 2019	Vitali Kravtsov	3-year	
May 3, 2019	Igor Shesterkin	2-year	
May 20, 2019	Yegor Rykov	2-year	
June 5, 2019	Tarmo Reunanen	2-year	

== Draft picks ==
Below are the New York Rangers' selections at the 2018 NHL entry draft, which was held on June 22 and 23, 2018, at the American Airlines Center in Dallas, Texas.

Round	#	Player	Pos	Nationality	College/junior/club team
1	9	Vitali Kravtsov	RW	Russia	Traktor Chelyabinsk (KHL)
1	22^{1}	K'Andre Miller	D	United States	U.S. NTDP (USHL)
1	28^{2}	Nils Lundkvist	D	Sweden	Luleå HF (SHL)
2	39	Olof Lindbom	G	Sweden	Djurgårdens IF J20 (J20 SuperElit)
3	70	Jakob Ragnarsson	D	Sweden	Almtuna IS (Allsvenskan)
3	88^{3}	Joey Keane	D	United States	Barrie Colts (OHL)
4	101	Nico Gross	D	Switzerland	Oshawa Generals (OHL)
5	132	Lauri Pajuniemi	RW	Finland	TPS (Liiga)
6	163	Simon Kjellberg	D	Sweden	Rögle BK J20 (J20 SuperElit)
7	216^{4}	Riley Hughes	RW	United States	St. Sebastian's School (USHS)

1. The Pittsburgh Penguins' first-round pick went to the New York Rangers as the result of a trade on June 22, 2018, that sent Boston's first-round pick and New Jersey's second-round pick (22nd and 48th overall) both in 2018 to Ottawa in exchange for this pick.
2. The Tampa Bay Lightning's first-round pick went to the New York Rangers as the result of a trade on February 26, 2018, that sent Ryan McDonagh and J. T. Miller to Tampa Bay in exchange for Vladislav Namestnikov, Libor Hájek, Brett Howden, a conditional first-round pick in 2019 and this pick.
3. The Boston Bruins' third-round pick went to the New York Rangers as the result of a trade on February 20, 2018, that sent Nick Holden to Boston in exchange for Rob O'Gara and this pick.
4. The Vegas Golden Knights' seventh-round pick went to the New York Rangers as the result of a trade on June 23, 2018, that sent Boston's seventh-round pick in 2019 to Carolina in exchange for this pick.
